= George Francis (cricketer) =

Barbadian cricketer (1897–1942)

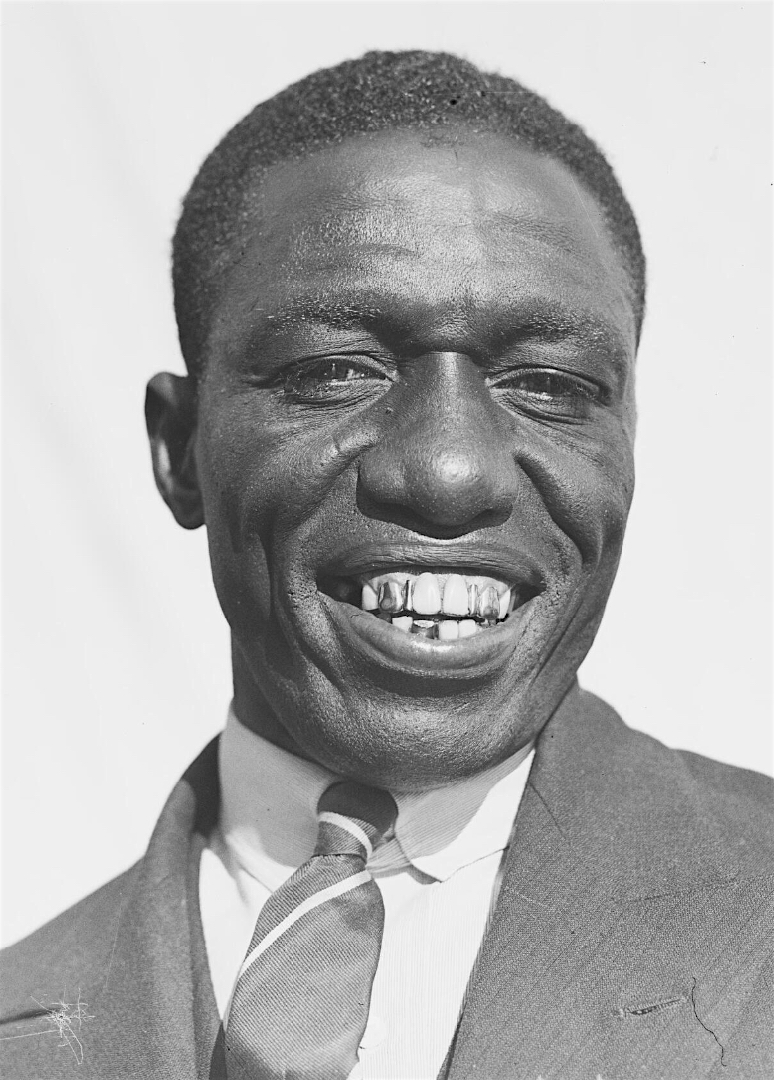

Personal information
- Full name: George Nathaniel Francis
- Born: 11 December 1897; St. James, Barbados
- Died: 12 January 1942 (aged 44); St. Michael, Barbados
- Batting: Right-handed
- Bowling: Right-arm fast

International information
- National side: West Indies
- Test debut (cap 5): 23 June 1928 v England
- Last Test: 24 June 1933 v England

Domestic team information
- Years: Team
- 1924–1930: Barbados

Career statistics
Competition	Test	First-class
Matches	10	62
Runs scored	81	874
Batting average	5.78	12.85
100s/50s	0/0	0/1
Top score	19*	61
Balls bowled	1619	10880
Wickets	23	223
Bowling average	33.17	23.13
5 wickets in innings	0	8
10 wickets in match	0	2
Best bowling	4/40	7/50
Catches/stumpings	7/–	42/–
- Source: CricketArchive, 5 February 2010

George Nathaniel Francis (11 December 1897 – 12 January 1942) was a Barbadian cricketer who played in West Indies' first Test in their inaugural Test tour of England. He was a fast bowler of renowned pace and was notably successful on West Indies' non-Test playing tour of England in 1923, but he was probably past his peak by the time the West Indies were elevated to Test status. He was born in Trents, St. James, Barbados and died at Black Rock, Saint Michael, also in Barbados.

== The 1923 tour of England ==
With limited opportunities in the inter-colonial cricket of the Caribbean and as a professional, Francis had played no first-class cricket when he was picked for 1923 West Indies tour of England. Francis' obituary in Wisden Cricketers' Almanack in 1943 states that he was a "groundsman" and that his selection for the tour came about through the "influence" of the captain, Harold Austin. The Trinidadian writer C. L. R. James, in Beyond a Boundary, wrote of how the non-selection of the Trinidad-born Herman Griffith, who played for Barbados, rankled and "an unknown, a bowler at the Austin nets, had been chosen instead". James continued: "To us it seemed that here was another flagrant piece of class discrimination. But the unknown bowler was soon to make himself known and never to be forgotten." The "unknown" was Francis.

The tour featured a mixture of first-class and other matches, and Francis' first appearance in a first-class game, the match against Sussex, was a sensation: he took four wickets for 50 in the Sussex first innings and then, when the county side was set just 99 to win the match, he took six for 33 to win the game for the West Indians by 26 runs. The Times said that Francis bowled "very fast". In his next match, Francis took five Hampshire first-innings wickets for 27, following up with two for 58 in the second innings. And in his third match, against Middlesex at Lord's, he returned figures of three for 86 and six for 34. The Times reported that "he was much too fast for most of the batsmen".

Francis did not keep up this pace of wicket-taking, but he had another impressive match at the beginning of August against Surrey, when he followed five for 31 in the first innings with five for 45 in the second, and the West Indians won the match by 10 wickets; he also took three first-innings catches off the bowling of Snuffy Browne. In its report on this match, The Times provided a detailed description of Francis' bowling:

He bowls fast and obviously scorns to conserve his strength. He is in a hurry to be at the batsman. He turns sharply to begin his run, jumps off at a great pace, throws up his arm high, and then makes a terrifying leap into the air—a leap which one feels should be accompanied by a yell. At the end of his over he snaps up the ball, if it is anywhere within reach, and passes it hurriedly to the colleague who is having at them at the other end. With it all, his length was under control, and for a time the batsmen could make nothing of him.

Unusually, Francis also contributed significantly with the bat to this victory, making 41 out of a last-wicket partnership of 136 with the opening batsman, George Challenor, whose unbeaten 155 was more than half the West Indians' total of 306.

Francis continued to take wickets through August, although he was "indisposed" for one match. The tour finished on a high note for him: during the last match at the Scarborough Festival against H. D. G. Leveson-Gower's XI, with the Leveson-Gower side requiring only 28 to win on the third morning, Francis and George John bowled for an hour and 20 minutes and took six wickets between for 19 runs before a seventh wicket partnership hit the runs off. The Times reported that "the bowling of Mr Francis and Mr John may be compared to that of those famous Australian bowlers, Mr Gregory and Mr Macdonald [sic], during their last tour in this country".

The review of the 1923 tour in Wisden Cricketers' Almanack's 1924 edition singled Francis out for praise as "an excellent fast bowler of quite an old-fashioned type". It went on: "Scorning the 'off theory' he bowled at the wicket, and in match after match he was justified by results...Though not abnormal in speed he always maintained a fine pace."

== Back in the West Indies ==
Francis played a little first-class cricket in the Inter-Colonial Tournament, but his main senior cricket between the 1923 and 1928 tours of England came in a series of five games against the 1925–26 MCC side, which played Barbados twice and a West Indies representative side three times. The first Barbados game was a dramatic success for Francis and his fast-bowling partner Herman Griffith; they each took nine wickets as the MCC side was beaten by an innings, and Francis' second-innings six for 21 was at that stage the best innings analysis of his career. The match with West Indies that followed immediately afterwards, however, proved almost the opposite, and Francis took only one wicket as Wally Hammond hit a double-century and the West Indian side collapsed twice, to be rescued from a heavy defeat by rain. A second match between MCC and Barbados followed this and fortunes were again reversed, with MCC this time salvaging a late draw after being outplayed: Francis in this match took seven MCC first-innings wickets for 50 runs and these were the best innings figures of his whole career.

Francis appeared in the other two representative matches for the West Indies, one in Trinidad and the other in British Guiana, with mixed success. In the three-match series, he took eight wickets at a high average of 37.25; in other first-class matches that season, including the two Barbados v MCC games, he took 18 wickets at an average of 8.11.

== The 1928 tour of England ==
The 1926 Imperial Cricket Conference decided that representative matches between the established Test nations – England, Australia and South Africa – and three new sides from India, the West Indies and New Zealand would henceforward be considered as Test matches, and the 1928 West Indies team was the first to make this transition. Francis, along with his Barbadian partner Griffith and Learie Constantine, who had toured England in 1923, were the three fast bowlers in the side, but the tour as a whole was a disappointment: "So far from improving upon the form of their predecessors, the team of 1928 fell so much below it that everybody was compelled to realise that the playing of Test Matches between England and West Indies was a mistake," wrote Wisden. Francis "although still fast, had not quite the pace or accuracy he possessed in 1923". With the side heavily reliant on their fast bowlers, the slip fielders and wicketkeepers "blundered time and again".

Griffith alone of the three fast bowlers made an impact in the three Test matches, taking 11 wickets; Constantine, a failure with both bat and ball in the Tests, compensated with 1381 runs and 107 wickets in all first-class matches; Francis shone neither in the Tests nor in the other games. His six Test wickets cost 42 runs each and he conceded three-and-a-half runs an over; in first-class games he took just 56 wickets at an average of 31.96. He bowled West Indies' first ball in Test cricket in the game at Lord's, and in the match at The Oval he took four wickets for 112 runs, but England needed to bat only once in each of the three Tests, and the lowest total scored off the West Indies' bowling was the 351 of the second match. In the games against the first-class counties, Francis did not take five wickets in any single innings.

In a first-class festival cricket match at the end of the season against the Harlequins, an amateur team composed of former Oxford and Cambridge University players, Francis enjoyed his best-ever match with the bat: in the first innings, he made 61 and put on 107 for the last wicket in 50 minutes with Joe Small; in the second innings, he added 73 with Griffith for the last wicket and was 32 not out when the innings ended. The 61 was Francis' highest score in first-class cricket and his only score of more than 50.

== Tests in the West Indies and Australia ==
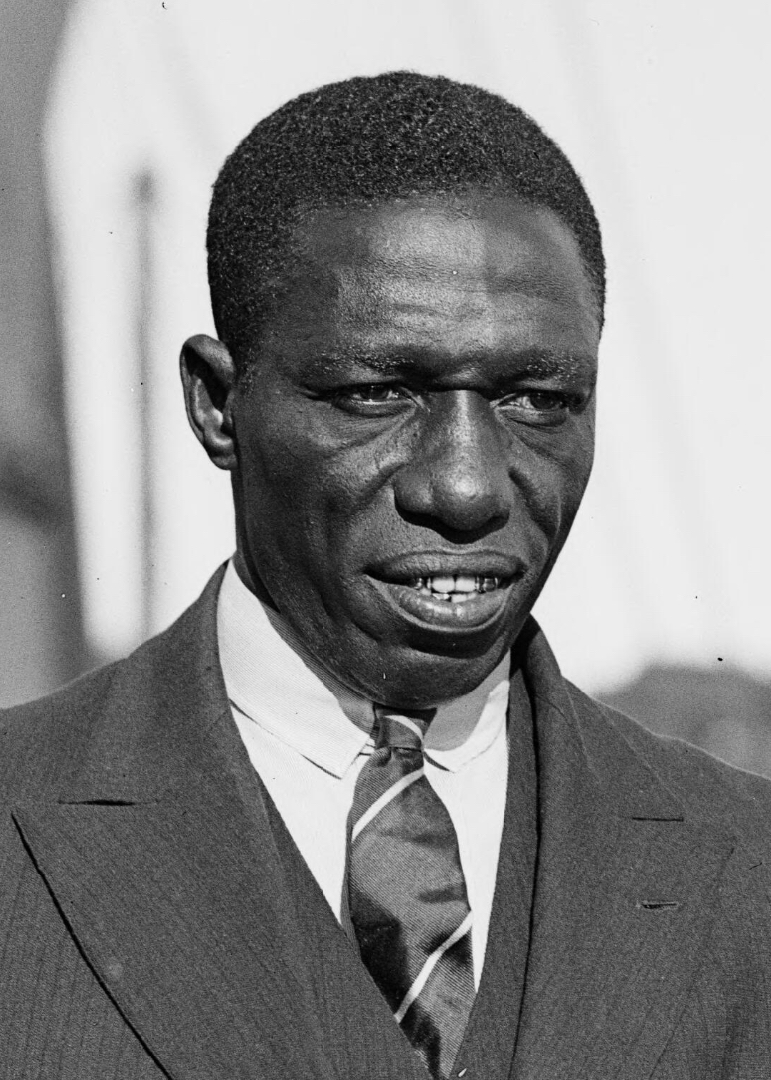
Francis in Australia during the 1930–31 tour

The next stages in the elevation of West Indies to Test status were that a team was sent to the Caribbean in 1929–30 by Marylebone Cricket Club to play a series of four Test matches and, the following season, a West Indian side travelled to Australia for the first Test series between those sides: Francis featured in matches in both seasons. The England side of 1929–30 was composed partly of Test-class players – a second tour of similar standing was organised by MCC to another of the new Test nations, New Zealand, at the same time, and some established Test players opted out of both of them. The West Indies' Test team for this series was selected match-by-match by the individual countries' cricket authorities, and Francis played in only one Test, the third match, played at Georgetown, British Guiana; this was the West Indies' first Test victory, and though the batting, led by George Headley with a century in each innings and by Clifford Roach with a double-century in the first innings, took credit in the Wisden report, Francis took six wickets in the match and, with Constantine taking nine, ensured the England side was bowled out twice. Francis' first-innings figures of four for 40 were the best innings figures he achieved in Test cricket.

The following winter, Francis, with Griffith and Constantine, formed a three-man fast bowling attack in the first-ever series between the West Indies and Australia, although, as in England in 1928, the team's success was limited. In three of the first four Test matches, the West Indies side was beaten by an innings, but in the fifth and final Test, all three fast bowlers contributed to a narrow victory; Francis took four wickets for 48 runs in Australia's first innings. In the series as a whole, he took 11 wickets at an average of 31.81.

== Final matches ==
The West Indies visited England again in 1933 and two trial matches were held in the Caribbean early in the year to select the side. Francis played in the second of these and took five wickets for 38 runs in the first innings and one for 17 in the second. These figures were not enough, however, to earn him selection and he joined Radcliffe in the Bolton Cricket League as a professional for both the 1933 and 1934 seasons, following on from one of the pioneers of black cricket in England, Charles Llewellyn. The tour organisers hoped that Constantine, who was playing Lancashire League cricket with Nelson, would be released from his contract for big matches; when Constantine was not released for the first Test match at Lord's, Francis was drafted in from Radcliffe to open the bowling with Manny Martindale. Francis failed to take a wicket in the match and, according to Wisden, "had lost something of his pace and nip off the pitch". He was not called on again, and the Test match proved to be his last game in first-class cricket.
