= George Dewhurst (cricketer) =

Trinidadian cricketer

Personal information
- Full name: George Alric R. Dewhurst
- Born: 31 October 1894; Trinidad
- Died: 4 January 1954 (aged 59); Trinidad
- Nickname: Fatty
- Batting: Right-handed
- Role: Wicket-keeper

Domestic team information
- Years: Team
- 1920–1930: Trinidad

Career statistics
Competition	First-class
Matches	31
Runs scored	665
Batting average	16.21
100s/50s	0/6
Top score	58
Catches/stumpings	47/13
- Source: CricketArchive, 18 June 2012

George Alric R. Dewhurst (31 October 1894 – 4 January 1954) was a Trinidadian cricketer who played for West Indies before the team attained Test match status. A highly regarded wicket-keeper, Dewhurst was an influential and popular member of the Trinidad and West Indian sides. In his later career, he improved substantially as a batsman. He toured England with the West Indies team in 1923 but missed the 1928 tour of England in controversial circumstances. Despite continued speculation that he would be recalled, he did not play representative cricket again.

== Early career ==
Dewhurst made his first-class debut for Trinidad in 1920, playing two matches against Barbados. The following season, he played twice in the Inter-Colonial Tournament, and also played both games in 1922. In the final of the latter tournament, he scored 58, his maiden first-class half-century and only his second score in double figures.

During 1923, a representative West Indian team toured England. Dewhurst was selected as wicket-keeper for the tour. He played in 15 games to score 182 runs at an average of 10.11, with one half-century: 52 against Nottinghamshire. Although not the team's official vice-captain, Dewhurst was very influential in the side. His performances as wicket-keeper were widely praised in the English press, and according to one team-mate from that tour, the bowling was difficult for a wicket-keeper to take. Despite competition from C. Piggott, whom many Trinidadians considered a superior wicket-keeper, Dewhurst secured his place as Trinidad's wicket-keeper after the tour. Many critics regarded Dewhurst as the best wicket-keeper in the West Indies.

Dewhurst continued to play for Trinidad between 1923 and 1926, although, owing to his business commitments, he was unable to play in every game. In 1926 he played against the Marylebone Cricket Club (MCC), which was touring the West Indies, for both Trinidad and a West Indies team. He passed fifty three times against the touring team, and such was his improvement as a batsman that critics suggested he could hold a place in the West Indies team for his batting alone. However, Dewhurst did not play another first-class match until 1930.

== Controversy and later career ==
Dewhurst occasionally captained Trinidad in the Inter-Colonial Tournament and was a candidate to captain the West Indies cricket team in England in 1928, when the two most likely men were unwilling or unable to lead the team. Dewhurst had acted as vice-captain of the West Indies team in 1926 to Harold Austin, but in the event, Karl Nunes was selected as captain. Dewhurst was also overlooked as vice-captain in favour of Vibart Wight although the latter had no captaincy experience. Dewhurst was named in the team to tour England, but he withdrew. Some newspaper reports blamed illness for his decision, others suggested business reasons. Critics believed that Dewhurst's absence adversely affected the team; the replacement wicket-keepers were not regarded as equal to Dewhurst's ability, and the vice-captain had little success. It was suggested that Dewhurst only missed the tour because he had not been chosen as vice-captain. Wisden Cricketers' Almanack noted: "The absence of Dewhurst—a member of the team of 1923—was very severely felt." However, Dewhurst was criticised in the West Indies for being unsporting by refusing to go on the tour.

After an absence from first-class cricket, Dewhurst returned to play for Trinidad in 1930 when the MCC toured the West Indies. Before the series, he was named in the press as a candidate to lead the West Indies Test team. A Barbados newspaper claimed that he was the only suitable potential captain from Trinidad. The same report suggested that, while he may not have been available for every Test, he was an ideal leader if the selectors chose different captains for the matches played on each island. During the tour, and before the Trinidad Test, the Trinidad team played the MCC. Nelson Betancourt captained in the first game and won the match; Dewhurst led in the second and was defeated. Subsequently, Betancourt was selected as captain for the Trinidad Test match. Citing "insularity and prejudice" in West Indian selection, an article in a Trinidad newspaper stated: "The selection of Betancourt in preference to Dewhurst was a pre-arranged affair, the latter being only given the leadership of the second Trinidad team in order to keep quiet a suspicious and already much chagrined public." The newspaper suggested that Dewhurst had been set up to fail when the selectors gave him a weaker team to play the MCC, that he still out-performed Betancourt in captaincy, and that the decision was based on factors other than ability.

The match between Trinidad and MCC was Dewhurst's last in first-class cricket. In 31 first-class matches, he scored 665 runs at an average of 16.21, passing fifty in six innings. He held 47 catches and made 13 stumpings. Both the Trinidad and West Indian selectors continued to leave Dewhurst out of teams. He was not chosen to tour Australia with the West Indies in 1930–31. One press report suggested "reasons are to be found in directions other than cricket", and that minds had been "poisoned". Dewhurst continued to be mentioned as a prospective selection, and even as a possibility for the West Indies captaincy, in the early 1930s, and critics still believed him to be the best wicket-keeper in the West Indies. But his lack of regular cricket was considered to count against him.

== Impact ==
Writing about cricket in Trinidad, historian C. L. R. James noted that Dewhurst always kept wicket "excellently", but that many Trinidadians considered Piggott a better wicket-keeper who was only left out because he was black and Dewhurst was white. James recalled that people were astonished when Piggott was not chosen to tour England in 1923. But he suggests it was not a surprise as without Dewhurst's selection, among the Trinidad representatives on the West Indian team, there would have been no players from the Queen's Park Club, the most prestigious club on the island, nor would there have been any white players. Writing in 1927, in the expectation that Dewhurst would tour England the following year, his 1923 team-mate C. R. Browne wrote that Dewhurst's "heart is as big as his body" and that his "expansive smile captures many victims". He described him as "very unassuming, but winning in appearance Dewhurst is effective in his job and inspires confidence in bowler and fieldsmen alike. Without Trinidad's skipper no West Indies Team is complete."
