= List of international cricketers from Barbados =

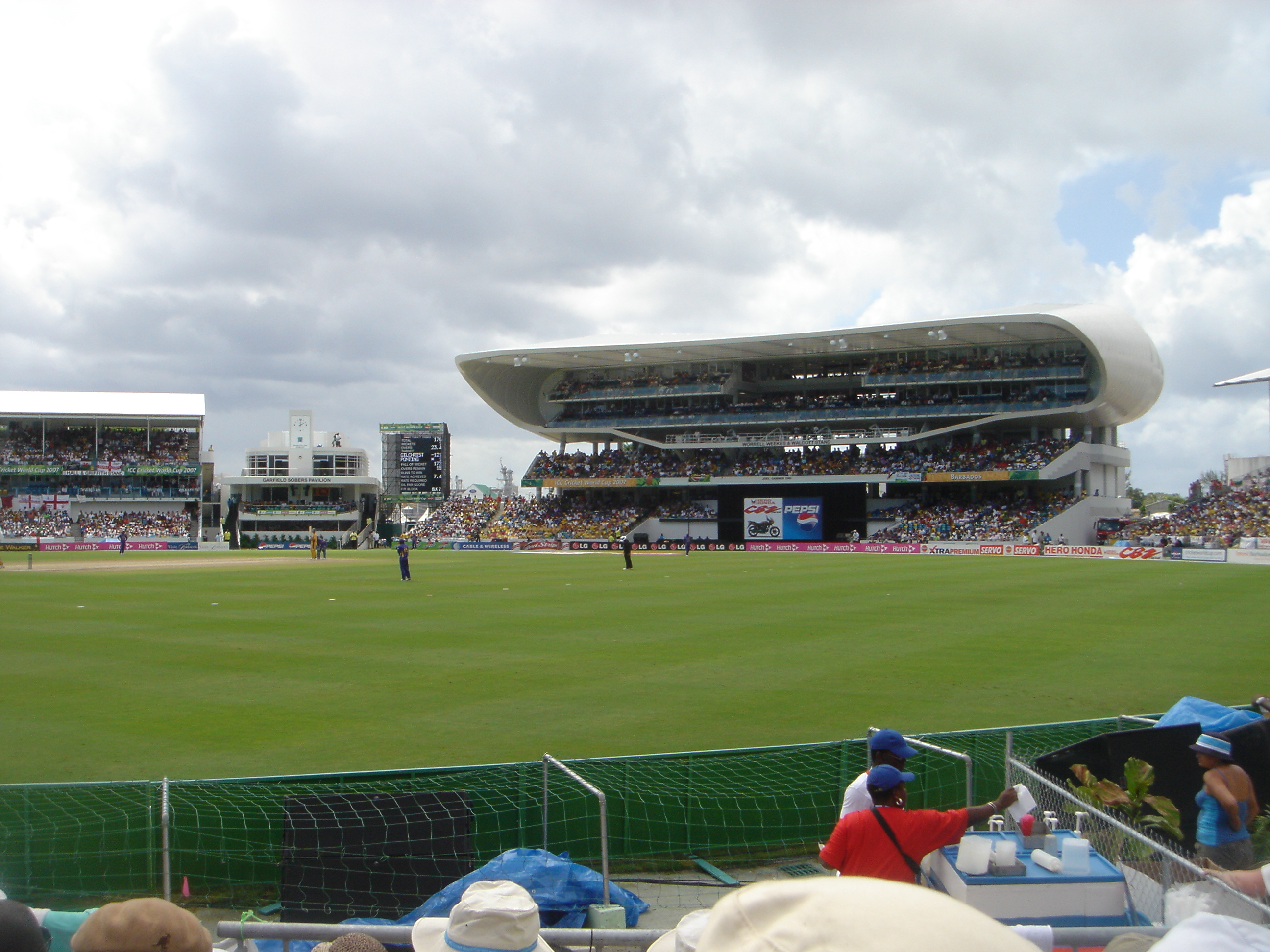
A view of the Worrell, Weekes and Walcott stand at the Kensington Oval in Barbados

The island nation of Barbados is one of the regions which makes up the West Indies cricket team. It has produced international cricketers in all forms of the game—Tests, One Day Internationals (ODIs) and Twenty20 Internationals (T20Is). Barbados contributed three players to the side that competed in the West Indies first Test match against England in 1928—Snuffy Browne, George Challenor and George Francis. The first Barbadian to captain the West Indies was Teddy Hoad during the first Test of England's tour to the West Indies in 1929. Of the nine Barbadians that have held the West Indies captaincy, Garry Sobers has led the side the most times in Tests with 39 appearances.

Sobers holds the record for the most Test runs by a Barbadian for the West Indies, his tally of 8,032 runs is the fourth highest overall for the West Indies. Desmond Haynes has scored the most ODI runs by a Barbadian for the West Indies, The only West Indian to have bettered Haynes's 8,648 ODI runs is Brian Lara. Gordon Greenidge is the second highest scoring Barbadian in both Tests and ODIs. Malcolm Marshall has taken the most Test wickets by a Barbadian with 376, which is the third highest overall for the West Indies. Marshall also holds the record for the most ODI wickets by a Barbadian with 157. Joel Garner is the second highest wicket taking Barbadian in Tests and Jason Holder has taken the second highest amount of wickets by a Barbadian in ODIs.

Other notable Barbadian international cricketers include "The Three Ws"—Everton Weekes, Frank Worrell and Clyde Walcott. They have each scored over 3,000 Test runs for the West Indies and a stand at the Kensington Oval, home of the Barbados Cricket Association, is named after them.

== Key ==
- Apps denotes the number of appearances the player has made.
- Runs denotes the number of runs scored by the player.
- Wkts denotes the number of wickets taken by the player.

West Indies captains

Statistics correct as of: October 2022

Name	International career	Apps	Runs	Wkts	Apps	Runs	Wkts	Apps	Runs	Wkts	References
Name	International career	Tests			ODIs			T20Is			References
Snuffy Browne	1928–1930	4	176	6	–	–	–	–	–	–	
George Challenor	1928	3	101	0	–	–	–	–	–	–	
George Francis	1928–1933	10	81	23	–	–	–	–	–	–	
Teddy Hoad	1928–1933	4	98	0	–	–	–	–	–	–	
Edward Bartlett	1928–1931	5	131	0	–	–	–	–	–	–	
Derek Sealy	1930–1939	11	478	3	–	–	–	–	–	–	
Leslie Walcott	1930	1	40	1	–	–	–	–	–	–	
Lionel Birkett	1930–1931	4	136	1	–	–	–	–	–	–	
Manny Martindale	1933–1939	10	58	37	–	–	–	–	–	–	
Archie Wiles	1933	1	2	0	–	–	–	–	–	–	
George Carew	1935–1949	4	170	0	–	–	–	–	–	–	
James Neblett	1935	1	16	1	–	–	–	–	–	–	
Bertie Clarke	1939	3	3	6	–	–	–	–	–	–	
Foffie Williams	1939–1948	4	113	9	–	–	–	–	–	–	
John Goddard	1948–1957	27	859	33	–	–	–	–	–	–	
Clyde Walcott	1948–1960	44	3,798	11	–	–	–	–	–	–	
Everton Weekes	1948–1958	48	4,455	1	–	–	–	–	–	–	
Frank Worrell	1948–1963	51	3,860	69	–	–	–	–	–	–	
Denis Atkinson	1948–1958	22	922	47	–	–	–	–	–	–	
Roy Marshall	1951–1952	4	143	0	–	–	–	–	–	–	
Frank King	1953–1956	14	116	29	–	–	–	–	–	–	
Ralph Legall	1953	4	50	0	–	–	–	–	–	–	
Michael Frederick	1954	1	30	0	–	–	–	–	–	–	
Garry Sobers	1954–1974	93	8,032	235	1	0	1	–	–	–	
Clairmonte Depeiaza	1955–1956	5	187	0	–	–	–	–	–	–	
Norman Marshall	1955	1	8	2	–	–	–	–	–	–	
Eric Atkinson	1958–1959	8	126	25	–	–	–	–	–	–	
Conrad Hunte	1958–1967	44	3,245	2	–	–	–	–	–	–	
Wes Hall	1958–1969	48	818	192	–	–	–	–	–	–	
Robin Bynoe	1959–1967	4	111	1	–	–	–	–	–	–	
Seymour Nurse	1960–1969	29	2,523	0	–	–	–	–	–	–	
Charlie Griffith	1960–1969	28	530	94	–	–	–	–	–	–	
Peter Lashley	1960–1966	4	159	1	–	–	–	–	–	–	
Cammie Smith	1960–1962	5	222	0	–	–	–	–	–	–	
David Allan	1962–1966	5	75	0	–	–	–	–	–	–	
Tony White	1965	2	71	3	–	–	–	–	–	–	
David Holford	1966–1977	24	768	51	–	–	–	–	–	–	
Prof Edwards	1968–1969	5	65	18	–	–	–	–	–	–	
Vanburn Holder	1969–1979	40	682	109	12	64	19	–	–	–	
John Shepherd	1969–1971	5	77	19	–	–	–	–	–	–	
Keith Boyce	1971–1976	21	657	60	8	57	13	–	–	–	
Geoff Greenidge	1972–1973	5	209	0	–	–	–	–	–	–	
Tony Howard	1972	1	0	2	–	–	–	–	–	–	
David Murray	1978–1982	19	601	0	10	45	0	–	–	–	
Gordon Greenidge	1974–1991	108	7,558	0	128	5,134	1	–	–	–	
Albert Padmore	1976	2	8	1	–	–	–	–	–	–	
Wayne Daniel	1976–1984	10	46	36	18	49	23	–	–	–	
Collis King	1976–1980	9	418	3	18	280	11	–	–	–	
Joel Garner	1977–1987	58	672	259	98	239	146	–	–	–	
Desmond Haynes	1978–1994	116	7,487	1	238	8,648	0	–	–	–	
Sylvester Clarke	1978–1982	11	172	42	10	60	13	–	–	–	
Alvin Greenidge	1978–1979	6	222	0	1	23	0	–	–	–	
Malcolm Marshall	1978–1992	81	1,810	376	136	955	157	–	–	–	
Milton Small	1984	2	3	4	2	0	1	–	–	–	
Thelston Payne	1984–1987	1	5	0	7	126	0	–	–	–	
Carlisle Best	1986–1992	8	342	0	24	473	0	–	–	–	
Ezra Moseley	1990–1991	2	35	6	9	7	7	–	–	–	
Anderson Cummins^{[a]}	1991–2007	5	98	8	76	486	91	–	–	–	
Philo Wallace	1991–2000	7	279	0	33	701	0	–	–	–	
Sherwin Campbell	1994–2002	52	2,882	0	90	2,283	8	–	–	–	
Vasbert Drakes	1995–2004	12	386	33	34	94	51	–	–	–	
Ottis Gibson	1995–1999	2	93	3	15	141	34	–	–	–	
Courtney Browne	1995–2005	20	387	0	46	415	0	–	–	–	
Patterson Thompson	1996–1997	2	17	5	2	2	2	–	–	–	
Adrian Griffith	1996–2000	14	638	0	9	99	0	–	–	–	
Floyd Reifer	1997–2009	6	111	0	8	117	0	1	22	0	
Pedro Collins	1999–2006	32	235	106	30	30	39	–	–	–	
Corey Collymore	1999–2007	30	197	93	84	104	83	–	–	–	
Hendy Bryan	1999	–	–	–	15	43	12	–	–	–	
Ryan Hinds	2001–2009	15	505	13	14	101	6	–	–	–	
Tino Best	2003–2014	25	401	57	26	76	34	6	17	6	
Ryan Hurley	2003–2004	–	–	–	9	13	5	–	–	–	
Fidel Edwards	2003–2021	55	394	165	50	73	60	26	11	20	
Dwayne Smith	2004–2015	10	320	7	105	1560	61	33	582	7	
Ian Bradshaw	2004–2007	5	96	9	62	287	78	1	0	0	
Patrick Browne	2008	–	–	–	5	134	0	–	–	–	
Sulieman Benn	2008–2016	26	486	87	47	182	39	24	37	18	
William Perkins	2008	–	–	–	–	–	–	1	9	0	
Kemar Roach	2008–	73	1101	252	95	308	10	11	3	10	
Omar Phillips	2009	2	160	0	–	–	–	–	–	–	
Dale Richards	2009–2010	3	125	0	8	179	0	1	0	0	
Ryan Austin	2009	2	39	3	–	–	–	–	–	–	
Kirk Edwards	2011–2014	17	986	0	16	331	0	–	–	–	
Ashley Nurse	2011–	–	–	–	54	502	49	13	85	8	
Kraigg Brathwaite	2011–	77	4743	25	10	278	1	–	–	–	
Carlos Brathwaite	2011–2018	3	181	1	44	559	43	41	310	31	
Jason Holder	2013–	56	2571	142	131	2042	153	46	343	46	
Miguel Cummins	2014–	14	114	27	11	10	9	–	–	–	
Shai Hope	2015–	38	1726	0	104	4308	0	19	304	0	
Jonathan Carter	2015–				33	581	4				
Shane Dowrich	2015–	35	1570	0	1	6	0	–	–	–	
Jomel Warrican	2015–	13	163	41	–	–	–	–	–	–	
Roston Chase	2016–	43	2009	79	33	553	19	6	64	6	
Kyle Hope	2017	5	101	0	7	138	0	–	–	–	
Raymon Reifer	2017–	3	87	2	5	36	5	1	19		
Shamarh Brooks	2019–	11	501	0	21	694	0	11	214		
Kyle Mayers	2021–	13	817	26	17	486	6	18	374		

== See also ==
- List of West Indies Test cricketers
- List of West Indies ODI cricketers
- List of West Indies Twenty20 International cricketers
- List of Barbadian representative cricketers

== Notes ==
- ^{a} Cummins played 13 ODIs for Canada.
