= West Indian cricket team in England in 1923 =

International cricket tour

- Part of 1923 English cricket season
- Date: 19 May 1923 – 5 September 1923
- Location: United Kingdom
- Result: No representative matches played
Teams
Captains
Most runs
Most wickets

The West Indies cricket team toured England in the 1923 season. The team played 28 matches between 19 May and 5 September 1923 of which 20 were regarded as first-class. This was the 3rd West Indian tour following those of 1900 and 1906.

The early weather was disappointing and little useful practice was possible before the tour started. 3 of the first 5 matches were lost but the remainder of the tour was much more successful and only 4 of the remaining 23 matches were lost. Because of the early poor results and the lack of representative matches public interest was rather limited.

George Challenor was by far the best batsman scoring twice as many runs as any other player at an average of over 50. He scored 6 of the 8 first class centuries scored by the team and 2 of the 3 in minor matches. George Francis led the bowling with 82 first class wickets at an average of just over 15. George John, Cyril Browne and Victor Pascall also made useful contributions with the ball. The fielding was generally regarded as of high standard with Learie Constantine's cover point fielding being particularly commented on.

The performances of the team were sufficiently well regarded by the experts of the time to pave the way for West Indies to be accepted into membership of the Imperial Cricket Conference and thereby attain Test Match status with effect from their next tour of England in 1928, in particular their reduction of a powerful H D G Leveson-Gore XI to 19-6 when requiring only 28 runs to win in the final match of the tour at Scarborough.

== Touring team ==
1923 West Indies Team

Harold Austin seems to have taken a large part in organising the tour after the 1922–23 Inter-Colonial Tournament in September 1922. He seems to have selected the Barbados, British Guiana and Trinidad tourists. Little was known of the Jamaica players and they were allocated just 3 places.

The 16 players that made up the team consisted of:

Name	
H.B.G. Austin (c)	Barbados
C.R. Browne	British Guiana
G. Challenor	Barbados
L.N. Constantine	Trinidad
G.A.R. Dewhurst	Trinidad
M.P. Fernandes	British Guiana
G.N. Francis	Barbados
J.K. Holt	Jamaica
C.V. Hunter	British Guiana
H.W. Ince	Barbados
G. John	Trinidad
R.K. Nunes (vc)	Jamaica
V.S. Pascall	Trinidad
R.L. Phillips	Jamaica
J.A. Small	Trinidad
P.H. Tarilton	Barbados

Despite being 17 years since the last tour, two of the tourists, Austin and Challenor, had been part of the 1906 team. Learie Constantine was the son of Lebrun Constantine who had toured in 1900 and 1906. Victor Pascall was the uncle of Learie Constantine.

R.H. Mallett was the manager. Austin was chosen as captain and Nunes as vice-captain.

The professionals Francis and John were black as were Browne, Constantine, Holt, Pascall and Small amongst the amateurs.

== Preliminaries ==
Except for the Jamaica representatives the team sailed on the steamship Intaba, which left British Guiana on 9 April and, sailing via Trinidad and Barbados, reached Southampton on 30 April. The Jamaican players had arrived two days earlier.

The players practised at Lord's and practice matches were arranged including a match against the Indian Gymkhana but the weather was very cold.

== Matches ==
=== Status ===
Of the 28 matches 8 were not regarded as first-class. These were the matches against Durham, Northumberland, Cheshire, Wiltshire, Lord Harris's XI, Dublin University, Northern Cricket Union, and Norfolk. These are shown in italics below.

=== Match 1 v Cambridge University ===
19, 21 May

West Indians {{{score1}}}	Vs	Cambridge University {{{score2}}}

Lost by 9 wickets
Cambridge

=== Match 2 v Sussex ===
23, 24 May

West Indians {{{score1}}}	Vs	Sussex {{{score2}}}

Won by 26 runs
Hove

=== Match 3 v M.C.C. ===
26, 28, 29 May

M.C.C. {{{score1}}}	Vs	West Indians {{{score2}}}

Drawn
Lord's

=== Match 4 v Hampshire ===
May 30,31

Hampshire {{{score1}}}	Vs	West Indians {{{score2}}}

Lost by 144 runs
Southampton

=== Match 5 v Middlesex ===
2, 4, 5 June

Middlesex {{{score1}}}	Vs	West Indians {{{score2}}}

Lost by 70 runs
Lord's

=== Match 6 v Oxford University ===
6, 7, 8 June

Oxford University {{{score1}}}	Vs	West Indians {{{score2}}}

Won by 8 wickets
Oxford

=== Match 7 v Essex ===
9, 11, 12 June

Essex {{{score1}}}	Vs	West Indians {{{score2}}}

Won by 3 wickets
Ilford

=== Match 8 v Durham ===
13, 14 June

West Indians {{{score1}}}	Vs	Durham {{{score2}}}

Won by 180 runs
Darlington

=== Match 9 v Northumberland ===
15, 16 June

West Indians {{{score1}}}	Vs	Northumberland {{{score2}}}

Won by an innings and 9 runs
Newcastle

=== Match 10 v Derbyshire ===
20, 21, 22 June

West Indians {{{score1}}}	Vs	Derbyshire {{{score2}}}

Drawn
Buxton

=== Match 11 v Northamptonshire ===
23, 25, 26 June

West Indians {{{score1}}}	Vs	Northamptonshire {{{score2}}}

Drawn
Northampton

=== Match 12 v Lancashire ===
23, 25, 26 June

Lancashire {{{score1}}}	Vs	West Indians {{{score2}}}

Drawn
Old Trafford

=== Match 13 v Cheshire ===
27, 28, 29 June

West Indians {{{score1}}}	Vs	Cheshire {{{score2}}}

Won by 140 runs
Macclesfield

=== Match 14 v Nottinghamshire ===
30, 2, 3 June July

Nottinghamshire {{{score1}}}	Vs	West Indians {{{score2}}}

Drawn
Trent Bridge

=== Match 15 v Leicestershire ===
4, 5, 6 July

West Indians {{{score1}}}	Vs	Leicestershire {{{score2}}}

Drawn
Leicester

=== Match 16 v Wiltshire ===
11, 12 July

West Indians {{{score1}}}	Vs	Wiltshire {{{score2}}}

Won by an innings and 34 runs
Swindon

=== Match 17 v Warwickshire ===
14, 16 July

Warwickshire {{{score1}}}	Vs	West Indians {{{score2}}}

Won by 9 wickets
Edgbaston

=== Match 18 v Lord Harris' XI ===
20, 21 July

Lord Harris's XI {{{score1}}}	Vs	West Indians {{{score2}}}

Won by 3 wickets
Belmont

=== Match 19 v Dublin University ===
23, 24 July

Dublin University Cricket Club {{{score1}}}	Vs	West Indians {{{score2}}}

Won by 8 wickets
Dublin

=== Match 20 v Northern Cricket Union ===
25, 26 July

West Indians {{{score1}}}	Vs	Northern Cricket Union {{{score2}}}

Drawn
Belfast

=== Match 21 v Gloucestershire ===
28, 30, 31 July

Gloucestershire {{{score1}}}	Vs	West Indians {{{score2}}}

Drawn
Bristol

=== Match 22 v Surrey ===
1, 2, 3 August

Surrey {{{score1}}}	Vs	West Indians {{{score2}}}

Won by 10 wickets
The Oval

=== Match 23 v Glamorgan ===
4, 6, 7 August

Glamorgan {{{score1}}}	Vs	West Indians {{{score2}}}

Lost by 43 runs
Cardiff

=== Match 24 v Somerset ===
8, 9, 10 August

West Indians {{{score1}}}	Vs	Somerset {{{score2}}}

Won by 190 runs
Weston-super-Mare

=== Match 25 v Kent ===
18, 19, 20 August

Kent {{{score1}}}	Vs	West Indians {{{score2}}}

Lost 171 runs
Canterbury

=== Match 26 v Norfolk ===
22, 23, 24 August

West Indians {{{score1}}}	Vs	Norfolk {{{score2}}}

Won by 231 runs
Norwich

=== Match 27 v Worcestershire ===
19, 30, 31 August

Worcestershire {{{score1}}}	Vs	West Indians {{{score2}}}

Drawn
Worcester

=== Match 28 v H.D.G Leveson-Gower's XI ===
3, 4, 5 September

West Indians {{{score1}}}	Vs	H.D.G. Leveson-Gower's XI {{{score2}}}

Lost by 4 wickets
Scarborough

=== Summary ===
Of the 20 first-class matches played, 6 matches were won, 7 were lost and 7 were drawn. In all matches 13 were won, 7 were lost and 8 were drawn.

== Post Tour ==
Except for Jamaican players the team returned on board the steam ship "Ingoma" departing Southampton on 9 September and arriving in Barbados on the 21st.

== Averages ==
The following averages are for the 20 first-class matches only.

=== Batting ===
Player	P	I	NO	R	HS	Ave	100	50	C/S
G Challenor	20	35	5	1556	155*	51.86	6	8	4
MP Fernandes	11	19	4	523	110	34.86	1	2	6
JA Small	18	27	2	776	94	31.04	–	7	20
HBG Austin	11	16	2	360	76	25.71	–	2	4
PH Tarilton	17	28	2	554	109*	21.30	1	3	2
RK Nunes	15	24	1	455	89	19.78	–	3	-
HW Ince	16	26	3	381	46*	16.56	–	–	3
LN Constantine	20	31	4	425	77	15.74	–	2	15
JK Holt	12	19	0	293	56	15.42	–	2	6
G John	10	13	4	108	44*	12.00	–	–	5
GN Francis	15	22	4	207	41	11.50	–	–	15
CR Browne	18	26	2	258	24*	10.75	–	–	14
VS Pascall	19	28	7	222	40	10.57	–	–	11
GAR Dewhurst	15	23	5	182	52	10.11	–	1	20/5
CV Hunter	2	2	0	10	9	5.00	–	–	-
RL Phillips	1	–	–	–	–	–	–	–	-

In all 28 matches G Challenor was leading run scorer with 1967. JA Small with 1169 also reached 1000 runs.

=== Bowling ===
Player	O	M	R	W	BB	Ave	5i	10m
GN Francis	505.5	119	1278	82	6/33	15.58	5	2
G John	363.2	84	956	49	7/52	19.51	2	1
LN Constantine	244.4	39	809	37	5/48	21.86	1	-
CR Browne	696	171	1672	75	7/97	22.29	4	-
VS Pascall	470.5	92	1263	52	6/77	24.28	2	-
G Challenor	17	3	54	2	2/17	27.00	–	-
JA Small	196	28	636	19	5/93	33.47	1	-
JK Holt	25	4	80	1	1/22	80.00	–	-
RL Phillips	7	0	21	0				

In all 28 matches GN Francis took 102 wickets. G John took exactly 100 wickets.

== Annual reviews ==
- Wisden Cricketers' Almanack 1924 (Part II pages 422 to 452)
