= Maurice Fernandes =

West Indian Test cricketer (1897–1981)

Personal information
- Full name: Maurius Pacheco Fernandes
- Born: 12 August 1897; Georgetown, British Guiana
- Died: 8 May 1981 (aged 83); Georgetown, Guyana
- Batting: Right-handed
- Role: Occasional wicket-keeper
- Relatives: Leslie Fernandes (son)

International information
- National side: West Indies
- Test debut (cap 4): 23 June 1928 v England
- Last Test: 21 February 1930 v England

Domestic team information
- Years: Team
- 1922–1932: British Guiana

Career statistics
Competition	Test	First-class
Matches	2	46
Runs scored	49	2,087
Batting average	12.25	28.20
100s/50s	0/0	4/9
Top score	22	141
Balls bowled	0	321
Wickets	–	5
Bowling average	–	36.60
5 wickets in innings	–	0
10 wickets in match	–	0
Best bowling	–	2/29
Catches/stumpings	0/–	30/0
- Source: CricketArchive, 31 January 2010

Maurius Pacheco Fernandes (12 August 1897 – 8 May 1981), known as Maurice Fernandes, was a West Indian Test cricketer who played first-class cricket for British Guiana between 1922 and 1932. He made two Test appearances for the West Indies, in 1928 and 1930. Fernandes played as a right-handed top-order batsman and occasional wicket-keeper. He scored 2,087 first-class runs in 46 appearances at an average of 28.20.

Graduating from playing at the Demerara Cricket Club as a teenager, to play for British Guiana in 1922, Fernandes took part in tours of England in 1923 and 1928. He made his debut Test appearance during the 1928 tour, playing in the first of the three Tests. His next, and final Test match came during the English tour of the West Indies in 1930. At the time, the West Indies had a practice of picking their captain from the colony that the match was being played in, and Fernandes was granted the honour for the match in British Guiana. The West Indies won the match, their maiden victory in Test cricket. After the match, Fernandes only played one further first-class match, and retired from first-class cricket in 1932.

== Early life and career ==
Maurius Pacheco Fernandes was born in Georgetown, British Guiana, on 12 August 1897. He played for the Demerara Cricket Club as a teenager, gaining a reputation as a good cricketer, and made his debut for British Guiana during the 1922 Inter-Colonial Tournament, facing Trinidad. Playing as an opening batsman, Fernandes scored a duck in his first innings, but made 25 runs in the second.

He was part of the West Indian team that toured England in 1923, playing twenty first-class matches against county and representative opposition. Fernandes played in over half of the matches, and passed fifty on three occasions against first-class opposition. He had reached 83 not out when his side declared against Northamptonshire, and reached 73 runs in the second innings against Lancashire in the next match, having narrowly missed out in the first innings, when he scored 49. His highest score of the tour, and his maiden first-class century came against Leicestershire, when he hit 110 runs. In A History of Cricket, H. S. Altham and E. W. Swanton describe the touring side as one which "proved themselves equal to the best." The team relied heavily on the batting of George Challenor, who struck six centuries, and it was only Challenor that Fernandes trailed in the batting averages on the tour: he scored 523 runs at an average of 34.86, and was one of only two players other than Challenor to score a century for the West Indies.

During the Inter-Colonial Tournament in October 1925, (Note: The Inter-Colonial Tournament was made up of three teams (British Guiana, Barbados and Trinidad) and each team played either one or two matches each year: a heat between two of the teams, from which the winner progressed to the final, in which they faced the champions of the previous year's tournament.) Fernandes made significant scores in each of British Guiana's matches: he scored 89 runs in the first innings of their match against Barbados, helping his side to open up a 144-run first innings lead, which they converted into an eight wicket victory. In the subsequent match against Trinidad, he reached 124, but lacked support from his teammates, three of whom fell just short of half-centuries. British Guiana eventually lost the match by two wickets. In the following February, the Marylebone Cricket Club (MCC) toured the West Indies, playing matches in Barbados, Trinidad, British Guiana and Jamaica. Three of the matches, one in each location excluding Jamaica, was against representative West Indies sides: Fernandes played in the match held in British Guiana, but not in either of the others, and also played in both matches between British Guiana and the touring MCC. In the last of these matches, he was selected as captain of the British Guiana side, and marked the occasion by scoring 120 in his team's only innings of a drawn match. He remained as captain for the colony's 1927 match against Barbados, in which their opponents scored 715/9 declared: the second highest innings score made against the team.

== Test cricket ==
Fernandes was part of the West Indian side which toured England in 1928. After the success of their 1923 tour, three of the matches were granted Test status. The team played 30 first-class matches, but in contrast to their previous tour, they won just five of them. Altham and Swanton describe the side as being "substantially less formidable combination than the West Indies of '23." The touring side lacked a regular wicket-keeper, and as a result Fernandes and the West Indian captain Karl Nunes shared the duties, though Nunes kept in all three Tests. Both were expensive on occasion: against Ireland, Fernandes allowed 25 byes in one innings, and Nunes the same number against Nottinghamshire. Fernandes' batting was significantly less effective than it had been five years before; he passed fifty on only three occasions, making 73 against both Ireland, and Cambridge University, and 54 against Middlesex. He played in the first Test match, the West Indies' first appearance in Test cricket, facing England at Lord's. Batting at number three in each innings, he scored a duck in the first, and eight runs in the second after the West Indies had been forced to follow-on. England won the match by an innings and 58 runs. Fernandes played 20 of the first-class matches in the tour, and scored 581 runs at an average of 18.15.

During the 1929 Inter-Colonial Tournament, Fernandes made the highest score of his first-class career during a seven-day match against Barbados. After the early dismissal of captain Maurice Green, Fernandes joined Jeremy McKenzie at the crease. The pair added 177 runs for the second wicket before McKenzie was run out for 74. Fernandes then shared another century partnership with Frank de Caires, before being dismissed for 141. British Guiana won the match by 391 runs to progress to the final, in which they faced Trinidad. Fernandes scored half-centuries in both innings of the final, scoring 88 runs in the first and 54 runs in the second to help his side to a four wicket victory.

Early the following year, a weakened English cricket team toured the West Indies, playing four Tests and eight other first-class matches. Fernandes captained British Guiana in both of their matches against the MCC, each of which was lost by an innings. Generally, the West Indies named a different captain for each of their home matches, commonly selecting a player from the host colony for the honour due to financial constraints. Fernandes was chosen as captain for the Test played at Bourda, Georgetown, British Guiana. The first two Tests had resulted in a draw and an English victory. Fernandes won the toss and elected to bat first. Clifford Roach and Errol Hunte opened the batting for the West Indies and scored 144 runs together for the opening partnership before Hunte was out for 53. George Headley then joined Roach at the crease, and the pair took the score onto 336 before Roach was dismissed after reaching his double century. Fernandes and Headley took the score up to 400, of which Fernandes added 22. The remaining batsmen were dismissed for a combined 71; Headley scored a century and the West Indies were all out for 471. The England team was then bowled out for 145, a first innings deficit of 326. Despite the healthy lead, Fernandes chose not to enforce the follow-on, and the West Indies batted again to score 290, leaving England requiring 617 runs in the fourth innings to achieve victory. Patsy Hendren scored a century for the visitors, but no other batsman reached 50 runs, and with just four minutes of the match remaining, the West Indies secured their maiden Test win by 289 runs.

== Later career and life ==
After his single match as West Indies Test captain, Fernandes did not appear for the West Indies again, and only made one further appearance for British Guiana, scoring 78 and 7 against Trinidad in the 1932 Inter-Colonial Tournament final. Fernandes is described in his Wisden Cricketers' Almanack obituary as being "an obdurate batsman", and was praised for his cutting and driving during the 1923 tour of England. He remained a private individual throughout his cricketing career, a characteristic which became stronger after his retirement from cricket. He had one son, Leslie, who played one first-class match for British Guiana in the 1960–61 season, and died in a car accident in 1978 aged 39. After this, Fernandes' health, already poor, deteriorated rapidly, and he died on 8 May 1981, aged 83.

== Notes ==
Sporting positions
Preceded by Nelson Betancourt	West Indies Test cricket captains 1929–30	Succeeded by Karl Nunes
