= International cricket in 1928–29 =

International cricket season

The 1928–29 international cricket season was from September 1928 to April 1929.

== Season overview ==
International tours
Start date	Home team	Away team	Results [Matches]			
Start date	Home team	Away team	Test	ODI	FC	LA
30 November 1928	Australia	England	1–4 [5]	—	—	—
21 February 1929	Jamaica	England	—	—	1–0 [3]	—

== November ==
=== England in Australia ===
The Ashes Test series
No.	Date	Home captain	Away captain	Venue	Result
Test 176	30 Nov–5 December	Jack Ryder	Percy Chapman	Exhibition Ground, Brisbane	England by 675 runs
Test 177	14–20 December	Jack Ryder	Percy Chapman	Sydney Cricket Ground, Sydney	England by 8 wickets
Test 178	29 Dec–5 January	Jack Ryder	Percy Chapman	Melbourne Cricket Ground, Melbourne	England by 3 wickets
Test 179	1–8 February	Jack Ryder	Percy Chapman	Adelaide Oval, Adelaide	England by 12 runs
Test 180	8–16 March	Jack Ryder	Percy Chapman	Melbourne Cricket Ground, Melbourne	Australia by 5 wickets

== February ==
=== England in Jamaica ===
Three-day Match series
No.	Date	Home captain	Away captain	Venue	Result
Match 1	21–25 February	Karl Nunes	Julien Cahn	Melbourne Park, Kingston	Jamaica by 7 wickets
Match 2	27 Feb–2 March	Karl Nunes	Lionel Tennyson	Sabina Park, Kingston	Match drawn
Match 3	5–6 March	Not mentioned	Not mentioned	Palmer's Park, Port Maria	Match drawn
