= Harry Mallett =

English cricketer and administrator

Richard Henry Mallett (14 October 1858 in Louth, Lincolnshire – 29 November 1939 at Ickenham, Middlesex) was a cricket player and administrator.

As a cricketer he was a right-handed batsman and right arm medium pace bowler. He was a stalwart of Durham, playing for them from 1884 right through to 1906, being captain in 1897. He scored 107 for Durham against Cambridgeshire that season. His sole first-class match was for Marylebone Cricket Club (MCC) against London County in 1901.

He took a great interest in the formation of the Minor Counties Cricket Association in 1895 and was the Hon. Secretary from 1897 to 1907. Later he was chairman and President.

He was manager of three West Indian touring sides to England – in 1906, 1923 and 1928 – as well as the West Indian team to Australia in 1930-31 and the English team in the West Indies in 1929-30. He helped form the West Indies Cricket Board of Control in 1927.

He also played rugby for Hartlepool Rovers.
