= International cricket in 1906 =

International cricket season

The 1906 international cricket season was from April 1906 to September 1906.

== Season overview ==
International tours
Start date	Home team	Away team	Results [Matches]			
Start date	Home team	Away team	Test	ODI	FC	LA
16 July 1902	England	West Indies	—	—	1–0 [2]	—
23 July 1902	Scotland	West Indies	—	—	0–1 [1]	—
15 August 1902	Marylebone	Gentlemen of Holland	—	—	1–0 [1]	—

== July ==
=== West Indies in England ===
First-class series
No.	Date	Home captain	Away captain	Venue	Result
Match 1	16–17 July	Not mentioned	Harold Austin	Lord's, London	Marylebone by 6 wickets
Match 2	26–28 July	Not mentioned	Harold Austin	Stanley Park, Blackpool	Match drawn

=== West Indies in Scotland ===
First-class series
No.	Date	Home captain	Away captain	Venue	Result
Match 1	16–17 July	Not mentioned	Harold Austin	Raeburn Place, Edinburgh	West Indies by 4 wickets

== August ==
=== Gentlemen of Holland in England ===
First-class match
No.	Date	Home captain	Away captain	Venue	Result
Match	15–16 August	Not mentioned	Not mentioned	Lord's, London	Marylebone Gentlemen by 8 wickets
