= Allan Browne (cricketer) =

Barbadian cricketer (1888–1941)

Personal information
- Full name: Chester Allan Browne
- Born: 20 July 1888; Robert's Tenantry, St Michael, Barbados
- Died: 12 October 1941 (aged 53); Collymore Rock, St Michael, Barbados
- Batting: Right-handed
- Bowling: Right-arm medium
- Relatives: Snuffy Browne (brother)

Domestic team information
- Years: Team
- 1907-08 to 1929-30: Barbados

Career statistics
Competition	First-class
Matches	23
Runs scored	950
Batting average	33.92
100s/50s	1/7
Top score	131*
Balls bowled	340
Wickets	9
Bowling average	20.88
5 wickets in innings	1
10 wickets in match	0
Best bowling	5/33
Catches/stumpings	11/–
- Source: Cricinfo, 12 October 2019

Chester Allan Browne (20 July 1888 – 12 October 1941) was a Barbadian cricketer who played first-class cricket for Barbados from 1907 to 1929. He represented West Indies in the days before West Indies played Test cricket.

A batsman and occasional bowler, Browne played for West Indies against the touring English teams of 1910-11 and 1912-13. His only first-class century came when Barbados beat British Guiana in 1926–27, when he scored 131 not out, adding 216 for the eighth wicket with Barto Bartlett.
