= Percy Tarilton =

West Indian cricketer

Personal information
- Full name: Percy Hamilton Tarilton
- Born: 8 February 1885; St Margaret's, St John, Barbados
- Died: 18 February 1953 (aged 68); Bayville, St Michael, Barbados
- Nickname: Tim
- Batting: Right-handed
- Bowling: Right-arm slow
- Role: Opening batsman

Domestic team information
- Years: Team
- 1906–1930: Barbados

Career statistics
Competition	First-class
Matches	51
Runs scored	2,777
Batting average	38.56
100s/50s	8/9
Top score	304*
Balls bowled	3
Wickets	1
Bowling average	0.00
5 wickets in innings	0
10 wickets in match	0
Best bowling	1/0
Catches/stumpings	33/–
- Source: CricketArchive, 9 January 2011

Percy Hamilton "Tim" Tarilton (8 February 1885 – 18 February 1953) was a Barbadian cricketer who represented the West Indies in the days before they achieved Test status.

A good driver of the ball, Tarilton made his first-class debut for Barbados in 1905 and played until 1930. He hit his maiden first-class century against Marylebone Cricket Club (M.C.C.) in 1913. The First World War prevented Tarilton from establishing an international reputation, for example through touring England. In 1920, Tarilton scored the first triple-century by a West Indian cricketer, in a match for Barbados against Trinidad when he scored 304 not out. According to C. L. R. James, Tarilton was the best West Indian batsman before 1923. George Challenor was a more stylish batsman and greatly admired in Barbados, but Tarilton was the more reliable. However, Challenor's success on the 1923 tour of England established his reputation. Tarilton, also chosen to tour, scored 554 runs at an average of 21.30, his only century being 109 not out against Nottinghamshire. In 1927, he and Challenor scored 292 in an opening partnership against Trinidad, setting a West Indian record for that wicket which lasted until 1950. His brother Arthur played one first-class match for Jamaica in 1905.

== Bibliography ==
- James, C. L. R. (1983) [1963]. Beyond a Boundary. London: Serpent's Tail. ISBN 1-85242-358-7.
