= Barbados Cricket Buckle =

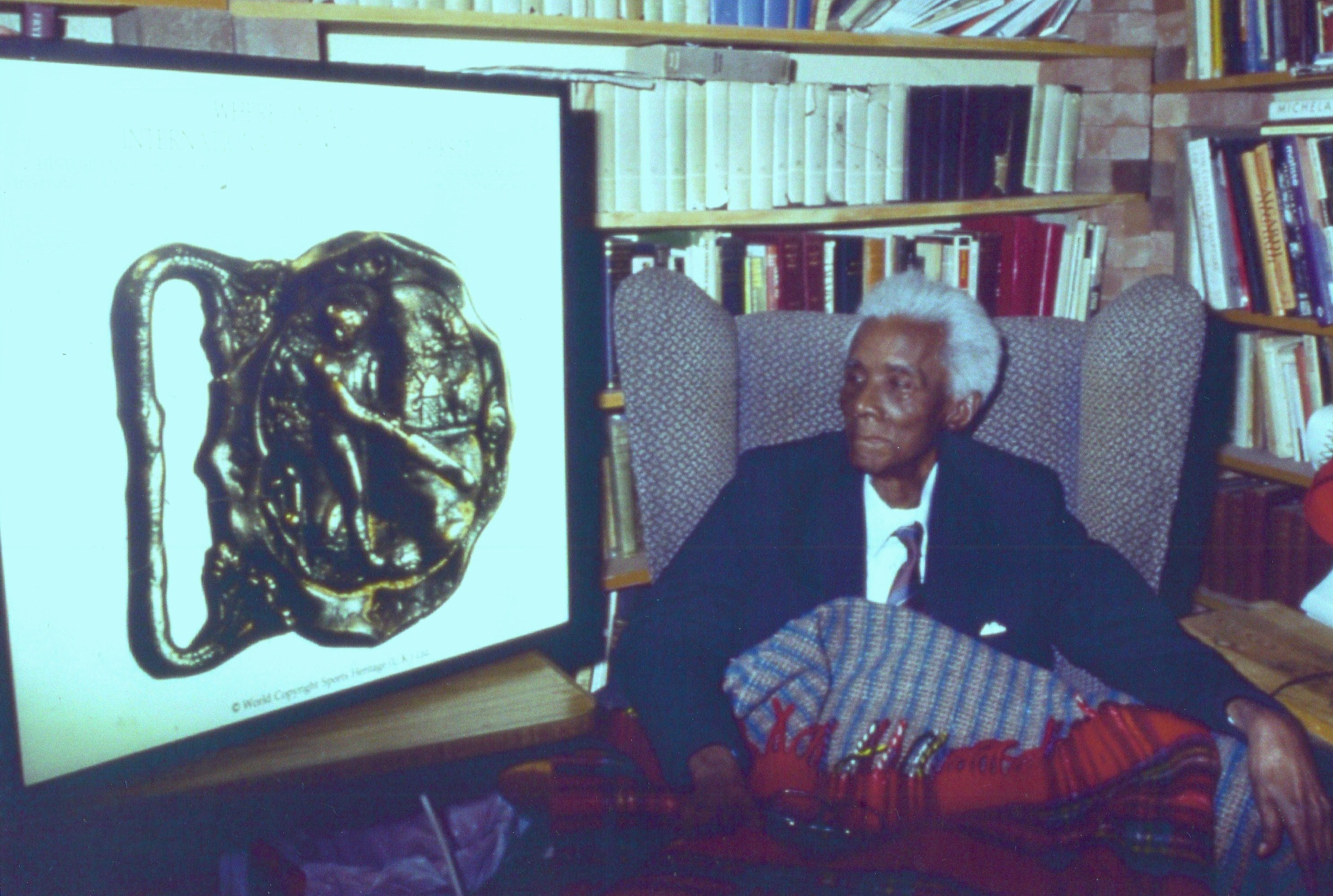
The eminent writer C.L.R. James viewing an enlargement of the Barbados Cricket Buckle at his home in Brixton, London. 1988

The Barbados Cricket Buckle is a repoussé engraving on a belt buckle of a slave playing cricket in Barbados circa 1780–1810. It is believed to be the only known image of a slave playing cricket and is thought to be the oldest surviving artifact depicting cricket outside the British Isles.

"That the belt buckle depicts the slave, unmistakably in bondage, with bat in hand, suggests that the creator must have detected in their cricketing endeavours the germ of the quest for self-expression, if not liberation." Professor Clem Seecharan, Muscular Education.

== History ==
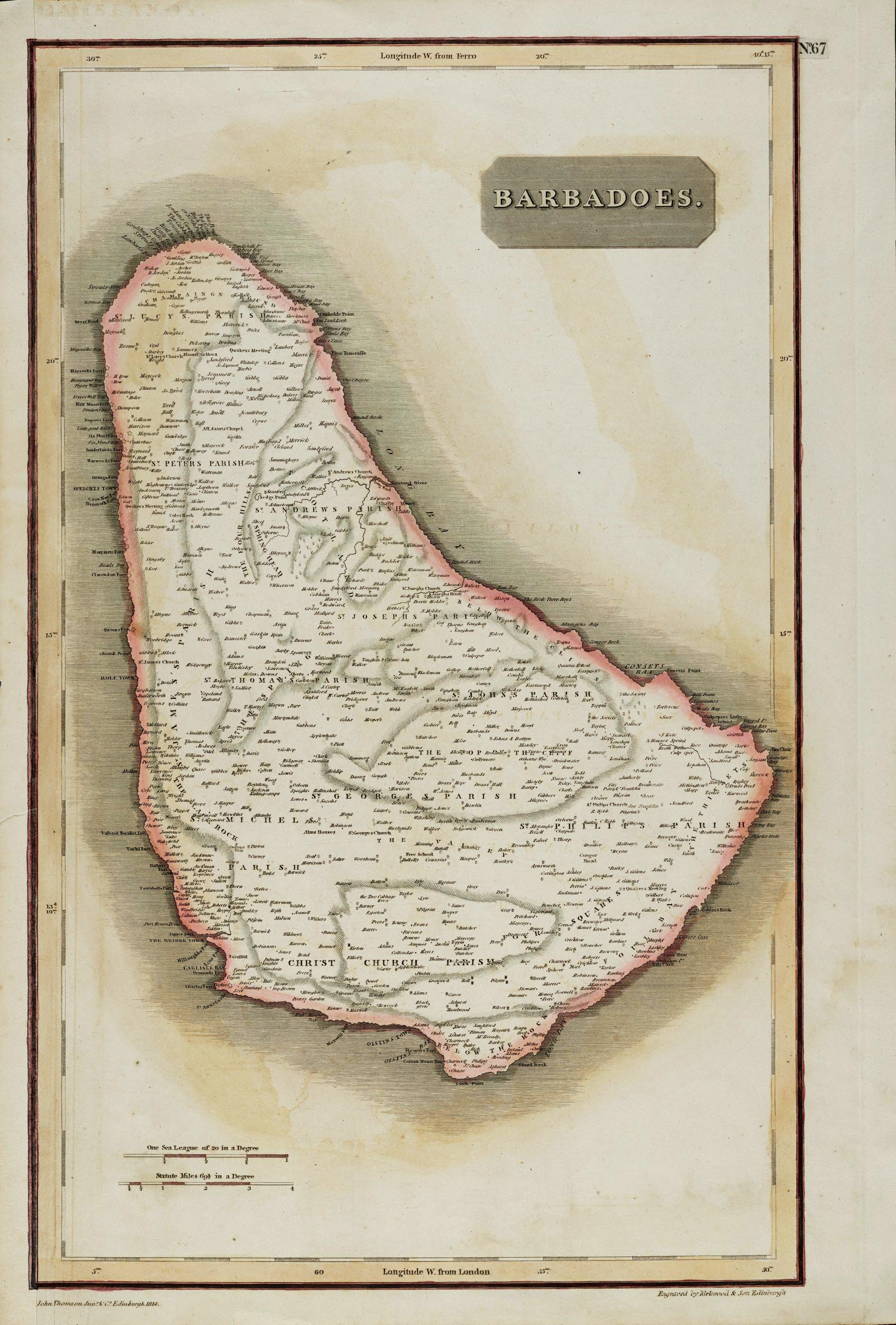
Barbados in 1817

The Buckle was found in 1979 in a gravel spit in the River Tweed, close to the Anglo-Scottish border, by an English holiday-maker, Clive Williams, a retired advertising consultant from London, with a metal detector. It depicts a "well-muscled mulatto, probably the offspring of a white overseer and a black slave mother" at the wicket being bowled out. He is carrying a spliceless bat and wears a slave collar around his neck. To his left a wattle and daub slave hut can be seen and to the right a windmill processing sugarcane by a Caribbean royal palm tree. The engraving is believed to be portraiture although the identity of the slave, if intended as a specific depiction, is unknown. Metallurgical analysis of the Buckle by Oxford University placed its manufacture in the "early Victorian period or before".

The earliest dated reference to cricket in Barbados is 1806, however cricket had been played in "all the West Indian islands from a quite early time". Freed slaves played cricket from the mid-18th century and there are several existing reports of plantation owners encouraging slaves to play cricket. Barbados suffered a highly destructive hurricane in October 1780 which obliterated most palms, windmills and slave huts. The Buckle engraving predates that event. However the three stumps on the Buckle would indicate a date after 1777, when the middle stump was added to the wicket, which had previously had only two stumps.

== Military connection ==
An analysis by the University of Oxford revealed the buckle to be made of "navy brass" (90% copper and 10% zinc). British sailors and soldiers were, for the most part, responsible for exporting cricket out of Great Britain and around Britain's colonial empire. According to Bowen, "Recreation had to be found for troops and sailors; cricket was an ideal source of it." As noted by historian Hilary Beckles, the first references to cricket matches played in Barbados (as reported on by the Barbadian press) reported that they were done so by soldiers and sailors who "played at cricket as a principle stress relieving activity – one that allowed them to 'play being at home' whilst being away from home".

The location of the Buckle in the River Tweed suggested that it may have been owned and originally commissioned by a member of the Hotham family whose estate was upstream, specifically William Hotham, a Royal Navy officer who had been stationed in Barbados from 1779 to 1780. The Hothams were also noted cricketers who were known as "the lucky hits of Westminster". In 1838, James Kelly noted the significance of friendly "mutual confidence and familiarity" between British sailors and Afro-Caribbean slaves, so much so that "In the presence of the sailor the Negro feels a man".

== The Buckle, Cricket and Slavery ==
There has been much debate about the origins of cricket in the West Indies and the role that cricket (a game exported with a "made in England" hallmark) has played in subjugation and emancipation. In his book 40 Million Dollar Slaves, William C. Rhoden recognised that: "In play the slave could become master; the powerless could become powerful. Athletic competition or a mere athletic feat ... cutting cane ....was a free space where bodies bound and scarred by chains could soar". Although focused on US slaves, Rhoden's comments are apposite for the experience of slaves in all nations.

In the first chapter of his book "Muscular Learning", Professor Clem Seecharan reflects at some length on the importance of the Barbados Cricket Buckle recognising that its depiction on a Barbados postage stamp on the 60th anniversary of West Indies cricket was appropriate given cricket's role as a "political instrument" from slavery through emancipation to independence.

Although references to slavery and cricket are extremely rare they do exist. In reference to a diary entry by Jamaican slave owner Thistlewood that cricket was played in June 1778, Professor R Burton was prompted to wonder if the slaves tasked to retrieve the ball when it went beyond the boundary were becoming drawn into the game. This was echoed by Seecharan who notes that in Barbados, cricket was played in clearings in cane fields and slaves were tasked with retrieving the ball and throwing it back into play and points out that "there are accounts of planters too encouraging slaves to play cricket". This encounter of slaves with cricket is supported by former Jamaican Prime Minister Michael Manley in his extensive History of West Indies Cricket, writing that: "the young sons of the slaves were required to bowl at the young sons of the slave owners or to the army officers" adding "of course the sons of the slaves practised batting in their spare time".

The engraving on the Barbados Buckle depicts the point when slaves moved not merely within the boundary but to the batting crease itself. The point when they became, as C.L.R. James put it in Beyond a Boundary, "that genus Britannicus, a fine batsman". Although the Buckle batsman is depicted as being clean bowled, Seecharan highlights the Buckle slave's role as batsman; noting that his possession of bat rather than ball is subversive.

== Uses of the Buckle ==
The Buckle has been featured on coins, stamps and cricket trophies.

=== Coins ===
Specifications
Specification	Gold coin	Silver coin
Denomination	50 dollars	10 dollars
Alloy	22 carat gold	Sterling 0.925 silver
Diameter	29.40mm	38.61mm
Weight	15.98g	28.28g
Issue limit	500 (50 minted)	5,000 (100 minted)

The Central Bank of Barbados authorised the Royal Mint to strike a limited number of proof coins to mark the discovery of the Barbadian Buckle. The coins were minted at the Royal Mint in London.

The reverse of the coin bears a representation of the Barbados Cricket Buckle. A surrounding inscription reads "International Cricket Buckle". The obverse features the Barbados' Coat of Arms. The central element of this official emblem is a shield supported by a dolphin and a pelican. Two Pride of Barbados (Caesalpinia pulcherrima) flowers and one of the island's Bearded Fig Trees (ficus citrifolia) are depicted on the shield. Above the shield is a crest consisting of a raised forearm holding crossed sugar cane stalks above a helmet and mantling. A ribbon bears the inscription "pride and industry", the national motto of Barbados. The coins were finished with a proof with frosted relief.

=== Stamps ===
Stamps featuring the Barbados Buckle (aka International Cricket Buckle) and key cricketers were issued by the respective Postmasters General for the countries of Barbados, Jamaica and Trinidad and Tobago on 6 June 1988.

==== Barbados ====
- 15c – Manny Martindale
- 45c – George Challenor
- 50c – Herman Griffith
- 75c – Harold Austin
- $2.00 – Frank Worrell

101 of the 50c stamp were issued in error featuring a photograph of Edward Lawson "Barto" Bartlett instead of Herman Griffith. These errors were issued through Parcel Post Office in Bridgetown Barbados. All other postal counters had their stocks recovered before 9am on Monday 6 June 1988 and the corrected 50c stamps depicting Griffith were issued on 11 July 1988.

==== Jamaica ====
- 25c – Jackie Hendriks
- 55c – George Headley
- $2.00 – Michael Holding
- $3.00 – Karl Nunes
- $4.00 – Allan Rae

==== Trinidad and Tobago ====
- 30c – George John
- 45c – Learie Constantine
- 75c – Sonny Ramadhin
- $1.50 – Gerry Gomez
- $2.50 – Jeff Stollmeyer

=== Trophy ===
Representations of the Buckle provided the centrepiece of 3 trophies for the Cable & Wireless West Indies-England Test matches and One Day Internationals 1990:

==== Winners of the Buckle Awards for Man of the Match (Test matches) ====
1. Allan Lamb, Sabina Park, Kingston, Jamaica 24 Feb – 1 March 1990 England win.
2. 2nd Test abandoned Georgetown, Guyana
3. Devon Malcolm, Queen's Park Oval, Port-of-Spain, Trinidad 23–28 March 1990. Match drawn.
4. Curtly Ambrose, Kensington Oval, Bridgetown, Barbados 5–10 April 1990. West Indies win.
5. Desmond Haynes, Antigua Recreation Ground, St John's, Antigua 12–16 April 1990. West Indies win.

==== Winners of the Buckle Awards for Man of the Match (One Day Internationals) ====
1. Queen's Park Oval, Port-of-Spain, Trinidad. No result.
2. Queen's Park Oval, Port-of-Spain, Trinidad. No result.
3. Richie Richardson, Sabina Park Kingston Jamaica 3 March 1990. West Indies win.
4. Carlisle Best, Bourda, Georgetown, Guyana. 7 March 1990. West Indies win.
5. Richie Richardson, Kensington Oval, Bridgetown, Barbados. 3 April 1990. West Indies win.
6. Gordon Greenidge, Replacement ODI Bourda, Georgetown, Guyana.

==== Buckle Award for winners of One Day International Series 1990 ====
West Indies captain Desmond Haynes presented with silver gilt depiction of the Buckle. Presentation was made by Lord Sharp, chairman of Cable & Wireless at Kensington Oval Barbados. 3 April 1990.

== See also ==
- Barbados Slave Code
- Cricket in Barbados
- Cricket in the West Indies
