= Clarence Hunter =

Guyanese cricketer

- Hunter in 1923 (standing, second from the right)

Personal information
- Born: 3 February 1891; Georgetown, British Guiana
- Died: 30 September 1930 (aged 39); British Guiana
- Source: Cricinfo, 19 November 2020

Clarence Hunter (3 February 1891 – 30 September 1930) was a cricketer from British Guiana. He played in seven first-class matches for British Guiana from 1910 to 1923, and was part of the West Indian team that toured England in 1923.

== See also ==
- List of Guyanese representative cricketers
