= Raymond Phillips (Jamaican cricketer) =

Jamaican cricketer

- Phillips in 1923 (standing, fourth from the right)

Personal information
- Born: 1900
- Died: 1970 (aged 69–70)
- Source: Cricinfo, 5 November 2020

Raymond Phillips (1900 – 1970) was a Jamaican cricketer. He played in seven first-class matches for the Jamaican cricket team from 1925 to 1928, and was part of the West Indian team that toured England in 1923.

== See also ==
- List of Jamaican representative cricketers
