= Joe Small (cricketer) =

Trinidadian cricketer

Personal information
- Full name: Joseph A Small
- Born: 3 November 1892; Princes Town, Trinidad
- Died: 26 April 1958 (aged 65); Forest Reserve or Pointe-à-Pierre, Trinidad
- Batting: Left-handed
- Bowling: Right-arm medium-fast, off breaks
- Role: all-rounder

International information
- National side: West Indies
- Test debut (cap 11): 23 June 1928 v England
- Last Test: 1 February 1930 v England

Domestic team information
- Years: Team
- 1909–1932: Trinidad

Career statistics
Competition	Tests	First-class
Matches	3	77
Runs scored	79	3,063
Batting average	13.16	26.17
100s/50s	0/1	4/16
Top score	52	133
Balls bowled	366	10,847
Wickets	3	165
Bowling average	61.33	27.81
5 wickets in innings	0	7
10 wickets in match	0	0
Best bowling	2/67	7/49
Catches/stumpings	3/–	71/–
- Source: CricketArchive, 10 January 2010

Joseph A. Small (3 November 1892 – 26 April 1958) was a Trinidadian cricketer who played in West Indies' first Test in their inaugural Test tour of England. He scored the first half century for a West Indies player in Test cricket and played two further Test matches in his career. An all-rounder, he played domestic cricket for Trinidad between 1909 and 1932.

Small first played cricket in Trinidad for a club of low social status. After establishing himself in the Trinidad team, he soon made a name for himself as a batsman and was one of the few black batsmen in the West Indies team at the time. For Trinidad, he was one of the cricketers instrumental in breaking the dominance of the Barbados cricket team in the Inter-Colonial Tournament. He first played for West Indies in 1912–13 and, after the First World War, was chosen to tour England twice. He was moderately successful on the 1923 tour, but was less effective in 1928. Small played in the middle of the batting order; he bowled either medium-fast or off breaks. He died in 1958.

== Early career ==
Small was born in Princes Town, Trinidad, in 1892. He first played cricket for a club in Trinidad called Stingo, which included players from the lowest social class. Cricket in Trinidad at the time was divided along racial lines. For cricket clubs on the island, the colour of a player's skin was crucial. Stingo was described by writer and historian C. L. R. James: "They were plebeians: the butcher, the tailor, the candlestick maker, the casual labourer, with a sprinkling of unemployed. Totally black and of no social status whatever." James described Small as a genial presence on the cricket field: "Small talked to everybody and everybody talked to him: Joe radiated good nature and self-satisfaction." Outside of his cricket career, Small worked for the Stores Department of Trinidad Leaseholds oil company.

Small made his first-class debut for Trinidad on 11 November 1909, playing against a team chosen by WC Shepherd. Small scored 13 and 0 in the match and bowled two over without taking a wicket. The following January, Small made his first appearance for Trinidad in the Inter-Colonial Tournament; he scored seven runs in his only innings and took four for 16 in British Guiana's first innings. In the final against Barbados, he took one wicket in the game and scored 17 and 8 in his two innings. Trinidad won the match. Later that year, Small played against Barbados again, in the final of the next Inter-Colonial Tournament, but had little success in that match, nor in the 1912 tournament when his best score in two games was 15 runs, and he took a total of three wickets. In both instances, Barbados won the tournament.

== International cricketer ==
=== Playing for West Indies ===
During the 1912–13 season, the Marylebone Cricket Club (MCC) toured West Indies, playing in Barbados, Trinidad and British Guiana. The MCC played two matches against each island and faced a representative West Indies side in each location. Small played for Trinidad against the tourists; he made scores of 25 and 26, and took seven for 49 in the MCC first innings, adding another wicket in the second innings. Although that match was lost by Trinidad, the second game was drawn. Small scored 28 runs and took one wicket in the game. He was included in the West Indies team which played at Port of Spain, but had little success.

Small did not play more first-class cricket until after the First World War, but during the war he played in Egypt alongside future West Indian captain Karl Nunes. When he resumed his Trinidad career in 1920, he played in two games against Barbados. In the first, he scored 33 and 62, his first score over fifty in first-class cricket. In the second, he scored 102 not out, his maiden century. He also took three wickets in total in the games, both of which were won by Barbados. In 1921, the Inter-Colonial Tournament resumed, but despite playing both games, Small had little success. During the 1922 tournament, Small scored 33 and 82 against British Guiana and took three for 46 Guiana's first innings. Having beaten Guiana, Trinidad lost to Barbados once more in the final in which Small scored 36 and 5, but took only two wickets in 35 overs.

=== First tour of England ===
In 1923, the West Indies toured England. Five players were selected from Trinidad, including Small. At the time, West Indian batsmen were traditionally white, but according to James, "Joe Small had made for himself a place as a batsman which could not be denied." James writes that there was a perception in Trinidad that Small owed his place to his genial nature, but that the selectors did not want any further black batsmen in the side. When the tour began, Small scored 53 in his second game but bowled infrequently. After a run of low scores, he scored 94 and 68 against Lancashire at Old Trafford Cricket Ground. The press praised the innings, particularly Small's use of the drive. James remembered in later years that Small "startled Old Trafford in 1923 with his driving". After taking six wickets in a minor game, Small took five for 93 and scored 71 against Nottinghamshire in his next first-class match. He bowled 53 overs in the game, by far his greatest number on the tour. He scored a century in another minor match, followed by 85 in a first-class game against Warwickshire and another three first-class fifties in the remainder of the season. In all first-class matches, he scored 776 runs at an average of 31.04, placing him third in the team's batting averages. With the ball, he took 19 wickets at an average of 33.47.

According to C. L. R. James, Small was asked by either Hampshire or Sussex to qualify to play for their team after the tour, as other West Indian cricketers had done after previous tours. However, he refused. According to James, this contrasted with the ambition of others in the team: "Through cricket, steadiness of character and a limited outlook Joe had made a place for himself that was quite satisfactory to him".

=== Inter-Colonial Tournament winner ===
Small returned to play for Trinidad in the 1924 Inter-Colonial Tournament; he scored 62 in the first match but failed in the final against Barbados. He had more success in the February 1925 tournament. After scoring 72, he took six for 43 to help his team defeat British Guiana. Then in the final, Trinidad defeated Barbados for the first time since 1910. Small scored 2 and 36; with the ball he took five for 34 in the first innings and four for 62 in the second innings to bowl Trinidad to a 13-run win. Later in the same year, Trinidad retained their title with a two-wicket victory over British Guiana. Small scored 133 in his first innings and took three wickets in British Guiana's second innings. In January 1926, the MCC toured West Indies again, playing matches against the islands and a combined West Indies side. Small played twice for Trinidad and three times for West Indies against the touring team, but managed just 106 runs with one fifty in eight innings, and took 11 wickets. In January 1927, Small scored 100 against Barbados, but although his team established a lead of 384 runs, Trinidad lost after Barbados scored 726 in their second innings; Small bowled 60 overs in the second innings to take two wickets.

== Test cricketer ==
=== Test match debut ===
West Indies were scheduled to tour England in 1928, including their first Test matches. The selectors organised three trial matches in Barbados in December 1927 and January 1928. Small was dismissed only twice in five innings and scored 217 runs with a top-score of 81. He also took five wickets, and was selected to go on the tour. However, he was less successful than on the 1923 tour. Although several batting records were established by English players in a season that produced good batting conditions, Small's batting average fell and, in common with many of his team-mates, he was generally unsuccessful with the bat. Although he managed a century against Oxford University, he scored only 595 runs at an average of 18.59. He was more successful in bowling; he fulfilled a supporting role with the ball, took 50 wickets at an average of 20.88 and finished third in the team's bowling averages. Wisden Cricketers' Almanack noted that, compared to 1923, "Small fell off considerably" with the bat, and that his "increased measure of success" with the ball did not compensate for the failure of other bowlers.

West Indies lost every game in the three-Test series. In the first Test, Small took two wickets in England's innings and scored 0 in his first innings. But in the second innings, he scored 52, West Indies' first half-century in Test matches. Wisden recorded: "Small, batting in fine form for an hour and a half, enjoyed the distinction of making the only score of over 50 for his side." He also played in the third Test, but took no wickets and scored 0 and 2.

=== End of career ===
During the 1928–29 Inter-Colonial Tournament, Small took four for 14 in Trinidad's first match, but contributed little else as Trinidad won the competition. Later in the year, he took seven for 77 for a West Indies XI against an English team led by Julien Cahn which was playing in Jamaica; he and two others joined the Jamaican team for this game. Trinidad lost to British Guiana in the 1929–30 tournament, and Small did little in the game. An MCC team toured West Indies again that season, and Small played in one of Trinidad's two matches against the touring team. Although he was not successful, he was chosen for the second Test of the four-match series between England and West Indies, played in Trinidad. He took one wicket and scored 20 and 5 in the match. This was his final Test match. In three Test matches, he scored 79 runs at an average of 13.16 and took 3 wickets at 61.33.

Small only played twice more in first-class cricket. There was no first-class cricket in West Indies during the 1930–31 season, but he played in the Trinidad team which won the 1931–32 Inter-Colonial Tournament. In his final first-class innings, he scored 66 and he took a wicket with his final delivery. In his career, he scored 3,063 first-class runs at a batting average of 26.17 and took 165 wickets at an average of 27.81. Small continued to play successfully in South Trinidad in local leagues until the early 1940s. He died following a short illness in Pointe-à-Pierre, Trinidad, on 26 April 1958 at the age of 65, (Note: Some sources give Small's place of death as Forest Reserve, Trinidad. His obituary in the Jamaican Daily Gleaner states he died in Pointe-à-Pierre.) having been largely forgotten in the West Indies. However, in 1984, he was entered into the Trinidad and Tobago Sports Hall of Fame.

== Style and technique ==
His Wisden obituary states that Small was a "tall, loose-limbed all-rounder, who did much fine work for Trinidad". In The Complete Record of West Indian Test Cricketers, Bridgette Lawrence states: "Joe Small was one of West Indies' pioneering all-rounders in Test cricket. He was a gifted batsman with all the strokes at his command, a medium-pace off-break bowler and a competent slip fielder." The Daily Gleaner gave Small credit, along with other Trinidadian cricketers of the time, for overcoming the dominance of the Barbados team. Wisden also described him as a "splendid" slip fielder. Small batted in a variety of positions in the batting order, but usually lower than number three. He sometimes opened the bowling and was capable of bowling quickly. He also bowled off spin at medium pace; his height made him quite difficult for batsmen to face.

C. L. R. James wrote about Small in his book Beyond a Boundary. He described an unimportant match where Small was facing the fast bowler George John; he deliberately hit the ball hard back at John's feet to make him angry. He also wrote about practising with Small: "International cricketers are not as ordinary men. There might be only two boys fielding, but if you bowled Joe a half-volley outside the off stump, he hit with all his force, though he would have to wait until the ball came back from 150 yards. Then he would bowl at me for ten minutes."

== Bibliography ==
- James, C. L. R. (1983) [1963]. Beyond a Boundary. London: Serpent's Tail. ISBN 1-85242-358-7.
- Lawrence, Bridgette; Goble, Ray (1991). The Complete Record of West Indian Test Cricketers. Leicester: ACL and Polar Publishing (UK) Ltd. ISBN 0-9514862-2-5.
- Wynne-Thomas, Peter (1989). The Complete History of Cricket Tours at Home and Abroad. London: Guild Publishing. OCLC 440099345.
