= William Shepherd (Trinidadian cricketer) =

Trinidadian cricketer

Personal information
- Born: 1873; Trinidad
- Died: 1955 (aged 81–82); Barbados
- Source: Cricinfo, 17 November 2020

William Shepherd (1873 – 1955) was a Trinidadian cricketer. He played in fifteen first-class matches for Barbados and Trinidad and Tobago from 1896 to 1910.
