= Harry Ince =

Barbadian cricketer

Personal information
- Full name: Harry Wakefield Ince
- Born: 9 April 1893; Aberdarem Christ Church, Barbados
- Died: 11 May 1978 (aged 85); Bayville, Saint Michael, Barbados
- Batting: Left-handed
- Bowling: Right arm slow
- Role: Batsman

Domestic team information
- Years: Team
- 1912–1930: Barbados

Career statistics
Competition	First-class
Matches	35
Runs scored	1,352
Batting average	29.39
100s/50s	3/4
Top score	167
Balls bowled	462
Wickets	5
Bowling average	48.40
5 wickets in innings	0
10 wickets in match	0
Best bowling	3/34
Catches/stumpings	13/–
- Source: ESPNCricinfo, 1 December 2012

Harry Wakefield Ince (9 April 1893 - 11 May 1978) was a Barbadian cricketer who represented West Indies in matches before they attained Test match status.

== Education ==
Ince attended Harrison College in Bridgetown, Barbados, from which many prominent batsmen emerged in this period.

== Career ==
Ince first played for Barbados in 1913 against the touring Marylebone Cricket Club; he scored 56 on his first-class debut and 57 not out in his second game. Shortly afterwards, he was chosen to play for a representative West Indies team against the MCC and scored 167, his first century in first-class cricket. After the First World War, Ince continued to represent Barbados, scoring centuries in 1920 and 1922, and he was subsequently selected to tour England with the West Indies team in 1923.

In first-class matches that season in England, Ince scored 381 runs at an average of 16.56 with a highest score of 46. After the tour, there were rumours that Ince had argued with the captain of the team. His remaining first-class matches were played for Barbados, but he only passed fifty once more, and played his last match in 1930.

Ince was a fast-scoring batsman who played a range of strokes, and was enormously popular with spectators because of his stylish batting. Some experts considered him to be comparable in style to the famous English batsman Frank Woolley.

== Historical assessment ==
In his book on schools' cricket in colonial Barbados, Keith Sandiford suggests that Ince was the best Barbadian left-handed batsman before the Second World War. Although Ince was unsuccessful in England, his batting average over 18 years for Barbados was 47.12. Late into his career, Ince continued to be highly successful batting in Barbados club cricket.

== Bibliography ==
- Sandiford, Keith A. P. (1998). Cricket Nurseries of Colonial Barbados: The Elite Schools, 1865 - 1966. Kingston, Jamaica: The Press University of the West Indies. ISBN 976-640-046-6.
