= Nelson Betancourt =

West Indian cricketer

Personal information
- Born: 4 June 1887; Trinidad and Tobago
- Died: 12 October 1947 (aged 60); Trinidad and Tobago
- Batting: Right-handed
- Role: Wicket-keeper batsman

International information
- National side: West Indies
- Only Test (cap 23): 1 February 1930 v England

Career statistics
Competition	Tests	First-class
Matches	1	18
Runs scored	52	442
Batting average	26.00	17.00
100s/50s	0/0	0/1
Top score	39	71*
Balls bowled	–	?
Wickets	–	1
Bowling average	–	98.00
5 wickets in innings	–	0
10 wickets in match	–	0
Best bowling	–	1/65
Catches/stumpings	0/0	8/0
- Source: ESPNcricinfo, 30 May 2019

Nelson Betancourt ISO (4 June 1887 – 12 October 1947) was a cricketer, a right-handed wicketkeeper-batsman. He was born in Trinidad and Tobago and died there.

Betancourt's first-class cricket extended from 1905 to 1930 but he played only sporadically, with long periods of cricket inactivity. His first-class debut came in Trinidad's victory over Jamaica at Sabina Park, Kingston in August 1905, but it was more than two years before he made his second appearance. His highest score, 71 not out, was scored against British Guiana in an Inter-Colonial tournament match in 1928/29 but this was the only time that he surpassed fifty runs in an innings.

Betancourt's sole Test for the West Indies came against England at Port of Spain, Trinidad, in February 1930, this being the second Test of the series. In a match won by the visitors, he captained the West Indies (on account of the home administration's policy of having a local captain for each match of the series) and scored 39 and 13. At 42 years and 242 days old, Betancourt remains the oldest Test debutant for the West Indies. His death in 1947 went unrecorded in cricket circles and therefore no obituary appeared in Wisden.

He was latterly Assistant Inspector of Mines in Trinidad and sat occasionally in the Legislative Council. He received the Imperial Service Order upon his retirement in 1946.

== Sources ==
- World Cricketers – A Biographical Dictionary by Christopher Martin-Jenkins, published by Oxford University Press (1996)
- The Wisden Book of Test Cricket, Volume 1 (1877–1977) compiled and edited by Bill Frindall, published by Headline (1995)
- The Complete Record of West Indian Test Cricketers by Bridgette Lawrence & Ray Goble, published by ACL & Polar Publishing (1991)

Preceded by Teddy Hoad	West Indies Test cricket captains 1929–30	Succeeded by Maurice Fernandes
