= West Indian cricket team in England in 1928 =

International cricket tour

The West Indies cricket team that toured England in the 1928 season was the first to play Test cricket. The team was not very successful, losing all three Tests by an innings and winning only five of the 30 first-class matches played.

== The background to the tour ==
In 1926, the Imperial Cricket Conference, forerunner of the International Cricket Council, allowed for the first time delegates from India, New Zealand and the West Indies to attend. The three were invited to organise themselves into cricket boards that could, in future, select representative teams to take part in Test matches, which had hitherto been restricted to sides from England, Australia and South Africa.

The West Indian cricket tour of England in 1928 was the first of these new Test-playing ventures, and it was backed heavily by the cricket establishment because of the success of the 1923 West Indian cricket team in England, when the side won 12 matches.

== The West Indies touring team ==
The West Indies team had 17 members, four each from Jamaica, Trinidad (now Trinidad and Tobago) and British Guiana (now Guyana) and five from Barbados. The side was captained by Karl Nunes, who had been vice-captain of the 1923 touring side.

The players were:

Player	Date of birth	Batting style	Bowling style	First class team
Karl Nunes (c)	7 June 1894	Left hand	Wicketkeeper	Jamaica
Vibart Wight (vc)	28 July 1902	Right hand	-	British Guiana
Barto Bartlett	10 March 1906	Right hand	-	Barbados
Snuffy Browne	8 October 1890	Right hand	Right arm medium	British Guiana
George Challenor	28 June 1888	Right hand	Right arm medium	Barbados
Learie Constantine	21 September 1901	Right hand	Right arm fast	Trinidad
Maurice Fernandes	12 August 1897	Right hand	-	British Guiana
George Francis	11 December 1897	Right hand	Right arm fast	Trinidad
Herman Griffith	1 December 1893	Right hand	Right arm fast	Barbados
Teddy Hoad	29 January 1896	Right hand	Right arm leg-break	Barbados
Freddie Martin	12 October 1893	Left hand	Slow left-arm orthodox	Jamaica
James Neblett	13 November 1901	Right hand	Right arm leg-break	British Guiana
Ernest Rae	8 November 1897	Right hand	Right arm leg-break	Jamaica
Clifford Roach	13 March 1904	Right hand	Right arm leg-break	Trinidad
Wilton St Hill	6 July 1893	Right hand	Right arm medium	Trinidad
Tommy Scott	4 August 1892	Right hand	Right arm leg-break	Jamaica
Joe Small	3 November 1892	Right hand	Right arm fast-medium	Trinidad

All of the 17 players with the exceptions of Neblett and Rae played in at least one of the three Test matches: Neblett later played once for West Indies against England in 1934-35, but Rae, the father of the later Test cricketer Allan Rae, never played in a Test match.

Seven of the 17 – Nunes, Browne, Challenor, Constantine, Fernandes, Francis and Small – had toured with the 1923 touring team, but five years on the batsmen Challenor, Fernandes and Small were unable to repeat their success of 1923, and Francis and Browne were less successful in bowling. Lack of a frontline wicketkeeper – George Dewhurst from the 1923 team did not play in 1928 – meant that Nunes was the main wicketkeeper.

== Test series ==
Three Test matches were arranged, each of three days' duration.

=== 1st Test ===
23–26 June 1928
Scorecard

England	v	West Indies
401 (125.4 overs); GE Tyldesley 122; LN Constantine 4/82 (26.4 overs)		177 (83.3 overs); FR Martin 44; VWC Jupp 4/37 (23 overs)
		166 (f/o) (73.1 overs); JA Small 52; AP Freeman 4/37 (21.1 overs)

England won by an innings and 58 runs
Lord's, London
Umpires: LC Braund and F Chester

- England won the toss and elected to bat.
- 24 June was taken as a rest day
- DR Jardine and H Smith (both ENG), and all the West Indies side, made their Test debuts.

Jack Hobbs being unfit, England, on winning the toss, opened with Herbert Sutcliffe and Charlie Hallows, and the three West Indian fast bowlers, Constantine, Griffith and Francis, plus Browne, caused early discomfort. But though wickets fell fairly regularly, runs were also scored very fast. Ernest Tyldesley made 122 and captain Percy Chapman 50, and at the end of the first day England had reached 382 for eight. Constantine, who finished with four for 82, ended the innings quickly on the second morning. West Indies, opening with Martin and Challenor, reached 70 without loss by lunchtime, and the partnership went to 86 before Martin was out to Maurice Tate for 44. Five wickets then fell for 10 runs and though Nunes made 37, Vallance Jupp and Tich Freeman took the last five wickets in two hours. Following on, the West Indies did worse, and lost their first six wickets for just 44 runs before the end of the second day. On the final morning, 52 from Small and 44 from Browne brought the second innings total to 166 before the match ended after 90 minutes' play.

=== 2nd Test ===
21–24 July 1928
Scorecard

West Indies	v	England
206 (105.4 overs); CA Roach 50; AP Freeman 5/54 (33.4 overs)		351 (107.2 overs); DR Jardine 83; HC Griffith 3/69 (25 overs)
115 (47.3 overs); WH St Hill 38; AP Freeman 5/39 (18 overs)

England won by an innings and 30 runs
Old Trafford, Manchester
Umpires: A Morton and WR Parry

- West Indies won the toss and elected to bat.
- 22 July was taken as a rest day
- ELG Hoad and OC Scott (both WIN) made their Test debuts.

The tourists made two changes, bringing in Hoad, who had made an unbeaten 149 in a two-day match against Worcestershire three days before this Test started, and Scott. They replaced Fernandes and Small. On a lifeless pitch, West Indies won the toss and batted. Roach, promoted to open, made 50 and put on 48 with Challenor and 46 with Martin. The team then collapsed to 133 for six before Browne and Scott took the total beyond 200. Freeman took five wickets for 54 runs for England. Hobbs, restored to health, and Sutcliffe made 119 for the first England wicket. After three quick wickets, Wally Hammond with 63 put on 120 with Douglas Jardine. A further small collapse followed, including Chapman retiring injured, and Jardine, top scorer with 83, but the tail took the total to 351. In the second innings, West Indies lost two wickets quickly, but Martin and St Hill put on 55 and at the end of the second day, West Indies were 71 for four. The innings ended rather abjectly on the third morning, only 44 further runs being made in 50 minutes. Freeman again took five wickets, this time for 39 runs, to finish with match figures of 10 for 93.

=== 3rd Test ===
11–14 August 1928
Scorecard

West Indies	v	England
238 (80 overs); CA Roach 53; MW Tate 4/59 (21 overs)		438 (103.5 overs); JB Hobbs 159; HC Griffith 6/103 (25.5 overs)
129 (52.4 overs); FR Martin 41; AP Freeman 4/47 (21.4 overs)

England won by an innings and 71 runs
The Oval, London
Umpires: J Hardstaff and TW Oates

- West Indies won the toss and elected to bat.
- 12 August was taken as a rest day
- EL Bartlett and CV Wight (both WIN), and M Leyland (ENG) made their Test debuts.

The third match followed a very similar pattern to the second, with the West Indians making a good start through Roach (53) and Challenor (46), but no other batsman getting beyond the 30s. The total of 238 was, though, the highest of the series for the touring side. Hobbs and Sutcliffe made 155 for the first wicket, and Hobbs and Tyldesley then added 129 before Hobbs was out for 159 with the score at 284. Five further wickets then fell in the next hour for 49 runs, all of them to Griffith, whose innings figures of six for 103 were the best of the series for the West Indies. Tate and Harold Larwood then added 61 in 25 minutes and the last three wickets made 105 runs. West Indies' second innings, as in the previous Tests, began badly, and only a stubborn 41 from Martin enabled the side to reach three figures. As at Lord's and Old Trafford, the match was over before lunch on the third day.

== Other matches ==
Including the three Tests, 30 first-class matches were played on the tour, plus six other games. The West Indians won just seven of these 36 matches (five of the first-class games) and lost 12.

By the end of May, the touring side had won matches against Derbyshire and Cambridge University, plus a minor match against Northumberland, and had drawn all the other games. Defeat by Ireland in a three-day game was followed by a tight victory over Middlesex. But the final first-class game before the First Test saw a sensational defeat by the Minor Counties, who won by 42 runs after being made to follow on.

In the final two months of the season, there were good victories over Northamptonshire and Kent, plus a minor match against Staffordshire, for whom Sydney Barnes, aged 55, took five wickets. But there were heavy defeats by Yorkshire, with the tourists dismissed for 58 all out in the second innings, by Warwickshire, and by Sussex, even though the county rested Maurice Tate, Duleepsinhji and James Langridge. A first-class side representing Wales and including Sydney Barnes also won; Barnes took 12 wickets in this match.

At the end of the tour, the West Indians lost three festival matches at Eastbourne, Folkestone and Scarborough.

== Individual performances ==
The star performer on the tour was Learie Constantine, though he failed in the Test matches. He scored the most first-class runs, with 1,381 at an average of 34.52 runs per innings, took the most first-class wickets, with 107 at 22.95 each, and was the only player to score three centuries in the first-class matches.

Martin, Challenor and Roach also scored more than 1,000 runs in the first-class matches, and Hoad, who came good in the second half of the tour, did so in all matches. Challenor, who had scored 1,556 first-class runs at an average of 51.86 and with six centuries in 1923, made just 1,074 runs at 27.53 runs per innings and failed to score a first-class century on the 1928 tour. Griffith took 103 wickets in all matches.

== Verdict and aftermath ==
The poor performance of the West Indian team led to some unfavourable comment. Wisden for 1929, reporting on the tour as a whole, was damning. "So far from improving upon the form of their predecessors, the team of 1928 fell so much below it that everybody was compelled to realise that the playing of Test matches between England and West Indies was a mistake," it said. "Whatever the future may have in store, the time is certainly not yet when the West Indies can hope to challenge England with a reasonable hope of success."

The official verdict was less condemnatory, and MCC reported of the West Indies side that "much of their cricket was of a high order". MCC agreed to send a side to the West Indies for four Test matches in 1929-30. This tour coincided with a second tour to New Zealand, where the first Test matches against that country were played, and several leading England players opted out of both of the tours. But what was, in effect, an England second eleven had to settle for a shared series, with each side winning one match. This series saw the emergence of George Headley as the first great West Indian batting star, and Wisden's prediction of a long haul towards parity with England proved pessimistic.
