= Teddy Hoad =

Barbadian cricketer (1896–1986)

Personal information
- Full name: Edward Lisle Goldsworthy Hoad
- Born: 29 January 1896; Richmond, Saint Michael, Barbados
- Died: 5 March 1986 (aged 90); Bridgetown, Barbados
- Batting: Right-handed
- Bowling: Leg-break

International information
- National side: West Indies
- Test debut (cap 12): 21 July 1928 v England
- Last Test: 22 July 1933 v England

Domestic team information
- Years: Team
- 1922–1938: Barbados

Career statistics
| Competition | Tests | First-class |
|---|---|---|
| Matches | 4 | 62 |
| Runs scored | 98 | 3,502 |
| Batting average | 12.25 | 38.91 |
| 100s/50s | 0/0 | 8/14 |
| Top score | 36 | 174* |
| Balls bowled | 0 | 3,405 |
| Wickets | – | 53 |
| Bowling average | – | 35.98 |
| 5 wickets in innings | – | 1 |
| 10 wickets in match | – | 0 |
| Best bowling | – | 5/84 |
| Catches/stumpings | 1/– | 25/– |
- Source: CricketArchive, 10 January 2010

Edward Lisle Goldsworthy Hoad (January 29, 1896 – March 5, 1986) was a Barbadian cricketer who played in West Indies' inaugural Test tour of England. He was the captain in the West Indies' first home Test in 1930. In all he played four Tests.

Hoad was born in Richmond, Saint Michael, Barbados. Although he had modest Test performances, he had some impressive results in first-class matches against English sides in both the 1928 and 1929-30 tours, scoring 149 not out against Worcestershire in 1928 and 147 for Barbados in 1930.

He died in Bridgetown, Barbados at the age of ninety. His son also played for Barbados.

| Preceded by none | West Indies Test cricket captains 1929-30 | Succeeded by Nelson Betancourt |
