= Clifford Roach =

Trinidadian cricketer (1904–1988)

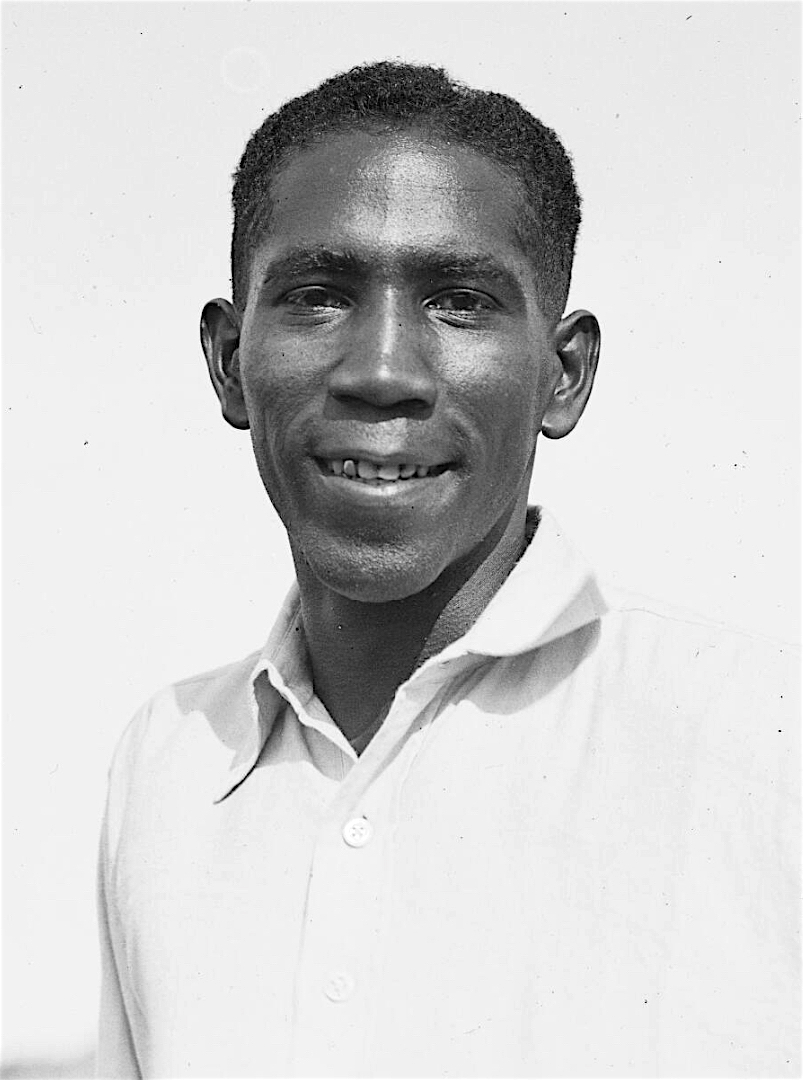

Personal information
- Full name: Clifford Archibald Roach
- Born: 13 March 1904; Port of Spain, Trinidad and Tobago
- Died: 16 April 1988 (aged 84); Port of Spain, Trinidad and Tobago
- Batting: Right-handed
- Bowling: Leg break

International information
- National side: West Indies
- Test debut (cap 9): 23 June 1928 v England
- Last Test: 8 January 1935 v England

Domestic team information
- Years: Team
- 1923–1938: Trinidad

Career statistics
Competition	Tests	First-class
Matches	16	98
Runs scored	952	4,851
Batting average	30.70	28.04
100s/50s	2/6	5/25
Top score	209	209
Balls bowled	222	958
Wickets	2	5
Bowling average	51.50	105.20
5 wickets in innings	0	0
10 wickets in match	0	0
Best bowling	1/18	1/18
Catches/stumpings	5/–	43/–
- Source: Cricket Archive, 27 October 2010

Clifford Archibald Roach (13 March 1904 – 16 April 1988) was a Trinidadian cricketer who played in West Indies' first Test match in 1928. Two years later, he scored the West Indies' first century in Test matches, followed two matches later by the team's first double century. Roach played for Trinidad, but before having any great success at first-class level, he was chosen to tour England with a West Indies team in 1928 and scored over 1,000 runs. When England played in the West Indies in 1930, he recorded his ground-breaking centuries but had intermittent success at Test level afterwards. He toured Australia in 1930–31 and returned to England in 1933, when he once more passed 1,000 runs, but was dropped from the team in 1935. Within three years, he lost his place in the Trinidad team. Roach was generally inconsistent, but batted in an attacking and attractive style. Outside of cricket, he worked as a solicitor. Later in his life, he suffered from diabetes which necessitated the amputation of both his legs.

== Early life and career ==
Roach was born in Port of Spain, Trinidad, and attended St Mary's College, for whom he played football. He played his early cricket on matting pitches in Trinidad, (Note: Matting pitches were used as an alternative to turf in some parts of the world where it was difficult to produce a good grass pitch. The matting was made of jute or coir, and laid over a surface which may have been sand, grass, soil or gravel.) and represented Maple, a cricket club for middle-class players. He was coached by George John from an early age. He made his first-class debut for Trinidad in February 1924, when he scored 44 and 22 against British Guiana. He did not play for Trinidad again until 1926, when he faced the touring Marylebone Cricket Club (MCC) in two games without much success. Despite another unproductive match for Trinidad in January 1927, this time against Barbados, Roach was named in the Trinidad press later that year as a likely candidate to join the West Indies team to tour England in 1928. Already judged a leading batsman in Trinidad, other factors cited in his favour included his fielding, given that West Indian teams had been inconsistent in that discipline, and an ability to bowl. That December, he passed fifty for the first time in first-class matches, when he scored 84 runs for a combined Trinidad and Guiana team. The latter match was played to assist in selecting a team for the forthcoming West Indian tour of England; Roach played a further two such games without success in early 1928. Even so, he was chosen in the touring party; previews again suggested his fielding and ability to bowl played a part in his selection. Meanwhile, he trained as a solicitor, and successfully took his examinations shortly before the tour began.

== Test match cricketer ==
=== First tour and Test debut ===
The West Indian tour of England in 1928 included the team's first Test matches. However, all three Test matches were lost by an innings and the poor overall results led commentators to judge the team unsuccessful. The review of the tour in Wisden Cricketers' Almanack suggested: "Everybody was compelled to realise that the playing of Test Matches between England and West Indies was a mistake". The batsmen in particular struggled to adapt to the unfamiliar conditions and the wet summer. The Wisden report singled out Roach as a success, and the best of the batsmen who had not toured England before: "Possessed of strong defence and a nice variety of stroke—especially on the off-side—he created a distinctly favourable impression, and he added to his abilities as a run-getter the further qualifications of being a brilliant fieldsman—especially at cover point." In total, Roach scored 1,222 first-class runs during the tour at an average of 26.56. Although he did not score a century, he passed fifty nine times, with a highest score of 92 against the Minor Counties. He finished fifth in the first-class batting averages for the team, and also took two wickets. Making his Test debut in the first Test match, Roach scored 0 and 16. In the second match, promoted to open the batting, he scored 50 and 0, and in the final game had scores of 53, part of an opening partnership of 91 in 70 minutes with George Challenor, and 12. He was fourth in the West Indian Test batting averages, but only one other player, Joe Small, reached fifty in the series, and he only did so once.

=== Tests against England and Australia ===
Returning to Trinidad, Roach scored two fifties in three first-class matches in 1929. In 1930 the MCC undertook a tour of the West Indies which included four Test matches—the first Tests to be played in the West Indies. The MCC side was not at full international strength; it included players who were either just beginning or just ending their international careers, and several star English bowlers were missing. (Note: On most MCC tours of the lesser Test playing countries, leading players often chose not to tour, opting to rest at home. The side was usually competitive enough without them, and only on the more taxing tour of Australia was a fully representative team selected.) Roach played in the first Test and, opening the batting, scored 122 in the first innings, the first Test century for West Indies and Roach's maiden century in first-class cricket. He hit the English bowler Wilfred Rhodes for successive fours to reach three figures. In his second innings, he scored 77 runs and the match was drawn. After the Test, Roach played twice for Trinidad against the MCC team without much success. When he failed to score in either innings of the second Test, played in Trinidad, he had scored just 24 runs in his last six innings. Disappointed with his form, he intended to miss the next Test, but the selectors picked him anyway, and he scored 209, the first double-century for the West Indies in Test matches. He shared partnerships of 144 for the first wicket with Errol Hunte, and 192 with George Headley for the second wicket. His second hundred runs were scored in 74 minutes. In his history of West Indies cricket, Michael Manley describes Roach's innings as "dashing" but containing an element of luck which contrasted with the safe play of Headley. West Indies eventually won the match comfortably to record their first win in Test matches. Roach did little during the final Test, but finished the series with 467 runs at 58.37, placing him third in the team batting averages. Only Roach and Headley from the home team played in every Test match. Inter-island politics meant that selectors tended to pick players from the island hosting the Test. In the series, 29 players represented the West Indies and the team had a different captain in each match.

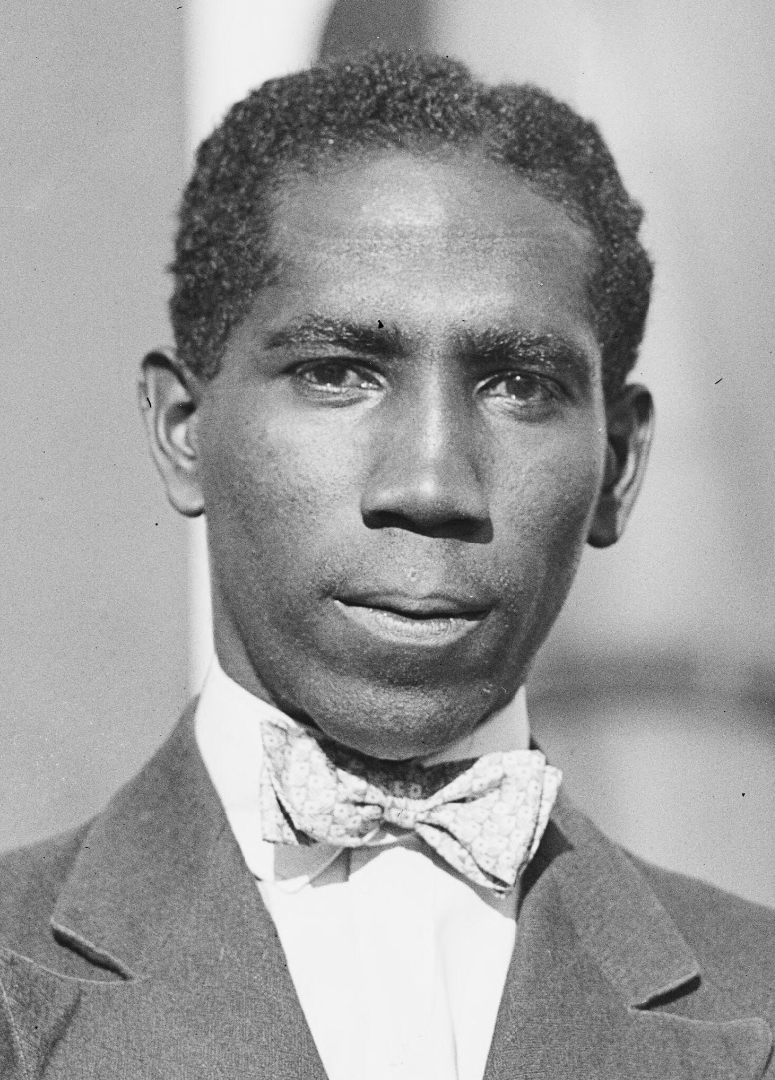
Roach during the West Indies' 1930–31 tour of Australia

Late in 1930, the West Indies team toured Australia for the first time. They played five Test matches in the 1930–31 season, losing all but the last which they won by 30 runs. For much of the tour, the team was outplayed. Roach was expected to be one of the leading batsman, along with Headley, on the tour, and he scored 56 in the first Test, but only reached double figures twice in his next seven Test innings until he scored 31 and 34 in the final game. He finished fifth in the team's Test batting averages with 194 runs at 19.40. In other first-class matches, he scored 104 against Victoria and, in total, scored 637 runs at 24.50. Contemporary reports suggested that he was never out of form but possibly tried to attack the bowling too much. A report in the Sporting Chronicle, a Trinidad newspaper, in April 1931 suggested, without elaboration, that he "was not himself" during the tour, which accounted for his poor form.

=== Second tour of England ===
Roach was unsuccessful playing for Trinidad in 1932. His poor form led some critics to call for his exclusion from the West Indies team; he failed in a trial match in early 1933, but was picked to tour England during the 1933 season. The West Indies team did not perform as well as expected, and lost the Test series 2–0, and their batting was generally unsuccessful. After a slow start, Roach scored 67 against Hampshire then, in his next innings, 180 against Surrey in 170 minutes. In the latter innings, described by Wisden as the most dazzling innings on the tour, he scored a century before lunch. Wisden noted: "The Surrey bowling on that occasion admittedly was moderate, but, at home from the very start, Roach cut, drove and hooked in a style seen only on very rare occasions." After other substantial innings against County teams, he failed to score in either innings of the first Test. He was more successful in the other two Tests, scoring 64 in the second Test and 56 in the third, reaching fifty in 33 minutes during the latter innings. The Wisden report stated: "If not nearly so sound as Headley, Roach was easily the best man in the team to watch, his batting on many occasions being brilliant to a degree. Nothing, indeed, in the whole tour was so dazzling as the innings of 180 Roach played against Surrey at the Oval". In total, Roach scored 1,286 runs at 25.72 in first-class matches to finish ninth in the team averages, and 141 runs at 23.50 in Tests. Wisden suggested that, had his defensive abilities matched the style of his strokeplay, he would have been more successful. A review in a Trinidad newspaper suggested that Roach was the "best stroke maker" in England during the 1933 season, but he was undependable when his side faced adverse circumstances. There were suggestions that Roach should have dropped down the batting order to counter his periods of poor form, but the captain, Jackie Grant, suggested that his aggressive approach made him an attraction and that he was happier opening the batting.

=== Final years of career and later life ===
Roach played twice for Trinidad in 1934. Unsuccessful in his first game in February, in September he scored 128 against British Guiana. When MCC toured West Indies in 1934–35, he was selected for the first Test, scoring 9 and 10 not out, but this was his final game for West Indies. In 16 Tests, he scored 952 runs at an average of 30.70. He also took two wickets.

Roach continued to play for Trinidad. In the same month as his final Test, he played for Trinidad against the MCC team, scoring 28 and 0. He played twice for the team in 1936, scoring a fifty in the second game. His final first-class games came in 1937. Against Barbados, he scored 89, and in his final game he scored 7 and 28 against British Guiana. As late as 1939, critics suggested that Roach should be picked to play for Trinidad, and even for the West Indies team, but he never played again. In 98 first-class games, he scored 4,851 runs at 28.04, with five centuries, and took five wickets. During the Second World War, he played several non-first-class matches in England for a team styled a "West Indies XI". In later life, Roach suffered with diabetes; as a result, he had both legs amputated, the first in 1968 and the second in 1970. He had artificial legs fitted in England, but continued to work as a solicitor throughout.

Roach also had some success as a footballer. He played for the Maple team, for whom he played at inside right until the late 1930s, but also represented Trinidad at international level. He and his wife, Edna, had nine children. He died in Port of Spain in 1988, aged 84.

== Style and impact ==
Roach's batting was marked by inconsistency. In summing up his career, the historian Bridgette Lawrence wrote that his "style took him to the heights and depths of batting". She suggests that he provided a bridge in West Indian batting between George Challenor, the first notably successful batsman to represent the West Indies, and George Headley, the leading West Indian batsman before the Second World War. Whether successful or not, Roach concentrated on entertaining spectators through aggressive batting.

Michael Manley described Roach as "swashbuckling", playing risky but attractive shots outside off stump. He could play with equal ability from either the front foot—with his weight going forward into a batting shot—or back foot. George John, his former coach, believed that he was more effective on the back foot, and sometimes failed to move his feet when batting, but that his ability to deflect the ball by the movements of his wrist was unsurpassed in the whole world. John also suggested that Roach might struggle to play one delivery but then hit the next for six. The writer C. L. R. James described how he attacked the short ball outside off stump: "[He moves] his right foot back and across as far as it will go, and then let him lift his bat as high as he possibly can and from that position let it go like a piston at the unfortunate ball." The resulting stroke left little chance for the fielders." From this description, the journalist Frank Keating suggested a playing resemblance to Gordon Greenidge. On another occasion, James described Roach as "an untalkative but cheerful soul." Roach's form may have been affected by his lack of a regular partner to open the batting; he frequently had different partners from one Test to the next. He was a very effective fielder, especially in the covers.

In 1984, he was entered into the Trinidad and Tobago Sports Hall of Fame, while in 2008, he was among former footballers honoured by the Trinidad and Tobago Football Federation at their centenary awards.

== Bibliography ==
- James, C. L. R. (1983) [1963]. Beyond a Boundary. London: Serpent's Tail. ISBN 1-85242-358-7.
- Lawrence, Bridgette; Goble, Ray (1991). The Complete Record of West Indian Test Cricketers. Leicester: ACL and Polar Publishing (UK) Ltd. ISBN 0-9514862-2-5.
- Manley, Michael (1995) [1988]. A History of West Indies Cricket. London: Andre Deutsch. ISBN 0-233-98937-4.
- Wynne-Thomas, Peter (1989). The Complete History of Cricket Tours at Home and Abroad. London: Guild Publishing. OCLC 440099345.
