= Harold Austin =

West Indian cricketer

H.B.G. Austin
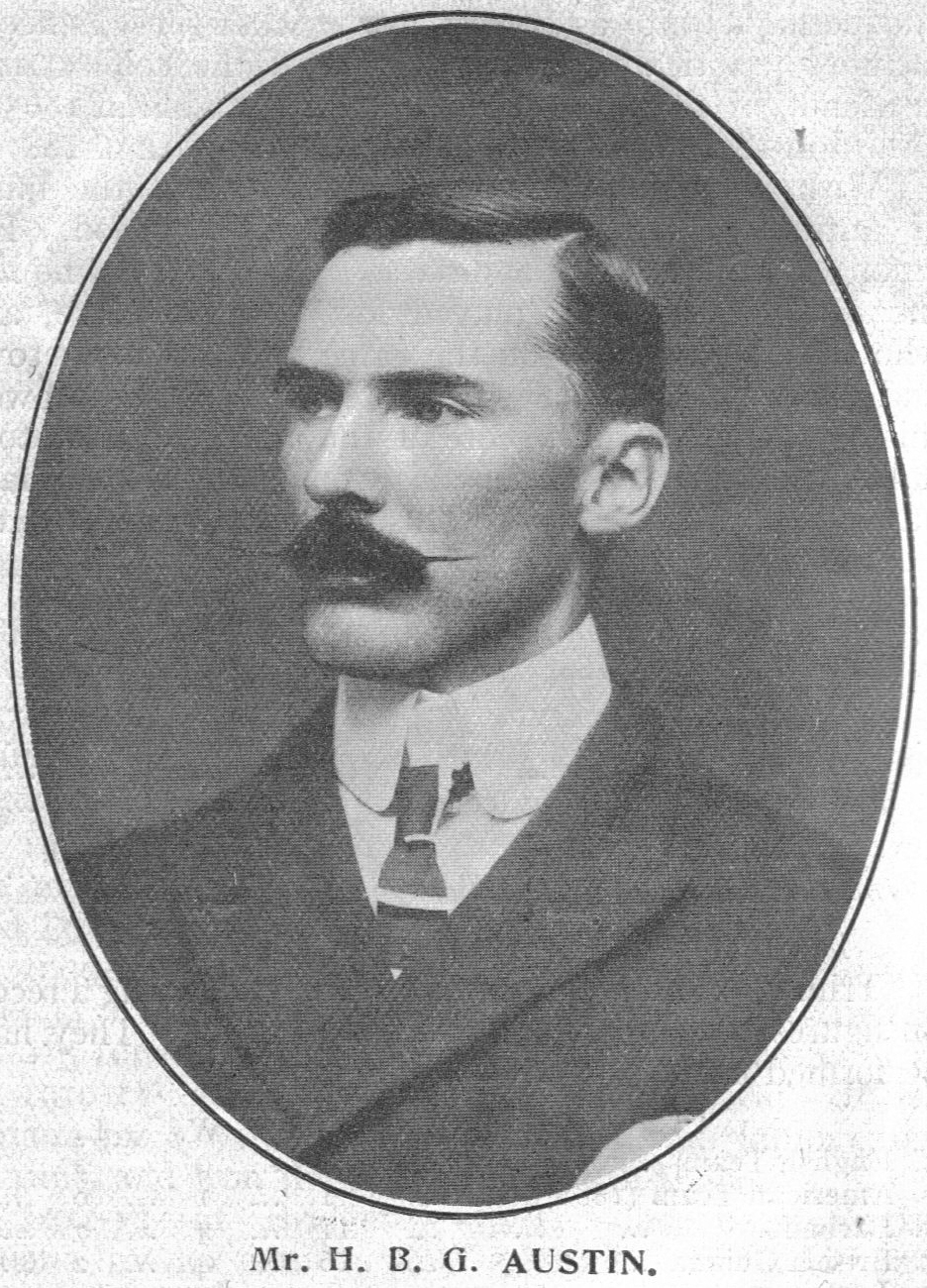

Personal information
- Full name: Harold Bruce Gardiner Austin
- Born: 15 July 1877; Enmore, St Michael, Barbados
- Died: 27 July 1943 (aged 66); Collymore Rock, St Michael, Barbados
- Batting: Right-handed
- Role: Batsman

Domestic team information
- Years: Team
- 1894/95–1925/26: Barbados
- 1909–1926: MCC
- FC debut: 19 January 1895 Barbados v RS Lucas' XI
- Last FC: 7 January 1928 Barbados Born v The Rest

Career statistics
Competition	First-class
Matches	65
Runs scored	2,643
Batting average	28.41
100s/50s	1/17
Top score	129
Balls bowled	538
Wickets	15
Bowling average	20.13
5 wickets in innings	0
10 wickets in match	0
Best bowling	3/7
Catches/stumpings	46/3
- Source: CricketArchive, 8 July 2011

Sir Harold Bruce Gardiner Austin OBE (15 July 1877 – 27 July 1943) was a Barbadian politician and cricketer. He was known as H.B.G..

Austin was the son of John Gardiner Austin, a shipper connected with the sugar trade, and his wife Dorothy and was educated at Harrison College, Barbados. He married Lillian Marie Dennehy in St. Lucia in 1904 and had two daughters.

Austin served as honorary consul for the United Kingdoms of Sweden and Norway in Bridgetown from 5 December 1902.

Austin was awarded the OBE in 1927, was knighted in 1935. He lost his seat to Charles Duncan O'Neal in 1932 by one vote. Austin was Speaker of the House of Assembly of Barbados 1934-1937, 1938-1942.

Austin captained the West Indian cricket teams that toured England in 1906 and 1923. He was a right hand batsman and occasional wicket-keeper. He was one of a family of cricketers which included his brothers John ("Ruff"), Arthur ("A.P.G."), Malcolm ("M.P.G.") and Francis. H.B.G.'s younger daughter Clodagh married Gilbert White who played cricket for the Army in 1938.

In June 1988 Austin was celebrated on a 75c Barbadian stamp alongside the Barbados Cricket Buckle.

== Cricket career ==
Harold Austin made his debut in important matches aged just 17 playing for Barbados against Slade Lucas's team in the 1894–95 season. He later played against both Arthur Priestley's side and Lord Hawke's team that both toured in 1896–97 and was also selected for the combined West Indies team against Priestley's XI scoring an impressive 75*, the highest score by either side, enabling the home side to win by 3 wickets. He scored an impressive 129 for Barbados against Trinidad in the 1897–98 Inter-Colonial Tournament.

He would certainly have played in the 1900 tour to England, probably as captain, but he was serving in South Africa, taking part in the Second Boer War. He joined the 20th Brigade, becoming a Major in the Royal Artillery, but fell ill and never saw service.

Returning to Barbados he played for the combined West Indies team in 1901–02 (scoring 68) and 1904–05 (scoring 83), as captain on both occasions.

He was selected for the 1906 West Indies touring side and then elected captain. Before the tour he was described as "an excellent bat and fine field, considered the best in the West Indies" and "a graceful bat with an especially good drive. He uses his weight to advantage, and although not too good a starter, he ought to make a lot of runs". In fact he was something of a disappointment on the tour, scoring 529 at an average of 21.16. He scored a useful 74 in the second match of the tour against Essex and later 68* against Scotland and 68 against Leicestershire.

'Cricket' later remarked that "once he retired, but cricket lured him back again; once he left the island for good, but Barbados called him back". Perhaps this explains why he did not play again after the 1906 tour until the 1908–09 season when he scored 53 and a rapid 81 in the final of the Inter-Colonial Tournament and then played a couple of matches in England in 1909. He continued playing for Barbados both before and after World War I, generally as captain.

He was the natural captain again for the 1923 tour to England. In the first class matches he scored 360 runs at an average of 25.71, including 51* against Cambridge University and 76 against Somerset. He missed a number of matches through illness, playing in just 11 of the 20 first class matches.

His final first class match was in a trial match for the 1928 tour to England at which time he was 50 years old.
