= George John (cricketer) =

West Indian cricketer

Personal information
- Born: c 1883; Saint Vincent
- Died: 14 January 1944; Port of Spain, Trinidad
- Batting: Right-handed
- Bowling: Right-arm fast-medium

Domestic team information
- Years: Team
- 1909/10–1927/28: Trinidad

Career statistics
Competition	First-class
Matches	29
Runs scored	466
Batting average	14.12
100s/50s	1/0
Top score	111
Balls bowled	5,801
Wickets	133
Bowling average	19.24
5 wickets in innings	7
10 wickets in match	1
Best bowling	7/52
Catches/stumpings	16/–
- Source: CricketArchive, 7 November 2022

George John (c. 1883 – 14 January 1944) was a West Indian fast bowler.

George John was a very fast bowler in his prime and could cut the ball into the batsmen. He toured England with West Indies side in 1923 but by then was past his best. He claimed 90 wickets at 14.68 in all matches, 49 of them at 19.51 in first class matches. Against Glamorgan he took 10 for 147 and at Scarborough, with George Francis, reduced a near Test quality HDG Leveson Gower's XI to 19 for 6 as they were chasing 28 to win in the second innings. John took 5 for 54 for Trinidad against MCC in 1925-26 when he was over forty years of age.

The Trinidadian writer C. L. R. James, who often played against him, has left a picture of what John the bowler looked like:

He was just the right height, about five foot ten, with a chest, shoulders and legs on him all power and proportion... He was one of those rare fast bowlers who proposed to defeat you first of all by pace and sheer pace. He ran about fifteen yards, a quick step or two first, a long loping stride that increased until near the crease he leapt into the air and delivered, his arm high ... Thunderbolts they were."

== Legacy ==
In June 1988, John was celebrated on the 30c Trinidad and Tobago stamp alongside the Barbados Cricket Buckle. He was the father of playwright and actor Errol John.
