= Snuffy Browne =

Barbadian cricketer

Personal information
- Full name: Cyril Rutherford Browne
- Born: 8 October 1890; Robert's Tenantry, St Michael, Barbados
- Died: 12 January 1964 (aged 73); Georgetown, Demerara, British Guiana
- Nickname: Snuffy
- Batting: Right-handed
- Bowling: Right-arm medium
- Relatives: C. A. Browne (brother)

International information
- National side: West Indies
- Test debut (cap 1): 23 June 1928 v England
- Last Test: 21 February 1930 v England

Domestic team information
- Years: Team
- 1921–1938: British Guiana
- 1909–1911: Barbados

Career statistics
Competition	Test	First-class
Matches	4	74
Runs scored	176	2077
Batting average	25.14	19.97
100s/50s	0/1	3/10
Top score	70*	103
Balls bowled	840	15732
Wickets	6	278
Bowling average	48.00	22.39
5 wickets in innings	0	17
10 wickets in match	0	6
Best bowling	2/72	8/58
Catches/stumpings	1/–	59/–
- Source: CricketArchive, 30 January 2010

Cyril Rutherford "Snuffy" Browne (8 October 1890 – 12 January 1964) was a Barbadian Test cricketer who was a member of the first West Indies Test cricket team, playing against England in 1928.

Browne was born in Robert's Tenantry, St Michael, Barbados. A right-arm medium pace bowler and right-handed batsman, he played first-class cricket for Barbados and British Guiana in a career that extended from 1909 to 1938. His best bowling figures were 5 for 77 and 8 for 58 for British Guiana against Barbados in 1925–26. His highest score was 103, scored in an hour, and the only century in the match, when the touring West Indians beat Kent in 1928.

He toured England in 1923, when no Tests were played, and again in 1928. He played two Tests on the 1928 tour and two at home when England visited the West Indies in 1929-30.

At one time he was a magistrate in British Guiana. He was the first West Indian to be elected an honorary life member of the Marylebone Cricket Club. He died in Georgetown, British Guiana, aged 73 years.
