= Karl Nunes =

Jamaican cricketer

- R. K. Nunes in 1928

Personal information
- Full name: Robert Karl Nunes
- Born: 7 June 1894; Kingston, Colony of Jamaica
- Died: 23 July 1958 (aged 64); London, England
- Batting: Left-handed
- Role: Wicket-keeper

International information
- National side: West Indies
- Test debut (cap 8): 23 June 1928 v England
- Last Test: 3 April 1930 v England

Domestic team information
- Years: Team
- 1924–1932: Jamaica

Career statistics
Competition	Test	First-class
Matches	4	61
Runs scored	245	2,695
Batting average	30.62	31.33
100s/50s	0/2	6/11
Top score	92	200*
Balls bowled	0	126
Wickets	–	3
Bowling average	–	27.66
5 wickets in innings	–	0
10 wickets in match	–	0
Best bowling	–	2/49
Catches/stumpings	2/0	31/8
- Source: CricketArchive, 10 January 2010

Robert Karl Nunes CBE (7 June 1894 – 23 July 1958) was a Jamaican cricketer of Portuguese descent who played in West Indies' first Test in their inaugural Test tour of England as wicketkeeper and captain.

Nunes was born in Kingston, Colony of Jamaica. He attended Wolmer's School then was educated in England at Dulwich College. He toured England with the 1923 West Indian side that won 12 matches; he was vice-captain and second-string wicketkeeper, and the tour was his first taste of first-class cricket.

In the mid-1920s, Nunes captained Jamaica in matches against Barbados, MCC and a touring side led by Lionel Tennyson. He scored two centuries against Tennyson's side, including his personal best of 200 not out. He was a leading light in the Jamaican cricket board of control from its establishment in 1926.

Having kept wicket only intermittently across his first-class career, Nunes was the main wicketkeeper on the 1928 tour in the absence of George Dewhurst, and he moved down the batting order from his customary position as an opener to bat mainly in middle order. He had limited success in the Tests, with a highest of just 37, and fared only a little better in other first-class matches, with a single century against Glamorgan.

After this tour, Nunes played only in Jamaica, though this also included an appearance in the Kingston Test match of the England tour of 1929–30. In this match, the final game of a four-Test series, Nunes was again captain but, freed from the responsibility of wicketkeeping, opened the innings. In a theoretically timeless Test that ended as a draw after eight days, England made 849, then the highest Test score, with 325 for Andrew Sandham. Nunes top-scored with 66 in the West Indies response of 286 and then made 92 in the second innings after England did not enforce the follow-on, putting on 227 for the second wicket with George Headley, who went on to make 223. This was Nunes's last Test appearance.

Nunes served as president of the West Indies Cricket Board of Control from 1945 to 1952, and president of the Jamaica Cricket Association from 1946 to 1958.

Nunes died in London at the age of 64. In June 1988 Nunes was commemorated on the $3 Jamaican stamp alongside the Barbados Cricket Buckle.

Preceded by none	West Indies Test cricket captains 1928	Succeeded by Teddy Hoad
Preceded by Maurice Fernandes	West Indies Test cricket captains 1929–30	Succeeded by Jackie Grant
