= Herman Griffith =

Trinidadian cricketer

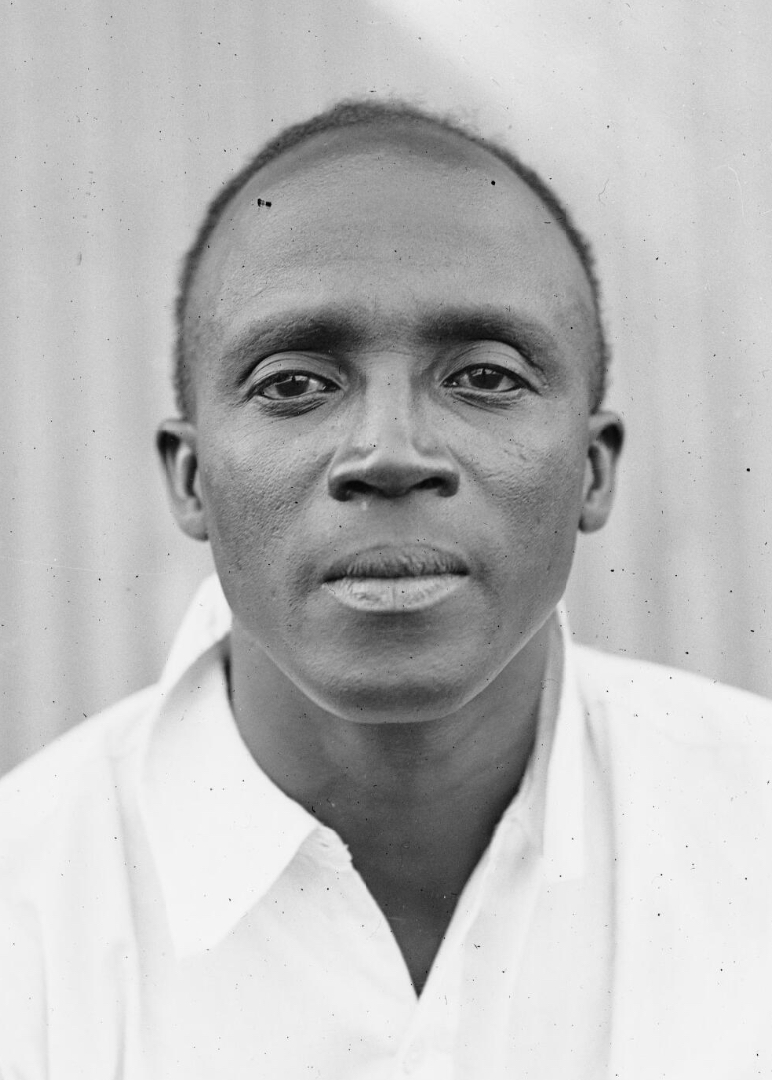
- Griffith in 1930

Personal information
- Full name: Herman Clarence Griffith
- Born: 1 December 1893; Arima, Trinidad and Tobago
- Died: 18 March 1980 (aged 86); Bridgetown, St. Michael, Barbados
- Batting: Right-handed
- Bowling: Right-arm fast

International information
- National side: West Indies
- Test debut (cap 6): 23 June 1928 v England
- Last Test: 12 August 1933 v England

Domestic team information
- Years: Team
- 1921–1941: Barbados

Career statistics
Competition	Test	First-class
Matches	13	79
Runs scored	91	1204
Batting average	5.05	15.05
100s/50s	0/0	0/4
Top score	18	84
Balls bowled	2663	14658
Wickets	44	258
Bowling average	28.25	28.27
5 wickets in innings	2	12
10 wickets in match	0	2
Best bowling	6/103	7/38
Catches/stumpings	4/–	36/–
- Source: CricketArchive, 8 February 2010

Herman Clarence Griffith (1 December 1893 – 18 March 1980) was a Trinidadian cricketer who played in West Indies' first Test match in their inaugural Test tour of England and was one of the leading bowlers on that tour.

Griffith was born in Arima, Trinidad and Tobago. His first tour was to England in 1928. He took 11 wickets in the three Tests, the most of any West Indian bowler. England only gave up 30 wickets in the three Tests, as they won each by an innings. Griffith's best bowling of the tour, and his best in Test cricket, came in the final match at The Oval when he took six for 103, at one stage taking five for 21 as England collapsed from 301 for two to 333 for seven.

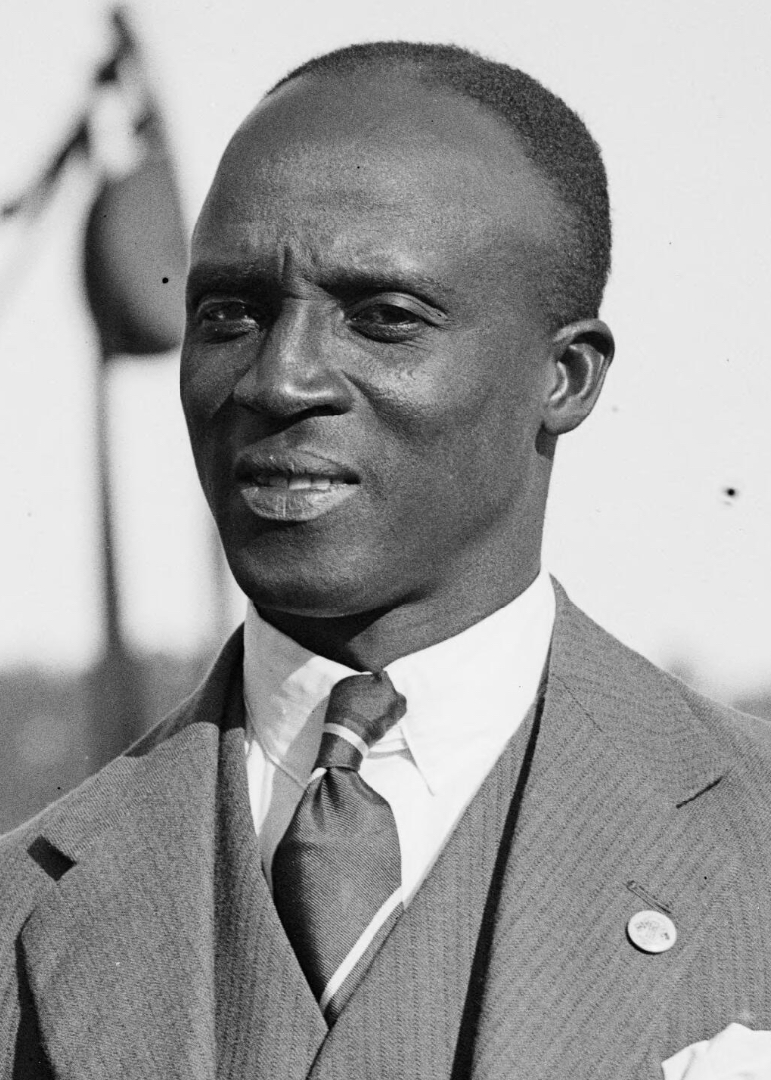
Griffith on the 1930–31 tour of Australia

On the tour as a whole, Griffith was less successful in first-class matches than Learie Constantine, but took 103 wickets in all matches to finish second in the tour bowling averages. He mostly batted at No. 10 or 11, but was a more than useful batsman, making more than 300 runs on the tour and sharing in several partnerships that rescued earlier batting collapses.

He was the first bowler in Test cricket to send Donald Bradman back to the pavilion with a duck. This occurred during the Fifth Test of West Indies' tour of Australia in 1931. This led to the Australians missing their target and the West Indies' first Test victory against Australia (and, in fact, their second overall).

He was part of the touring side in 1933 and took three Test wickets against England when just short of his fortieth birthday.

C. L. R. James was an admirer and once said of him:

Griffith had had a secondary education, called nobody mister except the captain, and had the reputation of being ready to call anybody anything which seemed to him to apply.

He died in Bridgetown, Barbados at the age of 86.

In June 1988 Griffith was celebrated on the Barbadian 50c stamp alongside the Barbados Cricket Buckle. In error 101 stamps were issued featuring a photograph of Barto Bartlett instead of Herman Griffith.
