= Barto Bartlett =

Barbadian cricketer (1906–1976)

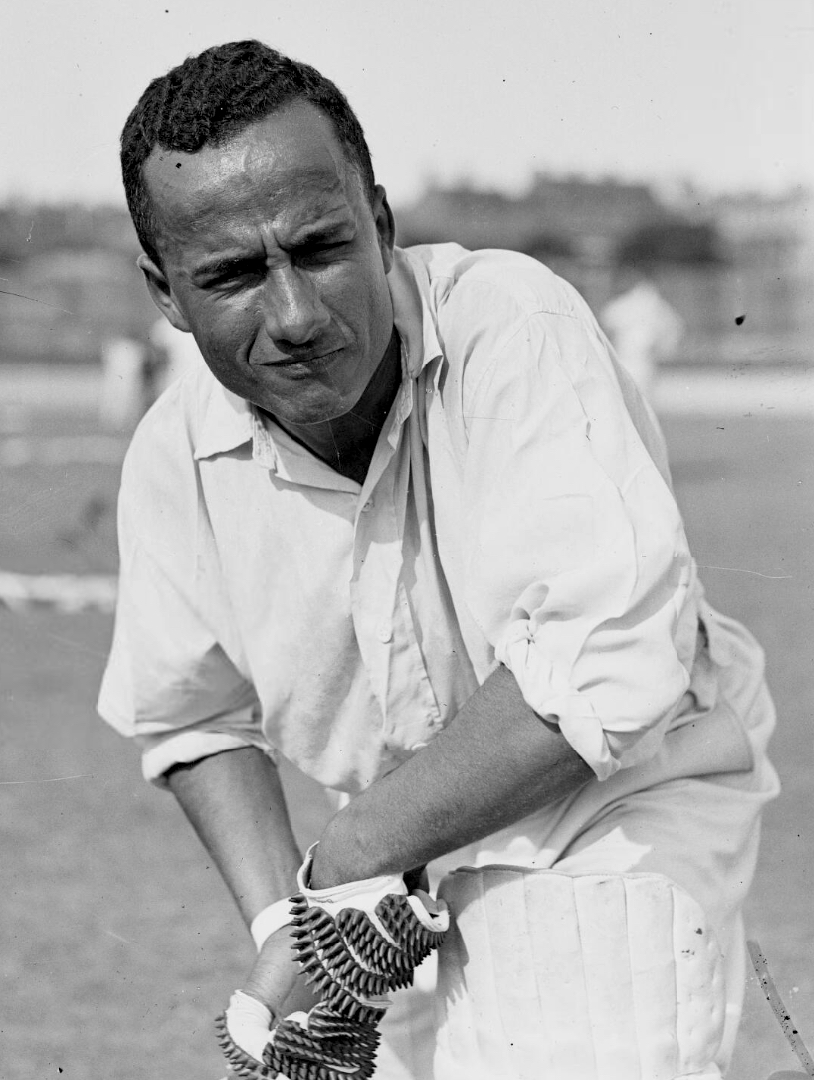
- Bartlett in 1930

Personal information
- Full name: Edward Lawson Bartlett
- Born: 10 March 1906; Flint Hall, Saint Michael, Barbados
- Died: 21 December 1976 (aged 70); Bayville, Saint Michael, Barbados
- Nickname: Barto
- Batting: Right-handed

International information
- National side: West Indies
- Test debut (cap 14): 11 August 1928 v England
- Last Test: 27 February 1931 v Australia

Domestic team information
- Years: Team
- 1923–1939: Barbados

Career statistics
Competition	Tests	First-class
Matches	5	42
Runs scored	131	1,581
Batting average	18.71	23.25
100s/50s	0/1	1/8
Top score	84	109
Catches/stumpings	2/–	8/–
- Source: Cricket Archive, 26 October 2010

Edward Lawson "Barto" Bartlett (March 10, 1906 – December 21, 1976) was a Barbadian cricketer who played in West Indies' inaugural Test tour of England in 1928.

He was born in Flint Hall, St. Michael, Barbados, and played first-class cricket as a batsman for Barbados from 1923–24 to 1938–39. His only first-class century was 109 against Nottinghamshire in 1928. His best Test score was 84 (in 119 minutes) against Australia in the First Test in 1930–31.

He died in St. Michael, Barbados, at the age of seventy. Wisden had erroneously reported his death in its 1934 edition. In his obituary in the 1978 edition, Wisden said of him that "he had strokes all round the wicket and, when he was making runs, his potentialities were obvious. It was sad that he could so seldom do justice to them." In his history of Barbados cricket, Bruce Hamilton said Bartlett was the "perfect stylist, fully equipped for batsmanship in the grand manner, with every quality except temperament".

In June 1988, 101 Barbadian 50c stamps were issued featuring the Barbados Cricket Buckle with a photograph of "Barto" Bartlett instead of Herman Griffith. These errors were issued through Parcel Post Office in Bridgetown. All other postal counters had their stocks recovered before 9 am on Monday 6 June 1988 and the corrected 50c stamps depicting Griffith were issued on 11 July 1988. The 101 stamps that were issued featuring Bartlett are highly collectable.
