= English cricket team in the West Indies in 1929–30 =

International cricket tour

The England national cricket team toured the West Indies from January to April 1930 and played a four-match Test series against the West Indies cricket team which was drawn 1–1. England were captained by Freddie Calthorpe; West Indies by a different captain at each venue. They were the first Tests played in the West Indies.

At the same time another English team, captained by Harold Gilligan, was touring New Zealand, playing New Zealand's first Test series. It was the only time one country has played in two Test matches on the same day.

== English team ==
- Freddie Calthorpe (captain)
- Les Ames
- Ewart Astill
- George Gunn
- Nigel Haig
- Patsy Hendren
- Jack O'Connor
- Fred Price
- Wilfred Rhodes
- Andy Sandham
- Rony Stanyforth
- Greville Stevens
- Leslie Townsend
- Bill Voce
- Bob Wyatt

The team was, by a wide margin, the oldest Test tour party of all time, with an average age of nearly 38 years. The manager was the veteran administrator Harry Mallett.

== Test match summary ==
=== First Test ===
11, 13, 14, 15, 16 January 1930
(5-day match)
Scorecard

West Indies	v	England
369 (114.1 overs); CA Roach 122; GTS Stevens 5/105 (27 overs)		467 (153 overs); A Sandham 152; LN Constantine 3/121 (39 overs)
384 (152.4 overs); GA Headley 176; GTS Stevens 5/90 (26.4 overs)		167/3 (65 overs); A Sandham 51; HC Griffith 2/37 (15 overs)

Match drawn
Kensington Oval, Bridgetown, Barbados
Umpires: W Badley (WIN) and J Hardstaff (ENG)

- West Indies won the toss and elected to bat.
- 12 January was taken as a rest day.
- GA Headley, FI de Caires, JED Sealy, LA Walcott, EL St Hill and EAC Hunte (all WIN), and FSG Calthorpe and W Voce (both ENG) made their Test debuts.

=== Second Test ===
1, 3, 4, 5, 6 February 1930
(5-day match)
Scorecard

England	v	West Indies
208 (72.1 overs); EH Hendren 77; HC Griffith 5/63 (22 overs)		254 (87.2 overs); EAC Hunte 58; WE Astill 4/58 (24.2 overs)
425/8d (125 overs); EH Hendren 205*; LN Constantine 4/165 (40 overs)		212 (112.2 overs); FI de Caires 45; W Voce 7/70 (37.2 overs)

England won by 167 runs
Queen's Park Oval, Port of Spain, Trinidad
Umpires: KL Grant (WIN) and J Hardstaff (ENG)

- England won the toss and elected to bat.
- 2 February was taken as a rest day.
- MG Grell, N Betancourt and EE Achong (all WIN) made their Test debuts.

=== Third Test ===
21, 22, 24, 25, 26 February 1930
(5-day match)
Scorecard

West Indies	v	England
471 (148 overs); CA Roach 209; LF Townsend 2/48 (16 overs)		145 (61.3 overs); EH Hendren 56; LN Constantine 4/35 (16.3 overs)
290 (127.3 overs); GA Headley 112; WE Astill 4/70 (43 overs)		327 (158.5 overs); EH Hendren 123; LN Constantine 5/87 (40 overs)

West Indies won by 289 runs
Bourda, Georgetown, British Guiana
Umpires: J Hardstaff (ENG) and RDR Hill (WIN)

- West Indies won the toss and elected to bat.
- 23 February was taken as a rest day.
- CEL Jones (WIN) and LF Townsend (ENG) made their Test debuts.
- This was the first test cricket victory for the West Indies.

=== Fourth Test ===
3, 4, 5, 7, 8, 9, 10, 11, 12 April 1930
(Timeless Test)
Scorecard

England	v	West Indies
849 (258.2 overs); A Sandham 325; OC Scott 5/266 (80.2 overs)		286 (111.5 overs); RK Nunes 66; NE Haig 3/73 (30 overs); WE Astill 3/73 (33 overs)
272/9d (79.1 overs); EH Hendren 55; OC Scott 4/108 (25 overs)		408/5 (164.3 overs); GA Headley 223; RES Wyatt 2/58 (24.3 overs)

Match drawn
Sabina Park, Kingston, Jamaica
Umpires: J Hardstaff (WIN) and E Knibbs (WIN)

- England won the toss and elected to bat.
- 6 April was taken as a rest day.
- There was no play on the eighth or ninth days.
- The match was drawn on the ninth day by arrangement, as the MCC boat home was leaving.
- CC Passailaigue, IM Barrow, OC Da Costa and GG Morais (all WIN) made their Test debuts.
