= List of West Indies Test wicket-keepers =

The wicket-keeper in the sport of cricket is the player on the fielding side who stands behind the wicket or stumps being guarded by the batsman currently on strike. The wicket-keeper is the only member of the fielding side permitted to wear gloves and external leg guards. The West Indies cricket team, who were granted Test status in 1928, have fielded numerous wicket-keepers. A chronological list of West Indian Test wicket-keepers is shown here. (Note: On occasions, another player may have stepped in to relieve the primary wicket-keeper due to injury or illness. Unless the relief player was himself a recognised Test wicket-keeper, he is not included here. Due to selection policy or fielding tactics, a named player might not have been keeping wicket when taking a particular catch, but these catches are nevertheless included in the career totals given.)

The following specialist keepers have filled the role for the West Indies in Test cricket since 1928, with Jeff Dujon's 272 dismissals from 81 Test matches making him the most prolific. Joshua Da Silva is the incumbent keeper. From Deryck Murray in 1963 onwards, most keepers have also kept wicket for the West Indies in at least one One-Day International.

No.	Player	Team	Span	Tests	Catches	Stumpings	Total dismissals
1	Karl Nunes	Jamaica	1928–1930 (Note: Nunes kept wicket only in his first three Tests, in 1928.)	4	2	0	2
2	Errol Hunte	Trinidad and Tobago	1930	3	5	0	5
3	Ivan Barrow	Jamaica	1930–1939	11	17	5	22
4	Cyril Christiani	British Guiana	1935	4	6	1	7
5	Derek Sealy	Barbados and Trinidad and Tobago	1930–1939 (Note: Sealy kept wicket only in his last two Tests, in 1939.)	11	6	1	7
6	Clyde Walcott	Barbados and British Guiana	1947–1960 (Note: Walcott kept wicket only in his first 15 Tests, from 1947 to 1951.)	44	53	11	64
7	Sammy Guillen	Trinidad and Tobago and Canterbury (Note: Guillen was one of 14 Test players to play Test cricket for two nations, in this case the West Indies and New Zealand. The statistics here show only his career for the West Indies, for his career in its entirety see CricInfo)	1951–1956	5	9	2	11
8	Alfred Binns	Jamaica	1953–1956	5	14	3	17
9	Ralph Legall	Trinidad and Tobago	1953	4	8	1	9
10	Clifford McWatt	British Guiana	1954–1955	6	8	1	9
11	Clairmonte Depeiaza	Barbados	1955–1956	5	7	4	11
12	Rohan Kanhai	Guyana, Trinidad and Tobago, Western Australia, Tasmania, Warwickshire	1957–1974 (Note: Kanhai kept wicket only in his first three Tests, in 1957.)	79	50	0	50
13	Gerry Alexander	Jamaica	1957–1961	25	85	5	90
14	Jackie Hendriks	Jamaica	1962–1969	20	42	5	47
15	Ivor Mendonca	Guyana	1962	2	8	2	10
16	David Allan	Barbados	1962–1966	5	15	3	18
17	Deryck Murray	Trinidad, Nottinghamshire and Warwickshire	1963–1980	62	181	8	189 (Note: This player also kept in at least one One Day International game for the West Indies)
18	Mike Findlay	Windward Islands	1969–1973	10	19	2	21
19	Desmond Lewis	Jamaica	1971	19	8	0	8
20	David Murray	Barbados	1978–1982	19	57	5	62
21	Jeff Dujon	Jamaica	1981–1991 (Note: Dujon did not keep wicket in two Tests in which he played solely as a batsman.)	81	267	5	272
22	Thelston Payne	Barbados	1986	1	5	0	5
23	David Williams	Trinidad and Tobago	1992–1998	11	40	2	42
24	Junior Murray	Windward Islands	1993–2002	33	99	3	102
25	Courtney Browne	Barbados	1995–2005	20	79	2	81
26	Ridley Jacobs	Antigua and Leeward Islands	1998–2004	65	207	12	219
27	Carlton Baugh	Jamaica	2003–2012	21	43	5	48
28	Denesh Ramdin	Trinidad and Tobago	2005–2016	74	205	12	217
29	Chadwick Walton	Combined Campuses and Colleges	2009	2	10	0	10
30	Shane Dowrich	Barbados	2016–2020	35	85	5	90
31	Shai Hope	Barbados	2016–2019	2	8	0	8
32	Jahmar Hamilton	Anguilla cricket team and the Leeward Islands cricket team	2019	1	5	0	5
33	Joshua Da Silva	Trinidad and Tobago	2020–present	5	13	0	18

== See also ==
- West Indies Test wicket-keepers
- List of West Indies Test cricketers
