= English cricket team in the West Indies in 1934–35 =

International cricket tour

The English cricket team in the West Indies in 1934–35 was a cricket touring party sent to the West Indies under the auspices of the Marylebone Cricket Club for a tour lasting 2 1/2 months in 1934–35. The team played four Test matches against the West Indian cricket team, winning one match but losing two – the first series defeat of an English side by the West Indies.

The team comprised 14 players, but less than half of them were regular Test players. It "could scarcely be regarded as representative of the full strength of England", Wisden Cricketers' Almanack reported in its 1936 edition coverage of the tour. By contrast, the West Indies side had developed since its disappointing tour of England in 1933. In Martindale, Constantine and Hylton it had a trio of high-class fast bowlers, and Jackie Grant was an experienced captain not given to the eccentricities that the England captain Wyatt inflicted on his team.

== The touring party ==
The team consisted of 14 players, including two wicketkeepers. The party was:

- Bob Wyatt, captain
- Errol Holmes, vice-captain
- Leslie Ames, wicketkeeper
- Ken Farnes
- Bill Farrimond, wicketkeeper
- Wally Hammond
- William Harbord
- Patsy Hendren
- Eric Hollies
- Jack Iddon
- Maurice Leyland
- George Paine
- Jim Smith
- David Townsend

Of the 14, only six had appeared in the Test matches against the Australians in the previous English cricket season. These six were Wyatt, Ames, Farnes, Hammond, Hendren and Leyland. Harbord had not played any first-class cricket in 1934 and only a dozen matches in the previous five years, Townsend did not play for a first-class county side, though he had had some success for Oxford University, and Farrimond was Lancashire's second-choice wicketkeeper, though he had played Test cricket in South Africa in 1930–31. In the event, Harbord and Farrimond played only four matches each on the tour.

== The West Indies team ==
The 1933 West Indies team in England lost two of the three Test matches by an innings, and won only five first-class matches across a hot and sunny summer. The tour was disappointing: "The team did not play as well as we in this country had been led to believe they would", wrote Wisden in a critical report. Exceptions to the criticism of the team included captain Jackie Grant, batsman George Headley, who had averaged 66 runs per innings in making 2320 first-class runs in the season, and fast bowler Manny Martindale, who took 103 wickets at less than 21 runs apiece.

The 1933 experience may have led the MCC to underestimate the West Indies side it would face in the Caribbean. In addition, the previous Test-playing tour to the West Indies in 1929–30 had seen a very unsettled home side, with each community selecting the team for its Test match and little continuity in the side.

By contrast, the 1934–35 West Indies side had a stable core of seven or eight players who played in all or most of the Tests. Grant remained as an experienced captain; Headley led the batting; Martindale was joined by a second fast bowler in Leslie Hylton and backed up by Learie Constantine, who had been available for only a few matches on the 1933 tour because of a Lancashire League commitment.

== The Test matches ==
The tour followed the itinerary of the previous Test-playing MCC tour in 1929–30, with four Tests arranged in the main cricket-playing territories in the West Indies: Barbados, Trinidad, British Guiana, and Jamaica. The Tests were each scheduled for four days.

=== First Test ===
8–10 January 1935
Scorecard

West Indies	v	England
102 (47 overs); GA Headley 44; K Farnes 4/40 (15 overs)		81/7d (29.3 overs); WR Hammond 43; LG Hylton 3/8 (7.3 overs)
51/6d (19 overs); LG Hylton 19; CIJ Smith 5/16 (8 overs)		75/6 (16.3 overs); WR Hammond 29*; EA Martindale 5/22 (8.3 overs)

England won by 4 wickets
Kensington Oval, Bridgetown, Barbados
Umpires: CW Reece (WIN) and EL Ward (WIN)

- England won the toss and elected to field.
- The match was scheduled for four days but completed in three.
- GM Carew, RS Grant, LG Hylton and CM Christiani (all WIN), and CIJ Smith, J Iddon, ERT Holmes, GAE Paine and WE Hollies (all ENG) made their Test debuts.

Rain was the principal factor in a low-scoring match on a treacherous surface. Wyatt put the West Indies in on a rain-affected pitch and Farnes took four wickets for 15 runs as half the side were out for 31. George Headley rallied the team with 44 before being run out, but Paine and Hollies finished the innings off. England in turn collapsed to 81 for five by the end of the first day. Overnight rain then saturated the wicket to such an extent that play could not resume until after tea on the second day, and then, after Leslie Hylton took two wickets in the first over, Wyatt declared 21 runs behind. West Indies captain Jackie Grant shuffled his batting order in the hope the pitch would ease, but three wickets fell for four runs before Hylton and Cyril Christiani played out time on the second day. A further overnight deluge made play impossible until 3.30 on the third day. West Indies then lost three more wickets in adding 18 runs and Grant declared, setting England just 73 to win. Wyatt also rejigged his batting order with the aim that his tail-enders might blunt the West Indies attack. The move did not work, but Hammond with an unbeaten 29 and Hendren with 20 saw England through to victory. Manny Martindale took five second innings wickets for 22 runs.

=== Second Test ===
24–28 January 1935
Scorecard

West Indies	v	England
302 (95 overs); JED Sealy 92; CIJ Smith 4/100 (26 overs)		258 (121 overs); ERT Holmes 85*; RS Grant 3/68 (28 overs)
280/6d (103 overs); GA Headley 93; GAE Paine 3/109 (42 overs)		107 (65.5 overs); DCH Townsend 36; LN Constantine 3/11 (14.5 overs)

West Indies won by 217 runs
Queen's Park Oval, Port of Spain, Trinidad
Umpires: V Guillen (WIN) and AJ Richardson (AUS)

- England won the toss and elected to field.
- 27 January was taken as a rest day
- DCH Townsend (ENG) made his Test debut.

Wyatt again won the toss and put the West Indies in, but innings of 92 from Derek Sealy and of 90 from Learie Constantine led to a respectable total. England lost their first five wickets for 23 runs to the West Indies fast bowlers. Hendren and Iddon put on 71, then Iddon and Holmes made 74 together, and Holmes, who made 85, put on 62 with Farrimond. West Indies' second innings was a determined effort with 93 from Headley and contributions from almost all the other batsmen. England were set 325 to win and Wyatt – in what Wisden termed an "amazing and inexplicable course" – all but reversed the batting order. Five wickets fell before tea on the last day and the innings was over with one ball of the day remaining with Leyland and Holmes the last pair.

=== Third Test ===
14–18 February 1935
Scorecard

England	v	West Indies
226 (113.2 overs); GAE Paine 49; LG Hylton 4/27 (13.2 overs)		184 (93 overs); GA Headley 53; WE Hollies 7/50 (26 overs)
160/6d (80 overs); RES Wyatt 71; LN Constantine 3/32 (26 overs)		104/5 (24 overs); JED Sealy 33; GAE Paine 2/28 (7 overs)

Match drawn
Bourda, Georgetown, British Guiana
Umpires: JG Blackman (WIN) and AJ Richardson (AUS)

- England won the toss and elected to bat.
- 17 February was taken as a rest day
- KL Wishart and JM Neblett (both WIN) made their Test debuts.

Wyatt won the toss again and batted after a start delayed by rain. Subdued batting, in which Paine, sent in as nightwatchman top-scored with 49, meant that the total only reached 198 by tea on the second day. An England collapse followed, but West Indies also batted slowly, with the exception of Headley. Hollies took seven wickets for 50 runs. England, with 71 from the captain, failed to force the pace in the second innings and the declaration left West Indies just two hours to make 203. When early wickets fell, the attempt was given up.

=== Fourth Test ===
14–18 March 1935
Scorecard

West Indies	v	England
535/7d (168 overs); GA Headley 270*; GAE Paine 5/168 (56 overs)		271 (99.2 overs); LEG Ames 126; LN Constantine 3/55 (23.2 overs)
		103 (f/o) (54 overs); WR Hammond 34; EA Martindale 4/28 (16 overs)

West Indies won by an innings and 161 runs
Sabina Park, Kingston, Jamaica
Umpires: SC Burke (WIN) and E Knibbs (WIN)

- West Indies won the toss and elected to bat.
- 17 March was taken as a rest day.
- GH Mudie and RL Fuller (both WIN) made their Test debuts.

West Indies set a record for their highest Test score against England and Headley's 270 not out was the highest individual score for the West Indies. Headley shared partnerships of 202 with Sealy for the third wicket and of 147 for the seventh wicket with Rolph Grant. When England batted, Martindale inflicted a compound fracture of the jaw on Wyatt and four other wickets fell for 26 runs. Ames, with 126, turned the innings around with Iddon, who made 54, but England followed on 264 behind. Against Martindale and Constantine, there was limited resistance and the match ended soon after lunch on the fourth day.

== Other matches ==
The MCC team played eight other first-class matches of three days' duration, two each against the four main cricketing territories, each set of two games preceding the Test match in the same venue. The touring side won only one of these games, the second match in British Guiana, but they were not beaten in any, though more than once they were close to defeat when the game ended.

- In the first match Barbados hit 382 with 92 from Derek Sealy and 69 from Teddy Hoad, both Test batsmen, and a late flourish with the bat from Test bowlers Herman Griffith and Manny Martindale. Hollies took five for 81 in 31.4 overs but no other MCC bowler commanded respect. England batted badly against slow-medium bowling and Ames top-scored with 26 out of 170. Barbados batted patchily too to reach 149 for seven before declaring, and MCC, with 50s from Wyatt and Hendren, were not in danger.
- The second Barbados match was dominated by an unbeaten 281 from Hammond, the highest innings of the tour, and a devastating last wicket partnership of 122, to which Smith contributed 83 with five sixes and nine fours in 45 minutes. MCC's 601 was some distance too far for Barbados, whose 177, with 68 from George Carew was followed by a short follow-on second innings before rain moved in.
- In the first Trinidad match the hosts failed to snatch victory by just 19 runs, though they also had only two wickets to lose. Hammond scored a second century, 116 and Ames made an unbeaten 60 and Smith a hard-hit 54 out of a ninth wicket partner of 80. Trinidad's Arthur Maynard, whose only first-class cricket was in these two warm-up matches, scored an unbeaten 200 as Trinidad headed MCC's 348 and declared at 371 for seven. The second highest score was 37 by Rolph Grant. MCC's second innings relied on Townsend (48) and Leyland (77 not out), and set Trinidad 177 to win in 23 overs.
- Trinidad were even closer to victory in the second drawn game. MCC needed 67 from Ames to reach 226 against four for 40 from Learie Constantine. Wyatt took five wickets for 10 runs and Trinidad were 42 for six, but later runs left by Constantine and his brother Eddie brought the island a small first innings lead. MCC were then bowled out for 103, five wickets falling to Ben Sealey's medium page, and Leyland hitting 59 of the runs. Trinidad needed 100 in 80 minutes and just failed while losing six wickets.
- The first match in British Guiana was drawn. Hollies took five for 29 as British Guiana were bowled out for 102. Hendren hit 148 and Iddon 68 as MCC totalled 421, but scores of 70 and more from three Guyanese batsmen, including the Test player Charles Jones, enabled the hosts to make 284 for two and save the game easily.
- MCC won the second match with British Guiana after one of Wyatt's unorthodox captaincy moves, for once, paid off. On a pitch damaged by rain, the home side declared at 188 for eight with Paine taking six wickets for 67 runs and both other dismissals coming from run outs. MCC lost five wickets for 41 runs in 10 overs (and one ball) and then Wyatt declared. Paine (four for 11), Wyatt (four for 18) and Smith then bowled the Guyanese team out for 57, 30 of which were made by former Test player Vibart Wight. Wyatt was out for a single, but Townsend, with 93, and Hammond with 106, shared an unbroken second wicket partnership of 204 to bring victory by nine wickets.
- The first Jamaica match was drawn. Ivan Barrow hit 108 and George Mudie 94 to take Jamaica to 305. MCC struggled against the fast bowling of Dickie Fuller in his first first-class match, but Hendren made 118 and Holmes 72 and the innings finished only 16 behind at 289. Jamaica made 146 for three before declaring and MCC played out time. In Jamaica's second innings MCC wicketkeeper Farrimond received a blow on the head and was unable to continue. Wyatt took over as wicketkeeper and stumped George Headley for 14 off the bowling of Leyland.
- The second Jamaican game also ended in a draw, but the hosts had the better of it. MCC scored 321 through 89 for Ames and 50s for Hendren and Iddon. Headley then made 127 and Barrow 59, but the game was swung Jamaica's way by an unbroken seventh wicket stand of 169 between Mudie and Fuller, with Fuller making 113, reaching a century in 130 minutes in his second first-class game. Jamaica declared at 452 for six, with four of the wickets taken by the former Glamorgan all-rounder Trevor Arnott, who was co-opted into the side for his first first-class game in almost four years to give Hammond a rest before the final Test. MCC saved the match easily, reaching 109 for three.
