= List of international cricketers from Guyana =

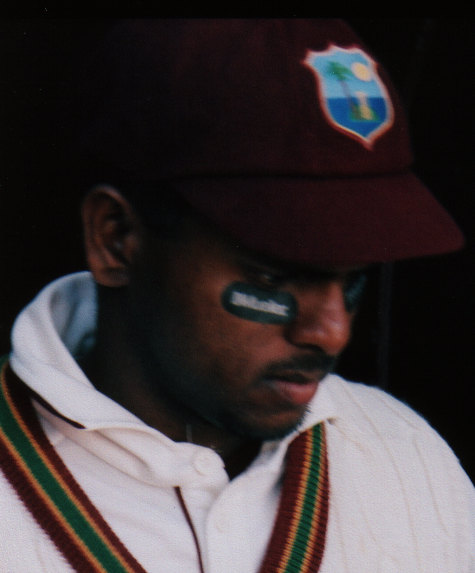
Shivnarine Chanderpaul—the leading Guyanese run scorer in Tests and ODIs.

Guyana (previously known as British Guiana) is a South American country that is culturally part of the Anglophone Caribbean and is one of the regions which make up the West Indies cricket team. It has produced international cricketers in all forms of the game—Tests, One Day Internationals (ODIs) and Twenty20 Internationals (T20Is). In 1928, against England, Maurice Fernandes became the first Guyanese player to represent the West Indies when he played in their inaugural Test match. In 1930 Fernandes became the first of seven Guyanese players to captain the West Indies. Clive Lloyd has captained the West Indies Test side a record 74 times.

Shivnarine Chanderpaul is the leading Guyanese run scorer in Tests and ODIs, having scored 11,867 runs in Tests and 8,778 in ODIs. With that being said, the only West Indian to have scored more than he did in tests is Brian Lara. Along with that the only West Indians to outscore him in one day internationals are Chris Gayle and Lara respectively. With 309 wickets, Lance Gibbs is the leading Guyanese wicket-taker in Tests. Colin Croft, Devendra Bishoo and Carl Hooper are the only other Guyanese players to have taken 100 Test wickets. With 193 wickets, Hooper has the most in ODIs than any other Guyanese player. Roger Harper is the only other Guyanese cricketer to take 100 ODI wickets.

== Key ==
- Apps denotes the number of appearances the player has made.
- Runs denotes the number of runs scored by the player.
- Wkts denotes the number of wickets taken by the player.

West Indies captains

Statistics correct as of: October 2022

Name	International career	Apps	Runs	Wkts	Apps	Runs	Wkts	Apps	Runs	Wkts	References
Name	International career	Tests			ODIs			T20Is			References
Maurice Fernandes	1928–1930	2	49	0	–	–	–	–	–	–	
Vibart Wight	1928–1930	2	67	0	–	–	–	–	–	–	
Frank de Caires	1930	3	232	0	–	–	–	–	–	–	
Charles Jones	1930–1935	4	63	0	–	–	–	–	–	–	
Cyril Christiani	1935	4	98	0	–	–	–	–	–	–	
Ken Wishart	1935	1	52	0	–	–	–	–	–	–	
Robert Christiani	1948–1954	22	896	3	–	–	–	–	–	–	
Berkeley Gaskin	1948	2	17	2	–	–	–	–	–	–	
John Trim	1948–1952	4	21	18	–	–	–	–	–	–	
Bruce Pairaudeau	1953–1957	13	454	0	–	–	–	–	–	–	
Leslie Wight	1953	1	21	0	–	–	–	–	–	–	
Clifford McWatt	1954–1955	6	202	1	–	–	–	–	–	–	
Glendon Gibbs	1955	1	12	0	–	–	–	–	–	–	
Rohan Kanhai	1957–1975	79	6,227	0	7	164	0	–	–	–	
Lance Gibbs	1958–1976	79	488	309	3	0	2	–	–	–	
Ivan Madray	1958	2	3	0	–	–	–	–	–	–	
Basil Butcher	1958–1969	44	3,104	5	–	–	–	–	–	–	
Joe Solomon	1958–1965	27	1,326	4	–	–	–	–	–	–	
Charlie Stayers	1962	4	58	9	–	–	–	–	–	–	
Ivor Mendonca	1962	2	81	0	–	–	–	–	–	–	
Clive Lloyd	1966–1985	110	7,515	10	87	1,977	8	–	–	–	
Steve Camacho	1968–1971	11	640	0	–	–	–	–	–	–	
Roy Fredericks	1968–1977	59	4,334	7	12	311	2	–	–	–	
Alvin Kallicharran	1972–1981	66	4,399	4	31	826	3	–	–	–	
Len Baichan	1975–1976	3	184	0	–	–	–	–	–	–	
Colin Croft	1977–1982	27	158	125	19	18	30	–	–	–	
Faoud Bacchus	1978–1983	19	782	0	29	612	0	–	–	–	
Sew Shivnarine	1978–1979	8	379	1	1	20	0	–	–	–	
Milton Pydanna	1980–1983	–	–	–	3	2	0	–	–	–	
Roger Harper	1983–1996	25	535	46	105	855	100	–	–	–	
Clyde Butts	1985–1988	7	108	10	–	–	–	–	–	–	
Carl Hooper	1987–2003	102	5,762	114	227	5,761	193	–	–	–	
Clayton Lambert^{[a]}	1990–2004	5	284	1	12	407	0	–	–	–	
Shivnarine Chanderpaul	1994–2015	164	11,867	9	268	8,778	14	22	343	0	
Barrington Browne	1994	–	–	–	4	8	2	–	–	–	
Neil McGarrell	1998–2001	4	61	17	17	60	15	–	–	–	
Reon King	1999–2005	19	66	53	50	65	76	–	–	–	
Keith Semple	1999	–	–	–	7	64	3	–	–	–	
Ramnaresh Sarwan	2000–2013	87	5,842	23	181	5,804	16	18	298	2	
Mahendra Nagamootoo	2000–2002	5	185	12	24	162	18	–	–	–	
Colin Stuart	2000–2001	6	24	20	5	3	8	–	–	–	
Narsingh Deonarine	2005–2015	18	725	24	31	682	6	8	55	0	
Ryan Ramdass	2005	1	26	0	1	1	0	–	–	–	
Sewnarine Chattergoon	2006–2009	4	127	0	18	370	1	–	–	–	
Leon Johnson	2008–2016	9	403	–	6	98	0	–	–	–	
Travis Dowlin	2009–2010	6	343	0	11	228	0	2	68	0	
Royston Crandon	2009	–	–	–	1	5	0	–	–	–	
Brandon Bess	2010	1	11	1	–	–	–	–	–	–	
Devendra Bishoo	2011–2019	36	707	117	42	164	38	7	17	7	
Christopher Barnwell	2011–2013	–	–	–	–	–	–	6	78	1	
Derwin Christian	2011	–	–	–	–	–	–	2	0	0	
Assad Fudadin	2012	3	122	0	–	–	–	–	–	–	
Veerasammy Permaul	2012–	9	145	31	7	19	8	1	–	–	
Shimron Hetmyer	2017–	16	838	0	47	1447	0	50	797	0	
Keemo Paul	2018–	3	129	10	23	266	25	23	187	25	
Vishaul Singh	2018	2	53	0	–	–	–	–	–	–	
Romario Shepherd	2018–	–	–	–	18	213	11	23	198	21	
Gudakesh Motie	2021–	1	23	0	4	15	8	23	198	21	

== See also ==
- List of West Indies Test cricketers
- List of West Indies ODI cricketers
- List of West Indies Twenty20 International cricketers

== Notes ==
- ^{a} Lambert played 1 ODI for the United States
