= Vivian Metcalfe =

Anglo-Irish cricketer

Personal information
- Full name: Vivian Alderson Metcalfe
- Born: 5 March 1906; Saltburn-by-the-Sea, Yorkshire, England
- Died: 28 December 1967 (aged 61); Addlestone, Surrey, England
- Batting: Right-handed

International information
- National side: Ireland

Domestic team information
- Years: Team
- 1936: Ireland
- 1928: Wales

Career statistics
Competition	First-class
Matches	4
Runs scored	81
Batting average	11.57
100s/50s	–/–
Top score	36
Balls bowled	–
Wickets	–
Bowling average	–
5 wickets in innings	–
10 wickets in match	–
Best bowling	–
Catches/stumpings	–/–
- Source: Cricinfo, 30 August 2011

Vivian Alderson Metcalfe (5 March 1906 – 28 December 1967) was an Anglo-Irish cricketer. Metcalfe was a right-handed batsman. He was born in Saltburn-by-the-Sea, Yorkshire.

Metcalfe made a single first-class appearance for Wales against the touring West Indians in 1928. In this match, he scored 18 runs in the Welsh first-innings before being dismissed by James Neblett, while in their second-innings he wasn't required to bat. He later made three first-class appearances for Ireland in 1936, playing against Scotland, the touring Indians and the Marylebone Cricket Club. In his three first-class appearances for Ireland, he scored 63 runs at an average of 10.50, with a high score of 36.

He died in Addlestone, Surrey on 28 December 1967.
