= Foffie Williams =

Barbadian cricketer (1914–1997)

Personal information
- Full name: Ernest Albert Vivian Williams
- Born: 10 April 1914; Bank Hall, St Michael, Barbados
- Died: 13 April 1997 (aged 83); Bridgetown, Barbados
- Nickname: Foffie
- Batting: Right-handed
- Bowling: Right-arm fast-medium

International information
- National side: West Indies
- Test debut (cap 50): 22 July 1939 v England
- Last Test: 3 March 1939 v England

Career statistics
Competition	Tests	First-class
Matches	4	42
Runs scored	113	1,479
Batting average	18.83	26.89
100s/50s	0/1	2/6
Top score	72	131*
Balls bowled	796	7,369
Wickets	9	116
Bowling average	26.77	29.19
5 wickets in innings	0	1
10 wickets in match	0	0
Best bowling	3/51	5/73
Catches/stumpings	2/0	18/0
- Source: Cricinfo, 12 July 2018

Ernest Albert Vivian "Foffie" Williams (10 April 1914, Bank Hall, St Michael, Barbados – 13 April 1997, Bridgetown, Barbados) was a West Indian cricketer who played in four Tests in 1939 and 1948.

In the second innings of the First Test at Bridgetown in 1948, Williams hit his first six balls to the boundary: 6, 6, 4, 4, 4, 4. He reached 50 in half an hour and finished with 72 in 63 minutes. His highest first-class score was 131 not out for Barbados against Trinidad in 1935–36, when he and Manny Martindale shared an eighth-wicket partnership of 255, which remains a West Indian first-class record; he also took three wickets in each innings, opening the bowling.

He became the chief sports officer in Barbados.
