= Arthur Maynard =

West Indian sportsperson (1909–1959)

Arthur Maynard (28 February 1909 – 16 November 1959) was a West Indian cricketer and footballer who played for Trinidad and Tobago national cricket team and for Trinidad and Tobago national football team. He was born in Trinidad. A right-hand batsman, he played two first-class matches against the touring Marylebone Cricket Club (MCC) side of 1934/35.

Between the first and second Tests the MCC played two three-day matches against Trinidad at the Queen's Park Oval. In the first of these Maynard made his first-class debut, opening the batting in Trinidad's first innings he scored 200 not out in a team total of 371/6 declared, his innings contained 30 boundaries and the score was just five short of the record at the ground. In Trinidad's second innings Maynard batted at number ten and scored 2 not out as the match was drawn.

In the second match Maynard scored 4 before he was dismissed by MCC captain Bob Wyatt. After dismissing the MCC for 103 Trinidad required 100 for victory but in 12 remaining overs they managed 86 so the match was drawn, Maynard didn't bat. This was Maynard's second and last first-class match, he therefore ended his career with a batting average of 206.

Maynard made two appearances, in 1933 and 1935, for North Trinidad against South Trinidad in the Beaumont Cup, however the competition wasn't awarded first-class status until 1959.

He played football as a full-back for the Trinidad and Tobago national team and Everton F.C. in Trinidad and Tobago.
