= George Mudie (cricketer) =

West Indian cricketer

Personal information
- Full name: George Horatio Mudie
- Born: 26 November 1915; Spanish Town, St Catherine, Jamaica
- Died: 8 June 2002 (aged 86); St Catherine, Jamaica
- Batting: Right-handed
- Bowling: Slow left-arm orthodox

International information
- National side: West Indies
- Only Test (cap 44): 14 March 1935 v England

Domestic team information
- Years: Team
- 1931/32–1951/52: Jamaica

Career statistics
Competition	Test	FC
Matches	1	19
Runs scored	5	574
Batting average	5.00	22.23
100s/50s	0/0	0/4
Top score	5	94
Balls bowled	174	3,815
Wickets	3	42
Bowling average	13.33	35.45
5 wickets in innings	0	2
10 wickets in match	0	0
Best bowling	2/23	5/32
Catches/stumpings	0/–	11/–
- Source: Cricinfo, 30 October 2022

George Horatio Mudie (26 November 1915 – 8 June 2002) was a West Indian international cricketer from Jamaica who played in one Test in 1934–35.

Mudie, a slow left-arm orthodox spin bowler and lower-order batsman, made his first-class debut in February 1932, aged 16, against Lord Tennyson's XI, an English team that was making a short tour of Jamaica. When the English Test team toured in 1934–35, Mudie made 94 and 60 not out for Jamaica in the two matches before the fourth and final Test of the series, and he was selected to play in the Test at Kingston. He was not successful with the bat, but he took three wickets (match figures of 29–12–40–3) in the victory that won the series for West Indies.

Mudie continued to play for Jamaica, his first-class career eventually comprising 19 matches in 20 years. His best first-class bowling figures were 5 for 32 against a touring Oxford and Cambridge Universities team in August 1938.

For most of his life, Mudie was referred to by cricket historians as "Moodie". At the time of his death aged 86 in Jamaica in June 2002, Mudie was the West Indies' oldest living Test cricketer.
