= Edward Ward (umpire) =

West Indian cricket umpire (1896–1966)

Personal information
- Full name: Edward Louis Ward
- Born: 11 July 1896; Saint John, Barbados
- Died: 10 August 1966 (aged 70); Saint Michael, Barbados

Umpiring information
- Tests umpired: 1 (1935)
- Source: Cricinfo, 17 July 2013

Edward Ward (11 July 1896 – 10 August 1966) was a Barbadian cricket umpire. He stood in one Test match, West Indies vs. England, in 1935. He also played in one first-class cricket match for Barbados in 1928/29.

== See also ==
- List of Test cricket umpires
- English cricket team in West Indies in 1934–35
