= Chadwick Walton =

West Indian cricketer (born 1985)

Personal information
- Full name: Chadwick Antonio Kirkpatrick Walton
- Born: 3 July 1985 (age 41); Kingston, Jamaica
- Nickname: Rope
- Batting: Right-handed
- Role: Top-order batter

International information
- National side: West Indies (2009-2018)
- Test debut (cap 280): 9 July 2009 v Bangladesh
- Last Test: 17 July 2009 v Bangladesh
- ODI debut (cap 153): 23 September 2009 v Pakistan
- Last ODI: 26 December 2017 v New Zealand
- T20I debut (cap 60): 11 January 2014 v New Zealand
- Last T20I: 5 August 2018 v Bangladesh

Domestic team information
- Years: Team
- 2007/08–2015/16: Combined Campuses and Colleges
- 2010/11–2018/19: Jamaica
- 2013–2016: Jamaica Tallawahs
- 2017–2018: Guyana Amazon Warriors (squad no. 59)
- 2017: Khulna Titans
- 2018–2019: Islamabad United (squad no. 59)
- 2019–present: Jamaica Tallawahs
- 2019/20, 2022: Chattogram Challengers
- 2020–present: Karachi Kings
- 2020: Galle Gladiators
- 2024: Karnali Yaks

Career statistics
Competition	Test	FC	LA	T20
Matches	2	87	90	175
Runs scored	13	3,879	1,978	3,300
Batting average	3.25	27.51	25.68	22.29
100s/50s	0/0	5/22	4/7	0/13
Top score	10	125	169	99*
Balls bowled	–	162	–	–
Wickets	–	4	–	–
Bowling average	–	21.25	–	–
5 wickets in innings	–	0	–	–
10 wickets in match	–	0	–	–
Best bowling	–	2/10	–	–
Catches/stumpings	10/–	223/25	110/10	96/16
- Source: ESPNcricinfo, 8 October 2021

Chadwick Antonio Kirkpatrick Walton (born 3 July 1985) is a West Indies cricketer from Jamaica. Nicknamed Rope, Walton is a right-hand batsman and wicket keeper who played a series of first class cricket matches for Combined Campuses and Colleges and University of West Indies Vice-Chancellor's XI before being chosen for the West Indies Test side. He played his first match against Bangladesh on 9 July 2009. During his first Test series, he equalled Ridley Jacobs's record of five dismissals in an innings. Walton was picked by Karachi Kings for Season 5 of Pakistan Super League.

Despite being tidy behind the stumps, Walton's batting has been a serious concern. He has made 2 ducks in 2 One Day International innings and has only managed 10 runs in 4 Test innings.

Following the West Indies A-team tour of India, Walton was named in the 15-member Test squad for the upcoming West Indies' tour of India 4 October 2013. He made his return to international cricket after Marlon Samuels was ruled out of the limited-overs series in New Zealand due to a chronic wrist injury. He was unable to capitalize in the course of the series in which he managed only 17 runs in the three matches that he played. Known regionally as a powerful striker, his T20I debut was also fruitless where he managed 9 runs in the two T20Is played at Eden Park and Wellington Regional Stadium (commercially known as Westpac Stadium).

In February 2017, he scored his first century in List A cricket, when he made 117 in the semi-final of the 2016–17 Regional Super50 tournament. He followed this up with his second List A century less than two weeks later, against the touring England team. In the 2017 CPL Draft, he was selected by the Guyana Amazon Warriors with a $110,000 contract.

On 3 June 2018, he was selected to play for the Vancouver Knights in the players' draft for the inaugural edition of the Global T20 Canada tournament. Later the same month, he was named the Best Regional T20 Cricketer of the Year at the annual Cricket West Indies' Awards.

In June 2019, he was selected to play for the Vancouver Knights franchise team in the 2019 Global T20 Canada tournament. In July 2020, he was named in the Jamaica Tallawahs squad for the 2020 Caribbean Premier League.

== See also ==
List of West Indies Test wicket-keepers
