= Courtenay Reece =

Barbadian cricketer and cricket umpire

Personal information
- Full name: Courtenay Walton Reece
- Born: 4 December 1899; Saint Thomas, Barbados
- Died: 16 April 1984 (aged 84); Hong Kong
- Batting: Right-handed
- Role: bowler

Umpiring information
- Tests umpired: 1 (1935)
- Source: Cricinfo, 15 July 2013

Courtenay Reece (4 December 1899 – 16 April 1984) was a Barbadian first-class cricketer and cricket umpire. He batted right-handed and was a medium pace bowler who played for Barbados and Oxford University between 1925 and 1930. He stood as umpire in one Test match, West Indies vs. England, in 1935.

== See also ==
- List of Test cricket umpires
- English cricket team in West Indies in 1934–35
