= George Gladstone =

West Indian cricketer

Cricket information
- Batting: Left-handed
- Bowling: Slow left-arm orthodox

International information
- National side: West Indies
- Only Test (cap 28): 3 April 1930 v England

Career statistics
Competition	Test	First-class
Matches	1	2
Runs scored	12	26
Batting average	–	–
100s/50s	0/0	0/0
Top score	12*	14*
Balls bowled	300	753
Wickets	1	10
Bowling average	189.00	44.10
5 wickets in innings	0	1
10 wickets in match	0	0
Best bowling	1/139	6/142
Catches/stumpings	0/–	1/–
- Source: CricInfo, 10 September 2022

George Gladstone, also known as George Gladstone Marais, (14 January 1901 – 19 May 1978) was a West Indian cricketer who played in one Test match in 1930.
