= List of West Indies Test cricketers =

This is a list of West Indian Test cricketers. A Test match is an international cricket match between two of the leading cricketing nations. The list is arranged in the order in which each player won his Test cap. Those players who won their first Test cap in the same Test match as other players who had such a win, are listed alphabetically by surname.

== Players ==
Statistics are correct as of 9 November 2026.

‡ Captain † Wicketkeeper

West Indian Test cricketers					Batting					Bowling						Fielding	
Cap	Name	First Test	Last Test	Mat	Inn	NO	Runs	HS	Avg	Balls	Mdn	Runs	Wkt	Best	Avg	Ct	St
1	Snuffy Browne	1928	1930	4	8	1	176	70*	25.14	840	38	288	6	2/72	48.00	1	-
2	George Challenor	1928	1928	3	6	0	101	46	16.83	-	-	-	-	-	-	0	-
3	Learie Constantine	1928	1939	18	33	0	635	90	19.24	3583	125	1746	58	5/75	30.10	28	-
4	Maurice Fernandes ‡	1928	1930	2	4	0	49	22	12.25	-	-	-	-	-	-	0	-
5	George Francis	1928	1933	10	18	4	81	19*	5.78	1619	54	763	23	4/40	33.17	7	-
6	Herman Griffith	1928	1933	13	23	5	91	18	5.05	2663	89	1243	44	6/103	28.25	4	-
7	Frank Martin	1928	1931	9	18	1	486	123*	28.58	1346	27	619	8	3/91	77.37	2	-
8	Karl Nunes ‡†	1928	1930	4	8	0	245	92	30.62	-	-	-	-	-	-	2	0
9	Clifford Roach	1928	1935	16	32	1	952	209	30.70	222	5	103	2	1/18	51.50	5	-
10	Wilton St Hill	1928	1930	3	6	0	117	38	19.50	12	0	9	0	-	-	1	-
11	Joe Small	1928	1930	3	6	0	79	52	13.16	366	11	184	3	2/67	61.33	3	-
12	Teddy Hoad ‡	1928	1933	4	8	0	98	36	12.25	-	-	-	-	-	-	1	-
13	Tommy Scott	1928	1931	8	13	3	171	35	17.10	1405	18	925	22	5/266	42.04	0	-
14	Barto Bartlett	1928	1931	5	8	1	131	84	18.71	-	-	-	-	-	-	2	-
15	Vibart Wight	1928	1930	2	4	1	67	23	22.33	30	1	6	0	-	-	0	-
16	Frank de Caires	1930	1930	3	6	0	232	80	38.66	12	0	9	0	-	-	1	-
17	George Headley ‡	1930	1954	22	40	4	2190	270*	60.83	398	7	230	0	-	-	14	-
18	Errol Hunte †	1930	1930	3	6	1	166	58	33.20	-	-	-	-	-	-	5	0
19	Edwin St Hill	1930	1930	2	4	0	18	12	4.50	558	29	221	3	2/110	73.66	0	-
20	Derek Sealy †	1930	1939	11	19	2	478	92	28.11	156	4	94	3	2/7	31.33	6	1
21	Leslie Walcott	1930	1930	1	2	1	40	24	40.00	48	1	32	1	1/17	32.00	0	-
22	Ellis Achong	1930	1935	6	11	1	81	22	8.10	918	34	378	8	2/64	47.25	6	-
23	Nelson Betancourt ‡	1930	1930	1	2	0	52	39	26.00	-	-	-	-	-	-	0	-
24	Mervyn Grell	1930	1930	1	2	0	34	21	17.00	30	1	17	0	-	-	1	-
25	Charles Jones	1930	1935	4	7	0	63	19	9.00	102	11	11	0	-	-	3	-
26	Ivan Barrow †	1930	1939	11	19	2	276	105	16.24	-	-	-	-	-	-	17	5
27	Oscar Da Costa	1930	1935	5	9	1	153	39	19.13	372	13	175	3	1/14	58.33	5	-
28	George Gladstone	1930	1930	1	1	1	12	12*	-	300	5	189	1	1/139	189.00	0	-
29	Clarence Passailaigue	1930	1930	1	2	1	46	44	46.00	12	0	15	0	-	-	3	-
30	Lionel Birkett	1930	1931	4	8	0	136	64	17.00	126	1	71	1	1/16	71.00	4	-
31	Jackie Grant ‡	1930	1935	12	22	6	413	71*	25.81	24	0	18	0	-	-	10	-
32	Manny Martindale	1933	1939	10	14	3	58	22	5.27	1605	40	804	37	5/22	21.73	5	-
33	Cyril Merry	1933	1933	2	4	0	34	13	8.50	-	-	-	-	-	-	1	-
34	Vincent Valentine	1933	1933	2	4	1	35	19*	11.67	288	14	104	1	1/55	104.00	0	-
35	Archie Wiles	1933	1933	1	2	0	2	2	1.00	-	-	-	-	-	-	0	-
36	Ben Sealey	1933	1933	1	2	0	41	29	20.50	30	1	10	1	1/10	10.00	0	-
37	George Carew	1935	1949	4	7	1	170	107	28.33	18	2	2	0	-	-	1	-
38	Cyril Christiani †	1935	1935	4	7	2	98	32*	19.60	-	-	-	-	-	-	6	1
39	Rolph Grant ‡	1935	1939	7	11	1	220	77	22.00	986	32	353	11	3/68	32.09	13	-
40	Leslie Hylton	1935	1939	6	8	2	70	19	11.67	965	31	418	16	4/27	26.13	1	-
41	James Neblett	1935	1935	1	2	1	16	11*	16.00	216	11	75	1	1/44	75.00	0	-
42	Kenneth Wishart	1935	1935	1	2	0	52	52	26.00	-	-	-	-	-	-	0	-
43	Dickie Fuller	1935	1935	1	1	0	1	1	1.00	48	2	12	-	-	-	0	-
44	George Mudie	1935	1935	1	1	0	5	5	5.00	174	12	40	3	2/23	13.33	0	-
45	John Cameron	1939	1939	2	3	0	6	5	2.00	232	6	88	3	3/66	29.33	0	-
46	Bertie Clarke	1939	1939	3	4	1	3	2	1.00	456	2	261	6	3/59	43.50	0	-
47	Jeff Stollmeyer ‡	1939	1955	32	56	5	2159	160	42.33	990	30	507	13	3/32	39.00	20	-
48	Ken Weekes	1939	1939	2	3	0	173	137	57.67	-	-	-	-	-	-	0	-
49	Gerry Gomez ‡	1939	1954	29	46	5	1243	101	30.32	5236	289	1590	58	7/55	27.41	18	-
50	Foffie Williams	1939	1948	4	6	0	113	72	18.83	796	46	241	9	3/51	26.78	2	-
51	Tyrell Johnson	1939	1939	1	1	1	9	9*	-	240	3	129	3	2/53	43.00	1	-
52	Vic Stollmeyer	1939	1939	1	1	0	96	96	96.00	-	-	-	-	-	-	0	-
53	Robert Christiani †	1948	1954	22	37	3	896	107	26.35	234	1	108	3	3/52	36.00	19	2
54	Wilfred Ferguson	1948	1954	8	10	3	200	75	28.57	2568	83	1165	34	6/92	34.26	11	-
55	Berkeley Gaskin	1948	1948	2	3	0	17	10	5.67	474	24	158	2	1/15	79.00	1	-
56	John Goddard ‡	1948	1957	27	39	11	859	83*	30.68	2931	148	1050	33	5/31	31.82	22	-
57	Prior Jones	1948	1951	9	11	2	47	10*	5.22	1842	64	751	25	5/85	30.04	4	-
58	Clyde Walcott †	1948	1960	44	74	7	3798	220	56.69	1194	72	408	11	3/50	37.09	53	11
59	Everton Weekes	1948	1958	48	81	5	4455	207	58.62	122	3	77	1	1/8	77.00	49	-
60	Andy Ganteaume	1948	1948	1	1	0	112	112	112.00	-	-	-	-	-	-	0	-
61	Frank Worrell ‡	1948	1963	51	87	9	3860	261	49.49	7141	274	2672	69	7/70	38.72	43	-
62	Lance Pierre	1948	1948	1	0	-	0	-	-	42	0	28	0	-	-	0	-
63	John Trim	1948	1952	4	5	1	21	12	5.25	794	28	291	18	5/34	16.17	2	-
64	Hines Johnson	1948	1950	3	4	0	38	22	9.50	789	37	238	13	5/41	18.31	0	-
65	Esmond Kentish	1948	1954	2	2	1	1	1*	1.00	540	31	178	8	5/49	22.25	1	-
66	Ken Rickards	1948	1952	2	3	0	104	67	34.67	-	-	-	-	-	-	0	-
67	Denis Atkinson ‡	1948	1958	22	35	6	922	219	31.79	5201	311	1647	47	7/53	35.04	11	-
68	Jimmy Cameron	1948	1949	5	7	1	151	75*	25.17	786	34	278	3	2/74	92.67	0	-
69	Allan Rae	1948	1953	15	24	2	1016	109	46.18	-	-	-	-	-	-	10	-
70	Sonny Ramadhin	1950	1961	43	58	14	361	44	8.20	13939	813	4579	158	7/49	28.98	9	-
71	Alf Valentine	1950	1962	36	51	21	141	14	4.70	12953	789	4215	139	8/104	30.32	13	-
72	Roy Marshall	1951	1952	4	7	0	143	30	20.43	52	2	15	0	-	-	1	-
73	Sammy Guillen †	1951	1952	5 (Note: Sammy Guillen also played Test cricket for New Zealand. Only his record for the West Indies is given here.)	6	2	104	54	26.00	-	-	-	-	-	-	13	3
74	Alfred Binns †	1953	1956	5	8	1	64	27	9.14	-	-	-	-	-	-	14	3
75	Frank King	1953	1956	14	17	3	116	21	8.29	2869	140	1159	29	5/74	39.97	5	-
76	Bruce Pairaudeau	1953	1957	13	21	0	454	115	21.62	6	0	3	0	-	-	6	-
77	Ralph Legall †	1953	1953	4	5	0	50	23	10.00	-	-	-	-	-	-	8	1
78	Roy Miller	1953	1953	1	1	0	23	23	23.00	96	8	28	0	-	-	0	-
79	Leslie Wight	1953	1953	1	1	0	21	21	21.00	-	-	-	-	-	-	0	-
80	Alfred Scott	1953	1953	1	1	0	5	5	5.00	264	9	140	0	-	-	0	-
81	Michael Frederick	1954	1954	1	2	0	30	30	15.00	-	-	-	-	-	-	0	-
82	John Holt	1954	1959	17	31	2	1066	166	36.76	30	2	20	1	1/20	20.00	8	-
83	Cliff McWatt †	1954	1955	6	9	2	202	54	28.86	24	2	16	1	1/16	16.00	9	1
84	Garfield Sobers ‡	1954	1974	93	160	21	8032	365*	57.78	21599	974	7999	235	6/73	34.04	109	-
85	Glendon Gibbs	1955	1955	1	2	0	12	12	6.00	24	1	7	0	-	-	1	-
86	Collie Smith	1955	1959	26	42	0	1331	168	31.69	4431	229	1625	48	5/90	33.85	9	-
87	Lennox Butler	1955	1955	1	1	0	16	16	16.00	240	7	151	2	2/151	75.50	0	-
88	Clairmonte Depeiaza †	1955	1956	5	8	2	187	122	31.17	30	0	15	0	-	-	7	4
89	Norman Marshall	1955	1955	1	2	0	8	8	4.00	279	22	62	2	1/22	31.00	0	-
90	Tom Dewdney	1955	1958	9	12	5	17	5*	2.43	1641	65	807	21	5/21	38.43	0	-
91	Hammond Furlonge	1955	1956	3	5	0	99	64	19.80	-	-	-	-	-	-	0	-
92	Alphonso Roberts	1956	1956	1	2	0	28	28	14.00	-	-	-	-	-	-	0	-
93	Roy Gilchrist	1957	1959	13	14	3	60	12	5.45	3227	124	1521	57	6/55	26.68	4	-
94	Rohan Kanhai ‡†	1957	1974	79	137	6	6227	256	47.53	183	8	85	0	-	-	50	0
95	Nyron Asgarali	1957	1957	2	4	0	62	29	15.50	-	-	-	-	-	-	0	-
96	Gerry Alexander ‡†	1957	1961	25	38	6	961	108	30.03	-	-	-	-	-	-	85	5
97	Eric Atkinson	1958	1959	8	9	1	126	37	15.75	1634	77	589	25	5/42	23.56	2	-
98	Conrad Hunte	1958	1967	44	78	6	3245	260	45.07	270	11	110	2	1/17	55.00	16	-
99	Lance Gibbs	1958	1976	79	109	39	488	25	6.97	27115	1313	8989	309	8/38	29.09	52	-
100	Easton McMorris	1958	1966	13	21	0	564	125	26.86	-	-	-	-	-	-	5	-
101	Ivan Madray	1958	1958	2	3	0	3	2	1.00	210	6	108	0	-	-	2	-
102	Jaswick Taylor	1958	1959	3	5	3	4	4*	2.00	672	33	273	10	5/109	27.30	0	-
103	Basil Butcher	1958	1969	44	78	6	3104	209*	43.11	256	15	90	5	5/34	18.00	15	-
104	Wes Hall	1958	1969	48	66	14	818	50*	15.73	10421	312	5066	192	7/69	26.39	11	-
105	Joe Solomon	1958	1965	27	46	7	1326	100*	34.00	702	39	268	4	1/20	67.00	13	-
106	Robin Bynoe	1959	1967	4	6	0	111	48	18.50	30	4	5	1	1/5	5.00	4	-
107	Reginald Scarlett	1960	1960	3	4	1	54	29*	18.00	804	53	209	2	1/46	104.50	2	-
108	Chester Watson	1960	1962	7	6	1	12	5	2.40	1458	47	724	19	4/62	38.11	1	-
109	Charran Singh	1960	1960	2	3	0	11	11	3.67	506	35	166	5	2/28	33.20	2	-
110	Seymour Nurse	1960	1969	29	54	1	2523	258	47.60	42	4	7	0	-	-	21	-
111	Charlie Griffith	1960	1969	28	42	10	530	54	16.56	5631	177	2683	94	6/36	28.54	16	-
112	Peter Lashley	1960	1966	4	7	0	159	49	22.71	18	2	1	1	1/1	1.00	4	-
113	Cammie Smith †	1960	1962	5	10	1	222	55	24.67	-	-	-	-	-	-	4	1
114	John Hendriks †	1962	1969	20	32	8	447	64	18.63	-	-	-	-	-	-	42	5
115	Charlie Stayers	1962	1962	4	4	1	58	35*	19.33	636	20	364	9	3/65	40.44	0	-
116	Ivor Mendonca †	1962	1962	2	2	0	81	78	40.50	-	-	-	-	-	-	8	2
117	Willie Rodriguez	1962	1968	5	7	0	96	50	13.71	573	10	374	7	3/51	53.43	3	-
118	David Allan †	1962	1966	5	7	1	75	40*	12.50	-	-	-	-	-	-	15	3
119	Lester King	1962	1968	2	4	0	41	20	10.25	476	19	154	9	5/46	17.11	2	-
120	Joey Carew	1963	1972	19	36	3	1127	109	34.15	1174	46	437	8	1/11	54.63	13	-
121	Deryck Murray ‡†	1963	1980	62	96	9	1993	91	22.91	-	-	-	-	-	-	181	8
122	Tony White	1965	1965	2	4	1	71	57*	23.67	491	27	152	3	2/34	50.67	1	-
123	Bryan Davis	1965	1965	4	8	0	245	68	30.63	-	-	-	-	-	-	1	-
124	David Holford	1966	1977	24	39	5	768	105*	22.59	4816	164	2009	51	5/23	39.39	18	-
125	Clive Lloyd ‡	1966	1985	110	175	14	7515	242*	46.68	1716	75	622	10	2/13	62.20	90	-
126	Steve Camacho	1968	1971	11	22	0	640	87	29.09	18	1	12	0	-	-	4	-
127	Charlie Davis	1968	1973	15	29	5	1301	183	54.21	894	32	330	2	1/27	165.00	4	-
128	Prof Edwards	1968	1969	5	8	1	65	22	9.29	1311	25	626	18	5/84	34.78	0	-
129	Roy Fredericks	1968	1977	59	109	7	4334	169	42.49	1187	41	548	7	1/12	78.29	62	-
130	Maurice Foster	1969	1978	14	24	5	580	125	30.53	1776	106	600	9	2/41	66.67	3	-
131	Vanburn Holder	1969	1979	40	59	11	682	42	14.21	9095	367	3627	109	6/28	33.28	16	-
132	John Shepherd	1969	1971	5	8	0	77	32	9.63	1445	70	479	19	5/104	25.21	4	-
133	Mike Findlay †	1969	1973	10	16	3	212	44*	16.31	-	-	-	-	-	-	19	2
134	Grayson Shillingford	1969	1972	7	8	1	57	25	8.14	1181	38	537	15	3/63	35.80	2	-
135	Arthur Barrett	1971	1975	6	7	1	40	19	6.67	1612	83	603	13	3/43	46.38	0	-
136	Jack Noreiga	1971	1971	4	5	2	11	9	3.67	1322	47	493	17	9/95	29.00	2	-
137	Keith Boyce	1971	1976	21	30	3	657	95*	24.33	3501	99	1801	60	6/77	30.02	5	-
138	Desmond Lewis †	1971	1971	3	5	2	259	88	86.33	-	-	-	-	-	-	8	0
139	Inshan Ali	1971	1977	12	18	2	172	25	10.75	3718	137	1621	34	5/59	47.68	7	-
140	Uton Dowe	1971	1973	4	3	2	8	5*	8.00	1014	30	534	12	4/69	44.50	3	-
141	Lawrence Rowe	1972	1980	30	49	2	2047	302	43.55	86	3	44	0	-	-	17	-
142	Geoff Greenidge	1972	1973	5	9	2	209	50	29.86	156	4	75	0	-	-	3	-
143	Tony Howard	1972	1972	1	0	-	0	-	-	372	16	140	2	2/140	70.00	0	-
144	Alvin Kallicharran ‡	1972	1981	66	109	10	4399	187	44.43	406	14	158	4	2/16	39.50	51	-
145	Raphick Jumadeen	1972	1979	12	14	10	84	56	21.00	3140	140	1141	29	4/72	39.34	4	-
146	Elquemedo Willett	1973	1975	5	8	3	74	26	14.80	1326	78	482	11	3/33	43.82	0	-
147	Ron Headley	1973	1973	2	4	0	62	42	15.50	-	-	-	-	-	-	2	-
148	Bernard Julien	1973	1977	24	34	6	866	121	30.93	4542	192	1868	50	5/57	37.36	14	-
149	Andy Roberts	1974	1983	47	62	11	762	68	14.94	11135	382	5174	202	7/54	25.61	9	-
150	Gordon Greenidge ‡	1974	1991	108	185	16	7558	226	44.72	26	3	4	0	-	-	96	-
151	Viv Richards ‡	1974	1991	121	182	12	8540	291	50.24	5170	203	1964	32	2/17	61.38	122	-
152	Len Baichan	1975	1976	3	6	2	184	105*	46.00	-	-	-	-	-	-	2	-
153	Michael Holding	1975	1987	60	76	10	910	73	13.79	12680	459	5898	249	8/92	23.69	22	-
154	Imtiaz Ali	1976	1976	1	1	1	1	1*	-	204	10	89	2	2/37	44.50	0	-
155	Albert Padmore	1976	1976	2	2	1	8	8*	8.00	474	23	135	1	1/36	135.00	0	-
156	Wayne Daniel	1976	1984	10	11	4	46	11	6.57	1754	60	910	36	5/39	25.28	4	-
157	Larry Gomes	1976	1987	60	91	11	3171	143	39.64	2401	79	930	15	2/20	62.00	18	-
158	Collis King	1976	1980	9	16	3	418	100*	32.15	582	24	282	3	1/30	94.00	5	-
159	Colin Croft	1977	1982	27	37	22	158	33	10.53	6165	211	2913	125	8/29	23.30	8	-
160	Joel Garner	1977	1987	58	68	14	672	60	12.44	13169	575	5433	259	6/56	20.98	42	-
161	Irvine Shillingford	1977	1978	4	7	0	218	120	31.14	-	-	-	-	-	-	1	-
162	Richard Austin	1978	1978	2	2	0	22	20	11.00	6	0	5	0	-	-	2	-
163	Desmond Haynes ‡	1978	1994	116	202	25	7487	184	42.30	18	0	8	1	1/2	8.00	65	-
164	Derick Parry	1978	1980	12	20	3	381	65	22.41	1909	65	936	23	5/15	40.70	4	-
165	Sylvester Clarke	1978	1982	11	16	5	172	35*	15.64	2477	81	1170	42	5/126	27.86	2	-
166	Alvin Greenidge	1978	1979	6	10	0	222	69	22.20	-	-	-	-	-	-	5	-
167	David Murray †	1978	1982	19	31	3	601	84	21.46	-	-	-	-	-	-	57	5
168	Norbert Phillip	1978	1979	9	15	5	297	47	29.70	1820	46	1041	28	4/48	37.18	5	-
169	Sew Shivnarine	1978	1979	8	14	1	379	63	29.15	336	10	167	1	1/13	167.00	6	-
170	Basil Williams	1978	1979	7	12	0	469	111	39.08	-	-	-	-	-	-	5	-
171	Faoud Bacchus	1978	1982	19	30	0	782	250	26.07	6	0	3	0	-	-	17	-
172	Malcolm Marshall	1978	1991	81	107	11	1810	92	18.85	17584	613	7876	376	7/22	20.95	25	-
173	Herbert Chang	1979	1979	1	2	0	8	6	4.00	-	-	-	-	-	-	0	-
174	Rangy Nanan	1980	1980	1	2	0	16	8	8.00	216	7	91	4	2/37	22.75	2	-
175	Everton Mattis	1981	1981	4	5	0	145	71	29.00	36	1	14	0	-	-	3	-
176	Jeff Dujon †	1981	1991	81	115	11	3322	139	31.94	-	-	-	-	-	-	267	5
177	Gus Logie	1983	1991	52	78	9	2470	130	35.80	7	1	4	0	-	-	57	-
178	Winston Davis	1983	1988	15	17	4	202	77	15.54	2773	53	1472	45	4/19	32.71	10	-
179	Eldine Baptiste	1983	1990	10	11	1	233	87*	23.30	1362	60	563	16	3/31	35.19	2	-
180	Richie Richardson ‡	1983	1995	86	146	12	5949	194	44.40	66	4	18	0	-	-	90	-
181	Roger Harper	1983	1993	25	32	3	535	74	18.45	3615	183	1291	46	6/57	28.07	36	-
182	Milton Small	1984	1984	2	1	1	3	3*	-	270	7	153	4	3/40	38.25	0	-
183	Courtney Walsh ‡	1984	2001	132	185	61	936	30*	7.55	30019	1144	12688	519	7/37	24.45	29	-
184	Clyde Butts	1985	1988	7	8	1	108	38	15.43	1554	70	595	10	4/73	59.50	2	-
185	Carlisle Best	1986	1990	8	13	1	342	164	28.50	30	0	21	0	-	-	8	-
186	Patrick Patterson	1986	1992	28	38	16	145	21*	6.59	4829	109	2874	93	5/24	30.90	5	-
187	Thelston Payne †	1986	1986	1	1	0	5	5	5.00	-	-	-	-	-	-	5	0
188	Tony Gray	1986	1987	5	8	2	48	12*	8.00	888	37	377	22	4/39	17.14	6	-
189	Winston Benjamin	1987	1995	21	26	1	470	85	18.80	3694	136	1648	61	4/46	27.02	12	-
190	Carl Hooper ‡	1987	2002	102	173	15	5762	233	36.47	13794	531	5635	114	5/26	49.43	115	-
191	Phil Simmons	1988	1997	26	47	2	1002	110	22.27	624	27	257	4	2/34	64.25	26	-
192	Curtly Ambrose	1988	2000	98	145	29	1439	53	12.41	22103	1001	8501	405	8/45	20.99	18	-
193	Keith Arthurton	1988	1995	33	50	5	1382	157*	30.71	473	14	183	1	1/17	183.00	22	-
194	Ian Bishop	1989	1998	43	63	11	632	48	12.15	8407	288	3909	161	6/40	24.28	8	-
195	Ezra Moseley	1990	1990	2	4	0	35	26	8.75	522	13	261	6	2/70	43.50	1	-
196	Brian Lara ‡	1990	2006	130 (Note: Brian Lara has also played Test cricket for the ICC World XI. Only his record for the West Indies is given here.)	230	6	11912	400*	53.17	60	1	28	0	-	-	164	-
197	Ian Allen	1991	1991	2	2	2	5	4*	-	282	4	180	5	2/69	36.00	1	-
198	Clayton Lambert	1991	1998	5	9	0	284	104	31.56	10	0	5	1	1/4	5.00	8	-
199	Jimmy Adams ‡	1992	2001	54	90	17	3012	208*	41.26	2853	96	1336	27	5/17	49.48	48	-
200	Kenny Benjamin	1992	1998	26	36	8	222	43*	7.93	5132	158	2785	92	6/66	30.27	2	-
201	David Williams †	1992	1998	11	19	1	242	65	13.44	-	-	-	-	-	-	40	2
202	Junior Murray †	1993	2002	33	45	4	918	101*	22.39	-	-	-	-	-	-	99	3
203	Anderson Cummins	1993	1994	5	6	1	98	50	19.60	618	11	342	8	4/54	42.75	1	-
204	Shivnarine Chanderpaul ‡	1994	2015	164	280	49	11867	203*	51.37	1740	50	883	9	1/2	98.11	66	-
205	Stuart Williams	1994	2002	31	52	3	1183	128	24.14	18	0	19	0	-	-	27	-
206	Cameron Cuffy	1994	2002	15	23	9	58	15	4.14	3366	145	1455	43	4/82	33.84	5	-
207	Rajindra Dhanraj	1994	1996	4	4	0	17	9	4.25	1087	32	595	8	2/49	74.38	1	-
208	Sherwin Campbell	1995	2002	52	93	4	2882	208	32.38	-	-	-	-	-	-	47	-
209	Courtney Browne †	1995	2005	20	30	6	387	68	16.13	-	-	-	-	-	-	79	2
210	Ottis Gibson	1995	1999	2	4	0	93	37	23.25	472	9	275	3	2/81	91.67	0	-
211	Robert Samuels	1996	1997	6	12	2	372	125	37.20	-	-	-	-	-	-	8	-
212	Patterson Thompson	1996	1997	2	3	1	17	10*	8.50	228	1	215	5	2/58	43.00	0	-
213	Adrian Griffith	1997	2000	14	27	1	638	114	24.54	-	-	-	-	-	-	5	-
214	Roland Holder	1997	1999	11	17	2	380	91	25.33	-	-	-	-	-	-	9	-
215	Franklyn Rose	1997	2000	19	28	2	344	69	13.23	3124	101	1637	53	7/84	30.89	4	-
216	Mervyn Dillon	1997	2004	38	68	3	549	43	8.45	8704	268	4398	131	5/71	33.57	16	-
217	Floyd Reifer ‡	1997	2009	6	12	0	111	29	9.25	-	-	-	-	-	-	6	-
218	Rawl Lewis	1997	2008	5	10	0	89	40	8.90	883	27	456	4	2/42	114.00	0	-
219	Philo Wallace	1997	1999	7	13	0	279	92	21.46	-	-	-	-	-	-	9	-
220	Nixon McLean	1998	2001	19	32	2	368	46	12.27	3299	85	1873	44	3/53	42.57	5	-
221	Dinanath Ramnarine	1998	2002	12	21	4	106	35*	6.24	3495	169	1383	45	5/78	30.73	8	-
222	Ridley Jacobs ‡†	1998	2004	65	112	21	2577	118	28.32	-	-	-	-	-	-	207	12
223	Daren Ganga ‡	1998	2008	48	86	2	2160	135	25.71	186	2	106	1	1/20	106.00	30	-
224	Reon King	1999	2005	19	27	8	66	12*	3.47	3442	119	1733	53	5/51	32.70	2	-
225	Pedro Collins	1999	2006	32	47	7	235	24	5.87	6964	221	3671	106	6/53	34.63	7	-
226	Dave Joseph	1999	1999	4	7	0	141	50	20.14	-	-	-	-	-	-	10	-
227	Suruj Ragoonath	1999	1999	2	4	1	13	9	4.33	-	-	-	-	-	-	0	-
228	Nehemiah Perry	1999	1999	4	7	1	74	26	12.33	804	24	446	10	5/70	44.60	1	-
229	Lincoln Roberts	1999	1999	1	1	0	0	0*	0.00	-	-	-	-	-	-	0	-
230	Corey Collymore	1999	2007	30	52	27	197	16*	7.88	6337	245	3004	93	7/57	32.30	6	-
231	Ricardo Powell	1999	2004	2	3	0	53	30	17.67	78	2	49	0	-	-	1	-
232	Chris Gayle ‡	2000	2014	103	182	11	7214	333	42.18	7109	230	3120	73	5/34	42.73	96	-
233	Wavell Hinds	2000	2005	45	80	1	2608	213	33.01	1123	41	590	16	3/79	36.88	32	-
234	Ramnaresh Sarwan ‡	2000	2011	87	154	8	5842	291	40.01	2022	33	1163	23	4/37	50.56	53	-
235	Mahendra Nagamootoo	2000	2002	5	8	1	185	68	26.43	1494	68	637	12	3/119	53.08	2	-
236	Marlon Black	2000	2002	6	11	3	21	6	2.63	954	27	597	12	4/83	49.75	0	-
237	Marlon Samuels	2000	2016	71	127	7	3917	260	32.64	4392	79	2445	41	4/13	59.63	28	-
238	Colin Stuart	2000	2001	6	9	2	24	12*	3.43	1116	37	628	20	3/33	31.40	2	-
239	Neil McGarrell	2001	2001	4	6	2	61	33	15.25	1212	65	453	17	4/23	26.65	2	-
240	Leon Garrick	2001	2001	1	2	0	27	27	13.50	-	-	-	-	-	-	2	-
241	Ryan Hinds	2002	2009	15	25	1	505	84	21.04	1743	53	870	13	2/45	66.92	7	-
242	Adam Sanford	2002	2004	11	17	2	72	18*	4.80	2217	69	1316	30	4/132	43.87	4	-
243	Daren Powell	2002	2009	37	57	5	407	36*	7.82	7077	219	4068	85	5/25	47.85	8	-
244	Gareth Breese	2002	2002	1	2	0	5	5	2.50	188	3	135	2	2/108	67.50	1	-
245	Jermaine Lawson	2002	2005	13	21	6	52	14	3.47	2364	55	1512	51	7/78	29.65	3	-
246	Vasbert Drakes	2002	2004	12	20	2	386	67	21.44	2617	65	1362	33	5/93	41.27	2	-
247	Devon Smith	2003	2018	43	76	2	1760	108	23.78	6	0	3	0	-	-	36	-
248	Carlton Baugh †	2003	2011	21	36	2	610	68	17.94	-	-	-	-	-	-	43	5
249	David Bernard	2003	2009	3	6	1	202	69	40.40	258	4	185	4	2/30	46.25	0	-
250	Omari Banks	2003	2005	10	16	4	318	50*	26.50	2401	62	1367	28	4/87	48.82	6	-
251	Tino Best	2003	2013	25	38	6	401	95	12.53	3716	50	2291	80	6/40	40.19	6	-
252	Jerome Taylor	2003	2016	46	73	7	856	106	12.96	7757	258	4480	130	6/47	34.46	8	-
253	Fidel Edwards	2003	2012	55	88	28	394	30	6.56	9602	183	6249	158	7/87	37.87	10	-
254	Dave Mohammed	2004	2006	5	8	1	225	52	32.14	1065	20	668	13	3/98	51.38	1	-
255	Dwayne Smith	2004	2006	10	14	1	320	105*	24.61	651	20	344	7	3/71	49.14	9	-
256	Dwayne Bravo ‡	2004	2010	40	71	1	2200	113	31.42	6466	213	3426	86	6/55	39.83	41	-
257	Sylvester Joseph	2004	2007	5	10	0	147	45	14.70	12	0	8	0	-	-	3	-
258	Narsingh Deonarine	2005	2013	18	30	2	725	82	25.89	1503	49	713	24	4/37	29.70	16	-
259	Donovan Pagon	2005	2005	2	3	0	37	35	12.33	-	-	-	-	-	-	0	-
260	Dwight Washington	2005	2005	1	1	1	7	7*	-	174	4	93	0	-	-	3	-
261	Xavier Marshall	2005	2009	7	12	0	243	85	20.25	12	2	0	0	-	-	7	-
262	Runako Morton	2005	2008	15	27	1	573	70*	22.03	66	0	50	0	-	-	20	-
263	Denesh Ramdin ‡†	2005	2016	74	126	14	2898	166	25.87	-	-	-	-	-	-	205	12
264	Ryan Ramdass	2005	2005	1	2	0	26	23	13.00	-	-	-	-	-	-	2	-
265	Ian Bradshaw	2006	2006	5	8	1	96	33	13.71	1021	33	540	9	3/73	60.00	3	-
266	Daren Sammy ‡	2007	2013	38	63	2	1323	106	21.68	6215	216	3007	84	7/66	35.79	65	-
267	Brenton Parchment	2008	2008	2	4	0	55	20	13.75	-	-	-	-	-	-	1	-
268	Sulieman Benn	2008	2015	26	39	5	486	42	14.29	7321	229	3402	87	6/81	39.10	14	-
269	Sewnarine Chattergoon	2008	2008	4	7	0	127	46	18.14	-	-	-	-	-	-	4	-
270	Amit Jaggernauth	2008	2008	1	2	1	0	0*	0.00	138	0	96	1	1/74	96.00	0	-
271	Lionel Baker	2008	2009	4	6	4	23	17	11.50	660	16	395	5	2/39	79.00	1	-
272	Brendan Nash	2008	2011	21	33	0	1103	114	33.42	492	13	247	2	1/21	123.50	6	-
273	Lendl Simmons	2009	2011	8	16	0	278	49	17.37	192	1	147	1	1/60	147.00	5	-
274	Ryan Austin	2009	2009	2	4	0	39	19	9.75	326	9	155	3	1/29	51.66	3	-
275	Travis Dowlin	2009	2010	6	11	0	343	95	31.18	6	0	3	0	-	-	5	-
276	Nikita Miller	2009	2009	1	2	0	5	5	2.50	132	5	67	0	-	-	0	-
277	Omar Phillips	2009	2009	2	4	0	160	94	40.00	0	-	-	-	-	-	1	-
278	Dale Richards	2009	2010	3	6	0	125	69	20.83	0	-	-	-	-	-	4	-
279	Kemar Roach	2009	2026	91	147	31	1403	58*	12.09	15773	568	8192	304	6/48	26.94	29	-
280	Chadwick Walton †	2009	2009	2	4	0	13	10	3.25	0	-	-	-	-	-	10	0
281	Adrian Barath	2009	2012	15	28	0	657	104	23.46	6	0	3	0	-	-	13	-
282	Ravi Rampaul	2009	2012	18	31	8	335	40*	14.56	3440	111	1705	49	4/48	34.79	3	-
283	Gavin Tonge	2009	2009	1	2	1	25	23*	25.00	168	3	113	1	1/28	113.00	0	-
284	Nelon Pascal	2010	2010	2	2	0	12	10	6.00	102	2	59	0	0/27	-	1	-
285	Shane Shillingford	2010	2014	16	26	6	266	53*	13.30	4694	122	2419	70	6/49	34.55	9	-
286	Brandon Bess	2010	2010	1	2	1	11	11*	11.00	78	0	92	1	1/65	92.00	0	-
287	Darren Bravo	2010	2020	56	102	5	3538	218	36.47	6	0	2	0	-	-	51	-
288	Andre Russell	2010	2010	1	1	0	2	2	2.00	138	2	104	1	1/73	104.00	1	-
289	Devendra Bishoo	2011	2018	36	61	15	707	45	15.36	8067	174	4350	117	8/49	37.17	20	-
290	Kraigg Brathwaite ‡	2011	2025	100	193	10	5950	212	32.51	2809	35	1558	29	6/29	53.72	49	-
291	Kirk Edwards	2011	2014	17	32	1	986	121	31.80	24	0	19	0	-	-	15	-
292	Kieran Powell	2011	2021	44	83	1	2113	134	25.76	6	1	0	0	-	-	31	-
293	Shannon Gabriel	2012	2023	59	88	34	229	20*	4.24	9379	269	5348	166	8/62	32.21	16	-
294	Assad Fudadin	2012	2012	3	5	1	122	55	30.50	30	1	11	0	-	-	4	-
295	Sunil Narine	2012	2013	6	7	2	40	22*	8.00	1650	60	851	21	6/91	40.52	2	-
296	Veerasammy Permaul	2012	2022	9	13	2	145	26*	13.18	2114	46	1183	31	5/35	38.16	4	-
297	Sheldon Cottrell	2013	2014	2	4	0	11	5	2.75	276	4	196	2	1/72	98.00	2	-
298	Jermaine Blackwood	2014	2023	56	102	6	2898	112*	30.18	454	12	264	4	2/14	66.00	45	-
299	Jason Holder ‡	2014	2024	69	123	20	3073	202*	29.83	11305	485	4924	162	6/42	30.39	71	-
300	Leon Johnson	2014	2016	9	16	0	403	66	25.18	24	0	9	0	-	-	7	-
301	Kenroy Peters	2014	2014	1	1	0	0	0	0.00	120	7	69	2	2/69	34.50	0	-
302	Shai Hope †	2015	2025	49	93	3	2518	147	27.97	-	-	-	-	-	-	77	2
303	Shane Dowrich †	2015	2020	35	62	8	1570	125*	29.07	-	-	-	-	-	-	85	5
304	Rajendra Chandrika	2015	2016	5	10	0	140	37	14.00	-	-	-	-	-	-	2	-
305	Jomel Warrican	2015	2026	27	47	18	398	41	13.72	5615	146	2772	100	7/32	27.72	9	-
306	Carlos Brathwaite	2015	2016	3	5	1	181	69	45.25	408	9	242	1	1/30	242.00	0	-
307	Roston Chase ‡	2016	2026	63	114	5	2851	194	26.15	8341	151	4926	102	8/60	48.28	32	-
308	Miguel Cummins	2016	2019	14	22	7	114	24*	7.60	1976	60	1084	27	6/48	40.14	2	-
309	Alzarri Joseph	2016	2026	42	67	2	804	86	12.36	7024	179	4363	130	5/27	33.56	18	-
310	Shimron Hetmyer	2017	2019	16	30	0	838	93	27.93	-	-	-	-	-	-	7	-
311	Vishaul Singh	2017	2017	3	6	0	63	32	10.50	-	-	-	-	-	-	2	-
312	Kyle Hope	2017	2017	5	9	0	101	43	11.22	-	-	-	-	-	-	3	-
313	Sunil Ambris	2017	2018	6	12	1	166	43	15.09	-	-	-	-	-	-	2	-
314	Raymon Reifer	2017	2023	8	14	1	298	62	22.92	336	11	170	3	1/36	56.66	5	-
315	Keemo Paul	2018	2019	3	6	0	96	47	16.00	342	11	189	6	2/25	31.50	2	-
316	Shermon Lewis	2018	2018	2	4	0	24	20	6.00	240	2	162	3	2/93	54.00	1	-
317	John Campbell	2019	2026	31	61	7	1541	115	28.53	61	0	30	0	-	-	20	-
318	Shamarh Brooks	2019	2022	13	24	0	553	111	23.04	-	-	-	-	-	-	12	-
319	Rahkeem Cornwall	2019	2023	10	17	3	261	73	18.64	2761	84	1316	35	7/75	37.60	15	-
320	Jahmar Hamilton †	2019	2019	1	2	0	5	5	2.50	-	-	-	-	-	-	5	0
321	Joshua Da Silva †	2020	2026	35	62	9	1306	100*	24.64	-	-	-	-	-	-	123	6
322	Chemar Holder	2020	2020	1	2	2	21	13*	-	156	1	110	2	2/110	55.00	0	-
323	Nkrumah Bonner	2021	2022	15	25	4	803	123	38.23	114	2	82	1	1/16	82.00	14	-
324	Kyle Mayers	2021	2023	18	32	3	949	210*	32.72	1524	77	622	34	5/18	18.29	10	-
325	Shayne Moseley	2021	2021	2	4	0	28	12	7.00	-	-	-	-	-	-	3	-
326	Jayden Seales	2021	2026	32	52	20	266	32	8.31	5300	168	2954	113	6/61	26.14	11	-
327	Jeremy Solozano	2021	2021	1	-	-	-	-	-	-	-	-	-	-	-	0	-
328	Gudakesh Motie	2022	2025	11	17	5	265	55	22.08	1740	45	946	35	7/37	27.02	5	-
329	Anderson Phillip	2021	2025	6	11	3	132	43	16.50	822	11	659	10	3/70	65.90	3	-
330	Tagenarine Chanderpaul	2022	2026	16	31	2	815	207*	28.10	-	-	-	-	-	-	7	-
331	Marquino Mindley	2022	2022	1	2	1	11	11*	11.00	12	0	11	0	-	-	0	-
332	Devon Thomas	2022	2022	1	2	0	31	19	15.50	96	1	66	2	2/53	33.00	1	-
333	Alick Athanaze	2023	2025	17	33	0	781	92	23.66	156	2	79	1	1/53	79.00	14	-
334	Kirk McKenzie	2023	2024	6	12	0	203	50	16.91	-	-	-	-	-	-	4	-
335	Justin Greaves	2024	2026	20	37	4	1112	202*	33.69	1716	49	946	32	5/27	29.56	22	-
336	Kavem Hodge	2024	2026	19	36	2	1070	140*	31.47	420	1	328	6	2/44	54.66	17	-
337	Shamar Joseph	2024	2026	17	31	4	420	44	15.55	2652	59	1721	69	7/68	24.94	5	-
338	Kevin Sinclair	2024	2025	4	8	1	118	50	16.85	552	6	384	9	3/61	42.66	4	-
339	Mikyle Louis	2024	2025	10	20	0	369	97	18.45	-	-	-	-	-	-	3	-
340	Keacy Carty	2024	2025	7	14	0	235	42	16.78	-	-	-	-	-	-	1	-
341	Tevin Imlach †	2025	2025	6	12	1	169	35	15.36	-	-	-	-	-	-	18	2
342	Amir Jangoo	2025	2026	7	11	1	508	233	50.80	-	-	-	-	-	-	5	1
343	Brandon King	2025	2026	12	22	2	660	81*	33.00	-	-	-	-	-	-	9	-
344	Kevlon Anderson	2025	2025	1	2	0	3	3	1.50	-	-	-	-	-	-	3	-
345	Johann Layne	2025	2025	2	3	0	15	14	5.00	234	1	165	1	1/47	165.00	0	-
346	Khary Pierre	2025	2025	2	4	1	47	23	15.66	402	3	246	1	1/91	246.00	0	-
347	Ojay Shields	2025	2025	2	3	0	9	9	3.00	252	6	176	5	2/34	35.20	0	-
348	Joshua Bishop	2026	2026	2	3	1	58	23	29.00	300	3	165	2	2/61	82.50	2	-
349	Kevin Wickham	2026	2026	1	2	0	139	78	69.50	-	-	-	-	-	-	1	-

== See also ==
- Test cricket
- West Indian cricket team
- List of West Indian women's Test cricketers
- List of West Indies ODI cricketers
- List of West Indies Twenty20 International cricketers
