= Dickie Fuller =

Jamaican cricketer

Personal information
- Full name: Richard Livingston Fuller
- Born: 30 January 1913; St Ann's Bay, St Ann, Jamaica
- Died: 3 May 1987 (aged 74); Kingston, Jamaica
- Batting: Right-handed
- Bowling: Right-arm fast-medium
- Role: All-rounder

International information
- National side: West Indies
- Only Test (cap 43): 14 March 1935 v England

Domestic team information
- Years: Team
- 1934–35 to 1946–47: Jamaica

Career statistics
Competition	Tests	First-class
Matches	1	8
Runs scored	1	280
Batting average	1.00	28.00
100s/50s	0/0	1/0
Top score	1	113*
Balls bowled	48	1038
Wickets	0	12
Bowling average	–	43.66
5 wickets in innings	–	0
10 wickets in match	–	0
Best bowling	–	4/69
Catches/stumpings	0/–	5/–
- Source: Cricinfo, 5 October 2019

Richard Livingston Fuller (30 January 1913 – 3 May 1987) was a West Indian cricketer from Jamaica who played in one Test in 1934–35.

Dickie Fuller was a burly all-rounder who batted in the lower order and bowled right-arm fast-medium with a slinging action. He made his first-class debut for Jamaica in two matches against the touring English team in March 1935. In the first match he was Jamaica's most successful bowler with four wickets, and in the second match, batting at number eight, he hit 113 not out, reaching his century in 130 minutes. He was included in the Test team for the match that began in Kingston a few days later, but his contribution to the West Indies' innings victory was negligible.

Fuller played English league cricket for Seaham Harbour in the Durham League in the early 1950s, and also played in Scotland. He then served as Government Sports Coach in Jamaica from 1956 to 1968.
