= Manny Martindale =

West Indian cricketer (1909–1972)

Personal information
- Full name: Emmanuel Alfred Martindale
- Born: 25 November 1909; St Lucy, Barbados
- Died: 17 March 1972 (aged 62); St Peter, Barbados
- Nickname: Manny
- Height: 5 ft 8.5 in (1.74 m)
- Batting: Right-handed
- Bowling: Right-arm fast
- Role: Bowler

International information
- National side: West Indies
- Test debut (cap 32): 24 June 1933 v England
- Last Test: 22 August 1939 v England

Domestic team information
- Years: Team
- 1929/30–1935/36: Barbados

Career statistics
Competition	Test	FC
Matches	10	59
Runs scored	58	972
Batting average	5.27	15.18
100s/50s	0/0	1/0
Top score	22	134
Balls bowled	1,605	9,964
Wickets	37	203
Bowling average	21.72	25.64
5 wickets in innings	3	11
10 wickets in match	0	1
Best bowling	5/22	8/32
Catches/stumpings	5/–	29/–
- Source: CricInfo, 12 December 2011

Emmanuel Alfred Martindale (25 November 1909 – 17 March 1972) was a West Indian cricketer who played in ten Test matches from 1933 to 1939. He was a right-arm fast bowler with a long run up; although not tall for a bowler of his type he bowled at a fast pace. With Learie Constantine, Martindale was one of the earliest in the long succession of Test-playing West Indian fast bowlers. During the time he played, the West Indies bowling attack depended largely on his success. Critics believe that his record and performances stand comparison with bowlers of greater reputation and longer careers.

Chosen for the West indies tour of England in 1933 despite having played little cricket and being an unknown quantity, he was a great success. He took over 100 first-class wickets and took over half of the West Indies' wickets in the three Tests played. He was the leading bowler when West Indies won their first Test series, against England in 1934–35, and had great success against the leading English batsmen. In the final game of the series, one of his deliveries broke the jaw of Bob Wyatt, the England captain. When he returned to tour England a second time in 1939, Martindale was less successful, but he had by then established himself in League Cricket in England. He moved there to play initially for Burnley Cricket Club, but remained in England for the next 28 years as a professional cricketer. Upon returning to live in Barbados in 1964, Martindale took up coaching. He died in 1972.

== The 1933 tour to England ==
In the limited first-class cricket schedule played in the West Indies, Martindale had played in only four matches up to his arrival in England for the 1933 West Indies tour, and had taken only 14 wickets in them, including five in the trial match. He had played so little cricket that few people in the West Indies knew much about him, but his reputation grew very quickly during the tour. As such, his rise to prominence came after he was selected for representative cricket rather than from his early performances for Barbados.

=== Early success ===
In England, he was spotted very quickly as a potential success: The Times, reporting on the team's first practice the day after their arrival, wrote: "Within the limitations of net-practice (they) showed that in E. Martindale they have a bowler of pace worthy to succeed Constantine and Francis."

When the proper cricket started, Martindale was immediately successful. In his second first-class match of the tour (and the third first-class game) against Essex he took eight first-innings wickets for just 32 runs and followed that with four for 73 in the second innings to finish with match figures of 12 for 105: these would remain the best innings and match figures of his career. With an eye on the Bodyline controversy which had featured in England's tour of Australia the previous winter, The Times reported of Martindale: "It is very pleasant indeed to see a fast bowler bowling in the old tradition, packing his slips and attacking the off-stump rather than the leg-side ... The Essex batsmen not only got out to him but were thoroughly beaten during the brief time they were in."

Constantine was contracted to play Lancashire League cricket for Nelson and was released for only five matches across the summer: in the first of these, he and Martindale took nine of the 10 MCC first-innings wickets. Martindale returned five for 70, but both bowlers were criticised in the press for bowling short at the MCC batsmen. In the following match, against Hampshire, Martindale took six second-innings wickets for 61, and in the first-class averages published at the last weekend of May 1933, he had taken 34 first-class wickets at an average of 14.20 runs per wicket, more than twice as many wickets as any of his teammates.

Martindale was less effective in June when he also missed, or bowled less in, a couple of matches because of a "strain". He was fit, however, to open the bowling for the West Indies in the first Test at Lord's at the end of the month alongside Francis, recalled because Nelson CC would not release Constantine for the match; Martindale took four wickets for 85 runs, but England won easily by an innings. July brought a second eight-wicket innings for Martindale: the match against Nottinghamshire was cut short by rain, but Martindale's eight wickets for 66 runs included five batsmen clean bowled.

=== Bodyline controversy ===
During the previous winter, England had played Australia in the controversial Bodyline series in which the English bowlers were accused of bowling the ball roughly on the line of leg stump. The deliveries were often short-pitched with four or five fielders close by on the leg side waiting to catch deflections off the bat. The tactics were difficult for batsmen to counter and were designed to be intimidatory. By the 1933 season, it had become a sensitive subject. In the game against Yorkshire, in which Martindale did not play, the West Indies captain Jackie Grant was frustrated to discover that the home team had prepared a soft pitch which reduced the effectiveness of fast bowling and he ordered Constantine to bowl Bodyline. The tactics were not effective in that instance, but Grant and Constantine discussed the matter further and decided to use Bodyline during the second Test. West Indies scored 375 and when England replied, Martindale and Constantine bowled Bodyline. The pair bowled up to four short deliveries each over so that the ball rose to head height; occasionally they bowled around the wicket. Many of the English batsmen were discomfited, and a short ball from Martindale struck Wally Hammond on the chin, forcing him to retire hurt. Martindale was the faster bowler but Constantine was also capable of bursts of great pace. Even so, the England captain Douglas Jardine, the man responsible for the Bodyline tactics used in Australia, batted for five hours to score his only Test century. Many critics praised Jardine's batting and bravery in the game. The ball carried through slowly on another soft pitch, which reduced the effectiveness of the Bodyline tactics, but public disapproval expressed during and after the match was instrumental in turning English attitudes against Bodyline. Not all contemporary reports disapproved of the tactics; The Times report said there had been "plenty of fun" in the play. The bowling brought Martindale success, with a return of five wickets for 73, against just one wicket for Constantine. In West Indies second innings, England also bowled Bodyline, but the match was drawn.

The third and final Test of the summer was anti-climax for the West Indies team, with the match at The Oval lost by an innings after England had the better batting conditions on the Saturday and debutant Charles Marriott took 11 wickets in his only Test. Martindale, however, continued to thrive with five wickets for 93 runs in England's innings, although The Times report suggested that he bowled at times too short. The five wickets meant Martindale finished the series with 14 wickets at an average of 17.92; his bowling colleagues in the series took only 12 wickets and those were at a cost of 58.33 each. This was the best performance by a West Indian bowler in a Test series up until that point.

Immediately after this final Test, the West Indian team went to Blackpool to play a first-class match against a team raised by Sir Lindsay Parkinson; Martindale took eight wickets in an innings for the third time in the season, this time for 39 runs. A further five-wicket haul in the last match of the season against H. D. G. Leveson-Gower's XI took him past 100 wickets for the season. Martindale finished the 1933 season with 103 first-class wickets at an average of 20.98; Ellis Achong took 71 at an average of 36.14 and no other bowler on the tour took more than 50 wickets. He emulated the feat of Constantine in taking 100 wickets in 1928, but unlike Constantine, Martindale had few other effective bowlers to support him. In its review of the West Indian tour in its 1934 edition, Wisden singled out Martindale and batsman George Headley as "indispensable" and the "giants" of the team. Like Headley with the bat, Martindale was under pressure to succeed as the success of the team depended on his performances. Headley was picked as one of its Cricketers of the Year, but Martindale was not.

== Later Test matches ==
=== Tests in the West Indies ===
Martindale played for Barbados in the Inter-Colonial Tournament in both 1933–34 and 1934–35 and was personally successful, though his team did not win the tournament in either year. In the second season, MCC sent a team composed of a few established Test players and some new names to play four Test matches, each of them preceded by games against the host colony. Martindale made little impact in the two Barbados matches against the touring side, failing to take a wicket in either game. The second of these games was badly affected by rain and the bad weather spilled over into the Test match that followed, leading to events that were rated as unusual for the time: England captain Bob Wyatt won the toss but put the West Indies in on a wet pitch, and later he declared England's innings closed 21 runs behind the West Indian total. The West Indies then declared their second innings setting England only 72 to win. Batting conditions remained very difficult throughout and Wyatt rearranged his batting order to keep his players away from Martindale in the hope batting would become easier. Martindale took five wickets for 22 runs in 8.3 overs from Martindale, but an innings of 29 from Hammond took England to a four-wicket victory; Hammond won the game by hitting Martindale for six. Martindale took eight wickets in the match, but lacked support to win the game as Constantine was absent.

In the first Test, Martindale's fast bowling partner had been Leslie Hylton; for the second Test in Trinidad, they were joined by Constantine. Wyatt's strange captaincy was a factor in England's defeat in this match – he again put the West Indies on winning the toss, and, when England were set 325 to win, he reversed the England batting order, and a collapse to 75 for five wickets proved too much for the better batsmen to recover from. Martindale had a quiet game, taking only one wicket. The third Test in British Guiana was rain-affected and slow-scoring, and it petered out to a tame draw, with three wickets for Martindale in England's first innings. West Indies' series-winning victory in the fourth and final Test in Jamaica was based on an unbeaten innings of 270 by the local hero Headley, but Martindale and Constantine, with 13 wickets between them, were the dominant bowlers. Wyatt, opening England's first innings, ducked into a fast delivery outside off stump from Martindale; the batsman expected the ball to lift sharply but it bounced normally and struck him on the jaw. He sustained a compound fracture, retired hurt, and did not bat in the second innings. On regaining consciousness, Wyatt signalled for pencil and paper and, along with amending his team's batting order, made it clear that he attached no blame to Martindale. This particular incident was remembered in Jamaica for many years and was regarded as a defining moment of Martindale's career.

In the series as a whole, Martindale topped the West Indies bowling averages with 19 wickets at an average of 12.57; Constantine, in three matches, took 15 at 13.13 and Hylton 13 at 19.30. In his history of West Indies cricket, Michael Manley notes that by the time of this series, Martindale had increased his speed and improved his bowling through experience. The pace combination of Martindale, Constantine and Hylton, accounted for 47 of the 64 wickets to fall, according to Manley "a performance which anticipated the later preponderance of fast bowling in the West Indies." The bowling of these three was also cited by Wisden as the main reason why the Test series was eventually won. Manley further comments that Martindale's success came against some very good batsmen, but he "virtually destroyed England".

=== Return to England ===
Martindale played for Barbados until January 1936, when he played his last first-class game in the Caribbean. In Martindale's career, the match is notable for an unusual reason: his batting. Barbados, chasing 409 to win the match against Trinidad, had subsided to 108 for seven wickets in their second innings when Martindale came in to bat at No 9, joining his fellow fast bowler Foffie Williams. The pair put on 255 for the eighth wicket which, 75 years on, remains the highest stand for this wicket in West Indies first-class cricket; Martindale made 134, the only score of more than 50 in his career, and Williams was undefeated on 131 when Trinidad won the match by 36 runs.

Thereafter, Martindale's main cricket was played in England as he followed Constantine's example by signing as a professional in the Lancashire League, playing for three seasons from 1936 with Burnley Cricket Club. Although primarily recruited for his bowling, he also batted high in the batting order, sometimes opening the innings. In an early match for Burnley, against Church, he took nine wickets in an innings and spoiled his own record by catching the tenth batsman off a different bowler. In 1938 the English fast bowler Ken Farnes regarded Martindale as the world's fastest bowler.

Like Constantine, who also played League Cricket, Martindale chose to suspend his contract with Burnley for 1939 to allow his selection for West Indies. The team toured England that season and Martindale resumed his place in the team alongside Constantine and Hylton as the spearhead of the West Indies' pace attack. Unlike his previous tour in 1933, he was not effective and Wisden reported that he "fell off in pace and accuracy". Despite his greater experience and his time in league cricket, Bridgette Lawrence notes that he had passed his peak. With Hylton also out of sorts, only Constantine of the pace attack was in form, and he took 103 wickets in the season, as Martindale had done six years earlier. Martindale's own figures were disappointing: he took only 46 wickets in the season at the high average of 34.50 and only four wickets in the three-Test series. His one game of success was the match against Leicestershire when he took five wickets for 57 runs in the county's only innings. With war imminent, the final matches of the tour were left unplayed, and the third Test at The Oval proved to be Martindale's last appearance in first-class cricket.

== Later career ==
Although Martindale's first-class career ended in 1939, he continued in high-standard cricket for many years afterwards. During the Second World War, he was based in Lancashire, and he appeared for a large number of the ad hoc teams that played one-off fixtures on many grounds in the north-west of England. From 1947 to 1951 he was the professional at the Lancashire League club Lowerhouse and two of his sons, Alfred and Colin, also began playing for Lowerhouse, so that in at least one league match three Martindales appeared in the same team. In 1952 and 1953 he played for Norton in the North Staffs and District League winning the league title with them in 1953 and taking 80 wickets in the process. In 1955, he had a single season as professional for Bacup, also in the Lancashire League. Martindale continued to play into his 54th year, playing two seasons for Great Harwood in the Ribblesdale League in 1962 and 1963. He returned to live in Barbados in December 1964 after 28 years playing league cricket in England. His obituary in the 1973 edition of Wisden reported that in League cricket "he earned much popularity and respect, both on and off the field".

After his return to the Caribbean, Martindale coached the Bermuda cricket team for a period before working for the Barbados Government Sports Department until shortly before his death in 1972.

== Personal life ==
From the time he began to play league cricket, Martindale and his family lived in Burnley, Lancashire. He and his wife had five children, three girls and two boys; all but one of the family entered the teaching profession in England. Martindale and his wife returned to live in Barbados in 1964.

== Style and technique ==
"Like all fast bowlers, Martindale imparted menace", according to Michael Manley. Although not particularly tall, Martindale generated pace from his powerful shoulders and thighs and was able to bowl for long periods. He had a long, smooth run-up and gathered himself shortly before delivery, which contrasted with the more explosive bowling of Constantine. After he bowled the ball, it seemed to bounce very quickly off the pitch. His Wisden obituary stated: "His pace was remarkable in view of the fact that he stood no higher than 5 ft. 8½ in." Manley compares his bowling style to that of Ray Lindwall, Harold Larwood and Malcolm Marshall, and notes Martindale's quality was such that he would have fitted perfectly into the West Indian teams which dominated world cricket in the 1970s and 1980s through concentrating on pace bowling. Bridgette Lawrence notes that Martindale "quickly won recognition as West Indies' first great Test fast bowler" and that he "carried West Indies' pace attack in their early years of Test match status with the same skill and panache as Headley did their batting." Martindale's record may have been even better but for poor West Indian fielding during the period he played: the slip fielders regularly dropped catches from the fast bowlers. Lawrence also notes that Martindale played just ten Tests owing to West Indies' limited programme at the time, but "if his figures are analysed pro-rata, it quickly becomes apparent that Martindale compares with the finest fast bowlers of today."

== Bibliography ==
- Douglas, Christopher (2002). Douglas Jardine: Spartan Cricketer. London: Methuen. ISBN 0-413-77216-0.
- Frith, David (2002). Bodyline Autopsy. The full story of the most sensational Test cricket series: Australia v England 1932–33. London: Aurum Press. ISBN 1-85410-896-4.
- Howat, Gerald (1976). Learie Constantine. Newton Abbot: Readers Union Limited.
- Lawrence, Bridgette; Goble, Ray (1991). The Complete Record of West Indian Test Cricketers. Leicester: ACL and Polar Publishing (UK) Ltd. ISBN 0-9514862-2-5.
- Manley, Michael (1995) [1988]. A History of West Indies Cricket. London: Andre Deutsch. ISBN 0-233-98937-4.
- Mason, Peter (2008). Learie Constantine. Oxford: Signal Books Limited. ISBN 978-1-904955-42-9.
