= Kenneth Wishart =

West Indian cricketer (1908–1972)

Ken Wishart
Personal information
- Full name: Kenneth Leslie Wishart
- Born: 28 November 1908; London
- Died: 18 October 1972 (aged 63); Georgetown
- Batting: Left-handed
- Role: Opening batsman

International information
- National side: West Indies
- Only Test (cap 42): 14 February 1935 v England

Career statistics
Competition	Test	First-class
Matches	1	16
Runs scored	52	706
Batting average	26.00	23.53
100s/50s	0/1	0/5
Top score	52	88
Catches/stumpings	0/0	7/0
- Source: CricInfo, 10 September 2022

Kenneth Leslie Wishart (18 November 1908 – 18 October 1972) was a West Indian international cricketer who played in one Test match against England in 1934–35.

A left-handed opening batsman, he appeared for British Guiana between 1928/29 and 1946/47. Following his playing career, he was involved with West Indies cricket administration including serving on the West Indies Cricket Board of Control from 1949 to 1971.

== Career ==
Wishart was born in London on 18 November 1908. His father, William de Wever Wishart, was a doctor who became the first medical officer of health for Georgetown.

Wishart made his first-class debut for British Guiana against Trinidad during the 1928/29 Inter-Colonial Tournament. The following season, he appeared in both matches for British Guiana against the touring MCC team, (Note: At the time the MCC organised and administered English cricket. Official English touring teams always played under the name of MCC and were only styled "England" during Test matches.) opening the batting he scored 88 in the first fixture and added scores of 77 and 46 in the second.

On the MCC's next tour of the Caribbean in 1934/35, Wishart featured in both of British Guiana's matches against the tourists and scored 56 in the second game. He was selected for the West Indies team to play against England at Bourda, his home ground, in the third Test of the series. He scored 52 in the first innings before being run out, his batting was considered slow in contrast to George Headley who added 53 of their third wicket partnership of 79. Wishart was dismissed for a duck in the second innings as the match was drawn. He was not retained for the fourth Test in Jamaica with selectors having a policy of preferring players from the nation that staged the Test match.

Wishart continued to play in first-class cricket until 1946/47. After his playing career he was a leading figure in West Indies cricket administration. He was the British Guiana (later Guyana) representative on the West Indies Cricket Board of Control from 1949 to 1971 and served as secretary of the board during the early 1960s. He was President of the Guyana Cricket Association at the time of his death.

Wishart died in Georgetown on 18 October 1972, at the age of 63. A stand at the Bourda ground is named in his honour.
