= Leslie Hylton =

Jamaican cricketer

Personal information
- Full name: Leslie George Hylton
- Born: 29 March 1905; Kingston, Colony of Jamaica
- Died: 17 May 1955 (aged 50); Saint Catherine District Prison, Spanish Town, St Catherine, Colony of Jamaica
- Batting: Right-handed
- Bowling: Right-arm fast

International information
- National side: West Indies
- Test debut (cap 40): 8 January 1935 v England
- Last Test: 22 July 1939 v England

Career statistics
Competition	Tests	First-class
Matches	6	40
Runs scored	70	843
Batting average	11.66	18.73
100s/50s	0/0	0/5
Top score	19	80
Balls bowled	965	6,811
Wickets	16	120
Bowling average	26.12	25.62
5 wickets in innings	0	3
10 wickets in match	0	0
Best bowling	4/27	5/24
Catches/stumpings	1/–	31/–
- Source: CricInfo, 11 June 2008

Leslie George Hylton (29 March 1905 – 17 May 1955) was a Jamaican cricketer, a right-arm bowler and useful lower-order batsman who played in six Test matches for the West Indies between 1935 and 1939. In May 1955 he was hanged for the murder of his wife, whom he had shot in a jealous rage a year earlier.

Born into poverty, Hylton became a regular member of the Jamaican cricket side from 1927. Although overlooked on several occasions for the full West Indies team, he was finally selected in 1935, to face the visiting English touring team. He performed well, as part of a trio of fast bowlers that also included Learie Constantine and Manny Martindale, and helped to secure a West Indies victory in the four-match Test series. He was chosen again in 1939, for a three-Test tour of England, but was out of form and lost his place in the Test side. On his return home he retired from first-class cricket.

In 1942 Hylton married Lurline Rose, the daughter of a police inspector. A son was born in 1947. In the early 1950s, Lurline Hylton's ambitions to be a dress designer led to long absences at fashion schools in New York. There, she met up with Roy Francis, a reputed philanderer, and the two began an affair. When Hylton learned of this he confronted his wife, and after initial denials she confessed. Hylton then shot her seven times. His defence of provocation was rejected by the court, which found him guilty and sentenced him to death. Legal appeals, and a petition for clemency, proved to be of no avail as the law took its course.

Hylton has been generally overlooked in cricket histories. The 1956 Wisden included an obituary that contained the date but not the manner or circumstances of his death. Many years later an addendum briefly gave the details. Later writers have considered the case more sympathetically, and have linked Hylton's treatment to his background of deprivation and to judicial intransigence.

== Family background and early life ==
Hylton was born on 29 March 1905, in Kingston, Jamaica. He was brought up in difficult family circumstances, in the lower strata of Jamaican society, not knowing who his father was. His mother died when he was three years old, and he was raised by his sister, who died when he was barely a teenager. His education was intermittent and incomplete; on the death of his aunt, he left school and became an apprentice in a tailor's shop. He appears to have made little progress in this trade, and took up a variety of unskilled jobs before becoming a dock labourer.

Despite the handicap of his impoverished background, Hylton grew up to be strong and athletic, and acquired considerable skill and a local reputation as a cricketer. When and how he began to play is not recorded; in his book A History of West Indies Cricket, Michael Manley surmises that most impoverished Kingston youngsters learned the game using a coconut branch and a tennis ball. The cricket historian Mike Marqusee writes that, by the early 20th century, all social classes in the West Indies had taken up cricket, although clubs were typically stratified in a hierarchy of skin tones. By the 1920s even the more exclusive cricket clubs of the colonies had begun to accept into their numbers talented cricketers such as Hylton, from the lower orders of society. According to Manley, "it was becoming increasingly clear that the descendants of the former slaves showed remarkable aptitude for the game". It was the normal course of events that black, uncoached players such as Hylton should emerge as bowlers rather than batsmen.

== Cricketing career ==
=== Early matches ===
Hylton developed as an all-rounder, a bowler who could vary speed with spin and who could also perform usefully as a batsman. In the 1920s, opportunities for first-class cricket in Jamaica were limited, since its distance from the other West Indies cricketing colonies prevented its participation in inter-colonial tournaments. First-class opposition was provided from time to time by visiting teams from England. One such touring side arrived at the beginning of 1927, led by the former England Test captain Lionel Tennyson and containing several other English Test cricketers including Percy Fender and Ernest Tyldesley. The party's fixtures included three representative first-class matches against the Jamaica XI; Hylton, aged 21, had been noticed in local cricket, and was given a place in the Jamaican side for the first match, which began at the Sabina Park ground in Kingston on 19 February 1927.

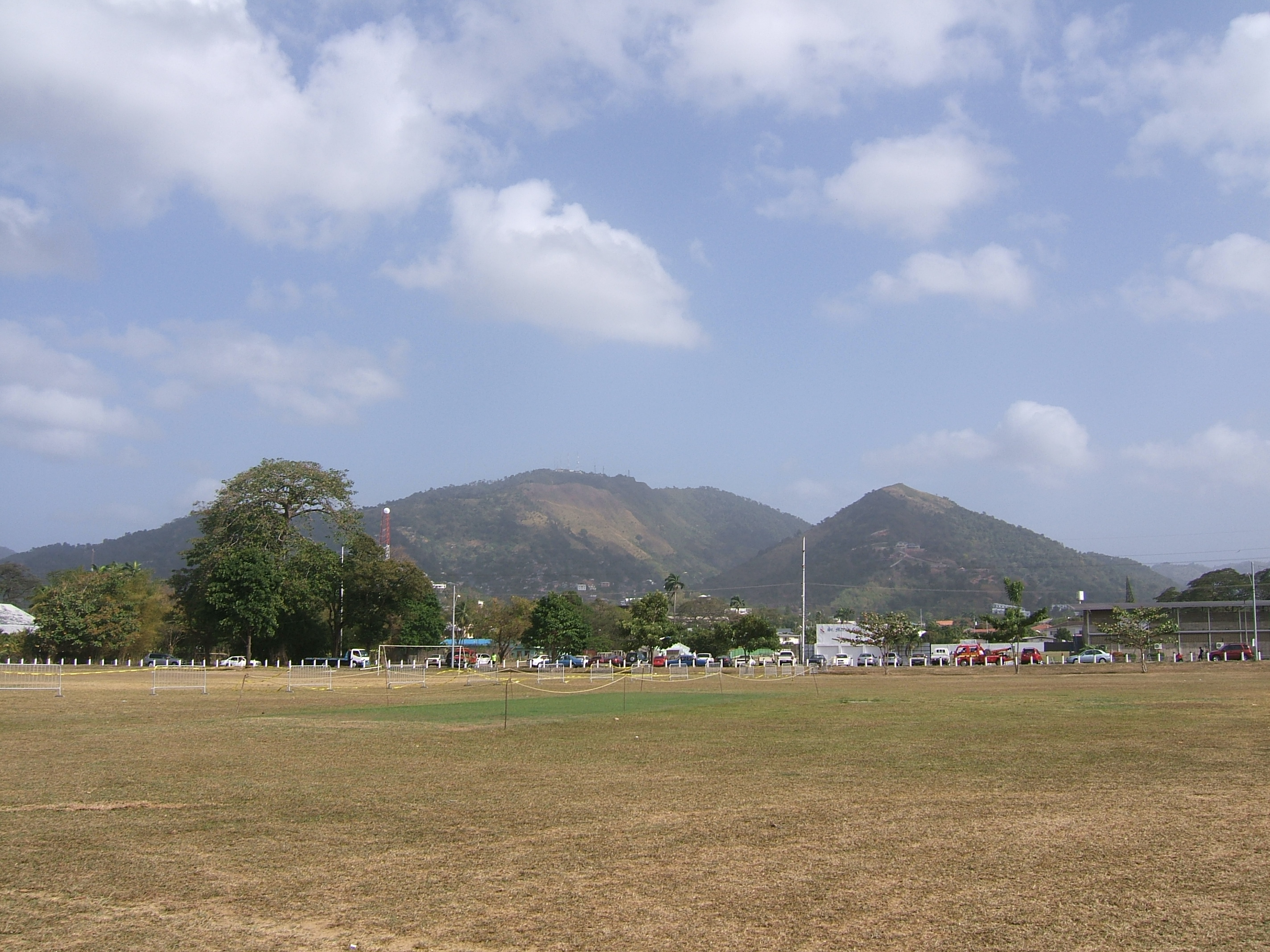
A view of the Sabina Park stadium, across the practice ground

In the match, Hylton scored 32 and 7 in his two innings, being not out in each case. He failed to take a wicket as a bowler, but held two catches in the field. He kept his place for the second representative game, played at Melbourne Park, and made his mark as a bowler by taking 5 Tennyson XI wickets for 34 runs in the tourists' first innings, and 3 for 53 in their second. These performances were enough to establish a regular place in the Jamaican side. In December 1927 he travelled to Bridgetown, Barbados, to take part in a trial match which would help select the touring party for the West Indies' debut Test series, to be played against England in 1928. Hylton's performance in the match was modest, and he was not chosen for the England tour. The cricket writer Mark Whitaker believes that race may have been a factor in Hylton's non-selection, on this and later occasions: "[T]he snooty Bridgetown press dismissed him as a 'slinger' and a 'garden bowler'. Inter-island rivalry in the Caribbean of the 1920s had a nasty edge of colour-consciousness, and Leslie Hylton was very black indeed".

When Tennyson brought another team to Jamaica early in 1928, Hylton played in all three representative matches, the first two of which were won by Jamaica, the third being drawn. In this last game Hylton showed his potential as a batsman, scoring half-centuries in each of his two innings.

During the following years, the Jamaica side played little top-grade cricket, and Hylton's opportunities to shine were very limited. He was not selected for the West Indies side that in early 1930 played a four-Test home series against a weak MCC side (Note: From 1903, England's overseas cricket tours were organised and managed by the Marylebone Cricket Club. The teams travelled as "MCC", only becoming "England" when they played Test matches. This arrangement persisted until late in the 20th century, when the administration of English cricket was reorganised.) led by the Hon. F.S.G. Calthorpe, although he played for Jamaica when they faced the tourists at Melbourne Park in March 1930. His opponents in this match included the England Test veterans Wilfred Rhodes and George Gunn, as well as emergent players such as Les Ames and Bill Voce. Hylton was also overlooked when the West Indies party to tour Australia in 1930–31 was chosen, likewise when the team to visit England in 1933 was selected. Between March 1928 and January 1935 he played in just five first-class matches. In one of these, against Sir Julien Cahn's XI at Melbourne Park in February 1929, he recorded his career-best bowling figures of 5 for 24. Cahn's XI included several current and past Test players.

=== Test series 1934–35 v. England ===
Although the MCC team that visited the West Indies in 1934–35 was lacking one or two of England's best players such as Herbert Sutcliffe and Hedley Verity, it was nevertheless a strong combination; one local paper described it as "the strongest batting strength that ever visited these shores". Led by R.E.S Wyatt, the side included most of England's current batting stars, among them Wally Hammond and Maurice Leyland. Close to his 30th birthday, Hylton was at last favoured by the selectors and chosen for the first Test match of the series, to be played at the Kensington Oval in Bridgetown, Barbados beginning on 8 January 1935.

The match was played, with many interruptions for rain, over three days on a pitch that made batting nearly impossible. The low-scoring contest was punctuated by several tactical declarations, and changes in each side's normal batting order. Hylton performed well with both ball and bat; he took 3 wickets for 8 in England's first innings (his victims were Hammond, Jim Smith and Errol Holmes) and was the West Indies' top scorer (with 19 runs) in the side's second innings. England eventually won the match by four wickets; at one point, set a target of only 73, they looked likely losers with six wickets down for 48, but they were rescued by some robust batting from Hammond.

The fact remained, however, that [England's] batting was generally at fault, breaking down badly against the concentrated attack of fast bowling represented by Martindale, Constantine and Hylton, a combination described by Wyatt himself as the best of its kind in the world.

— Wisden 1936: Tour report

Hylton kept his place in the side for the whole four-match series. In the second Test, played at Port of Spain, Trinidad from 24 January, West Indies gained a comfortable victory; Hylton's bowling figures were 2 for 55 and 3 for 25. The third match, at Georgetown, British Guiana, was a rain-affected draw, although in the England first innings Hylton achieved his best Test bowling analysis: 13.2 overs, 4 maidens, 27 runs, 4 wickets. The final Test was played at Hylton's home ground, Sabina Park – his only Test appearance there. He made little personal impact on the match, taking no wickets, but West Indies won easily, by an innings and 161 runs, and thus took the series by two matches to one – their first Test series victory. The contribution of the pace trio of Learie Constantine, Manny Martindale and Hylton to the series triumph was considerable; Manley writes that the three "brought the first unalloyed joy to the cricket community of the Caribbean". Hylton's personal bowling tally for the series was 13 wickets for an average of 19.30.

The West Indies played no further Tests for four years. In first-class cricket, Hylton played in three matches against a visiting Yorkshire side in 1936, in the third game excelling as a batsman by scoring 80, his highest first-class score. Early in 1939 Hylton played well in two trial matches, designed to assist selection for that summer's tour of England. When the 15-man party was announced, Hylton's name was not included.

=== England tour, 1939 ===
Hylton's omission from the 1939 touring party caused a storm of protest in the Jamaican press. Particular anger was directed at what was perceived as the excessive influence of the Queen's Park Club in Trinidad, and the selection of the 18-year-old Trinidadian novice batsman Jeff Stollmeyer, apparently in preference to Hylton. The chief cricket correspondent of the Daily Gleaner suggested that the four Jamaicans in the party should all withdraw in protest, a view supported by many letters to the paper. It emerged that one factor behind Hylton's omission was financial; the impoverished West Indies Cricket Board could not afford the cost of another player in the party. Led by the Daily Gleaner, a campaign began in Jamaica to raise the funds that would support Hylton on the tour. The Board relented, and Hylton was belatedly added to the touring party.

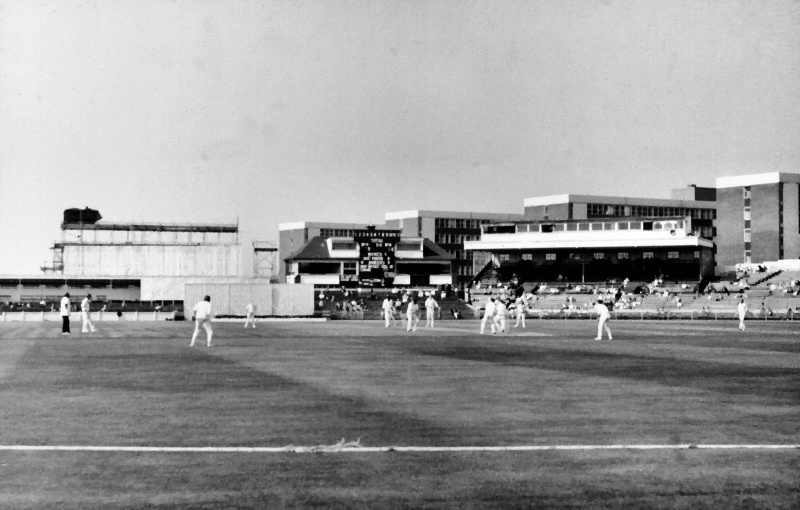
Old Trafford, Manchester, where Hylton played the last of his six Test matches (the ground has since been completely redeveloped)

Hylton began the tour well; after seeing him in action against Lancashire in May, the Manchester Guardian's cricket correspondent Neville Cardus observed: "Hylton is unmistakably a good bowler, possibly more than good". However, he was now 34, and his powers were waning. During the tour he played a total of 15 first-class matches, in which he took 39 wickets for an average of 27.71, and scored 215 runs, av. 14.33. He rarely found the form of 1934–35, and did nothing of note in either of the two Test matches in which he played, other than getting Hutton's wicket in both innings at Lord's. In these Tests he took three wickets for an average of 55.66, and scored a total of 17 runs in three innings with the bat. He was not selected for the last game of the three-match series. Wisden wrote of his performance in the Tests: "Hylton, a deadly bowler in conjunction with Martindale and Constantine when Wyatt's team were beaten, could not find his form". His best match of the tour was the game against Northamptonshire, when he took five cheap wickets and then scored an aggressive 55 runs. West Indies lost the first Test, and the following two were drawn. The tour ended prematurely when, in view of the worsening international situation, the West Indies team sailed for home immediately on the conclusion of the final Test, abandoning several end-of-season fixtures. (Note: The decision to cut the tour short, opposed by many of the players, was fortunate. Had the party waited longer, their passage home would have been on the SS Athenia, sunk by a U-boat on 3 September 1939, Britain's first shipping loss of the war.)

On his arrival home, Hylton announced his retirement from representative cricket. In his six Tests he scored 70 runs with the bat, average 11.66, and as a bowler he took 16 wickets, averaging 26.12. In his whole first-class career of 40 matches he scored 843 runs, average 18.73, and took 120 wickets at 25.62. He also held 31 catches.

== Post-cricket ==
=== Marriage and domestic life ===
Hylton's status as an international cricketer helped him, on his return home, to get a better-paid job, with the Rehabilitation Department of the Jamaican Civil Service. In 1940 he met and began courting Lurline Rose, the daughter of a police inspector. In the racially-conscious and class-ridden Jamaican society, Hylton ranked well below the Roses in terms of education and social standing. Despite his cricketing fame, Lurline's parents vehemently opposed the match, but their objections were overridden and the couple married in 1942. The marriage seemed a happy one, and a son was born in 1947. Lurline Hylton was ambitious, and wanted to be a fashion designer; this involved spending lengthy periods of time away from home, training in New York fashion schools. To accommodate this, in 1951 the Hyltons moved into the Roses’ home, so that Lurline's mother could take over childcare duties during her absences (her father had by this time died). Hylton's relations with his mother-in-law were uneasy, but otherwise the arrangement appeared to work.

Although his playing days were over, Hylton remained a respected figure in Jamaica cricketing circles. Jeff Stollmeyer, who had toured England with Hylton in 1939 and became the West Indies captain in the early 1950s, refers to Hylton as "a studious cricketer and one with whom I spent many hours in the late forties and early fifties watching and learning". Stollmeyer describes Hylton as a commanding personality, but with a fiery temper that had led him into trouble with the cricket authorities on more than one occasion during his career.

In mid-April 1954 Hylton received from New York an unsigned letter, informing him that his wife was engaged in an adulterous relationship with one Roy Francis, by repute a notorious womaniser. Greatly disturbed, Hylton consulted his family before sending Lurline a curt telegram demanding that she return home immediately. She replied in emollient fashion: "Don't worry, all will be well. Love from your wife", and booked her flight home. On arrival in Jamaica on 2 May, she denied any affair with Francis, who she said was a mere casual acquaintance. After an initially tense reunion, it appears that Hylton accepted her word and the pair were, at least temporarily, reconciled.

On the day before Lurline's return from New York, Hylton purchased a quantity of revolver cartridges. His explanation was that he kept the gun for security purposes; there had been recent burglaries and other criminal activity in the area of the family home, and he was concerned that his ammunition supplies were running low.

=== Shooting ===
Despite the outward cordiality, Hylton remained suspicious. On 5 May he learned that the Roses' garden helper had taken a letter from Lurline to the local post office. Believing that this was to be posted to Francis in New York, Hylton went to the postmistress and demanded to see the letter, but was told that this was impossible. In the early hours of the following morning he challenged Lurline, implying that he knew she had written to Francis and claiming, falsely, that he would be allowed to read the letter later that day.

Any account of what followed immediately after this confrontation is based on Hylton's own testimony. According to him, she admitted the affair with Francis, and then taunted her husband, saying she should have followed her parents' advice that he was not of her class. She continued: "I have found the man I love, you cannot stand in my way. Yes, I have slept with him ... My body belongs to him." At this point, Hylton claimed, Lurline grabbed the revolver that was in the bedroom, and attempted to shoot him, but the gun misfired. A struggle followed during which, he said, he could see only the image of his wife with her lover. "Suddenly I saw blood. Blood all over, and I realised that I had shot my wife."

In the shocked aftermath, nobody thought to call for medical assistance. It is unclear whether immediate medical attention could have saved Lurline's life; she was suffering from multiple bullet wounds and died not long after the attack. Hylton himself called the police, who failed to caution him as he gave an incoherent, self-incriminatory account of the night's events before being taken into custody.

=== Trial, verdict, sentence ===
The trial was scheduled for October 1954. Hylton was represented by Vivian Blake, one of the island's most prominent counsel. Blake was briefed by Hylton's solicitor, Noel Nethersole, who had been Jamaica's cricket captain in the 1930s and was a prominent West Indies Cricket Board member. It is likely that both Blake and Nethersole worked pro bono, as Hylton could not have afforded their fees. The chief prosecution counsel was Harvey DaCosta, a future West Indies Federation attorney-general, and the trial judge was Justice Colin MacGregor, later the island's Chief Justice. MacGregor had a reputation for severity, particularly towards working-class defendants. The case attracted considerable public attention, and noisy crowds gathered at the courthouse on each day of the trial, showing partiality to Hylton by cheering at each appearance of his defence team.

"You brute! After all these years, I have wasted my life with you, and now that I have found the man I love; you cannot stand in my way. He has given me joy what I have never known with you. I want to bear his children. Yes, I have slept with him. I never felt like that before. My body belongs to him. I am Roy's, Roy's, Roy's!"

— Lurline Hylton's alleged words to her husband, according to a trial report.

Since it was beyond contention that Hylton had fired the fatal shots, the only conceivable defence was that of provocation, that had driven him to an act of passion. If Blake could show that Hylton was unreasonably provoked by his wife's behaviour, and had acted without premeditation, he might be convicted of manslaughter rather than capital murder. Under Blake's direction, Hylton provided the court with a vivid reconstruction of the bedroom scene in the early hours of 6 May which, the prosecution suggested, was a fabrication. However, as corroborative evidence for Hylton's version, Blake produced the letter which Hylton had tried to intercept, in which the deceased explicitly expressed her love for Francis and a hatred and contempt for her husband.

The most damaging evidence against Hylton was the prosecution's revelation that Lurline's body had seven bullet wounds, meaning that at some point Hylton must have reloaded the six-shooter – this indicated calculation, rather than an act of blind rage. Hylton claimed that he reloaded intending to commit suicide, but this did not explain the number of wounds in his wife's body. In a hostile summing-up, MacGregor told the jury that Lurline's verbal abuse did not amount to sufficient provocation in law. He also dismissed the significance of the failure to caution Hylton before the arrest, and allowed his confused and self-incriminating initial statements to stand as evidence.

The trial ended on 20 October 1954. The jury was initially unable to reach a verdict, but after being reminded by MacGregor of the "great public inconvenience and expense" of a delayed decision, they retired again, and returned just over an hour later with a "guilty" verdict, adding a strong recommendation for mercy. MacGregor was unmoved, and sentenced Hylton to death by hanging.

=== Appeals, petitions, execution ===
An appeal against the verdict was dismissed in January 1955, by Jamaica's Supreme Court. The court considered that Hylton's response to the provocation he suffered was "entirely disproportionate", and confirmed his conviction and sentence. His lawyers then sought leave to appeal to the Privy Council in London, but on 21 April Hylton learned that leave had been refused. His one remaining hope was that Jamaica's colonial governor, Sir Hugh Foot, would grant a reprieve, and a petition requesting clemency was arranged, supported by many of the colony's leading citizens. On 9 May the governor rejected the petition, and announced that the execution would take place on 17 May.

Hylton appeared to accept his fate with a stoical dignity and calm. In his last weeks he was received into the Roman Catholic Church. Shortly before the execution he was visited in the death cell by his former playing colleague Stollmeyer, who described Hylton as dressed in a white gown and looking like a high priest. "It seemed a great shame that one so powerful and vital should have to pay the full penalty, but his temper had let him down for the last time". On the morning of 17 May, large crowds held a silent vigil outside St Catherine District prison. Hylton was hanged, after refusing the traditional last breakfast, and his body buried within the prison compound.

The previous day, in Barbados, the West Indies were playing in a Test match against Australia. One of the Jamaicans in the side, J.K. Holt, was having a difficult time in the field, dropping several catches. With what the cricket writer and commentator Tony Cozier describes as "a ghoulish sense of humour", spectators displayed a banner reading "Hang Holt, Save Hylton".

== Aftermath ==
Hylton's international cricket career was brief, its main impact confined to a single Test series, but was sufficient for later commentators to describe his combination with Constantine and Martindale as a forerunner of the great West Indies pace partnerships of the 1970s and 1980s. In general, however, the cricket world chose to erase Hylton from its collective memory. Little if anything of his career was published in cricket histories. A brief obituary appeared in the 1956 Wisden, but gave no details as to the manner of his death; only many years later, an addendum recorded that he was executed for murder. C.L.R. James, the Trinidadian historian who wrote much about cricket and socio-political issues, said nothing about Hylton, while Michael Manley, in his comprehensive 1988 History of West Indies Cricket, refers to "Leslie Hylton, that fine but ill-fated Jamaican fast bowler", without providing further explanation. Learie Constantine made no reference to Hylton in his various cricket writings; of Hylton's playing contemporaries, only Stollmeyer provides a brief pen picture.

Two years after Hylton's death, the law in Jamaica relating to provocation was changed, so that determining what was sufficient to establish a defence became a matter for the jury rather than a judge's direction. Had that law existed in Hylton's time, it might have saved him. Whitaker sums up Hylton's fate thus: "Leslie Hylton, in his treatment by cricket's hierarchy, and the unforgiving punishment for a crime of passion, was seen by many as a symbol of how hard, and perhaps how unfair, life could be for those born into the poverty of Jamaica's working class".

Capital punishment remains legal in Jamaica. However, it has not been carried out since 1988, when a moratorium suspended its operation for 20 years. When the moratorium expired the Jamaican parliament voted to retain the death penalty, but it has remained unused as at early 2019.

== Notes and references ==
=== Sources ===
==== Books ====
- Donnelley, Paul (2010). Firsts, Lasts and Onlys of Cricket. London: Hatchette UK. ISBN 978-0-60062-253-6.
- Edwards, Alan (2001). Lionel Tennyson: Regency Buck. London: Robson Books. ISBN 978-1-86105-390-9.
- Frindall, Bill (1979). The Wisden Book of Test Cricket 1876–77 to 1977–78. London: Book Club Associates.
- Ledbetter, Jim; Wynne-Jones, Peter (1991). First-Class Cricket: A Complete Record 1939. Derby: Breedon Books. ISBN 978-0-90796-972-3.
- Manley, Michael (1990). A History of West Indies Cricket. London: Pan Books. ISBN 978-0-33030-013-1.
- Marqusee, Mike (1998). Anyone but England: Cricket, Race and Class. London: Two Heads Publishing. ISBN 978-1-89785-043-5.
- Stollmeyer, Jeff (1983). Everything Under the Sun. London: Stanley Paul. ISBN 978-0-09152-420-3.

==== Newspapers and magazines ====
- Abrahams, Michael (16 May 2016). "The Death Penalty Is Not The Answer". The Jamaica Gleaner.
- "Biographical notes". Caribbean Quarterly. 6 (2/3): 236–239. May 1960. doi:10.1080/00086495.1960.11829813. JSTOR 40652768. (subscription required)
- Browne, Richard (12 February 2012). "The Hanging Cricketer". The Sunday Leader (Sri Lanka). Archived from the original on 12 June 2018.
- Cardus, Neville (11 May 1939). "West Indies Trouble Lancashire". The Manchester Guardian. p. 4. ProQuest 484621350. (subscription required)
- Cozier, Tony (9 July 1997). "Obituary: J. K. Holt". The Independent.
- Hibbert, Sybil (22 July 2012). "A Crime of Passion". Jamaica Observer.
- "Hylton To Die for Wife Murder". The Manchester Guardian. 9 May 1955. p. 7. ProQuest 479738437. (subscription required)
- Thompson, Kimone (5 August 2012). "Proud to be Jamaican". Jamaica Observer.
- Whitaker, Mark (Autumn 2015). "No Brief Stay of Execution" (PDF). The Nightwatchman (11). Archived from the original (PDF) on 12 June 2018.

==== Online ====
- "Cornell Center on the Death Penalty Worldwide: Jamaica". Cornell Law School. Archived from the original on 31 May 2018.
- "History of MCC". The Marylebone Cricket Club. Archived from the original on 12 June 2018.
- "Leslie Hylton, West Indies". Cricinfo.
- "Leslie Hylton: Wisden obituary". Cricinfo. (Reproduced from Wisden Cricketers' Almanack 1956)
- "LH Tennyson's XI in Jamaica, 1927–28". Cricinfo.
- "MCC Team in the West Indies, 1934–35: Wisden report". Cricinfo. (Reproduced from Wisden Cricketers' Almanack 1956)
- Sengupta, Arunabha (16 May 2016). "Leslie Hylton: Only Test cricketer to be hanged". Cricket Country.
- "The West Indian team in England 1939: Wisden report". Cricinfo. (Reproduced from Wisden Cricketers' Almanack 1940)
- "Tour directory: Yorkshire in Jamaica, 1935–36". Cricinfo.
- Tregaskis (2015). "Thirteen steps to perdition – the tragic story of Leslie Hylton". DropInPitch. (Republished from original article in The Cricketer, March 2015)
- "The Untold Story of Leslie Hylton: The Only Test Cricketer to Be Hanged". By Yasser Usman Yasser_Usman. Cricketnmore.

==== Scorecards ====
- "Jamaica v LH Tennyson's XI 1926–27: Match 1". Cricinfo.
- "Jamaica v LH Tennyson's XI 1926–27: Match 2". Cricinfo.
- "Barbados and Jamaica v Combined Trinidad and British Guiana, 1927/28". Cricinfo.
- "Sir Julien Cahn's XI in Jamaica, 1928/29: Jamaica v Sir Julien Cahn's XI". Cricinfo.
- "Marylebone Cricket Club in West Indies, 1929/30: Jamaica v. MCC". Cricinfo.
