= Ralph Legall =

West Indian cricketer

Personal information
- Full name: Ralph Archibald Legall
- Born: 1 December 1925; St Michael, Barbados
- Died: February 2003 (aged 77)
- Batting: Right-handed
- Role: Wicketkeeper-batsman

International information
- National side: West Indies
- Test debut: 7 February 1953 v India
- Last Test: 28 March 1953 v India

Career statistics
Competition	Tests	First-class
Matches	4	16
Runs scored	50	485
Batting average	10.00	22.04
100s/50s	0/0	0/2
Top score	23	68
Catches/stumpings	8/1	32/10
- Source: Cricinfo, 27 July 2024

Ralph Archibald Legall (1 December 1925 – 2003) was a West Indian cricketer who played in four Tests in 1953.

Legall played as a wicket-keeper and middle-order batsman for Trinidad from 1946–47 to 1957–58. His highest score was 68, the top score in Trinidad's first innings of their victory over Jamaica in 1954–55. He replaced Alfred Binns as the West Indies wicket-keeper after the First Test against India in 1952-53 and played the last four Tests of the series.

In 1960 he played for Church in the Lancashire League. He then went to Canada.

Legall also played Davis Cup tennis: for the British Caribbean team against the US and Canada in 1954 and 1956. He is one of only two people to play both Test cricket and Davis Cup tennis. The other is Cotah Ramaswami of India. By a coincidence, Ramaswami managed the Indian team against which Legall played his Test matches.

There is mystery surrounding Legall's death: he is variously reported to have died in Toronto, New York state or Trinidad, and probably in February 2003.
