= James Neblett =

West Indian cricketer (1901–1959)

Cricket information
- Batting: Right-handed
- Bowling: Right-arm legbreak

International information
- National side: West Indies
- Only Test (cap 42): 14 February 1935 v England

Career statistics
Competition	Test	First-class
Matches	1	20
Runs scored	16	526
Batting average	16.00	18.78
100s/50s	0/0	0/2
Top score	11*	61
Balls bowled	216	2,535
Wickets	1	29
Bowling average	75.00	41.55
5 wickets in innings	0	0
10 wickets in match	0	0
Best bowling	1/44	4/82
Catches/stumpings	0/–	16/–
- Source: CricInfo, 30 October 2022

James Montague Neblett (13 November 1901 - 28 March 1959) was a cricketer who played one Test match for West Indies in 1935.

Born in Taylor's Land, St. Michael in Barbados, Neblett was a middle-order batsman and a leg-break bowler who spent his domestic career playing for British Guiana during the 1920s and 1930s. His first three first-class matches were all played against the touring M.C.C. at Bourda, Georgetown in February, 1926. He performed moderately well, for whilst he did nothing of note with the bat, he took three wickets in each match for a total of 216 runs.

Neblett toured England with the West Indies in 1928 under the captaincy of R.K. Nunes, the first official West Indian tour of England, but played in only eight of the first-class matches, none of which were in the three-match Test series. Against Cambridge University Cricket Club in a match played at Fenner's, he surpassed his previous top score of 59 when scoring 61 in West Indies' first innings. But on no other occasion in his career did he go past fifty runs in an innings.

After a five-year break from senior cricket, Neblett's sole Test appearance was due to West Indies' policy of playing "home" players in an effort to keep expenses down. Playing against an England team led by Bob Wyatt at Bourda in February 1935, Neblett scored 11 not out and five, and took 1/75 with the ball. Neblett also once represented a "Barbados-born" team against the rest of West Indies, where he recorded his best bowling figures of four wickets for 82.

Neblett died in Mackenzie, British Guiana, aged 57. He did not receive an obituary in Wisden Cricketers' Almanack.
