= George Paine (cricketer) =

English cricketer

Personal information
- Born: 11 June 1908; Paddington, London, England
- Died: 30 March 1978 (aged 69); Warwickshire, England
- Batting: Right-handed
- Bowling: Slow left-arm orthodox

International information
- National side: England
- Test debut (cap 280): 8 January 1935 v West Indies
- Last Test: 14 March 1935 v West Indies

Career statistics
Competition	Test	First-class
Matches	4	258
Runs scored	97	3,430
Batting average	16.16	11.95
100s/50s	0/0	0/7
Top score	49	79
Balls bowled	1,044	59,046
Wickets	17	1,021
Bowling average	27.47	22.85
5 wickets in innings	1	74
10 wickets in match	0	13
Best bowling	5/168	8/43
Catches/stumpings	5/–	160/–
- Source: CricInfo, 7 November 2022

George Alfred Edward Paine (11 June 1908 – 30 March 1978) was an English cricketer who played in four Test matches in 1934–35.

A tall lower-order right-handed batsman and an orthodox left-arm spinner, Paine played in five first-class matches for Middlesex in 1926, but then qualified by residence to play for Warwickshire, making his debut in 1929.

Inclined in his first two seasons to be expensive, he developed in 1931 into a top-class spinner, adding extra flight and spin to his delivery. He took 127 wickets in that season and passed the 100 wickets mark in each of the next five seasons, with a best performance of 156 wickets in 1934, when he was top of the first-class averages. He was picked as a Wisden Cricketer of the Year in the 1935 edition of Wisden Cricketers' Almanack.

In 1934–35, he was chosen, with his county colleague Eric Hollies, for the Marylebone Cricket Club (MCC) tour of the West Indies and there he played his only Test matches. He took more wickets, 17, than any other England bowler and also hit the highest score, 49, in England's innings of 226 in the third Test match, having been sent in as a nightwatchman. But the tour as a whole was not a success, with the West Indies winning the four-match series by two to one, and Paine was not picked for any further Test matches.

In fact, in 1935, though he still took more than 100 wickets, Paine was much less effective for Warwickshire; Wisden for 1936 says that he "suffered from physical trouble", which appears to have been rheumatism, and that he had lost much of the flight and spin that had made him a force since 1931. He was ill for much of 1936, back but out of form in 1937 and after another ineffective season in 1938, he refused the terms Warwickshire offered for 1939 and left first-class cricket, though he reappeared in one match in 1947.

In retirement he was a coach at Solihull School.
