= Charles Jones (West Indian cricketer) =

West Indian cricketer (1902–1959)

Cricket information
- Batting: Left-handed
- Bowling: Slow left-arm orthodox

International information
- National side: West Indies
- Test debut (cap 25): 21 February 1930 v England
- Last Test: 14 February 1935 v England

Career statistics
Competition	Test	First-class
Matches	4	27
Runs scored	63	917
Batting average	9.00	21.83
100s/50s	0/0	0/5
Top score	19	89*
Balls bowled	102	2,431
Wickets	0	24
Bowling average	–	44.12
5 wickets in innings	–	0
10 wickets in match	–	0
Best bowling	–	3/19
Catches/stumpings	3/–	22/–
- Source: CricInfo, 10 September 2022

Charles Ernest Llewellyn Jones (3 November 1902 – 10 December 1959) was a cricketer who played four Test matches for West Indies in the 1930s.

Born in Georgetown, British Guiana, Jones was a left-handed batsman and a slow left-arm bowler who made his first-class debut in October 1925 in the Inter-Colonial match against Barbados, scoring 14 runs and taking one wicket as British Guiana won by eight wickets.

In 1930, when the MCC visited the Caribbean under the leadership of F.S.G. Calthorpe, Jones played against them three times in February, twice for British Guiana and once whilst making his Test Match debut. His selection for the 3rd Test of the four-match series, played at Bourda, Georgetown was more to do with the West Indies’ usual policy of using a few players from the host island in an effort to keep the expenses down. In an historic victory over England, Jones' contribution was minimal, scoring just 6 and 2, taking two catches but failing to take a wicket with the ball. He played only occasionally for the next five years but aided by some useful scores with the bat in that time, Jones made a further three Test appearances against England sides led by R.E.S. Wyatt in 1935. In the second Test of the series, played at Port-of-Spain, Trinidad, and where he opened with C.M. Christiani, he scored 19 runs in both innings. This subsequently proved to be his highest Test score but he failed to take a single Test wicket in his career. In all first-class matches he took 24 wickets at an average of 44.12 apiece and scored 917 runs at an average of 21.83. In a career that ended in January 1939, his highest score was an unbeaten 89, scored at home in a comprehensive victory over Barbados. No Obituary appeared within the pages of Wisden for Jones.
