= J. G. Blackman =

West Indian cricket umpire

Umpiring information
- Tests umpired: 1 (1935)
- Source: Cricinfo, 1 July 2013

J. G. Blackman was a West Indian cricket umpire. He stood in one Test match, West Indies vs. England, in 1935, when his umpiring partner was Arthur Richardson, the former Australian Test player. He umpired five first-class matches, all at the Bourda ground in Georgetown, British Guiana, between 1934 and 1938.
