= Cyril Christiani =

West Indian cricketer (1913–1938)

Personal information
- Full name: Cyril Marcel Christiani
- Born: 28 October 1913; Georgetown, British Guiana
- Died: 4 April 1938 (aged 24); Georgetown, British Guiana
- Batting: Right-handed
- Role: Wicket-keeper
- Relatives: Robert Christiani (brother)

International information
- National side: West Indies
- Test debut (cap 38): 8 January 1935 v England
- Last Test: 14 March 1935 v England

Career statistics
Competition	Test	First-class
Matches	4	28
Runs scored	98	658
Batting average	19.60	16.45
100s/50s	0/0	0/1
Top score	32*	79
Balls bowled	0	6
Wickets	–	0
Bowling average	–	–
5 wickets in innings	–	–
10 wickets in match	–	–
Best bowling	–	–
Catches/stumpings	6/1	44/20
- Source: CricInfo, 15 October 2020

Cyril Marcel Christiani (28 October 1913 – 4 April 1938) was a West Indian cricketer who played in four Test matches against England in 1934–35. A wicket-keeper, he appeared for British Guiana between 1931/32 and 1937/38. He died of malaria at the age of 24.

== Career ==
Christiani was born in Georgetown on 28 October 1913. The eldest of four brothers who played first-class cricket for British Guiana, one of whom was the Test cricketer Robert Christiani.

Christiani made his first-class debut for British Guiana against Trinidad during the 1931/32 Inter-Colonial Tournament. This was his only major match before Test trials in early 1933 earned him selection for the West Indies tour of England later that year. Aged 19, he was chosen as understudy wicket-keeper to Ivan Barrow and was the only British Guianan member of the touring party. Christiani did not feature in the Test matches but played 13 of the first-class tour matches completing 31 dismissals.

For the 1934–35 series against England, Christiani was West Indies wicket-keeper in all four Tests with Barrow initially unavailable. Christiani made his Test debut on a rain-affected pitch at Kensington Oval managing scores of 11 not out and 9. He opened the batting on four occasions during the series, achieving his Test best of 32 not out in the third Test from this position. Barrow returned to the team for the fourth Test but Christiani retained the gloves. He contributed seven dismissals across the four Tests as West Indies secured a first series victory over England. Tall and slight, his agility and reflexes enabled him to regular stand up to fast bowlers.

Christiani made his only first-class fifty in the 1936/37 Inter-Colonial Tournament final against Trinidad, but scores of 34 and 79 could not prevent his side from losing. He made his last first-class appearance as British Guaina regained the championship from Trinidad in October 1937.

Christiani died on 4 April 1938 of malaria, at the age of 24. He is the youngest West Indian Test cricketer to have died.
