= Alfred Binns =

West Indian cricketer (1929–2017)

Alfie Binns
Personal information
- Full name: Alfred Philip Binns
- Born: 24 July 1929; Kingston, Jamaica
- Died: 29 December 2017 (aged 88); Weston, Florida, U.S.
- Height: 5 ft 8 in (1.73 m)
- Batting: Right-handed
- Role: Wicket-keeper-batsman

International information
- National side: West Indies
- Test debut (cap 74): 21 January 1953 v India
- Last Test: 9 March 1956 v New Zealand

Career statistics
Competition	Tests	First-class
Matches	5	25
Runs scored	64	1,446
Batting average	9.14	37.07
100s/50s	0/0	4/4
Top score	27	157
Catches/stumpings	14/3	48/17
- Source: Cricinfo, 8 November 2018

Alfred Philip Binns (24 July 1929 – 29 December 2017) was a West Indian cricketer from Jamaica who played in five Tests between 1953 and 1956. He played as wicketkeeper in all five Tests.

== Career ==
Binns was born in Kingston, Jamaica, and attended St. George's College. He represented Jamaica in first-class cricket from 1950 to 1957. His highest score was 157 against British Guiana in 1952–53. He also scored 151 for Jamaica against the Australians in 1954–55, when he and Collie Smith added 277 for the sixth wicket in 230 minutes after Jamaica had been 81 for 5. He toured New Zealand in 1955-56, playing in three of the four Tests.

In the 1956–57 season, playing for Jamaica against British Guiana, Binns became the first batsmen since John King in 1906 to be given out hit the ball twice in a first-class game. He remains the only batsmen ever given out this way in West Indian first-class cricket, and the last outside of the Indian subcontinent.

After his cricket career, Binns migrated to the United States, where he graduated from Northeastern University in Boston and worked as a teacher in Massachusetts. He married Henrietta Elizabeth Harrison in Boston in 1959, and they had two daughters. They retired to Florida in 1985. Binns died in Florida in December 2017 at the age of 88.
