= Derek Sealy =

Barbadian cricketer (1912–1982)

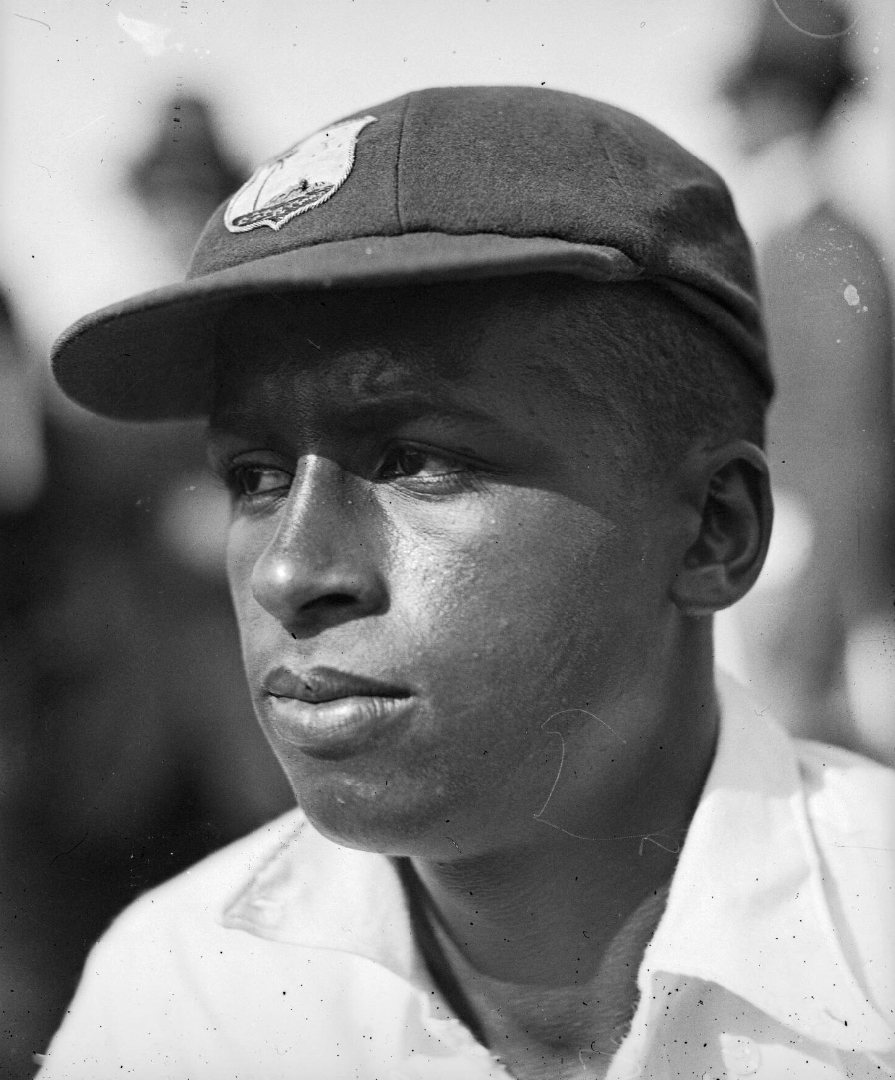

Personal information
- Full name: James Edward Derrick Sealy
- Born: 11 September 1912; Collymore Rock, Saint Michael, Barbados
- Died: 3 January 1982 (aged 69); Palo Seco, Trinidad and Tobago
- Batting: Right-handed
- Bowling: Right-arm medium pace
- Role: Occasional wicket-keeper

International information
- National side: West Indies
- Test debut (cap 20): 11 January 1930 v England
- Last Test: 19 August 1939 v England

Domestic team information
- Years: Team
- 1928–1943: Barbados
- 1935–1949: Trinidad

Career statistics
Competition	Tests	First-class
Matches	11	80
Runs scored	478	3,831
Batting average	28.11	30.40
100s/50s	0/3	8/16
Top score	92	181
Balls bowled	156	3,932
Wickets	3	63
Bowling average	31.33	28.60
5 wickets in innings	0	2
10 wickets in match	0	1
Best bowling	2/7	8/8
Catches/stumpings	6/1	67/13
- Source: Cricket Archive, 27 October 2010

James Edward Derrick Sealy (11 September 1912 – 3 January 1982) was a Barbadian cricketer who played in 11 Tests for West Indies from 1930 to 1939.

He made his Test debut at 17 years 122 days, and remains the youngest West Indian Test player.

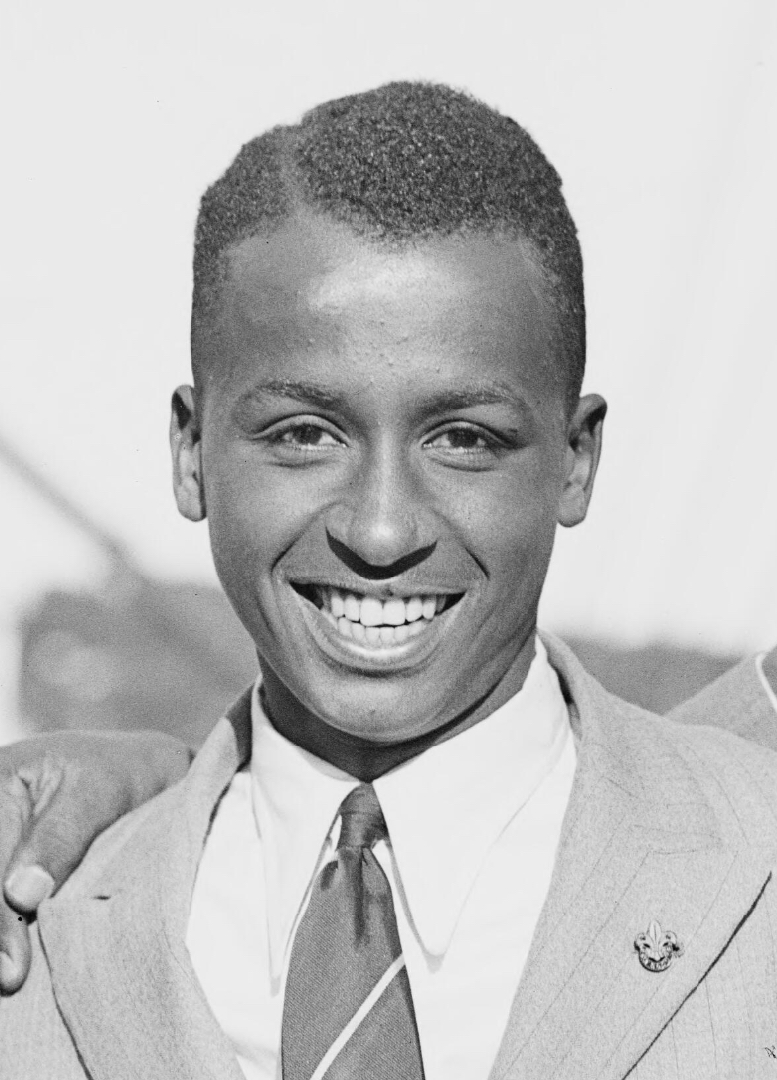
Sealy on the West Indies' 1930–31 tour of Australia

undated photo

He played for Barbados from 1928–29 to 1942–43, and for Trinidad from 1943–44 to 1948–49. In 1942, playing for Barbados against Trinidad, he took 8 for 8, dismissing Trinidad for 16.
