= Ivan Barrow =

Jamaican cricketer

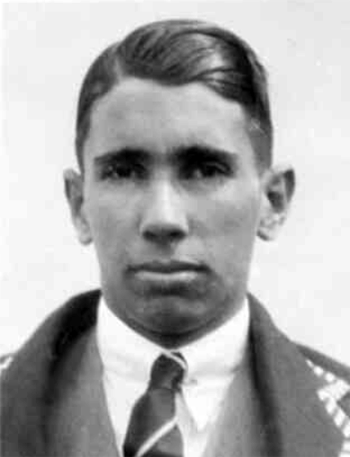
- Barrow in 1930

Personal information
- Full name: Ivanhoe Mordecai Barrow
- Born: 6 January 1911; Morant Bay, Jamaica
- Died: 2 April 1979 (aged 68); Kingston, Jamaica
- Batting: Right-handed
- Role: Wicket-keeper

International information
- National side: West Indies
- Test debut (cap 26): 3 April 1930 v England
- Last Test: 24 June 1939 v England

Domestic team information
- Years: Team
- 1928–1946: Jamaica

Career statistics
Competition	Test	First-class
Matches	11	68
Runs scored	276	2,551
Batting average	16.23	23.84
100s/50s	1/0	3/10
Top score	105	169
Balls bowled	0	54
Wickets	–	0
Bowling average	–	–
5 wickets in innings	–	0
10 wickets in match	–	0
Best bowling	–	–
Catches/stumpings	17/5	73/27
- Source: CricketArchive, 10 February 2011

Ivanhoe Mordecai Barrow (6 January 1911 – 2 April 1979) was a Jamaican cricketer who played 11 Tests for the West Indies in the 1930s.

== Life and career ==
Barrow was born on 6 January 1911 in Morant Bay, Jamaica, to Hyam and Mamie Barrow, two Sephardic Jews, a twin to Frank Norton Barrow. He attended Wolmer's Schools in Kingston.

A wicket-keeper and opening batsman, Barrow was the first West Indian to score a century in a Test match in England, which he did at Old Trafford in 1933. He also toured Australia and New Zealand during the 1930–31 season, and England again in 1939. In Adelaide in 1930, he became the first batsman to be dismissed by Don Bradman in Test cricket. Bradman took only one other Test wicket, that of Wally Hammond in 1933.

Barrow played first-class cricket for Jamaica from 1929 to 1939, with one final match in 1946. His most successful match was for Jamaica against the touring Lord Tennyson's XI in March 1932, when he made 169 and 58 not out and Jamaica won by four wickets.

Barrow was one of the most notable Jews in Jamaica, and as of 2010 was the only Jewish cricketer to have scored a century in a Test. He died in Kingston in 1979.
