= Ivor Mendonca =

Guyanese cricketer (1934–2014)

Personal information
- Full name: Leon Ivor Mendonca
- Born: 13 July 1934; Bartica, British Guiana
- Died: 14 June 2014 (aged 79); Georgetown, Guyana
- Batting: Right-handed
- Role: Wicket-keeper

International information
- National side: West Indies
- Test debut: 7 March 1962 v India
- Last Test: 4 April 1962 v India

Career statistics
Competition	Test	First-class
Matches	2	10
Runs scored	81	407
Batting average	40.50	31.30
100s/50s	0/1	0/3
Top score	78	78
Catches/stumpings	8/2	25/5
- Source: CricInfo, 30 October 2022

Leon Ivor Mendonca (13 July 1934 – 14 June 2014) was a Guyanese cricketer who played in two Test matches in 1962.

== Career ==
A wicket-keeper and useful batsman, he played for British Guiana from 1958–59 to 1961–62. On his first-class debut against Barbados he opened the batting and scored 74 and 27, and in his second match, also against Barbados, he made 5 and 69. He later batted down the order.

He made his Test debut against India in the Second Test at Kingston in 1961–62, when batting at number eight he made 78, his highest first-class score, adding 127 for the seventh wicket with Gary Sobers and 74 for the eighth wicket with Charlie Stayers.

He lost his place to David Allan for the Third Test, returned for the Fourth, then was replaced by Allan again for the Fifth. The Fourth Test was his last first-class match.

== Personal life ==
Mendonca was born in Bartica, British Guiana. His parents were Ineas Mendonca and Osmond Mendonca. Ivor Mendonca was the oldest of 10 brothers and sisters. He suffered cancer of the larynx and prostate and died in 2014.

He was the uncle of English footballer Clive Mendonca.
