= The West Indies Cricket Annual =

Cricket annual

West Indies Cricket Annual 1970

The West Indies Cricket Annual was a cricket annual published from 1970 to 1991 which covered cricket in the West Indies and by West Indian teams overseas. It was the first annual to cover all aspects of West Indies cricket in detail. All 22 editions were edited by Tony Cozier. Most of the photographs taken by cricket journalist Gordon Brooks have featured in the magazine.

It was generally A4 size although the height varied a little over the years. Most editions were 88 pages although this varied from 84 to 96 pages. The exception was the 1972 edition which had only 68 pages.

From 1978 to 1982 and from 1984 to 1991 the publication was called The Benson & Hedges West Indies Cricket Annual.

It was succeeded by the Caribbean Cricket Quarterly.

== Typical contents ==
The content varied somewhat over the years but the typical contents are given below. A particular feature of the annual was the good coverage of West Indies cricket at below first-class level.

- Comment
- Five cricketers of the year
- General articles
- Touring teams in the West Indies
- Domestic cricket in the West Indies
- West Indian teams overseas
- Who's Who
- Obituaries

The Annual never included a records section.

== Five cricketers of the year ==
Each year five cricketers of the year were chosen based on performances in the West Indies and on West Indies tours overseas. The annual included a biography of the selections. Until 1981 a player was only chosen once (like the Wisden Cricketers of the Year) but in that year Viv Richards was chosen for the second time and from 1983 the selection was made solely on merit. In 1987 only four players were chosen.

- 1970 : Arthur Barrett, Joey Carew, Roy Fredericks, Vanburn Holder, Alvin Kallicharran
- 1971 : Charlie Davis, Sunil Gavaskar, Dilip Sardesai, Gary Sobers, Venkat
- 1972 : Bev Congdon, David Holford, Lawrence Rowe, Bruce Taylor, Glenn Turner
- 1973 : Ian Chappell, Maurice Foster, Lance Gibbs, Max Walker, Doug Walters
- 1974 : Dennis Amiss, Keith Boyce, Tony Greig, Bernard Julien, Deryck Murray
- 1975 : Mike Findlay, Larry Gomes, Clive Lloyd, Viv Richards, Andy Roberts
- 1976 : Bishen Bedi, Prince Bartholomew, Bhagwat Chandrasekhar, Michael Holding, Irvine Shillingford
- 1977 : Colin Croft, Gordon Greenidge, Joel Garner, Majid Khan, Wasim Raja
- 1978 : Richard Austin, Derick Parry, Norbert Phillip, Jeff Thomson, Basil Williams
- 1979 : Faoud Bacchus, Greg Chappell, Dennis Lillee, Malcolm Marshall, Grayson Shillingford
- 1980 : Richard Gabriel, Desmond Haynes, David Murray, Collis King, Rangy Nanan
- 1981 : Geoff Boycott, David Gower, Graham Gooch, Harold Joseph, Viv Richards
- 1982 : Winston Davis, Joel Garner, Larry Gomes, Rangy Nanan, Norbert Phillip
- 1983 : Mohinder Amarnath, Clive Lloyd, Gus Logie, Thelston Payne, Andy Roberts
- 1984 : Allan Border, Joel Garner, Desmond Haynes, Richie Richardson, Malcolm Marshall
- 1985 : Clyde Butts, Larry Gomes, Gordon Greenidge, Ganesh Mahabir, Malcolm Marshall
- 1986 : Carlisle Best, Joel Garner, Desmond Haynes, Malcolm Marshall, Patrick Patterson
- 1987 : Clyde Butts, Gordon Greenidge, Roger Harper, Courtney Walsh
- 1988 : Curtly Ambrose, Jeff Dujon, Imran Khan, Javed Miandad, Viv Richards
- 1989 : Curtly Ambrose, Desmond Haynes, Malcolm Marshall, Delroy Morgan, Richie Richardson
- 1990 : Curtly Ambrose, Carlisle Best, Ian Bishop, Robert Haynes, Allan Lamb
- 1991 : Desmond Haynes, Brian Lara, Craig McDermott, Patrick Patterson, Richie Richardson

== Who's Who ==
From the 1973 edition a "West Indies Cricket Who's Who" was included. This included players who had represented the West Indies or one of the Territorial teams. Those who had only played in the Beaumont Cup (Texaco Cup) on Trinidad or the Jones Cup in Guyana were not included in the "Who's Who" even when these matches were first-class. Career figures were included in the "Who's Who".

== Obituaries ==
Initially the annual just contained occasional obituaries. The 1971 edition contained one of Learie Constantine and the 1972 edition one of Manny Martindale. There were 3 obituaries in the 1973 edition (Eric Inniss, Augustus Gregoire and Kenny Wishart) and none in the 1974 edition. From the 1975 edition the obituary section became a regular feature which gradually expanded over the years.
