= Dominica national cricket team =

Dominica

Personnel
- Captain: Liam Sebastien
- Coach: Mervin Thomas

Team information
- Colours: Blue, Yellow
- Home ground: Windsor Park

History
- Four Day wins: n/a
- WICB Cup wins: n/a
- Twenty20 wins: 0
- Official website: Dominica Cricket Association

The Dominica national cricket team represents the country of Dominica in cricket. The team is not a member of the International Cricket Council, but the Dominica Cricket Association is a member of the Windward Islands Cricket Board of Control, which itself is a member association of the West Indies Cricket Board, and players from Dominica generally represent the Windward Islands cricket team at domestic level and the West Indies at international level. Dominica has played as a separate entity in matches which held Twenty20 status, but has not appeared in first-class or List A cricket. The team's captain, as of December 2013, is Liam Sebastien.

== History ==
A Dominica cricket team first appeared in West Indian cricket in the 1912/13 Hesketh Bell Shield against Saint Kitts at the Antigua Recreation Ground. The team is next recorded playing twelve years later in the 1925/26 Hesketh Bell Shield, with Dominica playing in the Shield until 1932, later playing in the Cork Windward Islands Challenge Cup in 1938 and 1939. In 1930, Merril Anthony became the first recorded cricketer from Dominica to play first-class cricket when he appeared for British Guiana. There is a long gap between 1939 and Dominica's next recorded appearance, which came in the 1965 Windward Islands Tournament against Saint Kitts. By this time the Windward Islands were playing matches which held first-class status, with Windsor Park playing host to the team's fourth first-class fixture in 1965 against the Leeward Islands. Dominica continued to play in the Windward Islands Tournament, and from 1975 its successor, the Heineken Trophy. Their participation in the tournament (under various names) continued into the 1990s, with matches home throughout this period being held mostly at the Windsor Park.

Having played in regional tournaments throughout the early to mid 2000s, Dominica were invited to take part in the 2006 Stanford 20/20, whose matches held official Twenty20 status. They played one match in the tournament, a 6 wicket defeat to Grenada. Two years later, they were invited to take part in the 2008 Stanford 20/20, playing two matches in the tournament, defeating the British Virgin Islands in the preliminary round, before losing to Barbados in the following round. These matches mark Dominica's only major appearances in cricket.

== Notable players ==
=== International players ===
Five players from Dominica have represented the West Indies Internationally.

- Apps denotes the number of appearances the player has made.
- Runs denotes the number of runs scored by the player.
- Wkts denotes the number of wickets taken by the player.

Name	International career	Apps	Runs	Wkts	Apps	Runs	Wkts	Apps	Runs	Wkts	References
Name	International career	Tests			ODIs			T20Is			References
Grayson Shillingford	1969–1972	7	57	15	–	–	–	–	–	–	
Irvine Shillingford	1977–1978	4	218	0	2	30	0	–	–	–	
Norbert Phillip	1978–1979	9	297	28	1	0	1	–	–	–	
Adam Sanford	2002–2004	11	72	30	–	–	–	–	–	–	
Shane Shillingford	2010–2014	16	266	70	–	–	–	–	–	–	

- Phillip DeFreitas, another Dominican cricketer represented England after moving there at a young age. He played 44 test matches and 103 ODIs for England.

Many other Dominican players have represented the Windward Islands domestically in the West Indies Regional Super50, Regional Four Day Competition and the Caribbean Twenty20.

=== Dominica players on the current Windward Islands team ===
- Shane Shillingford.
- Liam Sebastien
- Tyrone Theophile
- Mervin Matthew *Alick Athanaze *Kavem Hodge

=== See also ===
List of Windward Islands first-class cricketers

- See List of Dominica Twenty20 players and Category:Dominica cricketers
