= History of cricket in the West Indies =

The history of cricket in the West Indies is covered in the following articles:

- History of cricket in the West Indies to 1918
- History of cricket in the West Indies from 1918–19 to 1945
- History of cricket in the West Indies from 1945–46 to 1970
- History of cricket in the West Indies from 1970–71 to 1980
- History of cricket in the West Indies from 1980–81 to 1990
- History of cricket in the West Indies from 1990–91 to 2000
- History of cricket in the West Indies from 2000–01
