= Liam Sebastien =

West Indian cricketer (born 1984)

Personal information
- Full name: Liam Andrew Shannon Sebastien
- Born: 9 September 1985 (age 41); Roseau, Dominica
- Batting: Left-handed
- Bowling: Right-arm offbreak
- Role: Allrounder
- Relatives: Lockhart Sebastien (father)

Domestic team information
- Years: Team
- 2002–2017: Windward Islands
- 2015: St Lucia Stars
- FC debut: 28 February 2003 Windward Islands v India A
- Last FC: 9 November 2017 Windward Islands v Trinidad and Tobago
- LA debut: 6 October 2001 Windward Islands v Rest of Leewards
- Last LA: 10 February 2017 Windward Islands v Kent

Career statistics
Competition	FC	LA	T20
Matches	85	65	31
Runs scored	2,576	1,031	183
Batting average	21.28	25.14	16.63
100s/50s	2/13	0/4	0/0
Top score	143	72*	33*
Balls bowled	10,876	2,970	479
Wickets	183	53	17
Bowling average	25.92	37.81	31.58
5 wickets in innings	10	1	1
10 wickets in match	1	0	0
Best bowling	7/49	5/28	5/20
Catches/stumpings	51/–	27/–	7/–
- Source: Cricinfo, 8 February 2021

Liam Andrew Shannon Sebastien (born 9 September 1985), is a cricketer who plays first-class and List A cricket for the Windward Islands. He is the son of former Windward Islands and Combined Islands cricketer Lockhart Sebastien.

He was born in Roseau, Dominica and is an alumnus of the Dominica Grammar School and the University of the West Indies. Liam Sebastien's five-wicket haul carried Dominica to a record-breaking 66-run victory over British Virgin Islands (BVI) in the third match of the Stanford 20/20 at the Stanford Cricket Ground in Coolidge, Antigua. Sebastien, the Dominica captain and offspinner, became the fourth bowler to take five wickets in this tournament, as BVI, chasing 140 for victory, were dismissed for a record low 73 in 17.2 overs. The previous tournament low was 74 made by Bermuda against Jamaica. Sebastien is Dominica's most experienced player, having played 16 first-class matches for Windward Islands. In another hard-fought match in Bridgetown, Liam Sebastien smashed his second first-class century (143) to put Windward Islands on the verge of securing the first-innings lead against Barbados.
