= Combined Islands cricket team =

Cricket team that represented the cricket-playing islands of the Lesser Antilles

The Combined Islands cricket team was a cricket team that represented the cricket-playing islands of the Lesser Antilles, excluding Barbados and Trinidad and Tobago who fielded their own teams. They played in 13 Shell Shield tournaments from 1965–66 to 1980–81, when they won their first title and were subsequently disbanded into Leeward Islands and Windward Islands. Those two teams had first-class status before 1980–81, but competed together in the Shell Shield.

== History ==
The Combined Islands played 54 first-class games, winning 11, drawing 19 and losing 24. 52 of those games were in the Shell Shield tournament, with the other two games both coming in the 1961–62 season – a Pentangular Tournament preliminary round loss to British Guiana, was followed by a home defeat to the touring Indian side that same season. From then on, the team only existed as an entity for the Shell Shield, with the British Leeward Islands and British Windward Islands fielding independent teams against touring squads, and also playing first-class matches between each other.

=== Inaugural Shell Shield ===
In 1965–66, the team was among the five that played for the inaugural Shell Shield. After two draws against Jamaica and Barbados, the team went down to British Guiana, before winning the last game against Trinidad and Tobago to finish third in the table and record their first victory.

It took a further four seasons before the Combined Islands returned to the Shell Shield – the Leeward and Windward teams played games, but the matches they played did not count for points. The Combined team was back for the 1969–70 tournament, though, and duly lost all four games, with no player averaging more than 26 with the bat. This was the first season that the Shillingford cousins – Irvine and Grayson, who both represented West Indies at Test level – played for the Combined Islands and the two went on to play most Shell Shield matches for the Combined Islands together until 1976–77, Irving scoring more than 2,500 runs while Grayson took nearly 100 wickets for the team.

=== Building a team ===
In 1970–71, the Combined Islands registered their first win in five years, but still finished last behind Guyana – despite beating Guyana by 50 runs, the team lost their other three matches, and Guyana finished two points ahead. The 1971–72 season went by without a single win, although they gained a lead on first innings, but in 1972–73, the Combined Islands beat Jamaica to finish fourth after Elquemedo Willett took six for 40 in the second innings – which stood as a team record for two seasons – to help bowl Jamaica out for 132. By this time, most of the players that were to become team regulars for the remainder of its history had debuted – in addition to the Shillingford cousins, there was Vance Amory, Jim Allen, Mike Findlay, Norbert Philip, Viv Richards (who went on to play 121 Tests for the West Indies), Andy Roberts, Lockhart Sebastien and the aforementioned Willett, who all played for the Combined Islands until 1978, and four of them until the end in 1981. However, the team still failed to win more than one match a season. In 1973–74, they lost three of the four games and finished last again, despite Roberts and Philip both taking more than three wickets a match at a bowling average less than 20. That season also included their only List A game, a five-run win over the touring England side representing MCC. The Islands batted first, making 204 for 6 in 50 overs with 102 from Jim Allen and 78 from Livingstone Sargeant. Dennis Amiss made 114 for the tourists, but Grayson Shillingford (six overs for 7) and Andy Roberts (ten overs for 27) limited the scoring. Three wickets fell for 12 near the end, and the MCC finished on 199 for 6.

=== Title challengers ===
The next season, they got their best position in the Shell Shield thus far, going unbeaten through the season and also recording their first away win – a 163-run win over Barbados, their highest win yet, which also included a second-innings century from Allen and a new record bowling analysis of six for 35 from Roberts – who finished the season with 25 wickets at a bowling average of 12.72. Allen and Richards also averaged above 50 with the bat, and after three unbeaten matches initially they set themselves up for a potential trophy win. A first innings win or an outright win in their final match at the Queen's Park Oval in Trinidad and Tobago would have seen them take the trophy, but they finished with a 30-run first innings deficit, and after being set a target of 283 to win their openers Sebastien and Michael Camacho put on 101 for the first wicket. Trinidad's bowlers came back, and after two run outs and three wickets from Imtiaz Ali and Raphick Jumadeen the Combined Islands were 276 for 9. Captain Findlay and number 11 Hugh Gore added six for the final wicket before time ran out – thus, the scores were tied at the end of the match, the match was drawn since the Islands had not lost the final wicket (in which case it would have been a tie) and the Shell Shield title went to Guyana instead of the islands.

The next season saw them fall back to fourth place, however, with none of the four matches seeing more than 325 overs of play in four days as the Combined Islands drew all four games – with two ending before the first innings were completed. Irvine Shillingford still managed to hit 257 runs in his three innings, averaging 85.66 with the bat. 1976–77 saw improvement in the table again, as they once again fought for the title – they were tied with Barbados on points before the very last game, but after conceding four 50+ scores –including 113 from David Murray – and a total of 511, the team surrendered a first-innings deficit of 276 despite 124 from Richards, and though Allen made 101 in the second innings and Philip took three for 15 to boost his seasonal wicket-tally to 20, Barbados made it to the target of 53 with six wickets to spare. Thus the Islands finished second in the table, tied with Trinidad and Tobago.

The Combined Islands finished second for the third time in four seasons in 1977–78, but this time they were in last place before the final round, when they beat Trinidad and Tobago by seven wickets to avoid the last place and propel themselves up the table to a shared second place with Jamaica. All-rounder Norbert Philip took more than 20 wickets for the second year running, and also hit 240 runs, while off spinner Derick Parry took a team record seven for 100 in the first innings of a drawn game against champions Barbados. The following season, the Combined Islands were once again on the heels of Barbados, trailing by two points before the final game in Trinidad. Despite a 109-run lead after four half-centuries and six for 90 from Parry, Combined Islands were bowled out for 181 in the second innings, and David Murray put on 27 with Inshan Ali to give Trinidad and Tobago the win and the second place in the table.

The next season saw the Combined Islands return to the runners-up spot, after winning two games in a season for the first time, and before the final game in Barbados they trailed their hosts by 11 points after a drawn game in Trinidad two weeks earlier. After being put in the field by the Barbados captain, Combined Islands batted to a total of 257, before centuries from Emmerson Trotman and Thelston Payne helped Barbados to a total of 555 – with Viv Richards getting the best bowling returns for the Islands with two for 71. However, he only made 3 with the bat, as his team were bowled out for 279 – losing by an innings and 19 runs, and finishing second again. Earlier on in the season, Parry had beaten his own best-innings bowling record, with nine for 76 against Jamaica, in a match where he took 15 for 101 – a record for all West Indies domestic teams which stood for 16 years. Parry finished the season with 25 wickets.

=== Shell Shield victory, and dissolution ===
Finally, after four runner-up spots in the preceding six seasons, it was the Combined Islands' turn to win the Shell Shield trophy in 1980–81. After starting with a draw in Trinidad, the Combined Islands won both home games – first an innings win over Jamaica, in which Andy Roberts took 11 for 101 and completed a hat-trick, and then a 165-run win over Guyana which sealed the trophy with one game to play – against Barbados, who were 35 points behind. Despite going down by an innings and 16 runs, the Combined Islands finished 12 points ahead of Barbados – who had been docked nine of those points due to a slow over rate. The Test stars Richards and Roberts topped the batting and bowling tables respectively – Richards making 323 runs despite being dismissed for 13 and 4 by Barbados, while Roberts took 24 wickets in the three games not against Barbados – and one for 48 against the Bajans.

The innings defeat was the end of the Combined Islands team. The West Indies Cricket Board made the decision to split the team into Windward and Leeward Islands, and the first match of the 1981–82 Shell Shield was played between these two teams – the Leeward Islands, whose team included 10 players who had played for the Combined team the previous season, won by 57 runs, and has continued to be the more successful of the two sides with three first-class titles. The Windwards are yet to win a single one.

== First class statistics ==
=== Batting and fielding ===
Combined Islands batting and fielding statistics Qualification: 10 matches
Name	Batting hand	Career	Mat	Inn	NO	Runs	HS	Avg	100	50	Ct	St
Irvine Shillingford	Right	1961–1981	49	83	5	2788	120	35.74	6	16	54	
Jim Allen	Right	1971–1981	30	50	1	1698	161	34.65	4	9	27	
Viv Richards	Right	1971–1981	26	49	2	1661	168*	35.34	5	9	18	
Lockhart Sebastien	Right	1972–1980	32	57	6	1611	95	31.58	0	13	27	
Norbert Philip	Right	1970–1980	31	50	6	1143	99	25.97	0	10	13	
Victor Eddy	Right	1973–1980	26	38	4	1016	131	29.88	2	4	12	
Mike Findlay	Right	1969–1978	36	60	6	951	68*	17.61	0	2	67	15
Derick Parry	Right	1976–1981	20	29	2	812	96	30.07	0	6	22	
Livingstone Sargeant	Right	1970–1974	15	30	0	664	80	22.13	0	3	6	
Enoch Lewis	Right	1977–1981	13	24	2	655	57	29.77	0	3	15	
Leonard Harris	n/a	1961–1971	14	27	1	628	72	24.15	0	5	7	
Vance Amory	Right	1969–1981	17	33	1	603	64	18.84	0	3	11	
Andy Roberts	Right	1970–1981	26	44	8	483	63	13.41	0	2	10	
Alford Corriette	Right	1972–1976	13	21	2	439	113*	23.10	1	2	4	
Elquemedo Willett	Left	1970–1980	33	53	13	421	47	10.52	0	0	30	
Grayson Shillingford	Left	1969–1979	31	51	15	377	42	10.47	0	0	13	
Michael Camacho	Right	1974–1978	14	22	3	365	65	19.21	0	2	12	
Hugh Gore	Right	1974–1977	11	14	4	221	67	22.10	0	2	6	
Ignatius Cadette	Right	1978–1981	10	14	3	201	37*	18.27	0	0	16	1

=== Bowling ===
Combined Islands bowling statistics Qualification: 600 balls bowled
Name	Bowling style	Career	Mat	Balls	Mdns	Runs	Wkts	Avg	BBI	5wI	10wM
Andy Roberts	RF	1970–1981	26	4420	166	2017	107	18.85	7–30	6	1
Norbert Philip	RFM	1970–1980	31	4921	180	2238	106	21.11	5–43	5	1
Grayson Shillingford	RFM	1969–1979	31	4851	140	2476	95	26.06	6–49	3	0
Derick Parry	OB	1976–1981	20	5757	249	2273	92	24.70	9–76	7	1
Elquemedo Willett	SLA	1970–1980	33	7415	302	2687	73	36.80	6–40	1	0
Hugh Gore	LFM	1974–1977	11	1746	69	672	25	26.88	4–43	0	0
Alford Corriette	RM	1972–1976	13	1878	68	819	25	32.76	4–33	0	0
Viv Richards	OB, RM	1971–1981	26	1987	97	764	20	38.20	3–30	0	0
Victor Eddy	OB	1973–1980	26	2160	101	807	13	62.07	2–26	0	0

== Grounds ==
Out of 30 first-class home games, the most were played in Warner Park on Saint Kitts, which hosted seven games. The team played cricket on a total of eight different islands, with Antigua getting six, Saint Lucia five, Grenada four, Dominica and Saint Vincent three, while Montserrat and Nevis hosted one game each.

== Records ==
=== Team records ===
- Highest total for: 481 v Jamaica, 1980–81 Shell Shield, Basseterre, 23–26 January 1981
- Highest total against: 555 by Barbados, 1979–80 Shell Shield, Bridgetown, 25–28 April 1980
- Lowest total for: 53 v Barbados, 1973–74 Shell Shield, Basseterre, 5–8 January 1974
- Lowest total against: 85 by Trinidad and Tobago, 1965–66 Shell Shield, Castries, 11–14 March 1966

=== Batting records ===
- Highest innings: 168 not out, Viv Richards v Trinidad and Tobago, 1980–81 Shell Shield, Queen's Park Oval, 17–20 January 1981
- Highest partnerships for each wicket:

Partnership	Runs	Players	Opposition	Venue	Season
1st wicket	139	Lockhart Sebastien & Michael Camacho	v Trinidad and Tobago	Port of Spain	1976–77
2nd wicket	118	Lockhart Sebastien & Jim Allen	v Trinidad and Tobago	Basseterre	1975–76
3rd wicket	147	Jim Allen & Viv Richards	v Guyana	Rose Hall	1973–74
4th wicket	163	Irvine Shillingford & Victor Eddy	v Trinidad and Tobago	Port of Spain	1976–77
5th wicket	140	Viv Richards & Derick Parry	v Jamaica	Basseterre	1980–81
6th wicket	111	Irvine Shillingford & Derick Parry	v Barbados	Castries	1977–78
7th wicket	109	Alford Corriette & Irvine Shillingford	v Trinidad and Tobago	Port of Spain	1972–73
8th wicket	110	Norbert Phillip & Elquemedo Willett	v Barbados	Bridgetown	1972–73
9th wicket	146	Victor Eddy & Hugh Gore	v Jamaica	Kingstown	1976–77
10th wicket	62	Mike Findlay & Hugh Gore	v Jamaica	St John's	1974–75

=== Bowling records ===
- Most wickets in an innings: 9–76, Derick Parry v Jamaica, 1979–80 Shell Shield, Kingston, 21–24 March 1980
- Most wickets in a match: 15–101, Derick Parry v Jamaica, 1979–80 Shell Shield, Kingston, 21–24 March 1980
