= Delroy Morgan =

Jamaican cricketer

Personal information
- Full name: Delroy Simeon Morgan
- Born: 4 March 1967 (age 59); Rollington Town, Kingston, Jamaica
- Batting: Right-handed
- Bowling: Right-arm off-spin
- Role: Batsman

Domestic team information
- Years: Team
- 1986/87–1999/2000: Jamaica

Career statistics
Competition	FC	LA
Matches	62	39
Runs scored	2,878	1,064
Batting average	27.94	29.55
100s/50s	3/14	1/7
Top score	122	133*
Balls bowled	504	462
Wickets	5	11
Bowling average	40.00	28.18
5 wickets in innings	0	0
10 wickets in match	0	–
Best bowling	4/31	2/24
Catches/stumpings	59/–	24/–
- Source: Cricinfo, 24 April 2024

Delroy Simeon Morgan (born 4 March 1967) is a former Jamaican cricketer. He played in 62 first-class and 39 List A matches for the Jamaican cricket team from 1986 to 1998.

Primarily an opening batsman, Morgan had his best season in 1988–89, when he was the highest scorer in the Red Stripe Cup, with 435 runs at an average of 54.37. That season he hit his two highest first-class scores: 122 against Guyana and, a week later, 111 against Leeward Islands. Jamaica won both matches by an innings and went on to win the tournament.

Morgan played as the professional for Lowerhouse in the Lancashire League in 1990. His highest score in List A cricket was 133 not out, when he batted throughout the innings against Canada in the Shell/Sandals Trophy in 1996–97.

Morgan captained Jamaica several times in the 1990s, and was later a member of the national selection panel.
