= Augustus Gregoire =

Dominica cricketer

Personal information
- Born: 1936; Roseau, Dominica
- Died: 4 February 1972 (aged 35–36)
- Batting: Left-handed
- Role: Wicket-keeper

Domestic team information
- Years: Team
- 1969: Windward Islands
- Source: CricketArchive, 24 February 2016

Augustus Gregoire (1936 – 4 February 1972) was a Dominican cricketer who represented the Windward Islands in West Indian domestic cricket. He played as a wicket-keeper.

Gregoire made his first-class debut for the Windwards during the 1968–69 Shell Shield season, playing against Trinidad and Tobago in January 1969. He played solely as a batsman on debut, with Bryan Mauricette taking the gloves. Gregoire's second and final first-class match came against Jamaica, four days after the conclusion of his first. In the first innings, he scored 43 not out from seventh in the batting order, which was his highest score at that level. Although he never again represented the Windwards, Gregoire continued to play for the Dominican national team in regional competitions. He even captained his country for a period, although his appointment was controversial, as he was perceived to have a lesser social standing than his predecessors. Gregoire died in 1972, only a few years after the peak of his career, and his death was said to have "shocked [the] cricketing community".
