= Irvine Shillingford =

West Indian cricketer (1944–2023)

Personal information
- Full name: Irvine Theodore Shillingford
- Born: 18 April 1944; Dublanc, Dominica
- Died: 26 January 2023 (aged 78); Dominica
- Batting: Right-handed
- Bowling: Right-arm off break
- Relatives: H. D. Shillingford (grandfather); Grayson Shillingford (cousin)

International information
- National side: West Indies
- Test debut: 4 March 1977 v Pakistan
- Last Test: 31 March 1978 v Australia
- ODI debut: 22 February 1978 v Australia
- Last ODI: 12 April 1978 v Australia

Domestic team information
- Years: Team
- 1961–1981: Combined Islands
- 1964–1982: Windward Islands

Career statistics
Competition	Tests	ODIs	FC	LA
Matches	4	2	92	20
Runs scored	218	30	5,449	320
Batting average	31.14	15.00	36.57	20.00
100s/50s	1/0	0/0	11/28	0/0
Top score	120	24	238	36
Balls bowled	0	0	204	17
Wickets	–	–	1	0
Bowling average	–	–	85.00	–
5 wickets in innings	–	–	0	0
10 wickets in match	–	–	0	0
Best bowling	–	–	1/15	0/18
Catches/stumpings	1/–	2/–	93/–	10/–
- Source: CricketArchive, 17 October 2010

Irvine Theodore "Boach" Shillingford, DAH (18 April 1944 – 26 January 2023) was a West Indian cricketer who played four Tests and two ODIs in 1977 and 1978. He also played a further 88 first class games, 49 of them for the Combined Islands, whom he represented from its inception in 1961 until the dissolution of the team in 1981. He also played first class cricket for the Windward Islands.

== Early life ==
Shillingford was born on 18 April 1944 in Dublanc, Dominica to parents Cuthbert Shillingford and Iris Placid. His father was an executive at A. C. Shillingford & Co. His first cousin was fellow West Indies test cricketer Grayson Shillingford. He attended the Dominica Grammar School in Roseau, graduating in 1962.

== Career ==
His Test career began when he was selected for three Tests of the five-match 1976–77 home Test series against Pakistan, replacing Maurice Foster who had made 19 runs from number six in the first Test. Shillingford had made the most runs in the Shell Shield the previous season, with 257, and though he was aged nearly 33 he was given the chance. He made 39 from number five in the first West Indies' innings – in an 81-run partnership with opener Roy Fredericks, helping the West Indies to a lead of 136 runs on first innings. Shillingford only made two runs in the second innings, but the West Indies still won with six wickets to spare.

Shillingford was retained for the third Test, and held a catch to dismiss Khan in the first innings, as Pakistan made 194. After the West Indies lost Fredericks early on, Gordon Greenidge, Viv Richards and Alvin Kallicharran took West Indies to 193 for 3 when Shillingford came in to bat, and batted for 315 minutes, hitting fifteen fours and one six in a career best 120. Despite Shillingford's century and a lead of 254, the West Indian bowlers could not back up the batsmen, and Pakistan made 540 in the second innings to secure the draw.

However, in the fourth Test, Shillingford made two sub-25 scores as he was dismissed twice by the opposing captain, leg spinning all-rounder Mushtaq Mohammad, as Pakistan won the match by 266 runs. Shillingford was thus dropped for the final Test at Sabina Park, with Barbados all-rounder Collis King replacing him.

Shillingford was also selected for one Test match against Australia in 1977–78, when the West Indies made nine changes from the previous Test due to players' involvement with World Series Cricket. He made three and 16 in a three-wicket loss, and though the team remained much the same for the fourth Test, Shillingford was replaced by Guyana batsman Faoud Bacchus. He also played two ODIs during that series, making 24 in the first match which the West Indies won and 6 off 17 balls in the second match which Australia won.

He was awarded the Dominica Award of Honour in 1977.

Shillingford continued to play domestic cricket until 1981–82, enjoying a Shell Shield victory with his Combined Islands team in 1980–81, and also playing four matches for the Windward Islands the following season. However, his final season was not his greatest – with 112 first class runs at a batting average of 18.66, he failed to pass fifty a single time, though his team finished second in the Shell Shield table.

== Personal life ==
Shillingford married Elizabeth Durand in 1973. He had 11 children.

Shillingford died on 26 January 2023, at the age of 78.
