= Lockhart Sebastien =

West Indies cricketer

Personal information
- Full name: Lockhart Christopher Sebastien
- Born: 31 October 1955 (age 71); Colihaut, Saint Peter Parish, Dominica
- Batting: Right-handed
- Bowling: Right-arm medium-pace
- Relatives: Liam Sebastien (son)

Domestic team information
- Years: Team
- 1971-72 to 1988-89: Windward Islands
- 1972-73 to 1979-80: Combined Islands

Career statistics
Competition	First-class	List A
Matches	92	34
Runs scored	4934	906
Batting average	32.89	29.22
100s/50s	5/33	2/5
Top score	219	105
Balls bowled	628	557
Wickets	9	17
Bowling average	47.00	25.05
5 wickets in innings	0	1
10 wickets in match	0	n/a
Best bowling	4/49	5/34
Catches/stumpings	59/–	8/–
- Source: Cricinfo, 12 November 2020

Lockhart Christopher Sebastien (born 31 October 1955) is a former cricketer from Dominica who played first-class cricket for the Combined Islands and the Windward Islands from 1972 to 1989. He is the father of current Windward Islands cricketer Liam Sebastien.

Sebastien was an opening batsman and occasional medium-paced bowler. His highest first-class score was 219 for Windward Islands against Leeward Islands in 1978-79, when he and Irvine Shillingford added 202 for the second wicket. He was also an effective one-day player as an all-rounder, winning several player of the match awards, including one in 1981-82 when he dominated Windward Islands' victory over Trinidad and Tobago, taking 4 for 31 and scoring 72 not out.

After his playing career ended, Sebastien worked as a sports officer for many years in the Dominica Ministry of Sports. He managed the Windward Islands senior team for 12 years, served as a director on the Windward Islands cricket board for 10 years, and managed the West Indies A team tours to India in 2013 and Sri Lanka in 2014. He was appointed a West Indies selector in 2016.
