= Harold Joseph =

Trinidadian cricketer (born 1956)

Personal information
- Born: 15 July 1956 (age 70); Carapo, Arima, Trinidad
- Batting: Right-handed
- Bowling: Right-arm leg-spin
- Role: Bowler

Domestic team information
- Years: Team
- 1980/81–1987/88: Trinidad and Tobago

Career statistics
Competition	FC	List A
Matches	25	7
Runs scored	288	34
Batting average	12.52	17.00
100s/50s	0/0	0/0
Top score	41	16*
Balls bowled	2,564	366
Wickets	75	8
Bowling average	34.18	22.75
5 wickets in innings	3	0
10 wickets in match	0	0
Best bowling	6/105	3/7
Catches/stumpings	8/–	1/–
- Source: Cricinfo, 13 September 2026

Harold Joseph (born 15 July 1956) is a former Trinidadian cricketer. He played in 25 first-class and seven List A matches, mostly for Trinidad and Tobago, from 1974 to 1988.

Joseph was born in Carapo village in Arima, where he attended Arima Government Secondary School.

Joseph was a right-arm leg-spin bowler. He was the second-most successful bowler in the 1980–81 Shell Shield, taking 18 wickets at an average of 27.88. He toured Zimbabwe with the Young West Indies team in October 1981, and then toured Australia as the only specialist spinner in the West Indian Test team in 1981–82. However, he appeared in only two of the first-class matches, and none of the Tests.

Joseph's best first-class bowling figures were 6 for 105 for Trinidad and Tobago against Combined Islands in the Shell Shield in January 1981. A month later he took 5 for 116 against the touring English team. In List A cricket, he took his best figures in his debut match, the final of the 1980–81 Geddes Grant/Harrison Line Trophy in April 1981: 3 for 7 from 10 overs, earning him the player of the match award, and helping Trinidad and Tobago to win the championship.

Joseph worked for the Arima borough corporation before opening a shop in Tunapuna.
