= Alford Corriette =

West Indian cricketer (1948–2023)

Personal information
- Full name: Alford Ferdinand Christopher Corriette
- Born: 23 August 1948; Montserrat
- Died: 2 January 2023 (aged 74); Brooklyn, New York, United States of America
- Batting: Right-handed
- Bowling: Right-arm medium
- Role: All-rounder

Domestic team information
- Years: Team
- 1972/73–1975/76: Combined Leeward and Windward Island
- 1972/73–1975/76: Leeward Islands
- 1970–1976: Montserrat

Career statistics
Competition	First-class	List A
Matches	22	2
Runs scored	851	12
Batting average	25.78	12.00
100s/50s	1/6	0/0
Top score	113*	9
Balls bowled	3,185	108
Wickets	44	1
Bowling average	30.61	81.00
5 wickets in innings	0	0
10 wickets in match	0	–
Best bowling	4/33	1/31
Catches/stumpings	6/–	0/–
- Source: Cricinfo, 14 October 2012

Alford Ferdinand Christopher Corriette (23 August 1948 – 2 January 2023) was a West Indies cricketer who played 24 matches for the Combined Islands and the Leeward Islands in a career that lasted from 1972 until 1976. A right-handed batsman and right-arm medium pace bowler, Corriette scored 851 runs and claimed 44 wickets in his first-class career, including 81 against the touring Australian cricket team in 1973.

Corriette moved to the US in 1982, working as a plumber and electrician in New York.
