= Victor Eddy =

West Indian cricketer (born 1955)

Personal information
- Full name: Victor Austin Eddy
- Born: 14 February 1955 (age 71); St. Kitts
- Batting: Right-handed
- Bowling: Right-arm offbreak
- Role: Batsman

Domestic team information
- Years: Team
- 1973/74–1987/88: Leeward Islands

Career statistics
Competition	First-class	List A
Matches	59	20
Runs scored	2,994	323
Batting average	35.64	24.84
100s/50s	5/15	0/1
Top score	139	76
Balls bowled	4,426	246
Wickets	44	4
Bowling average	39.22	56.00
5 wickets in innings	1	0
10 wickets in match	0	0
Best bowling	5/40	1/9
Catches/stumpings	30/–	8/–
- Source: CricketArchive, 9 April 2022

Victor Austin Eddy (born 14 February 1955, in St Kitts) was a West Indies cricketer in the 1970s and 1980s. He played for the Combined Islands and Leeward Islands in his first-class career. His batting style was right hand and bowling style right-arm offbreak.
