= Hugh Gore (cricketer) =

West Indian cricketer (born 1953)

Personal information
- Full name: Hugh Edmond Ivor Gore
- Born: 18 June 1953 (age 73); St John's, Antigua
- Batting: Right-handed
- Bowling: Left-arm fast-medium

Domestic team information
- Years: Team
- 1972–1979: Leeward Islands
- 1974–1977: Combined Islands
- 1980: Somerset

Career statistics
Competition	FC	LA
Matches	34	7
Runs scored	382	5
Batting average	13.17	1.66
100s/50s	0/2	0/0
Top score	67	5
Balls bowled	4692	360
Wickets	57	9
Bowling average	33.63	17.77
5 wickets in innings	1	0
10 wickets in match	0	n/a
Best bowling	5/66	3/19
Catches/stumpings	14/–	2/–
- Source: CricketArchive, 22 December 2015

Hugh Edmond Ivor Gore (born 18 June 1953) is a former cricketer from Antigua who played first-class cricket from 1973 to 1980.

Gore was born in St. John's, Antigua. A right-handed batsman and left-arm fast-medium bowler, he took 57 career first-class wickets at an average of 33.63. He played for the Combined Islands and the Leeward Islands in the West Indies, a season for the Border Second XI and finished his career with a season at Somerset County Cricket Club in England.
