= Livingstone Sargeant =

West Indian cricketer (born 1947)

Livingstone Clement Sargeant (born 15 April 1947 in Cotton Ground, Nevis), is a former West Indian cricketer who played for the Combined Islands and the Leeward Islands in the 1960s and the 1970s.
