= Ignatius Cadette =

West Indian cricketer (born 1957)

Ignatius Cadette (born 3 March 1957 in Castries, Saint Lucia) is a former West Indian cricketer who played first-class and List A cricket for Windward Islands and the Combined Islands cricket team in the 1970s and 1980s as a batsman and wicketkeeper.
