= Michael Camacho =

West Indian cricketer (born 1953)

Michael Stephen Camacho (born 4 March 1953 in Antigua) is a former West Indian cricketer who played first-class and List A cricket for the Combined Islands and the Leeward Islands cricket teams.
