= List of international cricketers from Jamaica =

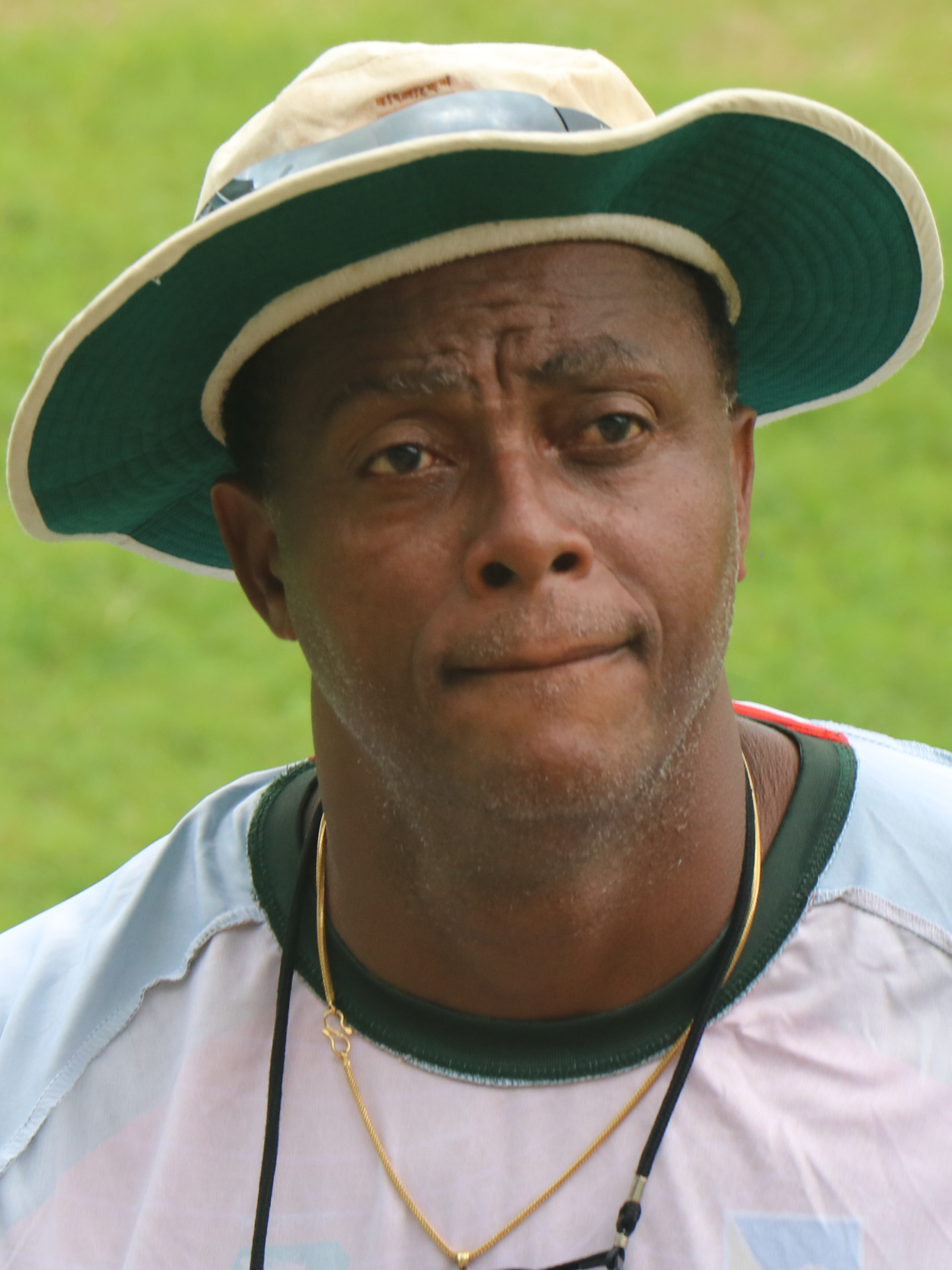
Courtney Walsh—the leading Jamaican wicket taker in Tests and ODIs.

The island nation of Jamaica is one of the regions which makes up the West Indies cricket team. It has produced international cricketers in all forms of the game—Tests, One Day Internationals (ODIs) and Twenty20 Internationals (T20Is). Freddie Martin and Karl Nunes became the first Jamaicans to play international cricket when they appeared in the West Indies's inaugural Test match, against England in 1928. Nunes captained the West Indies during this match, the first of seven Jamaicans to do so.

Chris Gayle has scored the most runs by a Jamaican in Tests, ODIs and T20Is. He is also the highest overall scorer for the West Indies in both ODIs with 10480 runs and T20Is with 1889 runs. Courtney Walsh, who has also captained the West Indies, has taken the most wickets by a Jamaican in Tests and ODIs. He is also the highest wicket taking West Indian in Tests and ODIs, having taken 519 and 227 wickets respectively. Alf Valentine and Jerome Taylor are the only other Jamaicans to have taken 100 or more wickets in test matches. Along with that, Gayle and Taylor are the only other Jamaicans to take 100 or more wickets in one day internationals. With 132 appearances, Walsh has also played the most matches by a West Indian in Tests.

== List ==
- Apps denotes the number of appearances the player has made.
- Runs denotes the number of runs scored by the player.
- Wkts denotes the number of wickets taken by the player.

West Indies captains

Statistics correct as of: October 2022

Name	International career	Apps	Runs	Wkts	Apps	Runs	Wkts	Apps	Runs	Wkts	References
Name	International career	Tests			ODIs			T20Is			References
Freddie Martin	1928–1931	9	486	8	–	–	–	–	–	–	
Karl Nunes	1928–1930	4	245	0	–	–	–	–	–	–	
Tommy Scott	1928–1931	8	171	22	–	–	–	–	–	–	
George Headley	1930–1954	22	2,190	0	–	–	–	–	–	–	
Ivan Barrow	1930–1939	11	276	0	–	–	–	–	–	–	
Oscar Da Costa	1930–1935	5	153	3	–	–	–	–	–	–	
George Gladstone	1930	1	12	1	–	–	–	–	–	–	
Charles Passailaigue	1930	1	46	0	–	–	–	–	–	–	
Vincent Valentine	1933	2	35	1	–	–	–	–	–	–	
Leslie Hylton	1935–1939	6	70	16	–	–	–	–	–	–	
Dickie Fuller	1935	1	1	0	–	–	–	–	–	–	
George Mudie	1935	1	5	3	–	–	–	–	–	–	
John Cameron	1939	2	6	3	–	–	–	–	–	–	
Hines Johnson	1948–1950	3	38	13	–	–	–	–	–	–	
Esmond Kentish	1948–1954	2	1	8	–	–	–	–	–	–	
Ken Rickards	1948–1952	2	104	0	–	–	–	–	–	–	
Jimmy Cameron	1948–1949	5	151	3	–	–	–	–	–	–	
Allan Rae	1948–1953	15	1,016	0	–	–	–	–	–	–	
Alf Valentine	1950–1962	36	141	139	–	–	–	–	–	–	
Alfie Binns	1953–1956	5	64	0	–	–	–	–	–	–	
Roy Miller	1953	1	23	0	–	–	–	–	–	–	
Alfred Scott	1953	1	5	0	–	–	–	–	–	–	
John Holt	1954–1959	17	1,066	1	–	–	–	–	–	–	
Collie Smith	1955–1959	26	1,331	48	–	–	–	–	–	–	
Tom Dewdney	1955–1958	9	17	21	–	–	–	–	–	–	
Roy Gilchrist	1957–1959	13	60	57	–	–	–	–	–	–	
Gerry Alexander	1957–1961	25	961	0	–	–	–	–	–	–	
Easton McMorris	1958–1966	13	564	0	–	–	–	–	–	–	
Reg Scarlett	1960	3	54	2	–	–	–	–	–	–	
Chester Watson	1960–1962	7	12	19	–	–	–	–	–	–	
Jackie Hendriks	1962–1969	20	447	0	–	–	–	–	–	–	
Lester King	1962–1968	2	41	9	–	–	–	–	–	–	
Maurice Foster	1969–1978	14	580	9	2	25	2	–	–	–	
Arthur Barrett	1971–1975	6	40	13	–	–	–	–	–	–	
Desmond Lewis	1971	3	259	0	–	–	–	–	–	–	
Uton Dowe	1971–1973	4	8	12	–	–	–	–	–	–	
Lawrence Rowe	1972–1980	30	2,047	0	11	136	0	–	–	–	
Ron Headley	1973	2	62	0	1	19	0	–	–	–	
Michael Holding	1975–1987	60	910	249	102	282	142	–	–	–	
Richard Austin	1978	2	22	0	1	8	0	–	–	–	
Basil Williams	1978–1979	7	469	0	–	–	–	–	–	–	
Herbert Chang	1979	1	8	0	–	–	–	–	–	–	
Everton Mattis	1981	4	145	0	2	86	0	–	–	–	
Jeff Dujon	1981–1991	81	3,322	0	169	1,945	0	–	–	–	
Courtney Walsh	1984–2001	132	936	519	205	321	227	–	–	–	
Patrick Patterson	1986–1993	28	145	93	59	44	90	–	–	–	
Robert Haynes	1989–1991	–	–	–	8	26	5	–	–	–	
Jimmy Adams	1992–2001	54	3,012	27	127	2,204	43	–	–	–	
Laurie Williams	1996–2001	–	–	–	15	124	18	–	–	–	
Robert Samuels	1996–1997	6	372	0	8	54	0	–	–	–	
Franklyn Rose	1997–2000	19	344	53	27	217	29	–	–	–	
Nehemiah Perry	1999–2000	4	74	10	21	212	20	–	–	–	
Ricardo Powell	1999–2005	2	53	0	109	2,085	11	–	–	–	
Wavell Hinds	2000–2010	45	2,608	16	119	2,880	28	5	30	0	
Chris Gayle^{[a]}	2000–2021	103	7,214	73	301	10480	167	79	1899	20	
Marlon Samuels	2000–2018	71	3,917	41	207	5,606	89	67	1611	22	
Leon Garrick	2001	1	27	0	3	99	0	–	–	–	
Jermaine Lawson	2001–2005	13	52	51	13	18	17	–	–	–	
Daren Powell	2002–2009	37	407	85	55	118	71	5	1	2	
Gareth Breese	2002	1	5	2	–	–	–	–	–	–	
Carlton Baugh	2003–2012	21	610	0	47	482	0	3	10	0	
David Bernard	2003–2010	3	202	4	20	141	14	1	1	0	
Jerome Taylor	2003–2018	46	856	130	90	278	128	30	118	33	
Xavier Marshall	2005–2009	7	243	0	24	375	0	6	36	0	
Donovan Pagon	2005	2	37	0	–	–	–	–	–	–	
Dwight Washington	2005	1	7	0	–	–	–	–	–	–	
Brenton Parchment	2007–2008	2	55	0	7	122	0	1	10	0	
Shawn Findlay	2008–2009	–	–	–	9	146	0	2	32	0	
Nikita Miller	2008–2018	1	5	0	50	284	45	9	43	11	
Chadwick Walton	2009–2018	2	13	0	9	53	0	19	225	–	
Andre Russell	2010–	1	2	1	56	1034	70	67	741	39	
Danza Hyatt	2011–2012	–	–	–	9	112	0	5	64	0	
Nkrumah Bonner	2011–	14	787	1	6	85	1	2	27	0	
Krishmar Santokie	2011–2014	–	–	–	–	–	–	12	0	18	
Jermaine Blackwood	2014–	48	2566	4	3	23	0	–	–	–	
Rovman Powell	2016–	–	–	–	45	897	3	52	826	4	
Fabian Allen	2018–	–	–	–	20	200	7	34	267	24	
Oshane Thomas	2018–	–	–	–	20	13	27	20	9	21	
John Campbell	2019–	20	888	0	6	248	0	2	11	0	
Brandon King	2019–	–	–	–	20	431	–	30	665	–	

== Notes ==
- ^{a} Gayle played 3 ODIs for the ICC World XI

== See also ==
- List of West Indies Test cricketers
- List of West Indies ODI cricketers
- List of West Indies Twenty20 International cricketers
