= Gordon Brooks (photographer) =

Barbadian photographer (died 2021)

Order of Barbados Gordon Brooks
- Born: 28 September 1939
- Died: 29 June 2021 (aged 81)
- Occupations: photographer, photojournalist, cricket journalist and newspaper director
- Spouse: Ira
- Children: 3

Gordon F. Delisle Brooks, Order of Barbados (died 29 June 2021), known as Gordon Brooks, was a photographer, photojournalist, cricket journalist and newspaper director. He was well known for his photography especially on his photography work covering the West Indies national cricket team for over 40 years. He was involved in the formation of Barbadian newspaper, Daily Nation.

== Career ==
Brooks pursued his career as a full time photographer in his home country Barbados in the 1960s. He also took special interest in taking photographs covering the sport of cricket and he soon emerged and developed himself as an internationally acclaimed cricket photographer. He started to take photographs of the West Indies men's cricket team in the 1970s.

In 1971, Brooks established the Brooks La Touche Photography Agency and primarily engaged in photography shoots. The studio is currently regarded as the prominent and leading photo studio in Barbados. He helped found the Nation Newspaper (now known as Daily Nation) in 1973 and also served as the director of Nation Publishing Co Limited, which is a prominent newspaper press in Barbados.

Brooks' photographs covering the West Indies cricket team have appeared in print and online publications globally. His photographs have also regularly featured in the pages of The West Indies Cricket Annual, a renowned West Indies cricket magazine. Brooks published his first book titled Caught in Action in 2003, which was based on the 20-year history of West Indies cricket team (1980-2000). He had also taken photographs of world leaders including Nelson Mandela and Bill Clinton which have appeared in publications.

Brooks had also worked as a sports journalist, often collaborating with fellow veteran Barbadian cricket journalist Tony Cozier especially when covering international cricket matches featuring West Indies.

In 2011, Brooks was conferred with the prestigious Silver Crown of Merit for his contributions in the field of photography.

== Personal life and death ==
Brooks was married to Ira Brooks, with whom he had three children: Enrico, Randy, and Makeba Brooks. Both sons are photographers, and Randy also followed the footsteps of Gordon as a cricket photographer. He died on 29 June 2021, aged 81, from illness. The Prime Minister of Barbados, Mia Mottley, and Cricket West Indies paid their condolences and tributes to Gordon.
