= History of cricket in the West Indies from 1970–71 to 1980 =

This article describes the history of West Indies cricket from 1971 to 1980.

The West Indies cricket team was in transition as the 1970s began and it suffered a humiliating series defeat on the 1975–76 tour of Australia. New captain Clive Lloyd was determined that such a defeat must never happen again and decided that the lessons of that tour must be learned. On the 1975–76 tour, the difference between the two teams was the aggressive pace bowling of Jeff Thomson and Dennis Lillee. Lloyd decided that West Indies must nurture its own pace battery to create similar havoc among its opponents. The emergence of Andy Roberts and Michael Holding at this time ensured that the first implementation of the new policy on the 1976 tour of England was a success. West Indies could still produce great batsmen too and few have been better than Viv Richards.

This combination of strength in pace bowling and batting enabled West Indies to dominate world cricket for more than 15 years until the 1990s.

== Domestic cricket 1970–71 to 1980 ==
=== Shell Shield winners ===
- 1970–71 Trinidad and Tobago
- 1971–72 Barbados
- 1972–73 Guyana
- 1973–74 Barbados
- 1974–75 Guyana
- 1975–76 Trinidad and Tobago
- 1976–77 Barbados
- 1977–78 Barbados
- 1978–79 Barbados
- 1979–80 Barbados

=== 1970–71 season ===
Trinidad and Tobago, captained by Joey Carew, retained their Shell Shield title. They beat Combined Islands and Barbados, and drew with Jamaica and Guyana.

The Beaumont Cup, a first-class knock-out competition competed for by North Trinidad, South Trinidad, Central Trinidad and East Trinidad, was retained by North Trinidad when the final between themselves and East Trinidad was drawn. This was the first season in which the competition had been expanded to four teams. From its inception in 1926, only North and South Trinidad had previously competed.

==== 1970–71 Shell Shield Table ====
Position	Team	Played	Won	Lost	DWF	DLF	Points
Pts	–	–	12	0	6	2	–
1	Trinidad and Tobago	4	2	0	1	1	32
2	Jamaica	4	2	0	0	2	28
3	Barbados	4	1	2	1	0	18
4	Guyana	4	0	1	2	1	14
5	Combined Islands	4	1	3	0	0	12

Note: DWF = drawn, won on first innings. LWF = drawn, lost on first innings.

==== Leading batsmen 1970–71 ====
1970–71 West Indian cricket season – leading batsmen by average
Name	Innings	Runs	Highest	Average	100s
Sunil Gavaskar	16	1169	220	97.41	5
Garry Sobers	15	889	178*	74.08	4
Dilip Sardesai	13	883	212	67.92	3
Richard de Souza	9	336	95	67.20	0
Desmond Lewis	13	652	96	65.20	0

==== Leading bowlers 1970–71 ====
1970–71 West Indian cricket season – leading bowlers by average
Name	Balls	Maidens	Runs	Wickets	Average
Norbert Phillip	821	36	297	17	17.47
Pascall Roberts	1119	71	331	16	20.68
Prince Bartholomew	1290	42	593	27	21.96
Uton Dowe	1554	54	773	33	23.42
John Shepherd	1068	45	405	17	23.82

Qualification: 10 or more wickets.

== International tours 1970–71 to 1980 ==
=== India 1970–71 ===
- [ 1st Test] at Sabina Park, Kingston – match drawn
- [ 2nd Test] at Queen's Park Oval, Port of Spain, Trinidad – India won by 7 wickets
- [ 3rd Test] at Bourda, Georgetown – match drawn
- [ 4th Test] at Kensington Oval, Bridgetown, Barbados – match drawn
- [ 5th Test] at Queen's Park Oval, Port of Spain, Trinidad – match drawn

India defeated West Indies by one match to nil, with four matches drawn. Their win came in the second Test, at Port-of-Spain. It was their first win in 25 Tests between the two countries. Sunil Gavaskar, aged twenty-one and in his first Test series, scored 774 runs in four Tests, at an average of 154.80. Srinivasaraghavan Venkataraghavan took 22 wickets at 33.91.

=== New Zealand 1971–72 ===
- [ 1st Test] at Sabina Park, Kingston – match drawn
- [ 2nd Test] at Queen's Park Oval, Port of Spain, Trinidad – match drawn
- [ 3rd Test] at Kensington Oval, Bridgetown, Barbados – match drawn
- [ 4th Test] at Bourda, Georgetown – match drawn
- [ 5th Test] at Queen's Park Oval, Port of Spain, Trinidad – match drawn

=== Australia 1972–73 ===
- [ 1st Test] at Sabina Park, Kingston – match drawn
- [ 2nd Test] at Kensington Oval, Bridgetown, Barbados – match drawn
- [ 3rd Test] at Queen's Park Oval, Port of Spain, Trinidad – Australia won by 44 runs
- [ 4th Test] at Bourda, Georgetown – Australia won by 10 wickets
- [ 5th Test] at Queen's Park Oval, Port of Spain, Trinidad – match drawn

=== England 1973–74 ===
- [ 1st Test] at Queen's Park Oval, Port of Spain, Trinidad – West Indies won by 7 wickets
- [ 2nd Test] at Sabina Park, Kingston – match drawn
- [ 3rd Test] at Kensington Oval, Bridgetown, Barbados – match drawn
- [ 4th Test] at Bourda, Georgetown – match drawn
- [ 5th Test] at Queen's Park Oval, Port of Spain, Trinidad – England won by 26 runs

=== India 1975–76 ===
- [ 1st Test] at Kensington Oval, Bridgetown, Barbados – West Indies won by an innings and 97 runs
- [ 2nd Test] at Queen's Park Oval, Port of Spain, Trinidad – match drawn
- [ 3rd Test] at Queen's Park Oval, Port of Spain, Trinidad – India won by 6 wickets
- [ 4th Test] at Sabina Park, Kingston – West Indies won by 10 wickets

=== Pakistan 1976–77 ===
- [ 1st Test] at Kensington Oval, Bridgetown, Barbados – match drawn
- [ 2nd Test] at Queen's Park Oval, Port of Spain, Trinidad – West Indies won by 6 wickets
- [ 3rd Test] at Bourda, Georgetown – match drawn
- [ 4th Test] at Queen's Park Oval, Port of Spain, Trinidad – Pakistan won by 266 runs
- [ 5th Test] at Sabina Park, Kingston – West Indies won by 140 runs

=== Australia 1977–78 ===
- [ 1st Test] at Queen's Park Oval, Port of Spain, Trinidad – West Indies won by an innings and 106 runs
- [ 2nd Test] at Kensington Oval, Bridgetown, Barbados – West Indies won by 9 wickets
- [ 3rd Test] at Bourda, Georgetown – Australia won by 3 wickets
- [ 4th Test] at Queen's Park Oval, Port of Spain, Trinidad – West Indies won by 198 runs
- [ 5th Test] at Sabina Park, Kingston – match drawn
