= Norbert Phillip =

West Indian cricketer (born 1948)

Personal information
- Full name: Norbert Phillip
- Born: 12 June 1948 (age 78); Bioche, Dominica
- Batting: Right-handed
- Bowling: Right-arm fast-medium

International information
- National side: West Indies
- Test debut (cap 168): 31 March 1978 v Australia
- Last Test: 2 February 1979 v India
- Only ODI (cap 31): 12 April 1978 v Australia

Domestic team information
- Years: Team
- 1969–1985: Windward Islands
- 1970–1980: Combined Islands
- 1978–1985: Essex

Career statistics
Competition	Tests	ODIs	FC	LA
Matches	9	1	230	182
Runs scored	297	0	7,013	2,450
Batting average	29.70	0.00	23.61	19.60
100s/50s	0/0	0/0	1/39	0/9
Top score	47	0	134	95
Balls bowled	1,820	42	33,993	8,038
Wickets	28	1	688	227
Bowling average	37.17	22.00	24.75	22.73
5 wickets in innings	0	0	30	1
10 wickets in match	0	0	2	0
Best bowling	4/48	1/22	7/33	6/13
Catches/stumpings	5/–	0/–	75/–	27/–
- Source: Cricket Archive, 18 October 2010

Norbert Phillip (born 12 June 1948) is a former cricketer. A bowling all-rounder, with many national players migrating to Kerry Packer's groundbreaking venture, he represented West Indies in nine Tests and one One Day International in the interim (1978 and 1979), also appearing in English county cricket for Essex (in 144 first-class matches) from 1978 until 1985.

== Domestic cricket ==
Domestically, Phillip appeared for the Combined Islands, playing 31 first-class matches; although he never hit a century for the Combined Islands (he had a highest score of 99), with 106 wickets he was the second-highest wicket taker for the team, one behind Andy Roberts. In 1977-8 he took 21 wickets at 17.71 and scored 230 runs at 76.66 for the Combined Islands, helping to earn his international selection. In 1983 he captained the Windward Islands (who by then had first-class status).

His first season at Essex in 1978 was a success, and he took 71 wickets at 22.40 and scored 645 runs at 26.87, including his only first-class century, 134 in a successful run chase against Gloucestershire. He was part of a successful Essex side which won the County Championship in 1979, 1983 and 1984, as well as the 1979 Benson & Hedges Cup, and the John Player League in 1981 and 1984. In 1983 he also starred in a remarkable match in which Surrey were all out for 14, taking figures of 6/4.

== International cricket ==
Phillip made his Test debut against Australia in 1978, in the context of World Series Cricket, taking six wickets on his Test debut.

In 1978-79 Phillip toured India with the West Indies, playing in all six Tests and taking 19 wickets at 34.21. His took his best Test innings and match bowling figures (4/48 and 7/85) in the 4th Test, although this match was also narrowly lost.
