= Basil Williams (cricketer) =

West Indian cricketer

Personal information
- Born: 21 November 1949; Caymanas Estate, Saint Catherine Parish, Jamaica
- Died: October 25, 2015 (aged 65); Atlanta, Georgia, U.S.
- Batting: Right-handed

International information
- National side: West Indies
- Test debut (cap 170): 31 March 1978 v Australia
- Last Test: 24 January 1979 v India

Domestic team information
- Years: Team
- 1969–1986: Jamaica

Career statistics
Competition	Test	FC	LA
Matches	7	46	20
Runs scored	469	2,702	506
Batting average	39.08	36.02	26.63
100s/50s	2/1	5/15	1/1
Top score	111	126*	89
Catches/stumpings	5/–	19/–	5/–
- Source: CricInfo, 20 May 2022

Alvadon Basil Williams (21 November 1949 – 25 October 2015) was a West Indian cricketer who played in seven Test matches from 1978 to 1979.

He was married to Patricia Williams and together they had two sons, Basil Williams and Germaine Williams. Germane is a rapper under the name Canibus.

He later had a daughter, Gabrielle Williams.
