= Mike Findlay =

West Indian cricketer (born 1943)

Personal information
- Full name: Thaddeus Michael Findlay
- Born: 19 October 1943 (age 83); Troumaca, Saint Vincent
- Batting: Right-handed
- Role: Wicket-keeper

International information
- National side: West Indies
- Test debut (cap 133): 26 June 1969 v England
- Last Test: 16 February 1973 v Australia

Domestic team information
- Years: Team
- 1965–1978: Windward Islands
- 1970–1978: Combined Islands

Career statistics
Competition	Test	FC	LA
Matches	10	110	9
Runs scored	212	2927	71
Batting average	16.30	20.18	11.83
100s/50s	0/0	0/14	0/0
Top score	44*	90	28
Catches/stumpings	19/2	209/43	2/1
- Source: CricketArchive, 3 January 2013

Thaddeus Michael "Mike" Findlay (born 19 October 1943 at Troumaca, Saint Vincent) is a former West Indian cricketer who played in ten Tests from 1969 to 1973 as a wicketkeeper.

When he toured Australia and New Zealand in 1968–69, Findlay became the first player from the Leeward and Windward Islands to represent the West Indies. (Alphonso Roberts came from St Vincent but was playing in Trinidad when he was selected for the West Indies team.) He also toured England in 1969 and 1976. Findlay says he found the experience and support of his teammates helpful when he entered the West Indies team: "I never forgot when I first went on tour with the West Indies team. An experienced player was given a younger player as his mentor. Wes Hall was a mentor to me. Jackie Hendriks was the No. 1 keeper, and Jackie would sit with me and pass on his experience."

Findlay played first-class cricket for the Windward Islands and the Combined Islands from 1965 to 1978. He captained both teams in most of their matches from 1970 to 1978.

After his career as a cricketer, Findlay became a journalist and commentated on matches. In 2002 he stepped down as Chairman of Selectors for the West Indies team. In 2007 he managed the West Indian team on its tour of England.

== See also ==
- List of West Indies Test wicket-keepers
