= Grayson Shillingford =

West Indian cricketer

Personal information
- Full name: Grayson Cleophas Shillingford
- Born: 25 September, 1944; Macoucherie, Dublanc, Dominica
- Died: 23 December 2009 (aged 65); Salisbury, Dominica
- Batting: Left-handed
- Bowling: Right-arm fast-medium
- Relatives: H. D. Shillingford (grandfather); Irvine Shillingford (cousin)

International information
- National side: West Indies
- Test debut: 26 June 1969 v England
- Last Test: 23 March 1972 v New Zealand

Career statistics
| Competition | Test | First-class |
|---|---|---|
| Matches | 7 | 81 |
| Runs scored | 57 | 791 |
| Batting average | 8.14 | 10.14 |
| 100s/50s | 0/0 | 0/0 |
| Top score | 25 | 42 |
| Balls bowled | 1,181 | 11,457 |
| Wickets | 15 | 217 |
| Bowling average | 35.79 | 26.54 |
| 5 wickets in innings | 0 | 6 |
| 10 wickets in match | 0 | 0 |
| Best bowling | 3/63 | 6/49 |
| Catches/stumpings | 2/– | 22/– |
- Source: Cricinfo, 10 September 2022

Grayson Cleophas Shillingford SAH (25 September 1944 – 23 December 2009) was a West Indian cricketer who played in seven Test matches from 1969 to 1972.

== Early life ==
Grayson Cleophas Shillingford was born on September 25, 1944, in Macoucherie, Dublanc, Dominica. He attended Dominica Grammar School in Roseau. His first cousin was Irvine Shillingford, who also played Test cricket for the West Indies.

== Career ==
He was a right-arm fast bowler who played for Windward Islands from 1967–68 to 1978–79. He toured England with the West Indies team in 1969 and 1973. His best first-class figures were 6 for 49 for the Combined Windward and Leeward Islands team against Trinidad in 1971–72.

== Honours ==
- He received Dominica's Sisserou Award of Honour in 2009.
- The Grayson Shillingford Stands are named in his honour at Windsor Park stadium in Dominica.

== Personal life ==
He moved to Canada after his cricket career ended and lived in Toronto for 24 years. He died on 23 December 2009 in Salisbury, Dominica.
