= Guyana national cricket team =

Sports team

Guyana

Personnel
- Captain: Tevin Imlach
- Coach: Ryan Hercules

Team information
- Colours: Green yellow red
- Founded: 1965
- Home ground: Providence Stadium
- Capacity: 15,000

History
- Four Day wins: 14 (plus 1 shared)
- Super50 Cup wins: 7 (plus 2 shared)
- CT20 wins: 1

The Guyana national cricket team is the representative first class cricket team of Guyana. The side does not take part in any international competitions, but rather in inter-regional competitions in the Caribbean, such as the Regional Four Day Competition and the Regional Super50), and the best players may be selected for the West Indies team, which plays international cricket and is the only team in the Americas with Test status. Guyana has participated in the South American Cricket Championship for some editions, but were represented by an overage "masters" team. The team competes under the franchise name Guyana Harpy Eagles.

Prominent cricketers who have played for Guyana include Devendra Bishoo, Basil Butcher, Shivnarine Chanderpaul, Colin Croft, Roy Fredericks, Lance Gibbs, Roger Harper, Carl Hooper, Leon Johnson, Alvin Kallicharran, Rohan Kanhai, Clive Lloyd, Veerasammy Permaul and Ramnaresh Sarwan.

== History ==
The cricket team has been known under two other names – first as Demerara (until 1899, but also during 1895), then as British Guiana until 1966 when Guyana became independent. As Demerara, they played in the first first-class cricket game in the West Indies, against Barbados in 1865. From 1971 until the mid-1980s two Guyanese regional sides competed in an annual first class match for the Jones Cup, later renamed the Guystac Trophy.

Guyana has won the West Indian regional first-class title a total of ten times (plus one shared title) since its inception in 1965–66, which ranks third Jamaica and Barbados.

In List A cricket, Guyana reached the final of the domestic competition four times in the early 2000s, but the last victory was in 2005–06. They have won a total of nine regional List A titles, including two shared titles, which is second only to Trinidad and Tobago with 12 titles (including one shared).

In June 2018, Guyana was named the Best First-Class Team of the Year at the annual Cricket West Indies' Awards. Guyana won the 2022–23 West Indies Championship to clinch their 12th title. They won four out of their five matches gaining 84 points in total.

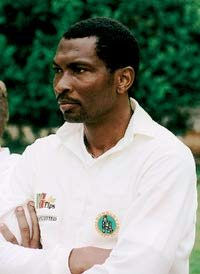
Roger Harper, cricketer turned coach

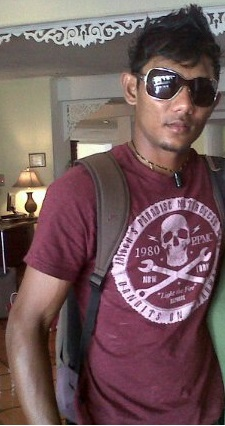
Devendra Bishoo played numerous games for the national cricket team of Guyana

== Grounds ==
Guyana's main home ground used to be the Bourda ground in Georgetown, where they played 131 of their 181 first class home games, and where 30 Test matches were hosted. As of 2007 Guyana have played most of their home matches at the Guyana National Stadium at Providence, East Bank Demerara. Other grounds include the Albion Sports Complex in the Berbice region, which has hosted 24 Guyana matches and five ODIs, and from 1997–98 the Enmore Recreation Ground, East Coast Demerara, where they have played five games.

== Squad ==
Listed below are players who have represented Guyana in either the 2018–19 Regional Four Day Competition or the 2018–19 Regional Super50. Players with international caps are listed in bold.

Name	Birth date	Batting style	Bowling style	Notes
Batsmen
**Leon Johnson**	8 August 1987 (age 38)	Left-handed	Right-arm leg spin	Captain
**Tagenarine Chanderpaul**	31 May 1996 (age 29)	Left-handed	Right-arm leg spin	
**Vishaul Singh**	12 January 1989 (age 37)	Left-handed	Left-arm orthodox	
Jonathan Foo	11 September 1990 (age 35)	Right-handed	Right-arm leg spin	
**Shimron Hetmyer**	26 December 1996 (age 29)	Left-handed	Right-arm leg spin	
All-rounders
**Christopher Barnwell**	6 January 1987 (age 39)	Right-handed	Right-arm medium-fast	
**Raymon Reifer**	11 May 1991 (age 34)	Left-handed	Left-arm medium-fast	
**Chandrapaul Hemraj**	3 September 1993 (age 32)	Left-handed	Right-arm leg spin	
Ronaldo Ali Mohamed	3 October 1998 (age 27)	Right-handed	Right-arm fast-medium	
Wicket-keepers
Anthony Bramble	11 December 1990 (age 35)	Right-handed		
Kemol Savory	27 September 1996 (age 29)	Left-handed		
Spin Bowlers
**Veerasammy Permaul**	11 August 1989 (age 36)	Right-handed	Left-arm orthodox	
Junior Sinclair	28 February 2001 (age 25)	Right-handed	Right-arm offbreak	
**Kevin Sinclair**	23 November 1999 (age 26)	Right-handed	Right-arm offbreak	Played for West Indies Emerging team in Super50
Ramaal Lewis	18 August 1996 (age 29)	Right-handed	Right-arm offbreak	
**Gudakesh Motie**	29 March 1995 (age 31)	Left-handed	Left-arm orthodox	
**Devendra Bishoo**	6 November 1985 (age 40)	Left-handed	Right-arm leg spin	
Pace Bowlers
Nial Smith	22 October 1995 (age 30)	Right-handed	Right-arm medium	
Keon Joseph	25 November 1991 (age 34)	Left-handed	Right-arm fast medium	
**Ronsford Beaton**	17 September 1992 (age 33)	Right-handed	Right-arm fast-medium	
Clinton Pestano	11 November 1992 (age 33)	Right-handed	Right-arm fast-medium	
**Keemo Paul**	21 February 1998 (age 28)	Right-handed	Right-arm fast-medium	
**Romario Shepherd**	26 November 1994 (age 31)	Right-handed	Right-arm medium-fast	

== Most runs for Guyana ==
Player	Runs	Average	Centuries
Shivnarine Chanderpaul	5746	63.14	17
Clayton Lambert	4680	48.75	14
Roy Fredericks	4344	70.06	15
Carl Hooper	3372	58.13	13
Clive Lloyd	3102	66.00	12

== Honours ==
- Regional Four Day Competition (12): 1972–73, 1974–75, 1982–83, 1986–87, 1992–93, 1997–98 (shared), 2014-15, 2015-16, 2016-17, 2017-18, 2018-19, 2022–23, 2023–24, 2024–25
- Domestic one-day competition (9): 1979–80, 1982–83, 1984–85, 1992–93 (shared), 1995–96 (shared), 1998–99, 2001–02, 2003–04, 2005–06
- Caribbean Twenty20 (1): 2010
- Inter-Colonial Tournament (defunct) (5): 1895–96, 1929–30, 1934–35, 1935–36, 1937–38
- Stanford 20/20 (defunct) (1): 2006

== Tournament history ==
=== South American Championship ===
- 1999: 2nd place
- 2000: 5th place
- 2004: 1st place
- 2007: 1st place

== See also ==
- List of Guyanese representative cricketers
- List of international cricketers from Guyana
