= History of cricket in the West Indies from 1945–46 to 1970 =

This article describes the history of West Indies cricket from 1946 to 1970.

First-class cricket in the West Indies had begun in February 1865 and the federation began playing Test cricket in 1928, but it was not until the 1965–66 West Indian cricket season that a formal domestic competition was founded, this being the Shell Shield which has subsequently evolved into the Carib Beer Cup.

== Post-war cricket to 1970 ==
West Indies cricket received a tremendous boost when its team defeated England in the 1950 Test series. The preceding few years had seen the emergence of truly great players like Frank Worrell, Everton Weekes and Clyde Walcott, and Gary Sobers followed during the 1950s.

In 1965, Shell Oil sponsored its Shell Shield and the West Indies at last had a true domestic championship. At first the new competition involved Barbados, British Guiana, Jamaica, Trinidad & Tobago and the Combined Islands team which was an amalgam of Leeward Islands cricket team and Windward Islands cricket team.

=== Shell Shield winners to 1970 ===
- 1965–66 Barbados
- 1966–67 Barbados
- 1967–68 no competition
- 1968–69 Jamaica
- 1969–70 Trinidad and Tobago

=== International tours to 1970 ===
==== England 1947–48 ====
- 1st Test at Kensington Oval, Bridgetown, Barbados – match drawn
- 2nd Test at Queen's Park Oval, Port of Spain, Trinidad – match drawn
- 3rd Test at Bourda, Georgetown – West Indies won by 7 wickets
- 4th Test at Sabina Park, Kingston – West Indies won by 10 wickets

==== India 1952–53 ====
- 1st Test at Queen's Park Oval, Port of Spain, Trinidad – match drawn
- 2nd Test at Kensington Oval, Bridgetown, Barbados – West Indies won by 142 runs
- 3rd Test at Queen's Park Oval, Port of Spain, Trinidad – match drawn
- 4th Test at Bourda, Georgetown – match drawn
- 5th Test at Sabina Park, Kingston – match drawn

==== England 1953–54 ====
- 1st Test at Sabina Park, Kingston – West Indies won by 140 runs
- 2nd Test at Kensington Oval, Bridgetown, Barbados – West Indies won by 181 runs
- 3rd Test at Bourda, Georgetown – England won by 9 wickets
- 4th Test at Queen's Park Oval, Port of Spain, Trinidad – match drawn
- 5th Test at Sabina Park, Kingston – England won by 9 wickets

==== Australia 1954–55 ====
- 1st Test at Sabina Park, Kingston – Australia won by 9 wickets
- 2nd Test at Queen's Park Oval, Port of Spain, Trinidad – match drawn
- 3rd Test at Bourda, Georgetown – Australia won by 8 wickets
- 4th Test at Kensington Oval, Bridgetown, Barbados – match drawn
- 5th Test at Sabina Park, Kingston – Australia won by an innings and 82 runs

==== E. W. Swanton's XI 1955–56 ====
In March and April 1956 E. W. Swanton's XI of English Test and county players played two first-class matches against Barbados, one against Trinidad, and one against a West Indies XI, as well as three non-first-class matches.

==== Duke of Norfolk's XI 1956–57 ====
In February and March 1957 the Duke of Norfolk's XI of English Test and county players visited Jamaica, playing three first-class matches against Jamaica, winning two and drawing the other, as well as seven non-first-class matches.

==== Pakistan 1957–58 ====
- 1st Test at Kensington Oval, Bridgetown, Barbados – match drawn
- 2nd Test at Queen's Park Oval, Port of Spain, Trinidad – West Indies won by 120 runs
- 3rd Test at Sabina Park, Kingston – West Indies won by an innings and 174 runs
- 4th Test at Bourda, Georgetown – West Indies won by 8 wickets
- 5th Test at Queen's Park Oval, Port of Spain, Trinidad – Pakistan won by an innings and 1 run

==== England 1959–60 ====
- 1st Test at Kensington Oval, Bridgetown, Barbados – match drawn
- 2nd Test at Queen's Park Oval, Port of Spain, Trinidad – England won by 256 runs
- 3rd Test at Sabina Park, Kingston – match drawn
- 4th Test at Bourda, Georgetown – match drawn
- 5th Test at Queen's Park Oval, Port of Spain, Trinidad – match drawn

==== E. W. Swanton's XI 1960–61 ====
In March and April 1961 E. W. Swanton's XI of English Test and county players, plus a few internationals, played first-class matches against Windward Islands, Berbice, British Guiana and Trinidad, as well as five non-first-class matches.

==== India 1961–62 ====
- 1st Test at Queen's Park Oval, Port of Spain, Trinidad – West Indies won by 10 wickets
- 2nd Test at Sabina Park, Kingston – West Indies won by an innings and 18 runs
- 3rd Test at Kensington Oval, Bridgetown, Barbados – West Indies won by an innings and 30 runs
- 4th Test at Queen's Park Oval, Port of Spain, Trinidad – West Indies won by 7 wickets
- 5th Test at Sabina Park, Kingston – West Indies won by 123 runs

==== Australia 1964–65 ====
- 1st Test at Sabina Park, Kingston – West Indies won by 179 runs
- 2nd Test at Queen's Park Oval, Port of Spain, Trinidad – match drawn
- 3rd Test at Bourda, Georgetown – West Indies won by 212 runs
- 4th Test at Kensington Oval, Bridgetown, Barbados – match drawn
- 5th Test at Queen's Park Oval, Port of Spain, Trinidad – Australia won by 10 wickets

==== Rest of the World XI in Barbados 1966–67 ====
As part of Barbados's independence celebrations, a strong team of Test players from six countries visited Barbados in March 1967 and played a first-class match and a one-day 40-over match against Barbados. The World team won both matches.

==== England 1967–68 ====
- 1st Test at Queen's Park Oval, Port of Spain, Trinidad – match drawn
- 2nd Test at Sabina Park, Kingston – match drawn
- 3rd Test at Kensington Oval, Bridgetown, Barbados – match drawn
- 4th Test at Queen's Park Oval, Port of Spain, Trinidad – England won by 7 wickets
- 5th Test at Bourda, Georgetown – match drawn

==== Duke of Norfolk's XI 1969–70 ====
In February and March 1970 the Duke of Norfolk's XI of English Test and county players played first-class matches against Windward Islands, Trinidad and Barbados, as well as six non-first-class matches.

== External sources ==
- CricketArchive – itinerary of events
