= Andy Roberts (cricketer) =

West Indian cricketer

Sir Andy Roberts KCN
Personal information
- Full name: Anderson Montgomery Everton Roberts
- Born: 29 January 1951 (age 75); Urlings, Saint Mary, Antigua and Barbuda
- Nickname: Hit Man
- Height: 6 ft 2 in (1.88 m)
- Batting: Right-handed
- Bowling: Right-arm fast
- Role: Bowler

International information
- National side: West Indies (1974–1983)
- Test debut (cap 149): 6 March 1974 v England
- Last Test: 24 December 1983 v India
- ODI debut (cap 15): 7 June 1975 v Sri Lanka
- Last ODI: 7 December 1983 v India

Domestic team information
- Years: Team
- 1970–1984: Leeward Islands
- 1970–1981: Combined Islands
- 1973–1978: Hampshire
- 1976: New South Wales
- 1981–1984: Leicestershire

Career statistics
Competition	Test	ODI	FC	LA
Matches	47	56	228	195
Runs scored	762	231	3,516	1,091
Batting average	14.94	10.04	15.69	14.54
100s/50s	0/3	0/0	0/10	0/1
Top score	68	37*	89	81*
Balls bowled	11,135	3,123	42,760	9,841
Wickets	202	87	889	274
Bowling average	25.61	20.35	21.01	18.58
5 wickets in innings	11	1	47	2
10 wickets in match	2	0	7	0
Best bowling	7/54	5/22	8/47	5/13
Catches/stumpings	9/–	6/–	52/–	33/–
Medal record
Men's Cricket
Representing West Indies
ICC Cricket World Cup
Winner	1975 England
Winner	1979 England
Runner-up	1983 England and Wales
- Source: CricketArchive, 12 January 2009

Sir Anderson Montgomery Everton Roberts, KCN (born 29 January 1951) is an Antiguan former first-class cricketer who is considered the father of modern West Indian fast bowling. Roberts played Test cricket for the West Indies, twice taking seven wickets in a Test innings, and was a member of the team that won both the 1975 Cricket World Cup and the 1979 Cricket World Cup respectively, as well as finishing as runners-up at the 1983 Cricket World Cup. Arriving in England in 1972, he played first-class cricket for Hampshire County Cricket Club and then later for Leicestershire County Cricket Club.

Roberts was the first Antiguan to play Test cricket for the West Indies, thus leading the way for many of his famous countrymen including Viv Richards, Richie Richardson, and Curtly Ambrose. In 2009, Roberts was inducted into the ICC Cricket Hall of Fame.

== International career ==
Roberts formed part of the "quartet" of West Indian fast bowlers from the mid-70s to the early 80s (the others being Michael Holding, Joel Garner, and Colin Croft) that had such a devastating effect on opposition batsmen at both Test and One Day International level. He was also part of the West Indies team that won the first two Prudential World Cups in England in 1975 and 1979.

By his own reckoning, the best spell Roberts ever delivered was during the Headingley Test of the West Indies' 1976 tour of England: "I only got three wickets, but in my mind there was a decision given against me. It was a leg-before decision against Peter Willey, where he played right back onto his stumps to a fuller delivery. I would've bowled England out that afternoon if the umpire had given me the decision." Despite an excellent record in Tests his international career was relatively short and ended in 1983. Imran Khan (former captain Pakistan national cricket team) once described a ball bowled to him by Andy Roberts as the fastest and most terrifying he had ever faced.

One of his trademarks was the use of two different bouncers. One was delivered at a slower pace and was often dealt with quite easily by the batsman. However, this was a ploy by Roberts to lull the batsman into a false sense of security. Roberts would then deliver the second bouncer, pitching in a similar spot to the first, but delivered at far greater pace. The batsman would attempt to play this delivery in the same fashion as the first slower bouncer only to be surprised by the extra pace and bounce of the ball. Many batsmen were dismissed, and many more struck painful blows, by Roberts using this ploy.

Roberts was also the part of the West Indies team which ended up as runners-up in the 1983 ICC Cricket World Cup.

John Snow believes that Roberts saw reduced effectiveness after being overbowled during 1974 by Hampshire and West Indies.

== After cricket ==
Roberts' contribution to West Indies cricket has continued since his retirement as a player. As an administrator overseeing the preparation of pitches, he helped prepare the pitches in Antigua on which Brian Lara twice broke the world record for highest Test scores.

Roberts worked with Bangladesh's fast bowlers in 2001 and again in 2005, and also helped coach India's seam bowling all-rounder Irfan Pathan in 2006. He joined the West Indies Cricket Board selection panel in July 2006. In 2008 he was one of 12 former West Indies cricketers who made up the 'Stanford Legends' who promoted the Stanford 20/20.

Roberts was appointed a Knight Commander of the Order of the Nation (KCN) by the Antiguan Barbudan government on 28 February 2014.

== Criticism of the ICC and India's influence ==
In March 2025, Roberts publicly criticized the ICC, alleging that the Board of Control for Cricket in India (BCCI) exerted disproportionate influence over the global governing body. His remarks were made in the lead-up to the 2025 ICC Champions Trophy, which was scheduled to be hosted by Pakistan. Roberts expressed concern over reports that India would play all of its matches in Dubai, rather than traveling within the host nation. He argued that such an arrangement was contrary to the principles of fair competition, stating, "At the Champions Trophy, India did not have to travel at all. How can a team not travel during a tournament? It is not fair, it's not cricket. There has to be a level playing field."

Roberts also suggested that the ICC was increasingly accommodating to Indian interests, remarking, "To me, the ICC stands for the Indian Cricket Board. India dictates everything. If tomorrow, India says, 'listen there should be no no-balls and wides,' take my word, the ICC will find a way to satisfy India." He further cited the 2024 ICC Men's T20 World Cup, alleging that India had prior knowledge of its semi-final venue, which he viewed as evidence of structural imbalance. According to Roberts, "Cricket ought not to be a one-country sport. It now looks like a one-nation competition and the playing field is not level."
