= History of cricket in the West Indies from 1990–91 to 2000 =

This article describes the history of West Indies cricket from 1991 to 2000.

Outstanding players during this period were Brian Lara, Courtney Walsh, Curtly Ambrose and Jimmy Adams.

== Domestic cricket 1990–91 to 2000 ==
=== Shell Shield winners ===
- 1990–91 Barbados
- 1991–92 Jamaica
- 1992–93 Guyana
- 1993–94 Leeward Islands
- 1994–95 Barbados
- 1995–96 Leeward Islands
- 1996–97 Barbados
- 1997–98 Leeward Islands shared with Guyana
- 1998–99 Barbados
- 1999–2000 Jamaica

== International tours 1990–91 to 2000 ==
=== Australia 1990–91 ===
- 1st Test at Sabina Park, Kingston – match drawn
- 2nd Test at Bourda, Georgetown – West Indies won by 10 wickets
- 3rd Test at Queen's Park Oval, Port of Spain, Trinidad – match drawn
- 4th Test at Kensington Oval, Bridgetown, Barbados – West Indies won by 343 runs
- 5th Test at Antigua Recreation Ground, St John's – Australia won by 157 runs

=== South Africa 1991–92 ===
- 1st Test at Kensington Oval, Bridgetown, Barbados – West Indies won by 52 runs

=== Pakistan 1992–93 ===
- 1st Test at Queen's Park Oval, Port of Spain, Trinidad – West Indies won by 204 runs
- 2nd Test at Kensington Oval, Bridgetown, Barbados – West Indies won by 10 wickets
- 3rd Test at Antigua Recreation Ground, St John's – match drawn

=== England 1993–94 ===
- 1st Test at Sabina Park, Kingston – West Indies won by 8 wickets
- 2nd Test at Bourda, Georgetown – West Indies won by an innings and 44 runs
- 3rd Test at Queen's Park Oval, Port of Spain, Trinidad – West Indies won by 147 runs
- 4th Test at Kensington Oval, Bridgetown, Barbados – England won by 208 runs
- 5th Test at Antigua Recreation Ground, St John's – match drawn

=== Australia 1994–95 ===
The West Indians went into the series having not lost a series in 15 years.

- 1st Test at Kensington Oval, Bridgetown, Barbados – Australia won by 10 wickets. The tourists' underdog status was amplified by pre-Test injuries to fast bowlers Craig McDermott and Damien Fleming. "Still, we somehow managed to catch them on the hop", wrote Paul Reiffel. Victory was secured within 3 days.
- 2nd Test at Antigua Recreation Ground, St John's – match drawn.
- 3rd Test at Queen's Park Oval, Port of Spain, Trinidad – West Indies won by 9 wickets. Having endured substantial criticism from an enraged fourth estate for their lustreless display in the First Test, Curtly Ambrose and Courtney Walsh, the Caribbean's last great fast-bowling pair, lifted the ante and biffed the Australians with a barrage of short-pitched bowling. It was, wrote Reiffel, "one of the greenest wickets I ever saw". Steve Waugh knocked up a courageous 63 in the first innings, priming him for his legendary effort in Jamaica.
- 4th Test at Sabina Park, Kingston – Australia won by an innings and 53 runs. The final Test arrived with the scoreline one-all, and the crowd came out in force. "They were noisy, knew their cricket, and could be intimidating if you gave them room", Reiffel recalled. "[T]he bowl was resounding in anticipation [...]." The Australian strategy was to occupy the crease and compile as large a total as possible, fearing the fourth-innings pitch. Steve Waugh, coming in at 73 for three, joined his brother Mark, "batted magnificently and built a fortress strong enough to keep West Indies at bay. Mark nonchalantly scored a beautiful century before getting out, but by then he had helped Steve build a solid platform." Inspired by Waugh's intrepid double century and the West Indies' depleted psychological funds, Reiffel picked up three quick wickets on the second-last evening. By the reckoning of Reiffel, it was this match – and, more specifically, Waugh's century, "one of the greatest feats of batting I ever witnessed" – which signified the transition of cricketing supremacy from the West Indies to Australia. It also secured the Frank Worrell Trophy.

=== New Zealand 1995–96 ===
- 1st Test at Kensington Oval, Bridgetown, Barbados – West Indies won by 10 wickets
- 2nd Test at Antigua Recreation Ground, St John's – match drawn

=== India 1996–97 ===
- 1st Test at Sabina Park, Kingston – match drawn
- 2nd Test at Queen's Park Oval, Port of Spain, Trinidad – match drawn
- 3rd Test at Kensington Oval, Bridgetown, Barbados – West Indies won by 38 runs
- 4th Test at Antigua Recreation Ground, St John's – match drawn
- 5th Test at Bourda, Georgetown – match drawn

=== Sri Lanka 1996–97 ===
- 1st Test at Antigua Recreation Ground, St John's – West Indies won by 6 wickets
- 2nd Test at Arnos Vale Ground, Kingstown – match drawn

=== England 1997–98 ===
- 1st Test at Sabina Park, Kingston – match drawn
- 2nd Test at Queen's Park Oval, Port of Spain, Trinidad – West Indies won by 3 wickets
- 3rd Test at Queen's Park Oval, Port of Spain, Trinidad – England won by 3 wickets
- 4th Test at Bourda, Georgetown – West Indies won by 242 runs
- 5th Test at Kensington Oval, Bridgetown, Barbados – match drawn
- [ 6th Test] at Antigua Recreation Ground, St John's – West Indies won by an innings and 52 runs

=== Australia 1998–99 CI Link ===
- 1st Test at Queen's Park Oval, Port of Spain, Trinidad – Australia won by 312 runs
- 2nd Test at Sabina Park, Kingston – West Indies won by 10 wickets
- 3rd Test at Kensington Oval, Bridgetown, Barbados – West Indies won by 1 wicket
- 4th Test at Antigua Recreation Ground, St John's – Australia won by 176 runs

=== Zimbabwe 1999–2000 ===
- 1st Test at Queen's Park Oval, Port of Spain, Trinidad – West Indies won by 35 runs
- 2nd Test at Sabina Park, Kingston – West Indies won by 10 wickets

=== Pakistan 1999–2000 ===
- 1st Test at Bourda, Georgetown – match drawn
- 2nd Test at Kensington Oval, Bridgetown, Barbados – match drawn
- 3rd Test at Antigua Recreation Ground, St John's – West Indies won by 1 wicket

== See also ==
- Wisden Cricketers' Almanack
- List of calypso songs about cricket - 1990 to 2000

== External sources ==
- CricketArchive – itinerary of events
