= Barbados national cricket team =

Sports team that represents Barbados

Barbados

Personnel
- Captain: Kraigg Brathwaite (First class), Shai Hope (List A)
- Coach: Vasbert Drakes

Team information
- Colours: Blue, Gold, Black
- Home ground: Kensington Oval
- Capacity: 28,000

History
- Four Day wins: 23 (plus 1 shared)
- Super50 Cup wins: 7 (plus 1 shared)
- CT20 wins: 0
- Official website: barbadoscricket.org

The Barbados national cricket team is the national cricket team of Barbados, organised by the Barbados Cricket Association (BCA). Barbados is a member of the West Indies Cricket Board (WICB), which is a member of the International Cricket Council (ICC) in its own right, and Barbadians play internationally for the West Indies cricket team.

Barbados does not take part in any international competitions (the 1998 Commonwealth Games tournament being an exception), but rather in inter-regional competitions in the Caribbean, such as the Professional Cricket League (which includes the Regional Four Day Competition and the Regional Super50). The team competes in the Professional Cricket League under the franchise name Barbados Pride.

The most prominent Barbadian cricketers, all of whom have played for the West Indies, include Conrad Hunte, Wes Hall, Charlie Griffith, David Holford, Joel Garner, Gordon Greenidge, Desmond Haynes, Jason Holder, Malcolm Marshall, Garry Sobers, Seymour Nurse, Kemar Roach, Wayne Daniel, Shai Hope, Clyde Walcott, Everton Weekes and Frank Worrell.

== History ==
=== Colonial era ===
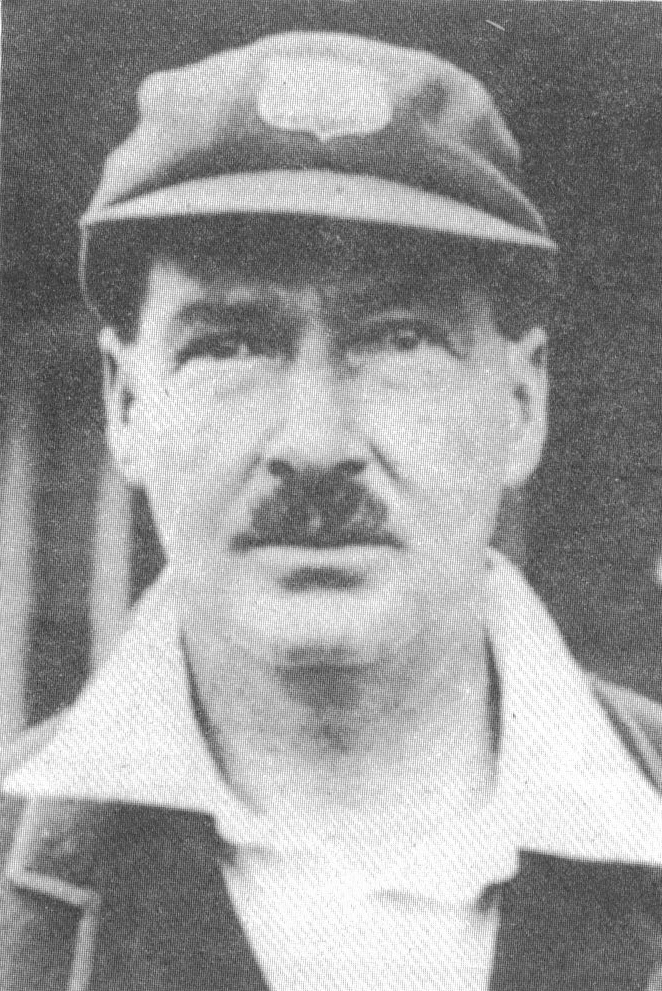
George Challenor, a Barbadian, was regarded as the "first of the great West Indian batsmen".

Cricket in Barbados dates from at least the late 18th century, with the Barbados cricket buckle depicting a slave playing cricket around 1780. In February 1865, Barbados took part in what was later designated the inaugural first-class match in the West Indies, hosting Demerara (now Guyana) at the Garrison Savannah in Bridgetown. Barbados won the match by 138 runs, but lost the return fixture, played in Georgetown later in the year, by two wickets. In September 1891, the Inter-Colonial Tournament was inaugurated, which saw Barbados, British Guiana, and Trinidad engaged in regular competition for the first time. The tournament was played every two seasons until the 1907–08 season, and annually until the 1938–39 season (with a gap during World War I). Barbados won the tournament 11 out of the 28 times it was played, and only failed to make the final on five occasions.

In January 1888, Barbados played their first match against a team that was not another British colony in the West Indies, appearing in a fixture against an amateur team representing the United States. That match was not classed as first-class, but the 1890s saw several tours from English sides that were granted first-class status. In 1896, Barbados also played against Jamaica for the first time, winning by an innings and eight runs. (Note: Jamaica never competed in the Inter-Colonial Tournament, with its distance from the other colonies making participation uneconomical until the advent of air travel.) A representative West Indies team was organised for the first time in 1897, to play a touring English team led by Arthur Priestley. The inaugural team included three Barbadians – Harold Austin, Donald McAuley, and Clifford Goodman. Austin, a future speaker of the Barbados House of Assembly, later became the first Barbadian to captain the West Indies, doing so in January 1902 against another English team, led by Richard Bennet.

The West Indies played their first Test matches on a 1928 tour of England, with five members of the 17-man touring party being Barbadians. The most experienced Barbadian on tour was the 40-year-old George Challenor, who has been called the "first of the great West Indian batsmen". The first Barbadian to captain the West Indies in a Test match was Teddy Hoad, who did so when England toured during the 1929–30 season. That match was played at Bridgetown's Kensington Oval, and was the first Test to be held in the West Indies. When the West Indies toured Australia for the first time during the 1930–31 season, another Barbadian, Herman Griffith, became the first bowler to dismiss Don Bradman for a Test match duck.

In February 1946, two Barbadian batsmen, Clyde Walcott and Frank Worrell, set a new record for the highest partnership in first-class cricket, putting on 574 not out against Trinidad. (Note: The pair's record for the highest partnership stood for just over a year, until two Indians, Vijay Hazare and Gul Mohammad, put on 577 runs for Baroda against Holkar in March 1947.) Walcott, Worrell, and another Barbadian, Everton Weekes, all made their Test debuts during England's 1947–48 tour of the West Indies. The trio eventually became known as the "three Ws", and as "one of the greatest middle-order line-ups the game has ever seen", were key members of the West Indies from the late 1940s through to the late 1950s. All three eventually received knighthoods, and were inaugural inductees into the ICC Hall of Fame in 2009. Worrell was especially esteemed as the first black man to captain the West Indies, doing so on the team's 1960–61 tour of Australia. He was succeeded as captain by another Barbadian, Garfield Sobers, whose 365 not out against Pakistan in 1958 set a record for the highest Test score that was not passed for another 36 years.

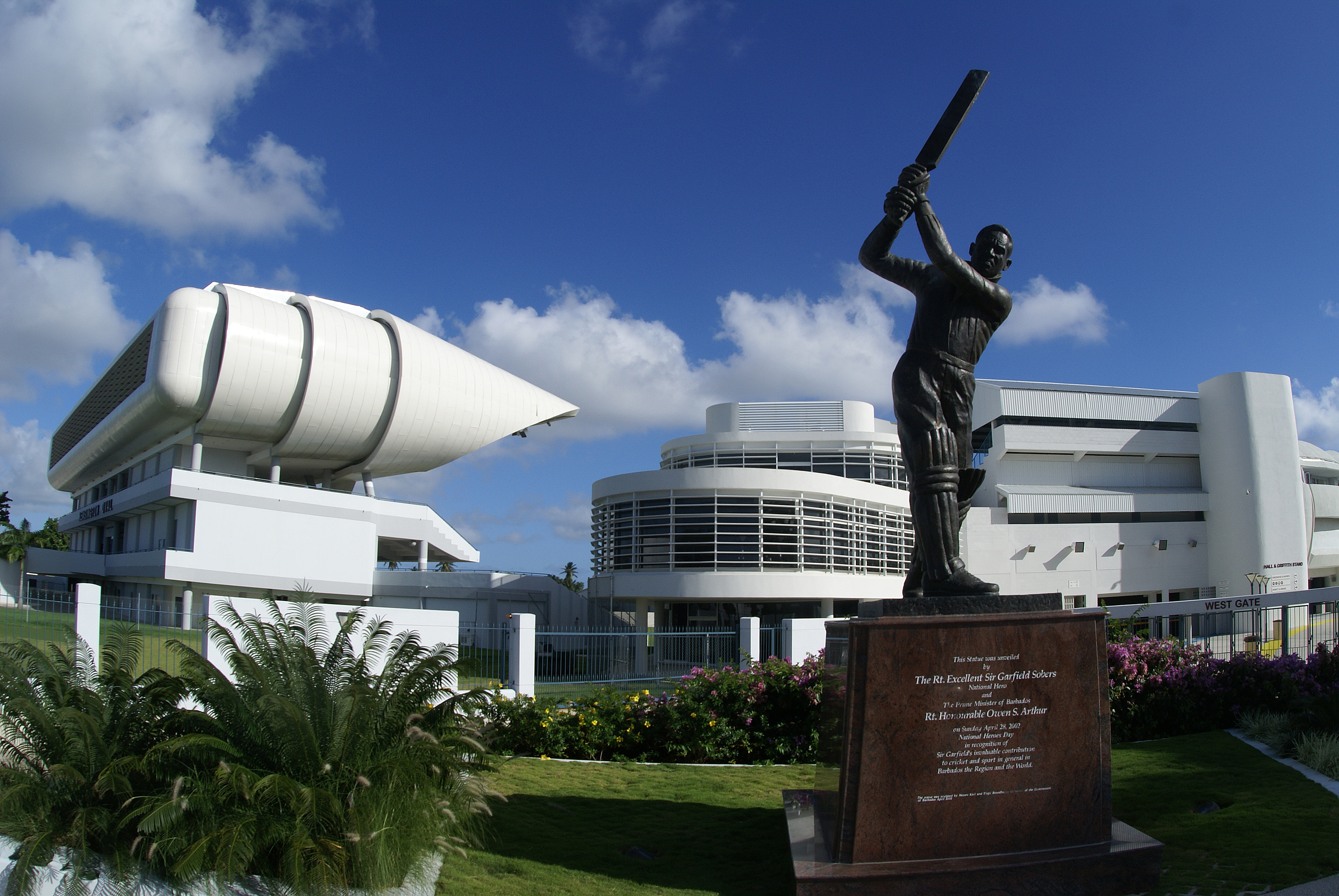
The exterior of Kensington Oval, Bridgetown, features a statue of Sir Garfield Sobers, who has scored more Test runs than any other Barbadian.

=== Post-independence ===
Barbados gained full independence on 30 November 1966, having earlier been a part of the short-lived West Indies Federation (between 1958 and 1962). The inaugural season of the Shell Shield had been played earlier in the year (and won by Barbados), marking the return of a formal first-class structure for the first time since 1939, when the last Inter-Colonial Tournament was played. In 1973, Barbados also won the inaugural edition of what is now the Regional Super50, the West Indian limited-overs competition. Barbados were the dominant team throughout the early years of the Shell Shield, winning 12 out of the first 20 editions (including five consecutively from the 1975–76 season to the 1979–80 season). In the one-day format, Barbados won the first three editions of the tournament, but did not secure a fourth title until the 1987–88 season, and a fifth title until the 2002–03 season.

The West Indian teams that won the 1975 and 1979 World Cups included three and four Barbadians, respectively. Joel Garner, who took a five-wicket haul against England in the 1979 final, was a Barbadian, as was Malcolm Marshall, who was in the squad but did not play any matches. Marshall, who had only made his Test debut the previous year, was one of the world's leading fast bowlers during the 1980s, and established a new record for the most Test wickets taken by a West Indian (since beaten by Courtney Walsh). The West Indian opening batsmen throughout the 1980s were Gordon Greenidge and Desmond Haynes, both Barbadians. Greenidge and Haynes opened the batting together in 148 innings between 1978 and 1991, and put on 6,482 runs together, both records for opening batsmen that have yet to be beaten.

At the 1998 Commonwealth Games in Kuala Lumpur, Malaysia, Barbados and the other West Indian teams participated individually in the cricket tournament, held for the first and only time. Barbados easily defeated Northern Ireland and Bangladesh, but lost to South Africa in their final group-stage match to miss out on qualification for the semi-finals. The team's participation in the Commonwealth Games coincided with a period of superiority at domestic first-class level – from the 1994–95 season through to the 2003–04 season, the team won six out of ten titles. Internationally, Floyd Reifer captained the West Indies in a 2009 Test series against Bangladesh, the first Barbadian to do so since Desmond Haynes in 1990. However, his appointment was only temporary, coming during a players' strike. Jason Holder, who was appointed Test captain in 2015, is the most recent Barbadian to serve as captain of the West Indies.

== Current squad ==
Players with international caps are listed in bold.

Name	Birth date	Batting style	Bowling style	Notes
Batsmen
**Jonathan Carter**	16 November 1987 (age 38)	Left-handed	Right-arm medium	
**Kraigg Brathwaite**	1 December 1992 (age 33)	Right-handed	Right-arm for spin	**First-class Captain** and captain of the West Indies in Test cricket
**Shamarh Brooks**	1 October 1988 (age 38)	Right-handed	Right-arm leg spin	
**Shayne Moseley**	11 April 1994 (age 32)	Left-handed	Right-arm medium	
**Kjorn Ottley**	9 December 1989 (age 36)	Left-handed	Right-arm off spin	
**Nicholas Kirton**	6 May 1998 (age 28)	Right-handed	-	Plays international cricket for Canada
Leniko Boucher	13 September 1997 (age 29)	Right-handed	-	
Roshon Primus	14 August 1995 (age 31)	Left-handed	Right-arm medium	
All-rounders
**Kyle Mayers**	8 September 1992 (age 34)	Left-handed	Right-arm medium	
Justin Greaves	26 April 1994 (age 32)	Right-handed	Right-arm medium	Played for West Indies Emerging team in Super50
Shamar Springer	26 November 1997 (age 28)	Right-handed	Right-arm fast-medium	
**Jason Holder**	5 November 1991 (age 35)	Right-handed	Right-arm medium-fast	
**Roston Chase**	22 March 1992 (age 34)	Right-handed	Right-arm off spin	
Wicket-keepers
Tevyn Walcott	25 November 1994 (age 31)	Right-handed	-	
**Shane Dowrich**	30 October 1991 (age 35)	Right-handed	-	
**Shai Hope**	10 November 1993 (age 32)	Right-handed	-	**List A Captain**
Spin Bowlers
**Ashley Nurse**	22 December 1988 (age 37)	Right-handed	Right-arm off spin	
**Jomel Warrican**	20 May 1992 (age 34)	Right-handed	Left-arm orthodox	
Joshua Bishop	30 May 2000 (age 26)	Right-handed	Left-arm orthodox	
Pace Bowlers
**Chemar Holder**	3 May 1998 (age 28)	Right-handed	Right-arm fast	
Keon Harding	1 November 1996 (age 30)	Right-handed	Right-arm medium	Played for West Indies Emerging team in Super50
**Kemar Roach**	30 June 1988 (age 38)	Right-handed	Right-arm fast	
**Miguel Cummins**	5 September 1990 (age 36)	Left-handed	Right-arm fast	
**Carlos Brathwaite**	18 July 1988 (age 38)	Right-handed	Right-arm fast-medium	Played for Combined Campuses and Colleges in Super50

Source: Regional Four Day Competition, Regional Super50

== Venues ==
Location of grounds in Barbados (Kensington Oval marked K, Foursquare Park not shown)

The primary venue for Barbados is Bridgetown's Kensington Oval, which has a capacity of 28,000 people. Kensington Oval is the only ground in the country to have hosted international cricket (Tests, One Day Internationals, or Twenty20 Internationals), and was the venue for the final of the 2007 World Cup. An additional nine grounds have hosted Barbados home matches (with either first-class or List A status), listed below in order of first use:

1. Garrison Savannah, Bridgetown (1865)
2. Bay Pasture, Bridgetown (1883)
3. Desmond Haynes Oval, Black Rock (1996)
4. Windward Park, Lucas Street (2000)
5. Mount Gay North Stars Cricket Ground, Crab Hill (2003)
6. 3Ws Oval, Cave Hill (2004)
7. Banks Sports and Cultural Club, Wildey (2005)
8. Cable and Wireless Sports Club Ground, Wildey (2005)
9. Police Sports Club Ground, Weymouth (2005)

One other ground in Barbados has hosted first-class cricket without hosting any home games for Barbados – Foursquare Park, in Highland.

== Honours ==
- Regional Four Day Competition (24): 1965–66, 1966–67, 1971–72, 1973–74, 1975–76 (shared), 1976–77, 1977–78, 1978–79, 1979–80, 1981–82, 1983–84, 1985–86, 1990–91, 1994–95, 1996–97, 1998–99, 2000–01, 2002–03, 2003–04, 2006-07, 2012-13, 2013-14, 2019-20, 2021-22
- Domestic one-day competition (8): 1972–73, 1975–76, 1976–77, 1987–88, 2002–03, 2010–11 (shared), 2013-14, 2016-17
- Inter-Colonial Tournament (defunct) (11): 1891–92, 1893–94, 1897–98, 1899–1900, 1905–06, 1908–09, 1910–11, 1911–12, 1922–23, 1923–24, 1926–27

== Tournament history ==
=== Commonwealth Games ===
Commonwealth Games record
Year	Round	Position	GP	W	L	T	NR
(Malaysia) 1998	Group stage	6/16	3	2	1	0	0
Total	0 Title	1/1	3	2	1	0	0

== See also ==
- Barbados Cricket Association (BCA)
- Barbados Tridents
- List of international cricketers from Barbados
- Sport in Barbados
- List of Barbadian representative cricketers
