= History of cricket in the West Indies from 2000–01 =

This article describes the history of West Indies cricket from 2000–01. West Indian cricket has struggled in the early 21st century.

== Domestic cricket from 2000-01 ==
=== Shell Shield winners ===
- 2000-01 Barbados
- 2001-02 Jamaica
- 2002-03 Barbados
- 2003-04 Barbados
- 2004-05 Jamaica
- 2005-06 Trinidad and Tobago
- 2006-07 Trinidad and Tobago

For details of the 2005–06 season, see : 2005-06 West Indian cricket season

== International tours from 2000-01 ==
=== South Africa 2000-01 ===
- [ 1st Test] at Bourda, Georgetown – match drawn
- [ 2nd Test] at Queen's Park Oval, Port of Spain, Trinidad – South Africa won by 69 runs
- [ 3rd Test] at Kensington Oval, Bridgetown, Barbados – match drawn
- [ 4th Test] at Antigua Recreation Ground, St John's – South Africa won by 82 runs
- [ 5th Test] at Sabina Park, Kingston – West Indies won by 130 runs

=== India 2001-02 ===
- [ 1st Test] at Bourda, Georgetown – match drawn
- [ 2nd Test] at Queen's Park Oval, Port of Spain, Trinidad – India won by 37 runs
- [ 3rd Test] at Kensington Oval, Bridgetown, Barbados – West Indies won by 10 wickets
- [ 4th Test] at Antigua Recreation Ground, St John's – match drawn
- [ 5th Test] at Sabina Park, Kingston – West Indies won by 155 runs

=== New Zealand 2002 ===
- [ 1st Test] at Kensington Oval, Bridgetown, Barbados – New Zealand won by 204 runs
- [ 2nd Test] at Queen's Park (New), St George's – match drawn

=== Australia 2002-03 ===
- [ 1st Test] at Bourda, Georgetown – Australia won by 9 wickets
- [ 2nd Test] at Queen's Park Oval, Port of Spain, Trinidad – Australia won by 118 runs
- [ 3rd Test] at Kensington Oval, Bridgetown, Barbados – Australia won by 9 wickets
- [ 4th Test] at Antigua Recreation Ground, St John's – West Indies won by 3 wickets

=== Sri Lanka 2003 ===
- [ 1st Test] at Beausejour Stadium, Gros Islet – match drawn
- [ 2nd Test] at Sabina Park, Kingston – West Indies won by 7 wickets

=== England 2003-04 ===
- [ 1st Test] at Sabina Park, Kingston – England won by 10 wickets
- [ 2nd Test] at Queen's Park Oval, Port of Spain, Trinidad – England won by 7 wickets
- [ 3rd Test] at Kensington Oval, Bridgetown, Barbados – England won by 8 wickets
- [ 4th Test] at Antigua Recreation Ground, St John's – match drawn

=== Bangladesh 2004 ===
- [ 1st Test] at Beausejour Stadium, Gros Islet – match drawn
- [ 2nd Test] at Sabina Park, Kingston – West Indies won by an innings and 99 runs

=== South Africa 2004-05 ===
- [ 1st Test] at Bourda, Georgetown – match drawn
- [ 2nd Test] at Queen's Park Oval, Port of Spain, Trinidad – South Africa won by 8 wickets
- [ 3rd Test] at Kensington Oval, Bridgetown, Barbados – South Africa won by an innings and 86 runs
- [ 4th Test] at Antigua Recreation Ground, St John's – match drawn

=== Pakistan 2004-05 ===
- [ 1st Test] at Kensington Oval, Bridgetown, Barbados – West Indies won by 276 runs
- [ 2nd Test] at Sabina Park, Kingston – Pakistan won by 136 runs

=== India 2006 ===
- [ 1st Test] at Antigua Recreation Ground, St John's – match drawn
- [ 2nd Test] at Beausejour Stadium, Gros Islet – match drawn
- [ 3rd Test] at Warner Park, Basseterre – match drawn
- [ 4th Test] at Sabina Park, Kingston – India won by 49 runs

== External sources ==
- CricketArchive – itinerary of events
- Indian Cricket Official Partner
- List of calypso songs about cricket - 2000 to 2010
