= History of cricket in the West Indies from 1980–81 to 1990 =

This article describes the history of West Indies cricket from 1981 to 1990.

During this decade, the West Indies cricket team dominated Test cricket. Outstanding players of the time were the captain Viv Richards, opening batsmen Gordon Greenidge and Desmond Haynes, wicketkeeper-batsman Jeff Dujon and a battery of fast bowlers headed by Malcolm Marshall and including Joel Garner, Michael Holding, Curtly Ambrose and Courtney Walsh. The only "achilles heel" in this outstanding team was the lack of a quality spin bowler.

== Domestic cricket 1980–81 to 1990 ==
=== Shell Shield winners ===
- 1980–81 Combined Islands
- 1981–82 Barbados
- 1982–83 Guyana
- 1983–84 Barbados
- 1984–85 Trinidad and Tobago
- 1985–86 Barbados
- 1986–87 Guyana
- 1987–88 Jamaica
- 1988–89 Jamaica
- 1989–90 Leeward Islands

== International tours 1980–81 to 1990 ==
=== England 1980–81 ===
- [ 1st Test] at Queen's Park Oval, Port of Spain, Trinidad – West Indies won by an innings and 79 runs
- [ 2nd Test] at Bourda, Georgetown – game abandoned
- [ 3rd Test] at Kensington Oval, Bridgetown, Barbados – West Indies won by 298 runs
- [ 4th Test] at Antigua Recreation Ground, St John's – match drawn
- [ 5th Test] at Sabina Park, Kingston – match drawn

=== India 1982–83 ===
- [ 1st Test] at Sabina Park, Kingston – West Indies won by 4 wickets
- [ 2nd Test] at Queen's Park Oval, Port of Spain, Trinidad – match drawn
- [ 3rd Test] at Bourda, Georgetown – match drawn
- [ 4th Test] at Kensington Oval, Bridgetown, Barbados – West Indies won by 10 wickets
- [ 5th Test] at Antigua Recreation Ground, St John's – match drawn

=== Australia 1983–84 ===
- [ 1st Test] at Bourda, Georgetown – match drawn
- [ 2nd Test] at Queen's Park Oval, Port of Spain, Trinidad – match drawn
- [ 3rd Test] at Kensington Oval, Bridgetown, Barbados – West Indies won by 10 wickets
- [ 4th Test] at Antigua Recreation Ground, St John's – West Indies won by an innings and 36 runs
- [ 5th Test] at Sabina Park, Kingston – West Indies won by 10 wickets

=== New Zealand 1984–85 ===
- [ 1st Test] at Queen's Park Oval, Port of Spain, Trinidad – match drawn
- [ 2nd Test] at Bourda, Georgetown – match drawn
- [ 3rd Test] at Kensington Oval, Bridgetown, Barbados – West Indies won by 10 wickets
- [ 4th Test] at Sabina Park, Kingston – West Indies won by 10 wickets

=== England 1985–86 ===
- [ 1st Test] at Sabina Park, Kingston – West Indies won by 10 wickets
- [ 2nd Test] at Queen's Park Oval, Port of Spain, Trinidad – West Indies won by 7 wickets
- [ 3rd Test] at Kensington Oval, Bridgetown, Barbados – West Indies won by an innings and 30 runs
- [ 4th Test] at Queen's Park Oval, Port of Spain, Trinidad – West Indies won by 10 wickets
- [ 5th Test] at Antigua Recreation Ground, St John's – West Indies won by 240 runs

=== Pakistan 1987–88 ===
- [ 1st Test] at Bourda, Georgetown – Pakistan won by 9 wickets
- [ 2nd Test] at Queen's Park Oval, Port of Spain, Trinidad – match drawn
- [ 3rd Test] at Kensington Oval, Bridgetown, Barbados – West Indies won by 2 wickets

=== India 1988–89 ===
- [ 1st Test] at Bourda, Georgetown – match drawn
- [ 2nd Test] at Kensington Oval, Bridgetown, Barbados – West Indies won by 8 wickets
- [ 3rd Test] at Queen's Park Oval, Port of Spain, Trinidad – West Indies won by 217 runs
- [ 4th Test] at Sabina Park, Kingston – West Indies won by 7 wickets

=== England 1989–90 ===
- [ 1st Test] at Sabina Park, Kingston – England won by 9 wickets
- [ 2nd Test] at Bourda, Georgetown – game abandoned
- [ 3rd Test] at Queen's Park Oval, Port of Spain, Trinidad – match drawn
- [ 4th Test] at Kensington Oval, Bridgetown, Barbados – West Indies won by 164 runs
- [ 5th Test] at Antigua Recreation Ground, St John's – West Indies won by an innings and 32 runs

== External sources ==
- "The Home of CricketArchive". CricketArchive – itinerary of events
- List of calypso songs about cricket - 1980 to 1990
