= West Indies Championship =

Domestic cricket tournament

Regional Four Day Competition
- Countries: West Indies
- Administrator: Cricket West Indies (CWI)
- Format: First-class (4-day)
- First edition: 1965–66
- Latest edition: 2026
- Tournament format: Round robin, semi-finals
- Number of teams: 8
- Current champion: Trinidad and Tobago – 5 titles (plus 1 shared)
- Most successful: Barbados – 23 titles (plus 1 shared)
- Most runs: Devon Smith (Windward Islands) – 11,321
- Most wickets: Veerasammy Permaul (Guyana) – 526

The Regional Four Day Competition, formerly known as the Shell Shield, Red Stripe, Busta and Carib Beer Cup, is the West Indies's first-class cricket competition that's run by Cricket West Indies. In the 2013–2014 season the winner of the tournament was awarded the WICB President's Trophy while the winners of the knockout competition were awarded the George Headley/Everton Weekes trophy. In a few previous seasons the winners of the tournament were awarded the Headley/Weekes trophy. On from the 2016–17 season, the Competition was sponsored by Digicel and was known as the Digicel Four Day Championship. Since 2019–20, the competition has been renamed as the West Indies Championship.

The competition is contested between seven Caribbean teams and, on occasion, touring sides from other countries. Of these sides four of them, Barbados, Guyana, Jamaica and Trinidad and Tobago, come from solitary nations. While two other teams, the Leeward Islands and the Windward Islands, previously competed as the Combined Islands, now each being from a myriad of nations. Since the 2007–08 season a Combined Campuses and Colleges cricket team (CCC cricket team) were included in the competition. However, in July 2014 the WICB announced that the CCC cricket team was to be excluded from the upcoming 2014–15 Regional Four Day competition. This came as a series of changes adopted based on the recommendations made in a March 2014 report presented by Richard Pybus, WICB's then director of cricket.

The current structure of the tournament, since the 2014–15 season is a double round-robin league system with the team earning the most points being declared the winner. Prior to this the tournament didn't comprise a knock out stage so teams could potentially both win the tournament. The competition later consisted of a single round-robin league followed by semi-finals and a final. The current champions are Guyana. Barbados have won the most titles with twenty-two outright (and one shared), while Jamaica and Guyana have won the most consecutive titles (five).

== Competing teams ==
The following teams have competed in every tournament since the 1981–82 season:

- Barbados (now going by the franchise name Barbados Pride)
- Guyana (now going by the franchise name Guyana Harpy Eagles)
- Jamaica (now going by the franchise name Jamaica Scorpions)
- Leeward Islands (now going by the franchise name Leeward Islands Hurricanes)
- Trinidad and Tobago (now going by the franchise name Trinidad and Tobago Red Force)
- Windward Islands (now going by the franchise name Windward Islands Volcanoes)

The following teams have also made appearances in the competition:

- Combined Islands – 1965–66 to 1980–81
- England Lions – 2000–01 (as England A), 2010–11
- West Indies B – 2000–01, 2001–02, 2002–03, 2003–04
- Bangladesh A – 2001–02
- India A – 2002–03
- Kenya – 2003–04
- Combined Campuses and Colleges – 2007–08 to 2013–14 and from 2023 to present
- West Indies Academy – since 2023

== Origins ==
First-class cricket has been played in the West Indies since 1865, when Barbados beat Demerara, later known as British Guiana and now Guyana, at the Garrison Savannah in Bridgetown. During 1891 three teams, namely Barbados, British Guiana and Trinidad and Tobago, took part in the inaugural Inter-Colonial Tournament held at the Barbados' Bay Pasture, with Barbados eventually defeating British Guiana in the final by an innings and 55 runs. All three teams won the tournament on more than five occasions. When Jamaica attained first-class status, they only played 22 games in their first 30 years as a cricketing side, usually playing touring teams from England. After the West Indies were awarded Test status in 1928, the number of games played by Jamaica increased.

During World War II, there was no official Inter-Colonial tournament, but matches were still played between the three teams who had competed for it, and this continued after the war, but now also including Jamaica. In 1956, British Guiana hosted a four-team knock-out tournament, which was repeated five years later but now with the Combined Islands joining in. The final unofficial tournament (which does not appear on records in Wisden Cricketers' Almanack or Cricinfo) was held in 1964, with Barbados, British Guiana, Jamaica and Trinidad competing in a league, which British Guiana won.

== History of the competition ==
The regular competition began in the 1965–66 season, named the Shell Shield (after sponsors Royal Dutch Shell), and the five teams that had contested the 1961 knock-out competed in a round-robin league, with two home matches and two away matches for each team. This format and name remained until 1981–82, when the Combined Islands were split up into the Leeward and Windward Islands by the West Indies Cricket Board. This meant that the season was lengthened to five games per side. Barbados dominated from the outset, with nine titles won from 1965–66 to 1979–80. The Combined Islands won their first title in 1980–81 after four runners-up spots in the preceding six seasons – becoming the last of the five teams to win a title.

Barbados won three more titles before the tournament was modified in the 1986–87 season. Where instead of a round-robin league, there were now two round-robin groups, determined by geography. The league structure was though back into place for the next season. As well the contest was then and there renamed as the Red Stripe Cup with its main sponsor being the Jamaican beer Red Stripe. Leeward Islands won their first ever title in 1989–90, winning all five games in the league, but Barbados were back on top for the following season. No team managed to win back to back titles for the next fourteen seasons, though the Leeward Islands and Barbados exchanged the trophy between 1993–94 and 1998–99. The WICB tinkered with the competition's formats during this period of time. Where in 1995–96 a final match was played, while the 1996–97 season saw a home-and-away round-robin format of ten matches in total. At this seasons' close, Red Stripe withdrew as a sponsor. The regional tournament was eventually renamed the President's Cup and reduced to five matches a team once again. On from the 1998–99 season, Trinidadian soft drink Busta became the new title sponsor with the newly named Busta Cup, having a semi-final and a final appended after the round-robin stage.

Barbados and Jamaica went on to both dominate the 2000s. Barbados in 2004 became the first team to successfully defend a first class title since Jamaica in 1989. These said sides have respectively won fourteen out of the first fifteen first class titles of the 21st century. The 2000s saw teams from other nations take part, as in England A, Bangladesh A, India A and Kenya. Along with that two scholastic sides, West Indies B and the Combined Campuses and Colleges also featured in the competition. In 2002 Carib Brewery became the title sponsor. So the competition became known as the Carib Beer Cup for the next six years until Carib's sponsorship ended in 2008/09. The semi-finals were removed for the 2004–05 as was the West Indies B team with the tournament returning to a six-team league. This now consisted of ten home and away matches for each side with a final played between the top two teams. In the 2005–06 season, the league returned to one round-robin series where teams each play five games before the top two sides meet in the final.

Since 2009 it has been entitled as the Regional Four Day Competition with the winning side lofting the Headley-Weekes Trophy, named after both George Headley and Everton Weekes. Between 2008 and 2012, Jamaica won the competition for a record five times in a row. The only previous time a team had won the record five times in a row was between 1976 and 1980 when Barbados won the title; however, for that streak, the first title in 1976 was shared between Barbados and Trinidad & Tobago whereas for Jamaica's 2008–2012 streak the title was never shared with any other team.

In 2014, the WICB announced major structural changes to the first-class cricket competition starting with the exclusion of the Combined Campuses and Colleges team from the competition (in which it had participated since 2007–08). Additionally, it was announced that a franchise system was to be introduced for first-class cricket, similar to that of the Caribbean Premier League, with the six territorial teams being able to select players from all over the region and possibly from overseas. The new franchises would be owned by the territorial boards themselves and the teams would still retain their traditional territorial names. A draft system was also introduced, under which each of the territorial boards will be allowed to retain and contract 10 players, with the rest of the region's player pool going into a player draft for the teams to complete their 15-player squads. The regional four-day competition itself was extended to a double round-robin format and also became part of the WICB's new Professional Cricket League, which also included the NAGICO Super50. The newly extended Regional Four Day Competition will be played on a home and away basis over ten rounds from 14 November 2014 to 23 March 2015.

Since 2019–20, the competition has been renamed as the West Indies Championship.

== Structure ==
From the 2010–11 season until the start of the Professional Cricket League the teams have played each other once in a double round-robin format followed by semi-finals which are contested between the top four teams of the league stage.

Points were awarded as follows:

- Outright win – 12
- Loser if 1st Innings lead obtained – 4
- Loser if tie on 1st Innings – 3
- Loser if 1st Innings also lost – 0
- Tie – 8

Incomplete Match

- 1st Innings lead – 6
- 1st Innings loss – 3
- Tie on 1st innings – 4

Score Equal in a Drawn Match

- Team batting on the 4th innings – 8
- Team fielding on the 4th innings if that team has lead on 1st inning – 6
- If scores tied on 1st innings – 4
- If team has lost on 1st innings – 3

Abandoned Match

In the event of a match being abandoned without any play having taken place, or in the event of there being no 1st innings decision, three points each.

=== Professional Cricket League era ===
Since the 2014–15 season when Professional Cricket League started the teams have played each other twice in a round-robin with the team having the most points at the end of the League being awarded the Championship and the Headley/Weekes Trophy.

Points are now awarded similarly to the 2010/11-2014/15 era except that now the concept for points for first innings lead has been abandoned and replaced with bonus points for batting (1 point being awarded in intervals of 50 runs for total scores over 200 for the first 110 overs and up to a maximum of 5 points), bowling (1 point being awarded in intervals of 2 wickets for 3 wickets or more taken in a team's innings for the first 110 overs and up to a maximum of 3 points) and for pace bowling (0.2 points for each wicket taken by designated pace bowlers). Tied matches are now awarded 6 points instead of 8 points and the range of points awarded for drawn matches has been replaced by each team getting 3 points plus the bonus points. For abandoned matches, the points awarded to each team has been reduced from 3 to 1, except where a match is abandoned due to a dangerous pitch, in which case the visiting team are awarded 12 points (as would happen with an outright win).

=== West Indies Championship ===
The previous edition of the tournament was known as the Regional Four Day Competition before being rebranded by CWI. Since 2019–20, the competition has been renamed as the West Indies Championship.

== Winners ==
Season	Team
1965–66	Barbados
1966–67	Barbados
1967–68	No competition
1968–69	Jamaica
1969–70	Trinidad and Tobago
1970–71	Trinidad and Tobago
1971–72	Barbados
1972–73	Guyana
1973–74	Barbados
1974–75	Guyana
1975–76	Trinidad and Tobago shared with Barbados
1976–77	Barbados
1977–78	Barbados
1978–79	Barbados
1979–80	Barbados
1980–81	Combined Islands
1981–82	Barbados
1982–83	Guyana
1983–84	Barbados
1984–85	Trinidad and Tobago
1985–86	Barbados
1986–87	Guyana
1987–88	Jamaica
1988–89	Jamaica
1989–90	Leeward Islands
1990–91	Barbados
1991–92	Jamaica
1992–93	Guyana
1993–94	Leeward Islands
1994–95	Barbados
1995–96	Leeward Islands
1996–97	Barbados
1997–98	Leeward Islands shared with Guyana
1998–99	Barbados
1999–2000	Jamaica
2000–01	Barbados
2001–02	Jamaica
2002–03	Barbados
2003–04	Barbados
2004–05	Jamaica
2005–06	Trinidad and Tobago
2006–07	Barbados
2007–08	Jamaica
2008–09	Jamaica
2009–10	Jamaica
2010–11	Jamaica
2011–12	Jamaica
2012–13	Barbados
2013–14	Barbados
2014–15	Guyana
2015–16	Guyana
2016–17	Guyana
2017–18	Guyana
2018–19	Guyana
2019–20	Barbados
2021–22	Barbados
2022–23	Guyana
2023–24	Guyana
2024–25	Guyana
2026	Trinidad and Tobago

The above winners are of the league phase, since 2000/01 there has been a knock-out tournament (the Busta International Shield in 2000/01; the Busta International Shield/International Trophy in 2001/02; the Carib Beer International Trophy from 2002/03 to 2004/05; the Carib Beer International Challenge from 2005/06 to 2006/07 and the Carib Beer Challenge in 2007/08) with qualification based on league position. In 2000/01 four teams progressed to the knockout phase with Jamaica beating the league winner, Barbados in the first semi-final before going on to win the final against Guyana by first innings points in a drawn match. This form was reversed in the 2001/02 knockout competition when Guyana beat Jamaica in the final on first innings points in a drawn match. For the next three seasons (2002/03, 2003/04 and 2004/05) the league winners were also the winners of the knockout competitions, with Barbados beating Jamaica in the final by 7 wickets in 2002/03; Barbados beating Jamaica again in 2003/04 (by 84 runs) and Jamaica beating the Leeward Islands by 8 wickets in 2004/05. In 2004/05 however, only the top two teams from the league stage progressed to the knock-out competition. In 2005/06 four teams again progressed to the knock-out phase, where initial league winners Trinidad and Tobago won the final against Barbados. In 2006/07 only the top two teams qualified, Barbados (as league champions) and Trinidad and Tobago (as league runners-up). The league form was reversed as Trinidad and Tobago defended their title with a 49 run win. Trinidad and Tobago reached their third successive final in 2007/08, this time losing to Jamaica. In 2008/09 the knock-out Carib Beer Challenge was discontinued. In 2013/14 a knock-out tournament was reintroduced, with the top four teams from the league competition qualifying. Barbados' league form was reversed as Jamaica won the knock-out competition (and the Headley/Weekes trophy) against the Windward Islands in the final.

== Number of wins by team (since 1965–66) ==
Team	Wins
Barbados	23 (plus 1 shared)
Guyana	13 (plus 1 shared)
Jamaica	12
Trinidad and Tobago	5 (plus 1 shared)
Leeward Islands	3 (plus 1 shared)
Combined Islands	1

== Most successful captains ==
Captain	Wins
Leon Johnson	6 (2015, 2016, 2017, 2018, 2019, 2023)
Tamar Lambert	6 (2005, 2008, 2009, 2010, 2011, 2012)
David Holford	5 (1972, 1974, 1976, 1977, 1979)
Kraigg Brathwaite	3 (2014, 2020, 2022)
Courtney Browne	3 (1995, 2003, 2004)
Joey Carew	2 (1970, 1971)
Roger Harper	2 (1987, 1993)
Carl Hooper	2 (1998, 2002)
Clive Lloyd	2 (1975, 1983)
Viv Richards	2 (1981, 1990)
Garfield Sobers	2 (1966, 1967)
Marlon Tucker	2 (1988, 1989)
