= Windward Islands cricket team =

Multinational cricket team

Windward Islands

Personnel
- Captain: Sunil Ambris & Kavem Hodge
- Coach: Andrew Richardson

Team information
- Colours: Green
- Founded: 1980
- Home ground: (Saint Vincent and the Grenadines) Arnos Vale Stadium; National Cricket Stadium (Grenada); Windsor Park (Dominica); (Saint Lucia) Darren Sammy Cricket Stadium

History
- Four Day wins: 0
- Super50 Cup wins: 4
- Twenty20 wins: 0
- Official website: Windward Island Cricket Board

The Windward Islands cricket team is a cricket team representing the member countries of the Windward Islands Cricket Board of Control. The team plays in the West Indies Professional Cricket League (including the NAGICO Regional Super50) under the franchise name Windward Islands Volcanoes.

It includes the islands that were known as the British Windward Islands except for Barbados and Trinidad and Tobago, who have their own teams. Thus, it includes Dominica (technically one of the Leeward Islands, but as it was part of the Windward Islands colony from 1940 until independence, its cricket federation remains a part of the Windward Islands), Grenada, Saint Lucia and Saint Vincent and the Grenadines.

The team plays in inter-regional cricket competitions in the Caribbean, such as the Regional Four Day Competition and the Regional Super50, and the best players may be selected for the West Indies cricket team, which plays international cricket. However, Grenada took part in the 1998 Commonwealth Games cricket competition separately. The Windwards have won a sum of four regional one day titles. With prominent cricketers who've played for the Windward Islands including Sunil Ambris, Cameron Cuffy, Casper Davis, Winston Davis, Delorn Johnson, Obed McCoy, Nixon McLean, Junior Murray, Darren Sammy, Shane Shillingford, Devon Smith, Wilf Slack and Kesrick Williams.

== Team history ==
The Windward Islands team is the least successful of the six West Indian first class teams, having failed to win a first-class title and with four one-day titles in 37 attempts. They played their first first-class match in 1959–60 against the touring England side, losing by ten wickets, and until 1980–81 they mainly played as a part of the Combined Islands. However, from 1981–82 onwards they have played as a separate entity.

On a few occasions, all in the one-day Red Stripe Bowl competition, two teams have represented the Windwards. In the 2001–02, Northern Windward Islands and Southern Windward Islands competed, while in 2002–03, a team from Saint Vincent and Grenadines and a Rest of the Windward Islands side took part.

== Squad ==
Name	Birth date	Batting style	Bowling style	Notes
Batsmen
Devon Smith	21 October 1981 (age 44)	Left-handed	Right-arm off spin	
Desron Maloney	5 May 1991 (age 34)	Right-handed	-	
Kirk Edwards	3 November 1984 (age 41)	Left-handed	Right-arm off spin	List A Captain
Johann Jeremiah	12 February 1999 (age 27)	Right-handed	Right-arm off spin	
All-rounders
Kavem Hodge	21 February 1993 (age 33)	Right-handed	Left-arm orthodox	
Keron Cottoy	14 November 1989 (age 36)	Left-handed	Right-arm leg spin	
Alick Athanaze	7 December 1998 (age 27)	Left-handed	Right-arm off spin	
Bhaskar Yadram	18 September 1999 (age 26)	Left-handed	Right-arm medium	
Ryan John	25 September 1997 (age 28)	Right-handed	Right-arm medium-fast	
Wicket-keepers
Emmanuel Stewart	23 August 1999 (age 26)	Right-handed	-	
Andre Fletcher	28 November 1987 (age 38)	Right-handed	-	
Sunil Ambris	23 March 1993 (age 32)	Right-handed	-	First-class Captain
Spin bowlers
Shane Shillingford	22 February 1983 (age 43)	Right-handed	Right-arm off spin	
Larry Edwards	16 February 1995 (age 31)	Left-handed	Left-arm orthodox	
Kenneth Dember			Right-arm off spin	
Pace bowlers
Shermon Lewis	21 October 1995 (age 30)	Right-handed	Right-arm fast	
Preston McSween	15 August 1995 (age 30)	Right-handed	Left-arm medium-fast	
Josh Thomas			Right-arm medium	
Ray Jordan	21 October 1994 (age 31)	Right-handed	Right-arm fast-medium	

== Notable players ==
Prominent cricketers who have represented the Windward Islands include:

- (Saint Vincent and the Grenadines) Mike Findlay
- (Saint Vincent and the Grenadines) Winston Davis
- (Saint Vincent and the Grenadines) Nixon McLean
- (Saint Vincent and the Grenadines) Cameron Cuffy
- (Saint Vincent and the Grenadines) Deighton Butler
- (Saint Vincent and the Grenadines) Sunil Ambris
- (Saint Vincent and the Grenadines) Kesrick Williams
- (Saint Vincent and the Grenadines) Obed McCoy
- (Grenada) Rawl Lewis
- (Grenada) Junior Murray
- (Grenada) Devon Smith
- (Grenada) Andre Fletcher
- (Saint Lucia) Daren Sammy
- (Saint Lucia) Johnson Charles
- (Dominica) Lockhart Sebastien
- (Dominica) Irvine Shillingford
- (Dominica) Shane Shillingford
- (Dominica) Adam Sanford

== Honours ==
- Domestic one-day competition (4): 1988–89, 2000–01, 2012–13, 2017-18

== Grounds ==
The Windward Islands team has played at the following venues

- Arnos Vale Stadium in Kingstown, Saint Vincent
- National Cricket Stadium in Grenada
- Daren Sammy Cricket Ground in Gros Islet, Saint Lucia.
- Windsor Park in Roseau, Dominica
- Mindoo Philip Park in Castries, Saint Lucia
- Tanteen Recreation Ground in Grenada

The Mindoo Philip Park has not seen any first-class cricket since 2001, and has been replaced by the Daren Sammy Cricket Ground in Gros Islet.

== See also ==
- List of international cricketers from the Windward Islands
- List of Windward Islands first-class cricketers
- Dominica national cricket team
- Grenada national cricket team
- Saint Vincent and the Grenadines national cricket team
- Saint Lucia national cricket team
