= Leeward Islands cricket team =

Multinational cricket team

Leeward Islands
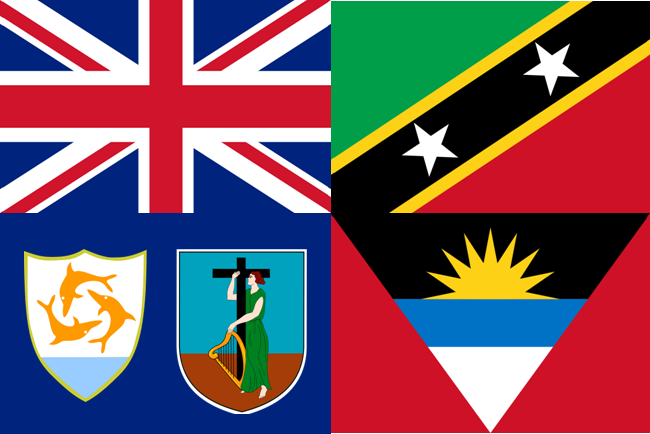

Personnel
- Captain: (Antigua and Barbuda) Rakheem Cornwall (First-class) (Anguilla) Jahmar Hamilton (List A)
- Coach: (Antigua and Barbuda) Stuart Williams

Team information
- Colours: Maroon Gold
- Founded: 1980
- Home ground: (Antigua and Barbuda) Sir Vivian Richards Stadium (Saint Kitts and Nevis) Warner Park (Saint Kitts and Nevis) Edgar Gilbert Ground (Nevis) Elquemedo Willett Park (Montserrat) Salem Oval (Sint Maarten) Carib Lumber Ball Park (United States Virgin Islands) Addelita Cancryn

History
- Four Day wins: 3 (plus 1 shared)
- Super50 Cup wins: 5 (plus 2 shared)
- Twenty20 wins: 0
- Official website: Leeward Islands

The Leeward Islands cricket team is a first-class cricket team representing the member countries of the Leeward Islands Cricket Association, an associate of the West Indies Cricket Board. Antigua and Barbuda, Saint Kitts, Nevis, Anguilla, Montserrat, British Virgin Islands, US Virgin Islands and Sint Maarten are members of the Leeward Islands Cricket Association. The team does not participate in any international competitions (though Antigua and Barbuda took part at the 1998 Commonwealth Games), but rather in inter-regional competitions in the Caribbean, such as the Regional Four Day Competition and the Regional Super50. The team competes in regional cricket under the franchise name Leeward Islands Hurricanes.

The Leeward Islands has won a total of ten domestic titles – four in first class cricket and six in one-day cricket, but their last title was in 1997–98 when they won the double (although the first-class title was shared with Guyana). The list of prominent cricketers who have played for the Leewards Islands includes Curtly Ambrose, Eldine Baptiste, Kenny Benjamin, Winston Benjamin, Sheldon Cottrell, George Ferris, Ridley Jacobs, Viv Richards, Richie Richardson, Andy Roberts, Hayden Walsh Jr. and Alzarri Joseph

== History ==
The Leeward Islands played their inaugural first-class game in 1958, and lost by an innings and 19 runs to Jamaica. Their first win did not come until 1968–69, when they beat Guyana by 43 runs at the Warner Park Sporting Complex ground. From 1965–66 to 1980–81 the team competed as the Combined Islands in first-class cricket, along with the best cricketers from the Windward Islands. However, when regular one-day competitions began in 1975–76 the island groups were separate, and the Leeward Islands won on their third outing in 1977–78.

In 1981–82 the Leeward Islands made their debut in the Shell Shield with a 57-run win over the Windward Islands (the season after the Combined Islands had won the title), but it was to take eight seasons until they could lift the first-class trophy – which by then had been renamed the Red Stripe Cup. From 1989–90 to 1997–98, the Leeward Islands won three outright first-class titles with one shared and three outright one-day titles with one shared. Since then their only major trophy has been their 2010–11 WICB Cup triumph.

== Squad ==
Name	Birth date	Batting style	Bowling style	Notes
Batters
Kieran Powell	6 March 1990 (age 36)	Left-handed	Right-arm off spin	
Montcin Hodge	29 September 1987 (age 39)	Left-handed	Left-arm orthodox	
Amir Jangoo	14 July 1997 (age 29)	Left-handed	-	
Devon Thomas	12 November 1989 (age 37)	Right-handed	Right-arm medium	
Keacy Carty	19 March 1997 (age 29)	Right-handed	Right-arm medium	
Akeem Saunders	17 June 1994 (age 32)	Right-handed	-	
All-rounders
Terrence Warde	2 January 1989 (age 37)	Right-handed	-	
Rahkeem Cornwall	1 February 1993 (age 33)	Right-handed	Right-arm off spin	(First-class captain)
Colin Archibald	20 October 1996 (age 30)	Left-handed	Left-arm fast-medium	
Hayden Walsh Jr.	23 April 1992 (age 34)	Left-handed	Right-arm leg spin	
Wicket-keepers
Jahmar Hamilton	22 September 1990 (age 36)	Right-handed	-	(List A captain)
Jaison Peters	22 November 1989 (age 36)	Right-handed	-	
Spin bowlers
Jason Campbell	30 November 1985 (age 40)	Left-handed	Left-arm orthodox	
Damion Jacobs	15 February 1985 (age 41)	Right-handed	Right-arm leg spin	
Pace bowlers
Sheeno Berridge	27 September 1990 (age 36)	Right-handed	Right-arm medium	
Quinton Boatswain	16 October 1990 (age 36)	Right-handed	Right-arm fast-medium	
Jeremiah Louis	12 March 1996 (age 30)	Right-handed	Right-arm medium-fast	
Sheldon Cottrell	19 August 1989 (age 37)	Right-handed	Left-arm fast-medium	

== Notable players ==
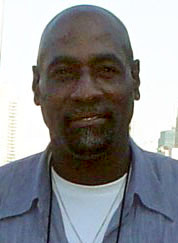
Antiguan born Viv Richards

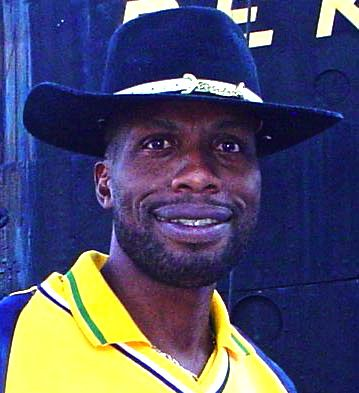
Curtly Ambrose took 405 Test wickets

The list of prominent cricketers who have represented the Leeward Islands includes:

- (Antigua and Barbuda) Curtly Ambrose
- (Antigua and Barbuda) Kenny Benjamin
- (Antigua and Barbuda) Winston Benjamin
- (Antigua and Barbuda) Ridley Jacobs
- (Antigua and Barbuda) Viv Richards
- (Antigua and Barbuda) Richie Richardson
- (Antigua and Barbuda) Andy Roberts
- (Antigua and Barbuda) Eldine Baptiste
- (Antigua and Barbuda) Sylvester Joseph
- (Jamaica) Sheldon Cotterell
- (Nevis) Keith Arthurton
- (Nevis) Derick Parry
- (Nevis) Stuart Williams
- (Nevis) Runako Morton
- (Nevis) Kieran Powell
- (Anguilla) Omari Banks
- (Montserrat) Lionel Baker
- (Dominica) Adam Sanford

== Grounds ==
The Leeward Islands play cricket on all their territories, though the only grounds to have seen Test cricket are the Sir Vivian Richards Stadium, Warner Park in St Kitts and the now disused Antigua Recreation Ground. The Leeward Islands have also played home games at Salem Oval (Montserrat), Edgar Gilbert Sporting Complex (Saint Kitts), Carib Lumber Ball Park (Sint Maarten), Addelita Cancryn Junior High School Ground (St. Thomas) and Elquemedo Willet Park (Nevis).

== Honours ==
- Regional Four Day Competition (4): 1989–90, 1993–94, 1995–96, 1997–98 (shared)
- Domestic one-day competition (7): 1977–78 (shared), 1981–82, 1992–93 (shared), 1993–94, 1994–95, 1997–98, 2010–11
