= Jamaica national cricket team =

Sports team

Jamaica

Personnel
- Captain: Paul Palmer (First class) & Rovman Powell (List A)
- Coach: Andrew Richardson

Team information
- Colours: Green Black Gold Gold, Green, Black
- Founded: 1888
- Home ground: Sabina Park, Kingston
- Capacity: 22,000

History
- First-class debut: RS Lucas' XI in 1895 at Sabina Park, Kingston
- Four Day wins: 12
- Super50 Cup wins: 8 (plus 1 shared)
- CT20 wins: 0

The Jamaica national cricket team is the representative cricket team of Jamaica. The team competes under the franchise name, Jamaica Scorpions in the Cricket West Indies' Professional Cricket League which comprises both the Regional Four Day Competition and the Regional Super50. Jamaica has won a sum of 12 regional first class and 9 regional one day titles. Hence the Scorpions have won the second most first class and 50 over championships in the history of West Indies cricket.

The most prominent Jamaican cricketers include George Headley, Allan Rae, Alf Valentine, Collie Smith, Lawrence Rowe, Michael Holding, Jeff Dujon, Courtney Walsh, Patrick Patterson, Jimmy Adams, Chris Gayle, Marlon Samuels, Jerome Taylor, Nikita Miller and Gareth Breese.

== History ==
The team's history dates back to 1895, when they played three matches against a touring side from England led by Slade Lucas, but because of the distance to the other cricketing countries, Jamaica did not play regular first-class cricket until 1964. They played in the inaugural Shell Shield first-class competition, winning it on the fourth attempt, but then had to wait until 1977–78 for their next title – which was a shared one-day title with Leeward Islands.

From 1986 to 1992, Jamaica won a total of six titles (three first class and three one-day), but in the thirteen seasons since then they have added four to the cupboard, despite completing the double in 1999–2000. In 2004–05, they came back after a two-year drought, however – with seven wins in ten regular season matches, they were 47 points ahead of runners-up Leeward Islands on the regular season table to win the Carib Beer Cup, before defeating the Leeward Islands by eight wickets in the final to take the Carib Beer Challenge title as well. However, this was followed up by a last-place finish the following season.

The team does not take part in any international competitions (the 1998 Commonwealth Games tournament being an exception), but rather in inter-regional competitions in the Caribbean, such as the Regional Four Day Competition and the Regional Super50, and the best players may be selected for the West Indies cricket team, which plays international cricket. Jamaica has won the domestic first class competition 12 times in total. They have also won the one-day competition eight times outright, sharing the title on one occasion. The team competes in the Professional Cricket Leagues under the franchise name Jamaica Scorpions.

== Squad ==
Name	Birth date	Batting style	Bowling style	Notes
Batsmen
Jermaine Blackwood	20 November 1991 (age 34)	Right-handed	Right-arm off spin	
Nkruma Bonner	23 January 1989 (age 37)	Right-handed	Right-arm leg spin	
Assad Fudadin	1 August 1985 (age 40)	Left-handed	Right-arm medium-fast	
Paul Palmer	5 January 1992 (age 34)	Left-handed		First-class Captain
Brandon King	16 December 1994 (age 31)	Right-handed		
All-rounders
John Campbell	21 September 1993 (age 32)	Left-handed	Right-arm off spin	
Rovman Powell	23 July 1993 (age 32)	Right-handed	Right-arm medium-fast	List A Captain
Marquino Mindley	29 December 1994 (age 31)	Right-handed	Right-arm fast-medium	
Andre McCarthy	8 June 1987 (age 38)	Right-handed	Right-arm off spin	
Alwyn Williams				
Fabian Allen	7 May 1995 (age 30)	Right-handed	Left-arm orthodox	
Wicket-keepers
Denis Smith	30 October 1991 (age 34)	Right-handed		
Aldane Thomas	9 December 1994 (age 31)	Right-handed		
Oraine Williams	13 July 1992 (age 33)	Right-handed		
Spin Bowlers
Jamie Merchant	13 July 1989 (age 36)	Right-handed	Right-arm off spin	
Patrick Harty	29 January 1991 (age 35)	Left-handed	Left-arm orthodox	
Dennis Bulli	26 March 1987 (age 39)	Right-handed	Left-arm orthodox	Played for West Indies Emerging team in Super50
Christopher Lamont	6 January 1988 (age 38)	Left-handed	Left-arm orthodox	
Pace Bowlers
Derval Green	4 December 1988 (age 37)	Right-handed	Right-arm medium-fast	
Nicholson Gordon	14 October 1993 (age 32)	Right-handed	Left-arm fast-medium	
Oshane Thomas	18 February 1997 (age 29)	Left-handed	Right-arm medium fast	

== Grounds ==
Jamaica's main ground is at Sabina Park in Kingston, which has hosted 144 first-class games since 1895. Regional and international games have also been played at the Trelawny Stadium in Trelawny.

== Honours ==
- Regional Four Day Competition (12): 1968–69, 1987–88, 1988–89, 1991–92, 1999–2000, 2001–02, 2004–05, 2007–08, 2008–09, 2009–10, 2010–11, 2011–12
- Domestic one-day competition (9): 1977–78 (shared), 1983–84, 1985–86, 1986–87, 1990–91, 1999–2000, 2007–08, 2011-12, 2022-23

== Tournament history ==
=== Commonwealth Games ===
Commonwealth Games record
Year	Round	Position	GP	W	L	T	NR
(Malaysia) 1998	Group stage	10/16	3	1	2	0	0
Total	0 Title	1/1	3	1	2	0	0

== See also ==
- List of international cricketers from Jamaica
- List of Jamaican representative cricketers
- Jamaican women's cricket team
- Jamaican Sportsperson of the Year
