= Haiti (disambiguation) =

Haiti is a Caribbean country roughly three-eighths of the island of Hispaniola and includes many small islands.

Haiti may also refer to:

- "Haiti", a song by Arcade Fire from the 2004 album Funeral
- Haiti, a play by American playwright William DuBois
- "Haiti I Am Sorry", or simply "Haiti", a 1988 calypso song by David Rudder
- Little Haiti, also known as La Petite Haïti, a center for Haitian immigrants in Florida
- SS Haiti (1932), a passenger and freight ship
- Team Haiti, a former American Basketball Association team

== See also ==
- Hati (disambiguation)
- Hiati, a village in Iran
- Empire of Haiti (disambiguation)
- Republic of Haiti (disambiguation)
- Hai Ti!, a Namibian educational comic strip
- Haitia, a small genus of two species in the Loosestrife family of plants that is named for Haiti
- Haitian (disambiguation)
- Hayti (disambiguation)
