= Ricky Skerritt =

Saint Kitts and Nevis politician and cricket administrator

Minister of Tourism and International Transports, Saint Kitts and Nevis
- In office 2010–2013

Minister of Tourism, International Transport, International Trade, Industry, Commerce, and Consumer Affairs, Saint Kitts and Nevis
- In office 2013–2015

President of Cricket West Indies
- In office 24 March 2019 – Incumbent
- Preceded by: Dave Cameron

Personal details
- Born: 7 June 1956 (age 70) Saint Kitts and Nevis
- Party: St. Kitts and Nevis Labour Party
- Education: Oxford University; University of the Virgin Islands

Richard 'Ricky' Skerritt (born 7 June 1956) is a Saint Kitts and Nevis politician affiliated to the St Kitts and Nevis Labour Party. He held several portfolios in the country's ministry from 2004 to 2015. He has also been closely associated with cricket in the Caribbean and has acted as the manager of West Indies cricket team.

In March 2019, he was elected as the president of Cricket West Indies, along with his running mate, Dr. Kishore Shallow as vice president when they defeated the incumbents president Dave Cameron and vice president Emmanuel Nanthan by margins of 8–4 in a secret ballot.

== Personal life ==
Skerritt was born on 7 June 1956 in Saint Kitts. He has a bachelor's degree from the University of the Virgin Islands and a master's degree from Oxford University.

In 2023, Skerritt was awarded an Honorary Doctor of Social Science degree from the University of Bolton in the United Kingdom for his contribution to the tourism sector.
