= Safiya George =

U.S. Virgin Islands nurse practitioner and academic administrator

President of the University of the Virgin Islands
- Incumbent
- Assumed office August 1, 2024
- Preceded by: David Hall

Personal details
- Born: St. Croix, U.S. Virgin Islands
- Education: University of the Virgin Islands (AS, BS); Emory University (MS, PhD)

Safiya George (formerly Dalmida) is a U.S. Virgin Islands nurse practitioner and academic administrator specialized in holistic health, spirituality, and HIV. She is the president of the University of the Virgin Islands. George served as the dean of the Christine E. Lynn College of Nursing at Florida Atlantic University from 2019 to 2024.

== Life ==
George earned an A.S. (1997) and B.S. (1999) in nursing from the University of the Virgin Islands. She completed a M.S. (2001) in nursing with a concentration in HIV/AIDS and oncology, a Ph.D. (2006) in nursing research, and a certificate (2006) in women's studies from Emory University. Her dissertation was titled, Relationships Among Spirituality, Depression, Immune Status, and Health-related Quality of Life in Women with HIV. Marcia McDonnell Holstad was her doctoral advisor. George conducted a postdoctoral fellowship in religion and health at the Duke University in 2007.

George is a nurse practitioner specialized in the areas of holistic health, spirituality, and HIV. From 2008 to 2015, she was an assistant professor at Emory University. In August 2015, she joined the University of Alabama as an associate professor and an assistant dean for research and director of scholarly affairs at the Capstone College of Nursing. George was inducted as a fellow of the American Association of Nurse Practitioners in 2018. On July 8, 2018, she became the Holli Rockwell Trubinsky Eminent dean and professor of the Christine E. Lynn College of Nursing at Florida Atlantic University. She was also the Chief Executive of Florida Atlantic Universities Louis and Anne Green Memory and Wellness center. In 2020, she was inducted as a distinguished fellow of the National Academies of Practice and as a fellow of the American Academy of Nursing in 2022. In February 2023, she joined the board of directors of the nonprofit, Boca Helping Hands. In February 2024, she was named as sixth president of the University of the Virgin Islands. She succeeded David Hall on August 1, 2024.
