= Republic of Haiti (disambiguation) =

The Republic of Haiti is a Caribbean country.

The Republic of Haiti may also refer to:

- Republic of Haiti (1806–1820)
- Republic of Haiti (1820–1849)
- Republic of Haiti (1859–1957)

== See also ==
- Haiti (disambiguation)
- Empire of Haiti (disambiguation)
