= University of the Virgin Islands =

Public university in the United States Virgin Islands

- University of the Virgin Islands seal
- Former name: College of the Virgin Islands (1962–1986)
- Motto: Historically American. Uniquely Caribbean. Globally Interactive.
- Type: Public historically black land-grant university
- Established: March 16, 1962; 64 years ago
- Endowment: $66.9 million (2020)
- President: Safiya George
- Provost: Camille McKayle
- Faculty: 107
- Administrative staff: 450
- Students: 2,138
- Location: St. Croix; 17.7176°N 64.7975°W; St. Thomas; 18.3435°N 64.9725°W; St. John; 18.3276696°N 64.7930529°W
- Colors: Reflex Blue & White
- Nicknames: Buccaneers and Lady Buccaneers
- Sporting affiliations: NAIA – HBCUAC
- Website: uvi.edu

The University of the Virgin Islands (or UVI) is a public historically black land-grant university in the U.S. territory of the United States Virgin Islands.

== History ==
UVI was founded as the College of the Virgin Islands on March 16, 1962. In 1986, it officially became one of the historically black colleges and universities. The institution also changed its name in 1986 to the University of the Virgin Islands to reflect the growth and diversification of its academic curriculum, research programs, and regional community services. On August 18, 2010, the United States Court of Appeals for the Third Circuit decided that the university's regulations prohibiting signs and conduct that could cause emotional distress were unconstitutional. On January 5, 2021, Governor Albert Bryan signed into law Act 8404, which honors former UVI President Orville Edward Kean for his contributions to the University of the Virgin Islands and renamed the St. Thomas campus after him.

=== Presidents ===
- Lawrence C. Wanlass 1962–1980
- Arthur A. Richards 1980–1990
- Orville Edward Kean 1990–2002
- LaVerne E. Ragster 2002–2009
- David Hall 2009–2024
- Safiya George 2024-

== Campuses ==

The university has two campuses and two extension facilities. The 388-acre (1.57 km^{2}) campus opened in 1963 on St. Thomas, at the time named College of the Virgin Islands. The Albert A. Sheen campus is on St. Croix. The extensions include an academic center and an environmental research facility, both on St. John. The St. Croix campus is located on Estate Golden Grove in mid-island. The St. Thomas campus is three miles (5 km) from Charlotte Amalie, the capital of the territory. The St. Thomas campus is situated on two hills and it has its own beach (John Brewer's Bay beach) which can be directly accessed off the main road which cuts through the campus. The majority of the buildings on the St. Thomas campus are made of volcanic rock and cement. This makes the campus not only aesthetically pleasing but it also improves the structural integrity of the structures as the U.S. Virgin Islands are known for experiencing very active hurricane seasons.

=== Athletic facilities ===
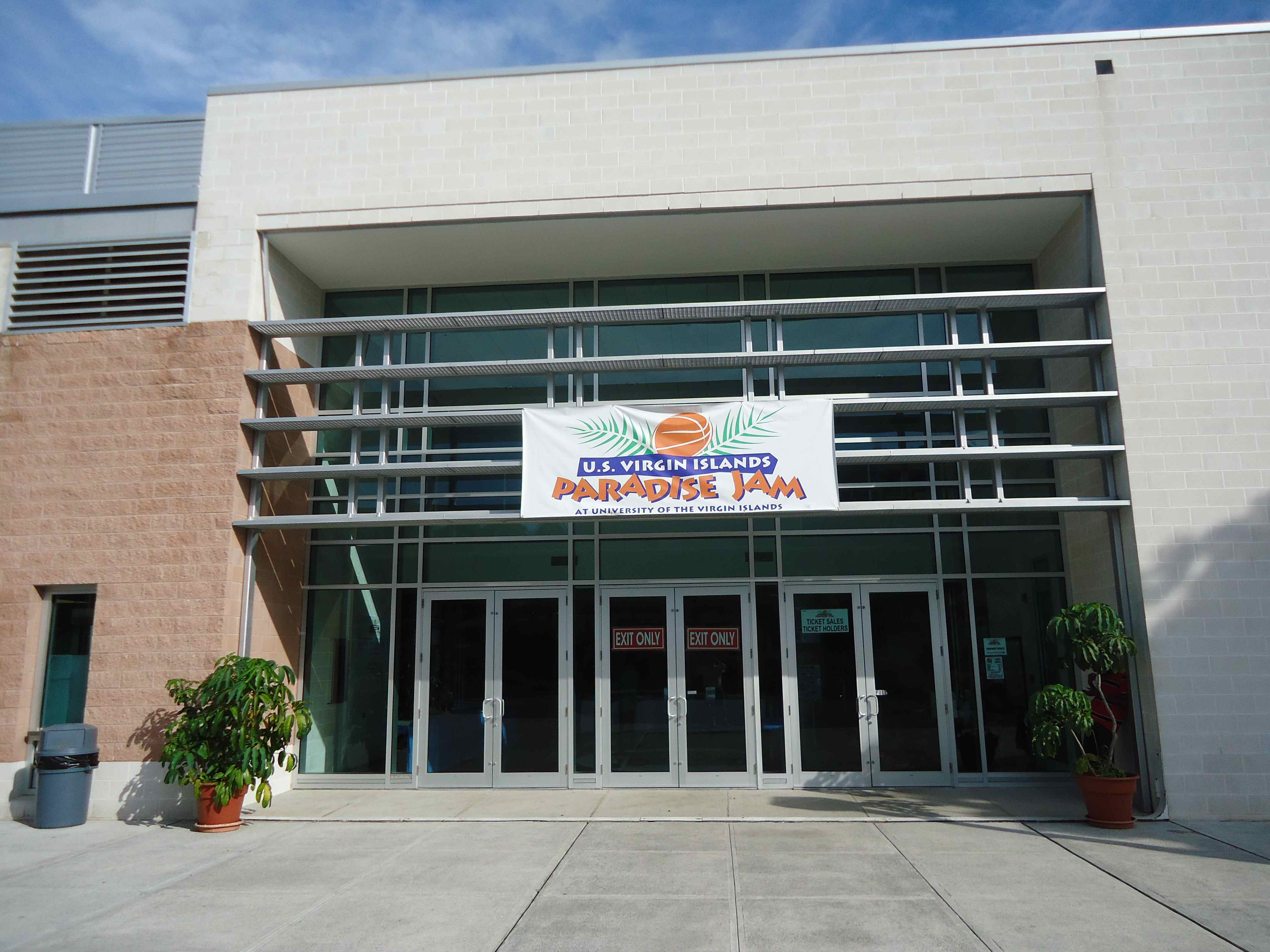
Sports and Fitness Center

The campus on St. Thomas boasts the 64,000-square-foot (5,900 m^{2}) Sports and Fitness Center with an adjacent weightlifting and aerobic exercise gym, as well as a golf course, tennis courts, outdoor basketball and volleyball courts, and baseball and soccer fields. The Sports and Fitness Center can seat up to 3,500 people and annually hosts the Paradise Jam tournament for mainland NCAA basketball teams.

On St. Croix, there is an outdoor sports facility equipped with basketball, volleyball, and tennis courts. Also, there is a small exercise gym inside the Student Activities center. St. Croix has large fields in front, and they are usually acceptable for athletic use, but they tend to flood during heavy rain.

=== Housing ===
In 2012 the university added a 37,000 square foot residential hall. The university has six different sets of dorms on the St. Thomas campus which include: Eastern Dorms, Western Dorms, Northern Dorms, Southern Dorms, and Middle Dorms. The Eastern and Western Dorms are both unisex dorms whereas the South and Middle are all-female dorms. The Northern Dorms are all male dorms.

Albert A. Sheen Campus on St. Croix has two residence halls, which together are known as the Delta M. Jackson Dorsch Complex. Its doors opened to students in 1999. Housing consists of 45 rooms with two beds per room, allowing accommodation for 90 students. The halls are sectioned into blocks: Knight's Block, Pirate's Block, Spartan's Block, and Titan's Block. Each block is designated by gender.

=== St. John Academic Center ===
St. John, the northernmost island of the US Virgin Islands currently has no college campus on the island. Residents of St. John wishing to attend the UVI are required to travel by ferry to the island of St. Thomas to attend classes. The journey can take a few minutes each way. UVI President, David Hall, made it a priority to provide easier access to students living in St. John.

After speaking with residents of St. John, Dr. Hall (President) discovered many obstacles hindering student education, including lack of access to a library and study spaces. Through the HBCU Library Alliance, funds were raised for the construction of a learning center in St. John. UVI chief information officer, Tina Koopmans, and library and IT staff developed a plan and located the resource center in an old gymnasium in St. John's MarketPlace.

The St. John Academic Center (STJAC) contains four classrooms, a library, and a computer lab. Additionally, students can attend class via video conferencing technology so that they do not need to travel off the island as frequently. There are also individual and group study spaces available. According to Koopmans UVI has "seen an increase in our St. John student population from 37 to 47, and we are only at the beginning of the process." In addition to being used by students, the STJAC provides the entire St. John community with access to the Small Business Development Center, access to the general library and Wi-Fi networks, and conference rooms for meetings.

Currently, the STJAC is undergoing a relocation from the MarketPlace to the Department of Planning and Natural Resources in Cruz Bay.

=== Technology and research facilities ===
The legislature of the Virgin Islands chartered the University of the Virgin Islands Research and Technology Park to help expand the technology segment of the islands' economy, encourage more businesses to operate on the islands, and foster technology research and activities at the university. The university is filled with knowledgeable staff to help guide and support students in reaching their goals. The United States Department of Agriculture operates a large agricultural experiment station on the St. Croix campus working on agroforestry, aquaponics, biotechnology, forage agronomy, and tilapia farming. The university also own and run the Etelman Observatory.

== Academics ==
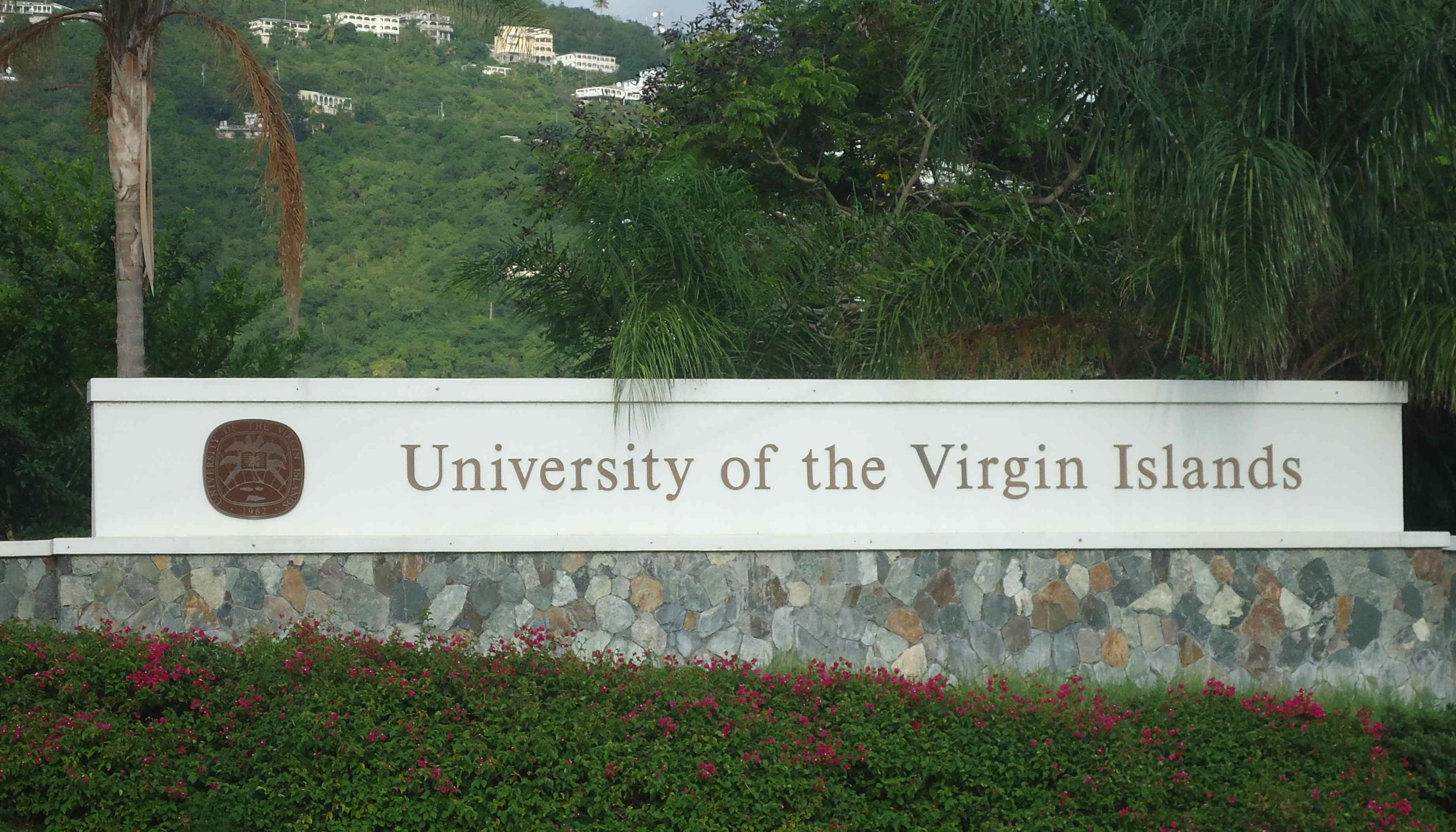
Entrance sign

The university has five academic divisions: Business, Education, Humanities and Social Sciences, Nursing, and Science and Mathematics. UVI offers various graduate degree and undergraduate degree programs. The graduate programs consist of a Specialist Degree in Education Specialist in School Psychology and the following Master's degrees: Master of Arts in education, Master of Arts in Mathematics for Secondary Teachers, Master of Business Administration, Master of Marine and Environmental Science, Master of Psychology, and Master of Public Administration. The Undergraduate Degree Programs are divided into several categories: Bachelor of Arts, Bachelor of Science, Associate of Arts, Associate of Science, and Associate of Applied Science.

Its liberal arts curriculum is accredited by the Middle States Association of Colleges and Schools. In addition, the university works to recruit local, national and international students to broaden and create a diversified student population, as 95% of its current students are natives of the US Virgin Islands.

The university also has several academic programs under its College of Science and Mathematics. One of these is an engineering program, where students attend UVI for three years and then transfer to either Columbia University, the University of Florida, Washington University in St. Louis, or the University of South Carolina (Columbia) to complete the last two years of their engineering studies. After completing the program, students will acquire a Bachelor of Science in Applied Mathematics from UVI and a Bachelor of Science in their specialization of engineering from the partner university. The Bachelor of Science in Computer Science with concentration in computational biology is offered on both St. Thomas and St. Croix. Students will be able to focus in fields related to parallel computing, data mining, bioinformatics, computational science or cyber-security.

The university also has an early medical school selection program with Boston University which affords selected students to study for three years at UVI and then transfer to Boston University Medical School in their senior year. They are then granted the opportunity to take medical school courses early. The university also holds several National Science Foundation-funded research grants and programs including MBRS-RISE, SEAGEP, HBCU-UP, and MARC under its Emerging Caribbean Scientist (ECS) program. The mission of the ECS programs is to increase research training and promote excellence for science, technology, engineering, mathematics and psychology students at the University of the Virgin Islands. The university fosters research by hosting research symposiums every semester where students are given the opportunity to present research projects conducted both locally and abroad, to the UVI faculty and the Virgin Islands community.

=== The Caribbean Writer ===
The Caribbean Writer – subtitled "Where the Caribbean Imagination Embraces the World" – is an international, refereed, literary journal, founded in 1986 and published annually by UVI. The stated mission of the journal is to "publish quality writing by established and emerging writers that reflects the culture of the Caribbean; promote and foster a strong literary tradition; serve as an institute for the development of emerging writers throughout the Caribbean". The current editor of the journal is Alscess Lewis-Brown. The journal's founding editor was Erika J. Waters, now professor emeritus of English at UVI. Subsequent editors have included Marvin Williams, Opal Palmer Adisa, and Tregenza Roach. The Caribbean Writer announced the past issues online in the Digital Library of the Caribbean (dLOC) as Open Access in 2016.

=== Marine biology program ===
The marine biology program attracts students from all parts of the world. The university is next to John Brewers Bay, which hosts a variety of marine life and is studied by both undergrad and masters students.

=== National Student Exchange (NSE) ===
At UVI, students from around the nation are allowed to participate in a semester or year-long exchange to UVI through the National Student Exchange. Tuition is paid toward either the student's home or host school. Students who attend UVI are also able to participate in the NSE program as long as they have completed their freshman year.

=== Online programs ===
In 2018, the UVI started offering undergraduate and graduate degree programs online in science, arts & business administration. Courses start at the second Wednesday of each month and run for eight weeks. In addition to new programs, the UVI online students will also have the option to complete a mini-residency program on the island of St. Thomas while earning academic credit.

== Student life ==
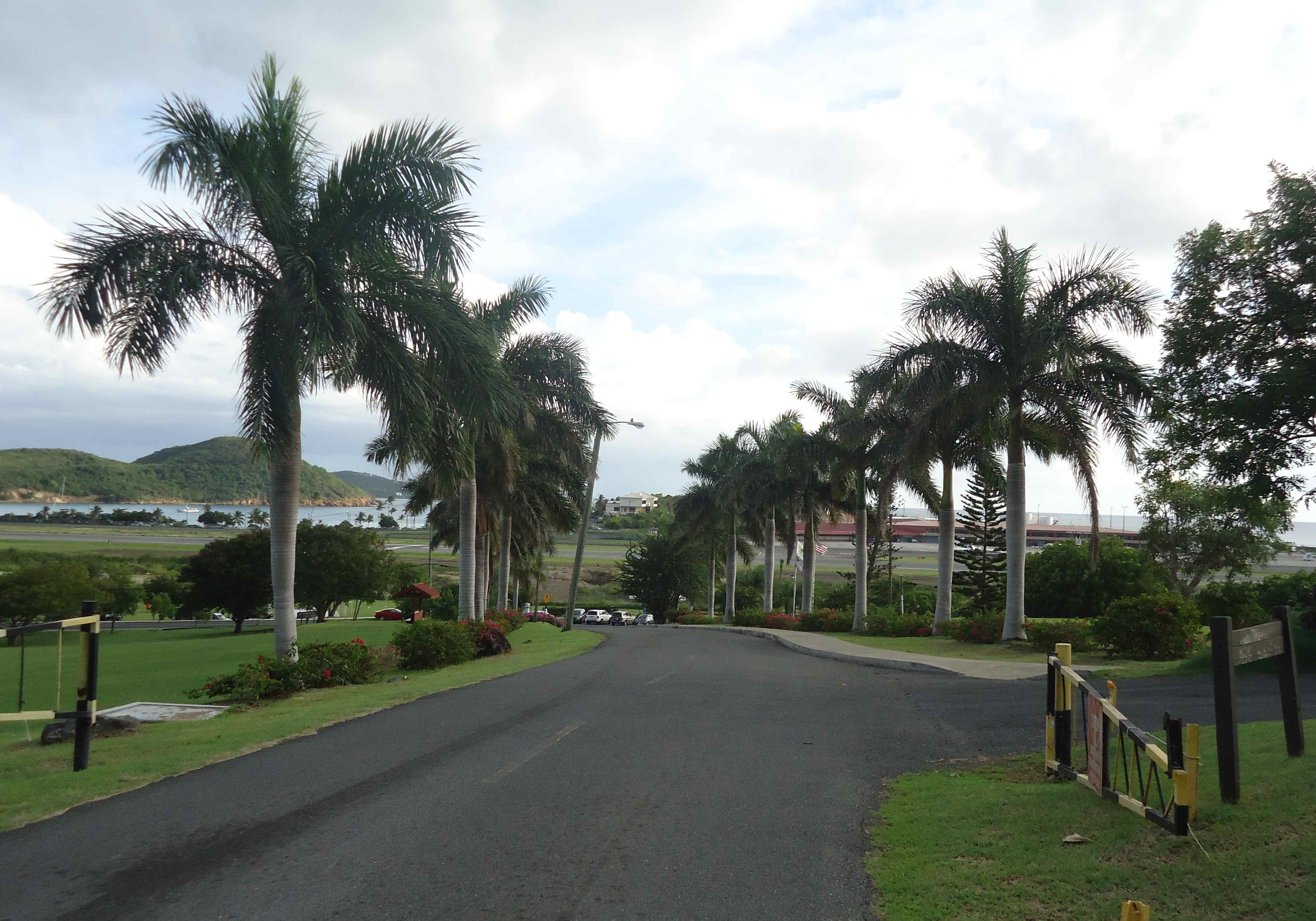
View from campus

The university offers counselling and career services including interpersonal, personal, social and cognitive development education.

=== Clubs and organizations ===
At the University of the Virgin Islands St. Thomas campus there are various clubs and Greek Life organizations such as Alpha Phi Alpha fraternity, Alpha Kappa Alpha sorority, Delta Sigma Theta sorority, Anguilla Student Association, Chess Club, Criminal Justice Club, Foods Committee, Golden Key Int'l Honour Society, Japanese Club, Psychology Student Association, Queen's Committee, Social & Cultural Committee, Sports Committee, Student Nursing Association, UVI ACS Student Chemistry Club, UVI French Club, UVI St. Kitts/Nevis Association, Dominican Association, BVI Association, Interact (in conjunction with the local Rotary International Club), Queens Court Club, R.E.A.C.H, Carnival Committee, Cheerleading Squad and Dance Team. UVI's Student Government Association is active on both campuses.

== Athletics ==
The University of the Virgin Islands (UVI) athletic teams are called the Buccaneers. The school colors are blue, white and gold. The university is a member of the National Association of Intercollegiate Athletics (NAIA), primarily competing in the HBCU Athletic Conference (HBCUAC), formerly the Gulf Coast Athletic Conference (GCAC), since the 2023–24 academic year. The Buccaneers previously competed from 2016–17 until 2022–23 as an NAIA Independent within the Continental Athletic Conference and in the Inter-university Athletic League of Puerto Rico (LAI; Liga Atlética Interuniversitaria de Puerto Rico in Spanish).

UVI competes in five intercollegiate varsity sports: Men's sports include basketball and track & field; while women's sports compete in basketball and track & field; and co-ed sports include eSports. Former sports included soccer, tennis, volleyball, cross country, swimming and table tennis.

=== Coaches ===
Currently, the head coach of UVI's men's basketball team is Jeffery Jones. The head coach of the women's basketball team is Reggie Carrick.

=== Tournaments ===
The University of the Virgin Islands hosts the Paradise Jam tournament in November of every year. NCAA Division I and II basketball teams from across the U.S. mainland compete in a men's and women's basketball tournament. The tournament has national coverage and is a major event in the Virgin Islands.

== Notable alumni ==
Name	Class year	Notability	Reference(s)
Shawn Richards		Member of the National Assembly of Saint Kitts and Nevis	
Ricky Skerritt	1980	UVI's first-ever Rhodes scholar, businessman, Saint Kitts and Nevis cabinet minister and manager of the West Indies cricket team.	
Silveria Jacobs	1992	Prime Minister of Sint Maarten	
Kenneth Gittens		Majority Leader of the Legislature of the Virgin Islands	
