= David Hall (university administrator) =

American law professor and university administrator

President of the University of the Virgin Islands
- In office August 1, 2009 – June 30, 2024
- Preceded by: LaVerne E. Ragster
- Succeeded by: Safiya George

Provost and Senior Vice-President for Academic Affairs, Northeastern University
- In office 1998–2002

Dean of Northeastern University School of Law
- In office 1993–2002

Personal details
- Born: Savannah, Georgia
- Education: Kansas State University (BA; University of Oklahoma (MA, JD); Harvard Law School (LLM, SJD)
- Profession: Professor

David Hall is an American law professor and academic. He was the president of the University of the Virgin Islands from 2009 to 2024. Prior to that position, he was the Provost of Northeastern University and Dean of the Northeastern University School of Law. He was a professor of law at the University of Mississippi and the University of Oklahoma.

While at Kansas State University, he played on the basketball team from 1969 to 1972 and was inducted into its Hall of Fame.
