= Whycliffe Cameron =

President of the West Indies Cricket Board

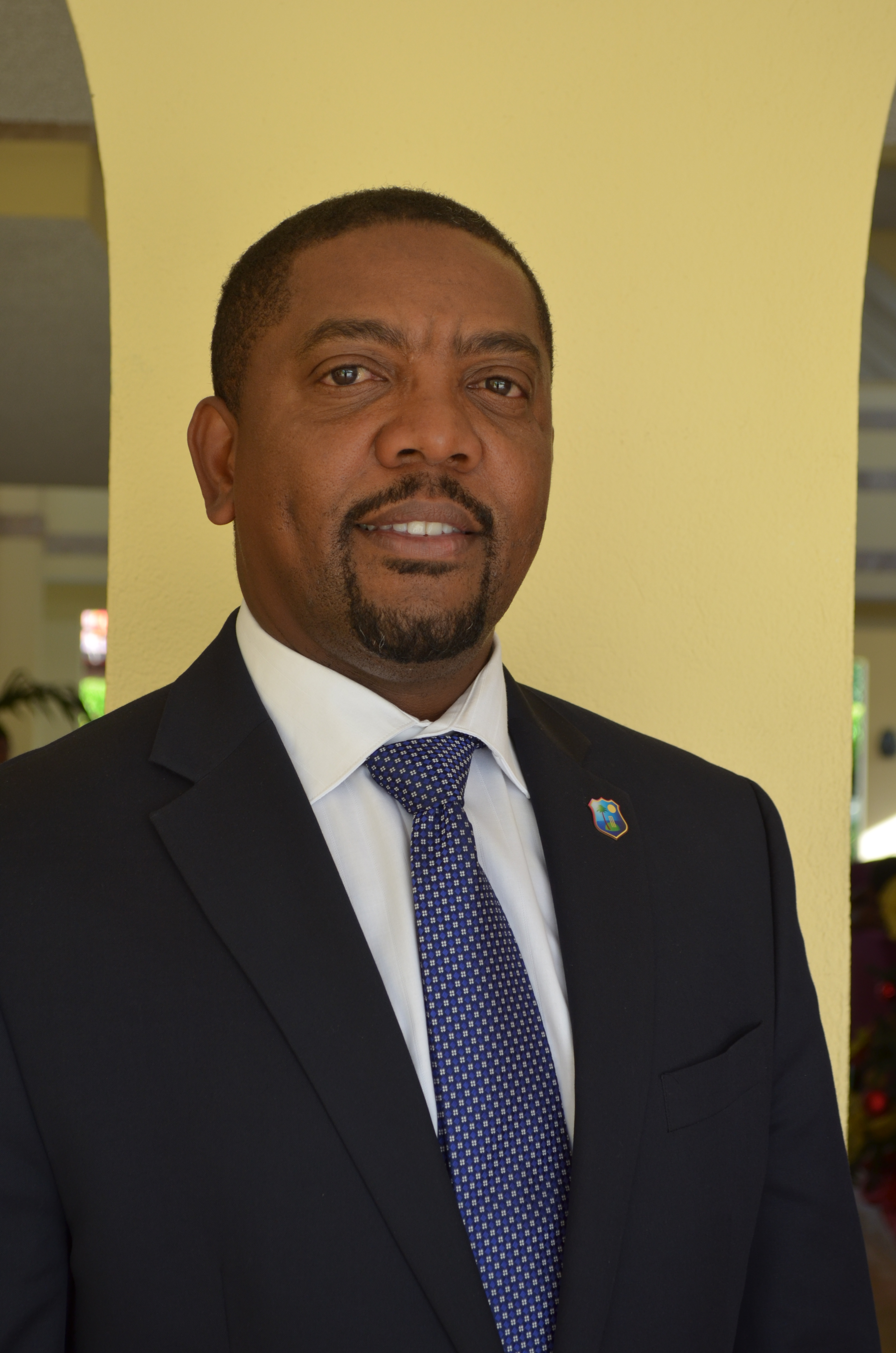
Whycliffe Cameron in 2015

Whycliffe "Dave" Cameron (born 8 April 1971) is the former president of the West Indies Cricket Board (WICB) Inc. He was elected the 18th president of the WICB in March 2013.

== Career ==
He has served as the vice president of the St. Ann Parish Association, Team Manager and President of Kensington Cricket Club. He was also Treasurer for the Jamaica Cricket Association.

Cameron attended Clan Carthy Primary School in Kingston, Jamaica and has a first class honours BSc in Hotel Management from the University of the West Indies.

== President of the West Indies Cricket Board ==
A WICB director between 2002 and 2019, Cameron served as vice-president during Julian Hunte's tenure as president, 2007-13. In the 2013 election Cameron beat the incumbent Hunte 7-5. His running mate, Emmanuel Nanthan of Dominica, became the new vice-president, beating Barbados Cricket Association president Joel Garner. Cameron, 42, was nominated by the Jamaica Cricket Association and seconded by the Windward Cricket Board.

His term has been marked by continuing controversy. He deliberately keeps a business-like and distant relationship with players, but with an open door. He played against Chris Gayle in club cricket.
