= Estate Brewers Bay =

- U.S. National Register of Historic Places
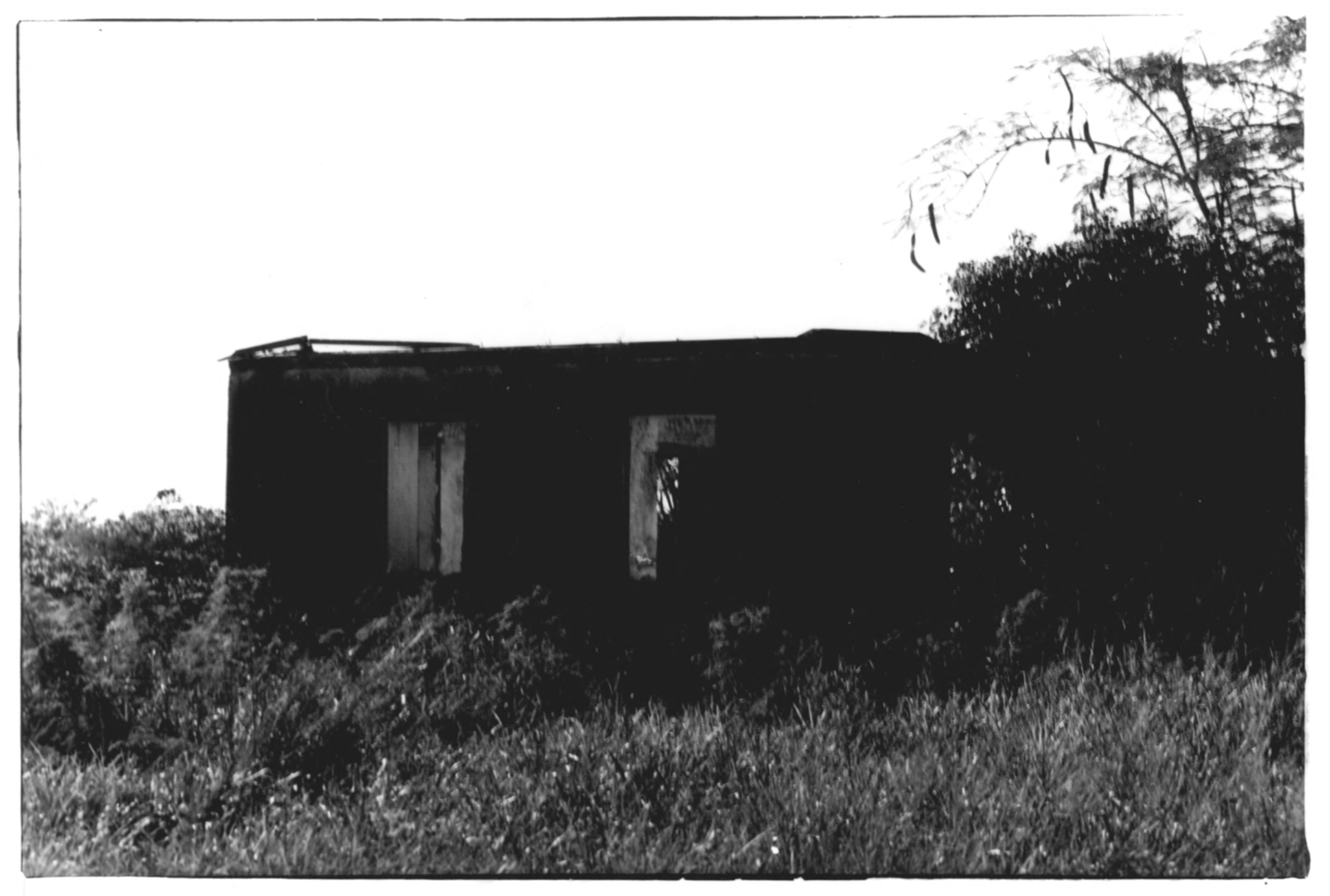
- Brewers Bay Sugar Factory

- Location within the U.S. Virgin Islands
- Nearest city: Charlotte Amalie, Virgin Islands
- Coordinates: 18°20′50″N 64°58′47″W
- Area: less than one acre
- Built: c. 1856
- NRHP reference No.: 78002727
- Added to NRHP: July 31, 1978

The Estate Brewers Bay, located near the University of the Virgin Islands and John Brewers Bay Beach about 2 miles (3.2 km) west of Charlotte Amalie on Saint Thomas, U.S. Virgin Islands, is a historic sugar plantation which was listed on the National Register of Historic Places in 1978.

Surviving on the site, at least as of 1977, are the ruins of a sugar factory, later adapted as a residence, and of an animal-powered mill.

The first records of ownership are in 1855; it appeared on a map in 1856.
