= List of international cricketers from the Windward Islands =

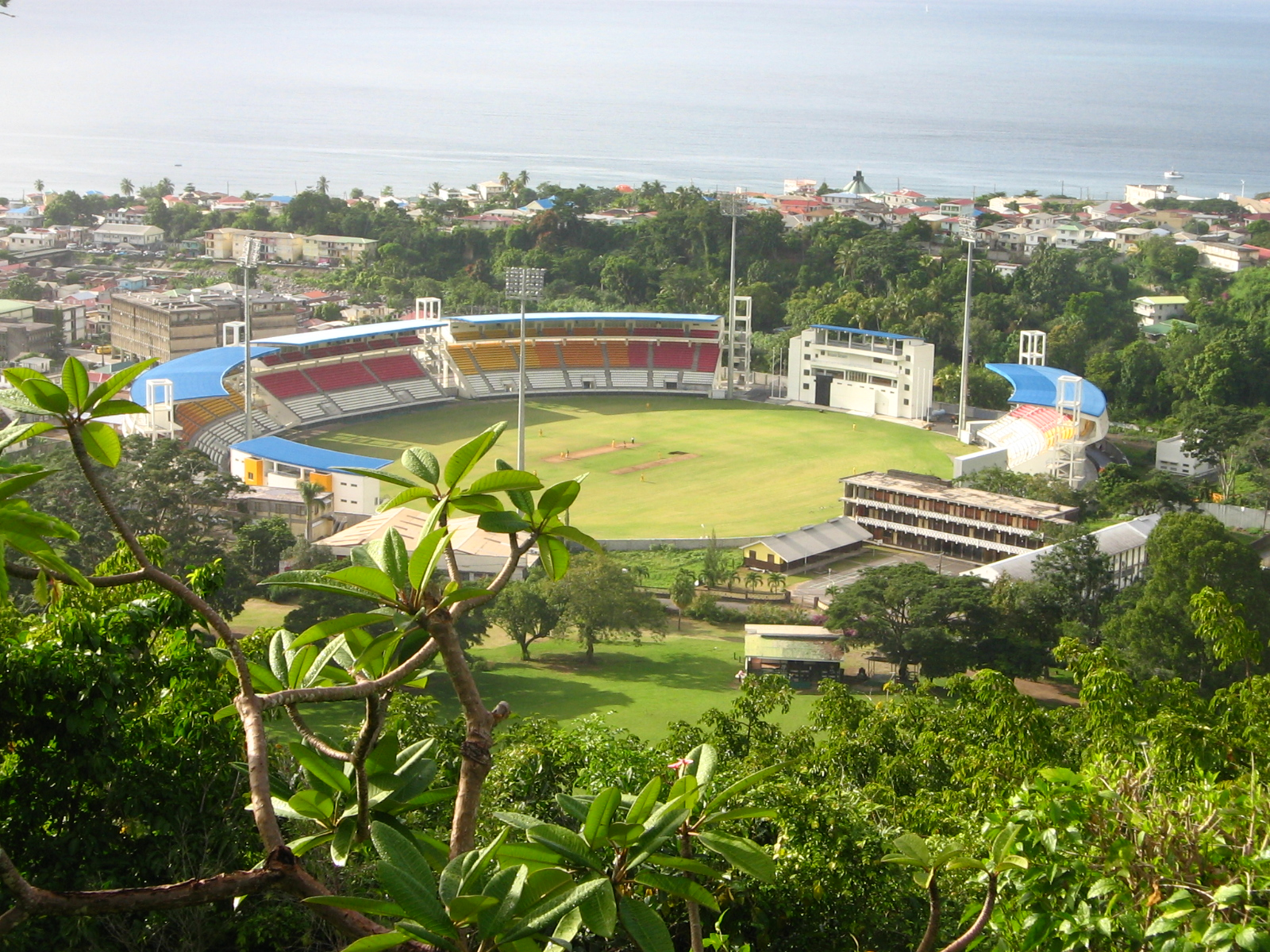
Windsor Park in Dominica is one of the home grounds of the Windward Islands cricket team.

The Windward Islands are one of the regions which make up the West Indies cricket team. It has produced international cricketers in all forms of the game—Tests, One Day Internationals (ODIs) and Twenty20 Internationals (T20Is). In cricketing terms the Windward Islands are made up from the following nations: Dominica, Grenada, Saint Lucia and Saint Vincent and the Grenadines. The current captain of the West Indies team is the Saint Lucian Darren Sammy, who is the only player from the Windwards to hold this position.

The Vincentian Alphonso Roberts became the first player from the Windwards to represent the West Indies when he played his only Test match in 1956. The only players from the Windwards to have played in over thirty Test matches are the Grenadians Junior Murray and Devon Smith. Smith is the highest Test and ODI run scorer from the Windwards. Winston Davis is the leading Test wicket taker from the Windwards, while Nixon McLean has taken the most ODI wickets.

== Key ==
- Apps denotes the number of appearances the player has made.
- Runs denotes the number of runs scored by the player.
- Wkts denotes the number of wickets taken by the player.

West Indies captains

Statistics correct as of: 2011 Cricket World Cup

| Name | International career | Apps | Runs | Wkts | Apps | Runs | Wkts | Apps | Runs | Wkts | References |
| Name | International career | Tests | | | ODIs | | | T20Is | | | References |
|---|---|---|---|---|---|---|---|---|---|---|---|
| Alphonso Roberts (St. Vincent) | 1956 | 1 | 28 | 0 | – | – | – | – | – | – | |
| Mike Findlay (St. Vincent) | 1969–1973 | 10 | 212 | 0 | – | – | – | – | – | – | |
| Grayson Shillingford (Dominica) | 1969–1972 | 7 | 57 | 15 | – | – | – | – | – | – | |
| Irvine Shillingford (Dominica) | 1977–1978 | 4 | 218 | 0 | 2 | 30 | 0 | – | – | – | |
| Norbert Phillip (Dominica) | 1978–1979 | 9 | 297 | 28 | 1 | 0 | 1 | – | – | – | |
| Winston Davis (St. Vincent) | 1983–1988 | 15 | 202 | 45 | 35 | 28 | 39 | – | – | – | |
| Ian Allen (St. Vincent) | 1991 | 2 | 5 | 5 | – | – | – | – | – | – | |
| Junior Murray (Grenada) | 1992–2002 | 33 | 918 | 0 | 55 | 678 | 0 | – | – | – | |
| Cameron Cuffy (St. Vincent) | 1994–2002 | 15 | 58 | 43 | 41 | 62 | 41 | – | – | – | |
| Nixon McLean (St. Vincent) | 1996–2003 | 19 | 368 | 44 | 45 | 314 | 46 | – | – | – | |
| Rawl Lewis (Grenada) | 1997–2009 | 5 | 89 | 4 | 28 | 291 | 22 | 1 | 0 | 0 | |
| Adam Sanford (Dominica) | 2002–2004 | 11 | 72 | 30 | – | – | – | – | – | – | |
| Devon Smith (Grenada) | 2003–2011 | 32 | 1,370 | 0 | 39 | 981 | 0 | 6 | 203 | 0 | |
| Darren Sammy (St. Lucia) | 2004–2012 | 27 | 984 | 70 | 75 | 880 | 53 | 26 | 171 | 30 | |
| Deighton Butler (St. Vincent) | 2005–2006 | – | – | – | 5 | 25 | 3 | 1 | 0 | 0 | |
| Andre Fletcher (Grenada) | 2008–2010 | – | – | – | 15 | 256 | 0 | 14 | 137 | 0 | |
| Nelon Pascal (Grenada) | 2009–2010 | 2 | 12 | 0 | 1 | 0 | 0 | – | – | – | |
| Shane Shillingford (Dominica) | 2010–2012 | 8 | 116 | 29 | – | – | – | – | – | – | |
| Johnson Charles (St. Lucia) | 2011–2012 | – | – | – | 5 | 121 | 0 | 4 | 118 | 0 | |
| Miles Bascombe (St. Vincent) | 2011 | – | – | – | – | – | – | 1 | 3 | 0 | |
| Garey Mathurin (St. Lucia) | 2011–2012 | – | – | – | – | – | – | 3 | 4 | 4 | |

== See also ==
- List of West Indies Test cricketers
- List of West Indies ODI cricketers
- List of West Indies Twenty20 International cricketers
