= Rally 'Round the West Indies =

West Indian Cricket Anthem

Song by David Rudder

from the album Haiti
- Released: 1988
- Recorded: 1987
- Genre: Calypso
- Length: 5:59
- Label: Sire, Lypsoland, London
- Songwriter: David Rudder
- Producers: Joe R. Brown, Charlie's Roots

"Rally 'Round the West Indies" is a calypso song written and composed by David Rudder, and first recorded in 1987 for the album Haiti by David Rudder and Charlie's Roots. An adapted version is used as the anthem for the West Indian Cricket Team.

The song was written in response to complaints about the West Indian Cricket Team, whose fortunes had begun to turn after a dominant period during the 1980s.

== Overview ==
The lyrics reference sociopolitical issues, the Haitian Revolution and cricketing laws that were seen as unjust and introduced to reduce the West Indian dominance of cricket. With Rudder referencing Haitian general Toussaint Louverture who was imprisoned and died shortly before the Haitian Revolution succeeded, as well as Jean-Jacques Dessalines who succeeded Toussaint and was Haiti's first independent leader. Infighting among the islands, as well as the belief that the West Indies had been forgotten and mistreated once they had outlived their usefulness to the United Kingdom, are also referenced within the song.

== Use as West Indian Anthem ==
In 1999, the West Indies Cricket Board was in need of an anthem to play before a home series with Australia. Rally was chosen, although the lyrics needed to be adapted to be suitable for this use. Rudder continued the theme of the region being mistreated, with the opening line "No noble thoughts, brought us here to these islands.", but was forced to change the line to "this region", due to complaints from Guyana, who are located on the South American continent. The song was then chosen as the permanent anthem for the West Indian side. During the 2024 ICC Men's T20 World Cup, Rudder sang the anthem before the West Indies group stage match against New Zealand in San Fernando.
