= University of the Virgin Islands Research and Technology Park =

Coordinates: 17°43′10.42″N 64°48′0.31″W

The University of the Virgin Islands Research and Technology Park (RTPark) is the first independent research and e-technology park located in the U.S. Virgin Islands (USVI).

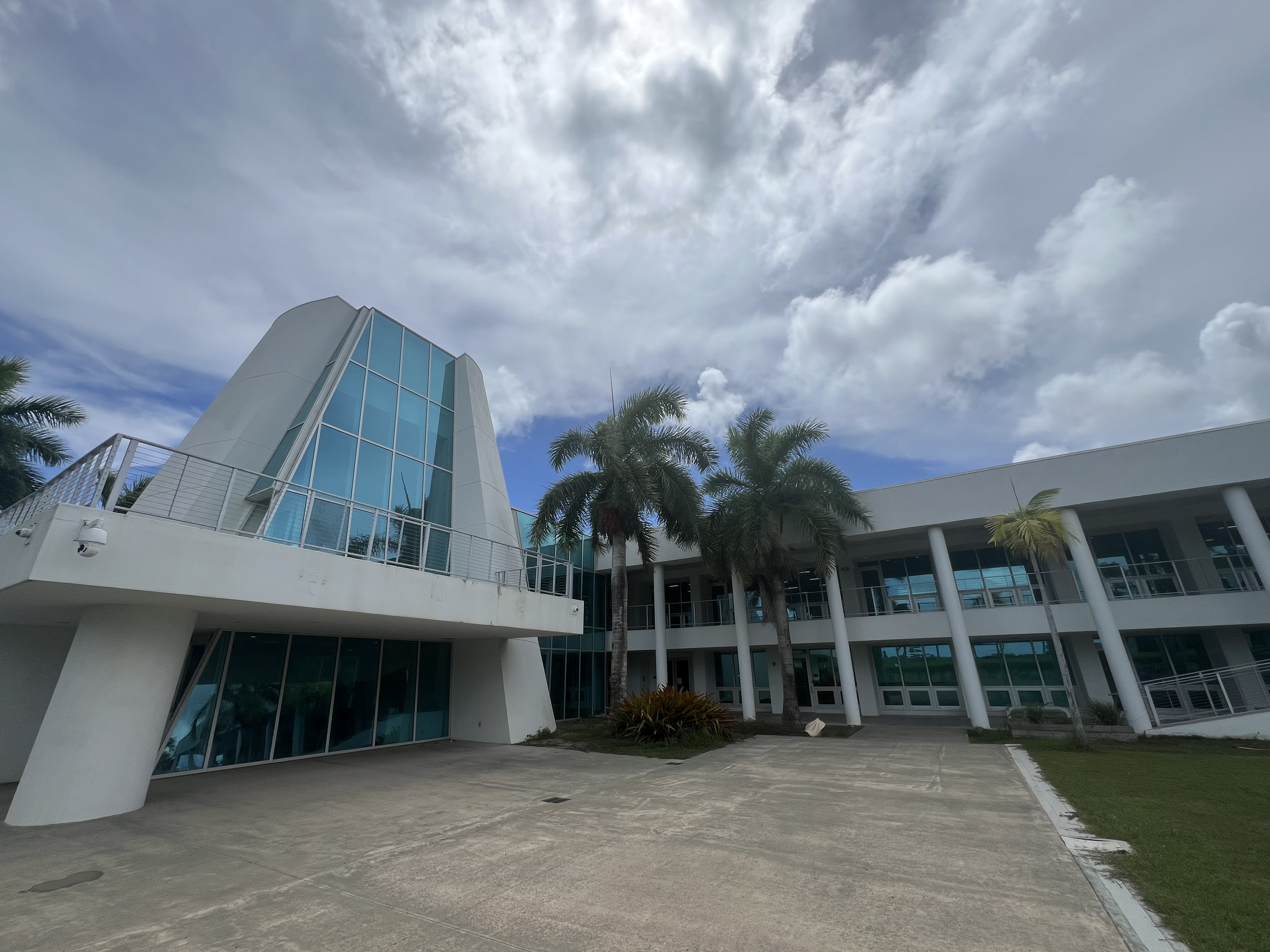
The Research and Technology Park's building contains office, laboratory, and classroom spaces.

== Overview ==
RTPark was launched in 2002, under the legislature of Title 17, Chapters 34 and 43 of the U.S. Virgin Islands Code., It was the first government-sponsored public-private collaboration for technology development in the USVI. It was formed as a public corporation by the government of the U.S. Virgin Islands and is headquartered on the St. Croix campus of the University of the Virgin Islands. It was launched following a feasibility study and public input forums. After considering the reports from the study and forum, Governor Charles Wesley Turnbull signed Act 6502 to establish RTPark in 2002. It was created as a public corporation via a Protected Cell Corporation function. As part of RTPark's legislative charter, tax incentives can be extended to knowledge-based businesses that apply and are approved as RTPark tenants.

== Management and governance ==
The executive director, Eric Sonnier, manages operations and reports to a seven-member Board of Directors. The Board members include:

- The Chair of the University of the Virgin Islands (UVI) Board of Trustees
- The President of UVI
- Two additional UVI Board of Trustees members
- Three members appointed by the Governor of the U.S. Virgin Islands
