= Kishore Shallow =

Cricket administrator

Dr. Kishore Shallow
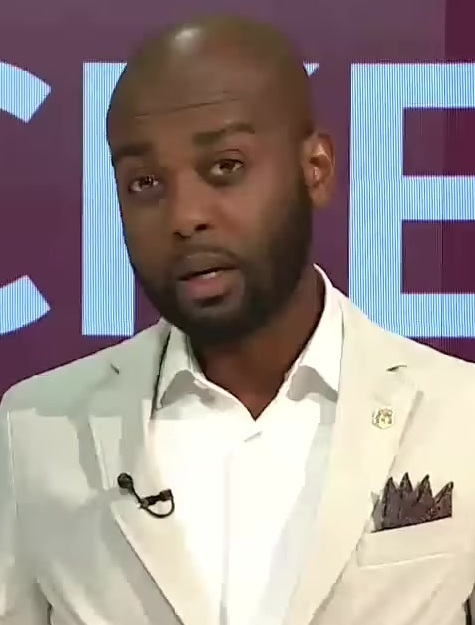
- Kishore Shallow in 2024
- Minister: Minister of Tourism, Civil Aviation, & Sustainable Development

President of Cricket West Indies
- Incumbent
- Assumed office 2023
- Preceded by: Ricky Skerritt

President of Windward Islands Cricket Board of Control
- In office 2019–2023
- Preceded by: Emmanuel Nanthan
- Succeeded by: Dwain Gill

President of Saint Vincent and the Grenadines Cricket Association
- In office 2014–2020
- Preceded by: Julian Jack
- Succeeded by: Romel Currency

Personal details
- Born: 23 January 1984 (age 42) Saint Vincent and the Grenadines
- Education: Walden University; University of Wales Institute, Cardiff; University of Sunderland

Dr. Kishore Shallow is a cricket administrator and politician from St. Vincent and the Grenadines. He is currently the President of Cricket West Indies (CWI). Previously, he held positions as President of Windward Islands Cricket Board of Control, and President of St. Vincent and the Grenadines Cricket Association. Dr. Shallow is also a director on the International Cricket Council, the world governing body for cricket.

== CWI Leadership ==
Dr. Shallow took over leadership of Cricket West Indies from Ricky Skerritt on March 25, 2023, at the 24th Annual General Meeting of the organisation. He and Vice President, Azim Bassarath of Trinidad and Tobago were unopposed at the elections.

Few weeks into his presidency, Dr. Shallow introduced new policies for Women in West Indies Cricket. He changed an old policy where only men traveled first class on long haul flights, to facilitate women traveling similar category. A second policy to ensure the woman also had single rooms on international duty was also established. Barbados Prime Minister, Honorable Mia Mottley publicly commended Dr. Shallow for these initiatives. Shallow has shared similar sentiments with Caribbean leaders about the need for governance reform at CWI.

In February 2025, Shallow was nominated for a second term as president of CWI. Both him and Vice President were unopposed for consecutive terms. Their ratification came at the CWI AGM on May 29, 2025, with Shallow receiving full support from the shareholders (12), while Bassarath received eight. Following the introduction of term limits by the Shallow-led administration, both President and Vice President will serve a three year term.

Prior to becoming President, Dr. Shallow served as Vice President, from 2019 - 2023. In March 2019, Shallow ran a successful campaign for Vice President of Cricket West Indies, along with his running mate, Ricky Skerritt, who was elected as President. In his first term as Vice President, Shallow was chair of the CWI selection task force that produced the first ever selection policy for Cricket West Indies. In 2021, Shallow was re-elected unopposed as CWI Vice President for his second term.

His election as a Member of Parliament in his home country in November 2025 has sparked conversation about conflict. However, Dr. Shallow has confirmed that he will complete his term as president. His commitment is to complete tasks set out in the CWI Strategic Plan by 2027 but does not intend to stand for re-election.

== SVGCA Presidency ==
Shallow was president of St. Vincent and the Grenadines Cricket Association (SVGCA) from 2014 until December 2020. Under his tenure, SVGCA won National Sports Association of the Year twice. He was recognized for his sterling contribution to SVG cricket as president. Shallow was president of the SVGCA when it hosted the first recognized cricket tournament during the COVID-19 pandemic, the Vincy Premier League T10.

== Public Figure ==
Dr. Shallow is the first Vincentian to become the President of Cricket West Indies. He became a National Sporting Ambassador in 2019. The announcement was made in the Independence Address of Prime Minister Dr. Ralph Gonsalves on October 27, 2019.

He was also a CARICOM Youth Ambassador, where he served as Vice Dean, Information and Communication. During Dr. Shallow's tenure, he served on the CARICOM Regional Commission on Marijuana, a taskforce established to examine the social, economic, health and legal issues surrounding the various aspects of marijuana use in the Caribbean and the implications.

== Political career ==
Dr. Shallow was elected as the Member of Parliament for the constituency of North Leeward in St. Vincent and the Grenadines on November 27, 2025. He contested on the ticket of the New Democratic Party, which gained the majority of the seats to secure government. At the swearing in ceremony of the cabinet on December 2, 2025, Shallow was appointed Minister of Tourism and Maritime Affairs, later changed to the Ministry of Tourism, Civil Aviation, and Sustainable Development.

Shallow was elected as a candidate for the opposition party in September 2024. A month prior, in a national poll conducted, he was considered a popular prospect for Prime Minister of the country. In response to Shallow's candidacy, the former Prime Minister of St. Vincent and the Grenadines, Hon. Dr. Ralph Gonsalves argued that it is a conflict of interest for Shallow to be a political candidate while serving as President of Cricket West Indies. Dr. Shallow challenged Dr. Gonsalves' perspective suggesting that there is no conflict.

== Personal life ==
Shallow was born on 23 January 1984 in St. Vincent and the Grenadines, and grew up in the small community of Coull's Hill. He has a doctorate from Walden University, a master's degree from University of Wales, Institute of Cardiff, and a bachelor's degree from University of Sunderland. He is the father of three children, and is married to Lauren McIntosh-Shallow, an attorney-at-law.
