= Cricket West Indies =

Governing body for cricket in the West Indies

- Sport: Cricket
- Jurisdiction: Antigua and Barbuda; Barbados; Dominica; Grenada; Guyana; Jamaica; Saint Kitts and Nevis; Saint Lucia; Saint Vincent and the Grenadines; Trinidad and Tobago; Anguilla; British Virgin Islands; Montserrat; Sint Maarten; United States Virgin Islands
- Abbreviation: CWI
- Founded: 1920 (106 years ago)
- Affiliation: International Cricket Council
- Affiliation date: May 31, 1926; 100 years ago
- Location: St. John's, Antigua and Barbuda
- President: Kishore Shallow
- CEO: Chris Dehring
- Vice president: Azim Bassarath
- Sponsor: CG Insurance, Macron (sportswear), Dafabet, Blue Waters, Kookaburra Sport, Masuri
- Replaced: West Indies Cricket Board of Control; West Indies Cricket Board

Official website
- www.windiescricket.com
- Other key staff: Director of Cricket: Miles Bascombe
- (Cricket West Indies)

Cricket West Indies (CWI) is the governing body for cricket in the West Indies (a sporting confederation of over a dozen mainly English-speaking Caribbean countries and dependencies that once formed the British West Indies). It was originally formed in the early 1920s as the West Indies Cricket Board of Control, but changed its name to West Indies Cricket Board (WICB) in 1996. In November 2015, the Board resolved to rename itself as Cricket West Indies as part of a restructuring exercise that would also see the creation of a separate commercial body. This rebranding formally occurred in May 2017.

CWI has been a full member of the International Cricket Council (ICC) since 1926. It operates the West Indies cricket team and West Indies A cricket team, organising Test tours and one-day internationals with other teams. It also organises domestic cricket in the West Indies, including the Regional Four Day Competition and the Regional Super50 domestic one-day (List A) competition. The CWI has also collaborated with Sir Allen Stanford in the organisation of the domestic Stanford 20/20 competition for the Twenty20 format of cricket. Later they created their own Twenty20 league called Caribbean Twenty20 after disbanding Stanford 20/20. In 2013 they created Caribbean Premier League, a Professional Twenty20 league.

CWI's membership includes the six territorial cricket associations of the various countries and territories which contest the West Indies first-class and limited-overs competition in the Caribbean. Each provides two directors, in addition to a number of non-member directors. Two of these associations are themselves multi-national boards representing a number of countries and dependencies.

The president of CWI is Dr Kishore Shallow, who replaced Ricky Skerrit in 2023. Chris Dehring is its chief executive officer.

Since 2005, per an ICC mandate, the West Indies Women's Cricket Federation (WIWCF) has been integrated with CWI. The President of the WIWCF is Carol Whilby-Maxwell and the Secretary is Michael Seepersaud.

CWI is charged with aiding regional development of cricket in the Americas region, under the ICC's development program.

== History ==
Pre-1999 Flag of the West Indies Cricket Board and Team

Flag of the West Indies Cricket Board and Team used until mid-2017

From the 1880s onwards there had been no central body to co-ordinate the Inter-Colonial Tournaments and matches, select composite West Indian XIs for tours and against touring sides and to organise the West Indian tours of England, Canada and the United States. Such organisation as there was, was done by an informal coalition of the major clubs in the region. West Indian cricketers however had felt the need for the establishment of such an organisation although geography and culture were to make such a task difficult. However, with the help of one influential Marylebone Cricket Club member, R. H. Mallett (the manager of the 1906 and 1923 West Indian tours and future manager of the 1930–31 West Indian tour to Australia), representatives of the various territories finally got together and ultimately formed the West Indies Cricket Board of Control. The preliminary meeting was in Bridgetown, Barbados, from which the informal West Indies Cricket Conference was founded in 1926. The West Indies Cricket Conference held its first official meeting on 22 January 1927 at the Bridgetown Club in Barbados attended by Mallett and representatives from the Windward Islands, Trinidad and Tobago, Barbados and Demerara (British Guiana). Delegates from Jamaica and the Leeward Islands were invited but unfortunately were unable to attend. At this January meeting the delegates present decided to form the West Indies Cricket Board of Control (WICBC) which would be composed of a president, a secretary and two delegates each from Barbados, Demerara, Jamaica and Trinidad and Tobago and one delegate each from the Leeward Islands and Windward Islands. The WICBC's first meeting was held on 17 and 18 June 1927 in Port-of-Spain, Trinidad with Harold Austin (the former captain of the 1906 and 1923 West Indian tours of England) serving as the first president. The board as constituted was enlarged in 1982 when the Leeward and Windward Islands were given the same representation as the other full Members. The president was appointed by the board at an ordinary general meeting and had to be a person resident in the West Indies who had shown a keen and active interest in West Indies cricket. His term of office was for two years (and eligible for re-election) or until his successor was appointed. Board members were also thenceforth to be appointed by their Cricket Associations although in British Guiana the Georgetown Cricket Club held this responsibility until 1943, and in Trinidad the Queens Park Oval Club until 1981 when their respective cricket associations were given recognition. There was a provision for associate members who would be entitled to attend meetings but not to move resolutions or vote. Bermuda and Belize had been the only members in this category prior to their cessation as Associate Members. According to Ram Hiralal, former president of the Suriname Cricket Association, up until 2002 when Suriname applied for and gained affiliate membership of the ICC, it was also an associate member of the West Indies Cricket Board.

== Member associations ==
- Barbados Cricket Association (BCA)
- Guyana Cricket Board (GCB)
- Jamaica Cricket Association (JCA)
- Trinidad and Tobago Cricket Board (TTCB)
- Leeward Islands Cricket Association (LICA), itself composed of:
  - Anguilla Cricket Association
  - Antigua and Barbuda Cricket Association
  - British Virgin Islands Cricket Association
  - Montserrat Cricket Association
  - Nevis Cricket Association (for the island of Nevis alone)
  - St Kitts Cricket Association (for the island of Saint Kitts alone)
  - St Maarten Cricket Association
  - United States Virgin Islands Cricket Association
- Windward Islands Cricket Board of Control (WICBC), itself composed of:
  - Dominica Cricket Association
  - Grenada Cricket Association
  - St Lucia Cricket Association
  - St Vincent and the Grenadines Cricket Association

== Domestic competitions ==
The West Indies' major men's domestic competitions are the Regional Four Day Competition (first-class competition) and the Regional Super50 (List A one-day competition) and more recently the Caribbean Premier League (domestic Twenty20 competition – replacing the Caribbean Twenty20, which in turn replaced the Stanford 20/20 that had been financed and organised by Allen Stanford). Meanwhile, the major women's domestic competitions are the Women's Super50 Cup and the Twenty20 Blaze.

Other CWI domestic competitions include the TCL Under-19 West Indies Challenge (three-day first-class competition), TCL Under-19 West Indies Challenge Limited Overs Series (one-day limited overs competition), CLICO West Indies Under-15 competition and the WIWCF Women's Senior Tournament. One prominent former competition (not originally organized by the WICB) was the Inter-Colonial Tournament.

In the case of the Regional Four Day Competition and the Regional Super50 the following first-class domestic teams participate:

- Barbados national cricket team
- Guyana national cricket team
- Jamaica national cricket team
- Leeward Islands cricket team
- Windward Islands cricket team
- Trinidad and Tobago national cricket team
- Combined Campuses and Colleges cricket team

In 1978 Belize had requested (through the then Belize Cricket Association) in a letter to the WICBC to participate in the Shell Shield and the List A competitions, but the WICBC was unable to entertain their request.

For the TCL Under-19 West Indies Challenge (both the first-class and limited overs competitions) it is the Under-19 squads for these teams which participate, while for the CLICO Under-15 West Indies tournament it is the Under-15 squads for these teams which participate. In the 2004 TCL Under-19 Challenge the Under-19 Bermuda national cricket team and an Under-19 combined Americas cricket team also took part.

In the women's WIWCF Senior Tournament and the Stanford 20/20 competition the separate components of the Leeward Islands and Windward Islands compete individually. Additionally for the Stanford 20/20 competition teams from outside the West Indies sporting confederation, but within the Caribbean, also compete including the Bahamas, Bermuda, the Cayman Islands, Cuba (which was barred from competing in 2008 by the US embargo), the Turks and Caicos Islands (both competing in 2008) as well as the Dominican Republic and Puerto Rico (announced for the 2009 edition of the Stanford 20/20).

In the Caribbean Premier League there are franchise teams competing, with each franchise currently representing one of the six traditional cricketing territories in the West Indies:

- Royals – representing Barbados
- Amazon Warriors – representing Guyana
- Tallawahs – representing Jamaica
- Patriots – representing St. Kitts and Nevis, and the rest of the Leeward Islands
- Kings – representing St. Lucia and the rest of the Windward Islands
- Knight Riders – representing Trinidad and Tobago
- Falcons – representing Antigua & Barbuda

== Principals of the West Indies Cricket Board ==
=== WICB(C) Presidents (men's cricket) ===
- Sir Harold Austin
- Laurie Yearwood
- Fred Grant
- Karl Nunes: 1945–1952
- Sir Errol Dos Santos
- John St Felix Dare: 1960–1966
- Tom Pierce
- Robert Cecil Marley
- Jeffrey Stollmeyer: 1974–1981
- Allan Rae: 1981–1988
- Sir Clyde Walcott: 1988–1993
- Captain Peter Short: 1993–1996
- Pat Rousseau: 1996–2001
- Reverend Wes Hall: 2001–2003
- Teddy Griffith: 2003–2005
- Ken Gordon: 2005–2007
- Julian Hunte: 2007–2013
- Whycliffe (Dave) Cameron: 2013–2019
- Ricky Skerritt: 2019–2023
- Dr. Kishore Shallow: 2023–present

=== WIWCF Presidents ===
- Carol Whilby-Maxwell

=== Secretaries or chief executive officers ===
- Stephen Camacho: 1982–2000
- Gregory Shillingford: 2000–2002
- Roger Brathwaite: 2003–2007 (acting from 2002)
- Bruce Aanensen: 2007–2007
- Donald Peters: 2007–2009
- Ernest Hilaire: 2009–2012
- Michael Muirhead: 2012–2016
- Johnny Grave: 2017–2025
- Chris Dehring: 2025–present

== See also ==
- Cricket in the West Indies
- Rally 'Round the West Indies
