= David Rudder =

Trinidadian calypsonian (born 1953)

The Honourable David Rudder OCC
- Born: David Michael Rudder; 6 May 1953 (age 73)
- Origin: Belmont, Port of Spain, Trinidad and Tobago
- Genres: Calypso, soca
- Occupations: Musician, singer, producer, songwriter
- Instruments: Vocals, guitar
- Years active: 1977–present
- Label: Sire/Warner Bros. Records (1986–90)
- Website: davidmichaelrudder.com

The Honourable David Michael Rudder OCC (born 6 May 1953) is a Trinidadian calypsonian, known to be one of the most successful calypsonians of all time. He performed as lead singer for the brass band Charlie's Roots. Nine years later, Rudder stepped outside the band, entering the calypso tent as a solo calypsonian in 1986, which was followed by an unprecedented rise to fame.

"Almost overnight he became a national hero of the order of Marley in Jamaica, Fela in Nigeria, and Springsteen in New Jersey," wrote Daisann McClane, American journalist and Worldbeat correspondent for Rolling Stone magazine.

Rudder's music quickly became the subject of music critics around the world: "From New York to London to Tokyo, where the Japanese have released a CD of Rudder's greatest hits complete with lyrics translated into Japanese, Rudder has been described as modern calypso's most innovative songwriter."

== Early life ==
Born in Belmont, Port of Spain, Trinidad and Tobago, one of nine children, Rudder spent much of his early life with his grandmother, a devout Baptist. He began singing with a calypso band at the age of 11. In his teens, he sang backup vocals in a calypso tent run by calypsonian Lord Kitchener, while earning his living as an accountant with the Trinidad Bus Company.

== Career ==
In 1977, Rudder joined Charlie's Roots, a leading band in Trinidad and Tobago, which launched with help and sponsorship from New York-based record producer Rawlston Charles. Rudder spent many years as one of the band's vocalists.

In 1986, he came to prominence on Andy Narell's album The Hammer, which produced two big hits: "The Hammer" (a tribute to the late pannist Rudolph Charles) and "Bahia Girl". This was followed in 1987 with "Calypso Music", a brilliant encapsulation of the history of calypso. In 1988, Rudder released what is widely considered his best album to date, Haiti, which included the title track, a tribute to the glory and suffering of Haiti; "Engine Room", which captured the energy of the steel band; and "Rally 'Round the West Indies", which (with modified lyrics) became the anthem of West Indies cricket.

In 1991, four tracks performed by Rudder were included in the soundtrack of the film Wild Orchid: "Dark Secret" (two versions), "Children Of Fire (Call Of Xango)", and "Just a Carnival", which includes Rudder in the final scene in the movie "performing" on the beach. In 1996, he was appointed a Goodwill Ambassador for the United Nations Development Programme (UNDP).

In 2008, Rudder did a soca collaboration with fellow Trinidadian Machel Montano, "Oil and Music" on Machel's 2007 album Flame On. In 2011, Rudder performed a soca collaboration called "Glow" with Barbados' "Queen of Soca" Alison Hinds. On 28 April 2022, Rudder's "Trini 2 De Bone" appeared in the FX comedy Atlanta in the seventh episode of season 3 also entitled "Trini 2 De Bone". He has released more than 30 albums and has performed in venues across the Caribbean, Europe, North and South America, Asia, and Africa.

In April 2023, Rudder announced that he had been diagnosed with Parkinson's disease. He would continue to write new material and give smaller concerts, but would cease exhausting performances after his 70th birthday.

== Awards and honours ==
In 1992, Rudder was awarded a Hummingbird Silver Medal by the Government of Trinidad and Tobago. He was later appointed, in 1996, as a Goodwill Ambassador to the United Nations Development Programme (UNDP). On 2 May 2018, Rudder was also bestowed the keys to the city of Port of Spain.

On 25 October 2015, the University of the West Indies (UWI) awarded Rudder the honorary degree Doctor of Letters (D.Litt.), in recognition of his "outstanding" contributions to Caribbean culture.

On 3 July 2022, Rudder was conferred with the Order of the Caribbean Community (OCC).

== Discography ==
Year	Album
2015	Catharsis
2008	Trinidad Stories
2004	Eclectica
2003	Blessed
2002	Farewell to the flesh
2001	The Autobiography of the Now
2000	Zero
1999	International Chantuelle
1998	Beloved
1997	Wrapped in Plain Brown Paper
1996	Tales from a Strange Land
1994	Lyrics Man
1993	Ministry of Rhythm
1993	Gilded Collection: Volume 1
1992	Frenzy
1991	Rough & Ready
1990	Sketches
1989	The Power & The Glory (with Charlie's Roots)
1988	Haiti (with Charlie's Roots)
1982	‘’Lorraine’’ (Manhattan Charlie’s Roots)

== Filmography ==
=== Film ===
Year	Title	Role	Director	Notes
1989	Wild Orchid	Himself	Zalman King	Performed the songs "Dark Secret", "Children of Fire (Call of Xango)", and "Just a Carnival" used in the film.
2017	Brown Girl Begins	Drummer	Sharon Lewis	

=== Television ===
Year	Title	Role	Notes
1988	Sugar Cane Arrows	Bolt	
