= Etelman Observatory =

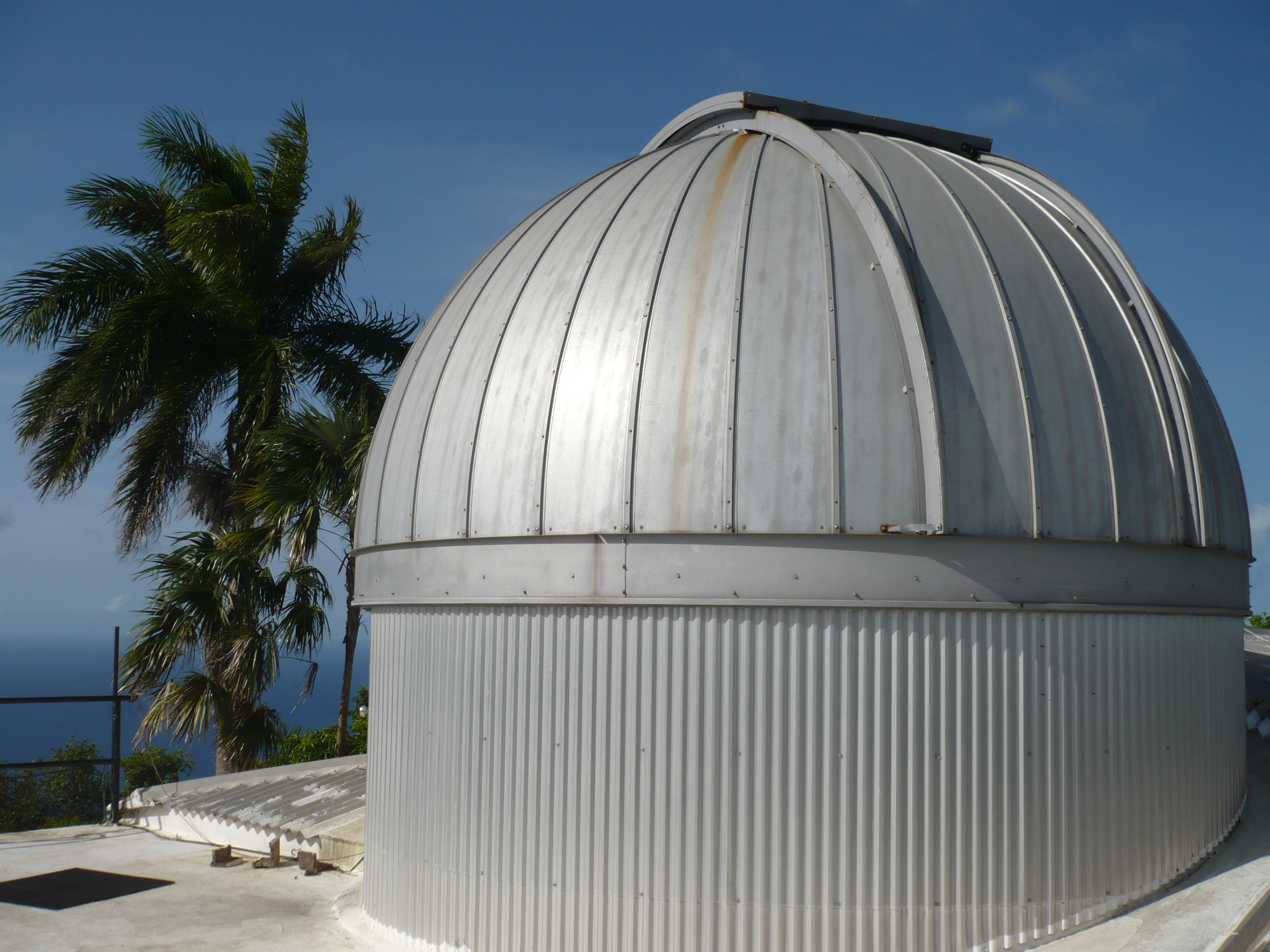
- Organization: University of the Virgin Islands
- Location: Saint Thomas, U.S. Virgin Islands
- Coordinates: 18°21′08.36″N 64°57′24.43″W
- Altitude: 1,380 feet (420 m)
- Website: Etelman Observatory web pages

Telescopes
- unnamed telescope: 0.5 m reflector
- St Thomas seismometer: seismometer
- Location within the U.S. Virgin Islands

Etelman Observatory is an astronomical and geophysical observatory located on the St Thomas island, United States Virgin Islands. It is owned and operated by the University of the Virgin Islands (UVI). The Etelman Observatory is the easternmost observatory of the U.S., and the only owning a robotic instrument in that part of the Caribbean Sea.

== History ==
The Observatory building and a first instrument were donated by Harry I Etelman in 1962 to the then College of Virgin Islands. Once promoted to University, UVI refurbished the building and upgraded the telescope to its current configuration in 2004. The instrument is since then used for scientific researches, public outreach and student projects.

== Instruments ==
The observatory operates one robotic 0.5m Cassegrain telescope. In addition, the observatory hosts a seismometer of the University of Puerto Rico.

== See also ==
- List of astronomical observatories
