= Hayti (disambiguation) =

Hayti is the archaic spelling of the name of the country Haiti, or an archaic name for the island of Hispaniola.

Hayti may also refer to the following places in the United States:

- Hayti, Durham, North Carolina
- Hayti Heights, Missouri
- Hayti, Missouri
  - Hayti High School
- Hayti, Pennsylvania
- Hayti, South Dakota

== See also ==
- Haiti (disambiguation)
