= LaVerne E. Ragster =

4th President of the University of the Virgin Islands
- In office 2002–2009
- Preceded by: Orville Edward Kean
- Succeeded by: David Hall

Personal details
- Born: 1951 (age 74–75) Saint Thomas, U.S. Virgin Islands
- Education: University of Miami; San Diego State University; University of California, San Diego

LaVerne Erina Ragster (born 1951) is a U.S. Virgin Island marine biologist and academic administrator who served as the fourth president of the University of the Virgin Islands from 2002 to 2009.

== Early life and education ==
Ragster was born in 1951 on Saint Thomas, U.S. Virgin Islands.

In 1969, she graduated from Charlotte Amalie High School. She earned a B.S. in biology and chemistry from the University of Miami in 1973. In 1975, she completed a M.S. in biology with an algal physiology concentration at San Diego State University. Ragster earned a Ph.D. in biology with a plant biochemistry concentration from the University of California, San Diego in 1980. Her dissertation was titled, Proteinases and the Control of Protein Degradation in the Leaves of Soybean (G̲l̲y̲c̲i̲n̲e̲ m̲a̲x̲ [L.] Merr).

== Career ==
Ragster began her career as an assistant professor at the College of the Virgin Islands (UVI). She also was a researcher for the Caribbean Research Institute. Her focus was on the conservation of marine resources. She was promoted to professor of marine biology and served as chair of the division of science and mathematics. She was an acting vice president for research and land grant affairs, vice president for research and public service, and senior vice president and provost of UVI. In 2002, she became the fourth president and first female president of UVI. She retired in 2009. In 2020, she co-authored a review article in the Health Affairs magazine, which discussed challenges and strategies to manage noncommunicable diseases in the Caribbean following natural disasters. In 2022, the administration and conference center building of UVI was named in her honor.

Ragster has served as president of the League of Women Voters of the Virgin Islands.
