= Erika J. Waters =

American editor, academic and critic

- Born: Alexandria, Virginia, United States
- Education: New York University; University of New Mexico
- Occupations: Editor, academic and critic
- Employer: University of the Virgin Islands
- Known for: Founding editor of The Caribbean Writer

Erika J. Waters is an American editor, academic and critic. She was the founding editor of the literary journal The Caribbean Writer in 1986 and has published critical works on Caribbean literature and on women's literature, notably on writers including Caryl Phillips, Una Marson and Jean Rhys.

== Life and career ==
She was born in Alexandria, Virginia, United States, when her mother was working at the Pentagon. Waters received her bachelor's and master's degrees in English from New York University and a Ph.D. in English from the University of New Mexico. She began teaching at the University of the Virgin Islands (St. Croix) in the early 1970s and is professor emeritus of English there, having been studying and writing on Caribbean literature for more than 30 years. Her essays, interviews, and reviews have been published in various academic journals, including The Chronicle of Higher Education, World Literature Today and The Women's Review of Books. Her research on women writers has been funded by the Tulsa Center for the Study of Women's Literature and the National Endowment for the Humanities. She taught part-time at the University of Southern Maine for a decade, and was a Fulbright Scholar in Finland.

== Selected bibliography ==
- Critical Issues in West Indian Literature, co-edited with Roberta Q. Knowles (Caribbean Books, 1984),
- New Writing from the Caribbean: Selections from The Caribbean Writer, ed. (Macmillan, 1994)
- Contemporary Drama of the Caribbean, co-edited with David Edgecombe (University of the Virgin Islands, 2000)
- From Kittery to Bar Harbor: Touring Coastal Maine (Arcadia Publishers, 2010)
- Discovering Old Florida: A Guide to Vintage South and Central Florida (Vintage Travel Guides, 2016)
