= Haiti I Am Sorry =

1988 calypso song by David Rudder

"Haiti I am Sorry"

Song by David Rudder

from the album Haiti
- Released: 1988
- Recorded: 1988
- Genre: Calypso, reggae, soca
- Length: 5:26
- Label: Sire, Lypsoland, London
- Songwriter(s): David Rudder
- Producer(s): Joe R. Brown, Charlie's Roots

"Haiti I am Sorry", or simply "Haiti", is a calypso song written and composed by David Rudder, and first recorded in 1988 for the album Haiti by David Rudder and Charlie's Roots. The song, which begins with the words: "Toussaint was a mighty man/ and to make matters worse he was black...", is a tribute to the glory and suffering of Haiti, and was described in the AllMusic review as "a remarkable ode to Caribbean unity".

== Personnel ==
Musicians

- David Rudder – lead vocals, harmonica, concept, writing, backing vocals
- Pelham Goddard – keyboards, conducting, drum programming, percussion
- Louis Junior Wharwood – guitar, backing vocals
- Tony Voisin – guitar
- B. J. Cameron – bass, backing vocals
- Emmanuel Ector – bass
- Carver Stevenson – saxophone
- Leopold Washington – saxophone
- Edward Elliott – trombone
- Haydn Robin – trumpet
- Mike Lindsay – trumpet
- Vonrick Maynard – drums
- Colin Stephen – percussion, congas
- Vernon Headley – percussion, congas
- Carl Jacobs – backing vocals

Production

- Joe R. Brown – producer, arrangements
- Charlie's Roots – executive producer
- Eric Michaud – engineering
- Ellis Chow Lin On – management
- Roy Boyke – artwork
- Atlas Advertising Agency – design

== Impact ==
The song has been credited with having in 1988 "brought impoverished Creole-speaking Haiti to the attention of the English-speaking Caribbean", and is frequently referenced in connection with ongoing political and environmental problems in Haiti. It was selected by Margaret Busby as one her eight musical choices on Desert Island Discs in June 2021.

== See also ==
- June 1988 Haitian coup d'état
- September 1988 Haitian coup d'état
