= Christine E. Lynn College of Nursing =

Nursing school of Florida Atlantic University

The Christine E. Lynn College of Nursing is located in Boca Raton, Florida, and is one of the ten academic colleges of Florida Atlantic University. The college offers nursing degrees at the undergraduate and graduate levels and has academic programs at the Boca Raton, Davie and Harbor Branch campuses.

== Overview ==
=== Background ===
Nursing at Florida Atlantic University traces its roots to 1979 when a Nursing Division was created under the then-College of Social Sciences. The College of Nursing was formally established as one of the academic colleges of Florida Atlantic University in 1990. In 2006, the college, and its primary building on the Boca Raton campus, were dedicated and took its current name as the Christine E. Lynn College of Nursing. In 2024, Cameron Duncan, PhD, DNP, APRN, FNP-C, PMHNP-BC, CNE, FAANP was named the Holli Rockwell Trubinsky Eminent Dean of the Christine E. Lynn College of Nursing. Dr. Safiya George, Dr. Marlaine Smith and Dr. Anne Boykin served as previous deans of the college.

The college offers a Bachelor of Science in Nursing (BSN), Master of Science in Nursing (MSN), Doctor of Nursing Practice (DNP), and a Doctor of Philosophy in Nursing (PhD). From 2002 to 2006, the College offered a Doctor of Nursing Science in lieu of its current Ph.D. program. At the undergraduate level, the College of Nursing is considered "limited access" with competitive admissions. The BSN's rigor is largely derived from students' lengthy clinical requirements as part of its academic program.

The college takes advantage of Boca Raton's urban setting and holds several teaching, research, and clinical partnerships with a number of area hospitals and clinics. The college maintains active research and clinical partnerships with the Charles E. Schmidt College of Medicine. It is also responsible for a few centers and institutes of its own.

=== Nursing building ===
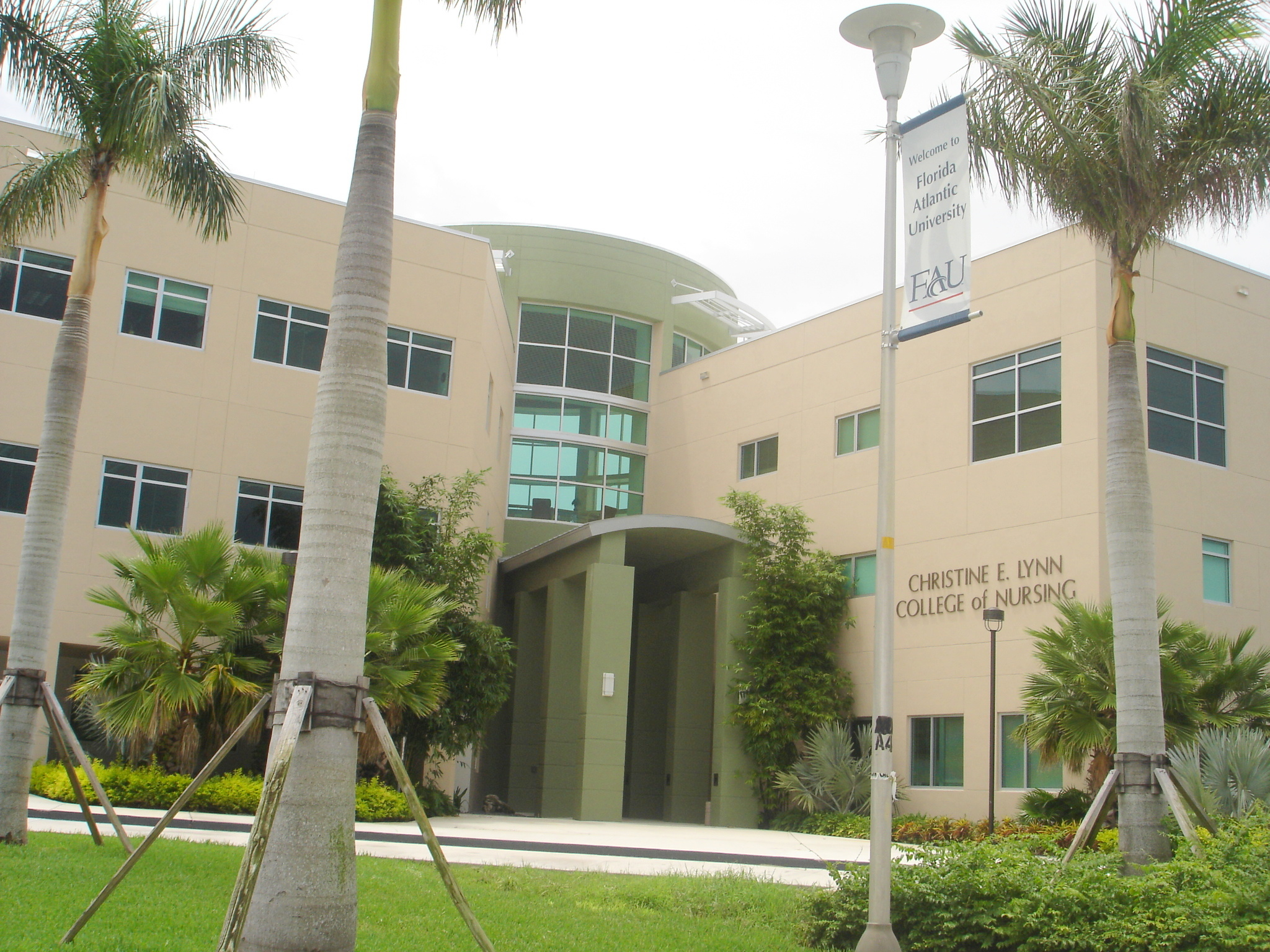
The front facade of the Nursing Building on Florida Atlantic University's Boca Raton campus.

A wish of Christine E. Lynn, the College's namesake, was to ensure that FAU's nursing program kept a particular focus on holistic nursing, referred to as "caring science" by the college. Because of this, the nursing building situated on the Boca Raton campus was designed to be a sustainable building surrounded by greenery. The building sits in front of a lake and features indoor-outside architecture with floor-to-ceiling windows, a large central rotunda, and a shaded garden area. At the time of its dedication, it was the only college of nursing in the United States to achieve LEED gold certification from the U.S. Green Building Council.

Keeping with the values of holistic nursing, the building was designed to infuse feng shui principles, a traditional Chinese healing practice, to promote positive energy. Placards and small monuments are installed around the College's building to promote "balance and harmony" and symbolize Feng Shui elemental principles like water and earth.

== Accreditation ==
As one of Florida Atlantic University's academic colleges, it is accredited by the Southern Association of Colleges and Schools Commission on Colleges. The College of Nursing is independently accredited by the Commission on Collegiate Nursing Education and its undergraduate BSN degree is an approved program by the Florida State Board of Nursing. The College of Nursing maintains one additional endorsement for all its degree programs by the American Holistic Nursing Credential Corporation.
