= Windward Islands Cricket Board of Control =

Ruling body for cricket in the Windward Islands

Windward Islands Cricket Board
- Sport: Cricket
- Jurisdiction: National
- Abbreviation: WICB
- Affiliation: Cricket West Indies
- Headquarters: Arnos Vale
- Location: St. Vincent and the Grenadines
- President: Dwain Gill
- Vice president: Clement Marcellin
- Secretary: Kezron Walters
- Men's coach: Kenroy Peters
- Women's coach: Samantha Lynch
- Sponsor: WINLOTT Inc.

Official website
- www.windwardscricket.com

The Windward Islands Cricket Board is the ruling body for cricket in the following West Indian islands: Grenada, Saint Lucia, Saint Vincent and the Grenadines and Dominica. Although Dominica is geographically part of the Leeward Islands, as it was part of the Windward Islands colony from 1940 until its independence, its cricket federation remains a part of the Windward Islands.

== History and formation ==
The Windward Islands Cricket Board was established in the 1980s to unify and coordinate cricket activities across the islands. Initially, cricket in the Windward Islands was managed independently by the individual islands, but as the sport grew in popularity, the need for a centralised body became apparent. The WICB was officially formed to streamline operations, facilitate inter-island competitions, and ensure representation in regional and international cricket.

== Structure and governance ==
The Windward Islands Cricket Board is composed of representatives from each of the member islands. Each island has its own cricket association that operates under the umbrella of the WICB. The Board's structure includes a president, vice-president, secretary, treasurer, and other executive members who are elected by the member associations. The WICB functions as a part of Cricket West Indies (CWI), which is the governing body for cricket in the West Indies.

The Secretariat of WICB is based in Grenada, while the franchise (Windwards Volcanoes) is based in St. Vincent and the Grenadines.

The most recent elections for the Board were held in May 2023, resulting in Mr. Dwain Gill being elected as president and Mr. Clement Marcellin as vice-president. Dr. Kishore Shallow had earlier relinquished the post after he was elected as the president of Cricket West Indies. Dr. Shallow had served as the WICB president from 2019 to 2023.

== Role and functions ==
The WICB is responsible for the administration of all cricket-related activities in the Windward Islands. This includes organising domestic competitions, developing cricket infrastructure, managing youth and development programs, and selecting teams for regional and international competitions. The Board also focuses on promoting the sport at the grassroots level to ensure a steady flow of talent for the future.

=== Domestic competitions ===
The Windward Islands have a domestic cricket scene with several competitions held annually. The most prominent of these is the Windward Islands Cricket Championship, which features teams from the member islands competing against each other. Additionally, the Board oversees club competitions and various age-group tournaments to nurture young talent.

=== Youth development ===
The WICB places a strong emphasis on youth development, running numerous programs to identify and train young cricketers. These initiatives include school cricket programs, talent scouting camps, and specialised coaching clinics. The Board also collaborates with schools and local communities to promote cricket as a means of personal development and social cohesion.

== Achievements and contributions ==
The region has produced several outstanding cricketers who have gone on to represent the West Indies at the international level. Notable players include Devon Smith, Daren Sammy, and Johnson Charles, who have all made substantial contributions to West Indies cricket.

== Windward Islands Constituent Associations ==
- Dominica Cricket Association
- Grenada Cricket Association
- St. Lucia National Cricket Association
- St. Vincent & the Grenadines Cricket Association

== Principals of Windward Islands Cricket Board ==
=== List of WICB Presidents ===
| Office holder | Tenure |
|---|---|
| Julian Hunte | |
| Lennox John | |
| Emmanual Nanthan | |
| Dr. Kishore Shallow | 2019-2023 |
| Dwain Gill | 2023-2025 |
| Clement Marcellin | since 2025 |

== See also ==
- Windward Islands cricket team
- List of Windward Islands first-class cricketers
- List of international cricketers from the Windward Islands
- Dominica national cricket team
- Grenada national cricket team
- Saint Vincent and the Grenadines national cricket team
- Saint Lucia national cricket team
- Cricket in the West Indies
