= Empire of Haiti =

Empire of Haiti may refer to:

- First Empire of Haiti, the regime under Jean-Jacques Dessalines (Jacques I) from 1804 to 1806
- Second Empire of Haiti, the regime under Faustin Soulouque (Faustin I) from 1849 to 1859

== See also ==
- Kingdom of Haiti, the regime under Henri Christophe (Henri I) from 1811 to 1820
