= West Indies cricket team =

Multi-national cricket team

West Indies
- Nickname: Windies
- Association: Cricket West Indies

Personnel
- Test captain: Roston Chase
- One Day captain: Shai Hope
- T20I captain: Shai Hope
- Coach: Daren Sammy

History
- Test status acquired: 1928 (98 years ago)

International Cricket Council
- ICC status: Full Member (1926)
- ICC region: Americas
ICC Rankings	Current	Best-ever
Test	8th	1st (1 January 1964)
ODI	10th	1st (1 June 1981)
T20I	7th	1st (10 January 2016)

Tests
- First Test: v. England at Lord's, London; 23–26 June 1928
- Last Test: v. Bangladesh at Sylhet International Cricket Stadium, Sylhet; 5–9 November 2026
Tests	Played	Won/Lost
Total	598	188/224 (185 draws, 1 tie)
This year	6	3/1 (2 draws)
- World Test Championship appearances: 3 (first in 2021)
- Best result: 8th place (2021, 2023, 2025)

One Day Internationals
- First ODI: v. England at Headingley, Leeds; 5 September 1973
- Last ODI: v. India at Maharaja Yadavindra Singh International Cricket Stadium, Mullanpur; 3 October 2026
ODIs	Played	Won/Lost
Total	907	432/431 (12 ties, 32 no results)
This year	10	3/6 (0 ties, 1 no result)
- World Cup appearances: 12 (first in 1975)
- Best result: Champions (1975, 1979)

T20 Internationals
- First T20I: v. New Zealand at Eden Park, Auckland; 16 February 2006
- Last T20I: v. India at M. Chinnaswamy Stadium, Bengaluru; 17 October 2026
T20Is	Played	Won/Lost
Total	260	111/133 (3 ties, 13 no results)
This year	21	11/9 (0 ties, 1 no result)
- T20 World Cup appearances: 8 (first in 2007)
- Best result: Champions (2012, 2016)
Test kit
ODI kit
T20I kit
- As of 9 November 2026

The West Indies cricket team, nicknamed the Windies, is a men's cricket team representing the West Indies—a group of mainly English-speaking countries and territories in the Caribbean region—and administered by Cricket West Indies (CWI). The players are selected from a chain of fifteen Caribbean nation-states and territories.

From the mid-late 1970s to the early 1990s, the West Indies team was the strongest in the world in both Test and One Day International (ODI) cricket. A number of cricketers who were considered among the best in the world have hailed from the West Indies: 21 have been inducted into the ICC Cricket Hall of Fame.

The West Indies have won the ICC Cricket World Cup twice (1975 and 1979), the ICC T20 World Cup twice (2012 and 2016), the ICC Champions Trophy in 2004, and the ICC Under 19 Cricket World Cup in 2016. They have also finished as runners-up in the Cricket World Cup (1983), the Under 19 Cricket World Cup (2004), and the ICC Champions Trophy (2006). The West Indies appeared in three consecutive World Cup finals (1975, 1979, and 1983) and were the first team to win back-to-back World Cups (1975 and 1979); both of these records have been surpassed only by Australia, who appeared in four consecutive World Cup Finals (1996, 1999, 2003, and 2007). The West Indies have hosted the 2007 Cricket World Cup the 2010 ICC World Twenty20 and co-hosted (with the United States) the 2024 ICC T20 World Cup.

As of April 2026, the West Indies cricket team is ranked eighth in Tests, tenth in ODIs, and seventh in Twenty20 Internationals (T20I) in the official ICC rankings.

== Member states and dependencies ==
The current team represents:

- **Sovereign states**
  - Antigua and Barbuda^{L}
  - Barbados
  - Dominica^{W}
  - Grenada^{W}
  - Guyana
  - Jamaica
  - Saint Kitts and Nevis (Note: Saint Kitts and Nevis are separately represented in the Leeward Islands Cricket Association.)
    - Nevis^{L}
    - Saint Kitts^{L}
  - Saint Lucia^{W}
  - Saint Vincent and the Grenadines^{W}
  - Trinidad and Tobago
- **Constituent country of the Kingdom of the Netherlands**
  - Sint Maarten^{L}
- **Overseas Territories of the United Kingdom**
  - Anguilla^{L}
  - British Virgin Islands^{L}
  - Montserrat^{L}
- **Territory of the United States**
  - U.S. Virgin Islands^{L}

Legends
L = Participant of the Leeward Islands team and member of the Leeward Islands Cricket Association
W = Participant of the Windward Islands team and member of the Windward Islands Cricket Board of Control

=== Affiliates in Cricket West Indies ===
Map of Cricket West Indies' members and affiliates. Full members are in bold, sub-members are in normal text, and affiliates in italics.

Cricket West Indies, the governing body of the team, consists of the six cricket associations of Barbados, Guyana, Jamaica, the Leeward Islands, Trinidad and Tobago, and the Windward Islands. The Leeward Islands Cricket Association consists of three cricket associations from two sovereign states (one from Antigua and Barbuda, and two from Saint Kitts and Nevis), three British Overseas Territories (Anguilla, the British Virgin Islands, and Montserrat), one U.S. territory (the U.S. Virgin Islands), and one Dutch constituent country (Sint Maarten). The Windward Islands Cricket Board of Control consists of associations of four sovereign states (Dominica, Grenada, Saint Lucia, and Saint Vincent and the Grenadines).

Two more British Overseas Territories in the region that have once been historical parts of the former West Indies Federation, the Cayman Islands and the Turks and Caicos Islands, have their own national teams currently.

National teams also exist for the various islands, which, as they are all separate countries, very much keep their local identities and support their local favourites. These national teams take part in the West Indian first-class competition, the Regional Four Day Competition (earlier known as the Busta Cup, Shell Shield, Carib Beer Cup, and various other names). It is also common for other international teams to play the island teams for warm-up games before they take on the combined West Indies team.

The combined population of these countries and territories is around 6 million people, comparable to fellow Full Members New Zealand and Ireland, and prominent Associate Member Scotland. Between 1928 and 2022 among the 385 men to play for West Indies, 67.8% hailed from either Barbados (98 players, 25.5%), Jamaica (83 players, 21.6%) or Trinidad and Tobago (83 players, 21.6%).

The member associations of Cricket West Indies are:

- Barbados Cricket Association (BCA)
- Guyana Cricket Board (GCB)
- Jamaica Cricket Association (JCA)
- Leeward Islands Cricket Association (LICA); itself composed of:
  - Anguilla Cricket Association
  - Antigua and Barbuda Cricket Association
  - British Virgin Islands Cricket Association
  - Montserrat Cricket Association
  - Nevis Cricket Association (for the island of Nevis alone)
  - Saint Kitts Cricket Association (for the island of Saint Kitts alone)
  - Sint Maarten Cricket Association
  - United States Virgin Islands Cricket Association
- Trinidad and Tobago Cricket Board (TTCB)
- Windward Islands Cricket Board of Control (WICBC); itself composed of:
  - Dominica Cricket Association
  - Grenada Cricket Association
  - Saint Lucia Cricket Association
  - Saint Vincent and the Grenadines Cricket Association

=== Potential future members ===
- The Bahamas
- Overseas collectivities of France
  - Saint Barthélemy^{L}
  - Saint Martin^{L}
- Overseas regions of the French Republic
  - Guadeloupe^{L}
  - Martinique^{W}
- Special municipalities of the Netherlands
  - Saba^{L}
  - Sint Eustatius^{L}

Legends
L = Affiliate of the Leeward Islands Cricket Association
W = Affiliate of the Windward Islands Cricket Board of Control

== History ==
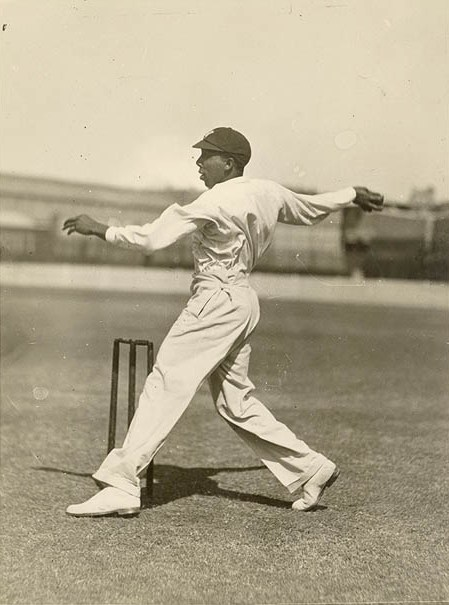
Learie Constantine, who played Test cricket in the 1920s and 1930s, was one of the first great West Indian players.

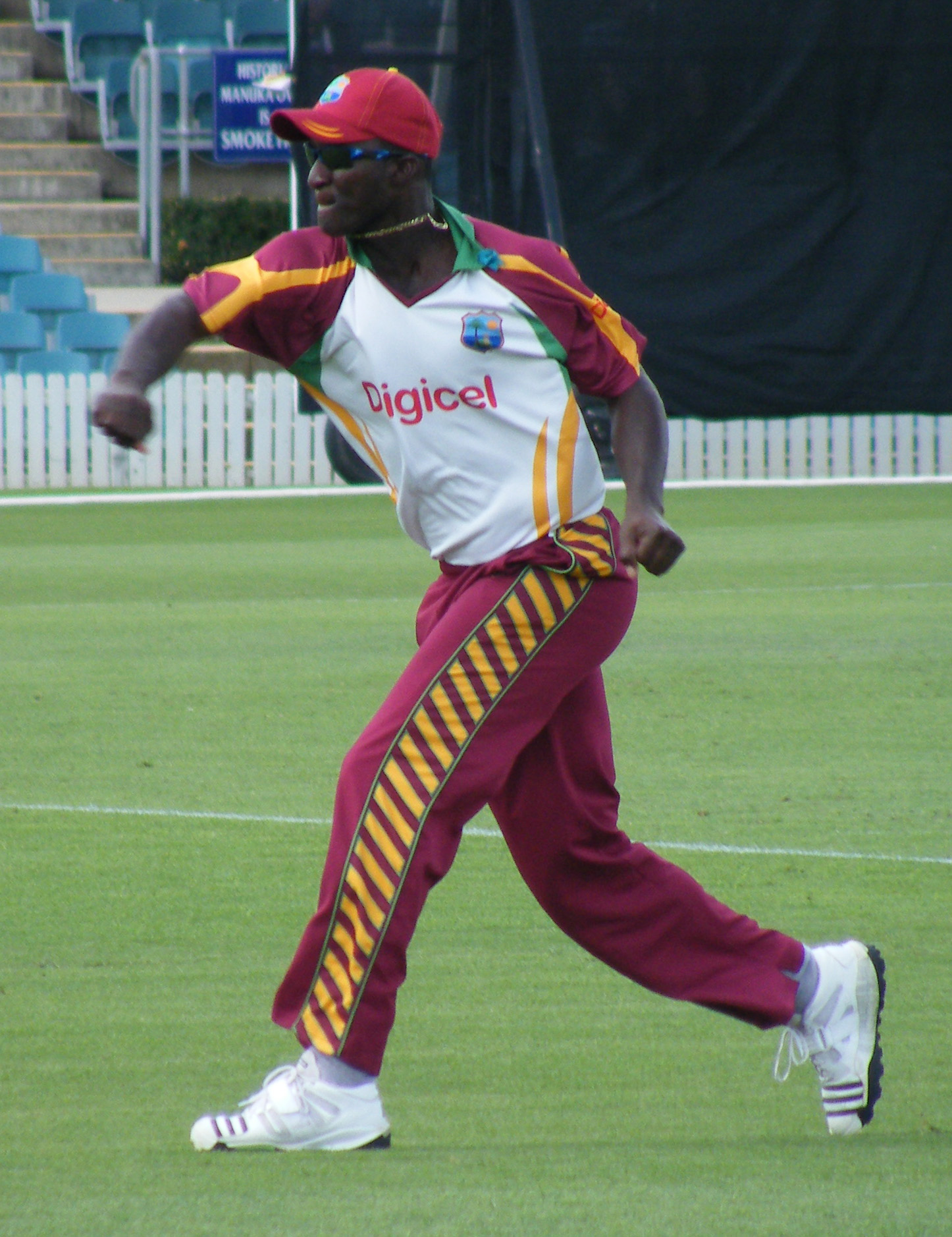
Daren Sammy. The West Indies have won three major tournament titles: The Champions Trophy once, and the World Twenty20 twice. Both World T20s were won with Sammy as captain, making him and Clive Lloyd who won the Cricket World Cup twice the only West Indian captains with multiple ICC tournament victories.

The history of the West Indies cricket team began in the 1890s, when the first representative teams were selected to play visiting English teams. The WICB joined the sport's international ruling body, the Imperial Cricket Conference, in 1926, and played their first official international match, granted Test status, in 1928, thus becoming the fourth Test 'nation'. In their early days in the 1930s, the team represented the British colonies that would later form the West Indies Federation plus British Guiana.

The last series the West Indies played before the outbreak of the Second World War was against England in 1939. There followed a hiatus that lasted until January 1948 when the MCC toured the West Indies. Of the West Indies players in that first match after the war only Gerry Gomez, George Headley, Jeffrey Stollmeyer, and Foffie Williams had previously played Test cricket. In 1948, leg spinner Wilfred Ferguson became the first West Indian bowler to take ten wickets in a Test, finishing with 11/229 in a match against England; later that same year Hines Johnson became the first West Indies fast bowler to achieve the feat, managing 10/96 against the same opponents.

The West Indies defeated England for the first time at Lord's on 29 June 1950. Ramadhin and Alf Valentine were the architects of the victory which inspired a calypso by Lord Beginner. Later on 16 August 1950, completed a 3–1 series win when they won at The Oval. Although blessed with some great players in their early days as a Test team, their successes remained sporadic until the 1960s when the team changed from a white-dominated to a black-dominated team under the successive captaincies of Frank Worrell and Gary Sobers.

The team won the inaugural World Cup in England in 1975, and successfully defended the title in 1979. By the late 1970s, the West Indies led by Clive Lloyd had a team recognised as unofficial world champions, a reputation they retained throughout the 1980s. During these glory years, the West Indies were noted for their four-man fast bowling attack, backed up by some of the best batsmen in the world. In 1976, fast bowler Michael Holding took 14/149 in the OvalTest against England, setting a record which still stands for best bowling figures in a Test by a West Indies bowler. The 1980s saw the team set a then-record streak of 11 consecutive Test victories in 1984 and inflict two 5–0 "blackwashes" on England.

Throughout the 1990s and 2000s, however, West Indian cricket declined, largely owing to the failure of the West Indian Cricket Board to move the game from an amateur pastime to a professional sport, coupled with the general economic decline in West Indian countries, and the team struggling to retain its past glory. Victory in the 2004 Champions Trophy and a runner-up showing in the 2006 Champions Trophy left some hopeful, but it was not until the inception of Twenty20 cricket that the West Indies began to regain a place among the cricketing elite and among cricket fans, as they developed ranks of players capable of taking over games with their power hitting, including Chris Gayle, Kieron Pollard, Marlon Samuels, Lendl Simmons, DJ Bravo, Andre Russell and Carlos Brathwaite. They beat Australia and then host Sri Lanka in the 2012 World Twenty20 to win their first ICC world championship since the 1979 World Cup and then bested England to win the 2016 World Twenty20, making them the first team to win the World Twenty20 twice. As an added bonus, the West Indies also became the first to win both the men's and women's World Twenty20 on the same day, as the women's team beat three-time defending champion Australia for their first ICC world title immediately beforehand. For the first time in the history of the tournament, the team did not qualify for the 2023 World Cup after losing to Scotland in the Super Six stage of the Qualifiers.

== Flag and anthem ==
Most cricketing nations use their own national flags for cricketing purposes. However, as the West Indies represent a number of independent states and dependencies, there is no natural choice of flag. CWI has, therefore, developed an insignia showing a palm tree and cricket stumps on a small sunny island (see the top of this article). The insignia, on a maroon background, makes up the West Indian flag. The background sometimes has a white stripe above a green stripe, which is separated by a maroon stripe, passing horizontally through the middle of the background. Prior to 1999, CWI(C) had used a similar insignia featuring a cabbage palm tree and an island, but there were no stumps and, instead of the sun, there was the constellation Orion. It was designed in 1923 by Sir Algernon Aspinall, then Secretary of the West India Committee. Around the same time in the 1920s the suggested motto for the West Indies team was "Nec curat Orion leones", which comes from a quote by Horace, meaning that Orion, as symbolical of the West Indies XI, does not worry about the lions [of English cricket].

For ICC tournaments, an adapted version of "Rally 'Round the West Indies" by David Rudder is used as the team's anthem.

== Venues ==
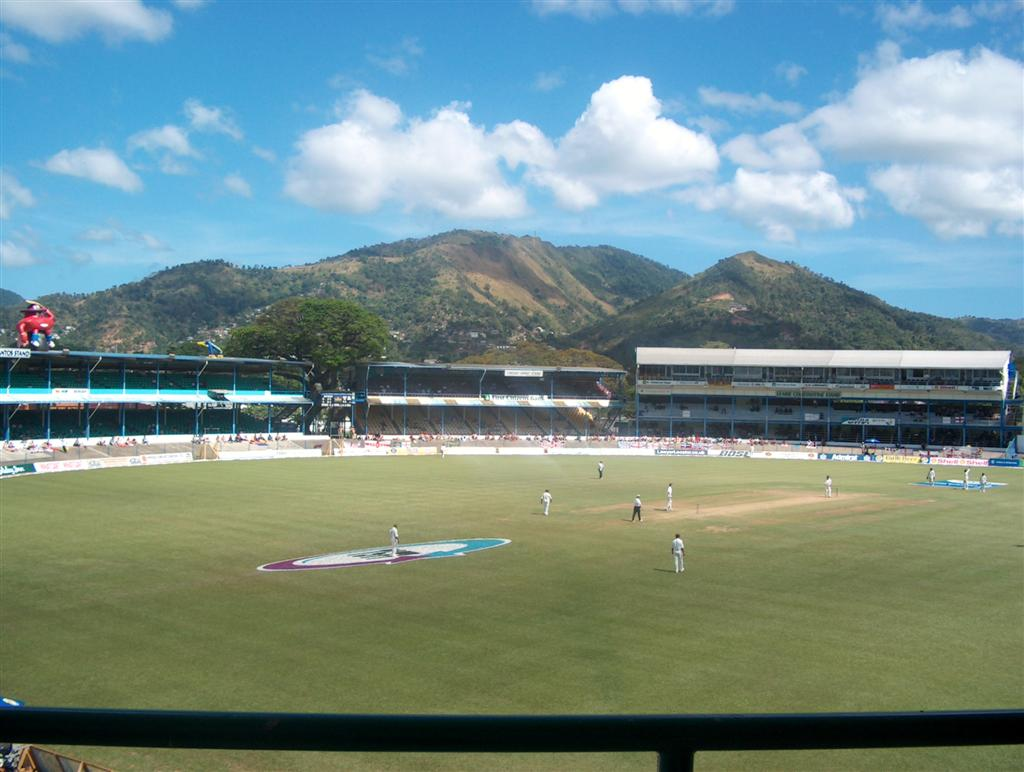
Queen's Park Oval, Trinidad

The following thirteen stadiums have been used for at least one Test match. The number of Tests played at each venue followed by the number of One Day Internationals and twenty20 internationals played at that venue is in brackets as of 2 April 2021:

- Queen's Park Oval – Port of Spain, Trinidad (64/73/6): The Queen's Park Oval has hosted more Test matches than any other ground in the Caribbean and first hosted a Test match in 1930. The ground is considered one of the most picturesque venues in the world of cricket, featuring the view Trinidad's Northern Range. It has a capacity of over 18,000.
- Kensington Oval – Bridgetown, Barbados (56/50/32):Kensington Oval hosted the region's first Test match in 1930 and is recognised as the 'Mecca' of West Indies cricket. Its capacity was increased from 15,000 to 28,000 for the 2007 World Cup and down to its current capacity of 11,000 post – World Cup. It has hosted two ICC world finals – the 2007 Cricket World Cup Final, which Australia won over Sri Lanka, and the 2010 World Twenty20 Final, which England won against Australia.
- Bourda – Georgetown, Guyana (30/11/0): Bourda first hosted a Test match in 1930. It was the only Test ground in South America (until the use of Providence), and the only one below sea level and with its own moat (to prevent the pitch from frequent flooding). It has a capacity of around 22,000. It is remembered for the Pitch Invasion during an April 1999, One Day International between Australia and the West Indies, with Australia needing 3 runs to tie and 4 to win off the last ball, a full scale pitch invasion, resulted in the match being deemed a tie, due to the stumps having been stolen before the West Indian team could effect a run out.
- Sabina Park – Kingston, Jamaica (56/43/14): Sabina Park first hosted a Test match in 1930. The Blue Mountains, which are famed for their coffee, form the backdrop. Sabina Park played host to Garry Sobers' then world-record 365 not out. In 1998, the Test against England was abandoned here on the opening day because the pitch was too dangerous. It has a capacity of 15,000.
- Antigua Recreation Ground – St John's, Antigua (22/11/0): Antigua Recreation Ground first hosted a Test in 1981. Three Test triple centuries have been scored on this ground: Chris Gayle's 317 in 2005, and Brian Lara's world record scores of 375 in 1994 and 400 not out in 2004. The historic stadium was removed from the roster of grounds hosting international matches in June 2006, to make way for the island's new cricket stadium, being constructed 3 miles outside the capital city expected to be completed in time for its hosting of matches for Cricket World Cup 2007. However, after the abandoned Test match between England and the West Indies in February 2009 at the new North Sound ground, Test cricket returned to the ARG.
- Arnos Vale – Arnos Vale, Kingstown, St Vincent (3/23/10): The Arnos Vale Ground a.k.a. The Playing Fields first hosted a Test in 1997.
- National Cricket Stadium – St George's, Grenada (5/25/8): Queen's Park, Grenada first hosted a Test in 2002.
- Daren Sammy Cricket Ground – Gros Islet, St Lucia (10/26/26): Originally the Beauséjour Cricket Ground, first hosted a Test in 2003. It has a capacity of 12,000. This was the first stadium in the Caribbean to host a day-night cricket match. The match was between the West Indies and Zimbabwe. New Zealand was scheduled to play a test in 2014 to mark the return to Test cricket after a break of 8 years. Following the West Indies' victory in the 2016 World Twenty20, the St. Lucian government renamed the venue after captain Sammy, a native St. Lucian, with another St. Lucian – Johnson Charles – having a stand named in his honor after also being part of the 2012 and 2016 championship squads.
- Warner Park Stadium – Basseterre, St Kitts (3/21/12): The Warner Park Sporting Complex hosted its first One Day International on 23 May 2006 and its first Test match on 22 June 2006. The stadium has a permanent capacity of 8,000, with provisions for temporary stands to enable the hosting figure to past 10,000.
- Providence Stadium – Georgetown, Guyana (3/27/16): The Providence Stadium hosted its first One Day International on 28 March 2007 for the 2007 Cricket World Cup and its first Test match on 22 March 2008. The stadium has a permanent capacity of 15,000, and is to host Test cricket instead of Bourda.
- Sir Vivian Richards Stadium – North Sound, Antigua (15/24/12): The Sir Viv Richards Stadium hosted its first One Day International on 27 March 2007 for the 2007 Cricket World Cup and its first Test match on 30 May 2008. The stadium has a permanent capacity of 10,000, and is to host Test cricket instead of the Antigua Recreation Ground.
- Windsor Park Stadium – Roseau, Dominica (6/4/4): Windsor Park is another home venue for the West Indian team. Construction first started on it in 2005, and it finally opened in October 2007, too late to serve as a venue for the 2007 Cricket World Cup. It hosts first-class cricket and hosted its first Test on 6 July 2011 against India, however it held its first One Day International on 26 July 2009. It has a seating capacity of 12,000.
- Brian Lara Stadium – San Fernando, Trinidad (1/4/11): Commissioned in 2004, construction was delayed and the stadium was completed in 2017. The first major cricket matches at the ground were several of the matches of the Caribbean Premier League in September 2017, including the final. The first first-class match was held in November 2017. The first test match was hosted on 25 July 2026. It has a capacity of 15,000.

Three further stadia have been used for One Day Internationals, or Twenty20 Internationals but not Test matches. The number of One Day Internationals and Twenty20 Internationals played at each venue is shown in the table below:

=== ODI and T20I grounds ===
The following three stadiums have been used for at least one international match other than Test matches.

Name	City	Country	Capacity	First match	Tests	ODIs	T20Is	Notes
Albion Sports Complex	Albion	Guyana	15,000	1977	—	5	0	
Mindoo Phillip Park	Castries	Saint Lucia		1978	—	2	0	
Coolidge Cricket Ground	Osbourn	Antigua and Barbuda	5,000	2017	—	—	4	

== Clothing ==
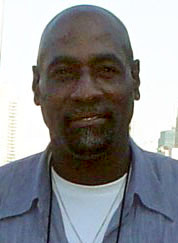
Viv Richards, who has a Test batting average of 50.23 from 121 matches, captained the West Indies from 1985–86 to 1991, a period throughout which the West Indies were the best Test match team in the world.

When playing one-day cricket, the West Indies cricket team wear a maroon-coloured shirt and trousers. The shirt also sports the logo of the West Indian Cricket Board and the name of their suppliers Macron. The one-day cap is maroon with the WICB logo on the left of the front, with two yellow stripes.

When playing T20I cricket, the team dons a yellow-coloured shirt with maroon-coloured sleeves, with two stripes of sky blue and yellow. The shirt also features the logo of the manufacturer along with the crest of the Cricket Board.

When playing first-class cricket, in addition to their cricket flannels West Indian fielders sometimes wear a maroon sunhat with a wide brim or a maroon baggy cap. The WICB logo is on the front of the hat. Helmets are coloured similarly. The sweater was edged with Maroon, green and grey. Gold was added to the stripes in the early 2000s. The design reverted to a simple maroon facing when the West Indies began wearing fleeces. In 2020 they again wore the traditional cable knit sweaters edged with Maroon and Green. When the team toured they wore maroon caps but in test matches in the Caribbean, it was customary for the team to wear dark blue caps until the late 1970s. The blazers awarded for home tests were dark blue with white and green facings. An example is displayed in the museum at Lord's. After 1977 home and away teams both wore maroon caps and the blazers were the same colours.

During World Series Cricket, coloured uniforms were adopted. The initial West Indies uniform was pink and was later changed to maroon to match their Test match caps. Grey was also added as a secondary colour. In some of their uniforms grey has been dominant over the traditional maroon. Some uniforms had green, yellow or white as accent colour.

Former uniform suppliers were Castore (2019–2023), BLK (2017–2019), Joma (2015–2017), Woodworm (2008–2015), Admiral (2000–2005), Asics (1999 World Cup), UK Sportsgear (1997–1998), ISC (1992–1996) and Adidas (1979–1991).

Former sponsors were Sandals (2018–2021), Digicel (2005–2018), KFC (2006–2009), Cable & Wireless (2000–2004), Carib Beer (1999–2001) and Kingfisher (1996–1999).

== West Indies women's cricket team ==
The West Indies women's cricket team have a much lower profile than the men's team. They played eleven Test matches between 1975–76 and 1979, winning once, losing three times, and drawing seven. Since then, they have only played one further Test match, a drawn game against Pakistan in 2003–04. They also have an infrequent record in One Day Internationals. A team from Trinidad and Tobago and a team from Jamaica played in the first women's World Cup in 1973, with both teams faring poorly, finishing fifth and sixth respectively out of a field of seven. The Windies united as a team to play their first ODI in 1979, but thereafter did not play until the 1993 World Cup. Although the team has never been a world leader, they finished runner-up in the 2013 World Cup and since have improved reasonably well. Their greatest success was achieving second place in the 2003 International Women's Cricket Council Trophy, a competition for the second tier of women's national cricket teams. Their overall record in one-dayers is to have played 177, won 80, lost 91 with one tie and 5 no results.

Because of the women's team's relatively low profile, there are few well-known names in the game. The most notable is probably Nadine George, a wicket-keeper/batsman, whose century in Karachi, Pakistan, in 2003-2004 is the only Test century scored by a West Indian woman. George is a prominent supporter of sport in the West Indies, and in particular, in her native St Lucia, and in 2005 was made an MBE by the Prince of Wales for services to sport.

2016 saw the West Indies women win their first ICC world championship – the 2016 Women's World Twenty20, after beating three-time defending champion Australia by eight wickets at Eden Gardens with members of the men's team in the crowd to support.

== Tournament history ==
A red box around the year indicates tournaments played within West Indies

Key
Champions
Runners-up
Semi-finals

=== ICC World Test Championship ===
ICC World Test Championship record
Year	League stage										Final Host	Final	Final Position
Year	Pos	Matches					Ded	PC	Pts	PCT	Final Host	Final	Final Position
Year	Pos	P	W	L	D	T	Ded	PC	Pts	PCT	Final Host	Final	Final Position
2019–21	8/9	13	3	8	2	0	6	720	194	26.9	Rose Bowl, England	DNQ	8th
2021–23	8/9	13	4	7	2	0	2	156	54	34.1	The Oval, England	DNQ	8th
2023–25	8/9	13	3	8	2	0	0	156	44	28.21	Lord's, England	DNQ	8th

=== Cricket World Cup ===
World Cup record
Hosts, Year	Round	Position	GP	W	L	T	NR
(England) 1975	Champions	1/8	5	5	0	0	0
(England) 1979	Champions	1/8	5	4	0	0	1
(England) (Wales) 1983	Runners-up	2/8	8	6	2	0	0
(India) (Pakistan) 1987	Round 1	5/8	6	3	3	0	0
(Australia) (New Zealand) 1992	Round 1	6/9	8	4	4	0	0
(India) (Pakistan) (Sri Lanka) 1996	Semi-finals	4/12	7	3	4	0	0
(England) (Wales) (Scotland) (Republic of Ireland) (Netherlands) 1999	Round 1	7/12	5	3	2	0	0
(South Africa) (Zimbabwe) (Kenya) 2003	Round 1	7/14	6	3	2	0	1
(Cricket West Indies) 2007	Super 8	6/16	10	5	5	0	0
(India) (Sri Lanka) (Bangladesh) 2011	Quarter-finals	8/14	7	3	4	0	0
(Australia) (New Zealand) 2015	Quarter-finals	8/14	7	3	4	0	0
(England) (Wales) 2019	Group stage	9/10	9	2	6	0	1
(India) 2023	Did not qualify						
(South Africa) (Zimbabwe) (Namibia) 2027	TBD						
(India) (Bangladesh) 2031	TBD						
Total	12/13	2 Titles	80	43	35	0	2

=== ICC Trophy/ICC Cricket World Cup Qualifier ===
World Cup Qualifier record
Year	Round	Position	GP	W	L	T	AB
(Zimbabwe) 2018	Runners-up	2/10	10	8	2	0	0
(Zimbabwe) 2023	Super 6	5/10	9	3	6	0	0
Total	-	0 title	19	11	8	0	0

- 1979–2014: Not eligible (top 8 in ODI rankings and Full Member of ICC)

=== ICC T20 World Cup ===
T20 World Cup record
Hosts, Year	Round	Position	GP	W	L	T	NR
(South Africa) 2007	Group stage	11/12	2	0	2	0	0
(England) 2009	Semi-finals	4/12	6	3	3	0	0
(Cricket West Indies) 2010	Super 8	6/12	5	3	2	0	0
(Sri Lanka) 2012	Champions	1/12	7	3	2	1	1
(Bangladesh) 2014	Semi-finals	3/16	5	3	2	0	0
(India) 2016	Champions	1/16	6	5	1	0	0
(United Arab Emirates) (Oman) 2021	Super 12	9/16	5	1	4	0	0
(Australia) 2022	Group stage	15/16	3	1	2	0	0
(Cricket West Indies) (United States) 2024	Super 8	5/20	7	5	2	0	0
(India) (Sri Lanka) 2026	Super 8	6/20	7	5	2	0	0
(Australia) (New Zealand) 2028	TBD						
(England) (Wales) (Scotland) (Republic of Ireland) 2030	TBD						
Total	9/9	2 titles	46	24	20	1	1

=== ICC Champions Trophy ===
Known as the 'ICC Knockout' in 1998 and 2000.

Champions Trophy record
Hosts, Year	Round	Position	GP	W	L	T	NR
(Bangladesh) 1998	Runners-up	2/9	3	2	1	0	0
(Kenya) 2000	Round 1	11/11	1	0	1	0	0
(Sri Lanka) 2002	Round 1	7/12	2	1	1	0	0
(England) 2004	Champions	1/12	4	4	0	0	0
(India) 2006	Runners-up	2/10	8	5	3	0	0
(South Africa) 2009	Round 1	8/8	3	0	3	0	0
(England) (Wales) 2013	Round 1	6/8	3	1	1	1	0
(England) (Wales) 2017	Did not qualify						
(Pakistan) (United Arab Emirates) 2025	Did not qualify						
(India) 2029	TBD						
Total	7/9	1 title	24	13	10	1	0

== Honours ==
=== ICC ===
- World Cup
  - Champions (2): 1975, 1979
  - Runners-up (1): 1983
- T20 World Cup
  - Champions (2): 2012, 2016
- Champions Trophy
  - Champions (1): 2004
  - Runners-up (2): 1998, 2006

== Statistics and records ==
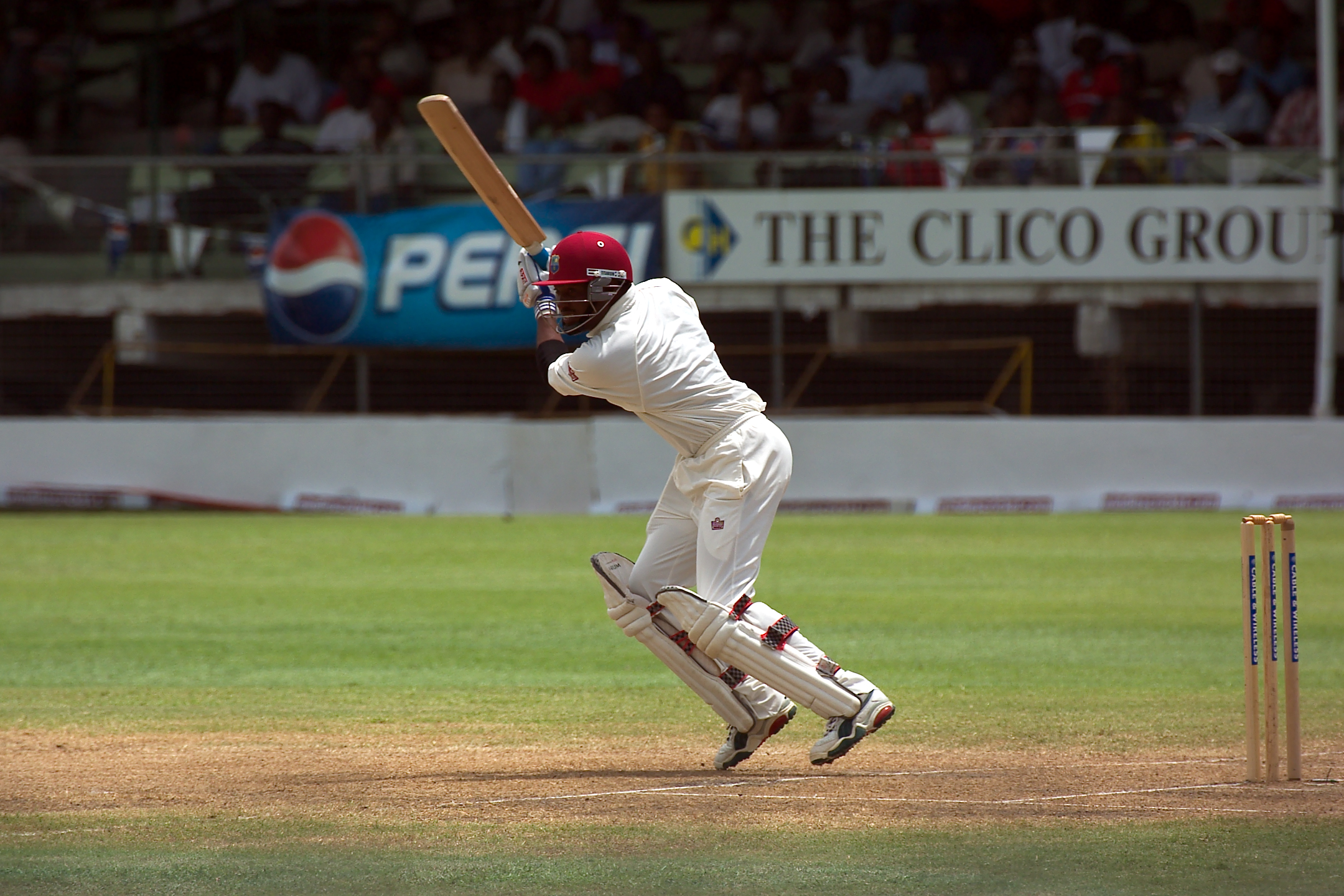
Brian Lara holds the world record for highest score in Test cricket (400 v. England in 2003–04)

Innings totals above 700

For: 790 for 3 declared against Pakistan in Kingston in 1957–58; 751 for 5 declared against England in St John's in 2003–04; 747 all out against South Africa in St John's in 2004–05; 749 for 9 declared against England in Bridgetown in 2008–2009
Against: 849 by England in Kingston in 1929–30; 758 for 8 declared by Australia in Kingston in 1954–55

Innings totals below 60

For: 27 against Australia in Kingston in 2025; 47 against England in Kingston in 2003–04; 51 against Australia in Port of Spain in 1998–99; 53 against Pakistan in Faisalabad in 1986–87; 54 against England at Lord's in 2000; 60 against Pakistan in Karachi in 2017–18 (60/9 (Surrender))
Against: 46 by England in Port of Spain in 1993–94; 51 by England in Kingston in 2008–09

Triple centuries scored for the Windies

400 not out by Brian Lara against England at St John's in 2003–04; 375 by Brian Lara against England at St John's in 1993–94; 365 not out by Garry Sobers against Pakistan at Kingston in 1957–58; 333 by Chris Gayle against Sri Lanka at Galle in 2010–11; 317 by Chris Gayle against South Africa at St John's in 2004–05; 302 by Lawrence Rowe against England at Bridgetown in 1973–74

Twelve or more wickets were taken for the Windies in a Test match

14 for the cost of 149 runs by Michael Holding against England at the Oval in 1976; 13 for 55 by Courtney Walsh against New Zealand in Wellington in 1994–95; Shanon Gabriel took 13 for 121 against Sri Lanka.:12 for 121 by Andy Roberts against India in Madras in 1974–

Hat-tricks

Wes Hall against Pakistan in 1959; Lance Gibbs against Australia in 1961; Courtney Walsh against Australia in 1988; and Jermaine Lawson against Australia in 2003

=== One-day matches ===
Hat-trick

An ODI hat-trick performance was made by Jerome Taylor on 19 October 2006 at Mumbai in an ICC Champions Trophy league match against Australia

At the ICC 2011 Cricket World Cup, Kemar Roach became the sixth bowler to claim a World Cup hat-trick against the Netherlands.

== Test captains ==
The following men have captained the West Indian cricket team in at least one Test match:

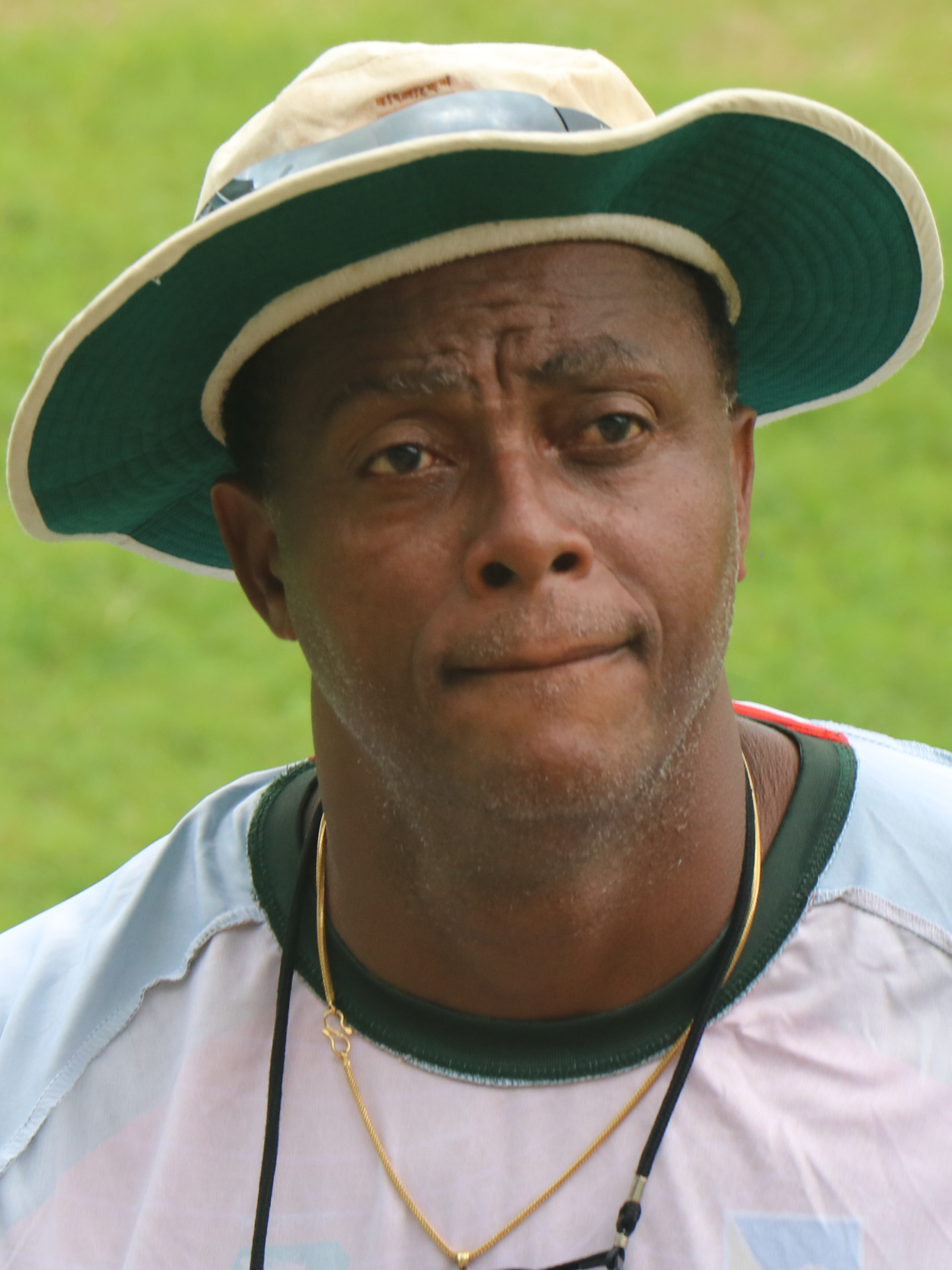
Courtney Walsh, who captained the West Indies between 1993–94 and 1997–98.

West Indian Test match captains
Number	Name	Period
1	Karl Nunes	1928–1929/30
2	Teddy Hoad	1929/30
3	Nelson Betancourt	1929/30
4	Maurice Fernandes	1929/30
5	Jackie Grant	1930/31–1934/35
6	Rolph Grant	1939
7	George Headley	1947/48
8	Gerry Gomez	1947/48
9	John Goddard	1947/48–1951/52, 1957
10	Jeffrey Stollmeyer	1951/52–1954/55
11	Denis Atkinson	1954/55–1955/56
12	Gerry Alexander	1957/58–1959/60
13	Frank Worrell	1960/61–1963
14	Garfield Sobers	1964/65–1971/72
15	Rohan Kanhai	1972/73–1973/74
16	Clive Lloyd	1974/75–1977/78, 1979/80–1984/85
17	Alvin Kallicharran	1977/78–1978/79
18	Deryck Murray	1979/80
19	Viv Richards	1980, 1983/84–1991
20	Gordon Greenidge	1987/88
21	Desmond Haynes	1989/90–1990/91
22	Richie Richardson	1991/92–1995
23	Courtney Walsh	1993/94–1997/98
24	Brian Lara	1996/97–1999/2000, 2002/03–2004, 2006–2007
25	Jimmy Adams	1999/2000–2000/01
26	Carl Hooper	2000/01–2002/03
27	Ridley Jacobs	2002/03
28	Shivnarine Chanderpaul	2004/05–2005/06
29	Ramnaresh Sarwan	2007
30	Daren Ganga	2007
31	Chris Gayle	2007–2010
32	Dwayne Bravo	2008
33	Floyd Reifer	2009 (due to contract dispute)
34	Darren Sammy	2010–2014
35	Denesh Ramdin	2014–2015
36	Jason Holder	2015–2021
37	Kraigg Brathwaite	2017, 2021–2025
38	Roston Chase	2025-

== Current squad ==
West Indies released the list of their 2025–2026 national contracts on 1 October 2025.

This is a list of every active player who is contracted to West Indies, has played for West Indies since 17 November 2024 or was named in the recent Test, ODI or T20I squads. Contracted players are listed in bold, uncapped players are listed in italics.

- Nicholas Pooran and Andre Russell played in T20Is during this period; however, both have retired from international cricket.

Last updated: 17 November 2025

- Forms – This refers to the forms they have played for West Indies in the past year, not over their whole West Indies career
- S/N – Shirt number

Name	Age	Batting style	Bowling style	Domestic team	Forms	S/N	Captain	Last Test	Last ODI	Last T20I
Batters
Kevlon Anderson	26	Right-handed	—N/a	Guyana	Test	73		(Australia) 2025	—N/a	—N/a
Jewel Andrew	19	Right-handed	—N/a	Leeward Islands	ODI, T20I	15		—N/a	(England) 2025	(Nepal) 2025
**Alick Athanaze**	27	Left-handed	Right-arm off break	Windward Islands	Test, ODI, T20I	28		(India) 2025	(New Zealand) 2025	(Cricket West Indies) 2025
Ackeem Auguste	23	Left-handed	—N/a	West Indies Academy	ODI, T20I			—N/a	(Bangladesh) 2025	(New Zealand) 2025
Kraigg Brathwaite	33	Right-handed	Right-arm off break	Barbados	Test	11		(Australia) 2025	(England) 2017	—N/a
John Campbell	31	Right-handed	Right-arm off break	Jamaica	Test, ODI	32		(India) 2025	(New Zealand) 2025	(India) 2019
**Keacy Carty**	29	Right-handed	Right-arm medium	Leeward Islands	Test, ODI, T20I	96		(Australia) 2025	(New Zealand) 2025	(Nepal) 2025
Tagenarine Chanderpaul	30	Left-handed	—N/a	Guyana	Test	30		(India) 2025	—N/a	—N/a
Johnson Charles	37	Right-handed	Left-arm orthodox	Windward Islands	T20I	25		—N/a	(Sri Lanka) 2023	(Pakistan) 2025
Shimron Hetmyer	29	Left-handed	—N/a	Guyana	ODI, T20I	2		(Afghanistan) 2019	(England) 2025	(Australia) 2025
**Brandon King**	31	Right-handed	—N/a	Jamaica	Test, ODI, T20I	53	ODI, T20I (VC)	(India) 2025	(Bangladesh) 2025	(New Zealand) 2025
Evin Lewis	34	Left-handed	—N/a	Trinidad and Tobago	ODI, T20I	17		—N/a	(Pakistan) 2025	(Ireland) 2025
Mikyle Louis	26	Right-handed	—N/a	Leeward Islands	Test	80		(Australia) 2025	—N/a	—N/a
**Rovman Powell**	33	Right-handed	Right-arm medium-fast	Jamaica	T20I	52		—N/a	(India) 2023	(New Zealand) 2025
**Sherfane Rutherford**	28	Left-handed	Right-arm fast-medium	Guyana	ODI, T20I	50		—N/a	(New Zealand) 2025	(New Zealand) 2025
All-rounders
Fabian Allen	31	Right-handed	Slow left-arm orthodox	Jamaica	T20I	97		—N/a	(India) 2022	(Nepal) 2025
Navin Bidaisee	23	Left-handed	Right-arm leg break	CCC	T20I			—N/a	—N/a	(Nepal) 2025
**Roston Chase**	34	Right-handed	Right-arm off break	Barbados	Test, ODI, T20I	10	Test (C)	(India) 2025	(New Zealand) 2025	(New Zealand) 2025
**Justin Greaves**	32	Right-handed	Right-arm medium	Leeward Islands	Test, ODI	66		(India) 2025	(New Zealand) 2025	(Bangladesh) 2024
Kavem Hodge	33	Right-handed	Slow left-arm orthodox	Windward Islands	Test	22		(Pakistan) 2025	(Australia) 2024	—N/a
Jason Holder	35	Right-handed	Right-arm medium-fast	Barbados	T20I	98		(South Africa) 2024	(Scotland) 2023	(New Zealand) 2025
Johann Layne	23	Right-handed	Right-arm medium-fast	Barbados	Test			(India) 2025	—N/a	—N/a
Kyle Mayers	34	Left-handed	Right-arm medium	Barbados	T20I	71		(South Africa) 2023	(India) 2023	(Nepal) 2025
Khary Pierre	35	Left-handed	Slow left-arm orthodox	Barbados	Test, ODI, T20I			(India) 2025	(Bangladesh) 2025	(Bangladesh) 2025
**Romario Shepherd**	31	Right-handed	Right-arm fast-medium	Guyana	ODI, T20I	16		—N/a	(New Zealand) 2025	(New Zealand) 2025
Shamar Springer	28	Right-handed	Right-arm fast-medium	Windward Islands	ODI, T20I	54		—N/a	(New Zealand) 2025	(New Zealand) 2025
Wicket-keepers
**Shai Hope**	33	Right-handed	—N/a	Barbados	Test, ODI, T20I	4	ODI, T20I (C)	(India) 2025	(New Zealand) 2025	(New Zealand) 2025
Amir Jangoo	29	Left-handed	—N/a	Trinidad and Tobago	Test, ODI, T20I	95		(Pakistan) 2025	(England) 2025	(New Zealand) 2025
Tevin Imlach	29	Right-handed	—N/a	Guyana	Test	31		(India) 2025	—N/a	—N/a
Pace bowlers
Jediah Blades	24	Right-handed	Left-arm medium	West Indies Academy	ODI, T20I	75		—N/a	(Pakistan) 2025	(Nepal) 2025
Matthew Forde	24	Right-handed	Right-arm medium	CCC	ODI, T20I	5		—N/a	(New Zealand) 2025	(New Zealand) 2025
**Alzarri Joseph**	29	Right-handed	Right-arm fast	Leeward Islands	Test, ODI, T20I	8		(Australia) 2025	(England) 2025	(Australia) 2025
**Shamar Joseph**	27	Left-handed	Right-arm fast	Guyana	Test, ODI, T20I	70		(Australia) 2025	(Pakistan) 2025	(Pakistan) 2025
Obed McCoy	29	Left-handed	Left-arm fast-medium	Windward Islands	T20I	61		—N/a	(India) 2018	(Nepal) 2025
Anderson Phillip	30	Right-handed	Right-arm fast-medium	Trinidad and Tobago	Test	48		(India) 2025	(Bangladesh) 2022	—N/a
Kemar Roach	38	Right-handed	Right-arm fast-medium	Barbados	Test	24		(Pakistan) 2025	(India) 2022	(Bangladesh) 2012
**Jayden Seales**	25	Left-handed	Right-arm fast-medium	Trinidad and Tobago	Test, ODI, T20I	33		(Australia) 2025	(New Zealand) 2025	(New Zealand) 2025
Ramon Simmonds	25	Left-handed	Left-arm fast-medium	Barbados	T20I			—N/a	—N/a	(Nepal) 2025
Spin bowlers
Karima Gore	28	Right-handed	Slow left-arm orthodox	Leeward Islands	T20I			—N/a	(United States) 2021	(Nepal) 2025
**Akeal Hosein**	33	Left-handed	Slow left-arm orthodox	Trinidad and Tobago	ODI, T20I	7		—N/a	(Bangladesh) 2025	(New Zealand) 2025
**Gudakesh Motie**	31	Left-handed	Slow left-arm orthodox	Guyana	Test, ODI, T20I	64		(Pakistan) 2025	(Bangladesh) 2025	(Bangladesh) 2025
Zishan Motara	20	Right-handed	Right-arm leg break	West Indies Academy	T20I			—N/a	—N/a	(Nepal) 2025
Kevin Sinclair	26	Right-handed	Right-arm off break	Guyana	Test	77		(Pakistan) 2025	(Sri Lanka) 2023	(South Africa) 2021
**Jomel Warrican**	34	Right-handed	Slow left-arm orthodox	Barbados	Test	65	Test (VC)	(Australia) 2025	—N/a	—N/a

== Coaching staff ==
Position	Name
Director of cricket	
Team manager	Rawl Lewis
Head coach	Daren Sammy
Batting coach	Floyd Reifer
Bowling coach	Ravi Rampaul
Fielding coach	Rayon Griffith

=== Coaching history ===
- 1992–1995: Rohan Kanhai
- 1995–1996: Andy Roberts
- 1996–1999: Malcolm Marshall
- 1999: Viv Richards (interim)
- 2000–2003: Roger Harper
- 2003–2004: Gus Logie
- 2004–2007: Bennett King
- 2007: David Moore (interim)
- 2007–2009: John Dyson
- 2009–2010: David Williams (interim)
- 2010–2014: Ottis Gibson
- 2015–2016: Phil Simmons
- 2017–2018: Stuart Law
- 2018: Nic Pothas (interim)
- 2019: Richard Pybus (interim)
- 2019: Floyd Reifer (interim)
- 2019–2022: Phil Simmons
- 2022: Andre Coley (interim)
- 2023–2025: Andre Coley
- 2025–present: Daren Sammy

== In popular culture ==
A British documentary film entitled Fire in Babylon was released in 2010. The documentary featured archival footage and interviews with several cricketers. The film was written and directed by Stevan Riley and was nominated for a British Independent Film Award for Best Documentary.

The documentary was about the domination of West Indies team of 1970s and 1980s, widely regarded as one of the greatest cricket teams in the history having not lost a Test series for fifteen years. It revolves around how the West Indies triumphed over its former colonial masters of England and racism in those days against black people.

Quite a number of calypsos mention the West Indian cricket. See List of calypso songs about cricket.

== See also ==
- Cricket in the West Indies
- Cricket West Indies
- Fire in Babylon
- History of the West Indian cricket team
- List of West Indies Test cricket records
- West Indies A cricket team
- West Indies High Performance Centre
- West Indies women's cricket team
- West Indies under-19 cricket team

Preceded by South Africa	Test match playing teams 23 June 1928	Succeeded by New Zealand
