= List of Guyanese representative cricketers =

The Guyana cricket team represents, originally, the British colony of British Guiana and later the independent state of Guyana.

Guyana's inaugural first-class match (as British Guiana) commenced on 29 August 1895 against Trinidad at Bourda in Georgetown, Guyana, its first List A limited overs match occurred on 13 April 1973 against Jamaica at Kensington Oval, Bridgetown, Barbados and its first Twenty20 match occurred on 21 July 2006 against Montserrat at Stanford Cricket Ground, Saint George Parish, Antigua and Barbuda.

While some of the cricketers listed below represented other teams the information included is solely for their career with Guyana, including as the Guyana Amazon Warriors.

== Key ==
- First – Year of debut
- Last – Year of latest game
- Apps – Number of matches played
- – Player has represented West Indies in a Test match, Limited Overs International or Twenty20 International match.
- - Player has represented an international side other than the West Indies in a Test match, Limited Overs International or Twenty20 International.

== Cricketers ==
Name	First	Last	Apps	First	Last	Apps	First	Last	Apps	Notes
Name	First-class			List A			Twenty20			Notes
Frederick Abraham	1904/05	1911/12	10	-	-	-	-	-	-	Son of Fred Abraham, Sr.
Vincent Adams	1968/69	1968/69	3	-	-	-	-	-	-	
Robert Adonis	1971/72	1971/72	1	-	-	-	-	-	-	
Umar Akmal	-	-	-	-	-	-	2015	2015	8	Brother of Kamran and Adnan Akmal.
Leslie Amsterdam	1958/59	1963/64	6	-	-	-	-	-	-	Father of Adrian Leslie Amsterdam.
Jerry Angus	1987/88	1989/90	7	1979/80	1987/88	3	-	-	-	
Merril Anthony	1929/30	1929/30	1	-	-	-	-	-	-	
Alistair Applethwaite	1933/34	1933/34	1	-	-	-	-	-	-	
Krishna Arjune	2002/03	2008/09	32	2004/05	2006/07	11	-	-	-	
Arthur Austin	1895/96	1895/96	2	-	-	-	-	-	-	Brother of Francis, Harold, John and Malcolm Austin.
Francis Austin	1904/05	1904/05	2	-	-	-	-	-	-	Brother of Arthur, Harold, John and Malcolm Austin.
Malcolm Austin	1903/04	1912/13	6	-	-	-	-	-	-	Brother of Arthur, Francis, Harold and John Austin.
Robin Bacchus	-	-	-	2013/14	2013/14	1	-	-	-	
Faoud Bacchus	1972/73	1982/83	37	1972/73	1982/83	16	-	-	-	
John Bahadur	1943/44	1943/44	1	-	-	-	-	-	-	
Len Baichan	1968/69	1979/80	34	1972/73	1979/80	6	-	-	-	
Saranga Baichu	1958/59	1958/59	2	-	-	-	-	-	-	
Bajou Baijnauth	1946/47	1956/57	6	-	-	-	-	-	-	Father of Amarnauth Ramcharitar.
Stephen Bamfield	1971/72	1986/87	8	1976/77	1986/87	4	-	-	-	
Keith Barker	1960/61	1963/64	2	-	-	-	-	-	-	Father of Keith Barker.
Christopher Barnwell	2008/09	2015/16	39	2008/09	2015/16	27	2007/08	2015	57	
Shemroy Barrington	2008/09	2010/11	7	-	-	-	-	-	-	
Neil Barry	1991/92	1995/96	7	1991/92	1995/96	12	-	-	-	
Sunny Basdeo	1953/54	1953/54	1	-	-	-	-	-	-	
Benjamin Bayley	1896/97	1911/12	4	-	-	-	-	-	-	
Harold Bayley	1901/02	1911/12	12	-	-	-	-	-	-	
Peter Bayley	1935/36	1950/51	17	-	-	-	-	-	-	
Kevin Bazil	2000	2000/01	2	-	-	-	-	-	-	
Ronsford Beaton	2010/11	2015/16	30	2012/13	2014/15	12	2012/13	2014/15	22	
Calvin Belgrave	1990/91	1992/93	6	1989/90	1993/94	9	-	-	-	
Rodney Belgrave	1905/06	1905/06	1	-	-	-	-	-	-	
Archibald Bell	1896/97	1896/97	-	-	-	-	-	-	-	
Rawle Benjamin	1953/54	1953/54	1	-	-	-	-	-	-	
Brandon Bess	2007/08	2011/12	28	2008/09	2008/09	2	-	-	-	
Lionel Birkett	1944/45	1944/45	1	-	-	-	-	-	-	Brother of Theodore Birkett.
Devendra Bishoo	2007/08	2014/15	46	2009/10	2014/15	22	2010/11	2015	31	
Aubrey Bishop	1952/53	1952/53	2	-	-	-	-	-	-	
John Blackman	1912/13	1921/22	2	-	-	-	-	-	-	
Philbert Blair	1967/68	1973/74	20	1972/73	1972/73	2	-	-	-	
Kevon Boodie	-	-	-	2015/16	2015/16	1	-	-	-	
Chester Bourne	1922/23	1922/23	1	-	-	-	-	-	-	Father of Charles Bourne.
Anthony Bramble	2012/13	2015/16	26	2010/11	2015/16	21	-	-	-	
John Branch	1921/22	1921/22	1	-	-	-	-	-	-	
William Brassington	1901/02	1901/02	3	-	-	-	-	-	-	
Henry Brebner	1903/04	1903/04	1	-	-	-	-	-	-	
William Brodie	1901/02	1901/02	1	-	-	-	-	-	-	
Barrington Browne	1987/88	1996/97	35	1986/87	1995/96	28	-	-	-	Brother of Robin Browne.
Robin Browne	1995/96	1995/96	2	1995/96	1995/96	6	-	-	-	Brother of Barrington Browne.
Snuffy Browne	1921/22	1937/38	21	-	-	-	-	-	-	Brother of Allan Browne.
Calvin Burnett	1987/88	1988/89	7	1987/88	1988/89	3	-	-	-	
Mark Burnett	1993/94	1993/94	1	1992/93	1993/94	4	-	-	-	
Tommie Burton	1901/02	1904/05	4	-	-	-	-	-	-	
Saul Busby	1899/1900	1899/1900	2	-	-	-	-	-	-	
Basil Butcher	1954/55	1970/71	35	1972/73	1972/73	1	-	-	-	
Clyde Butts	1980/81	1993/94	61	1983/84	1993/94	27	-	-	-	
Reginald Butts	1908/09	1910/11	2	-	-	-	-	-	-	
George Camacho	1943/44	1953/54	15	-	-	-	-	-	-	Son-in-law of George Learmond and father of Steve Camacho.
Steve Camacho	1964/65	1978/79	35	1972/73	1977/78	5	-	-	-	Grandson of George Learmond and son of George Camacho.
Keith Cameron	1973/74	1977/78	17	1975/76	1977/78	4	-	-	-	
Jules Chabrol	1901/02	1924/25	10	-	-	-	-	-	-	
Vernon Chabrol	1929/30	1929/30	1	-	-	-	-	-	-	Also represented British Guiana in association football, field hockey and athletics.
Shivnarine Chanderpaul	1991/92	2015/16	73	1991/92	2015/16	93	2008/08	2015	17	Father of Tagenarine Chanderpaul.
Tagenarine Chanderpaul	2012/13	2015/16	10	-	-	-	-	-	-	Son of Shivnarine Chanderpaul.
Rajindra Chandrika	2009/10	2015/16	31	2008/09	2014/15	11	-	-	-	
Garfield Charles	1982/83	1990/91	28	1982/83	1990/91	16	-	-	-	
Eric Chase	1951/52	1951/52	1	-	-	-	-	-	-	
Sewnarine Chattergoon	2000/01	2013/14	64	2001/02	2010/11	41	2007/08	2011/12	15	Brother of Hemnarine and Romaine Chattergoon.
Matthew Chinsammy	1996/97	1996/97	1	-	-	-	-	-	-	Brother of Stanley Chinsammy and uncle of Jonathan Foo.
Derwin Christian	2005/06	2012/13	51	2004/05	2012/13	35	2007/08	2012/13	27	
Cyril Christiani	1931/32	1937/38	10	-	-	-	-	-	-	Brother of Ernest, Harry and Robert Christiani.
Ernest Christiani	1935/36	1946/47	5	-	-	-	-	-	-	Brother of Cyril, Harry and Robert Christiani.
Harry Christiani	1947/48	1947/48	1	-	-	-	-	-	-	Brother of Cyril, Ernest and Robert Christiani.
Robert Christiani	1938	1953/54	26	-	-	-	-	-	-	Brother of Cyril, Ernest and Harry Christiani.
Alexander Clarke	1896/97	1901/02	8	-	-	-	-	-	-	
Rex Collymore	1963/64	1975/76	31	1975/76	1975/76	1	-	-	-	
Lloyd Cornelius	1966/67	1970/71	15	-	-	-	-	-	-	
Troy Cornelius	2004/05	2004/05	2	-	-	1	-	-	-	
Colwin Cort	1990/91	1991/92	2	1991/92	1993/94	2	-	-	-	
Newman Cox	1895/96	1895/96	2	-	-	-	-	-	-	
Esuan Crandon	2000/01	2010/11	38	2003/04	2010/11	27	2006	2010/11	18	Brother of Royston Crandon.
Royston Crandon	2006/07	2011/12	24	2006/07	2015/16	35	2007/08	2012/13	26	Brother of Esuan Crandon.
Paul Cressall	1911/12	1922/23	4	-	-	-	-	-	-	
Henry Croal	1910/11	1922/23	7	-	-	-	-	-	-	
Colin Croft	1971/72	1981/82	20	1975/76	1981/82	9	-	-	-	
Joshua Cromwell	1907/08	1912/13	2	-	-	-	-	-	-	
Lennox Cush	1995/96	2004/05	38	1998/99	2010/11	28	2006	2010/11	14	
Damodar Daesrath	2003/04	2004/05	15	2004/05	2004/05	7	-	-	-	Represented Canada in One Day Internationals and T20.
Arthur Dare	1895/96	1899/1900	8	-	-	-	-	-	-	Son of John Dare and father of John Dare.
John Dare	1924/25	1937/38	11	-	-	-	-	-	-	Grandson of John Dare, son of Arthur Dare and uncle of Bruce Pairaudeau.
Kevin Darlington	1994/95	2001/02	30	1995/96	2000/01	22	-	-	-	
Frank de Caires	1928/29	1937/38	11	-	-	-	-	-	-	
Bill de Freitas	1943/44	1943/44	1	-	-	-	-	-	-	
Celso de Freitas	1933/34	1938/39	13	-	-	-	-	-	-	
Nicholas de Groot	1994/95	2000/01	32	1996/97	1999/2000	9	-	-	-	Represented Canada in LOIs.
Marchant de Lange	-	-	-	-	-	-	2015	2015	10	
Narsingh Deonarine	1999/2000	2014/15	76	1999/2000	2013/14	54	2006	2013	26	
Sudesh Dhaniram	1986/87	1994/95	37	1986/87	1996/97	35	-	-	-	Brother of Sunil Dhaniram.
Sunil Dhaniram	1992/93	1994/95	12	-	-	-	-	-	-	Represented Canada in ODIs and International Twenty20s.
Vernon Dias	1922/23	1925/26	5	-	-	-	-	-	-	
Tillakaratne Dilshan	-	-	-	-	-	-	2013	2015	6	Brother of Tillakaratne Sampath.
Rudolph Doodnauth	1972/73	1972/73	1	-	-	-	-	-	-	
Colin d'Ornellas	1909/10	1911/12	3	-	-	-	-	-	-	
Travis Dowlin	1996/97	2009/10	72	1999/2000	2011/12	38	2006/07	2010/11	19	
Stanley Downer	1903/04	1908/09	2	-	-	-	-	-	-	
Devon Drayton	1908/09	1921/22	4	-	-	-	-	-	-	
Austin Dummett	1943/44	1943/44	2	-	-	-	-	-	-	
Hilton Drummett	1938	1938	1	-	-	-	-	-	-	
Vibert Durjan	1968/69	1968/69	5	-	-	-	-	-	-	
Hugh Dyer	1951/52	1953/54	3	-	-	-	-	-	-	
Wilfred Edun	1954/55	1959/60	5	-	-	-	-	-	-	
Kevin Edwards	1985/86	1985/86	2	1985/86	1985/86	1	-	-	-	
Joseph Elvis	1944/45	1945/46	2	-	-	-	-	-	-	
Winston English	1966/67	1969/70	10	-	-	-	-	-	-	
Ernest Estwick	1923/24	1925/26	3	-	-	-	-	-	-	
Romain Etwaroo	1972/73	1977/78	13	1975/76	1976/77	2	-	-	-	Brother of Reginald and Tyrone Etwaroo and nephew of Rohan Kanhai.
Tyrone Etwaroo	1979/80	1983/84	15	1979/80	1983/84	10	-	-	-	Brother of Reginald and Romain Etwaroo and nephew of Rohan Kanhai.
Hubern Evans	1976/77	1977/78	2	-	-	-	-	-	-	
John Farnum	1903/04	1909/10	2	-	-	-	-	-	-	
Leslie Fernandes	1960/61	1960/61	1	-	-	-	-	-	-	Son of Maurice Fernandes.
Maurice Fernandes	1922/23	1931/32	13	-	-	-	-	-	-	Father of Leslie Fernandes.
Dion Ferrier	-	-	-	2006/07	2008/09	9	2006	2006	4	
Jonathan Foo	-	-	-	2010/11	2011/12	3	2010/11	2012/13	17	
Patrick Forde	1924/25	1924/25	1	-	-	-	-	-	-	
Raydon Franklin	1953/54	1953/54	1	-	-	-	-	-	-	
Edward Fraser	1903/04	1910/11	4	-	-	-	-	-	-	
Harold Fraser	1937/38	1938/39	6	-	-	-	-	-	-	
Linden Fraser	1983/84	1983/84	1	-	-	-	-	-	-	
Roy Fredericks	1963/64	1982/83	47	1976/77	1982/83	6	-	-	-	Wisden Cricketer of the Year 1974.
Assad Fudadin	2004/05	2015/16	64	2005/06	2015/16	35	2010/11	2015	9	
George Gall (Note: Gall played in six first-class matches from 1896/97 to 1911/12. No biographical details are known.)	1896/97	1911/12	6	-	-	-	-	-	-	
Joseph Gamble (Note: Gamble played in a single first-class matches in 1911/12. No biographical details are known.)	1911/12	1911/12	1	-	-	-	-	-	-	
Suresh Ganouri	1977/78	1983/84	2	1983/84	1983/84	2	-	-	-	
Hemraj Garbarran	2000	2000	1	-	-	-	-	-	-	
George Garnett	1895/96	1896/97	4	-	-	-	-	-	-	
Patrick Garraway	1905/06	1907/08	2	-	-	-	-	-	-	
Trevon Garraway	2004/05	2008/09	12	2008/09	2008/09	1	-	-	-	
Berkeley Gaskin	1928/29	1953/54	38	-	-	-	-	-	-	
Clement Gaskin	1905/06	1905/06	1	-	-	-	-	-	-	
Herbert Gaskin	1901/02	1901/02	3	-	-	-	-	-	-	
Arnold Gibbons	1952/53	1953/54	2	-	-	-	-	-	-	
Glendon Gibbs	1949/50	1962/63	27	-	-	-	-	-	-	
Lance Gibbs	1953/54	1974/75	39	-	-	-	-	-	-	Wisden Cricketer of the Year 1972. Cousin of Clive Lloyd.
Jackson Gill	1901/02	1904/05	3	-	-	-	-	-	-	
Keith Glasgow	1970/71	1973/74	8	1972/73	1972/73	2	-	-	-	Brother of Ovid Glasgow.
Ovid Glasgow	1966/67	1966/67	3	-	-	-	-	-	-	Brother of Keith Glasgow.
Worrell Goddard	1925/26	1926/27	5	-	-	-	-	-	-	Brother of John Goddard.
Andrew Gomes	1912/13	1923/24	3	-	-	-	-	-	-	
Rupert Gomes	1971/72	1980/81	11	1972/73	1980/81	10	-	-	-	
Andrew Gonsalves	1999/2000	2001/02	2	1997/98	2001/02	20	-	-	-	
Courtenay Gonsalves	-	-	-	1980/81	1980/81	2	-	-	-	
Walter Goodman	1895/96	1901/02	8	-	-	-	-	-	-	Brother of Clifford, Gerald and Percy Goodman.
Sen Gopaul	1975/76	1978/79	7	-	-	-	-	-	-	
Jeremy Gordon	2006/07	2007/08	3	-	-	-	-	-	-	Represented Canada in ODIs and T20Is.
Carl Gouveia	1946/47	1946/47	1	-	-	-	-	-	-	
Padwick Green	1921/22	1921/22	1	-	-	-	-	-	-	Brother of Maurice Green.
Maurice Green	1923/24	1937/38	16	-	-	-	-	-	-	Brother of Padwick Green.
Mark Grenville	1985/86	1985/86	1	-	-	-	-	-	-	
Reon Griffith	2000	2006/07	16	2002/03	2005/06	22	-	-	-	
Trevon Griffith	2011/12	2014/15	7	2011/12	2014/15	17	2011/12	2015	14	
Walter Griffith	1938	1947/48	6	-	-	-	-	-	-	
Martin Guptill	-	-	-	-	-	-	2013	2014	18	
Mohammad Hafeez	-	-	-	-	-	-	2013	2014	18	
Nezam Hafiz	1988/89	1990/91	5	1988/89	1988/89	2	-	-	-	
Azib Ally-Haniff	1998/99	2001/02	11	-	-	-	-	-	-	
Azeemul Haniff	1996/97	2006/07	47	1999/2000	2006/07	9	-	-	-	Brother of Zaheer Haniff.
Zaheer Haniff	1994/95	1999/2000	11	1994/95	1999/2000	2	-	-	-	Brother of Azeemul Haniff.
Victor Harnanan	1961/62	1963/64	2	-	-	-	-	-	-	
Imtiaz Harper	1987/88	1988/89	5	1987/88	1990/91	5	-	-	-	
Lloyd Harper	1976/77	1977/78	2	1976/77	1976/77	1	-	-	-	
Mark Harper	1975/66	1990/91	30	1977/78	1990/91	13	-	-	-	Brother of Roger Harper.
Roger Harper	1979/80	1995/96	57	1979/80	1996/97	48	-	-	-	Brother of Mark Harper.
Frederick Hartman	1976/77	1976/77	1	1975/76	1976/77	2	-	-	-	
Chanderpaul Hemraj	2011/12	2013/14	5	-	-	-	-	-	-	
Richard Hector	1953/54	1954/55	2	-	-	-	-	-	-	
Isaac Henry	1921/22	1922/23	3	-	-	-	-	-	-	
Colin Heron	1961/62	1961/62	1	-	-	-	-	-	-	
Shimron Hetmyer	2013/14	2015/16	6	-	-	-	-	-	-	
Dennis Hewitt	1979/80	1984/85	4	1979/80	1984/85	4	-	-	-	
Delbert Hicks	2008/09	2008/09	1	2009/10	209/10	4	-	-	-	
David Hill	1937/38	1952/53	10	-	-	-	-	-	-	
Simon Hinds	1909/10	1912/13	5	-	-	-	-	-	-	
Brad Hodge	-	-	-	-	-	-	2015	2015	10	
Carl Hooper	1984/85	2002/03	45	1984/85	2002/03	54	-	-	-	
Ronald Hunte	1908/09	1929/30	12	-	-	-	-	-	-	
Clarence Hunter	1912/13	1922/23	3	-	-	-	-	-	-	
Rajiv Ivan	-	-	-	2012/13	2012/13	2	-	-	-	
Andrew Jackman	1983/84	1990/91	28	1983/84	1990/91	14	-	-	-	
Leroy Jackman	1951/52	1951/52	2	-	-	-	-	-	-	
Sydney Jackman	1965/66	1965/66	4	-	-	-	-	-	-	
Steven Jacobs	2005/06	2015/16	18	2008/09	2015/16	26	2010/11	2013/14	22	
Imran Jafferally	2004/05	2006/07	5	-	-	-	-	-	-	
William Jeffrey	1969/70	1977/78	6	-	-	-	-	-	-	
Alvin Jemmott	1925/26	1925/26	1	-	-	-	-	-	-	
Vibart Johashen	1976/77	1978/79	3	1977/78	1977/78	1	-	-	-	
Leon Johnson	2003/04	2015/16	53	2007/08	2015/16	24	2011/12	2014	14	
Raun Johnson	2013/14	2013/14	2	-	-	-	-	-	-	
Charles Jones	1925/26	1938/39	19	-	-	-	-	-	-	
Ian Jordan	1947/48	1957/58	5	-	-	-	-	-	-	
Norman Jordan	1908/09	1909/10	2	-	-	-	-	-	-	
Keon Joseph	2009/10	2015/16	12	2010/11	2010/11	2	-	-	-	
Linden Joseph	1986/87	1994/95	24	1986/87	1994/95	19	-	-	-	
Ray Joseph	1979/80	1985/86	20	1979/80	1985/86	10	-	-	-	
Alvin Kallicharran	1966/67	1980/81	37	1972/73	1977/78	4	-	-	-	Wisden Cricketer of the Year 1983. Brother of Derek Kallicharran.
Derek Kallicharran	1978/79	1985/86	31	1982/83	1985/86	5	-	-	-	
Rohan Kanhai	1954/55	1973/74	30	1972/73	1972/73	2	-	-	-	Wisden Cricketer of the Year 1964.
Eion Katchay	2000	2000/01	4	-	-	-	-	-	-	
Amir Khan	2010/11	2012/13	3	-	-	-	-	-	-	
Ganim Khan	1952/53	1952/53	1	-	-	-	-	-	-	
Imran Khan	-	-	-	2006	2006	4	-	-	-	
Clement King	1895/96	1904/05	12	-	-	-	-	-	-	
Reon King	1995/96	2006/07	46	1994/95	2007/08	51	-	-	-	
Clayton Lambert	1983/84	1998/99	61	1984/85	1998/99	39	-	-	-	Also played ODIs for United States.
Leslaine Lambert	1978/79	1985/86	11	1978/79	1985/86	6	-	-	-	
Stephen Latcha	-	-	-	2011/12	2011/12	3	-	-	-	
Oliver Layne	1909/10	1912/13	4	-	-	-	-	-	-	
Angus Learmond	1933/34	1936/37	4	-	-	-	-	-	-	Son of George Learmond.
George Learmond	1896/97	1899/1900	7	-	-	-	-	-	-	Father of Angus Learmond, father-in-law of George Camacho and grandfather of Steve Camacho.
Pat Legall	1954/55	1962/63	11	-	-	-	-	-	-	
Clive Lloyd	1963/64	1982/83	42	1972/73	1982/83	8	-	-	-	Wisden Cricketer of the Year 1971. Cousin of Lance Gibbs.
Geoffrey Lord	1944/45	1944/45	1	-	-	-	-	-	-	
Roderick Lovell	1997/98	1997/98	2	1995/96	1995/96	3	-	-	-	
Andrew Lyght	1976/77	1987/88	26	1979/80	1985/86	13	-	-	-	
Monte Lynch	1982/83	1982/83	5	1982/83	1982/83	3	-	-	-	Played ODIs for England.
William McCowan	1911/12	1911/12	1	-	-	-	-	-	-	
Neil McGarrell	1995/96	2005/06	71	1995/96	2007/08	63	-	-	-	
Jeremy McKenzie	1928/29	1929/30	4	-	-	-	-	-	-	
Nolan McKenzie	1988/89	1995/96	17	1991/92	1995/96	14	-	-	-	
Ulric McKenzie	1938/39	1944/45	6	-	-	-	-	-	-	
Devon McLean	1924/25	1926/27	3	-	-	-	-	-	-	
Leonard McRae	1970/71	1972/73	6	-	-	-	-	-	-	
Cliff McWatt	1943/44	1956/57	24	-	-	-	-	-	-	
Ivan Madray	1954/55	1957/58	4	-	-	-	-	-	-	
Lasith Malinga	-	-	-	-	-	-	2013	2013	2	
Naresh Manbodhe	1994/95	1995/96	3	-	-	-	-	-	-	
David Martins	1953/54	1953/54	1	-	-	-	-	-	-	
Ron Matthews	2000/01	2000/01	6	-	-	-	-	-	-	
Sydney Matthews	1969/70	1987/88	34	1975/76	1978/99	6	-	-	-	
Vincent Mayers	1964/65	1968/69	6	-	-	-	-	-	-	
Neville Maynard	1952/53	1952/53	1	-	-	-	-	-	-	
Ivor Mendonca	1958/59	1961/62	8	-	-	-	-	-	-	
Carlyle Miller	1960/61	1964/65	9	-	-	-	-	-	-	
Bahadur Mohabir	1961/62	1961/62	2	-	-	-	-	-	-	
Edwin Mohamed	1957/58	1966/67	12	-	-	-	-	-	-	Father of Timur Mohamed.
Timur Mohamed	1975/76	1986/87	36	1978/79	1986/87	17	-	-	-	Son of Edwin Mohamed.
Zaheer Mohamed	2003/04	2013/14	18	2007/08	2012/13	5	-	-	-	
Ricardo Mohammed	1998/99	1998/99	1	1999/2000	2000/01	4	-	-	-	
Sheik Mohammed	1987/88	1991/92	17	1988/89	1998/99	14	-	-	-	
Sonny Moonsammy	1958/59	1958/59	2	-	-	-	-	-	-	
Calvin Moore	1895/96	1895/96	2	-	-	-	-	-	-	
Gudakesh Motie	2015/16	2015/16	5	2015/16	2015/16	7	-	-	-	
Edwin Moulder	1901/02	1912/13	12	-	-	-	-	-	-	
Chimwala Munilall	1968/99	1975/76	6	1972/73	1972/73	1	-	-	-	
Geoffrey Murray	1962/63	1969/70	15	-	-	-	-	-	-	
Mahendra Nagamootoo	1994/95	2006/07	84	1995/96	2008/09	72	2006	2007/08	7	Brother of Vishal Nagamootoo.
Vishal Nagamootoo	1995/96	2004/05	60	1997/98	2003/04	31	-	-	-	
Johnny Naipaul	1944/45	1944/45	1	-	-	-	-	-	-	
Arjune Nandu	1991/92	1991/92	2	-	-	-	-	-	-	
Sunil Narine	-	-	-	-	-	-	2013	2015	27	
Cecil Nascimento	1923/24	1929/30	9	-	-	-	-	-	-	
Clement Neblett	1977/78	1977/78	2	1977/78	1977/78	3	-	-	-	
James Neblett	1925/26	1938	7	-	-	-	-	-	-	
Jermaine Neblett	1996/97	1996/97	1	-	-	-	-	-	-	
Jimmy Neesham	-	-	-	-	-	-	2014	2014	11	
Garvin Nedd	1994/95	1999/2000	14	-	-	-	-	-	-	
Marjoribanks North	1895/96	1896/97	5	-	-	-	-	-	-	
Jonathan Nurse	1909/10	1921/22	4	-	-	-	-	-	-	
Paul Ouckram	1909/10	1924/25	4	-	-	-	-	-	-	
Allan Outridge	1943/44	1945/46	2	-	-	-	-	-	-	Father of Ronald Outridge.
Bruce Pairaudeau	1946/47	1957/58	18	-	-	-	-	-	-	
John Parker	1905/06	1909/10	3	-	-	-	-	-	-	
Brian Patoir	1950/51	1958/59	9	-	-	-	-	-	-	
Charles Paul	1953/54	1954/55	2	-	-	-	-	-	-	
Andre Percival	1991/92	2005/06	31	1993/94	1999/2000	22	-	-	-	
William Perkins	-	-	-	-	-	-	2013	2013	2	
Veerasammy Permaul	2006/07	2015/16	60	2006/07	2015/16	32	2010/11	2015	46	
Adjodha Persaud	1971/72	1977/78	21	1975/76	1975/76	1	-	-	-	
Chatterpaul Persaud	1937/38	1938/39	6	-	-	-	-	-	-	
Ganesha Persaud	1947/48	1952/53	9	-	-	-	-	-	-	Father of Keshwar Persaud.
Keshwar Persaud	1978/79	1980/81	6	1979/80	1980/81	4	-	-	-	Son of Ganesha Persaud.
Indal Persaud	1963/64	1964/65	3	-	-	-	-	-	-	
Paul Persaud	1990/91	1994/95	17	1990/91	1994/95	11	-	-	-	
Elmer Phillips	1921/22	1926/27	8	-	-	-	-	-	-	Brother of John Phillips.
John Phillips	1922/23	1929/30	2	-	-	-	-	-	-	Brother of Elmer Phillips.
Elliot Pilgrim	1909/10	1909/10	3	-	-	-	-	-	-	
Charlie Pooran	1928/29	1928/29	1	-	-	-	-	-	-	
Homchand Pooran	1998/99	2008/09	10	-	-	-	-	-	-	
Milton Pydanna	1970/71	1987/88	63	1972/73	1987/88	24	-	-	-	
Nathan Racker	1901/02	1904/05	5	-	-	-	-	-	-	
Amarnauth Ramcharitar	1979/80	1979/80	1	1979/80	1979/80	1	-	-	-	Son of Bajou Baijnauth.
Ryan Ramdass	2003/04	2005/06	11	2003/04	2005/06	9	-	-	-	
Richard Ramdeen	2010/11	2010/11	1	2010/11	2010/11	3	2010/11	2010/11	2	
Denesh Ramdin	-	-	-	-	-	-	2013	2015	30	
Randolph Ramnarace	1965/66	1972/73	22	-	-	-	-	-	-	
Danny Ramnarais	1986/87	1986/87	1	-	-	-	-	-	-	
Carlton Reece	1938	1950/51	8	-	-	-	-	-	-	
Carlwyn Reid	1903/04	1909/10	5	-	-	-	-	-	-	
Martin Reid	1925/26	1926/27	2	-	-	-	-	-	-	
Raymon Reifer	2014/15	2015/16	12	2014/15	2015/16	12	-	-	-	Son of Elvis Reifer
Glen Robinson	-	-	-	1994/95	1995/96	4	-	-	-	
Vibert Rodney	1952/53	1952/53	1	-	-	-	-	-	-	
Richard Rohoman	1933/34	1934/35	2	-	-	-	-	-	-	
Alwyn Rollox	1931/32	1950/51	5	-	-	-	-	-	-	
Naresh Roopnarine	2002/03	2002/03	1	-	-	-	-	-	-	
Claude St John	1968/69	1973/74	4	-	-	-	-	-	-	
Burlin Saheed	1965/66	1965/66	1	-	-	-	-	-	-	
Krishmar Santokie	1998/99	2008/09	10	-	-	-	2013	2015	20	
Rohan Sarjoo	1996/97	1996/97	1	1996/97	1996/97	1	-	-	-	
Ramnaresh Sarwan	1995/96	2012/13	60	1996/97	2013/14	50	2006	2013	36	
Abdul Sattaur	1985/86	1989/90	4	1987/88	1993/94	5	-	-	-	Brother of Abdool Samad.
Sydney Seaforth	1951/52	1953/54	3	-	-	-	-	-	-	
Ravindranauth Seeram	1983/84	1991/92	31	1984/85	1991/92	12	-	-	-	
Keith Semple	1989/90	2000/01	47	1992/93	2000/01	42	-	-	-	
Vijay Seonarine	-	-	-	1998/99	1998/99	1	-	-	-	
Francis Shankland	1928/29	1928/29	1	-	-	-	-	-	-	
Romario Shepherd	-	-	-	2015/16	2015/16	1	-	-	-	
William Sherlock	1908/09	1910/11	4	-	-	-	-	-	-	
Sew Shivnarine	1970/71	1980/81	27	1976/77	1980/81	9	-	-	-	
Lendl Simmons	-	-	-	-	-	-	2013	2015	29	
Christopher Simpson	1909/10	1911/12	5	-	-	-	-	-	-	
Joseph Simpson	1986/87	1987/88	3	1986/87	1986/87	1	-	-	-	
Chatrapaul Singh	1978/79	1978/79	2	-	-	-	-	-	-	
Gajanand Singh	2007/08	2010/11	10	2008/09	2008/09	2	-	-	-	
Kamal Singh	1981/82	1983/84	5	1981/82	1983/84	7	-	-	-	
Vishaul Singh	2008/09	2015/16	26	2014/15	2015/16	8	-	-	-	
Lonsdale Skinner	1973/74	1976/77	8	1975/76	1976/77	3	-	-	-	
Nigel Slinger	1958/59	1958/59	1	-	-	-	-	-	-	
Douglas Smith	1912/13	1912/13	1	-	-	-	-	-	-	
Samuel Snow	1905/06	1909/10	5	-	-	-	-	-	-	
Collie Solomon	1984/85	1987/88	9	1984/85	1987/88	6	-	-	-	
Joe Solomon	1956/57	1968/69	23	-	-	-	-	-	-	Father of Vinoo Solomon and uncle of Radhray Solomon.
Radhray Solomon	1973/74	1973/74	1	-	-	-	-	-	-	Nephew of Joe Solomon.
Harvey Sproston	1899/1900	1899/1900	3	-	-	-	-	-	-	Brother of Stanley Sproston.
Stanley Sproston	1895/96	1899/1900	9	-	-	-	-	-	-	Brother of Harvey Sproston.
Charlie Stayers	1957/58	1961/62	9	-	-	-	-	-	-	
Leon Stewart	1968/69	1969/70	6	-	-	-	-	-	-	
Navin Stewart	-	-	-	-	-	-	2014	2014	5	
Colin Stuart	1994/95	2002/03	36	1999/2000	2002/03	12	-	-	-	
Isaac Surienarine	1968/69	1970/71	3	-	-	-	-	-	-	
Cecil Thomas	1946/47	1956/57	13	-	-	-	-	-	-	
Bernie Thomas	1948/49	1955/56	4	-	-	-	-	-	-	Cousin of Lenny and Neville Thomas.
Lenny Thomas	1936/37	1952/53	13	-	-	-	-	-	-	Cousin of Bernie and Neville Thomas
Neville Thomas	1953/54	1954/55	5	-	-	-	-	-	-	Cousin of Bernie and Lenny Thomas.
Rayon Thomas	2003/04	2004/05	4	-	-	-	-	-	-	
Emmett Thompson	1903/04	1905/06	2	-	-	-	-	-	-	
Sean Thompson	2000	2000	1	-	-	-	-	-	-	
William Thompson	1907/08	1908/09	2	-	-	-	-	-	-	
John Trim	1943/44	1952/53	15	-	-	-	-	-	-	
Tyrell Tull	-	-	-	-	-	-	2006	2006	4	
Marvin Turpin	1908/09	1909/10	3	-	-	-	-	-	-	
Vivian Tyrell	1945/46	1945/46	1	-	-	-	-	-	-	
Joseph Veerasawmy	1909/10	1922/23	3	-	-	-	-	-	-	
Hubert Vigilance	1944/45	1944/45	1	-	-	-	-	-	-	
Henry Vyfhuis	1896/97	1910/11	9	-	-	-	-	-	-	
Fenton Waddell (Note: Waddell played in a single first-class matches in 1911/12. No biographical details are known.)	1911/12	1911/12	1	-	-	-	-	-	-	
Clyde Walcott	1954/55	1963/64	16	-	-	-	-	-	-	Wisden Cricketer of the Year 1958. Father of Michael Walcott and brother of Keith Walcott
Oscar Weber	1895/96	1907/08	12	-	-	-	-	-	-	Brother of Arthur, Cyril and Walter Weber.
Walter Weber	1896/97	1909/10	12	-	-	-	-	-	-	Brother of Arthur, Cyril and Oscar Weber.
Leonard Westmaas	1945/46	1947/48	8	-	-	-	-	-	-	
William White	1981/82	1983/84	6	1979/80	1984/85	8	-	-	-	
Antonio Whybrew	1922/23	1923/24	2	-	-	-	-	-	-	
David Wiese	-	-	-	-	-	-	2015	2015	5	
Arnold Wight	1946/47	1947/48	3	-	-	-	-	-	-	Brother of Leslie, Peter and Norman Wight.
Leslie Wight	1949/50	1952/53	11	-	-	-	-	-	-	Brother of Arnold, Norman and Peter Wight.
Norman Wight	1946/47	1959/60	23	-	-	-	-	-	-	Brother of Arnold, Leslie and Peter Wight.
Oscar Wight	1926/27	1938	10	-	-	-	-	-	-	Brother of Vibart Wight.
Peter Wight	1950/51	1950/51	1	-	-	-	-	-	-	Brother of Arnold, Leslie and Norman Wight.
Vibart Wight	1925/26	1938	18	-	-	-	-	-	-	Brother of Oscar Wight.
Joe Williams	1931/32	1938	6	-	-	-	-	-	-	
Colin Wiltshire	1958/59	1963/64	8	-	-	-	-	-	-	
Paul Wintz	2012/13	2012/13	3	2011/12	2015/16	19	2010/11	2015	3	
Kenneth Wishart	1928/29	1946/47	15	-	-	-	-	-	-	
Kenneth Wong	1992/93	1997/98	22	1993/94	1996/97	17	-	-	-	
Float Woods	1901/02	1904/05	4	-	-	-	-	-	-	
Edward Wright	1895/96	1896/97	5	-	-	-	-	-	-	Father of Arthur Wright.
