= Kennedy Venkersammy =

Guyanese-born American cricketer

Personal information
- Full name: Kennedy Dasrath Venkersammy (Note: Several sources spell Venkersammy's surname as "Venkasammy", but this is incorrect.)
- Born: February 12, 1951; Albion, British Guiana
- Nickname: "Skello"
- Batting: Right-handed
- Bowling: Right-arm leg spin

International information
- National side: United States (1980–1986)

Domestic team information
- Years: Team
- 1971–1977: Berbice (Guyana)
- Source: CricketArchive, 2 February 2016

Kennedy Dasrath Venkersammy (February 12, 1951 - August 31, 2024) was a former international cricketer who represented the United States national team between 1982 and 1986. He was born in Guyana, and before emigrating to the U.S. played first-class cricket for Berbice.

A right-handed middle-order batsman and right-arm leg spin bowler, Venkersammy played for the Guyanese national team at under-19 level, and also toured England with a West Indies Young Cricketers team in 1970. He made his first-class debut for Berbice in October 1971, playing against Demerara in the final of the inter-county Jones Cup (which at the time held first-class status). Shortly after, Venkersammy emigrated to the United States. However, on a later visit to Guyana in 1975 he made another appearance for Berbice, which was his last at first-class level. Having continued to play club cricket in the U.S., Venkersammy was eventually selected to make his international debut at the 1982 ICC Trophy in England. He played in four of his team's seven matches at the tournament, with notable performances including an innings of 39 against Zimbabwe and bowling figures of 2/9 against Israel. Venkersammy's final international appearances came four years later, at the 1986 ICC Trophy, although he was only selected for two matches.

Several members of Venkersammy's family also played cricket at high levels. His brother, Stanley, played for Berbice (though not at first-class level), while a first cousin, Sen Gopaul, played for Guyana. Venkersammy was more distantly related to the Etwaroo brothers (Romain, Reginald, and Tyrone), and also to Rohan Kanhai, a West Indies Test player.
