= Patrick Evans (cricketer) =

Guyanese cricketer

Personal information
- Born: 16 July 1960 (age 66); Bartica, British Guiana

Domestic team information
- Years: Team
- 1980: Essequibo

Career statistics
Competition	FC
Matches	1
Runs scored	35
Batting average	17.50
100s/50s	0/0
Top score	34
Balls bowled	90
Wickets	1
Bowling average	43.00
5 wickets in innings	0
10 wickets in match	0
Best bowling	1/36
Catches/stumpings	0/–
- Source: CricketArchive, 1 December 2014

Patrick Evans (born 16 July 1960) is a former Guyanese cricketer who played a single first-class match for Essequibo in the final of the 1980–81 inter-county Jones Cup. Aged 20, he was the youngest player on the side, a year younger than Birchmore Reid.

Born in Bartica in what was then British Guiana (now part of Guyana's Cuyuni-Mazaruni region), Evans batted fifth in both innings of the match, played against Berbice at the Kayman Sankar Cricket Ground in Hampton Court (on the Atlantic coast). He scored one run in the first innings, before being caught by Leslaine Lambert off the bowling of Suresh Ganouri. In the second innings, he top-scored with 34 runs before again being dismissed by Ganouri, this time caught by Kamal Singh. Evans had earlier had Singh leg before wicket in Berbice's first innings, his only wicket from 15 overs in the match.

Berbice won the match by nine wickets in what was Essequibo's only first-class match – only the final of the three-team Jones Cup (later the Guystac Trophy) was accorded first-class status, and Essequibo made the final only once, having defeated Demerara in an earlier match. The scorecards of the non-first-class matches played by Essequibo are not available before the late 1990s, and it is therefore uncertain how Evans played for Essequibo (if at all) in earlier matches.
