= Albion, Guyana =

Albion No. 5 Village
- town
- Location in Guyana
- Coordinates: 6°15′0″N 57°22′48″W
- Country: Guyana
- Region: East Berbice-Corentyne

Population (2012)
  - Total: 1,424
- Time zone: UTC-4
- Climate: Af

Albion is a village in East Berbice-Corentyne, Guyana.

== Geography ==
It is located approximately 18 kilometres (11 mi) east of the town of New Amsterdam, Guyana along the one and only main road. Part of Albion is known as Albion High Reef.

Albion was a larger settlement, but has been broken up into smaller adjacent villages such as Hampshire, Nigg, Chesney, Belvedere, Sand Reef, Dr Bush, Guava Bush and Topoo.

== Demographics ==
The town has 1,424 inhabitants as of 2012, mostly Indo-Guyanese.

The village has four mandirs, one mosque and two Christian churches.

== Economy ==
The Albion Sugar Estate (owned by Guyana Sugar Corporation) is a major employer in the area (3,400 reported in 2011). The estate also has medical facilities which is also provided to non-employees in a limited fashion. Other health centres are in Williamsburg or Fyrish. Fishing and other agriculture make up the economic activities outside of the sugar industry. GuySuCo also manages the Albion Community Development Centre for cricket.

== Public Services ==
Albion has a police station and magistrate's court. Albion's primary school, Cropper Primary school was named for its founder, who built it as a part of the Canadian Presbyterian Mission, thought it has since been made public and non-denominational. For secondary school, children attend in other towns, such as Rose Hall, Port Mourant and New Amsterdam.

Camal's International Home for Homeless & Battered Women was opened in Albion in 1996. It is supported by local and international donations.

== Sports Complex ==
The Albion Sports Complex is an entertainment and sports venue, and is one of the home grounds of the Guyana cricket team.

The stadium hosted its first international cricket match on 16 March 1977, between West Indies and Pakistan and won by the West Indies by four wickets. It was the first ODI match in the Caribbean. The venue has hosted five One Day Internationals but none for over two decades. Many great cricketers started their careers representing Albion Sports Complex Club, Test cricketer Sew Shivnarine and Guyanese representatives Amarnauth Ramcharitar, Kamal Singh, Suresh Ganouri and Michael Chin.

The complex also hosts trade expos and beauty pageants, and melās to celebrate Indian Arrival Day.
