= 1974–75 Shell Shield season =

Cricket tournament

- Dates: 14 March – 11 April 1975
- Administrator: WICB
- Cricket format: First-class (four-day)
- Tournament format: Round-robin
- Champions: Guyana (2nd title)
- Participants: 5
- Matches: 10
- Most runs: (Guyana) Roy Fredericks (545)
- Most wickets: (Antigua and Barbuda) Andy Roberts (25)

The 1974–75 Shell Shield season was the ninth edition of what is now the Regional Four Day Competition, the domestic first-class cricket competition for the countries of the West Indies Cricket Board (WICB). The tournament was sponsored by Royal Dutch Shell, with matches played from 14 March to 11 April 1975 (a much shorter duration than in previous seasons).

Five teams contested the competition – Barbados, the Combined Islands, Guyana, Jamaica, and Trinidad and Tobago. Owing to a high number of draws (only four of the ten matches were played to completion), three teams finished the round-robin undefeated. Of those, Guyana had the most points, thus claiming their second Shell Shield title. Guyanese batsman Roy Fredericks led the tournament in runs, while Combined Islands fast bowler Andy Roberts was the leading wicket-taker.

== Points table ==
Team	Pld	W	L	LWF	DWF	DLF	Pts
Guyana	4	2	0	0	0	2	28
Combined Islands	4	1	0	0	2	1	26
Jamaica	4	0	0	0	3	1	20
Barbados	4	1	1	1	0	1	18
Trinidad and Tobago	4	0	2	0	1	1	8
Source: CricketArchive

Key

- W – Outright win (12 points)
- L – Outright loss (0 points)
- LWF – Lost match, but won first innings (4 points)
- DWF – Drawn, but won first innings (6 points)
- DLF – Drawn, but lost first innings (2 points)
- Pts – Total points

== Statistics ==
=== Most runs ===
The top five run-scorers are included in this table, listed by runs scored and then by batting average.

Player	Team	Runs	Inns	Avg	Highest	100s	50s
Roy Fredericks	Guyana	545	7	109.00	250	1	3
Larry Gomes	Trinidad and Tobago	482	8	68.85	171*	1	4
Collis King	Barbados	431	8	71.83	103*	1	4
Viv Richards	Combined Islands	363	7	51.85	112	2	2
Lockhart Sebastien	Combined Islands	290	7	41.42	86	0	2

=== Most wickets ===
The top five wicket-takers are listed in this table, listed by wickets taken and then by bowling average.

Player	Team	Overs	Wkts	Ave	5	10	BBI
Andy Roberts	Combined Islands	131.5	25	12.72	2	0	6/35
Sydney Matthews	Guyana	154.1	20	21.50	0	0	4/85
Keith Cameron	Guyana	163.0	20	24.75	1	0	7/91
Imtiaz Ali	Trinidad and Tobago	125.0	16	25.00	1	0	6/64
Vanburn Holder	Barbados	126.0	15	18.40	0	0	4/29
