= Walter Griffith =

Walter Griffith may refer to:

- Walter Griffith (Royal Navy officer) (died 1779), officer of the Royal Navy during the American War of Independence
- Walter Griffith (cricketer) (1915–1983), Guyanese cricketer
- Walter T. Griffith (1911–1966), United States Navy submarine commander

== See also ==
- Walter Griffiths (disambiguation)
