= Isaac Henry =

Isaac Henry may refer to:

- Isaac Henry (cricketer)
- Isaac Henry (rugby union)
