= Martin Reid =

Martin Reid may refer to:

- Martin Reid (actor) (born 1964), British actor and comedian
- Martin Reid (cricketer) (1907–1970), Guyanese cricketer
- Martin Reid (diplomat) (1928–2006), British diplomat
- Marty Reid (born 1953), American television sportscaster

== See also ==
- Martin Read (born 1950), British businessman
- Martin Reed (born 1978), English footballer
