= Leon Stewart =

Leon Stewart may refer to:

- Leon Stewart (cricketer)
- Leon Stewart (baseball)
