= Oscar Weber =

Guyanese cricketer

Personal information
- Full name: Oscar William Weber
- Born: 17 October 1871; Georgetown, British Guiana
- Died: 17 December 1946 (aged 75); Bedford, Bedfordshire, England
- Batting: Right-handed
- Bowling: Left-arm fast-medium
- Relatives: Cyril Weber (brother); Arthur Weber (brother); Walter Weber (brother); Ian Fleming (nephew); Francis Austin (brother-in-law); Russell Garnett (brother-in-law)

Domestic team information
- Years: Team
- 1891/92–1897/98: Demerara
- 1895/96–1907/08: British Guiana

Career statistics
Competition	First-class
Matches	18
Runs scored	344
Batting average	11.09
100s/50s	0/1
Top score	55
Balls bowled	400
Wickets	25
Bowling average	11.47
5 wickets in innings	2
10 wickets in match	2
Best bowling	8/17
Catches/stumpings	14/–
- Source: Cricinfo, 29 July 2019

Oscar William Weber (17 October 1871 – 27 December 1946) was a Guyanese first-class cricketer.

Weber was born at Georgetown in British Guiana. He made his debut in first-class cricket for Demerara against Barbados at Bay Pasture, Barbados in the 1891–92 Inter-Colonial Tournament. He made two further first-class appearances for Demerara in that seasons tournament. His next appearances in first-class cricket came for British Guiana, playing twice against Trinidad and Barbados in the 1895–96 Inter-Colonial Tournament. In September 1896, he played twice for British Guiana against Jamaica at Georgetown. In February 1897, he played for the West Indies against A. A. Priestley's XI, while in March of the same year he played for British Guiana against a Lord Hawke's XI; the following month, he played for Lord Hawke's XI against British Guiana, likely due to a broken finger suffered by Hugh Bromley-Davenport, which limited his appearances on the tour. He played his final first-class match for Demerara in the final of the 1897–98 Inter-Colonial Tournament. A gap of four years followed before his next first-class appearance for British Guiana in September 1901. Between 1902–07, he made six further first-class appearances for British Guiana. In eighteen first-class appearances, he scored 255 runs at an average of 11.09 and a highest score of 55. With his left-arm fast-medium bowling, he took 25 wickets at a bowling average of 11.47, with best figures of 8 for 17. He took five wickets in an innings on two occasions and took the same number of ten wicket hauls. His best figures came for Demerara on debut against Barbados.

Weber worked as a civil servant, and was married to Maud Frances. He later emigrated to England, where he died at Bedford in December 1946. His brothers Cyril, Arthur and Walter all played first-class cricket, as did his brothers-in-law Francis Austin and Russell Garnett, and his nephew Ian Fleming.
