= Keshwar =

Keshwar may refer to:

- Tatum Keshwar (born 1983), South African-Indian model
- Keshwar Persaud (born 1958), Guyanese cricketer
- Kishwer Merchant (born 1981), Indian television actress
- Kishwer Falkner, Baroness Falkner of Margravine (born 1955), British politician
- Kishwer Zehra, Pakistani politician
- Kishwar Desai (born 1956), Indian author and columnist
- Kishwar Naheed (born 1940), Pakistani poet and writer
- Madhu Kishwar (born 1951), Indian activist and writer
- Istgah-e Keshvar, a village in Iran
