= Ron Matthews =

Ron Matthews may refer to:

- Ron Matthews (musician), English past member of heavy metal band Iron Maiden
- Ron Matthews (cricketer) (born 1983), Guyanese cricketer

== See also ==
- Ronnie Mathews (1935–2008), American jazz pianist
