= Ian Fleming (cricketer) =

English cricketer

Personal information
- Full name: Ian Douglas Keith Fleming
- Born: 21 August 1908; Georgetown, British Guiana
- Died: 4 July 1988 (aged 79); Pembury, Kent, England
- Batting: Right-handed

Domestic team information
- Years: Team
- 1934: Kent

Career statistics
Competition	First-class
Matches	5
Runs scored	183
Batting average	30.50
100s/50s	0/1
Top score	66
Catches/stumpings	5/–
- Source: CricInfo, 26 January 2017

Ian Douglas Keith Fleming (21 August 1908 – 4 July 1988) was an English amateur cricketer. A school cricketer of renown, Fleming later played in five first-class cricket matches in the mid-1930s.

== Life and career ==
Fleming was born at Georgetown in British Guiana in 1908. He was educated at Winchester College where he opened the batting for the cricket XI in 1926 and 1927, forming a partnership with Patrick Kingsley. In 1926 the pair opened the batting for the Public Schools team against the touring Australians, with Fleming scoring 11 runs. In 1927 he scored 109 against Charterhouse School, 210 in 200 minutes against Eton College and 110 for the Public Schools against the Army. After he left school he worked in the City of London and played club cricket, including for clubs such as Free Foresters and Band of Brothers.

In May and June 1934 Fleming made three first-class appearances for Kent County Cricket Club. On his debut against Essex at Brentwood, he scored an unbeaten 42 runs as Kent set their record first-class score of 803 for 4. Later that season he played for HDG Leveson Gower's XI against Oxford University, making his highest first-class score of 66. His final first-class match was in the same fixture the following year. He had played one match for Kent's Second XI in 1927 in the Minor Counties Championship and made another appearance in the competition in 1934.

A number of members of Fleming's extended family also played first-class cricket. His uncle Andrew Weber played twice for Western Province in South Africa, and four other uncles, George Garnett, Arthur Weber, Oscar Weber and Walter Weber, all played at first-class level in the Caribbean. Fleming died at Pembury in Kent in 1988 aged 79.

== Bibliography ==
- Carlaw, Derek (2020). Kent County Cricketers, A to Z: Part Two (1919–1939) (PDF). Cardiff: ACS.
