= International cricket in 1901–02 =

International cricket season

The 1901–02 international cricket season was from September 1901 to April 1902.

== Season overview ==
International tours
Start date	Home team	Away team	Results [Matches]			
Start date	Home team	Away team	Test	ODI	FC	LA
13 December 1901	Australia	England	4–1 [5]	—	—	—
29 January 1902	West Indies	England	—	—	2–1 [3]	—

== December ==
=== England in Australia ===
The Ashes Test series
No.	Date	Home captain	Away captain	Venue	Result
Test 65	13–16 December	Joe Darling	Archie MacLaren	Sydney Cricket Ground, Sydney	England by an innings and 124 runs
Test 66	1–4 January	Joe Darling	Archie MacLaren	Melbourne Cricket Ground, Melbourne	Australia by 229 runs
Test 67	17–23 January	Joe Darling	Archie MacLaren	Adelaide Oval, Adelaide	Australia by 4 wickets
Test 68	14–18 February	Hugh Trumble	Archie MacLaren	Sydney Cricket Ground, Sydney	Australia by 7 wickets
Test 69	28 Feb–4 March	Hugh Trumble	Archie MacLaren	Melbourne Cricket Ground, Melbourne	Australia by 32 runs

== January ==
=== England in the West Indies ===
First-class Series
No.	Date	Home captain	Away captain	Venue	Result
Match 1	29–30 January	Harold Austin	Richard Bennett	Kensington Oval, Bridgetown	West Indies by an innings and 4 runs
Match 2	31 Mar–4 April	Bertie Harragin	Richard Bennett	Queen's Park Oval, Port of Spain	West Indies by 111 runs
Match 3	4–7 April	Clement King	Richard Bennett	Bourda, Georgetown	Bennett's XI by an innings and 330 runs
