= Roopnarine =

Roopnarine is a surname. Notable people with the surname include:

- Gowkaran Roopnarine (born 1982), Guyana-born American cricketer
- Naresh Roopnarine (born 1980), Guyanese cricketer
- Narindra Roopnarine, Trinidad and Tobago politician
- Stacy Roopnarine (born c. 1985), Trinidad and Tobago politician

== See also ==
- Rupert Roopnaraine (born 1943), Guyanese cricketer, writer and politician.
- Roop (disambiguation)
- Narine
