= John Dare =

John Dare may refer to:

- John Dare (cricketer), Guyanese cricketer
- John T. Dare, politician, in Arizona, California and Hawaii

== See also ==
- Johnny Dare, American radio personality
