= Glen Robinson =

Glen Robinson may refer to:

- Glen Robinson (cricketer) (born 1971), Guyanese cricketer
- Glen Robinson (visual effects) (1914–2002), American special effects artist
- Glen Robinson (water polo) (born 1989), British water polo player
- Glen O. Robinson (born 1936), American attorney and Federal Communications Commission commissioner
- Glen P. Robinson (1923–2013), American technologist

== See also ==
- Glenn Robinson (disambiguation)
