= John Branch (disambiguation) =

John Branch (1782–1863) was an American politician who served as U.S. Senator, Secretary of the Navy and the 19th governor of the state of North Carolina.

John Branch may also refer to:

- John Branch (cricketer) (1901–1950), Guyanese cricketer
- John Branch (journalist), American journalist
