= Birchmore Reid =

Guyanese cricketer

Personal information
- Born: 16 March 1959 (age 67); Windsor Castle, British Guiana

Domestic team information
- Years: Team
- 1980: Essequibo

Career statistics
Competition	FC
Matches	1
Runs scored	56
Batting average	28.00
100s/50s	0/0
Top score	42
Balls bowled	126
Wickets	0
Bowling average	n/a
5 wickets in innings	0
10 wickets in match	0
Best bowling	0/48
Catches/stumpings	0/–
- Source: CricketArchive, 1 December 2014

Birchmore Reid (born 16 March 1959) is a former Guyanese cricketer who played a single first-class match for Essequibo in the final of the 1980–81 inter-county Jones Cup. Aged 21, he was the second-youngest player on the side, after Patrick Evans.

Reid, born in Windsor Castle in what was then British Guiana (now part of Guyana's Pomeroon-Supenaam region), was Essequibo's top-scoring batsman in the match. He played against Berbice at the Kayman Sankar Cricket Ground in Hampton Court (on the Atlantic coast). He scored 56 runs altogether, despite coming in low in the batting order in both innings. In the first inning, he came in seventh, and top-scored with 42 runs before being caught by Amarnauth Ramcharitar off the bowling of Reginald Etwaroo, who took 4/29. In the second inning, he came in eighth, and made 10 runs before again being dismissed by Etwaroo, this time caught by Milton Pydanna, a future West Indies ODI player. Reid also bowled 21 overs in Berbice's first innings (the most of any Essequibian), but failed to take a wicket.

Berbice won the match by nine wickets in what was Essequibo's only first-class match – only the final of the three-team Jones Cup (later the Guystac Trophy) was accorded first-class status, and Essequibo made the final only once, having defeated Demerara in an earlier match. The scorecards of the non-first-class matches played by Essequibo are not available before the late 1990s, and it is therefore uncertain how Reid played for Essequibo in other matches. However, Reid was still playing competitive cricket as late as 1994, when he appeared for North Essequibo against East Bank in the final of the S. N. Singh tournament, played at Georgetown's Bourda ground.
