= John Farnum =

John Farnum may refer to:

- John Farnum (cricketer), Guyanese cricketer
- John Egbert Farnum, United States Army general
