= Collie Solomon =

Guyanese cricketer (born 1959)

Personal information
- Born: 23 November 1959 (age 66); New Amsterdam, British Guiana
- Source: Cricinfo, 19 November 2020

Collie Solomon (born 23 November 1959) is a Guyanese cricketer. He played in fourteen first-class and six List A matches for Guyana from 1983 to 1988.

== See also ==
- List of Guyanese representative cricketers
