= Eric Chase =

Guyanese cricketer (1931–1989)

Personal information
- Born: 30 January 1931; Berbice, British Guiana
- Died: 19 July 1989 (aged 58); Guyana
- Source: Cricinfo, 19 November 2020

Eric Chase (30 January 1931 – 19 July 1989) was a Guyanese cricketer. He played in one first-class match for British Guiana in 1951/52.

== See also ==
- List of Guyanese representative cricketers
