= Imtiaz Harper =

Guyanese cricketer (born 1962)

Personal information
- Born: 4 April 1962 (age 64); Georgetown, British Guiana
- Source: Cricinfo, 19 November 2020

Imtiaz Harper (born 4 April 1962) is a Guyanese cricketer. He played in eight first-class and five List A matches for Guyana from 1986 to 1991.

== See also ==
- List of Guyanese representative cricketers
