= Jackson Gill (cricketer) =

Guyanese cricketer (1881–1920)

Personal information
- Born: 17 April 1881; Demerara, British Guiana
- Died: 21 July 1920 (aged 39); British Guiana
- Source: Cricinfo, 19 November 2020

Jackson Gill (17 April 1881 – 21 July 1920) was a cricketer. He played in three first-class matches for British Guiana from 1901 to 1905.

== See also ==
- List of Guyanese representative cricketers
