= Joseph Elvis =

Guyanese cricketer (1924–1972)

Personal information
- Born: 14 February 1924; Demerara, British Guiana
- Died: 3 June 1972 (aged 48); Guyana
- Source: Cricinfo, 19 November 2020

Joseph Elvis (14 February 1924 – 3 June 1972) was a Guyanese cricketer. He played in two first-class matches for British Guiana in 1944/45 and 1945/46.

== See also ==
- List of Guyanese representative cricketers
