= Sheik Mohammed =

Guyanese cricketer (born 1964)

Personal information
- Born: 9 April 1964 (age 62); Demerara, British Guiana
- Source: Cricinfo, 19 November 2020

Sheik Mohammed (born 9 April 1964) is a Guyanese cricketer. He played in 19 first-class and 14 List A matches for Guyana from 1987 to 1999.

== See also ==
- List of Guyanese representative cricketers
