= Hubert Vigilance =

Guyanese cricketer (born 1928)

Personal information
- Born: 17 November 1928; New Amsterdam, British Guiana
- Source: Cricinfo, 19 November 2020

Hubert Alexander Vigilance (born 17 November 1928) was a Guyanese cricketer. He played in one first-class match for British Guiana in 1944/45.

== See also ==
- List of Guyanese representative cricketers
