= Dion Ferrier =

Guyanese cricketer (born 1980)

Personal information
- Born: 14 May 1980 (age 46)
- Source: Cricinfo, 19 November 2020

Dion Ferrier (born 14 May 1980) is a Guyanese cricketer. He played in nine List A and four Twenty20 matches for Guyana from 2006 to 2008.

== See also ==
- List of Guyanese representative cricketers
