= Cecil Nascimento =

Guyanese cricketer (1903–1952)

Personal information
- Born: 13 September 1903; New Amsterdam, British Guiana
- Died: 16 March 1952 (aged 48); British Guiana
- Source: Cricinfo, 19 November 2020

Cecil Nascimento (13 September 1903 – 16 March 1952) was a Guyanese cricketer. He played in ten first-class matches for British Guiana from 1923 to 1930.

== See also ==
- List of Guyanese representative cricketers
