= Stephen Bamfield =

Guyanese cricketer (born 1950)

Personal information
- Born: 23 May 1950 (age 76); Georgetown, British Guiana
- Source: Cricinfo, 19 November 2020

Stephen Bamfield (born 23 May 1950) is a Guyanese cricketer. He played in twenty-three first-class and four List A matches for Guyana from 1971 to 1987.

== See also ==
- List of Guyanese representative cricketers
