= Alvin Jemmott =

Guyanese cricketer

Personal information
- Born: 21 June 1906; Demerara, British Guiana
- Source: Cricinfo, 19 November 2020

Alvin Jemmott (born 21 June 1906, date of death unknown) was a Guyanese cricketer. He played in one first-class match for British Guiana in 1925/26.

== See also ==
- List of Guyanese representative cricketers
