= Henry Croal =

Guyanese cricketer

Personal information
- Born: 27 March 1891; Demerara, British Guiana
- Died: 2 June 1948 (aged 57); British Guiana
- Source: Cricinfo, 19 November 2020

Henry Croal (27 March 1891 – 2 June 1948) was a cricketer from British Guiana. He played in nine first-class matches for British Guiana from 1910 to 1923.

== See also ==
- List of Guyanese representative cricketers
