= Linden Fraser =

Guyanese cricketer (born 1964)

Personal information
- Full name: Linden Aggrey Kaunda Fraser
- Born: 4 September 1964 (age 62); Berbice, British Guiana
- Source: Cricinfo, 19 November 2020

Linden Aggrey Kaunda Fraser (born 4 September 1964) is a former Guyanese cricketer. He played in four first-class matches for Guyana from 1983 to 1990.

Fraser later moved to the United States where he coached women's and junior teams at high level, including coaching the United States women's national cricket team in 2011. However, he came into conflict with the leadership of the United States of America Cricket Association (USACA) on a number of occasions.

== See also ==
- List of Guyanese representative cricketers
