= Peter Bayley (cricketer) =

West Indian cricketer (1916–1996)

Personal information
- Full name: Herbert Peter Bayley
- Born: 9 April 1916; Georgetown, British Guiana
- Died: 29 September 1996 (aged 80); Morris, New Jersey, United States of America
- Batting: Right-handed

Domestic team information
- Years: Team
- 1935-36 to 1950-51: British Guiana

Career statistics
Competition	First-class
Matches	28
Runs scored	1577
Batting average	34.28
100s/50s	3/8
Top score	268
Balls bowled	8
Wickets	0
Bowling average	–
5 wickets in innings	–
10 wickets in match	–
Best bowling	–
Catches/stumpings	11/0
- Source: CricketArchive, 24 January 2017

Herbert Peter Bayley (9 April 1916 – 29 December 1996) was a first-class cricketer from British Guiana who toured with the West Indian cricket team in England in 1939.

His highest score was 268 for British Guiana against Barbados in 1937–38.

His uncle was fellow cricketer Benjamin Bayley.
