= George Garnett (cricketer) =

Guyanese cricketer (1865–1954)

Personal information
- Born: 19 June 1865; Liverpool, England
- Died: 15 May 1954 (aged 88); London, England
- Source: Cricinfo, 19 November 2020

George Garnett (19 June 1865 – 15 May 1954) was a Guyanese cricketer. He played in eight first-class matches for British Guiana from 1887 to 1897.

== See also ==
- List of Guyanese representative cricketers
