= John Bahadur =

Guyanese cricketer (1917–1981)

Personal information
- Born: 17 June 1917; Essequibo, British Guiana
- Died: 10 February 1981 (aged 63); Trinidad
- Source: Cricinfo, 19 November 2020

John Bahadur (17 June 1917 – 10 February 1981) was a Guyanese cricketer. He played in one first-class match for British Guiana in 1943/44.

== See also ==
- List of Guyanese representative cricketers
