= Hilton Drummett =

Guyanese cricketer (1917–1965)

Hilton Dummett
Personal information
- Born: 21 April 1917; Demerara, British Guiana
- Died: 4 December 1965 (aged 48); British Guiana
- Source: Cricinfo, 19 November 2020

Hilton Dummett (21 April 1917 – 4 December 1965) was a Guyanese cricketer. He played in one first-class match for British Guiana in 1938/39.

== See also ==
- List of Guyanese representative cricketers
