= Bahadur Mohabir =

Guyanese cricketer (born 1940)

Personal information
- Born: 19 November 1940 (age 85); Berbice, British Guiana
- Source: Cricinfo, 19 November 2020

Bahadur Mohabir (born 19 November 1940) is a Guyanese cricketer. He played in two first-class matches for British Guiana in 1960/61 and 1961/62.

== See also ==
- List of Guyanese representative cricketers
