= Frederick Hartman =

Guyanese cricketer (born 1952)

Personal information
- Born: 29 January 1952 (age 74); Georgetown, British Guiana
- Source: Cricinfo, 19 November 2020

Frederick Hartman (born 29 January 1952) is a Guyanese cricketer. He played in four first-class and two List A matches for Guyana from 1975 to 1978.

== See also ==
- List of Guyanese representative cricketers
