= Edward Fraser (cricketer) =

Guyanese cricketer (1881–1933)

Personal information
- Born: 11 July 1881; Demerara, British Guiana
- Died: 21 February 1933 (aged 51); British Guiana
- Source: Cricinfo, 19 November 2020

Edward Fraser (11 July 1881 – 21 February 1933) was a Guyanese cricketer. He played in five first-class matches for British Guiana from 1903 to 1911.

== See also ==
- List of Guyanese representative cricketers
