= Kenneth Wong (cricketer) =

Guyanese cricketer (born 1973)

Personal information
- Born: 22 May 1973 (age 53); Georgetown, British Guiana
- Source: Cricinfo, 19 November 2020

Kenneth Wong (born 22 May 1973) is a Guyanese former cricketer. He played in 23 first-class and 17 List A matches for Guyana from 1992 to 1998. Wong played West Indies ‘B’ team wicketkeeper and batsman.

He served as vice-president of the Roraima Bikers Club in 2009.

== See also ==
- List of Guyanese representative cricketers
