= Arnold Gibbons =

Guyanese cricketer (born 1930)

Personal information
- Born: 19 October 1930 (age 96); Demerara, British Guiana
- Source: Cricinfo, 19 November 2020

Arnold Gibbons (born 19 October 1930) is a Guyanese cricketer and professor of communications. He played in two first-class matches for British Guiana in 1952/53 and 1953/54.

Gibbons was born in Triumph, Demerara. He was captain of the Queen's College cricket team before representing British Guiana.

Gibbons read philosophy at University College, London University. He holds graduate degrees from Syracuse and Cornell Universities. He was a professor of communications at Hunter College, New York, USA.

== Works ==
- The legacy of Walter Rodney in Guyana and the Caribbean (2011) University Press of America. (ISBN 9780761854142)
- Race, politics & the white media : the Jesse Jackson campaigns (1993) University Press of America. (ISBN 0819189774)
- Walter Rodney and His Times. (1994) Guyana National Printers Limited.

== See also ==
- List of Guyanese representative cricketers
