= Richard Rohoman =

Guyanese cricketer (1910–1953)

Personal information
- Born: 29 July 1910; Demerara, British Guiana
- Died: 11 April 1953 (aged 42); British Guiana
- Source: Cricinfo, 19 November 2020

Richard Rohoman (29 July 1910 – 11 April 1953) was a Guyanese cricketer. He played in two first-class matches for British Guiana in 1933/34 and 1934/35.

== See also ==
- List of Guyanese representative cricketers
