= Shemroy Barrington =

Guyanese cricketer (born 1988)

Personal information
- Born: 20 January 1988 (age 38); Guyana
- Source: Cricinfo, 19 November 2020

Shemroy Barrington (born 20 January 1988) is a Guyanese cricketer. He played in seven first-class matches for Guyana from 2009 to 2011.

== See also ==
- List of Guyanese representative cricketers
