= Ovid Glasgow =

Guyanese cricketer (born 1945)

Personal information
- Born: 14 April 1945 (age 81); Demerara, British Guiana
- Source: Cricinfo, 19 November 2020

Ovid Glasgow (born 14 April 1945) is a Guyanese cricketer. He played in four first-class and two List A matches for Guyana from 1966 to 1972.

== See also ==
- List of Guyanese representative cricketers
