= Simon Hinds =

Guyanese cricketer (1887–1943)

Personal information
- Born: 14 July 1887; Demerara, British Guiana
- Died: 7 December 1943 (aged 56); British Guiana
- Source: Cricinfo, 19 November 2020

Simon Hinds (14 July 1887 – 7 December 1943) was a Guyanese cricketer. He played in nine first-class matches for British Guiana from 1909 to 1913.

== See also ==
- List of Guyanese representative cricketers
