= Rodney Belgrave =

Guyanese cricketer

Personal information
- Born: 30 March 1881; New Amsterdam, British Guiana
- Died: 1 August 1926 (aged 45); British Guiana
- Source: Cricinfo, 19 November 2020

Rodney Belgrave (30 March 1881 – 1 August 1926) was a cricketer. He played in two first-class matches for British Guiana and Trinidad in 1905/06 and 1908/09.

== See also ==
- List of Guyanese representative cricketers
