= Neville Maynard =

Guyanese cricketer (born 1930)

Personal information
- Born: 19 January 1930 (age 96); Georgetown, British Guiana
- Source: Cricinfo, 19 November 2020

Neville Maynard (born 19 January 1930) is a Guyanese cricketer. He played in two first-class matches for British Guiana in 1952/53.

== See also ==
- List of Guyanese representative cricketers
