= Leslie Amsterdam =

Guyanese cricketer (1934–1999)

Personal information
- Born: 17 July 1934; Essequibo, British Guiana
- Died: 12 March 1999 (aged 64); Georgetown, Guyana
- Source: Cricinfo, 19 November 2020

Leslie Amsterdam (17 July 1934 – 12 March 1999) was a Guyanese cricketer. He played in eight first-class matches for British Guiana from 1958 to 1965.

== See also ==
- List of Guyanese representative cricketers
