= Radhray Solomon =

Guyanese cricketer (born 1954)

Personal information
- Born: 14 November 1954 (age 71); Berbice, British Guiana
- Source: Cricinfo, 19 November 2020

Radhray Solomon (born 14 November 1954) is a Guyanese cricketer. He played in two first-class matches for Guyana in 1973/74.

== See also ==
- List of Guyanese representative cricketers
