= William McCowan =

Guyanese cricketer

Personal information
- Born: 23 June 1891; Demerara, British Guiana
- Source: Cricinfo, 19 November 2020

William McCowan (born 23 June 1891, date of death unknown) was a British Guiana cricketer. He played in one first-class match for British Guiana in 1911/12.

== See also ==
- List of Guyanese representative cricketers
