= Neil Barry =

Guyanese cricketer (born 1966)

Personal information
- Born: 6 August 1966 (age 60); Demerara, Guyana
- Source: Cricinfo, 19 November 2020

Neil Barry (born 6 August 1966) is a Guyanese cricketer. He played in nine first-class and twelve List A matches for Guyana from 1987 to 1996.

== See also ==
- List of Guyanese representative cricketers
