= Geoffrey Murray =

Guyanese cricketer (born 1943)

Personal information
- Born: 1 February 1943 (age 83); Georgetown, British Guiana
- Source: Cricinfo, 19 November 2020

Geoffrey Murray (born 1 February 1943) is a Guyanese cricketer. He played in fifteen first-class matches for Guyana from 1962 to 1970.

== See also ==
- List of Guyanese representative cricketers
