= Leslie Fernandes =

Guyanese cricketer (1938–1977)

Personal information
- Born: 16 May 1938; Georgetown, British Guiana
- Died: 29 April 1977 (aged 38); Guyana
- Source: Cricinfo, 19 November 2020

Leslie Fernandes (16 May 1938 – 29 April 1977) was a Guyanese cricketer. He played in one first-class match for British Guiana in 1960/61.

== See also ==
- List of Guyanese representative cricketers
