= Ganesha Persaud =

Guyanese cricketer (1925–1981)

Personal information
- Born: 14 January 1925; Demerara, British Guiana
- Died: 19 March 1981 (aged 56); Guyana
- Source: Cricinfo, 19 November 2020

Ganesha Persaud (14 January 1925 – 19 March 1981) was a Guyanese cricketer. He played in nine first-class matches for British Guiana from 1947 to 1953.

== See also ==
- List of Guyanese representative cricketers
