= Robin Browne =

Guyanese cricketer (born 1970)

Personal information
- Born: 26 May 1970 (age 56); Georgetown, Guyana
- Source: Cricinfo, 19 November 2020

Robin Browne (born 26 May 1970) is a Guyanese cricketer. He played in two first-class and six List A matches for Guyana in 1995/96.

== See also ==
- List of Guyanese representative cricketers
