= Chester Bourne =

Guyanese cricketer

Personal information
- Born: 1889; Saint Michael, Barbados
- Died: Unknown
- Source: Cricinfo, 19 November 2020

Chester Bourne (born 1889, date of death unknown) was a cricketer from British Guiana. He played in one first-class match for British Guiana in 1922/23.

== See also ==
- List of Guyanese representative cricketers
