= Paul Cressall =

English cricketer

Personal information
- Born: 2 May 1893; Bromley, England
- Died: 8 April 1943 (aged 49); Stanley Internment Camp, Hong Kong
- Source: Cricinfo, 19 November 2020

Paul Ewart Francis Cressall (2 May 1893 – 8 April 1943) was an English cricketer. He played in four first-class matches for British Guiana from 1911 to 1923. He died in the Stanley Internment Camp during World War II.

== See also ==
- List of Guyanese representative cricketers
