= Neville Thomas =

Guyanese cricketer (born 1934)

Personal information
- Born: 18 January 1934 (age 92); Essequibo, British Guiana
- Source: Cricinfo, 19 November 2020

Neville Thomas (born 18 January 1934) is a Guyanese cricketer. He played in five first-class matches for British Guiana in 1953/54 and 1954/55.

== See also ==
- List of Guyanese representative cricketers
