= Lloyd Harper =

Guyanese cricketer (born 1949)

Personal information
- Born: 8 March 1949 (age 77); Georgetown, British Guiana
- Source: Cricinfo, 19 November 2020

Lloyd Harper (born 8 March 1949) is a Guyanese cricketer. He played in one List A and six first-class matches for Guyana from 1976 to 1982.

== See also ==
- List of Guyanese representative cricketers
