= John Blackman (cricketer) =

Guyanese cricketer

Personal information
- Born: 17 August 1891; Georgetown, British Guiana
- Died: 19 July 1941 (aged 49); British Guiana
- Source: Cricinfo, 19 November 2020

John Blackman (17 August 1891 – 19 July 1941) was a cricketer from British Guiana. He played in three first-class matches for British Guiana from 1912 to 1922.

== See also ==
- List of Guyanese representative cricketers
