= Devon Drayton =

Guyanese cricketer

Personal information
- Born: 14 September 1888; Demerara, British Guiana
- Died: 27 November 1941 (aged 53); British Guiana
- Source: Cricinfo, 19 November 2020

Devon Drayton (14 September 1888 – 27 November 1941) was a cricketer from British Guiana. He played in four first-class matches for British Guiana from 1908 to 1922.

== See also ==
- List of Guyanese representative cricketers
