= Nathan Racker =

Guyanese cricketer

Personal information
- Born: 23 November 1880; British Guiana
- Source: Cricinfo, 19 November 2020

Nathan Racker (born 23 November 1880, date of death unknown) was a cricketer. He played in five first-class matches for British Guiana from 1901 to 1905.

== See also ==
- List of Guyanese representative cricketers
