= Rex Collymore =

Guyanese cricketer (born 1939)

Personal information
- Born: 10 June 1939 (age 87); Demerara, British Guiana
- Source: Cricinfo, 19 November 2020

Rex Collymore (born 10 June 1939) is a Guyanese cricketer. He played in 1 List A and 41 first-class matches for Guyana from 1963 to 1976.

== See also ==
- List of Guyanese representative cricketers
