= John Phillips (Guyanese cricketer) =

Guyanese cricketer (1902–1967)

Personal information
- Born: 16 September 1902; Georgetown, British Guiana
- Died: 8 February 1967 (aged 64); Guyana
- Source: Cricinfo, 19 November 2020

John Phillips (16 September 1902 – 8 February 1967) was a Guyanese cricketer. He played in two first-class matches for British Guiana in 1922/23 and 1929/30.

== See also ==
- List of Guyanese representative cricketers
