= Malcolm Austin =

Guyanese cricketer (1880–1958)

Personal information
- Born: 24 May 1880; Thornbury, England
- Died: 8 January 1958 (aged 77); Barbados
- Source: Cricinfo, 19 November 2020

Malcolm Austin (24 May 1880 – 8 January 1958) was a Guyanese cricketer. He played in seven first-class matches for British Guiana from 1903 to 1913.

== See also ==
- List of Guyanese representative cricketers
