= Maurice Green (cricketer) =

Guyanese cricketer (1900–1952)

Personal information
- Full name: William Maurice Green
- Born: 19 March 1900; Demerara, British Guiana
- Died: 11 September 1952 (aged 52); British Guiana
- Source: Cricinfo, 19 November 2020

Maurice Green (19 March 1900 – 11 September 1952) was a Guyanese cricketer. He played in sixteen first-class matches for British Guiana from 1923 to 1938.

== See also ==
- List of Guyanese representative cricketers
