= Worrell Goddard =

Guyanese cricketer (1901–1974)

Personal information
- Born: 21 February 1901; Georgetown, British Guiana
- Died: 27 April 1974 (aged 73); Saint Michael, Barbados
- Source: Cricinfo, 19 November 2020

Worrell Goddard (21 February 1901 – 27 April 1974) was a Guyanese cricketer. He played in five first-class matches for British Guiana in 1925/26 and 1926/27.

== See also ==
- List of Guyanese representative cricketers
