= Victor Harnanan =

Guyanese cricketer (born 1939)

Personal information
- Born: 4 May 1939 (age 87); Berbice, British Guiana
- Source: Cricinfo, 19 November 2020

Victor Harnanan (born 4 May 1939) is a Guyanese cricketer. He played in four first-class matches for British Guiana from 1959 to 1964.

== See also ==
- List of Guyanese representative cricketers
