= Nigel Slinger =

Guyanese cricketer (born 1937)

Personal information
- Full name: Anthony Nigel Vere Slinger
- Born: 25 June 1937 (age 89); Georgetown, British Guiana
- Source: Cricinfo, 19 November 2020

Nigel Slinger (born 25 June 1937) is a former Guyanese cricketer. He played in three first-class matches for British Guiana and Trinidad and Tobago in 1958/59 and 1959/60.

Slinger was a right-arm medium-pace bowler. He worked as an insurance broker in Trinidad. In 1998 he was awarded the silver Hummingbird Medal for services to sport in Trinidad.

== See also ==
- List of Guyanese representative cricketers
