= Ravindranauth Seeram =

Guyanese cricketer (born 1961)

Personal information
- Born: 20 July 1961 (age 65); Demerara, British Guiana
- Source: Cricinfo, 19 November 2020

Ravindranauth Seeram (born 20 July 1961) is a Guyanese cricketer. He played in 41 first-class and 12 List A matches for Guyana from 1982 to 1992.

== See also ==
- List of Guyanese representative cricketers
