= Hugh Dyer (cricketer) =

Guyanese cricketer (1930–1977)

Personal information
- Born: 1 June 1930; Demerara, British Guiana
- Died: 16 April 1977 (aged 46); Guyana
- Source: Cricinfo, 19 November 2020

Hugh Dyer (1 June 1930 – 16 April 1977) was a Guyanese cricketer. He played in three first-class matches for British Guiana from 1951 to 1954.

== See also ==
- List of Guyanese representative cricketers
