= Patrick Garraway =

Guyanese cricketer (1883–1945)

Personal information
- Born: 21 November 1883; Berbice, British Guiana
- Died: 2 August 1945 (aged 61); British Guiana
- Source: Cricinfo, 19 November 2020

Patrick Garraway (21 November 1883 – 2 August 1945) was a Guyanese cricketer. He played in two first-class matches for British Guiana in 1905/06 and 1907/08.

Career stats

He played in two matches, scoring 59 runs. He had a batting average of 14.75 and a bowling average of 61.00

== See also ==
- List of Guyanese representative cricketers
