= Lenny Thomas =

Guyanese cricketer (1918–1973)

Personal information
- Born: 11 March 1918; Georgetown, British Guiana
- Died: 29 May 1973 (aged 55); Guyana
- Source: Cricinfo, 19 November 2020

Lenny Thomas (11 March 1918 – 29 May 1973) was a Guyanese cricketer. He played in thirteen first-class matches for British Guiana from 1936 to 1953.

== See also ==
- List of Guyanese representative cricketers
