= Leroy Jackman =

Guyanese cricketer (born 1931)

Personal information
- Born: 19 November 1931 (age 94); Demerara, British Guiana
- Source: Cricinfo, 19 November 2020

Leroy Jackman (born 19 November 1931) is a Guyanese cricketer. He played in two first-class matches for British Guiana in 1951/52.

== See also ==
- List of Guyanese representative cricketers
