= Vernon Chabrol =

Guyanese cricketer (1909–1968)

Personal information
- Born: 16 May 1909; Demerara, British Guiana
- Died: 24 July 1968 (aged 59); British Guiana
- Source: Cricinfo, 19 November 2020

Vernon Chabrol (16 May 1909 – 24 July 1968) was a Guyanese cricketer. He played in two first-class matches for British Guiana in 1929/30.

== See also ==
- List of Guyanese representative cricketers
