= Padwick Green =

Guyanese cricketer (1898–1941)

Personal information
- Born: 8 April 1898; Georgetown, British Guiana
- Died: 17 May 1941 (aged 43); British Guiana
- Source: Cricinfo, 19 November 2020

Padwick Green (8 April 1898 – 17 May 1941) was a Guyanese cricketer. He played in one first-class match for British Guiana in 1921/22.

== See also ==
- List of Guyanese representative cricketers
