= Azeemul Haniff =

Guyanese cricketer (born 1977)

Personal information
- Born: 24 October 1977 (age 49); Industry, East Coast Demara, Guyana
- Source: Cricinfo, 19 November 2020

Azeemul Haniff (born 24 October 1977) is a Guyanese cricketer.

== Career ==
He played in 51 first-class and 13 List A matches for Guyana from 1996 to 2007.

== See also ==
- List of Guyanese representative cricketers
