= William Brodie (cricketer) =

Guyanese cricketer

Personal information
- Born: 13 February 1878; Demerara, British Guiana
- Died: 11 July 1922 (aged 44); British Guiana
- Source: Cricinfo, 19 November 2020

William Brodie (13 February 1878 – 11 July 1922) was a cricketer. He played in one first-class match for British Guiana in 1901/02.

== See also ==
- List of Guyanese representative cricketers
