= Colin Wiltshire =

Guyanese cricketer and administrator (1935–2009)

Personal information
- Full name: Colin Francis Wiltshire
- Born: 3 October 1935; Georgetown, British Guiana
- Died: 18 December 2009 (aged 74); Trinidad
- Batting: Right-handed
- Role: Opening batsman

Domestic team information
- Years: Team
- 1958–1964: British Guiana
- Source: ESPNcricinfo, 22 May 2024

Colin Francis Wiltshire (3 October 1935 – 18 December 2009) was a Guyanese cricketer and sports administrator. He played in eight first-class matches for British Guiana from 1958 to 1964.

== Career and later life ==
Wiltshire was a right-handed opening batsman who played domestic cricket for the Demerara Cricket Club (DCC) and represented Demerara at the inter-county level. He was noted for his technical skill and "exquisite timing," particularly his execution of the on-drive.

He made his first-class debut in the 1958/59 Inter-colonial Tournament against Barbados. His most significant performance came in 1961 during the Pentangular Tournament at Bourda, where he scored a career-best 197 runs against the Combined Islands. During his career, he played alongside West Indian cricketers such as Clyde Walcott, Rohan Kanhai, and Lance Gibbs.

Following his playing career, Wiltshire became a prominent administrator, serving as the Secretary of the Guyana Cricket Board (GCB) for several years. Professionally, he was a Director and Company Secretary for Caribbean Containers Inc.

Wiltshire died of pneumonia in a hospital in Trinidad on 18 December 2009. His son, Garfield Wiltshire, was a three-time Southern Caribbean squash champion.

== See also ==
- List of Guyanese representative cricketers
