= Rohan Sarjoo =

Guyanese cricketer (born 1974)

Personal information
- Born: 13 November 1974 (age 51); Georgetown, Guyana
- Source: Cricinfo, 19 November 2020

Rohan Sarjoo (born 13 November 1974) is a Guyanese cricketer. He played in one first-class and one List A match for Guyana in 1996/97.

== See also ==
- List of Guyanese representative cricketers
