= Kevin Edwards (cricketer) =

Guyanese cricketer (born 1962)

Personal information
- Born: 18 June 1962 (age 64); Berbice, British Guiana
- Source: Cricinfo, 19 November 2020

Kevin Edwards (born 18 June 1962) is a Guyanese cricketer. He played in one List A and four first-class matches for Guyana in 1985/86 and 1986/87.

== See also ==
- List of Guyanese representative cricketers
