= Ganim Khan =

Guyanese cricketer (1931–1984)

Personal information
- Born: 6 July 1931; Berbice, British Guiana
- Died: 23 November 1984 (aged 53); Winnipeg, Manitoba, Canada
- Source: Cricinfo, 19 November 2020

Ganim Khan (6 July 1931 – 23 November 1984) was a Guyanese cricketer. He played in one first-class match for British Guiana in 1952–53.

== See also ==
- List of Guyanese representative cricketers
