= Charles Paul (cricketer) =

Guyanese cricketer (born 1933)

Personal information
- Born: 27 July 1933 (age 93); Berbice, British Guiana
- Source: Cricinfo, 19 November 2020

Charles Paul (born 27 July 1933) is a Guyanese cricketer. He played in two first-class matches for British Guiana in 1953/54 and 1954/55.

== See also ==
- List of Guyanese representative cricketers
