= Vijay Seonarine =

Guyanese cricketer (born 1979)

Personal information
- Born: 14 May 1979 (age 47); New Amsterdam, Guyana
- Source: Cricinfo, 19 November 2020

Vijay Seonarine (born 14 May 1979) is a Guyanese cricketer. He played in one List A match for Guyana in 1998/99.

== See also ==
- List of Guyanese representative cricketers
