= Ulric McKenzie =

Guyanese cricketer

Personal information
- Born: 15 June 1918; Georgetown, British Guiana
- Source: Cricinfo, 19 November 2020

Ulric McKenzie (born 15 June 1918, date of death unknown) was a Guyanese cricketer. He played in six first-class matches for British Guiana from 1938 to 1945.

== See also ==
- List of Guyanese representative cricketers
