= Robert Adonis =

British Guianese cricketer (born 1948)

Personal information
- Born: 16 March 1948 (age 78); Beterverwagting, Demerara, British Guiana
- Source: Cricinfo, 24 April 2017

Robert Adonis (born 16 March 1948) is a British Guianese cricketer. He played two first-class matches for Guyana between 1971 and 1975.

== See also ==
- List of Guyanese representative cricketers
