= Francis Shankland =

Guyanese cricketer (1910–1973)

Personal information
- Born: 1 September 1910; Berbice, British Guiana
- Died: 15 July 1973 (aged 62); Guyana
- Source: Cricinfo, 19 November 2020

Francis Shankland (1 September 1910 – 15 July 1973) was a Guyanese cricketer. He played in one first-class match for British Guiana in 1928/29.

== See also ==
- List of Guyanese representative cricketers
