= Sonny Moonsammy =

Guyanese cricketer (born 1935)

Personal information
- Born: 2 June 1935 (age 91); Berbice, Demerara
- Source: Cricinfo, 19 November 2020

Sonny Moonsammy (born 2 June 1935) is a Guyanese cricketer. He played in two first-class matches for British Guiana in 1958/59.

== See also ==
- List of Guyanese representative cricketers
