= Arnold Wight =

Guyanese cricketer (1926–2022)

Personal information
- Full name: Henry Arnold Wight
- Born: 22 April 1926; Georgetown, British Guiana
- Died: 12 January 2022 (aged 95); Stoney Creek, Ontario, Canada
- Source: Cricinfo, 19 November 2020

Henry Arnold Wight (22 April 1926 – 12 January 2022) was a Guyanese cricketer. He played in three first-class matches for British Guiana in 1946/47 and 1947/48.

Wight died in Stoney Creek, Ontario on 12 January 2022, at the age of 95.

== See also ==
- List of Guyanese representative cricketers
