= Jules Chabrol =

Guyanese cricketer

Personal information
- Born: 23 August 1881; Demerara, British Guiana
- Died: 4 January 1927 (aged 45); British Guiana
- Source: Cricinfo, 19 November 2020

Jules Chabrol (23 August 1881 – 4 January 1927) was a cricketer. He played in ten first-class matches for British Guiana from 1901 to 1925.

== See also ==
- List of Guyanese representative cricketers
