= Joseph Veerasawmy =

Guyanese cricketer

Personal information
- Born: 5 February 1889; Georgetown, British Guiana
- Died: 12 April 1947 (aged 58); British Guiana
- Source: Cricinfo, 19 November 2020

Joseph Veerasawmy (5 February 1889 – 12 April 1947) was ae cricketer from British Guiana. He played in three first-class matches for British Guiana from 1909 to 1923.

== See also ==
- List of Guyanese representative cricketers
