= Andrew Lyght (cricketer) =

Guyanese cricketer

Personal information
- Born: 21 July 1956; Georgetown, British Guiana
- Died: 16 April 2001 (aged 44); Georgetown, Guyana
- Source: Cricinfo, 31 December 2020

Andrew Augustus Lyght (21 July 1956 – 16 April 2001) was a Guyanese cricketer. He played in 38 first-class and 17 List A matches for Guyana and Demerara from 1976 to 1988.

== Career ==
He played for Guyana, Demerara and the West Indies under-19 teams. He appeared as a professional for Crook Town in English club cricket between 1983 and 1988. He was given the nickname "Monster" due to "his appetite for batting and how difficult it was to get him out".

Lyght was diagnosed with cancer of the lower abdomen in 1988 for which he received chemotherapy treatment. A few years later, it was discovered that the cancer had spread to other parts of his body. After various treatments in England, he returned to Guyana. He adopted a Rastafarian lifestyle in his battle against cancer. He succumbed to the disease in 2001.

== Legacy ==
In 2012, a commemorative game was played in Lyght's honor, as charity event organized by Friends of Former Guyana Cricketers. Proceeds of the event were given to Lyght's son Andrew Lyght Jr and his daughter Andrea.

In New York, A memorial cup was held in his honor 2017 and 2018. The teams of the New York District Metropolitan Cricket Association league, Atlantis Cricket Club and Sheffield Cricket Club share social ties to Demerara Cricket Club and Malteenoes Sports Club in Guyana.

Lyght's nephew, Christopher Barnwell, also plays for Guyana and the West Indies cricket team. Lyght's cousin William Whyte is an ex-Guyana all-rounder.

== See also ==
- List of Guyanese representative cricketers
