= Bajou Baijnauth =

Guyanese cricketer (1916–1985)

Personal information
- Born: 14 May 1916; Berbice, British Guiana
- Died: 7 April 1985 (aged 68); Berbice, Guyana
- Source: Cricinfo, 19 November 2020

Bajou Baijnauth (14 May 1916 – 7 April 1985) was a Guyanese cricketer. He played in seven first-class matches for British Guiana from 1946 to 1960.

== See also ==
- List of Guyanese representative cricketers
