= Sean Thompson (cricketer) =

Guyanese cricketer (born 1972)

Personal information
- Born: 5 September 1972 (age 54); Guyana
- Source: Cricinfo, 19 November 2020

Sean Thompson (born 5 September 1972) is a Guyanese cricketer. He played in one first-class match for Guyana in 1999/00.

== See also ==
- List of Guyanese representative cricketers
