= Ricardo Mohammed =

Guyanese cricketer (born 1978)

Personal information
- Born: 26 May 1978 (age 48); Essequibo, Guyana
- Source: Cricinfo, 19 November 2020

Ricardo Mohammed (born 26 May 1978) is a Guyanese cricketer. He played in one first-class and four List A matches for Guyana from 1998 to 2001.

== See also ==
- List of Guyanese representative cricketers
