= Carlwyn Reid =

Guyanese cricketer

Personal information
- Born: 12 May 1881; Georgetown, British Guiana
- Died: 15 July 1932 (aged 51); British Guiana
- Source: Cricinfo, 19 November 2020

Carlwyn Reid (12 May 1881 – 15 July 1932) was a cricketer. He played in six first-class matches for British Guiana from 1903 to 1911.

== See also ==
- List of Guyanese representative cricketers
