= Emmett Thompson =

Guyanese cricketer

Personal information
- Born: 1881; British Guiana
- Died: Unknown
- Source: Cricinfo, 19 November 2020

Emmett Thompson (born 1881, date of death unknown) was a Guyanese cricketer. He played in two first-class matches for British Guiana in 1903/04 and 1908/09.

== See also ==
- List of Guyanese representative cricketers
