= Zaheer Haniff =

Guyanese cricketer (born 1974)

Personal information
- Born: 13 April 1974 (age 52); Perth, Essequibo, Guyana
- Source: Cricinfo, 19 November 2020

Zaheer Haniff (born 13 April 1974) is a Guyanese cricketer. He played in eleven first-class and two List A matches for Guyana from 1994 to 2000.

== See also ==
- List of Guyanese representative cricketers
