= Rawle Benjamin =

Guyanese cricketer (born 1932)

Personal information
- Born: 8 January 1932; Demerara, British Guiana
- Source: Cricinfo, 19 November 2020

Rawle Benjamin (born 8 January 1932) is a Guyanese cricketer. He played in one first-class match for British Guiana in 1953/54.

== See also ==
- List of Guyanese representative cricketers
