= Sunny Basdeo =

Guyanese cricketer (born 1931)

Personal information
- Born: 2 September 1931 (age 95); Berbice, British Guiana
- Source: Cricinfo, 19 November 2020

Sunny Basdeo (born 2 September 1931) is a Guyanese cricketer. He played in one first-class match for British Guiana in 1953/54.

== See also ==
- List of Guyanese representative cricketers
