= Ernest Christiani =

Guyanese cricketer (1915–1961)

Personal information
- Born: 16 April 1915; Georgetown, British Guiana
- Died: 19 March 1961 (aged 45); British Guiana
- Source: Cricinfo, 19 November 2020

Ernest Christiani (16 April 1915 – 19 March 1961) was a Guyanese cricketer. He played in five first-class matches for British Guiana from 1935 to 1947.

== See also ==
- List of Guyanese representative cricketers
