= Azib Ally-Haniff =

Guyanese cricketer (born 1978)

Personal information
- Born: 8 November 1978 (age 48); Port Mourant, Guyana
- Source: Cricinfo, 19 November 2020

Azib Ally-Haniff (born 8 November 1978) is a Guyanese cricketer. He played in eleven first-class matches for Guyana from 1998 to 2002. After retiring from playing cricket himself, he coached for Ontario Cricket's women's team and helped select players for the men's and youth teams.

== See also ==
- List of Guyanese representative cricketers
