= Jonathan Nurse (cricketer) =

Guyanese cricketer

Personal information
- Born: 21 April 1885; Demerara, British Guiana
- Source: Cricinfo, 19 November 2020

Jonathan Nurse (born 21 April 1885, date of death unknown) was a Guyanese cricketer. He played in four first-class matches for British Guiana from 1909 to 1922.

== See also ==
- List of Guyanese representative cricketers
