= Rudolph Doodnauth =

Guyanese cricketer (born 1947)

Personal information
- Full name: Rudolph Henry Doodnauth
- Born: 7 June 1947 (age 79); Berbice, British Guiana
- Source: Cricinfo, 19 November 2020

Rudolph Doodnauth (born 7 June 1947) is a Guyanese cricketer. He played in five first-class matches for Guyana from 1972 to 1988.

== See also ==
- List of Guyanese representative cricketers
