= Elliot Pilgrim =

Guyanese cricketer

Personal information
- Born: 19 January 1886; Berbice, British Guiana
- Died: 22 December 1970 (aged 84); Guyana
- Source: Cricinfo, 19 November 2020

Elliot Pilgrim (19 January 1886 – 22 December 1970) was a cricketer from British Guiana. He played in three first-class matches for British Guiana in 1909/10.

== See also ==
- List of Guyanese representative cricketers
