= David Hill (cricketer) =

Guyanese cricketer (1915–1974)

Personal information
- Born: 12 August 1915; Demerara, British Guiana
- Died: 1 June 1974 (aged 58); Guyana
- Source: Cricinfo, 19 November 2020

David Hill (12 August 1915 – 1 June 1974) was a Guyanese cricketer. He played in ten first-class matches for British Guiana from 1937 to 1953.

== See also ==
- List of Guyanese representative cricketers
