= Stephen Latcha =

Guyanese cricketer (born 1989)

Personal information
- Born: 29 December 1989 (age 36); New Amsterdam, Guyana
- Source: Cricinfo, 19 November 2020

Stephen Latcha (born 29 December 1989) is a Guyanese cricketer. He played in three List A matches for Guyana in 2011.

== See also ==
- List of Guyanese representative cricketers
