= Norman Wight =

Guyanese cricketer (1928–2016)

Personal information
- Born: 28 May 1928; Georgetown, British Guiana
- Died: 23 January 2016 (aged 87); Casselberry, Florida, United States
- Source: Cricinfo, 19 November 2020

Norman Wight (26 May 1928 – 23 January 2016) was a Guyanese cricketer. He played in twenty-three first-class matches for British Guiana from 1946 to 1960.

== See also ==
- List of Guyanese representative cricketers
