= Andrew Gomes =

Guyanese cricketer (1887–1967)

Personal information
- Born: 23 June 1887; East Bank, Demerara
- Died: 4 July 1967 (aged 80); Guyana
- Source: Cricinfo, 19 November 2020

Andrew Gomes (23 June 1887 – 4 July 1967) was a Guyanese cricketer. He played in three first-class matches for British Guiana from 1912 to 1924.

== See also ==
- List of Guyanese representative cricketers
