= Aubrey Bishop =

Guyanese cricketer (1931–2013)

Personal information
- Born: 21 August 1931; Georgetown, British Guiana
- Died: 6 February 2013 (aged 81)
- Source: Cricinfo, 19 November 2020

Aubrey Bishop (21 August 1931 – 6 February 2013) was a Guyanese cricketer. He played in two first-class matches for British Guiana in 1952/53. Bishop died on 6 February 2013, at the age of 81.

== See also ==
- List of Guyanese representative cricketers
