= Raun Johnson =

Guyanese cricketer (born 1991)

Personal information
- Born: 1991 (age 34–35); West Berbic, Guyana
- Source: Cricinfo, 19 November 2020

Raun Johnson (born 1991) is a Guyanese cricketer. He played in two first-class matches for Guyana in 2014.

== See also ==
- List of Guyanese representative cricketers
