= Vibert Rodney =

Guyanese cricketer (born 1932)

Personal information
- Born: 30 January 1932 (age 94); Georgetown, British Guiana
- Source: Cricinfo, 19 November 2020

Vibert Rodney (born 30 January 1932) is a Guyanese cricketer. He played in one first-class match for British Guiana in 1952/53.

== See also ==
- List of Guyanese representative cricketers
