= Geoffrey Lord =

Guyanese cricketer

Personal information
- Born: 17 February 1921; Demerara, British Guiana
- Source: Cricinfo, 19 November 2020

Geoffrey Lord (born 17 February 1921, date of death unknown) was a Guyanese cricketer. He played in one first-class match for British Guiana in 1944/45.

== See also ==
- List of Guyanese representative cricketers
