= Ronald Hunte =

Guyanese cricketer

Personal information
- Born: 5 November 1883; Demerara, British Guiana
- Source: Cricinfo, 19 November 2020

Ronald Lionrel Hunte (born 5 November 1883, date of death unknown) was a Guyanese cricketer. He played in twelve first-class matches for British Guiana from 1908 to 1930.

== See also ==
- List of Guyanese representative cricketers
