= Jeremy McKenzie =

Guyanese cricketer

Personal information
- Born: 23 April 1905; Georgetown, British Guiana
- Source: Cricinfo, 19 November 2020

Jeremy McKenzie (born 23 April 1905, date of death unknown) was a Guyanese cricketer. He played in four first-class matches for British Guiana in 1928/29 and 1929/30.

== See also ==
- List of Guyanese representative cricketers
