= Vivian Tyrell =

Guyanese cricketer

Personal information
- Born: 23 July 1923; Georgetown, British Guiana
- Source: Cricinfo, 19 November 2020

Vivian Tyrell (born 21 July 1923, date of death unknown) was a Guyanese cricketer. He played in one first-class match for British Guiana in 1945/46.

== See also ==
- List of Guyanese representative cricketers
