= Vibert Durjan =

Guyanese cricketer (born 1948)

Personal information
- Born: 31 July 1948 (age 78); Georgetown, British Guiana
- Source: Cricinfo, 19 November 2020

Vibert Durjan (born 31 July 1948) is a Guyanese cricketer. He played in one first-class match for British Guiana in 1968/69.

== See also ==
- List of Guyanese representative cricketers
