= Claude St John =

Guyanese cricketer (born 1951)

Personal information
- Born: 4 February 1951 (age 75); Demerara, British Guiana
- Source: Cricinfo, 19 November 2020

Claude St John (born 4 February 1951) is a Guyanese cricketer. He played in seven first-class matches for British Guiana from 1968 to 1975.

== See also ==
- List of Guyanese representative cricketers
