= Trevon Garraway =

Guyanese cricketer (born 1984)

Personal information
- Born: 11 January 1984 (age 42); Pomeroon-Supenaam, Guyana
- Source: Cricinfo, 19 November 2020

Trevon Garraway (born 11 January 1984) is a Guyanese cricketer. He played in one List A and twelve first-class matches for Guyana from 2005 to 2009.

== See also ==
- List of Guyanese representative cricketers
