= Cecil Thomas (cricketer) =

Guyanese cricketer (1926–1996)

Personal information
- Born: 9 September 1926; Georgetown, British Guiana
- Died: 1 September 1996 (aged 69); Georgetown, Guyana
- Source: Cricinfo, 19 November 2020

Cecil Thomas (9 September 1926 – 1 September 1996) was a Guyanese cricketer, cricket administrator, and radio personality who hosted a programme called Sports Action Line. He played in thirteen first-class matches for British Guiana from 1946 to 1957.

== See also ==
- List of Guyanese representative cricketers
