= Devon McLean =

Guyanese cricketer (1904–1967)

Personal information
- Born: 18 November 1904; Berbice, British Guiana
- Died: 1 May 1967 (aged 62); Guyana
- Source: Cricinfo, 19 November 2020

Devon McLean (18 November 1904 – 1 May 1967) was a Guyanese cricketer. He played in three first-class matches for British Guiana from 1924 to 1927.

== See also ==
- List of Guyanese representative cricketers
