= Arthur Austin (cricketer) =

Guyanese cricketer (1873–1962)

Personal information
- Born: 2 August 1873; Saint George, Barbados
- Died: 1 February 1962 (aged 88); Reading, England
- Source: Cricinfo, 19 November 2020

Arthur Austin (2 August 1873 – 1 February 1962) was a Guyanese cricketer. He played in four first-class matches for British Guiana in 1894/95 and 1895/96.

== See also ==
- List of Guyanese representative cricketers
