= Henry Vyfhuis =

Guyanese cricketer

Personal information
- Born: 1 July 1876; Demerara, British Guiana
- Source: Cricinfo, 19 November 2020

Henry Vyfhuis (born 1 July 1876, date of death unknown) was a cricketer from British Guiana. He played in ten first-class matches for British Guiana from 1896 to 1911.

== See also ==
- List of Guyanese representative cricketers
