= Homchand Pooran =

Guyanese cricketer (born 1979)

Personal information
- Born: 14 February 1979 (age 47); Berbice, Guyana
- Source: Cricinfo, 19 November 2020

Homchand Pooran (born 14 February 1979) is a Guyanese cricketer. He played in eleven first-class matches for Guyana from 1998 to 2009.

== See also ==
- List of Guyanese representative cricketers
