= Chatrapaul Singh =

Guyanese cricketer (born 1954)

Personal information
- Born: 29 April 1954 (age 72); Berbice, British Guiana
- Source: Cricinfo, 19 November 2020

Chatrapaul Singh (born 29 April 1954) is a Guyanese cricketer. He played in two first-class matches for Guyana in 1978/79.

== See also ==
- List of Guyanese representative cricketers
