= Vibart Johashen =

Guyanese cricketer (born 1946)

Personal information
- Born: 17 August 1946 (age 80); Georgetown, British Guiana
- Source: Cricinfo, 19 November 2020

Vibart Johashen (born 17 August 1946) is a Guyanese cricketer. He played in one List A and nine first-class matches for Guyana from 1973 to 1979.

== See also ==
- List of Guyanese representative cricketers
