= Nolan McKenzie =

Guyanese cricketer (born 1969)

Personal information
- Born: 10 May 1969 (age 57); Georgetown, Guyana
- Source: Cricinfo, 19 November 2020

Nolan McKenzie (born 10 May 1969) is a Guyanese cricketer. He played in 19 first-class and 14 List A matches for Guyana from 1988 to 1996.

== See also ==
- List of Guyanese representative cricketers
