= Leonard McRae =

Guyanese cricketer (born 1947)

Personal information
- Born: 13 September 1947 (age 79); Georgetown, Guyana
- Source: Cricinfo, 19 November 2020

Leonard McRae (born 13 September 1947) is a Guyanese cricketer. He played in ten first-class matches for Guyana from 1970 to 1978.

== See also ==
- List of Guyanese representative cricketers
