= Delbert Hicks =

Guyanese cricketer (born 1983)

Personal information
- Born: 11 November 1983 (age 43); New Amsterdam, Guyana
- Source: Cricinfo, 19 November 2020

Delbert Hicks (born 11 November 1983) is a Guyanese cricketer. He played in one first-class and four List A matches for Guyana in 2009.

== See also ==
- List of Guyanese representative cricketers
