= Calvin Belgrave =

Guyanese cricketer (born 1970)

Personal information
- Born: 2 November 1970 (age 56); Demerara, Guyana
- Source: Cricinfo, 19 November 2020

Calvin Belgrave (born 2 November 1970) is a Guyanese cricketer. He played in seven first-class and nine List A matches for Guyana from 1989 to 1994.

== See also ==
- List of Guyanese representative cricketers
