= Joseph Simpson (cricketer) =

Guyanese cricketer (born 1958)

Personal information
- Born: 19 May 1958 (age 68); Georgetown, British Guiana
- Source: Cricinfo, 19 November 2020

Joseph Simpson (born 19 May 1958) is a Guyanese cricketer. He played in one List A and four first-class matches for Guyana in 1986/87 and 1987/88.

== See also ==
- List of Guyanese representative cricketers
