= Pat Legall =

Guyanese cricketer (1934–2004)

Personal information
- Born: 9 February 1934; Georgetown, British Guiana
- Died: 8 July 2004 (aged 70); Brooklyn, New York, United States
- Source: Cricinfo, 19 November 2020

Pat Legall (9 February 1934 – 8 July 2004) was a Guyanese cricketer. He played in eleven first-class matches for British Guiana from 1954 to 1963.

== See also ==
- List of Guyanese representative cricketers
