= Vincent Adams =

Guyanese cricketer and engineer

- Born: 26 January 1950 (age 76); Good Intent, British Guiana
- Education: University of Guyana (B.S.); University of Tennessee (Ph.D.)
- Known for: Environmental cleanup of the U.S. nuclear weapons complex Deactivation and decommissioning of the K-25 Gaseous Diffusion Plant
- Cricket career

Cricket information
- Batting: Opening batsman

Vincent Adams (born 26 January 1950) is a retired Guyanese-American environmental engineer. He was a senior manager at the United States Department of Energy until his retirement in 2016, and subsequently served as head of the Guyana Environmental Protection Agency from 2018 to 2020. Before immigrating to the United States he played first-class cricket for Guyana.

== Early life and education ==
Adams was born on 26 January 1950 in Good Intent, British Guiana.

Adams was one of the first civil engineering graduates from the University of Guyana. After moving to the United States he completed master's degrees in hydrogeology and petroleum and geological engineering, followed by a doctorate in environmental engineering at the University of Tennessee.

== Sporting activities ==
He made his first-class cricket debut for Guyana in 1969 at the age of 19. He played five matches as an opening batsman, with a highest score of 121. His cricket career was cut short by a car accident.

In 2016, Adams was appointed by the International Cricket Council (ICC) to a new national advisory group created to advise on the growth and development of cricket in the United States. Following the ICC's expulsion of the United States of America Cricket Association (USACA) in 2017, he was involved with the creation of a new body, USA Cricket, which was readmitted to ICC membership. He was appointed to the USA Cricket Committee in August 2020.

== Career ==
Adams joined the United States Department of Energy (DOE) in 1986, working in West Texas as a hydrogeologist with the Office of Civilian Radioactive Waste Management. After two years, he joined the Formerly Utilized Sites Remedial Action Program in Tennessee as an environmental engineer. He later had a longstanding involvement with the DOE's Office of Environmental Management, notably serving as director of deactivation and decommissioning for the K-25 plant at Oak Ridge.

In 2007, Adams became director of DOE's Groundwater and Soils Office. He oversaw the billion-dollar Recovery Act program at the Savannah River Site and later had responsibility for the Paducah and Portsmouth Gaseous Diffusion Plants. He retired from the department in December 2016.

In 2018, Adams was appointed head of the Guyana Environmental Protection Agency. In August 2020, while he was leading the review of the field development plan for ExxonMobil's Payara oil field, he was placed on leave effective immediately. In November, he was fired from his role.

== See also ==
- List of Guyanese representative cricketers
