= Marvin Turpin =

Guyanese cricketer

Personal information
- Born: 1 November 1885; Georgetown, British Guiana
- Source: Cricinfo, 19 November 2020

Marvin Turpin (born 1 November 1885, date of death unknown) was a Guyanese cricketer. He played in three first-class matches for British Guiana in 1908/09 and 1909/10.

== See also ==
- List of Guyanese representative cricketers
