= Henry Brebner =

Guyanese cricketer

Personal information
- Born: 7 December 1883; Springlands, British Guiana
- Died: 14 January 1930 (aged 46); British Guiana
- Source: Cricinfo, 19 November 2020

Henry Brebner (7 December 1883 – 14 January 1930) was a cricketer. He played in one first-class match for British Guiana in 1903/04.

== See also ==
- List of Guyanese representative cricketers
