= Indal Persaud =

Guyanese cricketer (1940–1994)

Personal information
- Born: 10 January 1940; Berbice, British Guiana
- Died: 1 December 1994 (aged 54); Guyana
- Source: Cricinfo, 19 November 2020

Indal Persaud (10 January 1940 – 1 December 1994) was a Guyanese cricketer. He played in four first-class matches for British Guiana from 1960 to 1965.

== See also ==
- List of Guyanese representative cricketers
