= Naresh Manbodhe =

Guyanese cricketer (born 1972)

Personal information
- Full name: Naresh Kumar Manbodhe
- Born: 15 July 1972 (age 54); Berbice, Guyana
- Source: Cricinfo, 19 November 2020

Naresh Manbodhe (born 15 July 1972) is a Guyanese cricketer. He played in three first-class matches for Guyana in 1994/95 and 1995/96.

== See also ==
- List of Guyanese representative cricketers
