= Joshua Cromwell =

Guyanese cricketer

Personal information
- Born: 19 July 1887; Demerara, British Guiana
- Died: 28 September 1949 (aged 62); British Guiana
- Source: Cricinfo, 19 November 2020

Joshua Cromwell (19 July 1887 – 28 September 1949) was a cricketer. He played in two first-class matches for British Guiana in 1907/08 and 1912/13.

== See also ==
- List of Guyanese representative cricketers
