= Colin d'Ornellas =

Guyanese cricketer

Personal information
- Born: 2 May 1889; Demerara, British Guiana
- Died: 17 June 1934 (aged 45); British Guiana
- Source: Cricinfo, 19 November 2020

Colin d'Ornellas (2 May 1889 – 17 June 1934) was a cricketer from British Guiana. He played in five first-class matches for British Guiana from 1909 to 1912.

== See also ==
- List of Guyanese representative cricketers
