= Bill de Freitas =

Guyanese cricketer (1923–1978)

Personal information
- Born: 19 September 1923; Essequibo, British Guiana
- Died: 11 May 1978 (aged 54); Guyana
- Source: Cricinfo, 19 November 2020

Bill de Freitas (19 September 1923 – 11 May 1978) was a Guyanese cricketer. He played in one first-class match for British Guiana in 1943/44.

== See also ==
- List of Guyanese representative cricketers
