= Saul Busby =

Guyanese cricketer (1875–1932)

Personal information
- Born: 14 June 1875; Berbice, British Guiana
- Died: 8 November 1932 (aged 57); British Guiana
- Source: Cricinfo, 19 November 2020

Saul Busby (14 June 1875 – 8 November 1932) was a Guyanese cricketer. He played in three first-class matches for British Guiana from 1897 to 1900.

== See also ==
- List of Guyanese representative cricketers
