= Richard Hector =

Guyanese cricketer (born 1931)

Personal information
- Born: 16 May 1931 (age 95); Queenstown, British Guiana
- Source: Cricinfo, 19 November 2020

Richard Hector (born 16 May 1931) is a Guyanese cricketer. He played in two first-class matches for British Guiana in 1953/54 and 1954/55.

== See also ==
- List of Guyanese representative cricketers
