= Harold Fraser (cricketer) =

Guyanese cricketer (1915–1993)

Personal information
- Born: 4 July 1915; East Bank, Demerara
- Died: 3 July 1993 (aged 77); Port of Spain, Trinidad
- Source: Cricinfo, 19 November 2020

Harold Fraser (4 July 1915 – 3 July 1993) was a Guyanese cricketer. He played in six first-class matches for British Guiana in 1937/38 and 1938/39.

== See also ==
- List of Guyanese representative cricketers
