= Newman Cox =

Guyanese cricketer (1867–1938)

Personal information
- Born: 13 March 1867; Demerara, British Guiana
- Died: 2 January 1938 (aged 70); British Guiana
- Source: Cricinfo, 19 November 2020

Newman Cox (13 March 1867 – 2 January 1938) was a Guyanese cricketer. He played in seven first-class matches for British Guiana from 1887 to 1896.

== See also ==
- List of Guyanese representative cricketers
