= Keith Glasgow =

Guyanese cricketer (1949–1999)

Personal information
- Born: 26 January 1949; Demerara, British Guiana
- Died: 17 September 1999 (aged 50)
- Source: Cricinfo, 19 November 2020

Keith Glasgow (26 January 1949 – 17 September 1999) was a Guyanese cricketer. He played in twelve first-class and two List A matches for Guyana from 1970 to 1977.

== See also ==
- List of Guyanese representative cricketers
