= William White (Guyanese cricketer) =

Guyanese cricketer (born 1953)

Personal information
- Born: 30 October 1953 (age 73); Georgetown, British Guiana
- Source: Cricinfo, 19 November 2020

William White (born 30 October 1953) is a Guyanese cricketer. He played in twelve first-class and eight List A matches for Guyana from 1976 to 1985.

White began playing cricket in the late 1960s at the YMCA. He was scouted for the Demerara cricket team as well as Guyana's under-19 in 1971 and 72. He played for Sheldon Cricket Club (England) in 1983 and Pembroke Cricket Club in 1984. He earned 5 wicked and 30 runs in his final game for Guyana, earning him a 'man-of-the-match' award.

Upon emigrating to the US in 1985, he joined the Atlantis Cricket Club in New York, where he earned an honorary lifetime membership in 2014 for his nearly 25 years of service.

White's brother in-law is Clive Lloyd.

== See also ==
- List of Guyanese representative cricketers
