= Paul Ouckram =

Guyanese cricketer (1889–1937)

Personal information
- Born: 23 March 1889; Demerara, British Guiana
- Died: 16 March 1937 (aged 47); British Guiana
- Source: Cricinfo, 19 November 2020

Paul Ouckram (23 March 1889 – 16 March 1937) was a Guyanese cricketer. He played in four first-class matches for British Guiana from 1909 to 1925.

== See also ==
- List of Guyanese representative cricketers
