= Bill Westmaas =

Guyanese cricketer (1923–2011)

Leonard Westmaas
Personal information
- Full name: Leonard Adrian Westmaas
- Born: 28 May 1923; Georgetown, British Guiana
- Died: 25 August 2011 (aged 88); Toronto, Ontario, Canada
- Nickname: Bill
- Batting: Right-handed

Domestic team information
- Years: Team
- 1945-46 to 1947-48: British Guiana

Career statistics
| Competition | First-class |
|---|---|
| Matches | 8 |
| Runs scored | 456 |
| Batting average | 28.50 |
| 100s/50s | 1/1 |
| Top score | 111 |
| Balls bowled | 2 |
| Wickets | 1 |
| Bowling average | 1.00 |
| 5 wickets in innings | 0 |
| 10 wickets in match | 0 |
| Best bowling | 1/1 |
| Catches/stumpings | 5/– |
- Source: Cricinfo, 24 November 2020

Leonard Adrian "Bill" Westmaas (28 May 1923 – 25 August 2011) was a Guyanese cricketer. He played in eight first-class matches for British Guiana from 1945 to 1948.

Westmaas was one of eight brothers who attended Queen's College, Guyana. An opening batsman, his highest score for British Guiana was 111 against Trinidad in 1946–47.

In the 1960s he was the office manager at the Albion Sugar Estate in Berbice. He and his wife Trixie had two daughters and a son.

== See also ==
- List of Guyanese representative cricketers
