= Vernon Dias =

Guyanese cricketer (1900–1963)

Personal information
- Born: 11 January 1900; Demerara, British Guiana
- Died: 14 January 1963 (aged 63); British Guiana
- Source: Cricinfo, 19 November 2020

Vernon Dias (11 January 1900 – 14 January 1963) was a Guyanese cricketer. He played in five first-class matches for British Guiana from 1922 to 1926.

== See also ==
- List of Guyanese representative cricketers
