= Garvin Nedd =

Guyanese cricketer (born 1972)

Personal information
- Born: 21 July 1972 (age 54); Georgetown, Guyana
- Source: Cricinfo, 19 November 2020

Garvin Nedd (born 21 July 1972) is a Guyanese cricketer. He played in fourteen first-class matches for Guyana from 1994 to 2000.

== See also ==
- List of Guyanese representative cricketers
