= Merril Anthony =

Guyanese cricketer (1909–1967)

Personal information
- Born: 16 November 1909; Zes Kinderen, British Guiana
- Died: 18 May 1967 (aged 57); Guyana
- Source: Cricinfo, 19 November 2020

Merril Anthony (16 November 1909 – 18 May 1967) was a Guyanese cricketer. He played in one first-class match for British Guiana in 1929/30.

== See also ==
- List of Guyanese representative cricketers
