= Richard Ramdeen =

Guyanese cricketer (born 1988)

Personal information
- Full name: Richard Nixon Ramdeen
- Born: 16 February 1988 (age 38); Berbice, Guyana
- Source: Cricinfo, 19 November 2020

Richard Ramdeen (born 16 February 1988) is a Guyanese cricketer. He played in one first-class, three List A, and two Twenty20 matches for Guyana in 2010 and 2011.

== See also ==
- List of Guyanese representative cricketers
