= Jerry Angus =

Guyanese cricketer (born 1960)

Personal information
- Born: 12 May 1960 (age 66); New Amsterdam, British Guiana
- Source: Cricinfo, 19 November 2020

Jerry Angus (born 12 May 1960) is a Guyanese cricketer. He played in fourteen first-class and three List A matches for Guyana and Berbice from 1979 to 1990.

== See also ==
- List of Guyanese representative cricketers
