= Paul Persaud =

Guyanese cricketer (born 1971)

Personal information
- Born: 19 August 1971 (age 55); Georgetown, Guyana
- Source: Cricinfo, 19 November 2020

Paul Persaud (born 19 August 1971) is a Guyanese cricketer. He played in seventeen first-class and eleven List A matches for Guyana from 1990 to 1995.

== See also ==
- List of Guyanese representative cricketers
