= Glenn Robinson (disambiguation) =

Glenn Robinson (born 1973) is an American former basketball player.

Glenn Robinson may also refer to:

- Glenn Robinson (coach) (born 1944), American college basketball coach
- Glenn Robinson (American football) (born 1951), American football player
- Glenn Robinson III (born 1994), American professional basketball player

== See also ==
- Glen Robinson (disambiguation)
