= Saranga Baichu =

Guyanese cricketer (born 1938)

Personal information
- Born: 11 July 1938 (age 88); Berbice, British Guiana
- Source: Cricinfo, 19 November 2020

Saranga Baichu (born 11 July 1938) is a Guyanese cricketer. He played in two first-class matches for British Guiana in 1958/59.

== See also ==
- List of Guyanese representative cricketers
