= Mark Burnett (cricketer) =

Guyanese cricketer (born 1970)

Personal information
- Born: 12 November 1970 (age 56); Demerara, Guyana
- Source: Cricinfo, 19 November 2020

Mark Burnett (born 12 November 1970) is a Guyanese cricketer. He played in one first-class and four List A matches for Guyana in 1992/93 and 1993/94.

== See also ==
- List of Guyanese representative cricketers
