= Sydney Seaforth =

Guyanese cricketer (born 1933)

Personal information
- Born: 7 November 1933 (age 93); Demerara, British Guiana
- Source: Cricinfo, 19 November 2020

Sydney Seaforth (born 7 November 1933) is a Guyanese cricketer. He played in three first-class matches for British Guiana from 1951 to 1954.

== See also ==
- List of Guyanese representative cricketers
