= Timur Mohamed =

Guyanese cricketer

Personal information
- Full name: Timur Mohamed
- Born: 7 June 1957 (age 69); Georgetown, Demerara, Guyana
- Batting: Left-handed
- Bowling: Leg break
- Relatives: Edwin Mohamed (father)

Domestic team information
- Years: Team
- 1980: Minor Counties
- 1979–1981: Suffolk
- 1978/79–1984/85: Demerara
- 1975/76–1986/87: Guyana

Career statistics
Competition	First-class	List A
Matches	47	30
Runs scored	2,526	868
Batting average	36.08	29.93
100s/50s	5/11	2/4
Top score	200*	104
Balls bowled	145	9
Wickets	2	–
Bowling average	49.00	–
5 wickets in innings	–	–
10 wickets in match	–	–
Best bowling	1/16	–
Catches/stumpings	21/–	7/–
- Source: Cricinfo, 27 July 2011

Timur Mohamed (born 7 June 1957) is a former Guyanese cricketer. Mohamed was a left-handed batsman who bowled leg break. He was born in Georgetown, Guyana.

Mohamed initially played Youth Test matches and One Day International's for West Indies Young Cricketers, who he also captained. Mohamed made his first-class debut for Guyana against a Combined Leeward and Windward Islands team in 1976. He made 35 further first-class appearances for Guyana, the last of which came against the Leeward Islands in 1986/87 Shell Shield. In his 36 first-class matches for Guyana, he scored 1,999 runs at an average of 38.44, with a high score of 200 not out. He made 11 fifties and 5 centuries, with his highest score coming against the Windward Islands in the 1985/86 Shell Shield. He also played a handful of first-class matches for Demerara, a Shell Shield XI, West Indies Board President's XI, Young West Indies and the West Indians. His only first-class appearance for the West Indians came against Warwickshire on the West Indies 1980 tour of England.

Mohamed made his List A debut for Guyana against Barbados in the 1978/79 Geddes Grant/Harrison Line Trophy. He made 16 further List A appearances for Guyana, the last of which came against Barbados in the 1986/87 Geddes Grant/Harrison Line Trophy. In his 17 List A matches for Guyana, he scored 385 runs at an average of 24.06, with a high score of 104. This score came against Jamaica in the 1979/80 Geddes Grant/Harrison Line Trophy. He also played 6 List A matches for Young West Indies during their 1981 and 1983 tours of Zimbabwe. He scored 263 runs at an average of 43.83, with a high score of 102. This score came against Zimbabwe on the 1983 tour.

Mohamed also played county cricket in England for Suffolk, making his debut for the county in the 1979 Minor Counties Championship against Hertfordshire. He played Minor counties cricket for Suffolk from 1979 to 1981, making 18 Minor Counties Championship matches. He made his first List A appearance for Suffolk against Buckinghamshire in the 1979 Gillette Cup. He made 2 further List A appearances for the county, against Sussex in the 2nd round of the same competition, and against the same opposition in the 1980 Gillette Cup. In his three List A matches for Suffolk, he scored 108 runs at an average of 36.00, with a high score of 85. This score came against Sussex in the 1980 Gillette Cup. Playing for Suffolk allowed him to represent the Minor Counties cricket team, who he appeared for in 4 List A matches in the 1980 Benson & Hedges Cup. In his four matches for the team, Mohamed scored 112 runs at an average of 28.00, with a high score of 63. This score came against Glamorgan.

His father, Edwin, played first-class cricket for British Guiana and later for the same team when it became Guyana.
