= Douglas Smith (Guyanese cricketer) =

Guyanese cricketer

Personal information
- Born: 1884
- Died: Unknown
- Source: Cricinfo, 19 November 2020

Douglas Smith (born 1884, date of death unknown) was a Guyanese cricketer. He played in two first-class matches for British Guiana in 1912/13.

== See also ==
- List of Guyanese representative cricketers
