= Ian Jordan =

Guyanese cricketer (1927–1993)

Personal information
- Born: 19 June 1927; Georgetown, British Guiana
- Died: 1993 (aged 65–66); Georgetown, Guyana
- Source: Cricinfo, 19 November 2020

Ian Jordan (19 June 1927 – 1993) was a Guyanese cricketer. He played in five first-class matches for British Guiana from 1947 to 1958.

== See also ==
- List of Guyanese representative cricketers
