= Johnny Naipaul =

Guyanese cricketer (1927–1983)

Personal information
- Born: 28 December 1927; Berbice, British Guiana
- Died: 5 February 1983 (aged 55)
- Source: Cricinfo, 19 November 2020

Johnny Naipaul (28 December 1927 – 5 February 1983) was a Guyanese cricketer. He played in one first-class match for British Guiana in 1944/45.

== See also ==
- List of Guyanese representative cricketers
