= Elmer Phillips =

Guyanese cricketer (1901–1956)

Personal information
- Born: 11 October 1901; Georgetown, British Guiana
- Died: 3 July 1956 (aged 54); British Guiana
- Source: Cricinfo, 19 November 2020

Elmer Phillips (11 October 1901 – 3 July 1956) was a Guyanese cricketer. He played in eight first-class matches for British Guiana from 1921 to 1927.

== See also ==
- List of Guyanese representative cricketers
