= Mark Grenville =

Guyanese cricketer (born 1963)

Personal information
- Born: 30 April 1963 (age 63); Georgetown, British Guiana
- Source: Cricinfo, 19 November 2020

Mark Grenville (born 30 April 1963) is a Guyanese cricketer. He played in four first-class matches for Guyana from 1984 to 1987.

== See also ==
- List of Guyanese representative cricketers
