= Colwin Cort =

Guyanese cricketer (born 1967)

Personal information
- Born: 19 September 1967 (age 59); Essequibo, Guyana
- Source: Cricinfo, 19 November 2020

Colwin Cort (born 19 September 1967) is a Guyanese cricketer. He played in two List A and two first-class matches for Guyana from 1990 to 1994.

== See also ==
- List of Guyanese representative cricketers
