= Rajiv Ivan =

Guyanese cricketer (born 1986)

Personal information
- Born: 4 September 1986 (age 40); Tain, Berbice
- Source: Cricinfo, 19 November 2020

Rajiv Ivan (born 4 September 1986) is a Guyanese cricketer. He played in two List A matches for Guyana in 2013.

== See also ==
- List of Guyanese representative cricketers
