= Troy Cornelius =

Guyanese cricketer (born 1983)

Personal information
- Born: 28 January 1983 (age 43); Essequibo, Guyana
- Source: Cricinfo, 19 November 2020

Troy Cornelius (born 28 January 1983) is a Guyanese cricketer. He played in two first-class matches for Guyana in 2005.

== See also ==
- List of Guyanese representative cricketers
