= Stanley Downer =

Guyanese cricketer

Personal information
- Born: 8 March 1884; Demerara, British Guiana
- Died: 19 January 1946 (aged 61); British Guiana
- Source: Cricinfo, 19 November 2020

Stanley Downer (8 March 1884 – 19 January 1946) was a cricketer. He played in two first-class matches for British Guiana in 1903/04 and 1908/09.

== See also ==
- List of Guyanese representative cricketers
