= Arjune Nandu =

Guyanese cricketer (born 1971)

Personal information
- Born: 31 December 1971 (age 54); Berbice, Guyana
- Source: Cricinfo, 19 November 2020

Arjune Nandu (born 31 December 1971) is a Guyanese cricketer. He played in four first-class matches for Guyana from 1988 to 1992.

== See also ==
- List of Guyanese representative cricketers
