= Tyrell Tull =

Guyanese cricketer (born 1986)

Personal information
- Born: 6 October 1986 (age 40)
- Source: Cricinfo, 19 November 2020

Tyrell Tull (born 6 October 1986) is a Guyanese cricketer. He played in four Twenty20 matches for Guyana in 2006.

== See also ==
- List of Guyanese representative cricketers
