= Herbert Gaskin =

Guyanese cricketer

Personal information
- Born: 29 January 1882; Berbice, British Guiana
- Source: Cricinfo, 19 November 2020

Herbert Gaskin (born 29 January 1882, date of death unknown) was a cricketer. He played in three first-class matches for British Guiana in 1901/02.

== See also ==
- List of Guyanese representative cricketers
