= William Thompson (British Guiana cricketer) =

Guyanese cricketer

Personal information
- Born: 1888; British Guiana
- Died: Unknown
- Source: Cricinfo, 19 November 2020

William Thompson (born 1888, date of death unknown) was a cricketer. He played in two first-class matches for British Guiana in 1907/08 and 1908/09.

== See also ==
- List of Guyanese representative cricketers
