= Harold Bayley =

Guyanese cricketer

Personal information
- Born: 25 May 1881; Georgetown, British Guiana
- Died: 30 August 1943 (aged 62); British Guiana
- Source: Cricinfo, 19 November 2020

Harold Bayley (25 May 1881 – 30 August 1943) was a cricketer. He played in fifteen first-class matches for British Guiana from 1901 to 1912.

== See also ==
- List of Guyanese representative cricketers
