= Harvey Sproston =

Guyanese cricketer

Personal information
- Born: 1 April 1871; East Bank, Demerara
- Source: Cricinfo, 19 November 2020

Harvey Sproston (born 1 April 1871, date of death unknown) was a cricketer from British Guiana. He played in four first-class matches for British Guiana from 1894 to 1900.

== See also ==
- List of Guyanese representative cricketers
