= Norman Jordan =

Guyanese cricketer

Personal information
- Born: 7 September 1888; Demerara, British Guiana
- Died: 4 September 1937 (aged 48); British Guiana
- Source: Cricinfo, 19 November 2020

Norman Jordan (7 September 1888 – 4 September 1937) was a cricketer. He played in two first-class matches for British Guiana in 1908/09 and 1909/10.

== See also ==
- List of Guyanese representative cricketers
