= Roderick Lovell =

Guyanese cricketer (born 1972)

Personal information
- Born: 23 May 1972 (age 54); Georgetown, Guyana
- Source: Cricinfo, 19 November 2020

Roderick Lovell (born 23 May 1972) is a Guyanese cricketer. He played in two first-class and three List A matches for Guyana from 1995 to 1998.

== See also ==
- List of Guyanese representative cricketers
