= Isaac Surienarine =

Guyanese cricketer (born 1946)

Personal information
- Born: 16 December 1946 (age 79); Berbice, British Guiana
- Source: Cricinfo, 19 November 2020

Isaac Surienarine (born 16 December 1946) is a Guyanese cricketer. He played in four first-class matches for Guyana from 1968 to 1976.

== See also ==
- List of Guyanese representative cricketers
