= Reginald Butts =

Guyanese cricketer

Personal information
- Born: 1855
- Died: Unknown
- Source: Cricinfo, 19 November 2020

Reginald Butts (born 1855, date of death unknown) was a Guyanese cricketer. He played in eight first-class matches for British Guiana from 1883 to 1911.

== See also ==
- List of Guyanese representative cricketers
