= Glen Robinson (cricketer) =

Guyanese cricketer (born 1971)

Personal information
- Born: 28 June 1971 (age 55); Guyana
- Source: Cricinfo, 19 November 2020

Glen Robinson (born 28 June 1971) is a Guyanese cricketer. He played in four List A matches for Guyana in 1994/95 and 1995/96.

== See also ==
- List of Guyanese representative cricketers
