= Leslie Wight =

Guyanese cricketer (1929–2004)

Cricket information
- Batting: Right-handed

International information
- National side: West Indies
- Only Test: 11 March 1953 v India

Career statistics
Competition	Test	First-class
Matches	1	12
Runs scored	21	1,260
Batting average	21.00	66.31
100s/50s	0/0	4/6
Top score	21	262*
Catches/stumpings	0/–	12/–
- Source: CricInfo, 30 October 2022

George Leslie Wight (28 May 1929 – 4 January 2004) was a Guyanese international cricketer who played in one Test match in 1953.

Wight played for British Guiana from 1949–50 to 1952–53. In the first match in 1951–52, against Barbados, he hit his first century, and went on to score 262 not out in 708 minutes, putting on 390 for the first wicket with Glendon Gibbs. He scored two more centuries in the season, and finished with 625 runs in four matches at 125.00.

In 1952-53 he scored 138 against Jamaica, putting on 225 for the first wicket with Bruce Pairaudeau. When the visiting Indian team played Jamaica he top-scored in the first innings with 79, and was selected for the Fourth Test that followed a few days later. Despite having replaced the opener Allan Rae in the team, and having made his name as an opener for British Guiana, Wight was asked to bat at number seven, and in his only innings he made 21 in more than two hours. It was his last first-class match, at the age of 23.

Wight came from a family with strong cricket credentials. Three of his brothers and two of his uncles played first-class cricket, one uncle, Vibart Wight, playing Test cricket as well.
