= John Branch (cricketer) =

Guyanese cricketer (1901–1950)

Personal information
- Born: 2 May 1901; Georgetown, British Guiana
- Died: 11 March 1950 (aged 48); British Guiana
- Source: Cricinfo, 19 November 2020

John Branch (2 May 1901 – 11 March 1950) was a Guyanese cricketer. He played in one first-class match for British Guiana in 1921/22.

== See also ==
- List of Guyanese representative cricketers
