= Sen Gopaul =

Guyanese cricketer (born 1957)

Personal information
- Born: 18 February 1957 (age 69); Georgetown, British Guiana
- Source: Cricinfo, 19 November 2020

Sen Gopaul (born 18 February 1957) is a Guyanese cricketer. He played in eleven first-class matches for Guyana from 1975 to 1980.

== See also ==
- List of Guyanese representative cricketers
