= Ron Matthews (cricketer) =

Guyanese cricketer (born 1983)

Personal information
- Born: 11 January 1983 (age 43); Georgetown, Guyana
- Source: Cricinfo, 19 November 2020

Ron Matthews (born 11 January 1983) is a Guyanese cricketer. He played in six first-class matches for Guyana in 2000/01.

== See also ==
- List of Guyanese representative cricketers
