= Keshwar Persaud =

Guyanese cricketer (born 1958)

Personal information
- Born: 23 December 1958 (age 67); Georgetown, British Guiana
- Source: Cricinfo, 19 November 2020

Keshwar Persaud (born 23 December 1958) is a Guyanese cricketer. He played in eight first-class and four List A matches for Guyana from 1978 to 1981.

== See also ==
- List of Guyanese representative cricketers
