= Isaac Henry (cricketer) =

Guyanese cricketer

Personal information
- Born: 21 May 1901; Demerara, British Guiana
- Source: Cricinfo, 19 November 2020

Isaac Henry (born 21 May 1901, date of death unknown) was a Guyanese cricketer. He played in three first-class matches for British Guiana from 1921 to 1925.

== See also ==
- List of Guyanese representative cricketers
