= Martin Reid (cricketer) =

Guyanese cricketer (1907–1970)

Personal information
- Born: 5 November 1907; Georgetown, British Guiana
- Died: 6 April 1970 (aged 62); Guyana
- Source: Cricinfo, 19 November 2020

Martin Reid (5 November 1907 – 6 April 1970) was a Guyanese cricketer. He played in two first-class matches for British Guiana in 1925/26 and 1926/27.

== See also ==
- List of Guyanese representative cricketers
