= Sydney Matthews =

Guyanese cricketer (born 1952)

Personal information
- Born: 22 January 1952 (age 74); Demerara, British Guiana
- Source: Cricinfo, 19 November 2020

Sydney Matthews (born 22 January 1952) is a Guyanese cricketer. He played in 41 first-class and 6 List A matches for Guyana from 1969 to 1988.

== See also ==
- List of Guyanese representative cricketers
