= Edwin Mohamed =

Guyanese cricketer (born 1937)

Personal information
- Born: 31 July 1937 (age 89); East Bank, Demerara
- Source: Cricinfo, 19 November 2020

Edwin Mohamed (born 31 July 1937) is a Guyanese cricketer. He played in twelve first-class matches for British Guiana from 1957 to 1967.

== See also ==
- List of Guyanese representative cricketers
