= Marjoribanks North =

Guyanese cricketer (1865–1949)

Personal information
- Full name: Marjoribanks Keppel North
- Born: 17 November 1865; Mitford, England
- Died: 27 March 1949 (aged 83); Amersham, England
- Batting: Right-handed
- Role: Batsman

Domestic team information
- Years: Team
- 1894/95–1896/97: British Guiana

Career statistics
Competition	First-class
Matches	7
Runs scored	128
Batting average	12.80
100s/50s	0/0
Top score	36
Catches/stumpings	2/–
- Source: Cricinfo, 19 November 2020

Marjoribanks Keppel North (17 November 1865 – 27 March 1949) was a Guyanese cricketer. He played in seven first-class matches for British Guiana from 1894 to 1897.
