= Samuel Snow (cricketer) =

Jamaican cricketer

Personal information
- Born: 21 April 1880; British Guiana
- Died: 8 September 1931 (aged 51); Venezuela
- Source: Cricinfo, 5 November 2020

Samuel Snow (21 April 1880 – 8 September 1931) was a cricketer. He played in thirteen first-class matches for the British Guiana and Jamaican cricket team from 1901 to 1911.
