= Glendon Gibbs =

West Indian cricketer

Personal information
- Full name: Glendon Lionel Gibbs
- Born: 27 December 1925; Georgetown, British Guiana
- Died: 21 February 1979 (aged 53); Georgetown, Guyana
- Batting: Left-handed
- Bowling: Slow left-arm orthodox

International information
- National side: West Indies
- Test debut (cap 85): 26 March 1955 v Australia

Domestic team information
- Years: Team
- 1949/50-1962/63: British Guiana

Career statistics
Competition	Tests	FC
Matches	1	28
Runs scored	12	1,730
Batting average	6.00	36.80
100s/50s	0/0	5/6
Top score	12	216
Balls bowled	24	2,170
Wickets	0	23
Bowling average	–	53.47
5 wickets in innings	0	1
10 wickets in match	0	0
Best bowling	–	6/80
Catches/stumpings	1/–	15/–
- Source: Cricinfo, 30 July 2022

Glendon Lionel Gibbs (27 December 1925 – 21 February 1979) was a West Indian cricketer who played in one Test in 1955.

Glendon Gibbs was a left-handed opening batsman and an occasional slow left-arm bowler who played regularly in West Indies cricket for British Guiana from 1949–50 to 1962–63. In 1951, playing against Barbados at Bourda cricket ground, Georgetown, he scored 216 and put on 390 for the first wicket with Leslie Wight, then a West Indies record.

Gibbs' single Test match was the first game in the 1954–55 series at home to the Australians at Kingston, Jamaica. He scored 12 and 0 and was dropped for the next match. In a period when West Indies sometimes struggled to find reliable openers, he was perhaps unlucky not to receive further chances.

After Gibbs retired from playing, he became an administrator, and was secretary of the Guyana Cricket Board at the time of his death.
