= William Sherlock (cricketer) =

West Indian cricketer

Personal information
- Full name: William Verling Sherlock
- Born: 30 November 1881; Georgetown, Demerara, Guyana
- Died: 9 May 1937 (aged 55); Wynstrode, Billingshurst, Sussex, England
- Batting: Right-handed
- Role: Batsman

Domestic team information
- Years: Team
- 1908/09–1910/11: British Guiana

Career statistics
Competition	First-class
Matches	5
Runs scored	134
Batting average	19.14
100s/50s	0/1
Top score	75*
Balls bowled	24
Wickets	0
Bowling average	–
5 wickets in innings	–
10 wickets in match	–
Best bowling	–
Catches/stumpings	2/–
- Source: CricInfo, 24 August 2011

William Verling Sherlock (30 November 1881 – 9 May 1937) was a Demerara born cricketer who represented British Guiana and the West Indies before they were granted Test cricket status.

== Early life ==
Sherlock was born in Georgetown, Demerara, but educated in England at Dulwich College. At Dulwich he played for the school XI in 1900–1901.

== Cricket career ==
On his return from England, Sherlock played for the Georgetown Cricket Club. He represented British Guiana in 1908/09 and 1910/11, first playing against Barbados in the 1908/09 Inter-colonial tournament at Bridgetown's Kensington Oval. In October of that year he played against WC Shepherd's XI at Bourda, Georgetown. In September 1910 he again played against Barbados and in 1911 represented British Guiana against the Marylebone Cricket Club on the Marylebone Cricket Club tour of the West Indies in 1910/11. He was selected to play for the West Indies XI in 1910/11 on that same tour.
