= John Dare (cricketer) =

Guyanese cricketer (1906–1996)

Personal information
- Full name: John St Felix Dare
- Born: 19 August 1906; Georgetown, British Guiana
- Died: 10 February 1996 (aged 89); London, England
- Source: Cricinfo, 19 November 2020

John St Felix Dare (19 August 1906 – 10 February 1996) was a Guyanese cricketer. He played in eleven first-class matches for British Guiana from 1924 to 1939.

== See also ==
- List of Guyanese representative cricketers
