= Benjamin Bayley =

Guyanese cricketer

Personal information
- Born: 1 December 1874; Georgetown, British Guiana
- Died: 16 March 1924 (aged 49); British Guiana
- Source: Cricinfo, 19 November 2020

Benjamin Bayley (1 December 1874 – 16 March 1924) was a cricketer from British Guiana. He played in five first-class matches for British Guiana from 1896 to 1912.

== See also ==
- List of Guyanese representative cricketers
