= Tyrone Etwaroo =

Guyanese cricketer (born 1959)

Personal information
- Full name: Tyronne Ranjit Etwaroo
- Born: 23 August 1959 (age 67); Port Mourant, Berbice, British Guiana
- Batting: Right-handed
- Bowling: Leg break
- Relatives: Reginald Etwaroo (brother); Romain Etwaroo (brother); Rohan Kanhai (uncle)

Domestic team information
- Years: Team
- 1977/78–1983/84: Berbice
- 1979/80–1983/84: Guyana
- 1981–1983: Northumberland

Career statistics
Competition	First-class	List A
Matches	23	13
Runs scored	1,131	222
Batting average	31.41	18.50
100s/50s	2/6	–/–
Top score	198	47
Balls bowled	72	0
Wickets	0	–
Bowling average	–	–
5 wickets in innings	–	–
10 wickets in match	–	–
Best bowling	–	–
Catches/stumpings	11/–	2/–
- Source: Cricinfo, 16 June 2019

Tyronne Ranjit Etwaroo (born 23 August 1959) is a Guyanese former first-class cricketer who represented Berbice, Guyana and an International XI in first-class cricket.

== Life and cricket career ==
Etwaroo was born at Port Mourant in August 1959, where he was educated at Corentyne Comprehensive High School. He debuted in first-class cricket for Berbice against Demerara in the 1977–78 Jones Cup at Georgetown. He was selected to play first-class cricket for Guyana in 1979–80 Shell Shield, making his debut against Barbados. In that same season he made his debut in List A one-day cricket for Guyana against the Windward Islands. Etwaroo played first-class and List A cricket for Guyana until 1984, making fifteen first-class and ten List A appearances. He toured Pakistan with an International XI in 1981–82, making on first-class and three List A appearances, He played a key role in the International XI in the first one-day match against Pakistan, scoring 22 runs opening the batting, which proved important in a low-scoring match. Etwaroo played a total of 23 first-class matches, scoring 1,131 runs at an average of 31.41. He made two centuries, with a high score 198 which he made in his final first-class match for Berbice against Demerara in the 1983–84 Jones Cup, an occasion on which he captained Berbice. In one-day cricket he made thirteen appearances, scoring 222 runs with a high score of 47.

He also played minor counties cricket in England for Northumberland from 1981–83, making seventeen appearances in the Minor Counties Championship and one appearance in the MCCA Knockout Trophy. He later emigrated to the United States, returning to Guyana annually with teams to take part in exhibition matches. He founded the Port Mourant Reunion Cricket Match, alongside his brothers Reginald and Romain, who both played first-class cricket. His uncle is the former West Indies cricketer Rohan Kanhai.
