= Mark Harper (cricketer) =

Guyanese cricketer and coach (born 1957)

Personal information
- Full name: Mark Anthony Harper
- Born: 31 October 1957 (age 69); Georgetown, Guyana
- Batting: Right-handed
- Bowling: Right-arm medium pace
- Relatives: Roger Harper (brother)

Domestic team information
- Years: Team
- 1974–1990: Demerara
- 1975–1991: Guyana

Head coaching information
- Years: Team
- 2001–2004: Bermuda
- 2007–2008: Turks and Caicos Islands

Career statistics
| Competition | First-class | List A |
|---|---|---|
| Matches | 42 | 13 |
| Runs scored | 2,156 | 253 |
| Batting average | 33.68 | 23.00 |
| 100s/50s | 4/12 | 0/1 |
| Top score | 149* | 74 |
| Balls bowled | 666 | 210 |
| Wickets | 6 | 0 |
| Bowling average | 44.50 | – |
| 5 wickets in innings | 0 | 0 |
| 10 wickets in match | 0 | 0 |
| Best bowling | 2/10 | 0/9 |
| Catches/stumpings | 42/– | 2/– |
- Source: CricketArchive, 3 February 2011

Mark Anthony Harper (born 31 October 1957 in Georgetown, Guyana) is a former cricketer and current head coach of Guyana, a team he represented throughout his playing career. Harper has previously coached the national teams of Bermuda (from 2001 to 2004) and the Turks and Caicos Islands (from 2007 to 2008). Harper's brother, Roger, played international cricket for the West Indies in the 1980s and 1990s.
