= John Austin (cricketer) =

Barbadian cricketer (1871–1956)

Personal information
- Born: 20 June 1871; Saint Philip, Barbados
- Died: 2 November 1956 (aged 85); Victoria, British Columbia, Canada
- Source: Cricinfo, 11 November 2020

John Austin (20 June 1871 – 2 November 1956) was a Barbadian cricketer. He played in two first-class matches for the Barbados cricket team in 1905/06.

== See also ==
- List of Barbadian representative cricketers
