= Walter Griffith (cricketer) =

Guyanese cricketer (1915–1983)

Personal information
- Born: 9 January 1915; Demerara, British Guiana
- Died: 6 July 1983 (aged 68); Guyana
- Source: Cricinfo, 19 November 2020

Walter Griffith (9 January 1915 – 6 July 1983) was a Guyanese cricketer. He played in six first-class matches for British Guiana from 1938 to 1948.

== See also ==
- List of Guyanese representative cricketers
