= John Farnum (cricketer) =

Guyanese cricketer

Personal information
- Born: 5 August 1883; Georgetown, Demarara
- Source: Cricinfo, 19 November 2020

John Farnum (born 5 August 1883, date of death unknown) was a Guyanese cricketer. He played in two first-class matches for British Guiana in 1903/04 and 1909/10.

== See also ==
- List of Guyanese representative cricketers
