= Leon Stewart (cricketer) =

Guyanese cricketer (born 1942)

Personal information
- Born: 21 July 1942 (age 84); Georgetown, British Guiana
- Source: Cricinfo, 19 November 2020

Leon Stewart (born 21 July 1942) is a Guyanese cricketer. He played in six first-class matches for British Guiana in 1968/69 and 1969/70.

== See also ==
- List of Guyanese representative cricketers
