= Leslaine Lambert =

Guyanese cricketer (born 1958)

Personal information
- Born: 13 August 1958 (age 68); Berbice, British Guiana
- Source: Cricinfo, 19 November 2020

Leslaine Lambert (born 13 August 1958) is a Guyanese cricketer. He played in eighteen first-class and six List A matches for Guyana from 1978 to 1987.

== See also ==
- List of Guyanese representative cricketers
