= Naresh Roopnarine =

Guyanese cricketer (born 1980)

Personal information
- Born: 15 December 1980 (age 45); Berbice, Guyana
- Source: Cricinfo, 19 November 2020

Naresh Roopnarine (born 15 December 1980) is a Guyanese cricketer. He played in one first-class match for Guyana in 2002/03.

== See also ==
- List of Guyanese representative cricketers
