= Keith Cameron (cricketer) =

Guyanese cricketer (born 1947)

Personal information
- Born: 31 January 1947 (age 79); Georgetown, British Guiana
- Source: Cricinfo, 19 November 2020

Keith Cameron (born 31 January 1947) is a Guyanese cricketer. He played in twenty-three first-class and four List A matches for Guyana from 1972 to 1978.

== See also ==
- List of Guyanese representative cricketers
