= Clement King =

Guyanese cricketer

Personal information
- Born: 15 September 1874; Berbice, British Guiana
- Source: Cricinfo, 19 November 2020

Clement King (born 15 September 1874, date of death unknown) was a cricketer from British Guiana. He played in sixteen first-class matches for British Guiana from 1894 to 1905.

== See also ==
- List of Guyanese representative cricketers
