= Kamal Singh (Guyanese cricketer) =

Guyanese cricketer (born 1955)

Personal information
- Born: 3 April 1955 (age 71); Berbice, British Guiana
- Source: Cricinfo, 19 November 2020

Kamal Singh (born 3 April 1955) is a Guyanese cricketer. He played in nine first-class and seven List A matches for Guyana from 1980 to 1984.

== See also ==
- List of Guyanese representative cricketers
