= Francis Austin (cricketer) =

Barbadian cricketer (1882–1938)

Personal information
- Born: 10 April 1882; Saint Michael, Barbados
- Died: 23 January 1938 (aged 55); Saint Michael, Barbados
- Source: Cricinfo, 11 November 2020

Francis Austin (10 April 1882 – 23 January 1938) was a Barbadian cricketer. He played in ten first-class matches for the Barbados and British Guiana from 1904 to 1913.

== See also ==
- List of Barbadian representative cricketers
