= Amarnauth Ramcharitar =

Guyanese cricketer (born 1958)

Personal information
- Born: 18 August 1958 (age 68); Berbice, British Guiana
- Source: Cricinfo, 19 November 2020

Amarnauth Ramcharitar (born 18 August 1958) is a Guyanese cricketer. He played in one List A and seven first-class matches for Guyana from 1978 to 1984.

== See also ==
- List of Guyanese representative cricketers
