= Walter Weber (cricketer) =

Guyanese cricketer (1879–1941)

Personal information
- Born: 21 February 1879; Georgetown, British Guiana
- Died: 4 April 1941 (aged 62); British Guiana
- Source: Cricinfo, 19 November 2020

Walter Weber (21 February 1879 – 4 April 1941) was a cricketer. He played in eighteen first-class matches for British Guiana from 1894 to 1910.

== See also ==
- List of Guyanese representative cricketers
