= Romain Etwaroo =

Guyanese cricketer (born 1946)

Personal information
- Born: 16 December 1946 (age 79); Berbice, British Guiana
- Source: Cricinfo, 19 November 2020

Romain Etwaroo (born 16 December 1946) is a Guyanese cricketer. He played in twenty-four first-class and two List A matches for Guyana from 1971 to 1982.

== See also ==
- List of Guyanese representative cricketers
