= Suresh Ganouri =

Guyanese cricketer (born 1957)

Personal information
- Born: 6 January 1957 (age 69); Berbice, British Guiana
- Source: Cricinfo, 19 November 2020

Suresh Ganouri (born 6 January 1957) is a Guyanese cricketer. He played in ten first-class and two List A matches for Guyana from 1976 to 1984.

== See also ==
- List of Guyanese representative cricketers
