= List of Barbadian representative cricketers =

List of cricketers

This is a list of all cricketers who have played first-class, List A or Twenty20 cricket for the Barbados national cricket team in the West Indies. Seasons given are first and last seasons; the player did not necessarily play in all the intervening seasons.

== A ==
- Grantley Adams, 1925/26
- David Allan, 1955/56–1965/66
- Anthony Alleyne, 2016/17–2018/19
- Hartley Alleyne, 1978/79–1993
- Marven Alleyne, 1974/75
- Peter Alleyne, 1987/88–1988/89
- Robert Alleyne, 1871/72
- William Alleyne, 1887/88–1894/95
- Frederick Archer, 1907/08–1925/26
- Nichollas Archer, 1912/13
- Greg Armstrong, 1973/74–1977/78
- Sean Armstrong, 1995/96–2001/02
- Robert Arthur, 1896/97
- Winslow Ashby, 1970/71–1974/75
- Anthony Atkins, 1958-1958/59
- Denis Atkinson, 1946/47–1960/61
- Eric Atkinson, 1949/50–1957/58
- Francis Austin, 1910/11–1912/13
- Henry Adrian Austin, 1996/97
- Henry Fitzherbert Austin, 1897/98–1903/04
- Harold Austin, 1894/95–1925/26
- John Austin, 1905/06
- Ryan Austin, 2000/01–2006/07

== B ==
- Larry Babb, 2010–2011/12
- Herbert Bailey, 1908/09–1910/11
- Keith Bancroft, 1904/05
- Kenneth Bancroft, 1904/05 (Note: Bancroft played in a single first-class match for Jamaica in the 1904/05 season. No biographical details are known.)
- Hughley Barker, 1951/52–1955/56
- Howell Barnes, 1903/04–1904/05
- Luther Barrow, 1904/05–1905/06
- Barto Bartlett, 1923/24–1938/39
- Richard Batson, 1909/10–1911/12
- Clyde Beckles, 1977/78–1978/79
- Joe Benn, 1901/02 (Note: Benn played in a single first-class match for Jamaica in the 1901/02 season. No biographical details are known.)
- Sulieman Benn, 1999/2000–2018/19
- Jason Bennett, 2004–2006/07
- Carlisle Best, 1979/80–1993/94
- Tino Best, 2001/02–2015/16
- Arthur Bethell, 1963/64–1969/70
- Lionel Birkett, 1923/24–1928/29
- Theodore Birkett, 1942–1956/57
- Derrick Bishop, 2005/06–2007/08
- Joshua Bishop, 2017/18–2019/20
- Roger Blackman, 1940/41–1941/42
- Wayne Blackman, 1999/2000–2007/08
- Charles Blades, 1904/05–1905/06
- Colin Blades, 1963/64–1969/70
- M Blagrove, 1997/98 (Note: Blagrove played in a single first-class match for Jamaica in the 1997/98 season. No biographical details are known.)
- Leniko Boucher, 2018/19–2019/20
- Rashidi Boucher, 2008/09–2018/19
- Charles Bourne, 1931/32–1942
- Bill Bourne, 1970/71–1976/77
- William Bowring, 1899/1900–1901/02
- Darnley Boxill, 1964/65–1971/72
- Camarie Boyce, 2019/20
- Keith Boyce, 1964/65–1975/76
- Cecil Bradshaw, 1951/52
- Ian Bradshaw, 1994/95–2006/07
- Rudolph Bradshaw, 1964/65
- Rawle Brancker, 1955/56–1969/70
- Kenneth Branker, 1951/52–1955/56
- Adrian Brathwaite, 2000
- Carlos Brathwaite, 2010–2017/18
- Hubert Brathwaite, 1978/79–1983/84
- Justin Brathwaite, 2012/13–2013/14
- John Brathwaite, 1891/92
- Kemar Brathwaite, 2015/16
- Kraigg Brathwaite, 2008/09–2019/20
- Shamarh Brooks, 2005/06–2019/20
- Oliver Broome, 1964/65
- Henderson Broomes, 1994/95–1998/99
- Noel Broomes, 1982/83–1986/87
- Alfred Browne, 1883/84–1887/88
- Clement Browne, 1891/92–1904/05
- Allan Browne, 1907/08–1929/30
- Don Browne, 1919/20–1926/27
- Courtney Browne, 1990/91–2005/06
- Snuffy Browne, 1908/09–1910/11
- Patrick Browne, 2004/05–2011/12
- Robert Browne, 1883/84–1896/97
- Samuel Browne, 1864/65–1871/72
- Henderson Bryan, 1993–2001/02
- Irwin Burke, 1938/39
- Henry Burnett, 1871/72
- Chetwyn Burnham, 1964/65
- Roland Butcher, 1974/75
- John Byer, 1929/30–1935/36
- Robin Bynoe, 1957/58–1972/73

== C ==
- Barry Callender, 1994/95
- Sherwin Campbell, 1989/90–2004/05
- Trevor Campbell, 1969/70
- George Carew, 1934/35–1947/48
- John Carrington, 1865/66
- Duncan Carter, 1964/65
- Jonathan Carter, 2007/08–2019/20
- Edward Challenor, 1894/95–1895/96
- George Challenor, 1904/05–1929/30
- Robert Challenor, 1904/05–1924/25
- Vicary Challenor, 1901/02–1903/04
- Nikolai Charles, 2005/06–2016/17
- Roston Chase, 2010/11–2018/19
- Frederick Clairmonte, 1909/10
- Bertie Clarke, 1937/38–1938/39
- Carleton Clarke, 1893/94
- Michael Clarke, 1940/41
- Mitchell Clarke, 1928/29
- Nolan Clarke, 1969/70–1976/77
- Shakeem Clarke, 2017/18
- Shirley Clarke, 2000–2005/06
- Sylvester Clarke, 1976/77–1981/82
- Thomas Clarke, 1871/72
- Theodore Clarke, 1883/84–1887/88
- William Clarke, 1864/65–1887/88
- Hallam Cole, 1894/95–1907/08
- Pedro Collins, 1996/97–2011/12
- Corey Collymore, 1998/99–2008/09
- Ernest Collymore, 1922/23
- Walter Collymore, 1883/84
- Valance Connell, 1969/70
- Learie Constantine, 1938/39
- Kyle Corbin, 2014/15–2016/17
- Allan Cox, 1895/96
- Gustavus Cox, 1893/94–1905/06
- Hampden Cox, 1887/88
- Percy Cox, 1896/97–1899/1900
- Cuthbert Crick, 1940/41
- Chester Cumberbatch, 1933/34–1938/39
- Dave Cumberbatch, 1983/84–1984/85
- Julian Cumberbatch, 1907/08
- Anderson Cummins, 1988/89–1995/96
- Miguel Cummins, 2011/12–2019/20
- Dane Currency, 2015/16

== D ==
- Darnley Da Costa, 1899/1900
- Wayne Daniel, 1975/76–1984/85
- Clairmonte Depeiaza, 1951/52–1956/57
- Othneil Downes, 1958–1958/59
- Shane Dowrich, 2009/10–2019/20
- Hillard Doyle, 1961/62
- Dominic Drakes, 2017/18–2018/19
- Vasbert Drakes, 1991/92–2003/04

== E ==
- Corey Edwards, 2009/10
- Fidel Edwards, 2001/02–2014/15
- John Edwards, 1931/32–1937/38
- Kirk Edwards, 2005/06–2014/15
- Prof Edwards, 1961/62–1976/77
- Dale Ellcock, 1986/87
- Ricardo Ellcock, 1983/84–1984/85
- Greenidge Elliott, 1883/84
- James Emtage, 1921/22
- Roddy Estwick, 1982/83–1993
- Edward Evelyn, 1883/84

== F ==
- Stephen Farmer, 1969/70–1976/77
- Wilfred Farmer, 1946/47–1958
- Walter Fields, 1907/08–1912/13
- Campbell Foster, 1936/37–1937/38
- Geoffrey Foster, 1958–1961/62
- Leon Foster, 1931/32–1935/36
- Teddy Foster, 1975/76–1980/81
- Walter Foster, 1941/42
- George Francis, 1924/25–1929/30
- Michael Frederick, 1944/45

== G ==
- Joel Garner, 1975/76–1993
- Will Gibbs, 1907/08–1926/27
- Ottis Gibson, 1990/91–1998/99
- Arnold Gilkes, 1983/84–1987/88
- Benjamin Gilkes, 1919/20–1929/30
- Odwin Gilkes, 1984/85
- Oswald Gilkes, 1919/20
- Shirley Gill, 1940/41
- Stanton Gittens, 1934/35–1944/45
- Corey Glasgow, 2000–2000/01
- John Goddard, 1936/37–1957/58
- Kenneth Goddard, 1948/49
- Clifford Goodman, 1887/88–1896/97
- Gerald Goodman, 1893/94
- Percy Goodman, 1891/92–1912/13
- Walter Goodman, 1891/92–1893/94
- Hattian Graham, 1997/98–2000
- Marlon Graham, 2010/11
- Ormond Graham, 1942/43
- Ronald Graham, 1978/79 (Note: Graham played in a single List A match for Jamaica in the 1978/79 season. No biographical details are known.)
- Shawn Graham, 2000–2004/05
- Adrian Grant, 1986/87–1989
- Herbert Greaves, 1923/24–1929/30
- Justin Greaves, 2012/13–2019/20
- Sherlon Greaves, 1983/84–1993/94
- Edmund Greene, 1943/44–1945/46
- Vibert Greene, 1985/86–1987/88
- Alvin Greenidge, 1974/75–1993
- Gordon Greenidge, 1972/73–1993
- Geoff Greenidge, 1966/67–1975/76
- Winston Greenidge, 1951/52
- Malcolm Greenidge, 1895/96
- Whitney Greenidge, 1958–1960/61
- Tyrone Greenidge, 1985/86–1987/88
- Adrian Griffith, 1992/93–2001/02
- Charlie Griffith, 1959/60–1966/67
- Teddy Griffith, 1953/54–1955/56
- Herman Griffith, 1921/22–1940/41
- Harold Griffith, 1943/44–1946/47
- Russell Griffiths, 1933/34

== H ==
- Wes Hall, 1955/56–1970/71
- Gerry Harding, 1974/75
- Keon Harding, 2016/17–2019/20
- Arnott Harris, 1934/35
- Joseph Harris, 1988/89
- Leslie Harris, 1942–1944/45
- Albert Hassell, 1955/56
- Desmond Haynes, 1976/77–1994/95
- Henry Haynes, 1864/65
- Jason Haynes, 2005/06–2010/11
- Fitz Hinds, 1901/02–1904/05
- Hilton Hinds, 1907/08
- Jason Hinds, 2010
- Ryan Hinds, 1998/99–2014/15
- Ernest Hinkson, 1887/88
- Stephen Hinkson, 1969–1973/74
- Edwin Hoad, 1896/97
- Teddy Hoad, 1922/23–1937/38
- Edward Hoad, 1944/45–1953/54
- John Hoad, 1919/20–1921/22
- William Hoad, 1901/02
- Adzil Holder, 1951/52–1958/59
- Alcindo Holder, 2005/06–2012/13
- Chaim Holder, 2018/19
- Chemar Holder, 2017/18–2019/20
- Jason Holder, 2008/09–2019/20
- Roland Holder, 1985/86–2000/01
- Vanburn Holder, 1966/67–1977/78
- David Holford, 1960/61–1978/79
- Kyle Hope, 2009/10–2013/14
- Shai Hope, 2012/13–2017/18
- Leonard Horne, 1901/02
- Tony Howard, 1965/66–1974/75
- William Howell, 1883/84–1894/95
- Ricky Hoyte, 1988/89–1998/99
- Chris Humphrey, 2000
- Conrad Hunte, 1950/51–1966/67
- Terry Hunte, 1983/84–1987/88
- Ryan Hurley, 1995/96–2004/05
- Geoffrey Hutchinson, 1955/56
- Leo Hutchinson, 1925/26–1929/30
- Lionel Hutson, 1922/23–1924/25

== I ==
- Harry Ince, 1912/13–1929/30
- Bruce Inniss, 1942
- Clifford Inniss, 1928/29–1938/39
- Michael Inniss, 1985/86–1989

== J ==
- Edward Jackman, 1887/88–1897/98
- Allan Jemmott, 1891/92
- Allison Johnson, 1987/88–1988/89
- Anthony Johnson, 1987/88–1989/90
- Nigel Johnson, 1978/79–1986/87
- Wesley Johnson, 1896/97
- Aaron Jones, 2013/14–2018/19
- Elon Jones, 1986/87
- Robert Jones, 1911/12
- Chris Jordan, 2011/12–2012/13
- Emmerson Jordan, 1988/89–1989
- Harold Jordan, 1936/37
- Shane Julien, 1980/81

== K ==
- John Kidney, 1904/05–1931/32
- Anthony King, 1960/61–1970/71. * Brandon King 2019-still in the team
- Collis King, 1972/73–1993
- Earnest King, 1864/65–1865/66
- Erskine King, 1966/67–1968/69
- Frank King, 1947/48–1956/57
- Horace King, 1948/49–1952/53
- Nicholas Kirton, 2018/19–2019/20
- Tyrone Knight, 1977/78

== L ==
- Arthur Laborde, 1895/96
- Peter Lashley, 1957/58–1974/75
- Mark Lavine, 1992/93–1998/99
- Oliver Layne, 1901/02–1904/05
- Ryan Layne, 2004/05–2010/11
- George Learmond, 1894/95–1895/96
- George Linton, 1981/82–1989/90
- Frank Lobo, 1933/34
- Callitos Lopez, 2000–2004
- John Lucas, 1945/46–1949/50
- Noel Lucas, 1953/54–1954/55

== M ==
- Donald McAuley, 1887/88–1897/98
- Zachary McCaskie, 2019/20
- William McClean, 1864/65
- Preston McSween, 2016/17
- Geoffrey Mapp, 1984/85
- Dave Marshall, 1992/93–2000/01
- Malcolm Marshall, 1977/78–1990/91
- Norman Marshall, 1940/41–1955/56
- Roy Marshall, 1945/46–1952/53
- Manny Martindale, 1929/30–1935/36
- Dale Mason, 2000
- Kenneth Mason, 1903/04–1925/26
- Neville Mason, 1984/85
- Lawrence Maxwell, 1968/69–1978/79
- Anthony Mayers, 1954/55–1955/56
- Antonio Mayers, 1998/99–2006
- Kyle Mayers, 2011/12–2019/20
- Michael Mayers, 1905/06–1908/09
- Dayne Maynard, 1993/94–2000/01
- Michael Maynard, 2000
- Avelyn Medford, 1938/39
- Errol Millington, 1946/47–1950/51
- Marquino Mindley, 2018/19
- Joseph Moore, 1904/05
- Carlo Morris, 2004–2012/13
- Ezra Moseley, 1981/82–1991/92
- Hallam Moseley, 1969–1971/72
- Shayne Moseley, 2017/18–2019/20
- Carl Mullins, 1950/51–1953/54
- David Murray, 1970/71–1981/82

== N ==
- Graydon Nesfield, 1964/65
- Joseph Newton, 1975/76–1976/77
- Anton Norris, 1962/63
- Ashley Nurse, 2010–2019/20
- Martin Nurse, 2001/02–2011/12
- Ryan Nurse, 2003/04–2007/08
- Rohan Nurse, 2008/09
- Seymour Nurse, 1958–1972/73

== O ==
- Rachid O'Neale, 2011/12–2016/17
- Kjorn Ottley, 2019/20
- Barton Outram, 1903/04–1904/05
- Walter Outram, 1871/72

== P ==
- Charles Packer, 1896/97–1897/98
- Edward Packer, 1883/84–1887/88
- James Packer, 1865/66
- Albert Padmore, 1972/73–1981/82
- Jason Parris, 2004–2008/09
- James Parris, 1925/26–1946/47
- Richard Parris, 1864/65–1865/66
- Colin Payne, 1971/72–1972/73
- Thelston Payne, 1978/79–1989/90
- Thomas Peirce, 1941/42–1948/49
- Joseph Phillips, 1919/20
- Neal Phillips, 1978/79–1984/85
- Omar Phillips, 2011/12–2017/18
- Wycliffe Phillips, 1966/67
- George Pile, 1883/84–1891/92
- John Pilgrim, 1887/88–1891/92
- Owen Pilgrim, 1919/20–1925/26
- Roshon Primus, 2019/20
- Ahmed Proverbs, 1990/91–2007/08
- Elbert Proverbs, 1982/83–1984/85
- Gordon Proverbs, 1948/49–1954/55
- Stanton Proverbs, 1989/90–1996/97
- Livingstone Puckerin, 1988/89–1995/96

== R ==
- Mario Rampersaud, 2011/12–2017/18
- Shane Ramsay, 2008/09
- Courtenay Reece, 1926/27–1929/30
- Clinton Reed, 1899/1900
- Winston Reid, 1985/86–1999/2000
- Elvis Reifer, 1984/85–1985/86
- Floyd Reifer, 1991/92–2006/07
- George Reifer, 1979/80–1984/85
- Leslie Reifer, 1977/78–1988/89
- Dale Richards, 2000–2011/12
- Kemar Roach, 2005/06–2019/20
- Thomas Roberts, 1896/97–1897/98
- Oscar Robinson, 1943/44–1946/47
- George Rock, 1960/61–1968/69
- Cecil Rogers, 1935/36–1936/37
- Herbert Rogers, 1926/27–1928/29
- Terry Rollock, 1996/97–1997/98
- Stephen Rudder, 1895/96–1901/02

== S ==
- Clinton St Hill, 1986/87
- Javon Searles, 2005/06–2019/20
- Glenroy Sealy, 1964/65
- Derek Sealy, 1928/29–1942/43
- Mark Sealy, 1987/88–1988/89
- Courtenay Selman, 1970/71–1973/74
- John Shepherd, 1964/65–1970/71
- William Shepherd, 1901/02–1905/06
- Henderson Simmons, 1970/71
- Henry Simmons, 1899/1900–1907/08
- Ernest Skeete, 1883/84–1887/88
- Harold Skeete, 1924/25–1928/29
- John Skeete, 1865/66
- Ricardo Skeete, 1975/76–1984/85
- Sam Skeete, 1989/90–1993/94
- Torrance Skeete, 1871/72–1887/88
- Eric Skelton, 1901/02
- Clarence Skinner, 1935/36
- Henry Skinner, 1941/42–1944/45
- Milton Small, 1983/84–1991/92
- Augustus Smith, 1864/65–1871/72
- AWL Smith, 1896/97 (Note: Smith played in a single first-class match for Jamaica in the 1896/97 season. No biographical details are known.)
- Cammie Smith, 1951/52–1962/63
- Dwayne Smith, 2001/02–2015/16
- Eustace Smith, 1897/98
- Frederick Smith, 1864/65–1871/72
- Jamal Smith, 2011/12
- Richard Smith, 1893/94
- Garfield Sobers, 1952/53–1982/83
- Arthur Somers-Cocks, 1894/95–1904/05
- Francis Speed, 1871/72
- Thomas Speed, 1864/65
- Charles Spooner, 1933/34–1934/35
- Hendy Springer, 1987/88–1997/98
- Khalid Springer, 2007/08–2009/10
- Shamar Springer, 2017/18–2019/20
- Franklyn Stephenson, 1981/82–1989/90
- Kevin Stoute, 2006/07–2019/20
- Richard Straker, 1976/77–1978/79

== T ==
- Percy Tarilton, 1905/06–1929/30
- Alfred Taylor, 1966/67
- Charlie Taylor, 1941/42–1951/52
- Antonio Thomas, 2001/02–2005/06
- Frank Thomas, 1944/45
- Randy Thomas, 2002/03
- Patterson Thompson, 1994/95–1998/99
- Peter Thompson, 1992/93–1993/94
- Herbert Thorne, 1891/92
- Emmerson Trotman, 1975/76–1981/82
- Henry Trotman, 1865/66
- John Trotman, 1864/65

== W ==
- Gladstone Waithe, 1928/29–1940/41
- Clyde Walcott, 1941/42–1955/56
- Keith Walcott, 1940/41–1951/52
- Leslie Walcott, 1925/26–1935/36
- Michael Walcott, 1974/75
- Tevyn Walcott, 2017/18–2019/20
- Victor Walcott, 1986/87–1993/94
- Philo Wallace, 1989–2002/03
- Horace Walrond, 1992/93–1999/2000
- Hayden Walsh Jr., 2015/16–2018/19
- Edward Ward, 1928/29
- Kenneth Warren, 1954/55
- Jomel Warrican, 2011/12–2019/20
- Charles Webb, 1865/66
- Everton Weekes, 1944/45–1963/64
- Tony White, 1958–1965/66
- William White, 1903/04–1905/06
- George Whitehall, 1864/65–1871/72
- Ryan Wiggins, 2006/07–2016/17
- Kurt Wilkinson, 2000–2005/06
- Cecil Williams, 1947/48–1956/57
- Foffie Williams, 1934/35–1951/52
- Joseph Williams, 1995/96–1997/98
- Kenroy Williams, 2004/05–2017/18
- Lionel Williams, 1956/57–1964/65
- Gerald Wood, 1948/49–1958/59
- Lear Wood, 1924/25
- Rupert Wood, 1933/34–1938/39
- Clarence Worme, 1899/1900
- Stanley Worme, 1905/06–1912/13
- Frank Worrell, 1941/42–1946/47
- Michael Worrell, 1982/83–1986/87

== Y ==
- Merlon Yarde, 1969/70
- Barrington Yearwood, 2008/09
- Dwayne Yearwood, 2008/09
- Lawrence Yearwood, 1910/11
- Rondelle Yearwood, 2000
