= Packer (surname) =

Packer is a surname. Notable people with this surname include:

== Business ==
- Asa Packer (1805–1879), American businessman and founder of Lehigh University
- Frank Packer (1906–1974), Australian media proprietor
- James Packer (born 1967), Australian businessman and investor
- Kerry Packer (1937–2005), Australian media magnate
- R. C. Packer (1879–1934), Australian businessman

== Entertainment ==
=== Acting ===
- David Packer (actor) (born 1962), American actor
- Doris Packer (1904–1979), American actress
- John Hayman Packer (1730–1806), English actor
- Suzanne Packer (born 1962), Welsh actress
- Tina Packer (1938–2026), British stage director and actress

=== Music ===
- Charles Sandys Packer (1810–1883), Australian composer
- Erica Packer (born 1977), Australian singer and model
- Frederick Augustus Packer (1839–1902), Australian composer
- Ruth Packer (1910–2005), English opera singer

=== Other ===
- Fred L. Packer (1886–1956), American illustrator and cartoonist
- Wes Packer (born 1977), Welsh comedian
- Will Packer (born 1974), American film producer

== Military ==
- Albert G. Packer (fl. 1870s), American brigadier general, state senator, and Adjutant-General of Mississippi
- Herbert Annesley Packer (1894–1962), British naval officer
- William Packer (Major-General) (fl. 1644–1662), English soldier, preacher and politician

== Politics ==
- Clyde Packer (1935–2001), Australian businessman and politician
- Horace B. Packer (1851–1940), American politician from Pennsylvania
- John B. Packer (1824–1891), American politician from Pennsylvania
- Kelley Packer (fl. 2012–2018), American politician from Idaho
- Richard Packer (politician) (1794–1872), New Zealand politician
- Robert Packer (politician, died 1682) (1614–1692), English politician
- Robert Packer (died 1731) (1678–1731), British politician
- Winchcomb Packer (1702–1746), British politician
- William F. Packer (1807–1870), American politician from Pennsylvania

== Religion ==
- Boyd K. Packer (1924–2015), American religious leader and educator
- J. I. Packer (1926–2020), British-born Canadian theologian
- John Packer (born 1946), British Anglican bishop

== Sports ==
=== Association football (soccer) ===
- Andrew Packer (born 1980), Australian footballer
- Dick Packer (fl. 1953–1968), American soccer player
- Douglas Packer (born 1987), Brazilian footballer
- Gabi Packer (fl. 1984–1997), Israeli footballer
- Mick Packer (born 1950), English footballer

=== Cricket ===
- Charles Packer (1877–1958), Barbadian cricketer
- Edward Packer (1855–1932), Barbadian cricketer
- James Packer (cricketer) (1847 – after 1866), Barbadian cricketer

=== Rugby ===
- Harry Packer (1868–1946), Wales international rugby union player
- Lucy Packer (born 2000), Anglo-Welsh rugby union player
- Marlie Packer (born 1989), British rugby union player
- Russell Packer (born 1989), New Zealand rugby league player

=== Other ===
- Ann Packer (born 1942), English sprinter, hurdler and long jumper
- Anya Packer (born 1991), American ice hockey player
- Billy Packer (1940–2023), American college basketball commentator
- Brian Packer (1944–2021), British boxer
- Chris Packer (c. 1953 – 2013), Australian sport sailor
- Donald Packer (born 1948), Canadian water polo player
- Madison Packer (born 1991), American ice hockey player
- Walter Packer (born 1955), American gridiron football player

== Writing ==
- Ann Packer (author) (born 1959), American novelist
- George Packer (born 1960), American journalist and novelist
- Joy Packer (1905–1977), South African author
- Juliet Law Packer (born c. 1952), American television writer
- Mez Packer (born 1966), English novelist
- Mike Packer (fl. 1980s–2007), English dramatist, actor and poet
- Nancy Huddleston Packer (1925–2025), American writer of short fiction and memoir
- Vin Packer, pseudonym of the American author Marijane Meaker (1927–2022)
- ZZ Packer (born 1973), American author

== Other ==
- Alfred Packer (1842–1907), American prospector and confessed cannibal
- Craig Packer (born 1950), American biologist
- David Packer (artist) (born 1960), American and English artist
- Earl L. Packer (1894–1993), American diplomat
- Graynella Packer (fl. 1910s), American author and attorney, and early radiotelegraph operator
- Greg Packer (born 1963), American highway maintenance worker known for being quoted as a "man on the street" in periodicals and television broadcasts
- Gretel Packer (born 1965), Australian billionaire investor and philanthropist
- Herbert L. Packer (1925–1972), American legal scholar and criminologist
- Jane Packer (1959–2011), British florist
- Jennifer Packer (born 1984), American painter and educator
- Kenneth John Packer (1938–2021), British nuclear magnetic resonance (NMR) scientist
- Milton Packer (born c. 1951), American cardiologist
- Nicki Packer, Australian college professor and researcher
- Phil Packer (born 1972), British charity activist
- Philip Packer (1618–1686), English barrister and architect
- Richard Packer (civil servant), British civil servant
- Roslyn Packer (born 1937), Australian philanthropist
- Sue Packer (born 1942), Australian paediatrician and advocate for the rights of children
- Toni Packer (1927–2013), German-American Buddhist educator
- Trevor Packer, American academic

== See also ==
- Packer (disambiguation)
- Packer family, an Australian media and political family
- The Packers, an American soul group
- Todd Packer, fictional character in the American television series The Office
- Knife and Packer (Duncan McCoshan and Jem Packer), English illustrators/writers of children's books and cartoonists
- Parker (surname)
