= Hoad =

Hoad is a surname. Notable people with the surname include:

- Alexander Hoad (born 1984), Canadian football player
- Edward Hoad (1925–2012), Barbadian cricketer
- Edwin Hoad (1870–1946), Barbadian cricketer
- James Hoad (1858–1931), Australian politician
- Jenny Staley Hoad (1934–2024), Australian tennis player, wife of Lew Hoad
- John Hoad (1856–1911), Australian Army major general, 2nd Chief of the General Staff
- John Hoad (cricketer) (1891–1971), Barbadian cricketer
- Lew Hoad (1934–1994), Australian tennis player
- Sid Hoad (1890–1973), English footballer
- Teddy Hoad (1896–1986), West Indian cricketer
- Tom Hoad (born 1940), Australian water polo coach and former player
- William Hoad (1885–1920), Barbadian cricketer

== See also ==
- Cheryl Frances-Hoad (born 1980), British composer
- Hoad Monument, Ulverston, Cumbria, England
- Hoadly, another surname
