= Walcott (surname) =

Walcott is a surname. Notable people with the surname include:

- Andrew Walcott (born 1975), British sprinter
- Arthur Walcott (1857–1934), British actor of the silent era
- Bess Bolden Walcott (1886–1988), African American educator, librarian, curator and activist
- Charles Walcott (MP) (1733–1799), British politician
- Charles Doolittle Walcott (1850–1927), American invertebrate paleontologist, discovered the Burgess Shale
- Charles F. Walcott (1836–1888), American Union brevet brigadier general during the Civil War
- Clotil Walcott (1925–2007), Trinidadian trade unionist
- Clyde Walcott (1926–2006), West Indian cricketer
- Collin Walcott (1945–1984), American musician
- Daniel Walcott (born 1994), Canadian ice hockey player
- Daniella Walcott (born 1991), Trinidadian model, artistic painter, beauty pageant titleholder
- Davier Walcott (born 1990), Canadian-Grenadian footballer
- Dennis Walcott (born 1951), American Chancellor of the New York City Department of Education
- Derek Walcott (1930–2017), Saint Lucian poet, playwright, artist, Nobel laureate of the post-colonial school of English language writing
- Elizabeth Walcott-Hackshaw (born 1964), Trinidadian writer and academic
- Frank Leslie Walcott (1916–1999), Barbadian trade unionist, politician and diplomat
- Frederic C. Walcott (1869–1949), American senator
- Gabrielle Walcott (born 1984), Trinidadian artist, model, charity worker, beauty pageant titleholder
- George Walcott (1914–1964), American actor
- Gregory Walcott (1928–2015), American actor and producer
- Gregory Dexter Walcott (1869–1959), American academic and minister
- Harold Walcott (died 1995), West Indian cricket umpire
- Harry Mills Walcott (1870–1944), American painter and teacher
- Jacob Walcott (born 1992), English footballer
- Jennifer Walcott (born 1977), American glamour model and actress, Playboy playmate
- Jerome Walcott (born 1957), Barbadian diplomat and politician
- Jersey Joe Walcott (1914–1994), born Arnold Raymond Cream, world heavyweight boxing champion - often compared to former world welterweight champion Barbados Joe Walcott, thus nicknamed Jersey Joe Walcott
- Joe Walcott (1873–1935), Bajan boxer
- John Edward Walcott (1790–1868), British naval officer and politician
- Keith Walcott (1924–2006), Barbadian cricketer
- Keshorn Walcott (born 1993), Trinidadian javelin thrower
- Leslie Walcott (1894–1984), West Indian cricketer who played for Barbados
- Louis Eugene Walcott (born 1933), known as Louis Farrakhan, American religious leader
- Mackenzie Walcott (1821–1880), English clergyman, known as an ecclesiologist and antiquarian
- Malachi Fagan-Walcott (born 2002), English footballer
- Mary Walcott (1675–c. 1752), one of the "afflicted" girls called as a witness at the Salem witch trials
- Mary Vaux Walcott (1860–1940), American artist and naturalist
- Michael Walcott (born 1952), Barbadian cricketer
- Nate Walcott (born 1978), American musician
- Nia Walcott (born 1993), American-raised Trinidadian footballer
- Revée Walcott-Nolan (born 1995), British middle-distance runner
- Richard Irving Walcott (born 1933), New Zealand geologist known for his work on plate tectonics
- Rickey A. Walcott (born 1982), Barbadian-Canadian jockey
- Rinaldo Walcott (born 1965), Canadian academic and writer
- Robert Walcott (1910–1988), American historian specializing in early 18th-century English politics
- Robert John Walcott (1839–1875), Attorney-General of Western Australia (1870–1872), Chief Justice of British Honduras (1872–1875)
- Roderick Walcott (1930–2000), Saint Lucian playwright, screenwriter, painter and theatre director
- Sir Stephen Walcott (1807–1887), Commissioner of the U.K. Government Emigration Board
- Tamara Walcott (born 1983), U.S. Virgin Islander powerlifter
- Tevyn Walcott (born 1994), Barbadian cricketer
- Theo Walcott (born 1989), English footballer
- Victor Walcott (born 1962), Barbadian cricketer
- William Walcot (1874–1943), Scottish architect, graphic artist, etcher, Art Nouveau practitioner
