= Greenidge =

Greenidge is a surname. Notable people with the surname include:

- Abel Hendy Jones Greenidge (1865–1906), writer on ancient history and law
- Akil Greenidge (born 1996), English cricketer
- Alvin Greenidge (born 1956), former West Indian cricketer
- Carl Greenidge (born 1978), English cricketer
- Carl Barrington Greenidge (born 1949), vice president and minister of foreign affairs of Guyana
- Charles Wilton Wood Greenidge (1889–1972), diplomat and anti-slavery activist
- David Greenidge, Bermudian cricketer
- Ethan Greenidge (born 1997), American football player
- Geoff Greenidge (born 1948), West Indian cricketer
- Gordon Greenidge (born 1951), Barbadian cricketer
- Jordan Greenidge, (born 2000), English footballer
- Kaitlyn Greenidge, American writer
- Kerri Greenidge, American historian and academic
- Kirsten Greenidge, American playwright
- Michelle Greenidge (born 1969), British actress
- Reiss Greenidge (born 1996), English-Jamaican professional footballer
- Ricardo Greenidge (born 1971), Canadian sprinter and bobsledder
- Robert Greenidge (1950–2026), Trinidadian steelpan player
- Ronuel Greenidge (born 1983), Guyanese chess player
- Terence Lucy Greenidge (1902–1970), English author and actor
- Tyrone Greenidge (1965–1993), Barbadian cricketer
- Wesley Greenidge (born 1998), British judoka
- Whitney Greenidge, (born 1933), Barbadian cricketer
- Will Greenidge (born 2002), English footballer

== See also ==
- Greenidge Elliott (1861–1895), Barbadian cricketer
- Greenidge Generation power plant
