= Francis Speed =

Francis Speed may refer to:

- Francis Speed (Barbadian cricketer) (1849–1906), Barbadian cricketer
- Francis Speed (English cricketer) (1859–1928), English cricketer
