= Edward Evelyn =

Edward Evelyn may refer to:

- Edward Evelyn (politician)
- Edward Evelyn (footballer)
- Edward Evelyn (cricketer)
