= Lewis and Clark and George =

- Directed by: Rod McCall
- Written by: Rod McCall
- Produced by: Dan Gunther; J. Todd Harris
- Starring: Rose McGowan; Salvator Xuereb; Dan Gunther; Art LaFleur; Aki Aleong; James Brolin; Paul Bartel
- Cinematography: Michael Mayers
- Edited by: Ed Marx
- Music by: Ben Vaughn
- Production companies: Davis Entertainment Classics; Dark Matter Productions
- Distributed by: BMG Video
- Release date: October 4, 1997
- Running time: 82 minutes
- Country: United States
- Language: English

Lewis and Clark and George is a 1997 comedy crime thriller film directed by Rod McCall.

== Plot ==
Lewis and Clark and George opens with Lewis (Salvator Xuereb) and Clark (Dan Gunther) Clark at a water tank site wearing prison jump suits. The scene is desert scrub and the two state prison escapees have just located a buried metal box with a loaded revolver, treasure map, and Cuban cigars. A road trip begins as the two hike off through the desert to find the treasure, eventually joined by George (Rose McGowan).

== Cast ==
- Rose McGowan as George
- Dan Gunther as Clark
- Salvator Xuereb as Lewis
- Aki Aleong as Chang
- Paul Bartel as Cop
- E. E. Bell as Mailman
- James Brolin as Reverend Red
- Richard Butterfield as Pickup Cowboy
- Tamara Clatterbuck as Blond Hooker
- Destiny Esposito as Gun Girl
- Jerry Gardner as Yo-Yo Man
- Art LaFleur as Fred
- Suzanne Mari as Nefertiti
- Corrinne Michaels as NY Tourist
- Delana Michaels as NY Tourist
- Ruben Moreno as Old Man
- Paula Sorge as Tamee
- Holly Riddle as Betty
- Brian Taylor as Boyfriend
