= John Kidney =

John Kidney may refer to:

- John Kidney (hurler) (1871–?), Irish hurler
- John Kidney (cricketer) (1888–1962), Barbadian cricketer
