= Henry Burnett =

Henry Burnett may refer to:

- Henry Cornelius Burnett (1825–1866), Kentucky politician
- Henry John Burnett (1942–1963), Scottish murderer
- Henry Lawrence Burnett (1838–1916), Union general
- Henry Burnett (cricketer) (born 1851), Barbadian cricketer
- Henry Burnett (footballer), English footballer

== See also ==
- Harry Burnett Lumsden (1821–1896), British military officer in India
