= Trevor Campbell =

Trevor Campbell may refer to:

- Trevor Campbell (cricketer) (born 1950), Barbadian cricketer
- Trevor Campbell (sprinter) (born 1954), Jamaican sprinter
