= Don Browne =

Don Browne may refer to:

- Don Browne (cricketer) (1892–1975), Barbadian cricketer
- Don Browne (television executive) (1943–2023), American media executive

== See also ==
- Donald Brown (disambiguation)
