= Eustace Smith =

Eustace Smith may refer to

- Eustace Smith (cricketer) (born 1877), Barbadian cricketer
- Cecil Elaine Eustace Smith (1908–1997), Canadian figure skater
- St Osyth Mahala Wood (née Eustace-Smith, 1886–1970), English philanthropist
- Thomas Eustace Smith (1831–1903), English shipping magnate and politician
