= Waithe (surname) =

Waithe is a surname. Notable people with the surname include:

- Amir Waithe (born 1989), Panamanian football player
- Gladstone Waithe (1902–1979), Barbadian cricketer
- Keith Waithe, British musician
- Lena Waithe (born 1984), American screenwriter, producer and actress
- Stann Waithe (born 1985), Trinidadian sprinter
