= Thomas Speed =

Thomas Speed may refer to:

- Thomas Speed (politician) (1768–1842), U.S. Representative from Kentucky
- Thomas Speed (Quaker) (1623–1703), preacher, merchant and Quaker
- Thomas Speed (cashier), chief cashier of the Bank of England, 1694–99
- Thomas Speed (cricketer) (1843-1896), Barbadian cricketer
