= Dave Marshall (Barbadian cricketer) =

Barbadian cricketer

Personal information
- Full name: Dave Kerwin Marshall
- Born: 24 May 1972 (age 54); Saint Michael, Barbados
- Batting: Right handed
- Bowling: Right-arm leg spin
- Role: Bowler

Domestic team information
- Years: Team
- 1992/93–2000/01: Barbados cricket team
- Source: Cricinfo, 13 November 2020

Dave Kerwin Marshall (born 24 May 1972) is a Barbadian former cricketer. A leg spinner bowler, he played in 27 first-class and six List A matches for the Barbados cricket team from 1993 to 2001.

Marshall made his first-class debut for Barbados against Jamaica in 1993, playing two further matches in that season's Red Stripe Cup. After four years out of the team, he returned for a fixture with the touring Indian team where he took figures of 6/62 in their first innings. Despite that performance he was overlooked by the West Indies Cricket Board when they ran a leg-spinners coaching clinic later that year. Marshall made occasional appearances over the next few seasons as Barbados generally preferred left-arm spinner Winston Reid. In 1999–2000, Marshall enjoyed his best season taking 28 wickets at an average of 16.17, he was the team's leading wicket-taker and third highest in that year's Busta Cup. That season also saw Marshall record his career best figures of 7/49 against the Windward Islands, taking four further wickets in the second innings to be named man of the match. He was less consistent the following season and made his final first-class appearance against the Leeward Islands.

Marshall played club cricket in England for Vauxhall Mallards from 1999 to 2001. An attempt to join them in 1998 had to be aborted after he was denied a work permit.

After his playing career, Marshall has coached the Barbados club side Spartans.

== See also ==
- List of Barbadian representative cricketers
