= Winston Greenidge =

Barbadian cricketer (1929–2018)

Personal information
- Full name: John Winston Greenidge
- Born: 15 March 1929; Saint Michael, Barbados
- Died: 2 October 2018 (aged 89)
- Batting: Right-handed
- Bowling: Right-arm off-break

Domestic team information
- Years: Team
- 1951/52: Barbados cricket team
- Source: Cricinfo, 13 November 2020

John Winston Greenidge (15 March 1929 – 2 October 2018) was a Barbadian cricketer. He played in two first-class matches for the Barbados cricket team in 1951. His brother, Whitney, also played first-class cricket for Barbados.

== See also ==
- List of Barbadian representative cricketers
