= Neville Grell =

English cricketer and British Army officer

Personal information
- Full name: Ellis Louis George Neville Grell
- Born: 24 December 1890; Trinidad
- Died: 5 June 1918 (aged 27); Landour, United Provinces, British India
- Batting: Unknown

Domestic team information
- Years: Team
- 1910/11: Trinidad
- 1910/11: Marylebone Cricket Club

Career statistics
Competition	First-class
Matches	2
Runs scored	51
Batting average	12.75
100s/50s	–/–
Top score	25
Catches/stumpings	1/–
- Source: Cricinfo, 31 March 2021

Ellis Louis George Neville Grell (24 December 1890 – 5 June 1918) was an English first-class cricketer and an officer in the Canadian, British and British Indian Army.

The son of Ellis Grell senior, he was born at Trinidad in December 1890. He was educated in Trinidad at Saint Mary's College, before being sent to England to continue his education at Wellington College and Clifton College, leaving the latter in 1908. He played first-class cricket back in Trinidad, playing for Trinidad in the final of the Inter-Colonial Tournament against Barbados in September 1910 at Georgetown in British Guiana. He made scores of 1 and 8 in the match, being dismissed by Stanley Worme and Snuffy Browne respectively. In March of the following year, he played in a second first-class match for the touring Marylebone Cricket Club side, captained by Arthur Somerset, against Trinidad at Port-of-Spain. He fared better batting than in his previous match, making scores of 17 and 25, for which he was dismissed by Joseph Rogers and George John respectively. Grell emigrated to Canada, where he held a commission in the British Columbia Horse. During his time in North America, he also played club cricket in the United States for Staten Island Cricket Club.

At the start of the First World War in July 1914, Grell resigned his commission with the British Columbia Horse and transferred to Lord Strathcona's Horse, travelling to England in early 1915. He gained a commission as a second lieutenant in the British Army in February 1915, joining the West Yorkshire Regiment in November 1915. Grell was seriously wounded in action at Ypres in October 1916 and was sent away from the front to recover. While recovering he was promoted to lieutenant in July 1917. He did not recover sufficiently enough to return to the Western Front, instead being sent to British India in August 1917 where he joined the 27th Punjabis. Grell became ill while serving at Landour and was taken to the military hospital there for treatment, but died a short time later on 5 June 1918.
