= Lawrence Maxwell =

Lawrence Maxwell may refer to:

- Lawrence Maxwell (cricketer), Barbadian cricketer
- Lawrence Maxwell Jr., American politician and lawyer
