= Cecil Belfield Clarke =

Barbadian-English physician and Pan-Africanist (1894–1970)

- Clarke, date unknown
- Born: 12 April 1894; Barbados
- Died: 28 November 1970 (aged 76); St Stephen's Hospital, Barnet, London
- Education: Combermere School, Barbados; St Catharine's College, University of Cambridge
- Occupation: Physician
- Known for: Pan-Africanist, a founder of the League of Coloured Peoples

Cecil Belfield Clarke (also known as Belfield Clarke) (12 April 1894 – 28 November 1970) was a Barbadian-born physician who qualified in the United Kingdom and practised near the Elephant & Castle in London. He was a Pan-Africanist and was one of the founders of the League of Coloured Peoples in 1931.

== Early life ==
Little is known of Clarke's early life. He attended Combermere School in Barbados. He won an island scholarship to study medicine at Cambridge University. He arrived in London on 28 September 1914, just after the outbreak of World War I, having travelled on the RMS Tagus, which, after this journey, became a hospital ship. Other passengers included Aucher Warner, cricketer and future Attorney-General of Trinidad and Tobago; the colonial administrator Herbert Peebles; Kenneth Knaggs, the son of Sir Samuel Knaggs, the Colonial Secretary of Trinidad and Tobago at the time; Roland Allport, a medical practitioner; Thomas Orford, the Government medical officer for Grenada; and Richard Batson, who played cricket for Barbados and qualified as a medical practitioner in Edinburgh, Scotland, in 1920.

== Career ==
Clarke went to St Catharine's College, Cambridge, and was awarded a BA in 1917. He remained a devoted member of the college community, being President of the College Society in 1965–66 and thereafter one of the vice-presidents until his death in 1970. He endowed a prize for Natural Sciences, which was first awarded in 1955. The Belfield Clarke Prize is still awarded by the college.

Clarke qualified in 1918 with the Conjoint Diploma (MRCS (Eng) and LRCP (Lond)), in 1919 as DPH, in 1920 as BChir, and in 1921 as FRCS (Edin) and MB (Cambridge). In 1923, he was in London at University College Hospital. By at least 1924 he was practising in Southwark at 112 Newington Causeway SE1, where he would practise for the rest of his professional career, although he may have practised there as early as 1920.

He practised at Newington Causeway throughout World War II, despite the heavy bombardment of the area. In 1941, the area was so badly bombed that 112 Newington Causeway remained the only building standing in the row of shops and houses; one wall of his surgery was open to the elements. At the time of the 1950 Ordnance Survey, 112 Newington Causeway remained on its own, surrounded by bombsites. Clarke retired in 1965, and 112 Newington Causeway was demolished after that.

He was a member of the Council of the British Medical Association from 1954 to 1967.

=== Clark's rule ===
Clarke developed the misnamed Clark's rule, a mathematical formula used to calculate the proper dosage of medicine for children aged 2–17.

== Pan-Africanism ==
Clarke was one of the founders of the civil-rights organization the League of Coloured Peoples along with another South London medical practitioner, Harold Moody, in 1931, and was a member of the League's executive committee. Other early members included C. L. R. James, Jomo Kenyatta, Una Marson, and Paul Robeson. Clarke hosted garden parties at his house in Barnet for the League.

He was elected the first chair of the House Committee of Aggrey House, a hostel established in London in 1934 for students from Africa and the Caribbean.

In the 1930s Clarke was also active in the International African Service Bureau, with C. L. R. James and George Padmore, a London-based organisation intended to address issues relating to Africa and the African diaspora.

Clarke wrote the obituary for the Pan-Africanist activist George Padmore in The Times in 1959. He was active in the West African Students' Union (WASU), which helped influence Ghanaian nationalism. Through WASU, Clarke became acquainted with the American Pan-Africanist W. E. B. Du Bois. The University of Massachusetts Amherst holds Du Bois's papers, which include an extensive correspondence with Clarke. The letters invariably end "with greetings to Pat". Clarke was active in Ghanaian medical circles: he was Chairman of the Ghana Medical Advisory Committee, and wrote letters to the British Medical Journal (BMJ) about independent Ghana's first medical school, the University of Ghana Medical School.

Clarke kept an open house for West Indians at his home in Barnet on Sunday afternoons.

== Personal life ==
Clarke was homosexual. As was usual before decriminalisation in 1967, Clarke was discreet. His lifelong partner was Pat Walker (Edward George Walker, 1902–1999), whom Clarke employed as his secretary. By at least 1939, they were living together in Clarke's house in Barnet, which Clarke called Belfield House, but they had both been on the electoral register at 112 Newington Causeway in 1929. After Clarke's death, Walker remained at Belfield House, but after the latter's death in 1999, it was left to St Catharine's College. The college has since sold the house, and it is now a nursery, Belfield Montessori.

Clarke died in 1970, aged 76, at St Stephen's Hospital, Barnet. (St Stephen's was a geriatric hospital that closed in 1989. Clarke's obituary in the BMJ incorrectly states that he died in Barnet General Hospital.)

== Legacy ==
A blue plaque honouring Clarke was placed on a building near the site of his practice in April 2023, sponsored by Black History Walks in collaboration with the Nubian Jak Community Trust. The prize that Clarke endowed at St Catharine's College, Cambridge, continues to be awarded. He was one of the Black Londoners featured in an exhibition at the Cuming Museum in 2008, curated by the historian Stephen Bourne, Keep Smiling Through: Black Londoners on the Home Front, 1939 to 1945.

Belfield Clarke was one of the figures highlighted by LGBT History Month UK in February 2024, in connection to that year's theme: Medicine.

On 21 March 2025, the central open space of the new "town centre" in Elephant and Castle was officially named Belfield Clarke Square, with the unveiling of a plaque by the Mayor of Southwark and the Deputy High Commissioner of Barbados.
