= Michael Inniss =

Barbadian cricketer (born 1965)

Personal information
- Born: 15 January 1965 (age 61); Saint Michael, Barbados
- Source: Cricinfo, 13 November 2020

Michael Inniss (born 15 January 1965) is a Barbadian cricketer. He played in one List A and four first-class matches for the Barbados cricket team from 1985 to 1989.

== See also ==
- List of Barbadian representative cricketers
