= Russell Griffiths (cricketer) =

Barbadian cricketer

Personal information
- Born: 19 July 1909; Saint Michael, Barbados
- Source: Cricinfo, 13 November 2020

Russell Griffiths (born 19 July 1909, date of death unknown) was a Barbadian cricketer. He played in one first-class match for the Barbados cricket team in 1933/34.

== See also ==
- List of Barbadian representative cricketers
