= Anthony Johnson (cricketer) =

Barbadian cricketer (born 1964)

Personal information
- Born: 12 August 1964 (age 62); Saint James, Barbados
- Source: Cricinfo, 13 November 2020

Anthony Johnson (born 12 August 1964) is a Barbadian cricketer. He played in six first-class and six List A matches for the Barbados cricket team from 1987 to 1990.

== See also ==
- List of Barbadian representative cricketers
