= Corey Glasgow =

Barbadian cricketer (born 1979)

Personal information
- Born: 20 March 1979 (age 47); Bairds Village, Barbados
- Source: Cricinfo, 13 November 2020

Corey Glasgow (born 20 March 1979) is a Barbadian cricketer. He played in two first-class matches for the Barbados cricket team in 1999/00 and 2000/01.

== See also ==
- List of Barbadian representative cricketers
