= Joseph Phillips (Barbadian cricketer) =

Barbadian cricketer (1891–1958)

Personal information
- Born: 28 July 1891; Saint John, Barbados
- Died: 10 December 1958 (aged 67); Edinburgh, Scotland
- Source: Cricinfo, 13 November 2020

Joseph Phillips (28 July 1891 – 10 December 1958) was a Barbadian cricketer. He played in four first-class matches for the Barbados cricket team from 1919 to 1923.

== See also ==
- List of Barbadian representative cricketers
