= Leonard Horne =

Barbadian cricketer

Personal information
- Born: 14 September 1978; Wallingford, England
- Died: after 1925; Jamaica
- Source: Cricinfo, 13 November 2020

Leonard Horne (born 14 September 1878, died after 1925) was a Barbadian cricketer. He played in two first-class match for the Barbados cricket team in 1901/02.

== See also ==
- List of Barbadian representative cricketers
