= Rohan Nurse =

Barbadian cricketer (born 1983)

Personal information
- Born: 21 August 1983 (age 43); Barbados
- Batting: Right-handed
- Bowling: Right-arm offbreak
- Source: Cricinfo, 13 November 2020

Rohan Nurse (born 21 August 1983) is a Barbadian cricketer. He played in six first-class matches for the Barbados cricket team in 2009.

== See also ==
- List of Barbadian representative cricketers
