= Donald McAuley =

Barbadian cricketer (1867–1912)

Personal information
- Born: 25 April 1867; Saint Michael, Barbados
- Died: 27 January 1912 (aged 44); Saint Michael, Barbados
- Source: Cricinfo, 13 November 2020

Donald McAuley (25 April 1867 – 27 January 1912) was a Barbadian cricketer. He played in nineteen first-class matches for the Barbados cricket team from 1887 to 1898.

== See also ==
- List of Barbadian representative cricketers
