= Oswald Gilkes =

Barbadian cricketer (1892–1932)

Personal information
- Born: 25 February 1892; Saint Michael, Barbados
- Died: 21 November 1932 (aged 40); Brighton, England
- Source: Cricinfo, 13 November 2020

Oswald Gilkes (25 February 1892 – 21 November 1932) was a Barbadian cricketer. He played in one first-class match for the Barbados cricket team in 1919/20.

== See also ==
- List of Barbadian representative cricketers
