= Theodore Birkett =

Barbadian cricketer

Personal information
- Born: 14 April 1918; Saint Michael, Barbados
- Source: Cricinfo, 11 November 2020

Theodore Birkett (born 14 April 1918, date of death unknown) was a Barbadian cricketer. He played in two first-class matches for the Barbados cricket team in 1942/43 and 1956/57.

== See also ==
- List of Barbadian representative cricketers
