= Cecil Bradshaw =

Barbadian cricketer (born 1928)

Personal information
- Born: 2 July 1928; Saint Joseph, Barbados
- Source: Cricinfo, 11 November 2020

Cecil St. Clair Bradshaw (born 2 July 1928) was a Barbadian cricketer. He played in one first-class match for the Barbados cricket team in 1951/52.

== See also ==
- List of Barbadian representative cricketers
