= Kenneth Branker =

Barbadian cricketer (1932–2021)

Personal information
- Full name: Kenneth Augustus Branker
- Born: 23 October 1932; Saint Michael, Barbados
- Died: 5 December 2021 (aged 89)
- Batting: Right-handed
- Bowling: Right-arm leg break Right-arm off-break

Domestic team information
- Years: Team
- 1951/52, 1955/56: Barbados
- Source: Cricinfo, 11 November 2020

Kenneth Augustus Branker (23 October 1932 – 5 December 2021) was a Barbadian cricketer. He played in two first-class matches for the Barbados cricket team in 1951/52 and 1955/56.

Branker died on 5 December 2021, at the age of 89.

== See also ==
- List of Barbadian representative cricketers
