= Leon Foster =

Barbadian cricketer (1913–1991)

Personal information
- Born: 9 June 1913; Saint Michael, Barbados
- Died: 19 April 1991 (aged 77); Auckland, New Zealand
- Source: Cricinfo, 13 November 2020

Leon Foster (9 June 1913 – 19 April 1991) was a Barbadian cricketer. He played in two first-class matches for the Barbados cricket team in 1931/32 and 1935/36.

== See also ==
- List of Barbadian representative cricketers
