= Hughley Barker =

Barbadian cricketer (1925–1994)

Personal information
- Born: 27 June 1925; Saint Michael, Barbados
- Died: April 1994
- Source: Cricinfo, 11 November 2020

Hughley Barker (27 June 1925 – April 1994) was a Barbadian cricketer. He played in four first-class matches for the Barbados cricket team from 1951 to 1956.

== See also ==
- List of Barbadian representative cricketers
