= Gerald Wood =

Barbadian cricketer (born 1926)

Personal information
- Full name: Gerald Lear Wood
- Born: 7 March 1926; Vaucluse, Saint Thomas, Barbados
- Batting: Right-handed
- Role: Wicket-keeper

Domestic team information
- Years: Team
- 1948-49 to 1958-59: Barbados

Career statistics
| Competition | First-class |
|---|---|
| Matches | 7 |
| Runs scored | 158 |
| Batting average | 26.33 |
| 100s/50s | 0/1 |
| Top score | 53 |
| Balls bowled | – |
| Wickets | – |
| Bowling average | – |
| 5 wickets in innings | – |
| 10 wickets in match | – |
| Best bowling | – |
| Catches/stumpings | 10/5 |
- Source: Cricinfo, 9 June 2018

Gerald Lear Wood (born 7 March 1926) is a Barbadian former cricketer who played first-class cricket for Barbados from 1949 to 1959.

== Biography ==
Wood attended Harrison College in Bridgetown. A wicket-keeper and useful batsman, he made his first-class debut in 1949, and was Barbados's regular wicket-keeper for three years. He made a final first-class appearance in 1959, against British Guiana, when he made 53, his highest score.

His father, Lear Wood, a prominent figure in Barbados cricket for many years, played one first-class match for Barbados in 1925.
