= Edward Jackman =

Barbadian cricketer (1866–1956)

Personal information
- Born: 28 June 1866; Saint Michael, Barbados
- Died: 4 December 1956 (aged 90); Saint Michael, Barbados
- Source: Cricinfo, 13 November 2020

Edward Jackman (28 June 1866 – 4 December 1956) was a Barbadian cricketer. He played in seven first-class matches for the Barbados cricket team from 1887 to 1898.

== See also ==
- List of Barbadian representative cricketers
