= Cuthbert Crick =

Barbadian cricketer (1920–1991)

Personal information
- Born: 24 October 1920; Barbados
- Died: 1991 (aged 70–71); St Lucia
- Source: Cricinfo, 13 November 2020

Cuthbert Crick (24 October 1920 – 1991) was a Barbadian cricketer. He played in two first-class matches for the Barbados cricket team in 1940/41.

== See also ==
- List of Barbadian representative cricketers
