= Leo Hutchinson =

Barbadian cricketer (1896–1977)

Personal information
- Born: 9 October 1896; Saint Joseph, Barbados
- Died: 27 March 1977 (aged 80); Saint Michael, Barbados
- Source: Cricinfo, 13 November 2020

Leo Hutchinson (9 October 1896 – 27 March 1977) was a Barbadian cricketer. He played in two first-class matches for the Barbados cricket team in 1925/26 and 1929/30.

== See also ==
- List of Barbadian representative cricketers
