= Richard Straker =

Barbadian cricketer (born 1951)

Personal information
- Born: 4 August 1951 (age 75); Christ Church, Barbados
- Source: Cricinfo, 17 November 2020

Richard Straker (born 4 August 1951) is a former Barbadian cricketer. He played eight first-class and four List A matches for the Barbados cricket team between 1976 and 1979.

== See also ==
- List of Barbadian representative cricketers
