= Nichollas Archer =

Barbadian cricketer

Personal information
- Born: 23 July 1887; Saint Lucy, Barbados
- Source: Cricinfo, 11 November 2020

Nichollas Archer (born 23 July 1887, date of death unknown) was a Barbadian cricketer. He played in one first-class match for the Barbados cricket team in 1912/13.

== See also ==
- List of Barbadian representative cricketers
