= Robert Jones (Barbadian cricketer) =

Barbadian cricketer (1886–1951)

Personal information
- Born: 1 March 1886; Saint Michael, Barbados
- Died: 20 May 1951 (aged 65); Saint Michael, Barbados
- Source: Cricinfo, 13 November 2020

Robert Jones (1 March 1886 – 20 May 1951) was a Barbadian cricketer. He played in one first-class match for the Barbados cricket team in 1911/12.

== See also ==
- List of Barbadian representative cricketers
