= Oliver Broome =

Barbadian cricketer (born 1937)

Personal information
- Born: 6 February 1937 (age 89); Saint Peter, Barbados
- Source: Cricinfo, 11 November 2020

Oliver Broome (born 6 February 1937) is a Barbadian cricketer. He played in one first-class match for the Barbados cricket team in 1964/65.

== See also ==
- List of Barbadian representative cricketers
