= Barrington Yearwood =

Barbadian cricket

Personal information
- Full name: Barrington Bjorn Beckenbauer Yearwood
- Born: 18 August 1986 (age 40); St Peter, Barbados
- Batting: Left-handed
- Bowling: Right arm fast-medium

Domestic team information
- Years: Team
- 2008/09: Barbados

Career statistics
Competition	FC	LA
Matches	1	2
Runs scored	56	0
Batting average	28.00	0.00
100s/50s	0/0	0/0
Top score	32	0
Balls bowled	54	31
Wickets	0	1
Bowling average	–	29.00
5 wickets in innings	0	0
10 wickets in match	0	N/A
Best bowling	–	1/25
Catches/stumpings	0/0	0/0
- Source: CricketArchive, 24 February 2009

Barrington Bjorn Beckenbauer Yearwood (born 18 August 1986) is a Barbadian cricketer, similar in his short build to West Indies international Tino Best.

Yearwood caught the eye in August 2003 when he took 7/37 for Barbados Under-19s against their Leeward Islands equivalents in the TCL Regional Under 19 Challenge; his captain Martin Nurse said that Yearwood had bowled with both pace and swing, and had bowled "very, very well"; while Yearwood himself said that he had "big goals" he wanted to achieve.

He made his debut in List A cricket in early October 2003, when he represented West Indies Under-19s against Antigua and Barbuda in the 2003–04 Red Stripe Bowl. The match did not bring any success for him: he was out for nought as his team were dismissed for just 69, and bowled one ball – the last of the match – which went for four. A few days later he played in the same competition against the University of the West Indies. He did not bat, but took a single wicket, that of Jason Parris. As of February 2009 these remain his only List A appearances.

In 2003/04 he was picked for the West Indies Under-19s' tour of Sri Lanka and the subsequent Under-19 World Cup in Bangladesh, and played in three Youth ODIs. His best bowling return in these matches was the 4/35 he claimed against Sri Lanka Under-19s in early February 2004. However, after this handful of appearances he never again played at this level.

In 2007 Yearwood played club cricket in Ireland for Leinster Cricket Club. His most notable performance for the team came in early May, when he took 5/18 against Munster Reds. This feat helped Leinster record an easy nine-wicket victory, but it was all for naught as they were docked ten points for fielding an ineligible player.

In Barbadian domestic cricket, Yearwood showed his batting ability in 2008, when he struck 153 from 118 balls for CGI Maple against Banks. He finally made his first-class debut at the end of January 2009, when he was selected to play in the Regional Four Day Competition for Barbados against Jamaica at Trelawny. Batting at nine in both innings, he made useful scores of 32 and 24, but he went wicketless from his nine overs.
