= Hilton Hinds =

Barbadian cricketer (1889–?)

Personal information
- Born: 13 November 1889; Saint George, Barbados
- Source: Cricinfo, 13 November 2020

Hilton Hinds (born 13 November 1889 — ?) was a Barbadian cricketer. He played in one first-class match for the Barbados cricket team in 1907/08.

== See also ==
- List of Barbadian representative cricketers
