= Gustavus Cox =

Barbadian cricketer (1870–1958)

Personal information
- Born: 30 May 1870; Saint Michael, Barbados
- Died: 9 September 1958 (aged 88); Port of Spain, Trinidad
- Source: Cricinfo, 13 November 2020

Gustavus Cox (30 May 1870 – 9 September 1958) was a Barbadian cricketer. He played in eighteen first-class matches for the Barbados cricket team from 1893 to 1905.

== See also ==
- List of Barbadian representative cricketers
