= Luther Barrow =

Barbadian cricketer (1876–1933)

Personal information
- Born: 19 May 1876; Saint Michael, Barbados
- Died: 15 February 1933 (aged 56); Saint Michael, Barbados
- Source: Cricinfo, 11 November 2020

Luther Barrow (19 May 1876 – 15 February 1933) was a Barbadian cricketer. He played in three first-class matches for the Barbados cricket team in 1904/05 and 1905/06.

== See also ==
- List of Barbadian representative cricketers
