= Anthony Mayers =

Barbadian cricketer (born 1937)

Personal information
- Born: 15 July 1937 (age 89); Saint John, Barbados
- Source: Cricinfo, 13 November 2020

Anthony Mayers (born 15 July 1937) is a Barbadian cricketer. He played in two first-class matches for the Barbados cricket team in 1954/55 and 1955/56.

== See also ==
- List of Barbadian representative cricketers
