= John Edwards (Barbadian cricketer) =

Barbadian cricketer (1909–1976)

Personal information
- Born: 15 August 1909; Christ Church, Barbados
- Died: 12 July 1976 (aged 66); Saint Michael, Barbados
- Source: Cricinfo, 13 November 2020

John Edwards (15 August 1909 – 12 July 1976) was a Barbadian cricketer. He played in six first-class matches for the Barbados cricket team from 1931 to 1938.

== See also ==
- List of Barbadian representative cricketers
