= John Brathwaite =

Barbadian cricketer

Personal information
- Born: 24 February 1872; Saint John, Barbados
- Source: Cricinfo, 11 November 2020

John Brathwaite (born 24 February 1872, date of death unknown) was a Barbadian cricketer. He played in three first-class matches for the Barbados cricket team in 1891/92.

== See also ==
- List of Barbadian representative cricketers
