= Harold Skeete =

Barbadian cricketer (1892–1972)

Personal information
- Born: 13 December 1892; Christ Church, Barbados
- Died: 18 August 1972 (aged 79); Saint Michael, Barbados
- Source: Cricinfo, 17 November 2020

Harold Skeete (13 December 1892 – 18 August 1972) was a Barbadian cricketer. He played in two first-class matches for the Barbados cricket team in 1924/25 and 1928/29.

== See also ==
- List of Barbadian representative cricketers
