= Shane Ramsay (cricketer) =

Barbadian cricketer (born 1985)

Personal information
- Born: 3 December 1985 (age 40); Barbados
- Source: Cricinfo, 13 November 2020

Shane Ramsay (born 3 December 1985) is a Barbadian cricketer. He played in two first-class matches for the Barbados cricket team in 2009.

== See also ==
- List of Barbadian representative cricketers
