= Thomas Roberts (cricketer) =

Barbadian cricketer (1880–1976)

Personal information
- Born: 27 April 1880; Saint Michael, Barbados
- Died: 13 July 1976 (aged 96); Lambeth, England
- Source: Cricinfo, 13 November 2020

Thomas Roberts (27 April 1880 – 13 July 1976) was a Barbadian cricketer. He played in four first-class matches for the Barbados cricket team in 1896/97 and 1897/98.

== See also ==
- List of Barbadian representative cricketers
