= Lionel Williams =

Barbadian cricketer (born 1937)

Personal information
- Born: 26 November 1937 (age 88); Saint Michael, Barbados
- Source: Cricinfo, 17 November 2020

Lionel Williams (born 26 November 1937) is a Barbadian cricketer. He played in two first-class matches for the Barbados cricket team in 1956/57 and 1964/65.

== See also ==
- List of Barbadian representative cricketers
