= Frederick Archer (cricketer) =

Barbadian cricketer (1888–1937)

Personal information
- Born: 21 November 1888; Christ Church, Barbados
- Died: 12 May 1937 (aged 48); Saint George, Grenada
- Source: Cricinfo, 11 November 2020

Frederick Archer (21 November 1888 – 12 May 1937) was a Barbadian cricketer. He played in thirteen first-class matches for the Barbados cricket team from 1907 to 1926.

== See also ==
- List of Barbadian representative cricketers
