= Harold Griffith (Barbadian cricketer) =

Barbadian cricketer (1921–2004)

Personal information
- Born: 21 June 1921; Saint Michael, Barbados
- Died: 6 November 2004 (aged 83); Saint Michael, Barbados
- Source: Cricinfo, 13 November 2020

Harold Griffith (21 June 1921 – 6 November 2004) was a Barbadian cricketer. He played in nine first-class matches for the Barbados cricket team from 1943 to 1947.

== See also ==
- List of Barbadian representative cricketers
