= Mark Sealy (cricketer) =

Barbadian cricketer (born 1961)

Personal information
- Born: 24 August 1961 (age 65); Saint Michael, Barbados
- Source: Cricinfo, 17 November 2020

Mark Sealy (born 24 August 1961) is a Barbadian cricketer. He played in one List A and two first-class matches for the Barbados cricket team in 1988/89.

== See also ==
- List of Barbadian representative cricketers
