= Samuel Browne (cricketer) =

Barbadian cricketer

Personal information
- Born: 3 August 1844; Saint Philip, Barbados
- Source: Cricinfo, 11 November 2020

Samuel Browne (born 3 August 1844, date of death unknown) was a Barbadian cricketer. He played in three first-class matches for the Barbados cricket team from 1864 to 1872.

== See also ==
- List of Barbadian representative cricketers
