= Ernest Skeete =

Barbadian cricketer (1865–1939)

Personal information
- Born: 4 June 1865; Saint Philip, Barbados
- Died: 14 August 1939 (aged 74); Saint Andrew, Barbados
- Source: Cricinfo, 17 November 2020

Ernest Skeete (4 June 1865 – 14 August 1939) was a Barbadian cricketer. He played in three first-class matches for the Barbados cricket team from 1883 to 1888.

== See also ==
- List of Barbadian representative cricketers
