= Richard Smith (Barbadian cricketer) =

Barbadian cricketer (1873–1954)

Personal information
- Born: 2 February 1873; Saint George, Barbados
- Died: 10 June 1954 (aged 81); Saint Michael, Barbados
- Source: Cricinfo, 17 November 2020

Richard Smith (2 February 1873 – 10 June 1954) was a Barbadian cricketer. He played in two first-class matches for the Barbados cricket team in 1893/94.

== See also ==
- List of Barbadian representative cricketers
