= Richard Parris =

Barbadian Barbadian cricketer (born 1845)

Personal information
- Born: 13 December 1845; Saint Thomas, Barbados
- Source: Cricinfo, 13 November 2020

Richard Parris (born 13 December 1845, date of death unknown) was a Barbadian cricketer. He played in two first-class matches for the Barbados cricket team in 1864/65 and 1865/66.

== See also ==
- List of Barbadian representative cricketers
