= Peter Thompson (cricketer) =

Barbadian cricketer (born 1965)

Personal information
- Born: 12 March 1965 (age 61); Saint James, Barbados
- Source: Cricinfo, 17 November 2020

Peter Thompson (born 12 March 1965) is a Barbadian cricketer. He played in two first-class and four List A matches for the Barbados cricket team in 1992/93 and 1993/94.

== See also ==
- List of Barbadian representative cricketers
