= Charlie Taylor (cricketer) =

Barbadian cricketer (1918–2000)

Personal information
- Full name: Alfred MacDonald Taylor
- Born: 5 April 1918; Saint Michael, Barbados
- Died: 9 May 2000 (aged 82); Oakville, Ontario, Canada
- Relatives: Alfred Taylor (son)
- Source: Cricinfo, 17 November 2020

Charlie Taylor (5 April 1918 – 9 May 2000) was a Barbadian cricketer. He played in sixteen first-class matches for the Barbados cricket team from 1941 to 1952.

== See also ==
- List of Barbadian representative cricketers
