= Arthur Laborde =

Barbadian cricketer (1875–1951)

Personal information
- Born: 17 May 1875; Kingstown, Saint Vincent
- Died: 25 August 1951 (aged 76); Highgate, England
- Source: Cricinfo, 13 November 2020

Arthur Laborde (17 May 1875 – 25 August 1951) was a Barbadian cricketer. He played in one first-class match for the Barbados cricket team in 1895/96.

== See also ==
- List of Barbadian representative cricketers
