= Darnley Boxill =

Barbadian cricketer (1944–2022)

Personal information
- Full name: Darnley Da Costa Boxill
- Born: 2 October 1944; Christ Church, Barbados
- Died: 10 October 2022 (aged 78)
- Batting: Right-handed
- Role: Wicket-keeper

Domestic team information
- Years: Team
- 1964 to 1972: Barbados cricket team

Career statistics
Competition	First-class	List A
Matches	15	2
Runs scored	149	2
Batting average	8.27	2.00
100s/50s	0/0	0/0
Top score	38	2
Catches/stumpings	28/14	5/–
- Source: Cricinfo, 1 July 2021

Darnley Da Costa Boxill (2 October 1944 – 10 October 2022) was a Barbadian cricketer. As a wicket-keeper, he played in 15 first-class matches for the Barbados cricket team from 1964 to 1972.

Boxill was an accountant. In the early 1990s he invented and developed a cricket scoring system that enabled computerised ball-by-ball analysis of each player's performances.

Boxill died in October 2022, at the age of 78.

== See also ==
- List of Barbadian representative cricketers
