= Wayne Blackman =

Barbadian cricketer (born 1975)

Personal information
- Born: 25 December 1975 (age 50); Saint James, Barbados
- Source: Cricinfo, 11 November 2020

Wayne Blackman (born 25 December 1975) is a Barbadian cricketer. He played in fifteen first-class and seven List A matches for the Barbados cricket team from 1999 to 2007.

== See also ==
- List of Barbadian representative cricketers
