= Frederick Clairmonte =

Barbadian cricketer (1886–1960)

Personal information
- Born: 25 May 1886; Saint Michael, Barbados
- Died: 20 September 1960 (aged 74); Christ Church, Barbados
- Source: Cricinfo, 13 November 2020

Frederick Clairmonte (25 May 1886 – 20 September 1960) was a Barbadian cricketer. He played in one first-class match for the Barbados cricket team in 1909/10.

== See also ==
- List of Barbadian representative cricketers
