= Geoffrey Hutchinson (cricketer) =

Barbadian cricketer (1933–2021)

Personal information
- Born: 29 August 1933; Saint Michael, Barbados
- Died: 3 July 2021 (aged 87); Barbados
- Batting: Right-handed
- Bowling: Right-arm medium
- Source: Cricinfo, 13 November 2020

Geoffrey Hutchinson (29 August 1933 – 3 July 2021) was a Barbadian cricketer. He played in two first-class cricket matches for Barbados in 1955/56.

== See also ==
- List of Barbadian representative cricketers
