= John Skeete =

Barbadian cricketer (1848–1889)

Personal information
- Born: 16 June 1848; Saint Lucy, Barbados
- Died: July 1889; Supers Land, Barbados
- Source: Cricinfo, 17 November 2020

John Skeete (16 June 1848 – July 1889) was a Barbadian cricketer. He played in one first-class match for the Barbados cricket team in 1865/66.

== See also ==
- List of Barbadian representative cricketers
