= Geoffrey Mapp =

Barbadian cricketer (born 1959)

Personal information
- Born: 6 April 1959 (age 67); Saint George, Barbados
- Source: Cricinfo, 13 November 2020

Geoffrey Mapp (born 6 April 1959) is a Barbadian cricketer. He played in one List A match for the Barbados cricket team in 1984/85.

== See also ==
- List of Barbadian representative cricketers
