= Henry Trotman =

Barbadian cricketer

Personal information
- Born: 19 July 1837; Saint George, Barbados
- Source: Cricinfo, 17 November 2020

Henry Trotman (born 19 July 1837, date of death unknown) was a Barbadian cricketer. He played in one first-class match for the Barbados cricket team in 1865/66.

== See also ==
- List of Barbadian representative cricketers
