= Randy Thomas (cricketer) =

Barbadian cricketer (born 1982)

Personal information
- Full name: Randy Rommel Thomas
- Born: 15 June 1982 (age 44); Barbados
- Source: Cricinfo, 17 November 2020

Randy Thomas (born 15 June 1982) is a Barbadian cricketer. He played in one first-class match for the Barbados cricket team in 2002/03.

== See also ==
- List of Barbadian representative cricketers
