= Corey Edwards =

Barbadian cricketer (born 1983)

Personal information
- Born: 2 September 1983 (age 43); Barbados
- Source: Cricinfo, 13 November 2020

Corey Edwards (born 2 September 1983) is a Barbadian cricketer. He played in three first-class matches for the Barbados cricket team in 2010.

== See also ==
- List of Barbadian representative cricketers
