= Robert Browne (cricketer) =

Barbadian cricketer

Personal information
- Born: 3 July 1863; Christ Church, Barbados
- Source: Cricinfo, 11 November 2020

Robert Browne (born 3 July 1863, date of death unknown) was a Barbadian cricketer. He played in two first-class matches for the Barbados cricket team in 1883/84 and 1896/97.

== See also ==
- List of Barbadian representative cricketers
