= Kenneth Warren (cricketer) =

Barbadian cricketer (1926–2008)

Personal information
- Born: 23 June 1926; Saint Michael, Barbados
- Died: 16 August 2008 (aged 82)
- Source: Cricinfo, 17 November 2020

Kenneth Warren (23 June 1926 – 16 August 2008) was a Barbadian cricketer. He played in one first-class match for the Barbados cricket team in 1954/55.

== See also ==
- List of Barbadian representative cricketers
