= Frank Lobo =

Barbadian cricketer (1910–1992)

Personal information
- Born: 6 January 1910; Saint Michael, Barbados
- Died: 27 September 1992 (aged 82); Port of Spain, Trinidad
- Source: Cricinfo, 13 November 2020

Frank Lobo (6 January 1910 – 27 September 1992) was a Barbadian cricketer. He played in one first-class match for the Barbados cricket team in 1933/34.

== See also ==
- List of Barbadian representative cricketers
