= Robert Alleyne (cricketer) =

Barbadian cricketer (1847–1886)

Personal information
- Born: 25 March 1847; Saint John, Barbados
- Died: 25 July 1886 (aged 39); Iowa, United States
- Source: Cricinfo, 11 November 2020

Robert Alleyne (25 March 1847 – 25 July 1886) was a Barbadian cricketer. He played in one first-class match for the Barbados cricket team in 1871/72.

== See also ==
- List of Barbadian representative cricketers
