= George Pile =

Barbadian cricketer (1858–1948)

Personal information
- Born: 8 July 1858; Saint George, Barbados
- Died: 15 March 1948 (aged 89); Saint George, Barbados
- Source: Cricinfo, 13 November 2020

George Pile (8 July 1858 – 15 March 1948) was a Barbadian cricketer. He played in four first-class matches for the Barbados cricket team from 1883 to 1892.

== See also ==
- List of Barbadian representative cricketers
