= Corinne Camacho =

American actress (1941–2010)

- Corinne Camacho in The Rockford Files, 1974
- Born: Gloria Angelina Katharina Alletto; October 31, 1941; Passaic, New Jersey, U.S.
- Died: September 15, 2010 (aged 68); Beaverton, Oregon, U.S.
- Other name: Corinne Michaels
- Occupations: Actress; model; singer; songwriter
- Years active: 1967–1997
- Known for: Days of Our Lives; Medical Center
- Spouses: Richard Paul Camacho (m. 1961; div. 1971) Drew Michaels (m. 1974; div. 1976) Richard Paul Camacho (m. 1978, divorced)
- Children: 2

Corinne Camacho, also known as Corinne Michaels (October 31, 1941 – September 15, 2010), was an American actress, model, singer and songwriter. She is known for playing Joanne Barnes on Days of Our Lives.

== Early life ==
Born Gloria Angelina Katharina Alletto in Passaic, New Jersey, she moved with her parents to Los Angeles at age 5. Camacho took classical piano training at the Conservatory of Music and Arts in New Jersey. In the 1960s, Camacho was one of the top fashion models on the West Coast. She married, started a family, and transitioned into the world of acting. She switched to acting in 1967 and worked steadily in television, theater, and film for the next three decades.

== Career ==
Camacho made her acting debut in an episode of The Wild Wild West as the date of Artemus Gordon, played by Ross Martin. She went on to play small parts on Bewitched, I Dream of Jeannie and The Flying Nun. Later she had a recurring role on Medical Center. Other television credits included Mannix, M*A*S*H, Little House on the Prairie, The Bionic Woman, The Six Million Dollar Man, The Rockford Files and The Waltons, as well as a year-long stint on the daytime drama The Days of Our Lives. She was often credited as Corinne Michaels after she married Drew Michaels in 1974.

In 1996, Camacho moved to New Mexico to build and run a hospice center. She moved to Oregon in 2001, and became a life coach. She taught music and recorded a children's album. Camacho was an accomplished pianist and composer. In 2006, she released an album called Love Notes & Lullabies that she distributed personally.

== Death ==
Camacho died of cancer on September 15, 2010, in Beaverton, Oregon at age 68. She was survived by her son, Christopher Camacho, daughter, Gabrielle Yasenchak and two grandchildren. Her niece is singer, songwriter and music producer Zoey Tess.

== Filmography ==
=== Film ===
Year	Film	Role	Notes
1969	Marlowe	Julie	
1978	Born Again	Raquel Ramirez (as Corinne Michaels)	Biographical film
1983	Laboratory	Laurie Van Deerin, Subject 33T	Science fiction film
1993	Anchoress	Pilgrim (as Corinne Michel)	Drama film
1997	Lewis & Clark & George	NY Tourist (as Corinne Michaels)	

=== Television ===
Year	Title	Role	Episodes
1967	The Wild Wild West	Artie's Date (uncredited)	Episode: "The Night of the Tottering Tontine"
1967	Bewitched	Phoebe	Episode: "Nobody But a Frog Knows How to Live"
1967	I Dream of Jeannie	Nurse #1	Episode: "Who Are You Calling a Genie?"
1969	CBS Playhouse	Sally Porter	Episode: "The Experiment"
1970	Mayberry R.F.D.	Barbara	Episode: "Millie and the Great Outdoors"
1970	The Mask of Sheba	Dr. Joanna Glenville	Television film
1969–1970	The Flying Nun	Dolores	Episode: "The New Habit"
1969–1970	The Flying Nun	Theresa	Episode: "A Gift for El Charro"
1970	Dan August	Carlotta	Episode: "The Murder of a Small Town"
1970	Love, American Style	Doris (segment "Love and the Psychiatrist"	Episode: "Love and the Hypnotist / Love and the Psychiatrist"
1970	The F.B.I.	Andrea Phillips	Episode: "Incident in the Desert"
1971	Sarge	Marie	Episode: "Ring Out, Ring In"
1972	Gidget Gets Married	Nancy Lewis	Television film
1969-1972	Mannix	Maria Lardelli	Episode: "A Pittance of Faith"
1969-1972	Mannix	Victoria Bertelli	Episode: "The Nowhere Victim"
1969-1972	Mannix	Maria Fortune	Episode: "Cry Pigeon"
1972	The Sixth Sense	Anne Carver	Episode: "The House That Cried Murder"
1972	Owen Marshall, Counselor at Law	Paula Kerr	Episode: "Hour of Judgment"
1969–1972	Medical Center	Dr. Jeanne Bartlett	18 episodes
1972	Banyon	Lila Merrick	Episode: "Think of Me Kindly"
1972	Jigsaw	(as Corinne Camacho)	Episode: "Finder's Fee"
1973	The Rookies	Liz Sanders	Episode: "The Wheel of Death"
1973	Barnaby Jones	Bonnie Lee	Episode: "Sunday: Doomsday"
1973	The Girl with Something Extra	Kelly Handley	Episode: "All the Nudes That's Fit to Print"
1973	M*A*S*H	Lt. Regina Hopkins	Episode: "L.I.P. (Local Indigenous Personnel)"
1973	Griff	Evelyn Gray (as Corinne Camacho)	Episode: "The Last Ballad"
1973	What Are Best Friends For?	Deborah Nesbitt	Television film
1974	The Rockford Files	Janet Carr	Episode: “Exit Prentiss Carr”
1974	Planet Earth	Bronta (as Corinne Camacho)	
1974	Temperatures Rising	Dr. Leslie Kirk	Episode: "Is There a Lady Doctor in the House?"
1974	Amy Prentiss	Judyth Payson	Episode: "The Desperate World of Jane Doe"
1975	The Specialists	Ruth Conoyer	Television film
1975	Kolchak: The Night Stalker	Dr. Leslie Dwyer (as Corinne Michaels)	Episode: "Mr. R.I.N.G."
1972-1975	Cannon	Cathy Hauser	Episode: "Nobody Beats the House"
1972-1975	Cannon	Grace Jameson	Episode: "Valley of the Damned"
1972-1975	Cannon	Carole Downs (as Corinne Michaels)	Episode: "Coffin Corner"
1975	S.W.A.T.	Robin Phillips (as Corinne Michaels)	Episode: "Death Score"
1975	S.W.A.T.	Renee Lavalle (as Corinne Michaels)	Episode: "Murder by Fire"
1976	City of Angels	Velma (as Corinne Michaels)	Episode: "The Parting Shot"
1976	The Bionic Woman	Lynda Wilson (as Corinne Michaels)	Episode: "Kill Oscar"
1976	The Six Million Dollar Man	Lynda Wilson (as Corinne Michaels)	Episode: "Kill Oscar: Part 2"
1977	Aspen	Mrs. Morelli (as Corinne Michaels)	Episode: "Aspen: Chapter II"
1978	Wonder Woman	Captain Anne Colby (as Corinne Michaels)	Episode: "Flight to Oblivion"
1978	Killing Stone	Ellen Rizzi (as Corinne Michaels)	Television film
1978	Days of Our Lives	Joanne Barnes (as Corinne Michaels)	64 episodes
1979	The Runaways	Ruth	Episode: "The Breaking Point"
1977-1979	The Rockford Files	Tracy Marquette (as Corinne Michaels)	Episode: "A Deadly Maze"
1977-1979	The Rockford Files	Linda Hassler (as Corinne Michaels)	Episode: "Lions, Tigers, Monkeys and Dogs"
1977-1979	The Rockford Files	Linda Hassler (as Corinne Michaels)	Episode: "No Fault Affair"
1980	Charlie's Angels	Angela Redmont (as Corinne Michaels)	Episode: "Nips and Tucks"
1981	The Waltons	Mrs. Bassett (as Corinne Michaels)	Episode: "The Heartache"
1981	Magnum, P.I.	Elaine Selmire (as Corinne Michaels)	Episode: "The Sixth Position"
1982	Lou Grant	Prosecutor Markham (as Corinne Michaels)	Episode: "Cameras"
1977-1982	Little House on the Prairie	Eloise Taylor (as Corinne Michaels); Grace Snider Edwards	Episode: "My Ellen"; Episode: "A Promise to Keep"
1982	Trapper John, M.D.	Dr. Teneely Corinne Michaels)	Episode: "Love and Marriage"
1982	Flamingo Road	(as Corinne Michaels)	Episode: "An Eye for an Eye"
1982	Capitol	Joan Dade	4 episodes
1983	Lottery!	(as Corinne Michaels)	Episode: "Houston: Duffy's Choice"
1985	Consenting Adult	Claire (as Corinne Michaels)	Television film
1985	Airwolf	Dr. Stuart (as Corinne Michaels)	Episode: "And a Child Shall Lead"
1986	T.J. Hooker	Karen - Psychiatrist (as Corinne Michaels)	Episode: "Murder by Law"
1987	Cagney & Lacey	Dr. Eisenberg (as Corinne Michaels)	Episode: "Easy Does It"
1987	Hunter	Sister Nora (as Corinne Michaels)	Episode: "A Child Is Born"
