= Lionel Hutson =

Barbadian cricketer (1891–1941)

Personal information
- Born: 27 October 1891; Saint Michael, Barbados
- Died: 28 July 1941 (aged 49); Saint Michael, Barbados
- Source: Cricinfo, 13 November 2020

Lionel Hutson (27 October 1891 – 28 July 1941) was a Barbadian cricketer. He played in two first-class matches for the Barbados cricket team in 1922/23 and 1924/25.

== See also ==
- List of Barbadian representative cricketers
