= Hubert Brathwaite =

Barbadian cricketer (born 1950)

Personal information
- Full name: Hubert Arlington Brathwaite
- Born: 6 June 1950 (age 76); Saint John, Barbados
- Source: Cricinfo, 27 June 2023

Hubert Arlington Brathwaite (born 6 June 1950) is a Barbadian cricketer. He played in six first-class and five List A matches for the Barbados cricket team from 1978 to 1984.

== See also ==
- List of Barbadian representative cricketers
