= Ernest Hinkson =

Barbadian cricketer (1870–1936)

Personal information
- Born: 24 August 1870; Saint Michael, Barbados
- Died: 10 June 1936 (aged 65); Christ Church, Barbados
- Source: Cricinfo, 13 November 2020

Ernest Hinkson (24 August 1870 – 10 June 1936) was a Barbadian cricketer. He played in two first-class matches for the Barbados cricket team in 1887/88.

== See also ==
- List of Barbadian representative cricketers
