= Henderson Broomes =

Barbadian cricketer (born 1968)

Personal information
- Born: 24 November 1968 (age 57); Barbados
- Source: Cricinfo, 11 November 2020

Henderson Broomes (born 24 November 1968) is a Barbadian cricketer. He played in eleven List A matches for the Barbados cricket team from 1994 to 1999.

== See also ==
- List of Barbadian representative cricketers
