= Howell Barnes =

Barbadian cricketer (1887–1959)

Personal information
- Born: 3 September 1887; Saint Michael, Barbados
- Died: 31 August 1959 (aged 71); Colchester, England
- Source: Cricinfo, 11 November 2020

Howell Barnes (3 September 1887 – 31 August 1959) was a Barbadian cricketer. He played in four first-class matches for the Barbados cricket team in 1903/04 and 1904/05.

== See also ==
- List of Barbadian representative cricketers
