= Larry Babb =

Barbadian cricketer (born 1983)

Personal information
- Born: 6 May 1983 (age 43); Saint Lucy, Barbados
- Source: Cricinfo, 11 November 2020

Larry Babb (born 6 May 1983) is a Barbadian cricketer. He played in two Twenty20 matches for the Barbados cricket team in 2010.

== See also ==
- List of Barbadian representative cricketers
