= Elon Jones =

Barbadian cricketer (born 1960)

Personal information
- Born: 28 October 1960 (age 66); Saint Peter, Barbados
- Source: Cricinfo, 13 November 2020

Elon Jones (born 28 October 1960) is a Barbadian cricketer. He played in two List A matches for the Barbados cricket team in 1986/87.

== See also ==
- List of Barbadian representative cricketers
