= Leslie Harris (Barbadian cricketer) =

Barbadian cricketer (1920–2007)

Personal information
- Born: 9 October 1920; Saint Michael, Barbados
- Died: 20 May 2007 (aged 86); Bridgetown, Barbados
- Source: Cricinfo, 13 November 2020

Leslie Harris (9 October 1920 – 20 May 2007) was a Barbadian cricketer. He played in five first-class match for the Barbados cricket team from 1942 to 1945.

== See also ==
- List of Barbadian representative cricketers
