= Wesley Johnson (cricketer) =

Barbadian cricketer (1877–??)

Personal information
- Born: 2 September 1877; San Fernando, Trinidad
- Source: Cricinfo, 13 November 2020

Wesley Johnson (born 2 September 1877, date of death unknown) was a Barbadian cricketer. He played in one first-class match for the Barbados cricket team in 1896/97. His mother was part of the Mitchell family from Grenada, and his Father was from Barbados.

== See also ==
- List of Barbadian representative cricketers
