= Carlo Morris =

Barbadian cricketer (born 1980)

Personal information
- Born: 13 January 1980 (age 46); Barbados
- Source: Cricinfo, 13 November 2020

Carlo Morris (born 13 January 1980) is a Barbadian cricketer. He played in six first-class, ten List A, and thirteen Twenty20 matches for the Barbados cricket team from 2006 to 2012.

== See also ==
- List of Barbadian representative cricketers
