= Khalid Springer =

Barbadian cricketer (born 1982)

Personal information
- Born: 3 July 1982 (age 44); Barbados
- Source: Cricinfo, 17 November 2020

Khalid Springer (born 3 July 1982) is a Barbadian cricketer. He played in two List A and three Twenty20 matches for the Barbados cricket team in 2008 and 2009.

== See also ==
- List of Barbadian representative cricketers
