= Kenneth Mason (cricketer) =

Barbadian cricketer (1881–1974)

Personal information
- Born: 18 September 1881; Saint George, Barbados
- Died: November 1974; Saint Michael, Barbados
- Source: Cricinfo, 13 November 2020

Kenneth Mason (18 September 1881 – November 1974) was a Barbadian cricketer. He played in seventeen first-class matches for the Barbados cricket team from 1903 to 1926.

== See also ==
- List of Barbadian representative cricketers
