= Walter Outram =

Barbadian cricketer

Personal information
- Born: 1 June 1855; Saint Philip, Barbados
- Source: Cricinfo, 13 November 2020

Walter Outram (born 1 June 1855, date of death unknown) was a Barbadian cricketer. He played in one first-class match for the Barbados cricket team in 1871/72.

== See also ==
- List of Barbadian representative cricketers
