= Ernest Collymore =

Barbadian cricketer (1893–1962)

Personal information
- Born: 4 February 1893; Saint Michael, Barbados
- Died: 23 June 1962 (aged 69); Saint Michael, Barbados
- Source: Cricinfo, 13 November 2020

Ernest Collymore (4 February 1893 – 23 June 1962) was a Barbadian cricketer. He played in one first-class match for the Barbados cricket team in 1922/23.

== See also ==
- List of Barbadian representative cricketers
