= Hattian Graham =

Barbadian cricketer (born 1973)

Personal information
- Born: 22 June 1973 (age 53); Saint George, Barbados
- Source: Cricinfo, 13 November 2020

Hattian Graham (born 22 June 1973) is a Barbadian cricketer. He played in one List A and four first-class matches for the Barbados cricket team from 1997 to 2000. Hattian played as an overseas player for Westcliff on Sea Cricket Club in Top Essex League in 1993 and 1994 and was very successful.

== See also ==
- List of Barbadian representative cricketers
