= Rupert Wood =

Barbadian cricketer (1917–1968)

Personal information
- Born: 12 November 1917; Saint Philip, Barbados
- Died: 5 January 1968 (aged 50); Montreal, Quebec, Canada
- Source: Cricinfo, 17 November 2020

Rupert Wood (12 November 1917 – 5 January 1968) was a Barbadian cricketer. He played in five first-class matches for the Barbados cricket team from 1933 to 1939.

== See also ==
- List of Barbadian representative cricketers
