= Walter Fields =

Barbadian cricketer (1879–1942)

Personal information
- Born: 16 March 1879; Saint Michael, Barbados
- Died: 7 February 1942 (aged 62); Saint Michael, Barbados
- Source: Cricinfo, 13 November 2020

Walter Fields (16 March 1879 – 7 February 1942) was a Barbadian cricketer. He played in three first-class matches for the Barbados cricket team from 1907 to 1913.

== See also ==
- List of Barbadian representative cricketers
