= Eric Skelton =

Barbadian cricketer (1881–1942)

Personal information
- Born: 13 April 1881; Prestwich, England
- Died: 11 June 1942 (aged 61); Chelsea, England
- Source: Cricinfo, 17 November 2020

Eric George Skelton (13 April 1881 – 11 June 1942) was a British army officer and cricketer in Barbados. He played in one first-class match for the Barbados cricket team in 1901/02.

Skelton was commissioned a second lieutenant in the West India Regiment on 11 August 1900, and promoted lieutenant on 13 February 1901. He was with the Indian Staff Corps, but rejoined his regiment in December 1902.

== See also ==
- List of Barbadian representative cricketers
