= Barry Callender =

Barbadian cricketer (born 1967)

Personal information
- Born: 24 April 1967 (age 59); Barbados
- Source: Cricinfo, 13 November 2020

Barry Callender (born 24 April 1967) is a Barbadian cricketer. He played in one List A match for the Barbados cricket team in 1994/95.

== See also ==
- List of Barbadian representative cricketers
