= Frederick Smith (Barbadian cricketer) =

Barbadian cricketer (1837–1923)

Personal information
- Born: 31 March 1837; Saint Michael, Barbados
- Died: 27 March 1923 (aged 85); Saint Michael, Barbados
- Source: Cricinfo, 17 November 2020

Frederick Smith (31 March 1837 – 27 March 1923) was a Barbadian cricketer. He played in three first-class matches for the Barbados cricket team from 1864 to 1872. He was also the first player to captain Barbados in a match.

== See also ==
- List of Barbadian representative cricketers
