= Walter Foster (cricketer) =

Barbadian cricketer

Personal information
- Born: 24 May 1915; Saint Michael, Barbados
- Source: Cricinfo, 13 November 2020

Walter Foster (born 24 May 1915, date of death unknown) was a Barbadian cricketer. He played in one first-class match for the Barbados cricket team in 1941/42.

== See also ==
- List of Barbadian representative cricketers
