= Henry Fitzherbert Austin =

Barbadian cricketer (1874–1957)

Personal information
- Born: 1 September 1874; Saint George, Barbados
- Died: 18 January 1957 (aged 82); Christ Church, Barbados
- Source: Cricinfo, 11 November 2020

Henry Fitzherbert Austin (1 September 1874 – 18 January 1957) was a Barbadian cricketer. He played in eight first-class matches for the Barbados cricket team from 1897 to 1904.

== See also ==
- List of Barbadian representative cricketers
