= Julian Cumberbatch =

Barbadian cricketer (1877–1944)

Personal information
- Born: 10 May 1877; Saint Michael, Barbados
- Died: 16 March 1944 (aged 66); Saint Michael, Barbados
- Source: Cricinfo, 13 November 2020

Julian Cumberbatch (10 May 1877 – 16 March 1944) was a Barbadian cricketer. He played in one first-class match for the Barbados cricket team in 1907/08.

== See also ==
- List of Barbadian representative cricketers
