= Owen Pilgrim =

Barbadian cricketer (1893–1972)

Personal information
- Born: 1 October 1893; Saint John, Barbados
- Died: 13 January 1972 (aged 78); Bridgetown, Barbados
- Source: Cricinfo, 13 November 2020

Owen Pilgrim (1 October 1893 – 13 January 1972) was a Barbadian cricketer. He played in four first-class matches for the Barbados cricket team from 1919 to 1926.

== See also ==
- List of Barbadian representative cricketers
