= Vicary Challenor =

Barbadian cricketer (1883–1973)

Personal information
- Born: 15 May 1883; Saint Michael, Barbados
- Died: 25 March 1973 (aged 89); Vegreville, Alberta, Canada
- Source: Cricinfo, 13 November 2020

Vicary Challenor (15 May 1883 – 25 March 1973) was a Barbadian cricketer. He played in ten first-class matches for the Barbados cricket team from 1900 to 1904.

== See also ==
- List of Barbadian representative cricketers
