= William Alleyne =

Barbadian cricketer (1860–1910)

Personal information
- Born: 25 December 1860; Saint Lucy, Barbados
- Died: 5 September 1910 (aged 49); Saint Andrew, Barbados
- Source: Cricinfo, 11 November 2020

William Alleyne (25 December 1860 – 5 September 1910) was a Barbadian cricketer. He played in seven first-class matches for the Barbados cricket team from 1891 to 1895.

== See also ==
- List of Barbadian representative cricketers
