= Emmerson Jordan =

Barbadian cricketer (born 1959)

Personal information
- Born: 27 April 1959 (age 67); Saint Peter, Barbados
- Source: Cricinfo, 13 November 2020

Emmerson Jordan (born 27 April 1959) is a Barbadian cricketer. He played in four first-class matches for the Barbados cricket team in 1988/89.

== See also ==
- List of Barbadian representative cricketers
