= Arnott Harris =

Barbadian cricketer

Personal information
- Born: 10 December 1909; Saint Joseph, Barbados
- Source: Cricinfo, 13 November 2020

Arnott Harris (born 10 December 1909, date of death unknown) was a Barbadian cricketer. He played in one first-class match for the Barbados cricket team in 1934/35.

== See also ==
- List of Barbadian representative cricketers
