= Henry Adrian Austin =

Barbadian cricketer (born 1972)

Personal information
- Born: 31 October 1972 (age 54); Barbados
- Source: Cricinfo, 11 November 2020

Henry Adrian Austin (born 31 October 1972) is a Barbadian cricketer. He played in one first-class match for the Barbados cricket team in 1996/97.

== See also ==
- List of Barbadian representative cricketers
