= Henry Haynes (cricketer) =

Barbadian cricketer (1834–1892)

Personal information
- Born: 20 September 1834; Saint John, Barbados
- Died: February 1892; Bridgetown, Barbados
- Source: Cricinfo, 13 November 2020

Henry Haynes (20 September 1834 – February 1892) was a Barbadian cricketer. He played in one first-class match for the Barbados cricket team in 1864/65.

== See also ==
- List of Barbadian representative cricketers
