= Mitchell Clarke =

Barbadian cricketer (1901–1988)

Personal information
- Born: 5 January 1901; Saint Michael, Barbados
- Died: 9 July 1988 (aged 87); Saint Michael, Barbados
- Source: Cricinfo, 13 November 2020

Mitchell Clarke (5 January 1901 – 9 July 1988) was a Barbadian cricketer. He played in one first-class match for the Barbados cricket team in 1928–29.

== See also ==
- List of Barbadian representative cricketers
