= Earnest King =

Barbadian cricketer

Personal information
- Born: 21 May 1846; Saint Michael, Barbados
- Source: Cricinfo, 13 November 2020

Earnest King (born 21 May 1846, date of death unknown) was a Barbadian cricketer. He played in two first-class matches for the Barbados cricket team in 1864/65 and 1865/66.

== See also ==
- List of Barbadian representative cricketers
