= Livingstone Puckerin =

Barbadian cricketer (1969–2018)

Personal information
- Born: 19 June 1969; Saint John, Barbados
- Died: 18 September 2018 (aged 49)
- Source: Cricinfo, 13 November 2020

Livingstone Puckerin (19 June 1969 – 18 September 2018) was a Barbadian cricketer. He played in eighteen first-class and fourteen List A matches for the Barbados cricket team from 1988 to 1996, and became the manager of the team in 2008. He died in September 2018 at the age of 49, after being diagnosed with cancer.

== See also ==
- List of Barbadian representative cricketers
