= William Clarke (Barbadian cricketer) =

Barbadian cricketer (1841–1907)

Personal information
- Born: May 1841; Bridgetown, Barbados
- Died: 17 July 1907; Saint Michael, Barbados
- Source: Cricinfo, 13 November 2020

William Clarke (May 1841 – 17 July 1907) was a Barbadian cricketer. He played in four first-class matches for the Barbados cricket team from 1864 to 1888.

== See also ==
- List of Barbadian representative cricketers
