= Joseph Newton (cricketer) =

Barbadian cricketer (born 1950)

Personal information
- Born: 23 January 1950 (age 76); Christ Church, Barbados
- Source: Cricinfo, 13 November 2020

Joseph Newton (born 23 January 1950) is a Barbadian cricketer. He played in two first-class and three List A matches for the Barbados cricket team in 1975/76 and 1976/77.

== See also ==
- List of Barbadian representative cricketers
