= Othneil Downes =

Barbadian cricketer (1934–2000)

Personal information
- Born: 1 September 1934; Saint Michael, Barbados
- Died: 25 April 2000 (aged 65); Bridgetown, Barbados
- Source: Cricinfo, 13 November 2020

Othneil Downes (1 September 1934 – 25 April 2000) was a Barbadian cricketer. He played in four first-class matches for the Barbados cricket team in 1958/59.

== See also ==
- List of Barbadian representative cricketers
