= Sherlon Greaves =

Barbadian cricketer (born 1962)

Personal information
- Born: 26 April 1962 (age 64); Saint Andrew, Barbados
- Source: Cricinfo, 13 November 2020

Sherlon Greaves (born 26 April 1962) is a Barbadian cricketer. He played in ten first-class and three List A matches for the Barbados cricket team from 1983 to 1994.

== See also ==
- List of Barbadian representative cricketers
