= Noel Broomes =

Barbadian cricketer (born 1956)

Personal information
- Born: 23 December 1956 (age 69); Saint James, Barbados
- Source: Cricinfo, 11 November 2020

Noel Broomes (born 23 December 1956) is a Barbadian cricketer. He played in eight first-class and six List A matches for the Barbados cricket team from 1982 to 1987.

== See also ==
- List of Barbadian representative cricketers
