= Thomas Peirce =

Barbadian cricketer (1916–1988)

Personal information
- Born: 26 December 1916; Christ Church, Barbados
- Died: 15 December 1988 (aged 71); Saint Philip, Barbados
- Source: Cricinfo, 13 November 2020

Thomas Peirce (26 December 1916 – 15 November 1988) was a Barbadian cricketer. He played in sixteen first-class matches for the Barbados cricket team from 1941 to 1949.

== See also ==
- List of Barbadian representative cricketers
