= Horace King (Barbadian cricketer) =

Barbadian cricketer (1928–2016)

Personal information
- Full name: Horace Arlington King
- Born: 19 December 1928; Saint Michael, Barbados
- Died: 15 November 2016 (aged 87)
- Batting: Left-handed
- Bowling: Slow left-arm orthodox
- Relatives: Tony King (brother)
- Source: Cricinfo, 13 November 2020

Horace King (19 December 1928 – 15 November 2016) was a Barbadian cricketer. He played in three first-class matches for the Barbados cricket team from 1948 to 1953.

King attended Harrison College in Barbados. A left-arm spinner, he retired from cricket at the age of 24 to study surveying in England. He became Chief Surveyor of Barbados. His younger brother Tony also played for Barbados.

== See also ==
- List of Barbadian representative cricketers
