= Courtenay Selman =

Barbadian cricketer (born 1945)

Personal information
- Born: 13 June 1945 (age 81); Saint George, Barbados
- Source: Cricinfo, 17 November 2020

Courtenay Selman (born 13 June 1945) is a Barbadian cricketer. He played in three first-class matches for the Barbados cricket team from 1970 to 1974.

== See also ==
- List of Barbadian representative cricketers
