= Rondelle Yearwood =

Barbadian cricketer (born 1975)

Personal information
- Born: 21 July 1975 (age 51); Barbados
- Source: Cricinfo, 17 November 2020

Rondelle Yearwood (born 21 July 1975) is a Barbadian cricketer. He played in one first-class match for the Barbados cricket team in 1999/00.

== See also ==
- List of Barbadian representative cricketers
