= John Trotman =

Barbadian cricketer

Personal information
- Born: 14 April 1834; Saint George, Barbados
- Source: Cricinfo, 17 November 2020

John Trotman (born 14 April 1834, date of death unknown) was a Barbadian cricketer. He played in one first-class match for the Barbados cricket team in 1864/65.

== See also ==
- List of Barbadian representative cricketers
