= Hillard Doyle =

Barbadian cricketer (born 1935)

Personal information
- Born: 15 November 1935 (age 90); Saint Michael, Barbados
- Source: Cricinfo, 13 November 2020

Hillard Doyle (born 15 November 1935) is a Barbadian cricketer. He played in one first-class match for the Barbados cricket team in 1961/62.

== See also ==
- List of Barbadian representative cricketers
