= Herbert Thorne =

Barbadian cricketer (1865–1956)

Personal information
- Born: 1 August 1865; Saint John, Barbados
- Died: 12 December 1956 (aged 91); Saint John, Barbados
- Source: Cricinfo, 17 November 2020

Herbert Thorne (1 August 1865 – 12 December 1956) was a Barbadian cricketer. He played in three first-class matches for the Barbados cricket team in 1891/92.

== See also ==
- List of Barbadian representative cricketers
