= Antonio Thomas (cricketer) =

Barbadian cricketer (born 1982)

Personal information
- Born: 21 October 1982 (age 44); Saint James, Barbados
- Source: Cricinfo, 17 November 2020

Antonio Thomas (born 21 October 1982) is a Barbadian cricketer. He played in eight first-class matches for the Barbados cricket team from 2001 to 2005.

== See also ==
- List of Barbadian representative cricketers
