= Edmund Greene =

Barbadian cricketer (1921–1997)

Personal information
- Born: 20 April 1921; Saint George, Barbados
- Died: 20 May 1997 (aged 76); Saint George, Barbados
- Source: Cricinfo, 13 November 2020

Edmund Greene (20 April 1921 – 20 May 1997) was a Barbadian cricketer. He played in eight first-class matches for the Barbados cricket team from 1943 to 1946.

== See also ==
- List of Barbadian representative cricketers
