= Oscar Robinson =

Barbadian cricketer (1916–??)

Personal information
- Born: 2 July 1916; Saint Philip, Barbados
- Source: Cricinfo, 13 November 2020

Oscar Robinson (born 2 July 1916, date of death unknown) was a Barbadian cricketer. He played in five first-class match for the Barbados cricket team from 1943 to 1947.

== See also ==
- List of Barbadian representative cricketers
