= Dayne Maynard =

Barbadian cricketer (born 1969)

Personal information
- Born: 1 April 1969 (age 57); Barbados
- Source: Cricinfo, 13 November 2020

Dayne Maynard (born 1 April 1969) is a Barbadian cricketer. He played in sixteen first-class and ten List A matches for the Barbados cricket team from 1993 to 2001.

== See also ==
- List of Barbadian representative cricketers
