= J. B. Emtage =

Barbadian cricketer (1902–1995)

James Emtage
Personal information
- Born: 14 February 1902; Saint John, Barbados
- Died: 12 August 1995 (aged 93); Essex, England
- Source: Cricinfo, 13 November 2020

James Bernard De Courcey Emtage (14 February 1902 – 12 August 1995) was a Barbadian writer, who published as J. B. Emtage. He was also a cricketer, who played in one first-class match for the Barbados cricket team in 1921/22.

== Life ==
Emtage was educated at The Lodge School in Barbados, and Magdalen College, Oxford. He married Laurence May Briggs Clarke.

== Works ==
- Ski Fever. London: Methuen & Co, 1936. With pictures by Lewis Baumer.
- Brown Sugar: a vestigial tale. London: Collins, 1966.
- Foolscap and Bells. Bognor Regis: New Horizon, 1982.
- Miss Cheevus: Polemical Novel. Moving Finger Books, 1993.

== See also ==
- List of Barbadian representative cricketers
