= Arnold Gilkes =

Barbadian cricketer (born 1958)

Personal information
- Born: 26 February 1958 (age 68); Saint Thomas, Barbados
- Source: Cricinfo, 13 November 2020

Arnold Gilkes (born 26 February 1958) is a Barbadian cricketer. He played in eleven first-class and five List A matches for the Barbados cricket team from 1975 to 1988.

== See also ==
- List of Barbadian representative cricketers
