= John Pilgrim (cricketer) =

Barbadian cricketer (1860–1925)

Personal information
- Born: 24 September 1860; Saint John, Barbados
- Died: 11 March 1925 (aged 64); Saint James, Barbados
- Source: Cricinfo, 13 November 2020

John Pilgrim (24 September 1860 – 11 March 1925) was a Barbadian cricketer. He played in three first-class matches for the Barbados cricket team in 1891/92.

== See also ==
- List of Barbadian representative cricketers
