= Odwin Gilkes =

Barbadian cricketer (born 1960)

Personal information
- Born: 26 January 1960 (age 66); Welch Town, Barbados
- Source: Cricinfo, 13 November 2020

Odwin Gilkes (born 26 January 1960) is a Barbadian cricketer. He played in one List A match for the Barbados cricket team in 1984/85.

== See also ==
- List of Barbadian representative cricketers
