= Ormond Graham =

Barbadian cricketer (1918–1989)

Personal information
- Born: 31 May 1918; Saint Michael, Barbados
- Died: 18 January 1989 (aged 70); Bridgetown, Barbados
- Source: Cricinfo, 13 November 2020

Ormond Graham (31 May 1918 – 18 January 1989) was a Barbadian cricketer. He played in two first-class matches for the Barbados cricket team in 1942/43.

== See also ==
- List of Barbadian representative cricketers
