= Walter Collymore =

Barbadian cricketer (1856–1907)

Personal information
- Born: 30 August 1856; Saint Michael, Barbados
- Died: 23 July 1907 (aged 50); Bridgetown, Barbados
- Source: Cricinfo, 13 November 2020

Walter Collymore (30 August 1856 – 23 July 1907) was a Barbadian cricketer. He played in one first-class match for the Barbados cricket team in 1883/84.

== See also ==
- List of Barbadian representative cricketers
