= Herbert Greaves =

Barbadian cricketer (1898–1953)

Personal information
- Born: 13 October 1898; Edmonton, England
- Died: 17 November 1953 (aged 55); Christ Church, Barbados
- Source: Cricinfo, 13 November 2020

Herbert Greaves (13 October 1898 – 17 November 1953) was a Barbadian cricketer. He played in eight first-class matches for the Barbados cricket team from 1923 to 1930.

== See also ==
- List of Barbadian representative cricketers
