= Will Gibbs =

Barbadian cricketer (1885–1949)

Personal information
- Born: 19 September 1885; Bridgetown, Barbados
- Died: 29 January 1949 (aged 63); Saint Michael, Barbados
- Source: Cricinfo, 13 November 2020

Will Gibbs (19 September 1885 – 29 January 1949) was a Barbadian cricketer. He played in eighteen first-class matches for the Barbados cricket team from 1907 to 1927.

== See also ==
- List of Barbadian representative cricketers
