= Neville Mason =

Barbadian cricketer (born 1956)

Personal information
- Born: 6 October 1956 (age 70); Saint Philip, Barbados
- Source: Cricinfo, 13 November 2020

Neville Mason (born 6 October 1956) is a Barbadian cricketer. He played in one List A match for the Barbados cricket team in 1984/85.

== See also ==
- List of Barbadian representative cricketers
