= Allison Johnson =

Barbadian cricketer (born 1963)

Personal information
- Born: 22 July 1963 (age 63); Saint Lucy, Barbados
- Source: Cricinfo, 13 November 2020

Allison Johnson (born 22 July 1963) is a Barbadian cricketer. He played in two first-class and three List A matches for the Barbados cricket team in 1988/89 and 1989/90.

== See also ==
- List of Barbadian representative cricketers
