= Henderson Simmons =

Barbadian cricketer (born 1941)

Personal information
- Born: 14 December 1941 (age 84); Saint Michael, Barbados
- Source: Cricinfo, 17 November 2020

Henderson Simmons (born 14 December 1941) is a Barbadian cricketer. He played in one first-class match for the Barbados cricket team in 1970/71.

== See also ==
- List of Barbadian representative cricketers
