= Derrick Bishop =

Barbadian cricketer (born 1983)

Personal information
- Born: 17 December 1983 (age 42); Saint Philip, Barbados
- Source: Cricinfo, 11 November 2020

Derrick Bishop (born 17 December 1983) is a Barbadian cricketer. He played in three List A matches for the University of the West Indies cricket team, and two Twenty20 matches for the Barbados cricket team in 2007/08.

== See also ==
- List of Barbadian representative cricketers
