= Torrance Skeete =

Barbadian cricketer (1852–1945)

Personal information
- Born: 17 May 1852; Saint Philip, Barbados
- Died: 5 July 1945 (aged 93); Christ Church, Barbados
- Source: Cricinfo, 17 November 2020

Torrance Skeete (17 May 1852 – 5 July 1945) was a Barbadian cricketer. He played in four first-class matches for the Barbados cricket team from 1871 to 1888.

== See also ==
- List of Barbadian representative cricketers
