= Dwayne Yearwood =

Barbadian cricketer (born 1980)

Personal information
- Born: 15 August 1980 (age 46); Barbados
- Source: Cricinfo, 17 November 2020

Dwayne Yearwood (born 15 August 1980) is a Barbadian cricketer. He played in one List A match for the Barbados cricket team in 2008.

== See also ==
- List of Barbadian representative cricketers
