= Ricardo Skeete =

Barbadian cricketer (born 1952)

Personal information
- Born: 14 September 1952 (age 74); Saint James, Barbados
- Source: Cricinfo, 17 November 2020

Ricardo Skeete (born 14 September 1952) is a Barbadian cricketer. He played in 25 first-class and 14 List A matches for the Barbados cricket team from 1975 to 1985.

== See also ==
- List of Barbadian representative cricketers
