= Stanton Gittens =

Barbadian cricketer (1911–1994)

Personal information
- Born: 4 May 1911; Saint Michael, Barbados
- Died: 20 April 1994 (aged 82); Barbados
- Source: Cricinfo, 13 November 2020

Stanton Gittens (4 May 1911 – 20 April 1994) was a Barbadian cricketer. He played in eleven first-class matches for the Barbados cricket team from 1934 to 1945.

== See also ==
- List of Barbadian representative cricketers
