= Nigel Johnson (cricketer) =

Barbadian cricketer (born 1952)

Personal information
- Born: 10 September 1952 (age 74); Saint George, Barbados
- Source: Cricinfo, 13 November 2020

Nigel Johnson (born 10 September 1952) is a Barbadian cricketer. He played in twelve first-class and three List A matches for the Barbados cricket team from 1978 to 1985.

== See also ==
- List of Barbadian representative cricketers
