= Barton Outram =

Barbadian cricketer (1886–1974)

Personal information
- Born: 15 July 1886; Saint John, Barbados
- Died: 5 April 1974 (aged 87); Bridgetown, Barbados
- Source: Cricinfo, 13 November 2020

Barton Outram (15 July 1886 – 5 April 1974) was a Barbadian cricketer. He played in two first-class matches for the Barbados cricket team in 1903/04.

== See also ==
- List of Barbadian representative cricketers
