= Elbert Proverbs =

Barbadian cricketer (born 1957)

Personal information
- Born: 1 July 1957 (age 69); Saint Philip, Barbados
- Source: Cricinfo, 13 November 2020

Elbert Proverbs (born 1 July 1957) is a Barbadian cricketer. He played in one first-class and one List A match for the Barbados cricket team in 1982/83 and 1984/85.

== See also ==
- List of Barbadian representative cricketers
