= Irwin Burke =

Barbadian cricketer

Personal information
- Born: 23 July 1916; Saint Michael, Barbados
- Source: Cricinfo, 11 November 2020

Irwin Burke (born 23 July 1916, date of death unknown) was a Barbadian cricketer. He played in one first-class match for the Barbados cricket team in 1938/39.

== See also ==
- List of Barbadian representative cricketers
