= Hampden Cox =

Barbadian cricketer (1866–1940)

Personal information
- Born: 3 April 1866; Saint Andrew, Barbados
- Died: 1940 (aged 73–74); Naparima, Trinidad
- Source: Cricinfo, 13 November 2020

Hampden Cox (3 April 1866 – 1940) was a Barbadian cricketer. He played in two first-class matches for the Barbados cricket team in 1887/88.

== See also ==
- List of Barbadian representative cricketers
