= Shirley Gill =

Barbadian cricketer

Personal information
- Born: 19 November 1918; Saint Michael, Barbados
- Source: Cricinfo, 13 November 2020

Shirley Gill (born 19 November 1918, date of death unknown) was a Barbadian cricketer. He played in one first-class match for the Barbados cricket team in 1940/41.

== See also ==
- List of Barbadian representative cricketers
