= Michael Maynard (cricketer) =

Barbadian cricketer (born 1976)

Personal information
- Born: 18 March 1976 (age 50); Saint Philip, Barbados
- Source: Cricinfo, 13 November 2020

Michael Maynard (born 18 March 1976) is a Barbadian cricketer. He played in one List A match for the Barbados cricket team in 1999/00.

== See also ==
- List of Barbadian representative cricketers
