= Clarence Skinner (cricketer) =

Barbadian cricketer (1900–1969)

Personal information
- Born: 13 October 1900; Saint Peter, Barbados
- Died: 2 February 1969 (aged 68); Saint Michael, Barbados
- Source: Cricinfo, 17 November 2020

Clarence Skinner (13 October 1900 – 2 February 1969) was a Barbadian cricketer. He played in one first-class match for the Barbados cricket team in 1935/36.

== See also ==
- List of Barbadian representative cricketers
