= Harold Jordan =

Barbadian cricketer (1915–2001)

Personal information
- Born: 10 July 1915; Saint Michael, Barbados
- Died: 24 August 2001 (aged 86); Saint Michael, Barbados
- Source: Cricinfo, 13 November 2020

Harold Jordan (10 July 1915 – 24 August 2001) was a Barbadian cricketer. He played in one first-class match for the Barbados cricket team in 1936/37.

== See also ==
- List of Barbadian representative cricketers
