= William Howell (Barbadian cricketer) =

Barbadian cricketer (1866–1958)

Personal information
- Born: 9 August 1866; Saint Michael, Barbados
- Died: 11 November 1958 (aged 92); St John's, Antigua
- Source: Cricinfo, 13 November 2020

William Howell (9 August 1866 – 11 November 1958) was a Barbadian cricketer. He played in five first-class matches for the Barbados cricket team from 1883 to 1895.

== See also ==
- List of Barbadian representative cricketers
