= Gerry Harding =

Barbadian cricketer (born 1943)

Personal information
- Born: 1 November 1943 (age 83); Christ Church, Barbados
- Source: Cricinfo, 13 November 2020

Gerry Harding (born 1 November 1943) is a Barbadian cricketer. He played in two first-class matches for the Barbados cricket team in 1974/75.

== See also ==
- List of Barbadian representative cricketers
