= Sean Armstrong (cricketer) =

Barbadian cricketer (born 1973)

Personal information
- Born: 11 May 1973 (age 53); Saint Philip, Barbados
- Source: Cricinfo, 11 November 2020

Sean Armstrong (born 11 May 1973) is a Barbadian cricketer. He played in fourteen first-class matches for the Barbados cricket team from 1995 to 2002.

== See also ==
- List of Barbadian representative cricketers
