= Thomas Clarke (cricketer) =

Barbadian cricketer (1839–1892)

Personal information
- Born: 17 October 1839; Christ Church, Barbados
- Died: 8 August 1892 (aged 52); Brockenhurst, England
- Source: Cricinfo, 13 November 2020

Thomas Clarke (17 October 1839 – 8 August 1892) was a Barbadian cricketer. He played in one first-class match for the Barbados cricket team in 1871/72.

== See also ==
- List of Barbadian representative cricketers
