= Benjamin Gilkes =

Barbadian cricketer (1893–1967)

Personal information
- Born: 16 March 1893; Barbados
- Died: December 1967; Saint Michael, Barbados
- Source: Cricinfo, 13 November 2020

Benjamin Gilkes (16 March 1893 – December 1967) was a Barbadian cricketer. He played in four first-class matches for the Barbados cricket team from 1919 to 1930.

== See also ==
- List of Barbadian representative cricketers
