= Stanton Proverbs =

Barbadian cricketer (born 1968)

Personal information
- Born: 6 March 1968 (age 58); Bridgetown, Barbados
- Source: Cricinfo, 13 November 2020

Stanton Proverbs (born 6 March 1968) is a Barbadian cricketer. He played in ten first-class and seven List A matches for the Barbados cricket team from 1989 to 2003.

== See also ==
- List of Barbadian representative cricketers
