= Theodore Clarke =

Barbadian cricketer

Personal information
- Born: 29 April 1860; Saint Michael, Barbados
- Died: New Jersey, United States
- Source: Cricinfo, 13 November 2020

Theodore Clarke (born 29 April 1860, date of death unknown) was a Barbadian cricketer. He played in three first-class matches for the Barbados cricket team from 1883 to 1888.

== See also ==
- List of Barbadian representative cricketers
