= Frank Thomas (Barbadian cricketer) =

Barbadian cricketer (1924–2010)

Personal information
- Born: 6 March 1924; Saint Michael, Barbados
- Died: 20 November 2010 (aged 86); Kingstown, St Vincent
- Source: Cricinfo, 17 November 2020

Frank Thomas (6 March 1924 – 20 November 2010) was a Barbadian cricketer. He played in one first-class match for the Barbados cricket team in 1944/45.

== See also ==
- List of Barbadian representative cricketers
