= Ahmed Proverbs =

Barbadian cricketer (born 1970)

Personal information
- Born: 28 January 1970 (age 56); Barbados
- Source: Cricinfo, 13 November 2020

Ahmed Proverbs (born 28 January 1970) is a Barbadian cricketer. He played in five first-class and six List A matches for the Barbados cricket team from 1990 to 1997, and a single Twenty20 match in 2008.

== See also ==
- List of Barbadian representative cricketers
