= John Byer =

Barbadian cricketer (1903–1988)

Personal information
- Born: 20 September 1903; Saint George, Barbados
- Died: 11 August 1988 (aged 84); Saint James, Barbados
- Source: Cricinfo, 11 November 2020

John Byer (20 September 1903 – 11 August 1988) was a Barbadian cricketer. He played in six first-class matches for the Barbados cricket team from 1929 to 1936.

== See also ==
- List of Barbadian representative cricketers
