= Malcolm Greenidge =

Barbadian cricketer (1860–1926)

Personal information
- Born: 25 August 1860; Saint George, Barbados
- Died: 8 September 1926 (aged 66); Saint John, Barbados
- Source: Cricinfo, 13 November 2020

Malcolm Greenidge (25 August 1860 – 8 September 1926) was a Barbadian cricketer. He played in one first-class match for the Barbados cricket team in 1895/96.

== See also ==
- List of Barbadian representative cricketers
