= Rudolph Bradshaw =

Barbadian cricketer (born 1939)

Personal information
- Born: 26 June 1939 (age 87); Christ Church, Barbados
- Source: Cricinfo, 11 November 2020

Rudolph Bradshaw (born 26 June 1939) is a Barbadian cricketer. He played in one first-class match for the Barbados cricket team in 1964/65.

== See also ==
- List of Barbadian representative cricketers
