= James Parris =

Barbadian cricketer (1905–1997)

Personal information
- Born: 15 December 1905; Saint Michael, Barbados
- Died: 29 May 1997 (aged 91); Barbados
- Source: Cricinfo, 13 November 2020

James Parris (15 December 1905 – 29 May 1997) was a Barbadian cricketer. He played in fifteen first-class matches for the Barbados cricket team from 1925 and 1947.

== See also ==
- List of Barbadian representative cricketers
