= Joseph Moore (cricketer) =

Barbadian cricketer

Personal information
- Born: 15 November 1880; Saint George, Barbados
- Source: Cricinfo, 13 November 2020

Joseph Moore (born 15 November 1880, date of death unknown) was a Barbadian cricketer. He played in five first-class matches for the Barbados cricket team from 1904 to 1910.

== See also ==
- List of Barbadian representative cricketers
