= Kenneth Goddard =

Barbadian cricketer (1918–1978)

Personal information
- Born: 1918; Barbados
- Died: 18 December 1978 (aged 59–60); Saint Michael, Barbados
- Source: Cricinfo, 13 November 2020

Kenneth Goddard (1918 – 18 December 1978) was a Barbadian cricketer. He played in one first-class match for the Barbados cricket team in 1948/49.

== See also ==
- List of Barbadian representative cricketers
