= Allan Cox (cricketer) =

Barbadian cricketer (1873–1896)

Personal information
- Born: 11 November 1873; Saint Joseph, Barbados
- Died: 5 January 1896 (aged 22); Saint Joseph, Barbados
- Source: Cricinfo, 13 November 2020

Allan Cox (11 November 1873 – 5 January 1896) was a Barbadian cricketer. He played in one first-class match for the Barbados cricket team in 1895/96.

== See also ==
- List of Barbadian representative cricketers
