= Herbert Rogers (Barbadian cricketer) =

Barbadian cricketer (1906–1976)

Personal information
- Born: 17 April 1906; Saint Michael, Barbados
- Died: 19 January 1976 (aged 69); Bridgetown, Barbados
- Source: Cricinfo, 13 November 2020

Herbert Rogers (17 April 1906 – 19 January 1976) was a Barbadian cricketer. He played in three first-class matches for the Barbados cricket team from 1926 to 1929.

== See also ==
- List of Barbadian representative cricketers
