= John Lucas (cricketer) =

West Indian and Canadian cricketer

Personal information
- Full name: John Herman Lucas
- Born: 12 June 1922; Weymouth, Saint Michael, Barbados
- Died: 18 May 2008 (aged 85); Vancouver, British Columbia, Canada
- Batting: Left-handed
- Bowling: Right-arm off break
- Relatives: Noel Lucas (brother)

Domestic team information
- Years: Team
- 1951: Canada
- 1945/46–1949/50: Barbados

Career statistics
Competition	First-class
Matches	15
Runs scored	1,074
Batting average	53.70
100s/50s	2/6
Top score	216*
Balls bowled	851
Wickets	15
Bowling average	32.26
5 wickets in innings	–
10 wickets in match	–
Best bowling	4/88
Catches/stumpings	11/–
- Source: CricketArchive, 14 October 2011

John Herman Lucas (12 June 1922 – 18 May 2008) was a former Barbados West Indian and Canadian cricketer. He was a right-handed batsman and a right-arm off-break bowler. He began his career playing for Barbados, playing twelve first-class matches. He later emigrated to Canada and played three first-class matches for the Canadian national team. He finished his career with an impressive batting average of 53.70 with a highest score of 216 not out.
