= Merlon Yarde =

Barbadian cricketer (born 1944)

Personal information
- Born: 26 April 1944 (age 82); Christ Church, Barbados
- Source: Cricinfo, 17 November 2020

Merlon Yarde (born 26 April 1944) is a Barbadian cricketer. He played in one first-class match for the Barbados cricket team in 1969/70.

== See also ==
- List of Barbadian representative cricketers
