= George Whitehall =

Barbadian cricketer (1843–1882)

Personal information
- Born: 29 March 1843; Christ Church, Barbados
- Died: 24 August 1882 (aged 39); Christ Church, Barbados
- Source: Cricinfo, 17 November 2020

George Whitehall (29 March 1843 – 24 August 1882) was a Barbadian cricketer. He played in three first-class matches for the Barbados cricket team from 1864 to 1872.

== See also ==
- List of Barbadian representative cricketers
