= Lawrence Yearwood =

Barbadian cricketer (1884–1942)

Personal information
- Born: 25 June 1884; Saint James, Barbados
- Died: 18 January 1942 (aged 57); Christ Church, Barbados
- Source: Cricinfo, 17 November 2020

Lawrence Yearwood (25 June 1884 – 18 January 1942) was a Barbadian cricketer. He played in three first-class matches for the Barbados cricket team in 1910/11.

== See also ==
- List of Barbadian representative cricketers
