= Nikolai Charles =

Barbadian cricketer (born 1986)

Personal information
- Born: 1 October 1986 (age 40); Barbados
- Source: Cricinfo, 13 November 2020

Nikolai Charles (born 1 October 1986) is a Barbadian cricketer. He played in sixteen first-class and four List A matches for the Barbados cricket team from 2008 to 2016.

== See also ==
- List of Barbadian representative cricketers
