= Robert Arthur (cricketer) =

Barbadian cricketer (1866–1948)

Personal information
- Born: 23 July 1866; Christ Church, Barbados
- Died: 1948 (aged 81–82)
- Source: Cricinfo, 11 November 2020

Robert Arthur (23 July 1866 – 1948) was a Barbadian cricketer. He played in one first-class match for the Barbados cricket team in 1896/97.

== See also ==
- List of Barbadian representative cricketers
