= Shawn Graham (cricketer) =

Barbadian cricketer (born 1977)

Personal information
- Born: 26 October 1977 (age 49); Saint George, Barbados
- Source: Cricinfo, 13 November 2020

Shawn Graham (born 26 October 1977) is a Barbadian cricketer. He played in six first-class and four List A matches for the Barbados cricket team from 1999 to 2005.

== See also ==
- List of Barbadian representative cricketers
