= Stephen Hinkson =

Barbadian cricketer (born 1942)

Personal information
- Born: 4 January 1942 (age 84); Bridgetown, Barbados
- Source: Cricinfo, 13 November 2020

Stephen Hinkson (born 4 January 1942) is a Barbadian cricketer. He played in one first-class match for the Barbados cricket team in 1973/74.

== See also ==
- List of Barbadian representative cricketers
