= Jason Haynes (cricketer) =

Barbadian cricketer (born 1981)

Personal information
- Born: 7 March 1981 (age 45); Barbados
- Source: Cricinfo, 13 November 2020

Jason Haynes (born 7 March 1981) is a Barbadian cricketer. He played in 34 first-class and 14 List A matches for the Barbados cricket team from 2002 to 2011.

== See also ==
- List of Barbadian representative cricketers
