= Robert Challenor =

Barbadian cricketer (1884–1977)

Personal information
- Born: 25 June 1884; Saint Michael, Barbados
- Died: 26 June 1977 (aged 93); Saint Michael, Barbados
- Source: Cricinfo, 13 November 2020

Robert Challenor (25 June 1884 – 26 June 1977) was a Barbadian cricketer. He played in thirteen first-class matches for the Barbados cricket team from 1904 to 1925.

== See also ==
- List of Barbadian representative cricketers
