= Ryan Layne =

Barbadian cricketer (born 1982)

Personal information
- Born: 25 December 1982 (age 43); Barbados
- Source: Cricinfo, 13 November 2020

Ryan Layne (born 25 December 1982) is a Barbadian cricketer. He played in three first-class matches for the Barbados cricket team from 2005 to 2011.

== See also ==
- List of Barbadian representative cricketers
