= Errol Millington =

Barbadian cricketer (1914–1991)

Personal information
- Born: 29 August 1914; Saint Michael, Barbados
- Died: 29 April 1991 (aged 76); Bridgetown, Barbados
- Source: Cricinfo, 13 November 2020

Errol Millington (29 August 1914 – 29 April 1991) was a Barbadian cricketer. He played in three first-class matches for the Barbados cricket team from 1946 to 1951.

== See also ==
- List of Barbadian representative cricketers
