= Eustace Smith (cricketer) =

Barbadian cricketer

Personal information
- Born: 14 August 1877; Saint George, Barbados
- Source: Cricinfo, 17 November 2020

Eustace Smith (born 14 August 1877, date of death unknown) was a Barbadian cricketer. He played in two first-class matches for the Barbados cricket team in 1897/98.

== See also ==
- List of Barbadian representative cricketers
