= Michael Clarke (Barbadian cricketer) =

Barbadian cricketer (1913–1982)

Personal information
- Full name: Michael Ian Coleridge Clarke
- Born: 21 September 1913; Strathclyde, St Michael, Barbados
- Died: 10 November 1982 (aged 69); Bay Street, St Michael, Barbados
- Batting: Right-handed
- Bowling: Right-arm fast-medium
- Role: All-rounder

Domestic team information
- Years: Team
- 1940/41: Barbados
- FC debut: 1 February 1941 Barbados v Trinidad and Tobago
- Last FC: 12 February 1941 Barbados v Trinidad and Tobago

Career statistics
Competition	First-class
Matches	2
Runs scored	212
Batting average	53.00
100s/50s	1/0
Top score	153
Balls bowled	232
Wickets	1
Bowling average	73.00
5 wickets in innings	0
10 wickets in match	0
Best bowling	1/29
Catches/stumpings	2/–
- Source: CricketArchive, 29 January 2012

Michael Ian Coleridge Clarke (21 September 1913 – 10 November 1982) was a Barbadian cricketer. Clarke was a right-handed batsman who bowled right-arm fast-medium. He was born in Strathclyde in Saint Michael, Barbados.

A member of Spartan Cricket Club, Clarke played two matches for the Barbados national cricket team against Trinidad and Tobago in 1941. In his debut first-class cricket match, he made a century—153, finally dismissed by Trinidad leg spin bowler Rupert Tang Choon. His second match was played four days later and despite another creditable effort—42 runs in the first innings—he would never play for Barbados again.
