= Edward Hoad =

Barbadian cricketer (1925–2012)

Personal information
- Born: 4 September 1925; Saint Thomas, Barbados
- Died: 13 June 2012 (aged 86)
- Source: Cricinfo, 13 November 2020

Edward Hoad (4 September 1925 – 13 June 2012) was a Barbadian cricketer. He played in nine first-class matches for the Barbados cricket team from 1944 to 1954.

== See also ==
- List of Barbadian representative cricketers
