= William Hoad =

Barbadian cricketer (1885–1920)

Personal information
- Born: 7 October 1885; Saint Michael, Barbados
- Died: 24 January 1920 (aged 34); Bridgetown, Barbados
- Source: Cricinfo, 13 November 2020

William Hoad (7 October 1885 – 24 January 1920) was a Barbadian cricketer. He played in six first-class matches for Barbados and Trinidad and Tobago from 1901 to 1906.

== See also ==
- List of Barbadian representative cricketers
