= Noel Lucas =

Barbadian cricketer (1926–2009)

Personal information
- Born: 13 December 1926; Saint Michael, Barbados
- Died: 4 July 2009 (aged 82); Toronto, Ontario, Canada
- Source: Cricinfo, 13 November 2020

Noel Lucas (13 December 1926 – 4 July 2009) was a Barbadian cricketer. He played in three first-class matches for the Barbados cricket team in 1953/54 and 1954/55.

== See also ==
- List of Barbadian representative cricketers
