= Keith Walcott =

Barbadian cricketer (1924–2006)

Personal information
- Born: 8 March 1924; Saint Michael, Barbados
- Died: 11 July 2006 (aged 82); Barbados
- Source: Cricinfo, 17 November 2020

Keith Walcott (8 March 1924 – 11 July 2006) was a Barbadian cricketer. He played in fifteen first-class match for the Barbados cricket team from 1940 to 1952. Walcott was also a vice-president of Barbados Cricket Association.

== See also ==
- List of Barbadian representative cricketers
