= Stephen Rudder =

Barbadian cricketer (1872–1954)

Personal information
- Born: 7 September 1872; Saint Michael, Barbados
- Died: June 1954; Saint Michael, Barbados
- Source: Cricinfo, 13 November 2020

Stephen Rudder (7 September 1872 – June 1954) was a Barbadian cricketer. He played in nine first-class matches for Barbados and Trinidad and Tobago from 1895 to 1902.
