= John Hoad (cricketer) =

Barbadian cricketer (1891–1971)

Personal information
- Born: 8 October 1891; Saint Michael, Barbados
- Died: 1 December 1971 (aged 80); Bridgetown, Barbados
- Source: Cricinfo, 13 November 2020

John Hoad (8 October 1891 – 1 December 1971) was a Barbadian cricketer. He played in three first-class matches for the Barbados cricket team from 1919 to 1922.

== See also ==
- List of Barbadian representative cricketers
