= Don Browne (cricketer) =

Barbadian cricketer (1892–1975)

Personal information
- Full name: Clement Fraser Browne
- Born: 8 January 1892; Christ Church, Barbados
- Died: 15 November 1975 (aged 83); Saint Peter, Barbados
- Source: Cricinfo, 11 November 2020

Don Browne (8 January 1892 – 15 November 1975) was a Barbadian cricketer. He played in eleven first-class matches for the Barbados cricket team from 1919 to 1927.

== See also ==
- List of Barbadian representative cricketers
