= Francis Speed (Barbadian cricketer) =

Barbadian cricketer (1849–1906)

Personal information
- Born: 13 November 1849; Saint John, Barbados
- Died: 5 March 1906 (aged 56); Dartford, England
- Source: Cricinfo, 17 November 2020

Francis Speed (13 November 1849 – 5 March 1906) was a Barbadian cricketer. He played in one first-class match for the Barbados cricket team in 1871/72.

== See also ==
- List of Barbadian representative cricketers
