= Herbert Bailey =

Barbadian cricketer

Personal information
- Full name: Herbert Packer Bailey
- Born: 5 December 1889; St Michael, Barbados
- Died: 31 July 1917 (aged 27); Hollebeke, West Flanders, Belgium

Domestic team information
- Years: Team
- 1909–10: Barbados

Career statistics
Competition	First-class
Matches	3
Runs scored	26
Batting average	8.66
100s/50s	–/–
Top score	13
Balls bowled	66
Wickets	8
Bowling average	8.25
5 wickets in innings	1
10 wickets in match	–
Best bowling	6/12
Catches/stumpings	1/0
- Source: Cricinfo, 1 August 2020

Herbert Packer Bailey MC (5 December 1889 – 31 July 1917) was a Barbadian first-class cricketer and British Army officer.

== Life and military career ==
Born in St Michael on 5 December 1889, Bailey appeared in three first-class matches for Barbados, all in the Inter-Colonial Tournament. In his debut, playing British Guiana at the Kensington Oval on 13 January 1909, Bailey scored 13 runs in his first inning, but did not bat in the second. During his next two matches, Bailey scored 8 runs and took 8 wickets for 28 runs as a bowler.

During the First World War, Bailey enlisted as a private in the Artists Rifles. He was commissioned as a temporary second lieutenant on probation in the East Surrey Regiment on 5 September 1916, becoming attached to a mortar battery. Bailey was awarded the Military Cross for bravery in action near St. Eloi on 7 June 1917. The citation read:

For conspicuous gallantry and devotion to duty. He displayed the greatest gallantry in handling a Stokes gun, following the first line infantry up to the final objective, where he consolidated later in the day. He showed great judgment, and was instrumental in repelling an enemy counter-attack by the skilful use of his gun.

— The London Gazette, 24 August 1917

Bailey was killed in action several weeks later at Hollebeke on 31 July 1917. His body was not recovered or identified, and he is commemorated on the Menin Gate.
