= Jason Parris =

Barbadian cricketer (born 1982)

Personal information
- Born: 5 June 1982 (age 44); Barbados
- Source: Cricinfo, 13 November 2020

Jason Parris (born 5 June 1982) is a Barbadian cricketer. He played in eight first-class and eight List A matches for Barbados and Combined Campuses and Colleges from 2002 to 2009.

== See also ==
- List of Barbadian representative cricketers
