= Gladstone Waithe =

Barbadian cricketer (1902–1979)

Personal information
- Born: 1902
- Died: 17 June 1979 (aged 76–77); Port of Spain, Trinidad
- Source: Cricinfo, 17 November 2020

Gladstone Waithe (1902 – 17 June 1979) was a Barbadian cricketer. He played in nine first-class matches for the Barbados cricket team from 1928 to 1941.

== See also ==
- List of Barbadian representative cricketers
