= Stanley Worme =

Barbadian cricketer (1887–1942)

Personal information
- Born: 26 October 1887; Saint Philip, Barbados
- Died: 1942 (aged 54–55); Buffalo, New York, United States
- Source: Cricinfo, 17 November 2020

Stanley Worme (26 October 1887 – 1942) was a Barbadian cricketer. He played in tenfirst-class matches for the Barbados cricket team from 1908 to 1913.

== See also ==
- List of Barbadian representative cricketers
