= Edward Evelyn (cricketer) =

Barbadian cricketer

Personal information
- Born: 27 December 1864; Christ Church, Barbados
- Source: Cricinfo, 13 November 2020

Edward Evelyn (born 27 December 1864, date of death unknown) was a Barbadian cricketer. He played in one first-class match for the Barbados cricket team in 1883/84.

== See also ==
- List of Barbadian representative cricketers
