= Geoffrey Foster (West Indian cricketer) =

West Indian cricketer (born 1935)

Cricket information
- Batting: Left-handed
- Bowling: Slow left arm orthodox

Career statistics
Competition	First-class
Matches	6
Runs scored	86
Batting average	10.75
100s/50s	0/0
Top score	28*
Balls bowled	1,266
Wickets	14
Bowling average	31.57
5 wickets in innings	0
10 wickets in match	0
Best bowling	4/31
Catches/stumpings	6/–
- Source: CricketArchive, 10 October 2022

Geoffrey Michael Foster (born 5 April 1935) is a former West Indian cricketer. He played six first-class games for Barbados, including one appearance against Trinidad in the 1961–62 Pentangular Tournament. His best innings figures of 4/31 came on debut, against Jamaica at Kingston in 1958–59.
