= Thomas Speed (cricketer) =

Barbadian cricketer (1843–1896)

Personal information
- Born: 7 April 1843; Saint George, Barbados
- Died: July 1896; Saint Michael, Barbados
- Source: Cricinfo, 17 November 2020

Thomas Speed (7 April 1843 – July 1896) was a Barbadian cricketer. He played in one first-class match for the Barbados cricket team in 1864/65.

== See also ==
- List of Barbadian representative cricketers
