= Henry Burnett (cricketer) =

Barbadian cricketer

Personal information
- Born: 20 July 1851; Saint Peter, Barbados
- Source: Cricinfo, 11 November 2020

Henry Burnett (born 20 July 1851, date of death unknown) was a Barbadian cricketer. He played in one first-class match for the Barbados cricket team in 1871/72.

== See also ==
- List of Barbadian representative cricketers
