= James Packer (cricketer) =

Barbadian cricketer

Personal information
- Born: 2 December 1847; Saint Michael, Barbados
- Source: Cricinfo, 13 November 2020

James Packer (born 2 December 1847, date of death unknown) was a Barbadian cricketer. He played in one first-class match for the Barbados cricket team in 1865/66.

== See also ==
- List of Barbadian representative cricketers
