= Neal Phillips =

Barbadian cricketer

Personal information
- Full name: Neal Anderson Phillips
- Born: 20 January 1956; Holder's Hill, Saint James, Barbados
- Died: 26 December 2022 (aged 66)
- Batting: Right-handed
- Bowling: Right-arm medium

Domestic team information
- Years: Team
- 1981: Staffordshire
- 1978/79–1984/85: Barbados

Career statistics
Competition	First-class	List A
Matches	15	8
Runs scored	370	139
Batting average	17.61	34.75
100s/50s	0/1	0/0
Top score	51	47
Balls bowled	2,226	342
Wickets	39	4
Bowling average	29.33	70.25
5 wickets in innings	0	–
10 wickets in match	0	–
Best bowling	4/35	2/33
Catches/stumpings	8/–	3/–
- Source: Cricinfo, 28 September 2018

Neal Anderson Phillips (20 January 1956 – 26 December 2022) was a Barbadian first-class cricketer.

Phillips was born at Holder's Hill in the parish of Saint James, Barbados. He made his debut for Barbados in a List A one-day match against Guyana in April 1979 in the Geddes Grant/Harrison Line Trophy, with Phillips featuring in a further match in that years competition. He played minor counties cricket for Staffordshire in England in the summer of 1981. Having not featured for Barbados since his two initial one-day matches in 1979, Phillips made a return to the Barbadian side, returning to one-day action in the 1982/83 Geddes Grant/Harrison Line Trophy.

He made his debut in first-class cricket in January 1983 against the Leeward Islands in the Shell Shield. He continued to play first-class and List A one-day cricket for Barbados until the 1984/85 season, having by that point played a total of 15 first-class and eight List A matches for Barbados. He scored 350 runs in first-class cricket, with a highest score of 51; bowling he took 39 wickets at an average of 29.33, though he did not take a five wicket haul, his best bowling figures were 4/35. In List A matches he scored 139 runs, with a top score of 47; however, he had less impact as a bowler in the one-day game, taking just three wickets. Following his retirement from first-class cricket, Phillips became a groundsman.

Phillips died in December 2022, at the age of 66.
