= Winslow Ashby =

Barbadian cricketer (1953–2024/2025)

Personal information
- Full name: Winslow Edwin Stewart Ashby
- Born: 13 May 1953; Clarkes Land, Deacons Road, Saint Michael, Barbados
- Died: 2024 or 2025 (aged 71)
- Batting: Right-handed
- Role: Batsman

Domestic team information
- Years: Team
- 1970/71–1974/75: Barbados
- Source: Cricinfo, 11 November 2020

Winslow Edwin Stewart Ashby (13 May 1953 – 2024 or 2025) was a Barbadian cricketer. He played in eleven first-class matches for Barbados from 1971 to 1975.

Ashby died in late 2024 or early 2025.
