= Tyrone Knight =

Barbadian cricketer (born 1954)

Personal information
- Full name: Tyrone Bentley Knight
- Born: 22 January 1954 (age 72); Saint Michael, Barbados
- Role: Bowler

Domestic team information
- Years: Team
- 1978: Barbados
- Source: CricketArchive, 6 September 2016

Tyrone Bentley Knight (born 22 January 1954) is a former Barbadian cricketer who represented the Barbadian national team in West Indian domestic cricket.

Knight was born in Saint Michael Parish, Barbados. In 1974, he was selected to tour England with the West Indies under-19s, playing three Test matches against the England under-19s. Knight opened the bowling with future West Indies international Wayne Daniel in the first match, and took 4/52 and 4/42, dismissing future England internationals Chris Tavaré and Mike Gatting in both innings. In the second Test, he took 3/61 and 8/86, finishing with match figures of 11/147. Both his second-innings figures and his match figures set new records for under-19 Test cricket. Knight finished with 25 wickets from his three under-19 Tests. Despite his performance at that level, his career in senior West Indian domestic cricket was limited to just two matches, both of which came in the 1977–78 Geddes Grant/Harrison Line Trophy. He appeared in both of Barbados' matches at the tournament, against Jamaica and the Windward Islands.
