= Wes Packer =

Welsh comedian

Wes Packer (born 1977) is a former Welsh comedian from the Rhondda Valleys in Wales, UK.

He began his comedy career at Poncho Comedy Club, at the 'A Shot in The Dark' coffee shop in Cardiff in 2005.

In August 2006 he won the comedy newcomer award So You Think You're Funny?, at which point he was still working full-time as a computer programmer.

As a result, Wes went on to perform at the Just For Laughs Comedy Festival in Montreal, Quebec in 2007 alongside Frank Skinner, Jimmy Carr, Richard Herring, Michael McIntyre, John Moloney and Mickey Hutton.

He has been described as an energetic and fearless act with 'a bard-like narrative talent'.
