= Trevor Campbell (cricketer) =

Barbadian cricketer (born 1950)

Personal information
- Born: 15 November 1950 (age 75); Saint Michael, Barbados
- Source: Cricinfo, 13 November 2020

Trevor Campbell (born 15 November 1950) is a Barbadian cricketer. He played in one first-class match for the Barbados cricket team in 1969/70.

== See also ==
- List of Barbadian representative cricketers
