= John Kidney (cricketer) =

Barbadian cricketer (1888–1962)

Personal information
- Born: 29 October 1888; Saint Michael, Barbados
- Died: 18 October 1962 (aged 73); Saint Michael, Barbados
- Source: Cricinfo, 13 November 2020

John Kidney (29 October 1888 – 18 October 1962) was a Barbadian cricketer. He played in eleven first-class matches for the Barbados cricket team from 1908 to 1932.

== See also ==
- List of Barbadian representative cricketers
