= Edwin Hoad =

Barbadian cricketer (1870–1946)

Personal information
- Born: 17 September 1870; Saint Michael, Barbados
- Died: 1946 (aged 75–76); Saint Michael, Barbados
- Source: Cricinfo, 13 November 2020

Edwin Hoad (17 September 1870 – 1946) was a Barbadian cricketer. He played in one first-class match for the Barbados cricket team in 1896/97.

== See also ==
- List of Barbadian representative cricketers
