= Richard Batson =

Barbadian cricketer (1891–1971)

Personal information
- Born: 11 June 1891; Saint Michael, Barbados
- Died: 25 January 1971 (aged 79); London, England
- Source: Cricinfo, 11 November 2020

Richard Batson (11 June 1891 – 25 January 1971) was a Barbadian cricketer. He played in six first-class matches for the Barbados cricket team from 1909 to 1923.

== See also ==
- List of Barbadian representative cricketers
