= Edward Packer =

Barbadian cricketer (1855–1932)

Personal information
- Born: 9 July 1855; Saint Michael, Barbados
- Died: 3 December 1932 (aged 77); Christ Church, Barbados
- Source: Cricinfo, 13 November 2020

Edward Packer (9 July 1855 – 3 December 1932) was a Barbadian cricketer. He played in three first-class matches for the Barbados cricket team from 1883 to 1888.

== See also ==
- List of Barbadian representative cricketers
