= Lawrence Maxwell (cricketer) =

Barbadian cricketer (born 1941)

Personal information
- Born: 17 January 1941 (age 85); Saint Philip, Barbados
- Source: Cricinfo, 13 November 2020

Lawrence Maxwell (born 17 January 1941) is a Barbadian cricketer. He played in sixteen first-class and two List A matches for the Barbados cricket team from 1968 to 1979.

== See also ==
- List of Barbadian representative cricketers
