= Greg Armstrong =

West Indies cricketer (born 1950)

Gregory de Lisle Armstrong (born 11 May 1950) was a West Indies cricketer who was an assistant manager in the 1982-83 rebel tour of South Africa.

Born in Saint Michael, Barbados, a right-arm fast bowler, Armstrong showed promise in his first season with Barbados in 1973–74, taking 4 for 45 on debut against Trinidad in Bridgetown. He was selected for the President's XI match against MCC a few days later but failed to take a wicket, and he played only a minor part in Barbados's victory over the MCC later in the tour. He had a stint with Glamorgan after they signed him in 1974. He took 45 wickets at 31.00 in the 1975 season, including career-best figures of 6 for 91 against Warwickshire at Swansea, but he was unable to settle into a rhythmic run-up, and bowled an excessive number of no-balls. He was even less successful in 1976, with 25 wickets at 37.08, and his county contract was not renewed. He returned to Barbados and played three matches in 1977–78, hitting his highest score of 93, batting at number nine, against Combined Leeward and Windward Islands at Castries, but took only one wicket.

In his first-class career from 1973–74 to 1977–78 he scored 642 runs at 15.28 in 40 matches, and took 91 wickets at 35.15.

After the rebel tour the West Indian authorities banned him for life.
