= Tyrone Greenidge =

Barbadian cricketer (1965–1993)

Personal information
- Full name: Witney Tyrone Greenidge
- Born: 16 May 1965; Saint James, Barbados
- Died: 19 November 1993 (aged 28); Bridgetown, Barbados
- Source: Cricinfo, 13 November 2020

Tyrone Greenidge (16 May 1965 – 19 November 1993) was a Barbadian cricketer. He played in one List A and five first-class matches for the Barbados cricket team in 1985/86 and 1986/87. He died of leukemia in 1993.

== See also ==
- List of Barbadian representative cricketers
