= Michael Walcott =

Barbadian cricketer (born 1952)

Personal information
- Born: 22 March 1952 (age 74); Bridgetown, Barbados
- Source: Cricinfo, 17 November 2020

Michael Walcott (born 22 March 1952) is a Barbadian cricketer. He played in one first-class match for the Barbados cricket team in 1974/75.

== See also ==
- List of Barbadian representative cricketers
