= Victor Walcott =

Barbadian cricketer (born 1962)

Personal information
- Born: 12 April 1962 (age 64); Christ Church, Barbados
- Source: Cricinfo, 17 November 2020

Victor Walcott (born 12 April 1962) is a Barbadian cricketer. He played in twenty first-class and nineteen List A matches for the Barbados cricket team from 1987 to 1994.

== See also ==
- List of Barbadian representative cricketers
