= Walter Goodman (cricketer) =

Barbadian cricketer (1872–1910)

Personal information
- Born: 29 September 1872; Saint Philip, Barbados
- Died: 13 April 1910 (aged 37); Georgetown, Penang Island, Malaya
- Source: Cricinfo, 13 November 2020

Walter Goodman (29 September 1872 – 13 April 1910) was a Barbadian cricketer. He played in fifteen first-class matches for Barbados, and British Guiana from 1891 to 1902.
