= Michael Mayers =

Barbadian cricketer (1884–1925)

Personal information
- Born: 29 September 1884; Christ Church, Barbados
- Died: 26 July 1925 (aged 40); Saint Michael, Barbados
- Source: Cricinfo, 13 November 2020

Michael Mayers (29 September 1884 – 26 July 1925) was a Barbadian cricketer. He played in four first-class matches for the Barbados cricket team from 1905 to 1909.

== See also ==
- List of Barbadian representative cricketers
