= Lear Wood =

Barbadian cricketer (1885–1977)

Personal information
- Full name: Lear Oderic Wood
- Born: 12 November 1885; Saint George, Barbados
- Died: 31 December 1977 (aged 92); Saint Peter, Barbados
- Source: Cricinfo, 17 November 2020

Lear Oderic Wood (12 November 1885 – 31 December 1977) was a Barbadian cricketer. He played in one first-class match for the Barbados cricket team in 1924/25.
