= Winston Reid (cricketer) =

West Indian cricketer (born 1962)

Winston Reid (born 29 September 1962 in Barbados) is a former West Indian cricketer. He was a left-handed batsman and a left-arm spin bowler. He played 100 first-class and List A matches for his native Barbados, including the cricket tournament at the 1998 Commonwealth Games.
