= Whitney Greenidge =

Barbadian cricketer (born 1933)

Personal information
- Full name: Norman Whitney Greenidge
- Born: 6 May 1933 (age 93); Saint Michael, Barbados
- Source: Cricinfo, 13 November 2020

Whitney Greenidge (born 6 May 1933) is a Barbadian cricketer who played four first-class matches for his national team between 1958 and 1961.

== See also ==
- List of Barbadian representative cricketers
