= List of Trinidadian representative cricketers =

List of cricketers

This is a list of all cricketers who have played first-class, List A or Twenty20 cricket for the Trinidad and Tobago national cricket team in the West Indies. Seasons given are first and last seasons; the player did not necessarily play in all the intervening seasons.

A number of calypsos have been created and sung about these cricketers and can be found here: List of calypso songs about cricket.

== A ==
- Ellis Achong, 1929/30–1934/35
- Edward Acton, 1900/01–1904/05
- Allman Agard, 1934/35–1937/38
- Joseph Agostini, 1891/92–1896/97
- Edgar Agostini, 1875/76–1895/96
- Andy Aleong, 1960/61–1963/64
- Eddie Aleong, 1953/54–1965/66
- Nicholas Alexis, 2016/17
- Imtiaz Ali, 1993/94
- Imtiaz Ali, 1972/73–1979/80
- Inshan Ali, 1966/67–1979/80
- Jamiel Ali, 1962/63–1966/67
- Syed Ali, 1936/37–1942
- Zaheer Ali, 2000/01–2002/03
- Atiba Allert, 2008/09–2011/12
- Eugene Antoine, 1990/91–1996/97
- Giles Antoine, 1982/83–1985/86
- Alfred Arrowsmith, 1907/08
- Gregory Asgarali, 1968/69–1971/72
- Nyron Asgarali, 1940/41–1959/60
- Ivan Ashtine, 1943/44
- Denis Atkinson, 1947/48–1949/50
- C Attale, 1894/95–1896/97 (Note: Attale played in four first-class matches for Trinidad from 1894/95 to 1896/97. No biographical details are known.)
- David Audain, 1977/78–1981/82
- Jonathan Augustus, 2004/05–2013/14

== B ==
- Kent Babb, 1954/55–1960/61 (Note: Born in 1934, Babb played five times in first-class matches for Trinidad as well as in three first-class matches for South Trinidad against North Trinidad between 1958–59 and 1961–62. He took 26 first-class wickets and scored 144 runs, with his only five-wicket haul (5/64) and highest score (40 runs) coming on debut against Jamaica in February 1955.)
- Shazam Babwah, 2002/03–2006
- Rishi Bachan, 2004/05–2008/09
- Samuel Badree, 2001/02–2013/14
- DC Bailey, 1910/11 (Note: Bailey played in six first-class matches for Trinidad in the 1910/11 season. No biographical details are known.)
- Kenrick Bainey, 1974/75–1984/85
- Lennox Balgobin, 1969/70
- Anil Balliram, 1993/94–1999/2000
- Desmond Baptiste, 1969/70–1977/78
- Adrian Barath, 2006/07–2013/14
- Marlon Barclay, 2011/12–2012/13
- Prince Bartholomew, 1968/69–1976/77
- Amarnath Basdeo, 1996/97–1997/98
- Rodney Belgrave, 1908/09
- Oliver Bennett, 1907/08–1910/11
- Berrington, 1876/77 (Note: Berrington played in a single first-class match for Trinidad in the 1876/77 season. No biographical details are known.)
- Mario Belcon, 2006–2007/08
- Nelson Betancourt, 1905–1929/30
- Narine Bidhesi, 1989/90–1992/93
- Lionel Birkett, 1929/30–1938/39
- Ian Bishop, 1986/87–1999/2000
- Renwick Bishop, 1986/87–1996/97
- Marlon Black, 1993/94–2003/04
- Mahadeo Bodoe, 1984/85–1996/97
- Ronald Boyack, 1924/25
- JW Branch, 1900/01–1901/02 (Note: Branch played in four first-class matches for Trinidad from 1900/01 to 1901/02. No biographical details are known.)
- Dwayne Bravo, 2001/02–2018/19
- Darren Bravo, 2006/07–2019/20
- T Brereton, 1868/69 (Note: Brereton played in two first-class matches for Trinidad in the 1868/69 season. No biographical details are known.)
- L Brooker, 1901/02 (Note: Brooker played in a single first-class match for Trinidad in the 1901/02 season. No biographical details are known.)
- Darryl Brown, 1999/2000–2002/03
- G Brown, 1897/98 (Note: Brown played in a single first-class match for Trinidad in the 1897/98 season. No biographical details are known.)
- Patrick Burke, 1941/42
- Harold Burnett, 1942–1946/47
- Alec Burns, 1978/79–1980/81
- George Bushe, 1875/76–1882/83 (Note: Bushe played in two first-class matches for Trinidad in 1875/76 and 1882/83. No biographical details are known.)
- Lennox Butler, 1948/49–1955/56

== C ==
- Selwyn Caesar, 1959/60–1963/64
- Joey Carew, 1953/54–1973/74
- Michael Carew, 1988/89–1993/94
- Yannic Cariah, 2010–2019/20
- D Casey, 1893/94–1897/98 (Note: Casey played in two first-class matches for Trinidad in 1893/94 and 1897/98. No biographical details are known.)
- F Castillo, 1909/10 (Note: Castillo played in a single first-class match for Trinidad in the 1909/10 season. No biographical details are known.)
- Teshwan Castro, 2011/12–2012/13
- Hugh Cezair, 1934/35 (Note: Cezair played in a single first-class match for Trinidad in the 1934/35 season. No biographical details are known.)
- Navin Chan, 1999/2000–2002/03
- Bryan Charles, 2014/15–2019/20
- Selwyn Charles, 1959/60
- Lionel Christiani, 1929/30
- Andre Cipriani, 1908/09–1926/27
- A Cipriani, 1868/69 (Note: Cipriani played in two first-class matches for Trinidad in the 1868/69 season. No biographical details are known.)
- Mikey Cipriani, 1911/12–1912/13
- R Cipriani, 1899/1900 (Note: Cipriani played in a single first-class match for Trinidad in the 1899/1900 season. No biographical details are known.)
- Andrew Clarke, 1966/67–1967/68
- Bro Collins, 1882/83–1891/92 (Note: Collins played in three first-class matches for Trinidad from 1882/83 to 1891/92. No biographical details are known.)
- Fish Collins, 1882/83–1895/96 (Note: Collins played in two first-class matches for Trinidad in 1882/83 and 1895/96. No biographical details are known.)
- Elias Constantine, 1931/32–1948/49
- Learie Constantine, 1921/22–1934/35
- Lebrun Constantine, 1893/94–1922/23
- Akiel Cooper, 2010–2017/18
- Cephas Cooper, 2019/20
- Kevon Cooper, 2008/09–2014/15
- Kenneth Corbie, 1951/52–1953/54 (Note: Corbie played in three first-class matches for Trinidad in 1951/52 and 1953/54. No biographical details are known.)
- Osmond Corbie, 1957/58–1961/62
- Alvin Corneal, 1959/60–1970/71
- Sheldon Cottrell, 2016/17–2017/18
- Percy Cox, 1901/02–1905
- John Crawford, 1912/13–1923/24 (Note: Crawford played in two first-class matches for Trinidad in 1912/13 and 1923/24. No biographical details are known.)
- Daron Cruickshank, 2008/09–2013/14
- Theo Cuffy, 1975/76–1982/83
- Archie Cumberbatch, 1896/97–1905
- C. P. Cumberbatch, 1909/10–1921/22

== D ==
- Lionel D'Ade, 1895/96–1905
- CE Damian, 1893/94 (Note: Damian played in a single first-class match for Trinidad in the 1893/94 season. No biographical details are known.)
- Alston Daniel, 1980/81–1982/83
- Joshua Da Silva, 2018/19–2019/20
- Bryan Davis, 1959/60–1970/71
- Charlie Davis, 1960/61–1972/73
- Derone Davis, 2014/15
- Gregory Davis, 1990/91
- Wilfred Debissette, 1982/83–1984/85
- Arnot de Boissiere, 1895/96 (Note: de Boissiere played in a single first-class match for Trinidad in the 1895/96 season. No biographical details are known.)
- V de Boissiere, 1897/98 (Note: de Boissiere played in a single first-class match for Trinidad in the 1897/98 season. No biographical details are known.)
- Edgar de Gannes, 1891/92–1893/94
- Ferdinand de Gannes, 1909/10–1922/23
- Horace Deighton, 1867/68–1868/69
- Oliver Demming, 1951/52–1953/54
- D de Montbrun, 1893/94 (Note: de Montbrun played in two first-class matches for Trinidad in the 1893/94 season. No biographical details are known.)
- Narsingh Deonarine, 2015/16
- Richard de Souza, 1964/65–1972/73
- George Dewhurst, 1919/20–1929/30
- Deonarine Deyal, 1986/87
- Mark Deyal, 2014/15
- Rajindra Dhanraj, 1987/88–2000/01
- Anthony Dharson, 1983/84
- Keith D'Heurieux, 1972/73–1982/83
- Mervyn Dillon, 1996/97–2007/08
- Bridget Durity, 1973/74 (Note: Durity played four first-class matches for Trinidad and Tobago in 1973–74. He played two other first-class matches for South Trinidad, one in each of 1973–74 and 1974–75.)
- Oscar Durity, 1969/70–1972/73
- Ananda Dwarika, 1986/87–1988/89

== E ==
- William Eccles, 1868/69 (Note: Eccles played in two first-class matches for Trinidad in the 1868/69 season. No biographical details are known.)
- J Eckstein, 1899/1900 (Note: Eckstein played in a single first-class match for Trinidad in the 1899/1900 season. No biographical details are known.)
- Bruce Eligon, 1965/66
- Donald Eligon, 1933/34–1936/37
- Russel Elvin, 1991/92–1993/94
- Rayad Emrit, 2003/04–2018/19

== F ==
- Ronald Faria 1967/68–1978/79
- Philo Ferguson, 1959/60 (Note: Ferguson played in four first-class matches for Trinidad in the 1959/60 season. No biographical details are known.)
- Wilfred Ferguson, 1942/43–1955/56
- H Fitt, 1905 (Note: Fitt played in a single first-class match for Trinidad in the 1905 season. No biographical details are known.)
- Thomas Fitzherbert, 1903/04
- Delbert Fitzpatrick, 1943/44–1951/52
- M Forde, 1951/52 (Note: Forde played in two first-class matches for Trinidad in the 1951/52 season. No biographical details are known.)
- Nigel Francis, 1992/93–1997/98
- Cyril Fraser, 1922/23–1928/29 (Note: Fraser played in seven first-class matches for Trinidad from 1922 to 1929. No biographical details are known.)
- George Fung, 1936/37
- Carl Furlonge, 1952/53–1960/61
- David Furlonge, 1981/82–1984/85
- Hammond Furlonge, 1954/55–1961/62
- Kenneth Furlonge, 1957/58–1966/67

== G ==
- Richard Gabriel, 1968/69–1985/86
- Shannon Gabriel, 2009/10–2018/19
- P Gajadhar, 1908/09 (Note: Gajadhar played in a single first-class match for Trinidad in the 1908/09 season. No biographical details are known.)
- D'Arcy Galt, 1936/37–1947/48
- Edward Gammon, 1909/10
- Daren Ganga, 1996/97–2012/13
- Sherwin Ganga, 2003/04–2013/14
- Hermat Gangapersad, 1986/87–1992/93
- Andy Ganteaume, 1940/41–1962/63
- GL Garcia, 1868/69–1875/76 (Note: Garcia played in two first-class matches for Trinidad in the 1868/69 season. No biographical details are known.)
- Garnet Gilman, 1985/86–1987/88
- Connell Gittens, 1896/97–1897/98 (Note: Gittens played in three first-class matches for Trinidad in the 1896/97 and 1897/98 seasons. No biographical details are known.)
- Randolph Glasgow, 1984/85
- Gerry Gomez, 1936/37–1955/56
- Larry Gomes, 1971/72–1987/88
- Sheldon Gomes, 1968/69–1982/83
- Egerton Gomez, 1911/12 (Note: Gomez played in two first-class matches for Trinidad in the 1911/12 season. No biographical details are known.)
- Gregory Gomez, 1977/78 (Note: Gomez played in a single List A match for Trinidad in the 1977/78 season. No biographical details are known.)
- Nicholas Gomez, 1985/86
- MG Gooding, 1891/92 (Note: Gooding played in two first-class matches for Trinidad in the 1891/92 season. No biographical details are known.)
- Jyd Goolie, 2016/17–2019/20
- Sanjiv Gooljar, 2005/06–2006/07
- Danraj Gopiesingh, 1977/78
- F Gransaull, 1905 (Note: Gransaull played in a single first-class match for Trinidad in the 1905 season. No biographical details are known.)
- Fred Grant, 1923/24–1926/27
- George Grant, 1875/76–1876/77 (Note: Grant played in a single first-class match for Trinidad in the 1876/77 season. No biographical details are known.)
- Jackie Grant, 1933/34–1934/35
- Rolph Grant, 1933/34–1938/39
- Tony Gray, 1983/84–1995/96
- John Green, 1935/36–1937/38
- Ellis Grell, 1910/11
- Mervyn Grell, 1923/24–1937/38
- Justin Guillen, 2008/09–2015/16
- Noel Guillen, 1951/52–1953/54
- Sammy Guillen, 1947/48–1952
- Victor Guillen, 1921/22
- Subhash Gupte, 1963/64

== H ==
- Wes Hall, 1966/67–1969/70
- Abdul Hamid, 1922/23–1923/24 (Note: Hamid played in a single first-class match for Trinidad in the 1922/23 season. No biographical details are known.)
- Leonard Harbin, 1935/36–1940/41
- Albert Harding, 1945/46–1952
- N Hargreaves, 1907/08 (Note: Hargreaves played in two first-class matches for Trinidad in the 1907/08 season. No biographical details are known.)
- Bertie Harragin, 1896/97–1931/32
- Norton Hart, 1905–1910/11 (Note: Hart played in eleven first-class matches for Trinidad from 1905 to 1910/11. No biographical details are known.)
- W Haynes, 1898/99 (Note: Haynes played in a single first-class match for Trinidad in the 1898/99 season. No biographical details are known.)
- Kenneth Hazel, 1993/94–2000/01
- Moses Hector, 1904/05–1910/11 (Note: Hector played in nine first-class matches for Trinidad from 1904/05 to 1910/11. No biographical details are known.)
- A Hendrickson, 1891/92 (Note: A Hendrickson played in two first-class matches for Trinidad in the 1891/92 season. No biographical details are known.)
- Joseph Hendrickson, 1937/38–1940/41 (Note: Hendrickson played in a single first-class match for Trinidad in the 1940/41 season. No biographical details are known.)
- Randolph Hezekiah, 1955/56
- Terrance Hinds, 2019/20
- William Hoad, 1903/04–1905/06
- Hobson, 1891/92 (Note: Hobson played in a single first-class match for Trinidad in the 1891/92 season. No biographical details are known.)
- David Holford, 1962/63
- Kyle Hope, 2015/16–2019/20
- Akeal Hosein, 2012/13–2019/20
- Errol Hunte, 1928/29–1933/34
- Roland Hutcheon, 1941/42 (Note: Hutcheon played in a single first-class match for Trinidad in the 1941/42 season. No biographical details are known.)
- H Hutton, 1893/94–1897/98 (Note: Hutton played in six first-class matches for Trinidad from 1893/94 to 1897/98. No biographical details are known.)

== J ==
- GRA Jack, 1893/94 (Note: Jack played in a single first-class match for Trinidad in the 1893/94 season. No biographical details are known.)
- Andy Jackson, 2000/01–2003/04
- Sydney Jagbir, 1934/35–1952
- Amit Jaggernauth, 2003/04–2013/14
- Jon-Russ Jaggesar, 2015/16–2019/20
- Ricky Jaipaul, 2013/14–2017/18
- Denzil James, 2001/02
- Asif Jan, 1999/2000–2001/02
- Imran Jan, 1999/2000–2004/05
- Amir Jangoo, 2016/17–2018/19
- George John, 1909/10–1925/26
- Leo John, 1963/64–1968/69
- Tyrell Johnson, 1935/36–1938/39
- WM Johnson, 1908/09–1910/11 (Note: Johnson played in two first-class matches for Trinidad in 1908/09 and 1910/11. No biographical details are known.)
- Prior Jones, 1936/37–1950/51
- Harold Joseph, 1980/81–1987/88
- J Joseph, 1912/13 (Note: Joseph played in a single first-class match for Trinidad in the 1912/13 season. No biographical details are known.)
- Bernard Julien, 1968/69–1981/82
- Ashmead Jumadeen, 1991/92
- Jerry Jumadeen, 1999/2000
- Raphick Jumadeen, 1970/71–1980/81
- Shamshuddin Jumadeen, 1981/82–1982/83

== K ==
- Aneil Kanhai, 2001/02–2011/12
- Ben Kanhai, 1952/53–1953/54 (Note: Kanhai played in four first-class matches for Trinidad from 1952/53 to 1953/54. No biographical details are known.)
- Rohan Kanhai, 1964/65
- Kavesh Kantasingh, 2010–2015/16
- Steven Katwaroo, 2011/12–2019/20
- Richard Kelly, 2004/05–2011
- Joseph Kelshall, 1911/12–1919/20
- Imran Khan, 2004/05–2019/20
- Frank King, 1950/51
- AB Knox, 1867/68–1868/69 (Note: Knox played in two first-class matches for Trinidad in the 1868/69 season. No biographical details are known.)
- Davindra Krishna, 2003/04

== L ==
- A Lamy, 1882/83 (Note: Lamy played in a single first-class match for Trinidad in the 1882/83 season. No biographical details are known.)
- Brian Lara, 1987/88–2007/08
- Oliver Lashley, 1943/44
- O Latour, 1903/04 (Note: Latour played in a single first-class match for Trinidad in the 1903/04 season. No biographical details are known.)
- Andre Lawrence, 1993/94–1998/99
- George Learmond, 1900/01–1910/11
- Ralph Legall, 1946/47–1957/58
- Mandilhon Leotaud, 1891/92–1894/95
- Anthony Lewis, 1969/70–1971/72
- Evin Lewis, 2011/12–2018/19
- Gerald Liddlelow, 1923/24–1928/29
- Gus Logie, 1978/79–1991/92
- Alfred Low, 1896/97–1900/01
- Joseph Lucas, 1898/99–1903/04
- Kyron Lynch, 2004/05
- Randall Lyon, 1975/76–1982/83

== M ==
- Ralph McGregor, 1931/32–1933/34 (Note: McGregor played in four first-class matches for Trinidad from 1931/32 to 1933/34. No biographical details are known.)
- C McLean, 1882/83–1887/88 (Note: McLean played in a single first-class match for Trinidad in the 1882/83 season. No biographical details are known.)
- Andrew McLeod, 1978/79–1980/81 (Note: McLeod played in nine List A matches for Trinidad from 1978/79 to 1980/81. No biographical details are known.)
- Bernard McLeod, 1974/75–1977/78
- Donald McLeod, 1986/87–1989/90
- Arthur Maingot, 1910/11–1919/20
- Kissoondath Magram, 2019/20
- Gregory Mahabir, 2000/01–2005/06
- Ganesh Mahabir, 1982/83–1987/88
- Robert Mahabir, 1988/89–1994/95
- Surujdath Mahabir, 1993/94
- Rajkumar Mahadeo, 1991/92
- R Maingot, 1919/20 (Note: Maingot played in two first-class matches for Trinidad in the 1919/20 season. No biographical details are known.)
- Vivian Maingot, 1919/20–1923/24 (Note: Maingot played in a single first-class match for Trinidad in the 1919/20 season. No biographical details are known.)
- Rajindra Mangallie, 1992/93–1994/95
- Tishan Maraj, 2003/04–2010/11
- Ruskin Mark, 1976/77
- Edgar Marsden, 1948/49
- Norman Marshall, 1953/54–1954/55
- Victor Marshall, 1954/55 (Note: Marshall played in two first-class matches for Trinidad in the 1954/55 season. No biographical details are known.)
- Keno Mason, 1992/93–2001/02
- Hugo Massey, 1891/92–1895/96 (Note: Massey played in six first-class matches for Trinidad from 1891/92 to 1895/96. No biographical details are known.)
- Leopold Matthieu, 1875/76–1882/83 (Note: Matthieu played in two first-class matches for Trinidad in the 1875/76 and 1882/83 seasons. No biographical details are known.)
- JW Mayers, 1898/99 (Note: Mayers played in a single first-class match for Trinidad in the 1898/99 season. No biographical details are known.)
- Arthur Maynard, 1934/35
- Cyril Merry, 1929/30–1938/39
- David Merry, 1940/41
- Kenneth Miller, 1981/82
- Marcus Minshall, 1959/60–1961/62
- Theodore Modeste, 2000/01–2006/07
- Dave Mohammed, 2000/01–2012/13
- David Mohammed, 1984/85–1990/91
- Gibran Mohammed, 2003/04–2011/12
- Jason Mohammed, 2005/06–2019/20
- Noor Mohammed, 1977/78 (Note: Mohammed played in fourteen first-class matches for Trinidad in the 1977/78 season. No biographical details are known.)
- Lewis Moorsom, 1868/69
- Prakash Moosai, 1981/82–1985/86
- Reynold Morgan, 1973/74 (Note: Morgan played in eleven first-class matches for Trinidad in the 1973/74 season. No biographical details are known.)
- Runako Morton, 2010/11
- Uthman Muhammad, 2015/16–2019/20
- Colin Murray, 1973/74–1980/81
- Deryck Murray, 1960/61–1980/81
- Lance Murray, 1956/57

== N ==
- Magnum Nanan, 2007/08–2008/09 (Note: Nanan played in three first-class matches for Trinidad in the 2008/09 season. No biographical details are known.)
- Rangy Nanan, 1972/73–1990/91
- Sunil Narine, 2008/09–2018/19
- Samad Niamat, 1940/41
- Ewart Nicholson, 2015/16–2017/18
- William Nock, 1891/92
- Jack Noreiga, 1961/62–1971/72

== O ==
- Arnold Oliver, 1975/76
- Sylvester Oliver, 1954/55–1957/58
- Charles Ollivierre, 1894/95
- Helon Ollivierre, 1903/04
- Mike Olton, 1959/60
- Kjorn Ottley, 2012/13–2016/17
- Yannick Ottley, 2012–2019/20
- Ronald Outridge, 1956/57

== P ==
- Charles Packer, 1899/1900–1901/02
- Hollister Pajotte, 2000/01
- Victor Pascall, 1905/06–1926/27
- Arthur Paul, 1963/64–1965/66 (Note: Paul played in eleven first-class matches for Trinidad from 1963/64 to 1965/66. No biographical details are known.)
- EG Penalosa, 1868/69–1893/94 (Note: Penalosa played in six first-class matches for Trinidad from 1868/69 to 1893/94. No biographical details are known.)
- J Pereira, 1895/96–1897/98 (Note: Pereira played in two first-class matches for Trinidad in 1895/96 and 1897/98. No biographical details are known.)
- William Perkins, 2006–2012/13
- Chatterpaul Persaud, 1940/41
- Mukesh Persad, 1994/95–2002/03
- Vishal Persad-Maharaj, 1998/99
- Edward Peter, 1936/37
- Buxton Peters, 1955/56–1959/60
- Anderson Phillip, 2016/17–2019/20
- Claude Phillip, 1972/73–1974/75
- Khary Pierre, 2012–2019/20
- Lance Pierre, 1940/41–1949/50
- C Piggott, 1912/13–1923/24 (Note: Piggott played in a single first-class match for Trinidad in the 1912/13 season. No biographical details are known.)
- JA Pinder, 1898/99–1907/08 (Note: Pinder played in fifteen first-class matches for Trinidad from 1898/99 to 1907/08. No biographical details are known.)
- D Plummer, 1895/96–1897/98 (Note: Plummer played in two first-class matches for Trinidad in 1895/96 and 1897/98. No biographical details are known.)
- Ernest Plummer, 1895/96–1896/97
- ET Pocock, 1882/83 (Note: Pocock played in a single first-class match for Trinidad in the 1882/83 season. No biographical details are known.)
- HM Pollard, 1893/94–1901/02 (Note: Pollard played in eight first-class matches for Trinidad from 1893/94 to 1901/02. No biographical details are known.)
- Kieron Pollard, 2006–2018/19
- Ponsonby, 1876/77 (Note: Ponsonby played in a single first-class match for Trinidad in the 1876/77 season. No biographical details are known.)
- Nicholas Pooran, 2012/13–2018/19
- Cecil Pouchet, 1937/38–1948/49
- Ricardo Powell, 2003/04–2006
- E Power, 1867/68–1875/76 (Note: Power played in two first-class matches for Trinidad in the 1868/69 season. No biographical details are known.)
- Roshon Primus, 2016/17–2017/18

== R ==
- Narine Ragoo, 1962/63–1978/79
- Suruj Ragoonath, 1988/89–2000/01
- Adron Rahim, 1990/91
- Aneil Rajah, 1979/80–1987/88
- Emile Rajah, 2011/12
- Isaiah Rajah, 2016/17–2019/20
- Sonny Ramadhin, 1949/50–1952/53
- Rudolph Ramatali, 1956/57 (Note: Ramatali played in ten first-class matches for Trinidad in the 1956/57 season. No biographical details are known.)
- Donald Ramsamooj, 1952–1956/57
- Denesh Ramdin, 2004/05–2019/20
- Nicholas Ramjass, 2006
- Dudnath Ramkissoon, 1969/70–1977/78
- Dinanath Ramnarine, 1993/94–2003/04
- Premnath Ramnath, 1981/82–1982/83
- Harry Ramoutar, 1964/65–1969/70
- Ravi Rampaul, 2001/02–2018/19
- Ramkaran Ramperass, 1981/82–1982/83
- Capil Rampersad, 1983/84–1987/88
- Denis Rampersad, 1996/97–2000/01
- Abdul Razack, 1923/24
- Kurban Razack, 1934/35
- AC Reece, 1905 (Note: Reece played in a single first-class match for Trinidad in the 1905 season. No biographical details are known.)
- Denzil Regis, 1980/81 (Note: Regis played in a single List A match for Trinidad in the 1980/81 season. No biographical details are known.)
- Arden Reid, 1955/56
- JL Ritchie, 1926/27 (Note: Ritchie played in a single first-class match for Trinidad in the 1926/27 season. No biographical details are known.)
- Marlon Richards, 2012/13–2017/18
- Mervyn Richardson, 1985/86
- Clifford Roach, 1923/24–1937/38
- Alphonso Roberts, 1956/57
- Kenneth Roberts, 1957/58–1965/66 (Note: Roberts played in ten first-class matches for Trinidad from 1957/58 to 1965/66. No biographical details are known.)
- Lincoln Roberts, 1995/96–2002/03
- Pascall Roberts, 1960/61–1973/74
- Noel Robinson, 1961/62
- Walter Robinson, 1882/83–1887/88 (Note: Robinson played in a single first-class match for Trinidad in the 1882/83 season. No biographical details are known.)
- Willie Rodriguez, 1953/54–1969/70
- Joseph Rogers, 1908/09–1921/22
- JA Romeo, 1901/02–1905 (Note: Romeo played in nine first-class matches for Trinidad from 1901/02 to 1905. No biographical details are known.)
- Leon Romero, 1998/99–2000/01
- Stephen Rudder, 1896/97
- Earnil Ryan, 2003/04

== S ==
- Vernon Sadahpal, 1969/70
- Balkaram Sagram, 1976/77–1977/78
- Gopaul Sahadeo, 1979/80–1983/84
- Daniel St Clair, 2014/15–2019/20
- Dean St Hilaire, 1983/84–1988/89
- Cyl St Hill, 1928/29 (Note: St Hill played in a single first-class match for Trinidad in the 1928/29 season. No biographical details are known.)
- Edwin St Hill, 1923/24–1929/30
- Wilton St Hill, 1911/12–1929/30
- Avidesh Samaroo, 1995/96–1999/2000
- Sookval Samaroo, 1940/41–1942/43
- Chiki Sampath, 1948/49–1953/54
- Roland Sampath, 1980/81–1983/84
- William Sarel, 1904/05–1905/06
- Noble Sarkar, 1942
- J Saturnin, 1893/94 (Note: Saturnin played in a single first-class match for Trinidad in the 1893/94 season. No biographical details are known.)
- EG Scott, 1893/94 (Note: Scott played in a single first-class match for Trinidad in the 1893/94 season. No biographical details are known.)
- Ben Sealey, 1923/24–1940/41
- Derek Sealy, 1935/36–1948/49
- EP Serrett, 1887/88–1893/94 (Note: Serrett played in three first-class matches for Trinidad from 1891 to 1894. No biographical details are known.)
- William Shepherd, 1896/97
- Richard Sieuchan, 1986/87–1990/91
- Keagan Simmons, 2019/20
- Lendl Simmons, 2001/02–2018/19
- Phil Simmons, 1982/83–2000/01
- Charran Singh, 1959/60–1961/62
- Robin Singh, 1982/83–1983/84
- Clarence Skeete, 1941/42–1952
- Nigel Slinger, 1959/60
- Joe Small, 1909/10–1931/32
- Wayne Smart, 1967/68 (Note: Smart played in two first-class matches for Trinidad in the 1967/68 season. No biographical details are known.)
- CR Smith, 1898/99–1909/10 (Note: Smith played in nine first-class matches for Trinidad from 1898 to 1910. No biographical details are known.)
- H Smith, 1901/02 (Note: Smith played in a single first-class match for Trinidad in the 1901/02 season. No biographical details are known.)
- M Smith, 1891/92–1898/99 (Note: Smith played in twelve first-class matches for Trinidad from 1891 to 1899. No biographical details are known.)
- Odean Smith, 2018/19–2019/20
- Richard Smith, 1990/91–2002/03
- Sydney Smith, 1899/1900–1905/06
- Jeremy Solozano, 2012/13–2019/20
- Nicholas Sookdeosingh, 2014/15
- Rodney Sooklal, 1999/2000–2005/06
- Ethelred Sorzano, 1975/76–1978/79
- Charles Spooner, 1937/38
- Navin Stewart, 2008/09–2013/14
- Jeff Stollmeyer, 1937/38–1956/57
- Vic Stollmeyer, 1935/36–1945/46
- David Sultan, 1991/92–1992/93
- John Suraj, 1983/84 (Note: Suraj played in three first-class matches for Trinidad in the 1983/84 season. No biographical details are known.)

== T ==
- A Taitt, 1894/95–1895/96 (Note: Taitt played in two first-class matches for Trinidad in the 1894/95 and 1895/96 seasons. No biographical details are known.)
- Rupert Tang Choon, 1934/35–1954/55
- Jaswick Taylor, 1953/54–1959/60
- Kenton Thompson, 2003/04 (Note: Thompson played in two first-class matches for Trinidad in the 2003/04 season. No biographical details are known.)
- FW Thorburn, 1901/02 (Note: Thorburn played in two first-class matches for Trinidad in the 1901/02 season. No biographical details are known.)
- Arthur Trestrail, 1937/38–1946/47
- Kenneth Trestrail, 1943/44–1949/50
- EA Turpin, 1907/08–1909/10 (Note: Turpin played in four first-class matches for Trinidad from 1907/08 and 1909/10. No biographical details are known.)

== U ==
- JO Urich, 1897/98–1901/02 (Note: Urich played in two first-class matches for Trinidad in the 1897/98 and 1901/02 seasons. No biographical details are known.)

== W ==
- AV Waddell, 1921/22–1925/26 (Note: Waddell played in four first-class matches for Trinidad from 1921/22 to 1925/26. No biographical details are known.)
- Osmond Wallace, 1903/04 (Note: Wallace played in a single first-class match for Trinidad in the 1903/04 season. No biographical details are known.)
- William Waller, 1942–1942/43
- FT Warburton, 1868/69 (Note: Warburton played in two first-class matches for Trinidad in the 1868/69 season. No biographical details are known.)
- Broderick Warner, 1876/77
- Charles Warner, 1867/68–1868/69
- Henry Warner, 1876/77
- Aucher Warner, 1886/87–1901/02
- Thornton Warner, 1876/77–1894/95
- Tion Webster, 2016/17–2019/20
- Eugène Wehekind, 1875/76–1882/83 (Note: Wehekind played in two first-class matches for Trinidad in the 1876/77 and 1882/83 seasons. No biographical details are known.)
- Peter Whiteman, 1968/69
- Archie Wiles, 1919/20–1935/36
- David Williams, 1982/83–1998/99
- Kenneth Williams, 1983/84–1993/94
- Kelvin Williams, 1981/82–1989/90
- Philton Williams, 2015/16
- C Wilson, 1894/95 (Note: Wilson played in a single first-class match for Trinidad in the 1894/95 season. No biographical details are known.)
- J Wilson, 1904/05–1905 (Note: Wilson played in a six first-class matches for Trinidad in the 1904/05 season. No biographical details are known.)
- Float Woods, 1893/94–1900/01

== Y ==
- W Yeates, 1922/23–1931/32 (Note: Yeates played in a six first-class matches for Trinidad from 1922/23 to 1931/32. No biographical details are known.)
- Clint Yorke, 1986/87–1992/93
