= National Cricket Centre, Couva =

Cricket and football ground in Couva, Trinidad and Tobago

National Cricket Centre
- Sir Frank Worrell Development Centre
- Interactive map of National Cricket Centre

Ground information
- Location: Couva, Trinidad and Tobago
- Country: Trinidad and Tobago
- Coordinates: 10.4221°N 61.4163°W
- Establishment: 2002

International information
- Only WODI: 16 March 2003: West Indies v Sri Lanka

Team information
Trinidad and Tobago	(2002/03–2015/16)
- As of 5 March 2022; Source: Ground profile

The National Cricket Centre is a cricket ground in Couva, Trinidad and Tobago, located near the Ato Boldon Stadium and the National Cycling Centre.

== History ==
Construction of the National Cricket Centre began in 1995, with the purchase of 17.5 acres (7.1 ha) of land in Couva by the Trinidad and Tobago Cricket Board from Caroni (1975) Ltd., a former sugar producing company. Construction began in 1997 and took five years, with the centre opening in June 2002. Facilities at the centre included the development centre, administrative hub and indoor cricket nets. Trinidad and Tobago first played at the ground in a first-class match against West Indies B in the 2002–03 Carib Beer Cup, with ground being intermittently used for first-class fixtures by Trinidad until 2010. In March 2003, the centre played host to a Women's One Day International between West Indies women and Sri Lanka women. The centre was one of three venues selected in Trinidad as practice venues for the 2007 Cricket World Cup. In November 2007, plans were unveiled to install floodlights and to erect a multipurpose pavilion with a seating capacity of 3,000. Major cricket returned to the centre in 2015, following a five-year hiatus. In January 2015, the centre hosted its first List A one-day match between the Leeward Islands and the West Indies under-19 team in the Regional Super50, (Note: Two List A matches were due to be played at the centre on 15 and 17 January, but were abandoned without a ball bowled.) with the centre hosting a further neutral match in that seasons competition. A further two neutral one-day matches were played there in the Regional Super50. First-class cricket too returned to the centre, with Trinidad and Tobago playing a further five first-class matches there in 2015 and 2016. An access road at the centre was named in honour of Sonny Ramadhin, following his death in February 2022.

== Records ==
=== First-class ===
- Highest team total: 406 all out (twice)

- By Trinidad and Tobago v West Indies B, 2002–03
- By Trinidad and Tobago v Leeward Islands, 2015–16

- Lowest team total: 125 all out by Trinidad and Tobago v Windward Islands, 2014–15
- Highest individual innings: 223 by Aneil Kanhai for West Indies B v Trinidad and Tobago, 2002–03
- Best bowling in an innings: 6-59 by Kenroy Peters for Windward Islands v Trinidad and Tobago, 2014–15
- Best bowling in a match: 9-109 by Amit Jaggernauth for Trinidad and Tobago v Leeward Islands, 2006–07

=== List A ===
- Highest team total: 257 for 9 (50 overs) by Jamaica v ICC Americas, 2015–16
- Lowest team total: 137 all out (47 overs) by West Indies under-19's v Jamaica, 2014–15
- Highest individual innings: 113 not out by Rahkeem Cornwall for Leeward Islands v West Indies under-19's, 2014–15
- Best bowling in an innings: 3 for 26 by Jonathan Carter for Barbados v Jamaica, 2015–16

== See also ==
- List of cricket grounds in the West Indies
