= Sampath =

Sampath is a given name and surname, meaning prosperity or wealth in Hindu/Sanskrit.

== Given name ==
- K. V. Sampath Kumar (1956/1957–2021), Indian newspaper editor
- P. Sampath Kumar, Indian politician
- P. A. Sampath Kumar, Indian Priest
- R. Sampath Raj (born 1969), Indian politician
- Sampath Amaratunge (born 1964), Sri Lankan academic and administrator
- Sampath Kumar (1950–2009), Indian actor known by his stage name Vishnuvardhan
- Sampath Kumar D.Y. (1927–1999), Indian dancer and choreographer
- Sampath Kuttymani (born 1986), Indian footballer
- Sampath Lakmal de Silva (c. 1982–2006), Sri Lankan journalist
- Sampath Nandi (born 1980), Indian film director
- Sampath Parthasarathy
- Sampath Perera (born 1965), Sri Lankan football manager
- Sampath Perera (cricketer) (born 1982), Sri Lankan cricketer
- Sampath Raj (born 1968), Indian actor
- Sampath Ram, Indian actor
- Sampath Tennakoon (1959–2021), Sri Lankan actor

== Surname ==
- A. G. Sampath, Indian politician
- Anirudhan Sampath (born 1962), Indian politician
- Balaji Sampath (born 1973), Indian educationist and social activist
- Chaminda Sampath, Sri Lankan politician
- Chiki Sampath (1920–1990), Trinidadian cricketer
- E. V. K. Sampath (c. 1926–1977), Indian politician
- Janaka Sampath (born 1987), Sri Lankan cricketer
- Jai Sampath (born 1984), Indian actor
- Kuppuswami Sampath, Indian footballer
- M. C. Sampath, Indian politician
- Nanjil Sampath, Indian politician
- Nuwan Sampath (born 1996), Sri Lankan cricketer
- Ram Sampath (born 1977), Indian musical artist
- Roland Sampath (born 1957), Trinidadian cricketer
- Shanaka Sampath (born 1991), Sri Lankan cricketer
- Srinivasan Sampath (born 1961), Indian electrochemist, nanotechnologist and professor
- Suranga Sampath, Sri Lankan blind cricketer
- Thusara Sampath (born 1974), Sri Lankan cricketer
- Tillakaratne Sampath (born 1982), Sri Lankan cricketer
- V. S. Sampath (born 1950), 18th Chief Election Commissioner of India
- Vikram Sampath, Indian historian
- Devang Sampat, executive, current Managing Director of Cinépolis India

== See also ==
- Mavinakere Cheluvayyangar (1904–1983), Indian film actor better known by his stage name Sampath
