= Kenneth Miller =

Ken, Kenneth or Kenny Miller may refer to:

== Politics ==
- Ken A. Miller (born 1966), Oklahoma state treasurer
- Ken J. Miller (1962–2024), member of the North Carolina House of Representatives
- Ken Miller (Montana politician) (born 1957), member of the Montana State Senate

== Sports ==
- Ken Miller (gridiron football) (1941–2024), head coach of the Saskatchewan Roughriders
- Ken Miller (American football) (born 1958), American football cornerback
- Kenny Miller (basketball) (born 1967), former basketball player
- Kenny Miller (born 1979), Scottish footballer
- Kenneth Miller (cricketer) (born 1958), Trinidadian cricketer

== Other ==
- Ken Miller (curator) (born 1963), curator, writer-editor
- Ken Miller (television producer) (born 1952), senior vice president of Spelling Television
- Kenneth G. Miller (born 1956), American geologist
- Kenneth P. Miller (born 1948), American political scientist
- Kenneth R. Miller (born 1948), American biologist known for his role in Kitzmiller v. Dover Area School District
- Kenneth Hayes Miller (1876–1952), American painter and teacher

== See also ==
- Kenneth Millar (1915–1983), American-Canadian writer
