= Ken Williams =

Ken or Kenneth Williams may refer to:

== Sports ==
- Ken Williams (baseball) (1890–1959), American baseball outfielder
- Kenneth Williams (New Zealand cricketer) (1882–1920), New Zealand cricketer
- Ken Williams (Australian footballer) (1918–1977), Australian footballer for Collingwood
- Ken Williams (footballer, born 1927), English professional footballer
- Kenneth Williams (swimmer) (born 1937), British Olympic swimmer
- Ken Williams (basketball), American college basketball player
- Kenneth Williams (Trinidadian cricketer) (born 1968), Trinidadian cricketer
- P. J. Williams (Kenneth Lamar Williams, born 1993), American football cornerback

== Other ==
- Kenneth Williams (politician) (1870–1935), Reform Party Member of Parliament in New Zealand
- Kenneth P. Williams (1887–1958), American mathematician
- Kenneth Williams (1926–1988), British actor
- Kenneth L. Williams (1934–2017), American herpetologist
- Ken Williams (songwriter) (1939–2022), American songwriter, music producer and singer
- Ken Williams (composer) (born 1952), Canadian composer for film and television
- Ken Williams (game developer) (born 1954), computer game developer and founder of Sierra On-Line
- Kenneth T. Williams (born 1965), Cree playwright
- Kenneth Williams (serial killer) (1979–2017), American serial killer executed in Arkansas

== See also ==
- Kenny Williams (disambiguation)
