= Aneil =

Aneil is a male given name. Notable people with the name include:

- Aneil Kanhai (born 1982), Trinidadian cricketer
- Aneil Nambiar (born 1984), Indian cricketer
- Aneil Rajah (born 1955), Trinidadian cricketer

== See also ==
- Anil (given name)
