= West Indies B cricket team =

Third-tier national team

West Indies B
Team information
- Colours: Maroon
- Founded: 2000

History
- Four Day wins: 0
- WICB Cup wins: 1
- Twenty20 wins: 0
- Official website: Windward Island Cricket Board

The West Indies 'B' cricket team is a List A cricket team that participates in the West Indian domestic List A tournament and was formerly also a first-class cricket team that participated in the West Indian domestic First Class competition from the 2000–01 season to the 2003–04 season. It is selected by the West Indies Cricket Board (WICB) from players who had been unable to secure a contract with one of the seven other existing regional teams, and is restricted to players under the age of 23 (with a few exceptions). West Indies B had little on-field success during its time in the competition (although a number of future internationals spent time in its squad), and the team was disbanded prior to the 2004–05 season after a wider reorganisation of domestic cricket in the region. It was reconstituted in June 2018 for participation in the inaugural Global T20 Canada competition with the intention of exposing and adding to the development of developing players who could become future international players. It subsequently participated in the 2018–19 Regional Super50 competition and in the 2019–20 Regional Super50 (where it was named as West Indies Emerging Team). The team has enjoyed more success in the List A format than it did in the First Class format, as it placed third in its group in the 2018–19 season (after suffering the most no results of any team in the group) and won the 2019–20 season.

== History ==
The West Indies Cricket Board (WICB) introduced the West Indies B team for the 2000–01 Busta Cup. Mike Findlay, the WICB's chairman of selectors, said that the team was introduced to give "young players the incentive to go on playing", as a number of young players were quitting cricket after under-19 level because they could not secure a contract with one of the regional teams. Selection for West Indies B was restricted to players under the age of 23, but for the first two seasons the team was captained by an experienced older player (Richie Richardson in 2000–01 and Roland Holder in 2001–02).

West Indies B played a total of 28 matches across four seasons, winning just four matches during that time. In the 2000–01 Busta Cup, the team placed seventh out of eight teams, winning only against the Windward Islands (by 162 runs). West Indies B finished eighth the following season, again winning only once (defeating Bangladesh A by 59 runs). The team was winless in the 2002–03 Carib Beer Cup, but in the 2003–04 Carib Beer Cup won two matches to finish sixth overall. It had a higher turnover of players during its four seasons, with only nine players playing more than one season with the team.

In a reorganisation of West Indian cricket prior to the 2004–05 season, it was decided to disband West Indies B and return to the old format of six regional teams, which had last been used during the 1995–96 season. The extended competitions were said to have "burdened a financially insecure organisation with heavy running costs", while also diluting the standard of play.

It was reconstituted in June 2018 for participation in the inaugural Global T20 Canada competition whereupon it won four and lost two of its six matches in the group stage to enter the playoff stage. It won its first playoff (against eventual champions Vancouver Knights) to enter the final which it lost to the same team. In total the team played 8 matches in the tournament, of which it won 5 and lost 3.

In the 2018–19 Regional Super50 competition the team played a total of 8 matches, winning 2 and losing 2 and experiencing 4 no results (the most of any team in its group), and placed third in the group and did not advance to the semi-finals. The team (as the West Indies Emerging Team) had a much better showing in the 2019–20 Regional Super50 season. It played 8 matches in the group stage, winning 4 and losing 3 and only experiencing 1 no result, placing second in the group and advancing to the semi-finals. The team beat Barbados in the first semi-final to advance to the final. They beat the Leeward Islands by 205 runs to win their first title in the competition.

== List of players ==
Players in bold played international cricket for the West Indies, either before or after playing for West Indies B. Players marked with an asterisk (*) played their only first-class cricket for West Indies B.

- (Grenada) Camilus Alexander
- (Trinidad and Tobago) Zaheer Ali
- (Jamaica) **Fabian Allen**
- (Guyana) Krishna Arjune
- (Guyana) Vishal Arjune*
- (Dominica) Alick Athanaze
- (Barbados) **Ryan Austin**
- (Montserrat) **Lionel Baker**
- (Jamaica) **Carlton Baugh**
- (Montserrat) **Ronsford Beaton**
- (Barbados) **Sulieman Benn**
- (Barbados) Jason Bennett
- (Jamaica) **David Bernard**
- (Barbados) Camarie Boyce
- (Guyana) Anthony Bramble
- (Barbados) **Patrick Browne**
- (Trinidad and Tobago) Yannic Cariah
- (Grenada) Roland Cato
- (Trinidad and Tobago) Bryan Charles
- (Trinidad and Tobago) Cephas Cooper
- (Trinidad and Tobago) Joshua Da Silva
- (Trinidad and Tobago) **Narsingh Deonarine**
- (Barbados) Dominic Drakes
- (Jamaica) **Shawn Findlay**
- (Guyana) **Assad Fudadin**
- (Grenada) Dennis George
- (Guyana) Andrew Gonsalves
- (Barbados) Justin Greaves
- (Jamaica) Derval Green
- (Guyana) Reon Griffith
- (Barbados) Keon Harding
- (Barbados) Jason Haynes
- (Anguilla) Chaka Hodge
- (Dominica) Kavem Hodge
- (Barbados) Chemar Holder
- (Trinidad and Tobago) **Roland Holder**
- (Jamaica) **Danza Hyatt**
- (Guyana) Tevin Imlach
- (Jamaica) Lorenzo Ingram
- (Trinidad and Tobago) **Amit Jaggernauth**
- (Trinidad and Tobago) Denzil James
- (Saint Kitts and Nevis) Shane Jeffers
- (Trinidad and Tobago) Leonardo Julien
- (Trinidad and Tobago) Kirstan Kallicharan
- (Trinidad and Tobago) Aneil Kanhai
- (Jamaica) **Brandon King**
- (Jamaica) **Jermaine Lawson**
- (Jamaica) Jermaine Levy
- (Barbados) Callitos Lopez
- (Saint Kitts and Nevis) Jeremiah Louis
- (Trinidad and Tobago) Gregory Mahabir
- (Saint Vincent and the Grenadines) Kenroy Martin
- (Barbados) Antonio Mayers
- (Saint Vincent and the Grenadines) **Obed McCoy**
- (Saint Lucia) Kimani Melius
- (Trinidad and Tobago) Satish Naidoo*
- (Guyana) Ashmead Nedd
- (Barbados) Martin Nurse
- (Barbados) Ryan Nurse
- (Jamaica) **Donovan Pagon**
- (Saint Vincent and the Grenadines) **Kenroy Peters**
- (Dominica) Wayne Phillip
- (Trinidad and Tobago) **Khary Pierre**
- (Trinidad and Tobago) **Nicholas Pooran**
- (Saint Vincent and the Grenadines) Gidron Pope
- (Saint Kitts and Nevis) Elsroy Powell
- (Guyana) **Ryan Ramdass**
- (Trinidad and Tobago) **Denesh Ramdin**
- (Antigua and Barbuda) **Austin Richards**
- (Jamaica) Andrew Richardson
- (Antigua and Barbuda) **Richie Richardson**
- (Jamaica) Jeavor Royal
- (Guyana) **Sherfane Rutherford**
- (Jamaica) **Marlon Samuels**
- (Trinidad and Tobago) Jayden Seales
- (Barbados) Anderson Sealy
- (Trinidad and Tobago) Keagan Simmons
- (Trinidad and Tobago) **Lendl Simmons**
- (Guyana) Kevin Sinclair
- (Jamaica) **Odean Smith**
- (Trinidad and Tobago) Rodney Sooklal
- (Barbados) Shamar Springer
- (Barbados) Antonio Thomas
- (Guyana) Rayon Thomas
- (Jamaica) **Dwight Washington**
- (Barbados) Kurt Wilkinson
- (Nevis) Tonito Willett
- (Barbados) Kenroy Williams

== See also ==
- Cricket Australia XI, a similar team for Australian players
- Unicorns, a similar team for English players
