= Trestrail =

Trestrail is a surname. Notable people with the surname include:

- Alfred Trestrail (1876–1935), English lawyer and cricketer
- Arthur Trestrail (1921–2014), Trinidad cricketer
- Kenneth Trestrail (1927–1992), West Indian and Canadian cricketer
- Nicholas Trestrail (1858–1922), British mining engineer
