= Durity =

Durity is a surname. Notable people with the surname include:

- Bridget Durity (born 1951), Trinidadian cricketer
- Oscar Durity (born 1950), Trinidadian cricketer
