= Shrimanthana Magalu =

Shreemanthana Magalu
- Directed by: A. V. Sheshagiri Rao
- Written by: Swagath Shukla; Dialogues: Chi. Udaya Shankar; Lyrics: Chi. Udaya Shankar; R. N. Jayagopal
- Screenplay by: Swagath Shukla
- Produced by: Chandanmal Bafna; Ugamchand Kataria; Dalichand Jain; Swagath Shukla; Ramesh Singavi
- Starring: Vishnuvardhan; Jayanthi; Udaya Kumar; Vajramuni; Chandra Shekhar; K. S. Ashwath; Balakrishna
- Cinematography: Annayya; Mallik
- Edited by: P. Bhakthavathsalam
- Music by: G. K. Venkatesh
- Release date: 1977
- Running time: 138 minutes
- Country: India
- Language: Kannada

Shreemanthana Magalu or Shrimanthana Magalu (transl. Aristocrat's Daughter) is a 1977 Kannada film, directed by A. V. Sheshagiri Rao, starring actors Vishnuvardhan and Jayanthi.

== Cast ==
- Vishnuvardhan as Shankar
- Jayanthi as Uma
- Udaya Kumar as Veerappa
- Vajramuni as Chandu
- Chandra Shekhar as Ramesh
- K. S. Ashwath as Dayananda Rao
- Balakrishna as Militory Subbanna
- Dwarakish as Kumar
- Prabhakar as Kaala
- Dr. Sampath Kumar
- Joker Shyam
- G. N. Swamy
- Jr. Shetty
- Guggu
- Kannada Raju
- Mahadevappa
- Jayalakshmi as Roopa
- B. Jayashree as Savithramma
- Meena Babu
- Jasmini
- Kairunnisa

== Soundtrack ==
1. "Kannugalu Kamalagalu" singer: S. Janaki, lyrics: Chi. Udaya Shankar
2. "Mangaana Moreya Nodu" singer: S. Janaki, lyrics: Chi. Udaya Shankar
3. "Hey Undadi Gunda" singer: SPB, S. Janaki, lyrics: Chi. Udaya Shankar
4. "Bandide Hosavasantha" singer: SPB, lyrics: Chi. Udaya Shankar
5. "Beeso Gaali Indu" singer: SPB, S. Janaki, lyrics: R. N. Jayagopal
