= Dasari =

Dasari may refer to:

- Dasari (caste), in Telangana region in Andhra Pradesh, India
- Dasari Narayana Rao (1942–2017), Indian film director
- DVV Danayya (born 1961), Indian film producer
- Dasari Gopi Krishna, better known as V. Gopi Krishna, popular cinematographer in Indian films
- Dasari Yethiraja Sampath Kumar, shortly Sampath Kumar D.Y., popularly known as "Andhra Jalari" an Indian dancer
- Dasari Yoganand (1922–2006), South Indian film director
- Sree Dasari, International fame award winner 2019, Who is Participated in UK Big Brother 10 reality TV show and Won best housemate Award of the series, Students' Union President of the University of Hertfordshire 2009–10.
