= Krishna Arjune =

Guyanese cricketer (born 1980)

Personal information
- Born: 3 September 1980 (age 46); Unity Village, Guyana
- Batting: Right-handed
- Bowling: Right-arm off-spin
- Role: Opening batsman
- Relatives: Vishal Arjune (brother)

Domestic team information
- Years: Team
- 2002: West Indies B
- 2003–2009: Guyana
- Source: CricketArchive, 19 November 2016

Krishna Arjune (born 3 September 1980) is a former Guyanese cricketer who represented Guyana and West Indies B in West Indian domestic cricket. He played as a right-handed opening batsman.

Arjune was born in Unity Village, in Guyana's Demerara-Mahaica region. His younger brother, Vishal Arjune, also played cricket at a high level. Arjune made his first-class debut in the 2001–02 Busta Cup, playing for West Indies B (an under-23 development team). In his second match of the tournament, against Trinidad and Tobago, he scored 109 not out and carried his bat. For the 2002–03 season, Arjune secured a contract with Guyana. He played seven seasons in total with the national team, with his final appearances coming in the 2008–09 Regional Four Day Competition. Arjune's highest first-class score came in the 2005–06 Carib Beer Cup, when he made 157 from 291 balls against the Leeward Islands.
