= Bainey =

Bainey is a surname. Notable people with the surname include:

- Kenrick Bainey (born 1955), Trinidadian cricketer
- Tim Bainey Jr. (born 1978), American stock car racing driver
