= Adron =

Adron is a given name. Notable people with the name include:

- Adron Chambers (born 1986), American baseball player
- Adron Doran (1909–2001), American politician and educator
- Adron Rahim (born 1971), Trinidadian cricketer
- Adron Tennell (born 1987), American gridiron football player

== See also ==
- Andron
- ADRON-RM, Autonomous Detector of Radiation of Neutrons Onboard Rover at Mars
