= Andrew Gonsalves =

Guyanese cricketer

Personal information
- Born: 31 May 1978; Suddie, Guyana
- Batting: Right-handed
- Role: Opening batsman

Domestic team information
- Years: Team
- 1997–2002: Guyana
- 2001: West Indies B
- Source: CricketArchive, 19 November 2016

Andrew Gonsalves (born 31 May 1978) is a former Guyanese cricketer who represented Guyana and West Indies B in West Indian domestic cricket. He played as a right-handed opening batsman.

Gonsalves was born in Suddie, in Guyana's Pomeroon-Supenaam region. He made his senior debut for Guyana in the 1997–98 Red Stripe Bowl, scoring 54 runs against Canada opening the batting with West Indies international Clayton Lambert. Gonsalves made his first-class debut for Guyana in February 2000, against the Windward Islands. Later in the year, he scored two half-centuries in the 2000–01 Red Stripe Bowl, making 65 against the Leeward Islands and 71 against Bermuda. For the 2000–01 Busta Cup, Gonsalves was selected for West Indies B, a development team. He played in seven matches, but had little success with the bat, making only a single half-century. Gonsalves returned to Guyana for the 2001–02 season, but after four games in the 2001–02 Red Stripe Bowl played only one Busta Cup match. His last first-class appearance was in April 2002, for a GCB President's XI against the touring Indians.
