= Noel Robinson =

Noel Robinson may refer to:

- Noel Robinson (businessman) (born 1943), New Zealand businessman and philanthropist
- Noel Robinson (cricketer) (born 1941), Trinidadian cricketer
- Noel Robinson (musician) (born 1962), British Christian musician
- Noel Robinson (writer) (born 1928), Australian writer
