= Skeete =

Skeete is a surname of English origin. People with the name include:

- Bradley Skeete (born 1987), British boxer
- Clarence Skeete (1916–2001), Trinidadian cricketer
- Harrison Skeete (1921–2008), Caribbean-American weightlifter
- Jarvin Skeete (born 1981), Saint Lucian footballer
- Lesley-Ann Skeete (born 1967), British hurdler
- Margaret Skeete (1878–1994), American centenarian
- Oliver Skeete (born 1956), British showjumper
- Sam Skeete (born 1981), Barbadian cricketer
