= Boyack =

Boyack is a surname and may refer to one of the following:

- Alf Boyack (1877–1947), Australian rules footballer
- Pat Boyack (born 1967), American electric blues guitarist and songwriter
- Rachel Boyack, New Zealand politician
- Ronald Boyack (1906–1988), Trinidadian cricketer
- Sarah Boyack (born 1961), Scottish Labour Party politician
- Steven Boyack (born 1976), Scottish professional footballer
