= Ricky Christopher =

Antiguan cricketer (born 1975)

Personal information
- Full name: Ricky Joseph Christopher
- Born: 26 March 1975 (age 51); Antigua
- Batting: Right-handed
- Bowling: Right-arm fast

Domestic team information
- Years: Team
- 2000–2002: Leeward Islands
- Source: CricketArchive, 25 January 2016

Ricky Joseph Christopher (born 26 March 1975) is a former Antiguan cricketer who played for the Leeward Islands in West Indian domestic cricket. He played as a right-arm fast bowler.

A former West Indies under-19s player, Christopher made his first-class debut for the Leewards in January 2000, playing against Guyana in the 1999–00 Busta Cup. He was only included in the team after Carl Tuckett fell ill from eating bad fish. In the 2000–01 Busta Cup, Christopher took 26 wickets from seven matches, behind only Kerry Jeremy for the Leewards (and fifth overall). His season including figures of 5/61 in the opening game against Trinidad and Tobago and 5/32 against West Indies B. In May 2001, Christopher was named in a preliminary 22-man squad for the West Indian tour of Zimbabwe, but did not make the final cut. In the 2001–02 Red Stripe Bowl, a limited-overs tournament, he played for Antigua and Barbuda, which were competing separately for the first time. Christopher played his final matches for the Leewards in February 2002.
