= Vishal Arjune =

Guyanese cricketer (born 1981)

Personal information
- Born: 24 October 1981; Unity Village, Guyana
- Batting: Right-handed
- Bowling: Right-arm off-spin
- Role: Middle-order batsman
- Relatives: Krishna Arjune (brother)

Domestic team information
- Years: Team
- 2002: West Indies B
- Source: CricketArchive, 19 November 2016

Vishal Arjune (born 24 October 1981) is a former Guyanese cricketer who represented West Indies B in West Indian domestic cricket. He played as a right-handed middle-order batsman and occasional off-spin bowler.

Arjune was born in Unity Village, in Guyana's Demerara-Mahaica region. His older brother, Krishna Arjune, also played cricket at a high level. In 2001, Arjune was selected to tour England with the West Indies under-19 team. He played in Test and ODI series against the England under-19s, and in the second Test scored 79 against an attack that included future England internationals James Anderson and James Tredwell. Arjune made his first-class debut the following year, playing two matches for West Indies B (an under-23 development team) in the 2001–02 Busta Cup. He had little success, making 22 runs from three innings, and never played at first-class level again. His brother played alongside him in both of his first-class appearances.
