= Edward Peter =

Edward Peter may refer to:

- Percy Peter (Edward Percival Peter), English swimmer and water polo player
- Edward C. Peter II, United States Army general
- Edward Peter (cricketer), Trinidadian cricketer
