= Sampath Kumar =

Sampath Kumar is a given name and surname, meaning prosperity or wealth in Hindu/Sanskrit. People with this name include:

- K. V. Sampath Kumar (1956/1957–2021), Indian newspaper editor
- P. Sampath Kumar, Indian politician
- P. A. Sampath Kumar (1951-2015), Indian Priest
- Sampath Kumar (1950–2009), Indian actor known by his stage name Vishnuvardhan
- Sampath Kumar D.Y. (1927–1999), Indian dancer and choreographer
