= Unity Village =

Unity Village may refer to:

- Unity Village, Guyana
- Unity Village, Missouri, United States
