= William Waller (disambiguation) =

William Waller may refer to:

- Sir William Waller (c. 1597–1668), English Parliamentary general during the English Civil War
- Sir William Waller (informer) (died 1699), Middlesex justice and politician
- William Waller (cricketer) (1923-1998), Trinidadian cricketer
- William Waller (footballer) (1898–?), English footballer
- W. H. Waller, mayor of Ottawa in 1877
- Bill Waller (1926–2011), American politician, governor of Mississippi, 1972–1976
- Bill Waller (American football) (1911–2007), head football coach for the Southern Illinois Salukis
- Bill Waller Jr. (born 1952), former chief justice of the Supreme Court of Mississippi and candidate for governor in 2019
