= Surujdath Mahabir =

Trinidadian cricketer (born 1962)

Personal information
- Born: 27 October 1962 (age 64); Trinidad
- Source: Cricinfo, 28 November 2020

Surujdath Mahabir (born 27 October 1962) is a Trinidadian cricketer. He played in one List A and two first-class matches for Trinidad and Tobago in 1993/94.

He is the general secretary of the Trinidad and Tobago Cricket Board.

== See also ==
- List of Trinidadian representative cricketers
