= Audain =

Audain is a surname. Notable people with the surname include:

- Anne Audain (born 1955), New Zealand middle and long-distance runner
- Courtney Audain, American bass guitarist and musician
- David Audain (born 1956), Trinidadian cricketer
- Michael Audain (born 1937), Canadian home builder, philanthropist, and art collector
