= Léotaud =

Léotaud or Leotaud is a surname of French origin. Notable people with the name include:

- Mandilhon Leotaud (1871–1935), Trinidadian cricketer
- Vincent Léotaud (1595–1672), French Jesuit mathematician
- Robert “Bob” Léotaud (1957–Current), Entrepreneur
