= Prakash Moosai =

Trinidadian cricketer

Personal information
- Born: 4 November 1959 (age 67); Trinidad
- Source: Cricinfo, 28 November 2020

Prakash Moosai (born 4 November 1959) is a Trinidadian cricketer and currently serves as a Justice of Appeal on the Supreme Court of Judicature for Trinidad and Tobago. He played in twenty first-class and eight List A matches for Trinidad and Tobago from 1981 to 1986.

== Career ==
He received his LLB from the University of the West Indies, St. Augustine campus in 1979. He then obtained a Legal Education Certificate from the Hugh Wooding Law School and was called to the bar in 1981.

He spent sixteen years in private practice. He was appointed a temporary judge on 15 September 1997 and then became a permanent puisine judge of the High Court on 1 March 1998. Moosai was appointed a Justice of Appeal on 16 September 2013. He sat on the Adoption Board of Trinidad and Tobago and is on the steering committee for the drug treatment court.

=== Cricket career ===
He was captain of the teams at St. Mary’s College and the Tunapuna Hindu Primary School. He was on the Under-19 and Senior National Teams and captain of the West Indies Lawyer’s Cricket team. Moosai is a member of the Trinidad and Tobago Cricket Board Disciplinary Committee and chairman of the Past Cricketers Society, which raises money for former cricket players facing medical problems.

== See also ==
- List of Trinidadian representative cricketers
