= Peter Whiteman (cricketer) =

Trinidadian cricketer (born 1944)

Personal information
- Born: 15 May 1944 (age 82); Trinidad
- Source: Cricinfo, 28 November 2020

Peter Whiteman (born 15 May 1944) is a Trinidadian cricketer. He played in two first-class matches for Trinidad and Tobago in 1968/69.

== See also ==
- List of Trinidadian representative cricketers
