= Anthony Lewis (Trinidadian cricketer) =

Trinidadian cricketer (born 1949)

Personal information
- Born: 11 April 1949 (age 77); Trinidad
- Source: Cricinfo, 28 November 2020

Anthony Lewis (born 11 April 1949) is a Trinidadian cricketer. He played in eighteen first-class matches for Trinidad and Tobago from 1966 to 1972.

== See also ==
- List of Trinidadian representative cricketers
