= Tishan Maraj =

Trinidadian cricketer (born 1984)

Personal information
- Born: 22 November 1984 (age 41); Trinidad
- Source: Cricinfo, 28 November 2020

Tishan Maraj (born 22 November 1984) is a Trinidadian cricketer. He played in twelve first-class and four List A matches for Trinidad and Tobago from 2003 to 2011.

== See also ==
- List of Trinidadian representative cricketers
