= Russel Elvin =

Trinidadian cricketer (born 1965)

Personal information
- Born: 27 December 1965 (age 60); Trinidad
- Source: Cricinfo, 28 November 2020

Russel Elvin (born 27 December 1965) is a Trinidadian cricketer. He played in nine first-class and nine List A matches for Trinidad and Tobago from 1991 to 1994.

== See also ==
- List of Trinidadian representative cricketers
