= Edward Gammon =

Trinidadian cricketer

Personal information
- Born: 14 November 1876; Trinidad
- Died: 10 December 1955 (aged 79); Trinidad
- Source: Cricinfo, 28 November 2020

Edward Gammon (14 November 1876 – 10 December 1955) was a Trinidadian cricketer. He played in one first-class match for Trinidad and Tobago in 1909/10.

== See also ==
- List of Trinidadian representative cricketers
