= Anthony Dharson =

Trinidadian cricketer (born 1960)

Personal information
- Born: 28 April 1960 (age 66); Trinidad
- Source: Cricinfo, 28 November 2020

Anthony Dharson (born 28 April 1960) is a Trinidadian cricketer. He played in one List A and four first-class matches for Trinidad and Tobago in 1983/84.

== See also ==
- List of Trinidadian representative cricketers
