= Randolph Hezekiah =

Trinidadian cricketer

Personal information
- Full name: Theophilus Randolph Wilbur Hezekiah
- Born: 18 January 1936 (age 90); Trinidad
- Source: Cricinfo, 28 November 2020

Randolph Hezekiah (born 18 January 1936) is a Trinidadian cricketer. He played in one first-class match for Trinidad and Tobago in 1955/56.

== See also ==
- List of Trinidadian representative cricketers
