= Anil Balliram =

Trinidadian cricketer (born 1974)

Personal information
- Born: 27 February 1974 (age 52); Trinidad
- Source: Cricinfo, 27 November 2020

Anil Balliram (born 27 February 1974) is a Trinidadian cricketer. He played in 25 first-class and 3 List A matches for Trinidad and Tobago from 1993 to 2000.

== See also ==
- List of Trinidadian representative cricketers
