= Eugene Antoine =

Trinidadian cricketer (born 1967)

Personal information
- Born: 8 April 1967 (age 59); Trinidad
- Source: Cricinfo, 26 November 2020

Eugene Antoine (born 8 April 1967) is a Trinidadian cricketer. He played in 25 first-class and 33 List A matches for Trinidad and Tobago from 1990 to 1997.

== See also ==
- List of Trinidadian representative cricketers
