= Kyron Lynch =

Trinidadian cricketer (born 1981)

Personal information
- Born: 8 August 1981 (age 45); Trinidad
- Source: Cricinfo, 28 November 2020

Kyron Lynch (born 8 August 1981) is a Trinidadian cricketer. He played in five first-class matches for Trinidad and Tobago in 2005.

== See also ==
- List of Trinidadian representative cricketers
