= John Green (Trinidadian cricketer) =

Trinidadian cricketer (born 1918)

Personal information
- Born: 10 March 1918; Trinidad
- Source: Cricinfo, 28 November 2020

John Green (born 10 March 1918, date of death unknown) was a Trinidadian cricketer. He played in two first-class matches for Trinidad and Tobago in 1935/36. Green is deceased.

== See also ==
- List of Trinidadian representative cricketers
