= Ashmead Jumadeen =

Trinidadian cricketer (born 1971)

Personal information
- Born: 25 October 1971 (age 55); Trinidad
- Source: Cricinfo, 28 November 2020

Ashmead Jumadeen (born 25 October 1971) is a Trinidadian cricketer. He played in one first-class match for Trinidad and Tobago in 1991/92.

== See also ==
- List of Trinidadian representative cricketers
