= Andre Lawrence =

Trinidadian cricketer (born 1969)

Personal information
- Born: 4 May 1969 (age 57); Trinidad
- Source: Cricinfo, 28 November 2020

Andre Lawrence (born 4 May 1969) is a Trinidadian cricketer. He played in six first-class and seventeen List A matches for Trinidad and Tobago from 1993 to 1999.

== See also ==
- List of Trinidadian representative cricketers
