= Nicholas Gomez =

Trinidadian cricketer (born 1964)

Personal information
- Born: 30 October 1964 (age 62); Trinidad
- Source: Cricinfo, 28 November 2020

Nicholas Gomez (born 30 October 1964) is a Trinidadian cricketer. He played in one first-class match for Trinidad and Tobago in 1985/86.

== See also ==
- List of Trinidadian representative cricketers
