= Samad Niamat =

Trinidadian cricketer

Personal information
- Born: 9 December 1912; Trinidad
- Died: 5 August 1984 (aged 71)
- Source: Cricinfo, 28 November 2020

Samad Niamat (9 December 1912 – 5 August 1984) was a Trinidadian cricketer. He played in one first-class match for Trinidad and Tobago in 1940/41.

== See also ==
- List of Trinidadian representative cricketers
