= Edgar de Gannes =

Trinidadian cricketer

Personal information
- Born: 2 March 1867; Trinidad
- Died: 18 July 1934 (aged 67); Trinidad
- Source: Cricinfo, 28 November 2020

Edgar de Gannes (2 March 1867 – 18 July 1934) was a Trinidadian cricketer. He played in three first-class matches for Trinidad and Tobago from 1891 to 1894.

== See also ==
- List of Trinidadian representative cricketers
