= Mario Belcon =

Trinidadian cricketer (born 1986)

Personal information
- Born: 2 November 1986 (age 40); Trinidad
- Source: Cricinfo, 27 November 2020

Mario Belcon (born 2 November 1986) is a Trinidadian cricketer. He played in three first-class and five List A matches for Trinidad and Tobago in 2006 and 2007.

== See also ==
- List of Trinidadian representative cricketers
