= Mikey Cipriani =

Trinidadian cricketer

Personal information
- Born: 1886; Trinidad
- Died: 1934 (aged 47–48); Trinidad and Tobago
- Source: Cricinfo, 28 November 2020

Mikey Cipriani (1886 – 1934) was a Trinidad and Tobago aviation pioneer, cyclist, footballer and cricketer. He played in two first-class matches for Trinidad and Tobago in 1911/12 and 1912/13.

Cipriani died in a plane crash in the Northern Range on 3 June 1934 on a flight from Mucurapo to Tobago. His body was found near Brasso Seco after eight days search.

== See also ==
- List of Trinidadian representative cricketers
