= Keith D'Heurieux =

Trinidadian cricketer (born 1952)

Personal information
- Born: 15 February 1952 (age 74); Trinidad
- Source: Cricinfo, 28 November 2020

Keith D'Heurieux (born 15 February 1952) is a Trinidadian cricketer. He played in 39 first-class and 16 List A matches for Trinidad and Tobago from 1971 to 1983.

== See also ==
- List of Trinidadian representative cricketers
