= Cecil Pouchet =

Trinidadian cricketer

Personal information
- Full name: Cecil Lewis Pouchet
- Born: Trinidad
- Died: 13 September 1963; Trinidad
- Batting: Right-handed
- Bowling: Slow left-arm orthodox
- Role: Bowler

Domestic team information
- Years: Team
- 1938-39 to 1948-49: Trinidad and Tobago

Career statistics
Competition	First-class
Matches	13
Runs scored	45
Batting average	4.09
100s/50s	0/0
Top score	11
Balls bowled	3030
Wickets	51
Bowling average	26.27
5 wickets in innings	4
10 wickets in match	0
Best bowling	8/120
Catches/stumpings	6/–
- Source: Cricinfo, 13 April 2022

Cecil Pouchet (died 13 September 1963) was a Trinidadian cricketer. He played in thirteen first-class matches for Trinidad and Tobago from 1938 to 1949.

== See also ==
- List of Trinidadian representative cricketers
