= Danraj Gopiesingh =

Trinidadian cricketer (born 1947)

Personal information
- Born: 13 February 1947 (age 79); Trinidad
- Source: Cricinfo, 28 November 2020

Danraj Gopiesingh (born 13 February 1947) is a Trinidadian cricketer. He played in nine first-class matches for Trinidad and Tobago in 1976/77 and 1977/78.

== See also ==
- List of Trinidadian representative cricketers
