= Randolph Glasgow =

Trinidadian cricketer (born 1962)

Personal information
- Born: 5 July 1962 (age 64); Trinidad
- Source: Cricinfo, 28 November 2020

Randolph Glasgow (born 5 July 1962) is a Trinidadian cricketer. He played in one List A and two first-class matches for Trinidad and Tobago in 1984/85.

== See also ==
- List of Trinidadian representative cricketers
