= Harry Ramoutar =

Trinidadian cricketer

Personal information
- Born: 4 November 1944; Trinidad
- Died: 5 May 1980 (aged 35); Trinidad
- Source: Cricinfo, 28 November 2020

Harry Ramoutar (4 November 1944 – 5 May 1980) was a Trinidadian cricketer. He played in 27 first-class matches for Trinidad and Tobago from 1960 to 1977.

== See also ==
- List of Trinidadian representative cricketers
