= Delbert Fitzpatrick =

Trinidadian cricketer (1919–?)

Personal information
- Born: 12 November 1919; Trinidad
- Died: unknown
- Source: Cricinfo, 28 November 2020

Delbert Fitzpatrick (born 12 November 1919, date of death unknown) was a Trinidadian cricketer. He played in two first-class matches for Trinidad and Tobago in 1943/44 and 1951/52.

== See also ==
- List of Trinidadian representative cricketers
