= Ruskin Mark =

Trinidadian cricketer (born 1957)

Personal information
- Born: 13 December 1957 (age 68); Trinidad
- Source: Cricinfo, 28 November 2020

Ruskin Mark (born 13 December 1957) is a Trinidadian cricketer. He played in eleven first-class matches for Trinidad and Tobago from 1975 to 1979.

== See also ==
- List of Trinidadian representative cricketers
