= Bernard McLeod =

Trinidadian cricketer (born 1953)

Personal information
- Born: 16 August 1953 (age 73); Trinidad
- Source: Cricinfo, 28 November 2020

Bernard McLeod (born 16 August 1953) is a Trinidadian cricketer. He played in 28 first-class matches for Trinidad and Tobago from 1971 to 1980.

== See also ==
- List of Trinidadian representative cricketers
