= Robert Mahabir =

Trinidadian cricketer (born 1966)

Personal information
- Born: 16 November 1966 (age 59); Trinidad
- Source: Cricinfo, 28 November 2020

Robert Mahabir (born 16 November 1966) is a Trinidadian cricketer. He played in five first-class and seven List A matches for Trinidad and Tobago from 1988 to 1995.

== See also ==
- List of Trinidadian representative cricketers
