= Syed Ali (cricketer) =

Trinidadian cricketer

Personal information
- Full name: Syed Mabarak Ali
- Born: 12 July 1913; Trinidad
- Died: 3 February 1993 (aged 79); Trinidad
- Source: Cricinfo, 26 November 2020

Syed Ali (12 July 1913 – 3 February 1993) was a Trinidadian cricketer. He played in five first-class matches for Trinidad and Tobago from 1940 to 1943. Primarily an off-spinner, he was no-balled for throwing on 29 occasions by umpire Eddie Ward during a match against Barbados in 1942, leading him to bowl underarm.

== See also ==
- List of Trinidadian representative cricketers
