= Sanjiv Gooljar =

Trinidadian cricketer (born 1982)

Personal information
- Born: 30 March 1982 (age 44); Trinidad
- Source: Cricinfo, 28 November 2020

Sanjiv Gooljar (born 30 March 1982) is a Trinidadian cricketer. He played in two first-class and five List A matches for Trinidad and Tobago from 2005 to 2007.

== See also ==
- List of Trinidadian representative cricketers
