= Sydney Jagbir =

Trinidadian cricketer

Personal information
- Born: 28 January 1913; Trinidad
- Died: 16 October 1986 (aged 73); Trinidad
- Source: Cricinfo, 28 November 2020

Sydney Jagbir (28 January 1913 – 16 October 1986) was a Trinidadian cricketer. He played in seven first-class matches for Trinidad and Tobago from 1934 to 1952.

== See also ==
- List of Trinidadian representative cricketers
