= Joseph Kelshall =

Trinidadian cricketer

Personal information
- Born: 22 June 1887; Nevis
- Died: 15 May 1966 (aged 78); Trinidad
- Source: Cricinfo, 28 November 2020

Joseph Kelshall (22 June 1887 – 15 May 1966) was a Trinidadian cricketer. He played in two first-class matches for Trinidad and Tobago in 1911/12 and 1919/20.

== See also ==
- List of Trinidadian representative cricketers
