= Desmond Baptiste =

Trinidadian cricketer (born 1949)

Personal information
- Born: 30 October 1949 (age 77); Trinidad
- Source: Cricinfo, 27 November 2020

Desmond Baptiste (born 30 October 1949) is a Trinidadian cricketer. He played in 21 first-class and 3 List A matches for Trinidad and Tobago from 1968 to 1978.

== See also ==
- List of Trinidadian representative cricketers
