= Richard Sieuchan =

Trinidadian cricketer (born 1961)

Personal information
- Born: 15 May 1961 (age 65); Trinidad
- Source: Cricinfo, 28 November 2020

Richard Sieuchan (born 15 May 1961) is a Trinidadian cricketer. He played in seven first-class and nine List A matches for Trinidad and Tobago from 1986 to 1991.

== See also ==
- List of Trinidadian representative cricketers
