= Mahadeo Bodoe =

Trinidadian cricketer (born 1966)

Personal information
- Born: 3 December 1966 (age 59); Trinidad
- Source: Cricinfo, 27 November 2020

Mahadeo Bodoe (born 3 December 1966) is a Trinidadian cricketer. He played in twenty first-class and four List A matches for Trinidad and Tobago from 1984 to 1997.

== See also ==
- List of Trinidadian representative cricketers
