= Theodore Modeste =

Trinidadian cricketer (born 1979)

Personal information
- Born: 4 July 1979 (age 47); Trinidad
- Source: Cricinfo, 28 November 2020

Theodore Modeste (born 4 July 1979) is a Trinidadian cricketer. He played in six first-class and four List A matches for Trinidad and Tobago from 2000 to 2007.

== See also ==
- List of Trinidadian representative cricketers
