= Joseph Lucas (cricketer) =

Trinidadian cricketer

Personal information
- Born: 1879; Trinidad
- Died: 16 September 1973 (aged 93–94); Trinidad
- Source: Cricinfo, 28 November 2020

Joseph Lucas (1879 – 16 September 1973) was a Trinidadian cricketer. He played in nine first-class matches for Trinidad and Tobago from 1898 to 1904.

== See also ==
- List of Trinidadian representative cricketers
