= Henry Warner (Trinidadian cricketer) =

Trinidadian cricketer

Personal information
- Born: 1854; Trinidad
- Died: 1929 (aged 74–75); Trinidad
- Source: Cricinfo, 28 November 2020

Henry Warner (1854 – 1929) was a Trinidadian cricketer. He played in one first-class match for Trinidad and Tobago in 1876/77.

== See also ==
- List of Trinidadian representative cricketers
