= Osmond Corbie =

Trinidadian cricketer

Personal information
- Born: 28 July 1934; Trinidad
- Died: 8 May 2003 (aged 68); Trinidad
- Source: Cricinfo, 28 November 2020

Osmond Corbie (28 July 1934 – 8 May 2003) was a Trinidadian cricketer. He played in ten first-class matches for Trinidad and Tobago from 1957 to 1962.

== See also ==
- List of Trinidadian representative cricketers
