= Dean St Hilaire =

Trinidadian cricketer (born 1963)

Personal information
- Born: 15 August 1963 (age 63); Trinidad
- Source: Cricinfo, 28 November 2020

Dean St Hilaire (born 15 August 1963) is a Trinidadian cricketer. He played in five first-class and two List A matches for Trinidad and Tobago from 1983 to 1989.

== See also ==
- List of Trinidadian representative cricketers
