= Joseph Agostini =

Trinidadian cricketer

Personal information
- Born: 1872; Trinidad
- Died: 1945 (aged 72–73); Trinidad
- Source: Cricinfo, 26 November 2020

Joseph Agostini (1872 – 1945) was a Trinidadian cricketer. He played in seven first-class matches for Trinidad and Tobago from 1891 to 1897.

== See also ==
- List of Trinidadian representative cricketers
