= Patrick Burke (cricketer) =

Trinidadian cricketer

Personal information
- Born: 14 February 1919; Trinidad
- Source: Cricinfo, 27 November 2020

Patrick Burke (born 14 February 1919, date of death unknown) was a Trinidadian cricketer. He played in one first-class match for Trinidad and Tobago in 1941/42.

== See also ==
- List of Trinidadian representative cricketers
