= Ananda Dwarika =

Trinidadian cricketer (born 1962)

Personal information
- Born: 17 December 1962 (age 63); Trinidad
- Source: Cricinfo, 28 November 2020

Ananda Dwarika (born 17 December 1962) is a Trinidadian cricketer. He played in three first-class matches for Trinidad and Tobago in 1987/88 and 1988/89.

== See also ==
- List of Trinidadian representative cricketers
