= Thornton Warner =

Trinidadian cricketer

Personal information
- Born: 1853; Trinidad
- Died: 1918 (aged 64–65); Trinidad
- Source: Cricinfo, 28 November 2020

Thornton Warner (1853–1918) was a Trinidadian cricketer. He played in five first-class matches for Trinidad and Tobago from 1876 to 1895.

== See also ==
- List of Trinidadian representative cricketers
