= Mukesh Persad =

Trinidadian cricketer (born 1970)

Personal information
- Born: 1 May 1970 (age 56); Trinidad
- Source: Cricinfo, 28 November 2020

Mukesh Persad (born 1 May 1970) is a Trinidadian cricketer. He played in forty first-class matches for Trinidad and Tobago from 1994 to 2003.

== See also ==
- List of Trinidadian representative cricketers
