= Navin Chan =

Trinidadian cricketer (born 1978)

Personal information
- Full name: Navin Indaraj Chan
- Born: 29 December 1978 (age 47); Trinidad
- Source: Cricinfo, 28 November 2020

Navin Indaraj Chan (born 29 December 1978) is a Trinidadian cricketer. He played in twelve first-class and two List A matches for Trinidad and Tobago from 1999 to 2003.

== See also ==
- List of Trinidadian representative cricketers
