= Arnold Oliver =

Trinidadian cricketer (born 1954)

Personal information
- Born: 17 December 1954 (age 71); Trinidad
- Source: Cricinfo, 28 November 2020

Arnold Oliver (born 17 December 1954) is a Trinidadian cricketer. He played in twenty first-class matches for Trinidad and Tobago from 1973 to 1974.

== See also ==
- List of Trinidadian representative cricketers
