= Abdul Razack (cricketer) =

Trinidadian cricketer

Personal information
- Born: 1888; Trinidad
- Died: July 1946 (aged 57–58)
- Source: Cricinfo, 28 November 2020

Abdul Razack (1888 – July 1946) was a Trinidadian cricketer. He played in one first-class match for Trinidad and Tobago in 1923/24.

== See also ==
- List of Trinidadian representative cricketers
