= Davindra Krishna =

Trinidadian cricketer (born 1981)

Personal information
- Born: 18 December 1981 (age 44); Trinidad
- Source: Cricinfo, 28 November 2020

Davindra Krishna (born 18 December 1981) is a Trinidadian cricketer. He played in three first-class matches for Trinidad and Tobago in 2004.

== See also ==
- List of Trinidadian representative cricketers
