= Nigel Francis =

Trinidadian cricketer (born 1971)

Personal information
- Born: 6 September 1971 (age 55); Trinidad
- Source: Cricinfo, 28 November 2020

Nigel Francis (born 6 September 1971) is a Trinidadian cricketer. He played in 29 first-class and 12 List A matches for Trinidad and Tobago from 1992 to 1998.

== See also ==
- List of Trinidadian representative cricketers
