= Mervyn Richardson =

Trinidadian cricketer (born 1962)

Personal information
- Born: 7 January 1962 (age 64); Trinidad
- Source: Cricinfo, 28 November 2020

Mervyn Richardson (born 7 January 1962) is a Trinidadian cricketer. He played in two first-class matches for Trinidad and Tobago in 1984/85 and 1985/86.

== See also ==
- List of Trinidadian representative cricketers
