= Kenneth Hazel =

Trinidadian cricketer (born 1971)

Personal information
- Born: 6 August 1971 (age 55); Trinidad
- Source: Cricinfo, 28 November 2020

Kenneth Hazel (born 6 August 1971) is a Trinidadian cricketer. He played in 3 first-class and 32 List A matches for Trinidad and Tobago from 1993 to 2001.

== See also ==
- List of Trinidadian representative cricketers
