= Sylvester Oliver =

Trinidadian cricketer

Personal information
- Born: 1929; Trinidad
- Died: February 1999 (aged 69–70); Trinidad
- Source: Cricinfo, 28 November 2020

Sylvester Oliver (1929 – February 1999) was a Trinidadian cricketer. He played in five first-class matches for Trinidad and Tobago from 1954 to 1958.

== See also ==
- List of Trinidadian representative cricketers
