= Ricky Jaipaul =

Trinidadian cricketer (born 1992)

Personal information
- Born: 3 March 1992 (age 34); Trinidad
- Source: Cricinfo, 28 November 2020

Ricky Jaipaul (born 3 March 1992) is a Trinidadian cricketer. He played in four first-class matches for Trinidad and Tobago from 2014 to 2017.

== See also ==
- List of Trinidadian representative cricketers
