= Atiba Allert =

Trinidadian cricketer (1981–2025)

Personal information
- Full name: Atiba Kerry Allert
- Born: 27 June 1981; McBean, Couva, Trinidad
- Died: 27 July 2025 (aged 44)
- Batting: Right-handed
- Bowling: Right-arm fast
- Role: Bowler

Domestic team information
- Years: Team
- 2008/09–2011/12: Trinidad and Tobago
- Source: Cricinfo, 26 November 2020

Atiba Kerry Allert (27 June 1981 – 27 July 2025) was a Trinidadian cricketer. A fast bowler, he played in nine first-class matches for Trinidad and Tobago from 2009 to 2012. His best bowling figures of 4/57 were taken against the Windward Islands on his first-class debut.

Allert died on 27 July 2025, at the age of 44. He had been ill for some time.

== See also ==
- List of Trinidadian representative cricketers
