= Ethelred Sorzano =

Trinidadian cricketer (born 1950)

Personal information
- Born: 23 June 1950 (age 76); Trinidad
- Source: Cricinfo, 28 November 2020

Ethelred Sorzano (born 23 June 1950) is a Trinidadian cricketer. He played in fourteen first-class matches for Trinidad and Tobago from 1974 to 1979.

== See also ==
- List of Trinidadian representative cricketers
