= Amarnath Basdeo =

Trinidadian cricketer (born 1977)

Personal information
- Born: 13 April 1977 (age 49); Trinidad
- Source: Cricinfo, 27 November 2020

Amarnath Basdeo (born 13 April 1977) is a Trinidadian cricketer. He played in two first-class matches for Trinidad and Tobago in 1996/97 and 1997/98.

== See also ==
- List of Trinidadian representative cricketers
