= Ramkaran Ramperass =

Trinidadian cricketer (born 1960)

Personal information
- Born: 12 February 1960 (age 66); Trinidad
- Source: Cricinfo, 28 November 2020

Ramkaran Ramperass (born 12 February 1960) is a Trinidadian cricketer. He played in two first-class and two List A matches for Trinidad and Tobago in 1981/82 and 1982/83.

== See also ==
- List of Trinidadian representative cricketers
