= Renwick Bishop =

Trinidadian cricketer (born 1965)

Personal information
- Born: 10 September 1965 (age 61); Trinidad
- Source: Cricinfo, 27 November 2020

Renwick Bishop (born 10 September 1965) is a Trinidadian cricketer. He played in eleven first-class and twenty-two List A matches for Trinidad and Tobago from 1986 to 1997.

== See also ==
- List of Trinidadian representative cricketers
