= Edgar Agostini =

Trinidadian cricketer

Personal information
- Full name: Louis Edgar Agostini
- Born: 1 January 1853
- Died: 7 August 1918 (aged 65)
- Source: Cricinfo, 26 November 2020

Edgar Agostini (1 January 1853 – 7 August 1918) was a Trinidadian cricketer. He played in two first-class matches for Trinidad and Tobago in 1876/77 and 1895/96.

== See also ==
- List of Trinidadian representative cricketers
