= Sudharma =

Daily newspaper published in Sanskrit

- Type: Daily newspaper
- Format: Broadsheet
- Editor: K.S.Jayalakshmi
- Founded: 15 July 1970; 55 years ago
- Language: Sanskrit
- Headquarters: Mysore, Karnataka
- Circulation: 5,000
- Website: sudharmasanskritdaily.in

Sudharma (Sanskrit: सुधर्मा) is the daily newspaper printed in Sanskrit in India. The paper is published from the city of Mysore in the Indian state of Karnataka. Established in 1970, the paper is mainly distributed via mail, a method that its founder resorted to when news vendors refused to stock his paper.

As of 2018, the newspaper was struggling to survive due to a paucity of funds.

== History ==
Sanskrit scholar Kalale Nadadur Varadaraja Iyengar launched the paper intending to propagate the language. He was also a publisher of Sanskrit books, and the Sanskrit movable types that were sometimes lying idle with him were another motivation for starting the newspaper. When discussing his publishing venture in public he was met with scorn from critics, who predicted the newspaper's failure. Many critics believed that the Sanskrit language had an insufficient vocabulary to cover contemporary day-to-day activities and developments. He was, however, supported in his venture by Agaram Rangaiah, who was an editor of a Kannada newspaper, and also by P. Nagachar, who was a former Joint Director of Information. Ignoring the skeptics, Varadaraja Iyengar published the first issue of Sudharma on July 14, 1970, from a location called 'Ganapathi Totti' in Maharaja's Sanskrit College. He was also instrumental in starting a Sanskrit news bulletin on All India Radio by convincing I. K. Gujral, the then Minister of Information and Broadcasting in the Government of India. Varadaraja Iyengar died in 1990. The paper is published out of a press in the Ramachandra Agrahara locality of Mysore.

== Circulation ==
The majority of subscribers are Sanskrit scholars and students. The paper has a daily circulation of about 3,500 copies, with an annual subscription fee of ₹600 ($8.09) for ordinary post and ₹1,200 ($16.18) for registered post. In addition to domestic circulation via post to academic institutions, public libraries, and to readers throughout India, the paper is also subscribed to by readers in countries like Japan and the United States of America at an annual overseas subscription fee of $20.

== Current scenario ==
Despite the lackluster financial performance of Sudharma, Sampath Kumar wants to continue publishing the newspaper, citing his passion for journalism and the Sanskrit language. He has had to struggle to keep the publication afloat. The paper has also helped its readers to learn and improve their knowledge of the language. On 15 July 2011, the 42nd anniversary of the paper's publication was celebrated in Mysore. A unique feature of the celebration was that all speeches were in Sanskrit, which is a rarity, and two Sanskrit scholars were honored on that occasion. This newspaper is available online as well.

The editor Sri K. V. Sampath Kumar and his wife Smt. Jayalakshmi KS was selected for the prestigious Padma Shri award for their contribution to journalism (under the category of Literature and Education) by the Government of India in 2020.

== ePaper and subscription ==
Sudharma was the first Sanskrit daily e-paper in the world. Additionally, its print edition features a Sanskrit crossword puzzle and similar novelties.
