= Kurban Razack =

Trinidadian cricketer

Personal information
- Born: 30 November 1912; Trinidad
- Died: 13 September 1992 (aged 79); Trinidad
- Source: Cricinfo, 28 November 2020

Kurban Razack (30 November 1912 – 13 September 1992) was a Trinidadian cricketer. He played in one first-class match for Trinidad and Tobago in 1934/35.

== See also ==
- List of Trinidadian representative cricketers
