= Shamshuddin Jumadeen =

Trinidadian cricketer (born 1959)

Personal information
- Born: 19 March 1959 (age 67); Trinidad
- Source: Cricinfo, 28 November 2020

Shamshuddin Jumadeen (born 19 March 1959) is a Trinidadian cricketer. He played in fourteen first-class and two List A matches for Trinidad and Tobago from 1976 to 1983.

== See also ==
- List of Trinidadian representative cricketers
