= Gregory Davis (cricketer) =

Trinidadian cricketer (born 1966)

Personal information
- Born: 2 August 1966 (age 60); Trinidad
- Source: Cricinfo, 28 November 2020

Gregory Davis (born 2 August 1966) is a Trinidadian cricketer. He played in one first-class match for Trinidad and Tobago in 1990/91.

== See also ==
- List of Trinidadian representative cricketers
