= David Mohammed =

Trinidadian cricketer (born 1965)

Personal information
- Born: 2 November 1965 (age 61); Trinidad
- Source: Cricinfo, 28 November 2020

David Mohammed (born 2 November 1965) is a Trinidadian cricketer. He played in nineteen first-class and seven List A matches for Trinidad and Tobago from 1984 to 1991.

== See also ==
- List of Trinidadian representative cricketers
