= Vishal Persad-Maharaj =

Trinidadian cricketer

Personal information
- Born: 16 May 1976 (age 50); Trinidad
- Source: Cricinfo, 28 November 2020

Vishal Persad-Maharaj (born 16 May 1976) is a Trinidadian cricketer. He played in one first-class match for Trinidad and Tobago in 1998/99.

== See also ==
- List of Trinidadian representative cricketers
