= Lennox Balgobin =

Trinidadian cricketer (born 1945)

Personal information
- Born: 1 December 1945 (age 80); Trinidad
- Source: Cricinfo, 27 November 2020

Lennox Balgobin (born 1 December 1945) is a Trinidadian cricketer. He played in five first-class matches for Trinidad and Tobago from 1967 to 1971.

== See also ==
- List of Trinidadian representative cricketers
