= Ferdinand de Gannes =

Trinidadian cricketer

Personal information
- Born: 31 January 1889; Trinidad
- Died: 22 March 1971 (aged 82); Trinidad
- Source: Cricinfo, 28 November 2020

Ferdinand de Gannes (31 January 1889 – 22 May 1971) was a Trinidadian cricketer. He played in fourteen first-class matches for Trinidad and Tobago from 1909 to 1923.

== See also ==
- List of Trinidadian representative cricketers
