= Andre Cipriani =

Trinidadian cricketer

Personal information
- Born: Trinidad
- Died: 18 January 1953
- Source: Cricinfo, 28 November 2020

Andre Cipriani (died 18 January 1953) was a Trinidadian cricketer. He played in twenty-three first-class matches for Trinidad and Tobago from 1908 to 1927.

== See also ==
- List of Trinidadian representative cricketers
