= Rajkumar Mahadeo =

Trinidadian cricketer (born 1970)

Personal information
- Born: 19 August 1970 (age 56); Trinidad
- Source: Cricinfo, 28 November 2020

Rajkumar Mahadeo (born 19 August 1970) is a Trinidadian cricketer. He played in one List A and three first-class matches for Trinidad and Tobago in 1991/92.

== See also ==
- List of Trinidadian representative cricketers
