= Colin Murray (cricketer) =

Trinidadian cricketer (born 1955)

Personal information
- Born: 26 December 1955 (age 70); Trinidad
- Source: Cricinfo, 28 November 2020

Colin Murray (born 26 December 1955) is a Trinidadian cricketer. He played in two first-class matches for Trinidad and Tobago in 1973/74 and 1980/81. He subsequently had a career as a cricket commentator and board member of the Queen's Park Cricket Club.

== See also ==
- List of Trinidadian representative cricketers
