= Arden Reid =

Trinidadian cricketer

Personal information
- Born: Dominica
- Died: 12 May 1888; Bradford, England
- Source: Cricinfo, 28 November 2020

Arden Reid (died 12 May 1988) was a Trinidadian cricketer. He played in three first-class matches for Trinidad and Tobago from 1955 to 1971.

== See also ==
- List of Trinidadian representative cricketers
