= Claude Phillip =

Trinidadian cricketer (born 1942)

Personal information
- Born: 10 November 1942 (age 84); Trinidad
- Source: Cricinfo, 28 November 2020

Claude Phillip (born 10 November 1942) is a Trinidadian cricketer. He played in twenty-three first-class matches for Trinidad and Tobago from 1969 to 1979.

== See also ==
- List of Trinidadian representative cricketers
