= Narine Bidhesi =

Trinidadian cricketer (born 1965)

Personal information
- Born: 5 April 1965 (age 61); Trinidad
- Source: Cricinfo, 27 November 2020

Narine Bidhesi (born 5 April 1965) is a Trinidadian cricketer. He played in eleven first-class and six List A matches for Trinidad and Tobago from 1989 to 1993.

== See also ==
- List of Trinidadian representative cricketers
