= Noble Sarkar =

Trinidadian cricketer (1922–2006)

Personal information
- Born: 23 January 1922; Trinidad
- Died: 8 December 2006 (aged 84); Trinidad
- Source: Cricinfo, 28 November 2020

Noble Sarkar (23 January 1922 – 8 December 2006) was a Trinidadian cricketer. He played in one first-class match for Trinidad and Tobago in 1942/43.

== See also ==
- List of Trinidadian representative cricketers
