= Ivan Ashtine =

Trinidadian cricketer

Personal information
- Born: 28 September 1924; Trinidad
- Died: 16 November 1985 (aged 61); Trinidad
- Source: Cricinfo, 26 November 2020

Ivan Ashtine (28 September 1924 – 16 November 1985) was a Trinidadian cricketer. He played in two first-class matches for Trinidad and Tobago in 1943/44.

== See also ==
- List of Trinidadian representative cricketers
