= Garnet Gilman =

Trinidadian cricketer (born 1964)

Personal information
- Born: 29 September 1964 (age 62); Trinidad
- Source: Cricinfo, 28 November 2020

Garnet Gilman (born 29 September 1964) is a Trinidadian cricketer. He played in one first-class and two List A matches for Trinidad and Tobago from 1985 to 1988.

== See also ==
- List of Trinidadian representative cricketers
