= Nicholas Ramjass =

Trinidadian cricketer (born 1982)

Personal information
- Born: 2 November 1982 (age 44); Trinidad
- Batting: Left-handed
- Bowling: Slow left-arm
- Role: All-rounder
- Source: Cricinfo, 28 November 2020

Nicholas Ramjass (born 2 November 1982) is a Trinidadian cricketer. He played in five Twenty20 matches for Trinidad and Tobago in 2006.

== See also ==
- List of Trinidadian representative cricketers
