= Ernest Plummer =

Trinidadian cricketer

Personal information
- Born: 31 May 1872; Trinidad
- Source: Cricinfo, 28 November 2020

Ernest Plummer (born 31 May 1872) was a Trinidadian cricketer. He played in two first-class matches for Trinidad and Tobago in 1895/96 and 1896/97.

== See also ==
- List of Trinidadian representative cricketers
