= Teshwan Castro =

Trinidadian cricketer (born 1992)

Personal information
- Born: 29 February 1992 (age 34); Trinidad
- Source: Cricinfo, 28 November 2020

Teshwan Castro (born 29 February 1992) is a Trinidadian cricketer. He played in one first-class match for Trinidad and Tobago in 2012.

== See also ==
- List of Trinidadian representative cricketers
