= Dudnath Ramkissoon =

Trinidadian cricketer (born 1951)

Personal information
- Born: 13 October 1951 (age 75); Trinidad
- Source: Cricinfo, 28 November 2020

Dudnath Ramkissoon (born 13 October 1951) is a Trinidadian cricketer. He played in 32 first-class and 6 List A matches for Trinidad and Tobago from 1969 to 1979. He was also the first captain of the West Indies under-19 cricket team.

== See also ==
- List of Trinidadian representative cricketers
