= Jason Bennett (cricketer) =

West Indian cricketer (born 1982)

Jason Peterson Bennett
Personal information
- Born: 8 October 1982 (age 44); Mount Standfast, Saint James, Barbados
- Batting: Right-handed
- Bowling: Right-arm fast-medium
- Role: Bowler

Domestic team information
- Years: Team
- 2004/05–2006/07: Barbados
- 2007/08–2009/10: Combined Campuses and Colleges

Career statistics
Competition	First-class	List A
Matches	27	8
Runs scored	270	16
Batting average	7.29	4.00
100s/50s	0/0	0/0
Top score	39	9
Balls bowled	4,306	397
Wickets	106	12
Bowling average	21.41	28.66
5 wickets in innings	9	0
10 wickets in match	2	0
Best bowling	6/46	3/44
Catches/stumpings	4/–	0/–
- Source: CricketArchive, 25 May 2023

Jason Peterson Bennett (born 8 October 1982) is a West Indian first-class cricketer, who took 106 wickets in his first class career. As a cricketer Bennett featured, as a right-arm fast-medium pace bowler for Barbados, Combined Campuses and Colleges together with West Indies B.
