= Alfred Arrowsmith =

Trinidadian cricketer (died 1935)

Personal information
- Born: Trinidad
- Died: 14 March 1935; Brooklyn, New York, United States
- Source: Cricinfo, 26 November 2020

Alfred Arrowsmith (died 14 March 1935) was a Trinidadian cricketer. He played in two first-class matches for Trinidad and Tobago in 1907/08.

== See also ==
- List of Trinidadian representative cricketers
