= Horace Deighton =

Trinidadian cricketer

Personal information
- Born: 20 September 1831; Cambridge, England
- Source: Cricinfo, 28 November 2020

Horace Deighton (born 20 September 1831 – date of death unknown) was a Trinidadian cricketer. He played in two first-class matches for Trinidad and Tobago in 1868/69.

== See also ==
- List of Trinidadian representative cricketers
