= Premnath Ramnath =

Trinidadian cricketer (born 1962)

Personal information
- Born: 7 April 1962 (age 64); Trinidad
- Source: Cricinfo, 28 November 2020

Premnath Ramnath (born 7 April 1962) is a Trinidadian cricketer. He played in four first-class matches for Trinidad and Tobago from 1981 to 1984.

== See also ==
- List of Trinidadian representative cricketers
