= Oliver Bennett (cricketer) =

Trinidadian cricketer

Personal information
- Born: 9 March 1889; Trinidad
- Died: 30 October 1977 (aged 88); Trinidad
- Source: Cricinfo, 27 November 2020

Oliver Bennett (9 March 1889 – 30 November 1977) was a Trinidadian cricketer. He played in eight first-class matches for Trinidad and Tobago from 1907 to 1911.

== See also ==
- List of Trinidadian representative cricketers
