= Kenny Williams =

Kenny Williams may refer to:

- Kenny Williams (announcer) (1914–1984), American television announcer
- Kenny J. Williams (1927–2003), American author and English professor
- Kenny Williams (bowls) (died 2012), Australian lawn and indoor bowler
- Kenny Williams (baseball) (born 1964), American baseball player and Chicago White Sox executive vice president
- Kenny Williams (cyclist) (born 1967), American racing cyclist
- Kenny Williams (basketball, born 1969), American basketball player for the Indiana Pacers
- Kenny Williams (basketball, born 1972), American basketball player for UIC Flames
- Kenny Williams (wrestler) (born 1988), Scottish professional wrestler
- Kenny Williams (basketball, born 1996), American basketball player for the North Carolina Tar Heels
- Kenny Bruce Williams, fictional character in the novel series Left Behind

== See also ==
- Ken Williams (disambiguation)
