= Harold Burnett =

Trinidadian cricketer

Personal information
- Born: 23 June 1915; Trinidad
- Died: 18 December 1981 (aged 66); Trinidad
- Source: Cricinfo, 27 November 2020

Harold Burnett (23 June 1915 – 18 December 1981) was a Trinidadian cricketer. He played in eleven first-class matches for Trinidad and Tobago from 1942 to 1947.

== See also ==
- List of Trinidadian representative cricketers
