= Jerry Jumadeen =

Trinidadian cricketer (born 1978)

Personal information
- Born: 28 February 1978 (age 48); Trinidad
- Source: Cricinfo, 28 November 2020

Jerry Jumadeen (born 28 February 1978) is a Trinidadian cricketer. He played in one first-class match for Trinidad and Tobago in 1999/00.

== See also ==
- List of Trinidadian representative cricketers
