= Donald Eligon =

Trinidadian cricketer

Personal information
- Born: 1909; Trinidad
- Died: 4 June 1937 (aged 27–28); Trinidad
- Source: Cricinfo, 28 November 2020

Donald Eligon (1909 – 4 June 1937) was a Trinidadian cricketer. He played in four first-class matches for Trinidad and Tobago from 1933 to 1937. He died from blood poisoning that started from a nail in his boot.

== See also ==
- List of Trinidadian representative cricketers
