= Jonathan Augustus =

Trinidadian cricketer (born 1985)

Personal information
- Born: 17 April 1985 (age 41); Canada
- Source: Cricinfo, 26 November 2020

Jonathan Augustus (born 17 April 1985) is a Trinidadian cricketer. He played in three first-class and four List A matches for Trinidad and Tobago from 2003 to 2014.

== See also ==
- List of Trinidadian representative cricketers
