= Zaheer Ali =

Trinidadian cricketer (born 1981)

Personal information
- Full name: Zaheer Reaz Ali
- Born: 17 January 1981 (age 45); Bamboo Village, Trinidad
- Batting: Left-handed
- Bowling: Left-arm medium

Domestic team information
- Years: Team
- 2000–2003: Trinidad and Tobago
- 2001: West Indies B
- Source: CricketArchive, 27 December 2015

Zaheer Reaz Ali (born 17 January 1981) is a former Trinidadian cricketer who represented Trinidad and Tobago in West Indian domestic cricket. He played as a left-handed middle-order batsman.

Ali represented the West Indies under-19s at the 2000 Under-19 World Cup in Sri Lanka. He played in three of his team's matches, scoring 31 against the combined Americas under-19 team, 27 against Australia, and a golden duck against New Zealand. After the World Cup, Ali made his first-class debut in April 2000, playing for a West Indies Select XI against the touring Zimbabweans. His limited-overs debut came later in the year, when he featured twice for Trinidad and Tobago in the 2000–01 Red Stripe Bowl. During the 2000–01 Busta Cup, Ali made five appearances for West Indies B (a development team), although he had little success. His first-class debut for Trinidad and Tobago came the following season. He played his last top-level matches during the 2002–03 Carib Beer Cup, scoring his only first-class half-century (52 against Barbados) in his first match of the season.
