= Donald McLeod (Trinidadian cricketer) =

Trinidadian cricketer (born 1963)

Personal information
- Born: 13 January 1963 (age 63); Trinidad
- Source: Cricinfo, 28 November 2020

Donald McLeod (born 13 January 1963) is a Trinidadian cricketer. He played in two first-class matches for Trinidad and Tobago in 1982/83 and 1989/90.

== See also ==
- List of Trinidadian representative cricketers
