= Giles Antoine =

Trinidadian cricketer (born 1958)

Personal information
- Born: 24 May 1958 (age 68); Trinidad
- Source: Cricinfo, 26 November 2020

Giles Antoine (born 24 May 1958) is a Trinidadian cricketer. He played in eleven first-class and five List A matches for Trinidad and Tobago from 1982 to 1986.

== See also ==
- List of Trinidadian representative cricketers
