= Avidesh Samaroo =

Trinidadian cricketer (born 1978)

Personal information
- Born: 22 January 1978 (age 48); Trinidad
- Source: Cricinfo, 28 November 2020

Avidesh Samaroo (born 22 January 1978) is a Trinidadian cricketer. He played in twelve first-class matches for Trinidad and Tobago from 1995 to 2000.

== See also ==
- List of Trinidadian representative cricketers
