= Balkaram Sagram =

Trinidadian cricketer (born 1950)

Personal information
- Born: 2 January 1950 (age 76); Trinidad
- Source: Cricinfo, 28 November 2020

Balkaram Sagram (born 2 January 1950) is a Trinidadian cricketer. He played in 32 first-class matches for Trinidad and Tobago from 1971 to 1983.

== See also ==
- List of Trinidadian representative cricketers
