= Emile Rajah =

Trinidadian cricketer (born 1987)

Personal information
- Born: 3 October 1987 (age 39); Trinidad
- Source: Cricinfo, 28 November 2020

Emile Rajah (born 3 October 1987) is a Trinidadian cricketer. He played in one first-class match for Trinidad and Tobago in 2012.

== See also ==
- List of Trinidadian representative cricketers
