= Oliver Demming =

Trinidadian cricketer

Personal information
- Born: 18 April 1928; Trinidad
- Died: August 1999; Trinidad
- Source: Cricinfo, 28 November 2020

Oliver Demming (18 April 1928 – August 1999) was a Trinidadian cricketer. He played in four first-class matches for Trinidad and Tobago from 1951 to 1954.

== See also ==
- List of Trinidadian representative cricketers
