= Lionel Christiani =

Trinidadian cricketer

Personal information
- Born: 1904; Trinidad
- Source: Cricinfo, 28 November 2020

Lionel Christiani (born 1904, date of death unknown) was a Trinidadian cricketer. He played in two first-class matches for Trinidad and Tobago in 1929/30.

== See also ==
- List of Trinidadian representative cricketers
