= Selwyn Caesar =

Trinidadian cricketer

Personal information
- Born: 16 May 1936 (age 90); Trinidad
- Source: Cricinfo, 28 November 2020

Selwyn Caesar (born 16 May 1936) is a Trinidadian cricketer. He played in ten first-class matches for Trinidad and Tobago from 1959 to 1964.

== See also ==
- List of Trinidadian representative cricketers
