= Wilfred Debissette =

Trinidadian cricketer (born 1961)

Personal information
- Born: 16 July 1961 (age 65); Trinidad
- Source: Cricinfo, 28 November 2020

Wilfred Debissette (born 16 July 1961) is a Trinidadian cricketer. He played in five first-class and three List A matches for Trinidad and Tobago from 1982 to 1985.

== See also ==
- List of Trinidadian representative cricketers
