= Gerald Liddlelow =

Trinidadian cricketer

Personal information
- Born: Trinidad
- Died: 15 February 1983; Trinidad
- Source: Cricinfo, 28 November 2020

Gerald Liddlelow (died 15 February 1983) was a Trinidadian cricketer. He played in three first-class matches for Trinidad and Tobago from 1910 to 1929.

== See also ==
- List of Trinidadian representative cricketers
