= Vernon Sadahpal =

Trinidadian cricketer (born 1947)

Personal information
- Born: 17 July 1947 (age 79); Trinidad
- Source: Cricinfo, 28 November 2020

Vernon Sadahpal (born 17 July 1947) is a Trinidadian cricketer. He played in seven first-class matches for Trinidad and Tobago from 1968 to 1976.

== See also ==
- List of Trinidadian representative cricketers
