= Marcus Minshall =

Trinidadian cricketer

Personal information
- Died: 1970; Trinidad
- Source: Cricinfo, 28 November 2020

Marcus Minshall (died 1970) was a Trinidadian cricketer. He played in nine first-class matches for Trinidad and Tobago from 1958 to 1963.

== See also ==
- List of Trinidadian representative cricketers
