= Ronald Outridge =

Trinidadian cricketer

Personal information
- Born: 23 November 1935 (age 90); British Guiana
- Source: Cricinfo, 28 November 2020

Ronald Outridge (born 23 November 1935) is a Trinidadian cricketer. He played in one first-class match for Trinidad and Tobago in 1956/57.

== See also ==
- List of Trinidadian representative cricketers
