= Gopaul Sahadeo =

Trinidadian cricketer (born 1952)

Personal information
- Born: 18 March 1952 (age 74); Trinidad
- Source: Cricinfo, 28 November 2020

Gopaul Sahadeo (born 18 March 1952) is a Trinidadian cricketer. He played in two first-class matches for Trinidad and Tobago in 1973/74 and 1976/77.

== See also ==
- List of Trinidadian representative cricketers
