= Rajindra Mangallie =

Trinidadian cricketer (born 1965)

Personal information
- Born: 13 August 1965 (age 61); Trinidad
- Source: Cricinfo, 28 November 2020

Rajindra Mangallie (born 13 August 1965) is a Trinidadian cricketer. He played in one first-class and six List A matches for Trinidad and Tobago from 1992 to 1995.

== See also ==
- List of Trinidadian representative cricketers
