= Deryck Murray =

West Indies cricketer (born 1943)

Personal information
- Full name: Deryck Lance Murray
- Born: 20 May 1943 (age 83); Port of Spain, Trinidad and Tobago
- Batting: Right-handed
- Bowling: Leg break
- Role: Wicket-keeper
- Relatives: Lance Murray (father)

International information
- National side: West Indies
- Test debut: 6 June 1963 v England
- Last Test: 7 August 1980 v England
- ODI debut: 5 September 1973 v England
- Last ODI: 28 May 1980 v England

Domestic team information
- Years: Team
- 1960–1981: Trinidad and Tobago
- 1965–1966: Cambridge University
- 1966–1969: Nottinghamshire
- 1972–1975: Warwickshire

Career statistics
Competition	Test	ODI	FC	LA
Matches	62	26	367	144
Runs scored	1,993	294	13,292	1,938
Batting average	22.90	24.50	28.28	23.63
100s/50s	0/11	0/2	10/72	0/7
Top score	91	61*	166*	82
Balls bowled	0	0	500	0
Wickets	–	–	5	–
Bowling average	–	–	73.40	–
5 wickets in innings	–	–	0	–
10 wickets in match	–	–	0	–
Best bowling	–	–	2/50	–
Catches/stumpings	181/8	37/1	740/108	164/14
Medal record
Men's Cricket
Representing West Indies
ICC Cricket World Cup
Winner	1975 England
Winner	1979 England
- Source: CricketArchive, 17 October 2010

Deryck Lance Murray (born 20 May 1943) is a former West Indies cricketer. A wicketkeeper and right-handed batsman, Murray kept wicket to the West Indian fast bowling attacks of the 1970s (including Andy Roberts, Michael Holding, Joel Garner and Colin Croft); his glovework effected 189 Test dismissals and greatly enhanced the potency of the bowling attack.

Murray captained Trinidad and Tobago 1976–1981, and was vice-captain of the sides which won the 1975 World Cup and the 1979 World Cup. He deputised for Clive Lloyd as West Indies captain in one Test match in 1979.

== Early and personal life ==
Murray was born in Port of Spain, Trinidad and Tobago, and educated at Queen's Royal College; he first played for Trinidad and Tobago national cricket team while still at school. He went on to study economics at Jesus College, Cambridge, earning his Cambridge blue and captaining Cambridge University Cricket Club in 1966. That same year, he was sent down from Cambridge after failing his Part I tripos examinations in both economics and history; the news made the front page of The Times. He later studied Industrial Economics at the University of Nottingham. Murray married Maureen in 1967; he has two sons and a grandson.

== Cricket career ==
In his career, Murray played as a wicketkeeper for the national Trinidad and Tobago team as well as playing 62 Tests for the West Indies. He was first selected for the West Indies as a 20-year-old, under the captaincy of Frank Worrell; in his maiden series in 1963 he effected a record 24 dismissals. Though he never scored a Test century, Murray's right-handed batting in the middle order could be effective. During his highest Test score of 91, against India in 1975, he shared a partnership worth 250 runs with Clive Lloyd (who scored 242 not out).

Probably Murray's most famous performance came in a match in the 1975 Cricket World Cup against Pakistan when he inspired the West Indies to an unlikely and important one-wicket victory with his highest one-day international score of 61 not out, sharing in an unbroken last-wicket stand of 64 with Andy Roberts. The West Indies went onto win the final, Murray clinching victory with the run out of Jeff Thomson. Murray also played in the West Indies victory in the final of the second world cup in 1979.

Murray captained the West Indies in one Test against Australia in 1979, and in two one-day internationals.

Murray played in the English County Championship for Nottinghamshire and Warwickshire.

== Later career ==
Murray served as a diplomat in the Foreign Service of Trinidad and Tobago 1978–1989, becoming a representative to the United Nations in New York, where he served as vice-chairman of the Fifth Committee and Chairman of the Committee for Programme & Coordination. He also worked in the financial services industry. Murray officiated as match referee for three One Day Internationals in 1992. He has also served as President of the Trinidad and Tobago Cricket Board. Murray is also Chairman of the Trinidad and Tobago Transparency Institute, the local branch of the anti-corruption organisation Transparency International.

In September 2019 he was appointed Trinidad and Tobago's High Commissioner to Jamaica.

Preceded by Alvin Kallicharran	West Indies Test cricket captains 1979/80	Succeeded by Viv Richards
