= Kenrick Bainey =

Trinidadian cricketer (born 1955)

Personal information
- Born: 16 November 1955 (age 70); Trinidad
- Source: Cricinfo, 27 November 2020

Kenrick Bainey (born 16 November 1955) is a Trinidadian cricketer. He played in 35 first-class and 5 List A matches for Trinidad and Tobago from 1974 to 1985.

== See also ==
- List of Trinidadian representative cricketers
