= Aneil Rajah =

Trinidadian cricketer (born 1955)

Personal information
- Born: 30 July 1955 (age 71); Trinidad
- Source: Cricinfo, 28 November 2020

Aneil Rajah (born 30 July 1955) is a Trinidadian cricketer. He played in 56 first-class and 17 List A matches for Trinidad and Tobago from 1974 to 1988.

== See also ==
- List of Trinidadian representative cricketers
