= Denzil James =

Trinidadian cricketer (born 1982)

Personal information
- Born: 12 December 1982 (age 43); Trinidad
- Source: Cricinfo, 28 November 2020

Denzil James (born 12 December 1982) is a Trinidadian cricketer. He played in eight first-class matches for Trinidad and Tobago in 2001/02 and 2002/03.

== See also ==
- List of Trinidadian representative cricketers
