= 2000–01 Busta Cup =

Cricket tournament

- Dates: 4 January – 19 February 2001
- Administrator: WICB
- Cricket format: First-class (four-day)
- Tournament format: Round-robin
- Champions: Barbados (17th title)
- Participants: 8
- Matches: 28
- Most runs: (Guyana) Carl Hooper (798)
- Most wickets: (Trinidad and Tobago) Dinanath Ramnarine (41)

The 2000–01 Busta Cup was the 35th edition of what is now the Regional Four Day Competition, the domestic first-class cricket competition for the countries of the West Indies Cricket Board (WICB). It was played from 4 January to 19 February 2001.

Eight teams contested the competition, which was played as a round-robin. The six regular teams of West Indian domestic cricket (Barbados, Guyana, Jamaica, the Leeward Islands, Trinidad and Tobago, and the Windward Islands) were joined by a development team (West Indies B) and an invited overseas team (England A). Barbados and Guyana finished equal on points, but Barbados topped the table by winning more matches, claiming a 17th domestic first-class title. The Busta Cup was followed by a brief knockout competition called the Busta International Shield. It was played from 23 February to 5 March, featuring the top four teams from the Busta Cup, and was won by Jamaica.

Both the Busta Cup and the Busta International Shield were sponsored by S. M. Jaleel and Company, the manufacturers of the Busta soft drink brand. The tournament featured the largest amount of prize money ever offered for a West Indian regional competition. The overall winners of the Busta Cup and Busta International Shield won US$7,000 and $10,000, respectively, while teams playing England A could win $7,500 for a first innings lead and $15,000 for an outright win. Additionally, $50,000 was on offer to any player who either scored 1,000 runs or took 65 wickets, although that prize was unclaimed.

== Points table ==
Team	Pld	W	L	LWF	DWF	DLF	Pts
Barbados	7	4	0	0	0	3	57
Guyana	7	3	0	0	3	1	57
England A	7	3	0	0	2	2	54
Jamaica	7	3	1	0	2	1	51
Leeward Islands	7	3	1	0	1	2	48
Trinidad and Tobago	7	2	2	2	1	0	38
(Cricket West Indies) West Indies B	7	1	4	2	0	0	20
Windward Islands	7	0	7	0	0	0	0
Source: CricketArchive

Key

- W – Outright win (12 points)
- L – Outright loss (0 points)
- LWF – Lost match, but won first innings (4 points)
- DWF – Drawn, but won first innings (6 points)
- DLF – Drawn, but lost first innings (3 points)
- Pts – Total points

== Statistics ==
=== Most runs ===
The top five run-scorers are included in this table, listed by runs scored and then by batting average.

Player	Team	Runs	Inns	Avg	Highest	100s	50s
Carl Hooper	Guyana	798	10	99.75	159	4	2
Chris Gayle	Jamaica	721	13	65.54	208*	2	3
Ian Ward	England A	689	12	68.90	135	3	3
Leon Garrick	Jamaica	592	13	49.33	200*	1	4
Stuart Williams	Leeward Islands	522	9	58.00	160	2	1

=== Most wickets ===
The top five wicket-takers are listed in this table, listed by wickets taken and then by bowling average.

Player	Team	Overs	Wkts	Ave	5	10	BBI
Dinanath Ramnarine	Trinidad and Tobago	365.0	41	18.58	5	1	6/54
Neil McGarrell	Guyana	374.2	30	26.03	1	0	5/82
Kevin Darlington	Guyana	183.4	26	19.11	2	0	6/25
Kerry Jeremy	Leeward Islands	210.0	26	20.69	1	0	6/46
Ricky Christopher	Leeward Islands	213.5	26	22.00	2	0	5/32

== See also ==
- 2000–01 Red Stripe Bowl
