= Ken Miller (television producer) =

American television producer

Kenneth Miller is an American television producer.

== Early life ==
Growing up in the studios, Miller always aspired to work in the film and music industry.

== Career ==
Miller is best known for his career as a television executive. He started his career as a film editor elected into ACE at a young age and was also a writer brought to the attention of the iconic Producer Aaron Spelling. Miller worked closely with Spelling and became a Producer in the company as well as Senior Vice President of Spelling Television. He's been integral to over 1,200 hours of prime time television. After 27 years of working closely with Aaron Spelling, Spelling Television was purchased by CBS, and operations were discontinued.

During his time with Spelling, Miller was instrumental in the success of some of television's longest running series such as Dynasty, Love Boat, Melrose Place, Beverly Hills 90210, 7th Heaven and Charmed. Miller also executive produced 11 soundtrack albums, several of which were certified gold and platinum by the RIAA.

== Filmography ==
=== Television ===
Year	Film	Role	Notes
2000	Beverly Hills, 90210	Producer	
1989	Dynasty		
2006	Charmed		
2006	Summerland		
2001	Titans		
2001	All Souls		
2000	Satan's School for Girls		
2000	Safe Harbor		
1999	Rescue 77		
1999	Buddy Faro		
1999	Love Boat: The Next Wave		
1998	Melrose Place		
1997	After Jimmy		
1997	Pacific Palisades		
1996	Pier 66		
1996	Season in Purgatory		
1996	Savannah		
1996	Malibu Shores		
1996	Kindred: The Embraced		
1996	Robin's Hoods		
1995	James A. Michener's Texas	Executive in Charge	
1995	Heaven Help Us	Executive in Charge	
1995	Models Inc.		
1995	Madman of the People		
1995	Burke's Law		
1994	Jane's House		
