= David Audain =

Trinidadian cricketer (born 1956)

Personal information
- Born: 21 October 1956 (age 70); Trinidad
- Source: Cricinfo, 26 November 2020

David Audain (born 21 October 1956) is a Trinidadian cricketer. He played in fourteen first-class and eight List A matches for Trinidad and Tobago from 1977 to 1983.

== See also ==
- List of Trinidadian representative cricketers
