= Ronald Boyack =

Trinidadian cricketer (1906–1988)

Personal information
- Born: 1906; Trinidad
- Died: 11 December 1988 (aged 81–82); Seattle, Washington, United States
- Source: Cricinfo, 27 November 2020

Ronald Boyack (1906 – 11 December 1988) was a Trinidadian cricketer. He played in two first-class matches for Trinidad and Tobago in 1924–25.

== See also ==
- List of Trinidadian representative cricketers
