= Kenneth Williams (Trinidadian cricketer) =

Trinidadian cricketer (born 1968)

Personal information
- Born: 27 January 1968 (age 58); Trinidad
- Source: Cricinfo, 28 November 2020

Kenneth Williams (born 27 January 1968) is a Trinidadian cricketer. He played in 24 first-class and 17 List A matches for Trinidad and Tobago from 1983 to 1984.

== See also ==
- List of Trinidadian representative cricketers
