= Aneil Nambiar =

Indian cricketer (born 1984)

Personal information
- Full name: Aneil Padman Nambiar
- Born: 2 March 1984 (age 42); Trivandrum, Kerala, India
- Batting: Right-handed
- Bowling: Right-arm medium

Domestic team information
- Years: Team
- 2003: Oxfordshire

Career statistics
Competition	List A
Matches	1
Runs scored	0
Batting average	0.00
100s/50s	–/–
Top score	0
Balls bowled	–
Wickets	–
Bowling average	–
5 wickets in innings	–
10 wickets in match	–
Best bowling	–
Catches/stumpings	–/–
- Source: ESPNcricinfo, 19 April 2012

Aneil Padman Nambiar (born 2 March 1984) is a former Indian cricketer. Nambiar is a right-handed batsman who bowls right-arm medium pace. He was born at Trivandrum, Kerala, and is more commonly known by his nickname Johnny Nambiar.

While in India, Nambiar represented Karnataka Under-16s in the 1999/00 season. Nambiar later moved to England, where he represented Oxfordshire in a single List A match against Herefordshire at Banbury Cricket Club Ground in the 1st round of the 2004 Cheltenham & Gloucester Trophy, which was played later in the 2003 season to avoid fixture congestion in 2004. Opening the batting, he was dismissed for a duck by Franklyn Rose. Oxfordshire lost the match by 126 runs. This was his only appearance for the county, with Nambiar not featuring in any Minor counties cricket for Oxfordshire.

He would later briefly play Second XI cricket for Middlesex in 2004 and 2005.
