= Kenneth Miller (cricketer) =

Trinidadian cricketer (born 1958)

Personal information
- Born: 21 May 1958 (age 68); Trinidad
- Source: Cricinfo, 28 November 2020

Kenneth Miller (born 21 May 1958) is a Trinidadian cricketer. He played in one List A and five first-class matches for Trinidad and Tobago from 1978 to 1982.

== See also ==
- List of Trinidadian representative cricketers
