= Gregory Mahabir =

Trinidadian cricketer (born 1981)

Personal information
- Born: 18 January 1981 (age 45); Trinidad
- Source: Cricinfo, 28 November 2020

Gregory Mahabir (born 18 January 1981) is a Trinidadian cricketer. He played in nineteen first-class and eleven List A matches for Trinidad and Tobago from 2000 to 2006.

== See also ==
- List of Trinidadian representative cricketers
