= Ken Williams (footballer, born 1927) =

English footballer (born 1927)

Personal information
- Full name: Kenneth Williams
- Date of birth: 7 January 1927
- Place of birth: Doncaster, West Riding of Yorkshire, England
- Height: 5 ft 10 in (1.78 m)
- Position: Wing-half

Senior career*
Years	Team	Apps	(Gls)
1948–1951	Rotherham United	0	(0)
1951–1954	York City	1	(0)
Total		7	(0)
- * Club domestic league appearances and goals

Kenneth Williams (born 7 January 1927) is an English former professional footballer who played as a wing-half in the Football League for York City, and was on the books of Rotherham United without making a league appearance.
