= Noel Robinson (cricketer) =

Trinidadian cricketer (born 1941)

Personal information
- Born: 23 December 1941 (age 84); Trinidad
- Source: Cricinfo, 28 November 2020

Noel Robinson (born 23 December 1941) is a Trinidadian cricketer. He played in six first-class matches for Trinidad and Tobago from 1961 to 1977.

== See also ==
- List of Trinidadian representative cricketers
