= Ken Miller (curator) =

American curator, writer and editor

- Occupations: Curator and editor

Ken Miller is a curator, writer and editor. He has presented exhibitions in the United States, Europe and Asia, often with private sponsorship. He has published several books of art, fashion and photography and initiated a recurring multimedia feature for T: The New York Times Style Magazine. In 2025, he was named one of "The 100 Most Influential People in the Photography Industry" by Blind Magazine.

== Curator ==
City of Tomorrow, a symposium presented by Ford, featured large-scale photographs commissioned by Miller. In 2016, Miller curated murals, sculptures, installations and other visual art for Clarify, an 8 city program presented by music streaming service Spotify; artists presented in Clarify included Saya Woolfalk, For Freedoms, Nina Chanel Abney, among others. In 2015, Miller curated fashion photography for "Artists Series" at Gana Art in Seoul, Korea. In 2014, Miller curated two exhibitions at the Sundance Film Festival. 1MSQFT showcased music and design as part of a cultural programming series for Microsoft. SPACE, with sponsorship by Patagonia, presented landscapes by prominent fine art and fashion photographers; photographers exhibited in SPACE included Juergen Teller, Jack Pierson, Nan Goldin and Catherine Opie. In 2012–2013, Miller was curator for Fujifilm's X-Series cameras; photographers William Eggleston, Stephen Shore, Nan Goldin, Ryan McGinley and Martin Parr were commissioned to shoot original photos using the cameras and the resulting photographs were presented at exhibitions in New York at the Aperture Foundation, Tokyo (at Omotesando Hills), Milan (at Galleria Carla Sozzani). and Seoul (at Hyundai Card Design Library). In 2010, Miller curated a ‘UT’ shirt series featuring black and white photography for apparel brand Uniqlo; the shirts featured contributions from Lee Friedander and Daidō Moriyama, among others, and were sold in Uniqlo stores worldwide. For New York Fashion Week, Miller curated fashion week photos and videos for Milk Studios, in New York with support from Leica cameras and Vimeo. and a series of conversations on art, music, fashion, health and design for MINI Cooper cars. Miller was consulting curator for a 'Saturdays at Phillips' auction of young artists by the Phillips de Pury auction house.

Tokion magazine founded Creativity Now, an annual arts and media conference in New York and Tokyo. Speakers at the conference were drawn from a variety of creative disciplines, and included musicians Brian Eno, Kim Gordon and James Murphy; fashion designers Proenza Schouler and Kim Jones; artists Tom Sachs, Doug Aitken and Raymond Pettibon; photographers Nan Goldin, Inez and Vinoodh, and Ryan McGinley, directors Lynne Ramsay, Mike Mills, Gaspar Noé, and John Cameron Mitchell; and graphic designer Peter Saville. In 2008 the Creativity Now conference won AdAge's Vanguard Award.

== Works as editor ==
Miller is the editor of PICTURES, which looks at "post-pictorial" photography, with a contribution from The New York Times Magazine photography director Kathy Ryan; PICTURES "celebrates the possibilities of the medium in and of itself". Target; 20 Years of Design for All by Chandelier Creative with Rizzoli International collects the retailer's two decades of collaborations with designers such as Philippe Starck, Marimekko and Michael Graves, fashion designers such as Victoria Beckham, Stephen Sprouse, Alexander McQueen and Rodarte and celebrities such as Chrissy Teigen and Gwen Stefani. Miller was interviewer and text editor for The Newsstand, published by Skira Rizzoli in conjunction with an exhibition at the Museum of Modern Art and Fondation Luis Vuitton in Paris. Miller was an editor of Opening Ceremony, a monograph on the fashion brand and retailer, published by Rizzoli. Miller is author-editor of SHOOT: Photography of the Moment, a fashion and fine art ‘snapshot’ photography compilation published with Rizzoli and supported with events and exhibitions at the New Museum in New York, Berkeley Art Museum, Tate Modern in London, Colette in Paris, FOAM Fotografiemuseum in Amsterdam, UCCA in Beijing, and PARCO in Tokyo. Miller was editor of Revisionaries, A Decade of Art in Tokion, published with Abrams Image. Miller was editor of Tokion magazine, a youth-culture oriented design, arts and style magazine. Tokion published two separate editions in English and Japanese, with distribution in North America, Europe and Japan. modo, was designed by IDEO.

== Works as writer ==
Since 2013, Ken has been a writer for T: The New York Times Style Magazine, contributing "Under the Influence", a recurring multimedia feature that profiles artists, musicians and designers. He has written travel books and contributed travel writing to National Public Radio.
