= Edgar Marsden =

Trinidadian cricketer

Personal information
- Full name: Edgar Gabriel Marsden
- Born: 25 March 1919; Pointe-à-Pierre, Trinidad
- Died: 15 October 2010 (aged 91); Trinidad and Tobago

Domestic team information
- Years: Team
- 1948-49: Trinidad

Career statistics
Competition	First-class
Matches	2
Runs scored	30
Batting average	10.00
100s/50s	0/0
Top score	18
Catches/stumpings	0/–
- Source: Cricinfo, 26 June 2018

Edgar Gabriel Marsden (25 March 1919 – 15 October 2010) was a Trinidad cricketer who played two matches of first-class cricket in 1949.

Edgar Marsden captained Trinidad in the only two first-class matches of the 1948-49 West Indies season, when Trinidad played Barbados twice at Kensington Oval, Bridgetown, over two weeks in January and February 1949. He batted in the lower middle order and made 30 runs in three innings.

He also played several times for South Trinidad in the Beaumont Cup in the 1940s, usually as opening batsman and captain.

Marsden and his wife Jean lived in the seaside suburb of Bayshore in Diego Martin, about five kilometres west of Queen's Park Oval, Port of Spain. He died in October 2020, aged 91.
