= Lance Murray =

Trinidadian cricketer

Personal information
- Full name: Lance Hamilton Murray
- Born: April 13, 1921; Trinidad
- Died: October 21, 2012 (aged 91); Westmoorings, Trinidad
- Bowling: Right-arm leg-spin
- Relatives: Deryck Murray (son)

Domestic team information
- Years: Team
- 1956-57: Trinidad
- 1948-49 to 1959-60: North Trinidad

Career statistics
Competition	First-class
Matches	3
Runs scored	55
Batting average	13.75
100s/50s	0/0
Top score	47 not out
Balls bowled	640
Wickets	11
Bowling average	27.36
5 wickets in innings	0
10 wickets in match	0
Best bowling	4/70
Catches/stumpings	0/0
- Source: Cricinfo, 22 November 2020

Lance Hamilton Murray (13 April 1921 – 21 October 2012) was a Trinidad cricketer who played three matches of first-class cricket between 1956 and 1960. He was the father of the West Indies Test cricketer Deryck Murray.

He became a prominent cricket administrator, and served as director of the West Indies Cricket Board. He was inducted into the Trinidad and Tobago Sports Hall of Fame in 1995 for his work as a sports administrator. He was awarded Trinidad and Tobago's Chaconia Gold Medal and Medal of Merit.

He was also a football player and coach.
