= Edward Peter (cricketer) =

Trinidadian cricketer

Personal information
- Born: 1902; Trinidad
- Died: 15 January 1985 (aged 82–83)
- Source: Cricinfo, 28 November 2020

Edward Peter (1902 – 15 January 1985) was a Trinidadian cricketer. He played in one first-class match for Trinidad and Tobago in 1936/37.

== See also ==
- List of Trinidadian representative cricketers
