= Mandilhon Leotaud =

Trinidadian cricketer

Personal information
- Born: 2 May 1871; Trinidad
- Died: 21 February 1935 (aged 63); Trinidad
- Source: Cricinfo, 28 November 2020

Mandilhon Leotaud (2 May 1871 – 21 February 1935) was a Trinidadian cricketer. He played in four first-class matches for Trinidad and Tobago from 1891 to 1895.

== See also ==
- List of Trinidadian representative cricketers
