= William Waller (cricketer) =

Trinidadian cricketer

Personal information
- Born: 25 January 1923; Trinidad
- Died: 16 January 1998 (aged 74); Wiltshire, England
- Source: Cricinfo, 28 November 2020

William Waller (25 January 1923 – 16 January 1998) was a Trinidadian cricketer. He played in two first-class matches for Trinidad and Tobago in 1942/43.

== See also ==
- List of Trinidadian representative cricketers
