= Ken Williams (Australian footballer) =

Australian rules footballer (1918–1977)

Personal information
- Full name: Kenneth John Williams
- Born: 7 January 1918; Morwell, Victoria
- Died: 29 November 1977 (aged 59)
- Original team: Yallourn Blues
- Height: 183 cm (6 ft 0 in)
- Weight: 85.5 kg (188 lb)

Playing career^{1}
Years	Club	Games (Goals)
1940	Collingwood	12 (2)
- ^{1} Playing statistics correct to the end of 1940.

Kenneth John Williams (7 January 1918 – 29 November 1977) was an Australian rules footballer who played with Collingwood in the Victorian Football League (VFL).
