= Oscar Durity =

Trinidadian cricketer (born 1950)

Personal information
- Full name: Oscar McGregor Durity
- Born: 14 August 1950 (age 76); Trinidad
- Source: Cricinfo, 28 November 2020

Oscar McGregor Durity (born 14 August 1950) is a Trinidadian cricketer. He played in twenty-four first-class matches for Trinidad and Tobago from 1968 to 1973. He also played football as a midfielder, and appeared for the Trinidad and Tobago national football team.

== See also ==
- List of Trinidadian representative cricketers
