= Chiki Sampath =

Trinidadian cricketer

Personal information
- Born: 9 December 1920; Trinidad
- Died: 11 March 1990 (aged 69)
- Source: Cricinfo, 28 November 2020

Chiki Sampath (9 December 1920 – 11 March 1990) was a Trinidadian cricketer. He played in six first-class matches for Trinidad and Tobago from 1948 to 1954.

== See also ==
- List of Trinidadian representative cricketers
