= Roland Sampath =

Trinidadian cricketer (born 1957)

Personal information
- Born: 21 June 1957 (age 69); Trinidad
- Source: Cricinfo, 28 November 2020

Roland Sampath (born 21 June 1957) is a Trinidadian cricketer. He played in nineteen first-class and eight List A matches for Trinidad and Tobago from 1975 to 1985.

== See also ==
- List of Trinidadian representative cricketers
