= Rodney Sooklal =

Trinidadian cricketer (born 1980)

Personal information
- Born: 21 December 1980 (age 45); Trinidad
- Source: Cricinfo, 28 November 2020

Rodney Sooklal (born 21 December 1980) is a Trinidadian cricketer. He played in ten first-class and nineteen List A matches for Trinidad and Tobago from 1999 to 2005.

== See also ==
- List of Trinidadian representative cricketers
