= Randall Lyon =

West Indian cricketer

Personal information
- Full name: John Randall Lyon
- Born: 4 March 1952 (age 74); Trinidad
- Batting: Right-handed
- Role: Wicket-keeper

Domestic team information
- Years: Team
- 1973-74 to 1977-78: North Trinidad
- 1975-76 to 1982-83: Trinidad

Career statistics
Competition	First-class	List A
Matches	40	10
Runs scored	616	40
Batting average	13.10	20.00
100s/50s	0/1	0/0
Top score	55	26
Balls bowled	96	–
Wickets	2	–
Bowling average	22.00	–
5 wickets in innings	0	–
10 wickets in match	0	n/a
Best bowling	2/31	–
Catches/stumpings	62/24	7/4
- Source: Cricket Archive, 29 June 2014

John Randall Lyon (born 4 March 1952, Trinidad) is a former Trinidad cricketer who played first-class cricket from 1974 to 1983. He toured India in 1978-79 with the West Indian team but did not play Test cricket.

A wicket-keeper and lower-order batsman, Randall Lyon made his first-class debut for North Trinidad in the Texaco Cup in the 1973-74 season. He first played for Trinidad in the 1975-76 Shell Shield, when he led the competition's fielding statistics with 11 dismissals, including five stumpings off the spin bowling of Raphick Jumadeen and Inshan Ali. He continued to play for Trinidad in 1976-77 and 1977–78, making his only first-class fifty against Barbados in 1977-78.

With most of the senior West Indian cricketers playing World Series Cricket in Australia in the 1978-79 season, Lyon was one of several inexperienced players to be selected for the tour of India. He played in most of the first-class matches outside the Tests. He continued to play for Trinidad until the end of the 1982-83 season.

Until Brendan Nash played in 2008, Lyon was the last white cricketer to represent the West Indies. He lives in Trinidad, where he has coached young wicket-keepers.
