= Adron Rahim =

Trinidadian cricketer (born 1971)

Personal information
- Born: 25 January 1971 (age 55); Trinidad
- Source: Cricinfo, 28 November 2020

Adron Rahim (born 25 January 1971) is a Trinidadian cricketer. He played in one first-class and one List A match for Trinidad and Tobago in 1990/91.

== See also ==
- List of Trinidadian representative cricketers
