= Arthur Trestrail =

Trinidadian cricketer

Personal information
- Born: 7 June 1921; Trinidad
- Died: 20 October 2014 (aged 93); Auckland, New Zealand
- Source: Cricinfo, 5 April 2016

Arthur Trestrail (7 June 1921 – 20 October 2014) was a Trinidadian cricketer. He played six first-class matches for Trinidad and Tobago between 1941 and 1947. His brother, Kenneth, also played first-class cricket.
