= Kenneth Trestrail =

West Indian and Canadian cricketer

- Kenneth Trestrail in 1950

Personal information
- Full name: Kenneth Basil Trestrail
- Born: 26 November 1927; Curepe, Trinidad
- Died: 24 December 1992 (aged 65); Toronto, Ontario, Canada
- Batting: Right-handed
- Bowling: Leg break
- Relatives: Arthur Trestrail (brother)

Domestic team information
- Years: Team
- 1954: Canada
- 1943/44–1949/50: Trinidad

Career statistics
Competition	First-class
Matches	41
Runs scored	2,183
Batting average	38.29
100s/50s	5/11
Top score	161*
Balls bowled	158
Wickets	4
Bowling average	28.50
5 wickets in innings	–
10 wickets in match	–
Best bowling	3/20
Catches/stumpings	23/–
- Source: CricketArchive, 14 October 2011

Kenneth Basil Trestrail (26 November 1927 – 24 December 1992) was a West Indian and Canadian cricketer. He was a right-handed batsman and a leg-break bowler.

He played 18 first-class matches for his native Trinidad in the 1940s, earning selection for the West Indian cricket team on their tour to England in 1950. He did not play in any of the Tests on that tour, but played in eighteen of the first-class tour matches, as well as scoring a hundred in each innings against Durham at Ashbrooke in Sunderland.

He later settled in Canada and returned to England in 1954 with the touring Canadian cricket team, playing four further first-class matches.

He is the great-uncle of Trinidadian music producer Victoria Trestrail.
