= K. V. Sampath Kumar =

Newspaper editor from Karnataka, India (died 2021)

K.V Sampath Kumar
- Born: 1956 or 1957
- Died: 30 June 2021 (aged 64)
- Citizenship: Indian
- Spouse: Jayalakshmi
- Awards: Padma Shri, 2020

KV Sampath Kumar (1957 – 30 June 2021) was an editor for Sanskrit newspaper "Sudharma" from Mysuru, Karnataka, India. In 2020, he along with his wife, Jayalakhshmi, was selected for the Padma Shri honour from the Government of India for his contribution to the field of Literature & Education.

== Career ==
Sampath Kumar started his career in Sanskrit journalism by joining his father's Sanskrit newspaper Sudharma and was a law graduate and was Vidwath in Sahithya.

Kumar died at the age of 64 on 30 June 2021 following a heart attack.

== Awards ==
- 2020: Received the Padma Shri from the Government of India for the contribution to the field of Literature & Education.
