= Clarence Skeete =

West Indian cricketer

Personal information
- Full name: Clarence Reynold Skeete
- Born: 3 June 1916; Tunapuna, Trinidad
- Died: 22 December 2001 (aged 85); Trinidad

Domestic team information
- Years: Team
- 1941-42 to 1951-52: Trinidad

Career statistics
Competition	First-class
Matches	16
Runs scored	559
Batting average	25.40
100s/50s	1/1
Top score	111
Balls bowled	2741
Wickets	52
Bowling average	30.19
5 wickets in innings	1
10 wickets in match	–
Best bowling	6/99
Catches/stumpings	11/–
- Source: Cricinfo, 25 August 2014

Clarence Reynold Skeete (3 June 1916 – 22 December 2001) was a cricketer who played first-class cricket for Trinidad from 1942 to 1952.

His best bowling figures were 6 for 99 for Trinidad against Jamaica in 1946. His highest score was 111 against Barbados in 1948-49; in the match he scored 37 and 111 and took 3 for 85 and 4 for 118.
