= Dinanath Ramnarine =

West Indian cricketer (born 1975)

Personal information
- Full name: Dinanath Ramnarine
- Born: 4 June 1975 (age 51); Chaguanas, Trinidad and Tobago
- Batting: Left-handed
- Bowling: Leg break

International information
- National side: West Indies (1997–2002)
- Test debut: 27 February 1998 v England
- Last Test: 7 February 2002 v Pakistan
- ODI debut: 6 June 1997 v Sri Lanka
- Last ODI: 12 May 2001 v South Africa

Domestic team information
- Years: Team
- 1993–2004: Trinidad and Tobago

Career statistics
Competition	Tests	ODIs	FC	LA
Matches	12	4	68	49
Runs scored	106	5	773	146
Batting average	6.23	1.66	9.31	6.63
100s/50s	0/0	0/0	0/0	0/0
Top score	35*	2	43	25*
Balls bowled	3,495	200	15,694	2,385
Wickets	45	3	252	71
Bowling average	30.73	54.66	25.60	21.00
5 wickets in innings	1	0	12	1
10 wickets in match	0	0	1	0
Best bowling	5/78	2/52	6/54	5/24
Catches/stumpings	8/–	0/–	43/–	8/–
- Source: Cricket Archive (subscription required), 24 October 2010

Dinanath Ramnarine (born June 4, 1975) is a Trinidadian cricketer who retired in 2002.

He was a leg-spin bowler who retired at an early age (28 years). He has a Test bowling average of approximately 30, taking 45 wickets in his 12 test matches, which is higher when compared other cricketers. After his premature retirement, he went on to successfully lead the West Indies Players Association (WIPA) with high standards and ended up winning 15 out of 15 Arbitration matters against the WICB. Among his other major accomplishments was the signing of the first Collective Agreement between WIPA and WICB, starting the Annual Player Awards Function and establishing a development program known as the "WIPA in the Community" where a possible 10,000 children to date have participated using cricket to teach valuable life skills. He further established a personal development program for which 150 first class players benefited. Mr. Ramnarine is known as "players champion" and a man with good moral backing.

On 21 August 2021, he was appointed as the team advisor for Trinbago Knight Riders for the 2021 Caribbean Premier League season.

== FICA ==
He is a board member of the Federation of International Cricketers' Associations.
