= Unity, Guyana =

Unity Village
- Village
- Location in Guyana
- Coordinates: 6°46′52″N 58°07′42″W
- Country: Guyana
- Region: Demerara-Mahaica

Population (2012)
  - Total: 455
- Time zone: UTC-4
- Climate: Af

Unity is a rural village in the East Coast district of the Demerara-Mahaica region of Guyana. The village is notable for being the birthplace of the West Indies cricket team former captain Shivnarine Chanderpaul, former fast bowler Colin Croft and former president of Guyana Bharrat Jagdeo.

The village of Unity is divided into three sub-villages: Unity (pop. 455), Lancaster (pop. 853) and Mosquito Hall (pop. 951).

There are also 3 other villages called 'Unity' in the 2012 Census, 2 smaller villages in Region 2, and one in Region 3.

The sub-village of Mosquito Hall was named for an old plantation.

The main economic activities are fishing and farming. The area is subjected to flooding from seawall breaches on the coast, due to high tides deteriorating the structures.

== Public Services ==
Unity Nursery School, Lancaster Secondary, Unity/Lancaster Mandir, a health centre and Cheshire Home, established in 1972 for providing care to children and adults with disabilities and the Mahaica Children’s home opened in 2013. The area once had a Leprosarium, which resulted in parts of the area being considered 'unclean' by association.

Gibson Primary for the children of Unity and Lancaster Primary for the children of Lancaster and Mosquito Hall. However, the two schools shared the same ballfield and at recess the children played together. Lancaster Primary later became a Secondary School, but the name can still be seen in faded paint on the building.

Neighboring town of Mahaica also is a common destination for healthcare and their market.
