= Aneil Kanhai =

Trinidadian cricketer (born 1982)

Personal information
- Born: 12 April 1982 (age 44); Trinidad
- Source: Cricinfo, 28 November 2020

Aneil Kanhai (born 12 April 1982) is a Trinidadian cricketer. He played in twenty-four first-class and five List A matches for Trinidad and Tobago from 2001 to 2012.

== See also ==
- List of Trinidadian representative cricketers
