= Sampath Kumar D.Y. =

Indian dancer and choreographer

Dasari Yethiraja Sampath Kumar, sometimes known as D. Y. Sampath Kumar (20 November 1927 – 21 May 1999), popularly referred to as "Andhra Jalari" ("Fisherman of Andhra Pradesh"), was an Indian classical and folk dancer and choreographer. He assimilated the ancient traditions of dance and music of South India under the tutelage of various gurus like Sri Peri Narasimha Shastry who taught him the veena and Duvvuri Jagannadha Sarma who taught him Bharatanatyam. He became an exponent of various dance styles like Bharatanatyam, Kuchipudi, Yakshagana and folk dances. He gave thousands of performances with brilliant embellishments in several states and in many countries.
