= Trinidad and Tobago Cricket Board =

National governing board for the sport of cricket

The Trinidad & Tobago Cricket Board (TTCB) is the ruling body for cricket in Trinidad and Tobago. The current board was incorporated in the Parliament of Trinidad and Tobago under Act No. 34 of 1989.

== History ==
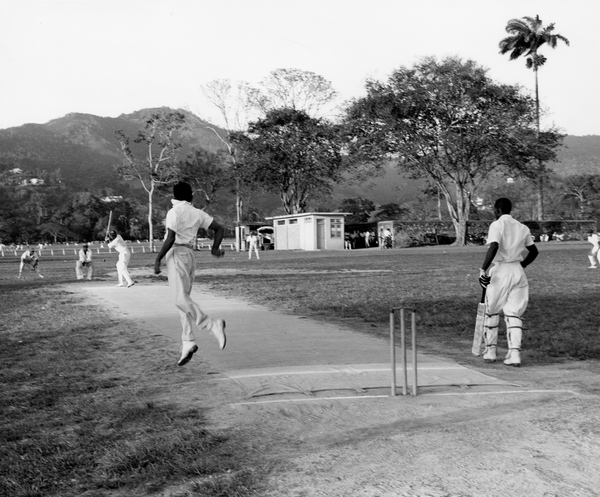
Cricket game in Trinidad, 1960

The authority was originally established on June 26, 1956 under the name Trinidad Cricket Council. In 1958 it was renamed the Trinidad and Tobago Cricket Council to incorporate and reflect the sister isle of Tobago. In January 1980 it was renamed the Trinidad and Tobago Cricket Board of Control, and subsequently in 2003 assumed its current name.
