= Jeff Jones (Guyanese cricketer) =

Guyanese cricketer

Personal information
- Born: 25 June 1958 (age 68); Suddie, British Guiana
- Batting: Right-handed
- Role: Wicket-keeper

Domestic team information
- Years: Team
- 1980: Essequibo

Career statistics
Competition	FC
Matches	1
Runs scored	10
Batting average	5.00
100s/50s	0/0
Top score	5
Catches/stumpings	1/1
- Source: CricketArchive, 1 December 2014

Jeff Jones (born 25 June 1958) is a former Guyanese cricketer who played a single first-class match for Essequibo in the final of the 1980–81 inter-county Jones Cup.

Jones, a right-handed batsman and wicket-keeper, was born in Suddie in what was then British Guiana (now part of Guyana's Pomeroon-Supenaam region). He was one of four Essequibo players from Suddie, the others being batsmen Alfred Maycock and Lennox Alves, and fast bowler Courtney Gonsalves. In the match, played against Berbice at the Kayman Sankar Cricket Ground in Hampton Court (on the Atlantic coast), Jones scored five runs in each innings. He came in ninth in Essequibo's first innings, and was caught by Hubern Evans off the bowling of Leslaine Lambert. He was again dismissed by Lambert in the second innings (caught by Derek Kallicharran), having been promoted to number three, behind Fitz Garraway and Kamroze Mohammed. Jones effected only two dismissals during the match, catching Amarnauth Ramcharitar from fast bowler Egbert Stephens and stumping Hubern Evans off of Alfred Maycock's medium pacers

Berbice won the match by nine wickets in what was Essequibo's only first-class match – only the final of the three-team Jones Cup (later the Guystac Trophy) was accorded first-class status, and Essequibo made the final only once, having defeated Demerara in an earlier match. The scorecards of the non-first-class matches played by Essequibo are not available before the late 1990s, and it is therefore uncertain how Jones played for Essequibo in other matches.
