= Lennox Alves =

Guyanese cricketer

Personal information
- Born: 7 March 1956 (age 70); Suddie, British Guiana
- Batting: Right-handed
- Role: Batsman

Domestic team information
- Years: Team
- 1980: Essequibo

Career statistics
Competition	FC
Matches	1
Runs scored	39
Batting average	19.50
100s/50s	0/0
Top score	29
Catches/stumpings	1/–
- Source: CricketArchive, 1 December 2014

Lennox Alves (born 7 March 1956) is a former Guyanese cricketer who played a single first-class match for Essequibo in the final of the 1980–81 inter-county Jones Cup.

Alves, a right-handed batsman, was born in Suddie in what was then British Guiana (now part of Guyana's Pomeroon-Supenaam region). He was one of four Essequibo players from Suddie, the others being batsman Alfred Maycock, wicket-keeper Jeff Jones, and fast bowler Courtney Gonsalves. In the match, played against Berbice at the Kayman Sankar Cricket Ground in Hampton Court (on the Atlantic coast), he scored 39 runs across his two innings. In the first innings, he scored 10 runs before being caught by Reginald Etwaroo off the bowling of Derek Kallicharran, a brother of West Indies Test player Alvin Kallicharran. In the second innings, he scored 29 runs (bettered only by Patrick Evans' 34 runs), before being dismissed by Etwaroo, caught by Amarnauth Ramcharitar.

Berbice won the match by nine wickets in what was Essequibo's only first-class match – only the final of the three-team Jones Cup (later the Guystac Trophy) was accorded first-class status, and Essequibo made the final only once, having defeated Demerara in an earlier match. The scorecards of the non-first-class matches played by Essequibo are not available before the late 1990s, and it is therefore uncertain how Alves performed for Essequibo in other matches.
