= Courtney Gonsalves =

Guyanese cricketer

Personal information
- Full name: Courtney Alexander Gonsalves
- Born: 31 August 1950; Suddie, British Guiana
- Died: 31 March 2013 (aged 62); Toronto, Ontario, Canada
- Batting: Right-handed
- Bowling: Right-arm medium-fast
- Role: Bowler

Domestic team information
- Years: Team
- 1980: Essequibo
- 1981: Guyana

Career statistics
Competition	FC	LA
Matches	1	2
Runs scored	0	8
Batting average	0.00	n/a
100s/50s	0/0	0/0
Top score	0	7*
Balls bowled	108	42
Wickets	3	1
Bowling average	25.33	30.00
5 wickets in innings	0	0
10 wickets in match	0	n/a
Best bowling	3/69	1/10
Catches/stumpings	0/–	0/–
- Source: CricketArchive, 1 December 2014

Courtney Alexander Gonsalves (31 August 1950 – 31 March 2013) was a Guyanese cricketer who played a single first-class match for Essequibo in the final of the 1980–81 inter-county Jones Cup, and also represented the Guyanese national side in the 1980–81 limited-overs Geddes Grant/Harrison Line Trophy. He later coached the Canadian national under-19 team.

Gonsalves, a right-arm fast bowler, was born in Suddie in what was then British Guiana (now part of Guyana's Pomeroon-Supenaam region). He was one of four Essequibo players from Suddie, the others being batsmen Alfred Maycock and Lennox Alves, and wicket-keeper Jeff Jones. In his match for Essequibo, played against Berbice at the Kayman Sankar Cricket Ground in Hampton Court (on the Atlantic coast), Gonsalves opened the bowling with Egbert Stephens in each innings. He took three wickets from 16 overs in the first innings, finishing with 3/69, and failed to take a wicket in the second innings, conceding seven runs from two overs. While batting, he recorded a pair, the only Essequibian to do so.

Berbice won the match by nine wickets in what was Essequibo's only first-class match – only the final of the three-team Jones Cup (later the Guystac Trophy) was accorded first-class status, and Essequibo made the final only once, having defeated Demerara in an earlier match. The scorecards of the non-first-class matches played by Essequibo are not available before the late 1990s, and it is therefore uncertain how Gonsalves performed for Essequibo in earlier matches. However, later in the 1980–81 season, he played in the first two of Guyana's matches in the limited-overs Geddes Grant/Harrison Line Trophy.

Gonsalves made his debut for Guyana against the Windward Islands at Arnos Vale in Kingstown, Saint Vincent. He took 1/10 on debut from four overs, opening the bowling with Ray Joseph and taking the wicket of Vincentian opening batsman Lance John. He was less successful in his second match, played a week later against Barbados at Kensington Oval, Bridgetown, going wicketless and conceding 20 runs from three overs, mostly to Desmond Haynes. Gonsalves was the first Essequibian to go on to play for the Guyanese national side, which was at that time dominated by players from Berbice and Demerara.

After the conclusion of his playing career, Gonsalves took up coaching, and was also at one stage a selector for the Guyanese national team. In 1998, he was awarded "Coach of the Year" by the Guyana Cricket Board, for his role in coaching North Essequibo to victories at several national tournaments. In later life, Gonsalves emigrated to Toronto. He became involved in Canadian cricket, and, assisted by Pubudu Dassanayake, coached the Canadian national under-19 side during its unsuccessful attempt to qualify for the 2008 Under-19 World Cup.
