= Egbert Stephens =

Guyanese cricketer

Personal information
- Born: 15 April 1952 (age 74); Dartmouth, British Guiana
- Batting: Right-handed
- Bowling: Right-arm fast-medium
- Role: Bowler

Domestic team information
- Years: Team
- 1980: Essequibo

Career statistics
Competition	FC
Matches	1
Runs scored	22
Batting average	n/a
100s/50s	0/0
Top score	18*
Balls bowled	87
Wickets	6
Bowling average	11.00
5 wickets in innings	1
10 wickets in match	0
Best bowling	5/56
Catches/stumpings	0/–
- Source: CricketArchive, 1 December 2014

Egbert Stephens (born 15 April 1952) is a former Guyanese cricketer who played a single first-class match for Essequibo in the final of the 1980–81 inter-county Jones Cup.

Stephens, a right-arm fast bowler, was born in Dartmouth in what was then British Guiana (now part of Guyana's Pomeroon-Supenaam region). He was one of two Essequibo players from Dartmouth, the other being opening batsman Fitz Garraway. In the match, played against Berbice at the Kayman Sankar Cricket Ground in Hampton Court (on the Atlantic coast), Stephens opened the bowling with Courtney Gonsalves in each innings. He took six wickets for the match, including a five-wicket haul, 5/56, in Berbice's first innings, the only first-class five-wicket haul by an Essequibian and the best figures of the match. Stephens dismissed four of Berbice's top-order batsman, including their captain Romain Etwaroo and future West Indies international Milton Pydanna, and also took the only wicket to fall in Berbice's second innings, bowling Hubern Evans for a duck. While batting, Stephens came in tenth in each innings, twice remaining not out.

Berbice won the match by nine wickets in what was Essequibo's only first-class match – only the final of the three-team Jones Cup (later the Guystac Trophy) was accorded first-class status, and Essequibo made the final only once, having defeated Demerara in an earlier match. The scorecards of the non-first-class matches played by Essequibo are not available before the late 1990s, and it is therefore uncertain how Stephens played for Essequibo (if at all) in earlier matches. Despite Stephens' performance for Essequibo, it was his opening partner, Courtney Gonsalves, who was selected to play for the Guyanese national side later in the season, appearing in two List A matches.
