= Alfred Maycock =

Guyanese cricketer

Personal information
- Full name: Aubrey Alfred Maycock
- Born: 26 June 1949 (age 77); Suddie, British Guiana
- Batting: Right-handed
- Role: Batsman

Domestic team information
- Years: Team
- 1980: Essequibo

Career statistics
Competition	FC
Matches	1
Runs scored	24
Batting average	12.00
100s/50s	0/0
Top score	21
Balls bowled	24
Wickets	1
Bowling average	24.00
5 wickets in innings	0
10 wickets in match	0
Best bowling	1/24
Catches/stumpings	0/–
- Source: CricketArchive, 1 December 2014

Aubrey Alfred Maycock (born 26 June 1949) is a former Guyanese cricketer who played a single first-class match for Essequibo in the final of the 1980–81 inter-county Jones Cup.

Maycock was born in Suddie in what was then British Guiana (now part of Guyana's Pomeroon-Supenaam region). During the 1975–76 season, the Pakistan International Airlines cricket team toured the West Indies, playing two matches in Georgetown. Maycock was selected for the Guyanese national side in one of those matches, although it was not accorded first-class status. In his match for Essequibo, Maycock batted high in the batting order in both innings of the match, played against Berbice at the Kayman Sankar Cricket Ground in Hampton Court (on the Atlantic coast). In the first innings, he came in third after Fitz Garraway and Kamroze Mohammed, scoring 21 runs before being caught by Leslaine Lambert off the bowling of Reginald Etwaroo. In the second innings, Jeff Jones, Essequibo's wicket-keeper, was promoted to bat first-drop ahead of Maycock. Both Jones (five runs) and Maycock (three runs) went cheaply, with Maycock caught by future West Indies ODI keeper Milton Pydanna off the bowling of Kamal Singh. Bowling right-arm medium pace, Maycock also took a single wicket from four overs in Berbice's first innings, having Hubern Evans stumped by Jones for 14 runs.

Berbice won the match by nine wickets in what was Essequibo's only first-class match – only the final of the three-team Jones Cup (later the Guystac Trophy) was accorded first-class status, and Essequibo made the final only once, having defeated Demerara in an earlier match. The scorecards of the non-first-class matches played by Essequibo are not available before the late 1990s, and it is therefore uncertain how Maycock played for Essequibo in other matches. He did, however, make 94 runs in an inter-county match against Demerara at some stage, coming up against Colin Croft, one of the West Indies' finest fast bowlers at the time.
