= Fitz Garraway =

Guyanese cricketer

Personal information
- Born: 5 September 1947 (age 79); Dartmouth, British Guiana
- Batting: Right-handed
- Role: Batsman

Domestic team information
- Years: Team
- 1980: Essequibo

Career statistics
Competition	First-class
Matches	1
Runs scored	48
Batting average	24.00
100s/50s	0/0
Top score	31
Catches/stumpings	2/–
- Source: CricketArchive, 1 December 2014

Fitz Garraway (born 5 September 1947) is a former Guyanese cricketer who played a single first-class match for Essequibo in the final of the 1980–81 inter-county Jones Cup. Aged 33, he was the oldest player on the side, a year older than Beni Sankar.

Born in Dartmouth in what was then British Guiana (now part of Guyana's Pomeroon-Supenaam region), Garraway opened the batting with Kamroze Mohammed in both innings of the match, played against Berbice at the Kayman Sankar Cricket Ground in Hampton Court (on the Atlantic coast). He scored 31 runs in the first innings, before being caught by Milton Pydanna, a future West Indies ODI wicket-keeper, off the bowling of Suresh Ganouri. In the second innings, he scored 17 runs, before being bowled by Leslaine Lambert. Garraway also recorded a single catch in Berbice's first innings, dismissing one of their opening batsman, Tyrone Etwaroo, from Courtenay Gonsalves' medium-fast bowling. He was one of two Essequibo players from Dartmouth in the match, the other being fast bowler Egbert Stephens.

Berbice won the match by nine wickets in what was Essequibo's only first-class match – only the final of the three-team Jones Cup (later the Guystac Trophy) was accorded first-class status, and Essequibo made the final only once, having defeated Demerara in an earlier match. The scorecards of the non-first-class matches played by Essequibo are not available before the late 1990s, and it is therefore uncertain how Garraway played for Essequibo (if at all) in earlier matches.
