= Malcolm Williams (cricketer) =

Guyanese cricketer

Personal information
- Born: 16 August 1949 (age 77); Vergenoegen, British Guiana

Domestic team information
- Years: Team
- 1980: Essequibo

Career statistics
Competition	FC
Matches	1
Runs scored	18
Batting average	9.00
100s/50s	0/0
Top score	15
Balls bowled	42
Wickets	0
Bowling average	n/a
5 wickets in innings	0
10 wickets in match	0
Best bowling	0/14
Catches/stumpings	0/–
- Source: CricketArchive, 1 December 2014

Malcolm Williams (born 16 August 1949) is a former Guyanese cricketer who played a single first-class match for Essequibo in the final of the 1980–81 inter-county Jones Cup.

Williams was born in Vergenoegen in what was then British Guiana (now part of Guyana's Essequibo Islands-West Demerara region). He was one of two players from Vergenoegen in the Essequibo side, the other being Kamroze Mohammed. The match was played against Berbice at the Kayman Sankar Cricket Ground in Hampton Court (on the Atlantic coast). Williams, a bowler and tail-end batsman, failed to take a wicket during the game, bowling five overs in Berbice's first innings and two in their second. He scored three runs while batting in Essequibo's first innings, and made 15 runs in the second innings before being dismissed by spinner Jerry Angus, who had him stumped by Milton Pydanna, a future West Indies ODI player.

Berbice won the match by nine wickets in what was Essequibo's only first-class match – only the final of the three-team Jones Cup (later the Guystac Trophy) was accorded first-class status, and Essequibo made the final only once, having defeated Demerara in an earlier match. The scorecards of the non-first-class matches played by Essequibo are not available before the late 1990s, and it is therefore uncertain how Williams played for Essequibo (if at all) in earlier matches.
