= Beni Sankar =

Guyanese cricketer

Personal information
- Full name: Beni Gopaul Sankar
- Born: 25 September 1948 (age 78); Cornelia Ida, British Guiana
- Batting: Right-handed
- Bowling: Right-arm medium
- Role: Batsman

Domestic team information
- Years: Team
- 1980: Essequibo

Career statistics
Competition	FC
Matches	1
Runs scored	22
Batting average	11.00
100s/50s	0/0
Top score	20
Balls bowled	6
Wickets	0
Bowling average	n/a
5 wickets in innings	0
10 wickets in match	0
Best bowling	0/4
Catches/stumpings	0/–
- Source: CricketArchive, 1 December 2014

Beni Gopaul Sankar (born 25 September 1948) is a Guyanese businessman and former cricketer. He captained Essequibo in its only first-class match, in the final of the 1980–81 inter-county Jones Cup.

Sankar was born at Cornelia Ida, in what is now the Essequibo Islands-West Demerara region of Guyana, but was then considered to be part of the county of Demerara in British Guiana. He is thus the only Essequibo first-class cricketer born outside of Essequibo county. Sankar's father, Kayman Sankar, who died in February 2014, was an Indo-Guyanese rice magnate, who rose from a labourer to "Guyana’s most successful rice farmer". Beni Sankar studied at England's National College of Agricultural Engineering in Silsoe, Bedfordshire, graduating in 1974, and entered his father's employment, eventually becoming CEO of the Kayman Sankar Group. He was also a director of Demerara Distilleries and Demerara Bank, and in the late 2000s helped to establish Guyana's aquaculture industry, establishing 25 acres of fish ponds at his father's property in Hampton Court. Sankar has also served as president of Guyana's Private Sector Commission (from 1994 to 1996), president of Georgetown's Rotary Club, and chairman of the Caribbean Rice Association.

Outside of business, Sankar has been keenly involved in Guyanese sport, holding a pilots' licence and serving as a president of the Guyana Table Tennis Association and as a vice-president of the Guyana Cricket Board. His first-class cricket career was brief, consisting only of a single match for Essequibo. The match was played against Berbice at the Kayman Sankar Cricket Ground, named for Sankar's father and located near his Hampton Court property. Sankar captained Essequibo, and, playing as a top-order batsman, scored two runs in the first innings and 20 runs in the second innings. He also bowled a single over of right-arm medium pace in Berbice's second innings, conceding four runs without taking a wicket. Berbice won the match by nine wickets in what was Essequibo's only first-class match – only the final of the three-team Jones Cup (later the Guystac Trophy) was accorded first-class status, and Essequibo made the final only once, having defeated Demerara in an earlier match. The scorecards of the non-first-class matches played by Essequibo are not available before the late 1990s, and it is therefore uncertain how Sankar played for Essequibo in other matches.
