= Kamroze Mohammed =

Guyanese cricketer

Personal information
- Born: 6 January 1951 (age 75); Vergenoegen, British Guiana
- Batting: Right-handed
- Role: Batsman

Domestic team information
- Years: Team
- 1980: Essequibo

Career statistics
Competition	FC
Matches	1
Runs scored	7
Batting average	3.50
100s/50s	0/0
Top score	7
Catches/stumpings	0/–
- Source: CricketArchive, 1 December 2014

Kamroze Mohammed (born 6 January 1951) is a former Guyanese cricketer who played a single first-class match for Essequibo in the final of the 1980–81 inter-county Jones Cup.

Born in Vergenoegen in what was then British Guiana (now part of Guyana's Essequibo Islands-West Demerara region), Mohammed opened the batting with Fitz Garraway in both innings of the match, played against Berbice at the Kayman Sankar Cricket Ground in Hampton Court (on the Atlantic coast). He scored seven runs in the first innings, before being dismissed by Reginald Etwaroo leg before wicket. In the second innings, he was out for a duck, caught by Amarnauth Ramcharitar off the bowling of Kamal Singh. Mohammed was one of only two Essequibo players to record ducks in the match, with the other being fast bowler and number-eleven batsman Courtney Gonsalves, who recorded a pair. He was one of two players from Vergenoegen in the match, the other being Malcolm Williams.

Berbice won the match by nine wickets in what was Essequibo's only first-class match – only the final of the three-team Jones Cup (later the Guystac Trophy) was accorded first-class status, and Essequibo made the final only once, having defeated Demerara in an earlier match. The scorecards of the non-first-class matches played by Essequibo are not available before the late 1990s, and it is therefore uncertain how Mohammed played for Essequibo (if at all) in earlier matches.
