= Nezam Hafiz =

Guyanese-born American cricketer (1969-2001)

Personal information
- Full name: Nezam Ahmed Hafiz
- Born: April 21, 1969; Rose Hall, East Berbice-Corentyne, Guyana
- Died: September 11, 2001 (aged 32); North Tower, World Trade Center, New York City, U.S.
- Batting: Right-handed
- Bowling: Right-arm medium

Domestic team information
- Years: Team
- 1998/99: United States
- 1988/89–1990/91: Guyana
- 1988/89: Demerara

Career statistics
| Competition | First-class | List A |
|---|---|---|
| Matches | 6 | 3 |
| Runs scored | 40 | 5 |
| Batting average | 10.00 | 5.00 |
| 100s/50s | –/– | –/– |
| Top score | 30 | 4 |
| Balls bowled | 18 | – |
| Wickets | – | – |
| Bowling average | – | – |
| 5 wickets in innings | – | – |
| 10 wickets in match | – | – |
| Best bowling | – | – |
| Catches/stumpings | 3/– | 1/– |
- Source: Cricinfo, 4 October 2011

Nezam Ahmed Hafiz (April 21, 1969 – September 11, 2001) was a Guyanese-born American cricketer. Hafiz was a right-handed middle order batsman who bowled right-arm medium pace. He was killed in the North Tower as it collapsed at 10:28 a.m. during the September 11 attacks.

== Cricket career ==
Having played cricket from a young age, Hafiz captained the Guyana Under-19 cricket team in the 1988 Northern Telecom Youth Tournament, a tournament with other under-19 teams from the West Indies. His first match as under-19 captain came against Trinidad and Tobago Under-19s, captained by Brian Lara. Hafiz made his first-class debut later that year for Demerara in the final of the 1988/89 Guystac Trophy against Berbice, with the match ending in a draw. His debut for Guyana against Barbados in that same seasons Red Stripe Cup. Struggling to find a regular starting place in what was a strong Guyana team of the 1980s and early 1990s, he made four further first-class appearances for Guyana, the last of which came against the Leeward Islands. In his five first-class matches for Guyana, he scored 40 runs at an average of 10.00, with a high score of 30. He made two List A appearances for his home country, with both coming in the 1988/89 Geddes Grant Shield against the Leeward Islands and the Windward Islands.

He joined his parents and two older sisters in New York in 1992, prior to his departure he donated his cricket equipment to his local cricket club in Georgetown. Following his relocation to the United States, Hafiz went on to play a single List A match for the United States national cricket team against the Leeward Islands when the United States were invited to take part in the 1998–99 Red Stripe Bowl. In his only major appearance for the United States, he was absent hurt in their batting innings. He also toured England with the United States team in 2000.

== Death ==
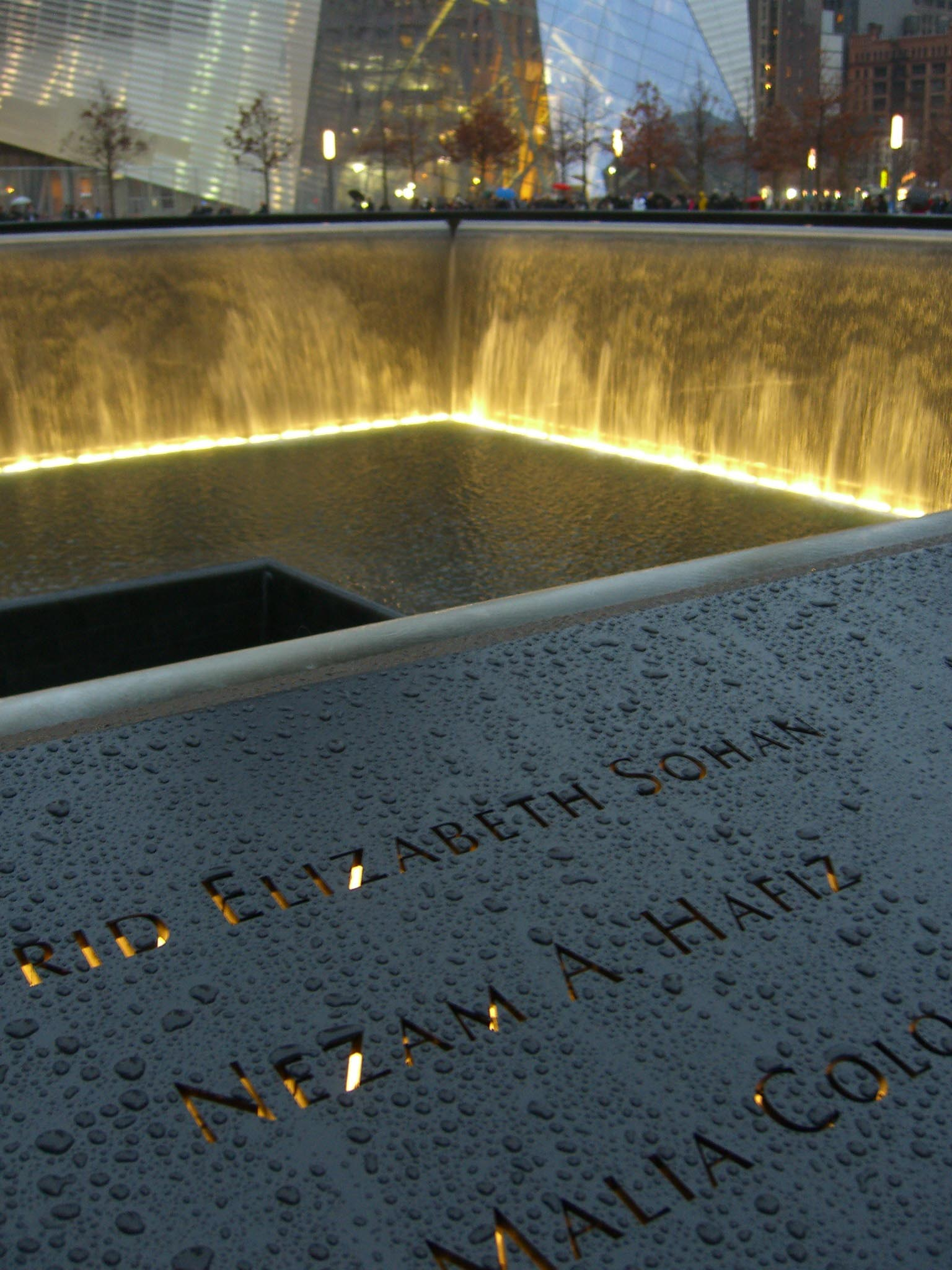
Hafiz's name is located on Panel N-6 of the National September 11 Memorial's North Pool.

Hafiz was killed in the September 11 attacks on the World Trade Center. He had been working as a financial assistant for insurance company Marsh and McLennan, whose office was on the 94th floor of Tower One, which was destroyed by the impact of American Airlines Flight 11 at 8:46 a.m., killing everyone on the floor in the process. At the time of his death he was living at South Ozone Park, Queens. His name is one of the 2,983 names inscribed at the National September 11 Memorial & Museum at the World Trade Center site. His name can be found on Panel N-6 of the North Pool. Hafiz's remains, if recovered, have never been identified.
