= Linden Joseph =

West Indian cricketer

Personal information
- Full name: Linden Anthony Joseph
- Born: 8 January 1969 (age 57); Georgetown, Demerara, Guyana
- Batting: Right-handed
- Bowling: Right-arm fast

Domestic team information
- Years: Team
- 1986/87–1988/89: Demerara
- 1986/87–1994/95: Guyana
- 1990: Hampshire

Career statistics
Competition	First-class	List A
Matches	39	23
Runs scored	797	189
Batting average	19.92	15.75
100s/50s	–/3	–/–
Top score	69*	34
Balls bowled	4,988	1,068
Wickets	98	28
Bowling average	29.75	26.03
5 wickets in innings	2	–
10 wickets in match	–	–
Best bowling	6/51	4/26
Catches/stumpings	8/–	3/–
- Source: Cricinfo, 8 December 2009

Linden Anthony Joseph (born 8 January 1969) is a former Guyanese cricketer.

Joseph was born in January 1969 at Georgetown, Guyana. Having represented Guyana at Under-19 level, Joseph made his debut in first-class cricket for Demerara against Berbice in the 1986–87 Guystac Trophy final at Georgetown. In March 1987, he made his debut for Guyana in first-class cricket, against Barbados, whilst also making his debut in List A one-day cricket the following month against Trinidad and Tobago in the 1986–87 Geddes Grant/Harrison Line Trophy. Having appeared for a Young West Indies cricket team against the touring Zimbabweans in two first-class and three List A matches in October–November 1989, and for Guyana in the 1989–90 Red Stripe Cup, Joseph was signed by English county side Hampshire ahead of the 1990 season on the recommendation of Malcolm Marshall. He made just six first-class appearances for Hampshire, taking seven wickets at an expensive average of exactly 66; his season at Hampshire was more notable for his batting, despite being in the team as a bowler. He scored 152 runs in five innings, being dismissed once and recording what would be highest first-class score of 69 not out against Oxford University. He also made one List A appearance against the Combined Universities in the Benson & Hedges Cup.

Joseph continued to play representative cricket for Guyana until 1995, making a total of 24 first-class and 19 one-day appearances. He took 67 wickets for Guyana in first-class matches, at an average of 27.74; he twice took a five wicket haul, with his best bowling figures of 6 for 51 coming against Jamaica. With the bat, he scored 459 runs at a batting average of 14.80, with a single half century score of 52. In one-day cricket, he took 23 wickets at an average of 25.73, with best figures of 4 for 26. In addition to playing first-class cricket for the aforementioned teams, Joseph also played twice each for the West Indies Under-23s and for the West Indies A. His overall first-class bowling record with his right-arm fast bowling was 98 wickets at an average of 29.75. While he did not return to English county cricket, Joseph did play in the Lancashire League for Enfield in 1991 and 1992.
