= Blairmont Sports Club Ground =

Cricket and football ground in Blairmont, Guyana

- Blairmont Community Centre
- Interactive map of Blairmont Sports Club Ground

Ground information
- Location: Blairmont, Guyana
- Country: Guyana
- Coordinates: 6.2503°N 57.5439°W
- Establishment: 1959
- Capacity: 1,000

Team information
| Berbice | (1989/90) |
| Guyana | (1992/93–2011/12) |
- As of 21 April 2022; Source: Ground profile

Blairmont Sports Club Ground is a cricket and football ground in Blairmont, Guyana.

== History ==
Located next to the Blairmont Estate sugar plantation, the ground was opened in 1959 and first played host to first-class cricket when Berbice played Demerara in the 1989–90 Kenneth Sookram Memorial Trophy. Guyana later played two first-class matches there in the 1992–93 Red Stripe Cup 1992-93 and 1992–93 Red Stripe Cup, playing against Trinidad and Tobago and the Leeward Islands respectively. List A one-day cricket was first played there in February 1994, when Guyana played the Leeward Islands in the Geddes Grant Shield. Guyana played a further three one-day matches there in 1995 and 1996, before the ground played host to three neutral one-day matches in 2004 and 2007; one of these saw Barbados dismiss West Indies under-19s for 18 runs, the lowest total in the history of List A one-day cricket, with Pedro Collins taking figures of 7 for 11. Guyana returned to the ground in 2008 and 2011, playing two further one-day matches there.

As a football venue, the ground has played host to three international matches. The first of these came in 2004 and saw Guyana lose 3–1 to Grenada in a preliminary qualifying match for the 2006 World Cup. The next two came in 2008, with Guyana playing Saint Vincent and the Grenadines in a friendly, and Suriname and Dominica playing one another in a qualifying match for the 2009 CONCACAF Gold Cup.

== Records ==
=== First-class ===
- Highest team total: 410 all out by Demerara v Berbice, 1989–90
- Lowest team total: 85 all out by Trinidad and Tobago v Guyana, 1992–93
- Highest individual innings: 114 by Ravindranauth Seeram for Demerara v Berbice, 1989–90
- Best bowling in an innings: 7-40 by Clyde Butts for Guyana v Trinidad and Tobago, 1992–93
- Best bowling in a match: 10-99 by Roger Harper for Guyana v Leeward Islands, 1993–94

=== List A ===
- Highest team total: 296 for 5 (50 overs) by Guyana v Leeward Islands, 1995–96
- Lowest team total: 18 all out (14.3 overs) by West Indies under-19s v Barbados, 2007–08
- Highest individual innings: 104 by Carl Hooper for Guyana v Leeward Islands, 1995–96
- Best bowling in an innings: 7-11 by Pedro Collins for Barbados v West Indies under-19s

== See also ==
- List of cricket grounds in the West Indies
