= Kayman Sankar =

Member of the National Assembly of Guyana
- In office 1986–1992
- Preceded by: Bissoondai Beniprashad-Rayman

Personal details
- Born: 3 June 1926 Cornelia Ida, British Guiana
- Died: 11 February 2014 (aged 87) Hamptoncourtpolder, Guyana
- Party: People's National Congress

Kayman Sankar (3 June 1926 – 11 February 2014) was a Guyanese businessman, philanthropist, and member of parliament. He helped to establish the rice industry on the Essequibo coast, and rose from a labourer to "Guyana’s most successful rice farmer".

Sankar was born at Cornelia Ida, on the western bank of the Demerara River (in what was then British Guiana, but is now in Guyana's Essequibo Islands-West Demerara region). He was the oldest of five children born to Dukhnee and Sewsankar Boodhoo, both of East Indian extraction. Owing to his family's poverty and his mother's illness, he discontinued his education at the age of nine, initially selling milk and later working as a labourer on the sugarcane fields at Cornelia Ida, where his jobs included weeding, cutting, loading, and manually fertilising the fields with manure. Nicknamed "Polo" as a young man for a perceived resemblance to actor Eddie Polo, Sankar eventually saved enough to purchase two acres at Windsor Forest, having supplemented his income by making jewellery and driving a taxi. By 1956, he was farming on Essequibo's Atlantic coast, at Bounty Hall, Dunkeld, and Perth (all now in the Pomeroon-Supenaam region). Sankar subsequently went into partnership with his brother and nephew, purchasing uncleared land between Dunkeld and Perth. He had earlier travelled as far west as the Pomeroon River, searching for land suitable for rice cultivation.

Despite initial failures, in 1966 Sankar was able to purchase 1,556 acres (6.30 km^{2}) at Hamptoncourtpolder with his first rice crop harvested two years later. The land was expanded further in 1975, when Kayman Sankar & Co. Ltd. (KSC) was first registered, with rice mills, a rice sheller, and a length grader installed in 1984. The Hampton Court facility was later further expanded to include drying facilities (replacing the earlier method of sun-drying), and increased storage, with Sankar eventually becoming Guyana's largest miller, exporting rice to other Caribbean countries and the European Union. He later expanded his business interests beyond rice, with KSC and another company, Kayman Sankar Investments Ltd. (KSIL) eventually combining to form the Kayman Sankar Group of Companies (KSG). In 1986, Sankar was nominated to sit in Guyana's National Assembly as a member of the People's National Congress (PNC), filling a casual vacancy left by Bissoondai Beniprashad-Rayman. He served until the 1992 election (which he did not contest), and was known as an advocate for the interests of rice farmers and other agricultural workers.

A keen cricket enthusiast, Sankar was the inaugural president of the Essequibo Cricket Board, an affiliate of the Guyana Cricket Board. He sponsored local players and tournaments, and also established the Kayman Sankar Cricket Ground in Hampton Court, which often hosted the Essequibo cricket team and also several matches for the Guyanese national side. He was a noted philanthropist, and often helped poorer workers fund marriage ceremonies and funerals. Sankar died at his Hampton Court residence in February 2014, aged 87. He and his wife, Seraji (née Ramnauth, known as Mavis or Mae), had wed in Cornelia Ida in January 1945, when he was 17 and she was 13, in a coupling arranged by Seraji's aunt. The couple, who lived apart for the first two years of their marriage, had two daughters, Sita and Sattie, and a son, Beni, who played first-class cricket for Essequibo and later took over the running of KSG. Sankar was a devout Sanātanī Hindu throughout his life, and paid for several overseas swamis to visit Guyana.

== See also ==
- Rice production in Guyana
