= Rayon Thomas =

Guyanese cricketer

Personal information
- Full name: Rayon St Aubyn Thomas
- Born: 22 December 1981; Suddie, Guyana
- Batting: Right-handed
- Bowling: Right-arm fast-medium
- Role: Bowler

Domestic team information
- Years: Team
- 2003: West Indies B
- 2004–2005: Guyana
- Source: CricketArchive, 19 November 2016

Rayon St Aubyn Thomas (born 22 December 1981) is a former Guyanese cricketer who represented Guyana and West Indies B in West Indian domestic cricket. He played as a right-arm fast bowler.

Thomas was born in Suddie, a small town on Guyana's Atlantic coast. He is one of the few players from the Essequibo region to have played for Guyana. In 2001, Thomas was selected to tour England with the West Indies under-19 team. He played a single ODI against the England under-19s, taking 3/41 from nine overs (including the wickets of future England internationals Ian Bell and Chris Tremlett).

In April 2002, Thomas was selected for a GCB President's XI against the touring Indians, which was his inaugural first-class appearance. For the 2002–03 Carib Beer Cup, he was included in the squad of West Indies B, an under-23 development side. He finished the season with eleven wickets from six matches, including 4/69 against Guyana and 3/72 against Trinidad and Tobago. Thomas was contracted to Guyana for the 2003–04 and 2004–05 seasons, but in four first-class appearances took just two wickets. He never represented for Guyana in limited-overs cricket.
