= Damodar Daesrath =

Guyanese cricketer

Personal information
- Born: 4 July 1981 (age 45); Cumberland, Guyana
- Batting: Right-handed
- Bowling: Right-arm medium
- Role: All-rounder

International information
- National side: Canada (2012–2013)
- ODI debut (cap 78): 11 July 2012 v Scotland
- Last ODI: 29 August 2013 v Netherlands
- Only T20I (cap 40): 16 November 2013 v Ireland

Domestic team information
- Years: Team
- 2002–2005: Guyana (West Indies)
- Source: ESPN cricinfo, 30 April 2020

Damodar Daesrath (born 4 July 1981) is a former international cricketer who played at One Day International (ODI) and Twenty20 International level for the Canadian national team. Prior to immigrating to Canada, he represented Guyana in West Indian domestic cricket.

Daesrath was born in Cumberland Village, in Guyana's East Berbice-Corentyne region making him one of only two Guyanese cricketers to be born in that region of Guyana the other being Shimron Hetmyer. A former Guyana under-19s player, he made his first-class debut in April 2002, playing for a GCB President's XI against the touring Indians. Daesrath's senior debut for Guyana came in the 2003–04 Carib Beer Cup. He scored 56 runs against West Indies B in his third game of the competition, and added another half-century in the semi-final against Barbados. During the 2004–05 Carib Beer Cup, Daesrath was appointed interim captain of Guyana while Shivnarine Chanderpaul was playing for the West Indies, captaining the team in the tournament's first five matches. In the first match after Chanderpaul's return, against Trinidad and Tobago, he took a five-wicket haul, 5/34.

Despite his brief period as captain, the 2004–05 season was Daesrath's last for Guyana. He continued playing club cricket after emigrating to Canada, and eventually qualified to play for the Canadian national team, making his senior debut in an ODI against Scotland in July 2012. Daesrath played three further ODIs the following year – one against Kenya and two against the Netherlands, all part of the World Cricket League Championship. He also represented Canada in the 2013 World Twenty20 Qualifier, playing a single Twenty20 International against Ireland. In an Intercontinental Cup fixture against the United Arab Emirates in August 2013, Daesrath scored his only first-class century, 111 runs from 104 balls (including 16 fours and three sixes).
