= List of international cricket centuries by Shivnarine Chanderpaul =

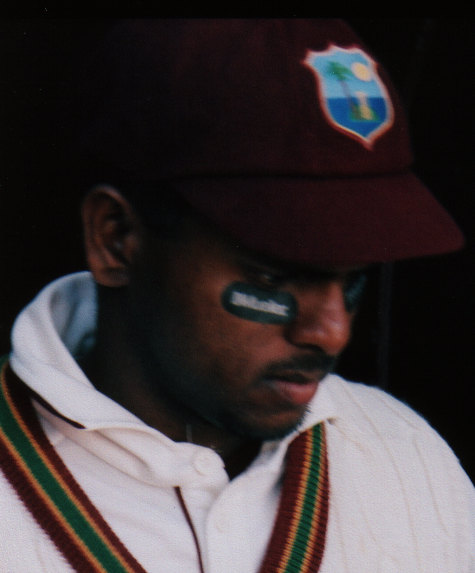
Chanderpaul is second only to Brian Lara in terms of number of international centuries for the West Indies.

Shivnarine Chanderpaul is an international cricketer who has played for the West Indies since 1994, and captained the team for a short time. He has scored centuries (100 or more runs in a single innings) on 30 occasions in Test cricket and 11 times in One Day International (ODI) matches. He is West Indies' second-most prolific batsman in international cricket, after Brian Lara, having accumulated almost 20,000 runs. He bats with an unorthodox technique, which is often described as "crab-like", and is highly regarded for his "patience and obstinacy at the crease." In his list of the 100 greatest Test players, Shane Warne described Chanderpaul as "a bloke you needed to crowbar away from the crease." In 2008 he was named as one of the five Cricketers of the Year by the Wisden Cricketers' Almanack, and as the Player of the Year by the International Cricket Council.

Chanderpaul made his Test debut in March 1994, selected as an all-rounder who could bowl leg breaks, against England. He reached his first century three years later, scoring an unbeaten 137 against India at the Kensington Oval in Bridgetown. During the initial phase of his career, Chanderpaul was criticised for his inability to convert half-centuries into centuries, but he proved his critics wrong during the 2001–02 series against India when he scored three centuries in five matches, thus earning the man of the series accolade. During that tournament, he batted for 1,513 minutes between dismissals, a record in Test cricket. Despite being well known for his patient batting, Chanderpaul scored a 69-ball century against Australia in 2003, which at the time was the third fastest century in terms of balls faced. (Note: As of September 2019, it is the sixth fastest century in Test cricket.) His highest score in Test cricket is 203 not out, a total he achieved twice, first against South Africa in 2005, and then against Bangladesh in 2012. He has scored centuries against every Test playing nation with the exception of Sri Lanka, and has scored seven centuries against India, more than any other team.

In ODI cricket, Chanderpaul's debut came seven months after his first Test appearance, but he was not required to bat as the West Indies reached the target to beat India. He scored his maiden ODI century shortly after his first Test century, in May 1997 against India, scoring 109 runs. He reached his highest ODI score in 1999, making 150 runs during a West Indian record partnership of 226 with Carl Hooper, against South Africa. That innings, along with his score of 149 not out against India in 2007 are the only times he has finished a century innings with a strike rate of quicker than a-run-a-ball in ODI cricket.

In both Test and ODI cricket, Chanderpaul has remained not out more often than being dismissed once he has scored a century: in Tests, he has been not out in 18 of 30 innings, while out of eleven ODI centuries, he was unbeaten eight times. Chanderpaul has not been selected to play Twenty20 International cricket since 2010, and in his 22 appearances prior to that, his highest score was 41 runs. As of February 2015, he is tenth among all-time century makers in international cricket.

== Key ==
- * – Remained not out
- ^{M} – Man of the match
- ‡ – He was the Captain of the West Indies team in that match.

== Tests ==
Centuries in Test cricket
No.	Score	Against	Pos.	Inn.	Test	Venue	H/A	Date	Result	Ref
1	137* ^{M}	India	3	1	3/5	Kensington Oval, Bridgetown	Home	27 March 1997	Won	
2	118 ^{M}	England	4	1	4/6	Bourda, Georgetown	Home	27 February 1998	Won	
3	140	India	6	1	1/5	Bourda, Georgetown	Home	11 April 2002	Drawn	
4	101*	India	6	2	3/5	Kensington Oval, Bridgetown	Home	2 May 2002	Won	
5	136*	India	6	2	4/5	Antigua Recreation Ground, St. John's	Home	10 May 2002	Drawn	
6	140	India	5	2	3/3	Eden Gardens, Kolkata	Away	30 October 2002	Drawn	
7	100	Australia	6	1	1/4	Bourda, Georgetown	Home	10 April 2003	Lost	
8	104 ^{M}	Australia	6	4	4/4	Antigua Recreation Ground, St. John's	Home	9 May 2003	Won	
9	109	South Africa	7	3	2/4	Kingsmead, Durban	Away	26 December 2003	Lost	
10	101*	Bangladesh	6	2	2/2	Sabina Park, Kingston	Home	4 June 2004	Won	
11	128*	England	5	2	1/4	Lord's, London	Away	22 July 2004	Lost	
12	203* ‡ ^{M}	South Africa	5	1	1/4	Bourda, Georgetown	Home	31 March 2005	Drawn	
13	127 ‡	South Africa	5	2	4/4	Antigua Recreation Ground, St. John's	Home	29 April 2005	Drawn	
14	153* ‡ ^{M}	Pakistan	5	3	1/2	Kensington Oval, Bridgetown	Home	26 May 2005	Won	
15	116*	England	5	4	3/4	Old Trafford, Manchester	Away	7 June 2007	Lost	
16	136* ^{M}	England	5	1	4/4	Riverside Ground, Chester-le-Street	Away	15 June 2007	Lost	
17	104	South Africa	5	1	1/3	St George's Park, Port Elizabeth	Away	26 December 2007	Won	
18	118	Australia	5	2	1/3	Sabina Park, Kingston	Home	22 May 2008	Lost	
19	107* ^{M}	Australia	5	2	2/3	Sir Vivian Richards Stadium, North Sound	Home	30 May 2008	Drawn	
20	126*	New Zealand	5	1	2/2	McLean Park, Napier	Away	19 December 2008	Drawn	
21	147*	England	6	2	5/5	Queen's Park Oval, Port of Spain	Home	6 March 2009	Drawn	
22	166 ^{M}	South Africa	4	2	2/3	Warner Park, Basseterre	Home	18 June 2010	Drawn	
23	116* ^{M}	India	5	3	3/3	Windsor Park, Roseau	Home	6 July 2011	Drawn	
24	118	India	5	1	1/3	Feroz Shah Kotla, Delhi	Away	6 November 2011	Lost	
25	103*	Australia	5	1	1/3	Kensington Oval, Bridgetown	Home	7 April 2012	Lost	
26	203*	Bangladesh	5	1	1/2	Sher-e-Bangla National Cricket Stadium, Mirpur	Away	13 November 2012	Won	
27	150*	Bangladesh	5	2	2/2	Sheikh Abu Naser Stadium, Khulna	Away	21 November 2012	Won	
28	108	Zimbabwe	5	2	2/2	Windsor Park, Roseau	Home	20 March 2013	Won	
29	122*	New Zealand	5	1	3/3	Seddon Park, Hamilton	Away	19 December 2013	Lost	
30	101*	Bangladesh	5	3	2/2	Beausejour Stadium, Gros Islet	Home	16 September 2014	Won	

== One Day Internationals ==
Centuries in One Day Internationals
No.	Score	Against	Pos.	Inn.	S/R	Venue	H/A/N	Date	Result	Ref
1	109* ^{M}	India	2	2	81.34	Kensington Oval, Bridgetown	Home	3 May 1997	Won	
2	150 ^{M}	South Africa	2	1	110.29	Buffalo Park, East London	Away	24 January 1999	Won	
3	108* ^{M}	New Zealand	2	2	78.26	Beausejour Stadium, Gros Islet	Home	8 June 2002	Won	
4	101	Pakistan	2	1	71.12	National Stadium, Karachi	Away	16 December 2006	Won	
5	149* ^{M}	India	2	2	109.55	Vidarbha Cricket Association Ground, Nagpur	Away	21 January 2007	Lost	
6	102* ^{M}	Ireland	2	2	90.26	Sabina Park, Kingston	Home	23 March 2007	Won	
7	116* ^{M}	England	3	1	95.08	Edgbaston, Birmingham	Away	4 July 2007	Won	
8	127*	Zimbabwe	3	2	92.02	Harare Sports Club	Away	30 November 2007	Lost	
9	107*	Pakistan	4	2	71.81	Sheikh Zayed Stadium, Abu Dhabi	Neutral	14 November 2008	Lost	
10	112* ^{M}	England	4	1	83.58	Providence Stadium	Home	22 March 2009	Won	
11	101 ^{M}	Canada	2	1	84.16	Sabina Park, Kingston	Home	13 April 2010	Won	

== Notes and references ==
Notes
