= Rice production in Guyana =

Guyana rice production

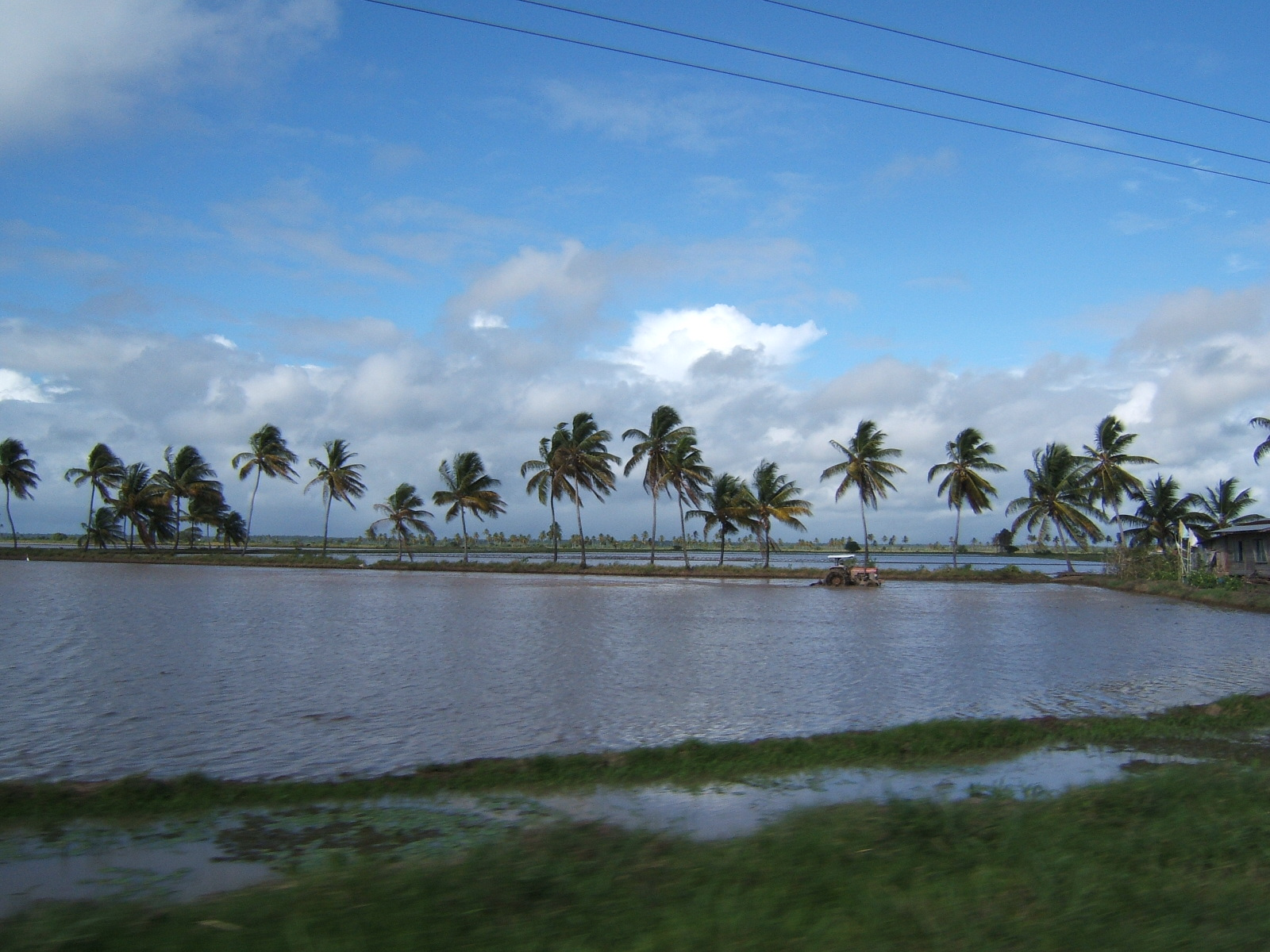
A tractor on a rice field in Guyana.

Rice production in Guyana is an important foodstuff of domestic consumption and one of Guyana's major export commodities.

Venezuela is the largest importer of Guyana's rice. Rice is also exported to Caribbean countries such as Trinidad and Tobago, and to Europe.

Exports (in Thousand Metric Tons)
2015	2016	2017	2018	2019	2020	2021 (est.)
486	431	455	414	496	520	530

== History ==
=== Introduced ===
Rice was first introduced in 1738 by the Dutch Governor of Essequibo, Laurens Storm van 's Gravesande, to feed slaves on the sugar estates. The demand for rice increased with the arrival of indentured workers from India, and after their indenture contract ended, many acquired plots of land and used it for rice cultivation. By 1896 production exceeded local consumption, leading to the first export shipment of rice to Trinidad.

International exports were hampered by the Great War, so Guyana focused on regional trading partners. In 1939 a single marketing organisation for rice was established and by the end of the Second World War Guyana had secured a virtual monopoly of the West Indies market. From 1946 to 1950, average production was 61,181 tons of paddy, 22,991 tons of exports. In 1946 two major trade organizations were formed, the British Guiana Rice Producers Association, and the British Guiana Rice Marketing Board for buying and selling all rice produced in the colony. By 1956 Guyana had been labeled the ‘bread basket of the Caribbean’ and by the time of independence in 1966 paddy production had reached 167,600 tons.

=== Nationalization ===
After independence from British colonial rule, policies for self-sufficiency were enacted. Rice was deemed Guyana's main home-grown staple, and wheat, which had to be imported, was banned along with other foods that Guyanese had grown accustomed to. These policies were extremely controversial, nonetheless, attempts were made to create rice products to emulate items made from wheat.

Most rice farms in Guyana were privately owned; the government operated the irrigation systems and rice-processing mills, with the notable exception of Kayman Sankar, whose plantations at Hampton Court polder (on Essequibo's Atlantic coast) included milling, shelling, grading, drying, and storage facilities. This division of the industry resulted in several difficulties. According to the US Embassy, the government neglected irrigation and drainage canals because private farmers refused to pay taxes for their maintenance. Meanwhile, the government-run mills were reportedly slow in paying farmers for their crops. There were also reports of inefficiencies in the government-controlled distribution system for tractors, fuel, spare parts, and fertilizer.

Exports took on increasing importance during the 1980s as a source of foreign exchange; there were even reports of rice being smuggled out of the country. Guyana shared a quota for rice exports to the EEC with neighboring Suriname but was unable to fill the quota during the late 1980s. Production reached a high of over 180,000 tons in 1984 but declined to a low of 130,000 tons in 1988 as a result of disease and inconsistent weather. Droughts and heavy rains had an adverse effect on rice crops because the irrigation and drainage systems in rice-growing areas were poorly maintained. The area under rice cultivation fell from 100,000 hectares in 1964 to 36,000 hectares in 1988, according to the Guyana Rice Producers' Association.

In 1988 the government set a 1991 production goal of 240,000 tons and an export goal of 100,000 tons. In the first quarter of 1990, however, exports fell to a record low of 16,000 tons, for an annual rate of less than 70,000 tons. Half of these exports came directly from private farmers, the other half from the Guyana Rice Milling and Marketing. In 1990 the government began privatizing the rice industry by putting several rice mills up for sale.

=== Since the 2000s ===
The annual rice production target for 2013 was 412,000 tonnes. Reports in October 2013 indicate that this will be exceeded despite a very wet August and a high infestation of paddy bugs which had caused some damage to the first crop. Dr. Leslie Ramsammy, the Minister of Agriculture has indicated that the local rice industry will surpass the 500,000-tonne mark and Mr. Dharamkumar Seeraj, the General Secretary of the RPA, is reported as saying that the weather conditions were ideal for harvesting and as such, the rice harvest was proceeding smoothly in all rice producing areas of Guyana.

The country produced more than 1 million tons of paddy in 2019. In seeking to develop more value-added agricultural products and enhance utilization, Guyana has taken an interest in products that integrate rice.

== See also ==
- Agriculture in Guyana
- Caribbean cuisine
- List of rice dishes
- Water supply and sanitation in Guyana
