= Essequibo cricket team =

The Essequibo cricket team, representing the former county of Essequibo on the western shore of the Essequibo River estuary in Guyana, has played cricket in Guyana since the 1950s. It played one first-class match in the 1980–81 season.

The Jones Cup (later known as the Guystac Trophy amongst other names) has been contested by Berbice, Demerara and Essequibo since 1954–55. Each season the holder of the trophy would play the winner of a semi-final between the other two teams. If the final was drawn, the trophy stayed with the defending side. From 1971–72 to 1989–90 the final had first-class status.

In every season but one the final was between Berbice and Demerara. The exception was in 1980–81 when Essequibo won through to play Berbice in the final. The match was played in Essequibo, at Kayman Sankar Cricket Ground, Hampton Court, just north of the town of Anna Regina. Essequibo batted first and made 152 and 163; Berbice scored 276 and 43 for 1 to win by nine wickets. For all 11 Essequibo players it was their only first-class match.

== Notable players ==
The following players either played in Essequibo's one and only first-class match, or played inter-county matches for Essequibo and first-class matches for another team or teams. Courtney Gonsalves was the only Essequibo player from their 1980–81 team to go on to play for Guyana, which he did in two matches of List A cricket.

- Lennox Alves (Essequibo)
- Ronsford Beaton (Guyana, West Indies A, Amazon Warriors)
- Troy Cornelius (Guyana)
- Patrick Evans (Essequibo)
- Fitz Garraway (Essequibo)
- Trevon Garraway (Guyana)
- Courtney Gonsalves (Essequibo, Guyana)
- Jeff Jones (Essequibo)
- Alfred Maycock (Essequibo)
- Kamroze Mohammed (Essequibo)
- Birchmore Reid (Essequibo)
- Beni Sankar (Essequibo)
- Egbert Stephens (Essequibo)
- Rayon Thomas (Guyana, West Indies B)
- Malcolm Williams (Essequibo)
