= Guyana Cricket Board =

Ruling body for cricket in Guyana

The Guyana Cricket Board is the ruling body for cricket in Guyana.

== Guyana Cricket Board regions ==
The Guyana Cricket Board has regions who play cricket in the country. Below is the history of the regions of certain cricket boards in the country. And also some programs in the country as well.

=== Berbice Cricket Board ===
The Berbice cricket team played first class cricket in the Guystac Trophy and against the occasional touring team during the 20th century. The team came from the Dutch colony of Berbice, which is now a county of Guyana.

They played their inaugural first class match in March 1960 against the touring Marylebone Cricket Club from England. Berbice were captained by Joe Solomon who opened the batting and scored 201 not out which remained his highest first class score. Other notable players in the side included Basil Butcher who also scored a century, and Rohan Kanhai. In March 1961 they played a draw against EW Swanton's XI and didn't play a first class match again for another decade.

During the 1970s and 80s the team played a match every season, bar one, against Demerara, with both sides playing for the Jones Cup and later the Guystac Trophy. The first match took place in October 1971 with Basil Butcher as captain. They played annually (except in 1980/81) until 1989 when they played each other for the final time. In 1980/81, Essequibo qualified for the Jones Cup final instead of Demerara. The inter-county tournament continued after 1989/90, but none of the matches were considered first class.

Berbice won the Trophy in 1976/77, 1977/78 and 1980/81.

The first player from Berbice to play test cricket for the West Indies was John Trim, the fast bowler.

=== Demerara Cricket Board ===
The Demerara cricket team played first class cricket in the Jones Cup, later the Guystac Trophy, and came from the former British colony of Demerara, which is now a county of Guyana, formerly British Guiana. The other counties are Berbice and Essequibo.

They are credited as playing in the inaugural first class cricket match in the West Indies with a game against Barbados in 1865.

Demerara were winners of the Jones Cup in 1972/73, and the Guystac Trophy in 1984/85, 1985/86 and 1989/90. Cricketers who have played for them include Shivnarine Chanderpaul, Lance Gibbs, Roger Harper, Carl Hooper and Ramnaresh Sarwan. The Jones Cup was the inter-county tournament in Guyana for many years until the name was changed to that of the new sponsors of the competition, Guystac. The final, only, was a first class match during the 1970s and 1980s.

The name Demerara was often used when referring to the whole of British Guiana in the nineteenth and early twentieth centuries, resulting in some confusion for students of cricket history. Before the 1950s, it was very unusual for a player from Berbice or Essequibo to be selected to play for British Guiana.

=== Essequibo Cricket Board ===
The inaugural president of the ECB was rice magnate Kayman Sankar, who established the Kayman Sankar Cricket Ground at Hampton Court with his own money. The Essequibo cricket team, historically the weakest of the three county sides, often played matches there, and appeared in the final of the 1980–81 Jones Cup inter-county competition, which was accorded first-class status.

=== The Guyana Blind Cricket Association ===
The Organization was initiated by the Caribbean Council for the Blind/Eye Care Guyana with the ultimate aim of having the blind and visually impaired involved in normal life of society, through activities, which would help to build their confidence and self-esteem. The Guyana Blind Cricket Association (GUYBCA) was launched on 31 March 2006. To become a member of the West Indies Cricket Council for the Blind of which Barbados, Jamaica, Windward Islands and Trinidad & Tobago were already members, Guyana had to host two countries and involve them in a Blind Cricket Match.

Two Cricket Coaches in the likes of Bharat Mangru of the Guyana Police Force and Roderick Lovell of the Guyana Defence Force were permitted by their respective Organizations to participate in the coaching clinic in Trinidad & Tobago.

Guyana sent a National team to Barbados in July 2006 to participate in the first regional Blind Cricket Competition, even though Guyana placed last, the performance of the team members were commendable, hence three of the players were selected to the West Indies Blind Cricket Team to participate in the Blind Cricket World Cup Competition in Pakistan in December 2006, they were Ganesh Singh, Oliver Kerr and Patrick Dillon, Bharat Mangru was also selected Coach for the West Indies team.

In 2008 Guyana held a coaching clinic and trained five conventional cricket coaches in Guyana and also Anthony Gray of T&T, two trained British Coaches conducted this five day program. In 2007, the completion was held in Jamaica, but due to financial constraints Guyana was unable to participate, and in 2008 the completion was held in T&T where Guyana placed third, two of our players were also selected to the West Indies Team to tour England in 2008 but again due to Financial constraints they were not able to travel with the team. In 2009 Ms. Theresa Pemberton, treasure of GUYBCA was elected Treasurer of the West Indies Cricket Council for the Blind and Mr. Ganesh was appointed Director, in 2009 Guyana also losing to Barbados, T&T and Jamaica. (The players for the National Team came from Linden, East Coast, West Demerara, East Bank and Georgetown)

Between 2008 and 2010, members of the executive and visually impaired cricketers associated with the organization participated in workshops, seminars, and leadership programmes funded by VSO and the Guyana Blind Youth and Cricket Association (GUYBCA). During this period, two players completed training in the JAWS screen-reading computer programme for blind users. The organization's development programme expanded cricket activities to Regions 2 (Bartica), 5 and 6 (Berbice), and 7 (Essequibo), resulting in participation from players representing those regions. Preparations were also undertaken for the fifth regional competition for visually impaired cricketers, held in Barbados from 4 to 10 June 2010. According to reports from the period, the Guyana Cricket Board noted the progress of the GUYBCA and its development initiatives.
