= List of List A cricket records =

This is a list of List A cricket records; that is, world-record team and individual performances in List A cricket.

== Listing criteria ==
In general, the top five are listed in each category, except when there is a tie for the last place among the five, when all the tied record holders are noted.

== Listing notation ==
Team notation

- (200/3) indicates that a team scored 200 runs for three wickets and the innings was closed, either due to a successful run chase or if no playing time remained
- (200) indicates that a team scored 200 runs and was all out

Batting notation

- (100) indicates that a batsman scored 100 runs and was out
- (100*) indicates that a batsman scored 100 runs and was not out

Bowling notation

- (5/20) indicates that a bowler has captured five wickets while conceding 20 runs

Currently playing

- † indicates a current cricketer

Start Date

- indicates the date the match was played

== Batting records ==
=== Most runs in a career ===
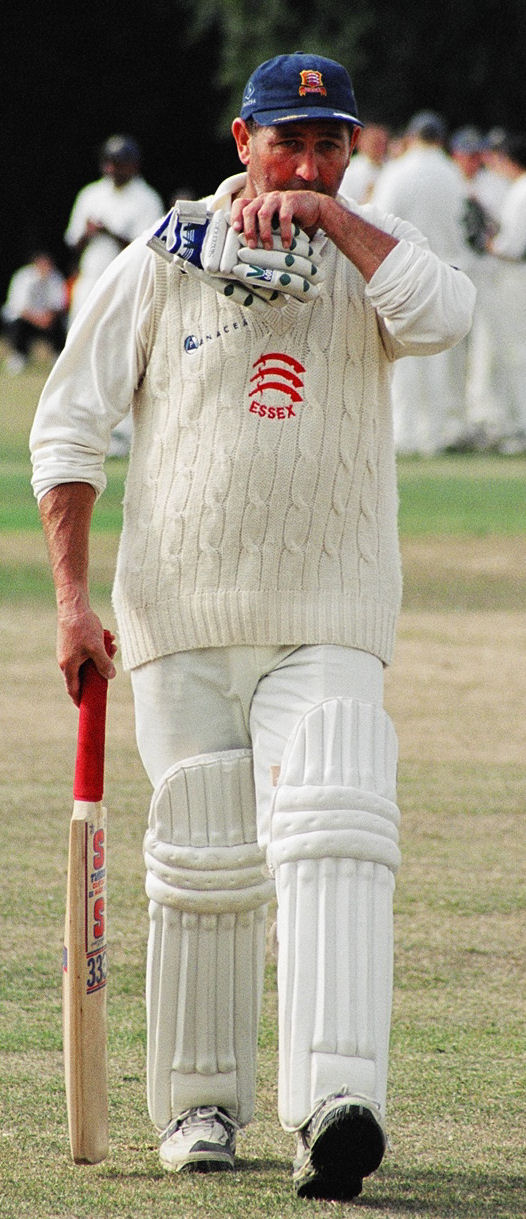
All-time leading run scorer Graham Gooch

Rank	Runs	Innings	Player	Nationality	Average	100s	50s	Span
1	22,211	601	Graham Gooch	England	40.16	44	139	1973–1997
2	22,059	630	Graeme Hick	England / Zimbabwe	41.30	40	139	1983–2008
3	21,999	538	Sachin Tendulkar	India	45.54	60	114	1989–2012
4	19,456	501	Kumar Sangakkara	Sri Lanka	43.52	39	120	1997–2020
5	16,995	466	Viv Richards	Antigua and Barbuda	41.96	26	109	1973–1993
6	16,447	347	Virat Kohli†	India	57.91	60	86	2006-2026
7	16,363	445	Ricky Ponting	Australia	41.74	34	99	1992-2013
8	16,349	436	Gordon Greenidge	Barbados	40.56	33	94	1970-1992
9	16,128	542	Sanath Jayasuriya	Sri Lanka	31.19	31	82	1989-2011
10	15,658	463	Allan Lamb	England	39.14	19	98	1972-1995
Source: ESPN Cricinfo Last updated: 11 July 2026

=== Most centuries in a career ===
Rank	Centuries	Innings	Player	Nationality	Runs	Span
1	60	338	Virat Kohli†	India	16,730	2006–2026
1	60	538	Sachin Tendulkar	India	21,999	1989–2012
3	44	601	Graham Gooch	England	22,211	1973–1997
4	40	630	Graeme Hick	England / Zimbabwe	22,059	1983–2008
5	39	501	Kumar Sangakkara	Sri Lanka	19,456	1997–2020
6	38	350	Rohit Sharma†	India	15,324	2006–2026
7	34	445	Ricky Ponting	Australia	16,363	1992–2013
8	33	436	Gordon Greenidge	Barbados	16,349	1970–1992
9	31	207	Babar Azam†	Pakistan	9,772	2010–2026
9	31	268	Martin Guptill	New Zealand	10,444	2006–2024
9	31	421	Sourav Ganguly	India	15,622	1989–2012
9	31	542	Sanath Jayasuriya	Sri Lanka	16,128	1989–2011
Source: ESPNcricinfo Last updated: 27 September 2026

=== Most half centuries in a career ===
Rank	Half centuries	Innings	Player	Nationality	Span
1	139	601	Graham Gooch	England	1973–1997
1	139	630	Graeme Hick	England / Zimbabwe	1983–2008
3	120	501	Kumar Sangakkara	Sri Lanka	1997–2020
4	116	385	Michael Bevan	Australia	1989–2006
5	114	538	Sachin Tendulkar	India	1989–2012
6	112	416	Rahul Dravid	India	1992-2011
7	110	416	Desmond Haynes	Barbados	1977-1997
8	109	406	Jacques Kallis	South Africa	1994-2014
8	109	466	Sir Viv Richards	Antigua and Barbuda	1973-1993
10	107	472	Neil Fairbrother	England	1982-2002
Source: ESPN Cricinfo Last updated: 23 December 2019

=== Most 50+ scores in career ===
Rank	50+ scores	Innings	Player	Nationality	Centuries	Half centuries	Span
1	183	601	Graham Gooch	England	44	139	1973–1997
2	179	630	Graeme Hick	England / Zimbabwe	40	139	1983–2008
3	174	538	Sachin Tendulkar	India	60	114	1989–2012
4	159	501	Kumar Sangakkara	Sri Lanka	39	120	1997–2020
5	145	347	Virat Kohli†	India	59	86	2006–2025
6	138	416	Desmond Haynes	West Indies	28	110	1977–1997
7	135	466	Viv Richards	West Indies	26	109	1973–1993
8	133	416	Rahul Dravid	India	21	112	1992–2011
8	133	445	Ricky Ponting	Australia	34	99	1992–2013
10	132	406	Jacques Kallis	South Africa	23	109	1994–2014
Source: ESPNcricinfo Last updated: 11 July 2026

=== Highest individual scores ===
Rank	Score	Player	Nationality	Match Date
1	277	Narayan Jagadeesan	India	21 November 2022
2	268	Ali Brown	England	19 June 2002
3	264	Rohit Sharma	India	13 November 2014
4	257	D'Arcy Short	Australia	28 September 2018
5	248	Shikhar Dhawan	India	12 August 2013
6	244	Prithvi Shaw	India	9 August 2023
7	237*	Martin Guptill	New Zealand	21 March 2015
8	230	Travis Head	Australia	13 October 2021
9	229*	Ben Dunk	Australia	18 October 2014
10	227*	Prithvi Shaw	India	25 February 2021
Source: ESPN Cricinfo Last updated: 9 August 2023

=== Highest average ===
Qualification: Minimum 50 innings

Rank	Average	Player	Nationality	Innings	Runs	Not Outs	100s	50s	Span
1	59.39	Ruturaj Gaikwad†	India	97	5,227	9	21	20	2017–2026
2	57.91	Virat Kohli†	India	334	16,447	50	59	86	2006–2026
3	57.86	Michael Bevan	Australia	385	15,103	124	13	116	1989–2006
4	57.76	Sam Hain	England	62	3,004	10	10	17	2013–2023
5	57.01	Cheteshwar Pujara	India	127	5,759	26	16	34	2006–2023
6	54.94	Darwish Rasooli†	Afghanistan	66	3,022	11	10	19	2017–2026
7	53.61	Prithvi Shaw†	India	71	3,592	4	10	16	2017–2026
8	53.52	Khurram Manzoor	Pakistan	165	7,922	17	27	39	2002–2022
9	53.47	AB de Villiers	South Africa	252	11,123	44	29	63	2003–2018
10	53.59	Babar Azam†	Pakistan	207	9,772	24	31	57	2010–2026
Source: ESPNcricinfo Last updated: 10 June 2026

=== Fastest 100 ===
Rank	Balls	Player	Team	Opposition	Venue	Date
1	29	(Australia) Jake Fraser-McGurk	South Australia	Tasmania	Adelaide	8 October 2023
2	31	(South Africa) AB de Villiers	South Africa	West Indies	Johannesburg	18 January 2015
3	32	(India) Sakibul Gani	Bihar	Arunachal Pradesh	Ranchi	24 December 2025
4	33	(India) Ishan Kishan	Jharkhand	Karnataka	Ahmedabad	24 December 2025
5	35	(India) Anmolpreet Singh	Punjab	Arunachal Pradesh	Ahmedabad	21 December 2024
6	36	(New Zealand) Corey Anderson	New Zealand	West Indies	Queenstown	1 January 2014
6	36	(England) Graham Rose	Somerset	Devon	Recreation Ground, Torquay	27 June 1990
Source: ESPNcricinfo.com, last updated 21 December 2024

=== Most runs in an over ===
Runs	Sequence	Batsman	Team	Bowler	Opposition Team	Venue	Season
43	4-(N+6)-(N+6)-6-1-6-6-6	Brett Hampton; Joe Carter	(New Zealand) Northern Districts	Willem Ludick	(New Zealand) Central Districts	Hamilton	2018–19
43	6-6-6-6-(N+6)-6-6	Ruturaj Gaikwad	(India) Maharashtra	Shiva Singh	(India) Uttar Pradesh	Sardar Patel Stadium B Ground, Ahmedabad	2022–23
39	(N+4)-W-6-4-6-4-6-W-6	Elton Chigumbura	(Bangladesh) Sheikh Jamal	Alauddin Babu	(Bangladesh) Abahani Ltd	Mirpur	2013–14
37	6-6-6-6-2-(N+4)-6	JP Duminy	(South Africa) Cape Cobras	Eddie Leie	(South Africa) Knights	Cape Town	2017–18
36	6–6–6–6–6–6	Herschelle Gibbs	South Africa	Daan van Bunge	Netherlands	St. Kitts	2006–07
36	6–6–6–6–6–6	Jaskaran Malhotra	United States	Gaudi Toka	Papua New Guinea	Al Amerat Cricket Stadium Turf 2	2021–22
36	6–6–6–6–6–6	Thisara Perera	(Sri Lanka) SL Army Sports Club	Dilhan Cooray	(Sri Lanka) BCAC	Army Ground, Panagoda	2020–21
Key: *N – No ball *W – Wide
Source: ESPNcricinfo, last updated 1 January 2023

== Record partnerships by wicket ==
Wicket	Runs	Batting partners	Team	Opposition	Venue	Date
1st	416	Narayan Jagadeesan and Sai Sudharsan	(India) Tamil Nadu	(India) Arunachal Pradesh	M Chinnaswamy Stadium, Bangalore	21 November 2022
2nd	372	Chris Gayle and Marlon Samuels	(Cricket West Indies) West Indies	Zimbabwe	Manuka Oval, Canberra	24 February 2015
3rd	338	Sanju Samson and Sachin Baby	(India) Kerala	(India) Goa	Alur Cricket Stadium II, Bangalore	12 October 2019
4th	276	Mominul Haque and Roshen Silva	(Bangladesh) Prime Doleshwar	(Bangladesh) Abahani Limited	Shaheed Chandu Stadium, Bogra	17 September 2013
5th	267*	Minhajul Abedin and Khaled Mahmud	Bangladesh	(Pakistan) Bahawalpur	United Bank Limited Sports Complex, Karachi	17 March 1998
6th	272	Aiden Markram and Farhaan Behardien	(South Africa) Titans	(South Africa) Cape Cobras	Newlands, Cape Town	1 March 2019
7th	215*	Simi Singh and George Dockrell	(Ireland) Leinster Lightning	(Ireland) Northern Knights	The Vineyard, Dublin	4 June 2018
8th	203	Shahid Iqbal and Haaris Ayaz	(Pakistan) Karachi Whites	(Pakistan) Hyderabad	United Bank Limited Sports Complex, Karachi	8 April 1999
9th	155	Chris Read and Andrew Harris	(England) Nottinghamshire	(England) Durham	Trent Bridge, Nottingham	11 June 2006
10th	128	Ashish Reddy and Ravi Kiran	(India) Hyderabad	(India) Kerala	Nuclear Fuel Complex Ground, Secunderabad	10 November 2014
Source: ESPN Cricinfo Last updated: 12 October 2019

== Bowling records ==
=== Most wickets ===
Rank	Wickets	Matches	Player	Nationality	Average	4-Wkts	5-Wkts	Span
1	881	594	Wasim Akram	Pakistan	21.91	34	12	1984–2003
2	684	458	Allan Donald	South Africa	21.84	27	11	1985–2004
3	682	453	Muttiah Muralitharan	Sri Lanka	22.39	17	12	1991–2011
4	674	481	John Lever	England	19.70	26	8	1968–1990
4	674	411	Waqar Younis	Pakistan	22.36	27	17	1988–2004
6	647	536	John Emburey	England	25.98	23	3	1975-2000
7	612	470	Ian Botham	England	24.94	15	3	1973-1993
8	598	420	Darren Gough	England	24.17	21	7	1990-2008
9	573	435	Shaun Pollock	South Africa	22.93	18	7	1992-2008
10	572	411	Derek Underwood	England	19.43	25	8	1963-1987
Source: ESPN Cricinfo Last updated: 5 December 2012

=== Most five wickets in an innings ===
Rank	5+ wickets	Matches	Player	Nationality	Wickets	Average	Career Span
1	17	411	Waqar Younis	Pakistan	674	22.37	1998–2004
2	12	158	Mitchell Starc†	Australia	320	22.02	2009–2024
2	12	453	Muttiah Muralitharan	Sri Lanka	682	22.39	1991–2011
2	12	594	Wasim Akram	Pakistan	881	22.91	1984–2003
5	11	501	Shahid Afridi	Pakistan	510	33.82	1995–2017
5	11	458	Allan Donald	South Africa	684	21.84	1985–2004
7	10	256	Joel Garner	Barbados	397	16.61	1976–1992
7	10	262	Brett Lee	Australia	438	24.05	1997–2012
7	10	291	Lasith Malinga	Sri Lanka	446	27.49	2001–2019
10	9	127	Sisanda Magala†	South Africa	193	26.95	2010–2023
10	9	260	James Kirtley	England	395	23.12	1995–2010
10	9	280	Abdur Razzak	Bangladesh	412	25.98	2001–2020
10	9	282	Franklyn Stephenson	Barbados	448	19.91	1981–1997
10	9	305	Ian Harvey	Australia	445	22.36	1993–2010
Source: ESPNcricinfo Last updated: 12 August 2025

=== Best bowling figures ===
Rank	Figures	Player	Nationality	Venue	Season
1	8/10	Shahbaz Nadeem	India	Chennai	2018–19
2	8/15	Rahul Sanghvi	India	Una	1997–98
3	8/19	Chaminda Vaas	Sri Lanka	Colombo (SSC)	2001–02
4	8/20	Tharaka Kottehewa	Sri Lanka	Colombo (Moors)	2007–08
5	8/21	Michael Holding	Jamaica	Hove	1988
6	8/26	Keith Boyce	Barbados	Old Trafford	1971
7	8/30	Romesh Eranga	Sri Lanka	Colombo (Colts)	2007–08
8	8/31	Derek Underwood	England	Edinburgh	1987
9	8/38	Brandon Mavuta	Zimbabwe	Harare	2017–18
10	8/40	Yeasin Arafat	Bangladesh	Fatullah	2017–18
Source: ESPNcricinfo Last updated: 12 August 2025

=== Best career bowling average ===
Rank	Bowling Average	Player	Nationality	Wickets	Runs Conceded	Balls	Period
1	16.05	Keith Boyce	West Indies	268	4,304	7,833	1967–1977
2	16.61	Joel Garner	West Indies	397	6,598	13,359	1976–1992
3	16.66	Dulanjana Mendis†	Sri Lanka	137	2,283	3,715	2009–2023
4	16.70	Dilum Sudeera†	Sri Lanka	132	2,205	3,319	2021-2025
5	16.80	Fred Rumsey	England	130	2,185	4,802	1963–1973
6	17.05	Tony Nicholson	England	173	2,951	5,862	1963–1975
7	17.50	John Sullivan	England	113	1,978	2,859	1963-1976
8	17.78	Chanaka Komasaru†	Sri Lanka	178	3,166	5,537	2001-2025
9	17.94	Peter Lever	England	272	4,882	9,258	1963-1983
10	18.06	Vince van der Bijl	South Africa	132	2,385	5,237	1969-1983
Qualification: 2,500 balls Source: ESPNcricinfo Last updated: 12 August 2025

=== Best career bowling strike rate ===
Rank	Bowling strike rate	Player	Nationality	Wickets	Runs Conceded	Balls	Period
1	23.1	Andrew Tye†	Australia	142	3,022	3,282	2013–2024
2	24.2	Matt Coles	England	139	3,243	3,364	2009–2019
3	25.1	Dilum Sudeera†	Sri Lanka	132	2,205	3,319	2021–2025
4	25.3	John Sullivan	England	113	1,978	2,859	1963–1976
5	25.4	Sadaf Hussain	Pakistan	139	3,029	3,531	2010–2019
6	25.4	Bilal Khan†	Oman	136	2,775	3,464	2008–2024
7	25.6	Mitchell Starc†	Australia	320	7,049	8,200	2009–2024
8	25.7	Adam Hollioake	England	352	8,186	9,074	1992–2004
9	25.8	Ajantha Mendis	Sri Lanka	287	5,586	7,413	2006–2019
10	26.1	Asitha Fernando†	Sri Lanka	136	2,962	3,550	2017–2025
10	26.1	Mohammed Shami†	India	268	6,396	7,002	2011–2025
Qualification: 2,500 balls Source: ESPNcricinfo Last updated: 12 August 2025

== Most games in a career ==
Rank	Games	Player	Nationality	Runs	Wickets	Career Span
1	651	Graeme Hick	England / Zimbabwe	22,059	225	1983–2008
2	613	Graham Gooch	England	22,211	310	1973–1997
3	594	Wasim Akram	Pakistan	6,993	881	1984–2003
4	557	Sanath Jayasuriya	Sri Lanka	16,128	413	1989–2011
5	551	Mike Gatting	England	14,476	175	1975–1998
5	551	Sachin Tendulkar	India	21,999	201	1989–2013
7	546	Mahela Jayawardene	Sri Lanka	15,421	24	1995–2016
8	536	John Emburey	England	3,865	647	1975–2000
9	529	Kumar Sangakkara	Sri Lanka	19,456	-	1997–2020
10	525	Kim Barnett	England	15,564	113	1979–2005
Source: ESPN Cricinfo Last updated: 2 November 2016

== Wicket-keeping records ==
=== Most dismissals in a career ===
Rank	Dismissals	Player	Nationality	Catches	Stumpings	Career Span
1	661	Steve Rhodes	England	532	129	1984–2004
2	642	Kumar Sangakkara	Sri Lanka	518	124	1997–2015
3	591	Adam Gilchrist	Australia	526	65	1992–2010
4	563	Jack Russell	England	465	98	1982–2004
5	543	MS Dhoni	India	392	141	1999–2019
6	527	Warren Hegg	England	466	61	1987–2005
7	520	Paul Nixon	England	421	99	1987–2011
8	515	Mark Boucher	South Africa	484	31	1995–2011
9	490	Alec Stewart	England	442	48	1981–2003
10	476	Moin Khan	Pakistan	337	139	1989–2005
Source: ESPN Cricinfo Last updated: 18 January 2019

=== Most catches in a career ===
Rank	Catches	Matches	Player	Nationality	Career Span
1	532	477	Steve Rhodes	England	1984–2004
2	526	356	Adam Gilchrist	Australia	1992–2010
3	518	529	Kumar Sangakkara	Sri Lanka	1997–2015
4	484	365	Mark Boucher	South Africa	1995–2011
5	466	409	Warren Hegg	England	1987–2005
6	465	479	Jack Russell	England	1982–2004
7	442	504	Alec Stewart	England	1981–2003
8	421	411	Paul Nixon	England	1987–2011
9	411	429	David Bairstow	England	1970-1990
10	402	423	MS Dhoni	India	1999–2019
Source: ESPN Cricinfo Last updated: 18 January 2019

=== Most stumpings in a career ===
Rank	Stumpings	Matches	Player	Nationality	Career Span
1	141	423	MS Dhoni	India	1999–2019
2	139	357	Moin Khan	Pakistan	1989-2005
3	129	477	Steve Rhodes	England	1984–2004
4	124	529	Kumar Sangakkara	Sri Lanka	1997–2015
5	99	411	Paul Nixon	England	1987–2011
6	98	479	Jack Russell	England	1982–2004
7	96	385	Mushfiqur Rahim†	Bangladesh	2004–2025
8	89	340	Kamran Akmal	Pakistan	1997–2019
9	87	251	Romesh Kaluwitharana	Sri Lanka	1990–2005
10	75	333	Bob Taylor	England	1963–1984
Source: ESPNcricinfo Last updated: 12 August 2025

== Highest team scores ==
Rank	Score	Team	Opponent	Venue	Date
1	574/6	(India) Bihar	(India) Arunachal Pradesh	Ranchi	24 December 2025
2	506/2	(India) Tamil Nadu	(India) Arunachal Pradesh	Bangalore	21 November 2022
3	498/4	England	Netherlands	Amstelveen	17 June 2022
4	496/4	(England) Surrey	(England) Gloucestershire	The Oval, London	29 April 2007
5	487/5	England Lions	(Cricket West Indies) West Indies A	Basseterre	9 November 2026
6	481/6	England	Australia	Trent Bridge, Nottingham	19 June 2018
7	458/4	India A	(England) Leicestershire	Leicester	19 June 2018
8	457/4	(India) Mumbai	(India) Puducherry	Sawai Mansingh Stadium, Jaipur	25 February 2021
9	454/3	(England) Gloucestershire	(England) Somerset	County Cricket Ground, Bristol	13 August 2023
10	453/3	(South Africa) Titans	(South Africa) North West	Centurion Park, Centurion	30 March 2022
Source: ESPN Cricinfo Last updated: 12 November 2026

== Lowest team scores ==
Only completed innings are listed:

Rank	Score	Team	Opponent	Venue	Date
1	18	(Cricket West Indies) West Indies U-19	Barbados	Blairmont Sports Club Ground	17 October 2007
2	19	(Sri Lanka) Saracens Sports Club	(Sri Lanka) Colts Cricket Club	Colombo (Colts)	13 December 2012
3	23	(England) Middlesex	(England) Yorkshire	Leeds	23 June 1974
4	24	Oman	Scotland	Al Amerat	19 February 2019
5	26	Nepal	India A	Doha	20 November 2026
6	30	(Bangladesh) Chittagong Division	(Bangladesh) Sylhet Division	Dhaka	27 December 2002
6	30	(Sri Lanka) Ace Capital Cricket Club	(Sri Lanka) Nondescripts Cricket Club	Colombo	28 March 2021
7	31	(South Africa) Border	(South Africa) South Western Districts	East London	28 October 2007
8	34	(India) Saurashtra	(India) Mumbai	Mumbai	2 January 2000
9	35	Zimbabwe	Sri Lanka	Fatullah	12 September 2013
9	35	(Bangladesh) Cricket Coaching School	(Bangladesh) Abahani Limited	Harare	25 April 2004
9	35	(India) Rajasthan	(India) Railways	Nagpur	11 November 2014
9	35	United States	Nepal	Kirtipur	12 February 2020
Source: ESPN Cricinfo Last updated: 28 March 2021

== Largest successful run chases ==
Over	Team	Opponent	Runs chased	Venue	Date
50	South Africa	Australia	438/9	Johannesburg	12 March 2006
40	(England) Kent	(England) Sussex	337/7	St Lawrence	19 June 2013
