= Alvin Kallicharran =

West Indian cricketer

Alvin Kallicharran BEM
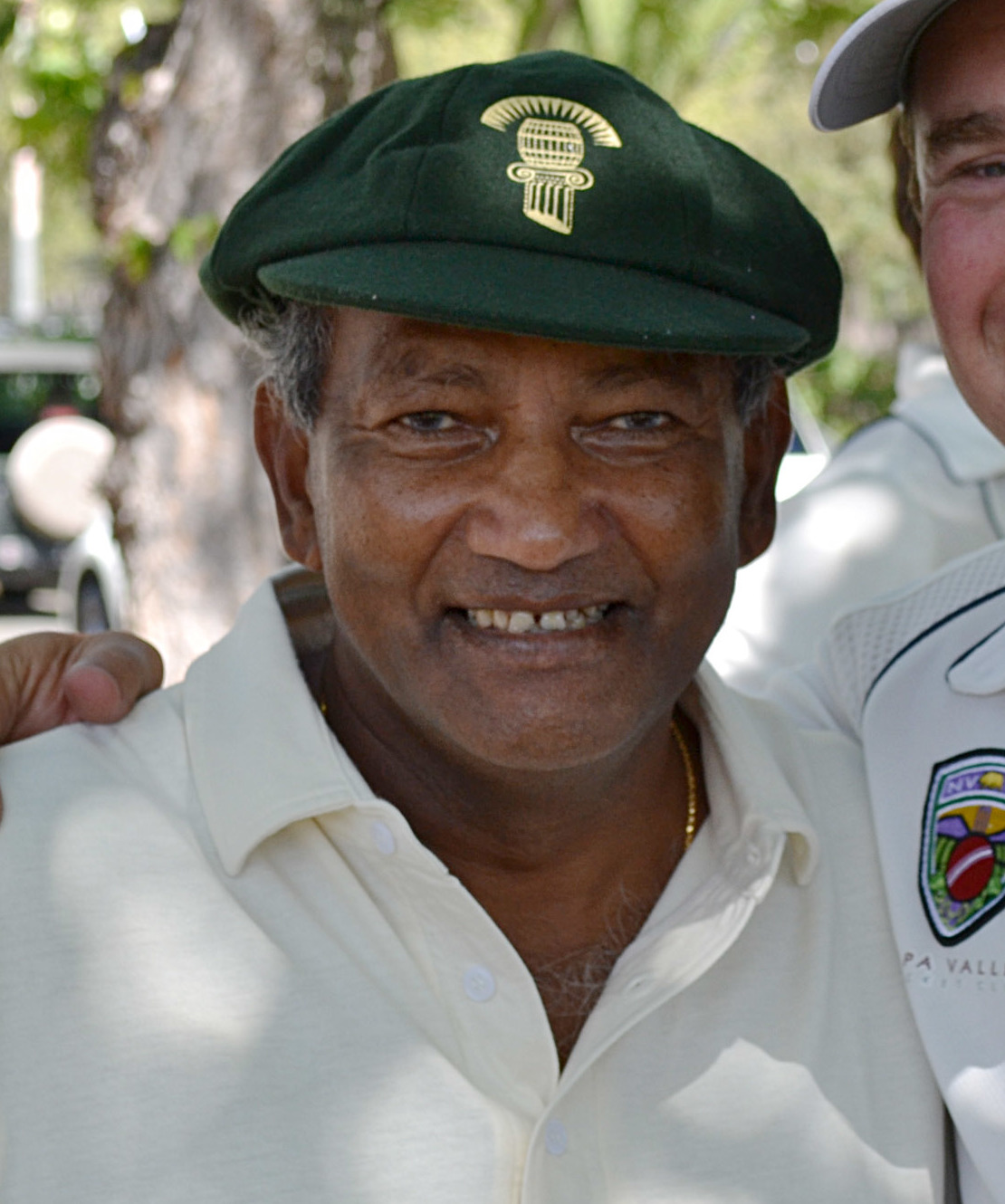
- Kallicharran in 2013

Personal information
- Full name: Alvin Isaac Kallicharran
- Born: 21 March 1949 (age 77); Port Mourant, British Guiana (now Guyana)
- Nickname: Kalli
- Height: 5 ft 4 in (163 cm)
- Batting: Left-handed
- Bowling: Right-arm off break
- Role: Batsman
- Relatives: Derek Kallicharran (brother); Mahendra Nagamootoo (nephew)
- Website: https://alvinkallicharran.com/

International information
- National side: West Indies (1972–1981)
- Test debut (cap 144): 6 April 1972 v New Zealand
- Last Test: 4 January 1981 v Pakistan
- ODI debut (cap 7): 5 September 1973 v England
- Last ODI: 4 February 1981 v England

Domestic team information
- Years: Team
- 1966/67–1980/81: Guyana
- 1971–1990: Warwickshire
- 1972/73–1973/74: Berbice
- 1977/78: Queensland
- 1981/82–1983/84: Transvaal
- 1984/85–1987/88: Orange Free State

Career statistics
Competition	Test	ODI	FC	LA
Matches	66	31	505	383
Runs scored	4,399	826	32,650	11,336
Batting average	44.43	34.41	43.64	34.66
100s/50s	12/21	0/6	87/160	15/71
Top score	187	78	243*	206
Balls bowled	406	105	7,133	2,294
Wickets	4	3	84	42
Bowling average	39.50	21.33	47.97	43.40
5 wickets in innings	0	0	1	1
10 wickets in match	0	0	0	0
Best bowling	2/16	2/10	5/45	6/32
Catches/stumpings	51/–	8/–	323/–	86/–
Medal record
Men's Cricket
Representing West Indies
ICC Cricket World Cup
Winner	1975 England
Winner	1979 England
- Source: ESPNcricinfo, 2 July 2013

Alvin Isaac Kallicharran BEM (born 21 March 1949) is a Guyanese former cricketer who played Test cricket for the West Indies between 1972 and 1981 as a left-handed batsman and right-arm off spinner. He was a member of the squads which won the 1975 Cricket World Cup and the 1979 Cricket World Cup.

Kallicharran, who is of Tamil origin, was born in Port Mourant, British Guiana (now Guyana), where he started playing street cricket until his professional debut as captain of the under-16 Guyana team in 1966 and his first class debut in 1967.

He was a Wisden Cricketer of the Year for 1983. He was part of the 1975 and 1979 teams that won the Cricket World Cup. His highest score is 187 against India in the 1978–79 tour. He also found success with Warwickshire in English County cricket. While playing against minor county Oxfordshire in the 1984 one day Natwest Trophy he scored 206 and took 6 for 32.

One of his most noted international innings, a knock of 158 against England, was shrouded in controversy when he was run out by Tony Greig on the final ball of the second day. After the ball had been defended and Kallicharran had started to walk off, Greig threw down the stumps at the non-striker's end, running him out. After negotiations off the pitch, England withdrew their appeal, allowing Kallicharran to continue the next morning.

He attempted to join World Series Cricket, but failed. He was appointed captain of the West Indian cricket team in India and Sri Lanka in 1978–79 when Clive Lloyd resigned over the Kerry Packer issue.

Kallicharan was later involved in further controversy when he led an unofficial rebel tour to South Africa in defiance of the Gleneagles Agreement and anti-apartheid protesters in that country who asserted that official sporting structures were discriminatory. He saw out the rest of his career playing for Orange Free State and Transvaal in South African domestic cricket.

He is an avowed devotee of Sathya Sai Baba.

== Family ==
His brother Derek played first class cricket for Guyana and later the United States of America. His nephews, Mahendra Nagamootoo and Vishal Nagamootoo, are also cricketers.

Presently, Kallicharran lives with his wife, Patsy, and is involved in coaching cricket among youth at Triangle Cricket League in Morrisville, North Carolina. He was awarded the British Empire Medal in the 2019 New Year's Honours List for services to cricket and charity.

In 2019, he was a mentor for Puducherry men's and women's cricket teams.

Preceded by Clive Lloyd	West Indies Test cricket captains 1977/8–1978/9	Succeeded by Deryck Murray
