= Ray Joseph =

Guyanese cricketer (born 1961)

Ray Fitzpatrick Joseph was a Guyanese cricketer active during the late 1970s and early 1980s who played predominantly for Berbice and Guyana, with brief appearances for Northamptonshire (Northants) and Scotland. He was born in Berbice on 12 February 1961. He appeared in 28 first-class matches as a righthanded batsman who bowled right arm fast medium. He scored 137 runs with a highest score of 26 not out and took 49 wickets with a best performance of six for 114.

Joseph played one season in 1982 as overseas professional/coach with Scottish East League side, Kirkcaldy Cricket Club (now defunct). During his spell at Kirkcaldy, he gained a cap playing for the Scotland national cricket team.
