= John Sullivan (Lancashire cricketer) =

English cricketer (1945–2006)

Personal information
- Born: 5 February 1945; Stalybridge, Cheshire, England
- Died: 22 February 2006 (aged 61); Oldham, Greater Manchester
- Batting: Right-handed
- Bowling: Right-arm medium-pace
- Role: All-rounder

Domestic team information
- Years: Team
- 1963–1976: Lancashire

Career statistics
| Competition | FC | List A |
|---|---|---|
| Matches | 154 | 139 |
| Runs scored | 4,286 | 2365 |
| Batting average | 20.50 | 21.50 |
| 100s/50s | 0/18 | 0/9 |
| Top score | 81* | 76* |
| Balls bowled | 4,948 | 2,847 |
| Wickets | 76 | 113 |
| Bowling average | 29.15 | 17.50 |
| 5 wickets in innings | 0 | 2 |
| 10 wickets in match | 0 | 0 |
| Best bowling | 4/19 | 5/22 |
| Catches/stumpings | 85/0 | 28/0 |
- Source: Cricinfo, 30 July 2013

John Sullivan (5 February 1945 – 22 February 2006) was an English cricketer. He played for Lancashire as a right-handed middle-order batter and a right-arm medium-pace swing and seam bowler between 1963 and 1976.

Sullivan's obituary in Wisden Cricketers' Almanack states that he was "arguably the first player to be branded a one-day specialist", and he was an integral and important part of the Lancashire side that won the first two 40-over Sunday League competitions in 1969 and 1970 and won the Gillette Cup knock-out tournament for an unprecedented three consecutive seasons from 1970 to 1972.
