= Indian cricket team in the West Indies in 2001–02 =

Indian cricket team in West Indies in 2002
	India	West Indies
- Dates: 11 April – 2 June 2002
Captains	Sourav Ganguly	Carl Hooper

Test series
- Result: West Indies won the 5-match series 2–1
Most runs	VVS Laxman (474)	Carl Hooper (579)
Most wickets	Zaheer Khan (15)	Mervyn Dillon (23)
- Player of the series: Shivnarine Chanderpaul (WI)

One Day International series
- Results: India won the 5-match series 2–1
Most runs	Sourav Ganguly (136)	Chris Gayle (103)
Most wickets	Ajit Agarkar (6)	Mervyn Dillon (7)

The India national cricket team toured the West Indies from April to June 2002 to play 5 Test matches and 5 Limited Overs Internationals.

== Squads ==
Tests		ODIs	
West Indies	India	West Indies	India
Carl Hooper (c); Brian Lara (vc); Chris Gayle; Stuart Williams; Ramnaresh Sarwan; Shivnarine Chanderpaul; Ryan Hinds; Junior Murray; Mervyn Dillon; Cameron Cuffy; Adam Sanford; Mahendra Nagamootoo; Marlon Black; Ridley Jacobs (wk); Pedro Collins; Wavell Hinds	Sourav Ganguly (c); Rahul Dravid (vc); Sachin Tendulkar; Wasim Jaffer; VVS Laxman; SS Das; Sanjay Bangar; Dinesh Mongia; Ajay Ratra; Deep Dasgupta; Anil Kumble; Javagal Srinath; Zaheer Khan; Murali Kartik; Harbhajan Singh; Tinu Yohannan; Sarandeep Singh	Carl Hooper (c); Brian Lara (vc); Chris Gayle; Wavell Hinds; Ramnaresh Sarwan; Shivnarine Chanderpaul; Ridley Jacobs (wk); Gareth Breese; Ryan Hinds; Mervyn Dillon; Pedro Collins; Cameron Cuffy; Corey Collymore	Sourav Ganguly (c); Rahul Dravid (vc); Sachin Tendulkar; Virender Sehwag; VVS Laxman; Dinesh Mongia; Yuvraj Singh; Mohammad Kaif; Ajay Ratra; Ajit Agarkar; Zaheer Khan; Murali Kartik; Harbhajan Singh; Tinu Yohannan

== Tour matches ==
=== Match 1 ===
5-7 April 2002

Guyana Board President's XI	v	India
118 (62.3 overs); Homchand Pooran 41; Harbhajan Singh 4/37 (19 overs)		248 (99 overs); Sanjay Bangar 76; Damodar Daesrath 3/49 (21 overs)
168 (54.2 overs); Vishal Nagamootoo 78; Anil Kumble 5/50 (21 overs)		39/1 (16.1 overs); Deep Dasgupta 19; Damodar Daesrath 1/6 (3 overs)

Indians won by 9 wickets
Everest Cricket Club Ground, Georgetown
Umpires: Clyde Duncan, Eddie Nicholls (WI)

- Guyana Board President's XI, elected to bat first

== Test series summary ==
- 1st Test at Bourda, Georgetown – match drawn.
- 2nd Test at Queen's Park Oval, Port of Spain, Trinidad – India won by 37 runs.
- 3rd Test at Kensington Oval, Bridgetown, Barbados – West Indies won by 10 wickets.
- 4th Test at Antigua Recreation Ground, St John's – match drawn.
- 5th Test at Sabina Park, Kingston – West Indies won by 155 runs.

=== 1st Test ===
11–15 April 2002
Scorecard

West Indies	v	India
501 (163.1 overs); Carl Hooper 233 (402); Javagal Srinath 3/91 (33 overs)		395/7 (140.3 overs); Rahul Dravid 144* (345); Cameron Cuffy 3/57 (27 overs)

Match drawn
Bourda, Georgetown
Umpires: Asoka de Silva (SL) and Daryl Harper (Aus)
Player of the match: Carl Hooper (WI)

- West Indies won the toss and decided to bat.
- Adam Sanford (WI) made his Test debut.

=== 2nd Test ===
19–23 April 2002
Scorecard

India	v	West Indies
339 (115.5 overs); Sachin Tendulkar 117 (260); Marlon Black 3/53 (17.5 overs)		245 (77.5 overs); Brian Lara 52 (78); Javagal Srinath 3/71 (22 overs)
218 (92.1 overs); Sourav Ganguly 75* (227); Mervyn Dillon 4/42 (21.1 overs)		275 (115.1 overs); Shivnarine Chanderpaul 67* (162); Javagal Srinath 3/69 (32 overs)

India won by 37 runs
Queen's Park Oval, Port of Spain
Umpires: Asoka de Silva (SL) and Daryl Harper (Aus)
Player of the match: VVS Laxman (Ind)

- West Indies won the toss and decided to field.
- Ajay Ratra (Ind) made his Test debut.

=== 3rd Test ===
2–5 May 2002
Scorecard

India	v	West Indies
102 (33.4 overs); Sourav Ganguly 48 (129); Merv Dillon 4/41 (11 overs)		394 (135.5 overs); Carl Hooper 115 (235); Ashish Nehra 4/112 (32 overs)
296 (101.2 overs); Sourav Ganguly 60* (146); Merv Dillon 4/32 (31.2 overs)		5/0 (1.4 overs); Stuart Williams 4* (2); Sachin Tendulkar 0/1 (1 over)

West Indies won by 10 wickets
Kensington Oval, Bridgetown
Umpires: Asoka de Silva (SL), Daryl Harper (Aus)
Player of the match: Mervyn Dillon (WI)

- West Indies won the toss and decided to field.

=== 4th Test ===
10–14 May 2002
Scorecard

India	v	West Indies
513/9d (196 overs); VVS Laxman 130 (244); Cameron Cuffy 3/87 (40 overs)		629/9d (248 overs); Carl Hooper 136* (510); Wasim Jaffer 2/18 (11 overs)

Match drawn
Antigua Recreation Ground, St John's
Umpires: David Shepherd (Eng) and Russell Tiffin (Zim)
Player of the match: Ajay Ratra (Ind)

- West Indies won the toss and decided to field.
- VVS Laxman, Rahul Dravid and Wasim Jaffer (all Ind) took their maiden Test wickets.

=== 5th Test ===
18–22 May 2002
Scorecard

West Indies	v	India
422 (132 overs); Wavell Hinds 113 (200); Harbhajan Singh 5/138 (38 overs)		212 (75 overs); VVS Laxman 65* (152); Merv Dillon 5/71 (24 overs)
197 (62.2 overs); Shivnarine Chanderpaul 59 (132); Zaheer Khan 4/79 (20 overs)		252 (88.3 overs); Sachin Tendulkar 86 (139); Adam Sanford 3/48 (19 overs)

West Indies won by 155 runs
Sabina Park, Kingston
Umpires: David Shepherd (Eng) and Russell Tiffin (Zim)
Player of the match: Wavell Hinds (WI)

- India won the toss and decided to field.

== One Day Internationals (ODIs) ==
=== 1st ODI ===
25 May 2002
Scorecard

West Indies	v	India

Match abandoned
Sabina Park, Kingston, Jamaica
Umpires: EA Nicholls (WI) and RB Tiffin (ZIM)

=== 2nd ODI ===
26 May 2002
Scorecard

West Indies	v	India

Match abandoned
Sabina Park, Kingston, Jamaica
Umpires: BR Doctrove (WI) and DR Shepherd (ENG)

=== 3rd ODI ===
29 May 2002
Scorecard

West Indies; 186 (44.5 overs)	v	India; 187/3 (43.5 overs)
CL Hooper 76* (75); T Yohannan 3/33 (10 overs)		D Mongia 74 (104); M Dillon 1/30 (10 overs)

India won by 7 wickets (D/L method)
Kensington Oval, Bridgetown, Barbados
Umpires: EA Nicholls (WI) and RB Tiffin (ZIM)
Player of the match: D Mongia (IND)

- India won the toss and elected to field.
- The match was reduced to 49 overs per side, India's target was 187 runs.
- T Yohannan (IND) made his ODI debut.

=== 4th ODI ===
1 June 2002
Scorecard

India; 123 (25 overs)	v	West Indies; 124/3 (22.1 overs)
SC Ganguly 39 (44); CD Collymore 3/14 (5 overs)		CH Gayle 84 (67); T Yohannan 2/50 (5 overs)

West Indies won by 7 wickets
Queen's Park Oval, Port of Spain, Trinidad
Umpires: BR Doctrove (WI) and DR Shepherd (ENG)
Player of the match: CH Gayle (WI)

- India won the toss and elected to bat.
- The match was reduced before play started to 25 overs per side.

=== 5th ODI ===
2 June 2002
Scorecard

India; 260 (50 overs)	v	West Indies; 191 (36.2 overs)
SR Tendulkar 65 (70); M Dillon 5/52 (10 overs)		S Chanderpaul 51 (40); AB Agarkar 3/33 (8 overs)

India won by 56 runs (D/L method)
Queen's Park Oval, Port of Spain, Trinidad
Umpires: EA Nicholls (WI) and RB Tiffin (ZIM)
Player of the match: SR Tendulkar (IND)

- India won the toss and elected to bat.
- West Indies target was 248 runs in 44 overs.
