= Derek Kallicharran =

Guyanese cricketer (born 1958)

Cricket information
- Batting: Left-handed
- Bowling: Legbreak, googly

Career statistics
Competition	First-class	List A
Matches	39	9
Runs scored	1,459	199
Batting average	24.72	28.42
100s/50s	0/9	0/2
Top score	88	68
Balls bowled	7,333	110
Wickets	98	4
Bowling average	37.58	21.75
5 wickets in innings	5	0
10 wickets in match	0	0
Best bowling	6/60	2/15
Catches/stumpings	35/–	0/–
- Source: CricketArchive, 30 May 2019

Derek Isaac Kallicharran (born 4 April 1958) is a former first class cricketer. The brother of Alvin Kallicharran, Derek played for Guyana at Under-19 level and with the senior side in the Shell Shield. In 1983 he toured Zimbabwe with the West Indies 'B'.

After joining the Eastern American Cricket Association he appeared in the 1994 ICC Trophy for the United States and again three years later.
