= Cornelia Ida =

Town in Guyana, South America

- Village
- Location within Guyana
- Coordinates: 6.862090°N 58.269630°W
- Country: Guyana
- Region: Essequibo Islands-West Demerara

Population (2012):
  - Total: 3,161
- Time zone: UTC-04:00 (GYT)

Cornelia Ida, is a village on Guyana’s Atlantic coast, in Essequibo Islands-West Demerara, approximately 14.2 km (8.8 mi) northwest of Georgetown, Guyana, and about 5 km (3.1 mi) southeast of the mouth of the Essequibo river, Guyana’s largest river. Cornelia Ida is situated in Guyana's Administrative Region 3.

In 2012 Cornelia Ida had a population of about 3,161 people in 920 households, according to Guyana's 2012 census. Cornelia Ida is next to the villages of Anna Catherina, Edinburg, Leonora, Fellowship, Den Amstel, Stewartville, Hague, Groenveldt, Blankenburg, and La Jalousie, which are all within a distance of about 3 km (1.9 mi). According to Guyana's 2012 census, at least 15,414 people lived in Cornelia Ida and the above villages, which are within a distance of about 3 km (1.9 mi) from Cornelia Ida’s centre. Most of Guyana's people live along the Atlantic coast, and Cornelia Ida is part of a line of towns that stretches along the Atlantic coast, from Georgetown to the northwest and southeast.

== Geography ==
Cornelia Ida is divided into six sections

- Sea View
- Block X
- Block Y
- Block N
- Cornelia Ida Squatting Area
- Cornelia Housing Scheme

Cornelia Ida stretches less than 2 km (1.2 mi) inland from the coast, and inland are many agricultural fields that can be seen from the town. Agriculture is important to Cornelia Ida's economy, and the town is situated near rice and sugarcane fields. Cornelia Ida is also crisscrossed by agricultural canals. Tropical rainforests are also within easy driving distance of the town's centre.

== Transportation ==
Cornelia Ida is connected to Georgetown by Guyana's West Demerara Highway, and is also 40.5 km (25.2 mi) away from Guyana's Cheddi Jagan International Airport, Guyana's primary airport, and 19.1 km (11.9 mi) away from Eugene F. Correia International Airport, Guyana's second most important commercial airport.

== History ==
The area where Cornelia Ida now stands has been inhabited by native peoples for thousands of years. The Dutch, established a trading post on the Essequibo River in 1616. According to local stories, Dutch planters named the area “Cornelia and Ida” after two sisters, Cornelia and Ida, before it became a town. Cornelia Ida seems to be named after "ladies in the family." Also, according to local stories, Dutch settlers lived in the area where Cornelia now stands since at least the 1600s, and some gravestones there were built in 1678, strongly suggesting Dutch habitation in what is now Cornelia Ida before that date.

The area where Cornelia Ida now stands was ceded to the United Kingdom in 1814.

== Cultural ==
Cornelia Ida contains houses of worship of several religions, including Christian churches and Hindu temples. One such temple is Kali Mandir, which was founded in 1903, and is devoted to the worship of the Hindu goddess Durga Kali. Cornelia Ida is also home to Saraswati Vidya Niketan, a secondary school located on the grounds of a Hindu temple there. The Hon. Sonia Parag, Minister of Education of Guyana, called Saraswati Vidya Niketan a “beacon of academic excellence”. Cornelia Ida also contains institutions for helping needy children, such as Prabhu Sharan Children’s Home and Save R Kids Home., which are both residential children's homes that provide education and sustenance to children in need.
