= Milton Pydanna =

West Indian cricketer (1950–2025)

Milton Pydana
Personal information
- Full name: Milton Robert Pydana
- Born: 27 January 1950; New Amsterdam, Guyana
- Died: 15 April 2025 (aged 75); New York, U.S.
- Batting: Right-handed
- Role: Wicket-keeper

International information
- National side: West Indies
- ODI debut (cap 34): 21 November 1980 v Pakistan
- Last ODI: 17 December 1983 v India

Domestic team information
- Years: Team
- 1970–1988: Guyana
- 1971–1988: Berbice

Career statistics
Competition	ODIs	FC	LA
Matches	3	85	27
Runs scored	2	2,223	220
Batting average	–	20.02	14.66
100s/50s	0/0	2/9	0/0
Top score	2*	127	29
Balls bowled	0	6	0
Wickets	–	0	–
Bowling average	–	–	–
5 wickets in innings	–	0	–
10 wickets in match	–	0	–
Best bowling	–	0/17	–
Catches/stumpings	2/1	152/36	21/11
- Source: Cricket Archive, 18 October 2010

Milton Robert Pydana (27 January 1950 – 15 April 2025) was a Guyanese cricketer who represented the West Indies in three One Day International (ODI) matches. A skilled wicket-keeper and right-handed batsman who typically played in the middle to lower order, Pydana had a notable first-class cricket career with Guyana spanning 17 seasons (1970–1987). He also served as captain of the Berbice team in Guyanese domestic cricket, leading them to multiple championship victories.

Pydana joined the West Indies cricket team on two international tours as a reserve wicketkeeper: first in Pakistan (1980–81) behind David Murray, and later in India (1983–84) as understudy to Jeff Dujon. During the Pakistan tour, he made his international debut and played in two ODIs, memorably scoring the winning runs in his second match—the only time he batted in international competition. His third and final ODI appearance came during the India tour.

Following his cricket career, Pydana emigrated to the United States in 1989, settling in Brooklyn, New York with his family. He remained there until his death on 15 April 2025, at the age of 75.
