= Hubern Evans =

Guyanese cricketer (born 1956)

Personal information
- Born: 16 April 1956 (age 70); Berbice, British Guiana
- Source: Cricinfo, 19 November 2020

Hubern Evans (born 16 April 1956) is a Guyanese cricketer. He played in nine first-class matches for Guyana from 1976 to 1989.

== See also ==
- List of Guyanese representative cricketers
