= Shivnarine Chanderpaul =

West Indian cricketer

Shivnarine Chanderpaul CCH
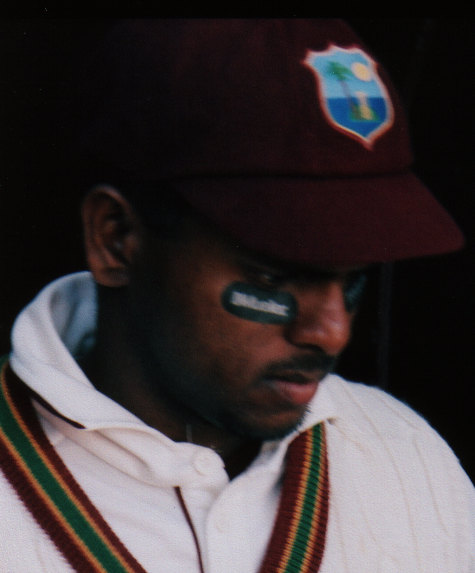
- Chanderpaul playing for West Indies in 2006

Personal information
- Born: 16 August 1974 (age 52); Unity Village, Demerara-Mahaica, Guyana
- Batting: Left-handed
- Bowling: Right-arm leg break
- Role: Batsman
- Relatives: Tagenarine Chanderpaul (son); Lawrence Prittipaul (cousin)

International information
- National side: West Indies (1994–2015)
- Test debut (cap 204): 17 March 1994 v England
- Last Test: 1 May 2015 v England
- ODI debut (cap 66): 17 October 1994 v India
- Last ODI: 23 March 2011 v Pakistan
- ODI shirt no.: 6
- T20I debut (cap 4): 16 February 2006 v New Zealand
- Last T20I: 20 May 2010 v South Africa

Domestic team information
- Years: Team
- 1991/92–2017/18: Guyana
- 2007–2009: Durham
- 2008: Royal Challengers Bangalore
- 2010, 2017–2018: Lancashire
- 2011: Warwickshire
- 2012: Khulna Royal Bengal
- 2012: Uva Next
- 2013: Sylhet Royals
- 2013–2014: Derbyshire
- 2015: Guyana Amazon Warriors

Career statistics
Competition	Test	ODI	T20I	FC
Matches	164	268	22	385
Runs scored	11,867	8,778	343	27,545
Batting average	51.37	41.60	20.17	53.17
100s/50s	30/66	11/59	0/0	77/144
Top score	203*	150	41	303*
Balls bowled	1,740	740	0	4,812
Wickets	9	14	0	60
Bowling average	98.11	45.42	–	42.20
5 wickets in innings	0	0	–	0
10 wickets in match	0	0	–	0
Best bowling	1/2	3/18	–	4/48
Catches/stumpings	66/–	73/–	7/–	192/–
Medal record
Men's Cricket
Representing West Indies
ICC Champions Trophy
Winner	2004 England
Runner-up	2006 India
Runner-up	1998 Kenya
- Source: ESPNcricinfo, 23 August 2018

Shivnarine Chanderpaul CCH (born 16 August 1974) is a Guyanese cricket coach and former captain of the West Indies cricket team. Considered one of the greatest batsmen of his era, Chanderpaul is the 10th highest run scorer of all time in International cricket and the 9th highest in Test cricket. Chanderpaul was a member of the West Indies team that won the 2004 ICC Champions Trophy, and in the 2004 ICC Champions Trophy Final, he had the highest contribution for West Indies with the bat, scoring 47 runs.

Chanderpaul captained West Indies in 14 Tests and 16 One Day Internationals. A left-handed batsman, Chanderpaul is well known for his unorthodox batting stance, which has been described as crab-like. He scored 20,000 runs in international cricket, and in 2008 he was named as one of the five Cricketers of the Year by the Wisden Cricketers' Almanack, and awarded Sir Garfield Sobers Trophy (ICC Cricketer of the Year) by the International Cricket Council.

He made his international debut at the age of 19, but did not score a century in international cricket for three years, prompting some criticism. Early in his career, he was plagued by injuries, and was even dubbed a hypochondriac until he had a piece of floating bone removed from his foot in 2000. After that he enjoyed consistent form, scoring over 11,000 runs in Test cricket. Chanderpaul was dropped from the West Indies squad in 2015. He announced his retirement from international cricket in 2016, without a farewell, at the age of 41.

He is currently serving as head coach of the USA senior women's and the USA Under-19 women's teams. In November 2022, he was inducted to the ICC Hall of Fame. He was also awarded the Cacique's Crown of Honour, the second highest award in the Order of Service of Guyana, in 2009.

== Early life and domestic career ==
Shivnarine Chanderpaul was born to Hindu Indo-Guyanese parents Kamraj and Uma Chanderpaul in Unity Village, Guyana on 16 August 1974. His father, Kamaraj Chanderpaul, helped to nurture his cricketing ability as a youngster. His ancestors emigrated from India to British Guiana as indentured labours under the Indian indenture system. By the age of eight, Chanderpaul was playing for his village's cricket team, and would frequently bat for hours, being bowled at by various members of his family. His father initially took him to the Everest club in Georgetown, but there was not a place for him at the club, and so he instead joined the Demerara Cricket Club. He appeared for the club's under-16 team while only ten. He was later given an opportunity at the Georgetown Cricket Club.

He made his first-class cricket debut for Guyana at the age of 17, facing Leeward Islands in the 1991–92 Red Stripe Cup. He was run out for a duck in his first innings, but scored 90 runs in the second. His List A debut followed a few days later, against Barbados, in which Chanderpaul did not get a chance to bat in a match with no result. He achieved his maiden first-class century in April 1993, playing for the West Indies Board President's XI against the touring Pakistanis. After taking four wickets in the Pakistanis' innings, Chanderpaul was one of three West Indians to score a century, scoring 140 runs, and remaining not out.

During this time, he achieved the highest first-class score of his career, in a 1995–96 Red Stripe Cup match against Jamaica. In the first-innings of the match, which was eventually drawn, he scored 303 not out from 478 deliveries. In 2007, he subsequently joined Durham as an overseas player, and helped the club collect its first major honour by top-scoring in their 2007 Friends Provident Trophy final win.

In March 2008, Chanderpaul caused some controversy when, after batting for Guyana on the first day of a Carib Beer Series match, he left to attend the WIPA awards, and did not arrive to play the following day. He was 78 not out when he left the match, without notifying his team's manager or coach. He was recorded as retiring out on the scorecard, and later returned on the third day. At the ceremony, Chanderpaul was very successful, winning three awards as the international, Test and ODI cricketer of the year.

== International career ==
During the English summer of 1993, Chanderpaul travelled with the West Indies Under-19 cricket team to England. He was the team's most successful batsman during the Test series, scoring 372 runs at a batting average of 124.00, including a score of 203 not out in the first Test, at Trent Bridge in Nottingham. In the 1993–94 Red Stripe Cup, Chanderpaul was near the top of the batting averages, and, according to the Wisden Cricketers' Almanack, he was a "contentious selection" for the subsequent Test series against England, in which he was picked as an all-rounder who could bowl leg breaks as well as bat. He bowled 16 overs in England's first innings without taking a wicket, and scored 62 runs in the West Indies reply. Chanderpaul played four Tests during his debut series, and was third amongst West Indian batsmen in terms of both runs scored and batting average, getting 288 runs at 57.60.

Over the following couple of years, Chanderpaul was in and out of the West Indian Test team, missing a visit by Australia altogether.

=== Dominating the arena ===
In his first 18 Test matches, Chanderpaul scored 1,232 runs at an average of 49.28, but despite scoring thirteen half-centuries, his highest score was 82; a Test century eluded him. He reached the milestone in his nineteenth Test, scoring 137 against India. Just over a month later, he repeated the feat in One Day International cricket, striking his maiden century in the format, scoring 109 runs, also against India.

Chanderpaul scored a further century in each of 1998, in a Test match against England, and 1999, in an ODI against South Africa. In the latter match, Chanderpaul and Carl Hooper were the only West Indian batsmen to reach double figures while batting – Chanderpaul scored 150, and Hooper reached 108. Their partnership of 226 was, at the time, a record in ODIs for the West Indies, and Chanderpaul's individual total is his highest in ODIs. During this early period of his international career, Chanderpaul suffered with a negative reputation. Along with his failure to convert half-centuries into centuries, he had a tendency to miss matches which was perceived as hypochondria. He was also in the news for late-night partying; on one occasion in 1999, he shot a policeman in the mistaken belief that he was a thief. His career took a turn for the positive in 2000, when he had surgery on his foot to remove a floating bone.

Free of his foot injury, Chanderpaul enjoyed the best series of his career to that point when he scored centuries in three of the five Test matches against India. In addition to his centuries, he also scored three half-centuries, and batted for a record 1,513 minutes between dismissals. The following year, against Australia, Chanderpaul scored a century from 69 balls – which at the time was the third fastest Test century. (Note: As of 2016 it is the equal sixth fastest in Test cricket.) Later in that same series, the two teams scored exactly the same total in their respective first innings, and Australia then reached 417 in their second, leaving West Indies requiring 418 runs to win. No team had ever successfully chased that many runs to win in a Test previously; writing for Cricinfo, Andrew Miller reported at the end of the third day that "Victory [for the West Indies] is as unlikely as ever, but it remains a remote possibility." On the final two days, Ramnaresh Sarwan and Chanderpaul—batting with a broken finger—both reached centuries, and the West Indies completed the record run-chase with three wickets remaining. He subsequently suffered what ESPNcricinfo described as "an indifferent run"; despite scoring centuries against South Africa and Bangladesh, he averaged just over 35 across eighteen innings, of which six were against either Bangladesh or Zimbabwe. Facing England at Lord's, Chanderpaul narrowly missed out on a century in both innings in July 2004. He remained not out on each occasion, scoring 128 runs in the first innings, and 97 in the second, but the West Indies were beaten by over 200 runs in the contest.

=== Captaincy ===
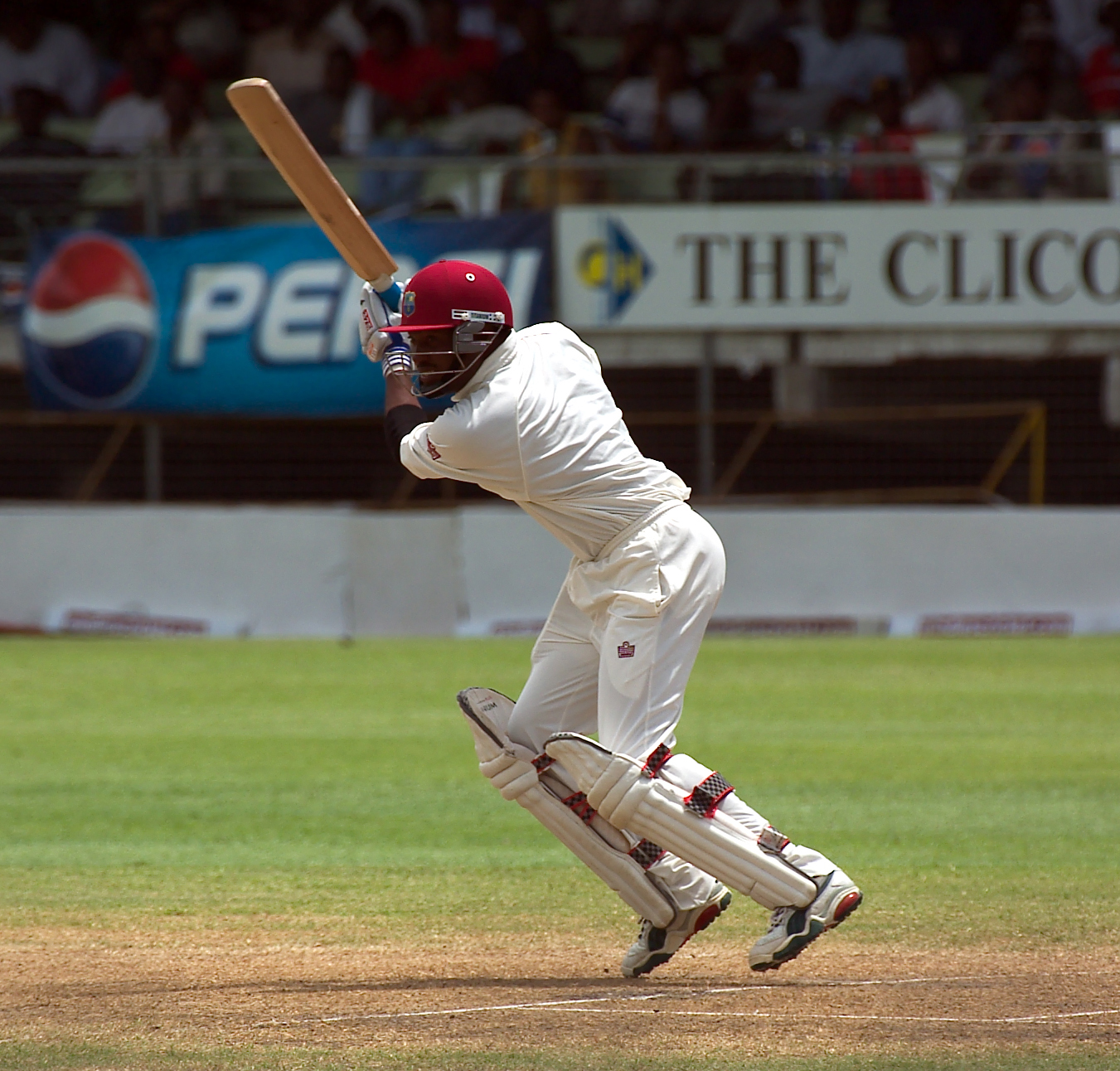
Chanderpaul took over the captaincy of the West Indies from Brian Lara (pictured) for just under a year, and is adjudged to have flourished when Lara retired.

In late 2004, Digicel began a sponsorship deal with the West Indies cricket team, and caused division within the squad. Initially, Chanderpaul was one of five players who did not attend a training camp due to disagreements about resulting commercial issues. For the following series against South Africa, seven of the West Indies best players were omitted from the squad due to contractual issues, but Chanderpaul had resolved his differences, and was named as captain in place of Lara, who was one of the missing players. In the first match of the series, Chanderpaul became only the second player, after Graham Dowling, to score a double century on his debut as captain in Test cricket. He remained 203 not out when he declared the West Indies innings closed; the joint-highest score of his Test career. Only a resolute batting performance from Jacques Kallis rescues a draw for South Africa in the match, although Chanderpaul was criticised for both the timing of his declaration, and later, negative field placings. For the second Test of the series, the West Indies were back to full-strength after the seven missing players cancelled their contracts with Cable & Wireless. Despite the return of Lara, Chanderpaul retained the captaincy. The second and third Tests of the series were both won by South Africa, before a high scoring draw in the fourth Test. Responding to South Africa's 588 for six declared, West Indies scored 747, in which Chanderpaul was one of four players to score a century.

Less than a year after taking on the captaincy, Chanderpaul resigned the position, citing a desire to concentrate on his batting. Although his batting average during his captaincy was only slightly less than his career average, the West Indies only won one Test match and two ODIs out of thirty matches under his charge. The former West Indian bowler, Colin Croft suggested that Chanderpaul "was filling a space until some else could take over the mantle." Chanderpaul's stint as captain was generally criticised in the press; Nagraj Gollapudi, writing for ESPNcricinfo described his style as unconvincing, while Ian Chappell claimed that the West Indies needed a "father figure", rather than Chanderpaul, who he thought was "predictable and reactive".

Chanderpaul's results in international matches
	Matches	Won	Lost	Drawn	Tied	No result
Test	164	39	77	48	0	–
ODI	268	110	144	–	1	13
T20I	22	9	11	–	2	–

=== Post captaincy ===
In early 2007, Chanderpaul recorded his second highest score in ODI cricket, hitting 149 not out in a losing cause against India. Later that year, he was the top-scorer for the West Indies during their series against England, aggregating 446 runs in three Tests at an average of almost 150. His achievements during the series earned him the man of the series accolade, and saw him named as one of the five Cricketers of the Year by the Wisden Cricketers' Almanack. He was especially praised by Wisden for his third instance of batting for 1,000 or more minutes without being dismissed, and for his century in the third Test on a difficult pitch. He scored another century in the fourth match of the series, and was named as the man of the match, despite an England victory. His performances throughout 2007 resulted in him being one of four players short-listed for the ICC Player of the Year award, which was eventually won by Ricky Ponting.

In 2008 Chanderpaul continued in his form during the Sri Lankan and Australian tours of the Caribbean. During the 2008 season he rose to be ranked 5th in the Test batting rankings. By the end of the third test against Australia, Chanderpaul became the fourth West Indian batsman to accomplish 8,000 runs in Test cricket as well as rising in the ranks to 2nd of the ICC test rankings, just 4 points shy of becoming the world's number 1 ranked batsman. In the Test match series against the Australians, Chanderpaul had amassed 442 runs in 6 innings, in 3 of which he had remained not out, at an average of 147.33, including two centuries and three half-centuries. From the West Indies second innings in the first Test, he was not dismissed until the final day of the series – more than 1,000 minutes of batting without losing his wicket – the fourth time he has achieved this feat in Test cricket. Chanderpaul eventually picked as part of the 2008 ICC test team of the year and bestowed with the 2008 ICC Cricketer of the Year award.

In December 2013, Chanderpaul scored his 29th test century against New Zealand in the 3rd test match at Hamilton to equal Donald Bradman's number of centuries. In the process, Chanderpaul also became the sixth highest run-scorer in Test matches, overtaking Allan Border's 11,174 runs. This was also his 17th unbeaten test ton, a new record – one more than Indian legend Sachin Tendulkar(16 unbeaten tons).

=== Late career ===
In July 2014, he played for the MCC team in the Bicentenary Celebration match at Lord's. During the Third Test against New Zealand, he was out stumped by BJ Watling, the first time in his 20-year career that he had ever done so in any form of the game. In a test series against Bangladesh in 2014, Chanderpaul continued to show his durability by achieving scores of 85*, 84* and 101*.

"I was very disappointed that Shiv was not allowed a couple of more Test matches, not necessarily to break the record but to have a proper send-off. Something I think he is very disappointed [about] and unfortunately that did not happen," Lara said."That guy with the most Test matches for the West Indies, playing for over 20 years, I don't think people in the West Indies understand exactly his contribution."

— Brian Lara.

On 23 January 2016, Chanderpaul announced his retirement from international cricket. Aged 41 at the announcement, Chanderpaul did not play for West Indies since May 2015, and his subsequent exclusion was cited to be a result of poor performances in the home series against England, in which he averaged 15.33 in 3 matches. He was also dropped from the WICB contract in December 2015, signalling the selectors' intention to move forward with younger players, despite the fragility of the West Indies middle order.

== Personality and style ==
Chanderpaul is well known for his unorthodox batting stance, in which he stands facing the bowler, as opposed to most batsmen who stand side-on. He adopts this stance in order to see the ball clearly with both eyes, something he developed as a child when facing hostile fast bowling. Despite this, when he began playing Test cricket, he had a reasonably traditional stance, with his feet only angling slightly forwards. After a year of playing international cricket, he had eliminated the forward angle, and his feet pointed square of the feet in a classical stance. Between 2000 and 2005, he started to rotate his feet forwards, until they eventually pointed almost directly down the wicket, a position he has maintained since. While he faces forwards, his bat is angled towards square-leg, prompting Scyld Berry to describe his stance as "perfectly orthodox... provided the bowler delivers from next to the umpire at square-leg, not the one at the bowler’s end." Chanderpaul's stance has frequently been described as "crab-like", and his batting has been labelled as ugly. It has been suggested that these factors have resulted in him being underrated as a batsman. When the ball is delivered, Chanderpaul moves into a more traditional position to play the ball.

As his stance has developed throughout his time playing international cricket, his batting aggression has undergone a similar transformation. He was first selected for the West Indies based on his attacking style of play; he cites Rohan Kanhai as one of his early influences. It was from Kanhai that Chanderpaul took his nickname, "Tiger". He maintained this style during the early part of his international career, but as the batting of the West Indies team around him grew weaker, he developed a more defensive style of play, and turned himself into what ESPNcricinfo's Vaneisa Baksh (cricket writer and biographer of Frank Worrel) described as "the anchor of the team, the solid man." The Australian spin bowler Shane Warne described Chanderpaul as "a bloke you needed to crowbar away from the crease," and he is often labelled as "limpet-like."

== After retirement ==
On 27 January 2017, Chanderpaul signed a Kolpak deal with Lancashire. Following a successful campaign with the club in 2017 – a season in which he scored three centuries – Chanderpaul decided to extend his contract with Lancashire by signing a one-year deal for the 2018 season. He is also still committed to playing First Class cricket for his native Guyana for the foreseeable future. In a 2022 YouTube documentary by Vice Media, Jamaican musician Sean Paul stated that one of his signature rap lyrics people assumed to be "Sean De Paul", was actually "Chanderpaul" in reference to Shivnarine, a sporting idol of his.

== Personal life ==
Shivnarine Chanderpaul and his family have been living in Orlando, Florida in the United States since 2005.

== Coaching career ==
In January 2022, he was appointed as head Coach of franchise Jamaica Tallawahs for CPL 2022 edition.

In July 2022, Chanderpaul was appointed head coach of the United States women's national cricket team. He resigned from USA Cricket after coaching the USA under-19 women to the 2023 ICC Under-19 Women's T20 World Cup.

== International centuries ==
Chanderpaul scored 30 Test centuries, including two double centuries, and reached the 100-mark 11 times in One Day International matches. He scored 77 first-class centuries.

== Achievements and statistics ==
- As of October 2016 holds the record of achieving the most times the feat of scoring fifty runs or more in both the innings of a test and remain unbeaten (or not out) (4 times).
- Most career runs in test cricket when batting at number 5 position with 6,883 runs.
- He was chosen as the most handsome man in Guyana by Guyana Malayali Samajham.
- Chanderpaul along with Stuart Williams holds the record for registering the highest opening runstand for West Indies in ODIs (200*)
- In 2018 Chanderpaul was granted an Honorary Doctorate of Laws from the University of the West Indies at St Augustine.

== Notes ==
Preceded by Brian Lara	West Indies Test cricket captain 2004/05–2006	Succeeded by Brian Lara
Preceded by Ricky Ponting	Sir Garfield Sobers Trophy; 2008	Succeeded by Mitchell Johnson
