= Kayman Sankar Cricket Ground =

Sporting venue in Hampton Court, Pomeroon-Supenaam, Guyana

Ground information
- Location: Hampton Court, Pomeroon-Supenaam, Guyana
- Coordinates: 7°18′55″N 58°28′59″W
- Establishment: 1977 (first recorded match)
- Owner: Kayman Sankar Group

Team information
1977–2004	(Essequibo)
1985–2005	(Guyana)
- As of 19 December 2014; Source: CricketArchive

The Kayman Sankar Cricket Ground is a sporting venue in Hampton Court, a village on the Atlantic coastline of Guyana's Pomeroon-Supenaam region. Its chief use has been as a cricket ground, though in recent years it has also hosted grasstrack motorcycle racing.

The ground was developed entirely by Kayman Sankar, a rice farmer who founded the Kayman Sankar Group of Companies and owned large amounts of land near Hampton Court, where his rice mill was located. At his own expense, Sankar "flew entire teams and reporters to Hampton Court to play four-day and one-day matches" at the ground, which, as the only major ground in Guyana west of the Essequibo River, was located a good distance from the capital Georgetown and the other major population centres in Demerara and Berbice. Sankar was the first president of the Essequibo Cricket Board (an affiliate of the Guyana Cricket Board), and the Essequibo cricket team first played at his ground during the 1977–78 edition of the inter-county Jones Cup, against Demerara. The ground served as a regular venue for Essequibo until the early 2000s, and the inaugural first-class match played there was the October 1980 final of the Jones Cup, between Essequibo and Berbice. Only the final of that tournament was accorded first-class status, and Essequibo, the weakest of the three counties, made the final only once.

With team and media expenses met by Sankar, the ground hosted Shell Shield matches for the Guyanese national side in 1985, 1986, and 1988, and matches in the limited overs Geddes Grant Shield in 1988 and 1989. The ground was used regularly for Guyana's one-day matches during the 1990s, with at least one match played there every year from 1994 to 1998 (two matches were played during both the 1994–95 and 1996–97 seasons). Its last major matches came during the 2004–05 season – a first-class match against the Leeward Islands and a one-day game against the Windward Islands. A number of well-known West Indies international players played for their respective national teams at the ground during the 1990s, including Ian Bishop, Brian Lara (both Trinidad and Tobago), Joel Garner (Barbados), Carl Hooper (Guyana), and Richie Richardson (Leeward Islands). Although the venue is no longer used for high-level cricket in Essequibo, with a ground in Anna Regina being preferred, it has more recently hosted several meets for the National Grasstrack Racing Club (NGRC).
