= Hampton Court, Guyana =

Hampton Court
- Village
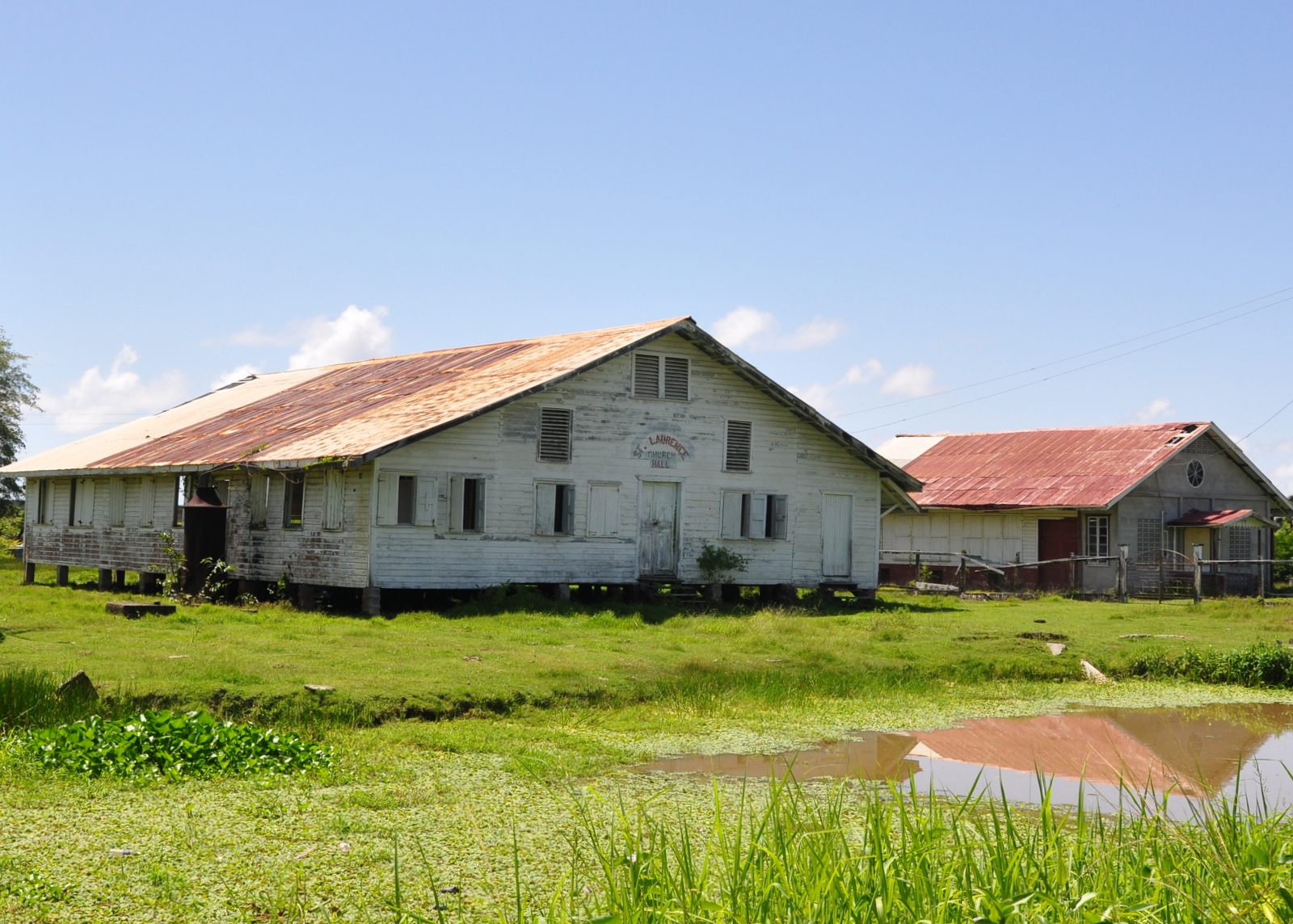
- St Lawrence Anglican School

- Location in Guyana
- Coordinates: 7.31126°N 58.48025°W
- Country: Guyana
- Region: Pomeroon-Supenaam

Population (2012)
  - Total: 619

Hampton Court is a village in the Pomeroon-Supenaam region of Guyana. The village is located on the Atlantic coast. Its population was 619 in 2012. The village was known for its sugar estate and later for its rice production.

== History ==
The village began as the largest sugar plantation on the Essequibo Coast. In its glory days, the village had a hospital, market, and a distillery. In 1934, H.P. Brasington, the owner, closed the estate. Even though 400 people lived on the grounds, their houses were destroyed, and they were forced off the land. In the late 1940s, the estate was bought by McDoom who rented out the land to East Indian farmers for rice production.

In 1966, Kayman Sankar purchased the grounds and used the land to grow rice using modern technology. His business was very successful, producing and exporting to the Caribbean and Europe. Sankar sublet ground to farmers, built a community centre, sold lots for housing, and built an airstrip.

The Kayman Sankar Cricket Ground is located in Hampton Court.

Notable people who have worked or resided in Hampton Court include Beni Sankar, an athlete and businessman, and Isahak Basir, a former member of the National Assembly of Guyana.
