= List A cricket =

Limited-overs form of the sport of cricket

List A cricket is a classification of the limited-overs (one-day) form of the sport of cricket, with games lasting up to eight hours. List A cricket includes One Day International (ODI) matches and various domestic competitions in which the number of overs in an innings per team ranges from forty to sixty, most commonly fifty overs, as well as some international matches involving nations who have not achieved official ODI status. Together with first-class and Twenty20 cricket, List A is one of the three major forms of cricket recognised by the International Cricket Council (ICC). In November 2021, the ICC retrospectively applied List A status to women's cricket, aligning it with the men's game.

== Status ==
Most Test cricketing nations have some form of domestic List A competition. The scheduled number of overs in List A cricket ranges from forty to sixty overs per side, most commonly fifty overs.

The categorisation of cricket matches as "List A" was not officially endorsed by the International Cricket Council until 2006, when the ICC announced it, along with its member associations, would be determining this classification in a manner similar to that done for first-class matches.

The Association of Cricket Statisticians and Historians created this category for the purpose of providing an equivalent to first-class cricket, to allow the generation of career records and statistics for comparable one-day matches. Only the more important one-day competitions in each country, plus matches against a touring Test team, are included. The categorisation was the work of Philip Bailey.

Matches were divided into three categories:

- List A comprised the matches to be included in the final list.
- List B was for matches where the players were of First-Class standard but the match was not considered to be of sufficient status (e.g. exhibition matches).
- List C was to collect any other matches played by a team that had at some time previously appeared in List A, thus showing that the status of such matches had not been overlooked.

=== Matches that qualify as List A ===
- One Day Internationals (ODIs)
- Certain other international matches
- Premier one-day tournaments in the 12 ICC Full Members
- Official matches of a touring Test team against main first-class teams
- Matches played in ICC Cricket World Cup Challenge League and above, and previously the higher levels of the ICC World Cricket League
- Australian Tri-Series matches that involved Australia A were given List A status, and are not included in One Day International statistics.

=== Matches that do not qualify as List A ===
- Twenty20 cricket, including internationals, which is classified separately
- World Cup warm-up matches
- Other Tourist matches (for example, against first-class teams that are not part of the main domestic first-class competition, such as universities)
- Festival and friendly matches
- Matches not played under standard conditions (for example, more than 11 players per side)

== First List A match ==
The first match retrospectively designated as a 'List A' game was played between Lancashire and Leicestershire in May 1963, in the preliminary round of the Gillette Cup. Each side batted for 65 overs, and bowlers were restricted to 15 overs each.

== See also ==
- List of List A cricket records

== External source ==
- ICC clarifies what counts and what doesn't, from Cricinfo, 30 July 2006
