= Guystac Trophy =

Guyanese inter-county cricket tournament

The Guystac Trophy was a Guyanese inter-county cricket tournament, the final of which had first-class status. The tournament was played annually, the final being usually between Demerara and Berbice, two former colonies and now counties of Guyana. The only exception came in 1980/81 when a side from Essequibo qualified for the final instead of Demerara. The matches were played over a maximum of 4 days but rain caused many games over the years to be drawn.

== History ==
Originally named the Jones Cup, the matches were first played in 1954/55 but the final didn't get first-class status until 1971/72. In 1973/74 they played for the Guyana President's Trophy instead of the Jones Cup and in 1984/85 they competed for the Guystac Trophy for the first time. The competition remained the Guystac Trophy until the final fixture in 1989/90 when the two sides competed for the Kenneth Sookram Memorial Trophy. The tournament has continued since 1989/90 under a number of names but the final no longer has first-class status.

== Honour board ==
Season	Result
1971/72	Match drawn - Demerara beat Berbice on 1st innings
1972/73	Demerara beat Berbice outright
1973/74	Match drawn - Berbice beat Demerara on 1st innings
1974/75	Match drawn - Berbice beat Demerara on 1st innings
1975/76	Match drawn - Demerara beat Berbice on 1st innings
1976/77	Berbice beat Demerara outright
1977/78	Berbice beat Demerara outright
1978/79	Match drawn - Berbice beat Demerara on 1st innings
1979/80	Match drawn - No decision on 1st innings between Berbice and Demerara
1980/81	Berbice beat Essequibo outright
1981/82	Match drawn - Demerara beat Berbice on 1st innings
1982/83	Match drawn - Demerara beat Berbice on 1st innings
1983/84	Match drawn - Berbice beat Demerara on 1st innings
1984/85	Demerara beat Berbice outright
1985/86	Demerara beat Berbice outright
1986/87	Match drawn - No decision on 1st innings between Berbice and Demerara
1987/88	Match drawn - Demerara beat Berbice on 1st innings
1988/89	Match drawn - No decision on 1st innings between Berbice and Demerara
1989/90	Demerara beat Berbice outright
