= Demerara cricket team =

Demerara cricket team played first-class cricket in the Jones Cup, later the Guystac Trophy, and came from the former British colony of Demerara, which is now a county of Guyana, formerly British Guiana. The other counties are Berbice and Essequibo.

They are credited as playing in the inaugural first class cricket match in the West Indies with a game against Barbados in 1865.

Demerara were winners of the Jones Cup in 1972/73, and the Guystac Trophy in 1984/85, 1985/86 and 1989/90. Cricketers to have played for them include Shivnarine Chanderpaul, Lance Gibbs, Roger Harper, Carl Hooper and Ramnaresh Sarwan. The Jones Cup was the inter-county tournament in Guyana for many years until the name was changed to that of the new sponsors of the competition, Guystac. The final, only, was a first class match during the 1970s and 1980s.

The name Demerara was often used when referring to the whole of British Guiana in the nineteenth and early twentieth centuries, resulting in some confusion for students of cricket history. Before the 1950s, it was very unusual for a player from Berbice or Essequibo to be selected to play for British Guiana.
