= Berbice cricket team =

Berbice cricket team played first-class cricket in the Guystac Trophy and against the occasional touring team during the 20th century. The team represented the county of Berbice in Guyana.

== History ==
Berbice played their inaugural first-class match in March 1960 against the touring Marylebone Cricket Club from England. Berbice were captained by Joe Solomon, who opened the batting and scored 201 not out, which remained his highest first class score. Other notable players in the side included Basil Butcher, who also scored a century, and Rohan Kanhai. In March 1961 they played a draw against EW Swanton's XI. After that, they didn't play a first-class match for another decade.

During the 1970s and 80s the team played a match every season, bar one, against Demerara, with both sides playing for the Jones Cup and later the Guystac Trophy. The first match took place in October 1971 with Basil Butcher as captain. They played annually (except in 1980/81) until 1989 when they played each other for the final time. In 1980/81, Essequibo qualified for the Jones Cup final instead of Demerara. The inter-county tournament continued after 1989/90, but none of the matches were considered first-class. Berbice won the trophy in 1976/77, 1977/78 and 1980/81.

The first player from Berbice to play Test cricket for the West Indies was John Trim, the fast bowler, in 1948.
