= List of Windward Islands first-class cricketers =

The flags of the four constituent members of the Windward Islands Cricket Association. Clockwise, from top left: Dominica, Saint Lucia, Grenada, Saint Vincent and the Grenadines.

The Windward Islands cricket team is a composite team representing the member associations of the Windward Islands Cricket Board of Control, which itself is a member association of the larger West Indies Cricket Board. The team incorporates players from several small islands in the Lesser Antilles, an island arc in the Caribbean Sea. These countries are Dominica, Grenada, Saint Lucia, and the Saint Vincent and the Grenadines, which, from 1940, made up the British Windward Islands colony (sustained until 1958). (Note: Dominica is geographically part of the Leeward Islands chain, but from 1940 was associated with the Windwards colony both politically and in cricketing terms. Barbados, although geographically part of the Windward Islands chain, was made a separate colony in 1885, and competes as a separate team in West Indian domestic cricket.) Although matches were played in the islands from the late 19th century, a combined team was not formed until the early 1950s, when semi-annual matches against a representative Leeward Islands team commenced. The Windwards played its first match at first-class level in December 1959, against a touring English side.

For the inaugural 1965–66 season of the Shell Shield, the Leewards and Windwards associations together entered a "Combined Islands" team, an arrangement which persisted on and off until the 1981–82 season, when the associations began to consistently enter separate teams. However, the Windwards still played regularly at first-class level during this time, against other West Indian domestic teams and touring international teams. Since its re-entry into the main domestic first-class competition, the team has played every season, although the team has never won the competition. In total, the Leewards have played 229 first-class matches, winning 48, drawing 66, losing 115, and having eight matches abandoned. Of these, 183 matches were played in the main West Indian domestic competition. A total of 185 players have played at least one first-class match for the team since its debut.

== Key ==
Statistics:

- ‡ – served as captain
- † – served as wicket-keeper
- M – number of matches played
- R – total runs scored in career
- HS – highest score
- * – denotes batsman was not out
- Avg – average runs scored per dismissal
- 100 – number of centuries in career
- 50 – number of half-centuries in career
- W – total wickets taken in career
- BB – best bowling figures in an innings
- Ave – average runs conceded per wicket
- 5i – number of five-wicket hauls in career
- 10m – number of ten-wicket hauls in career
- C – catches taken
- S – stumpings effected

Nationalities:

- Antigua and Barbuda (1)
- Barbados (2)
- Dominica (52)
- England (2)
- Grenada (39)
- Guyana (1)
- Saint Lucia (32)
- Saint Vincent and the Grenadines (58)
- Note: where players have strong ties to multiple countries, both nationalities are listed. For at least one player during the early years of the team, information on place of birth and/or nationality is lacking. These players are marked.

== List of players ==
Statistics only include first-class matches played for the Windward Islands, and are correct as of 14 June 2013:

| No. | Name | Nat | First | Last | M | R | HS | Avg | 100 | 50 | W | BB | Ave | 5i | 10m | C | S | Ref |
|---|---|---|---|---|---|---|---|---|---|---|---|---|---|---|---|---|---|---|
| 1 | Johnny Steele | (Grenada) | 21 Dec. 1959 | 21 Dec. 1959 | 1 | 16 | 8 | 8.00 | 0 | 0 | – | – | – | – | – | 1 | 0 | |
| 2 | Eldon Bramble | (Saint Vincent and the Grenadines) | 21 Dec. 1959 | 21 Dec. 1959 | 1 | 28 | 16 | 14.00 | 0 | 0 | – | – | – | – | – | 0 | 0 | |
| 3 | Evelyn Gresham ‡ | (Grenada) | 21 Dec. 1959 | 8 Mar. 1968 | 8 | 180 | 25 | 12.00 | 0 | 0 | 15 | 4/13 | 25.80 | 0 | 0 | 1 | 0 | |
| 4 | Alphonso Roberts | (Saint Vincent and the Grenadines) | 21 Dec. 1959 | 21 Dec. 1959 | 1 | 1 | 1 | 0.50 | 0 | 0 | – | – | – | – | – | 1 | 0 | |
| 5 | Owen Jackson | (Saint Vincent and the Grenadines) | 21 Dec. 1959 | 21 Dec. 1959 | 1 | 49 | 25 | 24.50 | 0 | 0 | 0 | 0/2 | – | 0 | 0 | 0 | 0 | |
| 6 | Ken Walker | (Grenada) | 21 Dec. 1959 | 21 Dec. 1959 | 1 | 4 | 2 | 2.00 | 0 | 0 | – | – | – | – | – | 0 | 0 | |
| 7 | Garnet Brisbane | (Saint Vincent and the Grenadines) | 21 Dec. 1959 | 18 Mar. 1961 | 2 | 27 | 16* | 9.00 | 0 | 0 | 2 | 2/45 | 36.00 | 0 | 0 | 2 | 0 | |
| 8 | Theo Redhead | (Grenada) | 21 Dec. 1959 | 18 Mar. 1961 | 2 | 61 | 19* | 20.33 | 0 | 0 | 8 | 5/39 | 14.50 | 1 | 0 | 0 | 0 | |
| 9 | Garnett Niles † | (Saint Vincent and the Grenadines) | 21 Dec. 1959 | 18 Mar. 1961 | 2 | 2 | 1 | 0.50 | 0 | 0 | – | – | – | – | – | 1 | 0 | |
| 10 | Frank Mason ‡ | (Saint Vincent and the Grenadines) | 21 Dec. 1959 | 18 Mar. 1961 | 2 | 12 | 9 | 3.00 | 0 | 0 | 2 | 1/16 | 25.00 | 0 | 0 | 1 | 0 | |
| 11 | Vivian Eli | (Dominica) | 21 Dec. 1959 | 21 Dec. 1959 | 1 | 0 | 0* | 0.00 | 0 | 0 | 0 | 0/7 | – | 0 | 0 | 0 | 0 | |
| 12 | Clifford Lewis | (Dominica) | 18 Mar. 1961 | 18 Mar. 1961 | 1 | 34 | 30 | 17.00 | 0 | 0 | – | – | – | – | – | 0 | 0 | |
| 13 | Horace Williams | (Grenada) | 18 Mar. 1961 | 8 Apr. 1971 | 5 | 125 | 54 | 13.88 | 0 | 1 | 0 | 0/1 | – | 0 | 0 | 5 | 0 | |
| 14 | Leonard Gittens | (Grenada) | 18 Mar. 1961 | 18 Mar. 1961 | 1 | 34 | 32 | 17.00 | 0 | 0 | – | – | – | – | – | 0 | 0 | |
| 15 | Clem John ‡ | (Dominica) | 18 Mar. 1961 | 25 Jan. 1969 | 9 | 421 | 77 | 28.06 | 0 | 1 | – | – | – | – | – | 3 | 0 | |
| 16 | A. la Roque | (Dominica) | 18 Mar. 1961 | 18 Mar. 1961 | 1 | 29 | 18 | 14.50 | 0 | 0 | – | – | – | – | – | 0 | 0 | |
| 17 | I. Athaley | (Barbados) | 18 Mar. 1961 | 18 Mar. 1961 | 1 | 3 | 2 | 1.50 | 0 | 0 | 0 | 0/14 | – | 0 | 0 | 0 | 0 | |
| 18 | Henry Elwin | (Dominica) | 22 May 1965 | 27 Mar. 1967 | 5 | 163 | 34 | 16.30 | 0 | 0 | – | – | – | – | – | 3 | 0 | |
| 19 | Tony Renwick | (Grenada) | 22 May 1965 | 22 May 1965 | 1 | 14 | 13 | 7.00 | 0 | 0 | – | – | – | – | – | 0 | 0 | |
| 20 | Irvine Shillingford ‡ | (Dominica) | 22 May 1965 | 2 Apr. 1982 | 37 | 2250 | 238 | 36.29 | 3 | 11 | 1 | 1/15 | 46.00 | 0 | 0 | 38 | 0 | |
| 21 | J. Sardine | (Saint Vincent and the Grenadines) | 22 May 1965 | 22 May 1965 | 1 | 20 | 13 | 20.00 | 0 | 0 | 5 | 5/81 | 16.20 | 1 | 0 | 0 | 0 | |
| 22 | Mike Findlay ‡† | (Saint Vincent and the Grenadines) | 22 May 1965 | 6 Apr. 1978 | 26 | 1118 | 90 | 27.95 | 0 | 10 | – | – | – | – | – | 50 | 12 | |
| 23 | Winston Mauricette | (Saint Lucia) | 22 May 1965 | 25 Nov. 1965 | 2 | 36 | 20* | 36.00 | 0 | 0 | 1 | 1/18 | 44.00 | 0 | 0 | 0 | 0 | |
| 24 | Kelleb Laurent | (Dominica) | 22 May 1965 | 28 Jul. 1973 | 9 | 123 | 38 | 10.25 | 0 | 0 | 35 | 6/39 | 19.37 | 3 | 1 | 6 | 0 | |
| 25 | Jerome Mellow | (Dominica) | 22 May 1965 | 27 Mar. 1967 | 5 | 32 | 21 | 4.57 | 0 | 0 | 15 | 5/62 | 25.00 | 1 | 0 | 2 | 0 | |
| 26 | David Archer | (Barbados) | 22 May 1965 | 16 Feb. 1967 | 3 | 17 | 11* | 5.66 | 0 | 0 | 1 | 1/27 | 121.00 | 0 | 0 | 0 | 0 | |
| 27 | E. Lowe | | 25 Nov. 1965 | 25 Nov. 1965 | 1 | 33 | 22 | 16.50 | 0 | 0 | – | – | – | – | – | 0 | 0 | |
| 28 | Jerome Pierre | (Dominica) | 25 Nov. 1965 | 25 Nov. 1965 | 1 | 0 | 0 | 0.00 | 0 | 0 | 6 | 4/32 | 6.16 | 0 | 0 | 1 | 0 | |
| 29 | Hollis Bristol ‡ | (Saint Lucia) | 16 Feb. 1967 | 8 Mar. 1968 | 3 | 120 | 86 | 24.00 | 0 | 1 | – | – | – | – | – | 1 | 0 | |
| 30 | Bryan Mauricette † | (Saint Lucia) | 16 Feb. 1967 | 14 Apr. 1972 | 4 | 47 | 20 | 9.40 | 0 | 0 | – | – | – | – | – | 1 | 0 | |
| 31 | C. Charlemagne | (Dominica) | 16 Feb. 1967 | 8 Mar. 1968 | 3 | 12 | 8* | 6.00 | 0 | 0 | 5 | 3/37 | 32.00 | 0 | 0 | 3 | 0 | |
| 32 | Earl Cenac | (Saint Lucia) | 15 Mar. 1967 | 14 Jan. 1978 | 4 | 47 | 22 | 9.40 | 0 | 0 | – | – | – | – | – | 6 | 0 | |
| 33 | Tyrone Harbin | (Grenada) | 15 Mar. 1967 | 27 Mar. 1967 | 2 | 60 | 36 | 15.00 | 0 | 0 | 0 | 0/12 | – | 0 | 0 | 0 | 0 | |
| 34 | Sparrow Duncan | (Saint Vincent and the Grenadines) | 15 Mar. 1967 | 7 Apr. 1970 | 8 | 252 | 42 | 22.90 | 0 | 0 | 5 | 1/20 | 46.40 | 0 | 0 | 4 | 0 | |
| 35 | Joe Gibbs | (Grenada) | 27 Mar. 1967 | 14 Apr. 1973 | 8 | 50 | 25 | 7.14 | 0 | 0 | 23 | 7/49 | 22.26 | 1 | 0 | 1 | 0 | |
| 36 | George Samuel | (Saint Lucia) | 8 Mar. 1968 | 8 Mar. 1968 | 1 | 24 | 24 | 24.00 | 0 | 0 | – | – | – | – | – | 0 | 0 | |
| 37 | Fred Trimmingham | (Saint Vincent and the Grenadines) | 8 Mar. 1968 | 8 Mar. 1968 | 1 | 4 | 4 | 4.00 | 0 | 0 | 1 | 1/29 | 33.00 | 0 | 0 | 0 | 0 | |
| 38 | Grayson Shillingford | (Dominica) | 8 Mar. 1968 | 7 Mar. 1979 | 22 | 270 | 35 | 10.38 | 0 | 0 | 52 | 5/79 | 27.53 | 1 | 0 | 5 | 0 | |
| 39 | Emanuel Charles | (Dominica) | 17 Jan. 1969 | 25 Jan. 1969 | 2 | 16 | 8 | 5.33 | 0 | 0 | – | – | – | – | – | 0 | 0 | |
| 40 | Rupert Polius | (Saint Lucia) | 17 Jan. 1969 | 23 Sep. 1972 | 5 | 51 | 24 | 5.10 | 0 | 0 | – | – | – | – | – | 2 | 0 | |
| 41 | Augustus Gregoire † | (Dominica) | 17 Jan. 1969 | 25 Jan. 1969 | 2 | 68 | 43* | 34.00 | 0 | 0 | 0 | 0/1 | – | 0 | 0 | 1 | 0 | |
| 42 | Rupert Branford | (Saint Vincent and the Grenadines) | 17 Jan. 1969 | 17 Jan. 1969 | 1 | 8 | 8 | 4.00 | 0 | 0 | 0 | 0/46 | – | 0 | 0 | 0 | 0 | |
| 43 | Douglas Cambridge | (Saint Vincent and the Grenadines) | 17 Jan. 1969 | 25 Jan. 1969 | 2 | 12 | 8 | 4.00 | 0 | 0 | 2 | 2/49 | 24.50 | 0 | 0 | 0 | 0 | |
| 44 | Nicholas Dougan | (Saint Vincent and the Grenadines) | 25 Jan. 1969 | 25 Jan. 1969 | 1 | 0 | 0 | 0.00 | 0 | 0 | – | – | – | – | – | 0 | 0 | |
| 45 | Oswald Clovey | (Grenada) | 25 Jan. 1969 | 26 Feb. 1976 | 2 | 5 | 4 | 5.00 | 0 | 0 | 0 | 0/8 | – | 0 | 0 | 1 | 0 | |
| 46 | Ralph Lowe | (Grenada) | 16 Jan. 1970 | 7 Apr. 1970 | 3 | 61 | 23 | 12.20 | 0 | 0 | – | – | – | – | – | 1 | 0 | |
| 47 | McFord Zamore | (Dominica) | 16 Jan. 1970 | 7 Apr. 1970 | 3 | 95 | 70 | 23.75 | 0 | 1 | 9 | 4/28 | 17.44 | 0 | 0 | 3 | 0 | |
| 48 | Hilton Nedd | (Grenada) | 16 Jan. 1970 | 27 Feb. 1970 | 2 | 103 | 96* | 51.50 | 0 | 0 | – | – | – | – | – | 2 | 0 | |
| 49 | David Defoe | (Dominica) | 16 Jan. 1970 | 19 Sep. 1972 | 7 | 108 | 34* | 15.42 | 0 | 0 | 16 | 4/23 | 20.06 | 0 | 0 | 1 | 0 | |
| 50 | Martial Francis | (Saint Lucia) | 16 Jan. 1970 | 14 Apr. 1973 | 9 | 122 | 28 | 10.16 | 0 | 0 | 18 | 4/78 | 33.11 | 0 | 0 | 2 | 0 | |
| 51 | Lennox Lamothe | (Grenada) | 16 Jan. 1970 | 27 Feb. 1973 | 2 | 16 | 14 | 5.33 | 0 | 0 | 1 | 1/18 | 52.00 | 0 | 0 | 2 | 0 | |
| 52 | Vincent Elwin | (Dominica) | 7 Apr. 1970 | 8 Apr. 1971 | 3 | 103 | 59 | 17.16 | 0 | 1 | 0 | 0/1 | – | 0 | 0 | 1 | 0 | |
| 53 | Norbert Phillip ‡ | (Dominica) | 7 Apr. 1970 | 1 Mar. 1985 | 39 | 1626 | 96 | 29.03 | 0 | 11 | 114 | 7/33 | 24.00 | 6 | 0 | 11 | 0 | |
| 54 | George Alfred | (Saint Lucia) | 14 Jan. 1971 | 23 Sep. 1972 | 4 | 140 | 38 | 17.50 | 0 | 0 | 0 | 0/1 | – | 0 | 0 | 2 | 0 | |
| 55 | Vibart Bute | (Saint Vincent and the Grenadines) | 14 Jan. 1971 | 14 Apr. 1972 | 3 | 40 | 23 | 10.00 | 0 | 0 | 0 | 0/0 | – | 0 | 0 | 0 | 0 | |
| 56 | Cecil la Roque | (Dominica) | 14 Jan. 1971 | 14 Jan. 1971 | 1 | 7 | 6 | 3.50 | 0 | 0 | 0 | 0/41 | – | 0 | 0 | 0 | 0 | |
| 57 | Douglas Haynes | (Saint Vincent and the Grenadines) | 15 Jan. 1972 | 14 Apr. 1972 | 1 | 36 | 36 | 18.00 | 0 | 0 | – | – | – | – | – | 1 | 0 | |
| 58 | Lockhart Sebastien ‡ | (Dominica) | 15 Jan. 1972 | 25 Feb. 1989 | 59 | 3298 | 219 | 34.00 | 5 | 20 | 8 | 4/49 | 42.75 | 0 | 0 | 32 | 0 | |
| 59 | Colville Browne | (Saint Vincent and the Grenadines) | 15 Jan. 1972 | 12 Jan. 1981 | 13 | 360 | 60 | 16.36 | 0 | 1 | 1 | 1/4 | 16.00 | 0 | 0 | 9 | 0 | |
| 60 | Zepton Greaves | (Saint Vincent and the Grenadines) | 19 Sep. 1972 | 23 Sep. 1972 | 2 | 58 | 23 | 14.50 | 0 | 0 | 0 | 0/12 | – | 0 | 0 | 0 | 0 | |
| 61 | Victor Joseph | (Grenada) | 14 Apr. 1973 | 26 Feb. 1976 | 6 | 256 | 74 | 25.60 | 0 | 2 | 0 | 0/3 | – | 0 | 0 | 4 | 0 | |
| 62 | Brindley Charles | (Dominica) | 14 Apr. 1973 | 14 Apr. 1973 | 1 | 3 | 3 | 1.50 | 0 | 0 | – | – | – | – | – | 0 | 0 | |
| 63 | Earl Fraites | (Saint Lucia) | 14 Apr. 1973 | 8 Jan. 1977 | 7 | 214 | 38* | 17.83 | 0 | 0 | 6 | 4/84 | 33.83 | 0 | 0 | 6 | 0 | |
| 64 | Derek Abraham | (Dominica) | 28 Jul. 1973 | 26 Feb. 1976 | 4 | 25 | 12 | 4.16 | 0 | 0 | 4 | 2/29 | 49.75 | 0 | 0 | 6 | 0 | |
| 65 | Peter Thomas | (Grenada) | 28 Jul. 1973 | 7 Mar. 1979 | 9 | 87 | 24* | 7.25 | 0 | 0 | 20 | 4/47 | 35.15 | 0 | 0 | 2 | 0 | |
| 66 | Adrian King | (Saint Vincent and the Grenadines) | 28 Jul. 1973 | 6 Apr. 1978 | 2 | 32 | 19 | 16.00 | 0 | 0 | 13 | 6/50 | 14.38 | 0 | 0 | 3 | 0 | |
| 67 | Matthew George | (Dominica) | 3 Mar. 1975 | 26 Feb. 1976 | 4 | 192 | 89 | 38.40 | 0 | 1 | – | – | – | – | – | 2 | 0 | |
| 68 | Stanley Hinds | (Saint Vincent and the Grenadines) | 3 Mar. 1975 | 13 Feb. 1986 | 34 | 535 | 72 | 12.73 | 0 | 1 | 124 | 6/19 | 25.13 | 6 | 1 | 25 | 0 | |
| 69 | Hubert Annibaffa | (Saint Lucia) | 3 Mar. 1975 | 7 Mar. 1979 | 12 | 43 | 8 | 4.30 | 0 | 0 | 33 | 3/33 | 29.21 | 0 | 0 | 6 | 0 | |
| 70 | Sam Isles | (Saint Vincent and the Grenadines) | 26 Feb. 1976 | 26 Feb. 1976 | 1 | 29 | 28 | 14.50 | 0 | 0 | – | – | – | – | – | 0 | 0 | |
| 71 | Eusfield John | (Dominica) | 4 Jan. 1977 | 26 Mar. 1977 | 3 | 79 | 44 | 13.16 | 0 | 1 | – | – | – | – | – | 2 | 0 | |
| 72 | Frederick Thorpe | (Saint Lucia) | 4 Jan. 1977 | 18 Mar. 1983 | 7 | 240 | 62 | 20.00 | 0 | 1 | 4 | 3/47 | 15.75 | 0 | 0 | 6 | 0 | |
| 73 | Ignatius Cadette † | (Saint Lucia) | 4 Jan. 1977 | 11 Apr. 1987 | 32 | 742 | 84 | 15.45 | 0 | 2 | – | – | – | – | – | 53 | 9 | |
| 74 | Thomas Kentish | (Dominica) | 4 Jan. 1977 | 9 Mar. 1992 | 56 | 949 | 40 | 14.60 | 0 | 0 | 135 | 6/69 | 32.16 | 4 | 0 | 41 | 0 | |
| 75 | Desmond Collymore | (Saint Lucia) | 10 Jan. 1978 | 8 Feb. 1990 | 28 | 688 | 87* | 19.11 | 0 | 2 | 70 | 5/34 | 30.80 | 1 | 0 | 16 | 0 | |
| 76 | Linton Lewis | (Saint Vincent and the Grenadines) | 6 Apr. 1978 | 1 Feb. 1991 | 31 | 1220 | 128 | 24.40 | 2 | 5 | 0 | 0/2 | – | 0 | 0 | 19 | 0 | |
| 77 | John Patrick | (Grenada) | 6 Apr. 1978 | 6 Apr. 1978 | 1 | 7 | 6 | 3.50 | 0 | 0 | – | – | – | – | – | 0 | 0 | |
| 78 | Montgomery Warner | (Saint Vincent and the Grenadines) | 2 Mar. 1979 | 11 Mar. 1980 | 2 | 93 | 45 | 23.25 | 0 | 0 | 0 | 0/3 | – | 0 | 0 | 3 | 0 | |
| 79 | Winston Davis ‡ | (Saint Vincent and the Grenadines) | 11 Mar. 1980 | 24 Jan. 1992 | 26 | 410 | 60 | 11.38 | 0 | 1 | 118 | 7/57 | 24.56 | 6 | 1 | 7 | 0 | |
| 80 | Lewis Paul | (Saint Lucia) | 11 Mar. 1980 | 11 Mar. 1980 | 1 | 1 | 1 | 0.50 | 0 | 0 | 4 | 3/72 | 27.50 | 0 | 0 | 0 | 0 | |
| 81 | Joseph Jack | (Saint Vincent and the Grenadines) | 11 Mar. 1980 | 11 Mar. 1980 | 2 | 6 | 6 | 2.00 | 0 | 0 | 3 | 2/63 | 60.00 | 0 | 0 | 2 | 0 | |
| 82 | Lance John ‡ | (Saint Vincent and the Grenadines) | 12 Jan. 1981 | 21 Feb. 1992 | 54 | 2981 | 137 | 31.05 | 3 | 20 | 0 | 0/4 | – | 0 | 0 | 28 | 0 | |
| 83 | Joseph Guiste | (Dominica) | 12 Jan. 1981 | 12 Jan. 1981 | 1 | 14 | 10 | 7.00 | 0 | 0 | – | – | – | – | – | 0 | 0 | |
| 84 | Harold Williams † | (Grenada) | 12 Jan. 1981 | 12 Jan. 1981 | 1 | 4 | 4 | 2.00 | 0 | 0 | – | – | – | – | – | 0 | 0 | |
| 85 | Kenny Hobson | (Grenada) | 12 Jan. 1981 | 17 Feb. 1984 | 2 | 2 | 2 | 0.66 | 0 | 0 | 2 | 1/24 | 25.00 | 0 | 0 | 2 | 0 | |
| 86 | Shane Julien | (Grenada) | 4 Mar. 1982 | 11 Apr. 1987 | 14 | 946 | 123 | 35.03 | 2 | 7 | – | – | – | – | – | 4 | 0 | |
| 87 | Wilf Slack ‡ | (Saint Vincent and the Grenadines) (England) | 4 Mar. 1982 | 18 Mar. 1983 | 9 | 585 | 97 | 36.56 | 0 | 3 | 2 | 2/15 | 20.50 | 0 | 0 | 13 | 0 | |
| 88 | Albert Texeira | (Saint Vincent and the Grenadines) | 4 Mar. 1982 | 1 Mar. 1985 | 14 | 345 | 48* | 17.25 | 2 | 7 | – | – | – | – | – | 14 | 0 | |
| 89 | Cecil Elwin | (Dominica) | 21 Jan. 1983 | 3 Feb. 1984 | 6 | 89 | 30 | 9.88 | 0 | 0 | – | – | – | – | – | 5 | 0 | |
| 90 | Julian Charles ‡ | (Saint Lucia) | 4 Feb. 1983 | 6 Mar. 1992 | 46 | 1741 | 114 | 22.61 | 1 | 6 | 17 | 4/20 | 37.00 | 0 | 0 | 41 | 0 | |
| 91 | Neil Williams | (Saint Vincent and the Grenadines) (England) | 4 Feb. 1983 | 21 Feb. 1992 | 17 | 638 | 66* | 23.62 | 0 | 3 | 54 | 5/33 | 23.98 | 5 | 0 | 8 | 0 | |
| 92 | Javan Etienne | (Dominica) | 21 Jan. 1984 | 1 Feb. 1990 | 26 | 312 | 32 | 12.00 | 0 | 0 | 60 | 6/35 | 33.81 | 1 | 0 | 10 | 0 | |
| 93 | Charles Walters | (Dominica) | 11 Feb. 1984 | 14 Apr. 1984 | 3 | 4 | 2 | 1.33 | 0 | 0 | – | – | – | – | – | 0 | 0 | |
| 94 | Sydney Murphy | (Saint Vincent and the Grenadines) | 11 Feb. 1984 | 3 Apr. 1987 | 7 | 29 | 7* | 4.14 | 0 | 0 | 12 | 2/46 | 58.66 | 0 | 0 | 4 | 0 | |
| 95 | Francis Maurice | (Saint Lucia) | 31 Jan. 1985 | 5 Feb. 1993 | 6 | 116 | 20* | 11.60 | 0 | 0 | – | – | – | – | – | 6 | 0 | |
| 96 | Wesley Thomas | (Grenada) | 15 Feb. 1985 | 8 Feb. 1991 | 21 | 418 | 69 | 16.72 | 0 | 1 | 46 | 4/63 | 33.04 | 0 | 0 | 11 | 0 | |
| 97 | Roy Marshall | (Dominica) | 22 Feb. 1985 | 1 Sep. 2000 | 50 | 1656 | 112 | 18.81 | 1 | 4 | 138 | 7/99 | 25.06 | 5 | 2 | 34 | 0 | |
| 98 | Steve Mahon | (Grenada) | 17 Jan. 1986 | 5 Mar. 1993 | 17 | 440 | 45 | 14.66 | 0 | 0 | 0 | 0/1 | – | 0 | 0 | 7 | 0 | |
| 99 | Dawnley Joseph ‡ | (Saint Vincent and the Grenadines) | 21 Mar. 1987 | 12 Feb. 1999 | 61 | 3326 | 134 | 30.23 | 4 | 17 | 5 | 2/29 | 39.00 | 0 | 0 | 50 | 0 | |
| 100 | Junior Murray ‡† | (Grenada) | 21 Mar. 1987 | 12 Jan. 2007 | 93 | 5075 | 218 | 32.74 | 8 | 26 | – | – | – | – | – | 195 | 24 | |
| 101 | Darwin Telemaque | (Dominica) | 29 Jan. 1988 | 8 Feb. 1990 | 9 | 315 | 71 | 19.68 | 0 | 1 | – | – | – | – | – | 6 | 0 | |
| 102 | Darren Williams | (Dominica) | 26 Jan. 1988 | 26 Feb. 1988 | 2 | 66 | 26 | 16.50 | 0 | 0 | 3 | 2/44 | 33.33 | 0 | 0 | 0 | 0 | |
| 103 | Joey Pierre | (Dominica) | 26 Feb. 1988 | 8 Feb. 1997 | 16 | 632 | 73 | 21.06 | 0 | 3 | – | – | – | – | – | 8 | 0 | |
| 104 | Ian Allen | (Saint Vincent and the Grenadines) | 26 Jan. 1989 | 16 Feb. 1996 | 33 | 459 | 36 | 11.47 | 0 | 0 | 77 | 7/48 | 35.90 | 2 | 0 | 9 | 0 | |
| 105 | Dominique Lewis | (Grenada) | 25 Feb. 1989 | 25 Feb. 1989 | 1 | 4 | 2* | 4.00 | 0 | 0 | 3 | 2/26 | 31.33 | 0 | 0 | 0 | 0 | |
| 106 | John Eugene | (Saint Lucia) | 26 Jan. 1990 | 14 Mar. 2003 | 45 | 1908 | 139 | 23.26 | 3 | 4 | 0 | 0/0 | – | 0 | 0 | 23 | 0 | |
| 107 | Mervin Durand | (Dominica) | 8 Feb. 1990 | 8 Feb. 1991 | 4 | 136 | 31 | 19.42 | 0 | 0 | 14 | 7/15 | 22.57 | 1 | 0 | 4 | 0 | |
| 108 | Cameron Cuffy | (Saint Vincent and the Grenadines) | 11 Jan. 1991 | 6 Feb. 2004 | 45 | 212 | 15 | 4.60 | 0 | 0 | 133 | 7/80 | 22.84 | 7 | 0 | 20 | 0 | |
| 109 | Ervin Warrican | (Saint Vincent and the Grenadines) | 8 Feb. 1991 | 3 Feb. 1995 | 6 | 144 | 44 | 12.00 | 0 | 0 | 8 | 3/77 | 55.12 | 0 | 0 | 7 | 0 | |
| 110 | Casper Davis | (Saint Vincent and the Grenadines) | 24 Jan. 1992 | 5 Feb. 1999 | 40 | 816 | 54 | 15.11 | 0 | 1 | 100 | 7/58 | 27.44 | 5 | 0 | 20 | 0 | |
| 111 | Leroy Lewis | (Dominica) | 24 Jan. 1992 | 24 Jan. 1992 | 1 | 9 | 5 | 4.50 | 0 | 0 | 1 | 1/35 | 65.00 | 0 | 0 | 0 | 0 | |
| 112 | Mathias Walsh | (Dominica) | 31 Jan. 1992 | 21 Feb. 1992 | 4 | 43 | 25 | 7.16 | 0 | 0 | – | – | – | – | – | 2 | 0 | |
| 113 | Rawl Lewis ‡ | (Grenada) | 31 Jan. 1992 | 26 Feb. 2010 | 108 | 4136 | 117* | 25.37 | 2 | 21 | 260 | 7/66 | 30.37 | 11 | 0 | 79 | 0 | |
| 114 | Uzzah Pope † | (Saint Vincent and the Grenadines) | 7 Feb. 1992 | 1 Sep. 2000 | 32 | 1006 | 91 | 17.96 | 0 | 5 | – | – | – | – | – | 62 | 9 | |
| 115 | Alton Crafton | (Saint Lucia) | 6 Mar. 1992 | 17 Apr. 1998 | 8 | 168 | 31 | 12.00 | 0 | 0 | – | – | – | – | – | 3 | 0 | |
| 116 | John Prince | (Saint Lucia) | 5 Feb. 1993 | 5 Mar. 1993 | 3 | 13 | 6 | 4.33 | 0 | 0 | 3 | 2/9 | 27.00 | 0 | 0 | 1 | 0 | |
| 117 | John Sylvester | (Grenada) | 12 Feb. 1993 | 25 Jan. 2001 | 20 | 643 | 70 | 17.37 | 0 | 4 | 1 | 1/10 | 20.00 | 0 | 0 | 22 | 0 | |
| 118 | Kester Sylvester | (Grenada) | 26 Feb. 1993 | 21 Feb. 2003 | 37 | 1054 | 113 | 15.50 | 1 | 5 | 1 | 1/66 | 118.00 | 0 | 0 | 32 | 0 | |
| 119 | Nixon McLean | (Saint Vincent and the Grenadines) | 26 Feb. 1993 | 3 Feb. 2000 | 18 | 376 | 52 | 16.34 | 0 | 1 | 41 | 5/37 | 30.41 | 1 | 0 | 3 | 0 | |
| 120 | Mervyn Thomas | (Dominica) | 5 Mar. 1993 | 10 Feb. 1995 | 4 | 88 | 39 | 12.57 | 0 | 0 | 0 | 0/0 | – | 0 | 0 | 0 | 0 | |
| 121 | Gosnel Cupid | (Saint Vincent and the Grenadines) | 7 Jan. 1994 | 20 Jan. 1995 | 7 | 198 | 49 | 14.14 | 0 | 0 | – | – | – | – | – | 4 | 0 | |
| 122 | Dennison Thomas | (Grenada) | 28 Jan. 1994 | 3 Feb. 2000 | 20 | 574 | 70 | 19.13 | 0 | 2 | 36 | 4/42 | 25.91 | 0 | 0 | 7 | 0 | |
| 123 | McNeil Morgan | (Saint Vincent and the Grenadines) | 27 Jan. 1995 | 15 Feb. 2002 | 29 | 287 | 35 | 6.67 | 0 | 0 | 66 | 4/27 | 25.86 | 0 | 0 | 14 | 0 | |
| 124 | Bertram Stapleton | (Saint Vincent and the Grenadines) | 10 Feb. 1995 | 7 Jan. 2000 | 3 | 49 | 19 | 12.25 | 0 | 0 | 0 | 0/1 | – | 0 | 0 | 4 | 0 | |
| 125 | Preston Thomas | (Saint Lucia) | 24 Jan. 1997 | 31 Jan. 1997 | 2 | 23 | 18 | 5.75 | 0 | 0 | – | – | – | – | – | 3 | 0 | |
| 126 | Balty Watt | (Dominica) | 24 Jan. 1997 | 12 Jan. 2001 | 23 | 809 | 86* | 18.38 | 0 | 5 | 2 | 2/5 | 25.50 | 0 | 0 | 13 | 0 | |
| 127 | Lee Stephen | (Saint Lucia) | 8 Feb. 1997 | 23 May 1997 | 2 | 39 | 17 | 9.75 | 0 | 0 | – | – | – | – | – | 2 | 0 | |
| 128 | Brian Felix | (Dominica) | 28 Feb. 1997 | 28 Feb. 1997 | 1 | 2 | 2 | 1.00 | 0 | 0 | – | – | – | – | – | 0 | 0 | |
| 129 | Denis Byam | (Saint Vincent and the Grenadines) | 10 Apr. 1997 | 16 May 1997 | 3 | 52 | 17 | 8.66 | 0 | 0 | – | – | – | – | – | 2 | 0 | |
| 130 | Kenroy Martin | (Saint Vincent and the Grenadines) | 10 Apr. 1997 | 26 Feb. 2004 | 15 | 264 | 65 | 10.56 | 0 | 1 | 6 | 3/5 | 12.66 | 0 | 0 | 11 | 0 | |
| 131 | Adam Sanford | (Dominica) | 23 May 1997 | 23 May 1997 | 1 | 30 | 30* | – | 0 | 0 | 2 | 1/5 | 27.50 | 0 | 0 | 0 | 0 | |
| 132 | Joseph Parillon | (Dominica) | 15 Jan. 1998 | 12 Feb. 1999 | 7 | 133 | 41 | 10.23 | 0 | 0 | – | – | – | – | – | 6 | 0 | |
| 133 | Richie Richardson | (Antigua and Barbuda) | 15 Jan. 1998 | 5 Mar. 1998 | 4 | 198 | 62* | 28.28 | 0 | 1 | 0 | 0/18 | – | 0 | 0 | 1 | 0 | |
| 134 | Vernon Dumas | (Dominica) | 22 Jan. 1998 | 5 Feb. 1999 | 8 | 154 | 31 | 10.26 | 0 | 0 | 10 | 4/36 | 27.00 | 0 | 0 | 6 | 0 | |
| 135 | Devon Smith ‡ | (Grenada) | 15 Jan. 1999 | 2 May 2013 | 82 | 5968 | 212 | 41.44 | 16 | 27 | 2 | 1/2 | 79.00 | 0 | 0 | 92 | 0 | |
| 136 | Wayne Phillip † | (Dominica) | 15 Jan. 1999 | 21 Jan. 2000 | 5 | 80 | 28 | 13.33 | 0 | 0 | – | – | – | – | – | 14 | 0 | |
| 137 | Reynold McLean | (Saint Vincent and the Grenadines) | 22 Jan. 1999 | 27 Jan. 2000 | 8 | 254 | 65 | 19.53 | 0 | 2 | – | – | – | – | – | 5 | 0 | |
| 138 | Danny Harris | (Saint Lucia) | 7 Jan. 2000 | 1 Sep. 2000 | 4 | 21 | 13 | 4.20 | 0 | 0 | – | – | – | – | – | 2 | 0 | |
| 139 | Tibbles Moore | (Grenada) | 3 Feb. 2000 | 3 Feb. 2000 | 1 | 9 | 9 | 4.50 | 0 | 0 | – | – | – | – | – | 1 | 0 | |
| 140 | Romel Currency | (Saint Vincent and the Grenadines) | 1 Sep. 2000 | 7 Apr. 2006 | 31 | 1292 | 121* | 23.92 | 1 | 4 | 0 | 0/21 | – | 0 | 0 | 19 | 0 | |
| 141 | Deighton Butler ‡ | (Saint Vincent and the Grenadines) | 1 Sep. 2000 | 19 Feb. 2010 | 64 | 1225 | 66 | 14.93 | 0 | 4 | 176 | 5/29 | 26.20 | 2 | 0 | 42 | 0 | |
| 142 | Camilus Alexander | (Grenada) | 1 Sep. 2000 | 6 Mar. 2009 | 5 | 142 | 62 | 23.66 | 0 | 1 | 0 | 0/15 | – | 0 | 0 | 6 | 0 | |
| 143 | Orlanzo Jackson | (Saint Vincent and the Grenadines) | 1 Sep. 2000 | 11 Mar. 2005 | 27 | 537 | 54 | 11.93 | 0 | 1 | 91 | 8/79 | 28.18 | 3 | 1 | 13 | 0 | |
| 144 | Kenroy Peters | (Saint Vincent and the Grenadines) | 1 Sep. 2000 | 23 Mar. 2013 | 48 | 607 | 52 | 12.64 | 0 | 1 | 132 | 5/43 | 21.77 | 2 | 0 | 16 | 0 | |
| 145 | Fernix Thomas | (Dominica) | 1 Sep. 2000 | 4 Mar. 2005 | 26 | 334 | 45 | 13.36 | 0 | 0 | 77 | 8/28 | 27.31 | 4 | 1 | 14 | 0 | |
| 146 | Shane Shillingford | (Dominica) | 5 Jan. 2001 | 2 May 2013 | 66 | 1302 | 63 | 14.00 | 0 | 4 | 289 | 8/33 | 21.64 | 16 | 5 | 34 | 0 | |
| 147 | Kirsten Casimir | (Dominica) | 25 Jan. 2001 | 14 Mar. 2003 | 11 | 378 | 63 | 19.89 | 0 | 2 | 0 | 0/5 | – | 0 | 0 | 11 | 0 | |
| 148 | Greg Wilson | (Saint Lucia) | 2 Feb. 2001 | 8 Feb. 2002 | 4 | 100 | 52* | 14.28 | 0 | 1 | – | – | – | – | – | 0 | 0 | |
| 149 | Clyde Telesford | (Grenada) | 1 Mar. 2002 | 1 Mar. 2002 | 1 | 14 | 11 | 7.00 | 0 | 0 | – | – | – | – | – | 1 | 0 | |
| 150 | Darren Sammy ‡ | (Saint Lucia) | 31 Jan. 2003 | 6 Mar. 2013 | 43 | 1803 | 121 | 25.75 | 1 | 15 | 102 | 6/50 | 24.66 | 4 | 0 | 59 | 0 | |
| 151 | Kevile George | (Grenada) | 7 Feb. 2003 | 7 Feb. 2003 | 1 | 2 | 2 | 1.00 | 0 | 0 | – | – | – | – | – | 1 | 0 | |
| 152 | Liam Sebastien ‡ | (Dominica) | 28 Feb. 2003 | 2 May 2013 | 47 | 1606 | 143 | 22.30 | 2 | 7 | 84 | 6/97 | 22.84 | 4 | 0 | 31 | 0 | |
| 153 | Craig Emmanuel | (Saint Lucia) | 9 Jan. 2004 | 26 Feb. 2010 | 21 | 762 | 73 | 21.16 | 0 | 5 | 1 | 1/37 | 130.00 | 0 | 0 | 15 | 0 | |
| 154 | Lindon James ‡† | (Saint Vincent and the Grenadines) | 9 Jan. 2004 | 2 May 2013 | 51 | 1402 | 70* | 17.74 | 0 | 6 | – | – | – | – | – | 153 | 15 | |
| 155 | Roland Wilkinson | (Saint Vincent and the Grenadines) | 23 Jan. 2004 | 30 Jan. 2004 | 2 | 68 | 64 | 17.00 | 0 | 1 | – | – | – | – | – | 2 | 0 | |
| 156 | Andre Fletcher † | (Grenada) | 30 Jan. 2004 | 2 May 2013 | 47 | 2417 | 116 | 29.47 | 3 | 13 | 2 | 2/32 | 54.00 | 0 | 0 | 49 | 1 | |
| 157 | Sergio Fedee | (Guyana) (Saint Lucia) | 19 Feb. 2004 | 23 Mar. 2012 | 12 | 304 | 39 | 15.20 | 0 | 0 | 0 | 0/7 | – | 0 | 0 | 9 | 0 | |
| 158 | Marvin Noel | (Grenada) | 14 Jan. 2005 | 21 Jan. 2005 | 2 | 16 | 10 | 4.00 | 0 | 0 | – | – | – | – | – | 2 | 0 | |
| 159 | Hyron Shallow | (Saint Vincent and the Grenadines) | 27 Jan. 2005 | 11 Jan. 2008 | 13 | 382 | 63 | 16.60 | 0 | 2 | 0 | 0/0 | – | 0 | 0 | 11 | 0 | |
| 160 | Alvin La Feuille † | (Saint Lucia) | 18 Feb. 2005 | 20 Jan. 2007 | 8 | 381 | 70 | 23.81 | 0 | 02 | – | – | – | – | – | 1 | 2 | |
| 161 | Jean Paul | (Dominica) | 18 Feb. 2005 | 28 Jan. 2007 | 7 | 19 | 10* | 3.16 | 0 | 0 | 15 | 4/52 | 33.53 | 0 | 0 | 2 | 0 | |
| 162 | Ezekiel Francis | (Dominica) | 4 Mar. 2005 | 5 Feb. 2007 | 2 | 19 | 14 | 4.75 | 0 | 0 | 1 | 1/16 | 16.00 | 0 | 0 | 1 | 0 | |
| 163 | Xavier Gabriel | (Saint Lucia) | 11 Mar. 2005 | 10 Apr. 2013 | 2 | 5 | 4* | 5.00 | 0 | 0 | 0 | 0/8 | – | 0 | 0 | 3 | 0 | |
| 164 | Dennis George | (Grenada) | 27 Jan. 2006 | 23 Mar. 2012 | 11 | 138 | 34* | 10.61 | 0 | 0 | 25 | 4/107 | 37.76 | 0 | 0 | 7 | 0 | |
| 165 | Heron Campbell | (Grenada) | 4 Jan. 2007 | 11 Jan. 2008 | 6 | 180 | 48 | 18.00 | 0 | 0 | – | – | – | – | – | 4 | 0 | |
| 166 | Miles Bascombe | (Saint Vincent and the Grenadines) | 28 Jan. 2007 | 26 Feb. 2010 | 16 | 607 | 54 | 21.67 | 0 | 2 | 0 | 0/7 | – | 0 | 0 | 6 | 0 | |
| 167 | Ronald Etienne | (Grenada) | 28 Jan. 2007 | 28 Jan. 2007 | 1 | 4 | 4 | 2.00 | 0 | 0 | 1 | 1/49 | 49.00 | 0 | 0 | 1 | 0 | |
| 168 | Garey Mathurin | (Saint Lucia) | 5 Feb. 2007 | 2 May 2013 | 22 | 360 | 32 | 10.90 | 0 | 0 | 67 | 7/72 | 22.97 | 3 | 1 | 21 | 0 | |
| 169 | Donwell Hector | (Saint Vincent and the Grenadines) | 4 Jan. 2008 | 6 Mar. 2013 | 23 | 722 | 99 | 19.00 | 0 | 3 | 0 | 0/1 | – | 0 | 0 | 36 | 0 | |
| 170 | Mervin Matthew | (Dominica) | 4 Jan. 2008 | 25 Mar. 2011 | 15 | 303 | 40 | 15.94 | 0 | 0 | 34 | 4/25 | 25.02 | 0 | 0 | 7 | 0 | |
| 171 | Nelon Pascal | (Grenada) | 4 Jan. 2008 | 2 May 2013 | 38 | 310 | 36 | 7.04 | 0 | 0 | 109 | 5/50 | 30.06 | 4 | 0 | 17 | 0 | |
| 172 | Salvan Browne | (Saint Vincent and the Grenadines) | 14 Mar. 2008 | 21 Mar. 2009 | 2 | 18 | 14 | 4.50 | 0 | 0 | – | – | – | – | – | 3 | 0 | |
| 173 | Raymond Casimir | (Dominica) | 14 Mar. 2008 | 21 Mar. 2009 | 2 | 9 | 6 | 3.00 | 0 | 0 | 2 | 2/69 | 44.00 | 0 | 0 | 1 | 0 | |
| 174 | Garvin Roberts | (Grenada) | 9 Jan. 2009 | 16 Jan. 2009 | 2 | 16 | 12 | 5.33 | 0 | 0 | – | – | – | – | – | 2 | 0 | |
| 175 | Kevin James | (Dominica) | 23 Jan. 2009 | 1 Apr. 2011 | 11 | 371 | 55 | 17.66 | 0 | 1 | 6 | 4/38 | 28.66 | 0 | 0 | 3 | 0 | |
| 176 | Johnson Charles | (Saint Lucia) | 30 Jan. 2009 | 2 May 2013 | 21 | 671 | 66 | 17.81 | 0 | 3 | 1 | 1/27 | 80.00 | 0 | 0 | 30 | 0 | |
| 177 | Keddy Lesporis | (Saint Lucia) | 19 Feb. 2009 | 2 May 2013 | 25 | 1021 | 86 | 22.19 | 0 | 5 | – | – | – | – | – | 27 | 0 | |
| 178 | Alston Bobb | (Saint Vincent and the Grenadines) | 13 Mar. 2009 | 21 Mar. 2009 | 2 | 68 | 36 | 17.00 | 0 | 0 | 0 | 0/2 | – | 0 | 0 | 2 | 0 | |
| 179 | Tyrone Theophile | (Dominica) | 8 Jan. 2010 | 2 May 2013 | 17 | 591 | 91 | 19.70 | 0 | 3 | 0 | 0/0 | – | 0 | 0 | 16 | 0 | |
| 180 | Delorn Johnson | (Saint Vincent and the Grenadines) | 26 Feb. 2010 | 2 May 2013 | 12 | 193 | 51 | 17.54 | 0 | 1 | 28 | 4/34 | 22.78 | 0 | 0 | 9 | 0 | |
| 181 | Keron Cottoy | (Saint Vincent and the Grenadines) | 4 Feb. 2011 | 25 Feb. 2011 | 2 | 35 | 11 | 11.66 | 0 | 0 | 2 | 2/30 | 72.00 | 0 | 0 | 7 | 0 | |
| 182 | Atticus Browne | (Saint Vincent and the Grenadines) | 11 Mar. 2011 | 23 Mar. 2012 | 6 | 100 | 29 | 8.33 | 0 | 0 | – | – | – | – | – | 4 | 0 | |
| 183 | Dalton Polius | (Saint Lucia) | 17 Mar. 2011 | 10 Apr. 2013 | 10 | 327 | 77 | 20.43 | 0 | 1 | 14 | 5/50 | 30.14 | 1 | 0 | 6 | 0 | |
| 184 | Kesrick Williams | (Saint Vincent and the Grenadines) | 17 Mar. 2011 | 1 Apr. 2011 | 2 | 4 | 4* | 4.00 | 0 | 0 | 1 | 1/31 | 108.00 | 0 | 0 | 1 | 0 | |
| 185 | Kavem Hodge | (Dominica) | 9 Mar. 2012 | 9 Mar. 2012 | 1 | 1 | 1 | 0.50 | 0 | 0 | – | – | – | – | – | 0 | 0 | |
| 186 | Johann Jeremiah | (Grenada) | 15 March 2023 | 1 April 2023 | | | | | | | | | | | | | | |

== List of captains ==
Twenty-five players have captained the Windwards in at least one first-class match, with Grenadian Rawl Lewis' 69 matches between 2000 and 2009 the most of any one player. (Note: The captains for three matches—during the 1960–61, 1986–87, and 2000 seasons—are unaccounted for.) Of the team's captains, seven were Dominican, four Grenadian, three Saint Lucian, eight Vincentian, two Barbadian and one (Wilf Slack) English, although Vincentian by birth.

| No. | Name | Nat | First | Last | M | W | D | L | T | Win% | Ref |
|---|---|---|---|---|---|---|---|---|---|---|---|
| 1 | Frank Mason | (Saint Vincent and the Grenadines) | 21 December 1959 | 21 December 1959 | 1 | 0 | 0 | 1 | 0 | 0.00% | |
| 2 | Clem John | (Dominica) | 22 May 1965 | 25 November 1965 | 2 | 0 | 2 | 0 | 0 | 0.00% | |
| 3 | Evelyn Gresham | (Grenada) | 16 February 1967 | 27 March 1967 | 3 | 0 | 1 | 2 | 0 | 0.00% | |
| 4 | Hollis Bristol | (Saint Lucia) | 8 March 1968 | 8 March 1968 | 1 | 0 | 1 | 0 | 0 | 0.00% | |
| 5 | Irvine Shillingford | (Dominica) | 17 January 1969 | 2 April 1982 | 19 | 4 | 6 | 9 | 0 | 21.05% | |
| 6 | Mike Findlay | (Saint Vincent and the Grenadines) | 16 January 1970 | 6 April 1978 | 12 | 4 | 4 | 4 | 0 | 33.33% | |
| 7 | Norbert Phillip | (Dominica) | 21 January 1983 | 1 March 1985 | 16 | 5 | 8 | 3 | 0 | 31.25% | |
| 8 | Wilf Slack | (Saint Vincent and the Grenadines) (England) | 4 February 1983 | 4 February 1983 | 1 | 0 | 1 | 0 | 0 | 0.00% | |
| 9 | Lance John | (Saint Vincent and the Grenadines) | 17 January 1986 | 11 April 1987 | 8 | 2 | 1 | 5 | 0 | 25.00% | |
| 10 | Lockhart Sebastien | (Dominica) | 29 January 1988 | 29 January 1988 | 1 | 0 | 1 | 0 | 0 | 0.00% | |
| 11 | Winston Davis | (Saint Vincent and the Grenadines) | 4 February 1988 | 26 February 1988 | 4 | 0 | 0 | 4 | 0 | 0.00% | |
| 12 | Julian Charles | (Saint Lucia) | 26 January 1989 | 6 March 1992 | 21 | 2 | 9 | 10 | 0 | 9.52% | |
| 13 | Dawnley Joseph | (Saint Vincent and the Grenadines) | 29 January 1993 | 5 February 1999 | 22 | 2 | 6 | 14 | 0 | 9.09% | |
| 14 | Junior Murray | (Grenada) | 26 January 1996 | 12 February 1999 | 11 | 2 | 0 | 9 | 0 | 18.18% | |
| 15 | Rawl Lewis | (Grenada) | 7 January 2000 | 11 April 2009 | 69 | 17 | 20 | 32 | 0 | 24.64% | |
| 16 | Deighton Butler | (Saint Vincent and the Grenadines) | 4 January 2008 | 11 January 2008 | 2 | 0 | 0 | 2 | 0 | 0.00% | |
| 17 | Darren Sammy | (Saint Lucia) | 8 January 2010 | 6 March 2013 | 5 | 2 | 0 | 3 | 0 | 40.00% | |
| 18 | Devon Smith | (Grenada) | 29 January 2010 | 17 March 2017 | 5 | 0 | 1 | 4 | 0 | 0.00% | |
| 19 | Liam Sebastien | (Dominica) | 4 February 2011 | 7 April 2017 | 50 | 20 | 9 | 21 | 0 | 40.00% | |
| 20 | Lindon James | (Saint Vincent and the Grenadines) | 25 February 2011 | 9 February 2013 | 3 | 1 | 0 | 2 | 0 | 33.33% | |
| 21 | Tyrone Theophile | (Dominica) | 6 March 2015 | 18 January 2018 | 11 | 3 | 3 | 4 | 1 | 27.27% | |
| 22 | Kyle Mayers | (Barbados) | 15 April 2017 | 15 April 2017 | 1 | 0 | 0 | 1 | 0 | 0.00% | |
| 23 | Kirk Edwards | (Barbados) | 6 December 2018 | 7 February 2019 | 7 | 3 | 1 | 3 | 0 | 42.86% | |
| 24 | Sunil Ambris | (Saint Vincent and the Grenadines) | 21 February 2019 | 12 March 2020 | 7 | 1 | 1 | 5 | 0 | 14.29% | |
| 25 | Kavem Hodge | (Dominica) | 9 January 2020 | 27 February 2020 | 4 | 1 | 2 | 1 | 0 | 25.00% | |

== Notes and references ==
Notes
