= 2001–02 Red Stripe Bowl =

Cricket tournament

- Dates: 2 – 14 October 2001
- Administrator: WICB
- Cricket format: List A (50 overs)
- Tournament format(s): Group stage, finals
- Host(s): Guyana; Jamaica
- Champions: Guyana (7th title)
- Participants: 8
- Matches: 15
- Most runs: (Jamaica) Chris Gayle (242)
- Most wickets: (Barbados) Hendy Bryan (9)

The 2001–02 Red Stripe Bowl was the 28th season of what is now the Regional Super50, the domestic limited-overs cricket competition for the countries of the West Indies Cricket Board (WICB). It ran from 2 to 14 October 2001, with matches played in Guyana and Jamaica.

Eight teams contested the competition, four of which were competing for the first time. The two finalists from the previous season, the Leeward and Windward Islands, were each broken up into two teams. From the Leewards, Antigua and Barbuda entered separately, with players from the remaining countries competing for a "Rest of Leeward Islands" team. The Windwards team was split geographically, with players from Dominica and Saint Lucia competing for a "Northern Windward Islands" team and players from Grenada and Saint Vincent and the Grenadines competing for a "Southern Windward Islands" team. None of the new teams managed to make the finals, which were contested by the four traditional teams (Barbados, Guyana, Jamaica, and Trinidad and Tobago). Guyana eventually defeated Barbados in the final to win a seventh domestic one-day title. Jamaican batsman Chris Gayle and Barbadian bowler Hendy Bryan led the tournament in runs and wickets, respectively.

== Squads ==
Antigua and Barbuda	Barbados	Guyana	Jamaica
Dave Joseph (c); Sean Bailey; Bertel Baltimore; Ricky Christopher; Wilden Cornwall; Ridley Jacobs; Kerry Jeremy; Sylvester Joseph; Anthony Lake; Amwaa Prince; Goldwyn Prince; Curtis Roberts; Gregg Skepple; Ian Tittle; Earl Waldron	Sherwin Campbell (c); Sulieman Benn; Ian Bradshaw; Courtney Browne; Hendy Bryan; Pedro Collins; Adrian Griffith; Ryan Hinds; Floyd Reifer; Dale Richards; Philo Wallace; Kurt Wilkinson	Carl Hooper (c); Shivnarine Chanderpaul; Sewnarine Chattergoon; Lennox Cush; Narsingh Deonarine; Travis Dowlin; Andrew Gonsalves; Reon King; Neil McGarrell; Mahendra Nagamootoo; Vishal Nagamootoo; Ramnaresh Sarwan; Colin Stuart	Robert Samuels (c); Gareth Breese; Leon Garrick; Chris Gayle; Keith Hibbert; Wavell Hinds; Jermaine Lawson; Warran Medwynter; Brian Murphy; Nehemiah Perry; Ricardo Powell; Marlon Samuels; Laurie Williams
Northern Windwards	Rest of Leewards	Southern Windwards	Trinidad and Tobago
John Eugene (c); Kirsten Casimir; Cosier Charles; Alton Crafton; Sergio Fedee; Wayne Phillip; Gaspard Prospere; Wendell Roberts; Darren Sammy; Liam Sebastien; Shane Shillingford; Fernix Thomas; Balty Watt; Greg Wilson	Stuart Williams (c); Alex Adams; Omari Banks; Lesroy Irish; Shane Jeffers; Michael Martin; Michael Mills; Junie Mitchum; Runako Morton; Elsroy Powell; Ronald Powell; Tonito Willett; Davon Williams; Jason Williams; Stuart Williams	Rawl Lewis (c); Camilus Alexander; Deighton Butler; Denis Byam; Romel Currency; Troy George; Orlanzo Jackson; Reynold McLean; Kenroy Martin; McNeil Morgan; Junior Murray; Kenroy Peters; Devon Smith; John Sylvester	Dinanath Ramnarine (c); Marlon Black; Darryl Brown; Merv Dillon; Daren Ganga; Andy Jackson; Brian Lara; Keno Mason; Dave Mohammed; Lincoln Roberts; Richard Smith

== Group stage ==
=== Zone A ===
Team	Pld	W	L	T	NR	Pts	NRR
Trinidad and Tobago	3	3	0	0	0	6	+2.612
Jamaica	3	2	1	0	0	4	+0.978
Rest of Leewards	3	0	2	0	1	1	–1.193
Northern Windwards	3	0	2	0	1	1	–3.400

2 October 2001
Scorecard

Jamaica; 267/5 (50 overs)	v	Northern Windwards; 103 (41.2 overs)

Jamaica won by 164 runs
Alpart Sports Club Ground, Nain
Player of the match: Chris Gayle (Jam)

3 October 2001
Scorecard

Rest of Leewards; 174/8 (50 overs)	v	Trinidad and Tobago; 145/4 (34.4 overs)

Trinidad and Tobago won by 41 runs (D/L)
Alpart Sports Club Ground, Nain

- When play was halted, Trinidad and Tobago needed to have scored 105 runs to win.

5 October 2001
Scorecard

Jamaica; 209 (49.2 overs)	v	Rest of Leewards; 149/7 (50 overs)

Jamaica won by 60 runs
Chedwin Park, Spanish Town

5 October 2001
Scorecard

Trinidad and Tobago; 409/6 (50 overs)	v	Northern Windwards; 233/6 (50 overs)

Trinidad and Tobago won by 176 runs
Melbourne Park, Kingston

- Trinidad and Tobago made what was at the time the highest List A team total recorded in the West Indies, and the second-highest in all List A matches.

6 October 2001
Scorecard

Northern Windwards; 117 (34.1 overs)	v	Rest of Leewards

No result
Sabina Park, Kingston

7 October 2001
Scorecard

Trinidad and Tobago; 194 (35 overs)	v	Jamaica; 101/5 (34 overs)

Trinidad and Tobago won by 93 runs
Sabina Park, Kingston
Player of the match: Andy Jackson (Tri)

- The match was limited to 35 overs per side before the start of play; Jamaica's innings was subsequently reduced to 34 overs due to a slow over rate.

=== Zone B ===
Team	Pld	W	L	T	A	Pts	NRR
Guyana	3	3	0	0	0	6	+1.270
Barbados	3	2	1	0	0	4	+0.220
Antigua and Barbuda	3	1	2	0	0	2	–0.043
Southern Windwards	3	0	3	0	0	0	–1.385

2 October 2001
Scorecard

Antigua and Barbuda; 187/9 (50 overs)	v	Barbados; 189/4 (42 overs)

Barbados won by 6 wickets
Uitvlugt Community Centre Ground, Uitvlugt

3 October 2001
Scorecard

Guyana; 216/3 (30 overs)	v	Southern Windwards; 136/5 (30 overs)

Guyana won by 80 runs
Albion Sports Complex, Albion

- The match was limited to 30 overs per side before the start of play.

5 October 2001
Scorecard

Antigua and Barbuda; 270/8 (50 overs)	v	Southern Windwards; 191/9 (50 overs)

Antigua and Barbuda won by 79 runs
Diamond Community Ground, Georgetown

6 October 2001
Scorecard

Guyana; 253/7 (50 overs)	v	Barbados; 221 (46.5 overs)

Guyana won by 32 runs
Bourda, Georgetown

7 October 2001
Scorecard

Barbados; 178/9 (50 overs)	v	Southern Windwards; 157/9 (50 overs)

Barbados won by 21 runs
Enmore Recreation Ground, Enmore

7 October 2001
Scorecard

Antigua and Barbuda; 181/7 (50 overs)	v	Guyana; 185/2 (39.3 overs)

Guyana won by 8 wickets
Bourda, Georgetown

== Finals ==
=== Semi-finals ===
11 October 2001
Scorecard

Jamaica; 191/9 (50 overs)	v	Guyana; 191/9 (50 overs)

Match tied
Kaiser Sports Club, Discovery Bay

- Guyana proceeded to the final based on a higher group-stage position.

12 October 2001
Scorecard

Barbados; 219/5 (50 overs)	v	Trinidad and Tobago; 170/9 (50 overs)

Barbados won by 49 runs
Kaiser Sports Club, Discovery Bay

=== Final ===
14 October 2001
Scorecard

Barbados; 221/5 (50 overs)	v	Guyana; 223/4 (46.5 overs)

Guyana won by 6 wickets
Kaiser Sports Club, Discovery Bay

== Statistics ==
=== Most runs ===
The top five run scorers (total runs) are included in this table.

Player	Team	Runs	Inns	Avg	Highest	100s	50s
Chris Gayle	Jamaica	242	3	80.66	122	2	0
Andy Jackson	Trinidad and Tobago	220	4	55.00	112	1	1
Carl Hooper	Guyana	218	4	109.00	95*	0	1
Sewnarine Chattergoon	Guyana	202	5	50.50	102*	1	1
Ramnaresh Sarwan	Guyana	194	5	38.80	80	0	1

Source: CricketArchive

=== Most wickets ===
The top five wicket takers are listed in this table, listed by wickets taken and then by bowling average.

Player	Team	Overs	Wkts	Ave	SR	Econ	BBI
Hendy Bryan	Barbados	44.0	9	22.77	29.33	4.65	4/31
Mahendra Nagamootoo	Guyana	46.0	8	18.12	34.50	3.15	3/45
Ian Bradshaw	Barbados	48.0	8	20.75	36.00	3.45	3/29
Reon King	Guyana	38.5	8	25.37	29.12	5.22	3/51
Omari Banks	Rest of Leeward Islands	30.0	7	11.14	25.71	2.60	4/23

Source: CricketArchive

== See also ==
- 2001–02 Busta Cup
