= 2002–03 Red Stripe Bowl =

Cricket competition

- Dates: 14 August – 1 September 2002
- Administrator: WICB
- Cricket format: List A (50 overs)
- Tournament format(s): Group stage, finals
- Host(s): Jamaica; Saint Lucia
- Champions: Barbados (5th title)
- Participants: 10
- Matches: 23
- Most runs: (Barbados) Floyd Reifer (355)
- Most wickets: (Trinidad and Tobago) Merv Dillon (Jamaica) Daren Powell (13)

The 2002–03 Red Stripe Bowl was the 29th edition of what is now the Regional Super50, the domestic limited-overs cricket competition for the countries of the West Indies Cricket Board (WICB). It ran from 14 August to 1 September 2002, with matches played in Jamaica and Saint Lucia.

Ten teams contested the competition, including several first-time participants. For a second consecutive season, the Leeward and Windward Islands teams were each broken up into two teams – Antigua and Barbuda and Saint Vincent and the Grenadines entered separate teams, with players from the remaining countries playing for "Rest of Leeward Islands" and "Rest of Windward Islands" teams. A University of the West Indies team entered for the first time, while Canada were invited as a guest team. The semi-finals and final of the competition were all held in Discovery Bay, Jamaica, with Barbados eventually defeating Jamaica in the final to win their fifth domestic one-day title (and first since the 1987–88 season). Barbadian batsman Floyd Reifer led the tournament in runs, while Merv Dillon of Trinidad and Tobago and Daren Powell of Jamaica were the equal leading wicket-takers.

== Squads ==
Antigua and Barbuda	Barbados	Canada	Guyana	Jamaica
Ridley Jacobs (c); Sean Bailey; Bertel Baltimore; Wilden Cornwall; Kerry Jeremy; Sylvester Joseph; Anthony Lake; Amwaa Prince; Mali Richards; Curtis Roberts; Adam Sanford; Carl Simon; Gregg Skepple; Ian Tittle; Earl Waldron	Courtney Browne (c); Sulieman Benn; Ian Bradshaw; Pedro Collins; Corey Collymore; Vasbert Drakes; Ryan Hinds; Antonio Mayers; Floyd Reifer; Dale Richards; Philo Wallace; Kurt Wilkinson	Joseph Harris (c); Ashish Bagai; Ian Billcliff; Desmond Chumney; Austin Codrington; Melvin Croning; John Davison; Nicholas de Groot; Davis Joseph; Ishwar Maraj; Abdool Samad; Abdul Sattaur; Barry Seebaran	Carl Hooper (c); Shivnarine Chanderpaul; Sewnarine Chattergoon; Lennox Cush; Narsingh Deonarine; Travis Dowlin; Rayon Griffith; Reon King; Neil McGarrell; Mahendra Nagamootoo; Vishal Nagamootoo; Ramnaresh Sarwan; Colin Stuart	Robert Samuels (c); David Bernard; Gareth Breese; Leon Garrick; Chris Gayle; Keith Hibbert; Wavell Hinds; Jermaine Lawson; Daren Powell; Ricardo Powell; Marlon Samuels; Laurie Williams
Rest of Leeward Islands	Rest of Windward Islands	Saint Vincent and the Grenadines	Trinidad and Tobago	(Cricket West Indies) University of the West Indies
Alex Adams (c); Terrence Adams; Omari Banks; Colin Cannonier; Bront DeFreitas; Lanville Harrigan; Chaka Hodge; Shane Jeffers; Michael Martin; Runako Morton; Elsroy Powell; Carl Tuckett; Tonito Willett; Jason Williams	Rawl Lewis (c); Kirsten Casimir; Raymond Casimir; Alton Crafton; John Eugene; Kevile George; Troy George; Danny Harris; Wayne Phillip; Darren Sammy; Shane Shillingford; John Sylvester; Fernix Thomas; Balty Watt	Uzzah Pope (c); Alston Bobb; Denis Byam; Cameron Cuffy; Romel Currency; Calvert Hooper; Orlanzo Jackson; Dawnley Joseph; Kenroy Martin; Nixon McLean; Reynold McLean; Kenroy Peters; Bertram Stapleton	Daren Ganga (c); Shazam Babwah; Samuel Badree; Marlon Black; Dwayne Bravo; Darryl Brown; Merv Dillon; Andy Jackson; Brian Lara; Dinanath Ramnarine; Lendl Simmons; Richard Smith; Rodney Sooklal	Dave Cumberbatch (c); Nicholas Austin; Dary Balgobin; Maurice Clarke; Andre Coley; Imtiaz Easahak; Jason Haynes; Sanjeev Maharaj; Llewellyn Meggs; Sadique Munroe; Jason Parris; Sheldon Phillips; Andrew Richardson; Calvin Watson

== Group stage ==
=== Zone A ===
Team	Pld	W	L	T	NR	Pts	NRR
Jamaica	4	4	0	0	0	8	+1.788
Barbados	4	3	1	0	0	6	+2.012
St Vincent	4	1	3	0	0	2	–0.620
Rest of Leewards	4	1	3	0	0	2	–1.416
(Cricket West Indies) UWI	4	1	3	0	0	2	–2.072

14 August 2002
Scorecard

UWI (Cricket West Indies); 269/7 (50 overs)	v	St Vincent; 244/9 (50 overs)

UWI won by 25 runs
Old Harbour Road Cricket Ground, Port Esquivel

15 August 2002
Scorecard

Rest of Leewards; 125 (43.4 overs)	v	Jamaica; 128/1 (26.4 overs)

Jamaica won by 9 wickets
Sabina Park, Kingston
Player of the match: Leon Garrick (Jam)

16 August 2002
Scorecard

Barbados; 284/2 (50 overs)	v	(Cricket West Indies) UWI; 182 (41.4 overs)

Barbados won by 67 runs
Chedwin Park, Spanish Town

17 August 2002
Scorecard

Jamaica; 171 (47.4 overs)	v	Saint Vincent and the Grenadines; 117 (41.3 overs)

Jamaica won by 54 runs
Alpart Sports Club Ground, Nain
Player of the match: Gareth Breese (Jam)

18 August 2002
Scorecard

Barbados; 323/5 (50 overs)	v	Rest of Leewards; 130 (33.5 overs)

Barbados won by 193 runs
Melbourne Park, Kingston

- Barbados' Kurt Wilkinson was given out hit the ball twice, the first instance of that form of dismissal in West Indian domestic cricket.

20 August 2002
Scorecard

UWI (Cricket West Indies); 140 (49.3 overs)	v	Rest of Leewards; 141/1 (24 overs)

Rest of Leewards won by 9 wickets
Sir Frank Worrell Cricket Ground, Mona

22 August 2002
Scorecard

UWI (Cricket West Indies); 112 (38.3 overs)	v	Jamaica; 115/0 (16.2 overs)

Jamaica won by 10 wickets
Alpart Sports Club Ground, Nain
Player of the match: Chris Gayle (Jam)

23 August 2002
Scorecard

Barbados; 310/7 (50 overs)	v	St Vincent; 201/9 (50 overs)

Barbados won by 109 runs
Chedwin Park, Spanish Town

24 August 2002
Scorecard

Jamaica; 307/5 (50 overs)	v	Barbados; 287/7 (47 overs)

Jamaica won by 20 runs
Sabina Park, Kingston

- Barbados were limited to 47 overs due to their slow over rate.

25 August 2002
Scorecard

St Vincent; 246/9 (50 overs)	v	Rest of Leewards; 182/7 (50 overs)

St Vincent won by 64 runs
Chedwin Park, Spanish Town

=== Zone B ===
Team	Pld	W	L	T	NR	Pts	NRR
Guyana	4	4	0	0	0	8	+0.653
Trinidad and Tobago	4	3	1	0	0	6	+1.081
Canada	4	2	2	0	0	4	–0.706
Antigua and Barbuda	4	1	3	0	0	2	–0.272
Rest of Windwards	4	0	4	0	0	0	–0.751

14 August 2002
Scorecard

Canada; 172 (49.4 overs)	v	Antigua and Barbuda; 138 (40.2 overs)

Canada won by 34 runs
Beausejour Stadium, Gros Islet

15 August 2002
Scorecard

Rest of Windwards; 108 (44.5 overs)	v	Trinidad and Tobago; 109/7 (41 overs)

Trinidad and Tobago won by 3 wickets
Beausejour Stadium, Gros Islet

16 August 2002
Scorecard

Guyana; 188/9 (50 overs)	v	Canada; 160 (47.5 overs)

Guyana won by 28 runs
Mindoo Phillip Park, Castries

17 August 2002
Scorecard

Trinidad and Tobago; 212/8 (50 overs)	v	Antigua and Barbuda; 205 (49.4 overs)

Trinidad and Tobago won by 7 runs
Beausejour Stadium, Gros Islet

18 August 2002
Scorecard

Guyana; 192/9 (50 overs)	v	Rest of Windwards; 129 (43.4 overs)

Guyana won by 63 runs
Beausejour Stadium, Gros Islet

21 August 2002
Scorecard

Rest of Windwards; 138 (45 overs)	v	Canada; 139/9 (40.2 overs)

Canada won by 1 wicket
Beausejour Stadium, Gros Islet

22 August 2002
Scorecard

Trinidad and Tobago; 228/9 (50 overs)	v	Guyana; 231/9 (49.5 overs)

Guyana won by 1 wicket
Beausejour Stadium, Gros Islet

23 August 2002
Scorecard

Rest of Windwards; 148 (42.1 overs)	v	Antigua and Barbuda; 149/6 (43.4 overs)

Antigua and Barbuda won by 4 wickets
Beausejour Stadium, Gros Islet

24 August 2002
Scorecard

Trinidad and Tobago; 230 (49.5 overs)	v	Canada; 55 (26.5 overs)

Trinidad and Tobago won by 175 runs
Beausejour Stadium, Gros Islet

25 August 2002
Scorecard

Guyana; 204/9 (50 overs)	v	Antigua and Barbuda; 168 (46.5 overs)

Guyana won by 36 runs
Beausejour Stadium, Gros Islet

== Finals ==
=== Semi-finals ===
29 August 2002
Scorecard

Trinidad and Tobago; 147 (48 overs)	v	Jamaica; 151/3 (29.1 overs)

Jamaica won by 7 wickets
Kaiser Sports Club, Discovery Bay

30 August 2002
Scorecard

Guyana; 162 (44.5 overs)	v	Barbados; 143/5 (34.4 overs)

Barbados won by 5 wickets (D/L)
Kaiser Sports Club, Discovery Bay

=== Final ===
1 September 2002
Scorecard

Barbados; 241/8 (50 overs)	v	Jamaica; 208 (46.2 overs)

Barbados won by 33 runs
Kaiser Sports Club, Discovery Bay
Attendance: 7,500
Player of the match: Floyd Reifer (Bar)

== Statistics ==
=== Most runs ===
The top five run scorers (total runs) are included in this table.

Player	Team	Runs	Inns	Avg	Highest	100s	50s
Floyd Reifer	Barbados	355	6	118.33	86*	0	4
Philo Wallace	Barbados	248	6	41.33	87	0	1
Ryan Hinds	Barbados	245	6	40.83	81	0	2
Chris Gayle	Jamaica	229	6	45.80	77*	0	2
Wavell Hinds	Jamaica	213	5	53.25	103	1	1

Source: CricketArchive

=== Most wickets ===
The top five wicket takers are listed in this table, listed by wickets taken and then by bowling average.

Player	Team	Overs	Wkts	Ave	SR	Econ	BBI
Merv Dillon	Trinidad and Tobago	45.0	13	12.15	20.76	3.51	4/25
Daren Powell	Jamaica	47.1	13	13.76	21.76	3.79	5/23
Mahendra Nagamootoo	Guyana	41.2	11	12.45	22.54	3.31	4/30
Fernix Thomas	Rest of Windwards	38.0	11	12.90	20.72	3.73	5/33
Chris Gayle	Jamaica	59.0	11	14.90	32.18	2.77	3/18

Source: CricketArchive
