= Warrican =

Warrican is a surname. Notable people with the surname include:

- Irvin Warrican (1965–2022), Vincentian cricketer
- Jomel Warrican (born 1992), Vincentian cricketer
