= Clyde Telesford =

Grenadian cricketer (born 1974)

Personal information
- Born: 12 July 1974 (age 52); Grenada
- Source: Cricinfo, 25 November 2020

Clyde Telesford (born 12 July 1974) is a Grenadian cricketer. He played in one first-class match for the Windward Islands in 2001/02 and four Twenty20 matches for Grenada in 2006 and 2008.

== See also ==
- List of Windward Islands first-class cricketers
