= Leroy Lewis =

Leroy Lewis may refer to:

- Leroy Lewis (footballer) (1945-2001), Costa Rican footballer
- Leroy Lewis (cricketer) (born 1963), Dominican cricketer
