= Bront =

Bront is a given name. Notable people with the name include:

- Bront Bird (born 1989), American football player
- Bront DeFreitas (born 1978), British Virgin Islands cricketer
- Bront Palarae (born 1978), Malaysian actor, director, screenwriter, and producer
