= Frederick Thorp =

Frederick Thorp or Thorpe may refer to:

- Freddie Thorp (born 1994), British actor
- Frederick Thorpe (cricketer) (1954–2026), Saint Lucian cricketer
- Frederick Thorpe (politician) (also spelled Thorp), American politician
