= Tibbles Moore =

Grenadian cricketer (born 1974)

Personal information
- Born: 14 September 1974 (age 52); Grenada
- Source: Cricinfo, 25 November 2020

Tibbles Moore (born 14 September 1974) is a Grenadian cricketer. He played in one first-class and three List A matches for the Windward Islands in 1999/00.

== See also ==
- List of Windward Islands first-class cricketers
