= Eldon Bramble =

Vincentian cricketer

Personal information
- Born: 1931; Saint Vincent
- Died: 12 May 1977 (aged 45–46); Barbados
- Source: Cricinfo, 26 November 2020

Eldon Bramble (1931 – 12 May 1977) was a Vincentian cricketer. He played in one first-class match for the Windward Islands in 1959/60.

== See also ==
- List of Windward Islands first-class cricketers
