= Montgomery Warner =

Vincentian cricketer (born 1955)

Personal information
- Born: 1 December 1955 (age 70); Saint Vincent
- Source: Cricinfo, 26 November 2020

Montgomery Warner (born 1 December 1955) is a Vincentian cricketer. He played in two first-class and seven List A matches for the Windward Islands from 1978 to 1981.

== See also ==
- List of Windward Islands first-class cricketers
