= Wesley Thomas (cricketer) =

Grenadian cricketer (1964–1994)

Personal information
- Born: 26 November 1964; Grenada
- Died: 1 February 1994 (aged 29)
- Source: Cricinfo, 25 November 2020

Wesley Thomas (26 November 1964 – 1 February 1994) was a Grenadian cricketer. He played in twenty-one first-class and eleven List A matches for the Windward Islands from 1984 to 1993. He died from liver cancer at the age of 29.

== See also ==
- List of Windward Islands first-class cricketers
