= Joey Pierre =

Dominican cricketer (born 1963)

Personal information
- Full name: Andrew Jones Pierre
- Born: 5 October 1963 (age 63); Dominica
- Source: Cricinfo, 25 November 2020

Joey Pierre (born 5 October 1963) is a Dominican cricketer. He played in sixteen first-class and twelve List A matches for the Windward Islands from 1987 to 1997.

== See also ==
- List of Windward Islands first-class cricketers
