= Mervin Durand =

Dominican cricketer (born 1960)

Personal information
- Born: 27 August 1960 (age 66); Dominica
- Source: Cricinfo, 25 November 2020

Mervin Durand (born 27 August 1960) is a Dominican cricketer. He played in one List A and four first-class matches for the Windward Islands from 1989 to 1991.

== See also ==
- List of Windward Islands first-class cricketers
