= Dawnley Joseph =

West Indian cricketer

Personal information
- Full name: Dawnley Alister Joseph
- Born: 28 August 1966 (age 60); Stubbs, Saint Vincent
- Batting: Right-handed
- Bowling: Right-arm medium Right-arm off spin

Domestic team information
- Years: Team
- 1987–2000: Windward Islands
- Source: CricketArchive, 28 December 2015

Dawnley Alister Joseph (born 28 August 1966) is a former Vincentian cricketer who played for the Windward Islands in West Indian domestic cricket. He was a right-handed top-order batsman.

A former West Indies under-19s player, Joseph made his first-class debut for the Windwards in March 1987, in a one-off fixture against Barbados, and his Shell Shield debut shortly after. He scored his maiden first-class century in the 1987–88 Red Stripe Cup, an innings of 109 against Jamaica. In the following season's Geddes Grant Shield, Joseph scored his first List A century, an innings of 108 that again came against Jamaica.

Joseph finished the 1988–89 Red Stripe Cup with 388 runs from five matches, fourth in the competition and the most for the Windwards. At the beginning of the following season, he was selected to tour Zimbabwe with a Young West Indies team. The team, captained by Brian Lara, played a series of fixtures against the Zimbabwean national side. In the last of three first-class matches on tour, Joseph made what was to be his highest first-class score, 149 from 188 balls. However, after that he did not make another century until the 1994–95 Red Stripe Cup, when he finished as the Windwards' highest run-scorer. He had been runner-up to Junior Murray the previous season.

Against Bermuda in the 1997–98 Red Stripe Bowl, Joseph hit 153 not out opening the batting with Alton Crafton. His innings set a new record for the highest individual score in List A cricket in the West Indies, beating Desmond Haynes' previous mark of 152 not out set during the 1988–89 season. Several other players have since made higher scores. Joseph played his last first-class matches for the Windwards during the 1998–99 Busta Cup, and his final limited-overs matches for the team in the 2000–01 Red Stripe Bowl. However, the Saint Vincent and the Grenadines team were invited to compete separately in the 2002–03 Red Stripe Bowl, with Joseph playing one final season in that competition. He also appeared for Saint Vincent at the 2006 Stanford 20/20, at the age of 39.

In June 2018, he won the WIPA Lifetime Award at the annual Cricket West Indies' Awards.
