= Jerome Mellow =

Dominican cricketer

Personal information
- Born: 1937 (age 88–89); Dominica
- Source: Cricinfo, 25 November 2020

Jerome Mellow (born 1937) is a Dominican cricketer. He played in seven first-class matches for the Windward Islands from 1964 to 1967.

== See also ==
- List of Windward Islands first-class cricketers
