= Vincent Elwin =

Dominican cricketer (born 1946)

Personal information
- Born: 11 December 1946 (age 79); Dominica
- Source: Cricinfo, 25 November 2020

Vincent Elwin (born 11 December 1946) is a Dominican cricketer. He played in three first-class matches for the Windward Islands in 1969/70 and 1970/71.

== See also ==
- List of Windward Islands first-class cricketers
