= Kenny Hobson =

Grenadian cricketer (1957–2006)

Personal information
- Full name: Kenneth Augustine Hobson
- Born: 24 October 1957; Grenada
- Died: 2 December 2006 (aged 49)
- Source: Cricinfo, 25 November 2020

Kenneth Augustine Hobson (24 October 1957 – 2 December 2006) was a Grenadian cricketer. He played in two first-class and four List A matches for the Windward Islands from 1980 to 1984.

== See also ==
- List of Windward Islands first-class cricketers
