= Javan Etienne =

Dominican cricketer (born 1962)

Personal information
- Born: 22 August 1962 (age 64); Dominica
- Source: Cricinfo, 25 November 2020

Javan Etienne (born 22 August 1962) is a Dominican cricketer. He played in twenty-eight first-class and six List A matches for the Windward Islands from 1983 to 1990.

== See also ==
- List of Windward Islands first-class cricketers
