= Alex Adams (cricketer) =

Anguillan cricketer (born 1975)

Personal information
- Full name: Fabian Alex Adams
- Born: 7 January 1975 (age 51); The Valley, Anguilla
- Batting: Right-handed
- Bowling: Right-arm off spin
- Role: Opening batsman

Domestic team information
- Years: Team
- 1997–2004: Leeward Islands
- 2001–2003: Rest of Leeward Islands
- Source: CricketArchive, 1 January 2016

Fabian Alex Adams (born 7 January 1975) is a former Anguillan cricketer who played for the Leeward Islands in West Indian domestic cricket. A right-handed opening batsman, he was the first Anguillan to score a first-class hundred.

Adams made his first-class debut for the Leewards in May 1997, playing against Guyana in the 1996–97 Red Stripe Cup. He was out for five runs in the first innings, but made 69 not out in the second, opening the batting with Junie Mitchum. In February 2003, Adams made 103 not out against West Indies B, becoming the first Anguillan to score a first-class century. He finished the 2002–03 Carib Beer Cup season with 473 runs from seven games, behind only Stuart Williams for the Leewards. In the 2002–03 Red Stripe Bowl, in Williams' absence, Adams served as captain of the Rest of Leeward Islands team that played during Antigua and Barbuda's period as a separate participant. He played his final matches for the Leewards in the 2004–05 Regional Four Day Competition, aged 29. In 2006, Adams also played a single match for Anguilla in the Stanford 20/20 tournament, against Barbados. He later played in the 50th celebration match of cricket in Anguilla in June 2017, where he served as the opening batsman alongside Lendel Richardson against the Legends of the West Indies, which Anguilla won.

== Personal life ==
Adams is married to health professional Maeza Demis-Adams. Together they have a son, Dimitri Adams, who went to Southampton University to study business administration and also play at Hampshire Cricket Academy.
