= Joseph Parillon =

Dominican cricketer (born 1979)

Personal information
- Born: 4 January 1979 (age 47); Dominica
- Source: Cricinfo, 25 November 2020

Joseph Parillon (born 4 January 1979) is a Dominican cricketer. He played in seven first-class matches for the Windward Islands in 1997/98 and 1998/99.

== See also ==
- List of Windward Islands first-class cricketers
