= Eusfield John =

Dominican cricketer (born 1952)

Personal information
- Born: 9 September 1952 (age 74); Dominica
- Source: Cricinfo, 25 November 2020

Eusfield John (born 9 September 1952) is a Dominican cricketer. He played in three first-class and two List A matches for the Windward Islands in 1976/77.

== See also ==
- List of Windward Islands first-class cricketers
