= Diamond Community Ground =

Cricket ground in Diamond, Guyana

- Interactive map of Diamond Community Ground
- Location: Diamond, Guyana
- Country: Guyana
- Coordinates: 6.7119°N 58.1915°W
- As of 22 April 2022; Source: Ground profile

Diamond Community Ground is a cricket ground in Diamond, Guyana.

== History ==
Located adjacent to the Demerara River in the town of Diamond, the ground has played host as a neutral venue to one List A one-day match between Antigua and Barbuda and the Southern Windward Islands in the 2001–02 Red Stripe Bowl. In a match which Antigua and Barbuda won by 79 runs, with the best performances in the match coming from Antigua and Barbuda players: Dave Joseph top-scoring with the bat with 74 runs and Wilden Cornwall taking 4 for 40 with the ball.

== See also ==
- List of cricket grounds in the West Indies
