= Hollis Bristol =

Saint Lucian cricketer

Hollis D.D. Bristol SLPM, OBE
Personal information
- Full name: Hollis D.D. Bristol
- Born: 1 January 1934 (age 92); Castries, Saint Lucia, West Indies
- Batting: Right-handed
- Role: Opening batsman

Domestic team information
- Years: Team
- 1967–1968: Windward Islands
- Source: CricketArchive, 26 February 2016

Hollis D.D. Bristol, SLPM, OBE is a former Saint Lucian cricketer who played for the Windward Islands in West Indian domestic cricket. He played as a right-handed opening batsman.

At 15 years old, Bristol was selected on the Saint Mary's College (Saint Lucia) team in both cricket and football and was a member of the College team for the Windward Island Inter-schools series.

Bristol made his first-class debut in February 1967, playing against Trinidad and Tobago during the 1966–67 Shell Shield season. The following month, in a friendly against the Leeward Islands, he scored 86 runs opening the batting with Henry Elwin, making what was to be his highest first-class score. In March 1968, Bristol was appointed captain of the Windwards for a one-off match against the touring English team, played at his home ground (Victoria Park, Castries). He was the first Saint Lucian to captain the team, but did not play again at first-class level.

When Bristol no longer participated actively in sports, he served as deputy West indies selector under Frankie Thomas of St. Vincent. He is credited of having paved the way for Mike Findlay of Saint Vincent and the Grenadines and Grayson Shillingford of Dominica to make the West Indies team.
