= Roy Marshall (Dominican cricketer) =

Dominican cricketer

Personal information
- Full name: Roy Ashworth Marshall
- Born: 1 April 1965 (age 61); Saint Joseph Parish, Dominica
- Batting: Right-handed
- Bowling: Left-arm orthodox

Domestic team information
- Years: Team
- 1985–2000: Windward Islands
- 1992: Leeward Islands
- Source: CricketArchive, 17 January 2016

Roy Ashworth Marshall (born 1 April 1965) is a former Dominican cricketer whose career in top-level West Indian domestic cricket spanned from 1985 to 2008. His primary team was the Windward Islands, but he also played a single season for the Leeward Islands, as well as representing Dominica at the 2006 and 2008 Stanford 20/20 tournaments.

Marshall was born in Dominica's Saint Joseph Parish. He made his first-class debut for the Windward Islands in February 1985, playing against Barbados during the 1984–85 Shell Shield season. Marshall played five matches for the Windwards across his first two seasons, but then had a gap of almost six years between first-class appearances. He returned to that level during the 1991–92 season, playing for the Leewards rather than the Windwards, and consequently became one of the few players to play for both teams. (Note: Others include Shane Julien, Richie Richardson, and Adam Sanford.) Marshall returned to the Windwards for the 1992–93 season, and was a regular in the team throughout the remainder of the 1990s.

A slow left-arm orthodox bowler and competent lower-order batsman, Marshall took his maiden first-class five-wicket haul in the opening match of the 1992–93 Red Stripe Cup, picking up 6/41 against Trinidad and Tobago. His best bowling figures came against Jamaica during the 1995–96 season, when he took 7/99 in the second innings (and 10/176 for the match). Marshall finished that season as his team's leading wicket-taker, and behind only Trinidad and Tobago's Rajindra Dhanraj overall. He also led his team in wickets during the 1996–97 and 1998–99 seasons, in the latter taking a second ten-wicket haul (4/19 and 6/32 for match figures of 10/51).

Marshall scored his only first-class century in February 1996, making 112 against Trinidad and Tobago from sixth in the batting order. He had a higher batting average in limited-overs competitions than at first-class level (27.07 compared to 18.29), with his highest score being 77 not out against Jamaica during the 1993–94 Geddes Grant Shield season. Marshall played his last matches for the Windwards in the 2000–01 Red Stripe Bowl, aged 35. He finished with 144 wickets from 53 first-class appearances. In 2006, aged 41, Marshall was selected in Dominica's squad for the inaugural Stanford 20/20 competition, playing against Grenada. He returned for the 2008 edition, playing against the British Virgin Islands and Barbados, and in the first of those games scored 40 runs from 26 balls, for which he was named man of the match.
