= Lee Stephen =

Saint Lucian cricketer (born 1975)

Personal information
- Born: 29 October 1975 (age 51); Saint Lucia
- Source: Cricinfo, 25 November 2020

Lee Stephen (born 29 October 1975) is a Saint Lucian cricketer. He played in two first-class and two List A matches for the Windward Islands in 1996/97.

== See also ==
- List of Windward Islands first-class cricketers
