= Victor Joseph =

Grenadian cricketer (born 1951)

Personal information
- Born: 21 February 1951 (age 75); Grenada
- Source: Cricinfo, 25 November 2020

Victor Joseph (born 21 February 1951) is a Grenadian cricketer. He played in six first-class and two List A matches for the Windward Islands from 1972 to 1976.

== See also ==
- List of Windward Islands first-class cricketers
