= Zepton Greaves =

Vincentian cricketer (born 1942)

Personal information
- Born: 10 December 1942 (age 83); Dorsetshire Hill, Saint Vincent
- Source: Cricinfo, 26 November 2020

Zepton Greaves (born 10 December 1942) is a Vincentian cricketer. He played in two first-class matches for the Windward Islands in 1972/73.

== See also ==
- List of Windward Islands first-class cricketers
