= Wayne Phillip =

Dominican cricketer (born 1977)

Personal information
- Born: 25 November 1977 (age 48); Saint David Parish, Dominica
- Batting: Left-handed
- Role: Wicket-keeper

Domestic team information
- Years: Team
- 1997–2000: Windward Islands
- 2001: West Indies B
- 2001: Northern Windward Islands
- 2002: Rest of Windward Islands
- Source: CricketArchive, 8 March 2016

Wayne Phillip (born 25 November 1977) is a former Dominican cricketer who represented the Windward Islands and several other teams in West Indian domestic cricket. He played as a wicket-keeper, and batted left-handed.

Phillip was born in Grand Fond, in Dominica's Saint David Parish. He made his senior Windward Islands debut at the age of 19, playing in the 1997–98 Red Stripe Bowl (a limited-overs competition). Phillip made his first-class the following season, playing for West Indies A against Jamaica, and was subsequently selected for a West Indies A tour of India, as a back-up wicket-keeper to Courtney Browne. He again played for West Indies A during the 1999–00 season, when India A toured, and was then chosen for the West Indian senior team's 2000 tour of England. Selected as a reserve for Ridley Jacobs, he did not play in any of the international matches on tour, but did feature in a number of games against English county teams.

In the 2000–01 Busta Cup, Phillip played for West Indies B, a development team. That was his last season at first-class level. However, he continued to play regional one-day cricket for another two seasons, representing the Northern Windward Islands in the 2001–02 Red Stripe Bowl and the Rest of Windward Islands team in the 2002–03 Red Stripe Bowl. Phillip briefly returned to top-level West Indian cricket in 2006, when he represented the Dominican national team at the Stanford 20/20. His sole appearance came in Dominica's loss to Grenada, which knocked the team out of the tournament.
