= Joseph Guiste =

Dominican cricketer (born 1959)

Personal information
- Born: 4 April 1959 (age 67); Dominica
- Source: Cricinfo, 25 November 2020

Joseph Guiste (born 4 April 1959) is a Dominican cricketer. He played in one first-class and five List A matches for the Windward Islands in 1979/80 and 1980/81.

== See also ==
- List of Windward Islands first-class cricketers
