= Balty Watt =

Dominican cricketer (born 1975)

Personal information
- Full name: Balthazar Michael Watt
- Born: 12 April 1975 (age 51); Dominica
- Batting: Right-handed
- Bowling: Right-arm medium

Domestic team information
- Years: Team
- 1997–2001: Windward Islands
- 2001: Northern Windward Islands
- 2002: Rest of Windward Islands
- Source: CricketArchive, 23 January 2016

Balthazar Michael "Balty" Watt (born 12 April 1975) is a Dominican former cricketer who played for the Windward Islands in West Indian domestic cricket. He played as a right-handed middle-order batsman.

A former West Indies under-19s player, Watt made his first-class debut for the Windwards in the 1996–97 Red Stripe Cup. His highest score in 23 first-class appearances was 86 not out, made against Jamaica in January 1998, and his final appearance for the Windwards came in January 2001. In the 2001–02 and 2002–03 seasons of the Red Stripe Bowl, a limited-overs competition, Watt played for the Northern Windward Islands and Rest of Windward Islands teams, respectively. He also represented Dominica in the 2006 Stanford 20/20 tournament, playing a single match against Grenada.
