= Thomas Kentish =

Dominican cricketer (born 1957)

Personal information
- Full name: Thomas Zephaniah Kentish
- Born: 15 December 1957 (age 68); Saint George Parish, Dominica
- Batting: Right-handed
- Bowling: Right-arm off spin

Domestic team information
- Years: Team
- 1977–1992: Windward Islands

Career statistics
Competition	FC	List A
Matches	56	33
Runs scored	949	88
Batting average	14.60	8.00
100s/50s	0/0	0/0
Top score	40	16
Balls bowled	10931	1668
Wickets	135	26
Bowling average	32.16	33.61
5 wickets in innings	4	0
10 wickets in match	0	0
Best bowling	6/69	4/12
Catches/stumpings	41/0	13/0
- Source: Cricinfo, 24 October 2022

Thomas Zephaniah Kentish (born 15 December 1957) is a former Dominican cricketer who played for the Windward Islands in West Indian domestic cricket. He was a right-arm off spin bowler.

== Playing career ==
Born and raised in Goodwill, a suburb of Roseau, Kentish made his first-class debut for the Windwards in January 1977, in what was then the annual fixture against the Leeward Islands. He did not make his Shell Shield debut for the team until the 1981–82 season, but after that remained a regular in the team throughout the 1980s and into the early 1990s. Kentish took his maiden first-class five-wicket haul in only his second Shell Shield match, returning figures of 6/69 against Barbados. He took another two five-wicket hauls during the 1984–85 season, taking 20 wickets from five matches to finish as his team's leading wicket-taker (and seventh in the overall competition). The previous season, he had been runner-up to Stanley Hinds in the Windwards' wicket-taking. Kentish played his last matches for the Windward Islands during the 1991–92 season, aged 34. In his final limited-overs fixture, against Guyana, he took a career-best 4/12 from 7.4 overs, which saw him named man of the match.

== Legacy ==
On 24 June 2022, the East stand at Windsor Park was renamed in Kentish's honour.
