= John Patrick (cricketer) =

Grenadian cricketer (born 1955)

Personal information
- Born: 22 September 1955 (age 71); Grenada
- Source: Cricinfo, 25 November 2020

John Patrick (born 22 September 1955) is a Grenadian cricketer. He played in one first-class and one List A match for the Windward Islands in 1977/78.

== See also ==
- List of Windward Islands first-class cricketers
