= Mervyn Thomas =

Dominican cricketer (born 1965)

Personal information
- Born: 24 May 1965 (age 61); Dominica
- Source: Cricinfo, 25 November 2020

Mervyn Thomas (born 24 May 1965) is a Dominican cricketer. He played in four first-class and six List A matches for the Windward Islands from 1992 to 1996.

== See also ==
- List of Windward Islands first-class cricketers
