= Joseph Jack =

Vincentian cricketer (born 1953)

Personal information
- Born: 24 July 1953 (age 73); Saint Vincent
- Source: Cricinfo, 26 November 2020

Joseph Jack (born 24 July 1953) is a Vincentian cricketer. He played in two first-class and nine List A matches for the Windward Islands from 1979 to 1982.

== See also ==
- List of Windward Islands first-class cricketers
