= Douglas Haynes (cricketer) =

Vincentian cricketer (born 1953)

Personal information
- Born: 18 January 1953 (age 73); Saint Vincent
- Source: Cricinfo, 26 November 2020

Douglas Haynes (born 18 January 1953) is a Vincentian cricketer. He played in one List A and four first-class matches for the Windward Islands in 1971/72.

== See also ==
- List of Windward Islands first-class cricketers
