= Rupert Polius =

Saint Lucian cricketer (born 1944)

Personal information
- Born: 5 November 1944 (age 82); Saint Lucia
- Source: Cricinfo, 25 November 2020

Rupert Polius (born 5 November 1944) is a Saint Lucian cricketer. He played in five first-class matches for the Windward Islands from 1968 to 1973.

== See also ==
- List of Windward Islands first-class cricketers
