= Elsroy Powell =

Kittitian cricketer (born 1981)

Personal information
- Full name: Elsroy Junior Powell
- Born: 9 November 1981 (age 45); Saint Kitts
- Batting: Right-handed
- Bowling: Right-arm fast-medium
- Role: All-rounder

Domestic team information
- Years: Team
- 2001–2003: Rest of Leeward Islands
- 2002: West Indies B
- 2004–2013: Leeward Islands
- Source: Cricinfo, 28 December 2015

Elsroy Junior Powell (born 9 November 1981) is a Kittitian cricketer who has played for several teams in West Indian domestic cricket, most notably the Leeward Islands. He plays as a right-arm fast-medium bowler and right-handed lower-order batsman.

Powell made his List A debut in October 2001, playing for the Rest of Leeward Islands team in the 2001–02 Red Stripe Bowl. He made his first-class debut the following year, playing for West Indies B in the 2001–02 Busta Cup. Powell reappeared for the Rest of Leeward Islands team during the 2002–03 and 2003–04 seasons. In January 2004, he also made his debut for the full Leewards team, making 61 not out on debut against Kenya (his only first-class half-century). Powell has only appeared occasionally for the Leewards since making his debut, playing three games in the 2004–05 Regional One-Day Competition, one game in the 2009–10 Regional Four Day Competition, and one game in the 2012–13 Regional Super50. He also played for Saint Kitts in the 2006 and 2008 editions of the Stanford 20/20, making appearances against Nevis and the U.S. Virgin Islands.
