= Horace Williams (cricketer) =

Grenadian cricketer (1932–2011)

Personal information
- Born: 24 November 1932; Grenada
- Died: 16 May 2011 (aged 78)
- Source: Cricinfo, 25 November 2020

Horace Williams (24 November 1932 – 16 May 2011) was a Grenadian cricketer. He played in one List A and six first-class matches for the Windward Islands from 1960 to 1981.

== See also ==
- List of Windward Islands first-class cricketers
