= Brindley Charles =

Dominican cricketer (born 1948)

Personal information
- Born: 4 August 1948 (age 78); Dominica
- Source: Cricinfo, 25 November 2020

Brindley Charles (born 4 August 1948) is a Dominican cricketer. He played in one first-class match for the Windward Islands in 1972/73.

== See also ==
- List of Windward Islands first-class cricketers
