= Lance John =

Vincentain cricketer (born 1957)

Personal information
- Full name: Lance David John
- Born: 7 April 1957 (age 69); Barrouallie, Saint Vincent
- Batting: Left-handed
- Bowling: Right-arm medium
- Role: Opening batsman

Domestic team information
- Years: Team
- 1981–1992: Windward Islands
- 1981: Combined Islands
- Source: CricketArchive, 22 January 2015

Lance David John (born 7 April 1957) is a former Vincentian cricketer who played for the Windward Islands and the Combined Islands in West Indian domestic cricket. He played as a left-handed opening batsman.

John made his senior debut for the Windwards in January 1981, in a limited-overs game against Guyana, and his first-class debut less than a week later, against the Leeward Islands. Later in the month, he played two games for the Combined Islands in the Shell Shield, with the 1980–81 season being the last in which the Leewards and Windwards did not field separate teams. During the 1982–83 season, John scored a maiden first-class century, making 110 against Barbados at his home ground, Arnos Vale. He finished the season with 365 runs from five matches, behind only Lockhart Sebastien and Shane Julien for the Windwards. In April 1984, playing for the Windwards against the touring Australians, John scored 114 in the first innings and 88 in the second, helping his team draw the match. He made his third and final first-class century during the 1984–85 Shell Shield season (137 against Jamaica), and finished the season as the Windwards' leading run-scorer. John played his final matches for the Windwards during the 1991–92 season, aged 34, and was only the second player from Saint Vincent to play more than fifty first-class matches (after Mike Findlay).
