= Mathias Walsh =

Dominican cricketer (born 1964)

Personal information
- Born: 14 March 1964 (age 62); Dominica
- Source: Cricinfo, 25 November 2020

Mathias Walsh (born 14 March 1964) is a Dominican cricketer. He played in one List A and four first-class matches for the Windward Islands in 1991/92.

== See also ==
- List of Windward Islands first-class cricketers
