= Greg Wilson (Saint Lucian cricketer) =

Saint Lucian cricketer (born 1972)

Personal information
- Born: 22 August 1972 (age 54); Saint Lucia
- Source: Cricinfo, 25 November 2020

Greg Wilson (born 22 August 1972) is a Saint Lucian cricketer. He played in four first-class and two List A matches for the Windward Islands in 2000/01 and 2001/02.

== See also ==
- List of Windward Islands first-class cricketers
