= Hilton Nedd =

Grenadian cricketer

Personal information
- Full name: Hilton Hensley Nedd
- Born: unknown Grenada
- Role: Batsman

Domestic team information
- Years: Team
- 1970: Windward Islands
- 1970: Combined Islands
- Source: CricketArchive, 24 February 2016

Hilton Hensley Nedd (date of birth unknown) is a former Grenadian cricketer who played for the Windward Islands and Combined Islands in West Indian domestic cricket. He played as a middle-order batsman.

Nedd made his first-class debut in January 1970, playing for the Windward Islands in a friendly fixture against the Leeward Islands. Batting seventh in his team's first innings, he scored 96 not out, the highest score of the match. The following month, Nedd was selected to play a game for the Combined Islands against Barbados, as part of the 1969–70 Shell Shield season. He was not as successful as on his debut, scoring six runs in the first innings and a duck in the second. Nedd's only other first-class match came at the end of February 1970, when he represented the Windwards a touring English team (the Duke of Norfolk's XI). However, he continued to play for the Grenadian national team for several more years, at inter-island level.
