= Camilus Alexander =

Grenadian cricketer

Personal information
- Full name: Camilus Christopher Alexander
- Born: 20 October 1981 (age 45); Saint Andrew Parish, Grenada
- Batting: Right-handed
- Bowling: Right-arm leg spin

Domestic team information
- Years: Team
- 2000–2009: Windward Islands
- 2001–2002: West Indies B
- 2001: Southern Windward Islands
- Source: Cricinfo, 24 February 2016

Camilus Christopher Alexander (born 20 October 1981) is a Grenadian cricketer who has played for the Windward Islands in West Indian domestic cricket. He plays as a right-arm leg-spin bowler.

Alexander was born in Mount Horne, in Grenada's Saint Andrew Parish. Aged 17, he represented the West Indies under-19s at the 2000 World Cup, playing in three of his team's seven matches. Alexander's best performance at the tournament was 3/49 against New Zealand. He made his first-class debut a few months later, playing a single match for the West Indies under-23s against the touring Pakistanis. In the 2000–01 and 2001–02 editions of the Busta Cup, Alexander played for West Indies B, a development team. He also played a single match for the Southern Windward Islands in the 2001–02 Red Stripe Bowl, a limited-overs competition.

Between March 2002 and February 2009, Alexander played only a single match of first-class cricket, appearing for the Windward Islands against the Leeward Islands in the 2004–05 Carib Beer Cup. However, he did represent the Grenadian national team at the 2008 Stanford 20/20 tournament, playing against Anguilla and Barbados. Alexander was eventually recalled to the Windwards squad for the 2008–09 Regional Four Day Competition. In three matches, he failed to take a single wicket, although he did score 62 against Guyana (his only first-class half-century. He had come to crease as a nightwatchman at the end of the second day, following the dismissal of opener Johnson Charles.

In March 2017, he was called up to a selection camp with the potential of representing the United States at the 2017 ICC World Cricket League Division Three tournament.
