= Matthew George (cricketer) =

Dominican cricketer (born 1953)

Personal information
- Born: 19 June 1953 (age 73); Dominica
- Source: Cricinfo, 25 November 2020

Matthew George (born 19 June 1953) is a Dominican cricketer. He played in four first-class and two List A matches for the Windward Islands in 1974/75 and 1975/76.

== See also ==
- List of Windward Islands first-class cricketers
