= Clifford Lewis =

Dominican cricketer (born 1942)

Personal information
- Born: 17 November 1942 (age 83); Dominica
- Source: Cricinfo, 25 November 2020

Clifford Lewis (born 17 November 1942) is a Dominican cricketer. He played in one first-class match for the Windward Islands in 1960/61.

== See also ==
- List of Windward Islands first-class cricketers
