= Desmond Collymore =

Saint Lucian cricketer (born 1956)

Personal information
- Born: 28 June 1956 (age 70); Saint Lucia
- Source: Cricinfo, 25 November 2020

Desmond Collymore (born 28 June 1956) is a Saint Lucian cricketer. He played in 29 first-class and 12 List A matches for the Windward Islands from 1977 to 1990.

== See also ==
- List of Windward Islands first-class cricketers
