= Ralph Lowe (cricketer) =

Grenadian cricketer (born 1940)

Personal information
- Born: 8 September 1940 (age 86); Grenada
- Source: Cricinfo, 25 November 2020

Ralph Lowe (born 8 September 1940) is a Grenadian cricketer. He played in three first-class matches for the Windward Islands in 1969/70.

== See also ==
- List of Windward Islands first-class cricketers
