= Douglas Cambridge =

Vincentian cricketer

Personal information
- Born: 22 August 1941; Saint Vincent
- Died: 3 September 2005 (aged 64); Saint Vincent
- Source: Cricinfo, 26 November 2020

Douglas Cambridge (22 August 1941 – 3 September 2005) was a Vincentian cricketer. He played in two first-class matches for the Windward Islands in 1968/69.

== See also ==
- List of Windward Islands first-class cricketers
