= Kester Sylvester =

Grenadian cricketer (born 1973)

Personal information
- Born: 5 December 1973 (age 52); Grenada
- Source: Cricinfo, 25 November 2020

Kester Sylvester (born 5 December 1973) is a Grenadian cricketer. He played in 37 first-class and 12 List A matches for the Windward Islands from 1992 to 2003.

== See also ==
- List of Windward Islands first-class cricketers
