= Hubert Annibaffa =

Saint Lucian cricketer (born 1951)

Personal information
- Born: 1 November 1951 (age 75); Saint Lucia
- Source: Cricinfo, 25 November 2020

Hubert Annibaffa (born 1 November 1951) is a Saint Lucian cricketer. He played in twelve first-class and five List A matches for the Windward Islands from 1974 to 1982.

== See also ==
- List of Windward Islands first-class cricketers
