= Linton Lewis =

Vincentian cricketer, lawyer, and politician (born 1959)

- Born: 24 December 1959 (age 66); Saint Vincent
- Occupations: Lawyer, former cricketer, politician

Linton Aaron Lewis (born 1959) is a St Vincent lawyer, politician, former cricketer, and Senator. Lewis played club cricket in Wales for 9 years. He also played for the Windward Islands from 1977 to 1991. He later went into politics in his native St Vincent and the Grenadines. He served as a senator in the St Vincent's House of Assembly from 2012 to 2015.

== Biography ==
Lewis was born in Calliaqua, St Vincent on 24 December 1959.

Lewis played club cricket for Amman Valley club in Carmarthenshire, Wales from 1981 to 1990 setting numerous league records. He also played in 32 first-class and 18 List A matches for the Windward Islands from 1977 to 1991. In 1984, he scored a half-century in a match between the Windward Islands and Australia.

Lewis studied accounting at the Gwent College of Higher Education. From 1993 to 1995, he studied law at the University of Bristol. There, he played for the Old Bristolians. In one match, he scored a double century. Lewis was called to the Bar of England and Wales in 1996 at Gray's Inn. He went on to set up in private practice in Kingstown, St Vincent.

In 2013, he was chairman of the New Democratic Party. He served in that role until 2016.

From 2012 to 2015, he was a senator, an appointed member of his country's unicameral House of Assembly.

== See also ==
- List of Windward Islands first-class cricketers
