= Cecil Elwin =

Dominican cricketer (born 1955)

Personal information
- Born: 16 July 1955 (age 71); Dominica
- Source: Cricinfo, 25 November 2020

Cecil Elwin (born 16 July 1955) is a Dominican cricketer. He played in five first-class and six List A matches for the Windward Islands from 1977 to 1984.

== See also ==
- List of Windward Islands first-class cricketers
