= Jerome Pierre =

Dominican cricketer (born 1939)

Personal information
- Born: 28 September 1939 (age 87); Dominica
- Source: Cricinfo, 25 November 2020

Jerome Pierre (born 28 September 1939) is a Dominican cricketer. He played in three first-class matches for the Windward Islands in 1965/66.

== See also ==
- List of Windward Islands first-class cricketers
