= Salvan Browne =

Vincentian cricketer (born 1982)

Personal information
- Born: 19 March 1982 (age 44); Saint Vincent
- Source: Cricinfo, 26 November 2020

Salvan Browne (born 19 March 1982) is a Vincentian cricketer. He played in two first-class matches for the Windward Islands in 2008 and 2009.

== See also ==
- List of Windward Islands first-class cricketers
