= Darren Williams (cricketer) =

Dominican cricketer (born 1964)

Personal information
- Born: 8 September 1964 (age 62); Dominica
- Source: Cricinfo, 25 November 2020

Darren Williams (born 8 September 1964) is a Dominican cricketer. He played in two first-class matches for the Windward Islands in 1987/88.

== See also ==
- List of Windward Islands first-class cricketers
