= Martial Francis =

Saint Lucian cricketer (born 1953)

Personal information
- Born: 10 January 1953 (age 73); Saint Lucia
- Source: Cricinfo, 25 November 2020

Martial Francis (born 10 January 1953) is a Saint Lucian cricketer. He played in sixteen first-class matches for the Windward Islands from 1969 to 1973.

== See also ==
- List of Windward Islands first-class cricketers
