= Gosnel Cupid =

Vincentian cricketer (born 1963)

Personal information
- Born: 9 July 1963 (age 63); Saint Vincent
- Source: Cricinfo, 26 November 2020

Gosnel Cupid (born 9 July 1963) is a Vincentian cricketer. He played in seven first-class and three List A matches for the Windward Islands in 1993/94 and 1994/95.

== See also ==
- List of Windward Islands first-class cricketers
