= Harold Williams (cricketer) =

Grenadian cricketer (born 1959)

Personal information
- Born: 2 September 1959 (age 67); Grenada
- Source: Cricinfo, 25 November 2020

Harold Williams (born 2 September 1959) is a Grenadian cricketer. He played in one first-class match for the Windward Islands in 1980/81.

== See also ==
- List of Windward Islands first-class cricketers
