= John Prince (cricketer) =

Saint Lucian cricketer (born 1969)

Personal information
- Born: 7 January 1969 (age 57); Saint Lucia
- Source: Cricinfo, 25 November 2020

John Prince (born 7 January 1969) is a Saint Lucian cricketer. He played in three first-class and three List A matches for the Windward Islands in 1992/93.

== See also ==
- List of Windward Islands first-class cricketers
