= Sergio Fedee =

Saint Lucian cricketer

Personal information
- Full name: Sergio Mendes Fedee
- Born: 13 January 1983 (age 43); Unity Village, Guyana
- Batting: Left-handed
- Bowling: Right-arm medium
- Role: All-rounder

Domestic team information
- Years: Team
- 2002: Northern Windward Islands
- 2004–2012: Windward Islands
- Source: CricketArchive, 29 March 2016

Sergio Mendes Fedee (born 13 January 1983) is a Saint Lucian cricketer who has played for the Windward Islands in West Indian domestic cricket. He plays as a left-handed middle-order batsman.

Fedee was born in Unity Village, Guyana, to a Saint Lucian father and a Saint Lucian mother, and moved to Saint Lucia as a child. He was named after the Brazilian musician Sérgio Mendes. Fedee made his senior debut in West Indian domestic cricket at the 2001–02 Red Stripe Bowl, representing the Northern Windward Islands team that was competing on a once-off basis. His first-class debut came in February 2004, when he played for the full Windwards team in a Carib Beer Cup game against West Indies B. In 2006 and 2008, Fedee represented the Saint Lucian national team in the Stanford 20/20 tournament. He had little success, however, with his highest score being 17 runs from 28 balls against the Cayman Islands. Fedee's most recent match for the Windwards came in the 2011–12 Regional Four Day Competition, against Barbados.

Since the end of his professional sporting career he has moved to London, United Kingdom and set up several companies specialising in Caribbean tourism.
