= Heron Campbell =

Grenadian cricketer (born 1987)

Personal information
- Full name: Heron Daniele Campbell
- Born: 23 December 1987 (age 38); Saint Andrew Parish, Grenada
- Batting: Right-handed
- Bowling: Right-arm off spin

Domestic team information
- Years: Team
- 2007–2008: Windward Islands
- Source: CricketArchive, 18 January 2016

Heron Daniele Campbell (born 23 December 1987) is a Grenadian cricketer who has played for the Windward Islands in West Indian domestic cricket. He is a right-handed opening batsman.

Campbell played for Grenada at the 2006 and 2008 editions of the Stanford 20/20, making his debut at the age of 18. He made his first-class debut for the Windwards in the 2006–07 Carib Beer Cup, against Guyana. Campbell's highest score for the Windwards came against the Leeward Islands in the 2007–08 Carib Beer Cup, an innings of 48 runs opening the batting with Miles Bascombe. He has not played for the Windwards since the 2007–08 season, and was aged 21 at the time of his most recent appearance.

When the Bangladeshi cricket team was in the West Indies in 2014, he scored 23 runs opening the batting for the Grenada team that played in a tour match against the visitors.
