= Bertram Stapleton =

Vincentian cricketer (born 1970)

Personal information
- Born: 19 October 1970 (age 56); Saint Vincent
- Source: Cricinfo, 26 November 2020

Bertram Stapleton (born 19 October 1970) is a Vincentian cricketer. He played in three first-class and seven List A matches for the Windward Islands from 1994 to 2003.

== See also ==
- List of Windward Islands first-class cricketers
