= Bront DeFreitas =

West Indian cricketer

Personal information
- Full name: Bront Arson DeFreitas
- Born: 12 November 1978 (age 48); Saint Vincent
- Batting: Right-handed
- Bowling: Right-arm fast-medium

Domestic team information
- Years: Team
- 2002: Rest of Leeward Islands
- 2008–2010: Leeward Islands
- Source: CricketArchive, 28 December 2015

Bront Arson DeFreitas (born 12 November 1978) is a British Virgin Islands cricketer who has played for the Leeward Islands in West Indian domestic cricket.

DeFreitas was born on Saint Vincent, one of the Windward Islands, but has played all his cricket in the Leewards. His first appearances at a regional level came during the 2002–03 Red Stripe Bowl, a limited-overs tournament. He represented the Rest of Leeward Islands team, which was organised during the early 2000s in seasons when Antigua and Barbuda played as a separate team. In 2006 and 2008, DeFreitas appeared for the British Virgin Islands national team in the Stanford 20/20 tournament, where matches held full Twenty20 status. In between, he had made his first-class debut for the Leeward Islands, playing against Trinidad and Tobago in the 2007–08 Carib Beer Cup. The following season, also against Trinidad and Tobago, DeFreitas took his maiden first-class five-wicket haul, 5/88 in a losing cause. His final match for the Leewards came in the 2009–10 Regional Four Day Competition, against the Combined Campuses and Colleges.
