= Steve Mahon (cricketer) =

Grenadian cricketer (born 1965)

Personal information
- Full name: Steve Leslie Mahon
- Born: 22 January 1965 (age 61); Union, Grenada
- Batting: Right-handed
- Bowling: Right-arm off-spin

Domestic team information
- Years: Team
- 1985/86–1992/93: Windward Islands

Career statistics
| Competition | First-class | List A |
|---|---|---|
| Matches | 17 | 9 |
| Runs scored | 440 | 133 |
| Batting average | 14.66 | 22.16 |
| 100s/50s | 0/0 | 0/0 |
| Top score | 45 | 38 |
| Catches/stumpings | 7/– | 1/– |
- Source: CricketArchive, 4 June 2026

Steve Leslie Mahon (born 22 January 1965) is a former Grenadian cricketer who represented the Windward Islands in West Indian domestic cricket. He played as a right-handed middle-order batsman.

Mahon made his first-class debut for the Windwards in January 1986, in a Shell Shield game against Barbados. He made semi-regular appearances for the team into the following decade, in both first-class and one-day competitions, but never established himself in the side for an extended period. In total, Mahon played seventeen first-class and nine List A matches for the Windwards between 1986 and 1993. He never passed fifty in either format, with his highest first-class score being 45 (made against Yorkshire in March 1987) and his highest one-day score being 38 (made against Jamaica in February 1988).
