= McNeil Morgan =

Vincentian cricketer (born 1970)

Personal information
- Born: 18 October 1970 (age 56); Saint Vincent
- Source: Cricinfo, 26 November 2020

McNeil Morgan (born 18 October 1970) is a Vincentian cricketer. He played in 29 first-class and 14 List A matches for the Windward Islands from 1994 to 2002.

== See also ==
- List of Windward Islands first-class cricketers
