= Lesroy Irish =

West Indian cricketer

Personal information
- Full name: Lesroy James Irish
- Born: 29 February 1972 (age 54); Montserrat
- Batting: Left-handed
- Bowling: Right-arm fast-medium

Domestic team information
- Years: Team
- 2007: Herefordshire
- 2001/02: Rest of Leeward Islands
- 1996/97–1997/98: Leeward Islands

Career statistics
Competition	First-class	List A
Matches	5	2
Runs scored	3	–
Batting average	0.75	–
100s/50s	–/–	–/–
Top score	2	–
Balls bowled	786	115
Wickets	13	4
Bowling average	26.76	15.25
5 wickets in innings	–	–
10 wickets in match	–	–
Best bowling	2/14	2/22
Catches/stumpings	5/–	–/–
- Source: Cricinfo, 22 August 2011

Lesroy James Irish (born 29 February 1972) is a former Montserratian cricketer. Irish was a left-handed batsman who bowled right-arm fast-medium.

Irish made his first-class debut for the Leeward Islands against the Windward Islands in the 1996/97 Red Stripe Cup. He made four further first-class appearances for the Leeward Islands, the last of which came against the Windward Islands in the 1997/98 West Indies Board President's Cup. In his five first-class matches, he took 13 wickets at an average of 26.76, with best figures of 2/14. Irish later appeared in List A cricket, playing two matches in that format for a Rest of Leeward Islands team in the 2001/02 Red Stripe Bowl, against Jamaica and Northern Windward Islands. He took 4 wickets in his two List A matches, which came at an average of 15.25, with best figures of 2/22.

He later played in England for Herefordshire in the 2007 Minor Counties Championship, making an appearance each against Wales Minor Counties and Wiltshire.
