= Irvin Warrican =

Vincentian cricketer (1965–2022)

Personal information
- Born: 27 November 1965; Saint Vincent and the Grenadines
- Died: 21 August 2022 (aged 56)

Irvin Warrican (27 November 1965 – 21 August 2022) was a Vincentian cricketer. He played in six first-class and four List A matches for the Windward Islands from 1990 to 1996. Warrican died on 21 August 2022, at the age of 56.

== See also ==
- List of Windward Islands first-class cricketers
