= Stanley Hinds =

Vincentian cricketer (born 1951)

Personal information
- Born: 21 March 1951 (age 75); Saint Vincent
- Source: Cricinfo, 26 November 2020

Stanley Hinds (born 21 March 1951) is a Vincentian cricketer. He played in 36 first-class and 10 List A matches for the Windward Islands from 1974 to 1986.

== See also ==
- List of Windward Islands first-class cricketers
