= Colville Browne =

Vincentian cricketer (born 1953)

Personal information
- Born: 14 May 1953 (age 73); Kingstown, Saint Vincent
- Batting: Right-handed
- Bowling: Right-arm medium

Domestic team information
- Years: Team
- 1972–1981: Windward Islands
- 1978: Combined Islands
- Source: CricketArchive, 7 March 2016

Colville Browne (born 14 May 1953) is a former Vincentian cricketer who represented the Windward Islands and Combined Islands in West Indian domestic cricket. He played as a right-handed middle-order batsman.

Browne made his first-class debut for the Windwards in January 1972, aged 18, playing a friendly match against the Leeward Islands. He remained a regular in Windward Islands teams for almost a decade, playing his last match for the team in March 1981 (a limited-overs match against Barbados). During the 1977–78 season, Browne was called up to the Combined Islands for two Shell Shield matches. In the second of those, against Guyana, he scored 51 runs, his maiden first-class fifty. His only other half-century came in March 1979, when he made 60 runs out of a team total of 496 against the Leeward Islands. Despite playing exclusively as a batsman, Browne finished with a first-class batting average of only 16.64 (from 15 matches), and a List A average of 11.80 (from 12 matches).
