= Leroy Lewis (cricketer) =

Dominican cricketer (born 1963)

Personal information
- Born: 22 September 1963 (age 63); Dominica
- Source: Cricinfo, 25 November 2020

Leroy Lewis (born 22 September 1963) is a Dominican cricketer. He played in one first-class match for the Windward Islands in 1991/92.

== See also ==
- List of Windward Islands first-class cricketers
