= Frederick Thorpe (cricketer) =

Saint Lucian cricketer (1954–2026)

Personal information
- Full name: Frederick Aloysius Thorpe
- Born: 5 March 1954; Saint Lucia
- Died: 2026
- Batting: Right-handed
- Bowling: Right-arm medium

Domestic team information
- Years: Team
- 1976/77–1982/83: Windward Islands
- Source: Cricinfo, 25 November 2020

Frederick Aloysius Thorpe (5 March 1954 – 2026) was a Saint Lucian cricketer. He played in nine first-class and seven List A matches for the Windward Islands from 1976 to 1983.

== See also ==
- List of Windward Islands first-class cricketers
