= Jason Williams (cricketer) =

West Indian cricketer (born 1976)

Personal information
- Full name: Jason Lester Williams
- Born: 5 September 1976 (age 50); Saint Kitts
- Batting: Right-handed
- Role: Wicket-keeper

Domestic team information
- Years: Team
- 1999–2007: Leeward Islands
- 2001–2003: Rest of Leeward Islands
- Source: CricketArchive, 1 January 2016

Jason Lester Williams (born 5 September 1976) is a former Kittitian cricketer who played for the Leeward Islands in West Indian domestic cricket. He was a wicket-keeper who batted right-handed.

Williams made his first-class debut for the Leeward Islands in January 1999, playing against Jamaica in the 1998–99 Busta Cup. He continued to make irregular appearances for the team into the mid-2000s, with his last matches for the team coming in the 2006–07 KFC Cup. Beginning with the 2001–02 Red Stripe Bowl, Williams played three seasons as the wicket-keeper for the Rest of Leeward Islands side that competed during Antigua and Barbuda's period as a separate team. His highest score for the Leewards was 42, made against the Windward Islands in the 2003–04 Carib Beer Cup. In 2006, Williams also played a match for Saint Kitts in the Stanford 20/20, against Nevis.
