= Marvin Noel =

Grenadian cricketer (born 1986)

Personal information
- Full name: Marvin Kimono Noel
- Born: 6 January 1986 (age 40); Grenada
- Batting: Right-handed
- Bowling: Right-arm medium
- Role: Wicket-keeper

Domestic team information
- Years: Team
- 2005: Windward Islands
- Source: CricketArchive, 24 February 2016

Marvin Kimono Noel (born 6 January 1986) is a Grenadian cricketer who has played for the Windward Islands in West Indian domestic cricket. He is a right-handed top-order batsman.

Noel made his first-class debut for the Windwards at the age of 19, playing a Carib Beer Cup match against Jamaica in January 2005. He was retained for the team's next fixture, against Guyana, but was then dropped. In both his matches for the Windwards, he played as an opening batsman, partnering with Devon Smith. In junior competitions, however, Noel generally played as a wicket-keeper. In 2003, he had been one of five young wicket-keepers selected by the West Indies Cricket Board to take part in an intensive training camp in Antigua.
