= Kirsten Casimir =

Dominican cricketer (born 1978)

Personal information
- Full name: Kirsten Nicole Casimir
- Born: 28 May 1978 (age 48); Dominica
- Batting: Right-handed
- Bowling: Right-arm slow

Domestic team information
- Years: Team
- 2001–2003: Windward Islands
- 2001: Northern Windward Islands
- 2002: Rest of Windward Islands
- Source: CricketArchive, 23 January 2016

Kirsten Nicole Casimir (born 28 May 1978) is a former Dominican cricketer who played for the Windward Islands in West Indian domestic cricket. He played as a right-handed middle-order batsman.

Casimir made his first-class debut in January 2001, playing for the Windwards in the 2000–01 Busta Cup. He scored 63 on debut against the Leeward Islands, what was to be his highest first-class score. Playing for the Northern Windward Islands team in the 2001–02 Red Stripe Bowl, Casimir scored 83 against Trinidad and Tobago, from fourth in the batting order. The following season, he played for the Rest of the Windward Islands team. Casimir's final matches for the Windwards came during the 2003–04 Red Stripe Bowl. In 2006 and 2008, he represented Dominica at the Stanford 20/20 tournament, with a highest score of 30 against the British Virgin Islands.
