= Peter Thomas (Grenadian cricketer) =

Grenadian cricketer (born 1954)

Personal information
- Born: 1954 (age 71–72); Grenada
- Batting: Right-handed
- Bowling: Right-arm medium

Domestic team information
- Years: Team
- 1973–1979: Windward Islands
- Source: CricketArchive, 18 January 2016

Peter Thomas (born 1954) is a former Grenadian cricketer who represented the Windward Islands in West Indian domestic cricket. He played as a right-arm medium-pace bowler.

Thomas made his first-class debut for the Windwards in July 1973, in a friendly against the Leeward Islands. After that, he did not return to the line-up until the 1976–77 season, when he made three first-class appearances (two against the Leeward Islands and one against the touring Pakistanis). He also played two limited-overs matches in the 1976–77 Gillette Cup. During the 1977–78 season, Thomas took 4/47, a career-best in first-class cricket, in an inter-island game against the Leewards. He also played in a four-day game against the touring Australians, taking the wickets of Alan Ogilvie and Kim Hughes. Thomas's final matches in top-level West Indian cricket came during the 1978–79 season. In what was to be his final appearance for the Windward Islands, he took 4/35 from nine overs in a one-day game against Trinidad and Tobago, although his performance was not enough to prevent his team's defeat.
