= Raymond Casimir =

Dominican cricketer (born 1976)

Personal information
- Born: 28 October 1976 (age 50); Dominica
- Batting: Left-handed
- Bowling: Left-arm orthodox

Domestic team information
- Years: Team
- 2002: Rest of Windward Islands
- 2008–2009: Windward Islands
- Source: CricketArchive, 23 January 2016

Raymond Casimir (born 28 October 1976) is a former Dominican cricketer who played for the Windward Islands in West Indian domestic cricket. He played as a left-arm orthodox bowler who batted left-handed.

Casimir appeared for the Rest of Windward Islands team in the 2002–03 Red Stripe Bowl, where Saint Vincent and the Grenadines were competing as a separate team. His first-class debut for the Windwards came almost six years later, against Jamaica in the 2007–08 Carib Beer Cup. Casimir's second and final match for the Windwards came the following season, against Trinidad and Tobago. He also represented Dominica in the 2008 edition of the Stanford 20/20, playing against the British Virgin Islands and Barbados.
