= Evelyn Gresham =

Grenadian cricketer

Personal information
- Full name: John Evelyn Foster Gresham
- Born: 1933 or 1934; Grenada
- Died: 18 June 2012 (aged 78); Grenada
- Batting: Right-handed
- Bowling: Left-arm orthodox

Domestic team information
- Years: Team
- 1954–1968: Windward Islands
- 1955–1966: Combined Islands

Umpiring information
- FC umpired: 1 (1972)
- Source: CricketArchive, 24 February 2016

John Evelyn Foster Gresham (1933/34 – 18 June 2012) was a Grenadian cricketer who played for the Windward Islands and Combined Islands in West Indian domestic cricket. He played as a left-arm orthodox bowler.

Gresham made his senior debut for the Windward Islands in March 1954, against the touring English team. He also appeared against the touring Australians the following season, although the team's matches at that time did not have first-class status. In December 1959, Gresham was selected to play for the Windwards in the team's inaugural first-class match, against England. He took 4/13 on debut, which was to be a career-best. Two seasons later, in October 1961, Gresham also participated in the inaugural first-class fixture for the Combined Islands, captaining the team against British Guiana. He was a regular for both teams over the remainder of the decade, although he took more than two wickets in an innings on only two occasions after his debut.

During the 1966–67 season, Gresham was appointed captain of the Windward Islands, serving in that role for three games (two of which were Shell Shield fixtures). He made his final first-class appearance in March 1968.

A few seasons later, in April 1972, Gresham was chosen to umpire two of the Windwards' matches against the touring New Zealanders (a first-class fixture followed by a limited-overs match). Those were his only matches as an umpire at a high level.

Outside of cricket, Gresham founded an insurance company, and was also a keen tennis and golf player. He died in June 2012, aged 78.
