= Henry Elwin =

Dominican cricketer (born 1943)

Personal information
- Born: 29 April 1943 (age 83); Dominica
- Source: Cricinfo, 25 November 2020

Henry Elwin (born 29 April 1943) is a Dominican cricketer. He played in eight first-class matches for the Windward Islands from 1964 to 1967.

== See also ==
- List of Windward Islands first-class cricketers
