= Uzzah Pope =

Vincentian cricketer (born 1971)

Personal information
- Born: 3 January 1971 (age 55); Saint Vincent
- Source: Cricinfo, 26 November 2020

Uzzah Pope (born 3 January 1971) is a Vincentian cricketer.

A left-handed batsman and wicket keeper, Pope played in 33 first-class and 25 List A matches for the Windward Islands from 1991 to 2003.

== See also ==
- List of Windward Islands first-class cricketers
