= Sydney Murphy =

Vincentian cricketer (born 1960)

Personal information
- Full name: Sydney Albert Edward Murphy
- Born: 28 March 1960 (age 66); Lowman's Hill, Saint Vincent
- Batting: Right-handed
- Bowling: Right-arm fast-medium

Domestic team information
- Years: Team
- 1985: Cornwall
- 1983/84–1986/87: Windward Islands

Career statistics
Competition	First-class	List A
Matches	7	3
Runs scored	29	–
Batting average	4.14	–
100s/50s	–/–	–/–
Top score	7*	–
Balls bowled	1,146	145
Wickets	12	0
Bowling average	58.66	–
5 wickets in innings	–	–
10 wickets in match	–	–
Best bowling	2/46	–
Catches/stumpings	4/–	–/–
- Source: Cricinfo, 1 January 2017

Sydney Albert Edward Murphy (born 28 March 1960) is a former Vincentian cricketer. Murphy was a right-handed batsman who bowled right-arm fast-medium.

Born in the farming community of Lowman's Hill on the island of Saint Vincent, Murphy made his debut for the Windward Islands in a 1983/84 Shell Shield first-class match against Trinidad and Tobago. Subsequent to this, he had played for Saint Vincent and the Grenadines in minor regional matches since 1981. He travelled to England in 1985, where he played a one-day minor counties match for Cornwall in the MCCA Knockout Trophy. He continued to play for the Windward Islands until the 1986/87 West Indian season, making a total of seven first-class and three List A appearances, without notable success.
