= Julian Charles (cricketer) =

Saint Lucian cricketer

Personal information
- Full name: Julian Desmond Charles
- Born: 3 May 1961 (age 65); Laborie, Saint Lucia
- Nickname: Charlo
- Batting: Right-handed
- Bowling: Right-arm leg spin

Domestic team information
- Years: Team
- 1983–1992: Windward Islands
- Source: CricketArchive, 28 December 2015

Julian Desmond Charles (born 3 May 1961) is a former Saint Lucian cricketer who played for the Windward Islands in West Indian domestic cricket. He was the first Saint Lucian to score a first-class hundred.

A right-handed middle-order batsman and occasional leg spin bowler, Charles made his first-class debut for the Windwards during the 1982–83 Shell Shield season. He scored his maiden first-class century during the 1985–86 season (114 against Guyana), having earlier spent the 1985 English season playing for Cornwall in the Minor Counties Championship. At the beginning of the 1986–87 season, Charles was selected to tour Zimbabwe with a "West Indies B" team, playing both first-class and limited-overs fixtures. In a three-day match against the Zimbabwe Cricket Union President's XI, he made what was to be his highest first-class score, 185 runs from third in the batting order. Charles continued playing for the Windwards up until the 1991–92 season, but passed fifty only three times in his last five seasons.

Since the conclusion of his playing career, he has filled several administrative roles, including serving as both a director and chairman of selectors of the Windward Islands Cricket Board of Control, and as a director of the West Indies Cricket Board. He was elected President of the Saint Lucia National Cricket Association in 2009, and was re-elected in 2011, 2013, and 2015.

In February 2020, he was named in the West Indies' squad for the Over-50s Cricket World Cup in South Africa. However, the tournament was cancelled during the third round of matches due to the coronavirus pandemic.
