= Fernix Thomas =

Dominican cricketer (born 1980)

Personal information
- Born: 26 September 1980 (age 46); Dominica
- Source: Cricinfo, 25 November 2020

Fernix Thomas (born 26 September 1980) is a Dominican cricketer. He played in twenty-six first-class and fourteen List A matches for the Windward Islands from 1999 to 2005.

== See also ==
- List of Windward Islands first-class cricketers
