= Alpart Sports Club Ground =

Cricket ground in Nain, Jamaica

- Interactive map of Alpart Sports Club Ground

Ground information
- Location: Nain, Jamaica
- Country: Jamaica
- Coordinates: 17.9843°N 77.5899°W
- Establishment: 1960s

Team information
Jamaica	(1980/81–2010/11)
- As of 27 April 2022; Source: Ground profile

Alpart Sports Club Ground is a cricket ground in Nain, Jamaica.

== History ==
With the introduction of the bauxite mining industry to Jamaica in the late 1950s and mid 1960s, a number of sports and social club's were constructed for their employees. The Alpart Sports Club was one such sports and social club, formed for the workers of the nearby Alpart owned refinery. The ground first played host to major cricket when it hosted a List A one-day match in the 1980–81 Geddes Grant/Harrison Line Trophy between Jamaica and Trinidad and Tobago. From 1997, the ground was a regular venue for matches in the Red Stripe Bowl, with 13 one-day matches played there to 2007. Between 1999 and 2011, the ground also played host to 14 home first-class matches for Jamaica in the Regional Four Day Competition.

== Records ==
=== First-class ===
- Highest team total: 455 all out by Jamaica v Windward Islands, 2004–05
- Lowest team total: 55 all out by Windward Islands v Jamaica, 1998–99
- Highest individual innings: 250 not out by Marlon Samuels for Jamaica v Guyana, 2010–11
- Best bowling in an innings: 5–22 by Franklyn Rose for Jamaica v Trinidad and Tobago, 1999–00
- Best bowling in a match: 9–38 by Dwight Washington for Jamaica v Windward Islands, 2004–05

=== List A ===
- Highest team total: 267 for 5 (50 overs) by Jamaica v Northern Windward Islands, 2001–02
- Lowest team total: 76 all out (35 overs) by Windward Islands v Guyana, 1999–00
- Highest individual innings: 119 by Chris Gayle for Jamaica v Northern Windward Islands, 2001–02
- Best bowling in an innings: 6–19 by Laurie Williams for Jamaica v Bermuda, 1997–98

== See also ==
- List of cricket grounds in the West Indies
