= Shane Julien =

Grenadian cricketer

Personal information
- Full name: Shane Willan Julien
- Born: 6 January 1956; Saint George Parish, Grenada
- Died: 25 January 1992 (aged 36); Christ Church Parish, Barbados
- Batting: Right-handed
- Bowling: Right-arm medium

Domestic team information
- Years: Team
- 1981: Barbados
- 1982–1987: Windward Islands
- 1984: Leeward Islands
- Source: CricketArchive, 17 January 2016

Shane Willan Julien (6 January 1956 – 25 January 1992) was a Grenadian cricketer whose career in top-level West Indian domestic cricket spanned from 1981 to 1987. His primary team was the Windward Islands, but he also played a single season each for Barbados and the Leeward Islands.

== Early life ==
Julien was born on 6 January 1956, in Point Salines, Saint George Parish, Grenada. The son of a prominent businessman, he was sent to school overseas, attending The Lodge School in Barbados and England's Trent College.

== Cricket career ==
During the 1977 English season, Julien played for Middlesex in the Second XI Championship. He subsequently moved to Barbados, appearing for the Wanderers Cricket Club. In April 1981, Julien was selected for Barbados in the final of the 1980–81 Geddes Grant/Harrison Line Trophy, making his List A debut. That game was his only appearance for Barbados, and he returned to Grenada shortly after, making his first-class debut for the Windward Islands in March 1982.

A right-handed middle-order batsman, Julien scored his maiden first-class century during the 1982–83 Shell Shield season, an innings of 123 against Trinidad and Tobago. His score came in the fourth innings of the match, and helped his team chase down a target of 367. At the beginning of the 1983–84 season, Julien was selected in a "Young West Indies" squad to tour Zimbabwe, playing both first-class and one-day fixtures. In the fourth and final one-day fixture, he scored what was to be his only List-A century, making 142 runs from fourth in the batting order (and putting on 213 runs for the third wicket with Timur Mohamed). Julien subsequently spent the 1983–84 domestic season with the Leeward Islands, moving to Saint Kitts. He consequently became one of the few men to play for both the Windwards and the Leewards. (Note: Others include Roy Marshall, Richie Richardson, and Adam Sanford.)

Julien returned to the Windward Islands for the 1984–85 season, and remained with them for the rest of his career. He played his final matches during the 1986–87 Shell Shield season, finishing with a first-class batting average of 31.48. After finishing his cricket career, Julien concentrated on his fishing business, spending time in both Grenada and Barbados. He died in Barbados on 25 January 1992, having committed suicide by hanging.
