= Junie Mitchum =

West Indian cricketer (born 1973)

Junie Alexander Mitchum (born 22 November 1973 in Saint Kitts) is a West Indian cricketer who has played first-class and List A cricket for the Leeward Islands.
