= Earl Waldron =

West Indian cricketer (born 1966)

Earl Waldron (born 31 August 1966 in Antigua) is a West Indian cricket player. He has played three first-class matches for the Leeward Islands. He also played four List A matches for the Leewards, and nine for Antigua & Barbuda, including one match in the 1998 Commonwealth Games cricket tournament.
