= Richard Smith (Trinidadian cricketer) =

Trinidadian cricketer (born 1971)

Personal information
- Born: 17 July 1971 (age 55); Trinidad
- Source: Cricinfo, 28 November 2020

Richard Smith (born 17 July 1971) is a Trinidadian cricketer. He played in 70 first-class and 46 List A matches for Trinidad and Tobago from 1990 to 2003.

== See also ==
- List of Trinidadian representative cricketers
