= John Sylvester (cricketer) =

Grenadian cricketer (born 1969)

Personal information
- Born: 6 October 1969 (age 57); Grenada
- Source: Cricinfo, 25 November 2020

John Sylvester (born 6 October 1969) is a Grenadian cricketer. He played in twenty first-class and twenty List A matches for the Windward Islands from 1992 to 2003.

== See also ==
- List of Windward Islands first-class cricketers
