= Nain, Jamaica =

Settlement in Jamaica

Coordinates: 17.965°N 77.599°W

Location of Nain in Jamaica

Nain is a settlement in Jamaica. It has a population of 2,331 as of 2009. The Alpart Sports Club Ground, which has played host to first-class cricket matches for Jamaica is located in the village.
