= Leon Garrick =

Jamaican cricketer (born 1976)

Personal information
- Full name: Leon Vivian Garrick
- Born: 11 November 1976 (age 50); Saint Ann, Jamaica
- Batting: Right-handed
- Bowling: Right-arm medium pace

International information
- National side: West Indies
- Only Test: 19 April 2001 v South Africa
- ODI debut: 28 April 2001 v South Africa
- Last ODI: 19 August 2001 v Kenya

Domestic team information
- Years: Team
- 1996–2003: Jamaica

Career statistics
Competition	Tests	ODIs	FC	LA
Matches	1	3	57	30
Runs scored	27	99	3,121	663
Batting average	13.50	33.00	32.17	25.50
100s/50s	0/0	0/1	6/14	0/4
Top score	27	76	200*	76
Balls bowled	0	0	14	4
Wickets	–	–	1	0
Bowling average	–	–	4.00	–
5 wickets in innings	–	–	0	0
10 wickets in match	–	–	0	0
Best bowling	–	–	1/4	0/6
Catches/stumpings	2/–	0/–	59/–	7/–
- Source: Cricket Archive, 31 October 2010

Leon Vivian Garrick (born 11 November 1976) is a West Indian cricketer who played one Test and three One Day Internationals in 2001.

Garrick was born in Saint Ann, Jamaica, and played for the Jamaican youth side before making his first-class debut in 1997, where he made successive centuries. Garrick learned his craft under the guidance of Derrick Azan at the Garvey Maceo High School in Jamaica, an institution renowned for its excellence in School boy cricket in Jamaica, having produced Laurie Williams, Keith Hibbert and Audley Sanson.

Garrick has played for Middlesex and Kaiser Sports Club in the Jamaica County Competition. A good batsman who was comfortable playing any type of bowling, Garrick also kept wicket at times throughout his career.

Garrick has the record for the largest opening partnership for Jamaica; an unbeaten 425 with Chris Gayle.
