= Kurt Wilkinson =

West Indian cricketer (born 1981)

Kurt Jason Wilkinson (born 14 August 1981) in Applewaites St. George, Barbados. He is a West Indies cricketer who plays for Barbados in the KFC Cup. He was dismissed by the unusual method of being adjudged out hit the ball twice in a Red Stripe Bowl match in 2002-03.He has also represented Barbados at u/15, u/19 and first class levels. He represented West Indies u/19 at the Youth World Cup in Sri Lanka in 99/000. He attended the first shell cricket academy in Grenada. He was selected to the West Indies odi tour to South Africa in 2004/2005 but didn't get a game and was never selected after that. He has played league cricket in England and is currently a cricket west Indies accredited level 2 cricket coach.
