= Curtis Roberts =

West Indian cricketer (born 1975)

Curtis Dale Roberts (born 13 February 1975 in Liberta, Antigua) is a West Indian cricketer who played List A cricket for the Leeward Islands.
