= Reynold McLean =

Vincentian cricketer (born 1975)

Personal information
- Born: 9 April 1975 (age 51); Saint Vincent and the Grenadines
- Source: Cricinfo, 26 November 2020

Reynold McLean (born 9 April 1975) is a Vincentian cricketer. He played in ten first-class and nine List A matches for the Windward Islands from 1998 to 2003.

== See also ==
- List of Windward Islands first-class cricketers
