= Ronald Etienne =

Grenadian cricketer (born 1986)

Ronald Richard Etienne (born 18 November 1986 in Grenada) is a West Indian cricketer who has played first-class and List A cricket for the Windward Islands.
