= Denis Byam =

Vincentian cricketer (born 1977)

Personal information
- Full name: Denis Fitz-Allan Alister Byam
- Born: 29 January 1977 (age 49); Saint Vincent
- Batting: Right-handed

Career statistics
| Competition | FC | LA |
|---|---|---|
| Matches | 3 | 6 |
| Runs scored | 52 | 38 |
| Batting average | 8.66 | 7.60 |
| 100s/50s | 0/0 | 0/0 |
| Top score | 17 | 10 |
| Catches/stumpings | 2/– | 2/– |
- Source: Cricinfo, 26 November 2020

Denis Byam (born 29 January 1977) is a Vincentian physiotherapist and former first-class cricketer. He has worked as the physiotherapist for the West Indies cricket team since 2019.

== Career ==
Byam played in three first-class and six List A matches for the Windward Islands from 1996 to 2003. Byam pursued a BSc and MSc in physical therapy in Cuba, before returning home in 2010 to set up practice at Arnos Vale. He worked as a physiotherapist for Windward Islands, prior to his selection as the physiotherapist for the West Indies cricket team in July 2019. He completed a Doctor of Science in physical rehabilitation in Havana in December 2021.

== See also ==
- List of Windward Islands first-class cricketers
