= Shane Jeffers =

West Indian cricketer (born 1981)

Shane Melvon Jeffers, born 12 September 1981 at Sandy Point, St Kitts, is a West Indian cricketer who played first-class and List A cricket for the Leeward Islands.
