= Vishal Nagamootoo =

Guyanese cricketer

Personal information
- Born: 7 January 1978; Whim, Guyana
- Batting: Left-handed
- Role: Wicket-keeper
- Relatives: Mahendra Nagamootoo (brother); Alvin Kallicharran (uncle); Rohan Kanhai (uncle)

Domestic team information
- Years: Team
- 1996–2005: Guyana
- Source: CricketArchive, 19 November 2016

Vishal Nagamootoo (விஷால் நாகமுத்து) (born 7 January 1977) is a Tamil-Guyanese former cricketer who represented the Guyanese national team in West Indian domestic cricket. He played as a wicket-keeper.

Of Tamil Indo-Guyanese origin, Nagamootoo was born in the village of Whim, in Guyana's East Berbice-Corentyne region. His older brother, Mahendra Nagamootoo, and two uncles, Alvin Kallicharran and Rohan Kanhai, all played international cricket for the West Indies. Nagamootoo made his first-class debut for Guyana in February 1996, against Barbados. Earlier in the season, he had toured Pakistan with the West Indies under-19 team, and he made further appearances for the team when the Pakistan under-19s returned the tour in October 1996.

Nagamootoo was Guyana's first-choice wicket-keeper for almost a decade, playing his last matches during the 2004–05 season. However, he did miss part of the 2001–02 season when he was recovering from a car accident. Nagamootoo had little success as a batsman, averaging 17.89 from 61 first-class matches and 21.00 from 31 List A matches. He scored only one century for Guyana during his career, an innings of 115 not out against West Indies B during the 2002–03 Carib Beer Cup. He and Reon Griffith put on an unbeaten 198-run partnership for the ninth wicket, which set a new Guyanese record.
