= Dennis George =

West Indian cricketer (born 1983)

Dennis Martin George (born 3 November 1983 in St Patricks, Grenada) is a West Indies cricketer who played first-class and List A cricket for the Windward Islands.
