= Alton Crafton =

Saint Lucian cricketer (born 1969)

Personal information
- Born: 17 December 1969 (age 56); Saint Lucia
- Source: Cricinfo, 25 November 2020

Alton Crafton (born 17 December 1969) is a Saint Lucian cricketer. He played in eight first-class and nineteen List A matches for the Windward Islands from 1991 to 2003.

== See also ==
- List of Windward Islands first-class cricketers
