= Grenada national cricket team =

Cricket team representing Grenada

Grenada

Personnel
- Captain: Devon Smith (2-day); Andre Fletcher (20-over)
- Coach: Ricky Williams

Team information
- Colours: Yellow, Red
- Home ground: Queen's Park; various

History
- Four Day wins: n/a
- WICB Cup wins: n/a
- Twenty20 wins: 0
- Official website: None

The Grenada national cricket team represents the country of Grenada in cricket. The team is not a member of the International Cricket Council, but the Grenada Cricket Association is a member of the Windward Islands Cricket Board of Control, which itself is a member association of the West Indies Cricket Board, and players from Grenada generally represent the Windward Islands cricket team at domestic level and the West Indies at international level. Grenada has however played as a separate entity in matches which held Twenty20 status, but has not appeared in first-class or List A cricket. The team's coach, as of November 2013, is Ricky Williams. The team currently has two captains: Devon Smith, who captains the two-day team, and Andre Fletcher who captains the 20-over team.

== History ==
A Grenada cricket team first appeared in West Indian cricket in 1887 against a touring Gentlemen of America team at the old Queen's Park. Ten years later the team was recorded playing against Lord Hawke's touring team, though unlike several matches during the tour, this match did not have first-class status. In 1899, G. A. de Freitas and William Mignon became the first Grenada cricketers to play first-class cricket. In 1910, Grenada played in the inaugural Cork Windward Islands Challenge Cup, with the team participating in that tournament until 1939. There is a long gap between 1939 and Grenada's next recorded appearance, which came in the 1965 Windward Islands Tournament against St Vincent. By this time the Windward Islands were playing matches which held first-class status, with Queen's Park playing host to the team's inaugural first-class fixture in 1959 against the Marylebone Cricket Club. Grenada continued to play in the Windward Islands Tournament, and from 1975 its successor, the Heineken Trophy. Their participation in the tournament (under various names) continued into the 1990s, with home matches throughout this period being held at the old Queen's Park.

In 2000, just months after a major redevelopment, the old Queen's Park was severely damaged by Hurricane Ivan, necessitating its reconstruction in 2004. Having played in regional tournaments throughout the early to mid 2000s, Grenada were invited to take part in the 2006 Stanford 20/20, whose matches held official Twenty20 status. They played three matches in the tournament, defeating Dominica and Saint Vincent and the Grenadines in the first-round and quarter-final respectively, before losing to Guyana in the semi-finals. Two years later, they were invited to take part in the 2008 Stanford 20/20, playing two matches in the tournament, defeating Anguilla in the first-round, before losing to Barbados in the following round. These matches mark Grenada's only major appearances in cricket.

In August 2014, Grenada played against Bangladesh in a 50 over game during Bangladesh's tour of the West Indies. Bangladesh ran out winners by 95 runs.

== Notable players ==
=== International players ===
Five players from Grenada have represented the West Indies internationally.

- Apps denotes the number of appearances the player has made.
- Runs denotes the number of runs scored by the player.
- Wkts denotes the number of wickets taken by the player.

Name	International career	Apps	Runs	Wkts	Apps	Runs	Wkts	Apps	Runs	Wkts	References
Name	International career	Tests			ODIs			T20Is			References
Junior Murray	1992–2002	33	918	0	55	678	0	–	–	–	
Rawl Lewis	1997–2009	5	89	4	28	291	22	1	0	0	
Devon Smith	2003–2015	36	1,500	0	47	1,059	0	6	203	0	
Andre Fletcher	2008–2015	–	–	–	15	256	0	22	347	0	
Nelon Pascal	2009–2010	2	12	0	1	0	0	–	–	–	

Many other Grenadian players have represented the Windward Islands cricket team domestically in the West Indies Regional Super50, Regional Four Day Competition and the Caribbean Twenty20.

=== Grenada players on the current Windward Islands cricket team ===
- Devon Smith
- Andre Fletcher
- Nelon Pascal
- Denis Smith

=== See also ===
- List of Windward Islands first-class cricketers
- List of Grenada Twenty20 players

== Squad ==
Players with international caps are listed in bold.

No.	Name	Birth date	Batting style	Bowling style	Notes
Batsmen
-	**Devon Smith**	21 October 1981 (age 44)	Left-handed	Right arm off break	2-day Captain
-	Linden Lawrence	5 October 1988 (age 37)	Right-handed	-	
-	Heron Campbell	23 December 1987 (age 38)	Right-handed	Right arm off break	
-	Tade Carmichael	4 October 1989 (age 36)	Left-handed	Right arm off break	
-	Keone George		Right-handed	Right arm off break	
-	Nicosi St Hilaire		Right-handed		
All-rounders
-	Ronald Etienne	19 November 1986 (age 39)	Right-handed	Left arm Slow left-arm orthodox	
-	Rudolph Paul	(age 20)	Right-handed	Right arm off break	
-	Micah Narine		Right-handed	Right arm fast-medium	
-	Akim Alexis		Right-handed	Right arm fast-medium	
-	Deron Hypolite	(age 19)	Right-handed	Right arm off break	
-	Denroy Charles	8 October 1984 (age 41)	Right-handed	Right arm off break	
Wicket-keepers
-	**Andre Fletcher**	28 November 1987 (age 38)	Right-handed	Right arm medium-fast	T20 Captain
-	Denis Smith	30 October 1991 (age 34)	Right-handed	-	
Bowlers
-	**Nelon Pascal**	25 April 1987 (age 39)	Right-handed	Right arm fast	
-	Dennis George	3 December 1983 (age 42)	Left-handed	Left arm Slow left-arm orthodox	
-	Preston McSween	15 August 1995 (age 30)	Right-handed	Left arm fast-medium	
-	Eamon Alexander				
-	Josh Thomas	(age 21)	Right-handed	Right arm fast-medium	

- Grenada v Bangladesh - August 2014
- Grenada Squad - 2014 Windward Championship
- Grenada Squads - 2013 T20 & 2-day

== Stanford 20/20 ==
- 2006 Grenada Stanford 20/20 Squad
- 2008 Grenada Stanford 20/20 Squad

== National cricket stadium ==
Stadium	Country	Capacity
National Cricket Stadium	Grenada	20,000
