= YMPC Cricket Club =

Cricket club in Barbados

YMPC Cricket Club is a cricket club in Barbados. The club plays in the Barbados Cricket Association Division 1 championship. The club is part of the Young Men's Progressive Club of Barbados, established in 1935 for "lower middle income whites and near whites for whom there was no space in Pickwick and Wanderers [cricket clubs]". Changes in Barbadian society meant that from the 1960s onwards, the membership of YMPC gradually came to reflect the general Barbadian population. YMPC's home ground is at Beckles Road, Saint Michael. The club motto is "Mens sana in corpore sano".

YMPC won the 2006 Division 1 championship—the club's third—only eight years after a mass exodus of leading players threatened the future of the club. The club's previous championship was shared with Empire Cricket Club in 1991.

== Notable players ==
- Fidel Edwards
- Joel Garner
- Collis King
- Dwayne Smith
