= St. Catherine Sport and Social Club =

St. Catherine Sport and Social Club is a cricket club in Barbados. The club competes in the Barbados Cricket Association Division 1 championship with its home ground at Bayfield, Saint Philip. Unlike other Barbadian clubs such as Pickwick, Wanderers and Carlton, St Catherine began as a club primarily for the black population.

The club was originally a member of the Barbados Cricket League before being admitted to the elite Barbados Cricket Association in the 1970s. The club was admitted to Division 1 in 1978. St Catherine have won the Division 1 championship on three occasions, 2008, 1997 and 1981.

Cricketers from St Catherine include West Indies Test wicket-keeper Thelston Payne.
