= Wes Hall =

Barbadian cricketer & politician (born 1937)

Sir Wes Hall
Personal information
- Full name: Wesley Winfield Hall
- Born: 12 September 1937 (age 89); Glebe Land, Station Hill, St Michael, Barbados
- Height: 6 ft 5 in (1.96 m)
- Batting: Right-handed
- Bowling: Right-arm fast
- Role: Fast bowler

International information
- National side: West Indies
- Test debut (cap 104): 28 November 1958 v India
- Last Test: 3 March 1969 v New Zealand

Domestic team information
- Years: Team
- 1955/56–1970/71: Barbados
- 1961/62–1962/63: Queensland
- 1966/67–1969/70: Trinidad

Career statistics
Competition	Test	FC	LA
Matches	48	170	2
Runs scored	818	2,674	–
Batting average	15.73	15.10	–
100s/50s	0/2	1/6	–
Top score	50*	102*	–
Balls bowled	10,421	28,095	108
Wickets	192	546	3
Bowling average	26.38	26.14	23.66
5 wickets in innings	9	19	0
10 wickets in match	1	2	0
Best bowling	7/69	7/51	2/53
Catches/stumpings	11/–	58/–	0/–
- Source: CricketArchive, 16 July 2011

Sir Wesley Winfield Hall (born 12 September 1937) is a Barbadian former cricketer and politician. A tall, strong and powerfully built man, Hall was a genuine fast bowler and despite his very long run up, he was renowned for his ability to bowl long spells. Hall played 48 Test matches for the West Indies from 1958 to 1969. Hall's opening bowling partnership with fellow Barbadian Charlie Griffith was a feature of the strong West Indies teams throughout the 1960s. Hall was one of the most popular cricketers of his day and was especially popular in Australia, where he played two seasons in the Sheffield Shield with Queensland.

A wicket-keeper/batsman as a schoolboy, Hall did not take up fast bowling until relatively late. He was included in the West Indies squad to tour England in 1957 having only played one match of first-class cricket. He made his Test cricket debut against India in 1958 and was instantly successful. He took a Test hat-trick in Pakistan in 1959, the first West Indian cricketer to do so. Hall bowled the final over in two famous Test matches, the Tied Test against Australia in 1960 and the Lord's Test against England in 1963. Years of non-stop cricket and resultant injury reduced Hall's effectiveness in the latter part of his Test career.

After his playing days Hall entered Barbadian politics, serving in both the Barbados Senate and House of Assembly and appointed Minister of Tourism in 1987. He was also involved in the administration of West Indies cricket as a selector and team manager and served as President of the West Indies Cricket Board from 2001 to 2003. Hall was later ordained a minister in the Christian Pentecostal Church. He is a member of the ICC Cricket Hall of Fame and the West Indies Cricket Hall of Fame. In the 2012 Birthday Honours he was knighted for services to sport and the community.

== Early life and career ==
Hall was born in Saint Michael, Barbados—"just outside the walls of [HM Prison] Glendairy"—to a teenaged mother, his father a sometime light-heavyweight boxer. Hall began his schooling at St Giles' Boys' School and later obtained a place at the renowned Combermere School thanks to a free scholarship. At Combermere, he played for the school cricket team initially as a wicketkeeper/batsman. At the time the leading schools in Barbados played against grown men in the elite Division 1 of the Barbados Cricket Association and Hall was exposed to a high standard of cricket at an early age. One of his teammates at Combermere was the school groundskeeper, the West Indian Test cricketer Frank King.

After completing his schooling, Hall found employment with the cable office in Bridgetown. Hall played for the Cable Office cricket team and it was there that Hall took up fast bowling. In a match against Wanderers, Hall was asked to fill in when his team's regular opening bowler was absent. He took six wickets that day and decided that bowling would be his path to the West Indies team. His talent was soon recognised and in 1956 he was included in the Barbados team to play E. W. Swanton's XI in 1956. Hall, still very young and inexperienced, did not take a wicket in the match, his first-class cricket debut. Hall was unlucky, however, not to pick up a wicket having Colin Cowdrey dropped by Kenneth Branker at first slip. Despite the lack of success Hall did catch the eye of Swanton who marked him down as a bowler of "great promise".

Based partly on this promise, Hall was selected in the West Indian squad to tour England in 1957. Despite great enthusiasm, Hall struggled in the unfamiliar surroundings, unable to pitch the ball anywhere near the wicket. Hall remarked later "When I hit the softer wickets I was like a fish out of water." Hall did not play in any of the Test matches and in first-class matches on the tour as a whole took 27 wickets at an average of 33.55. Hall's lack of success in England saw him overlooked for the entire home Test series against Pakistan in 1957–58.

== Test career ==
=== Debut and hat-trick ===
Originally left out of the West Indies team to tour India and Pakistan in 1958–59, Hall was called into the team as a backup for the Trinidadian Jaswick Taylor after the all-rounder Frank Worrell withdrew from the team at a late stage. Hall met with some success an early match against Baroda, taking 5 wickets for 41 runs (5/41) in Baroda's second innings. This performance saw Hall overtake Taylor to become the first-choice partner of Roy Gilchrist in the Test team. The pair had a highly successful Test series against the Indians with Wisden Cricketers' Almanack describing the duo as "two fearsome opening bowlers reminiscent of the days of [Manny] Martindale and [Learie] Constantine."

Hall made his debut in the first Test against India at Brabourne Stadium at Bombay and met with almost instant success. He dismissed the Indian opener Nari Contractor for a duck and quickly followed than with the wickets of Pankaj Roy and Vijay Manjrekar. In what ended as a dour draw, Hall finished with 3/35 in the first innings and 1/72 in the second. When Gilchrist was dropped from the second Test at Modi Stadium in Kanpur, Hall—in only his second Test match—was given the responsibility of leading the West Indies bowling attack. Hall was equal to the task, playing "a decisive part in India's downfall" taking 11 wickets in the match. Over the entire five Test series—won by the West Indies three Tests to nil—Hall and Gilchrist terrorised the Indian batsman, who had neither the "experience or the physical capacity" to stand up to the West Indian fast bowling duo.

The West Indies were not as successful in the three Test series against Pakistan, losing the first two Tests before winning the final Test—the first time Pakistan had lost a Test match at home. Hall bowled well in both the matches, however. In the second Test at Dacca, Hall relied on movement through the air rather than sheer pace and had Pakistan reeling on stage, five wickets down for only 22 runs made (22–5) In the third Test at Bagh-e-Jinnah in Lahore, Hall made history by becoming the first West Indian to take a hat-trick in Test cricket. His victims were Mushtaq Mohammad (aged 15 and in his debut Test match, at the time the youngest cricketer to play Test cricket), Nasim-ul-Ghani and Fazal Mahmood.

Hall once again performed well when England toured the West Indies in 1959–60. Wisden remarked that Hall "with a lovely action, genuine speed and remarkable stamina" was "always the biggest threat to England." Hall came close to winning the third Test at Sabina Park in Jamaica for the West Indies on the first day when England were reduced to 165/5 at stumps, Hall having captured five of the wickets to fall. Only Colin Cowdrey was able to stand in his way with Hall finishing the innings with 7/69, his best bowling figures in Test cricket. In the third Test in a placid pitch at Bourda in British Guiana, Hall again broke the back of England's batting taking six wickets for 90 runs in the England first innings. This included bowling M. J. K. Smith out for a duck for the second Test in a row. Hall played alongside his great partner Charlie Griffith in Test cricket for the first time in the fifth Test at Port of Spain. By this stage, Hall had "burned himself out" and he bowled only four overs in the England second innings as the West Indies pushed for a series-equalling win. Unfortunately for the West Indies and Hall, England held on for a draw and won the series one Test to nil.

In April 1960, Hall began the first of his three seasons as a professional with Accrington Cricket Club in the Lancashire League. Hall was first offered a contract by Accrington for the 1959 season, which he turned down through loyalty to his employer in Barbados who had provided him with leave to tour England. Hall was a success in League cricket, capturing 100 wickets in the 1960 season, 106 wickets in the 1961 season (when Accrington won the Lancashire League championship) and 123 wickets in the 1962 season, falling just short of the then-League record. Hall also managed to capture 10 wickets in an innings on two occasions with Accrington, 10/57 against Burnley and 10/28 against Bacup.

Hall left Accrington in 1964 to take up a less restrictive contract with Great Chell Cricket Club in the Staffordshire League. During the 1964 season, Hall married his childhood sweetheart Shurla in Liverpool.

=== Success in Australia ===
Remember, Wes, if you bowl a no-ball you'll never be able to go back to Barbados!

— Frank Worrell to Hall before the final ball of the Tied Test,

The 1960–61 Test series against Australia is one of the most famous in the history of Test cricket and Hall played a major role in its outcome. The first Test in the series at the Gabba in Brisbane had a thrilling finish. The West Indies set Australia a target of 233 runs to win the match. Hall broke through early, taking the wickets of Bob Simpson and Neil Harvey, followed, after some stubborn resistance, by Norm O'Neill. The West Indies captain Frank Worrell then dismissed Colin McDonald before Hall struck again for his fourth wicket, Les Favell caught by Joe Solomon. Australia were 57/5 and the West Indies seemed set to win the match. After the sixth Australian wicket fell with Australia having made only 92 runs, the Australian captain Richie Benaud came to the crease to join Alan Davidson. Together the pair took Australia to 226/7 and now Australia looked assured victors with only 7 runs to get. Joe Solomon then turned the game again with a direct hit on the stumps to run out Davidson. Hall was entrusted by his captain Worrell to bowl the last over of the day with Australia needing four runs and West Indies needing three wickets to win the game. In one of the most exciting finishes in Test match history, Hall had Benaud caught behind, then dropped a catch and two Australian batsmen were run out trying to make the winning run. The match finished in a tie, the first in Test cricket.

Hall bowled well in the second Test at the Melbourne Cricket Ground, taking 4/51 in the first innings and another two wickets "bowling at his fastest" in the second innings in which Australia comfortably made the 70 runs they needed to win the Test. The pitches used in the remaining three Test of the series favoured slow bowling and Hall did not play as large a role from that point on. West Indies won the third Test, the fourth Test was a thrilling draw but Australia won the final Test, at Melbourne again, to win the series two Tests to one. Over the course of the series both teams had striven to play bright, attractive cricket and the Australian public took the West Indian team to their hearts. Hall and the West Indies were farewelled with a ticker-tape parade through the streets of Melbourne. Hundreds of thousands of Australians keen to express their appreciation for the team brought the city to a standstill and reportedly brought Hall and his teammates to tears. Hall later described the spontaneous display of affection from the public as one usually "reserved for royalty or the Beatles".

His popularity in Australia saw Hall invited to play with Queensland for the 1961–62 Sheffield Shield season. Hall enjoyed an immensely successful season with Queensland and a key part of the team's second place in the Sheffield Shield competition—behind perennial powerhouse New South Wales. Hall took 43 wickets for the season at an average of 20.25, trailing only Richie Benaud of New South Wales in the season aggregate. Hall's 43 wickets set a new record for a Queensland bowler in a first-class cricket season. Hall returned for a second season with Queensland in 1962–63, taking 33 wickets for the season as Queensland again finished runner-up in the Sheffield Shield, this time to Victoria. Towards the end of Hall's second season, it became clear that the demands of playing cricket 12 months of the year were starting to take a toll on Hall. Queensland were keen to see Hall return for another season in 1963–64 but Hall declined, fearing his body would not stand up to the strain.

=== Finest hour ===
After his first season with Queensland, Hall returned to the Caribbean to join the West Indies team in their Test series against India in 1962. Hall took up where he left off against the Indians two years before. The Indians were a better batting team than the one Hall destroyed in the sub-continent in 1960 but they were still unable to come to terms with his pace. The West Indies won the series 5 Tests to nil and Hall took 27 wickets at an average of 15.74. When the second Test at Sabina Park was heading towards what looked to be a tame draw on a placid pitch, Hall broke the game wide open with some "grand bowling", taking 6/49 and West Indies won the match by an innings. In the fourth Test at Queens Park Oval, Hall was part of a 93-run partnership for the last wicket, making 50 runs himself. He then scythed through the Indian top order, taking the first five wickets of the innings to have India at 30/5 at one stage, a position they could not recover from.

Possessing a long hostile run-up to the wicket, with an equally long follow-through, Hall bowled as though he meant to take a wicket with every delivery. Nobody will ever forget his famous last day in the Test at Lord's when he bowled on and on, hour after hour.

— Wisden Cricketers' Almanack,

These efforts led him to achieve the No. 1 ranking in ICC Test Bowlers ranking for 1962.

The success of Hall and his fast bowling partner Griffith saw the arrival of the West Indies pace duo in England for the 1963 Test series "greeted with the public awe and press build-up formerly accorded to [the Australians] Ted McDonald and Jack Gregory or Ray Lindwall and Keith Miller." Before the tour, Hall and fellow professional cricketers Garry Sobers and Rohan Kanhai threatened to withdraw from the team unless paid the equivalent of their professional earnings they had forsaken. Only the intervention of captain Frank Worrell saw the three join the tour. The West Indies, with their "sparkling batting, bowling and fielding", won the series three Tests to one and captured the imagination of the English public. While Hall had a successful series—taking 16 wickets at an average of 33.37—it was Griffith who was the main destroyer for the West Indies. Hall was "the ideal foil" for Griffith and played an invaluable support role. As a partnership, Hall and Griffith were "the centre of attraction and the key to victory".

Analysis of film footage at this time showed Hall bowling at 103 mph. With Griffiths bowling from the other end batsmen had nowhere to hide.

Perhaps Hall's greatest performance of the English summer was in the second Test at Lord's. On the final day of the Test, Hall bowled unchanged for 200 minutes, broken only by the tea interval. As in the Tied Test in Brisbane three years earlier, Hall found himself bowling the final over of the match with both teams still capable of winning. In the innings as a whole Hall bowled 40 overs for a return of 4/93 but despite Hall's brave efforts, England managed to hold on for a draw—the England batsman Colin Cowdrey returned to the crease with a broken arm to help save the match. The Times said of Hall that day, "His energy was astonishing, his stamina inexhaustible, his speed awesome, from the first ball to the last". Hall himself claimed that it was his "finest hour". There was a sour note in the final Test at The Oval when Hall was informally warned about intimidatory bowling. Hall bowled two successive bouncers to the England opening batsman Brian Bolus, prompting umpire Syd Buller to speak with West Indies captain Worrell saying, "We don't want this sort of bowling to get out of hand otherwise I will have to speak to the bowler." Later than innings, Griffith was formally warned by the same umpire.

The Australian tour of the West Indies in 1964–65 was somewhat overshadowed by concerns about the bowling action of Griffith, whom the visitors considered a "chucker". Regardless, Hall again started a Test series strongly. In the first Test at Sabina Park—Hall's favourite hunting ground—Hall took 5/60 in the first innings and then 4/45 in the second to play a leading role in the West Indies victory. Wisden was of the opinion that Hall "probably never bowled faster or straighter." It was "the most important single contribution of bowling in the five Tests" but Hall was not as effective in the remainder of the series, taking only seven wickets in the following four Tests. West Indies held on to win the series two Tests to one—the first time the West Indies defeated Australia in a Test series.

=== Exhausted volcano ===
The picture of Wesley Hall in full flow as he ran towards the wicket is still treasured in the memories of all but the opposing batsman—and maybe in theirs as well.

— Clayton Goodwin,

As a result of their huge support in 1963, the West Indies were invited to tour England again only three years later. Despite the England press and public fearing the impact of Hall and his partner Griffith, it was soon clear that their powers had waned somewhat since 1963. Hall's "action was as poetic as ever and his commitment was just as great, but something was missing." He captured 18 wickets in the five Tests at an average of 30.83. However, Hall was still considered "the key man of the [West Indies] attack" and on occasion was still as damaging as ever. His finest moment of the series was in the fourth Test at Headingley where a "spell of eighty minutes by Hall at his fastest and best destroyed England" aiding his team to win the match by an innings and 55 runs and wrap up the series and the Wisden Trophy.

In 1966, the Trinidad-based company West Indian Tobacco (WITCO) engaged Hall on a three-year contract to promote youth cricket in Trinidad and Tobago, including playing for the Trinidad and Tobago national team in the Shell Shield, the West Indies first-class cricket championship. One of Hall's first roles for WITCO was to promote the Wes Hall Youth Cricket League, a new nation-wide junior cricket league.

Hall was a member of the West Indies team that toured India and Ceylon in 1966–67 but was a shadow of the bowler that cut a swathe through India in earlier series. He injured his left knee during a net session early in the tour and the sub-continental pitches neutered his speed. Hall started the first Test of the series at Bombay in style, capturing two early wickets in a "superb" spell, "worthy of a great fast bowler" but did not take another wicket in the match. Wisden said of Hall's efforts in the series; "He could not bowl with the sustained hostility of old, and his form was erratic."

The slow decline of Hall as an effective Test match bowler became clearer after the home series against England in 1967–68. Hall "bowled with his old enthusiasm" in the second Test at Kingston, albeit on a pitch described by Wisden as "crazy paving" but as the series continued the England batsmen took a heavy toll on Hall and his long-time partner Griffith. Still, such was their prestige and their perceived psychological advantage over the English that the West Indies selectors stuck with the pair for the entire series. In the four Tests he played, Hall took only 9 wickets and those at an average of 39.22. In a summary of the tour Wisden said "In the event Hall proved to be little more than a shadow of the great fast bowler he had been. His pace was no longer to be feared ..."

The West Indies captain Garry Sobers had to fight with the selectors to have Hall included in the West Indies team to tour Australia and New Zealand in 1968–69. The West Indies Test selection panel told Sobers that Hall was "past his best" and that he would be left out of the team. Sobers still considered Hall one of the best bowlers in the Caribbean and insisted on his selection, threatening to withdraw from the tour himself if he did not get his man in the squad. The selectors eventually conceded and Hall was included in the touring party but—according to Sobers — one of the selectors was told to tell Hall he was only picked because of pressure from the captain. As it turned out Hall only played in two of the Tests in Australia with Wisden noting that "old age, as cricketers go, had finally had its say". The once fearsome pair of Hall and Griffith now "resembled exhausted volcanoes." Hall played the first Test against New Zealand at Eden Park in Auckland. Hall sustained an injury and was not able to complete the match, having bowled only 16 overs for the match and taking a solitary wicket. Hall was still unfit to play by the time the second Test started and never again played Test cricket.

== After Test cricket ==
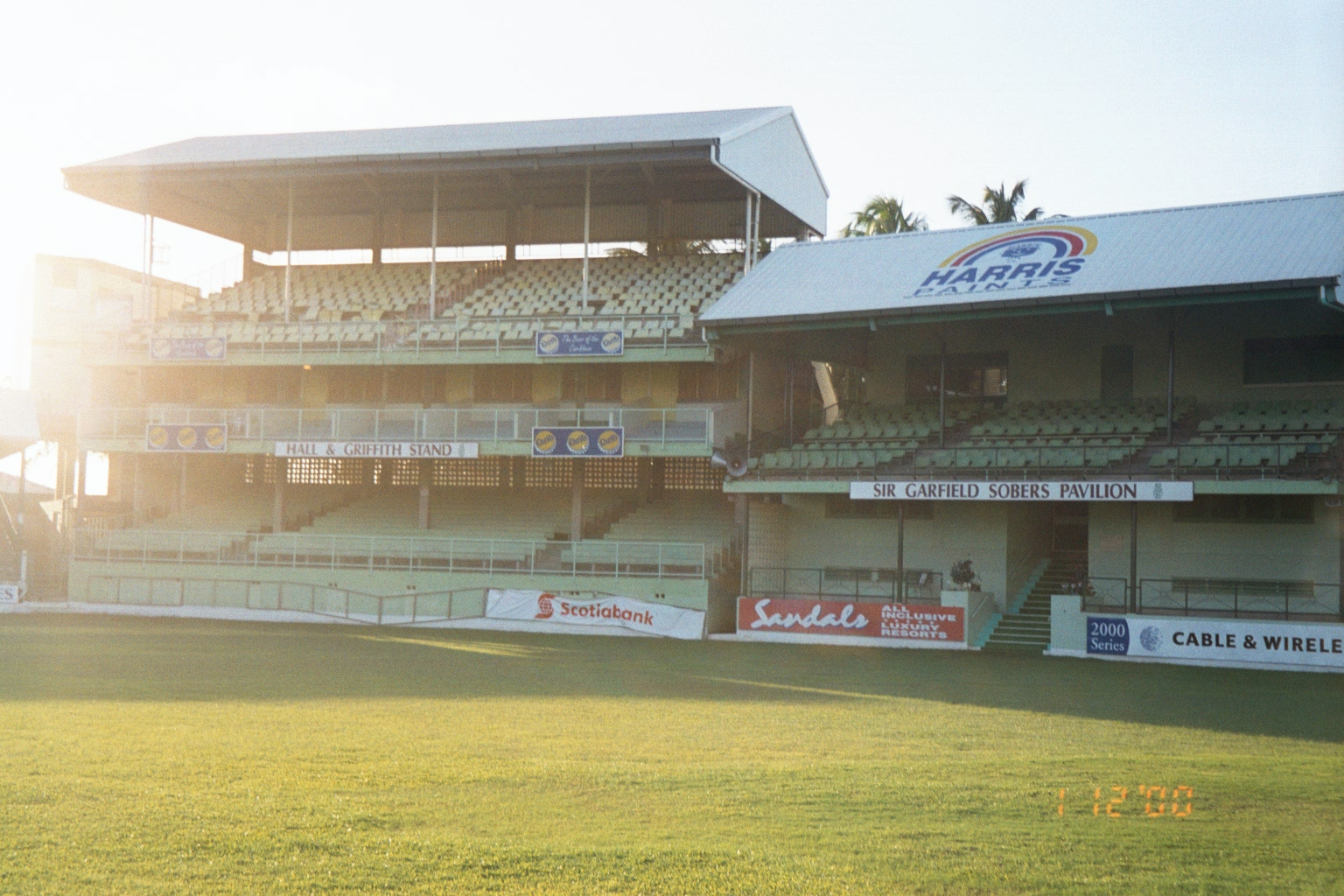
The Hall & Griffith Stand (left) at Kensington Oval in Bridgetown in 2000. The stand was redeveloped in preparation for the 2007 Cricket World Cup.

After the New Zealand tour, Hall joined the Barbados team for a short tour of England. Hall played two first-class matches on the tour, capturing two wickets at an average of 53.00. Hall then returned to Trinidad to complete his last season in the Shell Shield and his contract with WITCO. Hall met with moderate success, taking 15 wickets for Trinidad at a respectable average of 22.46. Hall's last first-class match was for Barbados against the touring Indians in 1971.

Before Hall left Trinidad in 1970, Gerard Pantin — a Catholic priest in the Holy Ghost Fathers order — asked Hall if he would assist him in forming a humanitarian program to assist the poor and marginalised residents of the Laventille community. Hall agreed and together the two men walked through the dangerous neighbourhood, simply asking the residents how they could help them. This mission grew to become the SERVOL (Service Volunteered For All) voluntary organisation that now operates throughout Trinidad and Tobago and elsewhere in the Caribbean. While Hall returned to Barbados three months after the program started, he is recognised as one of SERVOL's co-founders.

Hall has served Barbados and West Indian cricket in a variety of roles since the end of his playing days including chairing the West Indies selection panel for some years. Hall also accompanied many touring West Indies teams as manager, including the ill-fated 1995 tour of England, marred by player unrest. In 2001 Hall was elected president of the West Indies Cricket Board. During his time as president Hall was instrumental in attracting the 2007 Cricket World Cup to the West Indies. Hall also developed a system of collective bargaining with the West Indies Players' Association. Hall chose not to stand for re-election in 2003, citing health problems. Hall was a member of the board of directors of the Stanford 20/20 cricket project.

You think my run up was long. Now you should hear my speeches.

— Wes Hall, after his appointment as a Senator,

At the end of his career as a cricketer, Hall reflected, "I realised that I’d been playing for ten years, and I was married with three children and I didn’t have any money." After working with SERVOL in Trinidad, Hall "knew from that moment on, [he] would commit [his] life to service." He studied Industrial Relations and Human Resource Management at the Industrial Society in London and then returned to Cable and Wireless in Barbados to take a role as Regional Staff Welfare Manager. As well as his role with WITCO in Trinidad, Hall also had high-profile roles in private enterprise with Banks Barbados Brewery and Sandals Resorts.

Hall became involved in Barbadian politics, joining the Democratic Labour Party. First appointed to the Barbados Senate, Hall was later elected to the House of Assembly. Hall was elected as the representative for the Assembly constituency of St. Michael West Central in 1986 and re-elected in 1991. In 1987, Hall was appointed Minister of Tourism and Sports in the Government of Barbados. As Tourism Minister, Hall has been given credit for developing the sports tourism market in Barbados.

On a visit to Florida in 1990, Hall attended a Christian religious service. Impressed by the preacher, during the service, Hall "made a very serious decision to give [his] heart and life to God." Hall attended Bible school and was later ordained a minister in the Christian Pentecostal Church. Notably, Hall ministered to fellow Barbadian fast bowler Malcolm Marshall while Marshall was dying from colon cancer.

Hall is a member of the West Indies Cricket Hall of Fame. and the ICC Cricket Hall of Fame. For his work in tourism, Hall has been awarded the Caribbean Tourism Organisation's Lifetime Achievement Award. The University of the West Indies awarded Hall an honorary Doctorate of Laws in 2005. Hall and fellow Barbadian fast bowler Charlie Griffith have a grandstand at Kensington Oval named after them—the Hall & Griffith Stand. Hall was knighted in the 2012 Birthday Honours for services to sport and the community.

== Style and personality ==
Hall had a magnificent, bounding approach, eyes bulging, teeth glinting, crucifix flying, climaxing in a classical cartwheel action and intimidating followthrough.

— David Frith,

Hall was a tall and muscular cricketer, 6 feet 5 inches (196 cm) tall and bearing the "physique and strength of a bodybuilder." He had a graceful, classical action and one of the longest run-ups in Test cricket. A genuinely fast bowler, he was timed at 91 miles per hour (146 km/h). Hall was able to sustain pace and hostility for very long spells—during the Test against England at Lord's in 1963 he bowled unchanged for over three hours on the final day. While Hall was an aggressive fast bowler, he was not one to set out to injure the batsman. The England cricketer Ted Dexter—himself hit several times by Hall—said "there was never a hint of malice in [Hall] or in his bowling". Hall himself said after one of his deliveries fractured Australian cricketer Wally Grout's jaw "It made me sick to see Wal leaving and it made me sicker to hear some jokers in the crowd ranting on as though I had intentionally hurt [Grout]".

While Hall could never be described as an all-rounder, on occasions he was an effective batsman. His one century in first-class cricket was against Cambridge University Cricket Club at Fenner's—scored in 65 minutes, the fastest century of the 1963 English season. Wisden said of this innings, "[Hall's] batting promised so much ... [he] made his runs in the classic mould, not in the unorthodox manner usually adopted by fast bowlers." With his characteristic humour, Hall said of this innings, "Ah, but it wasn't any old hundred, it was against the intelligentsia."

Hall was one of the most popular cricketers of his day. The Australian commentator Johnnie Moyes described Hall as "a rare box-office attraction, a man who caught and held the affections of the paying public." Hall was particularly popular in Australia. When invited back to play for Queensland in the Sheffield Shield in 1961–62, Hall arrived in Brisbane to "scenes more in keeping with the arrival of a pop star, a thousand people jamming the old terminal building at Eagle Farm airport to welcome him." Hall was fond of a bet and was a keen follower of horseracing. Hall is known as a good humoured man; C. L. R. James observed "Hall simply exudes good nature at every pore." Tony Cozier states "[Hall] is renowned for his entertaining, if prolonged oratory, as well as for his tardiness."

== Publications ==
- Pace Like Fire (1965)
- Answering the Call: The extraordinary life of Sir Wesley Hall by Paul Akeroyd (2022)
