= Wildey Sports and Cultural Club =

Wildey Sports and Cultural Club is a cricket club in Barbados. The club competes in the Barbados Cricket Association Elite Division competition, the premier cricket competition in Barbados. The club was established in 1964 for and by employees of Banks Brewery, a leading brewery in Barbados and until 2014 was called Banks Sports and Cultural Club Until 2013, the club played at the Brewery Ground; it now plays at the Samuel Jackman Prescod Institute of Technology at Pine Hill.

Unlike some Barbadian clubs established before the 1960s such as Pickwick, Wanderers and Carlton, Wildey began as a club primarily for black Barbadians.

Admitted to Division 1 in 1973, Banks/Wildey has since won the Division 1 championship six times: 1978, 1979, 1986, 2001, 2002 and 2007.

Notable cricketers from the club include:

- Malcolm Marshall.
- Gordon Greenidge
- Vanburn Holder
- Sherwin Campbell.
- Carlos Brathwaite.
