= Banks Holding Sports and Cultural Club Ground =

Cricket ground in Bridgetown, Barbados

Banks Holdings Sports and Cultural Club Ground
- Interactive map of Banks Holdings Sports and Cultural Club Ground

Ground information
- Location: Bridgetown, Barbados
- Country: Barbados
- Coordinates: 13.0927°N 59.5892°W
- Establishment: 1964

Team information
Barbados	(2005/06)
- As of 24 April 2022; Source: Ground profile

Banks Holdings Sports and Cultural Club Ground was a cricket ground in Bridgetown, Barbados.

== History ==
The ground was established in 1964, when the Banks Sports and Cultural Club was founded for the workers of the Banks Brewery. Having hosted club cricket matches for most of its history, the ground played host to two List A one-day matches in the 2005–06 KFC Cup between Guyana and Jamaica, and Barbados and the Leeward Islands. Banks Sports and Cultural Club used the ground until 2013, with the adjoining brewery closing and moving to a new facility at Newton Terrace. With the closure of the brewery, the club was renamed Wildey Sports and Cultural Club and moved to a new ground at the Samuel Jackman Prescod Institute of Technology in Pine Hill.

== Records ==
=== List A ===
- Highest team total: 267 for 6 (50 overs) by Barbados v Trinidad and Tobago, 2005–06
- Lowest team total:145 all out (38.1 overs) by Jamaica v Leeward Islands, 2005–06
- Highest individual innings: 90 not out by Courtney Browne for Barbados v Trinidad and Tobago, 2005–06
- Best bowling in an innings: 3-23 by Curtis Roberts for Leeward Islands v Jamaica, 2005–06

== See also ==
- List of cricket grounds in the West Indies
