= Empire Cricket Club =

- One Day name: Blues

Team information
- Founded: 1914
- Home ground: Bank Hall

History
- BCA Division 1 wins: 1970, 1971, 1989, 1991*, 1993, 1995, 1996, 2000, 2004

Empire Cricket Club is a cricket club in Barbados. The club plays in Barbados Cricket Association Division 1 championship. The club was formed on 24 May 1914—Empire Day—from which it took its name. The club was formed by a defection of disaffected members of Spartan Cricket Club, when Spartan had refused membership to the "socially inferior" Barbadian cricketer Herman Griffith in 1913.

Racial and social prejudice in Barbados cricket precluded the club from play in the Barbados first division cricket competition by two turn downs, until 1916 when a casting vote secured entry into the competition after a 2–2 vote. Wanderers and Harrison College supporting their inclusion while Pickwick and Spartan opposed it. Griffith's ties to Combermere School created a link between Empire and the school, with many Combermere old boys playing for the club.

The club is one of the most famous in Barbados and has been described as "the greatest club ever". David Harris stated that Empire is "... not just a club, it is part of the social revolution which took place in the last century, a part of the fight for equal rights of the masses of Barbados."

Former players include three cricketing knights:

- Sir Conrad Hunte
- Sir Everton Weekes
- Sir Frank Worrell, whose boyhood home overlooks the club ground.
