= Spartan Cricket Club =

Spartan Cricket Club is a cricket club in Barbados.

Spartan was formed in 1893 as a club for middle-class black and creole cricketers who were denied entry into all-white cricket clubs such as Wanderers and Pickwick. The inaugural president of the club was Sir William Conrad Reeves, Chief Justice of Barbados and other members consisted mostly of "lawyers, medical practitioners, elite schoolmasters, higher level civil servants and the few non-whites to have penetrated the managerial levels of the business, commercial and plantation worlds." The club played its matches at the Belleville ground in Saint Michael and the first captain of the club was George Learmond.

Cricket in Barbados at the time was strictly divided by colour and class. Spartan was seen as a middle-class club and in its early years efforts to admit working-class cricketers met with some resistance. In 1899, the club was divided about the admission of Fitz Hinds—a talented cricketer who had previously worked as a groundsman at Pickwick Cricket Club. After his admission, many of his team-mates refused to play with him. The club was split again in 1913 when Herman Griffith attempted to join the club. Considered "too poor to enter", he was denied admission. This attitude distressed a significant minority of the club who split and established a club for working-class blacks, Empire Cricket Club in 1914. Spartan and Empire developed a strong rivalry.

Before and after Barbadian independence, members of Spartan Cricket Club were influential members of Barbadian society, including Grantley Adams, the first Premier of Barbados. It is claimed that Spartan has "produced more [West Indies] Test cricketers than any other [club] in the Caribbean". The club now plays its games at Queen's Park in Bridgetown.

Notable cricketers from Spartan include:

- Sir Clyde Walcott.
- Wes Hall.
- Sulieman Benn.
- Shamarh Brooks.
