= Barbados Cricket Association =

Governing body of cricket in Barbados

The Barbados Cricket Association is the ruling body for cricket in Barbados. The BCA was established in 1933 by an Act of Parliament to replace the Barbados Cricket Challenge Cup Committee, which had administered Barbadian cricket since its formation in 1892. The current president, elected in August 2025, is Calvin Hope, who succeeded Conde Riley.

Of the seven teams which participate in the inaugural season in 1892, four are still competing today – Lodge, Harrison College, Pickwick and Wanderers. From this small beginning the cricket fraternity has grown to such an extent that there are now 128 teams representing 82 clubs participating in the BCA's competitions.

Steve Alleyne was the president of the Barbados Cricket Association from 2000 to 2004 and led the Barbados Local Organizing Committee for the 2007 Cricket World Cup.

The Barbados Cricket Association organizes cricket from the level of Under-13 Juniors to Test matches which it coordinates on behalf of the West Indies Cricket Board. The traditional domestic season now begins in May and concludes in December, the regional first-class season runs from January to March, and the international season begins in March and now extends through June.

From its earliest days Barbados has been renowned for the quality and calibre of its cricketers producing cricketers such as Challenor, Martindale, Weekes, Sobers, Hall. The teams dominate regional cricket, having won the regional championship on more than one occasion and this prowess has been transferred into the West Indies team.

== Division 1 championship ==
=== 2012 season ===
Clubs competing in the 2012 Elite Division championship. The 2011 championship was won by UWI.

Club	Home ground	2011 position
BDFSP	Paragon	6
Barbados Youth	Lester Vaughan, Cane Garden	12
Carlton	Desmond Haynes Oval, Black Rock	8
Empire	Bank Hall	4
Maple	Trents, St James	2
Pickwick	Foursquare Park, St Philip	7
Police	Police Sports Club Ground, Weymouth	-
St Catherine	Bayfield, St Philip	3
Spartan	Queen's Park	5
UWI	3Ws Oval	1

LIME, YMPC and Banks were relegated to First Division for the 2012 season and Police was promoted. Barbados Youth are exempt from relegation.

=== Previous champions ===
- 2011 UWI
- 2010 Spartan, UWI
- 2009 UWI
- 2008 St Catherine
- 2007 Banks
- 2006 YMPC
- 2005 Pickwick
- 2004 Empire
- 2003 Spartan
- 2002 Banks
- 2001 Banks
- 2000 Empire
- 1999 Police
- 1998 Police
- 1997 St Catherine
- 1996 Empire
- 1995 Empire
- 1994 Spartan, BET
- 1993 Empire
- 1992 Maple
- 1991 YMPC, Empire
- 1990
- 1989 Empire
- 1988 YMPC
- 1987 Police
- 1986 Banks
- 1985 Police
- 1984 Police
- 1983 Police
- 1982 Wanderers
- 1981 Carlton, St Catherine
- 1980
- 1979 Banks
- 1978 Banks
- 1977
- 1976
- 1975
- 1974
- 1973 BCL
- 1972
- 1971 Empire
- 1970 Empire
- 1958 Pickwick
- 1947 Garrison

== See also ==
- List of Barbadian cricketers
- Barbados national cricket team
- Barbados Tridents
- Sport in Barbados
