= Courtney Browne =

Barbadian cricketer

Personal information
- Full name: Courtney Oswald Browne
- Born: 7 December 1970 (age 55); Lambeth, London, England
- Batting: Right-handed
- Role: Wicket keeper

Career statistics
Competition	Test	ODI
Matches	20	46
Runs scored	387	415
Batting average	16.12	17.29
100s/50s	0/1	0/0
Top score	68	46*
Catches/stumpings	79/2	59/9
Medal record
Men's Cricket
Representing West Indies
ICC Champions Trophy
Winner	2004 England
- Source: Cricinfo, 25 January 2006

Courtney Oswald Browne (born 7 December 1970) is a former English-born cricketer. He is a right-handed wicketkeeping batsman. He is the only West Indian Test cricketer to have been born in England. He was a member of the West Indies team that won the 2004 ICC Champions Trophy, and had a major role in winning the final.

Browne was captaining Barbados when he got his first call up to the West Indies side in April 1995. He struggled to hold his place in the side and after 13 Tests he was dropped and didn't return until 3 years later for the ICC Knockout tournament in Kenya. He was soon dropped again, replaced by Ridley Jacobs. His career seemed over but he got a surprise recall for the 2004 ICC Champions Trophy in England. He was the hero in the final, his partnership with Ian Bradshaw saw them home at The Oval. After a year as first choice keeper he decided this time to leave on his own terms, retiring for 'personal reasons'.

He is a former captain of LIME Sports Club, and competed in the Barbados Cricket Association Division 1 championship.
