= Foursquare Park =

Cricket ground in Highland, Barbados

- Interactive map of Foursquare Park
- Location: Highland, Barbados
- Country: Barbados
- Coordinates: 13.1045°N 59.4854°W
- Establishment: 2009
- As of 23 April 2022; Source: Ground profile

Foursquare Park is a cricket ground in Highland, Barbados.

== History ==
As a result of the upgrading of the Kensington Oval for the 2007 Cricket World Cup, Pickwick Cricket Club were forced to vacate their historic home. The club developed a new homeground on land donated by Sir David Seale, the owner of the Foursquare Rum Distillery, in Highland, Saint Philip. The ground was opened in October 2009 by David Thompson, the Prime Minister of Barbados. Four months later, the ground held two first-class cricket matches in the 2009–10 Regional Four Day Competition, with Guyana playing Jamaica, and the Leeward Islands playing Trinidad and Tobago.

== Records ==
=== First-class ===
- Highest team total: 429 all out by Jamaica v Guyana, 2009–10
- Lowest team total: 156 all out by Leeward Islands v Trinidad and Tobago, 2009–10
- Highest individual innings: 151 by Wavell Hinds for Jamaica v Guyana, 2009–10
- Best bowling in an innings: 6–40 by David Bernard for Jamaica v Guyana, 2009–10
- Best bowling in a match: 9–83 by Wilden Cornwall for Leeward Islands v Trinidad and Tobago, 2009–10, as above

== See also ==
- List of cricket grounds in the West Indies
