= 2004 Champions Trophy final =

2004 ICC Champions Trophy Final
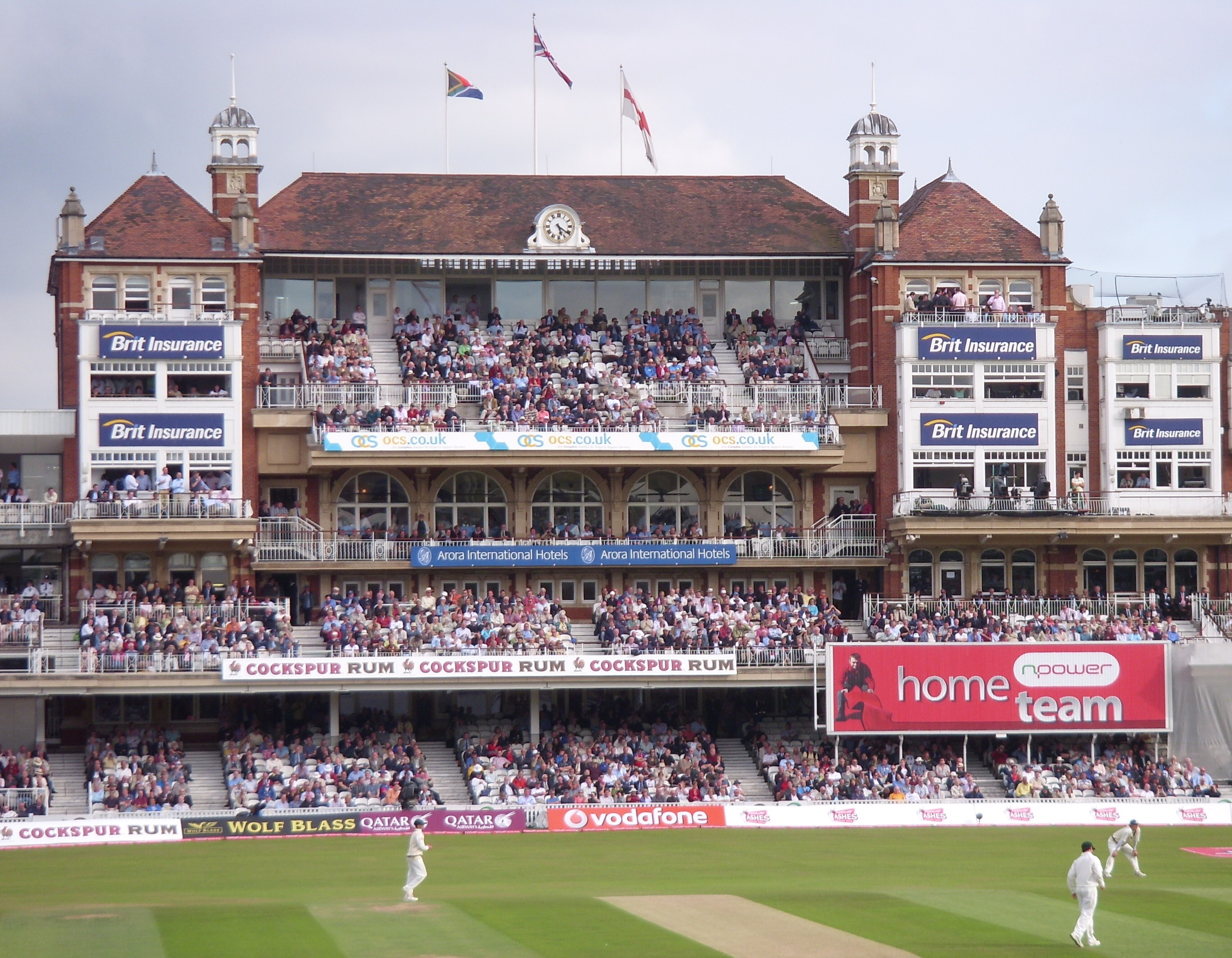
- Event: 2004 ICC Champions Trophy
England	West Indies
217	218/8
49.4	48.5
- West Indies won by 2 wickets
- Date: 25 September 2004
- Venue: The Oval, London
- Player of the match: Ian Bradshaw (WI)
- Umpires: Rudi Koertzen (SA) and Simon Taufel (Aus)
- Attendance: 18,600

The final of the 2004 ICC Champions Trophy was played on 25 September 2004 between West Indies and England at the Oval, London. England qualified into the final by defeating Australia in the first semi final at Edgbaston while West Indies defeated Pakistan at the Rose Bowl in the second semi final. West Indies won the final by 2 wickets at the Oval, winning the 2004 ICC Champions Trophy. This was their first major tournament win since the 1979 Cricket World Cup.

== Road to the final ==
=== First Semi-Final ===
The first semi final was played between Australia and England on 21 September 2004 at the Edgbaston, Birmingham. England won the toss and decided to field first. Australia scored 259 runs for 9 wickets in 50 overs, with Damien Martyn scoring 65 runs from 91 balls. Darren Gough took 3 wickets giving away 48 runs in 7 overs. England, in the reply, chased the target of 260 runs in 46.3 overs losing 4 wickets. They won the match by 6 wickets and reached the final. Michael Vaughan scored 86 runs and received the man of the match award. With this victory, England achieved their first win over Australia since 17 June 1999 and ended a run of 14 consecutive defeats.

21 September 2004
Scorecard

Australia; 259/9 (50 overs)	v	England; 262/4 (46.3 overs)
Damien Martyn 65 (91); Darren Gough 3/48 (7 overs)		Michael Vaughan 86 (122); Brett Lee 2/65 (8.3 overs)

England won by 6 wickets
Edgbaston, Birmingham
Umpires: Billy Bowden (NZ) and Rudi Koertzen (SA)
Player of the match: Michael Vaughan (Eng)

- England won the toss and elected to field.

=== Second Semi-Final ===
West Indies played Pakistan in the second semi-final at the Rose Bowl, Southampton on 22 September 2004, and defeated them by 7 wickets. Pakistan won the toss and surprisingly elected to bat first on a pitch known for favouring the chasing teams. They scored 131 runs all out in 38.2 overs, with Yasir Hameed being the highest run-scorer—39 runs off 56 balls. West Indies achieved the target of 132 runs in 28.1 overs, their highest scorer was Ramnaresh Sarwan, with 56 not out. He was named the man of the match.

22 September 2004
Scorecard

Pakistan; 131 (38.2 overs)	v	West Indies; 132/3 (28.1 overs)
Yasir Hameed 39 (56); Corey Collymore 2/24 (9 overs)		Ramnaresh Sarwan 56* (85); Shoaib Akhtar 2/18 (7 overs)

West Indies won by 7 wickets
Rose Bowl, Southampton
Umpires: Darrell Hair (Aus) and Simon Taufel (Aus)
Player of the match: Ramnaresh Sarwan (WI)

- Pakistan won the toss and elected to bat.
- Salman Butt (Pak) made his ODI debut.

== Match details ==
=== Match officials ===
- On-field umpires: Rudi Koertzen (SA) and Simon Taufel (Aus)
- TV umpire: Darrell Hair (Aus)
- Reserve umpire: Jeff Evans (Eng)
- Match referee: Ranjan Madugalle (SL)

=== Summary ===
The final of the 2004 ICC Champions Trophy was played between West Indies and England at the Oval on 25 September 2004. West Indies made England bat first after winning the toss. Despite a century (104 runs) from Marcus Trescothick, England were restricted to 217 runs in 49.4 overs. Wavell Hinds and Ian Bradshaw took 3 and 2 wickets respectively. West Indies started their batting with the early losses of Hinds and Sarwan, and at one moment they were restricted to 147 runs for 8 wickets; the highest run-scorer Shivnarine Chanderpaul (47 runs) had also departed. Courtney Browne and Ian Bradshaw scored 35 and 34 not out respectively which was the highest scoring innings of both their respective careers at the time and guided West Indies to victory without any further loss. They chased the target in 48.5 overs, and Browne and Bradshaw shared an unbeaten 71 run ninth wicket partnership, a West Indian record. Andrew Flintoff took 3 wickets for 38 runs in 10 overs. Bradshaw was given the man of the match award for his all-round performance while Sarwan was named the man of the tournament.

25 September
Scorecard

England; 217 (49.4 overs)	v	West Indies; 218/8 (48.5 overs)
Marcus Trescothick 104 (124); Wavell Hinds 3/24 (10 overs)		Shivnarine Chanderpaul 47 (66); Andrew Flintoff 3/38 (10 overs)

West Indies won by 2 wickets
The Oval, London
Umpires: Rudi Koertzen (SA) and Simon Taufel (Aus)
Player of the match: Ian Bradshaw (WI)

- West Indies won the toss and elected to field.

== Scorecard ==
England batting
Player	Status	Runs	Balls	4s	6s	Strike rate
Marcus Trescothick	run out (Lara/Gayle)	104	124	14	0	83.87
Vikram Solanki	c †Browne b Bradshaw	4	13	0	0	30.76
Michael Vaughan *	b Bradshaw	7	18	1	0	38.88
Andrew Strauss	run out (Bravo)	18	33	2	0	54.54
Andrew Flintoff	c Lara b WW Hinds	3	6	0	0	50.00
Paul Collingwood	c Chanderpaul b WW Hinds	16	40	1	0	40.00
Geraint Jones †	c Lara b WW Hinds	6	18	0	0	33.33
Ashley Giles	c Lara b Bravo	31	37	3	0	83.78
Alex Wharf	not out	3	6	0	0	50.00
Darren Gough	st †Browne b Gayle	0	1	0	0	0.00
Steve Harmison	run out	2	2	0	0	100.00
Extras	(b 1, lb 7, w 15)	23				
Total	(all out; 49.4 overs)	217		21	0	

Fall of wickets: 1/12 (Solanki, 4.2 ov), 2/43 (Vaughan, 10.3 ov), 3/84 (Strauss, 19.6 ov), 4/93 (Flintoff, 22.1 ov), 5/123 (Collingwood, 32.3 ov), 6/148 (Jones, 38.2 ov), 7/211 (Trescothick, 47.4 ov), 8/212 (Giles, 48.3 ov), 9/214 (Gough, 49.1 ov), 10/217 (Harmison, 49.4 ov)

West Indies bowling
Bowler	Overs	Maidens	Runs	Wickets	Econ	Wides	NBs
Ian Bradshaw	10	1	54	2	5.40	3	0
Corey Collymore	10	1	38	0	3.80	3	0
Chris Gayle	9.4	0	52	1	5.37	0	0
Dwayne Bravo	10	0	41	1	4.10	9	0
Wavell Hinds	10	3	24	3	2.40	0	0

West Indies batting
Player	Status	Runs	Balls	4s	6s	Strike rate
Chris Gayle	c & b Harmison	23	33	5	0	69.69
Wavell Hinds	c Solanki b Harmison	3	16	0	0	18.75
Ramnaresh Sarwan	c Strauss b Flintoff	5	7	1	0	71.42
Brian Lara *	c †Jones b Flintoff	14	28	2	0	50.00
Shivnarine Chanderpaul	c Vaughan b Collingwood	47	66	6	0	71.21
Dwayne Bravo	c †Jones b Flintoff	0	7	0	0	0.00
Ryan Hinds	c †Jones b Trescothick	8	19	1	0	42.10
Ricardo Powell	c Trescothick b Collingwood	14	16	2	0	87.50
Courtney Browne †	not out	35	55	2	0	63.63
Ian Bradshaw	not out	34	51	5	0	66.66
Corey Collymore						
Extras	(lb 11, nb 5, w 19)	35				
Total	(8 wickets; 48.5 overs)	218		24	0	

Fall of wickets: 1/19 (WW Hinds, 3.5 ov), 2/35 (Sarwan, 8.1 ov), 3/49 (Gayle, 9.4 ov), 4/72 (Lara, 16.3 ov), 5/80 (Bravo, 18.3 ov), 6/114 (Ryan, 24.5 ov), 7/135 (Powell, 29.2 ov), 8/147 (Chanderpaul, 33.4 ov)

England bowling
Bowler	Overs	Maidens	Runs	Wickets	Econ	Wides	NBs
Darren Gough	10	1	58	0	5.80	5	0
Steve Harmison	10	1	34	2	3.40	3	0
Andrew Flintoff	10	0	38	3	3.80	2	4
Alex Wharf	9.5	0	38	0	3.86	0	1
Marcus Trescothick	3	0	17	1	5.66	2	0
Paul Collingwood	6	0	22	2	3.66	1	0

Key

- * – Captain
- † – Wicket-keeper
- c Fielder – Indicates that the batsman was dismissed by a catch by the named fielder
- b Bowler – Indicates which bowler gains credit for the dismissal
