= Desmond Haynes Oval =

Cricket and football ground in Bridgetown, Guyana

- Carlton Club Ground
- Interactive map of Desmond Haynes Oval

Ground information
- Location: Bridgetown, Barbados
- Country: Barbados
- Coordinates: 13.1237°N 59.6257°W
- Establishment: 1940
- Capacity: 3,000

Team information
Barbados	(2005/06–2006/07)
- As of 22 April 2022; Source: Ground profile

The Desmond Haynes Oval (formerly known as the Carlton Club Ground) is a cricket and football ground in Bridgetown, Barbados.

== History ==
The Oval was established in 1940, with the foundation of the Carlton Club to cater for the lower-middle class White Barbadians. Named for the Barbadian cricketer Desmond Haynes, for much of its history the Oval has exclusively hosted matches in club cricket. This change in 1996, when the Oval had been due to host Barbados and a touring Free State side in a List A one-day match in 1996, but the match was abandoned. In 2005, it was a venue for two matches in the 2005–06 KFC Cup between the Leeward Islands and Trinidad and Tobago, and Guyana and the Windward Islands. With the Kensington Oval undergoing refurbishment to host matches in the 2007 Cricket World Cup, Barbados had to play their home matches in 2006 at various outgrounds across Barbados. The Oval was chosen as one such venue, hosting two first-class matches against Trinidad and Tobago and Guyana. The following season, Barbados played two one-day matches there in the 2006–07 KFC Cup. In 2014, the Sagicor High Performance Centre played a one-day match at the Oval against a touring Bangladesh A side.

As a football venue, the Oval is used by the Carlton Club's football section.

== Records ==
=== First-class ===
- Highest team total: 319 all out by Barbados v Trinidad and Tobago, 2005–06
- Lowest team total: 147 all out by Barbados v Trinidad and Tobago, as above
- Highest individual innings: 115 by Lendl Simmons for Trinidad and Tobago v Barbados, as above
- Best bowling in an innings: 5–36 by Mervyn Dillon for Trinidad and Tobago v Barbados, as above
- Best bowling in a match: 8–65 by Mervyn Dillion, as above

=== List A ===
- Highest team total: 252 for 7 (50 overs) by Guyana v Windward Islands, 2005–06
- Lowest team total: 197 all out (40.3 overs) by Windward Islands v Guyana, 2005–06
- Highest individual innings: 111 not out by Nkruma Bonner for Sagicor High Performance Centre v Bangladesh A, 2014
- Best bowling in an innings: 4–48 by Ryan Hinds for Barbados v Leeward Islands, 2006–07

== See also ==
- List of cricket grounds in the West Indies
