= Foursquare Rum Distillery =

Barbados rum distillery

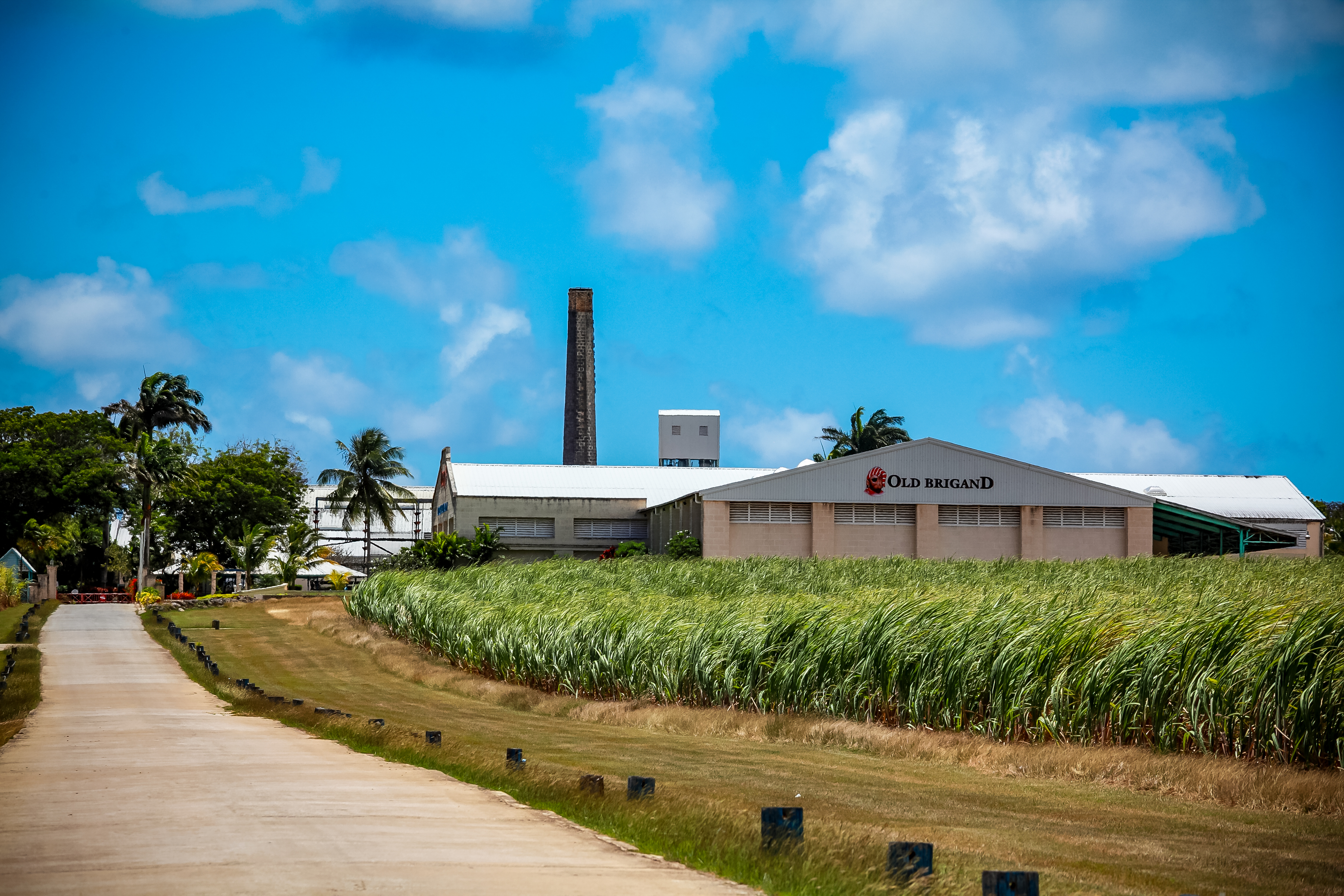
- Location: Four Roads, Saint Philip, Barbados
- Coordinates: 13.1054°N 59.4825°W
- Owner: Richard Seale
- Founded: 1995
- Founder: David Seale

The Foursquare Rum Distillery is located in Saint Philip, Barbados, and was established in 1995 by David Seale. The distillery produces its own rum brands, as well as rum for other brands. As of 2024, the distillery is run by David Seale's son, Richard Seale, a fourth-generation distiller and Barbadian rum historian. The distillery maintains centuries-old buildings and artifacts on its site, and is known for producing rum in the historic Barbadian style.

== History ==
=== Foursquare sugar plantation & factory ===
The Foursquare Sugar Plantation was a sugar plantation in the parish of Saint Philip, Barbados. Established in the 1640s, a molasses factory was built circa 1730, and the first distillery on the Foursquare site was built in 1737. The distillery was one of 168 rum distilleries on the island of Barbados in 1856, however, many of them shut down due to Barbados instituting a tax per still, and banning distilleries from selling directly, forcing them to sell to middlemen, with minimum quantities also instituted. Following the trend where many estates that produced sugar, molasses, and rum stopped producing rum, the distillery closed down in the 1800s, and the site was converted to a sugar factory in 1867. The sugar factory continued to operate until it also closed down in 1987.

=== R.L. Seale & Co. Ltd. ===
Following the ban on distilleries selling directly to consumers in the late 1800s, many merchants and blenders started blending and bottling Barbadian rum for commercial sale.

R.L. Seale & Co. Ltd. was founded in 1926 by rum merchant Reginald Leon Seale, the grandfather of David Seale. This company did not have a distillery, but rather, sourced rums from other distilleries to be blended and bottled. This was the start of the Seale's family involvement in rum manufacturing, and established their namesake brand, R.L. Seale. Over the decades, they also acquired several other brands that are kept in production by Foursquare Rum Distillery, such as Doorly's, Old Brigand, and E.S.A. Field, as well as other Barbadian products, such as John D. Taylor's Velvet Falernum. According to Gayle Seale, "most of our brands are other rum families … instead of just closing them down, we kept them all, kept their best products … it's something very important to us, we are very much about preserving the history and the legacy of all these different families".

=== The new Foursquare Rum Distillery ===
The closed Foursquare sugar factory was acquired by David Seale, who founded Foursquare Rum Distillery on the site in 1995 and began operations in 1996. In 2009, Seale donated part of the grounds to form the Foursquare Park cricket field. Much of the original buildings on the site have been restored and preserved, and now host Heritage Park, an open-air museum featuring antique rum manufacturing equipment, and the Folk Museum, which offers guests a tour of the role that rum has played in the history of Barbados.

== Production ==
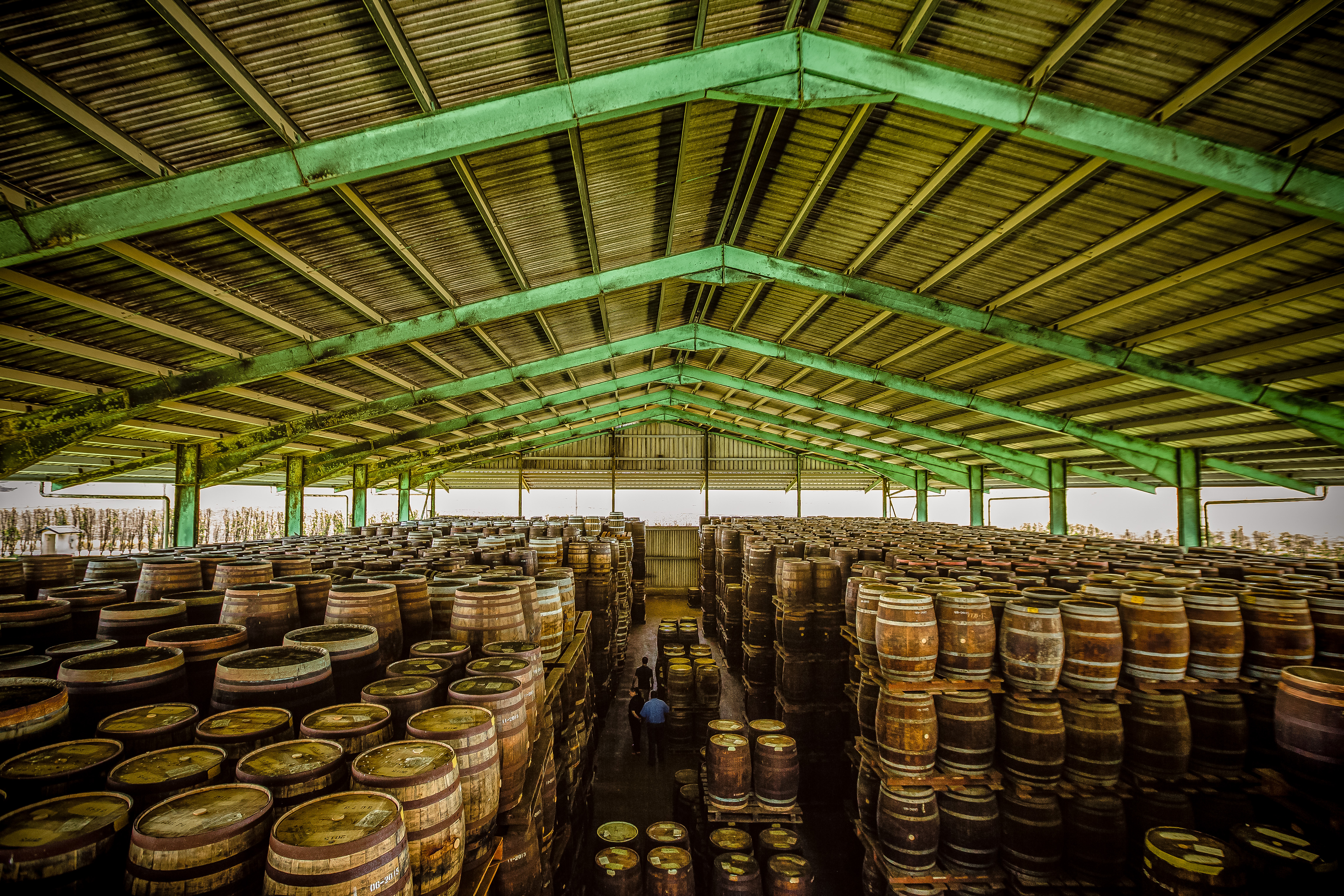
Barrels of rum maturing in a warehouse at Foursquare Rum Distillery.

Foursquare uses a combination of two double retort copper pot stills and a modern twin column Coffey vacuum still to produce its rums, blending pot- and column-distilled spirits in the Barbadian style. The distillery sources most of its molasses locally, and employs a proprietary yeast strain from South Africa for fermentation. Aging occurs mostly in ex-bourbon and Madeira barrels, with no added sugars, colorings, or flavors, reflecting Seale's advocacy for transparency and purity in rum. The distillery generates about 40% of its energy from one of Barbados' largest private solar installations, and purifies its own waste water to use as irrigation for the sugarcane fields. As of 2024, it holds over 45,000 casks in reserve, and is Barbados' largest privately-owned rum exporter.

== Products ==
Foursquare produces a range of rums under its own label and heritage brands acquired by R.L. Seale & Co. The distillery's signature series is the award-winning Exceptional Cask Selection. Other products include the Total Wine exclusive Doorly's series, and unaged white rums such as E.S.A. Field. The distillery is also the source for independent bottlers, such as The Real McCoy, and has released a collaboration blend with Hampden Estate, under the name Veritas (Probitas in the United States).

== Awards and recognition ==
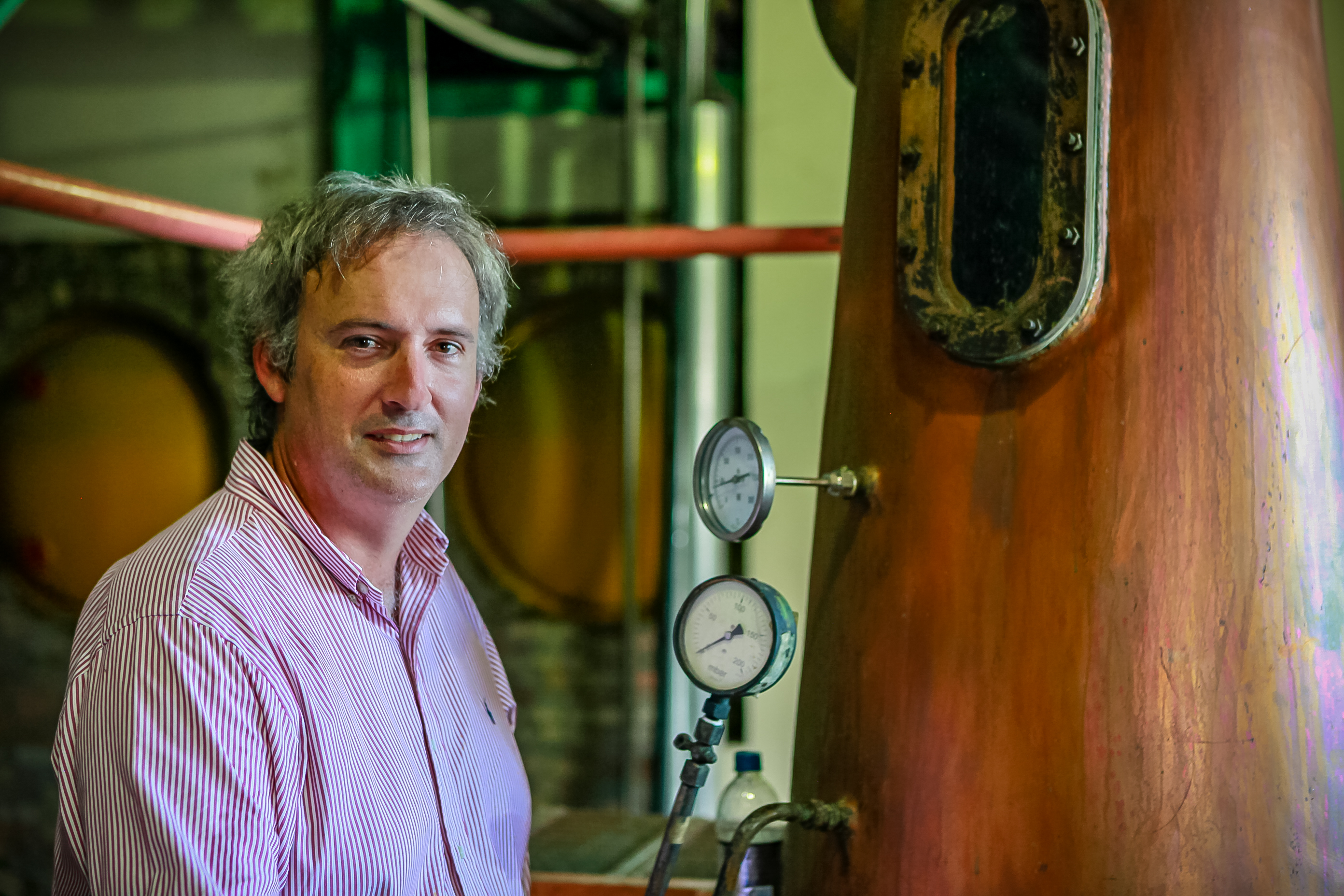
Foursquare Rum Distillery CEO Richard Seale, posing next to a still.

Foursquare has received several international awards for its rums. In 2018, its 2005 expression became the first rum to win the Supreme Champion at the International Spirits Challenge. The distillery was named Rum Producer of the Year at the International Wine & Spirit Competition in 2021, with five Gold Outstanding medals out of seven awarded globally. It won the IWSC Rum Producer Trophy again in 2024, with rums scoring up to 99 points. Richard Seale was recognized as the IWSC's Industry Champion in 2023 for his contributions to rum. Foursquare has been recognized as Rum Producer of the Year for eight consecutive years at the International Spirits Challenge.

== Advocacy for a Barbadian rum GI ==
Richard Seale is an outspoken advocate for unadulterated Barbadian rum, and has advocated against additives in rum and confronted brands for adding sugar to rum. Foursquare, along with two other major distilleries on the island, Mount Gay and St Nicholas Abbey, which make up the majority of rum aged in Barbados, make rum in a traditional Barbadian style with no added sugar and support a Barbadian geographic indication (GI). Seale stated in an interview that it would be cheaper to buy spirit from column-still rum producing countries and "slap Barbados flags all over it", and that "a GI is a step towards … allowing us to elevate Barbados." Seale has criticized shipping goods for finishing in Europe as a colonial practice that reduces economic value retained in Barbados.

== See also ==
- List of rum brands
- List of companies of Barbados
