= Steve Alleyne =

Scottish cricketer

Personal information
- Full name: Stephen Mark Clark Alleyne
- Born: 28 January 1960; Stoke Newington, London, England
- Died: 15 October 2007 (aged 47); Barbados
- Batting: Right-handed
- Bowling: Right arm medium

Domestic team information
- Years: Team
- 1985: Scotland

Career statistics
Competition	List A
Matches	1
Runs scored	4
Batting average	4.00
100s/50s	–/–
Top score	4
Catches/stumpings	–/–
- Source: , 18 October 2016

Steve Alleyne (28 January 1960 – 15 October 2007) was an English-born Barbadian cricketer, who played for Scotland in List A cricket. A graduate of Herriot-Watt University in Edinburgh, Scotland, Alleyne worked for the Scottish Life Assurance Company and was a fellow of the Faculty of Actuaries in 1987. He was a founding member of the Caribbean Actuarial Association (CAA) and served as the first Vice President, holding other Executive Council positions from 1992 to 1998. Alleyne was the president of the Barbados Cricket Association from 2000 to 2004 and led the Barbados Local Organizing Committee for the 2007 Cricket World Cup. Alleyne died of a heart attack in the morning hours of 15 October 2007.
