= Carlton Cricket Club (Barbados) =

Cricket club in Barbados

Carlton Club is a cricket club in Barbados, competing in the Barbados Cricket Association Division 1 championship. The club is based in Black Rock, north of Bridgetown and its home ground is the Desmond Haynes Oval. Carlton was founded on 1 April 1940 as a club for "lower middle income whites and near whites for whom there was no space in Pickwick and Wanderers [cricket clubs]". Changes in Barbadian society meant that from the 1960s onwards, the membership of Carlton gradually came to reflect the general Barbadian population.

A multi-sport club, Carlton also supports football, netball and volleyball teams. The club motto is Labor omnia vincit.

Notable cricketers from Carlton include:

- Tony Cozier.
- Desmond Haynes, the club president in the 2000s.
- Corey Collymore.
- Dale Richards.
