= LIME Sports Club =

Cricket club in Barbados

LIME Sports Club is a cricket club in Barbados. The club competes in the Barbados Cricket Association Division 1 competition, the premier cricket competition in Barbados. The club was established for employees of Barbados External Telecommunications (BET), later Cable & Wireless, and since 2008, LIME.

The club first competed in the Intermediate Division and after years of success was promoted to Division 1 in 1989. In its first year, BET finished 10th in the 14-team competition. In 1994, the club broke through for its first Division 1 championship in 1994 when it shared the title with Spartan.

Notable cricketers associated with LIME include former West Indies wicket-keeper Courtney Browne.
