= Banks Barbados Brewery =

Caribbean brewery founded in St. Michael, Barbados

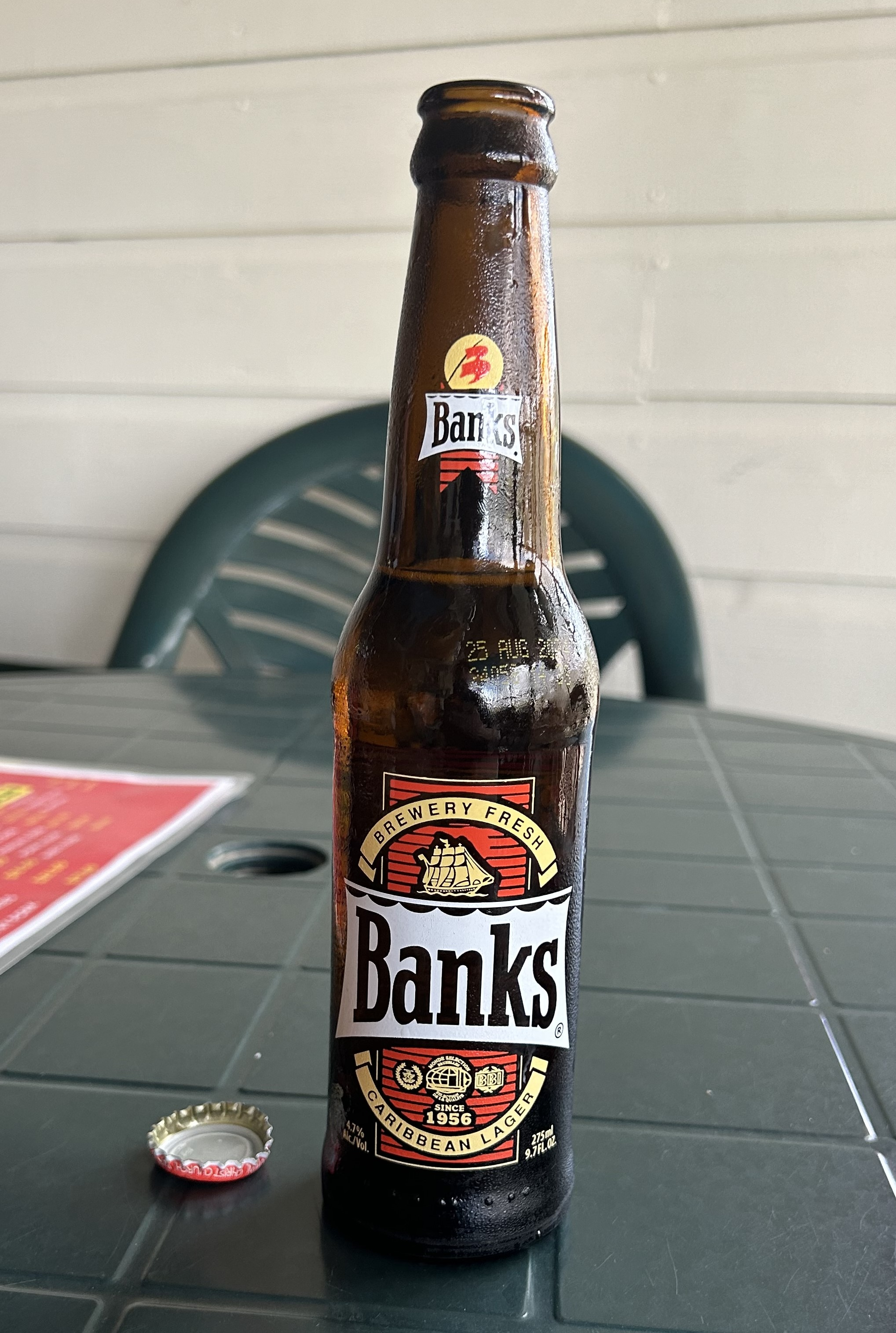
A bottle of Banks Caribbean lager

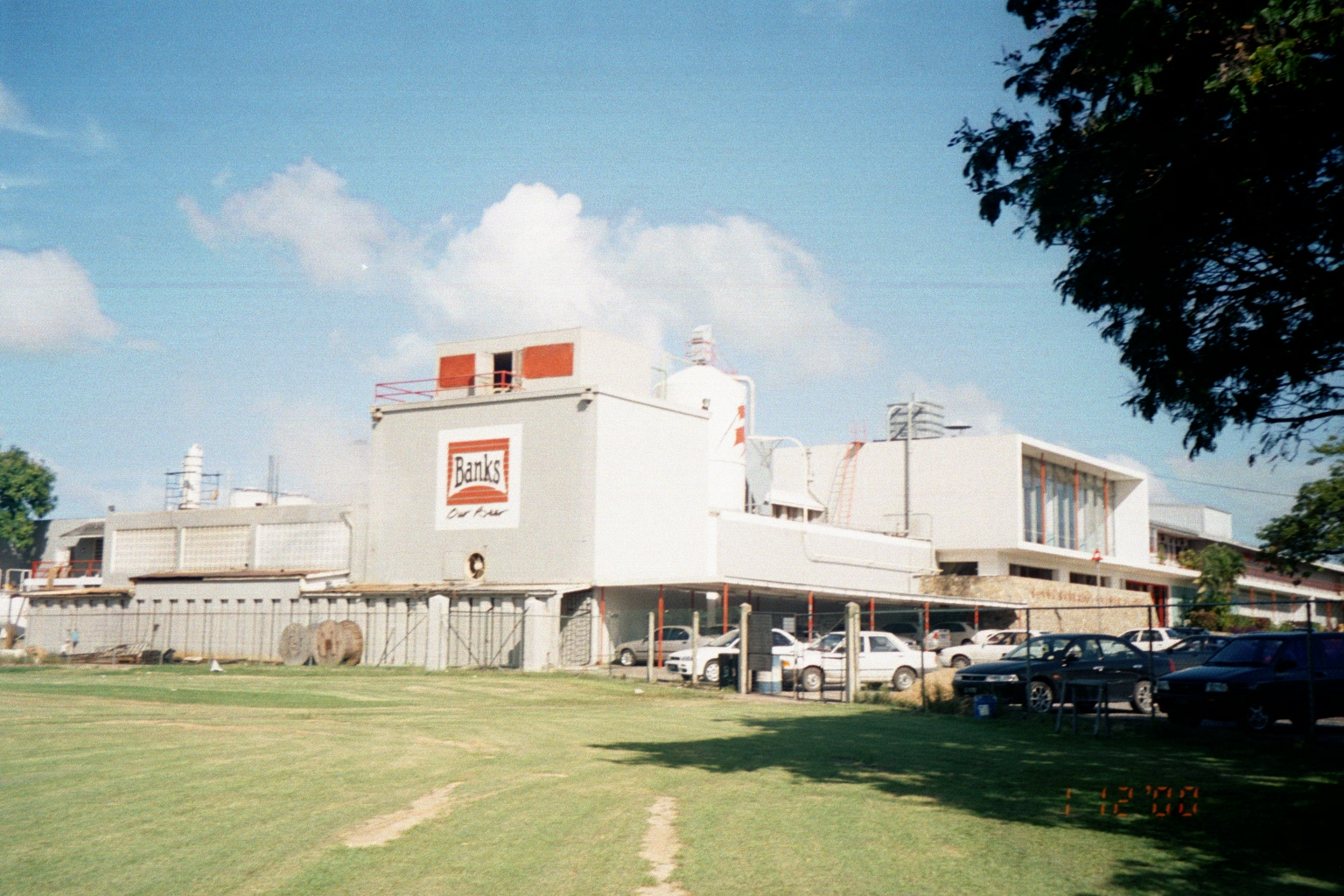
The Banks Brewery in Barbados (c.a. November 2000)

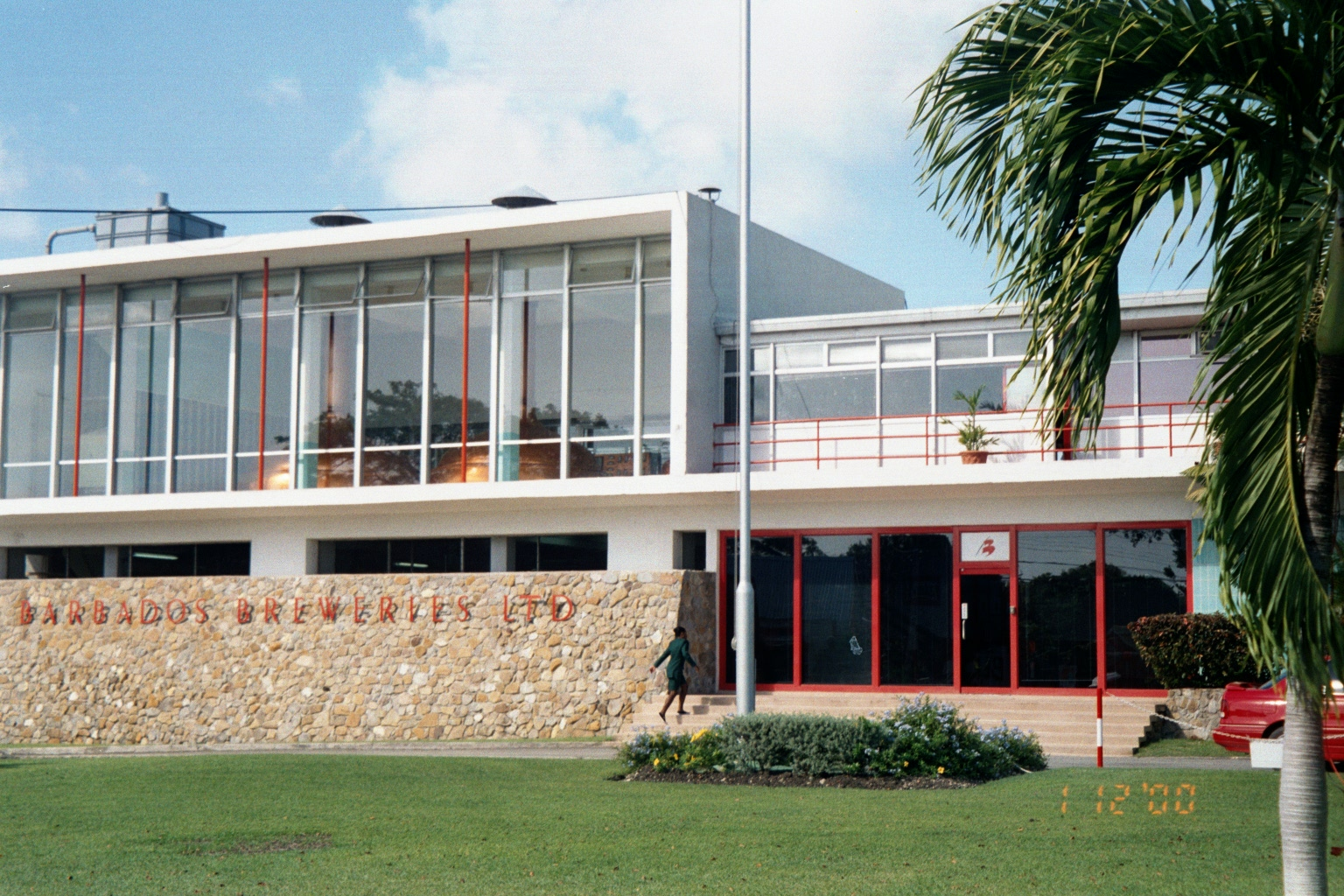
Entry to Banks Brewery in Barbados (c.a. November 2000)

Banks (Barbados) Breweries Ltd. is a Caribbean brewery founded in 1961 in St. Michael, Barbados. It is part of the Banks Holdings Limited group.

== History ==
Banks Beer was started as an idea formed by Peter D'Aguiar, a Guyanese entrepreneur. In the late 1950s the Barbados government offered tax concessions to encourage someone to start a local brewery. 30% of the required start-up funds were provided by Banks Diversified Industrial Holdings (DIH) of Guyana and the rest of the capital was collected by the sale of shares to local people in Barbados. A brewery was constructed at Wildey about 2 miles west of the centre of Bridgetown. On September 7, 1961, Banks (Barbados) Breweries opened for business.

In the beginning, the company only produced Banks Beer but by 1963 the company added two other products to its portfolio: Milk Stout and Tiger brand Malt, the latter of which can be found in the Caribbean, South America, Asia, Canada, Europe and the United States. The government soon realised that the granted concessions were losing them revenue, so withdrew them. Banks(DIH) were somewhat unhappy with this decision and sold their stake to Barbados Shipping & Trading, a local conglomerate. Unfortunately, Banks(DIH) retained the rights to the use of the name Banks except in certain islands of the Caribbean, which inhibited the local company from exporting the product. Banks first began exporting in 1968, with the first two export countries of Saint Vincent and Dominica located nearby. In 1973 the company acquired the right to use the name Banks in the whole of the anglophone Caribbean. For a while, the beer was brewed under licence in the UK by King & Barnes of Horsham, Sussex and marketed under the name "Bajan" but with a very similar style of bottle and bottle decoration. Banks Beer received its first International Award from the Lager Beer Competition in England in 1971. The company would continue to win awards through the years.

Subsequently, Banks Brewery took over the Barbados Bottling Company (BBC) a local company which packaged local soft drinks and under licence, Coca Cola. It also formed a distribution company (B&B Distribution) and this and BBC were located at Newton Terrace about 7 miles west of Bridgetown and to reflect this change, the company was renamed Banks Holdings Limited (BHL). In the late 1990s BHL bought around 95% of the shares in Pine Hill Dairy a local company producing milk and other dairy products and a range of fruit juice drinks. In 2005, the company joined forces with Banks(DIH) with the intention of exporting the brand as one company abroad, beginning with the United States.

Later, a new state of the art brewery was constructed adjacent to BBC at Newton Terrace

In 2015 after a bidding battle with Ansa McAl, a Trinidadian conglomerate and brewer of Carib beers, the company was purchased by AmBev, the South American subsidiary of InBev, the world's largest brewer.

== Availability ==
The beers are available on the island of Barbados and in many other countries in the Caribbean. The brand is also sold in the United States, Canada and Sweden. According to its website, as of 2012, Banks beer is also currently sold in the United Kingdom.

== See also ==
- Banks Sports and Cultural Club
- Barbadian companies
