= Kensington Oval =

Sports stadium in Barbados

Coordinates: 13°6′18.18″N 59°37′21.29″W

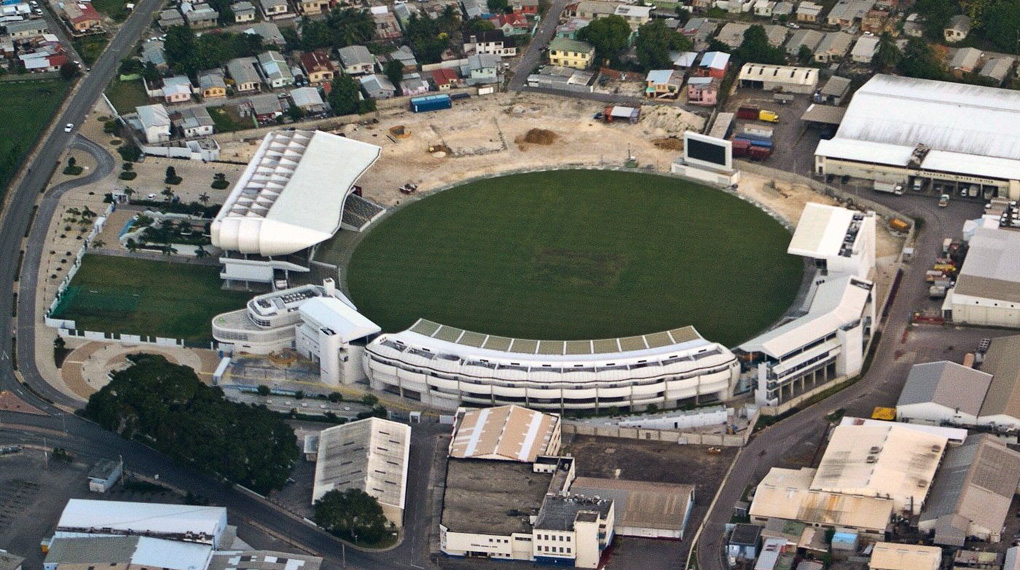
- Interactive map of Kensington Oval

Ground information
- Location: Bridgetown, Barbados
- Country: Barbados
- Establishment: 1871
- Capacity: 30,549
- Tenants: Barbados Cricket Association (BCA); Barbados Royals
- End names
- Malcolm Marshall End; Joel Garner End

International information
- First men's Test: 11–16 January 1930: West Indies v England
- Last men's Test: 25–27 June 2025: West Indies v Australia
- First men's ODI: 23 April 1985: West Indies v New Zealand
- Last men's ODI: 9 December 2023: West Indies v England
- First men's T20I: 20 June 2008: West Indies v Australia
- Last men's T20I: 29 June 2024: India v South Africa
- First women's ODI: 25 April 2012: West Indies v Sri Lanka
- Last women's ODI: 22 September 2018: West Indies v South Africa
- First women's T20I: 16 May 2010: Australia v New Zealand
- Last women's T20I: 22 December 2022: West Indies v England

Team information
Pickwick Cricket Club	(1882–2004)
Barbados Cricket Association (BCA)	(2004–present)
Barbados Tridents	(2013–present)
- As of 6 June 2024; Source: Cricinfo

The Kensington Oval is a stadium located in the western part of Bridgetown, Barbados. It is the pre-eminent sporting facility on the island and is primarily used for cricket. It has hosted many important cricket games between local, regional, and international teams during its more than 120-year history.

== History ==
Cricket at the Oval began in 1882 when the Pickwick Cricket Club assumed formal ownership of the ground. The first international match held was in 1895 when Slade Lucas' side visited the island. The first Test match was held in January 1930, when the West Indies and England played to a draw. Since the genesis there have been a total of 43 Test matches played on the Kensington Oval grounds, 21 of those matches won by the West Indian cricket team. The new stadium has been commemorated through two 2007 Barbadian postage stamps.

== Redevelopment ==
=== Structures and facilities ===
The stands of the Kensington Oval were extensively rebuilt for the 2007 Cricket World Cup in a BDS$90M (US$45 Million) redevelopment. Demolition of the old stadium began on schedule in June 2006 after completion of the first Test against Pakistan. Innotech Construction Inc. reconstructed the new Kensington Oval in late September into early October 2006 and the team from the Barbados Light & Power Company cut down and removed some of the old utility poles at the traffic lights at the Holborn Circle, the entrances and exits of Fontabelle Road, Spring Garden Highway, Prescod Boulevard and Harbour Road and they planted new utility poles with electrical transmitters attached on to them. They also dug up, resurfaced and repaved Prescod Boulevard and Fontabelle Road just in time for Cricket World Cup 2007 in Barbados. The names of the former stands which made up the Kensington stadium were the George Challenor stand, the Hall and Griffith, the Kensington, the Mitchie Hewitt, the Pickwick, and the Three Ws stand plus the Peter Short Media Centre. Most of these names have been retained.

The redevelopment of the Oval was spearheaded by Dipesh Patel from Arup Associates in the United Kingdom. The Oval’s design was part of the portfolio that earned Arup Associates the Building Design 2007 Architect of the Year Award in the Leisure/Sport category. Local contractors, including Larsen & Toubro, worked over 20 months to complete the project at a cost of $135 million.

=== Outfield ===
In 2004, the STRI construction team were chosen to redevelop the Kensington Oval outfield, after they were previously involved with the Lord's Cricket Ground outfield reconstruction. The topsoil on the ground's previous outfield was a sandy clay loam, which struggled to cope with Bridgetown's occasional heavy rainfall, with climate data indicating that a storm lasting up to an hour could dump about 50mm of rain once every five years. The topsoil was a complete mixture of soils and significantly varied in depth, lying over ancient coral reef limestone.

The new outfield consists of 175 mm of amended root-zone, 125 mm of unamended root-zone sand, a 50 mm blinding layer, and a 100 mm gravel drainage layer. Although many types of grass options was suggested to be used for the outfield, it was decided to use Tifway 419 hybrid Bermuda grass as this type of grass is highly disease resistant, dense and spreads quickly to ensure quick recovery from injury and allows close mowing. The pitch square was reconstructed with four main individual pitches and a profile consisting of 200 mm of clay over 150 mm of medium-fine sand along with a gravel drainage layer. The square's soil is made up of 71% clay, 14% silt, and 14% sand; during the redevelopment, it was isolated from the rest of the ground so that it could be constructed before the outfield was completed. The pitch square was sown down with Princess Bermuda grass, with the base and soil added in layers, before completion in May 2006.

== Events ==
The Kensington Oval has also hosted many non-cricket events, such as matches of the Barbados national football team, hockey, inter-school athletics, Miss Barbados pageants, and concert events. The ground also has a jumbo TV screen and also a jacuzzi type area, for fans to watch while relaxing in the pool (similar to Chase Field in Phoenix, Arizona). Behind this is a large grassy hill for fans to have picnics on, which has a bunker underneath for the media.

On 5 August 2011 Rihanna performed at the Kensington Oval for the first time in her home country on her Loud Tour. She planned another show for 1 November 2013 as a part her Diamonds World Tour, however the concert was cancelled due to technical difficulties.

The ground was selected to host all eight matches of the 2026 Women's Caribbean Premier League, marking the first time the venue hosted the tournament as a standalone event.

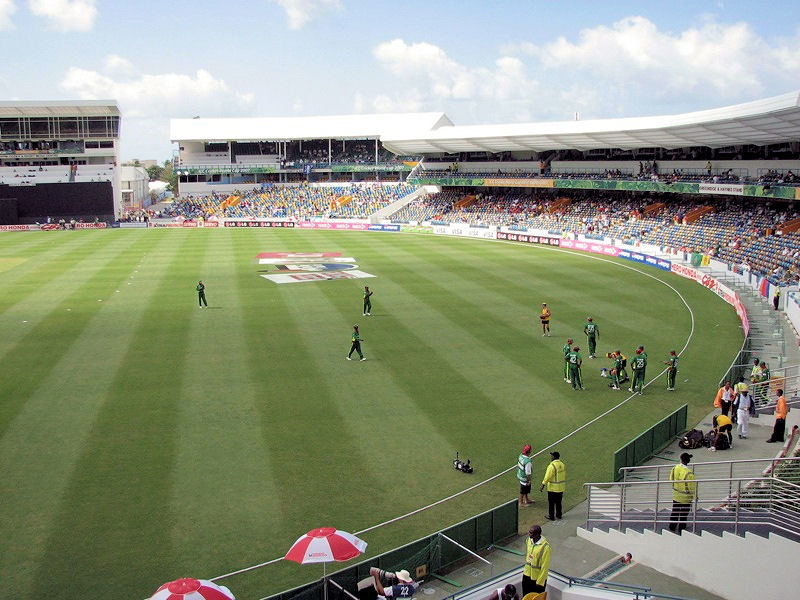
The stadium during the 2007 Cricket World Cup

=== 2007 Cricket World Cup Final ===
28 April 2007
11:30
Scorecard

Australia; 281/4 (38 overs)	v	Sri Lanka; 215/8 (36 overs)
Adam Gilchrist 149 (104); Lasith Malinga 2/49 (8 overs)		Sanath Jayasuriya 63 (67); Michael Clarke 2/33 (5 overs)

Australia won by 53 runs (D/L)
Kensington Oval, Bridgetown, Barbados
Attendance: 20,108
Umpires: Steve Bucknor (WI) and Aleem Dar (Pak)
Player of the match: Adam Gilchrist (Aus)

- Australia won the toss and elected to bat.
- Rain before play reduced the game to 38 overs per side. Sri Lanka's innings was interrupted by rain and reduced to 36 overs.

The expanded Kensington Oval was the venue for the 2007 Cricket World Cup final between Australia and Sri Lanka, held on 28 April, with the official attendance reaching 20,108. This was the first World Cup final to be a repeat – the sides previously met in the 1996 World Cup final, which Sri Lanka won. Australia has won every World Cup match against Sri Lanka apart from that loss. The match was Sri Lanka's second World Cup final appearance and Australia's sixth, their fourth in a row.

Ricky Ponting won the toss and elected to bat. However, the start of play was delayed due to rain, and the match was reduced to 38 overs per side. Adam Gilchrist played an incredible innings of 149 – the highest for any batsman in a World Cup final – to give Australia an imposing total going in at to break. While Sri Lankan batsmen Kumar Sangakkara and Sanath Jayasuriya were adding 116 for the second wicket, the contest was alive, but after the pair got out, Sri Lanka's chances slowly washed way. Further rain forced the reduction of Sri Lanka's innings to just 36 overs, with the target revised to 269. At the culmination of the 33rd over, with Sri Lanka still trailing the adjusted Duckworth-Lewis target by 37 runs, the umpires suspended the game due to bad light. While Australia's players began to celebrate their victory (since the minimum 20 overs had been reached), the umpires incorrectly announced that because the match was suspended due to light and not rain, the final three overs would have to be bowled the following day. With Sri Lanka needing 61 runs from 18 deliveries, Mahela Jayawardene agreed there was no need to return the following day, and instructed his team to resume batting, with Ricky Ponting agreeing to play only spinners. Umpires later apologized for their error, and that the match should have ended then with Australia winning by 37 runs. The last three overs were played in almost complete darkness, during which Sri Lanka added nine runs, giving Australia a 53-run victory via the DL method, as Sri Lanka had batted 2 overs fewer than Australia.

=== 2010 ICC World Twenty20 Final ===
The Final was held in Barbados on 16 May 2010. The match was won by Collingwood's England, delivering the team its first ever victory in a worldwide limited overs tournament, and its first International Cricket Council trophy. Australia batted first and scored 147 runs for the loss of six wickets. England bettered Australia's total with 18 balls to spare. Craig Kieswetter was England's top scorer with 63 runs from 49 balls while Kevin Pietersen scored 47 from 31. David Hussey of Australia scored 59. Pietersen was subsequently named Man of the Tournament having scored 248 runs, while Kieswetter was Man of the Match.

16 May 2010
11:30
Scorecard

Australia; 147/6 (20 overs)	v	England; 148/3 (17 overs)
David Hussey 59 (54); Ryan Sidebottom 2/26 (4 overs)		Craig Kieswetter 63 (49); Steve Smith 1/21 (3 overs)

England won by 7 wickets
Kensington Oval, Bridgetown, Barbados
Umpires: Aleem Dar (Pak) and Billy Doctrove (WI)
Player of the match: Craig Kieswetter (Eng)

- England won the toss and elected to field.

=== 2024 ICC Men's T20 World Cup Final ===
The Final was played in Barbados on 29 June 2024. India defeated South Africa by 7 runs to win their second T20 World Cup title. Virat Kohli was named Player of the Match for scoring 76 runs off 59 balls, while Jasprit Bumrah won Player of the Tournament for taking a tournament-high 15 wickets. The final was also the last T20I match played by Kohli, Indian captain Rohit Sharma, and Ravindra Jadeja.

29 June 2024
10:30 UTC−4
Scorecard

India; 176/7 (20 overs)	v	South Africa; 169/8 (20 overs)
Virat Kohli 76 (59); Keshav Maharaj 2/23 (3 overs)		Heinrich Klaasen 52 (27); Hardik Pandya 3/20 (3 overs)

India won by 7 runs
Kensington Oval, Bridgetown, Barbados
Umpires: Chris Gaffaney (NZ) and Richard Illingworth (Eng)
Player of the match: Virat Kohli (Ind)

- India won the toss and elected to bat.

== Awards ==
In 2008 the Institution of Structural Engineers recognised the Kensington Oval as one of its Structural Awards winners; this was under the section of "Awards for Sports or Leisure Structures". In summing up the stadium the ISE stated: "…This inspiring structure, created with meticulous attention to buildability, has added an outstanding addition to the Barbados skyline. It is already immensely popular with the most enthusiastic cricket audience in the world…"

== Gallery ==
=== New stadium ===
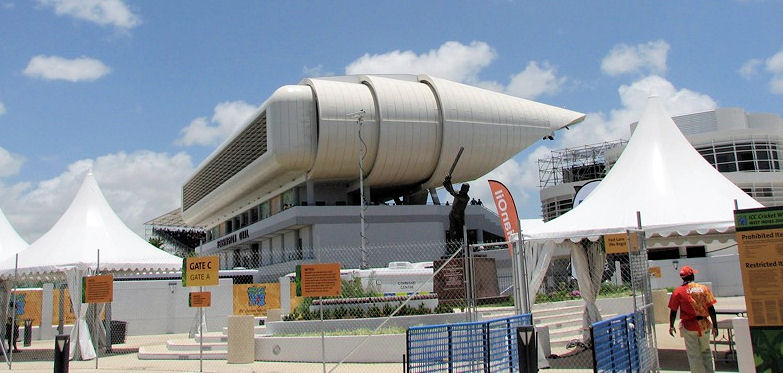
Worrell, Weekes and Walcott (or 3Ws) Stand

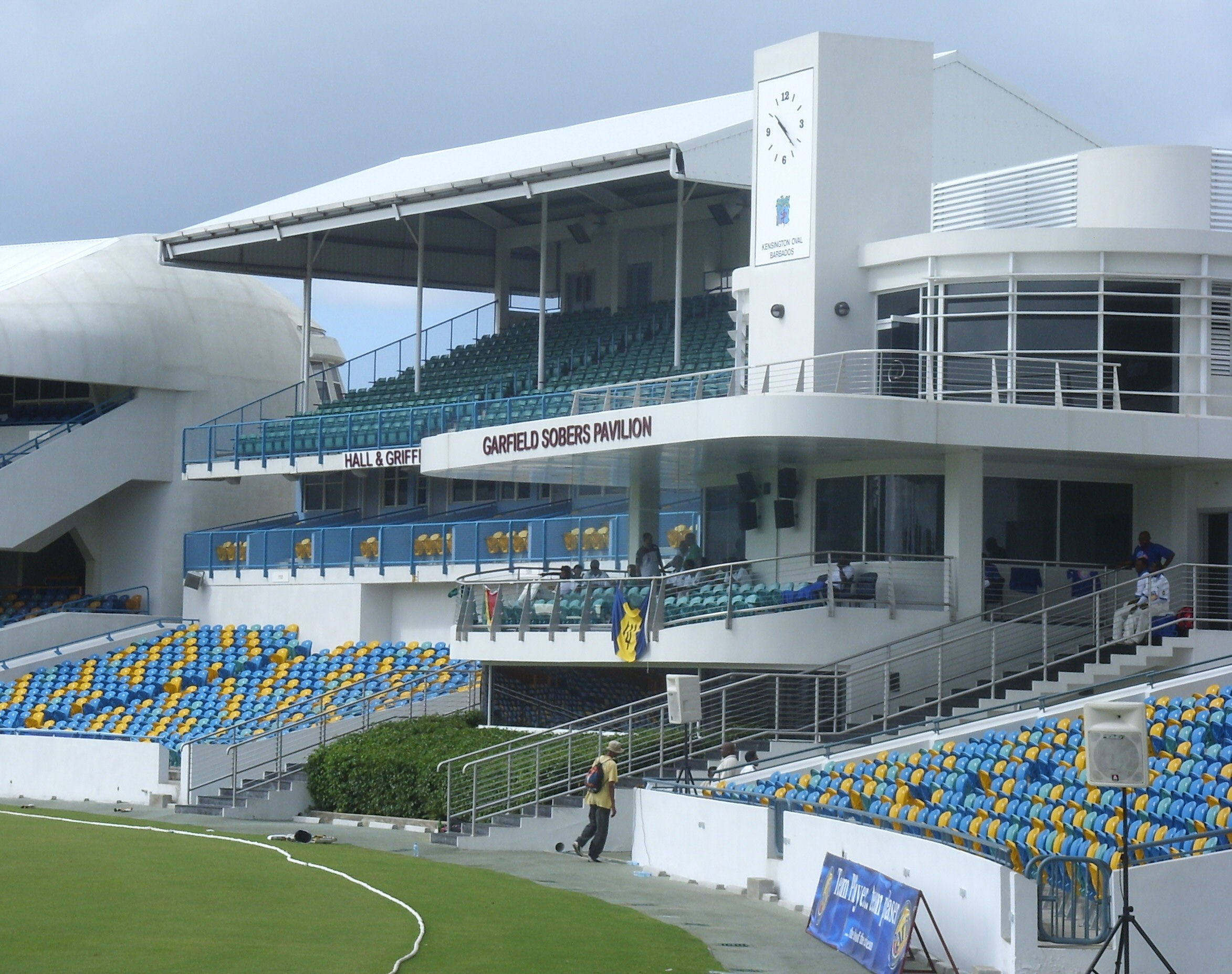
The pavilion named after Sir Garfield Sobers

=== Pre-2007 stadium ===
These are historic stands as they looked in 2000. These former stands were demolished to make way for the new stadium.

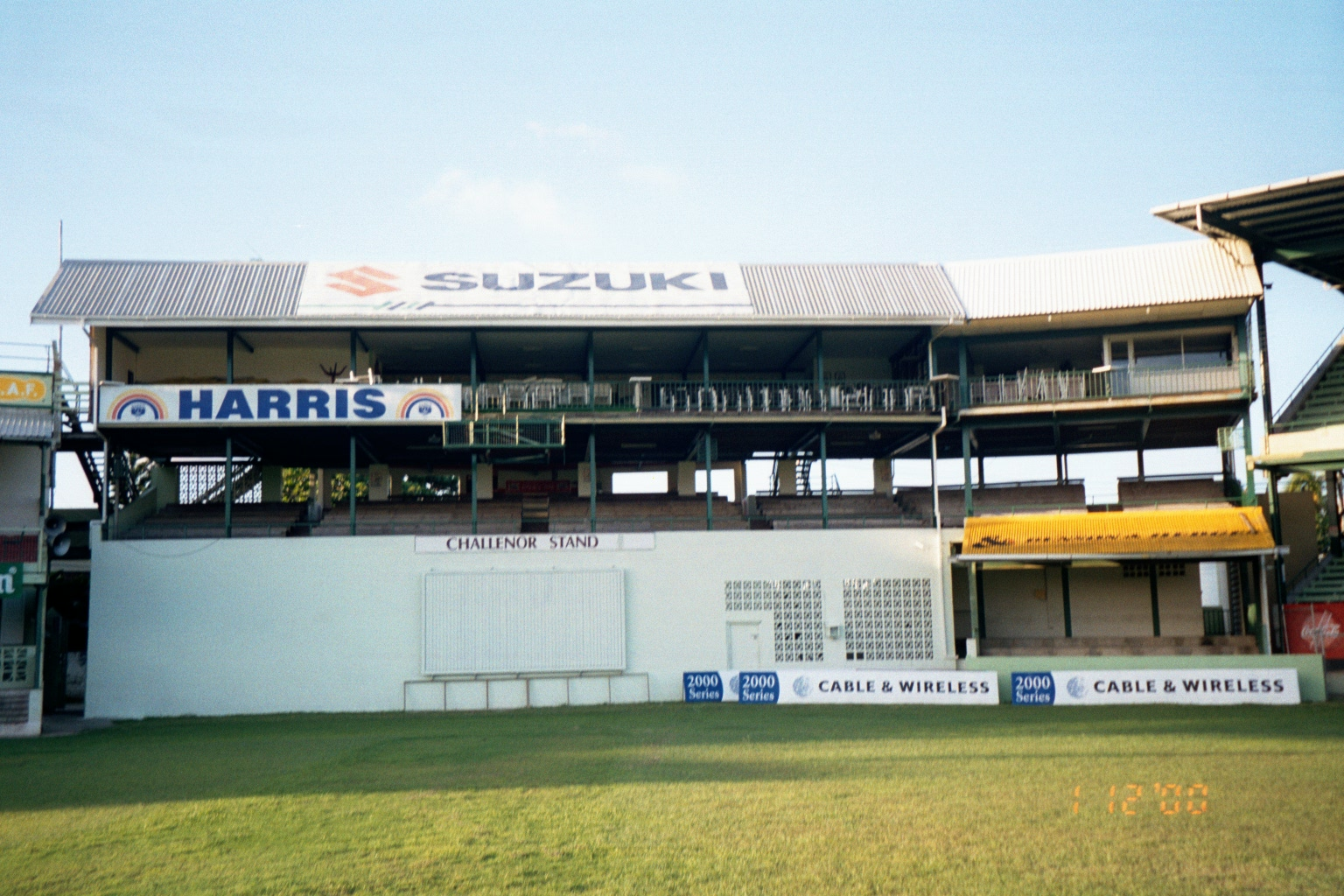
Fmr. Challenor stand

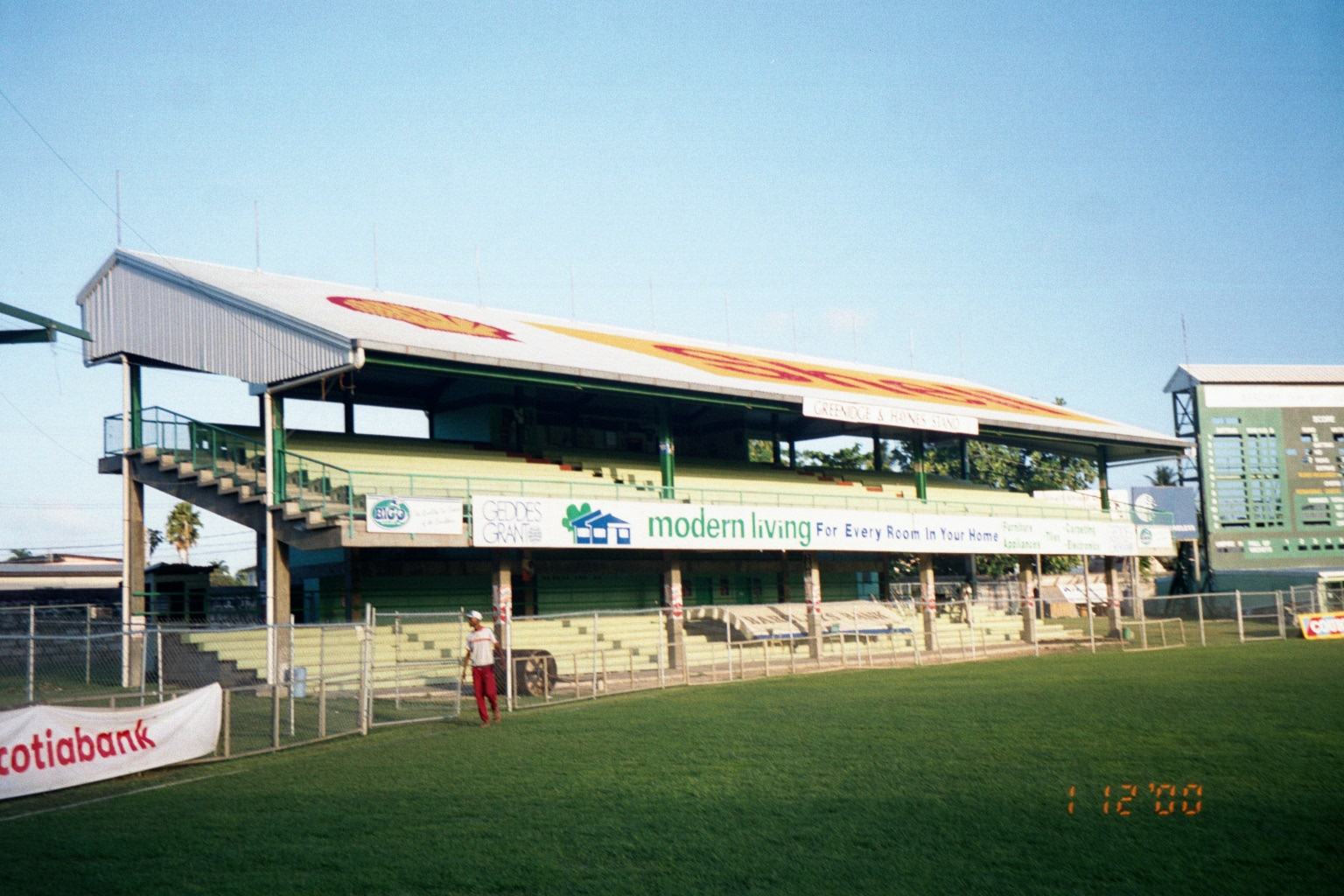
Fmr. Greenidge and Haynes stands

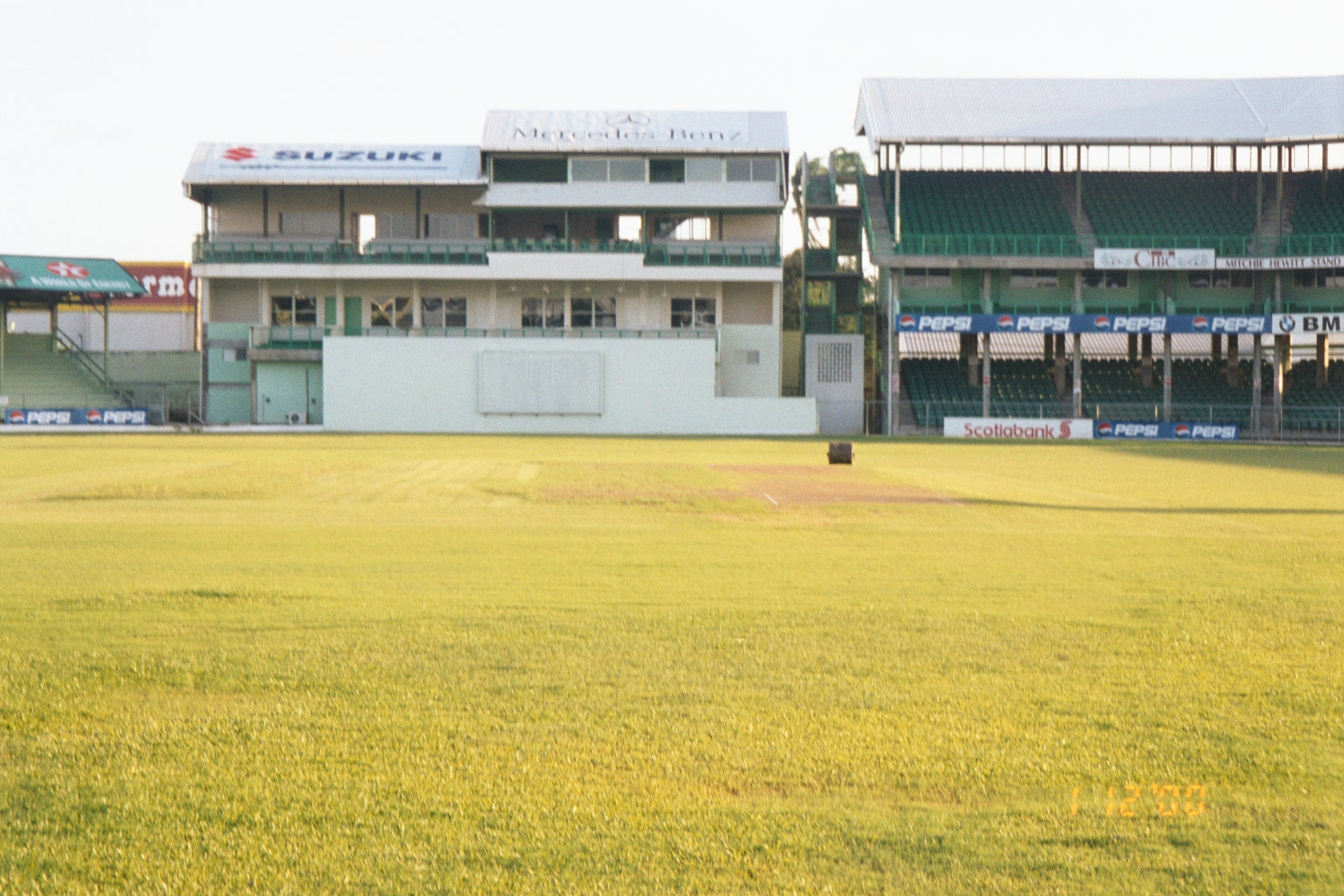
Fmr. Peter Short Media Centre and Mitchie Hewitt (half)

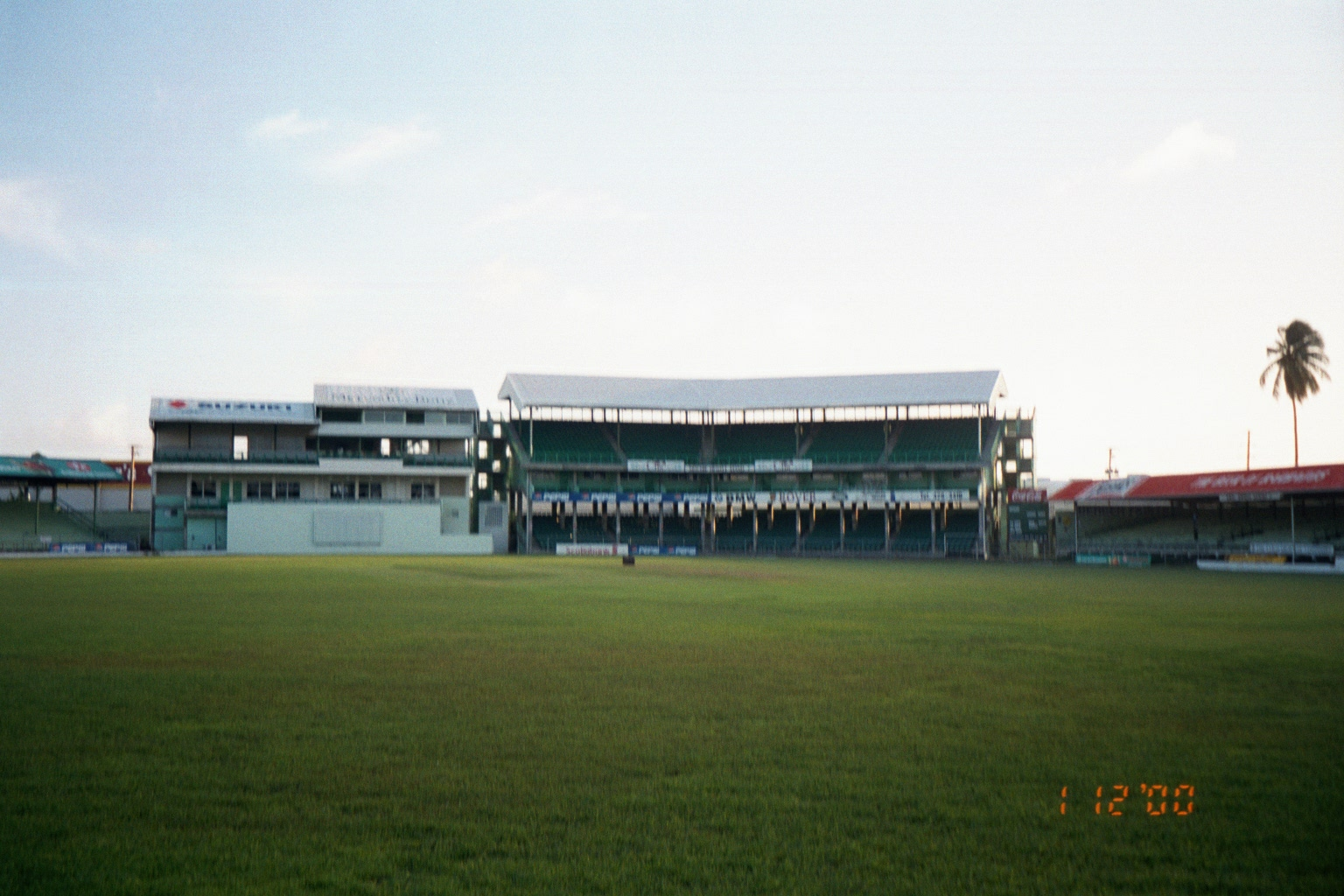
Fmr. Peter Short Media Centre and Mitchie Hewitt (Entire)

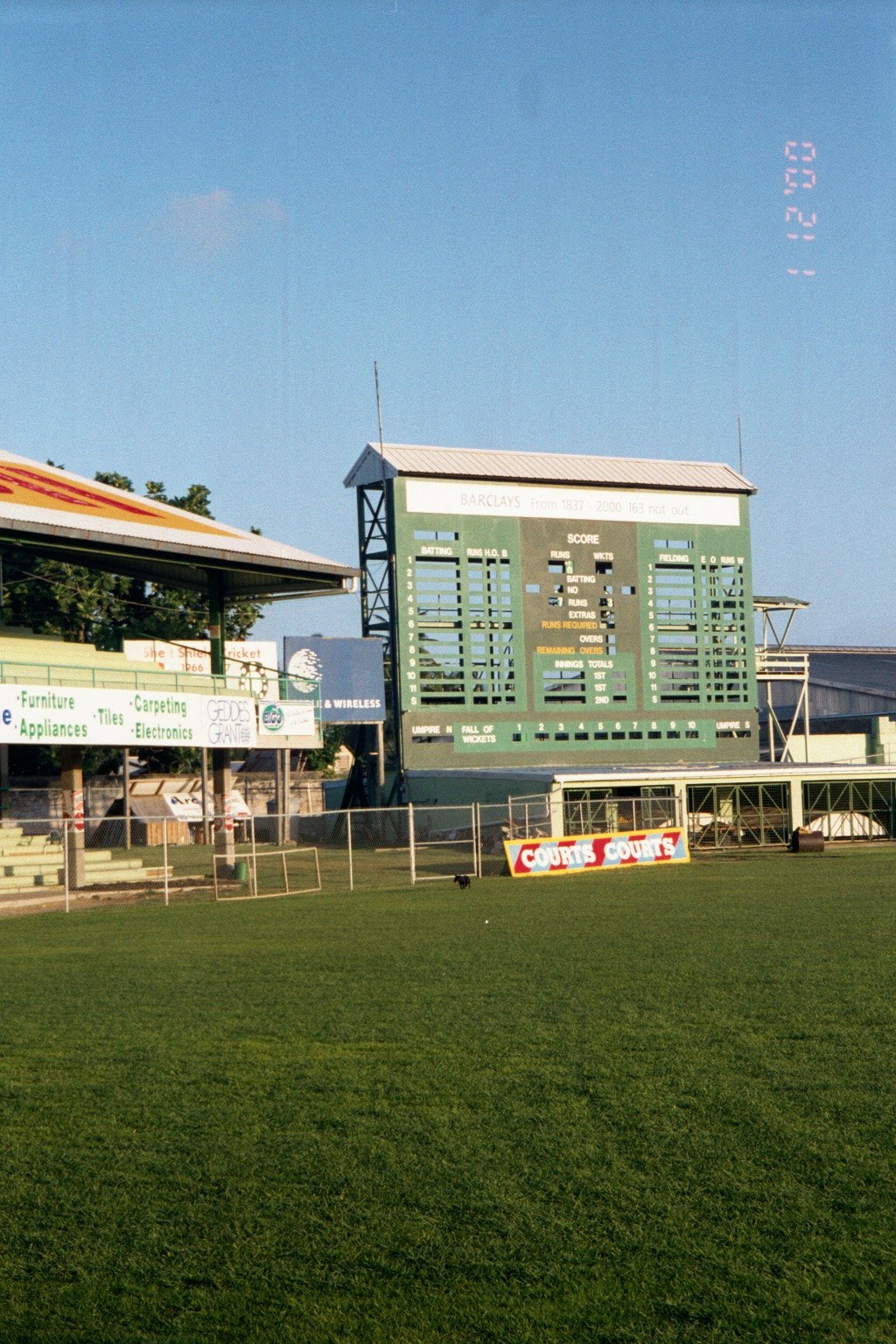
Fmr. scoreboard

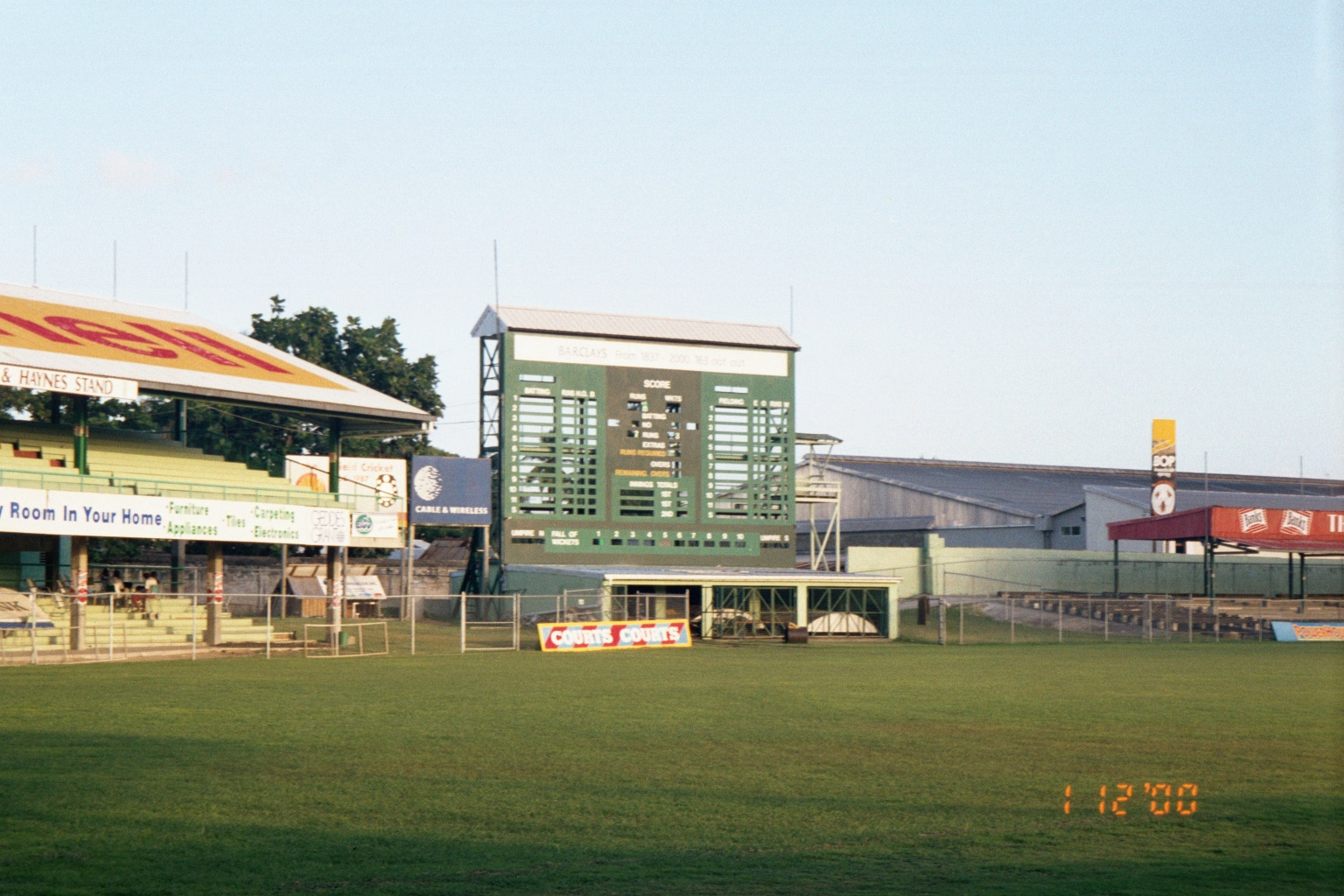
Fmr. scoreboard

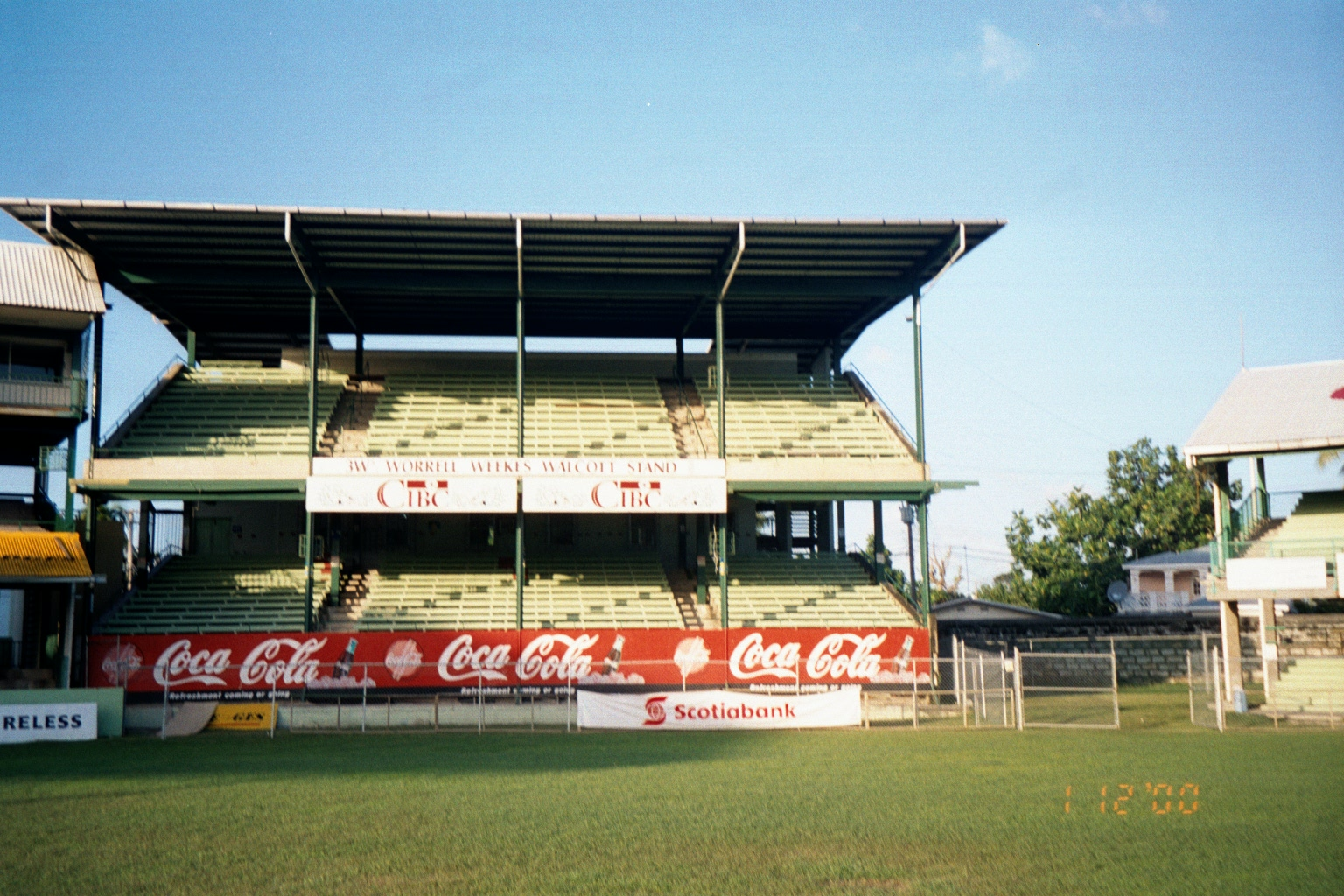
Fmr. Worrell, Weekes, and Walcott – The 3Ws

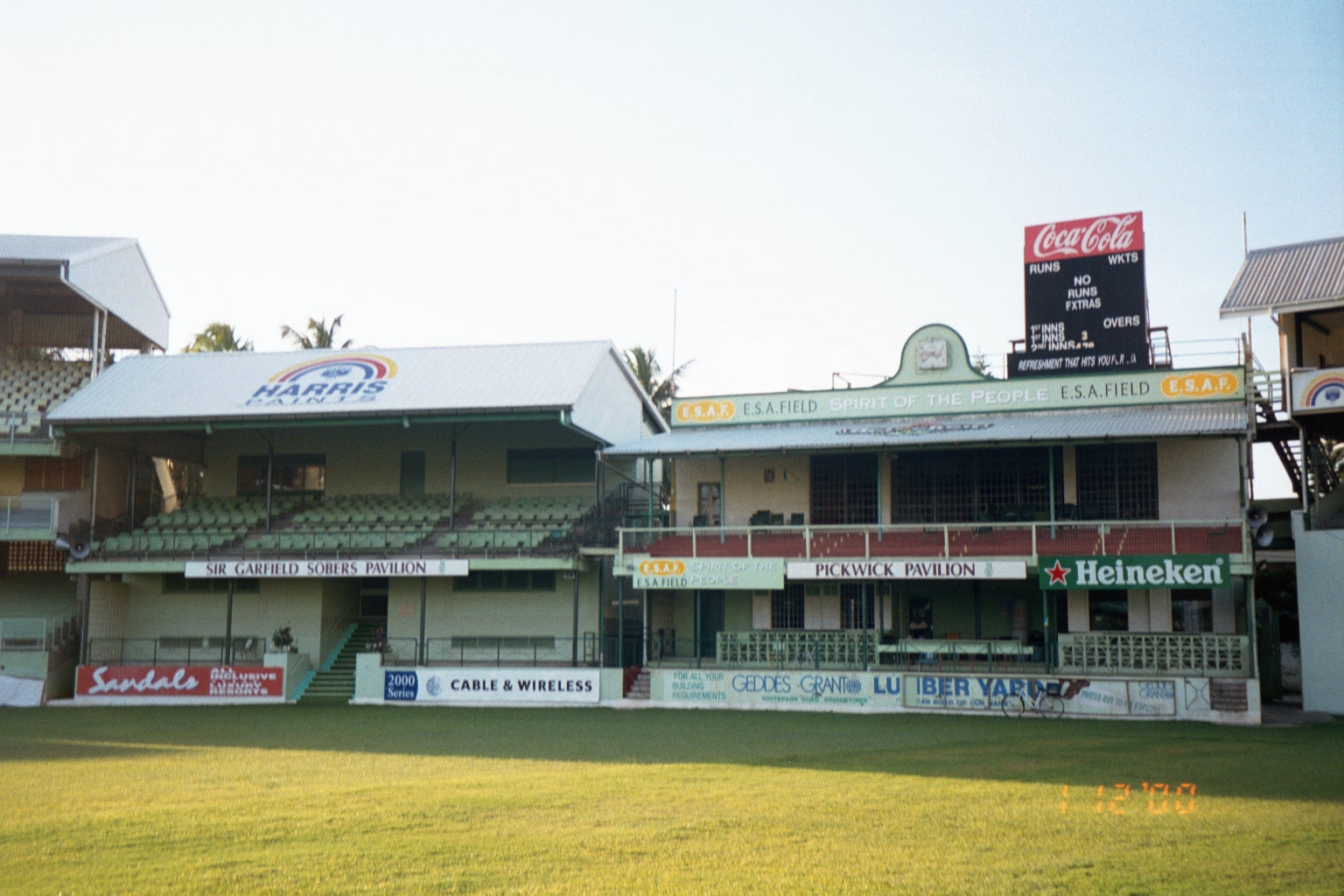
Fmr. Sir Garfield Sobers Pavilion and Pickwick Pavilion stands

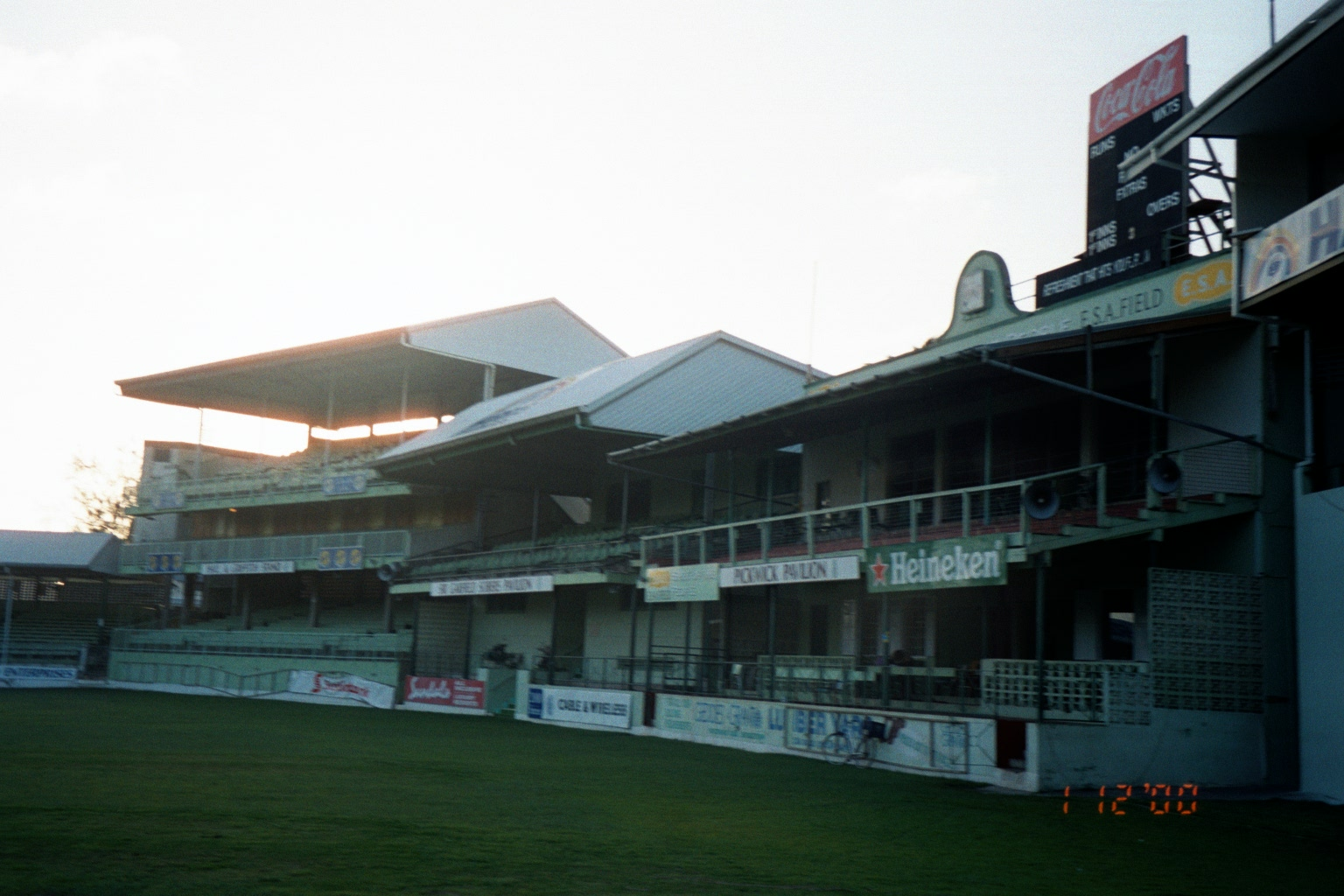
Fmr. Hall & Griffith, Sir Garfield Sobers Pavilion, and Pickwick Pavilion stands

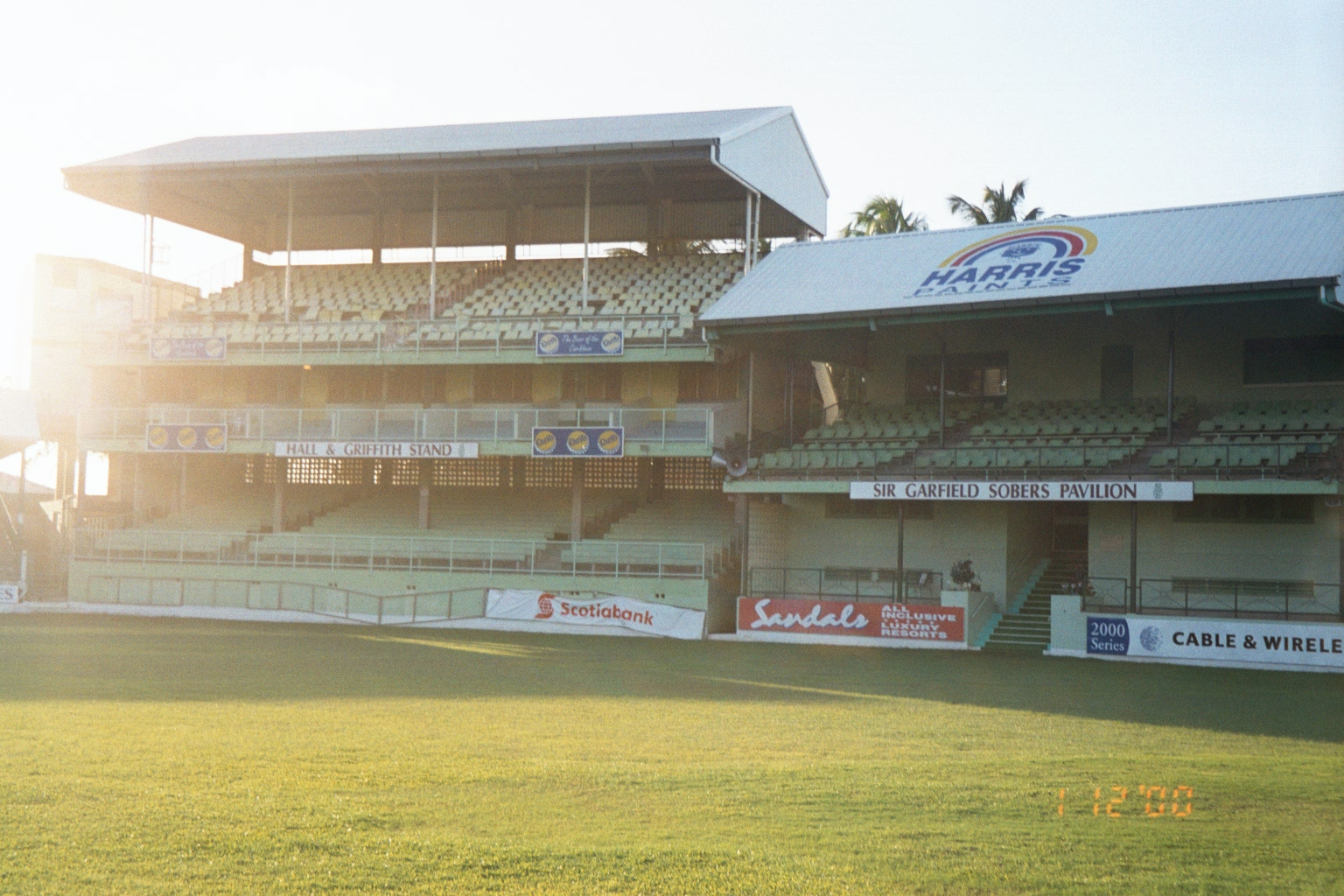
Fmr. Hall & Griffith and Sir Garfield Sobers Pavilion stands

== See also ==
- List of Test cricket grounds

== Notes ==
Events and tenants
Preceded by Wanderers Stadium	Cricket World Cup; Final Venue; 2007	Succeeded by Wankhede Stadium
