= Pickwick Cricket Club =

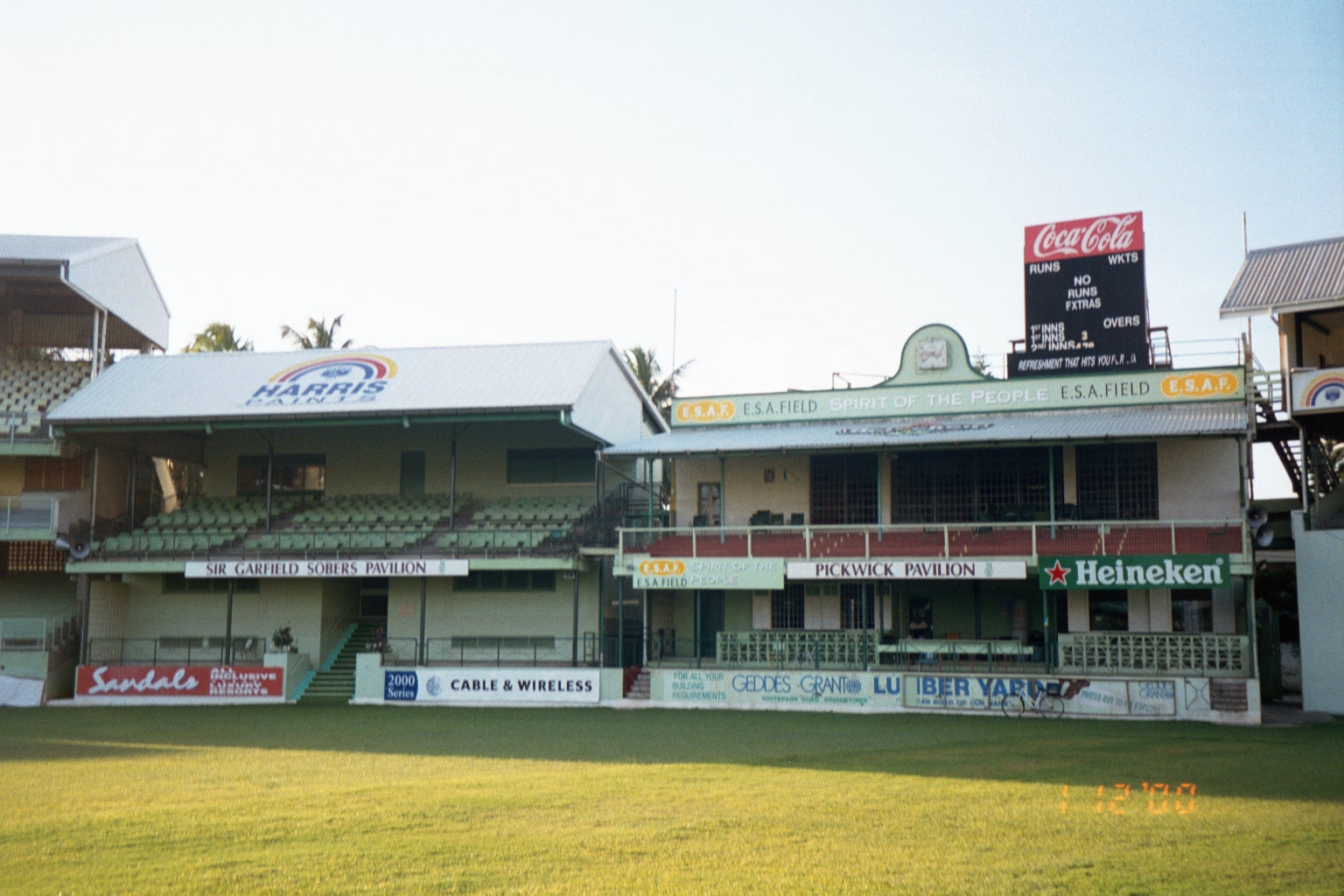
The former Pickwick Pavilion at Kensington Oval. This was home to Pickwick Cricket Club until 2005.

Pickwick Cricket Club is a Barbados cricket club. The club was founded on 23 November 1882, the second oldest cricket club in Barbados after Wanderers Cricket Club. The club's home from its foundation until 2005 was Kensington Oval in Bridgetown, the main venue for matches involving the Barbados national cricket team and the Barbados venue for Test cricket involving the West Indies cricket team. The ground was built on land on Kensington Plantation leased by the club for a penny per annum. Pickwick club developed Kensington Oval into the finest ground in Barbados and it soon replaced the Wanderers Ground and the Garrison Savannah as the venue for inter-colonial matches.

As a result of the upgrading of Kensington Oval for the 2007 Cricket World Cup, in 2009 Pickwick developed a new home ground—Foursquare Park—in Saint Philip, on land donated by Sir David Seale, the owner of the Foursquare rum distillery.

While cricket is the major sport played by the club, Pickwick once fielded a football team as well as strong men's and women's hockey teams. Notable cricketers from Pickwick CC include two West Indies captains—Teddy Hoad and John Goddard. In more recent times the club has also produced Vasbert Drakes.

In 2005, Pickwick won the Barbados Cricket Association Division One Championship—their first victory in the competition since 1958.
