= Wanderers Cricket Club =

- Sports: Cricket
- Founded: 1877
- League: Barbados Cricket Association Elite, Intermediate, 2nd Division
- Home ground: Wanderers Ground
- Colours: Maroon, Gold
- President: Prof Edwards
- Website: http://www.wandererscc.com

Wanderers Cricket Club is a Barbadian cricket club. The club plays in the Barbados Cricket Association Elite Division, the highest division of domestic cricket in Barbados. A multi-sport club, Wanderers also possesses a masters football team and a hockey team.

== Club history ==
Wanderers is the oldest existing cricket club in Barbados. The club was founded in 1877 with its initial membership drawn from the social elite of the colony, and exclusively white. The club had a strong rivalry with Pickwick Cricket Club, another white club, but one which drew its membership from a slightly lower social class. Changes in Barbadian society meant that from the 1960s onwards, the membership of Wanderers gradually came to reflect the general Barbadian population.

== Location ==
The club originally played at the Bay Pasture until moving to Dayrells Road, Christ Church, Barbados in 1952.

== Players ==
Some notable international cricketers from Wanderers include:

- (Cricket West Indies) H.G.B. Austin, the club president in the early 1900s
- (Cricket West Indies) George Challenor
- (Cricket West Indies) Denis Atkinson
- (Cricket West Indies) Eric Atkinson
- (Cricket West Indies) Robin Bynoe
- (Cricket West Indies) David Allan
- (Cricket West Indies) Prof Edwards
- (Cricket West Indies) Keith Boyce
- (Cricket West Indies) Pedro Collins
- (Cricket West Indies) Hendy Bryan
- (Cricket West Indies) Ian Bradshaw
- (Cricket West Indies) Kraigg Brathwaite
- (Cricket West Indies) Kirk Edwards
- (Cricket West Indies) Jason Holder
- (England) Chris Jordan (cricketer)
- (Cricket West Indies) Roy Marshall
