= 2005–06 West Indian cricket season =

The 2005–06 West Indian cricket season includes all domestic cricket matches played by senior teams with first-class status in the West Indies between October 2005 and March 2006, and also the international feats of the West Indies team, who is not scheduled to play any home games during this period but are to play home matches during April, May and June 2006. The season began on 2005-10-03 with the first matches of the one-day KFC Cup and is scheduled to last until 2006-03-19 when England A depart after their tour which will include one-day and first-class matches against the West Indies A team. The West Indies will not play any home Tests during their home season, but they have toured Australia (losing the 3-Test series 0–3), and toured New Zealand in February and March, immediately after the conclusion of the 2005-06 Carib Beer Cup, the first-class competition.

In domestic cricket, Guyana won the KFC Cup on home soil after going unbeaten through the group stage, though the final result was determined on the Duckworth-Lewis method. The Carib Beer Series began on 25 November with a replay of the KFC Cup final between Guyana and Barbados. The first four matches all ended in draws, and rain caused one round to be delayed until February – which also delayed the Carib Beer Challenge part of the competition until April. Trinidad and Tobago were the first teams to record a win, beating Jamaica in January, but successive wins from Barbados put them twelve points ahead of second-placed Trinidad and Tobago with the game against T&T left. However, Trinidad and Tobago won by 264 runs, drawing level with Barbados in the table but winning on the head-to-head result.

== Domestic competition tables ==
Carib Beer Cup – Final Table
Pos	Team	Pld	W	L	D	A	FI	Pts
1	Trinidad and Tobago	5	2	1	2	0	6	36
2	Barbados	5	2	1	2	0	6	36
3	Guyana	5	1	0	4	0	6	30
4	Windward Islands	5	1	0	3	1	0	25
5	Leeward Islands	5	0	1	3	1	0	13
6	Jamaica	5	0	3	2	0	6	12

For an explanation of the points system, please see the Carib Beer Cup#Current structure.

Legend:

- W: Won
- L: Lost
- D: Drawn
- A: Abandoned
- FI: First-innings points

KFC Cup League Stage – Final Table
Pos	Team	Pld	W	T	L	BP	Pts	NRR
1	Guyana	5	4	1	0	2	20	+0.51
2	Barbados	5	3	0	2	0	12	+0.12
3	Windward Islands	5	3	0	2	0	12	+0.03
4	Leeward Islands	5	2	1	2	1	11	+0.18
5	Jamaica	5	2	0	3	1	9	-0.31
6	Trinidad and Tobago	5	0	0	5	0	0	-0.68

For an explanation of the points system, please see KFC Cup#Current structure.

Legend:

- W: Won
- T: Tied
- L: Lost
- BP: Bonus points
In the tables above, the green colour indicates that a team has qualified for the second stage of the competition.

== Roll of honour ==
Test series:

- Frank Worrell Trophy: West Indies lost the 3-Test series to Australia 0–3
- New Zealand tour: West Indies lost the 3-Test series 0–2

One-day International series:

- New Zealand tour: West Indies lost the 5-match series 1–4

Twenty20 International:

- New Zealand tour: West Indies lost the Twenty20 match after bowl-out

A tour:

- England A in West Indies: West Indies A won the first-class match series 1–0 (two matches) and the one-day series 3–2 (five matches).

KFC Cup:

- Guyana beat Barbados in the final and won the KFC Cup

Carib Beer Series:

- Carib Beer Cup: Trinidad and Tobago
- Carib Beer Challenge: Trinidad and Tobago

== KFC Cup ==
=== League stage ===
==== Matchday One, 3 October ====
Before the tournament began in Barbados, the Guyana Chronicle claimed that "no team...[had] distinguished itself as an odds-on favourite in the competition." The tournament did not have a brand name sponsor until 5 October, when KFC agreed to a deal worth 3,000,000 US dollars, and the opening round was played with the tournament still named the President's Trophy. Guyana recorded an opening win over Barbados, gaining a three-run win on the Duckworth-Lewis method, after West Indies Test batsman Ramnaresh Sarwan hit 106 not out before bad light stopped play with Guyana two ahead of their target score of 204, with their opponents Barbados making 244. The Windward Islands defeated reigning champions Trinidad and Tobago, in a victory described as "remarkable" by the Guyana Chronicle, with captain Rawl Lewis scoring 30 and taking three for 32 to become Man of the Match as Trinidad and Tobago fell from 56 for 0 to 176 all out chasing a total of 190. The Leeward Islands went top, however, after bowling Jamaica out for 145 before Runako Morton put on 133 with Junie Mitchum in a nine-wicket win that gave the Leewards a bonus point.

- Guyana (4pts) beat Barbados (0pts) by three runs (D-L method)
- Leeward Islands (5pts) beat Jamaica (0pts) by nine wickets
- Windward Islands (4pts) beat Trinidad and Tobago (0pts) by 17 runs

==== Matchday Two, 4 October ====
The following day, Guyana and the Leewards faced each other, and the Leewards became the first – and only – team to avoid defeat against the Guyanese in this year's tournament. After Leewards captain Sylvester Joseph sent Guyana in to bat, and after half-centuries from Narsingh Deonarine (52 with five fours and two sixes), and Shivnarine Chanderpaul (off 44 balls, ending with 52), along with another century from Sarwan, Guyana made a total of 291 for 5 in conditions described as "excellent" for batting by the Guyana Chronicle. The Leewards then struck three half-centuries from the top – Runako Morton was dropped twice on 0 before going on to make 68 – and they needed nine off the final over, getting eight off the first five balls before Carl Simon edged the final delivery to the wicket-keeper. The other matches ended in the Windwards chasing down Jamaica's 230 in 40.1 of 43 allotted overs to go top of the table with eight points – one ahead of the Leewards and two more than Guyana – while reigning champions Trinidad and Tobago lost to Barbados and were the joint bottom of the table after two games.

- Barbados (4pts) beat Trinidad and Tobago (0pts) by 41 runs (D-L method)
- Guyana (2pts) tied with Leeward Islands (2pts)
- Windward Islands (4pts) beat Jamaica (0pts) by four wickets (D-L method)

==== Matchday Three, 6 October ====
5 October saw no matches, but the following day the Leewards went top of the table and became the first team to qualify for the Final Four after a victory described as "miraculous" by the Guyana Chronicle. Their opponents Trinidad and Tobago were chasing 245 to win and needed three off the last over with a wicket in hand and West Indies wicket-keeper Denesh Ramdin at the crease on 48, facing the first ball from Gavin Tonge (who had bowled nine overs for 60 previously). A fast, full-length ball saw Ramdin play across the line, missing the ball as it hit him on the pad, and the umpire gave him lbw. With no more wickets remaining, the Trinbagonians had lost by two runs. Guyana went second in the table after their seven-run win over Jamaica, with Sarwan missing out on a third successive century but still making 63 off 59 balls in a total of 219, and Jamaica then lost four wickets for 20 runs at the death to need 22 off the last eight balls; they could only get 14. The Windward Islands also went down for the first time of the season, losing to Barbados after needing seven runs off the final over. They had needed 92 with four wickets in hand in the 34th over, but Rawl Lewis and Liam Sebastien put on 81 in 14.1 overs, and Sebastien was batting with the number 10 Mervyn Matthew. He was bowled on the first ball from substitute Corey Collymore, and Alvin LaFeuille could only make four off the final five balls as the Windwards closed one run short of a tie.

- Guyana (4pts) beat Jamaica (0pts) by seven runs
- Leeward Islands (4pts) beat Trinidad and Tobago (0pts) by two runs
- Barbados (4pts) beat Windward Islands (0pts) by one run

==== Matchday Four, 7 October ====
The Leeward Islands were toppled from the top of the table on 7 October, after losing to Barbados in a match where Collymore took his first five-for in regional one-day competitions to become Man of the Match. Barbados had batted first, making 229 before their number 11 Tino Best was run out with seven balls remaining, but Collymore took three of the first four wickets as the Leewards were 27 for 4. 73 from captain Sylvester Joseph took them close, but Collymore returned to end with five for 27 from ten overs, helping Barbados to limit the Leewards to a total of 212 for 9 which meant that Barbados had qualified for the semis. Guyana took over the ascendancy, qualifying for the Final Four after bowling the Windward Islands out for 197 to take a 55-run win and a bonus point to boot, while Jamaica and Trinidad/Tobago – the only teams without a win in the competition – faced off at Wildey. In a match shortened to 20 overs after heavy morning rain, Jamaica bowled out the Trinbagonians for 101, with five bowlers getting wickets, before opening batsman Danza Hyatt hit 47 not out and Jamaica took a bonus point, also eliminating Trinidad and Tobago in the process. With five points, they were still fifth in the table, three points behind the Windwards.

- Barbados (4pts) beat Leeward Islands (0pts) by 17 runs
- Guyana (5pts) beat Windward Islands (0pts) by 55 runs
- Jamaica (5pts) beat Trinidad and Tobago (0pts) by six wickets

==== Matchday Five, 9 October ====
After a rest day, Guyana beat Trinidad and Tobago as the former finished unbeaten and the latter without a win, but the fight for the last place was between Jamaica and the Windward Islands. Jamaica did their part of the job, chasing 209 against Barbados with six overs to spare after 75 from opener Brenton Parchment (who was dropped off Collymore on 28 – Collymore ended with four overs for 10 with the scalp of Hyatt), but in the islands battle, the Windwards dismissed the Leewards for 144 after three wickets from captain Lewis, and West Indies opener Devon Smith hit 59 in the chase as the Windwards went past the target with 7.3 overs to spare, sending them into the Final Four.

- Guyana (5pts) beat Trinidad and Tobago (0pts) by eight wickets
- Jamaica (4pts) beat Barbados (0pts) by six wickets
- Windward Islands (4pts) beat Leeward Islands (0pts) by six wickets

=== Final four ===
==== Semi-Final One: Guyana v Leeward Islands, 12 October ====
Guyana beat the Leeward Islands by seven wickets to qualify for the KFC Cup Final

The four qualifying teams arrived in Guyana on 10 October, with the first semi-final played two days later. All three matches were played at the Bourda ground, and Guyana's Ramnaresh Sarwan became the first player to score three centuries in a domestic limited-overs tournament season, making an unbeaten 113 in a chase of a target of 242 set by the Leeward Islands in the first semi-final. Sarwan also passed Keith Arthurton's eight-year-old record tournament aggregate of 408 runs in a tournament. Earlier, Runako Morton and Wilden Cornwall had hit half-centuries as the Leewards made 241 for 8 in 50 overs, but the second-wicket partnership between opener Sewnarine Chattergoon and Sarwan was worth 109 runs, and Sarwan pushed on to make it to the target.

==== Semi-Final Two: Barbados v Windward Islands, 14 October ====
Barbados beat Windward Islands by 41 runs (D-L method) to qualify for the KFC Cup Final

The other semi-final was played two days later in overcast conditions, and the bad light conditions brought Duckworth-Lewis into play. Barbados had made 270 for 7, with Dwayne Smith hitting 96 off 81 balls amid Kenroy Peters' three-wicket-haul, and Courtney Browne and Ian Bradshaw added 67 for the last wicket as Barbados accumulated 270 for 7. Corey Collymore took two early wickets, but the Windwards recovered to 100 for 3 in the 25th over when play was stopped. 12 overs were lost, and the Windwards set a target of 217 – they lost five wickets in the process, and could only get 75 of the 117 runs required, losing by 41 runs.

==== Final: Guyana v Barbados, 16 October ====
Guyana beat Barbados by seven runs (D-L method) to win the KFC Cup

On Sunday 16 October the tournament was rounded off with the Barbados v Guyana final. Barbados were inserted by the Guyana captain Chanderpaul, and though they lost no wickets in their opening 25 overs, they scored at a rate below four an over as they were 90 for no loss midway through their innings. Guyana spinners Mahendra Nagamootoo then got the first breakthrough, dismissing Kurt Wilkinson for 43, and though Martin Nurse went on to hit 63 and Ryan Hinds and Floyd Reifer also hit scores in excess of 30, Nagamootoo and Neil McGarrell shared six wickets in their 18 overs, and Barbados lost four wickets for 16 to end with a total of 249 for 8. Chasing, Guyana started with a 92-run opening partnership between Sewnarine Chattergoon and Krishna Arjune before Bradshaw and Collymore broke through for Barbados, dismissing Arjune and their West Indies team partners Sarwan and Chanderpaul, leaving Guyana at 119 for 3. TV replays indicated to Guyana Chronicle writer Allan La Rose that Chanderpaul had not hit the ball when he was given out caught behind, but in the end it mattered little – Chattergoon put on a further 90 with Deonarine, as Guyana reached 209 for 4 with 55 balls remaining, but when Deonarine was dismissed another three Guyanese followed, including Chattergoon, bowled by Fidel Edwards for 119. He later rated the innings the "best of his life". At the end of Edwards' over, the umpires offered the light to the batsmen, but McGarrell and Darwin Christian chose to bat on to make sure of the victory. They lost no further wicket in the next three overs before they were offered the light again, requiring three to win off the final over, which was not bowled; instead, Guyana were declared seven-run winners on the Duckworth-Lewis method.

== West Indies in Australia ==
The West Indies cricket team travelled to Australia in November, playing three Tests against the Australian team for the Frank Worrell Trophy. After a 0–5 whitewash on the last tour of Australia five years ago, the West Indies were hoping for a better result, but they never ran Australia closer than seven wickets in a Test match. Australia were inserted in the first Test, and after a spell after lunch yielded three wickets for Corey Collymore and Australia were 111 for 4, Ricky Ponting put on a century stand with Adam Gilchrist, and double-digit contributions from the rest of the order (excluding the number 11 Glenn McGrath) gave Australia a total of 435. West Indies were then rolled over twice, for 210 and 129, with Australia batting to 283 for 2 declared in between, as they lost by 379 runs. The second Test saw the West Indies win the toss, bat, and surrender a 257-run first-innings lead. Dwayne Bravo hit a career-best 113 in the second innings, sharing a 182-run seventh-wicket stand which set a target of 78 for the Australians, but they still won by nine wickets. Brian Lara made an unbeaten double ton on the first day of the third Test, ending on 226 to set a Test career record with his 11,204 runs at the end of the match. However, Australia made 428 when they batted, Shane Warne took six for 80 and helped take the West Indies apart to 204 in the second innings, and Matthew Hayden's 87 not out gave Australia victory on the final day. The West Indies Cricket Board later lodged a complaint with the International Cricket Council, regarding the umpiring decisions in the series, asking for video assessment of the decisions made. The ICC general manager Dave Richardson later acknowledged that errors had been made.

- First Test: Australia beat West Indies by 379 runs
- Second Test: Australia beat West Indies by nine wickets
- Third Test: Australia beat West Indies by seven wickets to win Test Series 3–0 and the Frank Worrell Trophy

== Carib Beer Series ==
The Carib Beer Cup, the league stage of the domestic first class cricket tournament of the West Indies, lasted from 25 November to 5 February. The four top teams then qualified for the Carib Beer Challenge, a direct knock-out tournament which was moved to April due to rain cancelling one of the rounds.

=== Carib Beer Cup ===
==== Guyana v Barbados, 25–28 November ====
Barbados (6pts) drew with Guyana (3pts)

Barbados and Guyana met for the third time in two months, this time at the Everest Cricket Club in Georgetown, Guyana, and once again Barbados failed to win, though they did gain a first innings lead and the lead in the table. After Guyana batted to a total of 241 on the first day, with Barbados bowler Ian Bradshaw taking five for 50 including top-scorer Travis Dowlin, opening batsmen Dale Richards made 127 for Barbados, as they took a first innings lead on day two. Alcindo Holder was there on 5, and he added a further 78 before he was caught behind off Nagamootoo, being last out at 394. Guyana batted out the remaining day and a half, closing on 309 for 9 to draw the match, with Guyana's Narsingh Deonarine named Man of the Match after an unbeaten 136 in the second innings. (CricketArchive scorecard)

==== Jamaica v Leeward Islands, 25–28 November ====
Jamaica (6pts) drew with Leeward Islands (3pts)

Jamaica were criticised by the fans after this match, with their spectators voicing their concerns after Jamaica had accepted the umpires' offer of going off and taking the points for a draw in a finish described as "enthralling" by the Jamaica Observer. Jamaica had won the toss and decided to field, and half-centuries from Runako Morton and Shane Jeffers had sent the Leewards to 159 for 2 before slow left arm bowler Nikita Miller got two wickets in four balls. The Leewards added 26 before tea, but the post-tea session lasted 8.4 overs, yielded 11 runs, and the Leewards lost their remaining six wickets. Andrew Richardson, returning from a back injury sustained in 2003–04, took five of the wickets for four runs in his four overs, while Miller got the last wicket of Adam Sanford. On the second day, Jamaica lost five wickets for 13 runs to go to 193 for 9, but Richardson and Jerome Taylor ensured first innings points with a 30-run last-wicket stand. The Leewards openers caught up with that lead, however, and thanks to Jeffers' 88 they passed 200 in their second innings on a rain-hit third day. They ended on 242, setting a target of 216 for Jamaica, who lost Brenton Parchment and Denza Hyatt for single-digit scores to be 20 for 2. More wickets followed, as no Jamaican batsmen made it past 50, and after Carl Simon and Sanford had taken three wickets each Jamaica were at 187 for 9. The last-wicket pairing of Odean Brown and Jerome Taylor then added 25 for the last wicket, and with 7.3 overs remaining and four runs to get they were offered to go off by the umpires. With Brown's elbow damaged, their captain Tamar Lambert agreed to the offer, to end the match in a draw. (CricketArchive scorecard)

==== Jamaica v Windward Islands, 2–5 December ====
Jamaica (6pts) drew with Windward Islands (3pts)

After Jamaica had won the toss and chosen to bat, they made 204 in the first innings, which was cut in two by the rain. Six Jamaican batsmen made scores between 23 and 30 in the first innings, while Windwards bowler Kenroy Peters bowled 11 maiden overs to end with bowling figures of 20–11–18–3. The Windwards batted to 56 for one at the close, rain interrupting their innings as they were, according to a Caribbean Media Corporation report, "looking to take control". However, the last nine Windwards wickets fell for 71, after seamers Dave Bernard, Andrew Richardson and Nikita Miller had taken five wickets for 13 and the Windwards were at 86 for 6. Leading by 60, Jamaica added a further 188 before declaring midway through the fourth morning with number three Shawn Findlay on 70 not out. Bernard then took three wickets, helping Jamaica to take the first six wickets for 88, but Junior Murray and Rawl Lewis shared 35 for the eighth wicket in a little over an hour to halt the Jamaicans. The hosts could not force a win, as the Windwards ended on 144 for 8, but took the lead in the Carib Beer Series table. (Scorecard from West Indies Cricket Board)

==== Leeward Islands v Trinidad and Tobago, 2–5 December ====
Trinidad and Tobago (6pts) drew with Leeward Islands (3pts)

The first day's play was entirely washed out, and the second day's play cut to 51 overs, as rain and bad light had a say in this match at Anguilla ending in a draw. Leeward Islands won the toss, and concluded their innings 20 overs into the third morning when Mervyn Dillon removed Adam Sanford, and the Leewards closed on 171. All the Trinidad bowlers got wickets, Dave Mohammed taking the most with three, and also bowling the most. Omari Banks snared two wickets for the Leewards, and Trinidad were 146 for 6 before captain Darren Ganga was joined by Richard Kelly. Both completed their half-centuries, sharing a stand of 75 before Ganga smacked a full toss from Banks to Sylvester Joseph to be out for 65 – enough to be named Man of the Match. Trinidad and Tobago were eventually bowled out for 274 midway through the morning session on day four, and the Leewards were 26 for two just before lunch, but a stand of 105 between Austin Richards and Sylvester Joseph ensured that the Leewards ended on 131 for three. (Scorecard from West Indies Cricket Board)

The games scheduled for the next weekend, from 9 to 12 December, were postponed due to rain and set back to February.

==== Trinidad and Tobago v Jamaica, 6–9 January ====
Trinidad and Tobago (12pts) beat Jamaica (0pts) by 282 runs

Trinidad and Tobago batted first, and after spinner Gareth Breese took four wickets on the first day, the hosts were 135 for 5, but the hosts' captain Daren Ganga hit 93 in 283 minutes before he was lbw with the score on 181. Breese got four for 44 in 18 overs on the first day, but his 19 overs on the second yielded one more wicket for 52 runs, as Dinesh Ramdin and Richard Kelly added 100 for the seventh wicket. Ramdin pressed on, his innings totalling 125 as he was left not out, and Trinidad and Tobago had made 386. Jamaica made it to 82 for 1, but Dwayne Bravo and Dave Mohammed shared seven of the last nine wickets, which fell for 111 runs. Marlon Samuels was the only batsman to pass 30 for Jamaica, ending with 63 before he was caught behind off Bravo. The hosts batted for 41 third-day overs, making 178 for 7 declared as Kelly top-scored with 43 not out, and declared 371 ahead overnight. Trinidad and Tobago had a day to bowl Jamaica out; they spent three hours, after Rayad Emrit took the first three wickets, all bowled, to end figures of 10–3–13–3 and Dave Mohammed's left arm spin yielded five for 41 to bowl Jamaica out for a total of 89. The title holders Jamaica thus fell eight points behind Trinidad and Tobago, who were the new leaders in the league (CricketArchive scorecard)

==== Windward Islands v Barbados, 6–9 January ====
Barbados (6pts) drew with Windward Islands (3pts)

This was the fifth of six drawn matches thus far in the tournament, as rain and bad playing conditions curtailed play enough to prevent a result. Barbados batted first, and closed on 365 just before the close of play on day two, with Alcindo Holder top-scoring with 84 in his second first-class match. Windwards captain Rawl Lewis took six for 105, but coming in at eight with the total 202 for 6, he only made 17 with the bat as the Windwards were bowled out early on the fourth day, with Barbados dropping "several chances" on the third. Barbados hit 109 in 23 overs before declaring, but after Ryan Austin and Ryan Nurse shared four wickets and the Windwards lost their first five for 52, Junior Murray and Darren Sammy batted out the last fifty minutes to secure the draw. (Cricinfo scorecard)

==== Barbados v Jamaica, 13–16 January ====
Barbados (12pts) beat Jamaica (0pts) by ten wickets

Last year's champions Jamaica suffered their second loss on their mini-tour of the Lesser Antilles, after Barbados fast bowler Fidel Edwards removing the first three batsmen to see Jamaica to seven for three after they were inserted by Barbados captain Ryan Hinds. Barbados bowled Jamaica out for 129 and took a 290-run lead on first innings after four half-centuries, with a top score of 94 from Dwayne Smith, and though Jamaica replied with 319 in the second innings, Edwards dug out another four wickets and the openers reached the target of 30 after 22 deliveries. The win put Barbados back on top of the table, but with one game more than Trinidad and Tobago in second place. (West Indies Cricket Board scorecard)

==== Leeward Islands v Guyana, 13–16 January ====
Guyana (6pts) drew with Leeward Islands (3pts)

Guyana batted to a total of 547 for 8 declared at Saint Martin, with Krishna Arjune and Travis Dowlin hitting centuries, and though they gave up batting shortly before the end of the second day Guyana could not force a win. Narsingh Deonarine took five for 94 in the second innings, but the Leewards still batted into the morning session on day four to make 349. Guyana did not enforce the follow on, and after the Leewards got two wickets thanks to Adam Sanford, Deonarine and Shiv Chanderpaul hit half-centuries to secure the draw. (CricketArchive scorecard)

==== Trinidad and Tobago v Guyana, 20–23 January ====
Trinidad and Tobago (6pts) drew with Guyana (3pts)

Guyana made 346 after being put in to bat at Guaracara Park, with West Indies player Ramnaresh Sarwan top-scoring with 122, but Trinidad and Tobago responded with a 159-run third wicket stand between Brian Lara and Daren Ganga. Esuan Crandon took three wickets, of Ganga, Dwayne Bravo and Sherwin Ganga, and Trinidad and Tobago were 215 for 5, needing a further 132 to gain a first innings lead. Lara continued, however, and after 270 minutes he brought up his fifth hundred at this ground. He continued to make 153, which left Trinidad and Tobago close at 332 for 8 when he was caught by Shivnarine Chanderpaul off the bowling of Crandon; Rayad Emrit took them into the lead with a half-century, and the hosts closed on 398. The last day saw some rain, and Guyana eventually closed on 159 for 3; Trinidad and Tobago captain Daren Ganga said afterwards that "We always knew that this game was a first innings affair and we achieved the result we wanted.". Trinidad now stood level with Barbados in the standings. (CricketArchive scorecard)

==== Windward Islands v Leeward Islands, 20–23 January ====
Match abandoned; Windward Islands (4pts), Leeward Islands (4pts)

The scheduled match at Mindoo Philip Park was abandoned after rain left the pitch and outfield under water. (CricketArchive scorecard)

==== Jamaica v Guyana, 27–30 January ====
Guyana (12pts) beat Jamaica (0pts) by 51 runs

Scores of 75 from both Sewnarine Chattergoon and Shivnarine Chanderpaul took Guyana to 260 for 5 at Chedwin Park, Jamaica, as the hosts used eight bowlers in the second innings but still only got four wickets on the first day. Six on the second took Guyana out for 314, but Reon King took four of Guyana's six on the second day, and Jamaica fell to 48 for 6. Wavell Hinds and Gareth Breese added two short of that figure for the seventh wicket, and Jamaica eventually totalled 144, 20 short of the follow on target, which was not enforced. Guyana closed the third day on 114 for 6, and the Jamaica Observer claimed Jamaica needed an extraordinary effort to make it through. On the final day, Guyana were bowled out for 163, setting Jamaica 334 to win in 69 overs. Marlon Samuels spent 99 balls for his 81, as Jamaica attempted to score at the required five an over, but four wickets from Narsingh Deonarine helped bowl Jamaica out for 282, Reon King taking the last wicket by bowling Daren Powell for 57. Jamaica, champions of both the league stage and the cup stage last season, were thus eliminated with 12 points from five games. (CricketArchive scorecard)

==== Leeward Islands v Barbados, 27–30 January ====
Barbados (12pts) beat Leeward Islands (0pts) by 173 runs

Barbados took a twelve-point lead on the Carib Beer Series table with a round to play after twin centuries from captain Ryan Hinds, who also took four wickets to become Man of the Match. Hinds had opted to bat first after winning the toss, and after Leewards bowler Adam Sanford took the first four wickets at St Thomas, Hinds built partnerships with Alcindo Holder (65 for the fifth wicket) and Ian Bradshaw (141 for the seventh, the highest seventh-wicket partnership in this season's tournament. Barbados ended on 360, and after a 104-run fourth-wicket partnership between Austin Richards and Sylvester Joseph, the Leewards lost seven wickets to Ian Bradshaw and Ryan Austin. Leading by 102, Barbados built onwards, with Dwayne Smith retiring hurt on 20 but returning to make 48 and Ryan Hinds once again top-scoring with 150. The Leewards were set 409 to win in well over a day, and despite the second half-century in as many matches from Steve Liburd, Barbados bowled them out for 236 to win the match. With one game left, against Trinidad and Tobago, Barbados would secure the Carib Beer Cup title by avoiding defeat. (CricketArchive scorecard)

==== Trinidad and Tobago v Windward Islands, 27–30 January ====
Windward Islands (12pts) beat Trinidad and Tobago (0pts) by 86 runs

The Windward Islands won their first game of the season, thwarting Trinidad's hopes of keeping up with Barbados in the league table, with Deighton Butler named Man of the Match after three wickets in the second innings. The Windwards batted first, with Hyron Shallow scoring 63 in a first innings worth 218; however, Trinidad and Tobago were reported by the Trinidad Express to have dropped eight catches. Trinidad were 36 for 4 in reply after three wickets from Rawl Lewis, but a 52-run seventh-wicket stand between Denesh Ramdin and Richard Kelly helped them post 162. More dropped catches – the Trinidad Express counted five – helped the Windwards add 77 by the close of day three, and a further 41 on day four before they were bowled out. Despite the dropped catches, seven of the Windwards batsmen were dismissed caught, with the remaining three stumped by Ramdin. Set 175 to win, only captain Daren Ganga passed 20 for Trinidad and Tobago, and they had fallen from 19 for 1 to 37 for 7 before Rayad Emrit and Dave Mohammed helped Ganga build two partnerships past 20. It was not enough, however; Mohammed was left not out on 13 and Dennis George could take the final wicket as the Windwards won by 86 runs and qualified for the semi-final stages. (CricketArchive scorecard)

==== Barbados v Trinidad and Tobago, 2–5 February ====
Trinidad and Tobago (12pts) beat Barbados (0pts) by 264 runs

Trinidad and Tobago were coming off a loss in the Windward Islands three days earlier, and needed a win on both first innings and overall to wrest the Cup title from Barbados, who had a 12-point gap at the top of the table. Trinidad were put in to bat after the hosting captain won the toss, and immediately lost Imran Khan to Fidel Edwards, with the opening partnership worth seven runs. However, half-centuries from Lendl Simmons, Brian Lara and Denesh Ramdin took Trinidad and Tobago to 172 for 3, and 28 runs from Rayad Emrit helped them past 200. Edwards took three wickets, but was also the most expensive bowler, costing 87 in 17 overs. Barbados were then called in to bat for the last 45 minutes of the first day, losing four wickets for fifteen runs by stumps, with Mervyn Dillon taking a wicket in his first over and ending the day with figures of 5–2–6–2. Floyd Reifer and Ryan Austin then added 86 for the fifth wicket, but five Trinidad bowlers then got wickets to round Barbados up for 167. Trinidad and Tobago then made 145 for 1 before the close of day two, continued onwards to 287 for 2 before Daren Ganga and Brian Lara went off for lunch. Ganga never returned, having been hit on the forearm by a ball from Edwards, and Barbados took the last seven wickets for 32 as Trinidad and Tobago were all out for 319. Chasing what would have been a record first class target in the West Indies, with 412, no Barbadian batsman managed to pass 35, as Dillon and Dave Mohammed shared three wickets each on the third day and Dillon added two more on the fourth morning to bowl Barbados out for 147 and win the Carib Beer Cup title for Trinidad and Tobago. Brian Lara described it as "literally taking the Cup off their shelf" and said the win gave him "an amazing feeling". It was Barbados' worst loss by runs since the tournament began in 1966. (CricketArchive scorecard)

==== Windward Islands v Guyana, 2–5 February ====
Guyana (6pts) drew with Windward Islands (3pts)

After choosing to bat, the Windward Islands were bowled out for 189 on the first day at Grenada, with spinner Mahendra Nagamootoo taking five for 48 off his 28 overs. Guyana lost one wicket on the first day, and were 147 for 7 in reply, but Ramnaresh Sarwan made a century and shared a 96-run eighth-wicket stand with Rayon Griffith. Guyana totalled 276 to secure the first innings lead. Rain then interrupted play on the third day for nearly two hours, and Devon Smith made 63 to take the Windwards to 148 for 2, and play on the fourth day was delayed until past lunch due to a waterlogged outfield. Hyron Shallow joined Smith in the list of half-centurions as the Windwards ended on 283 for 5, Nagamootoo once again bowling the most and taking the most wickets (two for 71). (CricketArchive scorecard)

=== Carib Beer Challenge ===
==== Semi-final: Trinidad and Tobago v Windward Islands, 7–10 April ====
Trinidad and Tobago beat Windward Islands by 391 runs and qualified for the final

Trinidad and Tobago got revenge for their loss in the league stage, though they lost their first five wickets for 42 after opting to bat at Guaracara Park. Deighton Butler and Jean Paul took two wickets each in the morning session, but failed to take any more, and Jason Mohammed put on 124 with Richard Kelly for the sixth wicket. Four wickets then fell for five runs, but the last-wicket stand of 84 between Mohammed and Amit Jaggernauth took Trinidad and Tobago past 250. Jaggernauth then took four wickets, as no Windwards batsman passed 30, and with spinner Dave Mohammed also grabbing three Trinidad and Tobago earned a lead of 124. Daren Ganga's 161 then helped Trinidad and Tobago to a total of 416, and Dave Mohammed rounded off with seven for 48, his best first class figures. (West Indies Cricket Board scorecard)

==== Semi-final: Barbados v Guyana, 7–10 April ====
Match drawn; Barbados qualified for the final on first innings result

Krishna Arjune and Sewnarine Chattergoon put on 106 for Guyana's first wicket after they were inserted by Barbados' captain Ryan Hinds, but this was more than all the other nine partnerships combined, as Dwayne Smith's seamers yielded three for 17 and five bowlers got wickets. In reply, Barbados were 101 for 6 after three wickets from spinner Mahendra Nagamootoo, but half-centuries from Ian Bradshaw (81) and captain Hinds (52) helped Barbados get a first innings lead. Guyana replied with 316 for 9 declared, with both Chattergoon and Neil McGarrell scoring 82, but they needed to bowl out Barbados to win the match and proceed to the final. Floyd Reifer hit 101 for Barbados to help them earn a draw on the final day, though Guyana did peg them back from 172 for 2 to 261 for 7 after wickets from Nagamootoo and McGarrell. It was not enough, and Barbados thus had the opportunity to get revenge for the crucial league defeat to Trinidad and Tobago. (West Indies Cricket Board scorecard)

==== Final: Trinidad and Tobago v Barbados, 15–19 April ====
Trinidad and Tobago won by 125 runs and won the Carib Beer Challenge

Brian Lara had returned to the side for the final game, which was played at Guaracara Park, Pointe-à-Pierre. Daren Ganga, T&T's captain, won the toss and chose to bat, and Trinidad/Tobago lost eight wickets on the first day. According to Trinidad Guardian correspondent Naz Yacoob, "almost all the batsmen were out to soft dismissals", and they were described as being in "a spot of bother" at the end of the day, with the total on 223 for 8. Pedro Collins took three wickets, including Lara lbw for 2, and Ryan Hinds and Ian Bradshaw picked up a couple each. Rayad Emrit and Dave Mohammed then added 102 to the overnight ninth-wicket stand of 20, and though Corey Collymore and Pedro Collins managed to dismiss the two for 112 (Emrit) and 50 (Mohammed), the final Trinidad/Tobago total stood at 340. Barbados replied with 130 for 5 to close out the second day, with Emrit taking two wickets; four of the top five batsmen made double figures, but captain Hinds' score of 25 was the highest. That changed on the third day, however, as former West Indies U–19 player Kirk Edwards, on debut for Barbados, converted his overnight total of 18 to a top score of 64 before substitute fielder Sherwin Ganga held a catch off Dave Mohammed's bowling. Thanks partly to Edwards' efforts, the last five Barbados partnerships added 165, however, 60 more than the top five, as Patrick Browne (No. 7), Ian Bradshaw (No. 8) and Ryan Austin (No. 9) all passed 25, and Barbados closed their innings trailing by 70. During their third day outing, Trinidad and Tobago lost five wickets for 99 runs, including two run outs, but Richard Kelly shared a 77-run stand with Rayad Emrit across the third and fourth day to boost their lead, and eventually made 93, the second highest score of the match and the highest first class score of his career thus far. Trinidad/Tobago totalled 262 in their second innings, setting Barbados 333 to win in a day and a half, and the openers Dale Richards and Wayne Blackman cut 86 off that target. However, Barbados lost four wickets for 13 runs to Kelly and Amit Jaggernauth, and closed out the day on 110 for 4. On the final day, Trinidad/Tobago's spinners ensured that there would be no repeat of the lower order outscoring the top; Mohammed took four and Jaggernauth two, and after the 40-run sixth-wicket stand between Hinds and Browne, the last four wickets fell for 41 runs to secure the double title for Trinidad and Tobago. Emrit's efforts of 140 runs and three wickets was enough to give him Man of the Match honours. (CricketArchive scorecard)

== West Indies in New Zealand ==
February and March consisted of nine matches against New Zealand for the West Indies team – they played one Twenty20 match, five One Day Internationals, and three Tests. The tour gave poor results for the West Indies, who won one solitary match, and that was the fifth of the One Day Internationals when they were already 0–4 down in the series. They also drew one of the Tests to avoid the whitewash, and lost the Twenty20 match on a bowl out. It was not quite as poor as the tour in 1999–2000, when New Zealand won the ODIs 5–0 and the Tests 2–0, but it nevertheless meant that West Indies fell further adrift in the international rankings.

The U-19 team went to Sri Lanka in February, playing in the U-19 World Cup. After defeating South Africa and the United States, West Indies fell in both play-off matches, and shared seventh place with Zimbabwe.

=== Twenty20 and ODIs ===
In the Twenty20 match, West Indies had totalled 126 for 7, and New Zealand had only made 110 for 8 in their first 19 overs, with an over still to go. However, James Franklin hit the first ball of the over for six, and Shane Bond hit a four to tie the scores. Bond then broke the stumps twice in the bowl out, which New Zealand won 3–0.

Two days later, New Zealand totalled 288 for 9 in the first ODI, which was enough to secure victory; Ramnaresh Sarwan top-scored with 56 but took 83 balls, more than below the required run rate, and West Indies were bowled out for 207. 76 from Wavell Hinds was the highlight of the second match for the West Indies, but the total of 200 for 9 was overcome by New Zealand in 42 overs, though they were 13 for 4 after two wickets each from Fidel Edwards and Ian Bradshaw. In the third match, Nathan Astle hit a century, and though Sarwan hit his second half-century on tour West Indies were bowled out for 255, with Jeetan Patel taking three wickets. The win secured the series for New Zealand, but they weren't done; 102 from Lou Vincent helped them make a total of 324 for 6 in 50 overs, and though Runako Morton scored a century, he took 155 balls to make 110. West Indies closed on 233 for 8, well short of the required total. However, Dwayne Smith helped turn the final match West Indies' way; he took five for 45 at Eden Park as New Zealand were bowled out for 233, and though West Indies made six runs from their first six overs (and still lost the wicket of Chris Gayle) they made it to the target with three wickets and two balls to spare. However, writer Vaneisa Baksh claimed "the win did nothing for anyone, not even for New Zealand."

- Twenty20 International: New Zealand beat West Indies 3–0 after bowl out
- First One-Day International: New Zealand beat West Indies by 81 runs
- Second One-Day International: New Zealand beat West Indies by three wickets
- Third One-Day International: New Zealand beat West Indies by 21 runs
- Fourth One-Day International: New Zealand beat West Indies by 91 runs
- Fifth One-Day International: West Indies beat New Zealand by three wickets; New Zealand won the series 4–1

=== Test Matches ===
West Indies lost the first two Tests, but in the final Test at Napier only 78.1 of the scheduled 450 overs were bowled, and West Indies drew to avoid recording the longest streak of Test defeats by any team apart from Bangladesh and Zimbabwe. However, after three days of the first Test, Cricinfo reported that West Indies went in "with more than just a sniff of their first overseas win against opponents other than Bangladesh and Zimbabwe in six years." New Zealand had taken a lead of 18 on first innings after an unbeaten 103 and two for 23 from Scott Styris, while Dwayne Bravo had built partnerships of 89 (with Ramnaresh Sarwan) and 58 (with Dwayne Smith) to take West Indies back after being at 90 for 5. New Zealand were then 146 for 7 in reply, Bradshaw and Edwards taking out the top order, but 74 from Brendon McCullum helped New Zealand set a target of 291 in what was described as a "see-saw match". In reply, West Indies were 148 for no loss, but Nathan Astle broke the opening stand and Shane Bond picked up four wickets as the team fell to 263 and a 27-run defeat. Brian Lara was bowled by Bond for a golden duck.

The next match was also won by New Zealand, whose first innings total of 372 was the highest all series; West Indies' two totals of 192 and 218 were the two lowest in completed innings. Despite lacking Shane Bond, New Zealand's bowlers got the twenty wickets required, with James Franklin taking seven including a first-innings five-for and Kyle Mills six. With New Zealand helped by half-centuries from Peter Fulton, Stephen Fleming and Nathan Astle then defied Fidel Edwards, who got five for 65, and New Zealand made it to a series-clinching ten-wicket win after 23 not out from Hamish Marshall. In the third Test, West Indies made it to 256 for 4 in the 78.1 overs possible on the first two days, and the other three were rained off as the match ended in a draw.

- First Test: New Zealand beat West Indies by 27 runs
- Second Test: New Zealand beat West Indies by ten wickets
- Third Test: New Zealand drew with West Indies and won the series 2–0
