= 2006–07 KFC Cup =

Cricket tournament

- Dates: 9 January – 17 February 2007
- Administrator: WICB
- Cricket format: List A (50 overs)
- Tournament format(s): Group stage, finals
- Champions: Trinidad and Tobago (8th title)
- Participants: 6
- Matches: 18
- Most runs: (Trinidad and Tobago) Kieron Pollard (261)
- Most wickets: (Jamaica) Jermaine Lawson (13)

The 2006–07 KFC Cup was the 33rd edition of the Regional Super50, the domestic limited-overs cricket competition for the countries of the West Indies Cricket Board (WICB). The competition was played between 9 January and 17 February 2007, using a round-robin format followed by play-offs.

The six teams participating in the competition were Barbados, Guyana, Jamaica, the Leeward Islands, Trinidad and Tobago, and the Windward Islands. Trinidad and Tobago were undefeated in the round-robin, and eventually defeated the Windward Islands in the final to win their eighth domestic one-day title. The semi-finals and final were all held in Saint Vincent and the Grenadines, at Kingstown's Arnos Vale Stadium. Trinidad and Tobago's Kieron Pollard led the tournament in runs, while Jamaican fast bowler Jermaine Lawson took the most wickets.

== Squads ==
Barbados	Guyana	Jamaica
Ryan Hinds (c); Sulieman Benn; Jason Bennett; Tino Best; Wayne Blackman; Ian Bradshaw; Shamarh Brooks; Patrick Browne; Corey Collymore; Fidel Edwards; Alcino Holder; Carlo Morris; Floyd Reifer; Dale Richards; Kemar Roach; Javon Searles; Dwayne Smith; Kevin Stoute; Ryan Wiggins	Narsingh Deonarine (c); Krishna Arjune; Shivnarine Chanderpaul; Sewnarine Chattergoon; Derwin Christian; Esuan Crandon; Royston Crandon; Travis Dowlin; Dion Ferrier; Assad Fudadin; Azeemul Haniff; Reon King; Mahendra Nagamootoo; Veerasammy Permaul; Ramnaresh Sarwan	Wavell Hinds (c); Carlton Baugh; David Bernard; Bevon Brown; Odean Brown; Chris Gayle; Danza Hyatt; Lorenzo Ingram; Tamar Lambert; Jermaine Lawson; Nikita Miller; Brenton Parchment; Daren Powell; Sheldon Powell; Andrew Richardson; Marlon Samuels; Jerome Taylor
Leeward Islands	Trinidad and Tobago	Windward Islands
Sylvester Joseph (c); Justin Athanaze; Lionel Baker; Omari Banks; Wilden Cornwall; Chaka Hodge; Shane Jeffers; Kerry Jeremy; Javier Liburd; Steve Liburd; Runako Morton; Austin Richards; Codville Rogers; Adam Sanford; Carl Simon; Gavin Tonge; Tonito Willett; Jason Williams	Daren Ganga (c); Adrian Barath; Darren Bravo; Dwayne Bravo; Merv Dillon; Rayad Emrit; Sherwin Ganga; Sanjiv Gooljar; Amit Jaggernauth; Richard Kelly; Theodore Modeste; Dave Mohammed; Gibran Mohammed; Jason Mohammed; William Perkins; Kieron Pollard; Denesh Ramdin; Ravi Rampaul; Lendl Simmons	Rawl Lewis (c); Miles Bascombe; Deighton Butler; Heron Campbell; Ronald Etienne; Andre Fletcher; Ezekiel Francis; Dennis George; Lindon James; Garey Mathurin; Mervin Matthew; Junior Murray; Kenroy Peters; Darren Sammy; Liam Sebastien; Hyron Shallow; Devon Smith

== Round-robin stage ==
Team	Pld	W	L	T	NR	Pts	NRR
Trinidad and Tobago	5	5	0	0	0	20	+1.114
Barbados	5	3	1	0	1	14	–0.052
Windward Islands	5	2	2	0	1	10	–0.064
Guyana	5	2	3	0	0	8	–0.081
Jamaica	5	2	3	0	0	8	–0.199
Leeward Islands	5	0	5	0	0	0	–0.635

9 January 2007
Scorecard

Barbados; 247/4 (50 overs)	v	Trinidad and Tobago; 251/3 (41.3 overs)

Trinidad and Tobago won by 7 wickets
Desmond Haynes Oval, Bridgetown
Player of the match: Daren Ganga (T&T)

9 January 2007
Scorecard

Leeward Islands; 232/6 (50 overs)	v	Jamaica; 233/5 (49 overs)

Jamaica won by 5 wickets
St Mary's Park, Cayon
Player of the match: Omari Banks (Lee)

9 January 2007
Scorecard

Guyana; 254/7 (50 overs)	v	Windward Islands; 256/4 (50 overs)

Windward Islands won by 6 wickets
Tanteen Recreation Ground, St. George's
Player of the match: Liam Sebastien (Win)

17 January 2007
Scorecard

Leeward Islands; 226 (49.4 overs)	v	Barbados; 228/4 (45 overs)

Barbados won by 6 wickets
Desmond Haynes Oval, Bridgetown
Player of the match: Kevin Stoute (Bar)

17 January 2007
Scorecard

Guyana; 183 (48.1 overs)	v	Trinidad and Tobago; 185/5 (35 overs)

Trinidad and Tobago won by 5 wickets
Queen's Park Oval, Port of Spain
Player of the match: Kieron Pollard (T&T)

17 January 2007
Scorecard

Windward Islands; 161 (43.2 overs)	v	Jamaica; 165/5 (47.4 overs)

Jamaica won by 5 wickets
Beausejour Stadium, Gros Islet
Player of the match: David Bernard (Jam)

25 January 2007
Scorecard

Guyana; 163 (41 overs)	v	Jamaica; 123 (41.2 overs)

Guyana won by 40 runs
Alpart Sports Club Ground, Nain
Player of the match: Veerasammy Permaul (Guy)

25 January 2007
Scorecard

Leeward Islands; 176 (48.2 overs)	v	Trinidad and Tobago; 177/5 (36.2 overs)

Trinidad and Tobago won by 5 wickets
Shaw Park, Scarborough
Player of the match: Kieron Pollard (T&T)

25 January 2007
Scorecard

Barbados; 82/3 (9 overs)	v	Windward Islands

No result
Benjamin's Park, Portsmouth

2 February 2007
Scorecard

Leeward Islands; 233/8 (50 overs)	v	Guyana; 234/4 (46.2 overs)

Guyana won by 6 wickets
Albion Sports Complex, Albion
Player of the match: Narsingh Deonarine (Guy)

2 February 2007
Scorecard

Barbados; 284/6 (50 overs)	v	Jamaica; 280/9 (50 overs)

Barbados won by 4 runs
Kensington Park, Kingston

2 February 2007
Scorecard

Windward Islands; 234/8 (50 overs)	v	Trinidad and Tobago; 236/8 (42.3 overs)

Trinidad and Tobago won by 2 wickets
Wilson Road Recreation Ground, Penal
Player of the match: Ravi Rampaul (T&T)

10 February 2007
Scorecard

Guyana; 241/8 (48 overs)	v	Barbados; 244/4 (47.2 overs)

Barbados won by 6 wickets
Bourda, Georgetown
Player of the match: Ryan Hinds (Bar)

- The match was reduced to 48 overs per side before the start of play.

10 February 2007
Scorecard

Jamaica; 223 (48.4 overs)	v	Trinidad and Tobago; 225/8 (44.5 overs)

Trinidad and Tobago won by 2 wickets
Sabina Park, Kingston
Player of the match: Kieron Pollard (T&T)

10 February 2007
Scorecard

Leeward Islands; 203 (48.3 overs)	v	Windward Islands; 206/4 (42.4 overs)

Windward Islands won by 6 wickets
Carib Lumber Ball Park, Philipsburg
Player of the match: Andre Fletcher (Win)

== Finals ==
=== Semi-finals ===
15 February 2007
Scorecard

Guyana; 114 (38 overs)	v	Trinidad and Tobago; 109/5 (27.2 overs)

Trinidad and Tobago won by 5 wickets (D/L)
Arnos Vale Stadium, Kingstown
Player of the match: Rayad Emrit (T&T)

- Trinidad and Tobago's target was 109 runs in 42 overs.

16 February 2007
Scorecard

Barbados; 155 (47.2 overs)	v	Windward Islands; 159/7 (44.1 overs)

Windward Islands won by 3 wickets
Arnos Vale Stadium, Kingstown
Player of the match: Devon Smith (Win)

=== Final ===
28 October 2007
Scorecard

Trinidad and Tobago; 210/8 (50 overs)	v	Windward Islands; 205 (49.4 overs)

Trinidad and Tobago won by 5 runs
Arnos Vale Stadium, Kingstown
Player of the match: Sherwin Ganga (T&T)

== Statistics ==
=== Most runs ===
The top five run scorers (total runs) are included in this table.

Player	Team	Runs	Inns	Avg	Highest	100s	50s
Kieron Pollard	Trinidad and Tobago	261	7	43.50	87	0	2
Devon Smith	Windward Islands	258	4	86.00	81	0	3
Sylvester Joseph	Leeward Islands	237	5	79.00	100*	1	1
Floyd Reifer	Barbados	237	5	59.25	112	1	0
Narsingh Deonarine	Guyana	217	6	43.40	65*	0	2

Source: CricketArchive

=== Most wickets ===
The top five wicket takers are listed in this table, listed by wickets taken and then by bowling average.

Player	Team	Overs	Wkts	Ave	SR	Econ	BBI
Jermaine Lawson	Jamaica	40.0	13	14.15	18.46	4.60	5/66
Merv Dillon	Trinidad and Tobago	51.2	11	19.81	28.00	4.24	4/35
Ravi Rampaul	Trinidad and Tobago	54.4	10	21.70	32.80	3.96	4/53
Kieron Pollard	Trinidad and Tobago	27.0	8	15.75	20.25	4.66	4/32
Mervin Matthew	Windward Islands	41.3	8	19.62	31.12	3.78	3/23

Source: CricketArchive
