= 2005–06 KFC Cup =

Cricket tournament

- Dates: 3 – 16 October 2005
- Administrator: WICB
- Cricket format: List A (50 overs)
- Tournament format(s): Group stage, finals
- Host(s): Barbados; Guyana
- Champions: Guyana (9th title)
- Participants: 6
- Matches: 18
- Most runs: (Guyana) Ramnaresh Sarwan (462)
- Most wickets: (Barbados) Corey Collymore (15)

The 2005–06 KFC Cup was the 32nd edition of the Regional Super50, the domestic limited-overs cricket competition for the countries of the West Indies Cricket Board (WICB). The competition was the first to be sponsored by KFC, with a sponsorship contract only being signed after the opening round had already been played.

The six teams participating in the competition were Barbados, Guyana, Jamaica, the Leeward Islands, Trinidad and Tobago, and the Windward Islands. The round-robin stage was played in Barbados, with the semi-finals and final all played in Guyana, at Georgetown's Bourda. Guyana were undefeated in the round-robin, and eventually defeated Barbados in the final to win their ninth domestic one-day title. Guyanese batsman Ramnaresh Sarwan led the tournament in runs, while Barbadian fast bowler Corey Collymore took the most wickets.

== Squads ==
Barbados	Guyana	Jamaica
Courtney Browne (c); Sulieman Benn; Tino Best; Ian Bradshaw; Shirley Clarke; Corey Collymore; Fidel Edwards; Ryan Hinds; Alcino Holder; Martin Nurse; Floyd Reifer; Dale Richards; Dwayne Smith; Kurt Wilkinson	Shivnarine Chanderpaul (c); Krishna Arjune; Sewnarine Chattergoon; Derwin Christian; Esuan Crandon; Lennox Cush; Narsingh Deonarine; Assad Fudadin; Rayon Griffith; Reon King; Neil McGarrell; Mahendra Nagamootoo; Ryan Ramdass; Ramnaresh Sarwan	Wavell Hinds (c); Carlton Baugh; Alton Beckford; David Bernard; Gareth Breese; Danza Hyatt; Tamar Lambert; Xavier Marshall; Nikita Miller; Brenton Parchment; Daren Powell; Andrew Richardson; Marlon Samuels; Dwight Washington
Leeward Islands	Trinidad and Tobago	Windward Islands
Sylvester Joseph (c); Omari Banks; Wilden Cornwall; Shane Jeffers; Kerry Jeremy; Alderman Lesmond; Junie Mitchum; Runako Morton; Austin Richards; Curtis Roberts; Carl Simon; Gavin Tonge; Tonito Willett	Daren Ganga (c); Samuel Badree; Dwayne Bravo; Merv Dillon; Rayad Emrit; Sherwin Ganga; Sanjiv Gooljar; Richard Kelly; Gregory Mahabir; Ricardo Powell; Denesh Ramdin; Ravi Rampaul; Lendl Simmons; Rodney Sooklal	Rawl Lewis (c); Deighton Butler; Craig Emmanuel; Ronald Etienne; Sergio Fedee; Orlanzo Jackson; Alvin La Feuille; Garey Mathurin; Mervin Matthew; Junior Murray; Kenroy Peters; Darren Sammy; Liam Sebastien; Devon Smith

== Round-robin stage ==
Team	Pld	W	L	T	NR	BP	Pts	NRR
Guyana	5	4	0	1	0	2	20	+0.510
Barbados	5	3	2	0	0	0	12	+0.122
Windward Islands	5	3	2	0	0	0	12	+0.034
Leeward Islands	5	2	2	1	0	1	11	+0.184
Jamaica	5	2	3	0	0	1	9	–0.314
Trinidad and Tobago	5	0	5	0	0	0	0	–0.687

3 October 2005
Scorecard

Barbados; 243 (49.3 overs)	v	Guyana; 206/6 (44 overs)

Guyana won by 3 runs (D/L)
Mount Gay North Stars Cricket Ground, Crab Hill
Player of the match: Ramnaresh Sarwan (Guy)

- When rain stopped play, Guyana needed to have scored 204 runs to win.

3 October 2005
Scorecard

Jamaica; 145 (38.1 overs)	v	Leeward Islands; 146/1 (29.2 overs)

Leeward Islands won by 9 wickets
Banks Sports and Cultural Club, Wildey
Player of the match: Runako Morton (Lee)

3 October 2005
Scorecard

Windward Islands; 190/9 (50 overs)	v	Trinidad and Tobago; 176 (47 overs)

Windward Islands won by 14 runs
Windward Park, Lucas Street
Player of the match: Rawl Lewis (Win)

4 October 2005
Scorecard

Barbados; 267/6 (50 overs)	v	Trinidad and Tobago; 191/8 (40 overs)

Barbados won by 41 runs (D/L)
Banks Sports and Cultural Club, Wildey
Player of the match: Courtney Browne (Bar)

- Trinidad and Tobago's target was 233 runs in 40 overs.

4 October 2005
Scorecard

Guyana; 291/5 (50 overs)	v	Leeward Islands; 291/7 (50 overs)

Match tied
Windward Park, Lucas Street
Player of the match: Ramnaresh Sarwan (Guy)

4 October 2005
Scorecard

Jamaica; 254/8 (50 overs)	v	Windward Islands; 233/6 (40.1 overs)

Windward Islands won by 4 wickets (D/L)
Mount Gay North Stars Cricket Ground, Crab Hill
Player of the match: Rawl Lewis (Win)

- The Windward Islands' target was 230 runs in 43 overs.

6 October 2005
Scorecard

Barbados; 220 (48.4 overs)	v	Windward Islands; 219/9 (50 overs)

Barbados won by 1 run
Cable and Wireless Sports Club Ground, Wildey
Player of the match: Liam Sebastien (Win)

6 October 2005
Scorecard

Guyana; 219 (49.3 overs)	v	Jamaica; 212/7 (50 overs)

Guyana won by 7 runs
Police Sports Club Ground, Bridgetown
Player of the match: Mahendra Nagamootoo (Guy)

6 October 2005
Scorecard

Leeward Islands; 244/9 (50 overs)	v	Trinidad and Tobago; 242 (49.1 overs)

Leeward Islands won by 2 runs
Desmond Haynes Oval, Bridgetown
Player of the match: Runako Morton (Lee)

7 October 2005
Scorecard

Barbados; 229 (48.5 overs)	v	Leeward Islands; 212/9 (50 overs)

Barbados won by 17 runs
Police Sports Club Ground, Bridgetown
Player of the match: Corey Collymore (Bar)

7 October 2005
Scorecard

Guyana; 252/7 (43 overs)	v	Windward Islands; 197 (40.3 overs)

Guyana won by 55 runs
Desmond Haynes Oval, Bridgetown
Player of the match: Shivnarine Chanderpaul (Guy)

- The match was reduced to 43 overs per side before the start of play.

7 October 2005
Scorecard

Trinidad and Tobago; 101 (19.5 overs)	v	Jamaica; 104/4 (13.5 overs)

Jamaica won by 6 wickets
Cable and Wireless Sports Club Ground, Wildey
Player of the match: Danza Hyatt (Jam)

9 October 2005
Scorecard

Barbados; 208/8 (50 overs)	v	Jamaica; 209/4 (44.1 overs)

Jamaica won by 6 wickets
3Ws Oval, Cave Hill
Player of the match: Gareth Breese (Jam)

9 October 2005
Scorecard

Trinidad and Tobago; 172 (42 overs)	v	Jamaica; 174/2 (39.2 overs)

Guyana won by 8 wickets
Windward Park, Lucas Street
Player of the match: Sewnarine Chattergoon (Guy)

9 October 2005
Scorecard

Leeward Islands; 144 (38.2 overs)	v	Windward Islands; 145/4 (42.3 overs)

Windward Islands won by 6 wickets
Cable and Wireless Sports Club Ground, Wildey
Player of the match: Devon Smith (Win)

== Finals ==
=== Semi-finals ===
12 October 2005
Scorecard

Leeward Islands; 241/8 (50 overs)	v	Guyana; 245/3 (47.2 overs)

Guyana won by 7 wickets
Bourda, Georgetown
Player of the match: Ramnaresh Sarwan (Guy)

14 October 2005
Scorecard

Barbados; 270/7 (50 overs)	v	Windward Islands; 175/8 (38 overs)

Barbados won by 41 runs (D/L)
Bourda, Georgetown
Player of the match: Dwayne Smith (Bar)

- The Windward Islands' target was 217 runs in 38 overs.

=== Final ===
16 October 2005
Scorecard

Barbados; 249/8 (50 overs)	v	Guyana; 247/7 (49 overs)

Guyana won by 7 runs (D/L)
Bourda, Georgetown
Player of the match: Sewnarine Chattergoon (Guy)

- When rain stopped play Guyana needed to have scored 241 runs to win.

== Statistics ==
=== Most runs ===
The top five run scorers (total runs) are included in this table.

Player	Team	Runs	Inns	Avg	Highest	100s	50s
Ramnaresh Sarwan	Guyana	462	6	115.50	113*	3	2
Runako Morton	Leeward Islands	344	6	68.80	87*	0	4
Sewnarine Chattergoon	Guyana	325	7	54.16	119	1	2
Dwayne Smith	Barbados	220	7	31.42	96	0	2
Brenton Parchment	Jamaica	218	5	43.60	75	0	2

Source: CricketArchive

=== Most wickets ===
The top five wicket takers are listed in this table, listed by wickets taken and then by bowling average.

Player	Team	Overs	Wkts	Ave	SR	Econ	BBI
Corey Collymore	Barbados	51.0	15	12.46	20.40	3.66	5/27
Darren Sammy	Windward Islands	48.0	12	17.33	24.00	4.33	4/49
Gavin Tonge	Leeward Islands	49.5	12	22.50	24.91	5.41	3/50
Mahendra Nagamootoo	Guyana	64.0	12	24.66	32.00	4.62	3/53
Rawl Lewis	Windward Islands	49.0	11	18.36	26.72	4.12	3/23

Source: CricketArchive
