= West Indies A cricket team in Sri Lanka in 2005 =

Cricket team tour

Sri Lanka A

Captain
Russel Arnold
Squad
Avishka Gunawardene
Ian Daniel
Michael Vandort
Jehan Mubarak
Malintha Gajanayake
Gayan Wijekoon
+Prasanna Jayawardene
Dilhara Fernando
Malinga Bandara
Sajeewa Weerakoon
Dilhara Loku Hettige
Suraj Mohamed
Ruchira Perera

West Indies A

Captain
Daren Ganga Squad
Carlton Baugh
Tino Best
Narsingh Deonarine
Jermaine Lawson
Xavier Marshall
Nikita Miller
Dave Mohammed
Runako Morton
Ryan Ramdass
Marlon Samuels
Dwayne Smith
Dwight Washington
David Bernard
Kerry Jeremy
Called up after 2nd "Test"
Lendl Simmons
Tishan Maraj
David Bernard
Darren Sammy
Richard Kelly
Kenroy Peters
Sewnarine Chattergoon
Jean Paul

West Indies A toured Sri Lanka for a cricket tournament between 23 June and 19 July 2005. They played three unofficial four-day "Tests" and five unofficial "ODIs". The plans for the tour were only confirmed in mid-June as a result of a dispute over sponsorship between the West Indies Cricket Association and its players. The row continued between the Association and the senior West Indian players, though, which led to the Association asking all West Indies A players whether they would make themselves available for the Test tour immediately following the A tour. On 28 June it was announced that they had unanimously declined the request. However, that unanimous agreement vanished in the coming days, and several players were called up from the A squad to the main squad – resulting in the A squad needing more players. Twenty players eventually turned out for the West Indies A squad. Both the first-class and one-day series were alive until the very last match, though. West Indies A took a 57-run victory in the first "Test" match, taking the last five wickets of that game for three runs, but crashed to a humbling innings defeat in the second. Sri Lanka A won the series 2–1 thanks to a four-wicket win in the last match. In the one-dayers, West Indies could have forced a drawn series if they had managed to win the last game, but Sri Lanka's bowling undid them and they lost the series 3–1.

== Sri Lanka A v West Indies A – First unofficial "Test" (23–26 June) ==
West Indies A beat Sri Lanka A by 57 runs

Xavier Marshall with 82 and Daren Ganga with 99 – both with ODIs for West Indies – lifted West Indies A to 228 for 2, but there was little resistance after that, and Sajeewa Weerakoon could take six wickets with his left-arm spin. However, Jermaine Lawson and Tino Best put pressure on with good and lucky fast bowling, as only wicket-keeper Prasanna Jayawardene passed fifty runs. The touring team had a slender lead of 37, but batting with more composure the second time around, Ryan Ramdass and Carlton Baugh, who both made fifties, ensured that the visitors would have to chase 316. They were well on their way – despite two wickets from Best early on, and Avishka Gunawardene retiring hurt – with 126 for 2 at stumps on day 3. And they would have fancied their chances with the hard-hitting Gunawardene at the crease, and the score 255 for 5. Then the wheels fell off – the last five wickets went for three runs, and the West Indians took the first of the three-game series.

== Sri Lanka A v West Indies A – Second unofficial "Test" (29 June – 1 July) ==
Sri Lanka A beat West Indies A by an innings and 16 runs

Sri Lanka A levelled the series with a comprehensive win over West Indies A. However, the main action was happening off the field, as the West Indies Cricket Board's dispute with its senior players over sponsorship issues caused them to drop key players from the Test squad. Only six first-choice players were named in the Test squad, with West Indies A team members Tino Best, Kerry Jeremy, Xavier Marshall, Ryan Ramdass, Runako Morton, Dwayne Smith, Narsingh Deonarine and Jermaine Lawson being named in the side. Controversy surrounds how much pressure the WICB brought to bear on the A team members, but the situation certainly did not help the team concentrate on the game. On the first day of the match, West Indies A batted first, making 253 as only Runako Morton's 114 saved them from humiliation. In reply, Russel Arnold, with 159 was the mainstay of the Sri Lankan innings as they made 417 to establish a lead of 164. Sajeewa Weerakoon then took 6 for 56 as West Indies A capitulated for 148.

== Sri Lanka A v West Indies A – Third unofficial "Test" (7–10 July) ==
Sri Lanka A beat West Indies A by four wickets

A new-look West Indies A were close to giving Sri Lanka A a fight, but Sri Lanka A still won the match and the "Test" series. Daren Ganga made 109 for West Indies A, lifting them to 324 in total, before Dwayne Washington took three for 31 as Sri Lanka A were all out, twelve runs behind. However, the match was running out of time, and West Indies A did not seem all that keen on trying to win it. After wicket-keeper Lendl Simmons departed for 52, a total of 104 runs were hit in 55 overs – Darren Sammy making 40 not out off 166 balls. Yet, a marathon bowling effort from left-arm spinner Sajeewa Weerakoon yielded six wickets for 57 runs, and West Indies A were all out for 205 – setting a target of 218 with around 40 overs remaining. Sri Lanka A went for it positively, hitting at nearly exactly a run a ball, with Avishka Gunawardene top scoring with 49. Despite three quick wickets from Sammy to reduce Sri Lanka A to 186 for 6, that was as close as the Caribbean tourists got, as Dilhara Lokuhettige made 22 not out and guided the hosts to the target.

== Sri Lanka A v West Indies A – First unofficial "ODI" (13 July) ==
Sri Lanka A tied with West Indies A (D/L method)

An entertaining one-day game between the two sides ended in a tie – West Indies A reaching the Duckworth/Lewis target. Earlier, Sri Lanka A had enlisted the help of Saman Jayantha who made 73, while off-spinner Dave Mohammed took four for 44. A revised target of 201 in 41 overs looked tricky for the West Indies, as Dilhara Loku Hettige took three early wickets and with some help had the tourists tied down on 99 for 6, but Carlton Baugh and Mohammed rescued them to 200 for 6 after 41 overs.

== Sri Lanka A v West Indies A – Second unofficial "ODI" (14 July) ==
Sri Lanka A beat West Indies A by 15 runs (D/L method)

Marlon Samuels (100) and David Bernard (66) were the mainstays of the West Indian innings after they were put into bat by Sri Lanka. The West Indians scored well, making their way to 273 for 9 off their 50 overs. Whilst Sri Lanka lost the occasional wicket, they were able to put on partnerships of 31, 41, 51 and 9 before Arnold and Jayawardene got together. 102 runs later the partnership was broken and Sri Lanka moved to 243 for 5 when rain brought an end to the match after 44 overs. This left the hosts comfortable winners on the Duckworth–Lewis method.

== Sri Lanka A v West Indies A – Third unofficial "ODI" (16 July) ==
Sri Lanka A beat West Indies A by seven wickets

The West Indians were put into bat at Moratuwa as rain reduced the match to a 35-over-a-side affair. West Indies A started strongly, reaching 71 for 1 before wickets started to tumble when Chattergoon (38) fell. Ganga (52), who came in first wicket down, anchored the innings, and was eighth man out. But no-one was able to stay with him for long as the West Indies were all out for 168 with 19 balls still to go. Sri Lanka encountered few difficulties in reaching their target, which they did with eleven balls and seven wickets spare. However, they did have an early wobble as Gunawardene, Jayantha and Kalavitagoda were all out with the score still on 39. Then Tharanga (74*) and Arnold (39*) saw the hosts home to a result that means Sri Lanka cannot lose the series.

== Sri Lanka A v West Indies A – Fourth unofficial "ODI" (18 July) ==
West Indies A beat Sri Lanka A by eight wickets

The tourists pegged Sri Lanka A back to 1–2 in the series after bowling them out for 164 and then batting well to get to the total. Richard Kelly and Darren Sammy took four early wickets as Sri Lanka went from 20 for 0 to 26 for 4, and after Arnold and Jayawardene rebuilt, Lendl Simmons and David Bernard grabbed a wicket each to set Sri Lanka A further back. Kelly took a further two wickets to finish with four for 38, and Sri Lanka A finished on 164 all out. Lendl Simmons then cracked the highest score of the day by far, making 97 off 102 balls, and West Indies A took a comprehensive eight-wicket win.

== Sri Lanka A v West Indies A – Fifth unofficial "ODI" (19 July) ==
Sri Lanka A beat West Indies A by 72 runs

Sri Lanka A secured the series thanks to 69 not out from Russel Arnold who hit runs quickly on a difficult pitch at Nondescripts Cricket Club Ground. He was well helped by Jayawardene, as the pair took plenty of runs off Darren Sammy and Dwight Washington. Despite four for 23 from spinner Dave Mohammed, Sri Lanka A made 227, and all their bowlers proceeded to take wickets as West Indies rolled over for 155. Dave Mohammed was the star with the bat as well, making 43, while Dave Bernard recorded a frustrating 12 off 41 balls.
