= List of international cricket centuries by Jacques Kallis =

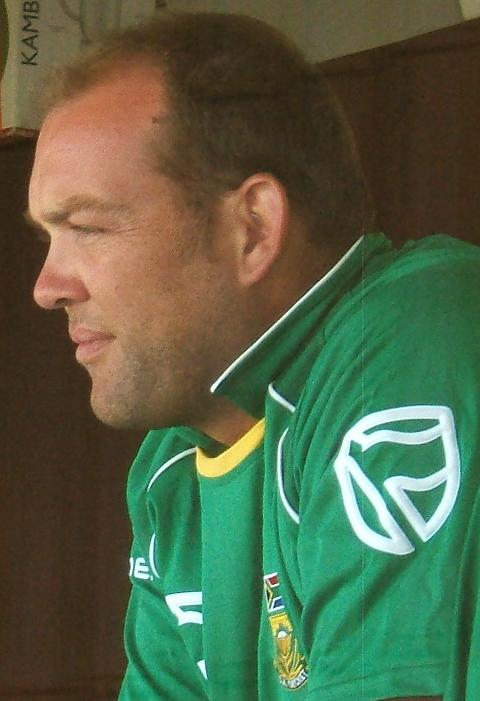
Jacques Kallis has scored more international centuries than any other South African player.

Jacques Kallis is a South African cricketer who plays as an all-rounder. He has been described as "the greatest cricketer ever", and is considered one of the best all-rounders of all time, along with Sir Garfield Sobers. He has scored 45 centuries (100 or more runs in a single innings) in Test cricket, the most by any South African, and 17 centuries in One Day International (ODI) matches. He leads all South African batsmen in runs in both Test and ODI cricket.

Kallis made his Test debut against England in December 1995. He scored his maiden Test century just over two years later, in his seventh Test match, making 101 against Australia. In the 2003–04 series against the West Indies, Kallis scored a century in each of the four Test matches, becoming the first cricketer to pass 100 in every match of a series lasting more than three Tests. His feat also marked the first time a South African player scored centuries in four consecutive Test matches, a run he extended in his next match, scoring 150 not out against New Zealand, to become the second player, after Sir Donald Bradman, to pass 100 in five consecutive Tests. Kallis passed Gary Kirsten as South Africa's leading run-scorer in Test cricket when he reached his 22nd century during the 2004–05 tour of the West Indies. His achievements during the 2004–05 and 2005 cricket seasons, during which time he scored six Test centuries, resulted in him being named as Test Player of the Year by the International Cricket Council (ICC). In October 2007 he became the fourth South African to reach 100 in both innings of a Test match when he did so against Pakistan. He scored a century in each of the following three Tests, tallying five centuries in four Test matches. In doing so, he joined Bradman, Matthew Hayden and Ken Barrington as one of just four players to have scored centuries in four consecutive Test matches on two occasions. Kallis scored his first double century in Test cricket in December 2010, scoring an unbeaten 201 in the first Test against India. Prior to his double century, Kallis had been the only player in the top 15 Test run-scorers not to have reached 200. Later during the same series, Kallis struck centuries in both innings of a match for the second time in his career, becoming the first South African to achieve the feat on two occasions. He reached his second double century, and his highest score, in 2012 against Sri Lanka, making 224.

In ODI cricket, Kallis scored his maiden century in January 1998, totalling 111 against New Zealand. He reached his highest total in ODIs against the West Indies in February 2004, scoring 139. He generally scores at slower than one run per delivery, but does score more quickly on occasions on which he reaches a century, averaging 90.24 runs per hundred balls, rather than 72.77 when he scores less than 100. His highest strike-rate when scoring a century was 117.43, achieved when he scored 128 not out against the Netherlands during the 2007 Cricket World Cup. He is the only South African to have scored over 10,000 runs in ODI cricket, while his 17 ODI centuries rank him second behind the 21 scored by Herschelle Gibbs among his countrymen.

== Key ==
* – Remained not out
† – Man of the match
‡ – Captain of South Africa in that match

== Test centuries ==
Test centuries scored by Kallis
No.	Score	Against	Pos.	Inn.	Test	Venue	H/A/N	Date	Result	Ref
1	101 †	Australia	3	4	1/3	Melbourne Cricket Ground, Melbourne	Away	26 December 1997	Drawn	
2	132 †	England	3	1	3/5	Old Trafford, Manchester	Away	2 June 1998	Drawn	
3	110 †	West Indies	3	1	4/5	Newlands Cricket Ground, Cape Town	Home	2 January 1999	Won	
4	148*	New Zealand	3	2	2/3	Jade Stadium, Christchurch	Away	11 March 1999	Drawn	
5	115	Zimbabwe	3	2	2/2	Harare Sports Club, Harare	Away	11 November 1999	Won	
6	105	England	3	2	4/5	Newlands, Cape Town	Home	2 January 2000	Won	
7	160 †	New Zealand	3	1	1/3	Goodyear Park, Bloemfontein	Home	17 November 2000	Won	
8	157*	Zimbabwe	3	1	1/2	Harare Sports Club, Harare	Away	7 September 2001	Won	
9	189* †	Zimbabwe	3	2	2/2	Queens Sports Club, Bulawayo	Away	14 September 2001	Drawn	
10	139* †	Bangladesh	4	2	2/2	North West Cricket Stadium, Potchefstroom	Home	25 October 2002	Won	
11	105 †	Pakistan	4	1	1/2	Kingsmead Cricket Ground, Durban	Home	26 December 2002	Won	
12	158	West Indies	4	1	1/4	New Wanderers Stadium, Johannesburg	Home	12 December 2003	Won	
13	177 †	West Indies	4	2	2/4	Kingsmead Cricket Ground, Durban	Home	26 December 2003	Won	
14	130* †	West Indies	4	3	3/4	Newlands Cricket Ground, Cape Town	Home	2 January 2004	Drawn	
15	130*	West Indies	4	1	4/4	SuperSport Park, Centurion	Home	16 January 2004	Won	
16	150* †	New Zealand	4	3	1/3	Westpac Park, Hamilton	Away	10 March 2004	Drawn	
17	121	India	4	1	2/2	Eden Gardens, Kolkata	Away	28 November 2004	Lost	
18	162 †	England	4	2	2/5	Kingsmead Cricket Ground, Durban	Home	26 December 2004	Drawn	
19	149 †	England	4	1	3/5	Newlands Cricket Ground, Cape Town	Home	2 January 2005	Won	
20	136*	England	4	3	5/5	SuperSport Park, Centurion	Home	21 January 2005	Drawn	
21	109*	West Indies	4	3	1/4	Bourda, Georgetown	Away	31 March 2005	Drawn	
22	147	West Indies	4	1	4/4	Antigua Recreation Ground, St. John's	Away	29 April 2005	Drawn	
23	111	Australia	4	1	3/3	Sydney Cricket Ground, Sydney	Away	2 January 2006	Lost	
24	114	Australia	4	2	2/3	Kingsmead Cricket Ground, Durban	Home	24 March 2006	Lost	
25	155 †	Pakistan	4	1	1/2	National Stadium, Karachi	Away	1 October 2007	Won	
26	100* †	Pakistan	4	3	1/2	National Stadium, Karachi	Away	1 October 2007	Won	
27	107* †	Pakistan	4	3	2/2	Gaddafi Stadium, Lahore	Away	8 October 2007	Drawn	
28	186	New Zealand	4	3	1/2	New Wanderers Stadium, Johannesburg	Home	8 November 2007	Won	
29	131	New Zealand	4	2	2/2	SuperSport Park, Centurion	Home	16 November 2007	Won	
30	132	India	4	2	2/3	Sardar Patel Stadium, Ahmedabad	Away	3 April 2008	Won	
31	102 ‡	Australia	4	2	3/3	Newlands, Cape Town	Home	19 March 2009	Won	
32	120	England	4	1	1/4	SuperSport Park, Centurion	Home	16 December 2009	Drawn	
33	108	England	4	1	3/4	Newlands Cricket Ground, Cape Town	Home	3 January 2010	Drawn	
34	173	India	4	1	1/2	Vidarbha Cricket Association Stadium, Nagpur	Away	6 February 2010	Won	
35	110	West Indies	4	1	2/3	Warner Park, Basseterre	Away	18 June 2010	Drawn	
36	135*	Pakistan	4	3	1/2	Dubai International Cricket Stadium, Dubai	Neutral	12 November 2010	Drawn	
37	105 †	Pakistan	4	1	2/2	Sheikh Zayed Cricket Stadium, Abu Dhabi	Neutral	20 November 2010	Drawn	
38	201* †	India	4	2	1/3	SuperSport Park, Centurion	Home	16 December 2010	Won	
39	161 †	India	4	1	3/3	Newlands Cricket Ground, Cape Town	Home	2 January 2011	Drawn	
40	109* †	India	5	3	3/3	Newlands Cricket Ground, Cape Town	Home	2 January 2011	Drawn	
41	224	Sri Lanka	4	1	3/3	Newlands Cricket Ground, Cape Town	Home	3 January 2012	Won	
42	113	New Zealand	4	2	1/3	University Oval, Dunedin	Away	10 March 2012	Drawn	
43	182*	England	4	2	1/3	The Oval, London	Away	22 July 2012	Won	
44	147	Australia	4	1	1/3	The Gabba, Brisbane	Away	11 November 2012	Drawn	
45	115	India	4	2	2/2	Kingsmead Cricket Ground, Durban	Home	29 December 2013	Won	

== ODI centuries ==
ODI centuries scored by Kallis
No.	Score	Against	Pos.	Inn.	S/R	Venue	H/A/N	Date	Result	Ref
1	111 †	New Zealand	3	1	79.28	WACA Ground, Perth	Neutral	16 January 1998	Won	
2	109* †	Pakistan	5	1	95.61	Kingsmead Cricket Ground, Durban	Home	3 April 1998	Won	
3	113* †	Sri Lanka	5	1	113.00	Bangabandhu National Stadium, Dhaka	Neutral	30 October 1998	Won	
4	100	New Zealand	3	1	85.47	Carisbrook, Dunedin	Away	14 February 1999	Lost	
5	100	New Zealand	4	1	80.00	Eden Park, Auckland	Away	27 March 1999	Won	
6	100* †	Sri Lanka	3	2	71.94	Boland Bank Park, Paarl	Home	9 January 2001	Won	
7	107 †	West Indies	3	1	99.07	Queen's Park, St. George's	Away	5 May 2001	Won	
8	104* †	Australia	3	2	86.66	WACA Ground, Perth	Away	3 February 2002	Lost	
9	107	England	3	1	80.45	The Oval, London	Away	28 June 2003	Lost	
10	125* †	Zimbabwe	3	1	85.03	St Lawrence Ground, Canterbury	Neutral	29 June 2003	Won	
11	109* †	West Indies	4	1	115.95	Newlands Cricket Ground, Cape Town	Home	25 January 2004	Won	
12	139 †	West Indies	3	2	97.88	New Wanderers Stadium, Johannesburg	Home	4 February 2004	Won	
13	101	Sri Lanka	3	2	79.52	Sinhalese Sports Club Ground, Colombo	Away	31 August 2004	Lost	
14	119* †	India	3	1	74.37	Kingsmead Cricket Ground, Durban	Home	11 November 2006	Won	
15	128*	Netherlands	3	1	117.43	Warner Park, Basseterre	Neutral	16 March 2007	Won	
16	121* †	West Indies	3	2	90.97	St George's Park Cricket Ground, Port Elizabeth	Home	27 January 2008	Won	
17	104* ‡	India	3	1	110.63	Sardar Patel Stadium, Ahmedabad	Away	27 February 2010	Won	
