= Shaw Park, Scarborough =

Cricket and football ground in Scarborough, Trinidad and Tobago

Shaw Park
- Interactive map of Shaw Park

Ground information
- Location: Scarborough, Trinidad and Tobago
- Country: Trinidad and Tobago
- Coordinates: 11.1754°N 60.7482°W
- Establishment: c. 1957

Team information
Trinidad and Tobago	(1983/84–2015/16)
- As of 17 February 2022; Source: Ground profile

Shaw Park is a cricket and football ground in Scarborough, Trinidad and Tobago.

== History ==
Shaw Park is located on the island of Tobago, adjacent to the ocean. Development as a cricket venue began in 1958, with the construction of a pavilion. The Park first played host to the Tinidad and Tobago cricket team in a List A one-day match against Jamaica in the 1983–84 Geddes Grant/Harrison Line Trophy. Trinidad played two further one-day matches there in competition in the proceeding two years. Following these matches, there was a gap of sixteen years before Trinidad and Tobago returned to the ground to play a first-class fixture against a touring Bangladesh A side, who were guests in the 2001-02 Busta Cup. They played a further three first-class matches at the Park, against Kenya, Jamaica, and the Windward Islands in 2004, 2005 and 2006 respectively; a first-class match scheduled to be played there between West Indies A and the touring Sri Lankans in 2008 was cancelled due to flight problems. One-day cricket returned to the Park in the 2006–07 KFC Cup, with Trinidad and Tobago playing the Leeward Islands, before hosting four matches in the 2013–14, 2014–15, and 2015–16 Regional Super50 tournaments.

As a football venue, Shaw Park played host to an international friendly between Trinidad and Tobago and Haiti in 2005, which the visitors won 1–0.

== Records ==
=== First-class ===
- Highest team total: 392 for 9 declared by Trinidad and Tobago v Jamaica, 2004–05
- Lowest team total: 88 all out by Trinidad and Tobago v Windward Islands, 2005–06
- Highest individual innings: 200 by Lendl Simmons for Trinidad and Tobago v Jamaica, 2004–05
- Best bowling in an innings: 6-72 by Dave Mohammed for Trinidad and Tobago v Windward Islands, 2005–06
- Best bowling in a match: 11-46 by Dave Mohammed, as above

=== List A ===
- Highest team total: 374 for 6 (50 overs) by Windward Islands v Barbados, 2014–15
- Lowest team total: 97 for 7 (21 overs) by West Indies under-19's v Trinidad and Tobago, 2014–15 (Note: The match was reduced to 21 overs per side.)
- Highest individual innings: 177 by Johnson Charles for Windward Islands v Barbados, 2014–15
- Best bowling in an innings: 4 for 19 by Sunil Narine for Trinidad and Tobago v Leeward Islands, 2013–14

== See also ==
- List of cricket grounds in the West Indies
