= West Indian cricket team in South Africa in 2003–04 =

Men's cricket tour

	South Africa	West Indies
- Dates: 3 December 2003 – 4 February 2004
Captains	GC Smith	BC Lara

Test series
- Result: South Africa won the 4-match series 3–0
Most runs	JH Kallis (712)	BC Lara (531)
Most wickets	M Ntini (29)	FH Edwards (8)
- Player of the series: M Ntini (SA)

One Day International series
- Results: South Africa won the 5-match series 3–1
Most runs	JH Kallis (361)	S Chanderpaul (210)
Most wickets	SM Pollock (8)	CD Collymore (12)
- Player of the series: JH Kallis (SA)

The West Indies cricket team toured South Africa during the 2003–04 season and played a four-match Test series and a five-match One Day International series against the South Africa national cricket team, as well as five tour matches. This tour immediately followed a tour of Zimbabwe.

West Indies was led in the Test and ODI series by Brian Lara while South Africa was led by Graeme Smith.

South Africa won the Test series 3–0 and the ODI series 3–1. Jacques Kallis of South Africa emerged as the top run-scorer in the Test series with 712 runs, with an average of 178.00, followed by Herschelle Gibbs with 583 runs at an average of 116.60. Makhaya Ntini finished the series as top wicket-taker with 29 wickets, followed by André Nel with 22 and Shaun Pollock with 16. Ntini was named "man of the Test series".

== Squads ==
Tests		ODIs	
South Africa	West Indies	South Africa	West Indies
Graeme Smith (c); Mark Boucher (wk); Paul Adams (2nd-4th Tests); Herschelle Gibbs; Andrew Hall; Jacques Kallis; Gary Kirsten (2nd-4th Tests); Garnett Kruger (1st Test only); Neil McKenzie; Makhaya Ntini; André Nel; Robin Peterson (1st Test only); Shaun Pollock; Jacques Rudolph; Martin van Jaarsveld	Brian Lara (c); ~~Omari Banks~~; Carlton Baugh (wk); Shivnarine Chanderpaul; Corey Collymore; Mervyn Dillon; Vasbert Drakes; Fidel Edwards; Daren Ganga; Chris Gayle; Wavell Hinds; Ridley Jacobs (wk); Ravi Rampaul; ~~Marlon Samuels~~; Ramnaresh Sarwan; ~~Jerome Taylor~~	Graeme Smith (c); Mark Boucher (wk); Boeta Dippenaar; Herschelle Gibbs; Jacques Kallis; Lance Klusener; Albie Morkel; Makhaya Ntini; André Nel; Robin Peterson; Shaun Pollock; Jacques Rudolph; Morné van Wyk	Brian Lara (c); Ramnaresh Sarwan; Chris Gayle; Ridley Jacobs (wk); Shivnarine Chanderpaul; Dwayne Smith; Vasbert Drakes; Ravi Rampaul; Mervyn Dillon; Fidel Edwards; Corey Collymore; Ryan Hurley; Ian Bradshaw; Ricardo Powell; Kurt Wilkinson

Jerome Taylor, Marlon Samuels, and Omari Banks returned home injured prior to the start of the Test series and were replaced by Dave Mohammed, Dwayne Smith, and Adam Sanford respectively.

== Test matches ==
=== 1st Test ===
12–16 December 2003
Scorecard

South Africa	v	West Indies
561 (148.4 overs); JH Kallis 158 (297); WW Hinds 3/79 (17.4 overs)		410 (133.5 overs); BC Lara 202 (274); M Ntini 5/94 (32 overs)
226/6d (63 overs); GC Smith 44 (70); JA Rudolph 44 (116); JH Kallis 44 (72); WW Hinds 2/55 (11 overs)		188 (51 overs); S Chanderpaul 74 (91); SM Pollock 4/31 (17 overs)

South Africa won by 189 runs
New Wanderers, Johannesburg
Umpires: DB Hair (AUS) and SJA Taufel (AUS)
Player of the match: M Ntini (SA)

- South Africa won the toss and elected to bat.

=== 2nd Test ===
26–29 December 2003
Scorecard

West Indies	v	South Africa
264 (77.5 overs); BC Lara 72 (111); M Ntini 5/66 (25.5 overs)		658/9d (166.2 overs); JH Kallis 177 (344); A Sanford 3/170 (38.2 overs)
329 (113 overs); RR Sarwan 114 (225); A Nel 3/68 (18 overs)

South Africa won by an innings and 65 runs
Kingsmead Cricket Ground, Durban
Umpires: DB Hair (AUS) and SJA Taufel (AUS)
Player of the match: JH Kallis (SA)

- South Africa won the toss and elected to field.
- The match was scheduled for five days but completed in four.

=== 3rd Test ===
2–6 January 2004
Scorecard

South Africa	v	West Indies
532 (145 overs); MV Boucher 122* (173); A Sanford 4/132 (37 overs)		427 (112.1 overs); CH Gayle 116 (120); A Nel 5/87 (28.1 overs)
335/3d (76 overs); HH Gibbs 142 (223); RR Sarwan 1/69 (19 overs)		354/5 (100 overs); DR Smith 105* (105); M Ntini 3/82 (21 overs)

Match drawn
Newlands Cricket Ground, Cape Town
Umpires: DJ Harper (SA) and S Venkataraghavan (IND)
Player of the match: JH Kallis (SA)

- South Africa won the toss and elected to bat.
- D Mohammed and DR Smith (both WI) made their Test debuts.

=== 4th Test ===
16–20 January 2004
Scorecard

South Africa	v	West Indies
604/6d (158 overs); HH Gibbs 192 (335); RR Sarwan 2/55 (14 overs)		301 (82.2 overs); CH Gayle 77 (113); M Ntini 5/49 (20 overs)
46/0 (3.4 overs); GC Smith 23* (175)		348 (106.4 overs) (f/o); RR Sarwan 119 (273); SM Pollock 4/69 (32 overs)

South Africa won by 10 wickets
Centurion Park, Centurion, Gauteng
Umpires: DR Shepherd (ENG) and S Venkataraghavan (IND)
Player of the match: HH Gibbs (SA)

- West Indies won the toss and elected to field.

== ODI series summary ==
=== 1st ODI ===
25 January 2004 (D/N)
Scorecard

South Africa; 263/4 (50 overs)	v	West Indies; 54 (23.2 overs)
JH Kallis 109* (94); RO Hurley 1/39 (10 overs)		S Chanderpaul 14 (34); L Klusener 3/9 (5.2 overs)

South Africa won by 209 runs
Newlands Cricket Ground, Cape Town
Umpires: DB Hair (AUS) and IL Howell (SA)
Player of the match: JH Kallis (SA)

- South Africa won the toss and elected to bat.
- DR Smith (WI) made his ODI debut.

=== 2nd ODI ===
28 January 2004 (D/N)
Scorecard

South Africa; 179/7 (50 overs)	v	West Indies; 163 (42.4 overs)
HH Dippenaar 83 (123); CD Collymore 3/25 (10 overs)		DR Smith 24 (34); R Rampaul 24 (34); SM Pollock 4/26 (10 overs)

South Africa won by 16 runs
St George's Park Cricket Ground, Port Elizabeth
Umpires: Aleem Dar (PAK) and BG Jerling (SA)
Player of the match: HH Dippenaar (SA)

- South Africa won the toss and elected to bat.

=== 3rd ODI ===
30 January 2004 (D/N)
Scorecard

West Indies; 147/8 (40 overs)	v	South Africa; 15/1 (5 overs)
RL Powell 50 (71); JH Kallis 3/8 (3 overs)		HH Gibbs 7* (11); M Dillon 1/4 (3 overs)

No result
Kingsmead Cricket Ground, Durban
Umpires: DB Hair (AUS) and IL Howell (SA)

- West Indies won the toss and elected to bat.
- The match was reduced to 40 overs per side. South Africa's target was 169 runs.

=== 4th ODI ===
1 February 2004
Scorecard

South Africa; 297/4 (50 overs)	v	West Indies; 300/3 (45 overs)
JH Kallis 95* (97); RR Sarwan 1/15 (2 overs)		S Chanderpaul 92 (75); SM Pollock 2/40 (10 overs)

West Indies won by 7 wickets
Centurion Park, Centurion, Gauteng
Umpires: Aleem Dar (PAK) and BG Jerling (SA)
Player of the match: S Chanderpaul (WI)

- South Africa won the toss and elected to bat.

=== 5th ODI ===
4 February 2004 (D/N)
Scorecard

West Indies; 304/2 (50 overs)	v	South Africa; 310/6 (49.4 overs)
CH Gayle 152* (153); L Klusener 1/42 (8 overs)		JH Kallis 139 (142); R Rampaul 2/56 (10 overs)

South Africa won by 4 wickets
New Wanderers, Johannesburg
Umpires: DB Hair (AUS) and IL Howell (SA)
Player of the match: JH Kallis (SA)

- West Indies won the toss and elected to bat.
