= Hyron =

Hyron is a given name. It may refer to:

- Hyron Andrews (born 1995), South African rugby union player
- Hyron Fenton (born 1987), birth name of the artist Hyro the Hero
- Hyron Shallow (born 1982), West Indies cricketer from Saint Vincent and the Grenadines)
- Hyron Spinrad (1934–2015), American astronomer
