= Police Sports Club Ground =

Cricket ground in Highland, Barbados

- Weymouth Playing Field
- Interactive map of Police Sports Club Ground

Ground information
- Location: Weymouth, Bridgetown, Barbados
- Country: Barbados
- Coordinates: 13.1019°N 59.6082°W
- Establishment: 1944

Team information
| Barbados | (2005/06–2008/09) |
- As of 24 April 2022; Source: Ground profile

The Police Sports Club Ground (also known as Weymouth Playing Field) is a cricket ground in Bridgetown, Barbados.

== History ==
Plans were made to establish cricket fields at Weymouth in 1941, with them being completed by 1944. The ground has been used by the Police Sports Club, which is affiliated to the Barbados Police Service. Two List A one-day matches were held there in the 2005–06 KFC Cup between Guyana and Jamaica, and Barbados and the Leeward Islands. One first-class cricket match has been played at the ground, with Barbados playing Trinidad and Tobago in the 2008–09 Regional Four Day Competition, which was drawn. Performances of note in the match included a century (113) by Barbadian Dale Richards, and a five wicket haul (5 for 40) by Trinidadian Sherwin Ganga.

== Records ==
=== List A ===
- Highest team total: 229 all out (48.5 overs) by Barbados v Leeward Islands, 2005–06
- Lowest team total: 212 for 9 (50 overs) by Jamaica v Guyana, 2005–06
- Highest individual innings: 91 by Marlon Samuels for Jamaica v Guyana, 2005–06
- Best bowling in an innings: 5-27 by Corey Collymore for Barbados v Leeward Islands, 2005–06

== See also ==
- List of cricket grounds in the West Indies
