= Ezekiel Francis =

Dominican cricketer (born 1985)

Personal information
- Born: 23 May 1985 (age 41); Dominica
- Batting: Left-handed

Domestic team information
- Years: Team
- 2005–2007: Windward Islands
- Source: CricketArchive, 3 August 2016

Ezekiel Francis (born 23 May 1985) is a Dominican cricketer who has represented the Windward Islands in West Indian domestic cricket. He plays as a left-handed middle-order batsman.

Francis made his first-class debut for the Windwards in March 2005, aged 19, playing against Guyana in the 2004–05 Carib Beer Cup. In 2006, he represented the Dominican national team in the Stanford 20/20 competition (where matches held full Twenty20 status), playing a single game against Grenada. In the 2006–07 KFC Cup, Francis appeared in four of his team's seven matches, including the semi-final and final. His best performance came in the first match, when he scored 36 against Trinidad and Tobago. In between, he made a second first-class appearance, against the Leeward Islands.
