= Weymouth, Barbados =

Neighbourhood of Bridgetown, Barbados

Weymouth
- Neighbourhood
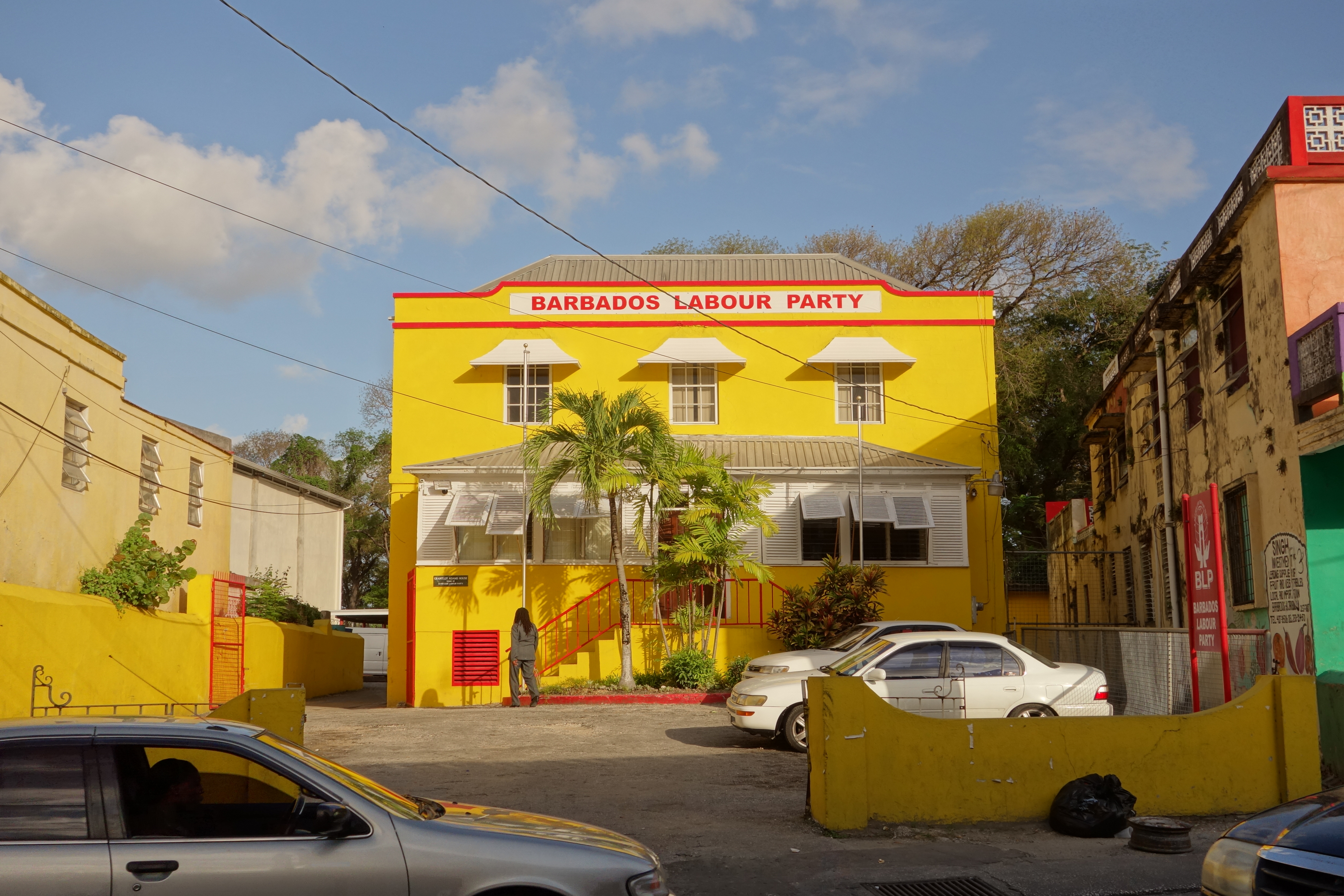
- Grantley Adams House, Barbados Labour Party Headquarters

- Location of Weymouth in Barbados
- Coordinates: 13°6′9.53″N 59°36′37.41″W
- Country: Barbados
- Parish: Saint Michael

Weymouth is a historic neighbourhood in Bridgetown, the capital and largest city of Barbados.

== History ==
The neighbourhood is named for the English town of Weymouth, Dorset.

== Notable buildings ==
- Grantley Adams House
- Weymouth Corporate Centre, Barbados Revenue Authority

== Sports ==
- Weymouth Wales FC
- Weymouth Playing Field
