= South African cricket team in the West Indies in 2004–05 =

International cricket tour

	West Indies	South Africa
- Dates: 31 March – 15 May 2005
Captains	Shivnarine Chanderpaul	Graeme Smith

Test series
- Result: South Africa won the 4-match series 2–0
Most runs	Shivnarine Chanderpaul (450)	Graeme Smith (505)
Most wickets	Daren Powell (9)	André Nel (17); Makhaya Ntini (17)
- Player of the series: Graeme Smith (SA)

One Day International series
- Results: South Africa won the 5-match series 5–0
Most runs	Chris Gayle (200)	Boeta Dippenaar (317)
Most wickets	Ian Bradshaw (7)	Charl Langeveldt (11)
- Player of the series: Boeta Dippenaar (SA)

The South Africa national cricket team toured the West Indies from March to May 2005 to play four Test matches and five One Day Internationals (ODIs).

== Squads ==
West Indies	South Africa
Shivnarine Chanderpaul (c)	Graeme Smith (c)
Courtney Browne (wk)	Mark Boucher (wk)
Tino Best	Nicky Boje
Dwayne Bravo	Boeta Dippenaar
Pedro Collins	Herschelle Gibbs
Narsingh Deonarine	Jacques Kallis
Fidel Edwards	André Nel
Chris Gayle	Makhaya Ntini
Ryan Hinds	Shaun Pollock
Wavell Hinds	A B de Villiers
Reon King	Andrew Hall
Brian Lara	Charl Langeveldt
Donovan Pagon	Ashwell Prince
Daren Powell	Jacques Rudolph
Ramnaresh Sarwan	Monde Zondeki
Devon Smith	Justin Kemp
Dwight Washington	Justin Ontong
Ian Bradshaw	
Xavier Marshall	

== Test series summary ==
South Africa won the series 2–0 with two matches drawn.

=== 1st Test ===
31 March–4 April 2005
Scorecard

West Indies	v	South Africa
543/5d (152.1 overs); Wavell Hinds 213 (297); André Nel 3/93 (33 overs)		188 (66.5 overs); AB de Villiers 41 (85); Pedro Collins 3/39 (18 overs)
		269/4 (161 overs) (f/o); Jacques Kallis 109* (346); Ryan Hinds 1/27 (27 overs)

Match drawn
Bourda, Georgetown, Guyana
Umpires: Aleem Dar (PAK) and David Shepherd (ENG)
Player of the match: Shivnarine Chanderpaul (WI)

- West Indies won the toss and elected to bat.
- Narsingh Deonarine and Donovan Pagon (both WI) made their Test debuts.

=== 2nd Test ===
8–12 April 2005
Scorecard

West Indies	v	South Africa
347 (104.4 overs); Brian Lara 196 (286); Makhaya Ntini 6/95 (28 overs)		398 (166.5 overs); Graeme Smith 148 (313); Chris Gayle 4/50 (37.5 overs)
194 (89.5 overs); Ramnaresh Sarwan 107* (221); Makhaya Ntini 7/37 (19.5 overs)		146/2 (44.5 overs); AB de Villiers 62 (126); Daren Powell 1/27 (10 overs); Dwayne Bravo 1/27 (6 overs)

South Africa won by 8 wickets
Queen's Park Oval, Port of Spain, Trinidad
Umpires: Aleem Dar (PAK) and David Shepherd (ENG)
Player of the match: Makhaya Ntini (SA)

- West Indies won the toss and elected to bat.

=== 3rd Test ===
21–24 April 2005 (Note: While five days of play were scheduled for each Test, the third Test reached a result in four days.)
Scorecard

West Indies	v	South Africa
296 (92.2 overs); Brian Lara 176 (225); Monde Zondeki 4/50 (16 overs)		548/9d (177.5 overs); AB de Villiers 178 (351); Chris Gayle 3/85 (27 overs)
166 (54.2 overs); Courtney Browne 68 (75); André Nel 6/32 (16.2 overs)

South Africa won by an innings and 86 runs
Kensington Oval, Bridgetown, Barbados
Umpires: Billy Bowden (NZ) and Simon Taufel (AUS)
Player of the match: André Nel (SA)

- West Indies won the toss and elected to bat.
- The match was scheduled for five days but completed in four.

=== 4th Test ===
29 April–3 May 2005
Scorecard

South Africa	v	West Indies
588/6d (163 overs); Jacques Kallis 147 (287); Daren Powell 2/137 (32 overs)		747 (235.2 overs); Chris Gayle 317 (483); Monde Zondeki 3/120 (25 overs)
127/1 (31 overs); Boeta Dippenaar 56* (101); Tino Best 1/32 (5 overs)

Match drawn
Antigua Recreation Ground, St. John's, Antigua and Barbuda
Umpires: Billy Bowden (NZ) and Simon Taufel (AUS)
Player of the match: Chris Gayle (WI)

- South Africa won the toss and elected to bat.
- Dwight Washington (WI) made his Test debut.
- For the first time, eight centuries were scored in a Test - four from each side.

== ODI series summary ==
=== 1st ODI ===
7 May 2005
Scorecard

West Indies; 253 (48.5 overs)	v	South Africa; 255/2 (45 overs)
Ramnaresh Sarwan 72 (111); Makhaya Ntini 4/46 (10 overs)		Graeme Smith 103 (102); Dwayne Smith 1/21 (3 overs)

South Africa won by 8 wickets
Sabina Park, Kingston, Jamaica
Umpires: Billy Doctrove (WI) and Darrell Hair (AUS)
Player of the match: Graeme Smith (SA)

- West Indies won the toss and elected to bat.

=== 2nd ODI ===
8 May 2005
Scorecard

West Indies; 152/7 (50 overs)	v	South Africa; 124/2 (26.4 overs)
Courtney Browne 46* (59); Shaun Pollock 2/28 (10 overs)		Boeta Dippenaar 60* (78); Ian Bradshaw 2/16 (6 overs)

South Africa won by 8 wickets (D/L method)
Sabina Park, Kingston, Jamaica
Umpires: Billy Doctrove (WI) and Simon Taufel (AUS)
Player of the match: Boeta Dippenaar (SA)

- South Africa won the toss and elected to field.
- South Africa's target was reduced to 124 runs in 33 overs.

=== 3rd ODI ===
11 May 2005
Scorecard

South Africa; 284/6 (50 overs)	v	West Indies; 283 (49.5 overs)
Boeta Dippenaar 123 (129); Dwayne Bravo 2/51 (9 overs)		Chris Gayle 132 (152); Charl Langeveldt 5/62 (9.5 overs)

South Africa won by 1 run
Kensington Oval, Bridgetown, Barbados
Umpires: Darrell Hair (AUS) and Eddie Nicholls (WI)
Player of the match: Charl Langeveldt (SA)

- West Indies won the toss and elected to field.

=== 4th ODI ===
14 May 2005
Scorecard

West Indies; 231/8 (50 overs)	v	South Africa; 232/4 (46.5 overs)
Shivnarine Chanderpaul 85* (103); Makhaya Ntini 3/34 (8 overs)		Ashwell Prince 89* (117); Ian Bradshaw 2/43 (8 overs)

South Africa won by 6 wickets
Queen's Park Oval, Port of Spain, Trinidad
Umpires: Billy Doctrove (WI) and Simon Taufel (AUS)
Player of the match: Ashwell Prince (SA)

- South Africa won the toss and elected to field.

=== 5th ODI ===
15 May 2005
Scorecard

West Indies; 138/7 (20 overs)	v	South Africa; 141/3 (19.1 overs)
Dwayne Bravo 41* (40); Andrew Hall 2/21 (4 overs)		Boeta Dippenaar 61* (47); Ian Bradshaw 1/21 (4 overs)

South Africa won by 7 wickets
Queen's Park Oval, Port of Spain, Trinidad
Umpires: Darrell Hair (AUS) and Eddie Nicholls (WI)
Player of the match: Boeta Dippenaar (SA)

- South Africa won the toss and elected to field.
- The match was reduced before play started to 20 overs per side.
