= Mount Gay North Stars Cricket Ground =

Cricket and football ground in Crab Hill, Barbados

- Interactive map of Mount Gay North Stars Cricket Ground

Ground information
- Location: Crab Hill, Barbados
- Country: Barbados
- Coordinates: 13.3161°N 59.6389°W
- Establishment: c. 1999

Team information
Barbados	(2002/03–2008/09)
- As of 23 April 2022; Source: Ground profile

Mount Gay North Stars Cricket Ground is a cricket ground in Crab Hill, Barbados.

== History ==
Located in the village of northern Barbados village Crab Hill, the ground first played host to representative cricket when Barbados played Jamaica in a first-class match in the 2002–03 Carib Beer Cup. The ground played host to a further seven first-class matches between 2003 and 2009. In March 2009, the Leeward Islands Runako Morton made a score of 210, which was the only first-class double-century to be scored at the ground to date. Two List A one-day matches were played there in the 2005–06 KFC Cup, featuring Barbados against Guyana, and Jamaica against the Windward Islands.

== Records ==
=== First-class ===
- Highest team total: 439 all out by Leeward Islands v Barbados, 2008–09
- Lowest team total: 92 all out by Windward Islands v Barbados, 2003–04
- Highest individual innings: 210 by Runako Morton for Leeward Islands v Barbados, 2008–09
- Best bowling in an innings: 7-33 by Tino Best for Barbados v Windward Islands, 2003–04
- Best bowling in a match: 11-66 by Tino Best, as above

=== List A ===
- Highest team total: 254 for 8 (50 overs) by Jamaica v Windward Islands, 2005–06
- Lowest team total: 243 all out (49.3 overs) by Barbados v Guyana, 2005–06
- Highest individual innings: 106 not out by Ramnaresh Sarwan for Guyana v Barbados, 2005–06
- Best bowling in an innings: 4-49 by Darren Sammy for Windward Islands v Jamaica, 2005–06

== See also ==
- List of cricket grounds in the West Indies
