= Cable and Wireless Sports Club Ground =

Cricket ground in Bridgetown, Barbados

- Interactive map of Cable and Wireless Sports Club Ground

Ground information
- Location: Bridgetown, Barbados
- Country: Barbados
- Coordinates: 13.0902°N 59.5786°W
- Establishment: c. 1973

Team information
Barbados	(2005/06)
- As of 24 April 2022; Source: Ground profile

Cable and Wireless Sports Club Ground is a cricket ground in Bridgetown, Barbados.

== History ==
The ground was established for the employees of Barbados External Telecommunications (BET), which later became Cable & Wireless and LIME. The ground has predominantly been used in club cricket by LIME Sports Club. It played host to three List A one-day matches in the 2005–06 KFC Cup, with Barbados featuring in only one of the matches. The matches were all low scoring affairs.

== Records ==
=== List A ===
- Highest team total: 220 all out (48.4 overs) by Barbados v Windward Islands, 2005–06
- Lowest team total:101 all out (19.5 overs) by Trinidad and Tobago v Jamaica, 2005–06
- Highest individual innings: 71 by Dale Richards for Barbados v Windward Islands, 2005–06
- Best bowling in an innings: 3-17 by David Bernard for Jamaica v Trinidad and Tobago, 2005–06

== See also ==
- List of cricket grounds in the West Indies
