= Codville Rogers =

West Indian cricketer

Personal information
- Full name: Codville Leon Rogers
- Born: 4 July 1976 (age 50); Sandy Point, St. Kitts
- Batting: Left-handed
- Role: Batsman

Domestic team information
- Years: Team
- 2003–2007: Leeward Islands
- FC debut: 19 February 2004 Leeward Islands v Jamaica
- Last FC: 5 February 2007 Leeward Islands v Windward Islands
- LA debut: 25 January 2007 Leeward Islands v Trinidad and Tobago
- Last LA: 2 February 2007 Leeward Islands v Guyana

Career statistics
Competition	FC	LA	T20
Matches	3	2	1
Runs scored	86	54	13
Batting average	14.33	27.00	13.00
100s/50s	0/0	0/1	0/0
Top score	49	50	13
Catches/stumpings	0/0	3/0	0/0
- Source: CricInfo, 17 September 2008

Codville Leon Rogers (born 4 July 1976) is a cricketer from Sandy Point, St. Kitts. A left–hand batsman, Rogers played three first–class matches for St. Kitts and the Leeward Islands from 2003 to 2007.

== Career ==
Rogers played his first match on 19 February 2004 against Jamaica, in Nain. Batting at number two, Rogers made a duck and nine. His next matches were both List–A cricket against Trinidad and Tobago on 25 January 2007, where he scored 50 on his List–A debut, and Guyana, where he scored four. On 28 January, Rogers played a first–class match against Guyana, scoring 26 and 49.

Rogers then faced the Windward Islands in a first–class match on 5 February 2007, scoring another duck and two. He ended his second season of first–class cricket with 77 runs at 19.25 and a career best 49. Rogers' last appearance in domestic cricket game on 30 January 2008 in the Stanford Twenty20. Here, he faced the United States Virgin Islands, scoring 13 runs from nine balls before being bowled.
