= International cricket in 1999–2000 =

Cricket season

The 1999–2000 international cricket season was from September 1999 to April 2000.

== Season overview ==
International tours
Start date	Home team	Away team	Results [Matches]			
Start date	Home team	Away team	Test	ODI	FC	LA
8 October 1999	Bangladesh	West Indies	—	0–2 [2]	—	—
10 October 1999	India	New Zealand	1–0 [3]	3–2 [5]	—	—
14 October 1999	Zimbabwe	Australia	0–1 [1]	0–3 [3]	—	—
29 October 1999	South Africa	Zimbabwe	1–0 [1]	—	—	—
5 November 1999	Australia	Pakistan	3–0 [3]	—	—	—
11 November 1999	Zimbabwe	South Africa	0–1 [1]	—	—	—
18 November 1999	Zimbabwe	Sri Lanka	0–1 [3]	1–3 [5]	—	—
25 November 1999	South Africa	England	2–1 [5]	—	—	—
10 December 1999	Australia	India	3–0 [3]	—	—	—
16 December 1999	New Zealand	West Indies	2–0 [2]	5–0 [5]	—	—
13 February 2000	Pakistan	Sri Lanka	1–2 [3]	0–3 [3]	—	—
16 February 2000	Zimbabwe	England	—	0–3 [4]	—	—
16 February 2000	New Zealand	Australia	0–3 [3]	1–4 [6]	—	—
24 February 2000	India	South Africa	0–2 [2]	3–2 [5]	—	—
16 March 2000	West Indies	Zimbabwe	2–0 [2]	—	—	—
12 April 2000	South Africa	Australia	—	2–1 [3]	—	—
International tournaments
Start date	Tournament				Winners	
25 September 1999	(Kenya) 1999-2000 LG Cup				South Africa	
13 October 1999	(United Arab Emirates) 1999–2000 Coca-Cola Champions Trophy				Pakistan	
9 January 2000	1999–2000 Australia Tri-Nation Series				Australia	
21 January 2000	(South Africa) 2000 Standard Bank Triangular Tournament				South Africa	
22 March 2000	(United Arab Emirates) 1999–2000 Coca-Cola Cup				Pakistan	

== September ==
=== 1999-2000 LG Cup ===
Place	Team	Played	Won	Lost	Points	NetRR
1	India	3	3	0	6	+2.037
2	South Africa	3	2	1	4	-0.233
3	Zimbabwe	3	1	2	2	-1.209
4	Kenya	3	0	3	0	-0.572

Group stage
No.	Date	Team 1	Captain 1	Team 2	Captain 2	Venue	Result
ODI 1503	25 September	Kenya	Maurice Odumbe	Zimbabwe	Alistair Campbell	Gymkhana Club Ground, Nairobi	Zimbabwe by 27 runs
ODI 1504	26 September	India	Ajay Jadeja	South Africa	Hansie Cronje	Gymkhana Club Ground, Nairobi	India by 8 wickets
ODI 1505	28 September	South Africa	Hansie Cronje	Zimbabwe	Alistair Campbell	Gymkhana Club Ground, Nairobi	South Africa by 9 wickets
ODI 1506	29 September	Kenya	Maurice Odumbe	India	Ajay Jadeja	Gymkhana Club Ground, Nairobi	India by 58 runs
ODI 1507	29 September	Kenya	Maurice Odumbe	South Africa	Hansie Cronje	Gymkhana Club Ground, Nairobi	South Africa by 24 runs
ODI 1508	30 September	India	Ajay Jadeja	Zimbabwe	Alistair Campbell	Gymkhana Club Ground, Nairobi	India by 107 runs
Final
No.	Date	Team 1	Captain 1	Team 2	Captain 2	Venue	Result
ODI 1509	3 October	India	Ajay Jadeja	South Africa	Hansie Cronje	Gymkhana Club Ground, Nairobi	South Africa by 26 runs

== October ==
=== West Indies in Bangladesh ===
ODI series
No.	Date	Home captain	Away captain	Venue	Result
ODI 1510	8 October	Aminul Islam	Brian Lara	Bangabandhu National Stadium, Dhaka	West Indies by 73 runs
ODI 1511	9 October	Aminul Islam	Brian Lara	Bangabandhu National Stadium, Dhaka	West Indies by 109 runs

=== New Zealand in India ===
Test series
No.	Date	Home captain	Away captain	Venue	Result
Test 1462	10–14 October	Sachin Tendulkar	Stephen Fleming	PCA IS Bindra Stadium, Mohali	Match drawn
Test 1464	22–25 October	Sachin Tendulkar	Stephen Fleming	Green Park Stadium, Kanpur	India by 8 wickets
Test 1465	29 October–2 November	Sachin Tendulkar	Stephen Fleming	Sardar Patel Stadium, Ahmedabad	Match drawn
ODI series
No.	Date	Home captain	Away captain	Venue	Result
ODI 1522	5 November	Sachin Tendulkar	Stephen Fleming	Madhavrao Scindia Cricket Ground, Rajkot	New Zealand by 43 runs
ODI 1523	8 November	Sachin Tendulkar	Stephen Fleming	Lal Bahadur Shastri Stadium, Hyderabad	India by 174 runs
ODI 1524	11 November	Sachin Tendulkar	Stephen Fleming	Captain Roop Singh Stadium, Gwalior	India by 14 runs
ODI 1525	14 November	Sachin Tendulkar	Stephen Fleming	Nehru Stadium, Guwahati	New Zealand by 48 runs
ODI 1526	17 November	Sachin Tendulkar	Stephen Fleming	Feroz Shah Kotla Ground, Delhi	India by 7 wickets

=== 1999–2000 Coca-Cola Champions Trophy ===
Team	Pld	W	L	T	NR	NRR	Pts
Pakistan	4	3	0	1	0	+1.93	7
Sri Lanka	4	1	2	1	0	-0.217	3
West Indies	4	1	3	0	0	−1.839	2

Group stage
No.	Date	Team 1	Captain 1	Team 2	Captain 2	Venue	Result
ODI 1512	13 October	Sri Lanka	Sanath Jayasuriya	West Indies	Brian Lara	Sharjah Cricket Stadium, Sharjah	West Indies by 3 wickets
ODI 1513	14 October	Pakistan	Wasim Akram	West Indies	Brian Lara	Sharjah Cricket Stadium, Sharjah	Pakistan by 130 runs
ODI 1514	15 October	Pakistan	Wasim Akram	Sri Lanka	Sanath Jayasuriya	Sharjah Cricket Stadium, Sharjah	Match tied
ODI 1515	17 October	Sri Lanka	Sanath Jayasuriya	West Indies	Brian Lara	Sharjah Cricket Stadium, Sharjah	Sri Lanka by 9 wickets
ODI 1516	18 October	Pakistan	Wasim Akram	Sri Lanka	Sanath Jayasuriya	Sharjah Cricket Stadium, Sharjah	Pakistan by 118 runs
ODI 1517	19 October	Pakistan	Moin Khan	West Indies	Brian Lara	Sharjah Cricket Stadium, Sharjah	Pakistan by 138 runs
Final
No.	Date	Team 1	Captain 1	Team 2	Captain 2	Venue	Result
ODI 1519	22 October	Pakistan	Wasim Akram	Sri Lanka	Sanath Jayasuriya	Sharjah Cricket Stadium, Sharjah	Pakistan by 88 runs

=== Australia in Zimbabwe ===
Only Test
No.	Date	Home captain	Away captain	Venue	Result
Test 1463	14–17 October	Alistair Campbell	Steve Waugh	Harare Sports Club, Harare	Australia by 10 wickets
ODI series
No.	Date	Home captain	Away captain	Venue	Result
ODI 1518	21 October	Alistair Campbell	Steve Waugh	Queens Sports Club, Bulawayo	Australia by 83 runs
ODI 1520	23 October	Alistair Campbell	Steve Waugh	Harare Sports Club, Harare	Australia by 9 wickets
ODI 1521	24 October	Alistair Campbell	Steve Waugh	Harare Sports Club, Harare	Australia by 9 wickets

=== Zimbabwe in South Africa ===
Only Test
No.	Date	Home captain	Away captain	Venue	Result
Test 1466	29 October–1 November	Hansie Cronje	Alistair Campbell	Mangaung Oval, Bloemfontein	South Africa by an innings and 13 runs

== November ==
=== Pakistan in Australia ===
Test series
No.	Date	Home captain	Away captain	Venue	Result
Test 1467	5–9 November	Steve Waugh	Wasim Akram	The Gabba, Brisbane	Australia by 10 wickets
Test 1469	18–22 November	Steve Waugh	Wasim Akram	Bellerive Oval, Hobart	Australia by 4 wickets
Test 1472	26–28 November	Steve Waugh	Wasim Akram	WACA Ground, Perth	Australia by an innings and 20 runs

=== South Africa in Zimbabwe ===
Only Test
No.	Date	Home captain	Away captain	Venue	Result
Test 1468	11–14 November	Andy Flower	Hansie Cronje	Harare Sports Club, Harare	South Africa by an innings and 219 runs

=== Sri Lanka in Zimbabwe ===
Test series
No.	Date	Home captain	Away captain	Venue	Result
Test 1470	18–22 November	Andy Flower	Sanath Jayasuriya	Queens Sports Club, Bulawayo	Match drawn
Test 1473	26–30 November	Andy Flower	Sanath Jayasuriya	Harare Sports Club, Harare	Sri Lanka by 6 wickets
Test 1474	4–8 December	Andy Flower	Sanath Jayasuriya	Harare Sports Club, Harare	Match drawn
ODI series
No.	Date	Home captain	Away captain	Venue	Result
ODI 1527	11 December	Andy Flower	Sanath Jayasuriya	Queens Sports Club, Bulawayo	No result
ODI 1528	12 December	Andy Flower	Sanath Jayasuriya	Queens Sports Club, Bulawayo	Sri Lanka by 13 runs
ODI 1529	15 December	Andy Flower	Sanath Jayasuriya	Harare Sports Club, Harare	Sri Lanka by 98 runs
ODI 1530	18 December	Andy Flower	Sanath Jayasuriya	Harare Sports Club, Harare	Sri Lanka by 6 wickets
ODI 1531	19 December	Andy Flower	Sanath Jayasuriya	Harare Sports Club, Harare	Zimbabwe by 6 wickets

=== England in South Africa ===
Test series
No.	Date	Home captain	Away captain	Venue	Result
Test 1471	25–28 November	Hansie Cronje	Nasser Hussain	Wanderers Stadium, Johannesburg	South Africa by an innings and 21 runs
Test 1475	9–13 December	Hansie Cronje	Nasser Hussain	St George's Park, Port Elizabeth	Match drawn
Test 1480	26–30 December	Hansie Cronje	Nasser Hussain	Kingsmead Cricket Ground, Durban	Match drawn
Test 1482	2–5 January	Hansie Cronje	Nasser Hussain	Newlands Cricket Ground, Cape Town	South Africa by an innings and 37 runs
Test 1483	14–18 January	Hansie Cronje	Nasser Hussain	Centurion Park, Centurion	England by 2 wickets

== December ==
=== India in Australia ===
Test series - Border–Gavaskar Trophy
No.	Date	Home captain	Away captain	Venue	Result
Test 1476	10–14 December	Steve Waugh	Sachin Tendulkar	Adelaide Oval, Adelaide	Australia by 285 runs
Test 1479	26–30 December	Steve Waugh	Sachin Tendulkar	Melbourne Cricket Ground, Melbourne	Australia by 180 runs
Test 1481	2–4 January	Steve Waugh	Sachin Tendulkar	Sydney Cricket Ground, Sydney	Australia by an innings and 141 runs

=== West Indies in New Zealand ===
Test series
No.	Date	Home captain	Away captain	Venue	Result
Test 1477	16–20 December	Stephen Fleming	Brian Lara	Seddon Park, Hamilton	New Zealand by 9 wickets
Test 1478	26–30 December	Stephen Fleming	Brian Lara	Basin Reserve, Wellington	New Zealand by an innings and 105 runs
ODI series
No.	Date	Home captain	Away captain	Venue	Result
ODI 1532	2 January	Stephen Fleming	Brian Lara	Eden Park, Auckland	New Zealand by 3 wickets
ODI 1533	4 January	Stephen Fleming	Brian Lara	Owen Delany Park, Taupō	New Zealand by 7 wickets
ODI 1534	6 January	Stephen Fleming	Brian Lara	McLean Park, Napier	New Zealand by 4 wickets
ODI 1535	8–9 January	Stephen Fleming	Brian Lara	Wellington Regional Stadium, Wellington	New Zealand by 4 wickets
ODI 1538	11 January	Stephen Fleming	Brian Lara	AMI Stadium, Christchurch	New Zealand by 20 runs

== January ==
=== 1999–2000 Australia Tri-Nation Series ===
Team	P	W	L	T	NR	NRR	Points
Australia	8	7	1	0	0	+0.920	14
Pakistan	8	4	4	0	0	+0.070	8
India	8	1	7	0	0	−0.972	2

Group stage
No.	Date	Team 1	Captain 1	Team 2	Captain 2	Venue	Result
ODI 1536	9 January	Australia	Steve Waugh	Pakistan	Wasim Akram	The Gabba, Brisbane	Pakistan by 45 runs
ODI 1537	10 January	India	Sachin Tendulkar	Pakistan	Wasim Akram	The Gabba, Brisbane	Pakistan by 2 wickets
ODI 1539	12 January	Australia	Steve Waugh	India	Sachin Tendulkar	Melbourne Cricket Ground, Melbourne	Australia by 28 runs
ODI 1540	14 January	Australia	Steve Waugh	India	Sachin Tendulkar	Sydney Cricket Ground, Sydney	Australia by 5 wickets
ODI 1541	16 January	Australia	Steve Waugh	Pakistan	Wasim Akram	Melbourne Cricket Ground, Melbourne	Australia by 6 wickets
ODI 1542	19 January	Australia	Steve Waugh	Pakistan	Wasim Akram	Sydney Cricket Ground, Sydney	Australia by 81 runs
ODI 1543	21 January	India	Sachin Tendulkar	Pakistan	Wasim Akram	Bellerive Oval, Hobart	Pakistan by 32 runs
ODI 1545	23 January	Australia	Steve Waugh	Pakistan	Wasim Akram	Melbourne Cricket Ground, Melbourne	Australia by 15 runs
ODI 1547	25 January	India	Sachin Tendulkar	Pakistan	Wasim Akram	Adelaide Oval, Adelaide	India by 48 runs
ODI 1548	26 January	Australia	Steve Waugh	India	Sachin Tendulkar	Adelaide Oval, Adelaide	Australia by 152 runs
ODI 1550	28 January	India	Sachin Tendulkar	Pakistan	Wasim Akram	WACA Ground, Perth	Pakistan by 104 runs
ODI 1552	30 January	Australia	Steve Waugh	India	Sachin Tendulkar	WACA Ground, Perth	Australia by 4 wickets
Finals
No.	Date	Team 1	Captain 1	Team 2	Captain 2	Venue	Result
ODI 1554	2 February	Australia	Steve Waugh	Pakistan	Wasim Akram	Melbourne Cricket Ground, Melbourne	Australia by 6 wickets
ODI 1556	4 February	Australia	Steve Waugh	Pakistan	Wasim Akram	Sydney Cricket Ground, Sydney	Australia by 152 runs

=== 2000 Standard Bank International One-Day Series ===
Group stage
No.	Date	Team 1	Captain 1	Team 2	Captain 2	Venue	Result
ODI 1544	21 January	South Africa	Hansie Cronje	Zimbabwe	Andy Flower	Wanderers Stadium, Johannesburg	South Africa by 6 wickets
ODI 1546	23 January	South Africa	Hansie Cronje	England	Nasser Hussain	Mangaung Oval, Bloemfontein	England by 9 wickets
ODI 1549	26 January	South Africa	Hansie Cronje	England	Nasser Hussain	Newlands Cricket Ground, Cape Town	South Africa by 1 run
ODI 1551	28 January	England	Nasser Hussain	Zimbabwe	Andy Flower	Newlands Cricket Ground, Cape Town	Zimbabwe by 104 runs
ODI 1553	30 January	England	Nasser Hussain	Zimbabwe	Andy Flower	Diamond Oval, Kimberley	England by 8 wickets
ODI 1555	2 February	South Africa	Hansie Cronje	Zimbabwe	Andy Flower	Kingsmead Cricket Ground, Durban	Zimbabwe by 2 wickets
ODI 1557	4 February	South Africa	Hansie Cronje	England	Nasser Hussain	Buffalo Park, East London	South Africa by 2 wickets
ODI 1558	6 February	South Africa	Hansie Cronje	Zimbabwe	Andy Flower	St George's Park, Port Elizabeth	South Africa by 53 runs
ODI 1558a	9 February	England	Nasser Hussain	Zimbabwe	Andy Flower	Centurion Park, Centurion	Match abandoned
Final
No.	Date	Team 1	Captain 1	Team 2	Captain 2	Venue	Result
ODI 1560	13 February	South Africa	Hansie Cronje	England	Nasser Hussain	Wanderers Stadium, Johannesburg	South Africa by 38 runs

== February ==
=== Sri Lanka in Pakistan ===
ODI series
No.	Date	Home captain	Away captain	Venue	Result
ODI 1559	13 February	Saeed Anwar	Sanath Jayasuriya	National Stadium, Karachi	Sri Lanka by 29 runs
ODI 1561	16 February	Saeed Anwar	Sanath Jayasuriya	Jinnah Stadium, Gujranwala	Sri Lanka by 34 runs
ODI 1566	19 February	Saeed Anwar	Sanath Jayasuriya	Gaddafi Stadium, Lahore	Sri Lanka by 104 runs
Test series
No.	Date	Home captain	Away captain	Venue	Result
Test 1485	26 February–1 March	Saeed Anwar	Sanath Jayasuriya	Rawalpindi Cricket Stadium, Rawalpindi	Sri Lanka by 2 wickets
Test 1487	5–9 March	Saeed Anwar	Sanath Jayasuriya	Arbab Niaz Stadium, Peshawar	Sri Lanka by 57 runs
Test 1489	12–15 March	Moin Khan	Sanath Jayasuriya	National Stadium, Karachi	Pakistan by 222 runs

=== England in Zimbabwe ===
ODI series
No.	Date	Home captain	Away captain	Venue	Result
ODI 1562	16 February	Andy Flower	Nasser Hussain	Queens Sports Club, Bulawayo	England by 5 wickets
ODI 1564	18 February	Andy Flower	Nasser Hussain	Queens Sports Club, Bulawayo	England by 1 wicket
ODI 1567	20 February	Andy Flower	Nasser Hussain	Harare Sports Club, Harare	England by 85 runs
ODI 1569a	23 February	Andy Flower	Nasser Hussain	Harare Sports Club, Harare	Match abandoned

=== Australia in New Zealand ===
ODI series
No.	Date	Home captain	Away captain	Venue	Result
ODI 1560a	16 February	Stephen Fleming	Steve Waugh	Wellington Regional Stadium, Wellington	Match abandoned
ODI 1563	17 February	Stephen Fleming	Steve Waugh	Wellington Regional Stadium, Wellington	No result
ODI 1568	23 February	Stephen Fleming	Steve Waugh	Carisbrook, Dunedin	Australia by 50 runs
ODI 1569	26 February	Stephen Fleming	Steve Waugh	AMI Stadium, Christchurch	Australia by 48 runs
ODI 1570	1 March	Stephen Fleming	Steve Waugh	McLean Park, Napier	Australia by 5 wickets
ODI 1571	3 March	Stephen Fleming	Steve Waugh	Eden Park, Auckland	New Zealand by 7 wickets
Test series
No.	Date	Home captain	Away captain	Venue	Result
Test 1488	11–15 March	Stephen Fleming	Steve Waugh	Eden Park, Auckland	Australia by 62 runs
Test 1491	24–28 March	Stephen Fleming	Steve Waugh	Basin Reserve, Wellington	Australia by 6 wickets
Test 1493	31 March–3 April	Stephen Fleming	Steve Waugh	Seddon Park, Hamilton	Australia by 6 wickets

=== South Africa in India ===
Test series
No.	Date	Home captain	Away captain	Venue	Result
Test 1484	24–28 February	Sachin Tendulkar	Hansie Cronje	Wankhede Stadium, Mumbai	South Africa by 4 wickets
Test 1486	2–6 March	Sachin Tendulkar	Hansie Cronje	M. Chinnaswamy Stadium, Bengaluru	South Africa by an innings and 71 runs
ODI series
No.	Date	Home captain	Away captain	Venue	Result
ODI 1572	9 March	Sourav Ganguly	Hansie Cronje	Nehru Stadium, Kochi	India by 3 wickets
ODI 1573	12 March	Sourav Ganguly	Hansie Cronje	Keenan Stadium, Jamshedpur	India by 6 wickets
ODI 1574	15 March	Sourav Ganguly	Hansie Cronje	Nahar Singh Stadium, Faridabad	South Africa by 2 wickets
ODI 1575	17 March	Sourav Ganguly	Hansie Cronje	Reliance Stadium, Vadodara	India by 4 wickets
ODI 1576	19 March	Sourav Ganguly	Hansie Cronje	Vidarbha Cricket Association Ground, Nagpur	South Africa by 10 runs

== March ==
=== Zimbabwe in the West Indies ===
Test Series
No.	Date	Home captain	Away captain	Venue	Result
Test 1490	16–20 March	Jimmy Adams	Andy Flower	Queen's Park Oval, Port of Spain	West Indies by 35 runs
Test 1492	24–28 March	Jimmy Adams	Andy Flower	Sabina Park, Kingston	West Indies by 10 wickets

=== 1999–2000 Coca-Cola Cup ===
Team	Pld	W	L	T	NR	NRR	Pts
South Africa	4	3	1	0	0	+0.354	6
Pakistan	4	2	2	0	0	+0.596	4
India	4	1	3	0	0	−1.014	2

Group stage
No.	Date	Team 1	Captain 1	Team 2	Captain 2	Venue	Result
ODI 1577	22 March	India	Sourav Ganguly	South Africa	Hansie Cronje	Sharjah Cricket Stadium, Sharjah	South Africa by 10 wickets
ODI 1578	23 March	India	Sourav Ganguly	Pakistan	Moin Khan	Sharjah Cricket Stadium, Sharjah	India by 5 wickets
ODI 1579	24 March	Pakistan	Moin Khan	South Africa	Hansie Cronje	Sharjah Cricket Stadium, Sharjah	South Africa by 3 wickets
	26 March	India	Sourav Ganguly	Pakistan	Moin Khan	Sharjah Cricket Stadium, Sharjah	Pakistan by 98 runs
ODI 1581	27 March	India	Sourav Ganguly	South Africa	Hansie Cronje	Sharjah Cricket Stadium, Sharjah	South Africa by 6 wickets
ODI 1582	28 March	Pakistan	Moin Khan	South Africa	Hansie Cronje	Sharjah Cricket Stadium, Sharjah	Pakistan by 67 runs
Final
No.	Date	Team 1	Captain 1	Team 2	Captain 2	Venue	Result
ODI 1583	31 March	Pakistan	Moin Khan	South Africa	Hansie Cronje	Sharjah Cricket Stadium, Sharjah	Pakistan by 16 runs

== April ==
=== Australia in South Africa ===
ODI series
No.	Date	Home captain	Away captain	Venue	Result
ODI 1587	12 April 2000	Shaun Pollock	Steve Waugh	Kingsmead Cricket Ground, Durban	South Africa won by 6 wickets
ODI 1589	14 April 2000	Shaun Pollock	Steve Waugh	Newlands Cricket Ground, Cape Town	Australia won by 5 wickets
ODI 1591	14 April 2000	Shaun Pollock	Steve Waugh	Wanderers Stadium, Johannesburg	South Africa won by 4 wickets
