= Jean Paul (cricketer) =

West Indian cricketer (born 1985)

Personal information
- Full name: Jean Cedric Paul
- Born: 13 November 1985 (age 40); Dominica
- Batting: Left-handed
- Bowling: Right-arm medium

Domestic team information
- Years: Team
- 2004/05–2006/07: Windward Islands
- 2006: Dominica

Career statistics
Competition	FC	LA	T20
Matches	7	1	1
Runs scored	19	1	2
Batting average	3.16	1.00	2.00
100s/50s	0/0	0/0	0/0
Top score	10*	1	2
Balls bowled	799	24	6
Wickets	15	0	0
Bowling average	33.53	–	–
5 wickets in innings	0	–	–
10 wickets in match	0	–	–
Best bowling	4/52	–	–
Catches/stumpings	2/–	0/–	0/–
- Source: CricketArchive, 21 September 2008

Jean Cedric Paul (born 13 November 1985) is a Dominican former cricketer who played for Dominica, Windward Islands and the West Indies A cricket team.

Paul was born on Dominica in 1985. He played under-19 cricket for Dominica, winning the Windward Islands under-19 competition with the side in 2003, and for the Windward Islands under-19 side before making his debut for the senior Windward islands side in February 2005. His debut came in a Carib Beer Cup match against Trinidad and Tobago at Guaracara Park, his only appearance for the senior side during the 2004/05 season. He went on to play in a total of seven first-class matches for the Windward Islands, two the following season and four in 2006/07. He played his only List A match in July 2005 for West Indies A against Sri Lanka A on the West Indies A team's tour of Sri Lanka. Paul had been called into the tour as a replacement, one of seven after players on the A team tour had been called into the West Indies squad. In 2006 he played his only Twenty20 cricket match, a first-round tie for Dominica in the Stanford Twenty20 tournament against Grenada. He played one more match for Dominica, an unclassified Twenty20 match against St Lucia in 2011, taking two wickets.

Predominantly a right-arm medium pace bowler, Paul took 15 wickets in his seven first-class matches, at a bowling average of 33.53 runs per wicket; his best bowling figures of 4/52 were taken on debut. He did not take any wickets in either his List A or Twenty20 matches.
