= Crab Hill, Barbados =

Coordinates: 13°19′0″N 59°38′0″W

Crab Hill is a settlement in Barbados, at the northern end of the parish of Saint Lucy. The place was so named because large numbers of crabs would appear in the area during rainfall; people would catch the crabs and keep them as pets. The population is 727 (2018), which makes it the most populous place in the parish of St. Lucy. Crab Hill is the site of the St. Lucy Police Station. The Mount Gay North Stars Cricket Ground is located in Crab Hill.
