= Ryan Ramdass =

Guyanese cricketer (born 1983)

Cricket information
- Batting: Right-handed
- Bowling: Right-arm offbreak

Career statistics
Competition	Test	ODI
Matches	1	1
Runs scored	26	1
Batting average	13.00	1.00
100s/50s	0/0	0/0
Top score	23	1
Catches/stumpings	2/–	0/–
- Source: ESPNcricinfo, 25 January 2006

Ryan Rakesh Ramdass (born 3 July 1983) is a Guyanese cricketer. Ramdass is a right-handed batsman and a right-arm offbreak bowler who occasionally occupies the position of wicketkeeper.

He made his debut for Guyana in a match against Barbados in which he scored a half-century. When Guyana was hit by floods in early 2005, Ramdass' poultry business was affected, but he continued to play for the squad, achieving his career best 144 not out against Barbados.

In 2005, he selected for the full West Indies squad after a good set of results in the West Indies A series in Sri Lanka, playing in two matches.
