= Patrick Browne (cricketer) =

Barbadian cricketer (born 1982)

Personal information
- Full name: Patrick Anderson Browne
- Born: 26 January 1982 (age 44); St Philip, Barbados
- Batting: Right-handed
- Role: Wicket-keeper

International information
- National side: West Indies
- ODI debut: 27 January 2008 v South Africa
- Last ODI: 27 June 2008 v Australia

Domestic team information
- Years: Team
- 2004/05–2011/12: Barbados

Career statistics
Competition	ODI	FC	LA	T20
Matches	5	62	28	2
Runs scored	134	2,131	468	62
Batting average	33.50	21.31	22.28	31.00
100s/50s	0/0	0/13	0/2	0/1
Top score	49*	83	66	55
Catches/stumpings	2/0	163/6	34/5	3/1
- Source: CricketArchive, 26 January 2025

Patrick Anderson Browne (born 26 January 1982) is a Barbadian cricketer who represented the West Indies in One Day International cricket.

Browne is a wicketkeeper-batsman and made his international debut during the West Indies' tour of South Africa in 2007–08.
