= Sewnarine Chattergoon =

Guyanese cricketer

Personal information
- Born: 3 April 1981 (age 45); Fyrish, West Bank, Berbice, Guyana
- Batting: Left-handed
- Bowling: Right-arm leg-spin
- Role: Batsman

International information
- National side: West Indies
- Test debut: 3 April 2008 v Sri Lanka
- Last Test: 19 December 2008 v New Zealand
- ODI debut: 7 May 2006 v Zimbabwe
- Last ODI: 13 January 2009 v New Zealand

Career statistics
Competition	Test	ODI	FC	LA
Matches	4	18	63	65
Runs scored	127	370	3,479	1,660
Batting average	18.14	24.66	33.77	27.66
100s/50s	0/0	0/2	5/20	2/8
Top score	46	54*	143	119
Balls bowled	–	80	445	297
Wickets	–	1	8	9
Bowling average	–	48.00	26.50	22.00
5 wickets in innings	–	0	0	0
10 wickets in match	–	0	0	0
Best bowling	–	1/1	4/9	2/17
Catches/stumpings	4/–	6/–	46/–	15/–
- Source: CricketArchive, 7 November 2009

Sewnarine Chattergoon (born 3 April 1981) is a Guyanese cricketer who made his début for the West Indies cricket team against Zimbabwe on their 2006 tour.

== Biography ==
Chattergoon is a left-handed opening batsman who has registered four centuries in first class cricket, where he plays for Guyana. After scoring 9 in his début ODI match against Zimbabwe, Chattergoon made an unbeaten 54 in his second game, helping the West Indies to a ten-wicket victory; his batting partner, Chris Gayle, made 95 not out in the opening stand of 156. However Chattergoon was left out of the squad for the final two ODIs, and did not return to the squad until the fourth ODI against India later that summer. Chattergoon did not play the fourth ODI, got a golden duck in the fifth, and did not make the squad for the Test series. Following an impressive domestic season for Guyana in 2007, Chattergoon was recalled to the West Indies ODI squad against South Africa in the 2008 series, where he played in the second, third and fourth ODIs. He impressed with fluent knocks of 34, 52 and 48 in the three innings whilst opening the batting. He clocked up 134 runs in that series, proving his skills at the highest level and has answered the WICB selectors call for an opening partner for Chris Gayle.

After making his test début for the West Indies against a formidable Sri Lankan team at the Queens Park Oval in Trinidad, he made a statement by starting his test career with technically correct innings of 46. In his first Test match he demonstrated the technical ability comparable to that of Greenidge and Haynes. His left-handed style of batting combined with his defensive technique accounts for an opening batsman in the making. As well as his batting, Chattergoon has shown ability in his slip fielding, incomparable to those previous players in the similar position by taking a catch at third slip in the first innings of his début Test match.

Other achievements in domestic cricket includes the 119 he hit in the final of the 2005–06 KFC Cup, the regional one-day tournament of the West Indies, out of a total 247 for 7 to help Guyana beat Barbados by three wickets and win the title.
