= Adam Sanford =

Dominica cricketer

Personal information
- Born: 12 July 1975 (age 51); Dublanc, Dominica
- Batting: Right-handed
- Bowling: Right-arm fast-medium
- Role: Bowler

International information
- National sides: West Indies (2002–2004); United States (2013)
- Test debut (cap 242): 11 April 2002; West Indies v India
- Last Test: 19 March 2004; West Indies v England

Domestic team information
- Years: Team
- 1997: Windward Islands
- 2002–2008: Leeward Islands
- 2002: Antigua and Barbuda

Career statistics
Competition	Test	FC	LA	T20
Matches	11	57	4	3
Runs scored	72	453	18	—
Batting average	4.80	7.42	9.00	—
100s/50s	0/0	0/0	0/0	—
Top score	18*	37	16*	—
Balls bowled	2,217	11,089	146	50
Wickets	30	198	4	3
Bowling average	43.86	30.92	27.50	19.00
5 wickets in innings	0	5	0	0
10 wickets in match	0	2	0	0
Best bowling	4/132	7/40	3/40	2/28
Catches/stumpings	4/–	23/–	0/–	1/–
- Source: ESPNcricinfo, 5 April 2015

Adam Sanford (born 12 July 1975) is a former professional cricketer who played eleven Test matches for the West Indies between 2002 and 2004. He later qualified for the U.S. national team, playing three Twenty20 fixtures for them in 2013.

With the exception of a single first-class match for the Windward Islands in 1997, Sanford's West Indian domestic cricket was played for the Leeward Islands: despite being born in Dominica - a member of the Windward Islands Cricket Board of Control -, he lived ten years and served as a policeman in Antigua and Barbuda, which also he represented once. Sanford played 11 Test matches for the West Indies, taking 15 wickets in five Tests in the 2001–02 home series against India, when he became the first indigenous Carib to play for the West Indies. He also went on a tour of New Zealand in June 2002, but after taking five wickets in two Tests including a bowling analysis of one for 101 in the final match, he was dropped for the tour of India the following season.

Sanford returned to the side a year and a half later, playing two Tests against South Africa and taking seven wickets, before rounding off his career so far with two home Tests against England. His bowling on that series was criticised by TV commentator and former Test player Geoff Boycott, who claimed that Sanford "couldn't have got [his] granny out". Sanford was dropped again after the second Test against England.
