= Carl Simon =

West Indian cricketer (born 1973)

Personal information
- Born: 17 October 1973 (age 53); St. John's, Antigua and Barbuda
- Batting: Left-handed
- Bowling: Right-arm Fast Medium

Carl Leonard Simon, born 17 October 1973, in St John's, Antigua, is a West Indian cricketer who has played first-class and List A cricket for the Leeward Islands.
