= Dwight Washington =

Jamaican cricketer (born 1983)

Personal information
- Full name: Dwight Marlon Washington
- Born: 5 March 1983 (age 43); Montego Bay, Jamaica
- Batting: Right-handed
- Bowling: Right-arm fast

International information
- National side: West Indies
- Only Test: 29 April 2005 v South Africa

Career statistics
Competition	Test	First-class
Matches	1	18
Runs scored	7	206
Batting average	–	12.87
100s/50s	0/0	0/1
Top score	7*	58
Balls bowled	174	2,346
Wickets	0	48
Bowling average	–	20.97
5 wickets in innings	–	1
10 wickets in match	–	0
Best bowling	–	5/20
Catches/stumpings	3/–	7/–
- Source: Cricinfo, 30 October 2017

Dwight Marlon Washington (born 5 March 1983) is a West Indian international cricketer.

Washington made his first-class debut as a fast bowler for West Indies B in the Carib Beer Cup in 2003–04, taking 20 wickets at 22.00 and earning a place in a strong Carib Beer XI against the England XI at the end of the season. Against Guyana, batting in his usual position of number 11, he scored 58 off 58 balls, including six sixes.

He played for Jamaica in the 2004–05 season, taking 19 wickets at 16.84 and helping Jamaica win the title. He took 4 for 18 and 5 for 20 in the match against Windward Islands at Nain. He was selected to play in the Fourth Test against South Africa later that season, but took no wicket for 93 on a batsmen's pitch that produced 1462 runs (including a Test record eight centuries) and only 17 wickets.

He toured Sri Lanka with West Indies A in June and July 2005, then played three matches for Jamaica in the KFC Cup later that year, then dropped out of top-level cricket at the age of 22.
