= Hyron Shallow =

West Indies cricketer (born 1982)

Hyron Courtney Rohan Shallow (born 24 September 1982, in Saint Vincent and the Grenadines) is a West Indies cricketer who has played first-class and List A cricket for the Windward Islands. He also represents Tetsworth as an overseas professional in the Oxfordshire Cricket Association. He is a right-handed batsman and an occasional right-arm off-break bowler.
