= Alcindo Holder =

West Indies cricketer (born 1982)

Alcindo Rennae Holder (born 24 September 1982 in Bridgetown) is a West Indies cricketer who played in the 2002 U-19 Cricket World Cup in New Zealand. A right-handed batsman and right-arm off break bowler, Holder made his debut for Barbados in 2005–06. He is the father of two children: Jadaeya Aleena-Rennae Holder and Jadaeja Alcindo-Rennae Holder both of whom play cricket, however his daughter Jadaeya Holder is a national player who made her debut in 2025 on the Barbados U19 Women's team at the age of 14. He is married to singer Tanya Clarke.

== Career ==
After representing the West Indies in the 2002 Under-19 World Cup, Holder suffered a long wait before making his debut for Barbados, eventually coming in the KFC Cup one-day match against Guyana in October 2005, a match in which Holder scored 2 sixes during his innings of 24. He enjoyed a successful start, finishing his first season with a batting average in excess of 40, although it dropped significantly during his second year.

After the conclusion of the 2006–07 season, Holder was stabbed just below the heart during what was described as a 'domestic dispute'. Although he was on the critical list for 48 hours, he survived the wound and returned to first-class cricket in January 2008.
