= Richard Kelly (West Indian cricketer) =

West Indian cricketer (born 1984)

Richard Alexander Kelly (born 19 February 1984, in Trinidad), is a West Indian former cricketer. He played first-class and List A cricket for Trinidad and Tobago. He is known for his hard–hitting and accurate swing bowling. After his performances in the 2006 Carib Beer Regional Tournament he was named allrounder of the series. He is also the owner and head coach at Kelly's Cricket Academy in Trinidad and Tobago and Canada and was also Assistant Coach for Barbados Tridents in 2020 and head coach of Trinity College East Cricket Team.
