= Dave Mohammed =

West Indian cricketer (born 1979)

Personal information
- Born: 8 October 1979 (age 47); Princes Town, Trinidad and Tobago
- Batting: Left-handed
- Bowling: Slow left-arm wrist-spin
- Role: Bowler

International information
- National side: West Indies
- Test debut (cap 254): 2 January 2004 v South Africa
- Last Test: 19 November 2006 v Pakistan
- ODI debut (cap 131): 10 May 2006 v Zimbabwe
- Last ODI: 24 August 2008 v Canada

Domestic team information
- Years: Team
- 2001–2011: Trinidad and Tobago

Career statistics
| Competition | Test | ODI | FC | LA |
|---|---|---|---|---|
| Matches | 5 | 7 | 73 | 37 |
| Runs scored | 225 | 0 | 1,571 | 180 |
| Batting average | 32.14 | – | 16.71 | 15.00 |
| 100s/50s | 0/1 | 0/0 | 0/5 | 0/0 |
| Top score | 52 | 0* | 74* | 43 |
| Balls bowled | 1,065 | 353 | 13,104 | 1,619 |
| Wickets | 13 | 10 | 233 | 48 |
| Bowling average | 51.38 | 23.50 | 27.11 | 20.79 |
| 5 wickets in innings | 0 | 0 | 6 | 0 |
| 10 wickets in match | 0 | 0 | 2 | 0 |
| Best bowling | 3/98 | 3/37 | 7/48 | 4/23 |
| Catches/stumpings | 1/– | 1/– | 39/– | 11/– |
- Source: ESPNcricinfo, 10 June 2024

Dave Mohammed (born 8 October 1979) is a former West Indian cricketer. He is a slow left-arm wrist-spin bowler, and bats left-handed.

Having played only three first-class matches for Trinidad and Tobago, Mohammed was called up to the West Indies squad for the third Test against South Africa in March 2001, but did not make his Test debut until January 2004, again against South Africa. After one further Test against England Mohammed lost the spinner's position to Omari Banks.

Following a productive domestic season in 2006, Mohammed was recalled firstly to the West Indies One Day International (ODI) side, and subsequently to the Test side, for the series against India. A match-winning performance in the final ODI was followed by a half century in the first Test at Antigua, which led to the West Indies hanging on for a draw with one wicket remaining. He played in a subsequent series against Pakistan, where he impressed with his lower-order batting.
