= 2003–04 Red Stripe Bowl =

Cricket tournament

- Dates: 1 – 19 October 2003
- Administrator(s): WICB
- Cricket format: List A (50 overs)
- Tournament format(s): Group stage, finals
- Host(s): Antigua and Barbuda; Jamaica
- Champions: Guyana (8th title)
- Participants: 10
- Matches: 23
- Most runs: (Guyana) Ramnaresh Sarwan (202)
- Most wickets: (Trinidad and Tobago) Dinanath Ramnarine (Barbados) Pedro Collins (Barbados) Ian Bradshaw (Guyana) Mahendra Nagamootoo (12)

The 2003–04 Red Stripe Bowl was the 30th edition of what is now the Regional Super50, the domestic limited-overs cricket competition for the countries of the West Indies Cricket Board (WICB). It ran from 1 to 19 October 2003, with matches played in Antigua and Barbuda and Jamaica.

Ten teams contested the competition, divided into two groups of five. For a third consecutive season, Antigua and Barbuda entered as a separate team, with the remaining Leeward Islands players competing for a "Rest of Leeward Islands" team. A University of the West Indies team entered for the second and final time, while the West Indies under-19s competed for the first time. Canada were invited as the sole international guest team. The semi-finals and final of the competition were all held in Discovery Bay, Jamaica, with Guyana eventually defeating Barbados in the final to win their eighth domestic one-day title. Guyanese batsman Ramnaresh Sarwan led the tournament in runs, while four bowlers (Dinanath Ramnarine, Pedro Collins, Ian Bradshaw, and Mahendra Nagamootoo) were the joint leading wicket-takers.

== Squads ==
Antigua and Barbuda	Barbados	Canada	Guyana	Jamaica
Sylvester Joseph (c); Bertel Baltimore; Wilden Cornwall; Derryck Edwards; Ridley Jacobs; Kerry Jeremy; Anthony Lake; Austin Richards; Curtis Roberts; Carl Simon; Ian Tittle; Earl Waldron	Courtney Browne (c); Sulieman Benn; Ian Bradshaw; Sherwin Campbell; Pedro Collins; Corey Collymore; Vasbert Drakes; Fidel Edwards; Ryan Hinds; Ryan Hurley; Floyd Reifer; Dale Richards; Dwayne Smith; Kurt Wilkinson	Ishwar Maraj (c); Ashish Bagai; Umar Bhatti; Austin Codrington; Sunil Dhaniram; Zahid Hussain; Karun Jethi; Sandeep Jyoti; Don Maxwell; Asif Mulla; Ashish Patel; Abdool Samad; Kevin Sandher; Aftab Shamshudeen	Shivnarine Chanderpaul (c); Sewnarine Chattergoon; Esuan Crandon; Lennox Cush; Narsingh Deonarine; Travis Dowlin; Rayon Griffith; Neil McGarrell; Mahendra Nagamootoo; Vishal Nagamootoo; Ryan Ramdass; Ramnaresh Sarwan	Robert Samuels (c); Carlton Baugh; David Bernard; Gareth Breese; Chris Gayle; Wavell Hinds; Brenton Parchment; Daren Powell; Ricardo Powell; Andrew Richardson; Marlon Samuels; Jerome Taylor
Rest of Leeward Islands	Trinidad and Tobago	(Cricket West Indies) University of the West Indies	West Indies U19	Windward Islands
Stuart Williams (c); Alex Adams; Omari Banks; Virgil Browne; Chaka Hodge; Shane Jeffers; Steve Liburd; Frank Monzack; Runako Morton; Elsroy Powell; Carl Tuckett; Tonito Willett; Jason Williams	Daren Ganga (c); Shazam Babwah; Dwayne Bravo; Merv Dillon; Rayad Emrit; Andy Jackson; Imran Jan; Aneil Kanhai; Brian Lara; Theodore Modeste; Dave Mohammed; Gibran Mohammed; Dinanath Ramnarine; Rodney Sooklal	Philo Wallace (c); Jason Bennett; Derrick Bishop; Maurice Clarke; Ryan Cunningham; Shawn Graham; Jason Haynes; Keith Hibbert; Dwayne Jordan; Ryan Nurse; Jason Parris; Stanton Proverbs	Denesh Ramdin (c); Jonathan Augustus; Rishi Bachan; Lionel Baker; Kirk Edwards; Craig Emmanuel; Assad Fudadin; Larry Joseph; Zamal Khan; Tishan Maraj; Xavier Marshall; Mervin Matthew; Ravi Rampaul; Liam Sebastien; Lendl Simmons; Barrington Yearwood	Rawl Lewis (c); Kirsten Casimir; Cameron Cuffy; Romel Currency; John Eugene; Orlanzo Jackson; Alvin La Feuille; Junior Murray; Kenroy Peters; Darren Sammy; Shane Shillingford; Devon Smith; Fernix Thomas

== Group stage ==
=== Zone A ===
Team	Pld	W	L	NR	A	Pts	NRR
Jamaica	4	4	0	0	0	16	+1.738
Trinidad and Tobago	4	2	1	1	0	11	+1.095
Rest of Leewards	4	2	2	0	0	10	–0.053
Windward Islands	4	1	2	1	0	8	+0.163
Canada	4	0	4	0	0	4	–2.345

1 October 2003
Scorecard

Rest of Leewards; 203/6 (50 overs)	v	Trinidad and Tobago; 102/3 (25 overs)

Trinidad and Tobago won by 13 runs (D/L)
Sir Frank Worrell Cricket Ground, Mona

- When play was stopped Trinidad and Tobago needed to have scored 90 runs to win.

2 October 2003
Scorecard

Windward Islands; 196/6 (50 overs)	v	Canada; 69 (34.5 overs)

Windward Islands won by 127 runs
Jamalco Sports Club Ground, Kingston
Player of the match: Rawl Lewis (Win)

3 October 2003
Scorecard

Jamaica; 281/7 (50 overs)	v	Rest of Leewards; 177 (47.2 overs)

Jamaica won by 104 runs
Kensington Park, Kingston
Player of the match: Marlon Samuels (Jam)

4 October 2003
Scorecard

Canada; 112 (36.2 overs)	v	Trinidad and Tobago; 113/4 (21.3 overs)

Trinidad and Tobago won by 6 wickets
Alpart Sports Club Ground, Nain
Player of the match: Brian Lara (T&T)

5 October 2003
Scorecard

Windward Islands; 146 (46 overs)	v	Jamaica; 151/3 (27.2 overs)

Jamaica won by 7 wickets
Alpart Sports Club Ground, Nain

7 October 2003
Scorecard

Windward Islands; 206/8 (50 overs)	v	Rest of Leewards; 207/5 (45 overs)

Rest of Leewards won by 5 wickets
Chedwin Park, Spanish Town

8 October 2003
Scorecard

Canada; 196/7 (50 overs)	v	Jamaica; 198/4 (29 overs)

Jamaica won by 6 wickets
Old Harbour Road Cricket Ground, Port Esquivel

9 October 2003
Scorecard

Trinidad and Tobago; 198/7 (50 overs)	v	Windward Islands

No result
Kensington Park, Kingston

- Two players, Merv Dillon and Fernix Thomas, were struck by lightning during the match, but were not seriously injured.

11 October 2003
Scorecard

Rest of Leewards; 265/7 (50 overs)	v	Canada; 180 (46.4 overs)

Rest of Leewards won by 85 runs
Melbourne Park, Kingston

12 October 2003
Scorecard

Jamaica; 210/9 (50 overs)	v	Trinidad and Tobago; 208 (48.4 overs)

Jamaica won by 2 runs
Sabina Park, Kingston

=== Zone B ===
Team	Pld	W	L	NR	A	Pts	NRR
Barbados	4	3	1	0	0	13	+0.626
Guyana	4	3	1	0	0	13	+0.391
Antigua and Barbuda	4	2	1	0	1	11	+0.605
West Indies U19	4	1	3	0	0	7	–0.368
(Cricket West Indies) UWI	4	0	3	0	1	5	–1.703

1 October 2003
Scorecard

Guyana; 252/6 (50 overs)	v	West Indies U19; 238/8 (50 overs)

Guyana won by 14 runs
Antigua Recreation Ground, St. John's

2 October 2003
Scorecard

UWI (Cricket West Indies); 116/1 (31.3 overs)	v	Barbados; 176/3 (26.2 overs)

Barbados won by 7 wickets (D/L)
Antigua Recreation Ground, St. John's
Player of the match: Ryan Hurley (Bar)

- Barbados' target was 176 runs in 29 overs.

3 October 2003
Scorecard

West Indies U19; 69 (24.5 overs)	v	Antigua and Barbuda; 50/2 (9.1 overs)

Antigua and Barbuda won by 8 wickets (D/L)
Antigua Recreation Ground, St. John's
Player of the match: Kerry Jeremy (Ant)

- Antigua and Barbuda's target was 50 runs in 28 overs.

4 October 2003
Scorecard

Guyana; 258/6 (50 overs)	v	(Cricket West Indies) UWI; 144 (40.5 overs)

Guyana won by 114 runs
Antigua Recreation Ground, St. John's
Player of the match: Ramnaresh Sarwan (Guy)

5 October 2003
Scorecard

Barbados; 184 (48.4 overs)	v	Antigua and Barbuda; 186/7 (46.4 overs)

Antigua and Barbuda won by 3 wickets
Antigua Recreation Ground, St. John's
Player of the match: Anthony Lake (Ant)

7 October 2003
Scorecard

UWI (Cricket West Indies); 165 (42 overs)	v	West Indies U19; 166/3 (33.4 overs)

West Indies U19 won by 7 wickets
Antigua Recreation Ground, St. John's
Player of the match: Denesh Ramdin (U19)

8 October 2003
Scorecard

Guyana; 191/9 (50 overs)	v	Barbados; 194/2 (34.4 overs)

Barbados won by 8 wickets
Antigua Recreation Ground, St. John's
Player of the match: Dwayne Smith (Bar)

9 October 2003
Scorecard

Antigua and Barbuda	v	(Cricket West Indies) UWI

Match abandoned
Antigua Recreation Ground, St. John's

11 October 2003
Scorecard

West Indies U19; 161 (48.2 overs)	v	Barbados; 162/7 (41.5 overs)

Barbados won by 3 wickets
Antigua Recreation Ground, St. John's
Player of the match: Ryan Hurley (Bar)

12 October 2003
Scorecard

Antigua and Barbuda; 181 (49.4 overs)	v	Guyana; 185/6 (47.2 overs)

Guyana won by 3 wickets
Antigua Recreation Ground, St. John's
Player of the match: Ramnaresh Sarwan (Guy)

== Finals ==
=== Semi-finals ===
16 October 2003
Scorecard

Guyana; 183 (49.5 overs)	v	Jamaica; 179 (49.1 overs)

Guyana won by 4 runs
Kaiser Sports Club, Discovery Bay
Player of the match: Neil McGarrell (Guy)

17 October 2003
Scorecard

Barbados; 175 (48.2 overs)	v	Trinidad and Tobago; 114 (36 overs)

Barbados won by 61 runs
Kaiser Sports Club, Discovery Bay
Player of the match: Ian Bradshaw (Bar)

=== Final ===
19 October 2003
Scorecard

Guyana; 212/9 (50 overs)	v	Barbados; 156 (36 overs)

Guyana won by 27 runs (D/L)
Kaiser Sports Club, Discovery Bay
Player of the match: Lennox Cush (Guy)

- Barbados' target was 184 runs in 37 overs.

== Statistics ==
=== Most runs ===
The top five run scorers (total runs) are included in this table.

Player	Team	Runs	Inns	Avg	Highest	100s	50s
Ramnaresh Sarwan	Guyana	202	6	33.66	91	0	2
Shivnarine Chanderpaul	Guyana	199	6	33.16	66	0	1
Chris Gayle	Jamaica	191	5	47.75	72*	0	2
Shazam Babwah	Trinidad and Tobago	179	4	89.50	103*	1	0
Sewnarine Chattergoon	Guyana	171	6	28.50	54	0	1

Source: CricketArchive

=== Most wickets ===
The top five wicket takers are listed in this table, listed by wickets taken and then by bowling average.

Player	Team	Overs	Wkts	Ave	SR	Econ	BBI
Dinanath Ramnarine	Trinidad and Tobago	38.2	12	12.15	20.76	3.51	4/25
Pedro Collins	Barbados	45.2	12	13.76	21.76	3.79	5/23
Ian Bradshaw	Barbados	52.4	12	12.45	22.54	3.31	4/30
Mahendra Nagamootoo	Guyana	48.1	12	12.90	20.72	3.73	5/33
Jerome Taylor	Jamaica	38.0	9	14.90	32.18	2.77	3/18

Source: CricketArchive
