= 1999–2000 Red Stripe Bowl =

Cricket tournament

- Dates: 27 October – 7 November 1999
- Administrator: WICB
- Cricket format: List A (50 overs)
- Tournament format(s): Group stage, finals
- Champions: Jamaica (6th title)
- Participants: 8
- Matches: 15
- Most runs: (Antigua and Barbuda) Sylvester Joseph (244)
- Most wickets: (Guyana) Neil McGarrell (9)

The 1999–2000 Red Stripe Bowl was the 26th season of what is now the Regional Super50, the domestic limited-overs cricket competition for the countries of the West Indies Cricket Board (WICB). It ran from 27 October to 7 November 1999.

Eight teams contested the competition – the six regular teams of West Indian domestic cricket (Barbados, Guyana, Jamaica, the Leeward Islands, Trinidad and Tobago, and the Windward Islands), plus two invited international teams from the ICC Americas region (Bermuda and Canada). The tournament was impacted by rain, with three matches (including the final) being interrupted and another three (including a semi-final) being abandoned entirely. Jamaica eventually defeated the Leeward Islands in the final to win their sixth domestic one-day title. Leeward Islands batsman Sylvester Joseph led the tournament in runs, while Guyana's Neil McGarrell took the most wickets.

== Squads ==
Barbados	Bermuda	Canada	Guyana
Philo Wallace (c); Courtney Browne; Hendy Bryan; Sherwin Campbell; Pedro Collins; Adrian Griffith; Ryan Hinds; Roland Holder; Ryan Hurley; Antonio Mayers; Winston Reid; Floyd Reifer; Horace Walrond	Charlie Marshall (c); Arnold Adams; Dennis Archer; Herbert Bascombe; Richard Basden; Hasan Durham; Peter Philpott; Irving Romaine; Dexter Smith; Albert Steede; Clarke Trott; Kwame Tucker	Joseph Harris (c); Ashish Bagai; Desmond Chumney; George Codrington; Melvin Croning; Muneeb Diwan; Davis Joseph; Damian Mills; Brian Rajadurai; Kevin Sandher; Sanjayan Thuraisingam	Shivnarine Chanderpaul (c); Kevin Darlington; Nicholas de Groot; Travis Dowlin; Andrew Gonsalves; Reon King; Neil McGarrell; Mahendra Nagamootoo; Vishal Nagamootoo; Ramnaresh Sarwan; Keith Semple
Jamaica	Leeward Islands	Trinidad and Tobago	Windward Islands
Courtney Walsh (c); Gareth Breese; Leon Garrick; Chris Gayle; Wavell Hinds; Brian Murphy; Nehemiah Perry; Ricardo Powell; Franklyn Rose; Robert Samuels; Matthew Sinclair; Laurie Williams	Stuart Williams (c); Alex Adams; Hamish Anthony; Keith Arthurton; Colin Cannonier; Wilden Cornwall; Ridley Jacobs; Dave Joseph; Sylvester Joseph; Anthony Lake; Runako Morton; Goldwyn Prince; Carl Tuckett	Brian Lara (c); Ian Bishop; Navin Chan; Merv Dillon; Daren Ganga; Kenneth Hazel; Suruj Ragoonath; Dinanath Ramnarine; Denis Rampersad; Lincoln Roberts; Richard Smith	Rawl Lewis (c); Vernon Dumas; Dawnley Joseph; Roy Marshall; Nixon McLean; Reynold McLean; Tibbles Moore; McNeil Morgan; Junior Murray; Wayne Phillip; Devon Smith; Dennison Thomas; Balty Watt

== Group stage ==
=== Zone A ===
Team	Pld	W	L	T	NR	Pts	NRR
Jamaica	3	3	0	0	0	6	+0.953
Guyana	3	2	1	0	0	4	+1.106
Windward Islands	3	1	2	0	0	2	+0.446
Bermuda	3	0	3	0	0	0	–2.527

27 October 1999
Scorecard

Jamaica; 118/6 (41 overs)	v	Bermuda; 95/8 (25 overs)

Jamaica won by 10 runs (D/L)
Alpart Sports Club Ground, Nain
Player of the match: Chris Gayle (Jam)

- Jamaica's innings was reduced to 41 overs, Bermuda required 106 runs in 25 overs to win.

28 October 1999
Scorecard

Windward Islands; 76 (35 overs)	v	Guyana; 77/7 (28.1 overs)

Guyana won by 3 wickets
Alpart Sports Club Ground, Nain
Player of the match: Neil McGarrell (Guy)

30 October 1999
Scorecard

Windward Islands; 101 (47.4 overs)	v	Jamaica; 104/3 (29.3 overs)

Jamaica won by 7 wickets
Sabina Park, Kingston
Player of the match: Franklyn Rose (Jam)

31 October 1999
Scorecard

Guyana; 146 (49.5 overs)	v	Jamaica; 147/3 (42 overs)

Jamaica won by 7 wickets
Sabina Park, Kingston
Player of the match: Chris Gayle (Jam)

1 November 1999
Scorecard

Bermuda; 102 (42.1 overs)	v	Guyana; 104/2 (18.1 overs)

Guyana won by 8 wickets
Kensington Park, Kingston
Player of the match: Keith Semple (Guy)

2 November 1999
Scorecard

Windward Islands; 209 (49.4 overs)	v	Bermuda; 48 (26.3 overs)

Windward Islands won by 161 runs
Kensington Park, Kingston
Player of the match: Rawl Lewis (Win)

=== Zone B ===
Team	Pld	W	L	T	A	Pts	NRR
Leeward Islands	3	2	0	0	1	5	+0.658
Barbados	3	2	1	0	0	4	+1.482
Canada	3	0	1	0	2	2	–2.780
Trinidad and Tobago	3	0	2	0	1	1	–1.480

29 October 1999
Scorecard

Barbados; 120 (40 overs)	v	Leeward Islands; 121/6 (42.2 overs)

Leeward Islands won by 4 wickets
Antigua Recreation Ground, St. John's

30 October 1999
Scorecard

Barbados; 220/8 (50 overs)	v	Canada; 88/7 (41 overs)

Barbados won by 114 runs (D/L)
Antigua Recreation Ground, St. John's

- Canada's target was 203 runs in 41 overs.

30 October 1999
Scorecard

Leeward Islands; 260/6 (50 overs)	v	Trinidad and Tobago; 213 (48 overs)

Leeward Islands won by 47 runs
Ronald Webster Park, The Valley

31 October 1999
Scorecard

Barbados; 291/7 (50 overs)	v	Trinidad and Tobago; 190 (43.3 overs)

Barbados won by 101 runs
Ronald Webster Park, The Valley

1 November 1999
Scorecard

Canada	v	Trinidad and Tobago

Match abandoned
Ronald Webster Park, The Valley

2 November 1999
Scorecard

Canada	v	Leeward Islands

Match abandoned
Ronald Webster Park, The Valley

== Finals ==
=== Semi-finals ===
5 November 1999
Scorecard

Guyana; 217/6 (50 overs)	v	Leeward Islands; 193/5 (45.1 overs)

Leeward Islands won by 5 wickets
Kaiser Sports Club, Discovery Bay

- The Leeward Islands' target was 192 runs in 46 overs.

6 November 1999
Scorecard

Jamaica	v	Barbados

Match abandoned
Kaiser Sports Club, Discovery Bay

- Jamaica proceeded to the final based on a higher group-stage position.

=== Final ===
7 November 1999
Scorecard

Leeward Islands; 228/7 (50 overs)	v	Jamaica; 177/6 (38 overs)

Jamaica won by 10 runs (D/L)
Kaiser Sports Club, Discovery Bay

- When play was halted, Jamaica needed to have scored 168 runs to win.

== Statistics ==
=== Most runs ===
The top five run scorers (total runs) are included in this table.

Player	Team	Runs	Inns	Avg	Highest	100s	50s
Sylvester Joseph	Leeward Islands	244	4	81.33	100*	1	2
Keith Arthurton	Leeward Islands	166	4	41.50	93	0	1
Robert Samuels	Jamaica	154	4	51.33	77*	0	1
Sherwin Campbell	Barbados	142	3	47.33	102	1	0
Chris Gayle	Jamaica	127	4	42.33	75*	0	1

Source: CricketArchive

=== Most wickets ===
The top five wicket takers are listed in this table, listed by wickets taken and then by bowling average.

Player	Team	Overs	Wkts	Ave	SR	Econ	BBI
Neil McGarrell	Guyana	32.2	9	12.22	21.55	3.40	5/20
Richard Basden	Bermuda	34.0	8	17.75	25.50	4.17	4/46
Goldwyn Prince	Leeward Islands	22.4	7	11.14	19.42	3.44	5/35
Rawl Lewis	Windward Islands	21.4	6	8.66	21.66	2.40	3/10
Courtney Walsh	Jamaica	32.3	6	12.66	32.50	2.33	3/18

Source: CricketArchive

== See also ==
- 1999–2000 Busta Cup
