= University of the West Indies cricket team =

Cricket team

University of the West Indies

Personnel
- Captain: Dave Cumberbatch (2002); Philo Wallace (2003)

Team information
- Founded: late 1940s
- Home ground: Sir Frank Worrell Cricket Ground (Jamaica), Sir Frank Worrell Memorial Ground (Trinidad), 3Ws Oval (Barbados)

A cricket team representing the University of the West Indies (UWI) played several matches in West Indian domestic cricket during the early 2000s, and currently plays at lower levels.

The university's cricket team has been active since the school's foundation in 1948, and from the 1970s regularly played against touring international teams. With the backing of the university's Pro Vice-Chancellor, Professor Hilary Beckles, the university established a Centre for Cricket Research in 1994, and subsequently upgraded facilities at each of its three campuses, in Barbados, Jamaica, and Trinidad and Tobago. Again largely due to Beckles' involvement, UWI's team was invited to compete in the 2002–03 and 2003–04 editions of the Red Stripe Bowl, West Indian cricket's domestic limited-overs competition. The team won only one match in two seasons, and was subsequently dropped from the competition. However, prior to the 2007–08 season the university was involved in the establishment of a Combined Campuses and Colleges team, which effectively continues UWI's prior role in West Indian domestic cricket. Grounds at three of the university's campuses—the Sir Frank Worrell Cricket Ground in Mona, Jamaica; the Sir Frank Worrell Memorial Ground in St. Augustine, Trinidad and Tobago; and the 3Ws Oval in Cave Hill, Barbados—have been used for first-class matches.

== History ==
=== Early years ===
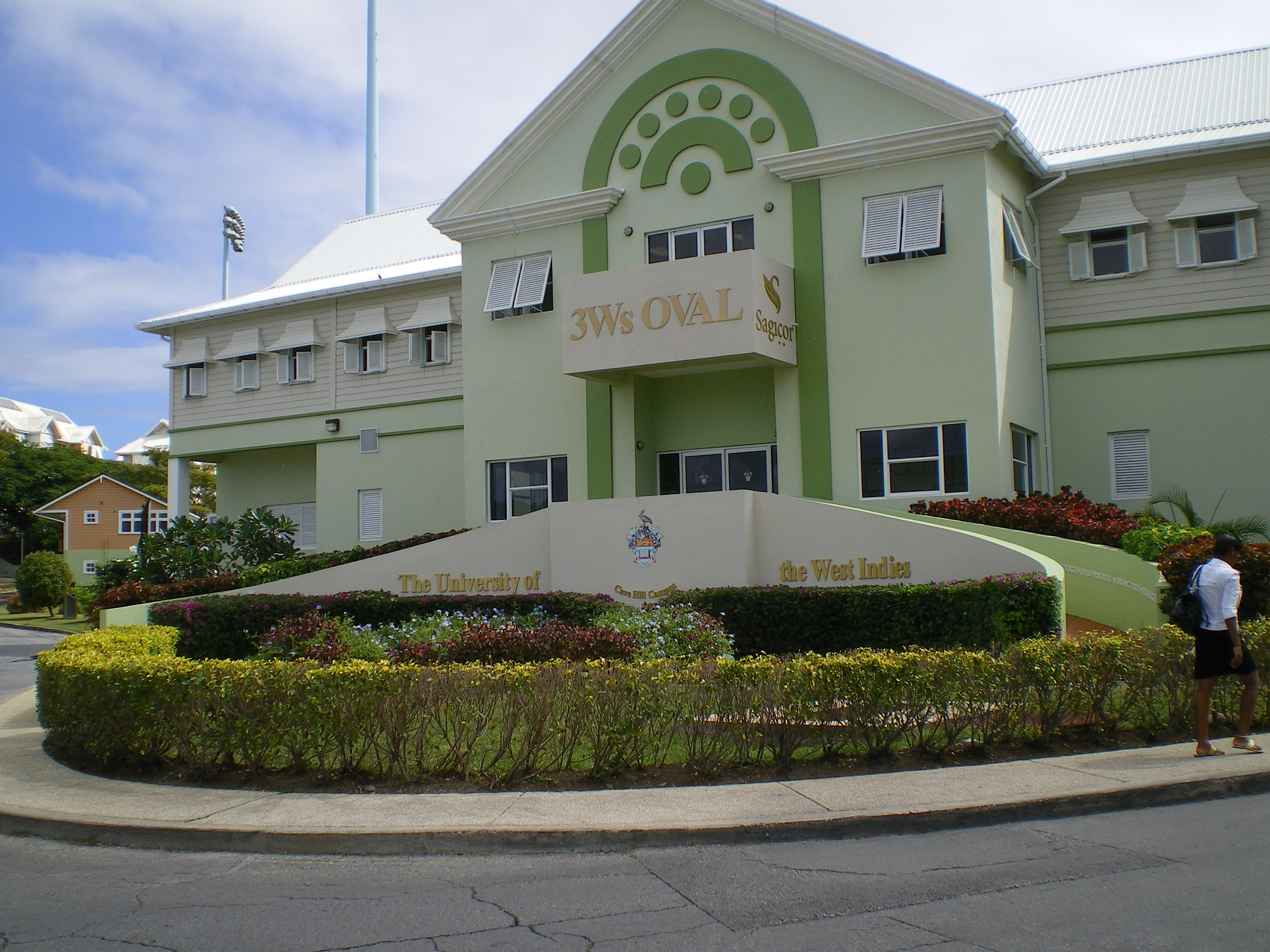
The 3Ws Oval (entrance pictured), named after Sir Frank Worrell, Sir Clyde Walcott, and Sir Everton Weekes, is located on the university's campus in Cave Hill, Barbados, and often hosts university matches.

The university was founded as the University College of the West Indies (UCWI) in 1948, originally serving as a constituent college of the University of London. With its main campus in Mona, Jamaica, the university gained academic independence in 1962, with new campuses having been established in St. Augustine, Trinidad and Tobago (1960), and Cave Hill, Barbados (1963). The sport of cricket was played at the school from the beginning, and the university's team participated in the Senior Cup, the main club cricket tournament in Jamaica. Participation in the sport was encouraged by Sir Frank Worrell, who was a member of the UWI's staff after his retirement from playing, and Professor Gladstone Mills, who was chairman of the university's Sports Advisory Committee. At the behest of Mills, in early 1971 the West Indies Cricket Board of Control (WICBC) arranged for the touring New Zealand national cricket team to play a tour match against the university. This trend of visiting teams playing the university continued throughout the 1970s, with matches against India and Australia occurring later in the decade. However, these matches soon ceased, and from the early 1980s cricket matches were usually only played within the university. It was not until the late 1990s and the early 2000s that UWI began to again play a role in West Indian cricket. Led by the university's Pro Vice-Chancellor, Professor Hilary Beckles, a Centre for Cricket Research was established at the Cave Hill campus in 1994, which resulted in the refurbishment of the on-campus 3Ws Oval. Two years later, in 1996, Beckles convinced what was now the West Indies Cricket Board (WICB) to organise a match between the touring New Zealanders and a University of the West Indies Vice Chancellor's XI. Matches between touring sides and the Vice Chancellor's XI have since become a regular, almost annual, event.

=== Domestic competition ===
In July 2002, the WICB announced that the University of the West Indies would field a team in 2002–03 Red Stripe Bowl, the premier limited-overs competition in the West Indies. The inclusion of new teams was driven by former international player Wes Hall, the WICB's president at the time, who wished to strengthen the development of West Indian players outside of the usual regions. UWI's participation was largely a result of the efforts of Hilary Beckles, who had previously authored several texts on the history of West Indies cricket. Prior to its debut, the university gained the sponsorship of the Sagicor Financial Corporation, a Barbados-based firm. The team debuted in the competition in August 2002, in a match against Saint Vincent and the Grenadines at the Old Harbour Road ground in Port Esquivel, Jamaica. Although Saint Vincent had been pre-match favourites, UWI scored 269/7 and then restricted their opponents to 244/9, winning the match by 25 runs. UWI's team had included nine debutants to Saint Vincent's one, with only captain Dave Cumberbatch and wicket-keeper Andre Coley having played in the competition previously.

Placed in "Zone A" of the competition, alongside Saint Vincent, Barbados, Jamaica, and a "Rest of Leeward Islands" team, UWI lost each of its remaining three matches to finish in last place in its zone. These fixtures comprised a 102–run loss to Barbados, a nine-wicket loss to Rest of Leeward Islands, and a ten-wicket loss to Jamaica. Despite these losses, the university was kept in the competition for the following season. The team gained former West Indian international player Philo Wallace for the 2003–04 competition, as well as two other players with previous experience, prompting one commentator to predict that UWI would be the Bowl's "most improved team". Placed in "Zone B", with Antigua and Barbuda, Barbados, Guyana, and the West Indies under-19s, UWI lost three matches, with the other abandoned due to rain interruption. The university scored over 150 runs only once, against the under-19s team, and only one batsman, Shawn Graham, managed to score a half-century. Due to the overall lack of competition provided by UWI and the other newly introduced teams, the WICB announced in July 2004 that the Red Stripe Bowl would revert to the traditional six-team format. A list of matches the team played during its two seasons in the competition is given below:

No.	Date	Team batting first	Team batting second	Result	Ground	Ref
1	14 August 2002	University of the West Indies 7/269 (50 overs)	St. Vincent and the Grenadines 9/244 (50 overs)	University of the West Indies won by 25 runs	Old Harbour Road Cricket Ground	
2	16 August 2002	Barbados 2/284 (50 overs)	University of the West Indies 182 (41.4 overs)	Barbados won by 102 runs	Chedwin Park	
3	20 August 2002	University of the West Indies 140 (49.3 overs)	Rest of Leeward Islands 1/141 (24 overs)	Rest of Leeward Islands won by 9 wickets	Sir Frank Worrell Cricket Ground	
4	22 August 2002	University of the West Indies 112 (38.3 overs)	Jamaica 0/115 (16.2 overs)	Jamaica won by 10 wickets	Alpart Sports Club Ground	
5	2 October 2003	University of the West Indies 6/258 (50 overs)	Barbados 3/176 (26.2 overs)	Barbados won by 7 wickets (D/L)	Antigua Recreation Ground	
6	4 October 2003	Guyana 2/284 (50 overs)	University of the West Indies 144 (40.5 overs)	Guyana won by 114 runs	Antigua Recreation Ground	
7	7 October 2003	University of the West Indies 165 (42 overs)	West Indies Under-19s 3/166 (33.4 overs)	West Indies Under-19s won by 7 wickets	Antigua Recreation Ground	
8	9 October 2003	Antigua and Barbuda	University of the West Indies	Match abandoned	Antigua Recreation Ground	

=== Recent years ===
Although UWI no longer had List A status, the university continued to play a large role in West Indian cricket from the mid-2000s onward. Grounds at the Cave Hill and St. Augustine campuses were used for warm-up matches at the 2007 ICC Cricket World Cup, and continue to be used occasionally for domestic matches. From the 2007–08 season onwards, UWI combined with other Caribbean universities to form the Combined Campuses and Colleges, which participates in domestic first-class, List A, and Twenty20 matches. However, the majority of the team's players attend UWI campuses. The demand for players has necessitated the introduction of cricket scholarships for players from other islands. In the late 2000s, the university's team was admitted into the Barbados Cricket Association (BCA), and has won four consecutive league titles from the 2009 season. In May 2010, the West Indies High Performance Centre, based at the Cave Hill Campus, was opened by the WICB, which the board's president, Julian Hunte, described as "a very significant step forward in the future development of cricket in the Caribbean". Later that year, the university's team participated as "special guests" at the American College Cricket Spring Break Championship, held in Florida.
