= Hilary Beckles =

Barbadian historian (born 1955)

Sir Hilary Beckles
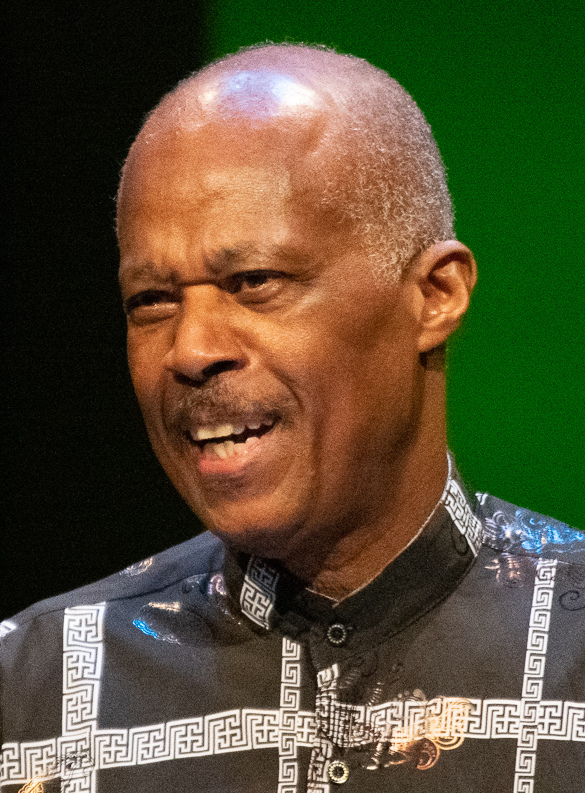
- Beckles in 2022
- Born: 11 August 1955 (age 71); Barbados
- Education: University of Hull (BA, PhD)
- Awards: Knight of St. Andrew (2007); Honorary degrees from the University of Hull (2004), KNUST (2009), and the University of Glasgow (2011)
- Scientific career
- Fields: Afro-Caribbean history, Barbadian history
- Workplaces: University of the West Indies (1980–)

Sir Hilary McDonald Beckles KA (born 11 August 1955) is a Barbadian historian and is the current vice-chancellor of the University of the West Indies (UWI) and chairman of the CARICOM Reparations Commission.

Educated at the University of Hull in England, Beckles began his academic career at UWI and was granted a personal professorship at the age of 37, becoming the youngest in the university's history to be appointed to the position. In 1998, he was named pro-vice-chancellor and chairman of UWI's Board for Undergraduate Studies, and in 2002 was named principal of the university's Cave Hill campus. Although his focus has mainly been on Afro-Caribbean history, especially the economic and social impacts of colonialism and the Atlantic slave trade, Beckles has also had a longstanding involvement with West Indian cricket and has previously served on the board of the West Indies Cricket Board (WICB).

== Biography ==
=== Early life ===
Beckles was born in Barbados, and began his secondary education at Coleridge and Parry Secondary School in Speightstown, Saint Peter, Barbados. He was sent to England to complete his schooling, attending Pitmaston Secondary School and the Bournville College of Further Education in Birmingham. Beckles went on to the University of Hull, completing a BA (Hons) and PhD with the university's Department of Economic and Social History.

=== Academic career ===
Beckles joined the University of the West Indies (UWI) as a history lecturer at its campus in Mona, Jamaica, in 1979, but transferred to its Cave Hill campus in 1984. Having been named a senior research fellow at the London-based Institute of Commonwealth Studies in 1986, he was named Chairman of the History Department at UWI in 1992, a role he served in until 1996, and he subsequently served as dean of the Faculty of Humanities from 1994 to 1998. Beckles received a personal professorship in 1993, the university's youngest appointment to the position. His work has covered a variety of topics within the broader area of Afro-Caribbean history, with works covering early slave rebellions in Barbados, the role of women in the slave trade, and the greater effects of colonialism on present Barbadian society. Other works have focused more specifically on Barbadian history, including education, telecommunications, the labour movement, and sporting culture.

=== Involvement with cricket ===
Having authored several papers and essays on the role of cricket in British West Indian culture, Beckles was the driving force behind the establishment of the Centre for Cricket Research at the Cave Hill campus in 1994, which resulted in the refurbishment of the on-campus 3Ws Oval. Two years later, in 1996, he convinced the West Indies Cricket Board (WICB) to organise a match between the touring New Zealanders and a team selected by the university's vice-chancellor. Matches between touring sides and the Vice Chancellor's XI have since become a regular, almost annual, event. In 1999, Beckles published a two-volume series on the history of cricket in the Caribbean, entitled The Development of West Indies Cricket. Three years later, prior to the start of the 2002–03 cricket season, the WICB announced that the expanded Red Stripe Bowl, the premier limited-overs competition in the West Indies, would feature the university's cricket team. UWI's two-season stint in the tournament was largely a result of Beckles' efforts. He remains a director of what is now the C. L. R. James Centre for Cricket Research (named in honour of C. L. R. James), and is also overall sports coordinator for the university.

=== Other positions ===
Beckles serves on the editorial boards of several academic journals, including William and Mary Quarterly, The Journal of Caribbean History, and Sports in Society, and is an international editor for The Journal of American History. Outside of academia, he has filled the following positions:

- Leader of Barbados delegation, 2001 World Conference Against Racism
- Director, ICC West Indies Cricket World Cup, Inc. (2005–2007)
- Independent Director and Member of Corporate Governance & Ethics Committee, Sagicor Financial Corporation (2005 onwards)
- Director, Sagicor Life Jamaica Limited (2006 onwards)
- Board member, Association for the Study of the Worldwide African Diaspora (2013–2015)
- Chair, CARICOM Reparations Commission

== Awards and honours ==
Beckles was named "Author of the Year" in 1991 by Barbados Cultural Promotions, and We Now Have a Country, a documentary that he wrote, narrated, and co-directed, was named "Documentary of the Year" in 1993 by the Barbados Association of Journalists. The following year, he was named the inaugural winner of the UWI Vice Chancellor's Award for Excellence in the Field of Research. In 2004, Beckles was awarded an honorary Doctor of Letters degree by his alma mater, the University of Hull. He has since received equivalent honorary degrees from the Kwame Nkrumah University of Science and Technology, Ghana, in November 2009, and from the University of Glasgow, Scotland, in June 2011. In November 2007, Beckles was made a Knight of St. Andrew, the highest honour possible in the Order of Barbados.

In December 2021, Beckles was awarded the Governor-General of Antigua and Barbuda's Faithful and Meritorious Award's highest honour, the Cross and Plaque. The award recognises Beckle's "distinguished service to UWI and the Caribbean". In 2026, he was appointed as a Distinguished Scholar for 2026–2027 by New York University’s Center for the Study of Africa and the African Diaspora.

== Criticism ==
Some of Beckles' actions, regarding his role in both sports and academia at the university, have been controversial. One commentator has accused him of engaging in the "exploitation of the nation's traditional love of education and qualifications", referring to Beckles' role in the university's development as "empire-building"; In May 2011, Beckles made a statement suggesting that Chris Gayle was the "don" of West Indian cricket, comparing him to Jamaican drug lord Christopher Coke (otherwise known as "Dudus"). The West Indies Players' Association (WIPA) subsequently wrote to the WICB and UWI asking for Beckles' dismissal from the board, which did not happen.

== Selected bibliography ==
Beckles writes his books as Hilary McD. Beckles.

- Afro-Caribbean Women and Resistance to Slavery in Barbados, Karnak House, 1988. ISBN 978-0907015260
- Natural Rebels: A Social History of Enslaved Black Women in Barbados, 1989. New Brunswick, N.J.: Rutgers University Press. ISBN 978-0813515106
- The Development of West Indies Cricket: The Age of Globalization, vol. 2, Pluto Press, 1999. ISBN 978-0745314723
- The Development of West Indies Cricket: The Age of Nationalism, vol. 1, Pluto Press, 1999. ISBN 978-0745314624
- Centering Woman: Gender Discourses in Caribbean Slave Society, Jamaica: Ian Randle Publishers, 1999. ISBN 978-9768123794
- Liberties Lost: The Indigenous Caribbean and Slave Systems, with Verene A. Shepherd, Cambridge University Press, 2004. ISBN 978-0521435444
- A History of Barbados: From Amerindian Settlement to Caribbean Single Market, Cambridge University Press, 2006. ISBN 978-0521678490
- Britain's Black Debt: Reparations for Caribbean Slavery and Native Genocide, University of the West Indies Press, 2012. ISBN 978-9766402686
- The First Black Slave Society: Britain's "Barbarity Time" in Barbados, 1636–1876, University of the West Indies Press, 2016. ISBN 978-9766405854
- Cricket without a Cause: Fall and Rise of the Mighty West Indian Test Cricketers, Jamaica: Ian Randle Publishers, 2017. ISBN 978-9766379605
- How Britain Underdeveloped the Caribbean: A Reparation Response to Europe's Legacy of Plunder and Poverty, University of the West Indies Press, 2021. ISBN 978-9766408695
- Barbados: Cuffee's Kingdom: First Black New World Freedom Plan, Jamaica: Ian Randle Publishers, 2021. ISBN 978-9768286413
- Cricket's First Revolutionary: Frank Worrell's Political War Against Colonialism in the West Indies, Jamaica: Ian Randle Publishers, 2025. ISBN 978-9768339553
