= Afro-Caribbean history =

For a history of Afro-Caribbean people in the UK, see British African Caribbean community.

Afro-Caribbean history (or African-Caribbean history) is the portion of Caribbean history that specifically discusses the Afro-Caribbean or Black racial (or ethnic) populations of the Caribbean region. Most Afro-Caribbean People are the descendants of captive Africans held in the Caribbean from 1502 to 1886 during the era of the Atlantic slave trade.

Black people from the Caribbean who have migrated (voluntarily, or by force) to the U.S., Canada, Europe, Africa and elsewhere add a significant Diaspora element to Afro-Caribbean history. Because of the complex history of the region, many people who identify as Afro-Caribbean also have European, Middle Eastern, Taino, Chinese, Jewish and/or East Indian genealogies.

It is these peoples, who in the past were referred to and self-identified collectively as Coloured, Black or Negro West Indians, who now generally consider themselves to be black, mixed heritage, creole or African descendant people in the Caribbean and its Diasporas. Their history has been studied by historians such as C. L. R. James (author of The Black Jacobins), Eric Williams and Peter Fryer (Staying Power: The History of Black People in Britain) – and it is their history that is the focus of this article.

== 15th and 16th centuries ==
The archipelagos and islands of the Caribbean were the first sites of African diaspora dispersal in the western Atlantic during the post-Columbian era. Specifically, in 1492, Pedro Alonso Niño, a black Spanish seafarer, piloted one of Columbus's ships. He returned in 1499, but did not settle. In the early 16th century, more Africans began to enter the population of the Spanish Caribbean colonies, sometimes as freedmen, but increasingly as enslaved servants, workers and labourers. This growing demand for African labour in the Caribbean was in part the result of massive depopulation caused by the massacres, harsh conditions and disease brought by European colonists to the Taino and other indigenous peoples of the region.

By the mid-16th century, slave trading from Africa to the Caribbean was so profitable that Francis Drake and John Hawkins were prepared to engage in piracy as well as break Spanish colonial laws, in order to forcibly transport approximately 1500 enslaved people from Sierra Leone to San Domingo (modern-day Haiti and Dominican Republic).

== 17th and 18th centuries ==
During the 17th and 18th centuries, European colonialism in the Caribbean became increasingly reliant on plantation slavery, so that, by the end of the 18th century, on many islands, enslaved (and free) Afro-Caribbeans far outnumbered their European rulers. Throughout the region, Africans developed a variety of response to the plantation system. One was to seek manumission through conventional legal methods, such as working to buy or otherwise engineer personal freedom from individual slave holders.

Individuals who took this route included Olaudah Equiano and Ottobah Cugoano. Often, especially in San Domingo, manumission occurred when slave-holding fathers freed their own children by African mothers. One such case was that of the classical music composer Joseph Bo(u)logne, (known as the Chevalier de Saint-Georges). Perhaps the most dangerous method of liberation from enslavement was the Afro-Caribbean devised system of "marronage", in which people escaped from plantations to establish (or join) armed, independent, forest and mountain communities known as Maroons, where they were led by individuals such as Nanny of the Maroons.

Friction between Maroons and plantation owners led to the First Maroon War and contributed to an atmosphere of simmering rebellion and increasingly harsh repression by the authorities. However, for most enslaved Afro-Caribbean people, individual escape or manumission were only partial answers and could not bring general political and social reform. As a result, the harsh conditions, constant inter-imperial warfare and growing revolutionary sentiments in the region eventually resulted in the Haitian Revolution led by Toussaint L'Ouverture and Jean-Jacques Dessalines.

== 19th century ==
In 1804, after 13 years of war, Haiti, with its overwhelmingly black population and leadership, became the second nation in the Americas to win independence from a European state when the army of former slaves defeated Napoleon's invasion force. During the 19th Century, further waves of rebellion, such as the Baptist War, led by Sam Sharpe in Jamaica, created the conditions for the incremental abolition of slavery in the region, with Cuba the last island to achieve emancipation in 1886.

Emancipation created greater opportunities for self-advancement and travel, with Afro-Caribbean people such as the nursing pioneer Mary Seacole making full use of greater personal freedom. As emancipated Afro-Caribbeans abandoned the plantations, British colonialists, particularly in Trinidad and Tobago sought to replace the diminishing labour force with indentured labourers brought in from colonial India and China.

== 20th century ==
During the 20th century, Afro-Caribbean people began to assert their cultural, economic and political rights with ever more vigor on the world stage, starting with Marcus Garvey's UNIA movement in the U.S. and continuing with Aimé Césaire's negritude movement. From the 1960s, the former slave population began to win their independence from British colonial rule, and were pre-eminent in creating new cultural forms such as reggae music, calypso and Rastafari within the Caribbean itself. However, beyond the region, a new Afro-Caribbean diaspora, including such figures as Stokely Carmichael and DJ Kool Herc was influential in the creation of the hip-hop and black power movements in the US, as well as cultural developments in Europe, as evidenced by influential theorists such as Frantz Fanon and Stuart Hall.

Nevertheless, in the French Caribbean possessions of Guadeloupe and Martinique, the independence movements did not achieve the same success as in the former British Caribbean, in part because of France's offer of complete political integration into the French state and society. Thus, most French Afro-Caribbean people are born as citizens of France, with voting rights and other privileges of citizenship.

== 21st century ==
In the early 21st century, the pop singer Rihanna, with her racy costumes and jet-set life style, seems to epitomize a growing sense of cultural self-assertion and cosmopolitanism amongst Afro-Caribbean young people. While, in political history, the election of Portia Simpson Miller as Prime Minister of Jamaica underlined the growing prominence of Afro-Caribbean women in daily life. But, despite many such obvious individual successes, millions of Afro-Caribbean people across the region continue to face serious historical challenges, including, the eradication of widespread poverty and joblessness in major population centers like Haiti and Jamaica. In addition, questions remain about how far racial equality for Afro-Caribbean people has progressed since the era of racial slavery, particularly in countries with significant white populations.

There has also been a trend of contemporary migration of West Africans to countries such as Jamaica and Trinidad and Tobago.

== List of major figures in Afro-Caribbean history ==
=== Politics ===
- Grantley Herbert Adams — Barbadian politician.
- Jean-Bertrand Aristide — Haitian politician, priest and head of state.
- Juan Almeida Bosque — Cuban revolutionary and politician.
- Paul Bogle — Jamaican political activist.
- Dutty Boukman — Jamaican and Haitian freedom fighter.
- Pedro Albizu Campos — Puerto Rican politician and attorney.
- Forbes Burnham — Guyanese head of government.
- Bussa — Barbadian freedom fighter.
- Mary Eugenia Charles — Dominican head of government.
- Edward Scobie, Dominican-born Journalist, Magazine publisher, Politician and Historian
- Henri Christophe — Haitian revolutionary, general and head of state.
- Jean-Jacques Dessalines — Haiti revolutionary, general and head of state.
- François Duvalier — Haitian president.
- Jean-Claude Duvalier — Haitian president.
- Julien Fédon - Grenadian freedom fighter
- Marcus Garvey — Jamaican politician and writer.
- Sam Hinds — Guyanese head of government.
- Joseph Robert Love - Bahamian Political figure in Jamaica who influenced Marcus Garvey's racial consciousness.
- Antonio Maceo Grajales — Cuban revolutionary and general.
- Michael Manley — Jamaican politician.
- Andrew Holness — Jamaican head of government.
- Nanny of the Maroons — Jamaican freedom fighter.
- Lynden Pindling - First Prime Minister of The Bahamas, and former leader of the PLP that brought about Majority rule.
- Francisco del Rosario Sánchez - political and founding father of the Dominican Republic
- Sam Sharpe — Jamaican freedom fighter.
- Toussaint L'Ouverture — Haitian revolutionary, general and governor.
- Eric Williams — Trinidad and Tobago politician, writer and head of government.

=== Science and philosophy ===
- Stokely Carmichael — Trinidad and Tobago activist and writer.
- Ottobah Cugoano — Natural rights philosopher and abolitionist
- Olaudah Equiano — Abolitionist
- Arturo Schomburg — Puerto Rican Historian and writer.
- Frantz Fanon — Martiniquais writer, psychiatrist and freedom fighter.
- Stuart Hall — Jamaican philosopher.
- C.L.R. James — Trinidad and Tobago activist and writer.
- Walter Rodney — Guyanese activist and writer.
- Mary Seacole — Jamaican hospital director.

=== Arts and culture ===
- Carlos Acosta — Cuban ballet dancer.
- John Barnes — Jamaican-born footballer.
- Frank Bowling — Guyanese-born painter.
- Aimé Césaire — Martiniquais writer.
- Celia Cruz — Cuban singer.
- Brian Lara — Trinidadian Cricketer.
- Bob Marley — Jamaican composer, singer and musician.
- Sidney Poitier - Bahamian American actor
- Cicely Tyson, - Nevis American Actress
- Chevalier de Saint-Georges — Guadeloupan composer.
- Bebo Valdés — Cuban musician.
- Derek Walcott — Saint Lucian poet.
- Bert Williams - Bahamian Actor and Singer

== See also ==
- History of the Caribbean
- Afro-Caribbean
- Afro-Caribbean music
- British Afro-Caribbean community
- Atlantic slave trade
- French Caribbean
- History of Haiti
- History of Jamaica
- History of Cuba

== Bibliography ==
- Campbell, Mavis C. The Maroons of Jamaica, 1655-1796. Trenton, NJ: Africa World Press. 1990.
- Fryer, Peter. Staying Power: The History of Black People in Britain. London: Pluto Press, 1984.
- Gabriel, Deborah. "Jamaica's True Queen: Nanny of the Maroons", Jamaicans.com.
- Gottlieb, Karla. The Mother of Us All: A History of Queen Nanny. Trenton, NJ: Africa World Press, 2000.
- James, C. L. R. The Black Jacobins: Toussaint L'Ouverture and the San Domingo Revolution, Vintage Books, 1963 (Penguin Books, 2001). ISBN 0-14-029981-5
- Sherlock, Philip. 1998. Story of the Jamaican People, Central.
- Williams, E. E. From Columbus to Castro: The History of the Caribbean 1492-1969. First Vintage Books edition 1984 (1970)
- Martin, Tony. Race First: The Ideological and Organizational Struggle of Marcus Garvey and the Universal Negro Improvement Association. Westport, Conn.: Greenwood Press, 1976.
