= Cannonier =

Cannonier is a surname. Notable people with the surname include:

- Colin Cannonier (born 1973), economics professor, cricketer, and footballer from Saint Kitts
- Craig Cannonier (born 1963), Bermudian politician
- Jared Cannonier (born 1984), American professional mixed martial artist
- Oakley Cannonier (born 2004), English footballer
