= International cricket in 1908–09 =

International cricket season

The 1908–09 international cricket season was from September 1908 to April 1909. The season consists with a single international tour.

== Season overview ==
International tours
Start date	Home team	Away team	Results [Matches]			
Start date	Home team	Away team	Test	ODI	FC	LA
15 February 1909	Jamaica	Philadelphia	—	—	1–2 [3]	—

== February ==
=== Philadelphia in Jamaica ===
First-class Series
No.	Date	Home captain	Away captain	Venue	Result
Match 1	15–16 February	Frank Pearce	JH Mason	Sabina Park, Kingston	Jamaica by 9 wickets
Match 2	17–18 February	Frank Pearce	JH Mason	Kensington Park, Kingston	Philadelphia by 172 runs
Match 3	10–20 February	Frank Pearce	JH Mason	Melbourne Park, Kingston	Philadelphia by 8 wickets
