= Old Harbour Road Cricket Ground =

Cricket ground in Port Esquivel, Jamaica

Ground information
- Location: Port Esquivel, Jamaica
- Coordinates: 17.9255°N 77.1379°W
- Establishment: c. 1989

Team information
Jamaica	(2003/04)
- As of 27 April 2022; Source: Ground profile

Old Harbour Road Cricket Ground is a cricket ground in Port Esquivel, Jamaica.

== History ==
With the introduction of the bauxite mining industry to Jamaica in the late 1950s and mid 1960s, a number of sports and social club's were constructed for their employees. The Port Esquivel Sports Club was one such sports and social club, formed for the workers of the nearby Windalco mining operations. The ground played host to two List A one-day matches in the Red Stripe Bowl. The first match was between the University of the West Indies and Saint Vincent and the Grenadines in the 2002–03 edition, with the second match being between Jamaica and Canada in the 2003–04 edition.

== Records ==
=== List A ===
- Highest team total: 269 for 7 (50 overs) by University of the West Indies v Saint Vincent and the Grenadines, 2002–03
- Lowest team total: 196 all out (50 overs) by Canada v Jamaica, 2003–04
- Highest individual innings: 72 by Jason Haynes for University of the West Indies v Saint Vincent and the Grenadines, 2002–03
- Best bowling in an innings: 4-52 by Kenroy Martin for Saint Vincent and the Grenadines v University of the West Indies, as above

== See also ==
- List of cricket grounds in the West Indies
