= Sir Frank Worrell Cricket Ground =

Cricket ground in Kingston, Jamaica

- University of the West Indies Ground

Ground information
- Location: Kingston, Jamaica
- Coordinates: 17.9977°N 76.7405°W
- Establishment: c. 1963

Team information
| University of the West Indies | (2002/03) |
| University of West Indies Vice-Chancellor's XI | (2003/04) |
- As of 26 April 2022; Source: Ground profile

The Sir Frank Worrell Cricket Ground (formerly known as the University of the West Indies Ground) is a cricket ground in Kingston, Jamaica.

== History ==
The ground is located on the campus of the University of the West Indies at Mona in Kingston, which was established in 1948. The cricket ground at the campus was originally known as the University of the West Indies Ground, but was later renamed in honour of Frank Worrell. Under the influence of the university's Pro Vice-Chancellor, Professor Hilary Beckles, a University of the West Indies cricket team was invited to take part in the 2002–03 and 2003–04 editions of the Red Stripe Bowl, with the ground at Kingston playing host to the side for one List A one-day match in the 2002–03 edition against the Rest of Leeward Islands, while in the 2003–04 edition the ground played host to the Rest of Leeward Islands against Trinidad and Tobago. In March 2004, the ground played host to a first-class match between the University of the West Indies Vice Chancellor's XI and a touring England XI, which the England XI won by an innings and 85 runs.

== Records ==
=== List A ===
- Highest team total: 203 for 6 (50 overs) by Rest of Leeward Islands v Trinidad and Tobago, 2003–04
- Lowest team total: 140 all out (49.3 overs) by University of the West Indies v Rest of Leeward Islands, 2002–03
- Highest individual innings: 63 not out by Alex Adams for Rest of Leeward Islands v University of the West Indies, 2002–03
- Best bowling in an innings: 3-15 by Omari Banks for Rest of Leeward Islands v University of the West Indies, as above

== See also ==
- List of cricket grounds in the West Indies
