= Dry Harbour (1812 ship) =

History

France
- Launched: 1804
- Captured: 1812

United Kingdom
- Name: Dry Harbour
- Namesake: Dry Harbour
- Acquired: 1812 by purchase of a prize
- Fate: Condemned c. December 1814

General characteristics
- Tons burthen: 247, or 248 (bm)
- Armament: 1813: 12 × 6-pounder guns (of the New Construction"); 1815:2 × 6-pounder carronades

Dry Harbour was launched in 1804 in France under another name. She was apparently captured in 1812 and became a British merchantman. American privateers captured her in 1814 but she was recaptured shortly thereafter. She was condemned at Antigua circa December 1814.

== Career ==
Dry Harbour first appeared in Lloyd's Register (LR) in 1812 with T.Close, master, Gibson, owner, and trade London–Lisbon. She had undergone a rebuild in 1812.

On 19 December 1812 Dry Harbour, Winter, master, was in the Tagus when a gale struck. She was one of the many vessels that sustained damage.

On 8 September 1813 the American privateers Patapsco and Grampus captured Dry Harbour, Hayes, master, and Eliza, Young, master, off Lanzarote. The privateers sent their prizes to America. (Note: Patapsco, of 259 tons (bm), was armed with 6–10 guns. Grampus, 284 tons (bm), was armed with 10 guns.) (An earlier issue of Lloyd's List (LL) had reported that Dry Harbour had been destroyed.)

In December 1814 LL reported that Dry Harbour, Hayes, master, was one of three vessels that had been recaptured and sent into Bermuda. Dry Harbour had been on a voyage from Teneriffe to London.

Year	Master	Owner	Trade	Source
1813	T.Close; J.Hay	Gibson	London–Lisbon	LR
1814	J.Hay	Gibson	London–"Pnsac"	LR
1815	J.Hay	Gibson	London–Teneriffe	Register of Shipping

== Fate ==
Dry Harbour. Kewley, master, put into Antigua on 20 December 1814 in distress. She had been on a voyage from Teneriffe and Betanila to London. There she was surveyed and declared irreparable in the West Indies.
