= Arnold Adams (cricketer) =

Bermudian cricketer

Domestic team information
- Years: Team
- 1999/00: Bermuda

Career statistics
Competition	List A
Matches	2
Runs scored	0
Batting average	0.00
100s/50s	–/–
Top score	0
Balls bowled	–
Wickets	–
Bowling average	–
5 wickets in innings	–
10 wickets in match	–
Best bowling	–
Catches/stumpings	1/–
- Source: Cricinfo, 20 February 2012

Arnold Adams is a former Bermudian cricketer. Adams' batting style is unknown.

Adams made two List A appearances for Bermuda against Guyana and Windward Islands in the 1999/00 Red Stripe Bowl. Against Guyana, he was dismissed for a duck by Keith Semple, while against the Windward Islands he had the same result, this time being dismissed by McNeil Morgan.
