= Melvin Croning =

Canadian cricketer

Personal information
- Born: 18 April 1970 (age 56); Colombo, Ceylon
- Batting: Right-handed
- Bowling: Right-arm medium

International information
- National side: Canada (1999–2002)
- Source: CricketArchive, 2 February 2016

Melvin Croning (born 18 April 1970) is a former Canadian international cricketer who played for the Canadian national side from 1999 to 2002.

Croning was born in Colombo, Sri Lanka. After emigrating to Canada, he made his international debut in August 1999, in a friendly against Bermuda. Later in 1999, Croning played a single List A match against Barbados in the 1999–00 Red Stripe Bowl, the West Indian domestic limited-overs competition. The following year, he represented Canada in the 2000 Americas Cricket Cup. Croning's next international tournament was the 2001 ICC Trophy, which Canada hosted. He played in four of his team's ten matches, but had little success. Canada placed third in the ICC Trophy to qualify for the 2003 World Cup, but Croning had fallen out of favour by that time. He played his last matches for the national team in August 2002, in the 2002–03 Red Stripe Bowl.
