= 1999–2000 Busta Cup =

Cricket tournament

- Dates: 6 January – 25 February 2000
- Administrator: WICB
- Cricket format: First-class (four-day)
- Tournament format(s): Round-robin, playoffs
- Champions: Jamaica (5th title)
- Participants: 6
- Matches: 18
- Most runs: (Jamaica) Chris Gayle (623)
- Most wickets: (Antigua and Barbuda) Curtly Ambrose (Guyana) Mahendra Nagamootoo (31)

The 1999–2000 Busta Cup was the 34th edition of what is now the Regional Four Day Competition, the domestic first-class cricket competition for the countries of the West Indies Cricket Board (WICB). It was played from 6 January to 25 February 2000.

Six teams contested the competition – Barbados, Guyana, Jamaica, the Leeward Islands, Trinidad and Tobago, and the Windward Islands. Barbados topped the table after the round-robin, but lost to the Leeward Islands in their semi-final. However, the Leeward Islands lost to Jamaica in the final, who won their fifth domestic first-class title. Jamaica's Chris Gayle was the leading run-scorer and was named player of the tournament, while Curtly Ambrose of the Leeward Islands and Guyana's Mahendra Nagamootoo were the equal leading wicket-takers.

== Points table ==
Team	Pld	W	L	LWF	DWF	DLF	Pts
Barbados	5	2	1	0	2	0	48
Jamaica	5	2	1	0	1	1	44
Guyana	5	1	0	0	2	2	40
Leeward Islands	5	1	0	1	1	2	37
Windward Islands	5	0	1	0	3	1	28
Trinidad and Tobago	5	0	1	1	0	3	17
Source: CricketArchive

Key

- W – Outright win (12 points)
- L – Outright loss (0 points)
- LWF – Lost match, but won first innings (4 points)
- DWF – Drawn, but won first innings (6 points)
- DLF – Drawn, but lost first innings (3 points)
- Pts – Total points

== Statistics ==
=== Most runs ===
The top five run-scorers are included in this table, listed by runs scored and then by batting average.

Player	Team	Runs	Inns	Avg	Highest	100s	50s
Chris Gayle	Jamaica	623	14	56.63	168	2	3
Laurie Williams	Jamaica	379	12	34.45	135	1	1
Philo Wallace	Barbados	371	11	37.10	117	2	1
Runako Morton	Leeward Islands	356	11	35.60	110	1	3
Robert Samuels	Jamaica	325	13	27.08	73*	0	3

=== Most wickets ===
The top five wicket-takers are listed in this table, listed by wickets taken and then by bowling average.

Player	Team	Overs	Wkts	Ave	5	10	BBI
Curtly Ambrose	Leeward Islands	250.3	31	12.03	2	0	5/39
Mahendra Nagamootoo	Guyana	285.3	31	20.83	0	0	4/45
Dave Marshall	Barbados	194.1	28	16.17	2	1	7/49
Hendy Bryan	Barbados	217.1	25	19.84	1	0	5/38
Reon King	Guyana	137.0	22	13.68	2	1	5/24

== See also ==
- 1999–2000 Red Stripe Bowl
- Cricket Player MVP
