= Alcoa Sports Club Ground =

Cricket ground in Hulse Hall, Jamaica

- Jamalco Sports Club Ground
- Interactive map of Alcoa Sports Club Ground

Ground information
- Location: Halse Hall, Jamaica
- Country: Jamaica
- Coordinates: 17.9087°N 77.2452°W
- Establishment: c. 1985

Team information
| Jamaica | (1984/85) |
- As of 9 March 2022; Source: Ground profile

Alcoa Sports Club Ground is a cricket ground at Halse Hall in Jamaica. (Note: Both CricketArchive and ESPNcricinfo list the Alcoa Sports Ground and the Jamalco Sports Club Ground as two different grounds; however, it appears they are the same ground and following Alcoa selling their stake in Jamalco in 2014, the ground reverted to its current name.)

== History ==
The home of the Alcoa Sports Club (formerly Jamalco Sports Club), the ground has played host to the Jamaica national cricket team for one major cricket match, a List A one-day match against the Windward Islands in the 1984–85 Geddes Grant/Harrison Line Trophy. In a low-scoring match, the Windward Islands won by 2 wickets. A second one-day match was later played at the ground in the 2003–04 Red Stripe Bowl between the Windward Islands and Canada, which the Windward Islands won by 127 runs.

== See also ==
- List of cricket grounds in the West Indies
