= Three Ws Oval =

Cricket stadium in Barbados

Coordinates: 13°8′8″N 59°37′51″W

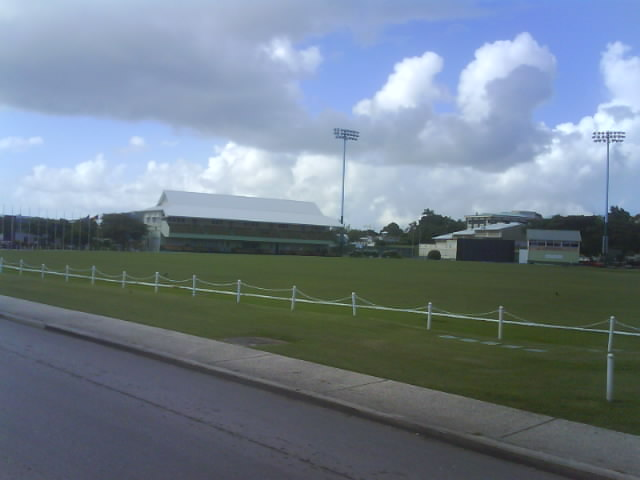
- Three Ws Oval
- Interactive map of Three Ws Oval
- Location: Cave Hill, Barbados
- Owner: University of the West Indies
- Capacity: 2,000
- Surface: Grass

Construction
- Opened: March 2007

Tenants
- University of the West Indies cricket team Combined Campuses and Colleges cricket team

Ground information
- Country: Barbados

International information
- First women's ODI: 11 June 2025: West Indies v South Africa
- Last women's ODI: 17 June 2025: West Indies v South Africa
- First women's T20I: 20 June 2025: West Indies v South Africa
- Last women's T20I: 23 June 2025: West Indies v South Africa
- As of 23 June 2025; Source: ESPNcricinfo

The Three Ws Oval (also commonly nicknamed the 3Ws Oval) is a cricket field at the entrance of the Cave Hill Campus of the University of the West Indies in Barbados. Mostly known for the sculpture in the shape of three large wickets that stand tall on the incline above the field, the 3Ws Oval was one of the team warm-up venues for the 2007 Cricket World Cup finals, which were played at the nearby Kensington Oval stadium. The 3Ws has undergone a huge redevelopment over the last four years to meet ICC standards.

Situated next to the 3Ws Oval are the dormitories, the CLR James Centre for Cricket Research and the basketball courts at the university's campus entrance. Leading up the hill from the cricket ground is the West Indies Cricket Walk of Fame, which leads up to the gravesites of Sir Frank Worrell and Sir Clyde Walcott.

In the park opposite the university, there is a monument in the shape of a 'W' with busts of each of the famous 3Ws – Sir Frank Worrell, Sir Clyde Walcott and Sir Everton Weekes. These three giants of cricket were all born within a few miles of each other in Barbados and became a fearsome batting trio for the West Indies. All three were later knighted for their service to cricket. The facilities at the 3Ws Oval also include an indoor cricket school, which hosts the Sagicor West Indies High Performance Centre (HPC), which was opened in June 2010. The university's cricket teams also call this picturesque ground home for first-class cricket, List A cricket and local club cricket.

== See also ==
- University of the West Indies
- University of the West Indies cricket team
