= Antonio Mayers =

Barbadian cricketer (born 1979)

Personal information
- Full name: Antonio Nigel Mayers
- Born: 23 October 1979 (age 47); Saint Joseph Parish, Barbados
- Batting: Right-handed
- Bowling: Right-arm medium

Domestic team information
- Years: Team
- 1998–2006: Barbados
- 2002: West Indies B
- Source: CricketArchive, 12 January 2016

Antonio Nigel Mayers (born 23 October 1979) is a former Barbadian cricketer who represented both Barbados and West Indies B in West Indian domestic cricket. He was an all-rounder who bowled right-arm medium pace and batted right-handed. He was one of two cricketers from the same family to make their test match cricket debut the other being Kyle Mayers. He made his senior debut for Barbados in October 1998, playing a limited-overs game against the United States during the 1998–99 Red Stripe Bowl. His first-class debut came in January 2000, in the 1999–00 Busta Cup. In the 2001–02 Busta Cup, Mayers was selected to play for West Indies B (effectively a development squad). He scored two half-centuries during the season (55 against Bangladesh A and 50 against the Windward Islands), which were his highest scores at first-class level. Mayers' final appearances for Barbados came in the 2006 Stanford 20/20, against Anguilla and Trinidad and Tobago.
