= Peter Philpott (Bermudian cricketer) =

Bermudian cricketer (born 1967)

Personal information
- Full name: Peter Philpott
- Born: 28 October 1967 (age 59)
- Batting: Unknown
- Bowling: Unknown

Domestic team information
- Years: Team
- 1998/99–1999/00: Bermuda

Career statistics
Competition	List A
Matches	6
Runs scored	11
Batting average	1.83
100s/50s	–/–
Top score	5
Balls bowled	252
Wickets	6
Bowling average	26.00
5 wickets in innings	–
10 wickets in match	–
Best bowling	3/33
Catches/stumpings	4/–
- Source: Cricinfo, 31 March 2013

Peter Philpott (born 28 October 1967) is a former Bermudian cricketer. Philpott's batting and bowling styles are unknown.

Philpott made his debut for Bermuda in a List A match against Trinidad and Tobago during the 1998–99 Red Stripe Bowl, and made two further List A appearances in that tournament against the Windward Islands and Guyana. The following season, he played a further three List A matches against Jamaica, Guyana and the Windward Islands. He took six wickets in his six List A matches, which came at an average of 26.00 and with best figures of 3/33. With the bat, he scored 11 runs with a high score of 5.
