= Ryan Nurse =

Barbadian cricketer

Personal information
- Full name: Ryan Paul Omar Nurse
- Born: 24 April 1983 (age 43); Saint Philip Parish, Barbados
- Batting: Right-handed
- Bowling: Right-arm fast-medium

Domestic team information
- Years: Team
- 2002: West Indies B
- 2004–2008: Barbados
- Source: CricketArchive, 5 August 2016

Ryan Paul Omar Nurse (born 24 April 1983) is a Barbadian cricketer who has represented the Barbadian national side in West Indian domestic cricket. He plays as a right-arm fast bowler.

Nurse was born in Saint Philip Parish, Barbados. Selected in the West Indies under-19s squad for the 2002 Under-19 World Cup in New Zealand, he finished as his team's leading wicket-taker (and fifth overall), taking 13 wickets in six matches (including 5/28 against Australia and 3/18 against Scotland). Nurse made his first-class debut just weeks after the end of the World Cup, playing two Busta Cup matches for West Indies B (a development team). He did not appear at all in top-level domestic cricket during the 2002–03 season, but the following season was a regular for Barbados in four-day matches, and also played in three limited-overs games (in the 2003–04 Red Stripe Bowl). In a four-day match against West Indies B in January 2004, Nurse took 4/19 in the first innings and 7/41 in the second, finishing with career-best figures of 11/60 for the match. His formed trailed off over the following two seasons, however, and he never took another first-class five-wicket haul. Nurse's last appearances for Barbados came in February 2008, in the Stanford 20/20 competition.
