= Dry Harbour Mountains =

Mountain range in north central Jamaica

Coordinates: 18°19′N 77°24′W

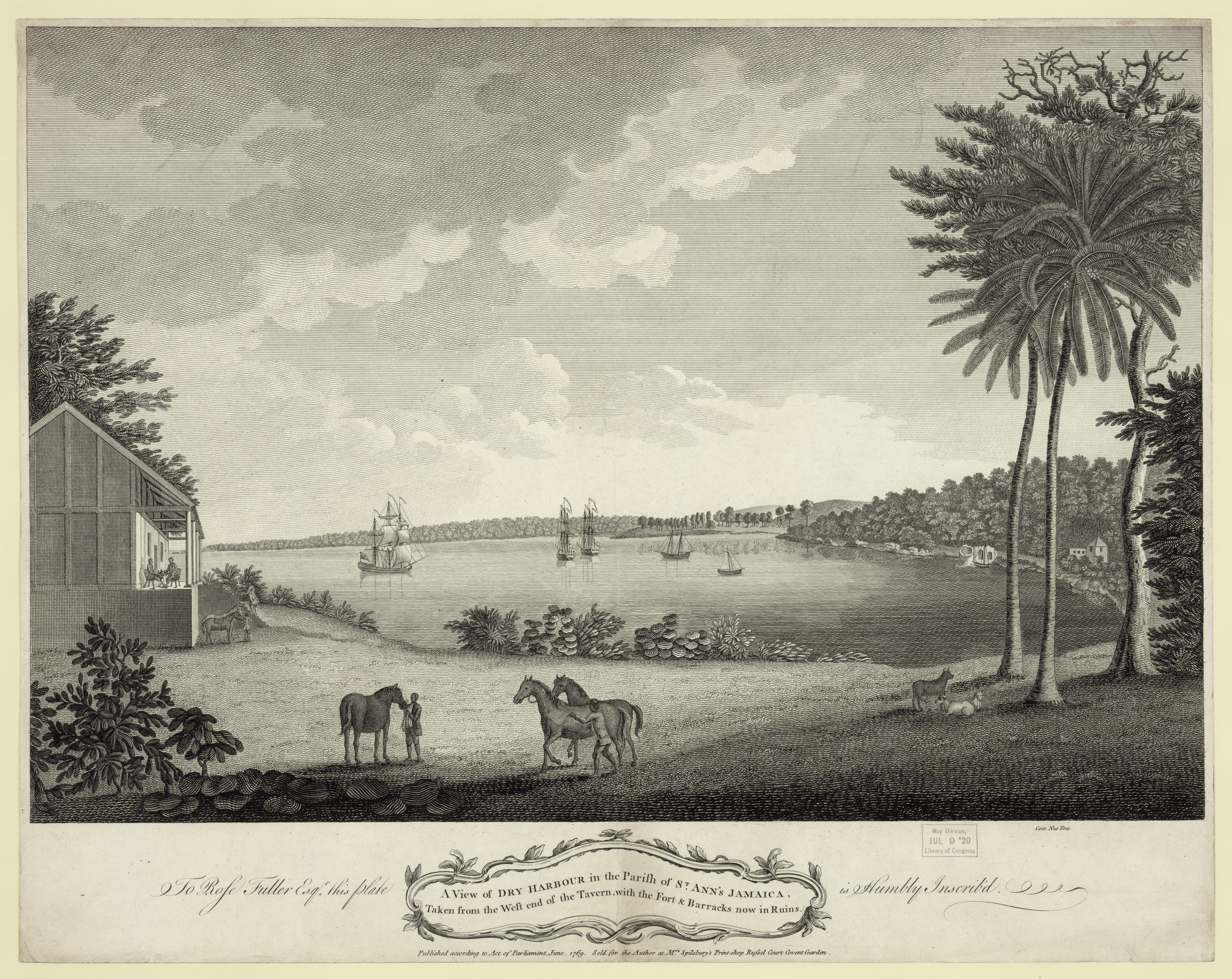
A view of Dry Harbour in the parish of St. Ann's Jamaica, taken from the West end of the tavern, with the fort and barracks now in ruins

The Dry Harbour Mountains are a range of mountains in north central Jamaica. More accurately described as a plateau than a true mountain range, they form the eastern boundary of the Cockpit Country. This is also the mountain that people used to go and pray. The Dry Harbour Mountains starts from Discovery Bay, St. Ann and covers most settlements all the way to the eastern end of the Cockpit Country. It is a mountain which abounds in limestone and bauxite. The soil type is latosol which is of red iron and aluminium oxide.

The Dry Harbour Mountains is some 670 metres (2,200 ft) above sea level and many areas are very cool. The area is covered in rich verdant pastures and numerous trees. In many areas the wet limestone forest is a riotous profuse of trees. Many prominent districts are part of this plateau region of Jamaica. Nine Mile, the home of Bob Marley; Alexandria; Aboukir; Clarksonville, Inverness; Tobolski; Gibraltar; Watt Town; Bethany; Murray Mountain (the marijuana centre) and McKenzie; Cascade; Battersea, the home of the famous Basil Robinson; Bohemia; Wild Cane are some of the numerous settlements in the Dry Harbour Mountains.

Aboukir is the birthplace of Harry Belafonte's mother and where Harry lived as a child.

== Mining controversy ==
The area has come under question in regard to a recent license granted by the Office of the Prime Minister through executive action after a denial of license by Jamaica's environmental regulator, flagging questions as to the appropriateness of the activity.
