= WINDALCO =

Jamaican alumina producer

The West Indies Alumina Company (WINDALCO) is a Jamaican alumina producer and wholly owned subsidiary of Russian aluminium giant United Company Rusal. It owns the oldest two alumina refineries that have been built on Jamaica, out of a total of five, of which four are still in existence.

== History ==
Windalco was incorporated in Jamaica on 1 June 2001, Glencore acquired the 93% interest of Alcan in the alumina business that had been established by Alcan in the 1950s. The government through its Jamaica Bauxite Mining Ltd. (jbm.gov.jm; est. 1975) retained its 7% interest. Windalco started operations on 7 June 2001.

The government's 7% interest had been acquired under an agreement dated 25 September 1978 by which the JAMALCAN joint venture was established. The capacity of the plants was then 1,118ktpa (559ktpa each), achieved in a 1967 ($37 million) expansion program, and which represented about 40% of the island's alumina output (40% Alpart, 40% Jamalcan, 20% Jamalco).

In 2007 Rusal took over control of Glencore's aluminum business. In December 2014 Rusal acquired the remaining 7% of Windalco from the government in exchange for $11 million, credited against an outstanding debt of $21.15 million owed by the government to Rusal. The Kirkvine and Ewarton Works had a combined capacity of 1,250ktpa and employed 600 workers.

The Kirkvine plant has been shut down since April 2009 (Great Recession). The Ewarton Works was shut down in 2009, but reopened on 22 July 2010. (as of 2026)

Jamaican alumina plants are considered global swing capacity due to their high cost of energy.

== Kirkvine Works ==
18.082°N 77.475°W

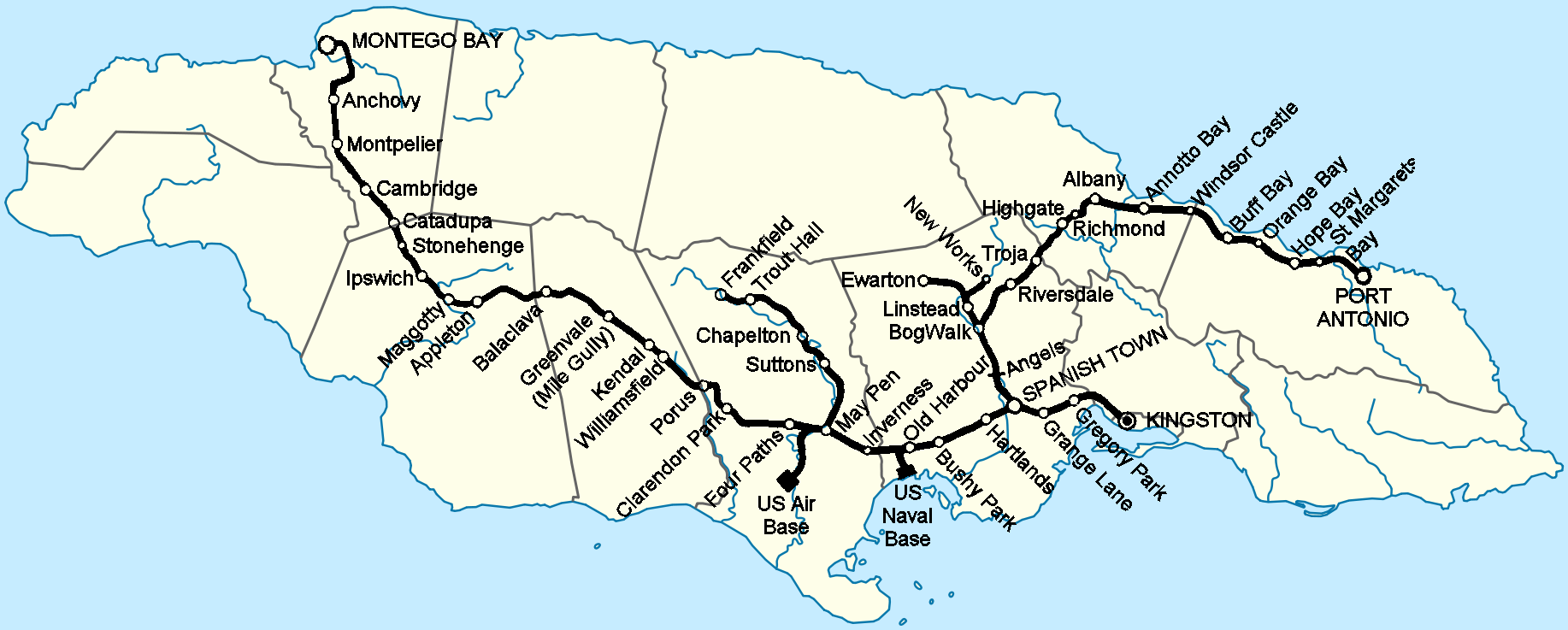
1945 rail network

Topography

The Kirkvine alumina plant was the first alumina plant built in Jamaica. It had a (pilot) capacity of 100 short tons per day (ca. 33ktpa) when the first shipment of alumina was made in January 1953 (via Kingston to Norway; 2,300 tons of bagged alumina was loaded onto the SS Trident, which sailed on 7 January 1953). The plant was built by Alumina Jamaica Ltd., wholly owned subsidiary of Aluminum Ltd (Montreal). The Engineering and Mining Journal published a detailed technical description of the standard Bayer process refinery in 1957. By then the $60 million plant had a capacity of 1,500 short tons per day (ca. 500ktpa). It had a 20,000kw oil burning captive power plant. Bauxite was mined from the immediate vicinity of the plant from discontinuous pockets in the underlying limestone up to 120ft deep under only a few inches of overburden. The top soil was saved and mined areas returned to nature. Alumina was shipped in bulk or in paper bags via 32 miles of railroad to Port Esquivel, where a deep water channel and turning basin had been dredged. A 600ft concrete+steel pier allowed the loading of 2 ships simultaneously at a depth of 32ft of water. As the new landlord of 50,000 acres, the company was engaged in extensive commercial agriculture production. Some 400,000 hardwood trees had been planted, 4,400 heads of beef cattle were grazed. A 170 acre citrus grove was enlarged to 450 acres and 2,800 acres of land were leased to 2,000 local tenants for food production. The first shipment from Port Esquivel was made in June 1953 on the SS Sunrell. A ca. 1966 aerial photo of the port:

Jamaica Bauxites Ltd was incorporated on 4 October 1943 as a wholly owned subsidiary of Aluminium Ltd and was renamed Alumina Jamaica Ltd on 27 October 1952.

Alcan announced the start of the detail planning and procurement phase on 24 August 1950. The company had secured a Economic Cooperation Administration loan and put $1.5 million of their own funds into the $8 million project to build a 100tpd pilot plant, with an estimated $30 million later required to increase capacity tenfold. The ECA loan was for $2,500,000 plus $4,200,000 (£1,500,000) in sterling counterpart funds at 4% interest repayable as aluminum ingots delivered to the US strategic stockpile.

The Kirkvine Works were depicted on the reverse of the J$10 bank note first issued in 1978.

== Ewarton Works ==
18.173°N 77.062°W

The plant began operations in September 1959. Its capacity was 270,000 tpa against Kirkvine's 540,000tpa. It was the second refinery commissioned in Jamaica.

== Aluminum industry in Jamaica ==
Bauxite and Alumina Operations in Jamaica (ca. 1979)
| Company | Ownership | Mine Site | Plant | | Port | | Capacity (tonnes) | |
| | | | Site | Since | Site | First shipment | Bauxite | Alumina |
|---|---|---|---|---|---|---|---|---|
| JAMALCAN | Alcan 93%; Govt 7% | Russel Place | Kirkvine | Nov 1952 | Port Esquivel | Jun 1953 | 2,687 | 562 |
| JAMALCAN | Alcan 93%; Govt 7% | Schwallemburg | Ewarton | Sep 1959 | Port Esquivel | Jun 1953 | 2,687 | 562 |
| JAMALCO | Alcoa 94%; Govt 6% | Breadnut Valley | Halse Hall | Apr 1972 | Rocky Point | | 1,270 | 550 |
| Alpart | Kaiser 36.5%; Reynolds 36.5%; Anaconda 27% | Essex Valley | Nain | Sep 1970 | Port Kaiser | | 3,117 | 1,130 |
| Kaiser Bauxite | Govt 51%; Kaiser 49% | Water Valley | Port Rhodes | 1967 | Port Rhodes | | 4,200 | 0 |
| Reynolds | Govt 51%; Reynolds 49% | Lydford | Lydford | 1952 | Ocho Rios | Jun 1952 | 3,100 | 0 |
| Total | | | | | | | 14,374 | 2,800 |
| Kaiser | 100% | | | 1953 | Port Kaiser | 1953 | ? | 0 |
| Revere Copper&Brass | 100% | Magotty | Magotty | Apr 1971 (defunct 1975) | Rocky Point | | (500) | (200) |

Bauxite and Alumina Production, 1953 - 1978 ('000 metric tons)
| Year | Bauxite (dry) | | | | Alumina | Note |
| Year | Produced | Shipped | Processed to Alumina | % | Shipped | Note |
|---|---|---|---|---|---|---|
| 1953 | 930 | 1,070 | 100 | 11 | 29 | |
| 1954 | 2,080 | 1,760 | 320 | 15 | 108 | |
| 1955 | 2,690 | 2,220 | 470 | 17 | 186 | |
| 1956 | 3,190 | 2,620 | 580 | 18 | 216 | |
| 1957 | 4,670 | 3,700 | 970 | 21 | 442 | SS Richard commissioned; Haiti operation starts shipments |
| 1958 | 5,810 | 4,880 | 930 | 16 | 379 | |
| 1959 | 5,210 | 4,260 | 940 | 18 | 405 | Ewarton refinery commissioned |
| 1960 | 5,840 | 4,210 | 1,620 | 28 | 676 | |
| 1961 | 6,770 | 5,050 | 1,720 | 25 | 714 | SS J, Louis commissioned |
| 1962 | 7,620 | 6,080 | 1,530 | 20 | 637 | |
| 1963 | 7,010 | 5,240 | 1,770 | 25 | 737 | Alcoa begins bauxite shipments |
| 1964 | 7,940 | 6,060 | 1,870 | 24 | 780 | |
| 1965 | 8,680 | 6,890 | 1,760 | 20 | 732 | |
| 1966 | 9,070 | 7,140 | 1,920 | 21 | 803 | |
| 1967 | 9,270 | 7,260 | 2,010 | 22 | 837 | |
| 1968 | 8,530 | 6,310 | 2,210 | 26 | 922 | |
| 1969 | 10,500 | 7,720 | 2,780 | 26 | 1,156 | Alpart refinery commissioned |
| 1970 | 12,000 | 7,700 | 4,310 | 36 | 1,716 | |
| 1971 | 12,440 | 7,710 | 4,730 | 38 | 1,811 | |
| 1972 | 12,540 | 7,160 | 5,380 | 43 | 2,135 | |
| 1973 | 13,600 | 7,390 | 6,210 | 46 | 2,416 | |
| 1974 | 15,330 | 8,000 | 7,330 | 48 | 2,805 | Bauxite Levy |
| 1975 | 11,570 | 5,480 | 6,090 | 53 | 2,374 | |
| 1976 | 10,200 | 6,200 | 4,000 | 39 | 1,600 | |
| 1977 | 11,430 | 6,350 | 5,080 | 44 | 2,035 | |
| 1978 | 11,730 | 6,440 | 5,290 | 45 | 2,150 | |

Early in 1943, one shipment of 2,500 tons of Bauxite was sent to the Alcan East St. Louis plant for testing.

In 1973 the International Atomic Energy Agency published a restricted-circulation nuclear power feasibility study for Jamaica, part of a series of surveys of developing countries' energy infrastructures. Bauxite and alumina operations as of end of 1971 accounted for 130 out of 176MW total installed capacity at all private power plants (companies + estates). Some plants used 50Hz, some used 60Hz systems. The Jamaica Public Service Co had 316MW installed, all but 21.3MW of hydropower generated from hydrocarbons. The bauxite/alumina companies however used about half of their fuel oil to generate process heat. The report includes a pretty map of the bauxite industry in 1972.

=== Reynolds Jamaica Mines ===
External videos
- Aluminum on the March (1956)

On 5 June 1952 Reynolds Jamaica Mines Ltd (incorporated 18 July 1949 in Delaware) sent Jamaica's first ever commercial bauxite shipment to the United States from their new terminal at Ocho Rios. Ore containing about 20% of moisture was first heated in the kilns of the drying plant. A 6-mile aerial tramway, 330 buckets of 1-ton capacity on a steel rope supported by 122 towers, (traveling at 150 yards per minute and delivering 125 long tons per hour), descended from an elevation of 1,920ft to sea level. Parallel to the tramway a pipe line for fuel was laid. Four diesel engines at the inland power plant could generate 2,400kw and supplied the terminal via a 13kV transmission line. Monohydrate bauxite was shipped to the Corpus Christi refinery, trihydrate to the Hurricane Creek refinery at Bauxite, Arkansas. Now a land lord over 50,000 acres, the company had already assembled a herd of 7,000 heads of beef cattle. The $14 million project was financed mostly through an Economic Cooperation Administration loan. The ECA in the agreement signed 24 January 1950 made available $5,963,000 plus £1,800,000 ($5,040,000) at 4% interest, repayable over 20 years in the form of ingots delivered to the US strategic stockpile at market prices. Reynolds contributed $1.5 million in addition to the $1 million already spent on gaining access to reserves in Jamaica, Haiti and Guyana. Prior to this, Reynolds only had access to deposits within 25 miles of the Hurricane Creek refinery, which were converted to a strategic stockpile to be preserved. In 1951 the ECA gave another $3,284,000 and $1,250,000 in sterling counterpart 11.5-year loans, which together with $450,000 of Reynold's capital was spent to increase the scope of the project from 410,000tpa to 750,000tpa. The operation was inaugurated in a ceremony on 9 January 1953. The initial 5-year mining license expired in 1957. On 22 March 1957 a new license was granted under which royalties and taxes on bauxite profits were fixed for the next 25 years. 50% of both items were a fixed sum per ton, 50% were an adjustment pegged to the US commodities market price of aluminum ingots. A $4 million expansion at Ocho Rios more than tripled the terminal capacity, which included building a distinctive 640ft long x 140ft wide x 93ft high 120,000-ton bauxite storehouse. A new $7 million 32,000-ton 17 knots self-unloading freighter (SS Richard) was put in service. The company's land holdings stood at 60,000 acres. A new bi-cable tramway was installed in addition to the old monocable tramway. The J. Louis, sister ship to Richard, was launched in Kure in 1961. By then the Richard had achieved a rate of 45.5 round trips per year. The Caribbean Steamship Co was incorporated in Panama on 20 May 1952.

Reynolds had bought the property at Lydford from Sir Alfred DaCosta, who in 1942 had sent a sample of his soil to a London laboratory to inquire why it was unsuitable for farming. The high alumina concentration in the sample led to Alcan's prospecting expedition and thus set the gears in motion for the Jamaican bauxite industry. Reynolds started exploration and land acquisitions in 1944. In 1966 a conveyor belt system was installed to double the transport capacity to Ocho Rios and the tramway was scrapped.

Reynolds on 28 February 1984 announced their partial withdrawal from Jamaica. While they continued their involvement in the Alpart refinery, the Ocho Rios operation was scheduled to terminate during April - June 1984. The Worsley alumina complex in Western Australia was coming online later in 1984 and the Jamaican operation ceased to be cost-competitive. The government expected a $100 million fiscal budget deficit and a $30 million foreign exchange deficit from this withdrawal. The company in 1984 was still called Reynolds Jamaica Mines.

In 1973 Reynolds was the largest producer of beef on the island with a herd of 14,000 heads of cattle. Also produced were poultry, hogs, coffee (100 acres) and large forests of hardwood trees. Lydford Enterprises Ltd., incorporated in Canada on 19 May 1952, was engaged in the business of livestock feed production, meat processing and cold storage, product sales, and tourism.

The 13,400-ton self-unloading newly built bulk carrier SS Carl Schmedeman departed for her first run on 21 October 1952. She was anticipated to ship 580,000tpa, could make the round trip to Mobile in 8.5 days and (in the ballast tanks) could carry cargo fuel oil on the return trip. Another ship that was purchased was the 7,000 ton Dragon. The Schmedeman's self-unloading system consisted of two conveyor belts running the length of the ship below the cargo holds. They rose to main deck level at the aft and dumped the ore onto a single perpendicular reversible shuttle conveyor that could discharge to either port or starboard. Maximum unload rate was 1,400 tons per hour. Not many people know this.

The SS Richard, after making three coal runs from Newport News to Amsterdam in the Summer of 1957, received its first bauxite load at Ocho Rios on 14 July 1957 and made the voyage in 81 hours. Ocho Rios could load at 4,000 tons per hour, Corpus Christi could discharge at 2,200 tons per hour and typical round trip time was 7.5 days. On 15 October 1959 (823 days later), Richard made her 100th delivery, bringing her total to 3.1 million long tons.

The Corpus Christi refinery received its first ore shipment on 29 March 1953 and began production in June at a rate of 1,000 tons per day. Capacity was increased to 1,500tpd in October 1957 and work began on an increase to 2,000tpd to be ready in October 1958.

Reynolds Haitian Mines, Inc. (incorporated 1 November 1955 in Delaware) began shipping ore from their pier in Miragoâne (18.4498°N 73.1069°W) to Corpus Christi in 1957. The mines at elevation of 2,000-3,000ft were some 6 to 12 miles of trucking distance from the port. Reynolds had invested $8 million in the operation. Reynolds took over business on 1 January 1956, mining operations commenced on 18 July 1956, but the drying plant at the terminal was not finished until March 1957. It had a capacity of 1,200,000tpa, but was scheduled to begin production at 400,000tpa (i.e. truckers were prepared to switch from one shift to three shifts). Activities of Reynolds Haitian Mines ended in 1982. No other company mined bauxite in Haiti during that time.

Reynold's third overseas mining operation was in Guyana. Ore was processed and silica removed in a concentration plant at Kwakwani and then shipped by barges 138 miles down the Berbice River for transfer to oceangoing carriers. Because the ore resembled Arkansas bauxite, it was shipped 2,820 miles to Mobile and then over 400 miles of railroad to the Hurricane Creek refinery. Reynolds had taken over the Berbice Bauxite Co in December 1952 (from American Cyanamid Co), the smaller of the two active bauxite mining companies. The other one, Demerara Bauxite Co, a subsidiary of Alcan, was incorporated in British Guiana on 18 September 1916 and had been mining since 1917 from the Three Friends deposit and by 1923 had established a complete operation of ore crusher, washer, drying plant and ocean vessel loading dock at Mackenzie, 10 miles north of the deposit to which it was connected by a railroad. The drying plant had a capacity of 44 tons per hour and 69 ships were loaded in 1928. Because a large bar at the mouth of the river limited the size of ship that could make the journey upstream, a deepwater transshipment hub was later established at Chaguaramas (Chaguaramas Terminals Ltd incorporated as an Alcan subsidiary on 7 May 1942 chagterms.com). In March 1961 a BWI$65 million alumina refinery (6.01635°N 58.29966°W) built at Mackenzie began shipments, principally to Port Alfred for delivery to Alcan's Arvida smelter. In December 1947 construction commenced of a second transshipment terminal with 75,000 tons storage capacity in Carenage, costing $5 million, unloading inbound shallow draft vessels at 1,200tph and loading ocean carriers at 2,000tph. Reynolds Guyana Mines Ltd (incorp. in Delaware in January 1967) was nationalized on 1 January 1975. A compensation of $10 million was paid in the form of 1.5% 13-year promissory notes for the assets with a book value of $14.5 million. The Overseas Private Investment Corporation bought the notes and made Reynolds whole with $4,564,000 in cash out of its insurance reserve and with $5,436,000 from the proceeds of a resale of some of the notes (plus an OPIC guarantee) to the Federal Financing Bank.

Walter L. Rice, president of the above mentioned companies, wrote an article about Reynold's bauxite mining operations for the Mining Congress Journal in 1957.

Richard-class ore carrier
| Length over all | 669.5ft |
| Length between perpendiculars | 635ft |
| Breadth moulded | 90ft |
| Depth moulded | 51ft |
| Draught | 34.6ft |
| Deadweight | 32,490 |
| Gross tons | 19,999 |
| Net tons | 12,651 |
| Power | 12,500shp |
| Service speed | 15.75kn |

The Reynolds Ocho Rios pier stood in as the lair of Dr. No in the 1962 James Bond movie.

=== Alcoa Minerals of Jamaica ===
Alcoa Minerals of Jamaica, Inc. (incorporated 10 June 1960 in Delaware) on 31 May 1960 took over a mining lease from Caribex Ltd, covering 50.5 square miles in Northern Clarendon in the Mocho Mountains area. The government on 15 December 1961 granted a 25-year license requiring the start of commercial mining by 31 May 1963 under substantially the same regulatory and royalty conditions that applied to Reynolds and Kaiser. An 18.8 mile company owned railway was built to the new terminal at Rocky Point (17.8165°N 77.142°W), over which the Jamaica Railway Corporation handled the haulage. The deepwater port with the ore drying plant were built in an abandoned swamp area. A distinctive 100ft high 300ft diameter white dome was built to stockpile dried bauxite. Tubes for the skeleton and sheet for the cover were made from aluminum alloy. The unusual shape was chosen to minimize the spatial footprint and thus reduce dredging requirements. Shipments were made to Alcoa's Point Comfort refinery. Deliveries to the port began in June and the first shipment to Point Comfort was made in November 1963. The Point Comfort refinery had received its first load of bauxite in January 1959 from Alcoa's new $14 million operation at Cabo Rojo. Ocean freighters unloaded at a terminal at Harbor Island, from where barges completed the last 70 miles of the haul.

The company as of 2026 mines bauxite from in the Mount Oliphant plateau and from Harmons Valley. The ore is loaded into railcars at the St. Jago railhead (17.9469°N 77.38187°W). The original railway into the Mocho Mountain area apparently was dismantled and new track were laid to divert the line westwards from this point: 17.91289°N 77.26933°W.

External videos
- Jamalco's aerial rope conveyor

A 3.4km aerial Doppelmayr rope conveyor completed in 2008 can move 1,000 tons per hour, but typically moves 3.2 million tpa. The bauxite travels 18 minutes and the material while it descends from the plateau generates electricity by driving an electromagnetic brake. The system eliminates truck fuel usage, is very quiet and creates no dust pollution.

== International Bauxite Association ==
The IBA was established in Conakry on 8 March 1974. It came into force on 29 July 1975 after all member states had ratified.

IBA member states
| Country | Bauxite Production ('000 long tons) | | |
| Country | 1971 | 1972 | 1973 |
|---|---|---|---|
| Australia | 12,532 | 14,209 | 17,535 |
| Guinea | 1,966 | 2,018 | 3,000 |
| Guyana | 3,858 | 3,291 | 3,224 |
| Yugoslavia | 1,928 | 2,162 | 2,133 |
| Jamaica | 12,244 | 12,345 | 13,385 |
| Surinam | 6,612 | 7,654 | 6,580 |
| Sierra Leone | 581 | 683 | 652 |
| IBA states | 39,721 | 42,362 | 46,509 |
| World | 61,143 | 64,021 | 68,563 |
| IBA % | 65 | 66.2 | 67.8 |
