= Clarke Trott =

Bermudian cricketer

Personal information
- Full name: Clarke Trott
- Born: Unknown
- Batting: Unknown
- Bowling: Unknown

Domestic team information
- Years: Team
- 1999/00: Bermuda

Career statistics
Competition	List A
Matches	3
Runs scored	15
Batting average	5.00
100s/50s	–/–
Top score	7
Balls bowled	120
Wickets	1
Bowling average	93.00
5 wickets in innings	–
10 wickets in match	–
Best bowling	1/32
Catches/stumpings	3/–
- Source: Cricinfo, 31 March 2013

Clarke Trott (date of birth unknown) is a former Bermudian cricketer. Trott's batting and bowling styles are unknown.

Trott made his debut for Bermuda in a List A match against Jamaica in the 1999/00 Red Stripe Bowl, with him making two further List A appearances in that tournament, against Guyana and the Windward Islands. He scored a total of 15 runs in his three List A matches, at an average of 5.00 and a high score of 7. With the ball he also took a single wicket.
