= Dave Cumberbatch =

Barbadian cricketer (born 1964)

Personal information
- Born: 26 September 1964 (age 62); Saint Peter, Barbados
- Source: Cricinfo, 13 November 2020

Dave Cumberbatch (born 26 September 1964) is a Barbadian cricketer. He played in six first-class and four List A matches for the Barbados cricket team from 1983 to 2003.

== See also ==
- List of Barbadian representative cricketers
