= Colin Cannonier =

Kittitian sportsman

Personal information
- Full name: Colin Darren Cannonier
- Born: 22 May 1973 (age 53); Basseterre, Saint Kitts
- Batting: Right-handed
- Bowling: Right-arm medium
- Role: Batsman

Domestic team information
- Years: Team
- 1996–2001: Leeward Islands
- 2002: Rest of Leeward Islands
- Source: CricketArchive, 28 December 2015

Colin Darren Cannonier (born 22 May 1973) is an economics professor from Saint Kitts. He is also known for his sporting career, which included cricket for the Leeward Islands and club football in the Saint Kitts Premier Division.

Cannonier was born in Basseterre, and educated at Basseterre High School. He made his first-class cricket debut for the Leeward Islands during the 1995–96 Busta Cup, and played a total of four times in his first season, including in his team's defeat of Trinidad and Tobago in the competition final. Cannonier was awarded a scholarship to the University of the West Indies in 1996, and consequently did not again appear for the Leeward Islands until the 1999–00 Red Stripe Bowl (a limited-overs competition). The 2000–01 season was his last with the Leewards, but in the 2002–03 Red Stripe Bowl he represented the "Rest of Leeward Islands" side that played during Antigua and Barbuda's period as a separate team. Cannonier's final high-level cricket matches came at the Stanford 20/20 competition in 2006 and 2008, where he represented the Saint Kitts national team. He never made the Saint Kitts national football team, but did captain his club side, Basseterre's Newtown United.

After graduating from the University of the West Indies, Cannonier worked for a period as an economist and statistician with the Eastern Caribbean Central Bank. In 2005, he moved to the United States to study for a master's degree in development economics at Williams College, Massachusetts. He later completed a second master's degree at Louisiana State University, where he eventually gained his doctorate. Cannonier is currently an associate professor at Belmont University, Tennessee, and has published papers in the fields of international economics, health economics, and sport economics.
