= Alvin La Feuille =

West Indies cricketer (born 1978)

Alvin La Feuille (born 16 December 1978 in St Lucia) is a West Indies cricketer who played for the Windward Islands. Between 2003 and 2007, he played fourteen matches for the Islands, and also played in two Twenty20 matches for St Lucia. A right-handed batsman and wicket-keeper, La Feuille's highest score in first-class cricket was 70, made in the second-innings against the Leeward Islands.
