= Damian Mills =

Canadian cricketer (1979–2003)

Personal information
- Born: 15 July 1979
- Died: 17 November 2003 (aged 24); Winnipeg, Manitoba, Canada
- Batting: Right-handed

Domestic team information
- Years: Team
- 1999/00–2000/01: Canada

Career statistics
Competition	List A
Matches	3
Runs scored	31
Batting average	10.33
100s/50s	–/–
Top score	15
Balls bowled	–
Wickets	–
Bowling average	–
5 wickets in innings	–
10 wickets in match	–
Best bowling	–
Catches/stumpings	1/–
- Source: CricketArchive, 14 October 2011

Damian Mills (15 July 1979 – 17 November 2003) was a Canadian international cricketer. He was a right-handed opening batsman and right-arm medium bowler.

== Early life ==
Damian Mills was born on 15 July 1979, the son of Dr. Barry Mills and Rona Mills. He had two sisters, Cressida and Eleanor. His enthusiasm for cricket started in 1985 during a family visit to England, when he saw his first cricket match. Before the family returned from their vacation Damian's father presented him with a size-2 junior cricket bat. Dr. Mills strongly encouraged young Damian's interest in cricket.

Mills graduated from St. Paul's High School.

== Domestic cricket ==
=== Club ===
Mills started to play organized cricket in 1986 at age seven at Lincoln Elementary School. In 1989 he joined the Manitoba Cricket Association Junior League. In 1992 he made his first appearance in the MCA Senior League. He was a member of the Winnipeg Juniors Cricket Club (WJCC) but played only two league games that year. During 1993 he became a regular member of the WJCC, mainly as a bowler. Due to injuries he gave up bowling and concentrated on his batting, which made his mark in cricket.

=== Representative ===
In 1992, days before his 13th birthday, Mills became a member of the Manitoba Junior Provincial Team and for the first time tried out for the Canadian national youth team in Toronto. He was amongst the youngest athletes at the trials and whilst he did not make the team, he gained experience. On the first day of the tournament during the morning practice session, Mills was hit very hard in the head by a ball, and spent the rest of the day in the emergency room of a Toronto hospital. The next day he played very hard throughout the tournament, despite his injury.

In 1994, Mills was invited by the Manitoba Cricket Association (MCA) to the MCA Senior Training Camp. The camp took place during the winter months.

In 1995, Mills first represented Manitoba on the Senior Provincial Team in the Western Provincial Championship, when he opened the batting against British Columbia and scored 42 runs. Returning from this competition at age 16 he scored his first century in the MCA Senior League: 111 runs not out. Since that time, Damian was an integral member of the Manitoba Senior Provincial Team.

== International cricket ==
Mills represented Canada for the first time in 1997 in the final International Youth Tournament in Bermuda. He again represented Canada in 1998 at The NorTel West Indies Youth Tournament in Trinidad and Tobago.

In 1999, Mills was selected for two Canadian teams: Canada Under-23; and the Canadian National Senior Team. He played for Canada in the West Indies Cricket Board’s Red Stripe Bowl competition in Antigua from October 1999 and again in 2000.

Also in 2000, Damian was selected by Ilford Cricket Club from England for a tour to India. He spent one winter playing in New Zealand.

== Off-field activity ==
=== Cricket ===
Mills was dedicated to the promotion of the sport and the development of youth cricketers. He was a coach at junior camps, schools, community centers and tournaments. He also made time to be an administrator of the sport. He was committed to an increasingly strong cricket program in Manitoba.

=== Study ===
Mills started studies toward a Degree in Business Studies in 1997. Due to competing demands from cricket, he was expected to have graduated in April 2005 from the University of Manitoba.

=== Religion ===
Mills was a church altar server from 8 to 21 years of age. During this time he helped to train young servers.

== Death ==
Mills died unexpectedly in his sleep on Monday 17 November 2003, at the age of 24. He had not been ill and there was no undetected medical condition.

=== Legacy ===
The Damian Mills Junior Cricket Foundation was established in Mills' honor. The fund's purpose is to continue Damian's work in promoting the sport of cricket and to serve as a source of encouragement and inspiration to young cricketers.

== Career highlights ==
=== Teams ===
- Canada
- Canada U-23
- Canada U-19
- Manitoba, Manitoba U-25
- The Winnipeg Juniors Cricket Club
- Lincoln Elementary School

=== Major Tours ===
- 1995: Western Canada Provincial Tournament, Vancouver
- 1997: International Youth Tournament, Bermuda
- 1998: Nortel West Indies Youth Tournament, Trinidad and Tobago
- 1999: Canada U-23 vs Bermuda, Toronto
- 1999: WICB Red Stripe Bowl, Antigua
- 1999: Four month training tour in New Zealand
- 2000: WICB Red Stripe Bowl, Jamaica
- 2000: Ilford Cricket Club (England) tour of India
- 1996–2003: Western Canada Under-25 Provincial Championship, Edmonton

=== Accomplishments ===
- In 1997, Mills scored the most runs in the Manitoba Senior League, repeating this performance five more times; in 1998, 1999, 2001, 2002 and in his final season, 2003.
- He was rated Best Batsman of the MCA League: 1999, 2001, 2003
- He scored the most runs in the MCA League: 1997, 1998, 1999, 2001, 2002, 2003
- He was the Most Outstanding Canadian Junior Cricketer of 1998, and the Outstanding Manitoba Junior Cricketer: 1996, 1997
- Mills also won many batting awards at the Western Canada Provincial U-25 Championships, MCA Indoor League and shares a Canadian Junior Record for highest opening partnership of 143 runs from the 1997 IYT in Bermuda.
