= Staying Power: The History of Black People in Britain =

1984 book by Peter Fryer

- Author: Peter Fryer
- Language: English
- Subject: Black British history
- Published: 1984; 42 years ago
- Publisher: Pluto Press
- Publication place: United Kingdom
- Media type: Print
- Pages: 656
- ISBN: 9780745338316

Staying Power: The History of Black People in Britain is a book written by Peter Fryer that is considered a definitive history of the Black presence in Britain, beginning with the Roman conquest. First published by Pluto Press in 1984, Staying Power was reissued in 2010 in a new edition with a foreword by Gary Younge and introduction by Paul Gilroy "explaining the genesis of the book and its continuing significance in black history today".

== Reception ==
As stated by Rob Waters in his article "Thinking Black: Peter Fryer's Staying Power and the Politics of Writing Black British History in the 1980s" (2016), published in History Workshop Journal: "The book was widely praised at the time of publication for its historical reach and magisterial prose, and it has remained a foundational text of black British history."

Notable writers and scholars who have endorsed Staying Power include C. L. R. James ("Rare in its mastery"), David Olusoga ("Encyclopedic, courageous and passionately written.... Everyone who has researched or written on the subject since its publication in 1984 owes something to Fryer'") and Salman Rushdie ("An invaluable book, which manages the rare feat of combining scholarship with readability").

Historian David Horsley notes that it is strange the book has no mention of leading black civil rights leader Billy Strachan, a man whom Fryer would most likely have known personally during his time in the Communist Party of Great Britain.

== Contents ==
The author's Preface begins with the sentence: "Black people – by whom I mean Africans and Asians and their descendants – have been living in Britain for close on 500 years." Twelve chapters follow:

1. "'Those Kinde of People'"
2. "'Necessary Implements'"
3. "Britain's Slave Ports"
4. "The Black Community Takes Shape"
5. "Eighteenth-Century Voices"
6. "Slavery and the Law"
7. "The Rise of English Racism"
8. "Up from Slavery"
9. "Challenges to Empire"
10. "Under Attack"
11. "The Settlers"
12. "The New Generation"
