= Virgil Browne =

Nevisian cricketer (born 1974)

Personal information
- Full name: Virgil Anthony Browne
- Born: 9 September 1974 (age 52); Camps Village, Nevis
- Bowling: Slow left-arm orthodox

Domestic team information
- Years: Team
- 2003–04: Leeward Islands
- 2006: Nevis

Career statistics
| Competition | FC | LA | T20 |
|---|---|---|---|
| Matches | 6 | 2 | 2 |
| Runs scored | 104 | 5 | – |
| Batting average | 17.33 | 5.00 | – |
| 100s/50s | 0/0 | 0/0 | – |
| Top score | 33 | 5 | – |
| Balls bowled | 1,294 | 72 | 48 |
| Wickets | 20 | 0 | 2 |
| Bowling average | 31.75 | – | 27.50 |
| 5 wickets in innings | 1 | 0 | 0 |
| 10 wickets in match | 1 | – | – |
| Best bowling | 8/129 | – | 1/17 |
| Catches/stumpings | 5/– | 0/– | 1/– |
- Source: Cricinfo, 21 April 2024

Virgil Anthony Browne (born 9 September 1974) is a former Nevisian cricketer. He played in six first-class and two List A matches for Leeward Islands in the 2003–04 season, and in two Twenty20 matches for Nevis in 2006.

On his first-class debut, Browne, a slow left-arm orthodox spin bowler, took 8 for 129 and 2 for 84 against Trinidad and Tobago. It was the first time any bowler had taken eight wickets in an innings on first-class debut in the West Indies Championship.
