= Kensington Park, Kingston =

Cricket ground in Kingston, Jamaica

Kensington Park
- Interactive map of Kensington Park

Ground information
- Location: Kingston, Jamaica
- Country: Jamaica
- Coordinates: 17.9742°N 76.7691°W
- Establishment: 1901

Team information
| Jamaica | (1908/09–2010/11) |
- As of 25 April 2022; Source: Ground profile

Kensington Park is a cricket ground in Kingston, Jamaica.

== History ==
The Kensington Cricket Club was founded in 1880 as St Andrew Juniors Cricket Club and originally played their home matches in Kingston at Camperdown. The following year Cosmo Lorenzo Dicks was appointed captain and moved the club from Kingston to his property, 'Kensington', at Sligoville in Saint Catherine Parish. The club was then renamed to Kingston Cricket Club. In 1892, the club returned to Kensington and played their home matches at Winchester Park for nine years, before moving to Kensington Park in 1901. For much of its history the Jamaica Cricket Association was based at the ground. Kensington Park first played host to first-class cricket in February 1909, when Jamaica played the touring Philadelphians, with the Philadelphians H. V. Hordern taking 16 wickets in the match. All of the buildings at the ground were destroyed by Hurricane Charlie in 1951, but were rebuilt. In 1979, the club house was destroyed by fire, while in 2004 Hurricane Ivan caused damage to the roof of the new club house. Major cricket returned to the Park following an 89 year break in 1998, when three List A one-day matches were played there in the 1998–99 Red Stripe Bowl. Jamaica returned to the Park in 2000, playing a one-day match against a touring South Africa A team. A further two one-day matches were played there in the 2003–04 Red Stripe Bowl, with first-class cricket returning to the Park following a 94 year gap, with Jamaica playing Guyana in the 2004–05 Carib Beer Cup. Jamaica played first-class matches at Kensington Park until 2010, with a further five one-day matches being played there to 2010.

== Records ==
=== First-class ===
- Highest team total: 410 for 6 declared by Jamaica v Guyana, 2004–05
- Lowest team total: 84 all out by Jamaica v Philadelphians, 1908–09
- Highest individual innings: 110 by Tamar Lambert for Jamaica v Guyana, 2006–07
- Best bowling in an innings: 8-31 by H. V. Hordern for Philadelphians v Jamaica, 1908–09
- Best bowling in a match: 16-86 by H. V. Horden, as above

=== List A ===
- Highest team total: 330 for 4 (50 overs) by Leeward Islands v United States, 1998–99
- Lowest team total: 48 all out (26.3 overs) by Bermuda v Windward Islands, 1999–00
- Highest individual innings: 126 by Wilden Cornwall for Leeward Islands v United States, 1998–99
- Best bowling in an innings: 5-35 by Richard Basden for Bermuda v Windward Islands, 1999–00

== See also ==
- List of cricket grounds in the West Indies
