= Shazam Babwah =

Trinidadian cricketer (born 1977)

Personal information
- Born: 7 July 1977 (age 49); Trinidad
- Source: Cricinfo, 27 November 2020

Shazam Babwah (born 7 July 1977) is a Trinidadian cricketer. He played in twelve first-class, twelve List A, and five Twenty20 matches for Trinidad and Tobago from 2002 to 2006.

== See also ==
- List of Trinidadian representative cricketers
