= Rishi Bachan =

Trinidadian cricketer (born 1986)

Rishi Bachan (born 4 November 1986 in Barrackpore, Trinidad and Tobago), his bowling style is slow left arm offbreak, and is a right-handed batsman. He is a West Indies cricketer who played in the 2006 U-19 Cricket World Cup in Sri Lanka. He played at Stanford Cricket Ground, Coolidge, Antigua on 25 October 2008 where he took 1 wicket (4 overs). He then played Jamaica v Trinidad & Tobago at Providence, Nov 21, 2008 where he bowled for 6 overs and took 2 wickets.
