= Peter Fryer =

English writer and journalist (1927–2006)

- Born: 18 February 1927; Hull, England
- Died: 31 October 2006 (aged 79)
- Occupations: Writer and journalist
- Notable work: Staying Power: The History of Black People in Britain (1984)

Peter Fryer (18 February 1927 – 31 October 2006) was an English Marxist writer and journalist. Among his most influential works is the 1984 book Staying Power: The History of Black People in Britain.

== Early life ==
Peter Fryer was born near Hull on 18 February 1927. He was the son of a master mariner. He was awarded a scholarship to attend Hymers College in 1938. After joining the Young Communist League in 1942, he left school in 1943 to become a reporter on the Yorkshire Post.

In 1945, Fryer became a member of the Communist Party. In 1947 he was dismissed from his job after refusing to leave the party.

== Journalism and books ==
In 1948, Fryer joined the staff of the Daily Worker, becoming its parliamentary correspondent and covering foreign affairs. He also contributed to the American paper of the same name.

=== Hungarian Tragedy ===
In 1949, he reported on the show trial of the Hungarian communist László Rajk, who had falsely confessed to being an agent of Tito and others. After Rajk's execution and eventual "rehabilitation" early in 1956, Fryer felt guilty about having reported the coerced confession, and gave a letter of resignation to his editor, Johnny Campbell. Campbell persuaded him to continue working for a year's notice period.

In October 1956, Fryer was sent to Hungary to cover the uprising. His dispatches, including a description of the suppression of the uprising by Soviet troops, were either heavily censored or suppressed. He wrote a book about the uprising, Hungarian Tragedy (1956). Fryer was expelled from the Communist Party for criticising Hungarian Tragedy's suppression in the "capitalist" press. Many members left the party during the crisis that followed.

Fryer then became the editor of The Newsletter, the journal of The Club, a Trotskyist organisation led by Gerry Healy, and with Healy was a founder member of the Socialist Labour League. Fryer quit the SLL in 1959, with a very poor view of the organisation's leadership. Fryer worked away from organised politics until 1985, when he began writing a weekly column for the Workers Press.

=== Staying Power ===
In 1948, Fryer covered the arrival at Tilbury Docks in Britain of HMT Empire Windrush bringing settlers from the Caribbean. He maintained a long standing interest in black history and music. Peter Fraser wrote of Fryer: "In 1981, he attended a conference on the history of blacks in Britain to deliver a paper on black musicians. He went away convinced that the larger story needed to be told."

His interests eventually led to him writing the substantial and influential book, Staying Power: The History of Black People in Britain (1984). This book discussed the long history of black people in Britain as well as the racist structures that were created by white British capitalists for their own economic benefit. It had a substantial section of notes and appendices.

Subsequent publications on the same theme by Fryer include: Black People in the British Empire (1988), Aspects of British Black History (1993), The Politics of Windrush (1999), and Rhythms and Resistance (2000).

Fryer received some criticism for being a white man writing a substantial work on black history. Some critics such as Ziggi Alexander came to feel mutual respect and value Fryer's contributions.

== Later life ==
At the time of his death, Fryer was working on a study of life in Mississippi in the 19th and 20th centuries, under the working title Behind the Blues. He intended this book to rework black American history and hoped that it would be as influential as Staying Power had been. He had also just found out that he was to be honoured by the Hungarian government, in recognition of his "continuous support of the Hungarian revolution and freedom fight".

He died on 31 October 2006, aged 79.

== Honours and legacy ==
Fryer was posthumously awarded the Knight's Cross of the Order of Merit of the Republic of Hungary at a reception at the Hungarian Embassy in London.

On 26 June 2023, a blue plaque (organised by the Nubian Jak Community Trust) was unveiled in Fryer's honour outside a former residence of his in Highgate, London.
