= Ryan Hurley =

West Indian cricketer (born 1975)

Cricket information
- Batting: Right-handed
- Bowling: Right-arm offbreak

Career statistics
Competition	ODI
Matches	9
Runs scored	13
Batting average	3.25
100s/50s	0/0
Top score	6
Balls bowled	63
Wickets	5
Bowling average	62.60
5 wickets in innings	0
10 wickets in match	0
Best bowling	1/25
Catches/stumpings	5/–
- Source: Cricinfo, 6 March 2006

Ryan Hurley (born 13 September 1975) is a former West Indian cricketer who played nine One Day Internationals in 2003–04. He made his ODI debut in May 2003 against Australia where he took 1 for 57 and was run out without facing a ball. He was born at Springhead, Barbados in 1975.
