= Richard Basden =

Bermudian cricketer (born 1967)

Personal information
- Born: 20 June 1967 (age 59); Bermuda

International information
- National side: Bermuda

Domestic team information
- Years: Team
- 1999/00–2000/01: Bermuda

Career statistics
| Competition | List A |
|---|---|
| Matches | 6 |
| Runs scored | 116 |
| Batting average | 38.66 |
| 100s/50s | 0/0 |
| Top score | 44* |
| Balls bowled | 258 |
| Wickets | 9 |
| Bowling average | 18.33 |
| 5 wickets in innings | 1 |
| 10 wickets in match | 0 |
| Best bowling | 5/35 |
| Catches/stumpings | 0/– |
- Source: CricketArchive, 13 October 2011

Richard Basden (born 20 June 1967) is a Bermudian former cricketer. He played six List A matches for Bermuda as part of the Red Stripe Bowl. He also played in the 2001 ICC Trophy, which was his last international appearance.
