= Discovery Bay, Jamaica =

Town in Jamaica

Coordinates: 18°28′N 77°24′W

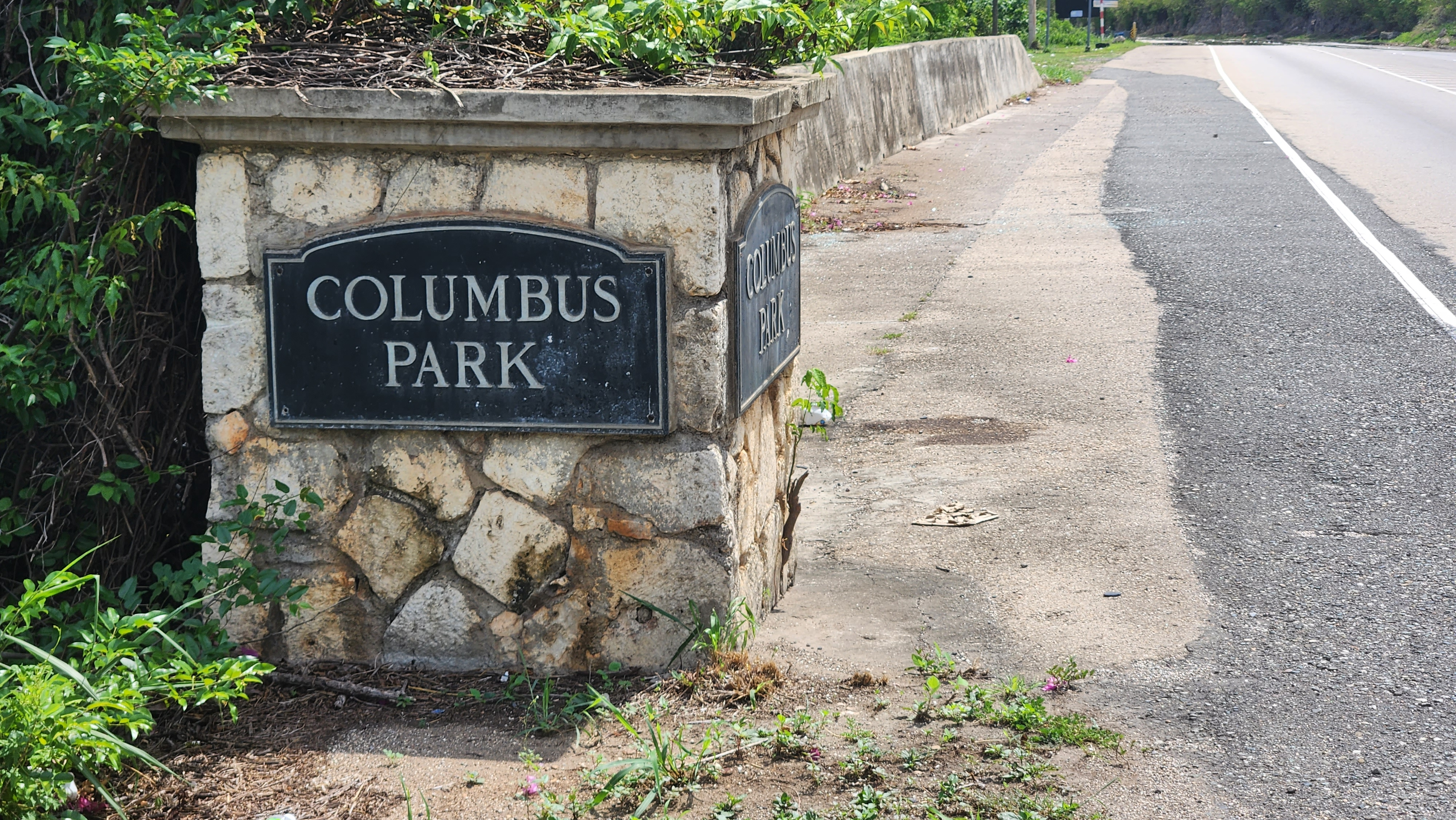
Columbus Park HighwayMarker

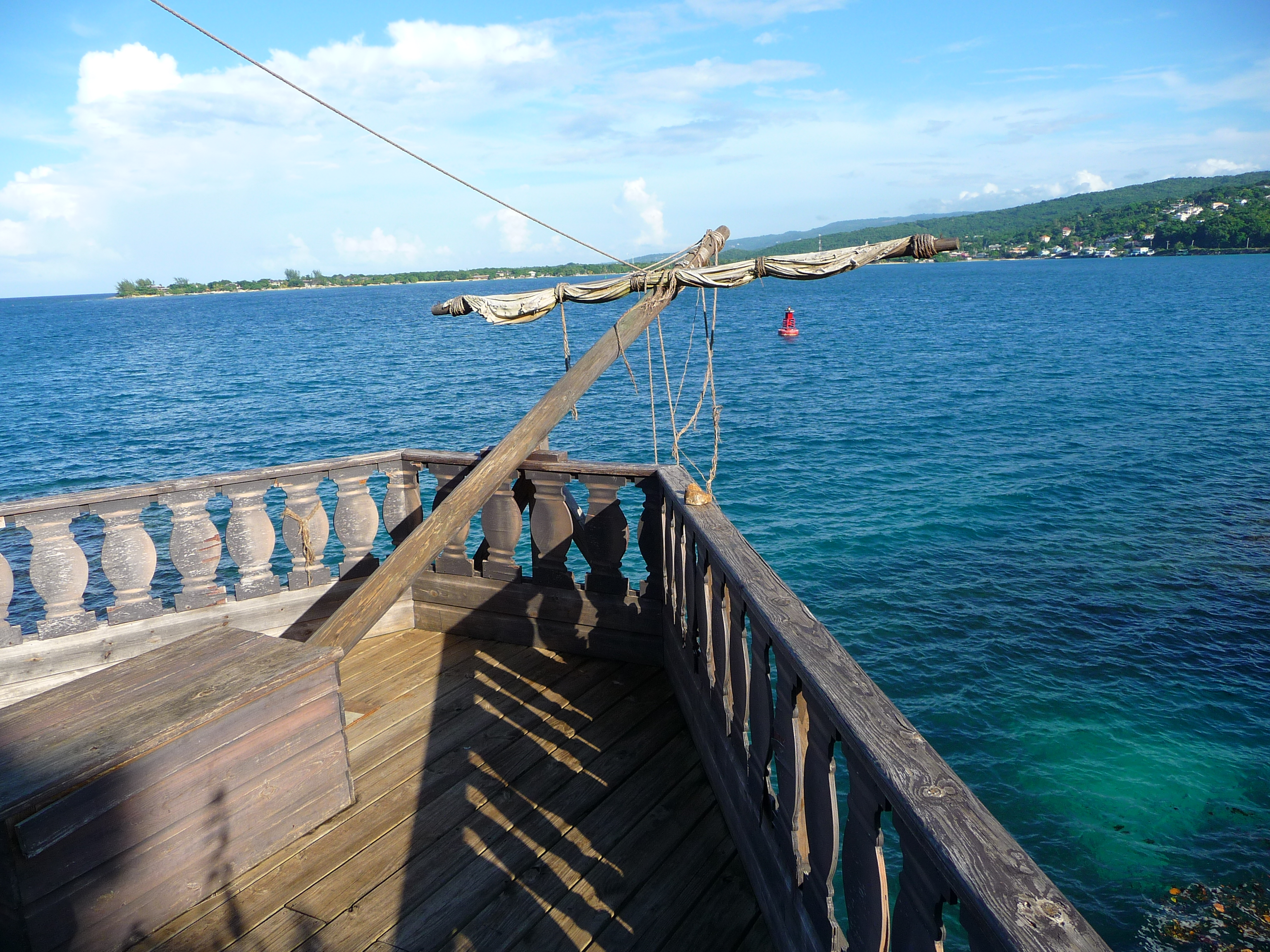
Discovery Bay, Jamaica, 2011

Discovery Bay is a town in Saint Ann Parish on the northern coast of Jamaica. The city is also known locally as Dry Harbour, and gives its name to the Dry Harbour Mountains in St. Ann. There is a dispute as to whether Christopher Columbus first landed in Discovery Bay or Sevilla la Nueva (east of Discovery Bay) in 1494. Near to the city are Puerto Seco Beach and several historic sites, such as the Green Grotto Caves and Columbus Park. Visitors to the Green Grotto Caves can see relics of the Indigenous Taíno lifestyle there. It is said that many Spaniards escaped the English invasion of 1655 through secret passages in the caves with the help of Indigenous people and African slaves, in exchange for the slaves' freedom.

== Overview ==
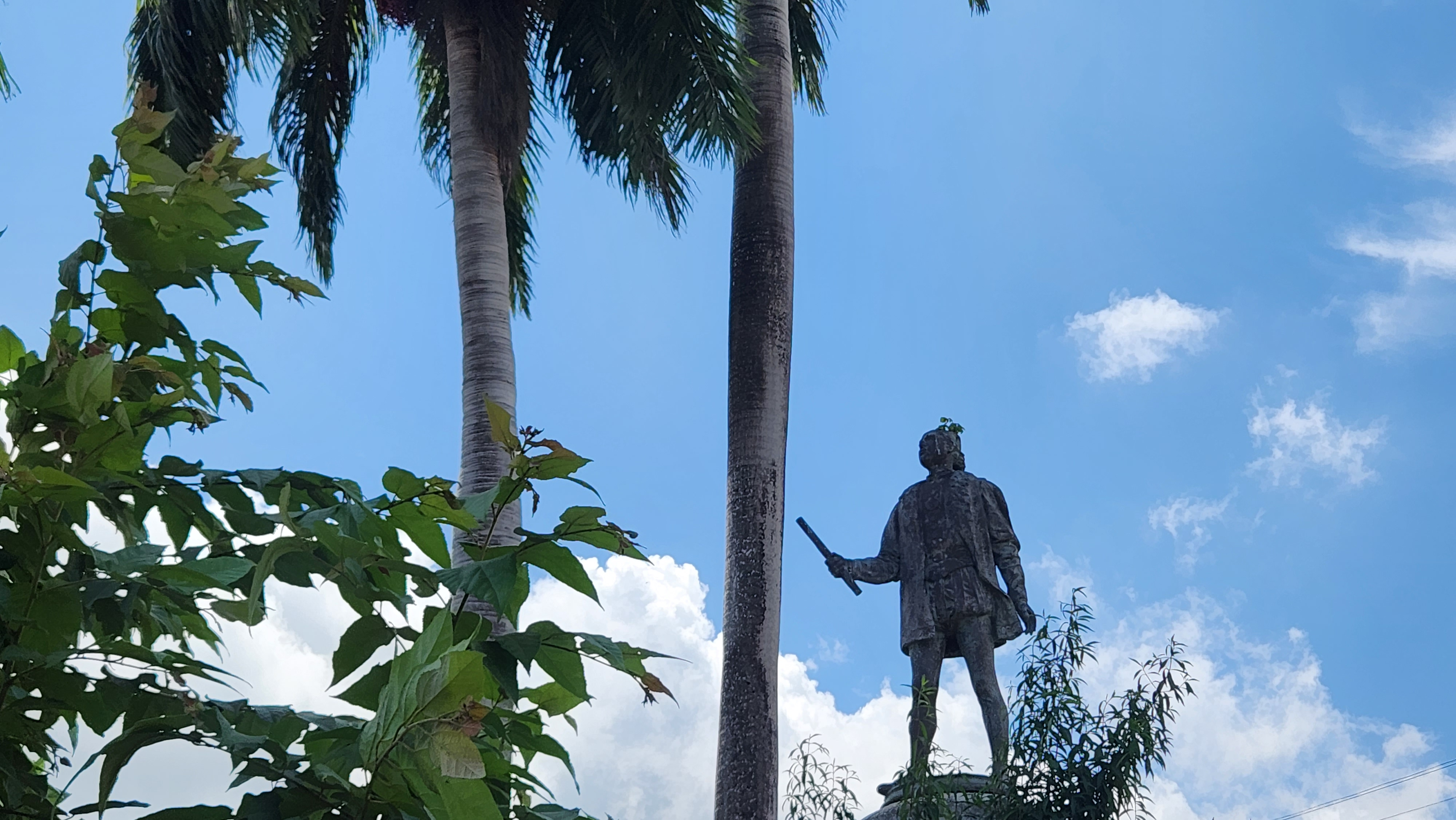
Columbus St. Ann's Bay 20231003 115152

The city of Discovery Bay sits on a bay of the same name. The bay was originally named Puerto Seco (Dry Harbour) by Christopher Columbus because, unlike the neighboring Rio Bueno bay, there are no permanent rivers flowing into it. However, groundwater does enter the bay through deep cracks in the basement limestone, especially on the geologic fault line that runs through the ship channel and on the western side. The salinities of the submerged springs are greater than 20 parts per thousand, yet they cause a marked difference in temperature and salinity in the shallow western back reef.

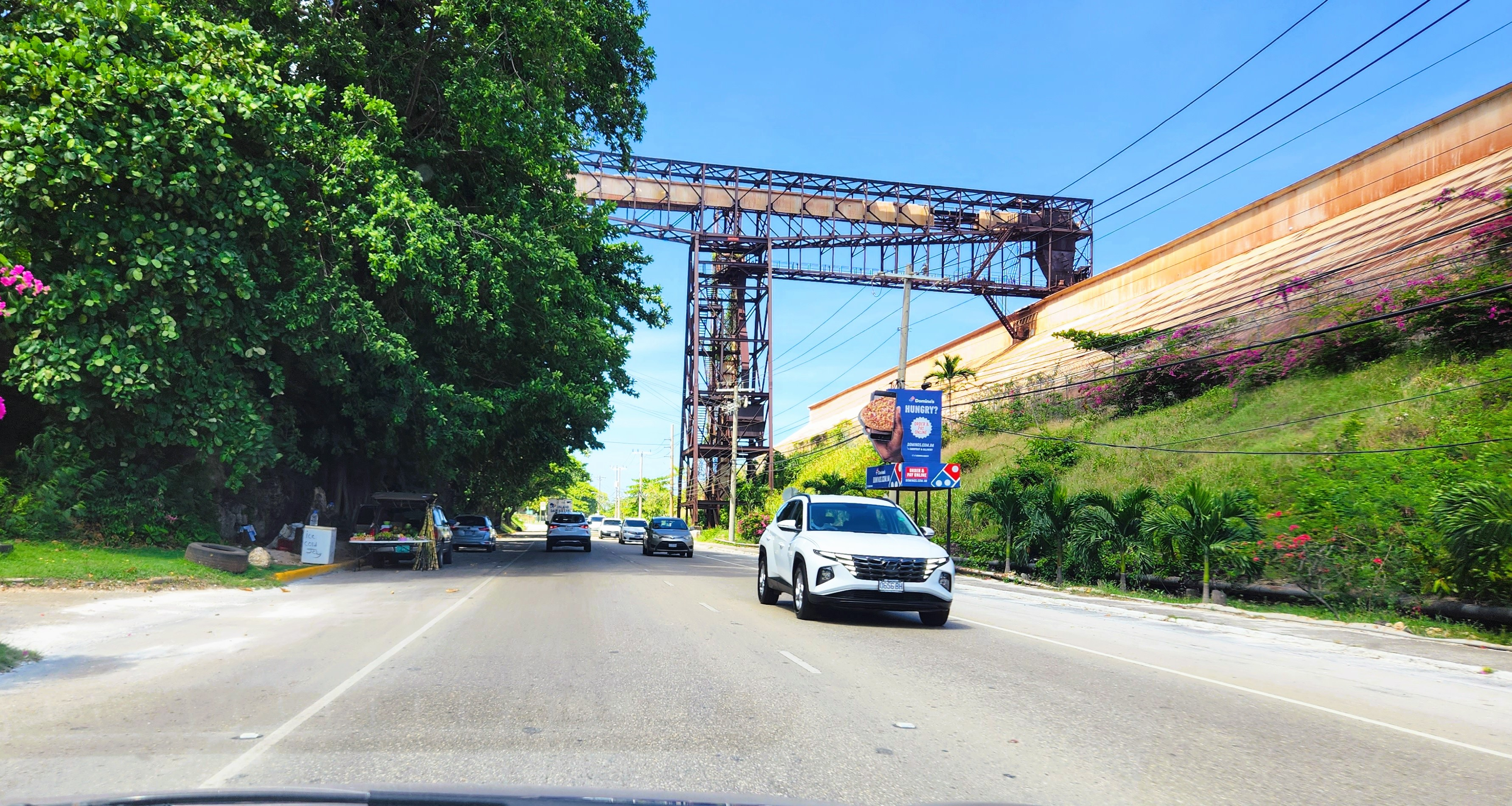
Bauxite Industry in St. Ann Parish

Discovery Bay's economy is dependent upon tourism and bauxite mining. To the west of the bay is a port from which the St. Ann Bauxite Company, which employs 450 people, exports ore. The St. Ann Bauxite company was formerly named Kaiser Jamaica Bauxite Co. (KJBC), and was jointly owned by Kaiser Aluminum and the government of Jamaica.

It is also the site of the Discovery Bay Marine Laboratory, operated by the University of the West Indies. Founded in 1965, the lab has hosted researchers from around the world focusing on coral reef biology and tropical coastal processes.

The majority of the city's 2,700 residents are of African descent. The original Taíno Arawak residents did not survive the Spanish conquest in the 16th century.

== See also ==
- Dry Harbour (1812 ship) was a French vessel taken in prize . An American privateer captured her in 1814, but she was recaptured. She was condemned in 1814.
- Dry Harbour Planters was launched in 1816 and was wrecked on 21 November 1820.
