= Port Esquivel, Jamaica =

Settlement in Jamaica

Coordinates: 17.894°N 77.133°W

Location of Port Esquivel in Jamaica

Port Esquivel is a settlement in the south coast of Jamaica that primarily handles aluminium oxide (alumina).

== History ==
The original Puerta de Esquivela was a harbour completed in 1959 and named after the first deputy governor of Jamaica, Juan de Esquivel. Port Esquivel as a loading port was established in the 1950s by Alumina Jamaica Limited. Alumina shipments from the port started in early 1952, when the country's alumina industry was still in its infancy. Port activities were halted during Hurricane Ivan in September 2004.

== Operations ==
Located 22 miles (35 km) west of Kingston, Port Esquivel is primarily an alumina-handling facility but is also the only port on Jamaica's south coast capable of accommodating large ships. Its 645 feet (197 m) pier is made of concrete and steel and some 35,000 tonnes (34,000 long tons; 39,000 short tons) of goods can be loaded and processed in 38 hours. Two vessels can berth at the port concurrently.

A 14 miles (23 km)-long channel allows for the export of alumina and molasses and for the import of fuel oil and other alumina-related products like bauxite. Texaco supplies oil to the Jamaica Public Service (JPS) via its oil storage plant on Port Esquivel. Port Esquivel has its own fire brigade.

== Environmental impact ==
According to a 1987 environmental study, alumina pollution at Port Esquivel was negatively affecting the growth of the coastal sea grass; in 1984 alone, close to 5 acres (2.0 ha) of seagrass beds were destroyed. Oil pollution from leakages at the Texaco storage facility similarly damaged the nearby corals.
