= Cave Hill, Saint Michael, Barbados =

Location in Barbados

Coordinates: 13.134013°N 59.630088°W

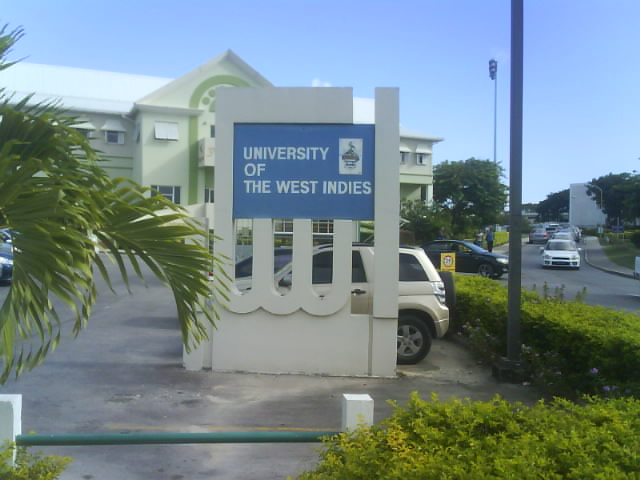
Sign of the Cave Hill campus of the University of the West Indies.

Cave Hill, St. Michael, is a suburban area situated in the parish of Saint Michael, Barbados. It is located about 4 km north-west of the capital city Bridgetown, along the west coast of Barbados.

The University of the West Indies at Cave Hill, one of the general campuses of the University of the West Indies (UWI) system, is located here.

== University of the West Indies at Cave Hill ==
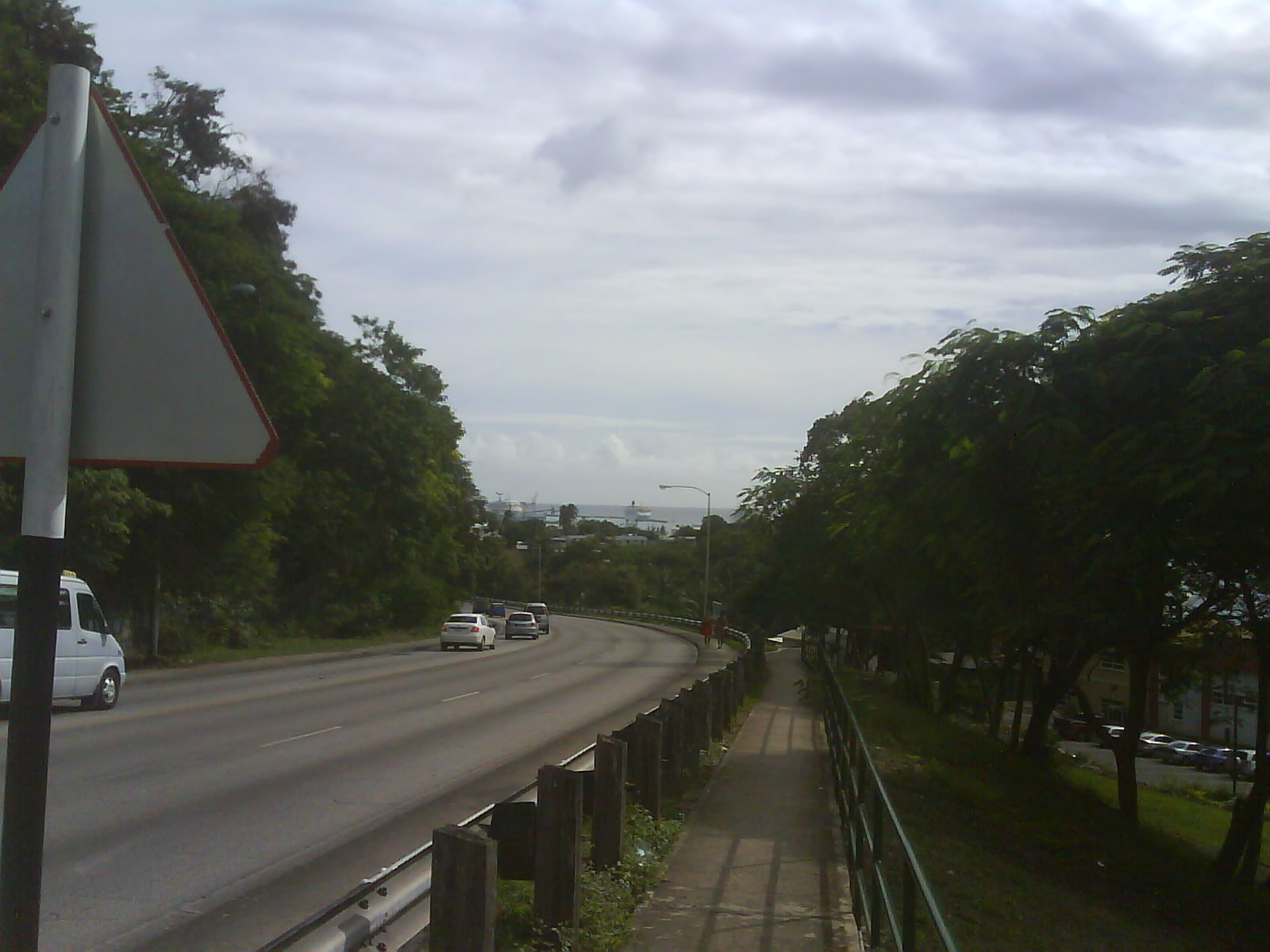
University Drive, westbound with port in distance

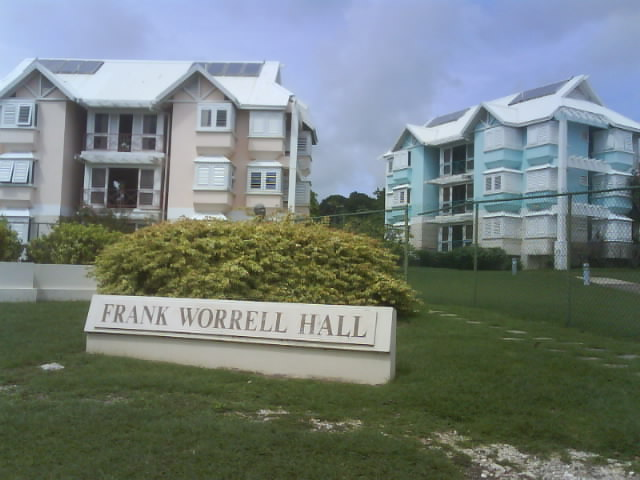
Dormitories at the Cave Hill campus of the University of the West Indies

The Cave Hill Campus overlooks the island’s capital, Bridgetown, five miles away. Despite its expansion in recent years, the campus maintains much of its original architecture of simple, low-rise buildings. The scenic attractiveness and relatively small size of the university community creates an inviting, intimate and friendly atmosphere. Since 2004, the Cave Hill campus is the site of the West Indies Federal Archives Centre.
