= Robert Samuels (cricketer) =

West Indian cricketer (born 1971)

Personal information
- Full name: Robert George Samuels
- Born: 13 March 1971 (age 55); Kingston, Jamaica
- Batting: Left-handed
- Role: Opening batsman
- Relatives: Marlon Samuels (brother)

International information
- National side: West Indies (1996-1997)
- Test debut (cap 211): 19 April 1996 v New Zealand
- Last Test: 1 February 1997 v Australia
- ODI debut (cap 79): 6 December 1996 v Australia
- Last ODI: 18 January 1997 v Pakistan

Career statistics
Competition	Test	ODI	FC	LA
Matches	6	8	106	77
Runs scored	372	54	5,529	1,396
Batting average	37.20	18.00	31.77	24.06
100s/50s	1/1	0/0	6/34	1/7
Top score	125	36*	159	103
Catches/stumpings	8/–	1/–	87/–	24/–
- Source: CricInfo, 19 January 2024

Robert George Samuels (born 13 March 1971) is a former Jamaican cricketer and coach. He played, from 1996 to 1997, in six Test matches and eight One Day Internationals for the West Indies cricket team. He was born at Kingston, Jamaica in 1971.

Samuels has since coached Jamaica at both the U-19 and senior levels.

He also served as an assistant coach and later an interim coach of the West Indies women's cricket team. In 2022 Samuels coached the Trinbago Knight Riders Women's side to the inaugural Women's Caribbean Premier League title.

== Career ==
An opening batsman, Samuels scored 125 in his second Test against New Zealand in 1996. On the tour of Australia later that year, he managed 231 runs at an average of 33 across four Tests. In the final Test at Perth, he contributed 76 in a match-winning 208 run partnership with Brian Lara (132). Despite an unbeaten 35 in the second innings, it would be his final Test for the West Indies.

The high point of his brief ODI career was an unbeaten 36 off 24 balls which helped West Indies to a four-wicket win over Australia in Perth. Coming in at 179 for five, Samuels added 86 for the sixth wicket with Lara (90) to pull of an unlikely victory.

== Personal life ==
He attended Kingston College in Kingston, Jamaica. He is the older brother of Marlon Samuels, also a former West Indian cricketer.
