= 2011–12 Regional Four Day Competition =

Cricket tournament

- Administrator: West Indies Cricket Board
- Cricket format: First-class cricket (4 days)
- Champions: Jamaica (12th title)
- Participants: 7
- Matches: 24
- Most runs: 582 – Narsingh Deonarine (Guyana)
- Most wickets: 49 – Nikita Miller (Jamaica)

The 2011–12 Regional Four Day Competition was the 46th domestic first-class cricket tournament held in the West Indies, it took place from 5 February 2011 – 16 April 2012. Unlike the previous year when the touring England Lions took part in the series, this edition was played between the seven teams based in the Caribbean. The tournament retained the same structure as the previous season; a round–robin that was followed by semi–finals where the top four teams competed.

Jamaica won the tournament for the 12th time and for the fifth time in succession. It is the first time that a team has won five outright titles in a row, previously Barbados had won four in a row plus a shared title from 1975/76 to 1979/80. Jamaica sealed their victory by beating Barbados by 139 runs in the final at Sabina Park; this was preceded by a semi–final win over Guyana and six wins from six games in the initial league stage, which saw them finish top of the table.

== Points table ==
| Team | Pld | W | L | T | D | Aban | Pts |
|---|---|---|---|---|---|---|---|
| Jamaica | 6 | 6 | 0 | 0 | 0 | 0 | 72 |
| Barbados | 6 | 4 | 2 | 0 | 0 | 0 | 48 |
| Trinidad and Tobago | 6 | 3 | 2 | 0 | 1 | 0 | 46 |
| Guyana | 6 | 3 | 2 | 0 | 1 | 0 | 39 |
| Windward Islands | 6 | 2 | 4 | 0 | 0 | 0 | 28 |
| (Cricket West Indies) Combined Campuses and Colleges | 6 | 1 | 5 | 0 | 0 | 0 | 16 |
| Leeward Islands | 6 | 1 | 5 | 0 | 0 | 0 | 12 |
Source:Cricinfo

== Round-Robin ==
3–5 February 2012
Scorecard

| Guyana | v | (Cricket West Indies) Leeward Islands |
| 208 (80 overs); Leon Johnson 52 (142); Gavin Tonge 5/53 (20 overs) | | 98 (39.4 overs); Kieran Powell 37 (80); Devendra Bishoo 4/39 (11.4 overs) |
| 226 (81.4 overs); Assad Fudadin 52 (188); Nelson Bolan 4/43 (10.4 overs) | | 102 (30.4 overs); Tonito Willett 21 (28); Devendra Bishoo 4/31 (9.4 overs) |

Guyana won by 234 runs
Windsor Park, Roseau, Dominica
Umpires: Lennox Abraham (Dominica) and Peter Nero (Trinidad)

- Leeward Islands won the toss and elected to field.
- Points: Guyana 12, Leeward Islands 0
- Nelson Bolan (Leeward Islands) made his first-class debut.

3–5 February 2012
Scorecard

| Jamaica | v | (Cricket West Indies) Windward Islands |
| 180 (74.4 overs); Brendan Nash 49* (161); Garey Mathurin 5/34 (20.4 overs) | | 159 (50.3 overs); Garey Mathurin 25; Andrew Richardson 5/36 (11.3 overs) |
| 298 (63.5 overs); Chris Gayle 165 (155); Shane Shillingford 6/75 (20.5 overs) | | 238 (84.1 overs); Devon Smith 103 (245); Andre Russell 3/16 (7.1 overs) |

Jamaica won by 81 runs
Sabina Park, Kingston, Jamaica
Umpires: Nigel Duguid (Guyana) and Norman Malcolm (Jamaica)

- Windward Islands won the toss and elected to field.
- Points: Jamaica 12, Windward Islands 0

3–5 February 2012
Scorecard

| Trinidad and Tobago | v | (Cricket West Indies) Combined Campuses and Colleges |
| 229 (72.4 overs); Kieron Pollard 60 (70); Ryan Austin 7/84 (25.4 overs) | | 111 (54.3 overs); Yannick Ottley 32; Sunil Narine 5/22 (16 overs) |
| 168 (51 overs); Denesh Ramdin 40 (83); Jason Holder 5/48 (16 overs) | | 114 (44.1 overs); Jason Holder 27 (45); Sunil Narine 8/17 (14.1 overs) |

Trinidad and Tobago won by 172 runs
3Ws Oval, Bridgetown, Barbados
Umpires: Gregory Brathwaite (Barbados) and Goaland Greaves (Saint Vincent)
Player of the match: Sunil Narine (Trinidad and Tobago)

- Trinidad and Tobago won the toss and elected to bat.
- Points: Trinidad and Tobago 12, Combined Campuses and Colleges 0
- Yannick Ottley (CCC) made his first-class debut.

10–11 February 2012
Scorecard

| Leeward Islands (Cricket West Indies) | v | (Cricket West Indies) Combined Campuses and Colleges |
| 39 (22.2 overs); Tonito Willett 20 (37); Ryan Austin 5/19 (5.2 overs) | | 167 (63 overs); Nkrumah Bonner 43; Anthony Martin 4/32 (20 overs) |
| 113 (32.5 overs); Justin Athanaze 35 (26); Ryan Austin 5/52 (10.5 overs) |

Combined Campuses and Colleges won by an innings and 15 runs
3Ws Oval, Bridgetown, Barbados
Umpires: Michael Gough (England) and Luther Kelly (Saint Kitts)
Player of the match: Ryan Austin (Combined Campuses and Colleges)

- Combined Campuses and Colleges won the toss and elected to field.
- Points: Combined Campuses and Colleges 12, Leeward Islands 0

10–13 February 2012
Scorecard

| Guyana | v | (Cricket West Indies) Windward Islands |
| 138 (29.2 overs); Veerasammy Permaul 36; Nelon Pascal 5/50 (11 overs) | | 252 (57.3 overs); Delorn Johnson 51; Veerasammy Permaul 6/91 (20 overs) |
| 294 (79 overs); Narsingh Deonarine 84; Liam Sebastien 4/55 (14 overs) | | 183/5 (51.1 overs); Johnson Charles 66; Christopher Barnwell 1/19 (2 overs) |

Windward Islands won by 5 wickets
Windsor Park, Roseau, Dominica
Umpires: Lennox Abraham (Dominica) and Peter Nero (Trinidad)
Player of the match: Nelon Pascal (Windward Islands)

- Guyana won the toss and elected to bat.
- Points: Windward Islands 12, Guyana 0

10–12 February 2012
Scorecard

| Jamaica | v | Barbados |
| 287 (84.4 overs); Donovan Pagon 55 (131); Tino Best 3/24 (12 overs) | | 157 (57.3 overs); Omar Phillips 67 (150); Nikita Miller 5/25 (22 overs) |
| 162 (58.2 overs); Tamar Lambert 61 (79); Kemar Roach 5/31 (19 overs) | | 172 (51.5 overs); Jonathan Carter 64 (73); Nikita Miller 5/24 (17.5 overs) |

Jamaica won by 120 runs
Sabina Park, Kingston, Jamaica
Umpires: Nigel Duguid (Guyana) and Vivian Johnson (Jamaica)
Player of the match: Nikita Miller (Jamaica)

- Jamaica won the toss and elected to bat.
- Points: Jamaica 12, Barbados 0

16–19 February 2012
Scorecard

| Trinidad and Tobago | v | Barbados |
| 338 (96.5 overs); Denesh Ramdin 88; Fidel Edwards 5/64 (19.5 overs) | | 279 (80.3 overs); Kirk Edwards 70; Sunil Narine 5/78 (32 overs) |
| 119 (39 overs); Denesh Ramdin 37; Tino Best 3/31 (8 overs) | | 180/5 (53.5 overs); Kraigg Brathwaite 48*; Sunil Narine 3/54 (19.5 overs) |

Barbados won by 5 wickets
Kensington Oval, Bridgetown, Barbados
Umpires: Gregory Brathwaite (Barbados) and Vivian Johnson (Jamaica)
Player of the match: Kirk Edwards (Barbados)

- Barbados won the toss and elected to field.
- Points: Barbados 12, Trinidad and Tobago 4

16–19 February 2012
Scorecard

| Combined Campuses and Colleges (Cricket West Indies) | v | Guyana |
| 194 (62.3 overs); Nkrumah Bonner 57 (140); Veerasammy Permaul 5/63 (22.3 overs) | | 320 (95 overs); Assad Fudadin 102* (184); Kevin McClean 4/55 (23 overs) |
| 342 (118.4 overs); Chadwick Walton 119* (213); Christopher Barnwell 6/78 (27 overs) | | 219/6 (50.5 overs); Leon Johnson 54 (92); Kevin McClean 4/53 (12.5 overs) |

Guyana won by 4 wickets
Warner Park, Basseterre, Saint Kitts
Umpires: Nigel Duguid (Guyana) and Michael Gough (England)
Player of the match: Assad Fudadin (Guyana)

- Combined Campuses and Colleges won the toss and elected to bat.
- Points: Guyana 12, Combined Campuses and Colleges 0

16–18 February 2012
Scorecard

| Jamaica | v | (Cricket West Indies) Leeward Islands |
| 404/8d (152 overs); Donovan Pagon 155 (329); Justin Athanaze 3/102 (37 overs) | | 104 (38.1 overs); Devon Thomas 38 (62); Odean Brown 5/6 (9.1 overs) |
| | | 99(f/o) (45.4 overs); Kieran Powell 55 (124); Nikita Miller 5/16 (14.4 overs) |

Jamaica won by an innings and 201 runs
Sabina Park, Kingston, Jamaica
Umpires: Norman Malcolm (Jamaica) and Joel Wilson (Trinidad)
Player of the match: Donovan Pagon (Jamaica)

- Jamaica won the toss and elected to bat.
- Points: Jamaica 12, Leeward Islands 0
- Jason Campbell (Leeward Islands) made his first-class debut.

24–27 February 2012
Scorecard

| Trinidad and Tobago | v | (Cricket West Indies) Windward Islands |
| 364/9d (124 overs); Denesh Ramdin 151*; Shane Shillingford 3/82 (36 overs) | | 203 (66.1 overs); Keddy Lesporis 84; Sunil Narine 5/49 (28.1 overs) |
| 98/6 (20.3 overs); Justin Guillen 41; Liam Sebastien 3/25 (5.3 overs) | | 258(f/o) (62.1 overs); Darren Sammy 88; Sunil Narine 5/78 (28 overs) |

Trinidad and Tobago won by 4 wickets
Queen's Park Oval, Port of Spain, Trinidad
Umpires: Michael Gough (England) and Joel Wilson (Trinidad)
Player of the match: Denesh Ramdin (Trinidad and Tobago)

- Trinidad and Tobago won the toss and elected to bat.
- Points: Trinidad and Tobago 12, Windward Islands 0
- Emile Rajah (Windward Islands) made his first-class debut.

24–26 February 2012
Scorecard

| Barbados | v | (Cricket West Indies) Combined Campuses and Colleges |
| 237 (82.3 overs); Jonathan Carter 47 (99); Kevin McClean 3/30 (13.3 overs) | | 145 (50.2 overs); Floyd Reifer 40 (97); Tino Best 4/33 (12.2 overs) |
| 238/4d (79 overs); Omar Phillips 87 (167); Jason Dawes 2/42 (13 overs) | | 141 (43.3 overs); Nkrumah Bonner 49 (74); Kemar Roach 4/35 (12 overs) |

Barbados won by 189 runs
Kensington Oval, Bridgetown, Barbados
Umpires: Vincent Bullen (Barbados) and Peter Nero (Trinidad)
Player of the match: Kemar Roach (Barbados)

- Barbados won the toss and elected to bat.
- Points: Barbados 12, Combined Campuses and Colleges 0

24–27 February 2012
Scorecard

| Guyana | v | Jamaica |
| 294 (118 overs); Narsingh Deonarine 89; Odean Brown 6/100 (34 overs) | | 454/9d (155.4 overs); Brendan Nash 205* (378); Devendra Bishoo 5/115 (45.4 overs) |
| 187 (74.5 overs); Assad Fudadin 47; David Bernard 3/32 (9 overs) | | 30/2 (9.4 overs); Brenton Parchment and Brendan Nash 10; Devendra Bishoo 1/5 (3 overs) |

Jamaica won by 8 wickets
Sir Vivian Richards Stadium, North Sound, Antigua
Umpires: Nigel Duguid (Guyana) and Clancy Mack (Antigua)
Player of the match: Brendan Nash (Jamaica)

- Guyana won the toss and elected to bat.
- Points: Jamaica 12, Guyana 0

9–12 March 2012
Scorecard

| Barbados | v | Guyana |
| 317 (116.1 overs); Kraigg Brathwaite 62 (156); Brandon Bess 3/45 (14 overs) | | 441 (147 overs); Shivnarine Chanderpaul 125* (232); Chris Jordan 5/77 (31 overs) |
| 58 (28 overs); Chris Jordan 15* (35); Narsingh Deonarine 7/26 (12 overs) |

Guyana won by an innings and 66 runs
Kensington Oval, Bridgetown, Barbados
Umpires: Anisur Rahman (Bangladesh) and Vincent Bullen (Barbados)
Player of the match: Narsingh Deonarine (Guyana)

- Guyana won the toss and elected to field.
- Points: Guyana 12, Barbados 0
- Miguel Cummins (Barbados) made his first-class debut.

9–12 February 2012
Scorecard

| Jamaica | v | Trinidad and Tobago |
| 290 (88.2 overs); Carlton Baugh 140; Kavesh Kantasingh 6/94 (31 overs) | | 143 (69 overs); Aneil Kanhai 28; Nikita Miller 4/40 (31 overs) |
| 157 (59.3 overs); Donovan Pagon 51; Aneil Kanhai 4/17 (10 overs) | | 112 (50.3 overs); Justin Guillen 40; David Bernard 7/23 (10.3 overs) |

Jamaica won by 192 runs
Queen's Park Oval, Port of Spain, Trinidad
Umpires: Goaland Greaves (Saint Vincent) and Peter Nero (Trinidad)
Player of the match: Carlton Baugh (Trinidad)

- Jamaica won the toss and elected to bat.
- Points: Jamaica 12, Trinidad and Tobago 0
- Marlon Barclay and Kevon Cooper (Trinidad and Tobago) made their first-class debuts.

9–11 March 2012
Scorecard

| Leeward Islands (Cricket West Indies) | v | (Cricket West Indies) Windward Islands |
| 121 (48.5 overs); Javier Liburd 50 (68); Keon Peters 5/43 (18 overs) | | 178 (61.3 overs); Liam Sebastien 77 (151); Gavin Tonge 6/78 (21 overs) |
| 177 (58 overs); Javier Liburd 37 (45); Garey Mathurin 3/22 (18 overs) | | 90 (35.5 overs); Keddy Lesporis 32 (36); Tonito Willett 4/34 (10 overs) |

Leeward Islands won by 30 runs
Beausejour Stadium, Gros Islet, Saint Lucia
Umpires: Lennox Abraham (Dominica) and Clancy Mack (Antigua)
Player of the match: Gavin Tonge (Leeward Islands)

- Leeward Islands won the toss and elected to bat.
- Points: Leeward Islands 12, Windward Islands 4
- Hayden Walsh (Leeward Islands) and Kavem Hodge (Windward Islands) made their first-class debuts.

16–18 March 2012
Scorecard

| Leeward Islands (Cricket West Indies) | v | Barbados |
| 138 (47.3 overs); Lionel Baker 33 (41); Sulieman Benn 4/17 (10 overs) | | 317 (98.2 overs); Shane Dowrich 95* (189); Gavin Tonge 3/35 (13.2 overs) |
| 172 (53.1 overs); Austin Richards 51 (69); Sulieman Benn 5/53 (17 overs) |

Barbados won by an innings and 7 runs
Kensington Oval, Bridgetown, Barbados
Umpires: Vincent Bullen (Barbados) and Norman Malcolm (Jamaica)
Player of the match: Sulieman Benn (Barbados)

- Barbados won the toss and elected to field.
- Points: Barbados 12, Leeward Islands 0
- Jomel Warrican (Barbados) made his first-class debut.

16–19 March 2012
Scorecard

| Guyana | v | Trinidad and Tobago |
| 290 (102.4 overs); Narsingh Deonarine 87 (183); Shannon Gabriel 3/64 (26 overs) | | 349 (137.4 overs); Adrian Barath 114 (286); Narsingh Deonarine 6/71 (43.4 overs) |
| 208/5 (79 overs); Assad Fudadin 108 (212); Shannon Gabriel 3/56 (18 overs) |

Match drawn
Queen's Park Oval, Port of Spain, Trinidad
Umpires: Anisur Rahman (Bangladesh) and Vivian Johnson (Jamaica)
Player of the match: Adrian Barath (Trinidad and Tobago)

- Trinidad and Tobago won the toss and elected to field.
- Points: Trinidad and Tobago 6, Guyana 3
- Chanderpaul Hemraj (Guyana) made his first-class debut.

16–18 March 2012
Scorecard

| Windward Islands (Cricket West Indies) | v | (Cricket West Indies) Combined Campuses and Colleges |
| 149 (44.1 overs); Lindon James 52 (63); Ryan Austin 3/31 (13.1 overs) | | 209 (76.1 overs); Jason Holder 41 (87); Garey Mathurin 4/23 (13.1 overs) |
| 191 (62.4 overs); Andre Fletcher 87 (164); Jason Holder 3/36 (14 overs) | | 109 (54.3 overs); Floyd Reifer 31* (78); Shane Shillingford 7/34 (27 overs) |

Windward Islands won by 22 runs
National Cricket Stadium, St. George's, Grenada
Umpires: Lennox Abraham (Dominica) and Clancy Mack (Antigua)
Player of the match: Shane Shillingford (Windward Islands)

- Combined Campuses and Colleges won the toss and elected to field.
- Points: Windward Islands 12, Combined Campuses and Colleges 4

23–26 March 2012
Scorecard

| Jamaica | v | (Cricket West Indies) Combined Campuses and Colleges |
| 200 (71.1 overs); David Bernard 40; Jason Holder 3/27 (13 overs) | | 137 (54.4 overs); Shacaya Thomas 78 (158); Nikita Miller 3/28 (15.4 overs) |
| 257 (71.1 overs); Tamar Lambert 55 (114); Ryan Austin 5/89 (25 overs) | | 166 (56.1 overs); Shacaya Thomas 41 (97); Odean Brown 5/25 (11.1 overs) |

Jamaica won by 154 runs
3Ws Oval, Bridgetown, Barbados
Umpires: Lennox Abraham (Dominica) and Anisur Rahman (Bangladesh)
Player of the match: Odean Brown (Jamaica)

- Jamaica won the toss and elected to bat.
- Points: Jamaica 12, Combined Campuses and Colleges 0

23–24 March 2012
Scorecard

| Leeward Islands (Cricket West Indies) | v | Trinidad and Tobago |
| 81 (29.3 overs); Austin Richards 31 (50); Kavesh Kantasingh 4/17 (9.3 overs) | | 172 (64.1 overs); Marlon Barclay 39 (104); Hayden Walsh 4/47 (13 overs) |
| 158 (39.5 overs); Austin Richards 44 (67); Kavesh Kantasingh 6/77 (15.5 overs) | | 68/1 (9.5 overs); Justin Guillen 47 (38); Gavin Tonge 1/21 (3 overs) |

Trinidad and Tobago won by 9 wickets
Warner Park, Basseterre, Saint Kitts
Umpires: Vincent Bullen (Barbados) and Luther Kelly (Saint Kitts)
Player of the match: Kavesh Kantasingh (Trinidad and Tobago)

- Leeward Islands won the toss and elected to bat.
- Points: Trinidad and Tobago 12, Leeward Islands 0
- Teshwan Castro and Evin Lewis (Trinidad and Tobago) made their first–class debuts.

23–24 March 2012
Scorecard

| Barbados | v | (Cricket West Indies) Windward Islands |
| 192 (64 overs); Kirk Edwards 99 (174); Shane Shillingford 6/77 (24 overs) | | 133 (44.1 overs); Sergio Fedee 31*; Javon Searles 6/44 (14 overs) |
| 85 (39.4 overs); Omar Phillips and Carlos Brathwaite 16; Shane Shillingford 8/33 (19.4 overs) | | 73 (17 overs); Nelon Pascal 20; Javon Searles 5/39 (8 overs) |

Barbados won by 71 runs
National Cricket Stadium, St. George's, Grenada
Umpires: Goaland Greaves (Saint Vincent) and Clancy Mack (Antigua)
Player of the match: Javon Searles (Barbados)

- Barbados won the toss and elected to bat.
- Points: Barbados 12, Windward Islands 0

== Semi finals ==
30 March – 1 April
Scorecard

| Jamaica | v | Guyana |
| 196 (79.2 overs); Donovan Pagon 53 (98); Veerasammy Permaul 3/35 (26 overs) | | 126 (61.4 overs); Shivnarine Chanderpaul 47* (132); Nikita Miller 3/16 (5.4 overs) |
| 189 (64.3 overs); Xavier Marshall 59; Devendra Bishoo 5/62 (22.3 overs) | | 126 (52 overs); Assad Fudadin 24 (92); Nikita Miller 4/28 (21 overs) |

Jamaica won by 133 runs
Sabina Park, Kingston, Jamaica
Umpires: Luther Kelly and Clancy Mack

- Jamaica won the toss and elected to bat
- Player of the match: Nikita Miller (Jamaica)

30 March – 1 April
Scorecard

| Barbados | v | Trinidad and Tobago |
| 223 (95.3 overs); Jonathan Carter 47 (55); Kavesh Kantasingh 4/52 (37.3 overs) | | 84 (33.5 overs); Adrian Barath 21 (53); Sulieman Benn 5/28 (16.5 overs) |
| 216 (69 overs); Jonathan Carter 52 (68); Shannon Gabriel 5/78 (15 overs) | | 128 (49.5 overs); Marlon Barclay 33 (63); Sulieman Benn 4/35 (15.5 overs) |

Barbados won by 227 runs
Queen's Park Oval, Port of Spain
Umpires: Lennox Abraham and Goaland Greaves

- Barbados won the toss and elected to bat.
- Player of the match: Kraigg Brathwaite (Barbados)

== Final ==
13–16 April
Scorecard

| Jamaica | v | Barbados |
| 273 (93.1 overs); Donovan Pagon 71 (109); Sulieman Benn 5/90 (29 overs) | | 291 (101.2 overs); Jonathan Carter 99 (179); Andrew Richardson 5/71 (19 overs) |
| 247/5 dec (49 overs); Donovan Pagon 45 (63); Sulieman Benn 4/67 (14 overs) | | 90 (26.3 overs); Shane Dowrich 32 (56); David Bernard 4/34 (8 overs) |

Jamaica won by 139 runs
Sabina Park, Kingston, Jamaica
Umpires: Nigel Duguid and Peter Nero

- Jamaica won the toss and elected to bat
- Player of the match: Sulieman Benn (Barbados)

== Points allocation ==
Completed match

- Outright win – 12
- Loser if 1st Innings lead obtained – 4
- Loser if tie on 1st Innings – 3
- Loser if 1st Innings also lost – 0
- Tie – 8

Incomplete Match

- 1st Innings lead – 6
- 1st Innings loss – 3
- Tie on 1st innings – 4

Score Equal in a Drawn Match

- Team batting on the 4th innings – 8
- Team fielding on the 4th innings if that team has lead on 1st innings – 6
- If scores tied on 1st innings – 4
- If team has lost on 1st innings – 3

Abandoned Match

In the event of a match being abandoned without any play having taken place, or in the event of there being no 1st innings decision, three points each.
