= 2012–13 Regional Super50 =

Cricket tournament

- Administrator: West Indies Cricket Board
- Cricket format: List A
- Tournament format(s): Group stage and knockout
- Participants: 7
- Matches: 24

The 2012–13 Regional Super50 is the domestic one-day cricket competition in the West Indies. This edition of the Regional Super50 tournament will feature the six permanent first-class regions of the West Indies along with the Combined Campuses and Colleges team. The tournament will consist of a round-robin group stage followed by two semi-final matches for the top four finishers with the winners advancing to the final.

In the tournament final, played at Kensington Oval, Windward Islands defeated Combined Campuses and Colleges by nine wickets (D/L method) to win their first championship since the 2000-2001 season.

== Table ==
| Team | Pld | W | L | T | N/R | NRR | Pts |
|---|---|---|---|---|---|---|---|
| Jamaica | 6 | 6 | 0 | 0 | 0 | +0.774 | 25 |
| Trinidad and Tobago | 6 | 5 | 1 | 0 | 0 | +0.770 | 23 |
| (Cricket West Indies) Windward Islands | 6 | 3 | 3 | 0 | 0 | –0.419 | 12 |
| (Cricket West Indies) Combined Campuses and Colleges | 6 | 2 | 4 | 0 | 0 | –0.055 | 10 |
| Barbados | 6 | 2 | 4 | 0 | 0 | -0.013 | 10 |
| Guyana | 6 | 2 | 4 | 0 | 0 | −0.349 | 8 |
| (Cricket West Indies) Leeward Islands | 6 | 1 | 5 | 0 | 0 | −0.650 | 4 |
Source:Cricinfo

== Group stage ==
7 February 2013
14:00 (D/N)
Scorecard

| Jamaica; 239/8 (50 overs) | v | Barbados; 164 (44.5 overs) |
| Nkrumah Bonner 110 (139); Kevin Stoute 2/31 (8 overs) | | Jonathan Carter 28; Tamar Lambert 3/22 (10 overs) |

Jamaica won by 75 runs
Kensington Oval, Bridgetown, Barbados
Umpires: Peter Nero (Trinidad) and Leslie Reifer (Barbados)

- Jamaica won the toss and elected to bat
- Points: Jamaica 5, Barbados 0
- Kyle Hope (Barbados), Sheldon Cotterrell and Andre McCarthy (Jamaica) made their List A debuts

7 February 2013
14:00 (D/N)
Scorecard

| Leeward Islands (Cricket West Indies); 162 (43.2 overs) | v | Guyana; 164/5 (44.1 overs) |
| Jahmar Hamilton 40; Christopher Barnwell 4/31 (7.2 overs) | | Leon Johnson 30; Justin Athanaze 2/24 (10 overs) |

Guyana won by 5 wickets
Sir Vivian Richards Stadium, North Sound, Antigua
Umpires: Danesh Ramdhanie (Trinidad) and Joel Wilson (Trinidad)
Player of the match: Christopher Barnwell (Guyana)

- Leewards Islands won the toss and elected to bat
- Points: Guyana 4, Leeward Islands 0
- Ronsford Beaton (Guyana), Quinton Boatswain and Rahkeem Cornwall (Leeward Islands) made their List A debuts

7 February 2013
14:00 (D/N)
Scorecard

| Combined Campuses and Colleges (Cricket West Indies); 207 (43.2 overs) | v | (Cricket West Indies) Windward Islands; 211/9 (46.4 overs) |
| Raymon Reifer 60* (86); Shane Shillingford 4/39 (8.2 overs) | | Andre Fletcher 67 (97); Akeem Dawar 3/23 (10 overs) |

Windward Islands won by 1 wicket
Beausejour Stadium, Gros Islet, Saint Lucia
Umpires: Zahid Bassarath (Trinidad) and Nigel Duguid (Guyana)

- Windward Islands won the toss and elected to field
- Points: Windward Islands 4, Combined Campuses and Colleges 0
- Derone Davis and Raymon Reifer (Combined Campuses and Colleges) made their List A debuts

20 February 2013
14:00 (D/N)
Scorecard

| Guyana; 111 (40.3 overs) | v | Barbados; 114/5 (26.1 overs) |
| Leon Johnson 28 (26); Ashley Nurse 4/22 (8.3 overs) | | Jonathan Carter 38* (62); Paul Wintz 3/40 (6 overs) |

Barbados won by 5 wickets
Kensington Oval, Bridgetown, Barbados
Umpires: Jonathan Blades (Barbados) and Nick Cook (England)
Player of the match: Ashley Nurse (Barbados)

- Barbados won the toss and elected to field
- Points: Barbados 5, Guyana 0

21 February 2013
09:30
Scorecard

| Trinidad and Tobago; 216/5 (50 overs) | v | (Cricket West Indies) Windward Islands; 202 (49.2 overs) |
| Jason Mohammed 63*; Shane Shillingford 2/15 (10 overs) | | Andre Fletcher 58; Yannic Cariah 5/44 (10 overs) |

Trinidad and Tobago won by 14 runs
Arnos Vale Stadium, Kingstown, Saint Vincent
Umpires: Lennox Abraham (Dominica) and Nandkumar Shivsankar (Guyana)
Player of the match: Yannic Cariah (Trinidad and Tobago)

- Trinidad and Tobago won the toss and elected to bat
- Points: Trinidad and Tobago 4, Windward Islands 0
- Nicolas Poorin (Trinidad and Tobago) and Tyrone Theophile (Windward Islands) made their List A debuts

21 February 2013
09:30
Scorecard

| Combined Campuses and Colleges (Cricket West Indies); 157 (48 overs) | v | Jamaica; 158/6 (45.2 overs) |
| Floyd Reifer 32; Nikita Miller 3/27 (10 overs) | | Andre McCarthy 45; Raymon Reifer 2/25 (8 overs) |

Jamaica won by 4 wickets
Sabina Park, Kingston, Jamaica
Umpires: Nigel Duguid (Guyana) and Patrick Gustard (Jamaica)
Player of the match: Tamar Lambert (Jamaica)

- Combined Campuses and Colleges won the toss and elected to bat
- Points: Jamaica 4, Combined Campuses and Colleges 0

24 February 2013
09:30
Scoreboard

| Leeward Islands (Cricket West Indies); 238/7 (50 overs) | v | Trinidad and Tobago; 239/7 (48.3 overs) |
| Devon Thomas 69 (86); Samuel Badree 3/23 (10 overs) | | Justin Guillen 72 (63); Anthony Martin 3/24 (10 overs) |

Trinidad and Tobago won by 3 wickets
Warner Park, Basseterre, Saint Kitts
Umpires: Norman Malcolm (Jamaica) and Leslie Reifer (Barbados)
Player of the match: Justin Guillen (Trinidad and Tobago)

- Trinidad & Tobago won the toss and elected to field
- Points: Trinidad & Tobago 4, Leeward Islands 0

24 February 2013
09:30
Scoreboard

| Guyana; 198/8 (50 overs) | v | (Cricket West Indies) Windward Islands; 199/3 (46.5 overs) |
| Trevon Griffith 55; Dalton Polius 2/16 (6 overs) | | Devon Smith 110; Steven Jacobs 1/24 (10 overs) |

Windward Islands won by 7 wickets
Arnos Vale Stadium, Kingstown, Saint Vincent
Umpires: Lennox Abraham (Dominica) and Nick Cook (England)
Player of the match: Devon Smith (Windward Islands)

- Windward Islands won the toss and elected to field
- Points: Windward Islands 4, Guyana 0
- Rajiv Ivan (Guyana) made his List A debut

24 February 2013
14:00 (D/N)
Scoreboard

| Combined Campuses and Colleges (Cricket West Indies); 167 (49.2 overs) | v | Barbados; 94 (25.3 overs) |
| Raymon Reifer 33; Chris Jordan 3/27 (10 overs) | | Chris Jordan 25; Raymon Reifer 5/19 (8 overs) |

Combined Campuses and Colleges won by 59 runs
3Ws Oval, Bridgetown, Barbados
Umpires: Nandkumar Shivsankar (Guyana) and Verdayne Smith (Jamaica)
Player of the match: Raymon Reifer (Combined Campuses and Colleges)

- Combined Campuses and Colleges won the toss and elected to bat
- Points: Combined Campuses and Colleges 5, Barbados 0
- Chaim Holder (Combined Campuses and Colleges) made his List A debut

11 March 2013
09:30
Scorecard

| Jamaica; 229/9 (50 overs) | v | (Cricket West Indies) Windward Islands; 151 (38.4 overs) |
| Danza Hyatt 59 (116); Nelon Pascal 3/57 (10 overs) | | Liam Sebastien 37 (63); Odean Brown 3/19 (7 overs) |

Jamaica won by 78 runs
National Cricket Stadium, St. George's, Grenada
Umpires: Danesh Ramdhanie (Trinidad) and Verdayne Smith (Jamaica)

- Windward Islands won the toss and elected to field.
- Points: Jamaica 5, Windward Islands 0

11 March 2013
14:00 (D/N)
Scorecard

| Leeward Islands (Cricket West Indies); 115 (40.2 overs) | v | (Cricket West Indies) Combined Campuses and Colleges; 118/7 (32.2 overs) |
| Devon Thomas (31); Derone Davis 3/32 (10 overs) | | Shacaya Thomas 61; Justin Athanaze 3/20 (7.2 overs) |

Combined Campuses and Colleges won by 3 wickets
3Ws Oval, Bridgetown, Barbados
Umpires: Jonathan Blades (Barbados) and Nandkumar Shivsankar (Guyana)
Player of the match: Shacaya Thomas (Combined Campuses and Colleges)

- Leeward Islands won the toss and elected to bat.
- Points: Combined Campuses and Colleges 5, Leeward Islands 0
- Lyndel Richardson (Leeward Islands) made his List A debut.

11 March 2013
14:00 (D/N)
Scorecard

| Guyana; 234 (50 overs) | v | Trinidad and Tobago; 235/8 (45 overs) |
| Christopher Barnwell 66 (100); Kevon Cooper 3/33 (10 overs) | | Adrian Barath 65 (80); Steven Jacobs 3/39 (9 overs) |

Trinidad and Tobago won by 2 wickets
Queen's Park Oval, Port of Spain, Trinidad
Umpires: Patrick Gustard (Jamaica) and Norman Malcolm (Jamaica)

- Trinidad and Tobago won the toss and elected to field.
- Points: Trinidad and Tobago 4, Guyana 0

21 March 2013
09:30
Scorecard

| Combined Campuses and Colleges (Cricket West Indies); 97 (37.5 overs) | v | Trinidad and Tobago; 98/2 (21.4 overs) |
| Kevin McClean 26 (49); Kevon Cooper 5/17 (10 overs) | | Adrian Barath 40* (69); Raymon Reifer 1/25 (6 overs) |

Trinidad and Tobago won by 8 wickets
Queen's Park Oval, Port of Spain, Trinidad
Umpires: Gregory Brathwaite (Barbados) and Patrick Gustard (Jamaica)
Player of the match: Kevon Cooper (Trinidad and Tobago)

- Trinidad and Tobago won the toss and elected to field.
- Points: Trinidad and Tobago 5, Combined Campuses and Colleges 0
- Kesrick Williams (Combined Campuses and Colleges) made his List A debut.

21 March 2013
09:30
Scorecard

| Jamaica; 253/4 (50 overs) | v | (Cricket West Indies) Leeward Islands; 196 (44.4 overs) |
| Danza Hyatt 99; Kelbert Walters 1/46 (10 overs) | | Sylvester Joseph 83; Andrew Richardson 3/23 (7.4 overs) |

Jamaica won by 57 runs
Sabina Park, Kingston, Jamaica
Umpires: Danesh Ramdhanie (Trinidad) and Chris Taylor
Player of the match: Danza Hyatt (Jamaica)

- Leeward Islands won the toss and elected to field.
- Points: Jamaica 5, Leeward Islands 0
- Akeem Saunders (Leeward Islands) made his List A debut.

21 March 2013
14:00 (D/N)
Scorecard

| Barbados; 279/7 (50 overs) | v | (Cricket West Indies) Windward Islands; 180 (47 overs) |
| Kirk Edwards 64 (93); Nelon Pascal 3/87 (10 overs) | | Andre Fletcher 42 (44); Jonathan Carter 5/26 (10 overs) |

Barbados won by 99 runs
Kensington Oval, Bridgetown, Barbados
Umpires: Jonathan Blades (Barbados) and Nigel Duguid (Guyana)
Player of the match: Jonathan Carter (Barbados)

- Barbados won the toss and elected to bat.
- Points: Barbados 5, Windward Islands 0

4 April 2013
09:30
Scorecard

| Barbados; 164 (46.4 overs) | v | (Cricket West Indies) Leeward Islands; 126/5 (33 overs) |
| Kyle Mayers 37 (57); Tonito Willett 6/19 (10 overs) | | Devon Thomas 36 (49); Tino Best 2/28 (6 overs) |

Leeward Islands won by 22 runs (D/L)
Warner Park, Basseterre, Saint Kitts
Umpires: Masudur Rahman (Bangladesh) and Joel Wilson (Trinidad)
Player of the match: Kraigg Brathwaite (Barbados)

- Barbados won the toss and elected to bat.
- Rain reduced Leeward Islands' innings to 33 overs.
- Points: Leeward Islands 4, Barbados 0
- Shane Burton (Leeward Islands) made his List A debut.

4 April 2013
09:30
Scorecard

| Jamaica; 225 (45.2 overs) | v | Trinidad and Tobago; 229/7 (49.4 overs) |
| Andre McCarthy 88 (107); Shannon Gabriel 4/34 (9.2 overs) | | Lendl Simmons 87 (121); Nkrumah Bonner 3/48 (9 overs) |

Trinidad and Tobago won by 3 wickets
Sabina Park, Kingston, Jamaica
Umpires: Gregory Brathwaite (Barbados) and Patrick Gustard (Jamaica)
Player of the match: Yannick Ottley (Trinidad and Tobago)

- Trinidad and Tobago won the toss and elected to field.
- Points: Trinidad and Tobago 4, Jamaica 0

4 April 2013
14:00 (D/N)
Scorecard

| Combined Campuses and Colleges (Cricket West Indies); 175 (48.3 overs) | v | Guyana; 178/7 (48 overs) |
| Anthony Alleyne 58 (96); Paul Wintz 2/28 (6 overs) | | Narsingh Deonarine 51; Ryan Austin 2/31 (10 overs) |

Guyana won by 3 wickets
3Ws Oval, Bridgetown, Barbados
Umpires: Nigel Duguid (Guyana) and Peter Nero (Trinidad)
Player of the match: Narsingh Deonarine (Guyana)

- Combined Campuses and Colleges won the toss and elected to bat.
- Points: Guyana 4, Combined Campuses and Colleges 0
- Anthony Alleyne (Combined Campuses and Colleges) made his List A debut.

7 April 2013
14:00 (D/N)

| Jamaica | v | Guyana |

Sabina Park, Kingston, Jamaica

7 April 2013
14:00 (D/N)

| Leeward Islands (Cricket West Indies) | v | (Cricket West Indies) Windward Islands |

Sir Vivian Richards Stadium, North Sound, Antigua

7 April 2013
14:00 (D/N)

| Trinidad and Tobago | v | Barbados |

Queen's Park Oval, Port of Spain, Trinidad

== Semi finals ==
18 April 2013
14:00 (D/N)

| Combined Campuses and Colleges; 232 for 7 | v | Trinidad & Tobago; 92 |
| Alleyne 99; Ottley 3-37 | | Williams 3-16 |

Combined Campuses and Colleges beat Trinidad & Tobago by 140 runs
Kensington Oval, Bridgetown, Barbados

19 April 2013
14:00 (D/N)

| Jamaica; 242 for 8 | v | Windward Islands; 244 for 5 |
| Parchment 86, Bonner 74; Peters 3-60 | | Fletcher 68, Lesporis 61, Smith 59) |

Windwards Islands beat Jamaica by five wickets
Kensington Oval, Bridgetown, Barbados

== Final ==
21 April 2013
14:00 (D/N)

| Combined Campuses and Colleges; 174 | v | Windward Islands; 134 for 1 |
| Kyle Corbin 46, Nekoli Parris 34; Peters 4-32, Shillingford 3-29 | | Smith 67* |

Windward Islands beat Combined Campuses and Colleges by 9 wickets (D/L method)
Kensington Oval, Bridgetown, Barbados
