= 2011–12 Caribbean Twenty20 =

- Administrator: WICB
- Cricket format: Twenty20
- Tournament format(s): Round-robin and knockout
- Host: West Indies
- Champions: Trinidad and Tobago (2nd title)
- Participants: 10
- Matches: 24
- Player of the series: Kieron Pollard
- Most runs: Johnson Charles (207)
- Most wickets: Krishmar Santokie (14)
- Official website: ct20.windiescricket.com

The 2011–12 Caribbean Twenty20 was the third season of the Caribbean Twenty20, a domestic T20 tournament administered by the West Indies Cricket Board. The opening match was held on 9 January 2012, and the final was played at Kensington Oval, Barbados on 22 January 2012. The national teams of Canada and Netherlands in addition to Sussex participated as the overseas teams. There were ten teams as it was in the 2010–11 tournament.

Trinidad and Tobago won the tournament and, as the best performing domestic team, qualified for the 2012 Champions League Twenty20 (qualifying stage).

== Venues ==
Queen's Park Oval in Trinidad and Tobago was initially a venue for some of the preliminary matches, but eventually was cancelled due to nonavailability of the ground on 4 January. All matches were played at the following two grounds:

North Sound, Antigua	Bridgetown, Barbados
Sir Vivian Richards Stadium	Kensington Oval
Capacity: 10,000	Capacity: 15,000
2011–12 Caribbean Twenty20 is located in the Caribbean

== Format ==
The format was the same as it was in 2010–11. The tournament consisted of 24 matches, divided into a group stage and a knockout stage. The group stage had the teams divided into two equal groups, with each playing a round-robin tournament. The top two teams of each group advanced to the knockout stage. The knockout stage consisted of two semi-finals, a third-place playoff and the grand final. The semi-finals had the top team of one group facing the second from the other. The winners of the semi-finals played the grand final to determine the winner of the competition, while the losers of the semi-finals played the third-place playoff.

Points in the group stage were awarded as follows:

Points
Results	Points
Win	4 points
No result	2 points
Loss	0 points

== Teams ==
The following ten teams participated in the tournament:

Group A

- Canada^{†}
- Guyana
- (Cricket West Indies) Leeward Islands
- Trinidad and Tobago
- (Cricket West Indies) Windward Islands

Group B

- Barbados
- (Cricket West Indies) Combined Campuses and Colleges
- Jamaica
- Netherlands^{†}
- (England) Sussex^{†}

^{†}Invited overseas team

== Results ==
=== Group stage ===
==== Group A ====
Pos	Team	Pld	W	L	NR	Pts	NRR
1	(Cricket West Indies) Windward Islands	4	4	0	0	16	0.817
2	Trinidad and Tobago	4	3	1	0	12	2.578
3	Guyana	4	2	2	0	8	0.106
4	(Cricket West Indies) Leeward Islands	4	1	3	0	4	−2.024
5	Canada	4	0	4	0	0	−1.553

9 January (D/N)
Scorecard

Windward Islands (Cricket West Indies); 129/4 (20 overs)	v	Trinidad and Tobago; 118/9 (20 overs)

Windward Islands won by 11 runs
Sir Vivian Richards Stadium, North Sound, Antigua

9 January (D/N)
Scorecard

Leeward Islands (Cricket West Indies); 134/6 (20 overs)	v	Guyana; 139/5 (19.2 overs)

Guyana won by 5 wickets
Sir Vivian Richards Stadium, North Sound, Antigua

11 January (D/N)
Scorecard

Canada; 111/7 (20 overs)	v	(Cricket West Indies) Windward Islands; 114/1 (16.3 overs)

Windwards won by 9 wickets
Sir Vivian Richards Stadium, North Sound, Antigua

11 January (D/N)
Scorecard

Trinidad and Tobago; 211/3 (20 overs)	v	(Cricket West Indies) Leeward Islands; 44 (12.5 overs)

Trinidad and Tobago won by 167 runs
Sir Vivian Richards Stadium, North Sound, Antigua

13 January (D/N)
Scorecard

Canada; 108 (19.3 overs)	v	(Cricket West Indies) Leeward Islands; 109/2 (13.4 overs)

Leeward Islands won by 8 wickets
Sir Vivian Richards Stadium, North Sound, Antigua

13 January (D/N)
Scorecard

Guyana; 101/9 (20 overs)	v	Trinidad and Tobago; 104/3 (17.1 overs)

Trinidad and Tobago won by 7 wickets
Sir Vivian Richards Stadium, North Sound, Antigua

17 January (D/N)
Scorecard

Canada; 143/7 (20 overs)	v	Guyana; 144/2 (17 overs)

Guyana won by 8 wickets
Kensington Oval, Bridgetown, Barbados

17 January (D/N)
Scorecard

Windward Islands (Cricket West Indies); 157 (19.5 overs)	v	(Cricket West Indies) Leeward Islands; 135 (19.2 overs)

Windward Islands won by 22 runs
Kensington Oval, Bridgetown, Barbados

19 January (D/N)
Scorecard

Canada; 99/9 (20 overs)	v	Trinidad and Tobago; 91/2 (15.1 overs)

Trinidad and Tobago won by 8 wickets (D/L)
Kensington Oval, Bridgetown, Barbados

19 January (D/N)
Scorecard

Guyana; 140/8 (20 overs)	v	(Cricket West Indies) Windward Islands; 119/5 (16 overs)

Windward Islands won by 5 wickets (D/L)
Kensington Oval, Bridgetown, Barbados

==== Group B ====
Pos	Team	Pld	W	L	NR	Pts	NRR
1	Barbados	4	4	0	0	16	3.582
2	Jamaica	4	3	1	0	12	0.157
3	(Cricket West Indies) Combined Campuses and Colleges	4	1	3	0	4	−0.947
4	(England) Sussex	4	1	3	0	4	−0.988
5	Netherlands	4	1	3	0	4	−1.487

10 January (D/N)
Scorecard

Sussex (England); 125/9 (20 overs)	v	Netherlands; 106/8 (20 overs)

Sussex won by 34 runs
Sir Vivian Richards Stadium, North Sound, Antigua

10 January (D/N)
Scorecard

Combined Campuses and Colleges (Cricket West Indies); 131/9 (20 overs)	v	Jamaica; 133/8 (19.3 overs)

Jamaica won by 2 wickets
Sir Vivian Richards Stadium, North Sound, Antigua

12 January (D/N)
Scorecard

Jamaica; 152/5 (20 overs)	v	(England) Sussex; 102 (19.2 overs)

Jamaica won by 50 runs
Sir Vivian Richards Stadium, North Sound, Antigua

12 January (D/N)
Scorecard

Netherlands; 73 (20 overs)	v	Barbados; 76/0 (7.3 overs)

Barbados won by 10 wickets
Sir Vivian Richards Stadium, North Sound, Antigua

14 January (D/N)
Scorecard

Combined Campuses and Colleges (Cricket West Indies); 130/5 (20 overs)	v	(England) Sussex; 101/9 (20 overs)

Combined Campuses and Colleges won by 29 runs
Sir Vivian Richards Stadium, North Sound, Antigua

14 January (D/N)
Scorecard

Barbados; 157/7 (20 overs)	v	Jamaica; 95 (16.5 overs)

Barbados won by 62 runs
Sir Vivian Richards Stadium, North Sound, Antigua

18 January (D/N)
Scorecard

Netherlands; 160/3 (20 overs)	v	(Cricket West Indies) Combined Campuses and Colleges; 134/7 (20 overs)

Netherlands won by 26 runs
Kensington Oval, Bridgetown, Barbados

18 January (D/N)
Scorecard

Sussex (England); 89 (18 overs)	v	Barbados; 90/2 (14.4 overs)

Barbados won by 8 wickets
Kensington Oval, Bridgetown, Barbados

20 January (D/N)
Scorecard

Netherlands; 116 (19.4 overs)	v	Jamaica; 118/2 (17.2 overs)

Jamaica won by 8 wickets
Kensington Oval, Bridgetown, Barbados

20 January (D/N)
Scorecard

Combined Campuses and Colleges (Cricket West Indies); 76 (20 overs)	v	Barbados; 81/1 (10 overs)

Barbados won by 9 wickets
Kensington Oval, Bridgetown, Barbados

=== Knockout stage ===
Semifinals
A1	(Cricket West Indies) Windward Islands	98/8 (20 ov)
B2	Jamaica	99/5 (18 ov)
B1	Barbados	90 (19.5 ov)
A2	Trinidad and Tobago	93/5 (14 ov)

Finals
B2	Jamaica	105/5 (20 ov)
A2	Trinidad and Tobago	168/6 (20 ov)
Third place
A1	(Cricket West Indies) Windward Islands	105/3 (17.5 ov)
B1	Barbados	101 (20 ov)

== Fixtures ==
All times shown are in Eastern Caribbean Time (UTC−04).

=== Group stage ===
==== Group A ====
9 January
16:00 (D/N)
Scorecard

Windward Islands (Cricket West Indies); 129/4 (20 overs)	v	Trinidad and Tobago; 118/9 (20 overs)
Darren Sammy 41* (31); Samuel Badree 2/17 (4 overs)		Darren Bravo 51 (42); Shane Shillingford 3/21 (4 overs)

Windward Islands won by 11 runs
Sir Vivian Richards Stadium, North Sound, Antigua
Umpires: Gregory Brathwaite and Clancy Mack
Player of the match: Darren Sammy (WI)

- Windward Islands won the toss and elected to bat.

9 January
20:00 (D/N)
Scorecard

Leeward Islands (Cricket West Indies); 134/6 (20 overs)	v	Guyana; 139/5 (19.2 overs)
Justin Athanaze 30* (15); Steven Jacobs 2/18 (4 overs)		Leon Johnson 37* (32); Gavin Tonge 1/11 (4 overs)

Guyana won by 5 wickets
Sir Vivian Richards Stadium, North Sound, Antigua
Umpires: Vincent Bullen and Peter Nero
Player of the match: Leon Johnson (Guy)

- Leewards won the toss and elected to bat.

11 January
16:00 (D/N)
Scorecard

Canada; 111/7 (20 overs)	v	(Cricket West Indies) Windward Islands; 114/1 (16.3 overs)
Ruvindu Gunasekera 38 (31); Liam Sebastien 1/17 (4 overs)		Johnson Charles 61* (58); Henry Osinde 1/13 (3 overs)

Windwards won by 9 wickets
Sir Vivian Richards Stadium, North Sound, Antigua
Umpires: Vincent Bullen and Peter Nero
Player of the match: Johnson Charles (WI)

- Canada won the toss and elected to bat.

11 January
20:00 (D/N)
Scorecard

Trinidad and Tobago; 211/3 (20 overs)	v	(Cricket West Indies) Leeward Islands; 44 (12.5 overs)
Kieron Pollard 56* (15); Chesney Hughes 1/20 (2 overs)		Chesney Hughes 16 (25); Sunil Narine 4/8 (2 overs)

Trinidad and Tobago won by 167 runs
Sir Vivian Richards Stadium, North Sound, Antigua
Umpires: Gregory Brathwaite and Nigel Duguid
Player of the match: Kieron Pollard (T&T)

- Trinidad and Tobago won the toss and elected to bat.

13 January
16:00 (D/N)
Scorecard

Canada; 108 (19.3 overs)	v	(Cricket West Indies) Leeward Islands; 109/2 (13.4 overs)
Raza-ur-Rehman 30 (31); Gavin Tonge 3/23 (4 overs)		Kieran Powell 47* (42); Rizwan Cheema 1/15 (3 overs)

Leeward Islands won by 8 wickets
Sir Vivian Richards Stadium, North Sound, Antigua
Umpires: Nigel Duguid and Joel Wilson
Player of the match: Gavin Tonge (LI)

- Canada won the toss and elected to bat

13 January
20:00 (D/N)
Scorecard

Guyana; 101/9 (20 overs)	v	Trinidad and Tobago; 104/3 (17.1 overs)
Trevon Griffith 31 (28); Kevon Cooper 3/26 (4 overs)		Lendl Simmons 30 (17); Royston Crandon 1/15 (4 overs)

Trinidad and Tobago won by 7 wickets
Sir Vivian Richards Stadium, North Sound, Antigua
Umpires: Gregory Brathwaite and Vincent Bullen
Player of the match: Kevon Cooper (T&T)

- Trinidad and Tobago won the toss and elected to field

17 January
16:00 (D/N)
Scorecard

Canada; 143/7 (20 overs)	v	Guyana; 144/2 (17 overs)
Jimmy Hansra 40 (36); Devendra Bishoo 2/21 (4 overs)		Narsingh Deonarine 52* (32); Rizwan Cheema 1/21 (3 overs)

Guyana won by 8 wickets
Kensington Oval, Bridgetown, Barbados
Umpires: Gregory Brathwaite and Joel Wilson
Player of the match: Narsingh Deonarine (Guy)

- Canada won the toss and elected to bat

17 January
20:00 (D/N)
Scorecard

Windward Islands (Cricket West Indies); 157 (19.5 overs)	v	(Cricket West Indies) Leeward Islands; 135 (19.2 overs)
Darren Sammy 25 (15); Justin Athanaze 3/12 (4 overs)		Kieran Powell 30 (18); Shane Shillingford 4/22 (4 overs)

Windward Islands won by 22 runs
Kensington Oval, Bridgetown, Barbados
Umpires: Nigel Duguid and Peter Nero
Player of the match: Shane Shillingford (WI)

- Windward Islands won the toss and elected to bat

19 January
16:00 (D/N)
Scorecard

Canada; 99/9 (20 overs)	v	Trinidad and Tobago; 91/2 (15.1 overs)
Hiral Patel 32 (36); Ravi Rampaul 4/26 (4 overs)		Darren Bravo 42* (41); Henry Osinde 1/15 (4 overs)

Trinidad and Tobago won by 8 wickets (D/L)
Kensington Oval, Bridgetown, Barbados
Umpires: Gregory Brathwaite and Clancy Mack
Player of the match: Darren Bravo (T&T)

- Canada won the toss and elected to bat
- Rain interrupted Trinidad & Tobago's innings, reducing it to 18 overs and setting a revised target of 91 runs under the Duckworth–Lewis method.

19 January
20:00 (D/N)
Scorecard

Guyana; 140/8 (20 overs)	v	(Cricket West Indies) Windward Islands; 119/5 (16 overs)
Sewnarine Chattergoon 27 (22); Darren Sammy 3/11 (4 overs)		Johnson Charles 65 (43); Devendra Bishoo 3/15 (4 overs)

Windward Islands won by 5 wickets (D/L)
Kensington Oval, Bridgetown, Barbados
Umpires: Vincent Bullen and Joel Wilson
Player of the match: Darren Sammy (WI)

- Windward Islands won the toss and elected to field
- Rain interrupted Windward Islands' innings, reducing it to 16 overs and setting a revised target of 119 runs under the Duckworth–Lewis method.

==== Group B ====
10 January
16:00 (D/N)
Scorecard

Sussex (England); 125/9 (20 overs)	v	Netherlands; 106/8 (20 overs)
Ben Brown 42 (42); Timm van der Gugten 5/21 (4 overs)		Peter Borren 45 (40); Naved Arif 3/12 (3.3 overs)

Sussex won by 34 runs
Sir Vivian Richards Stadium, North Sound, Antigua
Umpires: Nigel Duguid and Joel Wilson
Player of the match: Timm van der Gugten (Ned)

- Sussex won the toss an elected to bat.

10 January
20:00 (D/N)
Scorecard

Combined Campuses and Colleges (Cricket West Indies); 131/9 (20 overs)	v	Jamaica; 133/8 (19.3 overs)
Chadwick Walton 66 (59); Krishmar Santokie 4/17 (4 overs)		Marlon Samuels 66* (52); Yannick Ottley 3/20 (4 overs)

Jamaica won by 2 wickets
Sir Vivian Richards Stadium, North Sound, Antigua
Umpires: Clancy Mack and Peter Nero
Player of the match: Marlon Samuels (Jam)

- Combined Campuses and Colleges won the toss and elected bat.

12 January
16:00 (D/N)
Scorecard

Jamaica; 152/5 (20 overs)	v	(England) Sussex; 102 (19.2 overs)
Nkruma Bonner 66* (57); Joe Gatting 1/12 (1 overs)		Christopher Nash 26 (28); Odean Brown 3/17 (4 overs)

Jamaica won by 50 runs
Sir Vivian Richards Stadium, North Sound, Antigua
Umpires: Vincent Bullen and Joel Wilson
Player of the match: Nkruma Bonner (Jam)

- Jamaica won the toss and elected to bat.

12 January
20:00 (D/N)
Scorecard

Netherlands; 73 (20 overs)	v	Barbados; 76/0 (7.3 overs)
Michael Swart 16 (16); Ashley Nurse 3/7 (4 overs)		Dwayne Smith 49* (27)

Barbados won by 10 wickets
Sir Vivian Richards Stadium, North Sound, Antigua
Umpires: Nigel Duguid and Clancy Mack
Player of the match: Ashley Nurse (Bar)

- Netherlands won the toss and elected to bat.

14 January
16:00 (D/N)
Scorecard

Combined Campuses and Colleges (Cricket West Indies); 130/5 (20 overs)	v	(England) Sussex; 101/9 (20 overs)
Romel Currency 48 (48); Chris Liddle 2/17 (4 overs)		Joe Gatting 37 (32); Romel Currency 4/8 (4 overs)

Combined Campuses and Colleges won by 29 runs
Sir Vivian Richards Stadium, North Sound, Antigua
Umpires: Gregory Brathwaite and Clancy Mack
Player of the match: Romel Currency (CCC)

- Combined Campuses and Colleges won the toss and elected to bat

14 January
20:00 (D/N)
Scorecard

Barbados; 157/7 (20 overs)	v	Jamaica; 95 (16.5 overs)
Dwayne Smith 86 (57); Krishmar Santokie 2/27 (4 overs)		Nkruma Bonner 27 (31); Tino Best 2/17 (4 overs)

Barbados won by 62 runs
Sir Vivian Richards Stadium, North Sound, Antigua
Umpires: Peter Nero and Joel Wilson
Player of the match: Dwayne Smith (Bar)

- Barbados won the toss and elected to bat

18 January
16:00 (D/N)
Scorecard

Netherlands; 160/3 (20 overs)	v	(Cricket West Indies) Combined Campuses and Colleges; 134/7 (20 overs)
Michael Swart 57 (43); Kyle Mayers 1/22 (4 overs)		Kyle Mayers 23 (28); Pieter Seelaar 2/27 (4 overs)

Netherlands won by 26 runs
Kensington Oval, Bridgetown, Barbados
Umpires: Vincent Bullen and Clancy Mack
Player of the match: Michael Swart (Ned)

- Netherlands won the toss and elected to bat

18 January
20:00 (D/N)
Scorecard

Sussex (England); 89 (18 overs)	v	Barbados; 90/2 (14.4 overs)
Michael Yardy 33 (34); Tino Best 3/11 (3 overs)		Kevin Stoute 37* (48); Will Beer 1/10 (4 overs)

Barbados won by 8 wickets
Kensington Oval, Bridgetown, Barbados
Umpires: Nigel Duguid and Peter Nero
Player of the match: Tino Best (Bar)

- Sussex won the toss and elected to bat

20 January
16:00 (D/N)
Scorecard

Netherlands; 116 (19.4 overs)	v	Jamaica; 118/2 (17.2 overs)
Eric Szwarczynski 44 (45); Krishmar Santokie 4/13 (3.4 overs)		Nkrumah Bonner 35 (34); Pieter Seelaar 1/14 (4 overs)

Jamaica won by 8 wickets
Kensington Oval, Bridgetown, Barbados
Umpires: Gregory Brathwaite and Peter Nero
Player of the match: Krishmar Santokie (Jam)

- The Netherlands won the toss and elected to bat

20 January
20:00 (D/N)
Scorecard

Combined Campuses and Colleges (Cricket West Indies); 76 (20 overs)	v	Barbados; 81/1 (10 overs)
Floyd Reifer 20 (22); Fidel Edwards 2/19 (4 overs)		Kevin Stoute 36* (29); Jason Dawes 1/28 (2 overs)

Barbados won by 9 wickets
Kensington Oval, Bridgetown, Barbados
Umpires: Nigel Duguid and Joel Wilson
Player of the match: Fidel Edwards (Bar)

- Combined Campuses and Colleges won the toss and elected to bat

=== Knockout stage ===
Semi-finals

21 January
16:00 (D/N)
Scorecard

Windward Islands (Cricket West Indies); 98/8 (20 overs)	v	Jamaica; 99/5 (18 overs)
Lindon James 37* (41); Odean Brown 2/15 (4 overs)		David Bernard Jr. 22 (20); Shane Shillingford 1/15 (4 overs)

Jamaica won by 5 wickets
Kensington Oval, Bridgetown, Barbados
Umpires: Gregory Brathwaite and Joel Wilson
Player of the match: Odean Brown (Jam)

- Windward Islands won the toss and elected to bat

21 January
20:00 (D/N)
Scorecard

Barbados; 90 (19.5 overs)	v	Trinidad and Tobago; 93/5 (14 overs)
Shane Dowrich 22 (31); Dwayne Bravo 3/23 (4 overs)		Kieron Pollard 31* (23); Ryan Hinds 2/11 (2 overs)

Trinidad & Tobago won by 5 wickets
Kensington Oval, Bridgetown, Barbados
Umpires: Nigel Duguid and Clancy Mack
Player of the match: Sunil Narine (T&T)

- Barbados won the toss and elected to bat

Third-place playoff

22 January
16:00 (D/N)
Scorecard

Barbados; 101 (20 overs)	v	(Cricket West Indies) Windward Islands; 105/3 (17.5 overs)
Jonathan Carter 42 (53); Delorn Johnson 5/5 (4 overs)		Andre Fletcher 42 (39); Fidel Edwards 1/15 (4 overs)

Windward Islands won by 7 wickets
Kensington Oval, Bridgetown, Barbados
Umpires: Peter Nero and Joel Wilson
Player of the match: Delorn Johnson (WI)

- Barbados won the toss and elected to bat

Final

22 January
20:00 (D/N)
Scorecard

Trinidad and Tobago; 168/6 (20 overs)	v	Jamaica; 105/5 (20 overs)
Dwayne Bravo 49 (43); Odean Brown 3/22 (4 overs)		Carlton Baugh 39* (23); Samuel Badree 1/14 (4 overs)

Trinidad & Tobago won by 63 runs
Kensington Oval, Bridgetown, Barbados
Umpires: Gregory Brathwaite and Nigel Duguid
Player of the match: Dwayne Bravo (T&T)

- Trinidad & Tobago won the toss and elected to bat
