= 2010–11 Regional Four Day Competition =

Cricket tournament

- Administrator: West Indies Cricket Board
- Cricket format: First-class cricket (4 days)
- Champions: Jamaica (11th title)
- Participants: 8
- Matches: 31
- Most runs: 853 – Marlon Samuels (Jamaica)
- Most wickets: 44 – Ryan Austin (Combined Campuses and Colleges)

The 2010–11 Regional Four Day Competition was the 45th domestic first-class cricket tournament held in the West Indies, it took place from 4 February 2011 – 9 April 2011. In addition to the seven Caribbean teams, the tournament also featured the England Lions. The tournament consisted of a round-robin that was followed by semi-finals where the top four teams competed. Although the Lions finished 3rd in the table, they were ineligible to play in the knock-out phase.

Jamaica won the tournament after beating Combined Campuses and Colleges in the final, it was their 4th tournament win in succession and their 11th overall. Jamaica had advanced to the final after a controversial semi-final against Trinidad and Tobago; although the match was drawn, Jamaica advanced because the previous result in the league between the two teams ended in their favour. The Trinidad and Tobago manager, Omar Khan, claimed that "there is still some misinterpretation concerning the rule pertaining to advancing to the finals....We find it very unfair."

Marlon Samuels of Jamaica finished as the tournament's highest run-scorer, he made 853 runs at an average of 65.61, including three centuries and a highest score of 250 not out. The leading wicket-taker in the competition was Ryan Austin of the Combined Campuses and Colleges, he took 44 wickets at an average of 19.15 with best innings figures of 7/134.

== Points table ==
Team	Pld	W	L	T	D	Aban	Pts
Combined Campuses and Colleges	7	4	1	0	2	0	57
Trinidad and Tobago	7	3	1	0	3	0	52
England Lions	7	2	0	0	5	0	51
Jamaica	7	2	0	0	5	0	51
Windward Islands	7	2	3	0	2	0	41
Barbados	7	1	1	0	5	0	27
Leeward Islands	7	1	5	0	0	1	19
Guyana	7	0	4	0	2	1	16
Source:Cricinfo

== Semi finals ==
1–3 April 2011
Scorecard

Combined Campuses and Colleges	v	Windward Islands
256 (100 overs); Romel Currency 95 (263); Liam Sebastien 5/51 (35 overs)		173 (50.2 overs); Lyndon James 48 (89); Kavesh Kantasingh 5/38 (16.2 overs)
202 (86.4 overs); Romel Currency 70 (207); Dalton Polius 5/50 (21.4 overs)		128 (35.2 overs); Keddy Lesporis 55 (71); Ryan Austin 5/31 (11 overs)

Combined Campuses and Colleges won by 157 runs
3Ws Oval, Bridgetown, Barbados
Umpires: Nigel Duguid and Clancy Mack
Player of the match: Romel Currency (Combined Campuses and Colleges)

- Windward Islands won the toss and elected to field.

1–4 April 2011
Scorecard

Jamaica	v	Trinidad and Tobago
664 (201.4 overs); Brendan Nash 207 (349); Amit Jaggernauth 3/115 (47.4 overs)		448/9 (134 overs); Rayad Emrit 113* (126); Andre Russell 4/89 (22 overs)

Match drawn, Jamaica advance
Sir Frank Worrell Memorial Ground, Saint Augustine, Trinidad
Umpires: Gregory Brathwaite and Goaland Greaves
Player of the match: Brendan Nash (Jamaica)

- Trinidad and Tobago won the toss and elected to field.

== Final ==
8 – 9 April 2011
Scorecard

Combined Campuses and Colleges	v	Jamaica
112 (50.1 overs); Raymon Reifer 42 (95); Andre Russell 3/11 (7 overs)		225 (71.3 overs); Tamar Lambert 41 (101); Ryan Austin 4/81 (29.3 overs)
122 (50.5 overs); Omar Phillips 34 (51); Nikita Miller 4/33 (22.5 overs)		15/2 (6.1 overs); Chadwick Walton 7* Kavesh Kantasingh 1/7 (3 overs)

Jamaica won by 8 wickets
3Ws Oval, Bridgetown, Barbados
Umpires: Nigel Duguid and Goaland Greaves
Player of the match: Odean Brown (Jamaica)

- Combined Campuses and Colleges won the toss and elected to bat.

== Points allocation ==
Completed match

- Outright win – 12
- Loser if 1st Innings lead obtained – 4
- Loser if tie on 1st Innings – 3
- Loser if 1st Innings also lost – 0
- Tie – 8

Incomplete Match

- 1st Innings lead – 6
- 1st Innings loss – 3
- Tie on 1st innings – 4

Score Equal in a Drawn Match

- Team batting on the 4th innings – 8
- Team fielding on the 4th innings if that team has lead on 1st inning – 6
- If scores tied on 1st innings – 4
- If team has lost on 1st innings – 3

Abandoned Match

In the event of a match being abandoned without any play having taken place, or in the event of there being no 1st innings decision, three points each.
