= Kavesh Kantasingh =

West Indian cricketer (born 1986)

Personal information
- Born: 30 September 1986 (age 40); Trinidad
- Batting: Left-handed
- Bowling: Slow left-arm orthodox

Domestic team information
- Years: Team
- 2008–2012: Combined Campuses
- 2012–2016: Trinidad and Tobago
- Source: CricketArchive, 27 December 2015

Kavesh Kantasingh (born 30 September 1986) is a Trinidadian cricketer who has played for Trinidad and Tobago and the Combined Campuses and Colleges in West Indian domestic cricket. He is a left-arm orthodox spin bowler.

Kantasingh made his senior debut in West Indian cricket at the 2007–08 KFC Cup, played for the Combined Campuses. His first-class debut came a few months later, in the 2007–08 Carib Beer Cup. In the 2008–09 Regional Four Day Competition, Kantasingh finished with 32 wickets from 11 matches, behind only Ryan Austin for his team. His maiden first-class five-wicket haul came the following season, when he took 6/29 and 6/55 (match figures of 12/84) against Trinidad and Tobago. A month later, Kantasingh also took 5/69 against the Leeward Islands.

During the 2010–11 season, Kantasingh added a second first-class ten-wicket haul, taking 7/22 and 4/50 against Barbados. He finished the season with 42 wickets at an average of 17.80, which placed him second in the competition, behind his teammate Ryan Austin. In the 2011–12 Regional Super50, Kantasingh took a maiden List A five-wicket haul, 6/26 against the Leeward Islands. For the 2011–12 Regional Four Day Competition, however, he switched to play for his home country, Trinidad and Tobago. In his first match for his new team, against Jamaica, he took 6/94. This was followed two matches by a ten-wicket haul against the Leewards, 4/17 and 6/77.

In October 2019, he was named in the Combined Campuses' squad for the 2019–20 Regional Super50 tournament.
