= Jason Campbell (cricketer) =

West Indian cricketer (born 1985)

Personal information
- Full name: Jason Arneil Campbell
- Born: 30 November 1985 (age 40); Charlestown, Nevis
- Batting: Left-handed
- Bowling: Slow left-arm orthodox

Domestic team information
- Years: Team
- 2011–present: Leeward Islands

Career statistics
Competition	FC	LA	T20
Matches	8	20	1
Runs scored	122	84	–
Batting average	12.20	8.40	–
100s/50s	0/0	0/0	–
Top score	39*	15*	–
Balls bowled	828	879	18
Wickets	9	24	1
Bowling average	57.55	27.54	30.00
5 wickets in innings	0	1	0
10 wickets in match	0	0	0
Best bowling	3/100	5/37	1/30
Catches/stumpings	5/0	4/0	0/0
- Source: , 10 October 2021

Jason Arneil Campbell (born 30 November 1985) is a Nevisian cricketer who has played for the Leeward Islands in West Indian domestic cricket. He is a slow left-arm orthodox bowler.

Campbell made his senior debut for the Leewards during the 2011–12 Regional Super50, against Jamaica. His first-class and Twenty20 debuts both came later in the season, in the Regional Four Day Competition and Caribbean Twenty20, respectively. After the 2011–12 season, Campbell did not again play for the Leewards until January 2015, when he featured in a Regional Super50 fixture against Trinidad and Tobago.
