= West Indian cricket team in Sri Lanka in 2005 =

West Indians in Sri Lanka in 2005
	West Indies	Sri Lanka
- Dates: 9 July 2005 – 9 August 2005
Captains	Shivnarine Chanderpaul	Marvan Atapattu

Test series
- Result: Sri Lanka won the 2-match series 2–0
Most runs	Shivnarine Chanderpaul (154)	Kumar Sangakkara (197)
Most wickets	Jermaine Lawson (11)	Muttiah Muralitharan (17)

One Day International series
- Player of the series: See Indian Oil Cup 2005

The West Indies cricket team toured Sri Lanka for two Test matches and an ODI tri-series in July and August 2005. West Indies were severely depleted owing to a contract dispute, which led to players like Brian Lara, Chris Gayle and Corey Collymore refusing to play. Thus, Sri Lanka went into the series as even more overwhelming favourites, their strong game at home and West Indies' poor form – with only one Test win in the last ten attempts. And they confirmed their favourite status, winning both Tests in rather emphatic style, although their batting showed worrying weaknesses against West Indian bowlers who bowled with more heart than talent at times.

== Match details ==
=== Tour match, Sri Lanka Cricket XI v West Indians, 9–10 July ===
Match drawn

West Indies didn't impress in their first tour match, but still hung on for a draw in this two-day game without first-class status. A mix of young, talented Sri Lankan bowlers and players close to the national side bowled them out for 110, and Marvan Atapattu and Kumar Sangakkara lifted Sri Lanka to 382. However, 32 overs wasn't enough to bowl out the West Indies, who were still thoroughly outplayed.

=== 1st Test, Sri Lanka v West Indies, 13–16 July ===
13–16 July 2005
(5-day match)
Scorecard

West Indies	v	Sri Lanka
285 (88.4 overs); S Chanderpaul 69 (158); SL Malinga 4/71 (14 overs)		227 (57.3 overs); WPUJC Vaas 49 (99); JJC Lawson 4/59 (14.3 overs)
113 (60 overs); S Chanderpaul 48* (158); M Muralitharan 6/36 (21 overs)		172/4 (38.3 overs); TT Samaraweera 51 (67); JJC Lawson 4/43 (12 overs)

Sri Lanka won by 6 wickets
Sinhalese Sports Club Ground, Colombo
Umpires: Nadeem Ghauri (PAK) and SJA Taufel (AUS)
Player of the match: WPUJC Vaas (SL)

- West Indies won the toss and elected to bat.
- The match was scheduled for five days but completed in four.
- WMG Ramyakumara (SL), and XM Marshall, RS Morton, and D Ramdin (all WI) made their Test debuts.

A depleted West Indies put in a surprisingly good effort against a strong home side, and actually attained a first-innings lead at the Sinhalese Sports Club Ground. It was a respectable effort from what was effectively an A side, only Shivnarine Chanderpaul and Daren Powell regular features in the normal Test side. Chanderpaul won the toss and opted to bat, and almost immediately lost Xavier Marshall – who had hit two fours in his 11-ball 10. However, the two 26-year-olds Sylvester Joseph and Runako Morton played responsible knocks against the unpredictable bounce from Lasith Malinga, adding 58 for the second wicket. Even Muttiah Muralitharan was ineffective. However, two wickets in three balls from Malinga just after lunch turned the game the way Sri Lanka wanted, as West Indies were 113 for 5 with captain Chanderpaul and debutant wicket-keeper Denesh Ramdin at the crease.

However, West Indies fought back. Ramdin took care of both spinners and seamers in style, driving his way to 56 before dragging a delivery from Test debutant Gayan Wijekoon onto his own stumps, but he had lifted West Indies to a respectable 192 for 6. Chanderpaul and spinner Omari Banks saw them through to stumps on day one, with an unbeaten partnership of 79. However, the second day opened with a nightmare for West Indies. Malinga and Chaminda Vaas took care of the remaining four wickets in 40 deliveries in the morning, for only fourteen runs, as the tail rolled over for 285.

That wasn't nearly as embarrassing, however, as Sri Lanka's top order collapse. Marvan Atapattu, Sanath Jayasuriya and Mahela Jayawardene – all experienced Test batsmen – rolled over to Daren Powell and Jermaine Lawson, as Sri Lanka first went to 7 for 2 and then 47 for 4. Thilan Samaraweera and Tillakaratne Dilshan staged a small recovery, with 11 and 32 respectively, but when Lawson and Omari Banks got the pair of them out, things were promising for West Indies, with Sri Lanka on the rack at 93 for 6. With Gayan Wijekoon playing an obviously premeditated slash to a ball from Tino Best, which went to the hands of Sylvester Joseph, West Indies were hopeful of getting a first innings lead of 100-odd.

But that was as good as it got. Rangana Herath made 24 in a little over ten overs, before being dismissed by Lawson, Vaas paired up with Muralitharan for a partnership of 66, as both players played one of their most mature innings of their careers – Vaas made 49 and Muralitharan 36, and Sri Lanka salvaged 227 all out, trailing by 58. But the fizz had gone out of the West Indies. In 10.2 overs before bad light stopped play, Vaas took two wickets – both lbw – and Muralitharan one, and West Indies ended the day on 17 for 3.

It wasn't to be much better. Vaas' inswingers on the overcast third day claimed two more wickets lbw, Narsingh Deonarine and Dwayne Smith, and then Muttiah Muralitharan took care of Denesh Ramdin before the umpires judged the light was too poor to play in. West Indies had added 42 runs in 23 overs, and on the fourth day, Muralitharan wrapped up proceedings. Only a 54-run partnership between skipper Chanderpaul (who ended stranded on a not-out 48) and Tino Best saved West Indies from a sub-100 score, but Muralitharan finished with six for 36 – still not as remarkable as Vaas' figures, which read 18 overs, 9 maidens, 15 conceded runs and 4 wickets.

Jermaine Lawson was the lone wicket-taker for West Indies in the second innings, but the target of 172 was always going to be too small, although there was hope with the score on 49 for 3. Mahela Jayawardene with 41 not out and Thilan Samaraweera with 51 steadied the ship with a partnership of 86, and Jayawardene and Dilshan saw Sri Lanka to the predictable six-wicket win – but, in all fairness, West Indies had overperformed.

=== 2nd Test, Sri Lanka v West Indies, 22–25 July ===
22–25 July 2005
(5-day match)
Scorecard

Sri Lanka	v	West Indies
150 (46.1 overs); TT Samaraweera 37 (77); DB Powell 5/25 (13.1 overs)		148 (58.1 overs); N Deonarine 40 (94); WPUJC Vaas 6/22 (15 overs)
375/7d (107 overs); KC Sangakkara 157* (284); JJC Lawson 3/104 (29 overs)		137 (41.2 overs); N Deonarine 29 (45); M Muralitharan 8/46 (16.2 overs)

Sri Lanka won by 240 runs
Asgiriya Stadium, Kandy
Umpires: AL Hill (NZ) and SJA Taufel (AUS)
Player of the match: KC Sangakkara (SL)

- West Indies won the toss and elected to field.
- The match was scheduled for five days but completed in four.
- RR Ramdass (WI) made his Test debut.

The hosts Sri Lanka were yet again stunned by the West Indies' accurate and fierce pace bowling, as they chose to bowl first at Kandy. In the third over, they got immediate reward, having Sanath Jayasuriya caught behind off Daren Powell for 2 – however, TV replays indicated that the decision was unjustified. To the West Indians, that mattered little, as it gave them a much needed confidence boost. Ten overs later, Tino Best and Powell had dug out a further three wickets, and Sri Lanka were staring down the barrel at 42 for 4. Thilan Samaraweera and Tillakaratne Dilshan paired up for 56 for the fifth wicket before Best ran out Dilshan, but this time there was little wagging from the tail, only Muttiah Muralitharan making an unbeaten 18, as Powell took the last three wickets – both Rangana Herath and Lasith Malinga ending up caught behind – and Sri Lanka subsided for 150.

However, Chaminda Vaas was determined to make up for his batting failure, and in his second over two West Indian wickets fell. First, Ryan Ramdass and Xavier Marshall confused themselves to have Ramdass run out. Next ball, Xavier Marshall launched a drive to Marvan Atapattu at mid-off, and both openers had gone – with the West Indies 9 for 2. Surviving seven balls to tea without further loss, West Indies were in for a nasty surprise, as the new batsman Runako Morton departed in Vaas' next over. However, Shivnarine Chanderpaul and Sylvester Joseph tried to rebuild, but were shaken – often beaten by Vaas and Malinga's deliveries. It had to end, and it did six overs later, when the only experienced batsman Chanderpaul was dismissed by Vaas – lbw for 13.

Cautious defence was needed for the West Indians, and Sylvester Joseph and Narsingh Deonarine provided it, eking 48 runs in 18 overs before Joseph edged to Dilshan at second slip. Deonarine survived, however, as the West Indians were 92 for 5 overnight. That did not last long, though, as Deonarine spooned a return catch to Jayasuriya with the fifth ball of the second morning, and Vaas followed up with inswingers that deceived Denesh Ramdin who was lbw for 13 and Powell who inside-edged for 0. Omari Banks, Tino Best and Jermaine Lawson staged a mini-recovery, however, with the two last partnerships eking out 47 runs, Muttiah Muralitharan removing both while conceding 37 runs. Vaas, meanwhile, was easily the pick of the bowlers, taking six for 22 with his left-arm pace.

After a frantic first four sessions, in which twenty wickets had fallen, Sri Lanka's batsmen again showed control in the second innings. Marvan Atapattu and Sanath Jayasuriya hit boundaries with ease in the opening twelve overs, taking runs at nearly five an over, before Powell and Lawson broke through in successive overs, Powell getting lucky as Atapattu sliced a cut straight to a diving Banks at backward point, while Jayasuriya gave a routine outside edge to Runako Morton. Then, Best entered with a fiery five-over spell that had Kumar Sangakkara and Mahela Jayawardene shaken up, and Jayawardene required medical treatment after one bouncer had smacked into his glove. After that, the batsmen settled into their groove, and lasted until rain stopped play on the second day, with Sri Lanka well on the way to building a challenging target.

Coming out on the third morning, it looked as though West Indies would get something back when Jayawardene and Samaraweera fell in quick succession to Jermaine Lawson, who had been reported to the ICC for chucking (or throwing) the ball, in the second over of the day, but Sangakkara and Dilshan stood firm amid showers, as Lawson and Powell worked diligently without reward. In 35 overs, the pair added 109 runs, as Sri Lanka worked their way towards a big lead. Sangakkara made it to stumps with an unbeaten 135 having hit a 200-ball century, while Omari Banks got two wickets – of Dilshan and Vaas. However, at stumps Sri Lanka were 340 for 7.

Herath and Sangakkara added 35 in nine overs on the fourth morning, as Sri Lanka declared on 375 for 7. Set 378 to win, West Indies were left to face the variations of Muralitharan – who bowled doosras and normal off-spin mixed up together as the West Indian batsmen were comprehensively deceived. Four catches went to the hands of Jayawardene who fielded at silly point – not normally the position where most catches are taken, but then again, this wasn't a usual innings. The West Indians were shown up for what they were – run-of-the-mill domestic players who should never have played international cricket, bar possibly Chanderpaul who made 24, Deonarine who even had the cheek to smash Muralitharan for six before being deceived, bowled for 29, and Denesh Ramdin who scampered together 28. Muralitharan registered his fourteenth ten-wicket haul in a match, it was the fourth time he had taken more than eight wickets, and Sri Lanka cruised to another 240-run victory – although, in all fairness, it was a difficult pitch to bat on, and the tourists had shown some promise with the bat. It showed that the West Indies desperately needed to sort out their contract problems before the next home season, however – their next away series being against Australia, which even a full-strength West Indies would struggle with.

== External sources ==
CricketArchive
