= Sunil Narine =

Trinidadian cricketer (born 1988)

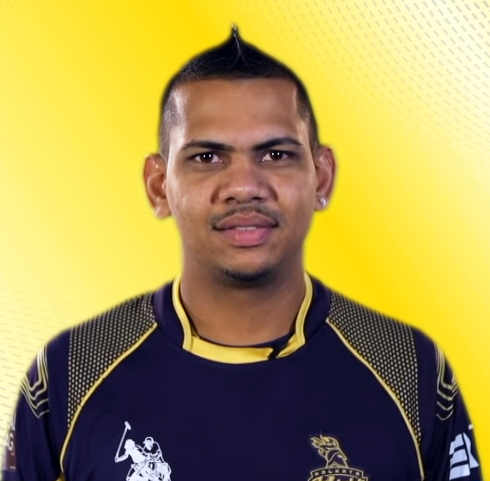
- Narine in 2014

Personal information
- Full name: Sunil Philip Narine
- Born: 26 May 1988 (age 38); Arima, Trinidad and Tobago
- Batting: Left-handed
- Bowling: Right-arm off break
- Role: All-rounder

International information
- National side: West Indies (2011–2019)
- Test debut (cap 295): 7 June 2012 v England
- Last Test: 19 December 2013 v New Zealand
- ODI debut (cap 162): 5 December 2011 v India
- Last ODI: 5 October 2016 v Pakistan
- T20I debut (cap 55): 27 March 2012 v Australia
- Last T20I: 6 August 2019 v India

Domestic team information
- Years: Team
- 2008/09–2023/24: Trinidad and Tobago
- 2012–present: Kolkata Knight Riders
- 2012/13: Sydney Sixers
- 2013–2015: Guyana Amazon Warriors
- 2013/14: Cape Cobras
- 2015–2023: Comilla Victorians
- 2016–present: Trinbago Knight Riders
- 2016/17: Melbourne Renegades
- 2017–2018: Lahore Qalandars
- 2017–2018: Dhaka Dynamites
- 2021–2023: Oval Invincibles
- 2022–2023: Surrey
- 2023–present: Abu Dhabi Knight Riders
- 2024–present: Los Angeles Knight Riders

Career statistics
Competition	Test	ODI	FC	LA
Matches	6	65	13	116
Runs scored	40	363	213	714
Batting average	8.00	11.00	21.5	13.22
100s/50s	0/0	0/0	0/0	0/1
Top score	22*	36	40*	51
Balls bowled	1,650	2,435	3023	3,783
Wickets	21	92	65	190
Bowling average	40.25	26.46	17.75	19.91
5 wickets in innings	2	2	8	6
10 wickets in match	0	0	3	0
Best bowling	6/91	6/27	8/17	6/9
Catches/stumpings	2/0	14/0	10/0	35/0
Medal record
Men's Cricket
Representing West Indies
ICC Men's T20 World Cup
Winner	2012 Sri Lanka
- Source: ESPNcricinfo, 7 January 2024

Sunil Philip Narine (born 26 May 1988) is a Trinidadian professional cricket right-arm off spinner and left-handed batter who plays for the four Knight Riders franchise teams and the Durban's Super Giants in the SA20. He represented the West Indies in international cricket between 2011 and 2019 where he was part of the squad that won the 2012 World Twenty20. Narine is considered one of the greatest Twenty20 cricketers of all time.

== Domestic and T20 franchise career ==
Narine made his debut in first-class cricket for Trinidad and Tobago in February 2009 during the Regional Four Day Competition, bowling thirteen overs without taking a wicket. He did not play another first-class match until nearly a year later, and after going wicketless in the first innings claimed a double scalp in the second, that of tail-ender Lionel Baker.

On 20 January 2011, during the Caribbean Twenty20, Narine played his first Twenty20 (T20) match but did not bowl as the match was rained off before Trinidad and Tobago could bowl. In the end, Trinidad and Tobago won the competition and Narine managed five wickets at an average of 13.40. By virtue of winning the competition, Trinidad and Tobago qualified for the 2011 Champions League Twenty20 held in September and October, in which Narine was one of three bowlers to take ten or more wickets. He made his List A debut on 20 October 2011 in the Regional Super50, claiming figures of one wicket for 35 runs (1/35); his wicket that of opening batsman Miles Bascombe. Trinidad and Tobago won the competition and Narine was the leading wicket-taker in the competition with 15 scalps, five more than the nearest competitor, fellow spin bowler Nikita Miller. Narine is the all-time leading wicket taker in Champions League T20 history with 39 scalps. In February 2012, he was bought by the Kolkata Knight Riders at $700,000 to play for them in the 2012 Indian Premier League.

In May 2018, he was named as one of the ten marquee players for the first edition of the Global T20 Canada cricket tournament. On 3 June 2018, he was selected to play for the Montreal Tigers in the players' draft for the inaugural edition of the tournament. In 2018 Indian Premier League he became the most valuable player, this was his second MVP award, after his debut season in 2012 IPL.

In October 2018, he was named in the squad for the Dhaka Dynamites team, following the draft for the 2018–19 Bangladesh Premier League. In March 2019, Narine played in his 100th match in the IPL.

In June 2019, he was selected to play for the Montreal Tigers franchise team in the 2019 Global T20 Canada tournament. In July 2020, he was named in the Trinbago Knight Riders squad for the 2020 Caribbean Premier League. In February 2021, during the 2020–21 Super50 Cup, Narine played in his 100th List A match.

In April 2022, he was bought by the Oval Invincibles for the 2022 season of The Hundred in England.

On 29 March 2024, he became the fourth player overall to play 500 T20 matches, during the 2024 Indian Premier League. He also became the first spinner and the first player from KKR to achieve the feat.

On 16 April 2024, he scored his first century in the IPL with 109 from 56 balls for Kolkata Knight Riders against Rajasthan Royals.

In IPL 2024, he won the MVP award for the 3rd time (the most by a single player), as his performance along with the overall team performance lead to KKR's 3rd title.

In 2025 Major League Cricket, he was stand in captain for Jason Holder for two matches for Los Angeles Knight Riders.

On 3 May 2026, he became the first overseas bowler to take 200 wickets in IPL History. He was named Player of the Match after scoring 55 runs from 33 balls and taking 2/14 in Trinbago Knight Riders' seven-wicket victory over Barbados Tridents in the 2026 Caribbean Premier League.

== International career ==
When the West Indies toured India in November and December 2011 Narine was included in the squad. He made his One Day International debut in the third fixture on 6 December, taking the wickets of Virat Kohli and then Ravichandran Ashwin to help the West Indies to a 16-run victory. Playing in the final two matches (both won by India) Narine took one more wicket while conceding a further 87 runs.

Back in the Caribbean, Narine played three of T&T's six matches in February 2012 in the Regional Four Day Competition, taking 31 wickets at an average of 9.61, and finishing as the team's leading wicket-taker and seventh overall. Australia arrived in the West Indies in March, and their tour began with five ODIs. Narine and West Indies fast bowler Kemar Roach each finished with eleven wickets and were joined leading wicket takers in the series which was drawn 2–2 .

Following an injury to fast bowler Kemar Roach, and the conclusion of the 2012 IPL, Narine was drafted into the West Indies squad for the third and final Test against England in June 2012. At the time he had played just six first-class matches, managing 34 wickets at an average of 11.88. Replacing fellow off spinner Shane Shillingford in the team, Narine made his Test debut on 10 June 2012.

A superb performance by Narine of five wickets for 28 runs on 16 July 2012 helped the West Indies beat New Zealand by 20 runs in their fifth and last ODI and win the current series 4–1 at Basseterre, St. Kitts. Playing only in his second Test, he was adjudged the Man of the Match after he picked eight wickets which included his maiden five-wicket haul. Narine was left out of the first 2 tests vs New Zealand.

He is the only bowler to have bowled a maiden in a Super Over in a Twenty20 match. He was left out of the 2021 ICC T20 CWC squad despite his good performance in IPL 2021, prompting several questions and reactions.

In November 2023, he announced his retirement from international cricket.

== Bowling action ==
Narine has the reputation of a "mystery bowler", due to the variations that he has on his off breaks, and how he disguises them, but has been reported for a suspect bowling action on a number of occasions. He missed playing in the final of the 2014 Champions League Twenty20 after being suspended for an illegal action with his arm bent by more than 15 degrees and in November 2015 was suspended from bowling in international cricket. His action was reported during the third ODI game against Sri Lanka. In April 2016, he was cleared for bowling in all formats of domestic and international cricket.

Narine's action was again reported during the 2018 Pakistan Super League, but was cleared soon after. In 2020, it was reported yet again, this time during the 2020 Indian Premier League. It was cleared by the IPL Suspect Bowling Action Committee later in the season.
