= Kieron Pollard =

West Indian cricketer (born 1987)

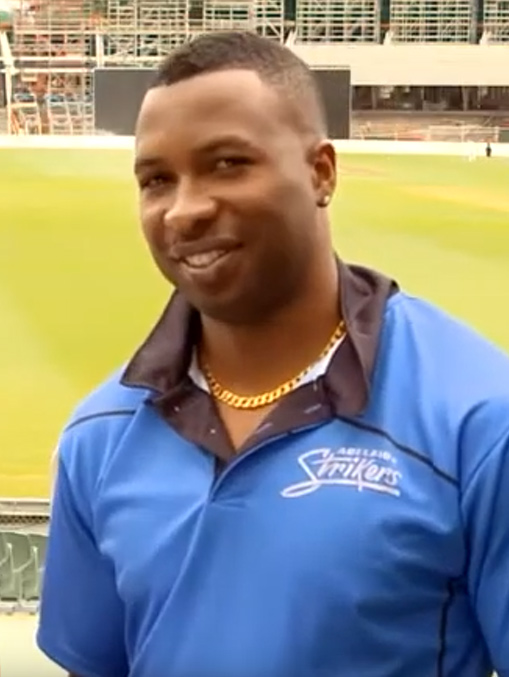
- Pollard in 2012

Personal information
- Full name: Kieron Adrian Pollard
- Born: 12 May 1987 (age 39); Tacarigua, Trinidad and Tobago
- Nickname: Polly
- Height: 6 ft 5 in (196 cm)
- Batting: Right-handed
- Bowling: Right-arm medium
- Role: Batting all-rounder

International information
- National side: West Indies (2007–2022)
- ODI debut (cap 134): 10 April 2007 v South Africa
- Last ODI: 6 February 2022 v India
- ODI shirt no.: 55
- T20I debut (cap 27): 20 June 2008 v Australia
- Last T20I: 20 February 2022 v India
- T20I shirt no.: 55

Domestic team information
- Years: Team
- 2006/07–2020/21: Trinidad and Tobago (Note: Only clubs that Pollard has played for more than one season are included in this list.)
- 2009/10–2010/11: South Australia
- 2010–2022: Mumbai Indians
- 2010–2011: Somerset
- 2012–2013: Dhaka Gladiators
- 2012/13–2016/17: Adelaide Strikers
- 2013–2017: Barbados Tridents
- 2014/15–2016/17: Cape Cobras
- 2017–2019: Dhaka Dynamites
- 2017; 2024: Karachi Kings
- 2019–2020: Peshawar Zalmi
- 2018; 2023: Multan Sultans
- 2019–present: Trinbago Knight Riders
- 2023-present: MI Emirates
- 2023-present: MI New York
- 2024; 2026: MI Cape Town
- 2027: Joburg Super Kings

Career statistics
Competition	ODI	T20I	FC	T20
Matches	123	101	27	746
Runs scored	2,706	1,569	1,584	14,803
Batting average	26.01	25.3	37.71	31.76
100s/50s	3/13	0/6	4/7	2/70
Top score	119	75*	174	104
Balls bowled	2275	856	811	6,221
Wickets	55	42	14	336
Bowling average	39.29	28.28	31.14	25.57
5 wickets in innings	0	0	1	0
10 wickets in match	0	0	0	0
Best bowling	3/27	4/25	5/36	4/15
Catches/stumpings	64/–	42/–	42/–	413/–
Medal record
Men's Cricket
Representing West Indies
ICC Men's T20 World Cup
Winner	2012 Sri Lanka
- Source: ESPNcricinfo, 26 July 2026

Kieron Adrian Pollard (born 12 May 1987) is a Trinidadian cricketer and the current head coach of the Mumbai Indians since 2026 . Internationally, he captained the West Indies cricket team in limited overs cricket. He used to play in various T20 leagues around the globe as an all-rounder, captaining franchise teams such as MI Cape Town, MI Emirates and MI New York in the SA20, ILT20 and MLC respectively. He is currently playing for the Trinbago Knight Riders in the Caribbean Premier League. He was also the batting coach of the Mumbai Indians in the Indian Premier League (IPL) and was the assistant coach of the England cricket team for the ICC Men's T20 World Cup 2024. He was part of the 2012 ICC World Twenty20 winning team for West Indies. During his period, he was one of the most aggressive batsmen and he also has the record of six 6s in an over against Sri Lanka.

In September 2019, Pollard was named as the captain of the West Indies One Day International (ODI) and Twenty20 International (T20I) teams. In March 2020, he became the first cricketer to play in 500 Twenty20 matches. His game has been suited for limited overs formats, in which he has enjoyed a long international career; he has never played Test cricket. In a match against Sri Lanka in March 2021, he hit six sixes in one over bowled by Akila Dananjaya and became the third batsman to do so in international cricket after Herschelle Gibbs and Yuvraj Singh.

On April 20, 2022, Pollard announced his retirement from international cricket. On November 15, 2022, Pollard announced his retirement from the IPL after playing for Mumbai Indians for 13 seasons. In October 2026, after four years as the side's batting coach, Pollard was appointed as Mumbai Indians' head coach.

== Early career ==
Pollard was born in Tacarigua, Trinidad and Tobago, where he was raised, along with two younger sisters, in a poor home by his single mother. Speaking about it, Pollard reflects "it wasn't ideal getting up and your mum say 'We only have X of money'." After representing Trinidad and Tobago in the 2005 TCL Group West Indies Under-19 Challenge, he was selected as part of the West Indies Under-19 cricket team to tour Pakistan. Pollard top-scored for the West Indies in the first youth One Day International (ODI), scoring 53 runs off 49 balls. Pollard made another half-century in the second match, but didn't manage to make double figures in either of last two games. He was named in the West Indies squad for the 2006 U/19 Cricket World Cup, held in Sri Lanka, where he only managed to make 19 runs in his four innings, though he did manage to take two wickets in a defeat to Australia.

During the 2006 English season, he went to England to play for Haxey CC in Lincolnshire; he played five games for the club before he was recalled by Trinidad and Tobago to play in the Stanford Twenty20. Pollard made his senior debut for Trinidad and Tobago in the twenty20 competition against the Cayman Islands in July 2006. He finished the tournament with a respectable return of six wickets, and starred in the semi-final against Nevis, scoring 83 runs off 38 balls, an innings which included 7 sixes to book Trinidad and Tobago's place in the final. He made his first-class debut six months later against Barbados, and marked the occasion with a century. As in the Twenty20, his innings contained a large number of boundaries, with 86 of his 126 runs coming from either fours or sixes. A score of 46 not out on his List A debut ensured that Pollard was in the selector's minds for the upcoming World Cup, and he described it as "a dream come true" when he was selected in the provisional 30-man squad for the tournament. Pollard's "dream run" continued with half-centuries in both four-day and 50-over matches against Guyana, followed by his second first-class century, coming against the Leeward Islands. Against Jamaica, Pollard showed his bowling ability, claiming four wickets in his seven overs to claim his fifth man of the match award in his 15th senior match. Trinidad and Tobago remained unbeaten in the 2006–07 KFC Cup, beating Windward Islands in the final to claim the trophy. Pollard finished as the competition's leading run-scorer, making 261 runs from his seven innings at an average of over 40.

The 2008–09 West Indies Cricket Board Cup saw an improvement in Pollard's bowling, as he claimed nine wickets in the competition with a bowling average of 14.22. An all-round performance against Jamaica in the semi-finals, in which he took three wickets and made 76, earned Trinidad and Tobago a place in the final, and Pollard the man of the match award.

In the 2009 Champions league T-20 for Trinidad & Tobago, Pollard hit 54 runs in just 18 balls in the 15th match against New South Wales in Hyderabad. This earned the man of the match award and his team a crucial win. His display of hitting was so impressive that NSW approached Pollard after the game and attempted to sign him for themselves.

Pollard has also represented the South Australian Redbacks in the KFC Twenty20 Big Bash and Somerset County Cricket Club for the 2010 Friends Provident t20.

Although named in the provisional 30-man squad for the 2007 ICC World Twenty20, Pollard failed to make the cut for the tournament. The absence of Pollard and Lendl Simmons from the West Indies performance squad in 2007–08 was described as "baffling" by Tony Cozier, describing how the pair "had been seemingly identified as among those for the future but have quickly been shunted aside." Pollard was disappointing as Trinidad and Tobago won the 2007–08 Stanford Twenty20, averaging nine from his three innings.

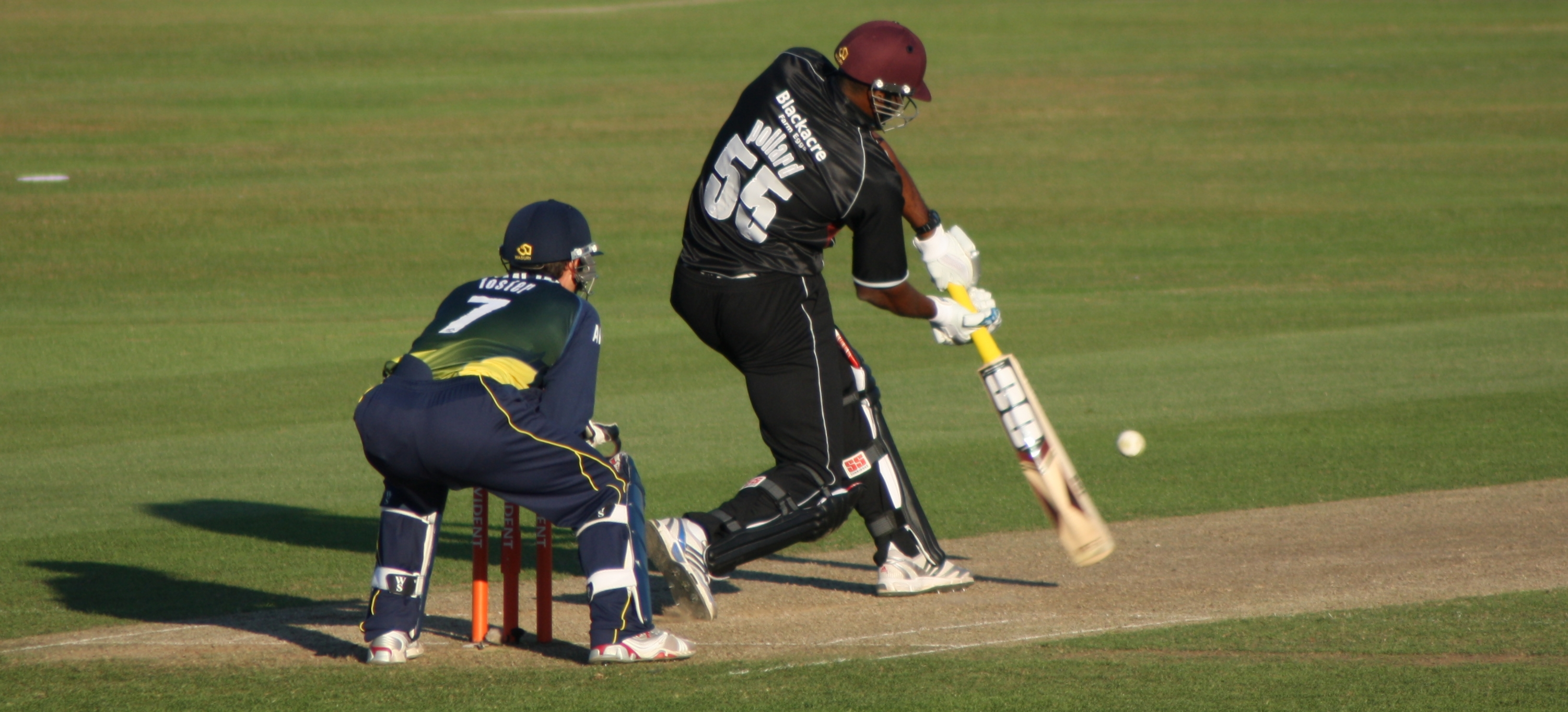
Kieron Pollard batting for Somerset during the 2010 FPt20.

=== Domestic 2010 season ===
Pollard had a successful 2010 Friends Provident t20 for Somerset, helping them to the final of the competition on 14 August 2010. He scored 354 runs during the competition at 32.18 – the second highest Somerset batting average – including two half centuries at a strike rate of 175.24 runs per 100 balls. He also took 29 wickets at 15.10, second among all Somerset's bowlers. He took an impressive catch on the boundary in the semi-final against Nottinghamshire, and then scored 22 from seven balls in the final match against Hampshire, including two sixes and a four, before Dominic Cork injured him with a bouncer that required hospital treatment.

On the back of Pollard's domestic performance, he was offered a central contract which he turned down because that would force him to be available for West Indies selection all the time and Pollard wanted to play Twenty20 cricket as well. Despite this his good performances meant that he was selected for the West Indies in the ODI and Twenty20 series against Sri Lanka as several high-profile names such as Denesh Ramdin and Ramnaresh Sarwan had been dropped.

== International career ==
Pollard was recalled to the West Indies ODI squad for the series against Sri Lanka. The match was rained off after 18.2 overs of the West Indian run-chase with Pollard not required to bat. He retained his place in the squad for the home series against Australia, but after scores of 11 and 0 in the first two matches, he was dropped for the final three.

Despite his poor form in the previous season's Stanford Twenty20, Pollard was named as part of the initial 32-member Stanford Superstars Twenty20 squad. The squad would provide the starters for the US$20 million winner-takes-all match against England later in the year. After a series of practice matches, Pollard was included in the team for the warm-up match against his Trinidad and Tobago team, where he made 24 runs off 14 balls and claimed the wicket of captain Daren Ganga. He followed this up with a nine-ball 27 against Middlesex, including three consecutive sixes in the last over. In the final, Pollard claimed the wickets of Andrew Flintoff and Luke Wright to help limit England to a total of 99, which Super Stars openers Chris Gayle and Andre Fletcher chased down in 12.4 overs.

After his impressive performance at Indian Premier League for the Mumbai Indians, the West Indian all-rounder was picked in the West Indian squad for 2010 ICC World Twenty20.

In May 2019, Cricket West Indies (CWI) named him as one of ten reserve players in the West Indies' squad for the 2019 Cricket World Cup. In December 2019, during the series against India, Pollard became the fourth batsman for the West Indies to score 1,000 runs in T20I cricket. On March 4, 2020, in the first T20I match against Sri Lanka, Pollard became the first cricketer to play in 500 Twenty20 matches. In the same match, Pollard also scored his 10,000th run in the format.

On 3 March 2021, Kieron Pollard become only the second across T20 format and overall 3rd player after Herschelle Gibbs and Yuvraj Singh to hit 6-sixes in an over

In September 2021, Pollard was named as the captain of the West Indies' squad for the 2021 ICC Men's T20 World Cup. In February 2022, in the second match against India, Pollard became the first cricketer for the West Indies to play in 100 T20I matches.

On 20 April 2022, Kieron Pollard announced his retirement on social media from all formats of international cricket during the 15th season of Indian Premier League.

Captaincy

International captaincy record
Format	Span	Matches	Won	Lost	Tied	Drawn/No result	WL Ratio
ODI	2019- 2022	17	11	6	0	0	64.7
T20I	2019- 2022	17	7	8	0	2	41.18

== Indian Premier League ==
Pollard's impressive performance in the 2009 Champions League Twenty20 and the Big Bash led to him being one of the most sought after players at the 2010 IPL auction. After some aggressive bidding, the Chennai Super Kings, Kolkata Knight Riders, Mumbai Indians and Royal Challengers Bangalore all bid the maximum allowed; $750,000. A 'silent-tiebreaker' was won by the Mumbai Indians. On 15 November 2022, Pollard announced his retirement from IPL after playing for Mumbai Indians for 13 seasons. Now he is appointed as batting coach for Mumbai Indians.

=== 2010 ===
Kieron Pollard made his debut for Mumbai Indians on 17 March 2010 against the Delhi Daredevils at Feroz Shah Kotla in Delhi. It took a while for him to get off the blocks in his first season. He however proved his money's worth in the latter stages of the tournament with a blistering 13 ball 45 laced with 5 sixes and accounted for 2 run outs earning him his first MOTM performance. This was followed by a stellar performance against the Royal Challengers Bangalore in the semi-final. Pollard smashed a quick fire 33* off 13 balls with 3 sixes and followed it up with 3 wickets and 1 run out. He was adjudged man of the match and his efforts propelled Mumbai Indians into the final for the first time where they eventually lost to the Chennai Super Kings.

=== 2011 and 2012 ===
2010 season was followed by 2 mediocre seasons for Pollard. In 2011 the only highlight was his brilliance in the field. In 2012 a sole Man of the match performance against Rajasthan Royals where he smashed a 33 ball 64 with 6 4s and 4 6s and followed it up with a career best 4-44in the 2nd innings.

=== 2013 ===
Pollard started the season strongly with a stellar knock of 57* off 38 balls with 5 sixes when Mumbai had lost early wickets and in the 2nd innings he picked up 1 wicket and a superb catch by MS Dhoni ensured Mumbai Indians victory. He was adjudged MOTM for his all round performance. Against Royal Challengers Bangalore he propelled Mumbai to a competitive score with a 16 ball-34. Arguably one of Pollard's best performances came against Sunsrisers Hyderabad. With over 60-odd runs to chase in 4 overs, Pollard joined skipper Rohit Sharma and lit the Wankhede up with a splendid 66* off 27 balls. He hit 6 sixes in a span of 7 balls and led Mumbai to an emphatic victory. Pollard saved his best performance for the final against Chennai. With Mumbai reeling at 52–4 Pollard fought back with a 60* off 32 balls to lead Mumbai to a competitive score of 148. In the 2nd innings he picked 1 wicket and Mumbai won their 1st IPL title.

=== 2014 ===
Mumbai Indians got off to a disastrous start losing their first five games in UAE. Pollard smashed 78 off 48 balls whilst chasing against SRH but he was dismissed by Irfan Pathan in the last over and Mumbai eventually lost the match.

In the first game at Wankhede against Punjab Pollard chipped in with a crucial 28 off just 12 balls and helped Mumbai register their first win of the season.

=== 2015 ===
This can be rightly called as Pollard's best season till date. Similar to 2014 Mumbai had a forgettable start to the season managing only 1 win out of the first 6 matches. Pollard struck 70 runs off 48 balls with 7 boundaries and 5 sixes against Rajasthan but Mumbai lost the match. He followed it up with another 64 runs off just 34 balls smashing 5 sixes against Chennai but again Mumbai were unable to defend their total. Chasing against the Delhi Daredevils Pollard joined Rayudu and smashed a quck-fire 26* off just 14 balls and ensured victory.

In the same week, he smashed 49 off just 24 balls with 6 sixes but Mumbai were unable to chase RCB's mammoth total. In a must win game against Kolkata Pollard played a patient knock with Hardik Pandya and helped Mumbai reach 171.

Yusuf Pathan led the KKR chase with a brilliant half century and the equation was 12 runs required off the final over. Pollard with ball in his hand dismissed Pathan on the very first ball, conceded 6 runs in the next 2 balls but followed it up with 3 dot balls to help Mumbai to a crucial victory.

In the first qualifier at Wankhede against the Super Kings Pollard helped Mumbai post a massive total of 187 with 17 ball 41 with 5 sixes and helped Mumbai reach the final. In the final against the same opposition at Eden Gardens, Pollard added 36 off just 18 balls and helped MI reach a massive total of 202.

Mumbai Indians defeated Chennai to win their 2nd IPL title. Pollard ended the tournament with 419 runs at SR of 163 and 28 sixes.

=== 2019 ===
Pollard did not have the best of IPL in this one. However he played a couple of crucial innings for his team, once again Mumbai Indians. In a low-scoring match against the Sunrisers Hyderabad, Mumbai were asked to bat first and had lost their top 3 inside the first 10 overs. From the 17th over onwards, Pollard started his massacre when he hit 4 sixes and 2 fours in that span to make a 46* off 26 balls, and get Mumbai a defendable total of 136, given their bowling. Mumbai bundled out Hyderabad for 96 runs where West Indian bowler Alzarri Joseph took 6 wickets for 12 runs in debut. Then, in a match against Kings XI Punjab, wherein Punjab gave them a target of 198 in 20 overs. Mumbai did not have the best of starts with not even 70 runs on the board after 11 overs, at the loss of 4 wickets. Pollard then took it upon himself wherein he made 83 runs off just 31 balls, which included 10 sixes and 2 fours, and ensured Mumbai did not fall short of the target even after his dismissal. In the final against CSK, he smashed a 41* of 25 deliveries, to ensure that Mumbai reached a somewhat respectable total of 149 in their allotted 20 overs. They ultimately won the tournament after a sensational final over spell by teammate Lasith Malinga, where he defended 9 runs of the final over, producing a wicket of the final delivery where 2 runs were required. He was named the ‘Super Striker of the match’.

=== 2020 ===
In his 11th consecutive year playing for the Mumbai Indians, Pollard became the first player to represent the franchise in 150 matches. Pollard played a critical role in the team winning their 5th IPL title. He was named the 'Super Striker of the Season' in IPL 2020.

=== 2023 ===
After having an ordinary season in 2022, the team was supposed to release a list of retained and released players. Due to his underperformance the previous season, he decided to retire from the IPL. Since he wasn't retained, Pollard didn’t want to play against MI and made the difficult decision to step away from the game.

== Other franchise leagues ==
On 3 June 2018, he was selected to play for the Toronto Nationals in the players' draft for the inaugural edition of the Global T20 Canada tournament. He was the leading wicket-taker in the tournament for the Toronto Nationals, with five dismissals in six matches.

Pollard was bought by Karachi Kings for US$140,000 in 2017 Pakistan Super League players draft. In a do or die match against Lahore Qalandars he scored 45 runs off 20 balls to help his team to stay in the tournament, later he was judged man of the match. He played for Multan Sultans in PSL 3. He was picked by Peshawar Zalmi in 2019 Pakistan Super League players draft.

In October 2018, he was named in the squad for the Dhaka Dynamites team, following the draft for the 2018–19 Bangladesh Premier League. In June 2019, he was selected to play for the Toronto Nationals franchise team in the 2019 Global T20 Canada tournament. In July 2020, he was named in the Trinbago Knight Riders squad for the 2020 Caribbean Premier League. In the 2023 Caribbean Premier League, league's first red card was given to his team, Trinbago Knight Riders, due to slow over-rate violations. Pollard criticized the rule, calling it "absolutely ridiculous".

In T10 League, Pollard has represented Kerala Kings and Deccan Gladiators.

In April 2022, he was bought by the London Spirit for the 2022 season of The Hundred. Pollard played the 2022 T20 Blast season for Surrey. Pollard appeared for Southern Brave in the 2024 season of The Hundred. Pollard achieved a rare feat by scoring 5 sixes in a set and also scoring 6 sixes in 6 balls in a t20i match.

On 20 June 2026, Pollard became the all time leading run scorer in T20 cricket in a MLC match for MI New York, scoring an unbeaten century against the Washington Freedom, surpassing Chris Gayle's record of 14,562 runs. On 7 October 2026, he was bought by Joburg Super Kings for 2027 SA20 season but opted out after becoming head coach of Mumbai Indians.

== Coaching career ==
In November 2022, Pollard announced his retirement from IPL and subsequently became the batting coach of the same franchise, Mumbai Indians. In December 2023, he was appointed as the assistant coach of England cricket team for the 2024 ICC Men's T20 World Cup. In January 2026, he was named as the head coach of MI London for the 2026 season of The Hundred.

In October 2026, Pollard was announced as the head coach of Mumbai Indians.

== Honours ==
West Indies

T20 World Cup - 2012

Trinidad and Tobago

Super 50 Cup - 2006–07, 2008–09, 2020–21

Caribbean T20 - 2010-11, 2011-12

Stanford T20 - 2008

Mumbai Indians

Indian Premier League - 2013, 2015, 2017, 2019, 2020

Champions League T20 - 2011, 2013

Trinbago Knight Riders

Caribbean Premier League - 2020, 2025

Barbados Royals

Caribbean Premier League - 2014

Cape Cobras

CSA T20 Challenge - 2014-15

Dhaka Dynamites

Bangladesh Premier League - 2012

MI New York

Major League Cricket - 2023, 2025

MI Emirates

International League T20 - 2024

Individual

CWI List A Player Of The Year - 2007, 2009

T20 Big Bash Player Of The Tournament - 2009-10

IPL Best Debut Performance - 2010

CWI ODI Player Of The Year- 2011

Caribbean T20 Player of the Tournament - 2011-12

IPL Player Of The Final - 2013

IPL Perfect Catch Of The Season - 2019

CPL Player Of The Tournament - 2020, 2025

IPL Super Striker Of The Season - 2020

Wisden T20 Cricketer Of The Year - 2020

ICC T20I Team Of The Decade - 2011-20
