= Denesh Ramdin =

West Indian cricketer

Personal information
- Full name: Denesh Ramdin
- Born: 13 March 1985 (age 41); Couva, Trinidad and Tobago
- Nickname: Shotta
- Batting: Right-handed
- Role: Wicket-keeper-batter

International information
- National side: West Indies (2005–2019)
- Test debut (cap 263): 13 July 2005 v Sri Lanka
- Last Test: 3 January 2016 v Australia
- ODI debut (cap 127): 31 July 2005 v India
- Last ODI: 5 October 2016 v Pakistan
- ODI shirt no.: 80
- T20I debut (cap 9): 16 November 2006 v New Zealand
- Last T20I: 6 December 2019 v India
- T20I shirt no.: 80

Domestic team information
- Years: Team
- 2004–2020: Trinidad and Tobago
- 2013–2015: Guyana Amazon Warriors
- 2016–2019, 2021: Trinbago Knight Riders
- 2018: Lahore Qalandars
- 2020: St Kitts & Nevis Patriots
- 2021–2022: Combined Campuses and Colleges

Career statistics
Competition	Test	ODI	T20I	FC
Matches	74	139	71	161
Runs scored	2,898	2,200	636	7,115
Batting average	25.85	25.00	18.70	30.02
100s/50s	4/15	2/8	0/1	15/33
Top score	166	169	55*	166*
Catches/stumpings	205/12	181/7	43/20	393/40
Medal record
Men's Cricket
Representing West Indies
ICC Men's T20 World Cup
Winner	2012 Sri Lanka
Winner	2016 India
- Source: ESPNcricinfo, 25 April 2023

Denesh Ramdin (born 13 March 1985) is a Trinidadian former cricketer who played as a right-handed wicketkeeper-batsman. Ramdin formerly captained the West Indies, Guyana Amazon Warriors, Trinidad and Tobago and the Combined Campuses and Colleges. He was a member of the West Indies team that won both the 2012 T20 World Cup and the 2016 T20 World Cup.

Ramdin scored four Test hundreds with a highest innings of 166 against England in 2009, this is the second-highest score made by a West Indies wicket-keeper in Tests. His best ODI score of 169, against Bangladesh in 2014, is also the second-highest made by a West Indies keeper in that format. Ramdin is also third, behind Jeff Dujon and Ridley Jacobs, in both Test and ODI wicketkeeping dismissals for the Windies respectively.

== Early career ==
Ramdin began playing cricket as a fast bowler but took up wicket-keeping because he was bored when not bowling. According to Ramdin he did not receive much coaching early in his career, though he did have sessions with David Williams and Jeff Dujon in which he worked on his wicket-keeping. He eventually captained both the West Indies' and Trinidad at Under-19 level.

When the West Indies toured Sri Lanka in July and August 2005, the 19-year-old Ramdin was the only wicket-keeper in the 15-man squad, taking over from the incumbent Courtney Browne. Brown did not play international cricket after he was replaced by Ramdin and retired later that year at the age of 34. At the time of his selection, Ramdin had played in just first-class games of experience with three scores above fifty including one century. On Test debut Ramdin scored 56 runs before he was bowled by Gayan Wijekoon who was also playing his first Test. The West Indies embarked on the tour with only three of their first choice players (aside from captain Shivnarine Chanderpaul the rest of the West Indies players had just one Test century between them) because of a dispute over sponsorship and as expected lost both Tests. The Indian Oil Cup 2005 with Sri Lanka and India followed the Tests and Ramdin played his first ODIs in the tournament.

The West Indies toured Australia in October and November 2005. Australia, rebuilding after losing the Ashes earlier that year, won all three Tests. The West Indies did not register a century partnership until the fourth innings of the series when Ramdin, who scored 71, combined with Dwayne Bravo in just his seventh Test. In his five other innings in the series Ramdin managed a total of 100 runs, finishing with an average of 34.20 and scoring more runs in the series that his Australian counterpart Adam Gilchrist. During the series he received advice from Gilchrist and former Australian Test 'keeper Ian Healy regarding his batting and keeping. The West Indies next engagement was against New Zealand in February and March 2006. Of the nine international matches on the tour – three Tests, five ODIs, and a Twenty20 International – the West Indies won a single ODI and drew one Test, while New Zealand won the rest. Ramdin managed just 33 runs in the Tests, and 92 runs in the ODIs However such was Ramdin's importance to the side that he was one of seven players the West Indies Cricket Board were considering to take over as captain when Shivnarine Chanderpaul resigned from the position in April.

== Dropped ==
At this time Ramdin was competed to be first-choice wicket-keeper spot to Carlton Baugh in ODIs. Ultimately, only Ramdin was selected for the 2007 World Cup. However, Ramdin went on to cement his place as the West Indies wicket keeper in all forms of the game and was the vice-captain at one point, following the resignation from that position of Ramnaresh Sarwan. Ramdin scored his maiden Test century against England in the fourth Test at Barbados in 2009, going on to score 166 in a drawn match. He hit two centuries in the 2009–10 Regional Four Day Competition in the West Indies, at an average of 113.33, amassing 340 runs in 6 innings.

When South Africa toured in May and June 2010 Ramdin managed 63 runs in the three-Test series and 34 runs from five ODIs. The run of poor form meant Ramdin's central contract with the West Indies Cricket Board (WICB) was not renewed in August 2010. After a 2010–11 season in which Ramdin scored 460 runs in the Regional Four Day Competition, he was recalled to the team for the ODI series against India. When the WICB announced its list of centrally contracted players in October 2011 Ramdin was not included.

== Trinidad and Tobago captaincy and return ==
In November 2011 Trinidad and Tobago named Ramdin as their captain, replacing Darren Ganga. Under his leadership, Trinidad & Tobago won the Caribbean Twenty20 held in January 2012. Ramdin followed this up by finishing as his team's leading run-scorer in the 2011–12 Regional Four Day Competition. When the West Indies toured India in November and December Ramdin was the first-choice wicket-keeper for the ODI leg and played in all five matches. He managed 164 runs in the series, 96 of which came in a 153-run loss to India in the fourth ODI. The innings was the highest score by a West Indies 'keeper in ODIs. The West Indies lost the five-match series 4–1.

A broken right thumb sustained in March forced him to miss the ODI series against Australia that month. After recovering from the injury Ramdin was recalled to the Test squad to tour England in May and July, replacing Baugh who had not contributed as many runs as the selectors hoped. Playing his first Tests since 2010 he set himself a target of scoring three half-centuries in the three-Test series. West Indies lost the first two matches and Ramdin made scores of 6, 43, 1 and 6, prompting former player Viv Richards to remark "Ramdin just looks out of sorts. When he first came into the game I felt he was a huge prospect. For some reason he has deteriorated in such a big way. Just the way he is walking back, he looks like a totally lost guy." In the final Test of the series Ramdin struck his second Test century, managing 107 not out. At the fall of the ninth wicket Ramdin was joined by Tino Best and the pair built a 143-run partnership, the highest stand for the tenth wicket by the West Indies and the third highest in Test history. On reaching his century, Ramdin produced a piece of paper from his pocket on which he had written a message for Richards the night before. The message read "Yea Viv Talk Nah". The ICC fined Ramdin 20% of his match fee for "conduct contrary to the spirit of the game". He later expressed regret over the incident, exclaiming; "It's been a few years since that incident. What I did then happened at the heat of moment. When I look back, today perhaps with age, I have become wiser and would not have taken that piece of paper out of my trouser's pocket,"..."I have put the past behind and now myself and Viv are good friends."

In the 2013 ICC Champions Trophy, Ramdin claimed a catch from batsman Misbah-ul-Haq. However television replays showed that the ball was not caught, and the matter was referred to the match referee. Ramdin was fined his full match fee and suspended for two matches.

In July 2013, Ramdin was dropped from West Indian squad for the first two ODIs against Pakistan in Guyana. Ramdin has hit only one half-century since his recall to the West Indies one-day side in October 2011 and has been dropped in several recent matches both during the Champions Trophy and the home tri-series which also featured India and Sri Lanka. In Ramdin's absence West Indies used opener Johnson Charles behind the stumps, and haven't picked any specialist wicketkeeper in the squad.

In December 2013, Ramdin scored 107, in the third test against New Zealand at Seddon Park. This is the highest score by a West Indian wicketkeeper vs New Zealand in test match cricket. Ramdin's knock was also his third century in an away test, equalling Clyde Walcott's record for most overseas hundreds by a West Indies wicketkeeper.

His 200-run partnership with Shivnarine Chanderpaul was only the eighth double-century partnership for the sixth wicket by West Indies batsmen. Ramdin and Chanderpaul came together with the West Indies score at 86 for 5 – the lowest score at which a West Indies pair, where the batsmen added 200 or more runs for the sixth or lower wickets, had begun the partnership.

In March 2014, Ramdin notched his maiden hundred in the third and final One-Day International against England. Ramdin scored 128, the first century by a West Indies wicket-keeper in ODIs though the regional side eventually fell short by 25 runs, to concede the series 2–1.

In August 2014, Ramdin scored 169 in the third and final ODI against Bangladesh at Warner Park, Basseterre, Saint Kitts. He then and there notched the highest ODI score by a West Indian batsman at home in the Caribbean surpassing Desmond Haynes' 152 not out against India at Bourda in Georgetown, Guyana in 1989. This was also the highest ODI score by a West Indian wicketkeeper. Ramdin's hit 11 sixes in his knock, the second highest by a West Indies batsman in ODIs, one short of Xavier Marshall's 12 sixes against Canada in 2008. Ramdin's 11 sixes in this match are also the highest by a wicketkeeper in an innings, beating Mahendra Singh Dhoni's 10 sixes against Sri Lanka at Sawai Mansingh Stadium in Jaipur in 2005.

In March 2014, Ramdin affected four stumpings in Pakistan's innings at Sher-e-Bangla National Cricket Stadium in Mirpur equalling the record for the most stumpings in a T20 international. He was named as wicket keeper of the 'Team of the Tournament' by Cricinfo. Kamran Akmal also had affected four stumpings in a match against the Netherlands in the 2009 World T20.

== Test and franchise captaincy ==
In May 2014, Ramdin was named captain of the Test side and took over from Darren Sammy who remained the T20 captain. West Indies then had three separate captains for all three formats with Dwayne Bravo as ODI skipper. Ramdin's first assignment was the home series against New Zealand which began with a 2–1 series loss in June 2014.

Ramdin was also appointed, in May 2014, as captain of Caribbean Premier League outfit Guyana Amazon Warriors. He later skippered the Combined Campuses and Colleges in their 2022-23 Super50 Cup campaign.

=== T20 franchise career ===
On 3 June 2018, he was selected to play for the Montreal Tigers in the players' draft for the inaugural edition of the Global T20 Canada tournament. In July 2020, he was named in the St Kitts & Nevis Patriots squad for the 2020 Caribbean Premier League.

== Personal life ==
He is an ethnic Indo-Trinidadian and a practising Hindu.
