= Anthony Alleyne =

Barbadian cricketer (born 1993)

Personal information
- Full name: Anthony Trevor Alleyne
- Born: 27 June 1993 (age 33); Barbados
- Nickname: Eddy
- Batting: Left-handed
- Bowling: Right-arm medium
- Role: Opening batsman

Domestic team information
- Years: Team
- 2013–2016: Combined Campuses
- 2016–2019: Barbados
- FC debut: 9 February 2013 Combined Campuses v Windward Islands
- Last FC: 31 January 2019 Barbados v Windward Islands
- LA debut: 4 April 2013 Combined Campuses v Guyana
- Last LA: 25 February 2017 UWI Vice Chancellor's XI v England XI

Career statistics
Competition	FC	LA
Matches	30	17
Runs scored	1,360	426
Batting average	24.72	26.62
100s/50s	1/7	0/4
Top score	186	99
Catches/stumpings	21/0	5/0
- Source: , 4 February 2018

Anthony Trevor Alleyne (born 27 June 1993) is a Barbadian cricketer who has represented both the Barbadian national team and the Combined Campuses and Colleges in West Indian domestic cricket. He is left-handed opening batsman.

Alleyne represented the West Indies under-19s at the 2012 Under-19 World Cup in Australia, scoring 52 against India in the opening match of the tournament. The previous year, playing against Australia in an under-19 Test match, he had scored a century, 106 from 136 balls. Alleyne made his first-class debut during the 2012–13 Regional Four Day Competition, playing for the Combined Campuses against the Windward Islands. Opening the batting with Shacaya Thomas in the first innings of the match, he scored 84 from 157 balls. In the 2012–13 Regional Super50, played later in the year, Alleyne scored 158 runs in three matches, including 58 on debut against Guyana and 99 in the semi-final against Trinidad and Tobago.

In November 2016, Alleyne made his first-class debut for Barbados, scoring 19 and 84 in a match against the Leeward Islands in the 2016–17 Regional Four Day Competition. In the next game, against Trinidad and Tobago, he scored 88 from 201 balls in the first innings and 186 from 215 balls in the second, with the latter being his maiden first-class century.
