= 2008–09 Regional Four Day Competition =

Cricket tournament

- Administrator: West Indies Cricket Board
- Cricket format: First-class cricket (4 days)
- Champions: Jamaica (9th title)
- Participants: 7
- Matches: 42
- Most runs: 1,068 – Narsingh Deonarine (Guyana)
- Most wickets: 60 – Ryan Austin (Combined Campuses and Colleges)

The 2008–09 Regional Four Day Competition was the 43rd domestic first-class cricket tournament held in the West Indies, it took place from 9 January 2009 – 14 April 2009. Each team played the other twice, one played at home and the other away. Jamaica won the tournament after finishing top of the table with seven wins from their twelve matches. It was their 2nd tournament win in succession and their 9th overall.

Narsingh Deonarine of Guyana finished as the tournament's highest run-scorer, he made 1,068 runs at an average of 59.33, including two centuries and a highest score of 198. The leading wicket-taker in the competition was Ryan Austin of the Combined Campuses and Colleges, he took 60 wickets at an average of 24.06 with best innings figures of 6/123.

== Points table ==
Team	Pld	W	L	T	D	Aban	Pts
Jamaica	12	7	2	0	3	0	106
Windward Islands	12	6	5	0	1	0	79
Leeward Islands	12	5	4	0	3	0	77
Trinidad and Tobago	12	2	2	0	8	0	70
Barbados	12	4	5	0	3	0	60
Combined Campuses and Colleges	12	4	4	0	4	0	60
Guyana	12	0	6	0	6	0	33
Source:Cricinfo

== Points allocation ==
- Won 12
- Lost: 0
- Lost but won on 1st innings: 4
- Won on 1st innings in drawn match: 6
- Lost on 1st innings in drawn match: 3
- No Decision on 1st innings: 4
- Abandoned without a ball bowled: 4
