= Dalton Polius =

Saint Lucian cricketer (born 1990)

Personal information
- Born: 12 September 1990 (age 36); Saint Lucia
- Batting: Left-handed
- Bowling: Right-arm off spin

Domestic team information
- Years: Team
- 2011–2015: Windward Islands, West Indies Under 19’s, St Lucia zouks, Sagicor West Indies High Performance Centre
- Source: CricketArchive, 20 January 2016

Dalton Polius (born 12 September 1990) is a Saint Lucian cricketer who has played for the Windward Islands in West Indies domestic cricket. He is a right-arm off-spin bowler who bats left-handed.

Polius made his List A debut in October 2009, playing a single match for the West Indies under-19s in the 2009–10 WICB President's Cup. His first-class debut for the Windward Islands came in March 2011, when he played against the England Lions in the 2010–11 Regional Four Day Competition. In just his second match, which was a semi-final against the Combined Campuses and Colleges, Polius took a maiden five-wicket haul, 5/50. He made his maiden first-class half-century against the same team, scoring 77 from 143 balls in the opening match of the 2012–13 Regional Four Day.
