= Marlon Barclay =

Trinidadian cricketer (born 1987)

Personal information
- Born: 23 October 1987 (age 39); Trinidad
- Source: Cricinfo, 27 November 2020

Marlon Barclay (born 23 October 1987) is a Trinidadian cricketer. He played in four first-class matches for Trinidad and Tobago in 2012.

== See also ==
- List of Trinidadian representative cricketers
