= Shacaya Thomas =

Jamaican cricketer

Personal information
- Full name: Shacaya Elrick Thomas
- Born: 25 September 1988 (age 38); Saint Catherine Parish, Jamaica
- Batting: Right-handed

Domestic team information
- Years: Team
- 2010: West Indies HPC
- 2011–2015: Combined Campuses
- 2014–present: Jamaica
- 2014: Antigua Hawksbills (CPL)

Career statistics
Competition	FC	LA	T20
Matches	104	45	50
Runs scored	13627	4783	2275
Batting average	56.82	51.78	43.25
100s/50s	36/42	13/25	3/12
Top score	376	161*	114*
Balls bowled	7100	12	–
Wickets	300	1	–
Bowling average	23	14.00	–
5 wickets in innings	12	0	–
10 wickets in match	3	0	–
Best bowling	6/12	1/14	–
Catches/stumpings	141/0	7/0	0/0
- Source: CricketArchive, 7 May 2017

Shacaya Elrick Thomas (born 25 September 1988) is a Jamaican cricketer who has played for both Jamaica and the Combined Campuses and Colleges in West Indian domestic cricket.

A right-handed top-order batsman, Thomas represented the West Indies under-19s at the 2008 Under-19 World Cup in Malaysia. He also played for the team in the 2007–08 KFC Cup, where matches held List A status. Thomas was also a member of the West Indies High Performance Centre for a time, and played for the HPC team in the 2010–11 WICB Cup. For the following season, he switched to the Combined Campuses, making his first-class debut in February 2011, in the 2010–11 Regional Four Day Competition. Against Guyana in the 2013–14 Regional Four Day Competition, Thomas scored a maiden first-class century, 176 from 274 balls, opening the batting with Anthony Alleyne. He scored another century, 116 from 189 balls, in the following match against Trinidad and Tobago, and finished the season as his team's leading run-scorer (and second only to Jermaine Blackwood across the whole competition). For the 2014–15 season, Thomas transferred to Jamaica, playing for his home country for the first time. He also signed with the Antigua Hawksbills franchise for the 2014 Caribbean Premier League season, and was crucial toward their retention of the title, winning Antigua's and the league's player of the year. He then joined Horsley and Send CC in 2017 and was key to the development of key youth prospects Louis Barber and Jared Hunt.
