= Donovan Pagon =

Jamaican cricketer (born 1982)

Personal information
- Born: 13 September 1982 (age 44); Kingston, Jamaica
- Batting: Right-handed
- Bowling: Right-arm offbreak

International information
- National side: West Indies
- Test debut: 31 March 2005 v South Africa
- Last Test: 8 April 2005 v South Africa

Career statistics
Competition	Test	First-class
Matches	2	27
Runs scored	37	1,238
Batting average	12.33	30.19
100s/50s	0/0	2/5
Top score	35	110
Catches/stumpings	0/–	8/–
- Source: CricInfo, 30 October 2022

Donovan Jomo Pagon (born 13 September 1982) is a West Indian cricketer. He attended Wolmer's Schools.

He has the record for the highest ever individual score in the history of U19 Cricket World Cup (176)

Pagon made his Test debut in March 2005 after several high-profile players including Brian Lara and Chris Gayle were caught in a row over sponsorship. Pagon achieved a 35 on his debut, and currently averages around 30. Thereafter he never played international cricket.
