= Nelon Pascal =

West Indian cricketer (born 1987)

Personal information
- Full name: Nelon Troy Pascal
- Born: 25 April 1987 (age 39); St. David's, Grenada
- Batting: Right-handed
- Bowling: Right-arm fast
- Role: Bowler

International information
- National side: West Indies
- Test debut (cap 284): 10 June 2010 v South Africa
- Last Test: 1 December 2010 v Sri Lanka
- Only ODI (cap 148): 26 July 2009 v Bangladesh

Domestic team information
- Years: Team
- 2006–2007/08: Grenada
- 2007/08–2014/15: Windward Islands
- 2013: St Lucia Zouks

Career statistics
Competition	Test	ODI	FC	LA
Matches	2	1	57	23
Runs scored	12	0	411	59
Batting average	6.00	0.00	6.52	7.37
100s/50s	0/0	0/0	0/0	0/0
Top score	10	0	36	18*
Balls bowled	102	24	7,391	1,062
Wickets	0	0	154	45
Bowling average	–	–	30.20	20.71
5 wickets in innings	0	0	5	0
10 wickets in match	0	0	0	0
Best bowling	0/27	0/29	5/50	4/33
Catches/stumpings	1/–	0/–	24/–	1/–
- Source: ESPNcricinfo, 14 August 2025

Nelon Troy Pascal (born 25 April 1987 in St David's, Grenada) is a former cricketer who represented the West Indies in Test and One Day International (ODI) cricket. He was a fast bowler who batted and bowled right handed. His main first-class and List A cricket was for the Windward Islands. He played for the West Indies in the 2006 U-19 Cricket World Cup in Sri Lanka. He spent 2008 in England playing club cricket for Boldon CC in the Durham Senior League.

Pascal was selected for the West Indies tour squad to England in 2009 where he played warm-up matches against Essex and Derbyshire. He made his first international appearance in 2009 in an ODI against Bangladesh, followed by two appearances for the Test side in 2010.
