= Romel Currency =

West Indian cricketer (born 1982)

Rome Currency
Personal information
- Full name: Romel Kwesi Currency
- Born: 1 May 1982 (age 44); Mesopotamia, Saint Vincent
- Batting: Right-handed
- Bowling: Right-arm off-break
- Relatives: Sunil Ambris (half-brother)

Domestic team information
- Years: Team
- 2000–2014/15: Windward Islands
- 2001/02: Southern Windward islands
- 2002/03–2007/08: St Vincent and the Grenadines
- 2007/08–2011/12: Combined Campuses and Colleges
- FC debut: 1 September 2000 Windward Islands v South Africa A
- Last FC: 20 March 2015 Windward Islands v Guyana
- LA debut: 12 October 2000 Windward Islands v Guyana
- Last LA: 7 February 2014 Windward Islands v Ireland

Career statistics
Competition	FC	LA	T20
Matches	71	36	14
Runs scored	2,886	987	282
Batting average	23.27	31.83	20.14
100s/50s	1/15	1/6	0/0
Top score	121*	102*	48
Balls bowled	233	163	84
Wickets	3	7	7
Bowling average	35.33	19.57	14.00
5 wickets in innings	0	0	0
10 wickets in match	0	0	0
Best bowling	2/22	3/20	4/8
Catches/stumpings	53/–	11/–	5/–
- Source: CricInfo, 20 August 2018

Romel Kwesi Currency (born 7 May 1982) is a former West Indian cricketer who played first-class cricket and List A cricket for the Windward Islands. He was born at Mesopotamia on Saint Vincent.

Currency made his debut for the Windward Islands in 2000, playing for the side until the 2014/15 season. In total he played in 71 first-class matches in his career, including 26 for Combined Campuses and Colleges (CCC) whilst he was a student. He captained the CCC side in the Caribbean T20 tournament between 2010/11 and 2011/12. As of August 2018 Currency and Devon Smith held the record for the highest first-wicket partnership made in first-class cricket by the Windward Islands, scoring 309 runs against Kenya at Kingstown in February 2004, Currency scoring his only first-class century during the partnership.

Sunil Ambris, who has played international cricket for the West Indies, is Currency's younger half-brother. Ambris has said that Currency has been a major influence on his career.
