= Tamar Lambert =

Jamaican cricketer

Personal information
- Full name: Tamar Lansford Lambert
- Born: 15 July 1981 (age 45); Saint Catherine Parish, Jamaica
- Batting: Right-handed
- Bowling: Right-arm off spin

Domestic team information
- Years: Team
- 2000–2016: Jamaica
- Source: CricketArchive, 28 December 2015

Tamar Lansford Lambert (born 15 July 1981) is a Jamaican cricketer who made his debut for the Jamaican national side in September 2000. A right-handed batsman and right-arm off spin bowler, he was first named captain of the team during the 2004–05 season, aged 23, and continued to captain Jamaica in most formats of the game until the 2014–15 season.

== Playing career ==
Lambert was born in Saint Catherine Parish. His senior debut for Jamaica came at the age of 19, when he played a List A match against a touring South Africa A team. After that match, Lambert did not play again until January 2004, when he made his first-class debut against the Windward Islands in the 2003–04 Carib Beer Cup. Against Guyana during the 2006–07 season of the same tournament, he recorded a maiden first-class century, 110 from 218 balls.

During the 2008–09 Regional Four Day Competition, Lambert scored 759 runs from 12 matches, making him Jamaica's leading run-scorer (and seventh in the competition). His season included only a single century, however, an innings of 143 against Barbados. The following season, Lambert took his first and only first-class five-wicket haul, 8/42 against the Combined Campuses and Colleges, also finishing with match figures of 10/63. Only two Jamaicans have taken better figures in a first-class innings (Gavin Wallace and Nikita Miller).
