= Justin Athanaze =

West Indian cricketer (born 1988)

Justin Jason Athanaze (born 29 January 1988) is a cricketer who has played for the Leeward Islands cricket team in West Indian domestic competitions. As of December 2018, he has played 25 first-class, 36 List A and 21 T20 cricket matches, having made making his debut in January 2007.

Athanaze was born in Antigua and played for Antigua Hawksbills in the 2014 Caribbean Premier League. In October 2019, he was named in the Leeward Islands' squad for the 2019–20 Regional Super50 tournament. Contrary to popular belief he has no family relations to Alick Athanaze who is also a cricketer but is from Dominica.
