= Clancy Mack =

West Indian cricket umpire

Personal information
- Born: 9 December 1955 (age 70); Antigua

Umpiring information
- ODIs umpired: 1 (2001)
- WODIs umpired: 1 (2011)
- WT20Is umpired: 6 (2011–2012)
- Source: Cricinfo, 25 May 2014

Clancy Mack (born 9 December 1955) is a former West Indian cricket umpire. Internationally, he only officiated in one ODI game in 2001.

== See also ==
- List of One Day International cricket umpires
