= Shane Shillingford =

West Indian cricketer

Personal information
- Born: 22 February 1983 (age 43); Dublanc, Dominica
- Batting: Right-handed
- Bowling: Right-arm off-break
- Role: Bowler

International information
- National side: West Indies
- Test debut (cap 285): 10 June 2010 v South Africa
- Last Test: 30 June 2014 v New Zealand

Domestic team information
- Years: Team
- 2000–2020: Windward Islands
- 2013–2017: St Lucia Zouks

Career statistics
Competition	Test	FC	LA	T20
Matches	16	132	75	53
Runs scored	266	2,667	588	94
Batting average	13.30	14.41	15.07	5.87
100s/50s	0/1	0/10	0/0	0/0
Top score	53*	65	45	21*
Balls bowled	4,694	31,564	3,825	1,031
Wickets	70	587	107	52
Bowling average	34.55	24.32	21.55	20.92
5 wickets in innings	6	43	1	0
10 wickets in match	2	11	0	0
Best bowling	6/49	8/33	6/32	4/16
Catches/stumpings	9/–	70/–	21/–	11/–
- Source: ESPNcricinfo, 18 February 2021

Shane Shillingford (born 22 February 1983) is a West Indian cricketer who played first-class and List A cricket for the Windward Islands and Test cricket for the West Indies cricket team.

== Early life ==
Shillingford was born on 22 February 1983 in Dublanc, Dominica.

== Domestic career ==
He played for various teams within the West Indian cricket system, including the Windward Islands cricket team and the Saint Lucia Kings. On 4 March 2021 it was announced that Shillingford has joined Home Counties Premier League, Division 1 side Buckingham Town. He continued to play amateur cricket after his professional retirement, including an award-winning performance during the St. Vincent & Grenadines International masters T20 event in November 2025, having helped win the game for the North East Masters against New York Masters at the field adjacent to the Arnos Vale Stadium, scoring 87 from 33 balls.

== International career ==
Shillingford made his Test debut on 10 June 2010 in the home series against South Africa and played in three matches in that series. He then toured Sri Lanka with the 2010–11 West Indies team and took five wickets in his first test match of the tour: four in the first innings triggering a Sri Lankan collapse and instigating a follow-on. However half of the third day was washed out in rain and Sri Lanka rallied after the follow-on and salvaged a draw.

== Bowling action ==
On 20 November 2010 straight after his first international match, the stood umpires Asad Rauf, Richard Kettleborough and Steve Davis reported Shillingford for a suspect action. It was found that Shillingford bent his arm by 17 degrees while bowling, rendering his action illegal and on 21 December 2010 the International Cricket Council announced he had been suspended from bowling in international cricket until his action could be remodelled and reassessed. Following the news that Shillingford could not bowl in international cricket, he was dropped from the Windward Islands' squad for the 2010–11 Caribbean Twenty20. Instead he was sent to the Sagicor High Performance Centre to work on his bowling action for three-months. After testing in May 2011, it was announced that Shillingford's action was legal and he would be allowed to resume bowling in international cricket.

In January 2019, Shillingford was suspended from bowling in domestic cricket matches, after his action was deemed to be illegal.

== International return ==
After his bowling action was cleared, Shillingford began his return to the West Indies set up, and in September 2011 he was included in the Test squad to tour Bangladesh, though he did not play. The 2011/12 season marked Shillingford's return to the Windward Islands' squad after working on his action, and his return of 38 wickets from just five first-class matches was the equal third-highest tally in the Regional Four Day Competition. After the tournament concluded, Australia toured the West Indies and Shillingford was included in the squad for the second Test in April 2012. The match was his first Test since November 2010.

Shillingford became the first Dominican to play international cricket on his home soil in a Test series in 2012 between Australia and West Indies; he took six wickets in the first innings and four in the second, making him the first West Indian spinner to take ten wickets in a test since Lance Gibbs in 1966.

The West Indies embarked on a tour of England in May 2012. Shillingford was not selected in the first Test because he struggled to grip the ball in the cold weather, and partly because conditions were expected to be better suited to seam bowlers. He returned for the second Test, but managed just one wicket in the match while conceding 138 runs.

In the 1st Test against New Zealand at Sabina Park in Kingston on 11 June 2014, Shillingford put on 81 runs off 56 balls for the 10th wicket with Sulieman Benn, the highest 10th wicket partnership ever at Sabina Park. Shillingford scored an unbeaten 53 off just 29 balls. His fifty came off just 25 balls, the fourth fastest Test fifty after Jacques Kallis. However, New Zealand won by 186 runs. Shillingford has the world record for top scoring for his team as a number 11 batsman in the 4th innings of a test match (53*), where his team bowled out for 216 v New Zealand. Also he was the 10th player when batting at number 11 position to top score for his team in a test innings and was only the third player to top score for his team in the 4th innings of a test match.
