= Odean Brown =

Jamaican cricketer (born 1982)

Personal information
- Born: 8 February 1982 (age 44); Westmoreland, Jamaica
- Source: Cricinfo, 3 January 2016

Odean Brown (born 8 February 1982) is a Jamaican cricketer. He made his first class debut on 12 February 2004 in the Carib Beer Cup tournament.
