= Ryan Austin (cricketer) =

West Indies cricketer (born 1981)

Personal information
- Full name: Ryan Anthony Austin
- Born: 15 November 1981 (age 44); Arima, Trinidad and Tobago
- Batting: Right-handed
- Bowling: Right-arm off-break

International information
- National side: West Indies
- Test debut (cap 274): 9 July 2009 v Bangladesh
- Last Test: 17 July 2009 v Bangladesh

Domestic team information
- Years: Team
- 2000/01–2006/07: Barbados
- 2008/09–2014/15: Combined Campuses and Colleges

Career statistics
Competition	Test	FC	LA	T20
Matches	2	74	19	13
Runs scored	39	913	46	9
Batting average	9.75	10.14	6.57	9.00
100s/50s	0/0	0/1	0/0	0/0
Top score	19	56*	13*	4*
Balls bowled	326	15,931	858	264
Wickets	3	317	13	12
Bowling average	51.66	23.18	36.46	23.58
5 wickets in innings	0	19	0	0
10 wickets in match	0	3	0	0
Best bowling	1/29	8/64	2/24	3/17
Catches/stumpings	3/–	26/–	4/–	3/–
- Source: CricketArchive, 23 April 2023

Ryan Anthony Austin (born 15 November 1981) is a former West Indies international cricketer.

A lower-order right-handed batsman and a right-arm off-spin bowler, Austin played 22 first-class matches for Barbados between the 2000–01 and 2006–07 seasons, and five for West Indies B in the 2003–04 season.

His highest score in first-class cricket was 56 not out in a losing cause for Barbados against Windward Islands at Bridgetown in 2001–02. He has taken five wickets or more in an innings four times, and his best bowling was six for 86 for Barbados against Leeward Islands at Crab Hill in the Carib Beer Cup in 2006–07, when he was also named Man of the Match.

Austin made his Test debut on 9 July 2009. He was part of an understrength team fielded by the West Indies against Bangladesh; the 15-man squad included nine uncapped players. Including Austin, seven West Indies players made their Test debut in the match and the side was captained by Floyd Reifer who had played the last of his four Tests ten years earlier. The first XI had made themselves unavailable due to a pay dispute with the West Indies Cricket Board.
