= Narsingh Deonarine =

West Indian cricketer

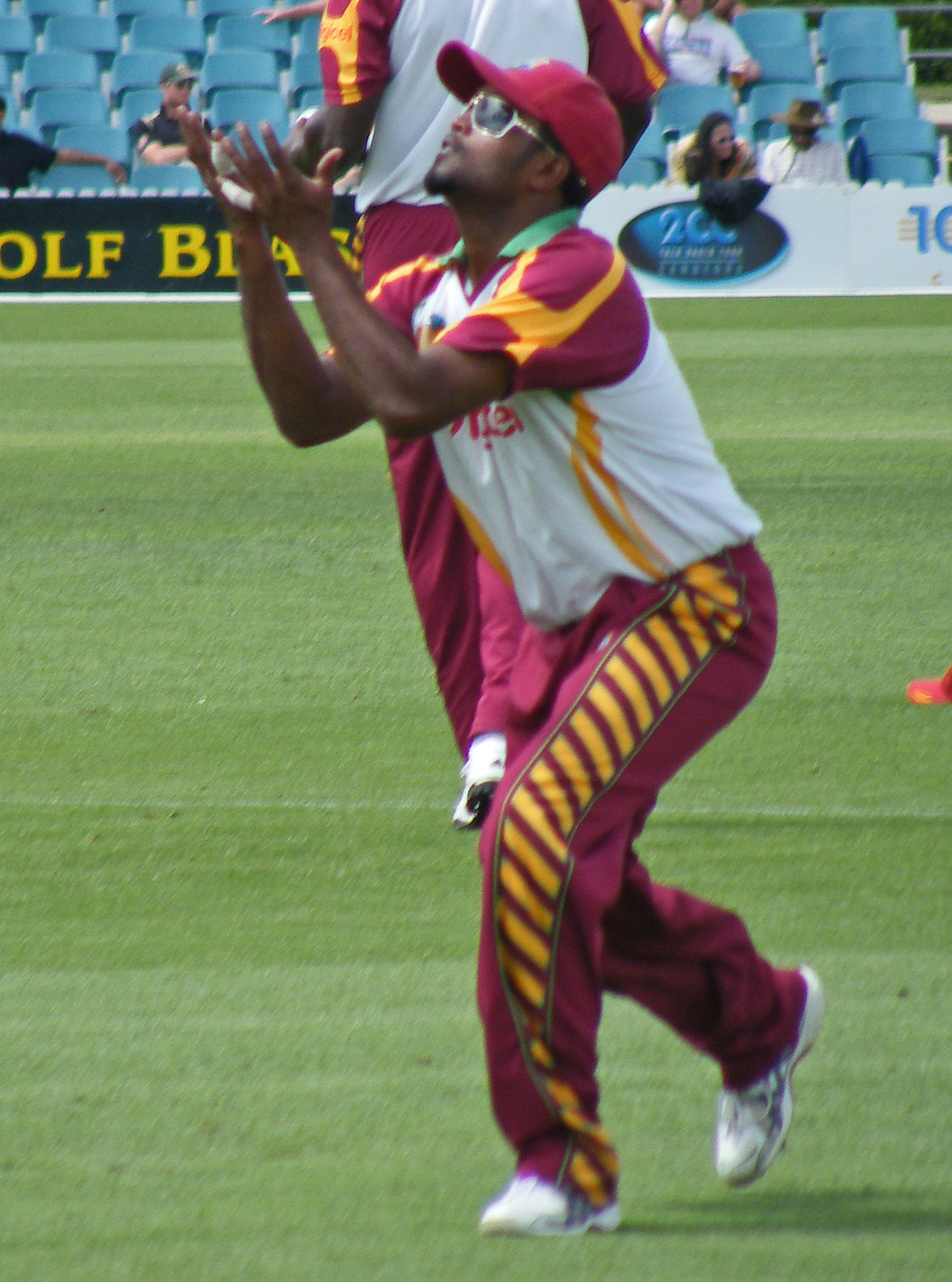

Personal information
- Born: 16 August 1983 (age 43); Albion, Berbice, Guyana
- Nickname: Ringo
- Batting: Left-handed
- Bowling: Right arm off break
- Role: All-rounder

International information
- National side: West Indies (2005–2015)
- Test debut (cap 258): 31 March 2005 v South Africa
- Last Test: 19 December 2013 v New Zealand
- ODI debut (cap 126): 31 July 2005 v India
- Last ODI: 28 January 2015 v South Africa
- T20I debut (cap 39): 21 February 2010 v Australia
- Last T20I: 13 February 2013 v Australia

Domestic team information
- Years: Team
- 2000–2014: Guyana
- 2013–2016: Guyana Amazon Warriors
- 2015–2016: Trinidad and Tobago
- 2021-present: Silicon Valley Strikers (squad no. 14)

Career statistics
Competition	Tests	ODIs	FC	LA
Matches	16	26	111	94
Runs scored	676	591	6,310	2,036
Batting average	28.16	28.14	36.90	25.45
100s/50s	0/5	0/4	9/42	1/13
Top score	82	65*	198	102*
Balls bowled	1,379	459	8,912	1,885
Wickets	23	6	133	32
Bowling average	28.65	71.33	31.73	47.71
5 wickets in innings	0	0	3	0
10 wickets in match	0	0	0	0
Best bowling	4/37	2/18	7/26	3/25
Catches/stumpings	15/–	8/–	75/–	27/–
- Source: Cricinfo, 23 January 2021

Narsingh Deonarine (born 16 August 1983) is a Guyanese cricketer, who has played for the West Indies.

== Domestic and franchise career ==
He is a left-handed batsman who bowls a right-arm off break. He made his debut for Guyana at the age of 17, and after captaining the West Indies under 19 team in 2002, he made headlines after hitting a century against the touring Australians the following year. Deonarine then had a spell in England with Whitehaven Cricket Club in 2004. He first came into the West Indies squad after contract disputes saw seven players left out of the South African Test of March 2005. Similarities in the fielding techniques and skill at cover point exist between Deonarine and his team-mate Shivnarine Chanderpaul—a man who Deonarine has clearly modelled his game on.

Narsingh's claim to fame came on 13 August 2006 at the Stanford 20/20 finals which saw Guyana vs. Trinidad in a classic million dollar match. After Trinidad put up a formidable 176 runs, Guyana answered back with 171 with 2 balls remaining. Narsingh was at the striker's end with Ramnaresh Sarwan at the bowlers end. Narsingh hit a 6 to win it for Guyana, capping one of the most exciting comebacks in the history of 20 over cricket. He was later rewarded with the Play of the Match award for his million dollar 6, and a hefty cheque of $25,000.

In June 2021, he was selected to take part in the Minor League Cricket tournament in the United States following the players' draft.

== International career ==
He returned to the West Indies Test team for the Third Test against Australia at Perth on 16 December 2009 after both Shivnarine Chanderpaul and Adrian Barath were ruled out due to injury. Deonarine promptly claimed his best bowling in Tests with 2/72. He also made his first Test 50 and finished up with 82, his highest Test score.

On 15 November 2013, Narsingh claimed the wicket of Sachin Tendulkar, who was playing his final innings in his 200th Test match prior to retiring from all forms of cricket.

In January 2021, USA Cricket named Deonarine in a 44-man squad to begin training in Texas ahead of the 2021 Oman Tri-Nation Series.
