= West Indian cricket team in New Zealand in 2017–18 =

International cricket tour

	New Zealand	West Indies
- Dates: 25 November 2017 – 3 January 2018
Captains	Kane Williamson (Note: Kane Williamson was rested for final two ODIs, with Tom Latham named as captain for those matches. Tim Southee was captain for the first T20I with Williamson leading for final two matches)	Jason Holder (Tests & ODIs) (Note: Kraigg Brathwaite captained the side for the second Test after Holder was suspended for one match.); Carlos Brathwaite (T20Is)

Test series
- Result: New Zealand won the 2-match series 2–0
Most runs	Ross Taylor (216)	Kraigg Brathwaite (201)
Most wickets	Neil Wagner (14)	Miguel Cummins (7); Shannon Gabriel (7)

One Day International series
- Results: New Zealand won the 3-match series 3–0
Most runs	Ross Taylor (153)	Evin Lewis (86)
Most wickets	Trent Boult (10)	Sheldon Cottrell (5); Jason Holder (5)
- Player of the series: Trent Boult (NZ)

Twenty20 International series
- Results: New Zealand won the 3-match series 2–0
Most runs	Colin Munro (223)	Andre Fletcher (73)
Most wickets	Tim Southee (6)	Carlos Brathwaite (4)
- Player of the series: Colin Munro (NZ)

The West Indies cricket team toured New Zealand in December 2017 and January 2018 to play two Tests, three One Day Internationals (ODIs) and three Twenty20 International (T20I) matches. Three Tests were originally planned, but it was reduced to two by New Zealand Cricket (NZC) to conform to the expected tour make-up when the ICC World Test Championship is implemented. Ahead of the Test series, a three-day tour match was planned, which started on 25 November 2017.

New Zealand won the Test series 2–0 and the ODI series 3–0. New Zealand also won the T20I series 2–0, after the second match was washed out with no result possible. It was the first time since January 2000 that the West Indies failed to win a single match during a tour to New Zealand. With the 2–0 victory in the T20I series, New Zealand returned to the top of the ICC T20I Championship.

== Squads ==
Tests		ODIs		T20Is	
New Zealand	West Indies	New Zealand	West Indies	New Zealand	West Indies
Kane Williamson (c); Tom Blundell (wk); Trent Boult; Lockie Ferguson; Colin de Grandhomme; Matt Henry; Tom Latham; Henry Nicholls; Jeet Raval; Mitchell Santner; Tim Southee; Ross Taylor; Neil Wagner; BJ Watling (wk); George Worker	Jason Holder (c); Sunil Ambris; Devendra Bishoo; Jermaine Blackwood; Kraigg Brathwaite; Roston Chase; Miguel Cummins; Shane Dowrich (wk); Shannon Gabriel; Shimron Hetmyer; Shai Hope; Alzarri Joseph; Kieran Powell; Raymon Reifer; Kemar Roach	Kane Williamson (c); Todd Astle; Doug Bracewell; Neil Broom; Trent Boult; ~~Colin de Grandhomme~~; Lockie Ferguson; Matt Henry; Tom Latham (wk); Adam Milne; Colin Munro; Henry Nicholls; Seth Rance; Mitchell Santner; Tim Southee; Ross Taylor; George Worker	Jason Holder (c); ~~Sunil Ambris~~; Ronsford Beaton; Sheldon Cottrell; Shannon Gabriel; Chris Gayle; Shimron Hetmyer; Kyle Hope; Shai Hope (wk); ~~Alzarri Joseph~~; Evin Lewis; Nikita Miller; Jason Mohammed; Ashley Nurse; Rovman Powell; ~~Marlon Samuels~~; Chadwick Walton; Kesrick Williams	Kane Williamson (c); Trent Boult; Doug Bracewell; Tom Bruce; Lockie Ferguson; Martin Guptill; Matt Henry; Anaru Kitchen; Colin Munro; Glenn Phillips (wk); Seth Rance; Mitchell Santner; Ish Sodhi; Tim Southee; Ross Taylor	Carlos Brathwaite (c); Samuel Badree; ~~Ronsford Beaton~~; Sheldon Cottrell; Rayad Emrit; Andre Fletcher; Chris Gayle; Shimron Hetmyer; Shai Hope; Jason Mohammed; ~~Sunil Narine~~; Ashley Nurse; ~~Kieron Pollard~~; Rovman Powell; ~~Marlon Samuels~~; Jerome Taylor; Chadwick Walton (wk); Kesrick Williams

Ahead of the first Test, Tom Blundell and Lockie Ferguson were added to New Zealand's squad as cover for BJ Watling and Tim Southee respectively. George Worker was added to New Zealand's squad ahead of the first test after Tim Southee was ruled out due to a family reason. Southee returned for the second Test, following the birth of his child. The West Indies captain Jason Holder was suspended for the second Test, after maintaining a slow over-rate. Kraigg Brathwaite was named as the captain of the West Indies for the second Test in Holder's absence.

For New Zealand, Kane Williamson and Tim Southee were selected only for the first ODI with Neil Broom and Mitchell Santner replacing them for the last two ODIs. Tom Latham was named as captain for the last two ODIs. Sunil Ambris was ruled out of the West Indies' squad for the ODI series, after sustaining a fracture of the left forearm on the final day of the second Test. Colin de Grandhomme was ruled out of New Zealand's ODI squad due to a family reason and was replaced by Doug Bracewell.

Ahead of the limited-overs fixtures, Marlon Samuels, Sunil Narine and Alzarri Joseph were all ruled out of the West Indies' squad. Sheldon Cottrell and Chadwick Walton replaced Samuels and Joseph respectively in the ODI squad. Shimron Hetmyer was also named as Sunil Ambris' replacement for the ODIs following his injury in the second Test. Shai Hope replaced Samuels in the T20I squad, while Ashley Nurse replaced Narine.

Adam Milne injured his foot ahead of the second ODI and was replaced by Seth Rance in New Zealand's squad. Tim Southee was named as New Zealand's captain for the first T20I with Kane Williamson captaining the side for the last two matches. Ross Taylor was selected for the first T20I only while Trent Boult was selected for the third T20I only.

Prior to the T20I series, Kieron Pollard withdrew from the West Indies' squad for personal reasons and was replaced by Shimron Hetmyer. Ronsford Beaton was also unavailable for the West Indies due to an injury and was replaced by Sheldon Cottrell.

== Tour matches ==
=== Three-day match: New Zealand A vs West Indies ===
25–27 November 2017
Scorecard

West Indies	v	New Zealand A
451/9d (90 overs); Sunil Ambris 153 (145); Lockie Ferguson 5/67 (18 overs)		237 (61.4 overs); Todd Astle 68 (81); Roston Chase 2/7 (2.4 overs)
186 (53 overs); Kraigg Brathwaite 88 (124); Hamish Bennett 3/50 (11 overs)		72/0 (29 overs); Jeet Raval 32* (102)

Match drawn
Bert Sutcliffe Oval, Lincoln
Umpires: Shaun Haig (NZ) and Wayne Knights (NZ)

- West Indies won the toss and elected to bat.
- 15 players per side (11 batting, 11 fielding).

=== One-day match: New Zealand XI vs West Indies ===
16 December 2017
Scorecard

West Indies; 288 (48.4 overs)	v	New Zealand XI; 289/4 (48.3 overs)
Kyle Hope 94 (101); Aniket Parikh 4/47 (10 overs)		Jeet Raval 169 (150); Jason Holder 1/49 (7.5 overs)

New Zealand XI won by 6 wickets
Cobham Oval, Whangārei
Umpires: John Dempsey (NZ) and Derek Walker (NZ)

- West Indies won the toss and elected to bat.
- 12 players per side (11 batting, 11 fielding).

== Test series ==
=== 1st Test ===
1–5 December 2017 (Note: While five days of play were scheduled for each Test, both Tests reached the result within four days.)
Scorecard

West Indies	v	New Zealand
134 (45.4 overs); Kieran Powell 42 (79); Neil Wagner 7/39 (14.4 overs)		520/9d (127 overs); Tom Blundell 107* (180); Kemar Roach 3/85 (22 overs)
319 (106 overs); Kraigg Brathwaite 91 (221); Matt Henry 3/57 (24 overs)

New Zealand won by an innings and 67 runs
Basin Reserve, Wellington
Umpires: Ian Gould (Eng) and Rod Tucker (Aus)
Player of the match: Neil Wagner (NZ)

- New Zealand won the toss and elected to field.
- Tom Blundell (NZ) and Sunil Ambris (WI) both made their Test debuts.
- Sunil Ambris (WI) became the sixth batsman to be out hit wicket off the first ball, and the first to be dismissed in this manner on Test debut.
- Neil Wagner's figures of 7/39 were the fourth-best figures in Tests by a New Zealand bowler.
- Ross Taylor (NZ) scored his 10,000th run in first-class cricket and his 14,000th run in all formats of international cricket.
- Colin de Grandhomme scored his first century in Tests and the second-fastest century in Tests by a New Zealand batsman.
- Tom Blundell scored his first century in Tests and the highest Test score by a New Zealand wicket-keeper on debut.

=== 2nd Test ===
9–13 December 2017
Scorecard

New Zealand	v	West Indies
373 (102.2 overs); Jeet Raval 84 (157); Shannon Gabriel 4/119 (25 overs)		221 (66.5 overs); Kraigg Brathwaite 66 (116); Trent Boult 4/73 (20.5 overs)
291/8d (77.4 overs); Ross Taylor 107* (198); Miguel Cummins 3/69 (17 overs)		203 (63.5 overs); Roston Chase 64 (98); Neil Wagner 3/42 (15 overs)

New Zealand won by 240 runs
Seddon Park, Hamilton
Umpires: Bruce Oxenford (Aus) and Rod Tucker (Aus)
Player of the match: Ross Taylor (NZ)

- West Indies won the toss and elected to field.
- Kraigg Brathwaite became the 37th Test captain of West Indies.
- Raymon Reifer (WI) made his Test debut.
- Sunil Ambris (WI) became the first player to be dismissed hit-wicket twice in consecutive Tests.
- Ross Taylor equalled Martin Crowe and Kane Williamson's record for most centuries by a New Zealand batsman in Tests (17).
- Trent Boult (NZ) took his 200th wicket in Tests.

== ODI series ==
=== 1st ODI ===
20 December 2017
Scorecard

West Indies; 248/9 (50 overs)	v	New Zealand; 249/5 (46 overs)
Evin Lewis 76 (100); Doug Bracewell 4/55 (8 overs)		George Worker 57 (66); Jason Holder 2/52 (9 overs)

New Zealand won by 5 wickets
Cobham Oval, Whangārei
Umpires: Chris Brown (NZ) and Chettithody Shamshuddin (Ind)
Player of the match: Doug Bracewell (Nz)

- New Zealand won the toss and elected to field
- Todd Astle (NZ), Ronsford Beaton and Shimron Hetmyer (WI) all made their ODI debuts.

=== 2nd ODI ===
23 December 2017
Scorecard

New Zealand; 325/6 (50 overs)	v	West Indies; 121 (28 overs)
Henry Nicholls 83* (62); Sheldon Cottrell 3/62 (10 overs)		Ashley Nurse 27 (33); Trent Boult 7/34 (10 overs)

New Zealand won by 204 runs
Hagley Oval, Christchurch
Umpires: Wayne Knights (NZ) and Bruce Oxenford (Aus)
Player of the match: Trent Boult (NZ)

- West Indies won the toss and elected to field.
- Trent Boult became the 16th bowler for New Zealand to take 100 wickets in ODIs.
- This was New Zealand's biggest victory against the West Indies in terms of runs.

=== 3rd ODI ===
26 December 2017
Scorecard

New Zealand; 131/4 (23 overs)	v	West Indies; 99/9 (23 overs)
Ross Taylor 47* (54); Sheldon Cottrell 2/19 (6 overs)		Jason Holder 34 (21); Mitchell Santner 3/15 (5 overs)

New Zealand won by 66 runs (DLS method)
Hagley Oval, Christchurch
Umpires: Chris Brown (NZ) and Chettithody Shamshuddin (Ind)
Player of the match: Ross Taylor (NZ)

- New Zealand won the toss and elected to bat.
- Rain set the West Indies a revised target of 166 runs from 23 overs.

== T20I series ==
=== 1st T20I ===
29 December 2017
Scorecard

New Zealand; 187/7 (20 overs)	v	West Indies; 140 (19 overs)
Glenn Phillips 55 (40); Carlos Brathwaite 2/38 (4 overs)		Andre Fletcher 27 (25); Seth Rance 3/30 (4 overs)

New Zealand won by 47 runs
Saxton Oval, Nelson
Umpires: Chris Brown (NZ) and Wayne Knights (NZ)
Player of the match: Glenn Phillips (NZ)

- West Indies won the toss and elected to field.
- Anaru Kitchen, Seth Rance (NZ) and Shai Hope (WI) all made their T20I debuts.
- This venue hosted its first men's T20I.
- Tim Southee (NZ) made his T20I captaincy debut.

=== 2nd T20I ===
1 January 2018 (D/N)
Scorecard

New Zealand; 102/4 (9 overs)	v	West Indies
Colin Munro 66 (23); Ashley Nurse 1/13 (2 overs)

No result
Bay Oval, Mount Maunganui
Umpires: Chris Brown (NZ) and Shaun Haig (NZ)

- West Indies won the toss and elected to field.
- Rain during New Zealand's innings prevented any further play.
- Shimron Hetmyer (WI) made his T20I debut.

=== 3rd T20I ===
3 January 2018 (D/N)
Scorecard

New Zealand; 243/5 (20 overs)	v	West Indies; 124 (16.3 overs)
Colin Munro 104 (53); Carlos Brathwaite 2/50 (4 overs)		Andre Fletcher 46 (32); Tim Southee 3/21 (2.3 overs)

New Zealand won by 119 runs
Bay Oval, Mount Maunganui
Umpires: Shaun Haig (NZ) and Wayne Knights (NZ)
Player of the match: Colin Munro (NZ)

- New Zealand won the toss and elected to bat.
- Rayad Emrit (WI) made his T20I debut.
- Colin Munro (NZ) became the first player to score three centuries in T20Is. His century was the fastest by a New Zealand batsman in T20Is.
- This was New Zealand's highest score in T20Is.
- Shai Hope (WI) was unable to bat due to injury.
- This was New Zealand's largest victory by runs in T20Is and the third largest victory by runs by any team in T20Is.
