= Pakistani cricket team in the West Indies in 2016–17 =

International cricket tour

	West Indies	Pakistan
- Dates: 26 March – 14 May 2017
Captains	Jason Holder (Tests and ODIs); Carlos Brathwaite (T20Is)	Misbah-ul-Haq (Tests); Sarfaraz Ahmed (ODIs & T20Is)

Test series
- Result: Pakistan won the 3-match series 2–1
Most runs	Roston Chase (403)	Misbah-ul-Haq (271)
Most wickets	Shannon Gabriel (15)	Yasir Shah (25)
- Player of the series: Yasir Shah (Pak)

One Day International series
- Results: Pakistan won the 3-match series 2–1
Most runs	Jason Mohammed (154)	Mohammad Hafeez (201)
Most wickets	Ashley Nurse (6)	Hasan Ali (6)
- Player of the series: Shoaib Malik (Pak)

Twenty20 International series
- Results: Pakistan won the 4-match series 3–1
Most runs	Evin Lewis (111)	Babar Azam (137)
Most wickets	Carlos Brathwaite (5); Samuel Badree (5)	Shadab Khan (10)
- Player of the series: Shadab Khan (Pak)

The Pakistani national cricket team toured the West Indies from March 2017 to May 2017. The tour consisted of a series of three Test matches, three One Day Internationals (ODIs) and four Twenty20 internationals (T20Is). The West Indies Cricket Board (WICB) looked at the possibility of playing the T20I matches at the Central Broward Regional Park in Florida, as they did against India in August 2016. However, the WICB kept all the fixtures for this tour in the Caribbean.

In January 2017, the Pakistan Cricket Board (PCB) made an offer to the WICB to play two T20I matches in Pakistan. They would have been held in Lahore on 18 and 19 March 2017, with the teams playing two more T20Is in Lauderhill, Florida. However, when the tour fixtures were confirmed by the WICB on 12 January 2017, there was no mention of the matches in Pakistan. Later the same day the WICB confirmed that the West Indies would not play in Pakistan due to security concerns. Originally the tour was scheduled to contain two T20I matches, but early in March 2017, two extra T20I fixtures were added to the schedule.

Ahead of the tour, Misbah-ul-Haq confirmed he would continue as captain of the Pakistan Test side, a decision accepted by the PCB. In April 2017, Misbah announced that he would be retiring from international cricket at the end of the series. Two days later, Younis Khan also announced that he would retire from Test cricket following the conclusion of the series.

Pakistan won the T20I series 3–1, and the ODI series 2–1. They also won the Test series 2–1, their first Test series win in the West Indies.

== Squads ==
T20Is		ODIs		Tests	
West Indies	Pakistan	West Indies	Pakistan	West Indies	Pakistan
Carlos Brathwaite (c); Samuel Badree; Jonathan Carter; Andre Fletcher; Jason Holder; Evin Lewis; Jason Mohammed; Sunil Narine; Veerasammy Permaul; Kieron Pollard; Rovman Powell; Marlon Samuels; Lendl Simmons; Jerome Taylor; Chadwick Walton; Kesrick Williams	Sarfaraz Ahmed (c, wk); Hasan Ali; Kamran Akmal; Babar Azam; Mohammad Hafeez; Shadab Khan; Usman Khan; Shoaib Malik; Mohammad Nawaz; Rumman Raees; Wahab Riaz; Ahmed Shehzad; Sohail Tanvir; Imad Wasim; Fakhar Zaman	Jason Holder (c); Devendra Bishoo; Jonathan Carter; Miguel Cummins; Shannon Gabriel; Shai Hope; Alzarri Joseph; Evin Lewis; Jason Mohammed; Ashley Nurse; Veerasammy Permaul; Kieran Powell; Rovman Powell; Chadwick Walton	Sarfaraz Ahmed (c, wk); Kamran Akmal; Hasan Ali; Mohammad Amir; Mohammad Asghar; Faheem Ashraf; Babar Azam (vc); Mohammad Hafeez; Junaid Khan; Shadab Khan; Shoaib Malik; Wahab Riaz; Ahmed Shehzad; Imad Wasim; Asif Zakir; Fakhar Zaman	Jason Holder (c); Devendra Bishoo; Jermaine Blackwood; Kraigg Brathwaite; Roston Chase; Miguel Cummins; Shane Dowrich (wk); Shannon Gabriel; Shimron Hetmyer; Shai Hope; Alzarri Joseph; Kieran Powell; Vishaul Singh	Misbah-ul-Haq (c); Sarfaraz Ahmed (vc, wk); Mohammad Abbas; Azhar Ali; Hasan Ali; Mohammad Amir; Mohammad Asghar; Babar Azam; Shadab Khan; Younis Khan; Shan Masood; Wahab Riaz; Usman Salahuddin; Yasir Shah; Asad Shafiq; Ahmed Shehzad

Veerasammy Permaul was added to the West Indies ODI squad ahead of the third match as cover for Shannon Gabriel.

== First-class match: West Indies President's XI v Pakistan ==
15–17 April 2017
Scorecard

West Indies President's XI	v	Pakistan
419 (126.1 overs); Vishaul Singh 135 (234); Mohammad Amir 3/66 (22.1 overs)		192 (68 overs); Ahmed Shehzad 55 (151); Damion Jacobs 4/45 (16 overs)
152/2 (42 overs); Kieran Powell 84* (117); Mohammad Asghar 1/41 (13 overs)

Match drawn
Trelawny Stadium, Jamaica
Umpires: Gregory Brathwaite (WI) and Joel Wilson (WI)

- West Indies President's XI won the toss and elected to bat.

== T20I series ==
=== 1st T20I ===
26 March 2017
Scorecard

West Indies; 111/8 (20 overs)	v	Pakistan; 115/4 (17.1 overs)
Carlos Brathwaite 34* (27); Shadab Khan 3/7 (4 overs)		Shoaib Malik 38* (29); Jason Holder 2/23 (3 overs)

Pakistan won by 6 wickets
Kensington Oval, Bridgetown, Barbados
Umpires: Gregory Brathwaite (WI) and Joel Wilson (WI)
Player of the match: Shadab Khan (Pak)

- Pakistan won the toss and elected to field.
- Shadab Khan (Pak) and Rovman Powell (WI) both made their T20I debuts.
- Shadab Khan (Pak) recorded the most economical figures for a bowler completing their four overs on debut in a T20I.

=== 2nd T20I ===
30 March 2017
Scorecard

Pakistan; 132 (20 overs)	v	West Indies; 129/8 (20 overs)
Shoaib Malik 28 (20); Sunil Narine 3/22 (4 overs)		Marlon Samuels 44 (35); Shadab Khan 4/14 (4 overs)

Pakistan won by 3 runs
Queen's Park Oval, Port of Spain, Trinidad and Tobago
Umpires: Nigel Duguid (WI) and Joel Wilson (WI)
Player of the match: Shadab Khan (Pak)

- West Indies won the toss and elected to field.
- Fakhar Zaman (Pak) made his T20I debut.

=== 3rd T20I ===
1 April 2017
Scorecard

Pakistan; 137/8 (20 overs)	v	West Indies; 138/3 (14.5 overs)
Kamran Akmal 48 (37); Samuel Badree 2/22 (4 overs)		Evin Lewis 91 (51); Wahab Riaz 1/6 (2 overs)

West Indies won by 7 wickets
Queen's Park Oval, Port of Spain, Trinidad and Tobago
Umpires: Gregory Brathwaite (WI) and Leslie Reifer (WI)
Player of the match: Evin Lewis (WI)

- Pakistan won the toss and elected to bat.
- Jason Mohammed (WI) made his T20I debut.
- Evin Lewis (WI) made the highest score by any batsman against Pakistan in a T20I.

=== 4th T20I ===
2 April 2017
Scorecard

West Indies; 124/8 (20 overs)	v	Pakistan; 127/3 (19 overs)
Chadwick Walton 40 (31); Hasan Ali 2/12 (4 overs)		Ahmed Shehzad 53 (45); Kesrick Williams 2/16 (3 overs)

Pakistan won by 7 wickets
Queen's Park Oval, Port of Spain, Trinidad and Tobago
Umpires: Gregory Brathwaite (WI) and Joel Wilson (WI)
Player of the match: Hasan Ali (Pak)

- Pakistan won the toss and elected to field.

== ODI series ==
=== 1st ODI ===
7 April 2017
Scorecard

Pakistan; 308/5 (50 overs)	v	West Indies; 309/6 (49 overs)
Mohammad Hafeez 88 (92); Ashley Nurse 4/62 (10 overs)		Jason Mohammed 91* (58); Shadab Khan 2/52 (9 overs)

West Indies won by 4 wickets
Providence Stadium, Providence, Guyana
Umpires: Simon Fry (Aus) and Joel Wilson (WI)
Player of the match: Jason Mohammed (WI)

- West Indies won the toss and elected to field.
- Shadab Khan (Pak) made his ODI debut.
- This was the West Indies' highest successful run-chase in an ODI.

=== 2nd ODI ===
9 April 2017
Scorecard

Pakistan; 282/5 (50 overs)	v	West Indies; 208 (44.5 Overs)
Babar Azam 125* (132); Shannon Gabriel 2/50 (10 overs)		Jason Holder 68 (87); Hasan Ali 5/38 (8.5 overs)

Pakistan won by 74 runs
Providence Stadium, Providence, Guyana
Umpires: Gregory Brathwaite (WI) and Ian Gould (Eng)
Player of the match: Babar Azam (Pak)

- West Indies won the toss and elected to field.
- Babar Azam (Pak) scored the most runs after his first 25 innings in ODIs (1,306).

=== 3rd ODI ===
11 April 2017
Scorecard

West Indies; 233/9 (50 overs)	v	Pakistan; 236/4 (43.1 overs)
Shai Hope 71 (112); Mohammad Amir 2/41 (9 overs)		Shoaib Malik 101* (111); Shannon Gabriel 2/60 (10 overs)

Pakistan won by 6 wickets
Providence Stadium, Providence, Guyana
Umpires: Simon Fry (Aus) and Joel Wilson (WI)
Player of the match: Shoaib Malik (Pak)

- West Indies won the toss and elected to bat.

== Test series ==
=== 1st Test ===
21–25 April 2017
Scorecard

West Indies	v	Pakistan
286 (95 overs); Roston Chase 63 (151); Mohammad Amir 6/44 (26 overs)		407 (138.4 overs); Misbah-ul-Haq 99* (223); Alzarri Joseph 3/71 (31 overs)
152 (52.4 overs); Kieran Powell 49 (84); Yasir Shah 6/63 (21.4 overs)		36/3 (10.5 overs); Misbah-ul-Haq 12* (3); Alzarri Joseph 1/6 (3 overs)

Pakistan won by 7 wickets
Sabina Park, Kingston, Jamaica
Umpires: Richard Illingworth (Eng) and Richard Kettleborough (Eng)
Player of the match: Yasir Shah (Pak)

- Pakistan won the toss and elected to field.
- Only 11.3 overs of play was possible on day 2 due to a wet outfield and rain.
- Mohammad Abbas (Pak), Shimron Hetmyer and Vishaul Singh (WI) all made their Test debuts.
- Younis Khan (Pak) became the first batsman for Pakistan to score 10,000 runs in Tests and the oldest player to reach this milestone.
- Sarfaraz Ahmed and Misbah-ul-Haq (Pak) scored their 2,000th and 5,000th runs in Tests respectively.
- Misbah-ul-Haq became the sixth batsman and first for Pakistan to finish their innings on 99 not out.

=== 2nd Test ===
30 April–4 May 2017
Scorecard

West Indies	v	Pakistan
312 (98.5 overs); Roston Chase 131 (210); Mohammad Abbas 4/56 (23 overs)		393 (140 overs); Azhar Ali 105 (278); Shannon Gabriel 4/81 (32 overs)
268 (102.5 overs); Shai Hope 90 (209); Yasir Shah 7/94 (39.5 overs)		81 (34.4 overs); Sarfaraz Ahmed 23 (50); Shannon Gabriel 5/11 (11 overs)

West Indies won by 106 runs
Kensington Oval, Bridgetown, Barbados
Umpires: Richard Kettleborough (Eng) and Bruce Oxenford (Aus)
Player of the match: Shannon Gabriel (WI)

- West Indies won the toss and elected to bat.
- Shadab Khan (Pak) made his Test debut.
- Yasir Shah (Pak) took his 10th five-wicket haul in Tests.
- Pakistan's total of 81 was their lowest score against the West Indies in the West Indies.

=== 3rd Test ===
10–14 May 2017
Scorecard

Pakistan	v	West Indies
376 (146.3 overs); Azhar Ali 127 (334); Roston Chase 4/103 (32 overs)		247 (115 overs); Roston Chase 69 (155); Mohammad Abbas 5/46 (25 overs)
174/8d (57 overs); Yasir Shah 38* (55); Alzarri Joseph 3/53 (15 overs)		202 (96 overs); Roston Chase 101* (239); Yasir Shah 5/92 (37 overs)

Pakistan won by 101 runs
Windsor Park, Roseau, Dominica
Umpires: Richard Illingworth (Eng) and Bruce Oxenford (Aus)
Player of the match: Roston Chase (WI)

- West Indies won the toss and elected to field.
- 21 overs of play on day 1 were lost due to rain.
- Hasan Ali (Pak) made his Test debut.
- Misbah-ul-Haq and Younis Khan (Pak) both played their last international match.
- Mohammad Abbas (Pak) took his first five-wicket haul in Tests.
- This was Pakistan's first Test series win in the West Indies.
