= Bangladeshi cricket team in the West Indies and the United States in 2018 =

International cricket tour

Bangladesh against the West Indies in 2018
	West Indies	Bangladesh
- Dates: 28 June – 5 August 2018
Captains	Jason Holder (Tests and ODIs); Carlos Brathwaite (T20Is)	Shakib Al Hasan (Tests and T20Is); Mashrafe Mortaza (ODIs)

Test series
- Result: West Indies won the 2-match series 2–0
Most runs	Kraigg Brathwaite (239)	Shakib Al Hasan (98)
Most wickets	Jason Holder (16)	Mehedi Hasan (10)
- Player of the series: Jason Holder (WI)

One Day International series
- Results: Bangladesh won the 3-match series 2–1
Most runs	Shimron Hetmyer (207)	Tamim Iqbal (287)
Most wickets	Devendra Bishoo (4); Jason Holder (4)	Mashrafe Mortaza (7)
- Player of the series: Tamim Iqbal (Ban)

Twenty20 International series
- Results: Bangladesh won the 3-match series 2–1
Most runs	Andre Russell (99)	Shakib Al Hasan (103)
Most wickets	Keemo Paul (6)	Mustafizur Rahman (8)
- Player of the series: Shakib Al Hasan (Ban)

The Bangladesh cricket team toured the West Indies and the United States between June and August 2018 to play two Tests, three One Day Internationals (ODIs) and three Twenty20 International (T20I) matches. The final two T20I matches took place at the Central Broward Regional Park, in Lauderhill, Florida. The second Test took place in Jamaica, fourteen years after Bangladesh last played a Test there. Bangladesh last toured the West Indies in September 2014.

The tour was originally planned to take place in March 2018, but in August 2017 it was announced that the fixtures would be moved, most likely to July 2018, to accommodate the 2018 Cricket World Cup Qualifier. In May 2018, the Bangladesh Cricket Board (BCB) announced thirty-one member preliminary squad ahead of the tour.

The West Indies won the Test series 2–0. Bangladesh won the ODI series 2–1, their second ODI series win in the West Indies. Bangladesh won the T20I series 2–1. After the series, Bangladesh's coach Steve Rhodes said that he was proud of the team after coming back strong after the defeats in the Test series, and was surprised to win the T20I series.

== Squads ==
Tests		ODIs		T20Is	
West Indies	Bangladesh	West Indies	Bangladesh	West Indies	Bangladesh
Jason Holder (c); Devendra Bishoo; Kraigg Brathwaite; Roston Chase; Miguel Cummins; Shane Dowrich (wk); Shannon Gabriel; Shimron Hetmyer; Shai Hope; Alzarri Joseph; Keemo Paul; Kieran Powell; Kemar Roach; Devon Smith	Shakib Al Hasan (c); Litton Das (wk); Mominul Haque; Nurul Hasan (wk); Mehedi Hasan; Rubel Hossain; Tamim Iqbal; Shafiul Islam; Taijul Islam; Abu Jayed; Imrul Kayes; Mahmudullah; Kamrul Islam Rabbi; Mushfiqur Rahim (wk); Najmul Hossain Shanto	Jason Holder (c); Devendra Bishoo; Sheldon Cottrell; Chris Gayle; Shimron Hetmyer; Shai Hope (wk); Alzarri Joseph; Evin Lewis; Jason Mohammed; Ashley Nurse; Keemo Paul; Kieran Powell; Rovman Powell; Andre Russell	Mashrafe Mortaza (c); Shakib Al Hasan (vc); Litton Das (wk); Anamul Haque; Mehedi Hasan; Abu Hider; Mosaddek Hossain; Rubel Hossain; Tamim Iqbal; Nazmul Islam; Abu Jayed; Mahmudullah; Mustafizur Rahman; Sabbir Rahman; Mushfiqur Rahim (wk); Najmul Hossain Shanto	Carlos Brathwaite (c); Samuel Badree; Sheldon Cottrell; Andre Fletcher; Evin Lewis; Ashley Nurse; Keemo Paul; Rovman Powell; Denesh Ramdin (wk); Andre Russell; Marlon Samuels; Chadwick Walton; Kesrick Williams	Shakib Al Hasan (c); Litton Das (wk); Ariful Haque; Mehedi Hasan; Abu Hider; Mosaddek Hossain; Rubel Hossain; Tamim Iqbal; Nazmul Islam; Abu Jayed; Mahmudullah; Mushfiqur Rahim (wk); Mustafizur Rahman; Sabbir Rahman; Soumya Sarkar

Bangladesh also named Yeasin Arafat, Abu Hider, Nayeem Hasan, Mosaddek Hossain and Mustafizur Rahman as standby players ahead of the Test series. Before the second Test, Alzarri Joseph was added to the West Indies' squad, replacing Kemar Roach, who suffered an injury during the first Test. Sheldon Cottrell replaced the injured Andre Russell in the West Indies' squad for third ODI.

== Tour matches ==
=== Two-day match: West Indies President's XI vs Bangladesh ===
28–29 June 2018
Scorecard

Bangladesh	v	West Indies President's XI
403 (84.2 overs); Tamim Iqbal 125 (165); Alzarri Joseph 4/53 (15 overs)		310/8 (85 overs); Shimron Hetmyer 123 (138); Abu Jayed 2/39 (13 overs)

Match drawn
Stanford Cricket Ground, Antigua
Umpires: Carl Tuckett (WI) and Joel Wilson (WI)

- Bangladesh won the toss and elected to bat.

=== 50 over match: UWI Vice Chancellor's XI vs Bangladesh ===
19 July 2018
14:00 (D/N)
Scorecard

UWI Vice Chancellor's XI; 227/9 (50 overs)	v	Bangladesh; 230/6 (43.3 overs)
Yannick Ottley 58 (77); Mosaddek Hossain 4/14 (10 overs)		Mushfiqur Rahim 75* (70); Rovman Powell 2/32 (7 overs)

Bangladesh won by 4 wickets
Sabina Park, Kingston
Umpires: Patrick Gustard (WI) and Christopher Taylor (WI)

- UWI Vice Chancellor's XI won the toss and elected to bat.

== Test series ==
=== 1st Test ===
4–8 July 2018 (Note: While five days of play were scheduled for each Test, both Tests reached a result in three days.)
Scorecard

Bangladesh	v	West Indies
43 (18.4 overs); Litton Das 25 (53); Kemar Roach 5/8 (5 overs)		406 (137.3 overs); Kraigg Brathwaite 121 (291); Abu Jayed 3/84 (26.3 overs)
144 (40.2 overs); Nurul Hasan 64 (74); Shannon Gabriel 5/77 (12 overs)

West Indies won by an innings and 219 runs
Sir Vivian Richards Stadium, North Sound
Umpires: Richard Illingworth (Eng) and Richard Kettleborough (Eng)
Player of the match: Kemar Roach (WI)

- West Indies won the toss and elected to field.
- Abu Jayed (Ban) made his Test debut.
- Tamim Iqbal became the first Bangladesh player to score 4,000 runs in Tests.
- Bangladesh recorded their lowest team total in Tests.

=== 2nd Test ===
12–16 July 2018
Scorecard

West Indies	v	Bangladesh
354 (112 overs); Kraigg Brathwaite 110 (279); Mehedi Hasan 5/93 (29 overs)		149 (46.1 overs); Tamim Iqbal 47 (105); Jason Holder 5/44 (10.1 overs)
129 (45 overs); Roston Chase 32 (60); Shakib Al Hasan 6/33 (17 overs)		168 (42 overs); Shakib Al Hasan 54 (81); Jason Holder 6/59 (13 overs)

West Indies won by 166 runs
Sabina Park, Kingston
Umpires: Richard Illingworth (Eng) and Sundaram Ravi (Ind)
Player of the match: Jason Holder (WI)

- Bangladesh won the toss and elected to field.
- Keemo Paul (WI) made his Test debut.

== ODI Series ==
=== 1st ODI ===
22 July 2018
09:30
Scorecard

Bangladesh; 279/4 (50 overs)	v	West Indies; 231/9 (50 overs)
Tamim Iqbal 130* (160); Devendra Bishoo 2/52 (10 overs)		Shimron Hetmyer 52 (78); Mashrafe Mortaza 4/37 (10 overs)

Bangladesh won by 48 runs
Providence Stadium, Guyana
Umpires: Sundaram Ravi (Ind) and Joel Wilson (WI)
Player of the match: Tamim Iqbal (Ban)

- Bangladesh won the toss and elected to bat.
- Tamim Iqbal and Shakib Al Hasan's 207-run partnership was the highest for the second wicket in ODIs for Bangladesh and the highest for any wicket against the West Indies in ODIs.
- Tamim Iqbal scored his 10th century in ODIs.
- Bangladesh's total of 279/4 was their highest score against the West indies in the West Indies in ODIs.

=== 2nd ODI ===
25 July 2018
14:30 (D/N)
Scorecard

West Indies; 271 (49.3 ovrs)	v	Bangladesh; 268/6 (50 overs)
Shimron Hetmyer 125 (93); Rubel Hossain 3/61 (9 overs)		Mushfiqur Rahim 68 (67); Ashley Nurse 1/34 (10 overs)

West Indies won by 3 runs
Providence Stadium, Guyana
Umpires: Gregory Brathwaite (WI) and Richard Illingworth (Eng)
Player of the match: Shimron Hetmyer (WI)

- Bangladesh won the toss and elected to field.
- Shimron Hetmyer became the youngest batsman for the West Indies to score an ODI century in the West Indies.

=== 3rd ODI ===
28 July 2018
09:30
Scorecard

Bangladesh; 301/6 (50 overs)	v	West Indies; 283/6 (50 overs)
Tamim Iqbal 103 (124); Ashley Nurse 2/53 (10 overs)		Rovman Powell 74* (41); Mashrafe Mortaza 2/63 (10 overs)

Bangladesh won by 18 runs
Warner Park, Basseterre
Umpires: Sundaram Ravi (Ind) and Joel Wilson (WI)
Player of the match: Tamim Iqbal (Ban)

- Bangladesh won the toss and elected to bat.
- Tamim Iqbal (Ban) scored the most runs by a batsman in a three-match ODI series in the West Indies (287).
- Bangladesh's total of 301/6 was their highest score against the West indies in ODIs.

== T20I series ==
=== 1st T20I ===
31 July 2018
20:00 (N)
Scorecard

Bangladesh; 143/9 (20 overs)	v	West Indies; 93/3 (9.1 overs)
Mahmudullah 35 (27); Kesrick Williams 4/28 (4 overs)		Andre Russell 35* (21); Mustafizur Rahman 2/18 (2 overs)

West Indies won by 7 wickets (DLS method)
Warner Park, Basseterre
Umpires: Gregory Brathwaite (WI) and Joel Wilson (WI)
Player of the match: Andre Russell (WI)

- West Indies won the toss and elected to field.
- The West Indies were set a revised target of 91 runs in 11 overs due to rain.

=== 2nd T20I ===
4 August 2018
20:00 (N)
Scorecard

Bangladesh; 171/5 (20 overs)	v	West Indies; 159/9 (20 overs)
Tamim Iqbal 74 (44); Ashley Nurse 2/25 (4 overs)		Rovman Powell 43 (34); Nazmul Islam 3/28 (4 overs)

Bangladesh won by 12 runs
Central Broward Regional Park, Lauderhill, Florida
Umpires: Leslie Reifer (WI) and Joel Wilson (WI)
Player of the match: Tamim Iqbal (Ban)

- West Indies won the toss and elected to field.

=== 3rd T20I ===
5 August 2018
20:00 (N)
Scorecard

Bangladesh; 184/5 (20 overs)	v	West Indies; 135/7 (17.1 overs)
Litton Das 61 (32); Keemo Paul 2/26 (3 overs)		Andre Russell 47 (21); Mustafizur Rahman 3/31 (3.1 overs)

Bangladesh won by 19 runs (DLS method)
Central Broward Regional Park, Lauderhill, Florida
Umpires: Gregory Brathwaite (WI) and Nigel Duguid (WI)
Player of the match: Litton Das (Ban)

- Bangladesh won the toss and elected to bat.
- The West Indies were 19 runs behind the par score after rain interrupted play during their innings.
