= 2015–16 Regional Four Day Competition =

Cricket tournament

- Dates: 6 November 2015 – 18 March 2016
- Administrator(s): WICB
- Cricket format: First-class (four-day)
- Tournament format(s): Double round-robin
- Champions: Guyana (8th title)
- Participants: 6
- Matches: 30
- Most runs: (Guyana) Leon Johnson (807)
- Most wickets: (Jamaica) Nikita Miller (65)

The 2015–16 Regional Four Day Competition was the 50th edition of the Regional Four Day Competition, the domestic first-class cricket competition for the countries of the West Indies Cricket Board (WICB). The competition ran from 6 November 2015 to 18 March 2016.

Six teams contested the tournament – Barbados, Guyana, Jamaica, the Leeward Islands, Trinidad and Tobago, and the Windward Islands. Guyana were undefeated, winning eight of their ten matches and drawing the other two, and consequently won their eighth title (and second in a row). Jamaica's Nikita Miller was the leading wicket-taker, while Guyana's captain Leon Johnson led the competition in runs.

== Teams ==
Barbados	Guyana	Jamaica
19 players: Kraigg Brathwaite (c); Sulieman Benn; Tino Best; Kemar Brathwaite; Shamarh Brooks; Jonathan Carter; Roston Chase; Kyle Corbin; Miguel Cummins; Shane Dowrich; Justin Greaves; Shai Hope; Ashley Nurse; Omar Phillips; Mario Rampersaud; Kemar Roach; Kevin Stoute; Hayden Walsh; Jomel Warrican	16 players: Leon Johnson (c); Christopher Barnwell; Ronsford Beaton; Devendra Bishoo; Anthony Bramble; Shivnarine Chanderpaul; Tagenarine Chanderpaul; Rajindra Chandrika; Assad Fudadin; Shimron Hetmyer; Steven Jacobs; Keon Joseph; Gudakesh Motie; Veerasammy Permaul; Raymon Reifer; Vishaul Singh	22 players: Paul Palmer (c); Carlton Baugh; David Bernard; Jermaine Blackwood; Gavon Brown; Dennis Bulli; John Campbell; Sheldon Cottrell; Jason Dawes; Kirk Edwards; Nicholson Gordon; Damion Jacobs; Brandon King; Tamar Lambert; Andre McCarthy; Nikita Miller; Marquino Mindley; Rovman Powell; Aldane Thomas; Devon Thomas; Shacaya Thomas; Chadwick Walton
Leeward Islands	Trinidad and Tobago	Windward Islands
20 players: Steve Liburd (c); Quinton Boatswain; Nelson Bolan; Nkruma Bonner; Keacy Carty; Rahkeem Cornwall; Daron Cruickshank; Colin Hamer; Jahmar Hamilton; Montcin Hodge; Chesney Hughes; Shane Jeffers; Alzarri Joseph; Jeremiah Louis; Jaison Peters; Orlando Peters; Sherwin Peters; Kieran Powell; Jacques Taylor; Gavin Tonge	21 players: Rayad Emrit (c); Darren Bravo; Yannic Cariah; Narsingh Deonarine; Shannon Gabriel; Justin Guillen; Kyle Hope; Akeal Hosein; Jon-Russ Jaggesar; Kavesh Kantasingh; Steven Katwaroo; Imran Khan; Evin Lewis; Jason Mohammed; Uthman Muhammad; Ewart Nicholson; Kjorn Ottley; Yannick Ottley; Marlon Richards; Daniel St Clair; Jeremy Solozano	21 players: Liam Sebastien (c); Sunil Ambris; Miles Bascombe; Alston Bobb; Johnson Charles; Keron Cottoy; Larry Edwards; Andre Fletcher; Kavem Hodge; Delorn Johnson; Keddy Lesporis; Mervin Matthew; Kyle Mayers; Kevin McClean; Kenroy Peters; Dalton Polius; Gidron Pope; Jerlani Robinson; Shane Shillingford; Devon Smith; Tyrone Theophile

== Points table ==
Team	Pld	W	L	D	T	BP	P
Guyana	10	8	0	2	0	47	149
Barbados	10	7	1	2	0	52	142
Jamaica	10	4	6	0	0	37	85
Trinidad and Tobago	10	3	5	2	0	39	81
Windward Islands	10	2	6	2	0	34	64
Leeward Islands	10	1	7	2	0	32	50
Source: ESPNcricinfo

== Fixtures ==
6–9 November 2015
Scorecard

Barbados	v	Jamaica
373 (139.3 overs)		189 (71.4 overs)
4/0 (3 overs)		187 (64.4 overs)

Barbados won by 10 wickets
Kensington Oval, Bridgetown
Player of the match: Kraigg Brathwaite (Bar)

6–9 November 2015
Scorecard

Guyana	v	Windward Islands
362 (129.4 overs)		228 (89.4 overs)
95 (48.1 overs)		125 (46.1 overs)

Guyana won by 104 runs
Guyana National Stadium, Providence
Player of the match: Rajindra Chandrika (Guy)

- Gudakesh Motie (Guy) and Kyle Mayers (Win) made their first-class debuts.

6–8 November 2015
Scorecard

Trinidad and Tobago	v	Leeward Islands
325 (123 overs)		118 (39 overs)
		184 (55.4 overs)

Trinidad and Tobago won by an innings and 23 runs
Warner Park, Basseterre
Player of the match: Kavesh Kantasingh (Tri)

13–16 November 2015
Scorecard

Barbados	v	Trinidad and Tobago
300 (117.3 overs)		246 (97.2 overs)
243/5 dec. (64 overs)		182/4 (68 overs)

Match drawn
Kensington Oval, Bridgetown
Player of the match: Shamarh Brooks (Bar)

13–16 November 2015
Scorecard

Guyana	v	Leeward Islands
419/9 dec. (150.1 overs)		85 (47.2 overs)
		299 (109.5 overs)

Guyana won by an innings and 35 runs
Guyana National Stadium, Providence
Player of the match: Vishaul Singh (Guy)

13–15 November 2015
Scorecard

Jamaica	v	Windward Islands
259 (108 overs)		212 (70.2 overs)
129 (49 overs)		145 (43 overs)

Jamaica won by 30 runs
Sabina Park, Kingston
Player of the match: Nikita Miller (Jam)

20–23 November 2015
Scorecard

Guyana	v	Barbados
337 (118.4 overs)		104 (50 overs)
43/1 (7.4 overs)		272 (138.1 overs)

Guyana won by 9 wickets
Kensington Oval, Bridgetown
Player of the match: Gudakesh Motie (Guy)

- Kemar Brathwaite (Bar) and Mario Rampersaud (Guy) made their first-class debuts.

20–23 November 2015
Scorecard

Trinidad and Tobago	v	Jamaica
271 (120.2 overs)		291 (101 overs)
175 (69.5 overs)		156/4 (48.3 overs)

Jamaica won by 6 wickets
Queen's Park Oval, Port of Spain
Player of the match: John Campbell (Jam)

20–21 November 2015
Scorecard

Leeward Islands	v	Windward Islands
24/7 dec. (18.3 overs)		140 (34.4 overs)
170 (64.4 overs)		56/2 (10.2 overs)

Windward Islands won by 8 wickets
Windsor Park, Roseau
Player of the match: Tyrone Theophile (Win)

4–7 December 2015
Scorecard

Barbados	v	Windward Islands
296 (126.3 overs)		179 (48.3 overs)
261/7 (88 overs)		197 (70.2 overs)

Barbados won by 181 runs
Guyana National Stadium, Providence
Player of the match: Sulieman Benn (Bar)

4–6 December 2015
Scorecard

Leeward Islands	v	Jamaica
164 (63 overs)		243 (84.1 overs)
228 (91.5 overs)		150/7 (40.5 overs)

Jamaica won by 3 wickets
Sabina Park, Kingston
Player of the match: Nikita Miller (Jam)

4–7 December 2015
Scorecard

Trinidad and Tobago	v	Guyana
210 (74.2 overs)		475 (165.1 overs)
216 (77.4 overs)

Guyana won by an innings and 49 runs
Queen's Park Oval, Port of Spain
Player of the match: Christopher Barnwell (Guy)

- Uthman Muhammad (Tri) made his first-class debut.

11–13 December 2015
Scorecard

Barbados	v	Leeward Islands
368 (109.2 overs)		170 (70 overs)
1/0 (0.2 overs)		198 (72 overs)

Barbados won by 10 wickets
Kensington Oval, Bridgetown
Player of the match: Roston Chase (Bar)

11–14 December 2015
Scorecard

Guyana	v	Jamaica
189 (71 overs)		146 (67.5 overs)
282 (99 overs)		208 (100.3 overs)

Guyana won by 117 runs
Sabina Park, Kingston
Player of the match: Gudakesh Motie (Guy)

- Rovman Powell (Jam) made his first-class debut.

11–14 December 2015
Scorecard

Windward Islands	v	Trinidad and Tobago
306 (129.3 overs)		382 (141.1 overs)
198/8 (81.4 overs)

Match drawn
Beausejour Stadium, Gros Islet
Player of the match: Yannick Ottley (Tri)

11–14 February 2016
Scorecard

Leeward Islands	v	Jamaica
155 (87.1 overs)		158 (55 overs)
368/8 dec. (130 overs)		280 (75.3 overs)

Leeward Islands won by 85 runs
Sir Vivian Richards Stadium, North Sound
Player of the match: Rahkeem Cornwall (Lee)

12–15 February 2016
Scorecard

Windward Islands	v	Barbados
250 (95.1 overs)		450/5 dec. (131 overs
144 (53.3 overs)

Barbados won by an innings and 56 runs
Kensington Oval, Bridgetown
Player of the match: Miguel Cummins (Bar)

12–15 February 2016
Scorecard

Guyana	v	Trinidad and Tobago
237 (90.4 overs)		179 (70.3 overs)
244/4 dec. (69 overs)		197 (69 overs)

Guyana won by 105 runs
Guyana National Stadium, Providence
Player of the match: Vishaul Singh (Guy)

- Jon-Russ Jaggesar (Tri) made his first-class debut.

19–22 February 2016
Scorecard

Barbados	v	Guyana
274 (88.3 overs)		190 (61.5 overs)
320/4 dec. (93.2 overs)		252/7 (117 overs)

Match drawn
Kensington Oval, Bridgetown
Player of the match: Roston Chase (Bar)

19–22 February 2016
Scorecard

Jamaica	v	Trinidad and Tobago
225 (101.3 overs)		206 (70 overs)
155 (68.2 overs)		178/2 (56 overs)

Trinidad and Tobago won by 8 wickets
Sabina Park, Kingston
Player of the match: Evin Lewis (Tri)

19–22 February 2016
Scorecard

Leeward Islands	v	Windward Islands
327 (106.4 overs)		389 (129.3 overs)
171/8 (58 overs)

Match drawn
Addelita Cancryn JHS, Charlotte Amalie
Player of the match: Kyle Mayers (Win)

26–28 February 2016
Scorecard

Jamaica	v	Barbados
177 (52.3 overs)		217 (83.3 overs)
157 (49.2 overs)		118/4 (31.2 overs)

Barbados won by 6 wickets
Sabina Park, Kingston

26–29 February 2016
Scorecard

Leeward Islands	v	Trinidad and Tobago
225 (73 overs)		406 (126.5 overs)
287 (94.3 overs)		111/1 (13.3 overs)

Trinidad and Tobago won by 9 wickets
National Cricket Centre, Couva
Player of the match: Imran Khan (Tri)

- Keacy Carty (Lee) made his first-class debut.

26–28 February 2016
Scorecard

Windward Islands	v	Guyana
216 (68.2 overs)		339 (112.5 overs)
161 (56 overs)		39/4 (11.4 overs)

Guyana won by 6 wickets
Beausejour Stadium, Gros Islet
Player of the match: Leon Johnson (Guy)

11–14 March 2015
Scorecard

Leeward Islands	v	Guyana
430 (149 overs)		190 (80.1 overs)
		222/8 (109.5 overs)

Match drawn
Sir Vivian Richards Stadium, North Sound
Player of the match: Montcin Hodge (Lee)

11–14 March 2015
Scorecard

Barbados	v	Trinidad and Tobago
396 (142.4 overs)		226 (85.2 overs)
74/3 (23.5 overs)		240 (81.2 overs)

Barbados won by 7 wickets
National Cricket Centre, Couva
Player of the match: Kraigg Brathwaite (Bar)

11–14 March 2015
Scorecard

Jamaica	v	Windward Islands
445 (134.4 overs)		233 (71.2 overs)
143/1 (34.4 overs)		350 (143.1 overs)

Jamaica won by 9 wickets
Arnos Vale Stadium, Kingstown
Player of the match: John Campbell (Jam)

- Gidron Pope (Win) and Aldane Thomas (Jam) made their first-class debuts.

18–20 March 2015
Scorecard

Guyana	v	Jamaica
420 (127 overs)		231 (91.3 overs)
		134 (50 overs)

Guyana won by an innings and 55 runs
Guyana National Stadium, Providence
Player of the match: Shimron Hetmyer (Guy)

- Dennis Bulli (Jam) made his first-class debut.

18–20 March 2015
Scorecard

Leeward Islands	v	Barbados
119 (51.2 overs)		436 (122.3 overs)
224 (75.4 overs)

Barbados won by an innings and 93 runs
Warner Park, Basseterre
Player of the match: Jomel Warrican (Bar)

18–21 March 2015
Scorecard

Trinidad and Tobago	v	Windward Islands
211 (78.1 overs)		289 (86 overs)
243 (97.4 overs)		169/3 (41.1 overs)

Windward Islands won by 7 wickets
National Cricket Centre, Couva
Player of the match: Tyrone Theophile (Win)

- Larry Edwards (Win) and Ewart Nicholson (Tri) made their first-class debuts.

== Statistics ==
=== Most runs ===
The top five run-scorers are included in this table, listed by runs scored and then by batting average.

Player	Team	Runs	Inns	Avg	Highest	100s	50s
Leon Johnson	Guyana	807	17	57.64	111*	2	5
Devon Smith	Windward Islands	716	15	47.93	127	2	6
Vishaul Singh	Guyana	712	16	50.85	150	3	1
Roston Chase	Barbados	710	16	59.16	136*	1	6
Kraigg Brathwaite	Barbados	676	12	61.45	123	3	2

=== Most wickets ===
The top five wicket-takers are listed in this table, listed by wickets taken and then by bowling average.

Player	Team	Overs	Wkts	Ave	5	10	BBI
Nikita Miller	Jamaica	546.3	65	16.87	4	1	8/67
Rahkeem Cornwall	Leeward Islands	432.2	48	22.60	5	1	7/131
Imran Khan	Trinidad and Tobago	405.1	44	28.11	1	0	7/90
Gudakesh Motie	Guyana	251.0	40	13.50	4	1	6/20
Veerasammy Permaul	Guyana	351.4	40	18.77	4	0	5/25
