= West Indian cricket team in Ireland in 2017 =

	Ireland	West Indies
- Date: 13 September 2017
Captains	William Porterfield	Jason Holder

One Day International series

The West Indies cricket team toured Ireland in September 2017 to play a One Day International (ODI) match. It was Ireland's first scheduled ODI match since they became a Full Member side in June 2017. The teams last faced each other when they met in the group stage of the 2015 Cricket World Cup. However, the match was called-off without a ball bowled due to rain and a wet outfield. As a result, the West Indies needed to remain undefeated when they played five ODIs against England later in September to avoid the 2018 Cricket World Cup Qualifier; they were unsuccessful, and therefore failed to directly qualify for the 2019 Cricket World Cup.

== Squads ==
ODIs
Ireland	West Indies
William Porterfield (c); John Anderson; Andrew Balbirnie; Peter Chase; George Dockrell; Ed Joyce; Jacob Mulder; Tim Murtagh; Kevin O'Brien; Niall O'Brien; Boyd Rankin; Simi Singh; Paul Stirling; Gary Wilson	Jason Holder (c); Sunil Ambris; Devendra Bishoo; Miguel Cummins; Chris Gayle; Kyle Hope; Shai Hope; Alzarri Joseph; Evin Lewis; Jason Mohammed; Ashley Nurse; Rovman Powell; Marlon Samuels; Jerome Taylor; Kesrick Williams

== ODI series ==
=== Only ODI ===
13 September 2017
Scorecard

Ireland	v	West Indies

Match abandoned
Stormont Cricket Ground, Belfast
Umpires: Michael Gough (Eng) and Mark Hawthorne (Ire)

- No toss.
- No play was possible due to rain and a wet outfield.
