= 2013 Caribbean Premier League squads =

This is a list of the squads of the teams that participated in the 2013 Caribbean Premier League.

== Antigua Hawksbills ==
| No. | Player | Nat | Date of birth | Batting | Bowling style |
|---|---|---|---|---|---|
| | Marlon Samuels (c) | (Jamaica) | 5 February 1981 (aged 32) | Right | Right-arm off break |
| | Johnson Charles (wk) | (Saint Lucia) | 14 January 1989 (aged 24) | Right |
| | Rahkeem Cornwall | (Antigua and Barbuda) | 1 February 1993 (aged 20) | Right | Right-arm off break |
| | Sheldon Cottrell | (Jamaica) | 19 August 1989 (aged 23) | Right | Left-arm fast-medium |
| | Jahmar Hamilton (wk) | (Anguilla) | 22 September 1990 (aged 22) | Right |
| | Montcin Hodge | (Anguilla) | 29 September 1987 (aged 25) | Right | Right-arm off break |
| | Anthony Martin | (Antigua and Barbuda) | 18 November 1982 (aged 30) | Right | Leg break |
| | Dave Mohammed | (Trinidad and Tobago) | 8 October 1979 (aged 33) | Left | Slow left-arm wrist-spin |
| | Orlando Peters | (Antigua and Barbuda) | 10 May 1988 (aged 25) | Right | Right-arm medium |
| | Ricky Ponting | (Australia) | 19 December 1974 (aged 38) | Right | Right-arm medium |
| | Kieran Powell | (Saint Kitts) | 6 March 1990 (aged 23) | Left | Right-arm medium |
| | Kemar Roach | (Barbados) | 30 June 1988 (aged 25) | Right | Right-arm fast |
| | Ben Rohrer | (Australia) | 26 March 1981 (aged 32) | Left |
| | Devon Thomas (wk) | (Antigua and Barbuda) | 12 November 1989 (aged 23) | Right | Right-arm medium |
| | Gavin Tonge | (Antigua and Barbuda) | 13 January 1983 (aged 30) | Right | Right-arm fast-medium |

Justin Kemp (injured), Steven Smith (injured)

== Barbados Tridents ==
| No. | Player | Nat | Date of birth | Batting | Bowling style |
|---|---|---|---|---|---|
| | Kieron Pollard (c) | (Trinidad and Tobago) | 12 May 1987 (aged 26) | Right | Right-arm medium |
| | Azhar Mahmood | (England) | 28 February 1975 (aged 38) | Right | Right-arm fast-medium |
| | Devendra Bishoo | (Guyana) | 1 February 1993 (aged 20) | Left | Leg break |
| | Carlos Brathwaite | (Barbados) | 18 July 1988 (aged 25) | Right | Right-arm fast-medium |
| | Jonathan Carter | (Barbados) | 16 November 1987 (aged 25) | Left | Right-arm medium |
| | Kirk Edwards | (Barbados) | 3 November 1984 (aged 28) | Right | Right-arm off break |
| | Rayad Emrit | (Trinidad and Tobago) | 8 March 1981 (aged 32) | Right | Right-arm medium-fast |
| | Shannon Gabriel | (Trinidad and Tobago) | 28 April 1988 (aged 25) | Right | Right-arm fast-medium |
| | Jason Holder | (Barbados) | 5 November 1991 (aged 21) | Right | Right-arm medium-fast |
| | Kyle Mayers | (Barbados) | 8 September 1992 (aged 20) | Left | Right-arm medium |
| | Ashley Nurse | (Barbados) | 22 December 1988 (aged 24) | Right | Right-arm off break |
| | Raymon Reifer | (Barbados) | 11 May 1991 (aged 22) | Left | Left-arm medium-fast |
| | Shakib Al Hasan | (Bangladesh) | 24 March 1987 (aged 26) | Left | Slow left-arm orthodox |
| | Shoaib Malik | (Pakistan) | 1 February 1982 (aged 31) | Right | Right-arm off break |
| | Dwayne Smith | (Barbados) | 12 April 1983 (aged 30) | Right | Right-arm medium |

== Guyana Amazon Warriors ==
| No. | Player | Nat | Date of birth | Batting | Bowling style |
|---|---|---|---|---|---|
| | Ramnaresh Sarwan (c) | (Guyana) | 23 June 1980 (aged 33) | Right | Leg break |
| | Christopher Barnwell | (Guyana) | 6 January 1987 (aged 26) | Right | Right-arm medium-fast |
| | Narsingh Deonarine | (Guyana) | 16 August 1983 (aged 29) | Left | Right-arm off break |
| | Tillakaratne Dilshan | (Sri Lanka) | 14 October 1976 (aged 36) | Right | Right-arm off break |
| | James Franklin | (New Zealand) | 7 November 1980 (aged 32) | Left | Left-arm medium |
| | Trevon Griffith | (Guyana) | 18 April 1991 (aged 22) | Left | Right-arm off break |
| | Steven Jacobs | (Guyana) | 13 September 1988 (aged 24) | Right | Right-arm off break |
| | Mohammad Hafeez | (Pakistan) | 17 October 1980 (aged 32) | Right | Right-arm off break |
| | Keon Joseph | (Guyana) | 25 November 1991 (aged 21) | Right | Right-arm fast-medium |
| | Lasith Malinga | (Sri Lanka) | 28 August 1983 (aged 29) | Right | Right-arm fast |
| | Sunil Narine | (Trinidad and Tobago) | 26 May 1988 (aged 25) | Right | Right-arm off break |
| | William Perkins (wk) | (Trinidad and Tobago) | 8 October 1986 (aged 26) | Right |
| | Veerasammy Permaul | (Guyana) | 11 August 1989 (aged 23) | Right | Slow left-arm orthodox |
| | Denesh Ramdin (wk) | (Trinidad and Tobago) | 13 March 1985 (aged 28) | Right |
| | Krishmar Santokie | (Jamaica) | 20 December 1984 (aged 28) | Left | Left-arm medium-fast |
| | Lendl Simmons | (Trinidad and Tobago) | 25 January 1985 (aged 28) | Right | Right-arm medium |

== Jamaica Tallawahs ==
| No. | Player | Nat | Date of birth | Batting | Bowling style |
|---|---|---|---|---|---|
| | Chris Gayle (c) | (Jamaica) | 21 September 1979 (aged 33) | Left | Right-arm off break |
| | Carlton Baugh (wk) | (Jamaica) | 23 June 1982 (aged 31) | Right |
| | David Bernard | (Jamaica) | 19 July 1981 (aged 32) | Right | Right-arm medium-fast |
| | Jermaine Blackwood | (Jamaica) | 20 November 1991 (aged 21) | Right | Right-arm off break |
| | Nkrumah Bonner | (Jamaica) | 23 January 1989 (aged 24) | Right | Leg break |
| | Akeem Dewar | (Jamaica) | 30 August 1991 (aged 21) | Right | Leg break |
| | Danza Hyatt | (Jamaica) | 17 March 1983 (aged 30) | Right | Right-arm medium |
| | Nikita Miller | (Jamaica) | 16 May 1982 (aged 31) | Right | Slow left-arm orthodox |
| | Muttiah Muralitharan | (Sri Lanka) | 17 April 1972 (aged 41) | Right | Right-arm off break |
| | Vernon Philander | (South Africa) | 24 June 1985 (aged 28) | Right | Right-arm fast-medium |
| | Andrew Richardson | (Jamaica) | 6 September 1981 (aged 31) | Left | Right-arm fast-medium |
| | Jacques Rudolph | (South Africa) | 4 May 1981 (aged 32) | Left | Leg break |
| | Andre Russell | (Jamaica) | 29 April 1988 (aged 25) | Right | Right-arm fast |
| | Kumar Sangakkara (wk) | (Sri Lanka) | 27 October 1977 (aged 35) | Left |
| | Chadwick Walton (wk) | (Jamaica) | 3 July 1985 (aged 28) | Right |

== St Lucia Zouks ==
| No. | Player | Nat | Date of birth | Batting | Bowling style |
|---|---|---|---|---|---|
| | Darren Sammy (c) | (Saint Lucia) | 20 December 1983 (aged 29) | Right | Right-arm medium-fast |
| | Tino Best | (Barbados) | 26 August 1981 (aged 31) | Right | Right-arm fast |
| | Andre Fletcher (wk) | (Grenada) | 28 November 1987 (aged 25) | Right |
| | Herschelle Gibbs | (South Africa) | 23 February 1974 (aged 39) | Right |
| | Kavem Hodge | (Dominica) | 21 February 1993 (aged 20) | Right | Slow left-arm orthodox |
| | Garey Mathurin | (Saint Lucia) | 23 September 1983 (aged 29) | Left | Slow left-arm orthodox |
| | Misbah-ul-Haq | (Pakistan) | 28 May 1974 (aged 39) | Right | Leg break |
| | Albie Morkel | (South Africa) | 10 June 1981 (aged 32) | Left | Right-arm medium-fast |
| | Nelon Pascal | (Grenada) | 25 April 1987 (aged 26) | Right | Right-arm fast |
| | Kenroy Peters | (Saint Vincent and the Grenadines) | 24 February 1982 (aged 31) | Right | Left-arm medium |
| | Dalton Polius | (Saint Lucia) | 12 September 1990 (aged 22) | Left | Right-arm off break |
| | Liam Sebastien | (Dominica) | 9 September 1984 (aged 28) | Left | Right-arm off break |
| | Shane Shillingford | (Dominica) | 22 February 1983 (aged 30) | Right | Right-arm off break |
| | Devon Smith | (Grenada) | 21 October 1981 (aged 31) | Left | Right-arm off break |
| | Tamim Iqbal | (Bangladesh) | 20 March 1989 (aged 24) | Left |

== Trinidad and Tobago Red Steel ==
| No. | Player | Nat | Date of birth | Batting | Bowling style |
|---|---|---|---|---|---|
| | Dwayne Bravo (c) | (Trinidad and Tobago) | 7 October 1983 (aged 29) | Right | Right-arm medium-fast |
| | Samuel Badree | (Trinidad and Tobago) | 9 March 1981 (aged 32) | Right | Leg break |
| | Adrian Barath | (Trinidad and Tobago) | 14 April 1990 (aged 23) | Right | Right-arm off break |
| | Sulieman Benn | (Barbados) | 22 July 1981 (aged 32) | Left | Slow left-arm orthodox |
| | Darren Bravo | (Trinidad and Tobago) | 6 February 1989 (aged 24) | Left | Right-arm medium-fast |
| | Yannick Cariah | (Trinidad and Tobago) | 22 June 1992 (aged 21) | Left | Leg break |
| | Kevon Cooper | (Trinidad and Tobago) | 16 February 1989 (aged 23) | Right | Right-arm medium |
| | Miguel Cummins | (Barbados) | 5 September 1990 (aged 22) | Left | Right-arm fast |
| | Fidel Edwards | (Barbados) | 6 February 1982 (aged 31) | Right | Right-arm fast |
| | Justin Guillen | (Trinidad and Tobago) | 2 January 1986 (aged 27) | Left | Right-arm off break |
| | Mahela Jayawardene | (Sri Lanka) | 27 May 1977 (aged 35) | Right | Right-arm medium |
| | Delorn Johnson | (Saint Vincent and the Grenadines) | 15 September 1988 (aged 24) | Left | Left-arm fast |
| | Kevin O'Brien | (Republic of Ireland) | 4 March 1984 (aged 29) | Right | Right-arm medium-fast |
| | Nicholas Pooran (wk) | (Trinidad and Tobago) | 2 October 1995 (aged 17) | Left |
| | Ross Taylor | (New Zealand) | 8 March 1984 (aged 29) | Right | Right-arm off break |
