= English cricket team in the West Indies in 2024–25 =

International cricket tour

	West Indies	England
- Dates: 31 October – 17 November 2024
Captains	Shai Hope (ODIs); Rovman Powell (T20Is)	Liam Livingstone (ODIs); Jos Buttler (T20Is)

One Day International series
- Results: West Indies won the 3-match series 2–1
Most runs	Keacy Carty (218)	Liam Livingstone (178)
Most wickets	Matthew Forde (8)	Adil Rashid (3)
- Player of the series: Matthew Forde (WI)

Twenty20 International series
- Results: England won the 5-match series 3–1
Most runs	Rovman Powell (153)	Phil Salt (162)
Most wickets	Akeal Hosein (5)	Saqib Mahmood (9)
- Player of the series: Saqib Mahmood (Eng)

The England cricket team toured the West Indies in October and November 2024 to play the West Indies cricket team. The tour consisted of three One Day International (ODI) and five Twenty20 International (T20I) matches. In May 2024, the Cricket West Indies (CWI) had confirmed the fixtures for the tour, as a part of the 2024–25 home international season.

== Squads ==
West Indies		England	
ODIs	T20Is	ODIs	T20Is
Shai Hope (c, wk); Jewel Andrew (wk); Keacy Carty; Roston Chase; Matthew Forde; Shimron Hetmyer; Alzarri Joseph; Shamar Joseph; Brandon King; Evin Lewis; Gudakesh Motie; Sherfane Rutherford; Jayden Seales; Romario Shepherd; Hayden Walsh Jr.	Rovman Powell (c); Roston Chase; Matthew Forde (Note: In squad for first, second and third T20I only.); Shimron Hetmyer; Terrance Hinds; Shai Hope (wk); Akeal Hosein; Alzarri Joseph (Note: In squad for third, fourth and fifth T20I only.); Shamar Joseph (Note: In squad for first and second T20I only.); Brandon King; Evin Lewis; Obed McCoy (Note: In squad for fourth and fifth T20I only.); Gudakesh Motie; Nicholas Pooran (wk); Andre Russell; Sherfane Rutherford; Romario Shepherd; Shamar Springer	Liam Livingstone (c); ~~Jos Buttler (c, wk)~~; Rehan Ahmed; Jofra Archer; Jacob Bethell; Jafer Chohan; Sam Curran; Jordan Cox; Will Jacks; Saqib Mahmood; Dan Mousley; Jamie Overton; Michael Pepper (wk); Adil Rashid; Phil Salt (wk); Reece Topley; John Turner	Jos Buttler (c, wk); Rehan Ahmed; Jofra Archer; Jacob Bethell; ~~Jafer Chohan~~; Sam Curran; Jordan Cox; Will Jacks; Liam Livingstone; Saqib Mahmood; Dan Mousley; Jamie Overton; Michael Pepper (wk); Adil Rashid; Phil Salt (wk); Reece Topley; John Turner

On 21 October 2024, Jos Buttler was ruled out of the ODI series due to his long-standing calf injury, and Liam Livingstone was announced as the captain. Michael Pepper was added to the squad as cover for Buttler. On 24 October 2024, Rehan Ahmed and Jordan Cox were added to the both ODI and T20I squad. On 11 November, Jafer Chohan was released from T20I squad to prepare for England Lions against South Africa.

On 12 November, Cricket West Indies announced the T20I squad for rest of the series where Andre Russell was ruled out of the series due to a left ankle sprain, and Shamar Springer named as his replacement. Alzarri Joseph returned to the squad after a two match-suspension, replacing Shamar Joseph. On 15 November, Obed McCoy was added in the squad as a replacement for the injured Matthew Forde, who suffered with a thigh strain during training.

== ODI series ==
=== 1st ODI ===
31 October 2024
14:00 (D/N)
Scorecard

England; 209 (45.1 overs)	v	West Indies; 157/2 (25.5 overs)
Liam Livingstone 48 (49); Gudakesh Motie 4/41 (10 overs)		Evin Lewis 94 (69); Liam Livingstone 1/32 (5.5 overs)

West Indies won by 8 wickets (DLS method)
Sir Vivian Richards Stadium, North Sound
Umpires: Leslie Reifer (WI) and Rod Tucker (Aus)
Player of the match: Gudakesh Motie (WI)

- West Indies won the toss and elected to field.
- Rain interrupted play with West Indies at 81/0 in 15 overs. West Indies were then set a revised target of 157 in 35 overs.
- Jordan Cox, Dan Mousley, Jamie Overton and John Turner (Eng) all made their ODI debuts.
- Liam Livingstone captained England in ODIs for the first time.

=== 2nd ODI ===
2 November 2024
09:30
Scorecard

West Indies; 328/6 (50 overs)	v	England; 329/5 (47.3 overs)
Shai Hope 117 (127); John Turner 2/42 (6 overs)		Liam Livingstone 124* (85); Matthew Forde 3/48 (8.3 overs)

England won by 5 wickets
Sir Vivian Richards Stadium, North Sound
Umpires: Gregory Brathwaite (WI) and Allahudien Paleker (SA)
Player of the match: Liam Livingstone (Eng)

- England won the toss and elected to field.
- Shamar Joseph (WI) made his ODI debut.
- Liam Livingstone (Eng) scored his first century in ODIs.

=== 3rd ODI ===
6 November 2024
14:00 (D/N)
Scorecard

England; 263/8 (50 overs)	v	West Indies; 267/2 (43 overs)
Phil Salt 74 (108); Matthew Forde 3/35 (10 overs)		Keacy Carty 128* (114); Jamie Overton 1/17 (4 overs)

West Indies won by 8 wickets
Kensington Oval, Bridgetown
Umpires: Allahudien Paleker (SA) and Leslie Reifer (WI)
Player of the match: Brandon King (WI)

- West Indies won the toss and elected to field.
- Keacy Carty (WI) scored his first century in ODIs.

== T20I series ==
=== 1st T20I ===
9 November 2024
16:00 (D/N)
Scorecard

West Indies; 182/9 (20 overs)	v	England; 183/2 (16.5 overs)
Nicholas Pooran 38 (29); Saqib Mahmood 4/34 (4 overs)		Phil Salt 103* (54); Gudakesh Motie 1/45 (4 overs)

England won by 8 wickets
Kensington Oval, Bridgetown
Umpires: Zahid Bassarath (WI) and Leslie Reifer (WI)
Player of the match: Phil Salt (Eng)

- England won the toss and elected to field.
- Dan Mousley (Eng) made his T20I debut.
- Phil Salt (Eng) scored his 1,000th run in T20Is.

=== 2nd T20I ===
10 November 2024
16:00 (D/N)
Scorecard

West Indies; 158/8 (20 overs)	v	England; 161/3 (14.5 overs)
Rovman Powell 43 (41); Liam Livingstone 2/16 (2 overs)		Jos Buttler 83 (45); Romario Shepherd 2/42 (2.5 overs)

England won by 7 wickets
Kensington Oval, Bridgetown
Umpires: Deighton Butler (WI) and Gregory Brathwaite (WI)
Player of the match: Jos Buttler (Eng)

- England won the toss and elected to field.
- Terrance Hinds (WI) made his T20I debut.
- Nicholas Pooran (WI) played his 100th T20I.

=== 3rd T20I ===
14 November 2024
16:00 (D/N)
Scorecard

West Indies; 145/8 (20 overs)	v	England; 149/7 (19.2 overs)
Rovman Powell 54 (41); Saqib Mahmood 3/17 (4 overs)		Sam Curran 41 (26); Akeal Hosein 4/22 (4 overs)

England won by 3 wickets
Daren Sammy Cricket Ground, Gros Islet
Umpires: Deighton Butler (WI) and Leslie Reifer (WI)
Player of the match: Saqib Mahmood (Eng)

- England won the toss and elected to field.

=== 4th T20I ===
16 November 2024
16:00 (D/N)
Scorecard

England; 218/5 (20 overs)	v	West Indies; 221/5 (19 overs)
Jacob Bethell 62* (32); Gudakesh Motie 2/40 (4 overs)		Evin Lewis 68 (31); Rehan Ahmed 3/43 (4 overs)

West Indies won by 5 wickets
Daren Sammy Cricket Ground, Gros Islet
Umpires: Zahid Bassarath (WI) and Gregory Brathwaite (WI)
Player of the match: Shai Hope (WI)

- West Indies won the toss and elected to field.
- John Turner (Eng) made his T20I debut.

=== 5th T20I ===
17 November 2024
16:00 (D/N)
Scorecard

West Indies; 44/0 (5 overs)	v	England
Evin Lewis 29* (20)

No result
Daren Sammy Cricket Ground, Gros Islet
Umpires: Gregory Brathwaite (WI) and Leslie Reifer (WI)

- England won the toss and elected to field.
- No further play was possible due to rain.
