= Indian cricket team in the West Indies and the United States in 2022 =

International cricket tour

India against the West Indies in 2022
	West Indies	India
- Dates: 22 July – 7 August 2022
Captains	Nicholas Pooran	Shikhar Dhawan (ODIs); Rohit Sharma (T20Is) (Note: Hardik Pandya captained India for the fifth T20I.)

One Day International series
- Results: India won the 3-match series 3–0
Most runs	Shai Hope (144)	Shubman Gill (205)
Most wickets	Alzarri Joseph (4)	Shardul Thakur (7); Yuzvendra Chahal (7)
- Player of the series: Shubman Gill (Ind)

Twenty20 International series
- Results: India won the 5-match series 4–1
Most runs	Shimron Hetmyer (115)	Suryakumar Yadav (135)
Most wickets	Obed McCoy (9)	Ravi Bishnoi (8)
- Player of the series: Arshdeep Singh (Ind)

The India cricket team toured the West Indies and the United States during July and August 2022 to play three One Day Internationals (ODIs) and five Twenty20 International (T20I) matches. The ODIs and the first T20I took place in Trinidad and Tobago, the next two T20Is were played in St. Kitts and Nevis, with the final two T20Is played in Lauderhill, Florida. The full details of the tour were confirmed on 1 June 2022.

In the first ODI, India batted first and made 308/7, going on to win the match by just three runs, with the West Indies making 305/6 from their 50 overs. India won the second ODI by two wickets, with just two balls left in the match, to win the series with a match to play. India won the third and final ODI by 119 runs, to take the series 3–0.

== Background ==
On July 31, after the 1st T20I between West Indies and India, there was an uncertainty on both the team's last two games in the United States, as the members of both the sides did not receive their US visas on time, which forced CWI to think of an alternate plan of scheduling last two matches in West Indies itself. The initial plan was to handover the US travel documents to both teams in St Kitts, when they arrived as the last two matches were scheduled to be held in Central Broward Park in Lauderhill in Florida on August 6 and August 7.

After the 3rd T20I, the teams flew to Georgetown in Guyana after CWI arranged their appointments; with the intervention and diplomatic efforts by Guyana's President Irfaan Ali, both the teams received their visas and the matches went ahead as scheduled. 14 members of the Indian team did not have the travel approvals including the coaching staff, and they had to attend the interviews to get their visas approved which included Indian team's captain Rohit Sharma and coach Rahul Dravid. While Ravindra Jadeja, Ravichandran Ashwin, Dinesh Karthik, Ravi Bishnoi, Suryakumar Yadav and Kuldeep Yadav were already present in Miami as they had their visas issued to them before.

== Squads ==
ODIs		T20Is	
West Indies	India	West Indies	India
Nicholas Pooran (c); Shai Hope (vc); Shamarh Brooks; Keacy Carty; Jason Holder; Akeal Hosein; Alzarri Joseph; Brandon King; Kyle Mayers; Gudakesh Motie; Keemo Paul; Rovman Powell; Jayden Seales; Romario Shepherd; Hayden Walsh Jr.	Shikhar Dhawan (c); Shreyas Iyer (vc); ~~Ravindra Jadeja (vc)~~; Yuzvendra Chahal; Ruturaj Gaikwad; Shubman Gill; Deepak Hooda; Avesh Khan; Ishan Kishan (wk); Prasidh Krishna; Axar Patel; Sanju Samson (wk); Arshdeep Singh; Mohammed Siraj; Shardul Thakur; Suryakumar Yadav	Nicholas Pooran (c); Rovman Powell (vc); Shamarh Brooks; Dominic Drakes; Shimron Hetmyer; Jason Holder; Akeal Hosein; Alzarri Joseph; Brandon King; Kyle Mayers; Obed McCoy; Keemo Paul; Romario Shepherd; Odean Smith; Devon Thomas; Hayden Walsh Jr.	Rohit Sharma (c); Hardik Pandya (vc); ~~KL Rahul (vc)~~; Ravichandran Ashwin; Ravi Bishnoi; Deepak Hooda; Shreyas Iyer; Ravindra Jadeja; Dinesh Karthik (wk); Avesh Khan; Ishan Kishan (wk); Bhuvneshwar Kumar; Rishabh Pant (wk); Axar Patel; ~~Harshal Patel~~; Sanju Samson (wk); Arshdeep Singh; Kuldeep Yadav; Suryakumar Yadav

The West Indies also named Romario Shepherd and Hayden Walsh Jr. as reserve players for the ODI matches. Ahead of the first ODI, Romario Shepherd was added to the West Indies' squad, after Jason Holder tested positive for COVID-19. Hayden Walsh Jr. was added to the West Indies squad for the second ODI after Gudakesh Motie fractured a thumb in the first match.

Ravindra Jadeja was initially ruled out of India's squad for the first two ODI matches due to a knee injury. He was later ruled out of the third ODI after not recovering from the injury, with Shreyas Iyer named as the team's vice-captain for the series in place of Jadeja. KL Rahul not selected in India's ODI squad due to a sports hernia, but he was selected for the T20I squad. However, he then tested positive for COVID-19, and was ruled out of the T20I series. Sanju Samson was later named as Rahul's replacement for the T20I series andHardik Pandya was appointed as the team's vice-captain for the T20I series. During the fourth T20I, Harshal Patel was ruled out after a rib injury, without playing a single match in the series.

== ODI series ==
=== 1st ODI ===
22 July 2022
09:30
Scorecard

India; 308/7 (50 overs)	v	West Indies; 305/6 (50 overs)
Shikhar Dhawan 97 (99); Gudakesh Motie 2/54 (10 overs)		Kyle Mayers 75 (68); Shardul Thakur 2/54 (8 overs)

India won by 3 runs
Queen's Park Oval, Trinidad and Tobago
Umpires: Leslie Reifer (WI) and Joel Wilson (WI)
Player of the match: Shikhar Dhawan (Ind)

- West Indies won the toss and elected to field.

=== 2nd ODI ===
24 July 2022
09:30
Scorecard

West Indies; 311/6 (50 overs)	v	India; 312/8 (49.4 overs)
Shai Hope 115 (135); Shardul Thakur 3/54 (7 overs)		Axar Patel 64* (35); Alzarri Joseph 2/46 (10 overs)

India won by 2 wickets
Queen's Park Oval, Trinidad and Tobago
Umpires: Gregory Brathwaite (WI) and Joel Wilson (WI)
Player of the match: Axar Patel (Ind)

- West Indies won the toss and elected to bat.
- Avesh Khan (Ind) made his ODI debut.
- Shai Hope (WI) played in his 100th ODI.

=== 3rd ODI ===
27 July 2022
09:30
Scorecard

India; 225/3 (36 overs)	v	West Indies; 137 (26 overs)
Shubman Gill 98* (98); Hayden Walsh Jr. 2/57 (8 overs)		Nicholas Pooran 42 (32); Yuzvendra Chahal 4/17 (4 overs)

India won by 119 runs (DLS method)
Queen's Park Oval, Trinidad and Tobago
Umpires: Nigel Duguid (WI) and Joel Wilson (WI)
Player of the match: Shubman Gill (Ind)

- India won the toss and elected to bat.
- West Indies were set a revised target of 257 runs from 35 overs due to rain.

== T20I series ==
=== 1st T20I ===
29 July 2022
10:30
Scorecard

India; 190/6 (20 overs)	v	West Indies; 122/8 (20 overs)
Rohit Sharma 64 (44); Alzarri Joseph 2/46 (4 overs)		Shamarh Brooks 20 (15); Ravichandran Ashwin 2/22 (4 overs)

India won by 68 runs
Brian Lara Cricket Academy, Trinidad and Tobago
Umpires: Nigel Duguid (WI) and Leslie Reifer (WI)
Player of the match: Dinesh Karthik (Ind)

- West Indies won the toss and elected to field.
- Alzarri Joseph (WI) made his T20I debut.
- This was the first T20I match to be played at this ground.

=== 2nd T20I ===
1 August 2022
13:30
Scorecard

India; 138 (19.4 overs)	v	West Indies; 141/5 (19.2 overs)
Hardik Pandya 31 (31); Obed McCoy 6/17 (4 overs)		Brandon King 68 (52); Ravindra Jadeja 1/16 (3 overs)

West Indies won by 5 wickets
Warner Park, St. Kitts and Nevis
Umpires: Gregory Brathwaite (WI) and Leslie Reifer (WI)
Player of the match: Obed McCoy (WI)

- West Indies won the toss and elected to field.
- The match was originally scheduled to start at 10:30, but it was delayed by three hours due to delays in bringing luggage from Trinidad to St Kitts.
- Obed McCoy recorded the best bowling figures in T20Is for the West Indies.

=== 3rd T20I ===
2 August 2022
12:00
Scorecard

West Indies; 164/5 (20 overs)	v	India; 165/3 (19 overs)
Kyle Mayers 73 (50); Bhuvneshwar Kumar 2/35 (4 overs)		Suryakumar Yadav 76 (44); Akeal Hosein 1/28 (4 overs)

India won by 7 wickets
Warner Park, St. Kitts and Nevis
Umpires: Nigel Duguid (WI) and Patrick Gustard (WI)
Player of the match: Suryakumar Yadav (Ind)

- India won the toss and elected to field.
- The match was originally scheduled to start at 10:30, but it was delayed by one and half hours to ensure that the players receive adequate rest and recover time from back-to-back matches in St Kitts.

=== 4th T20I ===
6 August 2022
10:30
Scorecard

India; 191/5 (20 overs)	v	West Indies; 132 (19.1 overs)
Rishabh Pant 44 (31); Alzarri Joseph 2/29 (4 overs)		Nicholas Pooran 24 (8); Arshdeep Singh 3/12 (3.1 overs)

India won by 59 runs
Central Broward Regional Park, Lauderhill
Umpires: Gregory Brathwaite (WI) and Patrick Gustard (WI)
Player of the match: Avesh Khan (Ind)

- West Indies won the toss and elected to field.

=== 5th T20I ===
7 August 2022
10:30
Scorecard

India; 188/7 (20 overs)	v	West Indies; 100 (15.4 overs)
Shreyas Iyer 64 (40); Odean Smith 3/33 (4 overs)		Shimron Hetmyer 56 (35); Ravi Bishnoi 4/16 (2.4 overs)

India won by 88 runs
Central Broward Regional Park, Lauderhill
Umpires: Gregory Brathwaite (WI) and Leslie Reifer (WI)
Player of the match: Axar Patel (Ind)

- India won the toss and elected to bat.
- Shreyas Iyer (Ind) scored his 1000th run in T20Is.
- India's bowling innings was the first time in a men's T20I innings that all ten wickets were taken by spinners.
