= Indian cricket team in the West Indies in 2016 =

International cricket tour

	West Indies	India
- Dates: 9 July 2016 – 28 August 2016
Captains	Jason Holder (Tests); Carlos Brathwaite (T20Is)	Virat Kohli (Tests); MS Dhoni (T20Is)

Test series
- Result: India won the 4-match series 2–0
Most runs	Kraigg Brathwaite (200)	Virat Kohli (251)
Most wickets	Miguel Cummins (9)	Ravichandran Ashwin (17)
- Player of the series: Ravichandran Ashwin (Ind)

Twenty20 International series
- Results: West Indies won the 2-match series 1–0
Most runs	Evin Lewis (107)	KL Rahul (110)
Most wickets	Dwayne Bravo (2)	Jasprit Bumrah (4)

The Indian cricket team toured the West Indies for a four-match Test series. Prior to the four Test matches, there were two tour matches. The tour coincided with the 2016 Caribbean Premier League. This was the first bilateral tour between the two sides since the West Indies pulled out of the previous tour in October 2014.

In July 2016 the Board of Control for Cricket in India (BCCI) met with West Indies Cricket Board (WICB) to look at the possibility of adding three Twenty20 International (T20I) matches to the tour. The WICB requested that the matches could be played at the Central Broward Regional Park in Florida at the end of August. The West Indies previously played T20I matches in the United States against New Zealand in June 2012. There were fears that it may have taken up to six weeks to secure visas for the Indian team, but both the BCCI and WICB secured them in time. On 2 August, the BCCI confirmed that there would be two T20I matches played in Florida at the end of August.

India won the Test series 2–0 and the West Indies won the T20I series 1–0.

== Squads ==
Tests		T20Is	
West Indies	India	West Indies	India
Jason Holder (c); Kraigg Brathwaite (vc); Devendra Bishoo; Jermaine Blackwood; Carlos Brathwaite; Darren Bravo; Rajendra Chandrika; Roston Chase; Miguel Cummins; Shane Dowrich (wk); Shannon Gabriel; Shai Hope; Leon Johnson; Alzarri Joseph; Marlon Samuels	Virat Kohli (c); Ajinkya Rahane (vc); Ravichandran Ashwin; Stuart Binny; Shikhar Dhawan; Ravindra Jadeja; Bhuvneshwar Kumar; Amit Mishra; Cheteshwar Pujara; KL Rahul; Wriddhiman Saha (wk); Mohammed Shami; Ishant Sharma; Rohit Sharma; Shardul Thakur; Murali Vijay; Umesh Yadav	Carlos Brathwaite (c); Samuel Badree; Dwayne Bravo; Johnson Charles; Andre Fletcher; Chris Gayle; Jason Holder; Evin Lewis; Sunil Narine; Kieron Pollard; Andre Russell; Marlon Samuels; Lendl Simmons	MS Dhoni (c, wk); Ravichandran Ashwin; Stuart Binny; Jasprit Bumrah; Shikhar Dhawan; Ravindra Jadeja; Virat Kohli; Bhuvneshwar Kumar; Amit Mishra; Ajinkya Rahane; KL Rahul; Rohit Sharma; Mohammed Shami; Umesh Yadav

== Tour matches ==
=== Two-day: WICB President's XI v Indians ===
9–10 July 2016
Scorecard

Indians	v	WICB President's XI
258/6d (93 overs); Rohit Sharma 54* (109); Jomel Warrican 2/61 (26 overs)		281/7 (87 overs); Shai Hope 118* (229); Amit Mishra 4/67 (27 overs)

Match drawn
Warner Park, Basseterre, St. Kitts
Umpires: Gregory Brathwaite (WI) and Nigel Duguid (WI)

- Indians won the toss and elected to bat.
- 12 players per side, 11 batting, 11 fielding.

=== Three-day: WICB President's XI v Indians ===
14–16 July 2016
Scorecard

WICB President's XI	v	Indians
180 (62.4 overs); Rahkeem Cornwall 41 (56); Ravindra Jadeja 3/16 (13 overs)		364 (105.4 overs); KL Rahul 64 (127); Rahkeem Cornwall 5/118 (31.4 overs)
223/6 (86 overs); Jermaine Blackwood 51 (143); Ravichandran Ashwin 3/59 (20 overs)

Match drawn
Warner Park, Basseterre, St. Kitts
Umpires: Gregory Brathwaite (WI) and Nigel Duguid (WI)

- West Indies Cricket Board President's XI won the toss and elected to bat.
- 13 players per side, 11 batting, 11 fielding.

== Test series ==
=== 1st Test ===
21–25 July 2016
Scorecard

India	v	West Indies
566/8d (161.5 overs); Virat Kohli 200 (283); Kraigg Brathwaite 3/65 (14.5 overs)		243 (90.2 overs); Kraigg Brathwaite 74 (281); Umesh Yadav 4/44 (18 overs)
		231 (78 overs) (f/o); Carlos Brathwaite 51* (82); Ravichandran Ashwin 7/83 (25 overs)

India won by an innings and 92 runs
Sir Vivian Richards Stadium, North Sound, Antigua
Umpires: Aleem Dar (Pak) and Ian Gould (Eng)
Player of the match: Ravichandran Ashwin (Ind)

- India won the toss and elected to bat.
- Roston Chase (WI) made his Test debut.
- Ian Gould (Eng) stood in his 50th Test match as an umpire.
- Virat Kohli (Ind) scored his first double-century in Tests and it was the first double-century made away from home by an Indian captain.
- Ravichandran Ashwin's second innings figures of 7/83 are the best for an Indian bowler in the West Indies.
- This was the biggest win for India outside of Asia and biggest defeat for the West Indies at home in Tests.
- Ravichandran Ashwin moved to the top of the ICC's Test rankings for bowlers.

=== 2nd Test ===
30 July–3 August 2016
Scorecard

West Indies	v	India
196 (52.3 overs); Jermaine Blackwood 62 (62); Ravichandran Ashwin 5/52 (16 overs)		500/9d (171.1 overs); KL Rahul 158 (303); Roston Chase 5/121 (36.1 overs)
388/6 (104 overs); Roston Chase 137* (269); Mohammed Shami 2/82 (19 overs)

Match drawn
Sabina Park, Kingston, Jamaica
Umpires: Aleem Dar (Pak) and Ian Gould (Eng)
Player of the match: Roston Chase (WI)

- West Indies won the toss and elected to bat.
- Rain stopped play after India declared on Day 3, with play being abandoned for the day.
- Rain stopped play after lunch on Day 4, with play being abandoned for the day.
- Miguel Cummins (WI) made his Test debut.
- Ravichandran Ashwin (Ind) took his 18th five-wicket haul when he dismissed Jason Holder.
- KL Rahul scored his highest Test score, and also scored the most runs by an Indian batsman in their first Test innings in the West Indies.
- Roston Chase (WI) took his first five-wicket haul.
- Ajinkya Rahane (Ind) became the only player to score 90 or more in an innings in eight consecutive Test series, starting from India's tour to South Africa in 2013-14.
- Roston Chase (WI) scored his maiden Test century and became the fourth West Indian player to score a century and take five wickets in an innings in the same Test.

=== 3rd Test ===
9–13 August 2016
Scorecard

India	v	West Indies
353 (129.4 overs); Ravichandran Ashwin 118 (297); Miguel Cummins 3/54 (21.4 overs)		225 (103.4 overs); Kraigg Brathwaite 64 (163); Bhuvneshwar Kumar 5/33 (23.4 overs)
217/7d (48 overs); Ajinkya Rahane 78* (116); Miguel Cummins 6/48 (11 overs)		108 (47.3 overs); Darren Bravo 50 (100); Mohammed Shami 3/15 (11 overs)

India won by 237 runs
Daren Sammy Cricket Ground, Gros Islet, St. Lucia
Umpires: Nigel Llong (Eng) and Rod Tucker (Aus)
Player of the match: Ravichandran Ashwin (Ind)

- West Indies won the toss and elected to field.
- No play was possible on Day 3 due to rain.
- Alzarri Joseph (WI) made his Test debut.
- Ravichandran Ashwin (Ind) became the fourth player to score more than one century and take more than one five-wicket haul in the same Test series.
- Virat Kohli became the first captain of India to win two Tests in the West Indies.

=== 4th Test ===
18–22 August 2016
Scorecard

West Indies	v	India
62/2 (22 overs); Kraigg Brathwaite 32* (78); Ishant Sharma 1/7 (5 overs)

Match drawn
Queen's Park Oval, Port of Spain, Trinidad and Tobago
Umpires: Nigel Llong (Eng) and Rod Tucker (Aus)

- West Indies won the toss and elected to bat.
- Rain stopped play after lunch on Day 1, with play being abandoned for the day.
- No play was possible on Day 2, 3, 4 and 5 due to rain and a wet outfield.
- This was the third-shortest non-abandoned Test match.
- India lost the top position in the ICC Rankings to Pakistan as a result of this match.

== T20I series ==
=== 1st T20I ===
27 August 2016
Scorecard

West Indies; 245/6 (20 overs)	v	India; 244/4 (20 overs)
Evin Lewis 100 (49); Ravindra Jadeja 2/39 (3 overs)		KL Rahul 110* (51); Dwayne Bravo 2/37 (4 overs)

West Indies won by 1 run
Central Broward Regional Park, Lauderhill, Florida
Umpires: Nigel Duguid (WI) and Joel Wilson (WI)
Player of the match: Evin Lewis (WI)

- India won the toss and elected to field.
- This was India's first cricket match to be played in the United States.
- Evin Lewis (WI) and KL Rahul (Ind) both scored their maiden centuries in a T20I.
- The West Indies hit 21 sixes in their innings, the most for any team in a T20I.
- This was the highest aggregate total (489 runs) in any T20 game.

=== 2nd T20I ===
28 August 2016
Scorecard

West Indies; 143 (19.4 overs)	v	India; 15/0 (2 overs)
Johnson Charles 43 (25); Amit Mishra 3/24 (4 overs)		Rohit Sharma 10* (8)

No result
Central Broward Regional Park, Lauderhill, Florida
Umpires: Leslie Reifer (WI) and Joel Wilson (WI)

- India won the toss and elected to field.
- The start of the match was delayed by 40 minutes due to technical reasons.
- Rain stopped play after 2 overs of India's innings, with no further play possible.
- Leslie Reifer (WI) stood in his first T20I match as an umpire.
- Ravichandran Ashwin (Ind) took his 200th wicket in T20 matches.
- Ajinkya Rahane (Ind) played in his last T20I.
