= Gidron Pope =

West Indian cricketer

Personal information
- Full name: Gidron Dameon Pope
- Born: 24 November 1996 (age 29); Mount Greenan, Saint Vincent
- Batting: Left-handed
- Bowling: Right-arm off-spin
- Role: All-rounder

Domestic team information
- Years: Team
- 2016: Windward Islands
- 2016: St Lucia Zouks
- Source: CricketArchive, 29 March 2016

Gidron Dameon Pope (born 24 November 1996) is a Vincentian cricketer who plays for the Windward Islands and the St Lucia Zouks in West Indian domestic cricket. He plays as an all-rounder, bowling right-arm off-spin and batting left-handed.

Pope was a member of the West Indies under-19s team that won the 2016 Under-19 World Cup in Bangladesh, appearing in all six of their matches. He scored 232 runs, including 60 against England and 76 against Fiji, and took seven wickets, including 4/24 against Fiji. Among his teammates, only Shamar Springer took more runs and only Alzarri Joseph took more wickets (although Shamar Springer and Keemo Paul took the same number as Pope). In March 2016, Pope was selected to make his first-class debut for the Windward Islands, playing against Jamaica in the 2015–16 Regional Four Day Competition.

He made his List A debut for the Windward Islands in the 2018–19 Regional Super50 tournament on 17 October 2018. In October 2019, he was named in the West Indies Emerging Team for the 2019–20 Regional Super50 tournament.
