= Vishaul Singh =

Guyanese cricketer

Personal information
- Full name: Vishaul Anthony Singh
- Born: 12 January 1989 (age 37); Georgetown, Guyana
- Batting: Left-handed
- Bowling: Slow left-arm orthodox
- Role: Batter

International information
- National side: West Indies
- Test debut (cap 311): 21 April 2017 v Pakistan
- Last Test: 4 May 2017 v Pakistan

Domestic team information
- Years: Team
- 2009–: Guyana

Career statistics
Competition	Test	FC	LA
Matches	3	80	8
Runs scored	63	4,247	213
Batting average	10.50	33.97	30.42
100s/50s	0/0	9/19	0/0
Top score	32	161	49
Catches/stumpings	2/–	52/–	0/–
- Source: Cricinfo, 5 May 2017

Vishaul Anthony Singh (born 12 January 1989) is a Guyanese cricketer who plays for the West Indies. His domestic side is Guyanese national side. He is a left-handed middle-order batsman.

== Domestic career ==
Singh made his first-class debut for Guyana during the 2008–09 Regional Four Day Competition, against Barbados. He made his first half-century for the team during the 2010–11 season, scoring 66 from 164 balls in a home match against Barbados. Singh's maiden first-class century came during the 2014–15 season, when he scored 141 from 229 balls against Trinidad and Tobago to help his team win by an innings. He continued his good form during the 2015–16 season, making centuries in consecutive matches against the Leeward Islands (150 from 385 balls) and Barbados (121 from 241 balls).

In May 2023, Singh announced that he planned to take legal action against the Guyana Cricket Board for non-payment of his salary and damage to his personal reputation.

== International career ==
In April 2017, he was named in the West Indies Test squad for their series against Pakistan. He made his Test debut for the West Indies against Pakistan on 21 April 2017 at Sabina Park.He scored 9 Runs in his first innings and was caught out by Wahab Riaz. His poor run continued and was subsequently not selected for the West Indies tour of England 2017.
