= Mario Rampersaud =

Barbadian cricketer (born 1992)

Personal information
- Full name: Mario Amar Rampersaud
- Born: 24 November 1992 (age 33)
- Batting: Left-handed
- Role: Wicket-keeper

Domestic team information
- Years: Team
- 2015/16–2017/18: Barbados

Career statistics
Competition	First-class	List A
Matches	14	3
Runs scored	291	32
Batting average	17.11	10.66
100s/50s	0/0	0/0
Top score	36*	20
Catches/stumpings	27/4	1/0
- Source: CricketArchive, 15 August 2024

Mario Amar Rampersaud (born 24 November 1992) is a Barbadian former cricketer who played for the Barbadian national side in West Indian domestic cricket as a wicket-keeper.

Rampersaud first played for the Barbados under-19s in 2009, aged only 16. However, he did not make a senior appearance until the 2015–16 Regional Four Day Competition, aged 22. Rampersaud made his first-class debut in Barbados' first match of the tournament, against Guyana in November 2015, but had little impact.

In June 2021, he was selected to take part in the Minor League Cricket tournament in the United States following the players' draft.
