= Kemar Brathwaite =

Barbadian cricketer (born 1993)

Personal information
- Full name: Kemar Anderson Brathwaite
- Born: 29 September 1993 (age 33); Foul Bay, Barbados
- Batting: Right-handed
- Bowling: Right-arm medium

Domestic team information
- Years: Team
- 2015: Barbados
- Source: CricketArchive, 12 January 2016

Kemar Anderson Brathwaite (born 29 September 1993) is a Barbadian cricketer who has represented the Barbados national team in West Indian domestic cricket. A right-handed opening batsman, he made his first-class debut in November 2015, playing against Guyana in the 2015–16 Regional Four Day Competition. In the following match, against the Windward Islands, Brathwaite narrowly missed out on a maiden half-century, scoring 46 in the first innings before being bowled by Shane Shillingford.
