= Aldane Thomas =

Jamaican cricketer

Personal information
- Full name: Aldane Oraine Thomas
- Born: 9 December 1994 (age 31); Albion Mountain, Jamaica
- Batting: Right-handed
- Role: Wicket-keeper

Domestic team information
- Years: Team
- 2013–present: Jamaica
- Source: CricketArchive, 29 March 2016

Aldane Oraine Thomas (born 9 December 1994) is a Jamaican cricketer who plays for the Jamaica national team in West Indian domestic cricket. He plays as a wicket-keeper.

Thomas was born in Albion Mountain, in Jamaica's Saint Mary Parish. He made his senior debut for Jamaica at the 2012–13 Caribbean Twenty20 tournament, aged 18, replacing Carlton Baugh as the side's wicket-keeper. Despite playing in all seven of his team's matches at the tournament, Thomas was not selected for Jamaica in any other competitions during the 2012–13 season. He was not again named in a Jamaican squad until the 2015–16 Regional Super50, where he featured in all six of his team's matches. In February 2016, Thomas was selected to make his first-class debut, playing against the Windward Islands in the 2015–16 Regional Four Day Competition.

In October 2019, he was named in Jamaica's squad for the 2019–20 Regional Super50 tournament. In May 2022, in round four of the 2021–22 West Indies Championship, Thomas scored his maiden century in first-class cricket, with 100 runs against Guyana.
