= Uthman Muhammad =

Trinidadian cricketer (born 1989)

Personal information
- Born: 1 March 1989 (age 37); Port of Spain, Trinidad and Tobago

Career statistics
Competition	FC
Matches	7
Runs scored	162
Batting average	16.20
100s/50s	0/1
Top score	53
Balls bowled	935
Wickets	14
Bowling average	38.64
5 wickets in innings	0
10 wickets in match	0
Best bowling	4/28
Catches/stumpings	4/–
- Source: ESPNcricinfo, 10 October 2021

Uthman Muhammad (born 1 March 1989) is a Trinidadian cricketer who represents the Trinidad and Tobago national team in West Indian domestic cricket. He made his first-class debut for Trinidad and Tobago in the 2015–16 Regional Four Day Competition on 4 December 2015.
