= Ewart Nicholson =

Trinidadian cricketer (born 1993)

Personal information
- Born: 22 October 1993 (age 33); Trinidad
- Source: Cricinfo, 28 November 2020

Ewart Nicholson (born 22 October 1993) is a Trinidadian cricketer who played for Trinidad and Tobago. He made his first-class debut for Trinidad and Tobago in the 2015–16 Regional Four Day Competition on 18 March 2016. He made his List A debut for Trinidad and Tobago in the 2017–18 Regional Super50 on 15 February 2018.

== See also ==
- List of Trinidadian representative cricketers
