= Jaison Peters =

Guyanese cricketer (born 1989)

Personal information
- Full name: Rohel Jaison Peters
- Born: 22 November 1989 (age 36); Guyana
- Batting: Right-handed
- Role: Wicket-keeper batsman

Domestic team information
- Years: Team
- 2010/11–2019/20: Leeward Islands
- First-class debut: 11 March 2011 Leeward Islands v Trinidad and Tobago
- Last First-class: 15 March 2019 Leeward Islands v Barbados
- List A debut: 24 October 2011 Leeward Islands v Combined Campuses and Colleges
- Last List A: 18 October 2018 Leeward Islands v USA

Career statistics
Competition	FC	LA
Matches	15	5
Runs scored	389	50
Batting average	16.91	12.50
100s/50s	0/2	0/0
Top score	59*	40
Catches/stumpings	14/1	2/2
- Source: ESPNcricinfo, 10 October 2021

Rohel Jaison Peters (born 22 November 1989) is a Montserratian cricketer who plays for the Leeward Islands in West Indian domestic cricket. He plays as a wicket-keeper.

Peters was born in Guyana, but raised on Montserrat, playing for the Montserrat national team in inter-island matches. He made his first-class debut for the Leeward Islands during the 2010–11 Regional Four Day Competition, against Trinidad and Tobago on 11 March 2011, scoring one run in the first innings and 33 in the second as the Leeward Islands won by 29 runs. His only List A appearance came in a Regional Super50 match against the Combined Campuses and Colleges on 24 October 2011; he scored 40 runs and made two dismissals (one catch, one stumping) as the Combined Campuses and Colleges won by four wickets. Peters has made only sporadic appearances for the Leewards since his debut, with Jahmar Hamilton generally being preferred as wicket-keeper.
