= Keacy Carty =

West Indian cricketer

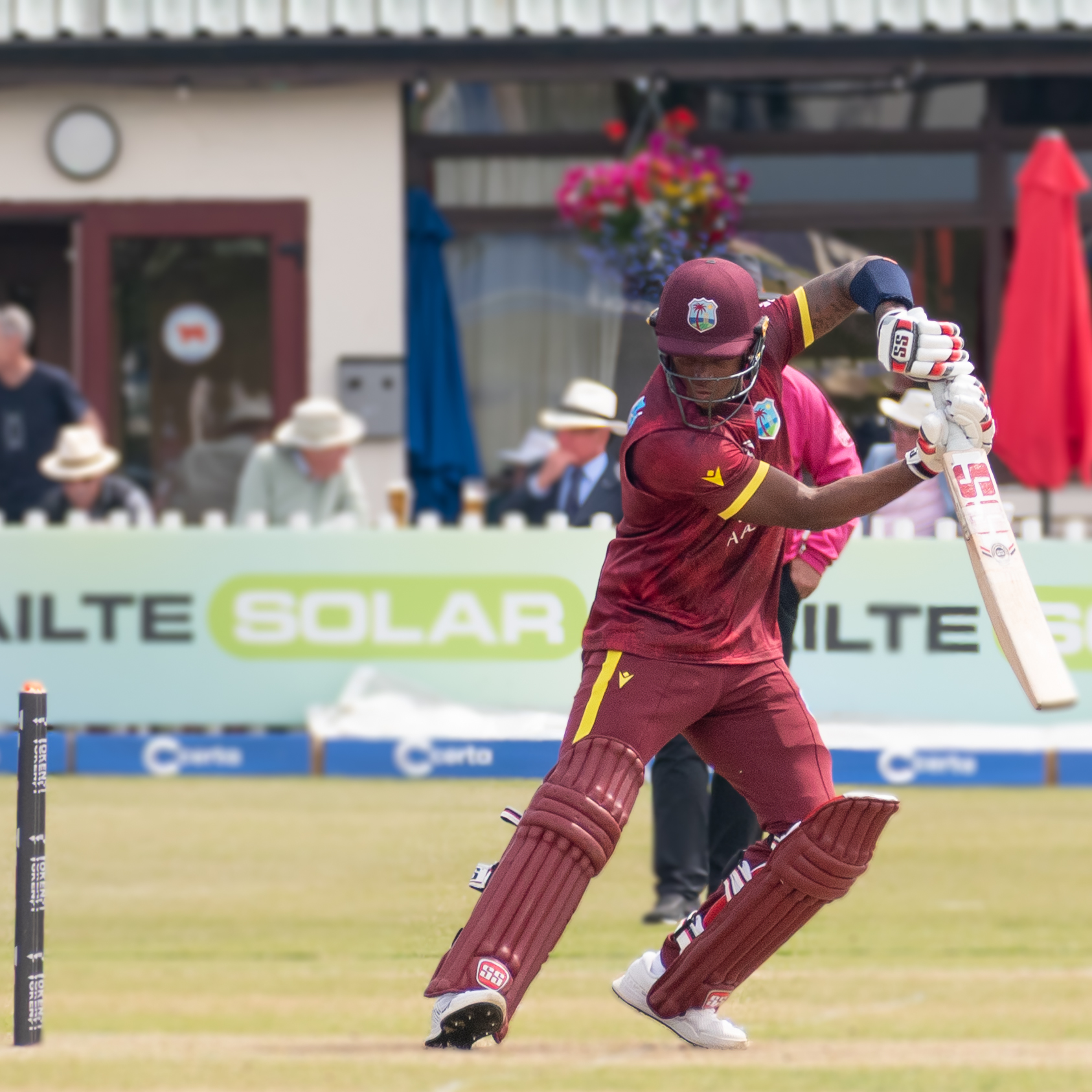
- Keacy Carty batting in the 2nd WI vs Ireland ODI at Clontarf in May 2025

Personal information
- Full name: Keacy Uydess Carty
- Born: 19 March 1997 (age 29); Sint Maarten
- Batting: Right-handed
- Bowling: Right-arm medium
- Role: Batter

International information
- National side: West Indies (2022–present)
- Test debut (cap 340): 7 August 2024 v South Africa
- Last Test: 3 July 2025 v Australia
- ODI debut (cap 210): 31 May 2022 v Netherlands
- Last ODI: 3 November 2025 v New Zealand
- T20I debut (cap 101): 15 June 2025 v Ireland
- Last T20I: 30 September 2025 v Nepal

Domestic team information
- Years: Team
- 2015/16–present: Leeward Islands
- 2022: St Kitts & Nevis Patriots
- 2023–present: Trinbago Knight Riders

Career statistics
Competition	Test	ODI	T20I	FC
Matches	7	53	8	64
Runs scored	235	1,814	80	3,105
Batting average	16.78	41.22	16.00	27.23
100s/50s	0/0	4/6	0/0	4/20
Top score	42	170	49*	147
Balls bowled	0	28	–	295
Wickets	0	0	–	4
Bowling average	–	–	–	44.00
5 wickets in innings	0	0	–	0
10 wickets in match	0	0	–	0
Best bowling	–	–	–	3/30
Catches/stumpings	1/–	9/–	2/–	27/–
- Source: Cricinfo, 26 July 2026

Keacy Uydess Carty (born 19 March 1997) is a Sint Maarten cricketer who represents the Leeward Islands in West Indian domestic cricket. He is a right-handed middle-order batsman. He made his international debut for the West Indies cricket team in May 2022.

== Career ==
Born in Sint Maarten to an Anguillan immigrant father, Carty debuted for the Leeward Islands under-19s in 2013, aged 16. He made his West Indies under-19s debut at the 2014–15 Regional Super50, where matches held List A status. Carty played in all three of his team's matches in the competition, against Trinidad and Tobago, the Leeward Islands, and Jamaica.

In December 2015, Carty was named in the West Indies squad for the 2016 Under-19 World Cup. At the tournament, which began in January 2016, he played in all six of his team's matches, becoming the first Sint Maartener to play for a West Indies team (at any level). In the tournament final, against India, Carty scored 52 not out from 125 balls to guide the West Indies to a five-wicket victory, for which he was named player of the final. On his return to Sint Maarten, he was received by both the country's prime minister, William Marlin, and governor, Eugene Holiday.

Carty made his senior debut for the Leeward Islands debut later in February 2016, playing against Trinidad and Tobago in the 2015–16 Regional Four Day Competition. He opened the batting with Montcin Hodge on debut, and in the second innings scored a maiden first-class half-century, 59 runs from 115 balls. On 10 February 2021, in the 2020–21 Super50 Cup tournament, Carty scored his first century in List A cricket, with an unbeaten 123 runs.

In May 2022, he was named in the West Indies One Day International (ODI) squads for their series against the Netherlands and Pakistan. He became the first Sint Maarten player to be selected for the West Indies. He made his ODI debut on 31 May 2022, for the West Indies against the Netherlands. He made his Twenty20 debut on 21 September 2022, for St Kitts & Nevis Patriots in the 2022 Caribbean Premier League.

In November 2023, he was selected in West Indies's squad for the ODI series against England. He scored a match-winning half century against England in the third ODI. in the same third one day international against the same opponents {England} he became the first cricketer from Dutch Sint Maarten to score a maiden one day international century to take the West Indies home by eight wickets
