= Jonathan Carter (cricketer) =

Barbadian cricketer

Personal information
- Full name: Jonathan Lyndon Carter
- Born: 16 November 1987 (age 38); Belleplaine, Barbados
- Batting: Left-handed
- Bowling: Right-arm medium-fast
- Role: Batting all-rounder

International information
- National side: West Indies (2015–2019)
- ODI debut (cap 168): 16 January 2015 v South Africa
- Last ODI: 17 May 2019 v Bangladesh
- ODI shirt no.: 78

Domestic team information
- Years: Team
- 2007–present: Barbados
- 2017: St Kitts and Nevis Patriots
- 2019–present: Barbados Tridents

Career statistics
Competition	ODI	FC	LA	T20
Matches	33	82	132	93
Runs scored	581	4,157	3,585	1,528
Batting average	23.24	31.02	33.19	21.82
100s/50s	0/3	5/24	3/23	1/7
Top score	54	149*	133	111*
Balls bowled	136	2,931	1,255	177
Wickets	4	55	32	6
Bowling average	40.00	26.61	31.68	45.66
5 wickets in innings	0	1	1	0
10 wickets in match	0	0	0	0
Best bowling	2/14	5/63	5/26	2/28
Catches/stumpings	7/–	121/–	40/–	36/1
- Source: Cricinfo, 9 October 2021

Jonathan Lyndon Carter (born 16 November 1987) is a Barbadian cricketer who currently plays for Barbados. He is a big-hitting left-handed batsman who also bowls right-arm medium pace. He made his international debut for the West Indies in January 2015.

Carter first played for Barbados in 2007 in a List A match against West Indies Under-19s. He has represented West Indies A. He averages around 30 in first-class cricket currently. He made his One Day International debut for the West Indies against South Africa on 16 January 2015.

== Career ==
Carter has appeared for West Indies A, Barbados and Barbados Tridents in the Caribbean Premier League (CPL). In September 2013, he scored a century for West Indies A against India A. After a long wait, Carter finally got his first century in first-class cricket against Jamaica. In 2014, he scored his second List A hundred, this time for Barbados in the Regional Super 50, scoring 109. He later scored his second first-class ton against Jamaica.

Carter was named in West Indies’ 15 man squad for the 2015 World Cup.

Carter also jointly holds the record for taking the most catches by a substitute fielder in a T20I innings (2) along with Jeetan Patel, Eoin Morgan, Hashim Amla, Johnson Charles and Chamu Chibhabha.

In the 2017 CPL draft, Carter was selected by the St Kitts & Nevis Patriots.

In March 2017, Carter was named in the West Indies squad for the Twenty20 International (T20I) series against Pakistan, but he did not play.

Carter was the leading run-scorer in the 2018–19 Regional Super50 tournament, with 351 runs in eight matches.

In May 2019, Cricket West Indies (CWI) named Carter as one of ten reserve players in the West Indies' squad for the 2019 Cricket World Cup. In October 2019, he was named as the captain of Barbados for the 2019–20 Regional Super50 tournament. In July 2020, he was named in the Barbados Tridents squad for the 2020 Caribbean Premier League. He was also named for the Philadelphians in the Minor League Cricket season in July 2021.
