= Roston Chase =

Barbadian cricketer (born 1992)

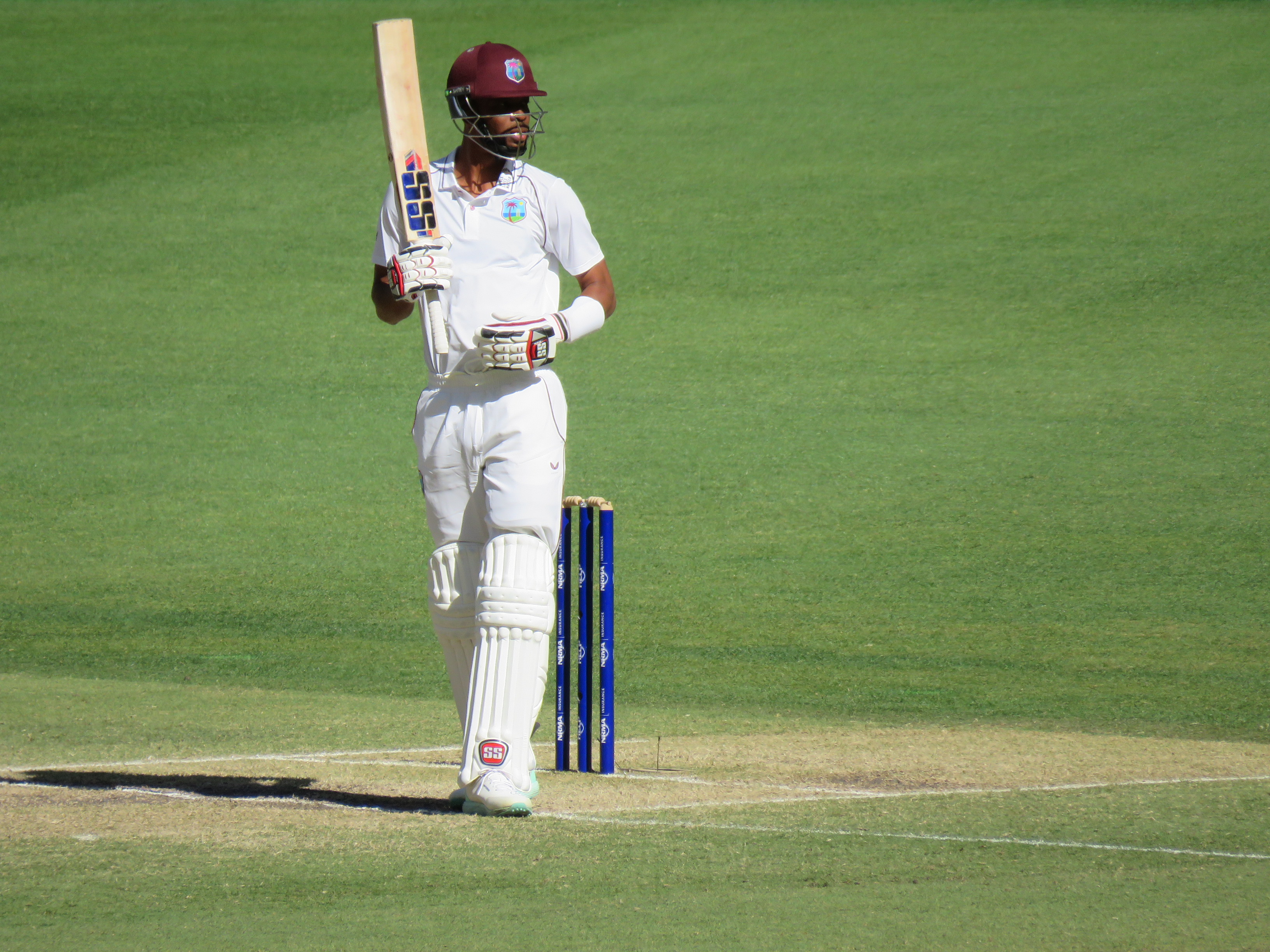
- Roston Chase batting during the First Test Australia versus West Indies Perth Stadium, 2 December 2022

Personal information
- Full name: Roston Lamar Chase
- Born: 22 March 1992 (age 34); Christ Church, Barbados
- Batting: Right-handed
- Bowling: Right-arm off-break
- Role: All-rounder

International information
- National side: West Indies (2016–present)
- Test debut (cap 307): 21 July 2016 v India
- Last Test: 25 June 2026 v Sri Lanka
- ODI debut (cap 178): 9 June 2017 v Afghanistan
- Last ODI: 6 June 2026 v Sri Lanka
- ODI shirt no.: 10
- T20I debut (cap 87): 29 October 2021 v Bangladesh
- Last T20I: 14 June 2026 v Sri Lanka

Domestic team information
- Years: Team
- 2011–present: Barbados (squad no. 70)
- 2018: Barbados Tridents
- 2020–present: Saint Lucia Kings (squad no. 22)
- 2024: Comilla Victorians
- 2024/25: Guyana Amazon Warriors
- 2026: Pretoria Capitals

Career statistics
Competition	Test	ODI	T20I	FC
Matches	58	71	60	116
Runs scored	2,680	1,191	846	5,914
Batting average	26.01	25.89	23.50	33.41
100s/50s	6/11	0/6	0/4	12/30
Top score	194	94	67*	194
Balls bowled	7,749	2,548	916	13,564
Wickets	94	47	40	207
Bowling average	48.53	44.44	28.90	35.01
5 wickets in innings	4	0	0	11
10 wickets in match	0	0	0	2
Best bowling	8/60	3/30	3/12	8/60
Catches/stumpings	30/0	33/0	19/0	65/0
- Source: Cricinfo, 1 July 2026

Roston Lamar Chase (born 22 March 1992) is a Barbadian cricketer who plays for the West Indies and Barbados. An all-rounder, he is a right-handed batsman and a right-arm off spin bowler. In July 2017, he was named Cricketer of the Year and Test Cricketer of the Year by the West Indies Players' Association.

== Domestic career ==
From the parish of Christ Church, Chase made his senior debut for Barbados during the 2010–11 Regional Four Day Competition, aged 18. After two matches in his debut season, he did not appear again until the 2012–13 competition, although he has since become a regular in the team. During the 2014–15 season, Chase scored a maiden first-class century, 120 not out from 241 balls against the Windward Islands. He finished the season with 534 runs from eight matches, which placed him fourth for Barbados and eighth in the overall competition. Chase continued his good form during the 2015–16 season, being named man of the match against the Leeward Islands after making 136 not out in his team's first innings.

In June 2018, Chase was named the Best Regional Limited-Overs Cricketer of the Year at the annual Cricket West Indies' Awards. Ahead of the 2018 Caribbean Premier League, he was named as one of five players to watch in the tournament.

In October 2018, Cricket West Indies (CWI) awarded Chase a red-ball contract for the 2018–19 season.

== International career ==
In July 2016, Chase was named in the West Indies squad for their Test series against India. He made his Test debut for the West Indies on 21 July 2016. In his second Test match, Chase picked up his maiden five-wicket haul and scored a century to stave off a strong Indian bowling attack.

In June 2017, Chase was named in the West Indies One Day International (ODI) squad for their series against Afghanistan. He made his ODI debut for the West Indies, against Afghanistan on 9 June 2017.

On 26 January 2019, Chase achieved bowling figures of 8/60 in the fourth innings of the first Test against England in Barbados adding a 54 with the bat in the first innings.

In May 2019, Cricket West Indies (CWI) named Chase as one of ten reserve players in the West Indies' squad for the 2019 Cricket World Cup. In June 2020, Chase was named in the West Indies' Test squad, for their series against England. The Test series was originally scheduled to start in May 2020, but was moved back to July 2020 due to the COVID-19 pandemic.

In September 2021, Chase was named in the West Indies' Twenty20 International (T20I) squad for the 2021 ICC Men's T20 World Cup. He made his T20I debut on 29 October 2021, for the West Indies against Bangladesh.

In May 2024, he was named in the West Indies squad for the 2024 ICC Men's T20 World Cup tournament.

In May 2025, Chase was named as West Indies Test captain following the resignation of Kraigg Brathwaite.

During the 1st Test match against Sri Lanka in June 2026, Chase hit his 6th Test hundred, in a marathon partnership with Amir Jangoo, in which both batters contributed to break the record for largest 6th wicket stand in Test cricket history, sadly though he was dismissed clean bowled for 194 .
