= Miguel Cummins =

Barbadian cricketer

Personal information
- Full name: Miguel Lamar Cummins
- Born: 5 September 1990 (age 36); St. Michael Parish, Barbados
- Batting: Left-handed
- Bowling: Right-arm fast
- Role: Bowler

International information
- National side: West Indies (2014–2019)
- Test debut (cap 308): 30 July 2016 v India
- Last Test: 22 August 2019 v India
- ODI debut (cap 167): 23 February 2014 v Ireland
- Last ODI: 29 September 2017 v England
- ODI shirt no.: 41

Domestic team information
- Years: Team
- 2012–present: Barbados
- 2013: Trinidad and Tobago Red Steel
- 2014: Antigua Hawksbills
- 2015: Trinidad and Tobago Red Steel
- 2016: Worcestershire
- 2019–2020: Middlesex
- 2021: Kent
- 2024/25: Durbar Rajshahi

Career statistics
| Competition | Test | ODI | FC | LA |
|---|---|---|---|---|
| Matches | 14 | 11 | 90 | 35 |
| Runs scored | 114 | 10 | 542 | 62 |
| Batting average | 7.60 | 5.00 | 7.63 | 10.33 |
| 100s/50s | 0/0 | 0/0 | 0/0 | 0/0 |
| Top score | 24* | 5 | 29* | 20 |
| Balls bowled | 1,976 | 450 | 12,265 | 1,578 |
| Wickets | 27 | 9 | 237 | 48 |
| Bowling average | 40.14 | 52.66 | 27.69 | 26.16 |
| 5 wickets in innings | 1 | 0 | 10 | 0 |
| 10 wickets in match | 0 | 0 | 1 | 0 |
| Best bowling | 6/48 | 3/82 | 7/45 | 4/27 |
| Catches/stumpings | 2/– | 1/– | 32/– | 10/– |
- Source: Cricinfo, 6 June 2021

Miguel Lamar Cummins (born 5 September 1990) is a Barbadian cricketer who has played in 14 Test matches and 11 One Day Internationals (ODI) for the West Indies.

At domestic level, he plays for Barbados. He has played for both Antigua Hawksbills, Trinidad and Tobago Red Steel in the Caribbean Premier League (CPL) and Middlesex.

== Early career ==
From Saint Michael Parish, Cummins attended Parkinson Memorial Secondary School, best known as the high school attended by Malcolm Marshall. Aged 17, he spent the 2010 English season playing club cricket for Wavertree in the Liverpool and District Cricket Competition's second division, and led the club's batting and bowling averages. Cummins made his first-class season for Barbados two years later, playing a single match in the Regional Four Day Competition. He became a regular in the Barbados side in 2013, taking 35 wickets from eight matches, including three-wicket hauls. This total was beaten only by Nikita Miller (Jamaica), Shane Shillingford (Windward Islands), and Ashley Nurse (Barbados), and was the most by any fast bowler. Barbados won the competition, defeating Trinidad and Tobago in the final by an innings and 22 runs. Cummins took nine wickets in the final (5/30 and 4/75), and was named man of the match. Earlier in the season, against the same team, he had taken 7/45, the best figures of his career.

== Later career and move to England ==
Cummins' good form led to his selection for West Indies A in two series later in 2013. He played a single match against Sri Lanka in June, and then six matches (both first-class and limited-overs) against India A when the West Indians toured the country in September. Ireland toured the West Indies in early 2014 to play one ODI and two Twenty20 International (T20I) matches, with Cummins named in the West Indies' senior ODI squad. On his international debut, he took 1/42 from six overs, having William Porterfield caught down the leg side. During the same over, he had bowled three consecutive no-balls, two of which were hit for sixes by Porterfield. Cummins played for the Trinidad and Tobago Red Steel and the Antigua Hawksbills in the first and second seasons of the Caribbean Premier League (CPL), respectively. A graduate of the West Indies High Performance Centre (WIHPC), he was named Emerging Player of the Year at the 2014 WIPA/WICB Awards, which recognised performances during the previous season.

On 30 July 2016 he made his Test cricket debut for the West Indies against India. In October 2018, Cricket West Indies (CWI) awarded him a red-ball contract for the 2018–19 season.

In October 2019, Cummins signed a three-year deal with Middlesex in England, as a Kolpak player, therefore ruling him out of playing international cricket for the West Indies. Later the same month, he was selected to play for Barbados in the 2019–20 Regional Super50 tournament.

Following the discontinuation of the Kolpak scheme in 2021, Cummins joined Kent for the start of the English season as one of the club's overseas players.

== See also ==
- List of Kolpak cricketers
