= Shannon Gabriel =

West Indian cricketer

Personal information
- Full name: Shannon Terry Gabriel
- Born: 28 April 1988 (age 38); Trinidad, Trinidad and Tobago
- Batting: Right-handed
- Bowling: Right-arm fast
- Role: Bowler

International information
- National side: West Indies (2012–2023)
- Test debut (cap 293): 17 May 2012 v England
- Last Test: 20 July 2023 v India
- ODI debut (cap 171): 21 June 2016 v Australia
- Last ODI: 1 July 2019 v Sri Lanka
- T20I debut (cap 58): 3 March 2013 v Zimbabwe
- Last T20I: 27 July 2013 v Pakistan

Domestic team information
- Years: Team
- 2009/10–present: Trinidad and Tobago
- 2010/11–2011/12: Sagicor High Performance Centre
- 2013: Barbados Tridents
- 2014: Trinidad and Tobago Red Steel
- 2015: Worcestershire
- 2015: St Lucia Zouks
- 2018: Trinbago Knight Riders
- 2019: Gloucestershire
- 2022: Yorkshire (squad no. 85)

Career statistics
| Competition | Test | ODI | FC | LA |
|---|---|---|---|---|
| Matches | 59 | 25 | 125 | 66 |
| Runs scored | 229 | 24 | 532 | 65 |
| Batting average | 4.24 | 3.42 | 5.11 | 5.00 |
| 100s/50s | 0/0 | 0/0 | 0/0 | 0/0 |
| Top score | 20* | 12* | 20* | 12* |
| Balls bowled | 9,379 | 1,148 | 17,910 | 2,818 |
| Wickets | 166 | 33 | 331 | 86 |
| Bowling average | 32.21 | 34.36 | 31.38 | 28.54 |
| 5 wickets in innings | 6 | 0 | 9 | 1 |
| 10 wickets in match | 1 | 0 | 1 | 0 |
| Best bowling | 8/62 | 3/17 | 8/62 | 5/33 |
| Catches/stumpings | 16/– | 1/– | 30/– | 3/– |
- Source: ESPNcricinfo, 29 August 2024

Shannon Terry Gabriel (born 28 April 1988) is a Trinidadian cricket right-arm fast bowler who played 59 Tests and 25 One Day Internationals (ODIs) for the West Indies from 2012 to 2023. He quickly became a key member of the Trinidad and Tobago attack after his debut in 2010. Following a neck injury to Ravi Rampaul, which forced him out of the match, Gabriel made his Test match debut for West Indies in May 2012, against England at Lord's. He made his ODI debut on 21 June 2016 against Australia. He is the first player to bat at No.12 in a Test match. On 28 August 2024, Gabriel announced his retirement from international cricket.

== Domestic career ==
Born 28 April 1988 in Trinidad and Tobago, Gabriel made his debut in first-class cricket on 29 January 2010 playing for Trinidad and Tobago against the Leeward Islands in the 2009–10 Regional Four Day Competition. Opening the bowling with Richard Kelly, Gabriel's first wicket was that of Mali Richards. He finished with two wickets for 46 runs in the match as Trinidad and Tobago won by 45 runs. Gabriel played two further first-class matches that season, finishing with four wickets at a cost of 39.75 runs each.

In June 2010, the West Indies Cricket Board founded the West Indies High Performance Centre to improve the quality of young cricketers in the region. Gabriel was included in the centre's first intake of 15 players aged 19 to 27. The centre fielded a team in the 2010/11 WICB Cup, the regional 50-over competition. He made his List A debut in the competition on 15 October, opening the bowling and taking two wickets for 30 runs against Guyana. He played two further matches in the 2010/11 Cup without taking another wicket.

In October 2018, Cricket West Indies (CWI) awarded him a red-ball contract for the 2018–19 season.

== International career ==
In his debut test match against England in May 2012, he took four wickets while conceding 86 runs in the match, with a good economy rate. However, during his debut Gabriel experienced pain in his back and bowled just five overs as England successfully chased 191 runs to win. He was sent home from the tour to rest the injury and Tino Best was called up in his place.

On 4 March 2017 against Pakistan, Gabriel took his second Test fifer, in the fourth innings of the match. West Indies provide a margin of 186 for the visitors to win the match and seal the series. However, from the very first ball, Gabriel started to swing the ball in and out of the batsman, where batting was extremely impossible for Pakistan. Finally, Pakistan all out for 81 runs, which is their lowest total against Windies and series levelled 1-1. Gabriel took 5 for just 11 runs and he won man of the match award as well.

=== Suspension ===
The England cricket team toured the West Indies at the start of 2019 to play three Tests, five ODIs and three T20I matches. Gabriel was not originally named in the West Indies' ODI squad, but was added to the team after injuries to Rovman Powell and Keemo Paul. However, during the third Test in February 2019, Gabriel was heard saying a homophobic remark towards England's captain Joe Root. As a result, the International Cricket Council (ICC) suspended Gabriel for four ODI matches.

=== Return ===
In April 2019, he was named in the West Indies' squad for the 2019 Cricket World Cup.

In September 2019, West Indies became the first team to bat with 12 players in an innings of a Test match where Gabriel became the first no 12 batsman to walk out in the middle.

In June 2020, Gabriel was named as one of eleven reserve players in the West Indies' Test squad, for their series against England. The Test series was originally scheduled to start in May 2020, but was moved back to July 2020 due to the COVID-19 pandemic. Following the conclusion of two practice matches, Gabriel was added to the West Indies' Test squad.

In December 2020, in the second match against New Zealand, Gabriel played in his 50th Test match.
