= Alzarri Joseph =

Antiguan cricketer (born 1996)

Personal information
- Full name: Alzarri Shaheim Joseph
- Born: 20 November 1996 (age 29); Antigua, Antigua and Barbuda
- Height: 6 ft 5 in (196 cm)
- Batting: Right-handed
- Bowling: Right-arm fast
- Role: Bowler

International information
- National side: West Indies (2016–present)
- Test debut (cap 309): 9 August 2016 v India
- Last Test: 2 July 2026 v Sri Lanka
- ODI debut (cap 173): 2 October 2016 v Pakistan
- Last ODI: 16 July 2026 v New Zealand
- ODI shirt no.: 8
- T20I debut (cap 91): 29 July 2022 v India
- Last T20I: 28 July 2025 v Australia
- T20I shirt no.: 8

Domestic team information
- Years: Team
- 2014–present: Leeward Islands
- 2016–2020: St Kitts and Nevis Patriots
- 2021–2025: St Lucia Kings
- 2019: Mumbai Indians
- 2021: Worcestershire
- 2022-2023: Gujarat Titans
- 2022-present: Fortune Barishal
- 2023: Joburg Super Kings
- 2024: Royal Challengers Bengaluru
- 2025: Peshawar Zalmi
- 2026: Quetta Gladiators
- 2026–: Antigua & Barbuda Falcons

Career statistics
Competition	Test	ODI	T20I	FC
Matches	42	86	45	77
Runs scored	804	497	129	1,489
Batting average	12.36	15.06	16.12	14.04
100s/50s	0/2	0/0	0/0	0/5
Top score	86	49	21*	89
Balls bowled	7024	4212	990	12,153
Wickets	130	138	62	249
Bowling average	33.56	27.89	24.59	28.64
5 wickets in innings	2	1	1	10
10 wickets in match	0	0	0	0
Best bowling	5/27	5/56	5/40	7/46
Catches/stumpings	18/–	25/–	13/–	30/–
- Source: ESPNcricinfo, 16 July 2026

Alzarri Shaheim Joseph (born 20 November 1996) is an Antiguan cricketer who plays for the West Indies in Tests, ODIs and T20Is. A right-arm fast bowler, he plays for Leeward Islands and the Antigua & Barbuda Falcons in West Indian domestic cricket. He also played for Royal Challengers Bengaluru in the Indian Premier League. In 2016, Joseph was named Antigua and Barbuda Sportsman of the Year award. During his under-19 career, Joseph helped the West Indies win the 2016 Under-19 Cricket World Cup.

== Domestic career ==
A West Indies under-19s player, Joseph made his first-class debut for the Leewards during the 2014–15 Regional Four Day Competition. Against Guyana during the following season, he took a maiden first-class five-wicket haul, 5/99 opening the bowling with Gavin Tonge. The following match, against the Windward Islands, he took another five-wicket haul, 7/46.

In December 2015, Joseph was named in the West Indies squad for the 2016 Under-19 World Cup, which they subsequently won. At the tournament, he took 13 wickets from six matches to finish as his team's leading wicket-taker (and equal third overall). His best performance was 4/30 against Zimbabwe, which saw him named man of the match.

In October 2019, he was named in the Leeward Islands' squad for the 2019–20 Regional Super50 tournament.

== International career ==
In July 2016 he was added to the West Indies Test squad for their series against India. He made his Test debut on 9 August 2016 in the third match of the series. He made his One Day International (ODI) debut for the West Indies against Pakistan on 2 October 2016.

In October 2018, Cricket West Indies (CWI) awarded him a contract across all formats of cricket for the 2018–19 season.

He received plaudits when, during the 2nd Test match against England in early 2019, Joseph carried on playing, in spite of the news after the 2nd day's play that his mother had died.

In June 2020, Joseph was named in the West Indies' Test squad, for their series against England. The Test series was originally scheduled to start in May 2020, but was moved back to July 2020 due to the COVID-19 pandemic.

Joseph scored his maiden Test fifty on 5 December 2020, scoring 86 runs in the second innings of a big loss against New Zealand. He was later named in Cricinfo's ODI team of 2020.

In June 2022, Joseph was named in the West Indies' Twenty20 International (T20I) squad for their series against Bangladesh. The following month, he was also named in the West Indies' T20I squad, this time for their series against India. He made his T20I debut on 29 July 2022, for the West Indies against India.

He was later named in ESPNcricinfo's best XI of the 2022 CPL along with the ICC's ODI team of 2022. On 28 March 2023, in the 3rd T20I against South Africa, Joseph took his maiden five-wicket haul in T20Is, helping his team to a 7-run victory.

In May 2024, he was named in the West Indies squad for the 2024 ICC Men's T20 World Cup tournament.

Joseph was given a two-match ban on 8 November 2024, as a result of incidents during West Indies T20I match against England two days earlier which included him arguing with captain Shai Hope and twice going off the playing area leaving his team with only 10 men on the field. The CWI Director of Cricket, Miles Bascombe, gave the following explanation for the ruling:

“Alzarri’s behavior did not align with the core values that Cricket West Indies upholds. Such conduct cannot be overlooked, and we have taken decisive action to ensure the gravity of the situation is fully acknowledged.”

Since then, Joseph has apologized publicly for what he did: “I recognize that my passion got the best of me,” he stated.

== T20 career ==
In March 2019, Joseph was selected for the Mumbai Indians as a replacement for Adam Milne in the Indian Premier League (IPL). On 6 April 2019, he made his IPL debut against the Sunrisers Hyderabad and took the figures of 6/12, the best bowling figures for a debutant, beating Andrew Tye's 5/17 in 2017. These were also the best bowling figures in the IPL, breaking the eleven-year-old record held by Sohail Tanvir (6/14) and the second best T20 bowling figures after Deepak Chahar (6/7). He also became only the second player to take a five-wicket haul on IPL debut, after Andrew Tye. His bowling figures remain the best in a T20 at the Rajiv Gandhi Stadium.

In July 2019, he was selected to play for the Amsterdam Knights in the inaugural edition of the Euro T20 Slam cricket tournament. However, the following month the tournament was cancelled. He was released by the Mumbai Indians ahead of the 2020 IPL auction. In July 2020, he was named in the St Kitts & Nevis Patriots squad for the 2020 Caribbean Premier League. He went unsold in the 2021 IPL auction. In February 2022, he was bought by the Gujarat Titans in the auction for the 2022 Indian Premier League tournament.
