= Rovman Powell =

Jamaican cricketer (born 1993)

Rovman Powell OD
Personal information
- Born: 23 July 1993 (age 33); Kingston, Jamaica
- Nickname: Knight
- Batting: Right-handed
- Bowling: Right-arm medium-fast
- Role: Middle-order batter

International information
- National side: West Indies (2016–present)
- ODI debut (cap 177): 16 November 2016 v Sri Lanka
- Last ODI: 27 July 2023 v India
- T20I debut (cap 66): 26 March 2017 v Pakistan
- Last T20I: 13 November 2025 v New Zealand

Domestic team information
- Years: Team
- 2014/15–2015/16: Combined Campuses
- 2015/16–present: Jamaica
- 2016–2022: Jamaica Tallawahs
- 2021, 2023–2024: Peshawar Zalmi
- 2022–2023: Delhi Capitals
- 2023/24–2025/26: Dubai Capitals
- 2023–present: Barbados Royals
- 2024: Rajasthan Royals
- 2024: Trent Rockets
- 2025: Kolkata Knight Riders
- 2025–present: Los Angeles Knight Riders
- 2026: Paarl Royals

Career statistics
Competition	ODI	T20I	FC	LA
Matches	51	107	13	119
Runs scored	979	2,068	383	3164
Batting average	21.75	25.85	15.95	30.71
100s/50s	1/2	1/9	–/1	4/17
Top score	101	107	71	106
Balls bowled	280	131	1139	1395
Wickets	3	5	25	35
Bowling average	91.66	43.40	23.6	38.71
5 wickets in innings	–	–	1	1
10 wickets in match	–	–	–	–
Best bowling	1/7	2/31	5/23	5/36
Catches/stumpings	16/–	53/–	6/–	44/–
- Source: ESPNcricinfo, 13 November 2025

Rovman Powell (born 23 July 1993) is a Jamaican cricketer who plays for the West Indies cricket team and is former captain in Twenty20 Internationals. In December 2018, he captained the West Indies for the first time in a One Day International (ODI) match against Bangladesh. Domestically, he has played for Jamaica, the Combined Campuses and Colleges, and the Jamaica Tallawahs.

== Early life ==
Powell was born on 23 July 1993 in Kingston, Jamaica. He grew up in the Bannister area of Old Harbour Bay with his mother Joan Plumar and younger sister; his father abandoned his mother before he was born.

Powell grew up in relative poverty, looking after his sister as his mother worked multiple jobs. He attended Old Harbour High School, also working as a goat-herder for a period of time. He later won a sports scholarship to the University of the West Indies, where he studied geography and social studies.

== Domestic career ==
Powell made his List A debut in January 2015, playing for the Combined Campuses against Guyana in the 2014–15 Regional Super50. He took 3/20 and scored 31 runs on debut, and was named man of the match. Powell made his first-class debut in the 2015–16 Regional Four Day Competition, playing for Jamaica against Guyana. For the 2015–16 Regional Super50, he returned to the Combined Campuses. In his team's final two matches, he scored twin half-centuries, 71 against the Windward Islands and 63 not out against Guyana. He played a key role in Jamaica's march to the final of the 2016-17 Regional Super50. In the semi-final against Trinidad and Tobago, he smashed 95 runs from 45 balls (including 9 sixes and 6 fours), before taking 5-36; these were both career-best List A performances, leading to him being named man-of-the-match. He was then selected by the Jamaica Tallawahs in the 6th round of the 2017 CPL player draft.

In October 2018, Cricket West Indies (CWI) awarded him a white-ball contract for the 2018–19 season. In October 2019, he was named as the captain of Jamaica's squad for the 2019–20 Regional Super50 tournament. He was the leading run-scorer for Jamaica in the tournament, with 412 runs in eight matches.

== T20 franchise career ==
In February 2017, he was bought by the Kolkata Knight Riders team for the 2017 Indian Premier League for 30 lakhs.

In October 2018, he was named in the squad for the Dhaka Dynamites team, following the draft for the 2018–19 Bangladesh Premier League. In July 2020, he was named in the Jamaica Tallawahs squad for the 2020 Caribbean Premier League. In April 2021, he was signed by Peshawar Zalmi to play in the rescheduled matches in the 2021 Pakistan Super League. In November 2021, he was selected to play for the Kandy Warriors following the players' draft for the 2021 Lanka Premier League.

In February 2022, he was bought by the Delhi Capitals for the 2022 Indian Premier League tournament and retained for the 2023 season.

After being released by the Delhi Capitals ahead of the 2024 Indian Premier League season, Powell was purchased by the Rajasthan Royals for 7.4 crores during the IPL 2024 auction.

== International career ==
He made his One Day International (ODI) debut in the second match of the tri-series, against Sri Lanka. He made his Twenty20 International (T20I) debut for the West Indies against Pakistan on 26 March 2017. In February 2018, the International Cricket Council (ICC) named Powell as one of the ten players to watch ahead of the 2018 Cricket World Cup Qualifier tournament. Following the conclusion of the Cricket World Cup Qualifier tournament, the ICC named Powell as the rising star of the West Indies' squad. When the West Indies toured Bangladesh in December 2018, he was named as captain of the ODI squad of West Indies.

In January 2022, in the third match against England, Powell scored his first century in T20I cricket, with 107 runs from 53 balls.

In 2023, Powell was made captain of West Indies T20i team replacing Nicholas Pooran after their disappointing ICC T20 WC2022 campaign. Under his captaincy, team has played 3 bilateral series winning all three i.e. 2-1 v SA, 3-2 v IND, 3-2 v ENG.

In 2024, Powell was drafted by Trent Rockets to play in The Hundred. In May 2024, he was named captain of the West Indies squad for the 2024 ICC Men's T20 World Cup tournament.

== Honours, awards and recognition ==
=== National honours ===
- Jamaica:
  - Order of Distinction (Officer)
