= Devendra Bishoo =

Guyanese cricketer

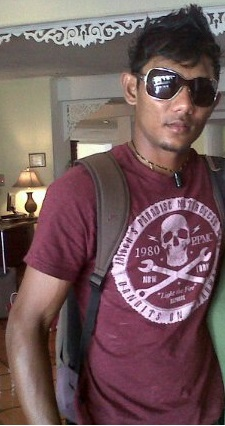

Personal information
- Full name: Devendra Bishoo
- Born: 6 November 1985 (age 41); New Amsterdam, Guyana
- Batting: Left-handed
- Bowling: Right-arm leg break
- Role: Bowler

International information
- National side: West Indies (2011–2019)
- Test debut (cap 289): 12 May 2011 v Pakistan
- Last Test: 30 November 2018 v Bangladesh
- ODI debut (cap 157): 17 March 2011 v England
- Last ODI: 2 March 2019 v England
- T20I debut (cap 43): 21 April 2011 v Pakistan
- Last T20I: 10 March 2019 v England

Domestic team information
- Years: Team
- 2007–2020: Guyana

Career statistics
| Competition | Test | ODI | FC | LA |
|---|---|---|---|---|
| Matches | 36 | 42 | 103 | 81 |
| Runs scored | 707 | 164 | 1,685 | 322 |
| Batting average | 15.36 | 10.93 | 12.48 | 12.38 |
| 100s/50s | 0/0 | 0/0 | 0/0 | 0/1 |
| Top score | 45 | 29* | 47* | 52* |
| Balls bowled | 8,067 | 2,022 | 21,901 | 4,077 |
| Wickets | 117 | 38 | 387 | 109 |
| Bowling average | 37.18 | 43.89 | 28.96 | 27.80 |
| 5 wickets in innings | 4 | 0 | 20 | 1 |
| 10 wickets in match | 1 | 0 | 4 | 0 |
| Best bowling | 8/49 | 3/30 | 9/78 | 6/36 |
| Catches/stumpings | 20/– | 7/– | 52/– | 16/– |
- Source: ESPNcricinfo, 13 January 2025

Devendra Bishoo (born 6 November 1985) is a Guyanese former cricketer, who plays all formats of the game for West Indies. He is a leg-spinner who made his international debut for the West Indies in the 2011 Cricket World Cup.

Bishoo was named as ICC Emerging Player of the Year in 2011, but lost his place in the team through a combination of loss of form and competition brought on by Sunil Narine and Shane Shillingford.

== Domestic career ==
Bishoo is a leg spinner who has risen through the ranks since his debut in the 2008 season. He cut his teeth at the first-class level and courted immediate success, snaring four five-wicket hauls, and ten in one match, in his first couple of seasons.

His attacking style of bowling had a major impact in the 2010 Caribbean T20 where he finished with ten wickets in four games at the mean average of 8.20, conceding just 5.12 runs an over. He was named in West Indies A team for unofficial test tour to India in September 2013.

In October 2018, Cricket West Indies (CWI) awarded him a red-ball contract for the 2018–19 season.

== International career ==
Bishoo was a replacement for the injured Dwayne Bravo at the World Cup in Bangladesh, India and Sri Lanka from 19 February to 2 April 2011. He made his international debut against England at Chennai on 17 March, taking 3/34 in his 10 overs. Bishoo adapted his bowling to the slow pitches of the Indian subcontinent, reducing the pace of his stock delivery and introducing variations of speed.

Bishoo played his first Twenty20 International match against Pakistan at St.Lucia. He put in a match-winning performance of 4/17 in 4 overs taking the Man of the Match award as West Indies won by 7 runs.

When Australia visited in March 2012, the selectors rested Bishoo for the ODI series. It was hoped that he would be more effective in the Tests if the Australian batsmen were not allowed to get used to his bowling. In the event he played just one Test, conceding 169 runs for a solitary wicket, and was replaced by off-spinner Shane Shillingford. Rather than accompanying the West Indies on their tour of England in May 2012, it was felt that Bishoo would be better off accompanying West Indies A in India to regain confidence.

On 16 October 2016, Bishoo took 8 wickets in a match against Pakistan. This was the second best figures by any West Indian spinner and the best by a leg-spinner. He took 10 wickets for 174 in that match, and it was his first 10 wicket haul in Tests. This is also the best bowling performance by any visiting bowler in Asian sub-continent.

Devendra Bishoo also set the record for becoming the first ever bowler to take 10 wicket haul in a day night test match and was also the only spinner as well as a legspinner to achieve this milestone. He was also the first bowler to take a 7 wicket haul as well as an 8 wicket haul in an innings of a day/night test match. He was also the only spinner to take a 6 wicket haul in an innings of a day/night test match.

| Preceded by Steven Finn | Emerging Player of the Year; 2011 | Succeeded by Sunil Narine |
