= Ashley Nurse =

Barbadian cricketer

Personal information
- Full name: Ashley Renaldo Nurse
- Born: 22 December 1988 (age 37); Christ Church, Barbados
- Batting: Right-handed
- Bowling: Right-arm off-break
- Role: All-rounder

International information
- National side: West Indies (2011–2019)
- ODI debut (cap 176): 16 November 2016 v Sri Lanka
- Last ODI: 22 June 2019 v New Zealand
- ODI shirt no.: 5
- T20I debut (cap 45): 21 April 2011 v Pakistan
- Last T20I: 8 March 2019 v England
- T20I shirt no.: 5

Domestic team information
- Years: Team
- 2007–present: Barbados (squad no. 5)
- 2018: Montreal Tigers

Career statistics
Competition	ODI	T20I	FC	LA
Matches	54	13	52	119
Runs scored	502	85	1,373	1,077
Batting average	19.30	21.81	21.79	17.65
100s/50s	0/0	0/0	1/4	0/1
Top score	44	20*	130*	57
Balls bowled	2,384	240	7,741	5,298
Wickets	49	8	162	154
Bowling average	43.36	39.75	24.08	27.51
5 wickets in innings	0	0	4	1
10 wickets in match	0	0	2	0
Best bowling	4/51	2/6	7/10	6/29
Catches/stumpings	15/–	6/–	82/–	62/–
Medal record
Men's Cricket
Representing West Indies
ICC Men's T20 World Cup
Winner	2016 India
- Source: ESPNCricinfo, 5 October 2021

Ashley Renaldo Nurse (born 22 December 1988) is a Barbadian former cricketer who plays first-class, List A and Twenty20 cricket for Barbados. He is a right-arm off-break bowler and a right-handed batsman. Nurse was a member of the West Indies team that won the 2016 T20 World Cup.

== International career ==
Nurse made his Twenty20 International debut for West Indies against Pakistan on April 21, 2011, where he bowled four overs without picking up any wickets and conceded 33 runs. In his second appearance, against India, he had more impressive figures of 4-0-23-0.

An economical bowler, Nurse made his One Day International (ODI) debut in the second match of the tri-series, against Sri Lanka.

== Domestic career ==
In July 2017, he was named Regional Limited-Overs Cricketer of the Year by the West Indies Players' Association.

In October 2018, Cricket West Indies (CWI) awarded him a white-ball contract for the 2018–19 season. In April 2019, he was named in the West Indies' squad for the 2019 Cricket World Cup. In October 2019, he was selected to play for Barbados in the 2019–20 Regional Super50 tournament. He was the leading wicket-taker for Barbados in the tournament, with 19 dismissals in nine matches.

In July 2020, he was named in the Barbados Tridents squad for the 2020 Caribbean Premier League.
