= 2008–09 WICB Cup =

Cricket tournament

- Dates: 13 November – 23 November 2008
- Administrator: WICB
- Cricket format: List A (50 overs)
- Tournament format(s): Group stage, finals
- Champions: Trinidad and Tobago

The 2008–09 WICB President's Cup was the 35th edition of the Regional Super50, the domestic limited-overs cricket competition for the countries of the West Indies Cricket Board (WICB).

== Squads ==
Barbados	Canada	(Cricket West Indies) Combined Campuses	Guyana
Jason Haynes (c); Tino Best; Patrick Browne (wicket keeper); Jonathan Carter; Nikolai Charles; Pedro Collins; Corey Collymore; Ryan Hinds; Alcindo Holder; Dale Richards; Dwayne Smith; Kevin Stoute; Kenroy Williams; Dwayne Yearwood	Sunil Dhaniram (c); Umar Bhatti; Harvir Baidwan; Karun Jethi; Sandeep Jyoti; Eion Katchay; Khurram Chohan; Mohammad Iqbal; Ashif Mulla; Henry Osinde; Qaiser Ali; Abdool Samad (wicket keeper); Zahid Hussain	Simon Jackson (c); Khismar Catlin; Ramnarine Chattergoon; Romel Currency; Kavesh Kantasingh; Kirk Edwards; Craig Emmanuel; Carlitos Lopez; Gilford Moore; Floyd Reifer; Anderson Sealy; Jamal Smith; Chadwick Walton; Kurt Wilkinson	Christopher Barnwell; Brandon Bess; Rajendra Chandrika; Derwin Christian (wicket keeper); Royston Crandon; Narsingh Deonarine; Travis Dowlin; Dion Ferrier; Assad Fudadin; Trevon Garraway; Steven Jacobs; Mahendra Nagamootoo; Veerasammy Permaul; Gajanand Singh
Jamaica	Leeward Islands	Trinidad and Tobago	United States of America
Tamar Lambert (c); David Bernard; Devon Brown; Yannick Elliot; Keith Hibbert; Danza Hyatt; Lorenzo Ingram; Horace Miller; Brenton Parchment; Andrew Richardson; Andre Russell; Krishmar Santokie; Donovan Sinclair; Gavin Wallace	Runako Morton (c); Justin Athanaze; Omari Banks; Wilden Cornwall; Chad Hampson; Shane Jeffers; Anthony Martin; Orlando Peters; Kieran Powell; Austin Richards; Devon Thomas; Gavin Tonge; Kelbert Walters; Tonito Willett	Daren Ganga (c); Samuel Badree; Rishi Bachan; Adrian Barath; Darren Bravo; Rayad Emrit; Sherwin Ganga; Amit Jaggernauth; Richard Kelly; Gibran Mohammed (wicket keeper); William Perkins; Kieron Pollard; Ravi Rampaul; Lendl Simmons	Steve Massiah (c); Orlando Baker; Timroy Allen; Barrington Bartley; Robert Cresser; Sudesh Dhaniram; Akeem Dodson (wicket keeper); Dennis Evans; Imran Awan; Abhijit Joshi; Kumar Nandalal; Gowkaran Roopnarine; Aditya Thyagarajan; Carl Wright (wicket keeper)
Windward Islands
Rawl Lewis (c); Miles Bascombe; Alston Bobb; Deighton Butler; Johnson Charles; Denis George; Kevin James; Lindon James (wicket keeper); Mervin Matthew; Darren Sammy; Liam Sebastien; Shane Shillingford; Devon Smith

== Group stage ==
13 November 2008
Scorecard

Barbados; 249/5 (50 overs)	v	Jamaica; 228 (48.3 overs)

Barbados won by 21 runs
Bourda, Georgetown
Player of the match: Ryan Hinds (Barbados)

- Kenroy Williams (Barbados), Horace Miller and Yannick Elliot (Jamaica) made their List A debuts.

13 November 2008
Scorecard

Leeward Islands; 367/4 (50 overs)	v	Canada; 183/7 (50 overs)

Leeward won by 184 runs
Everest Cricket Club Ground, Georgetown
Player of the match: Austin Richards (Leeward Islands)

- Anthony Martin and Chad Hampson (Leeward Islands) made their List A debuts.

13 November 2008
Scorecard

(Cricket West Indies) Combined Campuses; 250/6 (50 overs)	v	Guyana; 252/6 (48.3 overs)

Guyana won by 4 wickets
Providence Stadium, Georgetown
Player of the match: Romel Currency (Combined Campuses)

- Chris Barnwell, Trevon Garraway (Guyana) and Gilford Moore (Combined Campuses) made their List A debuts.

14 November 2008
Scorecard

Barbados; 288/8 (50 overs)	v	United States; 149/9 (42 overs)

Barbados won by 109 runs (D/L method)
Providence Stadium, Georgetown
Player of the match: Ryan Hinds (Barbados)

- Nikolai Charles (Barbados), Carl Wright, Orlando Baker, Aditya Thyagarajan, Dennis Evans, Akeem Dodson, Robert Cresser, Timroy Allen, Kumar Nandalal (United States) made their List A debuts.

14 November 2008
Scorecard

(Cricket West Indies) Combined Campuses; 224/6 (50 overs)	v	Windward Islands; 154 (46.2 overs)

Combined Campuses won by 70 runs
Enmore Recreation Ground, Enmore, Guyana
Player of the match: Anderson Sealy (Combined Campuses)

- Anderson Sealy (Combined Campuses), Johnson Charles, and Kevin James (Windward Islands) made their List A debuts.

14 November 2008
Scorecard

Leeward Islands; 219 (42.5 overs)	v	Trinidad and Tobago; 221/1 (32.5 overs)

Trinidad and Tobago won by 9 wickets
Bourda, Georgetown
Player of the match: Lendl Simmons (Trinidad and Tobago)

15 November 2008
Scorecard

Canada	v	Trinidad and Tobago

Match abandoned without a ball bowled
Uitvlugt Community Centre Ground, Guyana

15 November 2008
Scorecard

Guyana; 170 (26.2 overs)	v	Windward Islands; 174/7 (26.4 overs)

Windward won by 3 wickets
Blairmont Sports Club Ground, Guyana
Player of the match: Liam Sebastien (Windward Islands)

- Gajanand Singh (Guyana) made his List A debut

15 November 2008
Scorecard

Jamaica	v	United States

Match abandoned without a ball bowled
Everest Cricket Club Ground, Georgetown

17 November 2008
Scorecard

Leeward Islands; 172 (50 overs)	v	Barbados; 110 (31.2 overs)

Leeward won by 62 runs
Uitvlugt Community Centre Ground, Guyana
Player of the match: Omari Banks (Leeward Islands)

- Orlando Peters (Guyana) made his List A debut.

17 November 2008
Scorecard

Canada; 104 (36.5 overs)	v	Jamaica; 110 (20.5 overs)

Jamaica won by 9 wickets
Bourda, Georgetown
Player of the match: Andrew Richardson (Jamaica)

- Gavin Wallace (Jamaica) made his List A debut.

17 November 2008
Scorecard

United States; 186/7 (50 overs)	v	Trinidad and Tobago; 187/4 (38 overs)

Trinidad and Tobago won by 6 wickets
Enmore Recreation Ground, Georgetown
Player of the match: Carl Wright (United States)

- Greg Sewdial (United States) made his List A debut.

18 November 2008
Scorecard

Barbados; 197/8 (50 overs)	v	Windward Islands; 184 (49.3 overs)

Barbados won by 13 runs
Enmore Recreation Ground, Enmore, Georgetown
Player of the match: Corey Collymore (Barbados)

18 November 2008
Scorecard

United States; 127/8 (27 overs)	v	(Cricket West Indies) Combined Campuses; 128/4 (24.3 overs)

Barbados won by 13 runs
Everest Cricket Club Ground, Georgetown
Player of the match: Kavesh Kantasingh (Combined Campuses)

18 November 2008
Scorecard

Guyana; 179 (49 overs)	v	Jamaica; 143 (45 overs)

Jamaica won by 36 runs
Providence Stadium, Georgetown
Player of the match: Lorenzo Ingram (Jamaica)

19 November 2008
Scorecard

Trinidad and Tobago; 282/9 (50 overs)	v	(Cricket West Indies) Combined Campuses; 197 (45.4 overs)

Trinidad and Tobago won by 85 runs
Bourda, Georgetown
Player of the match: Kieron Pollard (Trinidad and Tobago)

19 November 2008
Scorecard

Canada; 164/4 (50 overs)	v	Guyana; 168/3 (36.2 overs)

Guyana won by 7 wickets
Providence Stadium, Georgetown
Player of the match: Steven Jacobs (Guyana)

19 November 2008
Scorecard

Leeward Islands; 172 (48.4 overs)	v	Windward Islands; 102 (43.1 overs)

Guyana won by 7 wickets
Uitvlugt Community Centre Ground, West Demerara, Guyana
Player of the match: Devon Thomas (Leeward Islands)

== Knock Outs ==
=== Semi-finals ===
21 November 2008
Scorecard

Jamaica; 197/8 (50 overs)	v	Trinidad and Tobago; 200/7 (47 overs)

Trinidad and Tobago won by 3 wickets
Providence Stadium, Guyana
Player of the match: Kieron Pollard (Trinidad and Tobago)

22 November 2008
Scorecard

Barbados; 295/5 (50 overs)	v	Leeward Islands; 127 (37.4 overs)

Barbados won by 168 runs
Providence Stadium, Guyana
Player of the match: Dwayne Smith (Barbados)

- Dwayne Yearwood (Barbados) made his List A debut.

=== Final ===
23 November 2008
Scorecard

Barbados; 142 (45.5 overs)	v	Trinidad and Tobago; 143/3 (27 overs)

Trinidad and Tobago won by 7 wickets
Providence Stadium, Guyana
Player of the match: Samuel Badree (Trinidad and Tobago)

== Statistics ==
=== Most runs ===
The top five run scorers (total runs) are included in this table.

Player	Team	Runs	Inns	Avg	Highest	100s	50s
Dwayne Smith	Barbados	283	6	56.60	82	0	3
Ryan Hinds	Barbados	273	6	45.50	84	0	4
Romel Currency	(Cricket West Indies) Combined Campuses	260	4	86.66	102*	1	2
Austin Richards	Leeward Islands	226	5	45.20	141	1	0
Lendl Simmons	Trinidad and Tobago	215	5	71.66	112*	1	0

Source: [Cricinfo]

=== Most wickets ===
The top five wicket takers are listed in this table, listed by wickets taken and then by bowling average.

Player	Team	Overs	Wkts	Ave	SR	Econ	BBI
Liam Sebastien	Windward Islands	32.0	11	13.00	17.4	4.46	5/28
Samuel Badree	Trinidad and Tobago	48.0	10	12.70	28.8	2.64	3/14
Dwayne Smith	Barbados	42.0	10	17.00	25.2	4.04	3/16
Kieron Pollard	Trinidad and Tobago	24.0	9	14.22	16.00	5.33	3/38
Omari Banks	Leeward Islands	43.0	9	18.44	28.6	3.86	4/51

Source: [ Cricinfo]
