= 2012–13 Caribbean Twenty20 =

- Administrator(s): WICB
- Cricket format: Twenty20
- Tournament format(s): Round-robin and playoffs
- Host(s): West Indies
- Champions: Trinidad and Tobago (3rd title)
- Participants: 7
- Matches: 23
- Player of the series: Darren Bravo (Trinidad and Tobago)
- Most runs: Christopher Barnwell (245)
- Most wickets: Tino Best (10)
- Official website: ct20.windiescricket.com

The 2012–13 Caribbean Twenty20 was the fourth season of the Caribbean Twenty20, a domestic Twenty20 tournament administered by the West Indies Cricket Board. 23 matches were played from 6 to 20 January 2013. This was the first season to feature only the seven West Indies first-class teams and no invited overseas teams.

Trinidad and Tobago won their third successive title. They also qualified for the 2013 Champions League Twenty20.

== Venues ==
All matches were played at the following two grounds:

Port of Spain, Trinidad	Gros Islet, Saint Lucia
Queen's Park Oval	Beausejour Stadium
Capacity: 25,000	Capacity: 20,000
2012–13 Caribbean Twenty20 is located in Caribbean

== Format ==
The format was the changed from the previous seasons. The tournament consisted of 23 matches, divided into a group stage and a playoff stage. The group stage consisted of one group instead of the previous two, with each the teams playing a round-robin tournament. The second and third placed teams played in the playoff. The final was played between the first placed team from the group stage and the winner of the playoff. If a match ended in a tie, a Super Over would have been played to determine the winner.

Points in the group stage were awarded as follows:

Points
Results	Points
Win	4 points
No result	1 point
Loss	0 points

== Teams and standings ==
Pos	Team	Pld	W	L	NR	Pts	NRR
1	Trinidad and Tobago	6	5	0	1	21	2.695
2	Jamaica	6	4	1	1	17	−0.087
3	Guyana	6	4	2	0	16	−0.291
4	(Cricket West Indies) Windward Islands	6	3	3	0	12	0.205
5	Barbados	6	2	4	0	8	0.174
6	(Cricket West Indies) Combined Campuses and Colleges	6	1	5	0	4	−0.668
7	(Cricket West Indies) Leeward Islands	6	1	5	0	4	−1.597

== Fixtures ==
All times shown are in Eastern Caribbean Time (UTC−04:00).

=== Group stage ===
6 January
20:00 (D/N)
Scorecard

Trinidad and Tobago; 128/9 (20 overs)	v	Jamaica; 5/0 (1.2 overs)
Dwayne Bravo 30 (27); Krishmar Santokie 2/17 (4 overs)		Nkrumah Bonner 4* (6)

No result
Queen's Park Oval, Port of Spain, Trinidad
Umpires: Gregory Brathwaite and Nigel Duguid

- Trinidad and Tobago won the toss and elected to bat.

7 January
16:00 (D/N)
Scorecard

Leeward Islands (Cricket West Indies); 87 (17.3 overs)	v	Barbados; 91/1 (8.2 overs)
Chesney Hughes 34 (23); Tino Best 4/26 (4 overs)		Justin Brathwaite 42 (16); Justin Athanaze 1/13 (2.2 overs)

Barbados won by 9 wickets
Queen's Park Oval, Port of Spain, Trinidad
Umpires: Verdayne Smith and Joel Wilson
Player of the match: Tino Best (Barbados)

- Leeward Islands won the toss and elected to bat.

7 January
20:00 (D/N)
Scorecard

Combined Campuses and Colleges (Cricket West Indies); 159/3 (20 overs)	v	Guyana; 160/8 (20 overs)
Chadwick Walton 99* (66); Devendra Bishoo 1/23 (4 overs)		Narsingh Deonarine 57 (40); Raymon Reifer 4/32 (4 overs)

Guyana won by 2 wickets
Queen's Park Oval, Port of Spain, Trinidad
Umpires: Patrick Gustard and Peter Nero
Player of the match: Chadwick Walton (CCC)

- Guyana won the toss and elected to field.

8 January
16:00 (D/N)
Scorecard

Jamaica; 72 (17.3 overs)	v	Barbados; 74/5 (11.2 overs)
Nkrumah Bonner 21 (19); Carlos Brathwaite 4/23 (4 overs)		Justin Brathwaite 23 (10); Krishmar Santokie 2/14 (3 overs)

Barbados won by 5 wickets
Queen's Park Oval, Port of Spain, Trinidad
Umpires: Peter Nero and Joel Wilson
Player of the match: Carlos Brathwaite (Barbados)

- Jamaica won the toss and elected to bat.

8 January
20:00 (D/N)
Scorecard

Combined Campuses and Colleges (Cricket West Indies); 94/8 (20 overs)	v	Trinidad and Tobago; 98/3 (17.2 overs)
Chadwick Walton 19 (23); Kevon Cooper 3/17 (3 overs)		Dwayne Bravo 36* (42); Kevin McClean 1/9 (2 overs)

Trinidad and Tobago won by 7 wickets
Queen's Park Oval, Port of Spain, Trinidad
Umpires: Nigel Duguid and Leslie Reifer
Player of the match: Dwayne Bravo (T&T)

- Trinidad and Tobago won the toss and elected to field.

9 January
16:00 (D/N)
Scorecard

Jamaica; 116/6 (17 overs)	v	(Cricket West Indies) Windward Islands; 104/9 (17 overs)
Danza Hyatt 44 (33); Garey Mathurin 2/18 (4 overs)		Andre Fletcher 26 (34); Tamar Lambert 3/10 (2 overs)

Jamaica won by 12 runs
Queen's Park Oval, Port of Spain, Trinidad
Umpires: Gregory Brathwaite and Nandkumar Shivsankar
Player of the match: Tamar Lambert (Jamaica)

- Windward Islands won the toss and elected to field.
- Rain reduced the match to 17 overs per side.

9 January
20:00 (D/N)
Scorecard

Trinidad and Tobago; 187/4 (20 overs)	v	(Cricket West Indies) Leeward Islands; 92/8 (20 overs)
Darren Bravo 65* (40); Tonito Willett 2/18 (4 overs)		Chesney Hughes 20 (22); Kieron Pollard 2/6 (2 overs)

Trinidad and Tobago won by 95 runs
Queen's Park Oval, Port of Spain, Trinidad
Umpires: Nigel Duguid and Leslie Reifer
Player of the match: Lendl Simmons (T&T)

- Leeward Islands won the toss and elected to field.

10 January
16:00 (D/N)
Scorecard

Windward Islands (Cricket West Indies); 129/7 (20 overs)	v	(Cricket West Indies) Combined Campuses and Colleges; 87 (18.5 overs)
Keddy Lesporis 33 (25); Raymon Reifer 2/14 (2 overs)		Raymon Reifer 17 (18); Darren Sammy 3/17 (3.5 overs)

Windward Islands won by 42 runs
Queen's Park Oval, Port of Spain, Trinidad
Umpires: Nigel Duguid and Leslie Reifer
Player of the match: Darren Sammy (WI)

- Combined Campuses and Colleges won the toss and elected to field.

10 January
20:00 (D/N)
Scorecard

Guyana; 108 (19 overs)	v	Barbados; 66 (17.2 overs)
Shivnarine Chanderpaul 23 (27); Dwayne Smith 2/14 (3 overs)		Shane Dowrich 18 (25); Christopher Barnwell 2/11 (3 overs)

Guyana won by 42 runs
Queen's Park Oval, Port of Spain, Trinidad
Umpires: Peter Nero and Verdayne Smith
Player of the match: Steven Jacobs (Guyana)

- Barbados won the toss and elected to field.

11 January
16:00 (D/N)
Scorecard

Jamaica; 110/8 (20 overs)	v	(Cricket West Indies) Leeward Islands; 110/5 (20 overs)
Danza Hyatt 39 (36); Rahkeem Cornwall 3/10 (4 overs)		Rahkeem Cornwall 28* (15); Odean Brown 2/10 (4 overs)

Scores level; Jamaica won the Super Over
Queen's Park Oval, Port of Spain, Trinidad
Umpires: Peter Nero and Nandkumar Shivsankar
Player of the match: Rahkeem Cornwall (LI)

- Jamaica won the toss and elected to bat.

11 January
20:00 (D/N)
Scorecard

Combined Campuses and Colleges (Cricket West Indies); 111/8 (20 overs)	v	Barbados; 99/9 (20 overs)
Floyd Reifer 37 (35); Tino Best 4/19 (4 overs)		Kyle Mayers 34 (35); Derone Davis 4/5 (4 overs)

Combined Campuses and Colleges won by 12 runs
Queen's Park Oval, Port of Spain, Trinidad
Umpires: Patrick Gustard and Joel Wilson
Player of the match: Derone Davis (CCC)

- Combined Campuses and Colleges win the toss and elected to bat.

12 January
16:00 (D/N)
Scorecard

Windward Islands (Cricket West Indies); 111/8 (20 overs)	v	(Cricket West Indies) Leeward Islands; 101/9 (20 overs)
Miles Bascombe 29 (31); Chesney Hughes 2/8 (3 overs)		Justin Athanaze 24 (15); Liam Sebastien 4/17 (4 overs)

Windward Islands won by 10 runs
Queen's Park Oval, Port of Spain, Trinidad
Umpires: Nigel Duguid and Verdayne Smith
Player of the match: Liam Sebastien (WI)

- Windward Islands won the toss and elected to bat.

12 January
20:00 (D/N)
Scorecard

Trinidad and Tobago; 191/4 (20 overs)	v	Guyana; 111/6 (20 overs)
Darren Bravo 82* (51); Christopher Barnwell 2/29 (4 overs)		Shivnarine Chanderpaul 53 (50); Rayad Emrit 2/18 (4 overs)

Trinidad and Tobago won by 80 runs
Queen's Park Oval, Port of Spain, Trinidad
Umpires: Gregory Brathwaite and Leslie Reifer
Player of the match: Darren Bravo (T&T)

- Guyana won the toss and elected to field.

15 January
16:00 (D/N)
Scorecard

Guyana; 93 (19.4 overs)	v	Jamaica; 94/5 (18.1 overs)
Christopher Barnwell 27 (25); Andre Russell 4/22 (4 overs)		Krishmar Santokie 22 (25); Narsingh Deonarine 2/8 (2 overs)

Jamaica won by 5 wickets
Beausejour Stadium, Gros Islet, St Lucia
Umpires: Leslie Reifer and Joel Wilson
Player of the match: Andre Russell (Jamaica)

- Jamaica won the toss and elected to field.

15 January
20:00 (D/N)
Scorecard

Windward Islands (Cricket West Indies); 125/6 (20 overs)	v	Trinidad and Tobago; 126/2 (16.2 overs)
Keddy Lesporis 31 (33); Samuel Badree 2/15 (4 overs)		Dwayne Bravo 62* (42); Darren Sammy 1/20 (3 overs)

Trinidad and Tobago won by 8 wickets
Beausejour Stadium, Gros Islet, St Lucia
Umpires: Gregory Brathwaite and Verdayne Smith
Player of the match: Dwayne Bravo (T&T)

- Windward Islands won the toss and elected to bat.

16 January
16:00 (D/N)
Scorecard

Leeward Islands (Cricket West Indies); 127 (19.4 overs)	v	(Cricket West Indies) Combined Campuses and Colleges; 123/8 (20 overs)
Justin Athanaze 31 (17); Akeem Dewar 3/15 (4 overs)		Floyd Reifer 25 (22); Rahkeem Cornwall 1/11 (2 overs)

Leeward Islands won by 4 runs
Beausejour Stadium, Gros Islet, St Lucia
Umpires: Patrick Gustard and Peter Nero
Player of the match: Justin Athanaze (LI)

- Combined Campuses and Colleges won the toss and elected to field.

16 January
20:00 (D/N)
Scorecard

Barbados; 101/6 (20 overs)	v	Trinidad and Tobago; 102/5 (15.1 overs)
Ashley Nurse 24* (19); Rayad Emrit 2/14 (4 overs)		Lendl Simmons 36 (23); Dwayne Smith 1/14 (3 overs)

Trinidad and Tobago won by 5 wickets
Beausejour Stadium, Gros Islet, St Lucia
Umpires: Nigel Duguid and Nandkumar Shivsankar
Player of the match: Rayad Emrit (T&T)

- Barbados won the toss and elected to bat.

17 January
16:00 (D/N)
Scorecard

Guyana; 156/3 (20 overs)	v	(Cricket West Indies) Leeward Islands; 142/5 (20 overs)
Christopher Barnwell 61* (36); Chesney Hughes 2/21 (4 overs)		Devon Thomas 46* (27); Royston Crandon 1/12 (3 overs)

Guyana won by 14 runs
Beausejour Stadium, Gros Islet, St Lucia
Umpires: Gregory Brathwaite and Leslie Reifer
Player of the match: Christopher Barnwell (Guyana)

- Guyana won the toss and elected to bat.

17 January
20:00 (D/N)
Scorecard

Barbados; 140/7 (20 overs)	v	(Cricket West Indies) Windward Islands; 142/6 (19 overs)
Kyle Mayers 37 (21); Shane Shillingford 2/29 (4 overs)		Darren Sammy 41 (28); Dwayne Smith 3/27 (4 overs)

Windward Islands won by 4 wickets
Beausejour Stadium, Gros Islet, St Lucia
Umpires: Verdayne Smith and Joel Wilson
Player of the match: Darren Sammy (WI)

- Barbados won the toss and elected to bat.

18 January
16:00 (D/N)
Scorecard

Combined Campuses and Colleges (Cricket West Indies); 150/5 (20 overs)	v	Jamaica; 151/3 (16.4 overs)
Kyle Corbin 47 (32); Nikita Miller 2/26 (4 overs)		Chris Gayle 85 (44); Kevin McClean 2/23 (4 overs)

Jamaica won by 7 wickets
Beausejour Stadium, Gros Islet, St Lucia
Umpires: Peter Nero and Nandkumar Shivsankar
Player of the match: Chris Gayle (Jam)

- Combined Campuses and Colleges won the toss and elected to bat.
- T20 debut: Yanick Elliot (Jamaica)

18 January
20:00 (D/N)
Scorecard

Windward Islands (Cricket West Indies); 117/7 (20 overs)	v	Guyana; 118/6 (20 overs)
Keddy Lesporis 26 (21); Steven Jacobs 2/12 (4 overs)		Derwin Christian 39 (41); Garey Mathurin 2/20 (4 overs)

Guyana won by 4 wickets
Beausejour Stadium, Gros Islet, St Lucia
Umpires: Gregory Brathwaite and Patrick Gustard
Player of the match: Steven Jacobs (Guyana)

- Guyana won the toss and elected to field.

== Playoff stage ==
=== Bracket ===
Playoff			Final
			1	Trinidad and Tobago	120/1 (12.3 overs)
2	Jamaica	183/6 (20 overs)	PW	Guyana	116/6 (20 overs)
3	Guyana	187/4 (18.4 overs)

=== Playoff ===
19 January
20:00 (D/N)
Scorecard

Jamaica; 183/6 (20 overs)	v	Guyana; 187/4 (18.4 overs)
Chris Gayle 122* (61); Ronsford Beaton 2/25 (4 overs)		Christopher Barnwell 88 (49); Yanick Elliott 1/24 (3 overs)

Guyana won by 6 wickets
Beausejour Stadium, Gros Islet, St Lucia
Umpires: Peter Nero and Joel Wilson
Player of the match: Christopher Barnwell (Guyana)

- Guyana won the toss and elected to field.

=== Final ===
20 January
20:00 (D/N)
Scorecard

Guyana; 116/6 (20 overs)	v	Trinidad and Tobago; 120/1 (12.3 overs)
Christopher Barnwell 32 (39); Shannon Gabriel 2/16 (4 overs)		Lendl Simmons 52* (37); Ronsford Beaton 1/11 (4 overs)

Trinidad and Tobago won by 9 wickets
Beausejour Stadium, Gros Islet, St Lucia
Umpires: Gregory Brathwaite and Patrick Gustard
Player of the match: Shannon Gabriel (Trinidad and Tobago)

- Trinidad and Tobago won the toss and elected to field

== Statistics ==
=== Highest team totals ===
The following table lists the six highest team scores during the season.

Team	Total	Opponent	Ground
Trinidad and Tobago	191/4 (20 overs)	Guyana	Port of Spain
Guyana	187/4 (18.4 overs)	Jamaica	Gros Islet
Trinidad and Tobago	187/4 (20 overs)	Leeward Islands	Port of Spain
Jamaica	183/6 (20 overs)	Guyana	Gros Islet
Guyana	160/8 (20 overs)	Combined Campuses and Colleges	Port of Spain
Combined Campuses and Colleges	159/3 (20 overs)	Guyana	Port of Spain

Last Updated 20 January 2013.

=== Most runs ===
The top five highest run scorers (total runs) in the season are included in this table.

Player	Team	Runs	Inns	Avg	S/R	HS	100s	50s	4s	6s
Christopher Barnwell	Guyana	245	8	35.00	133.15	88	0	2	18	10
Darren Bravo	Trinidad and Tobago	225	6	75.00	151.00	82*	0	3	16	13
Chris Gayle	Jamaica	207	2	207.00	197.14	122*	1	1	9	21
Lendl Simmons	Trinidad and Tobago	182	7	30.33	118.18	62	0	2	9	11
Chadwick Walton	Combined Campuses and Colleges	171	6	34.20	127.61	99*	0	1	13	7

Last Updated 21 January 2013.

=== Highest individual scores ===
This table contains the top five highest scores of the season made by a batsman in a single innings.

Player	Team	Score	Balls	4s	6s	Opponent	Ground
Chris Gayle	Jamaica	122*	61	5	12	Guyana	Gros Islet
Chadwick Walton	Combined Campuses and Colleges	99*	64	3	6	Guyana	Port of Spain
Christopher Barnwell	Guyana	88	49	7	4	Jamaica	Gros Islet
Chris Gayle	Jamaica	85	44	4	9	Combined Campuses and Colleges	Gros Islet
Darren Bravo	Trinidad and Tobago	82*	51	8	4	Guyana	Port of Spain

Last Updated 20 January 2013.

=== Most wickets ===
The following table contains the five leading wicket-takers of the season.

Player	Team	Wkts	Mts	Ave	S/R	Econ	BBI
Tino Best	Barbados	10	6	11.40	11.1	6.16	4/19
Carlos Brathwaite	Barbados	9	6	10.88	14.0	4.66	4/23
Krishmar Santokie	Jamaica	9	7	16.88	17.3	5.84	3/24
Garey Mathurin	Windward Islands	8	6	13.37	17.2	4.65	2/18
Raymon Reifer	Combined Campuses and Colleges	8	6	14.62	11.2	7.80	4/32

Last Updated 20 January 2013.

=== Best bowling figures ===
This table lists the top five players with the best bowling figures in the season.

Player	Team	Overs	Figures	Opponent	Ground
Derone Davis	Combined Campuses and Colleges	4	4/5	Barbados	Port of Spain
Liam Sebastien	Windward Islands	4	4/17	Leeward Islands	Port of Spain
Tino Best	Barbados	4	4/19	Combined Campuses and Colleges	Port of Spain
Andre Russell	Jamaica	4	4/22	Guyana	Gros Islet
Carlos Brathwaite	Barbados	4	4/23	Jamaica	Port of Spain

Last Updated 20 January 2013.
