= 2007–08 KFC Cup =

Cricket tournament

- Dates: 16 – 28 October 2007
- Administrator: WICB
- Cricket format: List A (50 overs)
- Tournament format(s): Group stage, finals
- Host(s): Barbados; Guyana
- Champions: Jamaica (7th title)
- Participants: 8
- Matches: 15
- Most runs: (Jamaica) Chris Gayle (177)
- Most wickets: (Jamaica) Jerome Taylor (11)

The 2007–08 KFC Cup was the 34th edition of the Regional Super50, the domestic limited-overs cricket competition for the countries of the West Indies Cricket Board (WICB). The competition was played between 16 and 28 October 2007, with the group stage hosted by Guyana and the play-offs hosted by Barbados.

Eight teams contested the competition – the six regular teams of West Indian domestic cricket (Barbados, Guyana, Jamaica, the Leeward Islands, Trinidad and Tobago, and the Windward Islands), and two development teams (Combined Campuses and Colleges and the West Indies under-19 side). The Combined Campuses were competing for the first team. Jamaica eventually defeated Trinidad and Tobago in the final by 28 runs, winning their seventh domestic one-day title. Earlier in the tournament, the West Indies under-19s had been bowled out for 18 by Barbados, setting a new record for the lowest total in a List A match.

== Squads ==
Barbados	(Cricket West Indies) Combined Campuses	Guyana	Jamaica
Corey Collymore (c); Sulieman Benn; Wayne Blackman; Patrick Browne; Jonathan Carter; Pedro Collins; Fidel Edwards; Kirk Edwards; Martin Nurse; Dale Richards; Dwayne Smith; Ryan Wiggins	Shirley Clarke (c); Jason Bennett; Khismar Catlin; Romaine Chattergoon; Romel Currency; Craig Emmanuel; Simon Jackson; Kavesh Kantasingh; Ashley Nurse; Nekoli Parris; Omar Phillips; Floyd Reifer; Chadwick Walton	Ramnaresh Sarwan (c); Sewnarine Chattergoon; Derwin Christian; Esuan Crandon; Royston Crandon; Narsingh Deonarine; Travis Dowlin; Assad Fudadin; Leon Johnson; Reon King; Neil McGarrell; Zaheer Mohamed; Mahendra Nagamootoo	Chris Gayle (c); Carlton Baugh; Shawn Findlay; Danza Hyatt; Tamar Lambert; Nikita Miller; Brendan Nash; Brenton Parchment; Daren Powell; Andrew Richardson; Krishmar Santokie; Donovan Sinclair; Jerome Taylor
Leeward Islands	Trinidad and Tobago	West Indies U19	Windward Islands
Runako Morton (c); Justin Athanaze; Lionel Baker; Omari Banks; Romain Doodnauth; Chaka Hodge; Shane Jeffers; Javier Liburd; Steve Liburd; Curtis Roberts; Joel Simmonds; Gavin Tonge; Tonito Willett	Daren Ganga (c); Samuel Badree; Mario Belcon; Dwayne Bravo; Merv Dillon; Rayad Emrit; Sherwin Ganga; Amit Jaggernauth; Jason Mohammed; Magnum Nanan; Kieron Pollard; Denesh Ramdin; Ravi Rampaul; Lendl Simmons	Steven Jacobs (c); Nkruma Bonner; Rashidi Boucher; Darren Bravo; Shamarh Brooks; Rajindra Chandrika; Andre Creary; Jason Dawes; Chesney Hughes; Delorn Johnson; Linden Lawrence; Veerasammy Permaul; Kieran Powell; Devon Thomas; Shacaya Thomas; Kelbert Walters	Rawl Lewis (c); Miles Bascombe; Deighton Butler; Heron Campbell; Andre Fletcher; Donwell Hector; Lindon James; Garey Mathurin; Mervin Matthew; Nelon Pascal; Darren Sammy; Liam Sebastien; Shane Shillingford; Devon Smith

== Group stage ==
=== Zone A ===
Team	Pld	W	L	T	NR	BP	Pts	NRR
Jamaica	3	3	0	0	0	3	15	+1.737
Barbados	3	2	1	0	0	2	10	+1.155
Leeward Islands	3	1	2	0	0	0	4	–0.322
West Indies U19	3	0	3	0	0	0	0	–2.486

17 October 2007
Scorecard

West Indies U19; 18 (14.3 overs)	v	Barbados; 22/2 (5.5 overs)

Barbados won by 8 wickets
Blairmont Sports Club Ground, Blairmont
Player of the match: Pedro Collins (Bar)

- The West Indies under-19 team's total of 18 all out was the lowest in the history of List A cricket, breaking a record set by Middlesex in the 1974 John Player League. Pedro Collins' figures of 7/11 were the best in a List A match in the West Indies.

17 October 2007
Scorecard

Leeward Islands; 167 (44.3 overs)	v	Jamaica; 169/4 (39.5 overs)

Jamaica won by 6 wickets
Guyana National Stadium, Providence
Player of the match: Omari Banks (Lee)

19 October 2007
Scorecard

Barbados; 230 (48.4 overs)	v	Leeward Islands; 216 (41.1 overs)

Barbados won by 14 runs
Bourda, Georgetown
Player of the match: Fidel Edwards (Bar)

19 October 2007
Scorecard

West Indies U19; 110 (36.4 overs)	v	Jamaica; 112/1 (13 overs)

Jamaica won by 9 wickets
Enmore Recreation Ground, Enmore
Player of the match: Chris Gayle (Jam)

21 October 2007
Scorecard

Barbados; 170 (50 overs)	v	Jamaica; 171/4 (43 overs)

Jamaica won by 6 wickets
Guyana National Stadium, Providence
Player of the match: Brendan Nash (Jam)

21 October 2007
Scorecard

West Indies U19; 159 (46.4 overs)	v	Leeward Islands; 160/5 (48 overs)

Leeward Islands won by 5 wickets
Enmore Recreation Ground, Enmore
Player of the match: Omari Banks (Lee)

=== Zone B ===
Team	Pld	W	L	T	NR	BP	Pts	NRR
Trinidad and Tobago	3	2	0	1	0	2	12	+1.202
Guyana	3	2	1	0	0	1	9	+0.591
Windward Islands	3	1	2	0	0	1	5	–0.440
(Cricket West Indies) Combined Campuses	3	0	0	1	0	0	2	–1.207

16 October 2007
Scorecard

Windward Islands; 179/9 (50 overs)	v	Guyana; 180/7 (48.5 overs)

Guyana won by 3 wickets
Albion Sports Complex, Albion
Player of the match: Ramnaresh Sarwan (Guy)

16 October 2007
Scorecard

Trinidad and Tobago; 252 (49.2 overs)	v	(Cricket West Indies) Combined Campuses; 252/9 (50 overs)

Match tied
Guyana National Stadium, Providence
Player of the match: Floyd Reifer (CCC)

18 October 2007
Scorecard

Guyana; 279/8 (50 overs)	v	(Cricket West Indies) Combined Campuses; 180 (45.5 overs)

Guyana won by 99 runs
Guyana National Stadium, Providence
Player of the match: Travis Dowlin (Guy)

18 October 2007
Scorecard

Windward Islands; 142 (45.5 overs)	v	Trinidad and Tobago; 144/3 (20 overs)

Trinidad and Tobago won by 7 wickets
Bourda, Georgetown

20 October 2007
Scorecard

Combined Campuses (Cricket West Indies); 131 (39.1 overs)	v	Windward Islands; 132/5 (33.4 overs)

Windward Islands won by 5 wickets
Blairmont Sports Club Ground, Blairmont
Player of the match: Rawl Lewis (Win)

20 October 2007
Scorecard

Guyana; 208/8 (50 overs)	v	Trinidad and Tobago; 209/6 (46 overs)

Trinidad and Tobago won by 4 wickets
Guyana National Stadium, Providence
Player of the match: Rayad Emrit (T&T)

== Finals ==
=== Semi-finals ===
25 October 2007
Scorecard

Guyana; 159/9 (43 overs)	v	Jamaica; 160/3 (40.2 overs)

Jamaica won by 7 wickets
Three Ws Oval, Cave Hill
Player of the match: Brendan Nash (Jam)

- The match was reduced to 43 overs per side before the start of play.

26 October 2007
Scorecard

Barbados	v	Trinidad and Tobago

Match abandoned
Three Ws Oval, Cave Hill

- Trinidad and Tobago proceeded to the final based on a better group-stage record.

=== Final ===
28 October 2007
Scorecard

Jamaica; 230 (50 overs)	v	Trinidad and Tobago; 202 (49.3 overs)

Jamaica won by 28 runs
Three Ws Oval, Cave Hill
Player of the match: Jerome Taylor (Jam)

== Statistics ==
=== Most runs ===
The top five run scorers (total runs) are included in this table.

Player	Team	Runs	Inns	Avg	Highest	100s	50s
Chris Gayle	Jamaica	177	5	35.40	71	0	1
Shawn Findlay	Jamaica	157	5	52.33	64*	0	1
Floyd Reifer	(Cricket West Indies) Combined Campuses	156	2	78.00	130	1	0
Brenton Parchment	Jamaica	154	5	38.50	52	0	1
Lendl Simmons	Trinidad and Tobago	154	4	38.50	68	0	2

Source: CricketArchive

=== Most wickets ===
The top five wicket takers are listed in this table, listed by wickets taken and then by bowling average.

Player	Team	Overs	Wkts	Ave	SR	Econ	BBI
Jerome Taylor	Jamaica	43.3	11	17.18	23.72	4.34	3/34
Pedro Collins	Barbados	27.3	9	9.11	18.33	2.98	7/11
Fidel Edwards	Barbados	22.0	8	11.75	16.50	4.27	5/61
Rayad Emrit	Trinidad and Tobago	28.0	7	16.14	24.00	4.03	4/43
Brendan Nash	Jamaica	40.0	6	16.66	40.00	2.50	4/20

Source: CricketArchive
