= 2009–10 WICB President's Cup =

- Dates: 28 October – 5 November 2009
- Administrator: WICB
- Cricket format: List A (50 overs)
- Tournament format(s): Group stage, finals
- Host: Guyana
- Champions: Trinidad and Tobago (10th title)
- Participants: 8
- Matches: 15
- Most runs: (Guyana) Narsingh Deonarine (186)
- Most wickets: (Trinidad and Tobago) Dwayne Bravo (Guyana) Royston Crandon (9)

The 2009–10 WICB President's Cup was the 36th edition of the Regional Super50, the domestic limited-overs cricket competition for the countries of the West Indies Cricket Board (WICB). The competition was played as a standalone tournament, with all matches held in Guyana.

Eight teams contested the competition – the six regular teams of West Indian domestic cricket (Barbados, Guyana, Jamaica, the Leeward Islands, Trinidad and Tobago, and the Windward Islands), and two development teams (Combined Campuses and Colleges and the West Indies under-19 side). The group stages were heavily impacted by rain – out of twelve matches in total, four were shortened, two ended in no result, and five were abandoned entirely. The final was played at Guyana National Stadium in Providence, with Trinidad and Tobago defeating Guyana by 81 runs to claim their tenth domestic one-day title (and second in a row). Guyana's Narsingh Deonarine led the tournament in runs, while his teammate Royston Crandon and Trinidad's Dwayne Bravo were the equal leading wicket-takers.

== Squads ==
Barbados	(Cricket West Indies) Combined Campuses	Guyana	Jamaica
Ryan Hinds (c); Sulieman Benn; Tino Best; Rashidi Boucher; Jonathan Carter; Nikolai Charles; Kirk Edwards; Alcindo Holder; Carlo Morris; Martin Nurse; Kemar Roach; Dwayne Smith; Khalid Springer; Kevin Stoute	Floyd Reifer (c); Ryan Austin; Khismar Catlin; Romel Currency; Simon Jackson; Kavesh Kantasingh; Kevin McClean; Kjorn Ottley; Nekoli Parris; Omar Phillips; Gavin Wallace; Chadwick Walton; Kurt Wilkinson	Ramnaresh Sarwan (c); Christopher Barnwell; Devendra Bishoo; Shivnarine Chanderpaul; Sewnarine Chattergoon; Esuan Crandon; Royston Crandon; Narsingh Deonarine; Travis Dowlin; Delbert Hicks; Veerasammy Permaul	Carlton Baugh (c); David Bernard; Odean Brown; Shawn Findlay; Chris Gayle; Wavell Hinds; Danza Hyatt; Xavier Marshall; Nikita Miller; Brendan Nash; Brenton Parchment; Daren Powell; Andrew Richardson; Jerome Taylor
Leeward Islands	Trinidad and Tobago	West Indies U19	Windward Islands
Steve Liburd (c); Justin Athanaze; Lionel Baker; Wilden Cornwall; Jahmar Hamilton; Chesney Hughes; Anthony Martin; Runako Morton; Kieran Powell; Gavin Tonge; Tonito Willett	Daren Ganga (c); Samuel Badree; Adrian Barath; Darren Bravo; Dwayne Bravo; Sherwin Ganga; Dave Mohammed; Kieron Pollard; Denesh Ramdin; Ravi Rampaul; Lendl Simmons	Jermaine Blackwood; Nelson Bolan; Kraigg Brathwaite; Yannic Cariah; Akeem Dewar; Shane Dowrich; Nicholson Gordon; Trevon Griffith; Patrick Harty; Jason Holder; Keon Joseph; Evin Lewis; Yannick Ottley; Dalton Polius; Kejel Tyson; Kelbert Walters; Jomel Warrican	Darren Sammy (c); Miles Bascombe; Deighton Butler; Craig Emmanuel; Andre Fletcher; Donwell Hector; Rawl Lewis; Nelon Pascal; Liam Sebastien; Shane Shillingford; Devon Smith

== Group stage ==
=== Zone A ===
Team	Pld	W	L	NR	A	BP	Pts	NRR
Trinidad and Tobago	3	1	0	0	2	1	7	+2.045
(Cricket West Indies) Combined Campuses	3	1	0	1	1	0	6	+0.023
Windward Islands	3	0	1	0	2	0	2	–0.023
Jamaica	3	0	1	1	1	0	2	–2.045

28 October 2009
Scorecard

Combined Campuses (Cricket West Indies); 178/6 (44 overs)	v	Windward Islands; 177 (43.4 overs)

Combined Campuses won by 1 run
Everest Cricket Club Ground, Georgetown
Player of the match: Kavesh Kantasingh (CCC)

- The match was reduced to 44 overs per side before the start of play.

28 October 2009
Scorecard

Trinidad and Tobago; 201/9 (44 overs)	v	Jamaica; 111/9 (44 overs)

Trinidad and Tobago won by 90 runs
Guyana National Stadium, Providence
Player of the match: Samuel Badree (T&T)

- The match was reduced to 44 overs per side before the start of play.

30 October 2009
Scorecard

Combined Campuses (Cricket West Indies); 41/2 (12.1 overs)	v	Jamaica

No result
Bourda, Georgetown

30 October 2009
Scorecard

Trinidad and Tobago	v	Windward Islands

Match abandoned
Uitvlugt Community Centre Ground, Uitvlugt

31 October 2009
Scorecard

Combined Campuses (Cricket West Indies)	v	Trinidad and Tobago

Match abandoned
Everest Cricket Club Ground, Georgetown

31 October 2009
Scorecard

Jamaica	v	Windward Islands

Match abandoned
Enmore Recreation Ground, Enmore

=== Zone B ===
Team	Pld	W	L	NR	A	BP	Pts	NRR
Guyana	3	2	0	0	1	0	9	+0.771
Barbados	3	1	1	0	1	0	5	–0.312
West Indies U19	3	0	1	1	1	0	2	–0.278
Leeward Islands	3	0	1	1	1	0	2	–0.342

28 October 2009
Scorecard

West Indies U19; 172/6 (40 overs)	v	Barbados; 177/8 (38.4 overs)

Barbados won by 2 wickets
Bourda, Georgetown
Player of the match: Akeem Dewar (U19)

- The match was reduced to 40 overs per side before the start of play.

28 October 2009
Scorecard

Leeward Islands; 193 (49.5 overs)	v	Guyana; 194/7 (46.1 overs)

Guyana won by 3 wickets
Enmore Recreation Ground, Enmore
Player of the match: Royston Crandon (Guy)

30 October 2009
Scorecard

Barbados; 231/9 (49 overs)	v	Guyana; 236/3 (42.1 overs)

Guyana won by 7 wickets (D/L)
Albion Sports Complex, Albion
Player of the match: Narsingh Deonarine (Guy)

- The match was reduced to 49 overs per side, Guyana's target was 232 runs.

30 October 2009
Scorecard

Leeward Islands; 37/0 (6 overs)	v	West Indies U19

No result
Guyana National Stadium, Providence

31 October 2009
Scorecard

Barbados	v	Leeward Islands

Match abandoned
Uitvlugt Community Centre Ground, Uitvlugt

31 October 2009
Scorecard

Guyana	v	West Indies U19

Match abandoned
Bourda, Georgetown

== Finals ==
=== Semi-finals ===
2 November 2009
Scorecard

Barbados; 229 (49.5 overs)	v	Trinidad and Tobago; 230/8 (49.2 overs)

Trinidad and Tobago won by 2 wickets
Guyana National Stadium, Providence
Player of the match: Daren Ganga (T&T)

3 November 2009
Scorecard

Combined Campuses (Cricket West Indies); 151 (48.3 overs)	v	Guyana; 152/4 (40.3 overs)

Guyana won by 6 wickets
Guyana National Stadium, Providence
Player of the match: Shivnarine Chanderpaul (Guy)

=== Final ===
5 November 2009
Scorecard

Trinidad and Tobago; 286/6 (50 overs)	v	Guyana; 205 (45.3 overs)

Trinidad and Tobago won by 81 runs
Guyana National Stadium, Providence
Player of the match: Kieron Pollard (Tri)

== Statistics ==
=== Most runs ===
The top five run scorers (total runs) are included in this table.

Player	Team	Runs	Inns	Avg	Highest	100s	50s
Narsingh Deonarine	Guyana	186	4	62.00	102*	1	1
Ramnaresh Sarwan	Guyana	170	4	56.66	59	0	1
Daren Ganga	Trinidad and Tobago	144	3	72.00	79*	0	1
Darren Bravo	Trinidad and Tobago	120	3	40.00	76	0	1
Shivnarine Chanderpaul	Guyana	110	4	55.00	50*	0	1

Source: CricketArchive

=== Most wickets ===
The top five wicket takers are listed in this table, listed by wickets taken and then by bowling average.

Player	Team	Overs	Wkts	Ave	SR	Econ	BBI
Dwayne Bravo	Trinidad and Tobago	28.5	9	13.88	19.22	4.33	6/46
Royston Crandon	Guyana	37.5	9	21.33	25.22	5.07	4/25
Devendra Bishoo	Guyana	32.0	8	13.75	24.00	3.43	3/24
Veerasammy Permaul	Guyana	37.3	6	24.00	37.50	3.84	3/54
Kieron Pollard	Trinidad and Tobago	11.0	5	9.20	13.20	4.18	3/37

Source: CricketArchive
