= 2010 Champions League Twenty20 squads =

This is a list of the squads that qualified for the 2010 Champions League Twenty20. All teams had to submit a final squad of 15 on August 9, 2010.

== South Australian Redbacks ==
Coach: (Australia) Mark Sorell

No.	Name	Nat	Birth date	Batting style	Bowling style
Batsmen
12	Callum Ferguson	(Australia)	21 November 1984 (aged 25)	Right-handed	Right arm medium pace
18	Michael Klinger (c)	(Australia)	4 June 1980 (aged 30)	Right-handed	Right arm medium pace
23	Cameron Borgas	(Australia)	1 September 1983 (aged 27)	Right-handed	Right arm medium pace
29	Daniel Harris	(Australia)	31 December 1979 (aged 30)	Right-handed	Right arm medium pace
All-rounders
11	Aaron O'Brien	(Australia)	2 October 1981 (aged 28)	Left-handed	Slow left-arm orthodox
26	Tom Cooper	(Netherlands) (Australia)	26 November 1986 (aged 23)	Right-handed	Right arm off break
45	Daniel Christian	(Australia)	4 May 1983 (aged 27)	Right-handed	Right arm fast-medium
--	Chris Duval	(Australia)	3 August 1983 (aged 27)	Right-handed	Right arm fast-medium
Wicket-keepers
7	Graham Manou	(Australia)	23 April 1979 (aged 31)	Right-handed	—
22	Tim Ludeman	(Australia)	23 June 1987 (aged 23)	Right-handed	—
Bowlers
9	Cullen Bailey	(Australia)	26 February 1985 (aged 25)	Right-handed	Right arm leg break
10	Gary Putland	(Australia)	10 February 1986 (aged 24)	Right-handed	Left arm fast-medium
14	Peter George	(Australia)	16 October 1986 (aged 23)	Right-handed	Right arm fast-medium
21	Jake Haberfield	(Australia)	18 June 1986 (aged 24)	Right-handed	Right arm fast
32	Shaun Tait	(Australia)	22 February 1983 (aged 27)	Right-handed	Right arm fast

== Victorian Bushrangers ==
Coach: (Australia) Greg Shipperd

No.	Name	Nat	Birth date	Batting style	Bowling style
Batsmen
5	Aaron Finch	(Australia)	17 November 1986 (aged 23)	Right-handed	Left arm medium pace
7	Brad Hodge	(Australia)	29 December 1974 (aged 35)	Right-handed	Right arm off break
8	David Hussey (c)	(Australia)	15 July 1977 (aged 33)	Right-handed	Right arm off break
12	Robert Quiney	(Australia)	20 August 1982 (aged 28)	Left-handed	Right arm medium pace
All-rounders
4	Andrew McDonald	(Australia)	15 June 1981 (aged 29)	Right-handed	Right arm fast-medium
11	John Hastings	(Australia)	4 November 1985 (aged 24)	Right-handed	Right arm fast-medium
32	Glenn Maxwell	(Australia)	14 September 1987 (aged 22)	Right-handed	Right arm off break
Wicket-keepers
13	Matthew Wade	(Australia)	26 December 1987 (aged 22)	Left-handed	—
16	Ryan Carters	(Australia)	25 June 1990 (aged 20)	Right-handed	—
Bowlers
2	Shane Harwood	(Australia)	1 March 1974 (aged 36)	Right-handed	Right arm fast-medium
15	Clinton McKay	(Australia)	22 February 1983 (aged 27)	Right-handed	Right arm fast-medium
18	Bryce McGain	(Australia)	25 March 1972 (aged 38)	Right-handed	Right arm leg break
19	James Pattinson	(Australia)	3 May 1990 (aged 20)	Left-handed	Right arm fast-medium
20	Peter Siddle	(Australia)	25 November 1984 (aged 25)	Right-handed	Right arm fast-medium
26	Dirk Nannes	(Australia)	16 May 1976 (aged 34)	Right-handed	Left arm fast-medium

== Chennai Super Kings ==
Coach: (New Zealand) Stephen Fleming

No.	Name	Nat	Birth date	Batting style	Bowling style
Batsmen
3	Suresh Raina	(India)	27 November 1986 (aged 23)	Left-handed	Right arm off break
8	Murali Vijay	(India)	1 April 1984 (aged 26)	Right-handed	Right arm off break
28	Matthew Hayden	(Australia)	29 October 1971 (aged 38)	Left-handed	Right arm medium pace
33	Subramaniam Badrinath	(India)	30 August 1980 (aged 30)	Right-handed	Right arm off break
48	Michael Hussey	(Australia)	27 May 1975 (aged 35)	Left-handed	Right arm medium pace
77	Anirudha Srikkanth	(India)	14 April 1987 (aged 23)	Right-handed	—
All-rounders
5	Justin Kemp	(South Africa)	2 October 1977 (aged 32)	Right-handed	Right arm fast-medium
81	Albie Morkel	(South Africa)	10 June 1981 (aged 29)	Left-handed	Right arm medium-fast
--	Joginder Sharma	(India)	23 October 1983 (aged 26)	Right-handed	Right arm fast-medium
Wicket-keepers
7	Mahendra Singh Dhoni (c)	(India)	7 July 1981 (aged 29)	Right-handed	Right arm medium pace
Bowlers
4	Doug Bollinger	(Australia)	24 July 1981 (aged 29)	Left-handed	Left arm fast-medium
27	Shadab Jakati	(India)	27 November 1980 (aged 29)	Left-handed	Slow left-arm orthodox
55	Lakshmipathy Balaji	(India)	27 September 1981 (aged 28)	Right-handed	Right arm medium-fast
99	Ravichandran Ashwin	(India)	17 September 1986 (aged 23)	Right-handed	Right arm off break
800	Muttiah Muralitharan	(Sri Lanka)	17 April 1972 (aged 38)	Right-handed	Right arm off break

== Mumbai Indians ==
Coach: (India) Robin Singh

No.	Name	Nat	Birth date	Batting style	Bowling style
Batsmen
10	Sachin Tendulkar (c)	(India)	24 April 1973 (aged 37)	Right-handed	Right arm off break
15	Saurabh Tiwary	(India)	30 December 1989 (aged 20)	Left-handed	—
16	Shikhar Dhawan	(India)	5 December 1985 (aged 24)	Left-handed	—
21	Jean-Paul Duminy	(South Africa)	14 April 1984 (aged 26)	Left-handed	Right arm off break
All-rounders
8	Ryan McLaren	(South Africa)	9 February 1983 (aged 27)	Left-handed	Right arm medium-fast
23	Rajagopal Sathish	(India)	14 January 1981 (aged 29)	Right-handed	Right arm medium
47	Dwayne Bravo	(Trinidad and Tobago)	7 October 1983 (aged 26)	Right-handed	Right arm medium-fast
55	Kieron Pollard	(Trinidad and Tobago)	12 May 1987 (aged 23)	Right-handed	Right arm medium-fast
Wicket-keepers
7	Aditya Tare	(India)	7 November 1987 (aged 22)	Right-handed	—
90	Ambati Rayudu	(India)	23 September 1985 (aged 24)	Right-handed	Right arm off break
Bowlers
3	Harbhajan Singh	(India)	3 July 1980 (aged 30)	Right-handed	Right arm off break
14	Abu Nechim	(India)	5 November 1988 (aged 21)	Right-handed	Right arm fast-medium
34	Zaheer Khan	(India)	7 October 1978 (aged 31)	Right-handed	Left arm fast-medium
39	Ali Murtaza	(India)	1 January 1990 (aged 20)	Left-handed	Slow left-arm orthodox
99	Lasith Malinga	(Sri Lanka)	28 August 1983 (aged 27)	Right-handed	Right arm fast

== Royal Challengers Bangalore ==
Coach: (South Africa) Ray Jennings

No.	Name	Nat	Birth date	Batting style	Bowling style
Batsmen
5	Virat Kohli	(India)	5 November 1988 (aged 21)	Right-handed	Right arm medium
19	Rahul Dravid	(India)	11 January 1973 (aged 37)	Right-handed	Right arm off break
21	Ross Taylor	(New Zealand)	8 March 1984 (aged 26)	Right-handed	Right arm off break
69	Manish Pandey	(India)	10 September 1989 (aged 21)	Right-handed	Right arm off break
All-rounders
3	Jacques Kallis	(South Africa)	16 October 1975 (aged 34)	Right-handed	Right arm fast-medium
18	Cameron White	(Australia)	18 August 1983 (aged 27)	Right-handed	Right arm leg break
25	Akhil Balachandra	(India)	7 October 1977 (aged 32)	Right-handed	Right arm medium-fast
26	Dillon du Preez	(South Africa)	8 November 1981 (aged 28)	Right-handed	Right arm fast-medium
Wicket-keepers
99	Robin Uthappa	(India)	11 November 1985 (aged 24)	Right-handed	Right arm medium
Bowlers
2	Dale Steyn	(South Africa)	27 June 1983 (aged 27)	Right-handed	Right arm fast
8	Praveen Kumar	(India)	2 October 1986 (aged 23)	Right-handed	Right arm medium
23	Vinay Kumar	(India)	12 February 1984 (aged 26)	Right-handed	Right arm medium
37	Anil Kumble (c)	(India)	17 October 1970 (aged 39)	Right-handed	Right arm leg break
42	Nayan Doshi	(England)	6 October 1978 (aged 31)	Right-handed	Slow left-arm orthodox
61	Abhimanyu Mithun	(India)	25 October 1989 (aged 20)	Right-handed	Right arm medium

== Central Stags ==
Coach: (New Zealand) Alan Hunt

No.	Name	Nat	Birth date	Batting style	Bowling style
Batsmen
2	Mathew Sinclair	(New Zealand)	9 November 1975 (aged 34)	Right-handed	Right arm medium pace
7	Jamie How (c)	(New Zealand)	19 May 1981 (aged 29)	Right-handed	Right arm medium pace
12	Peter Ingram	(New Zealand)	25 October 1978 (aged 31)	Right-handed	Right arm off break
14	Brad Patton	(New Zealand)	9 November 1979 (aged 30)	Left-handed	Right arm medium-fast
19	George Worker	(New Zealand)	23 August 1989 (aged 21)	Left-handed	Slow left-arm orthodox
All-rounders
6	Doug Bracewell	(New Zealand)	28 September 1990 (aged 19)	Right-handed	Right arm medium pace
10	Brendon Diamanti	(New Zealand)	30 April 1981 (aged 29)	Right-handed	Right arm medium-fast
11	Seth Rance	(New Zealand)	23 August 1987 (aged 23)	Right-handed	Right arm medium pace
17	Kieran Noema-Barnett	(New Zealand)	4 June 1987 (aged 23)	Left-handed	Right arm medium pace
22	Adam Milne	(New Zealand)	13 April 1992 (aged 18)	Right-handed	Right arm medium-fast
--	Ben Wheeler	(New Zealand)	10 November 1991 (aged 18)	Right-handed	Left arm medium pace
Wicket-keepers
3	Tim Weston	(New Zealand)	6 June 1982 (aged 28)	Right-handed	—
4	Bevan Griggs	(New Zealand)	29 March 1978 (aged 32)	Right-handed	—
Bowlers
9	Michael Mason	(New Zealand)	27 August 1974 (aged 36)	Right-handed	Right arm fast-medium
21	Mitchell McClenaghan	(New Zealand)	11 June 1986 (aged 24)	Left-handed	Left arm medium-fast

== Highveld Lions ==
Coach: (South Africa) Dave Nosworthy

No.	Name	Nat	Birth date	Batting style	Bowling style
Batsmen
4	Neil McKenzie	(South Africa)	24 November 1975 (aged 34)	Right-handed	Right arm medium pace
60	Vaughn van Jaarsveld	(South Africa)	2 February 1985 (aged 25)	Left-handed	Right arm medium pace
73	Alviro Petersen (c)	(South Africa)	25 November 1980 (aged 29)	Right-handed	Right arm medium pace
97	Jonathan Vandiar	(South Africa)	25 April 1990 (aged 20)	Left-handed	Right arm leg break
All-rounders
9	Shane Burger	(South Africa)	31 August 1982 (aged 28)	Right-handed	Right arm fast-medium
17	Richard Cameron	(South Africa)	17 June 1986 (aged 24)	Right-handed	Right arm
19	Werner Coetsee	(South Africa)	16 March 1983 (aged 27)	Right-handed	Right arm off break
24	Robert Frylinck	(South Africa)	27 September 1984 (aged 25)	Right-handed	Right arm medium pace
55	Cliffe Deacon	(South Africa)	23 June 1980 (aged 30)	Left-handed	Left arm fast-medium
58	Zander de Bruyn	(South Africa)	5 July 1975 (aged 35)	Right-handed	Right arm fast-medium
69	Aaron Phangiso	(South Africa)	21 January 1984 (aged 26)	Right-handed	Slow left-arm orthodox
--	Jean Symes	(South Africa)	13 November 1986 (aged 23)	Left-handed	Slow left-arm orthodox
Wicket-keepers
10	Thami Tsolekile	(South Africa)	9 October 1980 (aged 29)	Right-handed	—
Bowlers
54	Ethan O'Reilly	(South Africa)	27 December 1985 (aged 24)	Right-handed	Right arm fast
--	Craig Alexander	(South Africa)	5 January 1987 (aged 23)	Right-handed	Right arm fast

== Warriors ==
Coach: (South Africa) Russell Domingo

No.	Name	Nat	Birth date	Batting style	Bowling style
Batsmen
5	Ashwell Prince	(South Africa)	28 May 1977 (aged 33)	Left-handed	Right arm off break
10	Craig Thyssen	(South Africa)	25 March 1984 (aged 26)	Right-handed	Right arm medium-fast
13	Arno Jacobs	(South Africa)	13 March 1977 (aged 33)	Left-handed	Right arm off break
21	Jon-Jon Smuts	(South Africa)	21 August 1988 (aged 22)	Right-handed	Slow left-arm orthodox
41	Colin Ingram	(South Africa)	3 July 1985 (aged 25)	Left-handed	Left arm leg spin
All-rounders
22	Johan Botha	(South Africa)	2 May 1982 (aged 28)	Right-handed	Right arm off break
77	Justin Kreusch	(South Africa)	27 September 1979 (aged 30)	Right-handed	Right arm medium pace
Wicket-keepers
9	Mark Boucher	(South Africa)	3 December 1976 (aged 33)	Right-handed	—
82	Davy Jacobs (c)	(South Africa)	4 November 1982 (aged 27)	Right-handed	—
Bowlers
16	Makhaya Ntini	(South Africa)	6 July 1977 (aged 33)	Right-handed	Right arm fast
23	Juan Theron	(South Africa)	24 July 1985 (aged 25)	Right-handed	Right arm medium-fast
34	Nicky Boje	(South Africa)	20 March 1973 (aged 37)	Left-handed	Slow left-arm orthodox
40	Garnett Kruger	(South Africa)	5 January 1977 (aged 33)	Right-handed	Right arm medium-fast
64	Lonwabo Tsotsobe	(South Africa)	7 March 1984 (aged 26)	Right-handed	Left arm fast-medium
--	Lyall Meyer	(South Africa)	23 March 1982 (aged 28)	Left-handed	Right arm fast

== Wayamba Elevens ==
Coach: Manoj Abeywickrama

No.	Name	Nat	Birth date	Batting Style	Bowling Style
Batsmen
6	Mahela Udawatte	(Sri Lanka)	19 July 1986 (aged 24)	Left-handed	Right arm off break
24	Jeevantha Kulatunga	(Sri Lanka)	2 November 1973 (aged 36)	Right-handed	Right arm medium pace
27	Mahela Jayawardene	(Sri Lanka)	27 May 1977 (aged 33)	Right-handed	Right arm medium pace
42	Jehan Mubarak (c)	(Sri Lanka)	10 January 1981 (aged 29)	Left-handed	Right arm off break
43	Damitha Hunukumbura	(Sri Lanka)	7 November 1977 (aged 32)	Left-handed	Right arm off spin
All-rounders
28	Farveez Maharoof	(Sri Lanka)	4 January 1980 (aged 30)	Right-handed	Right arm fast-medium
69	Shalika Karunanayake	(Sri Lanka)	14 February 1987 (aged 23)	Right-handed	Right arm fast-medium
Wicket-keepers
8	Kushal Janith Perera	(Sri Lanka)	17 August 1990 (aged 20)	Left-handed	—
44	Sameera de Zoysa	(Sri Lanka)	31 January 1987 (aged 23)	Left-handed	—
Bowlers
1	Thissara Perera	(Sri Lanka)	3 April 1989 (aged 21)	Left-handed	Right arm medium-fast
12	Chanaka Welegedara	(Sri Lanka)	20 March 1981 (aged 29)	Right-handed	Left arm fast-medium
14	Rangana Herath	(Sri Lanka)	19 March 1978 (aged 32)	Left-handed	Slow left-arm orthodox
17	Isuru Udana	(Sri Lanka)	17 February 1988 (aged 22)	Right-handed	Left arm medium-fast
23	Kaushal Lokuarachchi	(Sri Lanka)	20 May 1982 (aged 28)	Right-handed	Right arm leg break
40	Ajantha Mendis	(Sri Lanka)	11 March 1985 (aged 25)	Right-handed	Right arm off break

== Guyana ==
Coach: (Guyana) Ravindranauth Seeram

No.	Name	Nat	Birth date	Batting Style	Bowling Style
Batsmen
8	Travis Dowlin	(Guyana)	24 February 1977 (aged 33)	Right-handed	Right arm off break
13	Assad Fudadin	(Guyana)	1 August 1985 (aged 25)	Left-handed	Right arm medium-fast
28	Narsingh Deonarine	(Guyana)	16 August 1983 (aged 27)	Left-handed	Right arm off break
40	Richard Ramdeen	(Guyana)	16 February 1988 (aged 22)	Right-handed	Slow left-arm orthodox
53	Ramnaresh Sarwan (c)	(Guyana)	23 June 1980 (aged 30)	Right-handed	Right arm leg break
65	Sewnarine Chattergoon	(Guyana)	3 April 1981 (aged 29)	Left-handed	Right arm leg break
All-rounders
2	Royston Crandon	(Guyana)	31 May 1983 (aged 27)	Right-handed	Right arm off break
15	Steven Jacobs	(Guyana)	13 September 1988 (aged 21)	Right-handed	Right arm off break
25	Jonathan Foo	(Guyana)	11 September 1990 (aged 19)	Right-handed	Right arm leg spin
33	Paul Wintz	(Guyana)	7 March 1986 (aged 24)	Right-handed	Right arm fast-medium
71	Lennox Cush	(United States)	12 December 1974 (aged 35)	Right-handed	Right arm off break
90	Christopher Barnwell	(Guyana)	6 January 1987 (aged 23)	Right-handed	Right arm medium-fast
Wicket-keepers
11	Derwin Christian	(Guyana)	9 May 1983 (aged 27)	Right-handed	—
Bowlers
20	Devendra Bishoo	(Guyana)	6 November 1985 (aged 24)	Right-handed	Right arm leg break
54	Esuan Crandon	(Guyana)	17 December 1981 (aged 28)	Left-handed	Right arm fast
