= Leslie Reifer =

Leslie Reifer may refer to:

- Leslie Reifer (cricketer) (born 1958)
- Leslie Reifer (umpire) (born 1989)
