= 2023 Abu Dhabi Knight Riders season =

2023 International League T20 cricket team

Abu Dhabi Knight Riders in 2023
2023 season
- Coach: Abhishek Nayar
- Captain: Sunil Narine
- Ground(s): Sheikh Zayed Cricket Stadium, Abu Dhabi

The 2023 edition is the inaugural season for the International League T20 franchise Abu Dhabi Knight Riders. They are one of the six teams competing in the 2023 International League T20.

== Background ==
In August 2022, the Emirates Cricket Board (ECB) announced the establishment of the International League T20, a Twenty20 Cricket competition to be started in 2023. The teams for the competition, representing 6 different cities of United Arab Emirates, including Abu Dhabi, were put up on auction in UAE in September 2022. The Abu Dhabi franchise was purchased & revealed by Kolkata Knight Riders, part of Knight Riders Franchise. The team unveiled their logo and jersey in January 2023, through their social media handles.

== Points table ==
Pos	Team	Pld	W	L	NR	Pts	NRR
1	Gulf Giants (C)	10	7	1	2	16	1.258
2	Desert Vipers (R)	10	7	3	0	14	0.399
3	MI Emirates	10	5	4	1	11	1.059
4	Dubai Capitals	10	4	5	1	9	−0.386
5	Sharjah Warriors	10	3	6	1	7	−0.522
6	Abu Dhabi Knight Riders	10	1	8	1	3	−1.784

Source: ESPNCricinfo
(C) Champions; (R) Runners-up
- The top 4 teams qualified for the playoffs.
- Advanced to Qualifier 1
- Advanced to Eliminator

== Squad ==
Batters	Wicket-keepers	All rounders	Pacers	Spinners
(Ireland) Paul Stirling; (Sri Lanka) Charith Asalanka; (South Africa) Colin Ingram; (Jamaica) Brandon King; (Jamaica) Kennar Lewis; (South Africa) Connor Esterhuizen	(England) Jonny Bairstow; (England) Joe Clarke	(Trinidad and Tobago) Sunil Narine (c); (Jamaica) Andre Russell; (Trinidad and Tobago) Akeal Hosein; (Sri Lanka) Seekkuge Prasanna; (Barbados) Raymon Reifer; (Sri Lanka) Dhananjaya de Silva	(Sri Lanka) Lahiru Kumara; (Trinidad and Tobago) Ravi Rampaul; (United States) Ali Khan; (Netherlands) Brandon Glover; (United Arab Emirates) Matiullah Khan; (South Africa) Marchant de Lange	(United Arab Emirates) Fahad Nawaz; (United Arab Emirates) Sabir Ali; (United Arab Emirates) Zawar Farid; (Sri Lanka) Traveen Mathew
Source: ESPNcricinfo

== Fixtures ==
Match 1
13 January 2023
18:00 (N)
Scorecard

Dubai Capitals; 187/6 (20 overs)	v	Abu Dhabi Knight Riders; 114/9 (20 overs)
Rovman Powell 48 (29); Ravi Rampaul 2/36 (4 overs)		Paul Stirling 54 (38); Rovman Powell 2/15 (2 overs)

Dubai Capitals won by 73 runs.
Dubai International Cricket Stadium, Dubai
Umpires: Simon Taufel (Aus) and Rod Tucker (Aus)
Player of the match: Rovman Powell (Dubai Capitals)

- Abu Dhabi Knight Riders won the toss and elected to field.

Match 3
15 January 2023
14:00
Scorecard

Abu Dhabi Knight Riders; 114/9 (20 overs)	v	Gulf Giants; 115/4 (14.2 overs)
Andre Russell 26 (12); Sanchit Sharma 3/9 (3 overs)		James Vince 65 (44); Sunil Narine 2/21 (4 overs)

Gulf Giants won by 6 wickets
Sheikh Zayed Cricket Stadium, Abu Dhabi
Umpires: Ruchira Palliyaguruge (SL) and Martin Saggers (Eng)
Player of the match: Sanchit Sharma (Gulf Giants)

- Abu Dhabi Knight Riders won the toss and elected to bat.

Match 7
18 January 2023
18:00 (N)
Scorecard

Abu Dhabi Knight Riders; 133/8 (20 overs)	v	Desert Vipers; 135/3 (15.4 overs)
Brandon King 57 (44); Wanindu Hasaranga 3/18 (4 overs)		Alex Hales 64 (47); Akeal Hosein 1/24 (4 overs)

Desert Vipers won by 7 wickets
Dubai International Cricket Stadium, Dubai
Umpires: Shiju Sam (UAE) and Rod Tucker (Aus)
Player of the match: Wanindu Hasaranga (Desert Vipers)

- Desert Vipers won the toss and elected to field.

Match 9
20 January 2023
18:00 (N)
Scorecard

Desert Vipers; 219/4 (20 overs)	v	Abu Dhabi Knight Riders; 108 (15.1 overs)
Alex Hales 110 (59); Lahiru Kumara 2/31 (4 overs)		Andre Russell 57 (29); Sheldon Cottrell 3/13 (4 overs)

Desert Vipers won by 111 runs.
Sheikh Zayed Cricket Stadium, Abu Dhabi
Umpires: Leslie Reifer (WI) and Alex Wharf (Eng)
Player of the match: Alex Hales (Desert Vipers)

- Abu Dhabi Knight Riders won the toss and elected to field.

Match 11
21 January 2023
18:00 (N)
Scorecard

Abu Dhabi Knight Riders; 170/7 (20 overs)	v	MI Emirates; 176/5 (20 overs)
Dhananjaya de Silva 65 (40); Fazalhaq Farooqi 2/27 (4 overs)		Andre Fletcher 53 (43); Lahiru Kumara 2/34 (4 overs)

MI Emirates won by 5 wickets.
Sheikh Zayed Cricket Stadium, Abu Dhabi
Umpires: Shiju Sam (UAE) and Alex Wharf (Eng)
Player of the match: Najibullah Zadran (MI Emirates)

- MI Emirates won the toss and elected to field.

Match 16
25 January 2023
18:00 (N)
Scorecard

Gulf Giants	v	Abu Dhabi Knight Riders

Match Abandoned.
Dubai International Cricket Stadium, Dubai
Umpires: Richard Kettleborough (Eng) and Ruchira Palliyaguruge (SL)

- Abu Dhabi Knight Riders won the toss and elected to field.
- No play was possible due to rain.

Match 19
28 January 2023
13:00
Scorecard

Abu Dhabi Knight Riders; 149/4 (20 overs)	v	Sharjah Warriors; 150/6 (17 overs)
Paul Stirling 55 (50); Paul Walter 2/29 (4 overs)		Rahmanullah Gurbaz 56 (39); Lahiru Kumara 3/36 (4 overs)

Sharjah Warriors won by 4 wickets.
Sharjah Cricket Stadium, Sharjah
Umpires: Richard Kettleborough (Eng) and Leslie Reifer (WI)
Player of the match: Rahmanullah Gurbaz (Sharjah Warriors)

- Sharjah Warriors won the toss and elected to field.

Match 22
30 January 2023
18:00 (N)
Scorecard

Abu Dhabi Knight Riders; 149/9 (20 overs)	v	Dubai Capitals; 150/3 (17.4 overs)
Joe Clarke 52 (27); Adam Zampa 3/16 (4 overs)		George Munsey 57 (43); Akeal Hosein 1/21 (3.4 overs)

Dubai Capitals won by 7 wickets
Sheikh Zayed Cricket Stadium, Abu Dhabi
Umpires: Richard Kettleborough (Eng) and Leslie Reifer (WI)
Player of the match: Adam Zampa (Dubai Capitals)

- Dubai Capitals won the toss and elected to field.

Match 26
3 February 2023
18:00 (N)
Scorecard

MI Emirates; 180/4 (20 overs)	v	Abu Dhabi Knight Riders; 162 (19.2 overs)
Muhammad Waseem 60 (43); Sabir Ali 1/21 (2 overs)		Andre Russell 42 (22); Dwayne Bravo 3/37 (4 overs)

MI Emirates won by 18 runs.
Sheikh Zayed Cricket Stadium, Abu Dhabi
Umpires: Akbar Ali (UAE) and Ruchira Palliyaguruge (SL)
Player of the match: Kieron Pollard (MI Emirates)

- Abu Dhabi Knight Riders won the toss and elected to field.

Match 28
4 February 2023
18:00 (N)
Scorecard

Sharjah Warriors; 130/9 (20 overs)	v	Abu Dhabi Knight Riders; 133/5 (16.4 overs)
Tom Kohler-Cadmore 46 (40); Matiullah Khan 2/24 (3 overs)		Joe Clarke 54 (32); Muhammad Jawadullah 3/24 (4 overs)

Abu Dhabi Knight Riders won by 5 wickets.
Sheikh Zayed Cricket Stadium, Abu Dhabi
Umpires: Ruchira Palliyaguruge (SL) and Rod Tucker (Aus)
Player of the match: Joe Clarke (Abu Dhabi Knight Riders)

- Abu Dhabi Knight Riders won the toss and elected to field.

== Statistics ==
=== Most runs ===
Runs	Player	Inns	HS	Ave	SR	100	50	4s	6s
196	(Jamaica) Andre Russell	9	57	21.78	151.94	-	1	15	14
168	(Ireland) Paul Stirling	6	55	28.00	109.80	-	2	15	5
135	(England) Joe Clarke	4	54	33.75	158.82	-	2	19	4
128	(Jamaica) Brandon King	9	57	16.00	107.56	-	1	13	4
107	(Sri Lanka) Dhananjaya de Silva	5	65	21.40	122.99	-	1	10	3
Last updated: 4 February 2023, Source: ESPNcricinfo

=== Most wickets ===
Wkts.	Player	Inns	Ov	Runs	BBI	Ave	Econ	SR	4W	5W
8	(Sri Lanka) Lahiru Kumara	5	18.0	169	3/36	21.13	9.39	13.50	-	-
7	(Trinidad and Tobago) Sunil Narine	9	36.0	237	3/24	33.86	6.58	30.86	-	-
7	(Trinidad and Tobago) Akeal Hosein	9	35.0	262	2/22	37.43	7.49	30.00	-	-
5	(Jamaica) Andre Russell	8	24.4	270	3/25	54.00	10.95	29.60	-	-
3	(Trinidad and Tobago) Ravi Rampaul	2	7.0	63	4/33	21.00	9.00	14.00	-	-
Last updated: 4 February 2023, Source: ESPNcricinfo
