= West Indian cricket team in England in 2011 =

	West Indies	England
- Dates: 23 September 2011 – 25 September 2011
Captains	Darren Sammy	Graeme Swann

Twenty20 International series
- Results: 2-match series drawn 1–1
Most runs	Johnson Charles (57)	Craig Kieswetter (68)
Most wickets	Garey Mathurin (3)	Ravi Bopara (5)

The West Indian cricket team toured England in September 2011. The tour consisted of two Twenty20 matches. The fixtures in London were organised by the ECB, to fulfill contractual agreements with the WICB and Sky Sports. England won the first T20I by ten wickets, following which the West Indies won the second match by 25 runs to level the series.

== Background ==
The England and Wales Cricket Board scheduled the series to fulfill contractual agreements with the West Indies Cricket Board and Sky Sports. England were originally scheduled to play the Stanford Super Series, but the series was cancelled after the arrest of its founder, Allen Stanford. The ECB had already budgeted for the money they received from the contract and were unable to return the money lost by the cancellation of the Stanford Super Series. Thus, in June 2011, they announced that they would play two extra T20Is with the West Indies in September.

== Venues ==
Both matches took place at The Oval in Kennington, London.

== Squads ==
West Indies	England
Darren Sammy (c); Christopher Barnwell; Miles Bascombe; Devendra Bishoo; Nkruma Bonner; Johnson Charles; Derwin Christian (wk); Fidel Edwards; Danza Hyatt; Garey Mathurin; Andre Russell; Marlon Samuels; Krishmar Santokie; Dwayne Smith	Graeme Swann (c); James Anderson; Jonny Bairstow; Ravi Bopara; Scott Borthwick; Tim Bresnan; Danny Briggs; Jos Buttler; Jade Dernbach; Steven Finn; Alex Hales; Craig Kieswetter (wk); Samit Patel; Ben Stokes

As the tour clashed with the Champions League Twenty20, many of the West Indies' senior players were unavailable for the series. The squad excluded seven senior players and featured four uncapped players, Miles Bascombe, Johnson Charles, Nkrumah Bonner, and Derwin Christian. England were also forced to field a weakened side after Stuart Broad and Eoin Morgan, the captain and vice-captain, were ruled out due to injury.

Ashley Nurse was replaced by Garey Mathurin after failing a fitness test at a preparation camp held in Barbados.

== T20I series ==
=== 1st T20I ===
23 September
Scorecard

West Indies; 125 (19.4 overs)	v	England; 128/0 (15.2 overs)
Johnson Charles 36 (39); Ravi Bopara 4/10 (3.4 overs)		Alex Hales 62* (48)

England won by 10 wickets
The Oval, London
Umpires: Rob Bailey (Eng) and Nigel Llong (Eng)
Player of the match: Ravi Bopara (Eng)

- England won the toss and elected to field.
- Ben Stokes, Jonny Bairstow (Eng) and Derwin Christian, Nkrumah Bonner and Johnson Charles (WI) all made their T20I debut.
- Ravi Bopara's figures of 4 wickets for 10 runs set a new record for best figures by an English bowler in a T20 International.

In the first T20I, England won the toss and chose to field first. The West Indian openers, Dwayne Smith and Johnson Charles, scored 42 runs off the first four overs. Smith, Marlon Samuels, and Charles were then dismissed soon after each other, and the West Indies innings struggled to gain momentum. The only other West Indian batsman to reach double figures was Danza Hyatt, who was dismissed for 28. The West Indies lost their last seven wickets for 28 runs and went from 97 for 3 to 125 all out. In the chase, England raced to 52 for no loss in the first six overs on their way to a ten-wicket win. Hales and Kieswetter both scored fifties, off 36 and 43 balls respectively. It was England's first ten-wicket win in a T20I and, with 28 balls left, highest number of deliveries remaining after a successful chase.

=== 2nd T20I ===
25 September
Scorecard

West Indies; 113/5 (20 overs)	v	England; 88 (16.4 overs)
Marlon Samuels 35* (35); Samit Patel 2/22 (4 overs)		Ben Stokes 31 (23); Garey Mathurin 3/9 (4 overs)

West Indies won by 25 runs
The Oval, London
Umpires: Richard Illingworth (Eng) and Nigel Llong (Eng)
Player of the match: Garey Mathurin (WI)

- England won the toss and elected to field.
- Garey Mathurin, Krishmar Santokie and Miles Bascombe (WI) and Scott Borthwick (Eng) all made their T20I debut.
