= List of West Indies Twenty20 International cricketers =

This is a list of West Indian Twenty20 International cricketers. A Twenty20 International is an international cricket match between two representative teams, each having T20 status, as determined by the International Cricket Council (ICC). A Twenty20 International is played under the rules of Twenty20 cricket. The list is arranged in the order in which each player won his first Twenty20 cap. Where more than one player won his first Twenty20 cap in the same match, those players are listed alphabetically by surname.

== Key ==
General

- ‡ – Captain
- † – Wicket-keeper
- First – Year of debut
- Last – Year of latest game
- Mat – Number of matches played

Fielding

- Ca – Catches taken
- St – Stumpings taken

Batting

- Runs – Runs scored in career
- HS – Highest score
- Avg – Average runs scored per dismissal
- 50s – Number of half centuries
- 100 – Centuries scored
- * – Batsman remained not out

Bowling

- Balls – Balls bowled in career
- Wkt – Wickets taken in career
- BBI – Best bowling in an innings
- Ave – Average runs conceded per wicket

== Players ==
Statistics are correct as of 1 March 2026.

West Indies T20I cricketers
Cap	Name	First	Last	Mat	Batting					Bowling				Fielding	
Cap	Name	First	Last	Mat	Runs	HS	Avg	50s	100s	Balls	Wkt	BBI	Ave	Ca	St
1	Ian Bradshaw	2006	2006	1	0	0*	—	0	0	24	0	—	—	1	0
2	Dwayne Bravo ‡	2006	2021	91	1,255	66*	22.01	4	0	1,505	78	4/19	26.10	44	0
3	Deighton Butler	2006	2006	1	—	—	—	—	—	—	—	—	—	1	0
4	Shivnarine Chanderpaul ‡	2006	2015	22	343	41	20.17	0	0	—	—	—	—	7	0
5	Daren Ganga	2006	2006	1	26	26	26.00	0	0	—	—	—	—	0	0
6	Chris Gayle	2006	2021	79	1,899	117	27.92	14	2	381	20	2/15	22.00	20	0
7	Wavell Hinds	2006	2010	5	30	14	7.50	0	0	—	—	—	—	1	0
8	Runako Morton	2006	2010	7	96	40	16.00	0	0	—	—	—	—	2	0
9	Denesh Ramdin ‡†	2006	2019	71	636	55*	18.70	1	0	—	—	—	—	43	20
10	Dwayne Smith	2006	2015	33	582	72	18.18	3	0	142	7	3/24	30.28	8	0
11	Jerome Taylor	2006	2018	30	118	21	13.11	0	0	600	33	3/6	26.15	9	0
12	Daren Powell	2007	2007	5	1	1*	—	0	0	102	2	1/6	65.50	2	0
13	Ravi Rampaul	2007	2021	27	15	8	7.50	0	0	575	31	3/16	25.90	2	0
14	Darren Sammy (Note: Samuel Badree and Darren Sammy also played T20I cricket for World XI. Only their records for West Indies are given above.) ‡	2007	2016	66	534	42*	15.70	0	0	880	44	5/26	24.27	30	0
15	Marlon Samuels	2007	2019	67	1,611	89*	29.29	10	0	479	22	3/23	28.27	12	0
16	Devon Smith	2007	2009	6	203	61	33.83	1	0	—	—	—	—	1	0
17	Austin Richards	2007	2007	1	10	10	10.00	0	0	—	—	—	—	0	0
18	Lendl Simmons	2007	2021	68	1,527	91*	26.78	9	0	43	6	4/19	12.00	35	0
19	Fidel Edwards	2007	2021	26	11	7*	5.50	0	0	449	20	3/23	30.85	5	0
20	Ramnaresh Sarwan ‡	2007	2010	18	298	59	22.92	2	0	12	2	2/10	5.00	7	0
21	Brenton Parchment	2007	2007	1	10	10	10.00	0	0	—	—	—	—	0	0
22	Rawl Lewis	2008	2008	1	—	—	—	—	—	6	0	—	—	1	0
23	Sulieman Benn	2008	2016	24	37	13*	12.33	0	0	504	18	4/6	33.66	10	0
24	Andre Fletcher †	2008	2024	60	984	84*	19.68	6	0	—	—	—	—	24	3
25	Xavier Marshall	2008	2009	6	96	36	16.00	0	0	—	—	—	—	3	0
26	William Perkins	2008	2008	1	9	9	9.00	0	0	—	—	—	—	1	0
27	Kieron Pollard ‡	2008	2022	101	1,569	75*	25.30	6	0	856	42	4/25	28.28	42	0
28	Kemar Roach	2008	2012	11	3	3*	—	0	0	234	10	2/25	28.40	1	0
29	Lionel Baker	2008	2009	3	—	—	—	—	—	48	2	1/12	29.00	0	0
30	Carlton Baugh, Jr.	2008	2012	3	10	7	3.33	0	0	—	—	—	—	0	0
31	Shawn Findlay	2008	2008	3	32	19	16.00	0	0	—	—	—	—	1	0
32	David Bernard	2009	2009	1	1	1*	1.00	0	0	24	0	—	—	0	0
33	Travis Dowlin	2009	2010	3	68	37*	68.00	0	0	—	—	—	—	0	0
34	Nikita Miller	2009	2014	9	43	15*	43.00	0	0	190	11	2/20	20.36	2	0
35	Floyd Reifer ‡	2009	2009	1	22	22	22.00	0	0	—	—	—	—	1	0
36	Dale Richards	2009	2009	1	0	0	0.00	0	0	—	—	—	—	0	0
37	Devon Thomas †	2009	2022	12	51	31*	8.50	0	0	—	—	—	—	12	2
38	Gavin Tonge	2009	2009	1	—	—	—	—	—	24	1	1/25	25.00	1	0
39	Narsingh Deonarine	2010	2013	8	55	36*	11.00	0	0	54	0	—	—	2	0
40	Adrian Barath	2010	2011	2	23	15	11.50	0	0	—	—	—	—	1	0
41	Darren Bravo	2010	2022	26	405	43*	21.31	0	0	—	—	—	—	5	0
42	Christopher Barnwell	2011	2013	6	78	34*	19.50	0	0	36	1	1/24	51.00	2	0
43	Devendra Bishoo	2011	2019	7	17	8	8.50	0	0	121	7	4/17	19.57	1	0
44	Danza Hyatt	2011	2012	5	64	28	16.00	0	0	—	—	—	—	4	0
45	Ashley Nurse	2011	2019	13	85	20*	42.50	0	0	240	8	2/6	39.75	6	0
46	Andre Russell	2011	2025	86	1,122	71	22.00	3	0	1,221	61	3/19	31.45	21	0
47	Nkrumah Bonner	2011	2012	2	27	24	13.50	0	0	12	0	—	—	0	0
48	Johnson Charles †	2011	2026	69	1,525	118	22.42	5	1	—	—	—	—	25	2
49	Derwin Christian	2011	2011	2	0	0	0.00	0	0	—	—	—	—	0	0
50	Miles Bascombe	2011	2011	1	3	3	3.00	0	0	—	—	—	—	0	0
51	Garey Mathurin	2011	2012	3	4	3*	—	0	0	60	4	3/9	16.25	1	0
52	Krishmar Santokie	2011	2014	12	0	0*	—	0	0	245	18	4/21	15.44	1	0
53	Carlos Brathwaite ‡	2011	2019	41	310	37*	14.76	0	0	709	31	3/20	32.67	19	0
54	Anthony Martin	2011	2011	1	—	—	—	—	—	18	1	1/20	20.00	2	0
55	Sunil Narine	2012	2019	51	155	30	10.33	0	0	1,102	52	4/12	21.25	7	0
56	Samuel Badree	2012	2018	50	43	14*	7.16	0	0	1,104	54	4/15	20.75	7	0
57	Tino Best	2013	2014	6	17	17*	—	0	0	120	6	3/18	25.66	0	0
58	Shannon Gabriel	2013	2013	2	—	—	—	—	—	42	3	3/44	18.66	1	0
59	Kieran Powell	2014	2014	1	12	12	12.00	0	0	—	—	—	—	1	0
60	Chadwick Walton †	2014	2018	19	225	40	13.23	0	0	—	—	—	—	13	2
61	Jason Holder ‡	2014	2026	96	888	49	18.50	0	0	2,013	108	5/27	27.02	51	0
62	Sheldon Cottrell	2014	2023	45	18	4*	4.50	0	0	918	52	4/28	23.92	19	0
63	Evin Lewis	2014	2026	67	1,799	125*	29.01	13	2	—	—	—	—	17	0
64	Nicholas Pooran ‡†	2016	2024	106	2,275	98	26.14	13	0	—	—	—	—	63	8
65	Kesrick Williams	2016	2020	26	19	13*	6.33	0	0	551	41	4/28	19.63	8	0
66	Rovman Powell ‡	2017	2026	117	2,261	107	25.98	10	1	131	5	2/31	43.40	58	0
67	Jason Mohammed ‡	2017	2018	9	90	23*	18.00	0	0	12	0	—	—	1	0
68	Shai Hope ‡†	2017	2026	67	1,672	102*	29.85	11	1	—	—	—	—	27	1
69	Shimron Hetmyer	2018	2026	82	1,593	85	24.50	7	0	—	—	—	—	41	0
70	Rayad Emrit	2018	2018	4	17	11	5.66	0	0	96	4	1/24	39.00	0	0
71	Keemo Paul	2018	2022	23	187	29	20.77	0	0	462	25	5/15	28.00	3	0
72	Veerasammy Permaul	2018	2018	1	—	—	—	—	—	3	0	—	—	0	0
73	Odean Smith	2018	2023	27	193	27*	14.84	0	0	450	27	3/29	28.59	12	0
74	Andre McCarthy	2018	2018	1	5	5	5.00	0	0	12	0	—	—	0	0
75	Fabian Allen	2018	2025	42	298	34	14.90	0	0	605	24	2/18	31.91	26	0
76	Khary Pierre	2018	2026	16	31	11	6.20	0	0	288	11	2/23	39.81	5	0
77	Oshane Thomas	2018	2023	21	9	8*	2.25	0	0	408	21	5/28	30.38	2	0
78	Sherfane Rutherford	2018	2026	53	834	76*	23.16	5	0	54	2	1/20	46.00	17	0
79	Obed McCoy	2019	2025	43	68	23*	9.71	0	0	826	52	6/17	23.11	4	0
80	John Campbell	2019	2019	2	11	11	5.50	0	0	6	0	—	—	1	0
81	Brandon King	2019	2026	84	1,973	85*	25.62	14	0	—	—	—	—	33	0
82	Hayden Walsh Jr. (Note: Hayden Walsh Jr. and Karima Gore have also played T20I cricket for United States. Only their records for West Indies are given above.)	2019	2024	31	36	12*	9.00	0	0	534	25	3/23	28.88	7	0
83	Romario Shepherd	2020	2026	79	909	52*	28.40	1	0	1,332	81	5/20	27.44	14	0
84	Kyle Mayers	2020	2025	41	773	73	20.89	3	0	120	2	2/26	95.50	17	0
85	Kevin Sinclair	2021	2021	6	3	3	3.00	0	0	108	4	2/23	37.50	3	0
86	Akeal Hosein	2021	2026	96	293	44*	14.65	0	0	1,964	93	5/11	26.12	22	0
87	Roston Chase	2021	2026	57	813	67*	23.91	4	0	850	38	3/12	28.36	17	0
88	Shamarh Brooks	2021	2022	13	218	56*	19.81	1	0	—	—	—	—	7	0
89	Dominic Drakes	2021	2022	10	15	5	3.00	0	0	192	6	1/19	48.33	2	0
90	Gudakesh Motie	2021	2026	51	205	33	14.64	0	0	960	49	4/28	25.85	13	0
91	Alzarri Joseph	2022	2025	45	129	21*	16.12	0	0	990	62	5/40	24.59	13	0
92	Yannic Cariah	2022	2022	2	3	2*	—	0	0	36	1	1/15	43.00	0	0
93	Raymon Reifer	2022	2023	3	46	27	23.00	0	0	30	1	1/42	60.00	0	0
94	Matthew Forde	2023	2026	25	187	29*	17.00	0	0	448	23	3/19	26.78	16	0
95	Shamar Joseph	2024	2026	22	32	21*	32.00	0	0	450	26	4/30	27.03	11	0
96	Alick Athanaze	2024	2026	15	334	60	23.85	2	0	6	0	—	—	4	0
97	Shamar Springer	2024	2026	6	71	39	35.50	0	0	84	8	4/20	14.12	3	0
98	Terrance Hinds	2024	2024	2	5	5*	—	0	0	26	1	1/30	54.00	0	0
99	Justin Greaves	2024	2026	2	18	12	9.00	0	0	6	0	—	—	2	0
100	Jayden Seales	2024	2026	9	7	4*	7.00	0	0	180	7	3/32	44.42	2	0
101	Keacy Carty	2025	2026	8	80	49*	16.00	0	0	—	—	—	—	2	0
102	Jediah Blades	2025	2025	6	5	3*	—	0	0	119	6	3/29	29.66	1	0
103	Jewel Andrew	2025	2025	5	78	35	15.60	0	0	—	—	—	—	2	0
104	Ackeem Auguste	2025	2025	9	164	50	23.42	1	0	—	—	—	—	3	0
105	Navin Bidaisee	2025	2025	3	24	22	12.00	0	0	48	3	3/29	20.66	2	0
106	Amir Jangoo †	2025	2026	7	163	74*	32.60	1	0	—	—	—	—	3	1
107	Ramon Simmonds	2025	2026	4	1	1	1.00	0	0	78	6	4/15	17.50	0	0
108	Zishan Motara	2025	2025	1	3	3	3.00	0	0	6	0	—	—	0	0
109	Karima Gore	2025	2025	1	—	—	—	—	—	18	0	—	—	0	0
110	Quentin Sampson	2026	2026	3	35	30	11.66	0	0	—	—	—	—	1	0

== See also ==
- Twenty20
- West Indian cricket team
- List of West Indies Test cricketers
- List of West Indies ODI cricketers
