= Leslie Reifer (cricketer) =

Barbadian cricketer (born 1958)

Personal information
- Full name: Leslie Norman Reifer
- Born: 1 December 1958 (age 67); Airy Hill, St George, Barbados
- Batting: Right-handed
- Bowling: Right-arm offbreak
- Relatives: Leslie Reifer (son); Elvis Reifer (brother); George Reifer (brother); Raymon Reifer (nephew); Floyd Reifer (nephew)

Domestic team information
- Years: Team
- 1978–1988: Barbados
- FC debut: 17 February 1978 Barbados v Jamaica
- Last FC: 4 February 1988 Barbados v Windward Islands
- LA debut: 25 February 1978 Barbados v Windward Islands
- Last LA: 3 March 1988 Barbados v Jamaica

Career statistics
Competition	First-class	List A
Matches	25	15
Runs scored	765	272
Batting average	19.61	38.85
100s/50s	1/1	0/1
Top score	153 not out	52 not out
Balls bowled	60	48
Wickets	1	0
Bowling average	26.00	–
5 wickets in innings	0	–
10 wickets in match	0	–
Best bowling	1/18	–
Catches/stumpings	22/–	5/–
- Source: CricketArchive, 29 December 2013

Leslie Norman Reifer (born 1 December 1958) is a Barbadian former cricketer. His son Leslie Reifer is a cricket umpire.

== Playing career ==
Reifer represented Barbados between 1977 and 1988.
