= Anderson Sealy =

Barbadian cricketer

Personal information
- Full name: Anderson Wendle Leandro Sealy
- Born: 10 July 1982; Saint Michael, Barbados
- Batting: Right-handed
- Bowling: Left-arm orthodox

Domestic team information
- Years: Team
- 2002–2004: West Indies B
- 2008–2009: Combined Campuses
- Source: Cricinfo, 19 November 2016

Anderson Wendle Leandro Sealy (born 10 July 1982) is a former Barbadian cricketer who represented West Indies B and the Combined Campuses and Colleges in West Indian domestic cricket. He played as a left-arm orthodox bowler.

Sealy represented Barbados at under-19 level, but never played for the senior national team. He made his first-class debut in the 2001–02 Busta Cup, playing for West Indies B, and finished the season with a team-high 19 wickets (including 5/79 against Bangladesh A). Despite his good form, Sealy was not retained in the West Indies B squad for the 2002–03 season. He returned to the squad for the 2003–04 Carib Beer Cup, but played just two matches.

After a gap of over four years, Sealy returned to top-level West Indian domestic cricket for the 2008–09 WICB Cup (a limited-overs competition), representing the Combined Campuses team. He took four wickets in two matches, including 3/30 against the Windward Islands, and was retained in the squad for the 2008–09 Regional Four Day Competition. In that competition, Sealy took 15 wickets from four matches, including 4/66 against Barbados and 4/170 against the Leeward Islands. However, he was left out of the squad for the following season, instead only being named as a reserve.
