= Horace Miller (cricketer) =

Jamaican cricketer (born 1989)

Personal information
- Born: 26 October 1989 (age 37); Jamaica
- Batting: Right-handed
- Role: Wicket-keeper

Domestic team information
- Years: Team
- 2010–2015: Jamaica
- Source: CricketArchive, 3 January 2016

Horace Miller (born 26 October 1989) is a Jamaican cricketer who plays for the Jamaican national side in West Indian domestic cricket, and has also represented the Jamaica Tallawahs franchise in the Caribbean Premier League (CPL). He is a right-handed batsman and occasional wicket-keeper.

Miller played for the West Indies under-19s at the 2008 Under-19 World Cup in Malaysia. He made his senior debut for Jamaica in the 2008–09 WICB Cup, a limited-overs competition, and his first-class debut against Trinidad and Tobago in the 2009–10 Regional Four Day Competition. In the match, Miller scored 66 runs in his team's first innings, which remains his highest first-class score to date. He is yet to play a full season for Jamaica, and so far has generally been used as a specialist batsman, with either Carlton Baugh or Chadwick Walton taking the gloves. For the 2015 Caribbean Premier League season, Miller signed with the Jamaica Tallawahs franchise, playing four games.
