= Donovan Sinclair =

Jamaican cricketer (born 1985)

Personal information
- Full name: Donovan Lloyd Sinclair
- Born: 13 August 1985 (age 41); Saint Elizabeth, Jamaica
- Batting: Right-handed
- Bowling: Right-arm leg-spin
- Role: All-rounder

Domestic team information
- Years: Team
- 2006–2008: Jamaica
- Source: CricketArchive, 18 January 2016

Donovan Lloyd Sinclair (born 13 August 1985) is a Jamaican cricketer who has played for the Jamaica national team in West Indian domestic cricket. He is a right-arm leg-spin bowler.

Sinclair made his senior debut for Jamaica in May 2006, playing a 50-over match against the touring Indians. He failed to take a wicket, finishing with 0/29 from six overs. Sinclair's List A debut for Jamaica came in October 2007, against the Leeward Islands in the 2007–08 KFC Cup. He took 1/12 on debut and 2/20 in the next match against Barbados, but was not retained in the team for the finals. Sinclair made his first-class debut in May 2008, playing for a Jamaica Select XI against the touring Australians. He took 3/14 from 6.3 overs in Australia's first innings, dismissing Brad Haddin, Mitchell Johnson, and Stuart MacGill. He was retained in Jamaica's squad for the 2008–09 WICB Cup, but played only a single match, against Barbados.
