= Yannick Elliott =

Jamaican cricketer

Personal information
- Full name: Yannick Ricardo Elliott
- Born: 15 June 1986 (age 40); Kingston, Surrey, Jamaica
- Batting: Right-handed
- Bowling: Right-arm off break

Domestic team information
- Years: Team
- 2008/09/11/13: Jamaica

Career statistics
Competition	List A
Matches	3
Runs scored	13
Batting average	6.50
100s/50s	–/–
Top score	7
Balls bowled	120
Wickets	4
Bowling average	46.00
5 wickets in innings	–
10 wickets in match	–
Best bowling	1/29
Catches/stumpings	1/–
- Source: Cricinfo, 21 May 2011

Yannick Ricardo Elliott (born 15 June 1986) is a Jamaican cricketer. Elliott is a right-handed batsman who bowls right-arm off break. He was born in Kingston, Surrey County.

Elliott made his debut for Jamaica in a List A match against Barbados in November 2008. He played a further List A match, coming later in November 2008 against Trinidad and Tobago. In his first match against Barbados, he scored 7 runs before being run out by Kenroy Williams. With the ball he bowled 10 wicket-less overs, although conceding just 17 runs. In his second match against Trinidad and Tobago, he scored 6 runs before being dismissed by Kieron Pollard. With the ball, he took his first List A wicket, that of Gibran Mohammed for the cost of 29 runs from 10 overs. He was also apart Jamaica winning team in the 2011 regional super 50 tournament. Elliott went on to play one more super 50 game and two t20 for Jamaica before he suffered a mild stroke in 2013, he never played back since

Elliott has played club cricket in England for Gravesend Cricket Club in the Kent Cricket League during the 2010,2012 and 2014 seasons, and foxton cricket club in 2016,18
