= George Reifer =

Barbadian cricketer (born 1961)

Personal information
- Full name: George Nathaniel Reifer
- Born: 21 March 1961 (age 65); Airy Hill, Saint George, Barbados
- Batting: Right-handed
- Bowling: Left-arm medium
- Relatives: Leslie Reifer (brother); Raymon Reifer (nephew); Elvis Reifer (twin-brother); Leslie Reifer (nephew)
- Source: Cricinfo, 13 November 2020

George Reifer (born 21 March 1961) is a Barbadian cricketer. He played in 12 first-class and 29 List A matches for the Barbados cricket team from 1977 to 1996.

== See also ==
- List of Barbadian representative cricketers
