= Nelson Bolan =

Nevisian cricketer (born 1990)

Personal information
- Full name: Nelson Amos Bolan
- Born: 29 November 1990 (age 35); Tortola, British Virgin Islands
- Batting: Right-handed
- Bowling: Right-arm fast-medium
- Role: Bowling all-rounder

Domestic team information
- Years: Team
- 2008: Nevis
- 2009: West Indies under-19s
- 2012–2019: Leeward Islands

Career statistics
Competition	FC	LA	T20
Matches	9	3	1
Runs scored	49	16	–
Batting average	4.45	16.00	–
100s/50s	0/0	0/0	–
Top score	14*	16*	–
Balls bowled	736	84	–
Wickets	11	2	–
Bowling average	40.54	35.50	–
5 wickets in innings	0	0	–
10 wickets in match	0	0	–
Best bowling	4/43	1/20	–
Catches/stumpings	5/–	0/–	0/–
- Source: CricketArchive, 21 March 2019

Nelson Amos Bolan (born 29 November 1990) is a Nevisian cricketer who has played for the Leeward Islands in West Indian domestic cricket. He is a right-handed batsman and right-arm fast-medium bowler.

Born on Tortola in the British Virgin Islands, Bolan emigrated to Nevis (itself part of the larger Federation of Saint Kitts and Nevis) at an early age, and went on to represent both Nevis and the Leeward Islands in regional underage tournaments. Considered an all-rounder, he made his Twenty20 debut for Nevis against Montserrat in the 2008 edition of the Stanford 20/20 competition. Aged 17 at the time of the match, he did not bat or bowl during the game, and was not selected for Nevis' fixture in the second round of the tournament. Having represented the Leewards under-19s team in the 2009 West Indies Under-19 Challenge, Bolan was one of two Nevisians selected in the West Indies under-19s squad for the 2010 ICC Under-19 World Cup, held in New Zealand. Taking five wickets from his three matches at the tournament, he was sponsored by the Nevis branch of the Caribbean Development Bank, and also received equipment from the Government of Saint Kitts and Nevis.

With the West Indies under-19s included in the 2009–10 WICB President's Cup, Bolan played a single List A match for the team during the competition, taking 1/20 against Barbados. Although remaining active for Nevis in regional competitions, Bolan did not again play representative cricket until the 2011–12 season, when he was named in the Leeward Islands' squad for the first-class Regional Four Day Competition. He went on to play three matches for the side during the season. Bolan made his first-class debut against Guyana, and took 4/43 in the side's second innings, bowling alongside Gavin Tonge. He failed to take a wicket in his second match, which saw the Leewards dismissed for a record low score of 39 all out, with Combined Campuses and Colleges winning by an innings and 15 runs. Bolan played one further match in the 2011–12 season, with Jamaica defeating the Leewards by an innings and 201 runs. The following season, he only participated in the Leewards' final match of the season, taking two wickets against the Windward Islands, although he also played a limited-overs match for the team later in the season.
