= Justin Brathwaite =

Barbadian cricketer (born 1988)

Personal information
- Full name: Kemar Justin Brathwaite
- Born: 3 February 1988 (age 38); Bridgetown, Barbados
- Source: Cricinfo, 11 November 2020

Justin Brathwaite (born 3 February 1988) is a Barbadian cricketer. He played in six Twenty20 matches for the Barbados cricket team in 2013.

== See also ==
- List of Barbadian representative cricketers
