= Alan Hunt (New Zealand cricketer) =

New Zealand cricketer and coach

Personal information
- Full name: Alan James Hunt
- Born: 27 September 1959 (age 67); Dunedin, New Zealand
- Batting: Right-handed
- Bowling: Right-arm off-spin

Domestic team information
- Years: Team
- 1981/82–1992/93: Auckland

Career statistics
| Competition | First-class | List A |
|---|---|---|
| Matches | 67 | 37 |
| Runs scored | 2,128 | 655 |
| Batting average | 24.45 | 24.25 |
| 100s/50s | 1/13 | 0/1 |
| Top score | 102 not out | 68 |
| Balls bowled | 2,550 | 198 |
| Wickets | 28 | 10 |
| Bowling average | 43.78 | 13.40 |
| 5 wickets in innings | 0 | 1 |
| 10 wickets in match | 0 | 0 |
| Best bowling | 4/26 | 5/27 |
| Catches/stumpings | 72/– | 11/– |
- Source: Cricinfo, 6 July 2023

Alan James Hunt (born 27 September 1959) is a former New Zealand cricketer and current coach. He played 67 first-class and 37 List A matches for Auckland between 1980 and 1993.

Hunt was a middle-order batsman and occasional off-spin bowler. His highest first-class score was 102 not out for Auckland against Otago in 1990–91. In List A cricket his best performance was with the ball, when he took 5 for 27 off nine overs against Canterbury in 1985–86. In January 1991 he captained the New Zealand Emerging Players team in a first-class match against the touring Sri Lankans.

Hunt was the coach of Central Districts from 2010–11 to 2012–13; they won The Ford Trophy in 2011–12 and the Plunket Shield in 2012–13. In 2013 he was appointed, along with Lance Cairns, as one of New Zealand Cricket's two high performance talent scouts.
