= Kejel Tyson =

West Indian cricketer (born 1990)

Kejel Kareem Tyson
Personal information
- Born: 26 October 1990 (age 36); Nevis
- Source: Cricinfo, 12 November 2017

Kejel Tyson (born 26 October 1990) is a West Indian cricketer. He played his List A cricket match for West Indies under-19 cricket team in the President's Cup (West Indies) 2009-10 on 28 October 2009.
