= Rashidi Boucher =

Barbadian cricketer (born 1990)

Personal information
- Full name: Rashidi Hasani Boucher
- Born: 17 July 1990 (age 36); Christchurch, Barbados
- Batting: Right-handed

Domestic team information
- Years: Team
- 2008/09–2018/19: Barbados

Career statistics
Competition	FC	LA	T20
Matches	19	12	2
Runs scored	573	180	25
Batting average	18.48	16.36	12.50
100s/50s	0/2	0/0	0/0
Top score	81	25	19
Catches/stumpings	13/–	6/–	0/–
- Source: Cricinfo, 8 August 2025

Rashidi Hasani Boucher (born 17 July 1990) is a West Indian cricketer. He made his first-class debut for Barbados national cricket team in the 2008–09 Regional Four Day Competition on 30 January 2009.

He played his List A cricket debut for West Indies under-19 cricket team in the 2007-08 KFC Cup on 17 October 2007. He made his Twenty20 debut for Barbados national cricket team in the Caribbean T20 on 21 January 2011.
