= Elvis Reifer =

West Indian cricketer

Personal information
- Full name: Elvis Leroy Reifer
- Born: 21 March 1961; Saint George, Barbados
- Died: 26 August 2011 (aged 50); Bridgetown, Barbados
- Batting: Left-handed
- Bowling: Left-arm fast-medium
- Relatives: Raymon Reifer (son); George Reifer (twin-brother); Leslie Reifer (brother); Floyd Reifer (nephew)

Domestic team information
- Years: Team
- 1984: Hampshire
- 1984/85–1985/86: Barbados

Career statistics
Competition	First-class	List A
Matches	21	19
Runs scored	408	97
Batting average	22.66	9.70
100s/50s	–/1	–/–
Top score	51*	24
Balls bowled	3,221	899
Wickets	49	19
Bowling average	36.95	34.26
5 wickets in innings	–	–
10 wickets in match	–	–
Best bowling	4/43	4/46
Catches/stumpings	6/–	3/–
- Source: Cricinfo, 7 December 2009

Elvis Leroy Reifer (21 March 1961 – 26 August 2011) was a Barbadian cricketer.

Reifer was born in Barbados at Saint George in March 1961, alongside his twin-brother George. He was educated at Saint George Secondary School. Reifer was a key member of the Pickwick Cricket Club in the early 1980s, where as a left-arm fast-medium bowler he opened the bowling alongside Odwin Gilkes. He was signed by Hampshire for the 1984 English season as a replacement for Milton Small, who had been called up to the West Indian team prior to his arrival. He made his debut in first-class cricket for Hampshire against Cambridge University at Fenner's, taking 4 for 43. Reifer made twenty first-class appearances during his one season at Hampshire, taking 49 wickets at an average of 35.93, with his best figures remaining those he took on debut. With the bat, he scored 357 runs at a batting average of 19.83, with a highest score of 47. In addition to playing first-class cricket for Hampshire, Reifer also made his debut in List A one-day cricket for the county against the Combined Universities cricket team in the 1984 Benson & Hedges Cup. He made sixteen one-day appearances for Hampshire, taking 19 wickets at an average of 28.73, with best figures of 4 for 46. Wisden noted that "although bowling well on occasions, he did not make the hoped-for impact", and so was not retained for the 1985 season.

Returning to Barbados, Reifer made a single first-class appearance for Barbados against Trinidad and Tobago in the 1985–86 Shell Shield. Despite going wicketless in the match, he did make an unbeaten half century batting at number ten in the Barbados first innings. He also made three one-day appearances for Barbados in the 1985–86 Geddes Grant/Harrison Line Trophy, but failed to take a wicket in these matches. Reifer died in his sleep on 26 August 2011 at Bridgetown. He was married to Carol Roberts-Reifer, a well known radio and television personality in Barbados, with their son Raymon playing international cricket for the West Indies. Besides his twin-brother, his elder brother, Leslie, also played first-class and one-day cricket for Barbados. His nephew, Floyd Reifer, is a former captain of the West Indies cricket team.
