= Austin Richards =

West Indian cricketer (born 1983)

Personal information
- Born: 14 November 1983 (age 42); Freetown, Antigua
- Batting: Left-handed
- Bowling: Right-arm medium

International information
- National side: West Indies (2007)
- Only ODI (cap 135): 12 July 2007 v Scotland
- Only T20I (cap 17): 29 June 2007 v England

Career statistics
Competition	ODI	T20I	FC	LA
Matches	1	1	27	33
Runs scored	2	10	1336	725
Batting average	2.00	10.00	26.19	21.96
100s/50s	0/0	0/0	1/6	1/3
Top score	2	10	183	141
Catches/stumpings	1/0	0/0	13/0	10/0
- Source: ESPNcricinfo, 5 October 2019

Austin Conroy Lenroy Richards (born 14 November 1983) is a West Indies cricketer who plays for the Leeward Islands. He earned his first international call up when he was named in the West Indian side for a One Day International series in England in 2007.
