= 1974 John Player League =

- Administrator: Test and County Cricket Board
- Cricket format: Limited overs cricket (40 overs per innings)
- Tournament format: League
- Champions: Leicestershire (1st title)
- Participants: 17
- Matches: 136
- Most runs: 618 Clive Radley (Middlesex)
- Most wickets: 34 Bob Clapp (Somerset)

The 1974 John Player League was the sixth competing of what was generally known as the Sunday League. The competition was won for the first time by Leicestershire County Cricket Club.

== Standings ==
Team	Pld	W	T	L	N/R	A	Pts	R/R
Leicestershire (C)	16	12	1	1	1	1	54	4.787
Somerset	16	12	0	2	1	1	52	4.718
Kent	16	10	0	4	1	1	44	4.502
Hampshire	16	9	0	5	0	2	40	4.516
Northamptonshire	16	10	0	6	0	0	40	4.349
Sussex	16	8	1	6	0	1	36	4.24
Yorkshire	16	8	0	6	1	1	36	4.329
Middlesex	16	7	1	7	0	1	32	4.324
Worcestershire	16	7	0	7	1	1	32	4.569
Surrey	16	7	0	8	0	1	30	4.407
Warwickshire	16	7	0	8	0	1	30	4.423
Gloucestershire	16	4	0	8	2	2	24	4.221
Lancashire	16	5	1	9	1	0	24	4.09
Glamorgan	16	5	0	10	0	1	22	3.937
Derbyshire	16	4	0	11	0	1	18	4.17
Essex	16	4	0	11	0	1	18	3.893
Nottinghamshire	16	3	0	13	0	0	12	4.064
Team marked (C) finished as champions. Source: CricketArchive

== See also ==
Sunday League
