= International cricket in 1997 =

International cricket season

The 1997 international cricket season was from May 1997 to September 1997.

== Season overview ==
International tours
Start date	Home team	Away team	Results [Matches]			
Start date	Home team	Away team	Test	ODI	FC	LA
22 May 1997	England	Australia	2–3 [6]	3–0 [3]	—	—
13 June 1997	West Indies	Sri Lanka	1–0 [2]	1–0 [1]	—	—
2 August 1997	Sri Lanka	India	0–0 [2]	3–0 [3]	—	—
International tournaments
Start date	Tournament				Winners	
9 May 1997	(India) 1997 Pepsi Independence Cup				Sri Lanka	
14 July 1997	(Sri Lanka) 1997 Asia Cup				Sri Lanka	
13 September 1997	(Canada) 1997 'Friendship' Cup				India	

== May ==
=== Pepsi Independence Cup 1997 ===
Team	P	W	L	T	NR	NRR	Points
Sri Lanka	3	2	1	0	0	+0.478	4
Pakistan	3	2	1	0	0	−0.287	4
India	3	1	2	0	0	−0.331	2
New Zealand	3	1	2	0	0	−0.452	2

Group stage
No.	Date	Team 1	Captain 1	Team 2	Captain 2	Venue	Result
ODI 1204	9 May	New Zealand	Stephen Fleming	Pakistan	Rameez Raja	Punjab Cricket Association IS Bindra Stadium, Mohali	New Zealand by 22 runs
ODI 1205	12 May	Pakistan	Rameez Raja	Sri Lanka	Arjuna Ranatunga	Captain Roop Singh Stadium, Gwalior	Pakistan by 30 runs
ODI 1206	14 May	India	Sachin Tendulkar	New Zealand	Stephen Fleming	M. Chinnaswamy Stadium, Bangalore	India by 8 wickets
ODI 1207	17 May	India	Sachin Tendulkar	Sri Lanka	Arjuna Ranatunga	Wankhede Stadium, Mumbai	Sri Lanka by 5 wickets
ODI 1208	20 May	New Zealand	Stephen Fleming	Sri Lanka	Arjuna Ranatunga	Lal Bahadur Shastri Stadium, Hyderabad	Sri Lanka by 52 runs
ODI 1209	21 May	India	Sachin Tendulkar	Pakistan	Rameez Raja	MA Chidambaram Stadium, Chennai	Pakistan by 35 runs
Finals
No.	Date	Team 1	Captain 1	Team 2	Captain 2	Venue	Result
ODI 1212	24 May	Pakistan	Rameez Raja	Sri Lanka	Arjuna Ranatunga	Punjab Cricket Association IS Bindra Stadium, Mohali	Sri Lanka by 115 runs
ODI 1214	27 May	Pakistan	Rameez Raja	Sri Lanka	Arjuna Ranatunga	Eden Gardens, Kolkata	Sri Lanka by 85 runs

=== Australia in England ===
Texaco Trophy - ODI series
No.	Date	Home captain	Away captain	Venue	Result
ODI 1210	22 May	Mike Atherton	Mark Taylor	Headingley Cricket Ground, Leeds	England by 6 wickets
ODI 1211	24 May	Mike Atherton	Mark Taylor	The Oval, London	England by 6 wickets
ODI 1213	25 May	Mike Atherton	Steve Waugh	Lord's, London	England by 6 wickets
The Ashes Test series
No.	Date	Home captain	Away captain	Venue	Result
Test 1368	5–8 June	Mike Atherton	Mark Taylor	Edgbaston Cricket Ground, Birmingham	England by 9 wickets
Test 1370	19–23 June	Mike Atherton	Mark Taylor	Lord's, London	Match drawn
Test 1372	3–7 July	Mike Atherton	Mark Taylor	Old Trafford Cricket Ground, Manchester	Australia by 268 runs
Test 1373	24–28 July	Mike Atherton	Mark Taylor	Headingley Cricket Ground, Leeds	Australia by an innings and 61 runs
Test 1375	7–10 August	Mike Atherton	Mark Taylor	Trent Bridge, Nottingham	Australia by 264 runs
Test 1377	21–23 August	Mike Atherton	Mark Taylor	The Oval, London	England by 19 runs

== June ==
=== Sri Lanka in the West Indies ===
One-off ODI series
No.	Date	Home captain	Away captain	Venue	Result
ODI 1215	6 June	Courtney Walsh	Arjuna Ranatunga	Headingley Cricket Ground, Leeds	West Indies by 35 runs
Test series
No.	Date	Home captain	Away captain	Venue	Result
Test 1369	5–8 June	Courtney Walsh	Arjuna Ranatunga	Antigua Recreation Ground, St John's	West Indies by 6 wickets
Test 1371	20–24 June	Courtney Walsh	Arjuna Ranatunga	Arnos Vale Ground, Kingstown	Match drawn

== July ==
=== Asia Cup 1997 ===
	Pld	W	L	T	NR	Pts	NRR
Sri Lanka	3	3	0	0	0	6	1.035
India	3	1	1	0	1	3	1.405
Pakistan	3	1	1	0	1	3	0.940
Bangladesh	3	0	3	0	0	0	-2.895

Group stage
No.	Date	Team 1	Captain 1	Team 2	Captain 2	Venue	Result
ODI 1216	14 July	Sri Lanka	Arjuna Ranatunga	Pakistan	Rameez Raja	R Premadasa Stadium, Colombo	Sri Lanka by 15 runs
ODI 1217	16 July	Bangladesh	Akram Khan	Pakistan	Rameez Raja	R Premadasa Stadium, Colombo	Pakistan by 109 runs
ODI 1218	18 July	Sri Lanka	Arjuna Ranatunga	India	Sachin Tendulkar	R Premadasa Stadium, Colombo	Sri Lanka by 6 wickets
ODI 1219	20 July	India	Sachin Tendulkar	Pakistan	Rameez Raja	Sinhalese Sports Club Ground, Colombo	No result
ODI 1219a	21 July	India	Sachin Tendulkar	Pakistan	Rameez Raja	Sinhalese Sports Club Ground, Colombo	Match abandoned
ODI 1220	22 July	Sri Lanka	Arjuna Ranatunga	Bangladesh	Akram Khan	Sinhalese Sports Club Ground, Colombo	Sri Lanka by 6 wickets
ODI 1221	22 July	Bangladesh	Akram Khan	India	Sachin Tendulkar	Sinhalese Sports Club Ground, Colombo	India by 9 wickets
Final
No.	Date	Team 1	Captain 1	Team 2	Captain 2	Venue	Result
ODI 1222	26 July	Sri Lanka	Arjuna Ranatunga	India	Sachin Tendulkar	R Premadasa Stadium, Colombo	Sri Lanka by 8 wickets

== August ==
=== India in Sri Lanka ===
Test series
No.	Date	Home captain	Away captain	Venue	Result
Test 1374	2–6 August	Arjuna Ranatunga	Sachin Tendulkar	R Premadasa Stadium, Colombo	Match drawn
Test 1376	9–13 August	Arjuna Ranatunga	Sachin Tendulkar	Sinhalese Sports Club Ground, Colombo	Match drawn
ODI series
No.	Date	Home captain	Away captain	Venue	Result
ODI 1223	17 August	Arjuna Ranatunga	Sachin Tendulkar	R Premadasa Stadium, Colombo	Sri Lanka by 2 runs
ODI 1224	20 August	Arjuna Ranatunga	Sachin Tendulkar	R Premadasa Stadium, Colombo	Sri Lanka by 7 wickets
ODI 1225	23 August	Arjuna Ranatunga	Sachin Tendulkar	Sinhalese Sports Club Ground, Colombo	No result
ODI 1226	24 August	Arjuna Ranatunga	Sachin Tendulkar	Sinhalese Sports Club Ground, Colombo	Sri Lanka by 9 runs

== September ==
=== Sahara Cup 1997 ===
Friendship Cup
No.	Date	Team 1	Captain 1	Team 2	Captain 2	Venue	Result
ODI 1227	13 September	India	Sachin Tendulkar	Pakistan	Rameez Raja	Toronto Cricket, Skating and Curling Club, Toronto	India by 20 runs
ODI 1228	14 September	India	Sachin Tendulkar	Pakistan	Rameez Raja	Toronto Cricket, Skating and Curling Club, Toronto	India by 7 wickets
ODI 1229	17 September	India	Sachin Tendulkar	Pakistan	Rameez Raja	Toronto Cricket, Skating and Curling Club, Toronto	No result
ODI 1230	18 September	India	Sachin Tendulkar	Pakistan	Rameez Raja	Toronto Cricket, Skating and Curling Club, Toronto	India by 34 runs
ODI 1231	20 September	India	Sachin Tendulkar	Pakistan	Rameez Raja	Toronto Cricket, Skating and Curling Club, Toronto	India by 7 wickets
ODI 1232	21 September	India	Sachin Tendulkar	Pakistan	Rameez Raja	Toronto Cricket, Skating and Curling Club, Toronto	Pakistan by 5 wickets
