= Craig Thyssen =

South African cricketer (born 1984)

Craig Andre Thyssen (born 25 March 1984 in Port Elizabeth) is a South African first class cricketer for the Warriors. He is a right-handed middle-order batsman and occasional right arm medium pace bowler. He achieved his highest first class score of 200 against the Chevrolet Knights (formerly Eagles) in Kimberly.

== Career ==
Thyssen first made his debut in franchise cricket for the Chevrolet Knights (formerly Eagles). He was noted to be a special talent with his big hitting, athletic fielding and a useful bowler. However, Thyssen never pushed on his ability and was struggled to find a regular spot in the team.

Thyssen then moved to Port Elizabeth; his place of birth, and signed a contract with the Warriors. Since then, Thyssen has established himself as a pure limited overs cricketer and was selected to play in the Champions League T20 series in 2010.

He also plays for Penicuik Cricket Club in ESCA Championship in Scotland as player-cum-coach.
