= Nkrumah Bonner =

Jamaican cricketer

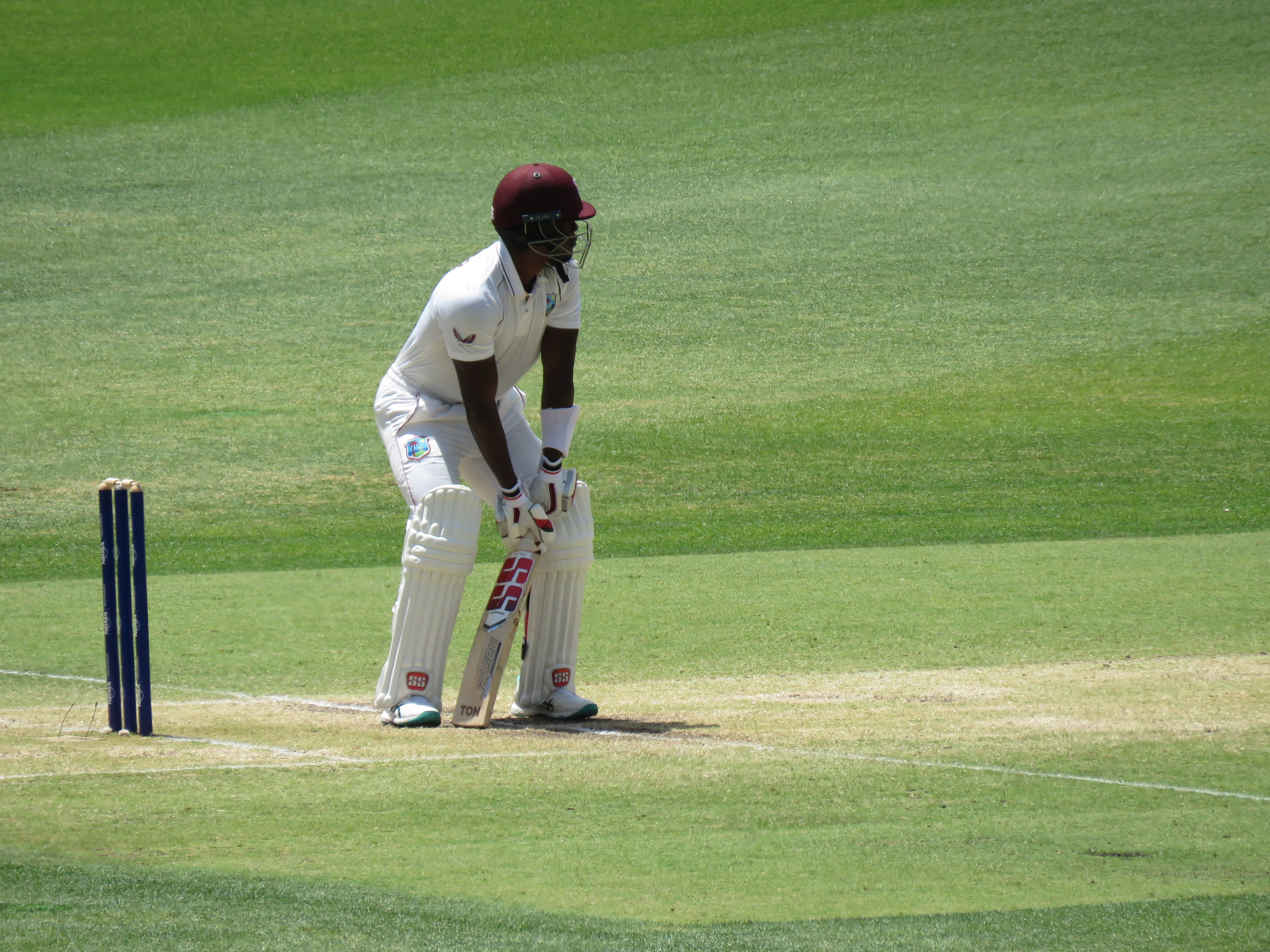
- Nkrumah Bonner batting during the First Test Australia versus West Indies at Perth Stadium, 2 December 2022

Personal information
- Full name: Nkrumah Eljego Bonner
- Born: 23 January 1989 (age 37); Saint Catherine, Jamaica
- Batting: Right-handed
- Bowling: Right-arm leg break
- Role: Middle-order batter

International information
- National side: West Indies (2011–2022)
- Test debut (cap 323): 3 February 2021 v Bangladesh
- Last Test: 30 November 2022 v Australia
- ODI debut (cap 197): 20 January 2021 v Bangladesh
- Last ODI: 4 June 2022 v Netherlands
- ODI shirt no.: 89
- T20I debut (cap 47): 23 September 2011 v England
- Last T20I: 27 March 2012 v Australia
- T20I shirt no.: 89

Domestic team information
- Years: Team
- 2009/10–2014/15: Jamaica
- 2010/11–2011/12: Combined Campuses and Colleges
- 2013–2016: Jamaica Tallawahs
- 2015/16–2017/18: Leeward Islands
- 2018/19–present: Jamaica
- 2020–present: Jamaica Tallawahs

Career statistics
Competition	Test	ODI	FC	LA
Matches	10	3	80	67
Runs scored	738	51	4,145	1,956
Batting average	49.20	17.00	29.82	34.31
100s/50s	2/3	0/0	5/22	4/11
Top score	123	31	135	122*
Balls bowled	78	17	2,627	684
Wickets	1	0	46	27
Bowling average	69.00	–	33.23	19.74
5 wickets in innings	0	–	1	0
10 wickets in match	0	–	0	0
Best bowling	1/16	–	5/26	3/21
Catches/stumpings	10/–	0/–	62/–	24/–
- Source: ESPNcricinfo, 1 December 2022

Nkrumah Eljego Bonner (born 23 January 1989) is a Jamaican cricketer who plays international cricket for the West Indies. An occasional leg spin bowler and top order right-hand batsman, Bonner made his first-class cricket debut for Jamaica against Combined Campuses and Colleges in February 2011.

Bonner was selected as part of the West Indies team to tour England in 2011. In October 2019, he was named in Jamaica's squad for the 2019–20 Regional Super50 tournament.

In June 2020, Bonner was named in the West Indies' Test squad, for their series against England. The Test series was originally scheduled to start in May 2020, but was moved back to July 2020 due to the COVID-19 pandemic. In July 2020, he was named in the Jamaica Tallawahs squad for the 2020 Caribbean Premier League.

In December 2020, Bonner was named in the West Indies' Test and One Day International (ODI) squads for their series against Bangladesh. He made his ODI debut for the West Indies, against Bangladesh, on 20 January 2021. He made his Test debut for the West Indies, also against Bangladesh, on 3 February 2021. In May 2021, Bonner was awarded with a central contract from Cricket West Indies.
