= Leslie Reifer (umpire) =

Barbadian cricket umpire (born 1989)

Personal information
- Full name: Leslie St Auburn Reifer
- Born: 5 September 1989 (age 37); Cottage, St George, Barbados
- Role: Umpire
- Relatives: Leslie Reifer (father); Elvis Reifer (uncle); George Reifer (uncle); Floyd Reifer (cousin); Raymon Reifer (cousin)

Umpiring information
- ODIs umpired: 34 (2017–2025)
- T20Is umpired: 49 (2016–2026)
- WODIs umpired: 7 (2017–2022)
- WT20Is umpired: 3 (2013–2022)
- Source: Cricinfo, 21 June 2023

Leslie St Auburn Reifer (born 5 September 1989) is a Barbadian cricket umpire. His father Leslie Reifer played for Barbados during the 1970s and 1980s.

His first Twenty20 International (T20I) match as an umpire was between India and the West Indies at Central Broward Regional Park, Lauderhill, Florida on 28 August 2016. His One Day International (ODI) umpiring debut was in a match played between the West Indies and Afghanistan at the Darren Sammy National Cricket Stadium, Gros Islet on 14 June 2017. The match was washed out with no result. In January 2020, he was named as one of the sixteen umpires for the 2020 Under-19 Cricket World Cup tournament in South Africa.

== See also ==
- List of One Day International cricket umpires
- List of Twenty20 International cricket umpires
