= Simon Jackson (cricketer) =

Jamaican cricketer (born 1985)

Personal information
- Born: 18 May 1985 (age 41); Jamaica
- Batting: Left-handed
- Bowling: Right-arm leg spin

Domestic team information
- Years: Team
- 2008–2010: Combined Campuses
- 2011–2013: Jamaica
- Source: CricketArchive, 12 January 2016

Simon Jackson (born 18 May 1985) is a Jamaican cricketer who has played for both Jamaica and the Combined Campuses and Colleges in West Indian domestic cricket.

Jackson made his List A debut in October 2007, playing for the Combined Campuses in the 2007–08 KFC Cup. His first-class debut came the following year for the same team, in the 2007–08 Carib Beer Cup. Jackson finished his debut first-class season with 406 runs from six matches, making him his team's leading run-scorer (and fifth in the competition). He remained with Combined Campuses through to the 2009–10 season, but did not regain his prior form. The following season, Jackson switched to play for his home country, Jamaica. His most recent matches for the team came in April 2013, during the 2012–13 Regional Four Day Competition.
