= Gibran Mohammed =

Trinidadian cricketer (born 1983)

Personal information
- Born: 31 July 1983 (age 43); Trinidad
- Source: Cricinfo, 28 November 2020

Gibran Mohammed (born 31 July 1983) is a Trinidadian cricketer. He played in 32 first-class and 6 List A matches for Trinidad and Tobago from 2003 to 2012.

== See also ==
- List of Trinidadian representative cricketers
