= Gavin Wallace =

Jamaican cricketer (born 1984)

Personal information
- Born: 22 December 1984 (age 41)
- Source: Cricinfo, 24 January 2018

Gavin Wallace (born 22 December 1984) is a Jamaican cricketer. He made his first-class debut for the Combined Campuses and Colleges cricket team in the 2007–08 Carib Beer Cup on 29 February 2008. In June 2021, he was selected to take part in the Minor League Cricket tournament in the United States following the players' draft.
