= Raymon Reifer =

Barbadian cricketer

Personal information
- Full name: Raymon Anton Reifer
- Born: 11 May 1991 (age 35); Saint Lucy, Barbados
- Batting: Left-handed
- Bowling: Left-arm medium-fast
- Role: All-rounder
- Relatives: Elvis Reifer (father); Floyd Reifer (cousin); George Reifer (uncle); Leslie Reifer Sr (uncle); Leslie Reifer Jr (cousin); Nico Reifer (cousin)

International information
- National side: West Indies (2017–present)
- Test debut (cap 314): 9 December 2017 v New Zealand
- Last Test: 12 July 2023 v India
- ODI debut (cap 192): 13 May 2019 v Bangladesh
- Last ODI: 9 June 2023 v United Arab Emirates
- T20I debut (cap 93): 5 October 2022 v Australia
- Last T20I: 28 March 2023 v South Africa

Domestic team information
- Years: Team
- 2010/11–2013/14: Combined Campuses and Colleges
- 2014/15–2020/21: Guyana
- 2013–2020: Barbados Tridents (squad no. 87)
- 2015: St Kitts and Nevis Patriots
- 2021: Barbados Royals
- 2021/22: Barbados
- 2024: Comilla Victorians
- 2024/2025: Pokhara Avengers
- 2026: Seattle Orcas

Career statistics
Competition	Test	ODI	T20I	FC
Matches	8	6	3	101
Runs scored	298	51	46	3,989
Batting average	22.92	10.2	23.00	27.13
100s/50s	0/3	0/0	0/0	1/23
Top score	62	27	27	108*
Balls bowled	336	161	30	10,175
Wickets	3	6	1	198
Bowling average	56.66	24.83	60.00	26.13
5 wickets in innings	0	0	0	7
10 wickets in match	0	0	0	0
Best bowling	1/36	2/23	1/42	6/23
Catches/stumpings	5/–	0/–	0/–	47/–
- Source: Cricinfo, 4 April 2025

Raymon Anton Reifer (born 11 May 1991) is a Barbadian cricketer. Reifer is a left-handed batsman who bowls left-arm medium-fast. He was born in Saint Lucy, Barbados. He made his international debut for the West Indies cricket team in December 2017.

== Life and domestic career ==
He is from a family that has a strong cricketing background. His father, Elvis, played first-class and List A cricket for Barbados and Hampshire. His cousin, Floyd, plays for Combined Campuses and Colleges and has previously captained the West Indies in Test and One Day International cricket. His uncle, George, has played first-class and List A cricket for Barbados and has played for Scotland in English domestic cricket. His other uncle, Leslie, has played for Barbados too.

Reifer made his first-class debut for Combined Campuses and Colleges against the Windward Islands in the 2010/11 Regional Four Day Competition. He was picked by the Barbados Tridents as a 9th round pick in the 2017 CPL Draft.

He was the leading run-scorer for Guyana in the 2018–19 Regional Super50 tournament, with 323 runs in nine matches. In October 2019, he was named in Guyana's squad for the 2019–20 Regional Super50 tournament. In July 2020, he was named in the Barbados Tridents squad for the 2020 Caribbean Premier League.

== International career ==
In July 2017, he was named in the West Indies squad for the Test series against England, but he did not play. In October 2017, he was again named in the West Indies Test squad, this time for the series against Zimbabwe, but again he did not play. He made his Test debut for the West Indies against New Zealand on 9 December 2017.

In October 2018, Cricket West Indies (CWI) awarded him a development contract for the 2018–19 season.

In April 2019, he was named in the West Indies' One Day International (ODI) squad for the 2019 Ireland Tri-Nation Series. On 13 May 2019, he made his ODI debut for the West Indies, against Bangladesh, in the fifth match of the tri-series in Ireland.

In May 2019, Cricket West Indies (CWI) named him as one of ten reserve players in the West Indies' squad for the 2019 Cricket World Cup. In June 2020, Reifer was named in the West Indies' Test squad, for their series against England. The Test series was originally scheduled to start in May 2020, but was moved back to July 2020 due to the COVID-19 pandemic.

In September 2022, he was named in the West Indies' T20I squad for the 2022 ICC Men's T20 World Cup and the series against Australia. He made his T20I debut on 3 October 2022, against Australia.
