= Floyd Reifer =

West Indian cricketer (born 1972)

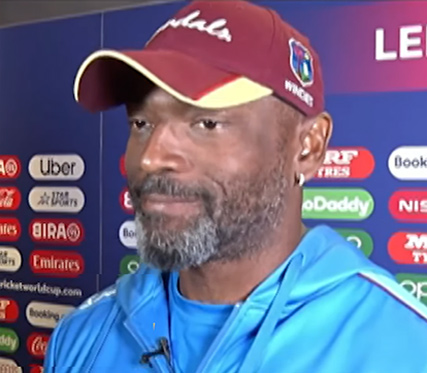
- Floyd Reifer in 2019

Personal information
- Full name: Floyd Lamonte Reifer
- Born: 23 July 1972 (age 54); Christ Church, Barbados
- Nickname: Fly Reifer
- Batting: Left-handed
- Bowling: Right-arm medium
- Role: Batsman
- Relatives: Raymon Reifer (cousin); Elvis Reifer (uncle); Leslie Reifer (cousin)

International information
- National side: West Indies
- Test debut (cap 217): 13 June 1997 v Sri Lanka
- Last Test: 17 July 2009 v Bangladesh
- ODI debut (cap 84): 6 June 1997 v Sri Lanka
- Last ODI: 30 September 2009 v India
- ODI shirt no.: 60
- Only T20I (cap 35): 2 August 2009 v Bangladesh

Domestic team information
- Years: Team
- 1992–2007: Barbados
- 2008–2014: Combined Campuses and Colleges

Career statistics
Competition	Test	ODI	FC	LA
Matches	6	8	154	131
Runs scored	111	117	7,640	3,294
Batting average	9.25	14.62	30.68	30.78
100s/50s	0/0	0/0	13/41	3/17
Top score	29	40	200	130
Balls bowled	–	–	252	251
Wickets	–	–	1	3
Bowling average	–	–	156.00	72.33
5 wickets in innings	–	–	0	0
10 wickets in match	–	–	0	0
Best bowling	–	–	1/19	1/6
Catches/stumpings	6/–	3/–	159/–	39/–
- Source: CricketArchive, 28 December 2018

Floyd Lamonte Reifer (born 23 July 1972) is a Barbadian cricketer and politician. He is a left-handed middle-order batsman and a right-arm medium pace bowler.

Reifer has played six Tests and eight One Day Internationals for the West Indies cricket team, spread over a home tour against Sri Lanka in 1997 and the 2009 edition of the ICC Champions trophy.

Ten years after playing his fourth Test match, Reifer was recalled to play for the West Indies on 9 July 2009. He captained an understrength team fielded by the West Indies against Bangladesh. This 15-man squad included nine uncapped players and seven West Indies players made their Test debut in the 1st Test which was played at Kingstown, St Vincent on 9–13 July 2009. The first XI had made themselves unavailable due to a pay dispute with the West Indies Cricket Board. The West Indies went on to lose the two Test series 2–0 and the three match One Day International series 3–0.

In 2002 Reifer played as an overseas professional for Scottish club team Ferguslie. He also played three matches for the Scottish Saltires as an overseas player in 2004. Of his 145 first-class matches, 85 have been for Barbados, with whom he has won six Carib Beer Cup titles.

== Coaching career ==
Reifer was appointed head coach of the newly formed cricket team called Combined Campuses & Colleges in 2009. He played there as player-cum-coach. In April 2019, he was appointed as a head coach of West Indies national cricket team.

== Politics ==
Reifer is active in Barbadian politics, and contested the 2020 St. George North by-election as the candidate of the opposition Democratic Labour Party.
