= Royston Crandon =

West Indian cricketer (born 1983)

Personal information
- Full name: Royston Tycho Crandon
- Born: 31 May 1983 (age 43); Courtland, Berbice, Guyana
- Batting: Right-handed
- Bowling: Right-arm off-break
- Relatives: Esuan Crandon (brother)

International information
- National side: West Indies
- Only ODI: 30 September 2009 v India
- ODI shirt no.: 43

Domestic team information
- Years: Team
- 2007–present: Guyana

Career statistics
Competition	ODI	FC	LA
Matches	1	17	19
Runs scored	5	830	373
Batting average	5.00	28.62	24.86
100s/50s	0/0	1/5	1/1
Top score	5	136*	101
Balls bowled	–	744	749
Wickets	–	8	20
Bowling average	–	47.25	26.65
5 wickets in innings	–	0	0
10 wickets in match	–	0	0
Best bowling	–	3/39	4/25
Catches/stumpings	0/–	6/–	4/–
- Source: CricketArchive, 4 July 2010

Royston Tycho Crandon (born 31 May 1983) is a West Indian international cricketer. He is a right-handed Batsman and off spin bowler who plays domestically for Guyana. In 2009 Crandon made his ODI debut for the West Indies. He is the brother of Esuan Crandon, who also plays for Guyana.
