= Garey Mathurin =

West Indian cricketer (born 1983)

Personal information
- Full name: Garey Earl Mathurin
- Born: 22 September 1983 (age 43); Mon Repos, Saint Lucia
- Batting: Left-handed
- Bowling: Slow left-arm orthodox

International information
- National side: West Indies (2011–2012)
- T20I shirt no.: 86

Domestic team information
- Years: Team
- 2006–2007/08: Saint Lucia
- 2006/07–2013/14: Windward Islands
- 2013–2014: Saint Lucia Kings
- 2016–2017: Jamaica Tallawahs

Career statistics
Competition	T20I	FC	LA
Matches	3	22	20
Runs scored	4	360	104
Batting average	–	10.90	11.55
100s/50s	0/0	0/0	0/0
Top score	3*	32	29*
Balls bowled	60	3,751	1016
Wickets	4	67	14
Bowling average	16.25	22.97	53.35
5 wickets in innings	0	3	0
10 wickets in match	0	1	0
Best bowling	3/9	7/72	3/38
Catches/stumpings	1/–	21/–	7/–
- Source: ESPNcricinfo, 31 July 2025

Garey Earl Mathurin (born 23 September 1983 in Mon Repos, Saint Lucia) is a former cricketer who played three Twenty20 Internationals for the West Indies and appeared for the Windward Islands domestically.

He made his Twenty20 International debut for the West Indies on 25 September 2011 against England. He finished with bowling figures of 3/9 and was named as the player of the match. He is just the third cricketer from Saint Lucia to represent the West Indies in international cricket after Johnson Charles (who made his debut just two days before Mathurin) and Darren Sammy, who was captain in Mathurin's first match.
