= Danza Hyatt =

Jamaican cricketer (born 1983)

Personal information
- Full name: Danza Pacino Hyatt
- Born: 17 March 1983 (age 43); Saint Catherine, Jamaica
- Batting: Right-handed
- Bowling: Right-arm medium
- Role: Allrounder

International information
- National side: West Indies (2011–2012)
- ODI debut (cap 160): 11 June 2011 v India
- Last ODI: 8 December 2011 v India
- ODI shirt no.: 56
- T20I debut (cap 44): 21 April 2011 v Pakistan
- Last T20I: 30 March 2012 v Australia

Domestic team information
- Years: Team
- 2004–2011: Jamaica

Career statistics
Competition	ODI	T20I	FC	LA
Matches	6	4	38	25
Runs scored	6	58	1,766	515
Batting average	16.20	19.33	27.16	28.61
100s/50s	0/0	0	1/13	1/0
Top score	39	28	104	102
Balls bowled	–	–	240	84
Wickets	–	–	3	1
Bowling average	–	–	50.66	48.00
5 wickets in innings	–	–	0	0
10 wickets in match	–	–	0	0
Best bowling	–	–	2/46	1/32
Catches/stumpings	1/–	3/–	31/–	10/–
- Source: ESPNcricinfo, 9 March 2020

Danza Pacino Hyatt (born 17 March 1983) is a Jamaican cricketer. A right-hand batsman and occasional medium pace bowler, Hyatt made his first-class cricket debut for West Indies B against Kenya in January 2004. He made his One Day International debut for the West Indies against India at Sir Vivian Richards Stadium in Antigua and Barbuda on 11 May 2011.

Hyatt was selected as part of the West Indies cricket team to tour England in 2011.
