= Esuan Crandon =

West Indian cricketer (born 1981)

Personal information
- Full name: Esuan Asqui Crandon
- Born: 17 December 1981 (age 44); Rose Hall, Berbice, Guyana
- Batting: Left-handed
- Bowling: Right-arm fast

Domestic team information
- Years: Team
- 2000/01–2010/11: Guyana

Career statistics
Competition	FC	LA	T20
Matches	38	28	18
Runs scored	702	119	173
Batting average	14.62	9.15	14.41
100s/50s	0/1	0/0	-/1
Top score	51*	31*	71
Balls bowled	5,326	1,143	372
Wickets	90	29	14
Bowling average	32.02	28.13	33.71
5 wickets in innings	3	0	0
10 wickets in match	0	0	0
Best bowling	7/125	3/28	2/20
Catches/stumpings	11/–	8/–	7/–
- Source: Cricinfo, 20 May 2022

Esuan Asqui Crandon (born 17 December 1981) is a first class cricketer who played for Guyana. A right arm fast bowler, Crandon debuted in 2000/01 and has career best innings figures of 7/125. He is known for his skiddy seamers and being economical in the one day form. He was part of the winning Guyana team in the Stanford 20/20 in 2006 and also the winning Guyanese team in the inaugural Caribbean Twenty 20 in 2010, thus qualifying for the 2010 Champions League in South Africa.

== Career Best Performances ==
as of 13 September 2010

	Batting				Bowling (innings)			
	Score	Fixture	Venue	Season	Figures	Fixture	Venue	Season
FC	51*	Guyana v Windward Islands	St. George's	2010	7/125	Guyana v Trinidad & Tobago	Pointe-à-Pierre	2006
LA	31*	Guyana v Barbados	St. John's	2003	3/28	Guyana v Trinidad & Tobago	Bridgetown	2004
T20	71	Guyana v Jamaica	Coolidge	2006	2/20	Guyana v Jamaica	Coolidge	2008
