= Miles Bascombe =

Vincentian cricketer

Personal information
- Full name: Miles Cameron Bascombe
- Born: 12 January 1986 (age 40); Saint Vincent
- Batting: Right-handed

International information
- National side: West Indies
- Only T20I (cap 50): 25 September 2011 v England

Domestic team information
- Years: Team
- 2007–2015: Windward Islands
- 2009–2011: Combined Campuses
- Source: CricketArchive, 29 December 2015

Miles Cameron Bascombe (born 12 January 1986) is a Vincentian cricketer who played a single Twenty20 International for the West Indies in 2011. In West Indian domestic cricket, he has played for the Windward Islands and the Combined Campuses and Colleges.

Bascombe's first appearance in a West Indian domestic competition came when he played for Saint Vincent and the Grenadines in the 2006 Stanford 20/20, making appearances against the U.S. Virgin Islands and Grenada. The following year, aged 21, he made his debut for the Windward Islands, playing in both the four-day Carib Beer Cup and the one-day KFC Cup. Opening the batting with Heron Campbell on his first-class debut against Trinidad and Tobago, he scored 37 and 53, finishing as his team's leading run-scorer for the match.

Prior to the 2010–11 domestic season, Bascombe switched from the Windward Islands to the Combined Campuses team. After good form at the 2010–11 Caribbean Twenty20, where he led his team in runs, Bascombe was called up to the West Indian squad for a two-match T20I series in England. He featured only in the second game, making three runs from seven balls before being dismissed by Samit Patel. For the 2011–12 Caribbean Twenty20, Bascombe returned to the Windward Islands, although he continued to play for the Combined Campuses in the 2011–12 Regional Super50. Since the 2012–13 season, he has played solely for the Windwards.
