= Derwin Christian =

Guyanese cricketer

Personal information
- Full name: Derwin O'Neil Christian
- Born: 9 May 1983 (age 43); Klien Pouderoyen, Guyana
- Batting: Right-handed
- Role: Wicket-keeper

International information
- National side: West Indies
- T20I debut (cap 49): 23 September 2011 v England
- Last T20I: 25 September 2011 v England

Domestic team information
- Years: Team
- 2005–2013: Guyana
- Source: CricketArchive, 29 December 2015

Derwin O'Neil Christian (born 9 May 1983) is a Guyanese cricketer who played two Twenty20 Internationals for the West Indies in 2011, as a wicket-keeper. In West Indian domestic cricket, he played for the Guyanese national side.

Christian was born in Klien Pouderoyen, in Guyana's Essequibo Islands-West Demerara region. He made his senior debut for Guyana during the 2004–05 Regional One-Day Competition, and his first-class debut the following season, in the 2005–06 Carib Beer Cup. Against Jamaica during the 2008–09 season, Christian scored a maiden first-class century, 113 runs from 125 balls. His innings was made from eighth in the batting order, and he and Travis Dowlin put on 163 runs for the seventh wicket, a record for Guyana–Jamaica matches.

In a match against the Combined Campuses and Colleges in the 2010–11 Caribbean Twenty20, Christian came to the crease at 119/7, with his team requiring another 56 runs from 26 balls. He proceeded to score 40 runs from 13 balls, including two fours and four sixes, helping his team win the game with only two balls to spare. Later in 2011, Christian was called up to the West Indian squad for a two-match T20I series in England. The only wicket-keeper in the squad, he featured in both games, but was only involved in one dismissal, a run out. He batted only in the first match, making a two-ball duck. Christian continued playing for Guyana for several seasons after his international stint, but was dropped from the team midway through the 2012–13 season, in favour of Anthony Bramble. He was not named at all in Guyana's squad for the 2013–14 season, but continued to play club cricket.
