= Bacchus (disambiguation) =

Bacchus is the Roman name for Dionysus, the Greek god of wine and intoxication.

Bacchus may also refer to:

== Art and entertainment ==
- Bacchus (Leonardo), a painting by Leonardo da Vinci of John the Baptist
- Bacchus (Michelangelo), a marble sculpture by Michelangelo
- Bacchus (Jacopo Sansovino), a sculpture by Jacopo Sansovino
- Bacchus (Caravaggio), a painting by Caravaggio
- Bacchus (Rubens), a painting by Rubens
- Bacchus (opera), a 1909 opera by Jules Massenet
- Bacchus (play), a 1951 play by Jean Cocteau
- Bacchus and Ariadne (disambiguation)

== People ==
- Bacchus (surname)
- Bacchus Rolle, Bahamian politician
- Saint Bacchus (3rd century), Roman soldier commemorated as a Christian martyr

== Places ==
- Temple of Bacchus, a Roman temple at a large classical antiquity complex in Baalbek, Lebanon
- Bakos, Alexandria, a neighborhood in Alexandria, Egypt
- Bacchus Marsh, Victoria, a town in Victoria, Australia
- Bacchus, Utah, a ghost town in Salt Lake County, Utah, United States

== Military ==
- Project Bacchus, a covert investigation into bioweapons production with off-the-shelf equipment
- RFA Bacchus, the name of three ships of the Royal Fleet Auxiliary

== Other uses ==
- 2063 Bacchus, an asteroid
- Bacchus (character), a comics character created by Eddie Campbell
- Bacchus (comics), comics character created by Eddie Campbell
- Bacchus (grape), white wine grape variety grown in Germany and England
- Bacchus (1786 ship), a vessel that made five voyages transporting enslaved people
- Bacchus (train), an express train in Germany 1979–1998
- Bacchus Motorcycle Club, an outlaw motorcycle club in Canada
- Bacchus-F, an energy drink from South Korea
- Krewe of Bacchus, an organization that parades during the New Orleans Mardi Gras
- Bacchus Wrath or King Mondo, a fictional character from the American television series Power Rangers Zeo

== See also ==
- Bachus (disambiguation)
- Backus (disambiguation)
- Backhaus, a surname
- Bacchylus
