= National Register of Historic Places listings in Calloway County, Kentucky =

Location of Calloway County in Kentucky

This is a list of the National Register of Historic Places listings in Calloway County, Kentucky. It is intended to be a complete list of the properties and districts on the National Register of Historic Places in Calloway County, Kentucky, United States. The locations of National Register properties and districts for which the latitude and longitude coordinates are included below, may be seen in a map.

There are 18 properties and districts listed on the National Register in the county.

This National Park Service list is complete through NPS recent listings posted April 24, 2026.

== Current listings ==
	Name on the Register	Image	Date listed	Location	City or town	Description
1	Archeological Site 15CW64		July 11, 1985 (#85001506)	Ridgeline ¼ mile southeast of Backusburg, along the Clarks River; 36°42′09″N 88°27′39″W	Backusburg	Also known as the "Backusburg Mounds"
2	Calloway County Courthouse	Calloway County Courthouse	February 19, 1986 (#86000287)	Town Sq. 36°36′37″N 88°18′08″W	Murray	
3	Central Hazel Historic District	Central Hazel Historic District	September 12, 2024 (#100007810)	200-700 Third, 200 blk. Barnettt, 300 blk. Calloway, 100-600 Main, 300 Dees, 301 Center, 215, 241, 306 Gilbert, and 500-600 Fourth Sts., 3581 US 641 South; 36°30′10″N 88°19′34″W	Hazel	
3	Confederate Monument in Murray	Confederate Monument in Murray	July 17, 1997 (#97000711)	Junction of KY 94 and KY 121; 36°36′36″N 88°18′18″W	Murray	
4	Edwin S. Diuguid House	Edwin S. Diuguid House	May 17, 1976 (#76000855)	601 W. Main St. 36°36′38″N 88°18′15″W	Murray	
5	First Baptist Church	First Baptist Church	February 19, 1986 (#86000289)	203 S. 4th St. 36°36′33″N 88°18′05″W	Murray	
6	First Christian Church	First Christian Church	February 19, 1986 (#86000292)	111 N. 5th St. 36°36′41″N 88°18′11″W	Murray	
7	Fort Heiman Site		December 12, 1976 (#76000856)	1.6 miles southeast of New Concord off Fort Heiman Rd. 36°30′00″N 88°03′23″W	New Concord	
8	Will Linn House	Will Linn House	December 4, 1980 (#80001491)	103 N. 6th St. 36°36′40″N 88°18′17″W	Murray	
9	Main Street Historic District	Main Street Historic District	February 19, 1986 (#86000294)	700 and 800 blocks of W. Main St. 36°36′37″N 88°18′21″W	Murray	
10	Murray Commercial Historic District	Murray Commercial Historic District	June 24, 2003 (#02001464)	Roughly bounded by Walnut St., L.P. Miller St., Poplar St. and 6th St. 36°36′37″N 88°18′10″W	Murray	
11	Murray State University Historic Buildings	Murray State University Historic Buildings	August 3, 1978 (#78001307)	15th, 16th, and Main Sts., including the Murray State University campus 36°36′40″N 88°19′23″W	Murray	"Including the MSU campus" represents a boundary increase of May 26, 1983, the Main Library addition
12	The Murray Woman's Club Clubhouse	The Murray Woman's Club Clubhouse	November 10, 2011 (#11000792)	704 Vine St. 36°36′21″N 88°18′21″W	Murray	
13	National Hotel	National Hotel	February 19, 1986 (#86000298)	N. 6th and Main Sts. 36°36′38″N 88°18′14″W	Murray	
14	Old Normal School Building	Old Normal School Building	June 11, 1975 (#75000740)	Murray State University campus 36°36′39″N 88°19′25″W	Murray	
15	Seclusaval		June 10, 1975 (#75000741)	8 miles east of Murray on KY 614; 36°34′39″N 88°09′17″W	Murray	
16	W.G. Swann Tobacco Company		September 29, 2015 (#15000647)	111 Poplar St. 36°36′31″N 88°17′58″W	Murray	
17	US Post Office-Murray	US Post Office-Murray	February 19, 1986 (#86000296)	Maple and S. 4th St. 36°36′35″N 88°18′06″W	Murray	

== See also ==
- List of National Historic Landmarks in Kentucky
- National Register of Historic Places listings in Kentucky
