= Bacchus (surname) =

Bacchus is a surname, and may refer to:

- Carl Bacchus (1904–1985), American football player
- Erich Bacchus (born 1990), American baseball umpire
- Fahiem Bacchus (1957–2022), Canadian computer scientist
- Faoud Bacchus (born 1954), Guyanese cricketer
- George Reginald Bacchus (1874–1945), English writer
- Hassell Bacchus, Trinidad and Tobago politician
- Jim Bacchus (born 1949), American politician and former member of the Appellate Body of the World Trade Organization
- Kamara Bacchus (born 1986), British actress and radio personality
- Peter Bacchus, investment banker
- Robin Bacchus (born 1989), Guyanese cricketer

== See also ==
- Bachus (disambiguation)
- Backus
- Backhouse (surname)
