= Backus (disambiguation) =

Backus is a surname.

Backus may also refer to:

== Places in the United States ==
- Backusburg, Kentucky, an unincorporated community
- Backusburg Mounds, an archeological site in Calloway County, Kentucky
- Backus Beach, Michigan, an unincorporated community
- Backus Township, Michigan
  - Backus Creek State Game Area
- Backus, Minnesota, a city
- Backus, West Virginia, an unincorporated community
- Blennerhassett Island, West Virginia, originally known as Backus Island

== Other uses ==
- William W. Backus Hospital, a community hospital in Norwich, Connecticut
- Backus Water Motor Company of Newark, New Jersey, which produced an early split cycle engine
- Backus and Johnston, a Peruvian brewery

== See also ==
- Bacchus (disambiguation)
- Bachus (disambiguation)
- Backus upscaling, calculating the effective elastic properties of geological layers in petrology
