= Backhouse =

Backhouse may refer to:

- Outhouse, frequently called "backhouse" in Canada
- Backhouse (surname), people with the surname Backhouse
- Backhouse (ship), the name of several ships
- BACKHOUSE, the band

== See also ==
- Backhouse's Bank, Darlington, England
