= 2014 Caribbean Premier League squads =

This is a list of the squads of the teams that participated in the 2014 Caribbean Premier League.

== Antigua Hawksbills ==
No.	Player	Nat	Date of birth	Batting	Bowling style
	Marlon Samuels (c)	(Jamaica)	5 February 1981 (aged 33)	Right	Right-arm off break
	Justin Athanaze	(Antigua and Barbuda)	29 January 1988 (aged 26)	Right	Right-arm off break
	Carlos Brathwaite	(Barbados)	18 July 1988 (aged 25)	Right	Right-arm fast-medium
	Rahkeem Cornwall	(Antigua and Barbuda)	1 February 1993 (aged 21)	Right	Right-arm off break
	Sheldon Cottrell	(Jamaica)	19 August 1989 (aged 24)	Right	Left-arm fast-medium
	Miguel Cummins	(Barbados)	5 September 1990 (aged 23)	Left	Right-arm fast
	Ben Dunk (wk)	(Australia)	11 March 1987 (aged 27)	Left
	David Hussey	(Australia)	15 July 1977 (aged 36)	Right	Right-arm off break
	Danza Hyatt	(Jamaica)	17 March 1983 (aged 31)	Right	Right-arm medium
	Ben Laughlin	(Australia)	3 October 1982 (aged 31)	Right	Right-arm fast-medium
	Orlando Peters	(Antigua and Barbuda)	10 May 1988 (aged 26)	Right	Right-arm medium
	Saeed Ajmal	(Pakistan)	14 October 1977 (aged 36)	Right	Right-arm off break
	Devon Thomas (wk)	(Antigua and Barbuda)	12 November 1989 (aged 24)	Right	Right-arm medium
	Shacaya Thomas	(Jamaica)	25 September 1988 (aged 25)	Right
	Gavin Tonge	(Antigua and Barbuda)	13 January 1983 (aged 31)	Right	Right-arm fast-medium

== Barbados Tridents ==
No.	Player	Nat	Date of birth	Batting	Bowling style
	Kieron Pollard (c)	(Trinidad and Tobago)	12 May 1987 (aged 27)	Right	Right-arm medium
	Jonathan Carter	(Barbados)	16 November 1987 (aged 26)	Left	Right-arm medium
	Shane Dowrich (wk)	(Barbados)	30 October 1991 (aged 22)	Right
	Kirk Edwards	(Barbados)	3 November 1984 (aged 29)	Right	Right-arm off break
	Rayad Emrit	(Trinidad and Tobago)	8 March 1981 (aged 33)	Right	Right-arm medium-fast
	Jason Holder	(Barbados)	5 November 1991 (aged 22)	Right	Right-arm medium-fast
	Akeal Hosein	(Trinidad and Tobago)	23 April 1993 (aged 21)	Left	Slow left-arm orthodox
	Kyle Mayers	(Barbados)	8 September 1992 (aged 21)	Left	Right-arm medium
	Neil McKenzie	(South Africa)	24 November 1975 (aged 38)	Right	Right-arm medium
	Jeevan Mendis	(Sri Lanka)	15 January 1983 (aged 31)	Left	Leg break
	Ashley Nurse	(Barbados)	22 December 1988 (aged 25)	Right	Right-arm off break
	Ravi Rampaul	(Trinidad and Tobago)	15 October 1984 (aged 29)	Left	Right-arm fast-medium
	Raymon Reifer	(Barbados)	11 May 1991 (aged 23)	Left	Left-arm medium-fast
	Shoaib Malik	(Pakistan)	1 February 1982 (aged 32)	Right	Right-arm off break
	Dwayne Smith	(Barbados)	12 April 1983 (aged 31)	Right	Right-arm medium

== Guyana Amazon Warriors ==
No.	Player	Nat	Date of birth	Batting	Bowling style
	Sunil Narine (c)	(Trinidad and Tobago)	26 May 1988 (aged 26)	Right	Right-arm off break
	Robin Bacchus	(Guyana)	27 April 1989 (aged 25)	Left	Right-arm medium
	Christopher Barnwell	(Guyana)	6 January 1987 (aged 27)	Right	Right-arm medium-fast
	Ronsford Beaton	(Guyana)	17 September 1992 (aged 21)	Right	Right-arm fast-medium
	Trevon Griffith	(Guyana)	18 April 1991 (aged 23)	Left	Right-arm off break
	Martin Guptill	(New Zealand)	30 September 1986 (aged 27)	Right	Right-arm off break
	Steven Jacobs	(Guyana)	13 September 1988 (aged 25)	Right	Right-arm off break
	Leon Johnson	(Guyana)	8 August 1987 (aged 26)	Left	Leg break
	Mohammad Hafeez	(Pakistan)	17 October 1980 (aged 33)	Right	Right-arm off break
	Jimmy Neesham	(New Zealand)	17 September 1990 (aged 23)	Left	Right-arm medium
	Veerasammy Permaul	(Guyana)	11 August 1989 (aged 24)	Right	Slow left-arm orthodox
	Denesh Ramdin (wk)	(Trinidad and Tobago)	13 March 1985 (aged 29)	Right
	Krishmar Santokie	(Jamaica)	20 December 1984 (aged 29)	Left	Left-arm medium-fast
	Lendl Simmons	(Trinidad and Tobago)	25 January 1985 (aged 29)	Right	Right-arm medium
	Navin Stewart	(Trinidad and Tobago)	13 June 1983 (aged 31)	Right	Right-arm fast-medium

== Jamaica Tallawahs ==
No.	Player	Nat	Date of birth	Batting	Bowling style
	Chris Gayle (c)	(Jamaica)	21 September 1979 (aged 34)	Left	Right-arm off break
	Carlton Baugh (wk)	(Jamaica)	23 June 1982 (aged 32)	Right
	David Bernard	(Jamaica)	19 July 1981 (aged 32)	Right	Right-arm medium-fast
	Jermaine Blackwood	(Jamaica)	20 November 1991 (aged 22)	Right	Right-arm off break
	Nkrumah Bonner	(Jamaica)	23 January 1989 (aged 25)	Right	Leg break
	Odean Brown	(Jamaica)	8 February 1982 (aged 32)	Right	Leg break
	Nikita Miller	(Jamaica)	16 May 1982 (aged 32)	Right	Slow left-arm orthodox
	Andrew Richardson	(Jamaica)	6 September 1981 (aged 32)	Left	Right-arm fast-medium
	Andre Russell	(Jamaica)	29 April 1988 (aged 26)	Right	Right-arm fast
	Owais Shah	(England)	22 October 1978 (aged 35)	Right	Right-arm off break
	Jerome Taylor	(Jamaica)	22 June 1984 (aged 30)	Right	Right-arm fast
	Rusty Theron	(South Africa)	24 June 1985 (aged 29)	Right	Right-arm medium-fast
	Daniel Vettori	(New Zealand)	27 January 1979 (aged 35)	Left	Slow left-arm orthodox
	Adam Voges	(Australia)	4 October 1979 (aged 34)	Right	Slow left-arm orthodox
	Chadwick Walton (wk)	(Jamaica)	3 July 1985 (aged 29)	Right

== St Lucia Zouks ==
No.	Player	Nat	Date of birth	Batting	Bowling style
	Darren Sammy (c)	(Saint Lucia)	20 December 1983 (aged 30)	Right	Right-arm medium-fast
	Sunil Ambris	(Saint Vincent and the Grenadines)	23 March 1993 (aged 21)	Right
	Tino Best	(Barbados)	26 August 1981 (aged 32)	Right	Right-arm fast
	Johnson Charles (wk)	(Saint Lucia)	14 January 1989 (aged 25)	Right
	Henry Davids	(South Africa)	19 January 1980 (aged 34)	Right	Right-arm medium-fast
	Andre Fletcher (wk)	(Grenada)	28 November 1987 (aged 26)	Right
	Keddy Lesporis	(Saint Lucia)	27 December 1988 (aged 25)	Right	Right-arm off break
	Mervin Mathew	(Dominica)	23 September 1985 (aged 28)	Right	Right-arm fast-medium
	Garey Mathurin	(Saint Lucia)	23 September 1983 (aged 30)	Left	Slow left-arm orthodox
	Kevin Pietersen	(England)	27 June 1980 (aged 34)	Right	Right-arm off break
	Liam Sebastien	(Dominica)	9 September 1984 (aged 29)	Left	Right-arm off break
	Shane Shillingford	(Dominica)	22 February 1983 (aged 31)	Right	Right-arm off break
	Sohail Tanvir	(Pakistan)	12 December 1984 (aged 29)	Left	Left-arm medium-fast
	Roelof van der Merwe	(South Africa)	31 December 1984 (aged 29)	Right	Slow left-arm orthodox
	Tonito Willett	(Saint Kitts)	6 February 1983 (aged 31)	Right	Right-arm medium-fast

== The Red Steel ==
No.	Player	Nat	Date of birth	Batting	Bowling style
	Dwayne Bravo (c)	(Trinidad and Tobago)	7 October 1983 (aged 30)	Right	Right-arm medium-fast
	Samuel Badree	(Trinidad and Tobago)	9 March 1981 (aged 33)	Right	Leg break
	Sulieman Benn	(Barbados)	22 July 1981 (aged 32)	Left	Slow left-arm orthodox
	Darren Bravo	(Trinidad and Tobago)	6 February 1989 (aged 25)	Left	Right-arm medium-fast
	Kevon Cooper	(Trinidad and Tobago)	16 February 1989 (aged 23)	Right	Right-arm medium
	Fidel Edwards	(Barbados)	6 February 1982 (aged 32)	Right	Right-arm fast
	Shannon Gabriel	(Trinidad and Tobago)	28 April 1988 (aged 26)	Right	Right-arm fast-medium
	Delorn Johnson	(Saint Vincent and the Grenadines)	15 September 1988 (aged 25)	Left	Left-arm fast
	Kennar Lewis	(Jamaica)	18 August 1991 (aged 22)	Right
	Evin Lewis	(Trinidad and Tobago)	27 December 1991 (aged 22)	Left
	Jason Mohammed	(Trinidad and Tobago)	23 September 1986 (aged 27)	Right	Right-arm off break
	Nasir Jamshed	(Pakistan)	6 December 1989 (aged 24)	Left
	Kevin O'Brien	(Republic of Ireland)	4 March 1984 (aged 30)	Right	Right-arm medium-fast
	Nicholas Pooran (wk)	(Trinidad and Tobago)	2 October 1995 (aged 18)	Left
	Ross Taylor	(New Zealand)	8 March 1984 (aged 30)	Right	Right-arm off break
