= Leviathan III =

19th studio album by Therion

Studio album by Therion
- Released: 15 December 2023
- Genre: Symphonic metal
- Length: 52:39
- Label: Napalm Records

Therion chronology
Leviathan II (2022)	Leviathan III (2023)

Leviathan III is the nineteenth studio album by Swedish symphonic metal band Therion. It was released on 15 December 2023 by Napalm Records. It is the third and final part in the Leviathan trilogy, whose preceding albums, Leviathan and Leviathan II, were released on 2021 and 2022 respectively.

Band leader Christofer Johnsson stated that this closure of the Leviathan trilogy would compile the most "experimental and adventurous" songs from that songwriting period.

== Lyrical themes ==
The third part of the Leviathan Trilogy focuses on the apocalyptic themes, odes to the rulers of the underworld as well as on the mystical rituals of several mythologies and traditions from around the world.

- Ninkigal refers to Sumerian goddess Ereshkigal and her title of "Lady of the Great Earth" as a force of destruction.
- Ruler of Tamag tells the legend of Erlik, ruler of hell in Turkish mythology.
- An Unsung Lament talks about the resurrection of Greek deity Pan.
- Maleficium is about the dark rituals of necromancy and witchcraft.
- Ayahuasca talks about the rituals of consumption of said hallucinogenic substance and the mystical awakening of the inner cosmic serpent.
- Baccanale centers on the Greek festival to the god Baccus, of the same name.
- Midsommarblot is about the Pagan holiday of Summer solstice.
- What Was Lost Shall Be Lost No More is about the struggle of demon Astaroth to make a return from the abyss and recover his treasures and glory.
- Duende is about the spirit from Flamenco tradition, that possesses dancers and musicians as a mean of inspiration.
- Nummo is about the fish-like spirits from Dogon cosmogony and their realm beyond the stars.
- Twilight Of The Gods chronicles the prophecy of Ragnarok and its aftermath from Norse mythology.
- The album cover art features a portal with a Leviathan cross – a double cross (‡) on top of an infinity sign (∞) –, a symbol commonly used in Satanism.

== Reception ==
Professional ratings
Review scores
Source	Rating
AllMusic	4/5 stars
Metal Crypt	3/5 stars
Metal Injection	8.5/10
Blabbermouth.net	8/10

AllMusic commended the album for being "ambitious", and said that, while the album was somewhat hard to grasp, repeated listens to it were "rewarding", as Leviathan III was "easily one of Therion's most diverse, dramatic, and dynamic recordings yet".

== Track listing ==
Leviathan III - Standard edition
No.	Title	Length
1.	"Ninkigal"	3:06
2.	"Ruler of Tamag"	6:44
3.	"An Unsung Lament"	6:58
4.	"Maleficium"	3:34
5.	"Ayahuasca"	7:57
6.	"Baccanale"	3:52
7.	"Midsommarblot"	3:04
8.	"What Was Lost Shall Be Lost No More"	3:59
9.	"Duende"	4:18
10.	"Nummo"	2:30
11.	"Twilight of the Gods"	6:23
Total length:		52:39

Leviathan III - Producers Edition
No.	Title	Length
12.	"Counter Points A Capella"
13.	"Winter Cape 1.0"
14.	"Winter Cape 2.1"
15.	"Winter Cape 3.7"
