= Bacchus and Ariadne (disambiguation) =

Bacchus and Ariadne is a 1523 painting by Titian.

Bacchus and Ariadne may also refer to:

- Bacchus and Ariadne (ballet), a 1930 ballet by Albert Roussel
- Bacchus and Ariadne (poem), an 1819 poem by Leigh Hunt
- Bacchus and Ariadne (sculpture), a 1505-1510 sculpture by Tullio Lombardo

== See also ==
- Ariane et Bacchus (French: Ariadne and Bacchus), a 1696 opera by Marin Marais
- Bacchus (disambiguation)
- Ariadne (disambiguation)
