= Edward Backus =

Edward Backus may refer to:

- Edward Wellington Backus (1861–1934), businessman in Minnesota
- Edward Burdette Backus (1888–1955), American Unitarian minister and humanist
