= Sarah Backhouse =

English daffodil breeder (1857–1921)

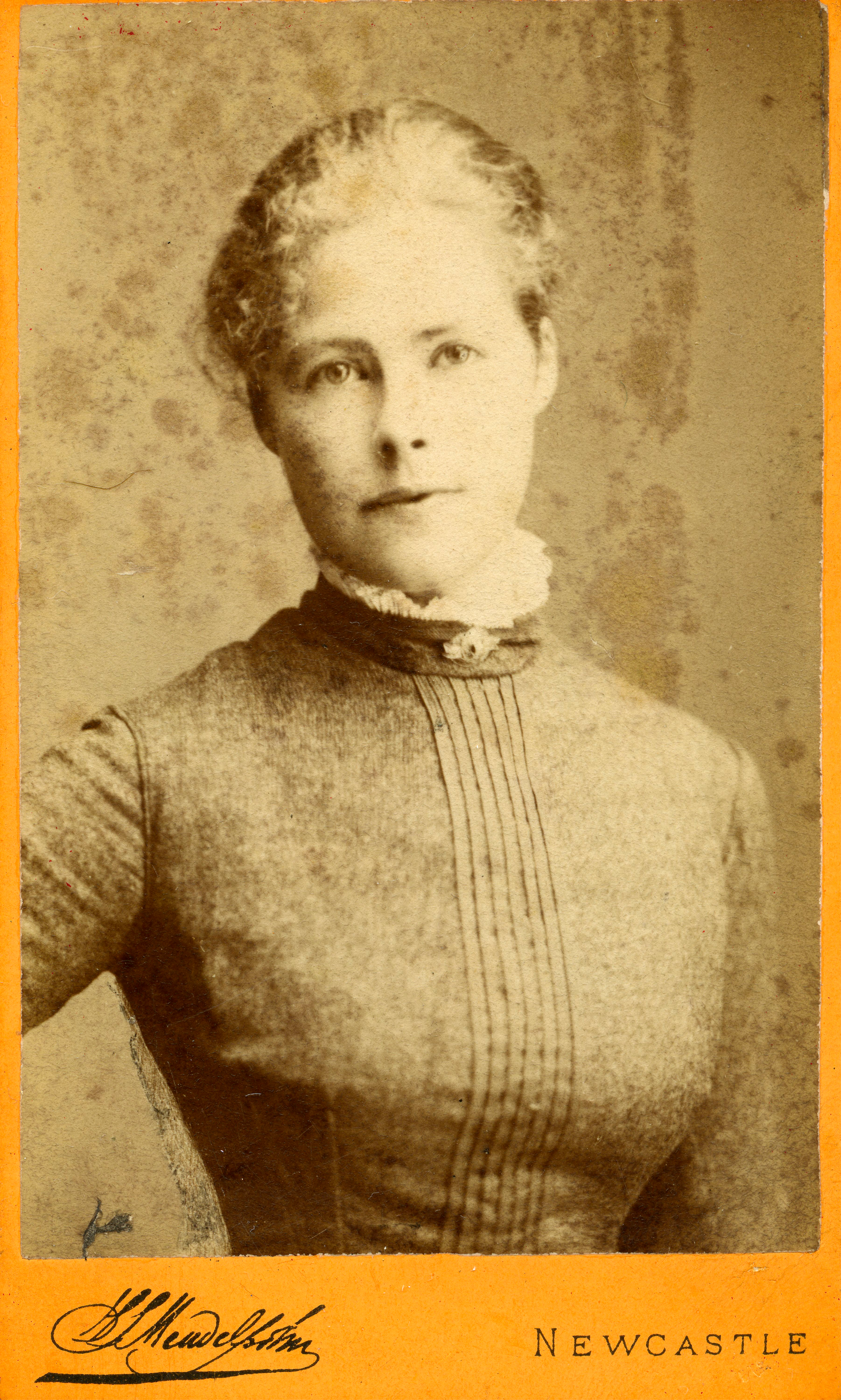
- Carte-de-visite, c. 1885
- Born: Sarah Elizabeth Dodgson; October 1857; Wigton, England
- Died: 30 January 1921 (aged 63); Hereford, England
- Occupation: Horticulturist
- Known for: Plant breeding and horticulture
- Spouse: Robert Backhouse (m. 1884; died 1921)
- Children: William Ormston Backhouse

Sarah Backhouse née Dodgson (October 1857 – 30 January 1921) was an English plant breeder and horticulturist. She was the first ever female recipient of the Royal Horticultural Society's prestigious Peter Barr Cup, and the creator of the first pink-cupped daffodil. A lilium hybrid was named "Mrs R. O. Backhouse" in her honour.

== Life and work ==
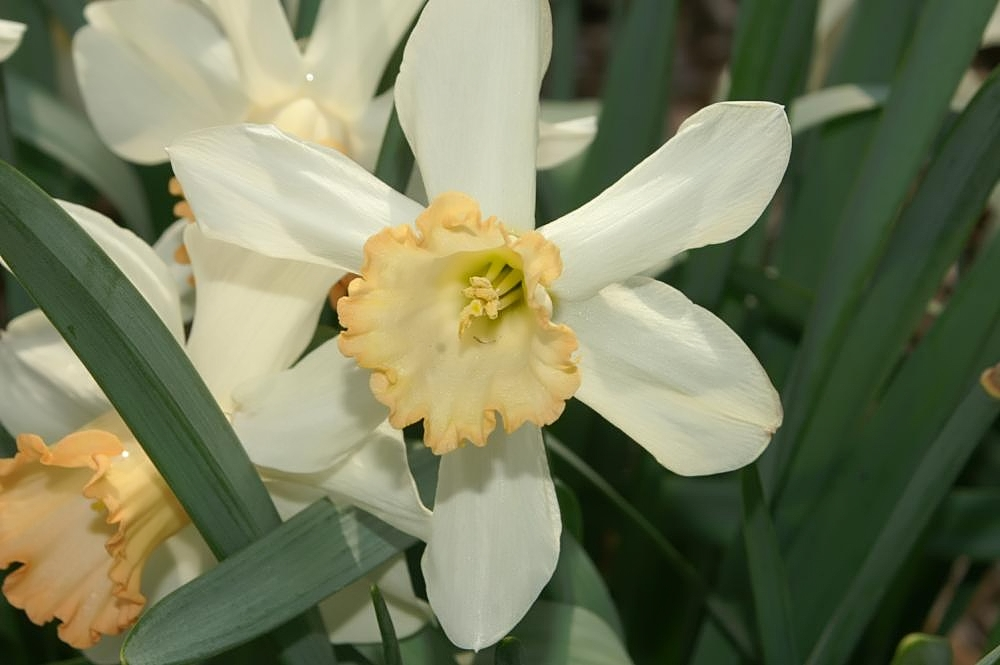
"Mrs R. O. Backhouse", the first ever pink-cupped daffodil and Sarah's namesake.

Sarah was married to Robert Ormston Backhouse (1854–1940), the third son of William Backhouse II (1807–1869), a family of amateur horticulturists and bankers who ran the Backhouse's Bank. The bank had been established in 1774 by James Backhouse (1721–1798) with his sons Jonathon and James (1757–1804). James Backhouse (1794 –1869) was among the first generation of botanical collectors in their family. William II had developed triploid daffodils and Robert began a commercial daffodil business. Sarah worked on the hybridization of a number of flowering plants including Narcissus, Colchicum, Hyacinths, Lilium, and Cyclamen. In 2025, the Royal Horticultural Society led a public search across the UK for any bulbs of the variety Mrs R. O. Backhouse flowering in private gardens.
