= Baccus =

Baccus may be either a given name or surname shared by several notable people, among them being:

- Gabriel Baccus Matthews (1948–2007), Liberian politician
- Kearyn Baccus (born 1991), Australian footballer
- Keanu Baccus (born 1998), Australian footballer
- Rick Baccus (born 1952), United States Army general
- Steven Baccus (born 1977), Seychellois Olympic weightlifter
- Whitey Baccus (1911–1968), American basketball player and coach
- Baccus (born 1990), French DJ

== See also ==
- Bacchus
- Backus (disambiguation)
