= 2013–14 Regional Super50 =

Cricket tournament

2013–14 NAGICO Super50
- Dates: 30 January – 15 February 2015
- Administrator: WICB
- Cricket format: List A (50 overs)
- Tournament format(s): Group stage, finals
- Host: Trinidad and Tobago
- Champions: Barbados (7th title)
- Participants: 8
- Matches: 15
- Most runs: (Barbados) Dwayne Smith (232)
- Most wickets: (Trinidad and Tobago) Rayad Emrit (10)

The 2013–14 NAGICO Super50 was the 40th season of the Regional Super50, the domestic limited-overs cricket competition for the countries of the West Indies Cricket Board (WICB). The competition was played as a standalone tournament (rather than using a league format), with all matches held in Trinidad and Tobago to coincide with Carnival.

Eight teams contested the competition – the six regular teams of West Indian domestic cricket (Barbados, Guyana, Jamaica, the Leeward Islands, Trinidad and Tobago, and the Windward Islands), plus a development team (Combined Campuses and Colleges) and an invited international team (Ireland). Barbados were undefeated in the group stage and were eventually joined in the final by Trinidad and Tobago. The final was played at Queen's Park Oval, Port of Spain, with Barbados winning by 17 runs to claim its seventh domestic one-day title. Barbadian batsman Dwayne Smith was the tournament's highest run-scorer (232), while Trinidad and Tobago's Rayad Emrit was the highest wicket-taker (10).

== Squads ==
Barbados	(Cricket West Indies) Combined Campuses	Guyana	Ireland
Kevin Stoute (c); Sulieman Benn; Tino Best; Rashidi Boucher; Carlos Brathwaite; Kraigg Brathwaite; Jonathan Carter; Shane Dowrich; Fidel Edwards; Kirk Edwards*; Jason Holder; Ashley Nurse; Dwayne Smith; Kenroy Williams	Steven Jacobs (c); Anthony Alleyne; Ryan Austin; Kyle Corbin; Akeem Dewar; Kavem Hodge; Kyle Mayers; Wayne Morgan; Kristopher Ramsaran; Floyd Reifer; Raymon Reifer; Shacaya Thomas; Chadwick Walton; Kesrick Williams	Christopher Barnwell (c); Robin Bacchus; Ronsford Beaton; Devendra Bishoo; Anthony Bramble; Shivnarine Chanderpaul; Royston Crandon; Narsingh Deonarine; Assad Fudadin; Trevon Griffith; Leon Johnson; Veerasammy Permaul; Ramnaresh Sarwan; Paul Wintz	William Porterfield (c); Alex Cusack; George Dockrell; Ed Joyce; Andy McBrine; Tim Murtagh; Kevin O'Brien; Niall O'Brien; Andrew Poynter; James Shannon; Max Sorensen; Paul Stirling; Stuart Thompson; Gary Wilson; Craig Young
Jamaica	Leeward Islands	Trinidad and Tobago	Windward Islands
David Bernard (c); Carlton Baugh; Jermaine Blackwood; Nkruma Bonner; John Campbell; Sheldon Cottrell; Tamar Lambert; Kennar Lewis; Andre McCarthy; Horace Miller; Nikita Miller; Andrew Richardson; Andre Russell; Jerome Taylor	Kieran Powell (c); Justin Athanaze; Lionel Baker; Quinton Boatswain; Rahkeem Cornwall; Jahmar Hamilton; Montcin Hodge; Sylvester Joseph; Anthony Martin; Mali Richards; Devon Thomas; Gavin Tonge; Hayden Walsh, Jr.; Kelbert Walters	Dwayne Bravo (c); Adrian Barath; Darren Bravo; Kevon Cooper; Rayad Emrit; Shannon Gabriel; Imran Khan; Evin Lewis; Jason Mohammed; Sunil Narine; Yannick Ottley; Denesh Ramdin; Ravi Rampaul; Lendl Simmons	Liam Sebastien (c); Alston Bobb; Johnson Charles; Romel Currency; Craig Emmanuel; Andre Fletcher; Delorn Johnson; Keddy Lesporis; Garey Mathurin; Mervin Matthew; Kenroy Peters; Dalton Polius; Devon Smith; Tyrone Theophile

- Note: Kirk Edwards was originally named in Barbados' squad for the tournament, but was withdrawn for disciplinary reasons. He was not replaced.

== Group stage ==
=== Zone A ===
Team	Pld	W	L	T	A	BP	Pts	NRR
Jamaica	3	3	0	0	0	1	13	+0.943
Guyana	3	2	1	0	0	1	9	+0.840
Ireland	3	1	2	0	0	1	5	–0.998
Windward Islands	3	0	3	0	0	0	0	–0.667

30 January 2014
Scorecard

Jamaica; 282/5 (50 overs)	v	Windward Islands; 268/8 (50 overs)

Jamaica won by 14 runs
Queen's Park Oval, Port of Spain
Player of the match: Tamar Lambert (Jam)

31 January 2014
Scorecard

Guyana; 301/3 (50 overs)	v	Ireland; 187 (38.3 overs)

Guyana won by 114 runs
Queen's Park Oval, Port of Spain
Player of the match: Ramnaresh Sarwan (Guy)

3 February 2014
Scorecard

Ireland; 161 (46.1 overs)	v	Jamaica; 166/4 (29 overs)

Jamaica won by 6 wickets
Queen's Park Oval, Port of Spain
Player of the match: Andre Russell (Jam)

4 February 2014
Scorecard

Guyana; 235/7 (50 overs)	v	Windward Islands; 213 (46.4 overs)

Guyana won by 22 runs
Queen's Park Oval, Port of Spain
Player of the match: Ronsford Beaton (Guy)

7 February 2014
Scorecard

Ireland; 179 (48.3 overs)	v	Windward Islands; 115 (35 overs)

Ireland won by 64 runs
Queen's Park Oval, Port of Spain
Player of the match: George Dockrell (Ire)

8 February 2014
Scorecard

Jamaica; 243/7 (50 overs)	v	Guyana; 233 (49.5 overs)

Jamaica won by 10 runs
Queen's Park Oval, Port of Spain
Player of the match: Nkruma Bonner (Jam)

=== Zone B ===
Team	Pld	W	L	T	A	BP	Pts	NRR
Barbados	3	2	0	0	1	1	11	+1.051
Trinidad and Tobago	3	2	1	0	0	2	10	+1.984
(Cricket West Indies) Combined Campuses	3	1	1	0	1	1	7	+0.666
Leeward Islands	3	0	3	0	0	0	0	–2.204

1 February 2014
Scorecard

Combined Campuses (Cricket West Indies); 240 (49.5 overs)	v	Leeward Islands; 80 (24.5 overs)

Combined Campuses won by 160 runs
Queen's Park Oval, Port of Spain
Player of the match: Kyle Mayers (CCC)

2 February 2014
Scorecard

Barbados; 269/8 (45 overs)	v	Trinidad and Tobago; 241 (43.3 overs)

Trinidad and Tobago won by 28 runs
Queen's Park Oval, Port of Spain
Player of the match: Jonathan Carter (Bar)

- The match was reduced to 45 overs per side before the start of play.

5 February 2014
Scorecard

Leeward Islands; 140 (43.2 overs)	v	Trinidad and Tobago; 144/5 (27.1 overs)

Trinidad and Tobago won by 5 wickets
Shaw Park, Scarborough
Player of the match: Sunil Narine (Tri)

6 February 2014
Scorecard

Barbados	v	(Cricket West Indies) Combined Campuses

Match abandoned
Shaw Park, Scarborough

9 February 2014
Scorecard

Combined Campuses (Cricket West Indies); 98 (44.2 overs)	v	Trinidad and Tobago; 100/3 (16.2 overs)

Trinidad and Tobago won by 7 wickets
Queen's Park Oval, Port of Spain
Player of the match: Jason Mohammed (Tri)

10 February 2014
Scorecard

Leeward Islands; 103 (39.5 overs)	v	Barbados; 104/6 (34.5 overs)

Barbados won by 4 wickets
Queen's Park Oval, Port of Spain
Player of the match: Ashley Nurse (Bar)

== Finals ==
=== Semi-finals ===
12 February 2014
Scorecard

Jamaica; 49 (24.2 overs)	v	Trinidad and Tobago; 51/3 (13.1 overs)

Trinidad and Tobago won by 7 wickets
Queen's Park Oval, Port of Spain
Player of the match: Dwayne Bravo (Tri)

- Jamaica's total of 49 was its lowest in the history of the competition.

13 February 2014
Scorecard

Guyana; 181 (48.4 overs)	v	Barbados; 182/3 (46 overs)

Barbados won by 7 wickets
Queen's Park Oval, Port of Spain
Player of the match: Dwayne Smith (Bar)

=== Final ===
15 February 2014
Scorecard

Barbados; 252 (48.4 overs)	v	Trinidad and Tobago; 235 (45.5 overs)

Barbados won by 17 runs
Queen's Park Oval, Port of Spain
Player of the match: Dwayne Smith (Bar)

== Statistics ==
=== Most runs ===
The top five run scorers (total runs) are included in this table.

Player	Team	Runs	Inns	Avg	S/R	Highest	100s	50s
Dwayne Smith	Barbados	232	4	58.00	119.58	83	0	3
Jonathan Carter	Barbados	170	4	42.50	80.95	109	1	0
Ramnaresh Sarwan	Guyana	151	3	75.50	91.51	89*	0	2
Nkruma Bonner	Jamaica	146	4	48.66	75.25	122*	1	0
Shivnarine Chanderpaul	Guyana	144	2	72.00	67.28	79	0	2

Source: CricketArchive

=== Most wickets ===
The top five wicket takers are listed in this table, listed by wickets taken and then by bowling average.

Player	Team	Overs	Wkts	Ave	SR	Econ	BBI
Rayad Emrit	Trinidad and Tobago	34.4	10	15.10	20.80	4.35	4/19
Sulieman Benn	Barbados	36.5	9	13.55	24.55	3.31	4/39
Ravi Rampaul	Trinidad and Tobago	36.0	9	14.88	24.00	3.72	4/20
Sunil Narine	Trinidad and Tobago	36.2	8	8.00	27.25	1.76	4/19
Veerasammy Permaul	Guyana	39.4	8	18.00	29.75	3.63	3/24

Source: CricketArchive

== See also ==
- Irish cricket team in the West Indies in 2013–14
