= Backhouse (ship) =

Several ships have been named Backhouse:

- Backhouse (1785 ship) was launched at Chester. She initially sailed as a West Indiaman. In 1792–1793 she made one voyage as a slave ship. Once in 1796 and again in 1797 she repelled attacks by French privateers in single-ship actions. Backhouse made four more slave trading voyages and then returned to the West Indies trade. After about 1809 she became a London coaster and was last listed in 1813.
- Backhouse (1798 ship) was launched at Dartmouth. In all, she made four voyages as a slave ship. Between the second and the third, and after the fourth, she was a West Indiaman. A French privateer captured her early in 1810 as she was returning to Britain from Brazil.
- Backhouse (1799 ship) was launched at Hull as a West Indiaman. Mather & Co. purchased her in 1800 and then employed her on two whaling voyages to the Southern Whale Fishery. They sold her in 1805 and her new owner sailed her to the West Indies. In September 1806, as she was homeward-bound, her crew burned her as she was too leaky to continue.
