= Tullio Lombardo =

Italian sculptor (died 1532)

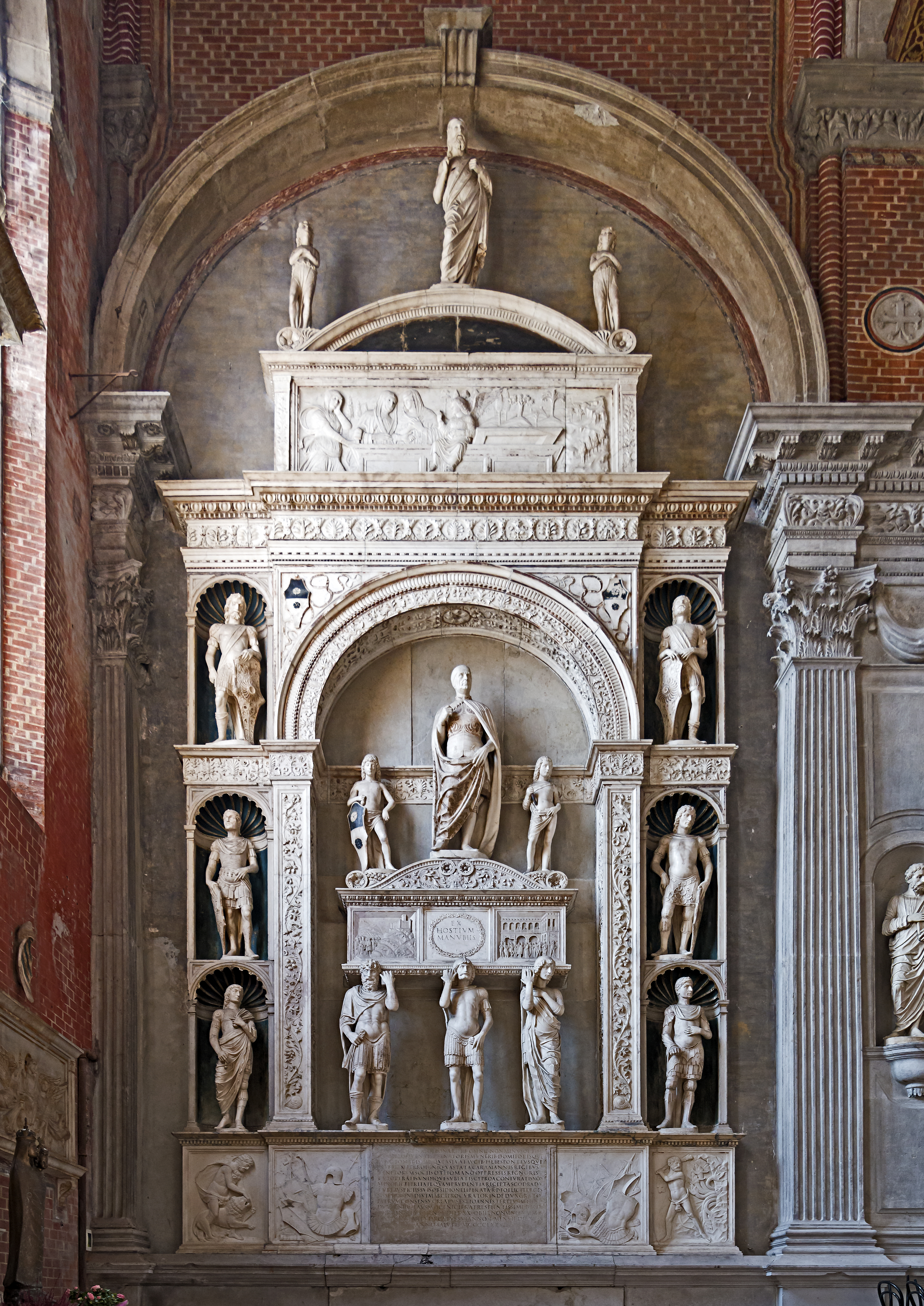
Monument to Doge Mocenigo

Tullio Lombardo (c. 1455 – November 17, 1532), also known as Tullio Solari, was an Italian Renaissance sculptor. He was the brother of Antonio Lombardo and son of Pietro Lombardo. The Lombardo family worked together to sculpt famous Catholic churches and tombs. The church of Santi Giovanni e Paolo contains the Monument to Doge Pietro Mocenigo, executed with his father and brother, and the Monument to Doge Andrea Vendramin, an evocation of a Roman triumphal arch encrusted with decorative figures. His sculpture of Adam formed part of the monument, and is considered the first monumental classical nude since antiquity.

Tullio also likely completed the funereal monument to Marco Cornaro in the Church of Santi Apostoli in Venice and the frieze in the Cornaro Chapel of the Santa Maria Gloriosa dei Frari. He also participated in the work to decorate Santa Maria dei Miracoli, Venice. The funeral monument to Doge Giovanni Mocenigo (r. 1478–1485), in San Giovanni e Paolo, is also attributed to Tullio Lombardo.

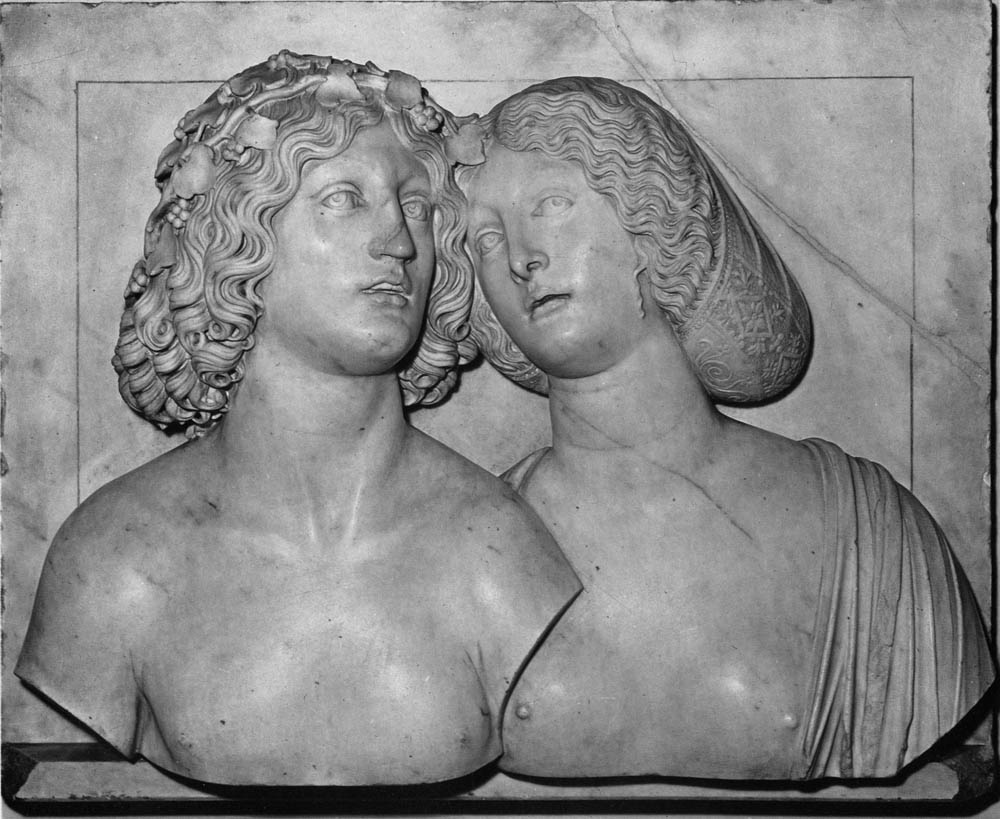
Young Couple

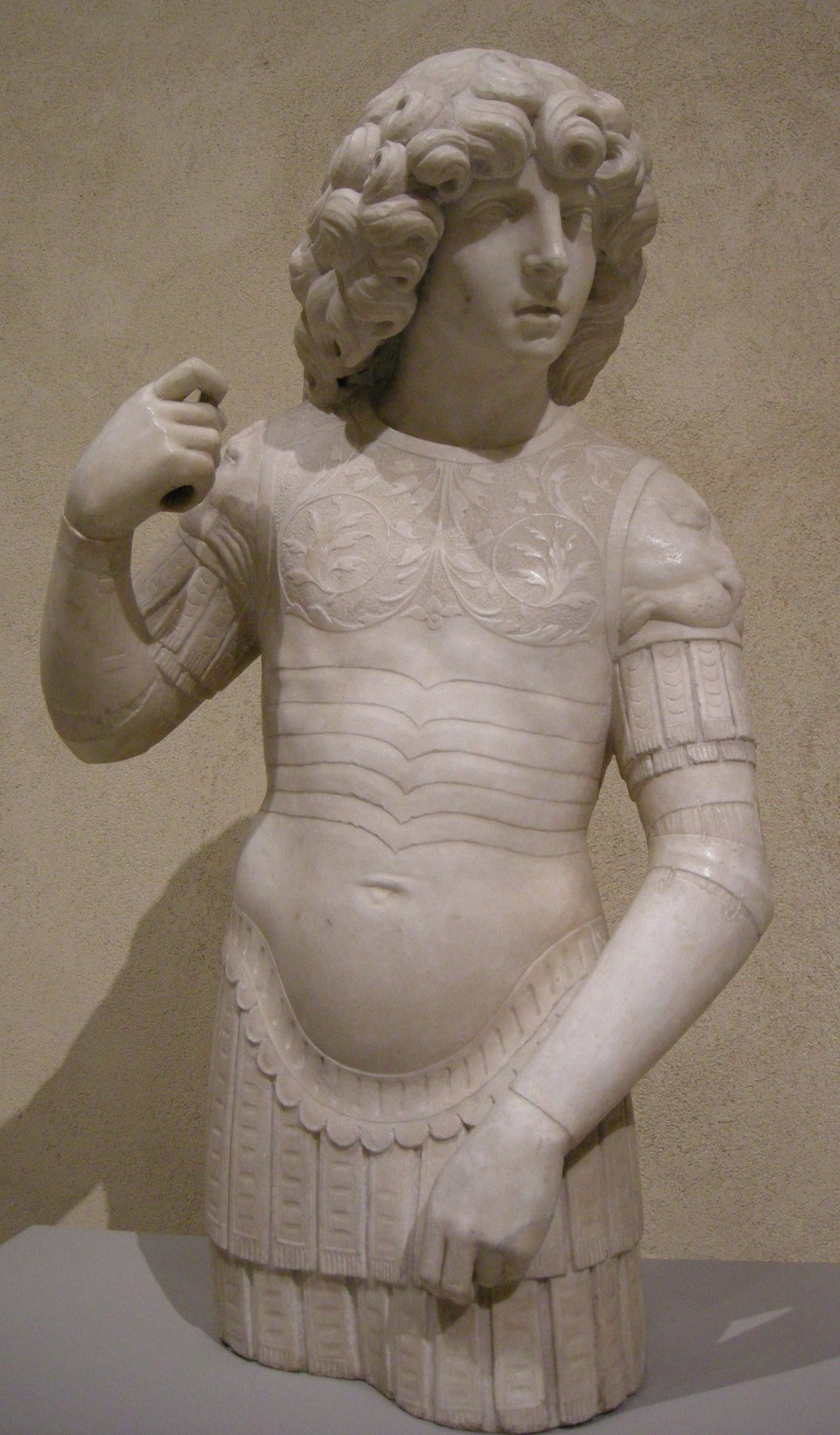
Young Warrior

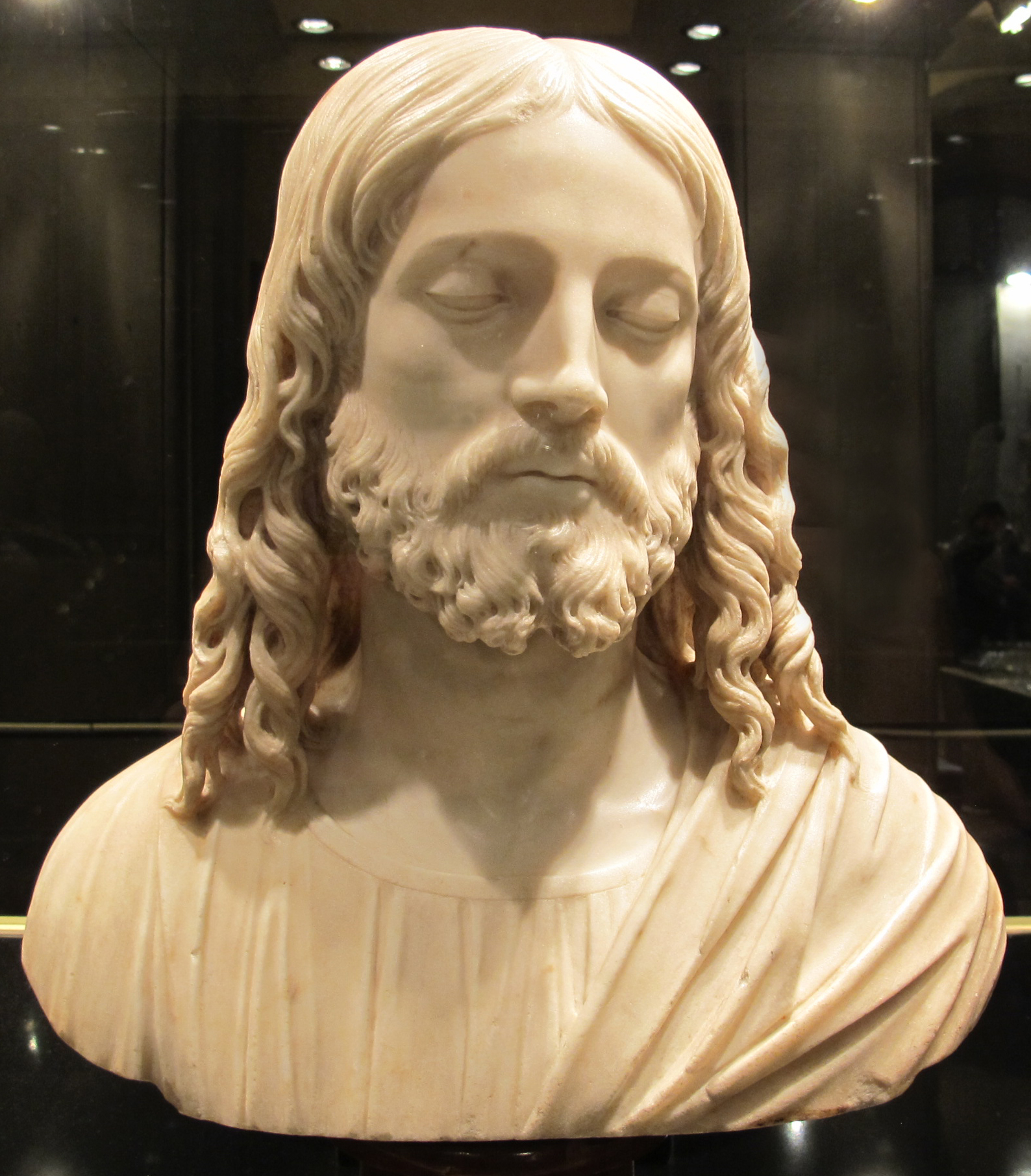
Bust of Christ

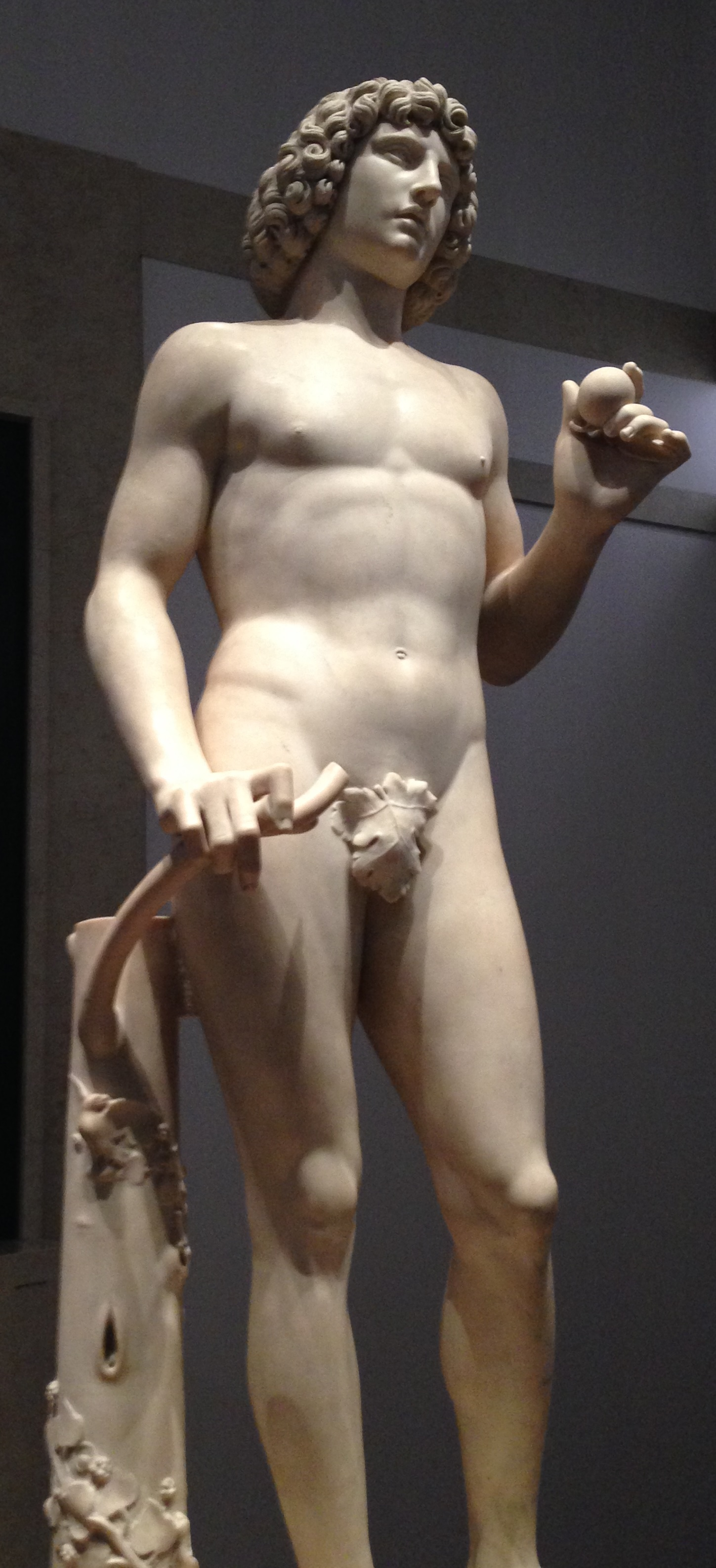
Adam
