= Adam (Lombardo) =

Marble statue by Tullio Lombardo

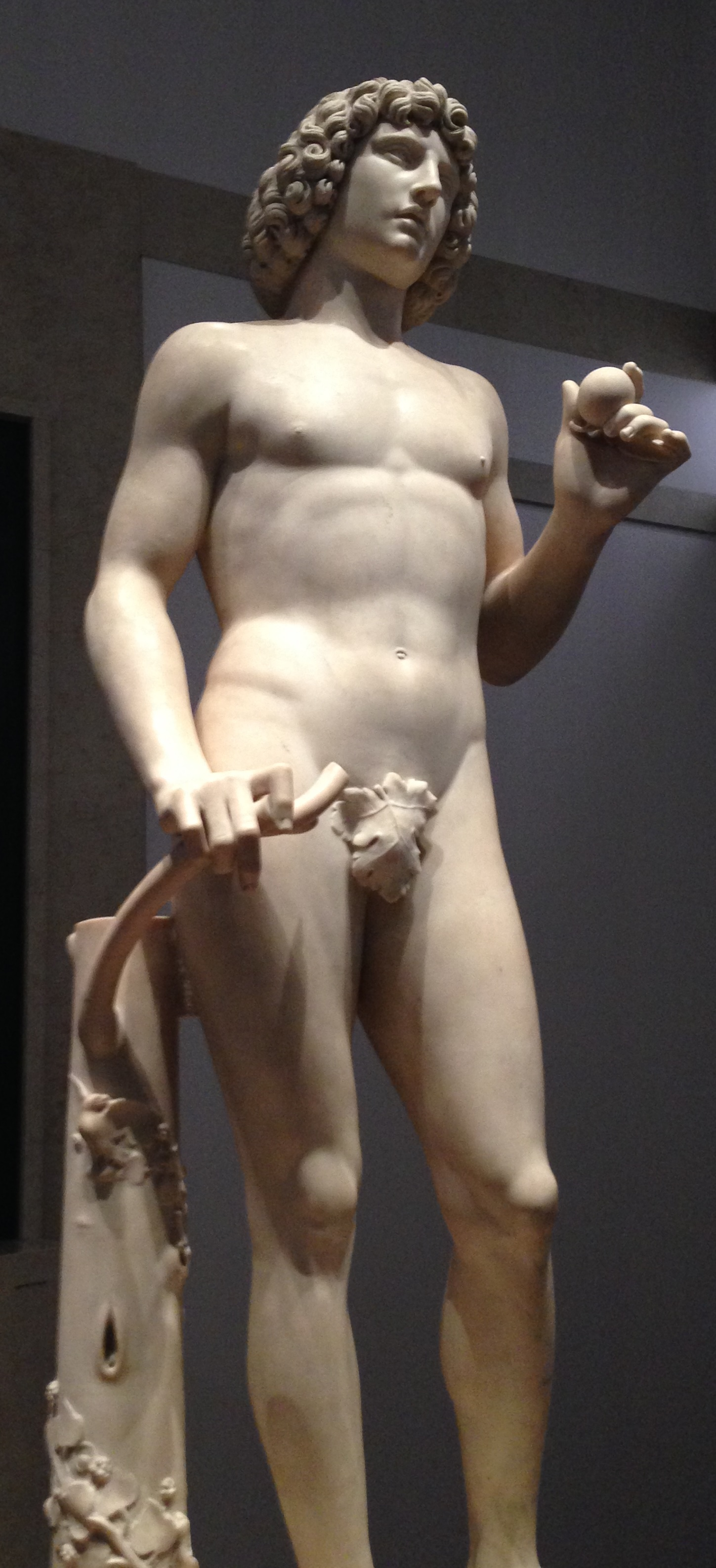
Sculpture of Adam after restoration process on exhibit at the Metropolitan Museum of Art

Adam is an Italian Renaissance sculpture of c.1490–1495, a marble statue by Tullio Lombardo, now in the Metropolitan Museum of Art in New York, which bought it in 1936. It is of prime importance as the first lifesize nude marble sculpture since antiquity, though Donatello's famous bronze David had preceded it by several decades.

== Use as funerary art ==
The sculpture was made as one of several subsidiary figures, including a lost companion statue of Eve, for the tomb of Doge Andrea Vendramin (d. 1478), which was later reconfigured.

== Ownership ==
Previously it had passed through the Vendramin-Calergi family, remaining in the Palazzo Vendramin-Calergi in Venice when the Duchess of Berry bought the palazzo in 1844. She then sold it to Henri Dieudonné d'Artois, comte de Chambord in 1865. It was then recorded as owned by Princess Beatrix de Bourbon-Massimo before being acquired by Henry Pereire sometime after 1921, then passed to his widow and through various auction houses before being acquired by its present owner.

== Breaking of the statue and restoration ==
On the evening of October 6, 2002, the statue fell to the floor of the Vélez Blanco patio and broke into 28 larger pieces and hundreds of small fragments. An investigation theorized the fall was because the wooden pedestal the sculpture was displayed on proved inadequate for the weight of the marble, and gave way. After more than a decade of restoration, Adam was put back on display at the museum in 2014. Museum officials assert that their process for restoring the sculpture helped create a new model for the conservation of large sculptures.
