= Robert Backhouse =

British archer and horticulturalist (1854–1940)

Robert Ormston Backhouse (10 March 1854 – 10 April 1940) was a British archer who competed at the 1908 Summer Olympics in London. He and his wife, Sarah Dodgson, were also known for producing new varieties of daffodils and lilies. He was born in Darlington, County Durham and died in Sutton St Nicholas, Herefordshire.

Backhouse entered the double York round event in 1908, taking 13th place with 516 points. He also shot a round in the manner of the Continental style event but as a demonstration rather than in the actual competition. He scored 260 points, which would have given him a silver medal if his competition had been official. Backhouse received a Diploma of Merit for his effort in the Continental style.

== Horticulture ==
At their home, Sutton Court in Herefordshire, he and his wife, Sarah, continued the botanical interests of his grandfather, William Backhouse (1779–1844), and father, William Backhouse (1807–1869), and spent much time in cultivating daffodils and lilies. His brothers, Charles and Henry, also raised daffodils, as did his son William Ormston Backhouse (1885–1962). The popular daffodil variety, Mrs. R. O. Backhouse, the first daffodil with a pink cup and white perianth, was among the ones they developed. It was registered in 1923 and was named for Sarah Backhouse by her husband, after her death in 1921.

== Legacy ==
In 2025, the Royal Horticultural Society led a public search across the UK for any bulbs of the variety Mrs R. O. Backhouse flowering in private gardens.
