= Backus =

Backus is an English surname, a variant of Backhouse. The surname derives from Middle English bak(e)hous, meaning bakehouse.

== People ==
Notable people with the surname include:

- A. E. Backus (1909–1990), American artist
- Azel Backus (1765–1816), first President of Hamilton College in New York
- Billy Backus (born 1943), former world boxing champion
- Catherine Backus (1863–1955), American sculptor
- Edward Burdette Backus (1888–1955), American Unitarian minister and humanist
- Edward Wellington Backus (1861–1934), American timber baron
- Frederick F. Backus (1794–1858), American physician and member of the New York State Senate
- George Edward Backus (born 1930), American geophysicist
- Gus Backus (1937–2019), American singer
- Henny Backus (1911–2004), Broadway showgirl and wife of Jim Backus
- Henry T. Backus (1809–1877), American politician, Lieutenant Governor of Michigan and judge in Arizona Territory
- Isaac Backus (1724–1806), American Baptist preacher and politician
- Jan Backus (20th century), American politician
- Jeff Backus (born 1977), American professional football player
- Jim Backus (1913–1989), American actor
- John Backus (1924–2007), American computer scientist
- Samuel W. Backus, 19th-century American politician from California
- Sharron Backus (born 1946), American former softball player and coach
- Shea Backus (born 1975), American politician
- Standish Backus (1910–1989), American military artist
- Winston Backus (1920–2020), Canadian politician

== See also ==
- Backusella, a genus of fungi named after the surname Backus, in honour of Professor M. P. Backus
