= Bachus =

Bachus may refer to:

== People ==
- Jennifer Bachus, an American diplomat
- Spencer Bachus (born 1947), an American politician

== Other uses ==
- Bachus, Lublin Voivodeship, a village in eastern Poland
- Bacchus (1786 ship), a vessel that made five voyages transporting enslaved people
- Papilio bachus, a species of butterfly

== See also ==
- Bacchus (disambiguation)
- Backus (disambiguation)
