= Leviathan (Therion album) =

17th studio album by Therion

Studio album by Therion
- Released: 22 January 2021
- Genre: Symphonic metal
- Length: 45:32
- Label: Nuclear Blast

Therion chronology
Beloved Antichrist (2018)	Leviathan (2021)	Leviathan II (2022)

Leviathan is the seventeenth studio album by Swedish symphonic metal band Therion. It was released on 22 January 2021 by Nuclear Blast Records. It is the first part in the Leviathan trilogy, whose sequel albums, Leviathan II and Leviathan III, were released on 2022 and 2023 respectively.

Two music videos were released for the album: "Die Wellen der Zeit" and "Tuonela"; also, a lyric video was released for the song "Leviathan". A few months after the release of the album, one additional music video was released for "Eye of Algol".

Vocalist Thomas Vikström confirmed that the band indeed aimed to make a more "normal" album again. Christofer Johnsson has described the Leviathan trilogy as "hit albums" deliberately drawing influence from the most popular and beloved elements of their back catalog, with Leviathan being bombastic and catchy.

== Lyrical themes ==
As with most Therion albums, all songs are based on various mythologies. All lyrics are written by Per Albinsson except "Psalm of Retribution", which was written by Christofer Johnsson.

- The Leaf on the Oak of Far is about Camulus, a Gaulish god of war.
- Tuonela is the underworld of dead in Finnish mythology.
- Leviathan is the enormous sea serpent from the Old Testament; it is also featured in the cover art.
- Die Wellen der Zeit ("The Waves of Time" in German) is about Nerthus, the Germanic goddess of peace and prosperity.
- Aži Dahāka is a monstrous snake-man in Iranian mythology.
- Eye of Algol is about a star in the Perseus constellation; in Greek mythology, it is associated with the head of Medusa the Gorgon.
- Nocturnal Light is about Inanna (known better by some as Ishtar), Sumerian goddess of love, similar to Venus.
- Great Marquis of Hell is about the demon Aamon, a Marquis of Hell in Ars Goetia.
- Psalm of Retribution is based on Kaballah and references the qlippoth, in particular A'arab Zaraq.
- El Primer Sol ("The First Sun" in Spanish) is about the creator god Tezcatlipoca, as well as the Five Suns Myth in Aztec mythology.
- Ten Courts of Diyu is about the afterworld judgement in Chinese mythology.

== Reception ==
Professional ratings
Review scores
Source	Rating
AllMusic	4/5 stars
Blabbermouth.net	7.5/10 stars

Critical reception of Leviathan was mostly positive; many critics compared the album to Therion's albums of the 2000s and considered it the band's "return" after two softer and more complex concept albums.

== Track listing ==
Leviathan - Standard edition
No.	Title	Music	Length
1.	"The Leaf on the Oak of Far"	Christofer Johnsson, Thomas Vikström	3:38
2.	"Tuonela"	Christofer Johnsson	4:37
3.	"Leviathan"	Christofer Johnsson	4:01
4.	"Die Wellen der Zeit"	Nalle Påhlsson	3:46
5.	"Aži Dahāka"	Christofer Johnsson	3:06
6.	"Eye of Algol"	Christofer Johnsson, Thomas Vikström	4:03
7.	"Nocturnal Light"	Thomas Vikström	5:37
8.	"Great Marquis of Hell"	Christofer Johnsson, Thomas Vikström	2:36
9.	"Psalm of Retribution"	Christofer Johnsson, Thomas Vikström	5:02
10.	"El Primer Sol"	Christofer Johnsson, Thomas Vikström	3:37
11.	"Ten Courts of Diyu"	Thomas Vikström	5:29
Total length:			45:32

Leviathan - Digipak Special Edition
No.	Title	Music	Length
12.	"Eye of Algol (Alternative Vocals Version)"	Christofer Johnsson, Thomas Vikström	4:05
13.	"Tuonela (Full Marco Vocals Version)"	Christofer Johnsson	4:41
14.	"Tuonela (Alternative Vocals Version)"	Christofer Johnsson	4:41
15.	"Tuonela (Instrumental Version)"	Christofer Johnsson	4:40
16.	"Tuonela (Orchestral Version)"	Christofer Johnsson	4:33
Total length:			68:12

== Personnel ==
- Christofer Johnsson – rhythm guitar, keyboards, programming
- Christian Vidal – lead guitar
- Nalle Påhlsson – bass
- Thomas Vikström – lead and backing vocals
- Lori Lewis – soprano (3, 5, 7, 8 and 9)

=== Guest vocalists ===
- Rosalia Sairem – lead vocals (1, 6 and 10), mezzo-soprano (6)
- Chiara Malvestiti – soprano (3, 5 and 7)
- Taida Nazraić – lead vocals (2, 4 and 11)
- Noa Gruman – lead vocals (11)
- Marko Hietala – lead vocals (2)
- Mats Levén – lead vocals (9)
- Hellscore – choir

=== Guest instrumentalists ===
- Jonas Öijvall – Hammond organ (5 and 6)
- Snowy Shaw – drums (4, 5, 7, 10 and 11)
- Björn Höglund – drums (1, 2, 3, 6, 8 and 9)
- Ally Storch – solo violin (2)
- Fabio Amurri – keyboards, programming

== Charts ==
Chart performance for Leviathan
Chart (2021)	Peak position
Austrian Albums (Ö3 Austria)	45
Belgian Albums (Ultratop Flanders)	173
French Albums (SNEP)	162
German Albums (Offizielle Top 100)	11
Hungarian Albums (MAHASZ)	15
Polish Albums (ZPAV)	25
Swiss Albums (Schweizer Hitparade)	12
