= Irish cricket team in the West Indies in 2013–14 =

Mens cricket tour

| | West Indies | Ireland |
- Dates: 31 January – 23 February 2014
| Captains | Dwayne Bravo (ODI); Darren Sammy (T20Is) | William Porterfield |

One Day International series
- Results: West Indies won the 1-match series 1–0

Twenty20 International series
- Results: 2-match series drawn 1–1
- Player of the series: Alex Cusack (Ire)

The Irish cricket team toured the West Indies in January and February 2014 to play two Twenty20 Internationals (T20Is) and a One Day International (ODI) match. Along with the international matches, Ireland also competed in the 2013–14 Regional Super50 tournament, the domestic one-day cricket competition in the West Indies. The T20I series was drawn 1–1 and the West Indies won the only ODI.

== T20I series ==
=== 1st T20I ===
19 February 2014
Scorecard

| West Indies; 116/8 (20 overs) | v | Ireland; 117/4 (19.1 overs) |
| Chris Gayle 18 (19); Alex Cusack 2/17 (4 overs) | | Ed Joyce 40* (49); Samuel Badree 2/18 (4 overs) |

Ireland won by 6 wickets
Sabina Park, Kingston, Jamaica
Umpires: Gregory Brathwaite (WI) and Joel Wilson (WI)
Player of the match: Ed Joyce (Ire)

- West Indies won the toss and elected to bat.
- Stuart Thompson (Ire) made his T20I debut.

=== 2nd T20I ===
21 February 2014
Scorecard

| West Indies; 96/9 (20 overs) | v | Ireland; 85/8 (20 overs) |
| Andre Fletcher 19 (15); Alex Cusack 4/11 (4 overs) | | Gary Wilson 35 (39); Darren Sammy 3/22 (4 overs) |

West Indies won by 11 runs
Sabina Park, Kingston, Jamaica
Umpires: Nigel Duguid (WI) and Joel Wilson (WI)
Player of the match: Darren Sammy (WI)

- Ireland won the toss and elected to field.

== ODI series ==
=== Only ODI ===
23 February 2014
Scorecard

| Ireland; 202 (49.2 overs) | v | West Indies; 205/6 (36.4 overs) |
| Gary Wilson 62 (96); Jason Holder 3/34 (9 overs) | | Kieran Powell 57 (80); Stuart Thompson 2/17 (4 overs) |

West Indies won by 4 wickets
Sabina Park, Kingston, Jamaica
Umpires: Gregory Brathwaite (WI) and Michael Gough (Eng)
Player of the match: Dwayne Bravo (WI)

- Ireland won the toss and elected to bat.
- Miguel Cummins (WI) made his ODI debut.
