= Leviathan II =

18th studio album by Therion

Studio album by Therion
- Released: 28 October 2022
- Genre: Symphonic metal
- Length: 46:22
- Label: Nuclear Blast

Therion chronology
Leviathan (2021)	Leviathan II (2022)	Leviathan III (2023)

Leviathan II is the eighteenth studio album by Swedish symphonic metal band Therion. It was released on 28 October 2022 by Nuclear Blast Records. It is the second part in the Leviathan trilogy, whose first and last albums, Leviathan and Leviathan III, were released on 2021 and 2023 respectively.

According to Christofer Johnsson, this second part of the trilogy attempts aimed towards a "more moody and melancholic" sound, that rekindles the "mystic, melancholic aura" of their groundbreaking work Vovin.

== Lyrical themes ==
As with most Therion albums, all songs are based on various mythologies, as well as other mystical traditions and lore.

- Aeon Of Maat is about the next spiritual era of mankind, prophesized by Aleister Crowley.
- Litany Of The Fallen talks about the rebellion and defeat of Lucifer and the fallen angels that accompanied him.
- Alchemy Of The Soul is about the works of alchemy and the philosopher's stone.
- Lunar Coloured Fields talks about Life on the Moon.
- Lucifuge Rofocale is about Lucifuge, the demon lord of Saturn from the Grand Grimoire.
- Marijin Min Nar is about the legendary djinn from Arabian tradition.
- Hades And Elysium is about those locations of the afterlife from Greek mythology.
- Midnight Star is about Zorya, the goddess of dawn from Slavic folklore.
- Cavern Cold As Ice is about the cave where queen of sorcessess Agrat bat Mahlat dwells.
- Codex Gigas is about the book of the same name and its legend, that states it was inspired by the demons.
- Pazuzu is about the Persian demon of the same name, that protects from foul winds.
- The album cover art features a fallen angel next to the seven-headed Dragon from the biblical book of Revelation (also previously depicted in the cover arts of Lepaca Kliffoth and Symphony Masses: Ho Drakon Ho Megas).

== Reception ==
Professional ratings
Review scores
Source	Rating
AllMusic	3.5/5 stars
Metal Storm	7.5/10

Leviathan II was well-received; AllMusic considered that, because of its diversity, it wouldn't appeal to every listener, but it still "does offer plenty for those who enjoy the more classical and prog metal characteristics in the band's sound".

== Track listing ==
No.	Title	Length
1.	"Aeon of Maat"	2:37
2.	"Litany of the Fallen"	4:11
3.	"Alchemy of the Soul"	4:11
4.	"Lunar Coloured Fields"	5:40
5.	"Lucifuge Rofocale"	4:43
6.	"Marijin Min Nar"	5:46
7.	"Hades and Elysium"	4:23
8.	"Midnight Star"	4:43
9.	"Cavern Cold as Ice"	3:26
10.	"Codex Gigas"	4:07
11.	"Pazuzu"	4:28
12.	"Aeon of Maat (Alternative Vocals Version)"	2:38
13.	"Pazuzu (AOR Version)"	4:26
Total length:		46:22
