= Beloved Antichrist =

Studio album by Therion
- Released: 9 February 2018
- Genre: Symphonic metal
- Length: 182:50
- Label: Nuclear Blast

Therion chronology
Les Fleurs du Mal (2012)	Beloved Antichrist (2018)	Leviathan (2021)

Beloved Antichrist is the sixteenth studio album by Swedish symphonic metal band Therion. It is a triple album and was released on 9 February 2018 by Nuclear Blast Records. The album is the soundtrack to a rock musical by the band, who are accompanied by a large orchestra and choir. The staging of the rock musical was delayed indefinitely due to the Covid-19 pandemic. Instead, the band started to work on the next regular album Leviathan.

Beloved Antichrist was the band's first release of new original material since Sitra Ahra in 2010. Group founder Christofer Johnsson had toyed with the idea of writing an opera for 15 years and had finally decided to "do metal/rock music with opera" instead, citing his inability to write "the ‘boring’ stuff" like recitatives. Thus, Beloved Antichrist features exclusively operatic singing combined with an orchestra and electric instruments typical of a rock band.

The music was composed by Johnsson, Thomas Vikström, Linnéa Vikström and Christian Vidal, the lyrics were written by Per Albinsson and the album cover was created by Thomas Ewerhart. The album consists of 46 songs and is inspired by and partly based on "A Short Tale of the Antichrist" by Vladímir Soloviov. Johnsson expanded the story to include 27 characters played by 15 vocalists.

== Reception ==
Professional ratings
Review scores
Source	Rating
AllMusic	4.5/5 stars
Inferno	2.5/5 stars
Laut.de	4/5 stars
Magazyn Gitarzysta	5/10
Metal Hammer	7/7
Plattentests.de	7/10
Powermetal.de	10/10
Rock Hard	7/10
Soundi	4/5 stars

Beloved Antichrist has received generally favorable reviews. Thom Jurek, writing for AllMusic, praised the album for its imaginativity and good execution, and said it is best experienced as a whole in a single listening.

== Track listing ==
Act 1
No.	Title	Length
1.	"Turn from Heaven"	3:06
2.	"Where Will You Go?"	2:15
3.	"Through Dust, Through Rain"	5:01
4.	"Signs Are Here"	4:21
5.	"Never Again"	2:20
6.	"Bring Her Home"	3:59
7.	"The Solid Black Beyond"	3:47
8.	"The Crowning of Splendour"	3:34
9.	"Morning Has Broken"	6:39
10.	"Garden of Peace"	3:25
11.	"Our Destiny"	2:41
12.	"Anthem"	4:18
13.	"The Palace Ball"	5:20
14.	"Jewels from Afar"	4:22
15.	"Hail Caesar!"	5:10
16.	"What Is Wrong?"	2:07
17.	"Nothing but My Name"	2:02
Total length:		65:36

Act 2
No.	Title	Length
18.	"The Arrival of Apollonius"	5:06
19.	"Pledging Loyalty"	2:56
20.	"Night Reborn"	3:57
21.	"Dagger of God"	3:32
22.	"Temple of New Jerusalem"	4:01
23.	"The Lions Roar"	3:43
24.	"Bringing the Gospel"	4:44
25.	"Laudate Dominum"	5:00
26.	"Remaining Silent"	2:56
27.	"Behold Antichrist"	4:40
28.	"Cursed by the Fallen"	2:00
29.	"Resurrection"	3:41
30.	"To Where I Weep"	5:57
31.	"Astral Sophia"	5:42
32.	"Thy Will Be Done!"	4:37
Total length:		62:41

Act 3
No.	Title	Length
33.	"Shoot Them Down!"	3:49
34.	"Beneath the Starry Skies"	4:26
35.	"Forgive Me"	9:41
36.	"The Wasteland of My Heart"	3:24
37.	"Burning the Palace"	8:22
38.	"Prelude to War"	0:38
39.	"Day of Wrath"	4:13
40.	"Rise to War"	3:47
41.	"Time Has Come/Final Battle"	2:56
42.	"My Voyage Carries On"	3:52
43.	"Striking Darkness"	2:04
44.	"Seeds of Time"	1:38
45.	"To Shine Forever"	2:06
46.	"Theme of Antichrist"	3:31
Total length:		Act 3: 54:34; Total: 182:50

== Personnel ==
- Christofer Johnsson - guitars, keyboards, programming, Hammond organ, orchestral arrangement
- Sami Karppinen - drums
- Thomas Vikström - lead vocals
- Nalle "Grizzly" Påhlsson - bass
- Christian Vidal - guitar
- Lori Lewis - vocals
- Chiara Malvestiti - vocals

== Charts ==
Chart (2018)	Peak position
Austrian Albums (Ö3 Austria)	46
Belgian Albums (Ultratop Flanders)	64
Belgian Albums (Ultratop Wallonia)	161
Dutch Albums (Album Top 100)	99
French Albums (SNEP)	125
German Albums (Offizielle Top 100)	25
Hungarian Albums (MAHASZ)	34
Spanish Albums (Promusicae)	56
Swiss Albums (Schweizer Hitparade)	18
