= Backhouse (surname) =

Backhouse is a surname. Notable people with the surname include:

- Alfred Paxton Backhouse (1851–1939), Australian judge, son of Benjamin
- Benjamin Backhouse (1829–1904), architect and politician in Australia
- Constance Backhouse (born 1952), Canadian legal scholar and historian
- Daniel Backhouse (1741–1811), English slave trader
- Edmund Backhouse (1824–1906), English banker, J.P., and MP for Darlington; son of Jonathan Backhouse (1779–1842).
- Sir Edmund Backhouse, 2nd Baronet (1873–1944), British would-be oriental scholar and literary forger; son of Jonathan Backhouse (1849–1918).
- Elizabeth Backhouse (1917–2013), Australian novelist, scriptwriter and playwright
- Flower Backhouse, Countess of Clarendon (d. 1700), First Lady of the Bedchamber; daughter of William Backhouse (1593–1662)
- Frank Backhouse (1863–1933), mining engineer in Western Australia, son of Benjamin
- James Backhouse (1794–1869), English botanist and Quaker missionary; a first cousin of Jonathan Backhouse (1779–1842)
- James Backhouse (iv) (1825–1890), botanist, archaeologist, and geologist; son of James Backhouse (1794–1869)
- Sir John Backhouse (1584–1649), English landowner and royalist; son of Samuel Backhouse (1554–1626)
- Jonathan Backhouse (1779–1842), banker
- Jonathan Backhouse (1849–1918), British baronet and banker; son of Edmund Backhouse (1824–1906)
- Oliver Backhouse (1875–1943), British admiral; son of Sir Jonathan Backhouse (1849–1918)
- Robert Backhouse (1854–1940), well-known horticulturist and British archer in the 1908 Olympics; great-nephew of Jonathan Backhouse (1779–1842).
- Sir Roger Backhouse (1878–1939), British admiral of the Royal Navy, First Sea Lord 1939; son of Sir Jonathan Backhouse (1849–1918)
- Roger Backhouse (economist), Professor of the History and Philosophy of Economics at the University of Birmingham
- Samuel Backhouse (1554–1626), English merchant and politician
- Tony Backhouse (born 1947), New Zealand musician
- William Backhouse (1593–1662), English alchemist and teacher of Elias Ashmole; son of Samuel Backhouse (1554–1626)
- William Ormston Backhouse (1885–1962), English agriculturalist and geneticist. Son of Robert Backhouse (1854–1940).
