= Bakos, Alexandria =

Bakos باكوس Bacus
- Location in Egypt
- Coordinates: 31.235555°N 29.957213°E
- Country: Egypt
- Governorate: Alexandria
- Time zone: UTC+2 (EET)
  - Summer (DST): UTC+3 (EEST)

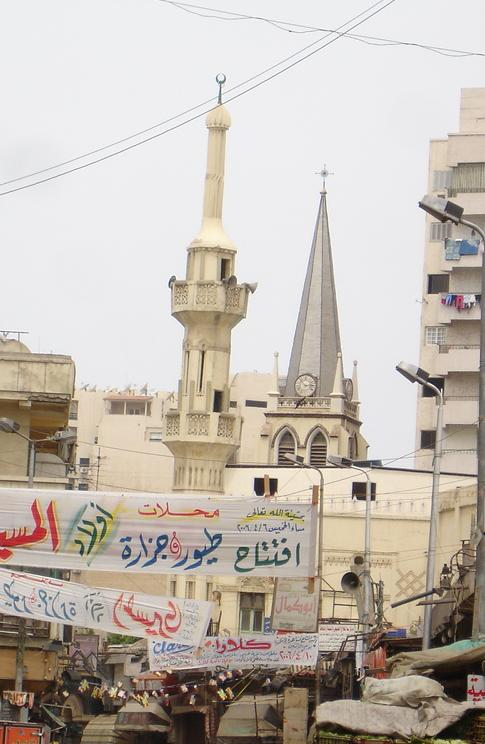
church next to the mosque in Baku

Bakos (Egyptian Arabic: باكوس), also known as Bacus, is a neighborhood in Alexandria, Egypt.

The neighborhood is best known for being the birthplace of Egyptian President Gamal Abdel Nasser, born in 1918.

== Gamal Abdel Nasser ==
The neighbourhood was the birthplace of Gamal Abdel Nasser, who led the Egyptian Revolution of 1952 to topple a line of kings in Egypt, later ousting his associate Mohammed Naguib and consolidating absolute power. He promoted Pan-Arabism and Arab socialism and issued a number of wide-reaching reforms in Egypt and his popularity enjoyed a large boost due to his adept and skilful managing of the Suez Crisis. During the Cold War, he was a founder of the Non-Aligned Movement and frequently used the nations (namely the Soviet Union and the United States of America) who wanted his support in the Arab world to his advantage. Despite resigning after a defeat by Israel in the Six Day War, he was reinstated by popular demand and when he died, there was an outpouring of grief in the Arab world. He was succeeded by Anwar Sadat. Even today in Egypt, there is a large amount of nostalgia for him and his policies, known as Nasserism.

== See also ==
- Neighborhoods in Alexandria
