= Backhaus =

Backhaus (lit. 'bakehouse') is a German surname. Notable people with the surname include:

- Georg F. Backhaus (born 1955), German agricultural scientist specializing in horticulture and phytomedicine
- George Henry Backhaus (1811–1882), German-Australian Catholic priest
- Gerd Backhaus (born 1942), German soccer player
- Hans-Georg Backhaus (1929–2026), German critic of political economy and philosopher
- Heiner Backhaus (born 1982), German soccer player and manager
- Helmuth M. Backhaus (1920–1989), German actor, screenwriter and film director
- Robin Backhaus (born 1955), American swimmer
- Robin Backhaus (German swimmer) (born 1989), German freestyle swimmer
- Till Backhaus (born 1959), German politician
- Wilf K. Backhaus (1946–2009), Canadian game designer, business professor, and lawyer
- Wilhelm Backhaus (1884–1969), German pianist
