= Kennar Lewis =

Jamaican cricketer

Personal information
- Born: 18 August 1991 (age 35); Jamaica
- Height: 1.94 m (6 ft 4 in)
- Batting: Right-handed
- Role: Opening batsman

Domestic team information
- Years: Team
- 2011–2014: Jamaica
- 2014: T&T Red Steel
- 2017–2021: Jamaica Tallawahs (squad no. 69)
- 2021: Kandy Warriors (squad no. 69)
- 2022: Chattogram Challengers
- 2024: Sylhet Strikers

Career statistics
Competition	FC	LA	T20
Matches	3	6	38
Runs scored	61	69	752
Batting average	10.16	11.50	20.32
100s/50s	0/0	0/0	0/4
Top score	18	28	89
Catches/stumpings	9/–	1/–	15/5
- Source: ESPNCricinfo, 26 July 2022

Kennar Lewis (born 18 August 1991) is a Jamaican cricketer who has played for both the Jamaica national team and the Trinidad and Tobago Red Steel in West Indian domestic cricket. He is a right-handed opening batsman.

Lewis made his List A debut for Jamaica in October 2011, playing against the Leeward Islands during the 2011–12 Regional Super50. He opened the batting with Chris Gayle on debut, and top-scored for Jamaica with 28 runs as his team won by seven wickets. Lewis played another four Regional Super50 matches during the 2011–12 season, including Jamaica's win over Trinidad and Tobago in the tournament final. He also played three matches in the 2011–12 Caribbean Twenty20. He returned to Jamaica's squad for the 2013–14 Regional Super50, but played only a single match, the semi-final against Trinidad and Tobago in which his team were bowled out for just 49 runs. For the 2014 Caribbean Premier League season, Lewis signed with the Red Steel, as the second-youngest member of the squad (after Nicholas Pooran). He played two matches, against the Antigua Hawksbills and the Guyana Amazon Warriors, and opened the batting with Irishman Kevin O'Brien in both, but scored just five runs and was subsequently dropped.

He made his first-class debut for Jamaica in the 2018–19 Regional Four Day Competition on 28 February 2019. In June 2021, he was selected to take part in the Minor League Cricket tournament in the United States following the players' draft. In the 2021 Caribbean Premier League, he finished the season as the top run-scorer for the Jamaica Tallawahs. This success led to his first selections in overseas T20 franchise leagues: by the Kandy Warriors in the Lanka Premier League, and the Chattogram Challengers in the Bangladesh Premier League. He also had a successful season for the Northern Warriors in the T10 League.
