= Edwin S. Diuguid House =

- U.S. National Register of Historic Places
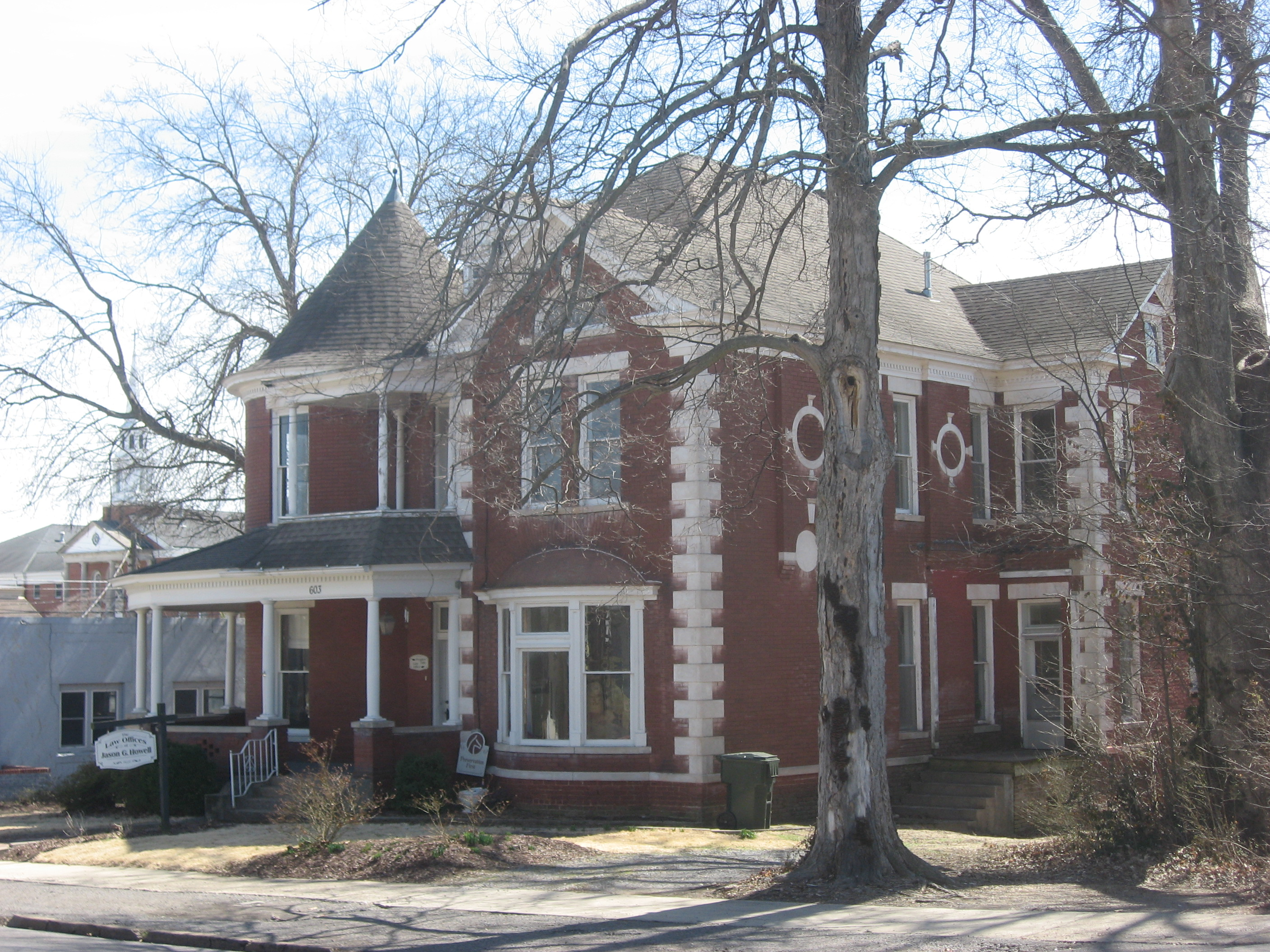

- Location within Kentucky Location within the United States
- Location: 601 W. Main St., Murray, Kentucky
- Coordinates: 36°36′38″N 88°18′15″W
- Area: 0.3 acres (0.12 ha)
- Built: 1895
- Architect: Alda Lafayette Lassiter
- Architectural style: Colonial Revival, Queen Anne, Romanesque
- NRHP reference No.: 76000855
- Added to NRHP: May 17, 1976

The Edwin S. Diuguid House, at 601 W. Main St. in Murray, Kentucky, was listed on the National Register of Historic Places in 1976. It has also been known as the Diuguid-Kirk House.

The house "was built in 1895 by Edwin S. Diuguid, Sr. A native of Calloway County he was a successful and respected merchant of Murray, Kentucky. The house, the first residence built with pressed brick and trimmed with stone in Murray, was one of the largest and most pretentious houses in the area before the turn of the century."

It was designed by architect Alda Lafayette Lassiter of Paducah, Kentucky.
