= Bacchus (Rubens) =

Painting by Peter Paul Rubens

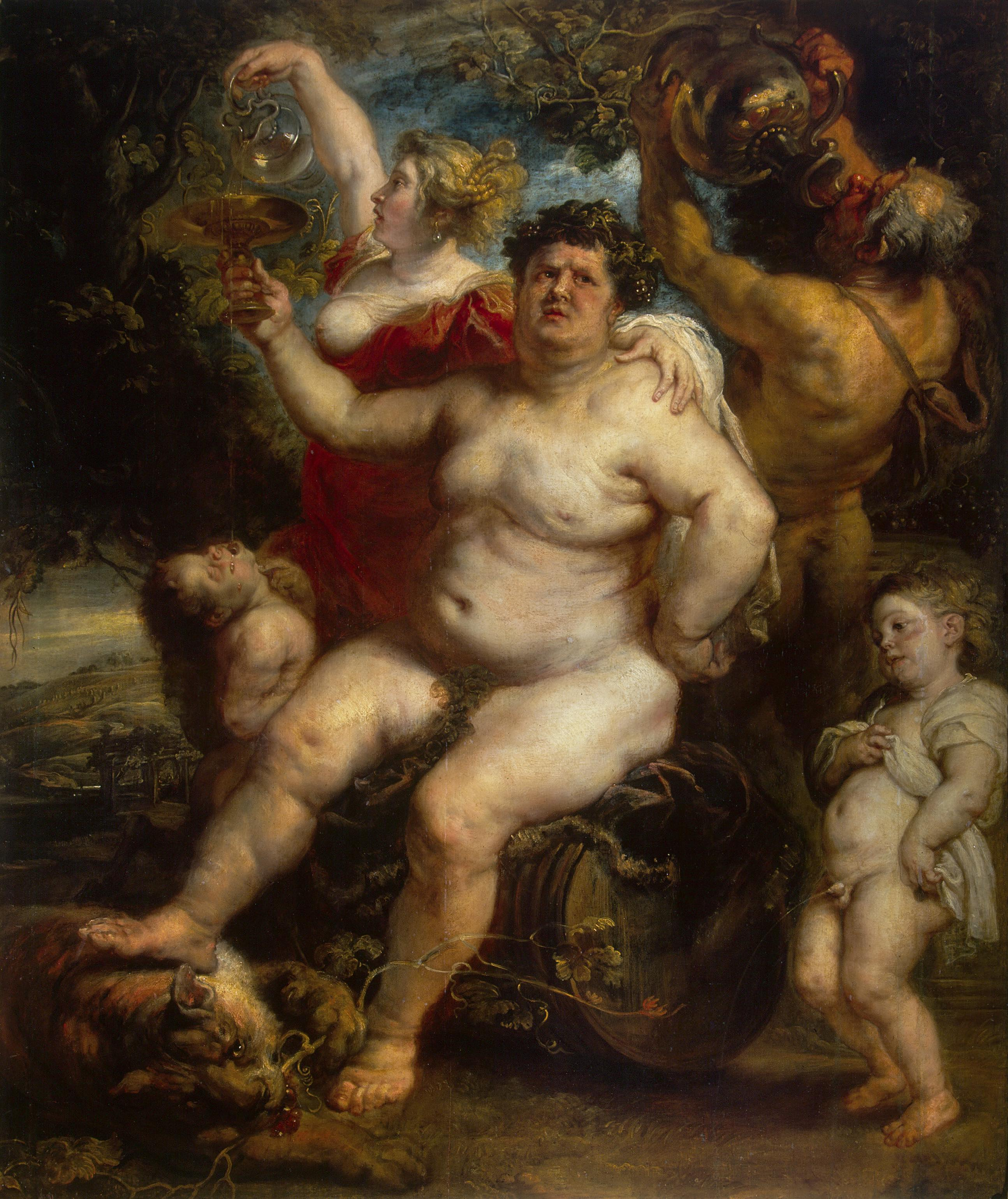
- Artist: Peter Paul Rubens
- Year: 1638-1640
- Medium: Oil on canvas
- Location: Hermitage Museum; St. Petersburg

Bacchus is a 1638-1640 oil painting of Bacchus by Peter Paul Rubens, now in the Hermitage Museum, in Saint Petersburg, for which it was purchased in 1772. It was originally on a panel support but was transferred to canvas in 1891 by A. Sidorov. An autograph copy of the work is now in the Uffizi in Florence.

The composition of Bacchus seated on a barrel of wine surrounded by a satyr, a woman and two putti draws on a similar one on the fountain painted by Hans Vredeman de Vries, whilst the head of Bacchus in Rubens' work is thought to have been based on a marble bust of Vitellius. It also draws on Mantegna's Bacchanalia (a work of which Rubens made a copy, now in the Louvre), Hans Baldung Grun's drawing of Bacchus and Titian's The Bacchanal of the Andrians, now in the Prado.

One of the few paintings still in the artist's studio on his death, it was left to his nephew Philip Rubens, who sold it to Prince Richelieu. It then passed to the Crozat collection and from there to the Hermitage.
