= First Baptist Church (Murray, Kentucky) =

Historic church in Kentucky, United States

- U.S. National Register of Historic Places
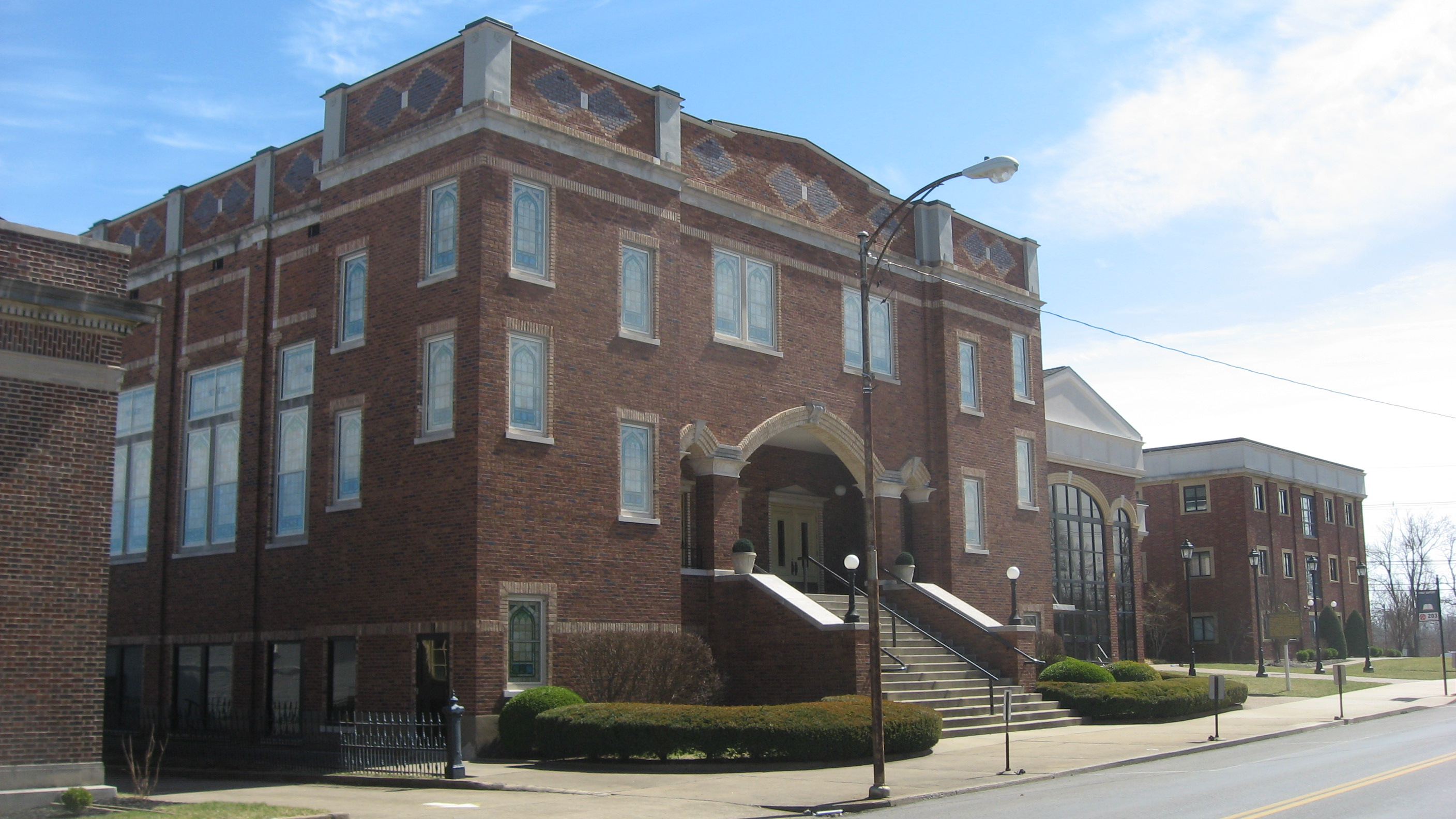
- Front and northern side, together with later addition to right

- Location within Kentucky Location within the United States
- Location: 203 S. Fourth St., Murray, Kentucky
- Coordinates: 36°36′33″N 88°18′5″W
- Area: 0.8 acres (0.32 ha)
- Built: 1924-1933
- Built by: Currie Lockett
- Architectural style: Eclectic
- NRHP reference No.: 86000289
- Added to NRHP: February 19, 1986

The First Baptist Church in Murray, Kentucky, is a historic Southern Baptist church established in 1846. It is known for its deep roots in the community, large building, and its pioneering role in shaping the financial structure of the Southern Baptist Convention. The church's current building, notable for its decorative brickwork and stained glass windows, earned it a spot on the National Register of Historic Places in 1986.

== Construction history ==
=== Former buildings ===
The congregation's first building was a simple frame church built in 1848 at a cost of $440. As the congregation grew, plans for a more substantial building began as early as 1879. In 1899, the church commissioned architect H. P. MacDonald and contractor W. R. Lassiter to construct a new building. The second building was completed in early 1900 at a total cost of $7,770 and was used until the early 1920s when the church outgrew it. It was demolished in 1924

=== Current building ===
In January 1924, a committee was appointed to secure plans for a new structure to accommodate the growing congregation. This structure was to include a auditorium with seating for 1000. Construction began in late 1924 under contractor Currie Lockett, who volunteered his services. To ensure that no debt was allowed to accumulate against the building, the congregation chose to build the structure on a "pay-as-you-go" basis. The church paid for labor and materials only as the funds were raised through offerings. Pastor H. Boyce Taylor, personally contributed several thousand dollars. To save costs, members of the congregation volunteered labor, including salvaging and cleaning bricks and wood from the demolished 1900 building. Progress was slow and was halted several times as funds were raised. By June 1927, the congregation began holding services in the unfinished structure, which at the time had only tar paper sub-flooring and no pews. The completed building was formally dedicated on October 25, 1936, at a total cost of over $130,000.

=== Additions and expansions ===
In the late 1940s, a shortage of space for Sunday School classes led the church to undertake a major building campaign. Under the leadership of Pastor H. C. Chiles, the church approved plans for a large Educational Building to be added onto the existing building in April 1949. The $97,000 structure was constructed quickly with extensive donated labor and services. The 84-room building opened May 21, 1950, resulting in a record-breaking Sunday School attendance of over 1,000 on its first day of use. This addition created an L-shaped building and was designed to be harmonious with the main structure.

In 1956, the church chose architect R.W. Key to design an expansion to the auditorium. The $141,000 project covered the lot at the rear of the building, and increased the rooms seating capacity to over 1,500. The renovation also included an interior remodeling. The newly renovated and expanded auditorium opened on June 22, 1958.

In 1994, a three-story, 21,000-square-foot addition to the educational building was erected costing approximately $1.5 million. Groundbreaking for the structure took place on April 11, 1993. This facility provided a dedicated educational space for all children and youth age groups.

In 2002, the church began a major renovation and addition to create a centralized Welcome Center. The project connected the historic sanctuary with the newer educational wings. The construction was managed by local construction firm Bill Adams Construction and was completed by 2004.

== Architecture and National Register listing ==
The church building was added to the National Register of Historic Places in 1986, due to its architectural significance. The building is eclectic in style and is characterized by "high artistic values in its exterior detailing". The building's most distinctive feature is the orange and blue glazed brick used in the exterior construction and decoration, a feature that is uncommon in the region. The creative use of inexpensive building materials, such as vertical brick in the belt courses and corbelling in the entrance arch, is seen as an ingenious response during a period of economic hardship.

The two-story sanctuary rests on a raised basement level. A large flight of steps leads up to a porch, where double brick piers support three pointed arches that define the top of the entrance. A stone cornice runs across the top of the building, above which rises a parapet wall embellished with diamond panels of blue glazed bricks.

One of the church's character defining features is its extensive use of stained glass. The façade features two pairs of windows situated above the porch, additional windows ascend alongside the sanctuary's interior staircases. Along the sides of the building, large double-pane windows with transom panes are organized into symmetrical bays, each separated by decorative brick pilasters. The windows feature a vibrant green Gothic arch design set against a field of amber glass. Additionally, the windows on the sides of the building feature intricate floral motifs.

== Legacy ==
=== Birth of the Cooperative Program ===
The Church is recognized as the birthplace of the financial system that became the Southern Baptist Convention's Cooperative Program. Around 1900, Pastor H. Boyce Taylor directed his congregation to implement the "Box Plan of Giving," This system used wooden offering boxes placed at each door. All the funds collected were divided up for ministry according to the budget the church had voted on. Due to its success, Taylor championed the plan statewide. The Kentucky Baptist Convention officially adopted the "unified budget plan" in 1915. Ten years later, in 1925, the model was adopted by the Southern Baptist Convention and renamed the Cooperative Program.

In 1981, the Kentucky Baptist Convention voted to place a Historical marker at the church, formally recognizing it as the birthplace of the Cooperative Program.

== Preservation and maintenance ==
=== Window controversy ===
In June 2011, the church entered a public dispute regarding the maintenance of its historic building when the congregation voted to seek approval to replace its original, deteriorating stained glass windows. An application was submitted to the Murray Architectural Review Board that proposed replacing the windows with a darker design that would allow less light to enter the room. The application was unanimously denied by the Board, who cited the church's status on the National Register of Historic Places. The Architectural Review Board argued that replacing the historic 80-year-old windows would compromise the building's historical integrity. Following the rejection, the church submitted a revised plan that proposed replacing the windows with near duplicates of the existing ones. The Architectural Review Board hesitatingly granted approval for the revised plan.

== See also ==
- National Register of Historic Places listings in Kentucky
