= Fahiem Bacchus =

Canadian professor of computer science

Fahiem Bacchus (March 16, 1957 – September 22, 2022) was a Canadian professor of computer science at the University of Toronto and a fellow of the Association for the Advancement of Artificial Intelligence (2006).

== Early life and career ==
Fahiem Bacchus was born in 1957. In 1979 he graduated with a Bachelor of Science degree in computer science from the University of Alberta. After working in industry for a couple of years he returned to academic pursuits and in 1983 received a Master of Science degree in mathematics from the University of Toronto. A year later he returned to the University of Alberta and graduated from there with a Ph.D. in computer science in 1988. Immediately after graduation he became a postdoc at the University of Rochester and in July of the same year he became an assistant professor at the University of Waterloo, achieving the rank of professor in 1999. He moved to the University of Toronto in 1999 and has been a professor in the department of computer science since then.
