= Backhouse (1798 ship) =

British slave ship (1798-1810)

History

Great Britain
- Name: Backhouse
- Namesake: Daniel Backhouse
- Owner: 1799: John Tarleton and Daniel Backhouse
- Builder: Dartmouth
- Launched: 1798
- Captured: 24 March 1810

General characteristics
- Tons burthen: Initial data:160, or 168 (bm); Later data: 258 (bm)
- Complement: 1806:35; 1808:25; 1809:25
- Armament: 1806: 18 × 6-pounder guns; 1808: 14 × 6-pounder guns + 2 × 12-pounder carronades; 1809: 12 × 6-pounder guns

Backhouse was launched in 1798, at Dartmouth. In all, she made four voyages as a slave ship in the triangular trade in enslaved people. Between the second and the third, and again after the fourth, she was a West Indiaman. A French privateer captured her early in 1810, as she was returning to Britain from Brazil.

== Career ==
Backhouse first appeared in Lloyd's Register (LR) in 1799.

Year	Master	Owner	Trade	Source
1799	J.Harvey	Tarleton & Co.	Dartmouth–Liverpool; Liverpool–Africa	LR

1st voyage transporting enslaved people (1799–1800): Captain John Harvey sailed from Liverpool on 10 May 1799, bound for West Africa. In 1799, 156 British vessels sailed on enslaving voyages. Of these, 134 sailed from Liverpool.

Backhouse acquired captives at Anomabu and arrived at Saint Croix on 20 November, with 257 captives. At some point Captain Crocker replaced Harvey. Backhouse, Crocke, master, arrived back at Liverpool on 8 March 1800. She had left Liverpool with 32 crew members and she had suffered two crew deaths on the voyage.

At the time Saint Croix was a Danish colony. In 1792, the Danish government passed a law that would outlaw Danish participation in the trans-Atlantic enslaving trade, from early 1803 on. This led the government in the Danish West Indies to encourage the importation of captives prior to the ban taking effect. One measure that it took was to open the trade to foreign vessels. Records for the period 1796 to 1799, show that 24 British ships, most of them from Liverpool, arrived at St Croix with 6,781 captives.

2nd voyage transporting enslaved people (1800–1802): Captain Henry Tyrer sailed from Liverpool on 22 October 1800. In 1800, 133 British vessels sailed on enslaving voyages. Of these, 120 sailed from Liverpool.

Backhouse acquired captives at the Cameroons, and then Rio Dande (Northern Angola). She arrived at Grenada on 16 September 1801, and left on 7 November. She arrived back at Liverpool on 22 January 1802.

Without original research it is currently impossible to determine Backhouse's employment between her return from her second voyage transporting enslaved people, and 1805. The registers were only as accurate as owners chose to keep them. In 1805 Backhouse, Keen, master, sailed between Liverpool and Berbice.

Year	Master	Owner	Trade	Source
1805	J.Harvey; T.Keen	Tarleton; D.Backhouse	Liverpool–Africa	
1806	T.Keene; Roberts	Backhouse; Livingston & Co.	Liverpool–Berbice	LR

3rd voyage transporting enslaved people (1806–1807): Captain Thomas Roberts acquired a letter of marque on 26 March 1806. He sailed from Liverpool on 26 April 1806. Backhouse acquired captives at Bonny. On 2 October 1806, Captain Roberts died. Captain William Foster replaced Roberts.

Backhouse arrived at Kingston, Jamaica on 31 October, with 312 captives. She sailed from Kingston on 28 January 1807, and arrived back at Liverpool on 6 April. She had left Liverpool with 37 crew members and had suffered seven crew deaths on the voyage.

Year	Master	Owner	Trade	Source
1807	Roberts; M'Key	Livingston	Liverpool–Africa	LR

4th voyage transporting enslaved people (1807–1808): Captain James Mackie sailed from Liverpool on 18 May 1807. The Slave Trade Act 1807 had abolished British participation in the transatlantic slave trade, effective 1 May 1807. However, vessels such as Backhouse, which had received a clearance to sail before the deadline, could still depart. (Note: Kitty's Amelia had received clearance to sail on 27 April, before the deadline. Thus, when she sailed on 27 July, she did so legally. This was the last legal slave voyage for a British vessel.)

Backhouse acquired captives in New Calabar. She arrived at Kingston, Jamaica, on 28 November, with 268 captives. She sailed from Kingston on 27 April 1808, and arrived in Liverpool on 30 June. She had left Liverpool with 33 crew members and had suffered five crew deaths on the voyage.

Year	Master	Owner	Trade	Source
1808	M'Key; Keenan	Livingston	Liverpool–Africa	LR

Captain Archibald Keenan acquired a letter of marque on 10 October 1808.

Year	Master	Owner	Trade	Source
1809	A.Keenan; Scotland	M'Vickers	Liverpool–New Orleans	LR

Captain Alexander Scotland acquired a letter of marque on 25 September 1809. LR for 1810 showed Backhouse's trade as Liverpool to the Braziles.

== Fate ==
The French privateer brig Grand Napoleon captured Backhouse, Scotland, master, on 24 March 1810, in 51°30′N 18°00′W as Backhouse was returning to Liverpool from the Braziles. Grand Napoleon, of 16 guns and 120 men, was out thirteen days from Brest, France. (Note: Grand Napoléon was almost certainly the Grand Napoleon of Nantes that HMS Helena captured on 19 April 1810. Grand Napoleon, of about 240 tons (bm), was armed with twelve 18-pounder carronades and four long guns. She had a crew of 124 men. She was three months old. She had been commissioned at Nantes in 1810.) Backhouse arrived at Morlaix. LR for 1811 carried the annotation "captured" beneath Backhouse's name.

Grand Napoléon put Captain Scotland, his passengers, and his crew on a brig that had been sailing from New Brunswick to Cork when the brig was captured. The privateer gave up the brig to the prisoners.
