= Young Couple =

Sculpture by Tullio Lombardo

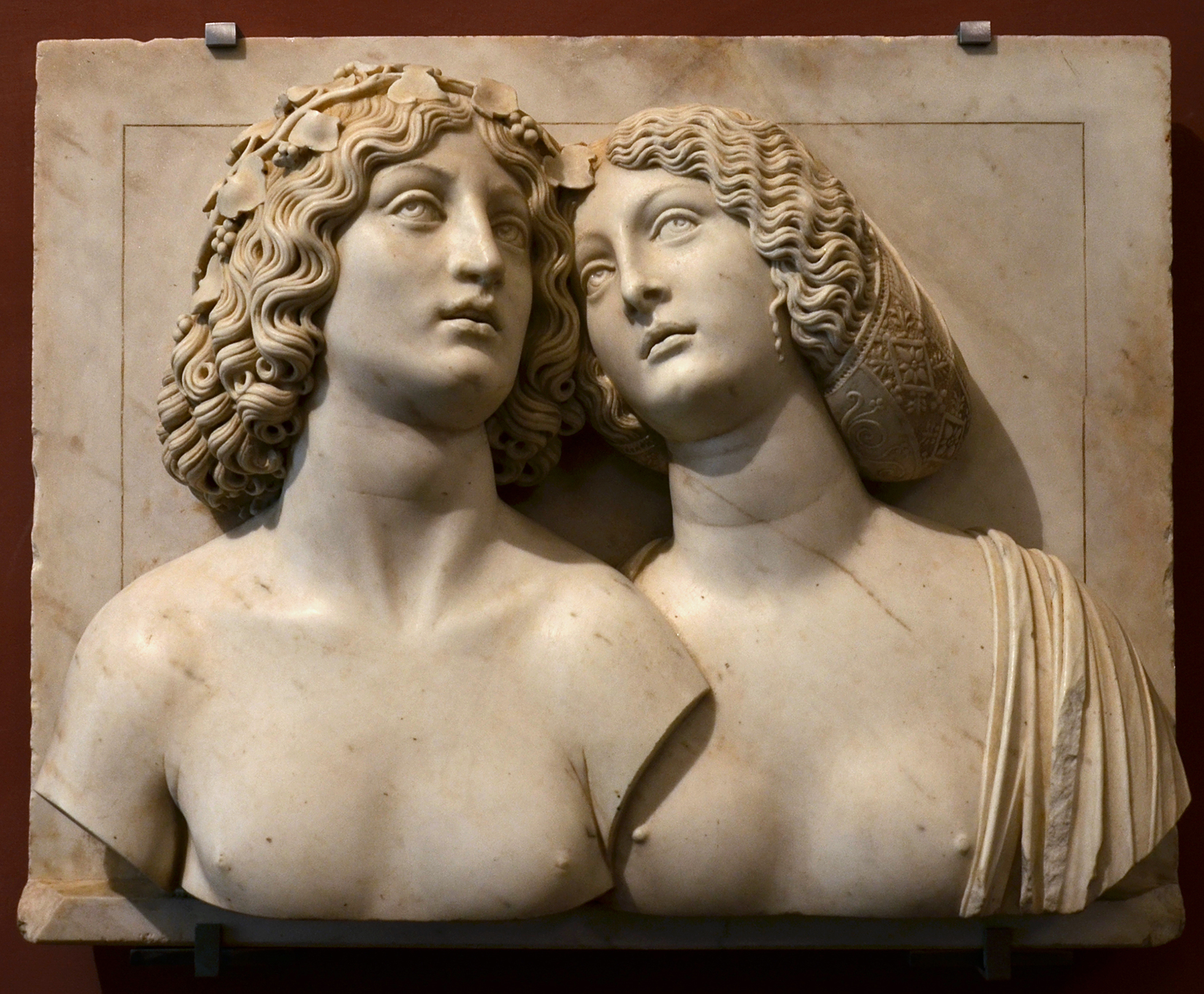

Young Couple is a c.1505-1510 Carrara marble relief sculpture by Tullio Lombardo, now in the Kunsthistorisches Museum in Vienna. It was previously known as Bacchus and Ariadne, whilst a recent study by Claudia Kryza-Gersch has suggested the alternative title of The Singing Poet and His Lover.

It shows two busts on a rectangular background, drawing on similar works not only in ancient Roman funerary portraits but also North European double portrait paintings, the latter also sometimes adopted by Venetian painters in the early 16th century. Its mature classicism and the subjects' poetic mood also draws on paintings by Giorgione. A similar Double Portrait of a Young Couple is now in Venice's Galleria Franchetti. The possible depiction of its subjects as Bacchus and Ariadne seems to derive from Francesco Colonna's allegorical novel Hypnerotomachia Poliphili, published in Venice in 1499, with a printed illustration of that pair in the same pose as the sculpture.
