= Backus, West Virginia =

Unincorporated community in West Virginia, United States

- Unincorporated community
- Location within West Virginia Location within the United States
- Coordinates: 37°51′15″N 80°58′29″W
- Country: United States
- State: West Virginia
- County: Fayette
- Elevation: 2,497 ft (761 m)
- Time zone: UTC-5 (Eastern (EST))
  - Summer (DST): UTC-4 (EDT)
- GNIS ID: 1553774

Backus is an unincorporated community in Fayette County, West Virginia, United States. It was also known as Naoma and War Ridge.

W. P. Backus, an early postmaster, gave the community his name.
