= Bacchus (play) =

Bacchus is a 1951 play written by French dramatist Jean Cocteau. His last full-length play, it is set in a small German town in 1523, which is holding a Bacchic carnival. As part of the festivities, the village idiot is declared king for a week, and he suddenly becomes rational "and preaches an anarchic message of love and freedom, which results in his being sentenced to burn at the stake."

It was opened in Théâtre Marigny in December 1951. A few days later François Mauriac attacked the play in Le Figaro littéraire accusing Cocteau of committing heresy.

It was translated into English by Mary Hoeck as Bacchus. The translation has been published in The Infernal Machine and Other Plays (1963). In 1952 the work was translated into German by Charles Regnier and Gerd von Rhein; the first German performance has been in the Düsseldorfer Schauspielhaus in Düsseldorf on 18 October 1952, directed by Gustaf Gruendgens, attended by the author and with Martin Benrath as Bacchus.
