= Edward Burdette Backus =

American Unitarian Minister and Humanist

Edwin Burdette Backus (1888–1955) was an American Unitarian minister and humanist.

This man goes by the name Burdette Backus, or E. Burdette Backus.

The following is by Edd Doerr from his preface to "Timely and Timeless: The Wisdom of E. Burdette Backus" Edd Doerr, Editor, Humanist Press, Amherst, New York, 1988, pp. ix-x.

"Edwin Burdette Backus was born in Blanchester, Ohio, on December 27, 1888. His father, Wilson Marvin Backus, was a leading Universalist minister. His mother, Estelle Campbell Backus, also a Universalist minister, died before Burdette was a year old.

Backus received his A.B. degree from the University of Michigan in 1909 and his B.A. from Meadville Theological Seminary in 1912. He pursued post-graduate studies at Oxford, Harvard, the University of California, and universities in Berlin and Jena, Germany, and was awarded a D.D. degree in 1940 by Meadville. After serving as minister of Unitarian congregations in Lawrence, Kansas; Erie, Pennsylvania; and Des Moines, Iowa (1935-38); as well as the Chicago Humanist Society, he was called to the pulpit of All Souls Unitarian Church in Indianapolis in 1938. There he served until the end of 1953. He died on July 7, 1955, at the age of 66."

Burdette Backus was the minister of the First Unitarian Church of Los Angeles from 1920 to 1932.

He was one of the original signatories of the Humanist Manifesto (1933).
