= Backusburg Mounds =

- Archeological Site 15CW64
- U.S. National Register of Historic Places
- Location within Kentucky Location within the United States
- Location: Ridgeline 0.25 miles (0.40 km) southeast of Backusburg, along the Clarks River
- Nearest city: Backusburg, Kentucky
- Coordinates: 36°42′9″N 88°27′39″W
- Area: 6.5 acres (2.6 ha)
- NRHP reference No.: 85001506
- Added to NRHP: July 11, 1985

The Backusburg Mounds (15-CW-64) are an archaeological site in the Jackson Purchase region of the U.S. state of Kentucky. Located near the tiny community of Backusburg in northwestern Calloway County, the mounds are one of the region's premier archaeological sites. Since at least the early years of the twentieth century, the mounds have been well known locally, due partially to their large size; the largest mound measures 150 by 75 feet (46 m × 23 m) at the base. Located on a ridgeline above a fork of the Clarks River, the mound bears a peculiar shape; its size and shape have caused observers to suggest that it might actually be the remnants of a series of smaller mounds placed next to each other. As late as the 1930s, this largest mound had never been plowed; it lay in dense woodland, and among the trees growing upon it were some of considerable size. Nevertheless, the mound has not been preserved entirely without damage; various parts of the mound have been dug into at various times and have yielded numerous artifacts. Such findings are not unprecedented in the area; a field close to Backusburg has long produced skeletons, projectile points, and pottery when plowed, leading to its identification as a former village site.

Archaeologists first learned of the site in the 1920s, but only one scholarly investigation was conducted at the site during the twentieth century; it was performed largely by a team of students from the nearby Murray State University under the leadership of archaeologist Kenneth Carstens in 1981. Although Murray State only had one day's access to the site, the team was able to produce maps of the site that enabled its boundaries to be determined accurately, and the materials they collected from the surface enabled Carstens to study the site's cultural affiliation; it has since been determined to be a work of a Mississippian people. Four years later, the mound complex was listed on the National Register of Historic Places under its Smithsonian trinomial designation of 15-CW-64; it is Calloway County's only National Register-listed archaeological site and one of thirteen in the Jackson Purchase with this designation. Additional work was finally conducted at Backusburg in mid-2013, as another team of Murray State archaeology students was assigned to document the site more carefully for their field school. At the same time, the property was in the middle of being bought by The Archaeological Conservancy, an organization whose raison d'être is purchasing archaeological sites in order to preserve them.
