= Robin Bacchus =

West Indian cricketer (born 1989)

Personal information
- Full name: Robin Emerson Bacchus
- Born: 27 April 1989 (age 37); Guyana
- Source: Cricinfo, 12 November 2017

Robin Bacchus (born 27 April 1989) is a Guyanese cricketer. He played his only List A cricket match for Guyana national cricket team in the Nagico Super50 2013–2014 on 8 February 2014.
