= Bacchus (1786 ship) =

British merchant and slave ship (1786–1807)

History

Great Britain
- Name: Bacchus
- Namesake: Bacchus
- Launched: 1775, Bristol
- Fate: Condemned 1807

General characteristics
- Tons burthen: 1775: 225, or 240 (bm); 1796: 295, or 311 (bm)
- Complement: 1799: 30; 1803: 34
- Armament: 1799: 15 × 9-pounder guns; 1803: 6 × 9-pounder guns

Bacchus was launched in 1775, at Bristol, almost surely under another name. She first appeared in online records as Bacchus in 1786, sailing as a West Indiaman. From 1799 to 1807, she was a slave ship in the triangular trade in enslaved people. She was condemned in 1807, at Trinidad after she had delivered the captives she had brought on her fifth voyage transporting enslaved people.

== Career ==
Bacchus entered Lloyd's Register (LR), in 1786. The issue of Lloyd's Register for 1785 is not available on line, so there is no clear indication of what her name was before Samuel Span purchased her.

Year	Master	Owner	Trade	Source & notes
1786	Hamilton	S. Span	Bristol–Antigua	LR; repair 1783
1791	Hamilton	S. Span	Virginia–Bristol; Bristol–St Vincent	LR; new deck and wales & thorough repair 1785
1795	Hamilton	Protheroe	Bristol–St Vincent	LR; new deck and wales & thorough repair 1785
1799	Hamilton; John Ford	Protheroe & Co.	Bristol–Jamaica	LR; new deck and wales & thorough repair 1785, repairs 1795, & lengthened 1799
1800	J. Ford	Weston & Co.	Bristol–Barbados	LR; new deck and wales & thorough repair 1785, repairs 1795, & lengthened 1799

1st voyage transporting enslaved people(1799–1800): Captain John Ford acquired a letter of marque on 17 July 1799. He sailed from Bristol on 7 September. In 1799, 156 vessels sailed from English ports to engage in the transport of enslaved people; five of these vessels sailed from Bristol.

Bacchus acquired captives at Calabar. Bacchus touched at Barbados before arriving at Montego Bay, Jamaica on 27 April 1800. Ford died before she reached Barbados; he had died on 19 November 1799, on his third journey as captain of a vessel transporting enslaved people. James Lea replaced Ford as master on Bacchus. She sailed from Jamaica on 20 July, and arrived at Liverpool on 29 September. She had left Bristol with 53 crew members and she suffered 22 crew deaths on her voyage.

Year	Master	Owner	Trade	Source & notes
1801	J. Ford; James Lea	Weston & Co.	Bristol–Barbados	LR; new deck and wales & thorough repair 1785, repairs 1795, lengthened 1796, & damages repaired 1801
1803	James Lea	Weston & Co.	Bristol–Barbados; Liverpool–Africa	LR; new deck and wales & thorough repair 1785, repairs 1795, lengthened 1796, & damages repaired 1801

2nd voyage transporting enslaved people (1803–1804): Bacchus sailed from Liverpool on 7 March 1803. In 1803, 99 vessels sailed from English ports to engage in the transport of enslaved people; 83 of these vessels sailed from Liverpool. Captain Alexander Nicholson acquired a letter of marque on 2 August.

Bacchus acquired captives at Angola and touched at Barbados. She arrived at Demerara on 8 October 1803, with 280 captives. She sailed from Demerara on 2 December and arrived back at Liverpool on 24 January 1804. She had left Liverpool with 36 crew members and she had no crew deaths on her voyage.

Between March and September 1804, Nicholson sailed Woolton to the West Indies and back.

Year	Master	Owner	Trade	Source & notes
1805	J. Lea; Nicholson	Weston & Co.	Liverpool–Africa	LR; new deck and wales & thorough repair 1785, repairs 1795, lengthened 1796, & damages repaired 1801

3rd voyage transporting enslaved people (1804–1805): Captain Richard Hughes sailed from Liverpool on 29 April 1804. In 1804, 147 vessels sailed from English port to engage in the transport of enslaved people; 120 of these vessels sailed from Liverpool.

Bacchus acquired captives at Old Calabar and arrived at Kingston on 28 January 1805, with 277 captives. Bacchus sailed from Kingston on 21 April, and arrived back at Liverpool on 6 July. She had left Liverpool with 43 crew members and had suffered six crew deaths on her voyage.

4th voyage transporting enslaved people (1805–1806): Captain Alexander Nicholson sailed from Liverpool on 27 September 1805.

Bacchus acquired captives at Accra and Anomabu, where she was reported on 26 March, but died on 2 May 1806, shortly before Bacchus sailed from Africa on 28 May, with Eliot Arthy as master. She arrived at Suriname on 16 July, and sailed for Liverpool on 7 November. She arrived at Liverpool on 17 January 1807. She had left Liverpool with 48 crew members and had suffered four crew deaths on her voyage. She brought back with her sugar, cotton, camwood, and ivory.

5th voyage transporting enslaved people (1807–sale): Captain Thomas Houghton sailed from Liverpool on 30 April 1807, just before the 1 May deadline for the end of British participation in the transatlantic trade in enslaved people. He acquired captives at Calabar and arrived at Trinidad and Tobago on 21 December 1807. Bacchus had left Liverpool with 41 crew members and had suffered eight crew deaths on her voyage.

== Fate ==
The database on the trans-Atlantic slave trade reports that Bacchus was condemned at Trinidad. The last mention of her with Houghton, master, reported that she had arrived at Trinidad and was selling there. The registers continued to carry her for several years with stale data, but she did not appear in ship arrival and departure data in the press.

Year	Master	Owner	Trade	Source & notes
1807	Nicholson; E.Arby	Weston & Co.	Liverpool–Africa	LR; new deck and wales & thorough repair 1785, repairs 1795, lengthened 1796, & damages repaired 1801
1808	E.Artry	Weston & Co.	Liverpool–Africa	LR; lengthened 1796 & damages repaired 1801
