= Backusburg, Kentucky =

Unincorporated community in Kentucky, United States

- Unincorporated community
- Location within the state of Kentucky Backusburg (the United States)
- Coordinates: 36°42′21″N 88°28′6″W
- Country: United States
- State: Kentucky
- County: Calloway
- Elevation: 433 ft (132 m)
- Time zone: UTC-6 (Central (CST))
  - Summer (DST): UTC-5 (CST)
- GNIS feature ID: 507433

Backusburg is an unincorporated community in Calloway County, Kentucky, United States.

Two different archaeological sites are located near the community; one of them, known as the Backusburg Mounds, is one of the premier sites throughout the Jackson Purchase. A post office was first established at the site on April 27, 1846, as Clarks River, Kentucky. This post office was closed on July 6, 1860. The post office was re-established on November 7, 1873, as Backusburg. The town is said to have been named after Asa Backus (who co-owned a sawmill) after he won a coin flip with another man.
