= William Ormston Backhouse =

English agriculturalist and geneticist (1885–1962)

- Born: 1885
- Died: 1962 (aged 76–77)
- Scientific career
- Fields: Botany, agricultural and genetics

William Ormston Backhouse (1885 – 1962) was an English agriculturalist and geneticist, and a member of the Backhouse family of County Durham, several generations of which were influential in the development of horticulture.

William Ormston Backhouse worked for a period of fíve years at the Cambridge Plant Breeding Station and the John Innes Institute, but left Britain to become a geneticist for the Argentine Government. He established a number of wheat-breeding stations in Argentina, then moved to Patagonia, where he reared pigs, grew apples and other fruits and started intensive honey production. He returned to England and bred red-trumpet daffodils at Sutton Court.
