= West Indies Academy cricket team in Ireland in 2024 =

International cricket tour

	Emerging Ireland	West Indies Academy
- Dates: 11 – 28 June 2024
Captains	Matthew Humphreys (List A); Stephen Doheny (First-class) (Note: Andrew Balbirnie captained Emerging Ireland in the 2nd unofficial Test.)	Nyeem Young (Note: Teddy Bishop captained West Indies Academy in the 2nd unofficial Test.)

FC series
- Result: Emerging Ireland won the 2-match series 2–0
Most runs	Christopher De Freitas (114)	Kadeem Alleyne (182)
Most wickets	Matthew Humphreys (15)	Johann Layne (10)

LA series
- Result: Emerging Ireland won the 3-match series 3–0
Most runs	Morgan Topping (165)	Jewel Andrew (160)
Most wickets	Gavin Hoey (7)	Johann Layne (5); Nyeem Young (5)

The West Indies Academy cricket team toured Ireland in June 2024 to play the Emerging Ireland cricket team. The tour consist of three List A and two first-class matches.

== Squads ==
Emerging Ireland		West Indies Academy
List A	First-class	List A and First-class
Matthew Humphreys (c); Cade Carmichael; Christopher De Freitas; Jake Egan; Matthew Foster; Kian Hilton; Gavin Hoey; Seamus Lynch; Scott Macbeth; Liam McCarthy; Thomas Mayes; Oliver Riley; Cian Robertson; Morgan Topping; Reuben Wilson	Stephen Doheny (c); Cade Carmichael; Christopher De Freitas; Jake Egan; Matthew Foster; Fionn Hand; Gavin Hoey; Matthew Humphreys; Liam McCarthy; Thomas Mayes; James McCollum; Morgan Topping; Reuben Wilson	Nyeem Young (c); Teddy Bishop (vc); Kadeem Alleyne; Jewel Andrew; Ackeem Auguste; Joshua Bishop; McKenny Clarke; Joshua James; Jordan Johnson; Leonardo Julian; Johann Layne; Ashmead Nedd; Kelvin Pitman; Ramon Simmonds; Carlon Bowen-Tuckett

Cricket Ireland also announced squad for 2nd unofficial Test match after Ireland Men exit the ICC Men's T20 World Cup before the Super 8 stage. Andrew Balbirnie captaining the team along with following players: Curtis Campher, Fionn Hand, Matthew Foster, Thomas Mayes, Andy McBrine, Liam McCarthy, PJ Moor, Paul Stirling, Harry Tector, Lorcan Tucker and Reuben Wilson.

== Unofficial ODI series ==
=== 1st unofficial ODI ===
11 June 2024
Scorecard

West Indies Academy; 224 (43.1 overs)	v	Emerging Ireland; 227/4 (46.5 overs)
Leonardo Julien 82 (61); Matthew Foster 2/29 (7 overs)		Morgan Topping 66* (85); Johann Layne 2/36 (8 overs)

Emerging Ireland won by 6 wickets
Woodvale Road, Eglinton
Umpires: George Brolly (Ire) and Gareth Morrison (Ire)

- Emerging Ireland won the toss and elected to field.

=== 2nd unofficial ODI ===
12 June 2024
Scorecard

West Indies Academy; 278/8 (50 overs)	v	Emerging Ireland; 282/9 (49.5 overs)
Jewel Andrew 143 (141); Liam McCarthy 3/80 (10 overs)		Christopher De Freitas 84 (108); Johann Layne 3/55 (10 overs)

Emerging Ireland won by 1 wickets
Bready Cricket Club Ground, County Tyrone
Umpires: Jareth McCready (Ire) and Gareth Morrison (Ire)

- Emerging Ireland won the toss and elected to field.
- Oliver Riley (Emerging Ireland) made his List A debut.

=== 3rd unofficial ODI ===
14 June 2024
Scorecard

West Indies Academy; 236 (43 overs)	v	Emerging Ireland; 238/6 (39 overs)
Ackeem Auguste 81 (68); Gavin Hoey 4/45 (10 overs)		Morgan Topping 46 (50); Nyeem Young 3/56 (9 overs)

Emerging Ireland won by 4 wickets
Bready Cricket Club Ground, County Tyrone
Umpires: George Brolly (Ire) and Jonathan Kennedy (Ire)

- West Indies Academy won the toss and elected to bat.
- Onaje Amory (West Indies Academy) made his List A debut.

== Unofficial Test series ==
=== 1st unofficial Test ===
18-21 June 2024
Scorecard

Emerging Ireland	v	West Indies Academy
283 (91.3 overs); Christopher De Freitas 88 (125); Johann Layne 4/84 (19 overs)		214 (49.1 overs); Nyeem Young 48* (55); Thomas Mayes 4/61 (11.4 overs)
274 (74 overs); Cade Carmichael 92 (164); Johann Layne 5/39 (613overs)		271 (56.4 overs); Kadeem Alleyne 93 (84); Gavin Hoey 4/81 (19 overs)

Emerging Ireland won by 72 runs
The Green, Comber
Umpires: Roland Black (Ire) and Aidan Seaver (Ire)

- West Academy won the toss and elected to field.
- Only 67 overs of play was possible on day 1 due to rain and wet outfield.
- Christopher De Freitas, Gavin Roulston (Emerging Ireland) Onaje Amory and Leonardo Julien (West Indies Academy) all made their First-class debuts.
- Jordan Johnson (West Indies Academy) replaced Jewel Andrew as a concussion substitute during the first innings of the match.

=== 2nd unofficial Test ===
25-28 June 2024
Scorecard

West Indies Academy	v	Emerging Ireland
200 (56 overs); Teddy Bishop 69 (110); Matthew Humphreys 5/57 (15 overs)		441 (112.5 overs); Andrew Balbirnie 88 (134); Joshua Bishop 2/72 (31 overs)
268 (73.3 overs); Ackeem Auguste 93 (154); Matthew Humphreys 5/44 (17 overs)		30/0 (3.5 overs); James McCollum 14* (13)

Emerging Ireland won by 10 wickets
Stormont, Belfast
Umpires: Jonathan Kennedy (Ire) and Gareth Morrison (Ire)

- West Indies Academy won the toss and elected to bat.
- Only 63 overs of play was possible on day 1 due to rain and wet outfield.
