= 2023–24 Super50 Cup =

Cricket tournament

2023 Super50 Cup
- Dates: 17 October 2023 – 11 November 2023
- Administrator(s): Cricket West Indies
- Cricket format: List A (50 overs)
- Tournament format(s): Group stage, finals
- Champions: Trinidad and Tobago (14th title)
- Participants: 8
- Matches: 31
- Most runs: (Trinidad and Tobago) Darren Bravo (416)
- Most wickets: (Trinidad and Tobago) Sunil Narine (20)

The 2023–24 Super50 Cup was the 49th edition of the Super50 Cup, the domestic limited-overs cricket competition for the countries of the Cricket West Indies (CWI). The tournament was played from 17 October to 11 November 2023 in Trinidad and Tobago.

The tournament consisted of eight teams: Barbados, Guyana, Jamaica, the Leeward Islands, Trinidad and Tobago, the Windward Islands, the Combined Campuses and Colleges, and a West Indies Academy. Jamaica were the defending champions.

== Points system ==
As per previous edition the following points were awarded: 4 for a win; 2 for a no result; and 0 for a loss. However, in addition to this, a new bonus point system was introduced where additional points were awarded for teams meetings various performance targets. The system was introduced by white ball coach Daren Sammy to build a certain brand of cricket amongst the regional teams. The bonus point system aims to tackle issues such as low strike rate, dot balls, strike rotation, death bowling etc. The following tables outline the bonus points allocation.

Batting
	40-50 Over Games	30 - 39 Over Games	20 - 29 Over Games	Points
Powerplay 1	6 RPO + less than 2 Wickets	7 RPO + less than 2 Wickets	8 RPO + less than 2 Wickets	1 Point
Powerplay 2	5 RPO + less than 4 Wickets	6 RPO + less than 4 Wickets	7 RPO + less than 4 Wickets	1 Point
Powerplay 3	10 RPO + less than 10 Wickets	11 RPO + less than 10 Wickets	12 RPO + less than 10 Wickets	1 Point
Totals	300+	240+	200+	1 Point
Complete Chase	Overs under 90% of allotment	Overs under 90% of allotment	Overs under 90% of allotment	1 Point

Bowling
	40-50 Over Games	30 - 39 Over Games	20 - 29 Over Games	Points
Powerplay 1	Wickets 3 or more	Wickets 3 or more	Wickets 3 or more	1 Point
Powerplay 2	Wickets 5 or more	Wickets 5 or more	Wickets 5 or more	1 Point
Powerplay 3 of earlier	Wickets 10	Wickets 10	Wickets 10	1 Point
Restriction Powerplay 3	Runs Per Over – less than 6	Runs Per Over – less than 7	Runs Per Over – less than 8	1 Point

Bonus
	40-50 Over Games	30 - 39 Over Games	20 - 29 Over Games	Points
Dot Ball Percentage	Under 50% over the innings	Under 45% over the innings	Under 40% over the innings	2 Points
Batters 1 - 5 Centurion(s)	Strike Rate: more than or equal 90	Strike Rate: more than or equal 100	Strike Rate: more than or equal 120	1 Point
Batter 6 - 11 Centurion(s)	Strike Rate: more than or equal 110	Strike Rate: more than or equal 120	Strike Rate: more than or equal 120	1 Point
4+ Wicket Haul	Runs Per Over: less than or equal 5	Runs Per Over: less than or equal 6	Runs Per Over: less than or equal 8	1 Point
5+ Wicket Haul	Runs Per Over: less than or equal 6	Runs Per Over: less than or equal 7	Runs Per Over: less than or equal 9	1 Point
Fielding Team	Effect 2 Runouts	Effect 2 Runouts	Effect 2 Runouts	1 Point

== Squads ==
Barbados Head Coach: Vasbert Drakes	Guyana Head Coach: Ryan Hercules	Jamaica Head Coach: Nikita Miller	Leeward Islands Head Coach: Stuart Williams	Trinidad and Tobago Head Coach: David Furlonge	Windward Islands Head Coach: Kenroy Peters	Combined Campuses & Colleges Head Coach: Floyd Reifer	West Indies Academy Head Coach: Andre Coley
Shai Hope (C); Kraigg Brathwaite; Shamarh Brooks; Roston Chase; Dominic Drakes; Akeem Jordan; Javed Leacock; Kyle Mayers; Jair McAllister; Zachary McCaskie; Roshon Primus; Raymon Reifer; Kemar Smith; Jomel Warrican	Veerasammy Permaul (C); Tevin Imlach(vc); Kelvon Anderson; Ronsford Beaton; Tagenarine Chanderpaul; Chandrapaul Hemraj; Shimron Hetmyer; Gudakesh Motie; Sherfane Rutherford; Quentin Sampson; Kemol Savory; Romario Shepherd; Kevin Sinclair; Niall Smith	Rovman Powell (C); Fabian Allen; Brad Barnes; Jermaine Blackwood; Nkrumah Bonner; Dennis Bulli; Sheldon Cottrell; Nicholson Gordon; Andre McCarthy; Kirk McKenzie; Shalome Parnell; Jeavor Royal; Odean Smith; Chadwick Walton	Alzarri Joseph (C); Rahkeem Cornwall (vc); Jewel Andrew; Keacy Carty; Terrence Warde; Daniel Doram; Karima Gore; Justin Greaves; Jahmar Hamilton; Kofi James; Jeremiah Louis; Kieran Powell; Oshane Thomas; Hayden Walsh Jr.	Darren Bravo (C); Joshua Da Silva (vc); Yannic Cariah; Mark Deyal; Shannon Gabriel; Terrance Hinds; Akeal Hosein; Evin Lewis; Jason Mohammed; Sunil Narine; Kjorn Ottley; Khary Pierre; Jayden Seales; Tion Webster	Andre Fletcher (C); Alick Athanaze (vc); Sunil Ambris; Johnson Charles; Darel Cyrus; Kenneth Dember; Shadrack Descarte; Larry Edward; Kavem Hodge; Ryan John; Shermon Lewis; Jeremy Solozano; Shamar Springer; Tevyn Walcott	Shane Dowrich (C); Johann Jeremiah; Shatrughan Rambaran; Shaqkere Parris; Demario Richards; Jordan Johnson; Akshaya Persad; Kirstan Kallicharan; Romario Greaves; Abhijai Mansingh; Chemar Holder; Isai Thorne; Kadeem Alleyne; Jediah Blades	Nyeem Young (C); Ackeem Auguste; Joshua Bishop; Teddy Bishop; Carlon Bowen-Tuckett; McKenny Clarke; Matthew Forde; Leonardo Julien; Johann Layne; Kimani Melius; Matthew Nandu; Ashmead Nedd; Kelvin Pitman; Kevin Wickham

== Points table ==
Pos	Team	Pld	W	L	NR	Pts	NRR
1	Trinidad and Tobago	7	5	0	2	49	0.945
2	Leeward Islands	7	4	2	1	44	1.159
3	Barbados	7	3	3	1	37	-0.067
4	Guyana	7	4	2	1	34	-0.307
5	West Indies Academy	7	3	2	2	33	0.256
6	Combined Campuses and Colleges	7	2	2	3	29	0.242
7	Windward Islands	7	1	5	1	19	-0.391
8	Jamaica	7	0	6	1	7	-1.783

Updated to match(es) played on 5 November 2023. Source: Cricinfo

Advance to the Semi-finals

=== Match summary ===
The total team points at the end of each round are listed.

Team	Round							Total
Team	1	2	3	4	5	6	7	Total
Trinidad and Tobago	4	12	22	30	37	40	49	49
Leeward Islands	13	21	23	25	35	42	44	44
Barbados	8	11	22	24	36	37	37	37
Guyana	7	7	13	15	23	25	34	34
West Indies Academy	9	12	14	22	23	31	33	33
Combined Campuses and Colleges	2	4	11	16	26	27	29	29
Windward Islands	1	2	5	6	16	17	19	19
Jamaica	0	1	2	3	5	7	7	7

Win	Loss	Tie	No Result

== Fixtures ==
17 October 2023
09:00
Scorecard

Trinidad and Tobago; 246/4 (44 overs)	v	Combined Campuses & Colleges; 53/0 (6.4 overs)
Darren Bravo 81* (84); Romario Greaves 1/35 (10 overs)		Kadeem Alleyne 27* (17)

No result
Queen's Park Oval, Port of Spain
Umpires: Jacqueline Williams & Leslie Reifer

- Combined Campuses and Colleges elected to field first.
- Isai Thorne, Jordan Johnson, Shatrughan Rambaran & Shaqkere Parris (Combined Campuses and Colleges) made their List A debut.
- Points: Trinidad & Tobago 4, Combined Campuses and Colleges 2

17 October 2023
13:00 (D/N)
Scorecard

Guyana; 229/9 (50 overs)	v	Windward Islands; 219 (46 overs)
Kevin Sinclair 41 (48); Ryan John 4/60 (10 overs)		Alick Athanaze 75 (55); Romario Shepherd 3/35 (8 overs)

Guyana won by 10 runs
Brian Lara Stadium, Tarouba
Umpires: Patrick Gustard and Zahid Bassarath
Player of the match: Kevin Sinclair (Guyana)

- Windward Islands elected to field first
- Points: Guyana 7, Windward Islands 1

18 October 2023
13:00 (D/N)
Scorecard

Jamaica; 123 (32.5 overs)	v	Leeward Islands; 124/2 (14 overs)
Odean Smith 26 (30); Daniel Doram 7/29 (9.5 overs)		Kieran Powell 80* (36); Fabian Allen 1/33 (4 overs)

Leeward Islands won by 8 wickets
Brian Lara Stadium, Tarouba
Umpires: Gregory Brathwaite and Leslie Reifer
Player of the match: Daniel Doram (Leeward Island)

- Leeward Islands, elected to field first
- Points: Leeward Islands 13, Jamaica 0

19 October 2023
13:00 (D/N)
Scorecard

Windward Islands; 254/9 (50 overs)	v	Trinidad and Tobago; 255/4 (48 overs)
Johnson Charles 87 (69); Yannic Cariah 4/57 (10 overs)		Kjorn Ottley 134* (142); Kenneth Dember 2/23 (10 overs)

Trinidad and Tobago won by 6 wickets
Queen's Park Oval, Port of Spain
Umpires: Chris Wright and Leslie Reifer
Player of the match: Kjorn Ottley (Trinidad and Tobago)

- Trinidad and Tobago elected to field first.
- Points: Trinidad & Tobago 8, Windward Islands 1

19 October 2023
13:00 (D/N)
Scorecard

West Indies Academy; 318/8 (50 overs)	v	Combined Campuses and Colleges; 289 (49 overs)
Teddy Bishop 95* (75); Isai Thorne 3/65 (10 overs)		Johann Jeremiah 82 (65); Nyeem Young 3/80 (9 overs)

West Indies Academy won by 29 runs
Brian Lara Stadium, Tarouba
Umpires: Deighton Butler and Jacqueline Williams
Player of the match: Teddy Bishop (West Indies Academy)

- Combined Campuses & Colleges elected to field first.
- Mathew Nandu (Academy) made his List A debut.
- Points: West Indies Academy 9, Combined Campuses and Colleges 2

20 October 2023
9:00
Scorecard

Barbados; 258/6 (50 overs)	v	Jamaica; 211 (44.3 overs)
Shamarh Brooks 69 (89); Nicholson Gordon 2/41 (7 overs)		Chadwick Walton 94 (112); Javed Leacock 4/43 (8 overs)

Barbados won by 47 runs
Sir Frank Worrell Memorial Ground, St Augustine
Umpires: Deighton Butler and Patrick Gustard
Player of the match: Javed Leacock (Barbados)

- Jamaica elected to field first.
- Shalome Parnell (Jamaica) and Jair McAllister (Barbados) made their List A debut.
- Points: Barbados 8, Jamaica 1

21 October 2023
9:00
Scorecard

Leeward Islands; 239 (48.5 overs)	v	West Indies Academy; 173 (40 overs)
Hayden Walsh Jr. 60* (55); Joshua Bishop 4/27 (10 overs)		Kimani Melius 37 (53); Hayden Walsh Jr. 5/48 (9 overs)

Leeward Islands won by 66 runs
Queen's Park Oval, Port of Spain
Umpires: Candace la Borde and Nigel Duguid
Player of the match: Hayden Walsh Jr. (Leeward Islands)

- West Indies Academy elected to field first.
- Points: Leeward Islands 8, West Indies Academy 3

21 October 2023
13:00 (D/N)
Scorecard

Trinidad and Tobago; 290/8 (50 overs)	v	Guyana; 176 (33.4 overs)
Yannic Cariah 71* (48); Romario Shepherd 2/43 (10 overs)		Sherfane Rutherford 30 (28); Yannic Cariah 5/34 (6 overs)

Trinidad and Tobago won by 114 runs
Brian Lara Stadium, Tarouba
Umpires: Carl Tuckett and Leslie Reifer
Player of the match: Yannic Cariah (Trinidad and Tobago)

- Guyana elected to field first.
- Quentin Sampson (Guyana) made his List A debut.
- Points: Trinidad & Tobago 10, Guyana 0

22 October 2023
9:00
Scorecard

Windward Islands; 267/8 (50 overs)	v	Combined Campuses and Colleges; 271/8 (50 overs)
Alick Athanaze 65 (68); Abhijai Mansingh 2/46 (10 overs)		Shane Dowrich 102* (101); Darel Cyrus 4/54 (10 overs)

Combined Campuses & Colleges won by 2 wickets
Sir Frank Worrell Memorial Ground, St Augustine
Umpires: Carl Tuckett and Patrick Gustard
Player of the match: Shane Dowrich (Combined Campuses & Colleges)

- Combined Campuses & Colleges elected to field first.
- Jediah Blades (CC&C) made his List A debut.
- Points: Combined Campuses and Colleges 7, Windward Islands 3

23 October 2023
9:00
Scorecard

Leeward Islands; 244/6 (50 overs)	v	Guyana; 248/6 (47.3 overs)
Jahmar Hamilton 54* (52); Veerasammy Permaul 2/40 (10 overs)		Sherfane Rutherford 105* (71); Kofi James 3/30 (10 overs)

Guyana won by 4 wickets
Queen's Park Oval, Port of Spain
Umpires: Gregory Brathwaite and Zahid Bassarath
Player of the match: Sherfane Rutherford (Guyana)

- Leeward Islands elected to bat first.
- Points: Guyana 6, Leeward Islands 2

23 October 2023
9:00
Scorecard

West Indies Academy; 141/6 (38.1 overs)	v	Barbados
Nyeem Young 67* (89); Dominic Drakes 2/10 (5 overs)

No Result
Sir Frank Worrell Memorial Ground, St Augustine
Umpires: Deighton Butler and Patrick Gustard

- Barbados elected to field first.
- Points: West Indies Academy 2, Barbados 3

25 October 2023
9:00
Scorecard

Windward Islands; 241/8 (50 overs)	v	Barbados; 148/2 (14.5 overs)
Johnson Charles 59 (48); Jomel Warrican 2/24 (10 overs)		Kyle Mayers 107* (52); Darel Cyrus 1/23 (3 overs)

Barbados won by 8 wickets
Brian Lara Stadium, Tarouba
Umpires: Carl Tuckett and Nigel Duguid
Player of the match: Kyle Mayers (Barbados)

- Barbados elected to field first.
- Points: Barbados 11, Windward Islands 1

25 October 2023
9:00
Scorecard

Jamaica; 263/9 (50 overs)	v	West Indies Academy; 227/4 (37.3 overs)
Kirk McKenzie 84 (102); Nyeem Young 5/49 (8 overs)		Teddy Bishop 67* (67); Shalome Parnell 2/43 (8 overs)

West Indies Academy won by 6 wickets
Queen's Park Oval, Port of Spain
Umpires: Gregory Brathwaite and Jacqueline Williams
Player of the match: Nyeem Young (West Indies Academy)

- Jamaica elected to bat first.
- Points: West Indies Academy 8, Jamaica 1

25 October 2023
9:00
Scorecard

Guyana; 177 (48.1 overs)	v	Combined Campuses and Colleges; 86/5 (15 overs)
Tevin Imlach 80 (105); Akshaya Persaud 2/23 (9 overs)		Kadeem Alleyne 47 (27); Kevin Sinclair 3/39 (6 overs)

No Results
Sir Frank Worrell Memorial Ground, St Augustine
Umpires: Chris Wright and Leslie Reifer

- Combined Campuses & Colleges elected to field first.
- Points: Guyana 2, Combined Campuses and Colleges 5

26 October 2023
13:00 (D/N)
Scorecard

Leeward Islands; 198 (37.2 overs)	v	Trinidad and Tobago; 199/7 (45.4 overs)
Kieran Powell 75 (48); Yannic Cariah 5/48 (10 overs)		Yannic Cariah 45* (102); Hayden Walsh Jr. 3/32 (9 overs)

Trinidad and Tobago won by 3 wickets
Brian Lara Stadium, Tarouba
Umpires: Deighton Butler and Patrick Gustard
Player of the match: Yannic Cariah (Trinidad and Tobago)

- Trinidad and Tobago elected to field first.
- Points: Trinidad & Tobago 8, Leeward Islands 2

27 October 2023
9:00
Scorecard

Combined Campuses and Colleges; 320/7 (48 overs)	v	Jamaica; 198 (32.4 overs)
Demario Richards 71 (82); Odean Smith 3/28 (8 overs)		Chadwick Walton 50 (35); Romario Greaves 4/51 (10 overs)

Combined Campuses & Colleges won by 121 runs (DLS)
Queen's Park Oval, Port of Spain
Umpires: Carl Tuckett and Jacqueline Williams
Player of the match: Romario Greaves (Combined Campuses & Colleges)

- Jamaica elected to field first.
- Points: Combined Campuses and Colleges 10, Jamaica 1

28 October 2023
9:00
Scorecard

West Indies Academy; 263/8 (50 overs)	v	Trinidad and Tobago; 264/6 (48.4 overs)
Ackeem Auguste 76* (63); Sunil Narine 2/33 (10 overs)		Jason Mohammed 70* (86); Kevin Wickham 2/54 (10 overs)

Trinidad and Tobago won by 4 wickets
Queen's Park Oval, Port of Spain
Umpires: Chris Wright and Nigel Duguid
Player of the match: Jason Mohammed (Trinidad and Tobago)

- West Indies Academy elected to bat first.
- Points: Trinidad & Tobago 7, West Indies Academy 1

29 October 2023
9:00
Scorecard

Guyana; 202 (46.3 overs)	v	Barbados; 146 (39.5 overs)
Sherfane Rutherford 74 (70); Javed Leacock 3/30 (6.3 overs)		Kyle Mayers 64 (63); Gudakesh Motie 5/17 (9.5 overs)

Guyana won by 56 runs
Sir Frank Worrell Memorial Ground, St Augustine
Umpires: Deighton Butler and Jacqueline Williams
Player of the match: Sherfane Rutherford (Guyana)

- Barbados elected to field first.
- Kemar Smith (Barbados) and Shamar Joseph (Guyana) made their List A debut.
- Points: Guyana 8, Barbados 2

29 October 2023
13:00 (D/N)
Scorecard

Jamaica; 158 (42.2 overs)	v	Windward Islands; 159/6 (36.2 overs)
Nkrumah Bonner 72 (110); Darel Cyrus 3/40 (10 overs)		Jeremy Solozano 40 (75); Jeavor Royal 1/28 (10 overs)

Windward Islands won by 4 wickets
Brian Lara Stadium, Tarouba
Umpires: Gregory Brathwaite and Zahid Bassarath
Player of the match: Shermon Lewis (Windward Islands)

- Windward Islands elected to field first.
- Points: Windward Islands 10, Jamaica 2

31 October 2023
13:00 (D/N)
Scorecard

Leeward Islands; 293 (50 overs)	v	Windward Islands; 179 (42.3 overs)
Justin Greaves 121 (126); Shermon Lewis 3/68 (7 overs)		Shamar Springer 58 (69); Hayden Walsh Jr. 4/40 (6.3 overs)

Leeward Islands won by 114 runs
Queen's Park Oval, Port of Spain
Umpires: Gregory Brathwaite and Zahid Bassarath
Player of the match: Justin Greaves (Leeward Islands)

- Leeward Islands elected to bat first.
- Points: Leeward Islands 10, Windward Islands 1

31 October 2023
9:00
Scorecard

Barbados; 314/7 (50 overs)	v	Combined Campuses and Colleges; 266 (45.2 overs)
Zachary McCaskie 131 (116); Jediah Blades 2/55 (8 overs)		Shane Dowrich 86 (84); Roston Chase 3/56 (10 overs)

Barbados won by 48 runs
Sir Frank Worrell Memorial Ground, St Augustine
Umpires: Carl Tuckett and Nigel Duguid
Player of the match: Zachary McCaskie (Barbados)

- Barbados elected to bat first.
- Points: Barbados 12, Combined Campuses and Colleges 1

1 November 2023
9:00
Scorecard

West Indies Academy; 263 (50 overs)	v	Guyana; 171 (35.1 overs)
Matthew Forde 52 (55); Kevin Sinclair 2/55 (8 overs)		Kevin Sinclair 46 (56); Ackeem Auguste 4/47 (9 overs)

West Indies Academy won by 92 runs
Sir Frank Worrell Memorial Ground, St Augustine
Umpires: Candace la Borde and Patrick Gustard
Player of the match: Nyeem Young (West Indies Academy)

- West Indies Academy elected to bat first.
- Points: West Indies Academy 8, Guyana 2

2 November 2023
9:00
Scorecard

Jamaica; 213/9 (48 overs)	v	Trinidad and Tobago
Nkrumah Bonner 74 (104); Sunil Narine 3/30 (10 overs)

No Result
Queen's Park Oval, Port of Spain
Umpires: Gregory Brathwaite and Nigel Duguid

- Trinidad and Tobago elected to field first.
- Points: Jamaica 2, Trinidad & Tobago 3

2 November 2023
13:00 (D/N)
Scorecard

Barbados; 196 (41.2 overs)	v	Leeward Islands; 192/6 (40.1 overs)
Shai Hope 55 (76); Alzarri Joseph 3/34 (9 overs)		Justin Greaves 95* (120); Roston Chase 4/34 (9 overs)

Leeward Islands won by 4 wickets
Brian Lara Stadium, Tarouba
Umpires: Chris Wright and Jacqueline Williams
Player of the match: Justin Greaves (Leeward Islands)

- Leeward Islands elected to field first.
- Points: Leeward Islands 7, Barbados 1

3 November 2023
9:00
Scorecard

West Indies Academy	v	Windward Islands

No Result
Sir Frank Worrell Memorial Ground, St Augustine

- Match abandoned without a ball bowled
- Points: West Indies Academy 2, Windward Islands 2

4 November 2023
9:00
Scorecard

Combined Campuses and Colleges	v	Leeward Islands

No Result
Queen's Park Oval, Port of Spain

- Match abandoned without a ball bowled
- Points: Combined Campuses and Colleges 2, Leeward Islands 2

4 November 2023
13:00 (D/N)
Scorecard

Jamaica; 181 (46.5 overs)	v	Guyana; 184/3 (39 overs)
Brad Barnes 36 (53); Nial Smith 3/26 (8.5 overs)		Tagenarine Chanderpaul 77 (110); Shalome Parnell 2/26 (6 overs)

Guyana won by 7 wickets
Brian Lara Stadium, Tarouba
Umpires: Carl Tuckett and Leslie Reifer
Player of the match: Tagenarine Chanderpaul (Guyana)

- Jamaica elected to bat first.
- Richie Looknauth (Guyana) made his List A debut
- Points: Guyana 9, Jamaica 0

5 November 2023
13:00 (D/N)
Scorecard

Trinidad and Tobago; 293/6 (50 overs)	v	Barbados; 215 (34.2 overs)
Darren Bravo 139* (113); Roston Chase 3/50 (10 overs)		Roston Chase 48 (46); Sunil Narine 4/13 (10 overs)

Trinidad and Tobago won by 78 runs
Brian Lara Stadium, Tarouba
Umpires: Chris Wright and Deighton Butler
Player of the match: Tagenarine Chanderpaul (Guyana)

- Barbados elected to field first.
- Points: Trinidad & Tobago 9, Barbados 0

== Knockout stage ==
Semi-finals
1	Trinidad and Tobago	107/4 (27.4)
4	Guyana	105 (34.3)
2	Leeward Islands	290 (49.4)
3	Barbados	135 (30.2)

Final
SFW1	Trinidad and Tobago	141/3 (23.4)
SFW2	Leeward Islands	135 (41.5)

=== Semi-finals ===
8 November 2023
13:00 (D/N)
Scorecard

Guyana; 105 (34.3 overs)	v	Trinidad and Tobago; 107/4 (27.4 overs)
Sherfane Rutherford 30 (52); Terrance Hinds 4/15 (4 overs)		Darren Bravo 53* (70); Gudakesh Motie 3/20 (7 overs)

Trinidad and Tobago won by 6 wickets
Brian Lara Stadium, Tarouba
Umpires: Leslie Reifer and Patrick Gustard
Player of the match: Terrance Hinds (Trinidad and Tobago)

- Trinidad and Tobago elected to field first.

9 November 2023
13:00 (D/N)
Scorecard

Leeward Islands; 290 (49.4 overs)	v	Barbados; 135 (30.2 overs)
Jahmar Hamilton 76 (61); Kemar Smith 5/43 (10 overs)		Roston Chase 35 (36); Daniel Doram 3/33 (10 overs)

Leeward Islands won by 155 runs
Brian Lara Stadium, Tarouba
Umpires: Deighton Butler and Nigel Duguid
Player of the match: Jahmar Hamilton (Leeward Islands)

- Leeward Islands elected to bat first.

=== Final ===
11 November 2023
13:00 (D/N)
Scorecard

Leeward Islands; 135 (41.5 overs)	v	Trinidad and Tobago; 141/3 (23.4 overs)
Jahmar Hamilton 62 (102); Sunil Narine 3/17 (9 overs)		Darren Bravo 40 (35); Hayden Walsh Jr. 2/19 (4 overs)

Trinidad and Tobago won by 7 wickets
Brian Lara Stadium, Tarouba
Umpires: Nigel Duguid and Patrick Gustard
Player of the match: Sunil Narine (Trinidad and Tobago)

- Leeward Islands won the toss and elected to bat.
