= Emerging Ireland cricket tour of the West Indies in 2023–24 =

International cricket tour

Emerging Ireland cricket team in West Indies in 2023-24
| | West Indies Academy | Emerging Ireland |
- Dates: 17 November – 5 December 2023
| Captains | Nyeem Young | Stephen Doheny |

FC series
- Result: West Indies Academy won the 2-match series 2–0
| Most runs | Kevlon Anderson (208) | Cade Carmichael (114) |
| Most wickets | Isai Thorne (12) | Thomas Mayes (10) |
- Player of the series: Joshua Bishop (West Indies Academy)

LA series
- Result: West Indies Academy won the 3-match series 2–1
| Most runs | Matthew Nandu (131) | Murray Commins (138) |
| Most wickets | Joshua Bishop (10) | Scott MacBeth (4) |
- Player of the series: Joshua Bishop (West Indies Academy)

The Emerging Ireland toured West Indies in November and December 2023 to play the West Indies Academy. The tour consisted of three List A and two first-class matches.

West Indies Academy won the List A series 2–1 beating Emerging Ireland by 6 wickets in last game.

West Indies Academy outplayed the Emerging Ireland to sweep the first-class series 2–0.

== Squads ==
| (Cricket West Indies) West Indies Academy | | Emerging Ireland |
| List A | First-class | List A & First-class |
|---|---|---|
| Nyeem Young (c); Ackeem Auguste; Joshua Bishop; Teddy Bishop; Carlon Bowen-Tuckett; McKenny Clarke; Jordan Johnson; Leonardo Julien; Johann Layne; Matthew Nandu; Ashmead Nedd; Kelvin Pitman; Junior Sinclair; Kevin Wickham; Kadeem Alleyne | Nyeem Young (c); Ackeem Auguste; Kevlon Anderson; Joshua Bishop; Teddy Bishop; Carlon Bowen-Tuckett; McKenny Clarke; Jordan Johnson; Leonardo Julien; Johann Layne; Matthew Nandu; Ashmead Nedd; Kelvin Pitman; Junior Sinclair; Kevin Wickham; Isai Thorne | Stephen Doheny (c); Cade Carmichael; Murray Commins; Matthew Foster; Mike Frost; Fionn Hand; Gavin Hoey; Matthew Humphreys; Scott Macbeth; Thomas Mayes; Liam McCarthy; James McCollum; Tim Tector; Morgan Topping |

== List A series ==
=== 1st Unofficial ODI ===
17 November 2023
09:00
Scorecard

| Emerging Ireland; 245 (49.1 overs) | v | (Cricket West Indies) West Indies Academy; 219 (41.4 overs) |
| Murray Commins 118* (127); Joshua Bishop 4/45 (10 overs) | | Matthew Nandu 59 (99); Scott MacBeth 3/33 (9 overs) |

Emerging Ireland won by 26 runs
Sir Vivian Richards Stadium, North Sound, Antigua
Umpires: Ryan Banwarie (WI) and Christopher Taylor (WI)
Player of the match: Murray Commins (Emerging Ireland)

- Emerging Ireland won the toss and elected to bat.
- Junior Sinclair (West Indies Academy) made his List A debut.

=== 2nd Unofficial ODI ===
19 November 2023
09:00
Scorecard

| Emerging Ireland; 103 (27.3 overs) | v | (Cricket West Indies) West Indies Academy; 107/3 (15.4 overs) |
| Scott MacBeth 29 (36); Joshua Bishop 3/19 (6.3 overs) | | Jordan Johnson 40* (21); Fionn Hand 2/29 (4 overs) |

West Indies Academy won by 7 wickets
Coolidge Cricket Ground, Antigua
Umpires: Ryan Banwarie (WI) and Jonathan Blades (WI)
Player of the match: Jordan Johnson (West Indies Academy)

- West Indies Academy won the toss and elected to field.

=== 3rd Unofficial ODI ===
21 November 2023
09:00
Scorecard

| Emerging Ireland; 175 (43.4 overs) | v | (Cricket West Indies) West Indies Academy; 179/4 (40.3 overs) |
| Stephen Doheny 64 (95); Ashmead Nedd 3/28 (9 overs) | | Nyeem Young 75* (65); Matthew Humphreys 2/52 (9.3 overs) |

West Indies Academy won by 6 wickets
Sir Vivian Richards Stadium, North Sound, Antigua
Umpires: Jonathan Blades (WI) and Christopher Taylor (WI)
Player of the match: Nyeem Young (West Indies Academy)

- West Indies Academy won the toss and elected to field.

== First-class series ==
=== 1st Unofficial Test ===
25–28 November 2023
Scorecard

| Emerging Ireland | v | (Cricket West Indies) West Indies Academy |
| 213 (61.4 overs); Murray Commins 93 (122); Isai Thorne 4/33 (9.4 overs) | | 409 (96.4 overs); Joshua Bishop 102* (70); Michael Frost 4/89 (17 overs) |
| 62 (32.4 overs); Stephen Doheny 17 (55); Isai Thorne 4/8 (6 overs) |

West Indies Academy won by an innings and 134 runs
Coolidge Cricket Ground, Antigua
Umpires: Ryan Banwarie (WI) and Christopher Taylor (WI)
Player of the match: Joshua Bishop (West Indies Academy)

- Cade Carmichael, Michael Frost, Gavin Hoey, Scott MacBeth, Morgan Topping (Emerging Ireland), Isai Thorne and Carlon Bowen-Tuckett (West Indies Academy) all made their first-class debuts.
- Joshua Bishop (West Indies Academy) scored his maiden first-class century.

=== 2nd Unofficial Test ===
2–5 December 2023
Scorecard

| West Indies Academy (Cricket West Indies) | v | Emerging Ireland |
| 326 (96.5 overs); Kevlon Anderson 125 (207); Thomas Mayes 5/64 (24.5 overs) | | 72 (26.4 overs); Cade Carmichael 39 (56); Joshua Bishop 4/18 (6.4 overs) |
| 321/8d (71.2 overs); Kevin Wickham 105* (108); Thomas Mayes 5/75 (18.2 overs) | | 143 (37.5 overs); Liam McCarthy 35* (32); Joshua Bishop 4/36 (11 overs) |

West Indies Academy won by 432 runs
Coolidge Cricket Ground, Antigua
Umpires: Jonathan Blades (WI) and Maria Abbott (WI)
Player of the match: Kevlon Anderson (West Indies Academy)

- Emerging Ireland won the toss and elected to field.
- Liam McCarthy and Tim Tector (Emerging Ireland) both made their first-class debuts.
