= Sri Lanka Emerging cricket team in the West Indies in 2025 =

International cricket tour

	West Indies Academy	Sri Lanka Emerging
- Dates: 7 – 26 June 2025
Captains	Teddy Bishop	Dhananjaya Lakshan

FC series
- Result: 2-match series drawn 1–1
Most runs	Ackeem Auguste (173)	Sohan de Livera (201)
Most wickets	Kelvin Pitman (12); Nathan Edward (12)	Dulaj Samuditha (10)

LA series
- Result: West Indies Academy won the 3-match series 2–1
Most runs	Carlon Bowen-Tuckett (130)	Sahan Kosala (134)
Most wickets	Jediah Blades (6)	Garuka Sanketh (7)

The Sri Lanka Emerging cricket team toured West Indies in June 2025 to play against the West Indies Academy. The tour consisted of two first-class matches and three List A cricket matches.

== Squads ==
(Cricket West Indies) West Indies Academy	Sri Lanka Emerging
First-class & List A	First-class & List A
Teddy Bishop (c); Jewel Andrew; Ackeem Auguste; Joshua Bishop; Jediah Blades; McKenny Clarke; Rivaldo Clarke; Mavendra Dindyal; Nathan Edward; Jordan Johnson; Mbeki Joseph; Justin Jagessar; Micah McKenzie; Zishan Motara; Michael Palmer; Kelvin Pitman; Raneico Smith; Carlon Bowen-Tuckett (wk)	Dhananjaya Lakshan (c); Anjala Bandara; Ashian Daniel; Shevon Daniel; Sohan de Livera (wk); Sithum Dissanayaka; Nipun Dhananjaya; Ravindu Fernando; Melan Hansaka; Sahan Kosala; Traveen Mathew; Janishka Perera; Ravindu Rasantha; Dulaj Samuditha; Garuka Sanketh; Dilum Sudeera; Ahan Wickramasinghe; Chamindu Wijesinghe

== First-class series ==
=== 1st Unofficial Test ===
7–10 June 2025
Scorecard

Sri Lanka Emerging	v	West Indies Academy
292 (65.4 overs); Sohan de Livera 130 (110); Kelvin Pitman 7/28 (13 overs)		215 (50.4 overs); Rivaldo Clarke 42 (55); Dulaj Samuditha 5/57 (10 overs)
219 (58.2 overs); Ravindu Rasantha 65 (98); Nathan Edward 6/23 (14.2 overs)		222 (50.5 overs); Ackeem Auguste 82 (95); Dilum Sudeera 4/51 (14 overs)

Sri Lanka Emerging won by 75 runs
Coolidge Cricket Ground, Osbourn
Umpires: Deighton Butler (WI) and Deighton Butler (WI)

- West Indies Academy won the toss and elected to field.
- Raneico Smith (West Indies Academy) made his first-class debut.
- Kelvin Pitman and Nathan Edward (West Indies Academy) both took their maiden five-wicket haul in first-class cricket.
- Teddy Bishop (West Indies Academy) scored his 1,000th run in first-class cricket.

=== 2nd Unofficial Test ===
14–17 June 2025
Scorecard

Sri Lanka Emerging	v	West Indies Academy
241 (60.1 overs); Anjala Bandara 56* (104); Joshua Bishop 3/68 (16.1 overs)		374 (99.3 overs); Mavendra Dindyal 82 (158); Dilum Sudeera 4/79 (27 overs)
107 (25.1 overs); Dhananjaya Lakshan 50 (34); Kelvin Pitman 3/22 (7 over)

West Indies Academy won by an innings and 26 runs
Coolidge Cricket Ground, Osbourn
Umpires: Afron Byam (WI) and Joel Wilson (WI)

- Sri Lanka Emerging won the toss and elected to bat.
- Joshua Bishop (West Indies Academy) took his 100th wicket in first-class cricket.
- Ackeem Auguste (West Indies Academy) scored his 1,000th run in first class cricket.

== List A series ==
=== 1st Unofficial ODI ===
21 June 2025
09:30
Scorecard

West Indies Academy; 237 (46.2 overs)	v	Sri Lanka Emerging; 238/5 (39.4 overs)
Ackeem Auguste 66 (75); Traveen Mathew 3/40 (10 overs)		Ahan Wickramasinghe 103 (79); Nathan Edward 2/44 (7.2 overs)

Sri Lanka Emerging won by 5 wickets
Sir Vivian Richards Stadium, North Sound, Antigua
Umpires: Stephen Proverbs (WI) and Joel Wilson (WI)

- West Academy won the toss and elected to bat.
- Micah McKenzie (West Indies Academy) made his List A debut.

=== 2nd Unofficial ODI ===
24 June 2025
09:30
Scorecard

West Indies Academy; 290/9 (50 overs)	v	Sri Lanka Emerging; 271 (48.2 overs)
Rivaldo Clarke 74 (74); Garuka Sanketh 4/63 (10 overs)		Sahan Kosala 75 (87); Micah McKenzie 3/70 (10 overs)

West Indies Academy won by 19 runs
Sir Vivian Richards Stadium, North Sound, Antigua
Umpires: Afron Byam (WI) and Joel Wilson (WI)

- Sri Lanka Emerging won the toss and elected to field.
- Mavendra Dindyal (West Indies Academy) and Melan Hasanka (Sri Lanka Emerging) both made their List A debuts.

=== 3rd Unofficial ODI ===
26 June 2025
09:30
Scorecard

Sri Lanka Emerging; 144 (35.5 overs)	v	West Indies Academy; 147/3 (24.1 overs)
Sahan Kosala 40 (52); Jediah Blades 5/28 (8 overs)		Jewel Andrew 38 (24); Melan Hasanka 2/57 (9.1 overs)

West Indies Academy won by 7 wickets
Sir Vivian Richards Stadium, North Sound, Antigua
Umpires: Stephen Proverbs (WI) and Joel Wilson (WI)

- Sri Lanka Emerging won the toss and elected to bat.
- Jediah Blades (West Indies Academy) took his maiden five-wicket haul in List A cricket.
