= 2023 Headley Weekes Tri-Series =

Cricket tournament

- Date: 19 April–6 May 2023
- Location: Antigua and Barbuda
Teams
Team Headley	Team Weekes	West Indies Academy
Captains
Joshua Da Silva	Alick Athanaze	Nyeem Young
Most runs
Most wickets

2023 Headley Weekes Tri-Series is the inaugural season of the Headley Weekes Tri-Series, a domestic first-class cricket competition organized by Cricket West Indies (CWI) and named in honour of West Indian cricketers George Headley and Everton Weekes. It took place from 19 April to 6 May 2023. It is a tri-series between Team Headley, Team Weekes and West Indies Academy, with the matches being played as first-class fixtures. Team Headley and Team Weekes were composed of players who were the leading performers in the 2022–23 West Indies Championship and those deemed to be on the fringe of the Test team; with CWI and the selectors aiming to provide further first-class cricketing opportunities for the benefit of these two sets of players. All three matches were played at Coolidge Cricket Ground, Antigua. The tournament was used as preparation ahead of West Indies A's tour to Bangladesh and Test series against India at home.

The West Indies Academy team were the winners of the tournament on net run rate after beating Team Headley and triumphing on first innings against Team Weekes.

== Squads ==
The following squads were named for the tri-series:

Team Headley	Team Weekes	West Indies Academy
Joshua Da Silva (c); Sunil Ambris; Darren Bravo; Justin Greaves; Kavem Hodge; Chaim Holder; Akeem Jordan; Marquino Mindley; Shayne Moseley; Gudakesh Motie; Anderson Phillip; Kieran Powell; Tevyn Walcott	Alick Athanaze (c); Tagenarine Chanderpaul; Keacy Carty; Dominic Drakes; Jahmar Hamilton; Brandon King; Jair McAllister; Zachary McCaskie; Veerasammy Permaul; Raymon Reifer; Kevin Sinclair; Nial Smith; Devon Thomas	Nyeem Young (c); Kevlon Anderson; Ackeem Auguste; Joshua Bishop; Teddy Bishop; McKenny Clarke; ~~Rivaldo Clarke~~; Joshua James; Tevin Imlach; Johann Layne; Kirk McKenzie; Ashmead Nedd; Kelvin Pitman; Keagan Simmons; Ramon Simmonds; Kevin Wickham

On 18 April 2023, Rivaldo Clarke was replaced in the squad by Tevin Imlach.

== Fixtures ==
19–22 April 2023
Scorecard

Team Headley	v	West Indies Academy
259 (70.4 overs); Joshua Da Silva 136* (201); Johann Layne 5/43 (11 overs)		323 (94 overs); Kevlon Anderson 153 (283); Justin Greaves 3/46 (20 overs)
122 (49 overs); Justin Greaves 30* (90); Nyeem Young 3/17 (10 overs)		59/3 (19.4 overs); Keagan Simmons 31* (57); Chaim Holder 3/22 (8 overs)

West Indies Academy won by 7 wickets
Coolidge Cricket Ground, Antigua
Umpires: Gregory Brathwaite and Zahid Bassarath

- Team Headley won the toss and elected to bat.
- Ashmead Nedd, Joshua Bishop, Johann Layne, Kelvin Pitman and Nyeem Young (West Indies Academy) all made their first-class debuts.
- Johann Layne took his first five-wicket haul in first-class cricket.
- Kevlon Anderson (West Indies Academy) scored his first century in first-class cricket.

26–29 April 2023
Scorecard

Team Weekes	v	West Indies Academy
401 (99.2 overs); Zachary McCaskie 93 (147); Nyeem Young 3/91 (27 overs)		435 (142.5 overs); Kirk McKenzie 221 (386); Kevin Wickham 121 (270); Jair McAllister 4/84 (20 overs)
107/3 (41 overs); Tagenarine Chanderpaul 53 (117); Joshua Bishop 2/2 (4 overs)

Match drawn
Coolidge Cricket Ground, Antigua
Umpires: Leslie Reifer and Nigel Duguid

- West Indies Academy won the toss and elected to field.

3–5 May 2023
Scorecard

Team Headley	v	Team Weekes
177 (65.2 overs); Kavem Hodge 67 (151); Veerasammy Permaul 3/16 (14.2 overs)		235 (80.3 overs); Devon Thomas 57 (150); Kavem Hodge 3/46 (18 overs)
153 (63.1 overs); Matthew Nandu 36 (129); Kevin Sinclair 5/48 (21 overs)		96/2 (26.5 overs); Tagenarine Chanderpaul 33 (50); Zachary McCaskie 33 (59); Justin Greaves 1/13 (3 overs)

Team Weekes won by 8 wickets
Coolidge Cricket Ground, Antigua
Umpires: Gregory Brathwaite and Leslie Reifer

- Team Headley won the toss and elected to bat.
