= 2022–23 Super50 Cup =

Cricket tournament

2022–23 Regional Super50
- Dates: 29 October 2022 – 19 November 2022
- Administrator: CWI
- Cricket format: List A (50 overs)
- Tournament format(s): Group stage, finals
- Champions: Jamaica (9th title)
- Participants: 8
- Matches: 27
- Most runs: Rovman Powell (346)
- Most wickets: Shannon Gabriel (15); Odean Smith (15); Nicholson Gordon (15)

The 2022–23 Super50 Cup was a cricket tournament; it was the 48th edition of the Super50 Cup, the domestic limited-overs cricket competition for the countries of the Cricket West Indies (CWI). The tournament took place in October and November 2022 in Trinidad and Tobago.

The tournament consisted of eight teams: Barbados, Guyana, Jamaica, the Leeward Islands, Trinidad and Tobago, the Windward Islands, the Combined Campuses and Colleges, and a West Indies Academy. The previous edition, which took place in February 2021, was won by Trinidad and Tobago. The teams were split into 2 groups, with defending champions and hosts Trinidad and Tobago, Guyana, the Windward Islands and Combined Campuses and Colleges in Zone A, while Barbados, Jamaica, the Leeward Islands and West Indies Emerging Team were in Zone B.

== Squads ==
Barbados	Guyana	Jamaica	Leeward Islands	Trinidad and Tobago	Windward Islands	Combined Campuses and Colleges	West Indies Academy
Shai Hope (c); Camarie Boyce; Kraigg Brathwaite; Jonathan Carter; Roston Chase; Akeem Jordan; Nicholas Kirton; Javed Leacock; Jair McAllister; Zachary McCaskie; Roshon Primus; Ramon Simmonds; Shamar Springer; Jomel Warrican; Shane Dowrich	Leon Johnson (c); Shimron Hetmyer; Anthony Bramble; Tagenarine Chanderpaul; Sherfane Rutherford; Tevin Imlach; Quinton Sampson; Clinton Pestano; Gudakesh Motie; Veerasammy Permaul; Kemol Savory; Romario Shepherd; Kevin Sinclair; Nial Smith	Jermaine Blackwood (c); Rovman Powell (vc); Aldaine Thomas; Brandon King; Marquino Mindley; Nicholson Gordon; Chadwick Walton; Jamie Merchant; Alwyn Williams; Nkrumah Bonner; Dennis Bulli; Andre McCarthy; Jeavor Royal; Pete Salmon; Odean Smith; Sheldon Cottrell	Jahmar Hamilton (c); Rahkeem Cornwall (vc); Kieran Powell; Devon Thomas; Keacy Carty; Karima Gore; Ross Powell; Terrence Warde; Colin Archibald; Jeremiah Louis; Sheno Berridge; Hayden Walsh; Kofi James; Damien Williams	Nicholas Pooran (c); Sunil Narine; Joshua Da Silva; Evin Lewis; Jason Mohammed; Jeremy Solozano; Darren Bravo; Shannon Gabriel; Yannic Cariah; Akeal Hosein; Imran Khan; Jayden Seales; Anderson Phillip; Kjorn Ottley; Jyd Goolie; Khary Pierre; Mark Deyal; Terrance Hinds	Andre Fletcher (c); Alick Athanaze (vc); Johann Jeremiah; Kavem Hodge; Sunil Ambris; Justin Greaves; Keron Cottoy; Tevyn Walcott; Ryan John; Shermon Lewis; Preston McSween; Larry Edward; Kenneth Dember; Darel Cyrus; Johnson Charles; Obed McCoy	Denesh Ramdin (c); Matthew Forde; Amari Goodridge; Abhijai Mansingh; Demario Richards; Isaiah Ali; Jonathan Drakes; Kirstan Kallicharan; Michail Powell; Nathan Edward; Navin Bidaisee; Odain McCatty; Romario Greaves; Zavier Burton	Kirk McKenzie (c); Keagan Simmons; Kevlon Anderson; Teddy Bishop; Kevin Wickham; Ackeem Auguste; McKenny Clarke; Johann Layne; Ashmead Nedd; Joshua Bishop; Nyeem Young; Joshua James; Leonardo Julien; Carlon Bowen-Tuckett

Several teams named 15-player squads, including replacements for players who would be departing the tournament to represent the West Indies team in their series in Australia in November. However, after the early exit of the West Indies team from the 2022 T20 World Cup, teams were allowed to name an extended 18-player squad for the opening few fixtures, with West Indian internationals who were previously expected to be unavailable now free to be picked.

== Points table ==
=== Zone A ===
Pos	Team	Pld	W	L	NR	Pts	NRR	Qualification
1	Trinidad and Tobago Red Force	6	4	1	1	18	1.021	Advanced to the knockout stage
2	Guyana Harpy Eagles	6	4	2	0	16	0.442	Advanced to the knockout stage
3	Windward Islands Volcanoes	6	3	3	0	12	0.265	
4	Combined Campuses and Colleges	6	0	5	1	2	−1.950	

Source: ESPNCricinfo, Cricket.com

=== Zone B ===
Pos	Team	Pld	W	L	NR	Pts	NRR	Qualification
1	Jamaica Scorpions	6	4	2	0	16	0.177	Advanced to the knockout stage
2	Barbados Pride	6	3	2	1	14	0.130	Advanced to the knockout stage
3	Leeward Islands Hurricanes	6	3	2	1	14	0.498	
4	West Indies Academy	6	1	5	0	4	−0.700	

Source: ESPNCricinfo, Cricket.com

== Fixtures ==
Fixture times are local time (UTC−4).

=== Zone A ===
31 October 2022
09:00
Scorecard

Windward Islands; 296/4 (50 overs)	v	Guyana; 268 (46.4 overs)
Alick Athanaze 133 (140); Gudakesh Motie 2/57 (10 overs)		Tagenarine Chanderpaul 48 (47); Sadrack Descarte 3/41 (8 overs)

Windward Islands won by 28 runs
Queen's Park Oval, Trinidad and Tobago
Umpires: Gregory Brathwaite and Chris Wright
Player of the match: Alick Athanaze (Windward Islands)

- Guyana won the toss and elected to field
- Sadrack Descarte made his List A debut
- Alick Athanaze scored his first List A century

31 October 2022
14:00
Scorecard

Combined Campuses and Colleges; 119 (33.3 overs)	v	Trinidad and Tobago; 120/3 (27.4 overs)
Jonathan Drakes 38 (40); Akeal Hosein 4/38 (8.3 overs)		Kjorn Ottley 65* (79); Zavier Burton 1/7 (2.4 overs)

Trinidad and Tobago won by 7 wickets
Brian Lara Cricket Academy, Trinidad and Tobago
Umpires: Jonathan Blades and Carl Tuckett
Player of the match: Akeal Hosein (Trinidad and Tobago)

- Trinidad and Tobago won the toss and elected to field
- Amari Goodridge, Demario Richards, Isiah Ali, Jyd Goolie, Matthew Forde, Nathan Edward, Romario Greaves and Zavier Burton (Combined Campuses and Colleges) all made their List A debuts

2 November 2022
09:00
Scorecard

Windward Islands; 300/4 (50 overs)	v	Combined Campuses and Colleges; 109/4 (23 overs)
Alick Athanaze 140 (130); Amari Goodridge 2/56 (7 overs)		Demario Richards 24 (18); Justin Greaves 1/21 (5 overs)

Windward Islands won by 50 runs (DLS method)
Queen's Park Oval, Trinidad and Tobago
Umpires: Carl Tuckett and Jacqueline Williams
Player of the match: Alick Athanaze (Windward Islands)

- Combined Campuses and Colleges won the toss and elected to field
- Combined Campuses and Colleges were set a revised target of 160 runs from 23 overs due to rain.

2 November 2022
14:00
Scorecard

Guyana; 269/9 (50 overs)	v	Trinidad and Tobago; 266/6 (50 overs)
Romario Shepherd 74 (46); Shannon Gabriel 4/42 (9 overs)		Darren Bravo 71 (88); Romario Shepherd 2/44 (10 overs)

Guyana won by 3 runs
Brian Lara Cricket Academy, Trinidad and Tobago
Umpires: Gregory Brathwaite and Christopher Taylor
Player of the match: Romario Shepherd (Guyana)

- Trinidad and Tobago won the toss and elected to field.

5 November 2022
09:00

Windward Islands; 189 (47 overs)	v	Trinidad and Tobago; 195/3 (43 overs)
Kavem Hodge 39 (72); Yannic Cariah 3/34 (10 overs)		Joshua Da Silva 66 (88); Kavem Hodge 1/25 (10 overs)

Trinidad and Tobago won by 7 wickets
Queen's Park Oval, Trinidad and Tobago
Umpires: Jonathan Blades and Jacqueline Williams
Player of the match: Joshua Da Silva (Trinidad and Tobago)

- Windward Islands won the toss and elected to bat.
- Terrance Hinds (Trinidad and Tobago) made his List-A debut.

5 November 2022
14:00

Combined Campuses and Colleges; 206 (48.3 overs)	v	Guyana; 207/5 (42.5 overs)
Denesh Ramdin 38 (58); Romario Shepherd 4/19 (7.3 overs)		Tevin Imlach 63* (100); Michail Powell 2/37 (6 overs)

Guyana won by 5 wickets
Brian Lara Cricket Academy, Trinidad and Tobago
Umpires: Christopher Taylor and Chris Wright
Player of the match: Romario Shepherd (Guyana)

- Guyana won the toss and elected to field.
- Navin Bidaisee (Combined Campuses and Colleges) made his List-A debut.

7 November 2022
09:00
Scorecard

Combined Campuses and Colleges; 200 (50 overs)	v	Trinidad and Tobago; 97/1 (18.5 overs)
Kirstan Kallicharan 37 (57); Imran Khan 4/53 (10 overs)		Kjorn Ottley 43* (60); Amari Goodridge 1/28 (4 overs)

No result
Queen's Park Oval, Trinidad and Tobago
Umpires: Gregory Brathwaite and Carl Tuckett

- Trinidad and Tobago won the toss and elected to field.
- Rain during Trinidad and Tobago's innings prevented any further play.
- Kyle Roopchand (Combined Campuses and Colleges) made his List-A debut.

7 November 2022
14:00

Windward Islands	v	Guyana

Brian Lara Cricket Academy, Trinidad and Tobago

9 November 2022
09:00

Trinidad and Tobago	v	Guyana

Queen's Park Oval, Trinidad and Tobago

9 November 2022
14:00

Combined Campuses and Colleges	v	Windward Islands

Brian Lara Cricket Academy, Trinidad and Tobago

12 November 2022
09:00

Guyana	v	Combined Campuses and Colleges

Queen's Park Oval, Trinidad and Tobago

12 November 2022
14:00

Trinidad and Tobago	v	Windward Islands

Brian Lara Cricket Academy, Trinidad and Tobago

=== Zone B ===
29 October 2022
14:00
Scorecard

WI Emerging; 190-9 (50 overs)	v	Leeward Islands; 191-7 (39 overs)
Kevin Wickham 44 (47); Rahkeem Cornwall 4-42 (10)		Keacy Carty 103* (120); Joshua Bishop 4-40 (10)

Leeward Islands won by 3 wickets
Sir Vivian Richards Stadium, Antigua
Umpires: Leslie Reifer, Nigel Duguid
Player of the match: Keacy Carty (Leeward Islands)

- Leeward Islands won the toss and elected to field
- Ackeem Auguste, Johann Layne, Joshua James, Kevlon Anderson, Kevin Wickham, Kirk McKenzie and McKenny Clarke (All CWI Academy) made their List A debuts

1 November 2022
09:00

WI Emerging	v	Barbados

Coolidge Cricket Ground, Trinidad and Tobago

1 November 2022
14:00

Leeward Islands	v	Jamaica

Sir Vivian Richards Stadium, Trinidad and Tobago

3 November 2022
14:00

Barbados	v	Jamaica

Sir Vivian Richards Stadium, Trinidad and Tobago

5 November 2022
14:00

Jamaica	v	WI Emerging

Sir Vivian Richards Stadium, Trinidad and Tobago

6 November 2022
14:00

Leeward Islands	v	Barbados

Sir Vivian Richards Stadium, Trinidad and Tobago

- Barbados won the toss and elected to field

8 November 2022
14:00

Barbados	v	Jamaica

Sir Vivian Richards Stadium, Trinidad and Tobago

9 November 2022
14:00

Leeward Islands	v	WI Emerging

Sir Vivian Richards Stadium, Trinidad and Tobago

11 November 2022
09:00

Leeward Islands	v	Jamaica

Coolidge Cricket Ground, Trinidad and Tobago

11 November 2022
14:00

WI Emerging	v	Barbados

Sir Vivian Richards Stadium, Trinidad and Tobago

13 November 2022
14:00

Leeward Islands	v	Barbados

Sir Vivian Richards Stadium, Trinidad and Tobago

14 November 2022
14:00

Jamaica	v	WI Emerging

Sir Vivian Richards Stadium, Trinidad and Tobago

== Knockout stage ==
=== Semi-finals ===
16 November 2022
14:00

Trinidad and Tobago	v	Barbados

Trinidad and Tobago won by 10 runs
Sir Vivian Richards Stadium, Trinidad and Tobago

17 November 2022
14:00

Guyana	v	Jamaica

Jamaica won by 3 wickets
Sir Vivian Richards Stadium, Trinidad and Tobago

=== Final ===
19 November 2022
14:00

Trinidad and Tobago	v	Jamaica

Jamaica won by 3 wickets
Sir Vivian Richards Stadium, Trinidad and Tobago
