= Christopher De Freitas =

South African-Portuguese cricketer (born 2002)

Personal information
- Born: 6 February 2002 (age 24); Welkom, Free State, South Africa
- Batting: Left-handed
- Bowling: Right-arm medium
- Role: Batting all-rounder

International information
- National side: Portugal (2026–present)
- T20I debut (cap 43): 5 April 2026 v France
- Last T20I: 9 April 2026 v France
- T20I shirt no.: 7

Domestic team information
- Years: Team
- 2023–present: Leinster Lightning

Career statistics
Competition	T20I	FC	LA
Matches	6	4	29
Runs scored	267	176	1142
Batting average	44.50	25.14	49.65
100s/50s	1/2	0/1	2/8
Top score	125	88	143*
Catches/stumpings	2/–	1/–	16/–
- Source: Cricinfo, 11 August 2026

Christopher De Freitas (born 6 February 2002) is a South African-born Portuguese cricketer who plays for the Portugal national cricket team and plays for Leinster Lightning in Irish domestic cricket. He made his first-class debut for Emerging Ireland in the series against West Indies Academy on 18 June 2024.

== Early life and education ==
De Freitas was born on 6 February 2002 in Welkom in the Free State province. He attended Laerskool Saamtrek school in Klerksdorp and went on to complete his schooling at Hoër Volkskool Potchefstroom in Potchefstroom. Growing up in South Africa, he was introduced to the game as he played backyard cricket with his brother.

== Domestic career ==
In South Africa, he took part in age-group cricket during his schooling in North West province. He was part of the North West Under-13 squad during the 2015/16 CSA Under-13s Cricket Week, where he played as an all-rounder. During the 2017/18 National Under-15 Week he scored 211 runs, averaging at 35 from six games. Following this performance, he also played for the Lions Cubs team during the 2019-20 Franchise Cubs Week.

In 2021, De Freitas moved to Ireland and was signed by the Balbriggan Cricket Club. He was part of the club's winning run during a number of domestic tournaments. He attributes his growth to the Balbriggan coach and former international, Andre Botha and mentor Wynand Schmitt.

In 2023, he was part of the Leinster Lightning Bolts squad for the Cricket Ireland Future Series. He made his List A debut for Leinster Lightning on 14 August 2023 during the 2023 Inter-Provincial Cup. He finished the season with 120 runs from 3 matches including two half centuries. In the 2024 season, he was awarded the emerging player of the year.

He was part of the eventual champions Leinster's squad during the 2024 Inter-Provincial Trophy and made his Twenty20 (T20) debut on 16 May 2024. After a disappointing season, he made a comeback during the 2025 Inter-Provincial Trophy, finishing as the tournament's third-highest run-scorer with 368 runs in 12 matches and playing a crucial role in Leinster's title triumph. He was also part of the squad that won three back-to-back Inter-Provincial Trophy titles in 2026.

== International career ==
In June 2024, he was named in Emerging Ireland squad for their home series against West Indies Academy. He made his first-class debut on 18 June 2024. He scored 88 runs in the first innings and 26 runs in the second, finishing as the highest run-scorer for the team. In the unofficial ODI series, he finished as the second highest run-scorer with 147 runs in 3 matches including a half-century.

De Freitas had expressed his intention to play for Ireland, but later changed his plans to represent Portugal. He was named in Portugal's squad for the 2026 Portugal Tri-Nation Series and made his Twenty20 International (T20I) debut against France on 5 April 2026. In only his third T20I, he scored a century finishing with a score of 125 in just 54 deliveries, setting the record for the highest individual score by a Portugal player.

In August 2026, he was named in Portugal's squad for the 2026 Men's T20 World Cup Europe Sub-regional Qualifier C, which formed part of the qualification pathway for the 2028 Men's T20 World Cup.
