= 2021 Caribbean Premier League =

Ninth season of the Caribbean Premier League

- Dates: 26 August – 15 September 2021
- Administrator: CPL Limited
- Cricket format: Twenty20
- Tournament format(s): Group stage and knockout
- Host: Saint Kitts and Nevis
- Champions: St Kitts & Nevis Patriots (1st title)
- Runners-up: Saint Lucia Kings
- Participants: 6
- Matches: 33
- Player of the series: Roston Chase (Saint Lucia Kings)
- Most runs: Roston Chase (Saint Lucia Kings) (446)
- Most wickets: Ravi Rampaul (Trinbago Knight Riders) (19)
- Official website: cplt20.com

The 2021 Caribbean Premier League (CPLT20) or for sponsorship reasons, Hero CPL 2021 was the ninth season of the Caribbean Premier League, the domestic Twenty20 cricket league that was played in the West Indies. The tournament was held from 26 August to 15 September 2021, with all the matches took place in Saint Kitts and Nevis. A players' draft was held on 28 May 2021. On 14 July 2021, Cricket West Indies confirmed the fixtures for the tournament. The Trinbago Knight Riders were the defending champions.

Prior to the start of the tournament, two of the franchise teams were renamed. The Barbados Tridents became the Barbados Royals, and the St Lucia Zouks became the Saint Lucia Kings.

In the final, the St Kitts & Nevis Patriots beat the Saint Lucia Kings by three wickets to win their first CPL title.

== Squads ==
The following players were named for the tournament:

Barbados Royals	Guyana Amazon Warriors	Jamaica Tallawahs	St Kitts & Nevis Patriots	Saint Lucia Kings	Trinbago Knight Riders
Jason Holder (c); Johnson Charles; Shai Hope; Kyle Mayers; Hayden Walsh Jr.; Raymon Reifer; Justin Greaves; Nyeem Young; Joshua Bishop; Mohammad Amir; Thisara Perera; Azam Khan; Oshane Thomas; Ashley Nurse; Smit Patel; Glenn Phillips; Jake Lintott; ~~Chris Morris~~; ~~Shafiqullah Ghafari~~	Nicholas Pooran (c); Imran Tahir; Shimron Hetmyer; Brandon King; Naveen-ul-Haq; Romario Shepherd; Chandrapaul Hemraj; Odean Smith; Anthony Bramble; Kevin Sinclair; Ashmead Nedd; Shoaib Malik; Mohammad Hafeez; Nial Smith; Gudakesh Motie; ~~Waqar Salamkheil~~	Rovman Powell (c); Carlos Brathwaite; Chadwick Walton; Fidel Edwards; Veerasammy Permaul; Ryan Persaud; Andre Russell; Haider Ali; Jason Mohammed; Qais Ahmad; Migael Pretorius; Kennar Lewis; Abhijai Mansingh; Joshua James; Kirk McKenzie; Chris Green; Shamarh Brooks; Imran Khan; Imad Wasim; ~~Shakib Al Hasan~~; ~~Ibrahim Zadran~~	Dwayne Bravo (c); Chris Gayle; Rayad Emrit; Sheldon Cottrell; Evin Lewis; Fabian Allen; Sherfane Rutherford; Jon-Russ Jaggesar; Dominic Drakes; Joshua Da Silva; Devon Thomas; Colin Archibald; Asif Ali; Ravi Bopara; Fawad Ahmed; Paul van Meekeren; Naseem Shah; Andre McCarthy; Jonathan Carter; ~~Rassie van der Dussen~~; ~~Anrich Nortje~~; ~~Wanindu Hasaranga~~; ~~Rahmanullah Gurbaz~~; ~~Mikyle Louis~~	Andre Fletcher (c); Faf du Plessis; Rahkeem Cornwall; Kesrick Williams; Obed McCoy; Mark Deyal; Roston Chase; Javelle Glen; Samit Patel; Keemo Paul; Wahab Riaz; Usman Qadir; Keron Cottoy; Jeavor Royal; Kadeem Alleyne; Alzarri Joseph; Tim David; Johnnel Eugene; David Wiese; ~~Matthew Wade~~	Kieron Pollard (c); Denesh Ramdin; Sunil Narine; Colin Munro; Darren Bravo; Lendl Simmons; Khary Pierre; Anderson Phillip; Tion Webster; Akeal Hosein; Jayden Seales; Ali Khan; Ravi Rampaul; Isuru Udana; Leonardo Julien; Yasir Shah; Tim Seifert; ~~Sikandar Raza~~; ~~Sandeep Lamichhane~~

== Venue ==
Basseterre	2021 Caribbean Premier League is located in Saint Kitts and Nevis
Warner Park Sporting Complex	2021 Caribbean Premier League is located in Saint Kitts and Nevis
Capacity: 8,000	2021 Caribbean Premier League is located in Saint Kitts and Nevis

== Points table ==
Pos	Team	Pld	W	L	NR	Pts	NRR
1	Trinbago Knight Riders	10	6	4	0	12	0.700
2	Guyana Amazon Warriors	10	6	4	0	12	0.109
3	St Kitts & Nevis Patriots	10	6	4	0	12	−0.328
4	Saint Lucia Kings	10	5	5	0	10	−0.159
5	Jamaica Tallawahs	10	4	6	0	8	0.124
6	Barbados Royals	10	3	7	0	6	−0.520

Source: ESPNCricinfo

Advanced to the Knockout stage

== League stage ==
26 August 2021
10:00
Scorecard

Guyana Amazon Warriors; 142/7 (20 overs)	v	Trinbago Knight Riders; 133/9 (20 overs)
Shimron Hetmyer 54 (41); Akeal Hosein 2/17 (4 overs); Sunil Narine 2/17 (4 overs)		Denesh Ramdin 28 (25); Romario Shepherd 3/15 (3 overs)

Guyana Amazon Warriors won by 9 runs
Warner Park Sporting Complex, Basseterre
Umpires: Nigel Duguid (WI) and Leslie Reifer (WI)
Player of the match: Odean Smith (Guyana Amazon Warriors)

- Trinbago Knight Riders won the toss and elected to field.

26 August 2021
19:00 (N)
Scorecard

St Kitts & Nevis Patriots; 175/5 (20 overs)	v	Barbados Royals; 154/7 (20 overs)
Sherfane Rutherford 53 (43); Oshane Thomas 3/22 (4 overs)		Shai Hope 44 (38); Dominic Drakes 2/13 (4 overs)

St Kitts & Nevis Patriots won by 21 runs
Warner Park Sporting Complex, Basseterre
Umpires: Zahid Bassarath (WI) and Gregory Brathwaite (WI)
Player of the match: Sherfane Rutherford (St Kitts & Nevis Patriots)

- Barbados Royals won the toss and elected to field.

27 August 2021
10:00
Scorecard

Jamaica Tallawahs; 255/5 (20 overs)	v	Saint Lucia Kings; 135 (17.3 overs)
Andre Russell 50* (14); Obed McCoy 3/52 (4 overs)		Tim David 56 (28); Migael Pretorius 4/32 (4 overs)

Jamaica Tallawahs won by 120 runs
Warner Park Sporting Complex, Basseterre
Umpires: Deighton Butler (WI) and Christopher Taylor (WI)
Player of the match: Andre Russell (Jamaica Tallawahs)

- Saint Lucia Kings won the toss and elected to field.

27 August 2021
19:00 (N)
Scorecard

Barbados Royals; 122 (19.2 overs)	v	Trinbago Knight Riders; 125/4 (16.5 overs)
Azam Khan 30 (21); Isuru Udana 5/21 (4 overs)		Kieron Pollard 58* (30); Mohammad Amir 3/21 (4 overs)

Trinbago Knight Riders won by 6 wickets
Warner Park Sporting Complex, Basseterre
Umpires: Verdayne Smith (WI) and Carl Tuckett (WI)
Player of the match: Isuru Udana (Trinbago Knight Riders)

- Barbados Royals won the toss and elected to bat.

28 August 2021
10:00
Scorecard

Guyana Amazon Warriors; 146/8 (20 overs)	v	St Kitts & Nevis Patriots; 147/2 (18.5 overs)
Chandrapaul Hemraj 39 (30); Dominic Drakes 3/26 (4 overs)		Evin Lewis 62 (39); Naveen-ul-Haq 1/28 (3 overs)

St Kitts & Nevis Patriots won by 8 wickets
Warner Park Sporting Complex, Basseterre
Umpires: Leslie Reifer (WI) and Christopher Taylor (WI)
Player of the match: Devon Thomas (St Kitts & Nevis Patriots)

- Guyana Amazon Warriors won the toss and elected to bat.
- Nial Smith (Guyana Amazon Warriors) made his T20 debut.

28 August 2021
14:30
Scorecard

Barbados Royals; 161/5 (20 overs)	v	Jamaica Tallawahs; 146/9 (20 overs)
Glenn Phillips 56* (46); Veerasammy Permaul 2/15 (4 overs)		Shamarh Brooks 47 (45); Raymon Reifer 3/31 (4 overs)

Barbados Royals won by 15 runs
Warner Park Sporting Complex, Basseterre
Umpires: Zahid Bassarath (WI) and Verdayne Smith (WI)
Player of the match: Raymon Reifer (Barbados Royals)

- Barbados Royals won the toss and elected to bat.

29 August 2021
10:00
Scorecard

Saint Lucia Kings; 157/5 (20 overs)	v	Trinbago Knight Riders; 152/3 (20 overs)
Tim David 43 (32); Ravi Rampaul 3/29 (4 overs)		Tim Seifert 40* (16); Wahab Riaz 1/17 (3 overs)

Saint Lucia Kings won by 5 runs
Warner Park Sporting Complex, Basseterre
Umpires: Deighton Butler (WI) and Nigel Duguid (WI)
Player of the match: Roston Chase (Saint Lucia Kings)

- Trinbago Knight Riders won the toss and elected to field.

29 August 2021
14:30
Scorecard

Guyana Amazon Warriors; 166/3 (20 overs)	v	St Kitts & Nevis Patriots; 168/4 (19.2 overs)
Mohammad Hafeez 70 (59); Paul van Meekeren 2/23 (4 overs)		Sherfane Rutherford 59* (34); Imran Tahir 2/26 (4 overs)

St Kitts & Nevis Patriots won by 6 wickets
Warner Park Sporting Complex, Basseterre
Umpires: Gregory Brathwaite (WI) and Carl Tuckett (WI)
Player of the match: Sherfane Rutherford (St Kitts & Nevis Patriots)

- Guyana Amazon Warriors won the toss and elected to bat.

31 August 2021
10:00
Scorecard

Trinbago Knight Riders; 158/7 (20 overs)	v	Saint Lucia Kings; 131/7 (20 overs)
Kieron Pollard 41 (29); Kesrick Williams 4/24 (4 overs)		Andre Fletcher 81* (55); Ravi Rampaul 3/34 (4 overs)

Trinbago Knight Riders won by 27 runs
Warner Park Sporting Complex, Basseterre
Umpires: Nigel Duguid (WI) and Leslie Reifer (WI)
Player of the match: Kieron Pollard (Trinbago Knight Riders)

- Saint Lucia Kings won the toss and elected to field.

31 August 2021
19:00 (N)
Scorecard

Barbados Royals; 151/8 (20 overs)	v	Jamaica Tallawahs; 155/4 (17.4 overs)
Azam Khan 50 (30); Migael Pretorius 4/45 (4 overs)		Kennar Lewis 89 (53); Joshua Bishop 3/20 (4 overs)

Jamaica Tallawahs won by 6 wickets
Warner Park Sporting Complex, Basseterre
Umpires: Zahid Bassarath (WI) and Gregory Brathwaite (WI)
Player of the match: Kennar Lewis (Jamaica Tallawahs)

- Barbados Royals won the toss and elected to bat.

1 September 2021
10:00
Scorecard

Trinbago Knight Riders; 138/9 (20 overs)	v	Guyana Amazon Warriors; 138/8 (20 overs)
Colin Munro 32 (28); Mohammad Hafeez 3/18 (3 overs)		Nicholas Pooran 27 (15); Ravi Rampaul 4/29 (4 overs)

Match tied
(Guyana Amazon Warriors won the Super Over)
Warner Park Sporting Complex, Basseterre
Umpires: Deighton Butler (WI) and Christopher Taylor (WI)
Player of the match: Romario Shepherd (Guyana Amazon Warriors)

- Guyana Amazon Warriors won the toss and elected to field.
- Trinbago Knight Riders won the toss for Super Over and elected to field.
  Super Over: Guyana Amazon Warriors 6/2 (0.5 overs), Trinbago Knight Riders 4/1 (1 over)

1 September 2021
19:00 (N)
Scorecard

Jamaica Tallawahs; 166/8 (20 overs)	v	St Kitts & Nevis Patriots; 169/4 (17.4 overs)
Carlos Brathwaite 27 (16); Dwayne Bravo 3/25 (4 overs)		Sherfane Rutherford 50* (26); Andre Russell 1/31 (3 overs)

St Kitts & Nevis Patriots won by 6 wickets
Warner Park Sporting Complex, Basseterre
Umpires: Verdayne Smith (WI) and Carl Tuckett (WI)
Player of the match: Sherfane Rutherford (St Kitts & Nevis Patriots)

- St Kitts & Nevis Patriots won the toss and elected to field.
- Joshua James (Jamaica Tallawahs) made his T20 debut.

2 September 2021
10:00
Scorecard

Saint Lucia Kings; 149/7 (20 overs)	v	Guyana Amazon Warriors; 98 (16.5 overs)
Roston Chase 85 (50); Romario Shepherd 3/21 (4 overs)		Nicholas Pooran 41 (26); Jeavor Royal 3/19 (3 overs)

Saint Lucia Kings won by 51 runs
Warner Park Sporting Complex, Basseterre
Umpires: Leslie Reifer (WI) and Christopher Taylor (WI)
Player of the match: Roston Chase (Saint Lucia Kings)

- Guyana Amazon Warriors won the toss and elected to field.
- Gudakesh Motie (Guyana Amazon Warriors) made his T20 debut.

2 September 2021
19:00 (N)
Scorecard

Barbados Royals; 160/8 (20 overs)	v	St Kitts & Nevis Patriots; 163/8 (20 overs)
Smit Patel 54 (48); Dwayne Bravo 4/26 (4 overs)		Chris Gayle 42 (39); Nyeem Young 3/26 (4 overs)

St Kitts & Nevis Patriots won by 2 wickets
Warner Park Sporting Complex, Basseterre
Umpires: Zahid Bassarath (WI) and Verdayne Smith (WI)
Player of the match: Sheldon Cottrell (St Kitts & Nevis Patriots)

- St Kitts & Nevis Patriots won the toss and elected to field.

4 September 2021
10:00
Scorecard

Saint Lucia Kings; 224/2 (20 overs)	v	St Kitts & Nevis Patriots; 124 (16.5 overs)
Faf du Plessis 120* (60); Fawad Ahmed 1/23 (4 overs)		Evin Lewis 73 (42); Keemo Paul 3/23 (3 overs)

Saint Lucia Kings won by 100 runs
Warner Park Sporting Complex, Basseterre
Umpires: Deighton Butler (WI) and Nigel Duguid (WI)
Player of the match: Faf du Plessis (Saint Lucia Kings)

- St Kitts & Nevis Patriots won the toss and elected to field.

4 September 2021
14:30
Scorecard

Barbados Royals; 130 (20 overs)	v	Guyana Amazon Warriors; 136/1 (14.2 overs)
Azam Khan 28 (26); Imran Tahir 3/34 (4 overs)		Chandrapaul Hemraj 105* (56); Nyeem Young 1/32 (3.2 overs)

Guyana Amazon Warriors won by 9 wickets
Warner Park Sporting Complex, Basseterre
Umpires: Gregory Brathwaite (WI) and Carl Tuckett (WI)
Player of the match: Chandrapaul Hemraj (Guyana Amazon Warriors)

- Barbados Royals won the toss and elected to bat.

5 September 2021
10:00
Scorecard

St Kitts & Nevis Patriots; 118 (19.3 overs)	v	Saint Lucia Kings; 121/4 (15.4 overs)
Fabian Allen 34 (32); Jeavor Royal 3/20 (4 overs)		Roston Chase 51* (38); Fabian Allen 2/30 (4 overs)

Saint Lucia Kings won by 6 wickets
Warner Park Sporting Complex, Basseterre
Umpires: Nigel Duguid (WI) and Leslie Reifer (WI)
Player of the match: Roston Chase (Saint Lucia Kings)

- St Kitts & Nevis Patriots won the toss and elected to bat.

5 September 2021
14:30
Scorecard

Jamaica Tallawahs; 144/7 (20 overs)	v	Trinbago Knight Riders; 145/3 (17.1 overs)
Carlos Brathwaite 58 (40); Akeal Hosein 2/12 (4 overs)		Lendl Simmons 70 (45); Imad Wasim 2/19 (4 overs)

Trinbago Knight Riders won by 7 wickets
Warner Park Sporting Complex, Basseterre
Umpires: Zahid Bassarath (WI) and Gregory Brathwaite (WI)
Player of the match: Lendl Simmons (Trinbago Knight Riders)

- Trinbago Knight Riders won the toss and elected to field.
- Kirk McKenzie (Jamaica Tallawahs) made his T20 debut.

7 September 2021
10:00
Scorecard

Trinbago Knight Riders; 167/4 (20 overs)	v	Jamaica Tallawahs; 92 (18.2 overs)
Lendl Simmons 42 (39); Imad Wasim 1/13 (4 overs)		Rovman Powell 22 (20); Ali Khan 4/6 (3 overs)

Trinbago Knight Riders won by 75 runs
Warner Park Sporting Complex, Basseterre
Umpires: Deighton Butler (WI) and Christopher Taylor (WI)
Player of the match: Ali Khan (Trinbago Knight Riders)

- Jamaica Tallawahs won the toss and elected to field.
- Leonardo Julien (Trinbago Knight Riders) made his T20 debut.

7 September 2021
19:00 (N)
Scorecard

Barbados Royals; 185/8 (20 overs)	v	Guyana Amazon Warriors; 140 (17.2 overs)
Glenn Phillips 44 (31); Romario Shepherd 3/31 (4 overs)		Odean Smith 43 (29); Nyeem Young 3/24 (3.2 overs)

Barbados Royals won by 45 runs
Warner Park Sporting Complex, Basseterre
Umpires: Verdayne Smith (WI) and Carl Tuckett (WI)
Player of the match: Kyle Mayers (Barbados Royals)

- Guyana Amazon Warriors won the toss and elected to field.

8 September 2021
10:00
Scorecard

Jamaica Tallawahs; 169/8 (20 overs)	v	St Kitts & Nevis Patriots; 147/8 (20 overs)
Shamarh Brooks 43 (33); Fawad Ahmed 2/14 (3 overs)		Devon Thomas 34 (36); Migael Pretorius 3/25 (4 overs)

Jamaica Tallawahs won by 22 runs
Warner Park Sporting Complex, Basseterre
Umpires: Leslie Reifer (WI) and Christopher Taylor (WI)
Player of the match: Andre Russell (Jamaica Tallawahs)

- St Kitts & Nevis Patriots won the toss and elected to field.

8 September 2021
19:00 (N)
Scorecard

Guyana Amazon Warriors; 151/6 (20 overs)	v	Saint Lucia Kings; 134/6 (20 overs)
Brandon King 77 (57); Wahab Riaz 2/16 (4 overs)		Tim David 47* (42); Odean Smith 2/12 (2 overs)

Guyana Amazon Warriors won by 17 runs
Warner Park Sporting Complex, Basseterre
Umpires: Zahid Bassarath (WI) and Verdayne Smith (WI)
Player of the match: Gudakesh Motie (Guyana Amazon Warriors)

- Guyana Amazon Warriors won the toss and elected to bat.

9 September 2021
10:00
Scorecard

Barbados Royals; 93/9 (20 overs)	v	Trinbago Knight Riders; 99/4 (16.5 overs)
Kyle Mayers 24 (12); Khary Pierre 3/16 (4 overs)		Colin Munro 41* (47); Mohammad Amir 2/19 (3 overs)

Trinbago Knight Riders won by 6 wickets
Warner Park Sporting Complex, Basseterre
Umpires: Deighton Butler (WI) and Nigel Duguid (WI)
Player of the match: Khary Pierre (Trinbago Knight Riders)

- Trinbago Knight Riders won the toss and elected to field.

9 September 2021
19:00 (N)
Scorecard

Jamaica Tallawahs; 211 (20 overs)	v	Saint Lucia Kings; 156 (18.1 overs)
Kennar Lewis 56 (24); Jeavor Royal 3/37 (4 overs)		Mark Deyal 33 (17); Imad Wasim 3/34 (4 overs)

Jamaica Tallawahs won by 55 runs
Warner Park Sporting Complex, Basseterre
Umpires: Gregory Brathwaite (WI) and Carl Tuckett (WI)
Player of the match: Kennar Lewis (Jamaica Tallawahs)

- Jamaica Tallawahs won the toss and elected to bat.
- Kadeem Alleyne (Saint Lucia Kings) made his T20 debut.

11 September 2021
10:00
Scorecard

Saint Lucia Kings; 175/6 (20 overs)	v	Barbados Royals; 155/8 (19 overs)
Faf du Plessis 84 (54); Mohammad Amir 2/31 (4 overs)		Jason Holder 34 (24); David Wiese 5/25 (4 overs)

Saint Lucia Kings won by 15 runs (DLS method)
Warner Park Sporting Complex, Basseterre
Umpires: Nigel Duguid (WI) and Leslie Reifer (WI)
Player of the match: David Wiese (Saint Lucia Kings)

- Barbados Royals won the toss and elected to field.
- Barbados Royals were set a revised target of 170 runs from 19 overs due to rain.

11 September 2021
15:15
Scorecard

Guyana Amazon Warriors; 169/6 (20 overs)	v	Jamaica Tallawahs; 123 (19.1 overs)
Nicholas Pooran 75* (39); Andre Russell 2/35 (4 overs)		Kirk McKenzie 28 (26); Odean Smith 3/21 (4 overs)

Guyana Amazon Warriors won by 46 runs
Warner Park Sporting Complex, Basseterre
Umpires: Zahid Bassarath (WI) and Gregory Brathwaite (WI)
Player of the match: Nicholas Pooran (Guyana Amazon Warriors)

- Guyana Amazon Warriors won the toss and elected to bat.

11 September 2021
19:30 (N)
Scorecard

Trinbago Knight Riders; 159/7 (20 overs)	v	St Kitts & Nevis Patriots; 160/2 (14.4 overs)
Colin Munro 47 (34); Jon-Russ Jaggesar 3/32 (4 overs)		Evin Lewis 102* (52); Kieron Pollard 1/20 (1 over)

St Kitts & Nevis Patriots won by 8 wickets
Warner Park Sporting Complex, Basseterre
Umpires: Deighton Butler (WI) and Christopher Taylor (WI)
Player of the match: Evin Lewis (St Kitts & Nevis Patriots)

- St Kitts & Nevis Patriots won the toss and elected to field.
- St Kitts & Nevis Patriots qualified for the playoffs as a result of this match.

12 September 2021
10:00
Scorecard

Saint Lucia Kings; 190/6 (20 overs)	v	Barbados Royals; 191/2 (18.5 overs)
Roston Chase 56 (38); Kyle Mayers 3/39 (4 overs)		Kyle Mayers 81* (62); Roston Chase 1/35 (3 overs)

Barbados Royals won by 8 wickets
Warner Park Sporting Complex, Basseterre
Umpires: Zahid Bassarath (WI) and Gregory Brathwaite (WI)
Player of the match: Kyle Mayers (Barbados Royals)

- Barbados Royals won the toss and elected to field.

12 September 2021
15:50
Scorecard

Guyana Amazon Warriors; 142/7 (18 overs)	v	Jamaica Tallawahs; 128 (17.1 overs)
Romario Shepherd 72* (31); Imad Wasim 3/15 (4 overs)		Chris Green 31 (20); Odean Smith 3/20 (3.1 overs)

Guyana Amazon Warriors won by 14 runs
Warner Park Sporting Complex, Basseterre
Umpires: Nigel Duguid (WI) and Leslie Reifer (WI)
Player of the match: Romario Shepherd (Guyana Amazon Warriors)

- Guyana Amazon Warriors won the toss and elected to bat.
- The match was reduced to 18 overs per side due to rain.

12 September 2021
20:00 (N)
Scorecard

St Kitts & Nevis Patriots; 147/7 (20 overs)	v	Trinbago Knight Riders; 150/6 (19 overs)
Joshua Da Silva 50 (45); Ali Khan 3/19 (4 overs)		Kieron Pollard 51 (22); Fawad Ahmed 2/16 (4 overs)

Trinbago Knight Riders won by 4 wickets
Warner Park Sporting Complex, Basseterre
Umpires: Verdayne Smith (WI) and Carl Tuckett (WI)
Player of the match: Kieron Pollard (Trinbago Knight Riders)

- Trinbago Knight Riders won the toss and elected to field.

== Knockout stage ==
Semi-finals
1	Trinbago Knight Riders	184 (19.3 overs)
4	Saint Lucia Kings	205/4 (20 overs)
2	Guyana Amazon Warriors	178/9 (20 overs)
3	St Kitts & Nevis Patriots	181/3 (17.5 overs)

Final
4	Saint Lucia Kings	159/7 (20 overs)
3	St Kitts & Nevis Patriots	160/7 (20 overs)

=== Semi-final 1 ===
14 September 2021
10:00
Scorecard

Saint Lucia Kings; 205/4 (20 overs)	v	Trinbago Knight Riders; 184 (19.3 overs)
Mark Deyal 78 (44); Sunil Narine 1/12 (4 overs)		Sunil Narine 30 (17); David Wiese 5/39 (4 overs)

Saint Lucia Kings won by 21 runs
Warner Park Sporting Complex, Basseterre
Umpires: Deighton Butler (WI) and Leslie Reifer (WI)
Player of the match: David Wiese (Saint Lucia Kings)

- Saint Lucia Kings won the toss and elected to bat.

=== Semi-final 2 ===
14 September 2021
15:00
Scorecard

Guyana Amazon Warriors; 178/9 (20 overs)	v	St Kitts & Nevis Patriots; 181/3 (17.5 overs)
Shimron Hetmyer 45* (20); Jon-Russ Jaggesar 2/19 (4 overs)		Evin Lewis 77* (39); Odean Smith 2/48 (4 overs)

St Kitts & Nevis Patriots won by 7 wickets
Warner Park Sporting Complex, Basseterre
Umpires: Gregory Brathwaite (WI) and Nigel Duguid (WI)
Player of the match: Evin Lewis (St Kitts & Nevis Patriots)

- St Kitts & Nevis Patriots won the toss and elected to field.

=== Final ===
15 September 2021
10:00
Scorecard

Saint Lucia Kings; 159/7 (20 overs)	v	St Kitts & Nevis Patriots; 160/7 (20 overs)
Rahkeem Cornwall 43 (32); Naseem Shah 2/27 (4 overs)		Dominic Drakes 48* (24); Wahab Riaz 2/36 (4 overs)

St Kitts & Nevis Patriots won by 3 wickets
Warner Park Sporting Complex, Basseterre
Umpires: Deighton Butler (WI) and Leslie Reifer (WI)
Player of the match: Dominic Drakes (St Kitts & Nevis Patriots)

- Saint Lucia Kings won the toss and elected to bat.

== Statistics ==
=== Most runs ===
Player	Team	Matches	Runs	High score
Roston Chase	Saint Lucia Kings	12	446	85
Evin Lewis	St Kitts & Nevis Patriots	11	426	102 not out
Tim David	Saint Lucia Kings	12	282	56
Faf du Plessis	Saint Lucia Kings	9	277	120 not out
Colin Munro	Trinbago Knight Riders	11	267	47

- Source: ESPN Cricinfo

=== Most wickets ===
Player	Team	Matches	Wickets	Best bowling
Ravi Rampaul	Trinbago Knight Riders	10	19	4/29
Romario Shepherd	Guyana Amazon Warriors	9	18	3/15
Odean Smith	Guyana Amazon Warriors	11	18	3/20
Dominic Drakes	St Kitts & Nevis Patriots	11	16	3/26
Migael Pretorius	Jamaica Tallawahs	10	16	4/32

- Source: ESPN Cricinfo, Last updated: 15 September 2021
