= Isai Thorne =

West Indies cricketer (born 2004)

Personal information
- Born: 23 September 2004 (age 22); Guyana
- Batting: Right-handed
- Bowling: Right arm medium
- Role: Bowler

Domestic team information
- Years: Team
- 2023–present: Combined Campuses and Colleges
- 2023–present: West Indies Academy

Career statistics
Competition	FC	LA
Matches	9	6
Runs scored	41	1
Batting average	6.83	–
100s/50s	0/0	0/0
Top score	14	1*
Balls bowled	918	214
Wickets	31	8
Bowling average	17.38	28.87
5 wickets in innings	0	0
10 wickets in match	0	n/a
Best bowling	4/8	3/65
Catches/stumpings	3/–	0/–
- Source: ESPNcricinfo, 4 July 2024

Isai Thorne (born 23 September 2004) is a West Indian cricketer who currently plays for the Guyana cricket team as a bowler.

== Career ==
In December 2021, he was named in the West Indies squad for the 2022 ICC Under-19 Cricket World Cup. He was awarded a developmental scholarship to join the Guyana Amazon Warriors team ahead of the 2023 Caribbean Premier League. He made his List A debut playing for Combined Campuses and Colleges against Trinidad and Tobago on 17 October 2023 during the 2023–24 Super50 Cup. In November 2023, he was named in the West Indies Academy squad to face Emerging Ireland side in List A and first-class series. He eventually made his first-class debut against the Emerging Ireland side during the series on 25 November 2023.
