= 2025 Inter-Provincial Trophy =

Cricket tournament

- Dates: 17 June – 10 July 2025
- Administrator: Cricket Ireland
- Cricket format: Twenty20
- Tournament format: Quadruple round-robin
- Host: Ireland
- Champions: Leinster Lightning (9th title)
- Participants: 4
- Matches: 24
- Most runs: Tim Tector (507)
- Most wickets: Barry McCarthy (16); Andy McBrine (16); Matthew Humphreys (16)

The 2025 Inter-Provincial Trophy was the thirteenth edition of the Inter-Provincial Trophy, a Twenty20 cricket competition in Ireland. It was the ninth edition of the competition played with full Twenty20 status. The tournament begun on 17 June 2025 and the last match was played on 10 July 2025. Four provincial teams took part in the tournament. In April 2025, Cricket Ireland confirmed the fixtures for the competition. Leinster Lightning were the defending champions.

== Points table ==
Pos	Team	Pld	W	L	T	NR	BP	Pts	NRR
1	Leinster Lightning	12	10	1	0	1	8	50	1.648
2	Northern Knights	12	4	7	0	1	3	21	0.260
3	Munster Reds	12	4	7	0	1	2	20	−0.629
4	North West Warriors	12	4	7	0	1	2	20	−1.225

Source: ESPNcricinfo

Champion

== Fixtures ==
=== Round 1 ===
17 June 2025
10:45
Scorecard

North West Warriors; 191/7 (20 overs)	v	Munster Reds; 162/9 (18.3 overs)
Sam Topping 67 (39); John McNally 3/33 (4 overs)		John McNally 64 (39); Robbie Millar 2/15 (2 overs)

North West Warriors won by 29 runs
Richard Beamish Cricket Grounds, Mardyke
Umpires: Roland Black and Mark Hawthorne
Player of the match: John McNally (Munster Reds)

- Munster Reds won the toss and elected to field.
- Awais Saghir, Bakhtyar Nabi, Matthew Brewster, Philippe le Roux (Munster Reds) Robbie Millar and Josh Wilson (North West Warriors) all made their T20 debuts.
- Points: North West Warriors 4, Munster Reds 0

17 June 2025
15:45
Scorecard

Leinster Lightning; 153/7 (20 overs)	v	Northern Knights; 156/2 (12.4 overs)
Abidullah Taniwal 40 (20); Cian Robertson 2/29 (4 overs)		James McCollum 65* (36); Matt Hollard 2/29 (3 overs)

Northern Knights won by 8 wickets
Richard Beamish Cricket Grounds, Mardyke
Umpires: Roland Black and Jonathan Kennedy
Player of the match: Morgan Topping (Northern Knights)

- Northern Knights won the toss and elected to field.
- Macdara Cosgrave, Jordan Hollard, Matt Hollard and Daniel Murray (Leinster Lightning) all made their T20 debuts.
- Points: Morgan Topping 5, Leinster Lightning 0

=== Round 2 ===
18 June 2025
10:45
Scorecard

North West Warriors; 130 (16.5 overs)	v	Leinster Lightning; 134/6 (15.4 overs)
Andrew Balbirnie 36 (14); Melvin Deveraj 3/21 (3 overs)		Tim Tector 58 (37); Robbie Millar 3/23 (3 overs)

Leinster Lightning won by 4 wickets
Richard Beamish Cricket Grounds, Mardyke
Umpires: Mark Hawthorne and Jonathan Kennedy

- Leinster Lightning won the toss and elected to field.
- Points: Leinster Lightning 5, North West Warriors 0

18 June 2025
15:45
Scorecard

Munster Reds; 215/7 (20 overs)	v	Northern Knights; 168 (15 overs)
Stephen Doheny 150* (56); Cade Carmichael 2/16 (2 overs)		Cade Carmichael 55 (19); Ben White 5/41 (4 overs)

Munster Reds won by 47 runs
Richard Beamish Cricket Grounds, Mardyke
Umpires: Roland Black and Mark Hawthorne
Player of the match: Stephen Doheny (Munster Reds)

- Northern Knights won the toss and elected to field.
- Stephen Doheny (Munster Reds) scored his first century in T20s.

=== Round 3 ===
19 June 2025
10:45
Scorecard

Northern Knights; 175/5 (20 overs)	v	North West Warriors; 66 (12.4 overs)
Cade Carmichael 39* (35); Graham Hume 3/24 (4 overs)		Andy McBrine 12 (8); Cian Robertson 3/10 (2.4 overs)

Northern Knights won by 109 runs
Richard Beamish Cricket Grounds, Mardyke
Umpires: Mark Hawthorne and Jonathan Kennedy
Player of the match: Carson McCullough (Northern Knights)

- North West Warriors won the toss and elected to field.
- Points: Northern Knights 5, North West Warriors 0

19 June 2025
15:45
Scorecard

Munster Reds; 166/6 (20 overs)	v	Leinster Lightning; 169/4 (15.5 overs)
Philippe le Roux 64* (36); Gavin Hoey 4/25 (4 overs)		Christopher De Freitas 70 (29); Bakhtyar Nabi 3/30 (4 overs)

Leinster Lightning won by 6 wickets
Richard Beamish Cricket Grounds, Mardyke
Umpires: Roland Black and Jonathan Kennedy
Player of the match: Gavin Hoey (Leinster Lightning)

- Munster Reds won the toss and elected to bat.
- Points: Leinster Lightning 5, Munster Reds 0

=== Round 4 ===
24 June 2025
10:45
Scorecard

North West Warriors; 181/6 (20 overs)	v	Northern Knights; 42 (6.1 overs)
Sam Topping 71* (57); Ruhan Pretorius 1/18 (4 overs)		Sean Davey 10 (7); Jared Wilson 4/15 (2 overs)

North West Warriors won by 38 runs (DLS method)
Stormont, Belfast
Umpires: Roland Black and Aidan Seaver
Player of the match: Jared Wilson (North West Warriors)

- Northern Knights won the toss and elected to field.
- Northern Knights were set a revised target of 81 runs from 7 overs due to rain.
- Points: North West Warriors 5, Northern Knights 0

24 June 2025
15:45
Scorecard

Munster Reds; 122/9 (20 overs)	v	Leinster Lightning; 123/4 (15.3 overs)
Philippee le Roux 80 (57); Barry McCarthy 4/14 (4 overs)		Lorcan Tucker 45 (40); John McNally 1/9 (2 overs)

Leinster Lightning won by 6 wickets
Stormont, Belfast
Umpires: Mark Hawthorne and Aidan Seaver

- Leinster Lightning won the toss and elected to field.
- Points: Leinster Lightning 5, Munster Reds 0

=== Round 5 ===
25 June 2025
10:45
Scorecard

North West Warriors; 143/8 (20 overs)	v	Leinster Lightning; 147/2 (15.2 overs)
Andrew Balbirnie 44 (35); Matt Hollard 2/20 (3 overs)		Lorcan Tucker 39* (21); Andy McBrine 1/24 (4 overs)

Leinster Lightning won by 8 wickets
Stormont, Belfast
Umpires: Mark Hawthorne and Aidan Seaver
Player of the match: Harry Tector (Leinster Lightning)

- Leinster Lightning won the toss and elected to field.
- Points: Leinster Lightning 5, North West Warriors 0

25 June 2025
15:45
Scorecard

Northern Knights; 177/6 (20 overs)	v	Munster Reds; 152/6 (20 overs)
Ruhan Pretorius 43 (20); Josh Manley 2/31 (4 overs)		John McNally 38 (24); Matthew Humphreys 2/19 (4 overs)

Northern Knights won by 25 runs
Stormont, Belfast
Umpires: Mark Hawthorne and Jonathan Kennedy
Player of the match: Ruhan Pretorius (Northern Knights)

- Munster Reds won the toss and elected to field.
- Points: Northern Knights 4, Munster Reds 0

=== Round 6 ===
26 June 2025
10:45
Scorecard

North West Warriors; 138/8 (20 overs)	v	Munster Reds; 142/8 (20 overs)
Jake Egan 40 (35); Bakhtyar Nabi 2/10 (4 overs)		John McNally 37 (33); Robbie Millar 3/17 (3 overs)

Munster Reds won by 2 wickets
Stormont, Belfast
Umpires: Roland Black and Jonathan Kennedy
Player of the match: Liam McCarthy (Munster Reds)

- Munster Reds won the toss and elected to field.
- Isaac Bird (North West Warriors) made his T20 debut.
- Points: Munster Reds 4, North West Warriors 0

26 June 2025
15:45
Scorecard

Leinster Lightning; 150/8 (20 overs)	v	Northern Knights; 118 (18.2 overs)
Harry Tector 56 (39); Thomas Mayes 3/17 (3 overs)		Cade Carmichael 26 (21); George Dockrell 3/22 (3.2 overs)

Leinster Lightning won by 32 runs
Stormont, Belfast
Umpires: Roland Black and Mark Hawthorne
Player of the match: Harry Tector (Leinster Lightning)

- Leinster Lightning won the toss and elected to bat.
- Points: Leinster Lightning 5, Northern Knights 0

=== Round 7 ===
1 July 2025
10:45
Scorecard

North West Warriors; 186/7 (20 overs)	v	Munster Reds; 129 (20 overs)
Jake Egan 87* (52); John McNally 2/22 (3 overs)		Swapnil Modgill 33 (25); Andy McBrine 3/7 (3 overs)

North West Warriors won by 57 runs
Bready Cricket Club Ground, Magheramason
Umpires: Roland Black and Mark Hawthorne
Player of the match: Jake Egan (North West Warriors)

- Munster Reds won the toss and elected to field.
- Points: North West warriors 5, Munster Reds 0

1 July 2025
15:45
Scorecard

Northern Knights; 123 (18.4 overs)	v	Leinster Lightning; 127/1 (12.3 overs)
Cade Carmichael 30 (19); Barry McCarthy 3/20 (3 overs)		Tim Tector 81* (43); Matthew Humphreys 1/37 (4 overs)

Leinster Lightning won by 9 wickets
Bready Cricket Club Ground, Magheramason
Umpires: Roland Black and Jonathan Kennedy
Player of the match: Tim Tector (Leinster Lightning)

- Northern Knights won the toss and elected to bat.
- Points: Leinster Lightning 5, Northern Knights 0

=== Round 8 ===
2 July 2025
10:45
Scorecard

Munster Reds; 170/6 (20 overs)	v	Northern Knights; 152/1 (11 overs)
John McNally 61 (50); Ruhan Pretorius 2/26 (4 overs)		Paul Stirling 79* (34); John McNally 1/25 (2 overs)

Northern Knights won by 72 runs (DLS method)
Bready Cricket Club Ground, Magheramason
Umpires: George Brolly and Mark Hawthorne
Player of the match: Paul Stirling (Northern Kinghts)

- Munster Reds won the toss and elected to bat.
- No further play was possible due to rain. Northern Knights were 72 runs ahead of DLS target in 11 overs.
- Points: Northern Knights 5, Munster Reds 0

2 July 2025
15:45
Scorecard

Leinster Lightning; 193/5 (20 overs)	v	North West Warriors; 114 (18.1 overs)
Christopher De Freitas 78 (53); Scott MacBeth 1/19 (2 overs)		Andrew Balbirnie 26 (22); Reuben Wilson 3/14 (3.1 overs)

Leinster Lightning won by 79 runs
Bready Cricket Club Ground, Magheramason
Umpires: Mark Hawthorne and Jonathan Kennedy
Player of the match: Christopher De Freitas (Leinster Lightning)

- Point: Leinster Lightning 5, North West Warriors 0

=== Round 9 ===
3 July 2025
10:45
Scorecard

Leinster Lightning	v	Munster Reds

Match abandoned
Bready Cricket Club Ground, Magheramason
Umpires: George Brolly and Jonathan Kennedy

- No toss.
- No play was possible due to rain.
- Points: Leinster Lightning 2, Munster Reds 2

3 July 2025
15:45
Scorecard

Northern Knights	v	North West Warriors

Match abandoned
Bready Cricket Club Ground, Magheramason
Umpires: Mark Hawthorne and Jonathan Kennedy

- No toss.
- No Play was possible due to rain.
- Points: Northern Knights 2, North West Warriors 2

=== Round 10 ===
8 July 2025
10:45
Scorecard

Munster Reds; 159/8 (20 overs)	v	Leinster Lightning; 160/2 (16 overs)
Curtis Campher 57 (35); David Delany 4/19 (4 overs)		Christopher De Freitas 66 (40); Oliver Riley 2/37 (4 overs)

Leinster Lightning won by 8 wickets
Sydney Parade, Dublin
Umpires: Mark Hawthorne and Jonathan Kennedy
Player of the match: David Delany (Leinster Lightning)

- Leinster Lightning won the toss and elected to field.
- Points: Leinster Lightning 5, Munster Reds 0

8 July 2025
15:45
Scorecard

Northern Knights; 173/7 (20 overs)	v	North West Warriors; 177/2 (18.3 overs)
Cade Carmichael 60 (45); Andy McBrine 2/28 (4 overs)		Sam Topping 83 (48); Matthew Humphreys 2/32 (4 overs)

North West Warriors won by 8 wickets
Sydney Parade, Dublin
Umpires: Jonathan Kennedy (Ire) and Connor McGarry (Eng)
Player of the match: Sam Topping (North West Warriors)

- North West Warriors won the toss and elected to field.
- Adam Kennedy (Northern Knights) made his T20 debut.
- Points: North West Warriors 4, Northern Knights 0

=== Round 11 ===
9 July 2025
10:45
Scorecard

Munster Reds; 180/9 (20 overs)	v	Northern Knights; 166 (18.3 overs)
Philippe le Roux 51 (34); Sean Davey 4/29 (4 overs)		Ross Adair 39 (19); Ben White 4/26 (4 overs)

Munster Reds won by 14 run
Sydney Parade, Dublin
Umpires: Mark Hawthorne (Ire) and Connor McGarry (Eng)
Player of the match: Ben White (Munster Reds)

- Northern Knights won the toss and elected to field.
- Points: Munster Reds 4, Northern Knights 0

9 July 2025
15:45
Scorecard

North West Warriors; 198/2 (20 overs)	v	Leinster Lightning; 202/4 (18.4 overs)
Andrew Balbirnie 80 (51); Matt Hollard 1/36 (2 overs)		Tim Tector 101 (52); Andy McBrine 2/24 (4 overs)

Leinster Lightning won by 6 wickets
Sydney Parade, Dublin
Umpires: Jonathan Kennedy (Ire) and Connor McGarry (Eng)
Player of the match: Tim Tector (Leinster Lightning)

- North West Warriors won the toss and elected to bat.
- Tim Tector (Leinster Lightning) scored his maiden century in T20s.
- Points: Leinster Lightning 4, North West Warriors 0

=== Round 12 ===
10 July 2025
10:45
Scorecard

Munster Reds; 188/7 (20 overs)	v	North West Warriors; 88 (13.3 overs)
Curtis Campher 44 (24); Andy McBrine 3/24 (4 overs)		Curtis Campher 5/16 (2.3 overs)

Munster Reds won by 100 runs
Sydney Parade, Dublin
Umpires: Mark Hawthorne (Ire) and Connor McGarry (Eng)
Player of the match: Curtis Campher (Munster Reds)

- Munster Reds won the toss and elected to bat.
- Curtis Campher (Munster Reds) played his 100th T20 match.
- Curtis Campher (Munster Reds) became the first bowler to take five wickets in five balls in men's T20s.
- Points: Munster Reds 5, North West warriors 0

10 July 2025
15:45
Scorecard

Northern Knights; 187/9 (20 overs)	v	Leinster Lightning; 188/8 (19.2 overs)
Morgan Topping 51 (33); Gavin Hoey 4/27 (4 overs)		Tim Tector 85 (47); Thomas Mayes 3/20 (3.2 overs)

Leinster Lightning won by 2 wickets
Sydney Parade, Dublin
Umpires: Mark Hawthorne and Jonathan Kennedy
Player of the match: Tim Tector (Leinster Lightning)

- Leinster Lightning won the toss and elected to field.
- Points: Leinster Lightning 4, Northern Knights 0
