= 2021 CPL =

2021 CPL might refer to:

- 2021 Caribbean Premier League, cricket competition
- 2021 Canadian Premier League season, soccer competition
