= Junior Sinclair =

West Indian cricketer

Personal information
- Full name: Junior Alvin Sinclair
- Born: 28 February 2001 (age 25); Georgetown, Guyana
- Batting: Right-handed
- Bowling: Right-arm off-break
- Role: Bowler

Domestic team information
- Years: Team
- 2022: Guyana Amazon Warriors
- 2023: West Indies Academy
- 2024: Guyana

Career statistics
Competition	LA	T20
Matches	6	17
Runs scored	55	45
Batting average	18.33	45.00
100s/50s	0/0	0/0
Top score	35	14
Balls bowled	43	36
Wickets	3	9
Bowling average	55.66	30.00
5 wickets in innings	0	0
10 wickets in match	0	0
Best bowling	3/40	2/12
Catches/stumpings	1/–	4/–
- Source: Cricinfo, 12 February 2025

Junior Alvin Sinclair (born 28 February 2001) is a West Indian cricketer who has played for both the Guyana cricket team and the West Indies Academy as a bowler.

== Career ==
In September 2022, he made his Twenty20 debut for the Guyana Amazon Warriors against Trinbago Knight Riders in the 2022 Caribbean Premier League. In November 2023, he made his List A debut playing for the West Indies Academy against the Ireland Emerging team during the Ireland Emerging tour of the West Indies.
