= Matthew Nandu =

Guyanese cricketer

Personal information
- Full name: Matthew Rohan Nandu
- Born: 9 June 2003 (age 23); Canada
- Batting: Left-handed
- Bowling: Right-arm offbreak
- Role: Batsman

Domestic team information
- Years: Team
- 2023-present: Guyana
- 2022-present: Guyana Amazon Warriors

Career statistics
Competition	FC	List A	T20
Matches	13	16	2
Runs scored	489	586	40
Batting average	21.26	41.85	20.00
100s/50s	1/1	1/4	0/0
Top score	126	116	37
Balls bowled	29	42	0
Wickets	0	1	0
Bowling average	–	38.00	–
5 wickets in innings	0	0	0
10 wickets in match	0	–	–
Best bowling	–	1/19	–
Catches/stumpings	9/–	2/–	0/–
- Source: Cricinfo, 30 January 2025

Matthew Rohan Nandu (born 9 June 2003) is a Canada-born Guyanese cricketer who plays first-class cricket for Guyana and plays for the Guyana Amazon Warriors in the Caribbean Premier League. His father, Arjune Nandu, appeared in four first-class matches for Guyana. His playing style is often compared with former Guyanese batsman Shivnarine Chanderpaul.

== Early life ==
Nandu was born in Canada where he spent most of his childhood. He attended St. Luke Catholic Elementary School and St. David Catholic Secondary School, where he served as the captain of the school's basketball and volleyball teams. He obtained a Bachelor of Arts degree in psychology at Wilfrid Laurier University in Ontario. He played for the Kaieteur Cricket Club. He began seriously pursuing an interest in cricket, mainly through his father and elder brother Marcus Nandu.

== Career ==
In Guyana, Nandu played domestic cricket for Everest Cricket Club in Guyana's capital Georgetown. He was picked by Vancouver Knights in the players' draft for the 2019 Global T20 Canada. In December 2021, he was named in the West Indies squad for the 2022 ICC Under-19 Cricket World Cup. He scored a century in the plate quarter-finals against Papua New Guinea at 2022 Under-19 Cricket World Cup and was awarded the player of the match. He was drafted by the Guyana Amazon Warriors team for the 2022 Caribbean Premier League and he did not play in any of the games during that season.

Nandu made his first-class debut for Guyana against Barbados on 1 February 2023 during the 2022–23 West Indies Championship. He eventually scored a century on his first-class debut and reached his century off 295 deliveries. He also became the first batsman from Guyana to score a first-class hundred on debut since the turn of the century (Sudesh Dhaniram was the previous Guyanese batsman to have scored a first-class century on debut against Barbados in 1987).

He was named in Guyana Amazon Warriors squad for the inaugural edition of The 6ixty which was played in 2022. He scored a century playing for Kaieteur Cricket Club against Phoenix in the 2023 Brampton-Etobicoke and District Cricket League in Canada. He was retained by Guyana Amazon Warriors in the players' draft held ahead of the 2023 CPL season.

He made his T20 debut playing for the Guyana Amazon Warriors in a league stage match against Jamaica Tallawahs on 13 September 2023 during the 2023 Caribbean Premier League. He stitched a crucial match-winning century partnership, adding 112 runs for the first wicket along with Saim Ayub in his first CPL match while chasing a modest target of 153 runs, and he ended up scoring 37 runs off 35 deliveries to seal the deal for the Guyana Amazon Warriors.

He made his List A debut for West Indies Academy against Combined Campuses and Colleges on 19 October 2023 during the 2023–24 Super50 Cup. In November 2023, he was named in the West Indies Academy squad to face the Emerging Ireland side in List A and first-class series.
