= Irish cricket team against Afghanistan in India in 2019–20 =

International cricket tour

Ireland against Afghanistan in India in 2019–20
	Afghanistan	Ireland
- Dates: 6 – 10 March 2020
Captains	Asghar Afghan	Andrew Balbirnie

Twenty20 International series
- Results: Afghanistan won the 3-match series 2–1
Most runs	Rahmanullah Gurbaz (105)	Harry Tector (97)
Most wickets	Rashid Khan (5); Mujeeb Ur Rahman (5)	Simi Singh (4)
- Player of the series: Rahmanullah Gurbaz (Afg)

The Ireland cricket team toured India in March 2020 to play three Twenty20 International (T20I) matches against Afghanistan. On 11 January 2020, the Afghanistan Cricket Board (ACB) confirmed the fixtures for the three T20I matches.

Originally, the tour had a one-off Test match on the itinerary. However, due to financial constraints with Cricket Ireland, the Test was not included on the tour schedule. Ireland previously toured India in February and March 2019 to play Afghanistan, a series that included the first Test match to be played between the two teams. Afghanistan won the one-off Test match by seven wickets to record their first victory in Test cricket. Prior to the tour, Asghar Afghan was reappointed as Afghanistan's captain across all three formats of international cricket.

The first fixture of the tour was the 1,000th match played by Ireland across all formats, since they played a two-day match in September 1855. Afghanistan won the rain-affected match, extending their record to eleven consecutive wins against Ireland. Afghanistan won the second match by 21 runs, to take an unassailable lead in the series. The third and final match of the series finished in a tie with Ireland winning the Super Over, with Afghanistan winning the series 2–1. It was Ireland's first win against Afghanistan in a T20I match since they beat them in the final of the 2013 ICC World Twenty20 Qualifier.

== Squads ==
T20Is
Afghanistan	Ireland
Asghar Afghan (c); Qais Ahmad; Usman Ghani; Rahmanullah Gurbaz (wk); Karim Janat; Rashid Khan; Mohammad Nabi; Gulbadin Naib; Azmatullah Omarzai; Samiullah Shinwari; Naveen-ul-Haq; Mujeeb Ur Rahman; Najibullah Zadran; Shapoor Zadran; Hazratullah Zazai	Andrew Balbirnie (c); Gareth Delany; George Dockrell; Stephen Doheny; Shane Getkate; Josh Little; Barry McCarthy; Kevin O'Brien; Boyd Rankin; Simi Singh; Paul Stirling; Harry Tector; Lorcan Tucker; ~~Gary Wilson~~; Craig Young

Stephen Doheny was added to Ireland's squad as a replacement for Gary Wilson, after Wilson became ill ahead of the series.

== T20I series ==
=== 1st T20I ===
6 March 2020
14:00
Scorecard

Ireland; 172/6 (20 overs)	v	Afghanistan; 133/5 (15 overs)
Paul Stirling 60 (41); Rashid Khan 3/22 (4 overs)		Najibullah Zadran 42* (21); Simi Singh 2/18 (3 overs)

Afghanistan won by 11 runs (DLS method)
Shaheed Vijay Singh Pathik Sports Complex, Greater Noida
Umpires: Ahmed Shah Durrani (Afg) and Bismillah Jan Shinwari (Afg)
Player of the match: Rashid Khan (Afg)

- Ireland won the toss and elected to bat.
- Rain during Afghanistan's innings prevented any further play.

=== 2nd T20I ===
8 March 2020
14:00
Scorecard

Afghanistan; 184/4 (20 overs)	v	Ireland; 163/6 (20 overs)
Asghar Afghan 49 (28); Craig Young 1/27 (4 overs)		Andrew Balbirnie 46 (35); Mujeeb Ur Rahman 3/38 (4 overs)

Afghanistan won by 21 runs
Shaheed Vijay Singh Pathik Sports Complex, Greater Noida
Umpires: Ahmed Shah Pakteen (Afg) and Izatullah Safi (Afg)
Player of the match: Mujeeb Ur Rahman (Afg)

- Afghanistan won the toss and elected to bat.

=== 3rd T20I ===
10 March 2020
14:00
Scorecard

Ireland; 142/8 (20 overs)	v	Afghanistan; 142/7 (20 overs)
Gareth Delany 37 (29); Naveen-ul-Haq 3/21 (4 overs)		Rahmanullah Gurbaz 42 (29); Gareth Delany 2/21 (4 overs)

Match tied
(Ireland won the Super Over)
Shaheed Vijay Singh Pathik Sports Complex, Greater Noida
Umpires: Ahmed Shah Pakteen (Afg) and Bismillah Jan Shinwari (Afg)
Player of the match: Kevin O'Brien (Ire)

- Ireland won the toss and elected to bat.
- Qais Ahmad (Afg) made his T20I debut.
