= Carlon Bowen-Tuckett =

West Indies cricketer

Personal information
- Born: 28 February 2004 (age 21)
- Batting: Right-handed
- Role: Batsman

Domestic team information
- Years: Team
- 2022-present: West Indies Academy

Carlon Bowen-Tuckett (born 28 February 2004) is a West Indies cricketer.

== Career ==
In December 2021, he was named in the West Indies squad for the 2022 ICC Under-19 Cricket World Cup. He made his List A debut playing for West Indies Academy against Barbados on 11 November 2022 during the 2022–23 Super50 Cup. In November 2023, he was named in the West Indies Academy squad to face Emerging Ireland side in List A and first-class series. He eventually made his first-class debut against the Emerging Ireland side during the series on 25 November 2023.
