= Matthew Foster =

Irish cricketer (born 2000)

Personal information
- Full name: Matthew Thomas Foster
- Born: 15 January 2000 (age 26); Belfast, Northern Ireland
- Batting: Left-handed
- Bowling: Right-arm fast-medium
- Role: Bowler

Domestic team information
- Years: Team
- 2019: Northern Knights
- 2020: Munster Reds
- 2021–2025: Northern Knights

Career statistics
Competition	FC	LA	T20
Matches	10	33	22
Runs scored	28	26	10
Batting average	3.11	3.71	10.00
100s/50s	0/0	0/0	0/0
Top score	6	8	8
Balls bowled	1,062	1,227	382
Wickets	14	31	31
Bowling average	55.64	36.38	20.03
5 wickets in innings	0	0	0
10 wickets in match	0	0	0
Best bowling	3/81	3/12	4/30
Catches/stumpings	0/–	6/–	5/–
- Source: Cricinfo, 7 December 2025

Matthew Thomas Foster (born 15 January 2000) is an Irish cricketer from Northern Ireland, currently playing for Northern Knights in Irish provincial competition. He plays club cricket for Waringstown CC in the NCU Premier League.

== Domestic career ==
While studying Sports Performance Analysis at Cardiff Met University he made his first-class debut on 31 March 2019, for Cardiff MCCU against Sussex, as part of the Marylebone Cricket Club University fixtures.

Foster made his List A debut for Northern Knights in the 2019 Inter-Provincial Cup in Ireland on 20 August 2019. Having switched to Munster Reds for the 2020 season he made his Twenty20 debut for them in the 2020 Inter-Provincial Trophy on 20 August 2020.

He returned to the Knights for the 2021 season.

In March 2023 he was awarded a casual contract by Cricket Ireland.

He took 14 wickets in 8 matches across the 2023 season as Northern Knights achieved an Irish domestic double winning both the List A and T20 competitions.

== International career ==
In February 2023 he received his first international call-up, included in the Test and ODI squad for the tour of Sri Lanka. He later had to withdraw from the squad as his rehabilitation from a previous injury had not been completed in time.

In May 2023, he was named in Test squad for their tour of England in June 2023. As part of a First-class warm up match he played for Essex against an Ireland XI, going wicketless in 11 overs.

Foster was a part of the Ireland Emerging squad that toured the West Indies in late 2023. He played two List A and two First-class fixtures against a West Indies Academy team, taking 7 wickets.

Foster was again named in Ireland's Test squad for their one-off Test against Afghanistan but was not selected to play.
