= Kevlon Anderson =

Guyanese cricketer

Personal information
- Full name: Kevlon Alston Anderson
- Born: 28 September 2000 (age 26); Cumberland, Guyana
- Batting: Right-handed
- Bowling: Right-arm fast-medium
- Role: Top-order batter

International information
- National side: West Indies (2025)
- Only Test (cap 344): 12 July 2025 v Australia

Domestic team information
- Years: Team
- 2022–present: West Indies Academy
- 2023–present: Guyana
- 2023–present: Guyana Amazon Warriors

Career statistics
Competition	Test	FC	LA	T20
Matches	1	24	26	8
Runs scored	3	1,514	573	91
Batting average	1.50	42.05	27.28	13.00
100s/50s	0/0	5/6	0/3	0/0
Top score	3	153	83	47
Balls bowled	0	204	380	0
Wickets	0	5	6	0
Bowling average	–	25.40	53.16	–
5 wickets in innings	0	1	0	0
10 wickets in match	0	0	–	–
Best bowling	–	5/57	2/44	–
Catches/stumpings	3/–	30/–	10/–	3/–
- Source: ESPNcricinfo, 15 December 2025

Kevlon Alston Anderson (born 28 September 2000) is a Guyanese cricketer, who is a right-handed top order batsman. He plays for Guyana national cricket team, having previously represented the West Indies under-19 cricket team.

== Early career ==
In July 2013, Anderson was named as the top cricketer at the 16th Annual Rose Hall Town Youth and Sports Club Academy. He played for Guyana in age level local cricket competitions like West Indies Cricket Board Under-15 and Under-19 Tournament from 2015 to 2017. In November 2019, he was named in West Indies' squad for the 2020 Under-19 Cricket World Cup. He made his under-19 international debut for the West Indies Under-19s on 6 December 2019, against England Under-19s in the 2019–20 West Indies Under-19 Tri-Nation Series. He was one of the top performers for the West Indies in the 2020 Under-19 CWC.

In February 2021, he was awarded academy contract by the Guyana Cricket Board ahead of the 2020–21 domestic season. In July 2022, he was named in the inaugural batch of the CWI Emerging Players Academy for high-performance training and development sessions.

== Domestic career ==
In October 2022, Anderson was named in West Indies Academy's squad for the 2022–23 Super50 Cup. He made his List A debut for West Indies Academy on 29 October 2022, against the Leeward Islands.

In February 2023, he moved to Trinidad and Tobago to play club cricket for Preysal Cricket Club. In March 2023, he earned his maiden call-up to Guyana to play for them in the third round of the 2022–23 West Indies Championship, after he had made impressive performance in the Trinidad and Tobago Cricket Board Three-Day Championship. He made his first-class debut for Guyana on 15 March 2023, against Trinidad and Tobago. In April 2023, he was selected to play for West Indies Academy in the inaugural 2023 Headley Weekes Tri-Series. On 20 April 2023, he claimed his maiden century in first-class cricket, against Team Headley. His score of 153 runs helped West Indies Academy to win the match by seven wickets.
