= Kelvin Pitman =

West Indies cricketer

Personal information
- Born: 4 June 2003 (age 23)
- Batting: Right-handed
- Bowling: Right-arm fast
- Role: Bowler

Domestic team information
- Years: Team
- 2022-present: West Indies Academy
- 2023: Jamaica Tallawahs
- 2024: Antigua & Barbuda Falcons

Kelvin Pitman (born 4 June 2003) is a West Indies cricketer who currently plays for the West Indies Academy as a bowler.

== Career ==
He made his List A debut playing for the West Indies Academy against Leeward Islands on 9 November 2022 during the 2022–23 Super50 Cup. He was signed by St Kitts & Nevis Patriots for the 2022 Caribbean Premier League season, but he didn't play in any of the matches during that season.

He made his first-class debut on 19 April 2023 playing for West Indies Academy against Team Headley during the 2023 Headley Weekes Tri-Series. He was signed by Jamaica Tallawahs for the 2023 Caribbean Premier League season. He eventually made his T20 debut during the 2023 season in a league stage match against the Trinbago Knight Riders on 3 September 2023 and had a memorable CPL debut by picking up 3/27 in his quota of four overs.

In November 2023, he was named in the West Indies Academy squad to face Emerging Ireland side in List A and first-class series.
