= Dominic Drakes =

West Indian cricketer

Personal information
- Full name: Dominic Conneil Drakes
- Born: 6 February 1998 (age 28); Barbados
- Batting: Left-handed
- Bowling: Left-arm medium-fast
- Role: Bowling all-rounder
- Relatives: Vasbert Drakes (father)

International information
- National side: West Indies
- ODI debut (cap 216): 4 June 2023 v United Arab Emirates
- Last ODI: 27 July 2023 v India
- T20I debut (cap 89): 13 December 2021 v Pakistan
- Last T20I: 14 August 2022 v New Zealand

Domestic team information
- Years: Team
- 2017/18–present: Barbados (squad no. 46)
- 2018: Barbados Tridents
- 2019–present: St Kitts & Nevis Patriots
- 2022: Yorkshire (squad no. 48)
- 2022: Colombo Stars
- 2023: Warwickshire (squad no. 48)

Career statistics
Competition	T20I	FC	LA	T20
Matches	10	2	25	34
Runs scored	15	60	261	172
Batting average	3.00	20.00	17.39	13.23
100s/50s	0/0	0/0	0/0	0/0
Top score	5	33	38*	48*
Balls bowled	192	242	997	685
Wickets	6	4	26	36
Bowling average	48.33	34.25	33.30	28.47
5 wickets in innings	0	0	0	0
10 wickets in match	0	0	0	0
Best bowling	1/19	2/11	4/44	3/26
Catches/stumpings	2/–	1/–	3/–	9/–
- Source: Cricinfo, 6 June 2023

Dominic Conneil Drakes (born 6 February 1998) is a Barbadian cricketer. He plays for Barbados in domestic cricket and for the St Kitts & Nevis Patriots in the Caribbean Premier League (CPL). Dominic Drakes is the son of Vasbert Drakes, who played international cricket for the West Indies.

== Career ==
Drakes made his first-class debut for Barbados in the 2017–18 Regional Four Day Competition on 18 January 2018. He made his List A debut for Barbados in the 2017–18 Regional Super50 on 9 February 2018.

Ahead of the 2018 Caribbean Premier League, Drakes was named as one of five players to watch in the tournament. He made his Twenty20 debut for Barbados Tridents in the tournament on 4 September 2018. In October 2019, he was named in the West Indies Emerging Team for the 2019–20 Regional Super50 tournament.

In July 2020, Drakes was named in the St Kitts & Nevis Patriots squad for the 2020 Caribbean Premier League.

On 15 September 2021, Drakes scored an unbeaten 48 runs off 24 balls in the final of the 2021 Caribbean Premier League (CPL), which helped St Kitts & Nevis Patriots to register their first CPL title. He was also named the man of the match. The following month, he was added to the Chennai Super Kings' squad for the 2021 Indian Premier League, replacing Sam Curran, who was ruled out due to injury.

In November 2021, Drakes was named in the West Indies' Twenty20 International (T20I) squad for their series against Pakistan. He made his T20I debut on 13 December 2021, for the West Indies against Pakistan.

In February 2022, he was bought by the Gujarat Titans in the auction for the 2022 Indian Premier League tournament. In July 2022, he was signed by the Colombo Stars for the third edition of the Lanka Premier League.

In May 2023, he was named in West Indies One Day International (ODI) squad for the series against United Arab Emirates. He made his ODI debut in the first ODI of the series, on 4 June 2023.
