= Emerging Ireland cricket team =

Second-tier national team

Personnel
- Captain: Matthew Humphreys (List A); Stephen Doheny (First-class)
- Coach: Peter Johnston
- Owner: Cricket Ireland

Team information
- Founded: 2023

History
- First-class debut: West Indies Academy in 2023 at Coolidge Cricket Ground, Antigua
- Official website: Official Website

The Emerging Ireland cricket team is a cricket team organized by Cricket Ireland to provide opportunities for promising players to showcase their talent and develop their skills. Established in 2023, the team serves as a stepping stone for players aiming to break into the senior national team.

== History ==
The inception of Emerging Ireland can be traced back to the need for a platform to nurture young talent within Irish cricket. With Ireland gaining prominence on the international cricket stage, there arose a necessity to build a pipeline of players capable of seamlessly transitioning to the senior national team.

Emerging Ireland played their first ever List A and First-class match against West Indies Academy during the Emerging Ireland cricket tour of the West Indies in 2023, where they lost both List A and First-class series by 1-2 and 0-2 respectively.
