= Jordan Johnson (cricketer) =

West Indies cricketer

Personal information
- Full name: Jordan Ethan Zahir Johnson
- Born: 26 April 2005 (age 21); Jamaica
- Batting: Left-handed
- Bowling: Leg break
- Role: Batsman

Domestic team information
- Years: Team
- 2023-present: Combined Campuses and Colleges
- 2025: Dubai Capitals

Career statistics
Competition	FC	LA	T20
Matches	11	11	1
Runs scored	359	204	1
Batting average	17.09	22.66	1.00
100s/50s	0/1	0/1	0/0
Top score	61	50	1
Catches/stumpings	3/–	5/–	0/–
- Source: Cricinfo, 5 December 2023

Jordan Ethan Zahir Johnson (born 26 April 2005) is a West Indian cricketer. He also played age group cricket representing the West Indies under-19 cricket team.

== Career ==
In September 2023, he had a successful tour to Sri Lanka with the West Indies Rising Stars Men's U19 side, where he ended up the series with three centuries in a two-match unofficial Test series. He was awarded the player of the series after scoring 358 runs in across three innings, despite the West Indies losing the series to Sri Lanka U19s 1–0.

He made his List A debut playing for Combined Campuses and Colleges against Trinidad and Tobago on 17 October 2023 during the 2023–24 Super50 Cup. In November 2023, he was named in the West Indies Academy squad to face Emerging Ireland side in List A and first-class series.

In November 2023, he was named in the West Indies A side for their tour of South Africa to play against the South African A side in a three-match first-class series. He made his first-class debut during the series against South Africa A on 5 December 2023.
