= Jahmar Hamilton =

Anguillian cricketer

Personal information
- Full name: Jahmar Neville Hamilton
- Born: 22 September 1990 (age 36); St. Thomas, Anguilla
- Batting: Right-handed
- Role: Wicket-keeper

International information
- National side: West Indies (2019–2021)
- Only Test (cap 320): 30 August 2019 v India
- Only ODI (cap 204): 25 January 2021 v Bangladesh

Domestic team information
- Years: Team
- 2008–present: Anguilla
- 2008–present: Leeward Islands
- 2013: Antigua Hawksbills
- 2019: St Lucia Zouks
- 2020: St Kitts & Nevis Patriots
- 2024: Antigua & Barbuda Falcons

Career statistics
Competition	Test	ODI	FC	LA
Matches	1	1	113	78
Runs scored	5	5	5540	1905
Batting average	2.50	5.00	28.70	30.72
100s/50s	0/0	0/0	6/34	0/12
Top score	5		130*	96*
Catches/stumpings	5/0	0/0	237/16	61/11
- Source: CricInfo, 20 April 2025

Jahmar Neville Hamilton (born 22 September 1990) is an Anguillan cricketer. He plays as wicket-keeper and is part of the Leeward Islands cricket team. He made his international debut for the West Indies cricket team in August 2019.

== Domestic career ==
He made his Twenty20 debut for the Anguilla cricket team against Grenada at the 2007/08 Stanford 20/20 Tournament in Antigua, and his first-class debut for the Leeward Islands in February 2008 against Barbados.

In 2013, Hamilton was included in the Antigua Hawksbills squad for the inaugural season of the Twenty20 Caribbean Premier League.

He was the top run-scorer for the Leeward Islands in the 2016-17 Regional Four Day Competition, and the only player in the team to score multiple centuries in the tournament.

== International career ==
In May 2018, he was named in the West Indies' Test squad for their series against Sri Lanka, but he did not make it to the playing eleven. In August 2018, he was included in the West Indies' Test squad for the series against India, and again he was not picked in the final team. In November 2018, he was once again named in the West Indies' Test side, this time for the series against Bangladesh. In August 2019, Hamilton was added to the West Indies' Test squad for the second Test against India, replacing Shane Dowrich, who had an ankle injury. He made his Test debut for the West Indies, against India, on 30 August 2019.

In December 2020, Hamilton was named in the West Indies' One Day International (ODI) squad for their series against Bangladesh. He made his ODI debut for the West Indies, against Bangladesh, on 25 January 2021.

== Football career ==
Hamilton also played football, representing his country during 2007 CONCACAF U17 Tournament qualification.
