= McKenny Clarke =

West Indies cricketer

Personal information
- Born: 5 June 2003 (age 23); Saint Lucia
- Batting: Right-handed
- Bowling: Right-arm fast medium
- Role: Bowler

Domestic team information
- Years: Team
- 2022-present: West Indies Academy
- 2023-present: Saint Lucia Kings

Career statistics
Competition	FC	LA	T20
Matches	8	13	3
Runs scored	118	12	0
Batting average	10.72	1.71	0.00
100s/50s	0/0	0/0	0/0
Top score	30	6	0
Balls bowled	840	386	30
Wickets	15	9	0
Bowling average	38.80	41.44	–
5 wickets in innings	0	0	0
10 wickets in match	0	0	0
Best bowling	3/26	2/20	–
Catches/stumpings	4/–	5/–	4/–
- Source: ESPNcricinfo, 20 April 2025

McKenny Clarke (born 5 June 2003) is a West Indies cricketer who currently plays for the West Indies Academy as a bowler.

== Career ==
In December 2021, he was named in the West Indies squad for the 2022 ICC Under-19 Cricket World Cup. He made his List A debut playing for the West Indies Academy against Leeward Islands on 29 October 2022 during the 2022–23 Super50 Cup.

He made his first-class debut on 26 April 2023 playing for West Indies Academy against Team Weekes during the 2023 Headley Weekes Tri-Series. He was signed by Saint Lucia Kings for the 2023 Caribbean Premier League season. He eventually made his T20 debut during the 2023 season in a league stage match against the Trinbago Knight Riders on 26 August 2023.

In November 2023, he was named in the West Indies Academy squad to face Emerging Ireland side in List A and first-class series.
