= Anderson Phillip =

Trinidadian cricketer

Personal information
- Born: 22 September 1996 (age 30)
- Batting: Right-handed
- Bowling: Right-arm fast-medium
- Role: Bowler

International information
- National side: West Indies
- Test debut (cap 329): 24 June 2022 v Bangladesh
- Last Test: 8 December 2022 v Australia
- ODI debut (cap 206): 14 March 2021 v Sri Lanka
- Last ODI: 10 July 2022 v Bangladesh

Domestic team information
- Years: Team
- 2016-present: Trinidad and Tobago
- 2016–2018: Trinbago Knight Riders
- 2024: Pokhara Avengers
- 2024-: Lancashire

Career statistics
Competition	Test	ODI	FC	LA
Matches	2	5	40	30
Runs scored	53	22	558	65
Batting average	26.50	22.00	13.60	13.00
100s/50s	0/0	0/0	0/1	0/0
Top score	43	21*	63*	21*
Balls bowled	276	195	5,334	1,143
Wickets	3	4	139	40
Bowling average	70.66	51.75	23.76	28.02
5 wickets in innings	0	0	7	0
10 wickets in match	0	0	1	0
Best bowling	2/30	2/50	6/19	4/44
Catches/stumpings	0/–	2/–	19/–	9/0
- Source: Cricinfo, 8 April 2025

Anderson Phillip (born 22 September 1996) is a Trinidadian cricketer. He made his international debut for the West Indies cricket team in March 2021.

== Career ==
He made his first-class debut for Trinidad and Tobago in the 2016–17 Regional Four Day Competition on 17 March 2017. In November 2019, he was named in Trinidad and Tobago's squad for the 2019–20 Regional Super50 tournament. He made his List A debut on 7 November 2019, for Trinidad and Tobago in the 2019–20 Regional Super50 tournament.

In June 2020, Phillip was named as one of eleven reserve players in the West Indies' Test squad, for their series against England. The Test series was originally scheduled to start in May 2020, but was moved back to July 2020 due to the COVID-19 pandemic. In July 2020, he was named in the Trinbago Knight Riders squad for the 2020 Caribbean Premier League.

In March 2021, he was added to the West Indies' One Day International (ODI) squad for the series against Sri Lanka. He made his ODI debut for the West Indies on 14 March 2021, against Sri Lanka. In February 2022, Phillip was named in the West Indies' Test squad for their series against England. In June 2022, he was again named in the West Indies' Test squad, this time for their series against Bangladesh. He made his Test debut on 24 June 2022, for the West Indies against Bangladesh.

In September 2024, Phillip was signed by Lancashire County Cricket Club to play in the County Championship. In November of that year, he re-signed for the club to play in the Championship and the T20 Blast. Phillip was unable to play for the Trinidad and Tobago Red Force in the final leg of matches in the West Indies Championship in April in order to fulfill his contract with Lancashire.
