= Kadeem Alleyne =

Barbadian cricketer (born 2001)

Personal information
- Born: 1 January 2001 (age 25)
- Batting: Right-handed
- Bowling: Right-arm medium
- Role: All-rounder

Domestic team information
- Years: Team
- 2021: Saint Lucia Kings
- 2022/23: Eagles
- 2023: Trinbago Knight Riders
- 2023/24: Combined Campuses and Colleges
- 2024: Barbados Royals
- 2024/25: Barbados
- 2024/25: Sylhet Strikers
- 2025: Dubai Capitals

Career statistics
Competition	FC	LA	T20
Matches	8	22	34
Runs scored	512	490	397
Batting average	32.00	23.33	14.70
100s/50s	0/5	0/3	0/0
Top score	93	76	47
Balls bowled	300	525	44
Wickets	8	18	3
Bowling average	29.75	31.88	28.66
5 wickets in innings	0	0	0
10 wickets in match	0	0	0
Best bowling	3/44	4/50	3/53
Catches/stumpings	10/–	14/–	19/–
- Source: Cricinfo, 8 October 2021

Kadeem Alleyne (born 1 January 2001) is a Barbadian cricketer. In August 2021, he was named in the Saint Lucia Kings' squad for the 2021 Caribbean Premier League. He made his Twenty20 debut on 9 September 2021, for the Saint Lucia Kings in the 2021 Caribbean Premier League.
