= Morgan Topping =

Irish cricketer (born 1999)

Personal information
- Full name: Morgan Lyness Topping
- Born: 25 March 1999 (age 27); Craigavon, Northern Ireland
- Batting: Right-handed
- Bowling: Right-arm off break
- Relatives: Sam Topping (brother)

Domestic team information
- Years: Team
- 2017–present: Northern Knights

Career statistics
Competition	FC	LA	T20
Matches	5	29	29
Runs scored	177	642	512
Batting average	19.66	25.68	24.38
100s/50s	0/1	0/4	0/5
Top score	78	92	60
Catches/stumpings	3/–	2/–	4/–
- Source: Cricinfo, 28 June 2026

Morgan Lyness Topping (born 25 March 1999) is an Irish cricketer from Northern Ireland. He made his List A debut for Northern Knights in the 2017 Inter-Provincial Cup on 4 June 2017. In December 2017, he was named in Ireland's squad for the 2018 Under-19 Cricket World Cup. He made his Twenty20 debut on 19 September 2021, for Northern Knights in the 2021 Inter-Provincial Trophy. In January 2025, Topping was named in the Ireland squad for their tour of Zimbabwe to take place the following month.
