= Leonardo Julien =

West Indian cricketer (born 2001)

Personal information
- Full name: Leonardo Julien
- Born: 9 September 2001 (age 25); Trinidad and Tobago
- Batting: Left-handed
- Role: Wicket-keeper

Career statistics
Competition	LA	T20
Matches	8	3
Runs scored	146	20
Batting average	18.25	6.66
100s/50s	0/1	0/0
Top score	83	17
Balls bowled	-	-
Wickets	-	-
Bowling average	-	-
5 wickets in innings	-	-
10 wickets in match	-	-
Best bowling	-/-	-/-
Catches/stumpings	3/–	1/–
- Source: Cricinfo, 30 September 2022

Leonardo Julien (born 9 September 2001) is a West Indian cricketer. He made his List A debut for West Indies B in the 2018–19 Regional Super50 tournament on 3 October 2018. In October 2019, he was named to the West Indies Emerging Team for the 2019–20 Regional Super50 tournament. In November 2019, he was named to the West Indies' squad for the 2020 Under-19 Cricket World Cup. He made his Twenty20 debut on 7 September 2021, for the Trinbago Knight Riders in the 2021 Caribbean Premier League.
