= Ackeem Auguste =

West Indian cricketer

Personal information
- Full name: Ackeem Wayne Jarrell Auguste
- Born: 12 September 2003 (age 23); Castries, St. Lucia
- Height: 5 ft 10 in (1.78 m)
- Batting: Left-handed
- Bowling: Legbreak
- Role: Top order batsman

International information
- National side: West Indies (2025–present)
- ODI debut (cap 228): 21 October 2025 v Bangladesh
- Last ODI: 23 October 2025 v Bangladesh
- T20I debut (cap 104): 27 September 2025 v Nepal
- Last T20I: 29 September 2025 v Nepal

Domestic team information
- Years: Team
- 2022: Windward Islands
- 2022–present: West Indies Academy
- 2022–present: Saint Lucia Kings
- 2025: Windward Islands Infernos

Career statistics
Competition	ODI	T20I	FC	LA
Matches	4	9	22	28
Runs scored	56	164	1006	593
Batting average	14.00	23.42	26.47	23.72
100s/50s	0/0	0/1	0/6	0/3
Top score	22	50	93	81
Balls bowled	0	0	116	114
Wickets	0	0	2	4
Bowling average	–	–	50.50	29.00
5 wickets in innings	0	0	0	0
10 wickets in match	–	–	0	–
Best bowling	–	–	2/45	4/47
Catches/stumpings	3/–	3/–	20/–	11/–
- Source: Cricinfo, 20 December 2025

Ackeem Wayne Jarrell Auguste (born 12 September 2003) is a Saint Lucian cricketer who currently plays for the West Indies in the T20 International and One Day International formats, as a top order batsman. He is the second cricketer from Saint Lucia with two middle names to play for the West Indies after Daren Sammy. He was the captain of the West Indies Under-19 squad that participated in the 2022 Under-19 Men's Cricket World Cup.

== Career ==
In May 2022, he made his first class debut for the Windward Islands against Jamaica in the 2021–22 West Indies Championship. In September 2022, he made his Twenty20 debut for the Saint Lucia Kings against Trinbago Knight Riders in the 2022 Caribbean Premier League. He was a member of the Kings squad that won a maiden CPL title in 2024.

In October 2022, he made his List A debut playing for the West Indies Academy against the Leeward Islands in the 2022–23 Super50 Cup.

He made his T20 International debut against Nepal in Sharjah, United Arab Emirates, in September 2025. In October 2025, he made his One Day International debut against Bangladesh, for the second ODI at Dhaka.
