= Joshua Bishop =

Barbadian cricketer (born 2000)

Personal information
- Born: 30 May 2000 (age 26); Barbados
- Batting: Right-handed
- Bowling: Slow left-arm orthodox
- Role: Bowler

Domestic team information
- Years: Team
- 2017–present: West Indies Academy
- 2019–2023: Barbados Royals

Career statistics
Competition	FC	LA	T20
Matches	22	54	16
Runs scored	891	333	66
Batting average	28.74	10.40	33.00
100s/50s	2/3	0/0	0/0
Top score	102*	37	18*
Balls bowled	4822	2731	281
Wickets	100	79	12
Bowling average	23.73	22.82	30.00
5 wickets in innings	4	1	0
10 wickets in match	2	0	0
Best bowling	7/85	5/35	3/20
Catches/stumpings	10/0	17/0	5/0
- Source: ESPNcricinfo, 20 December 2025

Joshua Bishop (born 30 May 2000) is a Barbadian cricketer, who is a slow left-arm orthodox bowler. He plays for the Barbados national cricket team.

== Career ==
He made his List A debut for the West Indies Under-19s in the 2016–17 Regional Super50 on 25 January 2017. In July 2017, he was named U-19 Cricketer of the Year by the West Indies Players' Association. In August 2019, Cricket West Indies named him as the Under-19 Player of the Year. He made his Twenty20 debut on 20 September 2019, for the Barbados Tridents, in the 2019 Caribbean Premier League. In October 2019, he was selected to play for Barbados in the 2019–20 Regional Super50 tournament.

In July 2020, he was named in the Barbados Tridents squad for the 2020 Caribbean Premier League.

In April 2023, Joshua was named in West Indies Academy's squad for the 2023 Headley Weekes Tri-Series. He made his first-class debut for West Indies Academy on 19 April 2023, against Team Headley. In November 2023, he was named in West Indies Academy's squad for their series against Emerging Ireland. He scored his maiden first-class century on 27 November 2023, during the first unofficial Test match.
