= Coolidge Cricket Ground =

Cricket ground in Saint George Parish, Antigua

Coordinates: 17°08′27″N 61°47′41″W

- Interactive map of Coolidge Cricket Ground

Ground information
- Location: Coolidge, Saint George, Antigua
- Country: West Indies
- Establishment: 2004
- Capacity: 5,000
- Operator: Government of Antigua and Barbuda
- End names
- Pavilion End; Airport Road End

International information
- First men's T20I: 3 March 2021: West Indies v Sri Lanka
- Last men's T20I: 14 November 2021: Argentina v Bermuda
- First women's ODI: 5 September 2019: West Indies v Australia
- Last women's ODI: 7 September 2021: West Indies v South Africa
- First women's T20I: 19 October 2017: West Indies v Sri Lanka
- Last women's T20I: 2 July 2021: West Indies v Pakistan

Team information
Guyana	(2001/02–2008/09)
Antigua Barracuda FC	(2011–2012)
- As of 14 November 2021; Source: Cricinfo

The Coolidge Cricket Ground is a cricket ground in Osbourn, Saint George Parish, Antigua. It was previously known as the Airport Cricket Ground, before it was taken over by American businessman and cricket enthusiast Allen Stanford, rebuilt in 2004 and named the Stanford Cricket Ground. It was used as one of the many home grounds of the Leeward Islands and also hosted many Twenty20 matches, including both the 2006 and 2008 Stanford 20/20 tournaments and the 2008 Stanford Super Series. Stanford was convicted of fraud and multiple violations of US securities laws on 6 March 2012 and sentenced to 110 years in prison, and the stadium's name was changed to the Coolidge Cricket Ground in 2016–17 and it resumed staging cricket matches after an eight-year hiatus.

The stadium also hosted football matches for Antigua Barracuda FC of USL Pro from 2011 to 2012.

In February 2021, it was selected to host its first official International matches to be played by the West Indies Men's team during Sri Lanka tour of the West Indies. On 3 March 2021, Kieron Pollard became only the third player to hit six sixes in an over in international cricket, off the bowling of Akila Dananjaya.

This ground has hosted many matches of 2022 ICC Under-19 Cricket World Cup.
