= Nyeem Young =

West Indian cricketer (born 2000)

Personal information
- Born: 22 September 2000 (age 26); Barbados

Career statistics
Competition	FC	LA	T20
Matches	4	14	19
Runs scored	271	461	395
Batting average	19.35	25.61	30.38
100s/50s	0/1	0/2	0/0
Top score	80	75*	48
Balls bowled	534	505	261
Wickets	14	18	13
Bowling average	31.4	36.33	14.87
5 wickets in innings	0	1	0
10 wickets in match	0	0	0
Best bowling	3/17	5/49	3/5
Catches/stumpings	0/0	2/0	10/0
- Source: ESPNcricinfo, 7 January 2024

Nyeem Young (born 22 September 2000) is a West Indian cricketer. Young was named in the West Indies' squads for the 2018 Under-19 Cricket World Cup and the 2020 Under-19 Cricket World Cup. At the 2020 tournament, in the Group B match against England, Young became the first cricketer for the West Indies to score a fifty and take a five wicket haul in the same U19 match. For his performance, he was named the man of the match.

Following his performance in the Under-19 Cricket World Cup, he was signed by the Barbados Tridents to play in the Caribbean Premier League. He made his Twenty20 debut on 25 August 2020, for the Barbados Tridents in the 2020 Caribbean Premier League.

In March 2022, Young was called up to a white-ball training squad with the national team to prepare for international fixtures during 2022.

In April 2023, Young was named in West Indies Academy's squad for the 2023 Headley Weekes Tri-Series. He made his first-class debut for West Indies Academy on 19 April 2023, against Team Headley.
