= West Indies Academy =

Cricket team

Personnel
- Captain: Nyeem Young (first-class), Kirk McKenzie (List A)
- Coach: Ramesh Subasinghe

Team information
- Founded: 2019

History
- Super50 Cup wins: 1
- Headley Weekes wins: 1

The West Indies Academy, formerly known as West Indies Emerging Team is a cricket team, that plays first-class and List A cricket in the West Indian domestic circuit. The team has no geographical base, rather is made up of the emerging players and top youth performers in the Caribbean. They are currently captained by Nyeem Young, and coached by Andre Coley.

The team was formed in October 2019 to compete in the Super50 Cup for the first time. The first recorded match by the team was played on 7 November 2019, against Guyana in the 2019–20 Regional Super50. In December 2022, the Cricket West Indies (CWI) announced that the West Indies Academy would be one of the three teams to take part in the inaugural 2023 Headley Weekes Tri-Series. The team made their first-class debut on 19 April 2023, which they won by seven wickets against Team Headley. West Indies Academy scheduled to tour Ireland for the first time in June 2024 to play three List A and two First-class games against Emerging Ireland.

== Current squad ==
Name	National team	Notes
Nyeem Young	Barbados	Captain
Kevlon Anderson	Guyana	
Ackeem Auguste	Saint Lucia	
Joshua Bishop	Barbados	
Teddy Bishop	Grenada	
McKenny Clarke	Saint Lucia	
Rivaldo Clarke	Barbados	
Joshua James	Trinidad and Tobago	
Tevin Imlach	Guyana	
Johann Layne	Barbados	
Kirk McKenzie	Jamaica	
Ashmead Nedd	Guyana	
Kelvin Pitman	Antigua and Barbuda	
Keagan Simmons	Trinidad and Tobago	
Ramon Simmonds	Barbados	
Junior Sinclair	Guyana	
Kevin Wickham	Barbados	

== Seasons ==
=== Super50 Cup ===
Season	League standings								Notes	Ref
Season	P	W	L	T	A	NRR	Pts	Pos	Notes	Ref
2019–20	8	4	3	0	1	–0.200	18	2nd	Champions	
2022–23	6	1	5	0	0	–0.700	4	4th	Group stage	
2023–24	7	3	2	0	2	0.256	33	5th	Group stage	

== Honours ==
Tournament	No. of titles	Seasons
Super50 Cup	1	2019–20
Headley Weekes Tri-Series	1	2023
