= 2024–25 West Indies Championship =

Domestic first-class cricket tournament in the West Indies

- Dates: 29 January – 12 April 2025
- Administrator: Cricket West Indies
- Cricket format: First-class
- Tournament format: Single round-robin
- Champions: Guyana (14th title)
- Participants: 8
- Matches: 28
- Most runs: (Trinidad and Tobago) Jason Mohammed (679)
- Most wickets: (Trinidad and Tobago) Khary Pierre (41)

The 2024–25 West Indies Championship was the 57th edition of the West Indies Championship, the domestic first-class cricket competition played by the countries in the West Indies. The tournament began on 29 January and ended on 12 April 2025. Guyana Harpy Eagles were the defending champions. Guyana Harpy Eagles secured their third consecutive four-day title after a draw with Trinidad and Tobago Red Force on April 12.

== Squads ==
Barbados Pride	Combined Campuses and Colleges	Guyana Harpy Eagles	Jamaica Scorpions	Leeward Islands Hurricanes	Trinidad & Tobago Red Force	West Indies Academy	Windward Islands Volcanoes
Raymon Reifer (c); Leniko Boucher; Jonathan Drakes; Matthew Forde; Chaim Holder; Chemar Holder; Matthew Jones; Javed Leacock; Jair McAllister; Zachary McCaskie; Demetrius Richards; Ramon Simmonds; Kevin Wickham	Johann Jeremiah (c); Andre Bailey; Kyle Corbin; Damel Evelyn; Romario Greaves; Sadique Henry; Akeem Jordan; Avinash Mahabirsingh; Abhijai Mansingh; Kalvin Marcus; Shaqkere Parris; Demario Richards; Ojay Shields	Kemol Savory (c); Antony Adams; Ronaldo Alimohamed; Kevlon Anderson; Tagenarine Chanderpaul; Richie Looknauth; Thaddeus Lovell; Matthew Nandu; Veerasammy Permaul; Raymond Perez; Junior Sinclair; Nial Smith; Isai Thorne	John Campbell (c); Brad Barnes; Daniel Beckford; Jermaine Blackwood; Carlos Brown; Gordon Bryan; Javelle Glen; Odain McCatty; Kirk McKenzie; Marquino Mindley; Tamarie Redwood; Jeavor Royal; Odean Smith	Rahkeem Cornwall (c); Jewel Andrew; Colin Archibald; Daniel Doram; Shelton Forbes; Karima Gore; Joshua Grant; Jahmar Hamilton; Kadeem Henry; Chamiqueko Landerfort; Jeremiah Louis; Cameron Pennyfeather; Hayden Walsh Jr.	Bryan Charles (c); Yannic Cariah; Cephas Cooper; Antonio Gomez; Jyd Goolie; Joshua James; Justin Mannick; Vikash Mohan; Jason Mohammed; Khary Pierre; Aaidan Racha; Andrew Rambaran; Tion Webster	Teddy Bishop (c); Ackeem Auguste; Joshua Bishop; Jediah Blades; Carlon Bowen-Tuckett; McKenny Clarke; Rivaldo Clarke; Mavendra Dindyal; Nathan Edward; Justin Jaggessar; Johann Layne; Zishan Motara; Michael Palmer; Kelvin Pitman; Raneico Smith	Sunil Ambris (c); Jervin Benjamin; Keron Cottoy; Darel Cyrus; Kenneth Dember; Shadrack Descarte; Johnel Eugene; Kharmal Hamilton; Ryan John; Daurius Martin; Stephan Pascal; Jeremy Solozano; Gilon Tyson

== Points table ==
Pos	Team	Pld	W	L	T	D	NR	Pts	Quotient
1	Guyana Harpy Eagles	7	4	0	0	3	0	126.6	1.546
2	Barbados Pride	7	5	2	0	0	0	121.2	1.127
3	Trinidad and Tobago Red Force	7	4	1	0	2	0	111	1.569
4	Leeward Islands Hurricanes	7	3	2	0	2	0	98.5	1.055
5	Jamaica Scorpions	7	3	4	0	0	0	86.4	0.889
6	West Indies Academy	7	1	4	0	2	0	62	0.783
7	Combined Campuses and Colleges	7	1	4	0	2	0	58.4	0.698
8	Windward Islands Volcanoes	7	1	5	0	1	0	55	0.702

Source: ESPNcricinfo, Windies Cricket

Champions

=== Match summary ===
Each team's cumulative total points at the end of each round are listed.

Teams	Group matches							Total
Teams	1	2	3	4	5	6	7	Total
Guyana Harpy Eagles	23.2	45.2	57.6	81.2	102.6	111.6	126.6	126.6
Barbados Pride	5.4	28.6	50	73	78	100	121.2	121.2
Trinidad and Tobago Red Force	22.6	44.4	55.4	77.8	101	105.4	111	111
Leeward Islands Hurricanes	22.4	45.4	50.8	54.4	79.6	94.6	98.5	98.5
Jamaica Scorpions	22.4	29.4	33.2	35.6	59.8	82.8	86.4	86.4
West Indies Academy	3	4	12.8	19.8	25	39.2	62	62
Combined Campuses and Colleges	0.4	7.2	15.2	20.6	26.6	35	58.4	58.4
Windward Islands Volcanoes	4.6	5.6	16.8	42	45.8	51.6	55	55

Win	Loss	Draw	No result

== Fixtures ==
=== Round 1 ===
29 January–1 February 2025
Match 1
Scorecard

Barbados Pride	v	Guyana Harpy Eagles
346 (84.3 overs); Matthew Forde 82 (91); Richie Looknauth 4/69 (17 overs)		382 (101.5 overs); Kevlon Anderson 101 (157); Matthew Forde 5/69 (19.5 overs)
112 (41.4 overs); Raymon Reifer 37 (89); Richie Looknauth 5/23 (11.4 overs)		78/0 (28 overs); Tagenarine Chanderpaul 40* (93)

Guyana Harpy Eagles won by 10 wickets
Providence Stadium, Guyana
Umpires: Nigel Duguid and Lyndon Rajkumar

- Barbados Pride won the toss and elected to bat.
- Leniko Boucher, Matthew Forde (Barbados Pride) Anthony Adams and Richie Looknauth (Guyana Harpy Eagles) all made their first-class debuts.
- Points: Guyana Harpy Eagles 23.2, Barbados Pride 5.4.

29 January–1 February 2025 (D/N)
Match 2
Scorecard

Trinidad and Tobago Red Force	v	Combined Campuses and Colleges
504/6d (138.3 overs); Jason Mohammed 176 (276); Abhijai Mansingh 2/116 (24.3 overs)		222 (88.3 overs); Johann Jeremiah 60 (166); Yannic Cariah 3/26 (17 overs)
		207 (78.2 overs) (f/o); Damel Evelyn 57 (145); Khary Pierre 7/40 (24 overs)

Trinidad and Tobago Red Force won by an innings and 75 runs
Brian Lara Cricket Academy, Trinidad
Umpires: Zahid Bassarath and Christopher Taylor

- Combined Campuses and Colleges won the toss and elected to field.
- Antonio Gomez (Trinidad and Tobago Red Force) and Andre Bailey (Combined Campuses and Colleges) both made their first-class debuts.
- Points: Trinidad and Tobago Red Force 22.6, Combined Campuses and Colleges 0.4.

29 January–1 February 2025
Match 3
Scorecard

Leeward Islands Hurricanes	v	West Indies Academy
358 (102.3 overs); Jahmar Hamilton 81 (154); Joshua Bishop 7/85 (32 overs)		145 (39.3 overs); Carlon Bowen-Tuckett 34 (80); Cameron Pennyfeather 3/15 (6 overs)
289/9d (64.4 overs); Colin Archibald 61 (60; Joshua Bishop 3/89 (21 overs)		100 (34.5 overs); Justin Jagessar 26 (85); Hayden Walsh, Jr. 5/24 (6.5 overs)

Leeward Islands Hurricanes won by 402 runs
Coolidge Cricket Ground, Antigua
Umpires: Gregory Brathwaite and Christopher Wright

- West Indies Academy won the toss and elected to field.
- Mavendra Dindyal, Justin Jagessar, Michael Palmer (West Indies Academy) Shelton Forbes, Kadeem Henry and Cameron Pennyfeather (Leeward Islands Hurricanes) all made their first-class debuts.
- Points: Leeward Islands Hurricanes 22.4, West Indies Academy 3.

29 January–1 February 2025
Match 4
Scorecard

Jamaica Scorpions	v	Windward Islands Volcanoes
337 (96.4 overs); Jermaine Blackwood 109 (215); Darel Cyrus 2/26 (16 overs)		195 (56.4 overs); Ryan John 41 (96); Jermaine Blackwood 3/27 (8 overs)
277/7d (75.5 overs); Jermaine Blackwood 75 (109); Kenneth Dember 5/95 (33.5 overs)		241 (72.1 overs); Sunil Ambris 56 (60); Tamarie Redwood 7/72 (15.1 overs)

Jamaica Scorpions won by 178 runs
Arnos Vale Stadium, Saint Vincent
Umpires: Deighton Butler and Carl Tuckett

- Windward Islands Volcanoes won the toss and elected to field.
- Javelle Glen, Daniel Beckford and Tamarie Redwood (Jamaica Scorpions) all made their first-class debuts.
- Points: Jamaica Scorpions 22.4, Windward Islands Volcanoes 4.6.

=== Round 2 ===
5–8 February 2025
Match 5
Scorecard

Combined Campuses and Colleges	v	Guyana Harpy Eagles
375 (114.5 overs); Kyle Corbin 102 (204); Ronaldo Alimohamed 3/56 (24 overs)		343 (87.3 overs); Tevin Imlach 126* (239); Akeem Jordan 4/68 (23.3 overs)
132 (48.3 overs); Damel Evelyn 48 (129); Veerasammy Permaul 4/41 (23.3 overs)		168/2 (46.3 overs); Tevin Imlach 80 (125); Akeem Jordan 1/30 (10 overs)

Guyana Harpy Eagles won by 8 wickets
Providence Stadium, Guyana
Umpires: Patrick Gustard and Imran Moakhan

- Guyana Harpy Eagles won the toss and elected to field.
- Points: Guyana Harpy Eagles 22, Combined Campuses and Colleges 6.8.

5–8 February 2025 (D/N)
Match 6
Scorecard

Barbados Pride	v	West Indies Academy
581/9d (138.3 overs); Kraigg Brathwaite 212 (335); Johann Layne 4/85 (25 overs)		239 (64.5 overs); Rivaldo Clarke 78 (115); Chaim Holder 6/70 (16 overs)
		288 (86.3 overs) (f/o); Carlon Bowen-Tuckett 103* (158); Ramon Simmonds 4/43 (12 overs)

Barbados Pride won by an innings and 54 runs
Kensington Oval, Barbados
Umpires: Jacqueline Williams and Christopher Wright

- Barbados Pride won the toss and elected to bat.
- Points: Barbados Pride 23.2, West Indies Academy 1.

5–8 February 2025 (D/N)
Match 7
Scorecard

Windward Islands Volcanoes	v	Trinidad and Tobago Red Force
166 (51.1 overs); Kavem Hodge 126 (142); Khary Pierre 4/17 (8.1 overs)		456 (132.5 overs); Cephas Cooper 117 (225); Darel Cyrus 4/105 (38.5 overs)
114 (35.4 overs); Jeremy Solozano 36 (75); Khary Pierre 8/27 (11.4 overs)

Trinidad and Tobago Red Force won by an innings and 176 runs
Arnos Vale Stadium, Saint Vincent
Umpires: Deighton Butler and Shannon Crawford

- Windward Islands Volcanoes won the toss and elected to bat.
- Points: Trinidad and Tobago Red Force 21.8, Windward Islands Volcanoes 1.

5–8 February 2025
Match 8
Scorecard

Jamaica Scorpions	v	Leeward Island Hurricanes
320 (94.4 overs); John Campbell 126 (150); Jeremiah Louis 3/44 (16 overs)		335 (87.4 overs); Jahmar Hamilton 93 (126); Marquino Mindley 4/44 (20 overs)
170 (58.5 overs); John Campbell 53 (96); Oshane Thomas 3/44 (10 overs)		156/5 (41 overs); Jewel Andrew 62* (81); Marquino Mindley 2/32 (9 overs)

Leeward Islands Hurricanes won by 5 wickets
Sir Vivian Richards Stadium, Antigua
Umpires: Ryan Banwarie and Gregory Brathwaite

- Leeward Island Hurricanes won the toss and elected to field.
- Points: Leeward Islands Hurricanes 23, Jamaica Scorpions 7.

=== Round 3 ===
12–15 February 2025 (D/N)
Match 9
Scorecard

Guyana Harpy Eagles	v	West Indies Academy
253 (63.1 overs); Ronaldo Alimohamed 66 (71); Jediah Blades 4/37 (15 overs)		249 (83.2 overs); Joshua Bishop 54 (47); Veerasammy Permaul 6/79 (29 overs)
44/4 (8 overs); Kevin Sinclair 24 (14); Johann Layne 2/6 (2 overs)

Match drawn
Providence Stadium, Guyana
Umpires: Ryan Banwarie and Zahid Bassarath

- Guyana Harpy Eagles won the toss and elected to bat.
- Thaddeus Lovell (Guyana Harpy Eagles) made his first-class debut.
- Points: Guyana Harpy Eagles 12.4, West Indies Academy 8.8.

12–15 February 2025
Match 10
Scorecard

Combined Campuses and Colleges	v	Windward Islands Volcanoes
216 (71.3 overs); Damel Evelyn 53 (155); Darel Cyrus 5/71 (27.3 overs)		248 (77.5 overs); Kenneth Dember 49 (88); Akeem Jordan 5/52 (23 overs)
60/0 (22 overs); Damel Evelyn 37* (68)

Match drawn
Windsor Park, Dominica
Umpires: Patrick Gustard and Christopher Taylor

- Combined Campuses and Colleges won the toss and elected to bat.
- Points: Windward Islands Volcanoes 11.2, Combined Campuses and Colleges 8.

12–15 February 2025
Match 11
Scorecard

Jamaica Scorpions	v	Barbados Pride
231 (67.5 overs); Odean Smith 50 (42); Chaim Holder 3/66 (11 overs)		293 (86.4 overs); Jonathan Drakes 108 (202); Brad Barnes 6/94 (24.4 overs)
180 (54.2 overs); Javelle Glen 66 (109); Jomel Warrican 3/42 (11.2 overs)		121/1 (33.5 overs); Jonathan Drakes 52* (99); Odean Smith 1/24 (7 overs)

Barbados Pride won by 9 wickets
Kensington Oval, Barbados
Umpires: Shannon Crawford and Nigel Duguid

- Barbados Pride won the toss and elected to field.
- Points: Barbados Pride 21.4, Jamaica Scorpions 3.8.

12–15 February 2025
Match 12
Scorecard

Trinidad and Tobago Red Force	v	Leeward Islands Hurricanes
529/5d (125 overs); Jason Mohammed 204* (298); Rahkeem Cornwall 3/127 (36 overs)		433 (153.3 overs); Mikyle Louis 110 (210); Khary Pierre 5/93 (54.3 overs)
191/3 (40.5 overs); Joshua Da Silva 100* (108); Alzarri Joseph 2/36 (7 overs)

Match drawn
Warner Park Sporting Complex, Saint Kitts
Umpires: Carl Tuckett and Jacqueline Williams

- Trinidad and Tobago Red Force won the toss and elected to bat.
- Points: Trinidad and Tobago Red Force 11, Leeward Islands Hurricanes 5.4.

=== Round 4 ===
5–8 March 2025 (D/N)
Match 13
Scorecard

Guyana Harpy Eagles	v	Jamaica Scorpions
339 (109.2 overs); Kevlon Anderson 116 (187); Odean Smith 5/68 (22.2 overs)		44 (25.5 overs); Javelle Glen 5 (12); Ronaldo Alimohamed 6/17 (11.5 overs)
193/3d (69.3 overs); Tagenarine Chanderpaul 74 (127); Marquino Mindley 1/13 (5 overs)		274 (85 overs); Kirk McKenzie 147 (249); Gudakesh Motie 4/69 (25 overs)

Guyana Harpy Eagles won by 214 runs
Sabina Park, Jamaica
Umpires: Christopher Taylor and Carl Tuckett

- Guyana Harpy Eagles won the toss and elected to bat.
- Points: Guyana Harpy Eagles 23.6, Jamaica Scorpions 2.4.

5–8 March 2025
Match 14
Scorecard

Windward Islands Volcanoes	v	Leeward Islands Hurricanes
480 (116.3 overs); Shadrack Descarte 119 (188); Oshane Thomas 4/66 (21 overs)		195 (51.1 overs); Mikyle Louis 84 (152); Gilon Tyson 5/45 (13 overs)
		225 (61.2 overs) (f/o); Justin Greaves 67 (113); Shadrack Descarte 3/58 (14 overs)

Windward Islands Volcanoes won by an innings and 60 runs
Daren Sammy Cricket Ground, Saint Lucia
Umpires: Deighton Butler and Shannon Crawford

- Leeward Islands Hurricanes won the toss and elected to field.
- Points: Windward Islands Volcanoes 25.2, Leeward Islands Hurricanes 3.6.

5–8 March 2025
Match 15
Scorecard

Trinidad and Tobago Red Force	v	West Indies Academy
304 (89.4 overs); Joshua Da Silva 120 (189); Johann Layne 5/56 (25 overs)		268 (61.1 overs); Joshua Bishop 102 (81); Yannic Cariah 3/27 (6 overs)
241 (67.4 overs); Cephas Cooper 55 (94); Kelvin Pitman 4/48 (17 overs)		152 (38.3 overs); Ackeem Auguste 30 (64); Bryan Charles 6/47 (13.3 overs)

Trinidad and Tobago Red Force won by 125 runs
Coolidge Cricket Ground, Antigua
Umpires: Nigel Duguid and Christopher Wright

- West Indies Academy won the toss and elected to field.
- Nathan Edward (West Indies Academy) made his first-class debut.
- Points: Trinidad and Tobago Red Force 22.4, West Indies Academy 7.

5–8 March 2025
Match 16
Scorecard

Combined Campuses and Colleges	v	Barbados Pride
262 (81.1 overs); Damel Evelyn 110 (202); Roston Chase 5/70 (18.1 overs)		428 (90.4 overs); Roston Chase 122 (123); Kalvin Marcus 3/81 (16 overs)
193 (56.1 overs); Akeem Jordan 50 (45); Jomel Warrican 5/59 (16.1 overs)		28/0 (4.4 overs); Kraigg Brathwaite 15* (16)

Barbados Pride won by 10 wickets
Kensington Oval, Barbados
Umpires: Lyndon Rajkumar and Leslie Reifer

- Combined Campuses and Colleges won the toss and elected to bat.
- Damion Joachim (Combined Campuses and Colleges) made his first-class debut.
- Points: Barbados Pride 23, Combined Campuses and Colleges 5.4.

=== Round 5 ===
12 – 15 March 2025
Match 17
Scorecard

Windward Islands Volcanoes	v	Guyana Harpy Eagles
213 (61.5 overs); Jeremy Solozano 83 (142); Veerasammy Permaul 4/55 (16 overs)		324 (83.2 overs); Tevin Imlach 113 (201); Gilon Tyson 3/51 (13.2 overs)
135 (47.5 overs); Kavem Hodge 40 (70); Gudakesh Motie 6/38 (20.5 overs)		28/0 (4.3 overs); Matthew Nandu 18* (14)

Guyana Harpy Eagles won by 10 wickets
Providence Stadium, Guyana
Umpires: Gregory Brathwaite and Javed Persaud

- Windward Islands Volcanoes won the toss and elected to bat.
- Points: Guyana Harpy Eagles 21.4, Windward Islands Volcanoes 3.8.

12 – 15 March 2025
Match 18
Scorecard

Jamaica Scorpions	v	West Indies Academy
375 (92.2 overs); John Campbell 101 (126); Jediah Blades 4/64 (20 overs)		211 (46.5 overs); Carlon Bowen-Tuckett 57 (100); Brad Barnes 3/25 (6 overs)
191 (53.4 overs); Brandon King 77 (115); Joshua Bishop 5/35 (15 overs)		315 (78 overs); Ackeem Auguste 77 (108); Marquino Mindley 3/46 (13 overs)

Jamaica Scorpions won by 40 runs
Coolidge Cricket Ground, Antigua
Umpires: Zahid Bassarath and Nigel Duguid

- Jamaica Scorpions won the toss and elected to bat.
- Points: Jamaica Scorpions 24.2, West Indies Academy 5.2

12 – 15 March 2025 (D/N)
Match 19
Scorecard

Leeward Islands Hurricanes	v	Combined Campuses and Colleges
425 (98.5 overs); Jewel Andrew 122 (139); Chemar Holder 5/107 (26.5 overs)		170/9d (44 overs); Romario Greaves 39 (62); Alzarri Joseph 6/35 (17 overs)
249/7d (53 overs); Jewel Andrew 65 (58); Akeem Jordan 3/50 (15 overs)		131 (43.1 overs); Kyle Corbin 58* (72); Oshane Thomas 5/36 (13.1 overs)

Leeward Islands Hurricanes won by 373 runs
Sir Vivian Richards Stadium, Antigua
Umpires: Christopher Taylor and Christopher Wright

- Leeward Islands Hurricanes won the toss and elected to bat.
- Daniel Williams (Combined Campuses and Colleges) made his first-class debut.
- Points: Leeward Islands Hurricanes 25.2, Combined Campuses and Colleges 6.

12 – 15 March 2025
Match 20
Scorecard

Barbados Pride	v	Trinidad and Tobago Red Force
86 (26.2 overs); Kemar Roach 21 (39); Anderson Phillip 4/36 (10.2 overs)		263 (83.4 overs); Kamil Pooran 60 (83); Jason Holder 5/52 (22.4 overs)
121 (45.4 overs); Roston Chase 41 (79); Joshua James 3/16 (12 overs)

Trinidad and Tobago Red Force won by an innings and 56 runs
Kensington Oval, Barbados
Umpires: Ryan Banwarie and Leslie Reifer

- Trinidad and Tobago Red Force won the toss and elected to field.
- Points: Trinidad and Tobago Red Force 23.2, Barbados Pride 5.

=== Round 6 ===
2–5 April 2025 (D/N)
Match 21
Scorecard

Guyana Harpy Eagles	v	Leeward Islands Hurricanes
193 (44.4 overs); Kevlon Anderson 77* (96); Rahkeem Cornwall 3/25 (4.4 overs)		335 (79.3 overs); Keacy Carty 92 (182); Ronaldo Alimohamed 5/91 (19.3 overs)
490/9d (160.1 overs); Tevin Imlach 123 (238); Javier Spencer 5/77 (25 overs)		147/3 (50 overs); Mikyle Louis 61 (101); Veerasammy Permaul 2/27 (18 overs)

Match drawn
Warner Park Sporting Complex, Basseterre, St Kitts
Umpires: Cory Black and Patrick Gustard

- Guyana Harpy Eagles won the toss and elected to bat.
- Points: Leeward Islands Hurricanes 15, Guyana Harpy Eagles 9.

2–5 April 2025
Match 22
Scorecard

Jamaica Scorpions	v	Trinidad and Tobago Red Force
372 (111.5 overs); Javelle Glen 140* (234); Joshua James 3/40 (16 overs)		171 (44.2 overs); Joshua Da Silva 86 (119); Marquino Mindley 3/37 (11 overs)
187 (57.2 overs); Brandon King 89 (142); Bryan Charles 4/82 (15.2 overs)		165 (37 overs); Bryan Charles 28 (31); Brad Barnes 4/19 (7 overs)

Jamaica Scorpions won by 223 runs
Brian Lara Cricket Academy, Trinidad
Umpires: Shannon Crawford and Lyndon Rajkumar

- Trinidad and Tobago Red Force won the toss and elected to field.
- Points: Jamaica Scorpions 23, Trinidad and Tobago Red Force 4.4.

2–5 April 2025
Match 23
Scorecard

Windward Islands Volcanoes	v	Barbados Pride
186 (49.3 overs); Sunil Ambris 110 (116); Matthew Forde 2/19 (7 overs)		198 (54.5 overs); Matthew Forde 43 (54); Keon Gaston 6/52 (12.5 overs)
316 (89.1 overs); Kavem Hodge 99 (212); Ramon Simmonds 4/47 (15 overs)		307/8 (77.1 overs); Shayne Moseley 109 (215); Kenneth Dember 4/95 (24.1 overs)

Barbados Pride won by 2 wickets
Daren Sammy Cricket Ground, Saint Lucia
Umpires: Ryan Banwarie and Zahid Bassarath

- Windward Islands Volcanoes won the toss and elected to bat.
- Keon Gaston and Noelle David Leo (Windward Islands Volcanoes) both made their first-class debut.
- Points: Barbados Pride 22, Windward Islands Volcanoes 5.8.

2–5 April 2025
Match 24
Scorecard

Combined Campuses and Colleges	v	West Indies Academy
238 (79 overs); Shaqkere Parris 52 (95); Joshua Bishop 6/78 (33 overs)		316 (79.2 overs); Teddy Bishop 99 (140); Chemar Holder 4/81 (18.2 overs)
395/8d (108 overs); Johann Jeremiah 107 (131); Kelvin Pitman 3/70 (20 overs)		6/1 (3.2 overs); Ackeem Auguste 4 (10); Akeem Jordan 1/1 (1.2 overs)

Match drawn
Sir Frank Worrell Memorial Ground, Trinidad
Umpires: Kellman Kowlessar and Leslie Reifer

- Combined Campuses and Colleges won the toss and elected to bat.
- Jaden Edmund (Combined Campuses and Colleges) made his first-class career.
- Points: West Indies Academy 14.2, Combined Campuses and Colleges 8.4.

=== Round 7 ===
9–12 April 2025
Match 25
Scorecard

Trinidad and Tobago Red Force	v	Guyana Harpy Eagles
240 (86.5 overs); Jyd Goolie 58 (164); Nial Smith 4/49 (12 overs)		463 (132.3 overs); Keemo Paul 93 (126); Khary Pierre 4/119 (44 overs)
370/9d (98 overs); Jason Mohammed 125 (186); Ashmead Nedd 4/105 (30 overs)		33/0 (10 overs); Raymond Perez 26* (35)

Match drawn
Queen's Park Oval, Trinidad
Umpires: Kashif Sandy and Christopher Taylor

- Guyana Harpy Eagles won the toss and elected to field.
- Points: Guyana Harpy Eagles 15, Trinidad & Tobago Red Force 5.6

9–12 April 2025 (D/N)
Match 26
Scorecard

Leeward Islands Hurricanes	v	Barbados Pride
444/9d (133.4 overs); Justin Greaves 124* (261); Jomel Warrican 7/111 (38.4 overs)		315 (73.2 overs); Matthew Forde 120 (146); Justin Greaves 3/36 (15 overs)
99 (43.4 overs); Keacy Carty 37 (76); Ramon Simmonds 6/27 (14 overs)		233/7 (76.5 overs); Kyle Mayers 45 (86); Rahkeem Cornwall 3/32 (14 overs)

Barbados Pride won by 3 wickets
Warner Park Sporting Complex, Saint Kitts
Umpires: Patrick Gustard and Jacqueline Williams

- Barbados Pride won the toss and elected to field.
- Points: Barbados Pride 21.2, Leeward Islands Hurricanes 3.9

9–12 April 2025
Match 27
Scorecard

Jamaica Scorpions	v	Combined Campuses and Colleges
133 (36.2 overs); Kirk McKenzie 31 (54); Jaden Edmund 5/59 (11 overs)		327 (86.3 overs); Shaqkere Parris 112 (179); Abhijai Mansingh 5/91 (18.3 overs)
342 (75.2 overs); John Campbell 104 (112); Larry Edwards 5/86 (22 overs)		153/5 (38.3 overs); Shaqkere Parris 85 (87); Marquino Mindley 2/30 (8 overs)

Combined Campuses and Colleges won by 5 wickets
Arnos Vale Stadium, St. Vincent
Umpires: Deighton Butler and Lyndon Rajkumar

- Combined Campuses and Colleges won the toss and elected to field.
- Points: Combined Campuses and Colleges 23.4, Jamaica Scorpions 3.6

9 – 12 April 2025
Match 28
Scorecard

Windward Islands Volcanoes	v	West Indies Academy
106 (25 overs); Noelle David Leo 22 (26); Joshua Bishop 3/15 (4 overs)		253 (66 overs); Teddy Bishop 56 (75); Kenneth Dember 6/45 (15 overs)
181 (46.1 overs); Alick Athanaze 41 (57); Johann Layne 6/30 (13.1 overs)		35/0 (3.3 overs); Ackeem Auguste 33 (17)

West Indies Academy won by 10 wickets
Sir Vivian Richards Stadium, Antigua
Umpires: Cory Black and Gregory Brathwaite

- West Indies Academy won the toss and elected to field.
- Johnnel Eugene (Windward Islands Volcanoes) made his first-class debut.
- Points: West Indies Academy 22.8, Windward Islands Volcanoes 3.4.

== Statistics ==
=== Most runs ===
Runs	Player	Team	Mat	Inns	HS	Ave	SR
679	Jason Mohammed	Trinidad and Tobago Red Force	7	10	204*	75.44	60.89
583	Joshua Da Silva	Trinidad and Tobago Red Force	6	10	152	64.77	71.44
573	Kevlon Anderson	Guyana Harpy Eagles	7	11	116	71.62	61.48
573	Jahmar Hamilton	Leeward Islands Hurricanes	7	13	93	57.30	64.67
546	Shaqkere Parris	Combined Campuses and Colleges	7	13	112	45.50	61.21
Source: ESPNCricinfo

=== Most wickets ===
Wkts	Player	Team	Mat	Inns	BBI	Ave	Eco
41	Khary Pierre	Trinidad and Tobago Red Force	7	11	8/27	13.56	2.37
33	Joshua Bishop	West Indies Academy	7	12	7/85	25.72	3.32
32	Jomel Warrican	Barbados Pride	6	11	7/111	18.37	3.08
32	Veerasammy Permaul	Guyana Harpy Eagles	7	12	6/75	22.34	2.74
28	Ronaldo Alimohamed	Guyana Harpy Eagles	7	13	6/17	16.85	3.18
Source: ESPNCricinfo
