= 2026 West Indies Championship =

Domestic first-class cricket tournament in the West Indies

- Dates: 12 April – 20 May 2026
- Administrator: Cricket West Indies
- Cricket format: First-class
- Tournament format(s): 3 Bilateral series each and knockout
- Champions: Trinidad and Tobago Red Force (6th title)
- Participants: 6
- Matches: 12
- Most runs: (Trinidad and Tobago) Joshua Da Silva (413)
- Most wickets: (Guyana) Gudakesh Motie (27)

The 2025–26 West Indies Championship was the 58th edition of the West Indies Championship, the domestic first-class cricket competition played by the 6 core members of the West Indies. The tournament began on 12 April and ended on 20 May 2026. Guyana Harpy Eagles were the defending champions, having secured their third consecutive four-day title after a draw with Trinidad and Tobago Red Force in their final match of the previous season.

== Format ==
Under the new revised structure, the 4-day first-class tournament featured three concurrent, three-match bilateral series played across the region, with the traditional West Indies Championship points system being utilised. The six regional franchises seeded 1–6 based on their final standings at the end of the 2025 edition of the tournament. The winners of each bilateral contest ranked 1st to 3rd based on total points accumulated, with the top-ranked team advancing directly to the final. During the playoff round, the 1st-placed team played against West Indies Academy to maintain match readiness and ensure fairness of preparation ahead of the final, while the 2nd- and 3rd-ranked teams met in a playoff match to determine the second finalist.

== Squads ==
Barbados Pride	Guyana Harpy Eagles	Jamaica Scorpions	Leeward Islands Hurricanes	Trinidad and Tobago Red Force	West Indies Academy	Windward Islands Volcanoes
Kraigg Brathwaite (c); Joshua Bishop; Jediah Blades; Leniko Boucher; Shian Brathwaite; Jonathan Drakes; Johann Layne; Kyle Mayers; Jair McAllister; Shayne Moseley; Ramon Simmonds; Shamar Springer; Jomel Warrican; Kevin Wickham	Tevin Imlach (c); Matthew Nandu (vc); Kevlon Anderson; Tagenarine Chanderpaul; Richie Looknauth; Gudakesh Motie; Keemo Paul; Raymond Perez; Veerasammy Permaul; Zeynul Ramsammy; Kemol Savory; Nial Smith; Isai Thorne; Jonathan van Lange	John Campbell (c); Brad Barnes; Carlos Brown; Javelle Glen; Brandon King; Abhijai Mansingh; Kirk McKenzie; Marquino Mindley; Romaine Morris; Jeavor Royal; Pete Salmon; Ojay Shields; Odean Smith	Justin Greaves (c); Jewel Andrew; Keacy Carty; Rahkeem Cornwall; Daniel Doram; Nathan Edward; Karima Gore; Jahmar Hamilton; Kadeem Henry; Jeremiah Louis; Mikyle Louis; Kelvin Pitman; Oshane Thomas	Joshua Da Silva (c); Cephas Cooper; Jason Mohammed; Jyd Goolie; Amir Jangoo; Yannic Cariah; Evin Lewis; Bryan Charles; Jayden Seales; Terrance Hinds; Anderson Phillip; Joshua James; Khary Pierre	Rivaldo Clarke (c); Ryan Bandoo; Carlon Bowen-Tuckett; Giovonte Depeiza; Mavendra Dindyal; Nathan Edward; Damel Evelyn; Amari Goodridge; Mbeki Joseph; Zishan Motara; Shaqkere Parris; Jakeem Pollard; Kelvin Pitman; Reneico Smith	Alick Athanaze (c); Teddy Bishop; Sunil Ambris; Darel Cyrus; Kenneth Dember; Shadrack Descarte; Stephan Pascal; Noelle Leo; Ackeem Auguste; Kavem Hodge; Ryan John; Gilon Tyson; Darron Nedd

== Points table ==
Pos	Team	Pld	W	L	D	Pts	QUO	Qualification
1	Guyana Harpy Eagles	3	3	0	0	63.8	1.799	Advanced to the Final
2	Trinidad and Tobago Red Force	3	1	0	2	53.6	3.318	Advanced to the Playoffs
3	Barbados Pride	3	1	1	1	42.2	1.103	Advanced to the Playoffs
4	Jamaica Scorpions	3	1	1	1	34	0.906	
5	Leeward Islands Hurricanes	3	0	1	2	18.4	0.301	
6	Windward Islands Volcanoes	3	0	3	0	13.2	0.556	

Source: ESPNCricinfo, Windies Cricket

== Bilateral series ==
=== Windward v Guyana ===
12–15 April 2026
Match 1
Scorecard

Windward Islands Volcanoes	v	Guyana Harpy Eagles
286 (86.1 overs); Ackeem Auguste 95 (177); Gudakesh Motie 6/73 (23.1 overs)		264 (88.3 over); Kemol Savory 77 (153); Gilon Tyson 5/69 (221.3 overs)
209 (65 overs); Sunil Ambris 107 (176); Gudakesh Motie 4/46 (19 overs)		233/6 (78.4 overs); Tevin Imlach 82 (147); Ryan John 2/48 (19 overs)

Guyana Harpy Eagles won by 4 wickets
Sir Vivian Richards Stadium, North Sound, Antigua
Umpires: Zahid Bassarath and Deighton Butler

- Guyana Harpy Eagles won the toss and elected to field.
- Darron Nedd (Windward Islands Volcanoes) made his first-class debut.
- Tevin Imlach (Guyana Harpy Eagles) scored his 2,000th run in first-class cricket.
- Points: Guyana Harpy Eagles 21.4, Windward Islands Volcanoes 5.8.

19–22 April 2026
Match 2
Scorecard

Windward Islands Volcanoes	v	Guyana Harpy Eagles
151 (37.1 overs); Ryan John 37 (51); Nial Smith 5/36 (13 overs)		491 (157.1 overs); Veerasammy Permaul 82 (150); Kenneth Dember 4/113 (40 overs)
199 (48.3 overs); Ackeem Auguste 91 (139); Gudakesh Motie 5/51 (12 overs)

Guyana Harpy Eagles won by an innings and 141 runs
Antigua Recreation Ground, Antigua
Umpires: Deighton Butler and Carl Tuckett

- Guyana Harpy Eagles won the toss and elected to field.
- Stephan Pascal replaced Alick Athanaze as an injury substitute for Windward Islands Volcanoes.
- The match was scheduled for four days but was completed in three.
- Points: Guyana Harpy Eagles 21.8, Windward Islands Volcanoes 1.8.

26–29 April 2026
Match 3
Scorecard

Guyana Harpy Eagles	v	Windward Islands Volcanoes
242 (79.5 overs); Tagenarine Chanderpaul 69 (212); Ryan John 4/28 (16 overs)		223 (71.3 overs); Kavem Hodge 74 (115); Gudakesh Motie 4/52 (19.3 overs)
299 (99.1 overs); Tagenarine Chanderpaul 117* (297); Kenneth Dember 3/52 (23 overs)		225 (68 overs); Alick Athanaze 64 (116); Gudakesh Motie 4/82 (19 overs)

Guyana Harpy Eagles won by 93 runs
Coolidge Cricket Ground, Antigua
Umpires: Zahid Bassarath and Carl Tuckett

- Windward Islands Volcanoes won the toss and elected to field.

=== Barbados v Jamaica ===
12–15 April 2026
Match 1
Scorecard

Barbados Pride	v	Jamaica Scorpions
348 (81.4 overs); Kevin Wickham 153 (193); Marquino Mindley 4/32 (15 overs)		342 (112.4 overs); Carlos Brown 61 (141); Jomel Warrican 5/71 (31 overs)
317/8d (84.2 overs); Kevin Wickham 108* (115); Marquino Mindley 3/48 (14.2 overs)		326/3 (61 overs); Kirk McKenzie 135* (180); Jair McAllister 1/41 (8 overs)

Jamaica Scorpions won by 7 wickets
Chedwin Park, Jamaica
Umpires: Patrick Gustard and Chris Wright

- Barbados Pride won the toss and elected to bat.
- John Campbell (Jamaica Scorpions) scored his 6,000th run in first-class cricket.
- Points: Jamaica Scorpions 22, Barbados Pride 5.

19–22 April 2026
Match 2
Scorecard

Jamaica Scorpions	v	Barbados Pride
457 (103 overs); Kirk McKenzie 114 (146); Shamar Springer 3/99 (24 overs)		626/8d (154.3 overs); Kraigg Brathwaite 176 (343); Pete Salmon 4/137 (39 overs)
90/4 (39.3 overs); John Campbelll 42* (91); Johann Layne 2/15 (6 overs)

Match drawn
Sabina Park, Jamaica
Umpires: Christopher Taylor and Jacqueline Williams

- Jamaica Scorpions won the toss and elected to bat.
- Points: Barbados Pride 14.8, Jamaica Scorpions 7.6.

26–29 April 2026
Match 3
Scorecard

Barbados Pride	v	Jamaica Scorpions
439 (112 overs); Jonathan Drakes 94 (148); Marquino Mindley 3/62 (20 overs)		142 (51 overs); John Campbell 36 (57); Roston Chase 5/28 (12 overs)
		286 (70.4 overs) (f/o); Brandon King 63 (144); Joshua Bishop 5/72 (20.4 overs)

Barbados Pride won by an innings and 11 runs
Sabina Park, Jamaica
Umpires: Colin Bryan and Christopher Taylor

- Barbados Pride won the toss and elected to bat.
- Khari Campbell (Jamaica Scorpions) made his first-class debut.
- The match was scheduled for four days but was completed in three.

=== Leeward v Trinidad & Tobago ===
12–15 April 2026
Scorecard

Leeward Islands Hurricanes	v	Trinidad and Tobago Red Force
138 (60.5 overs); Jahmar Hamilton 44 (86); Bryan Charles 3/9 (5.5 overs)		507/d (145 overs); Amir Jangoo 203* (287); Oshane Thomas 3/98 (21 overs)
98 (52.3 overs); Justin Greaves 56 (128); Khary Pierre 4/37 (20 overs)

Trinidad and Tobago Red Force won by an innings and 271 runs
Coolidge Cricket Ground, Antigua
Umpires: Leslie Reifer and Carl Tuckett

- Trinidad and Tobago Red Force won the toss and elected to field.
- The match was scheduled for four days but was completed in three.
- Points: Trinidad and Tobago Red Force 22.6, Leeward Islands Hurricanes 1.8.

19–22 April 2026
Match 2
Scorecard

Leeward Islands Hurricanes	v	Trinidad and Tobago Red Force
131 (39.3 overs); Karima Gore 57 (90); Anderson Phillip 6/38 (16 overs)		175 (60 overs); Jyd Goolie 51* (95); Kelvin Pitman 6/52 (20 overs)
140/7 (47.3 overs); Mikyle Louis 73 (129); Jayden Seales 7/34 (17.3 overs)

Match drawn
Sir Vivian Richards Stadium, North Sound, Antigua
Umpires: Zahid Bassarath and Leslie Reifer

- Trinidad and Tobago Red Force won the toss and elected to field.
- The match was abandoned as a draw during the first session of day 3 due to a dangerous pitch.
- The match was scheduled for four days but was completed in three.
- Points: Trinidad and Tobago Red Force 14.4, Leeward Islands Hurricanes 9.

26–29 April 2026
Match 3
Scorecard

Trinidad and Tobago Red Force	v	Leeward Islands Hurricanes
522/9d (134.3 overs); Joshua Da Silva 220 (304); Karima Gore 4/86 (22.3 overs)		345 (72.2 overs); Jahmar Hamilton 121 (119); Anderson Phillip 4/92 (16.2 overs)
		467/7 (122 overs) (f/o); Keacy Carty 147 (212); Anderson Phillip 4/89 (21 overs)

Match drawn
Antigua Recreation Ground, Antigua
Umpires: Deighton Butler and Leslie Reifer

- Leeward Islands Hurricanes won the toss and elected to field.

== Knockout stage ==
=== Bracket ===
Playoffs
2	Trinidad and Tobago Red Force	333 (111.2 ov) & 280 (97.4 ov)
3	Barbados Pride	296 (76.4 ov) & 177 (48.3 ov)

Final
1	Guyana Harpy Eagles	247 (69.4 ov) & 139 (35 ov)
PW	Trinidad and Tobago Red Force	260 (73.5 ov) & 267 (85 ov)
Playoffs
#	West Indies Academy	485 (101.3 ov) & 157 (42 ov)
1	Guyana Harpy Eagles	663 (160.3 ov)

=== Playoffs ===
10–13 May 2026
Scorecard

West Indies Academy	v	Guyana Harpy Eagles
485 (101.3 overs); Rivaldo Clarke 180 (228); Richie Looknauth 3/86 (18 overs)		663 (160.3 overs); Matthew Nandu 237 (361); Zishan Motara 6/202 (46 overs)
157 (42 overs); Mavendra Dindiyal 41 (55); Richie Looknauth 6/36 (12 overs)

Guyana Harpy Eagles won by an innings and 21 runs
Antigua Recreation Ground, Antigua
Umpires: Felix Auguiste and Gregory Brathwaite

- West Indies Academy won the toss and elected to bat.

10–13 May 2026
Scorecard

Trinidad and Tobago Red Force	v	Barbados Pride
333 (111.2 overs); Cephas Cooper 93 (161); Shamar Springer 3/40 (19 overs)		296 (76.4 overs); Joshua Bishop 99* (147); Anderson Phillip 4/63 (17 overs)
280 (97.4 overs); Cephas Cooper 102 (196); Joshua Bishop 6/87 (26.4 overs)		177 (48.3 overs); Shayne Moseley 39 (56); Khary Pierre 5/54 (19 overs)

Trinidad and Tobago Red Force won by 140 runs
Coolidge Cricket Ground, Antigua
Umpires: Deighton Butler and Carl Tuckett

- Trinidad and Tobago Red Force won the toss and elected to bat.

=== Final ===
17–20 May 2026
Scorecard

Trinidad and Tobago Red Force	v	Guyana Harpy Eagles
260 (62 overs); Jayden Seales 70* (100); Keemo Paul 3/28 (17.4 overs)		247 (69.4 overs); Jonathan van Lange 50 (67); Jayden Seales 4/56 (19 overs)
267 (85 overs); Evin Lewis 122 (252); Veerasammy Permaul 4/14 (10 overs)		139 (35 overs); Kevlon Anderson 41 (68); Jayden Seales 3/39 (11 overs)

Trinidad and Tobago win by 141 runs
Sir Vivian Richards Stadium, Antigua
Umpires: Deighton Butler and Carl Tuckett
Player of the match: Jayden Seales

- Guyana Harpy Eagles won the toss and elected to field.
- Jonathan van Lange (Guyana Harpy Eagles) made his first-class debut.
