= 2024–25 Super50 Cup =

Cricket tournament

2024 Super50 Cup
- Dates: 29 October – 23 November 2024
- Administrator: Cricket West Indies
- Cricket format: List A (50 overs)
- Tournament format(s): Group stage and knockout
- Host: Trinidad and Tobago
- Champions: None (Both teams forfeited)
- Participants: 8
- Matches: 31
- Most runs: (Trinidad and Tobago) Amir Jangoo (446)
- Most wickets: (Antigua and Barbuda) Rahkeem Cornwall (23)

The 2024–25 Super50 Cup was the 50th edition of the Super50 Cup, the domestic limited-overs cricket competition for the countries of the Cricket West Indies (CWI). The tournament began on the 29 October and the final was scheduled to be played on the 23 November 2024 in Trinidad and Tobago.

The tournament consisted of eight teams: Barbados Pride, Guyana Harpy Eagles, Jamaica Scorpions, the Leeward Islands Hurricanes, Trinidad & Tobago Red Force, the Windward Islands Volcanoes, the Combined Campuses and Colleges, and the West Indies Academy. Trinidad & Tobago Red Force were the defending champions.

The finalists (Barbados Pride and Jamaica Scorpions) both forfeited the final when their captains were not present for a delayed toss, effectively refusing to play. As a result, Cricket West Indies declared that no champions would be crowned for this tournament.

== Squads ==
Barbados Pride	Combined Campuses and Colleges	Guyana Harpy Eagles	Jamaica Scorpions	Leeward Islands Hurricanes	Trinidad and Tobago Red Force	West Indies Academy	Windward Islands Volcanoes
Kyle Mayers (c); Zachary McCaskie; Leniko Boucher; Kadeem Alleyne; Kevin Wickham; Raymon Reifer; Nyeem Young; Dominic Drakes; Chemar Holder; Kemar Smith; Jomel Warrican; Matthew Jones; Javed Leacock; Demetrius Richards	Shamarh Brooks (c); Johann Jeremiah; Kieran Powell; Kamil Pooran; Shaqkere Parris; Jonathan Drakes; Demario Richards (wk); Amari Goodridge; Romario Greaves; Akshaya Persaud; Abhijai Mansingh; Mikkel Govia; Akeem Jordan; Khari Campbell	Tevin Imlach (c); Keemo Paul (vc); Tagenarine Chanderpaul; Matthew Nandu; Rampertab Ramnauth; Kevlon Anderson; Kemol Savory; Kevin Sinclair; Veerasammy Permaul; Ashmead Nedd; Ronaldo Alimohamed; Sylus Tyndall; Isai Thorne; Ronsford Beaton	John Campbell (c); Kirk McKenzie (vc); Odain McCatty; Carlos Brown; Jermaine Blackwood; Javelle Glen; Romaine Morrison (wk); Brad Barnes; Odean Smith; Jeavor Royal; Tamarie Redwood; Ojay Shields; Gordon Bryan; Marquino Mindley	Rahkeem Cornwall (c); Justin Greaves (vc); Dimitri Adams; Jewel Andrew; Keacy Carty; Jaeel Clarke; Daniel Doram; Jahmar Hamilton; Kadeem Henry; Chesney Hughes; Kofi James; Jeremiah Louis; Mikyle Louis; Javier Spencer; Oshane Thomas; Hayden Walsh Jr.; Akadianto Willett	Joshua Da Silva (c); Khary Pierre (vc); Amir Jangoo; Jason Mohammed; Jyd Goolie; Tion Webster; Bryan Charles; Kjorn Ottley; Isaiah Rajah; Terrance Hinds; Anderson Phillip; Yannic Cariah; Mark Deyal; Joshua James	Teddy Bishop (c); Ackeem Auguste; Carlon Bowen-Tuckett; Justin Jagessar; Mavendra Dindyal; Johann Layne; Michael Palmer; Zishan Motara; Rivaldo Clarke (wk); Jediah Blades; Joshua Bishop; Kelvin Pitman; McKenny Clarke; Nathan Edward; Raneico Smith	Sunil Ambris (c); Desron Maloney; Jeremy Solozano; Dillon Douglas (wk); Johnnel Eugene; Kavem Hodge; Shadrack Descarte; Shamar Springer; Stephan Pascal (wk); Darel Cyrus; Darius Martin; Gilon Tyson; Kenneth Dember; Ryan John

== Points table ==
Pos	Team	Pld	W	L	T	NR	Pts	NRR	Qualification
1	Trinidad and Tobago Red Force	7	5	1	0	1	63	1.049	Advanced to the semi-finals
2	Jamaica Scorpions	7	4	1	0	2	53	1.404	Advanced to the semi-finals
3	Leeward Islands Hurricanes	7	4	3	0	0	51	0.479	Advanced to the semi-finals
4	Barbados Pride	7	4	2	0	1	46	−0.001	Advanced to the semi-finals
5	Guyana Harpy Eagles	7	2	3	0	2	37	0.406	
6	Windward Islands Volcanoes	7	2	4	0	1	35	−0.655	
7	(Cricket West Indies) West Indies Academy	7	1	4	0	2	27	−1.521	
8	(Cricket West Indies) Combined Campuses and Colleges	7	1	5	0	1	24	−0.914	

Source: ESPNCricinfo

== Fixtures ==
Match 1
29 October 2024
09:00
Scorecard

Trinidad and Tobago Red Force; 194 (50 overs)	v	Combined Campuses and Colleges; 134 (38.1 overs)

Trinidad and Tobago Red Force won by 60 runs
Sir Frank Worrell Memorial Ground, St. Augustine
Umpires: Christopher Taylor and Carl Tuckett

- Combined Campuses and Colleges won the toss and elected to field.

Match 2
29 October 2024
13:00 (D/N)
Scorecard

Guyana Harpy Eagles; 274/5 (50 overs)	v	Windward Islands Volcanoes; 277/9 (49.3 overs)

Windward Islands Volcanoes won by 1 wicket
Brian Lara Cricket Academy, Tarouba
Umpires: Patrick Gustard and Jacqueline Williams

- Guyana Harpy Eagles won the toss and elected to bat.

Match 3
30 October 2024
09:00
Scorecard

Leeward Islands Hurricanes; 236/7 (47 overs)	v	West Indies Academy; 94 (27.5 overs)

Leeward Islands Hurricanes won by 142 runs
Queen's Park Oval, Port of Spain
Umpires: Shannon Crawford and Lyndon Rajkumar

- Leeward Islands Hurricanes won the toss and elected to bat.

Match 4
30 October 2024
09:00
Scorecard

Barbados Pride; 260/8 (50 overs)	v	Jamaica Scorpions; 199 (35 overs)

Barbados Pride won by 24 runs (DLS method)
Brian Lara Cricket Academy, Tarouba
Umpires: Nigel Duguid and Chris Wright

- Jamaica Scorpions won the toss and elected to field.

Match 5
31 October 2024
09:00
Scorecard

Guyana Harpy Eagles; 271/7 (45 overs)	v	Combined Campuses and Colleges; 32/1 (6.5 overs)

No result
Sir Frank Worrell Memorial Ground, St. Augustine
Umpires: Patrick Gustard and Candace la Borde

- Guyana Harpy Eagles won the toss and elected to bat.

Match 6
1 November 2024
09:00
Scorecard

Leeward Islands Hurricanes; 284/5 (50 overs)	v	Barbados Pride; 285/7 (49.4 overs)

Barbados Pride won by 3 wickets
Queen's Park Oval, Port of Spain
Umpires: Christopher Taylor and Jacqueline Williams

- Leeward Islands won the toss and elected to bat.

Match 7
1 November 2024
13:00 (D/N)
Scorecard

Windward Islands Volcanoes; 182 (45 overs)	v	Trinidad and Tobago Red Force; 186/3 (38 overs)

Trinidad and Tobago Red Force won by 7 wickets
Brian Lara Cricket Academy, Tarouba
Umpires: Ryan Banwarie and Nigel Duguid

- Trinidad and Tobago Red Force won the toss and elected to field.

Match 8
2 November 2024
09:00
Scorecard

Jamaica Scorpions; 250 (48.1 overs)	v	West Indies Academy; 155 (28 overs)

Jamaica Scorpions won by 80 runs (DLS method)
Sir Frank Worrell Memorial Ground, St. Augustine
Umpires: Shannon Crawford and Lyndon Rajkumar

- Jamaica Scorpions won the toss and elected to bat.

Match 9
3 November 2024
09:00
Scorecard

Guyana Harpy Eagles; 203 (47.3 overs)	v	Barbados Pride; 204/9 (49.3 overs)

Barbados Pride won by 1 wicket
Queen's Park Oval, Port of Spain
Umpires: Carl Tuckett and Chris Wright

- Barbados Pride won the toss and elected to field.

Match 10
3 November 2024
13:00 (D/N)
Scorecard

Trinidad and Tobago Red Force; 291/6 (50 overs)	v	Leeward Islands Hurricanes; 292/3 (47.3 overs)

Leeward Islands Hurricanes won by 7 wickets
Brian Lara Cricket Academy, Tarouba
Umpires: Patrick Gustard and Jacqueline Williams

- Leeward Islands Hurricanes won the toss and elected to field.

Match 11
4 November 2024
09:00
Scorecard

Combined Campuses and Colleges; 174 (39.5 overs)	v	West Indies Academy; 167/7 (40.5 overs)

West Indies Academy won by 23 runs (DLS method)
Sir Frank Worrell Memorial Ground, St Augustine
Umpires: Candace la Borde and Chris Wright

- Combined Campuses and Colleges won the toss and elected to bat.

Match 12
5 November 2024
09:00
Scorecard

Jamaica Scorpions; 155/4 (30.1 overs)	v	Windward Islands Volcanoes; 186 (29.3 overs)

Jamaica Scorpions won by 19 runs (DLS method)
Queen's Park Oval, Port of Spain
Umpires: Ryan Banwarie and Nigel Duguid

- Jamaica Scorpions won the toss and elected to bat.

Match 13
5 November 2024
13:00 (D/N)
Scorecard

Leeward Islands Hurricanes; 139 (34.2 overs)	v	Guyana Harpy Eagles; 141/2 (27.5 overs)

Guyana won by 8 wickets (DLS method)
Brian Lara Cricket Academy, Tarouba
Umpires: Lyndon Rajkumar and Christopher Taylor

- Guyana Harpy Eagles won the toss and elected to field.

Match 14
7 November 2024
09:00
Scorecard

Jamaica Scorpions; 162/6 (41.3 overs)	v	Guyana Harpy Eagles

No result
Queen's Park Oval, Port of Spain
Umpires: Lyndon Rajkumar and Carl Tuckett

- Guyana Harpy Eagles won the toss and elected to field.

Match 15
7 November 2024
09:00
Scorecard

West Indies Academy; 135 (34.2 overs)	v	Trinidad and Tobago Red Force; 136/1 (26.1 overs)

Trinidad and Tobago Red Force won by 9 wickets
Sir Frank Worrell Memorial Ground, St. Augustine
Umpires: Christopher Taylor and Jacqueline Williams

- Trinidad and Tobago Red Force won the toss and elected to field.

Match 16
8 November 2024
09:00
Scorecard

Leeward Islands Hurricanes; 180 (48.4 overs)	v	Windward Islands Volcanoes; 96 (21 overs)

Leeward Islands Hurricanes won by 84 runs
Sir Frank Worrell Memorial Ground, St. Augustine
Umpires: Nigel Duguid and Chris Wright

- Leeward Islands Hurricanes won the toss and elected to bat.

Match 17
8 November 2024
13:00 (D/N)
Scorecard

Barbados Pride; 264/7 (50 overs)	v	Combined Campuses and Colleges; 267/8 (45 overs)

Combined Campuses and Colleges won by 2 wickets
Brian Lara Cricket Academy, Tarouba
Umpires: Ryan Banwarie and Shannon Crawford

- Combined Campuses and Colleges won the toss and elected to field.

Match 18
9 November 2024
09:00
Scorecard

Trinidad and Tobago Red Force; 288/3 (45 overs)	v	Guyana Harpy Eagles; 201/7 (39 overs)

Trinidad and Tobago Red Force won by 45 runs (DLS method)
Queen's Park Oval, Port of Spain
Umpires: Patrick Gustard and Jacqueline Williams

- Guyana Harpy Eagles won the toss and elected to field.

Match 19
10 November 2024
09:00
Scorecard

Jamaica Scorpions; 289/8 (50 overs)	v	Combined Campuses and Colleges; 161 (38 overs)

Jamaica Scorpions won by 128 runs
Queen's Park Oval, Port of Spain
Umpires: Ryan Banwarie and Carl Tuckett

- Jamaica Scorpions won the toss and elected to bat.

Match 20
11 November 2024
09:00
Scorecard

Barbados Pride; 239/9 (46 overs)	v	Windward Islands Volcanoes; 237 (46 overs)

Barbados Pride won by 8 runs (DLS method)
Queen's Park Oval, Port of Spain
Umpires: Shannon Crawford and Nigel Duguid

- Barbados Pride won the toss and elected to bat.

Match 21
11 November 2024
13:00 (D/N)
Scorecard

West Indies Academy; 200 (45.5 overs)	v	Guyana Harpy Eagles; 204/8 (46.4 overs)

Guyana Harpy Eagles won by 2 wickets
Brian Lara Cricket Academy, Tarouba
Umpires: Christopher Taylor and Chris Wright

- Guyana Harpy Eagles won the toss and elected to field.

Match 22
12 November 2024
13:00 (D/N)
Scorecard

Jamaica Scorpions	v	Trinidad and Tobago Red Force

Match abandoned
Brian Lara Cricket Academy, Tarouba

- No toss.

Match 23
13 November 2024
09:00
Scorecard

West Indies Academy	v	Barbados Pride

Match abandoned
Sir Frank Worrell Memorial Ground, St. Augustine

- No toss.

Match 24
13 November 2024
13:00 (D/N)
Scorecard

Windward Islands Volcanoes; 307/7 (44 overs)	v	Combined Campuses and Colleges; 213 (36.3 overs)

Windward Islands Volcanoes won by 98 runs (DLS method)
Brian Lara Cricket Academy, Tarouba
Umpires: Nigel Duguid and Candace la Borde

- Combined Campuses and Colleges won the toss and elected to field.

Match 25
15 November 2024
13:00 (D/N)
Scorecard

Jamaica Scorpions; 264/9 (43 overs)	v	Leeward Islands Hurricanes; 182 (34.3 overs)

Jamaica Scorpions won by 82 runs (DLS method)
Brian Lara Cricket Academy, Tarouba
Umpires: Shannon Crawford and Nigel Duguid

- Leeward Islands Hurricanes won the toss and elected to field.

Match 26
16 November 2024
09:00
Scorecard

Barbados Pride; 258/9 (45 overs)	v	Trinidad and Tobago Red Force; 259/1 (43.3 overs)

Trinidad and Tobago Red Force won by 9 wickets
Queen's Park Oval, Port of Spain
Umpires: Patrick Gustard and Carl Tuckett

- Trinidad and Tobago Red Force won the toss and elected to field.

Match 27
17 November 2024
09:00
Scorecard

Combined Campuses and Colleges; 151 (36 overs)	v	Leeward Islands Hurricanes; 154/6 (19.4 overs)

Leeward Islands Hurricanes won by 4 wickets
Queen's Park Oval, Port of Spain
Umpires: Ryan Banwarie and Christopher Taylor

- Leeward Islands Hurricanes won the toss and elected to field.

Match 28
17 November 2024
09:00
Scorecard

Windward Islands Volcanoes; 278/5 (50 overs)	v	West Indies Academy; 69/0 (11 overs)

No result
Sir Frank Worrell Memorial Ground, St. Augustine
Umpires: Candace la Borde and Chris Wright

- Windward Islands Volcanoes won the toss and elected to bat.

== Knockout stage ==
Semi-finals
1	Trinidad and Tobago Red Force	186 (36.3 overs)
4	Barbados Pride	339/7 (50 overs)
2	Jamaica Scorpions	352/9 (50 overs)
3	Leeward Islands Hurricanes	245 (35.4 overs)

Final
SFW1	Barbados Pride	Rainout (NR)
SFW2	Jamaica Scorpions	Rainout (NR)

=== Semi-finals ===
Semi-final 1
20 November 2024
13:00 (D/N)
Scorecard

Barbados Pride; 339/7 (50 overs)	v	Trinidad and Tobago Red Force; 186 (36.3 overs)
Zachary McCaskie 94 (82); Mark Deyal 4/53 (10 overs)		Tion Webster 56 (47); Dominic Drakes 3/24 (4.3 overs)

Barbados Pride won by 153 runs
Brian Lara Cricket Academy, Tarouba
Umpires: Patrick Gustard and Carl Tuckett
Player of the match: Zachary McCaskie (Barbados Pride)

- Trinidad and Tobago Red Force won the toss and elected to field.

Semi-final 2
21 November 2024
13:00 (D/N)
Scorecard

Jamaica Scorpions; 352/9 (50 overs)	v	Leeward Islands Hurricanes; 245 (35.4 overs)
Javelle Glenn 114* (96); Rahkeem Cornwall 4/67 (10 overs)		Kofi James 79 (64); Marquino Mindley 4/46 (8.4 overs)

Jamaica Scorpions won by 107 runs
Brian Lara Cricket Academy, Tarouba
Umpires: Ryan Banwarie and Nigel Duguid
Player of the match: Jeavor Royal (Jamaica Scorpions)

- Leeward Islands Hurricanes won the toss and elected to field.

=== Final ===
Final
23 November 2024
13:00 (D/N)
Scorecard

Barbados Pride	v	Jamaica Scorpions

Match Forfeited (both teams)
Brian Lara Cricket Academy, Tarouba

- No toss due to rain.
- Both sides forfeited the match by not being present for the delayed toss.
