= 2023–24 West Indies Championship =

Domestic Four Day regional red ball cricket tournament in the West Indies

- Dates: 7 February 2024 – 20 April 2024
- Administrator: CWI
- Cricket format: First-class
- Tournament format: Round-robin
- Champions: Guyana (13th title)
- Participants: 8
- Matches: 28
- Most runs: (British Leeward Islands) Mikyle Louis (682)
- Most wickets: (Cricket West Indies) Joshua Bishop (42)

The 2023–24 West Indies Championship was the 56th edition of the Regional Four Day Competition, the domestic first-class cricket competition for the countries of the Cricket West Indies (CWI). It began on 7 February and the last game ended on 20 April 2024. The six franchise teams from the previous season participated as well as two new teams were added to the circuit time. The West Indies Academy team made their debut in the West Indies first-class season and the Combined Campuses and Colleges team, made a return after a few years’ absence.

The prize money of the championship was set at US$250,000 for the winner and US$100,000 for the runners up.

With the match between the Leeward Islands and the Windward Islands ending in a draw, Guyana retain their championship and continue their dominance after winning seven championships in the last nine year.

== Points table ==
Team	Pld	W	L	D	T	M. Pts	B. Pts	Pts	Quotient
Guyana	7	5	1	1	0	61	42.8	103.8	1.445
Windward Islands	7	4	2	1	0	51	47.2	98.2	1.060
Leeward Islands	7	4	2	1	0	51	43.0	94.0	1.086
Barbados	7	4	3	0	0	48	44.6	92.6	1.167
Trinidad and Tobago	7	4	2	1	0	49	43.0	92.0	1.403
West Indies Academy	7	3	4	0	0	36	35.6	71.6	0.906
Jamaica	7	2	5	0	0	24	35.4	59.4	0.731
Combined Campuses and Colleges	7	0	7	0	0	0	30.2	30.2	0.580

Champions

- Match Points: 12 points for a win, 3 for a draw, 0 for a loss.

=== Match Summary ===
Each team's cumulative total points at the end of each round are listed.

Team	Round							Total
Team	1	2	3	4	5	6	7	Total
Guyana	4.4	10.4	26.4	46.2	66.8	87.2	103.8	103.8
Windward Islands	21.4	42.4	62.2	67.4	71.6	90.0	98.2	98.2
Leeward Islands	5.6	25.8	45.6	64.2	81.2	84.6	94.0	94.0
Barbados	19	22.8	43.8	48.2	67.4	87.6	92.6	92.6
Trinidad and Tobago	3.0	23.2	27.6	47.2	51	72.8	92.0	92.0
West Indies Academy	17.4	19.4	24.0	30.8	49.8	54.2	71.6	71.6
Jamaica	4.4	24.4	29.6	50.2	53.4	57.0	59.4	59.5
Combined Campuses and Colleges	3	9.6	14.6	19.8	24.2	26.6	30.2	30.2

Win	Loss	Draw	Abandoned

== Fixtures ==
=== Round 1 ===
7–10 February 2024
Scorecard

Jamaica	v	Windward Islands
159 (41 overs); Romaine Morrison 35 (30); Ryan John 5/43 (13 overs)		341 (105.2 overs); Johann Jeremiah 80 (149); Gordon Bryan 4/64 (23 overs)
234 (73.4 overs); Romaine Morrison 68 (76); Darius Martin 4/85 (16 overs)		55/1 (16 overs); Jeremy Solozano 29* (45); Marquino Mindley 1/13 (5 overs)

Windward Islands won by 9 wickets
Sabina Park, Kingston
Umpires: Gregory Brathwaite & Jacqueline Williams

- Windward Islands elected to field
- Shadrack Descarte (Windward Islands) made his first-class debut.
- Points: Windward Islands 21.4, Jamaica 4.4

7–10 February 2024
Scorecard

Barbados	v	Combined C&C
344/8 (72.2 overs); Kevin Wickham 139 (135); Romario Greaves 2/54 (10 overs)		185 (78.3 overs); Jonathan Carter 59 (131); Jomel Warrican 4/29 (22.3 overs)
35/1 (4.4 overs); Zachary McCaskie 28* (14); Jediah Blades 1/19 (2.4 overs)		193 (66.5 overs) (f/o); Shamarh Brooks 72 (134); Chaim Holder 5/69 (24.5 overs)

Barbados win by 9 wickets
Chedwin Park, Spanish Town
Umpires: Christopher Taylor and Zahid Bassarath

- Combined Campuses & Colleges elected to field
- Demario Richards, Govasta Edmond, Jediah Blades, Kirstan Kallicharan, Romario Greaves, Sion Hackett, Shatrughan Rambaran, Shaqkere Parris, Zishan Motara (Combined Campuses And Colleges) made their first-class debut.
- Points: Barbados 19, Combined Campuses and Colleges 3

7–10 February 2024
Scorecard

Leeward Islands	v	West Indies Academy
137 (54.1 overs); Jeremiah Louis 45 (122); Joshua James 3/11 (7 overs)		177 (47.2 overs); Joshua Bishop 48 (47); Jeremiah Louis 5/29 (14 overs)
232 (87.4 overs); Jahmar Hamilton 70 (152); Joshua Bishop 3/33 (16 overs)		195/5 (33.5 overs); Kadeem Alleyne 57 (20); Jeremiah Louis 3/41 (9 overs)

West Indies Academy win by 5 wickets
Warner Park Sporting Complex, Basseterre
Umpires: Danesh Ramdhanie and Shannon Crawford

- West Indies Academy won the toss and elected to field
- Joshua James, Kadeem Alleyne, Mbeki Joseph, Rivaldo Clarke (West Indies Academy) and Joshua Grant, Mikyle Louis (Leeward Islands) made their first-class debut.
- Points: West Indies Academy 17.4, Leeward Islands 5.6

7–10 February 2024
Scorecard

Trinidad and Tobago	v	Guyana
215/4 (81.2 overs); Jason Mohammed 100* (227); Veerasammy Permaul 2/40 (25 overs)

Match Drawn
Conaree Sports Club, Basseterre
Umpires: Carl Tuckett and Jonathan Blades

- Trinidad and Tobago elected to bat
- No play was possible on Day 2, 3 and 4 due to rain and a wet outfield.
- Neiland Cadogan, Ronaldo Alimohamed, Raymond Perez and Steven Sankar (Guyana) made their First Class debut.
- Points: Trinidad & Tobago 3, Guyana 4.4

=== Round 2 ===
14–17 February 2024
Scorecard

Combined C&C	v	Jamaica
307 (97 overs); Jonathan Carter 135* (217); Gordon Bryan 3/66 (23 overs)		331 (91.2 overs); Chadwick Walton 163 (245); Zishan Motara 7/108 (31.2 overs)
87 (30.4 overs); Kirstan Kallicharan 29 (71); Pete Salmon 4/12 (7 overs)		69/0 (9.3 overs); Chadwick Walton 46* (33)

Jamaica won by 10 wickets
Sabina Park, Kingston
Umpires: Christopher Taylor and Gregory Brathwaite
Player of the match: Chadwick Walton (Jam)

- Jamaica elected to field
- Points: Jamaica 20, Combined Campuses and Colleges 6.6

14–17 February 2024
Scorecard

Barbados	v	Windward Islands
214 (49.5 overs); Kevin Wickham 74 (104); Ryan John 4/47 (16 overs)		325 (98.1 overs); Jeremy Solozano 86 (160); Jomel Warrican 5/59 (24.1 overs)
126 (38.1 overs); Roshon Primus 25* (26); Shamar Springer 4/44 (12 overs)		18/1 (3.5 overs); Jeremy Solozano 13* (14)

Windward Island won by 9 wickets
Kensington Park, Kingston
Umpires: Chris Wright and Zahid Bassarath
Player of the match: Shamar Springer (WWD)

- Windward Islands elected to field
- Darel Cyrus (Windward Islands) made his first-class debut.
- Points: Windward Islands 21, Barbados 3.8

14–17 February 2024
Scorecard

Leeward Islands	v	Guyana
352 (99.2 overs); Mikyle Louis 113 (221); Ronaldo Alimohamed 5/69 (19.5 overs)		118 (57.3 overs); Ronaldo Alimohamed 41 (56); Daniel Doram 4/40 (12.3 overs)
295 (69.4 overs); Mikyle Louis 130 (168); Kevlon Anderson 5/57 (15 overs)		186 (84.3 overs); Tagenarine Chanderpaul 47 (173); Rahkeem Cornwall 6/61 (34 overs)

Leeward Islands Hurricanes won by 273 runs
Warner Park Sporting Complex, Basseterre

- Leeward Islands Hurricanes won the toss and elected to bat
- Jewel Andrew (Leeward Islands) made his first-class debut.
- Points: Leeward Islands 20.2, Guyana 6

14–17 February 2024
Scorecard

West Indies Academy	v	Trinidad and Tobago
163 (39 overs); Teddy Bishop 65 (74); Jayden Seales 3/26 (9 overs)		329 (115.4 overs); Jyd Goolie 113 (248); Ashmead Nedd 6/78 (36.4 overs)
224 (70.1 overs); Carlon Bowen-Tuckett 46 (96); Anderson Phillip 4/33 (11.1 overs)		60/4 (16.2 overs); Vikash Mohan 18 (36); Joshua Bishop 3/28 (8 overs)

Trinidad & Tobago won by 6 wickets
Conaree Sports Club, Basseterre
Umpires: Jonathan Blades and Ryan Banwarie
Player of the match: Anderson Phillip (T&T)

- West Indies Academy elected to bat
- Points: Trinidad & Tobago 20.2, West Indies Academy 2

=== Round 3 ===
21–24 February 2024
Scorecard

Trinidad and Tobago	v	Leeward Islands
137 (60.2 overs); Jyd Goolie 38 (58); Colin Archibald 3/28 (10 overs)		318 (98.2 overs); Jewel Andrew 87 (146); Anderson Phillip 4/62 (19 overs)
342 (133.3 overs); Jyd Goolie 64 (211); Rahkeem Cornwall 3/56 (29 overs)		165/6 (48 overs); Keacy Carty 53 (136); Khary Pierre 4/69 (18 overs)

Leeward Island won by 4 wickets
Warner Park Sporting Complex, Basseterre
Umpires: Carl Tuckett and Shannon Crawford
Player of the match: Jewel Andrew (LI)

- Leeward Islands elected to field
- Points: Leeward Islands 19.8, Trinidad & Tobago 4.4

21–24 February 2024
Scorecard

Guyana	v	West Indies Academy
175 (54.3 overs); Ronaldo Alimohamed 30 (33); Joshua James 4/43 (13.3 overs)		162 (49 overs); Rashawn Worrell 58 (146); Kevin Sinclair 4/45 (16 overs)
415/7d (112.1 overs); Kevin Sinclair 165* (182); Ashmead Nedd 5/97 (45 overs)		207 (49.5 overs); Carlon Bowen-Tuckett 65 (96); Isai Thorne 4/49 (13 overs)

Guyana won by 221 runs
Coolidge Cricket Ground, Coolidge, Antigua
Umpires: Danesh Ramdhanie and Jonathan Blades
Player of the match: Kevin Sinclair (Guy)

- Guyana won the toss and elected to bat
- Points: Guyana 16, West Indies Academy 4.6

21–24 February 2024
Scorecard

Jamaica	v	Barbados
269 (78.4 overs); Romaine Morrison 97* (126); Jomel Warrican 5/62 (27.4 overs)		389 (120 overs); Kraigg Brathwaite 142 (314); Derval Green 4/78 (31 overs)
292 (83.2 overs); Abhijai Mansingh 54 (103); Shaquille Cumberbatch 5/46 (14.2 overs)		176/6 (38.3 overs); Roshon Primus 43 (34); Pete Salmon 3/69 (19 overs)

Barbados won by 4 wickets
Sabina Park, Kingston
Umpires: Gregory Brathwaite and Jacqueline Williams
Player of the match: Shaquille Cumberbatch (BDOS)

- Barbados won the toss and elected to field.
- Shaquille Cumberbatch (Barbados) made his first-class debut.
- Points: Barbados 21, Jamaica 5.2

21–24 February 2024
Scorecard

Combined C&C	v	Windward Islands
204 (71.3 overs); Demario Richards 46 (104); Darel Cyrus 6/72 (25 overs)		395 (105.4 overs); Kavem Hodge 158* (250); Romario Greaves 5/142 (38 overs)
315 (91.5 overs); Jonathan Carter 63 (129); Shamar Springer 2/33 (13 overs)		128/2 (23.2 overs); Alick Athanaze 58* (42); Romario Greaves 2/64 (11 overs)

Windward Is won by 8 wickets
Chedwin Park, Spanish Town
Umpires: Chris Wright and Christopher Taylor
Player of the match: Kavem Hodge (WWD)

- Windward Islands elected to field
- Damel Evelyn, Sadique Henry (Combined Campuses and Colleges) and Gillon Tyson (Windward Islands) made their first-class debut.
- Points: Windward Islands 19.8, Combined Campuses and Colleges 5

=== Round 4 ===
13–16 March 2024
Scorecard

Windward Islands	v	Trinidad and Tobago
191 (53 overs); Alick Athanaze 56 (85); Anderson Phillip 5/37 (13 overs)		294 (87 overs); Tion Webster 107* (139); Kenneth Dember 5/63 (22 overs)
288 (97.2 overs); Sunil Ambris 71 (97); Jayden Seales 3/45 (19 overs)		186/4 (69.4 overs); Jyd Goolie 90 (212); Kenneth Dember 1/36 (23 overs)

Trinidad and Tobago won by 6 wickets
Queen's Park Oval, Port of Spain
Umpires: Nigel Duguid and Shannon Crawford
Player of the match: Tion Webster (Trinidad and Tobago)

- Trinidad & Tobago won the toss and elected to field.
- Points: Trinidad & Tobago 19.6, Windward Islands 5.2

13–16 March 2024
Scorecard

Combined Campuses and Colleges	v	Leeward Islands
273 (81.2 overs); Amari Goodridge 75 (91); Daniel Doram 4/37 (21.2 overs)		259 (62.2 overs); Kieran Powell 114 (152); Romario Greaves 5/63 (19.2 overs)
301 (109 overs); Yannick Ottley 99 (260); Rahkeem Cornwall 4/62 (30 overs)		319/7 (72.5 overs); Keacy Carty 61 (90); Jediah Blades 3/50 (15 overs)

Leeward Islands won by 3 wickets
Sir Frank Worrell Memorial Ground, St Augustine, Trinidad
Umpires: Lyndon Rajkumar and Leslie Reifer
Player of the match: Kieran Powell (Leeward Islands)

- Combined Campuses and Colleges won the toss and elected to bat.
- Amari Goodridge (Combined C&C) made his first-class debut.
- Points: Leeward Islands 18.6, Combined Campuses and Colleges 5.2

13–16 March 2024
Scorecard

Guyana	v	Barbados
436 (142.1 overs); Veerasammy Permaul 90* (151); Jason Holder 2/52 (20 overs)		230 (68.3 overs); Jonathan Drakes 101 (204); Nial Smith 3/54 (12 overs)
136/8d (32.2 overs); Kevlon Anderson 33 (57); Jomel Warrican 3/32 (9.2 overs)		309 (84.5 overs); Zachary McCaskie 87 (103); Nial Smith 4/87 (13.5 overs)

Guyana won by 33 runs
Coolidge Cricket Ground, Antigua
Umpires: Zahid Bassarath and Carl Tuckett
Player of the match: Veerasammy Permaul (Guyana)

- Barbados won the toss and elected to field.
- Shian Brathwaite (Barbados) made his first-class debut.
- Points: Guyana 19.8, Barbados 4.4

13–16 March 2024
Scorecard

West Indies Academy	v	Jamaica
324 (82 overs); Joshua Dorne 83 (132); Ojay Shields 3/38 (12 overs)		372 (108.2 overs); Pete Salmon 81 (198); Joshua Bishop 6/96 (33.2 overs)
281 (74.1 overs); Carlon Bowen-Tuckett 53 (132); Abhijai Mansingh 4/70 (14 overs)		236/8 (82 overs); Brandon King 65 (127); Joshua Bishop 4/79 (34 overs)

Jamaica won by 2 wickets
Sabina Park, Kingston, Jamaica
Umpires: Deighton Butler and Patrick Gustard
Player of the match: Joshua Bishop (West Indies Academy)

- Jamaica won the toss and elected to field.
- Joshua Dorne (West Indies Academy) made his first-class debut.
- Points: Jamaica 20.6, West Indies Academy 6.8

=== Round 5 ===
20–23 March 2024
Scorecard

Trinidad and Tobago	v	Barbados
172 (53.5 overs); Amir Jangoo 93* (159); Jason Holder 4/47 (17 overs)		279 (87.3 overs); Jonathan Drakes 72 (134); Khary Pierre 3/54 (28 overs)
124 (46.1 overs); Kjorn Ottley 39 (59); Jomel Warrican 6/31 (17 overs)		20/2 (7.1 overs); Jonathan Drakes 14* (20); Khary Pierre 2/10 (3.1 overs)

Barbados won by 8 wickets
Queen's Park Oval, Port of Spain, Trinidad
Umpires: Shannon Crawford and Nigel Duguid

- Trinidad & Tobago won the toss and elected to bat.

20–23 March 2024
Scorecard

Guyana	v	Windward Islands
308 (80.5 overs); Kevin Sinclair 74 (102); Darel Cyrus 5/67 (12.5 overs)		113 (31.5 overs); Tevyn Walcott 41* (47); Isai Thorne 4/38 (11 overs)
224/2d (87 overs); Tevin Imlach 107 (243); Darius Martin 1/45 (16 overs)		164 (56.2 overs); Shamar Springer 69* (136); Nial Smith 5/29 (11 overs)

Guyana won by 255 runs
Coolidge Cricket Ground, Antigua
Umpires: Zahid Bassarath and Leslie Reifer

- Guyana won the toss and elected to bat.

20–23 March 2024
Scorecard

West Indies Academy	v	Combined Campuses and Colleges
300 (78.3 overs); Carlon Bowen-Tuckett 76* (120); Yannick Ottley 5/47 (22.3 overs)		231 (80.2 overs); Demario Richards 59 (94); Ashmead Nedd 4/51 (22 overs)
316/7d (87 overs); Teddy Bishop 114 (170); Romario Greaves 3/76 (21 overs)		324 (93.4 overs); Kamil Pooran 88 (99); Joshua Bishop 4/93 (32 overs)

West Indies Academy won by 61 runs
Sir Frank Worrell Memorial Ground, St Augustine, Trinidad
Umpires: Ryan Banwarie and Gregory Brathwaite

- Combined Campuses and Colleges won the toss and elected to field.

=== Round 6 ===
10–13 April 2024
Scorecard

Trinidad and Tobago	v	Combined C&C
591/7d (123 overs); Amir Jangoo 218 (238); Amari Goodridge 5/92 (22 overs)		238 (77 overs); Yannick Ottley 56* (130); Anderson Phillip 5/71 (22 overs)
95/2d (17 overs); Jason Mohammed 41* (51); Amari Goodridge 1/23 (5 overs)		325 (108.3 overs); Damel Evelyn 73 (182); Bryan Charles 4/46 (23.3 overs)

Trinidad & Tobago won by 123 runs
Sir Frank Worrell Memorial Ground, Saint Augustine
Umpires: Christopher Taylor and Lyndon Rajkumar
Player of the match: Amir Jangoo (T&T)

- Combined Campuses and Colleges elected to field first
- Points: Trinidad & Tobago 21.8, Combined Campuses and Colleges 2.4

10–13 April 2024
Scorecard

Barbados	v	Leewards Islands
542/9d (143 overs); Kraigg Brathwaite 189 (400); Rahkeem Cornwall 5/132 (33 overs)		288 (93.2 overs); Keacy Carty 127 (232); Roston Chase 3/47 (14.2 overs)
58/1 (10.4 overs); Kraigg Brathwaite 30* (38); Jewel Andrew 1/5 (0.4 overs)		311 (101.2 overs) (f/o); Mikyle Louis 80 (194); Roston Chase 7/67 (33.2 overs)

Barbados won by 9 wickets
Sir Vivian Richards Stadium, North Sound
Umpires: Deighton Butler and Patrick Gustard

- Barbados elected to bat
- Demetrius Richards and Javed Leacock (Barbados) made their first-class debut.
- Points: Barbados 20.2, Leeward Islands 3.4

10–13 April 2024
Scorecard

Windward Islands	v	West Indies Academy
162 (48.3 overs); Shamar Springer 31 (43); Joshua Bishop 4/24 (9.3 overs)		158 (39.4 overs); Carlon Bowen-Tuckett 36* (65); Gillon Tyson 5/50 (13.4 overs)
275 (93 overs); Alick Athanaze 89 (119); Joshua Bishop 4/78 (38 overs)		121 (34.4 overs); Teddy Bishop 47 (83); Shamar Springer 4/30 (9.4 overs)

Windward Island won by 158 runs
Coolidge Cricket Ground, Antigua
Umpires: Leslie Reifer and Nigel Duguid
Player of the match: Shamar Springer (WID)

- Windward Islands elected to bat
- Stephan Pascal (Windward Islands) made his first-class debut.
- Points: Windward Islands 18.4, West Indies Academy 4.4

10–13 April 2024
Scorecard

Guyana	v	Jamaica
424 (116.3 overs); Kemol Savory 155 (309); Ojay Shields 4/103 (23 overs)		153 (61.1 overs); Brandon King 32 (51); Veerasammy Permaul 5/55 (21 overs)
147/4d (35.3 overs); Tevin Imlach 44 (70); Derval Green 2/39 (11.3 overs)		206 (71.1 overs); Kirk McKenzie 40 (124); Kevin Sinclair 3/32 (19 overs)

Guyana won by 212 runs
Sabina Park, Kingston
Umpires: Chris Wright and Joel Wilson
Player of the match: Gudakesh Motie (Guy)

- Jamaica elected to field first
- Javaughn Buchanan (Jamaica) made his first-class debut.
- Points: Guyana 20.4, Jamaica 3.6

=== Round 7 ===
17–19 April 2024
Scorecard

Trinidad and Tobago	v	Jamaica
432 (122 overs); Joshua Da Silva 106 (140); Jeavor Royal 3/113 (37 overs)		189 (63.4 overs); Kirk McKenzie 57 (153); Bryan Charles 6/82 (25 overs)
		118 (44.4 overs) (f/o); Javaughn Buchanan 33 (95); Bryan Charles 7/43 (13.4 overs)

Trinidad & Tobago won by an innings and 125 runs
Sabina Park, Kingston
Umpires: Chris Wright and Joel Wilson
Player of the match: Bryan Charles (T&T)

- Jamaica elected to field
- Andrea Dennis, Justin Beckford (Jamaica) and Navin Bidaisee (Trinidad and Tobago) all made their first-class debuts.
- Points: Trinidad and Tobago 19.2, Jamaica 2.4

17–20 April 2024
Scorecard

Combined C&C	v	Guyana
200 (55.5 overs); Demario Richards 43 (83); Nial Smith 3/45 (12 overs)		223 (60.4 overs); Raymond Perez 62 (91); Avinash Mahabirsingh 8/51 (17.4 overs)
203 (64.2 overs); Shamarh Brooks 59 (128); Kevin Sinclair 2/29 (10 overs)		182/2 (34.5 overs); Raymond Perez 79* (92); Romario Greaves 1/34 (6 overs)

Guyana won by 8 wickets
Sir Frank Worrell Memorial Ground, Saint Augustine
Umpires: Carl Tuckett and Leslie Reifer
Player of the match: Raymond Perez (Guy)

- Combined Campuses and Colleges elected to bat
- Avinash Mahabirsingh and Jarion Hoyte (Combined Campus and Colleges) made their first-class debut.
- Avinash Mahabirsingh took his first five-wicket haul in first-class cricket.
- Points: Guyana 16.6, Combined Campuses and Colleges 3.6

17–20 April 2024
Scorecard

Leeward Islands	v	Windward Islands
300 (82.5 overs); Mikyle Louis 100 (193); Ryan John 3/67 (16 overs)		179 (53 overs); Johann Jeremiah 41 (89); Daniel Doram 6/34 (16 overs)
294 (79.2 overs); Keacy Carty 65 (125); Kavem Hodge 3/60 (19 overs)		296/7 (94 overs); Stephan Pascal 64 (113); Daniel Doram 4/65 (31 overs)

Match Drawn
Sir Vivian Richards Stadium, North Sound
Umpires: Gregory Brathwaite and Patrick Gustard

- Leeward Islands elected to bat
- Points: Leeward Islands 9.4, Windward Islands 8.2

17–20 April 2024
Scorecard

Barbados	v	West Indies Academy
155 (39.5 overs); Jonathan Drakes 35 (56); Johann Layne 3/23 (8 overs)		243 (61.3 overs); Ackeem Auguste 76 (137); Akeem Jordan 4/76 (16 overs)
308 (113.3 overs); Kraigg Brathwaite 90 (250); Joshua Bishop 3/59 (30 overs)		219/7 (67.4 overs); Rashawn Worrell 63 (137); Kraigg Brathwaite 3/28 (10.4 overs)

West Indies Academy win by 3 wickets
Coolidge Cricket Ground, Antigua
Umpires: Deighton Butler and Nigel Duguid

- Barbados elected to bat
- West Indies Academy 17.4, Barbados 5
