= 2025 Caribbean Premier League =

Thirteenth season of the Caribbean Premier League

- Dates: 14 August – 21 September 2025
- Administrator: Cricket West Indies
- Cricket format: Twenty20
- Tournament format(s): Round-robin and playoffs
- Hosts: Various: Antigua and Barbuda; Barbados; Guyana; Saint Kitts and Nevis; Saint Lucia; Trinidad and Tobago
- Champions: Trinbago Knight Riders (5th title)
- Runners-up: Guyana Amazon Warriors
- Participants: 6
- Matches: 34
- Player of the series: Kieron Pollard (Trinbago Knight Riders)
- Most runs: Shai Hope (Guyana Amazon Warriors) (491)
- Most wickets: Imran Tahir (Guyana Amazon Warriors) (23)
- Official website: cplt20.com

The 2025 Caribbean Premier League (CPLT20) or for sponsorship reasons, Republic Bank CPL 2025, was the thirteenth season of the Caribbean Premier League, the domestic Twenty20 cricket league that was played in the West Indies. The tournament ran from 14 August to 21 September 2025. The matches were played across six countries in the Caribbean: Antigua and Barbuda, Barbados, Guyana, Saint Kitts and Nevis, Saint Lucia, and Trinidad and Tobago. Saint Lucia Kings were the defending champions.

Trinbago Knight Riders won their 5th title, having defeated Guyana Amazon Warriors in the final by 3 wickets.

== Teams ==
Team	Captain	Head coach
Antigua & Barbuda Falcons	Imad Wasim	Paul Nixon
Barbados Royals	Rovman Powell	Trevor Penney
Guyana Amazon Warriors	Imran Tahir	Lance Klusener
St Kitts & Nevis Patriots	Jason Holder	Simon Helmot
Saint Lucia Kings	David Wiese	Daren Sammy
Trinbago Knight Riders	Nicholas Pooran	Dwayne Bravo

== Venues ==
Location of CPL teams
Antigua and Barbuda	Barbados	Guyana
Sir Vivian Richards Stadium	Kensington Oval	Providence Stadium
Capacity: 10,000	Capacity: 28,000	Capacity: 15,000
Saint Kitts and Nevis	Saint Lucia	Trinidad and Tobago
Warner Park Sporting Complex	Daren Sammy Cricket Ground	Brian Lara Cricket Academy
Capacity: 8,000	Capacity: 12,400	Capacity: 15,000

== Squads ==
The following players were retained or signed by their respective teams.

Antigua & Barbuda Falcons	Barbados Royals	Guyana Amazon Warriors	St Kitts & Nevis Patriots	Saint Lucia Kings	Trinbago Knight Riders
Imad Wasim (c); Shakib Al Hasan; Fabian Allen; Naveen-ul-Haq; Obed McCoy; Justin Greaves; Bevon Jacobs; Jayden Seales; Allah Ghazanfar; Rahkeem Cornwall; Odean Smith; Jewel Andrew; Shamar Springer; Amir Jangoo; Karima Gore; Kevin Wickham; Joshua James	Rovman Powell (c); Brandon King; Sherfane Rutherford; Quinton de Kock; Mujeeb Ur Rahman; Azmatullah Omarzai; Jomel Warrican; Kadeem Alleyne; Shaqkere Parris; Kofi James; Nyeem Young; Rivaldo Clarke; Zishan Motara; Johann Layne; Ramon Simmonds; Eathan Bosch; Daniel Sams	Imran Tahir (c); Shimron Hetmyer; Romario Shepherd; Shai Hope; ~~Glenn Phillips~~; Ben McDermott; Gudakesh Motie; Moeen Ali; Shamar Joseph; Keemo Paul; Dwaine Pretorius; Shamarh Brooks; Kemol Savory; Hassan Khan; Jediah Blades; Kevlon Anderson; Quentin Sampson; Riyad Latif	Jason Holder (c); Kyle Mayers; Rilee Rossouw; Evin Lewis; Fazalhaq Farooqi (Note: Fazalhaq Farooqi was unavailable for the remainder of the season due to national duties. He was replaced by Mohammad Rizwan.); ~~Corbin Bosch~~; Naseem Shah; Waqar Salamkheil; Andre Fletcher; Alick Athanaze; ~~Mohammad Nawaz~~; Dominic Drakes; Mikyle Louis; Ashmead Nedd; Jeremiah Louis; Jyd Goolie; Navin Bidaisee; Leniko Boucher; Replacements: Mohammad Rizwan; Abbas Afridi (Note: Mohammad Nawaz was unavailable for the season. He was replaced by Abbas Afridi.); Babar Azam; Abdullah Shafique	David Wiese (c); Tim David; Alzarri Joseph; Johnson Charles; Tim Seifert; Roston Chase; Tabraiz Shamsi; Delano Potgieter; Matthew Forde; Aaron Jones; Khary Pierre; Javelle Glen; Micah McKenzie; Shadrack Descarte; Johann Jerimah; Keon Gaston; Ackeem Auguste	Nicholas Pooran (c); Kieron Pollard; Andre Russell; Sunil Narine; Alex Hales; Akeal Hosein; Mohammad Amir; Colin Munro; Usman Tariq; Ali Khan; Darren Bravo; Yannic Cariah; Keacy Carty; Terrance Hinds; McKenny Clarke; Joshua Da Silva; Nathan Edward

== Standing ==
=== Points table ===
The tournament follows a double round-robin format in the league stage wherein each team plays ten games. The top four teams will qualify for the play-offs.

Pos	Team	Pld	W	L	T	NR	Pts	NRR	Qualification
1	Saint Lucia Kings	10	5	3	0	2	12	0.746	Advanced to Qualifier 1
2	Guyana Amazon Warriors (R)	10	6	4	0	0	12	0.629	Advanced to Qualifier 1
3	Trinbago Knight Riders (C)	10	6	4	0	0	12	0.018	Advanced to Eliminator
4	Antigua & Barbuda Falcons	10	5	4	0	1	11	−0.757	Advanced to Eliminator
5	St Kitts & Nevis Patriots	10	4	6	0	0	8	−0.110	
6	Barbados Royals	10	2	7	0	1	5	−0.379	

Source: ESPNcricinfo
(C) Champions; (R) Runners-up
- If teams fail to bowl their overs within the allotted time they will be given a Net Run Rate penalty as outlined below:
  - One (1) over down-Penalty of 0.05 deduction from their NRR
  - Each additional over down-Penalty of 0.10 deduction from their NRR

=== Match summary ===
Team	Group matches								Playoffs			
Team	1	2	3	4	5	6	7	8	E	Q1	Q2	F
Antigua & Barbuda Falcons	0	1	3	3	5	5	5	7	L			
Guyana Amazon Warriors	2	4	4	4	6	6	6	8		W		L
Saint Lucia Kings	1	3	3	5	7	9	11	11		L	L	
St Kitts & Nevis Patriots	2	2	2	2	2	2	2	4				
Trinbago Knight Riders	2	2	4	6	8	10	10	10	W		W	W

Win	Loss	No result

- Note: The total points at the end of each group match are listed.
- Note: Click on the points (group matches) or W/L (playoffs) to see the match summary.

Visitor team →	ABF	GAW	SLK	SKNP	TKR
Home team ↓	ABF	GAW	SLK	SKNP	TKR
Antigua & Barbuda Falcons		Guyana; 83 runs	Match abandoned	Antigua; 7 wickets	Antigua; 8 runs
Guyana Amazon Warriors	Antigua; 4 wickets		Guyana; 2 wickets	St Kitts; 5 runs	Guyana; 3 wickets
Saint Lucia Kings	Saint Lucia; 6 wickets	Saint Lucia; 4 wickets		Saint Lucia; 7 wickets	Trinbago; 18 runs
St Kitts & Nevis Patriots	St Kitts; 6 wickets	Guyana; 5 wickets	Saint Lucia; 3 runs		Trinbago; 12 runs
Trinbago Knight Riders	Trinbago; 8 wickets	Trinbago; 6 wickets	Saint Lucia; 7 wickets	Trinbago; 12 runs	

Home team won	Visitor team won

- Note: Results listed are according to the home (horizontal) and visitor (vertical) teams.
- Note: Click on a result to see a summary of the match.

== Fixtures ==
The full schedule of the tournament was announced on 24 March 2025.

Match 1
14 August 2025
19:00 (N)
Scorecard

Antigua & Barbuda Falcons; 121 (17.1 overs)	v	St Kitts & Nevis Patriots (H); 125/4 (15 overs)
Karima Gore 61 (34); Waqar Salamkheil 4/22 (4 overs)		Alick Athanaze 37* (28); Rahkeem Cornwall 2/19 (3 overs)

St Kitts & Nevis Patriots won by 6 wickets
Warner Park Sporting Complex, St Kitts
Umpires: Gregory Brathwaite (WI) and Christopher Taylor (WI)
Player of the match: Waqar Salamkheil (St Kitts & Nevis Patriots)

- St Kitts & Nevis Patriots won the toss and elected to field.

Match 2
15 August 2025
19:00 (N)
Scorecard

St Kitts & Nevis Patriots (H); 153/8 (20 overs)	v	Guyana Amazon Warriors; 154/5 (17.2 overs)
Andre Fletcher 60 (41); Dwaine Pretorius 3/43 (4 overs)		Ben McDermott 75 (39); Abbas Afridi 2/24 (2 overs)

Guyana Amazon Warriors won by 5 wickets
Warner Park Sporting Complex, St Kitts
Umpires: Ryan Banwarie (WI) and Deighton Butler (WI)
Player of the match: Ben McDermott (Guyana Amazon Warriors)

- Guyana Amazon Warriors won the toss and elected to field.

Match 3
16 August 2025
19:00 (N)
Scorecard

Barbados Royals; 151/6 (20 overs)	v	Antigua & Barbuda Falcons (H); 152/4 (19.4 overs)
Quinton de Kock 57 (45); Jayden Seales 2/15 (4 overs)		Karima Gore 64* (53); Jomel Warrican 1/20 (4 overs)

Antigua & Barbuda Falcons won by 6 wickets
Sir Vivian Richards Stadium, Antigua
Umpires: Leslie Reifer (WI) and Carl Tuckett (WI)
Player of the match: Karima Gore (Antigua & Barbuda Falcons)

- Antigua & Barbuda Falcons won the toss and elected to field.

Match 4
17 August 2025
10:00
Scorecard

Trinbago Knight Riders; 231/5 (20 overs)	v	St Kitts & Nevis Patriots (H); 219/7 (20 overs)
Colin Munro 120 (57); Jason Holder 2/40 (4 overs)		Jason Holder 44 (22); Usman Tariq 4/33 (4 overs)

Trinbago Knight Riders won by 12 runs
Warner Park Sporting Complex, St Kitts
Umpires: Gregory Brathwaite (WI) and Christopher Taylor (WI)
Player of the match: Colin Munro (Trinbago Knight Riders)

- St Kitts & Nevis Patriots won the toss and elected to field.

Match 5
17 August 2025
19:00 (N)
Scorecard

Saint Lucia Kings	v	Antigua & Barbuda Falcons (H)

Match abandoned
Sir Vivian Richards Stadium, Antigua
Umpires: Chris Wright (WI) and Zahid Bassarath (WI)

- Antigua & Barbuda Falcons won the toss and elected to field.
- No play was possible due to rain.

Match 6
19 August 2025
19:00 (N)
Scorecard

Saint Lucia Kings; 200/8 (20 overs)	v	St Kitts & Nevis Patriots (H); 197/6 (20 overs)
Roston Chase 61 (38); Kyle Mayers 2/24 (3 overs)		Jason Holder 63 (29); Khary Pierre 2/25 (4 overs)

Saint Lucia Kings won by 3 runs
Warner Park Sporting Complex, St Kitts
Umpires: Deighton Butler (WI) and Ryan Banwarie (WI)
Player of the match: Roston Chase (Saint Lucia Kings)

- St Kitts & Nevis Patriots won the toss and elected to field.
- Navin Bidaisee (St Kitts & Nevis Patriots) made his T20 debut.

Match 7
20 August 2025
19:00 (N)
Scorecard

Antigua & Barbuda Falcons (H); 167/6 (20 overs)	v	Trinbago Knight Riders; 159/6 (20 overs)
Fabian Allen 45 (20); Usman Tariq 2/37 (4 overs)		Colin Munro 44 (18); Obed McCoy 4/39 (4 overs)

Antigua & Barbuda Falcons won by 8 runs
Sir Vivian Richards Stadium, Antigua
Umpires: Carl Tuckett (WI) and Leslie Reifer (WI)
Player of the match: Obed McCoy (Antigua & Barbuda Falcons)

- Trinbago Knight Riders won the toss and elected to field.

Match 8
21 August 2025
19:00 (N)
Scorecard

St Kitts & Nevis Patriots (H); 174/8 (20 overs)	v	Barbados Royals; 162 (18.2 overs)
Kyle Mayers 42 (28); Ramon Simmonds 3/26 (4 overs)		Kadeem Alleyne 42 (28); Jason Holder 4/14 (3.2 overs)

St Kitts & Nevis Patriots won by 12 runs
Warner Park Sporting Complex, St Kitts
Umpires: Christopher Taylor (WI) and Deighton Butler (WI)
Player of the match: Jason Holder (St Kitts & Nevis Patriots)

- Barbados Royals won the toss and elected to field.

Match 9
22 August 2025
19:00 (N)
Scorecard

Guyana Amazon Warriors; 211/3 (20 overs)	v	Antigua & Barbuda Falcons (H); 128 (15.2 overs)
Shai Hope 82 (54); Imad Wasim 1/20 (4 overs)		Karima Gore 31 (14); Imran Tahir 5/21 (4 overs)

Guyana Amazon Warriors won by 83 runs
Sir Vivian Richards Stadium, Antigua
Umpires: Zahid Bassarath (WI) and Chris Wright (WI)
Player of the match: Imran Tahir (Guyana Amazon Warriors)

- Guyana Amazon Warriors won the toss and elected to bat.

Match 10
23 August 2025
19:00 (N)
Scorecard

Trinbago Knight Riders; 183/7 (20 overs)	v	Saint Lucia Kings (H); 165/6 (20 overs)
Kieron Pollard 65 (29); Keon Gaston 2/38 (3 overs)		Johnson Charles 47 (37); Usman Tariq 2/20 (4 overs)

Trinbago Knight Riders won by 18 runs
Daren Sammy Cricket Ground, Saint Lucia
Umpires: Ryan Banwarie (WI) and Gregory Brathwaite (WI)
Player of the match: Kieron Pollard (Trinbago Knight Riders)

- Saint Lucia Kings won the toss and elected to field.

Match 11
24 August 2025
10:00
Scorecard

St Kitts & Nevis Patriots; 133/9 (20 overs)	v	Antigua & Barbuda Falcons (H); 137/3 (19.4 overs)
Evin Lewis 32 (31); Shakib Al Hasan 3/11 (2 overs)		Karima Gore 52* (47); Waqar Salamkheil 1/16 (4 overs)

Antigua & Barbuda Falcons won by 7 wickets
Sir Vivian Richards Stadium, Antigua
Umpires: Zahid Bassarath (WI) and Carl Tuckett (WI)
Player of the match: Shakib Al Hasan (Antigua & Barbuda Falcons)

- Antigua & Barbuda Falcons won the toss and elected to field.

Match 12
24 August 2025
19:00 (N)
Scorecard

Saint Lucia Kings (H)	v	Barbados Royals

Match abandoned
Daren Sammy Cricket Ground, Saint Lucia
Umpires: Gregory Brathwaite (WI) and Christopher Taylor (WI)

- Barbados Royals won the toss and elected to field.
- No play was possible due to rain.

Match 13
26 August 2025
19:00 (N)
Scorecard

Guyana Amazon Warriors; 202/6 (20 overs)	v	Saint Lucia Kings (H); 203/6 (18.1 overs)
Romario Shepherd 73* (34); Keon Gaston 2/57 (4 overs)		Ackeem Auguste 73 (35); Gudakesh Motie 2/32 (4 overs)

Saint Lucia Kings won by 4 wickets
Daren Sammy Cricket Ground, Saint Lucia
Umpires: Ryan Banwarie (WI) and Deighton Butler (WI)
Player of the match: Ackeem Auguste (Saint Lucia Kings)

- Guyana Amazon Warriors won the toss and elected to bat.

Match 14
27 August 2025
19:00 (N)
Scorecard

Antigua & Barbuda Falcons; 146/7 (20 overs)	v	Trinbago Knight Riders (H); 152/2 (18.4 overs)
Jewel Andrew 40 (31); Mohammad Amir 3/22 (4 overs)		Keacy Carty 60 (45); Shakib Al Hasan 1/25 (4 overs)

Trinbago Knight Riders won by 8 wickets
Brian Lara Cricket Academy, Trinidad
Umpires: Leslie Reifer (WI) and Chris Wright (WI)
Player of the match: Mohammad Amir (Trinbago Knight Riders)

- Trinbago Knight Riders won the toss and elected to field.

Match 15
28 August 2025
19:00 (N)
Scorecard

Saint Lucia Kings (H); 177/3 (20 overs)	v	St Kitts & Nevis Patriots; 180/3 (17 overs)
Mohammad Rizwan 60 (41); Tabraiz Shamsi 2/17 (4 overs)		Tim Seifert 68 (45); Naseem Shah 2/35 (4 overs)

Saint Lucia Kings won by 7 wickets
Daren Sammy Cricket Ground, Saint Lucia
Umpires: Deighton Butler (WI) and Christopher Taylor (WI)
Player of the match: Tabraiz Shamsi (Saint Lucia Kings)

- Saint Lucia Kings won the toss and elected to bat.

Match 16
29 August 2025
19:00 (N)
Scorecard

Barbados Royals; 178/6 (20 overs)	v	Trinbago Knight Riders (H); 179/3 (17.5 overs)
Sherfane Rutherford 45 (22); Andre Russell 3/37 (4 overs)		Colin Munro 67 (44); Jomel Warrican 1/24 (2 overs)

Trinbago Knight Riders won by 7 wickets
Brian Lara Cricket Academy, Trinidad
Umpires: Leslie Reifer (WI) and Carl Tuckett (WI)
Player of the match: Colin Munro (Trinbago Knight Riders)

- Trinbago Knight Riders won the toss and elected to field.

Match 17
30 August 2025
19:00 (N)
Scorecard

Guyana Amazon Warriors; 163/9 (20 overs)	v	Trinbago Knight Riders (H); 169/4 (17.2 overs)
Shai Hope 39 (29); Akeal Hosein 3/27 (4 overs)		Alex Hales 74 (43); Imran Tahir 4/27 (4 overs)

Trinbago Knight Riders won by 6 wickets
Brian Lara Cricket Academy, Trinidad
Umpires: Zahid Bassarath (WI) and Chris Wright (WI)
Player of the match: Akeal Hosein (Trinbago Knight Riders)

- Trinbago Knight Riders won the toss and elected to field.
- Quentin Sampson (Guyana Amazon Warriors) made his T20 debut.

Match 18
31 August 2025
11:00
Scorecard

Antigua & Barbuda Falcons; 204/4 (20 overs)	v	Saint Lucia Kings (H); 206/4 (17.5 overs)
Shakib Al Hasan 61 (26); Tabraiz Shamsi 3/30 (4 overs)		Tim Seifert 125* (53); Odean Smith 1/25 (2 overs)

Saint Lucia Kings won by 6 wickets
Daren Sammy Cricket Ground, Saint Lucia
Umpires: Ryan Banwarie (WI) and Gregory Brathwaite (WI)
Player of the match: Tim Seifert (Saint Lucia Kings)

- Saint Lucia Kings won the toss and elected to field.

Match 19
1 September 2025
11:00
Scorecard

Trinbago Knight Riders (H); 179/6 (20 overs)	v	St Kitts & Nevis Patriots; 167/6 (20 overs)
Kieron Pollard 65 (29); Jason Holder 2/25 (4 overs)		Andre Fletcher 67 (54); Nathan Edward 3/30 (3.2 overs)

Trinbago Knight Riders won by 12 runs
Brian Lara Cricket Academy, Trinidad
Umpires: Zahid Bassarath (WI) and Carl Tuckett (WI)
Player of the match: Kieron Pollard (Trinbago Knight Riders)

- St Kitts & Nevis Patriots won the toss and elected to field.

Match 20
3 September 2025
19:00 (N)
Scorecard

Trinbago Knight Riders (H); 109 (18.1 overs)	v	Saint Lucia Kings; 112/3 (11.1 overs)
Nicholas Pooran 30 (27); Tabraiz Shamsi 3/12 (4 overs)		Tim Seifert 36 (19); Sunil Narine 2/28 (4 overs)

Saint Lucia Kings won by 7 wickets
Brian Lara Cricket Academy, Trinidad
Umpires: Leslie Reifer (WI) and Chris Wright (WI)
Player of the match: Tabraiz Shamsi (Saint Lucia Kings)

- Saint Lucia Kings won the toss and elected to field.

Match 21
4 September 2025
19:00 (N)
Scorecard

Barbados Royals (H); 165/6 (20 overs)	v	Guyana Amazon Warriors; 170/6 (19.4 overs)
Rovman Powell 50* (28); Gudakesh Motie 2/16 (4 overs)		Shai Hope 62* (49); Eathan Bosch 3/35 (4 overs)

Guyana Amazon Warriors won by 4 wickets
Kensington Oval, Barbados
Umpires: Gregory Brathwaite (WI) and Christopher Taylor (WI)
Player of the match: Dwaine Pretorius (Guyana Amazon Warriors)

- Guyana Amazon Warriors won the toss and elected to field.

Match 22
5 September 2025
19:00 (N)
Scorecard

Barbados Royals (H); 187/4 (20 overs)	v	Antigua & Barbuda Falcons; 188/6 (20 overs)
Brandon King 98* (65); Salman Irshad 2/13 (4 overs)		Andries Gous 85* (53); Daniel Sams 3/29 (4 overs)

Antigua & Barbuda Falcons won by 4 wickets
Kensington Oval, Barbados
Umpires: Deighton Butler (WI) and Ryan Banwarie (WI)
Player of the match: Salman Irshad (Antigua & Barbuda Falcons)

- Antigua & Barbuda Falcons won the toss and elected to field.

Match 23
6 September 2025
19:00 (N)
Scorecard

Trinbago Knight Riders; 167/5 (20 overs)	v	Guyana Amazon Warriors (H); 168/7 (19.5 overs)
Kieron Pollard 54* (18); Moeen Ali 1/11 (4 overs)		Shai Hope 53 (46); Sunil Narine 2/12 (4 overs)

Guyana Amazon Warriors won by 3 wickets
Providence Stadium, Guyana
Umpires: Leslie Reifer (WI) and Carl Tuckett (WI)
Player of the match: Dwaine Pretorius (Guyana Amazon Warriors)

- Guyana Amazon Warriors won the toss and elected to field.

Match 24
7 September 2025
11:00
Scorecard

Barbados Royals (H); 191/5 (20 overs)	v	Saint Lucia Kings; 164/9 (20 overs)
Brandon King 42 (31); Tabraiz Shamsi 3/26 (4 overs)		Tim David 44 (28); Ramon Simmonds 3/28 (4 overs)

Barbados Royals won by 27 runs
Kensington Oval, Barbados
Umpires: Christopher Taylor (WI) and Gregory Brathwaite (WI)
Player of the match: Chris Green (Barbados Royals)

- St Lucia Kings won the toss and elected to field.

Match 25
7 September 2025
19:00 (N)
Scorecard

St Kitts & Nevis Patriots; 149/6 (20 overs)	v	Guyana Amazon Warriors (H); 144/8 (20 overs)
Mohammad Rizwan 85 (62); Hassan Khan 2/21 (4 overs)		Shai Hope 31 (27); Waqar Salamkheil 2/28 (4 overs)

St Kitts & Nevis Patriots won by 5 runs
Providence Stadium, Guyana
Umpires: Leslie Reifer (WI) and Chris Wright (WI)
Player of the match: Mohammad Rizwan (St Kitts & Nevis Patriots)

- Guyana Amazon Warriors won the toss and elected to field.

Match 26
10 September 2025
9:00 (N)
Scorecard

Guyana Amazon Warriors (H); 99 (18.1 overs)	v	Antigua & Barbuda Falcons; 103/6 (19.1 overs)
Shai Hope 26 (14); Jayden Seales 4/15 (3.1 overs)		Amir Jangoo 51* (57); Moeen Ali 2/10 (4 overs)

Antigua & Barbuda Falcons won by 4 wickets
Providence Stadium, Guyana
Umpires: Zahid Bassarath (WI) and Leslie Reifer (WI)
Player of the match: Jayden Seales (Antigua & Barbuda Falcons)

- Antigua & Barbuda Falcons won the toss and elected to field.

Match 27
11 September 2025
19:00 (N)
Scorecard

St Kitts & Nevis Patriots; 150/7 (20 overs)	v	Barbados Royals (H); 149/7 (20 overs)
Jason Holder 53* (30); Eathan Bosch 3/26 (3 overs)		Rassie van der Dussen 37* (27); Navin Bidaisee 2/24 (4 overs)

St Kitts & Nevis Patriots won by 1 run
Kensington Oval, Barbados
Umpires: Deighton Butler (WI) and Ryan Banwarie (WI)
Player of the match: Jason Holder (St Kitts & Nevis Patriots)

- Barbados Royals won the toss and elected to field.

Match 28
12 September 2025
20:00 (N)
Scorecard

Trinbago Knight Riders; 166/8 (20 overs)	v	Barbados Royals (H); 172/3 (19 overs)
Nicholas Pooran 45 (44); Chris Green 3/9 (4 overs)		Quinton de Kock 55 (35); Usman Tariq 2/23 (4 overs)

Barbados Royals won by 7 wickets
Kensington Oval, Barbados
Umpires: Gregory Brathwaite (WI) and Christopher Taylor (WI)
Player of the match: Chris Green (Barbados Royals)

- Barbados Royals won the toss and elected to field.
- Zishan Motara (Barbados Royals) made his T20 debut.

Match 29
13 September 2025
11:00
Scorecard

Saint Lucia Kings; 185/4 (20 overs)	v	Guyana Amazon Warriors (H); 188/8 (20 overs)
Roston Chase 90* (55); Dwaine Pretorius 2/36 (4 overs)		Quentin Sampson 76 (39); Roston Chase 3/30 (3 overs)

Guyana Amazon Warriors won by 2 wickets
Providence Stadium, Guyana
Umpires: Carl Tuckett (WI) and Chris Wright (WI)
Player of the match: Quentin Sampson (Guyana Amazon Warriors)

- Saint Lucia Kings won the toss and elected to bat.

Match 30
14 September 2025
19:00 (N)
Scorecard

Guyana Amazon Warriors (H); 189/6 (20 overs)	v	Barbados Royals; 125 (18.2 overs)
Shimron Hetmyer 68 (39); Sherfane Rutherford 2/35 (3 overs)		Sherfane Rutherford 27 (32); Gudakesh Motie 5/21 (3.2 overs)

Guyana Amazon Warriors won by 64 runs
Providence Stadium, Guyana
Umpires: Zahid Bassarath (WI) and Leslie Reifer (WI)
Player of the match: Shimron Hetmyer (Guyana Amazon Warriors)

- Barbados Royals won the toss and elected to field.
- Gudakesh Motie (Guyana Amazon Warriors) took his first five-wicket haul in T20s.

== Play-offs ==
Qualifier 1
17 September 2025 — Guyana
1	Saint Lucia Kings	143 (19.1 overs)
2	Guyana Amazon Warriors	157 (19.5 overs)
Eliminator
16 September 2025 — Guyana
3	Trinbago Knight Riders	168/1 (17.3 overs)
4	Antigua & Barbuda Falcons	166/8 (20 overs)

Qualifier 2
19 September 2025 — Guyana
Q1L	Saint Lucia Kings	138/8 (20 overs)
EW	Trinbago Knight Riders	194/4 (20 overs)

The Final
21 September 2025 — Guyana
Q1W	Guyana Amazon Warriors	130/8 (20 overs)
Q2W	Trinbago Knight Riders	133/7 (18 overs)

=== Eliminator ===
Eliminator
16 September 2025
20:00 (N)
Scorecard

Antigua & Barbuda Falcons; 166/8 (20 overs)	v	Trinbago Knight Riders; 168/1 (17.3 overs)
Andries Gous 61 (45); Saurabh Netravalkar 3/23 (4 overs)		Nicholas Pooran 90* (53); Rahkeem Cornwall 1/50 (4 overs)

Trinbago Knight Riders won by 9 wickets
Providence Stadium, Guyana
Umpires: Ryan Banwarie (WI) and Christopher Taylor (WI)
Player of the match: Nicholas Pooran (Trinbago Knight Riders)

- Trinbago Knight Riders won the toss and elected to field.

=== Qualifier 1 ===
Qualifier 1
17 September 2025
20:00 (N)
Scorecard

Guyana Amazon Warriors; 157 (19.5 overs)	v	Saint Lucia Kings; 143 (19.1 overs)
Ben McDermott 34 (27); Tabraiz Shamsi 3/33 (4 overs)		Khary Pierre 50 (29); Gudakesh Motie 4/30 (4 overs)

Guyana Amazon Warriors won by 14 runs
Providence Stadium, Guyana
Umpires: Gregory Brathwaite (WI) and Deighton Butler (WI)
Player of the match: Gudakesh Motie (Guyana Amazon Warriors)

- St Lucia Kings won the toss and elected to field.

=== Qualifier 2 ===
Qualifier 2
19 September 2025
20:00 (N)
Scorecard

Trinbago Knight Riders; 194/4 (20 overs)	v	Saint Lucia Kings; 138/8 (20 overs)
Alex Hales 58* (44); Roston Chase 1/16 (3 overs)		Tim Seifert 57 (40); Usman Tariq 4/35 (4 overs)

Trinbago Knight Riders won by 56 runs
Providence Stadium, Guyana
Umpires: Gregory Brathwaite (WI) and Deighton Butler (WI)
Player of the match: Nicholas Pooran (Trinbago Knight Riders)

- St Lucia Kings won the toss and elected to field.

=== Final ===
Final
21 September 2025
20:00 (N)
Scorecard

Guyana Amazon Warriors; 130/8 (20 overs)	v	Trinbago Knight Riders; 133/7 (18 overs)
Iftikhar Ahmed 30 (27); Saurabh Netravalkar 3/25 (4 overs)		Alex Hales 26 (34); Imran Tahir 3/34 (3 overs)

Trinbago Knight Riders won by 3 wickets
Providence Stadium, Guyana
Umpires: Gregory Brathwaite (WI) and Christopher Taylor (WI)
Player of the match: Akeal Hosein (Trinbago Knight Riders)

- Guyana Amazon Warriors won the toss and elected to bat.

== Statistics ==
=== Most runs ===
Runs	Player	Team
491	Shai Hope	Guyana Amazon Warriors
426	Nicholas Pooran	Trinbago Knight Riders
416	Colin Munro	Trinbago Knight Riders
396	Tim Seifert	Saint Lucia Kings
386	Alex Hales	Trinbago Knight Riders
Source: ESPNcricinfo | Updated: 21 September 2025

=== Most wickets ===
Wickets	Player	Team
23	Imran Tahir	Guyana Amazon Warriors
20	Usman Tariq	Trinbago Knight Riders
18	Gudakesh Motie	Guyana Amazon Warriors
17	Tabraiz Shamsi	Saint Lucia Kings
17	Dwaine Pretorius	Guyana Amazon Warriors
Source: ESPNcricinfo | Updated: 21 September 2025
