= Cameron Pennyfeather =

Kittitian cricketer (born 1998)

Personal information
- Full name: Kenneth Cameron Pennyfeather
- Born: 10 February 1998 (age 28); St Kitts
- Batting: Right-handed
- Bowling: Right-arm medium-fast

Domestic team information
- Years: Team
- 2017/18: Combined Campuses and Colleges
- 2024/25: Leeward Islands
- Source: CricketArchive, 11 May 2025

Kenneth Cameron Pennyfeather (born 10 February 1998) is a Kittitian cricketer. He made his List A debut for the UWI Vice Chancellor's XI against England on 25 February 2017.
