= Avinash Mahabirsingh =

Trinidadian cricketer

Personal information
- Born: 17 April 2001 (age 25); Trinidad
- Batting: Right-handed
- Bowling: Right-arm offbreak

Domestic team information
- Years: Team
- 2023/24–present: Combined Campuses and Colleges
- 2025: Windward Islands Infernos

Career statistics
Competition	FC
Matches	4
Runs scored	100
Batting average	20.00
100s/50s	0/0
Top score	33*
Balls bowled	604
Wickets	12
Bowling average	31.25
5 wickets in innings	1
10 wickets in match	0
Best bowling	8/51
Catches/stumpings	2/–
- Source: Cricinfo, 21 April 2025

Avinash Mahabirsingh (born 17 April 2001) is a Trinidadian cricketer who began playing first-class cricket for Combined Campuses and Colleges in the 2023–24 West Indies Championship.

Born in Trinidad, Mahabirsingh attended Naparima College in San Fernando. A right-arm off-spin bowler, he played under-age cricket for Trinidad and Tobago in Cricket West Indies tournaments from 2014 to 2017.

Mahabirsingh made his first-class debut in the final round of the 2023–24 West Indies Championship for Combined Campuses and Colleges against Guyana. He took 8 for 51 in the first innings. He is only the second bowler (after Virgil Browne in 2004) to take eight wickets in an innings on first-class debut in the West Indies Championship.
