= Tamarie Redwood =

West Indian cricketer

Personal information
- Full name: Tamarie Xavier Redwood
- Born: 16 February 2006 (age 20); Jamaica
- Batting: Right-handed
- Bowling: Right-arm leg-break
- Role: Bowler

Domestic team information
- Years: Team
- 2024–present: Jamaica
- Source: ESPNcricinfo, 13 February 2025

Tamarie Xavier Redwood (born 16 February 2006) is a West Indian cricketer who currently plays for the Jamaica national cricket team in West Indian domestic cricket as a bowler.

== Career ==
In November 2024, he made his List A debut against the West Indies Academy in the 2024–25 Super50 Cup. In January 2025, he made his first class debut against the Windward Islands in the 2024–25 West Indies Championship.
