= Khari Campbell =

West Indian cricketer (born 1998)

Personal information
- Full name: Khari Campbell
- Born: 21 March 1998 (age 28); Jamaica
- Batting: Right-handed
- Bowling: Right-arm medium
- Role: All-rounder

Domestic team information
- Years: Team
- 2024 — present: Saint Lucia Kings
- 2024 — present: Combined Campuses and Colleges
- Source: Cricinfo, 7 March 2025

Khari Campbell (born 21 March 1998) is a West Indian cricketer who made his debut playing for the Saint Lucia Kings. An all-rounder, he is a right handed batsman and right arm medium fast bowler.

== Career ==
In September 2024, He made his Twenty20 debut for the Saint Lucia Kings against the Trinbago Knight Riders in the 2024 Caribbean Premier League. In November 2024, He made his List A debut for the Combined Campuses and Colleges against in the 2024–25 Super50 Cup.
