= Michael Palmer (cricketer) =

West Indian cricketer

Personal information
- Full name: Michael Palmer
- Born: 26 May 2005 (age 21); Philipsburg, Sint Maarten
- Batting: Right-handed
- Bowling: Right-arm fast medium
- Role: Batting All-Rounder

Domestic team information
- Years: Team
- 2024 - present: West Indies Academy

Career statistics
Competition	FC	LA
Matches	1	1
Runs scored	5	-
Batting average	5.00	-
100s/50s	-/-	-/-
Top score	5	-
Balls bowled	20	-
Wickets	2	-
Bowling average	35.00	-
5 wickets in innings	-	-
10 wickets in match	-	-
Best bowling	1/14	0/65
Catches/stumpings	2/-	-/-
- Source: Cricinfo, 31 January 2025

Michael Palmer (born 26 May 2005) is a West Indian cricketer. He made his List A debut for the West Indies Academy on 17 November 2024 in the 2024–25 Super50 Cup tournament, and his first-class debut on 29 January 2025 in the 2024–25 West Indies Championship.

== International career ==
Michael is eligible to play for the Netherlands national cricket team.
