= Stephan Pascal =

West Indian cricketer

Personal information
- Full name: Stephan Pascal
- Born: 16 October 2005 (age 21); Dominica
- Batting: Right-handed
- Bowling: Right-arm off-spin
- Role: Wicket-keeper

Domestic team information
- Years: Team
- 2024–present: Windward Islands

Career statistics
Competition	FC	LA
Matches	7	4
Runs scored	254	88
Batting average	21.16	22.00
100s/50s	0/1	0/0
Top score	63	47
Catches/stumpings	5/0	1/0
- Source: ESPNcricinfo, 13 February 2025

Stephan Pascal (born 16 October 2005) is a West Indian cricketer who currently plays for the Windward Islands in West Indian domestic cricket as a wicket-keeper batsman. He was the captain of the West Indies Under-19 squad that participated in the 2024 Under-19 Men's Cricket World Cup.

== Career ==
In April 2024, he made his first class debut for the Windward Islands against the West Indies Academy in the 2023–24 West Indies Championship. In October 2024, he also made his List A debut for Windward Islands against Guyana in the 2024–25 Super50 Cup.
