= Chaim Holder =

Barbadian cricketer (born 1994)

Personal information
- Born: 17 May 1994 (age 32)
- Batting: Right handed
- Bowling: Right arm Offbreak

Domestic team information
- Years: Team
- 2013: Combined Campuses and Colleges
- 2018: Leeward Islands
- 2019 - Present: Barbados

Career statistics
| Competition | FC | List A |
|---|---|---|
| Matches | 19 | 1 |
| Runs scored | 253 | 2 |
| Batting average | 10.54 | - |
| 100s/50s | 0/0 | 0/0 |
| Top score | 43 | 2* |
| Balls bowled | 3,152 | 30 |
| Wickets | 63 | 1 |
| Bowling average | 25.26 | 17.00 |
| 5 wickets in innings | 3 | 0 |
| 10 wickets in match | 0 | 0 |
| Best bowling | 6/70 | 1/17 |
| Catches/stumpings | 11/0 | 0/0 |
- Source: Cricinfo, 31 March 2025

Chaim Holder (born 17 May 1994) is a Barbadian cricketer. He made his first-class debut for the Leeward Islands in the 2017–18 Regional Four Day Competition on 4 January 2018.
