= Akeem Jordan (cricketer) =

West Indian cricketer (born 1994)

Personal information
- Born: 18 October 1994 (age 32); Barbados
- Batting: Right-handed
- Bowling: Right-arm fast-medium
- Role: Bowler

International information
- National side: West Indies
- ODI debut (cap 218): 6 June 2023 v UAE
- Last ODI: 9 June 2023 v UAE

Domestic team information
- Years: Team
- 2018/19–2019/20: Combined Campuses and Colleges
- 2019: St Kitts & Nevis Patriots
- 2020/21–present: Barbados
- 2023: Barbados Tridents
- 2024: Kent

Career statistics
Competition	ODI	FC	LA	T20
Matches	2	21	38	3
Runs scored	3	533	301	–
Batting average	–	17.76	16.72	–
100s/50s	0/0	0/1	0/0	–
Top score	3*	54	40	–
Balls bowled	66	3,494	1,711	48
Wickets	1	75	50	5
Bowling average	56.00	24.69	27.56	17.00
5 wickets in innings	0	3	3	0
10 wickets in match	0	0	0	0
Best bowling	1/36	5/44	5/18	4/33
Catches/stumpings	2/–	16/–	20/–	1/–
- Source: CricInfo, 30 September 2024

Akeem Jordan (born 18 October 1994) is a West Indian cricketer. He made his List A debut for Combined Campuses and Colleges in the 2018–19 Regional Super50 tournament on 4 October 2018. In the semi-final of the tournament, he took a five-wicket haul against Trinidad and Tobago to help Combined Campuses and Colleges progress to the final.

He made his Twenty20 debut on 15 September 2019, for the St Kitts & Nevis Patriots, in the 2019 Caribbean Premier League. The following month, he was named in the Combined Campuses' squad for the 2019–20 Regional Super50 tournament. He was the leading wicket-taker for Combined Campuses, and Colleges in the tournament, with 16 dismissals in eight matches.

He made his first-class debut on 18 May 2022, for Barbados in the 2021–22 West Indies Championship.

On 21 August 2024 he signed for Kent for a period covering four matches of the 2024 County Championship.

== International career ==
In February 2023, Jordan was selected in West Indies Test squad for the South Africa series.

In May 2023, he was named in West Indies One Day International (ODI) squad for the series against United Arab Emirates. He made his ODI debut in the second ODI of the series, on 6 June 2023.
