= Romaine Morrison =

Jamaican cricketer (born 1995)

Personal information
- Full name: Romaine Morrison
- Born: 12 October 1995 (age 31); Jamaica
- Source: Cricinfo, 27 October 2017

Romaine Morrison (born 12 October 1995) is a Jamaican cricketer. He made his first-class debut for Jamaica in the 2017–18 Regional Four Day Competition on 26 October 2017. In October 2019, he was named in the Combined Campuses' squad for the 2019–20 Regional Super50 tournament. He made his List A debut on 6 November 2019, for Combined Campuses and Colleges in the 2019–20 Regional Super50 tournament.
