= Cephas Cooper =

Trinidadian cricketer (born 1999)

Personal information
- Full name: Cephas Lenard Cooper
- Born: 11 July 1999 (age 27); Trinidad
- Batting: Right handed
- Bowling: Right arm Offbreak

Domestic team information
- Years: Team
- 2018: West Indies B
- 2020–present: Trinidad and Tobago
- 2025: Trinidad & Tobago Legions

Career statistics
Competition	FC	LA
Matches	13	2
Runs scored	574	13
Batting average	28.70	6.50
100s/50s	1/4	0/0
Top score	117	10
Catches/stumpings	11/–	2/–
- Source: Cricinfo, 20 April 2025

Cephas Cooper (born 11 July 1999) is a Trinidadian cricketer. He made his List A debut for West Indies B in the 2018–19 Regional Super50 tournament on 11 October 2018. Prior to his List A debut, he was named in the West Indies' squad for the 2018 Under-19 Cricket World Cup. He made his first-class debut on 5 March 2020, for Trinidad and Tobago in the 2019–20 West Indies Championship.

Cooper attended Naparima College in San Fernando, Trinidad and Tobago, and was captain of cricket. He scored 297 for his school out of a record-breaking 506 for four in 50 overs in 2019.
