= Pete Salmon =

Jamaican cricketer (born 1992)

Personal information
- Born: 2 October 1992 (age 34)
- Source: Cricinfo, 3 February 2018

Pete Salmon (born 2 October 1992) is a Jamaican cricketer. He made his List A debut for Jamaica in the 2017–18 Regional Super50 on 2 February 2018. He made his first-class debut on 6 February 2020, for Jamaica in the 2019–20 West Indies Championship. He took seven wickets in the second innings of the match. However, later the same month, Cricket West Indies suspended Salmon from bowling in domestic matches for an illegal bowling action.
