= Shian Brathwaite =

Barbadian cricketer (born 1999)

Personal information
- Born: 4 October 1999 (age 27); Barbados
- Source: ESPNcricinfo, 26 January 2017

Shian Brathwaite (born 4 October 1999) is a Barbadian cricketer. He made his List A debut for the West Indies Under-19s in the 2016–17 Regional Super50 on 25 January 2017.
