= Raymond Perez =

Guyanese cricketer

Personal information
- Full name: Raymond Peter Perez
- Born: 22 June 1999 (age 27); Guyana
- Batting: Right-handed

Domestic team information
- Years: Team
- 2023–24: Guyana

Career statistics
Competition	FC
Matches	11
Runs scored	524
Batting average	32.75
100s/50s	0/3
Top score	82
Catches/stumpings	9/–
- Source: Cricinfo, 11 May 2025

Raymond Peter Perez (born 22 June 1999) is a Guyanese cricketer who began playing first-class cricket for Guyana in the 2023–24 season.

Perez is a right-handed opening or number three batsman. He played under-age cricket for Guyana in Cricket West Indies tournaments from 2013 to 2017. In early 2024 he showed good batting form in the trial matches that were held to help select the Guyana team for the first-class West Indies Championship. In April, in the fifth match of the competition, he scored 62 and 79, the two highest individual scores in the match, when Guyana beat Combined Campuses and Colleges.
