= Sir Frank Worrell Memorial Ground =

Cricket stadium in Trinidad and Tobago

Coordinates: 10.6513°N 61.3985°W

The Sir Frank Worrell Memorial Ground is a cricket stadium in Saint Augustine, Trinidad and Tobago.

The stadium is named after Frank Worrell, a West Indies cricketer. First-class cricket was played on the ground three times during the 1970s, during which time it was used as a home ground for East Trinidad. In preparation for the 2007 Cricket World Cup, $1.5 million was spent on refurbishing the ground, which was used for four warm-up matches for the tournament. The ground has been used intermittently as a first-class venue since then, including the semi-final of the 2010–11 Regional Four Day Competition.
