= Ronaldo Alimohamed =

West Indian cricketer (born 1998)

Personal information
- Full name: Ronaldo Jonathan Alimohamed
- Born: 3 October 1998 (age 28)
- Batting: Right handed
- Bowling: Right arm Fast medium
- Role: Bowling Allrounder

Domestic team information
- Years: Team
- 2019–present: Guyana
- 2026: Guyana Amazon Warriors

Career statistics
Competition	FC	LA
Matches	13	7
Runs scored	391	79
Batting average	26.06	15.80
100s/50s	0/2	0/0
Top score	77	27
Balls bowled	1399	147
Wickets	40	3
Bowling average	19.55	54.66
5 wickets in innings	3	0
10 wickets in match	0	0
Best bowling	6/17	1/33
Catches/stumpings	8/–	7/–
- Source: Cricinfo, 20 April 2025

Ronaldo Alimohamed (born 3 October 1998) is a Guyanese cricketer. He made his List A debut on 23 November 2019, for Guyana in the 2019–20 Regional Super50 tournament. Prior to his List A debut, he was named in the West Indies' squad for the 2018 Under-19 Cricket World Cup.
