= Darel Cyrus =

Grenadian cricketer

Personal information
- Full name: Darel Quincy Dominique Cyrus
- Born: 10 September 1996 (age 30); Grenada
- Batting: Right-handed
- Bowling: Right-arm leg-spin
- Role: Bowler

Domestic team information
- Years: Team
- 2023/24–: Windward Islands
- 2025: Windward Islands Infernos

Career statistics
| Competition | FC | LA |
|---|---|---|
| Matches | 12 | 14 |
| Runs scored | 107 | 110 |
| Batting average | 8.23 | 13.75 |
| 100s/50s | 0/0 | 0/0 |
| Top score | 23 | 29 |
| Balls bowled | 1,893 | 595 |
| Wickets | 38 | 18 |
| Bowling average | 27.00 | 28.05 |
| 5 wickets in innings | 3 | 0 |
| 10 wickets in match | 0 | – |
| Best bowling | 6/72 | 4/54 |
| Catches/stumpings | 7/– | 8/– |
- Source: Cricinfo, 30 June 2025

Darel Quincy Dominique Cyrus (born 10 September 1996) is a Grenadian cricketer who has played first-class and List A cricket for Windward Islands since the 2022–23 season.

== Cricket career ==
A right-arm leg-spin bowler from Grenada, Cyrus played under-age cricket for Grenada before making his List A debut for Windward Islands in the 2022–23 season. He made his first-class debut in the West Indies Championship in 2023–24, and took 6 for 72 against Combined Campuses and Colleges in the first innings of his second match, and 5 for 67 a month later in the first innings against Guyana.
