= Jonathan Drakes =

Barbadian cricketer (born 1994)

Personal information
- Full name: Jonathan Andrew Drakes
- Born: 11 October 1994 (age 32); Bridgetown, Barbados
- Batting: Right-handed
- Role: Batsman

Domestic team information
- Years: Team
- 2018/19–: Combined Campuses and Colleges
- 2020/21–: Barbados

Career statistics
| Competition | First-class | List A |
|---|---|---|
| Matches | 19 | 24 |
| Runs scored | 1,080 | 552 |
| Batting average | 34.83 | 26.28 |
| 100s/50s | 3/4 | 0/3 |
| Top score | 117 | 70 |
| Catches/stumpings | 8/– | 13/– |
- Source: Cricinfo, 11 May 2025

Jonathan Andrew Drakes (born 11 October 1994) is a Barbadian cricketer. He made his List A debut for Combined Campuses and Colleges in the 2018–19 Regional Super50 tournament on 10 October 2018. Prior to his List A debut, he was named in the West Indies' squad for the 2014 Under-19 Cricket World Cup. In October 2019, he was named in the Combined Campuses' squad for the 2019–20 Regional Super50 tournament.
