= Brad Barnes =

West Indian cricketer (born 1998)

Personal information
- Born: 11 February 1998 (age 28)
- Source: Cricinfo, 16 October 2018

Brad Barnes (born 11 February 1998) is a Jamaican cricketer. He made his List A debut for West Indies B in the 2018–19 Regional Super50 tournament on 15 October 2018. Prior to his List A debut, he was named in the West Indies' squad for the 2018 Under-19 Cricket World Cup. He made his first-class debut for Jamaica on 29 March 2023, against Trinidad and Tobago in the 2022–23 West Indies Championship.
