= Gordon Bryan (cricketer) =

Jamaican cricketer (born 1992)

Personal information
- Full name: Gordon Bryan
- Born: 1992 (age 33–34)
- Source: Cricinfo, 5 October 2018

Gordon Bryan (born 1992) is a Jamaican cricketer. He made his List A debut for Jamaica in the 2018–19 Regional Super50 tournament on 4 October 2018. He made his first-class debut for Jamaica in the 2018–19 Regional Four Day Competition on 28 February 2019.
