= Abhijai Mansingh =

West Indian cricketer (born 1997)

Personal information
- Born: 17 April 1997 (age 29); Jamaica

Career statistics
Competition	FC	LA
Matches	5	6
Runs scored	248	55
Batting average	27.55	52.88
100s/50s	0/3	0/0
Top score	62*	21*
Balls bowled	703	210
Wickets	12	3
Bowling average	29.33	60.66
5 wickets in innings	-	-
10 wickets in match	-	-
Best bowling	3/47	2/54
Catches/stumpings	2/–	2/–
- Source: Cricinfo, 1 April 2023

Abhijai Mansingh (born 17 April 1997) is a Jamaican cricketer. He made his List A debut on 9 November 2019, for Combined Campuses and Colleges in the 2019–20 Regional Super50 tournament. He was in the Jamaica Tallawahs squad for the 2021 Caribbean Premier League season, but did not play any games.

== Personal life ==
Mansighn was born in Jamaica. His grand father moved to Jamaica from Canada. He holds dual citizenship in both Jamaica and Canada.
