= Shadrack Descarte =

West Indian cricketer

Personal information
- Full name: Shadrack Descarte
- Born: 18 October 1997 (age 29); Castries, St. Lucia
- Batting: Left-handed
- Bowling: Right-arm medium-fast
- Role: All-rounder

Domestic team information
- Years: Team
- 2022–present: Windward Islands
- 2023–present: Saint Lucia Kings
- 2025: Windward Islands Infernos

Career statistics
Competition	FC	LA	T20
Matches	8	14	11
Runs scored	347	180	86
Batting average	26.69	15.00	9.55
100s/50s	1/1	0/2	0/0
Top score	119	60	43
Balls bowled	637	205	81
Wickets	13	13	4
Bowling average	29.30	24.61	29.75
5 wickets in innings	0	0	0
10 wickets in match	0	0	0
Best bowling	3/58	4/43	1/11
Catches/stumpings	6/–	4/–	7/–
- Source: Cricinfo, 13 April 2025

Shadrack Descarte (born 18 October 1997) is a West Indian cricketer who currently plays for the Windward Islands cricket team as a batting all-rounder.

== Career ==
In October 2022, he made his List A debut playing for Windward Islands against Guyana in the 2022–23 Super50 Cup. In August 2023, he made his Twenty20 debut for Saint Lucia Kings against Barbados Royals in the 2023 Caribbean Premier League. In February 2024, he made his first class debut for Windward Islands against Jamaica in the 2023–24 West Indies Championship.
