= Marquino Mindley =

West Indian cricketer (born 1994)

Personal information
- Full name: Marquino Junior Mindley
- Born: 29 December 1994 (age 31)
- Batting: Right-handed
- Bowling: Right-arm Fast medium
- Role: Bowler

International information
- National side: West Indies (2022–2024)
- Only Test (cap 332): 8 December 2022 v Australia
- Only ODI (cap 225): 10 December 2024 v Bangladesh

Domestic team information
- Years: Team
- 2015–2018, 2020–: Jamaica
- 2018–2019: Barbados

Career statistics
Competition	Test	ODI	FC	LA
Matches	1	1	60	26
Runs scored	11	0	576	130
Batting average	11.00	–	8.34	21.66
100s/50s	0/0	0/0	0/0	0/0
Top score	11*	–	43	27
Balls bowled	12	42	7647	1048
Wickets	0	1	152	40
Bowling average	–	45.00	22.96	20.97
5 wickets in innings	0	0	7	1
10 wickets in match	0	0	0	–
Best bowling	–	1/45	6/54	5/28
Catches/stumpings	0/–	0/–	25/–	4/–
- Source: ESPNcricinfo, 3 December 2025

Marquino Mindley (born 29 December 1994) is a Jamaican cricketer who plays international cricket for the West Indies cricket team. He was part of the West Indies' squad for the 2014 ICC Under-19 Cricket World Cup. In May 2018, he was selected to play for the Barbados national cricket team in the Professional Cricket League draft, ahead of the 2018–19 season. In October 2019, he was named in Jamaica's squad for the 2019–20 Regional Super50 tournament. He made his Test debut in December 2022.

In June 2020, Mindley was named as one of eleven reserve players in the West Indies' Test squad, for their series against England. The Test series was originally scheduled to start in May 2020, but was moved back to July 2020 due to the COVID-19 pandemic.
