= Kenneth Dember =

West Indian cricketer

Personal information
- Full name: Kenneth Dember
- Batting: Right-handed
- Bowling: Right-arm offbreak
- Role: Bowler

Domestic team information
- Years: Team
- 2017-: Windward Islands
- First-class debut: 30 November 2017 Windward Islands v Jamaica
- Last First-class: 12 March 2020 Windward Islands v Trinidad and Tobago
- List A debut: 13 February 2021 Northern Windwards v Trinidad and Tobago

Career statistics
Competition	FC	LA
Matches	5	2
Runs scored	59	13
Batting average	6.55	6.50
100s/50s	0/0	0/0
Top score	12	8
Balls bowled	636	75
Wickets	7	1
Bowling average	46.28	61.00
5 wickets in innings	0	0
10 wickets in match	0	0
Best bowling	3/9	1/34
Catches/stumpings	3/–	0/–
- Source: Cricinfo, 10 October 2021

Kenneth Dember is a West Indian cricketer. He made his first-class debut for the Windward Islands in the 2017–18 Regional Four Day Competition on 30 November 2017. He made his List A debut on 13 February 2021, for the Windward Islands, in the 2020–21 Super50 Cup.
