= Bryan Charles =

West Indian cricketer (born 1995)

Personal information
- Full name: Bryan Nigel Lennox Charles
- Born: 9 June 1995 (age 31); Trinidad
- Batting: Right-handed
- Bowling: Right-arm Off break
- Role: Bowler

Domestic team information
- Years: Team
- 2015–present: Trinidad and Tobago
- 2024: Trinbago Knight Riders

Career statistics
Competition	First-class	List A
Matches	51	13
Runs scored	566	46
Batting average	10.10	9.20
100s/50s	0/0	0/0
Top score	43	32*
Balls bowled	9,135	576
Wickets	165	13
Bowling average	27.24	32.23
5 wickets in innings	8	0
10 wickets in match	1	0
Best bowling	7/43	3/48
Catches/stumpings	57/–	4/–
- Source: ESPNcricinfo, 20 April 2025

Bryan Charles (born 9 June 1995) is a West Indian cricketer. He was part of the West Indies' squad for the 2014 ICC Under-19 Cricket World Cup. He made his List A debut for West Indies B in the 2018–19 Regional Super50 tournament on 3 October 2018.

A right-arm off-spin bowler and tail-end batsman, Charles was selected by Trinidad and Tobago in the players' draft hosted by Cricket West Indies ahead of the 2020–21 domestic season. In April 2024 he took 6 for 82 and 7 for 43 when Trinidad and Tobago defeated Jamaica by an innings in the West Indies Championship.
