= Nathan Edward =

West Indian cricketer (born 2005)

Personal information
- Born: 29 May 2005 (age 21); St Maarten
- Batting: Left-handed
- Bowling: Left-arm fast-medium
- Role: All rounder

Domestic team information
- Years: Team
- 2024–present: Trinbago Knight Riders

Career statistics
Competition	FC	List A	T20
Matches	6	8	6
Runs scored	103	98	27
Batting average	14.71	16.33	27.00
100s/50s	0/0	0/0	0/0
Top score	37	49	17
Balls bowled	716	245	103
Wickets	17	7	10
Bowling average	27.17	37.14	17.20
5 wickets in innings	1	0	0
10 wickets in match	0	–	–
Best bowling	6/23	2/28	3/19
Catches/stumpings	4/–	2/–	2/–
- Source: ESPNcricinfo, 29 December 2025

Nathan Edward (born 29 May 2005) is a West Indian cricketer who plays for the Trinbago Knight Riders. An all-rounder, he is a left handed batsman and left arm medium fast bowler.

== Career ==
He was part of Bahawalpur Royals' championship-winning side in the Pakistan Junior League in 2022. That year, he represented the West Indies national under-19 cricket team at the 2022 Under-19 Cricket World Cup.

He also played at the 2024 Under-19 Cricket World Cup in South Africa, where he was named in the team-of-the-tournament.

In 2024, he signed a contract with the Leeward Islands cricket team. He was drafted into the Caribbean Premier League by Trinbago Knight Riders in July 2024. He subsequently made his debut in the Caribbean Premier League for Trinbago Knight Riders against Saint Kitts and Nevis Patriots on 31 August 2024.

== Personal life ==
Edward was born in St Maarten.
