= Javelle Glen =

Jamaican cricketer (born 1998)

Personal information
- Born: 26 February 1998 (age 28)
- Batting: Left-handed
- Bowling: Right-arm leg-break
- Role: All-rounder

Domestic team information
- Years: Team
- 2019: Jamaica Tallawahs
- 2020-present: St Lucia Zouks (squad no. 31)
- 2021-: Jamaica

Career statistics
Competition	LA	T20
Matches	3	13
Runs scored	22	133
Batting average	7.33	16.62
100s/50s	0/0	0/0
Top score	13	34*
Balls bowled	12	60
Wickets	0	7
Bowling average	–	8.42
5 wickets in innings	0	0
10 wickets in match	–	0
Best bowling	–/–	3/16
Catches/stumpings	2/–	2/–
- Source: Cricinfo, 31 March 2021

Javelle Glen (born 26 February 1998) is a Jamaican cricketer. He made his Twenty20 debut on 13 September 2019, for the Jamaica Tallawahs, in the 2019 Caribbean Premier League. In July 2020, he was named in the St Lucia Zouks squad for the 2020 Caribbean Premier League. He made his List A debut on 16 February 2021, for Jamaica, in the 2020–21 Super50 Cup.
