= Zishan Motara =

Barbadian cricketer

Personal information
- Full name: Zishan Yusuf Motara
- Born: 14 July 2006 (age 20); Barbados
- Batting: Right-handed
- Bowling: Right-arm Legbreak
- Role: Bowler

International information
- National side: West Indies (2025)
- Only T20I (cap 108): 29 September 2025 v Nepal

Domestic team information
- Years: Team
- 2023/24: Combined Campuses and Colleges
- 2024/25: West Indies Academy
- 2025–present: Barbados Royals

Career statistics
Competition	T20I	FC	LA	T20
Matches	1	10	7	3
Runs scored	3	236	14	3
Batting average	3.00	15.73	3.50	1.50
100s/50s	0/0	0/1	0/0	0/0
Top score	3	56	5	3
Balls bowled	6	1213	384	42
Wickets	0	25	9	1
Bowling average	–	33.24	27.44	79.00
5 wickets in innings	0	1	0	0
10 wickets in match	–	0	–	–
Best bowling	–	7/108	3/19	1/39
Catches/stumpings	0/–	6/–	3/–	0/–
- Source: Cricinfo, 22 December 2025

Zishan Yusuf Motara (born 14 July 2006) is a Barbadian cricketer who began playing first-class cricket for Combined Campuses and Colleges in the 2023–24 season. In 2025 he represented Barbados Royals in the Caribbean Premier League.

Motara attends Barbados Community College. A right-arm leg-spin bowler and useful lower-order batsman, he was 17 years old when he made his first-class debut in the West Indies Championship in 2023–24. He took 7 for 108 for Combined Campuses and Colleges against Jamaica in the first innings of his second match.
