= Jeavor Royal =

Jamaican cricketer (born 1998)

Personal information
- Born: 2 December 1998 (age 27); Jamaica
- Batting: Right-handed
- Bowling: Slow left-arm Orthodox
- Role: Bowler

Career statistics
Competition	FC	LA	T20
Matches	1	22	23
Runs scored	77	748	427
Batting average	38.5	37.4	22.47
100s/50s	0/0	0/0	0/0
Top score	27	44*	12*
Balls bowled	185	1077	332
Wickets	2	20	19
Bowling average	15.5	20.54	6.5
5 wickets in innings	0	0	0
10 wickets in match	0	0	0
Best bowling	2/60	3/33	3/19
Catches/stumpings	0/–	11/–	12/–
- Source: ESPNcricinfo, 7 January 2024

Jeavor Royal (born 2 December 1998) is a Jamaican cricketer. He made his List A debut for the West Indies Under-19s in the 2016–17 Regional Super50 on 10 February 2017. In November 2017, he was named in the West Indies squad for the 2018 Under-19 Cricket World Cup.

He made his Twenty20 debut on 21 September 2019, for the St Lucia Zouks, in the 2019 Caribbean Premier League. In July 2020, he was named in the Jamaica Tallawahs squad for the 2020 Caribbean Premier League. He was later named as part of the St Lucia Stars
