= Tevin Imlach =

West Indian cricketer (born 1996)

Personal information
- Full name: Tevin Adrian Imlach
- Born: 30 November 1996 (age 29)
- Batting: Right-handed
- Role: Wicket-keeper

International information
- National side: West Indies (2025–present)
- Test debut (cap 341): 17 January 2025 v Pakistan
- Last Test: 18 December 2025 v New Zealand

Domestic team information
- Years: Team
- 2018–present: Guyana

Career statistics
Competition	Test	FC	LA
Matches	6	36	34
Runs scored	169	1,906	1,006
Batting average	15.36	33.43	35.92
100s/50s	0/0	6/8	0/7
Top score	35	136*	80
Catches/stumpings	18/2	77/8	22/2
- Source: ESPNcricinfo, 29 December 2025

Tevin Adrian Imlach (born 30 November 1996) is a Guyanese cricketer who has played Test cricket for the West Indies cricket team as a wicket-keeper.

== Domestic career ==
He made his List A debut for West Indies B in the 2018–19 Regional Super50 tournament on 3 October 2018. Prior to his List A debut, he was named in the West Indies squad for the 2016 Under-19 Cricket World Cup.

He made his first-class debut for Guyana in the 2018–19 Regional Four Day Competition on 6 December 2018. In June 2020, he was selected by Guyana, in the players' draft hosted by Cricket West Indies ahead of the 2020–21 domestic season.

== International career ==
He made his Test debut for the West Indies against Pakistan on 17 January 2025 in Multan.
