= Joshua James (cricketer) =

Trinidadian cricketer (born 2001)

Personal information
- Full name: Joshua Michael James
- Born: 21 February 2001 (age 25); Trinidad and Tobago
- Batting: Right-handed
- Bowling: Right-arm medium

Domestic team information
- Years: Team
- 2021-2022: Jamaica Tallawahs (squad no. 51)
- 2024: Antigua and Barbuda Falcons
- 2024/25–: Trinidad and Tobago national cricket team

Career statistics
| Competition | FC | LA | T20 |
|---|---|---|---|
| Matches | 13 | 16 | 6 |
| Runs scored | 383 | 180 | 19 |
| Batting average | 19.15 | 25.71 | 19.00 |
| 100s/50s | 0/1 | 0/1 | 0/0 |
| Top score | 58 | 73 | 15 |
| Balls bowled | 1215 | 504 | 54 |
| Wickets | 26 | 15 | 2 |
| Bowling average | 22.73 | 30.73 | 30.50 |
| 5 wickets in innings | 0 | 0 | 0 |
| 10 wickets in match | 0 | – | – |
| Best bowling | 4/43 | 3/19 | 1/1 |
| Catches/stumpings | 8/– | 5/– | 2/– |
- Source: Cricinfo, 27 December 2025

Joshua James (born 21 February 2001) is a Tobagonian cricketer. In August 2021, he was named in the Jamaica Tallawahs' squad for the 2021 Caribbean Premier League. He made his Twenty20 debut on 1 September 2021, for the Jamaica Tallawahs in the 2021 Caribbean Premier League. Prior to his Twenty20 debut, he was part of the West Indies' squad for the 2020 Under-19 Cricket World Cup.
