= Combined Campuses and Colleges cricket team =

Cricket team

Combined Campuses and Colleges
Team information
- Colours: Blue
- Founded: 2007
- Home ground: Three Ws Oval, Bridgetown
- Capacity: 20,000

History
- Four Day wins: 0
- Super50 Cup wins: 1
- CT20 wins: 0
- Official website: CCC

Combined Campuses and Colleges (CCC) is a first-class and List A cricket team composed of West Indian collegiate and university students. The team competes in the Regional Four Day Competition and the Regional Super50. The CCC won the 2018–19 Regional Super50, their only major title so far.

== Team history ==
Effectively a continuation of the previous University of the West Indies cricket team, the team was created for the 2007/08 season and played their first matches in the KFC Cup one-day competition in October 2007. CCC made their four-day debut in the Carib Beer Cup in January 2008, they finished their maiden season with one win from six matches, finishing bottom of the league. In their second season of the four-day competition they improved, winning four out of 12 matches and finishing on an equal number of points with Barbados.

In 2011, CCC had a good first-class season in which they reached the final along with Jamaica. It was CCC's best performance thus far in the competition. They progressed to the final by posting victories against Barbados, the Leeward Islands, the Windward Islands and Guyana. However, CCC were no match for a strong Jamaica team, who won easily. In the 2012 Caribbean 4-day competition, CCC dismissed the Leeward Islands for 39 en route to winning by an innings and 15 runs.

In July 2014, the WICB announced that the CCC cricket team was to be excluded from the upcoming 2014-15 Regional Four Day competition as part of a series of changes adopted based on the recommendations made in a report presented by Richard Pybus, WICB's director of cricket, in March 2014.

In 2017 a similar team by nature (with some of the same players) as the CCC, called the Combined Universities and Campuses (CUC) made its debut in Jamaica's new premier two-day domestic cricket competition, the Jamaica Cricket Association Super League.

In October 2018, they beat Trinidad and Tobago in the final of the 2018–19 Regional Super50 to win their first title in the competition.

== Honours ==
- Domestic one-day competition (1):
  - 2018-19

== Grounds ==
Combined Campuses and Colleges cricket team main ground is at Three Ws Oval in Bridgetown
