= 2026 Caribbean Premier League =

Fourteenth season of the Caribbean Premier League

- Dates: 7 August – 20 September 2026
- Administrator: Cricket West Indies
- Cricket format: Twenty20
- Tournament format(s): Round-robin and playoffs
- Hosts: Various: Antigua and Barbuda; Barbados; Guyana; Jamaica; Saint Kitts and Nevis; Saint Lucia; Saint Vincent and the Grenadines; Trinidad and Tobago
- Champions: Antigua and Barbuda Falcons (1st title)
- Runners-up: Jamaica Kingsmen
- Participants: 7
- Matches: 39
- Player of the series: Shadab Khan (Antigua and Barbuda Falcons)
- Most runs: Quinton de Kock (Barbados Tridents)(392)
- Most wickets: Imran Tahir (Guyana Amazon Warriors) (16)
- Official website: cplt20.com

The 2026 Caribbean Premier League (CPL2026) or for sponsorship reasons, Republic Bank CPL 2026, was the fourteenth season of the Caribbean Premier League, the domestic Twenty20 cricket league that was played in the West Indies. The tournament began on 7 August 2026 and the final was held on 20 September 2026 in Barbados. Trinbago Knight Riders were the defending champions.

In the final, Antigua & Barbuda Falcons defeated Jamaica Kingsmen by 8 wickets to win their first title.

== Background ==
In August 2025, it was reported that the tournament would feature an expanded roster of seven teams following the return of a Jamaica-based franchise. In February 2026, it was confirmed that the tournament would return to Jamaica, ending a seven-year absence of the league from the island. In March 2026, it was announced that the Jamaica Kingsmen will officially participate in the 2026 edition. In May 2026, it was also announced that the Barbados Tridents will return for the 2026 season as part of an ambitious "One Barbados" initiative.

=== Draft and Squad composition ===
Each team is allowed to build a squad of 17 players. The squad composition consists of nine West Indian players, five overseas players and three breakout players.

All the six teams part of 2025 season get four Right to Match Options (RMO) to protect players from previous season where three can be used on any salary slot and one can be used on salary slot 7 to 17 and should be player in the team's home territory. While Jamaica Kingsmen will get the first three picks in the draft where they can select only Jamaican players but can select only one player from existing teams and the other teams cannot use RMO. Kingsmen will get one RMO which can be exercised on Jamaican player and if player played in 2025 season, he should be in salary slot 7 to 17. Any team which loses player to Kingsmen will get an additional RMO.

The overseas players can be directly negotiated with a maximum of four players allowed in a match. One breakout player has to be included in every match.

=== Host nations ===
The 2026 season will be played across a record-equalling eight host nations. Matches are scheduled to take place in Antigua and Barbuda, Barbados, Guyana, Jamaica, Saint Kitts and Nevis, Saint Lucia, Saint Vincent and the Grenadines, and Trinidad and Tobago.

== Teams ==
Team	Captain	Head coach
Antigua & Barbuda Falcons	Moeen Ali	Paul Nixon
Barbados Tridents	Chris Green	Trevor Penney
Guyana Amazon Warriors	Imran Tahir	Lance Klusener
Jamaica Kingsmen	Rovman Powell	Grant Bradburn
St Kitts & Nevis Patriots	Jason Holder	Simon Helmot
Saint Lucia Kings	Roston Chase	Daren Sammy
Trinbago Knight Riders	Nicholas Pooran	Dwayne Bravo

== Venues ==
Venues of CPL 2026
Antigua and Barbuda	Barbados	Guyana	Jamaica
Sir Vivian Richards Stadium	Kensington Oval	Providence Stadium	Sabina Park
Capacity: 10,000	Capacity: 28,000	Capacity: 15,000	Capacity: 20,000
Saint Kitts and Nevis	Saint Lucia	Saint Vincent and the Grenadines	Trinidad and Tobago
Warner Park Sporting Complex	Daren Sammy Cricket Ground	Arnos Vale Stadium	Queen's Park Oval
Capacity: 8,000	Capacity: 12,400	Capacity: 18,000	Capacity: 15,000

== Squads ==
The following players were retained, signed or drafted by their respective teams.

Antigua & Barbuda Falcons	Barbados Tridents	Guyana Amazon Warriors	Jamaica Kingsmen	St Kitts & Nevis Patriots	Saint Lucia Kings	Trinbago Knight Riders
Moeen Ali (c); Alzarri Joseph; Amir Jangoo; Anderson Mahase; Anderson Phillip; Evin Lewis; Fabian Allen; Jahmar Hamilton; Jayden Seales; Joshua James; Karima Gore; Kusal Perera; Milind Kumar; Rahkeem Cornwall; Shadab Khan; Shamar Springer; Sufyan Moqim; Tajinder Singh; Tim Robinson	Chris Green (c); Brandon King; Daniel Sams; George Linde; Gudakesh Motie; Jakeem Pollard; Johann Layne; Kadeem Alleyne; Kofi James; Mujeeb Ur Rahman; Quinton de Kock; Ramon Simmonds; Rivaldo Clarke; Shadrack Descarte; Sherfane Rutherford; Zachary Carter; Zishan Motara	Imran Tahir (c); Dwaine Pretorius; Glenn Phillips; Isai Thorne; Jonathan van Lange; Khary Pierre; Matthew Nandu; Mavendra Dindiyal; Mohammad Haris; Mohammad Nabi; Quentin Sampson; Rahmanullah Gurbaz; Romario Shepherd; Ronaldo Alimohamed; Shai Hope; Shamar Joseph; Shimron Hetmyer; Veerasammy Permaul	Rovman Powell (c); Andre Russell; Hassan Khan; Hunain Shah; Jeavor Royal; Jediah Blades; Keacy Carty; Keemo Paul; Kelvin Pitman; Kirk McKenzie; Maaz Sadaqat; Odean Smith; Romaine Morris; Saim Ayub; Shaqkere Parris; Shayan Jahangir; Tayyab Arif; Usman Khan; Vitel Lawes	Jason Holder (c); Alick Athanaze; Andre Fletcher; Ashmead Nedd; Dasun Shanaka; Nikhil Chaudhary; Wanindu Hasaranga; Naseem Shah; Waqar Salamkheil; Jeremiah Louis; Johnson Charles; Kevin Wickham; Kyle Mayers; Micah McKenzie; Mikyle Louis; Navin Bidaisee; Obed McCoy	Roston Chase (c); Ackeem Auguste; Amari Goodridge; Charith Asalanka; Damion Joachim; Darron Nedd; Jewel Andrew; Johann Jeremiah; Joshua Bishop; Kamil Pooran; Keon Gaston; Maheesh Theekshana; Matthew Forde; McKenny Clarke; Noor Ahmad; Shadley van Schalkwyk; Tim Seifert	Nicholas Pooran (c); Akeal Hosein; Alex Hales; Amshi de Silva; Colin Munro; Matthew Breetzke; Dexter Sween; Dominic Drakes; Joshua Da Silva; Justin Greaves; Jyd Goolie; Kieron Pollard; Nathan Edward; Sunil Narine; Terrance Hinds; Usman Tariq; Abdul-Raheem Toppin

== Teams and standings ==
=== Points table ===
Pos	Team	Pld	W	L	NR	Pts	NRR	Qualification
1	Guyana Amazon Warriors	10	8	2	0	16	0.615	Advanced to Qualifier 1
2	Antigua & Barbuda Falcons	10	6	3	1	13	0.174	Advanced to Qualifier 1
3	Barbados Tridents	10	6	4	0	12	−0.125	Advanced to Eliminator
4	Jamaica Kingsmen	10	4	6	0	8	−0.085	Advanced to Eliminator
5	Saint Lucia Kings	10	4	6	0	8	−0.887	Eliminated
6	St Kitts & Nevis Patriots	10	3	6	1	7	0.252	Eliminated
7	Trinbago Knight Riders	10	3	7	0	6	−0.010	Eliminated

Source: Cricinfo

=== Match summary ===
Team	Group matches										Playoffs			
Team	1	2	3	4	5	6	7	8	9	10	E	Q1	Q2	F
Antigua & Barbuda Falcons	2	2	2	4	6	6	8	9	11	13		W		W
Barbados Tridents	2	4	4	4	4	4	6	8	10	12	L			
Guyana Amazon Warriors	2	4	6	8	10	12	12	14	16	16		L	L	
Jamaica Kingsmen	0	0	0	2	4	4	6	8	8	8	W		W	L
Saint Lucia Kings	2	2	4	4	4	6	8	8	8	8				
St Kitts & Nevis Patriots	0	2	2	2	2	3	5	7	7	7				
Trinbago Knight Riders	2	2	2	2	4	4	4	4	6	6				

Win	Loss	No result

- Note: The total points at the end of each group match are listed.
- Note: Click on the points (group matches) or W/L (playoffs) to see the match summary.

Visitor team →	ABF	BT	GAW	JK	SLK	SKNP	TKR
Home team ↓	ABF	BT	GAW	JK	SLK	SKNP	TKR
Antigua & Barbuda Falcons		Antigua; 30 runs	Guyana; 7 wickets		Saint Lucia; 4 runs	Antigua; 3 wickets	Antigua; 5 wickets
Barbados Tridents			Barbados; 6 wickets	Barbados; 2 wickets	Barbados; 8 wickets	Barbados; 4 wickets	Trinbago; 35 runs
Guyana Amazon Warriors	Antigua; 62 wickets			Guyana; 8 wickets	Guyana; 4 wickets	Guyana; 7 wickets	Guyana; 6 wickets
Jamaica Kingsmen	Antigua; 2 wickets	Barbados; 5 runs	Guyana; 6 wickets			Jamaica; 51 runs	Jamaica; 5 wickets
Saint Lucia Kings	Saint Lucia; 3 wickets (DLS)	Barbados; 9 runs	Guyana; 7 wickets	Saint Lucia; 6 wickets		St Kitts; 5 wickets	
St Kitts & Nevis Patriots	Match abandoned	St Kitts; 6 wickets		Jamaica; 12 runs	St Kitts; 137 runs		Trinbago; 19 runs (DLS)
Trinbago Knight Riders	Antigua; 8 runs	Trinbago; 7 wickets	Guyana; 9 runs (DLS)	Jamaica; 7 runs (DLS)	Saint Lucia; 36 runs		

Home team won	Visitor team won

- Note: Results listed are according to the home (horizontal) and visitor (vertical) teams.
- Note: Click on a result to see a summary of the match.

== League stage ==
On 28 April 2026, Cricket West Indies confirmed the full schedule for the tournament, which featured 39 matches to be played across eight venues.

=== Phase 1 (Saint Vincent) ===
Match 1
7 August 2026
19:00 (N)
Scorecard

Jamaica Kingsmen; 167/7 (20 overs)	v	Antigua & Barbuda Falcons; 168/8 (20 overs)
Rovman Powell 47 (37); Alzarri Joseph 3/34 (4 overs)		Tajinder Singh 62 (37); Keemo Paul 3/29 (4 overs)

Antigua & Barbuda Falcons won by 2 wickets
Arnos Vale Stadium, Saint Vincent
Umpires: Deighton Butler (WI) and Christopher Taylor (WI)
Player of the match: Alzarri Joseph (Antigua and Barbuda Falcons)

- Antigua and Barbuda Falcons won the toss and elected to field.
- This was the first CPL match played at this venue.

Match 2
8 August 2026
19:00 (N)
Scorecard

St Kitts & Nevis Patriots; 109/9 (20 overs)	v	Trinbago Knight Riders; 94/2 (15 overs)
Kevin Wickham 38 (44); Sunil Narine 3/7 (4)		Matthew Breetzke 35* (35); Jason Holder 1/13 (3 overs)

Trinbago Knight Riders won by 19 runs (DLS method)
Arnos Vale Stadium, Saint Vincent
Umpires: Ryan Banwarie (WI) and Leslie Reifer (WI)
Player of the match: Sunil Narine (Trinbago Knight Riders)

- Trinbago Knight Riders won the toss and elected to field.
- No further play was possible due to rain.
- Trinbago Knight Riders were 19 runs ahead of DLS par score of 76 runs from 15 overs.
- Dexter Sween (Trinbago Knight Riders) made his T20 debut.

Match 3
9 August 2026
19:00 (N)
Scorecard

Saint Lucia Kings; 187/8 (20 overs)	v	Antigua & Barbuda Falcons; 183/7 (20 overs)
Andries Gous 82 (51); Alzarri Joseph 3/32 (4 overs)		Evin Lewis 48 (24); Roston Chase 2/18 (4 overs); Maheesh Theekshana 2/18 (4 overs)

Saint Lucia Kings won by 4 runs
Arnos Vale Stadium, Saint Vincent
Umpires: Ryan Banwarie (WI) and Deighton Butler (WI)
Player of the match: Andries Gous (Saint Lucia Kings)

- Saint Lucia Kings won the toss and elected to bat.
- Darren Nedd and Kamil Pooran (Saint Lucia Kings) both made their T20 debuts.

=== Phase 2 (Antigua, Jamaica and Saint Lucia) ===
Match 4
11 August 2026
19:00 (N)
Scorecard

Barbados Tridents; 206/3 (20 overs)	v	Jamaica Kingsmen; 201/9 (20 overs)
Brandon King 73 (51); Hassan Khan 1/19 (3 overs)		Andre Russell 68 (38); Daniel Sams 4/20 (4 overs)

Barbados Tridents won by 5 runs
Sabina Park, Jamaica
Umpires: Gregory Brathwaite (WI) and Chris Wright (WI)
Player of the match: Daniel Sams (Barbados Tridents)

- Jamaica Kingsmen won the toss and elected to field.

Match 5
12 August 2026
19:00 (N)
Scorecard

Saint Lucia Kings; 155/8 (20 overs)	v	St Kitts & Nevis Patriots; 156/5 (17.4 overs)
Jewel Andrew 58 (42); Jason Holder 3/20 (4 overs)		Andre Fletcher 48* (41); Maheesh Theekshana 2/22 (4 overs)

St Kitts & Nevis Patriots won by 5 wickets
Daren Sammy Cricket Ground, Saint Lucia
Umpires: Leslie Reifer (WI) and Christopher Taylor (WI)
Player of the match: Andre Fletcher (St Kitts & Nevis Patriots)

- Saint Lucia Kings won the toss and elected to bat.
- Andre Fletcher (St Kitts & Nevis Patriots) scored his 9,000th runs in T20s.

Match 6
13 August 2026
19:00 (N)
Scorecard

Jamaica Kingsmen; 117 (19.4 overs)	v	Guyana Amazon Warriors; 118/4 (14.1 overs)
Reeza Hendricks 40 (32); Mohammad Nabi 4/22 (4 overs)		Shai Hope 56* (41); Andre Russell 2/12 (2 overs)

Guyana Amazon Warriors won by 6 wickets
Sabina Park, Jamaica
Umpires: Zahid Bassarath (WI) and Carl Tuckett (WI)
Player of the match: Mohammad Nabi (Guyana Amazon Warriors)

- Guyana Amazon Warriors won the toss and elected to field.
- Mavendra Dindyal (Guyana Amazon Warriors) made his T20 debut.

Match 7
14 August 2026
19:00 (N)
Scorecard

Antigua & Barbuda Falcons; 98/9 (19 overs)	v	Saint Lucia Kings; 54/7 (7.4 overs)
Rahkeem Cornwall 26 (17); Matthew Forde 4/29 (4 overs)		Joshua Bishop 12* (10); Shamar Springer 3/13 (2 overs)

Saint Lucia Kings won by 3 wickets (DLS method)
Daren Sammy Cricket Ground, Saint Lucia
Umpires: Deighton Butler (WI) and Christopher Taylor (WI)
Player of the match: Matthew Forde (Saint Lucia Kings)

- Saint Lucia Kings won the toss and elected to field.
- The match was reduced to 19 overs per side due to rain.
- Saint Lucia Kings were set a revised target of 52 runs off 8 overs due to rain.

Match 8
15 August 2026
19:00 (N)
Scorecard

Trinbago Knight Riders; 182/6 (20 overs)	v	Jamaica Kingsmen; 183/5 (18.4 overs)
Kieron Pollard 44 (22); Hunain Shah 2/31 (4 overs)		Kirk McKenzie 69 (25); Usman Tariq 3/21 (4 overs)

Jamaica Kingsmen won by 5 wickets
Sabina Park, Jamaica
Umpires: Zahid Bassarath (WI) and Chris Wright (WI)
Player of the match: Kirk McKenzie (Jamaica Kingsmen)

- Jamaica Kingsmen won the toss and elected to field.

Match 9
16 August 2026
19:00 (N)
Scorecard

Barbados Tridents; 177/5 (18 overs)	v	Saint Lucia Kings; 168/7 (18 overs)
Sherfane Rutherford 61 (31); Shadley van Schalkwyk 2/25 (3 overs)		Ackeem Auguste 63 (34); Gudakesh Motie 3/22 (4 overs)

Barbados Tridents won by 9 runs
Daren Sammy Cricket Ground, Saint Lucia
Umpires: Ryan Banwarie (WI) and Leslie Reifer (WI)
Player of the match: Sherfane Rutherford (Barbados Tridents)

- Saint Lucia Kings won the toss and elected to field.
- The match was reduced to 18 overs per side due to rain.
- Amari Goodridge (Saint Lucia Kings) made his T20 debut.

Match 10
18 August 2026
19:00 (N)
Scorecard

Jamaica Kingsmen; 181/6 (20 overs)	v	St Kitts & Nevis Patriots; 130 (18 overs)
Keemo Paul 65 (36); Wanindu Hasaranga 2/36 (4 overs)		Kevin Wickham 37 (34); Keemo Paul 3/30 (4 overs)

Jamaica Kingsmen won by 51 runs
Sabina Park, Jamaica
Umpires: Gregory Brathwaite (WI) and Carl Tuckett (WI)
Player of the match: Keemo Paul (Jamaica Kingsmen)

- St Kitts & Nevis Patriots won the toss and elected to field.

Match 11
19 August 2026
19:00 (N)
Scorecard

Saint Lucia Kings; 151/7 (20 overs)	v	Guyana Amazon Warriors; 157/3 (18.1 overs)
Charith Asalanka 35 (28); Dwaine Pretorius 3/29 (4 overs)		Mavendra Dindyal 50 (51); Maheesh Theekshana 2/33 (3.1 overs)

Guyana Amazon Warriors won by 7 wickets
Daren Sammy Cricket Ground, Saint Lucia
Umpires: Ryan Banwarie (WI) and Deighton Butler (WI)
Player of the match: Dwaine Pretorius (Guyana Amazon Warriors)

- Guyana Amazon Warriors won the toss and elected to field.

Match 12
20 August 2026
19:00 (N)
Scorecard

St Kitts & Nevis Patriots; 187/6 (20 overs)	v	Antigua & Barbuda Falcons; 191/7 (19.3 overs)
Dasun Shanaka 49* (17); Shamar Springer 2/42 (4 overs)		Evin Lewis 48 (38); Jason Holder 2/39 (4 overs)

Antigua & Barbuda Falcons won by 3 wickets
Sir Vivian Richards Stadium, Antigua
Umpires: Gregory Brathwaite (WI) and Chris Wright (WI)
Player of the match: Shadab Khan (Antigua & Barbuda Falcons)

- Antigua & Barbuda Falcons won the toss and elected to field.

Match 13
21 August 2026
19:00 (N)
Scorecard

Jamaica Kingsmen; 169/9 (20 overs)	v	Saint Lucia Kings; 171/4 (18.2 overs)
Keacy Carty 50 (45); Matthew Forde 5/23 (4)		Kamil Pooran 81* (49); Vitel Lawes 2/22 (3)

Saint Lucia Kings won by 6 wickets
Daren Sammy Cricket Ground, Saint Lucia
Umpires: Leslie Reifer (WI) and Christopher Taylor (WI)
Player of the match: Matthew Forde (Saint Lucia Kings)

- Saint Lucia Kings won the toss and elected to field.
- Matthew Forde (Saint Lucia Kings) took his maiden five-wicket haul in T20s.
- Usman Khan (Jamaica Kingsmen) scored his 3,000th runs in T20s.

Match 14
22 August 2026
19:00 (N)
Scorecard

Trinbago Knight Riders; 165/6 (20 overs)	v	Antigua & Barbuda Falcons; 168/5 (18.3 overs)
Colin Munro 46 (33); Rahkeem Cornwall 2/17 (2 overs)		Shadab Khan 52* (20); Terrance Hinds 2/36 (2.3 overs)

Antigua & Barbuda Falcons won by 5 wickets
Sir Vivian Richards Stadium, Antigua
Umpires: Zahid Bassarath (WI) and Carl Tuckett (WI)
Player of the match: Shadab Khan (Antigua & Barbuda Falcons)

- Antigua & Barbuda Falcons won the toss and elected to field.

Match 15
23 August 2026
19:00 (N)
Scorecard

Antigua & Barbuda Falcons; 116 (17 overs)	v	Guyana Amazon Warriors; 121/3 (9.5 overs)
Amir Jangoo 37 (29); Shamar Joseph 3/22 (3 overs)		Shimron Hetmyer 49 (19); Jayden Seales 1/21 (3 overs)

Guyana Amazon Warriors won by 7 wickets
Sir Vivian Richards Stadium, Antigua
Umpires: Zahid Bassarath (WI) and Chris Wright (WI)
Player of the match: Khary Pierre (Guyana Amazon Warriors)

- Guyana Amazon Warriors won the toss and elected to field.

Match 16
25 August 2026
19:00 (N)
Scorecard

Antigua & Barbuda Falcons; 155/5 (20 overs)	v	Barbados Tridents; 125 (18 overs)
Moeen Ali 56 (37); Mujeeb Ur Rahman 2/32 (4 overs)		Rivaldo Clarke 27 (26); Joshua James 3/18 (3 overs)

Antigua & Barbuda Falcons won by 30 runs
Sir Vivian Richards Stadium, Antigua
Umpires: Gregory Brathwaite (WI) and Carl Tuckett (WI)
Player of the match: Joshua James (Antigua & Barbuda Falcons)

- Barbados Tridents won the toss and elected to field.
- Shian Brathwaite (Barbados Tridents) made his T20 debut.
- Sufyan Moqim (Antigua & Barbuda Falcons) took his 100th wicket in T20s.

=== Phase 3 (Trinidad and Saint Kitts) ===
Match 17
26 August 2026
19:00 (N)
Scorecard

Saint Lucia Kings; 211/4 (20 overs)	v	Trinbago Knight Riders; 175/6 (20 overs)
Tim Seifert 105* (61); Kieron Pollard 1/24 (3 overs)		Kieron Pollard 65 (26); Roston Chase 3/24 (4 overs)

Saint Lucia Kings won by 36 runs
Queen's Park Oval, Trinidad
Umpires: Deighton Butler (WI) and Christopher Taylor (WI)
Player of the match: Tim Seifert (Saint Lucia Kings)

- Trinbago Knight Riders won the toss and elected to field.
- Abdul-Raheem Toppin (Trinbago Knight Riders) made his T20 debut.

Match 18
27 August 2026
19:00 (N)
Scorecard

Jamaica Kingsmen; 182/7 (20 overs)	v	St Kitts & Nevis Patriots; 171/6 (20 overs)
Saim Ayub 102 (58); Wanindu Hasaranga 2/18 (4 overs)		Andre Fletcher 55 (38); Hunain Shah 2/23 (4 overs)

Jamaica Kingsmen won by 11 runs
Warner Park Sporting Complex, Saint Kitts
Umpires: Gregory Brathwaite (WI) and Chris Wright (WI)
Player of the match: Saim Ayub (Jamaica Kingsmen)

- St Kitts & Nevis Patriots won the toss and elected to field.

Match 19
28 August 2026
20:00 (N)
Scorecard

Barbados Tridents; 127/9 (20 overs)	v	Trinbago Knight Riders; 128/3 (14.5 overs)
Zachary Carter 28 (27); Sunil Narine 2/14 (4 overs)		Sunil Narine 55 (33); Ramon Simmonds 1/20 (2.5 overs)

Trinbago Knight Riders won by 7 wickets
Queen's Park Oval, Trinidad
Umpires: Ryan Banwarie (WI) and Leslie Reifer (WI)
Player of the match: Sunil Narine (Trinbago Knight Riders)

- Trinbago Knight Riders won the toss and elected to field.

Match 20
29 August 2026
19:00 (N)
Scorecard

Trinbago Knight Riders; 180/6 (20 overs)	v	Jamaica Kingsmen; 127/3 (14.4 overs)
Nicholas Pooran 60* (37); Vitel Lawes 3/29 (4 overs)		Keacy Carty 42 (33); Jyd Goolie 2/30 (4 overs)

Jamaica Kingsmen won by 7 runs (DLS method)
Queen's Park Oval, Trinidad
Umpires: Ryan Banwarie (WI) and Deighton Butler (WI)
Player of the match: Vitel Lawes (Jamaica Kingsmen)

- Jamaica Kingsmen won the toss and elected to field.
- Jamaica Kingsmen were 7 runs ahead of DLS par score of 120 runs from 14.4 overs.
- Rain prevented any further play.

Match 21
30 August 2026
19:00 (N)
Scorecard

St Kitts & Nevis Patriots	v	Antigua & Barbuda Falcons

No result
Warner Park Sporting Complex, Saint Kitts
Umpires: Zahid Bassarath (WI) and Carl Tuckett (WI)

- Antigua & Barbuda Falcons won the toss and elected to field.
- No play was possible due to rain.

Match 22
31 August 2026
17:00 (D/N)
Scorecard

Guyana Amazon Warriors; 185/5 (16 overs)	v	Trinbago Knight Riders; 172/7 (16 overs)
Shimron Hetmyer 111* (43); Akeal Hosein 1/11 (2 overs)		Alex Hales 55 (24); Mohammad Nabi 3/20 (3 overs)

Guyana Amazon Warriors won by 9 runs (DLS method)
Queen's Park Oval, Trinidad
Umpires: Leslie Reifer (WI) and Christopher Taylor (WI)
Player of the match: Shimron Hetmyer (Guyana Amazon Warriors)

- Trinbago Knight Riders won the toss and elected to field.
- The match was reduced to 16 overs per side due to rain.
- Trinbago Knight Riders were set a revised target of 182 runs off 16 overs due to rain.
- Shimron Hetmyer (Guyana Amazon Warriors) scored his 7,000th runs in T20s.

Match 23
1 September 2026
19:00 (N)
Scorecard

Barbados Tridents; 217/4 (20 overs)	v	St Kitts & Nevis Patriots; 220/4 (19.1 overs)
Quinton de Kock 106 (57); Naseem Shah 2/43 (4 overs)		Johnson Charles 78 (45); Daniel Sams 2/40 (4 overs)

St Kitts & Nevis Patriots won by 6 wickets
Warner Park Sporting Complex, Saint Kitts
Umpires: Zahid Bassarath (WI) and Chris Wright (WI)
Player of the match: Johnson Charles (St Kitts & Nevis Patriots)

- St Kitts & Nevis Patriots won the toss and elected to field.

Match 24
2 September 2026
19:00 (N)
Scorecard

Antigua & Barbuda Falcons; 183/4 (20 overs)	v	Trinbago Knight Riders; 175/7 (20 overs)
Hassan Nawaz 76 (48); Usman Tariq 1/25 (4 overs)		Joshua Da Silva 54* (31); Rahkeem Cornwall 3/17 (3 overs)

Antigua & Barbuda Falcons won by 8 runs
Queen's Park Oval, Trinidad
Umpires: Deighton Butler (WI) and Christopher Taylor (WI)
Player of the match: Rahkeem Cornwall (Antigua & Barbuda Falcons)

- Trinbago Knight Riders won the toss and elected to field.

Match 25
3 September 2026
19:00 (N)
Scorecard

St Kitts & Nevis Patriots; 235/4 (20 overs)	v	Saint Lucia Kings; 98 (13.5 overs)
Dasun Shanaka 121* (43); Matthew Forde 2/48 (4 overs)		Tim Seifert 50 (36); Jeremiah Louis 5/10 (2.5 overs)

St Kitts & Nevis Patriots won by 137 runs
Warner Park Sporting Complex, Saint Kitts
Umpires: Gregory Brathwaite (WI) and Carl Tuckett (WI)
Player of the match: Dasun Shanaka (St Kitts & Nevis Patriots)

- Saint Lucia Kings won the toss and elected to field.
- Dasun Shanaka (St Kitts & Nevis Patriots) scored the fastest century (off 39 balls) in CPL.
- Jeremiah Louis (St Kitts & Nevis Patriots) took his maiden five-wicket haul in T20s.

=== Phase 4 (Guyana and Barbados) ===
Match 26
4 September 2026
19:00 (N)
Scorecard

Jamaica Kingsmen; 159/7 (20 overs)	v	Guyana Amazon Warriors; 160/2 (17.2 overs)
Hassan Khan 62* (29); Dwaine Pretorius 2/20 (3 overs)		Rahmanullah Gurbaz 54 (35); Maaz Sadaqat 1/6 (1 over)

Guyana Amazon Warriors won by 8 wickets
Providence Stadium, Guyana
Umpires: Ryan Banwarie (WI) and Leslie Reifer (WI)
Player of the match: Dwaine Pretorius (Guyana Amazon Warriors)

- Guyana Amazon Warriors won the toss and elected to field.
- Mohammad Nabi (Guyana Amazon Warriors) played in his 500th match in T20s.
- Rahmanullah Gurbaz (Guyana Amazon Warriors) scored his 7,000th runs in T20s.

Match 27
5 September 2026
20:00 (N)
Scorecard

Trinbago Knight Riders; 147/6 (20 overs)	v	Barbados Tridents; 112 (18.3 overs)
Nicholas Pooran 59 (37); Gudakesh Motie 3/29 (2 overs)		Zachary Carter 21 (20); Sunil Narine 4/12 (3.3 overs)

Trinbago Knight Riders won by 35 runs
Kensington Oval, Barbados
Umpires: Zahid Bassarath (WI) and Chris Wright (WI)
Player of the match: Sunil Narine (Trinbago Knight Riders)

- Barbados Tridents won the toss and elected to field.
- Jakeem Pollard (Barbados Tridents) made his T20 debut.

Match 28
6 September 2026
15:00
Scorecard

St Kitts & Nevis Patriots; 128 (19.2 overs)	v	Guyana Amazon Warriors; 132/3 (18.3 overs)
Alick Athanaze 52 (39); Mohammad Nabi 4/17 (4 overs)		Rahmanullah Gurbaz 39 (25); Navin Bidaisee 2/20 (4 overs)

Guyana Amazon Warriors won by 7 wickets
Providence Stadium, Guyana
Umpires: Ryan Banwarie (WI) and Deighton Butler (WI)
Player of the match: Mohammad Nabi (Guyana Amazon Warriors)

- St Kitts & Nevis Patriots won the toss and elected to bat.

Match 29
6 September 2026
19:00 (N)
Scorecard

Saint Lucia Kings; 138/6 (20 overs)	v	Barbados Tridents; 139/2 (17.5 overs)
Kamil Pooran 37 (24); Mujeeb Ur Rahman 3/22 (4 overs)		Quinton de Kock 47* (31); Joshua Bishop 1/24 (3 overs)

Barbados Tridents won by 8 wickets
Kensington Oval, Barbados
Umpires: Gregory Brathwaite (WI) and Carl Tuckett (WI)
Player of the match: Mujeeb Ur Rahman (Barbados Tridents)

- Barbados Tridents won the toss and elected to field.

Match 30
8 September 2026
19:00 (N)
Scorecard

Antigua & Barbuda Falcons; 182/5 (20 overs)	v	Guyana Amazon Warriors; 117 (14.2 overs)
Hassan Nawaz 36 (27); Imran Tahir 1/21 (4 overs)		Mavendra Dindyal 25 (13); Alzarri Joseph 4/41 (4 overs)

Antigua & Barbuda Falcons won by 65 runs
Providence Stadium, Guyana
Umpires: Leslie Reifer (WI) and Christopher Taylor (WI)
Player of the match: Shadab Khan (Antigua & Barbuda Falcons)

- Guyana Amazon Warriors won the toss and elected to field.

Match 31
9 September 2026
19:00 (N)
Scorecard

Saint Lucia Kings; 119 (18.5 overs)	v	Guyana Amazon Warriors; 122/6 (18.3 overs)
Kamil Pooran 43 (35); Imran Tahir 5/17 (4 overs)		Quentin Sampson 37* (11); Roston Chase 3/34 (4 overs)

Guyana Amazon Warriors won by 4 wickets
Providence Stadium, Guyana
Umpires: Deighton Butler (WI) and Christopher Taylor (WI)
Player of the match: Imran Tahir (Guyana Amazon Warriors)

- Saint Lucia Kings won the toss and elected to bat.
- Kemol Savory (Saint Lucia Kings) made his T20 debut.

Match 32
10 September 2026
19:00 (N)
Scorecard

St Kitts & Nevis Patriots; 118 (20 overs)	v	Barbados Tridents; 120/6 (18 overs)
Wanindu Hasaranga 45 (25); Chris Green 4/20 (4 overs)		Quinton de Kock 44* (43); Jason Holder 3/31 (4 overs)

Barbados Tridents won by 4 wickets
Kensington Oval, Barbados
Umpires: Zahid Bassarath (WI) and Chris Wright (WI)
Player of the match: Chris Green (Barbados Tridents)

- Barbados Tridents won the toss and elected to field.

Match 33
11 September 2026
19:00 (N)
Scorecard

Trinbago Knight Riders; 126/8 (20 overs)	v	Guyana Amazon Warriors; 127/4 (18.4 overs)
Justin Greaves 35 (37); Mehidy Hasan Miraz 4/23 (4 overs)		Shai Hope 42* (35); Sunil Narine 1/13 (4 overs)

Guyana Amazon Warriors won by 6 wickets
Providence Stadium, Guyana
Umpires: Ryan Banwarie (WI) and Leslie Reifer (WI)
Player of the match: Mehidy Hasan Miraz (Guyana Amazon Warriors)

- Guyana Amazon Warriors won the toss and elected to field.
- Sunil Narine (Trinbago Knight Riders) scored his 5,000th runs in T20s.
- Shai Hope (Guyana Amazon Warriors) scored his 6,000th runs in T20s.
- This was the 100th win for the Guyana Amazon Warriors in CPL.

Match 34
12 September 2026
20:00 (N)
Scorecard

Jamaica Kingsmen; 150/9 (20 overs)	v	Barbados Tridents; 151/8 (20 overs)
Maaz Sadaqat 47 (34); Jakeem Pollard 3/38 (4 overs)		Shadrack Descarte 56 (42); Hunain Shah 2/25 (4 overs)

Barbados Tridents won by 2 wickets
Kensington Oval, Barbados
Umpires: Gregory Brathwaite (WI) and Carl Tuckett (WI)
Player of the match: Gudakesh Motie (Barbados Tridents)

- Barbados Tridents won the toss and elected to field.

Match 35
13 September 2026
19:00 (N)
Scorecard

Guyana Amazon Warriors; 99 (18.1 overs)	v	Barbados Tridents; 100/4 (14.5 overs)
Glenn Phillips 24 (23); Johann Layne 3/14 (2 overs)		Brandon King 44* (42); Mehidy Hasan Miraz 2/25 (4 overs)

Barbados Tridents won by 6 wickets
Kensington Oval, Barbados
Umpires: Zahid Bassarath (WI) and Chris Wright (WI)
Player of the match: Allah Ghazanfar (Barbados Tridents)

- Barbados Tridents won the toss and elected to field.
- Ronaldo Alimohamed (Guyana Amazon Warriors) made his T20 debut.
- Allah Ghazanfar (Barbados Tridents) took his 100th wicket in T20s.

== Playoffs ==
=== Bracket ===
Qualifier 1
17 September 2026 — Barbados
1	Guyana Amazon Warriors	76 (15 overs)
2	Antigua & Barbuda Falcons	77/1 (5.2 overs)
Eliminator
16 September 2026 — Barbados
3	Barbados Tridents	144/6 (20 overs)
4	Jamaica Kingsmen	145/1 (14.1 overs)

Qualifier 2
18 September 2026 — Barbados
Q1L	Guyana Amazon Warriors	206/4 (20 overs)
EW	Jamaica Kingsmen	207/5 (19.4 overs)

Final
20 September 2026 — Barbados
Q1W	Antigua & Barbuda Falcons	173/2 (16.4 overs)
Q2W	Jamaica Kingsmen	170/9 (20 overs)

- Source: Cricinfo

=== Eliminator ===
Eliminator
16 September 2026
19:00 (N)
Scorecard

Barbados Tridents; 144/6 (20 overs)	v	Jamaica Kingsmen; 145/1 (14.1 overs)
Quinton de Kock 71 (49); Andre Russell 2/36 (3.5 overs)		Maaz Sadaqat 112 (49); Daniel Sams 1/26 (3 overs)

Jamaica Kingsmen won by 9 wickets
Kensington Oval, Barbados
Umpires: Zahid Bassarath (WI) and Christopher Taylor (WI)
Player of the match: Maaz Sadaqat (Jamaica Kingsmen)

- Jamaica Kingsmen won the toss and elected to field.
- Romaine Morris (Jamaica Kingsmen) made his T20 debut.
- Quinton de Kock (Barbados Tridents) scored his 13,000th runs in T20s.

=== Qualifier 1 ===
Qualifier 1
17 September 2026
20:00 (N)
Scorecard

Guyana Amazon Warriors; 76 (15 overs)	v	Antigua & Barbuda Falcons; 77/1 (5.2 overs)
Glenn Phillips 16 (15); Shai Hope 16 (15); Sufyan Moqim 4/13 (4 overs)		Rahkeem Cornwall 49 (16); Imran Tahir 1/20 (2 overs)

Antigua & Barbuda Falcons won by 9 wickets
Kensington Oval, Barbados
Umpires: Gregory Brathwaite (WI) and Leslie Reifer (WI)
Player of the match: Shadab Khan (Antigua & Barbuda Falcons)

- Antigua & Barbuda Falcons won the toss and elected to field.
- Shadab Khan (Antigua & Barbuda Falcons) took his maiden hat-trick in CPL.

=== Qualifier 2 ===
Qualifier 2
18 September 2026
19:00 (N)
Scorecard

Guyana Amazon Warriors; 206/4 (20 overs)	v	Jamaica Kingsmen; 207/5 (19.4 overs)
Shimron Hetmyer 102* (45); Hassan Khan 1/25 (4 overs)		Keacy Carty 56 (40); Dwaine Pretorius 2/37 (4 overs)

Jamaica Kingsmen won by 5 wickets
Kensington Oval, Barbados
Umpires: Zahid Bassarath (WI) and Deighton Butler (WI)
Player of the match: Rovman Powell (Jamaica Kingsmen)

- Jamaica Kingsmen won the toss and elected to field.

=== Final ===
Final
20 September 2026
19:00 (N)
Scorecard

Jamaica Kingsmen; 170/9 (20 overs)	v	Antigua & Barbuda Falcons; 173/2 (16.4 overs)
Maaz Sadaqat 114 (58); Sufyan Moqim 4/14 (4 overs)		Amir Jangoo 57* (34); Vitel Lawes 1/32 (4 overs)

Antigua & Barbuda Falcons won by 8 wickets
Kensington Oval, Barbados
Umpires: Zahid Bassarath (WI) and Deighton Butler (WI)
Player of the match: Sufyan Moqim (Antigua & Barbuda Falcons)

- Antigua & Barbuda Falcons won the toss and elected to field.
- Antigua & Barbuda Falcons won their maiden CPL title.

== Statistics ==
=== Most runs ===
Runs	Player	Team	Inns.	SR	HS	Avg.	50/100	4's	6's
321	Quinton de Kock	Barbados Tridents	10	142.66	106	40.12	0/1	24	18
320	Colin Munro	Trinbago Knight Riders	10	125.98	52	32.00	1/0	32	16
283	Nicholas Pooran	Trinbago Knight Riders	9	174.69	60*	35.37	2/0	20	23
281	Dasun Shanaka	St Kitts & Nevis Patriots	8	193.79	121*	56.20	0/1	18	24
276	Shai Hope	Guyana Amazon Warriors	10	112.65	56*	55.20	1/0	11	13
Source: Cricinfo Updated: 14 September 2026

=== Most wickets ===
Wickets	Player	Team	Inns.	Econ.	BBI
16	Matthew Forde	Saint Lucia Kings	10	9.13	5/23
15	Roston Chase	Saint Lucia Kings	10	6.69	3/24
14	Imran Tahir	Guyana Amazon Warriors	10	6.73	5/17
14	Daniel Sams	Barbados Tridents	9	7.48	4/20
14	Hunain Shah	Jamaica Kingsmen	10	7.72	2/23
14	Alzarri Joseph	Antigua and Barbuda Falcons	8	9.23	4/41
Source: Cricinfo Updated: 14 September 2026

== Awards ==
On September 20, 2026, a list of end of season awards was announced.

Awards in the 2026 Caribbean Premier League
Name	Team	Award
Quinton de Kock	Barbados Tridents	Highest Run Scorer Award
Dasun Shanaka	St Kitts & Nevis Patriots	Highest Individual Score
Navin Bidaisee		Best Catch of the Tournament
Rovman Powell	Jamaica Kingsmen	Biggest Six of the Tournament (101 meters)
Jeremiah Louis		Best Celebration Award

== Broadcasting ==
The following broadcasters hold the media rights for the CPL 2026.

Territory	Television Rights	Digital / Streaming Rights
Australia	Fox Sports	YouTube
Bangladesh	—N/a	TapMad & YouTube
Europe	—N/a	Cricbuzz
Guyana	E-Networks	—N/a
India	JioStar	—N/a
Indian Sub-Continent	—N/a	YouTube & FanCode
Middle East and North Africa	—N/a	Cricbuzz
New Zealand	Sky Sport (New Zealand)	YouTube
North America	Willow	Willow
Pakistan	—N/a	TapMad & YouTube
Pan-Caribbean	Rush Live & Louder	—N/a
Saint Lucia	Winners TV	—N/a
South East Asia	—N/a	Cricbuzz
Trinidad & Tobago	CNC3	—N/a
United Kingdom	TNT Sports	—N/a
Rest of the World	—N/a	YouTube
