= 2026 Antigua & Barbuda Falcons season =

Twenty20 cricket Caribbean Premier League season

Antigua & Barbuda Falcons
2026 season
- Coach: Paul Nixon
- Captain(s): Moeen Ali
- Overseas player: Moeen Ali; Kusal Perera; Milind Kumar; Tajinder Singh; Shadab Khan; Sufiyan Muqeem
- Home ground: Sir Vivian Richards Stadium
- League: Caribbean Premier League
- League Stage: 2nd
- CPL finals: Champions
- Leading Run Scorer: –
- Leading Wicket Taker: –

The 2026 Antigua & Barbuda Falcons season is the third season of the franchise in the Caribbean Premier League. The team is captained by Moeen Ali and coached by Paul Nixon.

In the final, Antigua & Barbuda Falcons defeated Jamaica Kingsmen by 8 wickets to win their first title.

== Current squads ==
The following players were retained, signed or drafted by their respective teams.

No.	Name	Nationality	Birth date	Batting style	Bowling style	Year signed	Notes
Batsmen
—N/a	Evin Lewis	West Indies	27 December 1991 (age 34)	Left-handed		2026	
—N/a	Milind Kumar	United States	15 February 1990 (age 36)	Right-handed	Right-arm off-break	2026	Overseas
—N/a	Anderson Mahase	West Indies		Left-handed		2026	
—N/a	Tajinder Singh	United States		Right-handed	Right-arm medium	2026	Overseas
All-rounders
—N/a	Moeen Ali	England	18 June 1987 (age 39)	Left-handed	Right-arm off-break	2026	Captain, Overseas
—N/a	Shadab Khan	Pakistan	4 October 1998 (age 27)	Right-handed	Right-arm legbreak	2026	Overseas
—N/a	Fabian Allen	West Indies	7 May 1995 (age 31)	Left-handed	Slow left-arm orthodox	2026	
—N/a	Rahkeem Cornwall	West Indies	1 February 1993 (age 33)	Right-handed	Right-arm off-break	2026	
—N/a	Shamar Springer	West Indies		Right-handed	Right-arm medium-fast	2026	
—N/a	Joshua James	West Indies		Right-handed	Right-arm medium-fast	2026	
—N/a	Karima Gore	West Indies		Right-handed	Slow left-arm orthodox	2026	
Wicket-keepers
—N/a	Amir Jangoo	West Indies	4 July 1997 (age 29)	Left-handed		2026	
—N/a	Jahmar Hamilton	West Indies	27 April 1990 (age 36)	Right-handed		2026	
—N/a	Kusal Perera	Sri Lanka	20 August 1990 (age 36)	Left-handed		2026	Overseas
Spin bowlers
—N/a	Sufyan Moqim	Pakistan	25 April 1999 (age 27)	Left-handed	Slow left-arm orthodox	2026	Overseas
Pace bowlers
—N/a	Alzarri Joseph	West Indies	20 November 1996 (age 29)	Right-handed	Right-arm fast	2026	
—N/a	Jayden Seales	West Indies	10 September 2001 (age 25)	Right-handed	Right-arm medium-fast	2026	
—N/a	Anderson Phillip	West Indies	14 June 1996 (age 30)	Right-handed	Right-arm fast-medium	2026	

== Standings ==
=== Points table ===
Pos	Team	Pld	W	L	NR	Pts	NRR	Qualification
1	Guyana Amazon Warriors (3rd)	10	8	2	0	16	0.615	Advanced to Qualifier 1
2	Antigua & Barbuda Falcons (C)	10	6	3	1	13	0.174	Advanced to Qualifier 1
3	Barbados Tridents (4th)	10	6	4	0	12	−0.125	Advanced to Eliminator
4	Jamaica Kingsmen (R)	10	4	6	0	8	−0.085	Advanced to Eliminator
5	Saint Lucia Kings	10	4	6	0	8	−0.887	Eliminated
6	St Kitts & Nevis Patriots	10	3	6	1	7	0.252	Eliminated
7	Trinbago Knight Riders	10	3	7	0	6	−0.010	Eliminated

Source: Cricinfo
(C) Champions; (R) Runners-up

=== Match summary ===
Team	League stage										Knockout stage		
Team	1	2	3	4	5	6	7	8	9	10	Q/E	C	F
Antigua & Barbuda Falcons	2	2	2	4	6	6	8	9	11	13	W		W

Win	Loss	Tie	No Result

== Fixtures ==
On 28 April 2026, Cricket West Indies confirmed the full schedule for the tournament, which featured 10 matches for Antigua & Barbuda Falcons to be played across six venues.

=== Phase 1 (Saint Vincent) ===
Match 1
7 August 2026
19:00 (N)
Scorecard

Jamaica Kingsmen; 167/7 (20 overs)	v	Antigua & Barbuda Falcons; 168/8 (20 overs)
Rovman Powell 47 (37); Alzarri Joseph 3/34 (4 overs)		Tajinder Singh 62 (37); Keemo Paul 3/29 (4 overs)

Antigua & Barbuda Falcons won by 2 wickets
Arnos Vale Stadium, Saint Vincent
Umpires: Deighton Butler (WI) and Christopher Taylor (WI)
Player of the match: Alzarri Joseph (Antigua and Barbuda Falcons)

- Antigua and Barbuda Falcons won the toss and elected to field.
- This was the first CPL match played at this venue.

Match 3
9 August 2026
19:00 (N)
Scorecard

Saint Lucia Kings; 187/8 (20 overs)	v	Antigua & Barbuda Falcons; 183/7 (20 overs)
Andries Gous 82 (51); Alzarri Joseph 3/32 (4 overs)		Evin Lewis 48 (24); Roston Chase 2/18 (4 overs); Maheesh Theekshana 2/18 (4 overs)

Saint Lucia Kings won by 4 runs
Arnos Vale Stadium, Saint Vincent
Umpires: Ryan Banwarie (WI) and Deighton Butler (WI)
Player of the match: Andries Gous (Saint Lucia Kings)

- Saint Lucia Kings won the toss and elected to bat.
- Darren Nedd and Kamil Pooran (Saint Lucia Kings) both made their T20 debuts.

=== Phase 2 (Antigua, Jamaica and Saint Lucia) ===
Match 7
14 August 2026
19:00 (N)
Scorecard

Antigua & Barbuda Falcons; 98/9 (19 overs)	v	Saint Lucia Kings; 54/7 (7.4 overs)
Rahkeem Cornwall 26 (17); Matthew Forde 4/29 (4 overs)		Joshua Bishop 12* (10); Shamar Springer 3/13 (2 overs)

Saint Lucia Kings won by 3 wickets (DLS method)
Daren Sammy Cricket Ground, Saint Lucia
Umpires: Deighton Butler (WI) and Christopher Taylor (WI)
Player of the match: Matthew Forde (Saint Lucia Kings)

- Saint Lucia Kings won the toss and elected to field.
- The match was reduced to 19 overs per side due to rain.
- Saint Lucia Kings were set a revised target of 52 runs off 8 overs due to rain.

Match 12
20 August 2026
19:00 (N)
Scorecard

St Kitts & Nevis Patriots; 187/6 (20 overs)	v	Antigua & Barbuda Falcons; 191/7 (19.3 overs)
Dasun Shanaka 49* (17); Shamar Springer 2/42 (4 overs)		Evin Lewis 48 (38); Jason Holder 2/39 (4 overs)

Antigua & Barbuda Falcons won by 3 wickets
Sir Vivian Richards Stadium, Antigua
Umpires: Gregory Brathwaite (WI) and Chris Wright (WI)
Player of the match: Shadab Khan (Antigua & Barbuda Falcons)

- Antigua & Barbuda Falcons won the toss and elected to field.

Match 14
22 August 2026
19:00 (N)
Scorecard

Trinbago Knight Riders; 165/6 (20 overs)	v	Antigua & Barbuda Falcons; 168/5 (18.3 overs)
Colin Munro 46 (33); Rahkeem Cornwall 2/17 (2 overs)		Shadab Khan 52* (20); Terrance Hinds 2/36 (2.3 overs)

Antigua & Barbuda Falcons won by 5 wickets
Sir Vivian Richards Stadium, Antigua
Umpires: Zahid Bassarath (WI) and Carl Tuckett (WI)
Player of the match: Shadab Khan (Antigua & Barbuda Falcons)

- Antigua & Barbuda Falcons won the toss and elected to field.

Match 15
23 August 2026
19:00 (N)
Scorecard

Antigua & Barbuda Falcons; 116 (17 overs)	v	Guyana Amazon Warriors; 121/3 (9.5 overs)
Amir Jangoo 37 (29); Shamar Joseph 3/22 (3 overs)		Shimron Hetmyer 49 (19); Jayden Seales 1/21 (3 overs)

Guyana Amazon Warriors won by 7 wickets
Sir Vivian Richards Stadium, Antigua
Umpires: Zahid Bassarath (WI) and Chris Wright (WI)
Player of the match: Khary Pierre (Guyana Amazon Warriors)

- Guyana Amazon Warriors won the toss and elected to field.

Match 16
25 August 2026
19:00 (N)
Scorecard

Antigua & Barbuda Falcons; 155/5 (20 overs)	v	Barbados Tridents; 125 (18 overs)
Moeen Ali 56 (37); Mujeeb Ur Rahman 2/32 (4 overs)		Rivaldo Clarke 27 (26); Joshua James 3/18 (3 overs)

Antigua & Barbuda Falcons won by 30 runs
Sir Vivian Richards Stadium, Antigua
Umpires: Gregory Brathwaite (WI) and Carl Tuckett (WI)
Player of the match: Joshua James (Antigua & Barbuda Falcons)

- Barbados Tridents won the toss and elected to field.
- Shian Brathwaite (Barbados Tridents) made his T20 debut.
- Sufyan Moqim (Antigua & Barbuda Falcons) took his 100th wicket in T20s.

=== Phase 3 (Trinidad and Saint Kitts) ===
Match 21
30 August 2026
19:00 (N)
Scorecard

St Kitts & Nevis Patriots	v	Antigua & Barbuda Falcons

No result
Warner Park Sporting Complex, Saint Kitts
Umpires: Zahid Bassarath (WI) and Carl Tuckett (WI)

- Antigua & Barbuda Falcons won the toss and elected to field.
- No play was possible due to rain.

Match 24
2 September 2026
19:00 (N)
Scorecard

Antigua & Barbuda Falcons; 183/4 (20 overs)	v	Trinbago Knight Riders; 175/7 (20 overs)
Hassan Nawaz 76 (48); Usman Tariq 1/25 (4 overs)		Joshua Da Silva 54* (31); Rahkeem Cornwall 3/17 (3 overs)

Antigua & Barbuda Falcons won by 8 runs
Queen's Park Oval, Trinidad
Umpires: Deighton Butler (WI) and Christopher Taylor (WI)
Player of the match: Rahkeem Cornwall (Antigua & Barbuda Falcons)

- Trinbago Knight Riders won the toss and elected to field.

=== Phase 4 (Guyana and Barbados) ===
Match 30
8 September 2026
19:00 (N)
Scorecard

Antigua & Barbuda Falcons; 182/5 (20 overs)	v	Guyana Amazon Warriors; 117 (14.2 overs)
Hassan Nawaz 36 (27); Imran Tahir 1/21 (4 overs)		Mavendra Dindyal 25 (13); Alzarri Joseph 4/41 (4 overs)

Antigua & Barbuda Falcons won by 65 runs
Providence Stadium, Guyana
Umpires: Leslie Reifer (WI) and Christopher Taylor (WI)
Player of the match: Shadab Khan (Antigua & Barbuda Falcons)

- Guyana Amazon Warriors won the toss and elected to field.

== Playoffs ==
=== Bracket ===
Qualifier 1
17 September 2026 — Barbados
1	Guyana Amazon Warriors	76 (15 overs)
2	Antigua & Barbuda Falcons	77/1 (5.2 overs)
Eliminator
16 September 2026 — Barbados
3	Barbados Tridents	144/6 (20 overs)
4	Jamaica Kingsmen	145/1 (14.1 overs)

Qualifier 2
18 September 2026 — Barbados
Q1L	Guyana Amazon Warriors	206/4 (20 overs)
EW	Jamaica Kingsmen	207/5 (19.4 overs)

Final
20 September 2026 — Barbados
Q1W	Antigua & Barbuda Falcons	173/2 (16.4 overs)
Q2W	Jamaica Kingsmen	170/9 (20 overs)

- Source: Cricinfo

=== Qualifier 1 ===
Qualifier 1
17 September 2026
20:00 (N)
Scorecard

Guyana Amazon Warriors; 76 (15 overs)	v	Antigua & Barbuda Falcons; 77/1 (5.2 overs)
Glenn Phillips 16 (15); Shai Hope 16 (15); Sufyan Moqim 4/13 (4 overs)		Rahkeem Cornwall 49 (16); Imran Tahir 1/20 (2 overs)

Antigua & Barbuda Falcons won by 9 wickets
Kensington Oval, Barbados
Umpires: Gregory Brathwaite (WI) and Leslie Reifer (WI)
Player of the match: Shadab Khan (Antigua & Barbuda Falcons)

- Antigua & Barbuda Falcons won the toss and elected to field.
- Shadab Khan (Antigua & Barbuda Falcons) took his maiden hat-trick in CPL.

== Final ==
Final
20 September 2026
19:00 (N)
Scorecard

Jamaica Kingsmen; 170/9 (20 overs)	v	Antigua & Barbuda Falcons; 173/2 (16.4 overs)
Maaz Sadaqat 114 (58); Sufyan Moqim 4/14 (4 overs)		Amir Jangoo 57 (34); Vitel Lawes 1/32 (4 overs)

Antigua & Barbuda Falcons won by 8 wickets
Kensington Oval, Barbados
Umpires: Zahid Bassarath (WI) and Deighton Butler (WI)

- Antigua & Barbuda Falcons won the toss and elected to field.
