= 2026 Jamaica Kingsmen season =

Overview of Jamaica Kingsmen in 2026 Caribbean Premier League

Jamaica Kingsmen
2026 season
- Coach: Grant Bradburn
- Captain(s): Rovman Powell
- Home ground: Sabina Park
- League: Caribbean Premier League
- 2026 Caribbean Premier League: 4th

The 2026 Jamaica Kingsmen season is the first season of the franchise in the Caribbean Premier League. The team is captained by Rovman Powell and coached by Grant Bradburn.

== Current squads ==
The following players were retained, signed or drafted by their respective teams.

== Standings ==
=== Points table ===
Pos	Team	Pld	W	L	NR	Pts	NRR	Qualification
1	Guyana Amazon Warriors	9	8	1	0	16	0.954	Advanced to Qualifier 1
2	Antigua & Barbuda Falcons	10	6	3	1	13	0.174	Advanced to Qualifier 1
3	Barbados Tridents	9	5	4	0	10	−0.381	Advanced to Eliminator
4	Jamaica Kingsmen	10	4	6	0	8	−0.085	Advanced to Eliminator
5	Saint Lucia Kings	10	4	6	0	8	−0.887	Eliminated
6	St Kitts & Nevis Patriots	10	3	6	1	7	0.252	Eliminated
7	Trinbago Knight Riders	10	3	7	0	6	−0.010	Eliminated

Updated to match(es) played on 13 September 2026. Source: Cricinfo

=== Match summary ===
Team	League stage										Knockout stage		
Team	1	2	3	4	5	6	7	8	9	10	Q/E	C	F
Jamaica Kingsmen	0	0	0	2	4	4	6	8	8				

Win	Loss	Tie	No Result

== Fixtures ==
On 28 April 2026, Cricket West Indies confirmed the full schedule for the tournament, which featured 39 matches to be played across eight venues.

=== Phase 1 (Saint Vincent) ===
Match 1
7 August 2026
19:00 (N)
Scorecard

Jamaica Kingsmen; 167/7 (20 overs)	v	Antigua & Barbuda Falcons; 168/8 (20 overs)
Rovman Powell 47 (37); Alzarri Joseph 3/34 (4 overs)		Tajinder Singh 62 (37); Keemo Paul 3/29 (4 overs)

Antigua & Barbuda Falcons won by 2 wickets
Arnos Vale Stadium, Saint Vincent
Umpires: Deighton Butler (WI) and Christopher Taylor (WI)
Player of the match: Alzarri Joseph (Antigua and Barbuda Falcons)

- Antigua and Barbuda Falcons won the toss and elected to field.
- This was the first CPL match played at this venue.

=== Phase 2 (Antigua, Jamaica and Saint Lucia) ===
Match 4
11 August 2026
19:00 (N)
Scorecard

Barbados Tridents; 206/3 (20 overs)	v	Jamaica Kingsmen; 201/9 (20 overs)
Brandon King 73 (51); Hassan Khan 1/19 (3 overs)		Andre Russell 68 (38); Daniel Sams 4/20 (4 overs)

Barbados Tridents won by 5 runs
Sabina Park, Jamaica
Umpires: Gregory Brathwaite (WI) and Chris Wright (WI)
Player of the match: Daniel Sams (Barbados Tridents)

- Jamaica Kingsmen won the toss and elected to field.

Match 6
13 August 2026
19:00 (N)
Scorecard

Jamaica Kingsmen; 117 (19.4 overs)	v	Guyana Amazon Warriors; 118/4 (14.1 overs)
Reeza Hendricks 40 (32); Mohammad Nabi 4/22 (4 overs)		Shai Hope 56* (41); Andre Russell 2/12 (2 overs)

Guyana Amazon Warriors won by 6 wickets
Sabina Park, Jamaica
Umpires: Zahid Bassarath (WI) and Carl Tuckett (WI)
Player of the match: Mohammad Nabi (Guyana Amazon Warriors)

- Guyana Amazon Warriors won the toss and elected to field.
- Mavendra Dindyal (Guyana Amazon Warriors) made his T20 debut.

Match 8
15 August 2026
19:00 (N)
Scorecard

Trinbago Knight Riders; 182/6 (20 overs)	v	Jamaica Kingsmen; 183/5 (18.4 overs)
Kieron Pollard 44 (22); Hunain Shah 2/31 (4 overs)		Kirk McKenzie 69 (25); Usman Tariq 3/21 (4 overs)

Jamaica Kingsmen won by 5 wickets
Sabina Park, Jamaica
Umpires: Zahid Bassarath (WI) and Chris Wright (WI)
Player of the match: Kirk McKenzie (Jamaica Kingsmen)

- Jamaica Kingsmen won the toss and elected to field.

Match 10
18 August 2026
19:00 (N)
Scorecard

Jamaica Kingsmen; 181/6 (20 overs)	v	St Kitts & Nevis Patriots; 130 (18 overs)
Keemo Paul 65 (36); Wanindu Hasaranga 2/36 (4 overs)		Kevin Wickham 37 (34); Keemo Paul 3/30 (4 overs)

Jamaica Kingsmen won by 51 runs
Sabina Park, Jamaica
Umpires: Gregory Brathwaite (WI) and Carl Tuckett (WI)
Player of the match: Keemo Paul (Jamaica Kingsmen)

- St Kitts & Nevis Patriots won the toss and elected to field.

Match 13
21 August 2026
19:00 (N)
Scorecard

Jamaica Kingsmen; 169/9 (20 overs)	v	Saint Lucia Kings; 171/4 (18.2 overs)
Keacy Carty 50 (45); Matthew Forde 5/23 (4)		Kamil Pooran 81* (49); Vitel Lawes 2/22 (3)

Saint Lucia Kings won by 6 wickets
Daren Sammy Cricket Ground, Saint Lucia
Umpires: Leslie Reifer (WI) and Christopher Taylor (WI)
Player of the match: Matthew Forde (Saint Lucia Kings)

- Saint Lucia Kings won the toss and elected to field.
- Matthew Forde (Saint Lucia Kings) took his maiden five-wicket haul in T20s.
- Usman Khan (Jamaica Kingsmen) scored his 3,000th runs in T20s.

=== Phase 3 (Trinidad and Saint Kitts) ===
Match 18
27 August 2026
19:00 (N)
Scorecard

Jamaica Kingsmen; 182/7 (20 overs)	v	St Kitts & Nevis Patriots; 171/6 (20 overs)
Saim Ayub 102 (58); Wanindu Hasaranga 2/18 (4 overs)		Andre Fletcher 55 (38); Hunain Shah 2/23 (4 overs)

Jamaica Kingsmen won by 11 runs
Warner Park Sporting Complex, Saint Kitts
Umpires: Gregory Brathwaite (WI) and Chris Wright (WI)
Player of the match: Saim Ayub (Jamaica Kingsmen)

- St Kitts & Nevis Patriots won the toss and elected to field.

Match 20
29 August 2026
19:00 (N)
Scorecard

Trinbago Knight Riders; 180/6 (20 overs)	v	Jamaica Kingsmen; 127/3 (14.4 overs)
Nicholas Pooran 60* (37); Vitel Lawes 3/29 (4 overs)		Keacy Carty 42 (33); Jyd Goolie 2/30 (4 overs)

Jamaica Kingsmen won by 7 runs (DLS method)
Queen's Park Oval, Trinidad
Umpires: Ryan Banwarie (WI) and Deighton Butler (WI)
Player of the match: Vitel Lawes (Jamaica Kingsmen)

- Jamaica Kingsmen won the toss and elected to field.
- Jamaica Kingsmen were 7 runs ahead of DLS par score of 120 runs from 14.4 overs.
- Rain prevented any further play.

=== Phase 4 (Guyana and Barbados) ===
Match 26
4 September 2026
19:00 (N)
Scorecard

Jamaica Kingsmen; 159/7 (20 overs)	v	Guyana Amazon Warriors; 160/2 (17.2 overs)
Hassan Khan 62* (29); Dwaine Pretorius 2/20 (3 overs)		Rahmanullah Gurbaz 54 (35); Maaz Sadaqat 1/6 (1 over)

Guyana Amazon Warriors won by 8 wickets
Providence Stadium, Guyana
Umpires: Ryan Banwarie (WI) and Leslie Reifer (WI)
Player of the match: Dwaine Pretorius (Guyana Amazon Warriors)

- Guyana Amazon Warriors won the toss and elected to field.
- Mohammad Nabi (Guyana Amazon Warriors) played in his 500th match in T20s.
- Rahmanullah Gurbaz (Guyana Amazon Warriors) scored his 7,000th runs in T20s.

Match 34
12 September 2026
20:00 (N)
Scorecard

Jamaica Kingsmen; 150/9 (20 overs)	v	Barbados Tridents; 151/8 (20 overs)
Maaz Sadaqat 47 (34); Jakeem Pollard 3/38 (4 overs)		Shadrack Descarte 56 (42); Hunain Shah 2/25 (4 overs)

Barbados Tridents won by 2 wickets
Kensington Oval, Barbados
Umpires: Gregory Brathwaite (WI) and Carl Tuckett (WI)
Player of the match: Gudakesh Motie (Barbados Tridents)

- Barbados Tridents won the toss and elected to field.
