= 2026 St Kitts & Nevis Patriots season =

St Kitts & Nevis Patriots
2026 season
- Coach: Simon Helmot
- Captain: Jason Holder
- Overseas player: Dasun Shanaka; Nikhil Chaudhary; Wanindu Hasaranga; Naseem Shah; Waqar Salamkheil
- Ground(s): Queen's Park Oval
- League Stage: 6th
- Most runs: -
- Most wickets: -

The 2026 St Kitts & Nevis Patriots season is the fourteenth season of the franchise in the Caribbean Premier League. The team is captained by Jason Holder and coached by Simon Helmot.

== Current squads ==
The following players were retained, signed or drafted by their respective teams.

- Players with international caps are listed in **bold**.

As of 28 July 2026

No.	Name	Nationality	Birth date	Batting style	Bowling style	Year signed	Notes
Batsmen
—N/a	**Alick Athanaze**	Dominica	7 December 1998 (age 27)	Left-handed	Right-arm off break	2025	
—N/a	**Navin Bidaisee**	Trinidad and Tobago	24 March 2000 (age 26)	Left-handed	Right-arm off break	2025	
	Kevin Wickham	Barbados	19 March 2003 (age 23)	Right-handed	Right-arm Off Spin	2026	
—N/a	**Mikyle Louis**	Saint Kitts and Nevis	19 August 2000 (age 26)	Right-handed	Right-arm leg break	2024	
All-rounders
7	**Dasun Shanaka**	Sri Lanka	9 September 1991 (age 35)	Right-handed	Right-arm medium	2026	Overseas
98	**Jason Holder**	Barbados	5 November 1991 (age 34)	Right-handed	Right arm medium fast	2025	**Captain**
71	**Kyle Mayers**	Barbados	8 September 1992 (age 34)	Left-handed	Right-arm medium	2024	
4	**Nikhil Chaudhary**	Australia	4 May 1996 (age 30)	Right-handed	Right-arm off spin	2026	Overseas
49	**Wanindu Hasaranga**	Sri Lanka	29 July 1997 (age 29)	Right-handed	Right-arm leg-break	2026	Overseas
Wicket-keepers
72	**Andre Fletcher**	Grenada	28 November 1987 (age 38)	Right-handed		2022	
25	**Johnson Charles**	Saint Lucia	14 January 1989 (age 37)	Right-handed		2026	
Bowlers
—N/a	**Obed McCoy**	Saint Vincent and the Grenadines	4 January 1997 (age 29)	Left-handed	Left-arm fast-medium	2026	
—N/a	Jeremiah Louis	Saint Kitts and Nevis	12 March 1996 (age 30)	Right-handed	Right-arm medium-fast	2024	
—N/a	Micah McKenzie	Antigua and Barbuda	18 January 2007 (age 19)	Right-handed	Right-arm leg spin	2026	
—N/a	Ashmead Nedd	Guyana	10 January 2001 (age 25)	Right-handed	Left-arm orthodox	2025	
6	**Waqar Salamkheil**	Afghanistan	2 October 2001 (age 24)	Right-handed	Left-arm unorthodox spin	2025	Overseas
77	**Naseem Shah**	Pakistan	15 February 2003 (age 23)	Right-handed	Right-arm fast	2025	Overseas

- Source:St Kitts & Nevis Patriots Players

== Standings ==
=== Points table ===
Pos	Team	Pld	W	L	NR	Pts	NRR	Qualification
1	Guyana Amazon Warriors	8	7	1	0	14	1.029	Advanced to Qualifier 1
2	Antigua & Barbuda Falcons	10	6	3	1	13	0.174	Advanced to Qualifier 1
3	Jamaica Kingsmen	9	4	5	0	8	−0.096	Advanced to Eliminator
4	Saint Lucia Kings	10	4	6	0	8	−0.887	Advanced to Eliminator
5	St Kitts & Nevis Patriots	9	3	5	1	7	0.405	
6	Trinbago Knight Riders	9	3	6	0	6	0.066	
7	Barbados Tridents	7	3	4	0	6	−0.645	

Updated to match(es) played on 9 September 2026. Source: Cricinfo

=== Match summary ===
Team	League stage										Knockout stage		
Team	1	2	3	4	5	6	7	8	9	10	Q/E	C	F
St Kitts & Nevis Patriots	0	2	2	2	2	3	5	7	7				

Win	Loss	Tie	No Result

== Fixtures ==
On 28 April 2026, Cricket West Indies confirmed the full schedule for the tournament, which featured 39 matches to be played across eight venues.

=== Phase 1 (Saint Vincent) ===
Match 2
8 August 2026
19:00 (N)
Scorecard

St Kitts & Nevis Patriots; 109/9 (20 overs)	v	Trinbago Knight Riders; 94/2 (15 overs)
Kevin Wickham 38 (44); Sunil Narine 3/7 (4)		Matthew Breetzke 35* (35); Jason Holder 1/13 (3 overs)

Trinbago Knight Riders won by 19 runs (DLS method)
Arnos Vale Stadium, Saint Vincent
Umpires: Ryan Banwarie (WI) and Leslie Reifer (WI)
Player of the match: Sunil Narine (Trinbago Knight Riders)

- Trinbago Knight Riders won the toss and elected to field.
- No further play was possible due to rain.
- Trinbago Knight Riders were 19 runs ahead of DLS par score of 76 runs from 15 overs.
- Dexter Sween (Trinbago Knight Riders) made his T20 debut.

=== Phase 2 (Antigua, Jamaica and Saint Lucia) ===
Match 5
12 August 2026
19:00 (N)
Scorecard

Saint Lucia Kings; 155/8 (20 overs)	v	St Kitts & Nevis Patriots; 156/5 (17.4 overs)
Jewel Andrew 58 (42); Jason Holder 3/20 (4 overs)		Andre Fletcher 48* (41); Maheesh Theekshana 2/22 (4 overs)

St Kitts & Nevis Patriots won by 5 wickets
Daren Sammy Cricket Ground, Saint Lucia
Umpires: Leslie Reifer (WI) and Christopher Taylor (WI)
Player of the match: Andre Fletcher (St Kitts & Nevis Patriots)

- Saint Lucia Kings won the toss and elected to bat.
- Andre Fletcher (St Kitts & Nevis Patriots) scored his 9,000th runs in T20s.

Match 10
18 August 2026
19:00 (N)
Scorecard

Jamaica Kingsmen; 181/6 (20 overs)	v	St Kitts & Nevis Patriots; 130 (18 overs)
Keemo Paul 65 (36); Wanindu Hasaranga 2/36 (4 overs)		Kevin Wickham 37 (34); Keemo Paul 3/30 (4 overs)

Jamaica Kingsmen won by 51 runs
Sabina Park, Jamaica
Umpires: Gregory Brathwaite (WI) and Carl Tuckett (WI)
Player of the match: Keemo Paul (Jamaica Kingsmen)

- St Kitts & Nevis Patriots won the toss and elected to field.

Match 12
20 August 2026
19:00 (N)
Scorecard

St Kitts & Nevis Patriots; 187/6 (20 overs)	v	Antigua & Barbuda Falcons; 191/7 (19.3 overs)
Dasun Shanaka 49* (17); Shamar Springer 2/42 (4 overs)		Evin Lewis 48 (38); Jason Holder 2/39 (4 overs)

Antigua & Barbuda Falcons won by 3 wickets
Sir Vivian Richards Stadium, Antigua
Umpires: Gregory Brathwaite (WI) and Chris Wright (WI)
Player of the match: Shadab Khan (Antigua & Barbuda Falcons)

- Antigua & Barbuda Falcons won the toss and elected to field.

=== Phase 3 (Trinidad and Saint Kitts) ===
Match 18
27 August 2026
19:00 (N)
Scorecard

Jamaica Kingsmen; 182/7 (20 overs)	v	St Kitts & Nevis Patriots; 171/6 (20 overs)
Saim Ayub 102 (58); Wanindu Hasaranga 2/18 (4 overs)		Andre Fletcher 55 (38); Hunain Shah 2/23 (4 overs)

Jamaica Kingsmen won by 11 runs
Warner Park Sporting Complex, Saint Kitts
Umpires: Gregory Brathwaite (WI) and Chris Wright (WI)
Player of the match: Saim Ayub (Jamaica Kingsmen)

- St Kitts & Nevis Patriots won the toss and elected to field.

Match 21
30 August 2026
19:00 (N)
Scorecard

St Kitts & Nevis Patriots	v	Antigua & Barbuda Falcons

No result
Warner Park Sporting Complex, Saint Kitts
Umpires: Zahid Bassarath (WI) and Carl Tuckett (WI)

- Antigua & Barbuda Falcons won the toss and elected to field.
- No play was possible due to rain.

Match 23
1 September 2026
19:00 (N)
Scorecard

Barbados Tridents; 217/4 (20 overs)	v	St Kitts & Nevis Patriots; 220/4 (19.1 overs)
Quinton de Kock 106 (57); Naseem Shah 2/43 (4 overs)		Johnson Charles 78 (45); Daniel Sams 2/40 (4 overs)

St Kitts & Nevis Patriots won by 6 wickets
Warner Park Sporting Complex, Saint Kitts
Umpires: Zahid Bassarath (WI) and Chris Wright (WI)
Player of the match: Johnson Charles (St Kitts & Nevis Patriots)

- St Kitts & Nevis Patriots won the toss and elected to field.

Match 25
3 September 2026
19:00 (N)
Scorecard

St Kitts & Nevis Patriots; 235/4 (20 overs)	v	Saint Lucia Kings; 98 (13.5 overs)
Dasun Shanaka 121* (43); Matthew Forde 2/48 (4 overs)		Tim Seifert 50 (36); Jeremiah Louis 5/10 (2.5 overs)

St Kitts & Nevis Patriots won by 137 runs
Warner Park Sporting Complex, Saint Kitts
Umpires: Gregory Brathwaite (WI) and Carl Tuckett (WI)
Player of the match: Dasun Shanaka (St Kitts & Nevis Patriots)

- Saint Lucia Kings won the toss and elected to field.
- Dasun Shanaka (St Kitts & Nevis Patriots) scored the fastest century (off 39 balls) in CPL.
- Jeremiah Louis (St Kitts & Nevis Patriots) took his maiden five-wicket haul in T20s.

=== Phase 4 (Guyana and Barbados) ===
Match 28
6 September 2026
15:00
Scorecard

St Kitts & Nevis Patriots; 128 (19.2 overs)	v	Guyana Amazon Warriors; 132/3 (18.3 overs)
Alick Athanaze 52 (39); Mohammad Nabi 4/17 (4 overs)		Rahmanullah Gurbaz 39 (25); Navin Bidaisee 2/20 (4 overs)

Guyana Amazon Warriors won by 7 wickets
Providence Stadium, Guyana
Umpires: Ryan Banwarie (WI) and Deighton Butler (WI)
Player of the match: Mohammad Nabi (Guyana Amazon Warriors)

- St Kitts & Nevis Patriots won the toss and elected to bat.

Match 32
10 September 2026
19:00 (N)
Scorecard

St Kitts & Nevis Patriots	v	Barbados Tridents

Kensington Oval, Barbados
Umpires: Zahid Bassarath (WI) and Chris Wright (WI)

- Barbados Tridents won the toss and elected to field.
