= 2026 Saint Lucia Kings season =

Overview of Saint Lucia Kings in 2026 Caribbean Premier League

Saint Lucia Kings
2026 season
- Coach: Daren Sammy
- Captain(s): Roston Chase
- Home ground: Daren Sammy Cricket Ground
- League: Caribbean Premier League

The 2026 Saint Lucia Kings season is the fifth season of the franchise under the Saint Lucia Kings name in the Caribbean Premier League. The team is captained by Roston Chase.

== Current squads ==
The following players were retained, signed or drafted by their respective teams.

- Players with international caps are listed in **bold**.

As of 29 July 2026

| No. | Name | Nat. | Birth date | Batting style | Bowling style | Year signed | Notes |
Batsman
| —N/a | **Ackeem Auguste** | Saint Lucia | 12 September 2003 (age 22) | Left-handed | Right-arm off spin | 2025 | |
| —N/a | Johann Jeremiah | Grenada | 2 October 1999 (age 26) | Left-handed | Right-arm off spin | 2025 | |
| | Kamil Pooran | Trinidad and Tobago | 13 June 1996 (age 30) | Right-handed | Right arm medium | 2026 | |
All-rounders
| 10 | **Roston Chase** | Barbados | 22 March 1992 (age 34) | Right-handed | Right-arm off spin | 2020 | |
| —N/a | Shadrack Descarte | Saint Lucia | 18 October 1997 (age 28) | Left-handed | Right-arm medium-fast | 2023 | |
| —N/a | Javelle Glen | Jamaica | 26 February 1998 (age 28) | Left-handed | Right-arm leg spin | 2025 | |
| —N/a | **Khary Pierre** | Trinidad and Tobago | 22 September 1991 (age 34) | Left-handed | Left-arm orthodox | 2023 | |
| 72 | **Charith Asalanka** | Sri Lanka | 29 June 1997 (age 29) | Left-handed | Right-arm Off Spin | 2026 | Overseas |
Wicket-keepers
| 43 | **Tim Seifert** | New Zealand | 14 December 1994 (age 31) | Right-handed | | 2025 | Overseas |
Spin bowlers
| —N/a | Micah McKenzie | Antigua and Barbuda | 18 January 2007 (age 19) | Right-handed | Right-arm leg spin | 2025 | |
| 61 | **Maheesh Theekshana** | Sri Lanka | 1 August 2000 (age 26) | Right-handed | Right arm Off break | 2026 | Overseas |
| 15 | **Noor Ahmad** | Afghanistan | 3 January 2005 (age 21) | Right-handed | Left-arm unorthodox | 2026 | Overseas |
Pace bowlers
| —N/a | **Matthew Forde** | Barbados | 29 April 2002 (age 24) | Right-handed | Right arm medium | 2022 | |
| 37 | **Shadley van Schalkwyk** | United States | 15 August 1988 (age 38) | Right-handed | Right arm medium | 2026 | |
| —N/a | Keon Gaston | Saint Lucia | 9 June 2003 (age 23) | Right-handed | Right arm medium | 2025 | |
| —N/a | **Alzarri Joseph** | Antigua and Barbuda | 20 November 1996 (age 29) | Right-handed | Right-arm medium-fast | 2021 | |

- Source: St Lucia Kings players

== Standings ==
=== Points table ===
| Pos | Team | Pld | W | L | NR | Pts | NRR | Qualification |
|---|---|---|---|---|---|---|---|---|
| 1 | Antigua & Barbuda Falcons (Q) | 10 | 6 | 3 | 1 | 13 | −0.267 | Advanced to Qualifier 1 |
| 2 | Guyana Amazon Warriors | 7 | 6 | 1 | 0 | 12 | 1.977 | Advanced to Qualifier 1 |
| 3 | Jamaica Kingsmen | 9 | 4 | 5 | 0 | 8 | 0.052 | Advanced to Eliminator |
| 4 | Saint Lucia Kings | 9 | 4 | 5 | 0 | 8 | −0.888 | Advanced to Eliminator |
| 5 | St Kitts & Nevis Patriots | 9 | 3 | 5 | 1 | 7 | 0.405 | |
| 6 | Trinbago Knight Riders | 9 | 3 | 6 | 0 | 6 | −0.167 | |
| 7 | Barbados Tridents | 7 | 3 | 4 | 0 | 6 | −0.784 | |

Updated to match(es) played on 9 September 2026. Source: Cricinfo
(Q) Qualified for the phase indicated

=== Match summary ===
| Team | League stage | | | | | | | | | | Knockout stage | | |
| Team | 1 | 2 | 3 | 4 | 5 | 6 | 7 | 8 | 9 | 10 | Q/E | C | F |
|---|---|---|---|---|---|---|---|---|---|---|---|---|---|
| Saint Lucia Kings | 2 | 2 | 4 | 4 | 4 | 6 | 8 | 8 | 8 | | | | |

| Win | Loss | Tie | No Result |

== Fixtures ==
On 28 April 2026, Cricket West Indies confirmed the full schedule for the tournament, which featured 39 matches to be played across eight venues.

=== Phase 1 (Saint Vincent) ===
Match 3
9 August 2026
19:00 (N)
Scorecard

| Saint Lucia Kings; 187/8 (20 overs) | v | Antigua & Barbuda Falcons; 183/7 (20 overs) |
| Andries Gous 82 (51); Alzarri Joseph 3/32 (4 overs) | | Evin Lewis 48 (24); Roston Chase 2/18 (4 overs); Maheesh Theekshana 2/18 (4 overs) |

Saint Lucia Kings won by 4 runs
Arnos Vale Stadium, Saint Vincent
Umpires: Ryan Banwarie (WI) and Deighton Butler (WI)
Player of the match: Andries Gous (Saint Lucia Kings)

- Saint Lucia Kings won the toss and elected to bat.
- Darren Nedd and Kamil Pooran (Saint Lucia Kings) both made their T20 debuts.

=== Phase 2 (Antigua, Jamaica and Saint Lucia) ===
Match 5
12 August 2026
19:00 (N)
Scorecard

| Saint Lucia Kings; 155/8 (20 overs) | v | St Kitts & Nevis Patriots; 156/5 (17.4 overs) |
| Jewel Andrew 58 (42); Jason Holder 3/20 (4 overs) | | Andre Fletcher 48* (41); Maheesh Theekshana 2/22 (4 overs) |

St Kitts & Nevis Patriots won by 5 wickets
Daren Sammy Cricket Ground, Saint Lucia
Umpires: Leslie Reifer (WI) and Christopher Taylor (WI)
Player of the match: Andre Fletcher (St Kitts & Nevis Patriots)

- Saint Lucia Kings won the toss and elected to bat.
- Andre Fletcher (St Kitts & Nevis Patriots) scored his 9,000th runs in T20s.

Match 7
14 August 2026
19:00 (N)
Scorecard

| Antigua & Barbuda Falcons; 98/9 (19 overs) | v | Saint Lucia Kings; 54/7 (7.4 overs) |
| Rahkeem Cornwall 26 (17); Matthew Forde 4/29 (4 overs) | | Joshua Bishop 12* (10); Shamar Springer 3/13 (2 overs) |

Saint Lucia Kings won by 3 wickets (DLS method)
Daren Sammy Cricket Ground, Saint Lucia
Umpires: Deighton Butler (WI) and Christopher Taylor (WI)
Player of the match: Matthew Forde (Saint Lucia Kings)

- Saint Lucia Kings won the toss and elected to field.
- The match was reduced to 19 overs per side due to rain.
- Saint Lucia Kings were set a revised target of 52 runs off 8 overs due to rain.

Match 9
16 August 2026
19:00 (N)
Scorecard

| Barbados Tridents; 177/5 (18 overs) | v | Saint Lucia Kings; 168/7 (18 overs) |
| Sherfane Rutherford 61 (31); Shadley van Schalkwyk 2/25 (3 overs) | | Ackeem Auguste 63 (34); Gudakesh Motie 3/22 (4 overs) |

Barbados Tridents won by 9 runs
Daren Sammy Cricket Ground, Saint Lucia
Umpires: Ryan Banwarie (WI) and Leslie Reifer (WI)
Player of the match: Sherfane Rutherford (Barbados Tridents)

- Saint Lucia Kings won the toss and elected to field.
- The match was reduced to 18 overs per side due to rain.
- Amari Goodridge (Saint Lucia Kings) made his T20 debut.

Match 11
19 August 2026
19:00 (N)
Scorecard

| Saint Lucia Kings; 151/7 (20 overs) | v | Guyana Amazon Warriors; 157/3 (18.1 overs) |
| Charith Asalanka 35 (28); Dwaine Pretorius 3/29 (4 overs) | | Mavendra Dindyal 50 (51); Maheesh Theekshana 2/33 (3.1 overs) |

Guyana Amazon Warriors won by 7 wickets
Daren Sammy Cricket Ground, Saint Lucia
Umpires: Ryan Banwarie (WI) and Deighton Butler (WI)
Player of the match: Dwaine Pretorius (Guyana Amazon Warriors)

- Guyana Amazon Warriors won the toss and elected to field.

Match 13
21 August 2026
19:00 (N)
Scorecard

| Jamaica Kingsmen; 169/9 (20 overs) | v | Saint Lucia Kings; 171/4 (18.2 overs) |
| Keacy Carty 50 (45); Matthew Forde 5/23 (4) | | Kamil Pooran 81* (49); Vitel Lawes 2/22 (3) |

Saint Lucia Kings won by 6 wickets
Daren Sammy Cricket Ground, Saint Lucia
Umpires: Leslie Reifer (WI) and Christopher Taylor (WI)
Player of the match: Matthew Forde (Saint Lucia Kings)

- Saint Lucia Kings won the toss and elected to field.
- Matthew Forde (Saint Lucia Kings) took his maiden five-wicket haul in T20s.
- Usman Khan (Jamaica Kingsmen) scored his 3,000th runs in T20s.

=== Phase 3 (Trinidad and Saint Kitts) ===
Match 17
26 August 2026
19:00 (N)
Scorecard

| Saint Lucia Kings; 211/4 (20 overs) | v | Trinbago Knight Riders; 175/6 (20 overs) |
| Tim Seifert 105* (61); Kieron Pollard 1/24 (3 overs) | | Kieron Pollard 65 (26); Roston Chase 3/24 (4 overs) |

Saint Lucia Kings won by 36 runs
Queen's Park Oval, Trinidad
Umpires: Deighton Butler (WI) and Christopher Taylor (WI)
Player of the match: Tim Seifert (Saint Lucia Kings)

- Trinbago Knight Riders won the toss and elected to field.
- Abdul-Raheem Toppin (Trinbago Knight Riders) made his T20 debut.

Match 25
3 September 2026
19:00 (N)
Scorecard

| St Kitts & Nevis Patriots; 235/4 (20 overs) | v | Saint Lucia Kings; 98 (13.5 overs) |
| Dasun Shanaka 121* (43); Matthew Forde 2/48 (4 overs) | | Tim Seifert 50 (36); Jeremiah Louis 5/10 (2.5 overs) |

St Kitts & Nevis Patriots won by 137 runs
Warner Park Sporting Complex, Saint Kitts
Umpires: Gregory Brathwaite (WI) and Carl Tuckett (WI)
Player of the match: Dasun Shanaka (St Kitts & Nevis Patriots)

- Saint Lucia Kings won the toss and elected to field.
- Dasun Shanaka (St Kitts & Nevis Patriots) scored the fastest century (off 39 balls) in CPL.
- Jeremiah Louis (St Kitts & Nevis Patriots) took his maiden five-wicket haul in T20s.

=== Phase 4 (Guyana and Barbados) ===
Match 29
6 September 2026
19:00 (N)
Scorecard

| Saint Lucia Kings; 138/6 (20 overs) | v | Barbados Tridents; 139/2 (17.5 overs) |
| Kamil Pooran 37 (24); Mujeeb Ur Rahman 3/22 (4 overs) | | Quinton de Kock 47* (31); Joshua Bishop 1/24 (3 overs) |

Barbados Tridents won by 8 wickets
Kensington Oval, Barbados
Umpires: Gregory Brathwaite (WI) and Carl Tuckett (WI)
Player of the match: Mujeeb Ur Rahman (Barbados Tridents)

- Barbados Tridents won the toss and elected to field.

Match 31
9 September 2026
19:00 (N)
Scorecard

| Saint Lucia Kings | v | Guyana Amazon Warriors |

Providence Stadium, Guyana
Umpires: Deighton Butler (WI) and Christopher Taylor (WI)

- Saint Lucia Kings won the toss and elected to bat.
- Kemol Savory (Saint Lucia Kings) made his T20 debut.
