= 2026 Barbados Tridents season =

Overview of Barbados Tridents in 2026 Caribbean Premier League

Barbados Tridents
2026 season
- Coach: Trevor Penney
- Captain(s): Chris Green
- Home ground: Kensington Oval
- League: Caribbean Premier League
- League Stage: 3rd
- Knockout stage: –
- Leading Run Scorer: –
- Leading Wicket Taker: –

The 2026 Barbados Tridents season is the first season of the franchise in the Caribbean Premier League. The team is captained by Chris Green and coached by Trevor Penney.

== Current squads ==
The following players were retained, signed or drafted by their respective teams.

== Standings ==
=== Points table ===
Pos	Team	Pld	W	L	NR	Pts	NRR	Qualification
1	Guyana Amazon Warriors	10	8	2	0	16	0.615	Advanced to Qualifier 1
2	Antigua & Barbuda Falcons	10	6	3	1	13	0.174	Advanced to Qualifier 1
3	Barbados Tridents	10	6	4	0	12	−0.125	Advanced to Eliminator
4	Jamaica Kingsmen	10	4	6	0	8	−0.085	Advanced to Eliminator
5	Saint Lucia Kings	10	4	6	0	8	−0.887	Eliminated
6	St Kitts & Nevis Patriots	10	3	6	1	7	0.252	Eliminated
7	Trinbago Knight Riders	10	3	7	0	6	−0.010	Eliminated

Updated to match(es) played on 14 September 2026. Source: Cricinfo

=== Match summary ===
Team	League stage										Knockout stage		
Team	1	2	3	4	5	6	7	8	9	10	Q/E	C	F
Barbados Tridents	2	4	4	4	4	4	6	8	10	12			

Win	Loss	Tie	No Result

== Fixtures ==
On 28 April 2026, Cricket West Indies confirmed the full schedule for the tournament, which featured 10 matches for Barbados Tridents to be played across six venues.

=== Phase 2 (Antigua, Jamaica and Saint Lucia) ===
Match 4
11 August 2026
19:00 (N)
Scorecard

Barbados Tridents; 206/3 (20 overs)	v	Jamaica Kingsmen; 201/9 (20 overs)
Brandon King 73 (51); Hassan Khan 1/19 (3 overs)		Andre Russell 68 (38); Daniel Sams 4/20 (4 overs)

Barbados Tridents won by 5 runs
Sabina Park, Jamaica
Umpires: Gregory Brathwaite (WI) and Chris Wright (WI)
Player of the match: Daniel Sams (Barbados Tridents)

- Jamaica Kingsmen won the toss and elected to field.

Match 9
16 August 2026
19:00 (N)
Scorecard

Barbados Tridents; 177/5 (18 overs)	v	Saint Lucia Kings; 168/7 (18 overs)
Sherfane Rutherford 61 (31); Shadley van Schalkwyk 2/25 (3 overs)		Ackeem Auguste 63 (34); Gudakesh Motie 3/22 (4 overs)

Barbados Tridents won by 9 runs
Daren Sammy Cricket Ground, Saint Lucia
Umpires: Ryan Banwarie (WI) and Leslie Reifer (WI)
Player of the match: Sherfane Rutherford (Barbados Tridents)

- Saint Lucia Kings won the toss and elected to field.
- The match was reduced to 18 overs per side due to rain.
- Amari Goodridge (Saint Lucia Kings) made his T20 debut.

Match 16
25 August 2026
19:00 (N)
Scorecard

Antigua & Barbuda Falcons; 155/5 (20 overs)	v	Barbados Tridents; 125 (18 overs)
Moeen Ali 56 (37); Mujeeb Ur Rahman 2/32 (4 overs)		Rivaldo Clarke 27 (26); Joshua James 3/18 (3 overs)

Antigua & Barbuda Falcons won by 30 runs
Sir Vivian Richards Stadium, Antigua
Umpires: Gregory Brathwaite (WI) and Carl Tuckett (WI)
Player of the match: Joshua James (Antigua & Barbuda Falcons)

- Barbados Tridents won the toss and elected to field.
- Shian Brathwaite (Barbados Tridents) made his T20 debut.
- Sufyan Moqim (Antigua & Barbuda Falcons) took his 100th wicket in T20s.

=== Phase 3 (Trinidad and Saint Kitts) ===
Match 19
28 August 2026
20:00 (N)
Scorecard

Barbados Tridents; 127/9 (20 overs)	v	Trinbago Knight Riders; 128/3 (14.5 overs)
Zachary Carter 28 (27); Sunil Narine 2/14 (4 overs)		Sunil Narine 55 (33); Ramon Simmonds 1/20 (2.5 overs)

Trinbago Knight Riders won by 7 wickets
Queen's Park Oval, Trinidad
Umpires: Ryan Banwarie (WI) and Leslie Reifer (WI)
Player of the match: Sunil Narine (Trinbago Knight Riders)

- Trinbago Knight Riders won the toss and elected to field.

Match 23
1 September 2026
19:00 (N)
Scorecard

Barbados Tridents; 217/4 (20 overs)	v	St Kitts & Nevis Patriots; 220/4 (19.1 overs)
Quinton de Kock 106 (57); Naseem Shah 2/43 (4 overs)		Johnson Charles 78 (45); Daniel Sams 2/40 (4 overs)

St Kitts & Nevis Patriots won by 6 wickets
Warner Park Sporting Complex, Saint Kitts
Umpires: Zahid Bassarath (WI) and Chris Wright (WI)
Player of the match: Johnson Charles (St Kitts & Nevis Patriots)

- St Kitts & Nevis Patriots won the toss and elected to field.

=== Phase 4 (Guyana and Barbados) ===
Match 27
5 September 2026
20:00 (N)
Scorecard

Trinbago Knight Riders; 147/6 (20 overs)	v	Barbados Tridents; 112 (18.3 overs)
Nicholas Pooran 59 (37); Gudakesh Motie 3/29 (2 overs)		Zachary Carter 21 (20); Sunil Narine 4/12 (3.3 overs)

Trinbago Knight Riders won by 35 runs
Kensington Oval, Barbados
Umpires: Zahid Bassarath (WI) and Chris Wright (WI)
Player of the match: Sunil Narine (Trinbago Knight Riders)

- Barbados Tridents won the toss and elected to field.
- Jakeem Pollard (Barbados Tridents) made his T20 debut.

Match 29
6 September 2026
19:00 (N)
Scorecard

Saint Lucia Kings; 138/6 (20 overs)	v	Barbados Tridents; 139/2 (17.5 overs)
Kamil Pooran 37 (24); Mujeeb Ur Rahman 3/22 (4 overs)		Quinton de Kock 47* (31); Joshua Bishop 1/24 (3 overs)

Barbados Tridents won by 8 wickets
Kensington Oval, Barbados
Umpires: Gregory Brathwaite (WI) and Carl Tuckett (WI)
Player of the match: Mujeeb Ur Rahman (Barbados Tridents)

- Barbados Tridents won the toss and elected to field.

Match 32
10 September 2026
19:00 (N)
Scorecard

St Kitts & Nevis Patriots; 118 (20 overs)	v	Barbados Tridents; 120/6 (18 overs)
Wanindu Hasaranga 45 (25); Chris Green 4/20 (4 overs)		Quinton de Kock 44* (43); Jason Holder 3/31 (4 overs)

Barbados Tridents won by 4 wickets
Kensington Oval, Barbados
Umpires: Zahid Bassarath (WI) and Chris Wright (WI)
Player of the match: Chris Green (Barbados Tridents)

- Barbados Tridents won the toss and elected to field.

Match 34
12 September 2026
20:00 (N)
Scorecard

Jamaica Kingsmen; 150/9 (20 overs)	v	Barbados Tridents; 151/8 (20 overs)
Maaz Sadaqat 47 (34); Jakeem Pollard 3/38 (4 overs)		Shadrack Descarte 56 (42); Hunain Shah 2/25 (4 overs)

Barbados Tridents won by 2 wickets
Kensington Oval, Barbados
Umpires: Gregory Brathwaite (WI) and Carl Tuckett (WI)
Player of the match: Gudakesh Motie (Barbados Tridents)

- Barbados Tridents won the toss and elected to field.

Match 35
13 September 2026
19:00 (N)
Scorecard

Guyana Amazon Warriors; 99 (18.1 overs)	v	Barbados Tridents
Glenn Phillips 24 (23); Johann Layne 3/14 (2 overs)

Kensington Oval, Barbados
Umpires: Zahid Bassarath (WI) and Chris Wright (WI)

- Barbados Tridents won the toss and elected to field.
- Ronaldo Alimohamed (Guyana Amazon Warriors) made his T20 debut.
- Allah Ghazanfar (Barbados Tridents) took his 100th wicket in T20s.
