= 2026 Guyana Amazon Warriors season =

Overview of Guyana Amazon Warriors in 2026 Caribbean Premier League

Guyana Amazon Warriors
2026 season
- Coach: Lance Klusener
- Captain(s): Imran Tahir
- Home ground: Providence Stadium
- League: Caribbean Premier League
- League Stage: 1st

The 2026 Guyana Amazon Warriors season is the fourteenth season of the franchise in the Caribbean Premier League. The team is captained by Imran Tahir.

== Current squads ==
The following players were retained, signed or drafted by their respective teams.

No.	Name	Nationality	Birth date	Batting style	Bowling style	Year signed	Notes
Batsmen
—N/a	Shimron Hetmyer	Guyana	26 December 1996 (age 29)	Left-handed		2016	
—N/a	Glenn Phillips	New Zealand	6 December 1996 (age 29)	Right-handed	Right-arm off-break	2026	Overseas
—N/a	Rahmanullah Gurbaz	Afghanistan	28 November 2001 (age 24)	Right-handed		2026	Overseas
—N/a	Matthew Nandu	Guyana	4 August 2000 (age 26)	Left-handed		2026	
—N/a	Mavendra Dindyal	Guyana		Left-handed		2026	
All-rounders
—N/a	Dwaine Pretorius	South Africa	29 March 1989 (age 37)	Right-handed	Right-arm medium-fast	2023	Overseas
—N/a	Mohammad Nabi	Afghanistan	1 January 1985 (age 41)	Right-handed	Right-arm off-break	2026	Overseas
—N/a	Romario Shepherd	Guyana	26 November 1994 (age 31)	Right-handed	Right-arm fast-medium	2018	
—N/a	Ronaldo Alimohamed	Guyana		Right-handed	Right-arm medium-fast	2026	
—N/a	Jonathan van Lange	Guyana		Right-handed	Right-arm medium	2026	
—N/a	Quentin Sampson	Guyana	4 August 2000 (age 26)	Right-handed	Right-arm medium-fast	2025	
Wicket-keepers
—N/a	Shai Hope	Barbados	10 November 1993 (age 32)	Right-handed		2022	
—N/a	Mohammad Haris	Pakistan	30 March 2001 (age 25)	Right-handed		2026	Overseas
—N/a	Rahmanullah Gurbaz	Afghanistan	28 November 2001 (age 24)	Right-handed		2026	Overseas
Spin bowlers
—N/a	Imran Tahir	South Africa	27 March 1979 (age 47)	Right-handed	Right-arm legbreak	2018	Captain, Overseas
—N/a	Veerasammy Permaul	Guyana	11 July 1989 (age 37)	Left-handed	Slow left-arm orthodox	2026	
—N/a	Khary Pierre	Trinidad and Tobago		Left-handed	Slow left-arm orthodox	2026	
Pace bowlers
—N/a	Shamar Joseph	Guyana	31 August 1999 (age 27)	Left-handed	Right-arm fast	2023	
—N/a	Isai Thorne	Guyana		Right-handed	Right-arm fast	2026	

== Standings ==
=== Points table ===
Pos	Team	Pld	W	L	NR	Pts	NRR	Qualification
1	Guyana Amazon Warriors	10	8	2	0	16	0.615	Advanced to Qualifier 1
2	Antigua & Barbuda Falcons	10	6	3	1	13	0.174	Advanced to Qualifier 1
3	Barbados Tridents	10	6	4	0	12	−0.125	Advanced to Eliminator
4	Jamaica Kingsmen	10	4	6	0	8	−0.085	Advanced to Eliminator
5	Saint Lucia Kings	10	4	6	0	8	−0.887	Eliminated
6	St Kitts & Nevis Patriots	10	3	6	1	7	0.252	Eliminated
7	Trinbago Knight Riders	10	3	7	0	6	−0.010	Eliminated

Updated to match(es) played on 14 September 2026. Source: Cricinfo

=== Match summary ===
Team	League stage											Knockout stage		
Team	1	2	3	4	5	6	7	8	9	10	11	Q/E	C	F
Guyana Amazon Warriors	2	4	6	8	10	12	12	14						

Win	Loss	Tie	No Result

== Fixtures ==
On 28 April 2026, Cricket West Indies confirmed the full schedule for the tournament, which featured 39 matches to be played across eight venues.

=== Phase 2 (Antigua, Jamaica and Saint Lucia) ===
Match 6
13 August 2026
19:00 (N)
Scorecard

Jamaica Kingsmen; 117 (19.4 overs)	v	Guyana Amazon Warriors; 118/4 (14.1 overs)
Reeza Hendricks 40 (32); Mohammad Nabi 4/22 (4 overs)		Shai Hope 56* (41); Andre Russell 2/12 (2 overs)

Guyana Amazon Warriors won by 6 wickets
Sabina Park, Jamaica
Umpires: Zahid Bassarath (WI) and Carl Tuckett (WI)
Player of the match: Mohammad Nabi (Guyana Amazon Warriors)

- Guyana Amazon Warriors won the toss and elected to field.
- Mavendra Dindyal (Guyana Amazon Warriors) made his T20 debut.

Match 11
19 August 2026
19:00 (N)
Scorecard

Saint Lucia Kings; 151/7 (20 overs)	v	Guyana Amazon Warriors; 157/3 (18.1 overs)
Charith Asalanka 35 (28); Dwaine Pretorius 3/29 (4 overs)		Mavendra Dindyal 50 (51); Maheesh Theekshana 2/33 (3.1 overs)

Guyana Amazon Warriors won by 7 wickets
Daren Sammy Cricket Ground, Saint Lucia
Umpires: Ryan Banwarie (WI) and Deighton Butler (WI)
Player of the match: Dwaine Pretorius (Guyana Amazon Warriors)

- Guyana Amazon Warriors won the toss and elected to field.

Match 15
23 August 2026
19:00 (N)
Scorecard

Antigua & Barbuda Falcons; 116 (17 overs)	v	Guyana Amazon Warriors; 121/3 (9.5 overs)
Amir Jangoo 37 (29); Shamar Joseph 3/22 (3 overs)		Shimron Hetmyer 49 (19); Jayden Seales 1/21 (3 overs)

Guyana Amazon Warriors won by 7 wickets
Sir Vivian Richards Stadium, Antigua
Umpires: Zahid Bassarath (WI) and Chris Wright (WI)
Player of the match: Khary Pierre (Guyana Amazon Warriors)

- Guyana Amazon Warriors won the toss and elected to field.

=== Phase 3 (Trinidad and Saint Kitts) ===
Match 22
31 August 2026
17:00 (D/N)
Scorecard

Guyana Amazon Warriors; 185/5 (16 overs)	v	Trinbago Knight Riders; 172/7 (16 overs)
Shimron Hetmyer 111* (43); Akeal Hosein 1/11 (2 overs)		Alex Hales 55 (24); Mohammad Nabi 3/20 (3 overs)

Guyana Amazon Warriors won by 9 runs (DLS method)
Queen's Park Oval, Trinidad
Umpires: Leslie Reifer (WI) and Christopher Taylor (WI)
Player of the match: Shimron Hetmyer (Guyana Amazon Warriors)

- Trinbago Knight Riders won the toss and elected to field.
- The match was reduced to 16 overs per side due to rain.
- Trinbago Knight Riders were set a revised target of 182 runs off 16 overs due to rain.
- Shimron Hetmyer (Guyana Amazon Warriors) scored his 7,000th runs in T20s.

Match 15
23 August 2026
19:00 (N)
Scorecard

Antigua & Barbuda Falcons; 116 (17 overs)	v	Guyana Amazon Warriors; 121/3 (9.5 overs)
Amir Jangoo 37 (29); Shamar Joseph 3/22 (3 overs)		Shimron Hetmyer 49 (19); Jayden Seales 1/21 (3 overs)

Guyana Amazon Warriors won by 7 wickets
Sir Vivian Richards Stadium, Antigua
Umpires: Zahid Bassarath (WI) and Chris Wright (WI)
Player of the match: Khary Pierre (Guyana Amazon Warriors)

- Guyana Amazon Warriors won the toss and elected to field.

=== Phase 4 (Guyana and Barbados) ===
Match 26
4 September 2026
19:00 (N)
Scorecard

Jamaica Kingsmen; 159/7 (20 overs)	v	Guyana Amazon Warriors; 160/2 (17.2 overs)
Hassan Khan 62* (29); Dwaine Pretorius 2/20 (3 overs)		Rahmanullah Gurbaz 54 (35); Maaz Sadaqat 1/6 (1 over)

Guyana Amazon Warriors won by 8 wickets
Providence Stadium, Guyana
Umpires: Ryan Banwarie (WI) and Leslie Reifer (WI)
Player of the match: Dwaine Pretorius (Guyana Amazon Warriors)

- Guyana Amazon Warriors won the toss and elected to field.
- Mohammad Nabi (Guyana Amazon Warriors) played in his 500th match in T20s.
- Rahmanullah Gurbaz (Guyana Amazon Warriors) scored his 7,000th runs in T20s.

Match 28
6 September 2026
15:00
Scorecard

St Kitts & Nevis Patriots; 128 (19.2 overs)	v	Guyana Amazon Warriors; 132/3 (18.3 overs)
Alick Athanaze 52 (39); Mohammad Nabi 4/17 (4 overs)		Rahmanullah Gurbaz 39 (25); Navin Bidaisee 2/20 (4 overs)

Guyana Amazon Warriors won by 7 wickets
Providence Stadium, Guyana
Umpires: Ryan Banwarie (WI) and Deighton Butler (WI)
Player of the match: Mohammad Nabi (Guyana Amazon Warriors)

- St Kitts & Nevis Patriots won the toss and elected to bat.

Match 30
8 September 2026
19:00 (N)
Scorecard

Antigua & Barbuda Falcons; 182/5 (20 overs)	v	Guyana Amazon Warriors; 117 (14.2 overs)
Hassan Nawaz 36 (27); Imran Tahir 1/21 (4 overs)		Mavendra Dindyal 25 (13); Alzarri Joseph 4/41 (4 overs)

Antigua & Barbuda Falcons won by 65 runs
Providence Stadium, Guyana
Umpires: Leslie Reifer (WI) and Christopher Taylor (WI)
Player of the match: Shadab Khan (Antigua & Barbuda Falcons)

- Guyana Amazon Warriors won the toss and elected to field.

Match 31
9 September 2026
19:00 (N)
Scorecard

Saint Lucia Kings; 119 (18.5 overs)	v	Guyana Amazon Warriors; 122/6 (18.3 overs)
Kamil Pooran 43 (35); Imran Tahir 5/17 (4 overs)		Quentin Sampson 37* (11); Roston Chase 3/34 (4 overs)

Guyana Amazon Warriors won by 4 wickets
Providence Stadium, Guyana
Umpires: Deighton Butler (WI) and Christopher Taylor (WI)
Player of the match: Imran Tahir (Guyana Amazon Warriors)

- Saint Lucia Kings won the toss and elected to bat.
- Kemol Savory (Saint Lucia Kings) made his T20 debut.

Match 33
11 September 2026
19:00 (N)
Scorecard

Trinbago Knight Riders; 126/8 (20 overs)	v	Guyana Amazon Warriors; 127/4 (18.4 overs)
Justin Greaves 35 (37); Mehidy Hasan Miraz 4/23 (4 overs)		Shai Hope 42* (35); Sunil Narine 1/13 (4 overs)

Guyana Amazon Warriors won by 6 wickets
Providence Stadium, Guyana
Umpires: Ryan Banwarie (WI) and Leslie Reifer (WI)
Player of the match: Mehidy Hasan Miraz (Guyana Amazon Warriors)

- Guyana Amazon Warriors won the toss and elected to field.
- Sunil Narine (Trinbago Knight Riders) scored his 5,000th runs in T20s.
- Shai Hope (Guyana Amazon Warriors) scored his 6,000th runs in T20s.
- This was the 100th win for the Guyana Amazon Warriors in CPL.

Match 35
13 September 2026
19:00 (N)
Scorecard

Guyana Amazon Warriors; 99 (18.1 overs)	v	Barbados Tridents
Glenn Phillips 24 (23); Johann Layne 3/14 (2 overs)

Kensington Oval, Barbados
Umpires: Zahid Bassarath (WI) and Chris Wright (WI)

- Barbados Tridents won the toss and elected to field.
- Ronaldo Alimohamed (Guyana Amazon Warriors) made his T20 debut.
- Allah Ghazanfar (Barbados Tridents) took his 100th wicket in T20s.
