= 2026 Trinbago Knight Riders season =

Overview of Trinbago Knight Riders in 2026 Caribbean Premier League

Trinbago Knight Riders
2026 season
- Coach: Dwayne Bravo
- Captain(s): Nicholas Pooran
- Home ground: Queen's Park Oval
- League: Caribbean Premier League

The 2026 Trinbago Knight Riders season is the fourteenth season of the franchise in the Caribbean Premier League. The team is captained by Nicholas Pooran.

== Current squads ==
The following players were retained, signed or drafted by their respective teams.

== Standings ==
=== Points table ===
Pos	Team	Pld	W	L	NR	Pts	NRR	Qualification
1	Antigua & Barbuda Falcons (Q)	10	6	3	1	13	−0.267	Advanced to Qualifier 1
2	Guyana Amazon Warriors	7	6	1	0	12	1.977	Advanced to Qualifier 1
3	Jamaica Kingsmen	9	4	5	0	8	0.052	Advanced to Eliminator
4	Saint Lucia Kings	9	4	5	0	8	−0.888	Advanced to Eliminator
5	St Kitts & Nevis Patriots	9	3	5	1	7	0.405	
6	Trinbago Knight Riders	9	3	6	0	6	−0.167	
7	Barbados Tridents	7	3	4	0	6	−0.784	

Updated to match(es) played on 9 September 2026. Source: Cricinfo
(Q) Qualified for the phase indicated

=== Match summary ===
Team	League stage										Knockout stage		
Team	1	2	3	4	5	6	7	8	9	10	Q/E	C	F
Trinbago Knight Riders	2	2	2	2	4	4	4	4	6				

Win	Loss	Tie	No Result

== Fixtures ==
On 28 April 2026, Cricket West Indies confirmed the full schedule for the tournament, which featured 39 matches to be played across eight venues.

=== Phase 1 (Saint Vincent) ===
Match 2
8 August 2026
19:00 (N)
Scorecard

St Kitts & Nevis Patriots; 109/9 (20 overs)	v	Trinbago Knight Riders; 94/2 (15 overs)
Kevin Wickham 38 (44); Sunil Narine 3/7 (4)		Matthew Breetzke 35* (35); Jason Holder 1/13 (3 overs)

Trinbago Knight Riders won by 19 runs (DLS method)
Arnos Vale Stadium, Saint Vincent
Umpires: Ryan Banwarie (WI) and Leslie Reifer (WI)
Player of the match: Sunil Narine (Trinbago Knight Riders)

- Trinbago Knight Riders won the toss and elected to field.
- No further play was possible due to rain.
- Trinbago Knight Riders were 19 runs ahead of DLS par score of 76 runs from 15 overs.
- Dexter Sween (Trinbago Knight Riders) made his T20 debut.

=== Phase 2 (Antigua, Jamaica and Saint Lucia) ===
Match 8
15 August 2026
19:00 (N)
Scorecard

Trinbago Knight Riders; 182/6 (20 overs)	v	Jamaica Kingsmen; 183/5 (18.4 overs)
Kieron Pollard 44 (22); Hunain Shah 2/31 (4 overs)		Kirk McKenzie 69 (25); Usman Tariq 3/21 (4 overs)

Jamaica Kingsmen won by 5 wickets
Sabina Park, Jamaica
Umpires: Zahid Bassarath (WI) and Chris Wright (WI)
Player of the match: Kirk McKenzie (Jamaica Kingsmen)

- Jamaica Kingsmen won the toss and elected to field.

Match 14
22 August 2026
19:00 (N)
Scorecard

Trinbago Knight Riders; 165/6 (20 overs)	v	Antigua & Barbuda Falcons; 168/5 (18.3 overs)
Colin Munro 46 (33); Rahkeem Cornwall 2/17 (2 overs)		Shadab Khan 52* (20); Terrance Hinds 2/36 (2.3 overs)

Antigua & Barbuda Falcons won by 5 wickets
Sir Vivian Richards Stadium, Antigua
Umpires: Zahid Bassarath (WI) and Carl Tuckett (WI)
Player of the match: Shadab Khan (Antigua & Barbuda Falcons)

- Antigua & Barbuda Falcons won the toss and elected to field.

=== Phase 3 (Trinidad and Saint Kitts) ===
Match 17
26 August 2026
19:00 (N)
Scorecard

Saint Lucia Kings; 211/4 (20 overs)	v	Trinbago Knight Riders; 175/6 (20 overs)
Tim Seifert 105* (61); Kieron Pollard 1/24 (3 overs)		Kieron Pollard 65 (26); Roston Chase 3/24 (4 overs)

Saint Lucia Kings won by 36 runs
Queen's Park Oval, Trinidad
Umpires: Deighton Butler (WI) and Christopher Taylor (WI)
Player of the match: Tim Seifert (Saint Lucia Kings)

- Trinbago Knight Riders won the toss and elected to field.
- Abdul-Raheem Toppin (Trinbago Knight Riders) made his T20 debut.

Match 19
28 August 2026
20:00 (N)
Scorecard

Barbados Tridents; 127/9 (20 overs)	v	Trinbago Knight Riders; 128/3 (14.5 overs)
Zachary Carter 28 (27); Sunil Narine 2/14 (4 overs)		Sunil Narine 55 (33); Ramon Simmonds 1/20 (2.5 overs)

Trinbago Knight Riders won by 7 wickets
Queen's Park Oval, Trinidad
Umpires: Ryan Banwarie (WI) and Leslie Reifer (WI)
Player of the match: Sunil Narine (Trinbago Knight Riders)

- Trinbago Knight Riders won the toss and elected to field.

Match 20
29 August 2026
19:00 (N)
Scorecard

Trinbago Knight Riders; 180/6 (20 overs)	v	Jamaica Kingsmen; 127/3 (14.4 overs)
Nicholas Pooran 60* (37); Vitel Lawes 3/29 (4 overs)		Keacy Carty 42 (33); Jyd Goolie 2/30 (4 overs)

Jamaica Kingsmen won by 7 runs (DLS method)
Queen's Park Oval, Trinidad
Umpires: Ryan Banwarie (WI) and Deighton Butler (WI)
Player of the match: Vitel Lawes (Jamaica Kingsmen)

- Jamaica Kingsmen won the toss and elected to field.
- Jamaica Kingsmen were 7 runs ahead of DLS par score of 120 runs from 14.4 overs.
- Rain prevented any further play.

Match 22
31 August 2026
17:00 (D/N)
Scorecard

Guyana Amazon Warriors; 185/5 (16 overs)	v	Trinbago Knight Riders; 172/7 (16 overs)
Shimron Hetmyer 111* (43); Akeal Hosein 1/11 (2 overs)		Alex Hales 55 (24); Mohammad Nabi 3/20 (3 overs)

Guyana Amazon Warriors won by 9 runs (DLS method)
Queen's Park Oval, Trinidad
Umpires: Leslie Reifer (WI) and Christopher Taylor (WI)
Player of the match: Shimron Hetmyer (Guyana Amazon Warriors)

- Trinbago Knight Riders won the toss and elected to field.
- The match was reduced to 16 overs per side due to rain.
- Trinbago Knight Riders were set a revised target of 182 runs off 16 overs due to rain.
- Shimron Hetmyer (Guyana Amazon Warriors) scored his 7,000th runs in T20s.

Match 24
2 September 2026
19:00 (N)
Scorecard

Antigua & Barbuda Falcons; 183/4 (20 overs)	v	Trinbago Knight Riders; 175/7 (20 overs)
Hassan Nawaz 76 (48); Usman Tariq 1/25 (4 overs)		Joshua Da Silva 54* (31); Rahkeem Cornwall 3/17 (3 overs)

Antigua & Barbuda Falcons won by 8 runs
Queen's Park Oval, Trinidad
Umpires: Deighton Butler (WI) and Christopher Taylor (WI)
Player of the match: Rahkeem Cornwall (Antigua & Barbuda Falcons)

- Trinbago Knight Riders won the toss and elected to field.

=== Phase 4 (Guyana and Barbados) ===
Match 27
5 September 2026
20:00 (N)
Scorecard

Trinbago Knight Riders; 147/6 (20 overs)	v	Barbados Tridents; 112 (18.3 overs)
Nicholas Pooran 59 (37); Gudakesh Motie 3/29 (2 overs)		Zachary Carter 21 (20); Sunil Narine 4/12 (3.3 overs)

Trinbago Knight Riders won by 35 runs
Kensington Oval, Barbados
Umpires: Zahid Bassarath (WI) and Chris Wright (WI)
Player of the match: Sunil Narine (Trinbago Knight Riders)

- Barbados Tridents won the toss and elected to field.
- Jakeem Pollard (Barbados Tridents) made his T20 debut.

Match 33
11 September 2026
19:00 (N)
Scorecard

Guyana Amazon Warriors	v	Trinbago Knight Riders

Providence Stadium, Guyana
