= Kirk McKenzie =

Jamaican cricketer (born 2000)

Personal information
- Full name: Kirk Sanjay Alexander McKenzie
- Born: 9 November 2000 (age 26); Jamaica
- Batting: Left-handed
- Bowling: Right-arm off break
- Role: Top-order batter

International information
- National side: West Indies (2023–2024)
- Test debut (cap 334): 20 July 2023 v India
- Last Test: 26 July 2024 v England

Domestic team information
- Years: Team
- 2021: Jamaica Tallawahs (squad no. 54)
- 2022–present: Jamaica (squad no. 54)

Career statistics
Competition	Test	FC	LA	T20
Matches	7	31	17	14
Runs scored	203	1,595	396	154
Batting average	16.91	27.50	24.75	11.84
100s/50s	0/1	2/7	0/3	0/0
Top score	50	221	90	28
Balls bowled	0	132	24	0
Wickets	0	3	2	0
Bowling average	–	37.33	10.00	–
5 wickets in innings	0	0	0	0
10 wickets in match	0	0	0	0
Best bowling	–	1/8	2/20	–
Catches/stumpings	4/–	20/–	7/–	3/–
- Source: Cricinfo, 21 July 2024

Kirk McKenzie (born 9 November 2000) is a Jamaican cricketer. In August 2021, he was named in the Jamaica Tallawahs' squad for the 2021 Caribbean Premier League. He made his Twenty20 debut on 5 September 2021, for the Jamaica Tallawahs in the 2021 Caribbean Premier League. Prior to his Twenty20 debut, he was part of the West Indies' squad for the 2020 Under-19 Cricket World Cup.

== Career ==
He made his first-class debut on 1 June 2022, for Jamaica in the 2021–22 West Indies Championship.

In July 2023, McKenzie was named in a West Indies squad for the first time, being called up for the side's Test match against India. In December 2023, McKenzie was again selected in the Test squad for the side's tour of Australia in January 2024. In the first innings of the first test, he scored 50 runs against Australia. In the second innings he scored 26 runs off 35 balls.

On 15 August 2026, McKenzie hit his maiden T20 half century during the CPL, off 19 Balls batting for the Jamaica Kingsmen against the Trinbago Knight Riders.
