= Glenn Phillips =

Glenn or Glen Phillips may refer to:

- Glenn Phillips (guitarist), guitarist and composer
- Glen Phillips (singer) (born 1970), singer and songwriter of Toad the Wet Sprocket
- Glen Phillips (speedway rider) (born 1982), British speedway rider
- Glenn Phillips (cricketer) (born 1996), New Zealand cricketer
