= Zachary Carter (cricketer) =

West Indian cricketer (born 2006)

Personal information
- Full name: Zachary Nathan Carter
- Born: 19 December 2006 (age 19)
- Batting: Left-handed
- Bowling: Slow left-arm orthodox
- Role: Top-order batter

Domestic team information
- Years: Team
- 2026–: Desert Vipers
- 2026–: Barbados Tridents

Career statistics
Competition	T20
Matches	15
Runs scored	287
Batting average	19.13
100s/50s	0/2
Top score	57
Balls bowled	25
Wickets	1
Bowling average	34.00
5 wickets in innings	0
10 wickets in match	0
Best bowling	1/9
Catches/stumpings	3/–
- Source: Cricinfo, 17 September 2026

Zachary Nathan Carter (born 19 December 2006) is a Barbadian cricketer.

== Career ==
Carter attended school at St. Leonard's Boys' School in Barbados, and was a graduate of the Sir Everton Weekes Centre of Excellence. He played under 17s and under 19s cricket for Barbados.

Carter represented West Indies under 19s against England in England's tour of the West Indies in 2025. In the fifth game of the series, Carter scored 87 runs opening the batting.

Carter was part of the West Indies squad for the 2026 Under-19 Men's Cricket World Cup. In a game against South Africa, Carter hit a century, finishing with 114 runs off 104 balls. Two games later against Australia, Carter had another strong display with 64 runs off just 42 balls, top scoring for the West Indies.

In 2026, Carter joined the Desert Vipers in the Global Super League. In the 7th match of the 2026 Global Super League, against the San Francisco Unicorns, Carter recorded 55 runs from 29 balls, and was the highest scorer of the match.

Ahead of the 2026 Caribbean Premier League, Carter joined the Barbados Tridents squad.
