= Navin Bidaisee =

West Indian cricketer

Personal information
- Born: 24 March 2000 (age 26)
- Batting: Left-handed
- Bowling: Legbreak
- Role: Batting Allrounder

International information
- National side: West Indies (2025–present)
- T20I debut (cap 105): 27 September 2025 v Nepal
- Last T20I: 30 September 2025 v Nepal

Domestic team information
- Years: Team
- 2022/23: Combined Campuses and Colleges
- 2024–present: Trinidad and Tobago
- 2025: St Kitts and Nevis Patriots
- 2025/26: Dubai Capitals

Career statistics
Competition	T20I	FC	LA	T20
Matches	3	1	8	11
Runs scored	24	31	94	148
Batting average	12.00	31.00	15.66	21.14
100s/50s	0/0	0/0	0/0	0/1
Top score	22	31	30	50
Balls bowled	48	36	186	186
Wickets	3	2	4	10
Bowling average	20.66	10.00	41.50	25.20
5 wickets in innings	0	0	0	0
10 wickets in match	–	0	–	–
Best bowling	3/29	2/20	3/40	3/29
Catches/stumpings	2/–	1/–	2/–	4/–
- Source: Cricinfo, 3 October 2025

Navin Bidaisee (born 24 March 2000) is a Trinidadian cricketer who currently plays for the St Kitts and Nevis Patriots in the Caribbean Premier League.

== Career ==
In November 2022, he made his List A debut playing for the Combined Campuses and Colleges against the Guyana in the 2022–23 Super50 Cup. In April 2024, he made his first class debut for the Trinidad and Tobago against Jamaica in the 2023–24 West Indies Championship. In August 2025, he made his Twenty20 debut for the St Kitts and Nevis Patriots against Saint Lucia Kings in the 2025 Caribbean Premier League.

In September 2025, Bidaisee was named in West Indies T20I squad for their series against Nepal in the UAE. He made his T20I debut on 27 September 2025.
