= Amir Jangoo =

Trinidadian cricketer (born 1997)

Personal information
- Full name: Amir Anthony Jangoo
- Born: 14 July 1997 (age 29); St. James, Trinidad
- Batting: Left-handed
- Role: Wicket-keeper-batter

International information
- National side: West Indies (2024–present)
- Test debut (cap 342): 25 January 2025 v Pakistan
- Last Test: 2 August 2026 v Pakistan
- ODI debut (cap 227): 12 December 2024 v Bangladesh
- Last ODI: 3 October 2026 v India
- T20I debut (cap 106): 27 September 2025 v Nepal
- Last T20I: 19 January 2026 v Afghanistan

Domestic team information
- Years: Team
- 2016–2019, 2023–present: Trinidad and Tobago
- 2017–2018: Combined Campuses and Colleges
- 2019–2022: Leeward Islands
- 2020: Trinbago Knight Riders
- 2022–2023: Jamaica Tallawahs
- 2025: Antigua and Barbuda Falcons

Career statistics
Competition	Test	ODI	T20I	FC
Matches	5	12	7	51
Runs scored	336	467	163	2,967
Batting average	42.00	58.37	32.60	37.08
100s/50s	1/0	2/3	0/1	3/17
Top score	233	114	74*	233
Catches/stumpings	2/0	2/0	3/1	52/1
- Source: Cricinfo, 21 October 2026

Amir Anthony Jangoo (born 14 July 1997) is a Trinidadian cricket left-handed batter and wicket-keeper who plays for the West Indies and Trinidad and Tobago, as well as Antigua and Barbuda Falcons in the Caribbean Premier League. He made his senior international debut for the West Indies in 2024.

== Career ==
Jangoo made his competitive debut in a List A match for the West Indies Under-19s in January 2015 at the Regional Super50. His first-class debut for Trinidad and Tobago was in April 2017 at the Regional Four Day Competition. In July 2020, he was named in the Trinbago Knight Riders squad for the 2020 Caribbean Premier League. He made his Twenty20 debut on 2 September 2020, for the Trinbago Knight Riders in the 2020 CPL.

In December 2024, he was named first time in West Indies ODI squad against Bangladesh. He made his One Day International (ODI) debut on 12 December 2024, against Bangladesh in 3rd ODI of the same series. He scored an unbeaten century (104) on his international debut and he became the second West Indian player to score a century on ODI debut.

During the first test against Sri Lanka in June 2026, Jangoo hit his maiden test century, off 226 balls. He converted this hundred into a maiden double hundred, during a marathon 401 run stand for the 6th wicket with captain Roston Chase, the largest stand for the sixth wicket in Test cricket history. He was eventually dismissed for 233.

During the 2nd ODI against India on 30 September, 2026, Jangoo hit a 70 ball century, and eventually scored a career high 114 runs off 77 balls, as West Indies put on a team record 405 in the first innings.
