= Amari Goodridge =

West Indian cricketer

Personal information
- Full name: Amari Alexandre Goodridge
- Born: 10 November 2001 (age 24); Bridgetown, Barbados
- Batting: Right-handed
- Bowling: Right-arm medium
- Role: Bowler

Domestic team information
- Years: Team
- 2022–present: Combined Campuses and Colleges
- Source: ESPNCricinfo, 7 March 2025

Amari Alexandre Goodridge (born 10 November 2001) is a West Indian cricketer who currently plays for the Combined Campuses and Colleges cricket team in West Indian domestic cricket as a bowler.

== Career ==
In October 2022, he made his List A debut against Trinidad and Tobago in the 2022–23 Super50 Cup. In March 2024, he made his first class against the Leeward Islands in the 2022–23 West Indies Championship.
