= Usman Tariq =

Pakistani cricketer (born 1995)

Personal information
- Born: 7 June 1995 (age 31); Nowshera, Khyber Pakhtunkhwa, Pakistan
- Height: 193 cm (6 ft 4 in)
- Batting: Right-handed
- Bowling: Right-arm off spin
- Role: Bowler

International information
- National side: Pakistan (2025–present)
- T20I debut (cap 124): 1 November 2025 v South Africa
- Last T20I: 28 February 2026 v Sri Lanka
- T20I shirt no.: 76

Domestic team information
- Years: Team
- 2024–present: Quetta Gladiators
- 2024: Deccan Gladiators
- 2025–present: Trinbago Knight Riders
- 2025/26: Desert Vipers
- 2026: Warwickshire
- 2026: Birmingham Phoenix

Career statistics
Competition	T20I	FC	LA	T20
Matches	9	2	3	87
Runs scored	0	16	1	46
Batting average	0.00	16.00	1.00	5.11
100s/50s	0/0	0/0	0/0	0/0
Top score	0	13*	1*	7*
Balls bowled	181	324	168	1,958
Wickets	18	8	8	121
Bowling average	11.16	26.25	19.37	18.30
5 wickets in innings	0	1	0	0
10 wickets in match	0	0	–	0
Best bowling	4/16	5/62	4/26	4/16
Catches/stumpings	1/–	0/–	0/–	14/–
- Source: ESPNcricinfo, 17 October 2026

Usman Tariq (born 7 June 1995) is a Pakistani international cricketer, who bowls as a right-arm off spinner. He made his T20I debut against South Africa at Lahore in November 2025.

== Early life ==
Usman Tariq was born on 7 June 1995 in Nowshera, Khyber Pakhtunkhwa, Pakistan. He later moved to the United Arab Emirates, where he worked as a salesman for a purchasing company, after quitting cricket. He returned to the sport after watching the MS Dhoni biopic, M.S. Dhoni: The Untold Story (2016).

After leaving Dubai, a friend introduced him to Pakistan opener Fakhar Zaman, who took him to a local coach in Khyber Pakhtunkhwa and later to former Pakistan cricketer Wajahatullah Wasti for further coaching.

== Domestic and franchise career ==
In December 2023, Tariq was picked by Quetta Gladiators following the players' draft to play for them in the 2024 Pakistan Super League.

In September 2025, Tariq played for Trinbago Knight Riders in the 2025 Caribbean Premier League. He helped his side to the title and ranked second on the wicket charts with 20 dismissals, trailing Imran Tahir (23) despite playing 10 matches to Tahir’s 12.

== International career ==
In October 2025, Tariq made his debut for Pakistan in the third T20I of the home series against South Africa. He ended with 2/26 in 4 overs, including the wicket of Dewald Brevis, who had looked dangerous, in his first over.

In November 2025, in the fourth match of the Pakistan T20I Tri-Series, Pakistan defeated Zimbabwe to secure a place in the final. Tariq claimed a hat-trick and finished with a match-winning spell of 4/18 that dismantled Zimbabwe’s top order. He was declared Player of the Match.

In February 2026, in the match against India during the T20 World Cup, the decisive moment came in the 18.5 over when Tariq, bowling the final ball of his spell, dismissed Suryakumar Yadav. Attempting an aggressive shot over mid-wicket, Yadav mistimed the delivery on the slow surface and was caught by Saim Ayub at deep mid-wicket. He scored 32 off 29 balls, including three boundaries. Tariq finished with figures of 4–0–24–1, maintaining an economy rate of 6.00.

== Bowling style ==
Tariq is an off-spinner who is known for a pause in his run-up and a carrom ball variation.

=== Bowling action controversy ===
Tariq was reported for a suspect bowling action in both PSL 2024 and 2025. Tariq said his baseball-style action results from a natural anatomical condition that causes a pronounced bend in his arm, he is described as having been being born with an elbow joint that is split, like an arm with two elbows sitting side by side, and that medical testing cleared him. In May 2025, he passed a Pakistan Cricket Board (PCB) biomechanics lab assessment in Lahore and was cleared to bowl. Still, Tom Banton questioned his action during the 2025 ILT20. In 2026, Australia all-rounder Cameron Green mimicked Tariq's round-arm action during a T20 series in Lahore after getting out. In 2026, Indian cricketer Ravichandran Ashwin and umpire Anil Chaudhary stated that Tariq's bowling action was within the rules.
