= Shamar Springer =

Barbadian cricketer

Personal information
- Full name: Shamar Kamal Springer
- Born: 26 November 1997 (age 28); Saint Michael, Barbados
- Batting: Right-handed
- Bowling: Right-arm medium fast
- Role: All-rounder

International information
- National side: West Indies
- ODI debut (cap 229): 16 November 2025 v New Zealand
- Last ODI: 22 November 2025 v New Zealand
- T20I debut (cap 97): 13 October 2024 v Sri Lanka
- Last T20I: 15 October 2024 v Sri Lanka

Domestic team information
- Years: Team
- 2016-2024: Barbados (squad no. 52)
- 2016-2018: Barbados Tridents
- 2017: Jamaica Tallawahs
- 2022-2023: Jamaica Tallawahs
- 2024-present: Windward Islands
- 2024-2025: Antigua and Barbuda Falcons

Career statistics
Competition	T20I	FC	LA	T20
Matches	2	19	46	32
Runs scored	7	792	710	234
Batting average	7.00	29.33	21.51	14.62
100s/50s	0/0	0/5	0/2	0/0
Top score	7	91	58	38
Balls bowled	24	2294	1455	445
Wickets	2	51	43	30
Bowling average	24.50	25.94	21.51	22.76
5 wickets in innings	0	0	1	0
10 wickets in match	0	0	0	0
Best bowling	1/24	4/24	5/30	4/29
Catches/stumpings	0/–	16/–	21/–	10/–
- Source: Cricinfo, 13 April 2025

Shamar Kamal Springer (born 26 November 1997) is a Barbadian cricketer. He made his List A debut on 16 January 2015 in the 2014–15 Regional Super50 tournament. In December 2015 he was named in the West Indies' squad for the 2016 Under-19 Cricket World Cup.

He made his first-class debut for Barbados in the 2017–18 Regional Four Day Competition on 14 December 2017.

In June 2018, he was named in the Cricket West Indies B Team squad for the inaugural edition of the Global T20 Canada tournament.

He was the leading wicket-taker for Barbados in the 2018–19 Regional Super50 tournament, with sixteen dismissals in eight matches. In October 2019, he was selected to play for Barbados in the 2019–20 Regional Super50 tournament. In June 2020, he was selected by Barbados, in the players' draft hosted by Cricket West Indies ahead of the 2020–21 domestic season.

On 22 January 2026, he took a hattrick against Afghanistan to become the third West Indies player with a T20I hattrick after Jason Holder and Romario Shepherd, and the second Barbadian to claim a t20I hat trick after Jason Holder.
