= Matthew Forde =

Barbadian cricketer

Personal information
- Full name: Matthew Walter Forde
- Born: 29 April 2002 (age 24); Barbados
- Batting: Right-handed
- Bowling: Right-arm medium
- Role: Bowler

International information
- National side: West Indies (2023–present)
- ODI debut (cap 221): 9 December 2023 v England
- Last ODI: 22 November 2025 v New Zealand
- ODI shirt no.: 5
- T20I debut (cap 94): 19 December 2023 v England
- Last T20I: 13 November 2025 v New Zealand
- T20I shirt no.: 5

Domestic team information
- Years: Team
- 2022–present: St Lucia Kings
- 2022: Dambulla Aura
- 2024: Comilla Victorians
- 2024: Islamabad United
- 2025: Washington Freedom
- 2025: Gulf Giants
- 2025–present: Barbados

Career statistics
Competition	ODI	T20I	FC	LA
Matches	16	13	7	28
Runs scored	193	84	396	369
Batting average	19.30	14.00	39.60	19.42
100s/50s	0/1	0/0	1/2	0/2
Top score	58	29*	120	58
Balls bowled	693	237	863	1172
Wickets	22	12	17	34
Bowling average	31.54	28.50	22.41	30.73
5 wickets in innings	0	0	1	0
10 wickets in match	–	–	0	–
Best bowling	3/29	3/27	5/69	3/29
Catches/stumpings	6/–	12/–	6/–	14/–
- Source: ESPNcricinfo, 17 December 2025

Matthew Walter Forde (born 29 April 2002) is a Barbadian cricketer. He plays for St Lucia Kings in the Caribbean Premier League and for Dambulla Aura in the Lanka Premier League.

== Career ==
Forde made his T20 debut on 1 September 2022 for St Lucia Kings against Trinbago Knight Riders in the 2022 Caribbean Premier League. He made his List A debut on 31 October 2022 for Combined Campuses and Colleges against Trinidad and Tobago.

Forde was signed by Dambulla Aura for the 2022 Lanka Premier League. On 19 December 2022, he scored his first fifty in his T20 career during 2022 LPL season in a do-or-die contest for Dambulla Aura who were in brink of elimination. He produced an all-round performance both with the bat and ball against Galle Gladiators with a spell of 4/11 in 4 overs coupled with a 30 ball 52 which helped Dambulla Aura to win comfortably against Galle Gladiators. Despite his valiant efforts, Dambulla missed out on playoff qualification after failing to chase 130 runs within 11 overs.

On 9 December 2023, Forde made his one-day international debut for West Indies against England at Bridgetown, Barbados. He picked up 3 wickets for 29 runs off his 8 overs, scored 13 not out in a match-winning partnership with Romario Shepherd, and won the Player Of The Match award. against Ireland he scored a fifty off 16 balls equalling the record set by AB De Villiers of South Africa he went on to score 58 off 19 balls.
