= Antigua & Barbuda Falcons =

Antigua based franchise cricket team in the Caribbean Premier League

- Official logo of the Antigua & Barbuda Falcons

Personnel
- Captain: Moeen Ali
- Coach: Paul Nixon
- Overseas player(s): Moeen Ali; Kusal Perera; Milind Kumar; Tajinder Singh; Shadab Khan; Sufiyan Muqeem
- Owner: Worldwide Sports Management Group

Team information
- Colours: Black; Red; Blue; Yellow; White
- Founded: 2024; 2 years ago
- Home ground: Sir Vivian Richards Stadium
- Capacity: 10,000

History
- CPL wins: 1
- Official website: antiguabarbudafalcons.com
T20I kit

Antigua & Barbuda Falcons are a Caribbean Premier League (CPL) franchise based in Antigua and Barbuda, that replaced the Jamaica Tallawahs from the 2024 Caribbean Premier League season. The team was owned by Worldwide Sports Management Group and was sold to SAMAA in July 2026.

The team was unveiled at Sir Vivian Richards Stadium in Sugar Factory, Saint George on 20 February 2024, where they play their home matches.

The Falcons are owned by an equity firm SAMAA. In 2024, they were coached by cricket legend Shivnarine Chanderpaul, but are now coached by Paul Nixon.

Falcons won their maiden CPL title in just their third season, by defeating the Jamaica Kingsmen by 8 wickets in the 2026 final.

== Current squad ==
- Players with international caps are listed in **bold**.

As of 14 August 2025

No.	Name	Nationality	Birth date	Batting style	Bowling style	Year signed	Notes
Batsmen
—N/a	**Justin Greaves**	Barbados	26 February 1994 (age 32)	Right-handed	Right-arm medium	2025	
—N/a	**Bevon Jacobs**	New Zealand	6 May 2002 (age 24)	Right-handed	Right-arm medium	2025	Overseas
—N/a	**Amir Jangoo**	Trinidad and Tobago	14 July 1997 (age 29)	Left-handed		2025	
—N/a	Kevin Wickham	Barbados	19 March 2003 (age 23)	Right-handed	Right-arm off-break	2025	
All-rounders
—N/a	**Shakib Al Hasan**	Bangladesh	24 March 1987 (age 39)	Left-handed	Left-arm orthodox	2025	Overseas
—N/a	**Fabian Allen**	Jamaica	7 May 1995 (age 31)	Right-handed	Left-arm orthodox	2024	
—N/a	**Rahkeem Cornwall**	Antigua and Barbuda	1 February 1993 (age 33)	Right-handed	Right-arm off-break	2025	
—N/a	**Odean Smith**	Jamaica	1 November 1996 (age 29)	Right-handed	Right-arm fast-medium	2025	
—N/a	**Shamar Springer**	Barbados	26 November 1997 (age 28)	Right-handed	Right-arm medium-fast	2024	
—N/a	**Imad Wasim**	Pakistan	18 December 1988 (age 37)	Left-handed	Left-arm orthodox	2024	Overseas
Wicket-keepers
—N/a	**Jewel Andrew**	Antigua and Barbuda	7 December 2006 (age 19)	Right-handed		2024	
Bowlers
—N/a	**Allah Ghazanfar**	Afghanistan	20 March 2006 (age 20)	Right-handed	Right-arm off spin	2025	Overseas
—N/a	**Karima Gore**	West Indies	25 June 1998 (age 28)	Right-handed	Left-arm orthodox	2025	
—N/a	Joshua James	Trinidad and Tobago	21 February 2001 (age 25)	Right-handed	Right-arm medium	2024	
—N/a	**Obed McCoy**	Saint Vincent and the Grenadines	4 January 1997 (age 29)	Left-handed	Left-arm fast-medium	2025	
—N/a	**Naveen-ul-Haq**	Afghanistan	23 September 1999 (age 26)	Right-handed	Right-arm fast-medium	2025	Overseas
—N/a	**Jayden Seales**	Trinidad and Tobago	10 September 2001 (age 25)	Left-handed	Right-arm fast-medium	2025	

- Source: official site

== Administration and support staff ==
Antigua & Barbuda Falcons
Position	Name
Head coach	Shivnarine Chanderpaul
CEO	Jefferson Miller
Assistant coach	
Team manager	

== Seasons ==
Year	League standing	Final standing
2024	5th out of 6	League Stage
2025	4th out of 6	Eliminator
2026	2nd out of 7	Champion

== Home ground ==
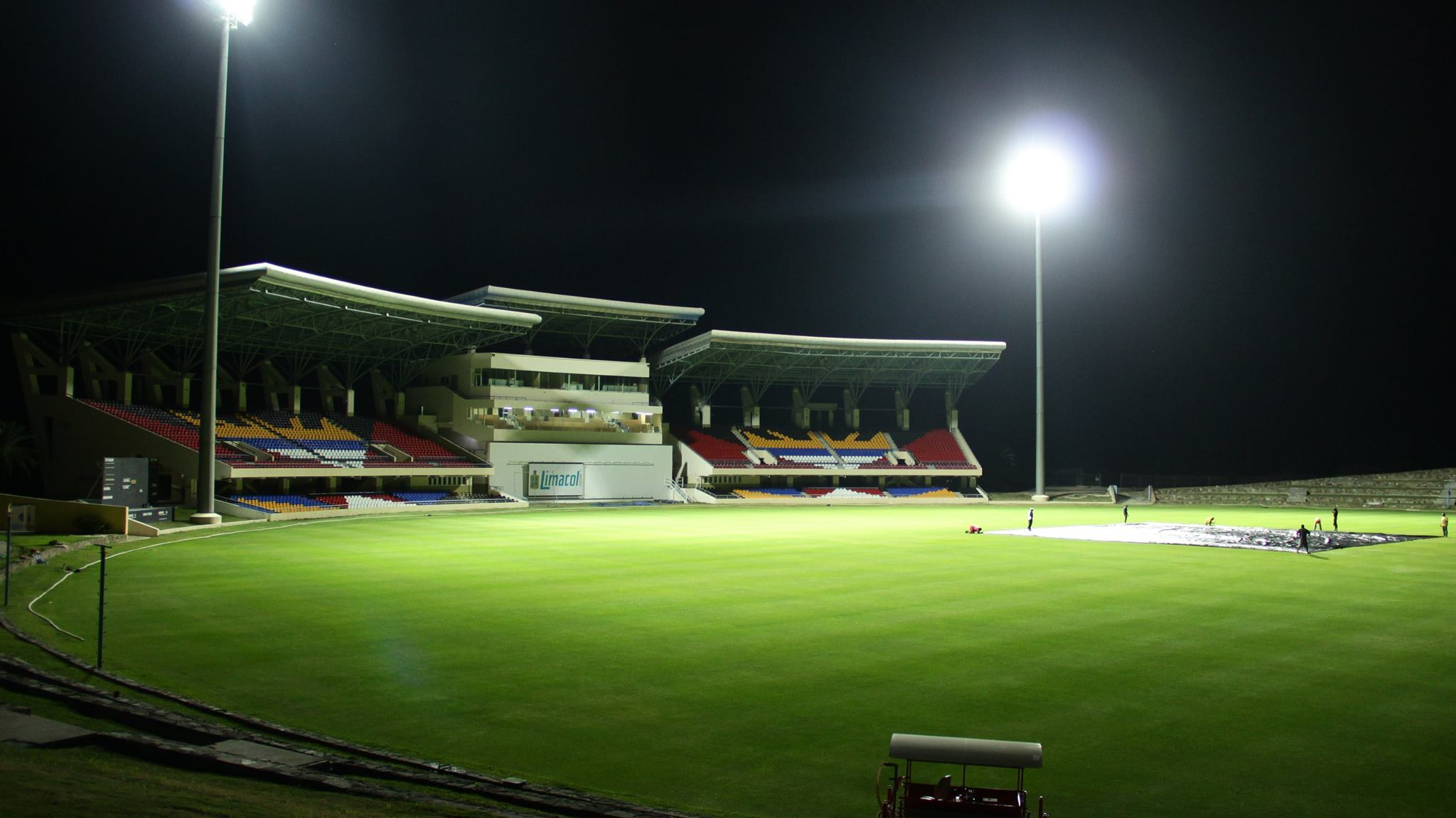
QPO – Flood lights turned on

The Antigua & Barbuda Falcons plays their home games at the Sir Vivian Richards Stadium in Saint George, Antigua and Barbuda. The Sir Vivian Richards Stadium is one of the oldest and most historic of grounds in the Caribbean as well as having one of the largest capacities, accommodating approximately 10,000 spectators in comfort.
