= Kamil Pooran =

Trinidadian cricketer

Personal information
- Born: 13 June 1996 (age 30); Trinidad
- Batting: Right-handed
- Bowling: Right arm medium
- Role: Top order batsman

Domestic team information
- Years: Team
- 2023–present: Trinidad and Tobago
- 2024: Combined Campuses and Colleges
- 2026–present: Saint Lucia Kings

Career statistics
Competition	FC	LA
Matches	4	4
Runs scored	211	58
Batting average	26.37	14.50
100s/50s	0/1	0/0
Top score	88	20
Balls bowled	—	12
Wickets	–	–
Bowling average	—	—
5 wickets in innings	–	–
10 wickets in match	–	—
Best bowling	—	—
Catches/stumpings	4/–	1/–
- Source: ESPNcricinfo, 22 August 2026

Kamil Pooran (born 13 June 1996) is a Trinidadian cricketer who currently plays for the Combined Campuses and Colleges cricket team as a top order batsman. In March 2023, he made his first-class debut playing for Trinidad and Tobago against Jamaica in the 2022–23 West Indies Championship. In October 2024, he made his List A debut playing for the Combined Campuses and Colleges against Trinidad and Tobago in the 2024–25 Super50 Cup.
