= Gregory Brathwaite =

Cricket umpire

Personal information
- Full name: Gregory O'Brian Brathwaite
- Born: 9 December 1969 (age 56); St. Philip, Barbados
- Role: Umpire

Umpiring information
- Tests umpired: 8 (2021–2022)
- ODIs umpired: 59 (2011–2024)
- T20Is umpired: 63 (2012–2025)
- WODIs umpired: 26 (2012–2025)
- WT20Is umpired: 13 (2012–2020)
- Source: Cricinfo, 24 June 2023

Gregory O'Brian Brathwaite (born 9 December 1969) is a cricket umpire from Barbados. His One Day International (ODI) umpiring debut was on 7 August 2011, in a match between Canada and Afghanistan in the 2011–13 ICC World Cricket League Championship. He officiated in his first Twenty20 International (T20I) match, between the West Indies and Australia, on 27 March 2012.

He is a member of the International Cricket Council (ICC) International Panel of Umpires and Referees, representing the West Indies.

He was one of the on-field umpires for the 2018 Under-19 Cricket World Cup, and the 2018 ICC Women's World Twenty20. In February 2020, the ICC named him as one of the umpires to officiate in matches during the 2020 ICC Women's T20 World Cup in Australia.

In March 2021, in the series between the West Indies and Sri Lanka, Brathwaite stood in his first Test as an umpire.

== See also ==
- List of Test cricket umpires
- List of One Day International cricket umpires
- List of Twenty20 International cricket umpires
