= Zahid Bassarath =

Trinidadian cricket umpire (born 1983)

Personal information
- Born: 11 May 1983 (age 43); Moruga, Trinidad and Tobago
- Role: Umpire

Umpiring information
- ODIs umpired: 1 (2025)
- T20Is umpired: 14 (2024–2025)
- WODIs umpired: 8 (2013–2019)
- WT20Is umpired: 5 (2018–2019)
- Source: Cricinfo, 16 October 2017

Zahid Bassarath (born 11 May 1983) is a Trinidadian cricket umpire. He has stood in domestic matches in the 2016–17 Regional Four Day Competition and was the onfield umpire for the Women's One Day Internationals between the West Indies and Sri Lanka in October 2017.

== See also ==
- List of One Day International cricket umpires
- List of Twenty20 International cricket umpires
