= Deighton Butler =

West Indian cricketer (born 1974)

Personal information
- Full name: Deighton Kelvin Butler
- Born: 17 July 1974 (age 52); South Rivers, St Vincent
- Batting: Left-handed
- Bowling: Left-arm fast-medium

International information
- National side: West Indies
- ODI debut (cap 128): 2 August 2005 v Sri Lanka
- Last ODI: 1 March 2006 v New Zealand
- Only T20I (cap 3): 16 February 2006 v New Zealand

Domestic team information
- Years: Team
- 2000–2010: Windward Islands

Umpiring information
- ODIs umpired: 1 (2025)
- T20Is umpired: 14 (2024–2025)
- WODIs umpired: 5 (2017–2023)
- WT20Is umpired: 2 (2023)

Career statistics
Competition	ODI	T20I	FC	LA
Matches	5	1	64	32
Runs scored	25	–	1,225	135
Batting average	25.00	–	14.93	9.00
100s/50s	0/0	–	0/4	0/0
Top score	13*	–	66	15*
Balls bowled	246	18	9,676	1,326
Wickets	3	0	176	27
Bowling average	62.66	–	26.20	35.03
5 wickets in innings	0	–	2	0
10 wickets in match	0	–	0	0
Best bowling	1/25	–	5/29	4/30
Catches/stumpings	0/–	1/–	42/–	9/–
- Source: Cricinfo, 30 August 2020

Deighton Calvin Butler (born 14 July 1974) is a West Indies international cricket player and umpire who played five One-day International matches and one Twenty20 international in 2005 and 2006.

Butler has played for Windward Islands from 2000 to 2010 and was primarily a left-arm fast-medium swing bowler. He first played for West Indies in the Indian Oil Cup competition in Sri Lanka in 2005, taking three wickets in three matches. He was later picked for the ODI side in New Zealand in 2006, playing in two matches but failing to take a wicket. He is a useful lower-order batsman.

He played league cricket for Linthwaite in the Drakes Huddersfield Cricket League in England.

He is now an umpire and stood in matches in the 2016–17 Regional Super50 tournament in the West Indies.

== See also ==
- List of One Day International cricket umpires – List of cricket umpires
- List of Twenty20 International cricket umpires – List of umpires
