= Carl Tuckett =

West Indian cricketer (born 1970)

Personal information
- Full name: Carl McArthur Tuckett
- Born: 18 May 1970 (age 56); Charlestown, Saint Kitts and Nevis
- Batting: Right-handed
- Bowling: Right-arm fast-medium

International information
- National side: West Indies
- Only ODI (cap 88): 8 April 1998 v England

Domestic team information
- Years: Team
- 1994–2004: Leeward Islands

Umpiring information
- WODIs umpired: 1 (2022)
- WT20Is umpired: 6 (2017–2022)

Career statistics
Competition	ODI	FC	LA
Matches	1	41	31
Runs scored	–	1,591	306
Batting average	–	30.01	25.50
100s/50s	–	1/9	0/1
Top score	–	142	71*
Balls bowled	48	3,650	846
Wickets	2	73	13
Bowling average	20.50	19.97	42.38
5 wickets in innings	0	1	0
10 wickets in match	0	0	0
Best bowling	2/41	6/25	2/24
Catches/stumpings	0/–	15/–	11/–
- Source: Cricket Archive, 26 October 2010

Carl McArthur Tuckett (born 18 May 1970) is a West Indian former cricketer who played one One Day International (ODI) in 1998. He represented Leeward Islands in the West Indian domestic circuit. He is a right arm medium fast bowler. In his only ODI, he had figures of 2 wickets for 41 runs from 8 overs against England at Queen's Park Oval, Port-Of-Spain, Trinidad, on 8 April 1998. In that match, he dismissed Alec Stewart and Graeme Hick.

Following his career as a player, he is now an umpire and stood in the tour matches between St Kitts Invitational XI against an England XI in April 2015. He made his first-class umpiring debut in November 2015, umpiring a game between the Leeward Islands and Trinidad and Tobago during the 2015–16 Regional Four Day Competition. In October 2016 he was selected as one of the eight umpires to stand in matches in the 2016 ICC World Cricket League Division Four tournament.
