= Jamaica Kingsmen =

Jamaica based franchise cricket team in the Caribbean Premier League

- Official logo of the Jamaica Kingsmen
- League: Caribbean Premier League

Personnel
- Captain: Rovman Powell
- Coach: Grant Bradburn
- Owner: FKS Group

Team information
- City: Kingston, Jamaica
- Founded: 2026
- Home ground: Sabina Park
- Capacity: 20,000

The Jamaica Kingsmen is a professional Twenty20 cricket team based in Kingston, Jamaica, that competes in the Caribbean Premier League (CPL). Established in 2026, the team was founded following the acquisition of a new franchise slot by Pakistani businessman Fawad Sarwar.

== Team identity ==
The franchise is owned by US-based Kingsmen Sports Enterprise, known for its investments in sports and global business. They also own Hyderabad Kingsmen in Pakistan Super League and Chicago Kingsmen in Minor League Cricket, US

== Home ground ==
The Jamaica Kingsmen play their home matches at the historic Sabina Park in Kingston.

== See also ==
- Cricket in the West Indies
- Jamaica Tallawahs
- Jamaica Empress
