= 2020–21 Super50 Cup =

Cricket tournament

2020–21 Regional Super50
- Dates: 7 – 27 February 2021
- Administrator: CWI
- Cricket format: List A (50 overs)
- Tournament format(s): Group stage, finals
- Champions: Trinidad and Tobago (13th title)
- Participants: 6
- Matches: 19
- Most runs: Jason Mohammed (327)
- Most wickets: Gudakesh Motie (17)

The 2020–21 Super50 Cup was the 47th edition of the Super50 Cup, the domestic limited-overs cricket competition for the countries of the Cricket West Indies (CWI). The tournament took place in February 2021 in Antigua and Barbuda. Six teams competed in the tournament – Barbados, Guyana, Jamaica, the Leeward Islands, Trinidad and Tobago, and the Windward Islands. The West Indies Emerging Team won the previous edition of the competition.

On 15 June 2020, CWI held a players' draft for the 2020–21 tournament. The draft took place across two rounds, with each team signing a minimum of fifteen players. In December 2020, Cricket West Indies confirmed that the United States, Canada, Combined Campuses and Colleges and the West Indies Emerging Team would not be taking part in the tournament. On 25 January 2021, CWI announced the schedule for the tournament, with all the squads confirmed two days later.

Following the conclusion of the group stage, Guyana, Jamaica, Trinidad and Tobago and the Windward Islands had all qualified for the semi-finals, with Barbados and the Leeward Islands facing each other in the fifth-place play-off match. In the first semi-final, Trinidad and Tobago beat Jamaica by six wickets to advance to the final. The second semi-final saw Guyana beat the Windward Islands by 95 runs to join Trinidad and Tobago in the final. Trinidad and Tobago won the tournament, beating Guyana by 152 runs in the final.

== Squads ==
Barbados	Guyana	Jamaica	Leeward Islands	Trinidad and Tobago	Windward Islands
Jason Holder (c); Joshua Bishop; Shamarh Brooks; Jonathan Carter; Roston Chase; Dominic Drakes; Jonathan Drakes; Justin Greaves; Keon Harding; Chemar Holder; Kyle Hope; Shai Hope; Akeem Jordan; Nicholas Kirton; Zachary McCaskie; Ashley Nurse; Tevyn Walcott	Leon Johnson (c); Shimron Hetmyer (vc); Christopher Barnwell; Anthony Bramble; Assad Fudadin; ~~Trevon Griffith~~; Chandrapaul Hemraj; Tevin Imlach; Keon Joseph; Ramaal Lewis; Gudakesh Motie; Veerasammy Permaul; Akshaya Persaud; Raymon Reifer; Kemol Savory; Romario Shepherd; Kevin Sinclair; Nial Smith	Rovman Powell (c); Derval Green (vc); Fabian Allen; Dennis Bulli; Sheldon Cottrell; Javelle Glen; Brandon King; Andre McCarthy; Jamie Merchant; Romaine Morrison; Paul Palmer; Jeavor Royal; Odean Smith; Aldane Thomas; Oshane Thomas	Devon Thomas (c); Montcin Hodge (vc); Colin Archibald; Sheeno Berridge; Quinton Boatswain; Keacy Carty; Nino Henry; Kofi James; Amir Jangoo (wk); Nitish Kumar; Jeremiah Louis; Ashmead Nedd; Kieran Powell; Ross Powell; Hayden Walsh Jr.; Terrence Warde	Kieron Pollard (c); Darren Bravo (vc); Akeal Hosein; Imran Khan; Evin Lewis; Jason Mohammed; Sunil Narine; Nicholas Pooran; Kjorn Ottley; Khary Pierre; Anderson Phillip; Denesh Ramdin; Ravi Rampaul; Jayden Seales; Lendl Simmons	Sunil Ambris (c); Alick Athanaze; Roland Cato; Keron Cottoy; Kenneth Dember; Larry Edwards; Andre Fletcher; Ryan John; Ray Jordan; Desron Maloney; Obed McCoy; Preston McSween; Kimani Melius; Emmanuel Stewart; Kevin Stoute

Ahead of the tournament, Kyle Hope and Shai Hope were initially ruled out of the Barbados team after testing positive for COVID-19. Tevyn Walcott and Zachary McCaskie were named as their replacements. Guayana's Trevon Griffith also tested positive for COVID-19, and was replaced by Kemol Savory. On 18 February 2021, the tournament's Technical Committee announced that Kyle Hope and Shai Hope would replace Dominic Drakes and Keon Harding in the Barbados team, and Kofi James replaced Nino Henry for the Leeward Islands. On the same day, Veerasammy Permaul and Raymon Reifer were both added to Guyana's squad.

== Points table ==
Pos	Team	Pld	W	L	NR	Pts	NRR
1	Trinidad and Tobago	5	5	0	0	20	1.072
2	Guyana	5	4	1	0	16	1.071
3	Windward Islands	5	2	3	0	8	−0.714
4	Jamaica	5	2	3	0	8	−0.782
5	Barbados	5	1	4	0	4	0.231
6	Leeward Islands	5	1	4	0	4	−0.736

Source: Cricinfo

Advanced to the Semi-finals Advanced to the 5th place play-off

== Fixtures ==
7 February 2021
Scorecard

Windward Islands; 284 (49.3 overs)	v	Leeward Islands; 253 (47.2 overs)
Kevin Stoute 86 (96); Quinton Boatswain 4/45 (10 overs)		Nitish Kumar 112 (106); Larry Edwards 2/31 (10 overs)

Windward Islands won by 31 runs
Coolidge Cricket Ground, Antigua
Umpires: Joel Wilson and Nigel Duguid
Player of the match: Kevin Stoute (Windward Islands)

- Leeward Islands won the toss and elected to field.
- Ross Powell (Leeward Islands) and Preston McSween (Windward Islands) both made their List A debuts.

8 February 2021
Scorecard

Guyana; 235 (41.4 overs)	v	Barbados; 91/5 (29.3 overs)
Shimron Hetmyer 80 (52); Ashley Nurse 3/44 (10 overs)		Zachary McCaskie 25 (60); Kevin Sinclair 2/17 (7.3 overs)

Guyana won by 56 runs (DLS method)
Coolidge Cricket Ground, Antigua
Umpires: Joel Wilson and Patrick Gustard
Player of the match: Romario Shepherd (Guyana)

- Guyana won the toss and elected to bat.
- Barbados were set a revised target of 148 runs from 29.3 overs due to rain.

10 February 2021
Scorecard

Barbados; 301/8 (50 overs)	v	Leeward Islands; 305/6 (49.3 overs)
Shamarh Brooks 96 (88); Quinton Boatswain 4/62 (10 overs)		Keacy Carty 123* (123); Jason Holder 2/58 (10 overs)

Leeward Islands won by 4 wickets
Coolidge Cricket Ground, Antigua
Umpires: Deighton Butler and Zahid Bassarath
Player of the match: Keacy Carty (Leeward Island)

- Barbados won the toss and elected to bat.
- Keacy Carty (Leeward Islands) scored his first century in List A cricket.

11 February 2021
Scorecard

Jamaica; 258/6 (50 overs)	v	Trinidad and Tobago; 259/5 (40.5 overs)
Brandon King 97 (114); Anderson Phillip 3/66 (10 overs)		Evin Lewis 107 (92); Andre McCarthy 2/30 (10 overs)

Trinidad and Tobago won by 5 wickets
Sir Vivian Richards Stadium, Antigua
Umpires: Carl Tuckett and Leslie Reifer
Player of the match: Evin Lewis (Trinidad and Tobago)

- Trinidad and Tobago won the toss and elected to field.

12 February 2021
Scorecard

Leeward Islands; 244/9 (50 overs)	v	Guyana; 245/5 (47.5 overs)
Kieran Powell 94 (97); Gudakesh Motie 4/45 (9 overs)		Leon Johnson 102* (123); Ashmead Nedd 2/24 (10 overs)

Guyana won by 5 wickets
Coolidge Cricket Ground, Antigua
Umpires: Jacqueline Williams and Zahid Bassarath
Player of the match: Leon Johnson (Guyana)

- Guyana won the toss and elected to field.

13 February 2021
Scorecard

Windward Islands; 227 (49.1 overs)	v	Trinidad and Tobago; 228/6 (45.3/50 overs)
Keron Cottoy 72 (75); Jason Mohammed 3/50 (10 overs)		Lendl Simmons 102 (114); Larry Edwards 2/48 (10 overs)

Trinidad and Tobago won by 4 wickets
Coolidge Cricket Ground, Antigua
Umpires: Nigel Duguid and Patrick Gustard
Player of the match: Lendl Simmons (Trinidad and Tobago)

- Trinidad and Tobago won the toss and elected to field.
- Kenneth Dember (Windward Islands) made his List A debut.

14 February 2021
Scorecard

Guyana; 299/9 (50 overs)	v	Jamaica; 190 (43.5 overs)
Christopher Barnwell 107 (90); Sheldon Cottrell 3/73 (10 overs)		Andre McCarthy 48 (55); Gudakesh Motie 4/55 (10 overs)

Guyana won by 109 runs
Coolidge Cricket Ground, Antigua
Umpires: Deighton Butler and Leslie Reifer
Player of the match: Christopher Barnwell (Guyana)

- Guyana won the toss and elected to bat.

15 February 2021
Scorecard

Barbados; 253/9 (50 overs)	v	Trinidad and Tobago; 256/7 (49.1 overs)
Justin Greaves 62 (81); Kieron Pollard 5/17 (3 overs)		Jason Mohammed 122 (160); Roston Chase 3/21 (10 overs)

Trinidad and Tobago won by 3 wickets
Sir Vivian Richards Stadium, Antigua
Umpires: Jacqueline Williams and Nigel Duguid
Player of the match: Jason Mohammed (Trinidad and Tobago)

- Trinidad and Tobago won the toss and elected to field.

16 February 2021
Scorecard

Windward Islands; 260/8 (50 overs)	v	Jamaica; 168 (36.4 overs)
Keron Cottoy 64 (47); Rovman Powell 3/47 (9 overs)		Andre McCarthy 55 (55); Larry Edwards 3/36 (10 overs)

Windward Islands won by 92 runs
Coolidge Cricket Ground, Antigua
Umpires: Carl Tuckett and Joel Wilson
Player of the match: Keron Cottoy (Windward Islands)

- Windward Islands won the toss and elected to bat.
- Javelle Glen (Jamaica) made his List A debut.

17 February 2021
Scorecard

Leeward Islands; 129 (46.1 overs)	v	Trinidad and Tobago; 130/1 (24.5 overs)
Kieran Powell 29 (51); Ravi Rampaul 3/17 (7 overs)		Kjorn Ottley 47* (68); Quinton Boatswain 1/34 (4.5 overs)

Trinidad and Tobago won by 9 wickets
Coolidge Cricket Ground, Antigua
Umpires: Leslie Reifer and Nigel Duguid
Player of the match: Ravi Rampaul (Trinidad and Tobago)

- Leeward Islands won the toss and elected to bat.
- Jayden Seales (Trinidad and Tobago) made his List A debut.
- Sunil Narine (Trinidad and Tobago) played in his 100th List A match.

18 February 2021
Scorecard

Barbados; 286/8 (50 overs)	v	Windward Islands; 113 (34.4 overs)
Justin Greaves 76 (96); Kevin Stoute 2/41 (6 overs)		Andre Fletcher 34 (48); Akeem Jordan 5/26 (10 overs)

Barbados won by 173 runs
Sir Vivian Richards Stadium, Antigua
Umpires: Patrick Gustard and Zahid Bassarath
Player of the match: Akeem Jordan (Barbados)

- Windward Islands won the toss and elected to field.

19 February 2021
Scorecard

Jamaica; 220 (48.5 overs)	v	Leeward Islands; 187/8 (43 overs)
Fabian Allen 44 (42); Ashmead Nedd 3/23 (10 overs)		Nitish Kumar 51 (96); Jamie Merchant 3/44 (9 overs)

Jamaica won by 6 runs (DLS method)
Sir Vivian Richards Stadium, Antigua
Umpires: Gregory Brathwaite and Nigel Duguid
Player of the match: Jeavor Royal (Jamaica)

- Leeward Islands won the toss and elected to field.
- Leeward Islands were set a revised target of 194 runs from 43 overs due to rain.

20 February 2021
Scorecard

Guyana; 187 (41.5 overs)	v	Trinidad and Tobago; 189/4 (40.2 overs)
Chandrapaul Hemraj 87 (84); Imran Khan 5/32 (9 overs)		Jason Mohammed 82* (114); Gudakesh Motie 2/36 (10 overs)

Trinidad and Tobago won by 6 wickets
Coolidge Cricket Ground, Antigua
Umpires: Carl Tuckett and Leslie Reifer
Player of the match: Imran Khan (Trinidad and Tobago)

- Trinidad and Tobago won the toss and elected to field.

21 February 2021
Scorecard

Jamaica; 218 (45.3 overs)	v	Barbados; 167 (41.1 overs)
Odean Smith 68* (75); Joshua Bishop 5/35 (10 overs)		Shai Hope 51 (81); Andre McCarthy 6/16 (9.1 overs)

Jamaica won by 51 runs
Coolidge Cricket Ground, Antigua
Umpires: Deighton Butler and Joel Wilson
Player of the match: Andre McCarthy (Jamaica)

- Jamaica won the toss and elected to bat.
- Andre McCarthy (Jamaica) took a hat-trick.

22 February 2021
Scorecard

Windward Islands; 153 (45 overs)	v	Guyana; 155/1 (28.4 overs)
Emmanuel Stewart 46 (82); Keon Joseph 4/24 (8 overs)		Shimron Hetmyer 67* (59); Alick Athanaze 1/30 (7 overs)

Guyana won by 9 wickets
Sir Vivian Richards Stadium, Antigua
Umpires: Gregory Brathwaite and Jacqueline Williams
Player of the match: Keon Joseph (Guyana)

- Windward Islands won the toss and elected to bat.

== Finals ==
1st Semi-final
24 February 2021
Scorecard

Jamaica; 255/7 (50 overs)	v	Trinidad and Tobago; 256/4 (42.1 overs)
John Campbell 88 (131); Ravi Rampaul 4/29 (10 overs)		Lendl Simmons 68 (70); Odean Smith 2/54 (7 overs)

Trinidad and Tobago won by 6 wickets
Coolidge Cricket Ground, Antigua
Umpires: Gregory Brathwaite and Nigel Duguid
Player of the match: Ravi Rampaul (Trinidad and Tobago)

- Trinidad and Tobago won the toss and elected to field.

2nd Semi-final
25 February 2021
Scorecard

Guyana; 305/7 (50 overs)	v	Windward Islands; 210 (46.2 overs)
Shimron Hetmyer 113 (80); Ryan John 3/42 (10 overs)		Alick Athanaze 50 (75); Gudakesh Motie 4/53 (10 overs)

Guyana won by 95 runs
Coolidge Cricket Ground, Antigua
Umpires: Joel Wilson and Patrick Gustard
Player of the match: Shimron Hetmyer (Guyana)

- Windward Islands won the toss and elected to field.

5th place play-off
26 February 2021
Scorecard

Barbados; 265/7 (50 overs)	v	Leeward Islands; 270/3 (48.3 overs)
Jonathan Carter 100 (121); Alzarri Joseph 3/44 (10 overs)		Devon Thomas 117 (130); Ashley Nurse 1/38 (8 overs)

Leeward Islands won by 7 wickets
Sir Vivian Richards Stadium, Antigua
Umpires: Deighton Butler and Nigel Duguid
Player of the match: Devon Thomas (Leeward Islands)

- Barbados won the toss and elected to bat.

Final
27 February 2021
Scorecard

Trinidad and Tobago; 362/5 (50 overs)	v	Guyana; 210 (43.5 overs)
Lendl Simmons 146 (145); Romario Shepherd 2/105 (10 overs)		Raymon Reifer 97* (112); Ravi Rampaul 4/52 (10 overs)

Trinidad and Tobago won by 152 runs
Coolidge Cricket Ground, Antigua
Umpires: Gregory Brathwaite and Patrick Gustard
Player of the match: Lendl Simmons (Trinidad and Tobago)

- Guyana won the toss and elected to field.
