= 2024 Global T20 Canada =

Fourth edition of the Global T20 Canada

- Dates: 25 July – 11 August 2024
- Administrator: Cricket Canada
- Cricket format: Twenty20
- Tournament format(s): Round-robin and playoffs
- Champions: Toronto Nationals (1st title)
- Participants: 6
- Matches: 25
- Player of the series: Junaid Siddique (Toronto Nationals)
- Most runs: George Munsey (Brampton Wolves) (218)
- Most wickets: Romario Shepherd (Toronto Nationals) (14); Junaid Siddique (Toronto Nationals) (14)
- Official website: GT20 Canada

The 2024 Global T20 Canada was the fourth edition of Global T20 Canada, a Twenty20 professional cricket tournament that was played at the TD Cricket Arena in Brampton, Ontario, Canada. The tournament began on 25 July and the final was played on 11 August 2024. Montreal Tigers were the defending champions.

In the final, Toronto Nationals defeated Montreal Tigers to win their maiden title.

== Background ==
On 10 June 2024, it was announced that Global T20 Canada would return for a fourth season in 2024, being held from 25 July to 11 August at TD Cricket Arena at CAA Centre in Brampton. On 21 June 2024, the players draft was held to determine the lineups of the six franchises for the 2024 season.

Mississauga Panthers were replaced by Bangla Tigers Mississauga.

== Teams ==
The following teams, squads and coaches were announced for the tournament.

Babar Azam, Mohammad Rizwan and Shaheen Shah Afridi’s respective requests for no-objection certificate to participate in the league were declined by the Pakistan Cricket Board citing the board’s workload management policy.

Team	Debut	Captain	Coach
Brampton Wolves	2019	David Warner	Dougie Brown
Bangla Tigers Mississauga	2024	Shakib Al Hasan	Julian Wood
Montreal Tigers	2018	Chris Lynn	Dav Whatmore
Toronto Nationals	2018	Colin Munro	Donovan Miller
Surrey Jaguars	2023	Marcus Stoinis	Lalchand Rajput
Vancouver Knights	2018	Usman Khawaja	Richard Pybus

== Squads ==
Surrey Jaguars	Bangla Tigers Mississauga	Brampton Wolves	Montreal Tigers	Toronto Nationals	Vancouver Knights
Marcus Stoinis (c); Uday Bhagwan; Rizwan Cheema; Navneet Dhaliwal; Terrance Hinds; Ben Lister; Kyle Mayers; Brandon McMullen; Shreyas Movva; Mohammad Nabi; Sunil Narine; Junaid Siddiqui; Virandeep Singh; Harmeet Singh; Hamza Tariq; Logan van Beek; Mansab Gill; Padam Joshi	Shakib Al Hasan (c); Iftikhar Ahmed; Rahmanullah Gurbaz; Dilon Heyliger; Shoriful Islam; Rayyan Pathan; Pargat Singh; Tajinder Singh; Odean Smith; Muhammad Waseem; David Wiese; Hazratullah Zazai; Gurbaz Bajwa; Navjot Dosanjh; Farhan Khan; Nav Pabreja; Ravinder Reddy; Gurpal Sidhu	David Warner (c); Carlos Brathwaite; Josh Brown; Aryan Dutt; Jack Jarvis; Muhammad Jawadullah; Aaron Johnson; Abhijai Mansingh; George Munsey; Ravinderpal Singh; Kanwarpal Tathgur; Andrew Tye; Beau Webster; Harmandeep Singh; Kobe Herft; Akhil Kumar; Robin Singh; Samarjeet Singh	Chris Lynn (c); Aayan Afzal Khan; Dilpreet Bajwa; Gerhard Erasmus; Zahoor Khan; Ben Manenti; Azmatullah Omarzai; Sherfane Rutherford; Mohammad Saifuddin; Kaleem Sana; Tim Seifert; Naveen-ul-Haq; Parveen Kumar; Yuvraj Hundal; Prabhasees Raina; Charanjit Randhawa; Anoop Ravi; Aaditya Varadarajan; ~~Tom Latham~~	Colin Munro (c); Fabian Allen; Jason Behrendorff; Saad Bin Zafar; Rassie van der Dussen; Nikhil Dutta; Andries Gous; Unmukt Chand; Nicholas Kirton; Mohammad Nawaz; Rohit Paudel; Roston Chase; Romario Shepherd; Junaid Siddiqui; Armaan Kapoor; Jatinderpal Matharu; Kanwar Mann; Dilraj Deol; Muhammad Rohid Khan; Jagandeep Singh; ~~Shaheen Afridi~~; ~~Rishad Hossain~~	Usman Khawaja (c); Asif Ali; Dipendra Singh Airee; Mohammad Amir; Richie Berrington; Reeza Hendricks; Jeremy Gordon; Rishiv Joshi; Nitish Kumar; Sandeep Lamichhane; Dwaine Pretorius; Michael Rippon; Harsh Thaker; Paul van Meekeren; Ajayveer Hundal; Munir Ahmad; Yuvraj Samra; Sarmad Anwar; Mandeep Girdhar; Shubham Sharma; ~~Babar Azam~~; ~~Mohammad Rizwan~~; ~~Ruben Trumpelmann~~

== Points table ==
The tournament followed a round-robin format in the league stage wherein each team played seven games, and the top four teams qualified for the playoffs.

Pos	Team	Pld	W	L	NR	Pts	NRR	Qualification
1	Montreal Tigers	7	4	1	2	10	1.389	Advanced to Qualifier 1
2	Brampton Wolves	7	4	2	1	9	0.771	Advanced to Qualifier 1
3	Bangla Tigers Mississauga	7	4	2	1	9	−0.504	Advanced to Eliminator
4	Toronto Nationals	7	3	3	1	7	−0.395	Advanced to Eliminator
5	Surrey Jaguars	7	1	4	2	4	−0.283	
6	Vancouver Knights	7	1	5	1	3	−0.758	

Source: ESPNcricinfo

== Fixtures ==
Match 1
25 July 2024
16:00 (D/N)
Scorecard

Vancouver Knights; 110 (19.3 overs)	v	Toronto Nationals; 111/2 (14.4 overs)
Reeza Hendricks 23 (25); Junaid Siddiqui 4/25 (3.3 overs)		Colin Munro 44 (39); Sandeep Lamichhane 1/29 (4 overs)

Toronto Nationals won by 8 wickets
TD Cricket Arena, Brampton
Umpires: Leslie Reifer (WI) and Asif Yaqoob (Pak)
Player of the match: Junaid Siddique (Toronto Nationals)

- Toronto Nationals won the toss and elected to field.

Match 2
26 July 2024
11:00
Scorecard

Montreal Tigers; 189/6 (20 overs)	v	Bangla Tigers Mississauga; 156/8 (20 overs)
Tim Seifert 44 (24); David Wiese 3/30 (4 overs)		Rahmanullah Gurbaz 64 (39); Aayan Afzal Khan 4/40 (4 overs)

Montreal Tigers won by 33 runs
TD Cricket Arena, Brampton
Umpires: Arnold Maddela (Can) and Rohan Shah (Can)
Player of the match: Ashton Agar (Montreal Tigers)

- Bangla Tigers Mississauga won the toss and elected to field.

Match 3
26 July 2024
16:00 (D/N)
Scorecard

Brampton Wolves; 198/6 (20 overs)	v	Surrey Jaguars; 139/7 (20 overs)
George Munsey 69 (44); Ben Lister 2/26 (4 overs)		Shreyas Movva 41 (40); Thomas Draca 3/18 (4 overs)

Brampton Wolves won by 59 runs
TD Cricket Arena, Brampton
Umpires: Harry Grewal (Can) and Carl Tuckett (WI)
Player of the match: George Munsey (Brampton Wolves)

- Surrey Jaguars won the toss and elected to field.

Match 4
27 July 2024
11:00
Scorecard

Bangla Tigers Mississauga; 152/7 (20 overs)	v	Vancouver Knights; 130/6 (20 overs)
Iftikhar Ahmed 50* (40); Sandeep Lamichhane 2/32 (4 overs)		Harsh Thaker 79* (67); Shakib Al Hasan 3/10 (4 overs)

Bangla Tigers Mississauga won by 22 runs
TD Cricket Arena, Brampton
Umpires: Carl Tuckett (WI) and Asif Yaqoob (Pak)
Player of the match: Iftikhar Ahmed (Bangla Tigers Mississauga)

- Vancouver Knights won the toss and elected to field.

Match 5
27 July 2024
16:00 (D/N)
Scorecard

Brampton Wolves; 110 (19.1 overs)	v	Toronto Nationals; 111/2 (13.2 overs)
Beau Webster 25 (25); Junaid Siddique 3/23 (3.1 overs)		Unmukt Chand 53* (40); Jack Jarvis 1/16 (3 overs)

Toronto Nationals won by 8 wickets
TD Cricket Arena, Brampton
Umpires: Arnold Maddela (Can) and Leslie Reifer (WI)
Player of the match: Junaid Siddique (Brampton Wolves)

- Brampton Wolves won the toss and elected to bat.

Match 6
28 July 2024
11:00
Scorecard

Montreal Tigers; 144/7 (20 overs)	v	Vancouver Knights; 134/6 (20 overs)
Corbin Bosch 35 (25); Mohammad Amir 2/11 (4 overs)		Reeza Hendricks 34 (35); Aayan Afzal Khan 3/15 (4 overs)

Montreal Tigers won by 10 runs
TD Cricket Arena, Brampton
Umpires: Harry Grewal (Can) and Leslie Reifer (WI)
Player of the match: Aayan Afzal Khan (Montreal Tigers)

- Vancouver Knights won the toss and elected to field.

Match 7
28 July 2024
16:00 (D/N)
Scorecard

Surrey Jaguars; 161/6 (20 overs)	v	Toronto Nationals; 81 (17.1 overs)
Marcus Stoinis 57 (37); Muhammad Rohid 2/31 (4 overs)		Unmukt Chand 21 (17); Sunil Narine 3/5 (4 overs)

Surrey Jaguars won by 80 runs
TD Cricket Arena, Brampton
Umpires: Arnold Maddela (Can) and Carl Tuckett (WI)
Player of the match: Marcus Stoinis (Surrey Jaguars)

- Toronto Nationals won the toss and elected to field.

Match 8
30 July 2024
11:00
Scorecard

Bangla Tigers Mississauga; 168/7 (20 overs)	v	Toronto Nationals; 166/7 (20 overs)
David Wiese 38* (17); Saad Bin Zafar 2/27 (4 overs)		Nicholas Kirton 74 (54); Ali Khan 2/33 (4 overs)

Bangla Tigers Mississauga won by 2 runs
TD Cricket Arena, Brampton
Umpires: Leslie Reifer (WI) and Rohan Shah (Can)
Player of the match: David Wiese (Bangla Tigers Mississauga)

- Toronto Nationals won the toss and elected to field.

Match 9
30 July 2024
16:00 (D/N)
Scorecard

Montreal Tigers; 166/7 (20 overs)	v	Brampton Wolves; 124 (18.5 overs)
Dilpreet Bajwa 100* (55); Andrew Tye 3/41 (4 overs)		George Munsey 54 (34); Azmatullah Omarzai 4/21 (4 overs)

Montreal Tigers won by 42 runs
TD Cricket Arena, Brampton
Umpires: Harry Grewal (Can) and Asif Yaqoob (Pak)
Player of the match: Dilpreet Bajwa (Montreal Tigers)

- Montreal Tigers won the toss and elected to bat.

Match 10
31 July 2024
11:00
Scorecard

Surrey Jaguars; 101 (19.5 overs)	v	Bangla Tigers Mississauga; 102/6 (19 overs)
Marcus Stoinis 36 (29); Shoriful Islam 3/11 (4 overs)		David Wiese 27* (19); Sunil Narine 3/19 (4 overs)

Bangla Tigers Mississauga won by 4 wickets
TD Cricket Arena, Brampton
Umpires: Rohan Shah (Can) and Carl Tuckett (WI)
Player of the match: David Wiese (Bangla Tigers Mississauga)

- Surrey Jaguars won the toss and elected to bat.

Match 11
31 July 2024
16:00 (D/N)
Scorecard

Vancouver Knights; 149/4 (20 overs)	v	Brampton Wolves; 150/4 (18.1 overs)
Richie Berrington 38* (25); Thomas Draca 2/17 (3 overs)		Beau Webster 49* (37); Rishiv Joshi 1/23 (3 overs)

Brampton Wolves won by 6 wickets
TD Cricket Arena, Brampton
Umpires: Arnold Maddela (Can) and Leslie Reifer (WI)
Player of the match: Beau Webster (Brampton Wolves)

- Vancouver Knights won the toss and elected to bat.

Match 12
2 August 2024
11:00
Scorecard

Montreal Tigers; 25/2 (2 overs)	v	Toronto Nationals
Dilpreet Bajwa 18* (6); Jason Behrendorff 2/4 (1 over)

No result
TD Cricket Arena, Brampton
Umpires: Rohan Shah (Can) and Carl Tuckett (WI)

- Toronto Nationals won the toss and elected to field.
- The match was reduced to 6 overs per side due to rain.
- Rain prevented any further play.

Match 13
2 August 2024
16:00 (D/N)
Scorecard

Vancouver Knights; 28/1 (5 overs)	v	Surrey Jaguars
Usman Khawaja 11* (9); Logan van Beek 1/18 (2 overs)

No result
TD Cricket Arena, Brampton
Umpires: Arnold Maddela (Can) and Asif Yaqoob (Pak)

- Surrey Jaguars won the toss and elected to field.
- The match was reduced to 18 overs per side due to rain.
- Rain prevented any further play.

Match 14
3 August 2024
11:00
Scorecard

Bangla Tigers Mississauga; 79 (13 overs)	v	Brampton Wolves; 80/2 (11.2 overs)
Iftikhar Ahmed 19 (17); Thomas Draca 3/10 (2 overs)		David Warner 44* (33); David Wiese 1/8 (3 overs)

Brampton Wolves won by 8 wickets
TD Cricket Arena, Brampton
Umpires: Arnold Maddela (Can) and Asif Yaqoob (Pak)
Player of the match: Andrew Tye (Brampton Wolves)

- Brampton Wolves won the toss and elected to field.

Match 15
3 August 2024
16:00 (D/N)
Scorecard

Toronto Nationals; 127/9 (20 overs)	v	Vancouver Knights; 108 (18.5 overs)
Roston Chase 23 (27); Mohammad Amir 3/24 (4 overs)		Richie Berrington 52 (44); Romario Shepherd 3/17 (3.5 overs)

Toronto Nationals won by 19 runs
TD Cricket Arena, Brampton
Umpires: Carl Tuckett (WI) and Leslie Reifer (WI)
Player of the match: Romario Shepherd (Toronto Nationals)

- Vancouver Knights won the toss and elected to field.

Match 16
4 August 2024
11:00
Scorecard

Surrey Jaguars; 124 (19.2 overs)	v	Brampton Wolves; 128/4 (15.1 overs)
Marcus Stoinis 39 (23); Beau Webster 3/16 (4 overs)		George Munsey 46* (35); Marcus Stoinis 1/6 (2 overs)

Brampton Wolves won by 6 wickets
TD Cricket Arena, Brampton
Umpires: Rohan Shah (Can) and Carl Tuckett (WI)
Player of the match: Beau Webster (Brampton Wolves)

- Brampton Wolves won the toss and elected to field.

Match 17
4 August 2024
16:00 (D/N)
Scorecard

Montreal Tigers; 109 (19.2 overs)	v	Vancouver Knights; 113/5 (18.4 overs)
Azmatullah Omarzai 30 (26); Mohammad Amir 3/18 (4 overs)		Reeza Hendricks 39 (30); Gerhard Erasmus 2/13 (3 overs)

Vancouver Knights won by 5 wickets
TD Cricket Arena, Brampton
Umpires: Amol Bhatt (Can) and Asif Yaqoob (Pak)
Player of the match: Mohammad Amir (Vancouver Knights)

- Vancouver Knights won the toss and elected to field.

Match 18
5 August 2024
11:00
Scorecard

Surrey Jaguars; 108/8 (18 overs)	v	Bangla Tigers Mississauga; 109/8 (17.3 overs)
Shreyas Movva 21 (25); Curtis Campher 4/17 (3 overs)		Shakib Al Hasan 36 (30); Ben Lister 3/12 (4 overs)

Bangla Tigers Mississauga won by 2 wickets
TD Cricket Arena, Brampton
Umpires: Arnold Maddela (Can) and Asif Yaqoob (Pak)
Player of the match: Shakib Al Hasan (Bangla Tigers Mississauga)

- Bangla Tigers Mississauga won the toss and elected to field.
- The match was reduced to 18 overs per side due to rain.

Match 19
5 August 2024
16:00 (D/N)
Scorecard

Toronto Nationals; 52 (11.1 overs)	v	Montreal Tigers; 56/3 (11.3 overs)
Jatinderpal Matharu 12 (25); Kaleem Sana 4/13 (3 overs)		Tim Seifert 15* (15); Junaid Siddiqui 1/4 (2 overs)

Montreal Tigers won by 7 wickets
TD Cricket Arena, Brampton
Umpires: Bijal Patel (Can) and Leslie Reifer (WI)
Player of the match: Kaleem Sana (Toronto Nationals)

- Montreal Tigers won the toss and elected to field.

Match 20
6 August 2024
11:00
Scorecard

Brampton Wolves	v	Bangla Tigers Mississauga

Match abandoned
TD Cricket Arena, Brampton
Umpires: Arnold Maddela (Can) and Carl Tuckett (WI)

- No toss.
- No play was possible due to rain.

Match 21
6 August 2024
16:00 (D/N)
Scorecard

Surrey Jaguars; 12/2 (2 overs)	v	Montreal Tigers
Brandon McMullen 4* (3); Corbin Bosch 1/4 (1 over); Kaleem Sana 1/4 (1 over)

No result
TD Cricket Arena, Brampton
Umpires: Harry Grewal (Can) and Asif Yaqoob (Pak)

- Montreal Tigers won the toss and elected to field.
- The match was reduced to 5 overs per side due to rain.
- Rain prevented any further play.

== Play-offs ==
Qualifier 1
9 August 2024 - Brampton
1	Montreal Tigers	Rainout (NR)
2	Brampton Wolves	Rainout (NR)
Eliminator
9 August 2024 - Brampton
3	Bangla Tigers Mississauga	Rainout (NR)
4	Toronto Nationals	Rainout (NR)

Qualifier 2
10 August 2024 - Brampton
Q1L	Brampton Wolves	141/8 (20 overs)
EW	Toronto Nationals	143/5 (18.2 overs)

Final
11 August 2024 - Brampton
Q1W	Montreal Tigers	96/9 (20 overs)
Q2W	Toronto Nationals	97/2 (15 overs)

Qualifier 1
9 August 2024
11:00
Scorecard

Montreal Tigers	v	Brampton Wolves

Match abandoned
TD Cricket Arena, Brampton
Umpires: Harry Grewal (Can) and Carl Tuckett (WI)

- No toss.
- No play was possible due to rain.
- Montreal Tigers progressed to the final because they finished higher in the Points table than Brampton Wolves.

Eliminator
9 August 2024
16:00 (D/N)
Scorecard

Bangla Tigers Mississauga	v	Toronto Nationals

Match abandoned
TD Cricket Arena, Brampton
Umpires: Arnold Maddela (Can) and Leslie Reifer (WI)

- No toss.
- Toronto Nationals progressed to Qualifier 2 with a walkover from Bangla Tigers Mississauga.

Qualifier 2
10 August 2024
12:00
Scorecard

Brampton Wolves; 141/8 (20 overs)	v	Toronto Nationals; 143/5 (18.2 overs)
Nick Hobson 51* (34); Romario Shepherd 4/32 (4 overs)		Colin Munro 36 (20); Akhil Kumar 3/31 (3.2 overs)

Toronto Nationals won by 5 wickets
TD Cricket Arena, Brampton
Umpires: Rohan Shah (Can) and Asif Yaqoob (Pak)
Player of the match: Romario Shepherd (Toronto Nationals)

- Toronto Nationals won the toss and elected to field.

Final
11 August 2024
12:00
Scorecard

Montreal Tigers; 96/9 (20 overs)	v	Toronto Nationals; 97/2 (15 overs)
Corbin Bosch 35 (33); Jason Behrendorff 3/8 (4 overs)		Andries Gous 58* (49); Azmatullah Omarzai 1/17 (4 overs)

Toronto Nationals won by 8 wickets
TD Cricket Arena, Brampton
Umpires: Arnold Maddela (Can) and Carl Tuckett (WI)
Player of the match: Jason Behrendorff (Toronto Nationals)

- Toronto Nationals won the toss and elected to field.
- The match was delayed by approximately two hours due to rain and a wet outfield.

== Statistics ==
=== Most runs ===
Runs	Player	Team	Innings	High score
218	George Munsey	Brampton Wolves	7	69
206	Dilpreet Bajwa	Montreal Tigers	7	100*
158	Nick Hobson	Brampton Wolves	7	51*
154	Reeza Hendricks	Vancouver Knights	7	39
139	Beau Webster	Brampton Wolves	7	49*

- Source ESPNCricinfo

=== Most wickets ===
Wickets	Player	Team	Innings	Best bowling
14	Romario Shepherd	Toronto Nationals	7	4/32
14	Junaid Siddique	Toronto Nationals	8	4/25
11	Jason Behrendorff	Toronto Nationals	7	3/8
11	Azmatullah Omarzai	Montreal Tigers	5	4/21
11	Thomas Draca	Brampton Wolves	6	3/10

- Source ESPNCricinfo

== Controversies ==
In the playoff stage of the tournament, the Qualifier 1 and Eliminator were not played due to rain. In Qualifier 1, the Montreal Tigers were declared winners and qualified for the final directly, as they finished higher in the group stage, while the Brampton Wolves advanced to Qualifier 2. In the Eliminator, the match was not played due to rain, but the match referee chose to play an Super Over between the teams to decide the winner. Shakib Al Hasan, the captain of Bangla Tigers Mississauga, did not attend the toss out of protest and, as a result, the Toronto Nationals were declared the winners, thus advancing to Qualifier 2.

== Broadcasting ==
The competition is being broadcast on the following television and streaming services around the globe

Location	Television broadcaster(s)	Streaming
Australia	Cable/satellite (pay): Fox Sports	foxsports.com.au cricket.com.au
Canada	CBC Television	CBC Gem; Pluto TV; Paramount+
United Kingdom	Cable/satellite (pay): TNT Sports	
Bangladesh	Cable/satellite (pay): T Sports	T Sports app
India; Nepal	Cable/satellite (pay): Star Sports	Fancode
Middle East		Cricbuzz
Pakistan	A Sports	Tamasha
South Africa	SuperSport	
United States	Willow	
Caribbean	FlowSports	
