= 2017 Caribbean Premier League =

Fifth season of the Caribbean Premier League

- Dates: 4 August – 9 September 2017
- Administrator: CPL Limited
- Cricket format: Twenty20
- Tournament format(s): Group stage and knockout
- Champions: Trinbago Knight Riders (2nd title)
- Runners-up: St Kitts & Nevis Patriots
- Participants: 6
- Matches: 34
- Attendance: 378,546 (11,134 per match)
- Player of the series: Chadwick Walton (Guyana Amazon Warriors)
- Most runs: Chadwick Walton (Guyana Amazon Warriors) (458)
- Most wickets: Sohail Tanvir (Guyana Amazon Warriors) (17)
- Official website: cplt20.com

The 2017 Caribbean Premier League (CPLT20) or for sponsorship reasons, Hero CPL 2017 was the fifth season of the Caribbean Premier League, the domestic Twenty20 cricket league in the West Indies. Matches were played in seven countries – Trinidad and Tobago, Saint Kitts and Nevis, Guyana, Barbados, Jamaica, Saint Lucia, with four of the first five matches to be played Lauderhill, Florida, United States.

== Points table ==
Pos	Team	Pld	W	L	NR	Pts	NRR
1	Trinbago Knight Riders (C)	10	8	2	0	16	1.168
2	St Kitts & Nevis Patriots (R)	10	6	3	1	13	1.022
3	Jamaica Tallawahs (4th)	10	6	4	0	12	−0.416
4	Guyana Amazon Warriors (3rd)	10	5	5	0	10	0.834
5	Barbados Tridents	10	4	6	0	8	−0.943
6	St Lucia Stars	10	0	9	1	1	−1.644

- Top four teams will advance to the Playoffs
- advanced to the Qualifier 1
- advanced to the Qualifier 2

== Group stage ==
All times are local time

Match 1
4 August 2017
21:00 (D/N)
Scorecard

(home team) St Lucia Stars; 132/9 (20 overs)	v	Trinbago Knight Riders; 137/1 (10.4 overs)
Andre Fletcher 26 (27); Shadab Khan 2/15 (4 overs)		Colin Munro 66* (39); Jerome Taylor 1/22 (3 overs)

Trinbago Knight Riders won by 9 wickets
Darren Sammy National Cricket Stadium, Gros Islet
Umpires: Gregory Brathwaite (WI) and Langton Rusere (Zim)
Player of the match: Shadab Khan (Trinbago Knight Riders)

- Trinbago Knight Riders won the toss and elected to field.
- Obed McCoy (St Lucia Stars) and Khary Pierre (Trinbago Knight Riders) both made their T20 debuts.

Match 2
5 August 2017
11:00 (D/N)
Scorecard

(home team) Guyana Amazon Warriors; 123/7 (20 Overs)	v	St Kitts & Nevis Patriots; 124/6 (19 Overs)
Chadwick Walton 60 (51); Sheldon Cottrell 2/18 (3 Overs)		Carlos Brathwaite 31 (19); Rayad Emrit 2/14 (3 Overs)

St Kitts and Nevis Patriots won by 4 wickets
Central Broward Regional Park, Lauderhill, Florida
Umpires: Zahid Bassarath (WI) and Leslie Reifer (WI)
Player of the match: Hasan Ali (St Kitts and Nevis Patriots)

- St Kitts and Nevis Patriots won the toss and elected to field.
- Keemo Paul (Guyana Amazon Warriors) and Brandon King (St Kitts and Nevis Patriots) both made their T20 debuts.

Match 3
5 August 2017
15:00 (D/N)
Scorecard

(home team) Barbados Tridents; 142/7 (20 overs)	v	Jamaica Tallawahs; 130/6 (20 overs)
Shoaib Malik 33 (27); Imad Wasim 2/16 (4 overs)		Lendl Simmons 53 (46); Akeal Hosein 2/24 (4 overs)

Barbados Tridents won by 12 runs
Central Broward Regional Park, Lauderhill, Florida
Umpires: Sameer Bandekar (USA) and Johan Cloete (SA)
Player of the match: Akeal Hosein (Barbados Tridents)

- Barbados Tridents won the toss and elected to bat.
- Ravi Rampaul took his 150th Twenty20 wicket.

Match 4
6 August 2017
11:00 (D/N)
Scorecard

(home team) St Kitts & Nevis Patriots; 132/3 (20 overs)	v	Guyana Amazon Warriors; 128/8 (20 overs)
Chris Gayle 66* (55); Steven Jacobs 1/22 (4 overs)		Jason Mohammed 41 (41); Sheldon Cottrell 2/28 (4 overs)

St. Kitts and Nevis Patriots won by 4 runs
Central Broward Regional Park, Lauderhill, Florida
Umpires: Zahid Bassarath (WI) and Leslie Reifer (WI)
Player of the match: Chris Gayle (St Kitts and Nevis Patriots)

- Guyana Amazon Warriors won the toss and elected to field.
- Gajanand Singh (Guyana Amazon Warriors) made his T20 debut.

Match 5
6 August 2017
15:00 (D/N)
Scorecard

(home team) Jamaica Tallawahs; 154/5 (20 overs)	v	Barbados Tridents; 142 (20 overs)
Andre McCarthy 60 (44); Wahab Riaz 3/32 (4 overs)		Kieron Pollard 62 (33); Mohammad Sami 4/12 (4 overs)

Jamaica Tallawahs won by 12 runs
Central Broward Regional Park, Lauderhill, Florida
Umpires: Johan Cloete (SA) and Emmerson Carlington (WI)
Player of the match: Andre McCarthy (Jamaica Tallawahs)

- Jamaica Tallawahs won the toss and elected to bat

Match 6
7 August 2017
20:00 (D/N)
Scorecard

St Lucia Stars; 118/9 (20 Overs)	v	(home team) Trinbago Knight Riders; 120/6 (15.4 Overs)
Andre Fletcher 40 (45); Kevon Cooper 3/21 (4 Overs)		Shadab Khan 30* (33); Shane Shillingford 4/22 (4 Overs)

Trinbago Knight Riders won by 4 wickets
Queen's Park Oval, Port of Spain
Umpires: Gregory Brathwaite (WI) and Nigel Duguid (WI)
Player of the match: Shadab Khan (Trinbago Knight Riders)

- Trinbago Knight Riders won the toss and elected to field.

Match 7
9 August 2017
20:00 (D/N)
Scorecard

(home team) Trinbago Knight Riders; 147 (19.5 overs)	v	Jamaica Tallawahs; 148/6 (19.2 overs)
Colin Munro 41 (25); Odean Smith 3/20 (3.5 overs)		Kumar Sangakkara 47 (41); Sunil Narine 2/21 (4 overs)

Jamaica Tallawahs won by 4 wickets
Queen's Park Oval, Port of Spain
Umpires: Nigel Duguid (WI) and Langton Rusere (Zim)
Player of the match: Kesrick Williams (Jamaica Tallawahs)

- Jamaica Tallawahs won the toss and elected to field.
- Brendon McCullum scored his 8000th T20 run
- Odean Smith (Jamaica Tallawahs) made his T20 debut.

Match 8
10 August 2017
20:00 (D/N)
Scorecard

Barbados Tridents; 196/4 (20 overs)	v	(home team) St Lucia Stars; 129/6 (15.2 overs)
Kieron Pollard 83* (35); Kyle Mayers 2/30 (4 overs)		Darren Sammy 60* (29); Wayne Parnell 3/28 (3 overs)

Barbados Tridents won by 21 runs (DLS)
Darren Sammy National Cricket Stadium, Gros Islet
Umpires: Zahid Bassarath (WI) and Leslie Reifer (WI)
Player of the match: Kieron Pollard (Barbados Tridents)

- Barbados Tridents won the toss and elected to bat.
- Rain interrupted St. Lucia Stars' innings after 10 overs, reducing the target to 193 in 19 overs. The rain returned again after 15.2 overs ending the match.
- Dwayne Smith scored his 7000th T20 run, Marlon Samuels scored his 4000th and Darren Sammy scored his 3000th.

Match 9
11 August 2017
21:00 (D/N)
Scorecard

Guyana Amazon Warriors; 156/7 (20 overs)	v	(home team) Trinbago Knight Riders; 162/3 (19 overs)
Chadwick Walton 36 (23); Shadab Khan 4/28 (4 overs)		Colin Munro 70* (47); Steven Jacobs 1/31 (4 overs)

Trinbago Knight Riders won by 7 wickets
Queen's Park Oval, Port of Spain
Umpires: Gregory Brathwaite (WI) and Langton Rusere (Zim)
Player of the match: Colin Munro (Trinbago Knight Riders)

- Trinbago Knight Riders won the toss and elected to field.
- Roshon Primus (Guyana Amazon Warriors) made his T20 debut.

Match 10
12 August 2017
17:00 (D/N)
Scorecard

St Kitts & Nevis Patriots; 196/6 (20 Overs)	v	(home team) St Lucia Stars; 163/8 (20 Overs)
Evin Lewis 92 (52); Jerome Taylor 3/46 (4 Overs)		Andre Fletcher 48 (33); Mohammad Nabi 3/15 (4 Overs)

St Kitts and Nevis Patriots won by 33 runs
Darren Sammy National Cricket Stadium, Gros Islet
Umpires: Zahid Bassarath (WI) and Johan Cloete (SA)
Player of the match: Evin Lewis (St Kitts and Nevis Patriots)

- St Lucia Stars won the toss and elected to field.

Match 11
12 August 2017
21:00 (D/N)
Scorecard

Barbados Tridents; 152/9 (20 Overs)	v	(home team) Trinbago Knight Riders; 155/8 (19.1 Overs)
Shoaib Malik 51 (38); Ronsford Beaton 2/24 (4 Overs)		Sunil Narine 79 (45); Shamar Springer 3/32 (4 Overs)

Trinbago Knight Riders won by 2 wickets
Queen's Park Oval, Port of Spain
Umpires: Gregory Brathwaite (WI) and Nigel Duguid (WI)
Player of the match: Sunil Narine (Trinbago Knight Riders)

- Trinbago Knight Riders won the toss and elected to field.
- Shoaib Malik scored his 7000th T20 run.

Match 12
13 August 2017
18:00 (D/N)
Scorecard

(home team) St Lucia Stars; 152/8 (20 Overs)	v	Guyana Amazon Warriors; 153/4 (19.5 Overs)
Johnson Charles 53 (32); Rayad Emrit 4/35 (4 Overs)		Jason Mohammed 38 (31); Kyle Mayers 1/22 (4 Overs)

Guyana Amazon Warriors won by 6 wickets
Darren Sammy National Cricket Stadium, Gros Islet
Umpires: Johan Cloete (SA) and Leslie Reifer (WI)
Player of the match: Rashid Khan (Guyana Amazon Warrior)

- St Lucia Stars won the toss and elected to bat.
- Shane Shillingford took his 50th T20 wicket

Match 13
14 August 2017
20:00 (D/N)
Scorecard

St Kitts & Nevis Patriots; 158/7 (20 overs)	v	(home team) Trinbago Knight Riders; 161/6 (19.3 overs)
Shamarh Brooks 37 (32); Sunil Narine 2/26 (4 overs)		Denesh Ramdin 59* (35); Mohammad Nabi 2/12 (3 overs)

Trinbago Knight Riders won by 4 wickets
Queen's Park Oval, Port of Spain
Umpires: Nigel Duguid (WI) and Langton Rusere (Zim)
Player of the match: Denesh Ramdin (Trinbago Knight Riders)

- Trinbago Knight Riders won the toss and elected to field.
- Mohammad Nabi took his 150th T20 wicket

Match 14
15 August 2017
18:00 (D/N)
Scorecard

(home team) St Lucia Stars; 173/7 (20 overs)	v	Jamaica Tallawahs; 179/5 (19.4 overs)
Andre Fletcher 84* (53); Mohammad Sami 3/27 (4 overs)		Andre McCarthy 61* (37); Marlon Samuels 1/19 (3 overs)

Jamaica Tallawahs won by 5 wickets
Darren Sammy National Cricket Stadium, Gros Islet
Umpires: Zahid Bassarath and Leslie Reifer
Player of the match: Andre McCarthy (Jamaica Tallawahs)

- St Lucia Stars won the toss and elected to bat.
- Andre Fletcher scored his 3000th T20 run.

Match 15
17 August 2017
18:00 (D/N)
Scorecard

Jamaica Tallawahs; 128/7 (20 Overs)	v	(home team) Guyana Amazon Warriors; 126/4 (20 Overs)
Glenn Phillips 51 (47); Steven Jacobs 2/18 (4 Overs)		Chadwick Walton 37 (33); Kesrick Williams 3/30 (4 Overs)

Jamaica Tallawahs won by 2 runs
Providence Stadium, Guyana
Umpires: Gregory Brathwaite (WI) and Langton Rusere (Zim)
Player of the match: Kesrick Williams (Jamaica Tallawahs)

- Guyana Amazon Warriors won the toss and elected to field.

Match 16
18 August 2017
21:00 (D/N)
Scorecard

Barbados Tridents; 168/6 (20 overs)	v	(home team) St Kitts & Nevis Patriots; 84/1 (9.3 Overs)
Kieron Pollard 63* (40); Samuel Badree 2/27 (4 overs)		Chris Gayle 38* (25); Akeal Hosein 1/24 (3 Overs)

St Kitts and Nevis Patriots won by 17 runs (DLS)
Warner Park, Basseterre
Umpires: Zahid Bassarath (WI) and Johan Cloete (SA)
Player of the match: Kieron Pollard (Barbados Tridents)

- St Kitts and Nevis Patriots won the toss and elected to field.

Match 17
19 August 2017
12:00 (D/N)
Scorecard

(home team) Guyana Amazon Warriors; 130/5 (20 overs)	v	Trinbago Knight Riders; 131/3 (15.5 overs)
Jason Mohammed 66 (58); Sunil Narine 1/11 (4 overs)		Brendon McCullum 65* (44); Sohail Tanvir 1/20 (3 overs)

Trinbago Knight Riders won by 7 wickets
Providence Stadium, Guyana
Umpires: Gregory Brathwaite(WI) and Nigel Duguid(SA)
Player of the match: Brendon McCullum (Trinbago Knight Riders)

- Trinbago Knight Riders won the toss and elected to field.

Match 18
19 August 2017
21:00 (D/N)
Scorecard

St Lucia Stars; 46/1 (8.1 Overs)	v	(home team) St Kitts & Nevis Patriots
Andre Fletcher 27* (28); Fabian Allen 1/24 (3.1 Overs)

No result
Warner Park, Basseterre
Umpires: Johan Cloete (SA) and Leslie Reifer (WI)

- St Kitts and Nevis Patriots won the toss and elected to field.
- Fabian Allen (St Kitts and Nevis Patriots) made his T20 debut.
- St Lucia Stars were eliminated as a result of this match.

Match 19
20 August 2017
18:00 (D/N)
Scorecard

Barbados Tridents; 159/4 (20 Overs)	v	(home team) Guyana Amazon Warriors; 160/6 (19.1 Overs)
Dwayne Smith 100 (70); Sohail Tanvir 3/40 (4 Overs)		Chadwick Walton 92 (57); Kieron Pollard 4/16 (4 Overs)

Guyana Amazon Warriors won by 4 wickets
Providence Stadium, Guyana
Umpires: Nigel Duguid (WI) and Langton Rusere (Zim)
Player of the match: Chadwick Walton (Guyana Amazon Warriors)

- Guyana Amazon Warriors won the toss and elected to field.
- Tion Webster and Damion Jacobs (Barbados Tridents) both made their T20 debuts.

Match 20
21 August 2017
18:00 (D/N)
Scorecard

(home team) St Kitts & Nevis Patriots; 208/3 (20 Overs)	v	Jamaica Tallawahs; 171/7 (20 Overs)
Chris Gayle 71* (55); Krishmar Santokie 1/23 (4 Overs)		Trevon Griffith 42 (32); Tabraiz Shamsi 3/35 (4 Overs)

St Kitts and Nevis Patriots won by 37 runs
Warner Park, Basseterre
Umpires: Zahid Bassarath (WI) and Leslie Reifer (WI)
Player of the match: Evin Lewis (St Kitts and Nevis Patriots)

- Jamaica Tallawahs won the toss and elected to field.

Match 21
22 August 2017
18:00 (D/N)
Scorecard

St Lucia Stars; 100/7 (20 Overs)	v	(home team) Guyana Amazon Warriors; 101/3 (14.4 Overs)
Jesse Ryder 29 (30); Rashid Khan 2/19 (4 Overs)		Jason Mohammed 42* (35); Jerome Taylor 1/13 (2 Overs)

Guyana Amazon Warriors won by 7 wickets
Providence Stadium, Guyana
Umpires: Gregory Brathwaite (WI) and Langton Rusere (Zim)
Player of the match: Sohail Tanvir (Guyana Amazon Warriors)

- Guyana Amazon Warriors won the toss and elected to field.

Match 22
23 August 2017
18:00 (D/N)
Scorecard

(home team) St Kitts & Nevis Patriots; 162/3 (13 Overs)	v	Trinbago Knight Riders; 88/2 (5.2 Overs)
Chris Gayle 93 (47); Sunil Narine 1/36 (3 Overs)		Brendon McCullum 40* (14); Ben Hilfenhaus 1/17 (2 Overs)

Trinbago Knight Riders won by 8 wickets (DLS)
Warner Park, Basseterre
Umpires: Zahid Bassarath (WI) Johan Cloete (SA)
Player of the match: Darren Bravo (Trinbago Knight Riders)

- Trinbago Knight Riders won the toss and elected to field.
- Bad Lights and rain delay during St Kitts and Nevis Patriots innings reduced the match to 13 Overs.
- Rain delay during Trinbago Knight Riders innings reduced the target to 88 runs in 6 Overs.

Match 23
25 August 2017
19:00 (D/N)
Scorecard

St Lucia Stars; 172/8 (20 Overs)	v	(home team) Jamaica Tallawahs; 176/4 (19 Overs)
Shane Watson 80 (45); Garey Mathurin 2/26 (4 Overs)		Kumar Sangakkara 74* (45); Rahkeem Cornwall 1/20 (4 Overs)

Jamaica Tallawahs won by 6 wickets
Sabina Park, Kingston, Jamaica
Umpires: Gregory Brathwaite (WI) and Nigel Duguid (WI)
Player of the match: Kumar Sangakkara (Jamaica Tallawahs)

- Jamaica Tallawahs won the toss and elected to field.

Match 24
26 August 2017
19:00 (D/N)
Scorecard

Trinbago Knight Riders; 208/6 (20 Overs)	v	(home team) Jamaica Tallawahs; 172/7 (20 Overs)
Brendon McCullum 91 (62); Rovman Powell 2/38 (4 Overs)		Kumar Sangakkara 53 (36); Javon Searles 3/28 (3 Overs)

Trinbago Knight Riders won by 36 runs
Sabina Park, Kingston, Jamaica
Umpires: Nigel Duguid (WI) and Langton Rusere (Zim)
Player of the match: Brendon McCullum (Trinbago Knight Riders)

- Jamaica Tallawahs won the toss and elected to field.

Match 25
29 August 2017
18:00 (D/N)
Scorecard

Guyana Amazon Warriors; 158/8 (20 Overs)	v	(home team) Barbados Tridents; 59 (13.4 Overs)
Jason Mohammed 42 (35); Akeal Hosein 2/19 (4 Overs)		Akeal Hosein 17 (25); Sohail Tanvir 5/3 (4 Overs)

Guyana Amazon Warriors won by 99 runs
Kensington Oval, Bridgetown, Barbados
Umpires: Johan Cloete (SA) and Leslie Reifer (WI)
Player of the match: Sohail Tanvir (Guyana Amazon Warriors)

- Barbados Tridents won the toss and elected to field.

Match 26
30 August 2017
17:00 (D/N)
Scorecard

(home team) Jamaica Tallawahs; 157/5 (20 Overs)	v	St Kitts & Nevis Patriots; 116 (17.5 Overs)
Kumar Sangakkara 69 (55); Sheldon Cottrell 2/38 (4 Overs)		Evin Lewis 40 (17); Oshane Thomas 3/31 (4 Overs)

Jamaica Tallawahs won by 41 runs
Sabina Park, Kingston, Jamaica
Umpires: Gregory Brathwaite (WI) and Langton Rusere (Zim)
Player of the match: Oshane Thomas (Jamaica Tallawahs)

- St Kitts and Nevis Patriots won the toss and elected to field.

Match 27
31 August 2017
20:00 (D/N)
Scorecard

(home team) Barbados Tridents; 195/4 (20 Overs)	v	St Lucia Stars; 166/4 (20 Overs)
Dwayne Smith 103* (65); Rahkeem Cornwall 2/30 (4 Overs)		Rahkeem Cornwall 78 (retired hurt) (44); Wahab Riaz 1/15 (4 Overs)

Barbados Tridents won by 29 runs
Kensington Oval, Bridgetown, Barbados
Umpires: Zahid Bassarath (WI) and Leslie Reifer (WI)
Player of the match: Dwayne Smith (Barbados Tridents)

- Barbados Tridents won the toss and elected to bat.

Match 28
1 September 2017
19:00 (D/N)
Scorecard

(home team) Jamaica Tallawahs; 149/7 (20 Overs)	v	Guyana Amazon Warriors; 150/1 (10.3 Overs)
Andre McCarthy 44 (35); Sohail Tanvir 2/27 (4 Overs)		Chadwick Walton 84* (40); Oshane Thomas 1/32 (2 Overs)

Guyana Amazon Warriors won by 9 wickets
Sabina Park, Kingston, Jamaica
Umpires: Gregory Brathwaite (WI) and Nigel Duguid (WI)
Player of the match: Chadwick Walton (Guyana Amazon Warriors)

- Jamaica Tallawahs won the toss and elected to bat.

Match 29
2 September 2017
21:00 (D/N)
Scorecard

(home team) Barbados Tridents; 136/9 (20 Overs)	v	Trinbago Knight Riders; 120 (18.2 Overs)
Wayne Parnell 44* (35); Shadab Khan 2/13 (4 Overs)		Javon Searles 29 (21); Wayne Parnell 3/31 (4 Overs)

Barbados Tridents won by 16 runs
Kensington Oval, Bridgetown, Barbados
Umpires: Zahid Bassarath (WI) and Johan Cloete (SA)
Player of the match: Wayne Parnell (Barbados Tridents)

- Trinbago Knight Riders won the toss and elected to field.

Match 30
3 September 2017
18:00 (D/N)
Scorecard

(home team) Barbados Tridents; 128/9 (20 Overs)	v	St Kitts & Nevis Patriots; 129/0 (7 Overs)
Tion Webster 32 (25); Carlos Brathwaite 4/15 (4 Overs)		Evin Lewis 97* (32)

St Kitts and Nevis Patriots won by 10 wickets
Kensington Oval, Bridgetown, Barbados
Umpires: Johan Cloete (SA) and Leslie Reifer (WI)
Player of the match: Evin Lewis (St Kitts and Nevis Patriots)

- St Kitts and Nevis Patriots won the toss and elected to field
- Evin Lewis scored the fastest fifty of CPL (19 balls).

== Playoffs ==
=== Qualifier 1 ===
Match 31
5 September 2017
15:00 (D/N)
Scorecard

St Kitts and Nevis Patriots; 149/7 (20 overs)	v	Trinbago Knight Riders; 111 (19.3 overs)
Chris Gayle 54* (51); Dwayne Bravo 4/38 (4 overs)		Darren Bravo 29 (33); Sheldon Cottrell 3/17 (4 overs)

St Kitts and Nevis Patriots won by 38 runs
Brian Lara Stadium, Tarouba, Trinidad
Umpires: Johan Cloete and Langton Rusere
Player of the match: Chris Gayle (St Kitts and Nevis Patriots)

- Trinbago Knight Riders won the toss and elected to field.

=== Eliminator ===
Match 32
6 September 2017
15:00 (D/N)
Scorecard

Jamaica Tallawahs; 168/8 (20 overs)	v	Guyana Amazon Warriors; 169/5 (17.5 overs)
Kumar Sangakkara 57* (38); Rashid Khan 3/32 (4 overs)		Luke Ronchi 70 (33); Mahmudullah 3/25 (4 overs)

Guyana Amazon Warriors won by 5 wickets
Brian Lara Stadium, Tarouba, Trinidad
Umpires: Gregory Brathwaite and Johan Cloete
Player of the match: Luke Ronchi (Guyana Amazon Warriors)

- Guyana Amazon Warriors won the toss and elected to field.

=== Qualifier 2 ===
Match 33
7 September 2017
15:00 (D/N)
Scorecard

Guyana Amazon Warriors; 159/6 (20 overs)	v	Trinbago Knight Riders; 160/4 (18 overs)
Gajanand Singh 39 (25); Ronsford Beaton 2/30 (3 overs)		Colin Munro 57* (51); Veerasammy Permaul 1/18 (1 over)

Trinbago Knight Riders won by 6 wickets
Brian Lara Stadium, Tarouba, Trinidad
Umpires: Gregory Brathwaite and Langton Rusere
Player of the match: Colin Munro (Trinbago Knight Riders)

- Trinbago Knight Riders won the toss and elected to field.

Final

Match 34
9 September 2017
21:00 (D/N)
Scorecard

St Kitts and Nevis Patriots; 135/6 (20 overs)	v	Trinbago Knight Riders; 136/7 (19 overs)
Carlos Brathwaite 30* (25); Kevon Cooper 2/12 (2 overs)		Kevon Cooper 29* (14); Sheldon Cottrell 2/21 (3 overs)

Trinbago Knight Riders won by 3 wickets
Brian Lara Stadium, Tarouba, Trinidad
Umpires: Gregory Brathwaite and Langton Rusere
Player of the match: Kevon Cooper (Trinbago Knight Riders)

- Trinbago Knight Riders won the toss and elected to field.

== Statistics ==
=== Most runs ===
Player	Team	Matches	Runs	High score
Chadwick Walton	Guyana Amazon Warriors	12	458	92
Kumar Sangakkara	Jamaica Tallawahs	11	379	74 not out
Chris Gayle	St Kitts & Nevis Patriots	11	375	93
Evin Lewis	St Kitts & Nevis Patriots	10	355	97 not out
Dwayne Smith	Barbados Tridents	10	349	103 not out

- Source: Cricinfo

=== Most wickets ===
Player	Team	Matches	Wickets	Best bowling
Sohail Tanvir	Guyana Amazon Warriors	12	17	5/3
Dwayne Bravo	Trinbago Knight Riders	13	16	4/38
Rayad Emrit	Guyana Amazon Warriors	12	15	4/35
Kesrick Williams	Jamaica Tallawahs	11	15	3/26
Rashid Khan	Guyana Amazon Warriors	12	14	3/15

- Source: Cricinfo
