= Kaskey =

Kaskey is a surname, which is at the same time a reduced form of McCaskey, an Americanized spelling of Kaske, and possibly altered from Koski. Notable people with the surname include:

- Harry Kaskey (1901–1992), American speed skater
- Matt Kaskey (born 1997), American football player
- Raymond Kaskey (born 1943), American sculptor
