= McCaskie =

McCaskie is a surname. Notable people with the surname include:

- Norman McCaskie (1911–1968), English cricketer
- Sonja McCaskie (1939–1963), British alpine skier
- Zachary McCaskie (born 1996), Barbadian cricketer

== See also ==
- McCaskey
