= Daburji =

- Village
- Location in Punjab, India Daburji (India)
- Coordinates: 31.394641°N 75.412621°E
- Country: India
- State: Punjab
- District: Kapurthala

Government
  - Type: Panchayati raj (India)
  - Body: Gram panchayat

Population (2011)
  - Total: 921
- Sex ratio 468/453♂/♀

Languages
  - Official: Punjabi
  - Other spoken: Hindi
- Time zone: UTC+5:30 (IST)
- PIN: 144601
- Telephone code: 01822
- ISO 3166 code: IN-PB
- Vehicle registration: PB-09
- Website: kapurthala.gov.in

Daburji is a village in Kapurthala district of Punjab State, India. It is located 3 kilometres (1.9 mi) from Kapurthala, which is both district and sub-district headquarters of Daburji. The village is administrated by a Sekhon, who is an elected representative.

== Demography ==
According to the report published by Census India in 2011, Daburji has a total number of 173 houses and population of 921 of which include 468 males and 453 females. Literacy rate of Daburji is 84.41%, higher than state average of 75.84%. The population of children under the age of 6 years is 87 which is 9.45% of total population of Daburji, and child sex ratio is approximately 933, higher than state average of 846.

== Caste ==
The village has schedule caste (SC) constitutes 51.00% of total population of the village and it doesn't have any Schedule Tribe (ST) population.

== Population data ==
Particulars	Total	Male	Female
Total No. of Houses	173	-	-
Population	921	468	453
Child (0-6)	87	45	42
Schedule Caste	470	245	225
Schedule Tribe	0	0	0
Literacy	84.41 %	90.07 %	78.59 %
Total Workers	319	247	72
Main Worker	298	0	0
Marginal Worker	21	16	5

== Air travel connectivity ==
The closest airport to the village is Sri Guru Ram Dass Jee International Airport.
