= 2019–20 Regional Super50 =

Cricket tournament

- Dates: 6 November – 1 December 2019
- Administrator: CWI
- Cricket format: List A (50 overs)
- Tournament format(s): Group stage, finals
- Champions: West Indies Emerging Team (1st title)
- Participants: 10
- Matches: 43
- Most runs: Kieran Powell (524)
- Most wickets: Sheeno Berridge (23)

The 2019–20 Regional Super50 was the 46th edition of the Regional Super50, the domestic limited-overs cricket competition for the countries of the Cricket West Indies (CWI). The tournament started on 6 November 2019, with the final taking place on 1 December 2019. The tournament featured the six regular teams of West Indian domestic cricket (Barbados, Guyana, Jamaica, the Leeward Islands, Trinidad and Tobago, and the Windward Islands), the Combined Campuses and Colleges team and the West Indies Emerging Team. The national teams of the United States and Canada also took part. Combined Campuses and Colleges were the defending champions.

Following the conclusion of the group stage matches, Barbados, the Leeward Islands, Trinidad and Tobago and the West Indies Emerging Team had progressed to the semi-finals. In the rain-affected first semi-final, the West Indies Emerging Team beat Barbados by three wickets. The second semi-final saw the Leeward Islands beat Trinidad and Tobago by four wickets to advance to the final. The West Indies Emerging Team won the tournament, beating the Leeward Islands by 205 runs in the final.

== Squads ==
Barbados	Canada	(Cricket West Indies) Combined Campuses	Guyana	Jamaica
Jonathan Carter (c); Joshua Bishop; Leniko Boucher; Miguel Cummins; Chemar Holder; Nicholas Kirton; Kyle Mayers; Zachary McCaskie; Ashley Nurse; Kjorn Ottley; Roshon Primus; Javon Searles; Shamar Springer; Tevyn Walcott	Kanwarpal Tathgur (c); Shreyas Movva (vc); Shahid Ahmadzai; Arslan Khan; Nitish Kumar; Kanwar Mann; Jeet Mehta; Yax Patel; Rayyan Pathan; Kaleem Sana; Harrobindeep Sekhon; Harmandeep Singh; Harsh Thaker; Nauman Zafar	Carlos Brathwaite (c); Jonathan Drakes; Sadique Henry; Akeem Jordan; Larry Joseph; Kavesh Kantasingh; Abhijai Mansingh; Odain McCatty; Romaine Morrison; Paul Palmer; Akshaya Persaud; Jalarnie Seales; Ojay Shields	Leon Johnson (c); Christopher Barnwell; Ronsford Beaton; Anthony Bramble; Tagenarine Chanderpaul; Jonathan Foo; Chandrapaul Hemraj; Ramaal Lewis; Gudakesh Motie; Veerasammy Permaul; Clinton Pestano; Raymon Reifer; Kemol Savory; Nial Smith	Rovman Powell (c); Jermaine Blackwood; Nkruma Bonner; Dennis Bulli; Assad Fudadin; Nicholson Gordon; Derval Green; Christopher Lamont; Andre McCarthy; Jamie Merchant; Marquino Mindley; Denis Smith; Aldane Thomas; Oshane Thomas
Leeward Islands	Trinidad and Tobago	United States	(Cricket West Indies) West Indies Emerging Team	Windward Islands
Devon Thomas (c); Justin Athanaze; Deran Benta; Shane Burton; Rahkeem Cornwall; Elroy Francis; Nino Henry; Kofi James; Alzarri Joseph; Orlando Peters; Kadeem Phillip; Javier Spencer; Hayden Walsh Jr.; Tyrone Williams	Imran Khan (c); Yannick Ottley (vc); Darren Bravo; Kyle Hope; Akeal Hosein; Jon-Russ Jaggesar; Steven Katwaroo; Jason Mohammed; Anderson Phillip; Isaiah Rajah; Keagan Simmons; Odean Smith; Jeremy Solozano; Tion Webster	Saurabh Netravalkar (c); Steven Taylor (vc); Karima Gore; Ian Holland; Akshay Homraj; Elmore Hutchinson; Aaron Jones; Nosthush Kenjige; Xavier Marshall; Monank Patel; Nisarg Patel; Sagar Patel; Timil Patel; Jasdeep Singh; Cameron Stevenson; Rusty Theron	Yannic Cariah (c); Kimani Melius (vc); Camarie Boyce; Roland Cato; Joshua Da Silva; Dominic Drakes; Justin Greaves; Keon Harding; Leonardo Julien; Jermaine Levy; Ashmead Nedd; Gidron Pope; Jayden Seales; Kevin Sinclair	Kirk Edwards (c); Kavem Hodge (vc); Alick Athanaze; Keron Cottoy; Dillon Douglas; Larry Edwards; Ryan John; Ray Jordan; Shermon Lewis; Desron Maloney; Shane Shillingford; Devon Smith; Emmanuel Stewart; Bhaskar Yadram

== Points tables ==
Group A

Team	Pld	W	L	T	N/R	Pts	NRR
Barbados	8	6	2	0	0	24	+1.126
Leeward Islands	8	6	2	0	0	24	+0.707
Jamaica	8	4	4	0	0	16	+0.146
Canada	8	2	6	0	0	8	–0.613
Combined Campuses and Colleges	8	2	6	0	0	8	–1.262

Group B

Team	Pld	W	L	T	N/R	Pts	NRR
Trinidad and Tobago	8	7	1	0	0	28	+0.930
West Indies Emerging Team	8	4	3	0	1	18	–0.200
Guyana	8	4	4	0	0	16	–0.041
Windward Islands	8	2	5	0	1	10	–0.385
United States	8	2	6	0	0	8	–0.271

== Fixtures ==
=== Group A ===
6 November 2019
Scorecard

Leeward Islands; 292/7 (50 overs)	v	Combined Campuses and Colleges; 94 (31.3 overs)
Devon Thomas 105 (93); Larry Joseph 2/26 (10 overs)		Jalarnie Seales 39* (66); Rahkeem Cornwall 4/21 (5.3 overs)

Leeward Islands won by 198 runs
Warner Park, Saint Kitts
Umpires: Danesh Ramdhanie and Deighton Butler
Player of the match: Devon Thomas (Leeward Islands)

- Combined Campuses and Colleges won the toss and elected to field.
- Akshaya Persaud, Romaine Morrison, Odain McCatty and Jalarnie Seales (Combined Campuses and Colleges) all made their List A debuts.
- This was the Leeward Islands' second-largest win, by runs, in the history of the tournament.

7 November 2019
Scorecard

Barbados; 265 (50 overs)	v	Jamaica; 190 (39.5 overs)
Nicholas Kirton 55 (82); Andre McCarthy 4/41 (10 overs)		Andre McCarthy 95 (83); Ashley Nurse 4/26 (8.5 overs)

Barbados won by 75 runs
Warner Park, Saint Kitts
Umpires: Nigel Duguid and Shannon Crawford
Player of the match: Andre McCarthy (Jamaica)

- Barbados won the toss and elected to bat.

8 November 2019
Scorecard

Leeward Islands; 257 (49.1 overs)	v	Canada; 187 (42.4 overs)
Rahkeem Cornwall 92 (75); Harsh Thaker 3/24 (7 overs)		Kanwarpal Tathgur 49 (68); Sheeno Berridge 4/36 (10 overs)

Leeward Islands won by 70 runs
Warner Park, Saint Kitts
Umpires: Nigel Duguid and Lyndon Rajkumar
Player of the match: Rahkeem Cornwall (Leeward Islands)

- Leeward Islands won the toss and elected to bat.
- Jeet Mehta, Arslan Khan, Kanwarpal Tathgur, Shreyas Movva, Kanwar Mann, Shahid Ahmadzai and Yax Patel (Canada) all made their List A debuts.

9 November 2019
Scorecard

Barbados; 172 (43.4 overs)	v	Combined Campuses and Colleges; 173/6 (47 overs)
Nicholas Kirton 42 (56); Akeem Jordan 4/21 (8.4 overs)		Akshaya Persaud 51* (79); Ashley Nurse 2/29 (10 overs)

Combined Campuses and Colleges won by 4 wickets
Warner Park, Saint Kitts
Umpires: Danesh Ramdhanie and Deighton Butler
Player of the match: Akeem Jordan (Combined Campuses and Colleges)

- Barbados won the toss and elected to bat.
- Abhijai Mansingh and Sadique Henry (Combined Campuses and Colleges) both made their List A debuts.

10 November 2019
Scorecard

Jamaica; 262/9 (50 overs)	v	Leeward Islands; 264/2 (45.4 overs)
Assad Fudadin 107 (133); Jeremiah Louis 2/58 (10 overs)		Kieran Powell 121* (124); Andre McCarthy 1/39 (10 overs)

Leeward Islands won by 8 wickets
Conaree Sports Club, Saint Kitts
Umpires: Nigel Duguid and Danesh Ramdhanie
Player of the match: Kieran Powell (Leeward Islands)

- Leeward Islands won the toss and elected to field.

11 November 2019
Scorecard

Canada; 161 (48.1 overs)	v	Barbados; 162/1 (30 overs)
Arslan Khan 76 (128); Chemar Holder 3/32 (9 overs)		Kjorn Ottley 70* (84); Shahid Ahmadzai 1/21 (7 overs)

Barbados won by 9 wickets
Conaree Sports Club, Saint Kitts
Umpires: Shannon Crawford and Deighton Butler
Player of the match: Kjorn Ottley (Barbados)

- Canada won the toss and elected to bat.
- Harrobindeep Sekhon, Harmandeep Singh and Nauman Zafar (Canada) all made their List A debuts.

12 November 2019
Scorecard

Jamaica; 330/8 (50 overs)	v	Combined Campuses and Colleges; 233 (45.2 overs)
Assad Fudadin 92 (123); Akeem Jordan 3/72 (10 overs)		Romaine Morrison 96 (85); Oshane Thomas 3/25 (8.2 overs)

Jamaica won by 97 runs
Warner Park, Saint Kitts
Umpires: Nigel Duguid and Deighton Butler
Player of the match: Andre McCarthy (Jamaica)

- Jamaica won the toss and elected to bat.
- Dennis Bulli (Jamaica) made his List A debut.

13 November 2019
Scorecard

Barbados; 255 (50 overs)	v	Leeward Islands; 223 (47.3 overs)
Kyle Mayers 113 (110); Joshua Bishop 3/31 (10 overs)		Devon Thomas 50 (85); Sheeno Berridge 4/38 (10 overs)

Barbados won by 32 runs
Warner Park, Saint Kitts
Umpires: Danesh Ramdhanie and Lyndon Rajkumar
Player of the match: Kyle Mayers (Barbados)

- Barbados won the toss and elected to bat.

14 November 2019
Scorecard

Canada; 249 (49.1 overs)	v	Combined Campuses and Colleges; 149 (35.1 overs)
Nitish Kumar 102 (102); Akeem Jordan 5/33 (9 overs)		Jonathan Drakes 40 (53); Kaleem Sana 3/37 (8.1 overs)

Canada won by 100 runs
Conaree Sports Club, Saint Kitts
Umpires: Nigel Duguid and Shannon Crawford
Player of the match: Nitish Kumar (Canada)

- Combined Campuses and Colleges won the toss and elected to field.

15 November 2019
Scorecard

Leeward Islands; 184 (46.2 overs)	v	Barbados; 185/1 (30.2 overs)
Kieran Powell 88 (123); Roshon Primus 4/47 (7.2 overs)		Jonathan Carter 69* (58); Terrence Warde 1/52 (10 overs)

Barbados won by 9 wickets
Conaree Sports Club, Saint Kitts
Umpires: Danesh Ramdhanie and Deighton Butler
Player of the match: Leniko Boucher (Barbados)

- Barbados won the toss and elected to field.
- Colin Archibald (Leeward Islands) made his List A debut.

16 November 2019
Scorecard

Canada; 243/6 (50 overs)	v	Jamaica; 246/6 (43.3 overs)
Nitish Kumar 65 (62); Dennis Bulli 2/47 (10 overs)		Rovman Powell 100* (67); Kanwar Mann 2/33 (9 overs)

Jamaica won by 4 wickets
Warner Park, Saint Kitts
Umpires: Shannon Crawford and Danesh Ramdhanie
Player of the match: Rovman Powell (Jamaica)

- Canada won the toss and elected to bat.

17 November 2019
Scorecard

Combined Campuses and Colleges; 207/9 (50 overs)	v	Barbados; 211/6 (45.2 overs)
Akshaya Persaud 55 (91); Miguel Cummins 4/29 (8 overs)		Kjorn Ottley 101* (127); Carlos Brathwaite 3/37 (8 overs)

Barbados won by 4 wickets
Warner Park, Saint Kitts
Umpires: Lyndon Rajkumar and Deighton Butler
Player of the match: Kjorn Ottley (Barbados)

- Combined Campuses and Colleges won the toss and elected to bat.
- Jervin Benjamin (Combined Campuses and Colleges) made his List A debut.
- Kjorn Ottley (Barbados) scored his first century in List A cricket.

18 November 2019
Scorecard

Canada; 244/9 (50 overs)	v	Jamaica; 246/7 (47.5 overs)
Harsh Thaker 60 (85); Dennis Bulli 4/40 (10 overs)		Nkruma Bonner 73* (79); Rayyan Pathan 2/33 (7 overs)

Jamaica won by 3 wickets
Conaree Sports Club, Saint Kitts
Umpires: Shannon Crawford and Danesh Ramdhanie
Player of the match: Dennis Bulli (Jamaica)

- Canada won the toss and elected to bat.

19 November 2019
Scorecard

Combined Campuses and Colleges; 190/9 (50 overs)	v	Leeward Islands; 191/4 (41 overs)
Paul Palmer 50 (82); Quinton Boatswain 2/18 (7 overs)		Devon Thomas 78* (96); Carlos Brathwaite 2/35 (8 overs)

Leeward Islands won by 6 wickets
Conaree Sports Club, Saint Kitts
Umpires: Nigel Duguid and Deighton Butler
Player of the match: Devon Thomas (Leeward Islands)

- Leeward Islands won the toss and elected to field.
- Devon Thomas and Jahmar Hamilton made an unbeaten 159-run partnership, a record for any wicket for Leeward Islands in a List A match and a record for a fifth-wicket stand in the tournament's history.

20 November 2019
Scorecard

Jamaica; 331/9 (50 overs)	v	Barbados; 305/8 (50 overs)
Nkrumah Bonner 112 (111); Kyle Mayers 2/26 (7 overs)		Jonathan Carter 97 (90); Jamie Merchant 4/35 (10 overs)

Jamaica won by 26 runs
Conaree Sports Club, Saint Kitts
Umpires: Nigel Duguid and Lyndon Rajkumar
Player of the match: Jamie Merchant (Jamaica)

- Barbados won the toss and elected to field.

21 November 2019
Scorecard

Leeward Islands; 232/9 (50 overs)	v	Canada; 183 (44 overs)
Devon Thomas 53 (51); Rayyan Pathan 4/53 (10 overs)		Rayyan Pathan 44 (29); Colin Archibald 3/36 (8 overs)

Leeward Islands won by 49 runs
Warner Park, Saint Kitts
Umpires: Danesh Ramdhanie and Deighton Butler
Player of the match: Quinton Boatswain (Leeward Islands)

- Leeward Islands won the toss and elected to bat.

22 November 2019
Scorecard

Jamaica; 272 (49.4 overs)	v	Combined Campuses and Colleges; 274/8 (49.4 overs)
Andre McCarthy 63 (64); Larry Joseph 3/61 (10 overs)		Paul Palmer 59 (70); Oshane Thomas 2/55 (10 overs)

Combined Campuses and Colleges won by 2 wickets
Warner Park, Saint Kitts
Umpires: Deighton Butler and Zahid Bassarath
Player of the match: Paul Palmer (Combined Campuses and Colleges)

- Jamaica won the toss and elected to bat.
- Michail Powell (Combined Campuses and Colleges) made his List A debut.

23 November 2019
Scorecard

Canada; 154 (43.5 overs)	v	Barbados; 156/3 (22.3 overs)
Kanwar Mann 44 (65); Miguel Cummins 3/19 (10 overs)		Kjorn Ottley 50 (38); Nitish Kumar 2/31 (4 overs)

Barbados won by 7 wickets
Warner Park, Saint Kitts
Umpires: Nigel Duguid and Danesh Ramdhanie
Player of the match: Miguel Cummins (Barbados)

- Canada won the toss and elected to bat.
- Zachary McCaskie (Barbados) made his List A debut.

24 November 2019
Scorecard

Leeward Islands; 255/8 (50 overs)	v	Jamaica; 242 (28.3 overs)
Kieran Powell 105 (125); Oshane Thomas 3/59 (8 overs)		Rovman Powell 106 (40); Quinton Boatswain 4/85 (10 overs)

Leeward Islands won by 13 runs
Conaree Sports Club, Saint Kitts
Umpires: Nigel Duguid and Deighton Butler
Player of the match: Rovman Powell (Jamaica)

- Jamaica won the toss and elected to field.

25 November 2019
Scorecard

Canada; 252 (50 overs)	v	Combined Campuses and Colleges; 201 (44.2 overs)
Harsh Thaker 68* (67); Larry Joseph 3/38 (10 overs)		Paul Palmer 105 (123); Kaleem Sana 4/24 (8.2 overs)

Canada won by 51 runs
Conaree Sports Club, Saint Kitts
Umpires: Danesh Ramdhanie and Zahid Bassarath
Player of the match: Harsh Thaker (Canada)

- Combined Campuses and Colleges won the toss and elected to field.
- Paul Palmer (Combined Campuses and Colleges) scored his first century in List A cricket.

=== Group B ===
7 November 2019
Scorecard

West Indies Emerging Team; 185/8 (50 overs)	v	Guyana; 189/8 (50 overs)
Justin Greaves 55 (89); Veerasammy Permaul 3/34 (10 overs)		Kemol Savory 71* (146); Keon Harding 4/35 (10 overs)

Guyana won by 2 wickets
Brian Lara Stadium, Trinidad
Umpires: Christopher Taylor and Carl Tuckett
Player of the match: Kemol Savory (Guyana)

- Guyana won the toss and elected to field.
- Kemol Savory (Guyana), Joshua Da Silva, Kevin Sinclair and Camarie Boyce (West Indies Emerging Team) all made their List A debuts.

7 November 2019
Scorecard

Windward Islands; 238/8 (50 overs)	v	Trinidad and Tobago; 239/2 (42.5 overs)
Kavem Hodge 57 (105); Imran Khan 2/28 (10 overs)		Darren Bravo 115* (127); Shane Shillingford 1/28 (8 overs)

Trinidad and Tobago won by 8 wickets
Queen's Park Oval, Trinidad
Umpires: Leslie Reifer and Jonathan Blades
Player of the match: Darren Bravo (Trinidad and Tobago)

- Trinidad and Tobago won the toss and elected to field.
- Anderson Phillip (Trinidad and Tobago), Desron Maloney and Ray Jordan (Windward Islands) all made their List A debuts.
- Darren Bravo and Jeremy Solozano made an unbeaten 226-run partnership, a record for any wicket for Trinidad and Tobago in a List A match and in the tournament's history.

9 November 2019
Scorecard

United States; 109 (19.4 overs)	v	West Indies Emerging Team; 110/4 (17.4 overs)
Nisarg Patel 32 (27); Ashmead Nedd 3/12 (4 overs)		Jonathan Blades 62* (44); Karima Gore 2/29 (4 overs)

West Indies Emerging Team Emerging won by 6 wickets
Brian Lara Stadium, Trinidad
Umpires: Jonathan Blades and Verdayne Smith
Player of the match: Joshua Da Silva (West Indies Emerging Team)

- West Indies Emerging Team won the toss and elected to field.
- Ashmead Nedd (West Indies Emerging Team) and Akshay Homraj (United States) both made their List A debuts.

9 November 2019
Scorecard

Guyana; 187/9 (43 overs)	v	Trinidad and Tobago; 191/4 (36 overs)
Jonathan Foo 36 (31); Anderson Phillip 4/44 (9 overs)		Tion Webster 87 (60); Veerasammy Permaul 2/33 (8 overs)

Trinidad and Tobago won by 6 wickets (DLS method)
Queen's Park Oval, Trinidad
Umpires: Carl Tuckett and Gregory Brathwaite
Player of the match: Tion Webster (Trinidad and Tobago)

- Trinidad and Tobago won the toss and elected to field.

11 November 2019
Scorecard

West Indies Emerging Team; 261/3 (50 overs)	v	Windward Islands; 154 (38 overs)
Joshua Da Silva 103* (124); Kavem Hodge 1/36 (8 overs)		Shane Shillingford 41* (55); Keon Harding 4/45 (9 overs)

West Indies Emerging Team won by 107 runs
Brian Lara Stadium, Trinidad
Umpires: Leslie Reifer and Verdayne Smith
Player of the match: Joshua Da Silva (West Indies Emerging Team)

- West Indies Emerging Team won the toss and elected to bat.
- Joshua Da Silva (West Indies Emerging Team) scored his first century in List A cricket.

11 November 2019
Scorecard

Guyana; 226 (50 overs)	v	United States; 213/9 (50 overs)
Christopher Barnwell 80 (63); Karima Gore 3/38 (8 overs)		Monank Patel 43 (79); Raymon Reifer 5/35 (9 overs)

Guyana won by 13 runs
Queen's Park Oval, Trinidad
Umpires: Christopher Taylor and Gregory Brathwaite
Player of the match: Raymon Reifer (Guyana)

- United States won the toss and elected to field.
- Nial Smith (Guyana) and Sagar Patel (United States) both made their List A debuts.
- Veerasammy Permaul (Guyana) took his 100th wicket in List A cricket.

13 November 2019
Scorecard

West Indies Emerging Team; 243 (50 overs)	v	Trinidad and Tobago; 233/9 (50 overs)
Justin Greaves 80 (88); Keon Harding 4/59 (10 overs)		Yannick Ottley 71 (79); Jon-Russ Jaggesar 3/33 (10 overs)

West Indies Emerging Team won by 10 runs
Queen's Park Oval, Trinidad
Umpires: Chris Wright and Gregory Brathwaite
Player of the match: Justin Greaves (West Indies Emerging Team)

- Trinidad and Tobago won the toss and elected to field.

13 November 2019
Scorecard

Windward Islands; 225/9 (50 overs)	v	United States; 182 (45.5 overs)
Keron Cottoy 43* (43); Jasdeep Singh 2/24 (8 overs)		Steven Taylor 62 (99); Keron Cottoy 5/37 (8 overs)

Windward Islands won by 43 runs
Brian Lara Stadium, Trinidad
Umpires: Leslie Reifer and Christopher Taylor
Player of the match: Keron Cottoy (Windward Islands)

- Windward Islands won the toss and elected to bat.

15 November 2019
Scorecard

Windward Islands; 258/5 (42 overs)	v	Guyana; 260/6 (41.2 overs)
Devon Smith 93 (94); Veerasammy Permaul 2/34 (9 overs)		Christopher Barnwell 89 (84); Keron Cottoy 1/24 (3 overs)

Guyana won by 4 wickets
Queen's Park Oval, Trinidad
Umpires: Leslie Reifer and Gregory Brathwaite
Player of the match: Christopher Barnwell (Guyana)

- Guyana won the toss and elected to field.
- The match was reduced to 42 overs per side due to rain.

15 November 2019
Scorecard

Trinidad and Tobago; 244/4 (30 overs)	v	United States; 201/7 (30 overs)
Jason Mohammed 101* (62); Karima Gore 2/21 (6 overs)		Xavier Marshall 53 (58); Imran Khan 3/38 (6 overs)

Trinidad and Tobago won by 43 runs
Brian Lara Stadium, Trinidad
Umpires: Verdayne Smith and Carl Tuckett
Player of the match: Jason Mohammed (Trinidad and Tobago)

- Trinidad and Tobago won the toss and elected to bat.
- The match was reduced to 30 overs per side due to rain.

17 November 2019
Scorecard

Trinidad and Tobago; 179 (28.3 overs)	v	Windward Islands; 177 (28.3 overs)
Jason Mohammed 60 (53); Bhaskar Yadram 4/22 (6 overs)		Kavem Hodge 46 (55); Yannick Ottley 5/36 (5.3 overs)

Trinidad and Tobago won by 2 runs
Brian Lara Stadium, Trinidad
Umpires: Jonathan Blades and Gregory Brathwaite
Player of the match: Yannick Ottley (Trinidad and Tobago)

- Windward Islands won the toss and elected to field.
- The match was reduced to 30 overs per side due to rain.

17 November 2019
Scorecard

West Indies Emerging Team; 167/8 (30 overs)	v	Guyana; 178/8 (30 overs)
Justin Greaves 53 (62); Chandrapaul Hemraj 3/18 (3 overs)		Jonathan Foo 67 (54); Jermaine Levy 3/40 (6 overs)

West Indies Emerging Team won by 1 run (DLS method)
Queen's Park Oval, Trinidad
Umpires: Leslie Reifer and Verdayne Smith
Player of the match: Jermaine Levy (West Indies Emerging Team)

- Guyana won the toss and elected to field.
- Guyana were set a revised target of 180 runs from 30 overs due to rain.

19 November 2019
Scorecard

Guyana; 294/9 (50 overs)	v	Windward Islands; 272/8 (50 overs)
Chandrapaul Hemraj 100 (116); Ryan John 4/57 (7 overs)		Kavem Hodge 123 (145); Ronsford Beaton 2/39 (8 overs)

Guyana won by 22 runs
Queen's Park Oval, Trinidad
Umpires: Jonathan Blades and Verdayne Smith
Player of the match: Chandrapaul Hemraj (Guyana)

- Windward Islands won the toss and elected to field.
- Kavem Hodge (Windward Islands) scored his first century in List A cricket.
- Chandrapaul Hemraj and Tagenarine Chanderpaul made a 171-run partnership, a record for any wicket for Guyana in a List A match.
- Kavem Hodge and Alick Athanaze made a 156-run partnership, a record for any wicket for Windward Islands in a List A match.

19 November 2019
Scorecard

United States; 216/9 (50 overs)	v	West Indies Emerging Team; 173 (44.2 overs)
Timil Patel 35 (60); Yannic Cariah 2/35 (10 overs)		Kevin Sinclair 44 (46); Nosthush Kenjige 3/34 (10 overs)

United States won by 43 runs
Brian Lara Stadium, Trinidad
Umpires: Leslie Reifer and Gregory Brathwaite
Player of the match: Cameron Stevenson (United States)

- United States won the toss and elected to bat.

21 November 2019
Scorecard

United States; 176/9 (45 overs)	v	Trinidad and Tobago; 177/3 (41.5 overs)
Karima Gore 40 (70); Anderson Phillip 2/44 (9 overs)		Darren Bravo 80* (112); Steven Taylor 1/24 (9 overs)

Trinidad and Tobago won by 7 wickets
Queen's Park Oval, Trinidad
Umpires: Christopher Taylor and Carl Tuckett
Player of the match: Darren Bravo (Trinidad and Tobago)

- United States won the toss and elected to bat.

21 November 2019
Scorecard

Windward Islands	v	West Indies Emerging Team

Match abandoned
Brian Lara Stadium, Trinidad
Umpires: Leslie Reifer and Verdayne Smith

- No toss.
- No play was possible due to rain.

23 November 2019
Scorecard

Windward Islands; 264 (49.2 overs)	v	United States; 241 (45.5 overs)
Devon Smith 45 (50); Rusty Theron 3/48 (9.2 overs)		Xavier Marshall 79 (94); Keron Cottoy 3/38 (9 overs)

Windward Islands won by 11 runs (DLS method)
Brian Lara Stadium, Trinidad
Umpires: Patrick Gustard and Jonathan Blades
Player of the match: Keron Cottoy (Windward Islands)

- Windward Islands won the toss and elected to bat.
- Dillon Douglas (Windward Islands) made his List A debut.

23 November 2019
Scorecard

Guyana; 218/8 (46 overs)	v	Trinidad and Tobago; 220/4 (44.3 overs)
Jonathan Foo 97* (92); Imran Khan 3/23 (10 overs)		Darren Bravo 98 (119); Veerasammy Permaul 2/49 (9 overs)

Trinidad and Tobago won by 6 wickets
Queen's Park Oval, Trinidad
Umpires: Christopher Taylor and Gregory Brathwaite

- Trinidad and Tobago won the toss and elected to field.
- Ronaldo Alimohamed (Guyana) made his List A debut.

25 November 2019
Scorecard

West Indies Emerging Team; 78 (27.1 overs)	v	Trinidad and Tobago; 79/0 (17.3 overs)
Justin Greaves 43 (69); Imran Khan 3/19 (8 overs)		Jeremy Solozano 43* (59)

Trinidad and Tobago won by 10 wickets
Queen's Park Oval, Trinidad
Umpires: Jonathan Blades and Jacqueline Williams
Player of the match: Anderson Phillip (Trinidad and Tobago)

- West Indies Emerging Team won the toss and elected to bat.

25 November 2019
Scorecard

Guyana; 230/5 (41 overs)	v	United States; 213/7 (36 overs)
Monank Patel 85 (105); Ramaal Lewis 3/24 (4 overs)		Christopher Barnwell 54 (47); Saurabh Netravalkar 3/42 (7 overs)

United States won by 8 runs (DLS method)
Brian Lara Stadium, Trinidad
Umpires: Christopher Taylor and Gregory Brathwaite
Player of the match: Monank Patel (United States)

- United States won the toss and elected to bat.

== Finals ==
1st Semi-final
28 November 2019
Scorecard

Barbados; 119 (31.3 overs)	v	West Indies Emerging Team; 112/7 (38.4 overs)
Zachary McCaskie 40 (62); Ashmead Nedd 4/29 (9.3 overs)		Joshua Da Silva 27 (66); Ashley Nurse 3/35 (9 overs)

West Indies Emerging Team won by 3 wickets (DLS method)
Queen's Park Oval, Trinidad
Umpires: Patrick Gustard and Zahid Bassarath
Player of the match: Ashmead Nedd (West Indies Emerging Team)

- West Indies Emerging Team won the toss and elected to field.

2nd Semi-final
29 November 2019
Scorecard

Trinidad and Tobago; 268/8 (50 overs)	v	Leeward Islands; 269/6 (49.3 overs)
Tion Webster 91 (120); Sheeno Berridge 4/58 (10 overs)		Jahmar Hamilton 78* (34); Jon-Russ Jaggesar 2/49 (10 overs)

Leeward Islands won by 4 wickets
Queen's Park Oval, Trinidad
Umpires: Nigel Duguid and Gregory Brathwaite
Player of the match: Jahmar Hamilton (Leeward Islands)

- Leeward Islands won the toss and elected to field.

Final
1 December 2019
Scorecard

West Indies Emerging Team; 293/7 (50 overs)	v	Leeward Islands; 88 (26.5 overs)
Leonardo Julien 83 (85); Quinton Boatswain 2/59 (10 overs); Sheeno Berridge 2/59 (10 overs)		Amir Jangoo 20 (43); Kevin Sinclair 4/20 (5.5 overs)

West Indies Emerging Team won by 205 runs
Queen's Park Oval, Trinidad
Umpires: Nigel Duguid and Gregory Brathwaite
Player of the match: Yannic Cariah (West Indies Emerging Team)

- Leeward Islands won the toss and elected to field.
