= McCatty =

McCatty is a surname. Notable people with the surname include:

- Grace McCatty (born 1989), English footballer
- Odain McCatty (born 1996), Jamaican cricketer
- Steve McCatty (born 1954), American baseball player and coach
