= Dillon Douglas =

West Indian cricketer (born 1998)

Personal information
- Full name: Dillon Douglas
- Born: 17 September 1998 (age 28); Saint Vincent
- Batting: Right handed

Domestic team information
- Years: Team
- 2019–present: Windward Islands
- 2025: Windward Islands Infernos

Career statistics
| Competition | List A |
|---|---|
| Matches | 8 |
| Runs scored | 207 |
| Batting average | 25.87 |
| 100s/50s | 0/1 |
| Top score | 90 |
| Catches/stumpings | 9/0 |
- Source: Cricinfo, 20 April 2025

Dillon Douglas (born 17 September 1998) is a West Indian cricketer. He made his List A debut on 23 November 2019, for the Windward Islands in the 2019–20 Regional Super50 tournament.
