= Michail Powell =

West Indian cricketer (born 1991)

Personal information
- Full name: Michail Powell
- Born: 11 June 1991 (age 35); Jamaica
- Source: Cricinfo, 22 November 2019

Michail Powell (born 11 June 1991) is a Jamaican cricketer. He made his List A debut on 22 November 2019, for Combined Campuses and Colleges in the 2019–20 Regional Super50 tournament.
