= Sekhon =

Surname in India and Pakistan

Sekhon is a surname and a Jat clan in the Punjab region.

Notable people with the surname, who may or may not be associated with the clan, include:

- Nirmal Jit Singh Sekhon, Indian Air Force officer
- Sahaij Sekhon, Indian basketball player
- Sant Singh Sekhon, Indian writer
- Janmeja Singh Sekhon, Indian politician
- Kathleen Sekhon, American educator and politician
- Harrobindeep Sekhon, Canadian cricketer
- Jasjeet S. Sekhon, Canadian statistician
- Ricky Sekhon, English actor
- Gurcharan Singh Sekhon, Singaporean Army officer
- Harinder Singh Sekhon, Malaysian cricketer
- Shweta Sekhon, Malaysian supermodel

== Popular culture ==
- DSP Dilsher Sekhon of Singham Khurd in the Punjabi language film Singham, who sets out to end the drug addiction among the youth of Punjab.
