= Yax Patel =

Canadian cricketer (born 1999)

Personal information
- Full name: Yax Rakesh Patel
- Born: 29 May 1999 (age 27); Bardoli, India
- Batting: Left-handed
- Bowling: Left-arm orthodox spin
- Role: All-rounder

International information
- National side: Canada

Domestic team information
- Years: Team
- 2019-present: Canada
- 2019: Montreal Tigers

Career statistics
Competition	List A
Matches	5
Runs scored	10
Batting average	3.33
100s/50s	0/0
Top score	9*
Balls bowled	120
Wickets	3
Bowling average	31.66
5 wickets in innings	0
10 wickets in match	0
Best bowling	2/10
Catches/stumpings	3/0
- Source: Cricinfo, 21 January 2021

Yax Patel (born 29 May 1999) is a Canadian cricketer. In October 2019, he was named in Canada's squad for the 2019–20 Regional Super50 tournament in the West Indies. He made his List A debut on 8 November 2019, for Canada against the Leeward Islands, in the Regional Super50 tournament.
