= Jalarnie Seales =

West Indian cricketer (born 1997)

Personal information
- Born: 6 October 1997 (age 29); Trinidad
- Batting: Left-handed
- Bowling: Right-arm fast
- Relatives: Jayden Seales (cousin)

Career statistics
Competition	List A
Matches	6
Runs scored	119
Batting average	19.83
100s/50s	0/0
Top score	39
Balls bowled	286
Wickets	8
Bowling average	41.50
5 wickets in innings	0
10 wickets in match	0
Best bowling	3/62
Catches/stumpings	2/–
- Source: Cricinfo, 31 November 2019

Jalarnie Seales (born 6 October 1997) is a West Indian cricketer. He made his List A debut on 6 November 2019, for Combined Campuses and Colleges in the 2019–20 Regional Super50 tournament.
