= Sadique Henry =

West Indian cricketer (born 1994)

Personal information
- Full name: Sadique Henry
- Born: 3 October 1994 (age 32); Jamaica
- Source: Cricinfo, 10 November 2019

Sadique Henry (born 3 October 1994) is a Jamaican cricketer. He made his List A debut on 9 November 2019, for Combined Campuses and Colleges in the 2019–20 Regional Super50 tournament.
