= Yannick Ottley =

West Indian cricketer (born 1991)

Personal information
- Full name: Khesan Yannick Gabriel Ottley
- Born: 7 September 1991 (age 35); Preysal, Trinidad
- Batting: Right-handed
- Bowling: Left-arm orthodox
- Relatives: Kjorn Ottley (brother)

Domestic team information
- Years: Team
- 2012: Combined Campuses
- 2012–present: Trinidad and Tobago

Career statistics
Competition	FC	LA	T20
Matches	37	40	15
Runs scored	1,307	469	141
Batting average	21.78	23.45	35.25
100s/50s	1/5	0/2	0/1
Top score	113	71	52*
Balls bowled	951	1,639	198
Wickets	13	59	12
Bowling average	37.46	16.74	17.41
5 wickets in innings	0	1	0
10 wickets in match	0	0	0
Best bowling	3/17	5/36	3/20
Catches/stumpings	30/0	17/0	2/0
- Source: CricketArchive, 10 October 2021

Khesan Yannick Gabriel Ottley (born 7 September 1991) is a Trinidadian cricketer who has played for both Trinidad and Tobago and the Combined Campuses and Colleges in West Indian domestic cricket.

The younger brother of Kjorn Ottley, Yannick Ottley played for the West Indies under-19s at the 2010 Under-19 World Cup in New Zealand. He was named vice-captain to Jamaica's Andre Creary, and captained the team in matches against Papua New Guinea and Bangladesh when Creary injured a groin. Those two matches were in fact Ottley's only games of the tournament, as he struggled with a thigh strain. The previous year, in October 2009, Ottley had also captained the West Indies under-19s at the 2009–10 WICB President's Cup, where matches held List A status.

Ottley made his first-class debut at the 2011–12 Regional Four Day Competition, playing for the Combined Campuses team. He switched to his home team, Trinidad and Tobago, for the 2012–13 season, and has since been a regular in the side. He made appearances for Trinidad and Tobago at the 2012 and 2013 Champions League Twenty20 tournaments, but has not yet been signed to a Caribbean Premier League franchise. During the 2015–16 Regional Four Day Competition, Ottley substituted for Rayad Emrit as captain during his time overseas. Later in the season, he came close to scoring a maiden first-class century, hitting 99 not out against the Windward Islands.

He was the joint-leading wicket-taker in the 2018–19 Regional Super50 tournament, with seventeen dismissals in nine matches. In August 2019, Cricket West Indies named him as the Super 50 Player of the Year. In November 2019, he was named as the vice-captain of Trinidad and Tobago for the 2019–20 Regional Super50 tournament. In February 2020, in the fourth round of the 2019–20 West Indies Championship, Ottley scored his maiden century in first-class cricket.
