= West Indian cricket team in Bangladesh in 2020–21 =

International cricket tour

	Bangladesh	West Indies
- Dates: 20 January – 15 February 2021
Captains	Mominul Haque (Tests); Tamim Iqbal (ODIs)	Kraigg Brathwaite (Tests); Jason Mohammed (ODIs)

Test series
- Result: West Indies won the 2-match series 2–0
Most runs	Litton Das (200)	Kyle Mayers (261)
Most wickets	Taijul Islam (12)	Rahkeem Cornwall (14)
- Player of the series: Nkrumah Bonner (WI)

One Day International series
- Results: Bangladesh won the 3-match series 3–0
Most runs	Tamim Iqbal (158)	Rovman Powell (116)
Most wickets	Mehidy Hasan (7)	Akeal Hosein (4)
- Player of the series: Shakib Al Hasan (Ban)

The West Indies cricket team toured Bangladesh in January and February 2021 to play two Tests and three One Day International (ODI) matches. The Test series formed part of the inaugural 2019–2021 ICC World Test Championship and the ODI series formed part of the inaugural 2020–2023 ICC Cricket World Cup Super League.

On 29 December 2020, Cricket West Indies announced their squads for the tour, with Kraigg Brathwaite and Jason Mohammed named as captains for the Test and ODI matches, respectively. Regular Test and ODI captains Jason Holder and Kieron Pollard were two of ten players who opted not to travel due to COVID-19 concerns or personal reasons. Shakib Al Hasan was named in Bangladesh's ODI squad, back for the first time after serving a year-long ban for failing to report a corrupt approach.

The first ODI saw seven cricketers make their debut in the format, six of them for the West Indies. Bangladesh won the opening match by six wickets, with more than 16 overs to spare. Bangladesh won the second ODI by seven wickets to take an unassailable lead in the series. Bangladesh won the third and final ODI by 120 runs, taking the series 3–0.

The West Indies won the first Test by three wickets, with Kyle Mayers scoring an unbeaten double century on debut. The West Indies also won the second Test, by 17 runs, to take the series 2–0.

== Background ==
Originally, the tour was scheduled to have three Tests, three ODIs and two Twenty20 International (T20I) matches. In October 2020, the Bangladesh Cricket Board (BCB) announced that the Bangabandhu T20 Cup would be used as the criteria to select players for the T20I matches. In November 2020, the BCB sent details of their bio-bubble plan to Cricket West Indies (CWI). Officials from CWI visited Bangladesh during November and December 2020, and reported that they were "very impressed" with the COVID-19 protocols in the country.

In November 2020, the two cricket boards also looked at the possibility of reducing the tour by one Test match, per a request that was made by the West Indies. In December 2020, both cricket boards agreed to play two Test matches instead of three, and dropped the T20I fixtures from the tour itinerary. On 10 January 2021, the BCB updated the tour itinerary, including changing the start times of the ODI matches and reducing the four-day tour match to a three-day fixture.

Bangladesh did not have any umpires on the Elite Panel of ICC Umpires. As a result, England's Richard Illingworth was named as one of the umpires for the Test matches, the first time since the start of the COVID-19 pandemic that a neutral umpire was named for a Test series.

== Squads ==
Tests		ODIs	
Bangladesh	West Indies	Bangladesh	West Indies
Mominul Haque (c); Taskin Ahmed; Shakib Al Hasan; Yasir Ali; Litton Das; Saif Hassan; Mehidy Hasan; Nayeem Hasan; Ebadot Hossain; Najmul Hossain Shanto; Tamim Iqbal; Shadman Islam; Taijul Islam; Abu Jayed; Hasan Mahmud; Mohammad Mithun; Mushfiqur Rahim; Mustafizur Rahman; Soumya Sarkar	Kraigg Brathwaite (c); Jermaine Blackwood (vc); Nkrumah Bonner; John Campbell; Rahkeem Cornwall; Joshua Da Silva; Shannon Gabriel; Kavem Hodge; Alzarri Joseph; Kyle Mayers; Shayne Moseley; Veerasammy Permaul; Kemar Roach; Raymon Reifer; Jomel Warrican	Tamim Iqbal (c); Taskin Ahmed; Shakib Al Hasan; Litton Das; Mahedi Hasan; Mehidy Hasan; Afif Hossain; Najmul Hossain Shanto; Rubel Hossain; Shoriful Islam; Taijul Islam; Mahmudullah; Mushfiqur Rahim; Hasan Mahmud; Mohammad Mithun; Mustafizur Rahman; Mohammad Saifuddin; Soumya Sarkar	Jason Mohammed (c); Sunil Ambris (vc); Nkrumah Bonner; Joshua Da Silva; Jahmar Hamilton; Keon Harding; Chemar Holder; Akeal Hosein; Alzarri Joseph; Kyle Mayers; Andre McCarthy; Kjorn Ottley; Rovman Powell; Raymon Reifer; ~~Romario Shepherd~~; ~~Hayden Walsh Jr.~~

Romario Shepherd was ruled out of the West Indies' squad due to a positive test for COVID-19, with Keon Harding named as his replacement. On 15 January 2021, Hayden Walsh Jr. was also ruled out of the West Indies' squad for testing positive for COVID-19. Shakib Al Hasan was ruled out of Bangladesh's squad for the second Test due to a thigh injury, with Soumya Sarkar named as his replacement. Shadman Islam was also ruled out of Bangladesh's squad for the second Test, due to a hip injury.

== Tour match ==
29–31 January 2021
Scorecard

West Indies	v	Bangladesh Cricket Board XI
257 (79.1 overs); Kraigg Brathwaite 85 (187); Rishad Hossain 5/75 (23.1 overs)		160 (47.4 overs); Mohammad Naim 45 (48); Rahkeem Cornwall 5/47 (16.4 overs)
291 (89.2 overs); Nkrumah Bonner 80 (138); Mukidul Islam 4/59 (17.2 overs)		63/2 (29 overs); Yasir Ali 33* (56); Raymon Reifer 2/7 (4 overs)

Match drawn
M. A. Aziz Stadium, Chittagong
Umpires: Mahfuzur Rahman (Ban) and Sharfuddoula (Ban)

- West Indies won the toss and elected to bat.

== ODI series ==
=== 1st ODI ===
20 January 2021
11:30
Scorecard

West Indies; 122 (32.2 overs)	v	Bangladesh; 125/4 (33.5 overs)
Kyle Mayers 40 (56); Shakib Al Hasan 4/8 (7.2 overs)		Tamim Iqbal 44 (69); Akeal Hosein 3/26 (10 overs)

Bangladesh won by 6 wickets
Sher-e-Bangla National Cricket Stadium, Dhaka
Umpires: Masudur Rahman (Ban) and Sharfuddoula (Ban)
Player of the match: Shakib Al Hasan (Ban)

- Bangladesh won the toss and elected to field.
- Hasan Mahmud (Ban), Nkrumah Bonner, Joshua Da Silva, Chemar Holder, Akeal Hosein, Kyle Mayers and Andre McCarthy (WI) all made their ODI debuts.
- World Cup Super League points: Bangladesh 10, West Indies 0.

=== 2nd ODI ===
22 January 2021
11:30
Scorecard

West Indies; 148 (43.4 overs)	v	Bangladesh; 149/3 (33.2 overs)
Rovman Powell 41 (66); Mehidy Hasan 4/25 (9.4 overs)		Tamim Iqbal 50 (76); Raymon Reifer 1/18 (5 overs)

Bangladesh won by 7 wickets
Sher-e-Bangla National Cricket Stadium, Dhaka
Umpires: Sharfuddoula (Ban) and Gazi Sohel (Ban)
Player of the match: Mehidy Hasan (Ban)

- West Indies won the toss and elected to bat.
- Kjorn Ottley (WI) made his ODI debut.
- World Cup Super League points: Bangladesh 10, West Indies 0.

=== 3rd ODI ===
25 January 2021
11:30
Scorecard

Bangladesh; 297/6 (50 overs)	v	West Indies; 177 (44.2 overs)
Mahmudullah 64* (43); Alzarri Joseph 2/48 (10 overs)		Rovman Powell 47 (49); Mohammad Saifuddin 3/51 (9 overs)

Bangladesh won by 120 runs
Zohur Ahmed Chowdhury Stadium, Chittagong
Umpires: Tanvir Ahmed (Ban) and Sharfuddoula (Ban)
Player of the match: Mushfiqur Rahim (Ban)

- West Indies won the toss and elected to field.
- Jahmar Hamilton and Keon Harding (WI) both made their ODI debuts.
- Keon Harding's 0 for 88 were the most expensive bowling figures by a West Indies bowler on their ODI debut.
- Mustafizur Rahman (Ban) took his 200th international wicket.
- World Cup Super League points: Bangladesh 10, West Indies 0.

== Test series ==
=== 1st Test ===
3–7 February 2021
Scorecard

Bangladesh	v	West Indies
430 (150.2 overs); Mehidy Hasan 103 (168); Jomel Warrican 4/133 (48 overs)		259 (96.1 overs); Kraigg Brathwaite 76 (111); Mehidy Hasan 4/58 (26 overs)
223/8d (67.5 overs); Mominul Haque 115 (182); Jomel Warrican 3/57 (17.5 overs)		395/7 (127.3 overs); Kyle Mayers 210* (310); Mehidy Hasan 4/113 (35 overs)

West Indies won by 3 wickets
Zohur Ahmed Chowdhury Stadium, Chittagong
Umpires: Richard Illingworth (Eng) and Sharfuddoula (Ban)
Player of the match: Kyle Mayers (WI)

- Bangladesh won the toss and elected to bat.
- Nkrumah Bonner, Kyle Mayers and Shayne Moseley (WI) all made their Test debuts.
- Mehidy Hasan (Ban) scored his first century in Tests.
- Mominul Haque became the first batsman for Bangladesh to score ten centuries in Tests, and scored his 3,000th run in Tests.
- Kyle Mayers became the 14th batsman for the West Indies to score a century on debut in Tests, and the 6th batsman to score a double century on Test debut.
- The West Indies made the fifth-highest successful run chase in the fourth innings of a Test, and the highest successful run chase in Asia.
- World Test Championship points: West Indies 60, Bangladesh 0.

=== 2nd Test ===
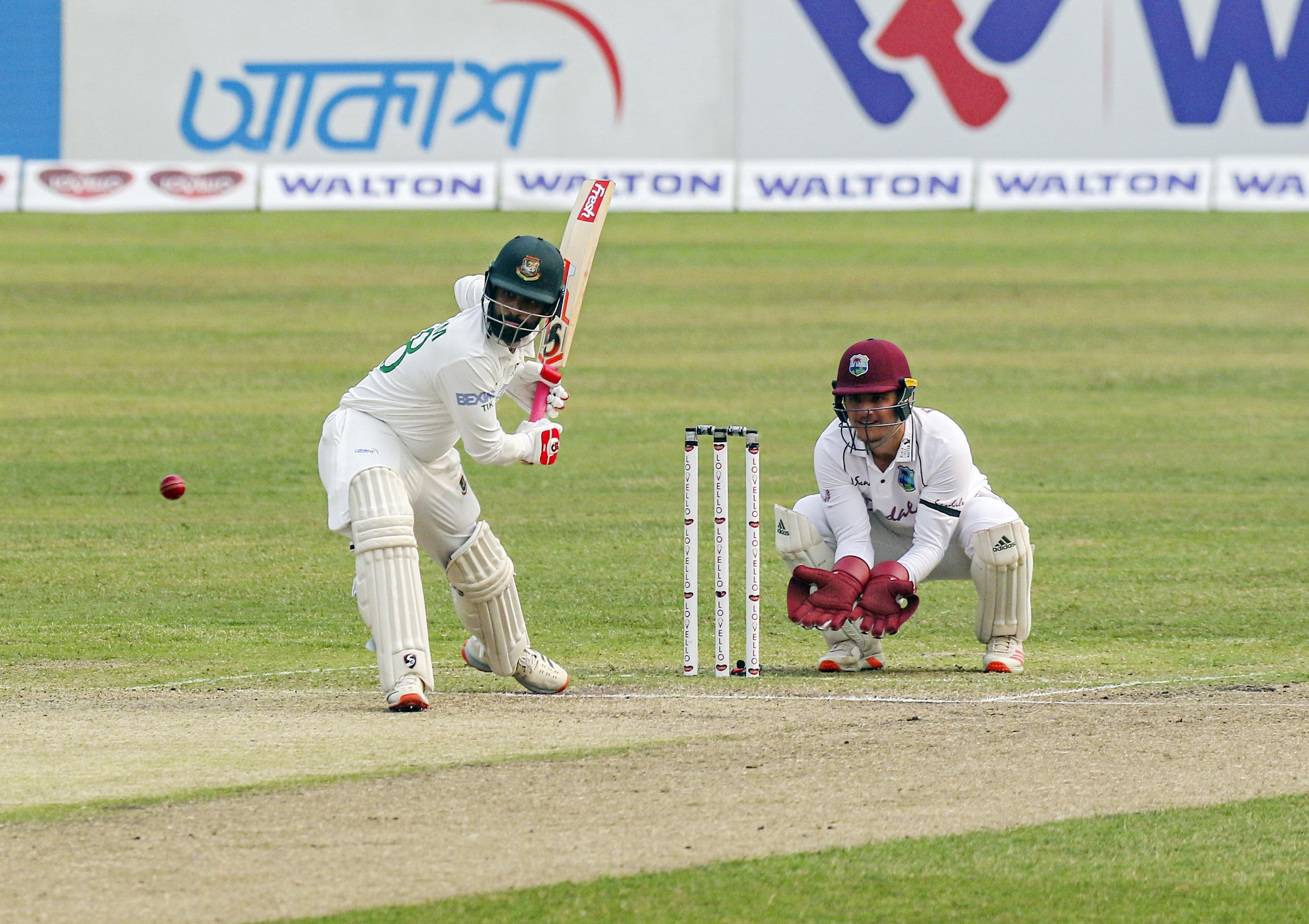
2nd Test Match at Dhaka

11–15 February 2021 (Note: While five days of play were scheduled for each Test, the second Test reached a result in four days.)
Scorecard

West Indies	v	Bangladesh
409 (142.2 overs); Joshua Da Silva 92 (187); Abu Jayed 4/98 (28 overs)		296 (96.5 overs); Litton Das 71 (133); Rahkeem Cornwall 5/74 (32 overs)
117 (52.5 overs); Nkrumah Bonner 38 (120); Taijul Islam 4/36 (21 overs)		213 (61.3 overs); Tamim Iqbal 50 (46); Rahkeem Cornwall 4/105 (30 overs)

West Indies won by 17 runs
Sher-e-Bangla National Cricket Stadium, Dhaka
Umpires: Richard Illingworth (Eng) and Sharfuddoula (Ban)
Player of the match: Rahkeem Cornwall (WI)

- West Indies won the toss and elected to bat.
- Mehidy Hasan became the fastest bowler for Bangladesh, in terms of matches, to take 100 wickets in Tests (24).
- World Test Championship points: West Indies 60, Bangladesh 0.
