= Shane Burton (cricketer) =

Antiguan cricketer (born 1992)

Personal information
- Full name: Shane Kelly Elliott Burton
- Born: 25 May 1992 (age 34); Antigua
- Batting: Left-handed
- Bowling: Right-arm medium
- Role: All-rounder

Domestic team information
- Years: Team
- 2011–2013: Leeward Islands
- Source: CricketArchive, 27 December 2015

Shane Kelly Elliott Burton (born 25 May 1992) is an Antiguan cricketer who has represented the Leeward Islands in West Indian domestic cricket. He is a left-handed batsman and right-arm medium-pace bowler.

Burton made his first-class debut for the Leewards during the 2010–11 Regional Four Day Competition, against the England Lions. He played two further matches in his debut season, against Combined Campuses and Colleges and Jamaica, but did not play at all at first-class level the following season. He did, however, represent the Leewards in the 2011–12 Caribbean Twenty20, playing a single match against the Windward Islands. Burton played for the Leewards in all three formats (first-class, List A, and Twenty20) during the 2012–13 season, but had little success, and has not played since.

In October 2019, he was named in the Leeward Islands' squad for the 2019–20 Regional Super50 tournament.
