= Ross Powell (cricketer) =

West Indian cricketer (born 1998)

Personal information
- Born: 5 February 1998 (age 28)
- Source: Cricinfo, 6 March 2020

Ross Powell (born 5 February 1998) is a West Indian cricketer. He made his first-class debut on 5 March 2020, for the Leeward Islands in the 2019–20 West Indies Championship. Prior to his first-class debut, Powell had also captained the Leeward Islands' under-17 team. He made his List A debut on 7 February 2021, for the Leeward Islands, in the 2020–21 Super50 Cup.
