= Jeet Mehta =

Canadian cricketer (born 1994)

Personal information
- Born: 6 December 1994 (age 31)

International information
- National side: Canada
- Source: Cricinfo, 9 November 2019

Jeet Mehta (born 6 December 1994) is an Indian cricketer. In October 2019, he was named in Canada's squad for the 2019–20 Regional Super50 tournament in the West Indies. He made his List A debut on 8 November 2019, for Canada against the Leeward Islands, in the Regional Super50 tournament.
