= Nauman Zafar =

Canadian cricketer (born 1995)

Personal information
- Born: 31 January 1995 (age 31)

International information
- National side: Canada
- Source: Cricinfo, 12 November 2019

Nauman Zafar (born 31 January 1995) is a Canadian cricketer. In October 2019, he was named in Canada's squad for the 2019–20 Regional Super50 tournament in the West Indies. He made his List A debut on 11 November 2019, for Canada against Barbados, in the Regional Super50 tournament.
