= Dennis Bulli =

Jamaican cricketer (born 1987)

Personal information
- Full name: Dennis Bulli
- Born: 26 March 1987 (age 39)

Domestic team information
- Years: Team
- 2015-present: Jamaica

Career statistics
| Competition | FC | List A |
|---|---|---|
| Matches | 13 | 8 |
| Runs scored | 245 | 37 |
| Batting average | 11.13 | 12.33 |
| 100s/50s | 0/0 | 0/0 |
| Top score | 33 | 18 |
| Balls bowled | 1767 | 450 |
| Wickets | 33 | 15 |
| Bowling average | 36.12 | 29.26 |
| 5 wickets in innings | 3 | 0 |
| 10 wickets in match | 1 | 0 |
| Best bowling | 5/54 | 4/40 |
| Catches/stumpings | 5/0 | 3/0 |
- Source: Cricinfo, 9 October 2021

Dennis Bulli (born 26 March 1987) is a Jamaican cricketer. He made his first-class debut for Jamaica in the 2015–16 Regional Four Day Competition on 18 March 2016. In October 2017, he took his maiden five-wicket haul in first-class cricket, bowling for Jamaica against Guyana in the 2017–18 Regional Four Day Competition. In January 2019 he took ten wickets in a match for the Windward Islands in the 2018–19 Regional Four Day Competition Round 5. In October 2019, he was named in Jamaica's squad for the 2019–20 Regional Super50 tournament. He made his List A debut on 12 November 2019, for Jamaica in the 2019–20 Regional Super50 tournament.

In July 2020, he was named in the St Kitts & Nevis Patriots squad for the 2020 Caribbean Premier League.
