= Kaske =

Kaske or Kaské is a surname. Notable people with the surname include:

- Charlot Kaské (fl. 1763–1765), Shawnee war chief
- Karlheinz Kaske (1928–1998), German manager
- Robert Kaske (1921–1989), American professor

== See also ==
- Kask (surname)
