= Odain McCatty =

West Indian cricketer (born 1996)

Personal information
- Full name: Odain McCatty
- Born: 10 May 1996 (age 30); Jamaica
- Source: Cricinfo, 7 November 2019

Odain McCatty (born 10 May 1996) is a Jamaican cricketer. He made his List A debut on 6 November 2019, for Combined Campuses and Colleges in the 2019–20 Regional Super50 tournament.
