= Nino Henry =

Antiguan cricketer (born 1992)

Personal information
- Born: 6 October 1992 (age 34); Antigua
- Batting: Right-handed
- Bowling: Right-arm medium

Domestic team information
- Years: Team
- 2016: Combined Campuses
- Source: ESPNcricinfo, 2 January 2016

Nino Henry (born 6 October 1992) is an Antiguan cricketer who has played for the Combined Campuses and Colleges in West Indian domestic cricket. A right-arm pace bowler, he made his List A debut for the team in January 2016, against the Windward Islands in the 2015–16 Regional Super50. He neither batted nor bowled on debut, as the match was interrupted by rain, but did both in the following fixture against Guyana, scoring 12 not out and taking 0/18 from three overs.

In October 2019, he was named in the Leeward Islands' squad for the 2019–20 Regional Super50 tournament. He made his first-class debut on 13 February 2020, for the Leeward Islands in the 2019–20 West Indies Championship.
