= Akshaya Persaud =

Guyanese cricketer (born 1997)

Personal information
- Born: 1 July 1997 (age 29); Guyana
- Batting: Left-handed
- Bowling: Right-arm fast-medium

Domestic team information
- Years: Team
- 2017–: Guyana
- Source: Cricinfo, 22 January 2021

Akshaya Persaud (born 1 July 1997) is a Guyanese cricketer. He made his first-class debut for Guyana in the 2017–18 Regional Four Day Competition on 4 January 2018. In October 2019, he was named in the Combined Campuses and Colleges squad for the 2019–20 Regional Super50 tournament and made his List A debut on 6 November 2019.

Persaud represented Guyana at the first-class level after progressing through the under-15, under-17 and under-19 levels, and was a standby player on the West Indies under-19 team for the International Cricket Council's (ICC) 2016 Youth World Cup.

Persaud is one of four siblings, and his younger brother Ajita Persaud plays as well in the regional West Demerara Cricket Association. He is captain of the Cornelia Ida Cricket Club as well as a certified level two coach. When not playing, he is working on obtaining his degree in business management.
