= Kjorn Ottley =

West Indian cricketer (born 1989)

Personal information
- Full name: Kjorn Yohance Ottley
- Born: 9 December 1989 (age 36); Preysal, Trinidad
- Batting: Left-handed
- Bowling: Right arm off-spin
- Role: Opening batter
- Relatives: Yannick Ottley (brother)

International information
- National side: West Indies
- ODI debut (cap 203): 22 January 2021 v Bangladesh
- Last ODI: 6 February 2024 v Australia

Domestic team information
- Years: Team
- 2010–2011: Combined Campuses
- 2011–present: Trinidad and Tobago

Career statistics
Competition	ODI	FC	LA	T20
Matches	4	21	63	3
Runs scored	25	938	1,701	40
Batting average	10.25	23.45	31.50	20.0
100s/50s	0/0	0/4	2/9	0/0
Top score	24	99	134*	25
Catches/stumpings	1/0	10/0	20/0	3/0
- Source: ESPNcricinfo, 16 January 2024

Kjorn Yohance Ottley (born 9 December 1989) is a Trinidadian cricketer who has played for both Trinidad and Tobago and the Combined Campuses and Colleges in West Indian domestic cricket. He made his international debut for the West Indies cricket team in January 2021.

== Career ==
The older brother of Yannick Ottley, Kjorn Ottley made his debut in West Indian domestic competition for the Combined Campuses team, playing in the 2009–10 Regional Four Day Competition and WICB President's Cup. For the 2012–13 season, he switched to representing his home country, Trinidad and Tobago. Ottley came close to a maiden first-class century during the 2014–15 Regional Four Day Competition, making 99 from 173 balls in his team's second innings against Jamaica.

He was the leading run-scorer for Combined Campuses and Colleges in the 2018–19 Regional Super50 tournament, with 306 runs in nine matches.

He made his Twenty20 debut on 5 September 2019, for the St Kitts & Nevis Patriots, in the 2019 Caribbean Premier League. The following month, he was selected to play for Barbados in the 2019–20 Regional Super50 tournament. On 17 November 2019, during the Super50 tournament, Ottley scored his first century in List A cricket. He was the leading run-scorer for Barbados in the tournament, with 325 runs in nine matches.

In December 2020, Ottley was named in the West Indies' One Day International (ODI) squad for their series against Bangladesh. He made his ODI debut for the West Indies, against Bangladesh, on 22 January 2021.
