= Paul Palmer (cricketer) =

West Indian cricketer (born 1992)

Personal information
- Born: 5 January 1992 (age 34); Jamaica
- Batting: Left-handed

Domestic team information
- Years: Team
- 2013/14–2019/20: Combined Campuses
- 2015/16–2022/23: Jamaica

Career statistics
Competition	First-class	List A
Matches	49	16
Runs scored	2,099	426
Batting average	24.69	26.62
100s/50s	4/9	1/2
Top score	144*	105
Catches/stumpings	3/–	31/–
- Source: ESPNcricinfo, 15 August 2024

Paul Palmer (born 5 January 1992) is a Jamaican cricketer who has played for both Jamaica and the Combined Campuses and Colleges in West Indian domestic cricket. He is a left-handed batsman.

A graduate of St. Elizabeth Technical High School, Palmer made his first-class debut for the Combined Campuses during the 2013–14 Regional Four Day Competition, having earlier represented the Jamaica under-19s. His List A debut came the following season, in the 2014–15 Regional Super50. Palmer switched to Jamaica for the 2015–16 season, and in October 2015 it was announced that he would captain the team in the 2015–16 Regional Four Day Competition, despite having only played two previous first-class games. Although he made a golden duck on his captaincy debut against Barbados, he went on to score his maiden first-class half-century three matches later, against the Leeward Islands.

In October 2019, he was named in the Combined Campuses' squad for the 2019–20 Regional Super50 tournament. On 25 November 2019, on the final day of group stage matches in the Super50, Palmer scored his first century in List A cricket, with 105 runs against Canada. He was the leading run-scorer for Combined Campuses and Colleges in the tournament, with 267 runs in eight matches.
