= Emmanuel Stewart =

West Indian cricketer

Personal information
- Full name: Emmanuel Winston Junior Augustine Stewart
- Born: 23 August 1999 (age 27); Meldrum Village, Carriacou, Grenada
- Batting: Right-handed
- Role: Wicket-keeper/Batsman

Domestic team information
- Years: Team
- 2017: West Indies U19
- 2019-: Windward Islands
- First-class debut: 7 March 2019 Windward Islands v Leeward Islands
- Last First-class: 12 March 2020 Windward Islands v Trinidad and Tobago
- List A debut: 25 January 2017 West Indies U19 v Windward Islands
- Last List A: 23 November 2019 Windward Islands v United States

Career statistics
Competition	FC	List A
Matches	9	24
Runs scored	276	423
Batting average	18.40	19.22
100s/50s	0/3	0/2
Top score	56	56
Catches/stumpings	24/1	26/3
- Source: ESPNcricinfo, 10 October 2021

Emmanuel Stewart (born 23 August 1999) is a Grenadian cricketer. He made his List A debut for the West Indies Under-19s in the 2016–17 Regional Super50 on 25 January 2017. Prior to his List A debut, he was named in the West Indies squad for the 2016 Under-19 Cricket World Cup. In November 2017, he was named as the captain of the West Indies squad for the 2018 Under-19 Cricket World Cup.

He made his first-class debut for the Windward Islands in the 2018–19 Regional Four Day Competition on 7 March 2019. In October 2019, he was named in the Windward Islands' squad for the 2019–20 Regional Super50 tournament.
