= Kanwar Mann =

Canadian cricketer (born 1996)

Personal information
- Born: 27 June 1996 (age 30)

International information
- National side: Canada
- Source: Cricinfo, 9 November 2019

Kanwar Mann (born 27 June 1996) is a Canadian cricketer. In October 2019, he was named in Canada's squad for the 2019–20 Regional Super50 tournament in the West Indies. He made his List A debut on 8 November 2019, for Canada against the Leeward Islands, in the Regional Super50 tournament.
