= Harmandeep Singh (cricketer) =

Canadian cricketer (born 1990)

Personal information
- Born: 28 November 1990 (age 35)

International information
- National side: Canada
- Source: Cricinfo, 12 November 2019

Harmandeep Singh (born 28 November 1990) is a Canadian cricketer. In October 2019, he was named in Canada's squad for the 2019–20 Regional Super50 tournament in the West Indies. He made his List A debut on 11 November 2019, for Canada against Barbados, in the Regional Super50 tournament.
