= Kemol Savory =

West Indian cricketer (born 1996)

Personal information
- Full name: Kemol Savory
- Born: 27 September 1996 (age 30)

Career statistics
| Competition | LA |
|---|---|
| Matches | 6 |
| Runs scored | 85 |
| Batting average | 21.25 |
| 100s/50s | 0/1 |
| Top score | 71* |
| Balls bowled | - |
| Wickets | - |
| Bowling average | - |
| 5 wickets in innings | - |
| 10 wickets in match | - |
| Best bowling | -/- |
| Catches/stumpings | 3/2 |
- Source: Cricinfo, 9 October 2021

Kemol Savory (born 27 September 1996) is a Guyanese cricketer. He made his List A debut on 7 November 2019, for Guyana in the 2019–20 Regional Super50 tournament.
