= Akeal Hosein =

West Indian cricketer (born 1993)

Personal information
- Full name: Akeal Jerome Hosein
- Born: 25 April 1993 (age 33); Port of Spain, Trinidad and Tobago
- Batting: Left-handed
- Bowling: Slow left-arm orthodox
- Role: Bowler

International information
- National side: West Indies (2021–present)
- ODI debut (cap 200): 20 January 2021 v Bangladesh
- Last ODI: 23 October 2025 v Bangladesh
- T20I debut (cap 86): 6 July 2021 v South Africa
- Last T20I: 9 October 2026 v India
- T20I shirt no.: 7

Domestic team information
- Years: Team
- 2013–2023: Trinidad & Tobago
- 2014–2018: Barbados Tridents
- 2019–present: Trinbago Knight Riders
- 2022/23–2023/24: Melbourne Renegades
- 2023: Sunrisers Hyderabad
- 2024: Southern Brave
- 2024/25: Sydney Sixers
- 2025: Trent Rockets
- 2026: Joburg Super Kings
- 2026–present: Chennai Super Kings

Career statistics
Competition	ODI	T20I	FC	LA
Matches	40	101	24	91
Runs scored	309	322	644	645
Batting average	14.71	14.63	17.88	15.35
100s/50s	0/1	0/0	1/2	0/1
Top score	60	44*	102*	60
Balls bowled	2,210	2,060	4,193	4,757
Wickets	63	95	66	128
Bowling average	28.07	27.18	27.84	27.08
5 wickets in innings	0	1	3	1
10 wickets in match	0	0	1	0
Best bowling	4/39	5/11	6/33	5/26
Catches/stumpings	17/–	24/–	23/–	35/–
- Source: Cricinfo, 14 October 2026

Akeal Jerome Hosein (born 25 April 1993) is a Trinidadian cricketer who represents the West Indies cricket team. He plays for Chennai Super Kings in the Indian Premier League and Trinbago Knight Riders in the Caribbean Premier League.

== Domestic and T20 career ==
Born in Port of Spain, Hosein represented the West Indies under-19s at the 2012 Under-19 World Cup in Australia. His first-class debut for Trinidad and Tobago came during the 2012–13 Regional Four Day Competition, against Jamaica. The following season, Hosein was man of the match in consecutive games, taking 6/33 and 5/34 against the Windward Islands and then scoring a maiden first-class century, 102 not out, against the Leewards. He subsequently signed with the Barbados Tridents for the 2014 Caribbean Premier League, and has since made appearances for the team at the 2014 Champions League Twenty20 and the 2015 CPL tournaments.

In November 2019, he was named in Trinidad and Tobago's squad for the 2019–20 Regional Super50 tournament. In July 2020, he was named in the Trinbago Knight Riders squad for the 2020 Caribbean Premier League. On 23 December 2022, he was bought by Sunrisers Hyderabad for IPL 2023. He was released by them in November 2023 after just one season.

In 2023, Hosein was signed to play for the Quetta Gladiators in the 9th edition of the Pakistani Super League.

On 8 March 2024, during a game against Peshawar Zalmi, Hosein took a hat-trick, dismissing Aamer Jamal, Mehran Mumtaz and Luke Wood in three consecutive deliveries, becoming only the sixth bowler to take a hat-trick in the PSL.

== International career ==
In December 2020, Hosein was named in the West Indies' One Day International (ODI) squad for their series against Bangladesh. He made his ODI debut for the West Indies, against Bangladesh, on 20 January 2021. In February 2021, he was named in the West Indies' Twenty20 International (T20I) squad for their series against Sri Lanka.

In May 2021, Akeal was given a white-ball central contract by the Cricket West Indies for the 2020–21 season. He was one of the 10 players to be given a white-ball central contract for the 2020–21 season. In June 2021, he was added to the West Indies' Twenty20 International (T20I) squad for their series against South Africa. He made his T20I debut on 3 July 2021, for the West Indies against South Africa. In July 2021, he was included in the West Indies squad to play the last two T20Is against Australia.

In September 2021, Hosein was named as one of four reserve players in the West Indies' squad for the 2021 ICC Men's T20 World Cup. In October 2021, Hosein was added to the West Indies' 2021 ICC Men's T20 World Cup squad replacing Fabian Allen who was ruled out with an ankle injury.

In May 2024, he was named in the West Indies squad for the 2024 ICC Men's T20 World Cup tournament.
