= Desron Maloney =

West Indian cricketer (born 1991)

Personal information
- Full name: Desron Maloney
- Born: 5 May 1991 (age 35); Saint Vincent

Career statistics
Competition	FC	LA
Matches	5	9
Runs scored	178	207
Batting average	25.42	23.00
100s/50s	0/1	0/1
Top score	83	56
Balls bowled	-	-
Wickets	-	-
Bowling average	-	-
5 wickets in innings	-	-
10 wickets in match	-	-
Best bowling	-/-	-/-
Catches/stumpings	4/–	2/–
- Source: Cricinfo, 10 October 2021

Desron Maloney (born 5 May 1991) is a West Indian cricketer. He made his List A debut on 7 November 2019, for the Windward Islands in the 2019–20 Regional Super50 tournament. He made his first-class debut on 9 January 2020, for the Windward Islands in the 2019–20 West Indies Championship.
