= Quinton Boatswain =

Montserratian cricketer

Personal information
- Full name: Quinton Hubert Boatswain
- Born: 16 October 1990 (age 36); Montserrat
- Batting: Right-handed
- Bowling: Right-arm fast-medium
- Role: Bowler

Domestic team information
- Years: Team
- 2007/08: Montserrat
- 2012/13–2020/21: Leeward Islands

Career statistics
Competition	FC	LA	T20
Matches	24	19	1
Runs scored	168	33	–
Batting average	8.00	8.25	–
100s/50s	0/0	0/0	–
Top score	30*	12*	–
Balls bowled	2,642	900	12
Wickets	37	34	0
Bowling average	41.70	25.61	–
5 wickets in innings	0	0	–
10 wickets in match	0	0	–
Best bowling	4/82	4/45	–
Catches/stumpings	7/0	3/0	0/–
- Source: Cricinfo, 8 February 2021

Quinton Hubert Boatswain (born 16 October 1990) is a West Indian cricketer from Montserrat. Boatswain is a right-handed batsman who bowls right-arm fast-medium. He is a member of the Leeward Islands cricket team.

== Career ==
In January 2008, Montserrat were invited to take part in the 2008 Stanford 20/20, whose matches held official Twenty20 status. Boatswain made a single appearance for Montserrat in their preliminary round match against the Turks and Caicos Islands, with Montserrat winning by 9 wickets. He bowled two wicketless overs which conceded 8 runs in the Turks and Caicos Islands innings, while in Montserrat's innings he wasn't required to bat. In 2008 and 2009, he played at Under-19 level for the Leeward Islands, making a total of eight appearances. As of 2012, he was playing minor matches for Montserrat.
