= Zachary McCaskie =

West Indian cricketer (born 1996)

Personal information
- Born: 18 November 1996 (age 29)
- Batting: Right-handed
- Bowling: Right-arm off-break
- Role: Top order batsman

Domestic team information
- Years: Team
- 2019–present: Barbados

Career statistics
Competition	FC	LA
Matches	18	16
Runs scored	994	518
Batting average	30.12	37.00
100s/50s	1/6	1/2
Top score	101	131
Catches/stumpings	19/–	8/–
- Source: ESPNcricinfo, 8 June 2024

Zachary McCaskie (born 18 November 1996) is a Barbadian cricketer. He made his List A debut on 23 November 2019, for Barbados in the 2019–20 Regional Super50 tournament.
