= McCaskey =

McCaskey is a surname. Notable people with the surname include:

- Evan McCaskey (1965–1989), American guitarist that played for the bands Exodus and Blind Illusion
- John G. McCaskey (1874–1924), American oil businessman
- John Piersol McCaskey (1873–1934), American politician and educator
- Michael McCaskey (1943–2020), chairman of the Chicago Bears in the National Football League.
- Virginia Halas McCaskey (1923–2025), principal owner of the Chicago Bears of the National Football League

== See also ==
- J. P. McCaskey High School, public high school located in Lancaster, Pennsylvania, United States
