= Andre McCarthy =

Jamaican cricketer (born 1987)

Personal information
- Full name: Andre McIntosh McCarthy
- Born: 8 June 1987 (age 39); Kingston, Jamaica
- Batting: Right-handed
- Bowling: Right-arm offspin
- Role: Batsman

International information
- National side: West Indies (2018–2021)
- ODI debut (cap 201): 20 January 2021 v Bangladesh
- Last ODI: 22 January 2021 v Bangladesh
- Only T20I (cap 74): 3 April 2018 v Pakistan

Domestic team information
- Years: Team
- 2013–present: Jamaica
- 2016–present: Jamaica Tallawahs
- 2024: Durdanto Dhaka

Career statistics
Competition	ODI	T20I	FC	LA
Matches	2	1	30	80
Runs scored	15	5	1,068	2,533
Batting average	7.50	5.00	19.07	34.22
100s/50s	0/0	0/0	1/4	3/13
Top score	12	5	121	118
Balls bowled	12	12	543	1,292
Wickets	0	0	9	36
Bowling average	–	–	30.00	25.91
5 wickets in innings	–	–	0	2
10 wickets in match	–	–	0	0
Best bowling	–	–	3/18	6/16
Catches/stumpings	0/–	0/–	22/–	23/–
- Source: CricInfo, 17 April 2023

Andre McIntosh McCarthy (born 8 June 1987) is a Jamaican cricketer. He played for the West Indies in the 2006 Under-19 Cricket World Cup in Sri Lanka. He plays domestically for Jamaica and the Jamaica Tallawahs.

In March 2018, he was named in the West Indies squad for their Twenty20 International (T20I) series against Pakistan. He made his T20I debut for the West Indies against Pakistan on 3 April 2018.

He was the leading run-scorer for Jamaica in the 2018–19 Regional Super50 tournament, with 334 runs in nine matches. In October 2019, he was named in Jamaica's squad for the 2019–20 Regional Super50 tournament. In July 2020, he was named in the Jamaica Tallawahs squad for the 2020 Caribbean Premier League.

In December 2020, McCarthy was named in the West Indies' One Day International (ODI) squad for their series against Bangladesh. He made his ODI debut for the West Indies, against Bangladesh, on 20 January 2021.

In June 2021, he was selected to take part in the Minor League Cricket tournament in the United States following the players' draft.
