= Jason Mohammed =

West Indian cricketer

Personal information
- Full name: Jason Nazimuddin Mohammed
- Born: 23 September 1986 (age 40); Barrackpore, Trinidad and Tobago
- Batting: Right-handed
- Bowling: Right-arm medium fast Right-arm off-break
- Role: Batsman

International information
- National side: West Indies (2011–2021)
- ODI debut (cap 163): 11 December 2011 v India
- Last ODI: 22 July 2021 v Australia
- ODI shirt no.: 3
- T20I debut (cap 67): 1 April 2017 v Pakistan
- Last T20I: 3 April 2018 v Pakistan
- T20I shirt no.: 3

Domestic team information
- Years: Team
- 2006–present: Trinidad and Tobago
- 2014-2015: Trinbago Knight Riders
- 2016–2018: Guyana Amazon Warriors (squad no. 3)
- 2019: St. Kitts and Nevis Patriots

Career statistics
Competition	ODI	T20I	FC	LA
Matches	36	9	107	135
Runs scored	630	90	5555	3713
Batting average	21.72	18.00	32.86	39.50
100s/50s	0/4	0/0	17/20	6/23
Top score	91*	23*	220	142
Balls bowled	440	12	2459	1745
Wickets	8	0	27	37
Bowling average	42.50	–	33.70	35.21
5 wickets in innings	0	0	0	0
10 wickets in match	0	0	0	0
Best bowling	3/47	–	3/41	3/19
Catches/stumpings	4/–	1/–	89/–	34/–
- Source: ESPNcricinfo, 20 April 2025

Jason Nazimuddin Mohammed (born 23 September 1986) is a Trinidadian cricketer. He plays first-class and List A cricket for Trinidad and Tobago. and internationally played for West Indies cricket team in limited overs cricket.

== Cricketing career ==
Mohammed is an aggressive right-handed middle-order batsman and a part-time off spinner. In 2006, he made his debut in first class and represented West Indies in the Under-19 World Cup. Since then, he has been in the squad for most of T&T's first-class matches. He made his ODI debut in 2011 against India at Chennai before playing his next ODI almost 4 years later in 2015.

In November 2016, Mohammed was added to the West Indies' ODI squad for the 2016–17 Zimbabwe Tri-Series. In March 2017, he was named in the West Indies squad for the Twenty20 International (T20I) series against Pakistan. He made his T20I debut for the West Indies against Pakistan on 1 April 2017. On 6 April 2017, West Indies chased the highest total in their cricket history, Jason had a major role in that chase by playing an innings of 91 not out. Needing 128 off 13 overs, Mohammed supported by Ashley Nurse sailed West Indies to a historic victory. He was declared Man of the Match. On 29 September 2017, against England he captained the West Indies for the first time in ODIs.

In March 2018, Mohammed was named as the captain of the West Indies squad for their Twenty20 International (T20I) series against Pakistan.

In August 2019, Mohammed joined the St. Kitts and Nevis Patriots as a replacement for Isuru Udana. In November 2019, he was named in Trinidad and Tobago's squad for the 2019–20 Regional Super50 tournament. In February 2020, in the fourth round of the 2019–20 West Indies Championship, Mohammed scored his tenth century in first-class cricket.

In December 2020, Mohammed was named as the captain of the West Indies' ODI squad for their series against Bangladesh.
