= Fabian Allen =

West Indian cricketer

Personal information
- Full name: Fabian Anthony Allen
- Born: 7 May 1995 (age 31); Kingston, Jamaica
- Batting: Right-handed
- Bowling: Slow left-arm orthodox
- Role: Bowling all-rounder

International information
- National side: West Indies (2018–present)
- ODI debut (cap 188): 27 October 2018 v India
- Last ODI: 11 February 2022 v India
- ODI shirt no.: 97
- T20I debut (cap 75): 4 November 2018 v India
- Last T20I: 17 October 2024 v Sri Lanka
- T20I shirt no.: 97

Domestic team information
- Years: Team
- 2016–present: Jamaica
- 2017–2021: St Kitts and Nevis Patriots
- 2019: Sylhet Sixers
- 2021: Punjab Kings
- 2021: Peshawar Zalmi
- 2022: Mumbai Indians
- 2022–2023: Jamaica Tallawahs
- 2023: Dubai Capitals
- 2023: Kandy Falcons
- 2024: Jaffna Kings
- 2024: Abu Dhabi Knight Riders
- 2024: Paarl Royals
- 2024–present: Antigua and Barbuda Falcons
- 2024/25: Adelaide Strikers
- 2025: Hobart Hurricanes

Career statistics
Competition	ODI	T20I	FC	LA
Matches	20	39	15	41
Runs scored	200	272	776	512
Batting average	15.38	15.11	31.04	18.28
100s/50s	0/1	0/0	2/4	0/2
Top score	51	34	169*	62*
Balls bowled	666	581	1,067	1,447
Wickets	7	24	15	22
Bowling average	89.57	30.45	38.33	57.77
5 wickets in innings	0	0	0	0
10 wickets in match	0	0	0	0
Best bowling	2/40	2/18	4/47	2/18
Catches/stumpings	10/0	22/0	10/0	21/0
- Source: ESPNcricinfo, 7 January 2024

Fabian Allen (born 7 May 1995) is a Jamaican cricketer. He made his first-class debut for Jamaica in the 2016–17 Regional Four Day Competition on 25 November 2016. Prior to his first-class debut, he was part of the West Indies squad for the 2014 Under-19 Cricket World Cup. He made his international debut for the West Indies in October 2018.

== Domestic and T20 franchise career ==
In the last few games of the 2016-17 Regional Four Day Competition, he scored 50s in three consecutive matches. He was picked up in the 13th round of the 2017 CPL Draft by the St Kitts and Nevis Patriots. He made his Twenty20 debut for St Kitts and Nevis Patriots in the 2017 Caribbean Premier League on 19 August 2017.

In November 2017, he scored his maiden century in first-class cricket, making 169 not out for Jamaica against Trinidad and Tobago in the 2017–18 Regional Four Day Competition. He made his List A debut for Jamaica in the 2017–18 Regional Super50 on 6 February 2018.

In June 2018, he was named in the Cricket West Indies B Team squad for the inaugural edition of the Global T20 Canada tournament. In October 2018, he was named in the squad for the Sylhet Sixers team, following the draft for the 2018–19 Bangladesh Premier League. In July 2020, he was named in the St Kitts & Nevis Patriots squad for the 2020 Caribbean Premier League. However, on 6 August 2020, Allen was ruled out of the tournament after missing his flight.

In February 2021, Allen was bought by the Punjab Kings in the IPL auction ahead of the 2021 Indian Premier League. He made his IPL debut on 21 April 2021 against the Sunrisers Hyderabad, taking the only wicket of the Sunrisers' innings (David Warner), ending the match with the figures of 1-22 from his four overs.

In April 2021, he was signed by Peshawar Zalmi to play in the rescheduled matches in the 2021 Pakistan Super League. In February 2022, he was bought by the Mumbai Indians in the auction for the 2022 Indian Premier League tournament. In July 2022, he was signed by the Kandy Falcons for the third edition of the Lanka Premier League.

== International career ==
In October 2018, he was named in the West Indies' One Day International (ODI) and Twenty20 International (T20I) squads for series against India. He made his ODI debut for the West Indies against India on 27 October 2018. He made his T20I debut for the West Indies against India on 4 November 2018.

In April 2019, he was named in the West Indies' squad for the 2019 Cricket World Cup. In July 2019, Cricket West Indies awarded him with a central contract for the first time, ahead of the 2019–20 season. In September 2021, Allen was named in the West Indies' squad for the 2021 ICC Men's T20 World Cup.
