= List of United States Virgin Islands Twenty20 players =

From their first match in 2006 to their final match in 2008, fifteen players represented the United States Virgin Islands cricket team in Twenty20 (T20) matches in the Stanford 20/20. A Twenty20 match is a cricket match between two representative teams of one twenty over innings per side.

The United States Virgin Islands has fielded a representative team since at least 1991. In regional domestic cricket, the United States Virgin Islands plays as part of the Leeward Islands cricket team, which holds first-class, List A (neither of which the United States Virgin Islands has ever held) and Twenty20 status. However, for the Stanford 20/20, islands in the Caribbean were allowed to play as separate teams, allowing the United States Virgin Islands the chance to compete with its own team in the 2006 tournament. The United States Virgin Islands played two matches in the tournament, defeating Sint Maarten by 47 runs in their preliminary round match, before losing in the first round to St Vincent and the Grenadines by 5 wickets. Two years later, the United States Virgin Islands took part in the 2008 tournament. They played two matches in the tournament, one a preliminary round victory against St Kitts by 4 wickets, before losing in the first round to Antigua and Barbuda by 24 runs. The United States Virgin Islands would have taken part in a further tournament to be played in 2009, however its creator Allen Stanford was charged with fraud and arrested in June 2009, bringing an end to the competition. The tournament was then replaced by the Caribbean Twenty20, with only first-class teams allowed to take part. (Note: The first-class domestic teams in the West Indies are: Barbados, Combined Campuses and Colleges, Guyana, Jamaica, Leeward Islands, Trinidad and Tobago and Windward Islands.)

In total, the United States Virgin Islands played four Twenty20 matches, all at the Stanford Cricket Ground, with ten players playing in all four matches. Sherville Huggins scored more runs than any other Virgin Islander with 126, with him also making the highest individual score of 51 against Saint Maarten, also making him the only Virgin Islander to pass fifty runs in an innings. Calvin Lewis and Dane Weston have both claimed 6 wickets in Twenty20 matches, more than any other Virgin Islander, however of the two, Lewis has the better bowling average of 8.66. Lewis' figures of 3/16 against Antigua and Barbuda are the best bowling figures by a Virgin Islander. Huggins captained the team in all four matches, while Alderman Lesmond was the team's wicket-keeper in all four matches it played.

This list includes all players who have played at least one Twenty20 match and is initially arranged in the order of debut appearance. Where more than one player won their first cap in the same match, those players are initially listed alphabetically at the time of debut.

== Key ==
General

- ‡ – Captain
- † – Wicket-keeper
- First – Year of debut
- Last – Year of latest game
- Mat – Number of matches played

Batting

- Inn – Number of innings batted
- NO – Number of innings not out
- Runs – Runs scored in career
- HS – Highest score
- Avg – Runs scored per dismissal
- * – Batsman remained not out

Bowling

- Balls – Balls bowled in career
- Wkt – Wickets taken in career
- BBI – Best bowling in an innings
- Ave – Average runs per wicket
- Eco - Average runs conceded per over

Fielding

- Ca – Catches taken
- St – Stumpings taken

== Twenty20 cricketers ==
United States Virgin Islands Twenty20 cricketers
| No. | Name | First | Last | Mat | Inn | NO | Runs | HS | Avg | Balls | Wkt | BBI | Ave | Eco | Ca | St | Ref |
| No. | Name | First | Last | Mat | Batting | | | | | Bowling | | | | | Fielding | | Ref |
|---|---|---|---|---|---|---|---|---|---|---|---|---|---|---|---|---|---|
| 1 | Terrance Webbe | 2006 | 2007/08 | 4 | 4 | 2 | 12 | 7* | 6.00 | 60 | 2 | 1/20 | 36.00 | 7.20 | 1 | 0 | |
| 2 | Alderman Lesmond † | 2006 | 2007/08 | 4 | 4 | 0 | 26 | 14 | 6.50 | — | — | — | — | — | 3 | 2 | |
| 3 | Sherville Huggins ‡ | 2006 | 2007/08 | 4 | 4 | 1 | 146 | 51 | 48.66 | 48 | 3 | 2/17 | 20.33 | 7.62 | 0 | 0 | |
| 4 | Clifford Walwyn | 2006 | 2007/08 | 4 | 4 | 0 | 68 | 40 | 17.00 | — | — | — | — | — | 0 | 0 | |
| 5 | Mark Vitalis | 2006 | 2007/08 | 3 | 3 | 0 | 24 | 13 | 8.00 | — | — | — | — | — | 1 | 0 | |
| 6 | Dale Africa | 2006 | 2006 | 2 | 2 | 0 | 17 | 15 | 8.50 | — | — | — | — | — | 0 | 0 | |
| 7 | Hamish Anthony | 2006 | 2007/08 | 4 | 4 | 0 | 49 | 28 | 12.25 | 78 | 3 | 2/16 | 25.00 | 5.76 | 1 | 0 | |
| 8 | Junie Anthony | 2006 | 2007/08 | 4 | 4 | 2 | 72 | 32* | 36.00 | — | — | — | — | — | 2 | 0 | |
| 9 | Calvin Lewis | 2006 | 2007/08 | 4 | 1 | 0 | 1 | 1 | 1.00 | 78 | 6 | 3/16 | 8.66 | 4.00 | 0 | 0 | |
| 10 | Dane Weston | 2006 | 2007/08 | 4 | 1 | 1 | 0 | 0* | — | 90 | 6 | 2/17 | 40.75 | 3.70 | 1 | 0 | |
| 11 | John Florent | 2006 | 2006 | 2 | 1 | 0 | 1 | 1 | 1.00 | 36 | 2 | 2/18 | 17.00 | 5.66 | 0 | 0 | |
| 12 | Keithroy Cornelius | 2007/08 | 2007/08 | 1 | 0 | 0 | — | — | — | 12 | — | — | — | 12.50 | 1 | 0 | |
| 13 | Andrew Eusebe | 2007/08 | 2007/08 | 2 | 0 | 0 | — | — | — | 36 | 1 | 1/30 | 51.00 | 8.50 | 0 | 0 | |
| 14 | Gaulbert Evans | 2007/08 | 2007/08 | 1 | 1 | 0 | 1 | 1 | 1.00 | — | — | — | — | — | 0 | 0 | |
| 15 | Clifford Fanis | 2007/08 | 2007/08 | 1 | 1 | 0 | 10 | 10 | 10.00 | — | — | — | — | — | 0 | 0 | |
