= List of Sint Maarten Twenty20 players =

From their first match in 2006 to their final match in 2008, seventeen players represented the Sint Maarten national cricket team in Twenty20 (T20) matches in the Stanford 20/20. A Twenty20 is a cricket match between two representative teams of one twenty over innings per side.

Sint Maarten is first recorded fielding a representative team in 2000. In regional domestic cricket, Sint Maarten plays as part of the Leeward Islands cricket team, which holds first-class, List A (neither of which Sint Maarten has ever held) and Twenty20 status. However, for the Stanford 20/20, islands in the Caribbean were allowed to play as separate teams, allowing Sint Maarten the chance to compete with its own team in the 2006 tournament. Sint Maarten played one match in the tournament, in the first round against the United States Virgin Islands, losing by 47 runs and being eliminated from the tournament. Two years later, Sint Maarten took part in the 2008 tournament. They were due to play a preliminary round match against Cuba, however Cuba were barred from participating in the tournament due to the United States embargo against Cuba, which gave Sint Maarten a bye into the first round, where they played Saint Vincent and the Grenadines, losing by 10 runs. Sint Maarten would have taken part in a further tournament to be played in 2009, however its creator Allen Stanford was charged with fraud and arrested in June 2009, bringing an end to the competition. The tournament was then replaced by the Caribbean Twenty20, with only first-class teams allowed to take part. (Note: The first-class domestic teams in the West Indies are: Barbados, Combined Campuses and Colleges, Guyana, Jamaica, Leeward Islands, Trinidad and Tobago and Windward Islands.)

In total, Sint Maarten played two Twenty20 matches, all at the Stanford Cricket Ground, with eight five playing in all three matches. John Eugene scored more runs than any other Sint Maartener with 112, and also has the team's highest individual innings, an unbeaten score of 100. Eugene has also claimed more wickets in Twenty20 matches than any other Sint Maartener with 3, with his 2/45 the team's best individual bowling figures. Two players have captained Sint Maarten in Twenty20 cricket, with Royston Trocard captaining them against the United States Virgin Islands, and Parasram Singh captaining them against Saint Vincent and the Grenadines. while Trocard was the team's wicket-keeper in both matches it played.

This list includes all players who have played at least one Twenty20 match and is initially arranged in the order of debut appearance. Where more than one player won their first cap in the same match, those players are initially listed alphabetically at the time of debut.

== Key ==
General

- ‡ – Captain
- † – Wicket-keeper
- First – Year of debut
- Last – Year of latest game
- Mat – Number of matches played

Batting

- Inn – Number of innings batted
- NO – Number of innings not out
- Runs – Runs scored in career
- HS – Highest score
- Avg – Runs scored per dismissal
- * – Batsman remained not out

Bowling

- Balls – Balls bowled in career
- Wkt – Wickets taken in career
- BBI – Best bowling in an innings
- Ave – Average runs per wicket
- Eco - Average runs conceded per over

Fielding

- Ca – Catches taken
- St – Stumpings taken

== Twenty20 cricketers ==
Sint Maarten Twenty20 cricketers
No.	Name	First	Last	Mat	Inn	NO	Runs	HS	Avg	Balls	Wkt	BBI	Ave	Eco	Ca	St	Ref
No.	Name	First	Last	Mat	Batting					Bowling					Fielding		Ref
1	Royston Trocard †‡	2006	2007/08	2	2	0	44	27	22.00	—	—	—	—	—	1	2	
2	Gary Solomon	2006	2006	1	1	0	0	0	0.00	6	1	1/6	6.00	6.00	0	0	
3	John Eugene	2006	2007/08	2	2	1	112	100*	112.00	48	3	2/45	23.33	8.75	0	0	
4	Romain Doodnauth	2006	2007/08	2	2	0	3	3	1.50	36	1	1/11	11.00	3.83	1	0	
5	Dwayne Elgin	2006	2006	1	1	0	5	5	5.00	—	—	—	—	—	0	0	
6	Steven Evans	2006	2006	1	1	0	39	39	39.00	—	—	—	—	—	1	0	
7	Lionel Ritchie	2006	2007/08	2	2	1	8	7	8.00	40	1	1/15	52.00	7.80	0	0	
8	Marlon Brutus	2006	2006	1	1	0	0	0	0.00	12	1	1/12	12.00	6.00	0	0	
9	Roy Richardson	2006	2006	1	1	0	9	9	9.00	6	—	—	—	11.00	0	0	
10	Larry Baptiste	2006	2006	1	1	0	1	1	1.00	12	—	—	—	16.00	0	0	
11	Parasram Singh ‡	2006	2007/08	2	1	1	1	1*	—	42	—	—	—	5.57	0	0	
12	Sherwin Peters	2007/08	2007/08	1	0	0	9	9	9.00	—	—	—	—	—	0	0	
13	Sherwyn Noble	2007/08	2007/08	1	1	0	0	0	0.00	—	—	—	—	—	0	0	
14	Moreland le Blanc	2007/08	2007/08	1	1	0	4	4	4.00	—	—	—	—	—	0	0	
15	Kenroy David	2007/08	2007/08	1	1	0	8	8	8.00	12	—	—	—	14.50	0	0	
16	Jean-Rene Belizar	2007/08	2007/08	1	1	0	—	—	—	12	—	—	—	9.50	0	0	
17	Keston Dornick	2007/08	2007/08	1	1	0	—	—	—	14	—	—	—	8.57	0	0	
