= Steven Evans (cricketer) =

Personal information
- Full name: Steven Nernez Evans
- Born: 17 September 1967 (age 59)
- Batting: Right-handed
- Role: Wicket-keeper

Domestic team information
- Years: Team
- 2006: Sint Maarten

Career statistics
Competition	Twenty20
Matches	1
Runs scored	39
Batting average	39.00
100s/50s	–/–
Top score	39
Catches/stumpings	1/–
- Source: Cricinfo, 24 May 2015

Steven Nernez Evans (born 17 September 1967) is a former Sint Maartener cricketer.

A right-handed batsman, Evans was selected in Sint Maarten's squad for the 2006 Stanford 20/20, playing in their preliminary round loss to the United States Virgin Islands (USVI). Batting at number six, Evans scored 36 in Sint Maarten's innings, but was dismissed by Calvin Lewis. His was the top-score in Sint Maarten's innings of 98 all out. Earlier in the match he took one catch, helping to dismiss Dale Africa off the bowling of John Eugene. The USVI won the match convincingly by a margin of 47 runs. This marks his only appearance in Twenty20 cricket. He later continued to play minor inter-island matches for Sint Maarten, occasionally playing as the team's wicket-keeper, but was eventually replaced in the side by Mohit Hingorani.

== See also ==
- List of Sint Maarten Twenty20 players
