= Sherwyn Noble =

Guyanese-born Sint Maartener cricketer (born 1976)

Personal information
- Full name: Sherwyn Noble
- Born: 15 August 1976 (age 50); Guyana
- Batting: Right-handed
- Bowling: Right-arm medium-fast

Domestic team information
- Years: Team
- 2007/08: Sint Maarten

Career statistics
Competition	Twenty20
Matches	1
Runs scored	0
Batting average	0.00
100s/50s	–/–
Top score	0
Catches/stumpings	–/–
- Source: Cricinfo, 18 May 2015

Sherwyn Noble (born 15 August 1976) is a Guyanese-born Sint Maartener cricketer.

A right-handed batsman and right-arm medium-fast bowler, Noble was selected in Sint Maarten's squad for the 2008 Stanford 20/20. Having received a bye into the first round after Cuba could not fulfill their preliminary round fixture, Dornick made his Twenty20 debut in the first-round match against Saint Vincent and the Grenadines, which despite an unbeaten century from John Eugene, Sint Maarten lost by 10 runs and were eliminated from the tournament. Noble played in this match as a middle-order batsman, though without success as he was dismissed without scoring by Orlanzo Jackson. This marks Noble's only appearance in Twenty20 cricket.

== See also ==
- List of Sint Maarten Twenty20 players
