= Parasram Singh =

Guyanese-Sint Maartener former cricketer

Personal information
- Full name: Parasram Rishi Singh
- Born: 17 March 1975 (age 51); Georgetown, Guyana
- Nickname: Rishie
- Batting: Right-handed
- Bowling: Slow left-arm orthodox
- Role: Sint Maarten coach

Domestic team information
- Years: Team
- 2006–2007/08: Sint Maarten

Career statistics
Competition	Twenty20
Matches	2
Runs scored	1
Batting average	–
100s/50s	–/–
Top score	1*
Balls bowled	42
Wickets	–
Bowling average	–
5 wickets in innings	–
10 wickets in match	–
Best bowling	–
Catches/stumpings	–/–
- Source: Cricinfo, 17 May 2015

Parasram Rishi Singh (born 17 March 1975) is a Guyanese-born former Sint Maartener cricketer. A right-handed batsman and slow left-arm orthodox bowler, Singh played two Twenty20 matches for the Sint Maarten cricket team.

Singh was born at Georgetown, Guyana, before emigrating to Sint Maarten. He was selected in Sint Maarten's squad for the 2006 Stanford 20/20, making his debut in Twenty20 cricket against the United States Virgin Islands. Singh captained Sint Maarten in this match, during which he bowled four wicket-less overs and scored an unbeaten run coming into bat at number eleven. The United States Virgin Islands won the match by 47 runs, eliminating Sint Maarten from the tournament. He was later selected in Sint Maarten's squad for the second edition of the tournament, although this time the team was captained by Royston Trocard. Having received a bye into the first round after Cuba could not fulfill their preliminary round fixture, Singh featured in the first-round match against Saint Vincent and the Grenadines, which despite an unbeaten century from John Eugene, Sint Maarten lost by 10 runs and were eliminated from the tournament. Having retired as a player, Singh has been the Sint Maarten coach since at least 2009.

== See also ==
- List of Sint Maarten Twenty20 players
