= Moreland le Blanc =

Sint Maarten cricketer

Personal information
- Full name: Moreland Moses le Blanc
- Born: 25 May 1989 (age 37); Sint Maarten
- Batting: Right-handed
- Bowling: Right-arm off-break
- Role: Batsman

Domestic team information
- Years: Team
- 2008: Sint Maarten
- 2011: Leeward Islands

Career statistics
Competition	First-class	Twenty20
Matches	1	1
Runs scored	13	4
Batting average	6.50	4.00
100s/50s	0/0	0/0
Top score	11	4
Balls bowled	4	0
Wickets	0	–
Bowling average	–	–
5 wickets in innings	–	–
10 wickets in match	–	–
Best bowling	–	–
Catches/stumpings	–/–	–/–
- Source: CricketArchive, 5 June 2013

Moreland Moses le Blanc (born 25 May 1989) is a Sint Maarten cricketer who has played at first-class level for the Leeward Islands and at Twenty20 level for Sint Maarten.

Born on the island, le Blanc played for the Leeward Islands under-19 team in the 2007 West Indies Under-19 Challenge, and led the competition's batting averages with 306 runs at an average of 61.20 from five matches. He and Kenroy David were the only Sint Maarteners in the team. After his performance in the tournament, le Blanc was selected to represent Sint Maarten in the 2008 edition of the Stanford 20/20, which featured 21 teams from around the Caribbean region. The team's preliminary round match, against Cuba, was cancelled, and Sint Maarten proceeded straight to the first round of the tournament. In the match, played against Saint Vincent and the Grenadines, le Blanc scored four runs before being dismissed by Alston Bobb, with Sint Maarten losing by ten runs.

Le Blanc spent the 2010 English cricket season with Hoylandswaine in the Drakes Huddersfield League, scoring 395 runs at an average of 56.43. As a citizen of Sint Maarten, he holds a Dutch passport, allowing him to play as a local (i.e., EU) player rather than as an overseas (i.e., non-EU) player under the terms of the Bosman ruling. The following season, he played with Kegworth Town in the Leicestershire Premier League, finishing second in the team's run aggregates with 407 runs from 21 matches. Le Blanc's only other match at a major level was played for the Leeward Islands during the 2010–11 season of the Regional Four Day Competition, against the Windward Islands in March 2011. In the match, played at the Beausejour Stadium near Gros Islet, Saint Lucia, he scored 13 runs for the match. In the team's first innings of 72 all out, le Blanc contributed 11 runs, the most behind Sherwin Peters (also from Sint Maarten). He is yet to play any further matches for the Leewards, but has represented Sint Maarten in inter-island competitions.

== See also ==
- List of Leeward Islands first-class cricketers
