= Gary Solomon (Sint Maarten cricketer) =

Guyanese-born Sint Maarten cricketer (born 1973)

Personal information
- Full name: Gary Mortimer Solomon
- Born: 26 May 1988 (age 38); Guyana
- Batting: Right-handed
- Bowling: Right-arm medium

Domestic team information
- Years: Team
- 2006: Sint Maarten

Career statistics
| Competition | Twenty20 |
|---|---|
| Matches | 1 |
| Runs scored | 0 |
| Batting average | 0.00 |
| 100s/50s | –/– |
| Top score | 0 |
| Balls bowled | 6 |
| Wickets | 1 |
| Bowling average | 6.00 |
| 5 wickets in innings | – |
| 10 wickets in match | – |
| Best bowling | 1/6 |
| Catches/stumpings | –/– |
- Source: Cricinfo, 17 May 2015

Gary Mortimer Solomon (born 15 September 1973) is a Guyanese-born Sint Maartener cricketer.

A right-handed batsman and right-arm medium pace bowler, Solomon was selected in Sint Maarten's squad for the 2006 Stanford 20/20, playing in their preliminary round loss to the United States Virgin Islands (USVI). Opening the batting alongside Royston Trocard, Solomon was dismissed without scoring by Dane Weston. In the USVI innings he bowled a single over, taking the wicket of Mark Vitalis and conceding six runs. This marks Solomon's only appearance in Twenty20 cricket.

== See also ==
- List of Sint Maarten Twenty20 players
