= Jean-Rene Belizar =

Sint Maartener cricketer (born 1988)

Personal information
- Full name: Jean-Rene Baby Belizar
- Born: 2 August 1988 (age 38); Sint Maarten
- Batting: Right-handed
- Bowling: Right-arm off break

Domestic team information
- Years: Team
- 2007/08: Sint Maarten

Career statistics
Competition	Twenty20
Matches	1
Runs scored	–
Batting average	–
100s/50s	–/–
Top score	–
Balls bowled	12
Wickets	–
Bowling average	–
5 wickets in innings	–
10 wickets in match	–
Best bowling	–
Catches/stumpings	–/–
- Source: Cricinfo, 17 May 2015

Jean-Rene Baby Belizar (born 2 August 1988) is a Sint Maartener cricketer.

A right-handed batsman and right-arm off break bowler, Belizar was selected in Sint Maarten's squad for the 2008 Stanford 20/20. Having received a bye into the first round after Cuba could not fulfill their preliminary round fixture, Belizar made his Twenty20 debut in the first-round match against Saint Vincent and the Grenadines, which despite an unbeaten century from John Eugene, Sint Maarten lost by 10 runs and were eliminated from the tournament. This marks Belizar's only appearance in Twenty20 cricket. He later played for Sint Maarten in the semi-final of the 2009 Leeward Islands Tournament against Antigua and Barbuda.

== See also ==
- List of Sint Maarten Twenty20 players
