= Keston Dornick =

Guyanese-born Sint Maartener cricketer

Personal information
- Full name: Keston Desmond Dornick
- Born: 26 May 1988 (age 38); Guyana
- Batting: Right-handed
- Bowling: Right-arm medium-fast

Domestic team information
- Years: Team
- 2007/08: Sint Maarten

Career statistics
Competition	Twenty20
Matches	1
Runs scored	–
Batting average	–
100s/50s	–/–
Top score	–
Balls bowled	14
Wickets	–
Bowling average	–
5 wickets in innings	–
10 wickets in match	–
Best bowling	–
Catches/stumpings	–/–
- Source: Cricinfo, 17 May 2015

Keston Desmond Dornick (born 26 May 1988) is a Guyanese-born Sint Maartener cricketer.

A right-handed batsman and right-arm medium-fast bowler, Dornick played at under-19 level for the Leeward Islands in 2006. He was later selected in Sint Maarten's squad for the 2008 Stanford 20/20. Having received a bye into the first round after Cuba could not fulfill their preliminary round fixture, Dornick made his Twenty20 debut in the first-round match against Saint Vincent and the Grenadines, which despite an unbeaten century from John Eugene, Sint Maarten lost by 10 runs and were eliminated from the tournament. This marks Dornick's only appearance in Twenty20 cricket.

== See also ==
- List of Sint Maarten Twenty20 players
