= Junie Anthony =

West Indian cricketer (born 1968)

Personal information
- Full name: Junie Massiah Anthony
- Born: 29 November 1968 (age 57)
- Batting: Right-handed

Domestic team information
- Years: Team
- 2006–2007/08: United States Virgin Islands

Career statistics
Competition	Twenty20
Matches	4
Runs scored	72
Batting average	36.00
100s/50s	–/–
Top score	32*
Catches/stumpings	2/–
- Source: Cricinfo, 11 January 2013

Junie Massiah Anthony (born 29 November 1968) is a former West Indian cricketer. Anthony was a right-handed batsman.

In February 2006, Anthony played for the United States Virgin Islands in the 2006 Stanford 20/20, whose matches held official Twenty20 status. He made two appearances in the tournament, in a preliminary round victory against St Maarten and in a first-round defeat against St Vincent and the Grenadines. He later played for the United States Virgin Islands in their second appearance in the Stanford 20/20 in 2008, making two appearances in a preliminary round victory against St Kitts and in a first-round defeat against Antigua and Barbuda. In his four Twenty20 matches, he scored a total of 72 runs at an average of 36.00 and a high score of 32 not out.
