= Alderman Lesmond =

United States Virgin Islands sportsman

Personal information
- Full name: Alderman Rowe Nicholas Lesmond
- Born: 7 July 1978 (age 48); Micoud, Saint Lucia
- Height: 1.78 m (5 ft 10 in)
- Batting: Left-handed
- Role: Wicket-keeper

Domestic team information
- Years: Team
- 2006–2007/08: United States Virgin Islands
- 2005/06: Leeward Islands

Career statistics
Competition	FC	LA	T20
Matches	4	6	4
Runs scored	38	11	26
Batting average	7.60	–	6.50
100s/50s	0/0	–	0/0
Top score	13*	10*	14
Catches/stumpings	6/–	8/–	3/2
- Source: Cricinfo, 19 October 2019
Association football career
- Position: Striker
Senior career*
Years	Team	Apps	(Gls)
2003–?	Helenites		
International career^{‡}
2011	United States Virgin Islands	3	(1)
- * Club domestic league appearances and goals ‡ National team caps and goals as of 26 November 2014

Alderman Rowe Nicholas Lesmond (born 7 July 1978) is an American Virgin Islander sportsman who has played both cricket and soccer for his country. He was born in Saint Lucia.

A wicket-keeper and left-handed batsman, Lesmond made his first-class cricket debut for the Leeward Islands against Jamaica in the 2005–06 Carib Beer Cup. He made three further first-class appearances for the team, the last of which came against Barbados in the same season. In his four first-class matches, he scored 38 runs at an average of 7.60, with a high score of 13 not out. He also played List A cricket for the Leeward Islands, making his debut in that format against Jamaica in the 2005–06 KFC Cup. He made five further List A appearances for the team, the last of which came against Guyana in the same tournament. In six List A appearances, he scored 11 with a high score of 10 not out.

In February 2006, Lesmond played for the United States Virgin Islands in the 2006 Stanford 20/20, whose matches held official Twenty20 status. He made two appearances in the tournament, in a preliminary round victory against Sint Maarten and in a first-round defeat against St Vincent and the Grenadines. He later played for the United States Virgin Islands in their second appearance in the Stanford 20/20 in 2008, making two appearances in a preliminary round victory against St Kitts and in a first-round defeat against Antigua and Barbuda. In his four appearances, he scored a total of 26 runs at an average of 6.50 and a high score of 14. Behind the stumps he took three catches and made two stumping.

Lesmond has also played for the United States Virgin Islands soccer team, as well as club soccer for the Helenites. He made his international soccer debut in a 19 June 2011 friendly match against Anguilla. Lesmond scored a goal in the U.S. Virgin Islands' 2014 World Cup Qualification win against the British Virgin Islands in July 2011. It was the team's first win in thirteen years.

== Soccer career statistics ==
=== International ===
Appearances and goals by national team and year
National team	Year	Apps	Goals
United States Virgin Islands	2011	3	1
Total		3	1

Scores and results list the United States Virgin Islands' goal tally first, score column indicates score after each Lesmond goal.

List of international goals scored by Alderman Lesmond
No.	Date	Venue	Opponent	Score	Result	Competition
1	July 3, 2011	Lionel Roberts Stadium, Charlotte Amalie, United States Virgin Islands	British Virgin Islands	1–0	2–0	2014 FIFA World Cup qualification
