= Calvin Lewis =

West Indian cricketer

Personal information
- Full name: Calvin Anthony Lewis
- Born: 23 March 1965 (age 61)
- Batting: Right-handed
- Bowling: Right-arm off break

Domestic team information
- Years: Team
- 2006–2007/08: United States Virgin Islands

Career statistics
Competition	Twenty20
Matches	4
Runs scored	1
Batting average	1.00
100s/50s	–/–
Top score	1
Balls bowled	78
Wickets	6
Bowling average	8.66
5 wickets in innings	–
10 wickets in match	–
Best bowling	3/16
Catches/stumpings	–/–
- Source: Cricinfo, 11 January 2013

Calvin Anthony Lewis (born 23 March 1965) is a former West Indian cricketer. Lewis was a right-handed batsman who bowled right-arm off break.

In February 2006, Lewis played for the United States Virgin Islands in the 2006 Stanford 20/20, whose matches held official Twenty20 status. He made two appearances in the tournament, in a preliminary round victory against St Maarten and in a first-round defeat against St Vincent and the Grenadines. He took 3 wickets during the tournament at an average of 5.66 and with best figures of 2/7. He later played for the United States Virgin Islands in their second appearance in the Stanford 20/20 in 2008, making two appearances in a preliminary round victory against St Kitts and in a first-round defeat against Antigua and Barbuda. He again took 3 wickets in the tournament, at an average of 11.66 and with best figures of 3/16. His total of 6 wickets for the United States Virgin Islands makes him the teams joint–leading wicket taker alongside Dane Weston, though Lewis took his wickets at a better average.
