= Marlon Brutus =

Sint Maartener cricketer

Personal information
- Full name: Marlon Chenjeria Brutus
- Born: 10 October 1980 (age 46)
- Batting: Right-handed
- Bowling: Left-arm medium-fast

Domestic team information
- Years: Team
- 2006: Sint Maarten

Career statistics
Competition	Twenty20
Matches	1
Runs scored	0
Batting average	0.00
100s/50s	–/–
Top score	0
Balls bowled	12
Wickets	1
Bowling average	12.00
5 wickets in innings	–
10 wickets in match	–
Best bowling	1/12
Catches/stumpings	–/–
- Source: Cricinfo, 23 May 2015

Marlon Chenjeria Brutus (born 10 October 1980) is a Sint Maartener cricketer.

A right-handed batsman and left-arm fast-medium bowler, Brutus was selected in Sint Maarten's squad for the 2006 Stanford 20/20, playing in their preliminary round loss to the United States Virgin Islands (USVI). In the USVI innings he bowled two overs which conceded 12 runs, but he did take the wicket of Terrance Webbe with the fourth ball of the tournament. Batting at number eight, Brutus was dismissed without scoring by John Florent. This marks his only appearance in Twenty20 cricket. As of October 2014, Brutus was playing minor inter-island matches for Sint Maarten.

== See also ==
- List of Sint Maarten Twenty20 players
