= Clifford Walwyn =

West Indian cricketer

Personal information
- Full name: Clifford Wendell Walwyn
- Born: 22 May 1964 (age 62); Brown Hill, Saint John, Nevis
- Batting: Right-handed
- Bowling: Right-arm off break

Domestic team information
- Years: Team
- 2006–2007/08: United States Virgin Islands
- 1993/94–1994/95: Leeward Islands

Career statistics
Competition	FC	LA	T20
Matches	7	6	4
Runs scored	300	91	68
Batting average	27.27	18.20	17.00
100s/50s	–/2	–/–	–/–
Top score	80	32	40
Catches/stumpings	2/–	1/–	–/–
- Source: Cricinfo, 13 January 2013

Clifford Wendell Walwyn (born 22 May 1964) is a former West Indian cricketer. Walwyn was a right-handed batsman who bowled right-arm off break. He was born at Brown Hill, Nevis.

Walwyn made his first-class debut for the Leeward Islands against Barbados in the 1993/94 Red Stripe Bowl. He made six further first-class appearances for the team, the last of which came against Jamaica in the 1994/95 Red Stripe Bowl. In his seven first-class matches, he scored 300 runs at an average of 27.27, with two half centuries and a high score of 80, which came against Trinidad and Tobago at Sturge Park in the 1993/94 Red Stripe Bowl. He also played List A cricket for the Leeward Islands, making his debut in that format against Barbados in the 1993/94 Geddes Grant Shield. He made five further List A appearances for the team, the last of which came against Barbados in the final of the same tournament, which the Leeward Islands won. In six List A appearances, he scored 91 runs at an average of 18.20, with a high score of 32.

In February 2006, Walwyn played for the United States Virgin Islands in the 2006 Stanford 20/20, whose matches held official Twenty20 status. He made two appearances in the tournament, in a preliminary round victory against St Maarten and in a first-round defeat against St Vincent and the Grenadines. He later played for the United States Virgin Islands in their second appearance in the Stanford 20/20 in 2008, making two appearances in a preliminary round victory against St Kitts and in a first-round defeat against Antigua and Barbuda. In his four appearances, he scored a total of 68 runs at an average of 17.00 and a high score of 40.
