= Dane Weston =

Antiguan cricketer

Personal information
- Full name: Dane Anderson Weston
- Born: 2 February 1973 (age 53); All Saints, Antigua and Barbuda
- Batting: Right-handed
- Bowling: Right-arm fast

Domestic team information
- Years: Team
- 2006–2007/08: United States Virgin Islands
- 2003/04: Leeward Islands

Career statistics
Competition	First-class	Twenty20
Matches	2	4
Runs scored	1	0
Batting average	1.00	–
100s/50s	–/–	–/–
Top score	1*	0*
Balls bowled	264	90
Wickets	4	6
Bowling average	40.75	15.66
5 wickets in innings	–	–
10 wickets in match	–	–
Best bowling	2/17	2/14
Catches/stumpings	1/–	1/–
- Source: Cricinfo, 11 January 2013

Dane Anderson Weston (born 2 February 1973) is a former Antiguan cricketer. Weston was a right-handed batsman who bowled right-arm fast. He was born at All Saints, Antigua.

Weston made two first-class appearances for the Leeward Islands in the 2003/04 Carib Beer Cup against Trinidad and Tobago and Jamaica. He took a total of 4 wickets in his two matches, which came at an average of 40.75, with best figures of 2/17.

Later in August 2006, Weston played for the United States Virgin Islands in the 2006 Stanford 20/20, whose matches held official Twenty20 status. Weston made two appearances in the tournament, in a preliminary round victory against Sint Maarten and in a first-round defeat against St Vincent and the Grenadines. He took 3 wickets during the tournament at an average of 17.33 and with best figures of 2/23. He later played for the United States Virgin Islands in their second appearance in the Stanford 20/20 in 2008, making two appearances in a preliminary round victory against St Kitts and in a first-round defeat against Antigua and Barbuda. He again took 3 wickets in the tournament, at an average of 14.00 and with best figures of 2/14. His total of 6 wickets for the United States Virgin Islands makes him the teams joint–leading wicket taker alongside Calvin Lewis.
