= Dwayne Elgin =

Guyanese cricketer (born 1976)

Personal information
- Full name: Dwayne Anthony Elgin
- Born: 27 July 1979 (age 47); Guyana
- Batting: Right-handed
- Bowling: Right-arm medium

Domestic team information
- Years: Team
- 2006: Sint Maarten

Career statistics
Competition	Twenty20
Matches	1
Runs scored	5
Batting average	5.00
100s/50s	–/–
Top score	5
Catches/stumpings	–/–
- Source: Cricinfo, 24 May 2015

Dwayne Anthony Elgin (born 10 March 1976) is a Guyanese-born Sint Maartener cricketer and insurance CEO.

A right-handed batsman and right-arm medium pace bowler, Elgin was selected in Sint Maarten's squad for the 2006 Stanford 20/20, playing in their preliminary round loss to the United States Virgin Islands (USVI). Batting at number five, Elgin was dismissed for 5 runs by Terrance Webbe, with the USVI winning the match by 47 runs and eliminating Sint Maarten from the tournament. This marks Elgin's only appearance in Twenty20 cricket. Outside of cricket he is the CEO of NAGICO Insurances, which sponsors the West Indian domestic Regional Super50.

== See also ==
- List of Sint Maarten Twenty20 players
