= Dale Africa =

West Indian cricketer (born 1981)

Personal information
- Full name: Dale Garfieldson Africa
- Born: 14 September 1981 (age 45)
- Batting: Right-handed
- Bowling: Right-arm slow-medium

Domestic team information
- Years: Team
- 2006: United States Virgin Islands

Career statistics
Competition	Twenty20
Matches	2
Runs scored	17
Batting average	8.50
100s/50s	–/–
Top score	15
Catches/stumpings	–/–
- Source: Cricinfo, 7 January 2013

Dale Garfieldson Africa (born 14 September 1981) is a West Indian cricketer. Africa is a right-handed batsman who bowls right-arm slow-medium.

In February 2006, the United States Virgin Islands were invited to take part in the 2006 Stanford 20/20, whose matches held official Twenty20 status. Africa made two appearances in the tournament, in a preliminary round victory against St Maarten and in a first-round defeat against St Vincent and the Grenadines. Against St Maarten he scored 15 runs from 10 balls, before being dismissed by John Eugene. Against St Vincent and the Grenadines he was dismissed for a 2 runs by Kenroy Martin.
