= Roy Richardson =

Sint Maartener cricketer

Personal information
- Full name: Roy Adrien Richardson
- Born: 5 April 1963 (age 63)
- Batting: Right-handed
- Bowling: Right-arm medium

Domestic team information
- Years: Team
- 2006: Sint Maarten

Career statistics
| Competition | Twenty20 |
|---|---|
| Matches | 1 |
| Runs scored | 9 |
| Batting average | 9.00 |
| 100s/50s | –/– |
| Top score | 9 |
| Balls bowled | 6 |
| Wickets | – |
| Bowling average | – |
| 5 wickets in innings | – |
| 10 wickets in match | – |
| Best bowling | – |
| Catches/stumpings | –/– |
- Source: Cricinfo, 23 May 2015

Roy Adrien Richardson (born 5 April 1963) is a former Sint Maartener cricketer.

A right-handed batsman and right-arm medium pace bowler, Richardson was selected in Sint Maarten's squad for the 2006 Stanford 20/20, playing in their preliminary round loss to the United States Virgin Islands (USVI). His debut at the age of 43 years and 97 days makes him one of the oldest players to appear in Twenty20 cricket. Batting at number nine, Richardson was dismissed for 9 runs by Sherville Huggins, while in the USVI innings he bowled one over which conceded 11 runs, but failed to take a wicket. This marks Richardson's only appearance in Twenty20 cricket Roy Richardson is one of only two cricketers to be born in Sint Maarten the other is Keacy Carty who later became the first and only Sint Maarten cricketer to be selected for the West Indies

== See also ==
- List of Sint Maarten Twenty20 players
