= Larry Baptiste =

Grenadian-born Sint Maartener cricketer

Personal information
- Full name: Larry Baptiste
- Born: 10 August 1978 (age 48); Tivoli, Grenada
- Batting: Right-handed
- Bowling: Right-arm off break

Domestic team information
- Years: Team
- 2006: Sint Maarten

Career statistics
Competition	Twenty20
Matches	1
Runs scored	1
Batting average	1.00
100s/50s	–/–
Top score	1
Balls bowled	12
Wickets	–
Bowling average	–
5 wickets in innings	–
10 wickets in match	–
Best bowling	–
Catches/stumpings	–/–
- Source: Cricinfo, 22 May 2015

Larry Baptiste (born 10 August 1978) is a Sint Maartener cricketer.

A right-handed batsman and right-arm off break bowler, Baptiste was selected in Sint Maarten's squad for the 2006 Stanford 20/20, playing in their preliminary round loss to the United States Virgin Islands (USVI). Batting at number ten, Baptiste was dismissed for a single run by Sherville Huggins, while in the USVI innings he bowled two overs which conceded 16 runs, but failed to take a wicket. This marks Baptiste's only appearance in Twenty20 cricket. He has since played minor inter-island matches for Sint Maarten.

== See also ==
- List of Sint Maarten Twenty20 players
