= Kenroy David =

Guyanese-born Sint Maartener cricketer

Personal information
- Full name: Kenroy Chuck David
- Born: 6 November 1989 (age 37); Guyana
- Batting: Right-handed
- Bowling: Right-arm medium-fast
- Role: Sint Maarten captain

Domestic team information
- Years: Team
- 2007/08: Sint Maarten

Career statistics
Competition	Twenty20
Matches	1
Runs scored	8
Batting average	8.00
100s/50s	–/–
Top score	8
Balls bowled	12
Wickets	–
Bowling average	–
5 wickets in innings	–
10 wickets in match	–
Best bowling	–
Catches/stumpings	–/–
- Source: Cricinfo, 17 May 2015

Kenroy Chuck David (born 6 November 1989) is a Guyanese-born Sint Maartener cricketer.

A right-handed batsman and right-arm medium-fast bowler, Dornick played at under-19 level for the Leeward Islands in 2007 and 2008. He was later selected in Sint Maarten's squad for the 2008 Stanford 20/20. Having received a bye into the first round after Cuba could not fulfill their preliminary round fixture, Dornick made his Twenty20 debut in the first-round match against Saint Vincent and the Grenadines, which despite an unbeaten century from John Eugene, Sint Maarten lost by 10 runs and were eliminated from the tournament. David bowled two overs in the match, which conceded 29 runs, and with the bat he scored 8 runs, before being dismissed by Kenroy Peters. This marks David's only appearance in Twenty20 cricket. As of September 2014, he captains Sint Maarten in minor inter-island matches.

== See also ==
- List of Sint Maarten Twenty20 players
