= Terrance Webbe =

Personal information
- Full name: Terrance Godfrey Webbe
- Born: 30 April 1969 (age 57)
- Batting: Right-handed
- Bowling: Right-arm off break

Domestic team information
- Years: Team
- 2006–2007/08: United States Virgin Islands

Career statistics
Competition	Twenty20
Matches	4
Runs scored	12
Batting average	6.00
100s/50s	–/–
Top score	7*
Balls bowled	60
Wickets	2
Bowling average	36.00
5 wickets in innings	–
10 wickets in match	–
Best bowling	1/20
Catches/stumpings	1/–
- Source: Cricinfo, 13 January 2013

Terrance Godfrey Webbe (born 30 April 1969) is a former West Indian cricketer. Webbe was a right-handed batsman who bowled right-arm off break.

In February 2006, Webbe played for the United States Virgin Islands in the 2006 Stanford 20/20, whose matches held official Twenty20 status. He made two appearances in the tournament, in a preliminary round victory against St Maarten and in a first-round defeat against St Vincent and the Grenadines. He later played for the United States Virgin Islands in their second appearance in the Stanford 20/20 in 2008, making two appearances in a preliminary round victory against St Kitts and in a first-round defeat against Antigua and Barbuda. In his four appearances, he scored a total of 12 runs at an average of 6.00 and a high score of 7 not out, while with the ball he took 2 wickets at a bowling average of 36.00 and best figures of 1/20.
