= Sherville Huggins =

West Indian cricketer

Personal information
- Full name: Sherville Alister Huggins
- Born: 22 May 1972 (age 54); Basseterre, Saint Kitts and Nevis
- Batting: Right-handed
- Bowling: Right-arm slow-medium

Domestic team information
- Years: Team
- 2006–2007/08: United States Virgin Islands

Career statistics
Competition	Twenty20
Matches	4
Runs scored	146
Batting average	48.66
100s/50s	–/1
Top score	51
Balls bowled	48
Wickets	3
Bowling average	20.33
5 wickets in innings	–
10 wickets in match	–
Best bowling	2/17
Catches/stumpings	–/–
- Source: Cricinfo, 12 January 2013

Sherville Alister Huggins (born 22 May 1972) is a former West Indian cricketer. Huggins was a right-handed batsman who bowled right-arm slow-medium. He was born at Basseterre, Saint Kitts and Nevis.

In February 2006, Huggins played for the United States Virgin Islands in the 2006 Stanford 20/20, whose matches held official Twenty20 status. He made two appearances in the tournament, in a preliminary round victory against Sint Maarten and in a first-round defeat against St Vincent and the Grenadines. He later played for the United States Virgin Islands in their second appearance in the Stanford 20/20 in 2008, making two appearances in a preliminary round victory against St Kitts and in a first-round defeat against Antigua and Barbuda. He captained the team in its four Twenty20 matches, scoring a total of 146 runs at an average of 48.66 and a high score of 51 against St Maarten. He was the team's leading run-scorer in its four Twenty20 appearances, as well as the only United States Virgin Islands player to pass fifty runs in an innings. He also took 3 wickets with the ball, at a bowling average of 20.33 and best figures of 2/17.
