= Mark Vitalis =

West Indian cricketer

Personal information
- Full name: Mark Canice Vitalis
- Born: 22 October 1968 (age 58)
- Batting: Right-handed
- Bowling: Right-arm off break

Domestic team information
- Years: Team
- 2006–2007/08: United States Virgin Islands

Career statistics
Competition	Twenty20
Matches	3
Runs scored	24
Batting average	8.00
100s/50s	–/–
Top score	13
Catches/stumpings	1/–
- Source: Cricinfo, 12 January 2013

Mark Canice Vitalis (born 22 October 1968) is a former West Indian cricketer. Vitalis was a right-handed batsman who bowled right-arm off break.

In February 2006, Vitalis played for the United States Virgin Islands in the 2006 Stanford 20/20, whose matches held official Twenty20 status. He made two appearances in the tournament, in a preliminary round victory against Sint Maarten and in a first-round defeat against St Vincent and the Grenadines. He later played for the United States Virgin Islands in their second appearance in the Stanford 20/20 in 2008, making a single appearance in a preliminary round victory against St Kitts. In his three Twenty20 matches, he scored a total of 24 runs at an average of 8.00 and a high score of 13.
