= Kenroy =

Kenroy may refer to:

Given name

- Kenroy David (born 1989), Sint Maarten cricket player
- Kenroy Howell (born 1993), Jamaican football player
- Kenroy Martin (born 1979), St Vincent and the Grenadines cricket player
- Kenroy Peters (born 1982), St Vincent and the Grenadines cricket player
- Kenroy Smith, Antigua and Barbuda football player
- Kenroy Williams (born 1984), Barbados cricket player
