= Andrew Eusebe =

West Indian cricketer

Personal information
- Full name: Andrew Eusebe
- Born: 5 May 1985 (age 41)
- Batting: Right-handed
- Bowling: Right-arm medium

Domestic team information
- Years: Team
- 2007/08: United States Virgin Islands

Career statistics
Competition	Twenty20
Matches	2
Runs scored	–
Batting average	–
100s/50s	–/–
Top score	–
Balls bowled	36
Wickets	1
Bowling average	51.00
5 wickets in innings	–
10 wickets in match	–
Best bowling	1/30
Catches/stumpings	–/–
- Source: Cricinfo, 6 January 2013

Andrew Eusebe (born 5 March 1985) is a West Indian cricketer. Eusebe is a right-handed batsman who bowls right-arm medium pace.

In February 2008, the United States Virgin Islands were invited to take part in the 2008 Stanford 20/20, whose matches held official Twenty20 status. Eusebe made two appearances in the tournament, in a preliminary round victory against St Kitts where he took the wicket of Jason Saddler to take figures of 1/30, and in a first-round defeat against Antigua and Barbuda. He wasn't required to bat in either match.
