= Royston Trocard =

Dominican cricketer (born 1967)

Personal information
- Full name: Royston Trocard
- Born: 17 September 1967 (age 59); Dominica
- Batting: Right-handed
- Role: Wicket-keeper

Domestic team information
- Years: Team
- 2006–2007/08: Sint Maarten

Career statistics
Competition	Twenty20
Matches	2
Runs scored	44
Batting average	22.00
100s/50s	–/–
Top score	27
Catches/stumpings	1/2
- Source: Cricinfo, 9 March 2012

Royston Trocard (born 17 September 1967) is a Dominican-born former cricketer who played for Sint Maarten. Trocard was a right-handed batsman who fielded as a wicket-keeper.

Trocard played two Twenty20 matches for Sint Maarten. The first of these came against the United States Virgin Islands in the 2006 Stanford 20/20 at the Stanford Cricket Ground. Trocard made two stumpings in this match, while with the bat he scored 17 runs before being run out by Clifford Walwyn. The United States Virgin Islands won the match by 47 runs. His second Twenty20 appearance came against Saint Vincent and the Grenadines in the 2008 Stanford 20/20. He took a single catch in this match, while with the bat he scored 27 runs before he was dismissed by Orlanzo Jackson. St Vincent and the Grenadines won the match by 10 runs.
