= John Florent =

United States Virgin Islands cricketer (born 1977)

Personal information
- Full name: John Florent
- Born: 13 February 1977 (age 49)
- Batting: Right-handed
- Bowling: Right-arm slow-medium

Domestic team information
- Years: Team
- 2006: United States Virgin Islands

Career statistics
Competition	Twenty20
Matches	2
Runs scored	1
Batting average	1.00
100s/50s	–/–
Top score	1
Balls bowled	36
Wickets	2
Bowling average	17.00
5 wickets in innings	–
10 wickets in match	–
Best bowling	2/18
Catches/stumpings	–/–
- Source: Cricinfo, 7 January 2013

John Florent (born 13 February 1977) is a West Indian cricketer. Florent is a right-handed batsman who bowls right-arm slow-medium.

In February 2006, the United States Virgin Islands were invited to take part in the 2006 Stanford 20/20, whose matches held official Twenty20 status. Florent made two appearances in the tournament, in a preliminary round victory against Sint Maarten and in a first-round defeat against St Vincent and the Grenadines. Against St Maarten he wasn't required to bat, while with the ball he took the wickets of Lionel Ritchie and Marlon Brutus to finish with figures of 2/18 from four overs. Against St Vincent and the Grenadines he was dismissed for a single run by Nixon McLean, while with the ball he bowled two wicketless overs which cost 16 runs.
