= Philern Davis =

British Virgin Islands cricketer

Personal information
- Full name: Philern Junville Davis
- Born: 11 May 1982 (age 44)
- Batting: Right-handed

Domestic team information
- Years: Team
- 2006: British Virgin Islands

Career statistics
Competition	Twenty20
Matches	1
Runs scored	1
Batting average	1.00
100s/50s	–/–
Top score	1
Balls bowled	–
Wickets	–
Bowling average	–
5 wickets in innings	–
10 wickets in match	–
Best bowling	–
Catches/stumpings	–/–
- Source: Cricinfo, 13 January 2013

Philern Junville Davis (born 11 May 1982) is a British Virgin Islands cricketer. Davis is a right-handed batsman.

In 2006, the British Virgin Islands were invited to take part in the 2006 Stanford 20/20, whose matches held official Twenty20 status. Davis made a single appearance in the tournament against Saint Lucia in a preliminary round defeat, with Davis being run out for a single run by the combination of Garey Mathurin and Mervin Charles.
