= Vijay Jhappan =

British Virgin Islands cricketer (born 1975)

Personal information
- Full name: Vijay Jhappan
- Born: 30 March 1975 (age 51)
- Batting: Right-handed
- Bowling: Right-arm medium

Domestic team information
- Years: Team
- 2006: British Virgin Islands

Career statistics
Competition	Twenty20
Matches	1
Runs scored	0
Batting average	0.00
100s/50s	–/–
Top score	0
Balls bowled	–
Wickets	–
Bowling average	–
5 wickets in innings	–
10 wickets in match	–
Best bowling	–
Catches/stumpings	–/–
- Source: Cricinfo, 13 January 2013

Vijay Jhappan (born 30 March 1975) is a former British Virgin Islands cricketer. Jhappan was a right-handed batsman who bowled right-arm medium pace.

In 2006, the British Virgin Islands were invited to take part in the 2006 Stanford 20/20, whose matches held official Twenty20 status. Jhappan made a single appearance in the tournament against Saint Lucia in a preliminary round defeat, with Jhappan being run out for a duck by Mervin Charles.
