= Dorian Auguiste =

Dominican-born British Virgin Islands cricketer (born 1980)

Personal information
- Full name: Dorian Craig Auguiste
- Born: 28 October 1980 (age 46); Dominica
- Batting: Left-handed
- Bowling: Right-handed off break

Domestic team information
- Years: Team
- 2007/08: British Virgin Islands

Career statistics
Competition	Twenty20
Matches	1
Runs scored	5
Batting average	5.00
100s/50s	–/–
Top score	5
Balls bowled	–
Wickets	–
Bowling average	–
5 wickets in innings	–
10 wickets in match	–
Best bowling	–
Catches/stumpings	–/–
- Source: Cricinfo, 13 January 2013

Dorian Craig Auguiste (born 28 October 1980) is a Dominica-born former British Virgin Islands cricketer. Auguiste was a left-handed batsman who bowled right-arm off break.

In February 2008, the British Virgin Islands were invited to take part in the 2008 Stanford 20/20, whose matches held official Twenty20 status. Auguiste made a single appearance in the tournament against Dominica in a preliminary round defeat, with Auguiste being dismissed for 5 runs by Liam Sebastien.
