= Gaulbert Evans =

West Indian cricketer (born 1965)

Personal information
- Full name: Gaulbert Evans
- Born: 12 May 1965 (age 61)
- Batting: Unknown
- Bowling: Unknown

Domestic team information
- Years: Team
- 2007/08: United States Virgin Islands

Career statistics
Competition	Twenty20
Matches	1
Runs scored	1
Batting average	1.00
100s/50s	–/–
Top score	1.00
Catches/stumpings	–/–
- Source: Cricinfo, 6 January 2013

Gaulbert Evans (born 12 May 1965) is a former West Indian cricketer. Evans' batting and bowling styles are unknown.

In February 2008, the United States Virgin Islands were invited to participate in the 2008 Stanford 20/20, whose matches held official Twenty20 status. Evans made a single appearance for the United States Virgin Islands in their first-round match against Antigua and Barbuda, with their opponents winning by 24 runs. He made a single run in the match before being dismissed by Carl Simon.
