= Donwell Hector =

West Indian cricketer

Personal information
- Full name: Donwell Banister Hector
- Born: 31 October 1988 (age 38); Saint Vincent
- Batting: Right-handed
- Bowling: Right-arm off spin

Domestic team information
- Years: Team
- 2007–2017: Windward Islands
- FC debut: 4 January 2008 Windward Islands v Barbados
- Last FC: 14 December 2017 Windward Islands v Jamaica
- LA debut: 16 October 2007 Windward Islands v Guyana
- Last LA: 16 October 2010 Windward Islands v Combined Campuses and College

Career statistics
Competition	FC	LA	T20
Matches	26	6	3
Runs scored	760	86	17
Batting average	17.27	14.33	5.66
100s/50s	0/3	0/0	0/0
Top score	99	37	11
Catches/stumpings	36/0	4/0	1/0
- Source: ESPNcricinfo, 5 August 2019

Donwell Banister Hector (born 31 October 1988) is a Vincentian cricketer who has played for the Windward Islands in West Indian domestic cricket. He is a right-handed middle-order batsman.

Hector made his senior debut for the Windwards in October 2007, playing a limited-overs game against Guyana during the 2007–08 KFC Cup. His first-class debut came a few months later, in January 2008, against Barbados in the 2007–08 Carib Beer Cup. Later in 2008, Hector was selected for the Saint Vincent and Grenadines national team in two matches in the Stanford 20/20 tournament, which held full Twenty20 status. He had little success, scoring six runs against Sint Maarten and a golden duck against Trinidad and Tobago. During the 2008–09 Regional Four Day Competition, Hector scored 393 runs from eight matches, ranking him fourth for runs among his teammates (behind Rawl Lewis, Darren Sammy, and Andre Fletcher). His season included three half-centuries – 99 against Trinidad and Tobago, 79 not out against Guyana, and 67 against the Leeward Islands. However, his form tapered off in later seasons.
