= Keithroy Cornelius =

West Indian cricketer (born 1968)

Personal information
- Born: 3 May 1968 (age 58); Charlotte Amalie, United States Virgin Islands
- Batting: Right-handed
- Bowling: Right-arm fast

Domestic team information
- Years: Team
- 2007/08: United States Virgin Islands

Career statistics
Competition	Twenty20
Matches	1
Runs scored	0
Batting average	0.00
100s/50s	–/–
Top score	0
Catches/stumpings	–/–
- Source: Cricinfo, 6 January 2013

Keithroy Cornelius (born 3 May 1968) is a former West Indian cricketer. Cornelius was a right-handed batsman who bowled right-arm fast. He also played association football for the United States Virgin Islands football team between 2004 and 2011.

In February 2008, the United States Virgin Islands were invited to take part in the 2008 Stanford 20/20, whose matches held official Twenty20 status. Cornelius made a single appearance for the team in their preliminary round match against St Kitts. In a match which they won by 4 wickets, he bowled two expensive wicketless overs which cost 20 runs, while with the bat he was dismissed for a duck by Elsroy Powell.

In football, Cornelius made six appearances for the United States Virgin Islands, the last of which came in a 6–1 defeat to Curaçao in a 2014 World Cup qualifier on 15 November 2011, in which he scored his team's only goal, becoming, at the age of 43 years and 196 days, the oldest-ever international goalscorer in world football, breaking the 17-year-old record set by Roger Milla in the 1994 World Cup at the age of 42 years and 39 days. Some sources, however, state that the holder of this record is Wales' Billy Meredith, who scored against England in 1919, at the age of 45, but this match was a Victory International, which is not recognized as a full international.

== Football career statistics ==
National team	Year	Apps	Goals
United States Virgin Islands
United States Virgin Islands	2004	1	0
United States Virgin Islands	2005	0	0
United States Virgin Islands	2006	2	0
United States Virgin Islands	2007	0	0
United States Virgin Islands	2008	0	0
United States Virgin Islands	2009	0	0
United States Virgin Islands	2010	0	0
United States Virgin Islands	2011	5	1
Total		8	1

Scores and results list the U.S. Virgin Islands' goal tally first.

No	Date	Venue	Cap	Opponent	Score	Result	Competition
1.	15 November 2011	Ergilio Hato Stadium, Willemstad, Curaçao	8	Curaçao	1–2	1–6	2014 FIFA World Cup qualification
