= Lennox Samuel =

British Virgin Islands cricketer (born 1979)

Personal information
- Full name: Lennox Davidson Samuel
- Born: 15 August 1979 (age 47)
- Batting: Right-handed
- Bowling: Right-arm off break

Domestic team information
- Years: Team
- 2006–2007/08: British Virgin Islands

Career statistics
Competition	Twenty20
Matches	2
Runs scored	22
Batting average	11.00
100s/50s	–/–
Top score	17
Balls bowled	42
Wickets	1
Bowling average	45.00
5 wickets in innings	–
10 wickets in match	–
Best bowling	1/27
Catches/stumpings	1/–
- Source: Cricinfo, 15 January 2013

Lennox Davidson Samuel (born 15 August 1979) is a British Virgin Islands cricketer. Samuel is a right-handed batsman who bowls right-arm off break.

In 2006, the British Virgin Islands were invited to take part in the 2006 Stanford 20/20, whose matches held official Twenty20 status. Samuel made a single appearance in the tournament against Saint Lucia in a preliminary round defeat, with him being dismissed opening the batting for 5 runs by Darren Sammy. He also bowled three wicketless overs in the match. He later played for the team in its second appearance in the Stanford 20/20 in 2008, making a single appearance in a preliminary round defeat against Dominica, taking the wicket of Vincent Casimir to finish with figures of 1/27 from four overs, while with the bat he was dismissed for 17 runs by Liam Sebastien.
