= Lindon James =

West Indian cricketer (born 1984)

Personal information
- Full name: Lindon Omrick Dinsley James
- Born: 30 December 1984 (age 41); Charlotte Parish, Saint Vincent
- Batting: Right-handed
- Role: Wicket-keeper

Domestic team information
- Years: Team
- 2004–2014: Windward Islands
- Source: CricketArchive, 2 January 2016

Lindon Omrick Dinsley James (born 30 December 1984) is a Vincentian cricketer who has played for the Windward Islands in West Indian domestic cricket. He plays as a wicket-keeper and bats right-handed.

James made his first-class debut in January 2004, playing for the Windwards against Jamaica in the 2003–04 Carib Beer Cup. He scored his maiden first-class half-century during the 2006–07 season, making 55 against the Leeward Islands. In 2006 and 2008, James played for Saint Vincent and the Grenadines in the Stanford 20/20. Against Sint Maarten in the opening match of the 2008 tournament, he scored 73 not out from 37 balls, including four sixes. James was subsequently selected as the back-up wicket-keeper to Andre Fletcher in the Stanford Superstars team for the 2008 Stanford Super Series. He played in only a single match, an exhibition game against Trinidad and Tobago, but as a member of the squad shared in the prize money of US$12 million that was on offer to the winners. James later played several seasons in the Caribbean Twenty20, but has been unable to secure a contract with a Caribbean Premier League (CPL) franchise. His most recent games for the Windwards came in the 2014–15 Regional Four Day Competition.
