= Clifford Fanis =

West Indian cricketer (born 1979)

Personal information
- Full name: Clifford Fanis
- Born: 4 July 1979 (age 47)
- Batting: Unknown
- Bowling: Unknown

Domestic team information
- Years: Team
- 2007/08: United States Virgin Islands

Career statistics
Competition	Twenty20
Matches	1
Runs scored	10
Batting average	10.00
100s/50s	–/–
Top score	10
Catches/stumpings	–/–
- Source: Cricinfo, 6 January 2013

Clifford Fanis (born 4 July 1979) is a former West Indian cricketer. Fanis' batting and bowling styles are unknown.

In February 2008, the United States Virgin Islands were invited to take part in the 2008 Stanford 20/20, whose matches held official Twenty20 status. Fanis made a single appearance for the United States Virgin Islands in their first-round match against Antigua and Barbuda, with their opponents winning the match by 24 runs. He made 10 runs in the match, before being run out by the combination of Juari Edwards and Curtis Roberts.
