= Alston Bobb =

Vincentian cricketer (born 1984)

Personal information
- Full name: Alston Brenton Winston Bobb
- Born: 17 January 1984 (age 42); Saint Vincent
- Batting: Left-handed
- Bowling: Left-arm orthodox

Domestic team information
- Years: Team
- 2009–2015: Windward Islands
- Source: CricketArchive, 2 January 2016

Alston Brenton Winston Bobb (born 17 January 1984) is a Vincentian cricketer who has played for the Windward Islands in West Indian domestic cricket. He is a slow left-arm orthodox bowler.

Bobb made his List A debut in August 2002, when he played a single match for the Saint Vincent and the Grenadines national team in the 2002–03 Red Stripe Bowl (competing separately to the rest of the Windward Islands). He also represented his home country in the 2008 edition of the Stanford 20/20, playing against Sint Maarten and Trinidad and Tobago. Bobb made his first-class debut for the Windward Islands in the 2008–09 Regional Four Day Competition. After that season, he did not again play for the team until the 2012–13 Regional Super50 (a limited-overs competition). Bobb took his maiden first-class five-wicket haul for the Windwards during the 2014–15 Regional Four Day Competition, finishing with 6/45 and 5/48 against Jamaica.
