= Carib Lumber Ball Park =

Cricket ground in Sint Maarten

- Interactive map of Carib Lumber Ball Park

Ground information
- Location: Philipsburg, Sint Maarten
- Country: West Indies
- Coordinates: 18°02′11″N 63°03′44″W
- Establishment: c. 2003

Team information
| Leeward Islands | (2004–2007) |
| Sint Maarten | (2003–present) |
- As of 15 May 2015; Source: Cricinfo

Carib Lumber Ball Park (also known as Charles Vlaun Cricket Field) is a cricket ground located in Philipsburg, Sint Maarten. It is the principal cricket ground in Sint Maarten and has hosted both first-class and List A cricket in West Indian domestic cricket.

== History ==
The ground was completed prior to the year 2003, with the first match held at the ground seeing Sint Maarten play a minor match against Anguilla. The ground held its inaugural first-class fixture in February 2004 when the Leeward Islands played the Windward Islands in the 2003–04 Carib Beer Cup. Five further first-class matches have been played at the ground, the last coming in the 2008–09 Regional Four Day Competition between the Leeward Islands and Barbados. Nine first-class centuries have been scored here, with Ryan Hinds' 240 the highest score. One List A match was played at the ground in the 2006–07 KFC Cup between the Leeward Islands and the Windward Islands, in a match which saw the Windward's Dennis George take a five wicket haul. This remains the only List A match to be played at the ground.

In April 2014, the scoreboard at the ground was seriously damaged by fire, leading to its demolition. It was speculated that the fire was a deliberate act of arson.

== Records ==
=== First-class ===
- Highest team total: 547/8 by Guyana v Leeward Islands, 2005/06
- Lowest team total: 202 all out by Leeward Islands v Windward Islands, 2006/07
- Highest individual innings: 240 by Ryan Hinds for Barbados v Leeward Islands, 2008/09
- Best bowling in an innings: 5/31 by Pedro Collins, as above

=== List A ===
- Highest team total: 206/4 (42.4 overs) by Windward Islands v Leeward Islands, 2006/07
- Lowest team total: 203 all out (48.3 overs) by Leeward Islands v Windward Islands, as above
- Highest individual innings: 85 by Andre Fletcher for Windward Islands v Leeward Islands, as above
- Best bowling in an innings: 5/39 by Dennis George, as above

== See also ==
- List of cricket grounds in the West Indies
