= Cricket in the West Indies =

Cricket in West Indies
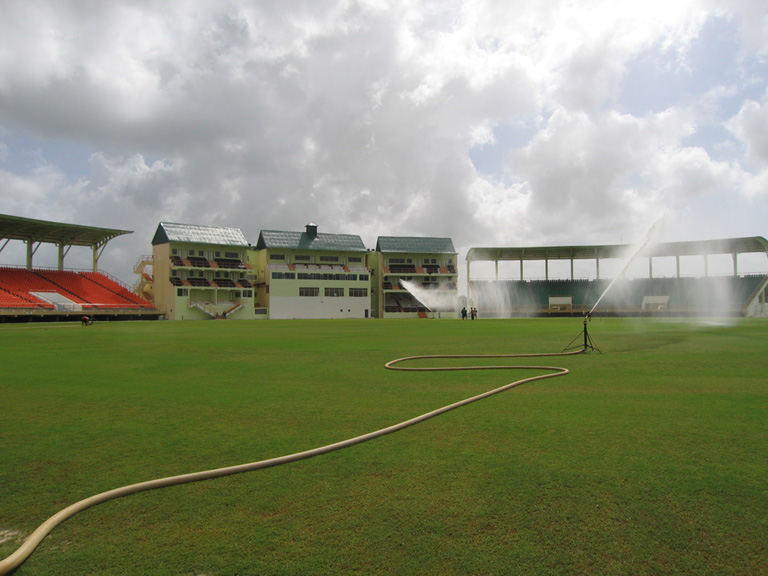
- Providence Stadium in Georgetown, Guyana, one of the premier cricket grounds in the West Indies.
- Country: West Indies
- Governing body: Cricket West Indies
- National teams: West Indies Men; West Indies Women; West Indies U-19 Men; West Indies U-19 Women; West Indies A Men
- Clubs: 6 (CPL); 3 (WCPL)

National competitions
- List: First Class Cricket; West Indies Championship; List A Cricket; Super50 Cup; Women's Super50 Cup; T20 Cricket; Women's Twenty20 Blaze

Club competitions
- List: Caribbean Premier League; Women's Caribbean Premier League

International competitions
- List: Men’s team; ICC World Test Championship: 8th (2019-2021, 2021-2023); Cricket World Cup: Champions (1975, 1979); ICC Men's T20 World Cup: Champions (2012, 2016); ICC Champions Trophy: Champions (2004); Men’s U-19 team; Under-19 Cricket World Cup: Champions (2016); Women's team; Women's Cricket World Cup: Runners-up (2013); ICC Women's World Twenty20: Champions (2016); Women's U-19 team; Under-19 Women's T20 World Cup: Super 6 (2023)

In the sport of cricket, the West Indies is a sporting confederation of fifteen mainly English-speaking Caribbean countries and territories, many of which historically formed the British West Indies. It consists of Anguilla, Antigua and Barbuda, Barbados, the British Virgin Islands, Dominica, Grenada, Guyana, Jamaica, Montserrat, St. Kitts and Nevis, St. Lucia, St. Maarten, St. Vincent & the Grenadines, Trinidad and Tobago and the United States Virgin Islands. The governing body for the confederation is Cricket West Indies (CWI), which is a full member of the International Cricket Council (ICC); beneath the CWI are six territorial governing bodies covering different nations and regions of the confederation. The CWI organises the West Indies cricket team, which represents the confederation in international cricket, as well as administering domestic cricket competitions across the West Indies.

The West Indies cricket team, nicknamed "The Windies", are one of the twelve Test cricket teams, having gained Test status in 1928. They were considered amongst the strongest Test teams from the 1960s, ushering a golden age in which they were undisputed champions for the latter part of the 1970s to the mid 1990s. In One Day International cricket, they have won the World Cup twice and the ICC Trophy once. They have also won the World Twenty20 twice.

Domestic competitions organised across the whole of the West Indies include the Regional Four Day Competition (First-class), the Regional Super50 (List A) and the Caribbean Premier League (Twenty20).

Cricket is also played in other Caribbean nations and territories such as the Cayman Islands, the Bahamas, the Turks and Caicos Islands, Belize, Suriname, and Cuba who are associate members of the ICC. As such, these teams do not form part of the West Indies for cricketing purposes, and field their own separate national teams.

Originally introduced to the West Indies by British soldiers, cricket's popularity spread to the black population and it is traditionally considered one of the most popular team sport in the West Indies and a major part of West Indian culture, although others sports such as association football and basketball have challenged its popularity since the 1990s. Major international cricket competitions hosted by the West Indies include the 2007 World Cup, the 2010 World Twenty20, and the 2024 T20 World Cup.

== History ==
=== Origin ===
Cricket originally spread to the West Indies via the British military. Military officials established cricket clubs, including the St. Annes Garrison Club, and integrated cricket pitches into garrisons in the Caribbean. The first known reference to cricket in the West Indies is believed to be from June 1806, in the Barbados Mercury and Bridgetown Gazette. Two years later, a cricket match was held between the officers of the Royal West Indies Rangers and the officers of the Third West India Regiment. It is believed that the military was a major influencing force behind the drive to begin playing cricket porting this, there were known to be cricket pitches located in many garrisons all around the Caribbean.

=== Expansion of cricket ===
During the period of colonial rule, cricket began to be played by the black population of the British West Indies. This adoption was a consequence of constant positive reinforcement from their masters for participating in activities that were familiar such as cricket, and abstaining from those that were perceived as taboo. Eventually, slaves were granted permission to play with military officers (who at one point only played cricket amongst themselves) in restricted roles. Foremost, they were allowed to prepare the wicket before matches, although some were permitted to bowl or retrieve batted balls.

As official cricket clubs began to form, some black players were given the opportunity to play for white-majority clubs. However, many cricket clubs remained exclusively white, which led black players to establish their own clubs that would only allow other blacks to join. Clubs such as the Barbados Cricket Committee (BCC), which was established in the late nineteenth century, adhered to the policy of an all-white team, while Jamaica's Melbourne Cricket Club was composed of only professional black cricketeers. The first inter-island competition took place in 1865 between Demerara and Barbados, at the Garrison Savannah. However, these matches were at first "organized and played almost exclusively by whites." Over time, integrated matches became increasingly more common, as integrated cricket teams competed at first in an attempt to prove their dominance over the other teams of other colonies. Some segregation still existed, for instance the fact that black players were often excluded "from clubhouse refreshment breaks during and after the game". Gradually, blacks began to be employed on professional teams, marking the start of full racial integration in the sport.

The English were eager to promote cricket throughout the British Empire, and on 31 May 1926 the West Indian Cricket Board, along with their New Zealand and Indian counterparts, was elected to the Imperial Cricket Conference (ICC), which previously consisted of the English and representatives of Australia and South Africa.^{[18]} Election to full membership of the ICC meant the West Indies could play official Test matches,^{[19]} which is the designation given to the most important international games, and the Windies became the fourth team actually to play a recognised Test match on 23 June 1928 when they took on England at Lord's in London.^{[2]}

=== Societal impact ===
Cricket has traditionally been the most popular sport in the West Indies, both before and after independence. The inclusion of black players into West Indian cricket teams marked a moment of racial integration in West Indian society. Talented black players helped to overturn existing attitudes of white superiority. Cricket helped to serve a dual purpose for the West Indies- before slavery was abolished in 1833, cricket was considered as a constructive pastime for blacks. In that same time period, it was also considered a way for the whites to exhibit their loyalty to the Crown.

Two noteworthy West Indian cricketers are George Headley, who captained the West Indies in the first test against the touring MCC team in 1947-48, and Barbadian Sir Frank Worrell, who was captain of the West Indies team against Australia in 1960-61. In 2009, Both Headley and Worrell were inducted into the ICC Cricket Hall of Fame. The early 1970s to mid-1990s showed a major increase in the dominance of the West Indian cricket team. The general historical consensus is that this is due to an increase in fast bowling, backed up by some of the best batsmen in the world. In 1976, fast bowler Michael Holding took 14/149 in The Oval Test against England, setting a record which still stands for best bowling figures in a Test by a West Indies bowler.

== Administration ==
The Cricket West Indies (CWI) is the governing body for professional and amateur cricket in the West Indies. It was originally formed in the early 1920s as the West Indies Cricket Board of Control (and is still sometimes referred by that name), but changed its name in 1996. The Board has its headquarters in St. John's, Antigua and Barbuda.

The CWI has been a full member of the International Cricket Council (ICC) since 1926 and is also a member of Americas Cricket Association. It operates the West Indies cricket team and West Indies A cricket team, organising Test tours and one-day internationals with other teams.

== International teams ==
West Indies teams
- West Indies (Men's): West Indies (Women's)
- West Indies U-19 (Men's): West Indies U-19 (Women's)

West Indies A Men

Combined West Indies cricket teams are technically international (rather than national) in nature, as they represent several, separate independent countries at the highest international level of competition; none of these countries usually contributes a separate national teams to international competitions at the hobhest level. As such, the peak governing body for cricket in these countries is Cricket West Indies (CWI). Since 1926, CWI has been affiliated to the International Cricket Council (ICC), the international governing body for world cricket (rather than the various cricket associations of the nations affiliated to CWI.

=== Performance ===
The following list includes the performance of all of the West Indies' teams at major competitions.

==== Men's senior team ====
The West Indies men's team has had numerous successes, has a long history of international matches and has long been considered the strongest team in the Americas. The team's highest achievements include winning the Cricket World Cup and test series.

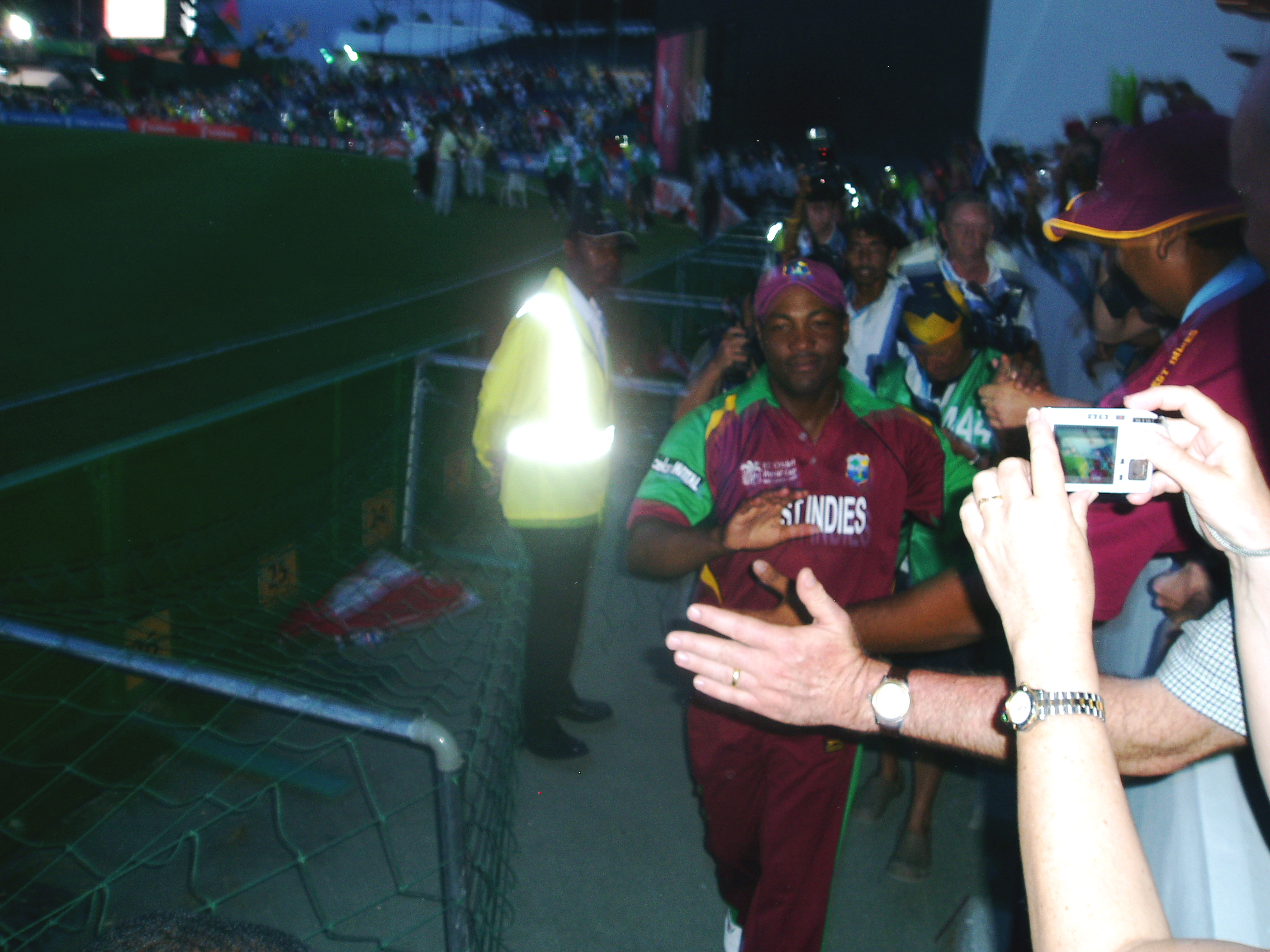
Lara during his lap of honour in his final international match, 2007 Cricket World Cup

Tournament	Appearance in finals	Last appearance	Best performance
ICC Men's Cricket World Cup	3 out of 13	2023	Champions (1975, 1979)
ICC Men's T20 World Cup	2 out of 9	2024	Champions (2012, 2016)
ICC Champions Trophy	3 out of 8	2017	Champions (2004)
ICC World Test Championship	0 out of 3	2023–25	8th (2019-2021, 2021-2023)

==== Women's senior team ====
Tournament	Appearance in finals	Last appearance	Best performance
ICC Women's Cricket World Cup	1 out of 12	2022	Runners-up (2013)
ICC Women's T20 World Cup	1 out of 9	2024	Champions (2016)

==== Men's U-19 team ====
Tournament	Appearance in finals	Last appearance	Best performance
ICC Under-19 Cricket World Cup	2 out of 15	2024	Champions (2016)

==== Women's U-19 team ====
Tournament	Appearance in finals	Last appearance	Best performance
Under-19 Women's T20 World Cup	0 out of 1	2023	Super 6 (2023)

== Organisation of cricket in modern West Indies ==
=== International cricket ===
Cricket in West Indies is managed by the Cricket West Indies (CWI)

==== Men's Team ====
The West Indies Cricket Team represents West Indies in international cricket matches.

West Indies have been participating in international cricket since 1926 and competed in international tournament since the first ever the 1975 Cricket World Cup. The West Indies cricket team has also provided some of the greatest players to the world, the biggest example of which is Viv Richards. West Indies cricket has a rich history. The West Indies men's team is currently ranked No. 8 in Tests, No. 10 in ODIs and at 3rd position in T20Is. India won two World Championship cups in 1975 and 1979 consequently under the captaincy of Sir Clive Lloyd.

- Test International- West Indies made their debut as a Test playing nation in 1928 against England. They have played 582 test match till now.
- One Day International-West Indies played their first ODI International in 1973 against England. They were able to participate in first edition of Cricket World Cup and have almost clinch the title consequently in 1975 Cricket World Cup and 1979 Cricket World Cup.
- T20 International- West Indies played their first T20 International in 2006 against New Zealand. West Indies Men's have made great impact in T20 international from their early day of this format. They have clinch the title two times in 2012 World Twenty20 and 2016 World Twenty20.

==== Women's National Team ====
The West Indies women's cricket team represents West Indies in international women's cricket matches.

West Indies have been participating in international cricket since 1976 and competed in international tournament since the fifth 1993 Women's Cricket World Cup. They are the most successful women's cricket team in Americas. The West Indies Women's team is also currently ranked No. 6 in ODIs and at 6th position in T20Is.

- Test International- West Indies made their debut as a Test playing nation in 1976 against Australia. In past time, West Indies women's rarely play test and won it.
- One Day International-West Indies played their first ODI International in 1979 against England. They were not able to participate in first five edition of Women's Cricket World Cup. But in late 19s they have reached to ODI world cup consequently and in latest 2022 Women's Cricket World Cup they have reached semis.
- T20 International- West Indies played their first T20 International in 2008 against Ireland. West Indies Women's have made great impact in T20 international from their early day of this format. They have clinch the title of ICC Women's T20 World Cup in 2016.

=== Domestic Cricket ===
==== Men's Domestic Cricket ====
===== First class competitions =====
- West Indies Championship

===== Limited overs competitions =====
- Super50 Cup

===== Twenty20 competitions =====
- Caribbean Premier League

==== Women's Domestic Cricket ====
===== Limited overs competitions =====
- Women's Super50 Cup

===== Twenty20 competitions =====
- Women's Caribbean Premier League
- Women's Twenty20 Blaze

==== Youth competitions ====
- TCL Under-19 West Indies Challenge
- TCL Under-19 West Indies Challenge Limited Overs Series
- CLICO West Indies Under-15 competition

== Stadiums ==
=== Active Stadiums ===
Name	City	Country (constituent island)	Capacity	First used	Tests	ODIs	T20Is	Notes
Kensington Oval	Bridgetown	Barbados	28,000	1930	53	35	17	
Queen's Park Oval	Port of Spain	Trinidad and Tobago	20,000	1930	61	68	6	
Bourda	Georgetown	Guyana	25,000	1930	30	11	0	
Sabina Park	Kingston	Jamaica	15,600	1930	50	37	3	
Antigua Recreation Ground	St. John's	Antigua and Barbuda	12,000	1981	22	11	0	
Arnos Vale Stadium	Kingstown	Saint Vincent and the Grenadines	18,000	1997	3	23	2	
National Cricket Stadium	St. George's	Grenada	20,000	2002	3	21	0	
Daren Sammy Cricket Ground	Gros Islet	Saint Lucia	15,000	2003	6	29	12	
Warner Park	Basseterre	Saint Kitts and Nevis	8,000	2006	3	17	5	
Providence Stadium	Providence	Guyana	15,000	2008	2	19	6	
Sir Vivian Richards Stadium	North Sound	Antigua and Barbuda	10,000	2009	6	17	4	
Windsor Park	Roseau	Dominica	12,000	2011	6	4	2	

== International competitions hosted ==
Competition	Edition	Winner	Final	Runners-up	West Indies's position	Venues	Final venue	Stadium
Men's senior competitions
ICC Men's Cricket World Cup	2007 Cricket World Cup	Australia	281/4 (38 overs) – 215/8 (36 overs)	Sri Lanka	Super 8	8 (in 8 countries)	Kensington Oval	
ICC Men's T20 World Cup	2010 World Twenty20	England	147/6 (20 overs) – 148/3 (17 overs)	Australia	Super 8	3 ( in 3 countries)	Kensington Oval	
ICC Men's T20 World Cup	2024 Men's T20 World Cup	India	176/7 (20 overs) – 169/8 (20 overs)	South Africa	Super 8	9 (in 7 countries)	Kensington Oval	
Under-19 Men's Cricket World Cup	2022 Under-19 Men's Cricket World Cup	India	189 (44.5 overs) – 195/6 (47.4 overs)	England	First round	8 (in 5 countries)	Sir Vivian Richards Stadium	
Women's senior competitions
Women's T20 World Cup	2010 Women's World Twenty20	Australia	106/8 (20 overs) – 103/6 (20 overs)	New Zealand	Semi-final	3 (in 3 countries)	Kensington Oval	

== Performance in international competitions ==
A red box around the year indicates tournaments played within West Indies

Key
Champions
Runners-up
Semi-finals

=== Men's team ===
==== ICC World Test Championship ====
ICC World Test Championship record
Year	League stage										Final Host	Final	Final Position
Year	Pos	Matches					Ded	PC	Pts	PCT	Final Host	Final	Final Position
Year	Pos	P	W	L	D	T	Ded	PC	Pts	PCT	Final Host	Final	Final Position
2019–21	8/9	13	3	8	2	0	6	720	194	26.9	Rose Bowl, England	DNQ	8th
2021–23	8/9	13	4	7	2	0	2	156	54	34.1	The Oval, England	DNQ	8th
2023–25		9	1	6	0	2	0	108	20	18.52	Lord's, England		

==== ICC Cricket World Cup ====
World Cup record
Hosts, Year	Round	Position	GP	W	L	T	NR
(England) 1975	Champions	1/8	5	5	0	0	0
(England) 1979	Champions	1/8	5	4	0	0	1
(England) (Wales) 1983	Runners-up	2/8	8	6	2	0	0
(India) (Pakistan) 1987	Round 1	5/8	6	3	3	0	0
(Australia) (New Zealand) 1992	Round 1	6/9	8	4	4	0	0
(India) (Pakistan) (Sri Lanka) 1996	Semi-finals	4/12	7	3	4	0	0
(England) (Ireland) (Scotland) (Netherlands) (Wales) 1999	Round 1	7/12	5	3	2	0	0
(South Africa) (Zimbabwe) (Kenya) 2003	Round 1	7/14	6	3	2	0	1
(Cricket West Indies) 2007	Super 8	6/16	10	5	5	0	0
(India) (Sri Lanka) (Bangladesh) 2011	Quarter-finals	8/14	7	3	4	0	0
(Australia) (New Zealand) 2015	Quarter-finals	8/14	7	3	4	0	0
(England) (Wales) 2019	Group stage	9/10	9	2	6	0	1
(India) 2023	Did not qualify						
Total	12/13	2 Titles	80	43	35	0	2

==== ICC T20 World Cup ====
T20 World Cup record
Hosts, Year	Round	Position	GP	W	L	T	NR
(South Africa) 2007	Group stage	11/12	2	0	2	0	0
(England) 2009	Semi-finals	4/12	6	3	3	0	0
(Cricket West Indies) 2010	Super 8	6/12	5	3	2	0	0
(Sri Lanka) 2012	Champions	1/12	7	3	2	1	1
(Bangladesh) 2014	Semi-finals	3/16	5	3	2	0	0
(India) 2016	Champions	1/16	6	5	1	0	0
(United Arab Emirates) (Oman) 2021	Super 12	9/16	5	1	4	0	0
(Australia) 2022	Group Stage	15/16	3	1	2	0	0
(Cricket West Indies) (United States) 2024	Super 8	5/20	7	5	2	0	0
Total	9/9	2 titles	46	24	20	1	1

==== ICC Champions Trophy ====
Champions Trophy record
Hosts, Year	Round	Position	GP	W	L	T	NR
(Bangladesh) 1998	Runners-up	2/9	3	2	1	0	0
(Kenya) 2000	Round 1	11/11	1	0	1	0	0
(Sri Lanka) 2002	Round 1	7/12	2	1	1	0	0
(England) 2004	Champions	1/12	4	4	0	0	0
(India) 2006	Runners-up	2/10	8	5	3	0	0
(South Africa) 2009	Round 1	8/8	3	0	3	0	0
(England) (Wales) 2013	Round 1	6/8	3	1	1	1	0
(England) (Wales) 2017	Did not qualify						
(Pakistan) (United Arab Emirates) 2025	Did not qualify						
Total	7/9	1 title	24	13	10	1	0

==== ICC World Cup Qualifier ====
World Cup Qualifier record
Year	Round	Position	GP	W	L	T	AB
England 2018	Runners-up	2/10	10	8	2	0	0
Zimbabwe 2023	Super 6	5/10	9	3	6	0	0
Total	-	0 title	19	11	8	0	0

=== Women's team ===
==== ICC Women's Cricket World Cup ====
World Cup record
Year	Round	Position	Played	Won	Lost	Tie	NR
(England) 1973	Did not participate						
(India) 1978	Did not participate						
(New Zealand) 1982	Did not participate						
(Australia) 1988	Did not participate						
(England) 1993	Group Stage	6/8	7	2	5	0	0
(India) 1997	Group Stage	10/11	4	0	3	0	1
(New Zealand) 2000	Did not participate						
(South Africa) 2005	Group Stage	5/8	7	2	3	0	2
(Australia) 2009	Super 6s	6/8	8	1	7	0	0
(India) 2013	Runners-up	2/8	9	5	4	0	0
(England) 2017	Group Stage	6/8	7	2	5	0	0
(New Zealand) 2022	Semi-final	4/8	8	3	4	0	1
(India) 2025							
Total	0 Title	-	50	15	31	0	4

==== ICC Women's T20 World Cup ====
T20 World Cup record
Year	Round	Position	Played	Won	Lost	Tie	NR
(England) 2009	Group Stage	5/8	3	1	2	0	0
(Cricket West Indies) 2010	Semi-final	4/8	4	2	2	0	0
(Sri Lanka) 2012	Semi-final	3/8	4	2	2	0	0
(Bangladesh) 2014	Semi-final	4/10	5	3	2	0	0
(India) 2016	Champions	1/10	6	5	1	0	0
(United Arab Emirates) 2018	Semi-final	3/10	5	4	1	0	0
(Australia) 2020	Group Stage	6/10	4	1	2	0	1
(South Africa) 2023	Group Stage	6/10	4	2	2	0	0
(United Arab Emirates) 2024	Semi-final	4/10	5	4	1	0	0
(England) 2026							
Total	1 Title	-	40	24	15	0	1

=== Men's U-19 team ===
==== U-19 World Cup ====
West Indies U19 World Cup record
Year	Result	Pos	№	Pld	W	L	T	NR
(Australia) 1988	Semi-finals	3rd	8	8	5	3	0	0
(South Africa) 1998	First round	10th	16	7	5	2	0	0
(Sri Lanka) 2000	Second round	5th	16	6	4	2	0	0
(New Zealand) 2002	Semi-finals	4th	16	7	4	3	0	0
(Bangladesh) 2004	Runner-up	2nd	16	8	5	3	0	0
(Sri Lanka) 2006	Second round	8th	16	5	2	3	0	0
(Malaysia) 2008	First round	9th	16	6	4	2	0	0
(New Zealand) 2010	Semi-finals	3rd	16	6	4	2	0	0
(Australia) 2012	Quarter-finals	6th	16	6	4	2	0	0
(United Arab Emirates) 2014	Quarter-finals	6th	16	6	3	3	0	0
(Bangladesh) 2016	Champion	1st	16	6	5	1	0	0
(New Zealand) 2018	First round	10th	16	6	3	3	0	0
(South Africa) 2020	Quarter-finals	5th	16	6	4	1	0	1
(Cricket West Indies) 2022	First round	11th	16	6	3	3	0	0
(South Africa) 2024	Second round	5th	16	5	3	1	0	1
Total				82	55	27	0	2

=== Women's U-19 team ===
==== Under-19 Women's World Cup ====
West Indies's U19 Twenty20 World Cup Record
Year	Result	Pos	№	Pld	W	L	T	NR
(South Africa) 2023	Super 6	–	16	5	2	3	0	0
(Malaysia) (Thailand) 2025	To be determined							
(Bangladesh) (Nepal) 2027	To be determined							
Total				5	3	2	0	0

== Bibliography ==
- Bird, Lester B. (March 3, 2012), "The farce we call West Indies cricket", Caribbean News Now
- Malcolm, Dominic (2012), Globalizing Cricket: Codification, Colonization and Contemporary Identities, London: Bloomsbury, ISBN 9781849665278
