= Kenroy Martin =

West Indian cricketer

Personal information
- Full name: Kenroy Denroy Martin
- Born: 8 January 1979 (age 47); Saint Vincent
- Batting: Left-handed
- Bowling: Right-arm medium
- Role: All-rounder

Domestic team information
- Years: Team
- 1997–2004: Windward Islands
- 2001: Southern Windward Islands
- 2002: West Indies B
- Source: CricketArchive, 29 March 2016

Kenroy Denroy Martin (born 8 January 1979) is a former Vincentian cricketer who represented the Windward Islands and several other teams in West Indian domestic cricket. He played as an all-rounder, batting left-handed and bowling right-arm medium pace.

Martin his first-class debut for the Windwards in April 1997, in a Red Stripe Cup game against Jamaica. In his next match, against the Leeward Islands, he made 65 runs, which was to be his highest first-class score. The following year, Martin represented the West Indies under-19s at the 1998 Under-19 World Cup in South Africa. He played in four of his team's matches, but had little impact. Later in 1998, Martin made his List A debut, appearing for the Windwards in the 1997–98 Red Stripe Bowl.

In the 2001–02 Red Stripe Bowl, Martin represented the Southern Windward Islands team that appeared on a once-off basis. In that season's Busta Cup (the renamed Red Stripe Cup), he played for West Indies B, a development team drawn from across the Caribbean. Against Bangladesh A (competing as a guest team), he scored 61 runs, his second first-class half-century. For the 2002–03 Red Stripe Bowl, the Saint Vincent and the Grenadines national team competed separately, with Martin featuring in all four of their matches. He took ten wickets, including 4/52 against the University of the West Indies, which made him his team's leading wicket-taker (and equal seventh overall).

Playing against India A in the 2002–03 Busta Cup, Martin took figures of 3/5 from six overs, his best at first-class level. The following season was his last for the Windwards, with his final match coming against Jamaica in February 2004. However, in 2006 and 2008, Martin represented the Saint Vincent national team in the Stanford 20/20 tournament, where matches held official Twenty20 status. In the opening match of the 2006 tournament, against the United States Virgin Islands, he took 3/6 from 2.1 overs, and also 21 not out, for which he was named man of the match. He was wicketless in the next match against Grenada, however, and in his sole appearance in 2008, against Sint Maarten, conceded 52 runs from four overs without taking a wicket.
