= Kevin Joseph (cricketer) =

British Virgin Islands cricketer (born 1978)

Personal information
- Full name: Kevin Claudius Joseph
- Born: 20 December 1978 (age 47); Trinidad and Tobago
- Batting: Left-handed

Domestic team information
- Years: Team
- 2006–2007/08: British Virgin Islands

Career statistics
Competition	Twenty20
Matches	2
Runs scored	24
Batting average	12.00
100s/50s	–/–
Top score	19
Balls bowled	–
Wickets	–
Bowling average	–
5 wickets in innings	–
10 wickets in match	–
Best bowling	–
Catches/stumpings	–/–
- Source: Cricinfo, 14 January 2013

Kevin Claudius Joseph (born 20 December 1978) is a Trinidadian-born former British Virgin Islands cricketer. Joseph was a left-handed batsman.

In 2006, the British Virgin Islands were invited to take part in the 2006 Stanford 20/20, whose matches held official Twenty20 status. Joseph made a single appearance in the tournament against Saint Lucia in a preliminary round defeat, with him being run out for 19 runs opening the batting by the combination of Darren Sammy and Garey Mathurin. He later played for the team in its second appearance in the Stanford 20/20 in 2008, making a single appearance in a preliminary round defeat against Dominica, where he again opened the batting and was dismissed for 5 runs by Raymond Casimir.
