= Kevin Joseph =

Kevin Joseph may refer to:

- Kevin Joseph (baseball) (born 1976), American former baseball pitcher
- Kevin Joseph (cricketer) (born 1978), Trinidadian-born former British Virgin Islands cricketer
