= Sherwin Peters =

West Indian cricketer

Personal information
- Full name: Sherwin Pele Peters
- Born: 2 May 1990 (age 36); Trinidad
- Batting: Right-handed
- Bowling: Right-arm medium-fast

Domestic team information
- Years: Team
- 2011–present: Leeward Islands

Career statistics
Competition	FC	LA	T20
Matches	18	4	1
Runs scored	567	64	9
Batting average	16.20	16.00	9.00
100s/50s	1/1	0/0	0/0
Top score	136	32	9
Balls bowled	995	60	-
Wickets	18	0	-
Bowling average	26.50	-	-
5 wickets in innings	0	0	0
10 wickets in match	0	0	0
Best bowling	3/19	-/-	-/-
Catches/stumpings	9/0	1/0	0/0
- Source: CricketArchive, 25 April 2017

Sherwin Pele Peters (born 2 May 1990) is a professional cricketer from Sint Maarten who plays for the Leeward Islands in West Indian domestic cricket. He is a right-handed all-rounder who often opens the batting.

Peters was born in Trinidad, but raised in Sint Maarten. In 2008, aged 17, he played for the Sint Maarten national team in the Stanford 20/20. The team was knocked out by Saint Vincent and the Grenadines in the first round, in a match which held full Twenty20 status. A former Leewards under-19s player, Peters' senior debut for the Leeward Islands came during the 2010–11 Regional Four Day Competition, against Trinidad and Tobago. In his second match, against Barbados, he scored a maiden first-class half-century, 57 runs from 154 balls. Against Jamaica in the 2014–15 Regional Four Day Competition, Peters hit 136 runs from 213 balls, making his first hundred at that level.
