= West Indian cricket team in South Africa in 2014–15 =

West Indies cricket team in South Africa in 2014–15
	South Africa	West Indies
- Dates: 10 December 2014 – 28 January 2015
Captains	Hashim Amla (Tests); AB de Villiers (ODIs); Faf du Plessis (1st & 2nd T20Is) & Justin Ontong (3rd T20I)	Denesh Ramdin (Tests); Jason Holder (ODIs); Darren Sammy (T20Is)

Test series
- Result: South Africa won the 3-match series 2–0
Most runs	Hashim Amla (342)	Marlon Samuels (268)
Most wickets	Morne Morkel, Dale Steyn (13)	Sulieman Benn (6)
- Player of the series: Hashim Amla (SA)

One Day International series
- Results: South Africa won the 5-match series 4–1
Most runs	Hashim Amla (413)	Marlon Samuels (196)
Most wickets	Imran Tahir, Vernon Philander (8)	Jason Holder (8)
- Player of the series: Hashim Amla (SA)

Twenty20 International series
- Results: West Indies won the 3-match series 2–1
Most runs	Faf du Plessis (157)	Chris Gayle (167)
Most wickets	David Wiese (9)	Jason Holder, Dwayne Bravo & Sheldon Cottrell (3)
- Player of the series: Chris Gayle (WI)

The West Indies cricket team toured South Africa from 10 December 2014 to 28 January 2015. The tour consisted of three Twenty20 Internationals (T20Is), three Test matches and five One Day Internationals (ODIs). With South Africa's 2–0 win in the Test series, they retained the number one position in the Test rankings.

In the second Twenty20 International, the West Indies set a new world record for the highest successful run chase in a T20I match. In the second ODI, AB de Villiers set the record for both the fastest half century (16 balls) and the fastest century (31 balls) in ODI history. South Africa's score of 439/2 in that game is their highest in the 50-over format. South Africa won the ODI series 4–1.

== Squads ==
Tests		T20Is		ODIs	
West Indies	South Africa	West Indies	South Africa	West Indies	South Africa
Denesh Ramdin (C) (WK); Sulieman Benn; Jermaine Blackwood; Kraigg Brathwaite; Shivnarine Chanderpaul; Sheldon Cottrell; Assad Fudadin; Shannon Gabriel; Jason Holder; Leon Johnson; Kemar Roach; Marlon Samuels; Devon Smith; Jerome Taylor; Chadwick Walton; Darren Bravo (withdrawn); Chris Gayle (withdrawn); Kenroy Peters	Hashim Amla (C); AB de Villiers (VC); Kyle Abbott; Temba Bavuma; Quinton de Kock (WK); Faf du Plessis; Dean Elgar; Morne Morkel; Alviro Petersen; Robin Peterson; Vernon Philander; Kagiso Rabada; Dale Steyn; Stiaan van Zyl	Darren Sammy (C); Sulieman Benn; Carlos Brathwaite; Dwayne Bravo; Sheldon Cottrell; Andre Fletcher; Chris Gayle; Jason Holder; Ashley Nurse; Kieron Pollard; Denesh Ramdin (WK); Andre Russell; Marlon Samuels; Lendl Simmons; Dwayne Smith	Faf du Plessis (C); Kyle Abbott; Farhaan Behardien; Marchant de Lange; JP Duminy; Reeza Hendricks; David Miller; Wayne Parnell; Aaron Phangiso; Kagiso Rabada; Rilee Rossouw; Imran Tahir; Morne van Wyk; David Wiese	Jason Holder (C); Sulieman Benn; Carlos Brathwaite; Jonathan Carter; Sheldon Cottrell; Narsingh Deonarine; Leon Johnson; Chris Gayle; Denesh Ramdin (WK); Andre Russell; Darren Sammy; Marlon Samuels; Lendl Simmons; Dwayne Smith; Jerome Taylor	AB de Villiers (C); Hashim Amla (VC); Kyle Abbott; Farhaan Behardien; JP Duminy; Faf du Plessis; Imran Tahir; David Miller; Morne Morkel; Wayne Parnell; Aaron Phangiso; Vernon Philander; Rilee Rossouw; Dale Steyn; Morne van Wyk (WK)

== Tour Matches ==
=== West Indians v SA Invitational XI ===
10–12 December 2014
Scorecard

SA Invitational XI	v	West Indians
125 (36.1 overs); Aviwe Mgijima 35 (64); Sheldon Cottrell 5/16 (6.1 overs)		508 (115.1 overs); Marlon Samuels 203 (176); Tabraiz Shamsi 3/106 (26.1 overs)
17/0 (6.2 overs); Gihahn Cloete 9* (20); Sheldon Cottrell 0/8 (3 overs)

Match Drawn
Willowmoore Park, Benoni
Umpires: Lubabalo Gcuma (SA) and Allahudien Paleker (SA)

- SA Invitational XI won the toss and elected to bat
- Rain caused no play on Day 3

== Test series ==
=== 1st Test ===
17–21 December
Scorecard

South Africa	v	West Indies
552/5d (140.3 overs); Hashim Amla 208 (371); Kemar Roach 2/52 (15.5 overs)		201 (60.2 overs); Devon Smith 35 (74); Vernon Philander 4/29 (15 overs)
		131 (42.3 overs) f/o Leon Johnson 39 (88); Dale Steyn 6/34 (8.2 overs)

South Africa won by an innings and 220 runs
Centurion Park, Centurion
Umpires: Aleem Dar (Pak) and Billy Bowden (NZ)
Player of the match: Hashim Amla (SA)

- West Indies won the toss and elected to field.
- Match start delayed by 30 minutes due to a wet outfield.
- Tea was taken early on day 2 due to potential rain, with no further play possible.
- Stiaan van Zyl (SA) made his Test debut.

=== 2nd Test ===
26–30 December
Scorecard

South Africa	v	West Indies
417/8d (122 overs); Dean Elgar 121 (239); Kenroy Peters 2/69 (20 overs)		275/9 (79 overs); Kraigg Brathwaite 106* (186); Morne Morkel 4/69 (20 overs)

Match Drawn
St George's Park, Port Elizabeth
Umpires: Billy Bowden (NZ) and Paul Reiffel (Aus)
Player of the match: Kraigg Brathwaite (WI)

- West Indies won the toss and elected to field.
- Only 30 minutes of play was possible on Day 2 and 3 hours of play on Day 3 due to rain. No play was possible on Day 5 also due to rain.
- Temba Bavuma (SA) and Kenroy Peters (WI) made their Test debuts.
- Alviro Petersen announced his retirement from International Cricket after the match

=== 3rd Test ===
2–6 January
Scorecard

West Indies	v	South Africa
329 (99.5 overs); Jermaine Blackwood 56 (113); Dale Steyn 4/78 (25 overs)		421 (122.4 overs); AB de Villiers 148 (194); Jason Holder 2/87 (24 overs)
215 (79.5 overs); Marlon Samuels 74 (150); Simon Harmer 4/82 (24 overs)		124/2 (37.4 overs); Dean Elgar 60* (103); Sulieman Benn 2/17 (24 overs)

South Africa won by 8 wickets
Newlands, Cape Town
Umpires: Aleem Dar (Pak) and Paul Reiffel (Aus)
Player of the match: AB de Villiers (SA)

- West Indies won the toss and elected to bat.
- Play ended early on day 2 due to rain and delayed the start of day 4 until after the tea interval.
- Simon Harmer (SA) made his Test debut.

== T20I series ==
=== 1st T20I ===
9 January
Scorecard

South Africa; 165/4 (20 overs)	v	West Indies; 168/6 (19.2 overs)
Rilee Rossouw 51 (40); Sheldon Cottrell 2/33 (4 overs)		Chris Gayle 77 (31); Imran Tahir 3/28 (4 overs)

West Indies won by 4 wickets
Newlands, Cape Town
Umpires: Johan Cloete (SA) and Shaun George (SA)
Player of the match: Chris Gayle (WI)

- South Africa won the toss and elected to bat.

=== 2nd T20I ===
11 January
Scorecard

South Africa; 231/7 (20 overs)	v	West Indies; 236/6 (19.2 overs)
Faf du Plessis 119 (56); Dwayne Bravo 2/32 (4 overs)		Chris Gayle 90 (41); David Wiese 3/43 (4 overs)

West Indies won by 4 wickets
New Wanderers Stadium, Johannesburg
Umpires: Shaun George (SA) and Adrian Holdstock (SA)
Player of the match: Chris Gayle (WI)

- West Indies won the toss and elected to field.
- This is the highest successful run chase in T20I history.

=== 3rd T20I ===
14 January
Scorecard

South Africa; 195/3 (20 overs)	v	West Indies; 126 (19 overs)
Morné van Wyk 114* (70); Kieron Pollard 1/13 (2 overs)		Lendl Simmons 49 (31); David Wiese 5/23 (4 overs)

South Africa won by 69 runs
Kingsmead, Durban
Umpires: Johan Cloete (SA) and Shaun George (SA)
Player of the match: Morné van Wyk (SA)

- West Indies won the toss and elected to field.
- Morné van Wyk's 114* (70) was the longest innings in a T20I

== ODI series ==
=== 1st ODI ===
16 January
Scorecard

South Africa; 279/8 (48.2 overs)	v	West Indies; 164 (28.2 overs)
AB de Villiers 81 (94); Andre Russell 2/51 (10 overs)		Chris Gayle 41 (24); Imran Tahir 3/30 (6 overs)

South Africa won by 61 runs (DLS method)
Kingsmead, Durban
Umpires: Johan Cloete (SA) and Sundaram Ravi (Ind)
Player of the match: AB de Villiers (SA)

- South Africa won the toss and elected to bat.
- Rain stopped the South African innings with 48.2 overs completed and reduced West Indies' target to 226 off 33 overs.
- Jonathan Carter (WI) made his ODI debut.
- Hashim Amla (SA) became the fastest player to reach 5,000 runs in ODIs.

=== 2nd ODI ===
18 January
Scorecard

South Africa; 439/2 (50 overs)	v	West Indies; 291/7 (50 overs)
Hashim Amla 153* (142); Andre Russell 1/78 (10 overs)		Denesh Ramdin 57 (55); Morne Morkel 2/43 (10 overs)

South Africa won by 148 runs
New Wanderers Stadium, Johannesburg
Umpires: Steve Davis (Aus) and Adrian Holdstock (SA)
Player of the match: AB De Villiers (SA)

- West Indies won the toss and elected to field.
- South Africa scored their highest ODI score.
- AB de Villiers (SA) scored the fastest 50 (16 balls) and the fastest 100 (31 balls) in ODI cricket. He also equaled the record for the most sixes in an ODI innings (16).

=== 3rd ODI ===
21 January
Scorecard

West Indies; 122 (33.4 overs)	v	South Africa; 124/1 (24.4 overs)
Marlon Samuels 26 (38); Imran Tahir 4/28 (7.4 overs)		Hashim Amla 61* (63); Jason Holder 1/14 (5 overs)

South Africa won by 9 wickets
Buffalo Park, East London
Umpires: Johan Cloete (SA) and Sundaram Ravi (Ind)
Player of the match: Vernon Philander (SA)

- West Indies won the toss and elected to bat.
- Dale Steyn (SA) took his 150th ODI wicket.

=== 4th ODI ===
25 January
Scorecard

South Africa; 262/8 (50 overs)	v	West Indies; 266/9 (48.3 overs)
David Miller 130* (133); Jason Holder 4/53 (10 overs)		Marlon Samuels 68 (93); Farhaan Behardien 2/21 (4 overs)

West Indies won by 1 wicket
St George's Park, Port Elizabeth
Umpires: Steve Davis (Aus) and Shaun George (SA)
Player of the match: Andre Russell (WI)

- West Indies won the toss and elected to field.
- Sheldon Cottrell (WI) made his ODI debut.
- David Miller (SA) made his maiden ODI century.

=== 5th ODI ===
28 January
Scorecard

South Africa; 361/5 (42 overs)	v	West Indies; 230 (37.4 overs)
Hashim Amla 133 (105); Andre Russell 3/85 (8 overs)		Marlon Samuels 50 (47); Wayne Parnell 4/42 (9 overs)

South Africa won by 131 runs
Centurion Park, Centurion
Umpires: Johan Cloete (SA) and Sundaram Ravi (Ind)
Player of the match: Rilee Rossouw (SA)

- West Indies won the toss and elected to field.
- Match reduced to 42 overs a side due to rain.
- Hashim Amla and Rilee Rossouw set a new record for a highest 3rd wicket partnership in ODIs with 247 runs.

== Broadcasters ==
Country	TV Broadcaster(s)
Australia	Fox Sports
United Kingdom	Sky Sports
Pakistan	PTV Sports
Pakistan	TEN Sports
India	TEN Cricket
South Africa	SuperSport
