= Leeward Islands Cricket Association =

Cricket governing body

The Leeward Islands Cricket Association, also known as the Leeward Islands Cricket Board (more often since 2015), is the ruling body for cricket in the following Caribbean islands: Anguilla, Antigua and Barbuda (founding member in 1913), the British Virgin Islands, Montserrat (founding member in 1913), Nevis (admitted in 1949), Saint Kitts (founding member in 1913), Sint Maarten, and the United States Virgin Islands. Dominica is geographically a part of the Leeward Islands, but as it was part of the Windward Islands colony from 1940 until its independence, its cricket federation remains a part of the Windward Islands although it did participate in the first Leeward Islands tournament and was a founding member of the Leeward Islands Cricket Association in 1913.

== Member associations ==
- Anguilla Cricket Association – Anguilla national cricket team
- Antigua and Barbuda Cricket Association – Antigua and Barbuda national cricket team
- British Virgin Islands Cricket Association – British Virgin Islands national cricket team
- Montserrat Cricket Association – Montserrat national cricket team
- Nevis Cricket Association (for the island of Nevis alone) – Nevis national cricket team
- Saint Kitts Cricket Association (for the island of Saint Kitts alone) – Saint Kitts national cricket team
- Sint Maarten Cricket Association (for the Dutch part of Saint Martin Island) – Sint Maarten national cricket team
- United States Virgin Islands Cricket Association – United States Virgin Islands national cricket team

== See also ==
- Cricket West Indies
- Leeward Islands cricket team
- Windward Islands Cricket Board of Control
