= Orlanzo Jackson =

West Indies cricketer (born 1974)

Ivan Orlanzo Jackson (born 16 June 1974 in Georgetown, Saint Vincent and the Grenadines) is a West Indies cricketer who has played first-class and List A cricket for the Windward Islands.
