= Kenroy Peters =

West Indian cricketer (born 1982)

Personal information
- Full name: Keon Kenroy Peters
- Born: 24 February 1982 (age 44); Mesopotamia, Saint Vincent, Saint Vincent and the Grenadines
- Batting: Right-handed
- Bowling: Left-arm medium

International information
- National side: West Indies
- Only Test (cap 301): 26 December 2014 v South Africa

Domestic team information
- Years: Team
- 2000–2016/17: Windward Islands
- 2002/03, 2007/08: St Vincent and the Grenadines
- 2013: St Lucia Zouks

Career statistics
Competition	Test	FC	LA	T20
Matches	1	78	36	14
Runs scored	0	912	191	17
Batting average	0.00	10.48	27.28	8.50
100s/50s	0/0	0/1	0/0	0/0
Top score	0	52	38*	10*
Balls bowled	120	11,601	1,533	260
Wickets	2	232	38	10
Bowling average	34.50	20.37	27.26	34.30
5 wickets in innings	0	9	0	0
10 wickets in match	0	0	0	0
Best bowling	2/69	7/36	4/32	2/27
Catches/stumpings	0/–	25/–	7/–	1/–
- Source: Cricinfo, 26 November 2023

Keon Kenroy Peters (born 24 February 1982) is a St Vincent-born former cricketer who played one Test match for the West Indies against South Africa on 26 December 2014. At youth level, he represented the West Indies at the 2000 Under-19 Cricket World Cup. He played a number of first-class matches for Windward Islands.
