= John Eugene =

Saint Lucian cricketer

Personal information
- Born: 16 August 1970 (age 56); Gros Islet, Saint Lucia
- Batting: Right-handed
- Bowling: Right-arm medium

Domestic team information
- Years: Team
- 1990–2004: Windward Islands
- 2001: Northern Windward Islands
- 2002: Rest of Windward Islands
- Source: CricketArchive, 28 December 2015

John Eugene (born 16 August 1970) is a Saint Lucian former cricketer who played for the Windward Islands and several other teams in West Indian domestic cricket. He was a right-handed middle-order batsman.

A former Windwards under-19s player, Eugene made his senior debut for the Windward Islands in the 1989–90 Geddes Grant Shield, a limited-overs tournament. His first-class debut came a couple weeks later, in the 1989–90 Red Stripe Cup. Eugene scored his maiden first-class century the following season, making 111 against Barbados. At the end of the season, he was selected for a West Indies under-23s side that played a four-day fixture against the touring Australians. Eugene played two further matches for West Indies select teams within the next few years, appearing for West Indies A against England A during the 1991–92 season and then captaining the West Indies under-23s against the touring Pakistanis during the 1992–93 season.

Eugene missed several seasons in the late 1990s, but returned to form in the 2000–01 Busta Cup, scoring 406 runs from seven matches to lead the Windwards' run-scoring. His season included an innings of 139 against Guyana, his highest first-class score. Eugene played his final first-class matches for the Windwards during the 2002–03 Carib Beer Cup, and his final List A matches during the 2004–05 Regional One-Day Competition. Although a Saint Lucian by birth, he was for several years a resident of Sint Maarten, and in 2006 was selected for the Sint Maarten national team at the inaugural Stanford 20/20 tournament. He returned for the 2008 edition, aged 37, and against Saint Vincent and the Grenadines in the opening round scored 100 not out from 46 balls, including seven fours and six sixes. His innings was the first century in the competition's history and only the second Twenty20 hundred scored by a West Indian, but was not enough to win his team the match.
