= British Virgin Islands national cricket team =

The British Virgin Islands national cricket team has represented the British overseas territory of the British Virgin Islands in cricket. The team is not a member of the International Cricket Council, but is a member of the Leeward Islands Cricket Association, which itself is a member association of the West Indies Cricket Board, and players from the British Virgin Islands generally represent the Leeward Islands cricket team at domestic level and the West Indies at international level. The British Virgin Islands have however played as a separate entity in matches which held Twenty20 status, but has not appeared in first-class or List A cricket.

== History ==
A British Virgin Islands cricket team first appeared in West Indian cricket in the 1991 Leeward Islands Tournament against the United States Virgin Islands at the Lionel Roberts Stadium, Charlotte Amalie. Prior to that a Combined Virgin Islands team had taken part in the 1988 Leeward Islands Tournament. The following season the team played against a touring Marylebone Cricket Club side and throughout the 1990s it participated in the Leeward Islands One-Day tournament.

Its participation in that tournament continued until 1998 after which its place was taken by a reconstituted Combined Virgin Islands team before the BVI again started participating separately for the one-day tournaments in 2003 and 2004 while a Combined Virgin Islands team participated in the Leeward Islands 3-day tournament. In February 2002 the islands hosted their only first-class cricket match, when the Leeward Islands played the Windward Islands at the A.O. Shirley Recreation Ground, Roadtown. In 2005 the BVI and USVI again ceased to participate separately in all Leeward Islands tournaments (one day and three-day tournaments) and their places were taken by the Combined Virgin Islands until 2008 after which they participated separately again in all Leeward Islands tournaments.

As part of Allen Stanford's vision for cricket in the West Indies, the United States Virgin Islands were invited to take part in the 2006 Stanford 20/20, whose matches held official Twenty20 status. Stanford gave US$100,000 for their participation. Under the Management team of Debideen Manik and Charlie Jackson, they played a single match in the tournament, losing to Saint Lucia by 7 wickets in their preliminary round match. Two years later, they were invited to take part in the 2008 Stanford 20/20, playing a single preliminary round match against Dominica, which they lost by 66 runs.

Following the reorganisation of domestic Twenty20 cricket in the West Indies in the aftermath of the fraud convictions against Allen Stanford, the United States Virgin Islands were excluded from the revamped regional tournament. The team's last recorded appearance in the Leeward Islands One-Day Tournament came against Nevis in 2011.

Plying under their own flag they took part in the VI Explosion 20/20 Tournament featuring teams from the USVI (hosts), St Kitts/ Nevis, Dominica and Antigua. The team finished 3rd.

in 2017, Richard Fredericks was a reserve player for the Leeward Islands Cricket Board 20/20 squad, previously Maxford Pipe and Brent Dereitas had all played first class cricket for the Leewards.

== Notable players ==
See List of British Virgin Islands Twenty20 players and Category:British Virgin Islands cricketers
