= Cuba national cricket team =

Cuba
- Association: Cuban Cricket Commission

History
- Twenty20 debut: Cuba v. Sint Maarten (Saint George, Antigua; 25 January 2008)

International Cricket Council
- ICC status: Affiliate (2002–2013)
- ICC region: Americas

International cricket
- First international: Cuba v. Jamaica (Cuba; 1952)
- As of 4 September 2015

The Cuba national cricket team was the team that represented the Republic of Cuba in international cricket. The team was organised by the Cuban Cricket Commission (CCC), which became an affiliate member of the International Cricket Council (ICC) in 2002. However, the CCC had its membership revoked in 2013 for failing to adhere to ICC guidelines, so the team's current status is unclear.

A Cuban representative team was assembled as early as 1952, when the Jamaica national cricket team toured. However, the popularity of the sport (played mainly by Afro-Cubans descended from West Indian sugar workers), diminished rapidly after the Cuban Revolution, and the game was not revived until the late 1990s. Cuba was invited to participate in the 2008 edition of the Stanford 20/20, and was drawn to play Sint Maarten in its preliminary round match. However, the U.S. embargo meant the team was forced to withdraw, as the tournament's primary organiser, Allen Stanford, was an American citizen. Despite the match being cancelled, it was still given the status of an official Twenty20 match. An eight-match tour of Saint Vincent and the Grenadines was arranged as a replacement for the Stanford tournament, and Cuba won 2 of the 8 matches. Cuba were also invited to the 2010 Americas Championship Division Four tournament, played in Mexico, but again had to withdraw, having been prevented from leaving the country by the Cuban government.
