= Saint Kitts cricket team =

St Kitts
- Conference: Leeward Islands Cricket Association
- Association: St Kitts Cricket Association

International Cricket Council
- ICC status: Affiliate of Cricket West Indies (full member)
- ICC region: Americas
- As of 2023

The Saint Kitts cricket team is the representative team of the Caribbean island of Saint Kitts. The team is organised by the St Kitts Cricket Association (SKCA) which is a member of the Leeward Islands Cricket Association (LICA), in turn an affiliate of Cricket West Indies.

Players from Saint Kitts represent the Leeward Islands cricket team in West Indian domestic cricket and the West Indies cricket team in international cricket. Saint Kitts is the larger island in the Federation of Saint Kitts and Nevis – both islands field separate teams.

== History ==
The SKCA was founded in 1913 and in the same year became a founding member of the Leeward Islands Cricket Association, together with Antigua, Dominica and Montserrat.

St Kitts played in the Stanford 20/20 tournament in 2006 and 2008. It lost to Nevis in the first round of the 2006 tournament and to U.S. Virgin Islands in the preliminary round of the 2008 tournament.
