= Antigua and Barbuda national cricket team =

Antigua and Barbuda

Personnel
- Captain: Sylvester Joseph
- Coach: Ridley Jacobs

Team information
- Colours: Yellow, red, blue
- Home ground: Sir Vivian Richards Stadium Antigua Recreation Ground Stanford Cricket Ground

History
- Four Day wins: n/a
- WICB Cup wins: 0
- Twenty20 wins: 0

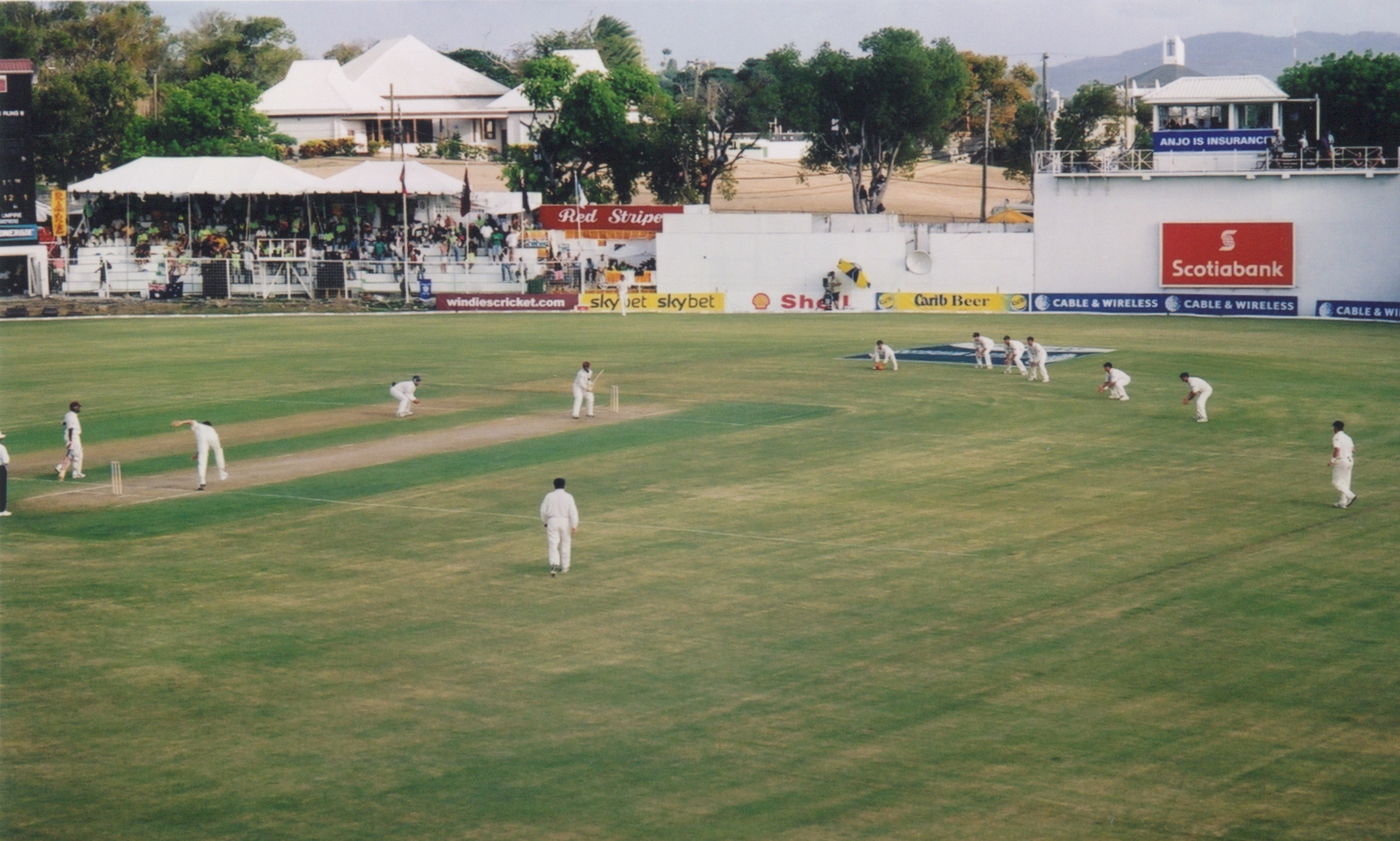
The Antigua Recreation Ground in St. John's is Antigua and Barbuda's national stadium, and has hosted several international cricket matches.

The Antigua and Barbuda national cricket team represents the country of Antigua and Barbuda in cricket. A cricket team representing Antigua and Barbuda has been active since the late 1890s. The Antigua and Barbuda Cricket Association is a member of the Leeward Islands Cricket Association, which itself is a member association of the West Indies Cricket Board, and players from Antigua and Barbuda generally represent the Leeward Islands cricket team at domestic level and the West Indies at international level. The team made its List A debut at the 1998 Commonwealth Games, and its Twenty20 debut at the 2006 Stanford 20/20 tournament. As of 2015, the team had played 14 List A matches and four Twenty20 matches. The team captain is Sylvester Joseph, while Ridley Jacobs is the team coach.

== History ==
In the mid-1890s, several touring English amateur sides played matches against Antiguan representative sides. R. S. Lucas' XI toured in 1895, winning by an innings and 69 runs, and A. A. Priestley's and Lord Hawke's XIs both toured in early 1897, winning by an innings and 96 runs and 259 runs, respectively. Part of the colony of the British Leeward Islands until 1958, and a member of the West Indies Federation between 1958 and 1962, Antigua played almost exclusively in the Leewards Islands Tournament, with occasional matches against touring teams, which included a "New Zealand Ambassadors" team in 1970, Kent in 1973 and 1979, and Canada in 1976. At West Indian domestic level, Antiguan and Barbudan cricketers represented the Leeward Islands cricket team, which debuted in the Shell Shield, the domestic first-class competition, in 1958. The Leeward Islands and the Windward Islands participated together as the Combined Islands cricket team from 1965 to 1981, when they separated again. Antigua and Barbuda gained independence in 1981, and from then on participated as "Antigua and Barbuda". The team toured Bermuda in September 1984, drawing a three-day match with the Bermuda national team.

At the 1998 Commonwealth Games held in Kuala Lumpur, Malaysia, Antigua and Barbuda fielded a separate team at the cricket tournament, as did Jamaica and Barbados. Matches at the tournament had List A status. Antigua and Barbuda were drawn in Group B, along with Australia, Canada, and India. The team's first match, against India at the Tenaga National Sports Complex, finished in a no-result due to rain. The team was captained by Dave Joseph, and included seven West Indies international players: Curtly Ambrose, Eldine Baptiste, Kenny Benjamin, Winston Benjamin, Ridley Jacobs, Sylvester Joseph, and Richie Richardson. After losing to Australia and defeating Canada, Antigua and Barbuda finished second in Group B over India due to a higher net run rate, but did not qualify for the semi-finals. The team's leading run-scorer at the games was Ridley Jacobs, who scored 74 runs, and the leading wicket-taker was Anthony Lake.

As part of a reorganisation of the structure of cricket in the West Indies, Antigua and Barbuda, along with the other Leeward and Windward Islands constituent members, fielded teams at the Red Stripe Bowl, the domestic one-day tournament, in the 2001–02, 2002–03, and 2003–04 seasons. The team was largely unsuccessful, and did not progress beyond the group stage. Antigua and Barbuda also participated in the Stanford 20/20 tournament in 2006 and 2008, being knocked out in the quarter-finals in both instances. The team played a number of matches against touring sides in the mid-2000s, including against England, Pakistan, Zimbabwe, and India cricket team.

== Grounds ==
The traditional home ground of Antigua and Barbuda is the Antigua Recreation Ground (pictured), the national stadium of the country, which has hosted a number of Test and One-Day International matches. Two further grounds, the Stanford Cricket Ground and Sir Vivian Richards Stadium, were constructed in 2004 and 2006 for use in the Stanford 20/20 and 2007 World Cup respectively, and have both been used in inter-island matches featuring Antigua and Barbuda.

== Players ==
=== International players ===
A number of Antigua players have represented the West Indies internationally.

- Apps denotes the number of appearances the player has made.
- Runs denotes the number of runs scored by the player.
- Wkts denotes the number of wickets taken by the player.

West Indies captains

Name	International career	Apps	Runs	Wkts	Apps	Runs	Wkts	Apps	Runs	Wkts	References											
Name	International career	Tests			ODIs			T20Is			References											
Andy Roberts	1974–1983	47	762	202	56	231	87	–	–	–												
Viv Richards	1974–1991	121	8,540	32	187	6,721	118	–	–	–												
Eldine Baptiste	1983–1990	10	233	16	43	184	36	–	–	–												
Richie Richardson	1983–1996	86	5,949	0	224	6,248	1	–	–	–												
Winston Benjamin	1986–1995	21	470	61	85	298	100	–	–	–												
Curtly Ambrose	1988–2000	98	1,439	405	176	639	225	–	–	–												
Kenny Benjamin	1992–1998	26	222	92	26	65	33	–	–	–												
Hamish Anthony	1995	–	–	–	3	23	3	–	–	–												
Ridley Jacobs	1996–2004	65	2,577	0	147	1,865	0	–	–	–												
Dave Joseph	1999	4	141	0	–	–	–	–	–	–												
Sylvester Joseph	2000–2007	5	147	0	13	161	0	–	–	–												
Kerry Jeremy	2000–2001	–	–	–	6	17	4	–	–	–												
Austin Richards	2007	–	–	–	1	2	0	1	10	0												
Devon Thomas	2009–2013	–	–	–	21	238	2	3	0	0												
Gavin Tonge	2009	1	25	1	5	10	5	1	0	1												
Anthony Martin	2011	–	–	–	9	10	11	1	0	1												
Rahkeem Cornwall	2019–	5	39	27	–	–	–	–	–	–		Alzarri Joseph	2016–	5	39	27	–	–	–	–	–	–

=== List A players: 1998 – 2003 ===
№	Name	First	Last	M	Runs	HS	Avg	100	50	W	BB	Ave	4/i	C	St	Ref
1	Earl Waldron	9 Sep. 1998	12 Oct. 2003	9	80	26	8.88	0	0	10	3/33	24.40	0	1	0	
2	Wilden Cornwall	9 Sep. 1998	12 Oct. 2003	12	218	103	19.81	1	0	12	4/40	23.66	1	2	0	
3	Richie Richardson	9 Sep. 1998	14 Sep. 1998	3	20	13	6.66	0	0	–	–	–	–	1	0	
4	Sylvester Joseph	9 Sep. 1998	12 Oct. 2003	13	312	83	26.00	0	1	–	–	–	–	9	0	
5	Dave Joseph	9 Sep. 1998	7 Oct. 2001	6	130	74	21.66	0	1	–	–	–	–	0	0	
6	Ian Tittle	9 Sep. 1998	12 Oct. 2003	9	197	52*	32.83	0	1	0	0/12	–	0	1	0	
7	Ridley Jacobs	9 Sep. 1998	12 Oct. 2003	11	274	76*	54.80	0	1	–	–	–	–	10	4	
8	Eldine Baptiste	9 Sep. 1998	14 Sep. 1998	3	29	22	9.66	0	0	2	1/4	18.00	0	2	0	
9	Winston Benjamin	9 Sep. 1998	14 Sep. 1998	3	23	15	7.66	0	0	1	1/35	59.00	0	0	0	
10	Curtly Ambrose	9 Sep. 1998	14 Sep. 1998	3	42	23	42.00	0	0	2	2/29	23.00	0	0	0	
11	Kenny Benjamin	9 Sep. 1998	14 Sep. 1998	3	6	5*	6.00	0	0	3	2/26	23.00	0	0	0	
12	Hayden Walsh	12 Sep. 1998	14 Sep. 1998	2	66	51	33.00	0	1	–	–	–	–	2	0	
13	Hamish Anthony	12 Sep. 1998	14 Sep. 1998	2	30	17	30.00	0	0	3	3/34	11.33	0	2	0	
14	Anthony Lake	14 Sep. 1998	12 Oct. 2003	11	140	54*	20.00	0	1	18	4/17	17.72	2	6	0	
15	Amwaa Prince	2 Oct. 2001	25 Aug. 2002	3	28	20	9.33	0	0	–	–	–	–	1	0	
16	Sean Bailey	2 Oct. 2001	25 Aug. 2002	6	115	48	19.16	0	0	6	3/30	16.50	0	3	0	
17	Kerry Jeremy	2 Oct. 2001	12 Oct. 2003	10	27	27	6.75	0	0	11	3/16	27.18	0	3	0	
18	Goldwyn Prince	2 Oct. 2001	2 Oct. 2001	1	1	1	1.00	0	0	0	0/19	–	0	0	0	
19	Ricky Christopher	2 Oct. 2001	2 Oct. 2001	1	–	–	–	–	–	0	0/39	–	0	0	0	
20	Bertel Baltimore	5 Oct. 2001	12 Oct. 2003	6	81	48	16.20	0	0	–	–	–	–	3	2	
21	Gregg Skepple	5 Oct. 2001	25 Aug. 2002	5	39	16	9.75	0	0	0	0/20	–	0	2	0	
22	Curtis Roberts	5 Oct. 2001	12 Oct. 2003	7	20	15	6.67	0	0	4	2/19	35.00	0	0	0	
23	Carl Simon	14 Aug. 2002	12 Oct. 2003	7	37	13*	12.33	0	0	12	4/21	15.83	1	3	0	
24	Adam Sanford ( (Dominica) )	14 Aug. 2002	17 Aug. 2002	2	16	16*	16.00	0	0	0	0/17	–	0	0	0	
25	Mali Richards ( (England) )	25 Aug. 2002	25 Aug. 2002	1	1	1	1.00	0	0	–	–	–	–	0	0	
26	Derryck Edwards	3 Oct. 2003	5 Oct. 2003	2	30	22	15.00	0	0	–	–	–	–	5	0	
27	Austin Richards	5 Oct. 2003	12 Oct. 2003	2	24	19	11.00	0	0	–	–	–	–	1	0	

=== Stanford Twenty20 players: 2006 & 2008 ===
№	Name	First	Last	M	Runs	HS	Avg	100	50	W	BB	Ave	4/i	C	St	Ref
1	Austin Richards	19 July 2006	17 Feb. 2008	4	72	36	18.00	0	0	–	–	–	–	0	0	
2	Derryck Edwards	19 July 2006	26 July 2006	2	33	33	16.50	0	0	2	2/17	27.00	0	1	0	
3	Anthony Lake	19 July 2006	26 July 2006	2	9	5	4.50	0	0	2	2/26	20.50	0	0	0	
4	Ridley Jacobs ‡	19 July 2006	26 July 2006	2	45	31	22.50	0	0	3	3/8	14.66	0	0	0	
5	Ian Tittle	19 July 2006	26 July 2006	2	10	6	5.00	0	0	–	–	–	–	2	0	
6	Dave Joseph	19 July 2006	26 July 2006	2	18	16	9.00	0	0	–	–	–	–	0	0	
7	Curtis Roberts	19 July 2006	9 Feb. 2008	3	45	36	22.50	0	0	0	0/17	–	0	0	0	
8	Gregg Skepple	19 July 2006	26 July 2006	2	19	14	9.50	0	0	–	–	–	–	0	0	
9	Bertel Baltimore †	19 July 2006	26 July 2006	2	45	45	22.50	0	0	–	–	–	–	1	1	
10	Kerry Jeremy	19 July 2006	26 July 2006	2	17	16*	–	0	0	0	0/22	–	0	0	0	
11	Gavin Tonge	19 July 2006	9 Feb. 2008	3	14	10*	–	0	0	3	2/16	26.00	0	0	0	
12	Sylvester Joseph ‡	9 Feb. 2008	17 Feb. 2008	2	70	63*	70.00	0	1	1	1/24	24.00	0	1	0	
13	Orlando Peters	9 Feb. 2008	17 Feb. 2008	2	52	32	26.00	0	0	–	–	–	–	1	0	
14	Wilden Cornwall	9 Feb. 2008	17 Feb. 2008	2	30	30	15.00	0	0	0	0/12	–	0	1	0	
15	Gavin Williams	9 Feb. 2008	9 Feb. 2008	1	11	11	11.00	0	0	–	–	–	–	0	0	
16	Justin Athanaze	9 Feb. 2008	17 Feb. 2008	2	21	21	10.50	0	0	2	2/30	21.00	0	1	0	
17	Carl Simon	9 Feb. 2008	17 Feb. 2008	2	13	9	6.50	0	0	1	1/20	36.00	0	1	0	
18	Juari Edwards †	9 Feb. 2008	17 Feb. 2008	2	24	21	12.00	0	0	–	–	–	–	2	1	
19	Anthony Martin	9 Feb. 2008	17 Feb. 2008	2	0	0*	–	0	0	3	2/25	15.33	0	0	0	
20	Larry Joseph	17 Feb. 2008	17 Feb. 2008	1	5	5	5.00	0	0	0	0/25	–	0	0	0	
21	Mali Richards	17 Feb. 2008	17 Feb. 2008	1	5	5	5.00	0	0	–	–	–	–	0	0	
22	Chad Hampson	17 Feb. 2008	17 Feb. 2008	1	7	7	7.00	0	0	3	3/23	7.66	0	1	0	

- Stanford 20/20 Squad 2006
- Stanford 20/20 Squad 2008

== Tournament history ==
=== Commonwealth Games ===
Commonwealth Games record
Year	Round	Position	GP	W	L	T	NR
(Malaysia) 1998	Group stage	8/16	3	1	1	0	1
Total	0 Title	1/1	3	1	1	0	1

== See also ==
- Antigua Hawksbills, a Twenty20 franchise
- List of Leeward Islands first-class cricketers
