= Saint Vincent and the Grenadines national cricket team =

Saint Vincent and the Grenadines

Personnel
- Captain: Sunil Ambris
- Coach: Nixon Mclean

Team information
- Colours: Yellow, Blue, Green
- Founded: 1946
- Home ground: Arnos Vale Stadium

History
- Four Day wins: n/a
- WICB Cup wins: 0
- Twenty20 wins: 0

The Saint Vincent and the Grenadines national cricket team is a cricket team representing Saint Vincent and the Grenadines and is a member of the Windward Islands Cricket Board of Control. For cricketing purposes, players from Saint Vincent and the Grenadines generally represent the Windward Islands at domestic level and the West Indies at international level. However, the St Vincent & Grenadines team did appear four times in its own right at List A level in the 2002–03 Red Stripe Bowl, the domestic one day competition. The team had also played as a separate entity in matches which held Twenty20 status (Stanford 20/20) and they continues to compete in domestic Windward Islands cricket competitions including the Windward Islands two-day and Twenty20 cricket championships.

== Players ==
=== International players ===
A number of St Vincent & Grenadines cricketers have represented the West Indies internationally.

- Apps denotes the number of appearances the player has made.
- Runs denotes the number of runs scored by the player.
- Wkts denotes the number of wickets taken by the player.

Name	International career	Apps	Runs	Wkts	Apps	Runs	Wkts	Apps	Runs	Wkts	References
Name	International career	Tests			ODIs			T20Is			References
Alphonso Roberts	1956	1	28	0	–	–	–	–	–	–	
Mike Findlay	1969–1973	10	212	0	–	–	–	–	–	–	
Winston Davis	1983–1988	15	202	45	35	28	39	–	–	–	
Ian Allen	1991	2	5	5	–	–	–	–	–	–	
Cameron Cuffy	1994–2002	15	58	43	41	62	41	–	–	–	
Nixon McLean	1996–2003	19	368	44	45	314	46	–	–	–	
Deighton Butler	2005–2006	–	–	–	5	25	3	1	0	0	
Miles Bascombe	2011	–	–	–	–	–	–	1	3	0	
Kenroy Peters	2014	1	0	2	–	–	–	–	–	–	
Delorn Johnson	2015	–	–	–	–	–	–	–	–	–	
Jomel Warrican	2015	7	138	21	-	-	-	-	-	-	
Kesrick Williams	2016	-	-	-	8	19	9	18	6	30	
Sunil Ambris	2017	6	166	-	1	38	-	-	-	-	
Obed McCoy	2018	-	-	-	2	-	4	-	-	-	

Many other Vincentian players have represented the Windward Islands cricket team domestically in the West Indies Regional Super50, Regional Four Day Competition and the Caribbean Twenty20.

=== St Vincent & Grenadines players on the current Windward Islands team ===
- Sunil Ambris
- Kenneth Dember

=== See also ===
List of Windward Islands first-class cricketers

== Squad ==
=== Current squad ===
Players with international caps are listed in bold.

No.	Name	Birth date	Batting style	Bowling style	Notes
Batsmen
-	**Miles Bascombe**	12 January 1986 (age 40)	Right-handed	–	
-	Sunil Ambris	23 March 1993 (age 33)	Right-handed	-	
-	Donwell Hector	31 October 1988 (age 37)	Right-handed	Right arm off break	
-	Atticus Browne	12 December 1991 (age 34)	Left-handed	Right arm off break	
-	Hyron Shallow	24 September 1982 (age 43)	Right-handed	Right arm off break	
-	Marvin Small		Right-handed		
-	Desron Maloney		Right-handed		
All-rounders
-	Romel Currency	7 May 1982 (age 44)	Right-handed	Right arm off break	Vice-Captain
-	Keron Cottoy	14 November 1989 (age 36)	Left-handed	Right arm leg break	
-	Gidron Pope		Right-handed	Right arm off break	
-	Kenneth Dembar		Right-handed	Right arm off break	
-	Casmond Walters		Right-handed	Right arm off break	
Wicket-keepers
-	Lindon James	30 December 1984 (age 41)	Right-handed	–	Captain
-	Salvan Browne	19 March 1982 (age 44)	Right-handed	–	
Bowlers
-	Delorn Johnson	15 September 1988 (age 37)	Left-handed	Left arm fast-medium	
-	Alston Bobb	17 January 1984 (age 42)	Left-handed	Slow left-arm orthodox	
-	**Kenroy Peters**	24 February 1982 (age 44)	Right-handed	Left arm medium pace	
-	Ray Jordan	21 October 1994 (age 31)	Right-handed	Right arm fast-medium	
-	Kesrick Williams	17 January 1990 (age 36)	Right-handed	Right arm fast-medium	
-	Rodney Lawrence		Right-handed	Right arm off break	
-	Solomon Bascombe	15 September 2004 (age 21)	Right-handed	Right arm fast-medium	

- 2014 St Vincent & Grenadines 32 man trial squad selected for the 2014 Windward Islands domestic 2-day and 20/20 Championships.
- 2014 St Vincent & Greanadines 20 man training squad selected for the 2014 Windward Islands domestic 2-day and 20/20 Championships.

=== 2002/03 Red Stripe Bowl Squad (List A) ===
Players with international caps are listed in bold.

No.	Name	Birth date	Batting style	Bowling style	Notes
Batsmen
3	Miles Bascombe	12 January 1986 (age 40)	Right-handed	–	
5	Hyron Shallow	24 September 1982 (age 43)	Right-handed	Right arm off break	
11	Romel Currency	7 May 1982 (age 44)	Right-handed	Right arm off break	
12	Donwell Hector	31 October 1988 (age 37)	Right-handed	Right arm off break	
All-rounders
2	Othhneil Baptiste	9 December 1981 (age 44)	Right-handed	Right arm medium-fast	
7	Kenroy Martin	8 January 1979 (age 47)	Left-handed	Right arm medium pace	
Wicket-keepers
10	Lindon James	30 December 1984 (age 41)	Right-handed	–	
Bowlers
1	**Deighton Butler**	14 July 1974 (age 52)	Left-handed	Left arm fast-medium	Club captain
4	Alston Bobb	17 January 1984 (age 42)	Left-handed	Slow left-arm orthodox	
6	Dyke Cato	2 August 1979 (age 46)	Right-handed	Right arm off break	
8	Kenroy Peters	24 February 1982 (age 44)	Right-handed	Left arm medium pace	
14	Orlanzo Jackson	16 June 1974 (age 52)	Right-handed	Right arm leg break	

== Stanford 20/20 ==
The Saint Vincent & Greanadines national team competed at the 2006 and 2007/08 Stanford 20/20 tournaments held in Antigua.

- 2006 SVG Stanford 20/20 Squad
- 2008 SVG Stanford 20/20 Squad

== National cricket stadium ==
Stadium	Country	Capacity
Arnos Vale Stadium	St. Vincent and the Grenadines	18,000
