= United States Virgin Islands national cricket team =

United States Virgin Islands

Personnel
- Captain: Unknown
- Coach: Unknown

Team information
- Colours: Lime, green
- Home ground: Addelita Cancryn Junior High School Ground

History
- Four Day wins: n/a
- WICB Cup wins: n/a
- Twenty20 wins: 0

The United States Virgin Islands national cricket team has represented the United States unincorporated territory of the United States Virgin Islands in cricket. The team is not a member of the International Cricket Council, but is a member of the Leeward Islands Cricket Association, which itself is a member association of the West Indies Cricket Board, and players from the United States Virgin Islands generally represent the Leeward Islands cricket team at domestic level and the West Indies at international level. The United States Virgin Islands have however played as a separate entity in matches which held Twenty20 status, but has not appeared in first-class or List A cricket.

== History ==
A United States Virgin Islands cricket team first appeared in West Indian cricket in the 1991 Leeward Islands Tournament against the British Virgin Islands at the Lionel Roberts Stadium, Charlotte Amalie. Prior to that a Combined Virgin Islands team had taken part in the 1988 Leeward Islands Tournament. The following season the team played against a touring Marylebone Cricket Club side and throughout the 1990s it participated in the Leeward Islands One-Day tournament.

Its participation in that tournament continued until 1998 after which its place was taken by a reconstituted Combined Virgin Islands team before the USVI again started participating separately for the one-day tournaments in 2003 and 2004 while a Combined Virgin Islands team participated in the Leeward Islands 3-day tournament. It was in February 2003 that the islands first hosted first-class cricket, with West Indies B playing Guyana at the Paul E. Joseph Stadium, Frederiksted. In March of that same year, the Leeward Islands played their first-class cricket on the islands for the first time when they played Trinidad and Tobago in the 2002/03 Carib Beer Cup, with the ground having held five further first-class matches since. In 2005 the USVI and BVI again ceased to participate separately in all Leeward Islands tournaments (one day and three-day tournaments) and their places were taken by the Combined Virgin Islands until 2008 after which they participated separately again in all Leeward Islands tournaments.

As part of Allen Stanford's vision for cricket in the West Indies, the United States Virgin Islands were invited to take part in the 2006 Stanford 20/20, whose matches held official Twenty20 status. Stanford gave US$100,000 for their participation. They played two matches in the tournament, defeating Sint Maarten by 47 runs in their preliminary round match, before losing in the first round to St Vincent and the Grenadines by 5 wickets. Two years later, they were invited to take part in the 2008 Stanford 20/20, where the team was trained by Desmond Haynes and coached by former Leeward Islands cricketer Livingston Harris. They won their preliminary round match against St Kitts by 4 wickets, before losing in the first round to Antigua and Barbuda by 24 runs.

Following the reorganisation of domestic Twenty20 cricket in the West Indies in the aftermath of the fraud convictions against Allen Stanford, the United States Virgin Islands were excluded from the revamped regional tournament. The team's last appearance in the Leeward Islands One-Day Tournament came against Montserrat in 2009.

== Notable players ==
See List of United States Virgin Islands Twenty20 players and Category:United States Virgin Islands cricketers
