= Sint Maarten national cricket team =

Sint Maarten

Personnel
- Captain: Kenroy David
- Coach: Rishie Singh

Team information
- Colours: Black, blue, yellow
- Home ground: Carib Lumber Ball Park

History
- Four Day wins: n/a
- WICB Cup wins: n/a
- Twenty20 wins: 0
- Official website: None

The Sint Maarten national cricket team has represented the Dutch Overseas Territory of Sint Maarten in cricket. The team is not a member of the International Cricket Council, but is a member of the Leeward Islands Cricket Association, which itself is a member association of the West Indies Cricket Board, and players from Sint Maarten generally represent the Leeward Islands cricket team at domestic level and the West Indies at international level. Sint Maarten has however played as a separate entity in matches which held Twenty20 status, but has not appeared in first-class or List A cricket. The team's current coach is Rishie Singh, who was appointed in 2009. As of September 2014, the team's captain is Kenroy David.

== History ==
A Sint Maarten cricket team is first recorded in West Indian cricket in 2000 against touring English county side Leicestershire. The team made its debut in the NAGICO Leeward Islands One-Day tournament against the British Virgin Islands in 2003, and has continued to play in the tournament since then. Sint Maarten finished as runners-up in the 2009 edition.

In 2004, Sint Maarten hosted first-class cricket for the first time when the Leeward Islands played the Windward Islands in the 2003/04 Carib Cup at the Carib Lumber Ball Park, Philipsburg. To date the Carib Lumber Ball Park has played host to six first-class and one List A match.

Sint Maarten were invited to take part in the 2006 Stanford 20/20, whose matches held official Twenty20 status. They played one match in the tournament against the United States Virgin Islands, which they lost by 47 runs, resulting in their elimination from the tournament. Two years later, they were invited to take part in the 2008 Stanford 20/20, where they were due to play Cuba in the preliminary round. However, as the tournament was organised by Allen Stanford, a US citizen, Cuba were barred from participating in the tournament due to the United States embargo against Cuba, and Sint Maarten were thus granted a bye into the next round. They played Saint Vincent and the Grenadines in the next round, and were beaten by 10 runs. These matches mark Sint Maarten's only major appearances in cricket.

== Notable players ==
See List of Sint Maarten Twenty20 players and Category:Sint Maarten cricketers
