= Stanford 20/20 =

Past cricket tournament

- Countries: West Indies
- Format: Twenty20
- First edition: 2006
- Latest edition: 2008
- Tournament format: Knockout
- Number of teams: 19 (2006), 21 (2008)
- Current champion: Trinidad & Tobago
- Qualification: Stanford Super Series

The Stanford 20/20 was a short-lived cricket tournament in the Caribbean island of Antigua. It was held first in July and August 2006 in the West Indies at the Stanford Cricket Ground, St. John's, Antigua and Barbuda, and then again in the same place in 2008. It was a variety of the popular Twenty20 format, which had been first introduced in English cricket in 2003. The tournament was separate to the Stanford Super Series, which was held in late 2008.

The tournament was privately devised and funded by wealthy American businessman Allen Stanford, who held Antiguan dual nationality. It has been alleged that Stanford's creation of the tournament was a method of laundering his income from the fraudulent business schemes for which he is now serving a lengthy penal sentence in the United States.

19 teams took part in the inaugural knock-out tournament and 20 teams took part in the second tournament (although 21 teams were originally scheduled to take part). The 2008 season was part of the official calendar of the WICB.

== 2006 tournament ==
In 2006 a total of 16 teams was in the competition and the final was played between Guyana led by Ramnaresh Sarwan and Trinidad led by Daren Ganga, and what a trilling final it was, one where Guyana took the trophy and 1 million USD home, Travis Dowlin was an instrumental part of them winning scoring 80 from 60 but had to retire hurt and Ramnaresh Sarwan saw them to the finish line with his 49 from 40. This was the beginning of T20 cricket in the West Indies.

=== Qualifying matches ===
11 July
Scorecard

| United States Virgin Islands; 145/7 (20 overs) | v | Sint Maarten; 98 (18 overs) |

United States Virgin Islands won by 47 runs
Stanford Cricket Ground, Coolidge, Antigua

11 July
Scorecard

| Cayman Islands; 175/4 (20 overs) | v | Bahamas; 118/9 (20 overs) |

Cayman Islands won by 57 runs
Stanford Cricket Ground, Coolidge, Antigua

12 July
Scorecard

| British Virgin Islands; 105/9 (20 overs) | v | (Saint Lucia) St Lucia; 106/3 (14.3 overs) |

St Lucia won by 7 wickets
Stanford Cricket Ground, Coolidge, Antigua

=== Bracket ===
First round
Guyana | 116/2
Montserrat | 115/8
Jamaica | 75/1
Bermuda | 74
Grenada | 84/4
Dominica | 83
(Saint Vincent and the Grenadines) St Vincent | 96/5
United States Virgin Islands | 92
Nevis | 104/3
(Saint Kitts and Nevis) St Kitts | 100
Antigua | 146/9
(Saint Lucia) St Lucia | 98/9
Trinidad and Tobago | 93/2
Cayman Islands | 92
Barbados | 141/6
Anguilla | 103/7

Second round
Guyana | 168/7
Jamaica | 163/6
Grenada (D/L) | 70/3
(Saint Vincent and the Grenadines) St Vincent | 122/7
Nevis | 213/3
Antigua | 170/9
Trinidad and Tobago | 142/9
Barbados | 96

Semifinals
Guyana | 160/4
Grenada | 158/8
Nevis | 136/9
Trinidad and Tobago | 210/6

Finals
Guyana | 176/5
Trinidad and Tobago | 175/6

== 2008 tournament ==
Initially it was planned to include two additional teams from the region in the 2008 competition, Cuba and the Turks and Caicos Islands, increasing the number of teams participating to twenty-one (21).

However, since the application required by US citizens (such as Stanford himself) and organisations to interact with the island under the United States embargo against Cuba was rejected, Sint Maarten (Cuba's destined opponent in the preliminary round) received a bye.

=== Preliminary matches ===
25 January
Scorecard

| Sint Maarten | v | Cuba |

Match cancelled
Stanford Cricket Ground, Coolidge, Antigua

- Cuba were barred from participating in the tournament; St Maarten received a bye to the next round

26 January 2008
Scorecard

| St Lucia (Saint Lucia); 134/8 (20 overs) | v | Cayman Islands; 88/8 (20 overs) |

St Lucia won by 46 runs
Stanford Cricket Ground, Coolidge, Antigua

27 January
Scorecard

| Dominica; 139/7 (20 overs) | v | British Virgin Islands; 73 (17.2 overs) |

Dominica won by 66 runs
Stanford Cricket Ground, Coolidge, Antigua

29 January
Scorecard

| Turks and Caicos Islands; 67/9 (20 overs) | v | Montserrat; 70/1 (7.3 overs) |

Montserrat won by 9 wickets
Stanford Cricket Ground, Coolidge, Antigua

30 January
Scorecard

| St Kitts (Saint Kitts and Nevis); 130/8 (20 overs) | v | United States Virgin Islands; 131/6 (19.2 overs) |

United States Virgin Islands won by 4 wickets
Stanford Cricket Ground, Coolidge, Antigua

=== Brackets ===
First round
(Saint Vincent and the Grenadines) St Vincent and the Grenadines | 168/4
Sint Maarten | 158/6
Trinidad and Tobago | 106/2
(Saint Lucia) St Lucia | 105/9
Grenada | 177/6
Anguilla | 161/4
Barbados | 103/8
Dominica | 77
Jamaica | 191/4
Bahamas | 73/7
Nevis | 185/6
Montserrat | 111
Antigua | 153/8
United States Virgin Islands | 131/6
Guyana | 63/1
Bermuda | 62/9

Second round
(Saint Vincent and the Grenadines) St Vincent and the Grenadines | 107/8
Trinidad and Tobago | 166/7
Grenada | 98
Barbados | 152/4
Jamaica | 123/2
Nevis | 121/8
Antigua | 156/9
Guyana | 146/9

Semifinals
Trinidad and Tobago | 120
Barbados | 115/6
Jamaica | 143/7
Guyana | 142/8

Finals
Trinidad and Tobago | 94/1
Jamaica | 93

== See also ==
- Stanford Super Series
