= 2018–19 Regional Four Day Competition =

Cricket tournament

- Dates: 6 December 2018 – 17 March 2019
- Administrator: CWI
- Cricket format: First-class (four-day)
- Tournament format: Double round-robin
- Champions: Guyana (11th title)
- Participants: 6
- Matches: 30
- Most runs: Devon Smith (745)
- Most wickets: Rahkeem Cornwall (54)

The 2018–19 Regional Four Day Competition was the 53rd edition of the Regional Four Day Competition, the domestic first-class cricket competition for the countries of the Cricket West Indies (CWI). The competition started on 6 December 2018 and concluded on 17 March 2019. Six teams contested the tournament – Barbados, Guyana, Jamaica, the Leeward Islands, Trinidad and Tobago, and the Windward Islands. Guyana were the defending champions. The players' draft for the tournament took place in May 2018.

Ahead of the final round of fixtures, Guyana had a 23-point lead over their nearest rivals, the Leeward Islands, with the Leeward Islands needing to score the maximum of 24 points in their last game to win the tournament. Guyana were confirmed as champions, after the Leeward Islands were bowled out for 90 runs in the first innings of their final match. The Leeward Islands would then go on to declare their second innings on 83/2, still 18 runs behind Barbados, and therefore lose the match. This was in an attempt to finish ahead of Barbados in the final table, but with a miscalculation on the points required, the Leeward Islands finished 0.2 points behind Barbados.

== Squads ==
Prior to the start of the tournament, the following squads were selected in the Professional Cricket League draft:

Barbados	Guyana	Jamaica	Leeward Islands	Trinidad and Tobago	Windward Islands
Anthony Alleyne; Shamarh Brooks; Jonathan Carter; Dominic Drakes; Justin Greaves; Keon Harding; Chemar Holder; Aaron Jones; Marquino Mindley; Shayne Moseley; Mario Rampersaud; Shamar Springer; Kevin Stoute; Tevyn Walcott; Hayden Walsh Jr.	Christopher Barnwell; Anthony Bramble; Tagenarine Chanderpaul; Chandrapaul Hemraj; Tevin Imlach; Leon Johnson; Keon Joseph; Ramaal Lewis; Gudakesh Motie; Veerasammy Permaul; Akshaya Persaud; Sherfane Rutherford; Romario Shepherd; Vishaul Singh; Javier Spencer	Fabian Allen; Dennis Bulli; John Campbell; Assad Fudadin; Derval Green; Brandon King; Reynard Leveridge; Andre McCarthy; Nikita Miller; Paul Palmer; Steven Taylor; Aldane Thomas; Oshane Thomas; Chadwick Walton; Kenroy Williams	Sheeno Berridge; Nelson Bolan; Keacy Carty; Rahkeem Cornwall; Sheldon Cottrell; Jahmar Hamilton; Montcin Hodge; Damion Jacobs; Jeremiah Louis; Jason Peters; Orlando Peters; Ross Powell; Akeem Saunders; Devon Thomas; Terrence Warde	Yannic Cariah; Bryan Charles; Joshua Da Silva; Kyle Hope; Amir Jangoo; Imran Khan; Jason Mohammed; Khary Pierre; Isaiah Rajah; Denesh Ramdin; Marlon Richards; Odean Smith; Jeremy Solozano; Daniel St Clair; Tion Webster	Audy Alexander; Alick Athanaze; Roland Cato; Kirk Edwards; Taryck Gabriel; Delorn Johnson; Ray Jordan; Shermon Lewis; Kyle Mayers; Obed McCoy; Shane Shillingford; Denis Smith; Devon Smith; Tyrone Theophile; Josh Thomas

== Points table ==
Team	Pld	W	L	D	T	Pts
Guyana	10	7	3	0	0	154.2
Barbados	10	6	4	0	0	134.2
Leeward Islands	10	6	3	1	0	134.0
Trinidad and Tobago	10	4	5	1	0	112.4
Jamaica	10	3	7	0	0	97.2
Windward Islands	10	3	7	0	0	92.0

Champions

== Fixtures ==
=== Round 1 ===
6–9 December 2018
Scorecard

Guyana	v	Windward Islands
223 (69.1 overs); Vishaul Singh 74 (150); Shane Shillingford 4/61 (24.1 overs)		187 (59.1 overs); Alick Athanaze 34 (80); Clinton Pestano 4/46 (14 overs)
310/4d (108.1 overs); Tagenarine Chanderpaul 84* (334); Delorn Johnson 1/44 (14 overs)		222 (76.2 overs); Alick Athanaze 64* (138); Veerasammy Permaul 3/56 (23 overs)

Guyana won by 125 runs
Daren Sammy Cricket Ground, Gros Islet
Umpires: Joel Wilson and Deighton Butler

- Windward Islands won the toss and elected to field.
- Tevin Imlach (Guyana), Alick Athanaze and Josh Thomas (Windward Islands) all made their first-class debuts.

6–9 December 2018
Scorecard

Leeward Islands	v	Barbados
252 (75.2 overs); Keacy Carty 113 (198); Hayden Walsh 5/75 (16.2 overs)		248 (113.2 overs); Jonathan Carter 63 (185); Alzarri Joseph 4/48 (25 overs)
165 (57.3 overs); Jeremiah Louis 38 (64); Miguel Cummins 3/29 (14 overs)		135 (51.5 overs); Shamarh Brooks 32 (76); Terrence Warde 4/33 (15.5 overs)

Leeward Islands won by 34 runs
Three Ws Oval, Cave Hill
Umpires: Jonathan Blades and Verdayne Smith
Player of the match: Keacy Carty (Leeward Islands)

- Leeward Islands won the toss and elected to bat.

=== Round 2 ===
13–16 December 2018
Scorecard

Barbados	v	Jamaica
167 (60.2 overs); Jonathan Carter 51 (116); Nikita Miller 4/53 (24 overs)		248 (80.4 overs); John Campbell 78 (128); Jomel Warrican 8/89 (34.4 overs)
187 (74.4 overs); Shayne Moseley 48 (145); Nikita Miller 6/76 (37 overs)		65 (18 overs); John Campbell 19 (13); Miguel Cummins 4/19 (6 overs)

Barbados won by 41 runs
Three Ws Oval, Cave Hill
Umpires: Nigel Duguid and Leslie Reifer
Player of the match: Jomel Warrican (Barbados)

- Barbados won the toss and elected to bat.

13–16 December 2018
Scorecard

Leeward Islands	v	Guyana
182 (62.3 overs); Devon Thomas 58 (74); Romario Shepherd 4/36 (14 overs)		289 (115.4 overs); Vishaul Singh 90 (209); Rahkeem Cornwall 4/48 (29 overs)
138 (58 overs); Rahkeem Cornwall 27 (55); Veerasammy Permaul 5/57 (25 overs)		32/1 (6.3 overs); Leon Johnson 15* (19); Sheeno Berridge 1/3 (1 over)

Guyana won by 9 wickets
Sir Vivian Richards Stadium, Antigua
Umpires: Joel Wilson and Jacqueline Williams
Player of the match: Veerasammy Permaul (Guyana)

- Guyana won the toss and elected to field.

13–16 December 2018
Scorecard

Windward Islands	v	Trinidad and Tobago
206 (68.1 overs); Kirk Edwards 55 (96); Imran Khan 7/47 (22.1 overs)		225 (62.1 overs); Jeremy Solozano 104 (178); Shane Shillingford 6/74 (27.1 overs)
288 (96.5 overs); Roland Cato 103 (216); Bryan Charles 5/113 (36 overs)		193 (75 overs); Joshua Da Silva 41 (93); Shane Shillingford 6/73 (35 overs)

Windward Islands won by 76 runs
Brian Lara Stadium, Tarouba
Umpires: Lyndon Rajkumar and Gregory Brathwaite
Player of the match: Shane Shillingford (Windward Islands)

- Windward Islands won the toss and elected to bat.
- Joshua Da Silva (Trinidad and Tobago) made his first-class debut.

=== Round 3 ===
4–7 January 2019
Scorecard

Leeward Islands	v	Trinidad and Tobago
425 (126.4 overs); Montcin Hodge 158 (343); Shannon Gabriel 3/54 (21 overs)		252 (84 overs); Jeremy Solozano 80 (183); Rahkeem Cornwall 4/73 (37 overs)
168/6d (46 overs); Montcin Hodge 77* (131); Shannon Gabriel 3/35 (9 overs)		96 (39.3 overs); Jeremy Solozano 42 (100); Alzarri Joseph 4/22 (12 overs)

Leeward Islands won by 245 runs
Brian Lara Stadium, Tarouba
Umpires: Patrick Gustard and Danesh Ramdhanie
Player of the match: Montcin Hodge (Leeward Islands)

- Leeward Islands won the toss and elected to bat.

4–7 January 2019
Scorecard

Guyana	v	Barbados
548 (147.1 overs); Chandrapaul Hemraj 144 (172); Ashley Nurse 4/122 (38 overs)		360 (105.2 overs); Shane Dowrich 81 (113); Veerasammy Permaul 4/124 (35 overs)
48/4 (8.3 overs); Raymon Reifer 15* (15); Kemar Roach 2/18 (4 overs)		232 (74 overs) (f/o); Roston Chase 68 (150); Veerasammy Permaul 4/73 (25 overs)

Guyana won by 6 wickets
Kensington Oval, Bridgetown
Umpires: Carl Tuckett and Gregory Brathwaite
Player of the match: Chandrapaul Hemraj (Guyana)

- Barbados won the toss and elected to field.

4–7 January 2019
Scorecard

Jamaica	v	Windward Islands
210 (77.1 overs); Assad Fudadin 81 (231); Kavem Hodge 4/40 (20 overs)		113 (48.5 overs); Kirk Edwards 29 (75); Rovman Powell 5/23 (7 overs)
189 (71 overs); Assad Fudadin 48 (175); Josh Thomas 4/44 (19 overs)		289/5 (107.4 overs); Kirk Edwards 76 (192); Rovman Powell 2/48 (14 overs)

Windward Islands won by 5 wickets
Sabina Park, Kingston
Umpires: Leslie Reifer and Christopher Taylor
Player of the match: Kirk Edwards (Windward Islands)

- Jamaica won the toss and elected to bat.

=== Round 4 ===
10–13 January 2019
Scorecard

Guyana	v	Windward Islands
454/9d (148 overs); Anthony Bramble 168 (153); Josh Thomas 4/94 (25 overs)		209 (64.1 overs); Alick Athanaze 66 (114); Keemo Paul 6/57 (17 overs)
121/2 (18.3 overs); Shimron Hetmyer 61 (29); Kavem Hodge 1/21 (2.3 overs)		361 (107.3 overs) (f/o); Kirk Edwards 139 (186); Keemo Paul 4/72 (18 overs)

Guyana won by 8 wickets
Providence Stadium, Guyana
Umpires: Nigel Duguid and Jonathan Blades
Player of the match: Keemo Paul (Guyana)

- Guyana won the toss and elected to bat.

10–13 January 2019
Scorecard

Trinidad and Tobago	v	Jamaica
203 (66 overs); Yannic Cariah 61 (116); Nikita Miller 5/62 (18 overs)		112 (38.3 overs); Chadwick Walton 35 (35); Anderson Phillip 3/26 (8 overs)
233 (92.4 overs); Khary Pierre 46 (142); Nikita Miller 7/87 (32.4 overs)		167 (59 overs); Oraine Williams 56 (67); Imran Khan 5/59 (24 overs)

Trinidad and Tobago won by 157 runs
Sabina Park, Kingston
Umpires: Christopher Taylor and Deighton Butler
Player of the match: Khary Pierre (Trinidad and Tobago)

- Jamaica won the toss and elected to field.

=== Round 5 ===
17–20 January 2019
Scorecard

Guyana	v	Leeward Islands
196 (67.5 overs); Christopher Barnwell 58 (83); Rahkeem Cornwall 4/70 (21.5 overs)		175 (58.1 overs); Damion Jacobs 34* (43); Clinton Pestano 4/50 (13 overs)
269 (98.3 overs); Clinton Pestano 46 (87); Rahkeem Cornwall 6/70 (39 overs)		296/8 (108.3 overs); Montcin Hodge 127 (320); Veerasammy Permaul 4/43 (34 overs)

Leeward Islands won by 2 wickets
Providence Stadium, Guyana
Umpires: Patrick Gustard and Shannon Crawford
Player of the match: Montcin Hodge (Leeward Islands)

- Guyana won the toss and elected to bat.

17–20 January 2019
Scorecard

Windward Islands	v	Jamaica
285 (98.2 overs); Devon Smith 124 (208); Dennis Bulli 5/94 (22 overs)		272 (111.5 overs); Chadwick Walton 125 (257); Larry Edwards 4/79 (38.5 overs)
198 (57.1 overs); Kavem Hodge 52 (75); Dennis Bulli 5/54 (16.1 overs)		212/6 (74.4 overs); Chadwick Walton 79 (135); Tyrone Theophile 4/44 (18 overs)

Jamaica won by 4 wickets
National Cricket Stadium, Grenada
Umpires: Carl Tuckett and Zahid Bassarath
Player of the match: Chadwick Walton (Jamaica

- Jamaica won the toss and elected to field.

17–20 January 2019
Scorecard

Trinidad and Tobago	v	Barbados
170 (60.4 overs); Yannic Cariah 36 (108); Kevin Stoute 6/35 (20.4 overs)		215 (71.3 overs); Shamar Springer 47 (85); Odean Smith 3/32 (16 overs)
103 (48.4 overs); Odean Smith 28 (35); Shamar Springer 4/24 (12.4 overs)		59/3 (17.2 overs); Jonathan Carter 25* (17); Anderson Phillip 2/21 (7 overs)

Barbados won by 7 wickets
Brian Lara Stadium, Tarouba
Umpires: Christopher Taylor and Danesh Ramdhanie
Player of the match: Kevin Stoute (Barbados)

- Trinidad and Tobago won the toss and elected to bat.
- Nicholas Kirton (Barbados) made his first-class debut.

=== Round 6 ===
31 January–3 February 2019
Scorecard

Trinidad and Tobago	v	Guyana
108 (38.4 overs); Tion Webster 19 (31); Keemo Paul 3/26 (10 overs)		150 (31.4 overs); Keemo Paul 66* (36); Imran Khan 3/22 (2.4 overs)
317 (109.1 overs); Jason Mohammed 83 (202); Raymon Reifer 4/64 (19.1 overs)		182 (67.2 overs); Romario Shepherd 50 (58); Imran Khan 3/45 (11.2 overs)

Trinidad and Tobago won by 93 runs
Queen's Park Oval, Port of Spain
Umpires: Jacqueline Williams and Zahid Bassarath
Player of the match: Keemo Paul (Guyana)

- Guyana won the toss and elected to field.

31 January–3 February 2019
Scorecard

Windward Islands	v	Barbados
470/8d (130.4 overs); Devon Smith 199 (352); Shamar Springer 2/72 (20.4 overs)		253 (70.4 overs); Jonathan Carter 64 (102); Larry Edwards 5/67 (16.4 overs)
34/2 (10.3 overs); Roland Cato 11 (19); Chemar Holder 1/8 (2 overs)		250 (88.2 overs) (f/o); Shayne Moseley 51 (131); Kavem Hodge 3/79 (31 overs)

Windward Islands won by 8 wickets
Kensington Oval, Bridgetown
Umpires: Leslie Reifer and Danesh Ramdhanie
Player of the match: Devon Smith (Windward Islands)

- Windward Islands won the toss and elected to bat.

31 January–3 February 2019
Scorecard

Leeward Islands	v	Jamaica
204 (57.5 overs); Jahmar Hamilton 65 (87); Jerome Taylor 5/28 (11.5 overs)		190 (51 overs); Jermaine Blackwood 69 (81); Damion Jacobs 5/42 (14 overs)
142 (41.2 overs); Rahkeem Cornwall 44* (62); Jerome Taylor 4/31 (14.2 overs)		157/9 (46.5 overs); Assad Fudadin 36 (92); Damion Jacobs 6/62 (21 overs)

Jamaica won by 1 wicket
Warner Park, Basseterre
Umpires: Joel Wilson and Carl Tuckett
Player of the match: Jerome Taylor (Jamaica) and Damion Jacobs (Leeward Islands)

- Jamaica won the toss and elected to field.

=== Round 7 ===
7–10 February 2019
Scorecard

Jamaica	v	Guyana
358 (97.2 overs); Derval Green 86 (80); Sherfane Rutherford 3/52 (10 overs)		321 (113.2 overs); Vishaul Singh 61 (167); Jerome Taylor 3/27 (14.2 overs)
132 (48.1 overs); Assad Fudadin 24 (84); Gudakesh Motie 3/11 (5.1 overs)		171/3 (43 overs); Leon Johnson 61* (86); Kenroy Williams 1/20 (11 overs)

Guyana won by 7 wickets
Providence Stadium, Guyana
Umpires: Joel Wilson and Jonathan Blades
Player of the match: Leon Johnson (Guyana)

- Guyana won the toss and elected to field.

7–10 February 2019
Scorecard

Trinidad and Tobago	v	Barbados
358 (97 overs); Lendl Simmons 138 (152); Marquino Mindley 5/78 (20 overs)		282 (96.5 overs); Ashley Nurse 75 (90); Yannic Cariah 5/59 (22 overs)
247/6d (64.4 overs); Denesh Ramdin 86 (109); Ashley Nurse 3/62 (14.4 overs)		326/6 (81.2 overs); Jonathan Carter 149* (185); Daniel St Clair 2/59 (13 overs)

Barbados won by 4 wickets
Kensington Oval, Bridgetown
Umpires: Leslie Reifer and Verdayne Smith
Player of the match: Jonathan Carter (Barbados)

- Trinidad and Tobago won the toss and elected to bat.

7–10 February 2019
Scorecard

Leeward Islands	v	Windward Islands
271 (99.5 overs); Montcin Hodge 61 (145); Ray Jordan 4/47 (17.5 overs)		230 (87.4 overs); Alick Athanaze 53 (108); Sheeno Berridge 4/42 (13 overs)
199 (80.3 overs); Devon Thomas 43 (95); Kavem Hodge 4/51 (33.3 overs)		228 (63.4 overs); Sunil Ambris 102* (138); Rahkeem Cornwall 5/79 (27 overs)

Leeward Islands won by 12 runs
Arnos Vale Ground, Kingstown
Umpires: Nigel Duguid and Patrick Gustard
Player of the match: Rahkeem Cornwall (Leeward Islands)

- Windward Islands won the toss and elected to field.

=== Round 8 ===
21–24 February 2019
Scorecard

Barbados	v	Windward Islands
215 (62.2 overs); Tevyn Walcott 66 (144); Larry Edwards 3/29 (12.2 overs)		138 (57.4 overs); Kimani Melius 50 (142); Jomel Warrican 8/45 (25.4 overs)
192 (89 overs); Shayne Moseley 53 (104); Ray Jordan 3/21 (14 overs)		246 (96.2 overs); Kavem Hodge 66 (165); Miguel Cummins 4/53 (17 overs)

Barbados won by 23 runs
Arnos Vale Ground, Kingstown
Umpires: Christopher Taylor and Deighton Butler
Player of the match: Jomel Warrican (Barbados)

- Barbados won the toss and elected to bat.
- Kimani Melius (Windward Islands) made his first-class debut.

21–24 February 2019
Scorecard

Leeward Islands	v	Trinidad and Tobago
365 (124 overs); Terrence Warde 83 (244); Khary Pierre 4/110 (44 overs)		329 (96.1 overs); Imran Khan 86 (190); Rahkeem Cornwall 3/86 (24.1 overs)
315/6d (74.1 overs); Devon Thomas 94 (111); Anderson Phillip 2/55 (15.1 overs)		236/4 (50 overs); Joshua Da Silva 75 (125); Rahkeem Cornwall 2/67 (14 overs)

Match drawn
Warner Park, Basseterre
Umpires: Jonathan Blades and Jacqueline Williams
Player of the match: Devon Thomas (Leeward Islands)

- Trinidad and Tobago won the toss and elected to field.

21–24 February 2019
Scorecard

Guyana	v	Jamaica
158 (55.4 overs); Anthony Bramble 36 (49); Akim Frazer 4/69 (23 overs)		139 (35.4 overs); Assad Fudadin 43 (76); Clinton Pestano 4/31 (10.4 overs)
138 (40 overs); Anthony Bramble 34 (46); Jerome Taylor 4/26 (13 overs)		158/2 (31.2 overs); Jermaine Blackwood 72* (87); Clinton Pestano 1/22 (5 overs)

Jamaica won by 8 wickets
Sabina Park, Kingston
Umpires: Patrick Gustard and Zahid Bassarath
Player of the match: Akim Frazer (Jamaica)

- Jamaica won the toss and elected to field.
- Akim Frazer (Jamaica) made his first-class debut.

=== Round 9 ===
28 February–3 March 2019
Scorecard

Leeward Islands	v	Jamaica
210 (66 overs); Devon Thomas 65 (89); Nikita Miller 7/50 (25 overs)		250 (67.2 overs); Brandon King 95 (132); Rahkeem Cornwall 6/57 (23.2 overs)
312 (95.1 overs); Keacy Carty 68 (173); Nikita Miller 4/95 (44.1 overs)		138 (37.3 overs); Brandon King 31 (34); Sheeno Berridge 4/40 (12 overs)

Leeward Islands won by 134 runs
Sabina Park, Kingston
Umpires: Chris Wright and Deighton Butler
Player of the match: Rahkeem Cornwall (Leeward Islands)

- Jamaica won the toss and elected to field.
- Kennar Lewis, Gordon Bryan, Alwyn Williams (Jamaica) and Kian Pemberton (Leeward Islands) all made their first-class debuts.

28 February–3 March 2019
Scorecard

Barbados	v	Guyana
76 (29.1 overs); Chaim Holder 22 (18); Raymon Reifer 5/20 (10 overs)		201 (77 overs); Raymon Reifer 52* (127); Jonathan Carter 4/52 (22 overs)
238 (75.5 overs); Shayne Moseley 64 (121); Raymon Reifer 4/22 (11.5 overs)		118/3 (29 overs); Chandrapaul Hemraj 51 (63); Shamar Springer 3/29 (10 overs)

Guyana won by 7 wickets
Providence Stadium, Guyana
Umpires: Patrick Gustard and Danesh Ramdhanie
Player of the match: Raymon Reifer (Guyana)

- Barbados won the toss and elected to bat.

28 February–3 March 2019
Scorecard

Trinidad and Tobago	v	Windward Islands
307 (101.3 overs); Khary Pierre 106* (219); Shermon Lewis 7/76 (21.3 overs)		200 (74.5 overs); Roland Cato 46 (121); Imran Khan 5/54 (23.5 overs)
244/8d (86 overs); Denesh Ramdin 57* (148); Kavem Hodge 6/68 (32 overs)		161 (59.2 overs); Denis Smith 42 (58); Imran Khan 5/65 (20 overs)

Trinidad and Tobago won by 190 runs
Windsor Park, Roseau
Umpires: Mark Hawthorne and Carl Tuckett
Player of the match: Khary Pierre (Trinidad and Tobago)

- Trinidad and Tobago won the toss and elected to bat.

=== Round 10 ===
7–10 March 2019
Scorecard

Jamaica	v	Barbados
250 (87.5 overs); Nkrumah Bonner 97 (202); Marquino Mindley 3/36 (15 overs)		311/9d (104.4 overs); Jonathan Carter 91 (176); Nikita Miller 3/63 (31 overs)
218 (59.4 overs); Brandon King 46 (45); Roston Chase 5/63 (21.4 overs)		161/8 (60 overs); Shamarh Brooks 71 (146); Akim Frazer 3/55 (17 overs)

Barbados won by 2 wickets
Sabina Park, Kingston
Umpires: Verdayne Smith and Deighton Butler
Player of the match: Roston Chase (Barbados)

- Barbados won the toss and elected to field.
- Nikita Miller (Jamaica) played in his 100th first-class match.

7–10 March 2019
Scorecard

Windward Islands	v	Leeward Islands
200 (47.2 overs); Sunil Ambris 92 (105); Sheeno Berridge 4/34 (12 overs)		261 (92.4 overs); Devon Thomas 69 (123); Ray Jordan 3/40 (14 overs)
226 (70.5 overs); Audley Alexander 50* (72); Alzarri Joseph 5/66 (20 overs)		168/4 (39.3 overs); Devon Thomas 117* (105); Shermon Lewis 3/19 (8 overs)

Leeward Islands won by 6 wickets
Sir Vivian Richards Stadium, Antigua
Umpires: Christopher Taylor and Mark Hawthorne
Player of the match: Devon Thomas (Leeward Islands)

- Leeward Islands won the toss and elected to bat.
- Emmanuel Stewart (Windward Islands) made his first-class debut.

7–10 March 2019
Scorecard

Trinidad and Tobago	v	Guyana
120 (32.1 overs); Imran Khan 37 (43); Romario Shepherd 5/24 (9.1 overs)		165 (41.1 overs); Anthony Bramble 62 (76); Daniel St Clair 3/29 (8 overs)
206 (75.2 overs); Khary Pierre 30 (89); Romario Shepherd 3/52 (17 overs)		163/4 (53.4 overs); Leon Johnson 76 (125); Daniel St Clair 1/21 (5 overs)

Guyana won by 6 wickets
Providence Stadium, Guyana
Umpires: Patrick Gustard and Jacqueline Williams
Player of the match: Romario Shepherd (Guyana)

- Trinidad and Tobago won the toss and elected to bat.

=== Round 11 ===
14–17 March 2019
Scorecard

Leeward Islands	v	Barbados
90 (38 overs); Montcin Hodge 24 (61); Keon Harding 5/29 (10 overs)		191/8d (54.5 overs); Shamarh Brooks 82 (155); Alzarri Joseph 4/28 (12.5 overs)
83/2d (19.5 overs); Montcin Hodge 40* (65); Marquino Mindley 1/15 (5 overs)

Barbados won by an innings and 18 runs
Sir Vivian Richards Stadium, Antigua
Umpires: Nigel Duguid and Verdayne Smith
Player of the match: Keon Harding (Barbados)

- Barbados won the toss and elected to field.

14–17 March 2019
Scorecard

Trinidad and Tobago	v	Jamaica
389 (100.5 overs); Jason Mohammed 94 (158); Nicholson Gordon 7/70 (22 overs)		347 (93.4 overs); Jermaine Blackwood 66 (90); Anderson Phillip 5/74 (14.4 overs)
295 (68.4 overs); Jason Mohammed 110 (156); Jermaine Blackwood 3/39 (12 overs)		252 (61 overs); Brandon King 133 (119); Imran Khan 3/48 (13 overs)

Trinidad and Tobago won by 85 runs
Brian Lara Stadium, Trinidad
Umpires: Zahid Bassarath and Gregory Brathwaite
Player of the match: Jason Mohammed (Trinidad and Tobago)

- Trinidad and Tobago won the toss and elected to bat.
