= 2017–18 Regional Four Day Competition =

Cricket tournament

- Dates: 26 October 2017 – 21 January 2018
- Administrator: WICB
- Cricket format: First-class (four-day)
- Tournament format: Double round-robin
- Champions: Guyana (10th title)
- Participants: 6
- Matches: 30
- Most runs: Devon Smith (1,095)
- Most wickets: Veerasammy Permaul (50)

The 2017–18 Regional Four Day Competition was the 52nd edition of the Regional Four Day Competition, the domestic first-class cricket competition for the countries of the West Indies Cricket Board (WICB). The competition ran from 26 October 2017 to 21 January 2018, with six matches being played as day/night fixtures.

Six teams contested the tournament – Barbados, Guyana, Jamaica, the Leeward Islands, Trinidad and Tobago, and the Windward Islands. Guyana were the defending champions and retained their title, finishing ahead of Barbados.

In December 2017, the round 6 fixture between Guyana and the Windward Islands finished as a tie. This was the 63rd tied game in more than 300 years of first-class cricket, and the first occurrence of a tied match in first-class cricket in the West Indies.

== Points table ==
Team	Pld	W	L	D	T	Pts
Guyana	10	7	0	2	1	166.8
Barbados	10	3	2	5	0	114.4
Leeward Islands	10	2	4	4	0	94.8
Jamaica	10	3	4	3	0	93.6
Windward Islands	10	2	4	3	1	85.6
Trinidad and Tobago	10	2	5	3	0	82.4

Champions

== Fixtures ==
=== Round 1 ===
26–29 October 2017
Scorecard

Guyana	v	Jamaica
266 (96 overs); Anthony Bramble 62 (122); Derval Green 4/63 (21 overs)		99 (50.5 overs); Assad Fudadin 39 (99); Veerasammy Permaul 6/29 (19.5 overs)
315/8d (87 overs); Keemo Paul 107 (129); Dennis Bulli 5/104 (22 overs)		219 (98.4 overs); Romaine Morrison 68 (107); Veerasammy Permaul 4/55 (35.4 overs)

Guyana won by 263 runs
Providence Stadium, Guyana
Umpires: Nigel Duguid and Danesh Ramdhanie
Player of the match: Veerasammy Permaul (Guyana)

- Jamaica won the toss and elected to field.
- Damani Sewell, Garth Garvey and Romaine Morrison (Jamaica) all made their first-class debuts.
- Keemo Paul (Guyana) scored his maiden century in first-class cricket.
- Dennis Bulli (Jamaica) took his maiden five-wicket haul in first-class cricket.

26–29 October 2017
Scorecard

Trinidad and Tobago	v	Barbados
300 (81.1 overs); Denesh Ramdin 101 (160); Jomel Warrican 4/67 (27.1 overs)		310/9d (104 overs); Jonathan Carter 85 (180); Imran Khan 3/68 (33 overs)
257/5d (74 overs); Amir Jangoo 63 (97); Ashley Nurse 2/55 (14 overs)		117/4 (28 overs); Aaron Jones 52* (82); Roshon Primus 2/9 (1 over)

Match drawn
Kensington Oval, Bridgetown
Umpires: Leslie Reifer and Jacqueline Williams
Player of the match: Denesh Ramdin (Trinidad and Tobago)

- Barbados won the toss and elected to field.
- Only four balls were bowled on day 1.
- Shayne Moseley, Aaron Jones and Shakeem Clarke (Barbados) all made their first-class debuts.

26–29 October 2017
Scorecard

Windward Islands	v	Leeward Islands
232 (93.2 overs); Roland Cato 90 (154); Jeremiah Louis 4/35 (18.2 overs)		343 (125.3 overs); Chesney Hughes 89 (176); Shermon Lewis 3/51 (24 overs)
331/3d (78 overs); Devon Smith 185* (240); Jacques Taylor 1/34 (9 overs)		112/6 (43 overs); Keacy Carty 48 (83); Liam Sebastien 2/12 (9 overs)

Match drawn
National Cricket Stadium, Grenada
Umpires: Jonathan Blades and Joel Wilson
Player of the match: Devon Smith (Windward Islands)

- Windward Islands won the toss and elected to bat.
- Jervin Benjamin (Windward Islands) and Terrence Warde (Leeward Islands) both made their first-class debuts.

=== Round 2 ===
1–5 November 2017
Scorecard

Barbados	v	Leeward Islands
113 (36.2 overs); Ashley Nurse 45 (41); Jeremiah Louis 6/69 (14.2 overs)		233 (84.1 overs); Jeremiah Louis 62* (109); Kenroy Williams 5/50 (20 overs)
116 (32.3 overs); Ashley Nurse 67 (71); Gavin Tonge 6/21 (12 overs)

Leeward Islands won by an innings and 4 runs
Kensington Oval, Bridgetown
Umpires: Gregory Brathwaite and Danesh Ramdhanie
Player of the match: Jeremiah Louis (Leeward Islands)

- Leeward Islands won the toss and elected to field.
- This was the first time since 2009 that the Leeward Islands had beaten Barbados in the Regional Four Day tournament.
- Jeremiah Louis (Leeward Islands) took his maiden five-wicket haul in first-class cricket.

2–5 November 2017
Scorecard

Jamaica	v	Trinidad and Tobago
431 (140.3 overs); Fabian Allen 169* (283); Bryan Charles 3/64 (25.3 overs)		380/7d (118 overs); Tion Webster 178 (316); Derval Green 3/77 (27 overs)
141 (83 overs); Paul Palmer 52 (184); Imran Khan 6/59 (37 overs)		84/3 (19 overs); Denesh Ramdin 31* (42); Derval Green 2/55 (9 overs)

Match drawn
Queen's Park Oval, Port of Spain
Umpires: Deighton Butler and Joel Wilson
Player of the match: Fabian Allen (Jamaica)

- Trinidad & Tobago won the toss and elected to field.
- Paul Harrison (Jamaica) made his first-class debut.
- Fabian Allen (Jamaica) scored his maiden century in first-class cricket.
- Tion Webster (Trinidad and Tobago) scored his maiden century in first-class cricket.

2–5 November 2017
Scorecard

Windward Islands	v	Guyana
151 (50.5 overs); Kavem Hodge 48 (61); Sherfane Rutherford 6/32 (10.5 overs)		357 (104 overs); Vishaul Singh 119 (252); Obed McCoy 3/56 (15 overs)
244 (65.3 overs); Kirk Edwards 54 (80); Veerasammy Permaul 4/53 (20.3 overs)		41/3 (14.5 overs); Tagenarine Chanderpaul 11* (44); Ray Jordan 2/23 (7 overs)

Guyana won by 7 wickets
Daren Sammy Cricket Ground, Gros Islet
Umpires: Zahid Bassarath and Carl Tuckett
Player of the match: Sherfane Rutherford (Guyana)

- Guyana won the toss and elected to field.
- Ray Jordan and Obed McCoy (Windward Islands) both made their first-class debuts.

=== Round 3 ===
9–12 November 2017
Scorecard

Jamaica	v	Barbados
176/8d (57.2 overs); John Campbell 44 (68); Kevin Stoute 4/58 (24 overs)		304/7d (93.4 overs); Jonathan Carter 130 (186); Derval Green 2/59 (15 overs)
98/6 (48 overs); Paul Palmer 32* (115); Jomel Warrican 3/22 (16 overs)

Match drawn
Sabina Park, Kingston
Umpires: Nigel Duguid and Chris Wright
Player of the match: Kevin Stoute (Barbados)

- Jamaica won the toss and elected to bat.
- Steven Taylor (Jamaica) made his first-class debut.

9–12 November 2017
Scorecard

Leeward Islands	v	Guyana
412/9d (160.5 overs); Montcin Hodge 91 (333); Sherfane Rutherford 3/92 (26 overs)		206 (63.4 overs); Vishaul Singh 97* (182); Terrence Warde 4/48 (10 overs)
		305/7 (116) (f/o); Shivnarine Chanderpaul 109 (147); Terrence Warde 2/43 (21 overs)

Match drawn
Sir Vivian Richards Stadium, Antigua
Umpires: Christopher Taylor and Carl Tuckett
Player of the match: Terrence Warde (Leeward Islands)

- Guyana won the toss and elected to field.
- Stanny Simon (Leeward Islands) made his first-class debut.

9–12 November 2017
Scorecard

Trinidad and Tobago	v	Windward Islands
402 (108 overs); Denesh Ramdin 116 (170); Shermon Lewis 5/64 (20 overs)		166 (53 overs); Kavem Hodge 46 (72); Imran Khan 3/46 (15 overs)
24/0 (4.3 overs); Kyle Hope 17* (23)		259 (83.2 overs) (f/o); Devon Smith 119* (240); Daniel St Clair 4/29 (13 overs)

Trinidad and Tobago won by 10 wickets
Queen's Park Oval, Port of Spain
Umpires: Gregory Brathwaite and Danesh Ramdhanie
Player of the match: Daniel St Clair (Trinidad and Tobago)

- Windward Islands won the toss and elected to field.
- Shermon Lewis (Windward Islands) took his maiden five-wicket haul in first-class cricket.

=== Round 4 ===
16–19 November 2017
Scorecard

Jamaica	v	Leeward Islands
342 (102.3 overs); Paul Palmer 86 (206); Rahkeem Cornwall 4/86 (29.3 overs)		232 (87.4 overs); Montcin Hodge 50 (115); Nikita Miller 5/56 (28.4 overs)
191 (73.3 overs); Derval Green 51 (48); Rahkeem Cornwall 4/32 (29 overs)		144 (49.4 overs); Terrence Warde 30 (87); Nikita Miller 5/31 (20 overs)

Jamaica won by 157 runs
Warner Park, Basseterre
Umpires: Leslie Reifer and Carl Tuckett
Player of the match: Nikita Miller (Jamaica)

- Jamaica won the toss and elected to bat.
- Sheeno Berridge (Leeward Islands) made his first-class debut.

16–19 November 2017
Scorecard

Guyana	v	Trinidad and Tobago
484/8d (159 overs); Leon Johnson 165 (360); Bryan Charles 5/134 (43 overs)		120 (63.4 overs); Amir Jangoo 39 (72); Veerasammy Permaul 4/43 (26.4 overs)
		147 (75.1 overs) (f/o); Imran Khan 28 (130); Veerasammy Permaul 5/54 (32.1 overs)

Guyana won by an innings and 217 runs
Queen's Park Oval, Port of Spain
Umpires: Zahid Bassarath and Jonathan Blades
Player of the match: Leon Johnson (Guyana)

- Guyana won the toss and elected to bat.

16–19 November 2017
Scorecard

Barbados	v	Windward Islands
360 (131.2 overs); Kevin Stoute 84 (211); Tyrone Theophile 5/56 (23 overs)		222 (80.5 overs); Roland Cato 64 (151); Kenroy Williams 3/21 (6.5 overs)
171 (61 overs); Mario Rampersaud 36* (84); Shane Shillingford 5/74 (30 overs)		174 (64.4 overs); Kyle Mayers 76 (119); Kenroy Williams 4/36 (15.4 overs)

Barbados won by 135 runs
Arnos Vale Stadium, Kingstown
Umpires: Deighton Butler and Verdayne Smith
Player of the match: Kenroy Williams (Barbados)

- Windward Islands won the toss and elected to field.

=== Round 5 ===
30 November–3 December 2017
Scorecard

Windward Islands	v	Jamaica
200 (83 overs); Devon Smith 116 (254); Nikita Miller 5/60 (29 overs)		352 (126 overs); Fabian Allen 105* (203); Shane Shillingford 7/94 (44 overs)
186 (80.5 overs); Devon Smith 41 (72); Nikita Miller 8/54 (32.5 overs)		35/0 (5.4 overs); Trevon Griffith 24* (20)

Jamaica won by 10 wickets
Sabina Park, Kingston
Umpires: Gregory Brathwaite and Christopher Taylor
Player of the match: Nikita Miller (Jamaica)

- Windward Islands won the toss and elected to bat.
- Kenneth Dember (Windward Islands) made his first-class debut.

30 November–3 December 2017
Scorecard

Leeward Islands	v	Trinidad and Tobago
207 (53 overs); Devon Thomas 46 (82); Roshon Primus 4/57 (12 overs)		360 (101 overs); Amir Jangoo 96 (134); Terrence Warde 3/61 (18 overs)
137 (67.4 overs); Montcin Hodge 54 (194); Khary Pierre 5/44 (26.4 overs)

Trinidad and Tobago won by an innings and 16 runs
Sir Vivian Richards Stadium, Antigua
Umpires: Jonathan Blades and Leslie Reifer
Player of the match: Imran Khan (Trinidad and Tobago)

- Leeward Islands won the toss and elected to bat.

30 November–3 December 2017
Scorecard

Barbados	v	Guyana
294 (97.3 overs); Justin Greaves 72 (157); Keemo Paul 5/59 (16.3 overs)		314 (105.4 overs); Chandrapaul Hemraj 79 (117); Ashley Nurse 3/33 (8.4 overs)
197 (56.5 overs); Jonathan Carter 53 (75); Keon Joseph 4/38 (12.5 overs)		181/2 (55.3 overs); Tagenarine Chanderpaul 62* (166); Ashley Nurse 1/32 (13 overs)

Guyana won by 8 wickets
Providence Stadium, Guyana
Umpires: Zahid Bassarath and Verdayne Smith
Player of the match: Keemo Paul (Guyana)

- Barbados won the toss and elected to bat.

=== Round 6 ===
7–10 December 2017
Scorecard

Trinidad and Tobago	v	Jamaica
243 (82.5 overs); Jeremy Solozano 62 (148); John Campbell 4/40 (17.5 overs)		535 (126 overs); John Campbell 156 (185); Daniel St Clair 4/67 (19 overs)
163/6 (75 overs); Denesh Ramdin 52 (167); Reynard Leveridge 3/23 (11 overs)

Match drawn
Sabina Park, Kingston
Umpires: Gregory Brathwaite and Jacqueline Williams
Player of the match: John Campbell (Jamaica)

- Trinidad and Tobago won the toss and elected to bat.
- Odean Smith (Jamaica) made his first-class debut.

7–10 December 2017
Scorecard

Barbados	v	Leeward Islands
394 (144.4 overs); Shayne Moseley 117 (303); Rahkeem Cornwall 5/116 (51.4 overs)		246 (83.3 overs); Montcin Hodge 82 (190); Hayden Walsh 6/48 (20 overs)
163/4d (48 overs); Kenroy Williams 49* (73); Gavin Tonge 1/24 (10 overs)		286/8 (77 overs); Devon Thomas 103 (154); Jomel Warrican 6/89 (28 overs)

Match drawn
Warner Park, Basseterre
Umpires: Patrick Gustard and Carl Tuckett
Player of the match: Hayden Walsh (Barbados)

- Leeward Islands won the toss and elected to field.

7–10 December 2017
Scorecard

Windward Islands	v	Guyana
117 (54.3 overs); Tyrone Theophile 33 (88); Veerasammy Permaul 5/40 (21.3 overs)		194 (71.4 overs); Shivnarine Chanderpaul 59 (120); Shane Shillingford 4/36 (18 overs)
241 (84.2 overs); Devon Smith 95 (185); Sherfane Rutherford 2/19 (6 overs)		164 (47.2 overs); Vishaul Singh 56 (95); Shane Shillingford 5/47 (16.2 overs)

Match tied
Providence Stadium, Guyana
Umpires: Shannon Crawford and Christopher Taylor

- Guyana won the toss and elected to field.

=== Round 7 ===
14–17 December 2017
Scorecard

Guyana	v	Leeward Islands
417 (124.5 overs); Anthony Bramble 196* (292); Rahkeem Cornwall 3/117 (30 overs)		149 (49.3 overs); Devon Thomas 20 (16); Veerasammy Permaul 6/32 (17 overs)
4/0 (0.4 overs); Tagenarine Chanderpaul 4* (4)		268 (87.3 overs) (f/o); Akeem Saunders 101 (173); Keemo Paul 3/38 (12.3 overs)

Guyana won by 10 wickets
Providence Stadium, Guyana
Umpires: Shannon Crawford and Patrick Gustard
Player of the match: Anthony Bramble (Guyana)

- Guyana won the toss and elected to bat.
- Anthony Bramble (Guyana) and Akeem Saunders (Leeward Islands) both scored their maiden centuries in first-class cricket.
- Veerasammy Permaul (Guyana) took his 25th five-wicket haul in first-class cricket.

14–17 December 2017
Scorecard

Barbados	v	Trinidad and Tobago
316 (114.2 overs); Shamarh Brooks 96 (200); Imran Khan 4/81 (41.2 overs)		214 (104.4 overs); Denesh Ramdin 132* (294); Jomel Warrican 6/71 (39 overs)
221/7d (68 overs); Shamar Springer 51* (87); Imran Khan 3/88 (25 overs)		116 (54.5 overs); Denesh Ramdin 24 (68); Jomel Warrican 3/13 (12 overs)

Barbados won by 207 runs
Queen's Park Oval, Port of Spain
Umpires: Zahid Bassarath and Verdayne Smith
Player of the match: Jomel Warrican (Barbados)

- Barbados won the toss and elected to bat.
- Shamar Springer (Barbados) made his first-class debut.

14–17 December 2017
Scorecard

Windward Islands	v	Jamaica
226/9d (84 overs); Devon Smith 107* (247); Christopher Lamont 4/52 (30 overs)		112/9d (35.3 overs); John Campbell 29 (31); Kyle Mayers 4/32 (12 overs)
283 (96.5 overs); Devon Smith 154 (280); Damion Jacobs 4/51 (22.5 overs)		279 (64.2 overs); Brandon King 88 (108); Kyle Mayers 5/92 (23 overs)

Windward Islands won by 118 runs
Windsor Park, Roseau
Umpires: Deighton Butler and Leslie Reifer
Player of the match: Devon Smith (Windward Islands)

- Jamaica won the toss and elected to field.
- Christopher Lamont (Jamaica) made his first-class debut.

=== Round 8 ===
4–7 January 2018
Scorecard

Trinidad and Tobago	v	Leeward Islands
222 (75.4 overs); Tion Webster 38 (70); Jeremiah Louis 4/45 (12.4 overs)		163 (51 overs); Akeem Saunders 49 (57); Imran Khan 5/25 (15 overs)
162 (58.4 overs); Amir Jangoo 38 (30); Sheeno Berridge 4/40 (14.4 overs)		226/9 (70.3 overs); Devon Thomas 65 (99); Imran Khan 5/87 (24.3 overs)

Leeward Islands won by 1 wicket
Queen's Park Oval, Port of Spain
Umpires: Zahid Bassarath and Carl Tuckett
Player of the match: Sheeno Berridge (Leeward Islands)

- Trinidad and Tobago won the toss and elected to bat.
- Chaim Holder (Leeward Islands) made his first-class debut.

4–7 January 2018
Scorecard

Jamaica	v	Guyana
106 (36.2 overs); Aldane Thomas 24 (37); Keemo Paul 3/15 (8.2 overs)		183 (59.5 overs); Shivnarine Chanderpaul 50 (129); Nikita Miller 4/30 (14.5 overs)
212 (80.5 overs); Assad Fudadin 70 (192); Gudakesh Motie 4/39 (26 overs)		136/8 (58.3 overs); Chandrapaul Hemraj 40 (53); Nikita Miller 4/64 (19 overs)

Guyana won by 2 wickets
Sabina Park, Kingston
Umpires: Jonathan Blades and Jacqueline Williams
Player of the match: Keemo Paul (Guyana)

- Guyana won the toss and elected to field.
- Akshaya Persaud (Guyana) made his first-class debut.

4–7 January 2018
Scorecard

Barbados	v	Windward Islands
316 (96.1 overs); Roston Chase 114 (225); Larry Edwards 3/71 (20 overs)		287 (94.4 overs); Kavem Hodge 63 (137); Kemar Roach 4/75 (22 overs)
135/1 (64 overs); Shamarh Brooks 69* (150); Delorn Johnson 1/11 (11 overs)

Match drawn
Kensington Oval, Bridgetown
Umpires: Leslie Reifer and Christopher Taylor
Player of the match: Roston Chase (Barbados)

- Windward Islands won the toss and elected to field.
- Tevyn Walcott (Barbados) made his first-class debut.

=== Round 9 ===
11–14 January 2018
Scorecard

Jamaica	v	Leeward Islands
197 (59.1 overs); Jermaine Blackwood 81 (98); Sheeno Berridge 4/46 (13 overs)		171 (78.3 overs); Keacy Carty 78 (211); Damion Jacobs 7/74 (27.3 overs)
235 (59.1 overs); Jermaine Blackwood 70 (97); Sheeno Berridge 5/59 (14.1 overs)		204 (80.3 overs); Devon Thomas 52 (109); Damion Jacobs 5/83 (29.3 overs)

Jamaica won by 57 runs
Sabina Park, Kingston
Umpires: Danesh Ramdhanie and Verdayne Smith
Player of the match: Damion Jacobs (Jamaica)

- Leeward Islands won the toss and elected to field.

11–14 January 2018
Scorecard

Guyana	v	Barbados
297 (101.5 overs); Chandrapaul Hemraj 90 (145); Chemar Holder 5/57 (17.5 overs)		199 (58.5 overs); Kemar Roach 51 (69); Romario Shepherd 5/40 (14 overs)
263/5d (89.2 overs); Tagenarine Chanderpaul 101* (275); Chemar Holder 3/72 (23 overs)		208/4 (58 overs); Kraigg Brathwaite 54 (122); Keemo Paul 2/76 (16 overs)

Match drawn
Kensington Oval, Bridgetown
Umpires: Jonathan Blades and Patrick Gustard
Player of the match: Chemar Holder (Barbados)

- Barbados won the toss and elected to field.
- Chemar Holder (Barbados) made his first-class debut.

11–14 January 2018
Scorecard

Windward Islands	v	Trinidad and Tobago
366 (131.4 overs); Kavem Hodge 128 (346); Daniel St Clair 6/62 (20.4 overs)		172 (85.1 overs); Denesh Ramdin 75 (182); Shane Shillingford 3/36 (23.1 overs)
		157 (82.4 overs) (f/o); Amir Jangoo 69 (199); Sherman Lewis 3/20 (10.4 overs)

Windward Islands won by an innings and 37 runs
Windsor Park, Roseau
Umpires: Mike Burns and Deighton Butler
Player of the match: Kavem Hodge (Windward Islands)

- Trinidad and Tobago won the toss and elected to field.

=== Round 10 ===
18–21 January 2018
Scorecard

Barbados	v	Jamaica
427 (158.2 overs); Shamarh Brooks 166 (356); Derval Green 2/50 (24 overs)		247 (56.3 overs); Chadwick Walton 72 (82); Jomel Warrican 3/34 (15.3 overs)
169/0d (46.1 overs); Shayne Moseley 100* (173)		133 (25.5 overs); John Campbell 28 (40); Keon Harding 5/66 (10.5 overs)

Barbados won by 216 runs
Kensington Oval, Bridgetown
Umpires: Mike Burns and Leslie Reifer
Player of the match: Shamarh Brooks (Barbados)

- Barbados won the toss and elected to bat.
- Dominic Drakes (Barbados) made his first-class debut.

18–21 January 2018
Scorecard

Trinidad and Tobago	v	Guyana
135 (44.3 overs); Denesh Ramdin 50 (114); Raymon Reifer 5/40 (11 overs)		540/9d (152 overs); Raymon Reifer 108* (217); Yannic Cariah 3/91 (14 overs)
324 (88.5 overs); Jason Mohammed 103* (200); Veerasammy Permaul 3/73 (29 overs)

Guyana won by an innings and 81 runs
Providence Stadium, Guyana
Umpires: Deighton Butler and Shannon Crawford
Player of the match: Raymon Reifer (Guyana)

- Trinidad and Tobago won the toss and elected to bat.

18–21 January 2018
Scorecard

Windward Islands	v	Leeward Islands
197 (56.4 overs); Delorn Johnson 48 (53); Terrence Warde 2/20 (4 overs)		405/9d (124.4 overs); Devon Thomas 172 (247); Kyle Mayers 3/64 (17.4 overs)
342/1 (96.1 overs); Tyrone Theophile 160* (283); Rahkeem Cornwall 1/64 (25.1 overs)

Match drawn
Warner Park, Basseterre
Umpires: Verdayne Smith and Joel Wilson
Player of the match: Devon Thomas (Leeward Islands)

- Windward Islands won the toss and elected to bat.
