= 2018–19 Regional Super50 =

Cricket tournament

- Dates: 3 – 28 October 2018
- Administrator: CWI
- Cricket format: List A (50 overs)
- Tournament format(s): Group stage, finals
- Champions: (Cricket West Indies) Combined Campuses (1st title)
- Participants: 10
- Matches: 39
- Most runs: Jonathan Carter (351)
- Most wickets: Yannick Ottley (17); Romesh Eranga (17)

The 2018–19 Regional Super50 was the 45th edition of the Regional Super50, the domestic limited-overs cricket competition for the countries of the Cricket West Indies (CWI). The tournament started on 3 October 2018. The players' draft for the tournament took place in May 2018. The Windward Islands were the defending champions.

In August 2018, both the United States national cricket team and the Canada national cricket team were invited to compete. Their participation was confirmed the following month. They were joined by the six regular teams of West Indian domestic cricket (Barbados, Guyana, Jamaica, the Leeward Islands, Trinidad and Tobago, and the Windward Islands), the Combined Campuses and Colleges team and the West Indies B cricket team.

On 6 October 2018, Chris Gayle played in his final List A cricket match for Jamaica, scoring a century, with Jamaica beating Barbados by 33 runs.

Following the conclusion of the group stage, Guyana and Trinidad and Tobago from Group A along with Combined Campuses and Colleges and Jamaica from Group B had all progressed to the knockout stage of the competition.

In the first semi-final, Guyana beat Jamaica by one wicket, with Guyana's captain, Leon Johnson, scoring his first century in List A cricket. In the second semi-final, Combined Campuses and Colleges beat Trinidad and Tobago by seven wickets, with Akeem Jordan taking a five-wicket haul.

In the final, Combined Campuses and Colleges beat Guyana by six wickets to win their first Regional Super50 title.

== Squads ==
Prior to the start of the tournament, players were selected in the Professional Cricket League draft: In September 2018, Cricket West Indies (CWI) confirmed the final squads for the tournament. Cricket Canada announced their squad on 1 October 2018. The squad for the United States was named two days later.

Barbados	Canada	(Cricket West Indies) Combined Campuses	Guyana	Jamaica
Sulieman Benn; Leniko Boucher; Shamarh Brooks; Jonathan Carter; Miguel Cummins; Dominic Drakes; Justin Greaves; Keon Harding; Marquino Mindley; Shayne Moseley; Ashley Nurse; Shamar Springer; Kevin Stoute; Tevyn Walcott	Bhavindu Adhihetty; Sukhdeep Brar; Navneet Dhaliwal; Nikhil Dutta; Romesh Eranga; Dillon Heyliger; Davy Jacobs; Nitish Kumar; Salman Nazar; Cecil Pervez; Varun Sehdev; Harsh Thaker; Rodrigo Thomas; Srimantha Wijeratne	Carlos Brathwaite; Linton Buchanan; Kyle Corbin; Keron Cottoy; Jonathan Drakes; Jon-Russ Jaggesar; Amir Jangoo; Akeem Jordan; Nicholas Kirton; Jermaine Levy; Khesan Ottley; Kjorn Ottley; Ojay Shields; Nicholas Sookdeosingh	Ricardo Adams; Christopher Barnwell; Anthony Bramble; Tagenarine Chanderpaul; Trevon Griffith; Chandrapaul Hemraj; Leon Johnson; Ramaal Lewis; Gudakesh Motie; Veerasammy Permaul; Clinton Pestano; Raymon Reifer; Sherfane Rutherford; Romario Shepherd	Fabian Allen; Jermaine Blackwood; Nkrumah Bonner; Gordon Bryan; Chris Gayle; Brandon King; Christopher Lamont; Andre McCarthy; Nikita Miller; Paul Palmer; Rovman Powell; Jerome Taylor; Oshane Thomas; Chadwick Walton
Leeward Islands	Trinidad and Tobago	United States	(Cricket West Indies) West Indies B	Windward Islands
Sheno Berridge; Nelson Bolan; Keacy Carty; Rahkeem Cornwall; Sheldon Cottrell; Montcin Hodge; Chesney Hughes; Damion Jacobs; Jeremiah Louis; Jaison Peters; Orlando Peters; Akeem Saunders; Devon Thomas; Terrance Warde	Darren Bravo; Dwayne Bravo; Rayad Emrit; Kyle Hope; Imran Khan; Evin Lewis; Jason Mohammed; Sunil Narine; Khary Pierre; Kieron Pollard; Nicholas Pooran; Denesh Ramdin; Ravi Rampaul; Lendl Simmons	Saurabh Netravalkar (c); Alex Amsterdam; Usman Ashraf; Elmore Hutchinson; Nosthush Kenjige; Jannisar Khan; Jaskaran Malhotra; Monank Patel; Timil Patel; Kyle Phillip; Srinivas Salver; Roy Silva; Jessy Singh; Sunny Sohal; Steven Taylor; David Wakefield	Ronsford Beaton; Yannic Cariah; Bryan Charles; Cephas Cooper; Chemar Holder; Tevin Imlach; Leonardo Julien; Kirstan Kallicharan; Kimani Melius; Jeavor Royal; Marlon Samuels; Jayden Seales; Keagan Simmons; Odean Smith	Alick Athanaze; Roland Cato; Kirk Edwards; Larry Edwards; Kavem Hodge; Ryan John; Delorn Johnson; Kyle Mayers; Obed McCoy; Shane Shillingford; Denis Smith; Devon Smith; Tyrone Theophile; Kesrick Williams

== Points tables ==
Group A

Team	Pld	W	L	T	N/R	Pts	NRR
Guyana	8	5	1	0	2	29	+1.374
Trinidad and Tobago	8	5	1	0	2	27	+1.325
West Indies B	8	2	2	0	4	14	–0.843
Windward Islands	8	1	5	0	2	9	–1.186
Canada	8	1	5	0	2	8	–0.943

Group B

Team	Pld	W	L	T	N/R	Pts	NRR
Combined Campuses and Colleges	8	5	2	0	1	26	+1.057
Jamaica	8	4	3	0	1	21	+0.067
Barbados	8	4	3	0	1	19	–0.287
Leeward Islands	8	2	4	0	2	13	–0.409
United States	8	2	5	0	1	12	–0.449

== Fixtures ==
=== Group A ===
3 October 2018
Scorecard

West Indies B 302/8 (50 overs)	v	Canada; 292/8 (50 overs)
Marlon Samuels 101 (96); Romesh Eranga 5/31 (8 overs)		Rodrigo Thomas 63 (55); Yannic Cariah 2/60 (9 overs)

West Indies B won by 10 runs
Brian Lara Stadium, Trinidad
Umpires: Christopher Taylor and Verdayne Smith
Player of the match: Marlon Samuels (West Indies B)

- West Indies B won the toss and elected to bat.
- Keagan Simmons, Kimani Melius, Tevin Imlach, Leonardo Julien, Bryan Charles (West Indies B), Rodrigo Thomas, Harsh Thaker, Salman Nazar and Sukhdeep Brar (Canada) all made their List A debuts.

3 October 2018
Scorecard

Trinidad and Tobago; 220/8 (37 overs)	v	Windward Islands; 145/8 (37 overs)
Nicholas Pooran 89 (62); Kyle Mayers 4/58 (8 overs)		Kyle Mayers 55* (72); Rayad Emrit 3/5 (7 overs)

Trinidad and Tobago won by 75 runs
Queen's Park Oval, Trinidad
Umpires: Patrick Gustard and Carl Tuckett
Player of the match: Kyle Mayers (Windward Islands)

- Windward Islands won the toss and elected to field.
- The match was reduced to 37 overs per side due to rain.
- Denis Smith (Windward Islands) made his List A debut.

5 October 2018
Scorecard

Windward Islands; 338/9 (50 overs)	v	Canada; 264 (48.1 overs)
Devon Smith 132 (109); Nikhil Dutta 2/60 (10 overs)		Navneet Dhaliwal 80 (80); Alick Athanaze 5/45 (8.1 overs)

Windward Islands won by 74 runs
Brian Lara Stadium, Trinidad
Umpires: Patrick Gustard and Christopher Taylor
Player of the match: Devon Smith (Windward Islands)

- Windward Islands won the toss and elected to bat.

5 October 2018
Scorecard

Trinidad and Tobago; 242 (49.2 overs)	v	Guyana; 207 (47.2 overs)
Nicholas Pooran 75 (81); Clinton Pestano 3/45 (10 overs)		Trevon Griffith 38 (65); Sunil Narine 3/28 (10 overs)

Trinidad and Tobago won by 35 runs
Queen's Park Oval, Trinidad
Umpires: Verdayne Smith and Carl Tuckett
Player of the match: Nicholas Pooran (Trinidad and Tobago)

- Guyana won the toss and elected to field.

7 October 2018
Scorecard

West Indies B 192 (47.1 overs)	v	Guyana; 193/1 (28.2 overs)
Keagan Simmons 44 (60); Chandrapaul Hemraj 2/28 (6 overs)		Chandrapaul Hemraj 103* (80); Chemar Holder 1/48 (7.2 overs)

Guyana won by 9 wickets
Brian Lara Stadium, Trinidad
Umpires: Christopher Taylor and Carl Tuckett
Player of the match: Chandrapaul Hemraj (Guyana)

- Guyana won the toss and elected to field.

7 October 2018
Scorecard

Canada; 207/7 (50 overs)	v	Trinidad and Tobago; 208/8 (40.4 overs)
Davy Jacobs 37 (57); Rayad Emrit 3/58 (10 overs)		Nicholas Pooran 66 (45); Sukhdeep Brar 3/39 (6 overs)

Trinidad and Tobago won by 2 wickets
Queen's Park Oval, Trinidad
Umpires: Patrick Gustard and Verdayne Smith
Player of the match: Nicholas Pooran (Trinidad and Tobago)

- Canada won the toss and elected to bat.

9 October 2018
Scorecard

Canada; 202/9 (47 overs)	v	Guyana; 204/3 (29.4 overs)
Navneet Dhaliwal 88 (110); Ramaal Lewis 2/30 (9 overs)		Christopher Barnwell 99* (77); Romesh Eranga 2/29 (6 overs)

Guyana won by 7 wickets
Brian Lara Stadium, Trinidad
Umpires: Patrick Gustard and Verdayne Smith

- Canada won the toss and elected to bat.

9 October 2018
Scorecard

West Indies B 220 (48.4 overs)	v	Windward Islands; 49/0 (7 overs)
Keagan Simmons 57 (83); Alick Athanaze 3/49 (10 overs)		Devon Smith 27* (23)

No result
Queen's Park Oval, Trinidad
Umpires: Christopher Taylor and Jacqueline Williams

- West Indies B won the toss and elected to bat.

11 October 2018
Scorecard

Guyana; 231 (49 overs)	v	Windward Islands; 138 (36.3 overs)
Sherfane Rutherford 69 (61); Larry Edwards 4/34 (10 overs)		Tyrone Theophile 32 (32); Ramaal Lewis 4/25 (7.3 overs)

Guyana won by 93 runs
Brian Lara Stadium, Trinidad
Umpires: Jonathan Blades and Gregory Brathwaite
Player of the match: Ramaal Lewis (Guyana)

- Windward Islands won the toss and elected to field.

11 October 2018
Scorecard

Trinidad and Tobago; 318/9 (50 overs)	v	West Indies B 248 (43.2 overs)
Jason Mohammed 83 (90); Bryan Charles 3/48 (10 overs)		Keagan Simmons 60 (76); Sunil Narine 3/38 (10 overs)

Trinidad and Tobago won by 70 runs
Queen's Park Oval, Trinidad
Umpires: Jacqueline Williams and Verdayne Smith
Player of the match: Jason Mohammed (Trinidad and Tobago)

- West Indies B won the toss and elected to field.
- Cephas Cooper (West Indies B) made his List A debut.

13 October 2018
Scorecard

Guyana; 291/8 (50 overs)	v	Trinidad and Tobago; 216 (47.1 overs)
Trevon Griffith 70 (83); Ravi Rampaul 3/56 (10 overs)		Lendl Simmons 70 (73); Ramaal Lewis 3/33 (10 overs)

Guyana won by 75 runs
Brian Lara Stadium, Trinidad
Umpires: Jonathan Blades and Jacqueline Williams
Player of the match: Raymon Reifer (Guyana)

- Guyana won the toss and elected to bat.

13 October 2018
Scorecard

Canada; 206/9 (50 overs)	v	Windward Islands; 188 (49.2 overs)
Srimantha Wijeratne 35 (36); Tyrone Theophile 3/33 (4 overs)		Roland Cato 50 (78); Romesh Eranga 6/21 (10 overs)

Canada won by 18 runs
Queen's Park Oval, Trinidad
Umpires: Patrick Gustard and Gregory Brathwaite
Player of the match: Romesh Eranga (Canada)

- Windward Islands won the toss and elected to field.

15 October 2018
Scorecard

Windward Islands; 227/9 (50 overs)	v	West Indies B 229/7 (46.5 overs)
Kavem Hodge 78 (126); Alzarri Joseph 3/54 (10 overs)		Odean Smith 64 (34); Larry Edwards 4/47 (10 overs)

West Indies B won by 3 wickets
Brian Lara Stadium, Trinidad
Umpires: Patrick Gustard and Jacqueline Williams
Player of the match: Odean Smith (West Indies B)

- West Indies B won the toss and elected to field.
- Brad Barnes (West Indies B) made his List A debut.

15 October 2018
Scorecard

Canada; 205/7 (50 overs)	v	Guyana; 208/6 (39.1 overs)
Nitish Kumar 51 (72); Veerasammy Permaul 2/26 (10 overs)		Raymon Reifer 61* (73); Nikhil Dutta 3/41 (10 overs)

Guyana won by 4 wickets
Queen's Park Oval, Trinidad
Umpires: Christopher Taylor and Gregory Brathwaite
Player of the match: Raymon Reifer (Guyana)

- Canada won the toss and elected to bat.

17 October 2018
Scorecard

Windward Islands; 78 (22.1 overs)	v	Trinidad and Tobago; 83/3 (9.4 overs)
Gidron Pope 37 (44); Imran Khan 3/13 (4 overs)		Lendl Simmons 52* (30); Kavem Hodge 3/48 (4.4 overs)

Trinidad and Tobago won by 7 wickets
Queen's Park Oval, Trinidad
Umpires: Jacqueline Williams and Gregory Brathwaite
Player of the match: Imran Khan (Trinidad and Tobago)

- Trinidad and Tobago won the toss and elected to field.
- Gidron Pope (Windward Islands) made his List A debut.

17 October 2018
Scorecard

West Indies B	v	Canada

Match abandoned
Queen's Park Oval, Trinidad
Umpires: Patrick Gustard and Jonathan Blades

- No toss.
- No play was possible due to rain.

19 October 2018
Scorecard

Guyana; 1/0 (0.2 overs)	v	Windward Islands

No result
Queen's Park Oval, Trinidad
Umpires: Patrick Gustard and Lyndon Rajkumar

- Windward Islands won the toss and elected to field.

19 October 2018
Scorecard

Trinidad and Tobago	v	West Indies B

Match abandoned
Queen's Park Oval, Trinidad
Umpires: Christopher Taylor and Jonathan Blades

- No toss.
- No play was possible due to rain.

21 October 2018
Scorecard

Guyana	v	West Indies B

Match abandoned
Queen's Park Oval, Trinidad
Umpires: Christopher Taylor and Jonathan Blades

- No toss.
- No play was possible due to rain.

21 October 2018
Scorecard

Trinidad and Tobago	v	Canada

Match abandoned
Queen's Park Oval, Trinidad
Umpires: Jacqueline Williams and Gregory Brathwaite

- No toss.
- No play was possible due to rain.

=== Group B ===
4 October 2018
Scorecard

Combined Campuses and Colleges; 219/8 (50 overs)	v	Jamaica; 220/3 (34.5 overs)
Keron Cottoy 40* (61); Nikita Miller 3/35 (9 overs)		Rovman Powell 79* (64); Jon-Russ Jaggesar 1/30 (9 overs)

Jamaica won by 7 wickets
Three Ws Oval, Barbados
Umpires: Danesh Ramdhanie and Gregory Brathwaite
Player of the match: Andre McCarthy (Jamaica)

- Combined Campuses and Colleges won the toss and elected to bat.
- Akeem Jordan, Linton Buchanan (Combined Campuses and Colleges) and Gordon Bryan (Jamaica) all made their List A debuts.

4 October 2018
Scorecard

Barbados; 181/9 (50 overs)	v	Leeward Islands; 37/1 (8.5 overs)
Kevin Stoute 66 (107); Jeremiah Louis 5/33 (8 overs)		Montcin Hodge 15 (19); Marquino Mindley 1/22 (4 overs)

No result
Kensington Oval, Barbados
Umpires: Nigel Duguid and Deighton Butler

- Barbados won the toss and elected to bat.
- Shayne Moseley and Leniko Boucher (Barbados) both made their List A debuts.

6 October 2018
Scorecard

Combined Campuses and Colleges; 221/9 (50 overs)	v	United States; 162 (45.4 overs)
Carlos Brathwaite 69 (61); Elmore Hutchinson 5/42 (10 overs)		Monank Patel 53 (66); Keron Cottoy 3/40 (8 overs)

Combined Campuses and Colleges won by 59 runs
Three Ws Oval, Barbados
Umpires: Leslie Reifer and Gregory Brathwaite
Player of the match: Elmore Hutchinson (United States)

- United States won the toss and elected to field.
- Monank Patel, David Wakefield and Srinivas Salver (United States) all made their List A debuts.

6 October 2018
Scorecard

Jamaica; 226 (47.4 overs)	v	Barbados; 193 (47.5 overs)
Chris Gayle 122 (144); Kevin Stoute 3/33 (10 overs)		Jonathan Carter 77 (125); Oshane Thomas 3/53 (8.5 overs)

Jamaica won by 33 runs
Kensington Oval, Barbados
Umpires: Danesh Ramdhanie and Deighton Butler
Player of the match: Chris Gayle (Jamaica)

- Barbados won the toss and elected to field.

8 October 2018
Scorecard

Leeward Islands; 130 (39.3 overs)	v	Combined Campuses and Colleges; 121 (37.1 overs)
Devon Thomas 44 (78); Yannick Ottley 3/37 (10 overs)		Nicholas Kirton 33 (60); Damion Jacobs 4/31 (10 overs)

Leeward Islands won by 9 runs
Three Ws Oval, Barbados
Umpires: Nigel Duguid and Deighton Butler
Player of the match: Damion Jacobs (Leeward Islands)

- Combined Campuses and Colleges won the toss and elected to field.

8 October 2018
Scorecard

United States; 144 (42.1 overs)	v	Jamaica; 145/3 (26.1 overs)
Timil Patel 37 (54); Nikita Miller 3/41 (10 overs)		John Campbell 56 (72); Saurabh Netravalkar 2/34 (7 overs)

Jamaica won by 7 wickets
Kensington Oval, Barbados
Umpires: Jonathan Blades and Gregory Brathwaite
Player of the match: John Campbell (Jamaica)

- United States won the toss and elected to bat.

10 October 2018
Scorecard

Barbados; 174 (49.2 overs)	v	Combined Campuses and Colleges; 178/3 (31.3 overs)
Shayne Moseley 49 (87); Carlos Brathwaite 3/21 (10 overs)		Carlos Brathwaite 50* (31); Ashley Nurse 2/43 (7.3 overs)

Combined Campuses and Colleges won by 7 wickets
Three Ws Oval, Barbados
Umpires: Danesh Ramdhanie and Zahid Bassarath
Player of the match: Carlos Brathwaite (Combined Campuses and Colleges)

- Combined Campuses and Colleges won the toss and elected to field.
- Jonathan Drakes (Combined Campuses and Colleges) made his List A debut.

10 October 2018
Scorecard

United States; 197 (49.3 overs)	v	Leeward Islands; 109 (30.1 overs)
Timil Patel 39 (80); Damion Jacobs 3/40 (10 overs)		Orlando Peters 37 (35); Nosthush Kenjige 3/22 (8 overs)

United States won by 88 runs
Kensington Oval, Barbados
Umpires: Nigel Duguid and Joel Wilson
Player of the match: Nosthush Kenjige (United States)

- Leeward Islands won the toss and elected to field.
- Kyle Phillip (United States) made his List A debut.

12 October 2018
Scorecard

Leeward Islands; 214/9 (50 overs)	v	Jamaica; 215/3 (33.4 overs)
Devon Thomas 71 (99); Derval Green 4/44 (10 overs)		John Campbell 81 (73); Orlando Peters 1/22 (4 overs)

Jamaica won by 7 wickets
Three Ws Oval, Barbados
Umpires: Leslie Reifer and Joel Wilson
Player of the match: John Campbell (Jamaica)

- Jamaica won the toss and elected to field.
- Jamie Merchant (Jamaica) made his List A debut.

12 October 2018
Scorecard

United States; 196/9 (50 overs)	v	Barbados; 200/7 (42 overs)
Steven Taylor 64 (88); Shamar Springer 3/21 (10 overs)		Justin Greaves 35 (40); Usman Ashraf 2/23 (5 overs)

Barbados won by 3 wickets
Kensington Oval, Barbados
Umpires: Danesh Ramdhanie and Zahid Bassarath
Player of the match: Shamar Springer (Barbados)

- United States won the toss and elected to bat.
- Usman Ashraf (United States) made his List A debut.

14 October 2018
Scorecard

Jamaica; 82 (26.2 overs)	v	Combined Campuses and Colleges; 83/4 (17.5 overs)
John Campbell 34 (39); Yannick Ottley 4/11 (7.2 overs)		Kyle Corbin 43 (53); Nikita Miller 2/36 (7 overs)

Combined Campuses and Colleges won by 6 wickets
Three Ws Oval, Barbados
Umpires: Leslie Reifer and Carl Tuckett
Player of the match: Yannick Ottley (Combined Campuses and Colleges)

- Combined Campuses and Colleges won the toss and elected to field.

14 October 2018
Scorecard

Leeward Islands; 226/9 (50 overs)	v	Barbados; 227/7 (49.4 overs)
Akeem Saunders 63* (62); Kevin Stoute 5/38 (10 overs)		Jonathan Carter 79* (118); Rahkeem Cornwall 2/30 (10 overs)

Barbados won by 3 wickets
Kensington Oval, Barbados
Umpires: Nigel Duguid and Deighton Butler
Player of the match: Kevin Stoute (Barbados)

- Leeward Islands won the toss and elected to bat.

16 October 2018
Scorecard

United States; 212/8 (50 overs)	v	Barbados; 215/6 (35.1 overs)
Monank Patel 80 (103); Dominic Drakes 4/44 (10 overs)		Jonathan Carter 60 (43); Usman Ashraf 2/34 (4.1 overs)

Barbados won by 4 wickets
Three Ws Oval, Barbados
Umpires: Danesh Ramdhanie and Carl Tuckett
Player of the match: Shayne Moseley (Barbados)

- Barbados won the toss and elected to field.

16 October 2018
Scorecard

Jamaica; 299/6 (50 overs)	v	Leeward Islands; 0/0 (0.5 overs)
Jermaine Blackwood 100 (115); Jeremiah Louis 2/34 (7 overs)		Montcin Hodge 0* (5)

No result
Kensington Oval, Barbados
Umpires: Leslie Reifer and Joel Wilson

- Leeward Islands won the toss and elected to field.

18 October 2018
Scorecard

Leeward Islands; 248/7 (50 overs)	v	United States; 130/7 (36 overs)
Rahkeem Cornwall 125* (93); Kyle Phillip 3/62 (8 overs)		Jaskaran Malhotra 40 (90); Orlando Peters 2/11 (2 overs)

Leeward Islands won by 47 runs (D/L method)
Three Ws Oval, Barbados
Umpires: Nigel Duguid and Leslie Reifer
Player of the match: Rahkeem Cornwall (Leeward Islands)

- Leeward Islands won the toss and elected to bat.

18 October 2018
Scorecard

Combined Campuses and Colleges; 259/7 (50 overs)	v	Barbados; 134 (35.1 overs)
Jonathan Drakes 70 (98); Shamar Springer 3/48 (8 overs)		Jonathan Carter 26 (35); Carlos Brathwaite 3/12 (3.1 overs)

Combined Campuses and Colleges won by 125 runs
Kensington Oval, Barbados
Umpires: Danesh Ramdhanie and Zahid Bassarath
Player of the match: Jonathan Drakes (Combined Campuses and Colleges)

- Barbados won the toss and elected to field.

20 October 2018
Scorecard

Combined Campuses and Colleges	v	United States

Match abandoned
Three Ws Oval, Barbados
Umpires: Joel Wilson and Zahid Bassarath

- No toss.
- No play was possible due to rain.

20 October 2018
Scorecard

Barbados; 246/5 (50 overs)	v	Jamaica; 207 (41.4 overs)
Jonathan Carter 82 (69); Christopher Lamont 1/36 (10 overs)		Andre McCarthy 83 (96); Shamar Springer 5/30 (7.4 overs)

Barbados won by 39 runs
Kensington Oval, Barbados
Umpires: Nigel Duguid and Carl Tuckett

- Barbados won the toss and elected to bat.

22 October 2018
Scorecard

United States; 240/9 (50 overs)	v	Jamaica; 166 (41.4 overs)
Monank Patel 109 (126); Jerome Taylor 4/34 (8 overs)		Jermaine Blackwood 51 (51); Timil Patel 3/15 (7.4 overs)

United States won by 74 runs
Three Ws Oval, Barbados
Umpires: Joel Wilson and Danesh Ramdhanie
Player of the match: Monank Patel (United States)

- Jamaica won the toss and elected to field.

22 October 2018
Scorecard

Leeward Islands; 209/9 (50 overs)	v	Combined Campuses and Colleges; 170/2 (38.5 overs)
Devon Thomas 46 (67); Jermaine Levy 4/48 (10 overs)		Kjorn Ottley 67 (94); Rahkeem Cornwall 1/12 (8 overs)

Combined Campuses and Colleges won by 8 wickets (D/L method)
Kensington Oval, Barbados
Umpires: Leslie Reifer and Deighton Butler
Player of the match: Jermaine Levy (Combined Campuses and Colleges)

- Leeward Islands won the toss and elected to bat.

== Finals ==
1st Semi-final
25 October 2018
Scorecard

Jamaica; 272/8 (50 overs)	v	Guyana; 276/9 (49.5 overs)
Nkrumah Bonner 76* (64); Clinton Pestano 3/56 (10 overs)		Leon Johnson 101 (136); Jerome Taylor 3/44 (10 overs)

Guyana won by 1 wicket
Kensington Oval, Barbados
Umpires: Joel Wilson and Gregory Brathwaite
Player of the match: Leon Johnson (Guyana)

- Jamaica won the toss and elected to bat.

2nd Semi-final
26 October 2018
Scorecard

Trinidad and Tobago; 92 (33 overs)	v	Combined Campuses and Colleges; 93/3 (16.2 overs)
Dwayne Bravo 27 (36); Akeem Jordan 5/18 (10 overs)		Kjorn Ottley 39* (44); Ravi Rampaul 1/15 (3 overs)

Combined Campuses and Colleges won by 7 wickets
Kensington Oval, Barbados
Umpires: Nigel Duguid and Leslie Reifer
Player of the match: Akeem Jordan (Combined Campuses and Colleges)

- Combined Campuses and Colleges won the toss and elected to field.

Final
28 October 2018
Scorecard

Guyana; 204 (49.1 overs)	v	Combined Campuses and Colleges; 205/4 (37.4 overs)
Tagenarine Chanderpaul 56 (95); Jermaine Levy 4/43 (10 overs)		Kyle Corbin 72 (53); Romario Shepherd 2/41 (6.4 overs)

Combined Campuses and Colleges won by 6 wickets
Kensington Oval, Barbados
Umpires: Joel Wilson and Gregory Brathwaite
Player of the match: Kyle Corbin (Combined Campuses and Colleges)

- Combined Campuses and Colleges won the toss and elected to field
