= 2014–15 Regional Four Day Competition =

Cricket tournament

- Dates: 14 November 2014 – 20 March 2015
- Administrator(s): WICB
- Cricket format: First-class (four-day)
- Tournament format(s): Double round-robin
- Champions: Guyana (7th title)
- Participants: 6
- Matches: 30
- Most runs: (Grenada) Devon Smith (822)
- Most wickets: (Guyana) Veerasammy Permaul (67)

The 2014–15 Regional Four Day Competition was the 49th edition of the Regional Four Day Competition, the domestic first-class cricket competition for the countries of the West Indies Cricket Board (WICB). The competition ran from 14 November 2014 to 20 March 2015, with a mid-season gap to allow for the 2014–15 Regional Super50.

Six teams contested the competition – Barbados, Guyana, Jamaica, the Leeward Islands, Trinidad and Tobago, and the Windward Islands. Unlike in previous seasons, each team played the other teams twice, once at home and once away. Guyana registered eight wins from their ten matches to claim a sixth title. Guyana's Veerasammy Permaul led the tournament in wickets, while Windward Islands batsman Devon Smith led the tournament in runs.

== Teams and squads ==
Barbados	Guyana	Jamaica
Kraigg Brathwaite (c); Sulieman Benn; Tino Best; Carlos Brathwaite; Shamarh Brooks; Jonathan Carter; Roston Chase; Kyle Corbin; Miguel Cummins; Shane Dowrich; Kirk Edwards; Ryan Hinds; Jason Holder; Shai Hope; Ashley Nurse; Omar Phillips; Kemar Roach; Dwayne Smith; Kevin Stoute; Jomel Warrican	Leon Johnson (c); Christopher Barnwell; Ronsford Beaton; Devendra Bishoo; Anthony Bramble; Shivnarine Chanderpaul; Rajindra Chandrika; Narsingh Deonarine; Assad Fudadin; Trevon Griffith; Shimron Hetmyer; Keon Joseph; Veerasammy Permaul; Raymon Reifer; Vishaul Singh	Carlton Baugh; David Bernard; Jermaine Blackwood; Nkruma Bonner; Gavon Brown; Odean Brown; Cassius Burton; John Campbell; Jon-Ross Campbell; Sheldon Cottrell; Jason Dawes; Damion Jacobs; Brandon King; Tamar Lambert; Ramaal Lewis; Andre McCarthy; Horace Miller; Nikita Miller; Marquino Mindley; Jerome Taylor; Shacaya Thomas; Keno Wallace; Chadwick Walton
Leeward Islands	Trinidad and Tobago	Windward Islands
Steve Liburd (c); Quinton Boatswain; Rahkeem Cornwall; Colin Hamer; Jahmar Hamilton; Montcin Hodge; Alzarri Joseph; Yannick Leonard; Jeremiah Louis; Anthony Martin; Orlando Peters; Sherwin Peters; Austin Richards; Lyndel Richardson; Akeem Saunders; Jacques Taylor; Devon Thomas; Gavin Tonge; Hayden Walsh, Jr.; Kelbert Walters	Rayad Emrit (c); Yannic Cariah; Bryan Charles; Derone Davis; Mark Deyal; Shannon Gabriel; Akeal Hosein; Steven Katwaroo; Imran Khan; Evin Lewis; Jason Mohammed; Kjorn Ottley; Yannick Ottley; Kieron Pollard; Nicholas Pooran; Denesh Ramdin; Marlon Richards; Daniel St Clair; Lendl Simmons; Jeremy Solozano	Liam Sebastien (c); Sunil Ambris; Miles Bascombe; Alston Bobb; Johnson Charles; Romel Currency; Craig Emmanuel; Andre Fletcher; Lindon James; Delorn Johnson; Keddy Lesporis; Mervin Matthew; Nelon Pascal; Kenroy Peters; Dalton Polius; Jerlani Robinson; Shane Shillingford; Denis Smith; Devon Smith; Tyrone Theophile

== Points table ==
Team	Pld	W	L	D	T	BtP	BlP	P
Guyana	10	8	1	1	0	21	28	148
Barbados	10	5	1	4	0	18	27	117
Windward Islands	10	5	4	1	0	23	23	109
Jamaica	10	3	5	2	0	6	27	75
Trinidad and Tobago	10	2	6	2	0	10	25	65
Leeward Islands	10	2	8	0	0	6	24	54
Source: Cricinfo, 2 January 2016

== Fixtures ==
14–16 November 2014
Scorecard

Guyana	v	Leeward Islands
343 (126.5 overs)		94 (47.1 overs)
		239 (79.4 overs)

Guyana won by an innings and 10 runs
Guyana National Stadium, Providence
Player of the match: Narsingh Deonarine (Guy)

14–16 November 2014
Scorecard

Jamaica	v	Windward Islands
208 (66.1 overs)		110 (48.2 overs)
162 (44 overs)		247 (89.2 overs)

Jamaica won by 13 runs
Sabina Park, Kingston
Player of the match: Alston Bobb (Win)

- Marquino Mindley and Keno Wallace (Jam) made their first-class debuts.

14–17 November 2014
Scorecard

Barbados	v	Trinidad and Tobago
360 (126.2 overs)		96 (46.4 overs)
		213/5 (68.1 overs)

Match drawn
Queen's Park Oval, Port of Spain

21–24 November 2014
Scorecard

Jamaica	v	Barbados
111/4 dec. (40 overs)		6/2 (3.4 overs)

Match drawn
Kensington Oval, Bridgetown

21–24 November 2014
Scorecard

Guyana	v	Windward Islands
291 (129.1 overs)		184 (83 overs)
175/6 dec. (57 overs)		190 (80.2 overs)

Guyana won by 92 runs
Guyana National Stadium, Providence
Player of the match: Narsingh Deonarine (Guy)

21–24 November 2015
Scorecard

Leeward Islands	v	Trinidad and Tobago
202 (84.2 overs)		130 (47 overs)
130 (58.4 overs)		203/4 (81.1 overs)

Trinidad and Tobago won by 6 wickets
Warner Park, Basseterre
Player of the match: Imran Khan (Tri)

- Jeremiah Louis (Lee) and Nicholas Pooran (Tri) made their first-class debuts.

28 November – 1 December 2014
Scorecard

Guyana	v	Barbados
261 (91 overs)		101 (42.2 overs)
66 (29.1 overs)		228 (74.5 overs)

Barbados won by 2 runs
Guyana National Stadium, Providence
Player of the match: Dwayne Smith (Bar)

28 November – 1 December 2014
Scorecard

Jamaica	v	Trinidad and Tobago
173 (64 overs)		131 (44.4 overs)
196 (73.5 overs)		201 (66.5 overs)

Jamaica won by 37 runs
Queen's Park Oval, Port of Spain
Player of the match: Nikita Miller (Jam)

- Daniel St Clair (Tri) made his first-class debut.

28 November – 1 December 2014
Scorecard

Leeward Islands	v	Windward Islands
109 (39.4 overs)		308/5 dec. (108 overs)
334 (138.5 overs)		138/1 (42.4 overs)

Windward Islands won by 9 wickets
Queen's Park, St. George's
Player of the match: Liam Sebastien (Win)

- Alzarri Joseph (Lee) made his first-class debut.

5–8 December 2014
Scorecard

Leeward Islands	v	Jamaica
103 (42.4 overs)		222 (61.5 overs)
313 (120.4 overs)		195/6 (55.1 overs)

Jamaica won by 4 wickets
Sabina Park, Kingston
Player of the match: Damion Jacobs (Jam)

- Rahkeem Cornwall (Lee) made his first-class debut.

5–8 December 2014
Scorecard

Trinidad and Tobago	v	Guyana
198 (76.4 overs)		492/8 (152.3 overs)
234 (75.2 overs)

Guyana won by an innings and 60 runs
Queen's Park Oval, Port of Spain
Player of the match: Vishaul Singh (Guy)

5–8 December 2014
Scorecard

Barbados	v	Windward Islands
352 (131.2 overs)		274 (99.5 overs)
129 (49.2 overs)		195 (70 overs)

Barbados won by 11 runs
Arnos Vale, Kingstown

6–8 February 2015
Scorecard

Barbados	v	Leeward Islands
406/6 dec. (149 overs)		136 (46.2 overs)
		80 (34 overs)

Barbados won by an innings and 190 runs
Kensington Oval, Bridgetown
Player of the match: Shane Dowrich (Bar)

6–9 February 2015
Scorecard

Guyana	v	Jamaica
314 (92.3 overs)		177 (51.1 overs)
202 (69.5 overs)		234 (89.3 overs)

Guyana won by 105 runs
Sabina Park, Kingston
Player of the match: Veerasammy Permaul (Guy)

6–9 February 2015
Scorecard

Windward Islands	v	Trinidad and Tobago
400/8 dec. (94 overs)		177 (67.4 overs)
		75 (32.1 overs)

Windward Islands won by an innings and 148 runs
Beausejour Stadium, Gros Islet
Player of the match: Tyrone Theophile (Win)

13–16 February 2015
Scorecard

Barbados	v	Trinidad and Tobago
275 (106.5 overs)		218 (60 overs)
278/5 dec. (85 overs)		113 (50.3 overs)

Barbados won by 222 runs
Kensington Oval, Bridgetown
Player of the match: Shai Hope (Bar)

13–15 February 2015
Scorecard

Leeward Islands	v	Guyana
139 (56 overs)		267 (92.4 overs)
200 (88.1 overs)		73/2 (19.2 overs)

Guyana won by 8 wickets
Sir Vivian Richards Stadium, North Sound
Player of the match: Devendra Bishoo (Guy)

13–15 February 2015
Scorecard

Jamaica	v	Windward Islands
204 (87.1 overs)		328 (108.2 overs)
102 (45.4 overs)

Windward Islands won by an innings and 22 runs
Arnos Vale, Kingstown
Player of the match: Andre Fletcher (Win)

20–23 February 2015
Scorecard

Barbados	v	Guyana
312 (130.4 overs)		221 (59 overs)
241/6 dec. (68 overs)		335/6 (96 overs)

Guyana won by 4 wickets
Kensington Oval, Bridgetown
Player of the match: Kraigg Brathwaite (Bar)

20–22 February 2015
Scorecard

Trinidad and Tobago	v	Jamaica
277 (80 overs)		167 (43.1 overs)
246 (78 overs)		177 (37.5 overs)

Trinidad and Tobago won by 179 runs
Sabina Park, Kingston
Player of the match: Imran Khan (Tri)

- Gavon Brown, Cassius Burton, and Brandon King (Jam) made their first-class debuts.

20–22 February 2015
Scorecard

Leeward Islands	v	Windward Islands
161 (60 overs)		249 (57.3 overs)
170 (71.3 overs)		84/1 (12.2 overs)

Windward Islands won by 9 wickets
Beausejour Stadium, Gros Islet
Player of the match: Kenroy Peters (Win)

6–8 March 2015
Scorecard

Jamaica	v	Guyana
258 (80.3 overs)		236 (88.2 overs)
138 (40.5 overs)		163/5 (55.4 overs)

Guyana won by 5 wickets
Guyana National Stadium, Providence
Player of the match: Veerasammy Permaul (Guy)

6–8 March 2015
Scorecard

Leeward Islands	v	Barbados
215 (80.3 overs)		353 (119 overs)
150 (45 overs		13/1 (4 overs)

Barbados won by 9 wickets
Warner Park, Basseterre

6–9 March 2015
Scorecard

Windward Islands	v	Trinidad and Tobago
350 (111.3 overs)		299 (86.4 overs)
249 (73.1 overs)		125 (47 overs)

Windward Islands won by 175 runs
National Cricket Centre, Couva
Player of the match: Kenroy Peters (Win)

- Denis Smith (Win) made his first-class debut.

13–16 March 2015
Scorecard

Barbados	v	Windward Islands
480 (152.2 overs)		416 (130.2 overs)
167/5 dec. (45.1 overs)		101/6 (45 overs)

Match drawn
Kensington Oval, Bridgetown
Player of the match: Shai Hope (Bar)

13–16 March 2015
Scorecard

Guyana	v	Trinidad and Tobago
291 (103.5 overs)		340 (114.5 overs)
266/5 dec. (93 overs)		99/3 (32 overs)

Match drawn
Guyana National Stadium, Providence
Player of the match: Devendra Bishoo (Guy)

- Bryan Charles (Tri) made his first-class debut.

13–16 March 2015
Scorecard

Jamaica	v	Leeward Islands
175 (45.5 overs)		285 (101.1 overs)
274 (94.1 overs)		168/6 (51.3 overs)

Leeward Islands won by 4 wickets
Warner Park, Basseterre
Player of the match: Devon Thomas (Lee)

20–23 March 2015
Scorecard

Barbados	v	Jamaica
310 (97.3 overs)		228 (94.1 overs)
303/9 (156 overs)

Match drawn
Sabina Park, Kingston
Player of the match: Jomel Warrican (Bar)

- Ramaal Lewis (Jam)

20–23 March 2015
Scorecard

Trinidad and Tobago	v	Leeward Islands
291 (79.4 overs)		277 (86 overs)
226 (70.1 overs)		245/5 (67.3 overs)

Leeward Islands won by 5 wickets
National Cricket Centre, Couva

- Mark Deyal (Tri) made his first-class debut.

20–23 March 2015
Scorecard

Windward Islands	v	Guyana
283 (85.5 overs)		427 (149.2 overs)
134 (43.1 overs)

Guyana won by an innings and 10 runs
Warner Park, Basseterre
Player of the match: Christopher Barnwell (Guy)

- Jerlani Robinson (Win) made his first-class debut.

== Statistics ==
=== Most runs ===
The top five run-scorers are included in this table, listed by runs scored and then by batting average.

Player	Team	Runs	Inns	Avg	Highest	100s	50s
Devon Smith	Windward Islands	822	16	54.80	151	2	4
Tyrone Theophile	Windward Islands	689	17	43.06	136	2	3
Kraigg Brathwaite	Barbados	660	13	60.00	182	3	2
Shai Hope	Barbados	628	15	44.85	211	2	3
Shane Dowrich	Barbados	615	15	51.25	131*	2	3

Source: CricketArchive

=== Most wickets ===
The top five wicket-takers are listed in this table, listed by wickets taken and then by bowling average.

Player	Team	Overs	Wkts	Ave	5	10	BBI
Veerasammy Permaul	Guyana	461.5	67	14.07	4	3	8/26
Devendra Bishoo	Guyana	382.1	61	17.60	4	1	6/74
Imran Khan	Trinidad and Tobago	392.0	56	21.89	4	1	6/13
Jomel Warrican	Barbados	298.4	49	14.97	5	1	8/72
Damion Jacobs	Jamaica	320.3	48	17.81	4	1	7/54

Source: CricketArchive
