= Gavon Brown =

Jamaican cricketer

Personal information
- Full name: Gavon Nicaughter Brown
- Born: 14 October 1993 (age 33); Saint Thomas Parish, Jamaica
- Batting: Right-handed
- Bowling: Left-arm fast-medium

Domestic team information
- Years: Team
- 2014/15–2016/17: Jamaica

Career statistics
Competition	First-class	List A
Matches	2	3
Runs scored	10	0
Batting average	5.00	-
100s/50s	0/0	0/0
Top score	6*	0*
Balls bowled	234	93
Wickets	3	3
Bowling average	49.33	27.00
5 wickets in innings	0	0
10 wickets in match	0	0
Best bowling	1/28	1/21
Catches/stumpings	2/–	1/–
- Source: CricketArchive, 15 August 2024

Gavon Nicaughter Brown (born 14 October 1993) is a Jamaican cricketer who has played for the Jamaican national side in West Indian domestic cricket. He is a right-handed batsman and left-arm fast-medium bowler.

Brown was born in Saint Thomas Parish. He made his first-class debut for Jamaica during the 2014–15 Regional Four Day Competition, against Trinidad and Tobago. Opening the bowling with Jason Dawes, Brown took a wicket in each innings on debut, finishing with figures of 1/47 and 1/28. He had also been named in Jamaica's squad for the 2014–15 Regional Super50, but did not play a match.

He made his List A debut for Jamaica in the 2016–17 Regional Super50 on 1 February 2017.
