= West Indian cricket team in South Africa in 2007–08 =

	West Indies	South Africa
- Dates: 14 December 2007 – 3 February 2008
Captains	Chris Gayle	Graeme Smith

Test series
- Result: South Africa won the 3-match series 2–1
Most runs	Marlon Samuels 314	Graeme Smith 299
Most wickets	Dwayne Bravo 10	Dale Steyn 20
- Player of the series: Dale Steyn (SA)

One Day International series
- Results: South Africa won the 5-match series 5–0
Most runs	Shivnarine Chanderpaul 150	Jean-Paul Duminy 227; Jacques Kallis 227
Most wickets	Daren Powell 5	Morné Morkel 7 Charl Langeveldt 7
- Player of the series: JP Duminy and Shaun Pollock (both SA)

Twenty20 International series
- Results: 2-match series drawn 1–1
Most runs	Runako Morton 32	Shaun Pollock 38
Most wickets	Jerome Taylor 5	Dale Steyn 4

The West Indies cricket team began touring South Africa on 14 December 2007. The two teams played three Test matches, five One Day Internationals and two Twenty20 Internationals before the end of the tour on 3 February 2008.

Prior to the series, West Indies had never registered a Test victory in South Africa and lost the previous series 2–0, in 2003/4 and lost the last two meetings between the two sides, in the ICC World Twenty20, where South Africa won by 3 wickets, and in the World Cup in the West Indies, where the South Africans emerged victorious by 67 runs.

The West Indies warmed up for the series with a 3–1 one-day international series victory over Zimbabwe in Zimbabwe although their preparations were hampered by a hamstring injury to acting captain Chris Gayle. South Africa beat New Zealand in Test and One Day International series while also winning the one-off Twenty20 International.

West Indian captain Ramnaresh Sarwan missed the tour through injury, meaning Gayle was captain in his absence, however thumb and hamstring injuries to Gayle left Dwayne Bravo as captain for both Twenty20 Internationals and the entire ODI series. South Africa named the same Test squad that beat both New Zealand, and Pakistan, although Neil McKenzie was added to the squad ahead of the second Test and Monde Zondeki was added ahead of the third Test.

== Twenty20 series ==
=== 1st Twenty20 ===
16 December
Scorecard

South Africa; 58/8 (13 overs)	v	West Indies; 60/5 (9.5 overs)
Johan Botha 28* (22); Jerome Taylor 3/6 (3 overs)		Runako Morton 20 (14); Dale Steyn 4/9 (3 overs)

West Indies won by 5 wickets
St George's Park, Port Elizabeth
Umpires: Ian Howell (SA) and Brian Jerling (SA)
Player of the match: Jerome Taylor (WI)

- Match reduced to 13 overs per side

=== 2nd Twenty20 ===
18 January
Scorecard

West Indies; 131/7 (20 overs)	v	South Africa; 134/6 (19.2 overs)
Dwayne Bravo 24 (17); Makhaya Ntini 2/22 (4 overs)		Shaun Pollock 36* (25); Darren Sammy 3/21 (4 overs)

South Africa won by 4 wickets
New Wanderers Stadium, Johannesburg
Umpires: Rudi Koertzen (SA) and Brian Jerling (SA)
Player of the match: Shaun Pollock (SA)

== Test series ==
=== 1st Test ===
26 – 30 December
(scorecard)

West Indies	v	South Africa
408 (133.4 overs); S Chanderpaul 104 (253); M Ntini 3/100 (30 overs)		195 (62.1 overs); AB de Villiers 59 (127); DJ Bravo 4/24 (13.1 overs)
175 (57.4 overs); D Ganga 45; PL Harris 4/35		260 (74.5 overs); JH Kallis 85 (126); FH Edwards 3/37 (13 overs)

West Indies won by 128 runs
St George's Park, Port Elizabeth, South Africa
Umpires: Aleem Dar (PAK), RB Tiffen (ZWE)
Player of the match: MN Samuels

- This is the Windies' first ever Test win in South Africa.

=== 2nd Test ===
2 – 6 January
(scorecard)

West Indies	v	South Africa
243 (92 overs); S Chanderpaul 65* (223); DW Steyn 4/60 (20 overs)		321 (118.2 overs); AG Prince 98 (225); DJ Bravo 4/82 (37 overs)
262 (101.5 overs); S Chanderpaul 70* (168); DW Steyn 4/44 (19.5 overs)		186/3 (35.2 overs); GC Smith 85 (79); RN Lewis 2/42 (8.2 overs)

South Africa won by 7 wickets
Newlands, Cape Town, South Africa
Umpires: SJA Taufel (AUS) and RB Tiffen (ZWE)
Player of the match: AG Prince

=== 3rd Test ===
10 – 14 January
(scorecard)

West Indies	v	South Africa
139 (34.3 overs); D Ramdin 30 (25); SM Pollock 4/35 (11 overs)		556/4 dec. (120 overs); GC Smith 147 (165); MN Samuels 1/90 (21 overs)
317 (86.5 overs); MN Samuels 105 (190); DW Steyn 6/72 (21.5 overs)

South Africa won by an innings and 100 runs
Kingsmead, Durban, South Africa
Umpires: Aleem Dar (PAK) and SJA Taufel (AUS)
Player of the match: AG Prince

- South African all-rounder Shaun Pollock announced his retirement from international cricket, effective at the end of the Windies tour.

== ODI series ==
=== 1st ODI ===
20 January
scorecard

West Indies; 175 (35.5 overs)	v	South Africa; 176/4 (34 overs)
Runako Morton 41 (50); Dale Steyn 2/24 (7.5 overs)		Jean-Paul Duminy 79* (88); Dwayne Bravo 1/28 (4 overs)

South Africa won by 6 wickets
SuperSport Park, Centurion, South Africa
Umpires: Rudi Koertzen, Daryl Harper (AUS)
Player of the match: Jean-Paul Duminy

- Match reduced to 36 overs per side

=== 2nd ODI ===
25 January
scorecard

South Africa; 255/9 (50 overs)	v	West Indies; 169 (48.2 overs)
Graeme Smith 86 (107); Jerome Taylor 4/34 (10 overs)		Shivnarine Chanderpaul 54 (83); Morné Morkel 4/36 (8.2 overs)

South Africa won by 86 runs
Newlands, Cape Town, South Africa
Umpires: Daryl Harper (AUS), Brian Jerling
Player of the match: Shaun Pollock

=== 3rd ODI ===
27 January
scorecard

West Indies; 252/7 (50 overs)	v	South Africa; 256/3 (48.4 overs)
Marlon Samuels 98 (88); Johan Botha 2/29 (7)		Jacques Kallis 121* (133); Marlon Samuels 1/38 (10)

South Africa won by 7 wickets
St George's Park, Port Elizabeth, South Africa
Umpires: Daryl Harper (AUS) & Ian Howell (RSA)
Player of the match: Jacques Kallis (RSA)

=== 4th ODI ===
1 February
scorecard

West Indies; 263/9 (50 overs)	v	South Africa; 266/5 (47.5 overs)
Sewnarine Chattergoon 48 (68); André Nel 2/44 (10 overs)		AB de Villiers 77 (86); Dwayne Bravo 2/31 (8.5 overs)

South Africa won by 5 wickets
Kingsmead, Durban, South Africa
Umpires: Daryl Harper (AUS), Ian Howell
Player of the match: AB de Villiers (RSA)

=== 5th ODI ===
3 February
scorecard

West Indies; 295/7 (50 overs)	v	South Africa; 211/2 (28.5 overs)
Devon Smith 91 (76); Charl Langeveldt 3/61 (10 overs)		Herschelle Gibbs 102 (84); Daren Powell 2/39 (7 overs)

South Africa won by 8 wickets (D/L method)
New Wanderers Stadium, Johannesburg, South Africa
Umpires: Daryl Harper (AUS), Brian Jerling
Player of the match: Herschelle Gibbs

- South Africa set target of 211 off 31 overs

== Tour matches ==
=== Makhaya Ntini Invitation XI v West Indians ===
14 December
Scorecard

Makhaya Ntini Invitation XI (South Africa); 176/9 (25 overs)	v	West Indies; 110/5 (16.2 overs)
Shaun Pollock 54 (40); Fidel Edwards 2/23 (5 overs)		Shivnarine Chanderpaul 44 (27); Shaun Pollock 1/5 (3 overs)

Makhaya Ntini Invitation XI won by 5 runs (D/L method)
Buffalo Park, East London
Umpires: Ian Howell (SA) and Brian Jerling (SA)

- West Indians set a revised total of 116 runs from 16.2 overs

=== South Africa A v West Indians ===
19 – 22 December
scorecard

West Indies	v	South Africa A
193 (65.1 overs); Runako Morton 54 (88); Monde Zondeki 5/39 (16 overs)		371 (106.5 overs); Justin Ontong 114* (145); Dwayne Bravo 6/51 (15.5 overs)
214 (78.3 overs); Dwayne Bravo 67 (132); Johan Botha 4/20 (13.3 overs)		39/0 (9 overs); Morné van Wyk 23* (33)

South Africa A won by 10 wickets
Buffalo Park, East London, Eastern Cape
Umpires: Ian Howell and Brian Jerling
Player of the match: Monde Zondeki
