= Usman Ashraf =

Usman Ashraf can refer to:

- Usman Ashraf (American cricketer) (born 1996)
- Usman Ashraf (Pakistani cricketer) (born 1989)
