= Alwyn Williams =

Alwyn Williams may refer to:

- Alwyn Williams (bishop) (1888–1968), Bishop of Durham, 1939–52, and Bishop of Winchester, 1952–61
- Alwyn Williams (cricketer), Jamaican cricketer
- Alwyn Williams (geologist) (1921–2004), Welsh geologist
