= Akim Frazer =

Jamaican cricketer (born 1995)

Personal information
- Full name: Akim Frazer
- Born: 2 May 1995 (age 31)
- Source: Cricinfo, 22 February 2019

Akim Frazer (born 2 May 1995) is a Jamaican cricketer. He made his first-class debut for Jamaica in the 2018–19 Regional Four Day Competition on 21 February 2019. On debut, he took eight wickets and was named the player of the match.
