= Garth Garvey =

Jamaican cricketer (born 1990)

Personal information
- Born: 29 October 1990 (age 36); Jamaica
- Source: Cricinfo, 27 October 2017

Garth Garvey (born 29 October 1990) is a Jamaican cricketer. He made his first-class debut for Jamaica in the 2017–18 Regional Four Day Competition on 26 October 2017. In June 2021, he was selected to take part in the Minor League Cricket tournament in the United States following the players' draft.
