= Romesh Eranga =

Sri Lankan-born Canadian cricketer

Personal information
- Full name: Galkandage Don Romesh Eranga
- Born: 16 June 1985 (age 41); Ragama, Sri Lanka
- Batting: Left-handed
- Bowling: Left-arm medium-fast
- Role: Bowler

International information
- National side: Canada (2019–2019)
- T20I debut (cap 44): 18 August 2019 v Cayman Islands
- Last T20I: 27 October 2019 v UAE

Domestic team information
- Years: Team
- 2007-2013: Burgher

Career statistics
Competition	FC	List A	T20
Matches	40	27	1
Runs scored	686	127	16
Batting average	12.94	18.14	–
100s/50s	0/1	0/0	0/0
Top score	54	19*	16*
Balls bowled	4739	1053	18
Wickets	118	51	0
Bowling average	27.00	16.17	–
5 wickets in innings	4	3	–
10 wickets in match	0	0	–
Best bowling	6/82	8/30	–
Catches/stumpings	13/–	4/–	0/–
- Source: Cricinfo, 27 October 2019

Romesh Eranga (born 16 June 1985) is a Sri Lankan-born Canadian cricketer. He bowls left-arm medium-fast and bats left-handed.

Eranga became only the third Sri Lankan to take eight wickets in a List A innings; he achieved the feat when he took 8/30 for Burgher Recreation Club against Sri Lanka Army Sports Club.

In October 2018, he was named in Canada's squad for the 2018–19 Regional Super50 tournament in the West Indies. He was the joint-leading wicket-taker in the tournament, with seventeen dismissals in six matches. In April 2019, he was named in Canada's squad for the 2019 ICC World Cricket League Division Two tournament in Namibia. In June 2019, he was selected to play for the Winnipeg Hawks franchise team in the 2019 Global T20 Canada tournament.

In August 2019, he was named in Canada's squad for the Regional Finals of the 2018–19 ICC T20 World Cup Americas Qualifier tournament. He made his Twenty20 International (T20I) debut for Canada against the Cayman Islands on 18 August 2019. In September 2019, he was named in Canada's squad for the 2019 Malaysia Cricket World Cup Challenge League A tournament. In October 2019, he was named in Canada's squad for the 2019 ICC T20 World Cup Qualifier tournament in the United Arab Emirates.

== See also ==
- List of List A cricket records
