= Kian Pemberton =

West Indian cricketer

Personal information
- Full name: Kian Pemberton

Domestic team information
- Years: Team
- 2018-present: Leeward Islands

Career statistics
Competition	FC
Matches	1
Runs scored	1
Batting average	0.50
100s/50s	0/0
Top score	1
Balls bowled	12
Wickets	0
Bowling average	-
5 wickets in innings	-
10 wickets in match	-
Best bowling	-/-
Catches/stumpings	1/0
- Source: Cricinfo, 21 March 2019

Kian Pemberton is a West Indian cricketer. He made his first-class debut for the Leeward Islands in the 2018–19 Regional Four Day Competition on 28 February 2019. Prior to his first-class debut, he was named in the West Indies' squad for the 2018 Under-19 Cricket World Cup.
