= David Wakefield (cricketer) =

American cricketer (born 1994)

Personal information
- Born: July 14, 1994 (age 32); Charlotte, North Carolina, United States
- Source: Cricinfo, October 6, 2018

David Wakefield (born July 14, 1994) is an American cricketer. In August 2018, he was named in the United States' squad for the 2018–19 ICC World Twenty20 Americas Qualifier tournament in Morrisville, North Carolina.

In October 2018, he was named in the United States' squad for the 2018–19 Regional Super50 tournament in the West Indies. He made his List A debut for the United States in the 2018–19 Regional Super50 tournament on October 6, 2018.
