= Linton Buchanan =

West Indian cricketer

Personal information
- Full name: Linton Buchanan
- Source: Cricinfo, 5 October 2018

Linton Buchanan is a West Indian cricketer. He made his List A debut for Combined Campuses and Colleges in the 2018–19 Regional Super50 tournament on 4 October 2018.
