= Paul Harrison (Jamaican cricketer) =

Jamaican cricketer (born 1988)

Personal information
- Full name: Paul Harrison
- Born: 1988 (age 37–38); Jamaica
- Source: Cricinfo, 5 November 2017

Paul Harrison (born 1988) is a Jamaican cricketer. He made his first-class debut for Jamaica in the 2017–18 Regional Four Day Competition on 2 November 2017.
