= Colin Hamer =

Sint Maarten cricketer

Personal information
- Full name: Colin Keville Hamer
- Born: 6 February 1988 (age 38); Georgetown, Guyana
- Batting: Right-handed
- Bowling: Right-arm leg-break

Domestic team information
- Years: Team
- 2006–2015: Leeward Islands
- Source: CricketArchive, 1 January 2016

Colin Keville Hamer (born 6 February 1988) is a cricketer who has played for the Leeward Islands in West Indian domestic cricket.

Born in Georgetown, the capital of Guyana, Hamer emigrated to Sint Maarten with his family at an early age, learning to play cricket on the island. In August 2005, he played several matches for the Leeward Islands under-19 team, which included a haul of 3/35 in a one-day match against the Guyana under-19s. Hamer, a right-arm leg spinner, made his first-class debut for the Leewards in late January 2006, against Barbados in the Carib Beer Cup. In the match, played at the Addelita Cancryn Junior High School Ground in Charlotte Amalie, he took 1/70 in the first innings and 2/29 in the second innings, which included the wicket of Test cricketer Ryan Hinds. Hamer became the first cricketer from Sint Maarten to play at first-class level. He did not play again for the Leewards until the 2014–15 Regional Four Day Competition, against Jamaica, but was retained in the squad for the 2015–16 competition.
