= Josh Thomas (West Indian cricketer) =

West Indian cricketer

Personal information
- Full name: Josh Thomas
- Born: 20 December 1991 (age 34); Grenada
- Batting: Right-handed
- Bowling: Right-arm fast-medium

Domestic team information
- Years: Team
- 2018/19–2022: Windward Islands
- First-class debut: 6 December 2018 Windward Islands v Guyana
- Last First-class: 25 May 2022 Windward Islands v Leeward Islands

Career statistics
Competition	First-class
Matches	16
Runs scored	82
Batting average	5.12
100s/50s	0/0
Top score	15
Balls bowled	2,434
Wickets	46
Bowling average	31.13
5 wickets in innings	0
10 wickets in match	0
Best bowling	4/44
Catches/stumpings	4/–
- Source: Cricinfo, 10 October 2022

Josh Thomas (born 20 December 1991) is a West Indian cricketer. He made his first-class debut on 6 December 2018, for the Windward Islands in the 2018–19 Regional Four Day Competition.
