= Keagan Simmons =

West Indian cricketer (born 1999)

Personal information
- Born: 26 March 1999 (age 27)

Career statistics
Competition	FC	LA
Matches	3	7
Runs scored	127	203
Batting average	31.75	33.83
100s/50s	0/1	0/2
Top score	89	60
Balls bowled	-	-
Wickets	-	-
Bowling average	-	-
5 wickets in innings	-	-
10 wickets in match	-	-
Best bowling	-/-	-/-
Catches/stumpings	1/–	2/–
- Source: Cricinfo, 10 October 2021

Keagan Simmons (born 26 March 1999) is a West Indian cricketer. He made his List A debut for West Indies B in the 2018–19 Regional Super50 tournament on 3 October 2018. He was the leading run-scorer for West Indies B in the tournament, with 162 runs in five matches. Prior to his List A debut, he was named in the West Indies squad for the 2018 Under-19 Cricket World Cup. In November 2019, he was named in Trinidad and Tobago's squad for the 2019–20 Regional Super50 tournament. He made his first-class debut on 9 January 2020, for Trinidad and Tobago in the 2019–20 West Indies Championship.
