= Jervin Benjamin =

West Indian cricketer (born 1994)

Personal information
- Full name: Jervin Gian Benjamin
- Born: 16 December 1994 (age 31); Dominica
- Source: Cricinfo, 27 October 2017

Jervin Gian Benjamin (born 16 December 1994) is a Dominican cricketer. He made his first-class debut for the Windward Islands in the 2017–18 Regional Four Day Competition on 26 October 2017. He made his List A debut on 17 November 2019, for Combined Campuses and Colleges in the 2019–20 Regional Super50 tournament.
