= Cassius Burton =

Jamaican cricketer (born 1991)

Personal information
- Full name: Cassius Odayne Burton
- Born: November 12, 1991 (age 35); Manchester Parish, Jamaica
- Batting: Right-handed
- Bowling: Right-arm leg spin

Domestic team information
- Years: Team
- 2015: Combined Campuses
- 2015: Jamaica

Career statistics
Competition	FC	LA
Matches	1	18
Runs scored	4	236
Batting average	2.00	15.73
100s/50s	0/0	0/0
Top score	3	38*
Balls bowled	6	0
Wickets	0	0
Bowling average	–	–
5 wickets in innings	0	0
10 wickets in match	0	0
Best bowling	–	–
Catches/stumpings	0/0	6/0
- Source: Cricinfo, 5 December 2025

Cassius Odayne Burton (born 12 November 1991) is a Jamaican cricketer who has played for both the Jamaica national team and the Combined Campuses and Colleges in West Indian domestic cricket.

Burton made his List A debut in January 2015, playing for the Combined Campuses against Guyana in the 2014–15 Regional Super50. He played only one other match at the tournament, in the team's semi-final loss to Trinidad and Tobago. Burton's first-class debut came later in the season, during the 2014–15 Regional Four Day Competition. In that competition, he played for Jamaica rather than the Combined Campuses.
