= Stanny Simon =

West Indian cricketer

Personal information
- Full name: Stanny Simon
- Born: Antigua and Barbuda
- Source: Cricinfo, 13 November 2017

Stanny Simon is a cricketer from Antigua and Barbuda. He made his first-class debut for the Leeward Islands in the 2017–18 Regional Four Day Competition on 9 November 2017.
