= Shakeem Clarke =

Barbadian cricketer (born 1995)

Personal information
- Born: 9 April 1995 (age 31); Barbados
- Batting: Right-handed
- Bowling: Right-arm fast-medium
- Relatives: Sylvester Clarke (father)

Domestic team information
- Years: Team
- 2017/18: Barbados

Career statistics
Competition	First-class
Matches	3
Runs scored	8
Batting average	–
100s/50s	0/0
Top score	8*
Balls bowled	157
Wickets	2
Bowling average	61.00
5 wickets in innings	0
10 wickets in match	0
Best bowling	2/15
Catches/stumpings	0/–
- Source: Cricinfo, 8 August 2025

Shakeem Clarke (born 9 April 1995) is a Barbadian cricketer. He made his first-class debut for Barbados in the 2017–18 Regional Four Day Competition on 26 October 2017.
