= Gordon Bryan =

Gordon Bryan may refer to:

- Gordon Bryan (cricketer) (born 1992), Jamaican cricketer
- Gordon Bryan (pianist) (1895–1957), British pianist

== See also ==
- Bryan Gordon
