= Sukhdeep Brar =

Canadian cricketer

Personal information
- Full name: Sukhdeep Brar
- Source: Cricinfo, 4 October 2018

Sukhdeep Brar is a Canadian cricketer. He made his List A debut for Canada in the 2018–19 Regional Super50 tournament on 3 October 2018.
