= Srinivas Salver =

American cricketer (born 1984)

Personal information
- Born: June 9, 1984 (age 42)
- Source: Cricinfo, October 6, 2018

Srinivas Salver (born June 9, 1984) is an American cricketer. In October 2018, he was named in the United States' squad for the 2018–19 Regional Super50 tournament in the West Indies. He made his List A debut for the United States in the 2018–19 Regional Super50 tournament on October 6, 2018.
