= Keno Wallace =

West Indian cricketer (born 1989)

Personal information
- Full name: Keno Kevon Wallace
- Born: 10 September 1989 (age 37); St.Thomas, Jamaica
- Batting: Right-handed
- Bowling: Right-arm fast
- Role: Bowler

Domestic team information
- Years: Team
- Jamaica
- Source: ESPNcricinfo, 18 December 2017

Keno Kevon Wallace (born 10 September 1989) is a West Indian first-class cricketer.

== Domestic career ==
Keno Wallace made his debut for Jamaica in November 2014 in West Indies' Regional Four Day Competition against Windward Island Volcanoes. He was a promising fast bowler and also one of the only two non-retained player along with Marquino Mindley in a star-studded Jamaican squad. The squad comprised some big names of West Indies cricket like Jermaine Blackwood, Carlton Baugh, Jason Dawes, Nkrumah Bonner with Tamar Lambert being the skipper of the team. He played 2 matches in the season, the next being against the Leewards Islands and went wicketless in both matches. These 2 matches remain his only first class appearances till date. While his career has suffered due to a number of injuries since his debut, he tried to make comebacks into the team by showing commendable performances at club level like he did in 2018-19 season taking 20 wickets for White Horses in the Social Development Commission (SDC) T20 competition. He continues to play local club cricket. He took 3 wickets for St Thomas against Kensington for a winning cause in the Jamaica Cricket Association (JCA) All-island limited-overs tournament.
