= Clinton Pestano =

Guyanese cricketer (born 1992)

Personal information
- Born: 11 November 1992 (age 34); Skeldon, Guyana

Domestic team information
- Years: Team
- 2017-present: Guyana

Career statistics
| Competition | FC | List A |
|---|---|---|
| Matches | 9 | 14 |
| Runs scored | 272 | 50 |
| Batting average | 19.42 | 10.00 |
| 100s/50s | 0/1 | 0/0 |
| Top score | 69 | 21 |
| Balls bowled | 1,226 | 600 |
| Wickets | 23 | 18 |
| Bowling average | 30.26 | 25.16 |
| 5 wickets in innings | 0 | 0 |
| 10 wickets in match | 0 | 0 |
| Best bowling | 4/31 | 3/45 |
| Catches/stumpings | 1/0 | 1/0 |
- Source: Cricinfo, 9 October 2021

Clinton Pestano (born 11 November 1992) is a Guyanese cricketer. He made his first-class debut for Guyana in the 2016–17 Regional Four Day Competition on 23 March 2017. He made his List A debut for Guyana in the 2017–18 Regional Super50 on 2 February 2018.

He was the leading wicket-taker for Guyana in the 2018–19 Regional Super50 tournament, with fifteen dismissals in nine matches. In October 2019, he was named in Guyana's squad for the 2019–20 Regional Super50 tournament.
