= Hermitage (Carriacou) =

- Village
- Location within Grenada
- Coordinates: 12°26′6″N 61°28′0″W
- Country: Grenada
- Dependency: Carriacou and Petite Martinique
- Time zone: UTC-4

Hermitage is a town on the island of Carriacou in Grenada.
