= Denis Smith (West Indian cricketer) =

Grenadian cricketer (born 1991)

Personal information
- Born: 30 October 1991 (age 35)

Career statistics
| Competition | FC | LA |
|---|---|---|
| Matches | 24 | 11 |
| Runs scored | 835 | 137 |
| Batting average | 20.36 | 19.57 |
| 100s/50s | 0/3 | 0/0 |
| Top score | 84 | 45* |
| Balls bowled | - | - |
| Wickets | - | - |
| Bowling average | - | - |
| 5 wickets in innings | - | - |
| 10 wickets in match | - | - |
| Best bowling | -/- | -/- |
| Catches/stumpings | 52/7 | 5/1 |
- Source: Cricinfo, 9 October 2021

Denis Smith (born 30 October 1991) is a Grenadian cricketer. He made his first-class debut for the Windward Islands in the 2014–15 Regional Four Day Competition on 6 March 2015. He made his List A debut for the Windward Islands in the 2018–19 Regional Super50 tournament on 3 October 2018. In October 2019, he was named in Jamaica's squad for the 2019–20 Regional Super50 tournament.
