= Tion Webster =

West Indian cricketer

Personal information
- Born: 21 April 1995 (age 31); Trinidad
- Batting: Right-handed
- Bowling: Right-arm medium
- Role: All-rounder

Domestic team information
- Years: Team
- 2016/17–: Trinidad and Tobago
- 2017–2018: Barbados Tridents (squad no. 21)
- 2018: Winnipeg Hawks
- 2019–2022: Trinbago Knight Riders

Career statistics
Competition	FC	LA	T20
Matches	26	21	25
Runs scored	1,150	500	414
Batting average	26.74	25.00	20.70
100s/50s	3/4	0/3	0/2
Top score	178	91	66*
Balls bowled	1,307	114	6
Wickets	20	3	0
Bowling average	43.20	39.66	–
5 wickets in innings	1	0	–
10 wickets in match	0	0	–
Best bowling	5/36	1/13	–
Catches/stumpings	18/–	7/–	10/–
- Source: Cricinfo, 14 August 2024

Tion Webster (born 21 April 1995) is a Trinidad and Tobago cricketer. He made his first-class debut for Trinidad and Tobago in the 2016–17 Regional Four Day Competition on 7 April 2017. He made his Twenty20 debut for Barbados Tridents in the 2017 Caribbean Premier League on 20 August 2017.

In November 2017, he scored his maiden century in first-class cricket, making 178 for against Trinidad and Tobago against Jamaica in the 2017–18 Regional Four Day Competition. He made his List A debut for Trinidad and Tobago in the 2017–18 Regional Super50 on 30 January 2018.

On 3 June 2018, he was selected to play for the Winnipeg Hawks in the players' draft for the inaugural edition of the Global T20 Canada tournament. In November 2019, he was named in Trinidad and Tobago's squad for the 2019–20 Regional Super50 tournament. In July 2020, he was named in the Trinbago Knight Riders squad for the 2020 Caribbean Premier League.
