= Usman Ashraf (American cricketer) =

American cricketer (born 1996)

Personal information
- Born: August 24, 1996 (age 30); Karachi, Pakistan
- Source: Cricinfo, October 13, 2018

Usman Ashraf (born August 24, 1996) is an American cricketer. In August 2018, he was named in the United States' squad for the 2018–19 ICC World Twenty20 Americas Qualifier tournament in Morrisville, North Carolina.

In October 2018, he was named in the United States' squad for the 2018–19 Regional Super50 tournament in the West Indies. He made his List A debut for the United States in the 2018–19 Regional Super50 tournament on October 12, 2018.

In June 2019, he was named in a 30-man training squad for the United States cricket team, ahead of the Regional Finals of the 2018–19 ICC T20 World Cup Americas Qualifier tournament in Bermuda. In June 2021, he was selected to take part in the Minor League Cricket tournament in the United States following the players' draft.
