= Shayne Moseley =

Barbadian cricketer (born 1994)

Personal information
- Full name: Shayne Akeel Richard Moseley
- Born: 11 April 1994 (age 32); Christ Church, Barbados
- Batting: Left-handed
- Bowling: Right-arm medium-fast
- Role: Batter

International information
- National side: West Indies
- Test debut (cap 325): 3 February 2021 v Bangladesh
- Last Test: 11 February 2021 v Bangladesh

Domestic team information
- Years: Team
- 2017-present: Barbados

Career statistics
| Competition | Test | FC | LA |
|---|---|---|---|
| Matches | 2 | 32 | 8 |
| Runs scored | 28 | 1,773 | 174 |
| Batting average | 7.00 | 30.56 | 21.75 |
| 100s/50s | 0/0 | 4/11 | 0/1 |
| Top score | 12 | 155* | 60 |
| Catches/stumpings | 3/– | 15/– | 0/– |
- Source: Cricinfo, 14 February 2021

Shayne Moseley (born 11 April 1994) is a Barbadian cricketer. He made his international debut for the West Indies cricket team in February 2021.

== Career ==
He made his first-class debut for Barbados in the 2017–18 Regional Four Day Competition on 26 October 2017. He made his List A debut for Barbados in the 2018–19 Regional Super50 tournament on 4 October 2018.

In June 2020, Moseley was named as one of eleven reserve players in the West Indies' Test squad, for their series against England. The Test series was originally scheduled to start in May 2020, but was moved back to July 2020 due to the COVID-19 pandemic. In December 2020, Moseley was named in the West Indies' Test squad for their series against Bangladesh. He made his Test debut for the West Indies, against Bangladesh, on 3 February 2021.
