= Alwyn Williams (cricketer) =

Jamaican cricketer

Personal information
- Full name: Alwyn Williams

Career statistics
Competition	FC
Matches	5
Runs scored	56
Batting average	7.00
100s/50s	0/0
Top score	18
Balls bowled	349
Wickets	4
Bowling average	46.50
5 wickets in innings	0
10 wickets in match	0
Best bowling	2/28
Catches/stumpings	9/–
- Source: Cricinfo, 9 October 2021

Alwyn Williams is a Jamaican cricketer. He made his first-class debut for Jamaica in the 2018–19 Regional Four Day Competition on 28 February 2019. In June 2020, he was selected by Jamaica, in the players' draft hosted by Cricket West Indies ahead of the 2020–21 domestic season.
