= Kenroy Williams =

West Indian cricketer (1984–2024)

Personal information
- Full name: Kenroy Da Costa Williams
- Born: 9 August 1984; Harlington, Saint Philip, Barbados
- Died: 4 November 2024 (aged 40); Harlington, Saint Philip, Barbados
- Batting: Right-handed
- Bowling: Right-arm offspin

Domestic team information
- Years: Team
- 2004–2018: Barbados
- 2019: Jamaica

Career statistics
| Competition | FC | LA | T20 |
|---|---|---|---|
| Matches | 29 | 19 | 1 |
| Runs scored | 915 | 240 | – |
| Batting average | 20.33 | 17.14 | – |
| 100s/50s | 0/4 | 0/0 | – |
| Top score | 82 | 40* | – |
| Balls bowled | 2,955 | 475 | – |
| Wickets | 47 | 7 | – |
| Bowling average | 29.12 | 44.85 | – |
| 5 wickets in innings | 1 | 0 | – |
| 10 wickets in match | 0 | 0 | – |
| Best bowling | 5/50 | 2/29 | – |
| Catches/stumpings | 11/– | 5/– | 0/– |
- Source: CricInfo, 18 November 2022

Kenroy Da Costa Williams (9 August 1984 – 4 November 2024) was a Barbadian cricketer who represented the West Indies at A team level. An all-rounder, he was known as an aggressive and powerful right-handed batsman who bowled right-arm off spin.

In May 2018, he was selected to play for the Jamaica national cricket team in the Professional Cricket League draft, ahead of the 2018–19 season.

Williams died from cancer on 4 November 2024, at the age of 40.
