= Montcin Hodge =

Anguillan cricketer (born 1987)

Personal information
- Full name: Montcin Verniel Hodge
- Born: 29 September 1987 (age 39); Anguilla
- Batting: Right-handed
- Bowling: Right-arm off-break
- Role: Batsman

Domestic team information
- Years: Team
- 2006–present: Anguilla
- 2008–2023: Leeward Islands
- 2013: Antigua Hawksbills

Career statistics
Competition	FC	LA	T20
Matches	95	58	5
Runs scored	4,671	1,310	97
Batting average	28.65	23.39	24.25
100s/50s	4/33	0/10	0/1
Top score	158	82	75*
Balls bowled	6	–	12
Wickets	0	–	2
Bowling average	–	–	11.50
5 wickets in innings	–	–	0
10 wickets in match	–	–	0
Best bowling	–	–	2/23
Catches/stumpings	63/0	10/0	1/0
- Source: , 11 March 2026

Montcin Verniel Hodge (born 29 September 1987) is an Anguillian cricketer and former member of the Leeward Islands cricket team.

== Playing career ==
After making his Twenty20 debut for Anguilla in 2006, Hodge made his first class cricket debut for the Leeward Islands cricket team in January 2008. In 2013, Hodge was included in the Antigua Hawksbills squad for the inaugural season of the Twenty20 Caribbean Premier League.

In the 2018-19 Regional Four Day Competition, he was the leading run-scorer for the Leeward Islands team, and 2nd highest in the competition, behind only Devon Smith. He scored a career-best 158 that season against Trinidad and Tobago, and followed up with 77 not out in the 2nd innings. In the summer of 2023, Montcin travelled to Yorkshire, England, to play for Whitley Hall Cricket Club in the ECB Yorkshire South Premier League. Hodge last appeared for Leeward Islands in first class cricket in the 2023 West Indies Championship.
