= Larry Edward =

West Indian cricketer (born 1995)

Personal information
- Born: 16 February 1995 (age 31)
- Batting: Left-handed
- Bowling: Slow left arm orthodox

Domestic team information
- Years: Team
- 2016–Present: Windward Islands
- 2017: Combined Campuses

Career statistics
Competition	First-class	List A
Matches	18	33
Runs scored	190	125
Batting average	11.17	9.61
100s/50s	0/0	0/0
Top score	43	21*
Balls bowled	3,768	1,494
Wickets	53	42
Bowling average	31.28	25.54
5 wickets in innings	2	0
10 wickets in match	0	0
Best bowling	6/20	4/34
Catches/stumpings	12/–	11/–
- Source: ESPNcricinfo, 1 August 2022

Larry Edward (born 16 February 1995) is a cricketer who represents the Windward Islands national team in West Indian domestic cricket. He made his first-class debut for the Windward Islands in the 2015–16 Regional Four Day Competition on 18 March 2016. He made his List A debut for Combined Campuses and Colleges in the 2016–17 Regional Super50 on 24 January 2017.

He was the leading wicket-taker for the Windward Islands in the 2018–19 Regional Super50 tournament, with thirteen dismissals in eight matches. In October 2019, he was named in the Windward Islands' squad for the 2019–20 Regional Super50 tournament.

In June 2020, he was selected by the Windward Islands, in the players' draft hosted by Cricket West Indies ahead of the 2020–21 domestic season. He made his Twenty20 debut on 11 September 2022, for Saint Lucia Kings in the 2022 Caribbean Premier League.
