= West Indian cricket team in Zimbabwe in 2007–08 =

West Indies cricket team in Zimbabwe in 2007–08
	West Indies	Zimbabwe
- Dates: 30 November – 9 December 2007
Captains	Chris Gayle	Prosper Utseya

One Day International series
- Results: West Indies won the 5-match series 3–1
Most runs	Morton 250; Chanderpaul 166; Samuels 134	Sibanda 127; Masakadza 122; Matsikenyeri 112
Most wickets	Taylor 11; Powell 6 Lewis 6	Chigumbura 7 Utseya 6 Chibhabha 4
- Player of the series: Jerome Taylor (West Indies)

The West Indies cricket team toured Zimbabwe for five One Day Internationals in November and December 2007.

== ODI series ==
=== 1st ODI ===
30 November
Scorecard

Zimbabwe; 274/8 (50 overs)	v	West Indies; 244/8 (50 overs)
Chamu Chibhabha 73 (85); Chris Gayle 2/35 (6 overs)		Shivnarine Chanderpaul 127* (138); Elton Chigumbura 3/25 (8 overs)

Zimbabwe won by 30 runs
Harare Sports Club, Harare
Umpires: Kevan Barbour (Zim) and Brian Jerling (SA)
Player of the match: Chamu Chibhabha (Zim)

- West Indies won the toss and elected to field.

=== 2nd ODI ===
2 December
Scorecard

West Indies; 286/9 (50 overs)	v	Zimbabwe; 176 (44.3 overs)
Runako Morton 79 (94); Chamu Chibhabha 2/36 (4 overs)		Stuart Matsikenyeri 37 (44); Rawl Lewis 3/43 (9.3 overs)

West Indies won by 110 runs
Harare Sports Club, Harare
Umpires: Brian Jerling (SA) and Russell Tiffin (Zim)
Player of the match: Runako Morton (WI)

- Zimbabwe won the toss and elected to field.

=== 3rd ODI ===
5 December
Scorecard

Zimbabwe; 139 (37.5 overs)	v	West Indies; 142/4 (27.5 overs)
Tatenda Taibu 32 (46); Jerome Taylor 3/18 (9.5 overs)		Dwayne Bravo 45* (24); Prosper Utseya 2/27 (6 overs)

West Indies won by 6 wickets
Harare Sports Club, Harare
Umpires: Kevan Barbour (Zim) and Brian Jerling (SA)
Player of the match: Jerome Taylor (WI)

- West Indies won the toss and elected to field.
- Overnight rain forced a delay to the start of the match

=== 4th ODI ===
7 December
Scorecard

Zimbabwe; 232/9 (50 overs)	v	West Indies; 234/5 (47 overs)
Vusi Sibanda 96 (144); Jerome Taylor 5/48 (10 overs)		Runako Morton 79 (109); Prosper Utseya 3/40 (10 overs)

West Indies won by 5 wickets
Queens Sports Club, Bulawayo
Umpires: Brian Jerling (SA) and Russell Tiffin (Zim)
Player of the match: Jerome Taylor (WI)

- West Indies won the toss and elected to field.

=== 5th ODI ===
9 December
Scorecard

West Indies	v	Zimbabwe

No result
Queens Sports Club, Bulawayo
Umpires: Kevan Barbour (Zim) & Brian Jerling (SA)

- The match was abandoned due to rain.
