= Tevyn Walcott =

West Indian cricketer (born 1994)

Personal information
- Full name: Tevyn Terrel Walcott
- Born: 25 November 1994 (age 31)

Domestic team information
- Years: Team
- 2017-present: Barbados

Career statistics
Competition	FC	List A
Matches	12	20
Runs scored	504	202
Batting average	28.00	16.83
100s/50s	0/2	0/0
Top score	66	39
Catches/stumpings	39/2	25/2
- Source: Cricinfo, 9 October 2021

Tevyn Walcott (born 25 November 1994) is a Barbadian cricketer.

== Career ==
He made his first-class debut for Barbados in the 2017–18 Regional Four Day Competition on 4 January 2018. He made his List A debut for Barbados in the 2017–18 Regional Super50 on 13 February 2018. In October 2019, he was selected to play for Barbados in the 2019–20 Regional Super50 tournament.
