= Devon Thomas =

West Indian cricketer (born 1989)

Personal information
- Full name: Devon Cuthbert Thomas
- Born: 12 November 1989 (age 37); Willikies, Antigua and Barbuda
- Batting: Right-handed
- Bowling: Right-arm medium
- Role: Top-order batter

International information
- National side: West Indies (2009-2022)
- Only Test (cap 331): 8 December 2022 v Australia
- ODI debut (cap 150): 28 July 2009 v Bangladesh
- Last ODI: 10 February 2013 v Australia
- T20I debut (cap 37): 2 August 2009 v Bangladesh
- Last T20I: 14 August 2022 v New Zealand

Domestic team information
- Years: Team
- 2007–2015: Leeward Islands
- 2013–2014: Antigua Hawksbills
- 2015–2018: Jamaica
- 2016-2021: St Kitts and Nevis Patriots
- 2018–present: Leeward Islands
- 2021: Kandy Warriors
- 2022–present: Barbados Royals

Career statistics
Competition	Test	ODI	T20I	FC
Matches	1	21	12	103
Runs scored	31	238	51	5,210
Batting average	15.50	14.00	8.50	29.26
100s/50s	0/0	0/0	0/0	7/28
Top score	19	37	31*	172
Balls bowled	96	7	–	1,355
Wickets	2	2	–	27
Bowling average	33.00	5.50	–	28.55
5 wickets in innings	0	0	–	1
10 wickets in match	0	0	–	0
Best bowling	2/53	2/11	–	5/22
Catches/stumpings	1/0	23/6	10/2	201/4
- Source: ESPNcricinfo, 25 April 2023

Devon Cuthbert Thomas (born 12 November 1989) is a West Indian cricketer from Antigua.

== Career ==
=== Domestic ===
On 5 July 2009 he scored his maiden first class century playing for the Windies A against Bangladesh at Barbados's Kensington Oval. He soon became a mainstay for the Leewards, being named as vice captain for their 2014 Super50 campaign. Thomas later joined the Jamaica Scorpions for the 2015 and 2016 seasons. He eventually returned playing for the Leewards soon thereafter. Thomas was the leading run-scorer for the Leeward Islands in the 2018–19 Regional Super50 tournament, with 238 runs in eight matches. He was also the 2nd highest run-scorer for the team in the 2018-19 Regional Four Day Competition, and 4th highest scorer in the competition as a whole. In 2016, he was drafted by the St Kitts and Nevis Patriots. Since then, he has regularly played for them in the Caribbean Premier League.

In October 2019, he was named as the captain of the Leeward Islands for the 2019–20 Regional Super50 tournament. He was signed by Kandy Warriors for the 2021 Lanka Premier League. He was drafted by Pune Devils for the 2021 T10 League. In July 2022, Thomas joined CPL team Barbados Royals for the upcoming season of the said tournament.

=== International ===
A right-hand batsman and wicket keeper, he played only one season for Leeward Islands before being given his One Day International debut on 28 July 2009 against Bangladesh while the first team were involved in a pay dispute with the West Indies Cricket Board. He batted in only one innings, scoring 29* from 32 balls, and took two wickets with his right-arm medium pace bowling.

Thomas is one of three wicket-keepers to have taken wickets in a One Day International. He achieved this feat bowling against Bangladesh cricket team in the 2nd ODI of the 3 match ODI series at Windsor Park (Dominica). He picked up the wickets of Mushfiqur Rahim and Mahmudullah, but could not prevent West Indies from losing the game.

In June 2022, he was named in the West Indies' Test squad for their series against Bangladesh. He would go on to make his Test debut against Australia at Adelaide later that year, on 8 December.

On 23 May 2023, the International Cricket Council (ICC) provisionally suspended Thomas and charged him on seven counts under its anti-corruption code, the most serious allegation being an attempt to fix a match in the 2021 Lanka Premier League.
