= Sheeno Berridge =

West Indian cricketer (born 1990)

Personal information
- Full name: Sheeno Berridge
- Born: 27 September 1990 (age 36); St Kitts
- Batting: Right-handed
- Bowling: Right-arm medium
- Role: Bowler

Domestic team information
- Years: Team
- 2017–present: Leeward Islands

Career statistics
Competition	First-class	List A
Matches	27	25
Runs scored	22	22
Batting average	1.00	4.40
100s/50s	0/0	0/0
Top score	4	16
Balls bowled	3,472	1,050
Wickets	81	36
Bowling average	24.49	26.25
5 wickets in innings	2	0
10 wickets in match	0	0
Best bowling	5/22	4/36
Catches/stumpings	11/–	2/–
- Source: Cricinfo, 29 April 2023

Sheeno Berridge (born 27 September 1990) is a West Indian cricketer. He made his first-class debut for the Leeward Islands in the 2017–18 Regional Four Day Competition on 16 November 2017. He made his List A debut for the Leeward Islands in the 2017–18 Regional Super50 on 31 January 2018.
