= Devon Smith =

West Indian cricketer (born 1981)

Personal information
- Full name: Devon Sheldon Smith
- Born: 21 October 1981 (age 45); Hermitage, Saint Patrick, Grenada
- Batting: Left-handed
- Bowling: Right arm off break
- Role: Batsman

International information
- National side: West Indies (2003–2018)
- Test debut (cap 247): 10 April 2003 v Australia
- Last Test: 12 July 2018 v Bangladesh
- ODI debut (cap 114): 17 May 2003 v Australia
- Last ODI: 24 July 2013 v Pakistan
- ODI shirt no.: 28
- T20I debut (cap 16): 28 June 2007 v England
- Last T20I: 2 August 2009 v Bangladesh

Domestic team information
- Years: Team
- 1998/99–2021/22: Windward Islands
- 2013: St Lucia Zouks

Career statistics
Competition	Test	ODI	T20I	FC
Matches	43	47	6	222
Runs scored	1,760	1,059	203	14,584
Batting average	23.78	24.62	33.83	39.29
100s/50s	1/8	1/5	0/2	38/64
Top score	108	107	61	212
Balls bowled	6	17	–	604
Wickets	0	0	–	5
Bowling average	–	–	–	59.40
5 wickets in innings	–	–	–	0
10 wickets in match	–	–	–	0
Best bowling	–	–	–	2/33
Catches/stumpings	36/–	13/–	1/–	242/–
- Source: ESPNcricinfo, 27 November 2023

Devon Sheldon Smith (born 21 October 1981 in Hermitage, Saint Patrick Parish, Grenada) is a former cricketer who featured as an opening or top order left-handed batsman. He represented the West Indies and the Windward Islands in regional tournaments.With 11,321 runs,Smith is also the highest runscorer in the history of West Indian first class cricket competitions.

== Domestic cricket ==
He made his first-class debut in January 1999, opening the batting for the Windward Islands in a Regional Four Day Competition match, he made low scores of 12 and 4 in a heavy defeat to Barbados. His first half-century was brought up in his third match of the season, scoring 79 in the first innings against the Leeward Islands. This was the only time he passed 50 runs in his debut season, finishing with a batting average of 18.44 from nine innings. Despite such, he was picked to play for the West Indies A team against South Africa A in September 2000, making scores of 14 and 23 in a drawn match. Smith was later part of the Windward Islands team that won the 2000-01 Red Stripe Bowl, the side's first senior regional championship since 1989.

The 2001–02 marked a significant improvement in Smith's form, he made 841 first-class runs at an average of 64.69 and scored his first century. A successful tour of England with the West Indies A team followed, yielding 465 runs at an average of 46.50. In June 2005 Smith was named the 2004 First-Class Cricketer of the year at the WIPA awards. Since he compiled 842 runs, with four centuries, in eight matches at an average of 76.54 during the prior first class season.

During the 2012-13 Super 50 final Smith put on a 100 run opening partnership with Johnson Charles and eventually scored a match-winning 67 as the Windwards prevailed by 9 wickets over the Combined Campuses and Colleges. He was adjudged as the final's man of the match alongside allrounder Kenroy Peters. Smith was also the tournament's leading runscorer, notching 348 runs in eight matches at an average of 58.

Smith was part of the Windwards side which defeated Barbados to triumphantly claim the 2017-18 Super50 title. In June 2018, he was named the Best Regional Four-Day Cricketer of the Year at the annual Cricket West Indies' Awards. Smith then copped the Sir Viv Richards award as the leading run-scorer in the 2018–19 Regional Four Day Competition, with 745 runs in nine matches at an average of 43.82. In October 2019, he was named in the Windward Islands' squad for the 2019–20 Regional Super50 tournament.

== International cricket ==
Smith made the step up to international cricket when he was selected in the West Indies squad to face Australia in their 2003 tour. He made his Test debut in the first match of a four-Test series at Bourda, a score of 3 in the first innings was followed by 62 in the second, in a match that Australia went on to win by 9 wickets. Despite scoring a pair in the second Test, Smith retained his place for the rest of the series, making another half-century in the third Test. Smith also made his ODI debut on the same tour, he played the first three matches of the seven-ODI series, making a highest score of 26.

After being dropped from the West Indies team for their 2003–04 tours of Zimbabwe and South Africa, Smith regained his place for England's tour following an impressive domestic season, where he was the leading batsman in the Regional Four Day Competition, scoring 842 runs at an average of 76.54. His good form continued into the first Test of the series, where he made 108, described as a "gritty effort laced with occasional panache", his first Test century. Smith was unable to play in the final two matches of the four-Test series after fracturing his thumb while practising in the nets.

From May 2004 to June 2005 Smith played six Test matches, failing to reach a half-century in that time. During the 2004 tour of England he played three ODIs in the NatWest Series, where he made a highest score of 44, it was his last appearance for the ODI team until January 2007. Smith made a slight return to form in November 2005 against Australia in Brisbane. In a heavy defeat he was the only West Indies player to score a half century, making 88 in the first innings. Despite this Smith did not perform well in the rest of the series and again lost his place in the side.

=== Return to the side ===
Smith made his return to international cricket in January 2007 for the West Indies's tour of India, he played in three matches of the four-ODI series, making a highest score of 33. He retained his place in the side for the 2007 Cricket World Cup, he did not feature in the early stages of the tournament, but he played three matches in the Super Eight stage. He averaged 33.00 from his three innings, including a highest score of 61. Smith played no further part in the tournament as the West Indies were unable to advance to the semi-finals. In June 2007 Smith made his Twenty20 International debut, striking three sixes in an innings of 61. Later in the year he played both of the West Indies's two matches in the World Twenty20, making scores of 35 and 51. During the 2007 ICC World T20, he along with Chris Gayle also set the record for the highest ever opening partnership in the history of the tournament. His return to the Test side also came in 2007, he played in all four Tests of the series in England. It was a disappointing series from Smith who averaged 21.28 with a highest score of 42. This was followed by an even worse ODI series in Zimbabwe, where in four innings he only managed a highest score of 5. An improvement came on the tour to South Africa, he hit three sixes in scoring 91.

After playing in the Test series against Sri Lanka and Australia, where he made a highest score of 48 from eight innings, he was dropped from the side for the tour to New Zealand. However, following a career best performance for the Windward Islands, scoring 212 runs against Guyana, he was rewarded with a recall to the side for the home series against England. He played in all five Tests of the series and finished with an average of 27.50 with a highest score of 55, his only half-century. He also played both matches of the following Test series, again against England. Although he failed to reach a half-century in his four innings, his average of 26.25 was the third highest for the West Indies. The second Test against England was the last Test Smith played in 2009, however he featured in the home ODI series against Bangladesh, where he made a highest score of 65. He was playing with an under-strength West Indies team because of the West Indies Players' Association strike. He played only one international match in 2010, scoring 55 in a drawn Test against Sri Lanka. Despite not playing in an ODI since September 2009, Smith was included in the West Indies squad for the 2011 Cricket World Cup. He finished the tournament as the highest run-scorer for the West Indies; 300 runs at an average of 42.85 and a top score of 107, his maiden ODI century.

Following the World Cup, Smith was selected for the ODI and Test squads for Pakistan's tour. After disappointing Test and ODI series where, troubled by the spin bowling attack of Pakistan, Smith managed only 47 runs from five innings, he was dropped from the side.

Smith was recalled to the West Indies team for the tour of South Africa on 1 December 2014 to replace an injured Chris Gayle.

== Accolades ==
On 28 February 2019 the players pavilion at the Grenada National Cricket Stadium was renamed in Smith's honour.
