= Daniel St Clair =

Trinidadian cricketer (born 1987)

Personal information
- Born: 22 December 1987 (age 38); Trinidad and Tobago

Career statistics
Competition	FC
Matches	23
Runs scored	308
Batting average	11.84
100s/50s	0/0
Top score	31*
Balls bowled	2,628
Wickets	56
Bowling average	26.66
5 wickets in innings	1
10 wickets in match	0
Best bowling	6/62
Catches/stumpings	10/–
- Source: Cricinfo, 10 October 2021

Daniel St Clair (born 22 December 1987) is a Trinidad and Tobago cricketer. He made his first-class debut for Trinidad and Tobago in the 2014–15 Regional Four Day Competition on 28 November 2014.
