= Terrence Warde =

West Indian cricketer (born 1989)

Personal information
- Full name: Terrence Recaldo Warde
- Born: 2 January 1989 (age 37); Sandy Point, St Kitts
- Batting: Right-handed
- Bowling: Right-arm off-break

Domestic team information
- Years: Team
- 2007/08: St Kitts
- 2017/18-2023/24: Leeward Islands

Career statistics
Competition	FC	LA	T20
Matches	32	40	1
Runs scored	1,249	607	1
Batting average	26.57	21.67	1.00
100s/50s	0/5	0/1	0/0
Top score	83	71	1
Balls bowled	1,930	1,672	20
Wickets	31	25	0
Bowling average	30.67	45.64	–
5 wickets in innings	0	0	–
10 wickets in match	0	0	–
Best bowling	4/33	4/37	–
Catches/stumpings	29/–	17/–	1/–
- Source: Cricinfo, 8 August 2025

Terrence Warde (born 2 January 1989) is a West Indian cricketer from Saint Kitts. He made his first-class debut for the Leeward Islands in the 2017–18 Regional Four Day Competition on 26 October 2017. He made his List A debut for the Leeward Islands in the 2017–18 Regional Super50 on 2 February 2018.
