= Roland Cato =

West Indian cricketer (born 1997)

Personal information
- Full name: Roland Osbert Cato
- Born: 19 March 1997 (age 29); Saint Andrew, Grenada
- Batting: Right-handed
- Bowling: Right-arm medium
- Source: CricketArchive, 13 January 2016

Roland Osbert Cato (born 23 November 1997) is a Grenadian cricketer who has played for the West Indies under-19s team. He is a right-handed middle-order batsman.

Cato was born in Saint Andrew Parish, and has played for the Windward Islands at under-19 level, but is yet to make his senior debut. His debut for the West Indies under-19s came at the 2014–15 Regional Super50, where matches held List A status. Cato played in all three of his team's matches in the competition, against Trinidad and Tobago, the Leeward Islands, and Jamaica. His best performance came against the Leewards, when he scored 46 runs from 71 balls.

He made his first-class debut for the Windward Islands in the 2016–17 Regional Four Day Competition on 16 December 2016.

In June 2018, he was named in the Cricket West Indies B Team squad for the inaugural edition of the Global T20 Canada tournament. He made his Twenty20 debut on 12 September 2019, for the St Lucia Zouks, in the 2019 Caribbean Premier League. The following month, he was named in the West Indies Emerging Team for the 2019–20 Regional Super50 tournament.
