= Jason Dawes =

Jamaican cricketer

Personal information
- Full name: Jason Obrian Dawes
- Born: 27 December 1988 (age 37); Westmoreland Parish, Jamaica
- Batting: Right-handed
- Bowling: Right-arm fast

Domestic team information
- Years: Team
- 2009–2011,2013-present: Jamaica
- 2011–2013: Combined Campuses

Career statistics
| Competition | FC | List A | T20 |
|---|---|---|---|
| Matches | 29 | 6 | 1 |
| Runs scored | 351 | 22 | 2 |
| Batting average | 10.96 | 11.00 | 2.00 |
| 100s/50s | 0/0 | 0/0 | 0/0 |
| Top score | 33 | 13 | 2 |
| Balls bowled | 3469 | 228 | 12 |
| Wickets | 51 | 7 | 1 |
| Bowling average | 35.13 | 33.57 | 28.00 |
| 5 wickets in innings | 0 | 0 | 0 |
| 10 wickets in match | 0 | 0 | 0 |
| Best bowling | 4/57 | 3/42 | 1/28 |
| Catches/stumpings | 10/0 | 0/0 | 0/0 |
- Source: CricketArchive, 7 May 2017

Jason Obrian Dawes (born 27 December 1988) is a Jamaican cricketer who has played for both Jamaica and the Combined Campuses and Colleges in West Indian domestic cricket.

A right-arm fast bowler, Dawes played for the West Indies under-19s at the 2008 Under-19 World Cup in Malaysia. He took 11 wickets at the tournament to finish as his team's leading wicket-taker, including 4/25 against Papua New Guinea and 4/18 against Nepal. Dawes had also played for the West Indies under-19s at the 2007–08 KFC Cup, where matches held List A status. He made his first-class debut in March 2009, playing for Jamaica against Trinidad and Tobago in the 2008–09 Regional Four Day Competition. For the 2011–12 season, Dawes switched to the Combined Campuses, making his debut for them in the 2011–12 Regional Super50. He returned to Jamaica for the 2014–15 season.
