= Damion Jacobs =

Jamaican cricketer

Personal information
- Full name: Damion Kemar Jacobs
- Born: 15 January 1985 (age 41); Kingston, Jamaica
- Batting: Right-handed
- Bowling: Right-arm leg spin

Domestic team information
- Years: Team
- 2014–2018: Jamaica
- 2017–present: Barbados Tridents (squad no. 43)
- 2018-present: Leeward Islands

Career statistics
Competition	FC	LA	T20
Matches	54	30	2
Runs scored	912	176	8
Batting average	10.85	11.73	8.00
100s/50s	0/0	0/0	0/0
Top score	41	31	8
Balls bowled	10,268	1,540	12
Wickets	211	51	0
Bowling average	23.60	21.74	-
5 wickets in innings	15	3	0
10 wickets in match	5	0	0
Best bowling	8/47	6/34	-/-
Catches/stumpings	19/0	13/0	0/0
- Source: CricInfo, 10 October 2021

Damion Kemar Jacobs (born 15 February 1985) is a Jamaican cricketer who plays for the Jamaican national side in West Indian domestic cricket. He is a right-arm leg spin bowler.

From Kingston, Jacobs made his first-class debut for Jamaica during the 2013–14 Regional Four Day Competition. In only his fourth match, which was the competition's final, he took figures of 8/47 in the Windward Islands' first innings (and 10/122 for the match). Only four Jamaicans have taken better figures in an innings in first-class cricket. Jacobs continued his good form during the 2014–15 season, taking 48 wickets to finish as Jamaica's leading wicket-taker (and fifth in the competition). His season included figures of 5/27 and 7/54 against the Leeward Islands (in separate matches), 5/67 against Guyana, and 7/72 against the Windwards.

He was selected in the 2017 CPL player draft by the Barbados Tridents. He made his Twenty20 debut for Barbados Tridents in the 2017 Caribbean Premier League on 20 August 2017.

In May 2018, he was selected to play for the Leeward Islands national cricket team in the Professional Cricket League draft, ahead of the 2018–19 season. In June 2021, he was selected to take part in the Minor League Cricket tournament in the United States following the players' draft.
