= Akeem Saunders =

West Indian cricketer (born 1994)

Personal information
- Born: 17 June 1994 (age 32)

Domestic team information
- Years: Team
- 2013-present: Leeward Islands

Career statistics
Competition	FC	List A
Matches	25	19
Runs scored	858	262
Batting average	19.50	17.46
100s/50s	1/1	0/1
Top score	101	63*
Balls bowled	0	5
Wickets	-	0
Bowling average	-	-
5 wickets in innings	-	-
10 wickets in match	-	-
Best bowling	-/-	0/11
Catches/stumpings	13/0	12/0
- Source: Cricinfo, 9 October 2021

Akeem Saunders (born 17 June 1994) is a cricketer from Saint Kitts. He made his first-class debut for the Leeward Islands in the 2012–13 Regional Four Day Competition on 6 March 2013. In December 2017, he scored his maiden first-class century, batting for the Leeward Islands against Guyana in the 2017–18 Regional Four Day Competition.
