= 2014–15 Regional Super50 =

Cricket tournament

2014–15 NAGICO Super50
- Dates: 15 – 25 January 2015
- Administrator: WICB
- Cricket format: List A (50 overs)
- Tournament format(s): Group stage, finals
- Host: Trinidad and Tobago
- Champions: Trinidad and Tobago (11th title)
- Participants: 8
- Matches: 15
- Most runs: (Trinidad and Tobago) Jason Mohammed (203)
- Most wickets: (Trinidad and Tobago) Sunil Narine (12)

The 2014–15 NAGICO Super50 was the 41st season of the Regional Super50, the domestic limited-overs cricket competition for the countries of the West Indies Cricket Board (WICB). The competition was played as a standalone tournament, with all matches held in Trinidad and Tobago.

Eight teams contested the competition – the six regular teams of West Indian domestic cricket (Barbados, Guyana, Jamaica, the Leeward Islands, Trinidad and Tobago, and the Windward Islands), and two development teams (Combined Campuses and Colleges and the West Indies under-19 side). The early stages were interrupted by rain, with three matches abandoned in one group. Trinidad and Tobago were undefeated in the group stages, and were eventually joined in the final by Guyana. The final was played at Queen's Park Oval, Port of Spain, with the home team winning by 135 runs to claim its 11th domestic one-day title.

== Squads ==
Barbados	(Cricket West Indies) Combined Campuses	Guyana	Jamaica
Kevin Stoute (c); Tino Best; Kraigg Brathwaite; Shamarh Brooks; Roston Chase; Kyle Corbin; Shane Dowrich; Fidel Edwards; Kirk Edwards; Ryan Hinds; Shai Hope; Javon Searles; Jomel Warrican; Kenroy Williams	Chadwick Walton (c); Ryan Austin; Cassius Burton; Keron Cottoy; Kavem Hodge; Kyle Hope; Kyle Mayers; James McDonald; Paul Palmer; Christopher Powell; Rovman Powell; Kristopher Ramsaran; Shacaya Thomas; Kesrick Williams	Christopher Barnwell (c); Ronsford Beaton; Devendra Bishoo; Anthony Bramble; Shivnarine Chanderpaul; Rajendra Chandrika; Royston Crandon; Jonathan Foo; Trevon Griffith; Steven Jacobs; Veerasammy Permaul; Raymon Reifer; Vishaul Singh; Paul Wintz	Nikita Miller (c); David Bernard; Jermaine Blackwood; Nkruma Bonner; Gavon Brown; Dennis Bulli; John Campbell; Derval Green; Danza Hyatt; Damion Jacobs; Tamar Lambert; Andre McCarthy; Horace Miller; Marquino Mindley
Leeward Islands	Trinidad and Tobago	West Indies U19	Windward Islands
Devon Thomas (c); Shane Burton; Jason Campbell; Rahkeem Cornwall; Jahmar Hamilton; Montcin Hodge; Steve Liburd; Jeremiah Louis; Anthony Martin; Orlando Peters; Austin Richards; Lyndel Richardson; Gavin Tonge; Hayden Walsh, Jr.	Rayad Emrit (c); Darren Bravo; Kevon Cooper; Derone Davis; Akeal Hosein; Steven Katwaroo*; Imran Khan; Evin Lewis; Jason Mohammed; Sunil Narine; Ravi Rampaul; Marlon Richards; Jeremy Solozano; Nicholas Sookdeosingh	Shimron Hetmyer (c); Keacy Carty; Roland Cato; Tagenarine Chanderpaul; Jaleel Clarke; Michael Frew; Amir Jangoo; Alzarri Joseph; Ramaal Lewis; Keemo Paul; Akeel Seetal; Odean Smith; Shamar Springer; Chad Williams	Liam Sebastien (c); Sunil Ambris; Miles Bascombe; Alston Bobb; Johnson Charles; Craig Emmanuel; Taryck Gabriel; Delorn Johnson; Keddy Lesporis; Mervin Matthew; Kenroy Peters; Shane Shillingford; Devon Smith

- Note: Nicholas Pooran was originally named in Trinidad and Tobago's squad for the tournament, but was replaced by Steven Katwaroo after being injured in a road accident.

== Group stage ==
=== Zone A ===
Team	Pld	W	L	T	A	BP	Pts	NRR
Guyana	3	2	1	0	0	1	9	+1.053
(Cricket West Indies) Combined Campuses	3	1	0	0	2	0	8	+0.052
Windward Islands	3	1	1	0	1	0	6	–0.870
Barbados	3	0	2	0	1	0	2	–0.700

15 January 2015
Scorecard

Barbados	v	(Cricket West Indies) Combined Campuses

Match abandoned
National Cricket Centre, Couva

15 January 2015
Scorecard

Guyana; 227/6 (50 overs)	v	Windward Islands; 85 (33.4 overs)

Guyana won by 142 runs
Queen's Park Oval, Port of Spain
Player of the match: Veerasammy Permaul (Guy)

17 January 2015
Scorecard

Barbados; 168/4 (36 overs)	v	Guyana; 169/8 (35.2 overs)

Guyana won by 2 wickets
Queen's Park Oval, Port of Spain
Player of the match: Raymon Reifer (Guy)

- The match was reduced to 36 overs per side before the start of play.

17 January 2015
Scorecard

Combined Campuses (Cricket West Indies)	v	Windward Islands

Match abandoned
National Cricket Centre, Couva

19 January 2015
Scorecard

Windward Islands; 374/6 (50 overs)	v	Barbados; 319 (49 overs)

Windward Islands won by 55 runs
Shaw Park, Scarborough
Player of the match: Johnson Charles (Win)

- Johnson Charles of the Windward Islands scored 177 runs, a record for List A matches in the West Indies.

19 January 2015
Scorecard

Guyana; 171/9 (50 overs)	v	(Cricket West Indies) Combined Campuses; 173/9 (49.5 overs)

Combined Campuses won by 1 wicket
Queen's Park Oval, Port of Spain
Player of the match: Rovman Powell (CCC)

=== Zone B ===
Team	Pld	W	L	T	A	BP	Pts	NRR
Trinidad and Tobago	3	3	0	0	0	2	14	+0.771
Jamaica	3	2	1	0	0	2	10	+1.028
Leeward Islands	3	1	2	0	0	1	5	–0.481
West Indies U19	3	0	3	0	0	0	0	–1.529

16 January 2015
Scorecard

West Indies U19; 97/7 (21 overs)	v	Trinidad and Tobago; 101/5 (16 overs)

Trinidad and Tobago won by 5 wickets
Shaw Park, Scarborough
Player of the match: Ravi Rampaul (Tri)

- The match was reduced to 21 overs per side before the start of play.

16 January 2015
Scorecard

Leeward Islands; 115 (40.1 overs)	v	Jamaica; 119/1 (32.3 overs)

Jamaica won by 9 wickets
Queen's Park Oval, Port of Spain
Player of the match: Damion Jacobs (Jam)

18 January 2015
Scorecard

Trinidad and Tobago; 232 (49.3 overs)	v	Jamaica; 215 (49.1 overs)

Trinidad and Tobago won by 17 runs
Queen's Park Oval, Port of Spain
Player of the match: Rayad Emrit (Tri)

18 January 2015
Scorecard

Leeward Islands; 231/8 (50 overs)	v	West Indies U19; 183/9 (50 overs)

Leeward Islands won by 48 runs
National Cricket Centre, Couva
Player of the match: Rahkeem Cornwall (Lee)

20 January 2015
Scorecard

Trinidad and Tobago; 206 (50 overs)	v	Leeward Islands; 157 (45.4 overs)

Trinidad and Tobago won by 49 runs
Queen's Park Oval, Port of Spain
Player of the match: Kevon Cooper (Tri)

20 January 2015
Scorecard

West Indies U19; 137 (47 overs)	v	Jamaica; 139/1 (28.4 overs)

Jamaica won by 9 wickets
National Cricket Centre, Couva
Player of the match: John Campbell (Jam)

== Finals ==
=== Semi-finals ===
22 January 2015
Scorecard

Jamaica; 188/9 (50 overs)	v	Guyana; 189/4 (48.1 overs)

Guyana won by 6 wickets
Queen's Park Oval, Port of Spain
Player of the match: Shivnarine Chanderpaul (Guy)

23 January 2015
Scorecard

Trinidad and Tobago; 159 (31.3 overs)	v	(Cricket West Indies) Combined Campuses; 114 (30.4 overs)

Trinidad and Tobago won by 41 runs (D/L)
Queen's Park Oval, Port of Spain
Player of the match: Ravi Rampaul (Tri)

- The match was reduced to 32 overs per side, with Combined Campuses' target being 156 runs.

=== Final ===
25 January 2015
Scorecard

Trinidad and Tobago; 200/8 (50 overs)	v	Guyana; 65 (23.5 overs)

Trinidad and Tobago won by 135 runs
Queen's Park Oval, Port of Spain
Player of the match: Sunil Narine (Tri)

== Statistics ==
=== Most runs ===
The top five run scorers (total runs) are included in this table.

Player	Team	Runs	Inns	Avg	S/R	Highest	100s	50s
Jason Mohammed	Trinidad and Tobago	203	5	50.75	76.02	117*	1	0
Johnson Charles	Windward Islands	198	2	99.00	134.69	177	1	0
Shivnarine Chanderpaul	Guyana	154	5	38.50	56.00	98*	0	1
Nkruma Bonner	Jamaica	137	4	45.66	56.37	52*	0	2
John Campbell	Jamaica	134	4	44.66	59.82	61*	0	1

Source: CricketArchive

=== Most wickets ===
The top five wicket takers are listed in this table, listed by wickets taken and then by bowling average.

Player	Team	Overs	Wkts	Ave	SR	Econ	BBI
Sunil Narine	Trinidad and Tobago	39.0	12	7.25	19.50	2.23	6/9
Veerasammy Permaul	Guyana	47.0	11	13.36	25.63	3.12	4/12
Dwayne Bravo	Trinidad and Tobago	29.5	9	13.44	19.88	4.05	3/22
Devendra Bishoo	Guyana	42.4	9	14.88	28.44	3.14	3/33
Rayad Emrit	Trinidad and Tobago	26.0	8	15.12	19.50	4.65	5/56

Source: CricketArchive
