= Akeel =

Akeel is both a surname and a given name. Notable people with the name include:

- Shereef Akeel (born 1965), American lawyer
- Akeel Al Saffar, Iraqi politician
- Akeel Bilgrami (born 1950), Indian-born philosopher
- Akeel Eduardo (born 1993), Dutch basketball player
- Akeel Henry, Canadian record producer and recording engineer
- Akeel Inham (born 1996), Sri Lankan cricketer
- Akeel Lynch (born 1994), American football player
- Akeel Morris (born 1992), American baseball pitcher
- Akeel Seetal (born 1997), Indian cricketer
