= 2015 Royal Challengers Bangalore season =

Indian Premier League cricket team season

Royal Challengers Bangalore
2015 season
- Coach: Daniel Vettori
- Captain: Virat Kohli
- Ground(s): M. Chinnaswamy Stadium, Bangalore
- IPL: Semi-finalists
- Most runs: AB de Villiers (513)
- Most wickets: Yuzvendra Chahal (23)

Royal Challengers Bangalore is a franchise cricket team based in Bangalore, India, which plays in the Indian Premier League (IPL). They were one of the eight teams that competed in the 2015 Indian Premier League. They were captained by Virat Kohli. Royal Challengers Bangalore finished third in the IPL.

== Squad ==
- Players with international caps are listed in **bold**.

No.	Name	Nationality	Birth date	Batting style	Bowling style	Year signed	Salary	Notes
Batsmen
9	Mandeep Singh	India	18 December 1991 (aged 23)	Right-handed	Right arm medium	2015	Traded player	
11	**Rilee Rossouw**	South Africa	9 October 1989 (aged 25)	Left-handed	Right-arm off break	2014	₹50 lakh (US$80,000)	Overseas
18	**Virat Kohli**	India	5 November 1988 (aged 26)	Right-handed	Right-arm medium	2014	₹12.5 crore (US$1.95 million)	Captain
33	**Subramaniam Badrinath**	India	30 August 1980 (aged 34)	Right-handed	Right-arm off break	2015	₹30 lakh (US$50,000)	
53	**Nic Maddinson**	Australia	21 December 1991 (aged 23)	Left-handed	Left-arm orthodox	2014	₹50 lakh (US$80,000)	Overseas
97	Sarfaraz Khan	India	27 October 1997 (aged 17)	Right-handed	Right-arm off break	2015	₹50 lakh (US$80,000)	
333	**Chris Gayle**	Jamaica	21 September 1979 (aged 35)	Left-handed	Right-arm off break	2014	₹9.5 crore (US$1.48 million)	Overseas
451	Vijay Zol	India	23 November 1994 (aged 20)	Left-handed	Right-arm off break	2014	₹30 lakh (US$50,000)	
	Shishir Bhavane	India	21 September 1991 (aged 23)	Left-handed	Right-arm off break	2015	₹10 lakh (US$20,000)	
All-rounders
88	**Darren Sammy**	Saint Lucia	20 December 1983 (aged 31)	Right-handed	Right arm medium-fast	2015	₹2.8 crore (US$440,000)	Overseas
96	**David Wiese**	South Africa	18 May 1985 (aged 29)	Right-handed	Right arm medium-fast	2015	₹2.8 crore (US$440,000)	Overseas
	Jalaj Saxena	India	15 December 1986 (aged 28)	Right-handed	Right-arm off break	2015	₹10 lakh (US$20,000)	
Wicket-keepers
5	Yogesh Takawale	India	5 December 1984 (aged 30)	Right-handed		2014	₹10 lakh (US$20,000)	
17	**AB de Villiers**	South Africa	17 February 1984 (aged 31)	Right-handed	Right-arm medium	2014	₹7.5 crore (US$1.17 million)	Overseas
19	**Dinesh Karthik**	India	1 June 1985 (aged 29)	Right-handed		2015	₹10.5 crore (US$1.64 million)	
36	Manvinder Bisla	India	27 December 1984 (aged 30)	Right-handed		2015	Traded player	
Bowlers
2	**Ashok Dinda**	India	25 March 1984 (aged 31)	Right-handed	Right-arm medium-fast	2014	₹1.5 crore (US$230,000)	
3	Yuzvendra Chahal	India	23 July 1990 (aged 24)	Right-handed	Right-arm leg break	2014	₹10 lakh (US$20,000)	
6	Sreenath Aravind	India	8 April 1984 (aged 31)	Left-handed	Left-arm medium-fast	2015	Replacement signing	
13	Harshal Patel	India	23 November 1990 (aged 24)	Right-handed	Right-arm medium-fast	2014	₹40 lakh (US$60,000)	
21	Iqbal Abdulla	India	2 December 1989 (aged 25)	Left-handed	Slow left-arm orthodox	2015	Traded player	
23	Abu Nechim	India	5 November 1988 (aged 26)	Right-handed	Right-arm medium-fast	2014	₹30 lakh (US$50,000)	
45	**Varun Aaron**	India	29 October 1989 (aged 25)	Right-handed	Right-arm fast	2014	₹2 crore (US$310,000)	
56	**Mitchell Starc**	Australia	30 January 1990 (aged 25)	Left-handed	Left-arm fast	2014	₹5 crore (US$780,000)	Overseas
77	**Sean Abbott**	Australia	29 February 1992 (aged 23)	Right-handed	Right-arm fast-medium	2015	₹1 crore (US$160,000)	Overseas
	Sandeep Warrier	India	4 April 1991 (aged 24)	Right-handed	Right-arm fast-medium	2014	₹10 lakh (US$20,000)	
	**Adam Milne** (Note: Ruled out of the season with an injury)	New Zealand	13 April 1992 (aged 22)	Right-handed	Right-arm fast	2015	₹70 lakh (US$110,000)	Overseas

== Indian Premier League season ==
=== Standings ===
Royal Challengers Bangalore finished third in the league stage of IPL 2015.

Pos	Team	Pld	W	L	NR	Pts	NRR
1	Chennai Super Kings (R)	14	9	5	0	18	0.709
2	Mumbai Indians (C)	14	8	6	0	16	−0.043
3	Royal Challengers Bangalore (3)	14	7	5	2	16	1.037
4	Rajasthan Royals (4)	14	7	5	2	16	0.062
5	Kolkata Knight Riders	14	7	6	1	15	0.253
6	Sunrisers Hyderabad	14	7	7	0	14	−0.239
7	Delhi Daredevils	14	5	8	1	11	−0.049
8	Kings XI Punjab	14	3	11	0	6	−1.436

- Top 4 teams were qualified for the playoffs
- advanced to the Qualifier
- advanced to the Eliminator

("C" refers to the "Champions" of the Tournament. 'R'(2nd Position), '3' and '4' are the positions of the respective teams in the tournament.)

=== Match log ===
No.	Date	Opponent	Venue	Result	Scorecard
1	11 April 2015	Kolkata Knight Riders	Kolkata	Won by 3 wickets, MoM – Chris Gayle 96 (56)	Scorecard
2	13 April 2015	Sunrisers Hyderabad	Bengaluru	Lost by 8 wickets	Scorecard
3	19 April 2015	Mumbai Indians	Bengaluru	Lost by 18 runs	Scorecard
4	22 April 2015	Chennai Super Kings	Bengaluru	Lost by 27 runs	Scorecard
5	24 April 2015	Rajasthan Royals	Ahmedabad	Won by 9 wickets, MoM – Mitchell Starc 3/22 (4 overs)	Scorecard
6	26 April 2015	Delhi Daredevils	Delhi	Won by 10 wickets, MoM – Varun Aaron 2/24 (4 overs)	Scorecard
7	29 April 2015	Rajasthan Royals	Bengaluru	No result	Scorecard
8	2 May 2015	Kolkata Knight Riders	Bengaluru	Won by 7 wickets, MoM – Mandeep Singh 45* (18)	Scorecard
9	4 May 2015	Chennai Super Kings	Chennai	Lost by 24 runs	Scorecard
10	6 May 2015	Kings XI Punjab	Bengaluru	Won by 138 runs, MoM – Chris Gayle 117 (57)	Scorecard
11	10 May 2015	Mumbai Indians	Mumbai	Won by 39 runs, MoM – AB de Villiers 133* (59)	Scorecard
12	13 May 2015	Kings XI Punjab	Mohali	Lost by 22 runs	Scorecard
13	15 May 2015	Sunrisers Hyderabad	Hyderabad	Won by 6 wickets (D/L), MoM- Virat Kohli 44* (19)	Scorecard
14	17 May 2015	Delhi Daredevils	Bengaluru	No result	Scorecard
Eliminator	20 May 2015	Rajasthan Royals	Pune	Won by 71 runs, MoM – AB de Villiers 66 (38)	Scorecard
Qualifier 2	22 May 2015	Chennai Super Kings	Ranchi	Lost by 3 wickets	Scorecard
Overall record: 8–6. Failed to advance.
