= 2015 Sunrisers Hyderabad season =

Indian Premier League cricket team season

Sunrisers Hyderabad
2015 season
- Coach: Tom Moody
- Captain: David Warner
- Ground(s): Rajiv Gandhi International Cricket Stadium, Hyderabad (Capacity: 55,000); ACA-VDCA Stadium, Visakhapatnam (Capacity: 38,000)
- IPL: Group Stage (6th)
- Most runs: David Warner (562)
- Most wickets: Bhuvneshwar Kumar (18)
- Most catches: David Warner (8)
- Most wicket-keeping dismissals: Naman Ojha (7)

Sunrisers Hyderabad (SRH) are a franchise cricket team based in Hyderabad, India, which plays in the Indian Premier League (IPL). They were one of the eight teams that are competing in the 2015 Indian Premier League. This was their third outing in IPL. The team was being captained by David Warner and coached by Tom Moody with Muttiah Muralitharan as their bowling coach and VVS Laxman as the mentor for this team.

The Sunrisers started their campaign against Chennai Super Kings on April 11, 2015, at Chennai on a losing note and failed to qualify for Play-Offs finishing 6th at the end of the tournament. David Warner won the Orange Cap by scoring 562 runs in this IPL.

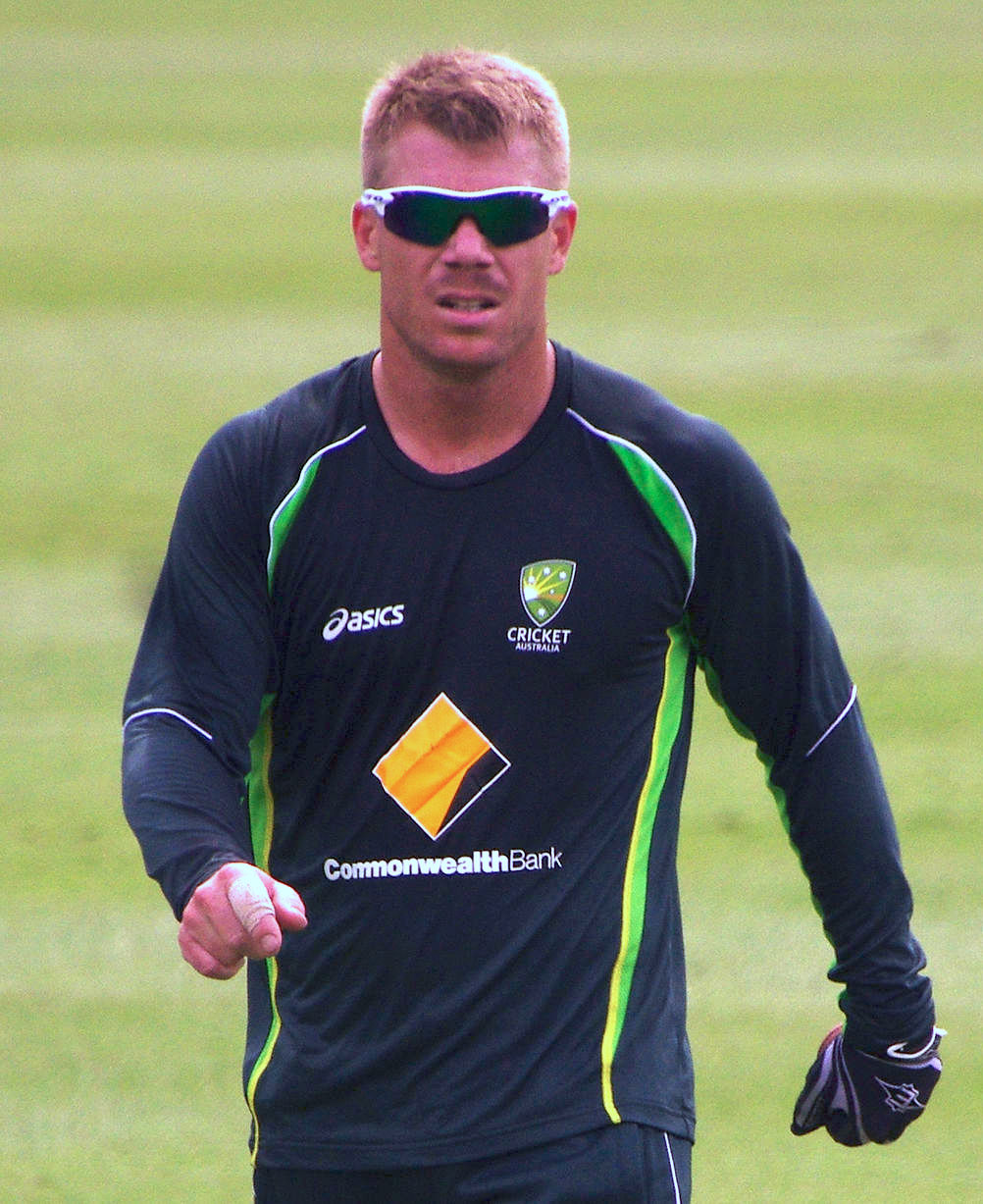
David Warner appointed as captain for SRH in IPL 2015

== Background ==
They appointed Muttiah Muralitharan as their bowling coach for 2015 season

ACA-VDCA Stadium which is located in Visakhapatnam, Andhra Pradesh is selected as the Secondary Home Ground for the Sunrisers Hyderabad. It has a seating capacity of 38,000. Sunrisers Hyderabad played their first 3 home games at this ground.

== Administration and support staff ==
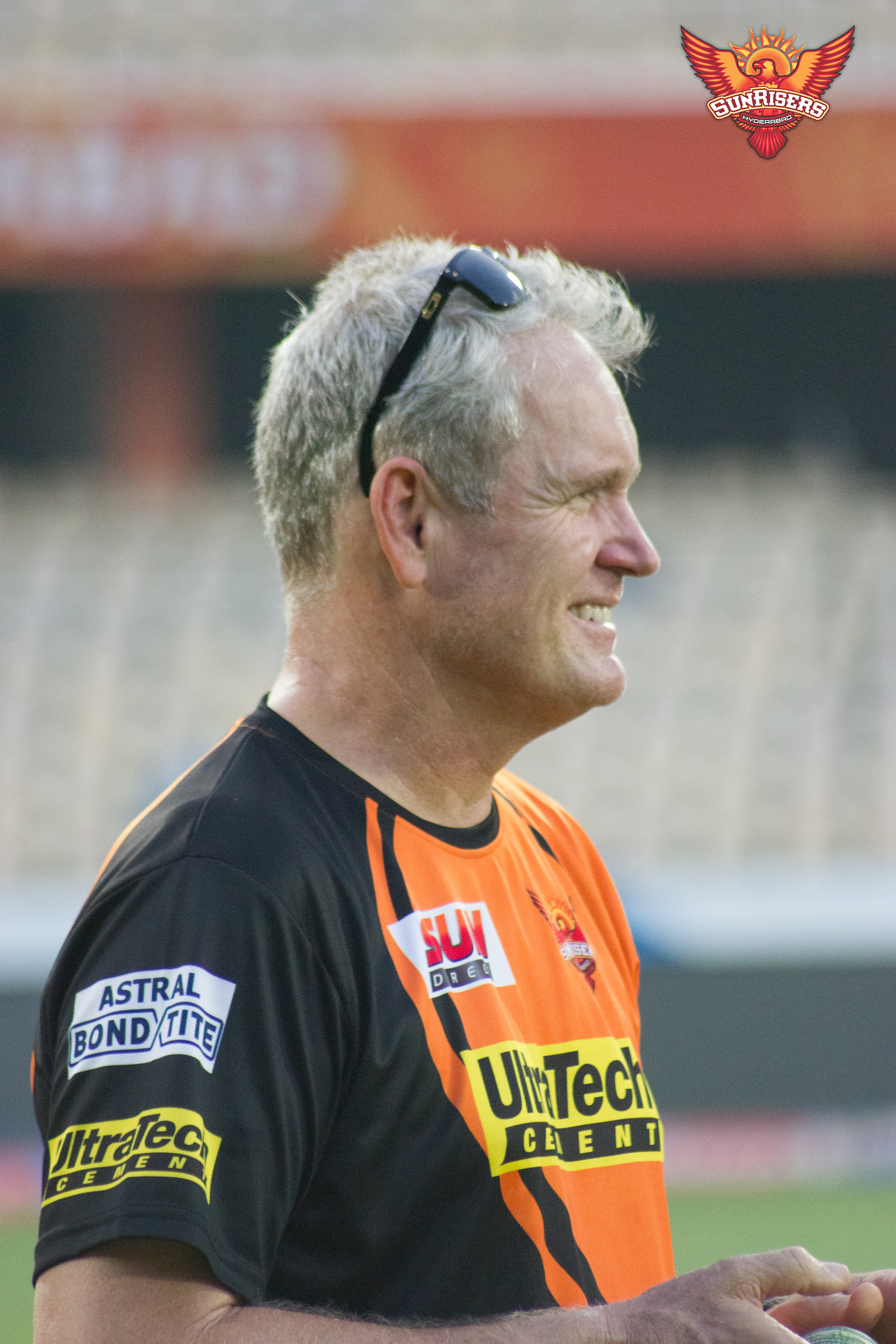
Tom Moody

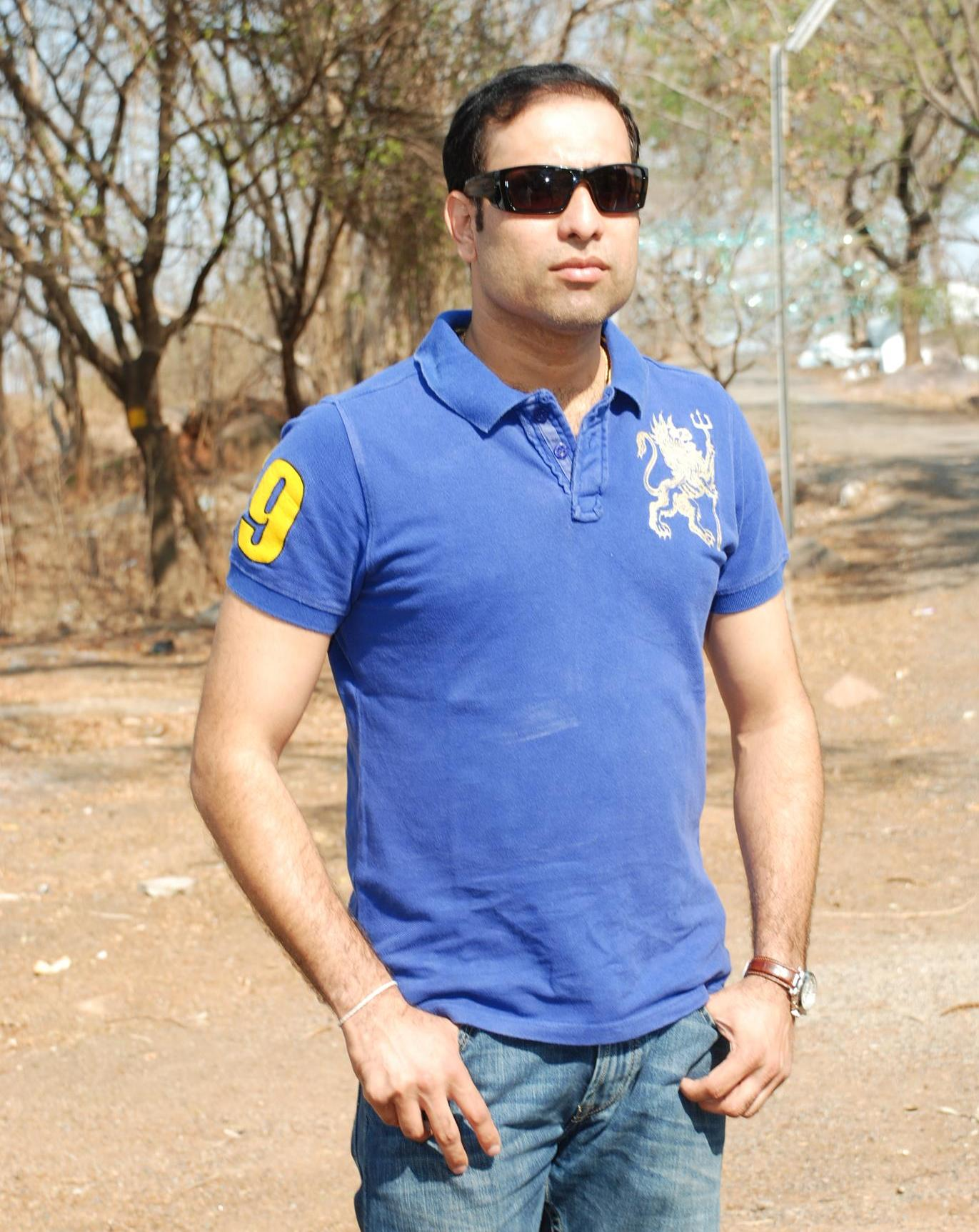
VVS Laxman

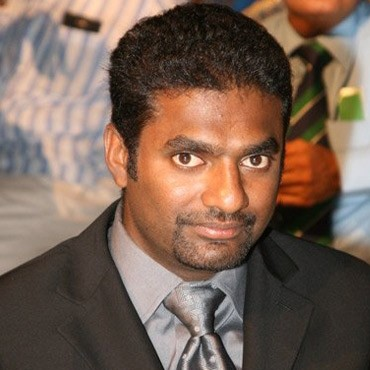
Muralitharan

- Owner – Kalanithi Maran (Sun Network)
- Head coach – Tom Moody
- Assistant coach – Simon Helmot
- Bowling coach – Muttiah Muralitharan
- Mentor – VVS Laxman & Kris Srikkanth
Source :

== Kit manufacturers and sponsors ==
Kit Manufacturers	Shirt Sponsor (Chest)	Shirt Sponsor (Back)	Chest Branding
TYKA	Red FM 93.5	Idea	Justdial

Source :

== Players auction ==
The players auction for the 2015 Indian Premier League held on 16 February 2015. All eight franchises had participated in the auction. SRH has retained 13 players and released 11 players from the previous season. As a result of this retention the team had an auction purse of Rs 208.5 million. Added 10 players to the team. Later, there has been a replacement in the team with Bipul Sharma filling in for Laxmi Ratan Shukla.

Retained Players: David Warner, Shikhar Dhawan, Ashish Reddy, Bhuvneshwar Kumar, Chama Milind, Dale Steyn, Ishant Sharma, Karn Sharma, K. L. Rahul, Moises Henriques, Naman Ojha, Parvez Rasool, Ricky Bhui

Released Players: Aaron Finch, Amit Mishra, Amit Paunikar, Brendan Taylor, Darren Sammy, Irfan Pathan, Jason Holder, Manprit Juneja, Prasanth Parameswaran, Anirudha Srikkanth, Venugopal Rao

Added Players: Trent Boult, Praveen Kumar, Eoin Morgan, Ravi Bopara, Kane Williamson, ~~Laxmi Ratan Shukla~~, Padmanabhan Prasanth, Hanuma Vihari, Siddarth Kaul, ~~Kevin Pietersen~~

Replacement Players: Bipul Sharma

== Squad ==
- Players with international caps are listed in **bold**.
- **Signed Year** denotes year from which player is associated with the Sunrisers Hyderabad

Name	Nationality	Birth date	Batting style	Bowling style	Year signed	Notes
Batsmen
Ricky Bhui	India	29 November 1996 (aged 18)	Right-handed	Right-arm leg break	2014	
**Shikhar Dhawan**	India	5 December 1985 (aged 29)	Left-handed	Right-arm off break	2013	
**Eoin Morgan**	England	10 September 1986 (aged 28)	Left-handed	Right-arm medium	2015	Overseas. Unavailable due to national commitments.
**Kevin Pietersen**	England	27 June 1980 (aged 34)	Right-handed	Right-arm off break	2015	Overseas. Withdrew due to other reasons.
Hanuma Vihari	India	13 October 1993 (aged 21)	Right-handed	Right-arm leg break	2015	
**David Warner**	Australia	27 October 1986 (aged 28)	Left-handed	Right-arm leg break	2014	Captain, Overseas.
**Kane Williamson**	New Zealand	8 August 1990 (aged 24)	Right-handed	Right-arm off break	2015	Overseas.
All-rounders
**Ravi Bopara**	England	4 May 1985 (aged 29)	Right-handed	Right-arm medium	2015	Overseas. Unavailable due to national commitments.
**Moisés Henriques**	Australia	1 February 1987 (aged 28)	Right-handed	Right-arm medium-fast	2014	Overseas.
**Parvez Rasool**	India	13 February 1989 (aged 26)	Right-handed	Right-arm off break	2014	
Ashish Reddy	India	24 February 1991 (aged 24)	Right-handed	Right-arm medium	2014	
Bipul Sharma	India	28 September 1983 (aged 31)	Left-handed	Slow left-arm orthodox	2015	Replacement to LR Shukla.
**Laxmi Ratan Shukla**	India	6 May 1981 (aged 33)	Right-handed	Right-arm medium	2015	Withdrew due to Injury.
Wicket-keepers
**Naman Ojha**	India	20 July 1983 (aged 31)	Right-handed	Right-arm medium	2014	
**K. L. Rahul**	India	18 April 1992 (aged 22)	Right-handed	Right-arm Wicket keeper	2014	
Bowlers
**Trent Boult**	New Zealand	22 July 1989 (aged 25)	Right-handed	Left-arm medium-fast	2015	Overseas.
Siddarth Kaul	India	19 May 1990 (aged 24)	Right-handed	Right-arm medium-fast	2015	
**Bhuvneshwar Kumar**	India	5 February 1990 (aged 25)	Right-handed	Right-arm medium-fast	2014	
**Praveen Kumar**	India	2 October 1986 (aged 28)	Right-handed	Right-arm medium-fast	2015	
Chama Milind	India	4 September 1994 (aged 20)	Left-handed	Left-arm medium-fast	2014	
Padmanabhan Prasanth	India	22 May 1985 (aged 29)	Left-handed	Slow left-arm orthodox	2015	
**Ishant Sharma**	India	2 September 1988 (aged 26)	Right-handed	Right-arm medium-fast	2013	
**Karn Sharma**	India	23 October 1987 (aged 27)	Left-handed	Right-arm leg break	2013	
**Dale Steyn**	South Africa	27 June 1983 (aged 31)	Right-handed	Right-arm fast	2013	Overseas.

== Season overview ==
=== Standings ===
Pos	Team	Pld	W	L	NR	Pts	NRR
1	Chennai Super Kings (R)	14	9	5	0	18	0.709
2	Mumbai Indians (C)	14	8	6	0	16	−0.043
3	Royal Challengers Bangalore (3)	14	7	5	2	16	1.037
4	Rajasthan Royals (4)	14	7	5	2	16	0.062
5	Kolkata Knight Riders	14	7	6	1	15	0.253
6	Sunrisers Hyderabad	14	7	7	0	14	−0.239
7	Delhi Daredevils	14	5	8	1	11	−0.049
8	Kings XI Punjab	14	3	11	0	6	−1.436

- Top 4 teams were qualified for the playoffs
- advanced to the Qualifier
- advanced to the Eliminator

("C" refers to the "Champions" of the Tournament. 'R'(2nd Position), '3' and '4' are the positions of the respective teams in the tournament.)

=== Results by match ===
Round	1	2	3	4	5	6	7	8	9	10	11	12	13	14
Ground	A	A	H	H	H	A	A	H	A	A	A	H	H	H
Result	L	W	L	L	W	L	W	W	L	W	W	W	L	L

Source: Fixtures
A = Away; H = Home; W = Win; D = Draw; L = Loss

== Fixtures ==
=== League stage ===
11 April	(H) Chennai Super Kings; 209/4 (20 overs)	v	Sunrisers Hyderabad; 164/6 (20 overs)	Chennai Super Kings won by 45 runs
16:00 (D/N); Scorecard	(H) Chennai Super Kings; 209/4 (20 overs)	v	Sunrisers Hyderabad; 164/6 (20 overs)	M A Chidambaram Stadium, Chennai; Umpires: Richard Illingworth (Eng) and Vineet Kulkarni (Ind); Player of the match: Brendon McCullum (CSK)
16:00 (D/N); Scorecard	Brendon McCullum 100* (56); Trent Boult 1/34 (4 overs)		David Warner 53 (42); Dwayne Bravo 2/25 (4 overs)	M A Chidambaram Stadium, Chennai; Umpires: Richard Illingworth (Eng) and Vineet Kulkarni (Ind); Player of the match: Brendon McCullum (CSK)
Chennai Super Kings won the toss and elected to bat; Kane Williamson and Trent Boult made their IPL debuts				M A Chidambaram Stadium, Chennai; Umpires: Richard Illingworth (Eng) and Vineet Kulkarni (Ind); Player of the match: Brendon McCullum (CSK)

13 April	(H) Royal Challengers Bangalore; 166 (19.5 overs)	v	Sunrisers Hyderabad; 172/2 (17.2 overs)	Sunrisers Hyderabad won by 8 wickets
20:00 (D/N); Scorecard	(H) Royal Challengers Bangalore; 166 (19.5 overs)	v	Sunrisers Hyderabad; 172/2 (17.2 overs)	M Chinnaswamy Stadium, Bangalore; Umpires: Rajesh Deshpande (Ind) and Richard Illingworth (Eng); Player of the match: David Warner (SRH)
20:00 (D/N); Scorecard	AB de Villiers 46 (28); Trent Boult 3/36 (4 overs)		David Warner 57 (27); Yuzvendra Chahal 2/28 (4 overs)	M Chinnaswamy Stadium, Bangalore; Umpires: Rajesh Deshpande (Ind) and Richard Illingworth (Eng); Player of the match: David Warner (SRH)
Sunrisers Hyderabad won the toss and elected to field				M Chinnaswamy Stadium, Bangalore; Umpires: Rajesh Deshpande (Ind) and Richard Illingworth (Eng); Player of the match: David Warner (SRH)

16 April	(H) Sunrisers Hyderabad; 127/5 (20 overs)	v	Rajasthan Royals; 131/4 (20 overs)	Rajasthan Royals won by 6 wickets
20:00 (D/N); Scorecard	(H) Sunrisers Hyderabad; 127/5 (20 overs)	v	Rajasthan Royals; 131/4 (20 overs)	ACA-VDCA Stadium, Visakhapatnam; Umpires: Pashchim Pathak (Ind) and S Ravi (Ind); Player of the match: Ajinkya Rahane (RR)
20:00 (D/N); Scorecard	Eoin Morgan 27 (30); Dhawal Kulkarni 2/9 (3 overs)		Ajinkya Rahane 62 (56); Ravi Bopara 2/18 (4 overs)	ACA-VDCA Stadium, Visakhapatnam; Umpires: Pashchim Pathak (Ind) and S Ravi (Ind); Player of the match: Ajinkya Rahane (RR)
Rajasthan Royals won the toss and elected to field				ACA-VDCA Stadium, Visakhapatnam; Umpires: Pashchim Pathak (Ind) and S Ravi (Ind); Player of the match: Ajinkya Rahane (RR)

18 April	Delhi Daredevils; 167/4 (20 overs)	v	Sunrisers Hyderabad (H); 163/8 (20 overs)	Delhi Daredevils won by 4 runs
16:00 (D/N); Scorecard	Delhi Daredevils; 167/4 (20 overs)	v	Sunrisers Hyderabad (H); 163/8 (20 overs)	ACA-VDCA Stadium, Visakhapatnam; Umpires: Pashchim Pathak (Ind) and S Ravi (Ind); Player of the match: JP Duminy (DD)
16:00 (D/N); Scorecard	Shreyas Iyer 60 (40); Bhuvneshwar Kumar 1/21 (4 overs)		Ravi Bopara 41 (30); JP Duminy 4/17 (3 overs)	ACA-VDCA Stadium, Visakhapatnam; Umpires: Pashchim Pathak (Ind) and S Ravi (Ind); Player of the match: JP Duminy (DD)
Delhi Daredevils won the toss and elected to bat				ACA-VDCA Stadium, Visakhapatnam; Umpires: Pashchim Pathak (Ind) and S Ravi (Ind); Player of the match: JP Duminy (DD)

22 April	(H) Sunrisers Hyderabad; 176/4 (20 overs)	v	Kolkata Knight Riders; 101/4 (12 overs)	Sunrisers Hyderabad won by 16 runs (D/L method)
16:00 (D/N); Scorecard	(H) Sunrisers Hyderabad; 176/4 (20 overs)	v	Kolkata Knight Riders; 101/4 (12 overs)	ACA-VDCA Stadium, Visakhapatnam; Umpires: Richard Illingworth (Eng) and Vineet Kulkarni (Ind); Player of the match: David Warner (SRH)
16:00 (D/N); Scorecard	David Warner 91 (55); Morne Morkel 2/31 (4 overs)		Robin Uthappa 34 (21); Ravi Bopara 1/7 (1 over)	ACA-VDCA Stadium, Visakhapatnam; Umpires: Richard Illingworth (Eng) and Vineet Kulkarni (Ind); Player of the match: David Warner (SRH)
Kolkata Knight Riders won the toss and elected to field; Due to rain, Kolkata's target was adjusted to 118 runs from 12 overs via Duckworth-Lewis method; David Warner made the highest score by a Hyderabad batsman. David Warner and Shikhar Dhawan's 130 run partnership was the highest partnership for any wicket by Hyderabad.				ACA-VDCA Stadium, Visakhapatnam; Umpires: Richard Illingworth (Eng) and Vineet Kulkarni (Ind); Player of the match: David Warner (SRH)

25 April	(H) Mumbai Indians; 157/8 (20 overs)	v	Sunrisers Hyderabad; 137/8 (20 overs)	Mumbai Indians won by 20 runs
16:00 (D/N); Scorecard	(H) Mumbai Indians; 157/8 (20 overs)	v	Sunrisers Hyderabad; 137/8 (20 overs)	Wankhede Stadium, Mumbai; Umpires: Kumar Dharmasena (SL) and Chris Gaffaney (NZ); Player of the match: Lasith Malinga (MI)
16:00 (D/N); Scorecard	Lendl Simmons 51 (42); Bhuvneshwar Kumar 3/26 (4 overs)		Shikhar Dhawan 42 (29); Lasith Malinga 4/23 (4 overs)	Wankhede Stadium, Mumbai; Umpires: Kumar Dharmasena (SL) and Chris Gaffaney (NZ); Player of the match: Lasith Malinga (MI)
Mumbai Indians won the toss and elected to bat				Wankhede Stadium, Mumbai; Umpires: Kumar Dharmasena (SL) and Chris Gaffaney (NZ); Player of the match: Lasith Malinga (MI)

27 April	Sunrisers Hyderabad; 150/6 (20 overs)	v	Kings XI Punjab (H); 130/9 (20 overs)	Sunrisers Hyderabad won by 20 runs
20:00 (D/N); Scorecard	Sunrisers Hyderabad; 150/6 (20 overs)	v	Kings XI Punjab (H); 130/9 (20 overs)	Punjab Cricket Association Stadium, Mohali; Umpires: Kumar Dharmasena (SL) and Chris Gaffaney (NZ); Player of the match: Trent Boult (SRH)
20:00 (D/N); Scorecard	David Warner 58 (41); Axar Patel 2/25 (4 overs)		Wriddhiman Saha 42 (33); Trent Boult 3/19 (4 overs)	Punjab Cricket Association Stadium, Mohali; Umpires: Kumar Dharmasena (SL) and Chris Gaffaney (NZ); Player of the match: Trent Boult (SRH)
Kings XI Punjab won the toss and elected to field				Punjab Cricket Association Stadium, Mohali; Umpires: Kumar Dharmasena (SL) and Chris Gaffaney (NZ); Player of the match: Trent Boult (SRH)

2 May	(H) Sunrisers Hyderabad; 192/7 (20 overs)	v	Chennai Super Kings; 170/6 (20 overs)	Sunrisers Hyderabad won by 22 runs
20:00 (D/N); Scorecard	(H) Sunrisers Hyderabad; 192/7 (20 overs)	v	Chennai Super Kings; 170/6 (20 overs)	Rajiv Gandhi International Cricket Stadium, Hyderabad; Umpires: Anil Chaudhary (Ind) and Krishnamachari Srinivasan (Ind); Player of the match: David Warner (SRH)
20:00 (D/N); Scorecard	David Warner 61 (28); Dwayne Bravo 3/25 (4 overs)		Faf du Plessis 33 (22); Moises Henriques 2/20 (4 overs)	Rajiv Gandhi International Cricket Stadium, Hyderabad; Umpires: Anil Chaudhary (Ind) and Krishnamachari Srinivasan (Ind); Player of the match: David Warner (SRH)
Chennai Super Kings won the toss and elected to field				Rajiv Gandhi International Cricket Stadium, Hyderabad; Umpires: Anil Chaudhary (Ind) and Krishnamachari Srinivasan (Ind); Player of the match: David Warner (SRH)

4 May	(H) Kolkata Knight Riders; 167/7 (20 overs)	v	Sunrisers Hyderabad; 132/9 (20 overs)	Kolkata Knight Riders won by 35 runs
20:00 (D/N); Scorecard	(H) Kolkata Knight Riders; 167/7 (20 overs)	v	Sunrisers Hyderabad; 132/9 (20 overs)	Eden Gardens, Kolkata; Umpires: Anil Chaudhary (Ind) and Marais Erasmus (SA); Player of the match: Umesh Yadav (KKR)
20:00 (D/N); Scorecard	Manish Pandey 33 (26); Karn Sharma 2/29 (4 overs)		Moises Henriques 41 (33); Brad Hogg 2/17 (4 overs)	Eden Gardens, Kolkata; Umpires: Anil Chaudhary (Ind) and Marais Erasmus (SA); Player of the match: Umesh Yadav (KKR)
Sunrisers Hyderabad won the toss and elected to field				Eden Gardens, Kolkata; Umpires: Anil Chaudhary (Ind) and Marais Erasmus (SA); Player of the match: Umesh Yadav (KKR)

7 May	Sunrisers Hyderabad; 201/4 (20 overs)	v	Rajasthan Royals (H); 194/7 (20 overs)	Sunrisers Hyderabad won by 7 runs
16:00 (D/N); Scorecard	Sunrisers Hyderabad; 201/4 (20 overs)	v	Rajasthan Royals (H); 194/7 (20 overs)	Brabourne Stadium, Mumbai; Umpires: Johanes Cloete (SA) and Chettithody Shamshuddin (Ind); Player of the match: Eoin Morgan (SRH)
16:00 (D/N); Scorecard	Eoin Morgan 63 (28); Shane Watson 2/36 (3 overs)		Steve Smith 68 (40); Bhuvneshwar Kumar 3/44 (4 overs)	Brabourne Stadium, Mumbai; Umpires: Johanes Cloete (SA) and Chettithody Shamshuddin (Ind); Player of the match: Eoin Morgan (SRH)
Rajasthan Royals won the toss and elected to field				Brabourne Stadium, Mumbai; Umpires: Johanes Cloete (SA) and Chettithody Shamshuddin (Ind); Player of the match: Eoin Morgan (SRH)

9 May	Sunrisers Hyderabad; 163/4 (20 overs)	v	Delhi Daredevils (H); 157/4 (20 overs)	Sunrisers Hyderabad won by 6 runs
20:00 (D/N); Scorecard	Sunrisers Hyderabad; 163/4 (20 overs)	v	Delhi Daredevils (H); 157/4 (20 overs)	Chhattisgarh International Cricket Stadium, Raipur; Umpires: Vineet Kulkarni (Ind) and S Ravi (Ind); Player of the match: Moises Henriques (SRH)
20:00 (D/N); Scorecard	Moises Henriques 74* (46); Nathan Coulter-Nile 2/25 (4 overs)		Kedar Jadhav 63 (34); Karn Sharma 2/12 (3 overs)	Chhattisgarh International Cricket Stadium, Raipur; Umpires: Vineet Kulkarni (Ind) and S Ravi (Ind); Player of the match: Moises Henriques (SRH)
Sunrisers Hyderabad won the toss and elected to bat; Jayant Yadav made his IPL debut				Chhattisgarh International Cricket Stadium, Raipur; Umpires: Vineet Kulkarni (Ind) and S Ravi (Ind); Player of the match: Moises Henriques (SRH)

11 May	(H) Sunrisers Hyderabad; 185/5 (20 overs)	v	Kings XI Punjab; 180/7 (20 overs)	Sunrisers Hyderabad won 5 runs
20:00 (D/N); Scorecard	(H) Sunrisers Hyderabad; 185/5 (20 overs)	v	Kings XI Punjab; 180/7 (20 overs)	Rajiv Gandhi International Cricket Stadium, Hyderabad; Umpires: Anil Chaudhary (Ind) and Kumar Dharmasena (SL); Player of the match: David Warner (SRH)
20:00 (D/N); Scorecard	David Warner 81 (52); Beuran Hendricks 2/40 (4 overs)		David Miller 89* (44); Moises Henriques 3/16 (4 overs)	Rajiv Gandhi International Cricket Stadium, Hyderabad; Umpires: Anil Chaudhary (Ind) and Kumar Dharmasena (SL); Player of the match: David Warner (SRH)
Sunrisers Hyderabad won the toss and elected to bat				Rajiv Gandhi International Cricket Stadium, Hyderabad; Umpires: Anil Chaudhary (Ind) and Kumar Dharmasena (SL); Player of the match: David Warner (SRH)

15 May	(H) Sunrisers Hyderabad; 135/3 (11 overs)	v	Royal Challengers Bangalore; 83/4 (5.5 overs)	Royal Challengers Bangalore won by 6 wickets (D/L method)
20:00 (D/N); Scorecard	(H) Sunrisers Hyderabad; 135/3 (11 overs)	v	Royal Challengers Bangalore; 83/4 (5.5 overs)	Rajiv Gandhi International Cricket Stadium, Hyderabad; Umpires: Anil Chaudhary (Ind) and Kumar Dharmasena (SL); Player of the match: Virat Kohli (RCB)
20:00 (D/N); Scorecard	Moises Henriques 57 (22); David Wiese 2/20 (2 overs)		Virat Kohli 44* (19); Moises Henriques 2/3 (1 over)	Rajiv Gandhi International Cricket Stadium, Hyderabad; Umpires: Anil Chaudhary (Ind) and Kumar Dharmasena (SL); Player of the match: Virat Kohli (RCB)
Sunrisers Hyderabad won the toss and elected to bat; Match reduced to 11 overs per side due to rain; Due to rain, Bangalore's target was adjusted to 81 runs from 6 overs via Duckworth-Lewis method				Rajiv Gandhi International Cricket Stadium, Hyderabad; Umpires: Anil Chaudhary (Ind) and Kumar Dharmasena (SL); Player of the match: Virat Kohli (RCB)

17 May	(H) Sunrisers Hyderabad; 113 (20 overs)	v	Mumbai Indians; 114/1 (13.5 overs)	Mumbai Indians won by 9 wickets
20:00 (D/N); Scorecard	(H) Sunrisers Hyderabad; 113 (20 overs)	v	Mumbai Indians; 114/1 (13.5 overs)	Rajiv Gandhi International Cricket Stadium, Hyderabad; Umpires: Chris Gaffaney (NZ) and Krishnaraj Srinath (Ind); Player of the match: Mitchell McClenaghan (MI)
20:00 (D/N); Scorecard	K. L. Rahul 25 (24); Mitchell McClenaghan 3/16 (4 overs)		Parthiv Patel 51* (37); Karn Sharma 1/38 (2.5 overs)	Rajiv Gandhi International Cricket Stadium, Hyderabad; Umpires: Chris Gaffaney (NZ) and Krishnaraj Srinath (Ind); Player of the match: Mitchell McClenaghan (MI)
Sunrisers Hyderabad won the toss and elected to bat				Rajiv Gandhi International Cricket Stadium, Hyderabad; Umpires: Chris Gaffaney (NZ) and Krishnaraj Srinath (Ind); Player of the match: Mitchell McClenaghan (MI)

== Statistics ==
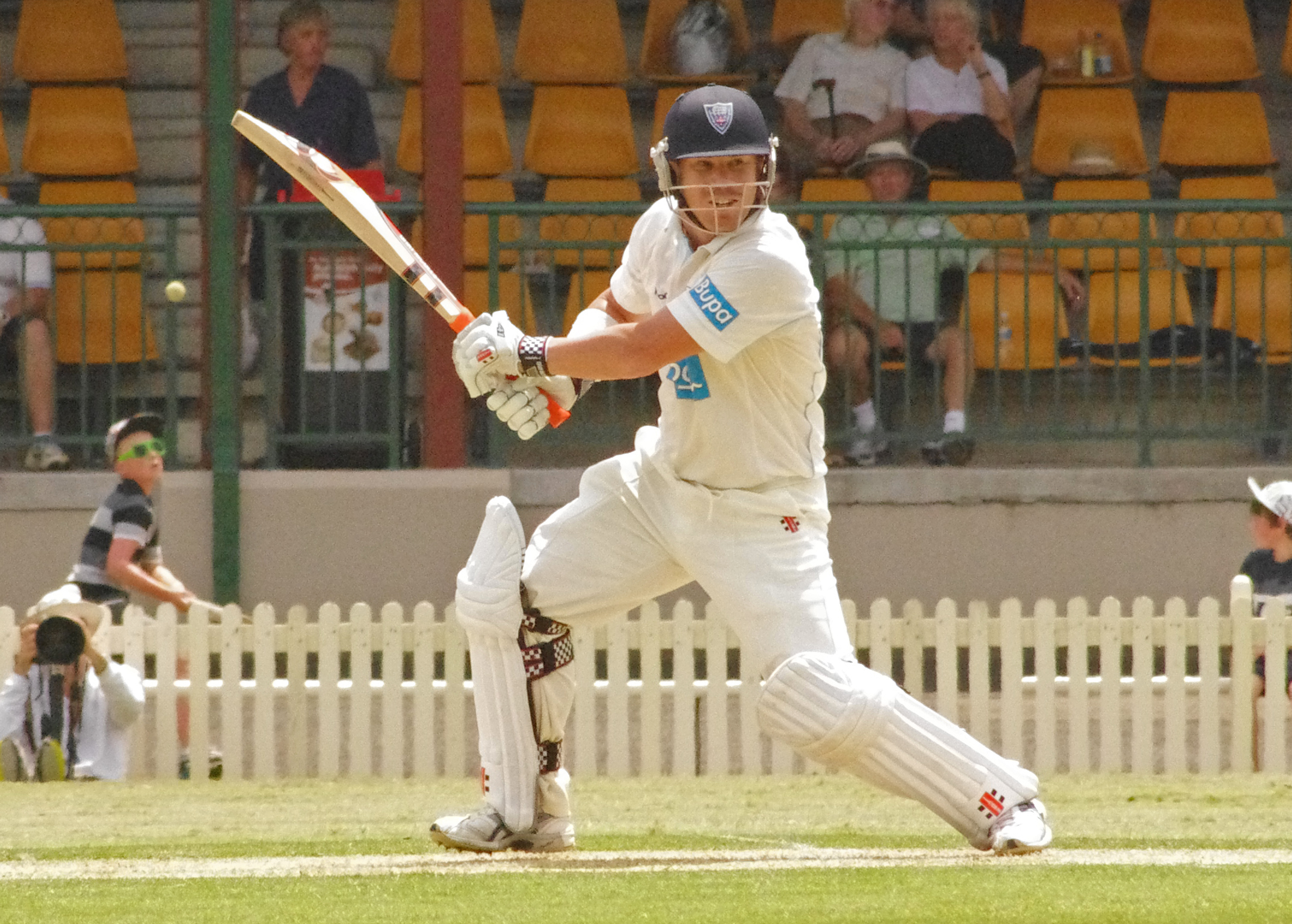
David Warner became highest run-getter for SRH winning Orange Cap in IPL 2015.

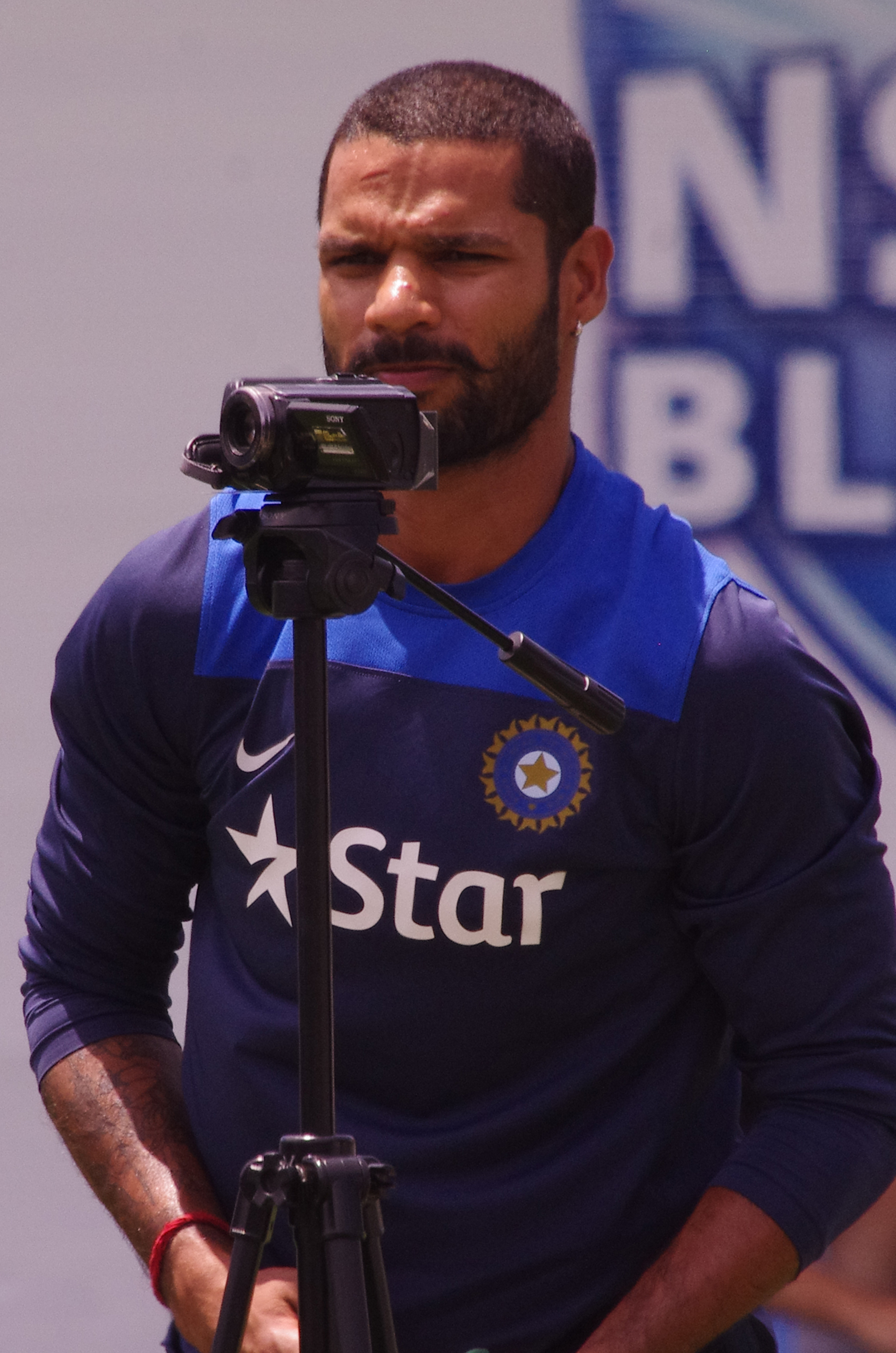
Shikhar Dhawan became second highest run-getter for SRH in IPL 2015.

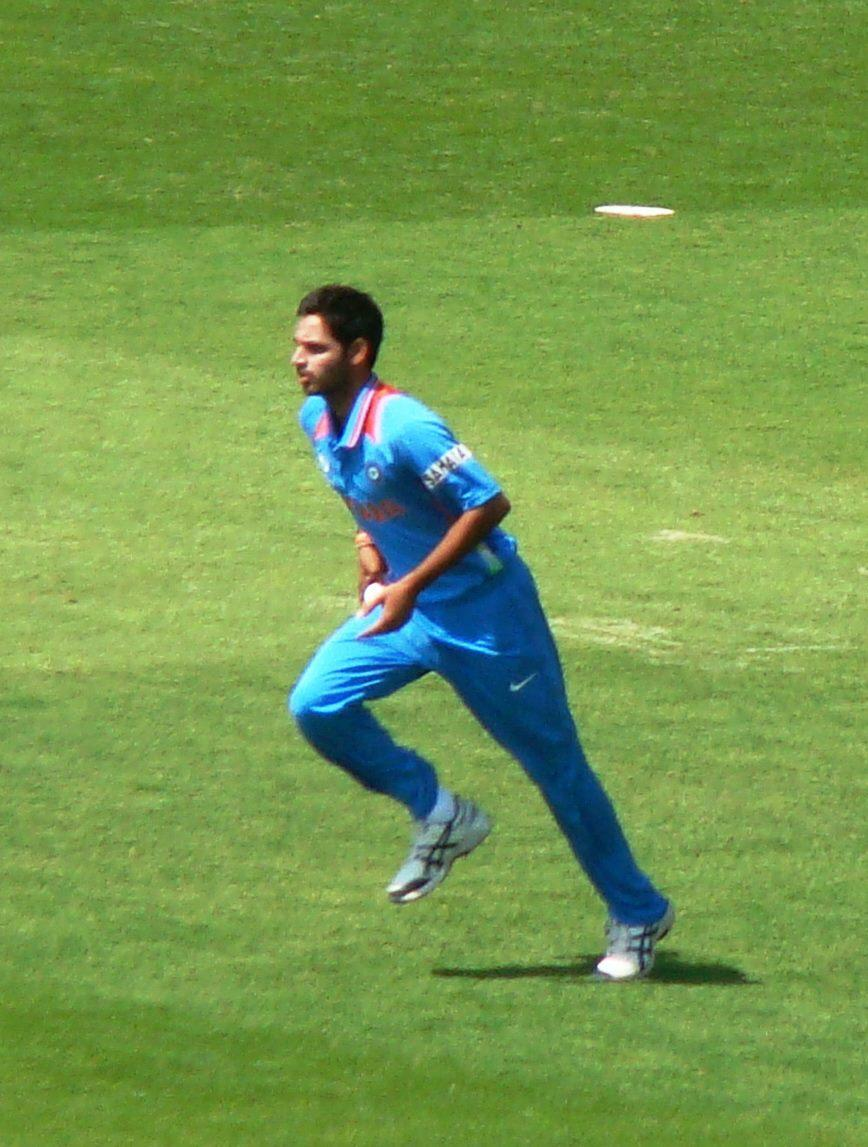
Bhuvneshwar Kumar became highest wicket-taker for SRH in IPL 2015.

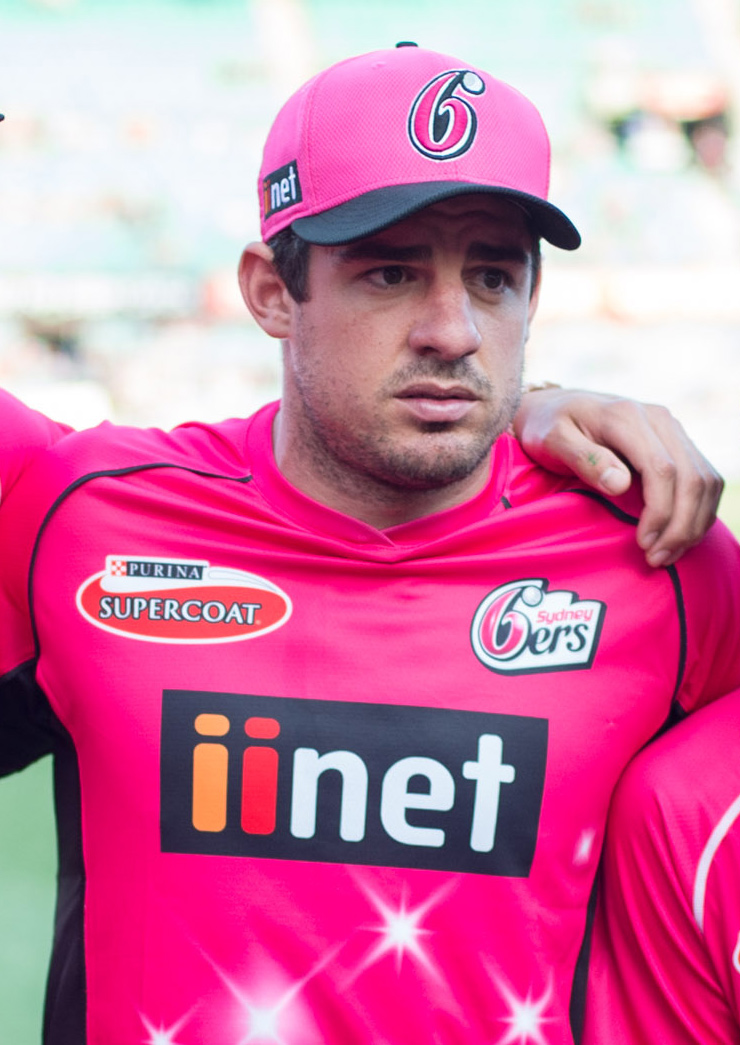
Moises Henriques became second highest wicket-taker for SRH in IPL 2015.

Name	Mat	Runs	HS	Ave	SR	Wkts	BBI	Ave	Eco	Ct	St
Shikhar Dhawan	14	353	54	27.15	123.42	-	-	-	-	6	0
David Warner	14	562	91	43.23	156.54	-	-	-	-	8	0
Moisés Henriques	9	287	74*	41.00	136.01	11	3/16	14.36	6.32	1	0
Eoin Morgan	9	187	63	23.37	123.84	-	-	-	-	5	0
Ravi Bopara	9	145	41	29.00	120.83	6	2/18	26.66	8.00	2	0
K. L. Rahul	9	142	44*	28.40	126.00	-	-	-	-	1	0
Naman Ojha	14	137	28	13.70	113.22	-	-	-	-	6	1
Karn Sharma	14	104	32	17.33	122.35	10	2/12	33.20	8.33	4	0
Ashish Reddy	6	73	22*	24.33	158.69	3	1/11	16.66	8.33	1	0
Hanuma Vihari	5	39	16	9.75	111.42	-	-	-	-	2	0
Kane Williamson	2	31	26*	31.00	114.81	-	-	-	-	2	0
Dale Steyn	6	20	19*	20.00	153.84	3	2/38	56.66	8.94	2	0
Bhuvneshwar Kumar	14	17	11*	17.00	170.00	18	3/26	22.61	7.87	5	0
Praveen Kumar	12	17	12	5.66	68.00	7	2/35	47.00	9.13	3	0
Parvez Rasool	2	2	2*	-	100.00	1	1/20	31.00	6.20	0	0
Bipul Sharma	4	1	1	1.00	50.00	3	2/13	16.66	7.14	0	0
Trent Boult	7	-	-	-	-	9	3/19	26.22	8.42	2	0
Ishant Sharma	4	-	-	-	-	1	1/25	159.00	11.35	0	0

Full Table on ESPNcricinfo

== Awards and achievements ==
=== Awards ===
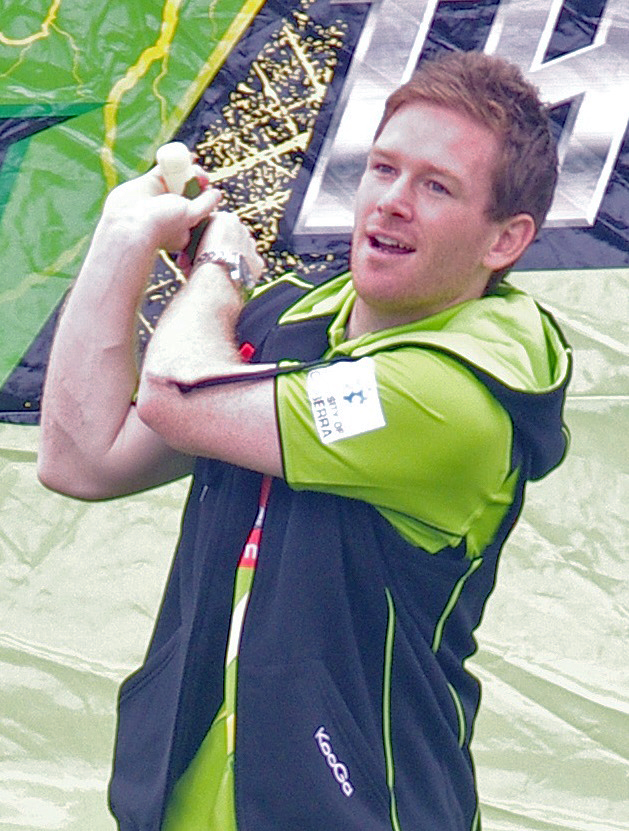
Eoin Morgan won Man of the Match award for Sunrisers Hyderabad against Rajasthan Royals

Man of the Match

No.	Date	Player	Opponent	Venue	Result	Contribution
1	13 April 2015	David Warner	Royal Challengers Bangalore	Bangalore	Won by 8 wickets	57 (27)
2	22 April 2015	David Warner	Kolkata Knight Riders	Visakhapatnam	Won by 16 runs (D/L)	91 (55)
3	27 April 2015	Trent Boult	Kings XI Punjab	Mohali	Won by 20 runs	3/19 (4 overs)
4	2 May 2015	David Warner	Chennai Super Kings	Hyderabad	Won by 22 runs	61 (28)
5	7 May 2015	Eoin Morgan	Rajasthan Royals	Mumbai	Won by 7 runs	63 (28)
6	9 May 2015	Moises Henriques	Delhi Daredevils	Raipur	Won by 6 runs	74* (46)
7	11 May 2015	David Warner	Kings XI Punjab	Hyderabad	Won by 5 runs	81 (52)

Season Awards

- Winner of Orange Cap: David Warner

=== Achievements ===
- David Warner becomes the First Player to score 50+ as a captain.
- Yes Bank Maximum Super Sixes Competition : Moises Henriques
- Hat-trick of Winning streak
- Best Catches of the season: David Warner
- Most Fours scored : David Warner
- Best Bowling Average : Moises Henriques

== Reaction ==
Ahead of the 2015 season, the IPL saw increase in its brand value by 9% to US$3.54 billion while the Sunrisers' brand value was increased by 40% to US$35 million, according to American Appraisal.

== See also ==
- List of Sunrisers Hyderabad records
