= 2015 Mumbai Indians season =

Indian Premier League cricket team season

Mumbai Indians
2015 season
- Coach: Ricky Ponting
- Captain: Rohit Sharma
- Ground(s): Wankhede Stadium, Mumbai (33,108)
- IPL: Champions
- Most runs: Lendl Simmons (540)
- Most wickets: Lasith Malinga (24)
- Most catches: Kieron Pollard (13); Ambati Rayudu (9)
- Most wicket-keeping dismissals: Parthiv Patel (7)

Mumbai Indians (MI) is a franchise cricket team based in Mumbai, India, which plays in the Indian Premier League (IPL). They were one of the eight teams that competed in the 2015 Indian Premier League. They were captained by Rohit Sharma.

The Mumbai Indians reached the final of the 2015 IPL where they beat Chennai Super Kings to win the title.

== Squad ==
- Players with international caps before the start of 2015 IPL are listed in **bold**.

No.	Name	Nationality	Birth date	Batting style	Bowling style	Year signed	Salary	Notes
Batsmen
5	**Aaron Finch** (Note: ruled out of the season with an injury)	Australia	17 November 1986 (aged 28)	Right-handed	Left-arm orthodox	2015	₹3.2 crore (US$500,000)	Overseas
7	Siddhesh Lad	India	23 May 1992 (aged 22)	Right-handed	Right arm off break	2015	₹10 lakh (US$20,000)	
9	**Ambati Rayudu**	India	23 September 1985 (aged 29)	Right-handed	Right-arm off break	2014	₹4 crore (US$620,000)	Occasional wicket-keeper
15	Unmukt Chand	India	26 March 1993 (aged 22)	Right-handed	Right arm off break	2015	Traded player	
45	**Rohit Sharma**	India	30 April 1987 (aged 27)	Right-handed	Right-arm off break	2014	₹12.5 crore (US$1.95 million)	Captain
54	**Lendl Simmons**	Trinidad and Tobago	25 January 1985 (aged 30)	Right-handed	Right-arm medium	2014	₹90 lakh (US$140,000)	Overseas
	Aiden Blizzard	Australia	27 June 1984 (aged 30)	Left-handed	Left-arm medium	2015	₹30 lakh (US$50,000)	Overseas
	**Colin Munro**	New Zealand	11 March 1987 (aged 28)	Left-handed	Right-arm medium-fast	2015	Replacement signing	Overseas
	**Alex Hales**	England	3 January 1989 (aged 26)	Right-handed	Right-arm medium	2015	Replacement signing	Overseas
	Nitish Rana	India	27 December 1993 (aged 21)	Left-handed	Right arm off break	2015	₹10 lakh (US$20,000)	
All-rounders
19	Shreyas Gopal	India	4 September 1993 (aged 21)	Right-handed	Right-arm leg break	2014	₹10 lakh (US$20,000)	
55	**Kieron Pollard**	Trinidad and Tobago	12 May 1987 (aged 27)	Right-handed	Right-arm medium-fast	2014	₹7.5 crore (US$1.17 million)	Overseas/Vice-captain
78	**Corey Anderson** (Note: ruled out of the season with an injury)	New Zealand	13 December 1990 (aged 24)	Left-handed	Left-arm medium-fast	2014	₹4.5 crore (US$700,000)	Overseas
228	Hardik Pandya	India	11 October 1993 (aged 21)	Right-handed	Right-arm medium-fast	2015	₹10 lakh (US$20,000)	
Wicket-keepers
27	Aditya Tare	India	7 November 1987 (aged 27)	Right-handed		2014	₹1.6 crore (US$250,000)	
72	**Parthiv Patel**	India	9 March 1985 (aged 30)	Left-handed		2015	Traded player	
Bowlers
3	**Harbhajan Singh**	India	3 July 1980 (aged 34)	Right-handed	Right-arm off break	2014	₹9.5 crore (US$1.48 million)	
8	**Josh Hazlewood** (Note: withdrew citing rest before international cricket)	Australia	8 January 1991 (aged 24)	Left-handed	Right-arm fast-medium	2014	₹50 lakh (US$80,000)	Overseas
12	Jasprit Bumrah	India	6 December 1993 (aged 21)	Right-handed	Right-arm medium-fast	2014	₹1.2 crore (US$190,000)	
16	Jagadeesha Suchith	India	16 January 1994 (aged 21)	Left-handed	Slow left-arm orthodox	2015	₹10 lakh (US$20,000)	
23	**Vinay Kumar**	India	12 February 1984 (aged 31)	Right-handed	Right-arm medium-fast	2015	Traded player	
30	**Pragyan Ojha**	India	9 March 1985 (aged 30)	Left-handed	Slow left-arm orthodox	2015	₹50 lakh (US$80,000)	
33	Pawan Suyal	India	15 October 1989 (aged 25)	Right-handed	Left-arm medium-fast	2014	₹10 lakh (US$20,000)	
81	**Mitchell McClenaghan**	New Zealand	11 June 1986 (aged 28)	Left-handed	Left-arm fast-medium	2015	₹30 lakh (US$50,000)	Overseas
90	**Marchant de Lange**	South Africa	13 October 1990 (aged 24)	Right-handed	Right-arm fast	2014	₹30 lakh (US$50,000)	Overseas
99	**Lasith Malinga**	Sri Lanka	28 August 1983 (aged 31)	Right-handed	Right-arm fast	2014	₹5.5 crore (US$860,000)	Overseas
	**Abhimanyu Mithun**	India	25 October 1989 (aged 25)	Right-handed	Right-arm fast-medium	2015	₹30 lakh (US$50,000)	
	Akshay Wakhare	India	3 October 1985 (aged 29)	Right-handed	Right arm off break	2015	₹10 lakh (US$20,000)	
	**Ben Hilfenhaus**	Australia	15 March 1983 (aged 32)	Right-handed	Right-arm fast-medium	2015	Replacement signing	Overseas

== IPL ==
=== Standings ===
Mumbai Indians finished second in the league stage of IPL 2015.

Pos	Team	Pld	W	L	NR	Pts	NRR
1	Chennai Super Kings (R)	14	9	5	0	18	0.709
2	Mumbai Indians (C)	14	8	6	0	16	−0.043
3	Royal Challengers Bangalore (3)	14	7	5	2	16	1.037
4	Rajasthan Royals (4)	14	7	5	2	16	0.062
5	Kolkata Knight Riders	14	7	6	1	15	0.253
6	Sunrisers Hyderabad	14	7	7	0	14	−0.239
7	Delhi Daredevils	14	5	8	1	11	−0.049
8	Kings XI Punjab	14	3	11	0	6	−1.436

- Top 4 teams were qualified for the playoffs
- advanced to the Qualifier
- advanced to the Eliminator

("C" refers to the "Champions" of the Tournament. 'R'(2nd Position), '3' and '4' are the positions of the respective teams in the tournament.)

=== Results ===
==== Match log ====
No.	Date	Opponent	Venue	Result	Scorecard
1	April 8	Kolkata Knight Riders	Kolkata	Lost by 7 wickets	Cricinfo
2	April 12	Kings XI Punjab	Mumbai	Lost by 18 runs	Cricinfo
3	April 14	Rajasthan Royals	Ahedabad	Lost by 7 wickets	Cricinfo
4	April 17	Chennai Super Kings	Mumbai	Lost by 5 wickets	Cricinfo
5	April 19	Royal Challengers Bangalore	Bengaluru	Won by 18 runs, MoM – Harbhajan Singh 3/27 (4 overs)	Cricinfo
6	April 23	Delhi Daredevils	New Delhi	Lost by 38 runs	Cricinfo
7	April 25	Sunrisers Hyderabad	Mumbai	Won by 20 runs, MoM – Lasith Malinga 4/23 (4 overs)	Cricinfo
8	May 1	Rajasthan Royals	Mumbai	Won by 8 runs, MoM – Ambati Rayudu 53* (27)	Cricinfo
9	May 3	Kings XI Punjab	Mohali	Won by 23 runs, MoM – Lendl Simmons 71 (56)	Cricinfo
10	May 5	Delhi Daredevils	Mumbai	Won by 5 wickets, MoM - Harbhajan Singh 2/11 (4 overs)	Cricinfo
11	May 8	Chennai Super Kings	Chennai	Won by 6 wickets, MoM - Hardik Pandya 21 (8)	Cricinfo
12	May 10	Royal Challengers Bangalore	Mumbai	Lost by 40 runs	Cricinfo
13	May 14	Kolkata Knight Riders	Mumbai	Won by 5 runs, MoM - Hardik Pandya 61 (31)	Cricinfo
14	May 17	Sunrisers Hyderabad	Hyderabad	Won by 9 wickets, MoM - Mitchell McClenaghan 3/16 (4 overs)	Cricinfo
15	May 19	Chennai Super Kings (Qualifier 1)	Mumbai	Won by 25 runs, MoM - Kieron Pollard 41 (17)	Cricinfo
16	May 24	Chennai Super Kings (Final)	Kolkata	Won by 41 runs, MoM - Rohit Sharma 50 (26)	Cricinfo

==== Playoffs ====
Semifinals
19 May — Wankhede Stadium, Mumbai
1	Chennai Super Kings	162 (19 ov)
2	Mumbai Indians (H)	187/6 (20 ov)
20 May — MCA Stadium, Pune
3	Royal Challengers Bangalore	180/4 (20 ov)
4	Rajasthan Royals	109 (19 ov)

Preliminary final
22 May — JSCA International Cricket Stadium, Ranchi
1	Chennai Super Kings	140/7 (19.5 ov)
3	Royal Challengers Bangalore	139/8 (20 ov)

Final
24 May — Eden Gardens, Kolkata
2	Mumbai Indians	202/5 (20 ov)
1	Chennai Super Kings	161/8 (20 ov)

Qualifier 1

19 May
20:00 (D/N)
Scorecard

(H) Mumbai Indians; 187/6 (20 overs)	v	Chennai Super Kings; 162 (19 overs)
Lendl Simmons 65 (51); Dwayne Bravo 3/40 (4 overs)		Faf du Plessis 45 (34); Lasith Malinga 3/23 (4 overs)

Mumbai Indians won by 25 runs
Wankhede Stadium, Mumbai
Umpires: Kumar Dharmasena (SL) and Richard Illingworth (Eng)
Player of the match: Kieron Pollard (MI)

- Mumbai Indians won the toss and elected to bat

Final

24 May
20:00 (D/N)
Scorecard

Mumbai Indians; 202/5 (20 overs)	v	Chennai Super Kings; 161/8 (20 overs)
Lendl Simmons 68 (45); Dwayne Bravo 2/36 (4 overs)		Dwayne Smith 57 (58); Mitchell McClenaghan 3/25 (4 overs)

Mumbai Indians won by 41 runs
Eden Gardens, Kolkata
Umpires: Kumar Dharmasena (SL) and Richard Illingworth (Eng)
Player of the match: Rohit Sharma (MI)

- Chennai Super Kings won the toss and elected to field
