= Gabriel Xavier =

Gabriel Xavier may refer to:

- Gabriel Xavier (footballer, born 1993), Brazilian professional footballer
- Gabriel Xavier (footballer, born 2001), Brazilian professional footballer
- Gabriel Xavier Paul Koenigs (1858–1931), French mathematician
- Xavier Gabriel (born 1985), Saint Lucian cricketer
