= Saint Lucia national cricket team =

Saint Lucia

Personnel
- Captain: Craig Emmanuel
- Coach: Alton Crafton

Team information
- Colours: Black, Yellow, Blue
- Home ground: Beausejour Stadium Mindoo Philip Park

History
- Four Day wins: n/a
- WICB Cup wins: n/a
- Twenty20 wins: 0

The Saint Lucia national cricket team represents the country of Saint Lucia in cricket. The team is a member of the Windward Islands Cricket Board of Control, which itself is a member association of the West Indies Cricket Board. Players from St Lucia generally represent the Windward Islands cricket team at domestic level and the West Indies at international level. St Lucia has however played as a separate entity in matches which held Twenty20 status (Stanford 20/20), but has not appeared in first-class or List A cricket. St Lucia competes with St Vincent & the Grenadines, Grenada and Dominica in domestic Windward Islands cricket competitions including the Windward Islands two-day and Twenty20 cricket championships. The team's captain, as of 2014, is Craig Emmanuel.

== Notable players ==
=== International players ===
Darren Sammy is St Lucia's most decorated player. He became the first St Lucian to represent the West Indies when he made his debut against New Zealand in an ODI match in 2004. Sammy made his test debut against England in June 2007. A natural leader on the pitch, Sammy became West Indies captain in 2010.

Three players from Saint Lucia have represented the West Indies at International Level, Darren Sammy, Johnson Charles and Garey Mathurin.

- Apps denotes the number of appearances the player has made.
- Runs denotes the number of runs scored by the player.
- Wkts denotes the number of wickets taken by the player.

Name	International career	Apps	Runs	Wkts	Apps	Runs	Wkts	Apps	Runs	Wkts	References
Name	International career	Tests			ODIs			T20Is			References
Darren Sammy	2004–2015	38	1,323	84	126	1,871	81	58	511	43	
Johnson Charles	2011–2015	–	–	–	32	927	0	21	429	0	
Garey Mathurin	2011–2012	–	–	–	–	–	–	3	4	4	

Many other St Lucian players have represented the Windward Islands domestically in the West Indies Regional Super50, Regional Four Day Competition and the Caribbean Twenty20.

=== St Lucia players on the current Windward Islands team ===
- Darren Sammy
- Johnson Charles
- Garey Mathurin
- Craig Emmanuel
- Keddy Lesporis
- Dalton Polius
- Tarryck Gabriel

=== See also ===
List of Windward Islands first-class cricketers

== Squad ==
Players with international caps are listed in bold.

No.	Name	Birth date	Batting style	Bowling style	Notes
Batsmen
-	Craig Emmanuel	9 September 1985 (age 40)	Right-handed	Right arm medium-fast	Captain
-	Keddy Lesporis	27 December 1988 (age 37)	Right-handed	Right arm off break	Vice-captain
-	Sergio Fedee	13 January 1983 (age 43)	Left-handed	Right arm medium	
-	Alex Antoine	1 January 1987 (age 39)	Left-handed	Right arm off break	
-	Mervin Wells	16 January 1987 (age 39)	Right-handed	-	
-	Dennis Louis				
-	Stephen Naitram				
All-rounders
-	**Darren Sammy**	20 December 1983 (age 42)	Right-handed	Right arm medium-fast	
-	Dalton Polius	12 September 1990 (age 35)	Left-handed	Right arm off break	
-	Taryck Gabriel	6 April 1995 (age 30)	Right-handed	Right arm off break	
-	Larry Edwards	(age 19)		Left arm Slow left-arm orthodox	
-	Kurt Edward	11 September 1991 (age 34)	Right-Handed	Right arm medium-fast	
-	Dwight Thomas	(age 23)	Right-Handed	Right arm off break	
-	Audy Alexander	(age 23)	Left-Handed	Left arm Slow left-arm orthodox	
Wicket-keepers
-	**Johnson Charles**	14 January 1989 (age 37)	Right-handed	-	
-	Jason Simon		Right-handed	-	
-	Gaspard Prospere	(aged 31)	Right-handed	-	
-	Vidal Crandon			-	
Bowlers
-	**Garey Mathurin**	23 September 1983 (age 42)	Left-handed	Left arm Slow left-arm orthodox	
-	Xavier Gabriel	18 December 1985 (age 40)	Right-handed	Right arm fast-medium	
-	Kevin Augustine		Right-handed	Right arm fast-medium	
-	Loic Prospere		Right-handed	Right arm fast-medium	
-	Marlon O Brian			Left arm Slow left-arm orthodox	

- St Lucia Squad - 2014
- St Lucia Squad - 2014
- St Lucia Squad - 2013
