= 2015 Delhi Daredevils season =

Indian Premier League cricket team season

Delhi Daredevils
2015 season
- Coach: Gary Kirsten
- Captain: Jean Paul Duminy
- Ground(s): Feroz Shah Kotla, Delhi
- IPL: 7th
- Most runs: Shreyas Iyer (439)
- Most wickets: Imran Tahir (15)

Delhi Daredevils (DD) are a franchise cricket team based in Delhi, India, which plays in the Indian Premier League (IPL). They were one of the eight teams that competed in the 2015 Indian Premier League. They were captained by JP Duminy. Delhi Daredevils finished 7th in the IPL.

== Indian Premier League ==
=== Standings ===
Delhi Daredevils finished 7th in the league stage of IPL 2015.

Pos	Team	Pld	W	L	NR	Pts	NRR
1	Chennai Super Kings (R)	14	9	5	0	18	0.709
2	Mumbai Indians (C)	14	8	6	0	16	−0.043
3	Royal Challengers Bangalore (3)	14	7	5	2	16	1.037
4	Rajasthan Royals (4)	14	7	5	2	16	0.062
5	Kolkata Knight Riders	14	7	6	1	15	0.253
6	Sunrisers Hyderabad	14	7	7	0	14	−0.239
7	Delhi Daredevils	14	5	8	1	11	−0.049
8	Kings XI Punjab	14	3	11	0	6	−1.436

- Top 4 teams were qualified for the playoffs
- advanced to the Qualifier
- advanced to the Eliminator

("C" refers to the "Champions" of the Tournament. 'R'(2nd Position), '3' and '4' are the positions of the respective teams in the tournament.)

=== Match log ===
No.	Date	Opponent	Venue	Result	Man of the Match	Scorecard link
1	9 April 2015	Chennai Super Kings	Chennai	Lost by 1 run		Scorecard
2	12 April 2015	Rajasthan Royals (H)	New Delhi	Lost by 3 wickets		Scorecard
3	15 April 2015	Kings XI Punjab	Pune	Won by 5 wickets	Mayank Agarwal 68 (48)	Scorecard
4	18 April 2015	Sunrisers Hyderabad	Visakhapatnam	Won by 4 runs	JP Duminy 54 (41) & 4/17 (3 Overs)	Scorecard
5	20 April 2015	Kolkata Knight Riders (H)	New Delhi	Lost by 6 wickets		Scorecard
6	23 April 2015	Mumbai Indians (H)	New Delhi	Won by 37 runs	Shreyas Iyer 83 (56)	Scorecard
7	26 April 2015	Royal Challengers Bangalore (H)	New Delhi	Lost by 10 wickets		Scorecard
8	1 May 2015	Kings XI Punjab (H)	New Delhi	Won by 9 wickets	Nathan Coulter-Nile 4/20 (4 Overs)	Scorecard
9	3 May 2015	Rajasthan Royals	Mumbai	Lost by 15 runs		Scorecard
10	5 May 2015	Mumbai Indians	Mumbai	Lost by 5 wickets		Scorecard
11	7 May 2015	Kolkata Knight Riders	Kolkata	Lost by 14 runs		Scorecard
12	9 May 2015	Sunrisers Hyderabad (H)	Raipur	Lost by 6 runs		Scorecard
13	12 May 2015	Chennai Super Kings (H)	Raipur	Won by 6 wickets	Zaheer Khan 2/9 (4 Overs)	Scorecard
14	17 May 2015	Royal Challengers Bangalore	Bangalore	No result		Scorecard
Overall record: 5–8. Failed to advance.

== Statistics ==
Most runs
Player	Runs
Shreyas Iyer	439
JP Duminy	414
Yuvraj Singh	248

Most wickets
Player	Wickets
Nathan Coulter-Nile	15
Imran Tahir	15
Amit Mishra	9
