= Chad Williams (cricketer) =

Barbadian cricketer (born 1995)

Personal information
- Full name: Chad Jay Williams
- Born: 28 November 1995 (age 30); Barbados
- Batting: Right-handed
- Bowling: Left-arm orthodox
- Source: CricketArchive, 13 January 2016

Chad Jay Williams (born 28 November 1995) is a Barbadian cricketer who has played for the West Indies under-19s team. A slow left-arm orthodox bowler, Williams has played for Barbados at under-19 level, but is yet to make his senior debut. His debut for the West Indies under-19s came in the 2014–15 Regional Super50, where matches held List A status. Chad played in all three of his team's matches in the competition, against Trinidad and Tobago, the Leeward Islands, and Jamaica. His best performance came on debut against Trinidad and Tobago, when he took 2/17 from his two overs.
