= Nicholas Sookdeosingh =

Trinidadian cricketer (born 1989)

Personal information
- Born: 23 July 1989 (age 37); Trinidad
- Batting: Left-handed
- Role: Opening batsman

Domestic team information
- Years: Team
- 2015: Trinidad and Tobago
- Source: CricketArchive, 3 January 2016

Nicholas Sookdeosingh (born 23 July 1989) is a Trinidadian cricketer who has played for the Trinidad and Tobago national team in West Indian domestic cricket.

Sookdeosingh made his List A debut for Trinidad and Tobago in the 2014–15 Regional Super50, against the West Indies under-19s. Opening the batting with Evin Lewis on debut, he scored 35 from 35 balls. In his other matches in the competition, Sookdeosingh scored 19 against Jamaica, and was out for a two-ball duck against the Leeward Islands.
