= Jaeel Clarke =

West Indian cricketer (born 1997)

Jaleel Ajorn Clarke
Personal information
- Born: 6 September 1997 (age 29); Saint Kitts
- Source: Cricinfo, 12 November 2017

Jaleel Clarke (born 6 September 1997) is a West Indian cricketer. He played his only List A cricket match for West Indies under-19 cricket team in the Nagico Super50 2014–2015 on 20 January 2015.
