= 2015 Rajasthan Royals season =

Indian Premier League cricket team season

Rajasthan Royals
2015 season
- Coach: Paddy Upton
- Captain: Shane Watson
- Ground(s): Sardar Patel Stadium, Ahmedabad
- IPL: 4th
- Most runs: Ajinkya Rahane (540)
- Most wickets: Dhawal Kulkarni (13)

Rajasthan Royals (RR) is a franchise cricket team based in Jaipur, India, which plays in the Indian Premier League (IPL). They were one of the eight teams that competed in the 2015 Indian Premier League. They were captained by Shane Watson. Rajasthan Royals finished 4th in the IPL and qualified for the champions league T20.

== IPL ==
=== Standings ===
Rajasthan Royals finished 4th in the league stage of IPL 2015.

Pos	Team	Pld	W	L	NR	Pts	NRR
1	Chennai Super Kings (R)	14	9	5	0	18	0.709
2	Mumbai Indians (C)	14	8	6	0	16	−0.043
3	Royal Challengers Bangalore (3)	14	7	5	2	16	1.037
4	Rajasthan Royals (4)	14	7	5	2	16	0.062
5	Kolkata Knight Riders	14	7	6	1	15	0.253
6	Sunrisers Hyderabad	14	7	7	0	14	−0.239
7	Delhi Daredevils	14	5	8	1	11	−0.049
8	Kings XI Punjab	14	3	11	0	6	−1.436

- Top 4 teams were qualified for the playoffs
- advanced to the Qualifier
- advanced to the Eliminator

("C" refers to the "Champions" of the Tournament. 'R'(2nd Position), '3' and '4' are the positions of the respective teams in the tournament.)

=== Match log ===
No.	Date	Opponent	Venue	Result	Man of the match	Scorecard
1	10 April 2015	Kings XI Punjab	Pune	Won by 26 runs	James Faulkner 46(33)	Scorecard
2	12 April 2015	Delhi Daredevils	Delhi	Won by 3 wickets	Deepak Hooda 54(25)	Scorecard
3	14 April 2015	Mumbai Indians	Ahmedabad	Won by 7 wickets	Steven Smith 79* (53)	Scorecard
4	16 April 2015	Sunrisers Hyderabad	Visakhapatnam	Won by 6 wickets	Ajinkya Rahane 62 (56)	Scorecard
5	19 April 2015	Chennai Super Kings	Ahmedabad	Won by 8 wickets	Ajinkya Rahane 76* (55)	Scorecard
6	21 April 2015	Kings XI Punjab	Ahmedabad	Match Tied, Lost Super Over		Scorecard
7	24 April 2015	Royal Challengers Bangalore	Ahmedabad	Lost by 9 wickets		Scorecard
8	26 April 2015	Kolkata Knight Riders	Kolkata	"No Toss" Match abandoned without a ball bowled		Scorecard
9	29 April 2015	Royal Challengers Bangalore	Bengaluru	No Result		Scorecard
10	1 May 2015	Mumbai Indians	Mumbai	Lost by 9 runs		Scorecard
11	3 May 2015	Delhi Daredevils	Mumbai	Won by 14 runs	Ajinkya Rahane 91*(54)	Scorecard
12	7 May 2015	Sunrisers Hyderabad	Mumbai	Lost by 8 runs		Scorecard
13	10 May 2015	Chennai Super Kings	Chennai	Lost by 13 runs		Scorecard
14	16 May 2015	Kolkata Knight Riders	Mumbai	Won by 9 runs	Shane Watson 104*(59) & 2/38(4 Overs)	Scorecard
15	20 May 2015	Royal Challengers Bangalore (Eliminator)	Pune	Lost by 72 runs		Scorecard
