= 2015 Kolkata Knight Riders season =

Indian Premier League cricket team season

Kolkata Knight Riders
2015 season
- Coach: Trevor Bayliss
- Captain: Gautam Gambhir
- Ground(s): Eden Gardens, Kolkata
- IPL: 5th
- Most runs: Robin Uthappa (364)
- Most wickets: Andre Russell (14)

Kolkata Knight Riders (KKR) is a franchise cricket team based in Kolkata, India, which plays in the Indian Premier League (IPL). They were one of the eight teams that competed in the 2015 IPL. They were captained by Gautam Gambhir. The KKR finished 5th in the IPL and did not qualify for the Champions League T20.

== Indian Premier League ==
=== Season standings ===
Kolkata Knight Riders finished 5th in the league stage of IPL 2015.

Pos	Team	Pld	W	L	NR	Pts	NRR
1	Chennai Super Kings (R)	14	9	5	0	18	0.709
2	Mumbai Indians (C)	14	8	6	0	16	−0.043
3	Royal Challengers Bangalore (3)	14	7	5	2	16	1.037
4	Rajasthan Royals (4)	14	7	5	2	16	0.062
5	Kolkata Knight Riders	14	7	6	1	15	0.253
6	Sunrisers Hyderabad	14	7	7	0	14	−0.239
7	Delhi Daredevils	14	5	8	1	11	−0.049
8	Kings XI Punjab	14	3	11	0	6	−1.436

- Top 4 teams were qualified for the playoffs
- advanced to the Qualifier
- advanced to the Eliminator

("C" refers to the "Champions" of the Tournament. 'R'(2nd Position), '3' and '4' are the positions of the respective teams in the tournament.)

=== Match log ===
No.	Date	Opponent	Venue	Result	Scorecard
1	April 8, 2015	Mumbai Indians	Kolkata	Won by 7 wickets, MoM - Morne Morkel 2/18 (4 Overs)	Scorecard
2	April 11, 2015	Royal Challengers Bangalore	Kolkata	Lost by 3 wickets	Scorecard
3	April 18, 2015	Kings XI Punjab	Pune	Won by 4 wickets, MoM - Andre Russell 66(36) and 2/39 (4 Overs)	Scorecard
4	April 20, 2015	Delhi Daredevils	New Delhi	Won by 6 wickets, MoM - Umesh Yadav 2/18 (4 Overs)	Scorecard
5	April 22, 2015	Sunrisers Hyderabad	Visakhapatnam	Lost by 16 runs (D/L)	Scorecard
6	April 26, 2015	Rajasthan Royals	Kolkata	Match abandoned without a ball bowled	Scorecard
7	April 28, 2015	Chennai Super Kings	Chennai	Lost by 2 runs	Scorecard
8	April 30, 2015	Chennai Super Kings	Kolkata	Won by 7 wickets, MoM - Andre Russell 55(32) and 2/20 (4 Overs)	Scorecard
9	May 2, 2015	Royal Challengers Bangalore	Bengaluru	Lost by 7 wickets	Scorecard
10	May 4, 2015	Sunrisers Hyderabad	Kolkata	Won by 35 runs, MoM - Umesh Yadav 2/34 (4 Overs)	Scorecard
11	May 7, 2015	Delhi Daredevils	Kolkata	Won by 13 Runs, MoM - Piyush Chawla 4/32 (4 Overs) and 22(19)	Scorecard
12	May 9, 2015	Kings XI Punjab	Kolkata	Won by 1 wicket, MoM - Andre Russell 51(21)	Scorecard
13	May 14, 2015	Mumbai Indians	Mumbai	Lost by 5 runs	Scorecard
14	May 16, 2015	Rajasthan Royals	Mumbai	Lost by 9 runs	Scorecard
Overall record: 7–6. Failed to advance.
