= Mervin Wells =

Saint Lucian cricketer (born 1987)

Personal information
- Full name: Mervin Wells
- Born: 16 January 1987 (age 39); Saint Lucia
- Batting: Right-handed
- Role: Batsman

Domestic team information
- Years: Team
- 2008: Saint Lucia
- 2013: Windward Islands
- Source: CricketArchive, May 11 2016

Mervin Wells (birth January 16, 1987, in St Lucia) is a Saint Lucian cricketer who played for the Saint Lucia national cricket team in Stanford 20/20 as well as Windward Islands cricket team in West Indian domestic cricket. He played as a right-handed batsman.
