= Michael Frew =

Jamaican cricketer (born 1997)

Personal information
- Born: 15 December 1997 (age 28); Westmoreland, Jamaica
- Source: Cricinfo, 31 December 2015

Michael Frew (born 15 December 1997) is a Jamaican cricketer. He made his List A debut on 20 January 2015 in the 2014–15 Regional Super50 tournament. In December 2015 he was named in the West Indie's squad for the 2016 Under-19 Cricket World Cup.
