= 2015 Kings XI Punjab season =

Annual play of Indian cricket team

Kings XI Punjab
2015 season
- Coach: Sanjay Bangar
- Captain: George Bailey
- Ground(s): PCA Stadium, Mohali
- IPL: 8th
- Most runs: David Miller (359)
- Most wickets: Anureet Singh (15)

Kings XI Punjab (KXIP) is a franchise cricket team based in Mohali, India, which plays in the Indian Premier League (IPL). They were one of the eight teams that competed in the 2015 Indian Premier League. They were captained by George Bailey. Kings XI Punjab finished last in the IPL and did not qualify for the Champions League T20.

== Indian Premier League ==
=== Season standings ===
Kings XI Punjab finished last in the league stage of IPL 2015.

| Pos | Team | Pld | W | L | NR | Pts | NRR |
|---|---|---|---|---|---|---|---|
| 1 | Chennai Super Kings (R) | 14 | 9 | 5 | 0 | 18 | 0.709 |
| 2 | Mumbai Indians (C) | 14 | 8 | 6 | 0 | 16 | −0.043 |
| 3 | Royal Challengers Bangalore (3) | 14 | 7 | 5 | 2 | 16 | 1.037 |
| 4 | Rajasthan Royals (4) | 14 | 7 | 5 | 2 | 16 | 0.062 |
| 5 | Kolkata Knight Riders | 14 | 7 | 6 | 1 | 15 | 0.253 |
| 6 | Sunrisers Hyderabad | 14 | 7 | 7 | 0 | 14 | −0.239 |
| 7 | Delhi Daredevils | 14 | 5 | 8 | 1 | 11 | −0.049 |
| 8 | Kings XI Punjab | 14 | 3 | 11 | 0 | 6 | −1.436 |

- Top 4 teams were qualified for the playoffs
- advanced to the Qualifier
- advanced to the Eliminator

("C" refers to the "Champions" of the Tournament. 'R'(2nd Position), '3' and '4' are the positions of the respective teams in the tournament.)

=== Match log ===
| No. | Date | Opponent | Venue | Result | Scorecard |
|---|---|---|---|---|---|
| 1 | April 10, 2015 | Rajasthan Royals | Pune | Lost by 26 runs | Scorecard |
| 2 | April 12, 2015 | Mumbai Indians | Mumbai | Won by 18 runs, MoM – George Bailey 61 (32) | Scorecard |
| 3 | April 15, 2015 | Delhi Daredevils | Pune | Lost by 5 wickets | Scorecard |
| 4 | April 18, 2015 | Kolkata Knight Riders | Pune | Lost by 4 wickets | Scorecard |
| 5 | April 21, 2015 | Rajasthan Royals | Ahmedabad | Match Tied, Won Super Over, MoM – Shaun Marsh 65 (40) | Scorecard |
| 6 | April 25, 2015 | Chennai Super Kings | Chennai | Lost by 98 runs | Scorecard |
| 7 | April 27, 2015 | Sunrisers Hyderabad | Mohali | Lost by 20 runs | Scorecard |
| 8 | May 1, 2015 | Delhi Daredevils | Delhi | Lost by 9 wickets | Scorecard |
| 9 | May 3, 2015 | Mumbai Indians | Mohali | Lost by 24 runs | Scorecard |
| 10 | May 6, 2015 | Royal Challengers Bangalore | Bengaluru | Lost by 139 runs | Scorecard |
| 11 | May 9, 2015 | Kolkata Knight Riders | Kolkata | Lost by 1 wicket | Scorecard |
| 12 | May 11, 2015 | Sunrisers Hyderabad | Hyderabad | Lost by 5 runs | Scorecard |
| 13 | May 13, 2015 | Royal Challengers Bangalore | Mohali | Won by 22 runs, MoM – Axar Patel 2/11 (4 overs) | Scorecard |
| 14 | May 16, 2015 | Chennai Super Kings | Mohali | Lost by 7 wickets | Scorecard |
Overall record: 3–11. Failed to advance.
