= 2015 Chennai Super Kings season =

Indian Premier League cricket team season

Chennai Super Kings
2015 season
- Coach: Stephen Fleming
- Captain: Mahendra Singh Dhoni
- Ground(s): M. A. Chidambaram Stadium, Chennai
- IPL: Runners-up
- CLT20: Defunct
- Most runs: Brendon McCullum (436)
- Most wickets: Dwayne Bravo (26)
- Most catches: Dwayne Bravo (13); Ravindra Jadeja (13)
- Most wicket-keeping dismissals: Mahendra Singh Dhoni (11)

Chennai Super Kings (CSK) is a franchise cricket team based in Chennai, India, which plays in the Indian Premier League (IPL). They were one of the eight teams that competed in the 2015 Indian Premier League. They were captained by Mahendra Singh Dhoni for the eight consecutive season.

The Super Kings reached the final of the 2015 IPL where they lost to Mumbai Indians.

== IPL auction 2015 ==
Chennai Super Kings bought the following players in the 2015 auction:

- Michael Hussey
- Irfan Pathan
- Rahul Sharma
- Kyle Abbott
- Andrew Tye
- Pratyush Singh
- Ankush Bains
- Eklavya Dwivedi

== Squad ==
- Players with international caps before the 2015 IPL season are listed in **bold**.

No.	Name	Nationality	Birth date	Batting style	Bowling style	Signed year	Salary	Notes
Batsmen
3	**Suresh Raina**	India	27 November 1986 (aged 28)	Left-handed	Right-arm off break	2014	₹9.5 crore (US$1.48 million)	Vice-captain
12	Mithun Manhas	India	12 October 1979 (aged 35)	Right-handed	Right-arm off break	2014	₹10 lakh (US$20,000)	
13	**Faf du Plessis**	South Africa	13 July 1984 (aged 30)	Right-handed	Right-arm leg break	2014	₹4.75 crore (US$740,000)	Overseas
42	**Brendon McCullum**	New Zealand	27 September 1981 (aged 33)	Right-handed	Right-arm medium	2014	₹3.25 crore (US$510,000)	Overseas
48	**Michael Hussey**	Australia	27 May 1975 (aged 39)	Left-handed	Right-arm medium	2015	₹1.5 crore (US$230,000)	Overseas
All-rounders
5	Baba Aparajith	India	8 July 1994 (aged 20)	Right-handed	Right-arm off break	2014	₹30 lakh (US$50,000)	
8	**Ravindra Jadeja**	India	6 December 1988 (aged 26)	Left-handed	Slow left-arm orthodox	2014	₹7.5 crore (US$1.17 million)	
47	**Dwayne Bravo**	Trinidad and Tobago	7 October 1983 (aged 31)	Right-handed	Right-arm medium-fast	2014	₹4 crore (US$620,000)	Overseas
50	**Dwayne Smith**	Barbados	12 April 1983 (aged 32)	Right-handed	Right-arm medium-fast	2014	₹4.5 crore (US$700,000)	Overseas
56	**Irfan Pathan**	India	27 October 1984 (aged 30)	Left-handed	Left-arm medium-fast	2015	₹1.5 crore (US$230,000)	
68	Andrew Tye	Australia	12 December 1986 (aged 28)	Right-handed	Right-arm medium-fast	2015	₹20 lakh (US$30,000)	Overseas
Wicket-keepers
1	Eklavya Dwivedi	India	22 July 1988 (aged 26)	Right-handed		2015	₹10 lakh (US$20,000)	
7	**Mahendra Singh Dhoni**	India	7 July 1981 (aged 33)	Right-handed	Right-arm medium	2014	₹12.5 crore (US$1.95 million)	Captain
9	Ankush Bains	India	6 December 1995 (aged 19)	Right-handed		2015	₹10 lakh (US$20,000)	
Bowlers
6	Pawan Negi	India	6 January 1993 (aged 22)	Left-handed	Slow left-arm orthodox	2014	₹10 lakh (US$20,000)	
15	Ishwar Pandey	India	15 August 1989 (aged 25)	Right-handed	Right-arm medium-fast	2014	₹1.5 crore (US$230,000)	
18	**Mohit Sharma**	India	18 September 1988 (aged 26)	Right-handed	Right-arm medium-fast	2014	₹3 crore (US$470,000)	
19	Pratyush Singh	India	4 September 1994 (aged 20)	Right-handed	Right-arm leg break googly	2015	₹10 lakh (US$20,000)	
21	**Matt Henry**	New Zealand	14 December 1991 (aged 23)	Right-handed	Right-arm fast-medium	2014	₹30 lakh (US$50,000)	Overseas
22	Ronit More	India	11 February 1992 (aged 23)	Right-handed	Right arm medium-fast	2014	₹10 lakh (US$20,000)	
27	**Rahul Sharma**	India	30 September 1986 (aged 28)	Right-handed	Right-arm leg break googly	2015	₹30 lakh (US$50,000)	
64	**Ashish Nehra**	India	30 April 1979 (aged 35)	Right-handed	Left-arm medium-fast	2014	₹2 crore (US$310,000)	
77	**Samuel Badree**	Trinidad and Tobago	9 March 1981 (aged 34)	Right-handed	Right-arm leg break	2014	₹30 lakh (US$50,000)	Overseas
87	**Kyle Abbott**	South Africa	18 June 1987 (aged 27)	Right-handed	Right-arm fast-medium	2015	₹30 lakh (US$50,000)	Overseas
99	**Ravichandran Ashwin**	India	17 September 1986 (aged 28)	Right-handed	Right-arm off break	2014	₹5.5 crore (US$860,000)	

== IPL ==
=== Standings ===
Chennai Super Kings finished first in the league stage of IPL 2015.

Pos	Team	Pld	W	L	NR	Pts	NRR
1	Chennai Super Kings (R)	14	9	5	0	18	0.709
2	Mumbai Indians (C)	14	8	6	0	16	−0.043
3	Royal Challengers Bangalore (3)	14	7	5	2	16	1.037
4	Rajasthan Royals (4)	14	7	5	2	16	0.062
5	Kolkata Knight Riders	14	7	6	1	15	0.253
6	Sunrisers Hyderabad	14	7	7	0	14	−0.239
7	Delhi Daredevils	14	5	8	1	11	−0.049
8	Kings XI Punjab	14	3	11	0	6	−1.436

- Top 4 teams were qualified for the playoffs
- advanced to the Qualifier
- advanced to the Eliminator

("C" refers to the "Champions" of the Tournament. 'R'(2nd Position), '3' and '4' are the positions of the respective teams in the tournament.)

=== Results ===
==== League matches ====
9 April	(H) Chennai Super Kings; 150/7 (20 overs)	v	Delhi Daredevils; 149/9 (20 overs)	Chennai Super Kings won by 1 runs
20:00 (D/N); Scorecard	(H) Chennai Super Kings; 150/7 (20 overs)	v	Delhi Daredevils; 149/9 (20 overs)	M A Chidambaram Stadium, Chennai; Umpires: Richard Illingworth (Eng) and Vineet Kulkarni (Ind); Player of the match: Ashish Nehra (CSK)
20:00 (D/N); Scorecard	Dwayne Smith 34 (31); Nathan Coulter-Nile 3/30 (4 overs)		Albie Morkel 73* (55); Ashish Nehra 3/25 (4 overs)	M A Chidambaram Stadium, Chennai; Umpires: Richard Illingworth (Eng) and Vineet Kulkarni (Ind); Player of the match: Ashish Nehra (CSK)
Delhi Daredevils won the toss and elected to field				M A Chidambaram Stadium, Chennai; Umpires: Richard Illingworth (Eng) and Vineet Kulkarni (Ind); Player of the match: Ashish Nehra (CSK)

11 April	(H) Chennai Super Kings; 209/4 (20 overs)	v	Sunrisers Hyderabad; 164/6 (20 overs)	Chennai Super Kings won by 45 runs
16:00 (D/N); Scorecard	(H) Chennai Super Kings; 209/4 (20 overs)	v	Sunrisers Hyderabad; 164/6 (20 overs)	M A Chidambaram Stadium, Chennai; Umpires: Richard Illingworth (Eng) and Vineet Kulkarni (Ind); Player of the match: Brendon McCullum (CSK)
16:00 (D/N); Scorecard	Brendon McCullum 100* (56); Trent Boult 1/34 (4 overs)		David Warner 53 (42); Dwayne Bravo 2/25 (4 overs)	M A Chidambaram Stadium, Chennai; Umpires: Richard Illingworth (Eng) and Vineet Kulkarni (Ind); Player of the match: Brendon McCullum (CSK)
Chennai Super Kings won the toss and elected to bat				M A Chidambaram Stadium, Chennai; Umpires: Richard Illingworth (Eng) and Vineet Kulkarni (Ind); Player of the match: Brendon McCullum (CSK)

17 April	(H) Mumbai Indians; 183/7 (20 overs)	v	Chennai Super Kings; 189/4 (16.4 overs)	Chennai Super Kings won by 6 wickets
20:00 (D/N); Scorecard	(H) Mumbai Indians; 183/7 (20 overs)	v	Chennai Super Kings; 189/4 (16.4 overs)	Wankhede Stadium, Mumbai; Umpires: Anil Chaudhary (Ind) and Marais Erasmus (SA); Player of the match: Ashish Nehra (CSK)
20:00 (D/N); Scorecard	Kieron Pollard 64 (30); Ashish Nehra 3/23 (4 overs)		Dwayne Smith 62 (30); Harbhajan Singh 2/44 (4 overs)	Wankhede Stadium, Mumbai; Umpires: Anil Chaudhary (Ind) and Marais Erasmus (SA); Player of the match: Ashish Nehra (CSK)
Mumbai Indians won the toss and elected to bat				Wankhede Stadium, Mumbai; Umpires: Anil Chaudhary (Ind) and Marais Erasmus (SA); Player of the match: Ashish Nehra (CSK)

19 April	Chennai Super Kings; 156/4 (20 overs)	v	Rajasthan Royals (H); 157/2 (18.2 overs)	Rajasthan Royals won by 8 wickets
16:00 (D/N); Scorecard	Chennai Super Kings; 156/4 (20 overs)	v	Rajasthan Royals (H); 157/2 (18.2 overs)	Sardar Patel Stadium, Ahmedabad; Umpires: Marais Erasmus (SA) and Anil Chaudhary (Ind); Player of the match: Ajinkya Rahane (RR)
16:00 (D/N); Scorecard	Dwayne Bravo 62* (36); Chris Morris 1/19 (4 overs)		Ajinkya Rahane 76* (55); Ravindra Jadeja 1/29 (4 overs)	Sardar Patel Stadium, Ahmedabad; Umpires: Marais Erasmus (SA) and Anil Chaudhary (Ind); Player of the match: Ajinkya Rahane (RR)
Chennai Super Kings won the toss and elected to bat				Sardar Patel Stadium, Ahmedabad; Umpires: Marais Erasmus (SA) and Anil Chaudhary (Ind); Player of the match: Ajinkya Rahane (RR)

22 April	Chennai Super Kings; 181/8 (20 overs)	v	Royal Challengers Bangalore (H); 154/8 (20 overs)	Chennai Super Kings won by 27 runs
20:00 (D/N); Scorecard	Chennai Super Kings; 181/8 (20 overs)	v	Royal Challengers Bangalore (H); 154/8 (20 overs)	M Chinnaswamy Stadium, Bangalore; Umpires: Johan Cloete (SA) and Chettithody Shamshuddin (Ind); Player of the match: Suresh Raina (CSK)
20:00 (D/N); Scorecard	Suresh Raina 62 (32); Yuzvendra Chahal 3/40 (4 overs)		Virat Kohli 51 (42); Ashish Nehra 4/10 (4 overs)	M Chinnaswamy Stadium, Bangalore; Umpires: Johan Cloete (SA) and Chettithody Shamshuddin (Ind); Player of the match: Suresh Raina (CSK)
Royal Challengers Bangalore won the toss and elected to field				M Chinnaswamy Stadium, Bangalore; Umpires: Johan Cloete (SA) and Chettithody Shamshuddin (Ind); Player of the match: Suresh Raina (CSK)

25 April	(H) Chennai Super Kings; 192/3 (20 overs)	v	Kings XI Punjab; 95/9 (20 overs)	Chennai Super Kings won by 97 runs
20:00 (D/N); Scorecard	(H) Chennai Super Kings; 192/3 (20 overs)	v	Kings XI Punjab; 95/9 (20 overs)	M A Chidambaram Stadium, Chennai; Umpires: Johan Cloete (SA) and Chettithody Shamshuddin (Ind); Player of the match: Brendon McCullum (CSK)
20:00 (D/N); Scorecard	Brendon McCullum 66 (44); Axar Patel 1/35 (4 overs)		Murali Vijay 34 (32); Ravindra Jadeja 3/22 (4 overs)	M A Chidambaram Stadium, Chennai; Umpires: Johan Cloete (SA) and Chettithody Shamshuddin (Ind); Player of the match: Brendon McCullum (CSK)
Chennai Super Kings won the toss and elected to bat				M A Chidambaram Stadium, Chennai; Umpires: Johan Cloete (SA) and Chettithody Shamshuddin (Ind); Player of the match: Brendon McCullum (CSK)

28 April	(H) Chennai Super Kings; 134/6 (20 overs)	v	Kolkata Knight Riders; 132/9 (20 overs)	Chennai Super Kings won by 2 runs
20:00 (D/N); Scorecard	(H) Chennai Super Kings; 134/6 (20 overs)	v	Kolkata Knight Riders; 132/9 (20 overs)	M A Chidambaram Stadium, Chennai; Umpires: Rajesh Deshpande (Ind) and Vineet Kulkarni (Ind); Player of the match: Dwayne Bravo (CSK)
20:00 (D/N); Scorecard	Faf du Plessis 29* (29); Andre Russell, Piyush Chawla 2/26 (4 overs)		Robin Uthappa 39 (17); Dwayne Bravo 3/22 (3 overs)	M A Chidambaram Stadium, Chennai; Umpires: Rajesh Deshpande (Ind) and Vineet Kulkarni (Ind); Player of the match: Dwayne Bravo (CSK)
Kolkata Knight Riders won the toss and elected to field				M A Chidambaram Stadium, Chennai; Umpires: Rajesh Deshpande (Ind) and Vineet Kulkarni (Ind); Player of the match: Dwayne Bravo (CSK)

30 April	Chennai Super Kings; 165/9 (20 overs)	v	Kolkata Knight Riders (H); 169/3 (19.5 overs)	Kolkata Knight Riders won by 7 wickets
20:00 (D/N); Scorecard	Chennai Super Kings; 165/9 (20 overs)	v	Kolkata Knight Riders (H); 169/3 (19.5 overs)	Eden Gardens, Kolkata; Umpires: Anil Chaudhary (Ind) and Marais Erasmus (SA); Player of the match: Andre Russell (KKR)
20:00 (D/N); Scorecard	Brendon McCullum 32 (12); Brad Hogg 4/29 (4 overs)		Robin Uthappa 80* (58); Mohit Sharma 1/22 (4 overs)	Eden Gardens, Kolkata; Umpires: Anil Chaudhary (Ind) and Marais Erasmus (SA); Player of the match: Andre Russell (KKR)
Kolkata Knight Riders won the toss and elected to field				Eden Gardens, Kolkata; Umpires: Anil Chaudhary (Ind) and Marais Erasmus (SA); Player of the match: Andre Russell (KKR)

2 May	(H) Sunrisers Hyderabad; 192/7 (20 overs)	v	Chennai Super Kings; 170/6 (20 overs)	Sunrisers Hyderabad won by 22 runs
20:00 (D/N); Scorecard	(H) Sunrisers Hyderabad; 192/7 (20 overs)	v	Chennai Super Kings; 170/6 (20 overs)	Rajiv Gandhi International Cricket Stadium, Hyderabad; Umpires: Anil Chaudhary (Ind) and Krishnamachari Srinivasan (Ind); Player of the match: David Warner (SRH)
20:00 (D/N); Scorecard	David Warner 61 (28); Dwayne Bravo 3/25 (4 overs)		Faf du Plessis 33 (22); Moises Henriques 2/20 (4 overs)	Rajiv Gandhi International Cricket Stadium, Hyderabad; Umpires: Anil Chaudhary (Ind) and Krishnamachari Srinivasan (Ind); Player of the match: David Warner (SRH)
Chennai Super Kings won the toss and elected to field				Rajiv Gandhi International Cricket Stadium, Hyderabad; Umpires: Anil Chaudhary (Ind) and Krishnamachari Srinivasan (Ind); Player of the match: David Warner (SRH)

4 May	(H) Chennai Super Kings; 148/9 (20 overs)	v	Royal Challengers Bangalore; 124 (19.4 overs)	Chennai Super Kings won by 24 runs
16:00 (D/N); Scorecard	(H) Chennai Super Kings; 148/9 (20 overs)	v	Royal Challengers Bangalore; 124 (19.4 overs)	M A Chidambaram Stadium, Chennai; Umpires: Chettithody Shamshuddin (Ind) and Krishnaraj Srinath (Ind); Player of the match: Suresh Raina (CSK)
16:00 (D/N); Scorecard	Suresh Raina 52 (46); Mitchell Starc 3/24 (4 overs)		Virat Kohli 48 (44); Ashish Nehra 3/19 (4 overs)	M A Chidambaram Stadium, Chennai; Umpires: Chettithody Shamshuddin (Ind) and Krishnaraj Srinath (Ind); Player of the match: Suresh Raina (CSK)
Chennai Super Kings won the toss and elected to bat				M A Chidambaram Stadium, Chennai; Umpires: Chettithody Shamshuddin (Ind) and Krishnaraj Srinath (Ind); Player of the match: Suresh Raina (CSK)

8 May	(H) Chennai Super Kings; 158/5 (20 overs)	v	Mumbai Indians; 159/4 (19.2 overs)	Mumbai Indians won by 6 wickets
20:00 (D/N); Scorecard	(H) Chennai Super Kings; 158/5 (20 overs)	v	Mumbai Indians; 159/4 (19.2 overs)	M A Chidambaram Stadium, Chennai; Umpires: Chris Gaffaney (NZ) and CK Nandan (Ind); Player of the match: Hardik Pandya (MI)
20:00 (D/N); Scorecard	Mahendra Singh Dhoni 39 (32); Jagadeesha Suchith 1/21 (4 overs)		Parthiv Patel 45 (32); Ravichandran Ashwin 2/17 (4 overs)	M A Chidambaram Stadium, Chennai; Umpires: Chris Gaffaney (NZ) and CK Nandan (Ind); Player of the match: Hardik Pandya (MI)
Chennai Super Kings won the toss and elected to bat				M A Chidambaram Stadium, Chennai; Umpires: Chris Gaffaney (NZ) and CK Nandan (Ind); Player of the match: Hardik Pandya (MI)

10 May	(H) Chennai Super Kings; 157/5 (20 overs)	v	Rajasthan Royals; 145/9 (20 overs)	Chennai Super Kings won by 12 runs
20:00 (D/N); Scorecard	(H) Chennai Super Kings; 157/5 (20 overs)	v	Rajasthan Royals; 145/9 (20 overs)	M A Chidambaram Stadium, Chennai; Umpires: Marais Erasmus (SA)and CK Nandan (Ind); Player of the match: Ravindra Jadeja (CSK)
20:00 (D/N); Scorecard	Brendon McCullum 81 (61); Chris Morris 3/19 (4 overs)		Shane Watson 28 (30); Ravindra Jadeja 4/11 (4 overs)	M A Chidambaram Stadium, Chennai; Umpires: Marais Erasmus (SA)and CK Nandan (Ind); Player of the match: Ravindra Jadeja (CSK)
Chennai Super Kings won the toss and elected to bat				M A Chidambaram Stadium, Chennai; Umpires: Marais Erasmus (SA)and CK Nandan (Ind); Player of the match: Ravindra Jadeja (CSK)

12 May	Chennai Super Kings; 119/6 (20 overs)	v	Delhi Daredevils (H); 120/4 (16.4 overs)	Delhi Daredevils won by 6 wickets
20:00 (D/N); Scorecard	Chennai Super Kings; 119/6 (20 overs)	v	Delhi Daredevils (H); 120/4 (16.4 overs)	Chhattisgarh International Cricket Stadium, Raipur; Umpires: Richard Illingworth (Eng) and Vineet Kulkarni (Ind); Player of the match: Zaheer Khan (DD)
20:00 (D/N); Scorecard	Faf du Plessis 29 (23); Zaheer Khan 2/9 (4 overs)		Shreyas Iyer 70* (49); Ishwar Pandey 2/27 (4 overs)	Chhattisgarh International Cricket Stadium, Raipur; Umpires: Richard Illingworth (Eng) and Vineet Kulkarni (Ind); Player of the match: Zaheer Khan (DD)
Chennai Super Kings won the toss and elected to bat				Chhattisgarh International Cricket Stadium, Raipur; Umpires: Richard Illingworth (Eng) and Vineet Kulkarni (Ind); Player of the match: Zaheer Khan (DD)

16 May	(H) Kings XI Punjab; 130/7 (20 overs)	v	Chennai Super Kings; 134/3 (16.5 overs)	Chennai Super Kings won by 7 wickets
16:00 (D/N); Scorecard	(H) Kings XI Punjab; 130/7 (20 overs)	v	Chennai Super Kings; 134/3 (16.5 overs)	Punjab Cricket Association Stadium, Mohali; Umpires: CK Nandan (Ind) and Chettithody Shamshuddin (Ind); Player of the match: Pawan Negi (CSK)
16:00 (D/N); Scorecard	Axar Patel 32 (29); Pawan Negi 2/25 (4 overs)		Faf du Plessis 55 (41); Sandeep Sharma 1/9 (2 overs)	Punjab Cricket Association Stadium, Mohali; Umpires: CK Nandan (Ind) and Chettithody Shamshuddin (Ind); Player of the match: Pawan Negi (CSK)
Kings XI Punjab won the toss and elected to bat				Punjab Cricket Association Stadium, Mohali; Umpires: CK Nandan (Ind) and Chettithody Shamshuddin (Ind); Player of the match: Pawan Negi (CSK)

==== Playoffs ====
Semifinals
19 May — Wankhede Stadium, Mumbai
1	Chennai Super Kings	162 (19 ov)
2	Mumbai Indians (H)	187/6 (20 ov)
20 May — MCA Stadium, Pune
3	Royal Challengers Bangalore	180/4 (20 ov)
4	Rajasthan Royals	109 (19 ov)

Preliminary final
22 May — JSCA International Cricket Stadium, Ranchi
1	Chennai Super Kings	140/7 (19.5 ov)
3	Royal Challengers Bangalore	139/8 (20 ov)

Final
24 May — Eden Gardens, Kolkata
2	Mumbai Indians	202/5 (20 ov)
1	Chennai Super Kings	161/8 (20 ov)

Qualifier 1

19 May
20:00 (D/N)
Scorecard

(H) Mumbai Indians; 187/6 (20 overs)	v	Chennai Super Kings; 162 (19 overs)
Lendl Simmons 65 (51); Dwayne Bravo 3/40 (4 overs)		Faf du Plessis 45 (34); Lasith Malinga 3/23 (4 overs)

Mumbai Indians won by 25 runs
Wankhede Stadium, Mumbai
Umpires: Kumar Dharmasena (SL) and Richard Illingworth (Eng)
Player of the match: Kieron Pollard (MI)

- Mumbai Indians won the toss and elected to bat

Qualifier 2

22 May
20:00 (D/N)
Scorecard

Royal Challengers Bangalore; 139/8 (20 overs)	v	Chennai Super Kings; 140/7 (19.5 overs)
Chris Gayle 41 (43); Ashish Nehra 3/28 (4 overs)		Michael Hussey 56 (46); Yuzvendra Chahal 2/28 (4 overs)

Chennai Super Kings won by 3 wickets
JSCA International Cricket Stadium, Ranchi
Umpires: Anil Chaudhary (Ind) and Chris Gaffaney (NZ)
Player of the match: Ashish Nehra (CSK)

- Chennai Super Kings won the toss and elected to field

==== Final ====
24 May
20:00 (D/N)
Scorecard

Mumbai Indians; 202/5 (20 overs)	v	Chennai Super Kings; 161/8 (20 overs)
Lendl Simmons 68 (45); Dwayne Bravo 2/36 (4 overs)		Dwayne Smith 57 (48); Mitchell McClenaghan 3/25 (4 overs)

Mumbai Indians won by 41 runs
Eden Gardens, Kolkata
Umpires: Kumar Dharmasena (SL) and Richard Illingworth (Eng)
Player of the match: Rohit Sharma (MI)

- Chennai Super Kings won the toss and elected to field

== Statistics ==
=== Most runs ===
Player	Mat	Inns	Runs	Ave	SR	HS	100	50	4s	6s
Brendon McCullum	14	14	436	33.53	155.71	100	1	2	51	23
Dwayne Smith	16	16	399	24.93	119.10	62	0	2	52	16
Faf du Plessis	17	15	280	29.23	125.00	55	0	1	37	5

- Source: ESPNcricinfo

=== Most wickets ===
Player	Mat	Inns	Wkts	Ave	Econ	BBI	SR	4WI	5WI
Dwayne Bravo	17	16	26	16.38	8.14	3/22	12.00	0	0
Ashish Nehra	16	16	22	20.40	7.24	4/10	16.90	1	0
Mohit Sharma	16	16	14	34.35	8.43	3/25	24.40	0	0

- Bravo won the Purple Cap award as the player who took the most wickets in the tournament
- Source: ESPNcricinfo
