= Xavier Gabriel =

Saint Lucian cricketer (born 1985)

Personal information
- Full name: Xavier Peter Gabriel
- Born: 18 December 1985 (age 40); Saint Lucia
- Batting: Right-handed
- Bowling: Right-arm fast-medium

Domestic team information
- Years: Team
- 2005–2013: Windward Islands
- Source: CricketArchive, 20 January 2016

Xavier Peter Gabriel (born 18 December 1985) is a Saint Lucian cricketer who has played for the Windward Islands in West Indian domestic cricket. He is a right-arm pace bowler.

Gabriel made his first-class debut for the Windwards in March 2005, playing against Jamaica in the 2004–05 Carib Beer Cup. After his debut, he did not play another match for the team until April 2013, when he played against the Leeward Islands in the 2012–13 Regional Four Day Competition. He was wicketless in both games. In between appearances for the Windward Islands, Gabriel spent the 2006 off-season playing club cricket in England, also playing a single game for Worcestershire in the Second XI Championship. He also played for the Saint Lucian national team at the 2008 Stanford 20/20, making appearances against the Cayman Islands and Trinidad and Tobago.
