= Akeel Seetal =

West Indian cricketer (born 1997)

Akeel Marc Seetal
Personal information
- Born: 3 July 1997 (age 29); Trinidad
- Source: Cricinfo, 7 November 2017

Akeel Seetal (born 3 July 1997) is a West Indian cricketer. He played his only List A cricket match for West Indies under-19 cricket team in the Nagico Super50 2014–2015 on 18 January 2015.
