= Akeel Al Saffar =

Iraqi politician

His Excellency Akeel Al Saffar

Deputy Minister of National Security Affairs
- In office 2005-2018

Personal details
- Born: Baghdad, Iraq
- Died: 15 April 2021 London, United Kingdom
- Party: Independent

Akeel Al Saffar (or Aqeel; Arabic: عقيل الصفار; died 15 April 2021) was an Iraqi politician. Al Saffar lived in exile for decades, opposing the regime of Saddam Hussein. He was Deputy Minister for National Security Affairs from 2004 to 2018.

He was a senior figure in the Iraqi National Accord political party.

On 15 April 2021 he died in London of an illness.
