= Craig Emmanuel =

West Indian cricketer (born 1986)

Personal information
- Full name: Craig Walt Emmanuel
- Born: 5 May 1986 (age 39); St Lucia
- Batting: Right-handed
- Bowling: Right-arm off break
- Role: Batsman

Domestic team information
- Years: Team
- 2003–04: West Indies U-19
- Windward Islands

Craig Walt Emmanuel (born 5 May 1986 in St Lucia) is a West Indian cricketer who plays first class cricket for Windward Islands. He made his debut in the 2003–04 season by playing three games for West Indies U-19. At the conclusion of the 2005–06 season, he has played 19 first class and 15 List A games, all for the Windward Islands apart from the three one-day games for the U-19 side. Emmanuel has played as a specialist batsman, and his highest score in senior top-level cricket is 73.
