= Taryck Gabriel =

Saint Lucian cricketer (born 1995)

Personal information
- Born: 6 April 1995 (age 31); Saint Lucia
- Source: ESPNcricinfo, 10 December 2016

Taryck Gabriel (born 6 April 1995) is a Saint Lucian cricketer. He made his first-class debut for the Windward Islands in the 2016–17 Regional Four Day Competition on 9 December 2016.
