= Dwayne Bravo =

West Indies cricketer

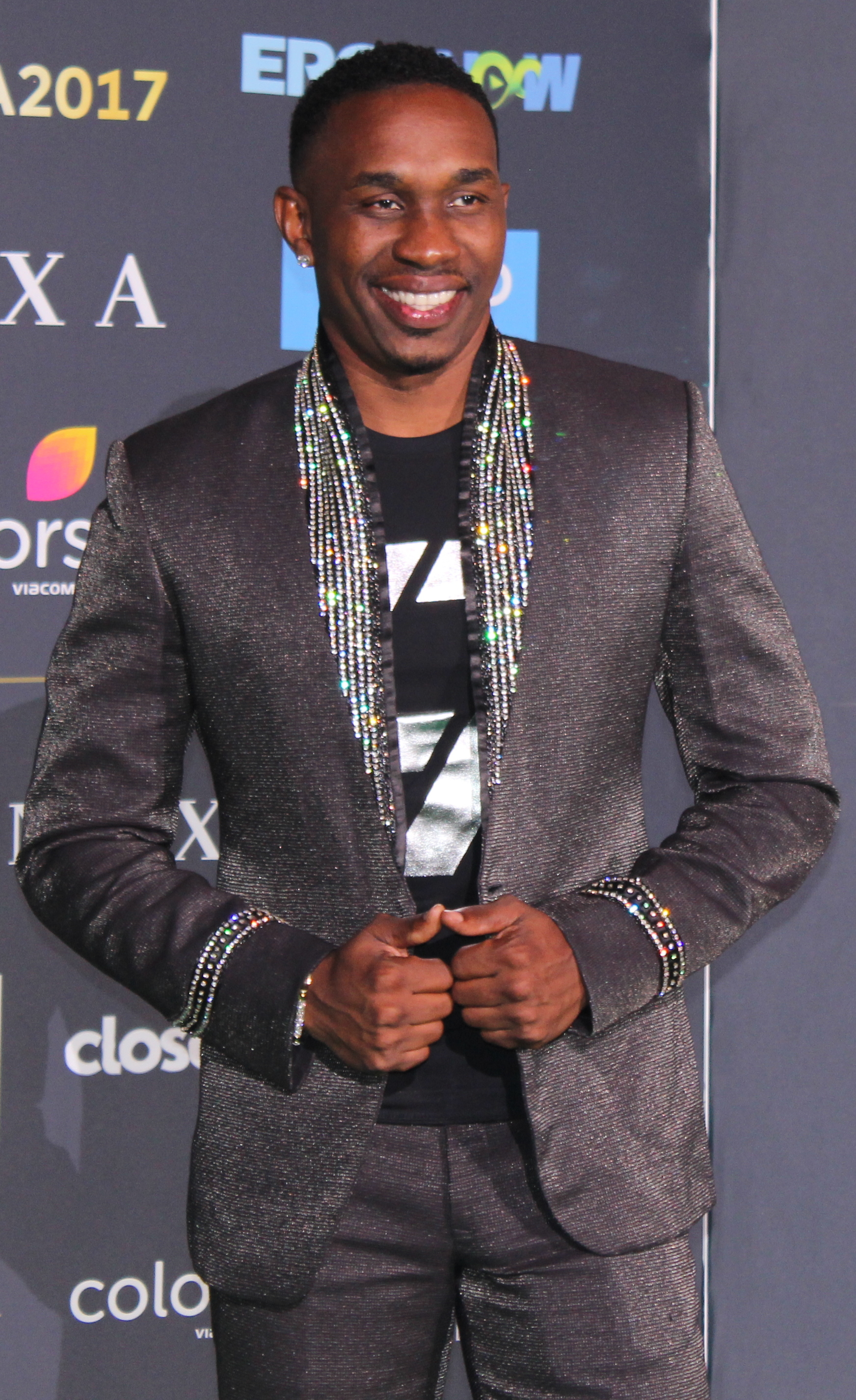
- Bravo at the 2017 International Indian Film Academy Awards

Personal information
- Full name: Dwayne John Bravo
- Born: 7 October 1983 (age 43); Santa Cruz, Trinidad and Tobago
- Nickname: DJ Bravo
- Height: 5 ft 9 in (1.75 m)
- Batting: Right-handed
- Bowling: Right-arm medium-fast
- Role: All-rounder
- Relatives: Darren Bravo (half-brother)

International information
- National side: West Indies (2004–2021)
- Test debut (cap 256): 22 July 2004 v England
- Last Test: 1 December 2010 v Sri Lanka
- ODI debut (cap 121): 18 April 2004 v England
- Last ODI: 17 October 2014 v India
- ODI shirt no.: 47
- T20I debut (cap 2): 16 February 2006 v New Zealand
- Last T20I: 6 November 2021 v Australia
- T20I shirt no.: 47

Domestic team information
- Years: Team
- 2001/02–2018/19: Trinidad and Tobago (Note: Not every team that Bravo has played for is listed here. Only teams which he appeared for in more than one season are included in the list.)
- 2008–2010: Mumbai Indians
- 2009/10–2010/11: Victoria
- 2011–2015, 2018-2022: Chennai Super Kings
- 2013–2020, 2023-2024: Trinbago Knight Riders
- 2013/14–2017/18: Melbourne Renegades
- 2014/15–2015/16: Dolphins
- 2016–2017: Gujarat Lions
- 2021–2022: St Kitts and Nevis Patriots
- 2023–2024: Texas Super Kings

Career statistics
Competition	Test	ODI	T20I	FC
Matches	40	164	91	100
Runs scored	2,200	2,968	1,255	5,302
Batting average	31.42	25.36	22.01	30.64
100s/50s	3/13	2/10	0/4	8/30
Top score	113	112*	66*	197
Balls bowled	6,466	6,511	1,505	11,025
Wickets	86	199	78	177
Bowling average	39.83	29.51	26.10	33.43
5 wickets in innings	2	1	0	7
10 wickets in match	0	0	0	0
Best bowling	6/55	6/43	4/19	6/11
Catches/stumpings	41/0	73/0	44/0	89/0
Medal record
Men's Cricket
Representing West Indies
ICC Champions Trophy
Winner	2004 England
ICC Men's T20 World Cup
Winner	2012 Sri Lanka
Winner	2016 India
- Source: ESPNcricinfo, 7 January 2024

Dwayne John "DJ" Bravo (born 7 October 1983) is a Trinidadian retired cricketer, former captain of the West Indies cricket team and the current mentor of Kolkata Knight Riders as well as the head coach of the other teams of the Knight Riders Group, including Trinbago Knight Riders. A right-arm seam bowling all-rounder, Bravo was well known for his aggressive lower-order batting and for his bowling in the final overs of a match. During his prime, he was regarded as one of the best death bowlers in T20 cricket. He also performs as a singer.

Between 2004 and 2021, Bravo represented in 40 Test matches, 164 ODI matches and 91 T20I matches for the West Indies. He was a key member of the West Indies team that won the 2004 ICC Champions Trophy, the 2012 ICC World Twenty20 (where he took the winning catch), and the 2016 ICC World Twenty20. After initially announcing his retirement from international cricket in October 2018, he came out of retirement in December 2019 in preparation for the 2020 T20 World Cup.

In domestic cricket, Bravo has played for his native Trinidad and Tobago since 2002. He played for a number of other teams in leagues around the world until his retirement in September 2024.

== Early career ==
Bravo made his first-class debut for Trinidad and Tobago against Barbados in 2002, opening the innings and scoring 15 and 16 but not bowling. He scored his maiden first-class century a month later and was included in the West Indies A squad for their tour of England in 2002. In early 2003 he scored another century but it was a spell of bowling in which he took 6–11 against the Windward Islands that brought him to prominence as an all-rounder.

== International career ==
Bravo made his One Day International debut against England in their 2003/04 tour of the Caribbean, in a match in which he failed to bat but took 2–31 with the ball. In the West Indies tour of England in 2004 Bravo made his Test debut when he was selected for the First Test at Lord's in which he scored 44 and 10 and took three wickets. He finished the Test series with 16 wickets and a total of 220 runs with his most impressive performance at Old Trafford in a match in which he was the top scorer in the first innings with 77 followed by an 6 for 55 performance with the ball. The latter remains his best bowling figures in Test cricket.

During a Test series against South Africa in 2005, Bravo scored his maiden century – 107 before getting out to Mark Boucher – in the fourth Test in Antigua, but that was overshadowed when he accused South African Graeme Smith of directing a racist comment at him. At the subsequent hearing no evidence could be found and charges were dropped against Smith, who immediately demanded an apology from Bravo. Bravo, backed by the West Indies Cricket Board, refused to do so and received a hail of criticism from an indignant South African press while finding support at home as a human rights campaigner.

=== Years through injuries ===
On the West Indies tour of Australia in 2005, Bravo was controversially not picked for the first Test at Brisbane in which the West Indies were beaten convincingly. He was recalled for the second Test in Hobart and made a superb 113, after coming in at a very difficult stage for the West Indies. His innings lifted the West Indies and helped them regain some pride, forcing the Australians to bat for a second time in the match. In the third and final match of the series at Adelaide, he bowled a superb spell in the Australians first innings taking 6 for 84.

In West Indies tour of New Zealand in early 2006 Bravo strained his left side in the Twenty20 game at the start of the tour and was unable to bowl but still played in all three tests as a specialist batsman. His selection showed how far he had come in the previous two years and how crucial he had become to the West Indies team.

=== Comeback in 2006 ===
After a disappointing series in India Bravo returned to top form in the ICC Champions Trophy 2006 when he took 7 wickets at an average of 27.57 and scored 164 runs at an average of 41 although most of the runs were scored in a dead rubber match with England in which he made his first ever ODI century scoring a majestic 112 not out as part of a second wicket stand of 174 with Chris Gayle. His bowling contained some lethal slower-paced yorkers with which he dismissed Michael Clarke and Chris Read.

During the Third Test against England at Old Trafford on 9 June 2007, Bravo acted as an emergency wicket-keeper in place of Denesh Ramdin who had gone off for treatment after being hit on the head with the ball. In the same Test he took the wicket of England batsman Kevin Pietersen with a bouncer which struck the batsman's helmet knocking the helmet off of his head onto the stumps and dislodging the bails causing Pietersen to be given out hit wicket.

=== World Cups ===
Bravo played in all of West Indies games at the 2007 Cricket World Cup in the West Indies. He had a disappointing World Cup scoring 129 runs at an average of 21.50 and although he took 13 wickets at 27.76 his economy rate was 5.56. Against South Africa he conceded 69 runs off 7 overs including 18 off his first over.

He played in all West Indies games at the 2009 T20I World Cup and was named in the 'Team of the Tournament' by ESPNcricinfo for the 2009 T20I World Cup.

He was ruled out from the 2011 Cricket World Cup in India due to the knee injury when he slipped at the wicket while bowling to South African batsman on 24 February 2011 at Delhi. He was rested for four weeks and could not participate further in the tournament.

He played in all of West Indies games at the 2012 ICC World Twenty20 in Sri Lanka, which the West Indies won. He played most of the tournament as a batsman as injury prevented him from bowling. For his performances in 2012, he was named in the T20I XI of the year by ESPNcricinfo.

In 2014, during a tour of India, Bravo was spokesman for the players during players strike which resulted in the tour being cancelled half way. He was later omitted from the West Indies World Cup squad for the 2015 Cricket World Cup in Australia and New Zealand. The West Indies struggled in his absence, especially in the bowling department.

He then played in all of West Indies games at the 2016 ICC World Twenty20 in India, which the West Indies won. His high quality death bowling is considered to be one of the main reasons that the West Indies won the title. He was named in the 'Team of the Tournament' by Cricbuzz.

In May 2019, Cricket West Indies (CWI) named him as one of ten reserve players in the West Indies' squad for the 2019 Cricket World Cup.

=== Retirement and another comeback ===
On 31 January 2015, Bravo announced his retirement from Test cricket. In October 2018, he announced his retirement from international cricket in all formats but will continue to play franchise T20 cricket. In December 2019, Bravo came out of international retirement in preparation for the 2020 T20 World Cup.

In September 2021, Bravo was named in the West Indies' squad for the 2021 ICC Men's T20 World Cup.

On 6 November 2021, Bravo retired from international cricket and played his last T20I match against Australia in the Sheikh Zayed Cricket Stadium. He continued to play league cricket across the globe until he announced his retirement from all forms of cricket on 27 September 2024.

== T20 Franchise career ==
=== Indian Premier League ===
Dwayne Bravo played for the Mumbai Indians in the Indian Premier League for the first three seasons. He was picked up by the Chennai Super Kings during 2011 IPL Auctions. He was one of the top performing players in the 2012 IPL playing for Chennai Super Kings scoring 371 runs at an average of 46.38 with a strike rate of 140. He also performed well in the 2013 IPL playing for Chennai Super Kings, taking 32 wickets at an average of 9.15 to win the Purple Cap and overthrow Albie Morkel to become Chennai Super Kings's leading wicket taker. During IPL 2014 he sustained a shoulder injury in the first match against Kings XI Punjab and was subsequently ruled out of the remaining matches. He launched his music single "Chalo Chalo" in Chennai on 3 May 2015.

He performed well in the 2015 IPL playing for Chennai Super Kings, taking 26 wickets and winning the purple cap for a second time. He is one of the two men who have won 2 purple caps. On the occasion of the 10-year anniversary of IPL, he was also named in the all-time ESPNcricinfo IPL XI After the suspension of Chennai Super Kings for 2 years, he was bought by Gujarat Lions. Later in 2018 IPL he was retained for 64.0 million by Chennai Super Kings again. In 2019 IPL too, he was again retained by Chennai Super Kings. He didn't put up a very good performance that year, but he impressed with his tight bowling in the death overs. The following season while playing for Chennai, Bravo suffered a groin injury which ruled him out of the back end of the tournament.

In the 2022 IPL Auction, Dwayne was bought by the Chennai Super Kings for ₹4.40 crores. On 2 Dec 2022, he announced his retirement from IPL, and subsequently replaced Lakshmipathy Balaji as the bowling coach of the same franchise. In 3 years time, he switched and signed as mentor for Kolkata Knight Riders in IPL 2025, while he was associated with the Trinbago Knight Riders in CPL 2024, the last tournament he played before announcing the retirement.

Bravo is one of the leading wicket takers in the Indian Premier League, with 183 wickets. He holds the joint-record for most wickets in a single edition of the league, taking 32 wickets in 2013. The record was later equaled by Harshal Patel in 2021. He became the first player to win Purple Cap twice, for taking the most wickets in 2013 and 2015.

=== Pakistan Super League ===
In 2016 PSL draft, Bravo was picked by Lahore Qalandars in 2016 draft for US$70,000. His team finished last and were disqualified. He also captained the team in the absence of regular captain Azhar Ali. He was retained by Qalandars for 2017 Season but he didn't play in the second season.

Dwayne Bravo signed with Peshawar Zalmi in 2018 draft.

In 2019 draft he signed with Quetta Gladiators. His team won the tournament for the first time, defeating Peshawar Zalmi in the final.

=== Other T20 franchises ===
In May 2018, he was named as one of the ten marquee players for the first edition of the Global T20 Canada cricket tournament. On 3 June 2018, he was selected to play for the Winnipeg Hawks in the players' draft for the inaugural edition of the tournament.

In October 2018, he was named in Paarl Rocks' squad for the first edition of the Mzansi Super League T20 tournament. He was the joint-leading wicket-taker for the team in the tournament, with ten dismissals in six matches. In June 2019, he was selected to play for the Winnipeg Hawks franchise team in the 2019 Global T20 Canada tournament.

In July 2020, he was named in the Trinbago Knight Riders squad for the 2020 Caribbean Premier League. On 26 August 2020, in the match against the St Lucia Zouks, Bravo became the first bowler to take 500 wickets in T20 cricket, and the first bowler to take 100 wickets in the CPL. In April 2022, he was bought by the Northern Superchargers for the 2022 season of The Hundred in England.

In June 2023, Bravo was selected to play for the Texas Super Kings for the inaugural season of Major League Cricket. He only appeared in four matches due to an injury, but still managed the second highest average of 68 for the season, scoring 136 runs.

== Other work ==
In 2016, Bravo released his first single Champion to commemorate West Indies winning the 2016 World T20. The single became a runaway hit in India, topping charts. The release led to rumours of Bravo acting in Bollywood. He responded by saying, "Jashoda Madhavji from my team is working on it and given her expertise, a film may just happen. I have been getting offers, but I need to find something that brings out the actor in me and fans can relate to Bravo, the actor, just as they have related to Bravo, the singer."
