= 2016–17 Regional Super50 =

Cricket tournament

- Dates: 24 January – 18 February 2017
- Administrator: WICB
- Cricket format: List A (50 overs)
- Tournament format(s): Round-robin Group stage, finals
- Host: Antigua and Barbuda
- Champions: Barbados (8th title)
- Participants: 10
- Matches: 43
- Most runs: Kieran Powell (513)
- Most wickets: Ashley Nurse (26)

The 2016–17 Regional Super50 was the 43rd edition of the Regional Super50, the domestic limited-overs cricket competition for the countries of the West Indies Cricket Board (WICB). The tournament was held in Antigua and Barbuda.

Ten teams participated in the competition – the six regular teams of West Indian domestic cricket (Barbados, Guyana, Jamaica, the Leeward Islands, Trinidad and Tobago, and the Windward Islands), two development teams (Combined Campuses and Colleges and ICC Americas), the West Indies under-19 cricket team and the English team Kent County Cricket Club.

Kent accepted an invitation from the WICB to play in the tournament, the first time that any English county team had competed in an overseas domestic tournament. The invitation was partly due to the influence of former West Indian captain Jimmy Adams who, until September 2016, had been Head Coach of the county.

Following the conclusion of the group stage, Trinidad & Tobago and the Leeward Islands progressed to the semi-finals from Group A, while Barbados and Jamaica progressed from Group B. In the first semi-final, Jamaica beat Trinidad & Tobago by 292 runs, after they made 434 for 4, the highest total in the history of the Regional Super50. In the second semi-final, Barbados beat the Leeward Islands by 110 runs, to make their second successive appearance in the final of the Regional Super50. Barbados won the final, beating Jamaica by 59 runs.

== Squads ==
Barbados	(Cricket West Indies) Combined Campuses	Guyana	(Combined Islands) ICC Americas	Jamaica
Jason Holder (c); Anthony Alleyne; Sulieman Benn; Carlos Brathwaite; Kraigg Brathwaite; Shamarh Brooks; Jonathan Carter; Roston Chase; Miguel Cummins; Shane Dowrich; Shai Hope; Ashley Nurse; Kemar Roach; Kevin Stoute; Jomel Warrican	Jamal Smith (c); Aaron Jones; Cassius Burton; Raymond Bynoe; Kyle Corbin; Mark Deyal; Larry Edwards; Keon Harding; Ryan Hinds; Amir Jangoo (wk); Jermaine Levy; Nino Henry; Christopher Powell; Vikash Mohan	Leon Johnson (c); Christopher Barnwell; Ronsford Beaton; Devendra Bishoo; Anthony Bramble; Shivnarine Chanderpaul; Rajendra Chandrika; Jonathan Foo; Assad Fudadin; Shimron Hetmyer; Steven Jacobs; Veerasammy Permaul; Raymon Reifer; Paul Wintz	Nitish Kumar (c); Hamza Tariq (wk); Timroy Allen; Alex Amsterdam; Fahad Babar; Akeem Dodson; Nikhil Dutta; Ali Khan; Kamau Leverock; Timil Patel; Cecil Pervez; Jessy Singh; Nicholas Standford; ~~Steven Taylor~~; Srimantha Wijeratne; Saad Bin Zafar	Nikita Miller (c); Jermaine Blackwood; Gavon Brown; John Campbell; Damion Jacobs; Brandon King; Reynard Leveridge; Andre McCarthy; Paul Palmer; Rovman Powell; Damani Sewell; Jerome Taylor; Steven Taylor; Devon Thomas; Chadwick Walton
Kent	Leeward Islands	Trinidad and Tobago	West Indies U19	Windward Islands
Sam Northeast (c); Adam Ball; Daniel Bell-Drummond; Hugh Bernard; Alex Blake; Matt Coles; Sean Dickson; Will Gidman; Calum Haggett; Matt Hunn; Imran Qayyum; Adam Riley; Ollie Robinson (wk); Adam Rouse (wk); Darren Stevens; Ivan Thomas; James Tredwell	Kieran Powell (c); Rahkeem Cornwall (vc); Nkruma Bonner; Jason Campbell; Kevon Cooper; Jahmar Hamilton; Montcin Hodge; Akeal Hosein; Chesney Hughes; Alzarri Joseph; Jermaine Otto; Orlando Peters; Marlon Samuels; Gavin Tonge	Denesh Ramdin (c); Nicholas Alexis; Sheldon Cottrell; Rayad Emrit; Shannon Gabriel; Kyle Hope; Jon-Russ Jaggesar; Imran Khan; Evin Lewis; Jason Mohammed; Kjorn Ottley; Khary Pierre; Roshon Primus; Ravi Rampaul	Emmanuel Stewart (c); Te-Shawn Alleyne; Alick Athanaze; Joshua Bishop (wk); Shian Brathwaite; Kirstan Kallicharan; Mikyle Louis; Obed McCoy; Matthew Patrick; Keemo Paul; Jeavor Royal; Javier Spencer; Shamar Springer; Bhaskar Yadram	Liam Sebastien (c); Audley Alexander; Sunil Ambris (wk); Johnson Charles; Andre Fletcher; Kavem Hodge; Delorn Johnson; Mervin Matthew; Kyle Mayers; Kadeem Phillip; Daren Sammy; Shane Shillingford; Devon Smith; Tyrone Theophile; Kesrick Williams

In December 2016, Steven Taylor was named in the ICC Americas' squad. However, in January 2017 he moved to Jamaica's team for the tournament. Akeem Dodson was later named as Taylor's replacement. Fahad Babar left the ICC Americas squad midway through the competition because of immigration worries, following the executive order issued by Donald Trump.

== Points tables ==
In the group stage of the tournament four points were awarded for each match a team won, with two points awarded to both teams if a match ends in a tie or if there is no result declared. A bonus point was awarded to a team if they won a match with a run rate of 1.25 that of the opposition team.

=== Group A ===
Pos	Team	Pld	W	L	T	NR	BP	Pts	NRR
1	Trinidad and Tobago	8	7	1	0	0	3	31	1.263
2	Leeward Islands	8	6	2	0	0	4	28	1.323
3	Kent	8	3	5	0	0	1	13	−0.307
4	Windward Islands	8	3	5	0	0	0	12	−0.445
5	West Indies U19	8	1	7	0	0	0	4	−1.681

Source: CricInfo

=== Group B ===
Pos	Team	Pld	W	L	T	NR	BP	Pts	NRR
1	Barbados	8	7	1	0	0	5	33	1.762
2	Jamaica	8	6	2	0	0	4	28	0.712
3	Guyana	8	4	4	0	0	2	18	0.030
4	Combined Campuses and Colleges	8	2	6	0	0	1	9	−1.244
5	ICC Americas	8	1	7	0	0	1	5	−1.380

Source: CricInfo

The top two teams from each group qualified for the playoff stage of the tournament.

== Fixtures ==
=== Group A ===
25 January 2017
Scorecard

Windward Islands; 221 (46.2 overs)	v	West Indies U19; 200/9 (50 overs)
Sunil Ambris 54 (84); Keemo Paul 4/31 (8.2 overs)		Bhaskar Yadram 52 (80); Mervin Matthew 4/38 (10 overs)

Windward Islands won by 21 runs
Sir Vivian Richards Stadium, Antigua
Umpires: Patrick Gustard and Verdayne Smith
Player of the match: Mervin Matthew (Windward Islands)

- West Indies Under-19s won the toss and elected to field.
- Te-Shawn Alleyne, Alick Athanaze, Joshua Bishop, Shian Brathwaite, Kirstan Kallicharan, Obed McCoy, Matthew Patrick, Emmanuel Stewart and Bhaskar Yadram (West Indies Under-19s) all made their List A debuts.

25 January 2017 (D/N)
Scorecard

Kent; 233/9 (50 overs)	v	Leeward Islands; 232/3 (43.3 overs)
Calum Haggett 45 (59); Gavin Tonge 4/39 (10 overs)		Nkruma Bonner 78 (103); Adam Riley 2/41 (8 overs)

Leeward Islands won by 7 wickets
Coolidge Cricket Ground, Antigua
Umpires: Gregory Brathwaite and Christopher Taylor
Player of the match: Nkruma Bonner (Leeward Islands)

- Leeward Islands won the toss and elected to field.
- Hugh Bernard and Imran Qayyum (Kent) both made their List A debuts.
- Kent's total was revised down to 228 after the umpires imposed a five-run penalty.

27 January 2017
Scorecard

Leeward Islands; 245 (50 overs)	v	West Indies U19; 157 (47.1 overs)
Kieran Powell 105 (122); Keemo Paul 4/42 (10 overs)		Shamar Springer 54 (67); Nkruma Bonner 3/30 (10 overs)

Leeward Islands won by 88 runs
Sir Vivian Richards Stadium Antigua
Umpires: Patrick Gustard and Christopher Taylor
Player of the match: Kieran Powell (Leeward Islands)

- West Indies Under-19s won the toss and elected to field.
- Javier Spencer (West Indies Under-19s) made his List A debut.
- Kieran Powell scored his first List A century.

27 January 2017 (D/N)
Scorecard

Windward Islands; 266/7 (50 overs)	v	Trinidad and Tobago; 267/8 (48 overs)
Sunil Ambris 69 (88); Ravi Rampaul 4/43 (10 overs)		Jason Mohammed 80 (105); Kyle Mayers 3/59 (9 overs)

Trinidad and Tobago won by 2 wickets
Coolidge Cricket Ground, Antigua
Umpires: Gregory Brathwaite and Carl Tuckett
Player of the match: Jason Mohammed (Trinidad and Tobago)

- Trinidad and Tobago won the toss and elected to field.
- Roshon Primus (Trinidad and Tobago) made his List A debut.

29 January 2017
Scorecard

Trinidad and Tobago; 191 (48.3 overs)	v	Kent; 192/5 (34.1 overs)
Roshon Primus 60 (72); Ivan Thomas 4/51 (9.3 overs)		Sean Dickson 56 (67); Ravi Rampaul 3/46 (6 overs)

Kent won by 5 wickets
Sir Vivian Richards Stadium, Antigua
Umpires: Gregory Brathwaite and Verdayne Smith
Player of the match: Darren Stevens (Kent)

- Kent won the toss and elected to field.

29 January 2017 (D/N)
Scorecard

Leeward Islands; 333/6 (50 overs)	v	Windward Islands; 149 (28.1 overs)
Kieran Powell 135 (137); Liam Sebastien 3/42 (10 overs)		Kyle Mayers 45 (48); Alzarri Joseph 6/31 (8 overs)

Leeward Islands won by 184 runs
Kensington Oval, Bridgetown
Umpires: Patrick Gustard and Christopher Taylor
Player of the match: Alzarri Joseph (Leeward Islands)

- Windward Islands won the toss and elected to field.
- Jermaine Otto (Leeward Islands) made his List A debut.

31 January 2017
Scorecard

West Indies U19; 58 (31 overs)	v	Trinidad and Tobago; 59/2 (10.2 overs)
Emmanuel Stewart 30 (60); Sheldon Cottrell 3/6 (7 overs)		Nicholas Alexis 19* (20); Javier Spencer 1/22 (4 overs)

Trinidad and Tobago won by 8 wickets
Sir Vivian Richards Stadium, Antigua
Umpires: Patrick Gustard and Christopher Taylor
Player of the match: Sheldon Cottrell (Trinidad and Tobago)

- Trinidad and Tobago won the toss and elected to field.
- Khary Pierre (Trinidad and Tobago) and Mikyle Louis (West Indies Under-19s) both made their List A debuts.

31 January 2017 (D/N)
Scorecard

Windward Islands; 241/9 (50 overs)	v	Kent; 242/6 (46.1 overs)
Sunil Ambris 50 (69); Calum Haggett 4/59 (10 overs)		Sam Northeast 49 (70); Shane Shillingford 2/36 (10 overs)

Kent won by 4 wickets
Coolidge Cricket Ground, Antigua
Umpires: Gregory Brathwaite and Verdayne Smith
Player of the match: Adam Ball (Kent)

- Kent won the toss and elected to field.

2 February 2017
Scorecard

West Indies U19; 155 (46.3 overs)	v	Kent; 127 (34 overs)
Matthew Patrick 45 (79); Ivan Thomas 3/39 (8.3 overs)		Sam Northeast 37 (61); Joshua Bishop 4/44 (10 overs)

West Indies Under-19s won by 28 runs
Sir Vivian Richards Stadium, Antigua
Umpires: Christopher Taylor and Carl Tuckett
Player of the match: Bhaskar Yadram (West Indies Under-19s)

- Kent won the toss and elected to bat.

2 February 2017 (D/N)
Scorecard

Trinidad and Tobago; 226/9 (50 overs)	v	Leeward Islands; 215 (48.4 overs)
Nicholas Alexis 50 (83); Jason Campbell 5/37 (10 overs)		Montcin Hodge 82 (126); Khary Pierre 4/40 (9 overs)

Trinidad and Tobago won by 11 runs
Coolidge Cricket Ground, Antigua
Umpires: Patrick Gustard and Verdayne Smith
Player of the match: Khary Pierre (Trinidad and Tobago)

- Leeward Islands won the toss and elected to field.

4 February 2017
Scorecard

West Indies U19; 207/9 (50 overs)	v	Windward Islands; 210/5 (40.2 overs)
Matthew Patrick 45 (91); Kyle Mayers 4/38 (10 overs)		Sunil Ambris 67* (78); Mikyle Louis 2/45 (9.2 overs)

Windward Islands won by 5 wickets
Sir Vivian Richards Stadium, Antigua
Umpires: Verdayne Smith and Chris Wright
Player of the match: Shane Shillingford (Windward Islands)

- Windward Islands won the toss and elected to field.

4 February 2017 (D/N)
Scorecard

Leeward Islands; 275/9 (50 overs)	v	Kent; 170 (39.3 overs)
Kieran Powell 106 (111); Matt Coles 4/52 (10 overs)		Alex Blake 44 (76); Alzarri Joseph 3/62 (9.3 overs)

Leeward Islands won by 105 runs
Coolidge Cricket Ground, Antigua
Umpires: Gregory Brathwaite and Carl Tuckett
Player of the match: Kieran Powell (Leeward Islands)

- Leeward Islands won the toss and elected to bat.

6 February 2017
Scorecard

West Indies U19; 78 (45.3 overs)	v	Leeward Islands; 82/2 (16.5 overs)
Kirstan Kallicharan 33 (95); Akeal Hosein 4/8 (10 overs)		Jahmar Hamilton 42* (44); Javier Spencer 1/13 (4 overs)

Leeward Islands won by 8 wickets
Sir Vivian Richards Stadium, Antigua
Umpires: Gregory Brathwaite and Carl Tuckett
Player of the match: Akeal Hosein (Leeward Islands)

- Leeward Islands won the toss and elected to field.
- West Indies U19 were eliminated as a result of this match.

6 February 2017 (D/N)
Scorecard

Trinidad and Tobago; 214 (47.5 overs)	v	Windward Islands; 182 (46.2 overs)
Evin Lewis 75 (69); Shane Shillingford 3/24 (9.5 overs)		Sunil Ambris 75* (82); Shannon Gabriel 5/33 (8.2 overs)

Trinidad and Tobago won by 32 runs
Coolidge Cricket Ground, Antigua
Umpires: Patrick Gustard and Christopher Taylor
Player of the match: Shannon Gabriel (Trinidad and Tobago)

- Windward Islands won the toss and elected to field.

8 February 2017
Scorecard

Kent; 194 (46 overs)	v	Trinidad and Tobago; 198/5 (41.2 overs)
Will Gidman 50 (77); Ravi Rampaul 4/37 (10 overs)		Jason Mohammed 78* (88); Darren Stevens 3/34 (10 overs)

Trinidad and Tobago won by 5 wickets
Sir Vivian Richards Stadium, Antigua
Umpires: Gregory Brathwaite and Verdayne Smith
Player of the match: Ravi Rampaul Trinidad and Tobago

- Trinidad and Tobago won the toss and elected to field.
- Trinidad and Tobago qualified for the semi-finals as a result of this match.

8 February 2017 (D/N)
Scorecard

Windward Islands; 293/8 (50 overs)	v	Leeward Islands; 297/6 (48.4 overs)
Devon Smith 101 (103); Akeal Hosein 4/57 (10 overs)		Kieran Powell 80 (84); Liam Sebastien 2/44 (10 overs)

Leeward Islands won by 4 wickets
Coolidge Cricket Ground, Antigua
Umpires: Patrick Gustard and Chris Wright

- Windward Islands won the toss and elected to bat.
- Audley Alexander (Windward Islands) made his List A debut.
- Leeward Islands qualified for the semi-finals as a result of this match.

10 February 2017
Scorecard

Trinidad and Tobago; 290/5 (50 overs)	v	West Indies U19; 108 (29.2 overs)
Jason Mohammed 84 (73); Joshua Bishop 2/41 (10 overs)		Emmanuel Stewart 20 (43); Khary Pierre 3/6 (7 overs)

Trinidad and Tobago won by 182 runs
Sir Vivian Richards Stadium, Antigua
Umpires: Patrick Gustard and Verdayne Smith
Player of the match: Jason Mohammed (Trinidad and Tobago)

- West Indies Under-19s won the toss and elected to field.
- Jeavor Royal (West Indies Under-19s) made his List A debut.

10 February 2017 (D/N)
Scorecard

Kent; 205 (48.5 overs)	v	Windward Islands; 207/4 (47.5 overs)
Will Gidman 94 (106); Delorn Johnson 2/14 (5 overs)		Kavem Hodge 68 (101); Ivan Thomas 2/54 (10 overs)

Windward Islands won by 6 wickets
Coolidge Cricket Ground, Antigua
Umpires: Gregory Brathwaite and Christopher Taylor
Player of the match: Will Gidman (Kent)

- Kent won the toss and elected to bat.
- Kadeem Phillip (Windward Islands) made his List A debut.

12 February 2017
Scorecard

West Indies U19; 191/8 (50 overs)	v	Kent; 192/4 (44.5 overs)
Keemo Paul 72 (57); Matt Coles 3/42 (10 overs)		Adam Rouse 61* (105); Obed McCoy 2/47 (7.5 overs)

Kent won by 6 wickets
Sir Vivian Richards Stadium, Antigua
Umpires: Patrick Gustard and Carl Tuckett
Player of the match: Keemo Paul (West Indies Under-19s)

- West Indies Under-19s won the toss and elected to bat.
- Ollie Robinson (Kent) made his List A debut.

12 February 2017 (D/N)
Scorecard

Leeward Islands; 189 (48.1 overs)	v	Trinidad and Tobago; 190/5 (34.1 overs)
Jermaine Otto 38 (64); Ravi Rampaul 3/27 (10 overs)		Evin Lewis 47 (23); Rahkeem Cornwall 3/40 (10 overs)

Trinidad and Tobago won by 5 wickets
Coolidge Cricket Ground, Antigua
Umpires: Gregory Brathwaite and Verdayne Smith
Player of the match: Ravi Rampaul (Trinidad and Tobago)

- Leeward Islands won the toss and elected to bat.

=== Group B ===
24 January 2017
Scorecard

Combined Campuses and Colleges; 215/8 (50 overs)	v	Jamaica; 140 (35 overs)
Amir Jangoo 64 (114); Damion Jacobs 2/22 (10 overs)		Brandon King 48 (59); Mark Deyal 3/22 (9 overs)

Combined Campuses and Colleges won by 75 runs
Three Ws Oval, Bridgetown
Umpires: Nigel Duguid and Leslie Reifer
Player of the match: Amir Jangoo (Combined Campuses and Colleges)

- Combined Campuses and Colleges won the toss and elected to bat.
- Larry Edwards, Keon Harding, Jermaine Levy (Combined Campuses and Colleges); Reynard Leveridge and Damani Sewell (Jamaica) all made their List A debuts.

24 January 2017 (D/N)
Scorecard

Barbados; 302/7 (50 overs)	v	Guyana; 157 (32 overs)
Kraigg Brathwaite 101 (146); Veerasammy Permaul 2/56 (10 overs)		Leon Johnson 55 (68); Sulieman Benn 4/35 (6 overs)

Barbados won by 145 runs
Kensington Oval, Bridgetown
Umpires: Jonathan Blades and Peter Nero
Player of the match: Kraigg Brathwaite (Barbados)

- Barbados won the toss and elected to bat.
- Kraigg Brathwaite scored his first List A century.

26 January 2017
Scorecard

ICC Americas; 181/9 (50 overs)	v	Combined Campuses and Colleges; 184/3 (45.4 overs)
Timroy Allen 43 (50); Keon Harding 2/27 (10 overs)		Amir Jangoo 52 (87); Nikhil Dutta 1/21 (8 overs)

Combined Campuses and Colleges won by 7 wickets
Windward Park, Lucas Street
Umpires: Deighton Butler and Nigel Duguid
Player of the match: Keon Harding (Combined Campuses and Colleges)

- Combined Campuses and Colleges won the toss and elected to field.
- Jasdeep Singh, Kamau Leverock and Nicholas Standford (ICC Americas) all made their List A debuts.

26 January 2017 (D/N)
Scorecard

Jamaica; 249/8 (50 overs)	v	Guyana; 208 (44 overs)
Chadwick Walton 82 (84); Steven Jacobs 2/27 (10 overs)		Shivnarine Chanderpaul 101 (96); Jerome Taylor 5/40 (9 overs)

Jamaica won by 41 runs
Kensington Oval, Bridgetown
Umpires: Jonathan Blades and Leslie Reifer
Player of the match: Jerome Taylor (Jamaica)

- Jamaica won the toss and elected to bat.

28 January 2017
Scorecard

ICC Americas; 103 (34.2 overs)	v	Barbados; 105/2 (29 overs)
Kamau Leverock 21 (24); Ashley Nurse 4/26 (10 overs)		Kraigg Brathwaite 43* (86); Saad Bin Zafar 1/33 (10 overs)

Barbados won by 8 wickets
Three Ws Oval, Bridgetown
Umpires: Deighton Butler and Peter Nero
Player of the match: Ashley Nurse (Barbados)

- ICC Americas won the toss and elected to bat.

28 January 2017 (D/N)
Scorecard

Combined Campuses and Colleges; 129 (44.5 overs)	v	Guyana; 130/2 (26.3 overs)
Kyle Corbin 28 (41); Veerasammy Permaul 3/19 (10 overs)		Raymon Reifer 67 (67); Jermaine Levy 1/28 (6.3 overs)

Guyana won by 8 wickets
Kensington Oval, Bridgetown
Umpires: Jonathan Blades and Danesh Ramdhanie
Player of the match: Raymon Reifer (Guyana)

- Combined Campuses and Colleges won the toss and elected to bat.

30 January 2017
Scorecard

ICC Americas; 220/7 (45 overs)	v	Guyana; 212/4 (43.3 overs)
Nitish Kumar 66 (73); Ronsford Beaton 4/28 (9 overs)		Leon Johnson 78 (84); Timroy Allen 1/22 (8 overs)

Guyana won by 5 runs (D/L method)
Windward Park, Lucas Street
Umpires: Jonathan Blades and Peter Nero
Player of the match: Ronsford Beaton (Guyana)

- Guyana won the toss and elected to field.
- Fahad Babar (ICC Americas) made his List A debut.

30 January 2017 (D/N)
Scorecard

Jamaica; 190 (45.3 overs)	v	Barbados; 191/9 (48 overs)
Rovman Powell 74 (79); Jason Holder 3/28 (8.3 overs)		Shane Dowrich 40 (65); Jerome Taylor 3/39 (10 overs)

Barbados won by 1 wicket
Kensington Oval, Bridgetown
Umpires: Nigel Duguid and Danesh Ramdhanie
Player of the match: Kemar Roach (Barbados)

- Jamaica won the toss and elected to bat.

1 February 2017
Scorecard

Jamaica; 251/5 (46 overs)	v	ICC Americas; 187 (44.3 overs)
John Campbell 66 (42); Saad Bin Zafar 2/35 (9 overs)		Kamau Leverock 75 (83); Damion Jacobs 5/24 (10 overs)

Jamaica won by 66 runs (D/L method)
Three Ws Oval, Bridgetown
Umpires: Peter Nero and Danesh Ramdhanie
Player of the match: Damion Jacobs (Jamaica)

- ICC Americas won the toss and elected to field.
- Gavon Brown (Jamaica) made his List A debut.

1 February 2017 (D/N)
Scorecard

Barbados; 294 (50 overs)	v	Combined Campuses and Colleges; 94 (36.2 overs)
Roston Chase 76 (55); Jermaine Levy 3/64 (10 overs)		Vikash Mohan 29 (40); Sulieman Benn 3/25 (9 overs)

Barbados won by 200 runs
Kensington Oval, Bridgetown
Umpires: Deighton Butler and Nigel Duguid
Player of the match: Roston Chase (Barbados)

- Barbados won the toss and elected to bat.

3 February 2017
Scorecard

Barbados; 282/9 (50 overs)	v	ICC Americas; 111 (33.4 overs)
Kraigg Brathwaite 108 (134); Timil Patel 3/57 (10 overs)		Timroy Allen 36 (25); Jason Holder 3/25 (10 overs)

Barbados won by 171 runs
Windward Park, Lucas Street
Umpires: Jonathan Blades and Nigel Duguid
Player of the match: Kraigg Brathwaite (Barbados)

- Barbados won the toss and elected to bat.

3 February 2017 (D/N)
Scorecard

Combined Campuses and Colleges; 188 (49.2 overs)	v	Guyana; 189/4 (45.5 overs)
Amir Jangoo 30 (68); Ronsford Beaton 3/52 (9.2 overs)		Leon Johnson 71 (116); Keon Harding 1/22 (8 overs)

Guyana won by 6 wickets
Kensington Oval, Bridgetown
Umpires: Deighton Butler and Peter Nero
Player of the match: Leon Johnson (Guyana)

- Combined Campuses and Colleges won the toss and elected to bat.
- Raymond Bynoe (Combined Campuses and Colleges) made his List A debut.

5 February 2017
Scorecard

Guyana; 186 (50 overs)	v	Barbados; 188/8 (49.3 overs)
Veerasammy Permaul 32 (41); Ashley Nurse 3/28 (10 overs)		Shai Hope 63 (129); Raymon Reifer 4/46 (8.3 overs)

Barbados won by 2 wickets
Three Ws Oval, Bridgetown
Umpires: Deighton Butler and Danesh Ramdhanie
Player of the match: Shai Hope (Barbados)

- Barbados won the toss and elected to field.
- Barbados qualified for the semi-finals as a result of this match.

5 February 2017 (D/N)
Scorecard

Jamaica; 204 (45.2 overs)	v	Combined Campuses and Colleges; 160 (41.3 overs)
Andre McCarthy 51 (54); Vikash Mohan 3/42 (10 overs)		Cassius Burton 28 (39); Nikita Miller 3/12 (9 overs)

Jamaica won by 44 runs
Kensington Oval, Bridgetown
Umpires: Jonathan Blades and Peter Nero
Player of the match: Nikita Miller (Jamaica)

- Jamaica won the toss and elected to bat.

7 February 2017
Scorecard

ICC Americas; 265 (50 overs)	v	Combined Campuses and Colleges; 187 (43.3 overs)
Nitish Kumar 80 (100); Jermaine Levy 4/22 (5 overs)		Mark Deyal 68 (89); Nikhil Dutta 3/32 (10 overs)

ICC Americas won by 72 runs (D/L method)
Windward Park, Lucas Street
Umpires: Nigel Duguid and Danesh Ramdhanie
Player of the match: Nitish Kumar (ICC Americas)

- ICC Americas won the toss and elected to bat.

7 February 2017 (D/N)
Scorecard

Jamaica; 255 (49.4 overs)	v	Guyana; 235 (49.4 overs)
Steven Taylor 86 (82); Raymon Reifer 4/38 (8.4 overs)		Raymon Reifer 54 (89); John Campbell 4/43 (10 overs)

Jamaica won by 20 runs
Kensington Oval, Bridgetown
Umpires: Deighton Butler and Peter Nero
Player of the match: John Campbell (Jamaica)

- Jamaica won the toss and elected to bat.
- Both ICC Americas and Combined Campuses and Colleges were eliminated as a result of this match.

9 February 2017
Scorecard

ICC Americas; 170 (48.1 overs)	v	Guyana; 171/2 (28.1 overs)
Nikhil Dutta 38 (77); Raymon Reifer 3/15 (5.1 overs)		Shimron Hetmyer 94 (76); Saad Bin Zafar 1/29 (4.1 overs)

Guyana won by 8 wickets
Three Ws Oval, Bridgetown
Umpires: Jonathan Blades and Peter Nero
Player of the match: Shimron Hetmyer (Guyana)

- ICC Americas won the toss and elected to bat.

9 February 2017 (D/N)
Scorecard

Jamaica; 255/8 (50 overs)	v	Barbados; 181 (40.2 overs)
Devon Thomas 65 (73); Ashley Nurse 3/38 (10 overs)		Shai Hope 56 (70); John Campbell 4/43 (10 overs)

Jamaica won by 74 runs
Kensington Oval, Bridgetown
Umpires: Deighton Butler and Nigel Duguid
Player of the match: John Campbell (Jamaica)

- Jamaica won the toss and elected to bat.
- Jamaica qualified for the semi-finals as a result of this match.

11 February 2017
Scorecard

ICC Americas; 133 (31 overs)	v	Jamaica; 134/5 (23.4 overs)
Hamza Tariq 32 (51); Damion Jacobs 6/34 (10 overs)		Andre McCarthy 47 (47); Saad Bin Zafar 2/29 (7 overs)

Jamaica won by 5 wickets
Windward Park, Lucas Street
Umpires: Jonathan Blades and Deighton Butler
Player of the match: Damion Jacobs (Jamaica)

- Jamaica won the toss and elected to field.

11 February 2017 (D/N)
Scorecard

Barbados; 294/8 (50 overs)	v	Combined Campuses and Colleges; 151 (44.5 overs)
Jonathan Carter 79 (57); Nino Henry 3/32 (3 overs)		Jamal Smith 42 (63); Sulieman Benn 3/29 (10 overs)

Barbados won by 143 runs
Kensington Oval, Bridgetown
Umpires: Nigel Duguid and Danesh Ramdhanie

- Barbados won the toss and elected to bat.

== Finals ==
Semi-Final
15 February 2017 (D/N)
Scorecard

Jamaica; 434/4 (50 overs)	v	Trinidad and Tobago; 142 (26.3 overs)
Chadwick Walton 117 (157); Ravi Rampaul 2/83 (10 overs)		Jason Mohammed 62* (63); Rovman Powell 5/36 (8 overs)

Jamaica won by 292 runs
Coolidge Cricket Ground, Antigua
Umpires: Gregory Brathwaite and Nigel Duguid
Player of the match: Rovman Powell (Jamaica)

- Trinidad and Tobago won the toss and elected to field.
- Chadwick Walton (Jamaica) scored his first List A century.

Semi-Final
16 February 2017 (D/N)
Scorecard

Barbados; 314/7 (50 overs)	v	Leeward Islands; 204 (47.3 overs)
Shai Hope 125 (108); Rahkeem Cornwall 2/53 (10 overs)		Montcin Hodge 63 (111); Ashley Nurse 3/37 (10 overs)

Barbados won by 110 runs
Coolidge Cricket Ground, Antigua
Umpires: Nigel Duguid and Patrick Gustard
Player of the match: Shai Hope (Barbados)

- Barbados won the toss and elected to bat.

Final
18 February 2017 (D/N)
Scorecard

Barbados; 271/9 (50 overs)	v	Jamaica; 212 (44.3 overs)
Shai Hope 101 (98); Rovman Powell 2/27 (3 overs)		Rovman Powell 65 (59); Sulieman Benn 3/33 (10 overs)

Barbados won by 59 runs
Coolidge Cricket Ground, Antigua
Umpires: Nigel Duguid and Peter Nero
Player of the match: Shai Hope (Barbados)

- Barbados won the toss and elected to bat.
