= 2012–13 Regional Four Day Competition =

Cricket tournament

- Dates: 9 February 2013 – 11 May 2013
- Administrator: West Indies Cricket Board
- Cricket format: First-class cricket (4 days)
- Tournament format: Round-robin
- Champions: Barbados (20th title)
- Participants: 7
- Matches: 24
- Most runs: (Grenada) Devon Smith (700)
- Most wickets: (Jamaica) Nikita Miller (52)

The 2012–13 Regional Four Day Competition was the 47th domestic first-class cricket tournament held in the West Indies. It will take place from 9 February 2013 – 7 May 2013. The seven teams based in the Caribbean competed in a round-robin tournament followed by semi-finals involving the top four teams and a final match between the winners of the semi-finals. There was no touring team competing this edition of the tournament.

== Table ==
Team	Pld	W	L	T	D	Aban	Pts
Jamaica	6	6	0	0	0	0	72
Windward Islands	6	5	1	0	0	0	60
Barbados	6	4	2	0	0	0	48
Trinidad and Tobago	6	3	3	0	0	0	36
Guyana	6	1	4	0	1	0	18
(Cricket West Indies) Combined Campuses and Colleges	6	1	5	0	0	0	18
Leeward Islands	6	0	5	0	1	0	7
Source:Cricinfo

== Group stage ==
9–11 February 2013
Scorecard

Jamaica	v	Barbados
165 (47.2 overs); Jermaine Blackwood 81 (131); Miguel Cummins 5/58 (16.2 overs)		162 (52.1 overs); Jonathan Carter 63 (110); Nikita Miller 5/33 (20.1 overs)
188 (52 overs); Simon Jackson 59 (105); Jonathan Carter 4/3 (3 overs)		128 (58.5 overs); Shane Dowrich 31* (66); Nikita Miller 5/48 (18 overs)

Jamaica won by 63 runs
Kensington Oval, Bridgetown, Barbados
Umpires: Peter Nero (Trinidad) and Leslie Reifer (Barbados)
Player of the match: Nikita Miller (Jamaica)

- Jamaica won the toss and elected to bat.
- Points: Jamaica 12, Barbados 0
- Ashley Nurse (Barbados) made his first-class debut.

9–12 February 2013
Scorecard

Leeward Islands (Cricket West Indies)	v	Guyana
182 (73 overs); Tonito Willett 58 (157); Veerasammy Permaul 4/42 (26 overs)		279 (111.1 overs); Steven Jacobs 75; Lionel Baker 4/57 (25 overs)
322 (116.3 overs); Jahmar Hamilton 106; Veerasammy Permaul 5/73 (38 overs)		173/6 (54.4 overs); Leon Johnson 60; Anthony Martin 3/37 (24 overs)

Match drawn
Sir Vivian Richards Stadium, North Sound, Antigua
Umpires: Danesh Ramdhanie (Trinidad) and Joel Wilson (Trinidad)

- Guyana won the toss and elected to field.
- Points: Guyana 6, Leeward Islands 3
- Tagenarine Chanderpaul (Guyana) and Larry Joseph (Leeward Islands) made their first-class debuts.

9–12 February 2013
Scorecard

Combined Campuses and Colleges (Cricket West Indies)	v	(Cricket West Indies) Windward Islands
309 (98.4 overs); Anthony Alleyne 84 (157); Shane Shillingford 3/76 (34 overs)		409 (112.4 overs); Devon Smith 139 (166); Akeem Dewar 4/127 (33 overs)
284 (85 overs); Chadwick Walton 88 (117); Nelon Pascal 5/81 (16 overs)		187/3 (44.5 overs); Devon Smith 106* (133); Raymon Reifer 1/14 (5 overs)

Windward Islands won by 7 wickets
Beausejour Stadium, Gros Islet, St. Lucia
Umpires: Zahid Bassarath (Trinidad) and Nigel Duguid (Guyana)
Player of the match: Devon Smith (Windward Islands)

- Windward Islands won the toss and elected to field.
- Points: Windward Islands 12, Combined Campuses and Colleges 0
- Anthony Alleyne (Combined Campuses and Colleges) made his first-class debut.

15–18 February 2013
Scorecard

Barbados	v	Guyana
367 (105.2 overs); Kirk Edwards 120 (195); Veerasammy Permaul 3/82 (25 overs)		225 (60 overs); Leon Johnson 46 (71); Miguel Cummins 4/42 (13 overs)
235/7d (71.5 overs); Rashidi Boucher 81 (161); Steven Jacobs 2/49 (17 overs)		284 (80.4 overs); Zaheer Mohamed 58* (112); Miguel Cummins 3/55 (14 overs)

Barbados won by 93 runs
Kensington Oval, Bridgetown, Barbados
Umpires: Nick Cook (England) and Peter Nero (Trinidad)
Player of the match: Kirk Edwards (Barbados)

- Guyana won the toss and elected to field.
- Points: Barbados 12, Guyana 0

15–17 February 2013
Scorecard

Trinidad and Tobago	v	(Cricket West Indies) Windward Islands
179 (66.4 overs); Jason Mohammed 57; Keon Peters 3/28 (14 overs)		260 (78.5 overs); Devon Smith 99; Ravi Rampaul 5/65 (18.5 overs)
86 (38 overs); Adrian Barath 15; Yannic Cariah 15; Dalton Polius 3/10 (4 overs)		6/0 (2 overs); Tyrone Theophile 6 Amit Jaggernauth 0/0 (1 overs)

Windward Islands won by 10 wickets
Arnos Vale Stadium, Kingstown, Saint Vincent
Umpires: Lennox Abraham (Dominica) and Nandkumar Shivsankar (Guyana)
Player of the match: Devon Smith (Windward Islands)

- Windward Islands won the toss and elected to field.
- Points: Windward Islands 12, Trinidad & Tobago 0

27 February–2 March 2013
Scorecard

Combined Campuses and Colleges (Cricket West Indies)	v	Barbados
109 (33.4 overs); Kyle Corbin 26 (41); Chris Jordan 7/43 (16 overs)		372 (143 overs); Kirk Edwards 109 (197); Akeem Dewar 7/116 (43 overs)
78 (39.5 overs); Akeem Dewar 22 (48); Ashley Nurse 3/18 (9.5 overs)

Barbados won by an innings and 185 runs
3Ws Oval, Bridgetown, Barbados
Umpires: Nandkumar Shivsankar (Guyana) and Verdayne Smith (Jamaica)
Player of the match: Chris Jordan

- Combined Campuses and Colleges won the toss and elected to bat.
- Points: Barbados 12, Combined Campuses and Colleges 0

27 February–2 March 2013
Scorecard

Trinidad and Tobago	v	(Cricket West Indies) Leeward Islands
279 (102 overs); Adrian Barath 58 (80); Quinton Boatswain 4/82 (24 overs)		194 (65.3 overs); Sylvester Joseph 68 (118); Imran Khan 4/62 (21.3 overs)
249 (79.5 overs); Yannic Cariah 82 (166); Larry Joseph 4/66 (22 overs)		214 (83.5 overs); Orlando Peters 45 (163); Amit Jaggernauth 4/63 (27.5 overs)

Trinidad and Tobago won by 120 runs
Warner Park, Basseterre, Saint Kitts
Umpires: Norman Malcolm (Jamaica) and Leslie Reifer (Barbados)
Player of the match: Yannic Cariah (Trinidad and Tobago)

- Trinidad and Tobago won the toss and elected to bat.
- Points: Trinidad and Tobago 12, Leeward Islands 0
- Quinton Boatswain (Leeward Islands) and Stephen Katwaroo (Trinidad and Tobago) made their first class debuts.

27 February–2 March 2013
Scorecard

Guyana	v	(Cricket West Indies) Windward Islands
151 (55 overs); Assad Fudadin 55 (123); Shane Shillingford 4/40 (21 overs)		276 (103.2 overs); Keddy Lesporis 39 (57); Devendra Bishoo 5/67 (39.2 overs)
211 (78.4 overs); Zaheer Mohamed 61 (85); Shane Shillingford 7/63 (29.4 overs)		90/6 (21.5 overs); Andre Fletcher 30* (44); Devendra Bishoo 3/19 (8 overs)

Windward Islands won by 4 wickets
Arnos Vale Stadium, Kingstown, Saint Vincent
Umpires: Lennox Abraham (Dominica) and Nick Cook (England)
Player of the match: Shane Shillingford (Windward Islands)

- Windward Islands won the toss and elected to field.
- Points: Windward Islands 12, Guyana 0
- Paul Wintz (Guyana) made his first class debut.

6–9 March 2013
Scorecard

Combined Campuses and Colleges (Cricket West Indies)	v	(Cricket West Indies) Leeward Islands
180 (73.3 overs); Raymon Reifer 45; Larry Joseph 3/32 (16.3 overs)		243 (86.1 overs); Steve Liburd 53; Kevin McClean 3/39 (13 overs)
367/6d (139 overs); Chadwick Walton 101*; Anthony Martin 3/112 (53 overs)		152 (65.1 overs); Devon Thomas 37; Ryan Austin 6/48 (22 overs)

Combined Campuses and Colleges won by 152 runs
3Ws Oval, Bridgetown, Barbados
Umpires: Nick Cook (England) and Nandkumar Shivsankar (Guyana)
Player of the match: Ryan Austin (Combined Campuses and Colleges)

- Leeward Islands won the toss and elected to bat.
- Points: Combined Campuses and Colleges 12, Leeward Islands 4
- Derone Davis and Kesrick Williams (Combined Campuses and Colleges) and Akeem Saunders (Leeward Islands) made their first class debuts.

6–9 March 2013
Scorecard

Trinidad and Tobago	v	Guyana
319 (106.5 overs); Denesh Ramdin 84; Veerasammy Permaul 4/62 (23.5 overs)		195 (63.1 overs); Leon Johnson 87; Sunil Narine 6/38 (17 over)
251/2d (66 overs); Lendl Simmons 70; Narsingh Deonarine 1/44 (10 overs)		330 (91.4 overs); Shivnarine Chanderpaul 108; Sunil Narine 4/105 (28.4 overs)

Trinidad and Tobago won by 45 runs
Queen's Park Oval, Port of Spain, Trinidad
Umpires: Patrick Gustard (Jamaica) and Norman Malcolm (Jamaica)

- Guyana won the toss and elected to field.
- Points: Trinidad and Tobago 12, Guyana 0

6–8 March 2013
Scorecard

Jamaica	v	(Cricket West Indies) Windward Islands
207 (79 overs); Nikita Miller 55 (111); Shane Shillingford 4/74 (26 overs)		130 (55.3 overs); Devon Smith 49 (68); Odean Brown 5/31 (14.3 overs)
97 (37.5 overs); Odean Brown 27 (31); Darren Sammy 4/20 (10 overs)		83 (36 overs); Tyrone Theophile 20 (63); Nikita Miller 7/30 (18 overs)

Jamaica won by 91 runs
National Cricket Stadium, St. George's, Grenada
Umpires: Danesh Ramdhanie (Trinidad) and Verdayne Smith (Jamaica)

- Jamaica won the toss and elected to bat.
- Points: Jamaica 12, Windward Islands 0
- B Buchanan (Jamaica) made his first class debut.

23–26 March 2013
Scorecard

Barbados	v	(Cricket West Indies) Windward Islands
64 (33.3 overs); Stoute 33 (77); Shillingford 4/20 (12.3 overs)		184 (77.1 overs); Smith 40 (62); Benn 4/50 (24.1 overs)
205 (80.2 overs); Brathwaite 91 (266); Shillingford 8/82 (37 overs)		301/4 (87 overs); Smith 150 (267); Holder 1/44 (12 overs)

Windward Islands won by 216 runs
Kensington Oval, Bridgetown, Barbados
Umpires: Nigel Duguid (Guyana) and Masudur Rahman (Bangladesh)
Player of the match: Smith and Shillingford (Windward Islands)

- Windward Islands won the toss and elected to bat
- Points: Windward Islands 12, Barbados 0
- First-class debut: Shai Hope (Barbados)

23–26 March 2013
Scorecard

Trinidad and Tobago	v	(Cricket West Indies) Combined Campuses and Colleges
406/9 (123 overs); Mohammad 138 (244); Austin 3/94 (31 overs)		188 (62.5 overs); Corbin 62 (110); Emrit 6/35 (16.5 overs)
13/0 (2 overs); Barath 11 (12 overs); 0/6 (1 overs)		228 (64.3 overs); Walton 93 (148); Richards 3/66 (11 overs)

Trinidad & Tobago won by 10 wickets
Queen's Park Oval, Port of Spain, Trinidad
Umpires: Gregory Brathwaite (Barbados) and Patrick Gustard (Jamaica)
Player of the match: Mohammad (Trinidad and Tobago)

- Combined Campuses and Colleges won the toss and elected to field
- Points: Trinidad and Tobago 12, Combined Campuses and Colleges 0
- First-class debut: Marlon Richards (Trinidad and Tobago)

23–25 March 2013
Scorecard

Jamaica	v	(Cricket West Indies) Leeward Islands
209 (58.4 overs); Jermaine Blackwood 42; Justin Athanaze 4/76 (18 overs)		108 (65.2 overs); Montcin Hodge 21; Nikita Miller 7/13 (20.2 overs)
225 (60.2 overs); Odean Brown 59; Hayden Walsh 4/62 (13 overs)		156 (49.5 overs); Jahmar Hamilton 52; Nikita Miller 4/34 (13.5 overs)

Jamaica won by 170 runs
Sabina Park, Kingston, Jamaica
Umpires: Danesh Ramdhanie (Trinidad) and Verdayne Smith (Jamaica)
Player of the match: Nikita Miller (Jamaica)

- Leeward Islands won the toss and elected to field
- Points: Jamaica 12, Leeward Islands 0
- First-class debut: Lyndel Richardson (Leeward Islands)

30 March–2 April 2013
Scorecard

Combined Campuses and Colleges (Cricket West Indies)	v	Guyana
167 (63.1 overs); Anthony Alleyne 37; Veerasammy Permaul 4/39 (20.1 overs)		231 (92.5 overs); Assad Fudadin 87; Nekoli Parris 4/9 (5.5 overs)
193 (77.1 overs); Kevin McClean 40; Veerasammy Permaul 4/22 (17.1 overs)		175 (63.2 overs); Steven Jacobs 45; Akeem Dewar 3/21 (9.2 overs)

Guyana won by 46 runs
3Ws Oval, Bridgetown, Barbados
Umpires: Nigel Duguid (Guyana) and Peter Nero (Trinidad)
Player of the match: Assad Fudadin (Guyana)

- Combined Campuses and Colleges won the toss and elected to field
- Points: Guyana 12, Combined Campuses and Colleges 0
- First-class debut: Anthony Bramble (Guyana)

30 March–2 April 2013
Scorecard

Leeward Islands (Cricket West Indies)	v	Barbados
201 (62.1 overs); Sylvester Joseph 65 (118); Ashley Nurse 6/89 (24.1 overs)		381/6d (146.3 overs); Kraigg Brathwaite 165 (443); Kelbert Walters 3/64 (33 overs)
149 (40.4 overs); Jahmar Hamilton 50 (80); Sulieman Benn 6/43 (18 overs)

Barbados won by an innings and 31 runs
Warner Park, Basseterre, St. Kitts
Umpires: Masudur Rahman (Bangladesh) and Joel Wilson (Trinidad)
Player of the match: Kraigg Brathwaite (Barbados)

- Leeward Islands won the toss and elected to bat
- Points: Barbados 12, Leeward Islands 0

30 March–2 April 2013
Scorecard

Jamaica	v	Trinidad and Tobago
147 (49.4 overs); Danza Hyatt 57; Kavesh Kantasingh 5/35 (17.4 overs)		121 (48.2 overs); Lendl Simmons 39 (51); Sheldon Cottrell 5/43 (13.2 overs)
259 (74.1 overs); Brenton Parchment 75 (205); Imran Khan 5/28 (9.1 overs)		192 (77.2 overs); Rayad Emrit 52 (53); Nikita Miller 4/54 (25.2 overs)

Jamaica won by 93 runs
Sabina Park, Kingston, Jamaica
Umpires: Gregory Brathwaite (Barbados) and Patrick Gustard (Jamaica)
Player of the match: Brenton Parchment (Jamaica)

- Trinidad & Tobago won the toss and elected to field
- Points: Jamaica 12, Trinidad and Tobago 0

10–13 April 2013

Leeward Islands (Cricket West Indies)	v	(Cricket West Indies) Windward Islands
129 (53.5 overs); Kieran Powell 51; Shane Shillingford 7/45 (17.5 overs)		268 (66.2 overs); Liam Sebastien 93; Yannick Leonard 4/63 (18.0 overs)
158 (59.1 overs); Kieran Powell 51; Liam Sebastien 5/30 (14.1 overs)		23/1; Devon Smith 19*; Yannick Leonard 1/6 (2.2 overs)

Windward Islands won by 9 wickets
Sir Vivian Richards Stadium, North Sound, Antigua

- Windward Islands won the toss and chose to bowl
- Points: Windward Islands 12, Leeward Islands 0

10–13 April 2013

Trinidad and Tobago	v	Barbados

Queen's Park Oval, Port of Spain, Trinidad

10–13 April 2013

Jamaica	v	Guyana

Sabina Park, Kingston, Jamaica

25–28 April 2013

Jamaica	v	(Cricket West Indies) Combined Campuses and Colleges

Sabina Park, Kingston, Jamaica

== Semi finals ==
2–3 May 2013
Scorecard

Barbados	v	(Cricket West Indies) Windward Islands
212 (75.2); Jonathan Carter 116; Shane Shillingford 6/81 (31.0 Overs		44 (25.1); Devon Smith 14; Ashley Nurse 7/10 (10.1 Overs)
		67 (27.1); Andre Fletcher 27; Ashley Nurse 7-30 (14.0)

Barbados won by an innings and 101 runs
National Cricket Stadium, St. George's, Grenada
Player of the match: Ashley Nurse

- Barbados won the toss and elected to bat

27–30 April 2013

Jamaica	v	TBA

== Final ==
4–7 May 2013
Scorecard

Trinidad and Tobago	v	Barbados
110 (37.4 overs); Rayad Emrit 34; Miguel Cummins 5-30 (12.4 overs)		369 (110 overs); Kraigg Brathwaite 122; Marlon Richards 4-55 (21.0 overs)
237 (55.4 overs); Lendl Simmons 140; Miguel Cummins 4-75 (14.0 overs)

Barbados won by an innings and 22 runs
Kensington Oval, Bridgetown, Barbados
Umpires: Nigel Duguid and Patrick Gustard
Player of the match: Miguel Cummins

- Barbados won the toss and elected to field
- Barbados won 2012/13 Regional Four Day Competition

== Points allocation ==
Completed match

- Outright win – 12
- Loser if 1st Innings lead obtained – 4
- Loser if tie on 1st Innings – 3
- Loser if 1st Innings also lost – 0
- Tie – 8

Incomplete Match

- 1st Innings lead – 6
- 1st Innings loss – 3
- Tie on 1st innings – 4

Score Equal in a Drawn Match

- Team batting on the 4th innings – 8
- Team fielding on the 4th innings if that team has lead on 1st inning – 6
- If scores tied on 1st innings – 4
- If team has lost on 1st innings – 3

Abandoned Match

In the event of a match being abandoned without any play having taken place, or in the event of there being no 1st innings decision, three points each.

== Top performers ==
- Most Runs:
  - Devon Smith (Windward Islands) – 700 runs.
- Most Wickets:
  - Nikita Miller (Jamaica) – 52 wickets.

== Notable highlights ==
- Nikita Miller achieved remarkable bowling figures throughout the tournament, including multiple five-wicket hauls, significantly contributing to Jamaica's success in the group stages.
- Devon Smith consistently provided strong performances with the bat, leading the run-scoring charts and playing pivotal roles in Windward Islands' victories.
- The final match saw Ashley Nurse deliver a standout performance for Barbados, taking crucial wickets that led to their championship win.
