= 2021 Minor League Cricket final =

Cricket match

- Event: 2021 Minor League Cricket season
New Jersey Stallions	Silicon Valley Strikers
141	142/4
20 overs	18.1 overs
- Silicon Valley Strikers won by 6 wickets
- Date: 3 October 2021
- Venue: Church Street Park, Morrisville
- Player of the match: Narsingh Deonarine (Silicon Valley Strikers)
- Umpires: Jermaine Lindo; Vijaya Mallela
- Attendance: 3,250

The 2021 Minor League Cricket final was a Twenty20 cricket match played on 3 October 2021, at Church Street Park, Morrisville between the New Jersey Stallions and the Silicon Valley Strikers to determine the winner of the 2021 Minor League Cricket season of Minor League Cricket.

== Road to the final ==
During the group stage of the 2021 Minor League Cricket season (MiLC) each team played 14-16 matches, two against each of the other side of its group and its neighboring group (i.e. Southern and Eastern, Central and Western). All matches took place in one of 27 venues chosen to be played in that season. The format for the group stage was a round-robin. That meant all teams would face each other at least twice. The teams needed to qualify in the top 2 of their respective groups to qualify for the play-offs. The Stallions finished 1st in their group, and the Strikers finished 2nd. Both teams won at least 10 games during the group stage, but the Stallions lost 4 with one being washed out, and the Strikers lost 3, with one washed out.

== Match ==
The final match was played between the New Jersey Stallions and the Silicon Valley Strikers at Church Street Park, Morrisville, North Carolina.

=== Summary ===
The New Jersey Stallions won the toss and elected to bat. In the first innings, the Stallions mustered up an opening 29-run partnership before Ramrattan was edged behind to Jariwala off a good ball from Roshon Primus. But, a 42 and 31 from Dominique Rikhi and Saiteja Mukkamalla helped it muster up a 60-run partnership to help the Stallions to 89/2, before a collapse would settle. Kulvinder Singh and Saurabh Netravalkar ripped apart the middle order, with late cameos from Stephen Wiig and Karan Patel as the Stallions folded for 141.

The Strikers' openers got off to a good start, with the first wicket falling at 28. Jariwala was caught by Wiig off Sachin Mylavarapu after bowling a wide outside-off bouncer. Strikers captain Unmukt Chand was the next to fall after smashing Rovman Powell for two sixes and one four. Shehan Jayasuriya fell soon after being run out by some good fielding from Justin Dill. Pranay Suri, the Strikers' vice-captain fell after attempting a lofted shot, ending a struggling innings of 5 from 11 deliveries. Roshon Primus joined Narsingh Deonarine at the crease and helped a 72*-run partnership to lead the Strikers to victory. Deonarine smashed 52*, with Primus chipping in with a 31*.

== Scorecard ==
Notes:

- † indicates team captain
- * indicates not out

Toss: New Jersey Stallions won the toss and elected to bat.

New Jersey Stallions innings
Player	Status	Runs	Balls	4s	6s	Strike rate
Raymond Ramrattan	c Jariwala b Primus	12	13	2	0	92.31
Dominique Rikhi	c Jariwala b Suri	42	33	4	2	127.27
Saiteja Mukkamalla	b Singh	31	27	3	1	114.81
Rovman Powell	c Jayasuriya b Netravalkar	9	11	0	0	81.82
Hiren Patel	c †Chand b Suri	0	4	0	0	0.00
Jon-Ross Campbell	c Primus b Netravalkar	5	8	0	0	62.50
Justin Dill	b Singh	2	6	0	0	33.33
†Jasdeep Singh	lbw Singh	1	4	0	0	25.00
Stephen Wiig	c Singh b Primus	17	9	3	0	188.89
Karan Patel	*	10	6	0	1	166.67
Sachin Mylavarapu	run out (Primus/Jariwala)	0	1	0	0	0.00
Extras (lb 3, w 7, nb 2); Total 141 (20 overs)				12	4	7.05 RR

Fall of wickets: 28/1 (Raymond Ramrattan, 3.4 ov), 89/2 (Saiteja Mukkamalla, 11.2 ov), 93/3 (Dominique Rikhi, 12.1 ov), 93/4 (Hiren Patel, 12.5 ov), 104/5 (Jon-Ross Campbell, 14.5 ov), 107/6 (Rovman Powell, 16.1 ov), 110/7 (Jasdeep Singh, 17.1 ov), 112/8 (Justin Dill, 17.3 ov), 134/9 (Stephen Wiig, 19.3), 141/10 (Sachin Mylavarapu, 19.6 ov)

Silicon Valley Strikers bowling
Bowler	Overs	Maidens	Runs	Wickets	Econ	Wides	NBs
Saurabh Netravalkar	4	0	17	2	4.25	0	1
Kulvinder Singh	4	0	32	3	8.00	4	0
Roshon Primus	4	0	23	2	5.75	1	0
Abhishek Paradkar	3	0	39	0	13.00	2	1
Pranay Suri	4	0	18	2	4.50	0	0
Shehan Jayasuriya	1	0	9	0	9.00	0	0

Target:' 142 runs from 20 overs at 7.10 RR

Silicon Valley Strikers innings
Player	Status	Runs	Balls	4s	6s	Strike rate
Rahul Jariwala	c Wiig b Mylavarapu	22	17	3	0	129.41
†Unmukt Chand	c&b Rovman Powell	21	12	1	2	175.00
Shehan Jayasuriya	run out (Justin Dill)	0	1	0	0	0.00
Narsingh Deonarine	*	52	43	3	3	120.93
Pranay Suri	c Campbell b Ramrattan	5	11	0	0	45.45
Roshon Primus	*	31	25	3	1	124.00
Kulvinder Singh	did not bat					
Saurabh Netravalkar	did not bat					
Rohith Ramkumar	did not bat					
Gary Graham	did not bat					
Abhishek Paradkar	did not bat					
Extras (lb 6, w 5); Total 142/4 (18.1 overs)				10	6	7.85 RR

Fall of wickets: 28/1 (Rahul Jariwala, 3.6 ov), 45/2 (†Unmukt Chand, 4.5 ov), 53/3 (Shehan Jayasuriya, 5.2 ov), 70/4 (Pranay Suri, 10.1 ov)

New Jersey Stallions bowling
Bowler	Overs	Maidens	Runs	Wickets	Econ	Wides	NBs
Jasdeep Singh	3	0	23	0	7.67	1	0
Justin Dill	3	0	29	0	9.67	0	0
Sachin Mylavarapu	3	0	10	1	3.33	0	0
Rovman Powell	3.1	0	28	1	8.84	1	0
Stephen Wiig	3	0	14	0	4.67	3	0
Raymond Ramrattan	1	0	11	1	11.00	0	0
Karan Patel	2	0	21	0	10.50	0	0

Result: Silicon Valley Strikers won by 6 wickets.
