= 2016–17 Regional Four Day Competition =

Cricket tournament

- Dates: 11 November 2016 – 24 April 2017
- Administrator(s): WICB
- Cricket format: First-class (four-day)
- Tournament format(s): Double round-robin
- Champions: Guyana (9th title)
- Participants: 6
- Matches: 30
- Most runs: (Trinidad and Tobago) Yannic Cariah (691)
- Most wickets: (Jamaica) Nikita Miller (58)

The 2016–17 Regional Four Day Competition was the 51st edition of the Regional Four Day Competition, the domestic first-class cricket competition for the countries of the West Indies Cricket Board (WICB). The competition ran from 11 November 2016 to 24 April 2017. The WCIB re-introduced day/night fixtures into the competition with six matches played as such.

Six teams contested the tournament – Barbados, Guyana, Jamaica, the Leeward Islands, Trinidad and Tobago, and the Windward Islands. Guyana won the competition, their third consecutive title, after beating the Windward Islands in their penultimate match.

== Points table ==
Team	Pld	W	L	D	Pts
Guyana	10	5	2	3	134.8
Barbados	10	4	1	5	124
Jamaica	10	4	5	1	103.6
Trinidad and Tobago	10	4	5	1	102.8
Windward Islands	10	3	5	2	97.6
Leeward Islands	10	1	5	2	89.2

Champions

== Fixtures ==
=== Round 1 ===
11–14 November 2016
Scorecard

Guyana	v	Jamaica
298 (103 overs); Shivnarine Chanderpaul 91 (140); Nikita Miller 4/71 (39 overs)		208 (65.4 overs); John Campbell 71 (101); Veerasammy Permaul 5/60 (22 overs)
238/4d (81.3 overs); Vishaul Singh 71 (149); Jermaine Blackwood 2/12 (3 overs)		147 (85.2 overs); Jermaine Blackwood 96 (223); Gudakesh Motie 4/35 (30 overs)

Guyana won by 181 runs
Providence Stadium, Guyana
Umpires: Jonathan Blades and Nigel Duguid
Player of the match: Veerasammy Permaul (Guyana)

- Guyana won the toss and elected to bat.
- Eon Hooper (Guyana) and Derval Green (Jamaica) both made their first-class debuts.

11–14 November 2016
Scorecard

Leeward Islands	v	Barbados
377 (157.5 overs); Nkrumah Bonner 94 (254); Kenroy Williams 4/26 (8.5 overs)		237 (84 overs); Kenroy Williams 46 (101); Rahkeem Cornwall 5/117 (35 overs)
164/6d (56 overs); Rahkeem Cornwall 60 (51); Jomel Warrican 3/31 (17 overs)		235/5 (80 overs); Anthony Alleyne 84 (199); Rahkeem Cornwall 4/101 (35 overs)

Match drawn
Warner Park, Basseterre
Umpires: Carl Tuckett and Joel Wilson
Player of the match: Rahkeem Cornwall (Leeward Islands)

- Leeward Islands won the toss and elected to bat.

11–14 November 2016 (D/N)
Scorecard

Windward Islands	v	Trinidad and Tobago
142 (37.3 overs); Devon Smith 86; Roshon Primus 6/30 (6 overs)		242 (83.4 overs); Jason Mohammed 70 (95); Shane Shillingford 3/53 (17 overs)
254 (77.2 overs); Shane Shillingford 65 (94); Imran Khan 5/84 (26.2 overs)		157/1 (44.1 overs); Kyle Hope 79* (120); Shane Shillingford 1/32 (14 overs)

Trinidad and Tobago won by 9 wickets
Queen's Park Oval, Port of Spain
Umpires: Zahid Bassarath and Patrick Gustard

- Trinidad and Tobago won the toss and elected to field.
- Roshon Primus (Trinidad and Tobago) made his first-class debut.

=== Round 2 ===
18–21 November 2016
Scorecard

Barbados	v	Trinidad and Tobago
242 (106.5 overs); Anthony Alleyne 88 (201); Sheldon Cottrell 3/27 (15.5 overs)		168 (58.5 overs); Roshon Primus 65 (78); Kenroy Williams 3/21 (7.5 overs)
317/2d (71.4 overs); Anthony Alleyne 186 (215); Marlon Richards 1/41 (8.4 overs)		99 (53 overs); Kyle Hope 26 (44); Kevin Stoute 3/14 (12 overs)

Barbados won by 292 runs
Queen's Park Oval, Port of Spain
Umpires: Deighton Butler and Peter Nero
Player of the match: Anthony Alleyne (Barbados)

- Trinidad and Tobago won the toss and elected to field.
- Jyd Goolie (Trinidad and Tobago) made his first-class debut.

18–21 November 2016
Scorecard

Guyana	v	Leeward Islands
293 (83.2 overs); Shivnarine Chanderpaul 81 (148); Rahkeem Cornwall 6/87 (29.2 overs)		158 (77 overs); Kieran Powell 79 (181); Gudakesh Motie 3/43 (17 overs)
233/8d (75.4 overs); Christopher Barnwell 61 (121); Hayden Walsh 4/56 (10.4 overs)		372/6 (111.3 overs); Montcin Hodge 114 (287); Veerasammy Permaul 4/109 (40 overs)

Leeward Islands won by 4 wickets
Warner Park, Basseterre
Umpires: Gregory Brathwaite and Patrick Gustard
Player of the match: Montcin Hodge (Leeward Islands)

- Leeward Islands won the toss and elected to field.

18–21 November 2016
Scorecard

Jamaica	v	Windward Islands
151 (60.3 overs); Devon Thomas 51 (137); Shane Shillingford 5/32 (15 overs)		205 (64.2 overs); Sunil Ambris 61 (94); Oshane Thomas 2/26 (7 overs)
159 (61.1 overs); John Campbell 67 (141); Larry Edwards 6/20 (15 overs)		64 (27 overs); Devon Smith 19 (36); Nikita Miller 5/22 (9 overs)

Jamaica won by 41 runs
Sabina Park, Kingston
Umpires: Leslie Reifer and Verdayne Smith
Player of the match: Nikita Miller (Jamaica)

- Windward Islands won the toss and elected to field.
- Oshane Thomas (Jamaica) made his first-class debut.

=== Round 3 ===
25–28 November 2016
Scorecard

Trinidad and Tobago	v	Leeward Islands
287/8 (92 overs); Kyle Hope 86 (120); Kieran Powell 3/29 (14 overs)

Match drawn
Queen's Park Oval, Port of Spain
Umpires: Gregory Brathwaite and Danesh Ramdhanie

- Leeward Islands won the toss and elected to field.
- No play was possible on day 1.
- Isaiah Rajah and Khary Pierre (Trinidad and Tobago) both made their first-class debuts.

25–28 November 2016
Scorecard

Jamaica	v	Barbados
224 (86.2 overs); John Campbell 60 (142); Kemar Roach 3/27 (18 overs)		273 (103.5 overs); Anthony Alleyne 66 (123); Fabian Allen 3/34 (12.5 overs)
112/2 (33 overs); John Campbell 49 (66); Jomel Warrican 2/29 (13 overs)

Match drawn
Sabina Park, Kingston
Umpires: Nigel Duguid and Jacqueline Williams
Player of the match: John Campbell (Jamaica)

- Barbados won the toss and elected to field.
- No play was possible on day 1.
- Fabian Allen (Jamaica) made his first-class debut.

25–28 November 2016 (D/N)
Scorecard

Windward Islands	v	Guyana
192 (51.3 overs); Kyle Mayers 51 (65); Raymon Reifer 6/82 (16.3 overs)		219 (70.3 overs); Anthony Bramble 58 (75); Mervin Matthew 4/43 (19.4 overs)
90/4 (38.4 overs); Tyrone Theophile 39 (100); Keon Joseph 3/26 (9 overs)

Match drawn
Daren Sammy Cricket Ground, Gros Islet
Umpires: Deighton Butler and Joel Wilson
Player of the match: Raymon Reifer (Guyana)

- Guyana won the toss and elected to field.

=== Round 4 ===
8–11 December 2016
Scorecard

Jamaica	v	Trinidad and Tobago
314 (78.4 overs); Andre McCarthy 82 (137); Roshon Primus 3/32 (9 overs)		206 (53.5 overs); Jason Mohammed 91* (125); Damion Jacobs 4/61 (15 overs)
229 (59.3 overs); Jermaine Blackwood 81 (126); Imran Khan 5/50 (18.3 overs)		205 (56 overs); Imran Khan 52 (80); Nikita Miller 9/41 (22 overs)

Jamaica won by 132 runs
Sabina Park, Kingston
Umpires: Gregory Brathwaite and Verdayne Smith
Player of the match: Nikita Miller (Jamaica)

- Jamaica won the toss and elected to bat.
- Nikita Miller took nine consecutive wickets in the second innings before Damion Jacobs took the final wicket. His figures of 9/41 were the best in West Indies' domestic cricket.

9–12 December 2016
Scorecard

Windward Islands	v	Leeward Islands
291 (64.2 overs); Liam Sebastien 80* (162); Gavin Tonge 5/56 (11 overs)		259 (97.5 overs); Jahmar Hamilton 94 (140); Shane Shillingford 5/96 (37.5 overs)
333/8d (82.1 overs); Tyrone Theophile 96 (113); Gavin Tonge 3/48 (10.1 overs)		273 (80.2 overs); Jahmar Hamilton 125 (134); Liam Sebastien 4/67 (22 overs)

Windward Islands won by 94 runs
Windsor Park, Roseau
Umpires: Danesh Ramdhanie and Leslie Reifer
Player of the match: Liam Sebastien (Windward Islands)

- Leeward Islands won the toss and elected to field.
- Taryck Gabriel (Windward Islands) made his first-class debut.

9–12 December 2016 (D/N)
Scorecard

Guyana	v	Barbados
311 (88.2 overs); Shivnarine Chanderpaul 100 (141); Kemar Roach 3/47 (16 overs)		288 (104.1 overs); Shai Hope 70 (231); Veerasammy Permaul 4/68 (34 overs)
137 (35.2 overs); Shimron Hetmyer 67 (83); Roston Chase 5/41 (13 overs)		25/3 (8.1 overs); Shamarh Brooks 11* (17); Raymon Reifer 2/13 (4 overs)

Match drawn
Guyana National Stadium, Providence
Umpires: Shannon Crawford and Peter Nero
Player of the match: Shimron Hetmyer (Guyana)

- Guyana won the toss and elected to bat.

=== Round 5 ===
15–18 December 2016 (D/N)
Scorecard

Leeward Islands	v	Jamaica
243 (80.5 overs); Jahmar Hamilton 103 (200); Damion Jacobs 5/103 (37 overs)		550/7d (117.3 overs); Brandon King 194 (218); Rahkeem Cornwall 2/68 (21 overs)
234 (72 overs); Chesney Hughes 54 (152); Damion Jacobs 5/64 (18 overs)

Jamaica won by an innings and 73 runs
Warner Park, Basseterre
Umpires: Zahid Bassarath and Leslie Reifer
Player of the match: Brandon King (Jamaica)

- Leeward Islands won the toss and elected to bat.

16–19 December 2016
Scorecard

Trinidad and Tobago	v	Guyana
162 (53.2 overs); Roshon Primus 42 (65); Veerasammy Permaul 3/30 (14 overs)		378 (108.2 overs); Shivnarine Chanderpaul 143 (231); Imran Khan 4/78 (24 overs)
235 (95 overs); Isaiah Rajah 63 (114); Veerasammy Permaul 5/53 (28 overs)		21/0 (2.4 overs); Shimron Hetmyer 17* (12)

Guyana won by 10 wickets
Guyana National Stadium, Providence
Umpires: Nigel Duguid and Christopher Taylor
Player of the match: Shivnarine Chanderpaul (Guyana)

- Trinidad and Tobago won the toss and elected to bat.

16–19 December 2016
Scorecard

Barbados	v	Windward Islands
200/8d (63.4 overs); Kevin Stoute 50* (63); Mervin Matthew 4/52 (18 overs)		42/0 (11 overs); Tyrone Theophile 27* (35)

Match drawn
Kensington Oval, Bridgetown
Umpires: Jonathan Blades and Joel Wilson

- Windward Islands won the toss and elected to field.
- Audley Alexander and Roland Cato (Windward Islands) both made their first-class debuts.

=== Round 6 ===
10–13 March 2017
Scorecard

Jamaica	v	Guyana
255 (70.3 overs); Chadwick Walton 101 (173); Keon Joseph 7/53 (15.3 overs)		262 (88.3 overs); Shimron Hetmyer 74 (79); Nikita Miller 4/69 (34 overs)
188 (62.2 overs); Jermaine Blackwood 37 (38); Raymon Reifer 5/60 (16.2 overs)		184/3 (54 overs); Vishaul Singh 63* (183); Marquino Mindley 1/19 (10 overs)

Guyana won by 7 wickets
Sabina Park, Kingston
Umpires: Verdayne Smith and Joel Wilson
Player of the match: Raymon Reifer (Guyana)

- Guyana won the toss and elected to field.
- Romario Shepherd (Guyana) made his first-class debut.

10–13 March 2017
Scorecard

Trinidad and Tobago	v	Windward Islands
275 (102 overs); Yannic Cariah 102* (212); Kyle Mayers 4/24 (13 overs)		104 (46.5 overs); Shane Shillingford 34 (82); Sheldon Cottrell 3/30 (9 overs)
203/5d (68 overs); Kyle Hope 105* (212); Kyle Mayers 1/20 (6 overs)		202 (81.3 overs); Devon Smith 49 (157); Imran Khan 5/67 (25 overs)

Trinidad and Tobago won by 172 runs
National Cricket Stadium, Grenada
Umpires: Jonathan Blades and Deighton Butler
Player of the match: Imran Khan (Trinidad and Tobago)

- Windward Islands won the toss and elected to field.
- Nicholas Alexis (Trinidad and Tobago) and Shermon Lewis (Windward Islands) both made their first-class debuts.

11–14 March 2017
Scorecard

Barbados	v	Leeward Islands
313 (100.2 overs); Shamarh Brooks 63 (116); Alzarri Joseph 5/42 (24.2 overs)		163 (61.2 overs); Nkrumah Bonner 70 (169); Kemar Roach 3/29 (14 overs)
		124 (59 overs) (f/o); Keacy Carty 79 (181); Kemar Roach 4/18 (16 overs)

Barbados won by an innings and 26 runs
Kensington Oval, Bridgetown
Umpires: Graham Lloyd and Leslie Reifer
Player of the match: Kemar Roach (Barbados)

- Barbados won the toss and elected to bat.
- Jermaine Otto (Leeward Islands) made his first-class debut.

=== Round 7 ===
17–20 March 2017
Scorecard

Windward Islands	v	Barbados
293 (85 overs); Devon Smith 103 (196); Kemar Roach 4/22 (15 overs)		324 (76.5 overs); Kevin Stoute 61 (82); Shermon Lewis 3/56 (14 overs)
71 (25.1 overs); Shane Shillingford 16 (13); Roston Chase 7/22 (12.1 overs)		41/1 (4 overs); Anthony Alleyne 26 (15); Liam Sebastien 1/12 (1 over)

Barbados won by 9 wickets
Kensington Oval, Bridgetown
Umpires: Zahid Bassarath and Gregory Brathwaite
Player of the match: Roston Chase (Barbados)

- Windward Islands won the toss and elected to bat.

17–20 March 2017
Scorecard

Trinidad and Tobago	v	Guyana
202 (76.1 overs); Isaiah Rajah 41 (96); Romario Shepherd 2/36 (16.2 overs)		330 (124 overs); Assad Fudadin 57 (135); Marlon Richards 4/57 (25 overs)
183 (57.5 overs); Isaiah Rajah 40 (84); Veerasammy Permaul 7/48 (25.5 overs)		56/0 (12.4 overs); Shimron Hetmyer 44* (40)

Guyana won by 10 wickets
Queen's Park Oval, Port of Spain
Umpires: Graham Lloyd and Peter Nero
Player of the match: Veerasammy Permaul (Guyana)

- Trinidad and Tobago won the toss and elected to bat.
- Keemo Paul (Guyana) and Anderson Phillip (Trinidad and Tobago) both made their first-class debuts.

17–20 March 2017 (D/N)
Scorecard

Leeward Islands	v	Jamaica
71 (34.4 overs); Rahkeem Cornwall 29 (41); Jerome Taylor 5/31 (14 overs)		56 (29.1 overs); Andre McCarthy 13 (41); Jeremiah Louis 4/4 (10 overs)
133 (50 overs); Jahmar Hamilton 45 (98); Rovman Powell 2/12 (7 overs)		114 (37.5 overs); Jermaine Blackwood 47 (90); Alzarri Joseph 5/43 (15.5 overs)

Leeward Islands won by 34 runs
Sabina Park, Kingston
Umpires: Christopher Taylor and Joel Wilson
Player of the match: Jeremiah Louis (Leeward Islands)

- Jamaica won the toss and elected to field.
- No play was possible on day 1.

=== Round 8 ===
23–27 March 2017
Scorecard

Barbados	v	Guyana
480/3d (137 overs); Shai Hope 215* (391); Romario Shepherd 2/111 (27 overs)		250 (89.2 overs); Anthony Bramble 77 (115); Miguel Cummins 5/41 (18.2 overs)
322 (119.2 overs); Shivnarine Chanderpaul 63 (113); Miguel Cummins 3/57 (22 overs)		75/5 (12 overs); Shai Hope 35 (34); Raymon Reifer 4/49 (6 overs)

Match drawn
Kensington Oval, Bridgetown
Umpires: Jonathan Blades and Patrick Gustard
Player of the match: Shai Hope (Barbados)

- Barbados won the toss and elected to bat.
- Keon Harding (Barbados) and Clinton Pestano (Guyana) both made their first-class debuts.
- There was no play on 26 March, as the venue was used for the Twenty20 International fixture between the West Indies and Pakistan.

24–27 March 2017
Scorecard

Windward Islands	v	Leeward Islands
540 (127 overs); Sunil Ambris 231 (256); Rahkeem Cornwall 4/151 (44 overs)		240 (89.3 overs); Nkrumah Bonner 55 (108); Shane Shillingford 6/78 (34.3 overs)
351 (114.4 overs); Keacy Carty 103 (178); Shane Shillingford 6/114 (34.4 overs)		52/3 (14.4 overs); Tyrone Theophile 32* (52); Rahkeem Cornwall 3/23 (7.4 overs)

Windward Islands won by 7 wickets
Warner Park, Basseterre
Umpires: Danesh Ramdhanie and Carl Tuckett
Player of the match: Sunil Ambris (Windward Islands)

- Leeward Islands won the toss and elected to field.

24–27 March 2017
Scorecard

Jamaica	v	Trinidad and Tobago
201 (50.4 overs); Jermaine Blackwood 68 (84); Imran Khan 4/28 (9.4 overs)		174 (84.2 overs); Kyle Hope 67 (219); Nikita Miller 4/39 (28 overs)
201 (55.3 overs); Fabian Allen 60 (68); Rayad Emrit 3/30 (8 overs)		141 (43.5 overs); Marlon Richards 47 (42); Nikita Miller 5/45 (16.5 overs)

Jamaica won by 87 runs
Queen's Park Oval, Port of Spain
Umpires: Zahid Bassarath and Deighton Butler

- Trinidad and Tobago won the toss and elected to field.

=== Round 9 ===
7–10 April 2017
Scorecard

Jamaica	v	Windward Islands
56 (19.4 overs); Oraine Williams 15 (18); Kyle Mayers 6/29 (9.4 overs)		223/9d (88 overs); Devon Smith 100* (253); Nikita Miller 5/58 (36 overs)
262 (75.2 overs); Fabian Allen 77 (95); Shane Shillingford 7/91 (30.2 overs)		96/2 (28.4 overs); Tyrone Theophile 36 (72); Dennis Bulli 1/15 (4 overs)

Windward Islands won by 8 wickets
Arnos Vale Stadium, Kingstown, St Vincent
Umpires: Deighton Butler and Leslie Reifer
Player of the match: Devon Smith (Windward Islands)

- Jamaica won the toss and elected to bat.
- Oraine Williams (Jamaica) made his first-class debut.

7–10 April 2017 (D/N)
Scorecard

Trinidad and Tobago	v	Barbados
196 (68.1 overs); Roshon Primus 60 (80); Kevin Stoute 4/51 (18 overs)		168 (64 overs); Kevin Stoute 81* (137); Roshon Primus 4/21 (10 overs)
211 (59.3 overs); Roshon Primus 51 (62); Justin Greaves 5/63 (17 overs)		109 (40 overs); Justin Greaves 20 (36); Roshon Primus 5/21 (9 overs)

Trinidad and Tobago won by 130 runs
Kensington Oval, Bridgetown
Umpires: Jonathan Blades and Christopher Taylor
Player of the match: Roshon Primus (Trinidad and Tobago)

- Trinidad and Tobago won the toss and elected to bat.
- Preston McSween, Rachid O'Neale (Barbados), Akiel Cooper, Amir Jangoo and Tion Webster (Trinidad and Tobago) all made their first-class debuts.

21–24 April 2017
Scorecard

Guyana	v	Leeward Islands
187 (62.4 overs); Leon Johnson 33 (74); Rahkeem Cornwall 6/68 (26.4 overs)		306 (127.2 overs); Jacques Taylor 72 (160); Raymon Reifer 6/74 (30 overs)
143 (53.3 overs); Chandrapaul Hemraj 29 (59); Gavin Tonge 3/33 (16 overs)		25/0 (9.1 overs); Chesney Hughes 14* (20)

Leeward Islands won by 10 wickets
Providence Stadium, Guyana
Umpires: Nigel Duguid and Danesh Ramdhanie
Player of the match: Rahkeem Cornwall (Leeward Islands)

- Guyana won the toss and elected to bat.
- This match was original scheduled to be played between 7–10 April 2017.
- Akenie Adams, Bhaskar Yadram (Guyana) and Elvin Berridge (Leeward Islands) all made their first-class debuts.

=== Round 10 ===
15–18 April 2017
Scorecard

Windward Islands	v	Guyana
95 (28.1 overs); Sunil Ambris 29 (42); Keemo Paul 6/28 (10.1 overs)		379 (112 overs); Assad Fudadin 125 (189); Delorn Johnson 5/46 (23 overs)
162 (46.1 overs); Devon Smith 61 (117); Gudakesh Motie 4/45 (9 overs)

Guyana won by an innings and 122 runs
Providence Stadium, Guyana
Umpires: Zahid Bassarath and Shannon Crawford
Player of the match: Keemo Paul (Guyana)

- Windward Islands won the toss and elected to bat.
- Sherfane Rutherford (Guyana) made his first-class debut.

15–18 April 2017
Scorecard

Trinidad and Tobago	v	Leeward Islands
553 (135.4 overs); Yannic Cariah 196 (261); Jason Campbell 3/100 (29 overs)		299 (107.5 overs); Chesney Hughes 71 (133); Imran Khan 5/66 (28 overs)
		237 (79.5 overs) (f/o); Montcin Hodge 96 (222); Imran Khan 6/74 (32.5 overs)

Trinidad and Tobago won by an innings and 17 runs
Warner Park, Basseterre
Umpires: Patrick Gustard and Carl Tuckett
Player of the match: Imran Khan (Trinidad and Tobago)

- Leeward Islands won the toss and elected to field.

15–18 April 2017
Scorecard

Barbados	v	Jamaica
377 (118.1 overs); Justin Greaves 114 (205); Derval Green 3/57 (17 overs)		224 (64.3 overs); Devon Thomas 59 (78); Justin Greaves 3/40 (9 overs)
187 (57.1 overs); Kevin Stoute 52 (102); Nikita Miller 4/46 (22.1 overs)		314 (87.1 overs); Chadwick Walton 93 (181); Jomel Warrican 5/87 (26.1 overs)

Barbados won by 26 runs
Kensington Oval, Bridgetown
Umpires: Peter Nero and Leslie Reifer
Player of the match: Justin Greaves (Barbados)

- Jamaica won the toss and elected to field.
- Ryan Wiggins (Barbados) made his first-class debut.
