= 2019 Caribbean Premier League =

Seventh season of the Caribbean Premier League

- Dates: 4 September – 12 October 2019
- Administrator: CPL Limited
- Cricket format: Twenty20
- Tournament format(s): Group stage and knockout
- Champions: Barbados Tridents (2nd title)
- Runners-up: Guyana Amazon Warriors
- Participants: 6
- Matches: 34
- Attendance: 400,273 (11,773 per match)
- Player of the series: Hayden Walsh Jr. (Barbados Tridents)
- Most runs: Brandon King (Guyana Amazon Warriors) (496)
- Most wickets: Hayden Walsh Jr. (Barbados Tridents) (22)
- Official website: cplt20.com

The 2019 Caribbean Premier League (CPLT20) or for sponsorship reasons, Hero CPL 2019 was the seventh season of the Caribbean Premier League, the domestic Twenty20 cricket league in the West Indies. Matches were played in six countries – Trinidad and Tobago, Saint Kitts and Nevis, Guyana, Barbados, Jamaica and Saint Lucia. Originally, the tournament was scheduled to start on 21 August 2019. However, this was pushed back to 4 September 2019, to avoid clashing with India's tour to the West Indies.

In August 2019, the St Lucia Stars franchise team was axed from the tournament, with the CPL looking to replace the team. They were later replaced by the returning St Lucia Zouks franchise.

The Barbados Tridents won the tournament, claiming their second CPL title, after beating the Guyana Amazon Warriors by 27 runs in the final.

== Squads ==
The following players were selected for the tournament:

Barbados Tridents	Guyana Amazon Warriors	Jamaica Tallawahs	St Kitts & Nevis Patriots	St Lucia Zouks	Trinbago Knight Riders
Jason Holder (c); Alex Hales; Asif Ali; Wahab Riaz; Sandeep Lamichhane; Johnson Charles; Shai Hope; Ashley Nurse; Imad Wasim; Jonathan Carter; Chemar Holder; Leniko Boucher; Roshon Primus; Raymon Reifer; Justin Greaves; Joshua Bishop; Hayden Walsh Jr.; Josh Lalor; JP Duminy; Dan Christian; Harry Gurney; Shakib Al Hasan; Phil Salt	Shoaib Malik (c); Nicholas Pooran; Shadab Khan; Shimron Hetmyer; Ben Laughlin; Chris Green; Keemo Paul; Sherfane Rutherford; Brandon King; Romario Shepherd; Odean Smith; Keagan Simmons; Chandrapaul Hemraj; Veerasammy Permaul; Anthony Bramble; Clinton Pestano; Saurabh Netravalkar; Imran Tahir; Qais Ahmad	Chris Gayle (c); Chadwick Walton; Andre Russell; Rovman Powell; Zahir Khan; Oshane Thomas; Glenn Phillips; George Worker; Amad Butt; Christopher Lamont; Shamar Springer; Ramaal Lewis; Steven Jacobs; Derval Green; Javelle Glen; Imran Khan; Xavier Marshall; Kennar Lewis; Jerome Taylor; Dwayne Smith; Jade Dernbach; Jermaine Blackwood; Liton Das; Trevon Griffith	Carlos Brathwaite (c); Isuru Udana; Fabian Allen; Evin Lewis; ~~Rassie van der Dussen~~; Laurie Evans; Sheldon Cottrell; Devon Thomas; Rayad Emrit; Shamarh Brooks; Jeremiah Louis; Dominic Drakes; ~~Afif Hossain~~; Keron Cottoy; Akeem Jordan; Usama Mir; Aaron Jones; Mohammad Hafeez; Jason Mohammed; Kjorn Ottley; Alzarri Joseph	Darren Sammy (c); Lasith Malinga; Fawad Ahmed; Thisara Perera; Andre Fletcher; Kesrick Williams; John Campbell; Niroshan Dickwella; Obed McCoy; Rahkeem Cornwall; Roland Cato; Jeavor Royal; Andre McCarthy; Beuran Hendricks; Christopher Barnwell; Keddy Lesporis; Nitish Kumar; Krishmar Santokie; Colin de Grandhomme; Najibullah Zadran; Cameron Delport; Hardus Viljoen; Kavem Hodge; Jahmar Hamilton; Colin Ingram	Kieron Pollard (c); Dwayne Bravo; Sunil Narine; Colin Munro; Denesh Ramdin; Darren Bravo; Mohammad Hasnain; Khary Pierre; James Neesham; Seekkuge Prasanna; Amir Jangoo; Anderson Phillip; Mark Deyal; Tion Webster; Javon Searles; Akeal Hosein; Ali Khan; Lendl Simmons; Chris Jordan

== Points table ==
Pos	Team	Pld	W	L	NR	Pts	NRR
1	Guyana Amazon Warriors	10	10	0	0	20	1.724
2	Barbados Tridents	10	5	5	0	10	0.518
3	St Kitts & Nevis Patriots	10	5	5	0	10	−0.155
4	Trinbago Knight Riders	10	4	5	1	9	−0.026
5	St Lucia Zouks	10	3	6	1	7	−0.740
6	Jamaica Tallawahs	10	2	8	0	4	−1.478

- Top four teams advanced to the Playoffs
- advanced to the Qualifier 1
- advanced to the Eliminator

== League stage ==
The complete fixture was released on 28 May 2019. All times are in the respective local times.

4 September 2019 (D/N)
Scorecard

(H) Trinbago Knight Riders; 152/7 (20 overs)	v	St Kitts & Nevis Patriots; 141 (19.4 overs)
Kieron Pollard 47 (32); Sheldon Cottrell 3/13 (4 overs)		Evin Lewis 36 (27); James Neesham 3/18 (2.4 overs)

Trinbago Knight Riders won by 11 runs
Queen's Park Oval, Port of Spain
Umpires: Zahid Bassarath (WI) and Leslie Reifer (WI)
Player of the match: James Neesham (Trinbago Knight Riders)

- St Kitts & Nevis Patriots won the toss and elected to field.
- Kjorn Ottley (St Kitts & Nevis Patriots) made his T20 debut.

5 September 2019 (D/N)
Scorecard

(H) Guyana Amazon Warriors; 155/9 (20 overs)	v	St Lucia Zouks; 142/9 (20 overs)
Keemo Paul 38 (22); Obed McCoy 4/41 (4 overs)		Rahkeem Cornwall 36 (14); Shadab Khan 3/16 (4 overs)

Guyana Amazon Warriors won by 13 runs
Providence Stadium, Providence
Umpires: Gregory Brathwaite (WI) and Nigel Duguid (WI)
Player of the match: Chris Green (Guyana Amazon Warriors)

- St Lucia Zouks won the toss and elected to field.

6 September 2019 (D/N)
Scorecard

(H) Trinbago Knight Riders; 191/4 (20 overs)	v	Jamaica Tallawahs; 169/6 (20 overs)
Tion Webster 66* (49); Steven Jacobs 1/14 (2 overs)		George Worker 46* (33); Sunil Narine 2/23 (4 overs)

Trinbago Knight Riders won by 22 runs
Queen's Park Oval, Port of Spain
Umpires: Shaun George (SA) and Leslie Reifer (WI)
Player of the match: Sunil Narine (Trinbago Knight Riders)

- Jamaica Tallawahs won the toss and elected to field.

7 September 2019 (D/N)
Scorecard

St Kitts & Nevis Patriots; 153/8 (20 overs)	v	Guyana Amazon Warriors (H); 159/2 (18.5 overs)
Devon Thomas 62 (49); Shadab Khan 2/20 (4 overs)		Shimron Hetmyer 70* (47); Carlos Brathwaite 1/28 (3 overs)

Guyana Amazon Warriors won by 8 wickets
Providence Stadium, Providence
Umpires: Nigel Duguid (WI) and Langton Rusere (Zim)
Player of the match: Shimron Hetmyer (Guyana Amazon Warriors)

- Guyana Amazon Warriors won the toss and elected to field.

8 September 2019
Scorecard

St Lucia Zouks; 167/5 (20 overs)	v	Trinbago Knight Riders (H); 168/3 (17.5 overs)
John Campbell 43 (42); James Neesham 2/33 (4 overs)		Lendl Simmons 63 (39); Kavem Hodge 1/30 (4 overs)

Trinbago Knight Riders won by 7 wickets
Queen's Park Oval, Port of Spain
Umpires: Zahid Bassarath (WI) and Shaun George (SA)
Player of the match: Lendl Simmons (Trinbago Knight Riders)

- St Lucia Zouks won the toss and elected to bat.

8 September 2019 (D/N)
Scorecard

(H) Guyana Amazon Warriors; 180/4 (20 overs)	v	Barbados Tridents; 133 (16.4 overs)
Chandrapaul Hemraj 63 (55); Roshon Primus 2/35 (4 overs)		Ashley Nurse 40 (25); Romario Shepherd 4/13 (2.4 overs)

Guyana Amazon Warriors won by 47 runs
Providence Stadium, Providence
Umpires: Gregory Brathwaite (WI) and Langton Rusere (Zim)
Player of the match: Nicholas Pooran (Guyana Amazon Warriors)

- Barbados Tridents won the toss and elected to field.
- Leniko Boucher (Barbados Tridents) made his T20 debut.

10 September 2019 (D/N)
Scorecard

Jamaica Tallawahs; 241/4 (20 overs)	v	St Kitts & Nevis Patriots (H); 242/6 (18.5 overs)
Chris Gayle 116 (62); Fabian Allen 2/30 (2 overs)		Devon Thomas 71 (40); Oshane Thomas 4/53 (4 overs)

St Kitts & Nevis Patriots won by 4 wickets
Warner Park Sporting Complex, Basseterre
Umpires: Zahid Bassarath (WI) and Leslie Reifer (WI)
Player of the match: Evin Lewis (St Kitts & Nevis Patriots)

- St Kitts & Nevis Patriots won the toss and elected to field.

11 September 2019 (D/N)
Scorecard

Barbados Tridents; 186/2 (20 overs)	v	(H) St Kitts & Nevis Patriots; 168/9 (20 overs)
Leniko Boucher 62* (47); Usama Mir 1/30 (4 overs)		Laurie Evans 64 (41); Sandeep Lamichhane 3/22 (4 overs)

Barbados Tridents won by 18 runs
Warner Park Sporting Complex, Basseterre
Umpires: Shaun George (SA) and Leslie Reifer (WI)
Player of the match: Sandeep Lamichhane (Barbados Tridents)

- St Kitts & Nevis Patriots won the toss and elected to field.

12 September 2019 (D/N)
Scorecard

(H) Jamaica Tallawahs; 170/5 (20 overs)	v	St Lucia Zouks; 171/5 (16.4 overs)
Glenn Phillips 58 (34); Fawad Ahmed 2/28 (4 overs)		Rahkeem Cornwall 75 (30); Oshane Thomas 3/26 (4 overs)

St Lucia Zouks won by 5 wickets
Sabina Park, Kingston
Umpires: Gregory Brathwaite (WI) and Nigel Duguid (WI)
Player of the match: Rahkeem Cornwall (St Lucia Zouks)

- St Lucia Zouks won the toss and elected to field.
- Derval Green, Ramaal Lewis (Jamaica Tallawahs) and Roland Cato (St Lucia Zouks) all made their T20 debuts.

13 September 2019 (D/N)
Scorecard

Trinbago Knight Riders; 267/2 (20 overs)	v	(H) Jamaica Tallawahs; 226/5 (20 overs)
Colin Munro 96* (50); Zahir Khan 1/42 (3 overs)		Glenn Phillips 62 (32); Mohammad Hasnain 2/51 (4 overs)

Trinbago Knight Riders won by 41 runs
Sabina Park, Kingston
Umpires: Nigel Duguid (WI) and Langton Rusere (Zim)
Player of the match: Colin Munro (Trinbago Knight Riders)

- Jamaica Tallawahs won the toss and elected to field.
- Javelle Glen (Jamaica Tallawahs) made his T20 debut.
- Trinbago Knight Riders scored the highest team total in CPL.

14 September 2019 (D/N)
Scorecard

(H) St Kitts & Nevis Patriots; 121 (19 overs)	v	Guyana Amazon Warriors; 122/3 (15.5 overs)
Shamarh Brooks 34 (25); Qais Ahmad 3/28 (4 overs)		Brandon King 49 (24); Rayad Emrit 1/15 (2 overs)

Guyana Amazon Warriors won by 7 wickets
Warner Park Sporting Complex, Basseterre
Umpires: Zahid Bassarath (WI) and Shaun George (SA)
Player of the match: Qais Ahmad (Guyana Amazon Warriors)

- Guyana Amazon Warriors won the toss and elected to field.

15 September 2019
Scorecard

Barbados Tridents; 140/9 (20 overs)	v	(H) Jamaica Tallawahs; 145/6 (18.3 overs)
Ashley Nurse 37 (18); Zahir Khan 3/20 (4 overs)		Chadwick Walton 51* (42); Jason Holder 2/21 (4 overs)

Jamaica Tallawahs won by 4 wickets
Sabina Park, Kingston
Umpires: Gregory Brathwaite (WI) and Langton Rusere (Zim)
Player of the match: Chadwick Walton (Jamaica Tallawahs)

- Jamaica Tallawahs won the toss and elected to field.

15 September 2019 (D/N)
Scorecard

St Lucia Zouks; 138/9 (20 overs)	v	(H) St Kitts & Nevis Patriots; 143/4 (14.5 overs)
Colin de Grandhomme 30 (22); Akeem Jordan 4/33 (4 overs)		Evin Lewis 65 (30); Fawad Ahmed 1/11 (4 overs)

St Kitts & Nevis Patriots won by 6 wickets
Warner Park Sporting Complex, Basseterre
Umpires: Zahid Bassarath (WI) and Leslie Reifer (WI)
Player of the match: Akeem Jordan (St Kitts & Nevis Patriots)

- St Kitts & Nevis Patriots won the toss and elected to field.
- Akeem Jordan (St Kitts & Nevis Patriots) made his T20 debut.

17 September 2019 (D/N)
Scorecard

Trinbago Knight Riders; 216/4 (20 overs)	v	(H) St Kitts & Nevis Patriots; 216/7 (20 overs)
Lendl Simmons 90 (45); Carlos Brathwaite 2/48 (4 overs)		Carlos Brathwaite 64 (30); Anderson Phillip 3/38 (4 overs)

Match tied
(St Kitts & Nevis Patriots won the Super Over)
Warner Park Sporting Complex, Basseterre
Umpires: Shaun George (SA) and Leslie Reifer (WI)
Player of the match: Carlos Brathwaite (St Kitts & Nevis Patriots)

- St Kitts & Nevis Patriots won the toss and elected to field.

18 September 2019 (D/N)
Scorecard

Guyana Amazon Warriors; 218/6 (20 overs)	v	(H) Jamaica Tallawahs; 137 (17.3 overs)
Shoaib Malik 67* (37); Andre Russell 2/35 (4 overs)		Andre Russell 40 (19); Keemo Paul 3/34 (3 overs)

Guyana Amazon Warriors won by 81 runs
Sabina Park, Kingston
Umpires: Gregory Brathwaite (WI) and Nigel Duguid (WI)
Player of the match: Imran Tahir (Guyana Amazon Warriors)

- Jamaica Tallawahs won the toss and elected to field.

19 September 2019 (D/N)
Scorecard

St Kitts & Nevis Patriots; 176/6 (20 overs)	v	(H) Jamaica Tallawahs; 156 (19.5 overs)
Fabian Allen 62* (27); Andre Russell 1/17 (3 overs)		Glenn Phillips 87 (49); Rayad Emrit 2/21 (3 overs)

St Kitts & Nevis Patriots won by 20 runs
Sabina Park, Kingston
Umpires: Nigel Duguid (WI) and Langton Rusere (Zim)
Player of the match: Fabian Allen (St Kitts & Nevis Patriots)

- Jamaica Tallawahs won the toss and elected to field.

20 September 2019 (D/N)
Scorecard

Barbados Tridents; 172/6 (20 overs)	v	(H) St Lucia Zouks; 101 (14.5 overs)
Justin Greaves 57 (45); Kesrick Williams 3/44 (4 overs)		Hardus Viljoen 31 (21); Jason Holder 2/24 (4 overs)

Barbados Tridents won by 71 runs
Darren Sammy Cricket Ground, Gros Islet
Umpires: Zahid Bassarath (WI) and Shaun George (SA)
Player of the match: Jonathan Carter (Barbados Tridents)

- St Lucia Zouks won the toss and elected to field.
- Joshua Bishop and Justin Greaves (Barbados Tridents) both made their T20 debuts.

21 September 2019 (D/N)
Scorecard

(H) St Lucia Zouks; 99/4 (12.2 overs)	v	Trinbago Knight Riders
Colin Ingram 52* (34); James Neesham 1/10 (1 over)

No result
Darren Sammy Cricket Ground, Gros Islet
Umpires: Zahid Bassarath (WI) and Leslie Reifer (WI)

- Trinbago Knight Riders won the toss and elected to field.
- No further play was possible due to rain.
- Jeavor Royal (St Lucia Zouks) made his T20 debut.

22 September 2019 (D/N)
Scorecard

(H) Barbados Tridents; 138 (19.2 overs)	v	Guyana Amazon Warriors; 81/2 (11 overs)
JP Duminy 38 (32); Chris Green 4/14 (3.2 overs)		Brandon King 51* (34); JP Duminy 1/16 (3 overs)

Guyana Amazon Warriors won by 12 runs (DLS method)
Kensington Oval, Bridgetown
Umpires: Gregory Brathwaite (WI) and Langton Rusere (Zim)
Player of the match: Chris Green (Guyana Amazon Warriors)

- Guyana Amazon Warriors won the toss and elected to field.
- Guyana Amazon Warriors were set a revised target of 70 runs from 11 overs due to rain.

23 September 2019 (D/N)
Scorecard

Jamaica Tallawahs; 127 (20 overs)	v	(H) Barbados Tridents; 122/9 (20 overs)
Glenn Phillips 41 (35); Sandeep Lamichhane 2/17 (4 overs)		Johnson Charles 31 (35); Imran Khan 3/19 (4 overs)

Jamaica Tallawahs won by 5 runs
Kensington Oval, Bridgetown
Umpires: Gregory Brathwaite (WI) and Nigel Duguid (WI)
Player of the match: Shamar Springer (Jamaica Tallawahs)

- Barbados Tridents won the toss and elected to field.

24 September 2019 (D/N)
Scorecard

(H) St Lucia Zouks; 165/6 (20 overs)	v	St Kitts & Nevis Patriots; 145/9 (20 overs)
Andre Fletcher 36 (23); Mohammad Hafeez 3/22 (4 overs)		Mohammad Hafeez 29 (31); Hardus Viljoen 3/14 (4 overs)

St Lucia Zouks won by 20 runs
Darren Sammy Cricket Ground, Gros Islet
Umpires: Shaun George (SA) and Leslie Reifer (WI)
Player of the match: Hardus Viljoen (St Lucia Stars)

- St Kitts & Nevis Patriots won the toss and elected to field.

25 September 2019 (D/N)
Scorecard

(H) St Lucia Zouks; 161/7 (20 overs)	v	Guyana Amazon Warriors; 162/2 (18.2 overs)
Colin de Grandhomme 65 (37); Ben Laughlin 3/12 (3 overs)		Brandon King 81* (59); Fawad Ahmed 1/24 (4 overs)

Guyana Amazon Warriors won by 8 wickets
Darren Sammy Cricket Ground, Gros Islet
Umpires: Zahid Bassarath (WI) and Shaun George (SA)
Player of the match: Brandon King (Guyana Amazon Warriors)

- St Lucia Zouks won the toss and elected to bat.

26 September 2019 (D/N)
Scorecard

(H) Barbados Tridents; 192/5 (20 overs)	v	Trinbago Knight Riders; 129 (17.4 overs)
JP Duminy 65 (20); Khary Pierre 2/24 (4 overs)		Darren Bravo 28 (24); Hayden Walsh Jr. 5/19 (4 overs)

Barbados Tridents won by 63 runs
Kensington Oval, Bridgetown
Umpires: Nigel Duguid (WI) and Langton Rusere (Zim)
Player of the match: JP Duminy (Barbados Tridents)

- Barbados Tridents won the toss and elected to field.
- JP Duminy (Barbados Tridents) scored the fastest fity in the CPL (15 balls).

27 September 2019 (D/N)
Scorecard

Jamaica Tallawahs; 165/7 (20 overs)	v	(H) St Lucia Zouks; 169/6 (19.1 overs)
Dwayne Smith 58 (38); Kesrick Williams 3/24 (4 overs)		Rahkeem Cornwall 51 (25); Imran Khan 2/34 (4 overs)

St Lucia Zouks won by 4 wickets
Darren Sammy Cricket Ground, Gros Islet
Umpires: Zahid Bassarath (WI) and Leslie Reifer (WI)
Player of the match: Kesrick Williams (St Lucia Zouks)

- St Lucia Zouks won the toss and elected to field.

28 September 2019 (D/N)
Scorecard

St Kitts & Nevis Patriots; 149/7 (20 overs)	v	(H) Barbados Tridents; 148 (20 overs)
Shamarh Brooks 53 (33); Harry Gurney 2/23 (4 overs)		Shakib Al Hasan 38 (25); Sheldon Cottrell 3/27 (4 overs)

St Kitts & Nevis Patriots won by 1 run
Kensington Oval, Bridgetown
Umpires: Gregory Brathwaite (WI) and Langton Rusere (Zim)
Player of the match: Carlos Brathwaite (St Kitts & Nevis Patriots)

- St Kitts & Nevis Patriots won the toss and elected to bat.

29 September 2019 (D/N)
Scorecard

(H) Barbados Tridents; 141/6 (20 overs)	v	St Lucia Zouks; 117 (18.4 overs)
Johnson Charles 47 (36); Krishmar Santokie 2/25 (4 overs)		Colin Ingram 25 (17); Hayden Walsh Jr. 4/26 (3.4 overs)

Barbados Tridents won by 24 runs
Kensington Oval, Bridgetown
Umpires: Gregory Brathwaite (WI) and Nigel Duguid (WI)
Player of the match: Hayden Walsh Jr. (Barbados Tridents)

- Barbados Tridents won the toss and elected to bat.

30 September 2019 (D/N)
Scorecard

Guyana Amazon Warriors; 185/6 (20 overs)	v	(H) Trinbago Knight Riders; 166/5 (20 overs)
Chandrapaul Hemraj 66 (42); Javon Searles 3/39 (3 overs)		Kieron Pollard 71 (38); Chris Green 2/18 (4 overs)

Guyana Amazon Warriors won by 19 runs
Queen's Park Oval, Port of Spain
Umpires: Shaun George (SA) and Leslie Reifer (WI)
Player of the match: Romario Shepherd (Guyana Amazon Warriors)

- Trinbago Knight Riders won the toss and elected to field.

2 October 2019 (D/N)
Scorecard

(H) Trinbago Knight Riders; 134/8 (20 overs)	v	Barbados Tridents; 135/3 (19.4 overs)
Lendl Simmons 60 (45); Harry Gurney 2/14 (4 overs)		Johnson Charles 55 (47); Mark Deyal 1/17 (2 overs)

Barbados Tridents won by 7 wickets
Queen's Park Oval, Port of Spain
Umpires: Zahid Bassarath (WI) and Shaun George (SA)
Player of the match: Harry Gurney (Barbados Tridents)

- Trinbago Knight Riders won the toss and elected to bat.

3 October 2019 (D/N)
Scorecard

(H) Guyana Amazon Warriors; 156/6 (20 overs)	v	Jamaica Tallawahs; 79 (16.3 overs)
Shoaib Malik 73* (45); Derval Green 2/23 (3 overs)		Liton Das 21 (25); Imran Tahir 3/12 (4 overs)

Guyana Amazon Warriors won by 77 runs
Providence Stadium, Providence
Umpires: Nigel Duguid (WI) and Langton Rusere (Zim)
Player of the match: Shoaib Malik (Guyana Amazon Warriors)

- Guyana Amazon Warriors won the toss and elected to bat.

4 October 2019 (D/N)
Scorecard

Trinbago Knight Riders; 143/5 (20 overs)	v	(H) Guyana Amazon Warriors; 144/3 (18.4 overs)
Colin Munro 43 (40); Chandrapaul Hemraj 3/15 (3 overs)		Nicholas Pooran 54* (35); Khary Pierre 1/25 (4 overs)

Guyana Amazon Warriors won by 7 wickets
Providence Stadium, Providence
Umpires: Gregory Brathwaite (WI) and Langton Rusere (Zim)
Player of the match: Nicholas Pooran (Guyana Amazon Warriors)

- Guyana Amazon Warriors won the toss and elected to field.

== Playoffs ==
Qualifier 1/Eliminator
1	Guyana Amazon Warriors	218/3 (20 overs)
2	Barbados Tridents	188/8 (20 overs)
3	St Kitts & Nevis Patriots	125/7 (20 overs)
4	Trinbago Knight Riders	128/4 (18.4 overs)

Qualifier 2
2	Barbados Tridents	160/6 (20 overs)
4	Trinbago Knight Riders	148 (19.3 overs)

Final
1	Guyana Amazon Warriors	144/9 (20 overs)
2	Barbados Tridents	171/6 (20 overs)

=== Eliminator ===
6 October 2019
Scorecard

St Kitts & Nevis Patriots; 125/7 (20 overs)	v	Trinbago Knight Riders; 128/4 (18.4 overs)
Laurie Evans 55 (47); Chris Jordan 3/30 (4 overs)		Lendl Simmons 51 (47); Alzarri Joseph 1/17 (4 overs)

Trinbago Knight Riders won by 6 wickets
Providence Stadium, Providence
Umpires: Gregory Brathwaite (WI) and Shaun George (SA)
Player of the match: Sunil Narine (Trinbago Knight Riders)

- Trinbago Knight Riders won the toss and elected to field.

=== Qualifier 1 ===
6 October 2019 (D/N)
Scorecard

Guyana Amazon Warriors; 218/3 (20 overs)	v	Barbados Tridents; 188/8 (20 overs)
Brandon King 132* (72); Hayden Walsh Jr. 2/42 (4 overs)		Jonathan Carter 49 (26); Romario Shepherd 3/50 (4 overs)

Guyana Amazon Warriors won by 30 runs
Providence Stadium, Providence
Umpires: Nigel Duguid (WI) and Shaun George (SA)
Player of the match: Brandon King (Guyana Amazon Warriors)

- Guyana Amazon Warriors won the toss and elected to bat.

=== Qualifier 2 ===
10 October 2019 (D/N)
Scorecard

Barbados Tridents; 160/6 (20 overs)	v	Trinbago Knight Riders; 148 (19.3 overs)
Johnson Charles 35 (41); Khary Pierre 2/25 (4 overs)		Seekkuge Prasanna 51 (27); Raymon Reifer 2/13 (1.3 overs)

Barbados Tridents won by 12 runs
Brian Lara Cricket Academy, Tarouba
Umpires: Gregory Brathwaite (WI) and Nigel Duguid (WI)
Player of the match: Ashley Nurse (Barbados Tridents)

- Trinbago Knight Riders won the toss and elected to field.

=== Final ===
12 October 2019 (D/N)
Scorecard

Barbados Tridents; 171/6 (20 overs)	v	Guyana Amazon Warriors; 144/9 (20 overs)
Jonathan Carter 50* (27); Imran Tahir 1/24 (4 overs)		Brandon King 43 (33); Raymon Reifer 4/24 (4 overs)

Barbados Tridents won by 27 runs
Brian Lara Cricket Academy, Tarouba
Umpires: Gregory Brathwaite (WI) and Nigel Duguid (WI)
Player of the match: Jonathan Carter (Barbados Tridents)

- Barbados Tridents won the toss and elected to bat.

== Statistics ==
=== Most runs ===
Player	Team	Matches	Runs	High score
Brandon King	Guyana Amazon Warriors	12	496	132 not out
Lendl Simmons	Trinbago Knight Riders	12	430	90
Johnson Charles	Barbados Tridents	13	415	58
Glenn Phillips	Jamaica Tallawahs	10	374	87
Kieron Pollard	Trinbago Knight Riders	12	349	71

- Source: Cricinfo

=== Most wickets ===
Player	Team	Matches	Wickets	Best bowling
Hayden Walsh Jr.	Barbados Tridents	9	22	5/19
Imran Tahir	Guyana Amazon Warriors	9	16	3/12
Raymon Reifer	Barbados Tridents	11	14	4/24
Jason Holder	Barbados Tridents	13	14	2/21
Harry Gurney	Barbados Tridents	8	13	3/17

- Source: Cricinfo
