= Derval Green =

Jamaican cricketer

Personal information
- Full name: Derval Charles Green
- Born: 4 December 1988 (age 37); Trelawny Parish, Jamaica
- Batting: Right-handed
- Bowling: Right-arm medium-fast

Domestic team information
- Years: Team
- 2015-present: Jamaica

Career statistics
| Competition | FC | List A | T20 |
|---|---|---|---|
| Matches | 30 | 24 | 4 |
| Runs scored | 928 | 158 | 42 |
| Batting average | 18.55 | 9.29 | 21.00 |
| 100s/50s | 0/5 | 0/0 | 0/0 |
| Top score | 86 | 32 | 17* |
| Balls bowled | 4,034 | 1,031 | 72 |
| Wickets | 83 | 23 | 3 |
| Bowling average | 24.81 | 41.73 | 42.00 |
| 5 wickets in innings | 1 | 0 | 0 |
| 10 wickets in match | 0 | 0 | 0 |
| Best bowling | 5/75 | 4/44 | 2/23 |
| Catches/stumpings | 13/0 | 6/0 | 0/0 |
- Source: CricketArchive, 9 October 2021

Derval Charles Green (born 4 December 1988) is a Jamaican cricketer who has played for the Jamaica national side in West Indian domestic cricket. He is a right-handed batsman and right-arm medium-fast bowler.

Green was born in Trelawny Parish. He made his List A debut for Jamaica during the 2014–15 Regional Super50, against the Leeward Islands. Green played in all four of his team's matches in the competition, and took six wickets, making him Jamaica's equal leading wicket-taker with Nikita Miller, David Bernard, and Damion Jacobs. His best figures were 3/65 from ten overs, taken against Trinidad and Tobago.

He made his first-class debut for Jamaica in the 2016–17 Regional Four Day Competition on 11 November 2016.

In June 2018, he was named in the Cricket West Indies B Team squad for the inaugural edition of the Global T20 Canada tournament.

He made his Twenty20 debut on 12 September 2019, for the Jamaica Tallawahs, in the 2019 Caribbean Premier League. The following month, he was named in Jamaica's squad for the 2019–20 Regional Super50 tournament.
