= Audley Alexander =

Saint Lucian cricketer (born 1991)

Personal information
- Born: 10 October 1991 (age 35); Saint Lucia
- Batting: Left-handed
- Bowling: Slow left-arm orthodox

Domestic team information
- Years: Team
- 2016/17–2018/19: Windward Islands
- FC debut: 16 December 2016 Windward Islands v Barbados
- LA debut: 8 February 2017 Windward Islands v Leeward Islands

Career statistics
Competition	First-class	List A
Matches	5	2
Runs scored	88	15
Batting average	17.60	–
100s/50s	0/1	0/0
Top score	50*	15*
Balls bowled	513	24
Wickets	6	0
Bowling average	49.16	–
5 wickets in innings	0	–
10 wickets in match	0	–
Best bowling	3/63	–
Catches/stumpings	2/–	0/–
- Source: ESPNcricinfo, 5 May 2025

Audley Alexander (born 10 October 1991) is a Saint Lucian cricketer. He made his first-class debut for the Windward Islands in the 2016–17 Regional Four Day Competition on 16 December 2016. He made his List A debut for the Windward Islands in the 2016–17 Regional Super50 on 8 February 2017.
