= Reynard Leveridge =

Jamaican cricketer (born 1990)

Personal information
- Full name: Reynard Hakeem Leveridge
- Born: 15 September 1990 (age 36); Kingston, Jamaica

Domestic team information
- Years: Team
- 2017: Jamaica

Career statistics
Competition	First-class	List A
Matches	5	9
Runs scored	17	1
Batting average	5.66	0.50
100s/50s	0/0	0/0
Top score	8*	1*
Balls bowled	379	360
Wickets	6	9
Bowling average	40.66	30.66
5 wickets in innings	0	0
10 wickets in match	0	0
Best bowling	2/28	3/38
Catches/stumpings	3/0	0/0
- Source: ESPNcricinfo, 7 May 2017

Reynard Leveridge (born 15 September 1990) is a Jamaican cricketer. He made his first-class debut for West Indies A against Sri Lanka A in Colombo on 4 October 2016. In January 2017 he was named in Jamaica's squad for the 2016–17 Regional Super50 tournament. He made his List A debut for Jamaica in the 2016–17 Regional Super50 on 24 January 2017.
