= Nicholas Alexis =

Trinidadian cricketer

Cricket information
- Batting: Right-handed
- Role: Batsman

Domestic team information
- Years: Team
- 2011/12–2012/13: Combined Campuses
- 2016/17: Trinidad and Tobago

Career statistics
Competition	First-class	List A
Matches	2	15
Runs scored	17	205
Batting average	4.25	14.64
100s/50s	0/0	0/1
Top score	10	50
Catches/stumpings	3/–	1/–
- Source: ESPNcricinfo, 25 March 2025

Nicholas Alexis is a Trinidadian cricketer. He made his List A debut for Combined Campuses and Colleges in the 2011–12 Regional Super50 tournament on 20 October 2011. In January 2017 he was named in Trinidad and Tobago's team for the 2016–17 Regional Super50 tournament. He made his first-class debut for Trinidad and Tobago in the 2016–17 Regional Four Day Competition on 10 March 2017. he is one of two cricketers with the same first name to make their cricket debut the other is Nicholas Pooran who played for the West Indies Cricket Team Under-19 and then went on to play for the West Indies Cricket Team of which he is captain.
