= Damani Sewell =

Jamaican cricketer (born 1994)

Personal information
- Born: 21 August 1994 (age 32); Jamaica
- Batting: Right-handed
- Bowling: Right-arm off-spin

Domestic team information
- Years: Team
- 2017: Jamaica

Career statistics
Competition	List A
Matches	5
Runs scored	29
Batting average	7.25
100s/50s	0/0
Top score	12
Balls bowled	198
Wickets	6
Bowling average	25.50
5 wickets in innings	0
10 wickets in match	0
Best bowling	3/46
Catches/stumpings	2/–
- Source: Cricinfo, 7 March 2017

Damani Sewell (born 21 August 1994) is a Jamaican cricketer. He made his List A debut for Jamaica in the 2016–17 Regional Super50 on 24 January 2017. He made his first-class debut for Jamaica in the 2017–18 Regional Four Day Competition on 26 October 2017.
