= Jermaine Levy =

West Indian cricketer (born 1993)

Personal information
- Born: 30 September 1993 (age 33); Jamaica
- Source: ESPNcricinfo, 24 January 2017

Jermaine Levy (born 30 September 1993) is a Jamaican cricketer. He made his first-class debut for Combined Campuses and Colleges in the 2013–14 Regional Super50 on 28 March 2014. He made his List A debut for Combined Campuses and Colleges in the 2016–17 Regional Super50 on 24 January 2017. In October 2019, he was named in the West Indies Emerging Team for the 2019–20 Regional Super50 tournament.
