= Larry Joseph =

West Indian cricketer (born 1985)

Personal information
- Full name: Larry Nuron Joseph
- Born: 1 April 1985 (age 41); All Saints, Antigua
- Batting: Right-handed
- Bowling: Right-arm off spin

Domestic team information
- Years: Team
- 2012–2013: Leeward Islands
- Source: CricketArchive, 14 January 2016

Larry Nuron Joseph (born 1 April 1985) is an Antiguan cricketer who has played for the Leeward Islands in West Indian domestic cricket. He is a right-arm off-spin bowler.

Joseph made his List A debut in October 2003, playing for the West Indies under-19s in the 2003–04 Red Stripe Bowl. In 2008, he played a single match for the Antigua and Barbuda national team at the 2008 Stanford 20/20 tournament, against Guyana. Joseph made his debut for the Leewards in January 2012, against Trinidad and Tobago in the 2011–12 Regional Super50. He made his first-class debut the following year, appearing three times in the 2012–13 Regional Four Day Competition, but has not played for the team since. His best performance came against Trinidad and Tobago, when he took 4/66 in the second innings.

In October 2019, he was named in the Combined Campuses' squad for the 2019–20 Regional Super50 tournament.
