= Akeem Dewar =

Jamaican cricketer

Personal information
- Full name: Akeem Mark Anthony Dewar
- Born: 30 August 1991 (age 35); Kingston, Jamaica
- Batting: Right-handed
- Bowling: Right-arm leg spin

Domestic team information
- Years: Team
- 2010–2011: Jamaica
- 2011–2016: Combined Campuses
- 2013: Jamaica Tallawahs (CPL)
- Source: CricketArchive, 12 January 2016

Akeem Mark Anthony Dewar (born 30 August 1991) is a Jamaican cricketer who has played for both the Jamaica national team and the Combined Campuses and Colleges in West Indian domestic cricket, as well as representing the Jamaica Tallawahs franchise in the Caribbean Premier League.

A right-arm leg-spin bowler, Dewar played for the West Indies under-19s at the 2010 Under-19 World Cup in New Zealand. His best performance at the tournament came against Bangladesh, when he took 3/63 from ten overs. Dewar made his first-class debut for Jamaica in April 2010, playing against Ireland in the 2009–10 Regional Four Day Competition. He made a further appearance for Jamaica the following season, but for the 2011–12 season switched to the Combined Campuses. Against Barbados in February 2013, Dewar took a maiden first-class five-wicket haul, 7/116. He subsequently signed with the Jamaica Tallawahs franchise for the 2013 Caribbean Premier League season, but played only a single match.
