= Leniko Boucher =

West Indian cricketer (born 1997)

Personal information
- Full name: Leniko Boucher
- Born: 13 September 1997 (age 29)

Domestic team information
- Years: Team
- 2018–: Barbados
- 2019: Barbados Tridents
- 2020–: St Lucia Zouks
- FC debut: 29 January 2025 Barbados v Guyana
- List A debut: 4 October 2018 Barbados v Leeward Islands

Career statistics
Competition	FC	LA	T20
Matches	4	22	8
Runs scored	154	677	120
Batting average	30.80	32.23	24.00
100s/50s	0/2	0/5	0/1
Top score	65	81	62*
Catches/stumpings	11/3	19/1	5/0
- Source: Cricinfo, 4 April 2025

Leniko Boucher (born 13 December 1997) is a Barbadian cricketer. He made his List A debut for Barbados in the 2018–19 Regional Super50 tournament on 4 October 2018. He made his Twenty20 debut on 8 September 2019, for the Barbados Tridents, in the 2019 Caribbean Premier League. In October 2019, he was selected to play for Barbados in the 2019–20 Regional Super50 tournament.

In July 2020, he was named in the St Lucia Zouks squad for the 2020 Caribbean Premier League.
