= Jermaine Otto =

Antiguan cricketer (born 1991)

Personal information
- Born: 2 August 1991 (age 35); Antigua
- Batting: Right-handed

Domestic team information
- Years: Team
- 2016/17: Leeward Islands

Career statistics
Competition	First-class	List A
Matches	4	5
Runs scored	29	98
Batting average	3.62	19.60
100s/50s	0/0	0/0
Top score	10	38
Catches/stumpings	4/0	2/0
- Source: ESPNcricinfo, 25 April 2017

Jermaine Otto (born 2 August 1991) is an Antiguan cricketer. He made his List A debut for the Leeward Islands in the 2016–17 Regional Super50 on 29 January 2017. He made his first-class debut for the Leeward Islands in the 2016–17 Regional Four Day Competition on 11 March 2017.
