= Kadeem Phillip =

Antiguan cricketer (born 1989)

Personal information
- Born: 25 November 1989 (age 36); Antigua
- Batting: Left-handed
- Bowling: Slow left arm orthodox

Domestic team information
- Years: Team
- 2010: Leeward Islands
- 2017: Windward Islands

Career statistics
Competition	List A	T20
Matches	1	1
Runs scored	–	20
Batting average	–	20.00
100s/50s	–	0/0
Top score	–	20
Catches/stumpings	0/–	0/–
- Source: ESPNcricinfo, 9 April 2017

Kadeem Phillip (born 25 November 1989) is an Antiguan cricketer. He made his List A debut for the Windward Islands in the 2016–17 Regional Super50 on 10 February 2017. In October 2019, he was named in the Leeward Islands' squad for the 2019–20 Regional Super50 tournament.
