= Te-Shawn Alleyne =

Trinidadian cricketer (born 1999)

Personal information
- Born: 8 October 1999 (age 27); Trinidad and Tobago
- Source: ESPNcricinfo, 26 January 2017

Te-Shawn Alleyne (born 8 October 1999) is a Trinidadian cricketer. He made his List A debut for the West Indies Under-19s in the 2016–17 Regional Super50 on 25 January 2017.
