= Javier Spencer =

Antiguan cricketer (born 2000)

Personal information
- Born: 28 March 2000 (age 26); Antigua
- Source: ESPNcricinfo, 28 January 2017

Javier Spencer (born 28 March 2000) is an Antiguan cricketer. He made his List A debut for the West Indies Under-19s in the 2016–17 Regional Super50 on 27 January 2017. In May 2018, he was selected to play for the Guyana national cricket team in the Professional Cricket League draft, ahead of the 2018–19 season. In October 2019, he was named in the Leeward Islands' squad for the 2019–20 Regional Super50 tournament.
