= Zaheer Mohamed =

Guyanese cricketer (born 1985)

Personal information
- Full name: Zaheer Mohamed Shadir
- Born: 10 October 1985 (age 41); Georgetown, Guyana
- Batting: Right-handed
- Bowling: Right-arm off spin

Domestic team information
- Years: Team
- 2004–2014: Guyana
- Source: CricketArchive, 18 January 2016

Zaheer Mohamed Shadir (born 10 October 1985) is a Guyanese cricketer who has played for Guyana in West Indian domestic cricket. He is a right-handed batsman and right-arm off-spin bowler.

Mohamed made his first-class debut for Guyana in January 2004, aged 18, playing against the Leeward Islands in the 2003–04 Carib Beer Cup. He played two further matches in his debut season, but after that did not again appear for Guyana until the 2007–08 KFC Cup (a limited-overs tournament). Against the Leeward Islands in the 2007–08 Carib Beer Cup, Mohamed took his best first-class bowling figures to date, 4/49 and 4/40. He scored his maiden first-class half-century during the 2009–10 season (58 not out against Barbados), and has since added several more fifties. Mohamed's most recent matches for Guyana came in April 2014, in the 2013–14 Regional Four Day Competition.
