= Akiel Cooper =

Trinidadian cricketer (born 1990)

Personal information
- Born: 26 November 1990 (age 35); Moruga, Trinidad
- Batting: Right-handed
- Bowling: Right-arm medium
- Role: Allrounder

Domestic team information
- Years: Team
- 2017: Trinidad and Tobago

Career statistics
Competition	First-class
Matches	3
Runs scored	80
Batting average	16.00
100s/50s	0/0
Top score	41
Catches/stumpings	3/–
- Source: Cricinfo, 29 April 2023

Akiel Cooper (born 26 November 1990) is a Trinidad and Tobago cricketer. He made his first-class debut for Trinidad and Tobago in the 2016–17 Regional Four Day Competition on 7 April 2017.
