= Raymond Bynoe =

Barbadian cricketer (born 1993)

Personal information
- Born: 9 May 1993 (age 33); Barbados
- Source: ESPNcricinfo, 4 February 2017

Raymond Bynoe (born 9 May 1993) is a Barbadian cricketer. He made his List A debut for Combined Campuses and Colleges in the 2016–17 Regional Super50 on 3 February 2017.
