= Isaiah Rajah =

West Indian cricketer (born 1993)

Personal information
- Born: 16 October 1993 (age 33); Sangre Grande, Trinidad
- Batting: Left-handed
- Bowling: Legbreak

Domestic team information
- Years: Team
- 2016–present: Trinidad and Tobago

Career statistics
Competition	First-class	List A
Matches	12	3
Runs scored	517	73
Batting average	23.50	36.50
100s/50s	0/2	0/0
Top score	69	39
Catches/stumpings	6/–	0/–
- Source: ESPNcricinfo, 10 October 2021

Isaiah Rajah (born 16 October 1993) is a Trinidadian cricketer. He made his first-class debut for Trinidad and Tobago in the 2016–17 Regional Four Day Competition on 25 November 2016. He made his List A debut for Trinidad and Tobago in the 2017–18 Regional Super50 on 11 February 2018. In November 2019, he was named in Trinidad and Tobago's squad for the 2019–20 Regional Super50 tournament.

In June 2020, he was selected by Trinidad and Tobago, in the players' draft hosted by Cricket West Indies ahead of the 2020–21 domestic season.
