= Elvin Berridge =

Kittitian cricketer (born 1989)

Personal information
- Born: 11 February 1989 (age 37); Saint Kitts

Domestic team information
- Years: Team
- 2017-present: Leeward Islands

Career statistics
Competition	First-class	Twenty20
Matches	1	1
Runs scored	0	-
Batting average	0.00	-
100s/50s	0/0	0/0
Top score	0	-
Balls bowled	36	24
Wickets	1	1
Bowling average	26.00	14.00
5 wickets in innings	0	0
10 wickets in match	0	0
Best bowling	1/12	1/14
Catches/stumpings	1/0	0/0
- Source: Cricinfo, 25 April 2017

Elvin Berridge (born 11 February 1989) is a cricketer from Saint Kitts. He made his first-class debut for the Leeward Islands in the 2016–17 Regional Four Day Competition on 21 April 2017.
