= Eon Hooper =

Guyanese cricketer (born 1991)

Personal information
- Full name: Eon Marcel Hooper
- Born: 9 July 1991 (age 35)
- Batting: Right-handed
- Bowling: Right-hand offbreak

Domestic team information
- Years: Team
- 2017: Guyana

Career statistics
Competition	First-class
Matches	1
Runs scored	12
Batting average	12.00
100s/50s	0/0
Top score	12
Balls bowled	114
Wickets	0
Bowling average	–
5 wickets in innings	–
10 wickets in match	–
Best bowling	–
Catches/stumpings	0/–
- Source: ESPNcricinfo, 5 May 2017

Eon Hooper (born 9 July 1991) is a Guyanese cricketer. He made his first-class debut for Guyana in the 2016–17 Regional Four Day Competition on 11 November 2016.
