= Rachid O'Neale =

Barbadian cricketer (born 1991)

Personal information
- Full name: Rachid Edmar Dacosta O'Neale
- Born: 27 July 1991 (age 35)

Domestic team information
- Years: Team
- 2016-present: Barbados

Career statistics
Competition	FC
Matches	1
Runs scored	10
Batting average	10.00
100s/50s	0/0
Top score	9*
Balls bowled	102
Wickets	1
Bowling average	56.00
5 wickets in innings	0
10 wickets in match	0
Best bowling	1/40
Catches/stumpings	0/0
- Source: Cricinfo, 5 May 2017

Rachid O'Neale (born 27 July 1991) is a Barbadian cricketer. He made his first-class debut for Barbados in the 2016–17 Regional Four Day Competition on 7 April 2017.
