= Marlon Richards =

Trinidadian cricketer (born 1989)

Personal information
- Full name: Marlon Kevin Alexander Richards
- Born: 10 January 1989 (age 37); Linden, Guyana
- Batting: Right-handed
- Bowling: Right-arm medium-fast

Domestic team information
- Years: Team
- 2013–present: Trinidad and Tobago

Career statistics
Competition	First-class	List A
Matches	37	9
Runs scored	640	67
Batting average	12.07	16.75
100s/50s	0/2	0/0
Top score	60	31
Balls bowled	4515	360
Wickets	84	12
Bowling average	26.59	17.83
5 wickets in innings	1	1
10 wickets in match	0	0
Best bowling	5/46	5/36
Catches/stumpings	20/0	2/0
- Source: CricketArchive, 9 June 2017

Marlon Kevin Alexander Richards (born 10 January 1989) is a Guyanese-born Trinidadian cricketer who plays for the Trinidad and Tobago national team in West Indian domestic cricket. He is a right-handed batsman and right-arm medium-fast bowler.

Richards was born in Guyana, eventually moving with his family to Trinidad at the age of 12. He made his first-class debut for Trinidad and Tobago during the 2012–13 Regional Four Day Competition, and in the tournament semi-final against Jamaica took a maiden five-wicket haul, 5/46. In the 2014–15 Regional Four Day Competition, Richards took 27 wickets, with only Imran Khan taking more among his teammates.
