= Windward Park =

Cricket ground in Lucas Street, Barbados

Ground information
- Location: Lucas Street, Barbados
- Coordinates: 13.1276°N 59.4586°W
- Establishment: c. 1973

International information
- First WODI: 27 April 2012: West Indies v Sri Lanka
- Last WODI: 29 April 2012: West Indies v Sri Lanka

Team information
Barbados	(2000–2017/18)
- As of 23 April 2022; Source: Ground profile

Windward Park is a cricket ground in Lucas Street, Barbados.

== History ==
Located in the village of Lucas Street, the ground is the home venue for Windward Cricket Club, which was founded in the 1890s to cater for rural White Barbadians. For many years the club played at Codrington College, before moving to Windward Park. The ground first played host to representative cricket when Barbados played a touring South Africa A side in a first-class match in 2000. Between 2000 and 2014, the ground played host to six first-class matches, all featuring Barbados with the exception of the 2014 fixture, which saw the Sagicor High Performance Centre play a touring Bangladesh A team. Seventeen List A one-day matches have also been played at the ground between 2004 and 2018, the vast majority of which were in the Regional Super50; West Indies A played two one-day matches there in 2005 against a touring England A team. Windward Park also played host to women's cricket, with two Women's One Day Internationals being played there between West Indies women and Sri Lanka women in April 2012.

== Records ==
=== First-class ===
- Highest team total: 495 for 8 by Barbados v Guyana, 2008–09
- Lowest team total: 116 all out by Barbados v Jamaica, 2004–05
- Highest individual innings: 164 by Kraigg Brathwaite for Sagicor High Performance Centre v Bangladesh A, 2014
- Best bowling in an innings: 6-46 by Jason Bennett for Barbados v Jamaica, 2004–05
- Best bowling in a match: 10-82 by Jason Bennett, as above

=== List A ===
- Highest team total: 291 for 5 (50 overs) by Guyana v Leeward Islands, 2005–06
- Lowest team total: 71 all out (32.2 overs) by Combined Campuses and Colleges v Barbados, 2005–06
- Highest individual innings: 113 by Ramnaresh Sarwan for Guyana v Leeward Islands, 2005–06
- Best bowling in an innings: 6-28 by Andre Russell for Sagicor High Performance Centre v Bangladesh A, 2014

== See also ==
- List of cricket grounds in the West Indies
