= Tyrone Theophile =

Dominican cricketer (born 1989)

Personal information
- Born: 12 August 1989 (age 37); Dominica
- Batting: Right-handed
- Bowling: Right-arm off-break
- Role: Wicket-keeper

Domestic team information
- Years: Team
- 2009/10–2018/19: Windward Islands

Career statistics
| Competition | First-class | List A |
|---|---|---|
| Matches | 68 | 34 |
| Runs scored | 3,055 | 605 |
| Batting average | 25.88 | 18.90 |
| 100s/50s | 3/13 | 1/0 |
| Top score | 160* | 107 |
| Balls bowled | 1,251 | 156 |
| Wickets | 18 | 4 |
| Bowling average | 34.00 | 36.75 |
| 5 wickets in innings | 1 | 0 |
| 10 wickets in match | 0 | 0 |
| Best bowling | 5/56 | 3/33 |
| Catches/stumpings | 82/0 | 11/0 |
- Source: CricInfo, 15 August 2024

Tyrone Theophile (born 12 August 1989) is a Dominican former cricketer who played for the Windward Islands in West Indian domestic cricket. He plays as a right-handed opening batsman, and occasionally keeps wicket for the team.

A former Windwards under-19s player, Theophile made his senior debut for the team during the 2009–10 Regional Four Day Competition. He did not make his maiden first-class half-century until the 2012–13 season, when he hit 54 against the Combined Campuses and Colleges. Theophile finished the 2014–15 season with 689 runs from his ten matches, placing him behind only his teammate Devon Smith for runs scored in the competition. His season included two centuries – 125 against Barbados and 136 against Trinidad and Tobago.

In February 2018, he scored his first century in List A cricket, batting for the Windward Islands against Guyana, in the semi-final of the 2017–18 Regional Super50 tournament.
