= Jon-Ross Campbell =

West Indian cricketer (born 1990)

Personal information
- Full name: Jon-Ross Charles Campbell
- Born: 9 July 1990 (age 36); Kingston, Jamaica
- Batting: Right-handed
- Bowling: Right-arm off-break
- Role: Batsman

Domestic team information
- Years: Team
- Jamaica
- Source: ESPNCricInfo, 18 December 2017

Jon-Ross Charles Campbell (born 9 July 1990) is a West Indian first-class and T20 cricketer.

== Domestic career ==
He made his debut for Jamaica in February 2010 in West Indies' Regional Four Day Competition. He has played seven first class matches till date, and he played his FC match in March 2015. In April 2010, he made his T20 debut and has played two T20 matches till date. In June 2021, he was selected to take part in the Minor League Cricket tournament in the United States following the players' draft.
