= Sachin Mylavarapu =

Singaporean cricketer

Personal information
- Full name: Sachin Venkata Srikar Mylavarapu
- Born: 21 June 1991 (age 35); Singapore
- Height: 1.76 m (5 ft 9 in)
- Batting: Right-handed
- Bowling: Slow left-arm orthodox
- Role: Bowler

Domestic team information
- Years: Team
- 2013–2015: Oxford University

Career statistics
Competition	FC
Matches	2
Runs scored	4
Batting average	2.00
100s/50s	0/0
Top score	4
Balls bowled	463
Wickets	9
Bowling average	23.22
5 wickets in innings	1
10 wickets in match	0
Best bowling	5/23
Catches/stumpings	1/–
- Source: CricketArchive, 20 July 2015

Sachin Venkata Srikar Mylavarapu (born 21 June 1991) is a Singaporean cricketer who has played at first-class level for Oxford University, making his debut during the 2013 season.

A left-arm orthodox spinner who bats with the opposite hand, Mylavarapu was part of a Singaporean team that placed sixth at the ACC Under-15 Cup in mid-2006. Despite being only 16, he was included in the Singaporean under-19 team for the 2007 ACC Under-19 Elite Cup the following year, and played four matches, with a best of 2/30 against the United Arab Emirates. He remained eligible for the team at the 2009 edition of the same tournament, but took only three wickets from five matches. Mylavarapu was selected in Singapore's 15-man squad for the 2011 Stan Nagaiah Trophy against Malaysia, but did not play any of the matches. He did, however, play in the Carl Schubert Trophy (the under-23 equivalent) in 2013, and was consequently selected as a standby player for Singapore at the 2013 ACC Emerging Teams Cup.

Having played for his school in Singapore, the Raffles Institution, Mylavarapu continued his involvement in cricket after leaving to study in England, breaking into the senior Oxford University side during the 2012 season. After good form during the 2013 season, including strong performances in a three-day game against the MCC and a five-wicket haul against the Free Foresters, he was included in Oxford's side for the annual University Match against Cambridge University. In the match, which held first-class status, Mylavarapu took a five-wicket haul, 5/23 from 19.2 overs, in Cambridge's first innings, and finished with eight wickets for the match. His achievement was overshadowed by that of his captain, Sam Agarwal, who scored the first triple century in the fixture's history. Mylavarapu played further fixtures for Oxford in both the 2014 and 2015 seasons, including another first-class game against Cambridge in 2015, where he had less success. He is one of two Singaporeans to have played first-class matches for an English university in recent years, the other being Durham University's Anish Paraam.

In June 2021, he was selected to participate in the Minor League Cricket tournament in the United States following the players' draft.
