= Jamal Smith =

Barbadian cricketer (born 1984)

Personal information
- Born: 16 October 1984 (age 42); Barbados
- Batting: Right-handed
- Bowling: Right-arm off spin
- Role: Wicket-keeper

Domestic team information
- Years: Team
- 2008–: Combined Campuses and Colleges
- FC debut: 18 January 2008 Combined Campuses and Colleges v Barbados
- LA debut: 20 October 2011 Combined Campuses and Colleges v Trinidad and Tobago

Career statistics
Competition	FC	LA
Matches	13	11
Runs scored	261	187
Batting average	11.86	23.37
100s/50s	0/1	0/0
Top score	56	42
Balls bowled	60	n/a
Wickets	1	n/a
Bowling average	42.00	n/a
5 wickets in innings	0	n/a
10 wickets in match	0	n/a
Best bowling	1/13	n/a
Catches/stumpings	19/1	9/1
- Source: ESPNcricinfo, 13 February 2017

Jamal Smith (born 16 October 1984) is a Barbadian cricketer. He made his first-class debut for the Combined Campuses and Colleges in the 2007–08 Carib Beer Series on 18 January 2008.
