= Yannick Leonard =

Guyanese cricketer (born 1991)

Personal information
- Born: 12 May 1991 (age 35); Guyana
- Source: Cricinfo, 24 November 2020

Yannick Leonard (born 12 May 1991) is a Guyanese cricketer. He played in eight first-class and two List A matches for the Leeward Islands from 2013 to 2019.

== See also ==
- List of Leeward Islands first-class cricketers
