= Verdayne Smith =

Cricket umpire

Personal information
- Born: 30 September 1977 (age 49); Manchester, Jamaica
- Role: Umpire

Umpiring information
- WODIs umpired: 5 (2013–2021)
- WT20Is umpired: 3 (2019–2021)
- Source: Cricinfo, 11 March 2017

Verdayne Smith (born 30 September 1977) is a Jamaican cricket umpire. He has stood in matches in the 2016–17 Regional Four Day Competition and the 2016–17 Regional Super50.
