= Steven Jacobs (cricketer) =

Guyanese cricketer

Personal information
- Full name: Steven Anthony Jacobs
- Born: 13 September 1988 (age 38); Georgetown, Guyana
- Batting: Right-handed
- Bowling: Right-arm off spin
- Role: All-rounder

Domestic team information
- Years: Team
- 2006–present: Guyana
- 2013–2017: Guyana Amazon Warriors (squad no. 13)
- 2018-2019: Jamaica Tallawahs

Career statistics
Competition	FC	LA	T20
Matches	26	38	38
Runs scored	755	368	164
Batting average	17.97	14.15	16.40
100s/50s	0/5	0/1	0/0
Top score	75	54*	36
Balls bowled	3,602	1,858	709
Wickets	54	38	23
Bowling average	28.64	26.36	34.39
5 wickets in innings	0	0	0
10 wickets in match	0	0	0
Best bowling	4/35	4/21	2/12
Catches/stumpings	18/0	18/0	12/0
- Source: , 3 September 2017

Steven Anthony Jacobs (born 13 September 1988) is a Guyanese cricketer who plays for the Guyanese national side in West Indian domestic cricket, as well as representing the Guyana Amazon Warriors franchise in the Caribbean Premier League (CPL). He is an all-rounder who bats right-handed and bowls off spin.

Jacobs was born in Georgetown, the capital of Guyana. He played for the West Indies under-19s at the 2008 Under-19 World Cup in Malaysia, as vice-captain to Shamarh Brooks. At the tournament, Jacobs won two man of the match awards – against Papua New Guinea he scored 101 from 86 balls, while against Ireland he took 3/18 and made 40 not out. He had already made his first-class debut before appearing in the World Cup, playing two matches for Guyana in the 2005–06 Carib Beer Cup, aged 17.

During the 2008–09 season, Jacobs played regularly himself in Guyana's four-day and one-day teams, scoring maiden half-centuries in both forms of the game. However, he fell out of the form the following season, and did not regain a regular position until the 2012–13 season. In the 2012–13 Regional Four Day Competition, Jacobs scored 245 runs, placing him behind only Leon Johnson and Assad Fudadin for Guyana, and also took 17 wickets, behind only Veerasammy Permaul and Devendra Bishoo amongst his teammates. He signed with the Amazon Warriors for the inaugural 2013 Caribbean Premier League season, but has only made sporadic appearances for the team.

On 3 June 2018, he was selected to play for the Vancouver Knights in the players' draft for the inaugural edition of the Global T20 Canada tournament.
