= Roshon Primus =

Barbadian cricketer (born 1995)

Personal information
- Born: 14 August 1995 (age 31); Bridgetown, Barbados
- Batting: Right-handed
- Bowling: Right-hand medium
- Role: All-rounder

Domestic team information
- Years: Team
- 2016/17–2017/18: Trinidad and Tobago
- 2017–2018: Guyana Amazon Warriors (squad no. 69)
- 2019: Barbados Tridents
- 2019/20–2023/24: Barbados
- 2022–2023: Saint Lucia Kings
- 2023/24: Combined Campuses and Colleges
- 2024: Antigua & Barbuda Falcons

Career statistics
Competition	FC	LA	T20
Matches	21	29	44
Runs scored	710	408	426
Batting average	22.90	22.66	20.28
100s/50s	0/4	1/1	0/0
Top score	65	130*	38
Balls bowled	1,824	914	401
Wickets	42	30	25
Bowling average	22.90	30.66	24.20
5 wickets in innings	2	0	0
10 wickets in match	0	0	0
Best bowling	6/30	4/47	2/11
Catches/stumpings	19/0	17/0	12/0
- Source: Cricinfo, 8 July 2026

Roshon Primus (born 14 August 1995) is a Barbadian cricketer. He made his first-class debut for Trinidad and Tobago in the 2016–17 Regional Four Day Competition on 11 November 2016. On debut he took match figures of 7 wickets for 68 runs, which included figures of 6 wickets for 30 runs in the first innings, giving Trinidad and Tobago a nine-wicket win.

He made his List A debut for Trinidad and Tobago in the 2016–17 Regional Super50 on 27 January 2017. He made his Twenty20 debut for Guyana Amazon Warriors in the 2017 Caribbean Premier League on 11 August 2017. In October 2019, he was selected to play for Barbados in the 2019–20 Regional Super50 tournament.
