= Leon Johnson (cricketer) =

West Indian cricketer

Personal information
- Full name: Leon Rayon Johnson
- Born: 8 August 1987 (age 39); Georgetown, Guyana
- Height: 6 ft 2 in (1.88 m)
- Batting: Left-handed
- Bowling: Slow left-arm orthodox
- Role: Middle-order Batsman

International information
- National side: West Indies
- Test debut (cap 300): 13 September 2014 v Bangladesh
- Last Test: 3 November 2016 v Pakistan
- ODI debut (cap 142): 20 August 2008 v Bermuda
- Last ODI: 25 January 2015 v South Africa
- ODI shirt no.: 23

Domestic team information
- Years: Team
- 2004–: Guyana (squad no. 23)
- 2013–: Guyana Amazon Warriors (squad no. 23)

Career statistics
Competition	Test	ODI	FC	LA
Matches	9	6	127	88
Runs scored	403	98	6741	2040
Batting average	25.18	16.33	32.56	25.82
100s/50s	0/2	0/1	7/42	2/14
Top score	66	51	189*	102*
Balls bowled	24	–	727	89
Wickets	0	–	8	0
Bowling average	–	–	54.00	–
5 wickets in innings	–	–	0	–
10 wickets in match	–	–	0	–
Best bowling	–	–	2/18	–
Catches/stumpings	7/0	2/0	166/0	46/0
- Source: ESPNcricinfo, 16 January 2024

Leon Rayon Johnson (born 8 August 1987), is a Guyanese born cricketer who plays as a right handed middle order batsman. He has featured for the West Indies, Guyana and Guyana Amazon Warriors in his career. Captaining both the West Indies at youth level and Guyana, Johnson is tied with Tamar Lambert of Jamaica as the most successful captain in West Indian first class cricket tournaments.

== Domestic career ==
Johnson made his first class debut for Guyana in the 2003/04 season when he played in two first class matches, scoring just four runs from 3 innings. He did not feature in Guyana's first-class team for the next three seasons. He made his list A debut in the 2007/08 season.

In the 2007/08 domestic season, Johnson scored 427 runs at an average of 42.70 from 6 matches for Guyana in the Carib Beer Series. He fell six runs short of his maiden first-class century on 7 March 2008 when he edged a wide delivery from off-spinner Shirley Clarke against Combined Campuses and Colleges. The innings was his highest score of the season.

Johnson was the leading run-scorer in the 2015–16 Regional Four Day Competition, scoring 807 runs from ten matches.

In October 2018, in the first semi-final match of the 2018–19 Regional Super50, Johnson scored his first century in List A cricket, helping Guyana to beat Jamaica by one wicket and progress to the final. In October 2019, he was named as the captain of Guyana's squad for the 2019–20 Regional Super50 tournament. In February 2020, in the 2019–20 West Indies Championship, Johnson scored his 6,000 run in first-class cricket.

== International career ==
Before representing the West Indies at senior level, Johnson was part of the West Indies under-19 team and played in seven youth One Day Internationals. he scored 30 runs at an average of 30.00 with a high score of 29* and took nine wickets at 27.44 with his slow bowling with best bowling figures of 3/24. Johnson captained the under-19 side at the 2006 under-19 World Cup; amongst his performances was an innings of 83 against South Africa to help his team secure a place in the next round of the competition.

Consistent performances in the Carib Beer Series led to Johnson's selection for the tri-series involving Bermuda and Canada. He made his international debut – along with Brendan Nash and Kemar Roach – in a One Day International match against Bermuda. Johnson scored 27 runs off 28 balls before being caught out off the spin bowling of Delyone Borden as the West Indies won by six wickets. Johnson scored his first ODI half century on 22 August 2008. He scored 51 off 77 balls in a 128-run stand with Xavier Marshall who in the same innings broke the record for number of sixes hit in an ODI as West Indies beat Canada by 49 runs. In the final against Canada, Johnson was out to debutant Balaji Rao for one run from nine balls as the West Indies won by seven wickets.

In November 2008, the ODI squad to tour Pakistan was announced, with Johnson as one of the members. John Dyson, the West Indies coach, stated that Johnson's performance against Canada and Bermuda had shown he was ready to perform against leading cricket teams such as Pakistan. On the same day, it was announced that Johnson was one of four players – along with Lionel Baker, Brendan Nash, and Kemar Roach – without a Test cap to be named in the 15-man squad selected to tour New Zealand for a Test series. However, Johnson did not play in the series.

He made his Test debut in September 2014 against Bangladesh at Beausejour Stadium in Gros Islet where he scored 66 in the first innings and then 41 runs in second.

== Personal life ==
He is a married father of three children. Johnson along with fellow cricketer Steven Jacobs, also owns a construction company by the name of First Change Builders Inc.
