= 2009–10 Regional Four Day Competition =

Cricket tournament

- Administrator(s): West Indies Cricket Board
- Cricket format: First-class cricket (4 days)
- Champions: Jamaica (10th title)
- Participants: 7
- Matches: 21
- Most runs: 546 – Devon Smith (Windward Islands)
- Most wickets: 41 – Imran Khan (Trinidad and Tobago)

The 2009–10 Regional Four Day Competition was the 44th domestic first-class cricket tournament held in the West Indies, it took place from 8 January 2010 – 1 March 2010. Jamaica won the tournament after finishing top of the table with five wins from their six matches. It was their 3rd tournament win in succession and their 10th overall.

Devon Smith of the Windward Islands finished as the tournament's highest run-scorer, he made 546 runs at an average of 49.63, including two centuries and a highest score of 193. The leading wicket-taker in the competition was Imran Khan of Trinidad and Tobago, he took 41 wickets at an average of 16.39 with best innings figures of 7/71.

== Points table ==
Team	Pld	W	L	T	D	Aban	Pts
Jamaica	6	5	1	0	0	0	60
Barbados	6	4	0	0	2	0	57
Leeward Islands	6	2	3	0	1	0	34
Trinidad and Tobago	6	2	2	0	2	0	33
Combined Campuses and Colleges	6	2	4	0	0	0	24
Guyana	6	1	3	0	2	0	22
Windward Islands	6	1	4	0	1	0	22
Source:Cricinfo

== Points allocation ==
Completed match

- Outright win - 12
- Loser if 1st Innings lead obtained - 4
- Loser if tie on 1st Innings - 3
- Loser if 1st Innings also lost - 0
- Tie - 8

Incomplete Match

- 1st Innings lead - 6
- 1st Innings loss - 3
- Tie on 1st innings - 4

Score Equal in a Drawn Match

- Team batting on the 4th innings - 8
- Team fielding on the 4th innings if that team has lead on 1st inning - 6
- If scores tied on 1st innings - 4
- If team has lost on 1st innings - 3

Abandoned Match

In the event of a match being abandoned without any play having taken place, or in the event of there being no 1st innings decision, three points each.
