= 2015 Caribbean Premier League squads =

This is a list of the squads of the teams that participated in the 2015 Caribbean Premier League.

== Barbados Tridents ==
No.	Player	Nat	Date of birth	Batting	Bowling style
	Kieron Pollard (c)	(Trinidad and Tobago)	12 May 1987 (aged 28)	Right	Right-arm medium
	Shai Hope (wk)	(Barbados)	10 November 1993 (aged 21)	Right
	Shoaib Malik	(Pakistan)	1 February 1982 (aged 33)	Right	Right-arm off break
	Dwayne Smith	(Barbados)	12 April 1983 (aged 32)	Right	Right-arm medium
	Ravi Rampaul	(Trinidad and Tobago)	15 October 1984 (aged 30)	Left	Right-arm fast-medium
	Jonathan Carter	(Barbados)	16 November 1987 (aged 27)	Left	Right-arm medium
	Jason Holder	(Barbados)	5 November 1991 (aged 23)	Right	Right-arm medium-fast
	Ashley Nurse	(Barbados)	22 December 1988 (aged 26)	Right	Right-arm off break
	Rayad Emrit	(Trinidad and Tobago)	8 March 1981 (aged 34)	Right	Right-arm medium-fast
	Akeal Hosein	(Trinidad and Tobago)	23 April 1993 (aged 22)	Left	Slow left-arm orthodox
	Navin Stewart	(Trinidad and Tobago)	13 June 1983 (aged 32)	Right	Right-arm fast-medium
	Dilshan Munaweera	(Sri Lanka)	13 June 1983 (aged 32)	Right	Right-arm off break
	Kyle Corbin	(Barbados)	15 May 1990 (aged 25)	Right
	Justin Ontong	(South Africa)	4 January 1980 (aged 34)	Right	Right-arm off break
	Robin Peterson	(South Africa)	4 August 1979 (aged 34)	Left	Slow left-arm orthodox
	Jeevan Mendis	(Sri Lanka)	15 January 1983 (aged 31)	Right	Right-arm Leg break
	Steven Taylor	(United States)	9 November 1993 (aged 20)	Left	Right-arm off break
	Imran Khan	(Trinidad and Tobago)	6 July 1984 (aged 30)	Right	Right-arm Leg break
	Misbah-ul-Haq	(Pakistan)	28 May 1974 (aged 40)	Right	Right-arm Leg break

Sources: CPLT20 official site and Cricinfo

== Guyana Amazon Warriors ==
No.	Player	Nat	Date of birth	Batting	Bowling style
	Sunil Narine (c)	(Trinidad and Tobago)	26 May 1988 (aged 27)	Right	Right-arm off break
	Denesh Ramdin (wk)	(Trinidad and Tobago)	13 March 1985 (aged 30)	Right
	Lendl Simmons	(Trinidad and Tobago)	25 January 1985 (aged 30)	Right	Right-arm medium
	Trevon Griffith	(Guyana)	18 April 1991 (aged 24)	Left	Right-arm off break
	Veerasammy Permaul	(Guyana)	11 August 1989 (aged 25)	Right	Slow left-arm orthodox
	Ronsford Beaton	(Guyana)	17 September 1992 (aged 22)	Right	Right-arm fast-medium
	Christopher Barnwell	(Guyana)	6 January 1987 (aged 28)	Right	Right-arm medium-fast
	Lasith Malinga	(Sri Lanka)	28 August 1983 (aged 31)	Right	Right-arm Fast
	Tillakaratne Dilshan	(Sri Lanka)	14 October 1976 (aged 38)	Right	Right-arm off break
	Shivnarine Chanderpaul	(Guyana)	16 August 1974 (aged 40)	Left	Leg break
	Thisara Perera	(Sri Lanka)	3 April 1989 (aged 26)	Left	Right-arm medium-fast
	Paul Wintz	(Guyana)	7 March 1986 (aged 29)	Right	Right-arm medium-fast
	Devendra Bishoo	(Guyana)	6 November 1985 (aged 29)	Left	Leg break
	Brad Hodge	(Australia)	29 December 1974 (aged 40)	Right	Right-arm medium-fast
	Marchant de Lange	(South Africa)	13 October 1990 (aged 24)	Right	Right-arm Fast
	Assad Fudadin	(Guyana)	1 August 1985 (aged 29)	Left	Right-arm medium-fast
	Shimron Hetmyer	(Guyana)	26 December 1996 (aged 18)	Left	Right-arm Leg break
	Umar Akmal (wk)	(Pakistan)	26 May 1990 (aged 25)	Right	Right-arm Off spin
	David Wiese	(South Africa)	18 May 1985 (aged 30)	Right	Right-arm medium-fast

Sources: CPLT20 Official site and Cricinfo

== Jamaica Tallawahs ==
No.	Player	Nat	Date of birth	Batting	Bowling style
	Chris Gayle (c)	(Jamaica)	21 September 1979 (aged 35)	Left	Right-arm off break
	Andre Russell	(Jamaica)	29 April 1988 (aged 27)	Right	Right-arm fast
	Daniel Vettori	(New Zealand)	27 January 1979 (aged 36)	Left	Slow left-arm orthodox
	Jerome Taylor	(Jamaica)	22 June 1984 (aged 31)	Right	Right-arm fast
	David Bernard	(Jamaica)	19 July 1981 (aged 33)	Right	Right-arm medium-fast
	Chadwick Walton (wk)	(Jamaica)	3 July 1985 (aged 30)	Right
	Jermaine Blackwood	(Jamaica)	20 November 1991 (aged 23)	Right	Right-arm off break
	Rusty Theron	(South Africa)	24 June 1985 (aged 30)	Right	Right-arm medium-fast
	Nikita Miller	(Jamaica)	16 May 1982 (aged 33)	Right	Slow left-arm orthodox
	Nkrumah Bonner	(Jamaica)	23 January 1989 (aged 26)	Right	Leg break
	Krishmar Santokie	(Jamaica)	20 December 1984 (aged 30)	Left	Left-arm medium-fast
	Mahela Jayawardene	(Sri Lanka)	27 May 1977 (aged 38)	Right	Right-arm medium-fast
	Narsingh Deonarine	(Guyana)	16 August 1983 (aged 30)	Left	Right-arm off break
	Ramaal Lewis	(Jamaica)	18 August 1996 (aged 17)	Right	Right-arm off break
	Chris Lynn	(Australia)	10 April 1990 (aged 24)	Right	Slow left-arm orthodox
	Horace Miller (wk)	(Jamaica)	26 October 1989 (aged 24)	Right

Sources: CPLT20 Official site and Cricinfo

== St Kitts and Nevis Patriots ==
No.	Player	Nat	Date of birth	Batting	Bowling style
	Marlon Samuels (c)	(Jamaica)	5 February 1981 (aged 34)	Right	Right-arm off break
	Shahid Afridi	(Pakistan)	1 March 1980 (aged 35)	Right	Right-arm leg spin
	Sohail Tanvir	(Pakistan)	12 December 1984 (aged 30)	Left	Left-arm medium-fast
	Sheldon Cottrell	(Jamaica)	19 August 1989 (aged 25)	Right	Left-arm medium-fast
	Martin Guptill	(New Zealand)	30 September 1986 (aged 28)	Right	Right-arm off break
	Carlos Brathwaite	(Barbados)	18 July 1988 (aged 26)	Right	Right-arm medium-fast
	Evin Lewis	(Trinidad and Tobago)	27 December 1991 (aged 23)	Left
	Devon Thomas (wk)	(Antigua and Barbuda)	12 November 1989 (aged 25)	Right	Right-arm medium
	Jacques Taylor	(Saint Kitts and Nevis)	19 April 1988 (aged 27)	Right	Right-arm Fast
	Justin Athanaze	(Antigua and Barbuda)	29 January 1988 (aged 27)	Right	Right-arm off break
	Raymon Reifer	(Barbados)	11 May 1991 (aged 24)	Left	Left-arm medium
	Orlando Peters	(Antigua and Barbuda)	10 May 1988 (aged 27)	Right	Right-arm medium
	Nicholas Pooran (wk)	(Trinidad and Tobago)	2 October 1995 (aged 19)	Left
	Tonito Willett	(Nevis)	6 February 1983 (aged 32)	Right	Right-arm medium
	Tabraiz Shamsi	(South Africa)	18 February 1990 (aged 25)	Right	Slow left-arm wrist-spin
	Shane Dowrich (wk)	(Barbados)	30 October 1991 (aged 23)	Right
	Nikhil Dutta	(Canada)	13 October 1994 (aged 20)	Right	Right-arm off break
	Jomel Warrican	🇧🇧	20 October 1992 (aged 22)	Left	Slow left-arm orthodox

Sources: CPLT20 Official site and Cricinfo

== St Lucia Stars ==
No.	Player	Nat	Date of birth	Batting	Bowling style
	Darren Sammy (c) (Note: ruled out of CPL) (Note: Darren Sammy ruled out from CPL 2015 after he fractured his left hand while batting in the match against Jamaica Tallawahs .)	(Saint Lucia)	20 December 1983 (aged 31)	Right	Right-arm medium-fast
	Johnson Charles (wk)	(Saint Lucia)	14 January 1989 (aged 26)	Right
	Andre Fletcher (wk)	(Grenada)	28 November 1987 (aged 27)	Right
	Shane Shillingford	(Dominica)	22 February 1983 (aged 32)	Right	Right-arm off break
	Keddy Lesporis	(Saint Lucia)	27 December 1988 (aged 26)	Right	Right-arm off break
	Liam Sebastien	(Dominica)	9 September 1984 (aged 30)	Left	Right-arm off break
	Kevin Pietersen (c) (Note: Kevin Pietersen will replace Darren Sammy as Zouks captain. .)	(England)	27 June 1980 (aged 35)	Right	Right-arm off break
	Ross Taylor	(New Zealand)	8 March 1984 (aged 31)	Right	Right-arm off break
	Shannon Gabriel	(Trinidad and Tobago)	28 April 1988 (aged 27)	Right	Right-arm fast-medium
	Fidel Edwards	(Barbados)	6 February 1982 (aged 33)	Right	Right-arm fast
	Delorn Johnson	(Saint Vincent and the Grenadines)	15 September 1988 (aged 26)	Left	Left-arm fast
	Kyle Mayers	(Barbados)	8 September 1992 (aged 22)	Left	Right-arm medium
	Henry Davids	(South Africa)	19 January 1980 (aged 35)	Right	Right-arm medium-fast
	Kemar Roach	(Barbados)	30 June 1988 (aged 27)	Right	Right-arm Fast bowling
	Eddie Leie	(South Africa)	16 November 1986 (aged 28)	Right	Leg break
	Keron Cottoy (Note: replaced for Darren Sammy) (Note: Keron Cottoy, who has played just three T20s, has been called up to the squad as a replacement for Darren Sammy. .)	(Saint Vincent and the Grenadines)	14 November 1989 (aged 25)	Left	Leg break
	Nathan McCullum	(New Zealand)	1 September 1980 (aged 34)	Right	Right-arm Off break
	Gidron Pope	(Saint Vincent and the Grenadines)	24 November 1996 (aged 18)	Right	Right-arm Off break
	Shakib Al Hasan	(Bangladesh)	24 March 1987 (aged 28)	Left	Slow left-arm orthodox

Sources: CPLT20 Official site and Cricinfo

== Trinbago Knight Riders ==
No.	Player	Nat	Date of birth	Batting	Bowling style
	Dwayne Bravo (c)	(Trinidad and Tobago)	7 October 1983 (aged 31)	Right	Right-arm medium-fast
	Samuel Badree	(Trinidad and Tobago)	9 March 1981 (aged 34)	Right	Leg break
	Sulieman Benn	(Barbados)	22 July 1981 (aged 33)	Left	Slow left-arm orthodox
	Darren Bravo	(Trinidad and Tobago)	6 February 1989 (aged 26)	Left	Right-arm medium-fast
	Kevon Cooper	(Trinidad and Tobago)	16 February 1989 (aged 26)	Right	Right-arm medium
	Jason Mohammed	(Trinidad and Tobago)	23 September 1986 (aged 28)	Right	Right-arm off break
	Jacques Kallis	(South Africa)	16 October 1975 (aged 38)	Right	Right-arm medium-fast
	Johan Botha	(South Africa)	2 May 1982 (aged 32)	Right	Right-arm off break
	Jason Mohammed	(Trinidad and Tobago)	23 September 1986 (aged 27)	Right	Right-arm off break
	Miguel Cummins	(Barbados)	5 September 1990 (aged 24)	Left	Right-arm fast
	Marlon Richards	(Trinidad and Tobago)	10 January 1989 (aged 26)	Right	Right-arm medium-fast
	Kamran Akmal (wk)	(Pakistan)	13 January 1982 (aged 33)	Left
	Javon Searles	(Barbados)	12 December 1986 (aged 28)	Right	Right-arm medium-fast
	Cameron Delport	(South Africa)	12 May 1989 (aged 26)	Left	Right-arm medium-fast
	Derone Davis	(Barbados)	14 October 1992 (aged 22)	Left	Slow left-arm orthodox
	William Perkins (wk)	(Barbados)	8 October 1986 (aged 28)	Right
	Mark Deyal	(Trinidad and Tobago)	7 April 1993 (aged 22)	Left	Right-arm Off break

Sources: CPLT20 Official site and Cricinfo

== Notes and references ==
Notes
