= 2011–12 Regional Super50 =

Cricket tournament

- Dates: 19 – 29 October 2011
- Administrator: WICB
- Cricket format: List A (50 overs)
- Tournament format(s): Group stage, finals
- Host: Guyana
- Champions: Jamaica (8th title)
- Participants: 8
- Matches: 15
- Most runs: (Trinidad and Tobago) Jason Mohammed (227)
- Most wickets: (Trinidad and Tobago) Sunil Narine (15)

The 2011–12 Regional Super50 was the 38th season of the Regional Super50, the domestic limited-overs cricket competition for the countries of the West Indies Cricket Board (WICB). All matches in the competition, which was the first edition to be branded as the Regional Super50, were held in Guyana.

Eight teams contested the competition – the six regular teams of West Indian domestic cricket (Barbados, Guyana, Jamaica, the Leeward Islands, Trinidad and Tobago, and the Windward Islands), and two development teams (Combined Campuses and Colleges and the Sagicor High Performance Centre). In the tournament final, played at Guyana National Stadium, Jamaica defeated Trinidad and Tobago by five wickets to win an eighth domestic one-day title. The two joint winners from the previous season, Barbados and the Leewards, both failed to win a game. Two Trinidadians, Jason Mohammed and Sunil Narine, led the tournament in runs and wickets, respectively.

== Squads ==
Barbados	(Cricket West Indies) Combined Campuses	Guyana	Jamaica
Kenroy Williams (c); Sulieman Benn; Tino Best; Rashidi Boucher; Carlos Brathwaite; Patrick Browne; Jonathan Carter; Ryan Hinds; Kyle Hope; Ashley Nurse; Dale Richards; Javon Searles; Dwayne Smith; Kevin Stoute	Romel Currency (c); Nicholas Alexis; Ryan Austin; Miles Bascombe; Jason Dawes; Akeem Dewar; Kavesh Kantasingh; Kyle Mayers; Gilford Moore; Nekoli Parris; Floyd Reifer; Jamal Smith; Ryan Wiggins	Assad Fudadin (c); Christopher Barnwell; Ronsford Beaton; Sewnarine Chattergoon; Derwin Christian; Royston Crandon; Jonathan Foo; Trevon Griffith; Steven Jacobs; Leon Johnson; Amir Khan; Ramnaresh Sarwan; Paul Wintz	Chris Gayle (c); Jermaine Blackwood; Odean Brown; Yannick Elliott; Shawn Findlay; Simon Jackson; Tamar Lambert; Kennar Lewis; Xavier Marshall; Nikita Miller; Andrew Richardson; Krishmar Santokie; Jerome Taylor; Chadwick Walton
Leeward Islands	(Cricket West Indies) Sagicor HPC	Trinidad and Tobago	Windward Islands
Wilden Cornwall (c); Justin Athanaze; Lionel Baker; Omari Banks; Jahmar Hamilton; Montcin Hodge; Chesney Hughes; Javier Liburd; Steve Liburd; Anthony Martin; Jacques Taylor; Gavin Tonge; Calvin Williams; Gavin Williams	Shamarh Brooks (c); Brandon Bess; Nkruma Bonner; Rajendra Chandrika; Kyle Corbin; Keron Cottoy; Andre Creary; Shane Dowrich; Shannon Gabriel; Jason Holder; Delorn Johnson; Kevin McClean; Veerasammy Permaul; Kieran Powell; Devon Thomas	Daren Ganga (c); Samuel Badree; Dwayne Bravo; Kevon Cooper; Sherwin Ganga; Justin Guillen; Imran Khan; Steven Katwaroo; Evin Lewis*; Dave Mohammed; Jason Mohammed; Sunil Narine; William Perkins; Kieron Pollard*	Devon Smith (c); Johnson Charles; Craig Emmanuel; Andre Fletcher; Xavier Gabriel; Dennis George; Kevin James; Keddy Lesporis; Garey Mathurin; Nelon Pascal; Kenroy Peters; Dalton Polius; Liam Sebastien; Hyron Shallow

- Note: Trinidad and Tobago's Kieron Pollard injured his shoulder in his team's group-stage match against the Leeward Islands, and withdrew from the tournament. He was replaced by Evin Lewis in the squad.

== Group stage ==
=== Group A ===
Team	Pld	W	L	T	NR	A	BP	Pts	NRR
Guyana	3	2	0	0	0	1	2	12	+1.678
(Cricket West Indies) Sagicor HPC	3	1	0	0	1	1	0	8	+0.140
Barbados	3	0	1	0	1	1	–1	3	–0.960
Windward Islands	3	0	2	0	0	1	–3	–1	–1.222

19 October 2011
Scorecard

Sagicor HPC (Cricket West Indies); 100/5 (20 overs)	v	Barbados

No result
Everest Cricket Club, Georgetown

- The match was reduced to 34 overs per side before the start of play.

19 October 2011
Scorecard

Guyana; 192 (50 overs)	v	Windward Islands; 72 (24.5 overs)

Guyana won by 103 runs (D/L)
Guyana National Stadium, Providence
Player of the match: Steven Jacobs (Guy)

- The Windwards' target was 176 runs in 40 overs.

21 October 2011
Scorecard

Barbados	v	Windward Islands

Match abandoned
Everest Cricket Club, Georgetown

21 October 2011
Scorecard

Guyana	v	(Cricket West Indies) Sagicor HPC

Match abandoned
Guyana National Stadium, Providence

23 October 2011
Scorecard

Sagicor HPC (Cricket West Indies); 234/6 (50 overs)	v	Windward Islands; 227 (49.5 overs)

Sagicor HPC won by 7 runs
Everest Cricket Club, Georgetown
Player of the match: Jason Holder (HPC)

23 October 2011
Scorecard

Guyana; 226/9 (50 overs)	v	Barbados; 178 (46 overs)

Guyana won by 48 runs
Blairmont Sports Club, Blairmont
Player of the match: Christopher Barnwell (Guy)

=== Group B ===
Team	Pld	W	L	T	NR	A	BP	Pts	NRR
Jamaica	3	2	1	0	0	0	6	14	+2.178
Trinidad and Tobago	3	2	1	0	0	0	4	12	+1.327
(Cricket West Indies) Combined Campuses	3	2	1	0	0	0	0	8	–0.981
Leeward Islands	3	0	3	0	0	0	–5	–5	–2.867

20 October 2011
Scorecard

Trinidad and Tobago; 173/9 (50 overs)	v	(Cricket West Indies) Combined Campuses; 177/5 (48.4 overs)

Combined Campuses won by 5 wickets
Everest Cricket Club, Georgetown
Player of the match: Kyle Mayers (CCC)

20 October 2011
Scorecard

Leeward Islands; 96 (35 overs)	v	Jamaica; 101/3 (15.4 overs)

Jamaica won by 7 wickets
Guyana National Stadium, Providence
Player of the match: Krishmar Santokie (Jam)

- The Windwards' target was 176 runs in 40 overs.

22 October 2011
Scorecard

Jamaica; 259/3 (37 overs)	v	(Cricket West Indies) Combined Campuses; 125/5 (37 overs)

Jamaica won by 134 runs
Everest Cricket Club, Georgetown
Player of the match: Chris Gayle (Jam)

- The match was reduced to 37 overs per side before the start of play.

22 October 2011
Scorecard

Leeward Islands; 94 (25.3 overs)	v	Trinidad and Tobago; 96/5 (14.3 overs)

Trinidad and Tobago won by 5 wickets
Guyana National Stadium, Providence
Player of the match: Sunil Narine (Tri)

24 October 2011
Scorecard

Leeward Islands; 174 (49 overs)	v	(Cricket West Indies) Combined Campuses; 150/6 (33.1 overs)

Combined Campuses won by 4 wickets (D/L)
Everest Cricket Club, Georgetown
Player of the match: Kavesh Kantasingh (CCC)

- Combined Campuses' target was 148 runs in 34 overs.

24 October 2011
Scorecard

Trinidad and Tobago; 196/8 (50 overs)	v	Jamaica; 154/9 (40 overs)

Trinidad and Tobago won by 36 runs (D/L)
Guyana National Stadium, Providence
Player of the match: Sunil Narine (Tri)

- Jamaica's target was 191 runs in 40 overs.

== Finals ==
=== Semi-finals ===
26 October 2011
Scorecard

Guyana; 200/9 (50 overs)	v	Trinidad and Tobago; 201/6 (46.1 overs)

Trinidad and Tobago won by 4 wickets
Guyana National Stadium, Providence
Player of the match: Jason Mohammed (Tri)

27 October 2011
Scorecard

Sagicor HPC (Cricket West Indies); 176/9 (50 overs)	v	Jamaica; 178/9 (49.5 overs)

Jamaica won by 1 wicket
Guyana National Stadium, Providence
Player of the match: Krishmar Santokie (Jam)

=== Final ===
29 October 2011
Scorecard

Trinidad and Tobago; 118 (46.1 overs)	v	Jamaica; 122/5 (35.5 overs)

Jamaica won by 5 wickets
Guyana National Stadium, Providence
Player of the match: Nikita Miller (Jam)

== Statistics ==
=== Most runs ===
The top five run scorers (total runs) are included in this table.

Player	Team	Runs	Inns	Avg	Highest	100s	50s
Jason Mohammed	Trinidad and Tobago	227	5	56.75	77	0	2
Chris Gayle	Jamaica	218	5	43.60	147	1	0
Leon Johnson	Guyana	147	3	49.00	66	0	2
Tamar Lambert	Jamaica	123	5	123.00	48*	0	0
Justin Guillen	Trinidad and Tobago	104	5	20.80	63	0	1

Source: CricketArchive

=== Most wickets ===
The top five wicket takers are listed in this table, listed by wickets taken and then by bowling average.

Player	Team	Overs	Wkts	Ave	SR	Econ	BBI
Sunil Narine	Trinidad and Tobago	56.5	15	11.86	22.60	3.15	6/48
Nikita Miller	Jamaica	47.0	10	11.30	32.40	2.09	3/19
Odean Brown	Jamaica	29.5	9	17.77	30.11	3.54	2/21
Krishmar Santokie	Jamaica	42.4	9	18.55	30.66	3.63	3/30
Kavesh Kantasingh	(Cricket West Indies) Combined Campuses	26.0	8	10.87	22.50	2.90	6/26

Source: CricketArchive
