= 2015 Caribbean Premier League =

Third season of the Caribbean Premier League

- Dates: 20 June 2015 – 26 July 2015
- Administrator: CPL Limited
- Cricket format: Twenty20
- Tournament format(s): Group stage and knockout
- Champions: Trinidad and Tobago Red Steel (1st title)
- Runners-up: Barbados Tridents
- Participants: 6
- Matches: 33
- Attendance: 289,654 (8,777 per match)
- Player of the series: Dwayne Bravo (Trinidad and Tobago Red Steel)
- Most runs: Chris Gayle (Jamaica Tallawahs) (430 runs)
- Most wickets: Dwayne Bravo (Trinidad and Tobago Red Steel) (28 wickets)
- Official website: cplt20.com

The 2015 Caribbean Premier League or for sponsorship reasons, Hero CPL 2015 was the third season of the Caribbean Premier League, established by the West Indies Cricket Board. It began on 20 June and ended on 26 July.

This season saw the introduction of a new team, the St. Kitts and Nevis Patriots as a replacement for the defunct franchise Antigua Hawksbills. This season also saw Dwayne Bravo establish the record for taking the most number of wickets in a single season, with 28 wickets to his name in 13 matches with one 5-wicket and a couple of 4-wicket hauls.

== Teams and standings ==
Pos	Team	Pld	W	L	NR	Pts	NRR	
1	Barbados Tridents	10	6	4	0	12	0.182	Advanced to the Final
2	Guyana Amazon Warriors	10	5	4	1	11	0.589	Advanced to Semi-final 2
3	Trinbago Knight Riders	10	5	4	1	11	−0.077	Advanced to Semi-final 1
4	Jamaica Tallawahs	10	4	5	1	9	−0.424	Advanced to Semi-final 1
5	St Lucia Stars	10	4	5	1	9	−0.679	
6	St Kitts & Nevis Patriots	10	4	6	0	8	0.228	

== Group stage ==
20 June
18:00 (D/N)
Scorecard

(H) Barbados Tridents; 158/6 (20 overs)	v	Guyana Amazon Warriors; 109 (18 overs)
Kieron Pollard 48 (26); Sunil Narine 2/22 (4 overs)		Brad Hodge 26 (24); Ravi Rampaul 3/16 (3 overs)

Barbados won by 49 runs
Kensington Oval, Bridgetown, Barbados
Umpires: Nigel Duguid (WI) and Peter Nero (WI)
Player of the match: Kieron Pollard (Bar)

- Barbados Tridents won the toss and elected to bat

21 June
16:00
Scorecard

(H) St Lucia Stars; 179/6 (20 overs)	v	Trinbago Knight Riders; 10/0 (0.5 overs)
Andre Fletcher 57 (49); Jacques Kallis 2/31 (4 overs)		Jacques Kallis 10* (5)

No result
Beausejour Stadium, Gros Islet, St Lucia
Umpires: Patrick Gustard (WI) and Joel Wilson (WI)

- Trinidad & Tobago Red Steel won the toss and elected to field
- Match has been called off due to inclement weather.

23 June
18:00 (D/N)
Scorecard

(H) Barbados Tridents; 161/4 (20 overs)	v	Jamaica Tallawahs; 145/9 (20 overs)
Dwayne Smith 56 (53); Rusty Theron 1/19 (4 overs)		Chris Lynn 37 (23); Robin Peterson 3/26 (4 overs)

Barbados won by 16 runs
Kensington Oval, Bridgetown, Barbados
Umpires: Nigel Duguid (WI) and Mick Martell (Aus)
Player of the match: Robin Peterson (Bar)

- Barbados Tridents won the toss and elected to bat

24 June
18:00 (D/N)
Scorecard

St Kitts & Nevis Patriots; 149/6 (20 overs)	v	St Lucia Stars (H); 150/3 (15.4 overs)
Marlon Samuels 52* 37; Shannon Gabriel 3/19 (4 overs)		Johnson Charles 69* 44; Nikhil Dutta 2/32 (4 overs)

St Lucia won by 7 wickets
Beausejour Stadium, Gros Islet, St Lucia
Umpires: Patrick Gustard (WI) and John Ward (Aus)
Player of the match: Shannon Gabriel (Lucia)

- St Kitts and Nevis Patriots won the toss and elected to bat
- Nikhil Dutta (Kitts) made his CPL debut.

25 June
20:00 (D/N)
Scorecard

Trinbago Knight Riders; 95/9 (20 overs)	v	Barbados Tridents (H); 98/2 (13.1 overs)
Dwayne Bravo 30 (28); Jason Holder 3/11 (4 overs)		Dilshan Munaweera 39 (28); Sulieman Benn 2/24 (3.1 overs)

Barbados won by 8 wickets
Kensington Oval, Bridgetown, Barbados
Umpires: Mick Martell (Aus) and Peter Nero (WI)
Player of the match: Jason Holder (Bar)

- Trinidad & Tobago Red Steel won the toss and elected to bat

26 June
20:00 (D/N)
Scorecard

(H) St Lucia Stars; 156/6 (18 Overs)	v	Guyana Amazon Warriors; 154/5 (18 Overs)
Johnson Charles 47 (26); Veerasammy Permaul 2/24 (4 overs)		Brad Hodge 45* (30); Eddie Leie 2/25 (3 overs)

St Lucia won by 2 runs (D/L method)
Beausejour Stadium, Gros Islet, St Lucia
Umpires: John Ward (Aus) and Joel Wilson (WI)
Player of the match: Johnson Charles (Lucia)

- Guyana Amazon Warriors won the toss and elected to field
- Match was reduced to 18 overs per side due to rain.

27 June
16:00
Scorecard

St Kitts & Nevis Patriots; 143/8 (20 overs)	v	Barbados Tridents (H); 142/7 (20 overs)
Orlando Peters 27 (22); Rayad Emrit 2/29 (4 overs)		Kieron Pollard 82 (58); Sheldon Cottrell 2/13 (4 overs)

St Kitts & Nevis won by 1 run
Kensington Oval, Bridgetown, Barbados
Umpires: Nigel Duguid (WI) and Peter Nero (WI)
Player of the match: Kieron Pollard (Bar)

- Barbados Tridents won the toss and elected to field

28 June
16:00
Scorecard

(H) St Lucia Stars; 118/9 (20 overs)	v	Jamaica Tallawahs; 121/0 (10 overs)
Johnson Charles 29 (22); Krishmar Santokie 3/24 (4 overs)		Chris Gayle 90* (36)

Jamaica won by 10 wickets
Beausejour Stadium, Gros Islet, St Lucia
Umpires: Patrick Gustard (WI) and Joel Wilson (WI)
Player of the match: Chris Gayle (Jam)

- Jamaica Tallawahs won the toss and elected to field

30 June
18:00 (D/N)
Scorecard

St Kitts & Nevis Patriots; 160/5 (20 overs)	v	Jamaica Tallawahs; 164/3 (19.1 overs)
Martin Guptill 53 (49); Krishmar Santokie 4/37 (4 overs)		Chris Gayle 72 (54); Carlos Brathwaite 1/13 (2.1 overs)

Jamaica won by 7 wickets
Warner Park Stadium, Basseterre, St Kitts
Umpires: Nigel Duguid (WI) and Mick Martell (Aus)
Player of the match: Chris Gayle (Jam)

- St Kitts and Nevis Patriots won the toss and elected to bat

1 July
18:00 (D/N)
Scorecard

Barbados Tridents; 148/8 (20 overs)	v	St Lucia Stars; 133/9 (20 overs)
Shoaib Malik 51 (34); Darren Sammy 2/28 (4 overs)		Andre Fletcher 52 (38); Rayad Emrit 3/20 (4 overs)

Barbados won by 15 runs
Warner Park Stadium, Basseterre, St Kitts
Umpires: Patrick Gustard (WI) and John Ward (Aus)
Player of the match: Shoaib Malik (Bar)

- Barbados Tridents won the toss and elected to bat

3 July
16:00
Scorecard

St Kitts & Nevis Patriots; 149/9 (20 overs)	v	Guyana Amazon Warriors; 150/3 (16 overs)
Martin Guptill 34 (31); Ronsford Beaton 3/39 (4 overs)		Denesh Ramdin 41* (33); Sohail Tanvir 1/17 (3 overs)

Guyana won by 7 wickets
Warner Park Stadium, Basseterre, St Kitts
Umpires: Mick Martell (Aus) and Peter Nero (WI)
Player of the match: Denesh Ramdin (Guy)

- St Kitts and Nevis Patriots won the toss and elected to bat

3 July
20:00 (D/N)
Scorecard

St Lucia Stars; 202/5 (20 overs)	v	Barbados Tridents; 172/7 (20 overs)
Andre Fletcher 77 (50); Jeevan Mendis 3/33 (4 overs)		Jason Holder 31* (19); Darren Sammy 3/35 (4 overs)

St Lucia won by 30 runs
Warner Park Stadium, Basseterre, St Kitts
Umpires: John Ward (Aus) and Joel Wilson (WI)
Player of the match: Andre Fletcher (Lucia)

- St Lucia Zouks won the toss and elected to bat

4 July
12:00
Scorecard

(home team) St Kitts & Nevis Patriots; 199/5 (20 overs)	v	Jamaica Tallawahs; 80 (16 overs)
Evin Lewis 82 (45); Krishmar Santokie 1/38 (4 overs)		Chris Lynn 20 (20); Tabraiz Shamsi 4/23 (4 overs)

St Kitts & Nevis won by 119 runs
Warner Park Stadium, Basseterre, St Kitts
Umpires: Nigel Duguid (WI) and Peter Nero (WI)
Player of the match: Evin Lewis (Kitts)

- Jamaica Tallawahs won the toss and elected to field

4 July
16:00
Scorecard

Guyana Amazon Warriors; 118 (19.4 overs)	v	Trinbago Knight Riders; 121/7 (19.5 overs)
Lendl Simmons 50 (48); Dwayne Bravo 4/18 (4 overs)		Kamran Akmal 30 (17); Devendra Bishoo 4/24 (3.5 overs)

Trinbago won by 3 wickets
Warner Park Stadium, Basseterre, St Kitts
Umpires: Patrick Gustard (WI) and Joel Wilson (WI)
Player of the match: Dwayne Bravo (Tri)

- Guyana Amazon Warriors won the toss and elected to bat

6 July
18:00 (D/N)
Scorecard

Barbados Tridents; 135/8 (20 overs)	v	St Kitts & Nevis Patriots (home team); 131/2 (17.1 overs)
Kieron Pollard 49 (33); Tabraiz Shamsi 4/10 (4 overs)		Marlon Samuels 71* (54); Dwayne Smith 1/12 (1 over)

St Kitts & Nevis won by 8 wickets
Warner Park Stadium, Basseterre, St Kitts
Umpires: Nigel Duguid (WI) and Mick Martell (Aus)
Player of the match: Tabraiz Shamsi (Kitts)

- Barbados Tridents won the toss and elected to bat

7 July
18:00 (D/N)
Scorecard

St Lucia Stars; 158/4 (20 overs)	v	Jamaica Tallawahs (H); 159/1 (16 overs)
Kevin Pietersen 83* (57); Krishmar Santokie 2/29 (4 overs)		Chadwick Walton 76 (48); Fidel Edwards 1/33 (4 overs)

Jamaica won by 9 wickets
Sabina Park, Kingston, Jamaica
Umpires: Patrick Gustard (WI) and John Ward (Aus)
Player of the match: Chadwick Walton (Jam)

- Jamaica Tallawahs won the toss and elected to field
- Darren Sammy (Lucia) retired hurt at 149/4 (19.3 overs)

8 July
18:00 (D/N)
Scorecard

(home team) St Kitts & Nevis Patriots; 158/6 (20 overs)	v	Guyana Amazon Warriors; 146/2 (16.4 overs)
Marlon Samuels 61 (40); Ronsford Beaton 2/27 (3 overs)		Brad Hodge 61* (36); Sheldon Cottrell 2/46 (4 overs)

Guyana won by 23 runs (D/L method)
Warner Park Stadium, Basseterre, St Kitts
Umpires: Mick Martell (Aus) and Peter Nero (WI)
Player of the match: Brad Hodge (Guy)

- St Kitts and Nevis Patriots won the toss and elected to bat
- Rain interrupted the Guyana innings at 16.4 overs, and Guyana received their target 124 runs from 16.4 overs

9 July
18:00 (D/N)
Scorecard

(H) Jamaica Tallawahs; 180/6 (20 overs)	v	Trinbago Knight Riders; 130/9 (20 overs)
Chris Gayle 105 (57); Sulieman Benn 2/19 (3 overs)		Jacques Kallis 46 (36); Krishmar Santokie 3/27 (4 overs)

Jamaica won by 50 runs
Sabina Park, Kingston, Jamaica
Umpires: John Ward (Aus) and Joel Wilson (WI)
Player of the match: Chris Gayle (Jam)

- Trinidad & Tobago Red Steel won the toss and elected to field
- Mark Deyal (T&T) made his CPL and T20 debut

10 July
20:00 (D/N)
Scorecard

(home team) St Kitts & Nevis Patriots; 170/8 (20 overs)	v	St Lucia Stars; 144/9 (20 overs)
Shane Dowrich 38 (20); Nathan McCullum 4/22 (4 overs)		Andre Fletcher 59 (43); Carlos Brathwaite 3/38 (4 overs)

St Kitts & Nevis won by 26 runs
Warner Park Stadium, Basseterre, St Kitts
Umpires: Nigel Duguid (WI) and Peter Nero (WI)
Player of the match: Shane Dowrich (Kitts)

- St Lucia Zouks won the toss and elected to field
- Jomel Warrican made his CPL and T20 debut

11 July
12:00
Scorecard

(home team) St Kitts & Nevis Patriots; 146 (20 overs)	v	Trinbago Knight Riders; 148/4 (18.5 overs)
Devon Thomas 44 (23); Dwayne Bravo 4/29 (4 overs)		William Perkins 64* (43); Sohail Tanvir 1/26 (4 overs)

Trinbago won by 6 wickets
Warner Park Stadium, Basseterre, St Kitts
Umpires: Patrick Gustard (WI) and Joel Wilson (WI)
Player of the match: Dwayne Bravo (Tri)

- St Kitts and Nevis Patriots won the toss and elected to bat

11 July
18:00 (D/N)
Scorecard

Barbados Tridents; 146/7 (20 overs)	v	Jamaica Tallawahs (H); 129/7 (20 overs)
Kieron Pollard 59* (37); Andre Russell 2/18 (4 overs)		Chadwick Walton 46 (44); Robin Peterson 3/13 (3 overs)

Barbados won by 17 runs
Sabina Park, Kingston, Jamaica
Umpires: Nigel Duguid (WI) and Mick Martell (Aus)
Player of the match: Kieron Pollard (Bar)

- Barbados Tridents won the toss and elected to bat

12 July
16:00
Scorecard

Guyana Amazon Warriors; 179/3 (20 overs)	v	Jamaica Tallawahs (H); 95 (15.5 overs)
Brad Hodge 65* (30); Krishmar Santokie 1/17 (4 overs)		Andre Russell 28 (14); Ronsford Beaton 4/9 (2.5 overs)

Guyana won by 84 runs
Sabina Park, Kingston, Jamaica
Umpires: Patrick Gustard (WI) and John Ward (Aus)
Player of the match: Brad Hodge (Guy)

- Jamaica Tallawahs won the toss and elected to field

14 July
18:00 (D/N)
Scorecard

(H) Trinbago Knight Riders; 90/4 (9 overs)	v	St Lucia Stars; 91/6 (9 overs)
Jacques Kallis 38 (19); Delorn Johnson 2/27 (2 overs)		Johnson Charles 41 (23); Jacques Kallis 3/15 (2 overs)

St Lucia won by 4 wickets
Queens Park Oval, Port Of Spain, Trinidad and Tobago
Umpires: Mick Martell (Aus) and Peter Nero (WI)
Player of the match: Johnson Charles (Lucia)

- St Lucia Zouks won the toss and elected to field
- Due to rain play started at 20:50, and reduced to 9 overs per side

15 July
18:00 (D/N)
Scorecard

(H) Guyana Amazon Warriors	v	Jamaica Tallawahs

Match abandoned without a ball bowled
Providence Stadium, Georgetown, Guyana
Umpires: Nandkumar Shivsankar (WI) and John Ward (Aus)

- No toss

16 July
20:00 (D/N)
Scorecard

(H) Trinbago Knight Riders; 184/3 (20 overseas)	v	Barbados Tridents; 112 (18.4 overs)
Darren Bravo 80* (44); Robin Peterson 1/14 (3 overs)		Misbah-ul-Haq 19 (15); Dwayne Bravo 3/16 (3.4 overs)

Trinbago won by 72 runs
Queens Park Oval, Port Of Spain, Trinidad And Tobago
Umpires: Nigel Duguid (WI) and Peter Nero (WI)
Player of the match: Darren Bravo (Tri)

- Triniidad & Tobago Red Steel won the toss and elected to bat

17 July
20:00 (D/N)
Scorecard

St Lucia Stars; 111/7 (20 overs)	v	Guyana Amazon Warriors (H); 112/7 (18 overs)
Henry Davids 25* (34); Sunil Narine 3/6 (4 overs)		Denesh Ramdin 39* (45); Keron Cottoy 4/18 (4 overs)

Guyana won by 3 wickets
Providence Stadium, Georgetown, Guyana
Umpires: Patrick Gustard (WI) and Nandkumar Shivsankar (WI)
Player of the match: Sunil Narine (Guy)

- Guyana Amazon Warriors won the toss and elected to field

18 July
12:00
Scorecard

(H) Trinbago Knight Riders; 134/5 (14 overs)	v	St Kitts & Nevis Patriots; 123/7 (14 overs)
Darren Bravo 40 (15); Tabraiz Shamsi 1/9 (3 overs)		Evin Lewis 40 (22); Dwayne Bravo 3/15 (3 overs)

Trinbago won by 18 runs (D/L method)
Queens Park Oval, Port Of Spain, Trinidad And Tobago
Umpires: Nigel Duguid (WI) and Mick Martell (Aus)
Player of the match: Darren Bravo (Tri)

- Trinidad & Tobago Red Steel won the toss and elected to bat
- Rain interrupted the Trinidad & Tobago innings at 8.6 overs, match was reduced to 14 overs per side and St Kitts received a target of 142

18 July
16:00
Scorecard

Barbados Tridents; 125/9 (20 overs)	v	Guyana Amazon Warriors (H); 111/6 (20 overs)
Jason Holder 30 (17); David Wiese 5/30 (4 overs)		Brad Hodge 27 (28); Kieron Pollard 4/30 (4 overs)

Barbados won by 14 runs
Providence Stadium, Georgetown, Guyana
Umpires: Patrick Gustard (WI) and John Ward (Aus)
Player of the match: Rayad Emrit (Bar)

- Barbados Tridents won the toss and elected to bat

19 July
16:00
Scorecard

(H) Trinbago Knight Riders; 145/3 (20 overs)	v	Jamaica Tallawahs; 138/9 (20 overs)
Jacques Kallis 61* (51); Jerome Taylor 1/27 (4 overs)		Andre Russell 36 (22); Samuel Badree 3/35 (4 overs)

Trinbago won by 7 runs
Queens Park Oval, Port Of Spain, Trinidad And Tobago
Umpires: Mick Martell (Aus) and Peter Nero (WI)
Player of the match: Dwayne Bravo (Tri)

- Trinidad & Tobago Red Steel won the toss and elected to bat

21 July
18:00 (D/N)
Scorecard

Trinbago Knight Riders; 117/8 (20 overs)	v	Guyana Amazon Warriors (H); 118/3 (17 overs)
Cameron Delport 44 (30); Marchant de Lange 4/23 (4 overs)		Lendl Simmons 65* (51); Dwayne Bravo 2/22 (3 overs)

Guyana won by 7 wickets
Providence Stadium, Georgetown, Guyana
Umpires: Nandkumar Shivsankar (WI) and John Ward (Aus)
Player of the match: Lendl Simmons (Guy)

- Trinidad & Tobago Red Steel won the toss and elected to bat

== Knockout stage ==
Semi-final 1
3	Trinbago Knight Riders (H)	153/6 (20 ov)
4	Jamaica Tallawahs	125 (19.3 ov)

Semi-final 2
2	Guyana Amazon Warriors	108/9 (20 ov)
3	Trinbago Knight Riders (H)	109/4 (18.3 ov)

The Final
1	Barbados Tridents	158/4 (20 ov)
3	Trinbago Knight Riders (H)	178/5 (20 ov)

=== Results ===
==== Semi-final 1 ====
Round 1
23 July
18:00 (D/N)
Scorecard

(H) Trinbago Knight Riders; 152/6 (20 overs)	v	Jamaica Tallawahs; 125 (19.3 overs)
Darren Bravo 86* (63); Jerome Taylor 2/28 (4 overs)		Chadwick Walton 31 (30); Dwayne Bravo 5/23 (4 overs)

Trinbago won by 27 runs
Queens Park Oval, Port Of Spain, Trinidad And Tobago
Umpires: Mick Martell (Aus) and John Ward (Aus)
Player of the match: Darren Bravo (Tri)

- Trinidad & Tobago Red Steel won the toss and elected to bat
- Winner of this match plays in Semi-final 2

==== Semi-final 2 ====
Round 2
25 July
16:30 (D/N)
Scorecard

Guyana Amazon Warriors; 108/9 (20 overs)	v	Trinbago Knight Riders (H); 109/4 (18.3 overs)
Lendl Simmons 64 (51); Samuel Badree 2/9 (4 overs)		Kamran Akmal 49 (41); Devendra Bishoo 1/15 (4 overs)

Trinbago won by 6 wickets
Queens Park Oval, Port Of Spain, Trinidad And Tobago
Umpires: Mick Martell (Aus) and Peter Nero (WI)
Player of the match: Kamran Akmal (Tri)

- Guyana Amazon Warriors won the toss and elected to bat
- Winner of this match plays in Final

==== Final ====
Round 3
26 July
16:30 (D/N)
Scorecard

(H) Trinbago Knight Riders; 178/5 (20 overs)	v	Barbados Tridents; 158/4 (20 overs)
Kamran Akmal 60 (46); Rayad Emrit 2/25 (4 overs)		Dwayne Smith 49 (30); Sulieman Benn 2/24 (4 overs)

Trinbago won by 20 runs
Queens Park Oval, Port Of Spain, Trinidad And Tobago
Umpires: Peter Nero (WI) and John Ward (Aus)
Player of the match: Kamran Akmal (Tri)

- Trinidad & Tobago Red Steel won the toss and elected to bat
- This match is Trinbago's first ever CPL final

== Statistics ==
=== Most runs ===
Player	Team	Matches	Runs	High score
Chris Gayle	Jamaica Tallawahs	10	430	105
Andre Fletcher	St Lucia Stars	10	369	77
Marlon Samuels	St Kitts & Nevis Patriots	10	325	71 not out
Lendl Simmons	Guyana Amazon Warriors	9	317	65 not out
Jacques Kallis	Trinbago Knight Riders	13	304	61 not out

- Source: Cricinfo

=== Most wickets ===
Player	Team	Matches	Wickets	Best bowling
Dwayne Bravo	Trinbago Knight Riders	13	28	5/23
Krishmar Santokie	Jamaica Tallawahs	10	16	4/37
Sunil Narine	Guyana Amazon Warriors	10	14	3/6
Kieron Pollard	Barbados Tridents	11	14	4/30
Robin Peterson	Barbados Tridents	11	14	3/13

- Source: Cricinfo
