= West Indian cricket team in Bangladesh in 2011–12 =

West Indian cricket team in Bangladesh in 2011
	Bangladesh	West Indies
- Dates: October 2011 – November 2011
Captains	Mushfiqur Rahim	Darren Sammy

Test series
- Result: West Indies won the 2-match series 1–0
Most runs	Tamim Iqbal (186)	Kirk Edwards (252)
Most wickets	Shakib Al Hasan (10)	Devendra Bishoo (11)
- Player of the series: Shakib Al Hasan

One Day International series
- Results: West Indies won the 3-match series 2–1
Most runs	Mushfiqur Rahim (100)	Lendl Simmons (202)
Most wickets	Shakib Al Hasan (6)	Ravi Rampaul (4)
- Player of the series: Marlon Samuels

Twenty20 International series
- Results: Bangladesh won the 1-match series 1–0
Most runs	Mushfiqur Rahim (41)	Marlon Samuels (58)
Most wickets	Shafiul Islam (2)	Marlon Samuels (2)
- Player of the series: Mushfiqur Rahim

The West Indies cricket team toured Bangladesh in October-November 2011. The tour consisted of one Twenty20 (T20), two Test matches and three One Day Internationals (ODIs).

== Squads ==
Tests		Limited overs	
Bangladesh	West Indies	Bangladesh	West Indies
Mushfiqur Rahim (c & wk); Tamim Iqbal; Imrul Kayes; Shakib Al Hasan; Raqibul Hasan; Naeem Islam; Nasir Hossain; Shahriar Nafees; Rubel Hossain; Nazmul Hossain; Shahadat Hossain; Suhrawadi Shuvo; Shuvagoto Hom; Elias Sunny	Darren Sammy (c); Adrian Barath; Carlton Baugh (wk); Devendra Bishoo; Kraigg Brathwaite; Darren Bravo; Shivnarine Chanderpaul; Fidel Edwards; Kirk Edwards; Kieran Powell; Denesh Ramdin (wk); Ravi Rampaul; Kemar Roach; Marlon Samuels; Shane Shillingford	Mushfiqur Rahim (c) & (wk); Mahmudullah (vc); Tamim Iqbal; Imrul Kayes; Mohammad Ashraful; Shakib Al Hasan; Alok Kapali; Naeem Islam; Nasir Hossain; Abdur Razzak; Elias Sunny; Rubel Hossain; Shafiul Islam; Nazmul Hossain	Darren Sammy (c); Adrian Barath; Devendra Bishoo; Carlos Brathwaite; Darren Bravo; Danza Hyatt; Anthony Martin; Kieron Pollard; Kieran Powell; Denesh Ramdin (wk); Ravi Rampaul; Kemar Roach; Andre Russell; Marlon Samuels; Lendl Simmons

== Tour matches ==
=== Bangladesh Cricket Board XI v West Indians ===
7 October 2011
Scorecard

West Indians; 217/9 (45 overs)	v	Bangladesh Cricket Board XI; 152 (41 overs)
Darren Bravo 47 (74); Mohammad Ashraful 3/9 (2 overs)		Alok Kapali 41 (56); Ravi Rampaul 4/23 (9 overs)

West Indians won by 65 runs
Fatullah Osmani Stadium, Fatullah
Umpires: Enamul Haque and Sharfuddoula

- Bangladesh Cricket Board XI, who chose to field

=== Bangladesh Cricket Board XI v West Indians ===
9 October 2011
Scorecard

West Indians; 195/3 (20 overs)	v	Bangladesh Cricket Board XI; 120/6 (20 overs)
Marlon Samuels 102 (56); Farhad Reza 2/37 (4 overs)		Shahriar Nafees 29 (34); Marlon Samuels 2/18 (4 overs)

West Indians won by 75 runs
Fatullah Osmani Stadium, Fatullah
Umpires: Masudur Rahman and Nadir Shah

- West Indians won the toss and elected to bat

== Twenty20 Series ==
=== Only T20I ===
11 October (D/N)
Scorecard

West Indies; 132/8 (20 overs)	v	Bangladesh; 135/7 (19.5 overs)
Marlon Samuels 58 (42); Shafiul Islam 2/19 (4 overs)		Mushfiqur Rahim 41* (26); Marlon Samuels 2/14 (4 overs)

Bangladesh won by 3 wickets
Sher-e-Bangla Cricket Stadium, Mirpur
Umpires: Enamul Haque (Ban) and Nadir Shah (Ban)
Player of the match: Mushfiqur Rahim (Ban)

- Bangladesh won the toss and elected to field

== ODI series ==
=== 1st ODI ===
13 October 2011 (D/N)
Scorecard

West Indies; 298/4 (50 overs)	v	Bangladesh; 258/7 (50 overs)
Lendl Simmons 122 (124); Rubel Hossain 3/65 (10 overs)		Shakib Al Hasan 67* (58); Ravi Rampaul 2/35 (10 overs)

West Indies won by 40 runs
Sher-e-Bangla Cricket Stadium, Mirpur
Umpires: Enamul Haque (Ban) and Paul Reiffel (Aus)
Player of the match: Lendl Simmons (WI)

- Bangladesh won the toss and elected to field

=== 2nd ODI ===
15 October 2011 (D/N)
Scorecard

Bangladesh; 220 (50 overs)	v	West Indies; 221/2 (42.2 overs)
Mushfiqur Rahim 69 (109); Shakib Al Hasan 2/30 (10 overs)		Marlon Samuels 88 (74); Kemar Roach 3/49 (10 overs)

West Indies won by 8 wickets
Sher-e-Bangla Cricket Stadium, Mirpur
Umpires: Nadir Shah (Ban) and Paul Reiffel (Aus)
Player of the match: Marlon Samuels (WI)

- Bangladesh won the toss and chose to bat

=== 3rd ODI ===
18 October 2011
Scorecard

West Indies; 61 (22 overs)	v	Bangladesh; 62/2 (20 overs)
Kieran Powell 25 (36); Shakib Al Hasan 4/16 (5 overs)		Tamim Iqbal 36*; Marlon Samuels 1/15 (8 overs)

Bangladesh win by 8 wickets
Zohur Ahmed Chowdhury Stadium, Chittagong
Umpires: Enamul Haque (Ban) & Paul Reiffel (Aus)
Player of the match: Shakib Al Hasan (Ban)

- Bangladesh won the toss and elected to field
- ODI debuts: Carlos Brathwaite (WI)

== Test series ==
=== 1st Test ===
21–25 October
Scorecard

Bangladesh	v	West Indies
350/9d (122.4 overs); Mushfiqur Rahim 68 (145); Devendra Bishoo 3/81 (30 overs)		244 (68 overs); Darren Sammy 58 (43); Elias Sunny 6/94 (23 overs)
119/3d (42 overs); Shahriar Nafees 50 (91); Darren Sammy 1/9 (6 overs)		100/2 (22 overs); Lendl Simmons 44 (49); Elias Sunny 1/34 (6 overs)

Match drawn
Zohur Ahmed Chowdhury Stadium, Chittagong
Umpires: Kumar Dharmasena (SL) and Nigel Llong (Eng)
Player of the match: Elias Sunny (Ban)

- Bangladesh won the toss and elected to bat
- Test debuts: Elias Sunny and Nasir Hossain (Ban)

=== 2nd Test ===
29 October – 2 November
Scorecard

West Indies	v	Bangladesh
355 (126.4 overs); Kirk Edwards 121 (273); Shakib Al Hasan 5/63 (34.4 overs)		231 (68 overs); Shakib Al Hasan 73 (74); Fidel Edwards 5/63 (13 overs)
383/5(dec (111.3 overs); Darren Bravo 195 (297); Suhrawadi Shuvo 3/73 (26.3 overs)		278 (80.2 overs); Tamim Iqbal 83 (158); Devendra Bishoo 5/90 (25 overs)

West Indies won by 229 runs
Sher-e-Bangla Cricket Stadium, Mirpur
Umpires: Kumar Dharmasena (Sri) and Nigel Llong (Eng)
Player of the match: Kirk Edwards (WIN)

- West Indies won the toss and elected to bat
