= Indian cricket team in the West Indies in 2011 =

International cricket tour

Indian cricket team in West Indies in 2011
	West Indies	India
- Dates: 4 June – 10 July 2011
Captains	Darren Sammy	Suresh Raina (ODIs and T20Is); Mahendra Singh Dhoni (Tests)

Test series
- Result: India won the 3-match series 1–0
Most runs	Shivnarine Chanderpaul (241)	Rahul Dravid (251)
Most wickets	Fidel Edwards (19)	Ishant Sharma (22)
- Player of the series: Ishant Sharma (Ind)

One Day International series
- Results: India won the 5-match series 3–2
Most runs	Ramnaresh Sarwan (216)	Rohit Sharma (257)
Most wickets	Anthony Martin (8); Andre Russell (8)	Amit Mishra (11)
- Player of the series: Rohit Sharma (Ind)

Twenty20 International series
- Results: India won the 1-match series 1–0
Most runs	Darren Bravo (41)	Subramaniam Badrinath (43)
Most wickets	Darren Sammy (4)	Harbhajan Singh (2)

The Indian cricket team toured the West Indies from 4 June to 10 July 2011. The tour consisted of one Twenty20 (T20), five One Day Internationals (ODIs) and three Tests.

gge

== Squads ==
Limited overs		Tests	
India	West Indies	India	West Indies
Suresh Raina (c); Harbhajan Singh; Ravichandran Ashwin; Subramaniam Badrinath; Shikhar Dhawan; Virat Kohli; Praveen Kumar; Amit Mishra; Munaf Patel; Parthiv Patel (wk); Yusuf Pathan; Wriddhiman Saha (wk); Ishant Sharma; Rohit Sharma; Manoj Tiwary	Darren Sammy (c); Adrian Barath; Christopher Barnwell; Carlton Baugh (wk); Devendra Bishoo; Darren Bravo; Dwayne Bravo; Kirk Edwards; Andre Fletcher (wk); Danza Hyatt; Anthony Martin; Ashley Nurse; Kieron Pollard; Ravi Rampaul; Kemar Roach; Andre Russell; Marlon Samuels; Krishmar Santokie; Ramnaresh Sarwan; Lendl Simmons	MS Dhoni (c) and (wk); VVS Laxman; Subramaniam Badrinath; Rahul Dravid; Harbhajan Singh; Virat Kohli; Praveen Kumar; Amit Mishra; Abhimanyu Mithun; Abhinav Mukund; Pragyan Ojha; Munaf Patel; Parthiv Patel (wk); Suresh Raina; Ishant Sharma; Murali Vijay	Darren Sammy (c); Adrian Barath; Carlton Baugh (wk); Devendra Bishoo; Darren Bravo; Shivnarine Chanderpaul; Fidel Edwards; Kirk Edwards; Brendan Nash; Kieran Powell; Ravi Rampaul; Kemar Roach; Marlon Samuels; Ramnaresh Sarwan; Lendl Simmons

== T20I series ==
=== Only T20I ===
4 June
Scorecard

India; 159/6 (20 overs)	v	West Indies; 143/5 (20 overs)
Subramaniam Badrinath 43 (37); Darren Sammy 4/16 (4 overs)		Darren Bravo 41 (41); Harbhajan Singh 2/25 (4 overs)

India won by 16 runs
Queen's Park Oval, Port of Spain, Trinidad
Umpires: Norman Malcolm and Peter Nero (both WI)
Player of the match: Subramaniam Badrinath (Ind)

- West Indies won the toss and elected to field.
- Parthiv Patel, Shikhar Dhawan and Subramaniam Badrinath (Ind) all made their T20I debuts.

== ODI series ==
=== 1st ODI ===
6 June
Scorecard

West Indies; 214/9 (50 overs)	v	India; 217/6 (44.5 overs)
Ramnaresh Sarwan 56 (94); Harbhajan Singh 3/32 (10 overs)		Rohit Sharma 68* (75); Anthony Martin 2/39 (10 overs)

India won by 4 wickets
Queen's Park Oval, Port of Spain, Trinidad
Umpires: Ian Gould (Eng) and Peter Nero (WI)
Player of the match: Rohit Sharma (Ind)

- West Indies won the toss and elected to bat.

=== 2nd ODI ===
8 June
Scorecard

West Indies; 240/9 (50 overs)	v	India; 183/3 (33.4 overs)
Ramnaresh Sarwan 56 (90); Amit Mishra 4/31 (10 overs)		Virat Kohli 81 (103); Anthony Martin 1/29 (4 overs)

India won by 7 wickets (D/L)
Queen's Park Oval, Port of Spain, Trinidad
Umpires: Ian Gould (Eng) and Peter Nero (WI)
Player of the match: Virat Kohli (Ind)

- India won the toss and elected to field.
- Rain twice interrupted India's innings, adjusting their target to 183 runs from 37 overs via the Duckworth–Lewis method.

=== 3rd ODI ===
11 June
Scorecard

West Indies; 225/8 (50 overs)	v	India; 228/7 (46.2 overs)
Andre Russell 92* (64); Amit Mishra 3/28 (10 overs)		Rohit Sharma 86* (91); Devendra Bishoo 2/41 (10 overs)

India won by 3 wickets
Sir Vivian Richards Stadium, North Sound, Antigua
Umpires: Ian Gould (Eng) and Norman Malcolm (WI)
Player of the match: Andre Russell (WI)

- India won the toss and elected to field.
- Danza Hyatt (WI) made his ODI debut.

=== 4th ODI ===
13 June
Scorecard

West Indies; 249/8 (50 overs)	v	India; 146 (39 overs)
Kieron Pollard 70 (72); Praveen Kumar 3/37 (10 overs)		Rohit Sharma 39 (47); Anthony Martin 4/36 (10 overs)

West Indies won by 103 runs
Sir Vivian Richards Stadium, North Sound, Antigua
Umpires: Ian Gould (Eng) and Norman Malcolm (WI)
Player of the match: Anthony Martin (WI)

- India won the toss and elected to field.

=== 5th ODI ===
16 June
Scorecard

India; 251 (47.3 overs)	v	West Indies; 255/3 (48.4 overs)
Virat Kohli 94 (104); Andre Russell 4/35 (8.3 overs)		Darren Bravo 86 (99); Amit Mishra 2/46 (10 overs)

West Indies won by 7 wickets
Sabina Park, Kingston, Jamaica
Umpires: Ian Gould (Eng) and Joel Wilson (WI)
Player of the match: Andre Russell (WI)

- West Indies won the toss and elected to field.

== Test series ==
=== 1st Test ===
20–24 June
Scorecard

India	v	West Indies
246 (61.2 overs); Suresh Raina 82 (115); Fidel Edwards 4/56 (16 overs)		173 (67.5 overs); Adrian Barath 64 (122); Ishant Sharma 3/29 (17 overs)
252 (94.5 overs); Rahul Dravid 112 (274); Darren Sammy 4/52 (27 overs)		262 (68.2 overs); Darren Bravo 41 (36); Praveen Kumar 3/42 (16 overs)

India won by 63 runs
Sabina Park, Kingston, Jamaica
Umpires: Ian Gould (Eng) and Daryl Harper (Aus)
Player of the match: Rahul Dravid (Ind)

- India won the toss and elected to bat.
- Virat Kohli, Praveen Kumar and Abhinav Mukund (all Ind) made their Test debuts.

=== 2nd Test ===
28 June–2 July
Scorecard

India	v	West Indies
201 (68 overs); VVS Laxman 85 (146); Ravi Rampaul 3/38 (16 overs)		190 (73.5 overs); Marlon Samuels 78* (172); Ishant Sharma 6/55 (21.5 overs)
269/6d (102 overs); VVS Laxman 87 (188); Fidel Edwards 5/76 (23 overs)		202/7 (71.3 overs); Darren Bravo 73 (174); Ishant Sharma 4/53 (19.3 overs)

Match drawn
Kensington Oval, Bridgetown, Barbados
Umpires: Asad Rauf (Pak) and Ian Gould (Eng)
Player of the match: Ishant Sharma (Ind)

- West Indies won the toss and elected to field.

=== 3rd Test ===
6–10 July
Scorecard

West Indies	v	India
204 (76.3 overs); Carlton Baugh 60 (79); Ishant Sharma 5/77 (21.3 overs)		347 (108.2 overs); MS Dhoni 74 (133); Fidel Edwards 5/103 (28.2 overs)
322 (131.3 overs); Shivnarine Chanderpaul 116* (343); Harbhajan Singh 4/75 (42 overs)		94/3 (32 overs); Murali Vijay 45 (78); Ravi Rampaul 2/31 (11 overs)

Match drawn
Windsor Park, Roseau, Dominica
Umpires: Asad Rauf (Pak) and Richard Kettleborough (Eng)
Player of the match: Shivnarine Chanderpaul (WI)

- India won the toss and elected to field.
- Harbhajan Singh (Ind) took his 400th test wicket.
