= Indian cricket team in the West Indies in 2009 =

Indian cricket team in West Indies in 2009
	India	West Indies
- Dates: 26 June – 5 July 2009
Captains	MS Dhoni	Chris Gayle

One Day International series
- Results: India won the 4-match series 2–1
Most runs	MS Dhoni (182)	Runako Morton (161)
Most wickets	Ashish Nehra (6)	Dwayne Bravo (6)
- Player of the series: MS Dhoni (Ind)

The Indian cricket team toured the Caribbean from 26 June to 5 July 2009 for a four-match One Day International series against the West Indies. This tour was India's reciprocal tour of the Caribbean, after West Indies visited them in January 2007. The series was won 2–1 by India.

== Background ==
India arrived in the Caribbean on the back of a strong performances in One Day Internationals (ODIs) having lost only three of their last 18 games. The team arrived two days after the World Twenty20 had ended, a tournament that the West Indies performed well in, that followed their poor show in the tour of England that year.

== Squads ==
West Indies	India
Chris Gayle (c); Denesh Ramdin (wk); Lionel Baker; Darren Bravo; Dwayne Bravo; Sulieman Benn; David Bernard; Shivnarine Chanderpaul; Narsingh Deonarine; Runako Morton; Ravi Rampaul; Ramnaresh Sarwan; Jerome Taylor	MS Dhoni (c) (wk); Yuvraj Singh (vc); Subramaniam Badrinath; Gautam Gambhir; Harbhajan Singh; Ravindra Jadeja; Dinesh Karthik; Praveen Kumar; Abhishek Nayar; Ashish Nehra; Pragyan Ojha; Yusuf Pathan; Ishant Sharma; Rohit Sharma; R. P. Singh; Murali Vijay

India team regulars Sachin Tendulkar, Zaheer Khan, Virender Sehwag and Suresh Raina were rested either due to injuries or fatigue, the latter on account of busy season that included the Indian Premier League. In their place, Ashish Nehra, Abhishek Nayar, R. P. Singh, Ravindra Jadeja, Subramaniam Badrinath and Murali Vijay were included in the squad. The West Indies squad was announced on 20 June for the first two ODIs. Darren Bravo and Narsingh Deonarine were included in the squad owing to their strong performances in the domestic circuit. All-rounder David Bernard was included as a replacement for an injured Fidel Edwards. The same squad was retained for the final two games.

== ODI series ==
=== 1st ODI ===
26 June
09:30
Scorecard

India; 339/6 (50 overs)	v	West Indies; 319 (48.1 overs)
Yuvraj Singh 131 (102); Dwayne Bravo 2/66 (10 overs)		Shivnarine Chanderpaul 63 (85); Ashish Nehra 3/49 (7.1 overs)

India won by 20 runs
Sabina Park, Kingston, Jamaica
Umpires: Nigel Llong (Eng) and Norman Malcolm (WI)
Player of the match: Yuvraj Singh (Ind)

- India won the toss and elected to bat.
- Darren Bravo (WI) made his ODI debut.

=== 2nd ODI ===
28 June
09:30
Scorecard

India; 188 (48.2 overs)	v	West Indies; 192/2 (34.1 overs)
MS Dhoni 95 (130); Ravi Rampaul 4/37 (10 overs)		Runako Morton 85* (102); Rohit Sharma 2/27 (8 overs)

West Indies won by 8 wickets
Sabina Park, Kingston, Jamaica
Umpires: Nigel Llong (Eng) and Norman Malcolm
Player of the match: Ravi Rampaul (Ind)

- India won the toss and elected to bat.
- Rohit Sharma (Ind) took his maiden ODI wicket

=== 3rd ODI ===
3 July
09:30
Scorecard

West Indies; 186/7 (27 overs)	v	India; 159/4 (21.5 overs)
Ramnaresh Sarwan 62 (59); Ashish Nehra 3/21 (5 overs)		Dinesh Karthik 47 (43); Sulieman Benn 1/31 (5 overs)

India won by 6 wickets (D/L)
Beausejour Stadium, Gros Islet, St Lucia
Umpires: Clyde Duncan (WI) and Nigel Llong (Eng)
Player of the match: MS Dhoni (Ind)

- India won the toss and elected to field.
- Rain initially reduced the match to 27 overs per side. After another intervention, India's target was set to 159 from 22 overs.
- Abhishek Nayar (Ind) made his ODI debut.

=== 4th ODI ===
5 July
09:30
Scorecard

West Indies; 27/1 (7.3 overs)	v	India
Runako Morton 12* (22); Ramnaresh Sarwan 12* (22); Ishant Sharma 1/17 (4 overs)

No result
Beausejour Stadium, Gros Islet, St Lucia
Umpires: Clyde Duncan (WI) and Nigel Llong (Eng)

- India won the toss and elected to field.
- Rain halted play after 7.3 overs and eventually the match was called off due to a wet outfield.

== Media coverage ==
Television networks

- Ten Sports (live) — India, Bangladesh, Nepal, Europe, Middle East, Japan, Hong Kong, Indonesia, Sri Lanka and Maldives
- Doordarshan (live) — India
- Sky Sports (live) — United Kingdom
- SuperSport (live) — South Africa, Zimbabwe and Kenya
- Fox Sports (highlights) — Australia
