= Kyle Corbin =

Barbadian cricketer

Personal information
- Full name: Kyle Anthony McDonald Corbin
- Born: 15 May 1990 (age 36); Saint George Parish, Barbados
- Batting: Right-handed

Domestic team information
- Years: Team
- 2009–2014: Combined Campuses
- 2010–2014: WIHPC
- 2014–present: Barbados
- 2014–2016: Barbados Tridents

Career statistics
Competition	FC	LA	T20
Matches	58	25	9
Runs scored	2675	345	121
Batting average	25.23	14.37	15.12
100s/50s	1/18	0/0	0/0
Top score	108	47*	47
Catches/stumpings	79/1	11/0	6/0
- Source: , 5 May 2017

Kyle Anthony McDonald Corbin (born 15 May 1990) is a Barbadian cricketer who played for the Barbadian national team in West Indian domestic cricket. A right-handed batsman and occasional wicket-keeper, he spent his early career with the Combined Campuses and Colleges, a development team.

From Saint George Parish, Corbin played for the West Indies under-19s at the 2008 Under-19 World Cup in Malaysia. He made his first-class debut the following year, playing for the Combined Campuses in the 2008–09 Regional Four Day Competition. In the last game of the season, against Trinidad and Tobago, he was named man of the match, with his 70 runs in the second innings being the only half-century of the match. During the 2010–11 Regional Four Day Competition, Corbin scored a maiden first-class century, 108 from 143 balls against the Leeward Islands.

Corbin made his List A debut during the 2010–11 WICB Cup, representing the Barbados-based Sagicor High Performance Centre (HPC). He also appeared for the HPC in the 2011–12 Regional Super50, but for the 2012–13 and 2013–14 seasons played for Combined Campuses in both the first-class and limited-overs competitions. For the 2014–15 Regional Four Day Competition, Corbin switched to play for his home country, Barbados. He also signed with the Barbados Tridents franchise for the 2015 Caribbean Premier League, making his debut in the tournament's final.
