= Creery =

Creery is a surname. Notable people with the surname include:

- Andrew McCreight Creery (1863–1942), Irish-born financial, real estate, and insurance agent and political figure in Canada
- Leslie Creery (1783–1849), Anglican priest in Ireland

== See also ==
- Creary
