= Crear =

Crear is a surname. Notable people with the surname include:

- Mark Crear (born 1968), American Olympic track athlete
- Steve Crear (fl. 1970s–1980s), Australian rugby league footballer

== See also ==
- Crean
- Creary
- Creer
