= Keron Cottoy =

West Indian cricketer

Personal information
- Full name: Keron Julius Cottoy
- Born: 14 November 1989 (age 36); Richland Park, Saint Vincent
- Batting: Left-handed
- Bowling: Right-arm leg spin

Domestic team information
- Years: Team
- 2010–2011: West Indies HPC
- 2011: Windward Islands
- 2015: Combined Campuses
- 2015: St Luci Stars
- First-class debut: 4 February 2011 Windward Islands v Combined Campuses and Colleges
- Last First-class: 12 March 2020 Windward Islands v Trinidad and Tobago
- List A debut: 15 October 2010 Sagicor High Performance Centre v Guyana
- Last List A: 18 February 2021 Windward Islands v Barbados

Career statistics
Competition	FC	LA	T20
Matches	11	40	14
Runs scored	479	567	132
Batting average	36.84	27.00	33.00
100s/50s	1/1	0/2	0/0
Top score	103*	72	27*
Balls bowled	922	1,416	132
Wickets	11	39	8
Bowling average	56.27	30.74	19.87
5 wickets in innings	0	1	0
10 wickets in match	0	0	0
Best bowling	3/41	5/37	4/18
Catches/stumpings	11/–	18/–	8/–
- Source: CricketArchive, 18 February 2021

Keron Julius Cottoy (born 14 November 1989) is a Vincentian cricketer who has played for several teams in West Indian domestic cricket. He has represented the St Lucia Zouks and St.Kitts Patriots franchises in the Caribbean Premier League (CPL).

A former Windward Islands under-19s player, Cottoy was a member of the inaugural intake of the West Indies High Performance Centre in 2010, and represented HPC teams at the 2010–11 WICB Cup and 2011–12 Regional Super50. He made his first-class debut for Windward Islands at the 2010–11 Regional Four Day Competition, which followed several games for the side at the 2010 Caribbean Twenty20. After a couple seasons with no higher-level appearances, Cottoy switched to the Combined Campuses and Colleges for the 2014–15 Regional Super50. He also signed with the St Lucia Zouks franchise for the 2015 Caribbean Premier League season, making his debut for the team against the St Kitts and Nevis Patriots. In Cottoy's third match for the Zouks, against the Guyana Amazon Warriors, he took a career-best 4/18 from four overs.

In October 2019, he was named in the Windward Islands' squad for the 2019–20 Regional Super50 tournament. In March 2020, in round six of the 2019–20 West Indies Championship, Cottoy scored his maiden century in first-class cricket.
