= Andre Creary =

Jamaican cricketer

Personal information
- Full name: Andre St Aubin Creary
- Born: 17 November 1990 (age 35); Saint Mary Parish, Jamaica
- Batting: Right-handed
- Bowling: Right-arm off spin
- Relatives: Tyson Gordon (half-brother)
- Source: CricketArchive, 29 December 2015

Andre St Aubin Creary (born 17 November 1990) is a Jamaican cricketer who captained the West Indies under-19s at the 2010 Under-19 World Cup, also playing at the 2008 tournament. He is a right-handed batsman and right-arm off spin bowler.

Born in Saint Mary Parish, Creary played at the 2008 Under-19 World Cup in Malaysia at the age of only 17. The previous year, aged 16, he had represented the team in two matches at the 2007–08 KFC Cup, which held List A status. In July 2009, despite having no previous first-class experience, Creary was selected to play for the senior West Indies A team in a first-class game against the touring Bangladeshis. Shortly after, he was unexpectedly named in the West Indies' 15-man squad for its two-Test series against Bangladesh. His selection was due to an ongoing player strike, and he was not selected for either match.

Creary was named captain of the West Indian team at the 2010 Under-19 World Cup in New Zealand, with Yannick Ottley as his vice-captain. He missed his team's final group-stage match against Papua New Guinea due to a groin injury, but returned for the finals, scoring 52 against England and 41 against Pakistan in addition to an earlier 55 against Bangladesh. After the World Cup, Creary was selected in the inaugural intake for the West Indies High Performance Centre (HPC). He was originally selected in the HPC squad for the 2010–11 WICB Cup, but hip surgery meant he was unable to take part. He was also selected in the squad for the following season's competition, but did not play a game.
