= Creary =

Creary is a surname. Notable people with the surname include:

- Andre Creary (born 1990), Jamaican cricketer
- Mitch Creary (born 1976), Australian rugby league footballer

== See also ==
- Cleary (surname)
- Crear
- McCreary
