= Paul Wintz =

Guyanese cricketer (born 1986)

Personal information
- Full name: Paul Gordon Wintz
- Born: 7 March 1986 (age 40); Cumberland, Guyana
- Batting: Right-handed
- Bowling: Right-arm fast-medium

Domestic team information
- Years: Team
- 2010–2017: Guyana
- 2015-2016: Guyana Amazon Warriors

Career statistics
Competition	FC	LA	T20
Matches	3	21	4
Runs scored	66	81	–
Batting average	16.50	16.20	–
100s/50s	0/1	0/0	–
Top score	50	38*	–
Balls bowled	199	891	72
Wickets	2	34	2
Bowling average	61.00	20.35	47.50
5 wickets in innings	0	0	0
10 wickets in match	0	0	0
Best bowling	2/50	3/15	2/11
Catches/stumpings	0/0	6/0	1/0
- Source: CricketArchive, 5 March 2017

Paul Gordon Wintz (born 7 March 1986) is a Guyanese cricketer who has played for the Guyanese national side in West Indian domestic cricket, and also for the Guyana Amazon Warriors franchise in the Caribbean Premier League (CPL). He is a right-arm fast-medium bowler.

Wintz was born in Cumberland Village, in Guyana's East Berbice-Corentyne region. He made his senior debut for Guyana at the 2010 Champions League Twenty20 in India, playing matches against the Mumbai Indians and South Australia. Wintz made his List A debut for Guyana during the 2011–12 Regional Super50, and his first-class debut during the 2012–13 Regional Four Day Competition. At the 2012–13 Regional Super50, he took eight wickets from six matches, behind only Ronsford Beaton for Guyana.
