= 2010–11 WICB Cup =

Cricket tournament

- Administrator(s): West Indies Cricket Board
- Cricket format: List A cricket
- Tournament format(s): Group stage and knockout
- Champions: Barbados (shared); Leeward Islands (shared)
- Participants: 8
- Matches: 15
- Most runs: 188 – Wilden Cornwall (Leeward Islands)
- Most wickets: 14 – Ryan Hinds (Barbados)

The 2010–11 WICB Cup was the 37th domestic List A cricket tournament held in the West Indies, it took place from 14 October 2010 – 24 October 2010. The eight teams were divided into two groups with the top two from each group advancing to the semi-finals. Barbados and the Leeward Islands shared the title after the final match ended in a tie.

Wilden Cornwall of the Leeward Islands was the tournament's top run-scorer with 188. The highest wicket-taker was the Barbados player Ryan Hinds who took 14.

== Group stage ==
=== Group A ===
Team	Pld	W	L	T	N/R	Pts
Windward Islands	3	3	0	0	0	13
Jamaica	3	1	1	0	1	7
Trinidad and Tobago	3	1	1	0	1	6
Combined Campuses and Colleges	3	0	3	0	0	0
Source:Cricinfo

=== Group B ===
Team	Pld	W	L	T	N/R	Pts
Barbados	3	2	0	0	1	11
Leeward Islands	3	1	1	0	1	6
Guyana	3	1	2	0	0	4
Sagicor High Performance Centre	3	0	1	0	2	0
Source:Cricinfo

== Semi-finals ==
21 October 2010
Scorecard

Leeward Islands; 213 (49 overs)	v	Windward Islands; 209/9 (50 overs)
Chesney Hughes 81 (105); Darren Sammy 4/47 (10 overs)		Lindon James 64 (87); Anthony Martin 3/23 (10 overs)

Leeward Islands won by 4 runs
Sabina Park, Kingston, Jamaica
Umpires: Norman Malcolm and Peter Nero
Player of the match: Anthony Martin (Leeward Islands)

- Leeward Islands won the toss and elected to bat.

22 October 2010
Scorecard

Barbados; 249/9 (50 overs)	v	Jamaica; 191 (44.1 overs)
Jonathan Carter 59 (57); Andre Russell 6/45 (10 overs)		Brendan Nash 52 (93); Ryan Hinds 4/19 (9.1 overs)

Barbados won by 58 runs
Sabina Park, Kingston, Jamaica
Umpires: Nigel Duguid and Clyde Duncan
Player of the match: Andre Russell (Jamaica)

- Jamaica won the toss and elected to field.

== Final ==
24 October 2010
Scorecard

Leeward Islands; 139 (32.5 overs)	v	Barbados; 139 (38 overs)
Wilden Cornwall 43 (49); Tino Best 4/28 (6.5 overs)		Kirk Edwards 44 (90); Lionel Baker 5/33 (10 overs)

Match tied
Sabina Park, Kingston, Jamaica
Umpires: Norman Malcolm and Peter Nero
Player of the match: Lionel Baker (Leeward Islands)

- Leeward Islands won the toss and elected to bat.
