= Leslie Creery =

Anglican priest in Ireland

Leslie Creery (4 November 1783 – 16 January 1849) was an Anglican priest in Ireland during the 19th century.

Creery was born in County Armagh and educated at Trinity College, Dublin. The Rector of Billy, County Antrim he was Archdeacon of Connor from 1836 until his death.
