= Keddy Lesporis =

St Lucian cricketer (born 1988)

Personal information
- Full name: Keddy Lesporis
- Born: 27 December 1988 (age 37); Saint Lucia
- Batting: Right handed
- Bowling: Right-arm off spin

Domestic team information
- Years: Team
- 2007/08: Saint Lucia
- 2008/09–2016/17: Windward Islands
- 2014–2016: Saint Lucia Kings

Career statistics
Competition	FC	LA	T20
Matches	46	16	32
Runs scored	1,736	388	482
Batting average	21.17	29.84	20.95
100s/50s	0/8	1/1	0/2
Top score	86	100*	50*
Catches/stumpings	45/–	8/–	15/–
- Source: ESPNCricinfo, 31 July 2025

Keddy Lesporis (born 27 December 1988) is a Saint Lucian former cricketer who played as a top-order batsman for the Windward Islands cricket team. He also played for the Sagicor High Performance Centre, St Lucia, and the St Lucia Zouks. Lesporis batted right handed and bowled right-arm off spin. He comes from a fishing town called Laboire.

Lesporis launched a line of merchandise in 2019. He claims that every for every sale he will date 0.25 USD to help "young men and women from Saint Lucia access the tools, books and training that will help them develop the skills and mind frame to remain ‘Kl at the Crease’ of life."
