= Everest Cricket Club Ground =

Cricket ground in Georgetown, Guyana

- Interactive map of Everest Cricket Club Ground

Ground information
- Location: Georgetown, Guyana
- Country: Guyana
- Coordinates: 6.8235°N 58.1561°W
- Establishment: 1928

Team information
Guyana	(1996/97–2005/06)
- As of 16 February 2022; Source: Ground profile

Everest Cricket Club Ground is a cricket ground in Georgetown, Guyana.

== History ==
The ground was established in 1928, when the Everest Cricket Club relocated from their original Queenstown ground and acquired a lease on what was swampy land located a short distance from the ocean. The swampy land was quickly transformed into a cricket ground with a sizeable pavilion, with the ground being formally opened on 30 April 1928 by the Governor of British Guiana Cecil Hunter-Rodwell The ground was due to host its inaugural first-class match in the 1996–97 Red Stripe Cup between Guyana and Jamaica, but the match was abandoned. Therefore, the inaugural first-class match played there was between Guyana and a touring England XI in February 1998; since that match, a further four first-class matches were played at the ground, three of which hosted the touring South Africans, Indians and Australians. In addition to hosting first-class matches, the ground also hosted nine List A one-day matches between 1998 and 2011, mostly in the capacity of a neutral venue in the West Indian domestic one-day tournament. During the 2007 Cricket World Cup, the ground was one of two practice venues in Guyana. The ground was one of the venues for the 2022 ICC Under-19 Cricket World Cup, hosting two matches.

== Records ==
=== First-class ===
- Highest team total: 402 for 6 by Carib Beer XI v Australians, 2002–03
- Lowest team total: 118 all out by Guyana Board President's XI v Indians, 2001–02
- Highest individual innings: 141 not out by Narsingh Deonarine for Carib Beer XI v Australians, 2002–03
- Best bowling in an innings: 7-71 by Neil McGarrell for Guyana v England XI, 1997–98
- Best bowling in a match: 11-101 by Robert Croft for England XI v Guyana, as above

=== List A ===
- Highest team total: 367 for 4 by Leeward Islands v Canada, 2008–09
- Lowest team total: 127 all out by United States v Combined Campuses and Colleges, 2008–09
- Highest individual innings: 147 by Chris Gayle for Jamaica v Combined Campuses and Colleges, 2011–12
- Best bowling in an innings: 6-26 by Kavesh Kantasingh for Combined Campuses and Colleges v Leeward Islands, 2011–12

== See also ==
- List of cricket grounds in the West Indies
