= Creer =

Creer is a surname. Notable people with the surname include:

- Allan Creer (born 1986), Scottish footballer
- Joseph Creer (1832–1913), Manx-born Australian politician

== See also ==
- Center for Radiofrequency Electronics Research of Quebec (Centre de Recherche en Electronique Radiofréquence)
- CreER^{T2}, a modified estrogen receptor engineered for tamoxifen-induced gene expression
