= Steve Crear =

Australia international rugby league footballer

Playing information
- Position: Wing, Centre, Five-eighth
Club
Years	Team	Pld	T	G	FG	P
19??–??	Rockhapmton
19??–??	Redcliffe	42	4	0	0	12
19??–??	Wests (Brisbane)
19??–??	Gatton
	Total	42	4	0	0	12
Representative
Years	Team	Pld	T	G	FG	P
1971–78	Queensland	10	1	0	0	3
1977	Australia	0	0	0	0	0
	Central Queensland

Steve Crear is an Australian former professional rugby league footballer who played in the 1970s and 1980s. A Queensland state and Australian national representative back, he played his club football in the Brisbane Rugby League for Western Suburbs and Redcliffe, as well as elsewhere in Queensland for Rockhampton and Gatton.

In 1971 Crear was first selected to represent Queensland against New South Wales.

Crear played at centre for Western Suburbs in the 1976 Brisbane Rugby League Premiership's Grand final victory over Eastern Suburbs.

Crear was selected for the Australian team's 1977 Rugby League World Cup campaign, becoming Kangaroo No. 500, but did not play any games. Also in 1977 Crear received the Western Suburbs club's Annual Old Boys Best & Fairest Award.

In 1981 Crear captained the Central Queensland team in the Datsun Country Championships.

In 2008, the centenary year of rugby league in Australia, Crear was named at five-eighth of Queensland Rugby League Central Division's team of the century.
