= Jacques Taylor =

West Indian cricketer (born 1988)

Personal information
- Full name: Jacques David Chesney Taylor
- Born: 19 April 1988 (age 38); Saint Kitts
- Batting: Right-handed
- Bowling: Right-arm off spin

Domestic team information
- Years: Team
- 2011–present: Leeward Islands

Career statistics
Competition	FC	LA	T20
Matches	22	9	5
Runs scored	536	87	70
Batting average	15.76	14.50	23.33
100s/50s	0/3	0/0	0/0
Top score	72	22	41
Balls bowled	2133	304	54
Wickets	21	9	2
Bowling average	56.23	26.66	46.50
5 wickets in innings	0	0	0
10 wickets in match	0	0	0
Best bowling	3/70	4/46	1/26
Catches/stumpings	13/0	0/0	1/0
- Source: CricInfo, 20 January 2022

Jacques David Chesney Taylor (born 19 April 1988) is a Kittitian cricketer who plays for the Leeward Islands in West Indian domestic cricket. He is a right-handed all-rounder who bowls off spin.

Before making his debut for the Leewards, Taylor played for the Saint Kitts national side at the 2006 and 2008 Stanford 20/20 competitions, which held full Twenty20 status. He was 18 at the time of his debut. A former Leewards under-19s player, Taylor made his senior debut for the team during the 2010–11 WICB Cup, a limited-overs tournament. His first-class debut came a few months, in the 2010–11 Regional Four Day Competition. Taylor made his maiden first-class half-century in just his third match, making 63 against the Windward Islands. Taylor also played the role of cricketer Vivian Richards in the Bollywood film 83. Taylor also worked as a coach in San Ramon for a cricket league called as SRCA.
