= Darren Bravo =

West Indian cricketer

Personal information
- Full name: Darren Michael Bravo
- Born: 6 February 1989 (age 37); Santa Cruz, Trinidad and Tobago
- Batting: Left-handed
- Bowling: Right arm medium
- Role: Batsman
- Relatives: Dwayne Bravo (half-brother)

International information
- National side: West Indies (2009–2022)
- Test debut (cap 287): 15 November 2010 v Sri Lanka
- Last Test: 11 December 2020 v New Zealand
- ODI debut (cap 146): 26 June 2009 v India
- Last ODI: 11 February 2022 v India
- ODI shirt no.: 46
- T20I debut (cap 41): 28 February 2010 v Zimbabwe
- Last T20I: 29 January 2022 v England

Domestic team information
- Years: Team
- 2006/07–2023/24: Trinidad and Tobago
- 2011: Nottinghamshire
- 2013–2021: Trinbago Knight Riders (squad no. 46)
- 2017: Kolkata Knight Riders (squad no. 46)
- 2017: Comilla Victorians
- 2018: Multan Sultans (squad no. 46)
- 2022: St Kitts & Nevis Patriots

Career statistics
Competition	Test	ODI	FC	LA
Matches	56	122	110	200
Runs scored	3,538	3,109	6,481	6,195
Batting average	36.47	30.18	35.80	38.47
100s/50s	8/17	4/18	14/35	9/42
Top score	218	124	218	139*
Balls bowled	6	–	461	1
Wickets	0	–	8	0
Bowling average	–	–	29.87	–
5 wickets in innings	–	–	0	–
10 wickets in match	–	–	0	–
Best bowling	–	–	2/18	–
Catches/stumpings	51/–	35/–	101/–	59/–
Medal record
Men's Cricket
Representing West Indies
ICC Men's T20 World Cup
Winner	2012 Sri Lanka
- Source: ESPNcricinfo, 26 January 2025

Darren Michael Bravo (born 6 February 1989) is a Trinidadian cricketer who has played international cricket for the West Indies. A left-handed batsman, his batting style has drawn comparisons with Brian Lara. Bravo is the younger half brother of fellow West Indies cricketer Dwayne Bravo and his mother is the first cousin of former cricketer Brian Lara. Bravo was a member of the West Indies team that won the 2012 T20 World Cup.

== Career ==
Bravo made his first team debut for Trinidad and Tobago in January 2007 and scored seven in a one-day match against Guyana. He made his first-class debut three days later against the Leeward Islands and scored eight. After another single figure score in his next match against the Windward Islands, he made no further appearances in the 2006/07 season. He returned to the under-19 team for the TCL Under-19 Challenge and finished the tournament as leading run scorer, in five matches scoring 419 runs at an average of 59.85.

In preparation for the 2008 Under-19 World Cup, the West Indies under-19s competed in the 2007–08 KFC Cup. Bravo played for the side in two matches; the first saw his team dismissed for a one-day record low total of 18, and Bravo was one of six players who was dismissed without scoring. Bravo described it as a learning experience, saying: "Collins was getting a lot of movement and Edwards was bowling very fast. It was difficult to get them away but the experience was good for us and it came in handy in the other games." At the under-19 World Cup, Bravo played in all five of West Indies matches scoring 165 runs at 55. In the plate final against Nepal, he took three wickets for nine runs (3/9) and scored 24 not out, in helping the Windies clinch an eventual victory. Bravo finished the 2007/08 season with two first-class matches but failed to score a substantial innings with a best of 29.

In October 2008, Bravo was a member of the Trinidad and Tobago squad for the Stanford Series. Having failed to play in the first match against the Super Stars he came into the side for the next match against Middlesex and scored 27 not out including hitting the winning runs with a six over long-on. His domestic form in the 2008–09 season was much improved from the previous season; in the WICB Cup which Trinidad and Tobago won, he scored 41 in the semi-final run chase against Jamaica and added 20 in the final against Barbados. In first-class cricket, he scored 97 against Barbados, in a team score of 264, he was the last man out after 330 minutes of batting. Later in January 2009, he scored a maiden first-class century against the Windward Islands; his innings of 105 included 13 fours and a six. The form led to his selection for West Indies A; however, an injury meant he missed the fixture against the England tourists. On his return to first-class cricket, Bravo scored a second century of the season; against Barbados, he added 111 and shared a 250 run partnership for the fourth wicket with Kieron Pollard. In the following match against Jamaica, he scored 41 and 70 also equalling a Trinidad and Tobago record by taking five catches in the second innings. Older half brother, Dwayne praised his form, saying: "He had been good with the bat and I am happy to see that he has been very consistent this season". Darren failed to pass 30 in his final four matches but still ended the season with 605 runs at 43.21.

=== International breakthrough ===
In June 2009, Bravo was called up to the West Indies squad for the first two ODIs of the series with India. He made his international debut in the first ODI at Sabina Park scoring 19 from 16 balls, including two fours from the first two deliveries he faced. On his Test debut against Sri Lanka, Bravo scored 58 from 159 balls. He went on to hit 80 in the second Test and 68 in the third Test to help him get a tour average of 68.66.

In February 2011, Bravo was named in West Indies' 15 man squad for the 2011 Cricket World Cup.

The West Indies first engagement after the 2011 World Cup was hosting Pakistan at home. In the two-Test series, Bravo was the only West Indies batsman to score over 100 runs. In October 2011, the West Indies toured Bangladesh. After contributing scores of 2 and 24 not out in the drawn first Test, Bravo scored his maiden Test century in the second to help his team to a 1–0 series victory. The innings of 195 from 297 balls was the ninth highest score by a West Indian batsman in the subcontinent. For his performances in 2011, he was named in the World Test XI by the ESPNcricinfo.

He also joined up with English county cricket side Nottinghamshire for the 2011 County Championship season. Bravo went on to average 35.42 for Nottinghampshire with two fifties from four first class games.

Though Bravo was bought by the Deccan Chargers for $100,000 at the 2012 Indian Premier League auction, he missed the competition because it clashed with Australia's tour of the West Indies in March and April 2012. After scoring just 48 runs in the five-match ODI series, Bravo was dropped for the T20Is against the same opponent so he could return to domestic cricket to find form ahead of the Test series. With 184 runs in three Tests, Bravo was the West Indies' second-highest run-scorer in the series behind Shivnarine Chanderpaul and sixth overall.

In December 2013, Bravo scored 218, his maiden test double-century, to help the West Indies to an unlikely draw in the first match of the 2013/14 Test series against New Zealand at the Dunedin. Bravo's 218 is the highest score by a west Indian in a follow-on innings. He also became the seventh batsman to score a double hundred in a follow on and the first to do so since VVS Laxman in 2001. In June 2014 Bravo won the accolade of Cricketer of the Year at the WIPA/WICB Awards for the 2013 season. In August 2014, Bravo put up a 258 run partnership with Denesh Ramdin against Bangladesh at the Warner Park Sporting Complex in Basseterre, St. Kitts. The pair thus set the record for the highest 3rd wicket partnership in ODI history.

In January 2015, Bravo was named in West Indies' original 15 man squad for the 2015 Cricket World Cup but he was later forced to withdraw himself from the tournament due to an injury.

Bravo's seventh Test hundred came in the first Test of the Australia tour of 2015–16, in Bellerive Oval, Hobart. He scored 108 off 177 balls in the first innings and eventually lost the match by an innings.

Bravo is the first batsman in history to score a Test century in the fourth innings of a Day/Night Test match when he scored 116 against Pakistan in October 2016. He was also the first ever left-handed batsman to have scored a Test hundred in an innings of a Day/Night Test match.

In April 2019, Bravo was named in the West Indies' squad for the 2019 Cricket World Cup. He was offered a recall to the Test side for the two match series against England in 2020, but declined the offer to play in a country with high rates of coronavirus with players having to live for weeks in a secure bubble.

On 14 March 2021, against Sri Lanka in the third ODI, Bravo scored his first ODI half-century since June 2016, scoring 102 off 132 deliveries. He also crossed 3000 ODI runs in the match. In September 2021, Bravo was named as one of four reserve players in the West Indies' squad for the 2021 ICC Men's T20 World Cup.

== Domestic career ==
In September 2017, Bravo was draft picked by the Comilla Victorians for the upcoming BPL season. In February 2018, Bravo joined the Multan Sultans in their debut PSL season. On 3 June 2018, Bravo was selected to play for the Winnipeg Hawks in the players' draft for the inaugural edition of the Global T20 Canada tournament. Bravo later joined the St Kitts and Nevis Patriots in 2022, after playing for the Trinbago Knight Riders since the CPL's inaugural season in 2013.

In January 2020, Bravo was named the new captain of the Trinidad and Tobago Red Force, steering the side to the runner-up spot for the 2020 West Indies Championship. T&T Spinner Imran Khan eventually replaced him and led the team to fourth place in the follow-up season of the competition. Bravo eventually returned as the Red Force's captain for the 2023 season of the West Indies Championship. He thereafter scored a century in each innings in a draw against the Leeward Islands Hurricanes at the Sir Vivian Richards Stadium in North Sound, Antigua.
