= Wilden Cornwall =

West Indian cricketer (born 1973)

Wilden Cornwall (born 29 April 1973 in Antigua) is a West Indian cricket player. He represents the Leeward Islands and Antigua and Barbuda in West Indian domestic cricket. He represented Antigua and Barbuda in the cricket tournament at the 1998 Commonwealth Games.
