= Anthony Martin (cricketer) =

West Indian cricketer

Personal information
- Full name: Anthony Martin
- Born: 18 November 1982 (age 43); Bethesda, Antigua
- Batting: Right-handed
- Bowling: Legbreak
- Role: Bowler

International information
- National side: West Indies
- ODI debut (cap 159): 25 April 2011 v Pakistan
- Last ODI: 11 December 2011 v India
- Only T20I (cap 54): 11 October 2011 v Bangladesh

Domestic team information
- Years: Team
- 2008-present: Leeward Islands
- 2006-08: Antigua and Barbuda (Stanford 20/20)
- 2013–present: Antigua Hawksbills

Career statistics
| Competition | ODI | FC | LA | T20 |
|---|---|---|---|---|
| Matches | 9 | 29 | 25 | 8 |
| Runs scored | 10 | 198 | 37 | 0 |
| Batting average | - | 6.82 | 7.40 | 0.00 |
| 100s/50s | 0/0 | 0/0 | 0/0 | 0/0 |
| Top score | 4* | 42 | 13 | 0* |
| Balls bowled | 318 | 5902 | 1166 | 178 |
| Wickets | 11 | 94 | 29 | 5 |
| Bowling average | 26.90 | 27.61 | 26.20 | 36.20 |
| 5 wickets in innings | 0 | 4 | 0 | 0 |
| 10 wickets in match | 0 | 1 | 0 | 0 |
| Best bowling | 4/36 | 7/81 | 4/36 | 2/26 |
| Catches/stumpings | 3/- | 16/- | 12/- | 1/- |
- Source: Cricinfo, 9 October 2011

Anthony Martin (born 18 November 1982, Bethesda, Antigua and Barbuda on the island of Antigua) is a West Indian cricketer. He has been an impressive first-class cricketer, and has represented the West Indies national cricket team in One Day International matches. He had been a fast bowler in his Under-15 days, but he injured his back in an accident and he could not bowl fast any more. He reverted to offspin but his Under-19 coach said he had to change his style due to their already having two established offspinners. He therefore changed to legspin.

== Career ==
Anthony Martin, a legspin bowler, made his domestic debut for the Leeward Islands in 2008 and had a solid, if not spectacular record over four seasons. He first came to prominence in the 2010–11 WICB Cup where his hat-trick in the semi-final put Leeward Islands into the final. He also had the best economy rate of 2.82 in the competition. As a result of his performances, he was selected in West Indies's preliminary 30-man squad for the 2011 Cricket World Cup, but eventually did not make it to the final squad.

The decision to axe both Sulieman Benn and Nikita Miller after the World Cup finally brought about his One Day International debut against the Pakistan national cricket team. He made his debut on 25 April 2011 in the second match of the five-match ODI series, at the Beausejour Cricket Grounds at Gros Islet Quarter, Saint Lucia. Pakistan won the match by 7 wickets.

The next series against India went very well for Martin. In the 4th ODI, the West Indies defeated the Indians by 103 runs. Anthony Martin was the man of the match for his spectacular performance when he took bowling figures of 4/36 in 10 overs. By the process, Martin's bowling figures became the fourth best bowling performance by a West Indian bowler against India in ODIs since 2005.

After the match, he was interviewed for his brilliant four-wicket haul in his just 5th One-Day International. In one of the most delighting interviews of the tour (described so by Cricinfo), Martin said,"No one comes here and destroy me on my pitch (Antigua). This is my pitch. I don't care who they are. I am here to destroy whoever I play against. I am so glad that I did it against India, the world champions."

He also revealed the incident that had given him the confidence that he could play international cricket. He was bowling for Antigua XI in a practice match against India in 2006. Indian batsman Rahul Dravid hit his first delivery for a boundary and the next delivery he was out, caught in the slips. Martin thought if he could get Dravid, he could someday also play international cricket. He also took Virender Sehwag's catch in the match.

Martin has been selected for West Indies's limited-overs squad in their tour of Bangladesh in 2011/12.

The first match of the tour was a lone Twenty20 played at the Sher-e-Bangla Cricket Stadium, Mirpur, Dhaka. As the Bangladesh national cricket team scored a shocking victory over the favorites West Indies, Martin finished with one wicket. He took the wicket of Bangladeshi opener Imrul Kayes, caught by Danza Hyatt, just when the opening pair was looking quite troublesome. He also took two catches, of Mohammad Ashraful caught off the bowling of Marlon Samuels and of Alak Kapali, caught off Carlos Brathwaite. It was Brathwaite's first international wicket.

He also represented West Indies in the One-Day International series, but not in the Test series.

In the next series against India, he was selected as usual in the limited-overs squads, in which Sunil Narine and Jason Mohammed were also surprise selections.

== Personal life ==
Apart from playing cricket for the West Indies as a legbreak bowler, he also works in a small fire station in the All Saints neighbourhood, Antigua. He had joined them in 2002, at the age of 20 and has been listed on the red shift. Sergeant Harry said about him,"He handles himself well in emergency situations. He is usually jumping around and excited, but during an emergency he knows what to do and does it well".
