= Ravi Rampaul =

Trinidadian cricketer (born 1984)

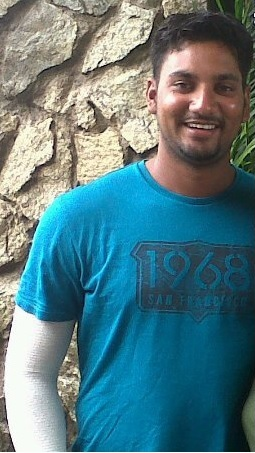

Personal information
- Full name: Ravindranath Rampaul
- Born: 15 October 1984 (age 42); Preysal, Trinidad and Tobago
- Height: 1.83 m (6 ft 0 in)
- Batting: Left-handed
- Bowling: Right arm fast medium
- Role: Bowler

International information
- National side: West Indies (2009–2021)
- Test debut (cap 282): 26 November 2009 v Australia
- Last Test: 13 November 2012 v Bangladesh
- ODI debut (cap 118): 22 November 2003 v Zimbabwe
- Last ODI: 7 November 2015 v Sri Lanka
- ODI shirt no.: 14
- T20I debut (cap 13): 28 June 2007 v England
- Last T20I: 4 November 2021 v Sri Lanka
- T20I shirt no.: 14

Domestic team information
- Years: Team
- 2001–2017: Trinidad and Tobago
- 2008: Ireland
- 2013–2014: Royal Challengers Bangalore
- 2014–2017: Barbados Tridents
- 2016–2017: Surrey
- 2017–2019: Derbyshire
- 2021–2022: Trinbago Knight Riders
- 2021: Colombo Stars

Career statistics
Competition	Test	ODI	T20I	FC
Matches	18	92	27	92
Runs scored	335	362	15	1,317
Batting average	14.56	12.48	7.50	12.91
100s/50s	0/0	0/1	0/0	0/2
Top score	40*	86*	8	64*
Balls bowled	3,440	4,033	575	14,800
Wickets	49	117	31	274
Bowling average	34.79	29.35	25.90	29.78
5 wickets in innings	0	2	0	11
10 wickets in match	0	0	0	1
Best bowling	4/48	5/49	3/16	7/51
Catches/stumpings	3/–	14/–	2/–	25/–
Medal record
Men's Cricket
Representing West Indies
ICC Men's T20 World Cup
Winner	2012 Sri Lanka
- Source: ESPNcricinfo, 4 November 2021

Ravindranath Rampaul (born 15 October 1984) is a former Trinidadian cricketer who plays as a pace bowler. He's played for the West Indies, Trinidad and Tobago and IPL side Royal Challengers Bangalore. Rampaul has also featured for CPL outfits Barbados Tridents and Trinbago Knight Riders along with English County cricket teams Surrey and Derbyshire. Rampaul was a notable member of the Windies side that won the 2012 T20 World Cup.

== Youth cricket ==
Rampaul played youth cricket for West Indies and Trinidad and Tobago, playing at the World Under-15 Challenge in England in 2000, and at the 2002 Under-19 World Cup, before breaking the record wicket tally in the regional youth tournament in West Indies after taking 45 wickets in five matches during the 2002 tournament. The following season, he took 27 wickets, as Trinidad and Tobago won their first youth title since 1987. By that time, however, he had also made his first-class debut, playing three Busta Cup matches for Trinidad and Tobago during the 2001–02 season and taking six wickets.

== International career ==
After playing six further matches during the 2002–03 season, and taking 18 wickets, with only Marlon Black taking more for Trinidad and Tobago that season, Rampaul was selected for West Indies Under-19s in the 2003–04 Red Stripe Bowl one-day tournament. Rampaul was leading wicket-taker for the U-19 team, as his eight wickets was double that of any other, and after the tournament completed, Rampaul was called up to represent West Indies in their tour of Zimbabwe in October and November.

Rampaul went wicketless in his first game, sending down 13 no-balls in 30 overs, and was not selected for either of the two Test matches. However, after taking two wickets, including opener Dion Ebrahim, in the one-day warm-up match against Zimbabwe A, Rampaul played in four of the five ODIs. He failed to take a wicket in the series, which West Indies eventually claimed 3–2 with a win in the final game, and Rampaul was the most expensive West Indian bowler among those bowling more than four overs per game,

Rampaul also went to the South African leg of the tour, and recorded his first five-wicket-haul in first-class cricket, taking five of the first six wickets in a tour match against Free State. They were 86 for six after West Indies had posted 618, and Rampaul ended with figures of five for 55. Rampaul played all three tour games, but once again was left out of the Test matches. After "impressing" in a one-day tour match against South Africa A, he was left out of the team for the first ODI, but replaced Vasbert Drakes for the second match. Rampaul picked up the wicket of Jacques Kallis for 16, and contributed 24 runs, as West Indies lost by 16 runs. He removed Kallis again in the final ODI, when West Indies nearly leveled the 5-match series to 2 games apiece. Kallis though, in scoring 135, helped the South Africans to a 3-2 series triumph. Rampaul's figures of 2-56 from his 10 overs, was lauded as a "marvellous late effort"

After once again playing in the Under-19 World Cup, taking nine wickets as West Indies reached the final but ultimately lost to Pakistan, Rampaul played in all five ODIs against England at home, taking four wickets but once again being the most expensive of the regular bowlers. Between 1 October 1998 and 14 July 2006 only Tino Best conceded more wides and no-balls per ten overs in ODIs for the West Indies.

=== Injury problems ===
Rampaul was selected in a 13-man squad to play the first home Test against Bangladesh, but was not selected to play, and one month later, he was struck with injury. He had played three matches during the 2004 NatWest Series. He later picked up two wickets, Geraint Jones and Andrew Strauss, for 34 in a seven-wicket win over England. However due to a shin injury he took no further part in the series, and flew home before the Test matches.

Rampaul returned to cricket when he turned up in Trinidad league cricket in February 2005, and represented Trinidad and Tobago again during the 2005–06 KFC Cup in October, where he played four matches and was Trinidad and Tobago's leading wicket-taker along with Samuel Badree. However, Rampaul sustained a leg injury, and did not play any games during the first-class Carib Beer Series, which his team won.

=== Return from injury ===
In July 2006, Rampaul was awarded a cricket scholarship by the Australian High Commissioner to Trinidad and Tobago, and attended coaching sessions in Australia.

Rampaul became Ireland's overseas player for the 2008 Friends Provident Trophy. He helped them win their first FP Trophy game for two years against Warwickshire. In six matches for Ireland Rampaul took 10 wickets at an average of 28.70, with best bowling figures of 3/40.

Pakistan toured the West Indies in April and May 2011 for a T20I, five ODIs, and two Tests. Osman Samiuddin remarked that during the Tests Rampaul "ran in precisely with the enthusiasm of a man unable to believe how his career has suddenly soared, racing in so the dream doesn't suddenly end". Rampaul was the West Indies leading wicket-taker in the two test series, with eleven dismissals at an average of 20.90. India began a tour of the West Indies in June. Rampaul was fined 10 per cent of his match fee for the first Test for questioning the umpire's decision when he was given out. He eventually earned ten wickets in the three-match test series at an average of 24.90.

A shoulder injury in March prevented Rampaul from playing domestic cricket for Trinidad and Tobago; a bout of dengue fever the same month prevented him from playing in the ODI series against Australia. He began club cricket towards the end of the month and hoped to represent Trinidad and Tobago to prove his fitness to the national selectors. At last Rampaul was included in the team for the third and final Test after an injury to fellow fast bowler Fidel Edwards.

In September 2021, Rampaul was named in the West Indies' squad for the 2021 ICC Men's T20 World Cup.

=== County cricket ===
During March 2016 Rampaul signed a two-year contract to play for Surrey County Cricket. On his debut for the side, he picked up 5 for 93, at Trent Bridge against Nottinghamshire in the English County Championship. Rampaul was a member of the Surrey side which reached the final of the 2017 Royal London One Day Cup. In October 2017, Rampaul joined Derbyshire, in a three-year deal.

== Bowling style ==
In 2004, at the age of 19, Rampaul was regularly bowling in excess of 81 miles per hour (130 km/h) and by 2011 the usual pace of his deliveries was pushing 90 miles per hour (145 km/h). Rampaul is well known for his swing bowling, in the words of ESPNcricinfo's Daniel Brettig, "Sending the ball down at brisk pace, Rampaul maintains an immaculate seam position, maximising his chances of early deviation through the air or off the pitch".
