= Peter Nero (umpire) =

Trinidad and Tobago cricket umpire (born 1964)

Personal information
- Full name: Peter John Nero
- Born: 27 June 1964 (age 62); Toco, Trinidad and Tobago
- Role: Umpire

Umpiring information
- ODIs umpired: 22 (2011–2014)
- T20Is umpired: 12 (2011–2014)
- WT20Is umpired: 16 (2011–2015)
- FC umpired: 28 (2008–present)
- LA umpired: 22 (2007–present)
- Source: CricketArchive, 28 June 2012

Peter John Nero (born 27 June 1964) is a cricket umpire from Trinidad and Tobago.

== Umpiring career ==
Nero made his List A-cricket debut as an umpire in 2007, and his first-class umpiring debut the year after. He officiated in his first One Day international (ODI) and Twenty20 International (T20I) in 2011.

== See also ==
- List of One Day International cricket umpires
- List of Twenty20 International cricket umpires
