= Norman Malcolm (umpire) =

Jamaican cricket umpire

Personal information
- Full name: Norman Alexander Malcolm
- Born: 19 May 1955 (age 71); Manchester, Jamaica
- Role: Umpire

Umpiring information
- ODIs umpired: 27 (2007–2011)
- T20Is umpired: 7 (2009–2011)
- WODIs umpired: 4 (2013)
- FC umpired: 51 (1994–present)
- LA umpired: 96 (1993–2011)
- Source: CricketArchive, 26 June 2012

Norman Alexander Malcolm (born 19 March 1955) is a Jamaican cricket umpire.

== Umpiring career ==
Malcolm made his list A cricket umpiring debut in 1993, making his first-class cricket debut the following year. By 2011, he had stood in 34 international fixtures, including 27 One Day Internationals.

== See also ==
- List of One Day International cricket umpires
- List of Twenty20 International cricket umpires
