= William Perkins (West Indian cricketer) =

West Indian cricketer (born 1986)

Personal information
- Full name: William Keith Donald Perkins
- Born: 8 October 1986 (age 40); Barbados
- Batting: Left-handed
- Role: Batsman, Wicket-keeper

International information
- National side: West Indies

Domestic team information
- Years: Team
- 2006–2011: Trinidad and Tobago
- 2011–: Combined Campuses and Colleges
- 2013–present: Trinbago Knight Riders

Career statistics
Competition	FC	LA	T20I	T20
Matches	5	5	1	12
Runs scored	243	52	9	337
Batting average	24.30	10.40	9.00	33.70
100s/50s	0/1	0/0	0/0	0/3
Top score	52	26	9	56
Catches/stumpings	3/0	3/1	1/0	2/0
- Source: CricketArchive, 29 November 2008

William Perkins (born 8 October 1986) is a West Indian cricketer. He is a right-handed batsman who occasionally plays as wicketkeeper.

Perkins first came to prominence playing for the West Indies in the 2006 Under-19 Cricket World Cup, where he scored 133 from 150 balls in a victory against the United States, an innings that won him the man of the match award. His performances in the tournament earned him a Twenty20 debut for Trinidad and Tobago in the Stanford 20/20 tournament. In his first match, he scored 53 from 28 balls in an eight-wicket win. He subsequently made his first-class debut in January 2007.

Continued domestic success in Twenty20 cricket – in his first nine games, he averaged more than 40 at a strike rate of over 125 – earned him a place in the West Indies team for a Twenty20 International against Australia. Opening the innings in a match shortened to eleven overs per side, he scored 9 in a seven-wicket victory.

Having helped Trinidad and Tobago to victory in the Stanford 20/20, scoring an unbeaten half-century in the final, Perkins was included in the initial squad for the team to face England in the Stanford Super Series for a collective prize of $20 million and attended a training camp, but did not make the final squad.
