= Lionel Baker =

West Indian cricketer

Personal information
- Full name: Lionel Sionne Baker
- Born: 6 September 1984 (age 42); Montserrat
- Batting: Left-handed
- Bowling: Right-arm fast-medium
- Role: Bowler

International information
- National side: West Indies
- Test debut (cap 271): 11 December 2008 v New Zealand
- Last Test: 14 May 2009 v England
- ODI debut (cap 145): 12 November 2008 v Pakistan
- Last ODI: 26 June 2009 v India
- ODI shirt no.: 44

Domestic team information
- Years: Team
- 2000–2013: Montserrat
- 2004/05–2013/14: Leeward Islands

Career statistics
Competition	Test	ODI	FC	LA
Matches	4	10	37	42
Runs scored	23	13	422	188
Batting average	11.50	6.50	10.29	14.46
100s/50s	0/0	0/0	0/0	0/0
Top score	17	11*	37	31*
Balls bowled	660	426	5,073	1,834
Wickets	5	11	94	49
Bowling average	79.00	32.27	30.70	31.75
5 wickets in innings	0	0	3	1
10 wickets in match	0	0	1	0
Best bowling	2/39	3/47	8/31	5/33
Catches/stumpings	1/–	1/–	14/–	10/–
- Source: Cricinfo, 11 May 2022

Lionel Sionne Baker (born 6 September 1984) is a West Indian former cricketer who has played first-class cricket for the Leeward Islands. He is the first person from Montserrat to have represented the West Indies at Test cricket.

== Personal life ==
Although he was born in Montserrat, Lionel Baker spent several years living in London and attended school there.

== Domestic career ==
Baker made his debut for the Leeward Islands in the 2004/05 season.

In 2007 Baker, played for an English Village club side called Marston Green Cricket Club and broke their long standing batting record, scoring 207 against Aston Unity on 27 August. Baker scored 819 runs, and took 27 wickets in this season. Baker, took a shine to the local Chinese takeaway, and regularly ate shrimps for his post match snack.

In the 2008 English season, Baker represented Walmley in the Birmingham and District Premier League. After impressing in the nets in 2008, Baker signed a two-year contract with Leicestershire County Cricket Club to represent them from 2009. He has a British passport which would have allowed him to play without counting as an overseas or Kolpak player. However, a month later the deal fell through once Baker was selected for the West Indies team as he was no longer eligible to play as a Kolpak player.

Baker has represented Montserrat in the Stanford 20/20 since the 2006 season and was selected in the Stanford Superstars squad in 2008 to play against England, but did not play for them.

== International career ==
Baker represented the West Indies at U19 level, he finished his Youth One Day International career with 17 wickets from 8 matches at an average of 18.47 with best bowling figures of 6/39. The figures of 6/39 earned Baker a man-of-the-match award and were taken against Sri Lanka U19s.

On 1 November 2008, the ODI squad to tour Pakistan was announced, with Baker as one of the members. On the same day, it was announced that he was one of four players – along with Brendan Nash, Leon Johnson, and Kemar Roach – without a Test cap to be named in the 15-man squad selected to tour New Zealand for a Test series. He became the first player from Montserrat to represent the West Indies senior side at international level when he made his One Day International (ODI) debut against Pakistan on 12 November 2008. His first wicket in international cricket was that of Salman Butt, bowled. He did not bat and after coming on to bowl first change, finished the match with bowling figures of 9–0–47–3, also claiming the scalps of Younis Khan and Shahid Afridi as the West Indies narrowly lost by four wickets.

Baker made his Test debut on 11 December 2008, playing against New Zealand.
