= Marlon Samuels =

Jamaican cricketer (born 1981)

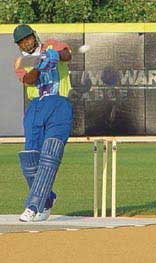
- Samuels playing for Chicago Tornadoes in 2004

Personal information
- Full name: Marlon Nathaniel Samuels
- Born: 5 February 1981 (age 45); Kingston, Jamaica
- Batting: Right-handed
- Bowling: Right-arm off break
- Role: Top-order batsman
- Relatives: Robert Samuels (brother)

International information
- National side: West Indies (2000–2018)
- Test debut (cap 237): 15 December 2000 v Australia
- Last Test: 30 October 2016 v Pakistan
- ODI debut (cap 103): 4 October 2000 v Sri Lanka
- Last ODI: 14 December 2018 v Bangladesh
- ODI shirt no.: 7 (previously 52)
- T20I debut (cap 15): 28 June 2007 v England
- Last T20I: 5 August 2018 v Bangladesh
- T20I shirt no.: 7 (previously 52)

Domestic team information
- Years: Team
- 1996/97–2013/14: Jamaica
- 2011/12: Duronto Rajshahi
- 2012–2013: Pune Warriors India
- 2012/13: Melbourne Renegades
- 2013–2014: Antigua Hawksbills
- 2015: St Kitts and Nevis Patriots
- 2015–2017: Comilla Victorians
- 2016/17–2017/18: Leeward Islands
- 2017: Peshawar Zalmi
- 2017: Delhi Daredevils (squad no. 77)
- 2017: St Lucia Stars

Career statistics
Competition	Test	ODI	T20I	FC
Matches	71	207	67	122
Runs scored	3,917	5,606	1,611	7,295
Batting average	32.64	32.97	29.29	36.65
100s/50s	7/24	10/30	0/10	14/40
Top score	260	133*	89*	260
Balls bowled	4,392	5,091	479	7,432
Wickets	41	89	22	71
Bowling average	59.63	46.37	28.27	55.05
5 wickets in innings	0	0	0	1
10 wickets in match	0	0	0	0
Best bowling	4/13	3/12	3/23	5/87
Catches/stumpings	28/–	50/–	12/–	68/–
Medal record
Men's Cricket
Representing West Indies
ICC Champions Trophy
Runner-up	2006 India
ICC Men's T20 World Cup
Winner	2012 Sri Lanka
Winner	2016 India
- Source: ESPNcricinfo, 14 December 2018

Marlon Nathaniel Samuels (born 5 February 1981) is a Jamaican former cricketer who played internationally for the West Indies in all three formats, and a former ODI captain. He is a right-handed middle order batsman and off-spinner. He was a key member of the West Indies team that won the 2012 ICC World Twenty20 and 2016 ICC World Twenty20, and was named man of the match in the final of both tournaments, becoming the first, and to-date the only, man to achieve the feat.

Samuels made his Test debut in Australia in 2000, and his One Day International debut against Sri Lanka in Nairobi during the ICC Knockout Trophy the same year.

In 2013 he was named one of the Wisden Cricketers of the Year. He was one of the franchise players for the inaugural Caribbean Premier League. In 2016 the West Indies Cricket Board named Samuels as the ODI Player of the Year and the Cricketer of the Year.

On 4 November 2020, Samuels announced his retirement from professional cricket. He had already informed CWI about his retirement in June 2020.

== Personal life ==
Samuels was born in Kingston to parents Philip and Daphne. He has seven siblings; four brothers and three sisters. He is also the younger brother of Robert Samuels, a former cricketer who played for the Windies. Additionally, he attended Kingston College and soon became a member of the Melbourne Cricket Club.

== Domestic career ==
During the West Indies tour of Australia, on 9 October 2005, Samuels registered his highest first-class score, an innings of 257. It was made in a tour match against Queensland at the Gabba. His effort was a record score at the ground, beating Martin Love's 250. Showing his allround abilities, he followed it up with 5 wickets in the next innings.

The Bangladesh Cricket Board founded the six-team Bangladesh Premier League in 2012, a twenty20 tournament to be held in February that year. An auction was held for teams to buy players, and Samuels was bought by the Duronto Rajshahi for $360,000. He was the team's highest run-scorer with 242 from 11 innings in the competition. In February 2012, Samuels signed a contract with Pune Warriors India to play for them in the 2012 and 2013 Indian Premier League (IPL). The 2012 IPL clashed with Australia's tour of the West Indies, and Samuels was granted permission to skip the three-Test series and play in the league. During the tournament, he was reported for having a suspect bowling action, and was suspended from bowling for the rest of the competition.

In October 2012, Samuels was selected for the Melbourne Renegades in the 2012/2013 Big Bash T20 League.

Samuels helped Peshawar Zalmi win the 2017 Pakistan Super League, and Kowloon Cantons to win the 2017 Hong Kong T20 Blitz. Despite his then recent success, he was not selected until the 8th round of the 2017 Caribbean Premier League draft, when he was picked by the St Lucia Stars.

== International career ==
=== Debut years ===
Samuels first played for the Windies at two successive U19 Cricket World Cups. During the West Indies' 2000 tour of Australia, Samuels scored 60 not out and 46 at the Melbourne Cricket Ground, in his second Test match. He went on to score his maiden Test hundred at Kolkata against the Indians in 2002/03. His innings of 104 helped the West Indies to draw the third Test and was made against the likes of Javagal Srinath, Anil Kumble and Harbhajan Singh. His first ODI century came in the series which followed and turned out to be a series winning innings. With the series level at 3–3 going into the final match at Vijayawada on 24 November 2002, Samuels struck an unbeaten 108 from 75 balls. The West Indies finished with a total of 315/6 and won the match by 135 runs.

He played in two Tests on the tour of Australia in 2005, with a highest score of 29, before he was sent home with a knee injury.

=== Permanent member ===
Against Pakistan at Multan in late 2006, Samuels scored his second ODI century. His unbeaten 100 led the West Indies to victory as they successfully chased the Pakistani total. He fell just short of another century a month later against the Indians in Chennai but his quick fire 98 helped his side chase down India's 268. Samuels was involved in the run-out of Brian Lara in his last international match, against England during the 2007 World Cup. Lara was on 18, when Samuels signalled for a quick run but was unable to reach the other wicket in time as Kevin Pietersen underarmed the ball to hit the stumps. After the World Cup, the West Indies toured England in May. Unexpectedly Samuels was not initially included in the squad for the Test leg, but was called up as a replacement when Ramnaresh Sarwan suffered an injury. On 4 July Samuels made 77 runs from 104 balls against England in the second Natwest ODI. He and Shivnarine Chanderpaul scored a record third wicket partnership of 175 runs at Edgbaston in a game West Indies won.

In December 2007, Samuels was named man of the match after scoring 94 and 40 in the first Test against South Africa in Port Elizabeth, a match the West Indies won by 128 runs. He went on to score his second Test hundred, in the final match, hitting 105 although it wasn't enough for his side to win the match or the series.

=== Ban in 2008 ===
On 25 February 2008 Samuels was suspended from bowling in international cricket until he corrects his bowling action, which has been deemed suspect. Indian police accused Samuels of giving out team information to a known bookie prior to the 1st ODI between the West Indies and India in Nagpur on 21 January 2007. It was claimed that they have taped telephone conversations between a bookmaker, Mukesh Kochchar, and Samuels. The transcript was later released by the police. After a hearing into the matter, in May the International Cricket Council enforced a two-year ban on the 27-year-old for "receiving money, or benefit or other reward that could bring him or the game of cricket into disrepute". Samuels maintained his innocence.

=== Return in 2010 ===
Samuels' two-year ban expired on 9 May 2010, and he subsequently returned to playing for Jamaica. West-Indian chief selector Clyde Butts stated that the door was open for Samuels to serve the Windies in international cricket provided that he proved himself on the domestic circuit. During the 2011 World Cup in February and March, all-rounder Dwayne Bravo suffered an injury and the West Indies Cricket Board asked Samuels to fly out to act as a replacement. Samuels declined, stating that he did not yet feel ready, but that he was targeting a return during India's tour of the West Indies in June and July.

The West Indians were knocked out from the quarter-finals of the World Cup, and in the team's first engagement after was hosting Pakistan in April and May. When the T20I squad was announced, four uncapped players were included and Samuels was recalled, marking a return to the squad for the first time since the expiration of his ban. Samuels returned to the Test side for the second Test and scored a half-century in his first innings.

=== Golden years ===
Samuels was selected in the West Indies Test squad to tour England after the IPL. In the first Test Samuels combined with Chanderpaul in a 157-run stand. However, with England batting on the final day to win the match Samuels was asked to bowl. His part-time off spin was called upon as the West Indies had entered the match without a specialist spinner, while Shannon Gabriel was injured and Fidel Edwards ineffective. Samuels scored his third Test century in his next innings, and combined with captain Darren Sammy to score 204 runs, the second-highest partnership for the West Indies' seventh wicket.

Samuels was named man of the match in the final of the 2012 ICC World Twenty20, in which the West Indies beat Sri Lanka by 36 runs to claim the title. He scored 78 off 56 balls, an innings which included six sixes and three fours. For his performances in 2012, he was named in the Test XI and T20I XI of the year by ESPNcricinfo.

During the pool match against Zimbabwe in 2015 Cricket World Cup, Samuels scored his 8th ODI century. He along with Chris Gayle scored record breaking 372 run for the second wicket, which is the highest ever partnership for any wicket in ODIs. In the match, Gayle recorded first double century in World Cup history as well.

Samuels was also named man of the match in the final of the 2016 ICC World Twenty20 in which he scored an unbeaten 85 off 66 balls to help West Indies beat England by 4 wickets and capture their second World Twenty20 title. Samuels was later named as the 2016 West Indies' ODI Player of the Year and Cricketer of the Year.

=== Illegal bowling & drop from squad ===
During the first test at Galle in 2015, Samuels was again reported about suspect bowling action. The action was found to be illegal for the second time and Samuels was banned from bowling in international arena for 12 months. His bowling action was cleared on 16 February 2017 by the ICC with the permitted 15-degree limit.

On 4 November 2016, Samuels was dropped from the ODI squad for 2016–17 Zimbabwe Tri-Series due to poor performances in tests against Pakistan in October.

=== Return in 2017 ===
On 24 February 2017, Samuels discussed with WICB about the omission him from West Indies squad and suggested he could accept a Kolpak deal in county cricket. However, on 21 August 2017, WICB took the decision to include Samuels along with Gayle to return ODIs for the series against England.

=== Corruption charges ===
In September 2021, Samuels was charged with breaching the ICC anti-corruption code, for his time playing in the Abu Dhabi T10 in 2019. In August 2023, Samuels was found guilty of four anti-corruption charges under the Emirates Cricket Board Anti-Corruption Code. In November 2023, Samuels was banned from all forms of cricket for six years.

== Controversy ==
Samuels was involved in a controversy during the Melbourne derby on 6 January 2012 against the Shane Warne-led Melbourne Stars; during the Stars' innings, Samuels held back David Hussey at the non-striker's end when the batters were trying to take a second run off Samuels' bowling. Warne reacted angrily to this when he was later bowling to Samuels himself swearing and cursing; he continuously sledged Samuels, asking if he was going "grab hold of my shirt too, Marlon?" The incident escalated when Warne threw a cricket ball on Samuels, who responded by throwing his bat away. This led to an angry confrontation between the two mid-pitch. Both players were suspended, but Samuels missed the rest of the BBL season in any case, as he received an injury due to a bouncer from Lasith Malinga in the same game. The pair have been far from kind about each other in interviews since this incident.

Samuels also has something of a feud with Ben Stokes; this began during the England cricket tour to the West Indies 2014–15. In the Second Test match, in which Samuels scored a century, he mocked Stokes' attempts to distract him with sledging as he batted, saying that it only concentrated his mind on the job in hand. When Stokes was then dismissed for 8 on Day 3 of the same match, Samuels saluted the departing batsman.

The feud resurfaced during the final of the 2016 ICC World Twenty20, during which Samuels scored a crucial 85. Stokes bowled the final over of the match to Carlos Brathwaite, with Samuels at the non-striker's end. After Brathwaite hit 4 sixes to win the game for the West Indies, Samuels claimed that Stokes "never learns".

Tensions again arose between Samuels and Stokes in 2020; Stokes, who had been forced to quarantine while visiting his family in New Zealand during the COVID-19 pandemic, later joked that the experience of isolation had been so tough "he wouldn't wish it on his worst enemy" – when asked if he included Samuels in that statement, he responded "no, it's that bad". Samuels responded on his social media with an expletive-laden post referencing Stokes' wife, which drew a negative response from many in the cricketing world. Among those to respond was Shane Warne, who told Samuels that he "needs serious help". Samuels again took to social media to respond, mocking Warne for having plastic surgery.

== Accolades ==
Samuels features along with eighteen other cricketers upon a mural at Sabina Park which aims to illustrate the spirit of Jamaican cricket.

== List of international centuries ==
Samuels has scored seven centuries in Test matches and ten in One Day Internationals. His highest Test score of 260 came against Bangladesh at Sheikh Abu Naser Stadium, Khulna in November 2012 and his highest ODI score of 133* came against Zimbabwe at Manuka Oval, Canberra in February 2015.

Key
Symbol	Meaning
*	Remained not out
†	Man of the match
Match	Matches played
Pos.	Position in the batting order
Inn.	The innings of the match
Test	The number of the Test match played in that series
S/R	Strike rate during the innings
H/A/N	Venue was at home (West Indies), away or neutral
Date	Date the match was held, or the starting date of match for Test matches
Lost	The match was lost by West Indies
Won	The match was won by West Indies
Drawn	The match was drawn

=== Test international centuries ===
List of Test centuries scored by Marlon Samuels
No.	Score	Against	Pos.	Inn.	Test	Venue	H/A/N	Date	Result	Ref
1	104	India	7	2	3/3	(India) Eden Gardens, Kolkata	Away	30 October 2002	Drawn	
2	121	South Africa	4	3	3/3	(South Africa) Sahara Stadium Kingsmead, Durban	Away	10 January 2008	Lost	
3	144	England	6	1	2/3	(England) Trent Bridge, Nottingham	Away	25 May 2012	Lost	
4	123 †	New Zealand	4	2	2/2	(Jamaica) Sabina Park, Kingston	Home	2 August 2012	Won	
5	260 †	Bangladesh	4	2	2/2	(Bangladesh) Sheikh Abu Naser Stadium, Khulna	Away	21 November 2012	Won	
6	101	South Africa	4	2	2/3	(South Africa) St George's Park Cricket Ground, Port Elizabeth	Away	26 December 2014	Drawn	
7	103	England	4	1	2/3	(Grenada) National Cricket Stadium, St. George's	Home	21 April 2015	Lost	

=== One Day International centuries ===
List of ODI centuries scored by Marlon Samuels
No.	Score	Against	Pos.	Inn.	S/R	Venue	H/A/N	Date	Result	Ref
1	108 †	India	5	1	144.00	(India) Indira Gandhi Stadium, Vijayawada	Away	24 November 2002	Won	
2	100* †	Pakistan	4	2	101.01	(Pakistan) Multan Cricket Stadium, Multan	Away	13 December 2006	Won	
3	101* †	New Zealand	4	1	98.06	(Jamaica) Sabina Park, Kingston	Home	7 July 2012	Won	
4	126 †	Bangladesh	3	2	84.56	(Bangladesh) Sher-e-Bangla National Cricket Stadium, Mirpur	Away	5 December 2012	Won	
5	106* †	Pakistan	4	1	101.92	(Saint Lucia) Darren Sammy Cricket Ground, Gros Islet	Home	21 July 2013	Won	
6	126* †	India	4	1	108.62	(India) Kaloor Stadium, Kochi	Away	8 October 2014	Won	
7	112	India	4	2	105.66	(India) Himachal Pradesh Cricket Association Stadium, Dharamsala	Away	17 October 2014	Lost	
8	133*	Zimbabwe	3	1	85.26	(Australia) Manuka Oval, Canberra	Neutral	24 February 2015	Won	
9	110* †	Sri Lanka	5	1	115.79	(Sri Lanka) Pallekele International Cricket Stadium, Pallekele	Away	7 November 2015	Lost	
10	125 †	Australia	4	1	93.28	(Barbados) Kensington Oval, Bridgetown	Home	21 June 2016	Lost	

== Other ventures ==
In 2020, Samuels launched his first fragrance, named Sextillion. Since 2013, he has also supported blind charities in the Caribbean, especially in his native Jamaica, through the Marlon Samuels Foundation. He hopes that he will be able to adapt the focus of the foundation's work towards fighting breast cancer in the near future. As his career has wound down, Samuels has also begun to focus on the music industry; he has released songs to his YouTube channel under the stage-name Icon7.

== Records ==
- With Kane Williamson he shares the record for the highest individual score in an ICC World T20 final (85). Samuels also holds the record for the highest score in a successful chase in an ICC World T20 final.
- Highest ever ODI partnership for any wicket, along with Gayle – 372 runs for second wicket and also it is the highest stand for any wicket in World Cup history.
