= Kirk Edwards =

West Indian cricketer

Personal information
- Full name: Kirk Anton Edwards
- Born: 3 November 1984 (age 42); Barbados
- Batting: Right-handed
- Bowling: Right-arm off break
- Role: Batsman

International information
- National side: West Indies
- Test debut (cap 291): 6 July 2011 v India
- Last Test: 13 September 2014 v Bangladesh
- ODI debut (cap 158): 11 July 2011 v India
- Last ODI: 22 August 2014 v Bangladesh
- ODI shirt no.: 30

Domestic team information
- Years: Team
- 2005/06–2014/15: Barbados
- 2008/09: Combined Campuses and Colleges
- 2015/16: Jamaica
- 2017/18–2019/20: Windward Islands

Career statistics
Competition	Test	ODI	FC	LA
Matches	17	16	99	87
Runs scored	986	331	5,447	1,864
Batting average	31.80	33.33	33.41	24.85
100s/50s	2/8	1/0	10/33	3/7
Top score	121	123*	190	147
Balls bowled	24	–	24	–
Wickets	0	–	0	–
Bowling average	–	–	–	–
5 wickets in innings	–	–	–	–
10 wickets in match	–	–	–	–
Best bowling	–	–	–	–
Catches/stumpings	15/–	2/–	58/–	26/–
- Source: ESPNcricinfo, 12 March 2020

Kirk Anton Edwards (born 3 November 1984) is a West Indies former international cricketer. He played as a right-handed batsman, domestically mainly for Barbados.

== Domestic career ==
In May 2018, he was selected to play for the Windward Islands national cricket team in the Professional Cricket League draft, ahead of the 2018–19 season. In October 2019, he was named as the captain of the Windward Islands for the 2019–20 Regional Super50 tournament.

== International career ==
Edwards made his Test debut for the West Indies against India at Windsor Park in Dominica in July 2011. He scored 110 runs in the second innings making him the first person to score a Test century at Windsor Park and the 13th West Indies cricketer to score a century on Test debut. In 2008, Edwards coached at Phoenix Cricket Club in Ireland. Edwards played his club cricket in Barbados for Maple Cricket Club, where he led the team in the Twenty20 Club Champions League 2009 tournament in Trinidad. In 2010, Edwards moved to Wanderers Cricket Club.
