= Ronsford Beaton =

Guyanese cricketer

Personal information
- Full name: Ronsford Rodwick Beaton
- Born: 17 September 1992 (age 34); Montserrat
- Batting: Right-handed
- Bowling: Right-arm fast

International information
- National side: West Indies
- ODI debut (cap 182): 20 December 2017 v New Zealand
- Last ODI: 23 December 2017 v New Zealand
- ODI shirt no.: 79

Domestic team information
- Years: Team
- 2011–2016: Guyana
- 2014–2015: Guyana Amazon Warriors
- 2016: Dhaka Dynamites
- 2017-present: Trinbago Knight Riders

Career statistics
Competition	ODI	FC	T20
Matches	2	33	48
Runs scored	15	211	40
Batting average	15.00	7.03	13.33
100s/50s	0/0	0/0	0/0
Top score	12*	30*	13*
Balls bowled	102	4206	1,000
Wickets	1	64	42
Bowling average	102.00	33.01	34.04
5 wickets in innings	0	1	0
10 wickets in match	0	0	0
Best bowling	1/60	5/43	4/9
Catches/stumpings	0/0	18/0	15/0
- Source: , 9 October 2021

Ronsford Rodwick Beaton (born 17 September 1992) is a Guyanese cricketer who plays for the Guyanese national side in West Indian domestic cricket, and also for the Trinbago Knight Riders franchise in the Caribbean Premier League (CPL). He is a right-arm fast bowler.

== Domestic career ==
Beaton was born on the island of Montserrat, but moved to Guyana as a child, and was raised in the village of Reliance, in the Pomeroon-Supenaam region. He attended high school in Georgetown, at the Abram Zuil Secondary School, and later went on to the Guyana School of Agriculture. Beaton played for the West Indies under-19s at the 2012 Under-19 World Cup in Australia, and finished third in his team's wicket-taking. He had made his first-class debut for Guyana the previous year, during the 2010–11 Regional Four Day Competition. Beaton has since been a regular for Guyana in both the long and short forms of the game, as well as for his CPL franchise. He has also made several appearances for West Indies A.

For the 2018 CPL competition, he was reselected by the Trinbago Knight Riders in the 10th round of the player draft. In October 2019, he was named in Guyana's squad for the 2019–20 Regional Super50 tournament.

== International career ==
In May 2017, he was named in the West Indies' Twenty20 International (T20I) squad for their series against Afghanistan, but he did not play. In November 2017, he was named in the West Indies' One Day International (ODI) and T20I squads for their series against New Zealand. He made his ODI debut for the West Indies against New Zealand on 20 December 2017. However, he was later ruled out of the T20I squad due to injury.
