= West Indies High Performance Centre =

Cricket academy

The West Indies High Performance Centre (WIHPC or just HPC) is a cricket academy and training centre based at the 3Ws Oval on the Cave Hill, Barbados, campus of the University of the West Indies (UWI). The centre was initially sponsored by the Sagicor Financial Corporation, and known as the Sagicor High Performance Centre.

The WIHPC was officially opened in June 2010 by the Prime Minister of Barbados, David Thompson. The centre is a collaboration between the University of the West Indies and the West Indies Cricket Board (WICB), and had been planned since at least 2008, when it was announced in a statement from the WICB. The initial intake comprised fifteen West Indian players between the ages of 19 and 27.

On several occasions, matches played by the HPC have been granted first-class, List A, or Twenty20 status. An HPC team competed in the 2010–11 and 2011–12 editions of the Regional Super50 (the domestic one-day tournament), making the semi-finals of the latter. In May and June 2014, the HPC played a series against a touring Bangladesh A team, which comprised two first-class fixtures, three one-day matches, and two Twenty20 matches.
