= Fidel Edwards =

Barbadian cricketer

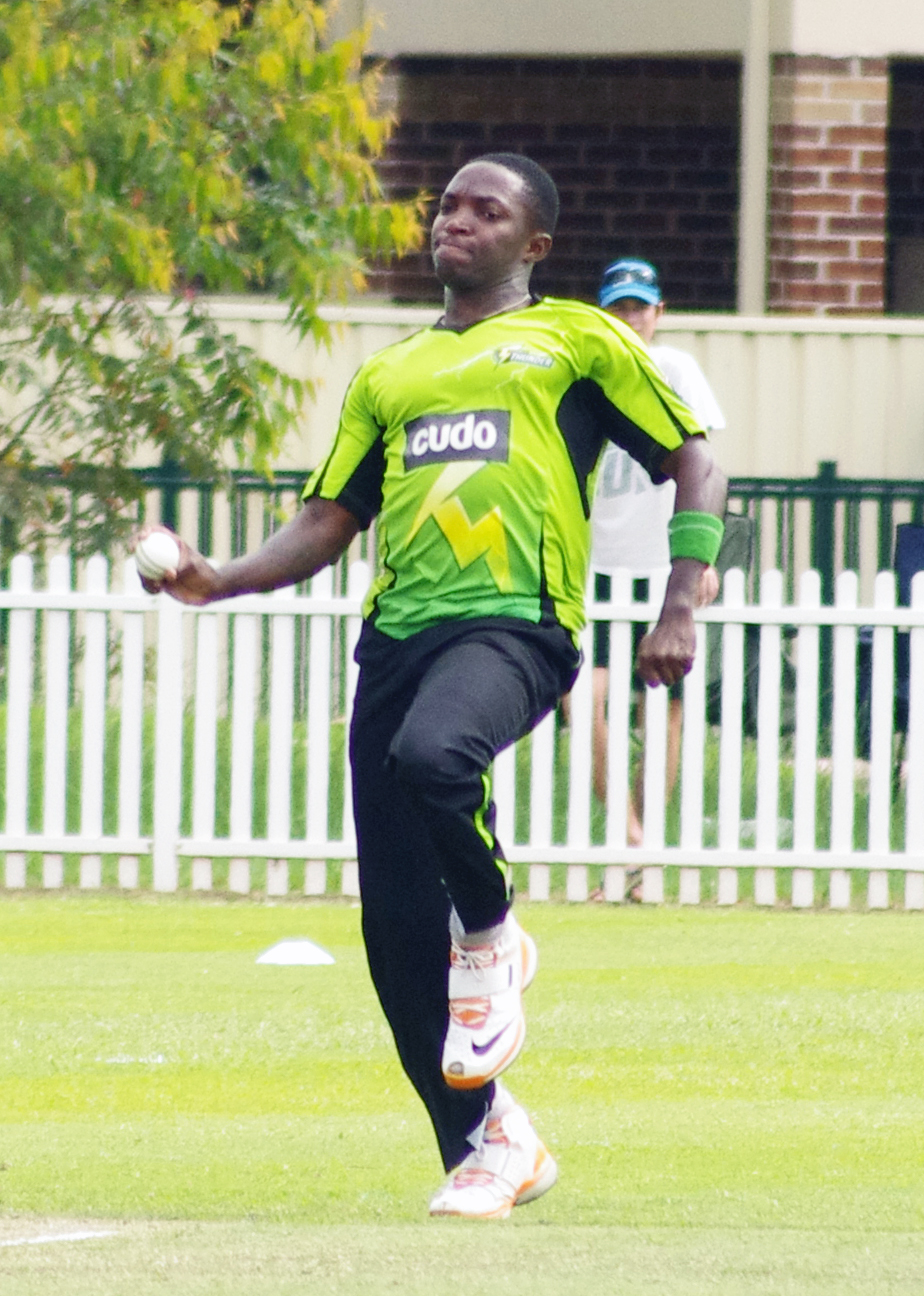
- Fidel Edwards, in Australia (2011)

Personal information
- Full name: Fidel Henderson Edwards
- Born: 6 February 1982 (age 44); St Peter, Barbados
- Nickname: Castro
- Height: 1.8 m (5 ft 11 in)
- Batting: Right-handed
- Bowling: Right arm fast
- Role: Bowler
- Relatives: Pedro Collins (half-brother)

International information
- National side: West Indies (2003–2021)
- Test debut (cap 253): 27 June 2003 v Sri Lanka
- Last Test: 21 November 2012 v Bangladesh
- ODI debut (cap 119): 29 November 2003 v Zimbabwe
- Last ODI: 26 May 2009 v England
- T20I debut (cap 19): 11 September 2007 v South Africa
- Last T20I: 10 July 2021 v Australia

Domestic team information
- Years: Team
- 2001/02–2014/15: Barbados
- 2009: Deccan Chargers
- 2011/2012: Sydney Thunder
- 2011/12: Dolphins
- 2013: Rangpur Riders
- 2013–2014: Trinidad and Tobago Red Steel
- 2015–2019: Hampshire (squad no. 20)
- 2015: St Lucia Zouks
- 2015: Sylhet Super Stars
- 2019: → Warwickshire (loan)
- 2020–2021: Jamaica Tallawahs

Career statistics
Competition	Test	ODI	T20I	FC
Matches	55	50	26	138
Runs scored	394	73	11	789
Batting average	6.56	9.12	5.50	6.80
100s/50s	0/0	0/0	0/0	0/0
Top score	30	13	7*	40
Balls bowled	9,602	2,138	438	21,530
Wickets	165	60	20	455
Bowling average	37.87	30.20	30.85	30.22
5 wickets in innings	12	2	0	27
10 wickets in match	0	0	0	2
Best bowling	7/87	6/22	3/23	7/87
Catches/stumpings	10/–	4/–	5/–	26/–
Medal record
Men's Cricket
Representing West Indies
ICC Champions Trophy
Runner-up	2006 India
ICC Men's T20 World Cup
Winner	2012 Sri Lanka
- Source: ESPNcricinfo, 10 July 2021

Fidel Henderson Edwards (born 6 February 1982) is a Barbadian cricketer, who played all formats of the game. A pace bowler, his round-arm action is "not unlike" that of former fast bowler Jeff Thomson but similar to the bowling action of Lasith Malinga of Sri Lanka. He was spotted in the nets by Brian Lara and was called up for his Test debut against Sri Lanka after just one match for Barbados. Edwards was a member of the West Indies team that won the 2012 T20 World Cup.

Despite a promising start to his Test career, he has been injury prone and inconsistent. With an average of just under 40 in Test cricket, he has struggled to fulfil his early potential.

He is the half brother of Pedro Collins.

== Domestic and T20 franchise career ==
The experienced campaigner who also plays in the Bangladesh Premier League was bought by Rajasthan Royals in players auction for IPL 2013 for US$210,000. On 6 February 2009 the IPL franchise of Deccan Chargers bought Edwards for $150,000. His club team in Barbados is YMPC.

Edwards was bought for $60,000 by Khulna Royal Bengals to play in the newly formed Bangladesh Premier League to be held in February 2012.

Edwards made his first-class debut on 1 February 2002, playing for Barbados against the Windward Islands. In the first innings he opened the bowling with Tino Best; he had to wait until the second to take his only wicket in the match, that of Junior Murray. The Barbados squad had plenty of fast bowlers, with the likes of Best, Pedro Collins, Corey Collymore, Vasbert Drakes, and Ian Bradshaw, who all had international experience by mid-2003.

On 3 June 2018, he was selected to play for the Winnipeg Hawks in the players' draft for the inaugural edition of the Global T20 Canada tournament. He was the leading wicket-taker in the tournament for the Winnipeg Hawks, with eleven dismissals in six matches. In July 2020, he was named in the Jamaica Tallawahs squad for the 2020 Caribbean Premier League.

In April 2021, he was signed by Peshawar Zalmi to play in the rescheduled matches in the 2021 Pakistan Super League.

== International career ==
=== Impressive debuts ===
Strong competition and injury meant Edwards struggled for selection. However, the selectors had monitored his development and in May that year Edwards impressed batsman Brian Lara while bowling in the nets. On the basis of the potential he showed, Edwards was included for the West Indies Test against Sri Lanka the following month. Edwards made his Test debut against Sri Lanka at Kingston, Jamaica, making 5 not out and returning with bowling figures of 5/36 and 1/54 in a winning West Indian effort. In his second first-class match, he produced the third-best bowling figures by a West Indies player on debut.

In One Day Internationals, his debut was against Zimbabwe on 29 November 2003 at Harare, taking career-best figures of 6/22 off 7 overs. As of January 2015, he is the only player to have taken 6 wickets on their ODI debut and he is only the second player after Tony Dodemaide to have taken 5 wicket hauls in both his test and ODI debuts.

=== Injuries ===
During the subsequent tour of South Africa he picked up an injury to his shins, which Edwards felt badly affected his bowling in South Africa. In four Tests against South Africa, he managed eight wickets while conceding 648 runs.

On 21 December 2008 Edwards picked up a career best 7 for 87 against New Zealand at the McLean Park in Napier. In so doing he claimed his 100th test wicket, a caught and bowled to dismiss top order batsman Tim McIntosh.

In the June 2009 ICC World Twenty20, Edwards suffered a back injury. He suffered a recurrence of the injury when he played for the Deccan Chargers in the Indian Premier League in October of that year. Consequently, his central contract was not renewed and Edwards later underwent back surgery.

=== Comeback ===
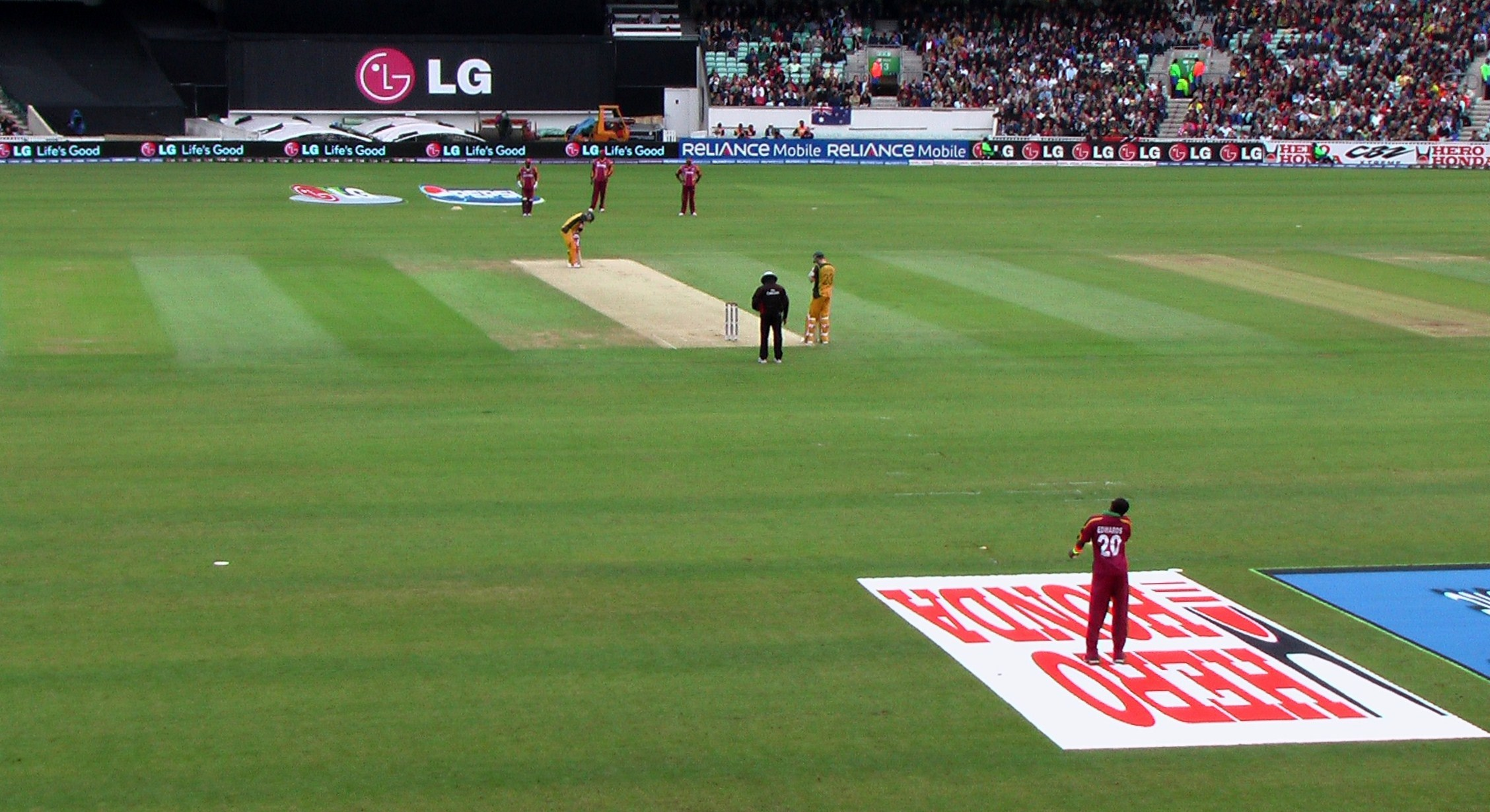
Fidel Edwards bowling against Australia, during 2009 ICC World Twenty20 tournament

In the 2010–11 West Indian cricket season, Edwards made his comeback from injury, taking 22 wickets from 6 matches for Barbados at a cost of 23.77 runs. Having proved his fitness, Edwards was called into the West Indies squad for the first Test against Pakistan in May 2011, almost two years after he was sidelined with a back injury. Though included in the squad, he had to wait until India toured in June before returning to the side. Though he was apprehensive ahead of the first Test, he troubled the Indian batsmen and took four wickets.

During the Windies' 2011 tour of India, Edwards took his 150th test wicket, dismissing Sachin Tendulkar LBW for seven, in the first match of the test series held at Delhi.

In March 2012 the West Indies Cricket Board announced that while Edwards was considered whenever Test and T20I teams were selected, he was overlooked in ODIs to manage his workload; he has not played an ODI since 2009.

Edwards last played a One Day International in 2009, and the West Indies Cricket Board manages his workload to avoid further injuring him. A back injury incurred during the 2009 ICC World Twenty20 prevented Edwards from playing international cricket until 2011.

In February 2021, Edwards made his comeback to West Indies national team after 8 years as he was named in the T20I squad for Sri Lanka series.

== Playing style ==
Discussing his round-arm bowling action in 2004, Edwards remarked "I never copied anyone, its just natural. People feel it's a very difficult action but its like riding a bicycle. And the main advantage I get bowling in that fashion is I can swing the ball more, especially the old one. Yes, at times the swing is too wide and a few more extras are added, but I am coping with that." His bowling speed is around the late 80s and early 90s mph. His fastest was clocked at 157.7 km/h in 2003.

While his statistics attest to him being a genuine tailender, Edwards has helped save the West Indies in three Test matches during his career, forming frustrating last wicket partnerships. The first instance came against Zimbabwe at Harare in 2003, where he hung in for 33 balls to deny the African nation a rare victory. In 2006, Edwards remained at the crease for 36 balls at the Antigua Recreation Ground, with India unable to claim the final wicket, while in 2009 he prevented England from a win at the same ground by remaining unbeaten on five after 26 deliveries.

== See also ==
- List of West Indies cricketers who have taken five-wicket hauls on Test debut
