= List of Wisden Trophy records =

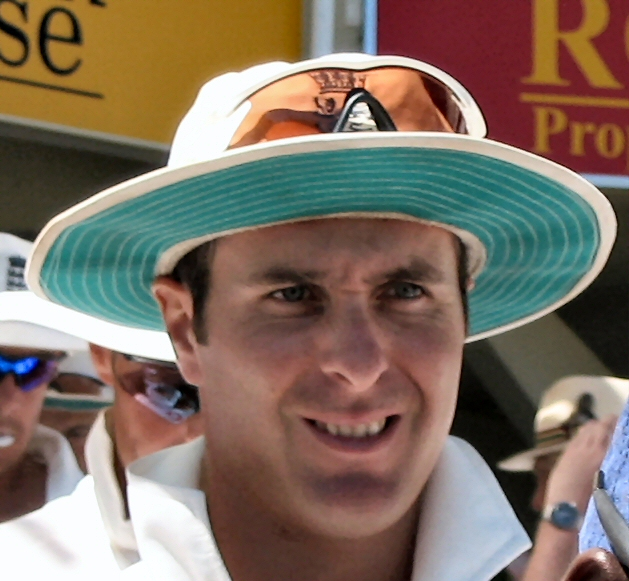
Michael Vaughan has the highest win ratio out of any captain in the Wisden Trophy winning 10 of his 11 Tests as captain.

This is a list of Wisden Trophy Test cricket series played between England and West Indies which dates back to 1963. It was usually played alternately in England and West Indies, although early series were predominantly played in England. "The Wisden Trophy" series varied between three and six Tests.

In the series' 57-year history, the trophy changed hands on seven occasions (1968, 1973, 2000, 2009 (twice), 2019 and 2020). The West Indies won the first Wisden Trophy in 1963 and held the cup until 1968. England then held the trophy for a brief period between 1968 and 1973. After the 1973 series the West Indies retained the trophy for 27 years. This included a 16-year period (1974–1990) where the West Indies did not lose a Test. The new millennium proved to be the turning point in the series as England won the 2000 Wisden Trophy 3–1 to regain the trophy after West Indies went 1–0 up. They have been largely successful against the West Indies at test-level since then, with the latter only being successful in two series since; in 2009 and 2019. To put the recent dominance by England into perspective, since the Millennium, West Indies have won only 7 Tests, to England's 23, and that was after the West Indies won the very first Test of the new Millennium at Edgbaston in 2000.

The last Wisden Trophy series took place in England in 2020 and consisted of three Test matches. The Wisden Trophy will be replaced by the Richards–Botham Trophy, named in honour of Viv Richards and Ian Botham, for future series. Overall, a total of 28 Wisden Trophy series were played, of which the West Indies won fourteen times, England won ten and there were four drawn series.

== List of Test series ==
Series	Years	Host	First match	Tests	England	West Indies	Drawn	Result	Holder	Ref
1	1963	England	6 June 1963	5	1	3	1	West Indies	West Indies	
2	1966	England	2 June 1966	5	1	3	1	West Indies	West Indies	
3	1967–68	West Indies	19 January 1968	5	1	0	4	England	England	
4	1969	England	12 June 1969	3	2	0	1	England	England	
5	1973	England	26 July 1973	3	0	2	1	West Indies	West Indies	
6	1973–74	West Indies	2 February 1974	5	1	1	3	Drawn	West Indies	
7	1976	England	3 June 1976	5	0	3	2	West Indies	West Indies	
8	1980	England	5 June 1980	5	0	1	4	West Indies	West Indies	
9	1980–81	West Indies	13 February 1981	4	0	2	2	West Indies	West Indies	
10	1984	England	14 June 1984	5	0	5	0	West Indies	West Indies	
11	1985–86	West Indies	21 February 1986	5	0	5	0	West Indies	West Indies	
12	1988	England	2 June 1988	5	0	4	1	West Indies	West Indies	
13	1989–90	West Indies	24 February 1990	4	1	2	1	West Indies	West Indies	
14	1991	England	6 June 1991	5	2	2	1	Drawn	West Indies	
15	1993–94	West Indies	19 February 1995	5	1	3	1	West Indies	West Indies	
16	1995	England	8 June 1995	6	2	2	2	Drawn	West Indies	
17	1997–98	West Indies	29 January 1998	6	1	3	2	West Indies	West Indies	
18	2000	England	15 June 2000	5	3	1	1	England	England	
19	2003–04	West Indies	11 March 2004	4	3	0	1	England	England	
20	2004	England	22 July 2004	4	4	0	0	England	England	
21	2007	England	17 May 2007	4	3	0	1	England	England	
22	2008–09	West Indies	4 February 2009	5	0	1	4	West Indies	West Indies	
23	2009	England	6 May 2009	2	2	0	0	England	England	
24	2012	England	17 May 2012	3	2	0	1	England	England	
25	2014–15	West Indies	13 April 2015	3	1	1	1	Drawn	England	
26	2017	England	17 August 2017	3	2	1	0	England	England	
27	2018–19	West Indies	23 January 2019	3	1	2	0	West Indies	West Indies	
28	2020	England	8 July 2020	3	2	1	0	England	England	

=== Results ===
Totals up to and including the 3rd Test of the 2020 series in England.
	Played	Won by England	Won by West Indies	Drawn
All Tests	120	36 (30.0%)	48 (40.0%)	36 (30.0%)
Tests in England	71	26 (36.6%)	28 (39.4%)	17 (24.0%)
Tests in West Indies	49	10 (20.4%)	20 (40.8%)	19 (38.8%)
All series	28	10 (35.7%)	14 (50.0%)	4 (14.3%)
Series in England	17	8 (47.0%)	7 (41.2%)	2 (11.8%)
Series in West Indies	11	2 (18.2%)	7 (63.6%)	2 (18.2%)

== List of captains ==
The table below is a list of cricket captains for each team in the Wisden Trophy. The list is in chronological order of appearance.

England captains					West Indies captains				
Number	Captain	Year(s)	Tests in series	Total Tests	Number	Captain	Year(s)	Tests in series	Total Tests
1	Ted Dexter	1963	1–5	5	1	Frank Worrell	1963	1–5	
2	Mike Smith	1966	1	1	2	Garry Sobers	1966, 1967–68, 1969	1–5, 1–5, 1–3	13
3	Colin Cowdrey	1966, 1967–68	2–4, 1–5	8	2	Garry Sobers	1966, 1967–68, 1969	1–5, 1–5, 1–3	13
4	Brian Close	1966	5	1	2	Garry Sobers	1966, 1967–68, 1969	1–5, 1–5, 1–3	13
5	Ray Illingworth	1969, 1973	1–3, 1–3	6	3	Rohan Kanhai	1973, 1973–74	1–3, 1–5	8
6	Mike Denness	1973–74	1–5	5	3	Rohan Kanhai	1973, 1973–74	1–3, 1–5	8
7	Tony Greig	1976	1–5	5	4	Clive Lloyd	1976, 1980, 1980–81, 1984	1–5, 1–5, 1–4, 1–5	19
8	Ian Botham	1980, 1980–81	1–5, 1–4	9	4	Clive Lloyd	1976, 1980, 1980–81, 1984	1–5, 1–5, 1–4, 1–5	19
9	David Gower	1984, 1985–86	1–5, 1–5	10	5	Viv Richards	1985–86, 1988, 1989–90, 1991	1–5, 1–5, 1 and 3–4, 1–5	18
10	Mike Gatting	1988	1	1	5	Viv Richards	1985–86, 1988, 1989–90, 1991	1–5, 1–5, 1 and 3–4, 1–5	18
11	John Emburey	1988	2–3	2	5	Viv Richards	1985–86, 1988, 1989–90, 1991	1–5, 1–5, 1 and 3–4, 1–5	18
12	Chris Cowdrey	1988	4	1	5	Viv Richards	1985–86, 1988, 1989–90, 1991	1–5, 1–5, 1 and 3–4, 1–5	18
13	Graham Gooch	1988, 1989–90, 1991	5, 1–2, 1–5	8	5	Viv Richards	1985–86, 1988, 1989–90, 1991	1–5, 1–5, 1 and 3–4, 1–5	18
14	Allan Lamb	1989–90	3–4	2	6	Desmond Haynes	1989–90	2	1
15	Michael Atherton	1993–94, 1995, 1997–98	1–5, 1–6, 1–6	17	7	Richie Richardson	1993–94, 1995	1–4, 1–6	10
15	Michael Atherton	1993–94, 1995, 1997–98	1–5, 1–6, 1–6	17	8	Courtney Walsh	1993–94	5	1
15	Michael Atherton	1993–94, 1995, 1997–98	1–5, 1–6, 1–6	17	9	Brian Lara	1997–98, 2003–04, 2004	1–6, 1–4, 1–4	14
16	Nasser Hussain	2000	1 and 3–5	4	10	Jimmy Adams	2000	1–5	5
17	Alec Stewart	2000	2	1	10	Jimmy Adams	2000	1–5	5
18	Michael Vaughan	2003–04, 2004, 2007	1–4, 1–4, 2–4	11	10	Jimmy Adams	2000	1–5	5
19	Andrew Strauss	2007, 2008–09	1 and 1–5	6	11	Ramnaresh Sarwan	2007	1	1
19	Andrew Strauss	2007, 2008–09	1 and 1–5	6	12	Daren Ganga	2007	2–4	3
19	Andrew Strauss	2007, 2008–09	1 and 1–5	6	13	Chris Gayle	2008–09	1–5	5

== Wisden Trophy records ==
=== Team records ===
Higher innings totals were scored outside The Wisden Trophy era. In the 1930 timeless Test England scored 849 on their first innings at Sabina Park. Other high scores include West Indies 681/8 declaration in 1954 at the Queen's Park Oval.

Most runs in an innings
Rank	Runs	Team	Year
1	751/5 (dec) (202 overs)	West Indies	2004
2	749/9 (dec) (194.4 overs)	West Indies	2009
3	692/8 (dec) (163 overs)	West Indies	1995
4	687/8 (dec) (182.5 overs)	West Indies	1976
5	652/8 (dec) (168.4 overs)	West Indies	1973
6	606 (143 overs)	West Indies	1984

Fewest runs in a completed innings
Rank	Runs	Team	Year
1	46 (19.1 overs)	England	1994
2	47 (25.3 overs)	West Indies	2004
3	51 (33.2 overs)	England	2009
4	54 (26.4 overs)	West Indies	2000
5	61 (26.2 overs)	West Indies	2000
6	71 (32.5 overs)	England	1976

=== Batting records ===
Brian Lara is the record holder in the Wisden Trophy for most runs with 2983 runs. Garry Sobers did make 3214 runs against England however his first 1069 runs occurred before the Wisden Trophy was established meaning he has only scored 2145 runs in the Wisden Trophy. Andy Sandham scored 325 runs against the West Indies in 1930 (which at the time was a world record) but this was before the inception of the Wisden Trophy and is therefore not a Wisden Record.

Most runs in series
Rank	Runs	Player	Period
1	2983 (51 inns.)	(Cricket West Indies) Brian Lara	1994–04
2	2969 (50 inns.)	(Cricket West Indies) Viv Richards	1976–91
3	2392 (59 inns.)	(Cricket West Indies) Desmond Haynes	1980–94
4	2318 (48 inns.)	(Cricket West Indies) Gordon Greenidge	1976–90
5	2205 (53 inns.)	(England) Geoffrey Boycott	1966–81

Highest individual score
Rank	High score	Player	Year
1	400* (582)	(Cricket West Indies) Brian Lara	2004
2	375 (538)	(Cricket West Indies) Brian Lara	1994
3	302 (430)	(Cricket West Indies) Lawrence Rowe	1974
4	291 (386)	(Cricket West Indies) Viv Richards	1976
5	291 (452)	(Cricket West Indies) Ramnaresh Sarwan	2009

Other batting feats include:

- (Cricket West Indies) Viv Richards 56 ball century in the fifth Test of the 1985–86 series is the fastest Test century (in terms of balls faced).
- (Cricket West Indies) Andy Roberts scored 25 runs in one over in the first Test of the 1980–81 series. This is the fourth most runs in a single over at Test level. The over went 46266L.

=== Bowling records ===
Sobers took 102 wickets against England, however 18 of these wickets occurred before the Wisden Trophy was instituted and therefore meant that he only took 84 wickets in Wisden Trophy matches. Alf Valentine claimed 33 wickets (from 422.3 overs) for the West Indies in the 1950 tour against England before the Wisden Trophy was established.

Most wickets
Rank	Wickets	Player	Period
1	164 (8284 balls)	(Cricket West Indies) Curtly Ambrose	1988–00
2	145 (8818 balls)	(Cricket West Indies) Courtney Walsh	1986–00
3	127 (5790 balls)	(Cricket West Indies) Malcolm Marshall	1980–91
4	100 (8841 balls)	(Cricket West Indies) Lance Gibbs	1963–74
5	96 (4486 balls)	(Cricket West Indies) Michael Holding	1976–86

Most wickets in series
Rank	Wickets	Player	Year
1	35 (203.1 overs)	(Cricket West Indies) Malcolm Marshall	1988
2	34 (220.2 overs)	(Cricket West Indies) Courtney Walsh	2000
3	34 (236.4 overs)	(England) Fred Trueman	1963
4	32 (223.5 overs)	(Cricket West Indies) Charlie Griffith	1963
5	30 (205.5 overs)	(Cricket West Indies) Curtly Ambrose	1997–98

Other bowling feats include:

- (England) Dominic Cork's hat-trick in the fourth Test of the 1995 series dismissing Richie Richardson (bowled), Junior Murray (lbw) and Carl Hooper (lbw).
- (England) Matthew Hoggard's hat-trick in the third Test of the 2003–04 series dismissing Ramnaresh Sarwan (caught), Shivnarine Chanderpaul (lbw) and Ryan Hinds (caught). The over finished 000WWW.
- (England) Andy Caddick's four-wicket over in the fourth Test of the 2000 series. This was the sixth time this had occurred at Test level. In the over he dismissed Ridley Jacobs (lbw), Nixon McLean (bowled), Curtly Ambrose (bowled) and Reon King (bowled) and the over finished W0WW0nbW.

=== Captaincy records ===
John Goddard won five Test matches as captain for West Indies but this occurred between 1948 and 1957 before the Wisden Trophy was established.

Most matches played as captain
Rank	Most Test matches	Player	Period
1	19	(Cricket West Indies) Clive Lloyd	1976–84
2	18	(Cricket West Indies) Viv Richards	1985–91
3	17	(England) Michael Atherton	1993–98
4	14	(Cricket West Indies) Brian Lara	1997–04
5	13	(Cricket West Indies) Garry Sobers	1966–69

Most wins as captain
Rank	Most wins	Player	Period
1	13 (from 18 matches)	(Cricket West Indies) Viv Richards	1985–91
2	11 (from 19 matches)	(Cricket West Indies) Clive Lloyd	1976–84
3	10 (from 11 matches)	(England) Michael Vaughan	2003–07
4	5 (from 10 matches)	(Cricket West Indies) Richie Richardson	1993–95
5	4 (from 17 matches)	(England) Michael Atherton	1993–98

== See also ==
- Cricket statistics
