= Richards–Botham Trophy =

Trophy for winners of test cricket series between England and West Indies

- Countries: England; West Indies
- Administrator: England and Wales Cricket Board; Cricket West Indies
- Format: Test cricket
- First edition: 2021–22 (West Indies)
- Latest edition: 2024 (England)
- Tournament format: Test Series
- Number of teams: 2
- Current trophy holder: England (2024)
- Most successful: West Indies; England (1 series win each)
- Most runs: (England) Joe Root (580)
- Most wickets: (England) Gus Atkinson (22)

The Richards–Botham Trophy is a trophy awarded to the winner of Test cricket series played between England and the West Indies. It is named after the former international players Viv Richards and Ian Botham, who played as rivals in West Indies–England fixtures, but were also team-mates at Somerset and good friends. The trophy replaced the Wisden Trophy, which was retired following the 2020 series between the two teams. Prior to the series, it was suggested by Andy Bull in the Guardian that a new trophy should be inaugurated in honour of West Indian cricketer Learie Constantine. Writing in the Times a week later, Mike Atherton proposed naming it the Richards–Botham Trophy instead.

In March 2021, Cricket West Indies (CWI) announced the fixtures of the first edition, to be played the following year. Winning West Indies captain, Kraigg Brathwaite, was presented with the inaugural trophy by Ricky Skerritt and Dwain Gill (CWI president) at the Grenada National Cricket Stadium on 27 March 2022. Richards and Botham had revealed the trophy design at the Sir Vivian Richards Stadium in Antigua on 7 Match, to coincide with Richards' 70th birthday.

== Background ==
England win
West Indies win
Draw

| Years | Host | Tests | England | West Indies | Drawn | Series winner | Trophy |
|---|---|---|---|---|---|---|---|
| 1928 | England | 3 | 3 | 0 | 0 | England | N/A |
| 1929–30 | West Indies | 4 | 1 | 1 | 2 | Drawn | N/A |
| 1933 | England | 3 | 2 | 0 | 1 | England | N/A |
| 1934–35 | West Indies | 4 | 1 | 2 | 1 | West Indies | N/A |
| 1939 | England | 3 | 1 | 0 | 2 | England | N/A |
| 1947–48 | West Indies | 4 | 0 | 2 | 2 | West Indies | N/A |
| 1950 | England | 4 | 1 | 3 | 0 | West Indies | N/A |
| 1953–54 | West Indies | 5 | 2 | 2 | 1 | Drawn | N/A |
| 1957 | England | 5 | 3 | 0 | 2 | England | N/A |
| 1959–60 | West Indies | 5 | 1 | 0 | 4 | England | N/A |
| 1963 | England | 5 | 1 | 3 | 1 | West Indies | Wisden Trophy |
| 1966 | England | 5 | 1 | 3 | 1 | West Indies | Wisden Trophy |
| 1967–68 | West Indies | 5 | 1 | 0 | 4 | England | Wisden Trophy |
| 1969 | England | 3 | 2 | 0 | 1 | England | Wisden Trophy |
| 1973 | England | 3 | 0 | 2 | 1 | West Indies | Wisden Trophy |
| 1973–74 | West Indies | 5 | 1 | 1 | 3 | Drawn | Wisden Trophy |
| 1976 | England | 5 | 0 | 3 | 2 | West Indies | Wisden Trophy |
| 1980 | England | 5 | 0 | 1 | 4 | West Indies | Wisden Trophy |
| 1980–81 | West Indies | 4 | 0 | 2 | 2 | West Indies | Wisden Trophy |
| 1984 | England | 5 | 0 | 5 | 0 | West Indies | Wisden Trophy |
| 1985–86 | West Indies | 5 | 0 | 5 | 0 | West Indies | Wisden Trophy |
| 1988 | England | 5 | 0 | 4 | 1 | West Indies | Wisden Trophy |
| 1989–90 | West Indies | 4 | 1 | 2 | 1 | West Indies | Wisden Trophy |
| 1991 | England | 5 | 2 | 2 | 1 | Drawn | Wisden Trophy |
| 1993–94 | West Indies | 5 | 1 | 3 | 1 | West Indies | Wisden Trophy |
| 1995 | England | 6 | 2 | 2 | 2 | Drawn | Wisden Trophy |
| 1997–98 | West Indies | 6 | 1 | 3 | 2 | West Indies | Wisden Trophy |
| 2000 | England | 5 | 3 | 1 | 1 | England | Wisden Trophy |
| 2003–04 | West Indies | 4 | 3 | 0 | 1 | England | Wisden Trophy |
| 2004 | England | 4 | 4 | 0 | 0 | England | Wisden Trophy |
| 2007 | England | 4 | 3 | 0 | 1 | England | Wisden Trophy |
| 2008–09 | West Indies | 5 | 0 | 1 | 4 | West Indies | Wisden Trophy |
| 2009 | England | 2 | 2 | 0 | 0 | England | Wisden Trophy |
| 2012 | England | 3 | 2 | 0 | 1 | England | Wisden Trophy |
| 2014–15 | West Indies | 3 | 1 | 1 | 1 | Drawn | Wisden Trophy |
| 2017 | England | 3 | 2 | 1 | 0 | England | Wisden Trophy |
| 2018–19 | West Indies | 3 | 1 | 2 | 0 | West Indies | Wisden Trophy |
| 2020 | England | 3 | 2 | 1 | 0 | England | Wisden Trophy |

== Series results ==
England win
West Indies win
Draw

| Years | Host | Tests | England | West Indies | Drawn | Result | Holder | Player of the series |
|---|---|---|---|---|---|---|---|---|
| 2021–22 | West Indies | 3 | 0 | 1 | 2 | West Indies | West Indies | (Cricket West Indies) Kraigg Brathwaite |
| 2024 | England | 3 | 3 | 0 | 0 | England | England | (England) Gus Atkinson |
| Total | | 6 | 3 | 1 | 2 | | | |

| Total Series | England | West Indies | Drawn |
|---|---|---|---|
| 2 | 1 | 1 | 0 |

== See also ==
- Benaud–Qadir Trophy
