= Wisden Trophy =

Trophy for winners of test cricket series between England and West Indies

The Wisden Trophy
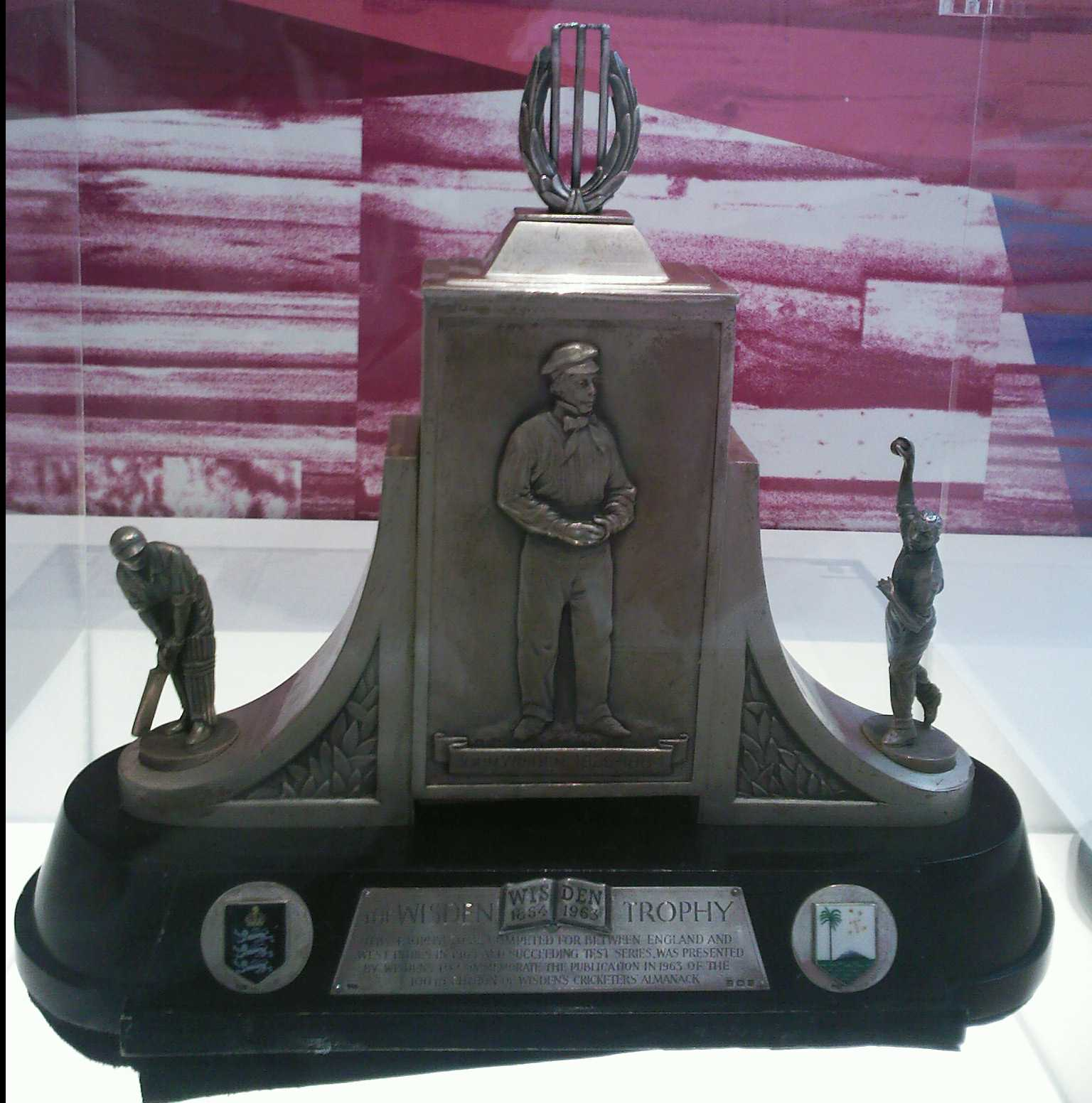
- Administrator: ECB and CWI
- Format: Test
- First edition: 1963
- Latest edition: 2020
- Tournament format: series
- Number of teams: England and West Indies
- Current trophy holder: England (10th title)
- Most successful: West Indies (14 titles)
- Most runs: (Cricket West Indies) Brian Lara (2,983)
- Most wickets: (Cricket West Indies) Curtly Ambrose (164)

The Wisden Trophy was awarded to the winner of the Test cricket series played between England and the West Indies. It was first awarded in 1963 to commemorate the hundredth edition of Wisden Cricketers' Almanack. Series were played in accordance with the future tours programme, with varying lengths of time between tours. If a series was drawn then the country holding the Wisden Trophy retained it. In 2020, it was announced that the trophy would be replaced by the Richards–Botham Trophy named after Sir Vivian Richards and Sir Ian Botham.

The trophy is named after the famous cricketing publisher Wisden and was presented by John Wisden & Co after gaining the approval of the Marylebone Cricket Club (MCC) and the West Indies Cricket Board (WICB). The Wisden Trophy was presented to the victorious team as a symbol of its victory, but then returned to the MCC Museum at Lord's. Starting with the 2000 Wisden Trophy series, the Malcolm Marshall Memorial Trophy was awarded to the leading wicket taker in the series.

England won the 2020 series, the final series in which the trophy was at stake, and thus retain it in perpetuity. England held the trophy for nine years, after beating the West Indies 3–1 in 2000, regaining it for the first time since 1969; they successfully defended the trophy three times. West Indies regained the trophy in the 2009 series in the West Indies, winning 1–0. It was originally planned to consist of four Test matches. However an extra match was arranged when the second Test had to be abandoned after only a few overs of play because the ground was unfit. England regained the trophy in May 2009, winning a two Test series 2–0. The tour, coming uncommonly soon after England toured the West Indies, replaced the previously announced tour by Sri Lanka, which in turn was arranged to replace the originally scheduled tour by Zimbabwe. England held the trophy up to and including the 2017 series in England. The West Indies won the 2019 series 2–1 on home soil.

== Inauguration and form ==
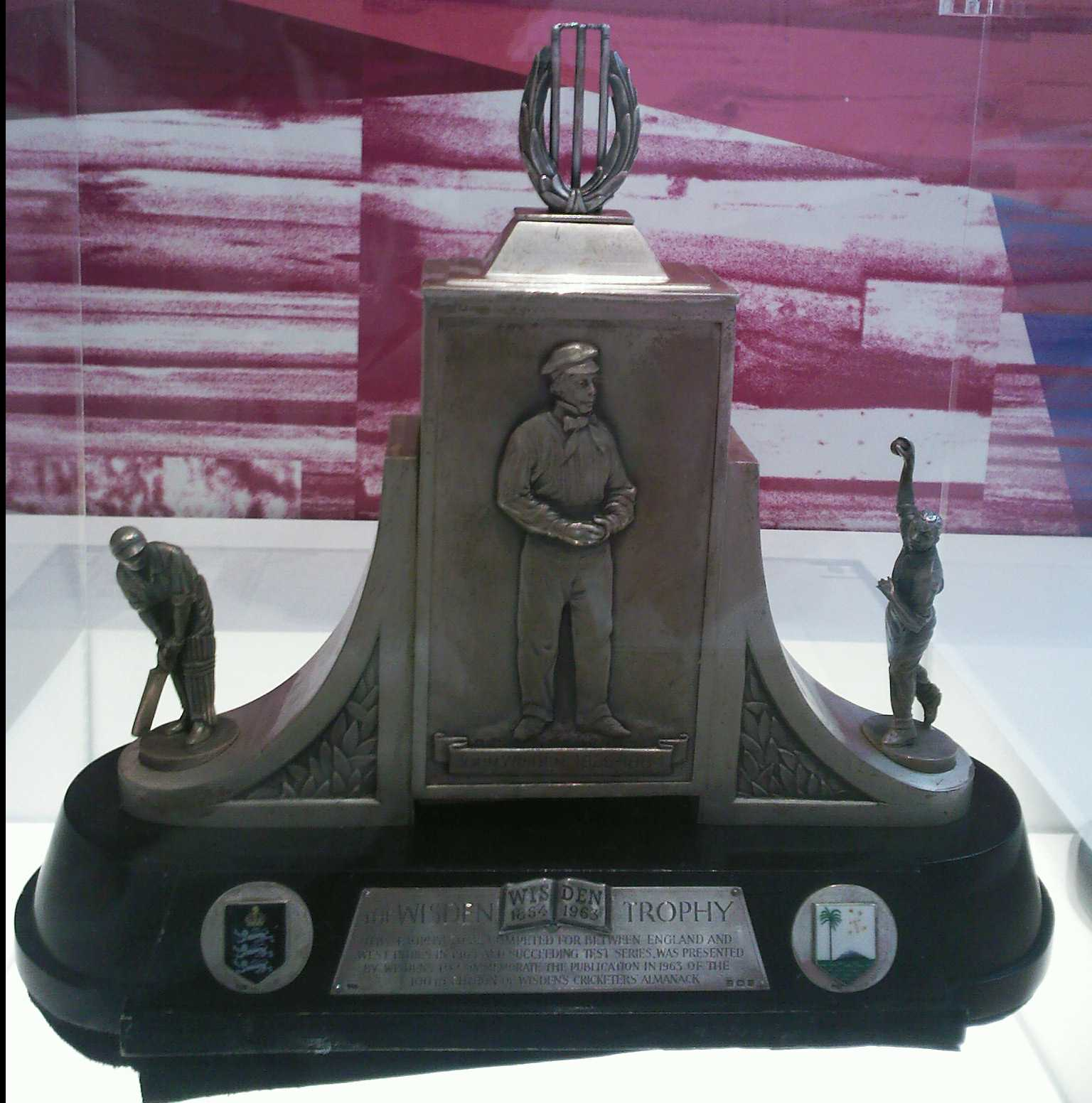
The Wisden trophy currently resides in the MCC Museum at Lord's Cricket Ground.

In 1963 John Wisden & Co. Ltd, with the approval of the MCC and the WICB, presented the first Wisden Trophy, to be contested in a similar manner to the Ashes.

The trophy is around 30 centimetres high, and a similar distance across its base. At the centre is an image of John Wisden. To Wisden's left is a smaller figure of a batsman taking guard, while to Wisden's right is a bowler in his delivery stride. Directly below Wisden is a plaque, on either side of which are the emblems of the English and West Indian teams. The plaque reads:

This Trophy, to be competed for between England and West Indies in 1963 and succeeding Test series, was presented by Wisden's to commemorate the publication in 1963 of the 100th edition of Wisden's Cricketers' Almanack.

== History ==
=== 1963 Inaugural trophy ===
With the growing Caribbean following in England, the West Indies entered the series as one of the most popular touring nations. Lance Gibbs' 11 wickets at Old Trafford set up a commanding 10 wicket win for the West Indies. The second match at Lord's was chiefly remembered for its dramatic ending; all results were possible going into the final over of the match. England required eight runs to win but only had two wickets left. From the fourth ball of the over Derek Shackleton was run out, which meant that Colin Cowdrey had to come out with a broken arm with two balls of the match remaining. He did not have to face a ball, and the match ended in a draw. The third Test saw Fred Trueman claim 12 wickets ensuring England won by 217 runs. Charlie Griffith's 6/36 in the fourth and Conrad Hunte's 108 in the final Test meant the West Indies won the next two Tests and the series finished 3–1. The final Test saw a pitch invasion when Basil Butcher scored the winning runs for the West Indies.

As a result of the great success of this series, England's future home Test programme was revised so that the West Indies could return in 1966, much earlier than originally planned. This was done by introducing "twin tours", in which two countries would each play three Tests against England in the course of a season.

=== 1966 Garry Sobers' series ===
Garry Sobers was the captain for the West Indies, while England had three captains: Mike Smith (first Test), Cowdrey (second–fourth Test) and Brian Close (fifth Test) during the five Test series. The West Indies team was not as strong as in the previous series, but many of their deficiencies were glossed over by Sobers' exceptional all-round performance. He scored centuries in three Test matches and claimed five wicket innings hauls in two Tests.

The first Test went to the West Indies with England succumbing in both innings to Gibbs who claimed 10 wickets in the Test. Butcher's 209 ensured the West Indies won the third to lead the series 2–0. The fourth Test saw Sobers' best performance, where he scored 174 runs and followed this up by taking 5/41 to give his team a 3–0 lead into the final Test. England gained a consolation victory, largely due to Tom Graveney’s 165 and a 128-run tenth wicket partnership.

The main difference between the two teams was the outstanding all-round performance of Sobers, who scored 722 runs at an average of 103.14, as well as taking 20 wickets and taking 10 catches.

=== 1967–69 Early series ===
This was the first of the Wisden Trophy series to take place in the West Indies. The series showed a more sinister side of the West Indies, with a riot occurring in the drawn second Test and the English team being attacked at the conclusion of the final Test. Despite these problems England were largely the better team, with Cowdrey's leadership, Geoffrey Boycott’s batting and a weakened West Indian attack being the difference between the sides.

After a drawn first Test the second match was a game of two halves. England developed a 233 run lead at the half way stage and had the West Indies on 204/5 when Butcher was caught. This dismissal caused a riot and from this point onwards England struggled with the spin bowling of Sobers and Gibbs, narrowly avoiding defeat by two wickets. The third Test saw another drawn match due to the slow batting of the West Indies, taking over two days to score 349 runs which included a spell of four runs in one hour. England took a 1–0 lead after the fourth Test, in a game that they seemed least like winning. The win was mainly due to Sobers' decision to declare on 92/2 in the West Indies second innings. Good batting by Alan Knott and a 127 sixth wicket partnership ensured the final game ended in a draw as England maintained their 1–0 lead to win the series.

The 1969 tour was a three Test series. The captains were Ray Illingworth for England and Sobers for the West Indies. The West Indies had an ageing team and, with Sobers suffering a loss of form, were always the weaker side.

England won the first Test with John Snow and David Brown claiming 13 wickets between them. A draw followed in Lord's, but England won the final match in a dramatic fashion. The West Indies in a seemingly strong position of 219/3 required 84 runs for victory. They suffered a late innings collapse however as Butcher, Sobers and Lloyd fell within 16 minutes, which ultimately led to England winning by 30 runs to win the series 2–0. It seemed that England would begin to dominate the West Indies, with many of the key West Indian players such as Butcher, Wes Hall and Charlie Griffith retiring in 1969. Illingworth would be the last England captain to win the Wisden Trophy for 31 years.

=== 1973–74 West Indies revival ===
This three Test series saw the West Indies re-establish themselves as the superior team. They won the first Test at The Oval by 158 runs, with Clive Lloyd's 132 with the bat and Keith Boyce's bowling (147/11 in the match) being the main contributions to the win. The drawn match at Edgbaston was at risk of being abandoned when umpire Arthur Fagg threatened to withdraw after Kanhai disputed one of his decisions. The final Test match at Lord's was dominated by the West Indies, with the team posting a huge total of 652/8 before declaring, Kanhai, Sobers and Bernard Julien all getting centuries. England never looked liked matching this total, and were dismissed for 233 in the first innings and 193 in the second, losing by an innings and 226 runs. This was England's second biggest defeat in Test cricket. The series finished 2–0 to the West Indies, who regained the Wisden Trophy.

The 1974 series in the West Indies was of five Tests. The West Indian team were regarded as the better side, and for them to only draw the series was a surprise. After they won the first Test it had seemed that the series would become a one-sided contest. This Test was notable for a controversial Alvin Kallicharran run out that triggered protests. England managed to secure draws in the next three Tests, thanks to Dennis Amiss' 262 in the second Test and Keith Fletcher's 129 in the third, while rain prevented a result in the fourth Test. The last match at Queen's Park Oval was a close game, with England winning by 26 runs, primarily due to Tony Greig taking 13 wickets bowling off-spin and Boycott scoring 212 runs in the match. England thereby levelled the series, which finished 1–1.

=== 1976 Viv Richards' series ===
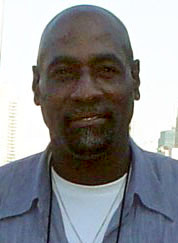
England had no answer to the batting of Sir Viv Richards.

England entered the series with great confidence, with English captain Greig saying that he had the players to make the West Indians "grovel". This threat proved to be an empty one, as it soon became apparent that England had no answer to Viv Richards' batting and Michael Holding's bowling.

The first two Tests ended in draws, but from the third Test onwards the West Indies took full control, with Richards scoring 524 runs in the last three Tests. He was supported by Holding, who took 25 wickets over these three Tests, including 5/17 in the third Test and 14/149 in the final Test. The West Indies won the series 3–0.

The series is mainly remembered for Richards' batting. He scored 829 runs at an average of 118.42 over four Test matches. In either the fourth or fifth Test in this series TMS commentator Brian Johnston allegedly said:

The bowler's Holding, the batsman's Willey

when describing the West Indian bowler Holding bowling to English batsmen Peter Willey. There are no records, according to Wisden, of Johnston or any other commentator saying this. Other sources have stated that Johnston had indeed said this and had prepared the line before saying it.

=== 1980–81 A new era ===
The late 70s and 80s was a golden era for the West Indies cricket team, with the team dominating all forms of cricket. The West Indies came into the 1980 series after recently winning the 1979 Cricket World Cup. They were generally regarded as the best team at Test level, and would lose only eight Test matches during the 1980s.

Ian Botham captained the England team while Lloyd skippered the West Indies in this five Test series. In a series that was hampered by rain, the only match to produce a positive result was the first Test at Trent Bridge. It was a close contest, with a dramatic ending which saw six dropped catches and the West Indies requiring 208 runs in the final 8 hours of play. The West Indies achieved this target with 2 wickets in hand, largely due to Desmond Haynes' 64.

England went to the West Indies for the 1981 five Test series. This became four Tests after the second Test abandonment caused by Robin Jackman's visa being revoked by the Guyanese Government due to his involvement with South Africa's apartheid regime.

The series was dominated by the West Indies bowlers Holding and Colin Croft, who claimed 41 wickets between them in the series. England suffered an innings defeat in the first Test, and lost the third by 298 runs as they failed to register an innings of over 250 in the first three Tests. Strong batting performances and rain enabled England to draw the final two Tests, and so the series ended 2–0 to the West Indies.

=== 1984–86 "Blackwash" series ===
The "blackwash" series occurred in 1984 and 1985–86. The West Indies beat England 5–0 in both series in a whitewash that was dubbed "blackwash". The first blackwash occurred in England and the second in the West Indies. Instrumental in these wins were Richards' batting and the bowling partnership of Malcolm Marshall and Joel Garner, which claimed 105 of the 199 England wickets to fall in the two series. Many players from the West Indies had taken part in the so-called Supertests a few years earlier and as a result they were arguably fitter and better prepared due to having faced stronger opposition. The captains for these series were Lloyd and Richards for the West Indies, and David Gower, who had the ignominy of leading England to ten consecutive defeats against the men from the Caribbean.

The 1984 series began with Andy Lloyd being hit on the head, resulting in his being hospitalised. This would prove to be a common theme throughout the series, as the English batsmen struggled to cope with the West Indies bouncers. Whenever England threatened, a West Indian player would step up and take control of the match, as when Gordon Greenidge scored 214 after an England declaration to win the second Test. The series was decided at Leeds, where the West Indies gained an unassailable 3–0 lead. The final Test at The Oval saw the West Indies record the only whitewash by a visiting nation in a five Test series. This was the fifth whitewash in Test cricket and the first to be inflicted on England in England.

The 1985–86 series in the West Indies ended in another whitewash with the West Indies winning each Test comfortably, the closest match being a seven wicket victory. Like the previous series the English batsmen provided little resistance against the West Indian bowlers with only Gower averaging above 30. Poor performances from Botham and Mike Gatting's injury ensured an easy series win for the West Indies. England's attitude also played a part in their defeat with big players such as Gower and Botham showing a certain reluctance to net training. The then chairman of selectors Peter May questioned the team's attitude and called for greater resolve, a view that seemed to be shared by the general public at the time.

The West Indies won the first two Tests in a similar manner with England struggling with the bowling of Patrick Patterson and Marshall. By the third Test, England's morale had dipped and they suffered an innings defeat which was largely due to their third day's performance losing 15 wickets for 201. A ten wicket defeat followed in the fourth while Richards produced the fastest century in Test cricket in the final Test. He reached his hundred in only 56 balls to confirm the West Indies superiority. As a result, the West Indies had won ten consecutive Tests against England, and were the second team after Australia to achieve multiple home whitewashes in five Test series.

=== 1988 Summer of four captains ===
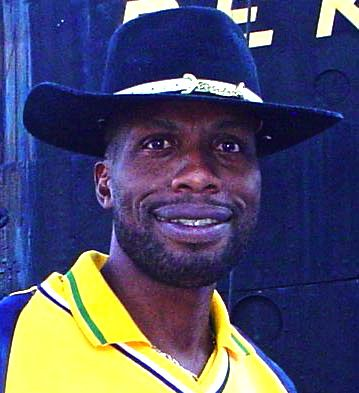
The 1988 tour was Curtly Ambrose's first for West Indies.

This tour saw the beginning of a bowling partnership between Courtney Walsh and Curtly Ambrose that would trouble batsmen across the world for the next 12 years. England, on the other hand, had entered the series with low expectations and confidence. This was reflected in their team selections, with 23 players being used during the series.

England had four captains in Gatting, John Emburey, Chris Cowdrey and Graham Gooch, but each Test ended in West Indian dominance. They won each match except the first Test, which was drawn because of rain, and the series finished 4–0. The West Indies pace attack was the main difference between teams with Marshall being the most dangerous bowler, taking 35 wickets at an average of 12.65. This included a 7/22 in the third Test which he bowled with a broken left hand. Marshall was supported by Ambrose's bowling which yielded 22 wickets. After this series both teams would go into decline. Many of the great West Indian players such as Richards and Marshall would soon retire, and their dominance of the Test stage was nearing its end.

=== 1989–91 England close the gap ===
Throughout the late 70s and 80s, many of the series between the West Indies and England had been dominated by the West Indies who had won fourteen of the fifteen Tests, often by large margins. The next two series in 1989–90 season and 1991 would prove to be closer contests.

A 1989–90 series of two halves saw England close to taking a shock 2–0 lead in the series, only to be denied by a wet afternoon at Queens Park Oval and an unusually egregious instance of time-wasting in which officials and ground staff appeared to be complicit, as remarked upon by Brian Lara in a 2017 address. Injuries to their key bowler, Angus Fraser, and batsman, Gooch, changed the course of the series dramatically however, as the West Indies fought back to win the next two Tests, thanks to the pace attack of Ambrose and Ian Bishop. They eventually won the series 2–1. An infamous incident occurred in the fourth Test of the series, when Rob Bailey was given out by umpire Lloyd Barker, who had allegedly been intimidated by Richards' appeal.

Notable debutants in this series were Alec Stewart and Nasser Hussain, who both made their debuts in the first Test. Alec Stewart was not England's wicket-keeper in this Test series, as Jack Russell kept wicket.

A decline in the West Indies batting line-up coupled by the loss of Greenidge ensured this series would be a closer contest. The tour was Richards' last, as he retired at the end of the fifth Test. Graeme Hick and Mark Ramprakash made their debuts in the first Test at Headingley.

England won the first Test largely thanks to Gooch's 154 in the second innings. This innings was rated by Wisden as the third greatest Test innings ever. After the second Test had been drawn, the West Indies won the next two matches due to Ambrose's eight wickets in the third and Richie Richardson's century in fourth match. Phil Tufnell and Robin Smith played key roles in the final Test, as England won by five wickets after forcing the West Indies to follow-on for the first time in six years, to level the series 2–2. In this Test commentator Jonathan Agnew famously reduced both himself and fellow commentator Brian Johnston to uncontrollable laughter when he described Botham's hit wicket dismissal by saying:

He couldn't quite get his leg over.

=== 1994 Lara enters the world stage ===
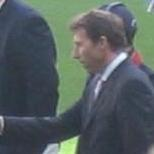
Michael Atherton would captain England in 17 Tests against the West Indies.

The series was characterised by the opening pair of Stewart and new England captain Michael Atherton, which provided the greatest resistance against the West Indian attack of Ambrose and Walsh. The pair scored 987 runs in the series while Ambrose ended the series with 26 wickets at an average of 19.96 and was awarded man of the series.

After England lost the first three Tests (which included a 46 all out in the second innings of the third Test) there was talk of another blackwash series. England secured a victory in the fourth Test however, with Stewart's two centuries and Fraser's eight wickets being the main contributors to the win. This was the first time in 59 years that a visiting nation had won at the Kensington Oval. The main highlight of the series was to come in the final Test at Antigua, where Brian Lara broke Sobers' Test world record score of 365 not out, set 36 years earlier, by scoring 375. Lara was congratulated by Sobers, who was present on the ground to see his record broken.

In the end Lara scored an exceptional 798 runs at an average of 99.75. Two months later Lara would go on to break the first-class batting record of 499 runs by scoring 501 not out against Durham at Edgbaston.

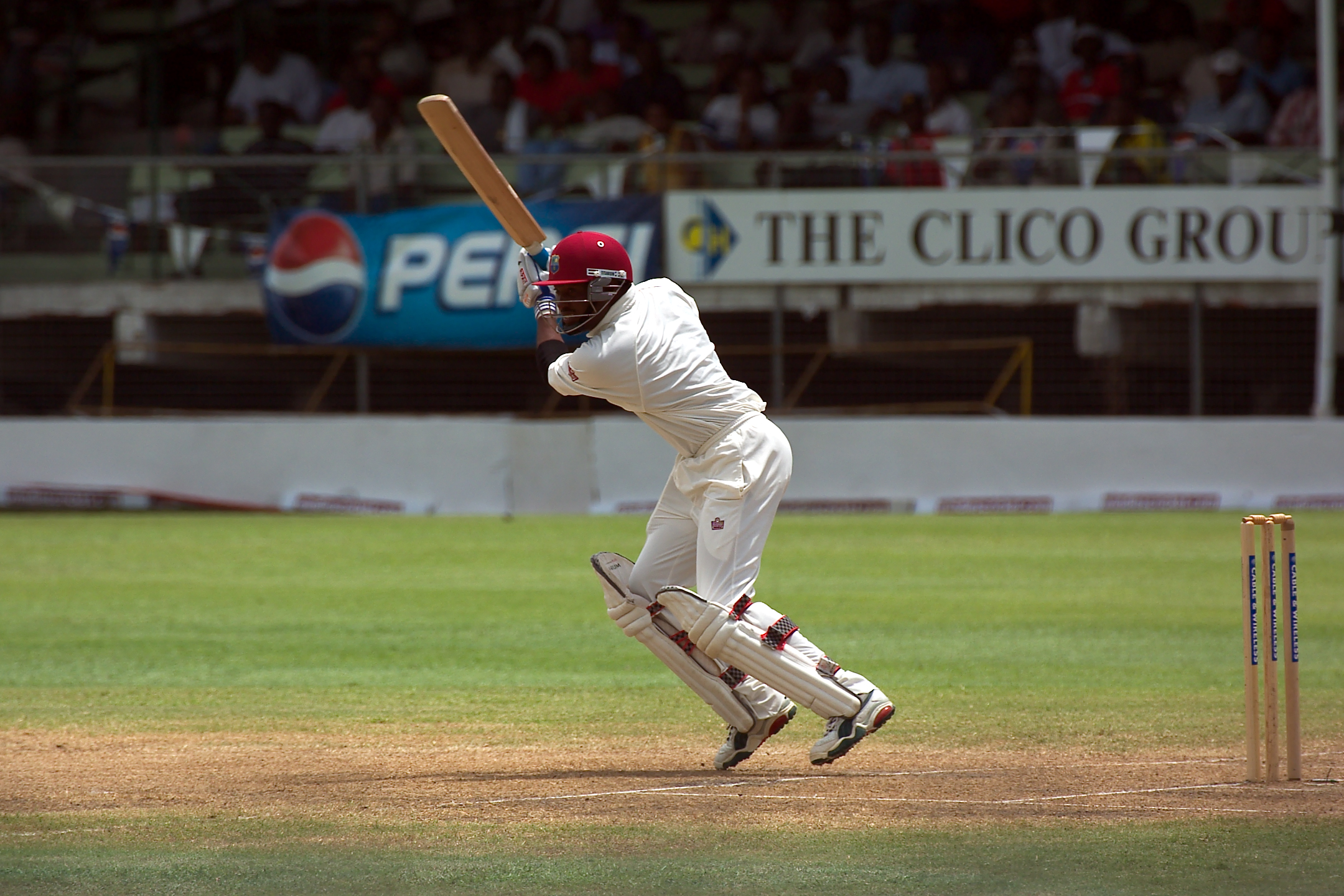
Brian Lara batting at Kensington Oval

Shivnarine Chanderpaul made his Test debut in the second Test of the series, when he made his maiden half-century. Chanderpaul was Lara's last batting partner when he made his record-breaking 375, scoring 75 not out himself and combining in a 219 fifth wicket partnership.

=== 1995–98 Six Test series ===
Both teams were evenly matched, with the West Indies not the force they had been, and England on the rise. The key players for the West Indies were Lara, Walsh and Bishop while England had a strong opening pair of Atherton and Graham Thorpe plus the young Dominic Cork who would be decisive in England's two Test victories in this series.

The West Indies' inconsistent performances saw them dominate one Test, only to play poorly and lose the next. Bishop's and Walsh's combined 26 wickets in the first and third Tests ensured the West Indies won these matches by commanding margins. Cork contributed greatly to England's second and fourth Test victories, taking 7/43 in the second Test and a hat-trick in the fourth in claiming the wickets of Richardson (bowled), Junior Murray (LBW) and Carl Hooper (LBW). The remaining two Tests were dominated by the batsmen, with five centuries being scored. The series finished 2–2, with the West Indies retaining the trophy.

The men of the series were Atherton for England and Lara for the West Indies. The latter made 765 runs at an average of 85. Cork made his debut in the second Test, where he achieved the best bowling figures for an English debutant. Nick Knight's debut came in the fourth Test of series.

An ageing West Indian team relied increasingly on Ambrose and Walsh to provide wickets, while Lara was seen as the primary source of runs. Angus Fraser played an important role for England, and when his form dipped in the later Tests the side's performance suffered.

The series started in a controversial fashion, with the first Test at Sabina Park being abandoned after the pitch was deemed to be too dangerous due to its highly irregular bounce. As a result of this abandoned match, an additional match was arranged with the series thereby being extended to six Tests. Two close matches followed, after which the teams were level at 1–1. England faded in the second half of the series. The West Indies scored two decisive victories, winning the fourth by 242 runs and the last by an even wider margin of an innings and 52 runs, to take the series 3–1.

=== 2000–07 English dominance ===
==== 2000 ====
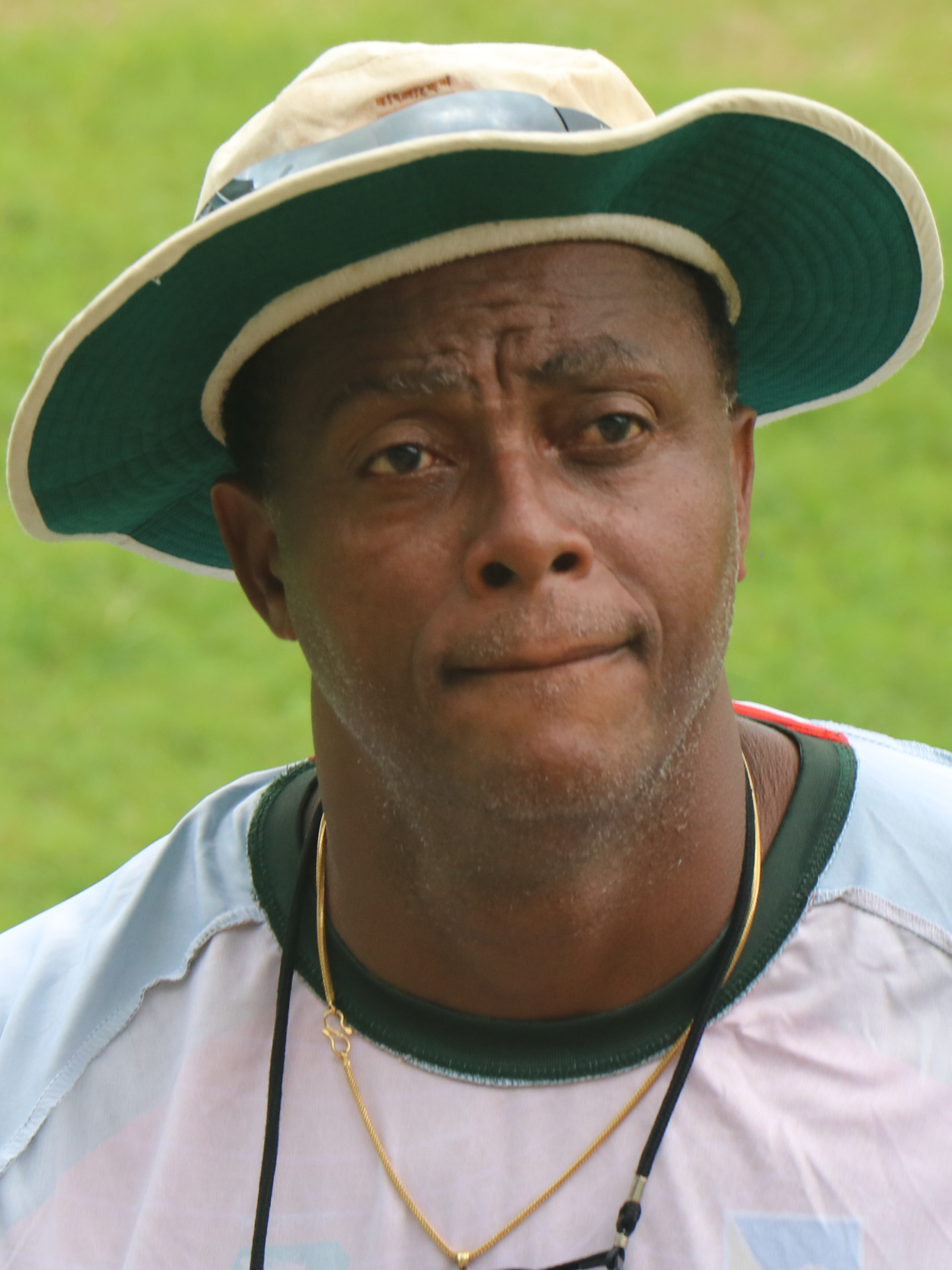
In the first match of the 2000 series Courtney Walsh became the first player to reach 450 wickets in Test cricket.

Jimmy Adams was selected as the West Indies captain, while Hussain captained the England side. This five Test series was to be Ambrose's last. It was dominated by the ball, with a bowler claiming a five wicket haul on seven occasions, while there were only three centuries.

The West Indies started well, winning the first Test comfortably by an innings and 93 runs, and led by 133 runs after the first innings of the second Test. The turning point came in the second innings of this match, as the West Indies were bowled out for 54 (this was their third lowest innings at the time). England won this Test, and they seized the initiative in the series by winning the fourth and fifth Tests thanks to Andy Caddick's four-wicket over and Atherton's century, to regain the Wisden Trophy 3–1 after a period of 31 years.

Notable debutants were Matthew Hoggard and Marcus Trescothick, in the second and third Tests respectively. Trescothick had the highest batting average for any player in the series, with 47.50.

==== 2003–04 Lara's 400 ====
England came to the West Indies for their first defence of the Wisden Trophy. The recently appointed captain for England was Michael Vaughan, Hussain having stepped down a few months previously. Lara led the West Indies challenge.

The series was dominated by England's bowling attack of Stephen Harmison and Hoggard. Harmison's bowling figures of 7/12 (which were the best achieved in Sabina Park Tests) were the main cause of the West Indian second innings collapse to 47 all out in the first Test. This was the lowest innings for West Indies at Test level. This pattern was repeated in the third Test, where the West Indies produced a good first innings only to bat poorly in the second. This was partly due to Hoggard's hat-trick of Ramnaresh Sarwan (caught), Chanderpaul (LBW) and Ryan Hinds (caught). The West Indies were facing a whitewash going into the final Test at Antigua, and were accused by Sobers of underestimating the English bowlers. The fourth Test saw Lara come to the crease with the score at 33/1. He stayed for 778 minutes and faced 582 balls in the process of making his world record Test innings of 400 not out, before declaring at 751/5. It was not enough for victory and the game ended in a draw. As a result of this drawn match Lara was criticised by Ricky Ponting who stated that the whole West Indies first innings revolved around Lara's score who let the Test match slip for his own personal gain. The series finished 3–0 to England.

==== 2004–07 English dominance at home ====
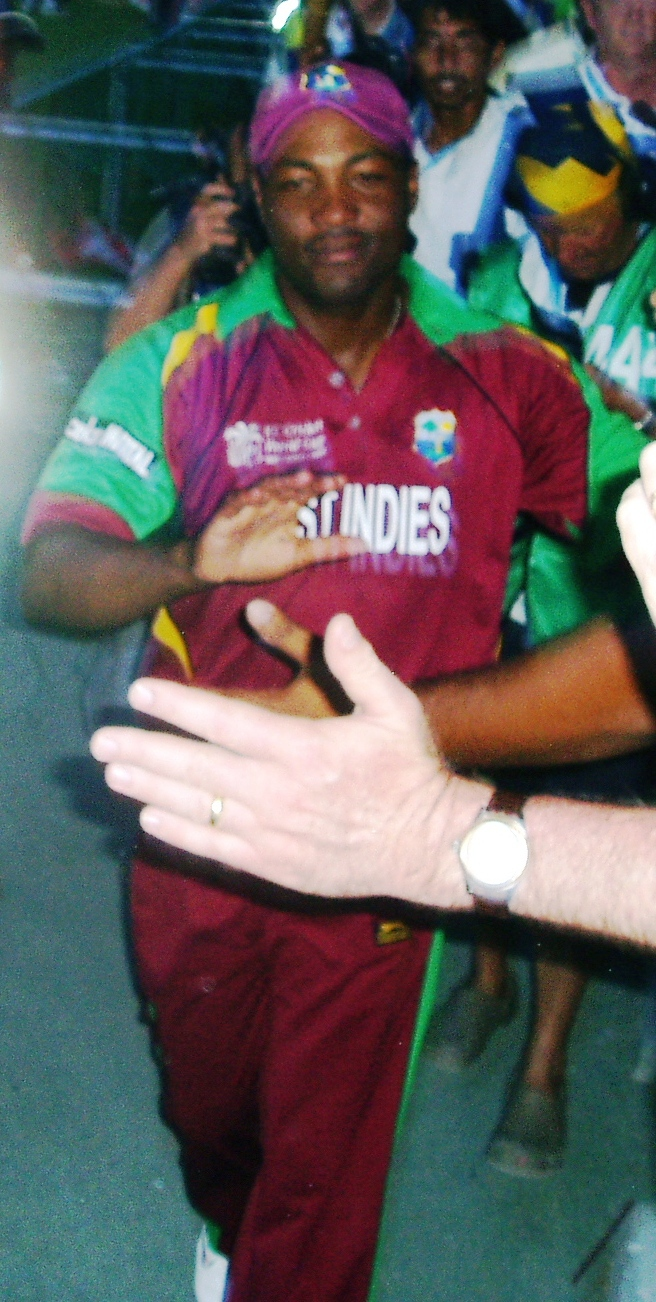
The 2004 tour of England would prove to be Brian Lara's final Wisden Trophy series.

England dominated the 2004 series and claimed the first English whitewash in the Wisden Trophy's history. England won each Test comfortably, as the West Indian bowlers struggled to get wickets. Only Chris Gayle and Dwayne Bravo had bowling averages lower than 30. This whitewash meant that England had won seven consecutive Tests for the first time in 75 years. The series was the beginning of a run that would see England win the Ashes the following year.

Andrew Flintoff was the leading performer for England, averaging 64.50 with the bat and claiming 14 wickets. Ashley Giles was the leading wicket taker in the series with 22. This series saw Ian Bell make his Test debut in the final Test of the series, where he compiled his maiden half-century. The main highlights for the West Indies were Chanderpaul's batting performance in scoring 437 runs at an average of 72.83, the highest in the series, and Bravo's 16 wickets.

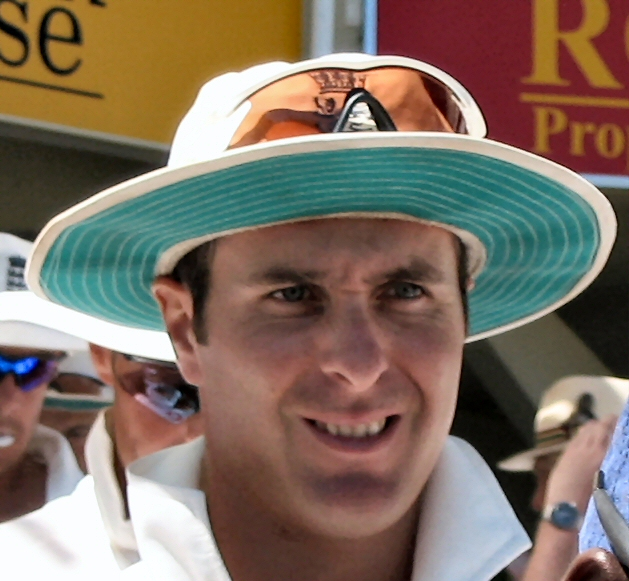
Michael Vaughan became the most successful England captain, in the third Test of this series.

With the recent retirement of Lara, Sarwan became the captain of the West Indies. Sarwan injured himself while fielding in the second Test, and the captaincy was given to Daren Ganga. Andrew Strauss was England skipper for the first Test, after which Vaughan returned from injury to lead for the remaining Tests.

England were largely the better team and, if not for the resilient batting of Chanderpaul, they would have won by an even larger margin. The West Indies suffered greatly from his absence in the second Test, losing the match by an innings and 283 runs, their biggest defeat in Test history. England retained the Wisden trophy at Old Trafford by taking an unbeatable 2–0 lead, They ultimately won the series 3–0.

Chanderpaul, who was named the West Indian player of the series, scored 446 runs at an average of 148.66. Bravo also impressed with his all-round performance in claiming 6 wickets, scoring 291 runs and taking 7 catches. England saw the emergence of Matt Prior, who became the first English wicket-keeper to score a Test century on debut. Monty Panesar claimed the most wickets (23) and received the award of the Englishman of the series, while Ryan Sidebottom took 16 wickets.

=== 2009–2020 See-sawing series ===
==== 2009 back-to-back series ====
Despite England going into the series as the favourites, West Indies won the series 1–0 after winning the first match at Sabina Park. The remaining matches all ended in draws. The series was originally intended as a four Test series; however the abandonment of the Second Test due to the conditions of the field at the SVR Stadium in Antigua led to the rapid inclusion of an additional game staged at the Antigua Recreation Ground, resulting in a five, rather than four match Test series. In a two-match series that replaced the originally scheduled tour by Zimbabwe, and the previously announced tour by Sri Lanka, England regained the Wisden Trophy with a 2–0 win.

==== 2012 ====
England retained the trophy in 2012 with a 2–0 series win. Although the third and final test at Edgbaston was almost a complete washout with three whole days lost to rain, Tino Best scored a world record 95 as a number 11, in a 10th-wicket partnership of 143 with Dinesh Ramdin, itself a West Indies record. Best's record stood for less than 12 months, however, as it was eclipsed by Ashton Agar, also against England, in the 2013 Ashes series.

==== 2015 ====
Despite going into the 2015 series as heavy favourites, turmoil off the field including the sacking of Kevin Pietersen and a disastrous 2015 Cricket World Cup resulted in England playing poorly in the West Indies, being unable to bowl the West Indies out in the first test, with Jason Holder holding firm against the England bowlers. England performed much better in the second test match on the back of 182 not out from Joe Root that meant that they retained the Wisden Trophy as they won their first test match away from home since December 2012. The third test, however, featured a batting collapse from England that set the West Indies just 194 to level the series, and they duly did so, meaning that England had not won a test series away from home since 2012.

==== 2017 ====
The first test in 2017 was played as day/night test match, the first (and so far only) test match to be played with a pink ball in England. 243 from Alastair Cook set England up for a huge innings win, with the West Indies losing 19 wickets in a single day as England won by an innings and 209 runs. The second test match, however, featured a major fightback from the West Indies, with Shai Hope scoring a century in both innings at Headingley - the first time such a feat had been achieved in all first class cricket on that ground - allowing the West Indies to memorably chase down 322 runs on the final day, their first test victory in England since 2000. England made their own fightback in a low-scoring decider at Lord's, with James Anderson (cricketer) taking his 500th test wicket in the second innings when he bowled Kraigg Brathwaite on his way to best test figures of 7-42, which allowed England to win the game after scoring 107 to win.

==== 2019 West Indies finally regains the trophy ====
England were hot favourites after whitewashing Sri Lanka away from home 3–0 but hopes of a repeat performance of the Sri Lanka tour quickly faded away when they were dismissed for just 77 in the first innings in Barbados, giving the West Indies a first innings lead of 212. Opting not to follow on, captain Jason Holder then drove England into the ground with 202 not out, setting England a whopping 628 to win. England started strongly with Rory Burns making 84, before Roston Chase ran through the English middle order as the West Indies won by a huge margin of 381 runs, their biggest ever victory at home. England's woes continued in the second test at Antigua as they were dismissed under 200 twice in a match for the first time since January 2014, thus setting the West Indies just 14 to regain the Wisden Trophy, which they duly did despite a consolation victory for England in the final test.

==== 2020 – Final Wisden Trophy Series ====
Played during the COVID-19 pandemic, it was announced that this would be the final series playing for the Wisden Trophy.

Cricket all around the globe had come to a halt as a result of the pandemic and consequently imposed lockdowns in different countries. This series, played under special regulations owing to the pandemic, marked the resumption of International cricket. Under the special regulations, two Bio-Secure venues were created at Old Trafford, Manchester and Rose Bowl, Southampton. The venues had on-site hotels and players were not allowed to travel outside. Also, the use of saliva to shine the ball had been banned. The players were tested repetitively throughout the series and were advised to not exchange high-fives and hugs during the play.

The West Indies team were required to spend two weeks in isolation before beginning with their practice due to the guidelines from UK government. Darren Bravo, Keemo Paul and Shimron Hetmeyer pulled out of the tour.

England won the series 2–1, to regain the trophy, after falling one test behind and then winning the remaining two tests comfortably. Seam bowler Stuart Broad was the hero, after being left out for the first test, contributing 6 wickets in the second test and 10 wickets plus 62 runs in the final test.

== Results ==
A team had to win a series to regain the Wisden Trophy, a drawn series resulting in the current holders retaining the trophy. A total of 28 Wisden Trophy series were played, with West Indies winning 14 and England 10. The remaining 4 series were drawn, with West Indies retaining the Wisden Trophy on three occasions (1973–74, 1991 and 1995) and England on one occasion (2015). In the series' 57-year history the Wisden Trophy changed hands on seven occasions (1968, 1973, 2000, twice in 2009, 2019 and 2020), with England regaining the trophy in 1968, 2000, May 2009 and 2020, while the West Indies regained it in 1973, March 2009 and 2019.

120 Test matches were played, with West Indies winning 48 times, England 36 times, and 36 matches being drawn. Brian Lara is the top scorer in the Wisden Trophy series with 2983 runs, while Curtly Ambrose is the leading wicket taker with 164 wickets.

== Match venues ==
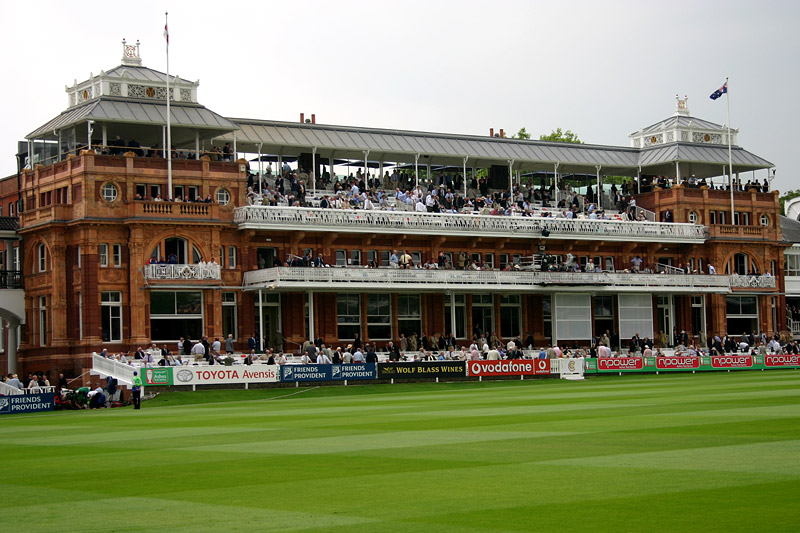
The Pavilion at Lord's

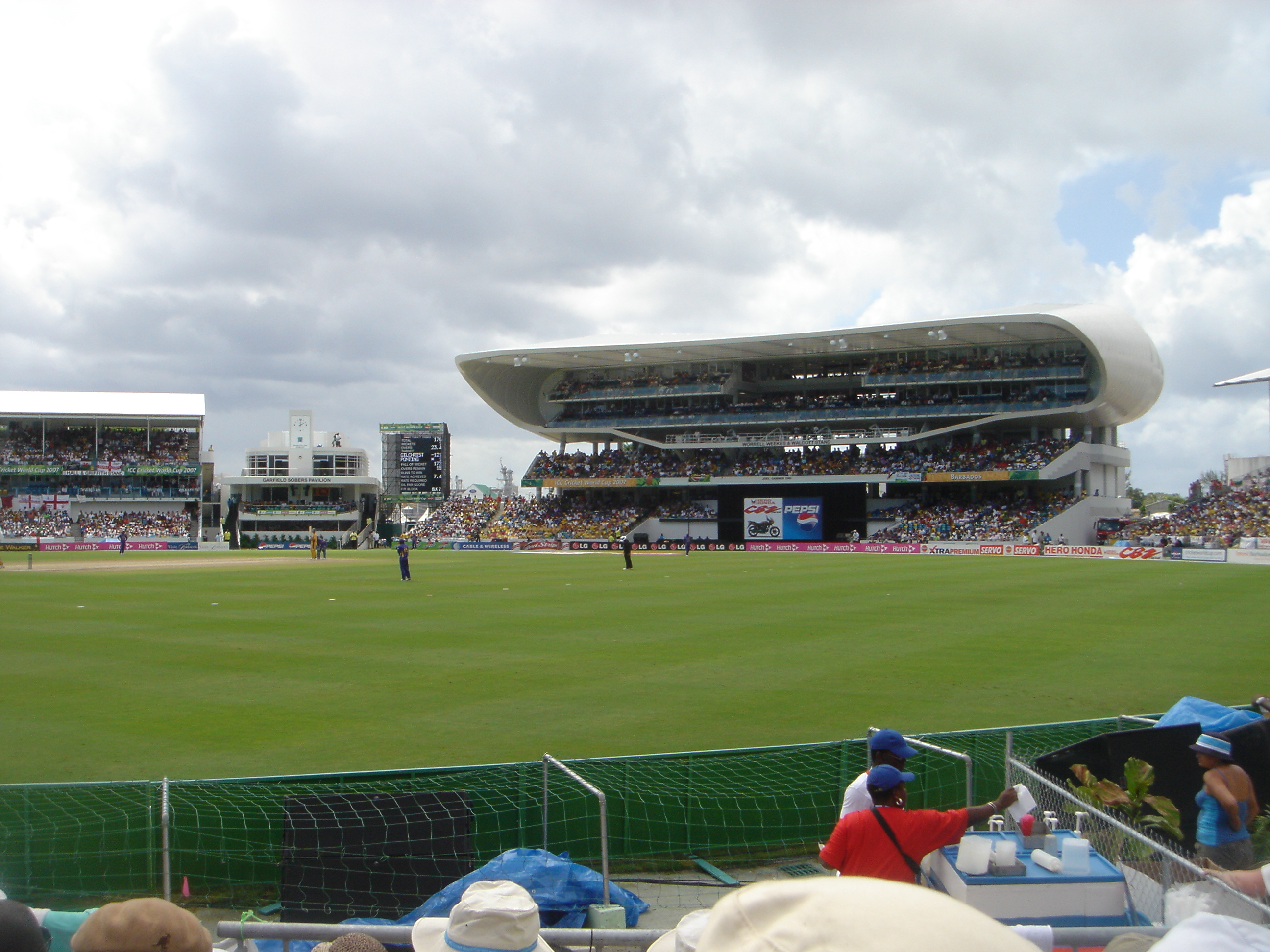
Kensington Oval

The series usually alternated between England and West Indies, and matches were held at the following grounds.

In England
| Stadium | County† | First Test | Last Test | Played | England wins | | Draws* | West Indies wins | | Ref |
|---|---|---|---|---|---|---|---|---|---|---|
| Old Trafford, Manchester | Lancashire | 1963 | 2020 | 13 | 6 | 2020 | 2 | 5 | 1988 | |
| Lord's, London | Middlesex | 1963 | 2017 | 16 | 6 | 2017 | 7 | 3 | 1988 | |
| Edgbaston, Birmingham | Warwickshire | 1963 | 2017 | 9 | 3 | 2017 | 2 | 4 | 2000 | |
| Headingley, Leeds | Yorkshire | 1963 | 2017 | 12 | 4 | 2007 | 1 | 7 | 2017 | |
| The Oval, London | Surrey | 1963 | 2004 | 11 | 4 | 2004 | 2 | 5 | 1988 | |
| Trent Bridge, Nottingham | Nottinghamshire | 1966 | 2012 | 7 | 1 | 2012 | 3 | 3 | 1991 | |
| The Riverside, Chester-le-Street | Durham | 2007 | 2009 | 2 | 2 | 2009 | 0 | 0 | – | |
| The Rose Bowl, Southampton | Hampshire | 2020 | 2020 | 1 | 0 | – | 0 | 1 | 2020 | |
In the West Indies
| Stadium | Countries | First Test | Last Test | Played | West Indies wins | | Draws* | England wins | | Ref |
| Queen's Park Oval, Port of Spain | Trinidad and Tobago | 1967–68 | 2008–09 | 13 | 6 | 1998 | 3 | 4 | 2004 | |
| Sabina Park, Kingston | Jamaica | 1967–68 | 2008–09 | 9 | 3 | 2009 | 4 | 2 | 2004 | |
| Kensington Oval, Bridgetown | Barbados | 1967–68 | 2018–19 | 11 | 5 | 2019 | 4 | 2 | 2004 | |
| Bourda, Georgetown‡ | Guyana | 1967–68 | 1997–98 | 6 | 2 | 1998 | 4 | 0 | – | |
| The Recreation Ground, St. John's‡ | Antigua and Barbuda | 1980–81 | 2008–09 | 7 | 3 | 2009 | 4 | 0 | – | |
| Sir Vivian Richards Stadium, St. John's | Antigua and Barbuda | 2008–09 | 2018–19 | 3 | 1 | 2019 | 2 | 0 | – | |
| National Cricket Stadium, St. George's | Grenada | 2014–15 | 2014–15 | 0 | 0 | – | 0 | 1 | 2015 | |
| Daren Sammy Cricket Ground, Gros Islet | Saint Lucia | 2018–19 | 2018–19 | 0 | 0 | – | 0 | 1 | 2019 | |

^{*}Including abandoned tests

^{†}Historic Counties of England who play at the grounds

^{‡}Former Grounds which don't host Test Matches

== Malcolm Marshall Memorial Trophy ==
Named after the West Indian bowler Malcolm Marshall, this trophy was awarded to the leading wicket taker of the series from 2000 to 2020. The player who was awarded it also received £1,360, but if he surpassed Marshall's record of 35 wickets set in 1988 he would earn £34,000. The table below lists all the players who won this trophy.

| Series | Wickets taken in series | Player |
|---|---|---|
| 2000 Wisden Trophy | 34 wickets (220.2 overs) | (Cricket West Indies) Courtney Walsh |
| 2003–04 Wisden Trophy | 23 wickets (139.5 overs) | (England) Stephen Harmison |
| 2004 Wisden Trophy | 22 wickets (186.1 overs) | (England) Ashley Giles |
| 2007 Wisden Trophy | 23 wickets (143.5 overs) | (England) Monty Panesar |
| 2009 Wisden Trophy | 19 wickets (180.2 overs) | (England) Graeme Swann |
| 2009 Wisden Trophy | 11 wickets (64.3 overs) | (England) James Anderson |
| 2012 Wisden Trophy | 14 wickets (102.5 overs) | (England) Stuart Broad |
| 2014–15 Wisden Trophy | 17 wickets (119.2 overs) | (England) James Anderson |
| 2020 Wisden Trophy | 16 wickets | (England) Stuart Broad |
Source: Cricinfo.com. Last updated: 16 June 2015

== See also ==
- Laws of cricket
- Cricket terminology
- The Ashes (Australia–England)
- Frank Worrell Trophy (Australia–West Indies)
- Border–Gavaskar Trophy (Australia–India)
