= English cricket team in the West Indies in 2008–09 =

English cricket team in West Indies in 2008–09
	England	West Indies
- Dates: 25 January – 3 April 2009
Captains	Andrew Strauss	Chris Gayle

Test series
- Result: West Indies won the 5-match series 1–0
Most runs	Andrew Strauss (541)	Ramnaresh Sarwan (626)
Most wickets	Graeme Swann (19)	Sulieman Benn (12)
- Player of the series: Ramnaresh Sarwan (WI)

One Day International series
- Results: England won the 5-match series 3–2
Most runs	Andrew Strauss (204)	Shivnarine Chanderpaul (201)
Most wickets	James Anderson (9)	Kieron Pollard (9)
- Player of the series: Andrew Strauss (Eng)

Twenty20 International series
- Results: West Indies won the 1-match series 1–0
Most runs	Steven Davies (27)	Ramnaresh Sarwan (59)
Most wickets	Amjad Khan (2)	Sulieman Benn (3)
- Player of the series: Ramnaresh Sarwan (WI)

The England cricket team toured the West Indies between 25 January 2009 and 3 April 2009. Initially, it was intended that they play four Test matches, one Twenty20 International and five One Day Internationals against the West Indies cricket team. However, the abandonment of the Second Test due to the conditions of the field at the Sir Vivian Richards Stadium in Antigua led to the rapid inclusion of an additional game staged at the Antigua Recreation Ground, resulting in a five-match, rather than four-match Test series. The West Indies regained the Wisden Trophy by winning the Test series 1–0. They also won the Twenty20 match, but England won the ODI series 3–2.

== Build-up ==
Despite recent turmoils, England went into the series as firm favourite. The players claimed confidence, the ICC rankings placed them comfortably ahead of their adversaries, and the pundits were, under the circumstances, fairly buoyant. In The Daily Telegraph, Geoffrey Boycott opined that, with a fit Andrew Flintoff, England ought to prevail easily:

I am not saying it will be a walkover. The one thing England do need is a fit Andrew Flintoff, throughout all the four Tests. If Freddie goes down injured, the odds for the series will turn around dramatically.

== Test series ==
=== 1st Test ===
4–8 February
Scorecard

England	v	West Indies
318 (122.2 overs); Kevin Pietersen 97 (172); Sulieman Benn 4/77 (44.2 overs)		392 (157.4 overs); Ramnaresh Sarwan 107 (290); Stuart Broad 5/85 (29 overs)
51 (33.2 overs); Andrew Flintoff 24 (47); Jerome Taylor 5/11 (9 overs)

West Indies won by an innings and 23 runs
Sabina Park, Kingston, Jamaica
Umpires: Tony Hill (NZ) and Rudi Koertzen (SA)
Player of the match: Jerome Taylor (WI)

- England won the toss and elected to bat.
- England's second-innings total of 51 is their third-lowest in Test cricket.

=== 2nd Test ===
13–17 February
Scorecard

England	v	West Indies
7/0 (1.4 overs); Andrew Strauss 6* (8)

Match drawn
Sir Vivian Richards Stadium, North Sound, Antigua
Umpires: Daryl Harper (Aus) and Tony Hill (NZ)

- West Indies won the toss and elected to field.
- Play was abandoned after 10 balls due to an overly sandy and dangerous outfield which left the bowlers to be unable to gain any solid footholds; an extra Test was scheduled. The Test match thus became the shortest in recorded history, overtaking the record previously held by another match in the West Indies in 1998 involving the same teams, which was abandoned under similar circumstances. The statistics of the abandoned Test stood, however, contributing to the statistics of all players involved.

=== 3rd Test ===
15–19 February
Scorecard

England	v	West Indies
566/9d (165.2 overs); Andrew Strauss 169 (278); Jerome Taylor 2/73 (28 overs)		285 (89.2 overs); Ramnaresh Sarwan 94 (133); Graeme Swann 5/57 (24 overs)
221/8d (50 overs); Alastair Cook 58 (103); Daren Powell 2/33 (7 overs)		370/9 (128 overs); Ramnaresh Sarwan 106 (196); Stuart Broad 3/69 (21 overs)

Match drawn
Antigua Recreation Ground, St. John's, Antigua
Umpires: Daryl Harper (Aus) and Rudi Koertzen (SA)
Player of the match: Ramnaresh Sarwan (WI)

- West Indies won the toss and elected to field.
- An additional Test match was added to the schedule following the abandonment of the 2nd Test; this took advantage of the fact that the abandoned game was in Antigua, which meant that the Antigua Recreation Ground was available. The newly scheduled 3rd Test began two days after the abandonment of the previous game.

=== 4th Test ===
26 February – 2 March
Scorecard

England	v	West Indies
600/6d (153.2 overs); Andrew Strauss 142 (210); Fidel Edwards 3/151 (30 overs)		749/9d (194.4 overs); Ramnaresh Sarwan 291 (452); Graeme Swann 5/165 (50.4 overs)
279/2 (81 overs); Alastair Cook 139* (256); Chris Gayle 1/46 (17 overs)

Match drawn
Kensington Oval, Bridgetown, Barbados
Umpires: Aleem Dar (Pak) and Russell Tiffin (Zim)
Player of the match: Ramnaresh Sarwan (WI)

- England won the toss and elected to bat.

=== 5th Test ===
6–10 March
Scorecard

England	v	West Indies
546/6d (158.5 overs); Paul Collingwood 161 (288); Lionel Baker 2/77 (23 overs)		544 (178.4 overs); Shivnarine Chanderpaul 147* (361); Stuart Broad 3/67 (30 overs)
237/6d (38.4 overs); Kevin Pietersen 102 (92); Lionel Baker 2/39 (8 overs)		114/8 (65.5 overs); Ryan Hinds 20 (94); Graeme Swann 3/13 (21 overs)

Match drawn
Queen's Park Oval, Port of Spain, Trinidad
Umpires: Daryl Harper (Aus) and Russell Tiffin (Zim)
Player of the match: Matt Prior (Eng)

- England won the toss and elected to bat.
- Amjad Khan (Eng) and Lendl Simmons (WI) made their Test debuts.

== T20I series ==
=== Only T20I ===
15 March
Scorecard

England; 121 (19.1 overs)	v	West Indies; 123/4 (18 overs)
Steven Davies 27 (21); Sulieman Benn 3/24 (4 overs)		Ramnaresh Sarwan 59 (46); Amjad Khan 2/34 (4 overs)

West Indies won by 6 wickets
Queen's Park Oval, Port of Spain, Trinidad
Umpires: Clyde Duncan (WI) and Norman Malcolm (WI)
Player of the match: Ramnaresh Sarwan (WI)

- West Indies won the toss and elected to field.
- Gareth Batty, Steven Davies and Amjad Khan (Eng) made their T20I debuts.

== ODI series ==
=== 1st ODI ===
20 March
Scorecard

England; 270/7 (50 overs)	v	West Indies; 244/7 (46.2 overs)
Paul Collingwood 69 (77); Kieron Pollard 2/46 (8 overs)		Lendl Simmons 62 (105); Stuart Broad 3/41 (9.2 overs)

England won by 1 run (D/L)
Providence Stadium, Guyana
Umpires: Aleem Dar (Pak) and Clyde Duncan (WI)
Player of the match: Paul Collingwood (Eng)

- England won the toss and elected to bat.
- Bad light ended West Indies's innings early. West Indies's coach Dyson told his batsmen to take the light after a miscalculation.

=== 2nd ODI ===
22 March
Scorecard

West Indies; 264/8 (50 overs)	v	England; 243 (48.2 overs)
Shivnarine Chanderpaul 112* (134); James Anderson 3/37 (9 overs)		Andrew Strauss 105 (129); Dwayne Bravo 2/40 (9 overs)

West Indies won by 21 runs
Providence Stadium, Guyana
Umpires: Aleem Dar (Pak) and Clyde Duncan (WI)
Player of the match: Shivnarine Chanderpaul (WI)

- West Indies won the toss and elected to bat.

=== 3rd ODI ===
27 March
Scorecoard

England; 117 (41.4 overs)	v	West Indies; 117/2 (14.4 overs)
Dimitri Mascarenhas 36 (76); Dwayne Bravo 4/19 (7 overs)		Chris Gayle 80 (43); Stuart Broad 1/31 (3.4 overs)

West Indies won by 8 wickets (D/L)
Kensington Oval, Bridgetown, Barbados
Umpires: Steve Bucknor (WI) and Steve Davis (Aus)
Player of the match: Dwayne Bravo (WI)

- West Indies won the toss and elected to field.
- Rain reduced the match to 44 overs-a-side.

=== 4th ODI ===
29 March
Scorecard

West Indies; 239/9 (50 overs)	v	England; 136/1 (18.3 overs)
Dwayne Bravo 69 (72); Dimitri Mascarenhas 3/26 (10 overs)		Andrew Strauss 79* (61); Kieron Pollard 1/20 (4 overs)

England won by 9 wickets (D/L)
Kensington Oval, Bridgetown, Barbados
Umpires: Steve Bucknor (WI) and Steve Davis (Aus)
Player of the match: Andrew Strauss (Eng)

- England won the toss and elected to field.
- Rain reduced the England innings to a maximum of 20 overs.

=== 5th ODI ===
3 April
Scorecard

England; 172/5 (29 overs)	v	West Indies; 146 (28 overs)
Kevin Pietersen 48 (48); Sulieman Benn 2/23 (6 overs)		Dwayne Bravo 33 (46); Andrew Flintoff 5/19 (5 overs)

England won by 26 runs
Beausejour Stadium, Gros Islet, St Lucia
Umpires: Steve Davis (Aus) and Norman Malcolm (WI)
Player of the match: Andrew Flintoff (Eng)

- West Indies won the toss and elected to field.
- Rain reduced the match to 29 overs-a-side.
- Andrew Flintoff took a hat-trick with the wickets of Denesh Ramdin (bowled), Ravi Rampaul (LBW) and Sulieman Benn (bowled).

== Tour matches ==
=== St Kitts Invitational XI v England XI ===
25–27 January
Scorecard

England XI	v	St Kitts Invitational XI
424/8d (91.5 overs); Owais Shah 125*; Akito Willett 5/118 (24 overs)		251 (64.3 overs); Codville Rogers 63 (82); Monty Panesar 4/53 (17.3 overs)
265/5d (58 overs); Andrew Strauss 103 (116); Trevier Smithen 1/29 (7 overs)		221 (54 overs); Codville Rogers 79 (83); Monty Panesar 3/51 (15 overs)

England XI won by 217 runs
Warner Park, Basseterre, St. Kitts
Umpires: Luther Kelly (WI) and Wycliffe Mitchum (WI)

- England XI won the toss and elected to bat.
- England XI were originally scheduled to use 11 players, but ended up using 13 after injuries to Andrew Flintoff and Owais Shah. The St Kitts side used 14.

=== First-class: West Indies A v England XI ===
29–31 January
Scorecard

West Indies A (Cricket West Indies)	v	England XI
574/8d (149.5 overs); Lendl Simmons 282 (381); Steve Harmison 4/101 (25.5 overs)		414 (90.5 overs); Andrew Strauss 97 (135); Kevin McClean 3/56 (14.5 overs)
16/0 (5 overs); Adrian Barath 13* (22)

Match drawn
Warner Park, Basseterre, St. Kitts
Umpires: Luther Kelly (WI) and Wycliffe Mitchum (WI)

- West Indies A won the toss and elected to bat.

=== Barbados Cricket Association President's XI v England XI ===
22–23 February
Scorecard

England XI	v	BCA President's XI
351/8d (75 overs); Ravi Bopara 124* (125); Kevin Stoute 4/67 (17 overs)		245 (63.4 overs); Shamarh Brooks 69 (142); Amjad Khan 5/79 (15 overs)
142/2 (27.2 overs); Ian Bell 72 (91); Roston Chase 2/21 (4.2 overs)

Match drawn
Windward Park, Lucas Street, Barbados
Umpires: Vincent Bullen (WI) and Anthony Farrell (WI)

- BCA President's XI won the toss and elected to field.
- The BCA President's XI used 13 players in the match (11 batting, 11 fielding).

=== West Indies Players' Association XI v England XI ===
14 March
Scorecard

England XI; 299/8 (50 overs)	v	WIPA XI; 248 (43.4 overs)
Dimitri Mascarenhas 84*; Atiba Allert 3/59 (10 overs)		Samuel Badree 84*; Steve Harmison 4/59 (8.4 overs)

England XI won by 51 runs
Guaracara Park, Pointe-à-Pierre, Trinidad
Umpires: Terence Birbal (WI) and Peter Nero (WI)
Player of the match: Samuel Badree (WIPA XI) and Dimitri Mascarenhas (Eng)

- England XI won the toss and elected to bat.
- The West Indies Players Association XI used 13 players in the match (11 batting, 11 fielding).
