= English cricket team in the West Indies in 2003–04 =

England in the West Indies in 2003–04
	England	West Indies
- Dates: 1 March – 5 May 2004
Captains	Michael Vaughan	Brian Lara

Test series
- Result: England won the 4-match series 3–0
Most runs	Butcher 296; Thorpe 274; Vaughan 245	Lara 500; Hinds 277; Sarwan 192
Most wickets	Harmison 23; Hoggard 13; Flintoff 11	Best 12; Collins 11; Edwards 10
- Player of the series: Stephen Harmison

One Day International series
- Results: 7-match series drawn 2–2
Most runs	Trescothick 267; Strauss 172; Flintoff 121	Sarwan 216; Chanderpaul 193; Smith 117
Most wickets	Flintoff 5 Anderson 4 Gough 4	Gayle 7 Bradshaw 5 Bravo 4
- Player of the series: Marcus Trescothick

The England cricket team toured West Indies from 1 March to 5 May 2004 as part of the 2003–04 West Indian cricket season. The tour included four Tests and seven One Day Internationals.

== Squad lists ==
Test Squads		ODI Squads	
England	West Indies	England	West Indies
Michael Vaughan (c)	Brian Lara (c)	Michael Vaughan (c)	Brian Lara (c)
Chris Read (wk)	Ridley Jacobs (wk)	Chris Read (wk)	Ridley Jacobs (wk)
Geraint Jones (wk)			
James Anderson	Ramnaresh Sarwan	James Anderson	Ramnaresh Sarwan
Gareth Batty	Chris Gayle	Gareth Batty	Chris Gayle
Mark Butcher	Devon Smith	Ian Blackwell	Shivnarine Chanderpaul
Rikki Clarke	Shivnarine Chanderpaul	Rikki Clarke	Ricardo Powell
Paul Collingwood	Dwayne Smith	Paul Collingwood	Dwayne Smith
Andrew Flintoff	Fidel Edwards	Andrew Flintoff	Tino Best
Ashley Giles	Corey Collymore	Ashley Giles	Sylvester Joseph
Stephen Harmison	Ricardo Powell	Darren Gough	Dwayne Bravo
Nasser Hussain	Tino Best	Stephen Harmison	Ian Bradshaw
Matthew Hoggard	Ryan Hinds	James Kirtley	Mervyn Dillon
Simon Jones	Adam Sanford	Anthony McGrath	Ravi Rampaul
Andrew Strauss	Pedro Collins	Andrew Strauss	Corey Collymore
Marcus Trescothick	Darren Ganga	Marcus Trescothick	
Graham Thorpe			

== Test series – The Wisden Trophy ==
=== 1st Test ===
11–15 March 2004
(Scorecard)

West Indies	v	England
311 (86.4 overs); Devon Smith 108 (188); Ryan Hinds 84 (117); Matthew Hoggard 3/68 (18.4 overs); Stephen Harmison 2/61 (21 overs)		339 (103.2 overs); Mark Butcher 58 (139); Nasser Hussain 58 (158); Tino Best 3/57 (19 overs); Fidel Edwards 3/72 (19.3 overs)
47 (25.3 overs); Ridley Jacobs 15 (22); Devon Smith 12 (42); Stephen Harmison 7/12 (12.3 overs); Matthew Hoggard 2/21 (9 overs)		20/0 (2.3 overs); Michael Vaughan 11* (9)

England won by 10 wickets
Sabina Park, Kingston, Jamaica
Umpires: Billy Bowden (NZL) and Daryl Harper (AUS)
Player of the match: Stephen Harmison (ENG)

- Ramnaresh Sarwan recorded a pair in this test.
- West Indies 2nd innings total of 47 All Out was the lowest innings score by the West Indies, a record which stood until being dismissed for 27 All Out against Australia in 2025.
- Stephen Harmison claimed his best bowling figures of 7/12 in the 2nd innings of the 1st test. It is also the best bowling figures in Sabina Park with figures of 12.3–8–12–7.

=== 2nd Test ===
19–23 March 2004
(Scorecard)

West Indies	v	England
208 (60.1 overs); Chris Gayle 62 (81); Ridley Jacobs 40 (64); Stephen Harmison 6/61 (20.1 overs); Matthew Hoggard 1/38 (15 overs)		319 (133.5 overs); Graham Thorpe 90 (228); Mark Butcher 61 (190); Pedro Collins 4/71 (29 overs); Tino Best 3/71 (28 overs)
209 (67 overs); Ridley Jacobs 70 (92); Shivnarine Chanderpaul 42 (147); Simon Jones 5/57 (15 overs); Andrew Flintoff 2/27 (12 overs)		99/3 (15 overs); Mark Butcher 46* (45); Michael Vaughan 23 (24); Adam Sanford 2/32 (4 overs)

England won by 7 wickets
Queen's Park Oval, Port of Spain, Trinidad
Umpires: Billy Bowden (NZL) and Daryl Harper (AUS)
Player of the match: Stephen Harmison (ENG)

- Restart of lunch on day 1 delayed due to rain.
- Only 30.3 overs played on day 2 due to persistent rain.
- The second test win meant that England retained the Wisden Trophy.

=== 3rd Test ===
1–3 April 2004
(Scorecard)

West Indies	v	England
224 (75.2 overs); Ramnaresh Sarwan 63 (146); Shivnarine Chanderpaul 50 (99); Andrew Flintoff 5/58 (16.2 overs); Stephen Harmison 3/42 (18 overs)		226 (90 overs); Graham Thorpe 119* (217); Nasser Hussain 17 (60); Fidel Edwards 4/70 (20 overs); Pedro Collins 3/60 (23 overs)
94 (42.1 overs); Brian Lara 33 (112); Chris Gayle 15 (14); Matthew Hoggard 4/35 (14 overs); Stephen Harmison 3/34 (15.1 overs)		93/2 (20 overs); Marcus Trescothick 42 (61); Michael Vaughan 32 (33); Corey Collymore 2/24 (7 overs)

England won by 8 wickets
Kensington Oval, Bridgetown, Barbados
Umpires: Darrell Hair (AUS) and Rudi Koertzen (RSA)
Player of the match: Graham Thorpe (ENG)

- Play delayed on Day 3 due to rain.
- Matthew Hoggard claimed a hat-trick in the West Indies 2nd innings. Hoggard got Ramnaresh Sarwan (caught), Shivnarine Chanderpaul (lbw) and Ryan Hinds (caught) in successive deliveries. This was the 33rd hat-trick in Test cricket and the 10th hat-trick for an Englishman.
- On the 3rd Test England secured their first series win against the West Indies in the Caribbean since 1968.

=== 4th Test ===
10–14 April 2004
(Scorecard)

West Indies	v	England
751/5 (dec) (202 overs); Brian Lara 400* (582); Ridley Jacobs 107* (207); Gareth Batty 2/185 (52 overs); Stephen Harmison 1/92 (37 overs)		285 (99 overs); Andrew Flintoff 102* (224); Mark Butcher 52 (83); Pedro Collins 4/76 (26 overs); Tino Best 3/37 (10.3 overs)
		422/5 (f/o) (137 overs); Michael Vaughan 140 (267); Marcus Trescothick 88 (188); Ramnaresh Sarwan 2/26 (12 overs); Ryan Hinds 2/83 (38 overs)

Match drawn
Antigua Recreation Ground, St John's, Antigua
Umpires: Aleem Dar (PAK) and Darrell Hair (AUS)
Player of the match: Brian Lara (WIN)

- Brian Lara's 400 not out is the highest score in Test cricket. His 400 consisted of 582 balls and is the fifth longest innings in Test cricket lasting 778 minutes (12 hours 58 minutes). He hit 43 fours and 4 sixes.
- Brian Lara is the 11th batsmen to hold the world record for the highest score in Test cricket and is the only person ever in Test cricket to regain the world record.
- Brian Lara equaled Don Bradman's record of two treble centuries.
- Brian Lara also scored his 375 (then world record) total in Antigua against England 10 years previously.
- Graham Thorpe was also present in Lara's 375 innings 10 years previously.
- Brian Lara and Ridley Jacobs 282 unbroken partnership is a West Indian partnership record for the 6th wicket.
- West Indies 751/5 is the 7th highest innings total in Test cricket and 2nd highest innings total for West Indies.

== ODI series ==
=== 1st ODI ===
18 April 2004
(Scorecard)

West Indies; 156/5 (30 overs)	v	England; 157/8 (29.3 overs)
Shivnarine Chanderpaul 84 (96); Sylvester Joseph 23 (32); Darren Gough 2/22 (6 overs); Andrew Flintoff 2/22 (6 overs)		Andrew Strauss 29 (46); Chris Read 27 (15); Chris Gayle 3/20 (5.3 overs); Dwayne Bravo 2/31 (6 overs)

England won by 2 wickets
Bourda, Georgetown, Guyana
Umpires: Aleem Dar (PAK) and Eddie Nicholls (WIN)
Player of the match: Chris Read (ENG)

- Play reduced to 30 overs due to rain.

=== 2nd ODI ===
24 April 2004
(Scorecard)

West Indies; 57/2 (16 overs)	v	England
Chris Gayle 20 (42); James Anderson 1/13 (3 overs)

No result
Queen's Park Oval, Port of Spain, Trinidad
Umpires: Darrell Hair (AUS) and Billy Doctrove (WIN)

- Match abandoned after 16 overs due to rain.

=== 3rd ODI ===
25 April 2004
(Scorecard)

West Indies	v	England

Match abandoned without a ball bowled
Queen's Park Oval, Port of Spain, Trinidad
Umpires: Aleem Dar (PAK) and Billy Doctrove (WIN)

- Match abandoned due to rain.

=== 4th ODI ===
28 April 2004
(Scorecard)

West Indies	v	England

Match abandoned without a ball bowled
Queen's Park, St George's, Grenada
Umpires: Darrell Hair (AUS) and Eddie Nicholls (WIN)

- Match abandoned due to rain.

=== 5th ODI ===
1 May 2004
(Scorecard)

West Indies; 284/5 (48 overs)	v	England; 281/8 (50 overs)
Ramnaresh Sarwan 73 (77); Dwayne Smith 44 (28); James Anderson 2/66 (10 overs); Andrew Flintoff 1/32 (9 overs)		Marcus Trescothick 130 (138); Andrew Flintoff 59 (69); Dwayne Bravo 2/57 (8 overs); Ian Bradshaw 2/58 (10 overs)

West Indies won by 5 wickets
Beausejour Stadium, Gros Islet, St Lucia
Umpires: Aleem Dar (PAK) and Billy Doctrove (WIN)
Player of the match: Ramnaresh Sarwan (WIN)

- Ian Bradshaw (WI) made his ODI debut.

=== 6th ODI ===
2 May 2004
(Scorecard)

West Indies; 282/6 (47.1 overs)	v	England; 280/8 (50 overs)
Shivnarine Chanderpaul 63 (55); Brian Lara 57 (68); Gareth Batty 2/40 (9 overs); Rikki Clarke 1/35 (7 overs)		Michael Vaughan 67 (78); Andrew Strauss 67 (82); Chris Gayle 2/39 (10 overs); Ravi Rampaul 1/54 (8 overs)

West Indies won by 4 wickets
Beausejour Stadium, Gros Islet, St Lucia
Umpires: Aleem Dar (PAK) and Eddie Nicholls (WIN)
Player of the match: Shivnarine Chanderpaul (WIN)

=== 7th ODI ===
5 May 2004
(Scorecard)

West Indies; 261/6 (50 overs)	v	England; 262/5 (47.2 overs)
Ramnaresh Sarwan 104* (105); Chris Gayle 41 (52); James Anderson 1/42 (8 overs); Andrew Flintoff 1/45 (10 overs)		Marcus Trescothick 82 (57); Andrew Strauss 66 (86); Ian Bradshaw 2/46 (10 overs); Chris Gayle 1/28 (8 overs)

England won by 5 wickets
Kensington Oval, Bridgetown, Barbados
Umpires: Aleem Dar (PAK) and Billy Doctrove (WIN)
Player of the match: Marcus Trescothick (ENG)

== Tour matches ==
1–3 March 2004
(Scorecard)

Jamaica	v	England
281 (85.2 overs); Mario Ventura 53 (130); Shawn Findlay 51 (86); James Anderson 3/42 (14 overs); Matthew Hoggard 3/47 (15.2 overs)		320 (78.1 overs); Michael Vaughan 105 (89); Nasser Hussain 65 (91); Bevon Brown 3/74 (20.1 overs); Phillip Keating 2/32 (14 overs)
106/6 (36 overs); Shawn Findlay 26 (48); Donovan Pagon 26 (67); Ashley Giles 4/19 (10 overs)		259/6 (dec) (60.3 overs); Paul Collingwood 103 (142); Andrew Flintoff 57 (71); Lorenzo Ingram 2/18 (3.3 overs); Shawn Findlay 1/33 (7 overs)

Match drawn
Sabina Park, Kingston, Jamaica
Umpires: Maurice Chung (WIN) and Melvin Noble (WIN)

5–7 March 2004
(Scorecard)

Vice Chancellor's XI (Cricket West Indies)	v	England
119 (51.2 overs); Jason Haynes 45 (105); Stephen Harmison 4/17 (11 overs); Simon Jones 3/40 (10.2 overs)		274 (79 overs); Nasser Hussain 86 (139); Michael Vaughan 66 (105); Ryan Cunningham 3/37 (11 overs); Phillip Keating 2/32 (14 overs)
70 (24 overs); Kennedy Otieno 22 (49); Simon Jones 3/3 (2 overs); Matthew Hoggard 3/10 (7 overs)

England won by an innings and 85 runs
Sir Frank Worrell Cricket Ground, Kingston, Jamaica
Umpires: Cecil Fletcher (WIN) and Norman Malcolm (WIN)

26–28 March 2004
(Scorecard)

Carib Beer XI (Cricket West Indies)	v	England
129 (48.2 overs); Sylvester Joseph 36; Matthew Hoggard 4/27 (11.2 overs); Ashley Giles 2/25 (15 overs)		347 (102 overs); Graham Thorpe 88; Geraint Jones 66; Jermaine Lawson 4/94 (29 overs); Dave Mohammed 3/114 (28 overs)
229 (78.1 overs); Sylvester Joseph 50; Gareth Batty 5/53 (24 overs); James Anderson 3/56 (18.1 overs)		13/2 (2.4 overs); Rikki Clarke 8* Ravi Rampaul 1/1 (1 over)

England won by 8 wickets
Three Ws Oval, Bridgetown, Barbados
Umpires: Mervyn Jones (WIN) and Tunley Franklyn (WIN)

16 April 2004
(Scorecard)

Guyana	v	England

Match abandoned without a ball bowled
Bourda, Georgetown, Guyana
Umpires: Clyde Duncan (WIN) and Davetirth Anandjit (WIN)

- Match abandoned due to rain.

== Bibliography ==
- Playfair Cricket Annual
- Wisden Cricketers Almanack
