= English cricket team in the West Indies in 2014–15 =

English cricket team in West Indies in 2014–15
	England	West Indies
- Dates: 6 April 2015 – 5 May 2015
Captains	Alastair Cook	Denesh Ramdin

Test series
- Result: 3-match series drawn 1–1
Most runs	Joe Root (358)	Jermaine Blackwood (311)
Most wickets	James Anderson (17)	Jerome Taylor (11)
- Player of the series: James Anderson (Eng)

The England national cricket team toured the West Indies between April and May 2015 for a three-match Test series, preceded by two two-day warm-up matches against a St Kitts Invitational XI.

England announced their squad for the tour on 18 March 2015. Moeen Ali and Chris Woakes were not initially selected due to injuries sustained at the 2015 Cricket World Cup, though Ali joined the squad for the second Test. Uncapped Test players Adil Rashid, Adam Lyth and Mark Wood were included, along with Jonathan Trott, who last played for England in the 2013–14 Ashes series.

The series finished as a draw, which meant England retained the Wisden Trophy they won when the West Indies toured England in 2012. The first Test in Antigua finished as a draw before England won the second Test in Grenada by nine wickets. However, the third Test finished in less than three days after the second day produced 18 wickets, a record for a Test in the West Indies; the home side bowled England out for just 123 runs in the second innings, setting up a five-wicket victory as they chased down a target of 192.

== Background ==
The tour was part of a very full England schedule for 2015, during which they played international cricket every month of the year. England were coming to the West Indies immediately after the 2015 Cricket World Cup in New Zealand and Australia. Additionally, England had a scheduled ODI against Ireland in Dublin three days after the final Test match. The schedule for the Test series was announced in August 2014, with the three Test matches scheduled to take place at: Sir Vivian Richards Stadium in Antigua, the National Cricket Stadium in Grenada, and Kensington Oval in Barbados. Sir Vivian Richards Stadium hadn’t hosted a Test match since 2009, when a Test match between England and the West Indies was cancelled after just ten deliveries had been bowled due to an unsafe outfield. Grenada was also hosting its first Test match since 2009, and this marked the first time that England had ever played an international match at the National Cricket Stadium. England went into the tour in bad form on the back of a disastrous campaign in the World Cup. However, their most recent Test series had been a success, as they defeated India 3-1 in a home series in August 2014.

== Squads ==
Tests
West Indies	England
Denesh Ramdin (c & wk); Kraigg Brathwaite (vc); Sulieman Benn; Devendra Bishoo; Jermaine Blackwood; Carlos Brathwaite; Darren Bravo; Shivnarine Chanderpaul; Shannon Gabriel; Jason Holder; Shai Hope; Veerasammy Permaul; Kemar Roach; Marlon Samuels; Devon Smith; Jerome Taylor	Alastair Cook (c); Moeen Ali; James Anderson; Jonny Bairstow; Gary Ballance; Ian Bell; Stuart Broad; Jos Buttler (wk); Chris Jordan; Adam Lyth; Liam Plunkett; Adil Rashid; Joe Root; Ben Stokes; James Tredwell; Jonathan Trott; Mark Wood

England announced their 16-man squad for the tour on 18 March 2015. One question for England going into the tour was who would open the batting alongside captain Alastair Cook, something that had been a regular issue for the team since the retirement of Andrew Strauss in 2012. The incumbent in the role was Sam Robson, who had played seven Test matches for England in the summer of 2014, but his performances had been mediocre. He played for England Lions in a tour of South Africa in January 2015, where he made only 46 runs in three innings. The main alternatives for England, Adam Lyth and Alex Lees, had also gone on the tour, but neither had done much better than Robson and neither had any Test match experience. Another option was Jonathan Trott, who had not played an international match for England since the 2013-14 Ashes series, when he left Australia early due to a stress-related illness. Trott captained the England Lions on a tour of South Africa in January 2015 and scored an unbeaten 211 in the first unofficial Test match of the series to put himself back into contention to play for England. Although he had originally batted at number 3 for England, this spot was now filled by Gary Ballance, and Trott had said that he was happy to open the batting instead. England decided to leave Robson out of their squad for the tour, and included both Trott and Lyth as options to replace him.

All-rounder Chris Woakes was left out of the touring team due to a foot injury, which had caused him to miss England’s last match of the World Cup. He was replaced in the squad by Ben Stokes. Spin bowler Moeen Ali was also left out because of a side strain he had suffered in the World Cup, so England included Adil Rashid and James Tredwell in the squad. Rashid had not yet made his Test debut, but had played ten limited overs internationals for England until 2009, and Tredwell had only played a single Test match five years earlier. Ali resumed training with his county side, Worcestershire, earlier than expected at the start of April, putting him on track to return to the national side by the time of the second Test match.

== Tour matches ==
6–7 April 2015
Scorecard

St Kitts Invitational XI (Saint Kitts and Nevis)	v	England XI
59 (26.3 overs); Jaison Peters 22 (25); Ben Stokes 3/10 (6 overs)		379/6d (115.2 overs); Alastair Cook 101 (198); Leon Clarke 1/33 (7 overs)
76/7 (35 overs); Akeem Saunders 20* (55); James Tredwell 3/35 (14 overs)

Match drawn
Warner Park, Basseterre, Saint Kitts
Umpires: Wycliffe Mitchum and Carl Tuckett

- St Kitts Invitational XI won the toss and elected to bat.
- Both sides were able to name up to 14 players in their squads, 11 batting and 11 fielding.

England's tour matches were played against a very weak St Kitts Invitational XI, which included several players who had never played a first-class match and a sixteen-year-old. After St Kitts won the toss and elected to bat first in the first match, England dismissed their entire team for just 59 runs before the first session had finished. England then went in to bat with Alastair Cook and Jonathan Trott as their opening pair, and the two survived 50 overs and scored 158 runs before England lost a wicket. Trott scored a half-century and Cook a century, then the rest of England's batsmen had an easy time on the second day as well, with Ian Bell and Joe Root both scoring half-centuries before England declared. England almost managed an unlikely victory in the two-day match, but they couldn't take all ten wickets before stumps. England's bowlers were mostly impressive, and James Tredwell looked to be bowling better than Adil Rashid, making him the more likely of the two to play in the first Test match.

8–9 April 2015
Scorecard

St Kitts Invitational XI (Saint Kitts and Nevis)	v	England XI
303/9d (90 overs); Jonny Bairstow 98 (154); Ben Stokes 3/32 (11.2 overs)		222 (78.1 overs); Ian Bell 43 (72); Quinton Boatswain 2/34 (10 overs)

Match drawn
Warner Park, Basseterre, Saint Kitts
Umpires: Wycliffe Mitchum and Carl Tuckett

- England XI won the toss and elected to field.
- Both sides were able to name up to 17 players in their squads, 11 batting and 11 fielding.
- Jonathan Trott, Gary Ballance, Joe Root and Jonny Bairstow batted for St Kitts Invitational XI in their first innings.
- Liam Plunkett and Mark Wood bowled for St Kitts Invitational XI

The second tour match wasn't a proper match of cricket. The match was set up so that the St Kitts Invitational XI would bat for the entire first day regardless of how many wickets they lost, then England would bat for the entire second day regardless of how many wickets they lost. In an effort to give match practice to as many of England's players as possible, a number of players from England's squad played for both England and the St Kitts XI. Reserve wicket-keeper Jonny Bairstow scored 98 for St Kitts, while Jonathan Trott failed when batting for both sides and Adam Lyth failed when batting for England, throwing into question which of them would bat alongside Alastair Cook in the first Test match.

== Test series ==
=== 1st Test ===
13–17 April 2015
Scorecard

England	v	West Indies
399 (110.4 overs); Ian Bell 143 (256); Kemar Roach 4/94 (29 overs)		295 (113 overs); Jermaine Blackwood 112* (220); James Tredwell 4/47 (26 overs)
333/7d (86 overs); Gary Ballance 122 (250); Jerome Taylor 2/42 (14 overs)		350/7 (129.4 overs); Jason Holder 103* (149); Joe Root 2/22 (13 overs)

Match drawn
Sir Vivian Richards Stadium, North Sound, Antigua
Umpires: Billy Bowden (NZ) and Steve Davis (Aus)
Player of the match: Jason Holder (WI)

- West Indies won the toss and elected to field.
- James Anderson played his 100th Test.
- With the dismissal of Denesh Ramdin in the West Indies' second innings, Anderson overtook Ian Botham's record of 383 wickets as England's leading Test wicket-taker.
- Jermaine Blackwood and Jason Holder (both WI) scored their maiden Test centuries.

Having been put in to bat by the West Indians, England started slowly, losing captain Alastair Cook (11), Jonathan Trott (0) and Gary Ballance (10) in the first session, but the arrival of Ian Bell and Joe Root to the crease with England on 34/3 saw the pair put on 177 runs for the fourth wicket. Root fell 17 runs short of a century when he played a delivery from Jerome Taylor onto his own stumps, but Bell managed to kick on to a century of his own, ably supported from the other end by Ben Stokes, adding 130 runs for the fifth wicket before Bell was caught behind off Kemar Roach for 143 at the end of the penultimate over of the day. Nevertheless, England reached the close of play on day 1 at 341/5.

Stokes only lasted just over five overs into the second day before he was caught in the gully by Jason Holder off Taylor for 79. His dismissal sparked a flurry of wickets for England, losing nightwatchman James Tredwell (8), Jos Buttler (0) and Stuart Broad (0) for the addition of just four runs. Only a late flurry from Chris Jordan (21) and James Anderson (20) kept an air of respectability for the England tail, helping them to a total of 399 by the end of the innings, Roach finishing with figures of 4/94. The West Indian response started in a more measured fashion than England's, but wickets continued to fall at regular intervals, and they were 99/4 by the 38th over. However, Shivnarine Chanderpaul and Jermaine Blackwood were able to help them recover to 155/4 by the end of the day.

Day three started with continued resistance from Chanderpaul and Blackwood, before Chanderpaul offered a relatively simple catch to Stokes off the bowling of Tredwell, falling four runs short of a half-century. After that, Holder was the only tail-ender to offer any resistance to the England bowling, as Blackwood seized control of the innings to record a maiden Test century in only his sixth match. Blackwood finished unbeaten on 112 as he ran out of partners to leave the West Indies all out on 295, 104 runs short of England's first innings total. England's second innings again began with early wickets, losing Trott (4) and Cook (13) within seven overs, followed by Bell (11) shortly after, but a solid partnership between Ballance and Root helped England stabilise their innings on 116/3 by the end of the day.

Both Ballance and Root passed their half-centuries early on the fourth day before Root (59) was bowled by Holder midway through the first session, the pair having added 114 runs for the fourth wicket. In search of a sufficient lead to allow a declaration, Stokes scored a quickfire 35 before he was stumped off the bowling of Sulieman Benn. Buttler then came out and scored an even quicker 59, while Ballance passed 100 runs at the other end. Fifty partnerships for the fifth, sixth and seventh wickets helped England to a total of 333 before the loss of Jordan prompted the tourists to declare. England made an early breakthrough as the West Indies attempted to reach a target of 438, dismissing Kraigg Brathwaite for just five runs, caught by Root at short leg off Broad. Devon Smith and Darren Bravo revived the West Indies run chase, only for Bravo to fall to a superb slip catch from Jordan off Root with just under six overs left in the day, as the home side closed at 98/2.

The final day saw England only manage to take five of the eight wickets required for victory, but two of those fell to Anderson. Playing in his 100th Test match, Anderson first found the edge of Marlon Samuels' bat to equal Ian Botham's England record of 383 Test wickets, before surpassing it with the help of Cook at first slip to dismiss Denesh Ramdin. By that stage, the West Indies were seven down for 294 runs, still 144 away from victory, but with only 19 overs left in the match. England continued to press for the final three wickets, but Holder stood firm on the way to a maiden Test century, and he and Roach batted out the day to end the match as a draw.

=== 2nd Test ===
21–25 April 2015
Scorecard

West Indies	v	England
299 (104.4 overs); Marlon Samuels 103 (228); Stuart Broad 4/61 (24 overs)		464 (144.1 overs); Joe Root 182* (229); Devendra Bishoo 4/177 (51 overs)
307 (112 overs); Kraigg Brathwaite 116 (252); James Anderson 4/43 (22 overs)		144/1 (41.1 overs); Gary Ballance 81* (126); Shannon Gabriel 1/20 (7 overs)

England won by 9 wickets
National Cricket Stadium, St. George's, Grenada
Umpires: Steve Davis (Aus) and Bruce Oxenford (Aus)
Player of the match: Joe Root (Eng)

- England won the toss and elected to field.
- Rain delayed the start of play until 11:45 on day 1 and until 10:45 on day 2.
- To make up lost time, play started early at 09:45 on days 3 and 4.
- Alastair Cook overtook Alec Stewart as England's second-highest Test run scorer when he reached 17 in the first innings.
- Gary Ballance (Eng) reached 1,000 Test runs when he reached 62 in the second innings.
- This was England's first win in an away Test Match since December 2012.

The start of the second Test was delayed by almost two hours due to rain, but when the match finally got started, England put the West Indies in to bat and took the first wicket with the first ball of the third over, James Anderson bowling Kraigg Brathwaite (1) off his pads. They then lost Devon Smith (15) just before the end of the morning session, caught behind off the bowling of Chris Jordan. Darren Bravo (35) and Shivnarine Chanderpaul (1) then fell in quick succession midway through the afternoon session, before Marlon Samuels and Jermaine Blackwood shared a 55-run stand for the fifth wicket as Samuels reached a half-century. Blackwood was trapped LBW by Jordan shortly before the end of play, an original not out decision overturned on review, leaving Denesh Ramdin to join Samuels, who was six short of a century overnight. Samuels later claimed he was inspired to his long innings by Ben Stokes' sledging.

The start of play was again delayed on day 2, but Samuels took little time to complete his century. However, he was out shortly afterwards, caught by Ian Bell at second slip off Anderson, and the West Indies were 223/6. Three quick wickets from Stuart Broad followed, taking Ramdin, Jason Holder and Kemar Roach, before a fifty partnership from Devendra Bishoo and Shannon Gabriel for the final wicket took their score to 299 all out. England had 26 overs left in the day to begin their response, and they managed to close out the day with both Alastair Cook – who surpassed Alec Stewart as England's second-highest Test run scorer – and Jonathan Trott still at the crease, reaching 74/0 at stumps.

To make up for the lost time on the first two days, play started 15 minutes early on day 3. Both Cook and Trott reached half-centuries early on in the day before Trott was caught at second slip by Blackwood off the bowling of Bishoo for 59. Cook batted on to make 76 before he was bowled by Gabriel, and Bell followed in much the same way two overs later, allowing Gary Ballance and Joe Root to take up the reins. The pair put on 165 runs before Ballance was bowled by Samuels for 77. Moeen Ali (0) then ran himself out attempting a single and Stokes (8) holed out attempting to pull Bishoo over deep midwicket, where he was caught by Blackwood. As Stokes walked off, he was saluted by Samuels in response to Stokes' sledging from earlier in the match. Meanwhile, Root passed the century mark and was joined at the crease by Jos Buttler as the day came to a close with England on 373/6.

Play started 15 minutes early again on day 4, but Buttler lasted less than four overs into the day's play, stumped by Ramdin off Bishoo, but Root and Jordan managed a quick 39-run partnership for the eighth wicket before Jordan was deemed to have been just run out by Holder for 16, followed by Broad for a duck after a review found the ball brushed his glove on the way through to slip. Root continued to farm the strike opposite Anderson for the final wicket, only for the innings to be brought to an abrupt end when Anderson was run out, having failed to ground his bat behind the crease when he could have easily saved himself. The wicket denied Root the chance of a double-century, as he finished not out on 182, with England all out for 464. England made an early breakthrough yet again as the West Indies began their second innings, Anderson bowling Devon Smith for 2 runs, but a 142-run partnership between Brathwaite and Bravo restored the West Indies to 145/2 following the dismissal of Bravo by Broad. The home side were on 202/2 at stumps, helped by a century from Brathwaite, leaving them 37 runs ahead of England going into the final day of the match.

Brathwaite made just 15 more runs on the morning of the final day before he fended a ball from Anderson to Root in the gully. The next seven wickets fell for just 76 runs, the majority coming from Samuels (37) and Ramdin (28). Anderson continued to be among the wickets, dismissing both Samuels and Chanderpaul (7), as well as running out Holder with a direct hit for 2 runs. The other four wickets fell to Moeen Ali and Chris Jordan, as the West Indies were dismissed for 307, setting England a target of 143 to win. Although they lost Trott for a duck in the second over, Cook (59) and Ballance (81) were able to steer England to victory with relative ease, as Ballance became the third-fastest England batsman to reach 1,000 Test runs. The win was England's first away from home since December 2012.

=== 3rd Test ===
1–5 May 2015
Scorecard

England	v	West Indies
257 (96.3 overs); Alastair Cook 105 (266); Jerome Taylor 3/36 (18.3 overs)		189 (49.4 overs); Jermaine Blackwood 85 (88); James Anderson 6/42 (12.4 overs)
123 (42.1 overs); Jos Buttler 35* (42); Jason Holder 3/15 (9 overs)		194/5 (62.4 overs); Darren Bravo 82 (148); Chris Jordan 1/24 (11 overs)

West Indies won by 5 wickets
Kensington Oval, Bridgetown, Barbados
Umpires: Billy Bowden (NZ) and Bruce Oxenford (Aus)
Player of the match: Jermaine Blackwood (WI)

- England won the toss and elected to bat.
- Shai Hope (WI) made his Test debut.
- Shivnarine Chanderpaul (WI) played his final test match.
- 18 wickets fell on Day 2, the most in one day of a Test match in the West Indies.
