= West Indian cricket team in England in 1963 =

International cricket tour

The West Indian cricket team in England in 1963 played 30 first-class matches of which they won 15, lost 2 and drew 13. West Indies played five Tests and won the series against England by three matches to one, with one game drawn.

As a result of this success, England's future home Test programme was revised so that West Indies could return in 1966, much earlier than originally planned. This was done by introducing "twin tours", in which two countries would each play three Tests against England in the course of a season.

== The West Indies team ==
- Frank Worrell (captain)
- Conrad Hunte
- Easton McMorris
- Seymour Nurse
- Basil Butcher
- Joe Solomon
- Gary Sobers
- David Allan (wicket keeper)
- Wes Hall
- Charlie Griffith
- Alfred Valentine
- Deryck Murray (wicket keeper)
- Joey Carew
- Willie Rodriguez
- Lester King
- Lance Gibbs
- Rohan Kanhai

== Test series ==
=== First Test ===
6–10 June 1963
Scorecard

West Indies	v	England
501/6d (196 overs); Conrad Hunte 182 (485); Fred Trueman 2/95 (40 overs)		205 (90.3 overs); Ted Dexter 73 (159); Lance Gibbs 5/59 (29.3 overs)
1/0 (0.1 overs)		296 (109.5 overs) (f/o); Micky Stewart 87 (202); Lance Gibbs 6/98 (46 overs)

West Indies won by 10 wickets
Old Trafford, Manchester
Umpires: Charlie Elliott and John Langridge

- West Indies won the toss and elected to bat.
- Joey Carew, Deryck Murray (WI) and John Edrich (Eng) made their Test debuts.
- The match was scheduled for five days but completed in four.

=== Second Test ===
20–25 June 1963
Scorecard

West Indies	v	England
301 (133.2 overs); Rohan Kanhai 73 (156); Fred Trueman 6/100 (44 overs)		297 (102 overs); Ken Barrington 80 (169); Charlie Griffith 5/91 (26 overs)
229 (98 overs); Basil Butcher 133 (261); Fred Trueman 5/52 (26 overs)		228/9 (91 overs); Brian Close 70 (198); Wes Hall 4/93 (40 overs)

Match drawn
Lord's, London
Umpires: Syd Buller and Eddie Phillipson

- West Indies won the toss and elected to bat.
- Rain stopped play on Day 4 from 2:55 to 3:09, and then ended play for the day at 4:45. Play resumed on Day 5 at 2:20.

When time ran out, England were six runs short of the 234 that they needed to win. The ninth wicket fell when Derek Shackleton was run out from the fourth ball of the final over. Colin Cowdrey, who had had his left arm broken earlier in the innings and had retired hurt, reappeared with his arm in plaster; he was not required to face a ball, David Allen playing out the remaining two deliveries.

=== Third Test ===
4–9 July 1963
Scorecard

England	v	West Indies
216 (98.4 overs); Brian Close 55 (175); Garfield Sobers 5/60 (31 overs)		186 (69 overs); Joey Carew 40 (87); Fred Trueman 5/75 (26 overs)
278/9d (105.2 overs); Phil Sharpe 85* (199); Lance Gibbs 4/49 (26.2 overs)		91 (34.3 overs); Rohan Kanhai 38 (73); Fred Trueman 7/44 (14.3 overs)

England won by 217 runs
Edgbaston, Birmingham
Umpires: Charlie Elliott and Laurie Gray

- England won the toss and elected to bat.
- Phil Sharpe (Eng) made his Test debut
- 7 July taken as rest day

=== Fourth Test ===
25–29 July 1963
Scorecard

West Indies	v	England
397 (164.4 overs); Garfield Sobers 102 (242); Fred Trueman 4/117 (46 overs)		174 (54 overs); Tony Lock 53 (66); Charlie Griffith 6/36 (21 overs)
229 (67.1 overs); Basil Butcher 78 (95); Fred Titmus 4/44 (19 overs)		231 (92.4 overs); Jim Parks 57 (109); Lance Gibbs 4/76 (37.4 overs)

West Indies won by 221 runs
Headingley, Leeds
Umpires: John Langridge and Eddie Phillipson

- West Indies won the toss and elected to bat.
- Brian Bolus (Eng) made his Test debut
- The match was scheduled for five days but completed in four.
- 28 July taken as rest day

=== Fifth Test ===
22–26 August 1963
Scorecard

England	v	West Indies
275 (102.2 overs); Phil Sharpe 63 (136); Charlie Griffith 6/71 (27 overs)		246 (104.1 overs); Conrad Hunte 80 (175); Fred Trueman 3/65 (26.1 overs)
223 (81 overs); Phil Sharpe 83 (185); Wes Hall 4/39 (16 overs)		255/2 (95 overs); Conrad Hunte 108* (295); Ted Dexter 1/34 (9 overs)

West Indies won by 8 wickets
The Oval, London
Umpires: Syd Buller and Dusty Rhodes

- England won the toss and elected to bat.
- The match was scheduled for five days but completed in four.
- 25 August was taken as a rest day

== Run and wicket aggregates ==
=== All first-class matches ===
leading batsmen
Conrad Hunte – 1367 runs @ 44.09
Gary Sobers – 1333 @ 47.60
Basil Butcher – 1294 @ 44.62
Rohan Kanhai – 1149 @ 41.03

leading bowlers
Charlie Griffith – 119 wickets @ 12.83
Gary Sobers – 82 @ 22.48
Lance Gibbs – 78 @ 20.05
Wes Hall – 74 @ 21.70

=== Test matches ===
leading batsmen
Rohan Kanhai – 497 runs @ 55.22
Conrad Hunte – 471 @ 58.57
Basil Butcher – 383 @ 47.87
Gary Sobers – 322 @ 40.25

leading bowlers
Charlie Griffith – 32 wickets @ 16.21
Lance Gibbs – 26 @ 21.30
Gary Sobers – 20 @ 28.55
Wes Hall – 16 @ 33.37

== See also ==
- Wisden Trophy
- 1963 English cricket season

== External sources ==
- CricketArchive – tour summaries

== Annual reviews ==
- Playfair Cricket Annual 1964
- Wisden Cricketers' Almanack 1964
