= Clyde Duncan (umpire) =

West Indian cricket umpire (1954–2011)

Personal information
- Full name: Clyde Rory Duncan
- Born: 7 January 1954; Vreed en Hoop, Guyana
- Died: 27 July 2011 (aged 57); Trinidad
- Role: Umpire

Umpiring information
- Tests umpired: 2 (1991–1994)
- ODIs umpired: 21 (1988–2010)
- T20Is umpired: 6 (2008–2010)
- Source: ESPNcricinfo, 5 July 2013

Clyde Duncan (7 January 1954 – 27 July 2011) was a West Indian cricket umpire. Besides umpiring at the first-class level, he stood in two Test matches between 1991 and 1994, 21 One Day Internationals between 1988 and 2010 and six Twenty20 Internationals between 2008 and 2010. The Guyana-born Duncan died of cancer in Trinidad in 2011.

== See also ==
- List of Test cricket umpires
- List of One Day International cricket umpires
- List of Twenty20 International cricket umpires
