= West Indian cricket team in England in 2004 =

	England	West Indies
- Dates: 19 June – 25 September 2004
Captains	Michael Vaughan	Brian Lara

Test series
- Result: England won the 4-match series 4–0
Most runs	Andrew Flintoff (387)	Shivnarine Chanderpaul (437)
Most wickets	Ashley Giles (22)	Dwayne Bravo (16)
- Player of the series: Andrew Flintoff (Eng) and Shivnarine Chanderpaul (Win)

The West Indies cricket team toured England from 19 June to 31 August 2004. The tour began with three one-day matches against county teams, followed by the NatWest Series against England and New Zealand. That was followed by three first-class matches and four Tests.

England won the Test series by 4–0, the first time England has ever won all the Tests in one series against West Indies.

New Zealand won the NatWest Series, beating West Indies by 107 runs in the final.

== Test series ==
=== 1st Test ===
22–26 July 2004
Scorecard

England	v	West Indies
568 (121.4 overs); Rob Key 221 (288); Pedro Collins 4/113 (24 overs)		416 (116.4 overs); Shivnarine Chanderpaul 128* (270); Ashley Giles 4/129 (40.4 overs)
325/5d (76.4 overs); Michael Vaughan 101* (145); Pedro Collins 3/62 (14.4 overs)		267 (79.3 overs); Shivnarine Chanderpaul 97* (152); Ashley Giles 5/81 (35 overs)

England won by 210 runs
Lord's, London
Umpires: Daryl Harper (Aus) and Rudi Koertzen (SA)
Player of the match: Ashley Giles (Eng)

- West Indies won the toss and elected to field
- Rain delayed start on Day 5
- Dwayne Bravo (WI) made his Test debut

=== 2nd Test ===
29 July-1 August 2004
Scorecard

England	v	West Indies
566/9d (134 overs); Andrew Flintoff 167 (191); Dwayne Bravo 4/76 (24 overs)		336 (91.3 overs); Ramnaresh Sarwan 139 (226); Ashley Giles 4/65 (30.3 overs)
248 (65.1 overs); Marcus Trescothick 107 (158); Chris Gayle 5/34 (15.1 overs)		222 (55.3 overs); Chris Gayle 82 (102); Ashley Giles 5/57 (21 overs)

England won by 256 runs
Edgbaston, Birmingham
Umpires: Darrell Hair (Aus) and Simon Taufel (Aus)
Player of the match: Andrew Flintoff (Eng)

- England won the toss and elected to bat

=== 3rd Test ===
12–16 August 2004
Scorecard

West Indies	v	England
395 (94.3 overs); Dwayne Bravo 77 (106); Matthew Hoggard 4/83 (22 overs)		330 (112.2 overs); Graham Thorpe 114 (239); Dwayne Bravo 6/55 (26 overs)
165 (59.4 overs); Ramnaresh Sarwan 60 (126); Steve Harmison 4/44 (13.4 overs)		231/3 (65.4 overs); Rob Key 93* (178); Pedro Collins 1/24 (8 overs)

England won by 7 wickets
Old Trafford, Manchester
Umpires: Aleem Dar (Pak) and Simon Taufel (Aus)
Player of the match: Graham Thorpe (Eng)

- West Indies won the toss and elected to bat
- No play on Day 2 due to rain.
- Sylvester Joseph (WI) made his Test debut.

=== 4th Test ===
19–21 August 2004
Scorecard

England	v	West Indies
470 (123.2 overs); Andrew Flintoff 72 (99); Jermaine Lawson 3/115 (24 overs)		152 (36.5 overs); Brian Lara 79 (93); Steve Harmison 6/46 (13 overs)
4/0 (0.3 overs); Marcus Trescothick 4* (3)		318 (f/o) (84.2 overs); Chris Gayle 105 (87); James Anderson 4/52 (15.2 overs)

England won by 10 wickets
The Oval, London
Umpires: Darrell Hair (Aus) and Rudi Koertzen (SA)
Player of the match: Steve Harmison (Eng)

- England won the toss and elected to bat
- Ian Bell (Eng) made his Test debut
