= West Indian cricket team in England in 2009 =

Events relating to the West Indies cricket team

	England	West Indies
- Dates: 6 – 26 May 2009
Captains	Andrew Strauss	Chris Gayle

Test series
- Result: England won the 2-match series 2–0
Most runs	Ravi Bopara 251	Ramnaresh Sarwan 136
Most wickets	James Anderson 11	Fidel Edwards 7
- Player of the series: Ravi Bopara (Eng) and Fidel Edwards (WI)

One Day International series
- Results: England won the 3-match series 2–0
Most runs	Owais Shah 113	Shivnarine Chanderpaul 95
Most wickets	Stuart Broad 6	Jerome Taylor 4
- Player of the series: Stuart Broad

The West Indies cricket team toured England for a two-match Test series and a three-match ODI series from 6 to 26 May 2009. They toured in place of Zimbabwe following the British government's decision to cut bilateral ties with Zimbabwe.

At the start of the summer, the English players at a meeting identified this West Indian visit as pivotal to their momentum-making efforts for the Ashes later that season.

== Test series ==
=== Squads ===
England	West Indies
Andrew Strauss (c); James Anderson; Ian Bell; Ravi Bopara; Tim Bresnan; Stuart Broad; Paul Collingwood; Alastair Cook; Graham Onions; Monty Panesar; Kevin Pietersen; Matt Prior (wk); Ryan Sidebottom; Graeme Swann	Chris Gayle (c); Denesh Ramdin (wk); Lionel Baker; Sulieman Benn; David Bernard; Shivnarine Chanderpaul; Narsingh Deonarine; Fidel Edwards; Brendan Nash; Nelon Pascal; Dale Richards; Andrew Richardson; Darren Sammy; Ramnaresh Sarwan; Lendl Simmons; Devon Smith; Jerome Taylor

=== 1st Test ===
6 – 10 May
Scorecard

England	v	West Indies
377 (111.3 overs); RS Bopara 143 (284); FH Edwards 6/92 [26.3]		152 (32.3 overs); DS Smith 46 (50); G Onions 5/38 [9.3]
32/0 (6.1 overs); AN Cook 14* (17); FH Edwards 0/12 [3.1]		256 (f/o) (72.2 overs); BP Nash 81 (139); GP Swann 3/39 [17]

England won by 10 wickets
Lord's, London
Umpires: SJ Davis (Aus) and EAR de Silva (SL)
Player of the match: GP Swann (Eng)

- Bad light ended day two early.

Day 1: Ravi Bopara made his second century (at 207 balls), and England closed the day with 289/7. Fidel Edwards took 4 wickets for 53 runs.
Day 2: England closed the first innings with 377 runs. West Indies only scored 152 runs in their innings, and Strauss enforced the follow on. West Indies closed the day with 39/2. Graham Onions, on his Test debut, took 5 wickets for 38 runs.
Day 3 The West Indies finally ended their second innings with a lead of 31 runs. England quickly reached this target, and won the first Test in a series for the first time in 15 attempts. This was also the first win at Lord's since 2005. Chanderpaul ended the match with only 4 runs and a duck, his lowest match total in his career.

=== 2nd Test ===
14 – 18 May
Scorecard

England	v	West Indies
569/6d (147 overs); AN Cook 160 (339); SJ Benn 2/146 [43]		310 (84.3 overs); RR Sarwan 100 (138); JM Anderson 5/87 [26.3]
		176 (f/o) (44 overs); CH Gayle 54 (43); JM Anderson 4/38 [16]

England won by an innings and 83 runs
Riverside, Chester-le-Street
Umpires: SJ Davis (Aus) and EAR de Silva (SL)
Player of the match: JM Anderson (Eng)

- Day 2 was lost to rain
- Bad light ended day three and four early.

Day 1: England won the toss and elected bat. Bopara and Cook scored centuries (108 & 126* respectly). Bopara scored his third consecutive century (all vs West Indies); he is the first Englishman since Graham Gooch in 1990 to achieve this feat. England closed the day on 302 for 2.
Day 2: There was no play on the second day because of rain.
Day 3: Alastair Cook closed his innings with 160 runs, his highest test score, and led to England to 569 for 6, before the declaration by Strauss. West Indies closed the day on 94 for 3, Anderson took 3 wickets for 28 runs.
Day 4: After tea, West Indies ended their second innings with 310 runs and Strauss enforced the follow-on, for the second time in the series. In 22 overs, West Indies scored 115 runs for 3 wickets.
Day 5: After showers limited play at the beginning of the day, England bowled the West Indies out for 176 by the third over after lunch. Paul Collingwood replaced the injured Matt Prior as wicketkeeper, and Anderson took 4 wickets while conceding just 18 runs.

== ODI series ==
=== 1st ODI ===
21 May 2009
Scorecard

West Indies	v	England

Match abandoned without a ball bowled
Headingley, Leeds
Umpires: SJ Davis (Aus) and NJ Llong (Eng)

The first ODI was abandoned at 15:00, after torrential morning rain left the newly relaid outfield saturated.

=== 2nd ODI ===
24 May 2009
Scorecard

West Indies; 160 (38.3 overs)	v	England; 161/4 (36 overs)
DJJ Bravo 50 (58); SCJ Broad 4/46 [8.3]		PD Collingwood 47* (50); DJG Sammy 1/15 [5]

England won by 6 wickets
County Ground, Bristol
Umpires: EAR de Silva (SL) and PJ Hartley (Eng)
Player of the match: PD Collingwood (Eng)

England won the toss and chose to field, bowling strongly and defensively, with Stuart Broad taking four for 46 and Paul Collingwood three for 16 from six overs. Graeme Swann, the England off-spinner, described as "exceptional" the efforts of his seam-bowling counterparts. Shivnarine Chanderpaul and Dwayne Bravo made the best partnership of the West Indian innings with 63 runs for the fourth wicket. Collingwood was unbeaten on 47 in England's innings, as they won the game with 14 overs to spare. The West Indian captain Chris Gayle played his 200th ODI. Eoin Morgan played his first match with England, he previously played 23 One Day Internationals with Ireland.

=== 3rd ODI ===
26 May 2009
Scorecard

England; 328/7 (50 overs)	v	West Indies; 270 (49.4 overs)
MJ Prior 87 (86); JE Taylor 3/59 [10]		S Chanderpaul 68 (108); JM Anderson 3/58 [9.4]

England won by 58 runs
Edgbaston, Birmingham
Umpires: SJ Davis (Aus) and IJ Gould (Eng)
Player of the match: MJ Prior (Eng)

The Englishmen were delighted to bat first, keen as they were to put themselves to the test in the total-setting stakes, and passed with something like aplomb. Swann was especially impressed with and pleased for Matt Prior, whose 87 he dubbed "brilliant". Prior had previously been picked apart for his persistent failure to convert starts into substantial scores. Swann also drew attention to the fact that this constituted England's second successive win without both Kevin Pietersen and Andrew Flintoff, and opined that the team was beginning to look "formidable", having amply fulfilled its goals for the series. "D-day is now looming," he wrote in reference to the Ashes. "I can't wait!"

== Tour Matches ==
=== First Class: Leicestershire vs West Indians ===
20 – 22 April
Scorecard

Leicestershire	v	West Indians
182 (62.3 overs); M Boyce 45 (113); SJ Benn 4/31 [15]		320/6d (99.5 overs); LMP Simmons 102 (195); A Wyatt 3/42 [21]
238/6 (91 overs); M Boyce 55 (142); SJ Benn 2/55 [25]

Match drawn
Grace Road, Leicester
Umpires: MJD Bodenham (Eng) and A Hicks (Eng)

=== First Class: Essex vs West Indians ===
25 – 27 April
Scorecard

Essex	v	West Indians
263 (80.2 overs); J Mickleburgh 58 (117); N Deonarine 3/32 [12.2]		146 (44.1 overs); S Chanderpaul 66* (107); MA Chambers 4/62 [14]
175/3 (47 overs); AN Cook 74* (140); LS Baker 2/31 [9]

Match drawn
County Ground, Chelmsford
Umpires: DJ Millns (Eng) and SJ O'Shaughnessy (Eng)

=== First Class: England Lions vs West Indians ===
30 April – 3 May
Scorecard

West Indians	v	England Lions
203 (64 overs); DE Bernard 58 (85); CR Woakes 6/43 [18]		311 (72.5 overs); TR Ambrose 117 (146); N Pascal 4/68 [15.5]
179 (45.1 overs); LMP Simmons 63 (89); LE Plunkett 4/30 [10.1]		72/0 (9.5 overs); RWT Key 33* (29)

England Lions won by 10 wickets
County Ground, Derby
Umpires: NA Mallender (Eng) and P Willey (Eng)
