= West Indian cricket team in England in 2012 =

Mens cricket tour

	West Indies	England
- Dates: 5 May – 24 June
Captains	Darren Sammy	Andrew Strauss (Tests); Alastair Cook (ODIs); Stuart Broad (T20I)

Test series
- Result: England won the 3-match series 2–0
Most runs	Marlon Samuels (386)	Andrew Strauss (326)
Most wickets	Kemar Roach (8)	Stuart Broad (14)
- Player of the series: Marlon Samuels (WI) and Andrew Strauss (Eng)

One Day International series
- Results: England won the 3-match series 2–0
Most runs	Dwayne Bravo (85)	Ian Bell (179)
Most wickets	Marlon Samuels (2); Darren Sammy (2)	Tim Bresnan (5)
- Player of the series: Ian Bell (Eng)

Twenty20 International series
- Results: England won the 1-match series 1–0
Most runs	Dwayne Smith (70)	Alex Hales (99)
Most wickets	Ravi Rampaul (2)	Steven Finn (2)
- Player of the series: Alex Hales (Eng)

The West Indies cricket team toured England in the summer of 2012. The tour comprised three Test matches, three One Day Internationals and one Twenty20 International. One Test was originally awarded to Cardiff, but this was later awarded to Lord's after Glamorgan County Cricket Club were unable to pay their fee for hosting the 2011 Sri Lanka Test in time.

== Squads ==
Tests		ODIs		T20I	
England	West Indies	England	West Indies	England	West Indies
Andrew Strauss (c); James Anderson; Jonny Bairstow; Ian Bell; Tim Bresnan; Stuart Broad; Alastair Cook; Steven Finn; Graham Onions; Kevin Pietersen; Matt Prior (wk); Graeme Swann; Jonathan Trott	Darren Sammy (c); Kirk Edwards (vc); Adrian Barath; Tino Best^{†}; Darren Bravo; Shivnarine Chanderpaul; Narsingh Deonarine; Fidel Edwards; Assad Fudadin; Shannon Gabriel; Sunil Narine^{†}; Kieran Powell; Denesh Ramdin (wk); Ravi Rampaul; Kemar Roach; Marlon Samuels; Shane Shillingford	Alastair Cook (c); James Anderson; Jonny Bairstow; Ian Bell; Ravi Bopara; Tim Bresnan; Stuart Broad; Jade Dernbach; Steven Finn; Craig Kieswetter (wk); Stuart Meaker^{‡}; Eoin Morgan; Samit Patel; Graeme Swann; James Tredwell^{‡}; Jonathan Trott; Chris Woakes^{*}	Darren Sammy (c); Dwayne Bravo (vc); Tino Best; Darren Bravo; Johnson Charles; Fidel Edwards; Chris Gayle; Sunil Narine; Kieron Pollard; Denesh Ramdin (wk); Ravi Rampaul; Andre Russell; Marlon Samuels; Lendl Simmons; Dwayne Smith	Stuart Broad (c); Jonny Bairstow; Ravi Bopara; Tim Bresnan; Danny Briggs; Jos Buttler; Jade Dernbach; Steven Finn; Alex Hales; Craig Kieswetter (wk); Eoin Morgan; Samit Patel; Graeme Swann	

^{†} Tino Best and Sunil Narine replaced the injured Shannon Gabriel and Kemar Roach for the second and third Test matches respectively.
^{*} Chris Woakes was added to the squad as cover for Jade Dernbach, who was given leave from the second ODI on compassionate grounds, following the death of his Surrey team-mate Tom Maynard.
^{‡} Stuart Meaker and James Tredwell replaced Stuart Broad, Tim Bresnan and Graeme Swann for the third ODI.

== Tour matches ==
=== First-class: Sussex v West Indians ===
5–7 May
Scorecard

West Indians	v	Sussex
90/3 (34 overs); Kieran Powell 35 (71); Chris Liddle 1/10 (6 overs)

Match drawn
County Ground, Hove
Umpires: Paul Pollard (Eng) and George Sharp (Eng)

- Sussex won the toss and elected to field
- No play was possible on Day 1 due to rain.
- Play was reduced to 18 overs on Day 2 due to rain.
- Play was reduced to 16 overs on Day 3 due to rain.

=== First-class: England Lions v West Indians ===
10–13 May
Scorecard

West Indians	v	England Lions
147 (48.5 overs); Darren Bravo 51 (90); Jack Brooks 3/23 (13 overs)		341 (90 overs); James Taylor 118 (179); Ravi Rampaul 3/79 (24 overs)
390 (120.3 overs); Kieran Powell 108 (235); Matt Coles 4/76 (26.3 overs)		197/0 (48.5 overs); Joe Root 115* (143)

England Lions won by 10 wickets
County Ground, Northampton
Umpires: Neil Bainton (Eng) and Steve Garratt (Eng)

- England Lions won the toss and elected to field.

=== Two-day: Leicestershire v West Indians ===
2–3 June
Scorecard

West Indians	v	Leicestershire
150/3 (50 overs); Darren Bravo 66 (97); Nadeem Malik 2/35 (11 overs)

Match drawn
Grace Road, Leicester
Umpires: Mark Benson (Eng) and Russell Evans (Eng)

- West Indians won the toss and elected to bat.
- No play was possible on Day 2 due to rain.

=== 50-over: Middlesex Panthers v West Indians ===
13 June
10:45
Scorecard

West Indians; 335/4 (50 overs)	v	Middlesex Panthers; 107 (31 overs)
Darren Bravo 112* (112); Paul Stirling 1/26 (7 overs)		Josh Davey 24* (36); Chris Gayle 2/0 (1 over)

West Indians won by 228 runs
Lord's, London
Umpires: Richard Kettleborough (Eng) and Steve O'Shaughnessy (Eng)

- Middlesex Panthers won the toss and elected to field.
- Adam Rossington (Middx) made his List A debut.

== Tests (Wisden Trophy) ==
=== 1st Test ===
17–21 May
Scorecard

West Indies	v	England
243 (89.5 overs); Shivnarine Chanderpaul 87* (175); Stuart Broad 7/72 (24.5 overs)		398 (113.3 overs); Andrew Strauss 122 (258); Shannon Gabriel 3/60 (21.3 overs)
345 (130.5 overs); Shivnarine Chanderpaul 91 (250); Stuart Broad 4/93 (34 overs)		193/5 (47 overs); Alastair Cook 79 (127); Kemar Roach 3/60 (13 overs)

England won by 5 wickets
Lord's, London
Umpires: Aleem Dar (Pak) and Marais Erasmus (SA)
Player of the match: Stuart Broad (Eng)

- England won the toss and elected to field.
- Jonny Bairstow (Eng) and Shannon Gabriel (WI) made their Test debuts.

=== 2nd Test ===
25–29 May
Scorecard

West Indies	v	England
370 (109.2 overs); Marlon Samuels 117 (261); Tim Bresnan 4/104 (27 overs)		428 (123.4 overs); Andrew Strauss 141 (303); Ravi Rampaul 3/75 (32 overs)
165 (60.1 overs); Marlon Samuels 76* (160); Tim Bresnan 4/37 (17 overs)		111/1 (30.4 overs); Andrew Strauss 45 (72); Marlon Samuels 1/14 (5.4 overs)

England won by 9 wickets
Trent Bridge, Nottingham
Umpires: Aleem Dar (Pak) and Asad Rauf (Pak)
Player of the match: Tim Bresnan (Eng)

- West Indies won the toss and elected to bat.

=== 3rd Test ===
7–11 June
Scorecard

West Indies	v	England
426 (129.3 overs); Denesh Ramdin 107* (183); Graham Onions 4/88 (29.3 overs)		221/5 (58 overs); Kevin Pietersen 78 (81); Tino Best 2/37 (12 overs)

Match drawn
Edgbaston, Birmingham
Umpires: Kumar Dharmasena (SL) and Tony Hill (NZ)
Player of the match: Tino Best (WI)

- England won the toss and elected to field.
- No play was possible on Day 1, Day 2 or Day 5 due to rain.
- Assad Fudadin and Sunil Narine (both WI) made their Test debuts.
- Tino Best's 95 was the highest score by any number 11 batsman in international cricket.
- Tino Best and Denesh Ramdin shared a West Indies record 10th-wicket partnership of 143 runs.

== ODI series ==
=== 1st ODI ===
16 June
10:45
Scorecard

England; 288/6 (50 overs)	v	West Indies; 172 (33.4 overs)
Ian Bell 126 (117); Marlon Samuels 2/43 (9 overs)		Dwayne Smith 56 (44); Tim Bresnan 4/34 (7.4 overs)

England won by 114 runs (D/L)
Rose Bowl, Southampton
Umpires: Kumar Dharmasena (SL) and Richard Kettleborough (Eng)
Player of the match: Ian Bell (Eng)

- West Indies won the toss and elected to field.
- West Indies innings reduced to 48 overs due to rain, with a revised target of 287 runs.

=== 2nd ODI ===
19 June
10:45
Scorecard

West Indies; 238/9 (50 overs)	v	England; 239/2 (45 overs)
Dwayne Bravo 77 (82); James Anderson 2/38 (10 overs)		Alastair Cook 112 (120); Darren Sammy 2/46 (10 overs)

England won by 8 wickets
The Oval, London
Umpires: Rob Bailey (Eng) and Tony Hill (NZ)
Player of the match: Alastair Cook (Eng)

- England won the toss and elected to field.

=== 3rd ODI ===
22 June
10:45
Scorecard

England	v	West Indies

Match abandoned without a ball bowled
Headingley, Leeds
Umpires: Kumar Dharmasena (SL) and Richard Illingworth (Eng)

- No toss.
- Rain prevented any play.

== T20I ==
=== Only T20I ===
24 June
14:30
Scorecard

West Indies; 172/4 (20 overs)	v	England; 173/3 (19.4 overs)
Dwayne Smith 70 (54); Steven Finn 2/22 (4 overs)		Alex Hales 99 (68); Ravi Rampaul 2/37 (4 overs)

England won by 7 wickets
Trent Bridge, Nottingham
Umpires: Richard Illingworth (Eng) and Richard Kettleborough (Eng)
Player of the match: Alex Hales (Eng)

- West Indies won the toss and elected to bat.

== Statistics ==
England

- Andrew Strauss scored his 20th Test century when he scored 122 in the 1st innings of the 1st Test.
- Andrew Strauss scored his 21st Test century when he scored 141 in the 1st innings of the 2nd Test.
- Stuart Broad took his 150th Test wicket in the 1st innings of the 1st Test.
- Tim Bresnan took his 50th Test wicket in the 2nd innings of the 2nd Test.
- Ian Bell scored his 2nd ODI century when he scored 126 in the 1st ODI.
- Alastair Cook scored his 5th ODI century when he scored 112 in the 2nd ODI.

West Indies

- Marlon Samuels reached 2,000 career Test runs when he scored 117 in the 1st innings of the 2nd Test.
- Marlon Samuels scored his 3rd Test century when he scored 117 in the 1st innings of the 2nd Test.
- Darren Sammy scored his 1st Test century when he scored 106 in the 1st innings of the 2nd Test.
- Shannon Gabriel took his 1st Test wicket when he bowled Matt Prior in the 1st innings of the 1st Test.
- Denesh Ramdin scored his 2nd Test century when he scored 107 not out in the 1st innings of the 3rd Test.
- Tino Best set the record for the highest score by a number 11 batsman when he scored 95 in the 1st innings of the 3rd Test.
