= 2009 Ashes series =

- Part of Australian cricket team in England in 2009
- The npower Ashes Series 2009 logo
- Date: 8 July – 23 August
- Location: England and Wales
- Result: England won the five-Test series 2–1
- Player of the series: Andrew Strauss (Eng) and Michael Clarke (Aus); Compton–Miller Medal: Andrew Strauss (Eng)
Teams
- England: Australia
Captains
- Andrew Strauss: Ricky Ponting
Most runs
- Andrew Strauss (474) Matt Prior (261) Paul Collingwood (251): Michael Clarke (448); Ricky Ponting (385); Marcus North (367)
Most wickets
- Stuart Broad (18) Graeme Swann (14) James Anderson (12): Ben Hilfenhaus (22); Peter Siddle (20); Mitchell Johnson (20)

The 2009 Ashes series was a cricket series between England and Australia, whilst being part of the Australian cricket tour of England in 2009. Starting on 8 July 2009, England and Australia played five Tests, with England winning the series 2–1. England thus regained The Ashes from Australia, who had won the previous series in 2006–07. Andrew Strauss became just the second England captain in 20 years, alongside Michael Vaughan in 2005, to win the Ashes.

The first Test was held at the SWALEC Stadium in Cardiff, the first Test match ever to be held at the ground, and resulted in England saving a draw with one wicket to spare, and Ricky Ponting surpassing 11,000 Test runs, becoming Australia's leading Test run scorer as the series progressed. The second Test at Lord's was preceded by the announcement that Andrew Flintoff would be retiring from Test cricket at the end of the series. The England all-rounder then took his first Lord's five-for to seal a 115-run victory, England's first against Australia at the ground in 75 years. Rain prevented play for large amounts of the Third Test at Edgbaston, including the entire third day, making the draw an inevitable result. Australia pegged the score back to 1–1 with an innings victory at Headingley after bowling out England for 102, their lowest Ashes total since they were bowled out for 77 at Lord's in 1997. This left the Fifth Test at The Oval to decide the series.

Australia began the match needing only a draw to retain the Ashes, but an inspired bowling performance from Stuart Broad to remove Australia for just 160 runs, and a maiden Test century for Jonathan Trott in England's second innings left Australia chasing 546 with two days left to play. An innings of 121 from Michael Hussey gave the Australians hope, but he gradually ran out of partners before losing his own wicket to give England a 197-run win in the match and a 2–1 series victory.

== Background ==
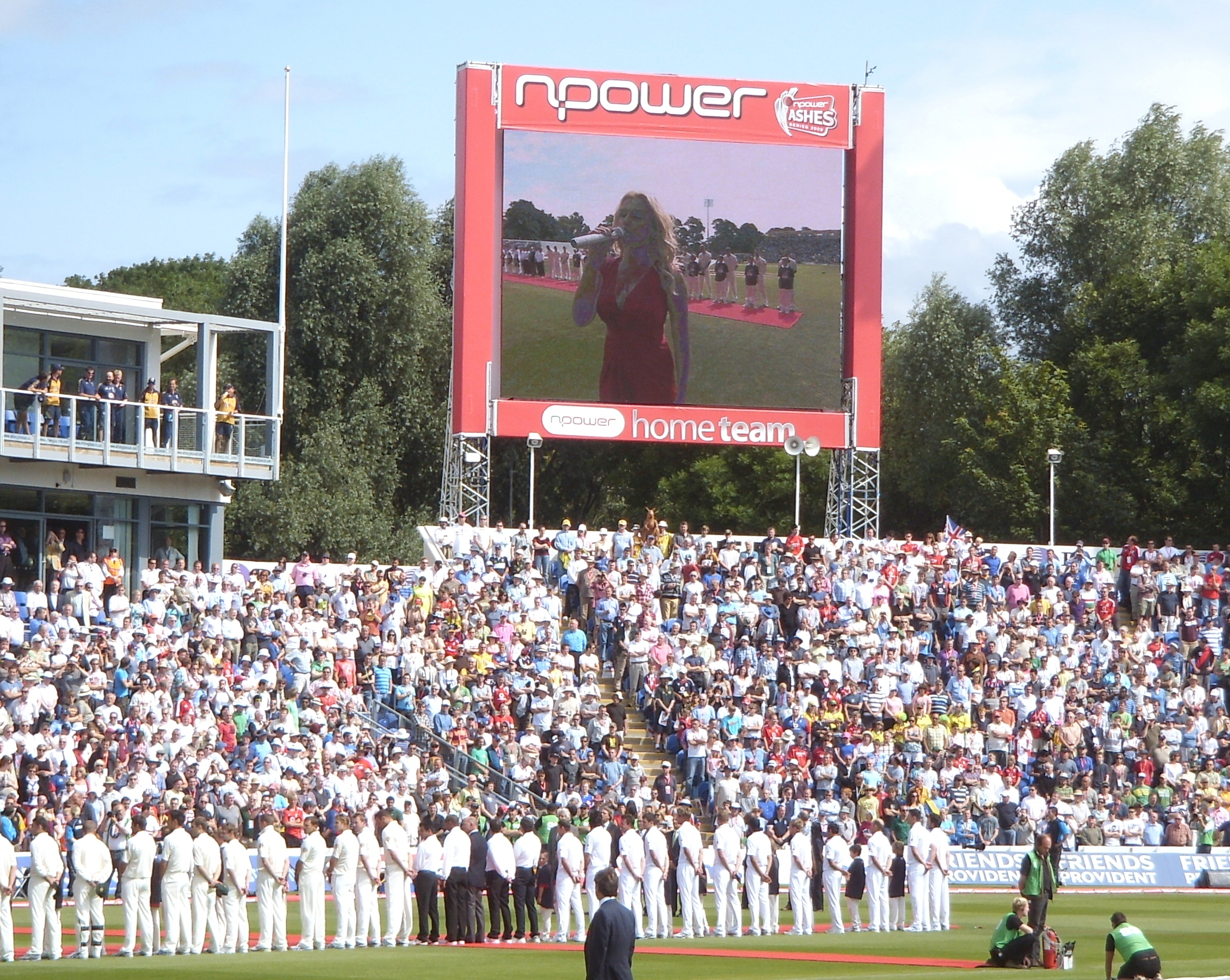
Katherine Jenkins sings the Welsh national anthem before the start of the 2009 Ashes

The 2009 Ashes series began with Australia leading by 31 series to 27, with five drawn series. Australia had won nine of the last 10 Ashes series, including winning the most recent series 5–0 in 2006–07, but the 2005 series, the last to be held in England, was won 2–1 by the home team.

Australia's last two Test series before the Ashes were played against South Africa, the first in Australia and the second in South Africa. Although South Africa won their tour series 2–1, Australia recovered to win the return series by the same scoreline.

Meanwhile, England warmed up for the 2009 Ashes with two Test series against the West Indies, the first in the West Indies and the second in England. The first series comprised five matches and was won 1–0 by the West Indies, but the second only included two Tests, England winning both.

The immediate preparation for the Ashes consisted of the 2009 ICC World Twenty20, held in England in June 2009. Australia struggled in their group, losing to the West Indies and Sri Lanka by seven and six wickets, respectively, and were eliminated at the first hurdle. England also suffered a shock four-wicket defeat to the Netherlands in their first match, but they recovered by defeating Pakistan by 48 runs to qualify for the Super Eights. There, they were paired with South Africa, India and the West Indies, but defeat to South Africa and a narrow victory over India meant that they needed a victory against the West Indies to reach the semi-finals. They lost the match via the Duckworth–Lewis method, and were eliminated.

Australia completed their Ashes preparations with tour matches against Sussex and the England Lions, but both matches finished as draws. Meanwhile, England's schedule was completed with a draw against Warwickshire.

== Squads ==
England	Australia
Andrew Strauss (c); Alastair Cook (vc); James Anderson; Ian Bell; Ravi Bopara; Stuart Broad; Paul Collingwood; Andrew Flintoff; Steve Harmison^{a}; Graham Onions; Monty Panesar^{b}; Kevin Pietersen^{c}; Matt Prior (wk); Ryan Sidebottom^{d}; Graeme Swann; Jonathan Trott^{e}	Ricky Ponting (c); Michael Clarke (vc); Stuart Clark; Brad Haddin (wk); Nathan Hauritz; Ben Hilfenhaus; Phillip Hughes; Michael Hussey; Mitchell Johnson; Simon Katich; Brett Lee; Graham Manou (wk); Andrew McDonald; Marcus North; Peter Siddle; Shane Watson

Notes

- Note A: Steve Harmison was called up as cover for the Second Test after an injury concern regarding Andrew Flintoff.
- Note B: Monty Panesar was dropped for the Fourth Test and allowed to return to his county, before being recalled for the Fifth Test.
- Note C: Kevin Pietersen was dropped from the England squad after the Second Test after undergoing surgery on an injury to his Achilles tendon.
- Note D: Ryan Sidebottom was called up for the Fourth Test squad, taking Monty Panesar's place in the England bowling attack.
- Note E: Jonathan Trott was called up as batting cover for the injured Andrew Flintoff for the Fourth Test.

== Matches ==
=== First Test ===
8–12 July
Scorecard

England	v	Australia
435 (106.5 overs); Kevin Pietersen 69 (141); Mitchell Johnson 3/87 (22 overs)		674/6d (181 overs); Ricky Ponting 150 (224); James Anderson 2/110 (32 overs)
252/9 (105 overs); Paul Collingwood 74 (245); Ben Hilfenhaus 3/47 (15 overs)

Match drawn
SWALEC Stadium, Cardiff
Umpires: Aleem Dar (Pak) and Billy Doctrove (WI)
Player of the match: Ricky Ponting (Aus)

- England won the toss and elected to bat.
- Rain reduced play to 68 overs on Day 3 and to 49 overs on Day 4.

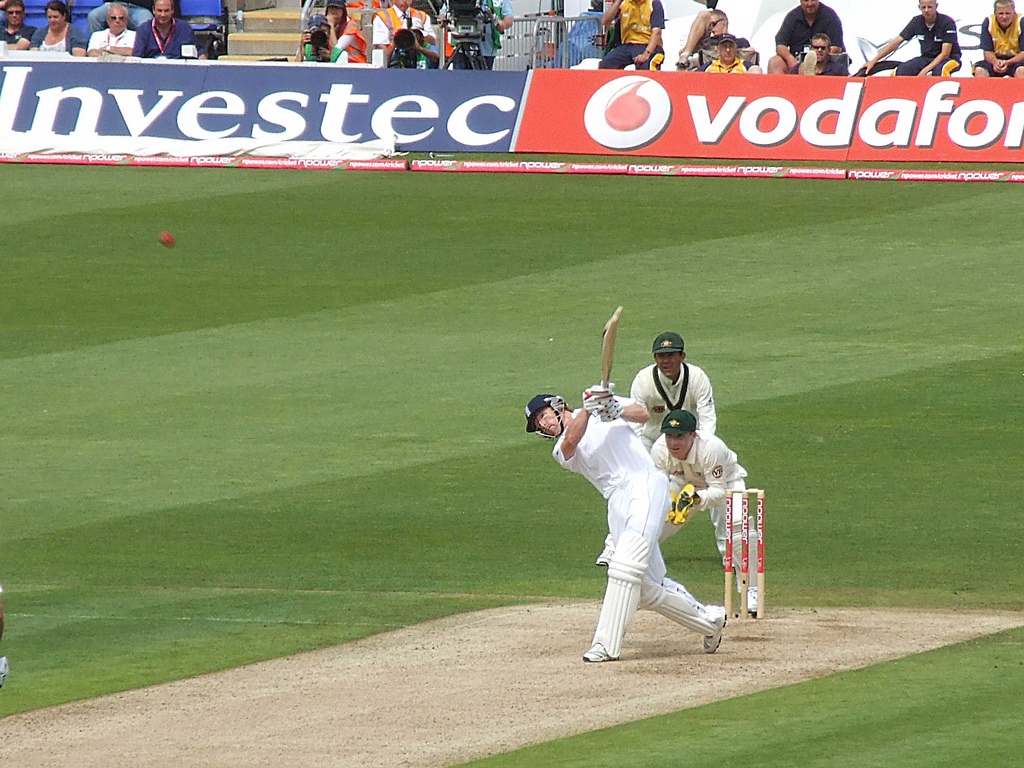
Paul Collingwood batting in the first Test at Cardiff

England won the toss and captain Andrew Strauss chose to bat. England slumped to 90/3 early but recovered with a fine partnership of 138 runs between Pietersen and Collingwood. Hauritz dismissed Pietersen for the crucial fifth wicket when he offered a simple catch to short leg, attempting to sweep from outside the off stump. England ended the day at 336/7 after Siddle picked up two crucial wickets in the last four overs of play.

Swann's unbeaten 47 off 40 balls took England to 435. Australia's openers started brightly facing eight overs before lunch. Flintoff, the fastest bowler in the match, captured the only wicket when Hughes' bottom-edge was well caught by Prior. Katich and Ponting steadily took control with sensible batting. Ponting reached a major milestone in his career scoring his 11,000th run and joining Sachin Tendulkar, Brian Lara and Allan Border. By the end of the day both batsmen had scored centuries, Katich's first against England and their unbeaten partnership of 189 runs had Australia at 249/1 at stumps.

Katich and Ponting added 50 runs to the overnight total before their partnership was broken by Anderson who had been given the new ball earlier. Anderson collected his second wicket of the day (Hussey) when Prior took an easy catch. Ponting was soon to follow, chopping the ball onto his stumps as he attempted a cut shot off Panesar's bowling. After lunch, Australia consolidated their position without losing a wicket and passing England's total and at tea were 458/4. Play was delayed unexpectedly for two hours due to rain and when play resumed it was under lights – the first time artificial light was used in a Test Match in Britain. At stumps Australia were in a strong position with 5 wickets in hand and a lead of 44 runs.

Resuming in fairly muggy, heavy clouded conditions North and Haddin punished the English attack. North reached his deserved century scoring centuries on both his Test and Ashes debuts. At lunch Australia had reached 577/5. After lunch, Haddin became the destroyer-in-chief, flicking three successive Anderson deliveries to the boundary and closed in on his second Test ton with booming sixes off the ineffective English attack. When Haddin was finally dismissed, Ponting declared the Australian innings at 674/6, the largest total against England since 1934 and fourth highest in The Ashes series. In the short time before tea England failed miserably to hold on, losing Cook and Bopara. The rain started as tea was taken and play ended for the day with England 219 runs behind and in dire straits to save the match.

Resuming on 20/2, England lost three wickets in the first 90 minutes of play, collapsing to 70/5 and with a humiliating defeat seeming almost certain. However, Flintoff and Paul Collingwood batted doggedly in response and reached lunch on 102/5. Flintoff tried playing more positively after the interval, with some typical booming boundaries taking his and Collingwood's partnership past 50, before Flintoff edged to Ponting at second slip for 26. Collingwood, meanwhile, continued to provide obdurate opposition to an increasingly hostile Australian bowling attack. Broad was trapped LBW by Hauritz for 14, before Siddle roughed up Swann with some vicious short pitched bowling. However, England continued slowly adding runs and surviving into the final session of the day, before with just 19 overs left in the day and still 18 runs behind, Swann was plumb LBW for a well made 31 to a Hilfenhaus delivery that kept low. Collingwood continued with grim determination, lasting a staggering 245 balls and batting for five hours and 43 minutes before being caught at gully by Michael Hussey for 74, the ninth wicket to fall with England still trailing by 6 runs with just 11.3 overs left in the match. The last man partnership of James Anderson and Monty Panesar not only managed to preserve England's 10th wicket, but crucially managed to bat England into a lead, meaning that two of the remaining overs would be lost to account for the change of innings. With every dot ball cheered, England managed to bat until 18:40 to secure the unlikeliest of draws, ending the day at 251/9, leading by just 13 runs. Australia captain Ricky Ponting later accused the England team of time-wasting by allowing their 12th man, Bilal Shafayat, and physiotherapist, Steve McCaig, to twice run onto the pitch.

=== Second Test ===
16 – 20 July
Scorecard

England	v	Australia
425 (101.4 overs); Andrew Strauss 161 (268); Ben Hilfenhaus 4/103 (31 overs)		215 (63 overs); Michael Hussey 51 (91); James Anderson 4/55 (21 overs)
311/6d (71.2 overs); Matt Prior 61 (42); Nathan Hauritz 3/80 (16 overs)		406 (107 overs); Michael Clarke 136 (227); Andrew Flintoff 5/92 (27 overs)

England won by 115 runs
Lord's, London
Umpires: Billy Doctrove (WI) and Rudi Koertzen (SA)
Player of the match: Andrew Flintoff (Eng)

- England won the toss and elected to bat.
- Bad light ended days 2 and 4. Rain ended day 3.
- First time England won an Ashes test at Lord's since 1934.

England started the day with the news that former captain and talisman Andrew Flintoff was going to retire from Test cricket after the Ashes, Monty Panesar had been dropped in favour of Graham Onions and Steve Harmison had been left out of the squad. England won the toss and chose to bat first. They started exceptionally well with Strauss and Cook opening and going in for lunch 126/0. There was bad luck for the Australians after the interval when Strauss hit a ball back towards bowler Nathan Hauritz who, in trying to take the catch, dislocated his finger. England's pre-lunch form continued into the afternoon, until, with the score 196/0, Cook was dismissed LBW by Johnson just short of his century on 95. England soon lost Bopara for 18 and, from 222/2, England started to collapse: the next four middle order batsmen fell for just 74 with Australia's bowlers looking far better than they had done earlier in the day. Strauss continued past 150 to reach 161 with Broad on 7 going into day 2 and England on a possible shaky 364/6.

England started the way they had finished on day 1 – with fast wickets for few runs. Strauss was eventually bowled out on his second ball of the day for his previous day's total of 161. After that, two quick wickets meant that England were on 378 with only one wicket left. Onions and Anderson started slowly but gathered confidence with a partnership of 47 until Anderson was caught by Hussey ending England's innings on 425 all-out. The Australians had just under an hour before lunch and James Anderson claimed two wickets with the crucial wicket of Ricky Ponting. A 93 run partnership seemed to have the Australians back in the game but 6 wickets for 53 runs put England into a very strong position going into day 3 with Hauritz and Siddle on 3* each.

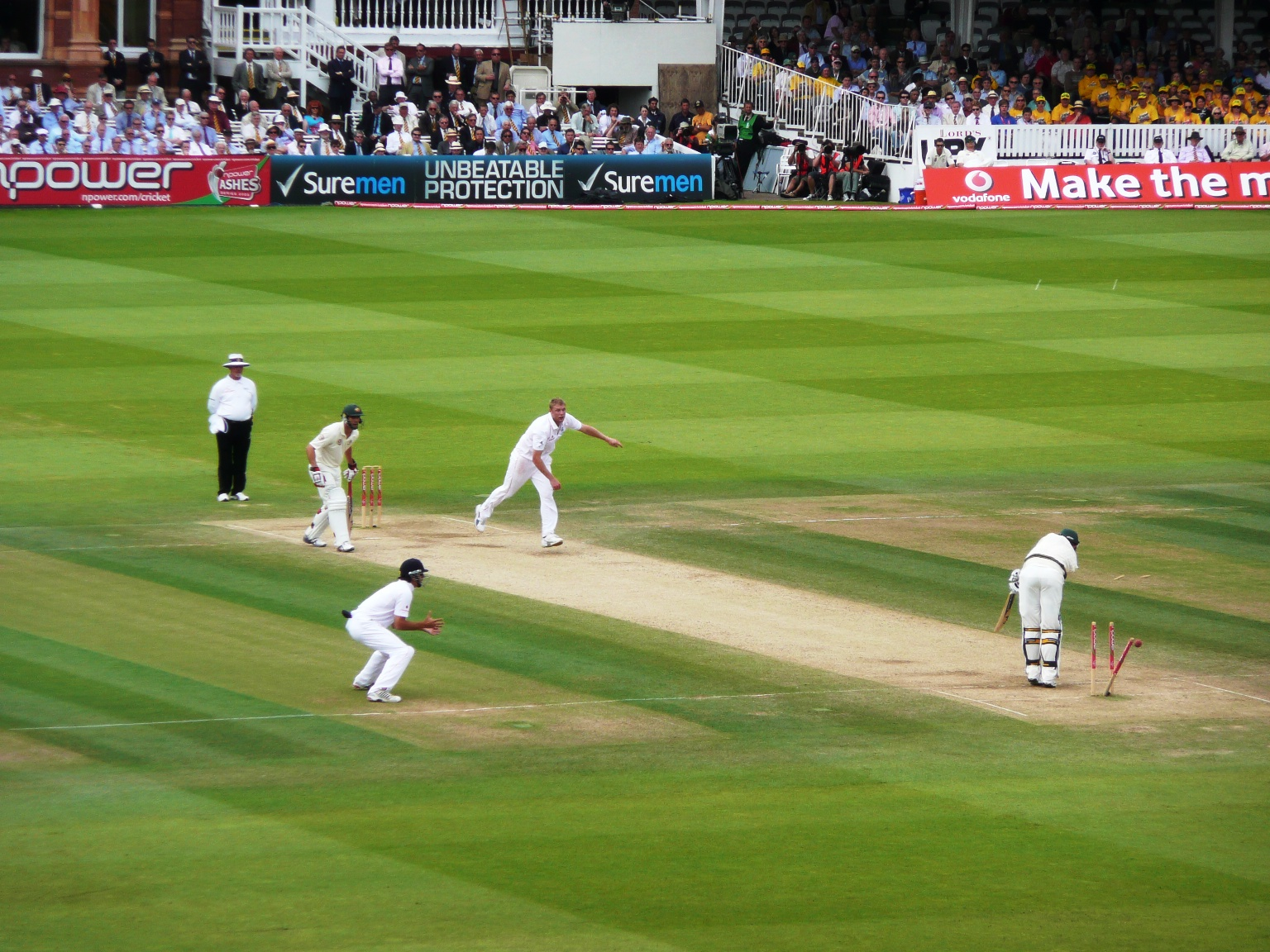
Andrew Flintoff takes his fifth wicket of the match, knocking out Peter Siddle's middle stump to help England beat Australia in the Second Test.

Having bowled Australia out for 215, England decided not to enforce the follow on. In England's 2nd Innings, openers Strauss and Cook started brightly as they looked to score quick runs to increase their lead in the match. After reaching 32 in 42 balls, Cook was trapped LBW by spinner Nathan Hauritz while England were on 61. Strauss fared little better against Hauritz and was out against him shortly afterwards by a catch from Michael Clarke. These two wickets brought Bopara and Pietersen to the crease and also signalled a slowing of the run rate. This partnership lasted 28 overs when Hauritz, showing few ill-effects from his dislocated middle finger on Day 1, got another England wicket. Simon Katich caught Bopara for 27 from 93 balls. When Pietersen fell 7 overs later, caught behind to Siddle, the score 174 for 4. It was left to Collingwood and wicketkeeper Prior to accelerate the run-rate for England. Matt Prior in particular enjoyed success hitting a quick-fire 61 off 42 balls (an innings which included 9 boundaries) until he was dismissed run out by a quick piece of fielding from Marcus North. Upon Prior's dismissal came Andrew Flintoff, playing in his last test for England at Lord's. Flintoff with Collingwood made a fifty partnership in 8 overs with Collingwood reaching his half-century. When Collingwood was dismissed caught behind off Siddle, Stuart Broad came on as next batsman but failed to face a ball as the umpires stopped play due to rain. Almost immediately afterwards, heavy showers meant that play was abandoned for the day with England 311 for 6, a lead over Australia of 521.

Play was delayed due to early showers until 11:15. Andrew Strauss immediately declared England's second innings closed on 311 for 6, leaving Australia a target of 522 to win in two days of play. England started strongly, reducing Australia to 128/5, but a counter-attack by Michael Clarke and Brad Haddin brought Australia back into the game, reaching 313/5 at the close of play, with an outside chance of reaching the target of 522. The highest total ever to have been reached by a test team in the fourth innings to win was 418 (West Indies vs Australia, 2002–03 at St John's).

Requiring another 209 runs to win, Australia hopes were high with Michael Clarke on 136 and Brad Haddin on 80. England broke the partnership early when Andrew Flintoff made Haddin edge one to Paul Collingwood. Graeme Swann then bowled Clarke with his first ball of the day, and Flintoff then bowled both Nathan Hauritz and Peter Siddle to claim his first five-wicket-haul at Lord's, on his final appearance as a Test player at the ground. The feat also meant he became one of the few players to grace both Lord's Honours Boards (because of the 142 he made against South Africa six years prior). With only one wicket left, Mitchell Johnson aggressively powered to 63 before he was clean-bowled by Swann to wrap up England's first Ashes Test victory at Lord's since 1934 at 12:42.

=== Third Test ===
30 July – 3 August
Scorecard

Australia	v	England
263 (70.4 overs); Shane Watson 62 (106); James Anderson 5/80 (24 overs)		376 (93.3 overs); Andrew Flintoff 74 (79); Ben Hilfenhaus 4/109 (30 overs)
375/5 (112.2 overs); Michael Clarke 103* (192); Stuart Broad 2/38 (16 overs)

Match drawn
Edgbaston Cricket Ground, Birmingham
Umpires: Aleem Dar (Pak) and Rudi Koertzen (SA)
Player of the match: Michael Clarke (Aus)

- Australia won the toss and elected to bat.
- Rain delayed start of Day 1; bad light delayed play on Day 2; rain prevented play on Day 3 and delayed start of Day 4

Australia chose to bat first after winning the toss. Play began at 17:00 after a long rain delay. At the start of the day, Australian opener Phillip Hughes announced via his Twitter page that he had been dropped from the team. His replacement, all-rounder Shane Watson, put on 85 runs for the first wicket with Simon Katich before Katich was trapped LBW in Graeme Swann's first over. Over the course of the day's 30 overs, Watson accrued 62 runs not out as Australia finished the day at 126/1.

England started the day in fine form as Graham Onions removed Shane Watson and Michael Hussey with the first two balls of the day, before taking the wicket of Ricky Ponting soon after as the Australian captain tried to hook a quick bouncer. The Australians only added another 30 runs before James Anderson took the next wicket, sparking a sequence of four Anderson wickets in four overs for just 10 runs. Anderson and Onions shared the last two wickets between them as Nathan Hauritz and Ben Hilfenhaus put on 34 for the tenth wicket. England opened their innings with the momentum in their favour, but they had to face the same batting conditions as the Australians had, and Alastair Cook was removed for a duck in the second over. Ravi Bopara was the next to fall as he continued his poor run of form and put on just 23 runs. However, Andrew Strauss and Ian Bell batted until the end of the day to take England into the third day at 116/2.

Heavy overnight rain left the pitch unplayable on Day 3. The umpires examined the pitch at 12:00 and 14:30, by which time large puddles had formed, forcing play to be abandoned for the day.

The fourth day began in the same fashion as the first three had: with a one-hour delay for rain. Play eventually got underway at 12:00, but the partnership only lasted another eight overs, as Strauss was caught behind by Graham Manou off Hilfenhaus. Collingwood was next to fall to Hilfenhaus, caught by Ponting at second slip with the last ball before lunch. Bell reached his half-century just after lunch, but was trapped LBW by Johnson five overs later. Matt Prior and Andrew Flintoff then developed a strong partnership, putting on 89 runs for the sixth wicket. Flintoff and Stuart Broad then combined for another 52 runs before Flintoff was caught out by a Nathan Hauritz ball that spat out of the rough and caught him on the glove. The last three wickets went for 66 runs, with Broad top-scoring with 55 to take England to 376 all out, 113 runs ahead of the Aussies. The Australian innings began well, with the openers putting on 47 runs before two quick wickets fell to Onions and Swann in consecutive overs: Katich edged Onions to Prior, and then Swann tormented Ponting before clean-bowling him with the last ball of his over. The day ended with Australia on 88/2.

The final day of the Third Test was the only day on which play began on schedule. Victory was a definite possibility for both teams, but England's 25-run lead gave them a slight advantage despite the time constraints. Australia drew level with England in the 10th over of the day, with both batsmen heading towards half-centuries. Watson was the first to reach 50, but was out off his next ball, edging the last ball of Anderson's first over of the day to Prior. Hussey was next to reach 50; however, he only put on 14 more before himself edging to Prior off Broad, in only Broad's second over of the innings. Australia's fifth-wicket partnership proved largely impenetrable for the remainder of the day, as Clarke and North pushed towards centuries and Australia towards a 200-run lead in the evening session. North looked the most likely to reach his century first, but – when still on 96 – he mistimed a drive that Anderson caught spectacularly at gully. Clarke then took another eight overs to reach his century with a four off Bopara, at which the two captains agreed to end the match as a draw.

=== Fourth Test ===
7 – 9 August
Scorecard

England	v	Australia
102 (33.5 overs); Matt Prior 37* (43); Peter Siddle 5/21 (9.5 overs)		445 (104.1 overs); Marcus North 110 (206); Stuart Broad 6/91 (25.1 overs)
263 (61.3 overs); Graeme Swann 62 (72); Mitchell Johnson 5/69 (19.3 overs)

Australia won by an innings and 80 runs
Headingley Cricket Ground, Leeds
Umpires: Asad Rauf (Pak) and Billy Bowden (NZ)
Player of the match: Marcus North (Aus)

- England won the toss and elected to bat.

England won the toss and decided to bat first. However, within four overs they were already a wicket down as Andrew Strauss was caught for just three runs. He was then followed by Ravi Bopara (1), Ian Bell (8) and Paul Collingwood (0) before the end of the 19th over. Alastair Cook had managed to stay in throughout all this, but he was soon caught on 30 runs by Michael Clarke off Stuart Clark. After Cook's wicket, only Matt Prior offered any resistance, finishing the innings on 37 not out, while the five bowlers scored just six runs between them, three of them getting ducks. Although England responded well by getting Simon Katich out for a duck off series debutant Steve Harmison, the Australian innings began to gather pace and they were 69/1 off 15 overs by tea. The Australian second wicket partnership reached its century, but then three wickets came in relatively quick succession as Shane Watson fell for 51, Ricky Ponting for 78 and Michael Hussey for just 10 in the space of three overs. Australia finished the day on 196/4, with Michael Clarke on 34 and Marcus North on 7.

Resuming with a 94 run lead Clarke and North extended their partnership to 152 runs before it was broken by Graham Onions. After the lunch break, North continued with good support from the Australian tail and reached his century with a six. Clark was the best of the others with three sixes in his score of 32 (22 deliveries), and Australia finished with a total of 445. Stuart Broad recorded his best Test effort with figures of six wickets for 91 runs. The English openers started comfortably in the quest to erase the 343 run deficit. But just as it seemed they were in control, Ben Hilfenhaus struck twice in two balls, first removing Strauss with a ball that swung in subtly and then Bopara was dismissed for leg before, despite replays showing a deft inside edge onto his pad. Johnson produced a spell of left arm swing bowling that captured the prime wickets of Bell (3), Collingwood (4) and opener Cook. Nightwatchman Anderson was left with Prior at stumps with England in trouble at 82/5, still 261 runs behind Australia's total.

Hilfenhaus dismissed Anderson with the third ball of the third day, when the batsman nicked a short ball outside off stump and was caught at second slip by Ponting. It came the delivery after Anderson scored a 4. Prior and Broad added a further 34 runs before Hilfenhaus had Prior taken behind by a diving Haddin. Broad and Swann then took the attack to the Australian bowlers, at one point taking 47 off 2.4 overs. Their eighth-wicket partnership of 108 from 79 balls was the second-fastest century stand in Test history, behind Kiwis Nathan Astle and Chris Cairns against England in 2002 (118 from 65 balls). Broad was out with the score at 228/8 attempting to hit a boundary off a wide delivery from Johnson and was caught by Watson in the deep. After lunch, Harmison continued to frustrate the Australian bowlers with 19 from 28 deliveries, until Swann (62) and Onions (0) fell to Johnson, and the innings concluded after 61.3 overs at 263 to give Australia a victory by an innings and 80 runs.

=== Fifth Test ===
20 – 24 August
Scorecard

England	v	Australia
332 (90.5 overs); Ian Bell 72 (137); Peter Siddle 4/75 (21 overs)		160 (52.5 overs); Simon Katich 50 (107); Stuart Broad 5/37 (12 overs)
373/9d (95 overs); Jonathan Trott 119 (193); Marcus North 4/98 (30 overs)		348 (102.2 overs); Michael Hussey 121 (263); Graeme Swann 4/120 (40.2 overs)

England won by 197 runs
The Oval, London
Umpires: Asad Rauf (Pak) and Billy Bowden (NZ)
Player of the match: Stuart Broad (Eng)

- England won the toss and elected to bat.
- Rain delayed start of afternoon session on Day 2 until 14:30.
- England regain the Ashes.

With a 10-day break between the 4th and 5th Tests, England looked at their squad following their batting performances at Headingley. Many names were thrown up as possible replacements for the failing middle order of Bopara, Bell and Collingwood, including Jonathan Trott and Rob Key, as well as Mark Ramprakash, whose last test came in 2002, and Marcus Trescothick, who then ruled himself out of the running. The fitness of Andrew Flintoff was also questioned, as many commentators said that he would have to play if England were to win the Test. Flintoff remained in the squad, the only change being the introduction of Trott for Bopara, with the confirmation that the South African-born batsman would make his Test debut at The Oval.

England won the toss and captain Andrew Strauss chose to bat on a pitch quite uncharacteristic of what would be considered normal at The Oval. Although they lost Alastair Cook to an outside edge off Peter Siddle early in the innings, England recovered to reach 108/1 at lunch, with Strauss making his fifty in just 89 balls. However, the captain put on just five more after the break before being caught behind by wicket-keeper Brad Haddin. The next two wickets fell to Siddle in relatively quick succession: Paul Collingwood was caught at mid-on by Michael Hussey, before Ian Bell – who had reached his half-century off 73 balls – inside-edged onto his own stumps for 72. In came debutant Jonathan Trott, who took 12 balls to open his Test scoring tally, and continued to score slowly as he lost partners in Matt Prior and Andrew Flintoff, who made just seven runs in the first innings of his final Test match to take England to 247/6. Trott himself was next to fall, run out by Simon Katich: Trott clipped the ball to the leg side, but Katich made a smart stop and, with just one to aim at, threw the ball at the stumps, catching Trott well out of his ground. The eighth wicket stood for another 39 runs, when Graeme Swann was caught behind off Siddle for the Australian's fourth wicket of the innings, and with that play was closed for the day with England at 307/8.

England added just 25 more runs for their last two wickets at the start of Day 2, Hilfenhaus trapping Anderson LBW for 0 in the second over of the day (ending his 54 innings sequence without a duck), before dismissing Broad for 37. Shane Watson and Simon Katich took Australia to 66/0 before rain forced lunch to be taken three minutes early, with the resumption of play delayed until almost 14:30. After lunch the Australian openers lasted just two overs before the start of a massive Broad-inspired batting collapse. First to fall was Watson, LBW on 34, then Ricky Ponting was deceived by a cutter from Broad and played onto his own stumps for just eight runs. Michaels Hussey and Clarke were next to go, Hussey LBW for a duck, before Clarke was caught low at short extra cover by Jonathan Trott. After a spell in which Broad took four wickets for just eight runs, Swann returned to the attack and immediately took the wicket of Marcus North, although replays subsequently showed that the Australian number 6 got an inside edge to the ball before it struck his pad. Katich reached his half-century in the 37th over of the innings, but was out the very next ball, caught by Alastair Cook at short leg. Broad completed his five-wicket haul in the 39th over, bowling Brad Haddin to give him wicket-to-wicket figures of 5/19 and leave only the Australian bowlers to dismiss. Swann took the next two wickets – albeit that of Stuart Clark was given incorrectly – leaving it to Flintoff to bowl Hilfenhaus and end the Australian innings for 160 runs. The English openers returned to the crease and put on 27 before Cook edged North to first slip for just nine. Mitchell Johnson then combined well with Simon Katich at short leg for the next two wickets, Katich catching Bell low before Johnson thumped a bouncer into Collingwood, looping the ball up for Katich to catch easily, leaving the home team at 39/3. Nevertheless, Strauss and Trott recovered well to take England into the third day at 58/3.

Strauss and Trott built a partnership of 118 before the England captain edged to Michael Clarke at first slip just before the lunch break on day three. With the final ball of the morning session, Prior drove a ball from North to the off side and hit Ricky Ponting at silly point square in the jaw. The Australian captain, looked nonplussed, simply spat out some blood. After lunch, Prior was run out while attempting to sneak a run, despite hitting the ball straight to Katich, who threw down the stumps at the bowler's end. The next man in was Andrew Flintoff, playing in his final Test innings, and he added 22 off 18 before being caught on the long-on boundary. A lofted straight drive from England's most promising all-round prospect, Stuart Broad, brought up the 400 lead, but an attempted slog found his top edge and he was caught by Ponting off North for 29. Meanwhile, Trott progressed towards his maiden Test century, ably supported by Graeme Swann, who reached his half-century in just 44 balls. However, the England spinner was eventually caught behind, top-edging a pull shot off a bouncer from Hilfenhaus. Trott then became the 18th England cricketer to make a century on debut with a four off Hilfenhaus's next over, but he and Anderson only managed to add another 31 before Trott was caught by North at point off Stuart Clark, prompting a declaration from Andrew Strauss. England's score of 373/9 declared meant that in order to win the match Australia would need to make 546 runs in just over two days on a pitch that had not yet produced more than 400 over the course of the match. Meanwhile, England had just over two days to take all 10 Australian second-innings wickets in order to successfully win the match and regain the Ashes. The Australian openers managed to get to 80 without loss by the end of play.

Starting Day 4 at 80/0, Australia lost both Simon Katich and Shane Watson LBW in quick succession within the first five overs: Katich deceived by an arm-ball from Swann, and Watson trapped on the crease by Broad. In reply, Ponting and Hussey then built an impressive partnership, batting beautifully on their way to a stand of 127 runs as the game moved into the afternoon session; it was progressively looking like the pair might possibly be able to give Australia an outside of chasing down the mammoth target. However, in an eerie reminiscence of the famous 2005 Ashes series, Ponting was then run out by a direct hit from Andrew Flintoff fielding at mid-off. Commentating for Sky Sports, Shane Warne, Ponting's former teammate, was left completely stunned, as he couldn't believe that Ponting had committed such an error at such a crucial stage of the match.

It turned out to be the turning point of the match and, arguably, the series. Michael Clarke was then run out in the very next over following some sharp fielding from Andrew Strauss at slip, while Marcus North was next to go when he left his ground to reach for a Graeme Swann delivery but missed, allowing keeper Matt Prior to stump him before he could get back. Hussey and Haddin steadied the Australian innings somewhat, but both rode their luck: Hussey survived when Collingwood inexplicably dropped a sitter off Swann's bowling, whilst Haddin chipped one to midwicket that burst through Onions' hands. Hussey reached a well deserved century, his first century in 28 Test innings, but Haddin was then out shortly after for 34, attempting an ill-advised hoik over mid-wicket, where he was caught in the deep by Strauss. Harmison took the wicket of Mitchell Johnson for a duck in the next over, Collingwood taking a superb catch at second slip, and then removed Siddle and Clark in consecutive balls, caught by Flintoff and Cook respectively. Hilfenhaus survived the hat-trick ball, but the match only lasted another two overs as Hussey was caught by Cook at short leg off the bowling of Swann. England won the match by 197 runs, claiming a 2–1 series win and successfully regaining the Ashes.

== Statistics ==
=== Individual ===
Statistic	England		Australia	
Most series runs	Andrew Strauss	474	Michael Clarke	448
Highest innings	Andrew Strauss	161	Ricky Ponting	150
Most centuries	Andrew Strauss; Jonathan Trott	1	Michael Clarke; Marcus North	2
Most fifties	Andrew Strauss	3	Michael Clarke	2
Most wickets	Stuart Broad	18	Ben Hilfenhaus	22
Most five-wicket hauls	Stuart Broad	2	Peter Siddle; Mitchell Johnson	1
Best innings figures	Stuart Broad	25.1–6–91–6	Peter Siddle	9.5–0–21–5
Best match figures	Graeme Swann	54.2–11–158–8	Peter Siddle	21.5–2–71–6
Most catches (wicket-keepers excluded)	Alastair Cook	7	Ricky Ponting	11
Most stumpings	Matt Prior	1	none	

=== Team ===
Statistic	England	Australia
Highest team innings	435	674/6d
Lowest team innings	102	160
Tosses won	4	1

=== Other ===
- Ricky Ponting reached 11,000 Test runs when he reached 40 in the first innings of the First Test.
- Andrew Strauss reached 5,000 Test runs when he reached 161 in the first innings of the Second Test.
- Mitchell Johnson reached 100 Test wickets when he took the first innings wicket of Alastair Cook in the Second Test.

== See also ==
- Australian women's cricket team in England in 2009
