= Australian cricket team in England and Scotland in 2009 =

Australian cricket team in England in 2009
	England	Australia
- Dates: 1 June – 20 September 2009
Captains	Andrew Strauss (Test & ODI); Paul Collingwood (T20I)	Ricky Ponting (Test & ODI); Michael Clarke (T20I)

Test series
- Result: England won the 5-match series 2–1
Most runs	Andrew Strauss (474)	Michael Clarke (448)
Most wickets	Stuart Broad (18)	Ben Hilfenhaus (22)
- Player of the series: Andrew Strauss (Eng) and Michael Clarke (Aus)

One Day International series
- Results: Australia won the 7-match series 6–1
Most runs	Andrew Strauss (267)	Cameron White (260)
Most wickets	Graeme Swann (9)	Brett Lee (12)
- Player of the series: Cameron White (Aus)

Twenty20 International series
- Results: 2-match series drawn 0–0
Most runs	Ravi Bopara (1)	Cameron White (55)
Most wickets	Paul Collingwood (2)	Mitchell Johnson (1)

The Australia national cricket team toured Great Britain to play a series of cricket matches during the 2009 English cricket season. The team played five Test matches – one in Wales – seven One Day Internationals and two Twenty20 Internationals against England. The Australians also played four other first-class matches in England, against the England Lions and two county sides. Australia also took part in the 2009 ICC World Twenty20 but they were eliminated in the first round after defeats to the West Indies and Sri Lanka.

The series of five Test matches between England and Australia was for The Ashes and, for the first time, a Test match was held in the capital of Wales, Cardiff. Australia was the holder of The Ashes trophy, having won the 2006–07 series 5–0. England won the last series to be held in England in 2005 and won the 2009 Ashes 2–1. The Twenty20 International series was drawn 0–0 as bad weather meant that neither match produced a result.

== Squads ==
Tests		ODIs		T20Is	
England	Australia	England	Australia	England	Australia
Andrew Strauss (c); James Anderson; Ian Bell; Ravi Bopara; Stuart Broad; Paul Collingwood; Alastair Cook; Andrew Flintoff; Steve Harmison; Graham Onions; Monty Panesar; Kevin Pietersen; Matt Prior (wk); Ryan Sidebottom; Graeme Swann; Jonathan Trott	Ricky Ponting (c); Michael Clarke; Stuart Clark; Brad Haddin (wk); Nathan Hauritz; Ben Hilfenhaus; Phillip Hughes; Michael Hussey; Mitchell Johnson; Simon Katich; Brett Lee; Graham Manou (wk); Andrew McDonald; Marcus North; Peter Siddle; Shane Watson	Andrew Strauss (c); James Anderson; Ravi Bopara; Tim Bresnan; Stuart Broad; Paul Collingwood; Joe Denly; Andrew Flintoff; Eoin Morgan; Matt Prior (wk); Adil Rashid; Owais Shah; Ryan Sidebottom; Graeme Swann; Luke Wright	Ricky Ponting (c); Nathan Bracken; Michael Clarke; Callum Ferguson; Brad Haddin (wk); Nathan Hauritz; Ben Hilfenhaus; James Hopes; Michael Hussey; Mitchell Johnson; Brett Lee; Tim Paine (wk); Peter Siddle; Shane Watson; Cameron White	Paul Collingwood (c); James Anderson; Ravi Bopara; Tim Bresnan; Stuart Broad; Joe Denly; Andrew Flintoff; Eoin Morgan; Matt Prior (wk); Adil Rashid; Owais Shah; Ryan Sidebottom; Graeme Swann; Jonathan Trott; Luke Wright	Michael Clarke (c); Callum Ferguson; Brad Haddin (wk); Nathan Hauritz; Ben Hilfenhaus; David Hussey; Mitchell Johnson; Brett Lee; Dirk Nannes; Adam Voges; David Warner; Shane Watson; Cameron White

== Matches ==
=== First class matches ===
==== Tour matches ====
===== Australians v Sussex =====
24 – 27 June
Scorecard

Australians	v	Sussex
349/7d (90 overs); BJ Haddin 69 (119); PSE Sandri 3/73 [13]		311 (80.2 overs); CD Nash 45 (102); SR Clark 3/46 [15]
379/7d (95.1 overs); PJ Hughes 78 (127); OP Rayner 2/68 [30]		373/7 (89 overs); CD Hopkinson 115 (138); BW Hilfenhaus 2/70 [11]

Match drawn
County Cricket Ground, Hove
Umpires: SJ Malone (Eng) and G Sharp (Eng)

The match was notable for the success of Pepler Sandri, a South African-born fast bowler of Italian ancestry, who took three key wickets on the first day.

Needing 418 in their final innings to win, the Sussex batsmen came within 37 runs of this total before time was called with three wickets remaining. Carl Hopkinson was the highest scorer, achieving 115 runs from 172 deliveries.

===== Australians v England Lions =====
1 – 4 July
Scorecard

Australians	v	England Lions
358 (96.4 overs); MEK Hussey 150 (234); SJ Harmison 4/80 [25]		352 (96 overs); SC Moore 120 (176); B Lee 6/76 [27]
438/4d (103 overs); MJ North 191 (281); SJ Harmison 2/55 [17]		162/4 (47.2 overs); JL Denly 36 (42); MG Johnson 2/48 [9]

Match drawn
New Road, Worcester
Umpires: JH Evans (Eng) and JW Lloyds (Eng)
Player of the match: B Lee (Aus)

Brett Lee sustained a rib injury during the preparatory match against the England Lions which prevented him from playing any part in the Test series.

===== Australians v Northamptonshire =====
24 – 26 July
Scorecard

Australians	v	Northamptonshire
308/8d (79 overs); SR Watson 84 (96); DS Lucas 2/44 [15]		226/7d (49.3 overs); AG Wakely 62 (76); PM Siddle 3/53 [9.3]
270/3d (53 overs); AB McDonald 75 (85); GG White 1/49 [11]		217 (64.1 overs); NJ O'Brien 58 (56); AB McDonald 4/15 [11]

Australia won by 135 runs
County Cricket Ground, Northampton
Umpires: MJD Bodenham and MA Eggleston (Eng)

===== Australians v England Lions =====
15 – 16 August
Scorecard

Australians	v	England Lions
340/9d (81 overs); SR Watson 95 (85); G Keedy 3/70 [19]		237 (80.4 overs); JWM Dalrymple 58 (122); B Lee 3/37 [16]

Australia won by 103 runs
St Lawrence Ground, Canterbury
Umpires: SC Gale and SA Garratt

- The Australians were originally to play Kent on the same ground, but could not following Kent's qualification for Finals Day (15 August) of the 2009 Twenty20 Cup.

==== The Ashes ====
The 2009 Ashes series was held from 8 July to 23 August 2009 at five grounds in England and Wales. The first Test, held at Sophia Gardens in Cardiff – itself hosting its first ever Test match – finished in a draw, while the second Test at London's Lord's Cricket Ground resulted in a 115-run victory for England after they had bowled Australia out for 215 in their first innings. Andrew Flintoff, who had announced his impending retirement from Test cricket prior to the Lord's Test, took five wickets in the second innings to secure the victory.

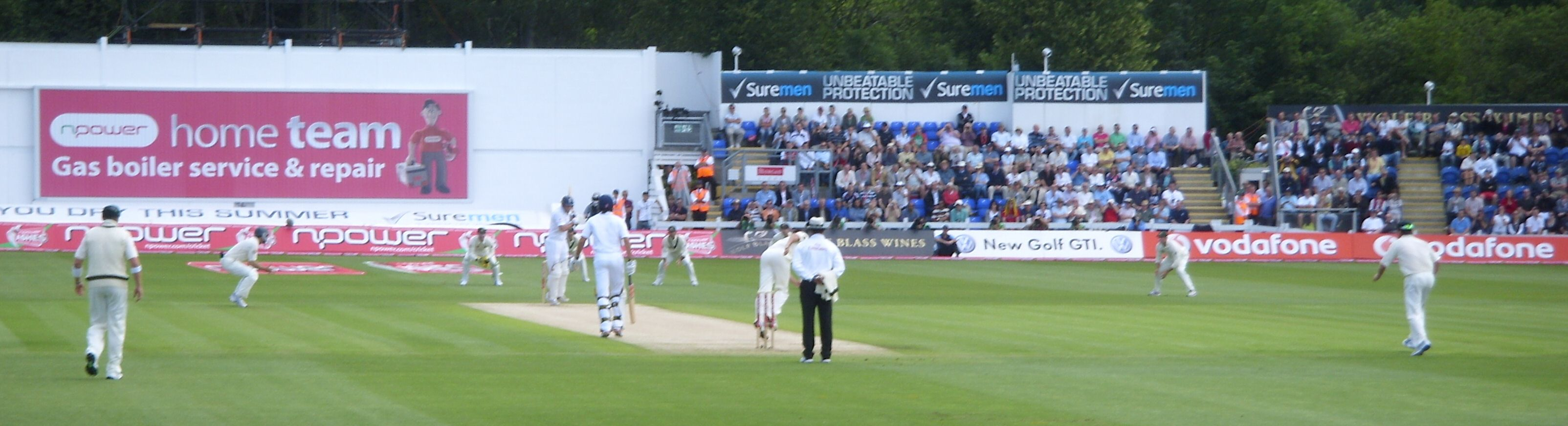
The opening ball of the 2009 Ashes series: Mitchell Johnson to Andrew Strauss

The rain-affected third Test at Edgbaston in Birmingham also finished in a draw, but a batting collapse brought about by immaculate bowling in the fourth Test at Headingley in Leeds meant that England were dismissed for 102 and ended up losing by an innings and 80 runs. That result took the series to a final, deciding Test at The Oval back in London.

England reached 332 all out in their first innings, and then skittled the Australians for 160 on the second day, with Stuart Broad taking five wickets. A total of 373/9 declared, including a maiden Test century from Jonathan Trott, meant that Australia were set a target of 546 runs with two days left to play. All ten wickets came on the fourth day of the match, and despite a knock of 121 for Michael Hussey, Australia's response of 348 meant that they fell 197 runs short and England won the series 2–1.

=== Limited overs matches ===
After the Test series, Australia played one One Day International against Scotland before embarking on a two-match Twenty20 International series and a seven-match One Day International series against England. They won the match against Scotland by 189 runs, but the Twenty20 series against England was drawn 0–0 as both matches were affected by rain and produced no results. The ODI series is scheduled to begin on 4 September 2009.

==== Scotland v Australia ====
28 August 2009
Scorecard

Australia; 345 (50 overs)	v	Scotland; 156 (39.3 overs)
DJ Hussey 111 (83); G Goudie 5/73 [10]		GM Hamilton 38 (50); SR Watson 3/29 [6]

Australia won by 189 runs
The Grange, Edinburgh
Umpires: AL Hill (NZ) and IN Ramage (Sco)
Player of the match: DJ Hussey (Aus)

Australia began their series of One Day International and Twenty20 International matches with a warm-up match against Scotland. Scotland won the toss, but chose to field, a decision that Australia made them regret with a total of 345 all out off their 50 overs. Opener Shane Watson and middle-order batsman Adam Voges both made half-centuries, but the total was bolstered by David Hussey's 111 runs off 83 balls, an innings that included five sixes. Scotland's Gordon Goudie took five wickets, only the second Scottish player to manage such a feat in One Day Internationals. Scotland responded by posting 51 runs for their first wicket within 10 overs, but they lost another three wickets before reaching their ton. They were eventually bowled out for 156 in 39.3 overs, with Gavin Hamilton top-scoring with 38 off 50 balls, meaning that Australia won by 189 runs.

==== Twenty20 series ====
30 August
Scorecard

Australia; 145/4 (20 overs)	v	England; 4/2 (1.1 overs)
CL White 55 (36); PD Collingwood 2/20 [4]		RS Bopara 1 (3); MG Johnson 1/1 [0.1]

No result
Old Trafford Cricket Ground, Manchester
Umpires: IJ Gould and RA Kettleborough

- Rain delayed England innings by 45 minutes to 16:55, then forced abandonment of match in second over.

The Twenty20 International series began on 30 August 2009 at Old Trafford, Manchester. England won the toss and captain Paul Collingwood chose to field first. The Australian first wicket lasted until the sixth over, when Shane Watson was caught by Ravi Bopara off Stuart Broad. David Warner was then trapped LBW by Paul Collingwood for 33 runs in the ninth over, and David Hussey lasted just two balls before being stumped by Matt Prior for a duck, again off Collingwood's bowling. However, Australia added 78 runs for their fourth wicket, Cameron White totalling 55 runs – including three sixes – before being caught by Collingwood off Broad. This left them at 132/4, with 11 balls left, in which Adam Voges scored 11 to take the tourists to 145/4 at the end of their 20 overs. As the England openers came to the crease, Bopara got off strike with the second ball, leaving T20I debutant Joe Denly to face Brett Lee. The Australian bowler pitched the ball short, and Denly managed to get his bat to it, only to top-edge to Nathan Hauritz at short square leg for a debut golden duck. Bopara himself was out with his next ball, the first of the second over, but rain called a halt to proceedings at that point, and England were saved from a looming defeat.

1 September
day/night
Scorecard

England	v	Australia

Match abandoned without a ball bowled
Old Trafford Cricket Ground, Manchester
Umpires: PJ Hartley and NJ Llong

Heavy rain prevented the start of the second T20I, with the umpires inspecting the pitch twice before deciding to abandon the match. Although the majority of the field was suitable for play, a small patch of turf at the Brian Statham End where the bowlers would have made their run-ups remained soft under foot, and the umpires and the captains made the determination that it would have been unsafe for play to commence.

==== NatWest series ====
4 September
day/night
Scorecard

Australia; 260/5 (50 overs)	v	England; 256/8 (50 overs)
CJ Ferguson 71* (75); PD Collingwood 2/47 [9]		RS Bopara 49 (88); MG Johnson 3/24 [7]

Australia won by 4 runs
The Oval, London
Umpires: AL Hill (NZ) and NJ Llong (Eng)
Player of the match: CJ Ferguson (Aus)

The England's captain, Andrew Strauss, won the toss and elected to field first. In the first innings Australia scored 260 for 5, Cameron White and Callum Ferguson scored half centuries, the highest score for both. In the second innings Strauss fell soon with only 12 runs, but Ravi Bopara scored 49 runs. In the 9th wicket Ryan Sidebottom and Adil Rashid scored 27 runs in 14 balls, but they need 32 for the victory.

6 September
Scorecard

Australia; 249/8 (50 overs)	v	England; 210 (46.1 overs)
CJ Ferguson 55 (58); GP Swann 2/31 [8]		PD Collingwood 56 (84); B Lee 2/22 [8.1]

Australia won by 39 runs
Lord's Cricket Ground, London
Umpires: IJ Gould (Eng) and AL Hill (NZ)
Player of the match: MG Johnson (Aus)

England won the toss, and Andrew Strauss chose to field. Callum Ferguson again scored a half century. Australia closed the innings with 249 for 8. In the second innings England opened with 74 runs in the first wicket (Ravi Bopara 27 and Andrew Strauss 44), but the next 9 wickets only scored 136 runs, and finally England lose the game but 39 runs. Paul Collingwood reached 4,000 runs in ODI (5th Englishman), and scored his 22nd Half century.

9 September
day/night
Scorecard

England; 228/9 (50 overs)	v	Australia; 230/4 (48.3 overs)
AJ Strauss 63 (72); SR Watson 3/36 [8]		CL White 105 (124); LJ Wright 1/16 [7]

Australia won by 6 wickets
Rose Bowl, Southampton
Umpires: PJ Hartley (Eng) and AL Hill (NZ)
Player of the match: CL White (Aus)

Andrew Strauss won the toss for third time in the series, and elected to bat. Strauss scored 63 runs, his 17th half century, England scored 229 for 9. Cameron White scored his first century, and Michael Clarke his 36th half century. Both scored 143 runs in the 3rd wicket (Clarke 52 runs and White 86 runs), Clarke was bowled by Graeme Swann. Finally Australia reached the target with 6 wickets and 9 balls remaining.

12 September
Scorecard

England; 220 (46.3 overs)	v	Australia; 221/3 (43.4 overs)
AJ Strauss 63 (75); B Lee 5/49 [9]		MJ Clarke 62* (81); TT Bresnan 2/41 [8]

Australia won by 7 wickets
Lord's Cricket Ground, London
Umpires: Asad Rauf (Pak) and NJ Llong (Eng)
Player of the match: B Lee (Aus)

Ricky Ponting returned as Australian captain. Strauss won for fourth time the toss, and chose bat. Andrew Strauss opened with 63 runs, his 18th half century. Brett Lee took 5 wickets by 9th time in his career. England scored 220 in 46.3 overs. In the second innings Tim Paine scored his first half century, and Michael Clarke his 37th. Australia reached the target with only 3 wickets, and won the series.

15 September
day/night
Scorecard

England; 299 (50 overs)	v	Australia; 302/6 (48.2 overs)
EJG Morgan 58 (41); NM Hauritz 2/54 [10]		RT Ponting 126 (109); SCJ Broad 2/57 [9]

Australia won by 4 wickets
Trent Bridge, Nottingham
Umpires: Asad Rauf (Pak) and RA Kettleborough (Eng)
Player of the match: RT Ponting (Aus)

England won the toss, and Strauss elected bat. England open with Strauss (35) and Denly (45), but Eoin Morgan scored 58 runs, making his 6th half century. England finally scored 299. In the Second innings the openers Watson (36) and Paine (16) fell soon in the match (9th and 15th over), but Ricky Ponting scored his highest score vs England 126 runs off 109 balls (27th century), and Michael Clarke scored 52 runs (38th half century). Mitchell Johnson scored a six for the victory with 10 balls remaining.

17 September
day/night
Scorecard

Australia; 296/8 (50 overs)	v	England; 185 (41 overs)
TD Paine 111 (148); JM Anderson 4/55 [10]		TT Bresnan 31* (38); JR Hopes 3/32 [9]

Australia won by 111 runs
Trent Bridge, Nottingham
Umpires: Asad Rauf (Pak) and NJ Llong (Eng)
Player of the match: TD Paine (Aus)

20 September
Scorecard

Australia; 176 (45.5 overs)	v	England; 177/6 (40 overs)
RT Ponting 53 (67); GP Swann 5/28 [10]		JL Denly 53 (78); SR Watson 1/12 [5]

England won by 4 wickets
Riverside Ground, Chester-le-Street
Umpires: Asad Rauf (Pak) and NJ Llong (Eng)
Player of the match: GP Swann (Eng)

== Media coverage ==
Television

- Sky Sports (live) (HD) – United Kingdom and Ireland
- Fox Sports (live) (HD) – Australia
- SBS (live) (HD) – Australia
- Star Sports (live) – China
- Eurosport (pay per view) – Europe
- Star Cricket (live) – India
- SKY Sport (live) (HD) – New Zealand
- Geo Super (live) – Pakistan
- Supersport (live) – South Africa
- Zee Sports (live) – USA
- Five (highlights) – United Kingdom

Radio

- ABC Local Radio (live) – Australia
- BBC Radio 5 Live Sports Extra and BBC Radio 4 LW (live) – United Kingdom
