= Ulverstone =

Ulverstone or Ulverston may refer to:

== Places ==
- Ulverston, a town in Cumbria, England, formerly known as Ulverstone
- Ulverstone, Tasmania, a town on the north coast of Tasmania, Australia

== Schools ==
- Ulverston Victoria High School, a school in Cumbria, successor to Ulverston Grammar School and Victoria Secondary Modern
- Ulverstone Secondary College, a school in Tasmania

== Sports Clubs ==
- Ulverstone Cricket Club, Tasmania
- Ulverstone Football Club, an Australian rules football club in Tasmania
- Ulverstone Soccer Club, an association football club in Tasmania

== See also ==
- Ulverston Canal, a canal linking Ulverston with Morecambe Bay
- Ulverston railway station, serving Ulverston, Cumbria
- Ulverstone and Lancaster Railway, an extinct railway in Cumbria and Lancashire, England
- Ulverton (disambiguation)
- West Ulverstone, Tasmania, a locality
