= Emmanuel Benjamin =

Indian-Australian cricketer

Personal information
- Full name: Emmanuel Benjamin
- Born: 2 February 1955 (age 71); Jullundur, Punjab, India
- Batting: Left-handed
- Bowling: Slow left-arm
- Role: All-rounder

Domestic team information
- Years: Team
- 1973–1978: Punjab (India)
- 1980: Bedfordshire (minor counties)
- 1982: Tasmania

Career statistics
Competition	FC
Matches	22
Runs scored	463
Batting average	13.61
100s/50s	0/0
Top score	46
Balls bowled	2,385
Wickets	37
Bowling average	29.94
5 wickets in innings	2
10 wickets in match	0
Best bowling	6/51
Catches/stumpings	19/-
- Source: CricketArchive, 2 April 2014

Emmanuel Benjamin (born 2 February 1955), nicknamed Benji, is an Indian-born Australian former professional cricketer who played at high levels in Australia, England, and India. He was the second Indian cricketer to play in the Sheffield Shield after Rusi Surti in 1982.

== Life and career ==
Born in Jullundur, Benjamin toured the British Isles with an India Schools representative side during the 1973 English season, playing six matches alongside future Test player Bharath Reddy and several other future first-class cricketers. After playing for a North Zone schools side in the under-age Cooch Behar Trophy, Benjamin made his first-class debut in October 1973, taking two wickets for a Vazir Sultan Tobacco Colts XI against a Hyderabad Cricket Association XI in the quarter-final of the Moin-ud-Dowlah Gold Cup Tournament. A bowling all-rounder, he debuted for Punjab later that month, taking 5/37 on debut against Jammu and Kashmir, and was a regular in Ranji Trophy teams through to the 1977–78 season. His best innings figures also came against Jammu and Kashmir – 6/51 in November 1975 to help bowl out the side for 167 in the first innings.

Benjamin spent the 1980 English season playing for Bedfordshire in the Minor Counties Championship, a spell which included half-centuries against Buckinghamshire and Shropshire. His best figures in the competition, 6/85, came against Suffolk in both teams' last match of the season, which was not enough to prevent a one-wicket loss after Suffolk's final three batsmen put on 89 runs (including 53 not out from Colin Rutterford).

During the 1981–82 Sheffield Shield season, Benjamin played a single match for Tasmania, bowling 23 overs without taking a wicket. Remaining in Australia, he had a long career for the Ulverstone Cricket Club at grade cricket level, and became a naturalised citizen of Australia in 1991.

A resident of Leith (near Ulverstone), Benjamin unsuccessfully contested the Division of Braddon for the Tasmanian branch of the National Party at the 2014 state election. He received 0.79% of first preference votes, while the party's candidates collectively received 2.16% on first preferences.

== See also ==
- List of Tasmanian representative cricketers
