= Pepler Sandri =

South African cricketer (born 1983)

Personal information
- Full name: Pepler Sacto Emiliano Sandri
- Born: 14 January 1983 (age 43); Cape Town, South Africa
- Batting: Right-handed
- Bowling: Right-arm fast-medium
- Role: Bowler

Career statistics
Competition	FC	List A
Matches	28	17
Runs scored	221	24
Batting average	10.04	12.00
100s/50s	0/0	0/0
Top score	26*	14*
Balls bowled	3750	690
Wickets	72	16
Bowling average	28.41	34.06
5 wickets in innings	1	0
10 wickets in match	0	0
Best bowling	5/32	2/18
Catches/stumpings	4/–	5/–
- Source: Cricinfo, 17 July 2009

Pepler Sacto Emiliano Sandri ("Pepler") is a South African cricketer who has played cricket for Boland, Cape Cobras and Sussex.

He signed for Sussex on a one-year contract at the start of the 2009 season. In June 2009 he took three top-order wickets for Sussex against the touring Australian team at Hove.
