= Steve Harmison =

English cricketer (born 1978)

Steve Harmison MBE DL
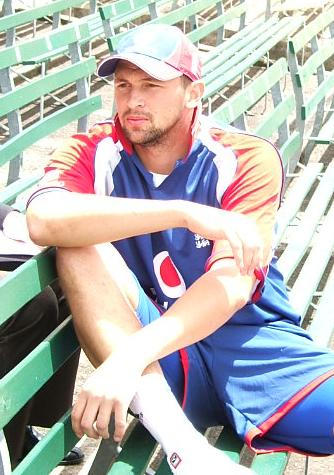

Personal information
- Full name: Stephen James Harmison
- Born: 23 October 1978 (age 48); Ashington, Northumberland, England
- Nickname: Harmy
- Height: 6 ft 4 in (1.93 m)
- Batting: Right-handed
- Bowling: Right-arm fast
- Role: Bowler
- Relatives: Ben Harmison (brother)

International information
- National side: England (2002–2009)
- Test debut (cap 611): 8 August 2002 v India
- Last Test: 20 August 2009 v Australia
- ODI debut (cap 173): 17 December 2002 v Sri Lanka
- Last ODI: 3 April 2009 v West Indies
- ODI shirt no.: 10 (previously 28)
- T20I debut (cap 4): 13 June 2005 v Australia
- Last T20I: 15 June 2006 v Sri Lanka

Domestic team information
- Years: Team
- 1996–2013: Durham (squad no. 10)
- 2007: Marylebone Cricket Club (MCC)
- 2007: Highveld Lions
- 2012: → Yorkshire (on loan)

Career statistics
Competition	Test	ODI	FC	LA
Matches	63	58	211	143
Runs scored	743	91	1,888	267
Batting average	11.79	8.27	9.78	8.09
100s/50s	0/0	0/0	0/0	0/0
Top score	49*	18*	49*	25*
Balls bowled	13,375	2,899	39,374	6,838
Wickets	226	76	744	184
Bowling average	31.82	32.64	27.96	30.75
5 wickets in innings	8	1	27	1
10 wickets in match	1	0	1	0
Best bowling	7/12	5/33	7/12	5/33
Catches/stumpings	7/–	10/–	31/–	23/–
- Source: CricketArchive, 30 September 2017
Association football career
- Position: Centre-back
Senior career*
Years	Team	Apps	(Gls)
- Ashington
- Ashington Hirst Progressive
Managerial career
- 2015–2017: Ashington
- * Club domestic league appearances and goals

Stephen James Harmison (born 23 October 1978) is an English former first-class cricketer, who played all formats of the game. A fast bowler, he represented England in 63 Tests, 58 ODIs and 2 T20s. He also played county cricket for Durham and Yorkshire.

He made his Test and ODI debut for England in 2002 and achieved modest success in these early stages of his career, showing promise as a capable strike bowler for England. This was borne out during the tour of the West Indies in 2003–04, where he produced some of his finest bowling and went on to become the highest wicket-taker in the series. He followed it up by playing a vital role in England's victory in the 2005 Ashes series and was selected as one of the Wisden Cricketers of the Year in 2005. At the time, he was regarded as one of the world's best fast bowlers. Harmison's performance following the 2005 Ashes victory was inconsistent and he announced his retirement from ODIs in 2006. His problems were compounded by niggling fitness worries and intense competition for a place in the English team. Although he came out of ODI retirement in 2008, his place in the squad was never permanent, ultimately leading to his being dropped since 2009. His last Test for England was the final test of the 2009 Ashes series, and he played his last ODI against West Indies in the same year. He formally announced his retirement from the game in October 2013.

Harmison's success during his prime was attributed to his ability to extract bounce from any pitch – mainly due to his height being 6'4" – and his ability to swing the ball while maintaining speeds of over 90 mph. However, his lack of consistency often led to lethal spells being mixed up with equally bad bowling (a notable example is the opening ball of the 2006 Ashes, which he bowled straight to second slip, resulting in a wide that media commentators dubbed "the worst ball in history"). Nevertheless, in 2007, former Australian cricketer Shane Warne named Harmison in his list of 50 greatest cricketers: "On his day, he is one of the most awkward bowlers [to face] in the world".

After retiring from cricket, Harmison managed his hometown football club, Ashington, between 2015 and 2017.

== Personal life ==
Harmison was born and brought up in Ashington, Northumberland, and is the eldest of three brothers and one sister. The youngest brother, Ben, latterly played first-class cricket for Kent and also played for his home county Durham.

Harmison currently lives in Ashington with his wife Hayley and their three daughters Emily, Abbie and Isabel and son, Charlie. A family man by nature, Harmison admitted to homesickness and missing his family each time the England team went on tour; in an interview with The Independent in 2005, he stated:

"I have a family. I have kids that need me around and they will dictate the decisions I make on my career....My international career will finish when my family needs me to be around a bit more."

He still remains a fan of football and is a lifelong supporter of Newcastle United F.C.

Harmison has suffered from clinical depression from an early age, but hid it as homesickness during his England career.

== Early life ==
As a teenager, Harmison played for his local football club, Ashington A.F.C. and Ashington Hirst Progressive, before deciding to concentrate on cricket.

== County career ==
Harmison made his first-class debut for Durham in 1996. He played an important role in Durham's first County Championship triumph in 2008, taking 60 wickets in that season at an average of 22.66. Harmison observed, "The [2005] Ashes takes some beating, because of the nature of that series win, but behind that, I don't think there is a prouder moment in my career.". Durham took their second title assisted by Harmison the following year. He played his last first-class match during a brief loan period with Yorkshire in 2012.

== International career ==
=== Initial selection ===
Steve Harmison was first selected for an England squad in May 2000 during the tour to England by Zimbabwe, but did not play. As part of an ECB National Academy touring team that also contained Andrew Strauss, Ian Bell and Rob Key, Harmison showed clear signs of his ability in the tour of Australia in 2001–02. In August 2002, Harmison made his Test match debut at Trent Bridge against India, replacing the injured Simon Jones.

Originally lacking somewhat in control, he bowled seven consecutive wides in the first match of the tour of Australia, against the ACB Chairman's XI's at Lilac Hill in 2002. However, promising performances later in the tour saw him named in the World Cup squad, although he did not take to the field in any of the matches. He was then awarded with a six-month central contract by the ECB, but this was not renewed in September 2003.

Despite media complaints about his ability, he was named in the England squad for the winter tour to Bangladesh and Sri Lanka, partially due to injuries to other players. Harmison gave a man-of-the-match performance in the opening Test against Bangladesh, taking 9 wickets for 79 on a slow wicket, before succumbing to a back injury and missing the matches against Sri Lanka. Despite the injury, he had done enough to be selected for the winter tour to the West Indies. He took seven wickets at the cost of just 12 runs as the West Indies collapsed to their lowest-ever Test total of 47 all out. Harmison went on to win the Man-of-the-Series award after taking 23 wickets in the four Tests.

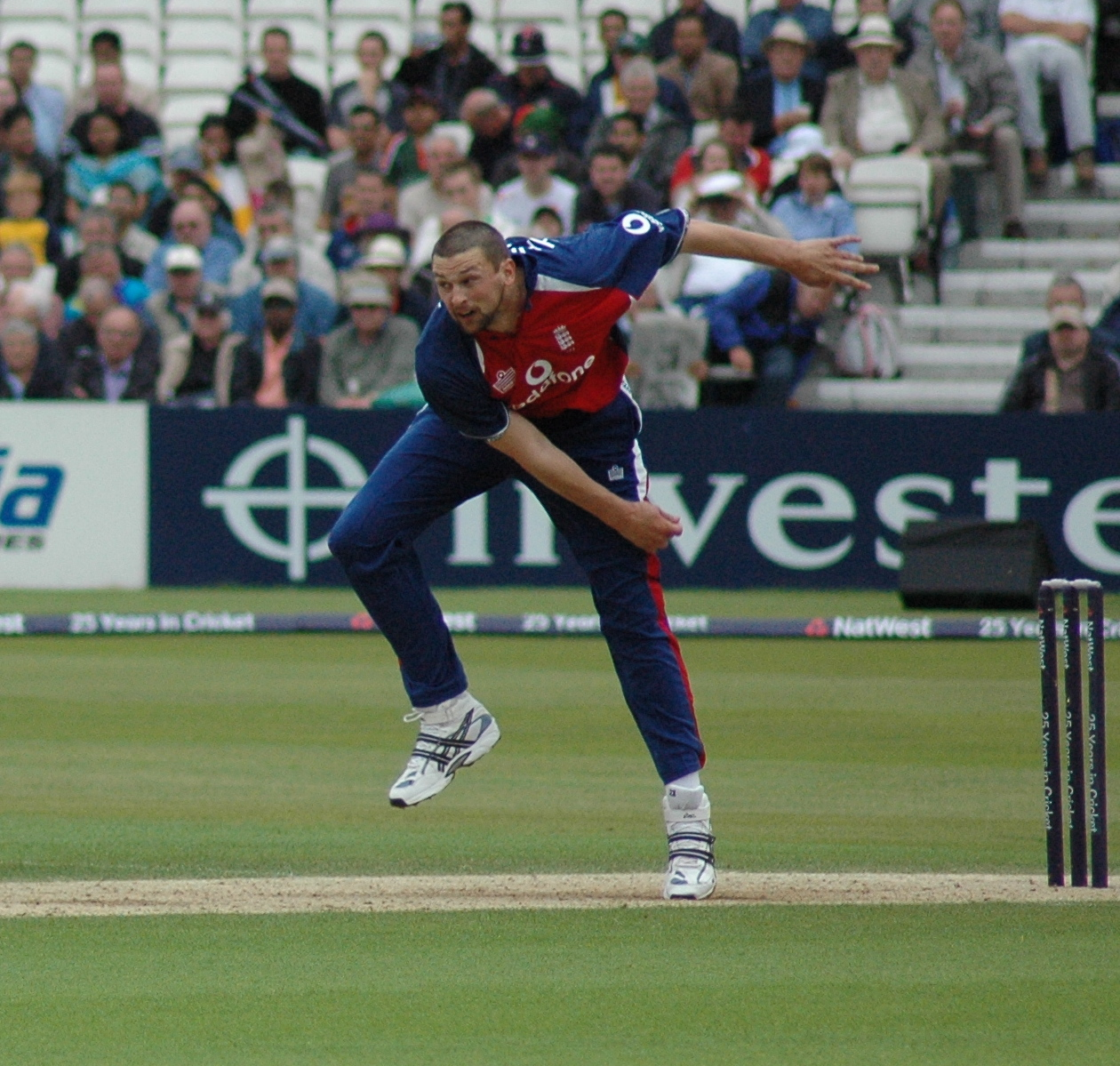
Harmison bowls against Bangladesh in 2005

=== West Indies in 2004 ===
With the West Indies touring England in 2004, it was expected that Harmison, who had also shone in the three-match Test series against New Zealand earlier in 2004, would again be England's lead bowler. West Indies captain Brian Lara went as far as suggesting that England had no plan B after Harmison. However, Harmison was outshone by spin bowler Ashley Giles for the first three Tests, before he took nine wickets in the final match. In that match, he also punished the West Indies bowling with the bat, hitting three sixes and three fours in a brief innings ending at 34 not out. Harmison's bowling performance in this match took him to the top of the Pricewaterhousecoopers cricket ratings. In 2004, Harmison took 67 wickets in just 13 matches, at a superb average of 23.92.

Harmison disappointed with the ball on the 2004–05 England tour of South Africa, taking just 9 wickets in the Test series at the extremely high average of 73.22. During this series, he spoke frankly about his homesickness on foreign tours. However, his solid performances with the bat, including an innings high score of 42 in the 3rd Test, led some commentators to note, not altogether jokingly, that he was now making a case to be considered a tail all-rounder. Despite these disappointments, he was still named as one of five cricketers of the year by Wisden Cricketer's Almanack in 2005. For his performances in 2004, he was named in the World Test XI by ICC.

=== Ashes 2005 ===
In summer 2005 Harmison was part of the England team that regained The Ashes from Australia. He started the series well, with a hostile opening spell on the first day of the 1st Test, taking five wickets, including that of Australia captain Ricky Ponting. An incident in this innings in which Harmison cut Ricky Ponting's face with a short ball caused controversy because of the apparently uncaring response of England players to Ponting's injury, a response about which Harmison subsequently expressed regret.

Although England lost the first test and Harmison was later outshone by Flintoff and Jones, he exerted pressure and claimed important wickets throughout the series as England fought back. His most important and dazzling wicket, some might say, was the slower-ball yorker with which he bowled Michael Clarke, described by Mark Nicholas, commentating for Channel 4, as "one of the great balls". Marcus Trescothick and Andrew Flintoff believed he had the second-worst split-fingered slower ball in the squad, after Flintoff. Harmison also took the final wicket of Michael Kasprowicz the next day, caught behind from a bouncer by Geraint Jones for England to win by the wafer thin margin of only two runs. But a video replay showed that Kasprowicz's hand was not in contact with the bat when brushed by the ball, and he should not have been given out by the umpire. England had been massive favourites overnight, but Australia, needing over a hundred to win with only two wickets left had almost pulled a victory from the very jaws of defeat thanks to the tail end efforts of Shane Warne, Brett Lee and Kasprowicz until Harmison struck.

=== Decline in form ===
In July 2006, during the series against Pakistan, Harmison took 6/19 off just 13 overs in the first innings as Pakistan were skittled for just 119. In the second he again shared the 10 wickets with Monty Panesar, taking 5/57. He thus took his first 10 wicket haul in a match, taking 11/76. This came in his 45th Test match and was the best match bowling figures at Old Trafford since Jim Laker's 19/90, exactly 50 years previously.

During the 2006 ICC Champions Trophy Harmison's form came under scrutiny and he was dropped from England's final match against the West Indies. In November 2006, Harmison bowled the first ball of the eagerly awaited 2006–07 Ashes series at the Gabba in Brisbane, but erred by bowling a ball so wide that it went to Andrew Flintoff at second slip. This incident became so infamous that some commentators began referring to any similarly wide delivery as 'a Harmison'. After another below par performance in Adelaide he would find some form in Perth with 4/48 in the 1st innings.

=== ODI retirement ===
On 21 December 2006, three months before the 2007 Cricket World Cup, Harmison announced his retirement from One Day International cricket after being left out of the squad for the one-day series in Australia. In October 2007, Harmison travelled to South Africa to play domestic cricket before heading to Sri Lanka as part of the England Test squad. After a shaky start, however, he suffered a back injury on the first day of the second warm up match, having taken one wicket. He was not included in the squad for the first test, however he took three wickets in the second. Harmison was then dropped from the Test side after the first game of the subsequent series in New Zealand. On 21 August 2008, it was announced that Harmison would return to playing One Day International cricket against South Africa.

=== Return in Tests ===
On 7 August 2008 Harmison returned to the England Test team for the Fourth Test match versus South Africa. He took two wickets for 49 runs in helping England to dismiss South Africa for 194 on the first day of the match. Harmison's first ball (the first ball of the match) nearly took a wicket (see picture). In England's first innings Harmison hit a career high Test match score of 49 not out (59 balls,8 fours). He ran teammate Monty Panesar out trying to reach 50. After the Test series on 21 August, Harmison came out of ODI retirement after being persuaded by the new England captain, Kevin Pietersen. On his ODI return versus South Africa on 22 August, he took two wickets for 43 runs, this was crucial in England winning the match.

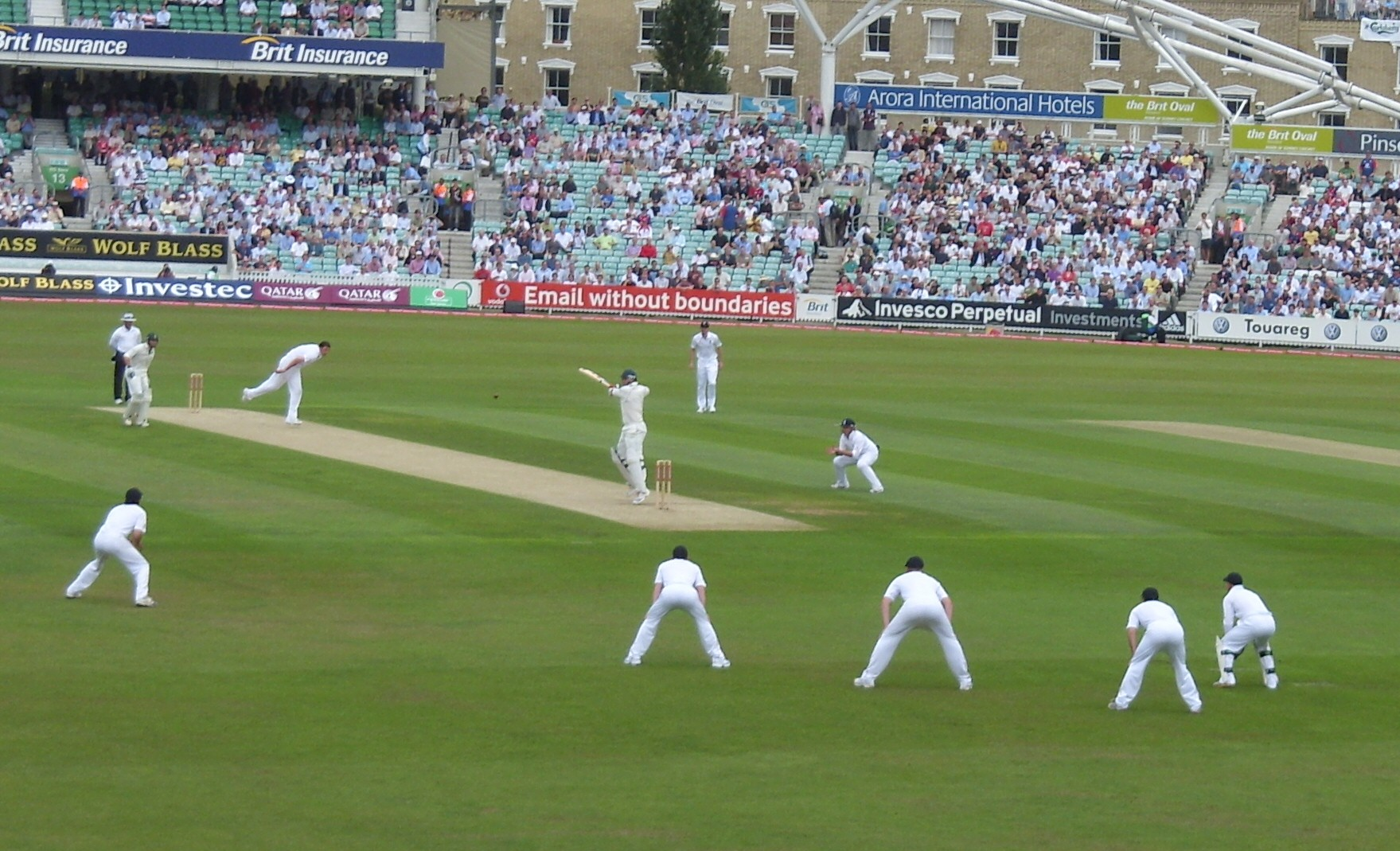
Harmison bowls the first ball of the match in the Test match at The Oval in August 2008. Alastair Cook dropped the catch from the batsman (Graeme Smith) in the gully

Harmison lost his place in the Test team again the following winter during a series in the West Indies. However, on 7 August 2009, exactly one year after his previous return, Harmison was selected to play in the 4th Ashes Test at Headingley, replacing the injured Andrew Flintoff. In this Test, he equalled Mike Atherton & then Monty Panesar's record for the most Test ducks scored by an Englishman (20), caught behind off Peter Siddle as England collapsed to 102 all out against Australia's seam bowling attack. Whereas Atherton had played 115 tests, Harmison achieved the feat in his 62nd test. He also took the wicket of Simon Katich caught in the gully for a duck in the second over of Australia's innings.

He had bowled well to a supportive audience and took the wicket of Australian keeper Brad Haddin. In his second innings Harmison made 19 not out off 28 balls but could not prevent the Australians from totalling 445 and proceeding to an innings victory. Harmison went on to play in the 5th Test at the Oval; on the final day of the series, Harmison claimed the three penultimate wickets to fall, including those of Peter Siddle and Stuart Clark with consecutive deliveries, both caught after attempting to play to the leg side, to create a unique opportunity to win the Ashes with a hat-trick (Ben Hilfenhaus successfully blocked the hat-trick ball). England won by 197 runs to take the series 2–1.

=== Late career and retirement ===
Harmison announced his retirement from all forms of the game on 6 October 2013.

== After cricket and life in football ==
Following his retirement from cricket, Harmison has featured on Sky Sports' cricket programming as a pundit and commentator. However, on 8 February 2015, Harmison was appointed manager of Ashington in the ninth-tier of English football. He resigned from the role in October 2017. In July 2022, Harmison was named as a Talksport correspondent, covering Newcastle United matches and media.

== Recognition ==
Harmison was appointed a Member of the Order of the British Empire (MBE) in the 2006 New Year Honours for services to cricket. He was appointed a Deputy Lieutenant of Northumberland (DL) in 2014.
