= Ulverton =

Ulverton may refer to:

- Ulverton (novel), 1992 novel by British writer Adam Thorpe
- Ulverton, Quebec, a municipality of Quebec, Canada
- Ulverton River, a tributary of the Saint-François River, Quebec, Canada

== See also ==
- Ulverston (disambiguation)
