= Matt Prior =

English cricketer (born 1982)

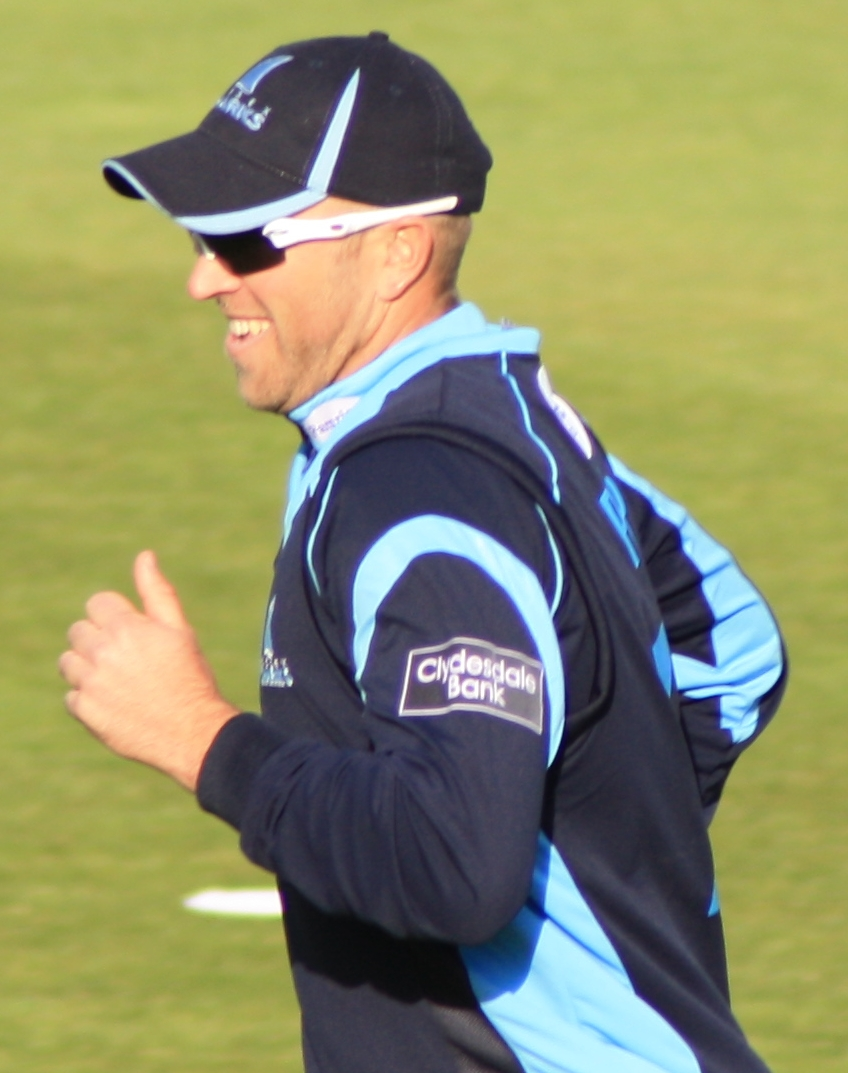

Personal information
- Full name: Matthew James Prior
- Born: 26 February 1982 (age 44); Johannesburg, Transvaal Province, South Africa
- Nickname: Big Cheese
- Height: 5 ft 11 in (1.80 m)
- Batting: Right-handed
- Role: Wicketkeeper-batsman

International information
- National side: England (2004–2014)
- Test debut (cap 635): 17 May 2007 v West Indies
- Last Test: 17 July 2014 v India
- ODI debut (cap 187): 5 December 2004 v Zimbabwe
- Last ODI: 26 March 2011 v Sri Lanka
- ODI shirt no.: 23 (prev. 13)

Domestic team information
- Years: Team
- 2001–2014: Sussex (squad no. 13)
- 2010/11: Victoria
- 2012/13: Sydney Thunder

Career statistics
Competition	Test	ODI	FC	LA
Matches	79	68	242	222
Runs scored	4,099	1,282	12,832	5,072
Batting average	40.18	24.19	39.24	27.26
100s/50s	7/27	0/3	27/74	4/28
Top score	131*	87	201*	144
Catches/stumpings	243/13	71/8	611/41	187/31
- Source: CricketArchive, 19 February 2014

Matthew James Prior (born 26 February 1982) is a South African-born English former cricketer, who played for England in Test cricket and for Sussex County Cricket Club in domestic cricket. He was a wicket-keeper and his aggressive right-handed batting enabled him to open the innings in ODI matches, even though he made very limited appearances in shorter forms of the game. With an international Test debut score of 126, Prior became the first English wicket-keeper to hit a century in his debut match in early 2007. His glovework, however, was criticised. Despite a successful tour of Sri Lanka with the bat, Prior's keeping was less successful, and he was dropped from the team for the 2008 tour of New Zealand. He returned for the 2008 series against South Africa, and was retained into 2009, where he became the second-fastest England keeper to reach 1,000 Test runs, behind Les Ames. He retired in June 2015 from all forms of professional cricket due to a recurring Achilles tendon injury.

Prior was born in Johannesburg, South Africa, and moved to England with his family at the age of 11. His mother is South African and his father is English. Prior attended Brighton College during which time he began playing for Sussex County Cricket Club. During his early years he played his colts cricket at St Matthias CC. He is married to Emily, the daughter of former footballer Sammy Nelson, who played for Arsenal F.C. and Brighton & Hove Albion, and has two children.

Prior was the co-owner and chief executive of One Pro Cycling, which raced at the UCI Continental level in 2015, and were promoted to the second-tier Professional Continental level for 2016. The team was disbanded in 2018.

== Domestic career ==
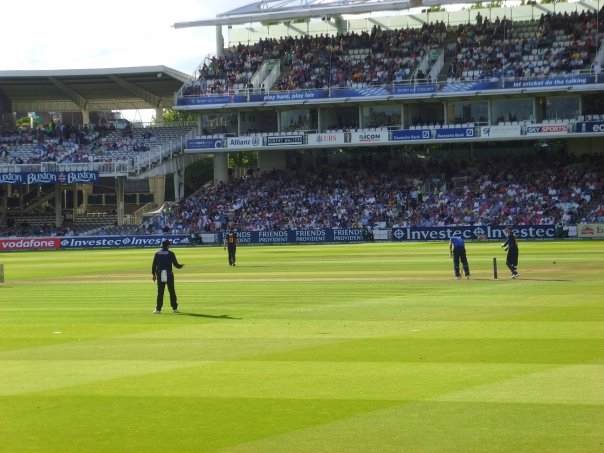
Matthew Prior keeping wicket for Sussex during the final of the 2009 Friends Provident Trophy against Hampshire at Lord's.

Prior received the NBC Denis Compton Award for young cricketers three times in his career. Matt has hit more than 1,000 first-class runs over the course of two seasons, in 2003 when Matt won the County Championship with Sussex, and 2004, when his 1,158 runs, including 201 not out against Loughborough UCCE, was enough to be top-scorer for Sussex that season. In 2005 Matt made fewer runs, with 874, but also became Sussex's first choice wicket-keeper again after having shared duties with Tim Ambrose in the two previous seasons. Matt has won the County Championship three times (2003, 2006 and 2007) although in 2007 Matt did not take part as much as before due to his England duties.

== England career ==
=== 2004–2006 Zimbabwe, Pakistan and India ===
Prior made his One Day International debut in England's one-day series against Zimbabwe in 2004: he was chosen to open with Ian Bell and made 35 before he was dismissed by Ed Rainsford in a 74-run win.

Prior was next selected in the England team a year later for the ODI series against Pakistan. In the opening match of the series he made 45 while opening the batting as England won the match by 42 runs. In the next match he made 32 but England lost the game by seven wickets to leave the series level at 1–1. Despite his good start to the series, Prior struggled in the next three games. He made 2 in the third ODI before making 6 in the fourth match as England lost the game by 13 runs. England won the final match of the series, although Prior could only manage 9 runs. The series finished 3–2 to Pakistan.

Prior kept his place in the ODI squad for the series against India. Prior batted well in the first game, making 22 as England lost by 39 runs. He made 33 in the next game but England again lost, this time by a smaller margin. He was run out while on 37 in the next game as England suffered yet another defeat. In the fourth game of the series Prior made 14 as England lost again, this time by four wickets. Prior did not play in the fifth game of the series, although returned for the sixth, batting lower down the order. He made 3 as England won by five wickets. In the final game of the series England lost again, this time by seven wickets, with Prior contributing just two towards England's score.

=== 2007 West Indies ===
Matt Prior was chosen ahead of Paul Nixon for the keeper's spot for the first Test of the summer at Lord's in 2007 against the West Indies. He scored a hundred on his debut, taking just 105 deliveries and hitting 16 boundaries after coming in at number 7, and finishing on 126 not out. He became the first England wicket keeper to score a Test hundred on debut and the 17th English batsman to record the feat overall. Although both Paul Gibb and Billy Griffith scored debut centuries, and although both were wicket-keepers, neither was actually keeping wicket in their debut Test. The last wicketkeeper to make a half century on debut was Jack Russell, who scored 94 against Sri Lanka at Lords in 1988. Prior was one of four centurions in the innings along with Alastair Cook, Paul Collingwood and Ian Bell. It was the first time since 1938 that four England players scored hundreds in the same innings of a Test match. Prior continued his impressive form into the next game, making 75 as England secured a victory on an innings and 283 runs. Prior again starred in the next game, making 40, although he was dismissed for a duck in the second innings as England won the game by 60 runs. In the final game of the Test series, Prior contributed 62, helping England to win by seven wickets. Throughout the series Prior made eight catches from behind the stumps.

Prior scored his first ODI fifty against the West Indies, making 52 in the second ODI at Edgbaston. However, England lost the match by 61 runs. England lost the final game of the series by 93 runs, with Prior being dismissed for a single.

=== 2007 India and Sri Lanka ===
After making 19 in the first ODI against India, Prior followed this up by making 33 in the second ODI. He made 34 in the next game as England won by 42 runs. After making four in the fourth match, Prior made 46 in the fifth ODI before being stumped, as England lost the game by 38 runs. Prior struggled in the final two matches of the series, making a score of six in the penultimate game and being dismissed for a duck in the final game of the series.

Prior was selected to play in Sri Lanka in the Test series. However, he showed poor form with a duck but then scored 63 in the second innings. Prior put some critics to rest with this and with his efforts in the second match of the tour at Colombo, when he scored 79, which was the backbone of England's first innings score, and ended the series with the third highest batting average for England, 41.25.

However, Prior's good batting form was overshadowed by his poor wicket-keeping. It was the poor form with the gloves that led to him being dropped for the 2008 tour of New Zealand for Tim Ambrose, the Warwickshire keeper and former Sussex rival. When the squad was announced on 4 January 2008, Chairman of Selectors David Graveney stated – "Prior performed well with the bat in Sri Lanka and it has been a difficult decision to leave him out of this tour, but the selectors feel that he needs to further improve his wicket-keeping in order to realise his full potential in international cricket. But I'm sure Matt will be back, there's no doubt about that." Prior considered ending his career as a wicketkeeper to concentrate on his batting, but decided to continue after speaking with Alec Stewart.

=== 2008 South Africa and India ===
Prior returned to the international scene firstly in the One Day International series against South Africa, after missing home and away series against New Zealand. After showing improved glovework, and the failure of Ambrose to hold down a position in the side, Prior firstly returned to the One Day International side for their 4–0 series victory against South Africa in the summer of 2008. In the first match he scored 42 runs as England won by 20 runs. He made an unbeaten 45 and took six catches in the next match as England secured a ten wicket victory. He continued his good form into the third game of the series to help England win by over 100 runs after hitting 33. He was out for a duck in the fourth game of the series before the fifth match was abandoned due to rain.

Prior kept his place in the ODI side for the tour of India. He made four in the first match of the series as England lost by 158 runs. He made a patience 38 in the next game but England again lost, this time by 54 runs. Prior moved down the order for the final three games of series, but failed to make an impact. He scored five in the third match as England went 3–0 down. In the fourth match he had no time to make a contribution in the back end of the innings and in the final game he again did not bat as England lost the series 5–0. Prior was recalled for the Test series between the two sides and batted well in the first match, making an unbeaten 53 in the first innings and hitting 33 in England's second innings. However, India chased down a big target for the loss of only four wickets, leaving England 1–0 down in the series. He had little impact in the next match, scoring two in England's first innings and was not needed to bat in the second as the match ended in a draw.

=== 2009 West Indies ===
Named in the Test squad for the away series against the West Indies, Prior played in the First, Second and Third tests. However, with his wife due to give birth, Prior returned to England to witness the birth, with Ambrose deputising. Despite Ambrose making a not out 76, Prior returned for the 5th Test after returning to the Caribbean. Following the return, Prior made his highest Test score (131 not out) in the final Test Match in Trinidad, and celebrated his century by mimicking rocking a baby with his bat to celebrate becoming a father. However, once again his glovework was questionable, as in the same match he broke the world record for byes conceded. Nevertheless, he was declared Man of the Match.

He remained in the side for the return tour of England by the West Indies and reached 1,000 Test runs with 42 in the first innings of the First Test – the second-fastest England wicketkeeper to this mark, behind Les Ames. In the second Test Prior made 63 in the first innings to help England win the game by an innings and 83 runs and clinch the series 2–0.

=== 2009 Ashes ===
He retained his place in the Test side for the 2009 Ashes, despite James Foster's apparently superior ability behind the sticks, as displayed to much acclaim during the World Twenty20. Prior had done well with the bat for Sussex in the County Championship, averaging over fifty, but had not kept wicket due to a hand injury sustained against the West Indies.

Batting at number six, Prior continued his good form with the bat into the Ashes series, scoring a 62-ball 56 in the first innings at the SWALEC Stadium in Cardiff as England's middle- and lower-order boosted England to 435 all out, and 14 in the second innings as England held on for an improbable draw. In the Lord's victory Prior was bowled for 8 in the first innings as England subsided from 302 for 3 (Andrew Strauss 161) to 425 all out, but contributed a 42-ball 61 in the second innings as England sought quick runs; his partnership with Paul Collingwood added 86 runs in twelve overs. At Edgbaston he scored 41 in England's only innings in a drawn match, and held three catches in each of Australia's innings. Despite suffering from back spasms before the start of the first day, raising doubts as to his fitness to play, Prior offered a lone hand in the first innings at Headingley, scoring 37 not out as England subsided to 102 all out against Australia's seam attack; Prior aside, only Alastair Cook (30) reached double figures. He added a 29-ball 22 in the second innings, sharing a century partnership with Stuart Broad, but could not avert an innings defeat. At the Oval Prior scored only 18 and 4, but produced a sharp stumping on the final day to dismiss Marcus North as England surged to a 197-run victory in the match and a 2–1 victory in the series, thus regaining the Ashes. Prior's series aggregate of 262 runs was higher than any other England player bar Andrew Strauss; his runs had been scored at a Gilchrist-esque strike-rate of 82 per hundred balls.

=== South Africa ===
Prior was a key member of the squad that toured South Africa. He played in the first three ODIs, although he did not bat until the third match, where he made 16. He took two catches as England won the fourth match convincingly. After the final match was abandoned, England won the series 2–1. Prior struggled in the first Test, making a duck in the first innings and just 4 in the second. England went on to win the second test, with Prior making 60 off 81 balls. His attacking play helped England accelerate the innings and secure a comfortable victory. Prior made 76 in the third test, again scoring quickly as England secured a dramatic draw. South Africa won the final Test to level the series 1–1. Throughout the series Prior was praised for his wicketkeeping and counterattacking batting.

=== Bangladesh and Pakistan ===
In the first test against Bangladesh Prior could only make 7 runs, although England went on to win the match. He hit a quick fire 62 in the second test as England went on to win the series 2–0. Prior had been one of the senior figures in an experimental team. In the return series, Prior was run out in the first game having made 16. In the following match he made a quick fire 93 which helped to accelerate the innings and guide England to a comfortable win. In the controversial test series against Pakistan, Prior struggled to make an impact in the first two games, recording low scores. However, he made an unbeaten 84 in the third test, which proved to be in vain as England ended up losing the match. England won the series and Prior consolidated himself in the team.

=== 2010–11 Ashes ===
Prior was ever-present in the Test side in England's successful 2010–11 Ashes Series in Australia. He started the series with a golden duck, the second victim of Peter Siddle's hat-trick on the first day of the series. He only managed a top-score of 27 not out in the first three Tests, however he finished strongly in the final two.

In the fourth Test at the MCG, he held six catches in Australia's first innings as they were bowled out for just 98. He followed this up with 85 runs as England won by an innings to take a 2–1 series lead and retain the Ashes with a Test to spare. In the fifth and final Test he scored his first century against Australia from 109 balls, the fastest English Ashes century since Ian Botham's 118 at Old Trafford in 1981. He was the third centurion of England's innings, along with Alastair Cook and Ian Bell, as England scored 644.

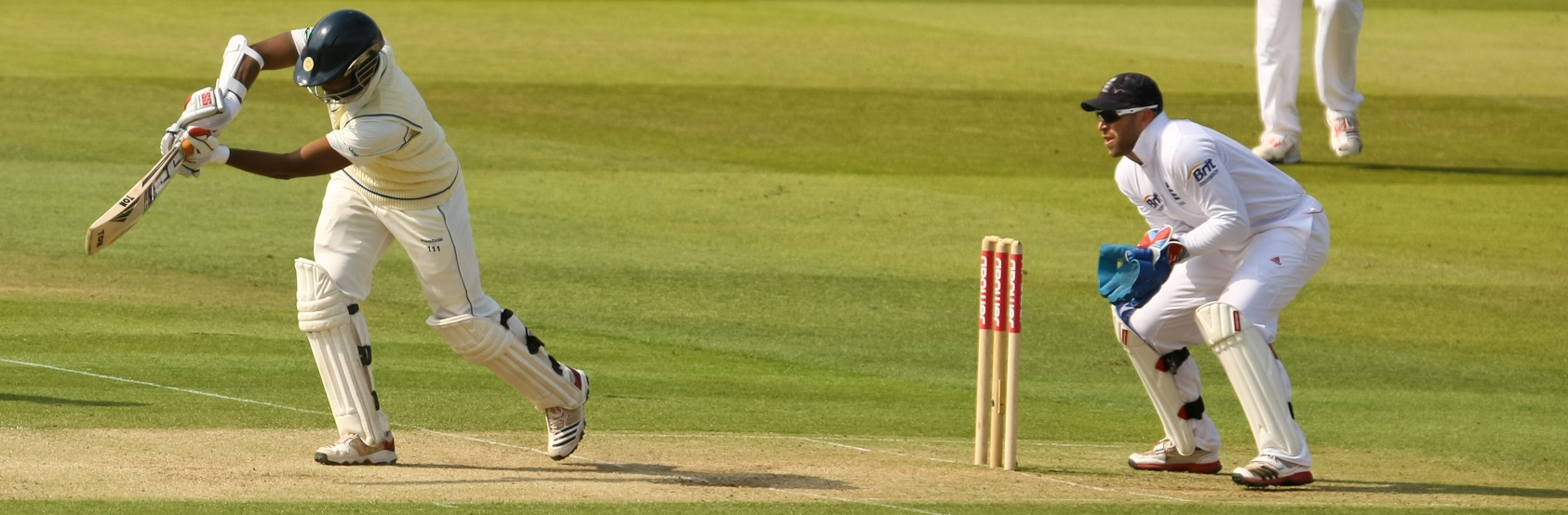
Prior standing up to the stumps during the Lord's Test against Sri Lanka

=== Sri Lanka and India ===
Prior played in the test series against Sri Lanka, as he continued to establish himself as a key player. He made 126 in the second game after not having to bat in the first test. In a rain affected match, Prior only made 4, but he did take five catches as England won the series 1–0. This meant that England had the chance to become the number one ranked test team when they played India. Prior hit 71 and 103 in the first test as he continued to stake a claim for being the best wicket keeper batsman in the world. He made another score of 73 in the second test, as England took a 2–0 lead in the series. England went on to win the series 4–0, and became the number one team in the world.

=== Pakistan and Sri Lanka ===
In the first Test against Pakistan, Prior held the first innings together, making 70 not out to help England reach 192. In the second innings Prior could only make 4 as England again struggled with the bat, being bowled out for 160 and losing the match by 10 wickets. In the second test England again lost, this time by 72 runs. Prior failed to make an impact in either innings as England were bowled out for 72 in their second innings. In the third match of the series, England bowled Pakistan out for 99 runs in their first innings. However, after England collapsed, they lost the match by 71 runs. Prior was stranded on 49 not out in the second innings.

In the first match against Sri Lanka, Prior batted at 6. However, despite making 41 in the second innings, England went on to lose their fourth straight Test match. England won the second match to level the series, with Prior taking four catches and making 11 runs. This meant that they retained their number one spot in the rankings.

=== South Africa ===
England played South Africa in the summer of 2012, with the winner of the series becoming the number one test team. Prior made 60 in the first innings, leaving England in a strong position. However, South Africa made over 600 and although Prior made 40 in the second innings, England were bowled out on the final day to lose by an innings and 12 runs. Prior made 68 in the first innings of the second test. With England chasing 252 to win, Prior batted at 5 to try and force a result. However, he was run out when on 7 and the match eventually ended in a draw. England lost the final match of the series. After South Africa posted 351 in their second innings, England were set 346 to win. Prior gave England hope, making 73 and batting well with Graeme Swann and Stuart Broad. However, it was not enough and England were bowled out by 294, losing the series 2–0 and their number one spot. Matt Prior was promoted to vice-captain of the test side following Andrew Strauss' retirement and Alastair Cook subsequently being made captain.

=== New Zealand ===
Prior was in top form as England toured New Zealand at the back end of 2012. In the first match he made 46 runs in the match as England battled back to a draw. In the second test he hit 82 but the match again finished in a draw as the pitches suited the batsmen and made it difficult for bowlers to make an impact. In the third test Prior made 73 in the first innings, before helping England to secure a draw with a stunning 110 not out. In the return series Prior got off to a nightmare start. He scored ducks in both innings, although England went on to win the game. Prior did better in the second game, scoring 39 and 4 not out as England won the series 2–0.

=== Back to back Ashes ===
Prior was not at his best in the first two Ashes tests, making a high score of 31. Despite this, he continued to impress behind the stumps. in the fifth test, Prior made 47, his best score of the series. Despite an indifferent performance from Prior, England won the series 3–0, with Prior as vice captain. Prior made his 200th catch for England during the 4th test in Durham, and he is third in test dismissals all time behind Alan Knott (250) and Alec Stewart (277).

Prior had an indifferent start to the return series in Australia. In the first Test he scored just four runs. He followed this up with an impressive 69 in the second Test. However, in the third test of the series Prior again struggled for form, failing to pass fifty, meaning he had just one fifty in six innings on the tour. With England 3–0 down in the series in Australia, Prior was dropped in favour of Jonny Bairstow. However England still lost the following tests in Melbourne and Sydney as Australia won the series 5–0.

=== Sri Lanka and India ===
Prior made 86 in the first innings of the first Test against Sri Lanka after almost being given out first ball. He made 16 in the second innings as the match ended in a draw. In the second match of the series Prior made an unbeaten 27 after batting with the tail. In the next innings he was dismissed for 10 after being caught off a short ball. Prior made just five in the first Test against India, although he took six catches behind the stumps. He played in the second test despite fitness concerns, but could only make scores of 13 and 12. England lost the match and Prior later announced that he would be undergoing an operation on his Achilles, ruling him out for the rest of the series.
