= Ulverstone Cricket Club =

Cricket club in Tasmania, Australia

- Founded: 1951
- Based in: Ulverstone, Tasmania
- Home ground: River Park
- Colours: Red and Black
- Head coach: Scott Blair
- Captain: Scott Blair
- 2006/07: 3rd

Ulverstone Cricket Club (UCC) is a cricket team which represents Ulverstone in the North Western Tasmanian Cricket Association grade cricket competition, in the Australian state of Tasmania.

The club was established in 1951. The ground that Ulverstone plays at is near Ulverstone Beach.

== Honours ==
- NWTCA Premierships

== Australian players ==
- Ben Hilfenhaus
