= Marcus North =

Australian cricketer

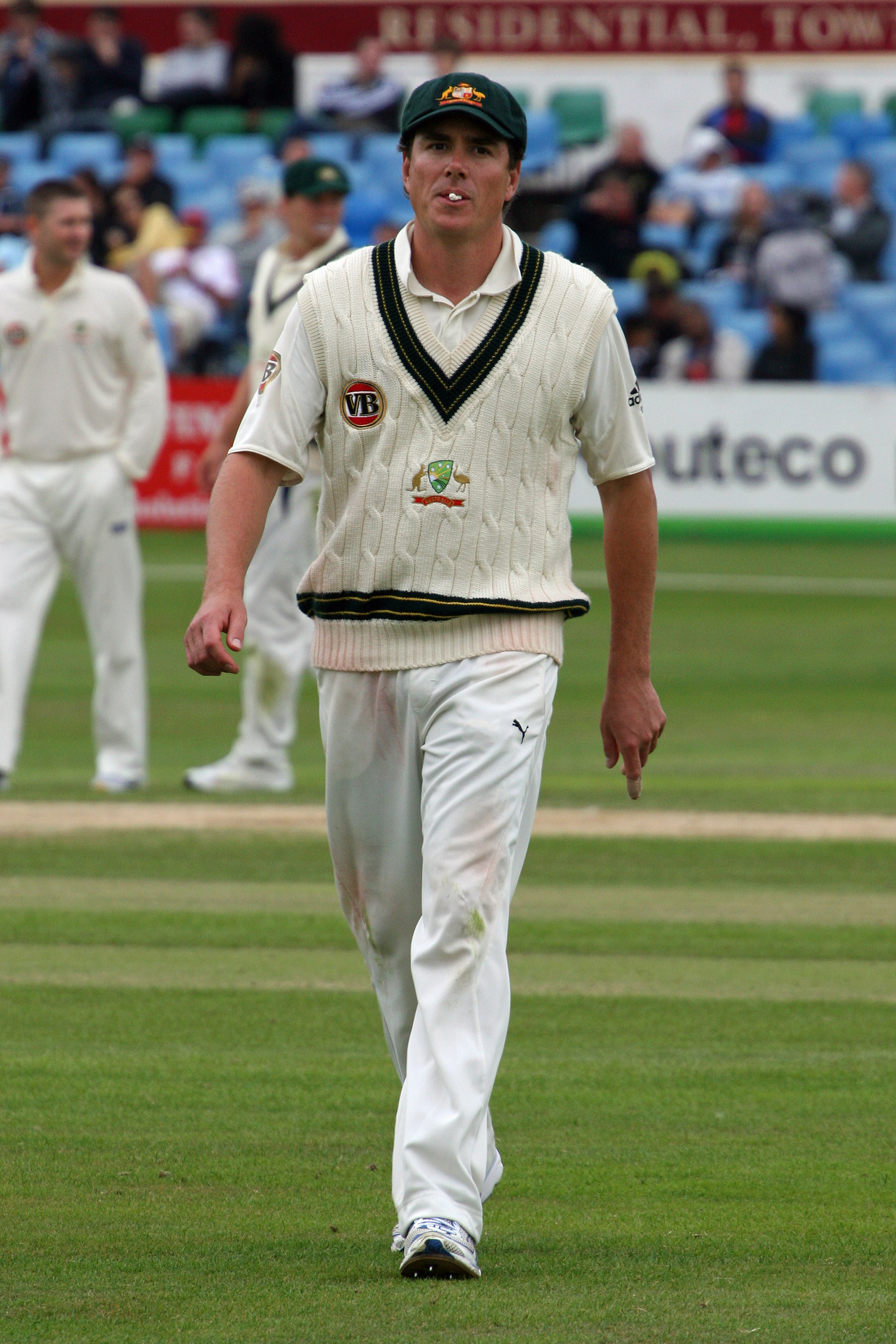

Personal information
- Full name: Marcus James North
- Born: 28 July 1979 (age 47); Pakenham, Victoria, Australia
- Nickname: Snorks
- Height: 187 cm (6 ft 2 in)
- Batting: Left-handed
- Bowling: Right-arm off break
- Role: Middle-order batsman

International information
- National side: Australia (2009-2010)
- Test debut (cap 409): 26 February 2009 v South Africa
- Last Test: 7 December 2010 v England
- ODI debut (cap 176): 1 May 2009 v Pakistan
- Last ODI: 3 May 2009 v Pakistan

Domestic team information
- Years: Team
- 1999/00–2013/14: Western Australia
- 2004: Durham
- 2005: Lancashire
- 2006: Derbyshire
- 2007–2008: Gloucestershire
- 2009: Hampshire
- 2011/12–2013/14: Perth Scorchers
- 2012–2013: Glamorgan
- 2013/14: Sydney Sixers
- 2014: Derbyshire

Career statistics
Competition	Test	ODI	FC	LA
Matches	21	2	214	181
Runs scored	1,171	6	13,764	5,312
Batting average	35.48	3.00	40.72	34.94
100s/50s	5/4	0/0	37/69	9/34
Top score	128	5	239*	137*
Balls bowled	1,258	18	12,455	2,885
Wickets	14	0	158	74
Bowling average	42.21	–	39.08	33.10
5 wickets in innings	1	–	3	0
10 wickets in match	0	–	0	0
Best bowling	6/55	–	6/55	4/26
Catches/stumpings	17/–	1/–	153/–	61/–
- Source: CricketArchive, 6 January 2015

Marcus James North (born 28 July 1979) is an Australian former international cricketer who played 21 Test matches and two One Day Internationals (ODIs) for the Australian national side. He is currently the men's national selector for England.

Born in the Melbourne suburb of Pakenham, North grew up in Western Australia, attending Kent Street Senior High School as part of their Specialist Cricket Program, and was a successful junior cricketer, entering the Australian Cricket Academy and playing under-19 cricket for Australia. He made his first-class debut for the academy in 1999, and his debut for the Western Australian cricket team the same year. Having established himself in the WA team, North debuted for Australia A during the 2002–03 season, and later began playing in the County Championship during the 2004 English cricket season, for Durham. In English cricket, he would go on to play for Lancashire (2005), Derbyshire (2006 and 2014), Gloucestershire (2007–2008), Hampshire (2009), and Glamorgan (2012–2013), becoming the first player of any nationality to represent six different counties.

North was made captain of Western Australia for the 2007–08 season, and was consistently selected for Australia A, which he also captained. A left-handed batsman, part-time right-arm off-break bowler and fields at either 1st or 3rd slip, North made his Test debut for Australia in February 2009, scoring a century on debut against South Africa. He played a further 20 Tests and two ODIs for Australia before being dropped from the side during the 2010–11 Ashes series. Upon the entry of the Perth Scorchers into the newly created Big Bash League, North was appointed the team's captain. However, in October 2012, North resigned as captain of both WA and the Scorchers to concentrate on his playing career. He retired from Australian domestic cricket at the end of the 2013–14 season. After his retirement, North moved to the north-east of England to play cricket at South Northumberland Cricket Club.

Between October 2018 and May 2026, North served as director of cricket for Durham.

== Youth career ==
North played junior cricket together with Mike Hussey at the Wanneroo Districts Cricket Club between 1994 and 1996. North had a very successful junior career that included playing for several Academy and national junior sides. North posted scores of 200 not out and 132 in a youth Test match against Pakistan in 1997. He made his first-class debut for the Australian Cricket Academy against a Matabeleland Invitation XI in Bulawayo during the academy's tour of Zimbabwe in 1999.

== Domestic career ==
North made his Pura Cup debut for Western Australia against Victoria in 1999. In October 2006, North and Chris Rogers compiled a record domestic third wicket partnership of 459 against Victoria at the WACA Ground in Perth, Western Australia, making his highest score of 239 not out in the process. In February 2007, North finished second to Rogers in the voting for Australia's best state player. With former Test player Justin Langer stepping down as captain of the Western Warriors, North was awarded the captaincy for the 2007–08 season. However injuries hampered his first season as captain, restricting him to only four first-class matches and three one-day matches.

North first played in England for Gateshead Fell in the North East Premier League in 2000. He also played some Natwest Trophy games for Durham Cricket Board. In the following season, North signed as the professional player for Colne Cricket Club in the Lancashire League. He returned to Gateshead Fell for the 2002 and 2003 seasons before signing to play county cricket for Durham as a replacement for Herschelle Gibbs. The following season he replaced Brad Hodge at Lancashire when Hodge was selected to be part of the Australia's 2005 Ashes series squad, and in 2006 he replaced Travis Birt at Derbyshire when Birt was selected in the Australia A side. North was signed as a replacement for New Zealander Hamish Marshall at Gloucestershire at the start of the 2007 county season. Despite only playing five matches he managed three centuries one of which won him the Walter Lawrence Trophy, the award for scoring for fastest century during the English season. He returned to Gloucestershire for the 2008 season, but played for Hampshire in the early County Championship season as a replacement for Imran Tahir. He signed a two-year deal for 2012 and 2013 as an overseas player for Glamorgan, becoming the first player to play first-class cricket for six different counties. He was appointed Glamorgan's one day captain for the 2013 season.

== International career ==
On 5 February 2009, North was called up to the Australia squad to face South Africa during Australia's tour of South Africa. North displayed a strong all-round performance in the only tour match against the Board President's XI where he scored two unbeaten half-centuries and claimed career-best bowling figures of 6/69 off 11 overs. North was selected to make his Test debut against South Africa in the First Test at the New Wanderers Stadium at Johannesburg, becoming the 409th Australian to earn a Test cap. He made his debut alongside fellow debutants Phillip Hughes and Ben Hilfenhaus. North scored his maiden Test century 117 runs in his first Test innings, becoming the first West Australian and the eighteenth Australian to score a century in his first Test, and the first Australian to do so against South Africa. In this match, North also claimed his first Test wicket, dismissing South African tailender Paul Harris.

On 11 July 2009, during the First Ashes Test of 2009, at Sophia Gardens in Cardiff, North scored his second Test century in his third Test match, 125 not out, sharing in a 200 run partnership with Brad Haddin, who also scored his second Test century in this innings. In the second innings of the Third Test, North made 96 in a 185 run partnership with Michael Clarke to help Australia secure a draw. He scored 110 in the fourth Ashes Test at Headingley, hitting a six to bring up his century.

During the First Test against Pakistan at Lords in July 2010, North took a Test-best haul of 6–55 in Pakistan's second innings, doubling his career test wickets tally in the process. North was dropped from the Australian test team on 10 December 2010 due to poor form during the 2010–11 Ashes series against England.

== Administrative roles ==
In 2018, following the departure of Geoff Cook from the role, North was appointed director of cricket at Durham. In May 2026, North was appointed as the national men's selector for England, following the departure of Luke Wright, who stood down following England's defeat in the 2025-26 Ashes series.

== Career best performances ==
	Batting				Bowling (innings)			
	Score	Fixture	Venue	Season	Figures	Fixture	Venue	Season
Test	128	Australia v India	Bangalore	2010	6/55	Australia v Pakistan	Lord's	2010
One Day International	5	Australia v Pakistan	Abu Dhabi	2009	-			
Twenty20 International	20	Australia v Pakistan	Dubai	2009	-			
First-class	239 not out	Western Australia v Victoria	Perth	2006	6/55	Australia v Pakistan	Lord's	2010
List A	137 not out	Glamorgan v Middlesex	Lord's	2013	4/26	Durham Cricket Board v Buckinghamshire	Beaconsfield	2001
Twenty20	70	Perth Scorchers v Adelaide Strikers	Perth	2012	2/19	Western Australia v Victoria	Melbourne	2007
