= Ben Hilfenhaus =

Australian cricketer (born 1983)

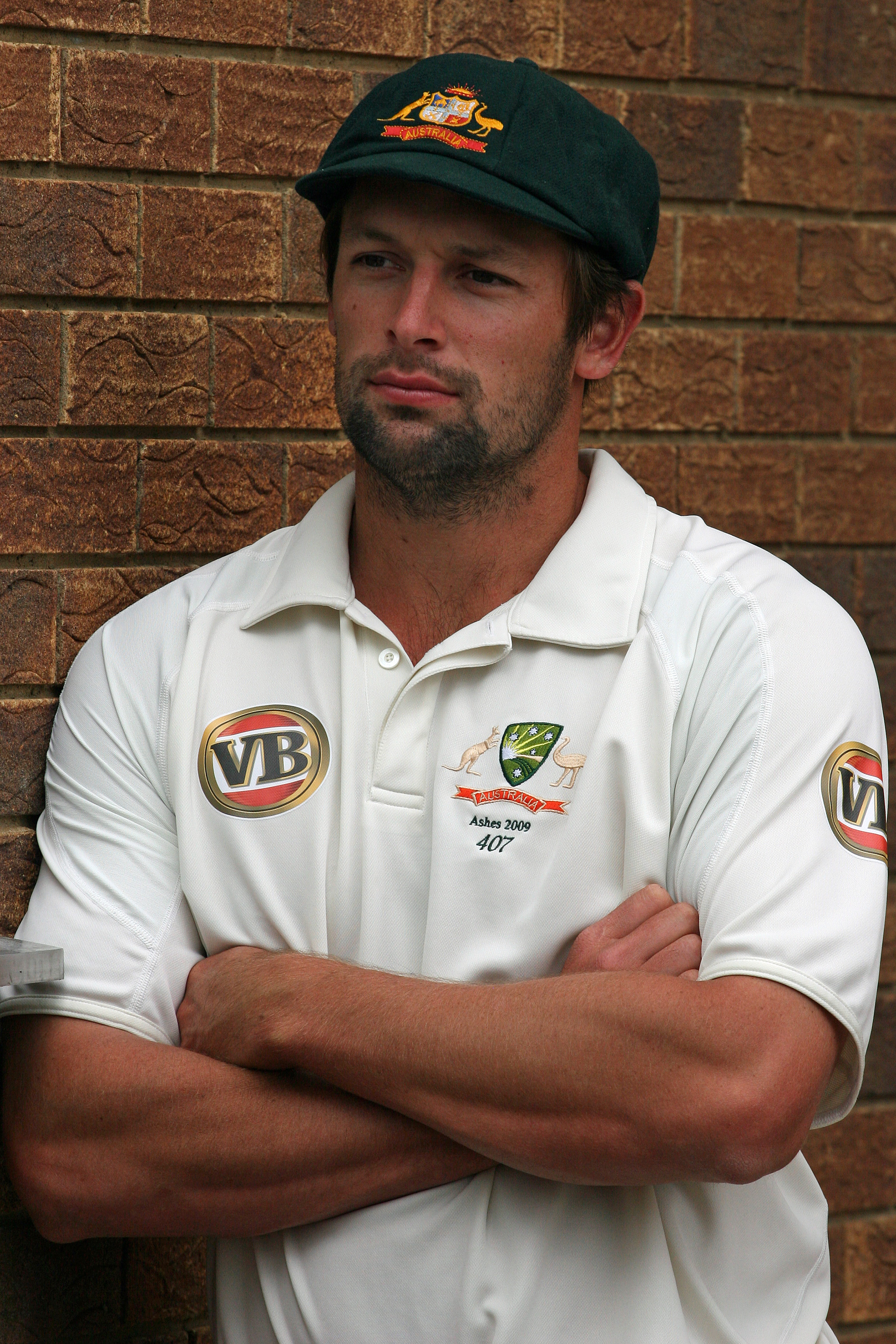
- Hilfenhaus in 2009

Personal information
- Full name: Benjamin William Hilfenhaus
- Born: 15 March 1983 (age 43); Ulverstone, Tasmania, Australia
- Nickname: Hilfy, Gentle Ben
- Height: 186 cm (6 ft 1 in)
- Batting: Right-handed
- Bowling: Right-arm fast-medium
- Role: Bowler

International information
- National side: Australia (2007–2012)
- Test debut (cap 407): 26 February 2009 v South Africa
- Last Test: 14 December 2012 v Sri Lanka
- ODI debut (cap 161): 14 January 2007 v New Zealand
- Last ODI: 25 March 2012 v West Indies
- ODI shirt no.: 20
- T20I debut (cap 21): 9 January 2006 v South Africa
- Last T20I: 5 September 2012 v Pakistan

Domestic team information
- Years: Team
- 2005/06–2015/16: Tasmania
- 2011/12–2014/15: Hobart Hurricanes
- 2012–2014: Chennai Super Kings
- 2015: Nottinghamshire
- 2015/16–2016/17: Melbourne Stars
- 2016/17: Canterbury
- 2017: St Kitts and Nevis Patriots

Career statistics
Competition	Test	ODI	FC	LA
Matches	27	25	104	78
Runs scored	355	29	1,410	119
Batting average	13.65	9.66	12.93	9.15
100s/50s	0/1	0/0	0/3	0/0
Top score	56*	16	56*	18*
Balls bowled	6,078	1,126	23,080	4,169
Wickets	99	29	387	89
Bowling average	27.50	37.06	29.34	35.95
5 wickets in innings	2	1	13	1
10 wickets in match	0	0	1	0
Best bowling	5/75	5/33	7/58	5/33
Catches/stumpings	7/0	10/–	30/–	20/–
Medal record
Representing Australia
ICC Champions Trophy
Winner	2009 South Africa
- Source: ESPNcricinfo, 12 May 2019

Benjamin William Hilfenhaus /ˈhɪlfənhaʊs/ (born 15 March 1983) is an Australian former professional cricketer who played for Tasmania in Australian domestic cricket and for the Australia national cricket team. He is right-arm fast-medium bowler known for his ability to swing the ball. Hilfenhaus plays club cricket for Tasmania University Cricket Club. He made his first-class cricket debut in the 2005/06 season and his haul of 39 wickets was a record for someone playing their first season for Tasmania. Before he was given a full-time contract for 2006/07, he worked as a bricklayer as well as playing cricket. He has best bowling figures of 7/58 in first-class cricket, achieved in his first season for Tasmania. During his time with Australia, Hilfenhaus won the 2009 ICC Champions Trophy.

In January 2007 Hilfenhaus made his One Day International (ODI) and Twenty20 International (T20I) debuts for Australia. The following month he was named the Bradman Young Cricketer of the Year. The 2006/07 season saw Hilfenhaus named Tasmania's Player of the Year as the club won the Pura Cup for the first time. Due to injury setbacks he had to wait until 2009 before making his Test debut.

In February 2016 Hilfenhaus announced his retirement from first-class cricket, due to ongoing injuries.

== Career ==
=== Early career: 2002–2008 ===
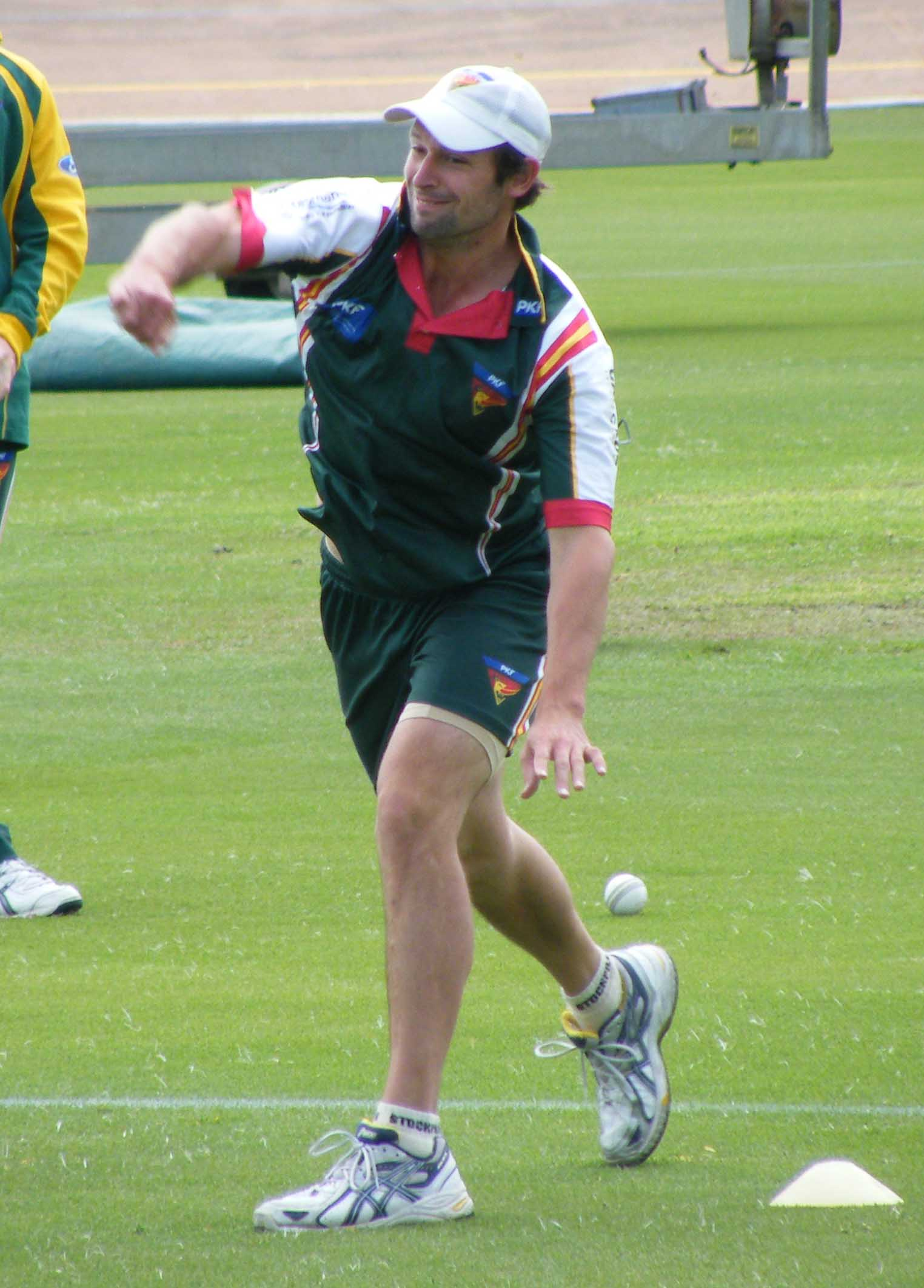
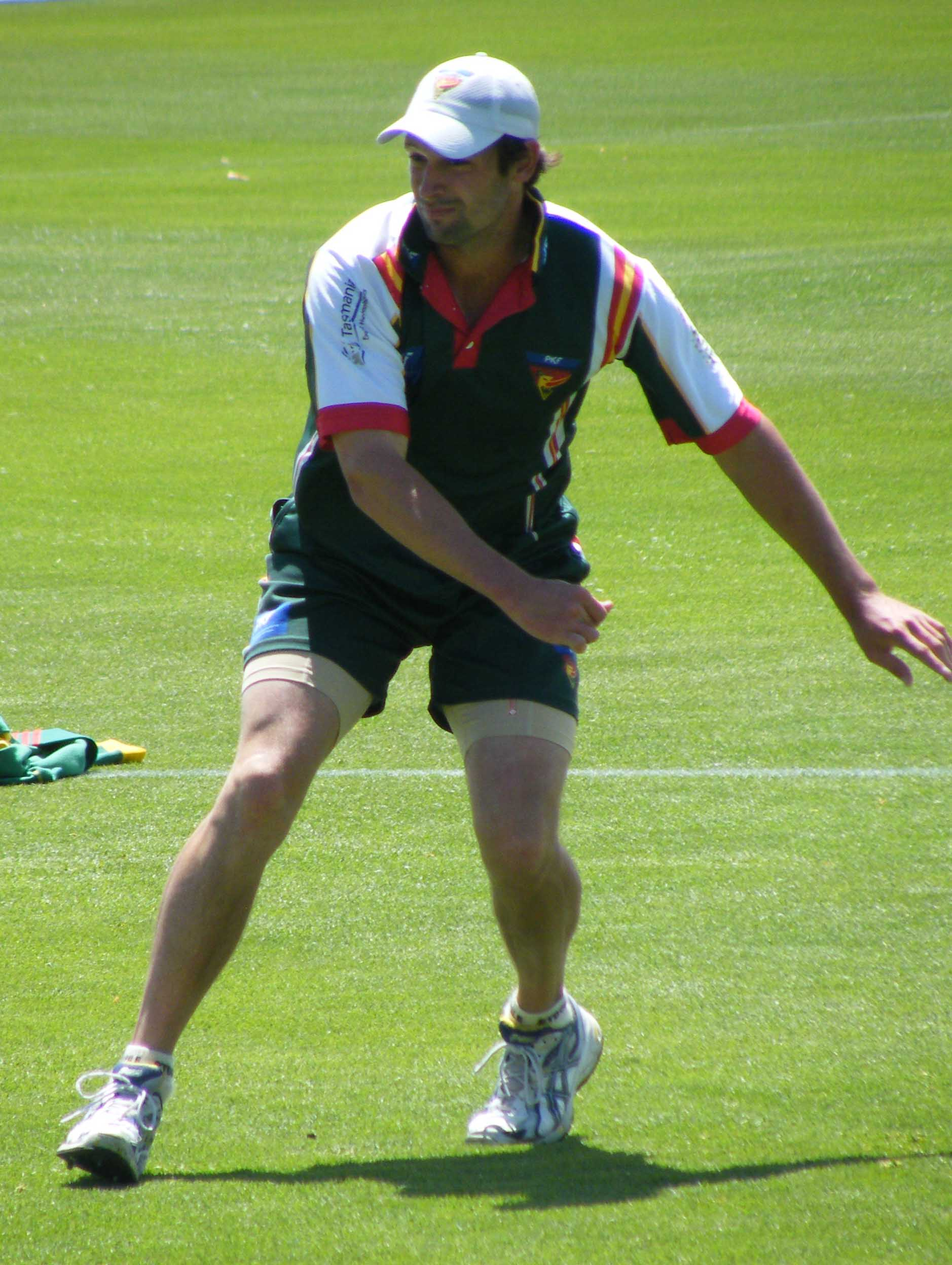
Ben Hilfenhaus training with Tasmania in 2008

The 19-year-old Hilfenhaus was one of 25 young players given scholarships to go to the Commonwealth Bank Cricket Academy in May 2002, and later that year he was given a rookie contract with Tasmania for the 2002/03 season. In 2003 Hilfenhaus was again included in the 25-man intake to the CB Cricket Academy. It was not until 17 October 2005 that he made his senior debut aged 22, playing for Tasmania in the Pura Cup, Australia's first-class competition. The match ended in a draw and Hilfenhaus took a single wicket, that of Mitchell Johnson bowled, while conceding 126 runs. For the 2005/06 season Hilfenhaus still had a rookie contract and also worked as a bricklayer. That season he claimed 39 wickets in the Pura Cup at an average of 30.82, breaking the record set by West Indian Michael Holding for most first-class wickets in their first season for Tasmania. Hilfenhaus was rewarded with a full contract with Tasmania for the first time and he was given a place in the Australia "A" squad for the winter Top End series. He had previously represented Australia at under-19 level.

The 2006/07 was even more successful for Hilfenhaus who won the Ricky Ponting Medal, awarded to Tasmania's Player of the Year. In eleven Pura Cup matches he took 60 wickets, including seven wickets in the final to help his team win the cup for the first time. Hilfenhaus made his International début in a Twenty20 international for Australia against England at the Sydney Cricket Ground on 9 January 2007. He bowled four overs and took two wickets for 16 runs. This was followed up by selection in the one-day team for the One Day International on 14 January against New Zealand at Bellerive Oval, his state team's home ground. He took his first ODI wicket (Brendon McCullum) in his second over. Hilfenhaus quickly became a local favourite, with the crowd cheering "Hilfy" whenever he was involved in play. In February, Hilfenhaus was named the Bradman Young Cricket of the Year.

Cricket Australia announced its 25 contracted players in May 2007 and Hilfenhaus was included in on the list for the first time. He was included in Australia's squad for the 2007 Twenty20 World Championship, his first tour with the senior national side, as a replacement for Shaun Tait, and in the One Day International tour of India. He also received a call up to the Test squad to take on Sri Lanka when South Australian fast bowler Shaun Tait was ruled out with injury. However, he did not get to add to his international appearances on any of the above occasions.

Hilfenhaus was chosen in Australia's 15-man Test squad to tour the West Indies in May 2008. A stress fracture of the back prevented him from departing with the touring party and ruled him out of playing. Fellow fast bowler Doug Bollinger was selected in his place.

=== Test debut and 2009 Ashes ===
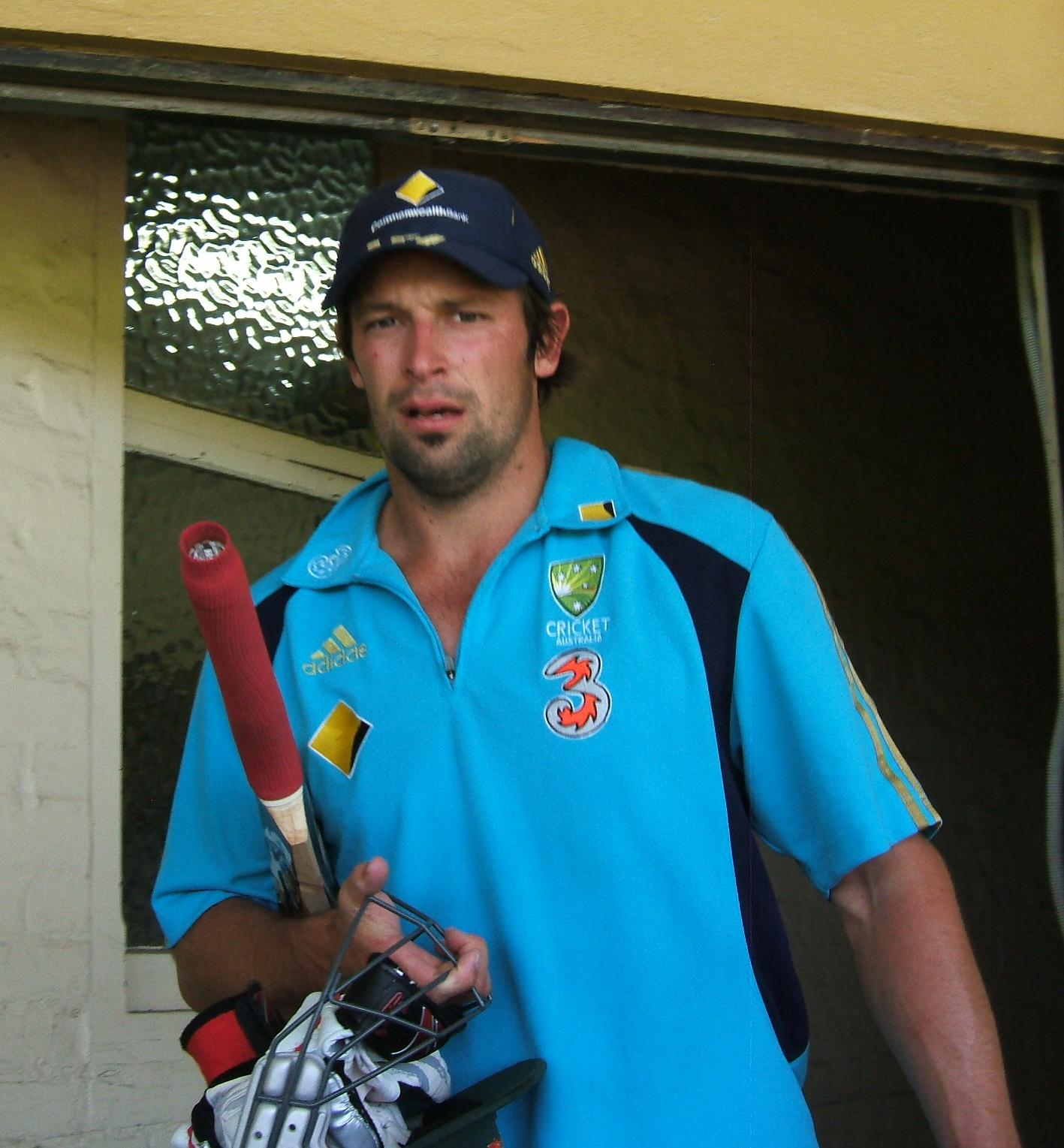
Hilfenhaus in 2009.

After losing the home Test series against South Africa in December 2008, Australia embarked on a tour of South Africa in February 2009 needing to avoid losing the series to retain the top spot in the ICC's Test rankings. Hilfenhaus debuted in the first Test, one of three frontline fast bowlers alongside Mitchell Johnson and Peter Siddle. Between them they had experience of 22 Tests compared to the 144 South Africa's quicks had played in. Australia won the series 2–1 and Hilfenhaus played in all three matches, taking 7 wickets while conceding 366 runs.

Hilfenhaus was given a chance in the 2009 Ashes after a solid performance in South Africa and an injury to Brett Lee. He grabbed his chance, swinging the new and old ball, along with bowling an accurate length. Though Australia lost the series 2–1, Hilfenhaus was the leading wicket-taker for either side with 22 dismissals from all five Tests at an average of 27.45.

In November 2009, the West Indies toured for three Tests. His performance in the first Test, with match figures of 5/70, earned Hilfenhaus a Man-of-the-Match award as Australia won by an innings. Experiencing knee soreness after the match, Hilfenhaus was unable to play in the second Test despite hopes the injury was not serious. The injury, which turned out to be tendonitis in the knee and prevented him from playing a further part in the series, worsened when Hilfenhaus returned to playing in grade cricket.

Hilfenhaus returned to the Test side when it travelled to England where they would face Pakistan in two Tests in July. His knee was still painful, but Hilfenhaus played regardless. The series was drawn 1–1 and Australia's fast bowlers were often inconsistent. Hilfenhaus was Australia's second highest wicket-taker in the series, with eight at an average of 23.75. In October Australia toured India for two Tests and Hilfenhaus was included in the 15-man squad. At this point, India were the number one ranked Test team in the world and Australia had dropped to fourth. India won both Tests and Hilfenhaus' six wickets for 261 runs made him Australia's second highest wicket-taker in the series.

=== 2011 Ashes onwards ===
Australia lost the 2010–11 Ashes series 3–1. Across the five Tests, Australia used four front-line fast bowlers: Mitchell Johnson, Peter Siddle, Ryan Harris, and Hilfenhaus with support from all-rounder Shane Watson. Though he missed a match, Hilfenhaus bowled the most out of all Australia's bowlers in the series, sending down 947 deliveries. However, on average his seven wickets cost 59.28 runs each.

Though Hilfenhaus was bought by Chennai Super Kings for a price of $100,000, he did not play in the 2011 Indian Premier League (IPL) held in April due to injury. He recovered in time to be included in the Australia A squad to tour Zimbabwe in June. The intention was to give him the opportunity to find some form before the full Australia team toured Sri Lanka and South Africa later that year. The squad also contained Mitchell Starc, James Faulkner, and Trent Copeland, and it was hoped that Hilfenhaus' experience would benefit the younger fast bowlers, particularly as Starc and Faulkner had the ability to swing the ball. When the squad to tour Sri Lanka was announced in July, Hilfenhaus was omitted, according to selector Greg Chappell this was because he was not fit enough.

By the time New Zealand toured for two Tests in December, Hilfenhaus was back in contention for a place in the national squad. However, the selectors opted to give younger, less experienced bowlers an opportunity. When India toured later that month Hilfenhaus was included in the 13-man squad for the first Test. National selector John Inverarity explained that "I think [Hilfenhaus] had a few body concerns and his action deteriorated a little bit last year and he seems to have got it back and been playing in very good form. He is a strong, durable, experienced bowler." He was selected for the first Test—the Boxing Day Test—and took 5/75 in India's first innings, his first five-wicket haul in Test cricket. In the following match Hilfenhaus claimed a second five-wicket haul to help Australia take a 2–0 lead in the series. Australia won the third Test by an innings to claim the Border–Gavaskar Trophy. Hilfenhaus took four wickets in each of India's innings and as a result broke into the top 10 of the ICC's ranking for Test bowlers for the first time. He was the leading wicket-taker in the series, with 27 at an average of 17.22.

An injury to Brett Lee and Hilfenhaus' form in the Test series against India meant the latter was included in the ODI squad for a tri-nation tournament in February. At the time, Hilfenhaus had not played an ODI since 2009. In his first match back in the side he took career best ODI figures of 5/33 against India. This effort won him the Man of the match award. Australia won the tournament and Hilfenhaus played in five of Australia's eleven matches, taking a further four wickets to finish with a series average of 23.22. In April 2012, Australia toured the West Indies. Hilfenhaus took ten wickets from three Test, and was Australia's second highest wicket-taker in the series behind off-spinner Nathan Lyon. The 2012 Indian Premier League was held in April and May. Having missed the previous year through injury, it was Hilfenhaus' first tournament for the Chennai Super Kings. He picked up 12 wickets at an average of 17.33 and was one of the team's main bowlers.

== Bowling style ==
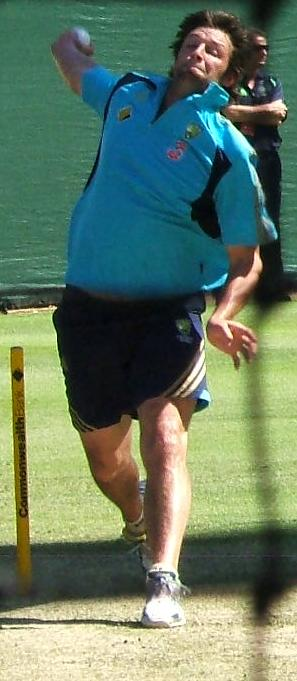
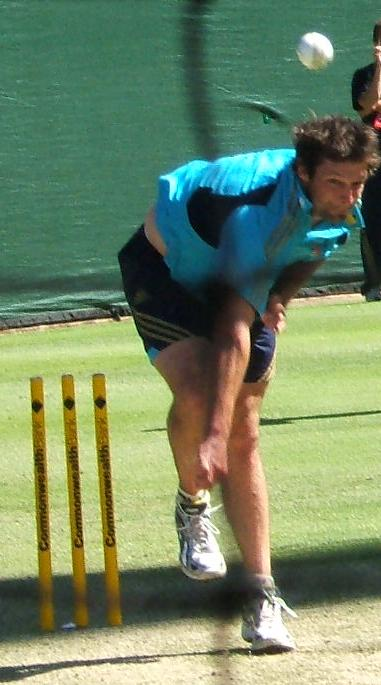
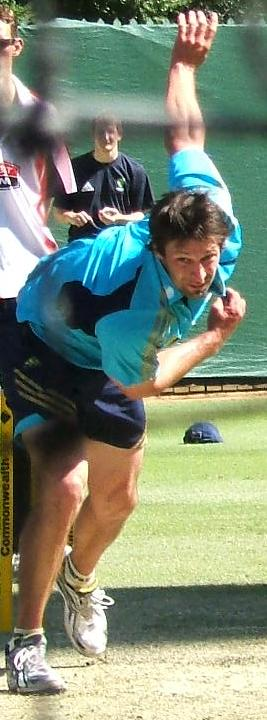
Ben Hilfenhaus bowling in the nets in January 2009

Hilfenhaus is primarily a swing bowler, relying on moving the ball away from right-handed batsmen. During an interview in 2010, he explained that he is able to bowl when conditions do not suit him: "When the ball's not swinging for me the role does change a little bit ... I see myself more as a dot bowler than a wicket-taker like Mitch [Johnson] when the ball stops swinging for me. I've just got to build pressure and do the team thing."

The onset of tendonitis in Hilfenhaus' knee in late 2009 led to a change in his bowling action. As a result, he was bowling slower and the ball was swinging earlier, and therefore easier for batsmen to face. This predictability resulted in an expensive 2010 Ashes series for Hilfenhaus. After being dropped from the Test side, Hilfenhaus was encouraged by his captain at Tasmania, George Bailey, to use more variation in angle and length. On his return to the national side in later 2011, his pace had increased to around 140 to 145 km/h (87 to 90 mph). There have been several comparisons made between Hilfenhaus and Glenn McGrath and McGrath himself described him as "very impressive".

== Personal ==
Hilfenhaus, of German ancestry, is an avid golfer with an eight handicap and was Mr September in the McGrath Foundation's 2009 Men of Cricket calendar. Hilfenhaus has been nicknamed Gentle Ben by his Australian teammates in reference to his gentle personality and the popular bear from the 1970s TV series.
