= West Indies at the Men's T20 World Cup =

West Indies team performance at T20 World Cup

The West Indies cricket team is one of the full members of the International Cricket Council (ICC). They are the joint most successful team along with England and India, having won two titles in 2012 and 2016. The team has appeared in every edition of the tournament, and also have been hosts of the 2010 and 2024 editions. They had also reached the semifinals of the tournament twice in 2009 and 2014. In nine editions, the team has a win-loss record of 24-20 wins in 46 matches.

== T20 World Cup record ==
Key
Champions
Runners-up
Semi-finals
Host

Year	Round	Position	GP	W	L	T	NR	Ab (Note: Abandoned matches are not counted in the official records.)	Captain
(South Africa) 2007	Group stage	11/12	2	0	2	0	0	0	Ramnaresh Sarwan
(England) 2009	Semi-final	4/12	6	3	3	0	0	0	Chris Gayle
(Cricket West Indies) 2010	Super 8	6/12	5	3	2	0	1	0	Chris Gayle
(Sri Lanka) 2012	Champions	1/12	7	3	2	1	1	0	Darren Sammy
(Bangladesh) 2014	Semi-final	3/16	5	3	2	0	0	0	Darren Sammy
(India) 2016	Champions	1/16	6	5	1	0	0	0	Darren Sammy
(United Arab Emirates) (Oman) 2021	Super 12	9/16	5	1	4	0	0	0	Kieron Pollard
(Australia) 2022	Group stage	15/16	3	1	2	0	0	0	Nicholas Pooran
(Cricket West Indies) (United States) 2024	Super 8	5/20	7	5	2	0	0	0	Rovman Powell
(India) (Sri Lanka) 2026	Super 8	6/20	7	5	2	0	0	0	Shai Hope
(Australia) (New Zealand) 2028	Qualified								
Total	2 titles	10/10	53	29	22	0	1	1	—N/a

=== Record by opponents ===
Opponent	M	W	L	T+W	T+L	NR	Ab	Win %	First played
Afghanistan	2	1	1	0	0	0	0	50.00	2016
Australia	6	3	3	0	0	0	0	50.00	2009
Bangladesh	3	2	1	0	0	0	0	66.67	2007
England	8	6	2	0	0	0	0	71.42	2009
India	5	3	2	0	0	0	0	60.00	2009
Ireland	3	1	1	0	0	1	0	33.33	2010
Italy	1	1	0	0	0	0	0	100	2026
Nepal	1	1	0	0	0	0	0	100	2026
New Zealand	2	1	0	1	0	0	0	75.00	2012
Pakistan	1	1	0	0	0	0	0	100	2014
Papua New Guinea	1	1	0	0	0	0	0	100	2024
Scotland	2	1	1	0	0	0	0	50.00	2022
South Africa	6	1	5	0	0	0	0	16.67	2007
Sri Lanka	8	2	6	0	0	0	0	25.00	2009
Uganda	1	1	0	0	0	0	0	100	2024
United States	1	1	0	0	0	0	0	100	2024
Zimbabwe	2	2	0	0	0	0	0	100	2022
Total	53	29	22	1	0	1	0	56.66	—
Source: Last Updated: 8 March 2026

== Tournament results ==
=== South Africa 2007 ===
Squad

- Ramnaresh Sarwan (c)
- Shivnarine Chanderpaul
- Narsingh Deonarine
- Runako Morton
- Denesh Ramdin (wk)
- Marlon Samuels
- Devon Smith
- Dwayne Bravo
- Chris Gayle
- Daren Sammy
- Dwayne Smith
- Pedro Collins
- Fidel Edwards
- Daren Powell
- Ravi Rampaul

Results

Event	Group stage (Group A)			Super 8s				Semifinal	Final	Overall Result
Event	Opposition Result	Opposition Result	Rank	Opposition Result	Opposition Result	Opposition Result	Rank	Opposition Result	Opposition Result	Overall Result
2007	South Africa; Lost by 8 wickets	Bangladesh; Lost by 6 wickets	3	Did not advance						Group stage
Source: Cricinfo

Scorecards

Group stage (Group B)

11 September
18:00
(scorecard)

West Indies; 205/6 (20 overs)	v	South Africa; 208/2 (17.4 overs)
Chris Gayle 117 (57); Johan van der Wath 2/33 (4 overs)		Herschelle Gibbs 90 (55); Fidel Edwards 1/21 (3 overs)

South Africa won by 8 wickets
Wanderers Stadium, Johannesburg
Umpires: Mark Benson (Eng) and Daryl Harper (Aus)
Player of the match: Chris Gayle (WI)

- South Africa won the toss and elected to field.
- Chris Gayle became the first person to hit a century in an official Twenty20 International. He also scored the most sixes in one innings of Twenty20 with 10.
- The West Indian first-wicket partnership of 145 between Chris Gayle and Devon Smith was the highest in Twenty20 international cricket.

13 September
10:00
(scorecard)

West Indies; 164/8 (20 overs)	v	Bangladesh; 165/4 (18 overs)
Devon Smith 51 (52); Shakib Al Hasan 4/34 (4 overs)		Aftab Ahmed 62 (49); Ramnaresh Sarwan 2/10 (2 overs)

Bangladesh won by 6 wickets
Wanderers Stadium, Johannesburg
Umpires: Mark Benson (Eng) and Nigel Llong (Eng)
Player of the match: Mohammad Ashraful (Ban)

- Bangladesh won the toss and elected to field.

=== England 2009 ===
Squad

- Chris Gayle (c)
- Denesh Ramdin (vc, wk)
- Lionel Baker
- Sulieman Benn
- David Bernard
- Dwayne Bravo
- Shivnarine Chanderpaul
- Fidel Edwards
- Andre Fletcher
- Xavier Marshall
- Kieron Pollard
- Darren Sammy
- Ramnaresh Sarwan
- Lendl Simmons
- Jerome Taylor

Results

Event	Group stage (Group C)			Super 8s (Group E)				Semifinal	Final	Overall Result
Event	Opposition Result	Opposition Result	Rank	Opposition Result	Opposition Result	Opposition Result	Rank	Opposition Result	Opposition Result	Overall Result
2009	Australia; Won by 7 wickets	Sri Lanka; Lost by 15 runs	2	India; Won by 7 wickets	South Africa; Lost by 20 runs	England; Won by 5 wickets (DLS)	2	Sri Lanka; Lost by 57 runs	Did not advance	Semi-final
Source: Cricinfo

Scorecards

Group stage (Group C)

6 June 2009
14:00
Scorecard

Australia; 169/7 (20 overs)	v	West Indies; 172/3 (15.5 overs)
David Warner 63 (53); Dwayne Bravo 2/31 (4 overs)		Chris Gayle 88 (50); Mitchell Johnson 2/36 (3.5 overs)

West Indies won by 7 wickets
The Oval, London
Umpires: Aleem Dar (Pak) and Asad Rauf (Pak)
Player of the match: Chris Gayle (WI)

- Australia won the toss and elected to bat.

10 June 2009
13:30
Scorecard

Sri Lanka; 192/5 (20 overs)	v	West Indies; 177/5 (20 overs)
Sanath Jayasuriya 81 (47); Lendl Simmons 4/19 (3 overs)		Dwayne Bravo 51 (38); Ajantha Mendis 2/25 (4 overs)

Sri Lanka won by 15 runs
Trent Bridge, Nottingham
Umpires: Billy Bowden (NZ) and Simon Taufel (Aus)
Player of the match: Sanath Jayasuriya (SL)

- West Indies won the toss and elected to field

Super 8 (Group E)

12 June 2009
17:30 (D/N)
Scorecard

India; 153/7 (20 overs)	v	West Indies; 156/3 (18.4 overs)
Yuvraj Singh 67 (43); Dwayne Bravo 4/38 (4 overs)		Dwayne Bravo 66* (36); Irfan Pathan 1/9 (2 overs)

West Indies won by 7 wickets
Lord's, London
Umpires: Aleem Dar (Pak) and Rudi Koertzen (SA)
Player of the match: Dwayne Bravo (WI)

- India won the toss and elected to bat.

13 June 2009
13:30
Scorecard

South Africa; 183/7 (20 overs)	v	West Indies; 163/9 (20 overs)
Herschelle Gibbs 55 (35); Jerome Taylor 3/30 (4 overs)		Lendl Simmons 77 (50); Wayne Parnell 4/14 (4 overs)

South Africa won by 20 runs
The Oval, London
Umpires: Aleem Dar (Pak) and Mark Benson (Eng)
Player of the match: Wayne Parnell (SA)

- West Indies won the toss and elected to field.

15 June 2009
17:30 (D/N)
Scorecard

England; 161/6 (20 overs)	v	West Indies; 82/5 (8.2 overs)
Ravi Bopara 55 (47); Dwayne Bravo 2/30 (4 overs)		Ramnaresh Sarwan 19* (9); Adil Rashid 1/11 (1 over)

West Indies won by 5 wickets (D/L)
The Oval, London
Umpires: Aleem Dar (Pak) and Rudi Koertzen (SA)
Player of the match: Ramnaresh Sarwan (WI)

- England won the toss and elected to bat.
- Rain revised the West Indies' target to 80 runs from 9 overs according to the Duckworth–Lewis method.
- West Indies qualified for the semi-finals as a result of this match.

=== West Indies 2010 ===
Squad

- Chris Gayle (c)
- Denesh Ramdin (vc, wk)
- Sulieman Benn
- Shivnarine Chanderpaul
- Daren Sammy
- Kieron Pollard
- Dwayne Bravo
- Nikita Miller
- Ravi Rampaul
- Ramnaresh Sarwan
- Andre Fletcher
- Wavell Hinds
- Jerome Taylor
- Kemar Roach
- Narsingh Deonarine

Results

Event	Group stage (Group D)			Super 8s (Group F)				Semifinal	Final	Overall Result
Event	Opposition Result	Opposition Result	Rank	Opposition Result	Opposition Result	Opposition Result	Rank	Opposition Result	Opposition Result	Overall Result
2010	Ireland; Won by 70 runs	England; Won by 8 wickets (DLS)	1	Sri Lanka; Lost by 57 runs	India; Won by 14 runs	Australia; Lost by 6 wickets	3	Did not advance		Super 8
Source: Cricinfo

Scorecards

Group stage (Group D)

30 April 2010
17:00 (D/N)
Scorecard

West Indies; 138/9 (20 overs)	v	Ireland; 68 (16.4 overs)
Darren Sammy 30 (17); George Dockrell 3/16 (4 overs)		Gary Wilson 17 (34); Darren Sammy 3/8 (3.4 overs)

West Indies won by 70 runs
Providence Stadium, Guyana
Umpires: Asad Rauf (Pak) and Billy Bowden (NZ)
Player of the match: Darren Sammy (WI)

- West Indies won the toss and elected to bat.

3 May 2010
13:30
Scorecard

England; 191/5 (20 overs)	v	West Indies; 60/2 (5.5 overs)
Eoin Morgan 55 (35); Darren Sammy 2/22 (4 overs)		Chris Gayle 25 (12); Graeme Swann 2/24 (2 overs)

West Indies won by 8 wickets (D/L)
Providence Stadium, Guyana
Umpires: Tony Hill (NZ) and Rudi Koertzen (SA)
Player of the match: Darren Sammy (WI)

- West Indies won the toss and elected to field.
- Rain reduced the West Indies innings to 6 overs. According to the Duckworth–Lewis method, their target was 60 runs.
- West Indies qualified for the Super 8s as a result of this match.

Super 8 (Group F)

7 May 2010
13:30
Scorecard

Sri Lanka; 195/3 (20 overs)	v	West Indies; 138/8 (20 overs)
Mahela Jayawardene 98* (56); Kemar Roach 2/27 (4 overs)		Ramnaresh Sarwan 28 (33); Ajantha Mendis 3/24 (4 overs)

Sri Lanka won by 57 runs
Kensington Oval, Bridgetown
Umpires: Rudi Koertzen (SA) and Simon Taufel (Aus)
Player of the match: Mahela Jayawardene (SL)

- Sri Lanka won the toss and elected to bat.

9 May 2010
09:30
Scorecard

West Indies; 169/6 (20 overs)	v	India; 155/9 (20 overs)
Chris Gayle 98 (66); Ashish Nehra 3/35 (4 overs)		Suresh Raina 32 (25); Kemar Roach 2/38 (4 overs)

West Indies won by 14 runs
Kensington Oval, Bridgetown
Umpires: Billy Bowden (NZ) and Simon Taufel (Aus)
Player of the match: Chris Gayle (WI)

- India won the toss and elected to field.

11 May 2010
17:00 (D/N)
Scorecard

West Indies; 105 (19 overs)	v	Australia; 109/4 (16.2 overs)
Ramnaresh Sarwan 26 (31); Steve Smith 3/20 (4 overs)		Brad Haddin 42 (46); Chris Gayle 1/5 (0.2 overs)

Australia won by 6 wickets
Beausejour Stadium, Gros Islet
Umpires: Billy Bowden (NZ) and Rudi Koertzen (SA)
Player of the match: Steve Smith (Aus)

- West Indies won the toss and elected to bat.

=== Sri Lanka 2012 ===
Squad

- Chris Gayle (c)
- Denesh Ramdin (vc, wk)
- Johnson Charles
- Darren Bravo
- Lendl Simmons
- Marlon Samuels
- Dwayne Bravo (vc)
- Kieron Pollard
- Dwayne Smith
- Sunil Narine
- Andre Russell
- Samuel Badree
- Ravi Rampaul
- Fidel Edwards
- Daren Sammy

Results

Event	Group stage (Group B)			Super 8s (Group E)				Semifinal	Final	Overall Result
Event	Opposition Result	Opposition Result	Rank	Opposition Result	Opposition Result	Opposition Result	Rank	Opposition Result	Opposition Result	Overall Result
2012	Australia; Lost by 17 runs (DLS)	Ireland; No result	2	England; Won by 15 runs	Sri Lanka; Lost by 9 wickets	New Zealand; Tied (Won the S/O)	2	Australia; Won by 74 runs	Sri Lanka; Won by 36 runs	Winners
Source: Cricinfo

Scorecards

Group stage (Group B)

22 September 2012
19:30 (D/N)
Scorecard

West Indies; 191/8 (20 overs)	v	Australia; 100/1 (9.1 overs)
Chris Gayle 54 (33); Mitchell Starc 3/35 (4 overs)		Shane Watson 41* (24); Fidel Edwards 1/16 (2 overs)

Australia won by 17 runs (D/L method)
R. Premadasa Stadium, Colombo
Umpires: Aleem Dar (Pak) and Asad Rauf (Pak)
Player of the match: Shane Watson (Aus)

- West Indies won the toss and elected to bat
- Match abandoned after 9.1 overs due to rain
- D/L par score at 9.1 overs with one wicket lost was 83, hence the winning margin was 17 runs
- Australia qualified for the Super Eights as a result of this match

24 September 2012
19:30 (D/N)
Scorecard

Ireland; 129/6 (19 overs)	v	West Indies
Niall O'Brien 25 (21); Chris Gayle 2/21 (3 overs)

No result
R. Premadasa Stadium, Colombo
Umpires: Asad Rauf (Pak) and Kumar Dharmasena (SL)

- West Indies won the toss and elected to field
- The match was reduced to 19 overs per side due to rain
- Match abandoned before West Indies could start their innings
- West Indies qualified for the Super 8 by virtue of a superior Net run rate.

Super 8 (Group E)

27 September 2012
19:30 (D/N)
Scorecard

West Indies; 179/5 (20 overs)	v	England; 164/4 (20 overs)
Johnson Charles 84 (56); Stuart Broad 2/26 (4 overs)		Eoin Morgan 71* (36); Ravi Rampaul 2/37 (4 overs)

West Indies won by 15 runs
Pallekele International Cricket Stadium, Pallekele
Umpires: Asad Rauf (Pak) and Steve Davis (Aus)
Player of the match: Johnson Charles (WI)

- West Indies won the toss and elected to bat

29 September 2012
19:30 (D/N)
Scorecard

West Indies; 129/5 (20 overs)	v	Sri Lanka; 130/1 (15.2 overs)
Marlon Samuels 50 (35); Nuwan Kulasekara 2/12 (4.0 overs)		Mahela Jayawardene 65* (49); Ravi Rampaul 1/39 (4 overs)

Sri Lanka won by 9 wickets
Pallekele International Cricket Stadium, Pallekele
Umpires: Aleem Dar (Pak) and Steve Davis (Aus)
Player of the match: Mahela Jayawardene (SL)

- West Indies won the toss and elected to bat

1 October 2012
15:30 (D/N)
Scorecard

West Indies; 139 (19.3 overs)	v	New Zealand; 139/7 (20 overs)
Chris Gayle 30 (14); Tim Southee 3/21 (4 overs)		Ross Taylor 62* (40); Sunil Narine 3/20 (4 overs)

Match tied; West Indies won the Super Over
Pallekele International Cricket Stadium, Pallekele
Umpires: Aleem Dar (Pak) and Asad Rauf (Pak)
Player of the match: Sunil Narine (WI)

- New Zealand won the toss and elected to field

=== Bangladesh 2014 ===
Squad

- Chris Gayle (c)
- Denesh Ramdin (wk)
- Johnson Charles (wk)
- Darren Bravo
- Lendl Simmons
- Marlon Samuels
- Dwayne Bravo
- Andre Fletcher (wk)
- Dwayne Smith
- Sunil Narine
- Andre Russell
- Samuel Badree
- Sheldon Cottrell
- Ravi Rampaul
- Krishmar Santokie

Results

Event	First stage		Super 10 (Group 2)					Semifinal	Final	Overall Result
Event	Opposition Result	Rank	Opposition Result	Opposition Result	Opposition Result	Opposition Result	Rank	Opposition Result	Opposition Result	Overall Result
2014	Advanced to next stage directly		India; Lost by 7 wicket	Bangladesh; Won by 73 runs	Australia; Won by 6 wickets	Pakistan; Won by 84 runs	2	Sri Lanka; Lost by 27 runs (DLS)	Did not advance	Semi-final
Source: Cricinfo

Scorecards

Super 10 (Group 2)

23 March 2014
19:30 (D/N)
Scorecard

West Indies; 129/7 (20 overs)	v	India; 130/3 (19.4 overs)
Chris Gayle 34 (33); Ravindra Jadeja 3/48 (4 overs)		Rohit Sharma 62* (55); Andre Russell 1/12 (2 overs)

India won by 7 wickets
Sher-e-Bangla National Cricket Stadium, Dhaka
Umpires: Kumar Dharmasena (SL) and Richard Illingworth (Eng)
Player of the match: Amit Mishra (Ind)

- India won the toss and elected to field.

25 March 2014
19:30 (D/N)
Scorecard

West Indies; 171/7 (20 overs)	v	Bangladesh; 98 (19.1 overs)
Dwayne Smith 72 (43); Al-Amin Hossain 3/21 (4 overs)		Mushfiqur Rahim 22 (22); Samuel Badree 4/15 (4 overs)

West Indies won by 73 runs
Sher-e-Bangla National Cricket Stadium, Dhaka
Umpires: Richard Kettleborough (Eng) and Nigel Llong (Eng)
Player of the match: Dwayne Smith (WI)

- Bangladesh won the toss and elected to field

28 March 2014
15:30
Scorecard

Australia; 178/8 (20 overs)	v	West Indies; 179/4 (19.4 overs)
Glenn Maxwell 45 (22); Sunil Narine 2/19 (4 overs)		Chris Gayle 53 (35); Mitchell Starc 2/50 (4 overs)

West Indies won by 6 wickets
Sher-e-Bangla National Cricket Stadium, Dhaka
Umpires: Marais Erasmus (RSA) and Ian Gould (Eng)
Player of the match: Darren Sammy (WI)

- Australia won the toss and elected to bat

1 April 2014
19:30 (D/N)
Scorecard

West Indies; 166/6 (20 overs)	v	Pakistan; 82 (17.5 overs)
Dwayne Bravo 46 (26); Mohammad Hafeez 1/15 (2 overs)		Mohammad Hafeez 19 (32); Samuel Badree 3/10 (4 overs)

West Indies won by 84 runs
Sher-e-Bangla National Cricket Stadium, Dhaka
Umpires: Ian Gould (Eng) and Richard Kettleborough (Eng)
Player of the match: Dwayne Bravo (WI)

- West Indies won the toss and elected to bat
- West Indies qualified for the Semi-finals as a result of this match.

Knockout stage

Semi-final 1
3 April
19:00 (D/N)
Scorecard

Sri Lanka; 160/6 (20 overs)	v	West Indies; 80/4 (13.5 overs)
Lahiru Thirimanne 44 (35); Krishmar Santokie 2/46 (4 overs)		Dwayne Bravo 30 (19); Lasith Malinga 2/5 (2 overs)

Sri Lanka won by 27 runs (D/L method)
Sher-e-Bangla National Cricket Stadium, Dhaka
Umpires: Richard Kettleborough (Eng) and Rod Tucker (Aus)
Player of the match: Angelo Mathews (SL)

- Sri Lanka won the toss and elected to bat
- Rain and hail ended the match after 13.5 overs in the West Indies' innings. Their par score was 107 runs according to the Duckworth–Lewis method.

=== India 2016 ===
Squad

- Darren Sammy (c)
- Jason Holder (vc)
- Chris Gayle
- Johnson Charles
- Marlon Samuels
- Evin Lewis
- Dwayne Bravo
- Denesh Ramdin (wk)
- Andre Russell
- Carlos Brathwaite
- Ashley Nurse
- Jerome Taylor
- Sulieman Benn
- Samuel Badree
- Lendl Simmons

Results

Event	First stage		Super 10 (Group 1)					Semifinal	Final	Overall Result
Event	Opposition Result	Rank	Opposition Result	Opposition Result	Opposition Result	Opposition Result	Rank	Opposition Result	Opposition Result	Overall Result
2016	Advanced to next stage directly		England; Won by 6 wickets	Sri Lanka; Won by 7 wickets	South Africa; Won by 3 wickets	Afghanistan; Lost by 6 runs	1	India; Won by 7 wickets	England; Won by 4 wickets	Winners
Source: Cricinfo

Scorecards

Super 10 (Group 1)

16 March
19:30 (D/N)
Scorecard

England; 182/6 (20 overs)	v	West Indies; 183/4 (18.1 overs)
Joe Root 48 (36); Andre Russell 2/36 (4 overs)		Chris Gayle 100* (48); Adil Rashid 1/20 (2 overs)

West Indies won by 6 wickets
Wankhede Stadium, Mumbai
Umpires: Chris Gaffaney (NZ) and Rod Tucker (Aus)
Player of the match: Chris Gayle (WI)

- West Indies won the toss and elected to field.
- Chris Gayle (WI) scored the fastest century in a World Twenty20 match (47 balls).
- Chris Gayle became the second player to score two centuries in T20Is and first player to score two centuries in World Twenty20 tournaments. His eleven sixes is the most in an innings at the World Twenty20.
- Chris Gayle scored the most sixes in T20I matches (98) and the most sixes in World Twenty20 matches (60).

20 March
19:30 (D/N)
Scorecard

Sri Lanka; 122/9 (20 overs)	v	West Indies; 127/3 (18.2 overs)
Thisara Perera 40 (29); Samuel Badree 3/12 (4 overs)		Andre Fletcher 84* (64); Milinda Siriwardana 2/33 (4 overs)

West Indies won by 7 wickets
M. Chinnaswamy Stadium, Bangalore
Umpires: Aleem Dar (Pak) and Johan Cloete (SA)
Player of the match: Andre Fletcher (WI)

- West Indies won the toss and elected to field.

25 March
19:30 (D/N)
Scorecard

South Africa; 122/8 (20 overs)	v	West Indies; 123/7 (19.4 overs)
Quinton de Kock 47 (46); Chris Gayle 2/17 (3 overs)		Marlon Samuels 43 (44); Imran Tahir 2/13 (4 overs)

West Indies won by 3 wickets
Vidarbha Cricket Association Stadium, Nagpur
Umpires: Ian Gould (Eng) and Richard Kettleborough (Eng)
Player of the match: Marlon Samuels (WI)

- West Indies won the toss and elected to field.
- West Indies qualified for the semi-finals as a result of this match.
- Marlon Samuels became the second player for the West Indies to pass 1,000 runs in T20Is.
- Dwayne Bravo became the third player for the West Indies to pass 1,000 runs in T20Is.

27 March
15:00 (D/N)
Scorecard

Afghanistan; 123/7 (20 overs)	v	West Indies; 117/8 (20 overs)
Najibullah Zadran 48 (40); Samuel Badree 3/14 (4 overs)		Dwayne Bravo 28 (29); Rashid Khan 2/26 (4 overs); Mohammad Nabi 2/26 (4 overs)

Afghanistan won by 6 runs
Vidarbha Cricket Association Stadium, Nagpur
Umpires: Aleem Dar (Pak) and Bruce Oxenford (Aus)
Player of the match: Najibullah Zadran (Afg)

- West Indies won the toss and elected to field.

Knockout stage

Semi-final 2
31 March
19:00 (D/N)
Scorecard

India; 192/2 (20 overs)	v	West Indies; 196/3 (19.4 overs)
Virat Kohli 89* (47); Samuel Badree 1/26 (4 overs)		Lendl Simmons 82* (51); Virat Kohli 1/15 (1.4 overs)

West Indies won by 7 wickets
Wankhede Stadium, Mumbai
Umpires: Ian Gould (Eng) and Richard Kettleborough (Eng)
Player of the match: Lendl Simmons (WI)

- West Indies won the toss and elected to field.
- West Indies made the highest successful run chase in a knockout match of a World Twenty20 tournament.

Final
3 April
19:00 (D/N)
Scorecard

England; 155/9 (20 overs)	v	West Indies; 161/6 (19.4 overs)
Joe Root 54 (36); Carlos Brathwaite 3/23 (4 overs)		Marlon Samuels 85* (66); David Willey 3/20 (4 overs)

West Indies won by 4 wickets
Eden Gardens, Kolkata
Umpires: Kumar Dharmasena (SL) and Rod Tucker (Aus)
Player of the match: Marlon Samuels (WI)

- West Indies won the toss and elected to field.
- Marlon Samuels (WI) made the highest score in a World T20 final.
- West Indies became the first team to win both the men's and women's World Twenty20s on the same day, with the women defeating Australia by 8 wickets.

=== Oman & UAE 2021 ===
Squad and kit

- Kieron Pollard (c)
- Nicholas Pooran (vc, wk)
- Andre Fletcher
- Evin Lewis
- Lendl Simmons
- Shimron Hetmyer
- Darren Bravo
- Roston Chase
- Andre Russell
- Jason Holder
- Dwayne Bravo
- Hayden Walsh Jr.
- Akeal Hosein
- Chris Gayle
- Sheldon Cottrell
- Oshane Thomas

Reserve players:

- Sheldon Cottrell
- Darren Bravo

2021 kit

Results

Event	First round		Super 12 (Group 1)						Semifinal	Final	Overall Result
Event	Opposition Result	Rank	Opposition Result	Opposition Result	Opposition Result	Opposition Result	Opposition Result	Rank	Opposition Result	Opposition Result	Overall Result
2021	Advanced to next stage directly		England; Lost by 6 wickets	South Africa; Lost by 8 wickets	Bangladesh; Won by 3 runs	Sri Lanka; Lost by 20 runs	Australia; Lost by 8 wickets	5	Did not advance		Super 12
Source: Cricinfo

Scorecards

Super 12 (Group 1)

23 October 2021
18:00 (N)
Scorecard

West Indies; 55 (14.2 overs)	v	England; 56/4 (8.2 overs)
Chris Gayle 13 (13); Adil Rashid 4/2 (2.2 overs)		Jos Buttler 24* (22); Akeal Hosein 2/24 (4 overs)

England won by 6 wickets
Dubai International Cricket Stadium, Dubai
Umpires: Aleem Dar (Pak) and Marais Erasmus (SA)
Player of the match: Moeen Ali (Eng)

- England won the toss and elected to field.
- The West Indies' total was the lowest by a Full Member team in a men's T20 World Cup match.

26 October 2021
14:00
Scorecard

West Indies; 143/8 (20 overs)	v	South Africa; 144/2 (18.2 overs)
Evin Lewis 56 (35); Dwaine Pretorius 3/17 (2 overs)		Aiden Markram 51* (26); Akeal Hosein 1/27 (4 overs)

South Africa won by 8 wickets
Dubai International Cricket Stadium, Dubai
Umpires: Aleem Dar (Pak) and Paul Reiffel (Aus)
Player of the match: Anrich Nortje (SA)

- South Africa won the toss and elected to field.

29 October 2021
14:00
Scorecard

West Indies; 142/7 (20 overs)	v	Bangladesh; 139/5 (20 overs)
Nicholas Pooran 40 (22); Shoriful Islam 2/20 (4 overs)		Litton Das 44 (43); Jason Holder 1/22 (4 overs)

West Indies won by 3 runs
Sharjah Cricket Stadium, Sharjah
Umpires: Adrian Holdstock (SA) and Rod Tucker (Aus)
Player of the match: Nicholas Pooran (WI)

- Bangladesh won the toss and elected to field.

4 November 2021
18:00 (N)
Scorecard

Sri Lanka; 189/3 (20 overs)	v	West Indies; 169/8 (20 overs)
Charith Asalanka 68 (41); Andre Russell 2/33 (4 overs)		Shimron Hetmyer 81* (54); Wanindu Hasaranga 2/19 (4 overs)

Sri Lanka won by 20 runs
Sheikh Zayed Cricket Stadium, Abu Dhabi
Umpires: Aleem Dar (Pak) and Langton Rusere (Zim)
Player of the match: Charith Asalanka (SL)

- West Indies won the toss and elected to field.
- West Indies are eliminated as a result of this match.

6 November 2021
14:00
Scorecard

West Indies; 157/7 (20 overs)	v	Australia; 161/2 (16.2 overs)
Kieron Pollard 44 (31); Josh Hazlewood 4/39 (4 overs)		David Warner 89* (56); Chris Gayle 1/7 (1 over)

Australia won by 8 wickets
Sheikh Zayed Cricket Stadium, Abu Dhabi
Umpires: Richard Illingworth (Eng) and Langton Rusere (Zim)
Player of the match: David Warner (Aus)

- Australia won the toss and elected to field.

=== Australia 2022 ===
Squad and kit

- Nicholas Pooran (c, wk)
- Rovman Powell (vc)
- Johnson Charles
- Evin Lewis
- Shamarh Brooks
- Brandon King
- Jason Holder
- Kyle Mayers
- Raymon Reifer
- Odean Smith
- Yannic Cariah
- Sheldon Cottrell
- Akeal Hosein
- Alzarri Joseph
- Obed McCoy

2022 kit

Results

Event	First round (Group B)				Super 12		Semifinal	Final	Overall Result
Event	Opposition Result	Opposition Result	Opposition Result	Rank	Opposition Result	Rank	Opposition Result	Opposition Result	Overall Result
2022	Scotland; Lost by 42 runs	Ireland; Lost by 6 wickets	Zimbabwe; Won by 31 runs	4	Did not advance				First round
Source: Cricinfo

Scorecards

First round (Group B)

17 October 2022
15:00
Scorecard

Scotland; 160/5 (20 overs)	v	West Indies; 118 (18.3 overs)
George Munsey 66* (53); Jason Holder 2/14 (3 overs)		Jason Holder 38 (33); Mark Watt 3/12 (4 overs)

Scotland won by 42 runs
Bellerive Oval, Hobart
Umpires: Aleem Dar (Pak) and Paul Wilson (Aus)
Player of the match: George Munsey (Sco)

- West Indies won the toss and elected to field.

19 October 2022
19:00 (N)
Scorecard

West Indies; 153/7 (20 overs)	v	Zimbabwe; 122 (18.2 overs)
Johnson Charles 45 (36); Sikandar Raza 3/19 (4 overs)		Luke Jongwe 29 (22); Alzarri Joseph 4/16 (4 overs)

West Indies won by 31 runs
Bellerive Oval, Hobart
Umpires: Aleem Dar (Pak) and Paul Wilson (Aus)
Player of the match: Alzarri Joseph (WI)

- West Indies won the toss and elected to bat.

21 October 2022
15:00
Scorecard

West Indies; 146/5 (20 overs)	v	Ireland; 150/1 (17.3 overs)
Brandon King 62* (48); Gareth Delany 3/16 (4 overs)		Paul Stirling 66* (48); Akeal Hosein 1/38 (4 overs)

Ireland won by 9 wickets
Bellerive Oval, Hobart
Umpires: Chris Gaffaney (NZ) and Ahsan Raza (Pak)
Player of the match: Gareth Delany (Ire)

- West Indies won the toss and elected to bat.
- West Indies were eliminated as a result of this match.

=== United States & West Indies 2024 ===
Squad and kit

- Rovman Powell (c)
- Alzarri Joseph (vc)
- Johnson Charles
- Shimron Hetmyer
- Shai Hope
- Nicholas Pooran (wk)
- Sherfane Rutherford
- Andre Russell
- Roston Chase
- Romario Shepherd
- Gudakesh Motie
- Akeal Hosein
- Shamar Joseph
- Obed McCoy
- Kyle Mayers

Reserve players:

- Fabian Allen
- Andre Fletcher
- Matthew Forde
- Hayden Walsh Jr.

2024 kit

Results

Event	Group stage (Group C)					Super 8 (Group 2)				Semifinal	Final	Overall Result
Event	Opposition Result	Opposition Result	Opposition Result	Opposition Result	Rank	Opposition Result	Opposition Result	Opposition Result	Rank	Opposition Result	Opposition Result	Overall Result
2024	Papua New Guinea; Won by 5 wickets	Uganda; Won by 134 runs	New Zealand; Won by 13 runs	Afghanistan; Won by 104 runs	1	England; Lost by 8 wickets	United States; Won by 9 wickets	South Africa; Lost by 3 wickets (DLS)	3	Did not advance		Super 8
Source: Cricinfo

Scorecards

Group stage (Group C)

2 June 2024
10:30 UTC−4
Scorecard

Papua New Guinea; 136/8 (20 overs)	v	West Indies; 137/5 (19 overs)
Sese Bau 50 (43); Andre Russell 2/19 (3 overs)		Roston Chase 42* (27); Assad Vala 2/28 (4 overs)

West Indies won by 5 wickets
Providence Stadium, Guyana
Umpires: Adrian Holdstock (SA) and Rashid Riaz (Pak)
Player of the match: Roston Chase (WI)

- West Indies won the toss and elected to field.

8 June 2024
20:30 UTC−4 (N)
Scorecard

West Indies; 173/5 (20 overs)	v	Uganda; 39 (12 overs)
Johnson Charles 44 (42); Brian Masaba 2/31 (4 overs)		Juma Miyagi 13* (20); Akeal Hosein 5/11 (4 overs)

West Indies won by 134 runs
Providence Stadium, Guyana
Umpires: Kumar Dharmasena (SL) and Rashid Riaz (Pak)
Player of the match: Akeal Hosein (WI)

- West Indies won the toss and elected to bat.
- Akeal Hosein (WI) took his maiden five-wicket haul in T20Is.
- This was West Indies highest winning margin by runs in T20I cricket.

12 June 2024
20:30 UTC−4 (N)
Scorecard

West Indies; 149/9 (20 overs)	v	New Zealand; 136/9 (20 overs)
Sherfane Rutherford 68* (39); Trent Boult 3/16 (4 overs)		Glenn Phillips 40 (33); Alzarri Joseph 4/19 (4 overs)

West Indies won by 13 runs
Brian Lara Cricket Academy, San Fernando
Umpires: Ahsan Raza (Pak) and Alex Wharf (Eng)
Player of the match: Sherfane Rutherford (WI)

- New Zealand won the toss and elected to field.
- Nicholas Pooran became the leading run-scorer for West Indies in T20Is, passing the previous record of 1,899 runs set by Chris Gayle.
- West Indies qualified for the Super 8 as a result of this match.

17 June 2024
20:30 UTC−4 (N)
Scorecard

West Indies; 218/5 (20 overs)	v	Afghanistan; 114 (16.2 overs)
Nicholas Pooran 98 (53); Gulbadin Naib 2/14 (2 overs)		Ibrahim Zadran 38 (28); Obed McCoy 3/14 (3 overs)

West Indies won by 104 runs
Daren Sammy Cricket Ground, Gros Islet
Umpires: Chris Brown (NZ) and Allahudien Paleker (SA)
Player of the match: Nicholas Pooran (WI)

- Afghanistan won the toss and elected to field.
- Nicholas Pooran (WI) scored 36 runs in an over off of Azmatullah Omarzai (Afg), the second such instance in a T20 World Cup match and fifth in T20Is overall.

Super 8 (Group 2)

19 June 2024
20:30 UTC−4 (N)
Scorecard

West Indies; 180/4 (20 overs)	v	England; 181/2 (17.3 overs)
Johnson Charles 38 (34); Moeen Ali 1/15 (2 overs)		Phil Salt 87* (47); Roston Chase 1/19 (3 overs)

England won by 8 wickets
Daren Sammy Cricket Ground, Gros Islet
Umpires: Nitin Menon (Ind) and Ahsan Raza (Pak)
Player of the match: Phil Salt (Eng)

- England won the toss and elected to field.

21 June 2024
20:30 UTC−4 (N)
Scorecard

United States; 128 (19.5 overs)	v	West Indies; 130/1 (10.5 overs)
Andries Gous 29 (16); Roston Chase 3/19 (4 overs)		Shai Hope 82* (39); Harmeet Singh 1/18 (2 overs)

West Indies won by 9 wickets
Kensington Oval, Bridgetown
Umpires: Allahudien Paleker (SA) and Paul Reiffel (Aus)
Player of the match: Roston Chase (WI)

- West Indies won the toss and elected to field.

23 June 2024
20:30 UTC−4 (N)
Scorecard

West Indies; 135/8 (20 overs)	v	South Africa; 124/7 (16.1 overs)
Roston Chase 52 (42); Tabraiz Shamsi 3/27 (4 overs)		Tristan Stubbs 29 (27); Roston Chase 3/12 (3 overs)

South Africa won by 3 wickets (DLS method)
Sir Vivian Richards Stadium, North Sound
Umpires: Rod Tucker (Aus) and Alex Wharf (Eng)
Player of the match: Tabraiz Shamsi (SA)

- South Africa won the toss and elected to field.
- South Africa were set a revised target of 123 runs off 17 overs due to rain.

=== India & Sri Lanka 2026 ===
Squad and kit

- Shai Hope (c, wk)
- Shimron Hetmyer
- Matthew Forde
- Akeal Hosein
- Roston Chase
- Romario Shepherd
- Johnson Charles
- Jayden Seales
- Quentin Sampson
- Rovman Powell
- Brandon King
- Gudakesh Motie
- Sherfane Rutherford
- Shamar Joseph
- Jason Holder

2026 kit

Results

Group stage (Group C)					Super 8 (Group 1)				Semifinal	Final	Overall Result
Opposition Result	Opposition Result	Opposition Result	Opposition Result	Rank	Opposition Result	Opposition Result	Opposition Result	Rank	Opposition Result	Opposition Result	Overall Result
Scotland; Won by 35 runs	England; Won by 30 runs	Nepal; Won by 9 wickets	Italy; Won by 42 runs	1	Zimbabwe; Won by 107 runs	South Africa; Lost by 9 wickets	India; Lost by 5 wickets	3	Did not advance		Super 8
Source: Cricinfo

Scorecards

Group stage (Group C)

Match 2
7 February 2026
15:00 UTC+5:30 (D/N)
Scorecard

West Indies; 182/5 (20 overs)	v	Scotland; 147 (18.5 overs)
Shimron Hetmyer 64 (36); Brad Currie 2/23 (4 overs)		Richie Berrington 42 (24); Romario Shepherd 5/20 (3)

West Indies won by 35 runs
Eden Gardens, Kolkata
Attendance: 15,080
Umpires: Nitin Menon (Ind) and Sam Nogajski (Aus)
Player of the match: Shimron Hetmyer (WI)

- Scotland won the toss and elected to field.
- Oliver Davidson (Sco) made his T20I debut.
- Tom Bruce played his first T20I for Scotland after having previously played 17 T20Is for New Zealand, becoming the 24th cricketer to represent two international teams in T20Is.
- Shimron Hetmyer (WI) broke Chris Gayle's record of the fastest half-century by a West Indies batter in the T20 World Cup (22 balls).
- Jason Holder (WI) became the first player for West Indies to take 100 wickets in T20Is.
- Romario Shepherd (WI) took his second hat-trick and maiden five-wicket haul in T20Is and the 13th overall in T20 World Cups. This was the first hat-trick in this edition and overall the tenth in the T20 World Cup.

Match 15
11 February 2026
19:00 UTC+5:30 (N)
Scorecard

West Indies; 196/6 (20 overs)	v	England; 166 (19 overs)
Sherfane Rutherford 76* (42); Adil Rashid 2/16 (4 overs)		Sam Curran 43* (30); Gudakesh Motie 3/33 (4 overs)

West Indies won by 30 runs
Wankhede Stadium, Mumbai
Attendance: 21,577
Umpires: Donovan Koch (Aus) and Allahuddien Paleker (SA)
Player of the match: Sherfane Rutherford (WI)

- England won the toss and elected to field.

Match 25
15 February 2026
11:00 UTC+5:30
Scorecard

Nepal; 133/8 (20 overs)	v	West Indies; 134/1 (15.2 overs)
Dipendra Singh Airee 58 (47); Jason Holder 4/27 (4 overs)		Shai Hope 61* (44); Nandan Yadav 1/24 (3 overs)

West Indies won by 9 wickets
Wankhede Stadium, Mumbai
Attendance: 19,225
Umpires: Gazi Sohel (Ban) and Alex Wharf (Eng)
Player of the match: Jason Holder (WI)

- West Indies won the toss and elected to field.
- West Indies qualified for the Super 8 while Nepal were eliminated as a result of this match.

Match 37
19 February 2026
11:00 UTC+5:30
Scorecard

West Indies; 165/6 (20 overs)	v	Italy; 123 (18 overs)
Shai Hope 75 (46); Crishan Kalugamage 2/25 (4 overs)		Ben Manenti 26 (21); Shamar Joseph 4/30 (4 overs)

West Indies won by 42 runs
Eden Gardens, Kolkata
Umpires: Adrian Holdstock (SA) and Langton Rusere (Zim)
Player of the match: Shai Hope (WI)

- Italy won the toss and elected to field.
- Jason Holder (WI) played in his 300th international match.

Super 8 (Group 1)

Match 44
23 February 2026
19:00 UTC+5:30 (N)
Scorecard

West Indies; 254/6 (20 overs)	v	Zimbabwe; 147 (17.4 overs)
Shimron Hetmyer 85 (34); Blessing Muzarabani 2/42 (4 overs)		Brad Evans 43 (21); Gudakesh Motie 4/28 (4 overs)

West Indies won by 107 runs
Wankhede Stadium, Mumbai
Attendance: 19,199
Umpires: Richard Illingworth (Eng) and Jayaraman Madanagopal (Ind)
Player of the match: Shimron Hetmyer (WI)

- Zimbabwe won the toss and elected to field.
- Shimron Hetmyer (WI) scored the fastest half-century (19 balls) for West Indies in T20Is.
- West Indies recorded the second highest total in the T20 World Cup.
- Brad Evans and Richard Ngarava (Zim) recorded the highest partnership for the 10th wicket in the T20 World Cup.

Match 47
26 February 2026
15:00 UTC+5:30 (D/N)
Scorecard

West Indies; 176/8 (20 overs)	v	South Africa; 177/1 (16.1 overs)
Romario Shepherd 52* (37); Lungi Ngidi 3/30 (4 overs)		Aiden Markram 82* (46); Roston Chase 1/46 (4 overs)

South Africa won by 9 wickets
Narendra Modi Stadium, Ahmedabad
Attendance: 28,422
Umpires: Kumar Dharmasena (SL) and Sharfuddoula (Ban)
Player of the match: Aiden Markram (SA)

- South Africa won the toss and elected to field.
- Jason Holder and Romario Shepherd (WI) recorded the highest partnership for the 8th wicket in T20Is.

Match 52
1 March 2026
19:00 UTC+5:30 (N)
Scorecard

West Indies; 195/4 (20 overs)	v	India; 199/5 (19.2 overs)
Roston Chase 40 (25); Jasprit Bumrah 2/36 (4 overs)		Sanju Samson 97* (50); Jason Holder 2/38 (4 overs)

India won by 5 wickets
Eden Gardens, Kolkata
Attendance: 58,354
Umpires: Chris Gaffaney (NZ) and Alex Wharf (Eng)
Player of the match: Sanju Samson (Ind)

- India won the toss and elected to field.
- This was India's highest successful run-chase in the T20 World Cup.
- India qualified for their third consecutive and overall sixth T20 World Cup semi-final while West Indies were eliminated as a result of this match.

== Records and statistics ==
=== Team records ===
Highest innings totals

Score	Opponent	Venue	Season
254/6 (20 overs)	Zimbabwe	Mumbai	2026
218/5 (20 overs)	Afghanistan	Gros Islet	2024
205/6 (20 overs)	South Africa	Johannesburg	2007
205/4 (20 overs)	Australia	Colombo	2012
196/3 (19.4 overs)	India	Mumbai	2016
191/8 (20 overs)	Australia	Colombo	2012
Last updated: 25 February 2026

=== Most appearances ===
This list consists players with most number of matches at the T20 World Cup. Dwayne Bravo has played most matches, with a total of 34 matches.

Matches	Player	Period
34	Dwayne Bravo	2007-2021
33	Chris Gayle	2007-2021
29	Denesh Ramdin	2007-2016
29	Andre Russell	2012-2024
25	Daren Sammy	2009-2016
23	Kieron Pollard	2009-2021
Last updated: 23 June 2024

=== Batting statistics ===
Most runs

Runs	Player	Mat	Inn	HS	Avg	100s	50s	Period
965	Chris Gayle	33	31	117	34.46	2	7	2007–2021
530	Marlon Samuels	20	19	85*	31.17	—N/a	4	2007–2016
530	Dwayne Bravo	34	30	66*	21.20	—N/a	2	2007–2021
456	Johnson Charles	21	20	84	22.80	—N/a	2	2012–2021
356	Nicholas Pooran	15	15	98	25.42	—N/a	1	2021–2024
Last updated: 23 June 2024

Highest partnerships

Runs	Players	Opposition	Venue	Season
145 (1st wicket)	Dwayne Smith (35) & Chris Gayle (98)	v South Africa	Johannesburg	2007
133 (1st wicket)	Chris Gayle (72) & Andre Fletcher (53)	v Australia	Kennington	2009
103 (1st wicket)	Chris Gayle (58) & Johnson Charles (40)	v England	Pallekele	2012
97 (1st wicket)	Dwayne Smith (72) & Chris Gayle (19)	v Bangladesh	Dhaka	2014
97 (3rd wicket)	Lendl Simmons (47) & Johnson Charles (47)	v India	Mumbai	2016
Last updated: 23 June 2024

=== Bowling statistics ===
Most wickets

Wickets	Player	Matches	Avg.	Econ.	BBI	4W	5W	Period
29	Andre Russell	29	20.58	8.21	3/31	0	0	2012–2024
27	Dwayne Bravo	34	28.96	8.81	4/38	1	0	2007–2021
24	Samuel Badree	15	13.50	5.52	4/15	1	0	2012–2016
19	Alzarri Joseph	10	13.68	7.12	4/16	2	0	2022–2024
17	Ravi Rampaul	15	26.05	8.71	3/16	0	0	2007–2021
Last updated: 23 June 2024
