= 2014 Caribbean Premier League =

Second season of the Caribbean Premier League

- Dates: 11 July 2014 – 16 August 2014
- Administrator: CPL Limited
- Cricket format: Twenty20
- Tournament format(s): Group stage and knockout
- Champions: Barbados Tridents (1st title)
- Runners-up: Guyana Amazon Warriors
- Participants: 6
- Matches: 30
- Attendance: 250,754 (8,358 per match)
- Player of the series: Lendl Simmons (Guyana Amazon Warriors)
- Most runs: Lendl Simmons (Guyana Amazon Warriors) (446 runs)
- Most wickets: Ravi Rampaul (Barbados Tridents) (18 wickets)
- Official website: cplt20.com

The 2014 Caribbean Premier League or for sponsorship reasons, Limacol CPL 2014 was the second season of the Caribbean Premier League, established by the West Indies Cricket Board. It began on 11 July and ended 16 August.

== Points table ==
Pos	Team	Pld	W	L	NR	Pts	NRR	Qualification
1	Barbados Tridents	9	6	3	0	12	0.860	Advanced to The Final
2	Guyana Amazon Warriors	9	6	3	0	12	0.414	Advanced to Semi-final 2
3	Trinbago Knight Riders	9	6	3	0	12	0.317	Advanced to Semi-final 1
4	Jamaica Tallawahs	9	6	3	0	12	−0.124	Advanced to Semi-final 1
5	St Lucia Kings	9	2	7	0	4	−0.790	
6	Antigua Hawksbills	9	1	8	0	2	−0.820	

Source: ESPNCricinfo

== Group stage ==
11 July
14:00 (D/N)
Scorecard

Antigua Hawksbills; 136/8 (20 overs)	v	Guyana Amazon Warriors; 140/8 (19.3 overs)
Ben Dunk 38 (21); Jimmy Neesham 3/33 (4 overs)		Denesh Ramdin 51 (36); Sheldon Cottrell 3/24 (4 overs)

Guyana won by 2 wickets
National Cricket Stadium, St George's, Grenada
Umpires: Nigel Duguid and Peter Nero
Player of the match: Denesh Ramdin (Guyana)

- Guyana Amazon Warriors won the toss and elected to field

12 July
10:30 (D/N)
Scorecard

Barbados Tridents; 124/6 (20 overs)	v	Trinbago Knight Riders; 125/3 (17.3 overs)
Shane Dowrich 37 (38); Kevin O'Brien 2/6 (2 overs)		Ross Taylor 62 (51); Ravi Rampaul 2/18 (3 overs)

Trinbago won by 7 wickets
National Cricket Stadium, St George's, Grenada
Umpires: Patrick Gustard and Peter Nero
Player of the match: Ross Taylor (Trinidad and Tobago)

- Trinidad and Tobago Red Steel won the toss and elected to field

13 July
14:30 (D/N)
Scorecard

St Lucia Stars; 161/5 (20 overs)	v	Jamaica Tallawahs; 162/3 (19 overs)
Henry Davids 56 (38); Andre Russell 2/27 (3 overs)		Chris Gayle 111* (63); Sohail Tanvir 1/14 (4 overs)

Jamaica won by 7 wickets
National Cricket Stadium, St George's, Grenada
Umpires: Nigel Duguid and Patrick Gustard
Player of the match: Chris Gayle (Jamaica)

- St Lucia Zouks won the toss and elected to bat.

17 July
15:30 (D/N)
Scorecard

(H) Antigua Hawksbills; 96 (18.3 overs)	v	Jamaica Tallawahs; 97/2 (14.3 overs)
Sheldon Cottrell 21 (15); Andre Russell 2/16 (2 overs)		Chadwick Walton 43* (34); Carlos Brathwaite 2/11 (3 overs)

Jamaica won by 8 wickets
Sir Vivian Richards Stadium, North Sound, Antigua
Umpires: Joel Wilson and Gregory Brathwaite
Player of the match: Daniel Vettori (Jamaica)

- Antigua Hawksbills won the toss and elected to bat

17 July
19:30 (D/N)
Scorecard

Trinbago Knight Riders; 118/8 (20 overs)	v	Guyana Amazon Warriors (H); 118/9 (20 overs)
Evin Lewis 39 (51); Ronsford Beaton 2/15 (4 overs)		Christopher Barnwell 37 (40); Samuel Badree 3/18 (4 overs)

Match tied (Guyana Amazon Warriors won the one-over eliminator)
Providence Stadium, Guyana
Umpires: Nigel Duguid and Peter Nero
Player of the match: Christopher Barnwell (Guyana)

- Guyana Amazon Warriors won the toss and elected to field

19 July
12:00 (D/N)
Scorecard

(H) Antigua Hawksbills; 172/6 (20 overs)	v	Barbados Tridents; 173/5 (19.2 overs)
Marlon Samuels 84 (54); Ravi Rampaul 4/32 (4 overs)		Shoaib Malik 72 (50); Carlos Brathwaite 2/37 (4 overs)

Barbados won by 5 wickets
Sir Vivian Richards Stadium, North Sound, Antigua
Umpires: Leslie Reifer and Joel Wilson
Player of the match: Shoaib Malik (Barbados)

- Barbados Tridents won the toss and elected to field

19 July
16:00 (D/N)
Scorecard

St Lucia Stars; 117 (19.2 overs)	v	Guyana Amazon Warriors (H); 118/1 (16 overs)
Sohail Tanvir 32 (25); Krishmar Santokie 4/11 (3.2 overs)		Martin Guptill 50* (47); Darren Sammy 1/8 (2 overs)

Guyana won by 9 wickets
Providence Stadium, Guyana
Umpires: Patrick Gustard and Peter Nero
Player of the match: Krishmar Santokie (Guyana)

- Guyana Amazon Warriors won the toss and elected to field

20 July
12:00 (D/N)
Scorecard

(H) Antigua Hawksbills; 151/8 (20 overs)	v	Trinbago Knight Riders; 152/1 (17.1 overs)
Devon Thomas 38 (38); Kevon Cooper 3/34 (4 overs)		Kevin O'Brien 90* (49); Rahkeem Cornwall 1/38 (3 overs)

Trinbago won by 9 wickets
Sir Vivian Richards Stadium, North Sound, Antigua
Umpires: Gregory Brathwaite and Leslie Reifer
Player of the match: Kevin O'Brien (Trinidad and Tobago)

- Trinidad and Tobago Red steel won the toss and elected to field

20 July
16:00 (D/N)
Scorecard

Jamaica Tallawahs; 148/6 (20 overs)	v	Guyana Amazon Warriors (H); 144/2 (20 overs)
Chadwick Walton 53 (42); Ronsford Beaton 2/27 (4 overs)		Lendl Simmons 68 (61); Rusty Theron 1/24 (4 overs)

Jamaica won by 4 runs
Providence Stadium, Guyana
Umpires: Patrick Gustard and Peter Nero
Player of the match: Chadwick Walton (Jamaica)

- Guyana Amazon Warriors won the toss and elected to field

23 July
16:00 (D/N)
Scorecard

(H) Barbados Tridents; 186/2 (20 overs)	v	St Lucia Stars; 157/6 (20 overs)
Dwayne Smith 110* (69); Tino Best 1/27 (3 overs)		Keddy Lesporis 50* (38); Jeevan Mendis 1/16 (4 overs)

Barbados won by 29 runs
Kensington Oval, Bridgetown, Barbados
Umpires: Gregory Brathwaite and Joel Wilson
Player of the match: Dwayne Smith (Barbados)

- St Lucia Zouks won the toss and elected to field

24 July
20:00 (D/N)
Scorecard

Guyana Amazon Warriors; 179/5 (20 overs)	v	Trinbago Knight Riders (H); 180/6 (20 overs)
Denesh Ramdin 84 (45); Samuel Badree 3/13 (4 overs)		Darren Bravo 69* (49); Krishmar Santokie 3/36 (4 overs)

Trinbago won by 4 wickets
Queen's Park Oval, Port of Spain, Trinidad
Umpires: Nigel Duguid and Peter Nero
Player of the match: Darren Bravo (Trinidad and Tobago)

- Trinidad and Tobago Red Steel won the toss and elected to field

25 July
16:00 (D/N)
Scorecard

Antigua Hawksbills; 129/8 (20 overs)	v	Barbados Tridents (H); 130/9 (19.4 overs)
Marlon Samuels 66 (55); Ravi Rampaul 4/15 (4 overs)		Jonathan Carter 35 (34); Carlos Brathwaite 2/17 (4 overs)

Barbados won by 1 wicket
Kensington Oval, Bridgetown, Barbados
Umpires: Leslie Reifer and Joel Wilson
Player of the match: Ravi Rampaul (Barbados)

- Barbados Tridents won the toss and elected to field

26 July
12:00 (D/N)
Scorecard

(H) Trinbago Knight Riders; 183/5 (20 overs)	v	Jamaica Tallawahs; 170/6 (20 overs)
Evin Lewis 72 (43); Andre Russell 2/23 (4 overs)		Chris Gayle 60 (46); Kevin O'Brien 4/22 (3 overs)

Trinbago won by 13 runs
Queen's Park Oval, Port of Spain, Trinidad
Umpires: Patrick Gustard and Peter Nero
Player of the match: Kevin O'Brien (Trinidad and Tobago)

- Jamaica Tallawahs won the toss and elected to field

26 July
16:00 (D/N)
Scorecard

Guyana Amazon Warriors; 173/5 (20 overs)	v	Barbados Tridents (H); 166/4 (20 overs)
Lendl Simmons 64 (40); Jeevan Mendis 2/33 (4 overs)		Dwayne Smith 104 (67); Ronsford Beaton 1/27 (4 overs)

Guyana won by 7 runs
Kensington Oval, Bridgetown, Barbados
Umpires: Gregory Brathwaite and Leslie Reifer
Player of the match: Dwayne Smith (Barbados)

- Barbados Tridents won the toss and elected to field

27 July
16:00 (D/N)
Scorecard

St Lucia Stars; 136/9 (20 overs)	v	Trinbago Knight Riders (H); 137/1 (14.4 overs)
Darren Sammy* 46 (35); Samuel Badree 2/13 (4 overs)		Evin Lewis 77 (45); Shane Shillingford 1/26 (4 overs)

Trinbago won by 9 wickets
Queen's Park Oval, Port of Spain, Trinidad
Umpires: Nigel Duguid and Patrick Gustard
Player of the match: Evin Lewis (Trinidad and Tobago)

- St Lucia Zouks won the toss and elected to bat

31 July
14:00 (D/N)
Scorecard

Antigua Hawksbills; 89/9 (17 overs)	v	Jamaica Tallawahs (H); 91/3 (14 overs)
Carlos Brathwaite 24 (16); Jerome Taylor 4/18 (3 overs)		Chris Gayle 59* (36); Ben Laughlin 2/28 (3 overs)

Jamaica won by 7 wickets (D/L)
Sabina Park, Kingston, Jamaica
Umpires: Nigel Duguid and Peter Nero
Player of the match: Jerome Taylor (Jamaica)

- Jamaica Tallawahs won the toss and elected to field.

31 July
20:00 (D/N)
Scorecard

(H) St Lucia Stars; 167/7 (20 overs)	v	Barbados Tridents; 168/7 (19.4 overs)
Sohail Tanvir 50* (19); Kieron Pollard 2/30 (3 overs)		Jason Holder 48 (30); Ray Jordan 3/39 (4 overs)

Barbados won by 3 wickets
Beausejour Stadium, Gros Islet, St Lucia
Umpires: Gregory Brathwaite and Joel Wilson
Player of the match: Jason Holder (Barbados)

- St Lucia Zouks won the toss and elected to bat.

2 August
11:00 (D/N)
Scorecard

Guyana Amazon Warriors; 137/9 (20 overs)	v	Jamaica Tallawahs (H); 138/4 (20 overs)
Jimmy Neesham 35 (26); Jerome Taylor 3/14 (4 overs)		Andre Russell 58* (24); Mohammad Hafeez 2/13 (4 overs)

Jamaica won by 6 wickets
Sabina Park, Kingston, Jamaica
Umpires: Patrick Gustard and Peter Nero
Player of the match: Andre Russell (Jamaica)

- Jamaica Tallawahs won the toss and elected to field.

2 August
16:00 (D/N)
Scorecard

(H) St Lucia Stars; 117 (19.5 overs)	v	Trinbago Knight Riders; 119/2 (14.5 overs)
Andre Fletcher 24 (36); Shannon Gabriel 3/20 (4 overs)		Evin Lewis 59 (39); Ray Jordan 2/25 (3 overs)

Trinbago won by 8 wickets
Beausejour Stadium, Gros Islet, St Lucia
Umpires: Gregory Brathwaite and Joel Wilson
Player of the match: Shannon Gabriel (Trinidad and Tobago)

- Trinidad and Tobago Red Steel won the toss and elected to field.

3 August
11:00 (D/N)
Scorecard

(H) Jamaica Tallawahs; 147/8 (20 overs)	v	Barbados Tridents; 128/6 (20 overs)
Owais Shah 42 (36); Ravi Rampaul 4/18 (4 overs)		Shoaib Malik 81* (43); Jerome Taylor 2/11 (4 overs)

Jamaica won by 19 runs
Sabina Park, Kingston, Jamaica
Umpires: Nigel Duguid and Patrick Gustard
Player of the match: Jerome Taylor (Jamaica)

- Barbados Tridents won the toss and elected to field.

3 August
16:00 (D/N)
Scorecard

Antigua Hawksbills; 103/6 (16 overs)	v	St Lucia Stars (H); 108/5 (13.3 overs)
Danza Hyatt 26 (36); Sohail Tanvir 3/15 (4 overs)		Henry Davids 43 (35); Gavin Tonge 2/12 (2 overs)

St Lucia won by 5 wickets (D/L)
Beausejour Stadium, Gros Islet, St Lucia
Umpires: Gregory Brathwaite and Leslie Reifer
Player of the match: Sohail Tanvir (St Lucia)

- St Lucia Zouks won the toss and elected to field.

7 August
16:00 (D/N)
Scorecard

Guyana Amazon Warriors; 212/5 (20 overs)	v	Antigua Hawksbills; 193/3 (20 overs)
Martin Guptill 90 (51); Gavin Tonge 2/46 (4 overs)		Marlon Samuels 106* (52); Navin Stewart 1/25 (3 overs)

Guyana won by 19 runs
Warner Park, Basseterre, St Kitts
Umpires: Nigel Dugaid and Peter Nero
Player of the match: Martin Guptill

- Antigua Hawksbills won the toss and elected to field

7 August
20:00 (D/N)
Scorecard

Trinbago Knight Riders; 105 (16.5 overs)	v	Barbados Tridents; 174/5 (20 overs)
Nicholas Pooran 33 (23); Jason Holder 4/27 (4 overs)		Raymon Reifer 65 (41); Samuel Badree 2/20 (4 overs)

Barbados won by 69 runs
Warner Park, Basseterre, St Kitts
Umpires: Gregory Brathwaite and Joel Wilson
Player of the match: Jason Holder

- Trinidad and Tobago Red Steel won the toss and elected to field.

9 August
12:00 (D/N)
Scorecard

Trinbago Knight Riders; 113 (17.3 overs)	v	Antigua Hawksbills; 114/5 (18.3 overs)
Evin Lewis 38 (36); Ben Laughlin 3/7 (3 overs)		David Hussey 24 (27); Shannon Gabriel 2/16 (4 overs)

Antigua won by 5 wickets
Warner Park, Basseterre, St Kitts
Umpires: Leslie Reifer and Joel Wilson
Player of the match: Ben Laughlin (Antigua)

- Antigua Hawksbills won the toss and elected to field.

9 August
16:00 (D/N)
Scorecard

Jamaica Tallawahs; 143 (19.1 overs)	v	St Lucia Stars; 144/3 (17.3 overs)
Chadwick Walton 48 (33); Mervin Mathew 3/15 (3.1 overs)		Andre Fletcher 49 (35); Daniel Vettori 1/14 (4 overs)

St Lucia won by 7 wickets
Warner Park, Basseterre, St Kitts
Umpires: Patrick Gustard and Peter Nero
Player of the match: Mervin Mathew (St Lucia)

- St Lucia Zouks won the toss and elected to field.

10 August
12:00 (D/N)
Scorecard

Barbados Tridents; 175/8 (20 overs)	v	Jamaica Tallawahs; 87 (15.3 overs)
Kieron Pollard 63 (36); Rusty Theron 4/35 (4 overs)		Nkrumah Bonner 47 (40); Jeevan Mendis 2/15 (4 overs)

Barbados won by 88 runs
Warner Park, Basseterre, St Kitts
Umpires: Gregory Brathwaite and Leslie Reifer
Player of the match: Kieron Pollard (Barbados)

- Barbados Tridents won the toss and elected to bat.

10 August
16:00 (D/N)
Scorecard

St Lucia Stars; 189/7 (20 overs)	v	Guyana Amazon Warriors; 194/2 (19 overs)
Andre Fletcher 78 (49); Navin Stewart 3/22 (2 overs)		Lendl Simmons 97 (60); Tino Best 1/54 (4 overs)

Guyana won by 8 wickets
Warner Park, Basseterre, St Kitts
Umpires: Nigel Duguid and Patrick Gustard
Player of the match: Lendl Simmons (Guyana)

- Guyana Amazon Warriors won the toss and elected to field.

== Knockout stage ==
Semi-final 1
3	Trinbago Knight Riders	155/6 (20 overs)
4	Jamaica Tallawahs	158/6 (19.4 overs)

Semi-final 2
2	Guyana Amazon Warriors	138/0 (14.5 overs)
4	Jamaica Tallawahs	134/6 (20 overs)

The Final
1	Barbados Tridents	152/6 (20 overs) (D/L)
2	Guyana Amazon Warriors	107/4 (15.5 overs)

=== Fixtures ===
Semi-final 1
13 August 2014
16:00 (D/N)
Scorecard

Trinbago Knight Riders; 155/6 (20 overs)	v	Jamaica Tallawahs; 158/6 (19.4 overs)
Ross Taylor 70 (44); David Bernard 3/19 (4 overs)		Andre Russell 62* (27); Sulieman Benn 3/27 (4 overs)

Jamaica won by 4 wickets
Warner Park, Basseterre, St Kitts
Umpires: Gregory Brathwaite and Joel Wilson
Player of the match: Andre Russell (Jamaica)

- Jamaica Tallawahs won the toss and elected to field.

Semi-final 2
14 August 2014
16:00 (D/N)
Scorecard

Jamaica Tallawahs; 134/6 (20 overs)	v	Guyana Amazon Warriors; 138/0 (14.5 overs)
Chadwick Walton 34 (35); Sunil Narine 1/17 (4 overs)		Lendl Simmons 71* (43) –

Guyana won by 10 wickets
Warner Park, Basseterre, St Kitts
Umpires: Leslie Reifer and Joel Wilson
Player of the match: Lendl Simmons (AmWar)

- Guyana Amazon Warriors won the toss and elected to field.

The Final
16 August 2014
16:00 (D/N)
Scorecard

Barbados Tridents; 152/6 (20 overs)	v	Guyana Amazon Warriors; 107/4 (15.5 overs)
Dwayne Smith 59 (52); Krishmar Santokie 3/19 (4 overs)		Mohammad Hafeez 28 (27); Jason Holder 2/18 (4 overs)

Barbados won by 8 runs (DLS method)
Warner Park, Basseterre, St Kitts
Umpires: Gregory Brathwaite and Joel Wilson
Player of the match: Shoaib Malik (Barbados)

- Guyana Amazon Warriors won the toss and elected to field.

== Statistics ==
=== Most runs ===
Player	Team	Innings	Runs	High score
Lendl Simmons	Guyana Amazon Warriors	11	446	97
Shoaib Malik	Barbados Tridents	10	406	81 not out
Chris Gayle	Jamaica Tallawahs	11	363	111 not out
Martin Guptill	Guyana Amazon Warriors	10	358	90
Dwayne Smith	Barbados Tridents	10	353	110 not out

=== Most wickets ===
Player	Team	Innings	Wickets	Best bowling
Ravi Rampaul	Barbados Tridents	10	18	4/15
Krishmar Santokie	Guyana Amazon Warriors	11	17	4/11
Rusty Theron	Jamaica Tallawahs	11	14	4/35
Rayad Emrit	Barbados Tridents	10	12	3/23
Kevon Cooper	Trinidad and Tobago Red Steel	10	12	3/26
