= Orlando Peters =

Antiguan cricketer

Personal information
- Born: 10 May 1988 (age 38); Antigua
- Batting: Right-handed
- Bowling: Right-arm medium
- Role: All-rounder

Domestic team information
- Years: Team
- 2008–present: Leeward Islands
- 2013–2014: Antigua Hawksbills
- 2015: St Kitts and Nevis Patriots

Career statistics
Competition	FC	LA	T20
Matches	31	31	15
Runs scored	937	425	226
Batting average	15.61	15.74	22.60
100s/50s	1/3	0/1	0/1
Top score	104	77	67*
Balls bowled	1,272	444	72
Wickets	20	16	1
Bowling average	33.40	25.31	123.00
5 wickets in innings	0	1	0
10 wickets in match	0	0	0
Best bowling	4/44	5/49	1/26
Catches/stumpings	32/0	11/0	2/0
- Source: CricketArchive, 21 March 2019

Orlando Peters (born 10 May 1988) is an Antiguan cricketer who plays for the Leeward Islands in West Indian domestic cricket. He has also played for two Caribbean Premier League (CPL) franchises, the Antigua Hawksbills and the St Kitts and Nevis Patriots.

Peters made his first-class debut for the Leeward Islands in March 2008, during the 2007–08 Carib Beer Cup. The previous month, he had played for Antigua and Barbuda in the Stanford 20/20 tournament, appearing in the team's fixtures against the U.S. Virgin Islands and Guyana. Peters made sporadic appearances for the Leewards over the following seasons, without establishing himself in the side, and in 2013 signed with the Hawksbills franchise for the inaugural CPL season. During the 2014–15 Regional Four Day Competition, he scored a maiden first-class century, making 104 from 282 balls against the Windward Islands. Following the demise of the Hawksbills outfit prior to the 2015 CPL season, Peters switched to play for the new Patriots franchise.

In October 2019, he was named in the Leeward Islands' squad for the 2019–20 Regional Super50 tournament.
