= Samuel Badree =

Former West Indian cricketer

Personal information
- Full name: Samuel Badree
- Born: 9 March 1981 (age 45); Barrackpore, Trinidad and Tobago
- Batting: Right-handed
- Bowling: Right-arm leg spin
- Role: Bowler

International information
- National side: West Indies (2012-2018)
- T20I debut (cap 56): 30 June 2012 v New Zealand
- Last T20I: 5 August 2018 v Bangladesh
- T20I shirt no.: 77

Domestic team information
- Years: Team
- 2002–2013: Trinidad and Tobago
- 2013: Khulna Royal Bengals
- 2013: Rajasthan Royals
- 2013–2015: Trinidad and Tobago Red Steel
- 2014: Chennai Super Kings
- 2015/16–2016/17: Brisbane Heat
- 2016–2017: Islamabad United
- 2016–2017: St Kitts and Nevis Patriots
- 2017: Royal Challengers Bangalore
- 2017: Rangpur Riders
- 2018: Jamaica Tallawahs

Career statistics
Competition	T20I
Matches	52
Runs scored	43
Batting average	7.16
100s/50s	0/0
Top score	14*
Balls bowled	1,146
Wickets	56
Bowling average	21.07
5 wickets in innings	0
10 wickets in match	0
Best bowling	4/15
Catches/stumpings	7/–
Medal record
Men's Cricket
Representing West Indies
ICC Men's T20 World Cup
Winner	2012 Sri Lanka
Winner	2016 India
- Source: ESPNcricinfo, 11 August 2018

Samuel Badree (born 9 March 1981) is a Trinidadian cricket commentator, cricket coach, and former cricketer who played international cricket for the West Indies.

Badree made his first-class debut for Trinidad and Tobago in 2002, but played only sporadically at that level, instead concentrating on the limited-overs forms of the game. After good form at domestic level, he was selected to make his Twenty20 International debut for the West Indies in June 2012, against New Zealand. Badree was a member of the West Indies team that won both the 2012 T20 World Cup and the 2016 T20 World Cup, and was one of the highest wicket takers of the 2016 tournament.

Outside of his international appearances, he has also played in several domestic Twenty20 competitions, including the Caribbean Premier League, the Bangladesh Premier League, the Indian Premier League, the Pakistan Super League, and Australia's Big Bash League.

== Early life ==
Badree was born to a mixed Indo-Trinidadian family in Barrackpore, a town in Trinidad's Penal-Debe region. He attended San Fernando's Naparima College, and played cricket from a young age. Before playing cricket professionally, Badree worked as a secondary-school physical education teacher.

== Domestic career ==
Badree made his first-class debut for Trinidad and Tobago national cricket team in January 2002, aged 20, playing against the Leeward Islands in the 2001–02 Busta Cup. His List A debut came at the end of the same year, in the 2002–03 Red Stripe Bowl. Badree established himself in Trinidad and Tobago's limited-overs line-up a few seasons later, playing every match in the 2004–05 Regional One-Day Competition. He remained a fixture in the team for almost a decade, but retired after the 2012–13 Regional Super50 to concentrate on his Twenty20 career. At first-class level, Badree never played a full season, with his last matches for Trinidad and Tobago coming during the 2008–09 Regional Four Day Competition, aged 27. In 12 first-class appearances, he took only 14 wickets, and never more than two in an innings.

In 2006, Badree was a key member of the Trinidad and Tobago team that made the final of the inaugural Stanford 20/20 tournament. He took seven wickets in five matches (including 3/6 against the Cayman Islands), which was behind only Guyana's Narsingh Deonarine overall. Badree had less personal success in the 2008 edition of the tournament, but did take 1/12 from four overs in the final against Jamaica, which his team won. He subsequently represented the team in the 2008 Stanford Super Series, and later made appearances in the Champions League Twenty20 (established in 2009) and the Caribbean Twenty20 (established in 2010).

In 2013, Badree signed with the Red Steel franchise for the inaugural edition of the Caribbean Premier League (CPL). His seven matches yielded five wickets, and against the St Lucia Zouks he was named man of the match after taking 2/18 from four overs. Badree remained with the Red Steel for the 2014 season, and improved upon his performance from the previous season, taking 11 wickets from nine matches. This was the most of any spinner, and second only to Kevon Cooper for his team. Badree finished the 2015 CPL season with 12 wickets from 13 games, which was again the second-most for the Red Steel (behind Dwayne Bravo), and the equal third-most amongst spinners (behind Sunil Narine and Robin Peterson, and equal with Devendra Bishoo).

=== T20 franchise cricket ===
Badree first played for an overseas Twenty20 franchise in January 2013, when he played for the Khulna Royal Bengals in the 2013 Bangladesh Premier League (BPL) season. Later in the year, he signed with the Rajasthan Royals for the 2013 Indian Premier League (IPL), although he played only a single game (against the Delhi Daredevils). In the 2014 IPL auction, Badree was bought by the Chennai Super Kings for US$50,000. He went on to play four matches for the team during the 2014 season, but took only two wickets, with Ravichandran Ashwin and Ravi Jadeja being the preferred spin options. Later in 2014, Badree signed with the Brisbane Heat for the 2014–15 Big Bash League season in Australia. He was unable to play any matches due to a shoulder injury, but re-signed for the 2015–16 season. He struggled for form early in the season, going wicketless in his first three games, but eventually bounced back to finish as his team's leading wicket-taker, with nine wickets from eight matches. This included 5/22 in the final game of the season, against the Melbourne Stars.

On 14 April 2017 Badree played his first match for Royal Challengers Bangalore and picked a hat-trick in his second over against Mumbai Indians at M.Chinnaswamy stadium, Bangalore. He became the 15th bowler to do so in the Indian Premier League history. On the same day Andrew Tye of Gujarat Lions also took a hat-trick in the Indian Premier League. This was the first time in the IPL that two different bowlers took a hat-trick in two different matches on a single day.

In October 2018, he was named in Cape Town Blitz's squad for the first edition of the Mzansi Super League T20 tournament.

== International career ==
In November 2011, Badree played two Twenty20 matches for West Indies A against Bangladesh A, taking 2/11 in the first and 1/11 in the second. The following year, in June 2012, he also played for the team in a two-match Twenty20 series against India A. Badree made his full international debut at the end of that month, playing two Twenty20 International games against New Zealand. He was 31 years old at the time. Later in the year, Badree was selected in the West Indian squad for the 2012 World Twenty20. He finished the tournament, which the West Indies won, with four wickets in four games, including 1/24 in the final against Sri Lanka.

After the 2012 World Twenty20, Badree next played for the West Indies in March 2013, against the touring Zimbabweans. In the second game of the series, he took 3/17 from four overs, and was named man of the match. Later in 2013, Badree also appeared for the West Indies against Pakistan, while in early 2014 he played in series against New Zealand, Ireland, and England. In the 2014 World Twenty20 in Bangladesh, he took 11 wickets from just five games, which was the most for the West Indies and behind only Imran Tahir and Ahsan Malik overall. His tournament included figures of 4/15 against Bangladesh and 3/10 against Pakistan.

In April 2014, following the group stages of the World Twenty20, Badree moved to number one in the ICC Player Rankings for Twenty20 International bowlers, passing his teammate Sunil Narine. He was named in the 'Team of the Tournament' for the 2014 T20 World Cup by the ICC. He was selected in the 2nd XI of the 2014 ICC World T20 Cup by ESPNcricinfo.

Commentator Martin Crowe described him as "easily the best opening bowler in town", and praised his "gutsy and resilient display". although he has played only one subsequent series (against New Zealand in July 2014). He struggled with a shoulder injury throughout the second half of 2014, which eventually required surgery, and in 2015 contracted dengue fever, which forced him to miss a series against Sri Lanka.

He was named in the 'Team of the Tournament' for the 2016 T20 World Cup by the ICC, ESPNcricinfo and Cricbuzz.

In August 2017, he was named in a World XI side to play three Twenty20 International matches against Pakistan in the 2017 Independence Cup in Lahore.

== Coaching career ==
For the 2020 IPL, Badree was appointed as the spin bowling coach for Delhi Capitals.
