= 2013 Caribbean Premier League =

First season of the Caribbean Premier League

- Dates: 30 July 2013 – 24 August 2013
- Administrator: Caribbean Premier League
- Cricket format: Twenty20
- Tournament format(s): Group stage and knockout
- Champions: Jamaica Tallawahs (1st title)
- Runners-up: Guyana Amazon Warriors
- Participants: 6
- Matches: 24
- Attendance: 221,267 (9,219 per match)
- Player of the series: Krishmar Santokie (Guyana Amazon Warriors)
- Most runs: Shoaib Malik (Barbados Tridents) (272 runs)
- Most wickets: Krishmar Santokie (Guyana Amazon Warriors) (16 wickets)
- Official website: cplt20.com

The 2013 Caribbean Premier League or for sponsorship reasons, Limacol CPL 2013 was the inaugural season of the Caribbean Premier League, established by the West Indies Cricket Board. The tournament began on 30 July and ended on 24 August 2013.

== Format ==
The tournament has six teams and is divided into a group stage and a knockout stage. The group stage comprises 21 matches, with each team playing 7 matches. The knockout stage features two semi-finals and a final.

== Points table ==
Pos	Team	Pld	W	L	Pts	NRR	Qualification
1	Guyana Amazon Warriors	7	5	2	10	0.628	Advanced to the semi-finals
2	Jamaica Tallawahs	7	5	2	10	0.162	Advanced to the semi-finals
3	Barbados Tridents	7	4	3	8	1.069	Advanced to the semi-finals
4	Trinidad & Tobago Red Steel	7	3	4	6	−0.647	Advanced to the semi-finals
5	Antigua Hawksbills	7	2	5	4	−0.151	Eliminated
6	St Lucia Zouks	7	2	5	4	−1.190	Eliminated

Source: Cricinfo

== Group stage ==
30 July
20:00 (D/N)
Scorecard

Barbados Tridents (H); 169/5 (20 overs)	v	St Lucia Zouks; 152 (19.4 overs)
Shoaib Malik 78 (51); Darren Sammy 2/36 (4 overs)		Andre Fletcher 57 (41); Kieron Pollard 3/15 (2.4 overs)

Barbados won by 17 runs
Kensington Oval, Bridgetown, Barbados
Umpires: Billy Bowden and Gregory Brathwaite
Player of the match: Shoaib Malik

- Barbados Tridents won the toss and elected to bat.

31 July
20:00 (D/N)
Scorecard

Guyana Amazon Warriors (H); 155/5 (20 overs)	v	Trinbago Knight Riders; 136/9 (20 overs)
Lendl Simmons 42 (50); Dwayne Bravo 2/41 (4 overs)		Nicholas Pooran 54 (24); Veerasammy Permaul 3/32 (4 overs)

Guyana won by 19 runs
Providence Stadium, Guyana
Umpires: Peter Nero and Joel Wilson
Player of the match: Krishmar Santokie

- Trinidad and Tobago Red Steel won the toss and elected to field.

1 August
20:00 (D/N)
Scorecard

(H) Barbados Tridents; 146/8 (20 overs)	v	Antigua Hawksbills; 134/8 (20 overs)
Shoaib Malik 33 (30); Marlon Samuels 2/17 (4 overs)		Johnson Charles 44 (37); Ashley Nurse 4/28 (3 overs)

Barbados won by 12 runs
Kensington Oval, Bridgetown, Barbados
Umpires: Billy Bowden and Leslie Reifer
Player of the match: Shakib Al Hasan

- Barbados Tridents won the toss and elected to bat.

2 August
20:00 (D/N)
Scorecard

Jamaica Tallawahs; 117 (19.1 overs)	v	Guyana Amazon Warriors (H); 118/2 (14.3 overs)
Carlton Baugh 32 (30); Krishmar Santokie 3/20 (3.1 overs)		Lendl Simmons 67* (44); Muttiah Muralitharan 2/33 (4 overs)

Guyana won by 8 wickets
Providence Stadium, Guyana
Umpires: Peter Nero and Joel Wilson
Player of the match: Lendl Simmons

- Guyana Amazon Warriors won the toss and elected to field.

3 August
20:00 (D/N)
Scorecard

Trinbago Knight Riders; 52 (12.5 overs)	v	Barbados Tridents (H); 53/6 (8 overs)
Davy Jacobs 13 (12); Shakib Al Hasan 6/6 (4 overs)		Jonathan Carter 14 (6); Fidel Edwards 5/22 (4 overs)

Barbados won by 4 wickets
Kensington Oval, Bridgetown, Barbados
Umpires: Billy Bowden and Gregory Brathwaite
Player of the match: Shakib Al Hasan

- Trinidad and Tobago Red Steel won the toss and elected to bat.

4 August
15:00
Scorecard

Antigua Hawksbills; 117/7 (20 overs)	v	Jamaica Tallawahs; 120/3 (16.5 overs)
Kieran Powell 38 (35); Vernon Philander 3/16 (4 overs)		Andre Russell 42* (23); Rahkeem Cornwall 1/6 (1 over)

Jamaica won by 7 wickets
Providence Stadium, Guyana
Umpires: Colin Alfred and Nigel Duguid
Player of the match: Vernon Philander

- Antigua Hawksbills won the toss and elected to bat.

4 August
20:00 (D/N)
Scorecard

(H) Guyana Amazon Warriors; 126/6 (20 overs)	v	St Lucia Zouks; 129/5 (19.3 overs)
Lendl Simmons 38 (42); Shane Shillingford 3/23 (4 overs)		Misbah-ul-Haq 49* (33); Veerasammy Permaul 1/13 (4 overs)

St Lucia won by 5 wickets
Providence Stadium, Guyana
Umpires: Peter Nero and Joel Wilson
Player of the match: Misbah-ul-Haq

- St Lucia Zouks won the toss and elected to field.

6 August
20:00 (D/N)
Scorecard

Antigua Hawksbills; 166/6 (20 overs)	v	St Lucia Zouks (H); 133/8 (20 overs)
Johnson Charles 36 (30); Albie Morkel 2/27 (4 overs)		Tamim Iqbal 33 (39); Marlon Samuels 3/10 (4 overs)

Antigua won by 33 runs
Beausejour Stadium, Gros Islet, St Lucia
Umpires: Gregory Brathwaite and Nigel Duguid
Player of the match: Devon Thomas

- St Lucia Zouks won the toss and elected to field.

7 August
20:00 (D/N)
Scorecard

Jamaica Tallawahs; 146/6 (20 overs)	v	Trinbago Knight Riders (H); 141/5 (20 overs)
Danza Hyatt 42* (26); Samuel Badree 1/7 (2 overs)		Adrian Barath 32 (36); Andre Russell 2/27 (3 overs)

Jamaica won by 5 runs
Queen's Park Oval, Port of Spain, Trinidad
Umpires: Patrick Gustard and Peter Nero
Player of the match: Danza Hyatt

- Trinidad and Tobago Red Steel won the toss and elected to field.

8 August
20:00 (D/N)
Scorecard

Barbados Tridents; 175/6 (20 overs)	v	St Lucia Zouks (H); 92 (17.5 overs)
Dwayne Smith 48 (38); Albie Morkel 2/26 (4 overs)		Misbah-ul-Haq 23 (20); Ashley Nurse 3/12 (2.5 overs)

Barbados won by 83 runs
Beausejour Stadium, Gros Islet, St Lucia
Umpires: Billy Bowden and Nigel Duguid
Player of the match: Kieron Pollard

- Barbados Tridents won the toss and elected to bat.

9 August
20:00 (D/N)
Scorecard

(H) Trinbago Knight Riders; 159/4 (20 overs)	v	Guyana Amazon Warriors; 156/4 (20 overs)
Kevin O'Brien 70 (47); Krishmar Santokie 2/25 (4 overs)		James Franklin 60* (34); Dwayne Bravo 2/21 (4 overs)

Trinbago won by 3 runs
Queen's Park Oval, Port of Spain, Trinidad
Umpires: Peter Nero and Joel Wilson
Player of the match: Kevin O'Brien

- Trinidad and Tobago Red Steel won the toss and elected to bat.

10 August
20:00 (D/N)
Scorecard

(H) St Lucia Zouks; 142/7 (20 overs)	v	Jamaica Tallawahs; 146/4 (17.3 overs)
Tamim Iqbal 75 (62); Vernon Philander 2/31 (4 overs)		Andre Russell 47* (19); Garey Mathurin 1/11 (4 overs)

Jamaica won by 6 wickets
Beausejour Stadium, Gros Islet, St Lucia
Umpires: Gregory Brathwaite and Nigel Duguid
Player of the match: Andre Russell

- St Lucia Zouks won the toss and elected to bat.

11 August
15:00
Scorecard

Guyana Amazon Warriors; 149/9 (20 overs)	v	Barbados Tridents; 122 (19.4 overs)
Martin Guptill 73 (55); Rayad Emrit 3/27 (4 overs)		Shoaib Malik 48 (47); Mohammad Hafeez 3/19 (4 overs)

Guyana won by 27 runs
Queen's Park Oval, Port of Spain, Trinidad
Umpires: Danesh Ramdhanie and Joel Wilson
Player of the match: Martin Guptill

- Guyana Amazon Warriors won the toss and elected to bat.

11 August
20:00 (D/N)
Scorecard

(H) Trinbago Knight Riders; 169/6 (20 overs)	v	Antigua Hawksbills; 132/8 (15 overs)
Dwayne Bravo 46 (25); Kemar Roach 2/27 (4 overs)		Johnson Charles 46 (28); Dwayne Bravo 2/14 (3 overs)

Trinbago won by 1 run (D/L)
Queen's Park Oval, Port of Spain, Trinidad
Umpires: Patrick Gustard and Peter Nero
Player of the match: Dwayne Bravo

- Trinidad and Tobago Red Steel won the toss and elected to bat.
- Rain revised the Antigua Hawksbills' target to 134 runs from 15 overs according to the Duckworth–Lewis method.

13 August
20:00 (D/N)
Scorecard

Barbados Tridents; 97/9 (20 overs)	v	Antigua Hawksbills (H); 98/5 (19 overs)
Raymon Reifer 30 (42); Sheldon Cotterrell 4/20 (4 overs)		Orlando Peters 31 (22); Shoaib Malik 1/3 (4 overs)

Antigua won by 5 wickets
Sir Vivian Richards Stadium, North Sound, Antigua
Umpires: Billy Bowden and Joel Wilson
Player of the match: Sheldon Cotterrell

- Barbados Tridents won the toss and elected to bat.

15 August
14:00 (D/N)
Scorecard

Guyana Amazon Warriors; 139/6 (20 overs)	v	Jamaica Tallawahs (H); 134/8 (20 overs)
James Franklin 40 (29); Vernon Philander 2/23 (4 overs)		Chris Gayle 43 (46); Christopher Barnwell 2/4 (1 over)

Guyana won by 5 runs
Sabina Park, Kingston, Jamaica
Umpires: Patrick Gustard and Peter Nero
Player of the match: Sunil Narine

- Jamaica Tallawahs won the toss and elected to field.

15 August
20:00 (D/N)
Scorecard

St Lucia Zouks; 179/4 (20 overs)	v	Antigua Hawksbills (H); 76/3 (10.4 overs)
Andre Fletcher 76 (53); Marlon Samuels 2/33 (4 overs)		Jahmar Hamilton 24 (30); Garey Mathurin 2/26 (3 overs)

St Lucia won by 17 runs (D/L)
Sir Vivian Richards Stadium, North Sound, Antigua
Umpires: Billy Bowden and Carl Tuckett
Player of the match: Andre Fletcher

- St Lucia Zouks won the toss and elected to bat.
- Rain stopped play during the Antigua Hawksbills' innings. Their par score after 10.4 overs was 93 runs according to the Duckworth–Lewis method.

17 August
10:00 (D/N)
Scorecard

St Lucia Zouks; 99/5 (20 overs)	v	Trinbago Knight Riders; 105/4 (17.5 overs)
Andre Fletcher 46* (59); Samuel Badree 2/18 (4 overs)		Kevin O'Brien 37 (33); Garey Mathurin 2/24 (4 overs)

Trinbago won by 6 wickets
Sabina Park, Kingston, Jamaica
Umpires: Patrick Gustard and Verdayne Smith
Player of the match: Samuel Badree

- Trinidad and Tobago Red Steel won the toss and elected to field.

17 August
14:00 (D/N)
Scorecard

Barbados Tridents; 113/4 (20 overs)	v	Jamaica Tallawahs (H); 114/4 (18.1 overs)
Dwayne Smith 52* (53); Muttiah Muralitharan 3/12 (4 overs)		Ahmed Shehzad 28 (25); Shoaib Malik 1/19 (3 overs)

Jamaica won by 6 wickets
Sabina Park, Kingston, Jamaica
Umpires: Gregory Brathwaite and Christopher Taylor
Player of the match: Muttiah Muralitharan

- Jamaica Tallawahs won the toss and elected to field.

17 August
20:00 (D/N)
Scorecard

(H) Antigua Hawksbills; 166/6 (20 overs)	v	Guyana Amazon Warriors; 170/5 (20 overs)
Kieran Powell 47 (45); Krishmar Santokie 3/19 (4 overs)		Mohammad Hafeez 50* (23); Gavin Tonge 3/24 (4 overs)

Guyana won by 5 wickets
Sir Vivian Richards Stadium, North Sound, Antigua
Umpires: Carl Tuckett and Joel Wilson
Player of the match: Mohammad Hafeez

- Antigua Hawksbills won the toss and elected to bat.

18 August
14:00 (D/N)
Scorecard

Trinbago Knight Riders; 133/8 (20 overs)	v	Jamaica Tallawahs (H); 134/7 (20 overs)
Dwayne Bravo 29 (16); Chris Gayle 2/24 (4 overs)		Chris Gayle 51 (25); Kevon Cooper 2/14 (4 overs)

Jamaica won by 3 wickets
Sabina Park, Kingston, Jamaica
Umpires: Gregory Brathwaite and Patrick Gustard
Player of the match: Chris Gayle

- Jamaica Tallawahs won the toss and elected to field.

== Knockout stage ==
=== Brackets ===
Semi-finals
1	Guyana Amazon Warriors	107/3 (16.2 overs)
4	Trinidad & Tobago Red Steel (H)	103 (19.3 overs)
2	Jamaica Tallawahs	152/3 (18.3 overs)
3	Barbados Tridents	148/6 (20 overs)

Final
SFW1	Guyana Amazon Warriors	128/5 (20 overs)
SFW2	Jamaica Tallawahs	129/3 (17.3 overs)

=== Semi-finals ===
Semi-final 1
22 August
20:00 (D/N)
Scorecard

Trinidad & Tobago Red Steel (H); 103 (19.3 overs)	v	Guyana Amazon Warriors; 107/3 (16.2 overs)
Kevon Cooper 27 (17); Tillakaratne Dilshan 2/14 (4 overs)		Tillakaratne Dilshan 39 (29); Kevon Cooper 1/18 (3.2 overs)

Guyana won by 7 wickets
Queen's Park Oval, Port of Spain, Trinidad
Umpires: Billy Bowden and Joel Wilson
Player of the match: Tillakaratne Dilshan

- Guyana Amazon Warriors won the toss and elected to field.

Semi-final 2
23 August
20:00 (D/N)
Scorecard

Barbados Tridents; 148/6 (20 overs)	v	Jamaica Tallawahs; 152/3 (18.3 overs)
Shoaib Malik 49 (47); Vernon Philander 2/28 (4 overs)		Kumar Sangakkara 50* (38); Azhar Mahmood 2/37 (3.3 overs)

Jamaica won by 7 wickets
Queen's Park Oval, Port of Spain, Trinidad
Umpires: Nigel Duguid and Joel Wilson
Player of the match: Kumar Sangakkara

- Jamaica Tallawahs won the toss and elected to field.

=== Final ===
The Final
24 August
20:00 (D/N)
Scorecard

Guyana Amazon Warriors; 128/5 (20 overs)	v	Jamaica Tallawahs; 129/3 (17.3 overs)
Lendl Simmons 40 (44); David Bernard 2/18 (4 overs)		Chris Gayle 47* (48); Christopher Barnwell 1/26 (2 overs)

Jamaica won by 7 wickets
Queen's Park Oval, Port of Spain, Trinidad
Umpires: Billy Bowden and Nigel Duguid
Player of the match: Chris Gayle

- Jamaica Tallawahs won the toss and elected to field.

== Statistics ==
=== Most runs ===
Player	Team	Innings	Runs	High score
Shoaib Malik	Barbados Tridents	8	272	78
Lendl Simmons	Guyana Amazon Warriors	9	266	67*
Andre Fletcher	St Lucia Stars	7	238	76
Chris Gayle	Jamaica Tallawahs	9	234	51
James Franklin	Guyana Amazon Warriors	8	203	60*

=== Most wickets ===
Player	Team	Innings	Wickets	Best bowling
Krishmar Santokie	Guyana Amazon Warriors	9	16	3/19
Shakib Al Hasan	Barbados Tridents	8	11	6/6
Marlon Samuels	Antigua Hawksbills	7	10	3/10
Ashley Nurse	Barbados Tridents	7	10	4/28
Rayad Emrit	Barbados Tridents	8	10	3/19
