= Evin Lewis =

Trinidadian cricketer (born 1991)

Personal information
- Full name: Evin Earl Lewis
- Born: 27 December 1991 (age 34); Rio Claro, Trinidad and Tobago
- Batting: Left-handed
- Bowling: Right-arm medium
- Role: Opening batter

International information
- National side: West Indies (2016–present)
- ODI debut (cap 174): 5 October 2016 v Pakistan
- Last ODI: 3 June 2025 v England
- ODI shirt no.: 17
- T20I debut (cap 63): 27 March 2016 v Afghanistan
- Last T20I: 15 June 2025 v Ireland
- T20I shirt no.: 17

Domestic team information
- Years: Team
- 2012–present: Trinidad and Tobago
- 2014: T&T Red Steel
- 2015–present: St Kitts and Nevis Patriots
- 2015: Barisal Bulls
- 2016–2017: Dhaka Dynamites
- 2018: Peshawar Zalmi
- 2018–2019: Mumbai Indians
- 2018-present: Comilla Victorians
- 2021: Rajasthan Royals
- 2022: Lucknow Super Giants
- 2024: Khulna Tigers

Career statistics
Competition	ODI	T20I	FC	LA
Matches	67	65	22	111
Runs scored	2,175	1,782	1,229	3,587
Batting average	36.86	29.70	30.72	36.23
100s/50s	5/11	2/13	1/8	8/20
Top score	176*	125*	104	176*
Catches/stumpings	27/–	17/–	18/–	55/–
Medal record
Men's Cricket
Representing West Indies
ICC Men's T20 World Cup
Winner	2016 India
- Source: ESPNcricinfo, 15 June 2025

Evin Earl Lewis (born 27 December 1991) is a Trinidadian cricketer who plays for the West Indies as a left-handed opening batsman in limited-overs internationals. Lewis is the third batsman, after Brendon McCullum and Chris Gayle, to score two Twenty20 International centuries. Lewis also holds the records of the highest retired hurt score, of 176 not out, in international cricket along with the highest score, of 125 not out, by a West Indian in T20 internationals. Lewis was a member of the West Indies team that won the 2016 T20 World Cup.

He won the 2019 Bangladesh Premier League title with the Comilla Victorians, the 2021 Caribbean Premier League title with the St Kitts & Nevis Patriots. Lewis has also featured for CPL team Trinidad and Tobago Red Steel, BPL outfits Barisal Bulls and Dhaka Dynamites along with IPL sides Mumbai Indians and Rajasthan Royals.

== Early career ==
Evin Lewis was born in Rio Claro, Trinidad. He represented the West Indies under-19s at the 2010 Under-19 World Cup in New Zealand, playing three matches. He had earlier represented Trinidad and Tobago at the 2009–10 WICB President's Cup, the domestic limited-overs competition.

== Domestic and T20 franchise career ==
Lewis made his first-class debut for Trinidad and Tobago in March 2012, in the 2011–12 Regional Four Day Competition. Later in the year, he represented the team in the 2012 Champions League Twenty20 in South Africa, playing a single match (against Sri Lankan team Uva Next).

At the 2013 Champions League Twenty20 in India, Lewis scored 211 runs from five innings, finished as his team's leading run-scorer (and fifth overall). His tournament included scores of 70 from 35 balls against the Titans (a South African team) and 62 from 46 balls in the semi-final against the Mumbai Indians. For the 2014 Caribbean Premier League, Lewis signed with the Trinidad and Tobago Red Steel franchise, and scored 321 runs from eight innings (the most for his team, and seventh overall). He switched to the new St Kitts and Nevis Patriots franchise for the 2015 edition, and scored the third-most runs for his team (behind Marlon Samuels and Martin Guptill). Later in 2015, Lewis signed with the Barisal Bulls franchise for the inaugural season of the Bangladesh Premier League. In one match against the Dhaka Dynamites, he scored 101 not out from 65 balls, the tournament's only century. Lewis later represented Dhaka Dynamites in the competition, scoring another century in his short stint in the 2016 edition.

In the 2017 Caribbean Premier League, he opened the batting with his mentor Chris Gayle for an entire season at the St. Kitts and Nevis Patriots, a team which also included West Indies T20 captain Carlos Brathwaite.

He was selected to play for the Vancouver Knights in the players' draft for the inaugural 2018 edition of the Global T20 Canada tournament.

He was named in the squad for the Comilla Victorians team following the draft for the 2018–19 Bangladesh Premier League. With Lewis in tow the Comilla Victorians went on to defeat the Dhaka Dynamites by 17 runs to claim the 2019 BPL title. During the 2019 Caribbean Premier League, Lewis was fined for an incident in the match between the Trinbago Knight Riders and St Kitts & Nevis Patriots, where he was involved in a heated exchange with bowler Ali Khan.

He was released by the Mumbai Indians ahead of the 2020 IPL auction. In July 2020, he was once again named in the St Kitts & Nevis Patriots squad for the 2020 Caribbean Premier League. Lewis eventually signed up with the Rajasthan Royals for the second half of the 2021 Indian Premier League. He also scored a century against the Trinbago Knight Riders to propel the St Kitts and Nevis Patriots toward the 2021 Caribbean Premier League semifinals. The Patriots together with Lewis went on to win their first CPL title, in defeating the St Lucia Kings by 3 wickets in the final.

In February 2022, he was bought by the Lucknow Super Giants in the auction for the 2022 Indian Premier League tournament. He played a Quick-fire knock of 55*(23) against Defending Champions Chennai Super Kings in chase of 210 to hand Lucknow Super Giants their first ever win in Indian Premier League.

In July 2022, he was signed by the Jaffna Kings for the third edition of the Lanka Premier League.

== International career ==
In March 2016, Lewis was added to the West Indies squad for the 2016 ICC World Twenty20, replacing the injured Lendl Simmons. He made his Twenty20 International (T20I) debut on 27 March 2016 against Afghanistan at Nagpur

On 27 August 2016, in only his 2nd T20I, Lewis scored his debut T20I century against India in the first match of the series between the two sides at the Central Broward Regional Park Stadium, Lauderhill, Florida. His 100 came off 48 delivery, being the second fastest T20I century by a West Indian, after Gayle, and sixth fastest overall. During Lewis' innings, he hit five sixes in five balls from an over bowled by Stuart Binny. He didn't manage a six from the final ball, but still managed 32 runs (1 run made by a wide) from the over. The West Indies scored a sum of 245 runs and later won the game, which set a new record for the most sixes in a T20I, by just one run. Along with that Lewis was awarded the man-of-the-match.

He made his One Day International (ODI) debut for the West Indies against Pakistan on 5 October 2016. In November 2016 he scored his maiden ODI century of 148, with 15 fours and 4 sixes, against Sri Lanka at Harare Sports Club in the 2016–17 Zimbabwe Tri-Series. Despite Lewis's heroics with the bat, the Caribbean side were just narrowly defeated in this encounter.

He made his second T20I hundred on 9 July 2017 against India at Sabina Park. He smashed 125*, which is the highest score in a T20I chase, also becoming the third batsman to score two international T20 tons, after Brendon McCullum and Chris Gayle. Lewis' knock is also the highest T20I score by a West Indian batsman.

On 27 September 2017, Lewis notched 176 not out in the 4th ODI vs England at The Oval. This was the highest score by any batsman who opted to retire hurt in international cricket. As well his 176* was the 4th highest score by a west Indian in one day internationals along with the third highest by any batsman against England. Despite his runs coming in a losing cause, Lewis was adjudged as the man of the match for this encounter.

In February 2018, the International Cricket Council (ICC) named Lewis as one of the ten players to watch ahead of the 2018 Cricket World Cup Qualifier tournament. In June 2018, he was named the T20 International Cricketer of the Year at the annual Cricket West Indies' Awards.

In April 2019, he was named in the West Indies' squad for the 2019 Cricket World Cup. In June 2021, during the series against South Africa, Lewis scored his 1,000th run in T20I cricket. In September 2021, Lewis was named in the West Indies' squad for the 2021 ICC Men's T20 World Cup.
