= Carlos Brathwaite =

Barbadian cricketer (born 1988)

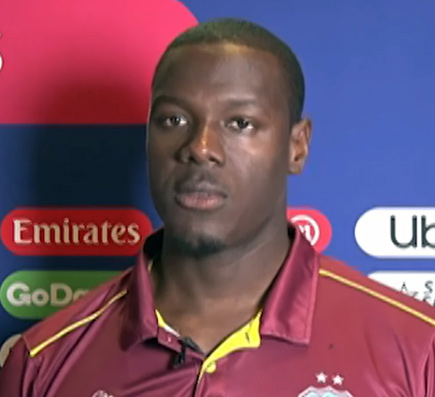
- Carlos Brathwaite in 2019

Personal information
- Full name: Carlos Ricardo Brathwaite
- Born: 18 July 1988 (age 38); Christ Church, Barbados
- Nickname: Ricky
- Batting: Right-handed
- Bowling: Right-arm fast-medium
- Role: All-rounder

International information
- National side: West Indies (2011–2019)
- Test debut (cap 306): 26 December 2015 v Australia
- Last Test: 21 July 2016 v India
- ODI debut (cap 161): 18 October 2011 v Bangladesh
- Last ODI: 14 August 2019 v India
- T20I debut (cap 53): 11 October 2011 v Bangladesh
- Last T20I: 6 August 2019 v India

Domestic team information
- Years: Team
- 2010/11–present: Barbados
- 2010/11, 2018/19–2019/20: Combined Campuses and Colleges
- 2013: Barbados Tridents
- 2014: Antigua Hawksbills
- 2015–2019: St Kitts and Nevis Patriots
- 2016–2017: Delhi Capitals
- 2016/17: Sydney Thunder
- 2017–2019: Khulna Titans
- 2017/18, 2020/21: Sydney Sixers
- 2018: Sunrisers Hyderabad, Kent
- 2019, 2024: Lahore Qalandars
- 2019: Kolkata Knight Riders
- 2020: Peshawar Zalmi
- 2020–present: Jamaica Tallawahs
- 2021: Manchester Originals
- 2021: Warwickshire
- 2021–2022: Multan Sultans

Career statistics
Competition	Test	ODI	T20I	FC
Matches	3	44	41	39
Runs scored	181	559	310	1,522
Batting average	45.25	16.44	14.76	27.67
100s/50s	0/3	1/1	0/0	1/9
Top score	69	101	37*	109
Balls bowled	408	1,825	709	4,472
Wickets	1	43	31	88
Bowling average	242.00	41.06	32.67	23.84
5 wickets in innings	0	1	0	2
10 wickets in match	0	0	0	0
Best bowling	1/30	5/27	3/20	7/90
Catches/stumpings	0/–	11/–	19/–	20/–
Medal record
Men's Cricket
Representing West Indies
ICC Men's T20 World Cup
Winner	2016 India
- Source: ESPNcricinfo, 6 November 2021

Carlos Ricardo Brathwaite (born 18 July 1988) is a Barbadian cricket commentator and former cricketer. He briefly captained the West Indies in Twenty20 International (T20I). He was a key member of the West Indies team that won the 2016 T20 World Cup and is known for scoring 19 runs off the final over against England in the 2016 ICC World Twenty20 Final, ending with 34 runs off 10 balls.

== Domestic and T20 franchise career ==
In April 2016, he made his Indian Premier League (IPL) debut for Delhi Daredevils. He spent a number of years playing domestic cricket in Ireland, with Dublin-based Leinster Cricket Club, and in 2009 he won the Bob Kerr Irish Senior Cup, defeating Donemena CC in the final.

In January 2018, he was bought by Sunrisers Hyderabad in the 2018 IPL auction and in May was signed by Kent County Cricket Club to play in the 2018 Vitality Blast tournament in England.

In October 2018, Cricket West Indies (CWI) awarded him a white-ball contract for the 2018–19 season. Later the same month, he was named in the squad for Khulna Titans following the draft for the 2018–19 Bangladesh Premier League and in October captained Combined Campuses and Colleges to their first Regional Super 50 title. In December 2018, he was bought by Kolkata Knight Riders for the 2019 Indian Premier League.

In October 2019, Brathwaite was again named as captain of Combined Campuses for the 2019–20 Regional Super50 tournament. In July 2020, he was named in the Jamaica Tallawahs squad for the 2020 Caribbean Premier League and in October was drafted by the Dambulla Viiking for the inaugural edition of the Lanka Premier League.

Brathwaite signed for Birmingham Bears for the 2021 T20 Blast and in July 2022 was signed by the Kandy Falcons for the 2022 Lanka Premier League.

== International career ==
Brathwaite made his T20I debut for the West Indies against Bangladesh on 11 October 2011. He made his One Day International debut seven days later in the same series.

He made his Test debut for the West Indies in the Second Test against Australia at the Melbourne Cricket Ground on 26 December 2015.

Needing 19 to win in the last over of the 2016 ICC World Twenty20 final against England, Brathwaite hit four consecutive sixes in the first four balls of the over to enable the West Indies to win their second World Twenty20 title. This was his debut World Cup. He was the first player for the West Indies to hit four consecutive sixes in a T20I match.

In August 2016, Brathwaite was named the captain of the West Indies team for their Twenty20 International matches against India in Florida later that month.

On 8 March 2018, during the 2018 Cricket World Cup Qualifier match against Papua New Guinea at the Old Hararians in Harare, Brathwaite took his first five-wicket haul in ODIs.

In April 2019, he was named in the West Indies' squad for the 2019 Cricket World Cup. On 22 June 2019, Brathwaite scored his first century in ODIs in a match against New Zealand. He was caught on the boundary for what would have been a match-winning six.

== Personal life ==
Carlos Brathwaite married his longtime girlfriend Jessica Felix in June 2018. The couple have a daughter. Brathwaite is a supporter of the english football club Manchester United. He grew up idolising Cristiano Ronaldo.
