= Navin Stewart =

Tobagonian cricketer (born 1983)

Personal information
- Full name: Navin Derrick Stewart
- Born: 13 June 1983 (age 43); Roxborough, Tobago
- Batting: Right-handed
- Bowling: Right-arm fast-medium
- Role: Bowler

Domestic team information
- Years: Team
- 2008/09-2013/14: Trinidad & Tobago
- 2014: Guyana Amazon Warriors
- 2015–2016: Barbados Tridents
- Source: CricketArchive, 3 May 2016

Navin Derrick Stewart (born 13 June 1983) is a Tobagonian first-class cricketer, who plays for Trinidad and Tobago national cricket team. He also played for Guyana Amazon Warriors in 2014, and for Barbados Tridents in the 2015 Caribbean Premier League. In June 2021, he was selected to take part in the Minor League Cricket tournament in the United States following the players' draft.
