= Trinbago Knight Riders =

CPL franchise based in Trinidad and Tobago

- Trinidad and Tobago Red Steel (2013–2015)
- Official logo of the Trinbago Knight Riders
- Nickname: Knights
- League: Caribbean Premier League

Personnel
- Captain: Nicholas Pooran
- Coach: Dwayne Bravo
- Owner: Knight Riders Group
- Chief executive: Rajeev Singh; Lloyd Rangiah

Team information
- City: Port of Spain, Trinidad and Tobago
- Colours: Red; Black; Purple; Gold
- Founded: 2013; 13 years ago
- Home ground: Queen's Park Oval and Brian Lara Cricket Academy
- Capacity: 20,000

History
- CPL wins: 5 (2015, 2017, 2018, 2020, 2025)
- 6ixty wins: 0
- Official website: www.tkriders.com
T20I kit

Knight Riders Group

Current Teams
- Kolkata Knight Riders (2008–present) 🏆×3 (2012, 2014, 2024); Trinbago Knight Riders (2015–present) 🏆×5 (2015, 2017, 2018, 2020, 2025); Trinbago Knight Riders Women (2022–present) 🏆×1 (2022); Abu Dhabi Knight Riders (2023–present); Los Angeles Knight Riders (2023–present) 🏆×1 (2026)

Stadium
- Knight Riders Cricket Ground (2026–present)

Defunct Teams
- Cape Town Knight Riders (2017)

The Trinbago Knight Riders (formerly the Trinidad and Tobago Red Steel) are a professional Twenty20 cricket team based in the Port of Spain, Trinidad and Tobago that competes in the Caribbean Premier League, a franchise-based cricket league since 2013. Their home ground is Queen's Park Oval. They are the most successful team in CPL history, winning five titles in 2015, 2017, 2018, 2020 and 2025 respectively.

The Red Steel are among the original six teams established for the tournament's inaugural edition. In 2015, Knight Riders Group, the parent company of Indian Premier League team Kolkata Knight Riders, purchased the majority stake in the Red Steel. The Red Steel went on to win the 2015 tournament. After the victorious season, the franchise name was renamed to Trinbago Knight Riders in 2016, to promote the brand legacy of the Knight Riders overseas. The franchise is owned by the Knight Riders Group, a sporting subsidiary alliance between the Red Chillies Entertainment and the Mehta Group, which also owns the Women's team that plays in the Women's Caribbean Premier League.

The side's all-time leading run-scorer is Colin Munro, while their leading wicket-taker is Dwayne Bravo, who is now serving as the head-coach of the team since the 2025 edition.

On 28 August 2026, Trinbago Knight Riders defeated Barbados Tridents by seven wickets at Queen's Park Oval during the 2026 Caribbean Premier League. Barbados Tridents scored 127/9, while Trinbago Knight Riders reached 128/3 in the 15th over.

== Franchise history ==
The Trinidad & Tobago Red Steel were one of the six teams created for the Caribbean Premier League's inaugural 2013 season. In 2015, Red Chillies Entertainment, led by Bollywood actor Shah Rukh Khan and Mehta Group of businessman Jay Mehta and his wife Juhi Chawla, purchased stake in the Red Steel. They went on to win the 2015 tournament to earn their first title, defeating the Barbados Tridents by 20 runs at Queen's Park Oval.

Red Chillies Entertainment also owns the Indian Premier League's Kolkata Knight Riders; this was the first time an IPL team had invested in a Twenty20 cricket league outside India. In 2016, Red Chillies Entertainment took over the team's entire operations and changed the name to the Knight Riders. The core team remained the same in 2016, with Dwayne Bravo at the helm. However, the team's marquee foreign player was New Zealand's Brendon McCullum, who had played for KKR in the past. In 2017, Simon Katich replaced fellow Australian Simon Helmot as the head coach. Brad Hogg, Javon Searles, Brendon McCullum, Colin Munro, Darren Bravo and Chris Lynn had also played for both teams. As of 2026, Sunil Narine is the only player who plays for both the Knight Riders teams.

== Current squad ==
- Players with international caps are listed in **bold**.

As of 15 August 2025

No.	Name	Nat.	Birth date	Batting style	Bowling style	Year signed	Notes
Batsmen
—N/a	**Darren Bravo**	Trinidad and Tobago	6 February 1989 (age 37)	Left-handed	Right-arm medium	2025	
—N/a	**Keacy Carty**	Sint Maarten	19 March 1997 (age 29)	Right-handed	Right-arm medium	2023	
—N/a	**Alex Hales**	England	3 January 1989 (age 37)	Right-handed	Right-arm medium	2025	Overseas
All-rounders
—N/a	**Yannic Cariah**	Trinidad and Tobago	22 June 1992 (age 34)	Left-handed	Right-arm leg spin	2025	
—N/a	Nathan Edward	Sint Maarten	29 May 2005 (age 21)	Left-handed	Left-arm medium-fast	2025	
—N/a	**Colin Munro**	New Zealand	11 March 1987 (age 39)	Left-handed	Right-arm medium-fast	2025	Overseas
—N/a	**Sunil Narine**	Trinidad and Tobago	26 May 1988 (age 38)	Left-handed	Right-arm off-spin	2016	
—N/a	**Kieron Pollard**	Trinidad and Tobago	12 May 1987 (age 39)	Right-handed	Right-arm fast-medium	2019	
—N/a	**Andre Russell**	Jamaica	29 April 1988 (age 38)	Right-handed	Right-arm fast-medium	2022	
Wicket-keepers
—N/a	**Joshua Da Silva**	Trinidad and Tobago	19 June 1998 (age 28)	Right-handed		2025	
—N/a	**Nicholas Pooran**	Trinidad and Tobago	2 October 1995 (age 31)	Left-handed	Right-arm off break	2022	Captain
Spin bowlers
—N/a	**Akeal Hosein**	Trinidad and Tobago	25 April 1993 (age 33)	Left-handed	Left-arm orthodox	2019	
—N/a	Usman Tariq	Pakistan	1 January 1998 (age 28)	Right-handed	Right-arm offbreak	2025	Overseas
Pace bowlers
—N/a	**Mohammad Amir**	Pakistan	13 April 1992 (age 34)	Left-handed	Left-arm fast	2025	Overseas
—N/a	McKenny Clarke	Saint Lucia	5 June 2003 (age 23)	Right-handed	Right-arm medium-fast	2025	
—N/a	**Terrance Hinds**	Trinidad and Tobago	10 September 1992 (age 34)	Right-handed	Right-arm medium-fast	2024	
—N/a	**Ali Khan**	United States	13 December 1990 (age 35)	Right-handed	Right-arm fast-medium	2024	Overseas

- Source: Trinbago Knight Riders players

== Administration and support staff ==
Position	Name
CEO	Venky Mysore
Head Coach	Dwayne Bravo
Head of Cricket Strategy & Assistant Coach	Ryan ten Doeschate
Bowling Coach	Ottis Gibson
Spin Bowling Coach	Nikita Miller
Fielding Coach	Gibran Mohammed
Strength & Conditioning Coach	Zephyrinus Nicholas

== Statistics ==
As of February 2026

=== Most runs ===
Player	Seasons	Runs
Colin Munro	2016–present	2,594
Darren Bravo	2013–present	1,902
Kieron Pollard	2019–present	1,782
Nicholas Pooran	2013–present	1,538
Lendl Simmons	2019–2021	979
Source: ESPNcricinfo

=== Most wickets ===
Player	Seasons	Wickets
Dwayne Bravo	2013–2024	111
Sunil Narine	2016–present	102
Akeal Hosein	2019–present	62
Kevon Cooper	2013–2018	59
Ali Khan	2018–present	51
Source: ESPNcricinfo

== Overall results ==
=== Season's summary ===
As of 15 September 2021

CPL summary of results
Year	Played	Wins	Losses	Tied	NR	Win %	Position
2013	8	3	5	0	0	37.5%	4/6
2014	10	6	4	0	0	60%	4/6
2015	13	8	4	0	1	66.67%	1/6
2016	12	6	6	0	0	50%	3/6
2017	13	10	3	0	0	76.92%	1/6
2018	13	9	4	0	0	69.23%	1/6
2019	12	5	6	0	1	45.45%	3/6
2020	12	12	0	0	0	100%	1/6
2021	10	6	5	0	0	54.54%	3/6
2022	12	8	4	0	0	66.67%	2/6
Overall	104	65	37	0	2	63.72%	

- Source: ESPNcricinfo
- Abandoned matches are counted as NR (no result)
- Win or loss by super over or boundary count are counted as tied
- Tied+Win - Counted as a win and Tied+Loss - Counted as a loss
- NR indicates - No Result

== Home ground ==
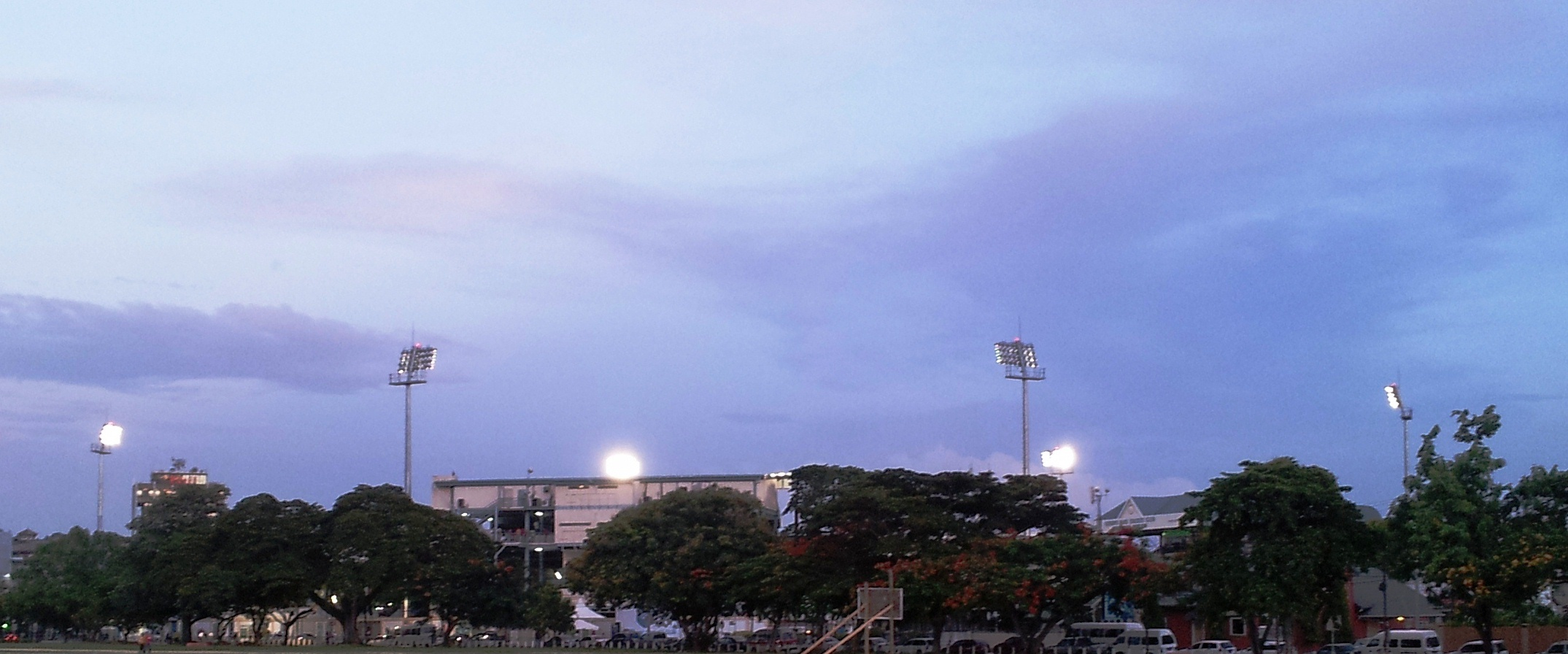
QPO – Flood lights turned on

The Trinbago Knight Riders plays their home games at the Queen's Park Oval in Port of Spain. The QPO was also the host ground of the semi-finals and finals of 2013 and 2015 editions of the CPL. The Queen's Park Oval is one of the oldest and most historic of grounds in the Caribbean as well as having one of the largest capacities, accommodating approximately 20,000 spectators in comfort. Home of the Queen's Park Cricket Club (QPCC) since 1896, it has hosted Test matches since 1930, ODIs since 1983 and T20s since 2009.

== Seasons ==
=== Caribbean Premier League ===
Year 2014	League standing	Final position
2013	4th out of 6	Semifinalists
2014	4th out of 6	Playoffs
2015	3rd out of 6	Champion
2016	4th out of 6	Qualifier
2017	1st out of 6	Champion
2018	1st out of 6	Champion
2019	4th out of 6	Qualifier
2020	1st out of 6	Champion
2021	1st out of 6	Semifinalists
2022	6th out of 6	League stage
2023	2nd out of 6	Runners-up
2024	3rd out of 6	Eliminator
2025	3rd out of 6	Champion

=== The 6ixty ===
Season	League standing	Final position
2022	3rd out of 6	Runners-up

== Knight Riders Group ==
Knight Riders Group also include the following teams in various T-20 format leagues and championships:-

- Trinbago Knight Riders (Women's)
- Kolkata Knight Riders
- Abu Dhabi Knight Riders
- Los Angeles Knight Riders
