= Antigua Hawksbills =

Antigua based franchise cricket team based in the Caribbean Premier League

Team information
- Founded: 2013
- Dissolved: 2014
- Home ground: Sir Vivian Richards Stadium
- Capacity: 10,000

History
- CPL wins: 0
- Official website: antiguahawksbills.com

Antigua Hawksbills was a Caribbean Premier League (CPL) franchise based in Antigua and Barbuda, that played its home games at the Sir Vivian Richards Stadium in Saint Peter Parish, Antigua. The name 'Hawksbills' comes after the Hawksbill Sea Turtle that populates around the Caribbean Sea and is critically endangered according to the World Conservation Union.

The franchise was one of six teams that was established for the inaugural CPL season in 2013, and the only one located in the Leeward Islands. The Hawksbills placed fifth in 2013, and then last during the 2014 edition of the CPL, winning three of out its sixteen games during that time. Antiguan Viv Richards coached the team in 2013, but was replaced by Tim Nielsen, an Australian, for the 2014 season. Marlon Samuels, a Jamaican, was the team's captain for both seasons.

In February 2015, it was announced that the Antigua Hawksbills would not participate in the 2015 CPL season, with a number of its players to instead play with a new franchise based in Saint Kitts and Nevis. It is intended that the Hawksbills franchise will be revived at a later date, with the CPL consequently featuring seven teams rather than six. And in 2024 the Team from Antigua and Barbuda returns as a new name of Antigua and Barbuda Falcons.

== Statistics ==
=== Most runs ===
Player	Seasons	Runs
Marlon Samuels	2013–2014	468
David Hussey	2014	166
Johnson Charles	2013	165
Kieran Powell	2013	156
Devon Thomas	2013–2014	153

- Source: ESPNcricinfo

=== Most wickets ===
Player	Seasons	Wickets
Sheldon Cottrell	2013–2014	18
Marlon Samuels	2013–2014	12
Carlos Brathwaite	2014	9
Gavin Tonge	2013	8
Ben Laughlin	2014	8
Rahkeem Cornwall	2013	8

- Source: ESPNcricinfo

== Stadium ==
The Sir Vivian Richards Stadium was the home ground of the Hawksbills during both campaigns of the 2013 and 2014 seasons respectively. The stadium hosts a capacity of 10,000 and is around a 10 minute drive from the capital city. The stadium was built after the 2007 Cricket World Cup that was staged in the West Indies with the ends named after two national icons in Curtly Ambrose and Andy Roberts. The team only won 2 out of the 6 games that were played in the stadium during their short history with both of the victories coming in the inaugural season of the Caribbean Premier League.

== Kits ==
The Hawksbills played in a predominantly black uniform that featured the yellow rising sun and also shades of light blue, white and red. The kit was replicated from the Antiguan Flag with Caribbean Alliance Insurance the main sponsor of the team. The kit manufacturer of the team was BAS (Beat All Sports) which sponsored all kits of the franchises.

== Seasons ==
Year	League standing	Final standing
2013	5th out of 6	League stage
2014	6th out of 6	League stage
