= Andre Fletcher =

Grenadian cricketer (born 1987)

Personal information
- Full name: Andre David Stephon Fletcher
- Born: 28 November 1987 (age 38); Saint David Parish, Grenada
- Nickname: Spiceman
- Height: 194 cm (6 ft 4 in)
- Batting: Right-handed
- Bowling: Right-arm medium-fast; Right-arm leg break
- Role: Batsman; Occasional wicket-keeper

International information
- National side: West Indies (2008–2024)
- ODI debut (cap 139): 24 June 2008 v Australia
- Last ODI: 26 June 2016 v Australia
- T20I debut (cap 24): 20 June 2008 v Australia
- Last T20I: 17 December 2024 v Bangladesh
- T20I shirt no.: 72

Domestic team information
- Years: Team
- 2003/04–2019/20: Windward Islands
- 2006–2008: Grenada
- 2013–2021: Saint Lucia Kings (squad no. 72)
- 2016, 2022: Khulna Titans
- 2017–2019: Sylhet Thunder
- 2018–2019: Peshawar Zalmi
- 2018: Nangarhar Leopards
- 2020/21: Melbourne Stars
- 2022–2024: St Kitts and Nevis Patriots
- 2022: Kandy Falcons
- 2022: Khulna Tigers
- 2025: Los Angeles Knight Riders

Career statistics
| Competition | ODI | T20I | FC | LA |
|---|---|---|---|---|
| Matches | 25 | 60 | 71 | 114 |
| Runs scored | 354 | 984 | 3678 | 2431 |
| Batting average | 14.16 | 19.68 | 31.16 | 22.93 |
| 100s/50s | –/2 | –/6 | 5/22 | 1/13 |
| Top score | 54 | 84* | 123 | 132 |
| Balls bowled | 28 | – | 229 | 106 |
| Wickets | – | – | 2 | 4 |
| Bowling average | – | – | 71.00 | 27.25 |
| 5 wickets in innings | 0 | – | 0 | 0 |
| 10 wickets in match | 0 | – | 0 | 0 |
| Best bowling | – | – | 2/32 | 2/3 |
| Catches/stumpings | 5/3 | 24/3 | 74/2 | 73/14 |
- Source: ESPNcricinfo, 5 April 2025

Andre Fletcher (born 28 November 1987) is a Grenadian cricketer who plays internationally for the West Indies. He is a right-handed batsman and often keeps wicket. He played domestic cricket for Windward Islands and Grenada. He was one of the few international cricketers to have come from Grenada. Fletcher was a member of the West Indies team that won the 2016 T20 World Cup.

== Domestic and T20 franchise career ==
He made his first-class debut for Windward Islands against Trinidad and Tobago on 30 January 2004 in the Carib Beer Cup.

Fletcher played for the West Indian U19 cricket team in the 2006 U-19 Cricket World Cup which was in Sri Lanka. He made his T20 debut in the inaugural edition of the Stanford Super Series on 14 July 2006 and won player of the match on his debut after scoring unbeaten 47 opening the batting for Grenada in a low scoring chase against Dominica. He made his List A debut against Guyana on 9 January 2007 in the 2006–07 KFC Cup.

Fletcher went onto become a regular feature in the Stanford Super Series where he played for the Stanford Superstars. During the 2008 Stanford Super Series, he opened the batting alongside Chris Gayle where he scored 90 off just 60 balls in a match against Middlesex, which included 3 fours and 7 sixes. He continued his form into the US$20 million showdown against England by scoring 32 not out, to earn himself US$1 million. He paid an attitude of gratitude to American investor Allen Stanford whom he revealed as a person to have changed his career with the introduction of Stanford Super Series. However, he lost the opportunity to earn US$1 million after Allen Stanford was embroiled in fraudulent scandal. He admitted that he accepted investment advice from Stanford's people before the commencement of the 2008 Stanford Super Series.

He was bought by St Lucia Zouks for the inaugural edition of the Caribbean Premier League in 2013. In the 2013 Caribbean Premier League, he ended up as the leading runscorer for his team with a tally of 238 in seven innings but St Lucia Zouks finished at last position in the tournament with registering only 2 wins. He would eventually end up as the leading rungetter after the end of the preliminary round of CPL 2013.

In October 2018, he was named in the squad for the Sylhet Sixers team, following the draft for the 2018–19 Bangladesh Premier League. In June 2019, he was selected to play for the Brampton Wolves franchise team in the 2019 Global T20 Canada tournament. In July 2020, he was named in the St Lucia Zouks squad for the 2020 Caribbean Premier League.

Fletcher was named in Melbourne Stars squad for 2020-21 Big Bash League season as a late replacement for Jonny Bairstow with the latter having to pull out due to national duty. After slow starts in his maiden BBL tournament, he came to the fore and repaid the faith the team had on him with an unbeaten 89 against Adelaide Strikers which guaranteed a thumping win for Stars. He revealed that former West Indies legendary batsman Brian Lara had instilled confidence in him and helped to unleash his batting prowess through a phone call, at a time when Fletcher was struggling for consistency and a lean patch of form with the bat for Melbourne Stars averaging 12.43 after first seven innings.

He was signed by Khulna Tigers for the 2020-21 Bangladesh Premier League and emerged as the leading runscorer for his team with a tally of 410 runs from 11 matches and was also the tournament's second top scorer just behind Will Jacks. During a group stage between Khulna Tigers and Chattogram Challengers on 22 January 2022, he faced concussion after being hit on his neck due to a delivery bowled by Rejaur Rahman Raja. He was later replaced by Sikandar Raza as a concussion substitute during the match and Fletcher as soon rushed to the hospital for scans.

In July 2022, he was signed by the Kandy Falcons for the third edition of the Lanka Premier League.

== International career ==
He earned the maiden international call-up to the West Indies team for the home limited overs series against Australia in 2008 on the back of an impressive domestic level performance. He scored his maiden first-class century playing for Windward Islands against Jamaica and his performances impressed the selectors and he was included in the final squad. He made his senior international debut in a Twenty20 match against Australia at Bridgetown on 20 June 2008. He made his ODI debut against Australia on 24 June 2008 just roughly four days after making his T20I debut against the same opposition. He was run out by Brad Haddin on his ODI debut for 26 runs.

He was subsequently picked for the 2009 ICC World Twenty20. He made good start with the bat for West Indies in their opening encounter against Australia by scoring 53 off just 32 balls at a strike rate of 165.62 which ensured a comfortable victory for West Indies in a high scoring run chase. He along with Chris Gayle added whopping 133 opening runstand during the match which made light work for the rest of the batting lineup to get to the finishing line. However, he struggled to replicate the knock against the other opponents in the remainder of the tournament as he could only manage 21 runs in his next 7 innings representing the West Indies, including 5 ducks in those 7 innings.

He was also named in a depleted West Indies squad which headed to South Africa without most of their first-choice players for the 2009 ICC Champions Trophy.

He was also included in the national squad for the home T20 World Cup tournament in 2010 as a backup wicketkeeper for misfiring Denesh Ramdin. He kept wickets in few group stage matches of the tournament. However, the move backfired heavily as he dropped crucial catches including that of Mahela Jayawardene in a group stage match against Sri Lanka with the latter went onto make the most of it by scoring 98 to pile up a misery on the home team.

He also featured in the West Indies squad for the 2014 ICC World Twenty20 where West Indies reached semi-finals.

During the 2016 T20 World Cup, he registered his career best knock of unbeaten 84 in a group stage match against Sri Lanka opening the batting which ensured a smooth run chase for West Indies despite losing few early wickets in the run chase. He came in as injury replacement for Chris Gayle in the match against Sri Lanka but was later pushed down the order in the remaining group stage matches to accommodate Gayle in the top order. He was replaced by Lendl Simmons ahead of the T20 World Cup semi-final against India.

He was named in the West Indies squad for the one off Hurricane Relief T20 Challenge against the World XI which was held on 31 May 2018.

In September 2021, Fletcher was named in the West Indies' squad for the 2021 ICC Men's T20 World Cup. He forced his way back into contention for a place in West Indies T20 World Cup squad on the back of an impressive 2021 Caribbean Premier League where he ended up scoring 229 runs in 12 matches.

== Personal life ==
Andre Fletcher is the younger brother of Grenadian Sprinter Sherry Fletcher.

In May 2015, he was arrested by the police at the Douglas Charles Airport in Dominica based on the charges of alleged possession of ammunition. During the time of his arrest, he had been practicing with the Windward Islands team. He was later fined EC $2000 after appearing before the magistrate in Dominica. It was later reported that he was not fully aware of about the possession of ammunition at the airport and he was released after being not found guilty as he was cleared of the charges. In addition, he was already termed as a person who lacked self-awareness of what is happening around him. Fletcher himself admitted and took full responsibility for the incident but revealed that he had no idea on how he had the package in his possession.
