= Jamaica Tallawahs =

Caribbean Premier League cricket team

- Nickname: Fi Wi Tallawahs

Personnel
- Captain: Brandon King
- Coach: Shivnarine Chanderpaul

Team information
- Colours: Green Black Gold
- Founded: 2013; 13 years ago
- Dissolved: 2023; 3 years ago
- Home ground: Sabina Park and Central Broward Regional Park
- Capacity: 15,600

History
- CPL wins: 3 (2013, 2016, 2022)
- 6ixty wins: 0
- Official website: tallawahs.com
T20I kit

The franchise Jamaica Tallawahs was the representative team of Jamaica in the Caribbean Premier League of cricket. It was one of the six teams created in 2013 for the inaugural season of the tournament. In December 2023, it was announced that the team would not participate in CPL 2024 due to a lack of support from the Jamaican government. Instead, Antigua & Barbuda Falcons from Antigua would take its place, ending Jamaica's run in the CPL. The Jamaica Tallawahs played their home games at Sabina Park in Kingston, Jamaica.

The Tallawahs won the inaugural tournament by defeating the Guyana Amazon Warriors in the final at Queen's Park Oval, they also won the 2016 CPL season. They are known for their formidable home record, winning 5 out of their 6 home games in CPL History since the end of the 2014 season. They are also the only team in CPL History to play all 11 local players in a match which they did in 2013 at home against the TT Red Steel where all 11 Tallawah players were Jamaican.

Hollywood actor Gerard Butler has an equity interest in the franchise.

After 2023 season, the owners were forced to sell back the franchise to the CPL, stating that they could not find a way to operate the team sustainably. This franchise was replaced by the Antigua & Barbuda Falcons franchise based in Antigua.

== Last squad ==
- Players with international caps are listed in **bold**.

As of 4 April 2022

No.	Name	Nationality	Birth date	Batting style	Bowling style	Year signed	Notes
Batsmen
—N/a	**Jermaine Blackwood**	Jamaica	20 November 1991 (age 34)	Right-handed	Right-arm off break	2023	
—N/a	**Shamarh Brooks**	Barbados	1 October 1988 (age 38)	Right-handed	Right-arm leg break	2021	
—N/a	**Alex Hales**	England	3 January 1989 (age 37)	Right-handed	Right-arm medium	2023	
—N/a	**Brandon King**	Jamaica	16 December 1994 (age 31)	Right-handed	–	2022	Captain
—N/a	**Kirk McKenzie**	Jamaica	9 November 2000 (age 25)	Left-handed	Right-arm off break	2021	
—N/a	**Steven Taylor**	United States	9 November 1993 (age 32)	Left-handed	Right-arm off spin	2023	
All-rounders
—N/a	**Fabian Allen**	Jamaica	7 May 1995 (age 31)	Right-handed	Left-arm orthodox	2022	
—N/a	**Chris Green**	Australia	1 October 1993 (age 33)	Right-handed	Right-arm off break	2021	
—N/a	**Raymon Reifer**	Barbados	11 May 1991 (age 35)	Left-handed	Left-arm medium-fast	2022	
—N/a	Shamar Springer	Barbados	26 November 1997 (age 28)	Right-handed	Right-arm medium-fast	2022	
—N/a	**Imad Wasim**	Pakistan	18 December 1988 (age 37)	Left-handed	Left-arm orthodox	2021	
Wicket-keepers
—N/a	Amir Jangoo	Trinidad and Tobago	14 July 1997 (age 29)	Right-handed	–	2022	
Spin bowlers
—N/a	**Hayden Walsh Jr.**	Antigua and Barbuda	23 April 1992 (age 34)	Left-handed	Right-arm leg break	2023	
Pace bowlers
—N/a	**Mohammad Amir**	Pakistan	13 April 1992 (age 34)	Left-handed	Left-arm fast	2022	
—N/a	Nicholson Gordon	Jamaica	22 October 1991 (age 35)	Right-handed	Right-arm medium-fast	2022	
—N/a	Salman Irshad	Pakistan	3 December 1995 (age 30)	Right-handed	Right-arm fast-medium	2023	
—N/a	Joshua James	Trinidad and Tobago	21 February 2001 (age 25)	Right-handed	Right-arm medium	2021	
—N/a	Kelvin Pitman	Antigua and Barbuda	4 June 2001 (age 25)	Right-handed	Right-arm fast	2023	

- Source:Jamaica Tallawahs players

== Results summary ==
As of 16 August 2023

CPL summary of results
Year	Played	Wins	Losses	Tied	NR	Win %
2013	9	7	2	0	0	77.78%
2014	11	7	4	0	0	63.64%
2015	11	4	6	0	1	40%
2016	13	8	4	0	1	66.67%
2017	11	6	5	0	0	54.55%
2018	11	6	5	0	0	54.55%
2019	10	2	8	0	0	20%
2020	11	3	7	0	1	30%
2021	10	4	6	0	0	40%
2022	13	7	5	0	1	58.33%
2023	12	4	7	0	1	49.16%
Total	122	58	59	0	5	50.42%

- Source: ESPNcricinfo
- Abandoned matches are counted as NR (no result).
- Win or loss by super over or boundary count are counted as tied.
- Tied+Win - Counted as a win and Tied+Loss - Counted as a loss.
- NR indicates - No Result.

== Administration and support staff ==
Position	Name
Head coach	Shivnarine Chanderpaul
Assistant coach	Andre Coley
Bowling coach	Curtly Ambrose

- Source: CricInfo, CricBuzz

== Statistics ==
As of 18 April 2024

=== Most runs ===
Player	Seasons	Runs
Chris Gayle	2013–2019	1,695
Andre Russell	2013–2021	1,491
Rovman Powell	2016–2022	1,337
Glenn Phillips	2017–2020	1,323
Chadwick Walton	2013–2021	1,278
Source: ESPNcricinfo

=== Most wickets ===
Player	Seasons	Wickets
Andre Russell	2013–2021	58
Krishmar Santokie	2015–2018	37
Oshane Thomas	2016–present	33
Kesrick Williams	2016–2017	32
Rusty Theron	2014–2015	22
Source: ESPNcricinfo

== Seasons ==
=== Caribbean Premier League ===
Year	League standing	Final standing
2013	2nd out of 6	Champion
2014	4th out of 6	Playoffs
2015	4th out of 6	Playoffs
2016	2nd out of 6	Champion
2017	3rd out of 6	Eliminator
2018	3rd out of 6	Eliminator
2019	6th out of 6	League stage
2020	4th out of 6	Semi-finalists
2021	5th out of 6	League stage
2022	4th out of 6	Champion
2023	4th out of 6	Playoffs

=== The 6ixty ===
Season	League standing	Final position
2022	1st out of 6	Semi-finalists
