= Barbados Tridents =

T20 franchise based in Barbados

- Barbados Royals (2021–2025)
- Official logo of the Barbados Tridents

Personnel
- Captain: Rovman Powell
- Coach: Trevor Penney
- Owner: TBC

Team information
- Colours: Blue; Yellow
- Founded: 2013; 13 years ago
- Home ground: Kensington Oval
- Capacity: 11,000

History
- CPL wins: 2 (2014, 2019)
- 6ixty wins: 0
- Official website: barbados-tridents.com
T20I kit

Royals Group

Current Teams
- Rajasthan Royals (2008–present); 1 (2008); Barbados Tridents (2021–present); Barbados Tridents Women (2022–present); 2 (2023), (2024); Paarl Royals (2022–present)

The Barbados Tridents (known as the Barbados Royals from 2021 to 2025) are the representative franchise cricket team of Barbados in the Caribbean Premier League. They are one of the six teams specifically created in 2013 for the inaugural season of the tournament. Hollywood actor Mark Wahlberg had an equity interest in the team since 2013 after he was introduced to the game by his friend Ajmal Khan, the club's chairman and CPL architect.

In 2014 CPL they qualified for the champions league. They were out of the tournament in the group stage managing to win only one of their four matches. On 30 July 2021, it was announced that the team name would be changed from the Barbados Tridents to the Barbados Royals. On 13 May 2026, it was announced that following a partnership with the Royals Sports Group and the Government of Barbados, the team name would return to the Barbados Tridents for the 2026 season.

Barbados Tridents as part of the Royals Sports Group, are two-time Caribbean Premier League champions, lifting the trophy in 2014 and 2019. In 2022, Barbados Tridents continue its journey in CPL and managed to closed some sponsorship deals like MCW Sports.

== Current squad ==
- Players with international caps are listed in **bold**.

As of 14 August 2025

No.	Name	Nationality	Birth date	Batting style	Bowling style	Year signed	Notes
Batsmen
—N/a	Kofi James	Antigua and Barbuda	23 December 1997 (age 28)	Right-handed	Right-arm off spin	2025	
—N/a	**Brandon King**	Jamaica	16 December 1994 (age 31)	Right-handed		2025	
—N/a	Zishan Motara	Barbados	14 July 2006 (age 20)	Right-handed	Right-arm leg spin	2025	
—N/a	Shaqkere Parris	Trinidad and Tobago	29 May 2003 (age 23)	Right-handed		2025	
—N/a	**Rovman Powell**	Jamaica	23 July 1993 (age 33)	Right-handed	Right-arm fast-medium	2023	Captain
—N/a	**Sherfane Rutherford**	Guyana	15 August 1998 (age 28)	Left-handed	Right-arm fast-medium	2025	
All-rounders
—N/a	Kadeem Alleyne	Barbados	1 January 2001 (age 25)	Right-handed	Right-arm medium	2025	
—N/a	Johann Layne	Barbados	10 September 2003 (age 23)	Right-handed	Right-arm medium-fast	2025	
—N/a	**Azmatullah Omarzai**	Afghanistan	24 March 2000 (age 26)	Right-handed	Right-arm fast-medium	2025	Overseas
—N/a	**Daniel Sams**	Australia	27 October 1992 (age 33)	Right-handed	Left-arm fast-medium	2025	Overseas
Wicket-keepers
—N/a	Rivaldo Clarke	Barbados	29 December 2002 (age 23)	Right-handed	Right-arm medium	2025	
—N/a	**Quinton de Kock**	South Africa	17 December 1992 (age 33)	Left-handed		2024	Overseas
Spin bowlers
—N/a	**Mujeeb Ur Rahman**	Afghanistan	28 March 2001 (age 25)	Right-handed	Right-arm off break	2025	Overseas
—N/a	**Jomel Warrican**	Saint Vincent and the Grenadines	20 May 1992 (age 34)	Right-handed	Slow left-arm orthodox	2025	
Pace bowlers
—N/a	**Eathan Bosch**	South Africa	27 April 1998 (age 28)	Right-handed	Right-arm fast	2025	Overseas
—N/a	Ramon Simmonds	Barbados	16 October 2001 (age 25)	Left-handed	Left-arm medium-fast	2022	
—N/a	Nyeem Young	Barbados	22 September 2000 (age 26)	Right-handed	Right-arm medium	2020	

- Source: Barbados Royals Players

== Statistical summary ==
As of 15 September 2021

Year	Played	Wins	Losses	Tied	NR	Win %	Position
2013	8	4	4	0	0	50%	3/6
2014	10	7	3	0	0	70%	1/6
2015	11	6	5	0	0	54.54%	2/6
2016	10	3	6	0	1	30%	5/6
2017	10	4	6	0	0	40%	5/6
2018	10	2	8	0	0	20%	6/6
2019	13	7	6	0	0	61.53%	1/6
2020	10	3	7	0	0	30%	5/6
2021	10	3	7	0	0	30%	6/6
2022	12	9	3	0	0	80%	1/6
Total	103	48	55	0	1	42.39%	

- Abandoned matches are counted as NR (no result)
- Win or loss by super over or boundary count are counted as tied.
- Tied+Win - Counted as a win and Tied+Loss - Counted as a loss
- NR indicates no result

Source: ESPNcricinfo

== Administration and support staff ==
Position	Name
Head coach	Trevor Penney

== 2026 Season ==
The Barbados Tridents began the 2026 Caribbean Premier League season with two consecutive victories before suffering their first defeat against the Antigua and Barbuda Falcons on 25 August, losing by 30 runs at the Sir Vivian Richards Stadium in North Sound Antigua. The Tridents were dismissed for 125 in 18 overs after the Falcons scored 155 for five. Shian Brathwaithe, who joined the squad as a replacement for Kadeem Alleyne, made his debut for the Tridents in the match.

== Seasons ==
=== Caribbean Premier League ===
Year	League standing	Final standing
2013	3rd out of 6	Semi-finalists
2014	1st out of 6	Champion
2015	1st out of 6	Runners-up
2016	5th out of 6	League stage
2017	5th out of 6	League stage
2018	6th out of 6	League stage
2019	2nd out of 6	Champion
2020	5th out of 6	League stage
2021	6th out of 6	League stage
2022	1st out of 6	Runners-up
2023	5th out of 6	League stage
2024	4th out of 6	Qualifier

=== The 6ixty ===
Season	League standing	Final position
2022	2nd out of 6	Semi-finalists

== See also ==
- Barbados Royals (WCPL)
