= Krishmar Santokie =

Jamaican cricketer

Personal information
- Full name: Krishmar Santokie
- Born: 20 December 1984 (age 41); Clarendon, Jamaica
- Batting: Left-handed
- Bowling: Left-arm medium fast

Domestic team information
- Years: Team
- 2007/08–2012/13: Jamaica
- 2013: Khulna Royal Bengals
- 2013–2014: Guyana Amazon Warriors
- 2014: Mumbai Indians
- 2015: Jamaica Tallawahs
- 2015: Comilla Victorians
- 2016: St Kitts and Nevis Patriots
- 2017-2018: Jamaica Tallawahs
- 2019-2020: Sylhet Thunder

Career statistics
Competition	T20I	LA	T20
Matches	12	14	119
Runs scored	0	18	222
Batting average	–	6.00	9.25
100s/50s	0/0	0/0	0/0
Top score	0*	8*	22
Balls bowled	245	665	2,627
Wickets	18	17	180
Bowling average	15.44	25.64	17.56
5 wickets in innings	0	0	1
10 wickets in match	0	0	0
Best bowling	4/21	3/30	5/24
Catches/stumpings	1/–	4/–	21/–
- Source: ESPNcricinfo, 25 March 2025

Krishmar Santokie (born 20 December 1984) is a former Jamaican cricketer. He played for Jamaica and represented the West Indies in Twenty20 Internationals. He bowled left-arm medium pace and was a lower order batsman.

== Domestic career ==
He represented the Guyana Amazon Warriors in the Caribbean Premier League in 2013.

His slingy action & ability to deliver deceiving slower balls has made him an asset to T20 teams. Santokie spent a number of years playing in England for Farnham Royal cricket club where he used the English conditions to perfect his swing bowling technique which has continued with him into his international career.

He played for the Mumbai Indians in the 2014 Indian Premier League tournament.

Santokie came under scrutiny in December 2019 while playing for the Sylhet Thunder of the BPL when he overstepped on a delivery by a significant distance. The BCB launched an investigation shortly after the event. As of December, 2019, Santokie's career Twenty20 bowling average of 17.09 was the best by a West Indian, 18th best of active cricketers and 28th best of all time.

== International career ==
His debut for the West Indies came in a Twenty20 International against England in September 2011, he finished with bowling figures of 1/17 in a West Indies victory.

Despite having the fourth lowest T20I bowling average of all time (15.44) and the 28th best economy rate (6.80), Santokie only played 12 matches for the West Indies before being dropped at age 29 in 2014. In his T20I career, he did not score any runs from his twelve matches, only batting once.
