= List of St Lucia Kings cricketers =

This is a list of cricketers who have represented Saint Lucia Kings (previously known as St Lucia Zouks and St Lucia Stars) in the Caribbean Premier League (CPL) since the first season of the CPL in 2013. Players are listed alphabetically using the standard naming format of their country of origin followed by the year(s) that they have been active as a St Lucia player.

For a list of current players see the current squad.

As of 26 August 2021

== Players ==
=== A ===
- Kamran Akmal (2017)
- Sunil Ambris (2014, 2017)
- Kadeem Alleyne (2021)

=== B ===
- Christopher Barnwell (2019)
- Tino Best (2013-2014)
- Saad Bin Zafar (2020)
- Leniko Boucher (2020)

=== C ===
- John Campbell (2019)
- Roland Cato (2019)
- Mark Chapman (2018)
- Johnson Charles (2014-2017)
- Roston Chase (2020–present)
- Rahkeem Cornwall (2017–present)
- Keron Cottoy (2021)

=== D ===
- Tim David (2021)
- Henry Davids (2014-2015)
- Derone Davis (2016)
- Colin de Grandhomme (2019)
- Cameron Delport (2019)
- Mark Deyal (2020–present)
- Niroshan Dickwella (2018)
- Faf du Plessis (2021)

=== E ===
- Grant Elliott (2016)
- Fidel Edwards (2015)

=== F ===
- Fawad Ahmed (2019)
- Andre Fletcher (2013–present)

=== G ===
- Shannon Gabriel (2015)
- Herschelle Gibbs (2013)
- Javelle Glen (2020–present)

=== H ===
- Jahmar Hamilton (2019)
- Chandrapaul Hemraj (2018)
- Kavem Hodge (2013, 2018–2020)
- Chemar Holder (2020)
- Michael Hussey (2016)

=== J ===
- Delorn Johnson (2015-2016)
- Ray Jordan (2014)
- Alzarri Joseph (2021)

=== K ===
- Scott Kuggeleijn (2020)
- Nitish Kumar (2016, 2019)

=== L ===
- Christopher Lamont (2018)
- Eddie Leie (2015-2017)
- Keddy Lesporis (2014-2017, 2019)

=== M ===
- Jaskaran Malhotra (2018)
- Lasith Malinga (2019)
- Garey Mathurin (2013-2014)
- Mervin Matthew (2014)
- Kyle Mayers (2015-2017)
- Andre McCarthy (2019)
- Mitchell McClenaghan (2017-2018)
- Nathan McCullum (2015)
- Obed McCoy (2017–present)
- Kimani Melius (2020)
- David Miller (2016)
- Misbah-ul-Haq (2013)
- Mohammad Nabi (2020)
- Albie Morkel (2013)
- Morné Morkel (2016)

=== N ===
- Najibullah Zadran (2019-2020)

=== P ===
- Nelon Pascal (2013)
- Samit Patel (2021)
- Timil Patel (2017)
- Keemo Paul (2021)
- Thisara Perera (2019)
- Kenroy Peters (2013)
- Kevin Pietersen (2014-2015)
- Dalton Polius (2013)
- Kieron Pollard (2018)
- Gidron Pope (2015-2016)

=== Q ===
- Usman Qadir (2021)
- Qais Ahmad (2018)

=== R ===
- Kristopher Ramsaran (2016)
- Wahab Riaz (2021)
- Kemar Roach (2015)
- Jeavor Royal (2019, 2021)
- Jesse Ryder (2017)

=== S ===
- Mohammad Sami (2018)
- Daren Sammy (2013-2014, 2016–2020)
- Marlon Samuels (2017)
- Krishmar Santokie (2019)
- Liam Sebastien (2013-2015)
- Shane Shillingford (2013-2017)
- D'Arcy Short (2018)
- Lendl Simmons (2018)
- Devon Smith (2013)
- Odean Smith (2018)

=== T ===
- Tamim Iqbal (2013)
- Sohail Tanvir (2014)
- Jerome Taylor (2016-2017)
- Ross Taylor (2015)

=== V ===
- Roelof van der Merwe (2014)
- Hardus Viljoen (2019)

=== W ===
- Shane Watson (2016-2017)
- David Warner (2018)
- David Wiese (2021)
- Tonito Willett (2014)
- Kesrick Williams (2018–present)

=== Z ===
- Zahir Khan (2020)

== Captains ==
St Lucia Zouks captains
No.	Name	Span	Mat	Won	Lost	Tie	NR	Win%
1	(Saint Lucia) Daren Sammy	2013-2020	62	23	37	0	2	37.09
2	(South Africa) Faf du Plessis	2021-2021	9	5	4	0	0	55.55
3	(Trinidad and Tobago) Kieron Pollard	2018-2018	9	3	6	0	0	33.33
4	(Australia) Shane Watson	2017-2017	4	0	3	0	1	0.00
5	(Grenada) Andre Fletcher	2021-2021	3	1	2	0	0	33.33
6	(South Africa) Kevin Pietersen	2015-2015	3	1	2	0	0	33.33

- Last updated: 15 September 2021
- Source: Cricinfo
