= 2015–16 Regional Super50 =

Cricket tournament

2015–16 NAGICO Super50
- Dates: 7 – 23 January 2016
- Administrator: WICB
- Cricket format: List A (50 overs)
- Tournament format(s): Group stage, finals
- Host(s): Saint Kitts; Trinidad and Tobago
- Champions: Trinidad and Tobago (12th title)
- Participants: 8
- Matches: 27
- Most runs: (Trinidad and Tobago) Darren Bravo (274)
- Most wickets: (Barbados) Sulieman Benn (15)

The 2015–16 NAGICO Super50 was the 42nd edition of the Regional Super50, the domestic limited-overs cricket competition for the countries of the West Indies Cricket Board (WICB). The tournament was co-hosted by Saint Kitts and Trinidad and Tobago, with the final held at Queen's Park Oval, Port of Spain.

Eight teams participated in the competition – the six regular teams of West Indian domestic cricket (Barbados, Guyana, Jamaica, the Leeward Islands, Trinidad and Tobago, and the Windward Islands), plus two development teams (Combined Campuses and Colleges and ICC Americas). The ICC Americas team, featuring players from countries outside the scope of the WICB, was competing for the first time. Trinidad and Tobago eventually defeated Barbados in the final, winning their twelfth domestic one-day title.

On 15 January, umpire Jacqueline Williams stood in the match between Trinidad & Tobago and ICC Americas, becoming the first female umpire to stand in the domestic 50-over competition in the West Indies.

== Squads ==
Barbados	(Cricket West Indies) Combined Campuses	Guyana	(Combined Islands) ICC Americas
Kevin Stoute (c); Sulieman Benn; Tino Best; Shamarh Brooks; Jonathan Carter; Roston Chase; Kyle Corbin; Dane Currency; Justin Greaves; Ashley Nurse; Mario Rampersaud; Dwayne Smith; Hayden Walsh, Jr.; Kenroy Williams	Chadwick Walton (c); Jovan Ali; Anthony Alleyne; Cassius Burton; Akeem Dewar; Mark Deyal; Nino Henry; Chemar Holder; Aaron Jones; Vikash Mohan; Christopher Powell; Rovman Powell; Kristopher Ramsaran	Leon Johnson (c); Christopher Barnwell; Kevon Boodie; Anthony Bramble; Shivnarine Chanderpaul; Royston Crandon; Assad Fudadin; Steven Jacobs; Gudakesh Motie; Veerasammy Permaul; Raymon Reifer; Romario Shepherd; Vishaul Singh; Paul Wintz	Ruvindu Gunasekera (c); Danial Ahmed; Timroy Allen; Alex Amsterdam; Navneet Dhaliwal; Akeem Dodson; Muhammad Ghous; Jeremy Gordon; Ali Khan; Nitish Kumar; Timil Patel; Hammad Shahid; Hamza Tariq; Steven Taylor; Srimantha Wijeratne
Jamaica	Leeward Islands	Trinidad and Tobago	Windward Islands
John Campbell (c); Jermaine Blackwood; Sheldon Cottrell; Trevon Griffith; Jermaine Harrison; Damion Jacobs; Brandon King; Tamar Lambert; Andre McCarthy; Nikita Miller; Marquino Mindley; Jerome Taylor; Aldane Thomas; Devon Thomas	Jahmar Hamilton (c); Quinton Boatswain; Nkruma Bonner; Odean Brown; Daron Cruickshank; Rahkeem Cornwall; Montcin Hodge; Chesney Hughes; Shane Jeffers; Jeremiah Louis; Orlando Peters; Sherwin Peters; Jacques Taylor; Gavin Tonge	Jason Mohammed (c); Kevon Cooper; Narsingh Deonarine; Rayad Emrit; Kyle Hope; Akeal Hosein; Jon-Russ Jaggesar; Steven Katwaroo; Imran Khan; Evin Lewis; Kjorn Ottley; Yannick Ottley; Marlon Richards; Philton Williams	Liam Sebastien (c); Sunil Ambris; Miles Bascombe; Johnson Charles; Keron Cottoy; Andre Fletcher; Kavem Hodge; Delorn Johnson; Vincent Lewis; Mervin Matthew; Kyle Mayers; Shane Shillingford; Devon Smith; Tyrone Theophile

== Group stage ==
=== Group A ===
Team	Pld	W	L	T	A	BP	Pts	NRR
Trinidad and Tobago	6	4	1	0	1	4	22	+1.492
Barbados	6	4	2	0	0	2	18	+0.224
Jamaica	6	3	3	0	0	2	14	+0.186
(Combined Islands) ICC Americas	6	0	5	0	1	0	2	–2.110

7 January 2016
Scorecard

ICC Americas (Combined Islands); 183 (43.1 overs)	v	Barbados; 184/6 (42.5 overs)

Barbados won by 4 wickets
Sir Frank Worrell Memorial Ground, Saint Augustine
Player of the match: Sulieman Benn (Bar)

- List A debuts: Roston Chase, Justin Greaves (Barbados); Danial Ahmed, Alex Amsterdam, Timil Patel, Hammad Shahid, Steven Taylor (ICC Americas)

7 January 2016
Scorecard

Trinidad and Tobago; 221 (47.2 overs)	v	Jamaica; 137 (42.5 overs)

Trinidad and Tobago won by 84 runs
Queen's Park Oval, Port of Spain
Player of the match: Marlon Richards (T&T)

- List A debuts: Brandon King, Aldane Thomas (Jamaica); Philton Williams, Jon-Russ Jaggesar (T&T)

9 January 2016
Scorecard

Jamaica; 260/8 (50 overs)	v	(Combined Islands) ICC Americas; 76 (26.4 overs)

Jamaica won by 184 runs
Sir Frank Worrell Memorial Ground, Saint Augustine
Player of the match: Andre McCarthy (Jam)

- List A debut: Ali Khan (ICC Americas)

9 January 2016
Scorecard

Barbados; 161 (49.3 overs)	v	Trinidad and Tobago; 163/1 (35.5 overs)

Trinidad and Tobago won by 9 wickets
Queen's Park Oval, Port of Spain
Player of the match: Kjorn Ottley (T&T)

11 January 2016
Scorecard

ICC Americas (Combined Islands)	v	Trinidad and Tobago

Match abandoned
Shaw Park, Scarborough

11 January 2016
Scorecard

Barbados; 138 (45.5 overs)	v	Jamaica; 139/8 (39 overs)

Jamaica won by 2 wickets
Queen's Park Oval, Port of Spain
Player of the match: Sheldon Cottrell (Jam)

- List A debut: Dane Currency (Barbados)

13 January 2016
Scorecard

Jamaica; 176 (49.4 overs)	v	Trinidad and Tobago; 177/3 (38.5 overs)

Trinidad and Tobago won by 7 wickets
Shaw Park, Scarborough
Player of the match: Evin Lewis (T&T)

- List A debut: Jermaine Harrison (Jamaica)

13 January 2016
Scorecard

ICC Americas (Combined Islands); 202 (49.4 overs)	v	Barbados; 206/6 (36.3 overs)

Barbados won by 4 wickets
Queen's Park Oval, Port of Spain
Player of the match: Kraigg Brathwaite (Bar)

15 January 2016
Scorecard

Barbados; 246/9 (50 overs)	v	Jamaica; 173 (46.5 overs)

Barbados won by 73 runs
National Cricket Centre, Couva
Player of the match: Dwayne Smith (Bar)

15 January 2016
Scorecard

ICC Americas (Combined Islands); 81 (26 overs)	v	Trinidad and Tobago; 84/1 (12.5 overs)

Trinidad and Tobago won by 9 wickets
Queen's Park Oval, Port of Spain
Player of the match: Imran Khan (T&T)

- List A debut: Muhammad Ghous (ICC Americas)

17 January 2016
Scorecard

ICC Americas (Combined Islands); 253/8 (50 overs)	v	Jamaica; 257/9 (45.1 overs)

Jamaica won by 1 wicket
National Cricket Centre, Couva
Player of the match: John Campbell (Jam)

17 January 2016
Scorecard

Trinidad and Tobago; 226 (50 overs)	v	Barbados; 227/7 (48 overs)

Barbados won by 3 wickets
Queen's Park Oval, Port of Spain
Player of the match: Jason Holder (Bar)

=== Group B ===
Team	Pld	W	L	T	NR	BP	Pts	NRR
Windward Islands	6	4	1	0	1	0	18	–0.351
Guyana	6	4	2	0	0	2	18	+0.516
(Cricket West Indies) Combined Campuses	6	1	3	0	2	1	9	+0.135
Leeward Islands	6	1	4	0	1	0	6	–0.340

7 January 2016
Scorecard

Windward Islands; 214 (50 overs)	v	Guyana; 122/4 (26 overs)

Windward Islands won by 1 run (D/L)
St Paul's Sporting Complex, St Paul's

- List A debut: Gudakesh Motie (Guyana)

7 January 2016
Scorecard

Leeward Islands; 187/5 (38 overs)	v	(Cricket West Indies) Combined Campuses

No result
Warner Park, Basseterre

- Rain ended play after 38 overs of the first innings.
- List A debuts: Aaron Jones, Mark Deyal, Chemar Holder, Vikash Mohan (Combined Campuses)

9 January 2016
Scorecard

Combined Campuses (Cricket West Indies); 233/6 (40 overs)	v	Windward Islands; 40/3 (7.4 overs)

No result
St Paul's Sporting Complex, St Paul's

- Combined Campuses' innings was reduced to 40 overs.
- List A debuts: Nino Henry, Kristopher Ramsaran (Combined Campuses)

9 January 2016
Scorecard

Guyana; 219/9 (50 overs)	v	Leeward Islands; 147 (46 overs)

Guyana won by 72 runs
Warner Park, Basseterre
Player of the match: Shivnarine Chanderpaul (Guy)

- List A debut: Daron Cruickshank (Leewards)

11 January 2016
Scorecard

Combined Campuses (Cricket West Indies); 149 (48.3 overs)	v	Guyana; 153/4 (38.4 overs)

Guyana won by 6 wickets
St Paul's Sporting Complex, St Paul's

11 January 2016
Scorecard

Leeward Islands; 238/7 (50 overs)	v	Windward Islands; 239/9 (49.3 overs)

Windward Islands won by 1 wicket
Warner Park, Basseterre
Player of the match: Kyle Mayers (Win)

13 January 2016
Scorecard

Leeward Islands; 242/8 (50 overs)	v	(Cricket West Indies) Combined Campuses; 228 (49.1 overs)

Leeward Islands won by 14 runs
St Paul's Sporting Complex, St Paul's
Player of the match: Nkruma Bonner (Lee)

- List A debut: Jovan Ali (Combined Campuses)

13 January 2016
Scorecard

Guyana; 209/9 (50 overs)	v	Windward Islands; 210/8 (49.3 overs)

Windward Islands won by 2 wickets
Warner Park, Basseterre
Player of the match: Royston Crandon (Guy)

15 January 2016
Scorecard

Leeward Islands; 172 (49.4 overs)	v	Guyana; 174/3 (46.2 overs)

Guyana won by 7 wickets
St Paul's Sporting Complex, St Paul's
Player of the match: Romario Shepherd (Guy)

- List A debut: Romario Shepherd (Guyana)

15 January 2016
Scorecard

Combined Campuses (Cricket West Indies); 157 (47.5 overs)	v	Windward Islands; 66 (23 overs)

Combined Campuses won by 91 runs
Warner Park, Basseterre
Player of the match: Chemar Holder (CCC)

17 January 2016
Scorecard

Windward Islands; 243/6 (49 overs)	v	Leeward Islands; 238/9 (49 overs)

Windward Islands won by 5 runs
St Paul's Sporting Complex, St Paul's
Player of the match: Sunil Ambris (Win)

- The match was reduced to 49 overs per side before the start of play.

17 January 2016
Scorecard

Combined Campuses (Cricket West Indies); 254/7 (50 overs)	v	Guyana; 255/5 (49.3 overs)

Guyana won by 5 wickets
Warner Park, Basseterre
Player of the match: Assad Fudadin (Guy)

- List A debut: Kevon Boodie (Guyana)

== Knockout stage ==
=== Semi-finals ===
1st Semi-Final
20 January 2016
Scorecard

Trinidad and Tobago; 259/9 (50 overs)	v	Guyana; 205 (48.3 overs)
Darren Bravo 95 (108); Veerasammy Permaul 3/56 (10 overs)		Anthony Bramble 51 (44); Jon-Russ Jaggesar 3/36 (9.3 overs)

Trinidad and Tobago won by 54 runs
Queen's Park Oval, Port of Spain
Umpires: Patrick Gustard and Leslie Reifer
Player of the match: Darren Bravo (Tri)

- Guyana won the toss and elected to field.

2nd Semi-Final
21 January 2016
Scorecard

Windward Islands; 175 (45.4 overs)	v	Barbados; 179/3 (44.3 overs)
Devon Smith 44 (58); Sulieman Benn 4/26 (10 overs)		Kraigg Brathwaite 80* (120); Kyle Mayers 1/17 (4 overs)

Barbados won by 7 wickets
Queen's Park Oval, Port of Spain
Umpires: Peter Nero and Joel Wilson
Player of the match: Sulieman Benn (Bar)

- Windward Islands won the toss and elected to bat.

=== Final ===
Final
23 January 2016
Scorecard

Trinidad and Tobago; 270/7 (50 overs)	v	Barbados; 198 (42.5 overs)
Darren Bravo 97 (104); Carlos Brathwaite 2/54 (10 overs)		Shai Hope 50 (94); Rayad Emrit 3/46 (9.5 overs)

Trinidad and Tobago won by 72 runs
Queen's Park Oval, Port of Spain
Umpires: Lennox Abraham and Patrick Gustard
Player of the match: Darren Bravo (Tri)

- Barbados won the toss and elected to field.

== Statistics ==
=== Most runs ===
The top five run-scorers are included in this table, listed by runs scored and then by batting average.

Player	Team	Runs	Inns	Avg	Highest	100s	50s
Darren Bravo	Trinidad and Tobago	274	3	91.33	97	0	3
Assad Fudadin	Guyana	259	7	51.80	103*	1	1
Andre McCarthy	Jamaica	251	6	41.83	118	1	0
Kyle Hope	Trinidad and Tobago	227	7	37.83	70*	0	1
Nkruma Bonner	Leeward Islands	223	6	37.16	79	0	2

=== Most wickets ===
The top five wicket-takers are listed in this table, listed by wickets taken and then by bowling average.

Player	Team	Overs	Wkts	Ave	Econ	SR	BBI
Sulieman Benn	Barbados	61.0	15	13.80	3.39	24.4	4/26
Jon-Russ Jaggesar	Trinidad and Tobago	49.4	14	13.50	3.80	21.2	4/32
Damion Jacobs	Jamaica	58.4	14	16.78	4.00	25.1	5/22
Delorn Johnson	Windward Islands	47.5	14	17.07	4.99	20.5	6/37
Veerasammy Permaul	Guyana	67.2	14	18.78	3.90	28.8	4/22
