= 2018 Caribbean Premier League =

Sixth season of the Caribbean Premier League

- Dates: 8 August – 16 September 2018
- Administrator(s): CPL Limited
- Cricket format: Twenty20
- Tournament format(s): Group stage and knockout
- Champions: Trinbago Knight Riders (3rd title)
- Runners-up: Guyana Amazon Warriors
- Participants: 6
- Matches: 34
- Attendance: 396,488 (11,661 per match)
- Player of the series: Colin Munro (Trinbago Knight Riders)
- Most runs: Colin Munro (Trinbago Knight Riders) (567)
- Most wickets: Fawad Ahmed (Trinbago Knight Riders) (22)
- Official website: cplt20.com

The 2018 Caribbean Premier League (CPLT20) or for sponsorship reasons, Hero CPL 2018 was the sixth season of the Caribbean Premier League, the domestic Twenty20 cricket league in the West Indies. Matches were played in seven countries – Trinidad and Tobago, Saint Kitts and Nevis, Guyana, Barbados, Jamaica, Saint Lucia, with three of the matches were played at Lauderhill, Florida, United States. The tournament started on 8 August 2018.

In July 2018, two changes to the playing conditions were announced for the tournament. The first was a penalty to a team's net run rate for failing to bowl their overs in the given time. The second change was the introduction of a coin toss, to determine who will bat first if a Super Over is needed to decide the result of the match. The Decision Review System (DRS) was used in the last two matches of the tournament.

Trinbago Knight Riders beat Guyana Amazon Warriors by eight wickets in the final to win their third CPL title.

== Squads ==
The following players were selected for the tournament:

Barbados Tridents	Guyana Amazon Warriors	Jamaica Tallawahs	St Kitts & Nevis Patriots	St Lucia Stars	Trinbago Knight Riders
Jason Holder (c); Martin Guptill; ~~Shakib Al Hasan~~; Hashim Amla; Dwayne Smith; Nicholas Pooran; Wahab Riaz; Raymon Reifer; Ashley Nurse; Roston Chase; Shai Hope; Tion Webster; Imran Khan; Shamar Springer; Sunny Sohal; Chemar Holder; Dominic Drakes; Steve Smith; Mohammad Irfan; ~~Junaid Khan~~	Chris Green (c); ~~Shoaib Malik~~; Sohail Tanvir; Chadwick Walton; Cameron Delport; Imran Tahir; Jason Mohammed; Luke Ronchi; Veerasammy Permaul; Roshon Primus; Shimron Hetmyer; Devendra Bishoo; Gajanand Singh; Sherfane Rutherford; Romario Shepherd; Keemo Paul; Saurabh Netravalkar; Akshaya Persaud; Rayad Emrit	Andre Russell (c); ~~Shahid Afridi~~; ~~Imad Wasim~~; David Miller; Ross Taylor; Rovman Powell; Samuel Badree; Kemar Roach; Glenn Phillips; Andre McCarthy; Krishmar Santokie; Johnson Charles; Steven Taylor; Kennar Lewis; Steven Jacobs; Oshane Thomas; Kirstan Kallicharan; Elmore Hutchinson; ~~Adam Zampa~~; Jermaine Blackwood; Colin de Grandhomme; Ish Sodhi	Chris Gayle (c); Ben Cutting; Evin Lewis; Faheem Ashraf; Carlos Brathwaite; ~~Mahmudullah~~; Tabraiz Shamsi; ~~Tom Cooper~~; Sheldon Cottrell; Brandon King; Devon Thomas; ~~Graeme Cremer~~; Fabian Allen; Shamarh Brooks; ~~Sandeep Lamichhane~~; Jeremiah Louis; Alzarri Joseph; Ibrahim Khaleel; Saad Bin Zafar; Javelle Glen; Hayden Walsh Jr.; Anton Devcich; Rassie van der Dussen	Kieron Pollard (c); Lendl Simmons; Darren Sammy; ~~Rumman Raees~~; Andre Fletcher; Mitchell McClenaghan; Kesrick Williams; Niroshan Dickwella; Rahkeem Cornwall; Qais Ahmad; Kavem Hodge; Chandrapaul Hemraj; ~~Dasun Shanaka~~; Christopher Lamont; Obed McCoy; Odean Smith; Jaskaran Malhotra; David Warner; ~~D'Arcy Short~~; Mark Chapman; ~~Hussain Talat~~; Mohammad Sami	Dwayne Bravo (c); Colin Munro; Brendon McCullum; Darren Bravo; Denesh Ramdin; Chris Lynn; ~~Shadab Khan~~; Khary Pierre; ~~Ronsford Beaton~~; Javon Searles; Kevon Cooper; Nikita Miller; Anderson Phillip; Hamza Tariq; Amir Jangoo; Shannon Gabriel; Fawad Ahmed; Ali Khan; ~~Junior Dala~~; Terrance Hinds; Colin Ingram

Shakib Al Hasan decided not to play in this edition, and he was replaced by Steve Smith

== Points table ==
Pos	Team	Pld	W	L	NR	Pts	NRR
1	Trinbago Knight Riders	10	7	3	0	14	0.823
2	Guyana Amazon Warriors	10	6	4	0	12	0.298
3	Jamaica Tallawahs	10	6	4	0	12	0.222
4	St Kitts & Nevis Patriots	10	5	4	1	11	0.250
5	St Lucia Stars	10	3	6	1	7	−1.098
6	Barbados Tridents	10	2	8	0	4	−0.711

- Top four teams advanced to the Playoffs
- advanced to the Qualifier 1
- advanced to the Eliminator

== League stage ==
All times are in the respective local times.

8 August 2018
20:00 (D/N)
Scorecard

(H) Trinbago Knight Riders; 195/6 (20 overs)	v	St Lucia Stars; 95 (17.3 overs)
Colin Munro 68 (48); Kieron Pollard 2/22 (3 overs)		Andre Fletcher 19 (11); Dwayne Bravo 3/11 (3 overs)

Trinbago Knight Riders won by 100 runs
Queen's Park Oval, Port of Spain
Umpires: Leslie Reifer (WI) and Joel Wilson (WI)
Player of the match: Colin Munro (Trinbago Knight Riders)

- St Lucia Stars won the toss and elected to field.

9 August 2018
18:00 (D/N)
Scorecard

St Kitts & Nevis Patriots; 146/5 (20 overs)	v	Guyana Amazon Warriors (H); 148/4 (16.3 overs)
Chris Gayle 86 (65); Keemo Paul 2/16 (4 overs)		Shimron Hetmyer 79* (45); Sandeep Lamichhane 2/12 (4 overs)

Guyana Amazon Warriors won by 6 wickets
Providence Stadium, Providence
Umpires: Gregory Brathwaite (WI) and Nigel Duguid (WI)
Player of the match: Shimron Hetmyer (Guyana Amazon Warriors)

- Guyana Amazon Warriors won the toss and elected to field.
- Sherfane Rutherford (Guyana Amazon Warriors) made his T20 debut.

10 August 2018
20:00 (D/N)
Scorecard

(H) Trinbago Knight Riders; 223/6 (20 overs)	v	Jamaica Tallawahs; 225/6 (19.3 overs)
Colin Munro 61 (42); Andre Russell 3/38 (3 overs)		Andre Russell 121* (49); Ali Khan 3/24 (4 overs)

Jamaica Tallawahs won by 4 wickets
Queen's Park Oval, Port of Spain
Umpires: Shaun George (SA) and Leslie Reifer (WI)
Player of the match: Andre Russell (Jamaica Tallawahs)

- Jamaica Tallawahs won the toss and elected to field.
- Andre Russell (Jamaica Tallawahs) scored the fastest century in the CPL and took a hat-trick.

11 August 2018
16:00 (D/N)
Scorecard

(H) Guyana Amazon Warriors; 141/4 (20 overs)	v	St Lucia Stars; 138/7 (20 overs)
Luke Ronchi 42 (41); Qais Ahmad 3/15 (4 overs)		Lendl Simmons 45 (39); Rayad Emrit 3/26 (4 overs)

Guyana Amazon Warriors won by 3 runs
Providence Stadium, Providence
Umpires: Nigel Duguid (WI) and Langton Rusere (Zim)
Player of the match: Rayad Emrit (Guyana Amazon Warriors)

- St Lucia Stars won the toss and elected to field.
- Kavem Hodge (St Lucia Stars) made his T20 debut.

11 August 2018
20:00 (D/N)
Scorecard

St Kitts & Nevis Patriots; 203/7 (20 overs)	v	Trinbago Knight Riders (H); 161/8 (20 overs)
Devon Thomas 58 (34); Ali Khan 3/23 (4 overs)		Kevon Cooper 42* (22); Carlos Brathwaite 2/19 (4 overs)

St Kitts and Nevis Patriots won by 42 runs
Queen's Park Oval, Port of Spain
Umpires: Shaun George (SA) and Joel Wilson (WI)
Player of the match: Devon Thomas (St Kitts and Nevis Patriots)

- Trinbago Knight Riders won the toss and elected to field.

12 August 2018
18:00 (D/N)
Scorecard

Barbados Tridents; 185/4 (20 overs)	v	Guyana Amazon Warriors (H); 155/8 (20 overs)
Shai Hope 88 (45); Imran Tahir 1/24 (4 overs)		Sherfane Rutherford 48 (46); Raymon Reifer 5/20 (4 overs)

Barbados Tridents won by 30 runs
Providence Stadium, Providence
Umpires: Gregory Brathwaite (WI) and Langton Rusere (Zim)
Player of the match: Raymon Reifer (Barbados Tridents)

- Guyana Amazon Warriors won the toss and elected to field.
- Shoaib Malik (Guyana Amazon Warriors) became the fourth batsman to score 8,000 runs in T20s.

14 August 2018
18:00 (D/N)
Scorecard

St Lucia Stars; 175 (20 overs)	v	Jamaica Tallawahs (H); 176/4 (19.4 overs)
Andre Fletcher 43 (33); Adam Zampa 3/27 (4 overs)		Glenn Phillips 58 (40); Kieron Pollard 1/22 (2.4 overs)

Jamaica Tallawahs won by 6 wickets
Sabina Park, Kingston
Umpires: Leslie Reifer (WI) and Joel Wilson (WI)
Player of the match: Adam Zampa (Jamaica Tallawahs)

- St Lucia Stars won the toss and elected to bat.

15 August 2018
18:00 (D/N)
Scorecard

(H) Jamaica Tallawahs; 178/4 (20 overs)	v	St Kitts & Nevis Patriots; 131/9 (20 overs)
Ross Taylor 51* (35); Sandeep Lamichhane 2/21 (4 overs)		Chris Gayle 24 (25); Krishmar Santokie 2/13 (4 overs)

Jamaica Tallawahs won by 47 runs
Sabina Park, Kingston
Umpires: Shaun George (SA) and Leslie Reifer (WI)
Player of the match: Kennar Lewis (Jamaica Tallawahs)

- St Kitts and Nevis Patriots won the toss and elected to field.

16 August 2018
20:00 (D/N)
Scorecard

(H) St Lucia Stars; 212/2 (20 overs)	v	Trinbago Knight Riders; 218/5 (19.5 overs)
David Warner 72* (55); Shannon Gabriel 1/28 (2 overs)		Darren Bravo 94* (36); Mitchell McClenaghan 2/21 (3 overs)

Trinbago Knight Riders won by 5 wickets
Daren Sammy Cricket Ground, Gros Islet
Umpires: Gregory Brathwaite (WI) and Nigel Duguid (WI)
Player of the match: Darren Bravo (Trinbago Knight Riders)

- Trinbago Knight Riders won the toss and elected to field.
- Chandrapaul Hemraj (St Lucia Stars) made his T20 debut.

17 August 2018
21:00 (D/N)
Scorecard

(H) St Lucia Stars; 226/6 (20 overs)	v	Barbados Tridents; 188/6 (20 overs)
Kieron Pollard 104 (54); Wahab Riaz 3/35 (4 overs)		Dwayne Smith 58 (45); Obed McCoy 3/28 (4 overs)

St Lucia Stars won by 38 runs
Daren Sammy Cricket Ground, Gros Islet
Umpires: Nigel Duguid (WI) and Langton Rusere (Zim)
Player of the match: Kieron Pollard (St Lucia Stars)

- Barbados Tridents won the toss and elected to field.
- Kieron Pollard (St Lucia Stars) scored his first century in T20s.
- St Lucia Stars scored the highest total by any team in a CPL match.

18 August 2018
20:00 (D/N)
Scorecard

Guyana Amazon Warriors; 209/7 (20 overs)	v	Jamaica Tallawahs (H); 138 (16.2 overs)
Shimron Hetmyer 100 (49); Andre Russell 2/31 (3 overs)		Glenn Phillips 43 (29); Chris Green 2/19 (4 overs)

Guyana Amazon Warriors won by 71 runs
Central Broward Regional Park, Lauderhill
Umpires: Shaun George (SA) and Jermaine Lindo (USA)
Player of the match: Shimron Hetmyer (Guyana Amazon Warriors)

- Guyana Amazon Warriors won the toss and elected to bat.
- Shimron Hetmyer (Guyana Amazon Warriors) became the youngest batsman to score a century in the CPL.

19 August 2018
18:00 (D/N)
Scorecard

(H) Jamaica Tallawahs; 182/5 (20 overs)	v	Trinbago Knight Riders; 184/6 (20 overs)
Glenn Phillips 80 (55); Khary Pierre 2/19 (4 overs)		Colin Munro 67 (51); Imad Wasim 2/17 (4 overs)

Trinbago Knight Riders won by 4 wickets
Central Broward Regional Park, Lauderhill
Umpires: Sameer Bandekar (USA) and Joel Wilson (WI)
Player of the match: Khary Pierre (Trinbago Knight Riders)

- Trinbago Knight Riders won the toss and elected to field.

21 August 2018
18:00 (D/N)
Scorecard

(H) St Lucia Stars; 69 (12.3 overs)	v	St Kitts & Nevis Patriots; 70/3 (7.4 overs)
Qais Ahmad 24 (18); Sheldon Cottrell 3/14 (2.3 overs)		Devon Thomas 38* (21); Kavem Hodge 1/1 (1 over)

St Kitts and Nevis Patriots won by 7 wickets
Daren Sammy Cricket Ground, Gros Islet
Umpires: Gregory Brathwaite (WI) and Langton Rusere (Zim)
Player of the match: Sheldon Cottrell (St Kitts and Nevis Patriots)

- St Kitts and Nevis Patriots won the toss and elected to field.
- The St Lucia Stars' innings was the shortest in the CPL.

22 August 2018
18:00 (D/N)
Scorecard

Barbados Tridents; 156/6 (20 overs)	v	Jamaica Tallawahs (H); 154/3 (20 overs)
Steve Smith 63 (44); Andre Russell 2/32 (4 overs)		Johnson Charles 42 (32); Steve Smith 2/19 (3 overs)

Barbados Tridents won by 2 runs
Central Broward Regional Park, Lauderhill
Umpires: Shaun George (SA) and Leslie Reifer (WI)
Player of the match: Steve Smith (Barbados Tridents)

- Jamaica Tallawahs won the toss and elected to field.

24 August 2018
21:00 (D/N)
Scorecard

Guyana Amazon Warriors; 140/9 (20 overs)	v	St Lucia Stars (H); 141/4 (18.1 overs)
Cameron Delport 25 (33); Obed McCoy 2/23 (4 overs)		Andre Fletcher 45* (46); Veerasammy Permaul 2/20 (4 overs)

St Lucia Stars won by 6 wickets
Daren Sammy Cricket Ground, Gros Islet
Umpires: Gregory Brathwaite (WI) and Nigel Duguid (WI)
Player of the match: Andre Fletcher (St Lucia Stars)

- St Lucia Stars won the toss and elected to field.

25 August 2018
16:00 (D/N)
Scorecard

(H) Barbados Tridents; 147/6 (20 overs)	v	St Kitts & Nevis Patriots; 148/4 (18.5 overs)
Jason Holder 54 (35); Ben Cutting 2/18 (4 overs)		Brandon King 60 (49); Mohammad Irfan 2/1 (4 overs)

St Kitts and Nevis Patriots won by 6 wickets
Kensington Oval, Bridgetown
Umpires: Shaun George (SA) and Patrick Gustard (WI)
Player of the match: Mohammad Irfan (Barbados Tridents)

- St Kitts and Nevis Patriots won the toss and elected to field.
- Mohammad Irfan (Barbados Tridents) conceded just 1 run from 4 overs, including 23 dot balls, and was the most economical four-over spell in T20 cricket.

25 August 2018
20:00 (D/N)
Scorecard

Jamaica Tallawahs; 204/5 (20 overs)	v	St Lucia Stars (H); 183/8 (20 overs)
Rovman Powell 64 (37); Kesrick Williams 3/34 (4 overs)		Kieron Pollard 46 (27); Andre Russell 2/15 (3 overs)

Jamaica Tallawahs won by 21 runs
Daren Sammy Cricket Ground, Gros Islet
Umpires: Nigel Duguid (WI) and Langton Rusere (Zim)
Player of the match: Rovman Powell (Jamaica Tallawahs)

- Jamaica Tallawahs won the toss and elected to bat.

26 August 2018
18:00 (D/N)
Scorecard

(H) Barbados Tridents; 128/8 (20 overs)	v	Trinbago Knight Riders; 130/6 (16.3 overs)
Shai Hope 42 (34); Fawad Ahmed 2/13 (4 overs)		Brendon McCullum 66 (42); Mohammad Irfan 2/24 (4 overs)

Trinbago Knight Riders won by 4 wickets
Kensington Oval, Bridgetown
Umpires: Patrick Gustard (WI) and Leslie Reifer (WI)
Player of the match: Brendon McCullum (Trinbago Knight Riders)

- Barbados Tridents won the toss and elected to bat.

28 August 2018
18:00 (D/N)
Scorecard

(H) St Kitts & Nevis Patriots; 168/7 (20 overs)	v	Guyana Amazon Warriors; 169/6 (20 overs)
Chris Gayle 40 (27); Imran Tahir 4/22 (4 overs)		Sohail Tanvir 37* (20); Carlos Brathwaite 2/23 (4 overs)

Guyana Amazon Warriors won by 4 wickets
Warner Park Sporting Complex, Basseterre
Umpires: Gregory Brathwaite (WI) and Langton Rusere (Zim)
Player of the match: Sohail Tanvir (Guyana Amazon Warriors)

- Guyana Amazon Warriors won the toss and elected to field.
- Hayden Walsh Jr. (St Kitts and Nevis Patriots) made his T20 debut.

29 August 2018
20:00 (D/N)
Scorecard

(H) Barbados Tridents; 151/9 (20 overs)	v	Jamaica Tallawahs; 153/5 (17.2 overs)
Martin Guptill 73 (60); Oshane Thomas 2/22 (4 overs)		Johnson Charles 53 (33); Wahab Riaz 2/27 (3.2 overs)

Jamaica Tallawahs won by 5 wickets
Kensington Oval, Bridgetown
Umpires: Shaun George (SA) and Leslie Reifer (WI)
Player of the match: Johnson Charles (Jamaica Tallawahs)

- Jamaica Tallawahs won the toss and elected to field
- Chemar Holder (Barbados Tridents) made his T20 debut.

30 August 2018
18:00 (D/N)
Scorecard

(H) St Kitts & Nevis Patriots	v	St Lucia Stars

Match abandoned
Warner Park Sporting Complex, Basseterre
Umpires: Gregory Brathwaite (WI) and Nigel Duguid (WI)

- No toss.
- No play was possible due to rain.

31 August 2018
20:00 (D/N)
Scorecard

(H) Barbados Tridents; 165/7 (20 overs)	v	Guyana Amazon Warriors; 168/2 (16.4 overs)
Nicholas Pooran 46 (27); Imran Tahir 2/21 (4 overs)		Luke Ronchi 67* (40); Wahab Riaz 1/26 (3 overs)

Guyana Amazon Warriors won by 8 wickets
Kensington Oval, Bridgetown
Umpires: Shaun George (SA) and Patrick Gustard (WI)
Player of the match: Luke Ronchi (Guyana Amazon Warriors)

- Guyana Amazon Warriors won the toss and elected to field.

1 September 2018
18:00 (D/N)
Scorecard

Trinbago Knight Riders; 199/4 (20 overs)	v	St Kitts & Nevis Patriots (H); 153/8 (20 overs)
Colin Munro 76* (50); Alzarri Joseph 2/43 (4 overs)		Evin Lewis 52 (37); Anderson Phillip 3/40 (4 overs)

Trinbago Knight Riders won by 46 runs
Warner Park Sporting Complex, Basseterre
Umpires: Nigel Duguid (WI) and Langton Rusere (Zim)
Player of the match: Colin Munro (Trinbago Knight Riders)

- St Kitts and Nevis Patriots won the toss and elected to field.

2 September 2018
14:00
Scorecard

(H) Barbados Tridents; 135/7 (20 overs)	v	St Lucia Stars; 136/4 (17.3 overs)
Hashim Amla 35 (34); Christopher Lamont 2/21 (4 overs)		David Warner 42* (45); Mohammad Irfan 2/22 (4 overs)

St Lucia Stars won by 6 wickets
Kensington Oval, Bridgetown
Umpires: Patrick Gustard (WI) and Leslie Reifer (WI)
Player of the match: Christopher Lamont (St Lucia Stars)

- St Lucia Stars won the toss and elected to field.
- Christopher Lamont (St Lucia Stars) made his T20 debut.

2 September 2018
18:00 (D/N)
Scorecard

Jamaica Tallawahs; 206/6 (20 overs)	v	St Kitts & Nevis Patriots (H); 118/3 (10.1 overs)
Rovman Powell 84 (40); Ben Cutting 2/29 (4 overs)		Rassie van der Dussen 45* (24); Adam Zampa 1/18 (2 overs)

St Kitts and Nevis Patriots won by 7 wickets (D/L method)
Warner Park Sporting Complex, Basseterre
Umpires: Gregory Brathwaite (WI) and Langton Rusere (Zim)
Player of the match: Rassie van der Dussen (St Kitts and Nevis Patriots)

- St Kitts and Nevis Patriots won the toss and elected to field.

4 September 2018
18:00 (D/N)
Scorecard

Barbados Tridents; 168/5 (20 overs)	v	St Kitts & Nevis Patriots (H); 169/8 (19.4 overs)
Nicholas Pooran 44 (32); Tabraiz Shamsi 2/16 (4 overs)		Fabian Allen 64* (34); Mohammad Irfan 3/37 (4 overs)

St Kitts and Nevis Patriots won by 2 wickets
Warner Park Sporting Complex, Basseterre
Umpires: Gregory Brathwaite (WI) and Nigel Duguid (WI)
Player of the match: Fabian Allen (St Kitts and Nevis Patriots)

- St Kitts and Nevis Patriots won the toss and elected to field.
- Dominic Drakes (Barbados Tridents) made his T20 debut.

5 September 2018
20:00 (D/N)
Scorecard

(H) Trinbago Knight Riders; 170/7 (20 overs)	v	Guyana Amazon Warriors; 103 (17.4 overs)
Colin Munro 90 (56); Sohail Tanvir 3/27 (4 overs)		Roshon Primus 36* (30); Ali Khan 3/22 (2.4 overs)

Trinbago Knight Riders won by 67 runs
Queen's Park Oval, Port of Spain
Umpires: Shaun George (SA) and Leslie Reifer (WI)
Player of the match: Colin Munro (Trinbago Knight Riders)

- Guyana Amazon Warriors won the toss and elected to field.
- Romario Shepherd (Guyana Amazon Warriors) made his T20 debut.

7 September 2018
20:00 (D/N)
Scorecard

(H) Trinbago Knight Riders; 180/5 (20 overs)	v	Barbados Tridents; 171/5 (20 overs)
Denesh Ramdin 51 (31); Imran Khan 2/25 (4 overs)		Nicholas Pooran 44 (32); Fawad Ahmed 3/28 (4 overs)

Trinbago Knight Riders won by 9 runs
Queen's Park Oval, Port of Spain
Umpires: Shaun George (SA) and Patrick Gustard (WI)
Player of the match: Fawad Ahmed (Trinbago Knight Riders)

- Barbados Tridents won the toss and elected to field.
- Terrance Hinds (Trinbago Knight Riders) made his T20 debut.

8 September 2018
20:00 (D/N)
Scorecard

(H) Guyana Amazon Warriors; 173/6 (20 overs)	v	Jamaica Tallawahs; 177/2 (18.1 overs)
Jason Mohammed 54 (33); Rovman Powell 2/21 (2 overs)		Ross Taylor 60* (41); Imran Tahir 2/30 (4 overs)

Jamaica Tallawahs won by 8 wickets
Providence Stadium, Providence
Umpires: Nigel Duguid (WI) and Langton Rusere (Zim)
Player of the match: Rovman Powell (Jamaica Tallawahs)

- Jamaica Tallawahs won the toss and elected to field.

9 September 2018
18:00 (D/N)
Scorecard

Trinbago Knight Riders; 154/7 (20 overs)	v	Guyana Amazon Warriors (H); 158/4 (14.1 overs)
Darren Bravo 42* (34); Rayad Emrit 2/25 (4 overs)		Shimron Hetmyer 59 (30); Fawad Ahmed 2/20 (3 overs)

Guyana Amazon Warriors won by 6 wickets
Providence Stadium, Providence
Umpires: Gregory Brathwaite (WI) and Langton Rusere (Zim)
Player of the match: Sherfane Rutherford (Guyana Amazon Warriors)

- Guyana Amazon Warriors won the toss and elected to field.

== Playoffs ==
All times are in the respective local time

=== Bracket ===
Qualifier 1/Eliminator
1	Trinbago Knight Riders	122/7 (20 overs)
2	Guyana Amazon Warriors	126/8 (19.5 overs)
3	Jamaica Tallawahs	191/5 (20 overs)
4	St Kitts & Nevis Patriots	193/8 (19.5 overs)

Qualifier 2
1	Trinbago Knight Riders	165/6 (20 overs)
4	St Kitts & Nevis Patriots	145/8 (20 overs)

Final
2	Guyana Amazon Warriors	147/9 (20 overs)
1	Trinbago Knight Riders	150/2 (17.3 overs)

=== Qualifier 1 ===
11 September 2018
18:00 (D/N)
Scorecard

Trinbago Knight Riders; 122/7 (20 overs)	v	Guyana Amazon Warriors; 126/8 (19.5 overs)
Colin Ingram 25 (26); Chris Green 2/8 (4 overs)		Shimron Hetmyer 39 (36); Khary Pierre 2/18 (4 overs)

Guyana Amazon Warriors won by 2 wickets
Providence Stadium, Providence
Umpires: Leslie Reifer (WI) and Langton Rusere (Zim)
Player of the match: Shimron Hetmyer (Guyana Amazon Warriors)

- Guyana Amazon Warriors won the toss and elected to field.

=== Eliminator ===
12 September 2018
18:00 (D/N)
Scorecard

Jamaica Tallawahs; 191/5 (20 overs)	v	St Kitts & Nevis Patriots; 193/8 (19.5 overs)
Glenn Phillips 103 (63); Ben Cutting 2/45 (3 overs)		Anton Devcich 50 (23); Ish Sodhi 3/36 (4 overs)

St Kitts and Nevis Patriots won by 2 wickets
Providence Stadium, Providence
Umpires: Nigel Duguid (WI) and Langton Rusere (Zim)
Player of the match: Anton Devcich (St Kitts and Nevis Patriots)

- St Kitts and Nevis Patriots won the toss and elected to field.

=== Qualifier 2 ===
14 September 2018
20:00 (D/N)
Scorecard

Trinbago Knight Riders; 165/6 (20 overs)	v	St Kitts & Nevis Patriots; 145/8 (20 overs)
Brendon McCullum 43 (26); Sheldon Cottrell 2/24 (4 overs)		Devon Thomas 35 (26); Fawad Ahmed 3/13 (4 overs)

Trinbago Knight Riders won by 20 runs
Brian Lara Cricket Academy, Tarouba
Umpires: Nigel Duguid (WI) and Leslie Reifer (WI)
Player of the match: Fawad Ahmed (Trinbago Knight Riders)

- St Kitts and Nevis Patriots won the toss and elected to field.

=== Final ===
16 September 2018
17:00 (D/N)
Scorecard

Guyana Amazon Warriors; 147/9 (20 overs)	v	Trinbago Knight Riders; 150/2 (17.3 over)
Luke Ronchi 44 (35); Khary Pierre 3/29 (4 overs)		Colin Munro 68* (39); Romario Shepherd 1/29 (3 overs)

Trinbago Knight Riders won by 8 wickets
Brian Lara Cricket Academy, Tarouba
Umpires: Leslie Reifer (WI) and Langton Rusere (Zim)
Player of the match: Khary Pierre (Trinbago Knight Riders)

- Trinbago Knight Riders won the toss and elected to field.

== Statistics ==
=== Most runs ===
Player	Team	Matches	Runs	High score
Colin Munro	Trinbago Knight Riders	13	567	90
Glenn Phillips	Jamaica Tallawahs	11	457	103
Shimron Hetmyer	Guyana Amazon Warriors	12	440	100
Darren Bravo	Trinbago Knight Riders	13	349	94 not out
Brendon McCullum	Trinbago Knight Riders	13	343	68

- Source: Cricinfo

=== Most wickets ===
Player	Team	Matches	Wickets	Best bowling
Fawad Ahmed	Trinbago Knight Riders	13	22	3/13
Oshane Thomas	Jamaica Tallawahs	10	18	3/39
Imran Tahir	Guyana Amazon Warriors	12	16	4/22
Ali Khan	Trinbago Knight Riders	12	16	3/22
Andre Russell	Jamaica Tallawahs	11	14	3/38

- Source: Cricinfo
