= Irish cricket team in the West Indies in 2019–20 =

International cricket tour

	West Indies	Ireland
- Dates: 4 – 19 January 2020
Captains	Kieron Pollard	Andrew Balbirnie

One Day International series
- Results: West Indies won the 3-match series 3–0
Most runs	Evin Lewis (208)	Andrew Balbirnie (97)
Most wickets	Alzarri Joseph (8)	Simi Singh (6)
- Player of the series: Evin Lewis (WI)

Twenty20 International series
- Results: 3-match series drawn 1–1
Most runs	Lendl Simmons (123)	Paul Stirling (123)
Most wickets	Kieron Pollard (7)	Josh Little (3)
- Player of the series: Kieron Pollard (WI)

The Ireland cricket team toured the West Indies in January 2020 to play three One Day International (ODI) and three Twenty20 International (T20I) matches. The West Indies Cricket Board announced the tour dates in September 2019. In November 2019, Andrew Balbirnie was named as Ireland's captain across all three formats of international cricket.

Ahead of the first ODI match, the International Cricket Council (ICC) announced the use of technology to monitor front-foot no-balls for all matches during the tour. The third umpire called the front-foot no-balls, communicating this with the on-field umpires. It was used as a trial to see if it can be implemented further, without a detriment to the flow of the game. The trial was previously used in December 2019, in the matches between India and the West Indies.

The West Indies won the first two ODIs to take an unassailable lead in the series. The West Indies won the third ODI by five wickets, winning the series 3–0. It was the West Indies first ODI series win at home since beating Bangladesh in August 2014. For the first T20I, Jacqueline Williams was named as the third umpire, becoming the first woman to officiate as a third umpire in a men's international cricket match. The T20I series was drawn 1–1, after the second match finished in a no result due to rain.

== Squads ==
ODIs		T20Is	
West Indies	Ireland	West Indies	Ireland
Kieron Pollard (c); Sunil Ambris; Roston Chase; Sheldon Cottrell; Shimron Hetmyer; Shai Hope; Alzarri Joseph; Brandon King; Evin Lewis; Keemo Paul; Khary Pierre; Nicholas Pooran; Romario Shepherd; Hayden Walsh Jr.	Andrew Balbirnie (c); Mark Adair; Gareth Delany; Andy McBrine; Barry McCarthy; James McCollum; Kevin O'Brien; William Porterfield; Boyd Rankin; Simi Singh; Paul Stirling; Lorcan Tucker; Gary Wilson; Craig Young	Kieron Pollard (c); Dwayne Bravo; Sheldon Cottrell; Shimron Hetmyer; Brandon King; Evin Lewis; Khary Pierre; Nicholas Pooran; Rovman Powell; Sherfane Rutherford; Romario Shepherd; Lendl Simmons; Hayden Walsh Jr.; Kesrick Williams	Andrew Balbirnie (c); Mark Adair; Gareth Delany; George Dockrell; Josh Little; Barry McCarthy; Kevin O'Brien; Boyd Rankin; Simi Singh; Paul Stirling; Harry Tector; Lorcan Tucker; Gary Wilson; Craig Young

Oshane Thomas and Obed McCoy also travelled with the West Indies team for the ODI matches, as part of a development initiative with Cricket West Indies.

== Tour match ==
=== 50-over match: West Indies President's XI vs Ireland ===
4 January 2020
09:00
Scorecard

Ireland; 275/9 (50 overs)	v	West Indies President's XI; 278/7 (46.4 overs)
Gareth Delany 60 (78); Yannick Ottley 3/46 (10 overs)		Darren Bravo 70 (62); Kevin O'Brien 2/23 (4 overs)

West Indies President's XI won by 3 wickets
Three Ws Oval, Cave Hill
Umpires: Jonathan Blades (WI) and Gregory Brathwaite (WI)

- West Indies President's XI won the toss and elected to field.

== ODI series ==
=== 1st ODI ===
7 January 2020
13:30 (D/N)
Scorecard

Ireland; 180 (46.1 overs)	v	West Indies; 184/5 (33.2 overs)
Lorcan Tucker 31 (68); Alzarri Joseph 4/32 (10 overs)		Evin Lewis 99* (99); Simi Singh 2/44 (10 overs)

West Indies won by 5 wickets
Kensington Oval, Bridgetown
Umpires: Ruchira Palliyaguruge (SL) and Joel Wilson (WI)
Player of the match: Alzarri Joseph (WI)

- Ireland won the toss and elected to bat.
- Gareth Delany (Ire) made his ODI debut.
- Andrew Balbirnie captained Ireland for the first time in ODIs.
- Boyd Rankin played in his 150th international match for Ireland.

=== 2nd ODI ===
9 January 2020
13:30 (D/N)
Scorecard

Ireland; 237/9 (50 overs)	v	West Indies; 242/9 (49.5 overs)
Paul Stirling 63 (79); Alzarri Joseph 4/32 (10 overs)		Nicholas Pooran 52 (44); Simi Singh 3/48 (10 overs)

West Indies won by 1 wicket
Kensington Oval, Bridgetown
Umpires: Richard Illingworth (Eng) and Joel Wilson (WI)
Player of the match: Alzarri Joseph (WI)

- Ireland won the toss and elected to bat.
- William Porterfield played in his 300th international match for Ireland.

=== 3rd ODI ===
12 January 2020
09:00
Scorecard

Ireland; 203 (49.1 overs)	v	West Indies; 199/5 (36.2 overs)
Andrew Balbirnie 71 (93); Hayden Walsh Jr. 4/36 (10 overs)		Evin Lewis 102 (97); Andy McBrine 2/50 (10 overs)

West Indies won by 5 wickets (DLS method)
National Cricket Stadium, St. George's
Umpires: Gregory Brathwaite (WI) and Ruchira Palliyaguruge (SL)
Player of the match: Evin Lewis (WI)

- West Indies won the toss and elected to field.
- West Indies were set a revised target of 197 runs from 47 overs due to rain.

== T20I series ==
=== 1st T20I ===
15 January 2020
13:00
Scorecard

Ireland; 208/7 (20 overs)	v	West Indies; 204/7 (20 overs)
Paul Stirling 95 (47); Dwayne Bravo 2/28 (4 overs)		Evin Lewis 53 (29); Josh Little 3/29 (4 overs)

Ireland won by 4 runs
National Cricket Stadium, St. George's
Umpires: Gregory Brathwaite (WI) and Patrick Gustard (WI)
Player of the match: Paul Stirling (Ire)

- Ireland won the toss and elected to bat.
- Andrew Balbirnie captained Ireland for the first time in T20Is.
- Paul Stirling and Kevin O'Brien made the highest partnership for any wicket for Ireland in T20Is (154).
- Paul Stirling (Ire) scored his 2,000th run in T20Is.

=== 2nd T20I ===
18 January 2020
18:00 (D/N)
Scorecard

Ireland; 147/9 (19 overs)	v	West Indies; 16/1 (2.2 overs)
Gareth Delany 44 (22); Kieron Pollard 4/25 (4 overs)		Lendl Simmons 10 (5); Paul Stirling 1/11 (1 over)

No result
Warner Park, Basseterre
Umpires: Gregory Brathwaite (WI) and Patrick Gustard (WI)

- West Indies won the toss and elected to field.
- Rain during West Indies' innings prevented any further play.
- Romario Shepherd (WI) made his T20I debut.

=== 3rd T20I ===
19 January 2020
18:00 (D/N)
Scorecard

Ireland; 138 (19.1 overs)	v	West Indies; 140/1 (11 overs)
Kevin O'Brien 36 (18); Kieron Pollard 3/17 (4 overs)		Lendl Simmons 91* (40); Simi Singh 1/41 (3 overs)

West Indies won by 9 wickets
Warner Park, Basseterre
Umpires: Gregory Brathwaite (WI) and Patrick Gustard (WI)
Player of the match: Lendl Simmons (WI)

- West Indies won the toss and elected to field.
