= India A cricket team in the West Indies in 2019 =

	West Indies A	India A
- Dates: 11 July – 9 August 2019
Captains	Roston Chase (LAs); Shamarh Brooks (1st FC), Kraigg Brathwaite (2nd FC) and Jahmar Hamilton (3rd FC)	Manish Pandey (LAs); Hanuma Vihari (FCs)

FC series
- Result: India A won the 3-match series 2–0
Most runs	Sunil Ambris (195)	Shubman Gill (244)
Most wickets	Chemar Holder (15)	Shahbaz Nadeem (15)

LA series
- Result: India A won the 5-match series 4–1
Most runs	Sunil Ambris (161)	Shubman Gill (218)
Most wickets	Romario Shepherd (7)	Khaleel Ahmed (9)

The India A cricket team toured West Indies from July till August 2019 to play three First-class matches and 5 List-A matches.

India A won the List-A (unofficial ODI) series by a 4–1 margin. They also won the First-class (unofficial Test) series by 2–0.

== List-A series ==
=== 1st Unofficial ODI ===
11 July 2019
09:30
Scorecard

India A 190 (48.5 overs)	v	(Cricket West Indies) West Indies A 125 (35.5 overs)
Shreyas Iyer 77 (107); Roston Chase 4/19 (6.5 overs)		Rovman Powell 41 (40); Khaleel Ahmed 3/16 (8 overs)

India A won by 65 runs
Coolidge Cricket Ground, Antigua
Umpires: Nigel Duguid and Gregory Brathwaite
Player of the match: Shreyas Iyer (India A)

- India A won the toss and elected to bat.

=== 2nd Unofficial ODI ===
14 July 2019
09:30
Scorecard

India A 255/8 (50 overs)	v	(Cricket West Indies) West Indies A 190 (43.5 overs)
Ruturaj Gaikwad 85 (102); Romario Shepherd 4/36 (10 overs)		Raymon Reifer 71 (105); Navdeep Saini 5/46 (8.5 overs)

India A won by 65 runs
Sir Vivian Richards Stadium, Antigua
Umpires: Patrick Gustard and Gregory Brathwaite
Player of the match: Ruturaj Gaikwad (India A)

- West Indies A won the toss and elected to field.
- Navdeep Saini (IND A) took his first five-wicket haul in List-A.

=== 3rd Unofficial ODI ===
16 July 2019
09:30
Scorecard

India A 295/6 (50 overs)	v	(Cricket West Indies) West Indies A 147 (34.2 overs)
Manish Pandey 100 (87); Rahkeem Cornwall 2/37 (10 overs)		Keemo Paul 34 (16); Krunal Pandya 5/25 (7 overs)

India A won by 148 runs
Sir Vivian Richards Stadium, Antigua
Umpires: Nigel Duguid and Patrick Gustard
Player of the match: Manish Pandey (India A)

- India A won the toss and elected to bat.
- Krunal Pandya (IND A) took his second-highest bowling figures in List-A.

=== 4th Unofficial ODI ===
19 July 2019
09:30
Scorecard

West Indies A (Cricket West Indies); 298/9 (50 overs)	v	India A 293/9 (50 overs)
Roston Chase 84 (100); Khaleel Ahmed 4/67 (10 overs)		Axar Patel 81* (63); Rovman Powell 2/47 (7 overs)

West Indies A won by 5 runs
Coolidge Cricket Ground, Antigua
Umpires: Nigel Duguid and Gregory Brathwaite
Player of the match: Roston Chase (West Indies A)

- India A won the toss and elected to field.

=== 5th Unofficial ODI ===
21 July 2019
09:30
Scorecard

West Indies A (Cricket West Indies); 236 (47.4 overs)	v	India A 237/2 (33 overs)
Sherfane Rutherford 65 (70); Navdeep Saini 2/31 (8 overs)		Ruturaj Gaikwad 99 (89); Keemo Paul 1/37 (5 overs)

India A won by 8 wickets
Coolidge Cricket Ground, Antigua
Umpires: Jonathan Blades and Gregory Brathwaite
Player of the match: Ruturaj Gaikwad (India A)

- West Indies A won the toss and elected to bat.

== First-Class series ==
=== 1st Unofficial Test ===
24–27 July 2019
Scorecard

West Indies A (Cricket West Indies)	v	India A
228 (66.5 overs); Rakheem Cornwall 59 (100); Shahbaz Nadeem 5/62 (22 overs)		312 (104.3 overs); Shivam Dube 71 (108); Miguel Cummins 4/40 (22.3 overs)
180 (77 overs); Shamarh Brooks 53 (124); Shahbaz Nadeem 5/47 (21 overs)		97/4 (30 overs); KS Bharat 28 (40); Rakheem Cornwall 2/18 (12 overs)

India A won by 6 wickets
Sir Vivian Richards Stadium, Antigua
Umpires: Jonathan Blades and Deighton Butler
Player of the match: Shahbaz Nadeem (India A)

- West Indies A won the toss and elected to bat.

=== 2nd Unofficial Test ===
31 July - 3 August 2019
Scorecard

West Indies A (Cricket West Indies)	v	India A
318 (113 overs); Montcin Hodge 65 (190); Mohammed Siraj 3/63 (27 overs)		190 (47 overs); Shivam Dube 79 (85); Chemar Holder 5/54 (13 overs)
149 (39.5 overs); Sunil Ambris 71 (93); Krishnappa Gowtham 5/17 (17.5 overs)		178/3 (79.1 overs); Mayank Agarwal 81 (134); Chemar Holder 2/51 (21 overs)

India A won by 7 wickets
Queen's Park Oval, Port of Spain
Umpires: Deighton Butler and Zahid Bassarath
Player of the match: Priyank Panchal (India A)

- West Indies A won the toss and elected to bat.

=== 3rd Unofficial Test ===
6–9 August 2019
Scorecard

India A	v	(Cricket West Indies) West Indies A
201 (67.5 overs); Wriddhiman Saha 62 (66); Chemar Holder 3/47 (16 overs)		194 (72.4 overs); Jeremy Solozano 69 (208); Krishnappa Gowtham 6/67 (23.4 overs)
365/4d (90 overs); Shubman Gill 204* (248); Chemar Holder 2/88 (22 overs)		314/6 (109 overs); Jeremy Solozano 92 (251); Shahbaz Nadeem 5/103 (41 overs)

Match drawn
Brian Lara Cricket Academy, Trinidad and Tobago
Umpires: Danesh Ramdhanie and Zahid Bassarath
Player of the match: Hanuma Vihari (India A)

- West Indies A won the toss and elected to field.
- Shubman Gill became the youngest cricketer to score a first-class double century for an Indian representative side.
