= 2016 Caribbean Premier League =

Fourth season of the Caribbean Premier League

- Dates: 29 June 2016 – 7 August 2016
- Administrator: CPL Limited
- Cricket format: Twenty20
- Tournament format(s): Group stage and knockout
- Champions: Jamaica Tallawahs (2nd title)
- Runners-up: Guyana Amazon Warriors
- Participants: 6
- Matches: 34
- Attendance: 344,876 (10,143 per match)
- Player of the series: Andre Russell (Jamaica Tallawahs)
- Most runs: Chris Lynn (Guyana Amazon Warriors) (454)
- Most wickets: Dwayne Bravo (Trinbago Knight Riders) (21)
- Official website: cplt20.com

The 2016 Caribbean Premier League (CPLT20) or for sponsorship reasons, Hero CPL 2016 was the fourth season of the Caribbean Premier League, the domestic Twenty20 cricket league in the West Indies. The league began on 29 June and ended on 7 August. Matches were played in seven countries – Trinidad and Tobago, Saint Kitts and Nevis, Guyana, Barbados, Jamaica, Saint Lucia, and the United States. The United States have hosted fixtures for the first time, with six matches played at the Central Broward Regional Park in Lauderhill, Florida. The competition's finals was played at Warner Park, Basseterre, St.Kitts and Nevis.

== Teams and standings ==
Pos	Team	Pld	W	L	NR	Pts	NRR
1	Guyana Amazon Warriors	10	7	3	0	14	0.120
2	Jamaica Tallawahs	10	6	3	1	13	0.704
3	St Lucia Stars	10	6	4	0	12	0.336
4	Trinbago Knight Riders	10	5	5	0	10	−0.065
5	Barbados Tridents	10	3	6	1	7	−0.267
6	St Kitts & Nevis Patriots	10	2	8	0	4	−0.772

- the top four teams advanced to the Playoffs
- advanced to the Qualifier 1
- advanced to the Qualifier 2

== Fixtures ==
29 June
21:00 (D/N)
Scorecard

(home team) Trinbago Knight Riders; 162/6 (20 overs)	v	St Lucia Zouks; 164/4 (19.1 overs)
Darren Bravo 63* (44); Shane Watson 3/26 (4 overs)		Johnson Charles 52 (38); Sunil Narine 2/25 (4 overs)

St Lucia Zouks won by 6 wickets
Queen's Park Oval, Port of Spain, Trinidad
Umpires: Zahid Bassarath (WI) and Patrick Gustard (WI)
Player of the match: Johnson Charles (St Lucia Zouks)

- St Lucia Zouks won the toss and elected to field.
- Darren Bravo scored his 2000th T20 run

30 June
20:00 (D/N)
Scorecard

(home team) St Kitts & Nevis Patriots; 164/9 (20 overs)	v	Guyana Amazon Warriors; 165/6 (19.5 overs)
Devon Thomas 38 (17); Sohail Tanvir 4/20 (4 overs)		Dwayne Smith 62 (36); Carlos Brathwaite 2/35 (4 overs)

Guyana Amazon Warriors won by 4 wickets
Warner Park, Basseterre, St Kitts
Umpires: Leslie Reifer (WI) and John Ward (Aus)
Player of the match: Dwayne Smith (Guyana Amazon Warriors)

- Guyana Amazon Warriors won the toss and elected to field.
- Brad Hodge scored his 7000th T20 run and Dwayne Smith scored his 6000th
- Anthony Bramble (Guyana Amazon Warriors) made his T20 debut.

1 July
21:00 (D/N)
Scorecard

(home team) Trinbago Knight Riders; 170/5 (20 overs)	v	Barbados Tridents; 159/8 (20 overs)
Hashim Amla 81 (54); Akeal Hosein 2/18 (4 overs)		Steven Taylor 37 (37); Sunil Narine 2/21 (4 overs)

Trinbago Knight Riders won by 11 runs
Queen's Park Oval, Port of Spain, Trinidad
Umpires: Zahid Bassarath (WI) and Johan Cloete (SA)
Player of the match: Hashim Amla (Trinbago Knight Riders)

- Barbados Tridents won the toss and elected to field
- Shoaib Malik scored his 6000th T20 run
- Hashim Amla and Dwayne Bravo scored 150 runs for the fifth wicket for the Trinbago Knight Riders, a record in T20 cricket

2 July
12:00
Scorecard

Jamaica Tallawahs; 153/7 (20 overs)	v	St Kitts & Nevis Patriots (home team); 148/7 (20 overs)
Chris Gayle 51 (36); Tabraiz Shamsi 2/17 (4 overs)		Lendl Simmons 29 (29); Kesrick Williams 3/23 (4 overs)

Jamaica Tallawahs won by 5 runs
Warner Park, Basseterre, St Kitts
Umpires: Leslie Reifer (WI) and John Ward (AUS)
Player of the match: Kesrick Williams (Jamaica Tallawahs)

- St Kitts and Nevis Patriots won the toss and elected to field
- Thisara Perera took his 150th T20 wicket and Tabraiz Shamsi took his 50th
- Jon-Russ Jaggesar and Rovman Powell (Jamaica Tallawahs) made their T20 debut

2 July
21:00 (D/N)
Scorecard

(home team) Trinbago Knight Riders; 162/5 (20 overs)	v	Guyana Amazon Warriors; 166/4 (19.2 overs)
Colin Munro 100* (65); Sohail Tanvir 2/21 (4 overs)		Chris Lynn 77 (43); Dwayne Bravo 2/34 (4 overs)

Guyana Amazon Warriors won by 6 wickets
Queen's Park Oval, Port of Spain, Trinidad
Umpires: Johan Cloete (SA) and Patrick Gustard (WI)
Player of the match: Colin Munro (Trinbago Knight Riders)

- Guyana Amazon Warriors won the toss and elected to field
- Colin Munro scored his first T20 century and the first by an overseas player in the CPL

3 July
16:00 (D/N)
Scorecard

(home team) St Kitts & Nevis Patriots; 203/7 (20 overs)	v	St Lucia Zouks; 145/5 (20 overs)
Evin Lewis 73 (36); Shane Watson 3/36 (4 overs)		Shane Watson 55 (31); Samuel Badree 2/22 (4 overs)

St Kitts and Nevis Patriots won by 58 runs
Warner Park, Basseterre, St Kitts
Umpires: Peter Nero (WI) and John Ward (AUS)
Player of the match: Evin Lewis (St Kitts and Nevis Patriots)

- St Lucia Zouks won the toss and elected to field

4 July
21:00 (D/N)
Scorecard

(home team) Trinbago Knight Riders; 191/4 (20 overs)	v	Jamaica Tallawahs; 192/3 (18.2 overs)
Hashim Amla 74 (52); Imad Wasim 1/18 (3 overs)		Chris Gayle 108* (54); Sunil Narine 1/9 (4 overs)

Jamaica Tallawahs won by 7 wickets
Queen's Park Oval, Port of Spain, Trinidad
Umpires: Zahid Bassarath (WI) and Patrick Gustard (WI)
Player of the match: Chris Gayle (Jamaica Tallawahs)

- Jamaica Tallawahs won the toss and elected to field

5 July
19:00 (D/N)
Scorecard

(home team) St Kitts & Nevis Patriots; 162/8 (20 overs)	v	Barbados Tridents; 166/3 (18.4 overs)
Evin Lewis 50 (33); David Wiese 2/14 (3 overs)		AB de Villiers 63* (33); Thisara Perera 2/31 (3 overs)

Barbados Tridents won by 7 wickets
Warner Park, Basseterre, St Kitts
Umpires: Peter Nero (WI) and Leslie Reifer (WI)
Player of the match: AB de Villiers (Barbados Tridents)

- St Kitts and Nevis Patriots won the toss and elected to bat

7 July
19:00 (D/N)
Scorecard

Jamaica Tallawahs; 100 (18 overs)	v	Guyana Amazon Warriors (home team); 101/3 (18 overs)
Rovman Powell 38 (42); Veerasammy Permaul 3/20 (4 overs)		Chris Lynn 39* (35); Imad Wasim 2/6 (4 overs)

Guyana Amazon Warriors won by 7 wickets
Providence Stadium, Providence, Guyana
Umpires: Peter Nero (WI) and John Ward (AUS)
Player of the match: Veerasammy Permaul (Guyana Amazon Warriors)

- Guyana Amazon Warriors won the toss and elected to field
- Adam Zampa took his 50th T20 wicket

9 July
12:00
Scorecard

St Kitts & Nevis Patriots; 108/8 (20 overs)	v	Guyana Amazon Warriors (home team); 109/6 (16.2 overs)
Lendl Simmons 50 (60); Adam Zampa 3/18 (4 overs)		Martin Guptill 43 (22); Samuel Badree 2/18 (4 overs)

Guyana Amazon Warriors won by 4 wickets
Providence Stadium, Providence, Guyana
Umpires: Leslie Reifer (WI) and John Ward (AUS)
Player of the match: Martin Guptill (Guyana Amazon Warriors)

- St Kitts and Nevis Patriots won the toss and elected to bat
- Jonathan Carter scored his 1000th T20 run

10 July
19:00 (D/N)
Scorecard

Trinbago Knight Riders; 151/4 (20 overs)	v	Guyana Amazon Warriors (home team); 144/9 (20 overs)
Hashim Amla 64 (54); Rayad Emrit 2/32 (4 overs)		Martin Guptill 50 (40); Anton Devcich 2/17 (4 overs)

Trinbago Knight Riders won by 7 runs
Providence Stadium, Providence, Guyana
Umpires: Leslie Reifer (WI) and Peter Nero (WI)
Player of the match: Hashim Amla (Trinbago Knight Riders)

- Guyana Amazon Warriors won the toss and elected to field
- Martin Guptill scored his 5000th T20 run

11 July
20:00 (D/N)
Scorecard

Jamaica Tallawahs; 116/2 (10 overs)	v	Barbados Tridents (home team)
Chris Gayle 47* (20); Ravi Rampaul 1/25 (3 overs)

No result
Kensington Oval, Bridgetown, Barbados
Umpires: Zahid Bassarath (WI) and Johan Cloete (SA)

- Barbados Tridents won the toss and elected to field
- The match was called off due to inclement weather
- Chadwick Walton scored his 1000th T20 run

12 July
19:00 (D/N)
Scorecard

St Lucia Zouks; 138/6 (20 overs)	v	Guyana Amazon Warriors (home team); 139/2 (17.2 overs)
Michael Hussey 64 (50); Adam Zampa 2/30 (4 overs)		Jason Mohammed 43* (29); Shane Shillingford 1/28 (4 overs)

Guyana Amazon Warriors won by 8 wickets
Providence Stadium, Providence, Guyana
Umpires: Peter Nero (WI) and John Ward (AUS)
Player of the match: Jason Mohammed (Guyana Amazon Warriors)

- Guyana Amazon Warriors won the toss and elected to field

13 July
20:00 (D/N)
Scorecard

(home team) Barbados Tridents; 180/6 (20 overs)	v	St Kitts & Nevis Patriots; 155/8 (20 overs)
AB de Villiers 82 (54); Sheldon Cottrell 3/25 (4 overs)		Jonathan Carter 46 (38); Imran Khan 2/26 (4 overs)

Barbados Tridents won by 25 runs
Kensington Oval, Bridgetown, Barbados
Umpires: Johan Cloete (SA) and Patrick Gustard
Player of the match: AB de Villiers (Barbados Tridents)

- St Kitts and Nevis Patriots won the toss and elected to field
- Alzarri Joseph (St Kitts and Nevis Patriots) made his T20 debut

15 July
20:00 (D/N)
Scorecard

Guyana Amazon Warriors; 128/6 (20 overs)	v	(home team) Jamaica Tallawahs; 132/5 (15.5 overs)
Jason Mohammed 46* (51); Imad Wasim 2/12 (4 overs)		Shakib Al Hasan 54* (47); Sohail Tanvir 2/14 (3 overs)

Jamaica Tallawahs won by 5 wickets
Sabina Park, Kingston, Jamaica
Umpires: Leslie Reifer (WI) and John Ward (AUS)
Player of the match: Shakib Al Hasan (Jamaica Tallawahs)

- Jamaica Tallawahs won the toss and elected to field
- Ali Khan (Guyana Amazon Warriors) made his T20 debut

16 July
12:00
Scorecard

Barbados Tridents (home team); 172/6 (20 overs)	v	Trinbago Knight Riders; 173/3 (17.4 overs)
Shoaib Malik 47 (44); Dwayne Bravo 2/34 (4 overs)		Colin Munro 68 (39); Wayne Parnell 2/41 (4 overs)

Trinbago Knight Riders won by 7 wickets
Kensington Oval, Bridgetown, Barbados
Umpires: Zahid Bassarath (WI) and Patrick Gustard (WI)
Player of the match: Colin Munro (Trinbago Knight Riders)

- Trinbago Knight Riders won the toss and elected to field
- Dwayne Bravo scored his 5000th T20 run

16 July
18:00
Scorecard

(home team) Jamaica Tallawahs; 183/6 (20 overs)	v	St Kitts & Nevis Patriots; 75 (15.5 overs)
Kumar Sangakkara 65 (47); Krishmar Santokie 3/24 (4 overs)		Jonathan Carter 23 (20); Kesrick Williams 3/19 (4 overs)

Jamaica Tallawahs won by 108 runs
Sabina Park, Kingston, Jamaica
Umpires: Peter Nero (WI) and Leslie Reifer (WI)
Player of the match: Kumar Sangakkara (Jamaica Tallawahs)

- St Kitts and Nevis Patriots won the toss and elected to field

17 July
19:00
Scorecard

(home team) Barbados Tridents; 173/5 (20 overs)	v	St Lucia Zouks; 148/8 (20 overs)
Nicholas Pooran 81 (39); Jerome Taylor 2/27 (4 overs)		Andre Fletcher 20 (13); Ravi Rampaul 2/22 (4 overs)

Barbados Tridents won by 25 runs
Kensington Oval, Bridgetown, Barbados
Umpires: Zahid Bassarath (WI) and Johan Cloete (SA)
Player of the match: Nicholas Pooran (Barbados Tridents)

- St Lucia Zouks won the toss and elected to field

18 July
20:00
Scorecard

(home team) Jamaica Tallawahs; 158/7 (20 overs)	v	Trinbago Knight Riders; 139/9 (20 overs)
Andre Russell 44 (24); Kevon Cooper 3/22 (4 overs)		Hashim Amla 42 (36); Andre Russell 4/23 (4 overs)

Jamaica Tallawahs won by 19 runs
Sabina Park, Kingston, Jamaica
Umpires: Peter Nero (WI) and John Ward (AUS)
Player of the match: Andre Russell (Jamaica Tallawahs)

- Trinbago Knight Riders won the toss and elected to field

20 July
20:00
Scorecard

(home team) Jamaica Tallawahs; 195/5 (18 overs)	v	Barbados Tridents; 159 (17.4 overs)
Chadwick Walton 97 (54); Ravi Rampaul 2/35 (4 overs)		Nicholas Pooran 51 (25); Dale Steyn 4/27 (4 overs)

Jamaica Tallawahs won by 36 runs
Sabina Park, Kingston, Jamaica
Umpires: Leslie Reifer (WI) and John Ward
Player of the match: Chadwick Walton (Jamaica Tallawahs)

- Barbados Tridents won the toss and elected to field
- Rain reduced the match to 18 overs a side
- Dale Steyn took his 200th T20 wicket

21 July
18:00
Scorecard

(home team) St Lucia Zouks; 174/9 (20 overs)	v	St Kitts & Nevis Patriots; 139/9 (20 overs)
Darren Sammy 59 (35); Alzarri Joseph 4/41 (4 overs)		Faf du Plessis 48 (37); Delorn Johnson 3/37 (4 overs)

St Lucia Zouks won by 35 runs
Darren Sammy National Cricket Stadium, Gros Islet, Saint Lucia
Umpires: Johan Cloete (SA) and Patrick Gustard (WI)
Player of the match: Darren Sammy (St Lucia Zouks)

- St Kitts and Nevis Patriots won the toss and elected to field

23 July
12:00
Scorecard

Barbados Tridents; 137/8 (20 overs)	v	St Lucia Zouks (home team); 131/3 (16.3 overs)
Kyle Hope 55 (48); Darren Sammy 3/18 (4 overs)		Andre Fletcher 45 (41); Kieron Pollard 2/20 (3 overs)

St Lucia Zouks won by 7 wickets (D/L method)
Darren Sammy National Cricket Stadium, Gros Islet, Saint Lucia
Umpires: Zahid Bassarath (WI) and Patrick Gustard (WI)
Player of the match: Darren Sammy (St Lucia Zouks)

- Barbados Tridents won the toss and elected to bat
- Rain reduced St Lucia Zouks' innings to 19 overs and their target was revised to 131 runs.
- Shamar Springer (Barbados Tridents) made his T20 debut.

24 July
17:00 (D/N)
Scorecard

Guyana Amazon Warriors; 159/5 (20 overs)	v	St Lucia Zouks (home team); 162/1 (16.1 overs)
Chris Lynn 86 (45); Jerome Taylor 2/26 (4 overs)		Johnson Charles 94* (52); Sohail Tanvir 1/47 (4 overs)

St Lucia Zouks won by 9 wickets
Darren Sammy National Cricket Stadium, Gros Islet, Saint Lucia
Umpires: Zahid Bassarath (WI) and Johan Cloete (SA)
Player of the match: Johnson Charles (St Lucia Zouks)

- St Lucia Zouks won the toss and elected to field
- Shimron Hetmyer (Guyana Amazon Warriors) made his T20 debut.

26 July
18:00 (D/N)
Scorecard

(home team) St Lucia Zouks; 167/6 (20 overs)	v	Trinbago Knight Riders; 168/7 (19 overs)
Darren Sammy 37* (18); Dwayne Bravo 2/34 (4 overs)		Umar Akmal 73* (35); Delorn Johnson 3/22 (4 overs)

Trinbago Knight Riders won by 3 wickets
Darren Sammy National Cricket Stadium, Gros Islet, Saint Lucia
Umpires: Johan Cloete (SA) and Patrick Gustard (WI)
Player of the match: Umar Akmal (Trinbago Knight Riders)

- Trinbago Knight Riders won the toss and elected to field

28 July
19:00 (D/N)
Scorecard

Barbados Tridents; 142/7 (20 overs)	v	Guyana Amazon Warriors; 143/4 (18.2 overs)
Shoaib Malik 55* (44); Rayad Emrit 2/24 (4 overs)		Dwayne Smith 50 (34); Raymon Reifer 2/22 (4 overs)

Guyana Amazon Warriors won by 6 wickets
Central Broward Regional Park, Lauderhill, Florida, United States
Umpires: Peter Nero (WI) and Leslie Reifer (WI)
Player of the match: Dwayne Smith (Guyana Amazon Warriors)

- Guyana Amazon Warriors won the toss and elected to field

29 July
19:00 (D/N)
Scorecard

St Kitts & Nevis Patriots; 180/5 (20 overs)	v	Trinbago Knight Riders; 146 (18 overs)
Evin Lewis 79 (40); Sunil Narine 3/27 (4 overs)		Colin Munro 46 (28); Krishmar Santokie 3/27 (4 overs)

St Kitts and Nevis Patriots won by 34 runs
Central Broward Regional Park, Lauderhill, Florida, United States
Umpires: Patrick Gustard (WI) and Zahid Bassarath (WI)
Player of the match: Evin Lewis (St Kitts and Nevis Patriots)

- Trinbago Knight Riders won the toss and elected to field

30 July
12:00
Scorecard

St Lucia Zouks; 206/3 (20 overs)	v	Jamaica Tallawahs; 143/8 (20 overs)
Andre Fletcher 74* (49); Kesrick Williams 2/28 (4 overs)		Chadwick Walton 54 (51); Delorn Johnson 3/30 (4 overs)

St Lucia Zouks won by 63 runs
Central Broward Regional Park, Lauderhill, Florida, United States
Umpires: Peter Nero (WI) and John Ward (Aus)
Player of the match: Andre Fletcher (St Lucia Zouks)

- Jamaica Tallawahs won the toss and elected to field
- Gidron Pope (St Lucia Zouks) made his T20 debut.

30 July
16:00
Scorecard

Barbados Tridents; 158/6 (20 overs)	v	Guyana Amazon Warriors; 161/4 (19.3 overs)
Kieron Pollard 47 (36); Sohail Tanvir 2/24 (4 overs)		Jason Mohammed 57* (41); Raymon Reifer 2/22 (4 overs)

Guyana Amazon Warriors won by 6 wickets
Central Broward Regional Park, Lauderhill, Florida, United States
Umpires: Zahid Bassarath (WI) and Johan Cloete (SA)
Player of the match: Jason Mohammed (Guyana Amazon Warriors)

- Barbados Tridents won the toss and elected to bat

31 July
12:00
Scorecard

St Kitts & Nevis Patriots; 137/6 (20 overs)	v	Trinbago Knight Riders; 138/2 (17 overs)
Lendl Simmons 60* (40); Dwayne Bravo 4/13 (4 overs)		Denesh Ramdin 52* (46); Jeremiah Louis 1/25 (3 overs)

Trinbago Knight Riders won by 8 wickets
Central Broward Regional Park, Lauderhill, Florida, United States
Umpires: John Ward (Aus) and Leslie Reifer (WI)
Player of the match: Dwayne Bravo (Trinbago Knight Riders)

- St Kitts and Nevis Patriots won the toss and elected to bat
- Jeremiah Louis (St Kitts and Nevis Patriots) made his T20 debut.

31 July
16:00
Scorecard

St Lucia Zouks; 194/3 (20 overs)	v	Jamaica Tallawahs; 177/6 (20 overs)
Andre Fletcher 70 (54); Rovman Powell 2/45 (4 overs)		Chris Gayle 30 (15); Shane Shillingford 2/30 (4 overs)

St Lucia Zouks won by 17 runs
Central Broward Regional Park, Lauderhill, Florida, United States
Umpires: Johan Cloete (SA) and Patrick Gustard (WI)
Player of the match: Shane Watson (St Lucia Zouks)

- Jamaica Tallawahs won the toss and elected to field

== Knockout stage ==
=== Bracket ===
Qualifier 1
1	Guyana Amazon Warriors	150/6 (19.4 ov.)
2	Jamaica Tallawahs	146/8 (20 ov.)
Eliminator
3	St Lucia Stars	164/8 (20 ov.)
4	Trinbago Knight Riders	165/5 (18.3 ov.)

Qualifier 2
2	Jamaica Tallawahs	195/7 (20 ov.)
4	Trinbago Knight Riders	110/7 (12 ov.) (D/L)

Final
1	Guyana Amazon Warriors	93 (16.1 ov.)
2	Jamaica Tallawahs	95/1 (12.5 ov.)

=== Qualifier 1 ===
3 August
19:00 (D/N)
Scorecard

Jamaica Tallawahs; 146/8 (20 overs)	v	Guyana Amazon Warriors; 150/6 (19.4 overs)
Chris Gayle 33 (36); Rayad Emrit 3/30 (4 overs)		Chris Lynn 49 (47); Kesrick Williams 4/37 (4 overs)

Guyana Amazon Warriors won by 4 wickets
Warner Park, Basseterre, Saint Kitts
Umpires: Leslie Reifer (WI) and John Ward (Aus)
Player of the match: Sohail Tanvir (Guyana Amazon Warriors)

- Guyana Amazon Warriors won the toss and elected to field
- Guyana Amazon Warriors advances to Final. Jamaica Tallawahs drops to Qualifier 2.

=== Eliminator ===
4 August
19:00 (D/N)
Scorecard

St Lucia Zouks; 164/8 (20 overs)	v	Trinbago Knight Riders; 165/5 (18.3 overs)
Andre Fletcher 41 (43); Ronsford Beaton 3/23 (4 overs)		Brendon McCullum 49* (41); Jerome Taylor 2/31 (4 overs)

Trinbago Knight Riders won by 5 wickets
Warner Park, Basseterre, Saint Kitts
Umpires: John Ward (Aus) and Johan Cloete (SA)
Player of the match: Brendon McCullum (Trinbago Knight Riders)

- Trinbago Knight Riders won the toss elected to field
- Trinbago Knight Riders advances to Qualifier 2. St Lucia Zouks is eliminated.

=== Qualifier 2 ===
5 August
20:00 (D/N)
Scorecard

Jamaica Tallawahs; 195/7 (20 overs)	v	Trinbago Knight Riders; 110/7 (12 overs)
Andre Russell 100 (44); Kevon Cooper 3/45 (4 overs)		Colin Munro 38 (26); Shakib Al Hasan 3/23 (2 overs)

Jamaica Tallawahs won by 19 runs (D/L method)
Warner Park, Basseterre, Saint Kitts
Umpires: Leslie Reifer (WI) and Johan Cloete (SA)
Player of the match: Andre Russell (Jamaica Tallawahs)

- Trinbago Knight Riders won the toss and elected to field
- Rain reduces Trinbago Knight Riders' innings to 12 overs and their target was revised to 130 runs.
- Oshane Thomas (Jamaica Tallawahs) and Anderson Phillip (Trinbago Knight Riders) made their T20 debut.
- Jamaica Tallawahs advances to Final. Trinbago Knight Riders is eliminated.

=== Final ===
7 August
19:00 (D/N)
Scorecard

Guyana Amazon Warriors; 93 (16.1 overs)	v	Jamaica Tallawahs; 95/1 (12.5 overs)
Sohail Tanvir 42 (37); Imad Wasim 3/21 (4 overs)		Chris Gayle 54 (27); Rayad Emrit 1/13 (3 overs)

Jamaica Tallawahs won by 9 wickets
Warner Park, Basseterre, Saint Kitts
Umpires: John Ward (Aus) and Leslie Reifer (WI)
Player of the match: Imad Wasim (Jamaica Tallawahs)

- Jamaica Tallawahs won the toss elected to field
- Jamaica Tallawahs won the 2016 Caribbean Premier League.

== Statistics ==
=== Most runs ===
Player	Team	Matches	!1Runs	High score
Chris Lynn	Guyana Amazon Warriors	12	454	86
Johnson Charles	St Lucia Zouks	11	441	94 not out
Chris Gayle	Jamaica Tallawahs	13	425	108 not out
Hashim Amla	Trinbago Knight Riders	11	410	81
Colin Munro	Trinbago Knight Riders	11	382	100 not out

- Source: Cricinfo

=== Most wickets ===
Player	Team	Matches	Wickets	Best bowling
Dwayne Bravo	Trinbago Knight Riders	12	21	4/13
Sohail Tanvir	Guyana Amazon Warriors	12	20	4/20
Kesrick Williams	Jamaica Tallawahs	13	17	4/37
Rayad Emrit	Guyana Amazon Warriors	12	16	3/30
Adam Zampa	Guyana Amazon Warriors	12	15	3/18

- Source: Cricinfo
