= West Indian cricket team in India in 2019–20 =

International cricket tour

West Indies cricket team in India in 2019–20
	India	West Indies
- Dates: 6 – 22 December 2019
Captains	Virat Kohli	Kieron Pollard

One Day International series
- Results: India won the 3-match series 2–1
Most runs	Rohit Sharma (258)	Shai Hope (222)
Most wickets	Mohammed Shami (5)	Keemo Paul (6)
- Player of the series: Rohit Sharma (Ind)

Twenty20 International series
- Results: India won the 3-match series 2–1
Most runs	Virat Kohli (183)	Shimron Hetmyer (120)
Most wickets	Deepak Chahar (3)	Khary Pierre (3); Sheldon Cottrell (3)
- Player of the series: Virat Kohli (Ind)

The West Indies cricket team toured India in December 2019 to play three One Day Internationals (ODIs) and three Twenty20 International (T20I) matches. In November 2019, the Board of Control for Cricket in India (BCCI) swapped the venues for the first and third T20I matches. Ahead of the tour, Chris Gayle confirmed that he would not be playing in the ODIs for the West Indies, after he announced he would be taking a break from cricket.

For the first time in international cricket, the International Cricket Council (ICC) announced the use of technology to monitor front-foot no-balls for all matches during the tour. The third umpire called the front-foot no-balls, communicating this with the on-field umpires. It was used as a trial to see if it can be implemented further, without a detriment to the flow of the game.

India won the T20I series 2–1, winning the third and deciding match by 67 runs. India also won the ODI series 2–1, after losing the opening match. It was India's tenth-consecutive win in a bilateral ODI series against the West Indies, going back to May 2006, when the West Indies beat India 4–1 at home.

== Squads ==
ODIs		T20Is	
India	West Indies	India	West Indies
Virat Kohli (c); Mayank Agarwal; Yuzvendra Chahal; Deepak Chahar; ~~Shikhar Dhawan~~; Shivam Dube; Shreyas Iyer; Ravindra Jadeja; Kedar Jadhav; ~~Bhuvneshwar Kumar~~; Manish Pandey; Rishabh Pant (wk); KL Rahul; Navdeep Saini; Mohammed Shami; Rohit Sharma; Shardul Thakur; Kuldeep Yadav	Kieron Pollard (c); Sunil Ambris; Roston Chase; Sheldon Cottrell; Shimron Hetmyer; Jason Holder; Shai Hope; Alzarri Joseph; Brandon King; Evin Lewis; Keemo Paul; Khary Pierre; Nicholas Pooran; Romario Shepherd; Hayden Walsh Jr.	Virat Kohli (c); Yuzvendra Chahal; Deepak Chahar; ~~Shikhar Dhawan~~; Shivam Dube; Shreyas Iyer; Ravindra Jadeja; Bhuvneshwar Kumar; Manish Pandey; Rishabh Pant (wk); KL Rahul; Sanju Samson; Mohammed Shami; Rohit Sharma; Washington Sundar; Kuldeep Yadav	Kieron Pollard (c); Fabian Allen; Sheldon Cottrell; Shimron Hetmyer; Jason Holder; Brandon King; Evin Lewis; Keemo Paul; Khary Pierre; Nicholas Pooran; Denesh Ramdin; Sherfane Rutherford; Lendl Simmons; Hayden Walsh Jr.; Kesrick Williams

Ahead of the series, Shikhar Dhawan injured his left leg and was replaced by Sanju Samson in India's T20I squad. Dhawan was later also ruled out of India's ODI squad, and was replaced by Mayank Agarwal. Bhuvneshwar Kumar was also ruled out of India's ODI squad due to injury and was replaced by Shardul Thakur. Navdeep Saini was added to India's squad for the third and final ODI, replacing the injured Deepak Chahar.

During the West Indies' ODI series against Afghanistan in November 2019, Nicholas Pooran was found guilty of ball tampering. He was banned for four T20I matches, therefore missing the three T20I matches against Afghanistan and the first T20I against India.

== T20I series ==
=== 1st T20I ===
6 December 2019
19:00 (N)
Scorecard

West Indies; 207/5 (20 overs)	v	India; 209/4 (18.4 overs)
Shimron Hetmyer 56 (41); Yuzvendra Chahal 2/36 (4 overs)		Virat Kohli 94* (50); Khary Pierre 2/44 (4 overs)

India won by 6 wickets
Rajiv Gandhi International Cricket Stadium, Hyderabad
Umpires: Nitin Menon (Ind) and Chettithody Shamshuddin (Ind)
Player of the match: Virat Kohli (Ind)

- India won the toss and elected to field.
- KL Rahul (Ind) scored his 1,000th run in T20Is.
- This was the highest total chased down by India in T20Is.

=== 2nd T20I ===
8 December 2019
19:00 (N)
Scorecard

India; 170/7 (20 overs)	v	West Indies; 173/2 (18.3 overs)
Shivam Dube 54 (30); Hayden Walsh Jr. 2/28 (4 overs)		Lendl Simmons 67* (45); Ravindra Jadeja 1/22 (2 overs)

West Indies won by 8 wickets
Greenfield International Stadium, Thiruvananthapuram
Umpires: Anil Chaudhary (Ind) and C. K. Nandan (Ind)
Player of the match: Lendl Simmons (WI)

- West Indies won the toss and elected to field.

=== 3rd T20I ===
11 December 2019
19:00 (N)
Scorecard

India; 240/3 (20 overs)	v	West Indies; 173/8 (20 overs)
KL Rahul 91 (56); Kieron Pollard 1/33 (2 overs)		Kieron Pollard 68 (39); Deepak Chahar 2/20 (4 overs)

India won by 67 runs
Wankhede Stadium, Mumbai
Umpires: Nitin Menon (Ind) and C. K. Nandan (Ind)
Player of the match: KL Rahul (Ind)

- West Indies won the toss and elected to field.
- Virat Kohli became the first batsman for India to score 1,000 runs at home in T20Is.
- Kieron Pollard became the fourth batsman for the West Indies to score 1,000 runs in T20Is.

== ODI series ==
=== 1st ODI ===
15 December 2019
13:30 (D/N)
Scorecard

India; 287/8 (50 overs)	v	West Indies; 291/2 (47.5 overs)
Rishabh Pant 71 (69); Keemo Paul 2/40 (7 overs)		Shimron Hetmyer 139 (106); Deepak Chahar 1/48 (10 overs)

West Indies won by 8 wickets
M. A. Chidambaram Stadium, Chennai
Umpires: Shaun George (SA) and Nitin Menon (Ind)
Player of the match: Shimron Hetmyer (WI)

- West Indies won the toss and elected to field.
- Shivam Dube (Ind) made his ODI debut.

=== 2nd ODI ===
18 December 2019
13:30 (D/N)
Scorecard

India; 387/5 (50 overs)	v	West Indies; 280 (43.3 overs)
Rohit Sharma 159 (138); Sheldon Cottrell 2/83 (9 overs)		Shai Hope 78 (85); Mohammed Shami 3/39 (7.3 overs)

India won by 107 runs
ACA–VDCA Cricket Stadium, Vishakhapatnam
Umpires: Anil Chaudhary (Ind) and Rod Tucker (Aus)
Player of the match: Rohit Sharma (Ind)

- West Indies won the toss and elected to field.
- Khary Pierre (WI) made his ODI debut.
- India scored 31 runs in the 47th over of the match, the most productive over for India in ODIs.
- Shreyas Iyer scored 28 runs in the 47th over of the match, the most runs scored by a batsman for India in a single over in ODIs.
- Virat Kohli (Ind) and Kieron Pollard (WI) were both dismissed for a golden duck, the first time that both captains were dismissed by the first ball without scoring in the same ODI match.
- Kuldeep Yadav became the first bowler for India to take two hat-tricks in ODIs.

=== 3rd ODI ===
22 December 2019
13:30 (D/N)
Scorecard

West Indies; 315/5 (50 overs)	v	India; 316/6 (48.4 overs)
Nicholas Pooran 89 (64); Navdeep Saini 2/58 (10 overs)		Virat Kohli 85 (81); Keemo Paul 3/59 (9.4 overs)

India won by 4 wickets
Barabati Stadium, Cuttack
Umpires: Shaun George (SA) and Nitin Menon (Ind)
Player of the match: Virat Kohli (Ind)

- India won the toss and elected to field.
- Navdeep Saini (Ind) made his ODI debut.
- Shai Hope (WI) became the second-fastest batsman, in terms of innings, to score 3,000 runs in ODIs (67).
