= Kevon Boodie =

Guyanese cricketer (born 1993)

Personal information
- Born: 28 June 1993 (age 33); Tuschen, Guyana
- Batting: Right-handed

Domestic team information
- Years: Team
- 2016: Guyana
- Source: ESPNcricinfo, 18 January 2016

Kevon Boodie (born 28 June 1993) is a Guyanese cricketer who has played for the Guyanese national side in West Indian domestic cricket. A right-handed opening batsman, he made his List A debut for Guyana in January 2016, playing against the Combined Campuses and Colleges in the 2015–16 Regional Super50. He opened the batting with Assad Fudadin on debut, scoring six runs before being dismissed by Christopher Powell.
