= Christopher Lamont (cricketer) =

Jamaican cricketer (born 1988)

Personal information
- Born: 6 January 1988 (age 38); Kingston, Jamaica
- Batting: Left-handed
- Bowling: Left-arm orthodox spin
- Role: Bowler

Domestic team information
- Years: Team
- 2017-2019: Jamaica
- 2018: St Lucia Stars
- 2019: Jamaica Tallawahs
- First-class debut: 14 December 2017 Jamaica v Windward Islands
- Last First-class: 18 January 2018 Jamaica v Barbados
- List A debut: 2 February 2018 Jamaica v Leeward Islands
- Last List A: 24 November 2019 Jamaica v Leeward Islands

Career statistics
Competition	FC	List A
Matches	2	20
Runs scored	0	38
Batting average	–	7.60
100s/50s	0/0	0/0
Top score	0*	14*
Balls bowled	510	959
Wickets	9	14
Bowling average	21.66	43.85
5 wickets in innings	0	0
10 wickets in match	0	0
Best bowling	4/52	2/17
Catches/stumpings	1/–	8/–
- Source: Cricinfo, 2 February 2021

Christopher Lamont (born 6 January 1988) is a Jamaican cricketer.

== Domestic career ==
Lamont made his first-class debut for Jamaica in the 2017–18 Regional Four Day Competition on 14 December 2017. He made his List A debut for Jamaica in the 2017–18 Regional Super50 on 2 February 2018.

Lamont made his Twenty20 debut for St Lucia Stars in the 2018 Caribbean Premier League on 2 September 2018, and was named the man of the match. In October 2019, he was named in Jamaica's squad for the 2019–20 Regional Super50 tournament.
