= Jermaine Harrison =

Jamaican cricketer (born 1985)

Personal information
- Full name: Jermaine Ean Harrison
- Born: 12 September 1985 (age 41); Kingston, Jamaica
- Batting: Right-handed
- Bowling: Right-arm medium

Domestic team information
- Years: Team
- 2016: Jamaica
- Source: CricketArchive, 14 January 2016

Jermaine Ean Harrison (born 12 September 1985) is a Jamaican cricketer who has played for Jamaica in West Indian domestic cricket. He made his List A debut in January 2016, opening the batting with John Campbell against Trinidad and Tobago in the 2015–16 Regional Super50. Outside of playing cricket, Harrison is a member of the Jamaica Defence Force.
