= Philton Williams =

Trinidadian cricketer (born 1994)

Personal information
- Born: 21 June 1994 (age 32); Laventille, Trinidad and Tobago
- Batting: Right-handed
- Bowling: Right-arm fast

Domestic team information
- Years: Team
- 2016: Trinidad and Tobago
- Source: CricketArchive, 12 January 2016

Philton Williams (born 21 June 1994) is a Trinidadian cricketer who plays for the Trinidad and Tobago national team in West Indian domestic cricket. A right-arm fast bowler, he made his List A debut for the team in January 2016, against Jamaica in the 2015–16 Regional Super50.
