= Mark Deyal =

Trinidadian cricketer

Personal information
- Born: 7 April 1993 (age 33); Couva, Trinidad and Tobago
- Batting: Left-handed
- Bowling: Right-arm off spin

Domestic team information
- Years: Team
- 2015: Trinidad and Tobago
- 2015: T&T Red Steel
- 2016: Combined Campuses
- 2020-present: Saint Lucia Kings

Career statistics
Competition	FC	LA	T20
Matches	1	12	42
Runs scored	12	162	678
Batting average	6.0	16.2	18.83
100s/50s	0/0	0/1	0/2
Top score	10	68	78
Balls bowled	15	378	251
Wickets	0	11	11
Bowling average	0	27.63	33.54
5 wickets in innings	0	0	0
10 wickets in match	0	0	0
Best bowling	0	3/22	2/2
Catches/stumpings	1/0	4/0	16/0
- Source: ESPNcricinfo, 7 January 2024

Mark Deyal (born 7 April 1993) is a Trinidadian cricketer who has played for both Trinidad and Tobago and the Combined Campuses and Colleges in West Indian domestic cricket, as well as representing the Saint Lucia Kings franchise in the Caribbean Premier League (CPL).

Deyal was born in Couva. He made his first-class debut for Trinidad and Tobago in the last match of the 2014–15 Regional Four Day Competition, against the Leeward Islands. Deyal subsequently signed with the Red Steel franchise for the 2015 Caribbean Premier League season. He made his debut for the team against the Jamaica Tallawahs, and scored 23 runs from 25 balls coming in sixth in the batting order. For the 2015–16 Regional Super50, Deyal switched from Trinidad and Tobago to the Combined Campuses, making his debut for the team against the Leeward Islands.

On 3 June 2018, he was selected to play for the Winnipeg Hawks in the players' draft for the inaugural edition of the Global T20 Canada tournament. In July 2020, he was named in the Saint Lucia Kings squad for the 2020 Caribbean Premier League.
