= Chandrapaul Hemraj =

Guyanese cricketer

Personal information
- Born: 3 September 1993 (age 33); Guyana
- Batting: Left-handed
- Bowling: Slow left-arm orthodox
- Role: Opening batsman

International information
- National side: West Indies
- ODI debut (cap 185): 21 October 2018 v India
- Last ODI: 14 December 2018 v Bangladesh

Domestic team information
- Years: Team
- 2012–present: Guyana
- 2018: St Lucia Stars
- 2019–present: Guyana Amazon Warriors (squad no. 11)

Career statistics
Competition	ODI	FC	LA	T20
Matches	6	37	44	46
Runs scored	82	1869	1113	900
Batting average	13.66	28.75	25.88	20.45
100s/50s	0/0	1/13	2/3	1/2
Top score	32	144	103*	105*
Balls bowled	7	214	714	229
Wickets	0	2	15	11
Bowling average	0	45.50	36.66	24.45
5 wickets in innings	0	0	0	0
10 wickets in match	0	0	0	0
Best bowling	0	1/7	3/18	3/15
Catches/stumpings	2/0	17/0	9/0	10/0
- Source: ESPNcricinfo, 7 January 2024

Chandrapaul Hemraj (born 3 September 1993) is a Guyanese cricketer. He made his first-class debut for Guyana in the 2011–12 Regional Four Day Competition on 16 March 2012. He made his List A debut for Guyana in the 2017–18 Regional Super50 on 31 January 2018. He made his Twenty20 debut for St Lucia Stars in the 2018 Caribbean Premier League on 16 August 2018.

In October 2018, he was named in the West Indies' One Day International (ODI) squad for series against India. He made his ODI debut for the West Indies against India on 21 October 2018.

In October 2019, he was named in Guyana's squad for the 2019–20 Regional Super50 tournament. In July 2020, he was named in the Guyana Amazon Warriors squad for the 2020 Caribbean Premier League. In June 2021, he was selected to take part in the Minor League Cricket tournament in the United States following the players' draft.
