= Chemar Holder =

Barbadian cricketer

Personal information
- Full name: Chemar Keron Holder
- Born: 3 March 1998 (age 28); Barbados
- Batting: Right-handed
- Bowling: Right-arm fast
- Role: Bowler

International information
- National side: West Indies (2020–present)
- Only Test (cap 322): 11 December 2020 v New Zealand
- Only ODI (cap 199): 20 January 2021 v Bangladesh

Domestic team information
- Years: Team
- 2016: Combined Campuses
- 2017–present: Barbados (squad no. 17)
- 2020–present: St Lucia Zouks (squad no. 40)
- 2021: Warwickshire
- 2024: Durham

Career statistics
Competition	Test	ODI	FC	LA
Matches	1	1	33	39
Runs scored	21	0	300	53
Batting average	–	–	10.00	4.07
100s/50s	0/0	0/0	0/0	0/0
Top score	13*	0*	34*	12
Balls bowled	156	18	5,261	1,621
Wickets	2	0	101	52
Bowling average	55.00	–	31.32	29.46
5 wickets in innings	0	–	6	1
10 wickets in match	0	–	1	0
Best bowling	2/110	–	6/47	5/22
Catches/stumpings	0/–	0/–	17/–	10/–
- Source: Cricinfo, 26 March 2025

Chemar Keron Holder (born 3 March 1998) is a Barbadian cricketer who has played for the Combined Campuses and Colleges in West Indian domestic cricket. A right-arm fast bowler, he made his List A debut for the team in January 2016, against the Leeward Islands in the 2015–16 Regional Super50. Aged only 17 on debut, he opened the bowling with Christopher Powell, taking 1/20 from four overs. He made his international debut for the West Indies cricket team in December 2020, becoming only the fourth member of the Holder family to be selected for the West Indies behind Roland Holder, Vanburn Holder and more recently Jason Holder.

== Career ==
He made his first-class debut for Barbados in the 2017–18 Regional Four Day Competition on 11 January 2018. He made his Twenty20 debut for Barbados Tridents in the 2018 Caribbean Premier League on 29 August 2018. In October 2019, he was selected to play for Barbados in the 2019–20 Regional Super50 tournament.

In June 2020, Holder was named in the West Indies' Test squad, for their series against England. The Test series was originally scheduled to start in May 2020, but was moved back to July 2020 due to the COVID-19 pandemic.

In July 2020, he was named in the St Lucia Zouks squad for the 2020 Caribbean Premier League. In October 2020, Holder was also named in the West Indies' Test squad for their series against New Zealand. He made his Test debut for the West Indies, against New Zealand, on 11 December 2020.

In December 2020, Holder was named in the West Indies' One Day International (ODI) squad for their series against Bangladesh. He made his ODI debut for the West Indies, against Bangladesh, on 20 January 2021.
