= Jovan Ali =

Trinidadian cricketer (born 1995)

Personal information
- Born: 3 May 1995 (age 31); Trinidad
- Batting: Left-handed
- Bowling: Left-arm orthodox

Domestic team information
- Years: Team
- 2016: Combined Campuses
- Source: CricketArchive, 18 January 2016

Jovan Ali (born 3 May 1995) is a Trinidadian cricketer who has played for the Combined Campuses and Colleges in West Indian domestic cricket. A slow left-arm orthodox bowler, Ali made his List A debut for the team in January 2016, playing against the Leeward Islands in the 2015–16 Regional Super50.
