= Dane Currency =

Barbadian cricketer (born 1985)

Personal information
- Full name: Dane Dominic Currency
- Born: 4 February 1985 (age 41); Barbados
- Batting: Right-handed
- Bowling: Left-arm orthodox

Domestic team information
- Years: Team
- 2016: Barbados
- Source: CricketArchive, 12 January 2016

Dane Dominic Currency (born 4 February 1985) is a Barbadian cricketer who has represented the Barbados national team in West Indian domestic cricket. A left-arm orthodox spin bowler, he made his List A debut in January 2016, playing against Jamaica in the 2015–16 Regional Super50.
