= Vikash Mohan (Trinidadian cricketer) =

Trinidadian cricketer

Personal information
- Born: 22 September 1994 (age 32); Port Of Spain, Trinidad and Tobago
- Batting: Right-handed
- Bowling: Right-arm off spin

Domestic team information
- Years: Team
- 2016: Combined Campuses
- Source: CricketArchive, 12 January 2016

Vikash Mohan (born 22 September 1994) is a Trinidadian cricketer who has played for the Combined Campuses and Colleges in West Indian domestic cricket. A right-arm fast bowler, he made his List A debut for the team in January 2016, against Jamaica in the 2015–16 Regional Super50. He did not get an opportunity to bat on debut, as his team's innings was washed out, but made 40 runs in the next match against the Windward Islands, opening the batting with Anthony Alleyne.

Mohan holds a United States passport. In June 2019, he was named in a 30-man training squad for the United States cricket team, ahead of the Regional Finals of the 2018–19 ICC T20 World Cup Americas Qualifier tournament in Bermuda.
