= Kristopher Ramsaran =

Trinidadian cricketer (born 1992)

Personal information
- Born: 1 February 1992 (age 34); Trinidad
- Batting: Right-handed
- Bowling: Slow left-arm wrist-spin

Domestic team information
- Years: Team
- 2013–2016: Combined Campuses
- Source: CricketArchive, 2 January 2016

Kristopher Ramsaran (born 1 February 1992) is a Trinidadian cricketer who has played for the Combined Campuses and Colleges in West Indian domestic cricket. A slow left-arm wrist-spin bowler, he made his debut for the team in January 2013, in the 2012–13 Caribbean Twenty20, and a few months later made his first-class debut, playing a single match in the 2012–13 Regional Four Day Competition. After his debut season, Ramsaran did not return to the team until January 2016, when he played in the 2015–16 Regional Super50.
