= Daron Cruickshank (cricketer) =

Trinidadian cricketer (born 1986)

Personal information
- Full name: Daron Alfred Cruickshank
- Born: 17 June 1986 (age 40); Port of Spain, Trinidad
- Batting: Right-handed
- Bowling: Right-arm medium

Domestic team information
- Years: Team
- 2008–2014: Trinidad and Tobago
- 2015–2016: Leeward Islands
- Source: CricketArchive, 3 January 2016

Daron Alfred Cruickshank (born 17 June 1986) is a Trinidadian cricketer who has played for both Trinidad and Tobago and the Leeward Islands in West Indian domestic cricket.

Cruickshank made his senior debut for Trinidad and Tobago in October 2008, playing in an exhibition match against England that was part of the 2008 Stanford Super Series. His first-class debut came the following year, during the 2008–09 Regional Four Day Competition. For the 2015–16 Regional Four Day Competition, Cruickshank switched to play for the Leeward Islands. In his second game for the Leewards, against Guyana, he scored a maiden first-class half-century, 57 runs from 83 balls.
