= Mervin Matthew =

West Indian cricketer (born 1985)

Personal information
- Born: 23 September 1985 (age 41); Dominica
- Batting: Right-handed
- Bowling: Right-arm fast-medium
- Role: Bowler

Domestic team information
- Years: Team
- 2005/06–2016/17: Windward Islands
- 2006–2007/08: Dominica
- 2014: St Lucia Zouks
- 2017/18: Leeward Islands

Career statistics
Competition	FC	LA	T20
Matches	47	38	17
Runs scored	811	200	70
Batting average	14.48	9.52	7.77
100s/50s	0/1	0/0	0/0
Top score	73	31*	27*
Balls bowled	6,711	1,599	330
Wickets	121	51	17
Bowling average	20.38	22.88	24.23
5 wickets in innings	4	0	0
10 wickets in match	0	0	0
Best bowling	6/81	4/38	3/15
Catches/stumpings	24/–	8/–	2/–
- Source: ESPNcricinfo, 17 April 2023

Mervin Matthew (born 23 September 1985) is a former Dominican cricketer who was a member of the West Indies cricket team that took part in the Under-19 Cricket World Cup in Bangladesh in 2004. He was born in Dominica has played first-class and List A cricket for the Windward Islands and Leeward Islands.
