= Jon-Russ Jaggesar =

West Indian cricketer

Personal information
- Full name: Jon-Russ Luke Jaggesar
- Born: 19 March 1986 (age 40); San Fernando, Trinidad and Tobago
- Batting: Right-handed
- Bowling: Right-arm off break

Domestic team information
- Years: Team
- 2016–present: Trinidad and Tobago
- 2016–present: St Kitts & Nevis Patriots

Career statistics
Competition	FC	LA	T20
Matches	9	27	21
Runs scored	52	25	22
Batting average	4.72	8.33
100s/50s	0/0	0/0	0/0
Top score	29	11	10*
Balls bowled	1,917	1,239	390
Wickets	31	42	17
Bowling average	31.67	19.00	29.41
5 wickets in innings	1	0	0
10 wickets in match	1	0	0
Best bowling	8/58	4/29	3/32
Catches/stumpings	4/–	7/–	4/–
- Source: CricketArchive, 23 February 2023

Jon-Russ Luke Jaggesar (born 19 March 1986) is a Trinidadian cricketer who plays for the Trinidad and Tobago national team in West Indian domestic cricket. He is a right-arm off-spin bowler.

Jaggesar made his List A debut for Trinidad and Tobago in January 2016, playing against Jamaica in the 2015–16 Regional Super50. He finished the tournament with 14 wickets from six matches (behind only Sulieman Benn overall), which included performances of 3/24 against Barbados and 4/32 against Jamaica. Jaggesar made his first-class debut the following month, playing against Guyana in the 2015–16 Regional Four Day Competition.

In November 2019, he was named in Trinidad and Tobago's squad for the 2019–20 Regional Super50 tournament. In July 2020, he was named in the St Kitts & Nevis Patriots squad for the 2020 Caribbean Premier League.
