= Navdeep Saini =

Indian cricketer (born 1992)

Personal information
- Full name: Navdeep Amarjeet Saini
- Born: 23 November 1992 (age 33); Karnal, Haryana, India
- Height: 5 ft 10 in (178 cm)
- Batting: Right-handed
- Bowling: Right-arm fast
- Role: Bowler

International information
- National side: India (2019–2021)
- Test debut (cap 299): 7 January 2021 v Australia
- Last Test: 15 January 2021 v Australia
- ODI debut (cap 229): 22 December 2019 v West Indies
- Last ODI: 23 July 2021 v Sri Lanka
- ODI shirt no.: 96
- T20I debut (cap 80): 3 August 2019 v West Indies
- Last T20I: 28 July 2021 v Sri Lanka
- T20I shirt no.: 96

Domestic team information
- Years: Team
- 2013–present: Delhi
- 2019–2021: Royal Challengers Bangalore
- 2022–2024: Rajasthan Royals
- 2022: Kent
- 2023: Worcestershire
- 2026-present: Kolkata Knight Riders

Career statistics
Competition	Test	ODI	T20I	FC
Matches	2	8	11	74
Runs scored	8	107	12	627
Batting average	4.00	53.50	–	12.79
100s/50s	0/0	0/0	0/0	0/2
Top score	5	45	11*	56
Balls bowled	251	420	197	11,745
Wickets	4	6	13	207
Bowling average	43.00	80.16	18.07	29.40
5 wickets in innings	0	0	0	6
10 wickets in match	0	0	0	0
Best bowling	2/54	2/58	3/17	6/32
Catches/stumpings	1/–	3/–	3/–	24/–
- Source: ESPNcricinfo, 27 March 2025

Navdeep Amarjeet Saini (Hindi: [nʌʋˈd̪eːp ˈsɛːniː]; born 23 November 1992) is an Indian cricketer who represented his country in all three international formats between 2019 and 2021. He has played for Delhi in domestic cricket since 2013 and has appeared in the Indian Premier League (IPL). He made his international debut for the India cricket team in August 2019.

== Early life ==
Navdeep Saini was born on 23 November 1992 in Karnal, Haryana. His father, a driver, was employed with the government of Haryana. His grandfather Karam Singh, an independence activist, was a part of Subhas Chandra Bose's Indian National Army.

== Domestic career ==
Saini made his Twenty20 debut on 2 January 2016 in the 2015–16 Syed Mushtaq Ali Trophy.

In February 2017, he was bought by the Delhi Daredevils team for the 2017 Indian Premier League for 10 lakhs. In January 2018, he was bought by the Royal Challengers Bangalore in the 2018 IPL auction for 3 crores.

He was the leading wicket-taker for Delhi in the 2017–18 Ranji Trophy, with 34 dismissals in eight matches. He was also the leading wicket-taker for Delhi in the 2018–19 Vijay Hazare Trophy, with sixteen dismissals in eight matches. In October 2018, he was named in India C's squad for the 2018–19 Deodhar Trophy. The following month, he was named as one of eight players to watch ahead of the 2018–19 Ranji Trophy.

In February 2022, he was bought by the Rajasthan Royals in the 2022 Indian Premier League auction. In July 2022, he signed a short-term deal with Kent to play up to three County Championship and five One-Day Cup matches in England. He made his debut against Warwickshire and took seven wickets, including a five-wicket haul in the first innings.

In the Duleep Trophy 2024, he further showcased his prowess as part of Team India B. Musheer Khan and Navdeep Saini set a new record for the highest 8th wicket partnership against India A. Saini played a pivotal role, scoring 56 off 144 balls with 8 fours and 1 six, helping India B reach a total of 321 by the end of their first innings.

In March 2026, he was signed by the Kolkata Knight Riders as an injury replacement for Harshit Rana.

== International career ==
In June 2018, he was added to India's Test squad for their one-off match against Afghanistan as a replacement for Mohammed Shami, but he did not play. In April 2019, he was named as a standby bowler for the 2019 Cricket World Cup.

In July 2019, he was named in India's One Day International (ODI) and Twenty20 International (T20I) squads for their series against the West Indies. He made his T20I debut against the West Indies on 3 August 2019. He took three wickets from his four overs, including Nicholas Pooran and Shimron Hetmyer in two consecutive deliveries. He bowled a wicket-maiden in the last over of the innings, dismissing Kieron Pollard. He was named the man of the match. In December 2019, he was added to India's One Day International (ODI) squad for their home series against the West Indies. He made his ODI debut for India, also against the West Indies, on 22 December 2019. In February 2020, he was named in India's Test squad for their series against New Zealand. In October 2020, he was again named in India's Test squad, this time for their series against Australia. However, Saini could not play the whole tour due to a back spasm. He made his Test debut for India on 7 January 2021, against Australia, taking the wicket of fellow debutant Will Pucovski, as his maiden dismissal in Test cricket.
