= Khary Pierre =

West Indian cricketer

Personal information
- Born: 22 September 1991 (age 35)
- Batting: Left-handed
- Bowling: Slow left-arm orthodox
- Role: Allrounder

International information
- National side: West Indies (2018–present)
- Test debut (cap 346): 2 October 2025 v India
- Last Test: 10 October 2025 v India
- ODI debut (cap 196): 18 December 2019 v India
- Last ODI: 22 November 2025 v New Zealand
- T20I debut (cap 76): 4 November 2018 v India
- Last T20I: 31 October 2025 v Bangladesh

Domestic team information
- Years: Team
- 2016–present: Trinidad and Tobago
- 2017–2022: Trinbago Knight Riders
- 2023–present: St Lucia Kings
- 2025/26: Abu Dhabi Knight Riders

Career statistics
Competition	Test	ODI	T20I	FC
Matches	2	7	13	37
Runs scored	47	70	17	954
Batting average	15.66	35.00	5.66	21.20
100s/50s	0/0	0/0	0/0	1/1
Top score	23	22*	9*	106*
Balls bowled	402	336	216	6483
Wickets	1	2	10	112
Bowling average	246.00	133.00	33.80	24.80
5 wickets in innings	0	0	0	4
10 wickets in match	0	–	–	1
Best bowling	1/91	1/19	2/23	8/27
Catches/stumpings	0/–	6/–	3/–	29/–
- Source: ESPNcricinfo, 1 January 2026

Khary Pierre (born 22 September 1991) is a Trinidadian cricketer. He made his international debut for the West Indies cricket team in November 2018.

== Domestic career ==
He made his first-class debut for Trinidad and Tobago in the 2016–17 Regional Four Day Competition on 25 November 2016. He made his List A debut for Trinidad and Tobago in the 2016–17 Regional Super50 on 31 January 2017. He made his Twenty20 debut for Trinbago Knight Riders in the 2017 Caribbean Premier League on 4 August 2017.

In June 2018, he was named in the Cricket West Indies B Team squad for the inaugural edition of the Global T20 Canada tournament. In July 2020, he was named in the Trinbago Knight Riders squad for the 2020 Caribbean Premier League.

== International career ==
In October 2018, he was named in the West Indies' Twenty20 International (T20I) squad for series against India. He made his T20I debut for the West Indies against India on 4 November 2018. In May 2019, Cricket West Indies (CWI) named him as one of ten reserve players in the West Indies' squad for the 2019 Cricket World Cup.

In November 2019, he was named in the West Indies' One Day International (ODI) squad for the series against India. He made his ODI debut for the West Indies against India on 18 December 2019.
