= Delorn Johnson =

West Indian cricketer (born 1988)

Personal information
- Full name: Delorn Edison Johnson
- Born: 15 September 1988 (age 38); St. Vincent
- Batting: Left-handed
- Bowling: Left-arm fast
- Role: Bowler

Domestic team information
- Years: Team
- 2010/11–present: Windward Islands
- 2013–present: Trinidad & Tobago Red Steel
- 2016–present: St Lucia Zouks

Career statistics
Competition	FC	LA	T20
Matches	42	30	21
Runs scored	526	153	12
Batting average	11.19	12.75	4.00
100s/50s	0/2	0/0	0/0
Top score	56	26*	5*
Balls bowled	5,662	1330	431
Wickets	112	42	32
Bowling average	25.27	25.40	17.25
5 wickets in innings	2	1	1
10 wickets in match	0	0	0
Best bowling	6/34	6/37	5/5
Catches/stumpings	26/–	7/–	7/–
- Source: Cricinfo, 9 April 2017

Delorn Edison Johnson (born 15 September 1988) is a cricketer from St. Vincent. He is a left-arm fast bowler who plays first-class cricket for Windward Islands. He has played for West Indies Under-19 cricket team and West Indies A cricket team.
