= Obed McCoy =

West Indian cricketer

Personal information
- Full name: Obed Christopher McCoy
- Born: 4 January 1997 (age 29)
- Batting: Left-handed
- Bowling: Left-arm fast-medium
- Role: Bowler

International information
- National side: West Indies (2018–present)
- ODI debut (cap 187): 24 October 2018 v India
- Last ODI: 27 October 2018 v India
- T20I debut (cap 79): 8 March 2019 v England
- Last T20I: 27 September 2025 v Nepal

Domestic team information
- Years: Team
- 2017–present: Windward Islands
- 2017–2021: St Lucia Kings
- 2022–2023: Rajasthan Royals
- 2022: Sussex
- 2022–2024: Barbados Royals
- 2023: Fortune Barishal
- 2024: Paarl Royals
- 2025: Antigua & Barbuda Falcons

Career statistics
Competition	ODI	T20I	FC	LA
Matches	2	43	4	20
Runs scored	0	68	15	70
Batting average	–	9.71	7.50	10.00
100s/50s	0/0	0/0	0/0	0/0
Top score	0*	23*	11*	14*
Balls bowled	84	826	414	623
Wickets	4	52	6	19
Bowling average	27.25	23.11	46.33	31.26
5 wickets in innings	0	1	0	0
10 wickets in match	0	0	0	0
Best bowling	2/38	6/17	3/56	2/28
Catches/stumpings	0/–	4/–	3/–	6/–
- Source: Cricinfo, 8 July 2026

Obed Christopher McCoy (born 4 January 1997) is a Vincentian professional cricketer who plays for the West Indies cricket team internationally. He made his international debut for the West Indies in October 2018.

== Domestic and T20 career ==
He made his List A debut for the West Indies Under-19s in the 2016–17 Regional Super50 on 25 January 2017. Prior to his List A debut, he was named in the West Indies squad for the 2016 Under-19 Cricket World Cup squads.

He made his Twenty20 debut for St Lucia Stars in the 2017 Caribbean Premier League on 4 August 2017. He made his first-class debut for the Windward Islands in the 2017–18 Regional Four Day Competition on 2 November 2017.

In June 2018, he was named in the Cricket West Indies B Team squad for the inaugural edition of the Global T20 Canada tournament. He was the leading wicket-taker in the tournament for the Cricket West Indies B Team, with eleven dismissals in seven matches. In July 2020, he was named in the St Lucia Zouks squad for the 2020 Caribbean Premier League.

In April 2021, he was signed by Multan Sultans to play in the rescheduled matches in the 2021 Pakistan Super League. In February 2022, he was bought by the Rajasthan Royals in the auction for the 2022 Indian Premier League tournament. In June 2022, in his first match for Sussex, McCoy took his first five-wicket haul in Twenty20 cricket, against Somerset in the 2022 T20 Blast in England.

== International career ==
In October 2018, he was named in the West Indies' One Day International (ODI) squad for series against India. He made his ODI debut for the West Indies against India on 24 October 2018. In March 2019, he was added to the West Indies' Twenty20 International (T20I) squad for the series against England. He made his T20I debut for the West Indies against England on 8 March 2019.

In September 2021, McCoy was named in the West Indies' squad for the 2021 ICC Men's T20 World Cup.

On 1 August 2022, McCoy recorded career best bowling figures of 6–17 against India. These are the best bowling figures by a West Indies player in the T20I format. These are also the best bowling figures for any team against India in the T20I format. Two matches later, on 6 August 2022, McCoy recorded the most expensive bowling figures for a West Indies player in the T20I format with figures of 2-66.
