= Imran Khan (Trinidad and Tobago cricketer) =

Trinidad and Tobago cricketer (born 1984)

Personal information
- Born: 6 July 1984 (age 42); Port-of-Spain, Trinidad and Tobago
- Batting: Right-handed
- Bowling: Right arm leg break
- Role: All-rounder

Domestic team information
- Years: Team
- 2005–present: Trinidad and Tobago
- 2015-2019: Barbados Tridents
- 2019-2020: Jamaica Tallawahs
- 2020-: St Kitts and Nevis Patriots

Career statistics
Competition	FC	LA	T20
Matches	110	53	39
Runs scored	3,584	381	154
Batting average	21.46	17.31	19.25
100s/50s	1/15	0/1	0/1
Top score	125	74	60*
Balls bowled	19,826	2,333	597
Wickets	437	71	31
Bowling average	23.03	25.67	20.22
5 wickets in innings	25	1	0
10 wickets in match	6	0	0
Best bowling	7/47	5/32	3/7
Catches/stumpings	82/–	12/–	10/–
- Source: Cricinfo, 23 February 2023

Imran Khan (born 6 July 1984 in Port of Spain) is a Trinidadian cricketer who plays as a right arm leg spinner. Khan has mainly featured for Trinidad and Tobago in first-class and list-A matches. He has also played for Caribbean Premier League teams Barbados Tridents, Jamaica Tallawahs and the St Kitts and Nevis Patriots.

== First class career ==
Since 2005 Khan has featured for Trinidad and Tobago in first-class and list-A regional cricketing tournaments. He started off as an opening batsman but was soon encouraged by Brian Lara to become a full time leg-spinner. In November 2019, he was named as T&T's captain for the upcoming Regional Super50 tournament. Khan was later named, in February 2022, T&T's skipper for the 2021-22 West Indies Championship, the regional first-class tournament. He has gone on to play more than 100 matches and pick up over 400 wickets in first class cricket.

== T20 career ==
Khan became a part of the Barbados Tridents for the upcoming 2016 Caribbean Premier League season. In May 2019 Khan joined CPL team Jamaica Tallawahs. He later signed up with Caribbean Premier League side St Kitts and Nevis Patriots in August 2020.
