= Romario Shepherd =

Guyanese cricketer (born 1994)

Personal information
- Born: 26 November 1994 (age 31); Georgetown, Guyana
- Batting: Right-handed
- Bowling: Right-arm fast-medium
- Role: Bowling All-rounder

International information
- National side: West Indies (2019-present)
- ODI debut (cap 193): 6 November 2019 v Afghanistan
- Last ODI: 19 November 2025 v New Zealand
- T20I debut (cap 83): 18 January 2020 v Ireland
- Last T20I: 26 February 2026 v South Africa

Domestic team information
- Years: Team
- 2016–present: Guyana
- 2018–present: Guyana Amazon Warriors
- 2022: Sunrisers Hyderabad
- 2023–2024: Joburg Super Kings
- 2023: Lucknow Super Giants
- 2024: Chattogram Challengers
- 2024: Mumbai Indians
- 2025 - present: Royal Challengers Bengaluru

Career statistics
Competition	ODI	T20I	LA	T20
Matches	42	78	83	231
Runs scored	455	909	999	2,545
Batting average	17.50	28.40	20.81	24.95
100s/50s	0/1	0/1	0/4	0/7
Top score	50	52*	74*	73*
Balls bowled	1,564	1,318	3,299	3,612
Wickets	34	81	90	212
Bowling average	42.05	27.02	33.67	26.17
5 wickets in innings	0	0	0	1
10 wickets in match	0	0	0	0
Best bowling	3/37	4/31	4/19	5/20
Catches/stumpings	5/–	14/–	15/–	50/–
- Source: Cricinfo, 26 February 2026

Romario Shepherd (born 26 November 1994) is a Guyanese cricketer who plays for Guyana in domestic cricket and for West Indies in international cricket. He made his international debut for West Indies in November 2019.

== Domestic and franchise career ==
A right-arm fast bowler, Shepherd made his List A debut for Guyana in January 2016, playing against the Leeward Islands in the 2015–16 Regional Super50. Opening the bowling with Steven Jacobs, he took 3/37 from 10 overs on debut, including the first two wickets to fall, and was named man of the match. He made his first-class debut for Guyana in the 2016–17 Regional Four Day Competition on 10 March 2017. He made his Twenty20 debut for Guyana Amazon Warriors in the tournament on 5 September 2018.

In July 2020, Shepherd was named in the Guyana Amazon Warriors squad for the 2020 Caribbean Premier League. In December 2021, he was signed by the Karachi Kings following the players' draft for the 2022 Pakistan Super League. In February 2022, he was bought by the Sunrisers Hyderabad in the auction for the 2022 season of the Indian Premier League (IPL). He was selected to play for Chattogram Challengers in the 2024 Bangladesh Premier League.

Ahead of the 2025 edition of the IPL, Shepherd was bought by Royal Challengers Bengaluru (RCB) at his base price of ₹1.5 crore. In a home fixture against Chennai Super Kings, he scored a half-century off 14 balls, the fastest ever by an RCB player, and the joint second-fastest in IPL history. He scored 32 runs off Khaleel Ahmed in the 19th over, before scoring 20 off Matheesha Pathirana, the final over of RCB's innings, helping them post an eventual winning total of 213.

== International career ==
In October 2019, Shepherd was named in the West Indies One Day International (ODI) squad for their series against Afghanistan. He made his ODI debut for the West Indies, against Afghanistan, on 6 November 2019. In January 2020, he was named in the West Indies Twenty20 International (T20I) squad for their series against Ireland. He made his T20I debut for the West Indies, against Ireland, on 18 January 2020. In November 2023, he was named in the ODI squad of West Indies for the 3-match ODI series against England. In the first ODI, he scored 48 runs off 28 balls and picked up 2 wicket for 77 runs.

In May 2024, he was named in the West Indies squad for the 2024 ICC Men's T20 World Cup tournament.

In Jan 2026, he was named in the West Indies squad for the 2026 ICC Men's T20 World Cup tournament.
