= Johnson Charles =

Saint Lucian cricketer (born 1989)

Personal information
- Born: 14 January 1989 (age 37); Castries, St. Lucia
- Batting: Right-handed
- Role: Wicket-keeper batter

International information
- National side: West Indies (2011–present)
- ODI debut (cap 164): 16 March 2012 v Australia
- Last ODI: 7 July 2023 v Sri Lanka
- T20I debut (cap 48): 23 September 2011 v England
- Last T20I: 10 June 2025 v England

Domestic team information
- Years: Team
- 2007/08: St Lucia
- 2008/09–present: Windward Islands
- 2013: Antigua Hawksbills
- 2014–2017: St Lucia Stars
- 2017: Rangpur Riders
- 2018: Jamaica Tallawahs
- 2019–2025: Multan Sultans
- 2019–2020: Barbados Royals
- 2022–2024: St Lucia Kings
- 2022/23–2023/24: Comilla Victorians

Career statistics
Competition	ODI	T20I	FC	LA
Matches	58	60	35	120
Runs scored	1,537	1,359	1,227	2,921
Batting average	26.5	23.08	20.79	24.34
100s/50s	2/7	1/5	1/3	3/13
Top score	130	118	151	177
Balls bowled	5	–	240	131
Wickets	–	–	5	3
Bowling average	–	–	33.40	55.00
5 wickets in innings	–	–	0	0
10 wickets in match	–	–	0	0
Best bowling	–	–	2/14	1/22
Catches/stumpings	25/2	22/2	61/–	50/5
Medal record
Men's Cricket
Representing West Indies
ICC Men's T20 World Cup
Winner	2012 Sri Lanka
Winner	2016 India
- Source: ESPNcricinfo, 29 December 2024

Johnson Charles (born 14 January 1989) is a St Lucian international cricketer who plays for the West Indies. As a wicket-keeper-batsman, Charles started his ODI career against Australia in March 2012. His first T20I came against England in September 2011, and he became just the second cricketer from the island of St Lucia to play for the West Indies (the first was Darren Sammy, who was captain in Charles' international debut). Johnson was included in the West Indies' 15-man squad for the 2012 ICC World Twenty20 held in September and October that year, where the team won the tournament. Charles was also a member of the West Indies team that won the 2016 T20 World Cup.

== Early life ==
Charles was raised in the Seventh-day Adventist Church by his parents.

== Domestic and T20 franchise career ==
Charles played his first twenty20 match in January 2008, representing Saint Lucia in the Stanford Twenty20. Opening the batting with Keddy Lesporis, Charles managed scores of 2 and 21 from the only matches he played in the competition. Later that year he debuted for the Windward Islands in the West Indies Board Cup, the regional one-day tournament. His performances were not sufficient to secure a place in the team's one-day side, and in 2009 Charles played neither List A nor twenty20 cricket. However, he made his first-class debut in January that year and played eight matches for the Windward Islands in the Regional Four Day Competition. In 16 visits to the crease he accumulated 292 runs, including a single half-century, putting him seventh in the team's list of leading run-scorers in that year's competition.

Charles did not represent the Windward Islands in the 2009/10 Regional Four Day Competition, but in 2010 he returned to the List A side for the West Indies Board Cup, and played his first twenty20 match for the team. In the first match of the Caribbean T20, Charles opened the batting with Devon Smith and exploited several reprieves (Charles was dropped three times and nearly run out) to score his first half-century in the format.

Charles was eventually named in Cricinfo's best XI of the 2016 Caribbean Premier League. On 3 June 2018, he was selected to play for the Toronto Nationals in the players' draft for the inaugural edition of the Global T20 Canada tournament. In November 2019, he was selected to play for the Sylhet Thunder in the 2019–20 Bangladesh Premier League. In July 2020, he was named in the Barbados Tridents squad for the 2020 Caribbean Premier League. He later replaced Ravi Bopara in the Jaffna Stallions squad for the inaugural Lanka Premier League season. On 16 December 2020, Charles scored a cameo 26 with six fours from 15 balls, to help the Stallions prevail over the Galle Gladiators to claim the 2020 LPL title. He was later named in Cricinfo's team of the 2022 Caribbean Premier League.

== International career ==
Having been selected in the West Indies squad for the 2012 Twenty20, Charles opened the bat with Chris Gayle in the third match (he batted after the fall of the first wicket in the West Indies opening match and in the second did not bat as the match was rained off). After building a century partnership with Gayle, Charles (who was described by ESPNCricinfo as having "little obvious pedigree as an opening batsman") went on to score 84 to help his team to victory against England. It was his highest score in first-class, List A, or even twenty20 cricket. The following month Charles was dropped from the West Indies squad to face Bangladesh in a five-match ODI series. He scored his maiden ODI century, 100 with eight fours and a six, in the 5th ODI of the Windies' 2012–13 tour of Australia played at the Melbourne Cricket Ground.

Charles was also a part of the Windies side that won the 2016 T20 World Cup. On 26 March 2023, in the second T20I against South Africa, Charles scored his maiden century in T20I cricket, notching 118 runs off just 46 balls. As he got to his 100 from just 39 balls, then and there, he scored the fastest T20I century by a West Indian cricketer and the joint second fastest T20I century of all time. Charles was later named as the man of the series, where the West Indies defeated the Proteas by a 2 to 1 margin.

In May 2024, he was named in the West Indies squad for the 2024 ICC Men's T20 World Cup tournament.

== Accolades ==
A stand at the Darren Sammy Stadium was renamed in Charles' honour.
