= Christopher Powell (cricketer) =

Jamaican cricketer (born 1994)

Personal information
- Full name: Christopher Michael Powell
- Born: 9 December 1994 (age 31); Manchester Parish, Jamaica
- Batting: Right-handed
- Bowling: Right-arm fast-medium

Domestic team information
- Years: Team
- 2015–2016: Combined Campuses
- Source: CricketArchive, 2 January 2016

Christopher Michael Powell (born 9 December 1994) is a Jamaican cricketer who has played for the Combined Campuses and Colleges in West Indian domestic cricket. He is a right-arm fast-medium bowler.

Powell made his List A debut in January 2015, playing for the Combined Campuses against Guyana in the 2014–15 Regional Super50. On debut, he opened the bowling with Kyle Mayers, taking 1/40 from nine overs. While batting, he came in to bat with the score at 112/8, and proceeded to score 27 not out from 29 balls, taking his team to a one-wicket victory. In his next match for the team, a semi-final against Trinidad and Tobago, Powell took 5/22 from seven overs, although his performance was not enough to secure a win.
