= Sunil Ambris =

West Indian cricketer (born 1993)

Personal information
- Full name: Sunil Walford Ambris
- Born: 23 March 1993 (age 33); Saint Vincent, Saint Vincent and the Grenadines
- Batting: Right-handed
- Role: Batter
- Relatives: Romel Currency (half-brother)

International information
- National side: West Indies (2017–2021)
- Test debut (cap 313): 1 December 2017 v New Zealand
- Last Test: 30 November 2018 v Bangladesh
- ODI debut (cap 181): 29 September 2017 v England
- Last ODI: 25 January 2021 v Bangladesh

Domestic team information
- Years: Team
- 2012/13: Combined Campuses and Colleges
- 2013/14–present: Windward Islands
- 2014: St Lucia Zouks
- 2017: St Lucia Stars

Career statistics
Competition	Tests	ODI	FC	LA
Matches	6	16	60	56
Runs scored	166	473	3,098	1,744
Batting average	15.10	36.38	30.98	37.91
100s/50s	0/0	1/2	7/14	1/13
Top score	43	148	231	148
Catches/stumpings	2/–	2/–	77/3	25/1
- Source: ESPNcricinfo, 10 October 2021

Sunil Walford Ambris (born 23 March 1993) is a Vincentian professional cricketer who has represented the West Indies in Tests and ODIs. He currently captains the Windward Islands and has also represented Combined Campuses and Colleges in West Indian domestic cricket, as well as representing the St Lucia Zouks in the Caribbean Premier League (CPL). He was the first player to be dismissed hit-wicket twice in consecutive Tests and the first to be dismissed hit-wicket on Test debut.

== Domestic career ==
At the 2012–13 Caribbean Twenty20, Ambris played two matches for the Combined Campuses, against the Leeward Islands and Jamaica. His first-class debut came during the 2013–14 Regional Four Day Competition, when he played for the Windward Islands against Guyana. In his first innings, Ambris scored 114 runs from 200 balls, eventually being named man of the match. He finished his debut season with 468 runs from six matches, making him the Windwards' leading run-scorer behind Devon Smith.

In March 2017, during the 2016–17 Regional Four Day Competition, he scored a double century for the Windward Islands against the Leeward Islands. In the 2016–17 Regional Super50, he was the top run-scorer for the Windward Islands, scoring more than double the number of runs of any of his teammates, with 423 in total.

In October 2018, Cricket West Indies (CWI) awarded him a development contract for the 2018–19 season.

== International career ==
Ambris played for the West Indies under-19s at the 2012 Under-19 World Cup in Australia. Against Papua New Guinea, he scored 91 from 43 balls, including nine fours and seven sixes.

In June 2017, he was added to the West Indies One Day International (ODI) squad, ahead of the third match against India, but he did not play. He made his ODI debut for the West Indies against England on 29 September 2017, scoring an unbeaten 38 from 27 balls.

In November 2017, he was named in the West Indies Test squad for their series against New Zealand. He made his Test debut for the West Indies against New Zealand on 1 December 2017 and became the sixth batsmen to be out hit wicket off the first ball, and the first to be dismissed in this manner on Test debut. In the second innings, he opened his account with a six and became only the sixth batsman in Test cricket to do so. On 10 December 2017, he got out hit wicket again in the first innings of the second Test against New Zealand and became the first player to be dismissed hit-wicket twice in consecutive Tests. In the second innings, he retired hurt (not out) after he fractured his forearm.

In May 2019, Cricket West Indies (CWI) named him as one of ten reserve players in the West Indies' squad for the 2019 Cricket World Cup. On 24 June 2019, Ambris was added to the West Indies's squad, after Andre Russell was ruled out of the team with a knee injury.

In June 2020, Ambris was named as one of eleven reserve players in the West Indies' Test squad, for their series against England. The Test series was originally scheduled to start in May 2020, but was moved back to July 2020 due to the COVID-19 pandemic.
