= Patrick Gustard =

Cricket umpire

Personal information
- Full name: Patrick Antony Gustard
- Born: 14 September 1971 (age 55); Clarendon, Jamaica
- Role: Umpire

Umpiring information
- T20Is umpired: 22 (2020–2024)
- WODIs umpired: 6 (2013–2019)
- WT20Is umpired: 6 (2019–2022)
- Source: Cricinfo, 14 August 2022

Patrick Gustard (born 14 September 1971) is a Jamaican cricket umpire. He stood in matches in the 2016–17 Regional Four Day Competition and the 2016–17 Regional Super50. Gustard made his Twenty20 International (T20I) umpiring debut on 15 January 2020, in a match between the West Indies and Ireland.

== See also ==
- List of Twenty20 International cricket umpires
