= Sheldon Cottrell =

West Indian cricketer

Personal information
- Full name: Sheldon Shane Cottrell
- Born: 19 August 1989 (age 37); Kingston, Jamaica
- Nickname: Colonel
- Height: 1.91 m (6 ft 3 in)
- Batting: Right-handed
- Bowling: Left-arm fast-medium
- Role: Bowler

International information
- National side: West Indies (2013-2023)
- Test debut (cap 297): 6 November 2013 v India
- Last Test: 20 December 2014 v South Africa
- ODI debut (cap 169): 25 January 2015 v South Africa
- Last ODI: 26 July 2021 v Australia
- ODI shirt no.: 19
- T20I debut (cap 62): 13 March 2014 v England
- Last T20I: 28 March 2023 v South Africa
- T20I shirt no.: 19

Domestic team information
- Years: Team
- 2010–2016: Jamaica
- 2016–2018: Trinidad and Tobago
- 2013–2014: Antigua Hawksbills
- 2015–present: St Kitts and Nevis Patriots
- 2018–present: Leeward Islands
- 2019: Rangpur Riders
- 2019–20: Sylhet Thunder
- 2020: Kings XI Punjab
- 2023: Multan Sultans

Career statistics
Competition	ODI	T20I	LA	T20
Matches	38	42	71	130
Runs scored	88	18	241	189
Batting average	11.00	4.50	13.38	7.26
100s/50s	0/0	0/0	0/0	0/0
Top score	17	4*	30	26*
Balls bowled	1,722	876	3,164	2,707
Wickets	52	50	103	159
Bowling average	32.40	23.20	27.63	21.83
5 wickets in innings	1	0	1	0
10 wickets in match	0	0	0	0
Best bowling	5/46	4/28	5/46	4/20
Catches/stumpings	19/–	16/–	25/–	54/–
- Source: ESPNcricinfo, 1 May 2023

Sheldon Shane Cottrell (born 19 August 1989) is a Jamaican international cricketer who plays for the West Indies cricket team. He is a left-arm fast-medium bowler and a right-handed batsman.

== Early life ==
Before starting his cricket career, he stated in an interview that he was once a soldier of Jamaica Defence Force and that's the reason that Sheldon Cottrell performs salutes or tributes as a sign of celebration most of the time whenever he gets any of the wickets, in a perfect military style.

== Career ==
In first class cricket, Cottrell plays for Leeward Islands. He made his Test Debut in November 2013 against India at Eden Gardens, Calcutta in the penultimate Test of Sachin Tendulkar. He is known to march and salute to the pavilion followed by opening his arms to the heavens (formerly a dab) after every wicket as he is a Jamaica Defence Force soldier, and was among the army workforce manning the pitch during the fifth ODI against India at Sabina Park in 2011.

He made his T20I debut against England in March 2014. He made his One Day International debut for the West Indies against South Africa on 25 January 2015. Cottrell was a part of the 2015 West Indies World Cup squad, and returned to the ODI side on 23 December 2017 against New Zealand after a 2-year absence.

In May 2018, he was selected to play for the Leeward Islands national cricket team in the Professional Cricket League draft, ahead of the 2018–19 season. On 3 June 2018, he was selected to play for the Vancouver Knights in the players' draft for the inaugural edition of the Global T20 Canada tournament. He was the leading wicket-taker in the tournament, with sixteen dismissals in eight matches.

In April 2019, he was named in the West Indies' squad for the 2019 Cricket World Cup. He finished the tournament as the leading wicket-taker for the West Indies, with twelve dismissals in nine matches. In the 2020 IPL auction, he was bought by the Kings XI Punjab ahead of the 2020 Indian Premier League. He was later released by Kings XI Punjab ahead of 2021 Indian Premier League.

In July 2020, he was named in the St Kitts & Nevis Patriots squad for the 2020 Caribbean Premier League.

In September 2021, Cottrell was named as one of four reserve players in the West Indies' squad for the 2021 ICC Men's T20 World Cup. In July 2022, he was signed by the Dambulla Giants for the third edition of the Lanka Premier League.
