= Saint Lucia Kings =

T20 franchise based in Saint Lucia

- St Lucia Zouks (2013–2016, 2019–2020); St Lucia Stars (2017–2018)
- Official logo of the Saint Lucia Kings
- Nickname: beinspired

Personnel
- Captain: Roston Chase
- Coach: Daren Sammy
- Overseas players: Noor Ahmad; Tim Seifert; Maheesh Theekshana; Charith Asalanka; Shadley van Schalkwyk
- Owner: Mohit Burman; Karan Paul, Ness Wadia; Preity Zinta; Punjab Kings

Team information
- Colours: Blue; Yellow; Black; White
- Founded: 2013; 13 years ago
- Home ground: Daren Sammy Cricket Ground
- Capacity: 15,000

History
- CPL wins: 1 (2024)
- Official website: www.saintluciakings.com
T20I kit

Kings Group

Current Teams
- Punjab Kings (2008–present); Saint Lucia Kings(2021–present)

The Saint Lucia Kings, are the representative team of Saint Lucia in the Caribbean Premier League (CPL) of cricket. They were created in 2013 as one of the six teams for the inaugural season of the tournament. After minimal success in early seasons, the Kings won their first title in 2024, defeating the Guyana Amazon Warriors. They adopted their current moniker in 2021 after being acquired by the ownership of the IPL's Punjab Kings.

For the 2017 season, the franchise chose to rebrand under a new name and logo as the Saint Lucia Stars. In 2018, they finished fifth in Caribbean Premier League winning three out of their ten matches. In 2019, they finished fifth again and narrowly missed out on a semi-final spot. In both 2020 and 2021, Saint Lucia finished as runners-up.

== Current squad ==
- Players with international caps are listed in **bold**.

As of 29 July 2026

No.	Name	Nat.	Birth date	Batting style	Bowling style	Year signed	Notes
Batsman
—N/a	**Ackeem Auguste**	Saint Lucia	12 September 2003 (age 22)	Left-handed	Right-arm off spin	2025	
—N/a	Johann Jeremiah	Grenada	2 October 1999 (age 26)	Left-handed	Right-arm off spin	2025	
	Kamil Pooran	Trinidad and Tobago	13 June 1996 (age 30)	Right-handed	Right arm medium	2026	
All-rounders
10	**Roston Chase**	Barbados	22 March 1992 (age 34)	Right-handed	Right-arm off spin	2020	
—N/a	Shadrack Descarte	Saint Lucia	18 October 1997 (age 28)	Left-handed	Right-arm medium-fast	2023	
—N/a	Javelle Glen	Jamaica	26 February 1998 (age 28)	Left-handed	Right-arm leg spin	2025	
—N/a	**Khary Pierre**	Trinidad and Tobago	22 September 1991 (age 34)	Left-handed	Left-arm orthodox	2023	
72	**Charith Asalanka**	Sri Lanka	29 June 1997 (age 29)	Left-handed	Right-arm Off Spin	2026	Overseas
Wicket-keepers
43	**Tim Seifert**	New Zealand	14 December 1994 (age 31)	Right-handed		2025	Overseas
Spin bowlers
—N/a	Micah McKenzie	Antigua and Barbuda	18 January 2007 (age 19)	Right-handed	Right-arm leg spin	2025	
61	**Maheesh Theekshana**	Sri Lanka	1 August 2000 (age 26)	Right-handed	Right arm Off break	2026	Overseas
15	**Noor Ahmad**	Afghanistan	3 January 2005 (age 21)	Right-handed	Left-arm unorthodox	2026	Overseas
Pace bowlers
—N/a	**Matthew Forde**	Barbados	29 April 2002 (age 24)	Right-handed	Right arm medium	2022	
37	**Shadley van Schalkwyk**	United States	15 August 1988 (age 38)	Right-handed	Right arm medium	2026	
—N/a	Keon Gaston	Saint Lucia	9 June 2003 (age 23)	Right-handed	Right arm medium	2025	
—N/a	**Alzarri Joseph**	Antigua and Barbuda	20 November 1996 (age 29)	Right-handed	Right-arm medium-fast	2021	

- Source: St Lucia Kings players

== Result summary ==
As of 30 August 2023

CPL summary of results
Year	Played	Wins	Losses	Tied	NR	Win %	Position
2013	7	2	5	0	0	28.57%	6/6
2014	9	2	7	0	0	22.22%	5/6
2015	10	4	5	0	1	40%	5/6
2016	10	6	4	0	0	60%	3/6
2017	10	0	9	0	1	0%	6/6
2018	10	3	6	0	1	30%	5/6
2019	10	3	6	0	1	30%	5/6
2020	10	6	4	0	0	60%	3/6
2021	10	5	5	0	0	50%	4/6
2022	10	4	5	0	1	40%	3/6
2023	10	4	4	0	2	40%	3/6
2024 (WINNERS)	10	7	3	0	0	70%	2/6
Total	116	46	63	0	7	42.22%	

- Source: ESPNcricinfo
- Abandoned matches are counted as NR (no result)
- Win or loss by super over or boundary count are counted as tied.
- Tied+Win - Counted as a win and Tied+Loss - Counted as a loss.
- NR indicates no result.

== Administration and support staff ==
Position	Name
Team manager	Rawl Lewis
Head coach	Daren Sammy

== Player statistics ==
As of 30 September 2022

=== Most runs ===
Player	Seasons	Runs
Andre Fletcher	2013–2021	2,310
Johnson Charles	2014–2017, 2022	1,382
Daren Sammy	2013–2014, 2016–2020	898
Rahkeem Cornwall	2017–2021	819
Roston Chase	2020–2022	771

- Source: ESPNcricinfo

=== Most wickets ===
Player	Seasons	Wickets
Kesrick Williams	2018–2022	51
Alzarri Joseph	2021–2022	27
Obed McCoy	2017–2021	26
Roston Chase	2017–2022	25
Shane Shillingford	2013–2017	25

- Source: ESPNcricinfo

== Seasons ==
=== Caribbean Premier League ===
Year	League standing	Final standing
2013	6th out of 6	League stage
2014	5th out of 6	League stage
2015	5th out of 6	League stage
2016	3rd out of 6	Eliminator
2017	6th out of 6	League stage
2018	5th out of 6	League stage
2019	5th out of 6	League stage
2020	3rd out of 6	Runners-up
2021	4th out of 6	Runners-up
2022	3rd out of 6	Eliminator
2023	3rd out of 6	Eliminator
2024	2nd out of 6	Champions

=== The 6ixty ===
Season	League standing	Final position
2022	5th out of 6	League stage

== See also ==
- List of St Lucia Kings cricketers
