= List of West Indies Twenty20 International cricket records =

A Twenty20 International (T20I) is a form of cricket, played between two of the international members of the International Cricket Council (ICC), in which each team faces a maximum of twenty overs. The matches have top-class status and are the highest T20 standard. The game is played under the rules of Twenty20 cricket. The first Twenty20 International match between two men's sides was played on 17 February 2005, involving Australia and New Zealand. Wisden Cricketers' Almanack reported that "neither side took the game especially seriously", and it was noted by Cricinfo that but for a large score for Ricky Ponting, "the concept would have shuddered". However, Ponting himself said "if it does become an international game then I'm sure the novelty won't be there all the time". This is a list of West Indies Cricket team's Twenty20 International records. It is based on the List of Twenty20 International records, but concentrates solely on records dealing with the West Indian cricket team. West Indies played the first ever T20I in 2006.

== Key ==
The top five records are listed for each category, except for the team wins, losses, draws and ties, all round records and the partnership records. Tied records for fifth place are also included. Explanations of the general symbols and cricketing terms used in the list are given below. Specific details are provided in each category where appropriate. All records include matches played for West Indies only, and are correct as of August 2020.

Key
Symbol	Meaning
†	Player or umpire is currently active in T20I cricket
‡	Even took place during a Cricket World Cup
*	Player remained not out or partnership remained unbroken
♠	Twenty20 International cricket record
Date	Starting date of the match
Innings	Number of innings played
Matches	Number of matches played
Opposition	The team West Indies was playing against
Period	The time period when the player was active in ODI cricket
Player	The player involved in the record
Venue	Twenty20 International cricket ground where the match was played

== Team records ==
=== Overall Record ===
Matches	Won	Lost	Tied	NR	Win %
214	93	106	3	11	43.45
Last Updated: 16 December 2024

=== Team wins, losses, draws and ties ===
As of May 2024, West Indies has played 195 T20I matches resulting in 83 victories, 99 defeats, 3 ties and 10 no results for an overall winning percentage of 45.60.

Opponent	Matches	Won	Lost	Tied	No Result	% Won
Full Members
Afghanistan	11	6	5	0	0	54.54
Australia	27	11	16	0	0	40.74
Bangladesh	25	12	11	0	2	64.28
England	39	19	19	0	0	50.00
India	32	10	21	0	1	31.25
Ireland	9	4	3	0	2	50.00
New Zealand	25	5	14	3	3	20.00
Pakistan	24	4	17	0	3	16.66
South Africa	30	15	15	0	0	50.00
Sri Lanka	18	8	10	0	0	44.44
Zimbabwe	5	4	1	0	0	75.00
Associate Members
ICC	1	1	0	0	0	100
Italy	1	1	0	0	0	0
Nepal	4	2	2	0	0	50
Papua New Guinea	1	1	0	0	0	100
Scotland	2	1	1	0	0	50
Uganda	1	1	0	0	0	100
United States	1	1	0	0	0	100
Total	252	109	131	3	12	43.25
Statistics are correct as of West Indies v India at Eden Gardens, India; 1st March 2026

=== First bilateral T20I series wins ===
Opponent	Year of first Home win	Year of first Away win
Afghanistan	2017	-
Australia	2008	2013
Bangladesh	2009	2012
England	2009	2017
India	2016	-
Ireland	-	YTP
New Zealand	2012	-
Pakistan	2011	-
South Africa	2024	2015
Sri Lanka	2021	2020
ICC World XI	YTP	2019
Last Updated: 7 March 2021

=== First T20I match wins ===
Opponent	Home		Away / Neutral	
Opponent	Venue	Year	Venue	Year
Afghanistan	Warner Park, Basseterre, Saint Kitts and Nevis	2017	Bharat Ratna Shri Atal Bihari Vajpayee Ekana Cricket Stadium, Lucknow, India	2019
Australia	Kensington Oval, Bridgetown, Barbados	2008	The Oval, London, England	2009
Bangladesh	Warner Park, Basseterre, Saint Kitts and Nevis	2009	Sher-e-Bangla National Cricket Stadium, Mirpur, Bangladesh	2012
England	Queen's Park Oval, Port of Spain, Trinidad and Tobago	2009	The Oval, London, England	2007
India	Kensington Oval, Bridgetown, Barbados	2010	Lord's, London, England	2009
Ireland	Providence Stadium, Providence, Guyana	2010	-	
New Zealand	Central Broward Regional Park, Lauderhill, USA	2012	Pallekele International Cricket Stadium, Kandy, Sri Lanka	2012
Pakistan	Darren Sammy National Cricket Stadium, Gros Islet, Saint Lucia	2011	Sher-e-Bangla National Cricket Stadium, Mirpur, Bangladesh	2014
Papua New Guinea	Providence Stadium, Providence, Guyana	2024	YTP	
Scotland	YTP		-	
South Africa	National Cricket Stadium, Grenada	2021	Axxess DSL St. Georges, Port Elizabeth, South Africa	2007
Sri Lanka	Coolidge Cricket Ground, Saint George Parish, Antigua	2021	Ranasinghe Premadasa Stadium, Colombo, Sri Lanka	2012
Uganda	Providence Stadium, Providence, Guyana	2024	YTP	
ICC World XI	YTP	YTP	Lord's, London, England	2018
Zimbabwe	Sir Vivian Richards Stadium, St. John's, Antigua and Barbuda	2013	Bellerive Oval, Hobart, Australia	2022
Last Updated: 3 March 2021

=== Team scoring records ===
==== Most runs in an innings ====
The highest innings total scored in T20Is has been scored twice. The first occasion came in the match between Afghanistan and Ireland when Afghanistan scored 278/3 in the 2nd T20I of the Ireland series in India in February 2019. The Czech Republic national cricket team against Turkey during the 2019 Continental Cup scored 278/4 to equal the record. The highest score for West Indies is 258/5 scored against South Africa in the second T20I of the West Indies tour of South Africa in 2023 at Centurion Park, Centurion.

Rank	Score	Opposition	Venue	Date
1	258/5	South Africa	Supersports Park, Centurion, South Africa	26 March 2023
2	254/6	Zimbabwe	Wankhede Stadium, Mumbai, India	23 February 2026 ‡
3	245/6	India	Central Broward Regional Park, Lauderhill, USA	27 August 2016
4	236/6	South Africa	New Wanderers Stadium, Johannesburg, South Africa	11 January 2015
5	224/5	England	Kensington Oval, Bridgetown, Barbados	26 January 2022
Last Updated: 29 March 2023

==== Fewest runs in an innings ====
The lowest innings total scored was by Turkey against Czech Republic when they were dismissed for 21 during the 2019 Continental Cup. The lowest score in T20I history for West Indies is 45 when they were dismissed by England during the England's tour of West Indies in 2019 at the Warner Park, Basseterre, Saint Kitts and Nevis.

Rank	Score	Opposition	Venue	Date
1	45/10	England	Warner Park, Basseterre, Saint Kitts and Nevis	8 March 2019
2	55	England	Dubai International Cricket Stadium, Dubai, UAE	23 October 2021 ‡
3	60/10	Pakistan	National Stadium, Karachi, Pakistan	1 April 2018
4	71/10	England	Warner Park, Basseterre, Saint Kitts and Nevis	10 March 2019
5	79/7	Zimbabwe	Queen's Park Oval, Port of Spain, Trinidad and Tobago	28 February 2010
Last Updated: 6 November 2021

==== Most runs conceded an innings ====
West Indies conceded the most runs in T20I against South Africa in 2023 is 259/4 in second T20I match at Centurion Park, Centurion.

Rank	Score	Opposition	Venue	Date
1	267/3	England	Brian Lara Cricket Academy, San Fernando, Trinidad and Tobago	19 December 2023
2	259/4	South Africa	Supersports Park, Centurion, South Africa	26 March 2023
3	244/4	India	Central Broward Regional Park, Lauderhill, USA	27 August 2016
4	243/5	New Zealand	Bay Oval, Tauranga, New Zealand	3 January 2018
5	240/3	India	Wankhede Stadium, Mumbai, India	11 December 2019
Last Updated: 29 November 2020

==== Fewest runs conceded in an innings ====
The lowest score conceded by West Indies for a full inning is 39 when they dismissed Uganda during the 2024 ICC Men's T20 World Cup at Providence Stadium, Providence, Guyana.

Rank	Score	Opposition	Venue	Date
1	39/10	Uganda	Providence Stadium, Providence, Guyana	9 June 2024 ‡
2	68/10	Ireland	Providence Stadium, Providence, Guyana	30 April 2010 ‡
3	82/10	Pakistan	Sher-e-Bangla National Cricket Stadium, Mirpur, Bangladesh	1 April 2014 ‡
4	85/8	Ireland	Sabina Park, Kingston, Jamaica	21 February 2014
5	88/10	England	The Oval, London, England	25 September 2011
Last Updated: 9 August 2020

==== Most runs aggregate in a match ====
The highest match aggregate scored in T20Is came in the match between South Africa and West Indies in the second T20I of the West Indies tour of South Africa in 2023 at Centurion Park, Centurion when West Indies scored 258/5 in response to South Africa score of 259/4 to chase highest successful runs in T20Is.

Rank	Aggregate	Scores	Venue	Date
1	517/9	West Indies (258/5) v South Africa (259/4)	Centurion Park, Centurion, South Africa	26 March 2023
2	489/10	West Indies (245/6) v India (244/4)	Central Broward Regional Park, Lauderhill, USA	27 August 2016
3	467/13	South Africa (231/7) v West Indies (236/6)	New Wanderers Stadium, Johannesburg, South Africa	11 January 2015
4	428/14	West Indies (224/5) v England (204/9)	Kensington Oval, Bridgetown, Barbados	26 January 2022
5	416/9	West Indies (207/5) v India (209/4)	Rajiv Gandhi International Cricket Stadium, Hyderabad, India	6 December 2019
Last Updated: 30 January 2022

==== Fewest runs aggregate in a match ====
The lowest match aggregate in T20Is is 57 when Turkey were dismissed for 28 by Luxembourg in the second T20I of the 2019 Continental Cup in Romania in August 2019. The lowest match aggregate in T20I history for West Indies is 118 scored during the first T20I of West Indies tour of South Africa in 2007-08.

Rank	Aggregate	Scores	Venue	Date
1	111/14	West Indies (55) v England (56/4)	Dubai International Cricket Stadium, Dubai, UAE	23 October 2021 ‡
2	118/13	South Africa (58/8) v West Indies (60/5)	Axxess DSL St. Georges, Port Elizabeth, South Africa	16 December 2007
3	143/12	West Indies (71) v England (72/2)	Warner Park, Basseterre, Saint Kitts and Nevis	10 March 2019
4	181/17	West Indies (96/9) v Ireland (85/8)	Sabina Park, Kingston, Jamaica	21 February 2014
5	184/17	Zimbabwe (105) v West Indies (79/7)	Queen's Park Oval, Port of Spain, Trinidad and Tobago	28 February 2010
Last Updated: 6 November 2021

=== Result records ===
A T20I match is won when one side has scored more runs than the runs scored by the opposing side during their innings. If both sides have completed both their allocated innings and the side that fielded last has the higher aggregate of runs, it is known as a win by runs. This indicates the number of runs that they had scored more than the opposing side. If the side batting last wins the match, it is known as a win by wickets, indicating the number of wickets that were still to fall.

==== Greatest win margins (by runs) ====
The greatest winning margin by runs in T20Is was Czech Republic's victory over Turkey by 257 runs in the sixth match of the 2019 Continental Cup. The largest victory recorded by West Indies was during the 2014 ICC World Twenty20 by 84 runs against Pakistan.

Rank	Margin	Opposition	Venue	Date
1	134 Runs	Uganda	Providence Stadium, Providence, Guyana	9 June 2024 ‡
2	107 Runs	Zimbabwe	Wankhede Stadium, Mumbai, India	23 February 2026 ‡
3	104 Runs	Afghanistan	Daren Sammy Cricket Ground, Gros Islet, St Lucia	17 June 2024 ‡
4	84 Runs	Pakistan	Sher-e-Bangla National Cricket Stadium, Mirpur, Bangladesh	1 April 2014 ‡
5	74 Runs	Australia	Ranasinghe Premadasa Stadium, Colombo, Sri Lanka	5 October 2012 ‡
Last Updated: 9 August 2020

==== Greatest win margins (by balls remaining) ====
The greatest winning margin by balls remaining in T20Is was Austria's victory over Turkey by 104 balls remaining in the ninth match of the 2019 Continental Cup. The largest victory recorded by West Indies is during the West Indies tour of Bangladesh in 2018 when they won by 8 wickets with 55 balls remaining.

Rank	Balls remaining	Margin	Opposition	Venue	Date
1	55	8 wickets	Bangladesh	Sylhet International Cricket Stadium, Sylhet, Bangladesh	17 December 2018
2	54	9 wickets	Ireland	Warner Park, Basseterre, Saint Kitts and Nevis	19 January 2020
3	41	4 wickets	Sri Lanka	Coolidge Cricket Ground, Saint George Parish, Antigua	3 March 2021
4	31	7 wickets	Pakistan	Queen's Park Oval, Port of Spain, Trinidad and Tobago	1 April 2017
4	31	6 wickets	Australia	Darren Sammy National Cricket Stadium, Gros Islet, Saint Lucia	12 July 2021
Last Updated: 12 July 2021

==== Greatest win margins (by wickets) ====
A total of 22 matches have ended with chasing team winning by 10 wickets with New Zealand winning by such margins a record three times. West Indies have won by 9 wickets on two occasions.

Rank	Margin	Opposition	Venue	Date
1	9 wickets	India	Sabina Park, Kingston, Jamaica	9 July 2017
1	9 wickets	Ireland	Warner Park, Basseterre, Saint Kitts and Nevis	19 January 2020
1	9 wickets	England	Kensington Oval, Bridgetown, Barbados	22 January 2022
4	8 wickets	England	Providence Stadium, Providence, Guyana	3 May 2010 ‡
4	8 wickets	Zimbabwe	Sir Vivian Richards Stadium, Antigua, Antigua and Barbuda	2 March 2013
4	8 wickets	Bangladesh	Sylhet International Cricket Stadium, Sylhet, Bangladesh	17 December 2018
4	8 wickets	India	Greenfield International Stadium, Thiruvananthapuram, India	8 December 2019
4	8 wickets	South Africa	National Cricket Stadium, St. George's, Grenada	26 June 2021
Last updated: 30 January 2022

==== Highest successful run chases ====
Australia holds the record for the highest successful run chase which they achieved when they scored 245/5 in response to New Zealand's 243/6. The highest successful chase for West Indies is 236/6 during the second match of the T20I Series against South Africa in 2015.

Rank	Score	Target	Opposition	Venue	Date
1	252/4	250	India	JSCA International Stadium Complex, Ranchi, India	9 October 2026
2	236/6	232	South Africa	New Wanderers Stadium, Johannesburg, South Africa	11 January 2015
3	196/3	193	India	Wankhede Stadium, Mumbai, India	31 March 2016 ‡
4	194/1	191	India	Sabina Park, Kingston, Jamaica	9 July 2017
5	183/4	183	England	Wankhede Stadium, Mumbai, India	16 March 2016 ‡
Last Updated: 9 October 2026

==== Narrowest win margins (by runs) ====
The narrowest run margin victory is by 1 run which has been achieved in 15 T20I's with West Indies winning by such margin once.

Rank	Margin	Opposition	Venue	Date
1	1 Run	India	Central Broward Regional Park, Lauderhill, USA	27 August 2016
2	3 Runs	Bangladesh	Sharjah Cricket Stadium, Sharjah, UAE	29 October 2021 ‡
3	4 Runs	India	Brian Lara Cricket Academy, San Fernando, Trinidad and Tobago	3 August 2023
4	7 Runs	Pakistan	Darren Sammy National Cricket Stadium, Gros Islet, Saint Lucia	21 April 2011
4	7 Runs	South Africa	Wanderers, Johannesburg, South Africa	28 March 2023
Last Updated: 6 November 2021

==== Narrowest win margins (by balls remaining) ====
The narrowest winning margin by balls remaining in T20Is is by winning of the last ball which has been achieved 26 times. The narrowest victory achieved by the West Indies is victory with one ball remaining on one occasion.

Rank	Balls remaining	Margin	Opposition	Venue	Date
1	0	2 wickets	Pakistan	Central Broward Stadium, Lauderhill, United States	3 August 2025
2	1	8 wickets	England	Providence Stadium, Providence, Guyana	3 May 2010 ‡
3	2	6 wickets	Australia	Sher-e-Bangla National Cricket Stadium, Mirpur, Bangladesh	28 March 2014 ‡
3	2	3 wickets	South Africa	Vidarbha Cricket Association Stadium, Nagpur, India	25 March 2016 ‡
3	2	7 wickets	India	Wankhede Stadium, Mumbai, India	31 March 2016 ‡
3	2	4 wickets	England	Eden Gardens, Kolkata, India	3 April 2016 ‡
Last Updated: 9 August 2020

==== Narrowest win margins (by wickets) ====
The narrowest margin of victory by wickets is 1 wicket which has settled four such T20Is. The narrowest victory by wickets for West Indies is three wickets.

Rank	Margin	Opposition	Venue	Date
1	3 wickets	South Africa	Vidarbha Cricket Association Stadium, Nagpur, India	25 March 2016 ‡
1	3 wickets	Sri Lanka	Coolidge Cricket Ground, Saint George Parish, Antigua	7 March 2021
1	3 wickets	South Africa	Centurion Park, Centurion, South Africa	25 March 2023
3	4 wickets	South Africa	Sahara Park Newlands, Cape Town, South Africa	9 January 2015 ‡
3	4 wickets	South Africa	New Wanderers Stadium, Johannesburg, South Africa	11 January 2015
3	4 wickets	England	Eden Gardens, Kolkata, India	3 April 2016 ‡
3	4 wickets	Sri Lanka	Coolidge Cricket Ground, Saint George Parish, Antigua	3 March 2021
Last Updated: 7 March 2021

==== Greatest loss margins (by runs) ====
West Indies's biggest defeat by runs was against Pakistan in the West Indies tour of Pakistan in April 2018 by 143 runs at National Stadium, Karachi, Pakistan.

Rank	Margin	Opposition	Venue	Date
1	143 runs	Pakistan	National Stadium, Karachi, Pakistan	1 April 2018
2	137 runs	England	Warner Park, Basseterre, Saint Kitts and Nevis	8 March 2019
3	119 runs	New Zealand	Bay Oval, Tauranga, New Zealand	3 January 2018
4	82 runs	Pakistan	National Stadium, Karachi, Pakistan	2 April 2018
5	81 runs	New Zealand	Eden Park, Auckland, New Zealand	11 January 2014
Last Updated: 9 August 2020

==== Greatest loss margins (by balls remaining) ====
The largest defeat suffered by West Indies was during the England's tour of West Indies in 2019 when they lost by 8 wickets with 57 balls remaining.

Rank	Balls remaining	Margin	Opposition	Venue	Date
1	70	6 wickets	England	Dubai International Cricket Stadium, Dubai, UAE	23 October 2021 ‡
2	57	8 wickets	England	Warner Park, Basseterre, Saint Kitts and Nevis	10 March 2019
3	50	8 wickets	Australia	Sydney Cricket Ground, Sydney, Australia	23 February 2010
4	34	9 wickets	Pakistan	Dubai International Cricket Stadium, Dubai, UAE	23 September 2016
5	29	8 wickets	Pakistan	Sheikh Zayed Cricket Stadium, Abu Dhabi, UAE	27 September 2016
Last Updated: 6 November 2021

==== Greatest loss margins (by wickets) ====
West Indies have lost an T20I match by a margin of 10 wickets on one occasion.

Rank	Margins	Opposition	Most recent venue	Date
1	10 wickets	England	The Oval, London, England	23 September 2011
2	9 wickets	Sri Lanka	Pallekele International Cricket Stadium, Kandy, Sri Lanka	29 September 2012 ‡
2	9 wickets	Pakistan	Dubai International Cricket Stadium, Dubai, UAE	23 September 2016
4	8 wickets	South Africa	New Wanderers Stadium, Johannesburg, South Africa	11 September 2007 ‡
4	8 wickets	Australia	Sydney Cricket Ground, Sydney, Australia	23 February 2010
4	8 wickets	Australia	Darren Sammy National Cricket Stadium, Gros Islet, Saint Lucia	27 March 2012
4	8 wickets	Pakistan	Sheikh Zayed Cricket Stadium, Abu Dhabi, UAE	27 September 2016
4	8 wickets	Pakistan	National Stadium, Karachi, Pakistan	3 April 2018
4	8 wickets	England	Warner Park, Basseterre, Saint Kitts and Nevis	10 March 2019
4	8 wickets	South Africa	Dubai International Cricket Stadium, Dubai, UAE	26 October 2021 ‡
4	8 wickets	Australia	Sheikh Zayed Cricket Stadium, Abu Dhabi, UAE	6 November 2021 ‡
Last Updated: 6 November 2021

==== Narrowest loss margins (by runs) ====
The narrowest loss of West Indies in terms of runs is by 1 run suffered once.

Rank	Margin	Opposition	Venue	Date
1	1 Run	South Africa	Sir Vivian Richards Stadium, Antigua, Antigua and Barbuda	20 May 2010 ‡
1	1 Run	South Africa	National Cricket Stadium, St. George's, Grenada	29 June 2021
1	1 Run	England	Kensington Oval, Bridgetown, Barbados	23 January 2022
4	3 runs	Pakistan	Queen's Park Oval, Port of Spain, Trinidad and Tobago	30 March 2017
5	4 runs	Ireland	National Cricket Stadium, St. George's, Grenada	15 January 2020
5	4 runs	Australia	Darren Sammy National Cricket Stadium, Gros Islet, Saint Lucia	14 July 2021
Last Updated: 30 January 2022

==== Narrowest loss margins (by balls remaining) ====
West Indies has suffered loss off the last ball two times.

Rank	Balls remaining	Margin	Opposition	Venue	Date
1	0	6 wickets	India	M. A. Chidambaram Stadium, Chennai, India	11 November 2018
1	0	2 wickets	Pakistan	Arnos Vale Stadium, Kingstown, Saint Vincent and the Grenadines	27 July 2013
3	1	3 wickets	Bangladesh	Sher-e-Bangla National Cricket Stadium, Mirpur, Bangladesh	11 October 2011
4	2	7 wickets	England	Trent Bridge, Nottingham, England	24 June 2012
4	2	7 wickets	India	Sher-e-Bangla National Cricket Stadium, Mirpur, Bangladesh	23 March 2014 ‡
Last Updated: 9 August 2020

==== Narrowest loss margins (by wickets) ====
West Indies has suffered defeat by 2 wickets once.

Rank	Margin	Opposition	Venue	Date
1	2 wickets	Pakistan	Arnos Vale Stadium, Kingstown, Saint Vincent and the Grenadines	27 July 2013
2	3 wickets	Bangladesh	Sher-e-Bangla National Cricket Stadium, Mirpur, Bangladesh	11 October 2011
3	4 wickets	England	Darren Sammy National Cricket Stadium, Gros Islet, Saint Lucia	5 March 2019
3	4 wickets	India	Central Broward Regional Park, Lauderhill, USA	3 August 2019
3	4 wickets	South Africa	New Wanderers Stadium, Johannesburg, South Africa	18 January 2008
3	4 wickets	New Zealand	Westpac Stadium, Wellington, New Zealand	15 January 2014
Last Updated: 9 August 2020

==== Tied matches ====
A tie can occur when the scores of both teams are equal at the conclusion of play, provided that the side batting last has completed their innings. There have been 19 ties in T20Is history with West Indies involved in three such games.

Opposition	Venue	Date
New Zealand	Eden Park, Auckland, New Zealand	16 February 2006
New Zealand	Eden Park, Auckland, New Zealand	26 December 2008
New Zealand	Pallekele International Cricket Stadium, Kandy, Sri Lanka	1 October 2012
Last updated: 3 December 2017

== Batting records ==
=== Most career runs ===
A run is the basic means of scoring in cricket. A run is scored when the batsman hits the ball with his bat and with his partner runs the length of 22 yards (20 m) of the pitch.

Rank	Runs	Player	Matches	Innings	Average	100	50	Period
1	2,400	Rovman Powell†	124	110	25.80	1	10	2017–2026
2	2,275	Nicholas Pooran	106	97	26.14	0	13	2016–2024
3	2,028	Brandon King†	87	85	25.35	0	14	2019–2026
4	2,004	Shai Hope†	74	72	33.40	3	13	2017–2026
5	1,899	Chris Gayle	79	75	27.92	2	14	2006–2021
6	1,799	Evin Lewis†	67	66	29.01	2	13	2016–2026
7	1,759	Shimron Hetmyer†	89	79	24.43	0	9	2018–2026
8	1,611	Marlon Samuels	67	65	29.29	0	10	2007–2018
9	1,569	Kieron Pollard	101	83	25.30	0	6	2008–2022
10	1,527	Lendl Simmons	68	67	26.78	0	9	2007–2021
Last Updated: 15 October 2026

=== Most runs in each batting position ===
Batting position	Batsman	Innings	Runs	Average	Span	Ref
Opener	Brandon King†	78	1,874	25.32	2019–2026	
Number 3	Nicholas Pooran	45	1,241	31.02	2018–2024	
Number 4	Rovman Powell†	26	705	29.37	2018–2026	
Number 5	Rovman Powell†	40	890	27.81	2018–2026	
Number 6	Rovman Powell†	36	694	23.13	2017–2026	
Number 7	Andre Russell†	24	421	23.38	2011–2025	
Number 8	Romario Shepherd†	16	311	28.27	2021–2026	
Number 9	Romario Shepherd†	7	163	40.75	2020–2026	
Number 10	Akeal Hosein†	16	127	21.16	2021–2026	
Number 11	Obed McCoy†	8	39	13.00	2019–2024	
Last Updated: 15 October 2026

=== Highest career strike rates ===
Rank	Strike rate	Player	Runs	Balls Faced	Period
1	163.79	Andre Russell	1,122	685	2011–2025
3	154.25	Sherfane Rutherford†	1,123	728	2018–2026
2	152.07	Evin Lewis†	1,799	1,183	2016–2026
4	148.74	Darren Sammy	534	359	2007–2016
5	147.28	Romario Shepherd†	950	64&	2020–2026
Qualification= 250 balls faced. Last Updated: 16 October 2026

=== Highest strike rates in an inning ===
Rank	Strike rate	Player	Runs	Balls Faced	Opposition	Venue	Date
1	414.29	Dwayne Smith	29	7	Bangladesh	New Wanderers Stadium, Johannesburg, South Africa	13 September 2007 ‡
2	345.45	Kieron Pollard	38	11	Sri Lanka	Coolidge Cricket Ground, Saint George Parish, Antigua	3 March 2021
3	340.00	Carlos Brathwaite	34*	10	England	Eden Gardens, Kolkata, India	3 April 2016 ‡
4	333.33	Darren Sammy	30*	9	England	Kensington Oval, Bridgetown, Barbados	11 March 2014
5	318.18	Dwayne Bravo	35*	11	New Zealand	Central Broward Regional Park, Lauderhill, USA	1 July 2012
Last Updated: 3 March 2021

=== Most sixes ===
Rank	Sixes	Player	Innings	Period
1	150	Rovman Powell†	103	2017–2026
2	149	Nicholas Pooran	97	2016–2024
3	136	Evin Lewis†	66	2016–2026
4	124	Chris Gayle	75	2006–2021
5	99	Shimron Hetmyer†	72	2018–2026
5	99	Kieron Pollard	83	2008–2022
Last Updated: 20 March 2026

=== Most fours ===
Rank	Fours	Player	Innings	Period
1	164	Brandon King†	58	2019–2024
2	158	Chris Gayle	75	2006–2021
3	149	Nicholas Pooran†	92	2016–2024
4	144	Marlon Samuels	65	2007–2019
5	140	Johnson Charles†	56	2011–2024
5	140	Lendl Simmons	67	2007–2021
Last Updated: 12 November 2024

=== Highest individual score ===
The third T20I of the 2018 Zimbabwe Tri-Nation Series saw Aaron Finch score the highest Individual score. Evin Lewis holds the highest such score for a West Indian batsmen.

Rank	Runs	Player	Opposition	Venue	Date
1	125*	Evin Lewis †	India	Sabina Park, Kingston, Jamaica	9 July 2017
2	118	Johnson Charles	South Africa	Centurion Park, Centurion, South Africa	25 March 2023
3	117	Chris Gayle	South Africa	New Wanderers Stadium, Johannesburg, South Africa	11 September 2007 ‡
4	107	Rovman Powell	England	Kensington Oval, Bridgetown, Barbados	26 January 2022
5	102*	Shai Hope	Australia	Warner Park, Basseterre, St Kitts and Nevis	25 July 2025
Last Updated: 30 January 2022

=== Highest individual score – progression of record ===
Runs	Player	Opponent	Venue	Season
26	Shivnarine Chanderpaul	New Zealand	Eden Park, Auckland, New Zealand	16 February 2006
26	Daren Ganga	New Zealand	Eden Park, Auckland, New Zealand	16 February 2006
61	Devon Smith	England	The Oval, London, England	28 June 2007
61	Chris Gayle	England	The Oval, London, England	29 June 2007
117	Chris Gayle	South Africa	New Wanderers Stadium, Johannesburg, South Africa	11 September 2007 ‡
125*	Evin Lewis†	India	Sabina Park, Kingston, Jamaica	9 July 2017
Last Updated: 9 August 2020

=== Highest career average ===
A batsman's batting average is the total number of runs they have scored divided by the number of times they have been dismissed.

Rank	Average	Player	Innings	Not Out	Runs	Period
1	29.29	Marlon Samuels	65	10	1,611	2007–2019
2	28.57	Evin Lewis†	57	3	1,543	2016–2024
3	28.25	Romario Shepherd†	30	14	452	2020–2024
4	28.11	Brandon King†	58	5	1,490	2019–2024
5	27.92	Chris Gayle	75	7	1,899	2006–2021
Qualification: 20 innings. Last Updated: 12 November 2024

=== Highest average in each batting position ===
Batting position	Batsman	Innings	Runs	Average	Career Span	Ref
Opener	Lendl Simmons	35	958	31.93	2007–2021	
Number 3	Marlon Samuels	40	1,097	31.34	2007–2018	
Number 4	Rovman Powell†	16	502	35.85	2018–2024	
Number 5	Nicholas Pooran	17	448	32.00	2018–2022	
Number 6	Kieron Pollard	24	544	34.00	2008–2022	
Number 7	Romario Shepherd†	16	199	24.87	2021–2025	
Number 8	Romario Shepherd†	10	169	24.14	2021–2024	
Number 9	Sunil Narine	12	73	10.42	2012–2017	
Number 10	Akeal Hosein†	10	69	34.50	2021–2025	
Number 11	Obed McCoy†	8	39	13.00	2019–2024	
Qualification: Minimum 10 innings. Last Updated: 11 June 2025

=== Most half-centuries ===
A half-century is a score of between 50 and 99 runs. Statistically, once a batsman's score reaches 100, it is no longer considered a half-century but a century.

Rank	Half centuries	Player	Innings	Runs	Period
1	14	Chris Gayle	75	1,899	2006–2021
2	13	Nicholas Pooran†	90	2,195	2016–2024
3	11	Evin Lewis†	53	1,515	2014–2024
3	11	Brandon King†	54	1,458	2019–2024
5	10	Marlon Samuels	65	1,611	2007–2018
Last Updated: 14 October 2024

=== Most centuries ===
A century is a score of 100 or more runs in a single innings.

Rank	Centuries	Player	Innings	Runs	Period
1	2	Evin Lewis	52	1,465	2016–2022
1	2	Chris Gayle	75	1,899	2006–2021
3	1	Johnson Charles†	39	971	2011–2023
3	1	Rovman Powell†	48	961	2017–2023
Last Updated: 27 March 2023

=== Most runs in a calendar year ===
Rank	Runs	Player	Matches	Innings	Year
1	582	Nicholas Pooran	23	22	2022
2	513	Rovman Powell	22	21	2022
3	489	Evin Lewis	18	18	2021
4	484	Nicholas Pooran	25	21	2021
5	480	Brandon King	18	17	2022
Last Updated: 21 October 2022

=== Most runs in a series ===
Rank	Runs	Player	Matches	Innings	Series
1	230	Marlon Samuels	7	6	2012 ICC World Twenty20
2	222	Chris Gayle	7	6	2012 ICC World Twenty20
3	193	Chris Gayle	5	5	2009 ICC World Twenty20
4	181	Marlon Samuels	6	6	2016 ICC World Twenty20
5	178	Evin Lewis	5	5	South Africa in West Indies in 2021
Last Updated: 3 July 2021

=== Most ducks ===
A duck refers to a batsman being dismissed without scoring a run.

Rank	Ducks	Player	Matches	Innings	Period
1	9	Andre Russell†	83	72	2011–2024
2	7	Jason Holder†	63	44	2014–2024
2	7	Andre Fletcher†	58	55	2008–2024
2	7	Johnson Charles†	57	56	2011–2024
5	6	Lendl Simmons	68	67	2007–2021
Last Updated: 12 November 2024

== Bowling records ==
=== Most career wickets ===
A bowler takes the wicket of a batsman when the form of dismissal is bowled, caught, leg before wicket, stumped or hit wicket. If the batsman is dismissed by run out, obstructing the field, handling the ball, hitting the ball twice or timed out the bowler does not receive credit.

Rank	Wickets	Player	Matches	Innings	Average	SR	Period
1	105	Jason Holder†	94	89	26.90	18.5	2014–2026
2	89	Akeal Hosein†	95	90	26.74	21.6	2021-2026
3	81	Romario Shepherd†	77	70	26.75	16.1	2020-2026
4	78	Dwayne Bravo	91	77	26.10	19.2	2006-2021
5	62	Alzarri Joseph†	45	44	24.59	15.9	2022-2025
6	61	Andre Russell	86	75	31.45	20	2011-2025
7	54	Samuel Badree	50	50	20.75	20.4	2012-2018
8	52	Sheldon Cottrell	45	44	23.92	17.6	2014-2023
8	52	Obed McCoy	43	42	23.11	15.8	2019-2025
8	52	Sunil Narine	51	49	21.25	21.1	2012-2019
9	45	Gudakesh Motie†	49	46	26.60	20.2	2021-2026
10	44	Daren Sammy	66	57	24.27	20	2007-2016
Last Updated: 23 February 2026

=== Best figures in an innings ===
Bowling figures refers to the number of the wickets a bowler has taken and the number of runs conceded. India's Deepak Chahar holds the world record for best figures in an innings when he took 6/7 against Bangladesh in November 2019 at Nagpur. Obed McCoy holds the West Indian record for best bowling figures.

Rank	Figures	Player	Opposition	Venue	Date
1	6/17	Obed McCoy	India	Warner Park, Basseterre, St. Kitts and Nevis	1 August 2022
2	5/11	Akeal Hosein	Uganda	Providence Stadium, Providence, Guyana	9 June 2024 ‡
3	5/15	Keemo Paul	Bangladesh	Sher-e-Bangla National Cricket Stadium, Mirpur, Bangladesh	22 December 2018
4	5/26	Darren Sammy	Zimbabwe	Queen's Park Oval, Port of Spain, Trinidad and Tobago	28 February 2010
5	5/27	Jason Holder	England	Kensington Oval, Bridgetown, Barbados	30 January 2022
Last Updated: 1 August 2022

=== Best figures in an innings – progression of record ===
Figures	Player	Opposition	Venue	Date
2/9	Dwayne Smith	New Zealand	Eden Park, Auckland, New Zealand	16 February 2006
3/24	Dwayne Smith	England	The Oval, London, England	28 June 2007
3/6	Jerome Taylor	South Africa	Axxess DSL St. Georges, Port Elizabeth, South Africa	16 December 2007
4/19	Lendl Simmons	Sri Lanka	Trent Bridge, Nottingham, England	10 June 2009 ‡
4/6	Sulieman Benn	Zimbabwe	Queen's Park Oval, Port of Spain, Trinidad and Tobago	28 February 2010
5/15	Keemo Paul	Bangladesh	Sher-e-Bangla National Cricket Stadium, Mirpur, Bangladesh	22 December 2018
6/17	Obed McCoy	India	Warner Park, Basseterre, St. Kitts and Nevis	1 August 2022
Last Updated: 2 August 2022

=== Best career average ===
A bowler's bowling average is the total number of runs they have conceded divided by the number of wickets they have taken. Afghanistan's Rashid Khan holds the record for the best career average in T20Is with 12.62. Ajantha Mendis, Sri Lankan cricketer, is second behind Rashid with an overall career average of 14.42 runs per wicket. Kesrick Williams has the best average among West Indies bowlers.

Rank	Average	Player	Wickets	Runs	Balls	Period
1	19.63	Kesrick Williams	41	805	561	2016–2020
2	20.75	Samuel Badree	54	1,121	1,104	2012–2018
3	21.25	Sunil Narine	52	1,105	1,102	2012–2019
4	22.95	Sheldon Cottrell †	46	1056	811	2014–2022
5	24.27	Darren Sammy	44	1,068	868	2007–2017
Qualification: 500 balls. Last Updated: 30 January 2022

=== Best career economy rate ===
A bowler's economy rate is the total number of runs they have conceded divided by the number of overs they have bowled. New Zealand's Daniel Vettori, holds the T20I record for the best career economy rate with 5.70. Sunil Narine, with a rate of 6.02 runs per over conceded over his 51-match T20I career, is the highest West Indian on the list.

Rank	Economy rate	Player	Wickets	Runs	Balls	Period
1	6.01	Sunil Narine	52	1,105	1,102	2012–2019
2	6.09	Samuel Badree	54	1,121	1,104	2012–2018
3	7.21	Sulieman Benn	18	606	504	2008–2016
4	7.28	Darren Sammy	44	1,068	880	2007–2016
5	7.35	Fabian Allen †	23	618	504	2018–2022
Qualification: 500 balls. Last Updated: 30 January 2022

=== Best career strike rate ===
A bowler's strike rate is the total number of balls they have bowled divided by the number of wickets they have taken. The top bowler with the best T20I career strike rate is Rashid Khan of Afghanistan with 12.3 balls per wicket strike rate. Williams is the West Indian bowler with the lowest strike rate.

Rank	Strike rate	Player	Wickets	Runs	Balls	Period
1	13.4	Kesrick Williams	41	805	561	2016–2020
2	17.6	Sheldon Cottrell †	46	1,056	811	2014–2022
3	18.1	Jerome Taylor	33	863	600	2006–2018
4	18.2	Jason Holder †	38	934	694	2014–2022
5	18.5	Ravi Rampaul †	31	803	575	2007–2021
Qualification: 500 balls. Last Updated: 30 January 2022

=== Most four-wickets (& over) hauls in an innings ===
Pakistan's Umar Gul has taken the most four-wickets (or over) among all the bowlers. Bravo and Darren Sammy have taken the most such hauls among West Indian bowlers.

Rank	Four-wicket hauls	Player	Matches	Balls	Wickets	Period
1	3	Obed McCoy†	18	360	29	2019–2022
1	3	Jason Holder†	39	788	42	2014–2022
1	3	Dwayne Bravo	91	1,5,05	78	2006–2021
4	2	Darren Sammy	66	880	44	2007–2016
5	1	Lendl Simmons	68	43	6	2007–2021
5	1	Devendra Bishoo	7	121	7	2011–2019
5	1	Krishmar Santokie	12	245	18	2011–2014
5	1	Oshane Thomas†	20	384	21	2018–2021
5	1	Keemo Paul†	22	450	25	2018–2022
5	1	Akeal Hosein†	25	468	19	2021–2022
5	1	Sulieman Benn	24	504	18	2008–2016
5	1	Kesrick Williams†	26	551	41	2016–2020
5	1	Sheldon Cottrell†	41	853	48	2014–2022
5	1	Kieron Pollard	101	856	42	2008–2022
5	1	Sunil Narine	51	1,102	52	2012–2019
5	1	Samuel Badree	50	1,104	54	2012–2018
Last Updated: 2 August 2022

=== Best economy rates in an inning ===
The best economy rate in an inning, when a minimum of 12 balls are delivered by the bowler, is Sri Lankan player Nuwan Kulasekara economy of 0.00 during his spell of 0 runs for 1 wicket in 2 overs against Netherlands at Zohur Ahmed Chowdhury Stadium in the 2014 ICC World Twenty20. Samuel Badree holds the record for West Indies bowler.

Rank	Economy	Player	Overs	Runs	Wickets	Opposition	Venue	Date
1	1.33	Samuel Badree	3	4	2	ICC	Lord's, London, England	31 May 2018
2	1.50	Sulieman Benn	4	6	4	Zimbabwe	Queen's Park Oval, Port of Spain, Trinidad and Tobago	28 February 2010
3	1.90	Jason Holder	3.4	7	4	England	Kensington Oval, Bridgetown, Barbados	22 January 2022
5	2.00	Jerome Taylor	3	6	3	South Africa	Axxess DSL St. Georges, Port Elizabeth, South Africa	16 December 2007
5	2.00	Daren Powell	3	6	1	South Africa	Axxess DSL St. Georges, Port Elizabeth, South Africa	16 December 2007
Qualification: 12 balls bowled. Last Updated: 30 January 2022

=== Best strike rates in an inning ===
The best strike rate in an inning, when a minimum of 4 wickets are taken by the player, is by Steve Tikolo of Kenya during his spell of 4/2 in 1.2 overs against Scotland during the 2013 ICC World Twenty20 Qualifier at ICC Academy, Dubai, UAE. Oshane Thomas recorded the best strike rate for a West Indian bowler.

Rank	Strike rate	Player	Wickets	Runs	Balls	Opposition	Venue	Date
1	3.4	Jason Holder	5	27	17	England	Kensington Oval, Bridgetown, Barbados	30 January 2022
2	3.6	Oshane Thomas †	5	28	18	Sri Lanka	Pallekele International Cricket Stadium, Kandy, Sri Lanka	4 March 2020
3	4.5	Lendl Simmons †	4	19	18	Sri Lanka	Trent Bridge, Nottingham, England	10 June 2009 ‡
4	4.6	Darren Sammy	5	26	23	Zimbabwe	Queen's Park Oval, Port of Spain, Trinidad and Tobago	28 February 2010
5	4.8	Keemo Paul †	5	15	24	Bangladesh	Sher-e-Bangla National Cricket Stadium, Mirpur, Bangladesh	22 December 2018
Last Updated: 30 January 2022

=== Worst figures in an innings ===
The worst figures in an T20I came in the Sri Lanka's tour of Australia when Kasun Rajitha of Sri Lanka had figures of 0/75 off his four overs at Adelaide Oval, Adelaide. Keemo Paul holds the corresponding record for West Indies.

Rank	Figures	Player	Overs	Opposition	Venue	Date
1	0/64	Keemo Paul	4	New Zealand	Bay Oval, Tauranga, New Zealand	29 November 2020
2	0/60	Kesrick Williams	3.4	India	Rajiv Gandhi International Cricket Stadium, Hyderabad, India	6 December 2019
3	0/56	Carlos Brathwaite	4	India	Bharat Ratna Shri Atal Bihari Vajpayee Ekana Cricket Stadium, Lucknow, India	6 November 2018
3	0/56	Oshane Thomas †	3	Bangladesh	Sher-e-Bangla National Cricket Stadium, Mirpur, Bangladesh	22 December 2018
5	0/54	Keemo Paul †	4	Bangladesh	Sher-e-Bangla National Cricket Stadium, Mirpur, Bangladesh	20 December 2018
5	0/54	Jason Holder †	4	India	Wankhede Stadium, Mumbai, India	11 December 2019
Last Updated: 29 November 2020

=== Most runs conceded in a match ===
Kasun Rajitha also holds the dubious distinction of most runs conceded in an T20I during the aforementioned match. Paul holds the corresponding West Indies record.

Rank	Figures	Player	Overs	Opposition	Venue	Date
1	0/64	Keemo Paul	4	New Zealand	Bay Oval, Tauranga, New Zealand	29 November 2020
2	0/60	Kesrick Williams	3.4	India	Rajiv Gandhi International Cricket Stadium, Hyderabad, India	6 December 2019
3	3/59	Romario Shepherd	4	England	Kensington Oval, Bridgetown, Barbados	26 January 2022
4	2/56	Nikita Miller	3.4	Australia	Sydney Cricket Ground, Sydney, Australia	23 February 2010
4	0/56	Carlos Brathwaite	4	India	Bharat Ratna Shri Atal Bihari Vajpayee Ekana Cricket Stadium, Lucknow, India	6 November 2018
4	0/56	Oshane Thomas †	3	Bangladesh	Sher-e-Bangla National Cricket Stadium, Mirpur, Bangladesh	22 December 2018
Last updated: 30 January 2022

=== Most wickets in a calendar year ===
Australia's Andrew Tye holds the record for most wickets taken in a year when he took 31 wickets in 2018 in 19 T20Is. Samuel Badree with 19 wickets in 2014 holds the West Indian record for most wickets in a year.

Rank	Wickets	Player	Matches	Innings	Year
1	22	Jason Holder†	14	14	2022
2	19	Samuel Badree	12	12	2014
2	19	Dwayne Bravo	20	16	2021
4	18	Kesrick Williams	10	10	2017
4	18	Obed McCoy	11	11	2021
Last Updated: 14 August 2022

=== Most wickets in a series ===
2019 ICC World Twenty20 Qualifier at UAE saw records set for the most wickets taken by a bowler in a T20I series when Oman's pacer Bilal Khan tool 18 wickets during the series. Jason Holder in the T20I series against England in January 2022 took 15 wickets, the most for a West Indian bowler in a series.

Rank	Wickets	Player	Matches	Series
1	15	Jason Holder	5	English cricket team in the West Indies in 2021-22
2	12	Hayden Walsh Jr.	5	Australia in West Indies in 2021
3	11	Samuel Badree	5	2014 ICC World Twenty20
4	10	Dwayne Bravo	6	2009 ICC World Twenty20
4	10	Dwayne Bravo	5	South Africa in West Indies in 2021
Last Updated: 30 January 2022

=== Hat-tricks ===
In T20Is history, this was first achieved by Jason Holder who went on to pick up a double hat-trick against England in 2022.

No.	Bowler	Against	Dismissals	Venue	Result	Date	Ref.
1	Jason Holder	West Indies	Chris Jordan (c); Sam Billings (c); Adil Rashid (c); Saqib Mahmood (b)	(Barbados) Kensington Oval, Bridgetown	Won	2022	

== Wicket-keeping records ==
The wicket-keeper is a specialist fielder who stands behind the stumps being guarded by the batsman on strike and is the only member of the fielding side allowed to wear gloves and leg pads.

=== Most career dismissals ===
A wicket-keeper can be credited with the dismissal of a batsman in two ways, caught or stumped. A fair catch is taken when the ball is caught fully within the field of play without it bouncing after the ball has touched the striker's bat or glove holding the bat, Laws 5.6.2.2 and 5.6.2.3 state that the hand or the glove holding the bat shall be regarded as the ball striking or touching the bat while a stumping occurs when the wicket-keeper puts down the wicket while the batsman is out of his ground and not attempting a run. Denesh Ramdin is the highest ranked West Indian wicket keeper in the all-time list of taking most dismissals in T20Is as a designated wicket-keeper just behind India's MS Dhoni.

Rank	Dismissals	Player	Matches	Innings	Period
1	63	Denesh Ramdin	71	71	2006–2019
2	30	Nicholas Pooran †	68	41	2016–2022
3	14	Devon Thomas†	12	11	2009–2022
4	12	Chadwick Walton	19	12	2017–2018
5	11	Andre Fletcher †	54	14	2010–2021
Last updated: 7 October 2022

=== Most career catches ===
Ramdin has taken the most catches in T20Is as a designated West Indies wicket-keeper just behind Dhoni on the all-time list.

Rank	Catches	Player	Matches	Innings	Period
1	43	Denesh Ramdin	71	71	2006–2019
1	23	Nicholas Pooran †	54	35	2016–2022
3	10	Chadwick Walton	19	12	2017–2018
3	10	Andre Fletcher †	54	14	2010–2021
5	8	Shai Hope †	18	11	2018–2022
Last Updated: 30 January 2022

=== Most career stumpings ===
Ramdin has made the most stumpings in T20Is as a designated wicket-keeper among West Indian wicket-keepers with Dhoni and Kamran Akmal of Pakistan heading this all-time list.

Rank	Stumpings	Player	Matches	Innings	Period
1	20	Denesh Ramdin	71	71	2006–2019
2	5	Nicholas Pooran †	54	35	2016–2022
3	2	Chadwick Walton	19	12	2017–2018
3	2	Johnson Charles	34	2	2013-2013
5	1	Andre Fletcher †	54	14	2010–2021
5	1	Devon Thomas	3	3	2009–2022
5	1	Shai Hope †	18	11	2018–2022
Last Updated: 30 January 2022

=== Most dismissals in an innings ===
Four wicket-keepers on four occasions have taken five dismissals in a single innings in an T20I.

The feat of taking 4 dismissals in an innings has been achieved by 19 wicket-keepers on 26 occasions with Denesh Ramdin doing it twice.

Rank	Dismissals	Player	Opposition	Venue	Date
1	4	Denesh Ramdin	Pakistan	Sher-e-Bangla National Cricket Stadium, Mirpur, Bangladesh	1 April 2014
1	4	Denesh Ramdin	Afghanistan	Bharat Ratna Shri Atal Bihari Vajpayee Ekana Cricket Stadium, Lucknow, India	14 November 2019
3	3	Denesh Ramdin	Australia	Bellerive Oval, Hobart, Australia	21 February 2010
3	3	Denesh Ramdin	Ireland	Providence Stadium, Providence, Guyana	30 April 2010
3	3	Andre Fletcher †	South Africa	Sir Vivian Richards Stadium, Antigua, Antigua and Barbuda	19 May 2010
3	3	Denesh Ramdin	England	Kensington Oval, Bridgetown, Barbados	9 March 2014
3	3	Chadwick Walton	Afghanistan	Warner Park, Basseterre, Saint Kitts and Nevis	2 June 2017
3	3	Nicholas Pooran †	Ireland	Warner Park, Basseterre, Saint Kitts and Nevis	19 January 2020
3	3	Nicholas Pooran †	Australia	Darren Sammy National Cricket Stadium, Gros Islet, Saint Lucia	14 July 2021
Last Updated: 14 July 2021

=== Most dismissals in a series ===
Netherlands wicket-keeper Scott Edwards holds the T20Is record for the most dismissals taken by a wicket-keeper in a series. He made 13 dismissals during the 2019 ICC World Twenty20 Qualifier. West Indian record is held by Denesh Ramdin when he made 6 dismissals during the 2009 ICC World Twenty20, 2012 ICC World Twenty20 and 2014 ICC World Twenty20.

Rank	Dismissals	Player	Matches	Innings	Series
1	6	Denesh Ramdin	6	6	2009 ICC World Twenty20
1	6	Denesh Ramdin	7	7	2012 ICC World Twenty20
1	6	Denesh Ramdin	5	5	2014 ICC World Twenty20
4	5	Denesh Ramdin	3	3	2010 ICC World Twenty20
4	5	Andre Fletcher	2	2	South Africa in West Indies in 2010
4	5	Denesh Ramdin	2	2	Afghanistan v West Indies in India in 2019-20
4	5	Nicholas Pooran	5	5	Australia in West Indies in 2021
Last Updated: 16 July 2021

== Fielding records ==
=== Most career catches ===
Caught is one of the nine methods a batsman can be dismissed in cricket. (Note: In 2017, The Laws of Cricket were amended, reducing the methods of dismissals from ten to nine, with handled the ball now covered as part of obstructing the field.) The majority of catches are caught in the slips, located behind the batsman, next to the wicket-keeper, on the off side of the field. Most slip fielders are top order batsmen.

South Africa's David Miller holds the record for the most catches in T20Is by a non-wicket-keeper with 57, followed by Shoaib Malik of Pakistan on 50 and New Zealand's Martin Guptill with 47. Bravo and Kieron Pollard are the leading catcher for West Indies.

Rank	Catches	Player	Matches	Innings	Ct/Inn	Period
1	44	Dwayne Bravo	91	88	0.500	2006–2021
2	42	Kieron Pollard	101	97	0.432	2008–2022
3	34	Lendl Simmons	68	67	0.507	2007–2021
4	30	Darren Sammy	66	66	0.454	2007–2016
5	22	Fabian Allen†	34	33	0.666	2018–2022
Last Updated: 2 August 2022

=== Most catches in an innings ===
The feat of taking 4 catches in an innings has been achieved by 14 fielders on 14 occasions with Sammy being the only West Indian fielder.

Rank	Dismissals	Player	Opposition	Venue	Date
1	4 ♠	Darren Sammy	Ireland	Providence Stadium, Providence, Guyana	30 April 2010
2	3	Sulieman Benn	Australia	The Oval, London, England	6 June 2009
2	3	Lendl Simmons †	India	Lord's, London, England	12 June 2009
2	3	Dwayne Bravo †	Zimbabwe	Sir Vivian Richards Stadium, Antigua, Antigua and Barbuda	3 March 2013
2	3	Dwayne Bravo †	Bangladesh	Sher-e-Bangla National Cricket Stadium, Mirpur, Bangladesh	25 March 2014
2	3	Lendl Simmons †	South Africa	National Cricket Stadium, St. George's, Grenada	1 July 2021
2	3	Dwayne Bravo †	Australia	Darren Sammy National Cricket Stadium, Gros Islet, Saint Lucia	9 July 2021
Last Updated: 9 July 2021

=== Most catches in a series ===
The 2019 ICC Men's T20 World Cup Qualifier, which saw Netherlands retain their title, saw the record set for the most catches taken by a non-wicket-keeper in an T20I series. Jersey's Ben Stevens and Namibia's JJ Smit took 10 catches in the series. Bravo with 7 catches in the 2014 ICC World Twenty20 is the leading West Indian fielder on this list.

Rank	Catches	Player	Matches	Innings	Series
1	7	Dwayne Bravo †	5	5	2014 ICC World Twenty20
1	7	Fabian Allen †	5	5	Australia in West Indies in 2021
3	6	Andre Fletcher	5	5	2009 ICC World Twenty20
3	6	Darren Sammy	5	5	2010 ICC World Twenty20
3	6	Lendl Simmons	3	3	South Africa in West Indies in 2021
Last Updated: 16 July 2021

== Other records ==
=== Most career matches ===
Pakistan's Shoaib Malik holds the record for the most T20I matches played with 116 matches, Pollard is the most experienced West Indian player having represented the team on 93 occasions.

Rank	Matches	Player	Runs	Wkts	Period
1	101	Kieron Pollard	1,569	42	2008–2022
2	98	Nicholas Pooran	2,195	-	2016–2024
3	91	Dwayne Bravo	1,255	78	2006–2021
4	82	Andre Russell	1,033	60	2011–2024
5	81	Rovman Powell †	1,469	5	2017–2024
Last Updated: 14 October 2024

=== Most consecutive career matches ===
Afghanistan's Mohammad Shahzad and Asghar Afghan hold the record for the most consecutive T20I matches played with 58. Sammy holds the West Indian record.

Rank	Matches	Player	Period
1	53	Nicholas Pooran	2019–2022
2	38	Rovman Powell †	2022–2024
3	36	Darren Sammy	2009–2013
4	31	Gudakesh Motie	2024–2025
5	28	Andre Russell	2014–2016
Last updated: 21 March 2026

=== Most matches as captain ===
MS Dhoni, who led the Indian cricket team from 2007 to 2016, holds the record for the most matches played as captain in T20Is with 72. Sammy has led West Indies in 47 matches, the most for any player from his country.

Rank	Matches	Player	Won	Lost	Tied	NR	Win %	Period
1	47	Darren Sammy	27	17	1	2	61.11	2011–2016
2	39	Kieron Pollard	13	21	0	5	38.23	2019–2022
3	31	Rovman Powell†	18	13	0	0	58.06	2022–2024
4	30	Carlos Brathwaite	11	17	0	2	39.28	2016–2019
5	23	Nicholas Pooran	8	14	0	1	36.36	2021–2022
Last Updated: 12 November 2024

=== Most matches won as a captain ===
Rank	Won	Player	Matches	Lost	Tied	NR	Win %	Period
1	27	Darren Sammy	47	17	1	2	61.11	2011–2016
2	14	Rovman Powell†	22	8	0	0	63.63	2022–2024
3	13	Kieron Pollard	39	21	0	5	38.23	2019–2022
4	11	Carlos Brathwaite	30	17	0	2	39.29	2016–2019
5	8	Nicholas Pooran	23	14	0	1	36.36	2021–2022
Last Updated: 20 June 2024

=== Most man of the match awards ===
Rank	M.O.M. Awards	Player	Matches	Period
1	10	Chris Gayle	79	2006–2021
2	7	Evin Lewis†	58	2016–2024
3	6	Marlon Samuels	67	2007–2018
4	5	Darren Sammy	66	2007–2016
4	5	Nicholas Pooran†	100	2016–2024
Last updated: 22 September 2024

=== Most man of the series awards ===
Rank	M.O.S. Awards	Player	Matches	Period
1	2	Nicholas Pooran†	100	2016–2024
Last updated: 22 September 2024

=== Youngest players on Debut ===
The youngest player to play in a T20I match is Marian Gherasim at the age of 14 years and 16 days. Making his debut for Romania against the Bulgaria on 16 October 2020 in the first T20I of the 2020 Balkan Cup thus becoming the youngest to play in a men's T20I match.

Rank	Age	Player	Opposition	Venue	Date
1	19 years and 263 days	Devon Thomas	Bangladesh	Warner Park, Basseterre, Saint Kitts and Nevis	2 August 2009
2	19 years and 320 days	Adrian Barath	Zimbabwe	Queen's Park Oval, Port of Spain, Trinidad and Tobago	28 February 2010
3	19 years and 356 days	Kemar Roach	Australia	Kensington Oval, Bridgetown, Barbados	20 June 2008
4	20 years and 39 days	Keemo Paul	Pakistan	National Stadium, Karachi, Pakistan	1 April 2018
5	20 years and 129 days	Sherfane Rutherford	Bangladesh	Shere Bangla National Stadium, Mirpur, Bangladesh	22 December 2018
Last Updated: 9 August 2020

=== Oldest Players on Debut ===
The Turkish batsmen Osman Göker is the oldest player to make their debut a T20I match. Playing in the 2019 Continental Cup against Romania at Moara Vlasiei Cricket Ground, Moara Vlăsiei he was aged 59 years and 181 days.

Rank	Age	Player	Opposition	Venue	Date
1	37 years and 10 days	Floyd Reifer	Bangladesh	Warner Park, Basseterre, Saint Kitts and Nevis	2 August 2009
2	36 years and 301 days	Rayad Emrit	New Zealand	Bay Oval, Tauranga, New Zealand	3 January 2018
3	33 years and 135 days	Rawl Lewis	South Africa	New Wanderers Stadium, Johannesburg, South Africa	18 January 2008
5	33 years and 17 days	Dale Richards	Bangladesh	Warner Park, Basseterre, Saint Kitts and Nevis	2 August 2009
4	33 years and 73 days	Shamarh Brooks	Pakistan	National Stadium, Karachi, Pakistan	13 December 2021
Last Updated: 13 December 2021

=== Oldest Players ===
The Turkish batsmen Osman Göker is the oldest player to appear in a T20I match during the same above mentioned match.

Rank	Age	Player	Opposition	Venue	Date
1	42 years and 46 days	Chris Gayle	Australia	Sheikh Zayed Cricket Stadium, Abu Dhabi, UAE	6 November 2021
2	39 years and 154 days	Fidel Edwards	Australia	Darren Sammy National Cricket Stadium, Gros Islet, Saint Lucia	10 July 2021
3	38 years and 30 days	Dwayne Bravo	Australia	Sheikh Zayed Cricket Stadium, Abu Dhabi, UAE	6 November 2021
4	37 years and 181 days	Marlon Samuels	Bangladesh	Central Broward Regional Park, Lauderhill, USA	5 August 2018
5	37 years and 149 days	Samuel Badree	Bangladesh	Central Broward Regional Park, Lauderhill, USA	5 August 2018
Last Updated: 6 November 2021

== Partnership records ==
In cricket, two batsmen are always present at the crease batting together in a partnership. This partnership will continue until one of them is dismissed, retires or the innings comes to a close.

=== Highest partnerships by wicket ===
A wicket partnership describes the number of runs scored before each wicket falls. The first wicket partnership is between the opening batsmen and continues until the first wicket falls. The second wicket partnership then commences between the not out batsman and the number three batsman. This partnership continues until the second wicket falls. The third wicket partnership then commences between the not out batsman and the new batsman. This continues down to the tenth wicket partnership. When the tenth wicket has fallen, there is no batsman left to partner so the innings is closed.

Wicket	Runs	First batsman	Second batsman	Opposition	Venue	Date
1st Wicket	145	Chris Gayle	Devon Smith	South Africa	New Wanderers Stadium, Johannesburg, South Africa	11 September 2007
2nd Wicket	152	Chris Gayle	Marlon Samuels	South Africa	New Wanderers Stadium, Johannesburg, South Africa	11 January 2015
3rd Wicket	122	Nicholas Pooran	Rovman Powell	England	Kensington Oval, Bridgetown, Barbados	26 January 2022
4th Wicket	103	Dwayne Bravo	Shimron Hetmyer	Australia	Darren Sammy National Cricket Stadium, Gros Islet, Saint Lucia	10 July 2021
5th Wicket	77	Dwayne Bravo	Ramnaresh Sarwan	Sri Lanka	Trent Bridge, Nottingham, England	10 June 2009
6th Wicket	139	Sherfane Rutherford	Andre Russell	Australia	Perth Stadium, Perth, Australia	13 February 2024
7th Wicket	73	Denesh Ramdin	Runako Morton	Australia	Bellerive Oval, Hobart, Australia	21 February 2010
8th Wicket	89	Romario Shepherd	Jason Holder	South Africa	Narendra Modi Stadium, Ahmedabad, India	26 February 2026
9th Wicket	72* ♠	Romario Shepherd	Akeal Hosein	England	Kensington Oval, Bridgetown, Barbados	23 January 2022
10th Wicket	37*	Sherfane Rutherford	Gudakesh Motie	New Zealand	Brian Lara Cricket Academy, San Fernando, Trinidad and Tobago	12 June 2024
Last Updated: 30 January 2022

=== Highest partnerships by runs ===
The highest T20I partnership by runs for any wicket is held by the Afghan pairing of Hazratullah Zazai and Usman Ghani who put together an opening wicket partnership of 236 runs during the Ireland v Afghanistan series in India in 2019

Wicket	Runs	First batsman	Second batsman	Opposition	Venue	Date
2nd Wicket	152	Chris Gayle	Marlon Samuels	South Africa	New Wanderers Stadium, Johannesburg, South Africa	11 January 2015
1st Wicket	145	Chris Gayle	Devon Smith	South Africa	New Wanderers Stadium, Johannesburg, South Africa	11 September 2007
6th Wicket	139	Sherfane Rutherford	Andre Russell	Australia	Perth Stadium, Perth, Australia	13 February 2024
2nd Wicket	135	Kyle Mayers	Johnson Charles	South Africa	Centurion Park, Centurion, South Africa	26 March 2023
1st Wicket	133	Chris Gayle	Andre Fletcher	Australia	The Oval, London, England	6 June 2009
1st Wicket	133	Evin Lewis	Lendl Simmons	Ireland	Warner Park, Basseterre, Saint Kitts and Nevis	19 January 2020
Last Updated: 9 August 2020

=== Highest overall partnership runs by a pair ===
Rank	Runs	Innings	Players	Highest	Average	100/50	Span
1	854	21	Nicholas Pooran & Rovman Powell †	122	40.66	2/4	2018–2024
2	744	25	Brandon King & Kyle Mayers †	79	29.76	0/5	2022–2024
3	687	18	Evin Lewis & Lendl Simmons	133	40.41	1/5	2019–2021
4	576	18	Chris Gayle & Marlon Samuels	152	32.00	1/2	2007–2016
5	570	17	Brandon King & Nicholas Pooran †	107	35.62	1/5	2020–2024
An asterisk (*) signifies an unbroken partnership (i.e. neither of the batsmen was dismissed before either the end of the allotted overs or the required score being reached). Last updated: 12 November 2024

== Umpiring records ==
=== Most matches umpired ===
An umpire in cricket is a person who officiates the match according to the Laws of Cricket. Two umpires adjudicate the match on the field, whilst a third umpire has access to video replays, and a fourth umpire looks after the match balls and other duties. The records below are only for on-field umpires.

Aleem Dar of Pakistan holds the record for the most T20I matches umpired with 53. The most experienced West Indian umpire is Gregory Brathwaite with 31 matches officiated so far.

Rank	Matches	Umpire	Period
1	39	Joel Wilson	2012–2022
2	38	Gregory Brathwaite	2012–2022
3	26	Nigel Duguid	2014–2022
4	24	Leslie Reifer	2016–2022
5	17	Billy Doctrove	2007–2010
Last Updated: 30 January 2022

== See also ==
- List of Twenty20 International records
- List of Test cricket records
- List of Cricket World Cup records
