= West Indian cricket team in South Africa in 2022–23 =

International cricket tour

	South Africa	West Indies
- Dates: 28 February – 28 March 2023
Captains	Temba Bavuma (Note: Aiden Markram captained South Africa in the third ODI.) (Tests & ODIs); Aiden Markram (T20Is)	Kraigg Brathwaite (Tests); Shai Hope (ODIs); Rovman Powell (T20Is)

Test series
- Result: South Africa won the 2-match series 2–0
Most runs	Aiden Markram (276)	Jermaine Blackwood (126)
Most wickets	Kagiso Rabada (12)	Alzarri Joseph (12)
- Player of the series: Aiden Markram (SA)

One Day International series
- Results: South Africa won the 3-match series 2–1
Most runs	Temba Bavuma (144)	Shai Hope (144)
Most wickets	Gerald Coetzee (5)	Alzarri Joseph (6)
- Player of the series: Heinrich Klassen (SA); Shai Hope (WI)

Twenty20 International series
- Results: West Indies won the 3-match series 2–1
Most runs	Reeza Hendricks (172)	Johnson Charles (146)
Most wickets	Marco Jansen (3); Anrich Nortje (3); Sisanda Magala (3)	Alzarri Joseph (5)
- Player of the series: Johnson Charles (WI)

The West Indies men's cricket team toured South Africa in February and March 2023 to play two Test matches, three One Day International (ODI) and three Twenty20 International (T20I) matches. The Test matches formed part of the 2021–2023 ICC World Test Championship. Cricket South Africa (CSA) confirmed the fixtures for the tour in October 2022.

South Africa won the Test series 2–0. The ODI series drew (1–1) between the two sides with the first game being abandoned due to rain. West Indies won the T20I series 2–1.

== Squads ==
Tests		ODIs		T20Is	
South Africa	West Indies	South Africa	West Indies	South Africa	West Indies
Temba Bavuma (c); Gerald Coetzee; Tony de Zorzi; Dean Elgar; Simon Harmer; Marco Jansen; Heinrich Klaasen (wk); Keshav Maharaj; Aiden Markram; Wiaan Mulder; Senuran Muthusamy; Anrich Nortje; Keegan Petersen; Kagiso Rabada; Ryan Rickelton	Kraigg Brathwaite (c); Jermaine Blackwood (vc); Alick Athanaze; Tagenarine Chanderpaul; Roston Chase; Joshua Da Silva (wk); Shannon Gabriel; Jason Holder; Akeem Jordan; Alzarri Joseph; Kyle Mayers; Gudakesh Motie; Raymon Reifer; Kemar Roach; Devon Thomas	Temba Bavuma (c); Gerald Coetzee; Quinton de Kock; Tony de Zorzi; Bjorn Fortuin; Reeza Hendricks; Marco Jansen; Heinrich Klaasen; Sisanda Magala; ~~Keshav Maharaj~~; Aiden Markram; David Miller; ~~Wiaan Mulder~~; Lungi Ngidi; Wayne Parnell; Andile Phehlukwayo; Ryan Rickelton; Tabraiz Shamsi; Tristan Stubbs; Rassie van der Dussen; Lizaad Williams	Shai Hope (c); Rovman Powell (vc); Shamarh Brooks; Yannic Cariah; Keacy Carty; Roston Chase; Shannon Gabriel; Jason Holder; Akeal Hosein; Alzarri Joseph; Brandon King; Kyle Mayers; Nicholas Pooran; Romario Shepherd; Odean Smith	Aiden Markram (c); Quinton de Kock; Bjorn Fortuin; Reeza Hendricks; Marco Jansen; Heinrich Klaasen; Sisanda Magala; David Miller; Lungi Ngidi; Anrich Nortje; Wayne Parnell; Kagiso Rabada; Rilee Rossouw; Tabraiz Shamsi; Tristan Stubbs	Rovman Powell (c); Kyle Mayers (vc); Shamarh Brooks; Yannic Cariah; Johnson Charles; Roston Chase; Sheldon Cottrell; Jason Holder; Akeal Hosein; Alzarri Joseph; Brandon King; ~~Obed McCoy~~; Nicholas Pooran; Raymon Reifer; Romario Shepherd; Odean Smith

On 6 March 2023, Anrich Nortje was ruled out of second test due to mild groin discomfort.

Initially, Aiden Markram, Marco Jansen, Heinrich Klaasen, David Miller and Wayne Parnell were selected only for the third match in South Africa's ODI squad. However on 13 March 2023, Parnell added to the squad for first two ODIs as an injury replacement for Wiaan Mulder, while Tabraiz Shamsi replaced injured Keshav Maharaj in South Africa's ODI squad. Temba Bavuma was ruled out of third ODI due to hamstring discomfort, with Aiden Markram captained South Africa in his absence.

On 14 March 2023, Obed McCoy was ruled out from the West Indies' T20I squad due to knee injury, and was replaced by Roston Chase.

== Tour match ==
21–23 February 2023
Scorecard

West Indies	v	South African Invitation XI
283/9d (89 overs); Jason Holder 57 (62); Corbin Bosch 2/17 (12 overs)		317 (89.5 overs); Wihan Lubbe 71 (131); Akeem Jordan 3/32 (19.5 overs)
208/8 (49 overs); Joshua Da Silva 44 (62); Thando Ntini 2/10 (9 overs)

Match drawn
Willowmoore Park, Benoni
Umpires: Lubabalo Gcuma (SA) and Stephen Harris (SA)

- South African Invitation XI won the toss and elected to field.

== Test series ==
=== 1st Test ===
28 February – 4 March 2023 (Note: While five days of play were scheduled for each Test, the first and second test reached a result in three days and four days respectively.)
Scorecard

South Africa	v	West Indies
342 (86.3 overs); Aiden Markram 115 (174); Alzarri Joseph 5/81 (18.3 overs)		212 (69 overs); Raymon Reifer 62 (143); Anrich Nortje 5/36 (16 overs)
116 (28 overs); Aiden Markram 47 (58); Kemar Roach 5/47 (10 overs)		159 (41 overs); Jermaine Blackwood 79 (93); Kagiso Rabada 6/50 (15 overs)

South Africa won by 87 runs
Centurion Park, Centurion
Umpires: Kumar Dharmasena (SL) and Marais Erasmus (SA)
Player of the match: Aiden Markram (SA)

- South Africa won the toss and elected to bat.
- 8 overs of play was lost on day 1 due to bad light.
- Gerald Coetzee and Tony de Zorzi (SA) both made their Test debuts.
- Alzarri Joseph (WI) took his first five-wicket haul in Tests.
- Joshua Da Silva (WI) equalled the Test record for the most dismissals in an innings by a wicket-keeper with 7.
- World Test Championship points: South Africa 12, West Indies 0.

=== 2nd Test ===
8–12 March 2023
Scorecard

South Africa	v	West Indies
320 (92.2 overs); Aiden Markram 96 (139); Kyle Mayers 3/32 (9 overs)		251 (79.3 overs); Jason Holder 81* (117); Gerald Coetzee 3/41 (14 overs)
321 (100.4 overs); Temba Bavuma 172 (280); Kyle Mayers 3/46 (17 overs)		106 (35.1 overs); Joshua Da Silva 34 (52); Gerald Coetzee 3/37 (8 overs)

South Africa won by 284 runs
Wanderers Stadium, Johannesburg
Umpires: Marais Erasmus (SA) and Paul Reiffel (Aus)
Player of the match: Temba Bavuma (SA)

- South Africa won the toss and elected to bat.
- Simon Harmer became the fourth player to dismiss a father-son duo in Test cricket when he dismissed Tagenarine Chanderpaul in the second innings.
- Heinrich Klaasen (SA) played in his last Test match.
- World Test Championship points: South Africa 12, West Indies 0.

== ODI series ==
=== 1st ODI ===
16 March 2023
13:00 (D/N)
Scorecard

West Indies; 231/9 (50 overs)	v	South Africa; 235/7 (48.3 overs)
Roston Chase 67 (92); Marco Jansen 5/46 (10 overs)		David Miller 82 (119); Alzarri Joseph 4/33 (10 overs)

South Africa won by 3 wickets
Buffalo Park, East London
Umpires: Marais Erasmus (SA) and Adrian Holdstock (SA)
Player of the match: Quinton De Kock (SA)

- South Africa won the toss and chose to bowl

=== 2nd ODI ===
18 March 2023
13:00 (D/N)
Scorecard

West Indies; 335/8 (50 overs)	v	South Africa; 287 (41.4 overs)
Shai Hope 128* (115); Gerald Coetzee 3/57 (10 overs)		Temba Bavuma 144 (118); Alzarri Joseph 3/53 (8.4 overs)

West Indies won by 48 runs
Buffalo Park, East London
Umpires: Marais Erasmus (SA) and Allahudien Paleker (SA)
Player of the match: Shai Hope (WI)

- West Indies won the toss and elected to bat.
- Gerald Coetzee, Tony de Zorzi, Ryan Rickelton and Tristan Stubbs (SA) all made their ODI debuts.
- This was West Indies' highest total against South Africa in ODIs.
- Temba Bavuma (SA) scored his 1,000th run in ODIs.

=== 3rd ODI ===
21 March 2023
10:00
Scorecard

West Indies; 260 (48.2 overs)	v	South Africa; 264/6 (29.3 overs)
Brandon King 72 (72); Marco Jansen 2/46 (9 overs)		Heinrich Klaasen 119* (61); Alzarri Joseph 3/50 (8 overs)

South Africa won by 4 wickets
Senwes Park, Potchefstroom
Umpires: Marais Erasmus (SA) and Bongani Jele (SA)
Player of the match: Heinrich Klaasen (SA)

- South Africa won the toss and elected to field.

== T20I series ==
=== 1st T20I ===
25 March 2023
14:00
Scorecard

South Africa; 131/8 (11 overs)	v	West Indies; 132/7 (10.3 overs)
David Miller 48 (22); Odean Smith 2/27 (2 overs)		Rovman Powell 43* (18); Sisanda Magala 3/21 (2 overs)

West Indies won by 3 wickets
Centurion Park, Centurion
Umpires: Bongani Jele (SA) and Allahudien Paleker (SA)
Player of the match: Rovman Powell (WI)

- West Indies won the toss and elected to field.
- The match was reduced to 11 overs per side due to rain.
- Aiden Markram captained South Africa for the first time in T20Is.

=== 2nd T20I ===
26 March 2023
14:00
Scorecard

West Indies; 258/5 (20 overs)	v	South Africa; 259/4 (18.5 overs)
Johnson Charles 118 (46); Marco Jansen 3/52 (4 overs)		Quinton de Kock 100 (44); Rovman Powell 1/27 (2 overs)

South Africa won by 6 wickets
Centurion Park, Centurion
Umpires: Adrian Holdstock (SA) and Allahudien Paleker (SA)
Player of the match: Quinton de Kock (SA)

- South Africa won the toss and elected to field.
- Johnson Charles (WI) and Quinton de Kock (SA) both scored their maiden centuries in T20Is.
- Johnson Charles scored the fastest century by a West Indies cricketer, in terms of number of balls faced, in a T20I (39).
- West Indies achieved their highest total in T20Is.
- West Indies equalled the record of most sixes (22) in a T20I innings.
- Quinton de Kock scored the fastest fifty by a South Africa cricketer, in terms of number of balls faced, in a T20I (15).
- South Africa became the first team to get past the 100-run mark inside the powerplay of a T20I.
- This was South Africa's highest total in T20Is.
- South Africa completed the highest successful run-chase in T20Is.
- The 517 runs scored in this match was the highest match aggregate in T20Is.
- 81 boundaries, including 35 sixes were hit in the match, and 324 runs were scored from the boundaries, all records in any T20I match.

=== 3rd T20I ===
28 March 2023
18:00 (N)
Scorecard

West Indies; 220/8 (20 overs)	v	South Africa; 213/6 (20 overs)
Romario Shepherd 44* (22); Anrich Nortje 2/36 (4 overs)		Reeza Hendricks 83 (44); Alzarri Joseph 5/40 (4 overs)

West Indies won by 7 runs
Wanderers Stadium, Johannesburg
Umpires: Shaun George (SA) and Adrian Holdstock (SA)
Player of the match: Alzarri Joseph (WI)

- South Africa won the toss and elected to field.
- Alzarri Joseph (WI) took his first five-wicket haul in T20Is.
