= West Indian cricket team in Pakistan in 2017–18 =

International cricket tour

	Pakistan	West Indies
- Dates: 1 – 3 April 2018
Captains	Sarfaraz Ahmed	Jason Mohammed

Twenty20 International series
- Results: Pakistan won the 3-match series 3–0
Most runs	Babar Azam (165)	Denesh Ramdin (63)
Most wickets	Mohammad Amir (5); Shadab Khan (5)	Rayad Emrit (3)
- Player of the series: Babar Azam (Pak)

The West Indies cricket team toured Pakistan in April 2018 to play three Twenty20 International (T20I) matches. Pakistan won the series 3–0. Following the conclusion of the series, Pakistan's captain Sarfaraz Ahmed said that "no team will be using security concerns as an excuse in the future. This year or the next year, (international) cricket will come back to Pakistan". The Pakistan Cricket Board (PCB) were hoping to play a full international series against a Full Member side in Pakistan by 2020.

It was the first tour in Pakistan of more than one match against another Test nation since Zimbabwe toured in May 2015. In October 2017, Sri Lanka played a T20I match against Pakistan in Lahore.

Originally, the fixtures were scheduled to be played in November 2017. However, early in November 2017, reports announced that the West Indies team would not be travelling to Pakistan over security concerns. The PCB chairman Najam Sethi stated that the original schedule was changed due to unforeseen weather, logistic issues and challenges with security. In March 2018, the PCB confirmed that the fixtures would take place in April at the National Stadium in Karachi. The last time an international cricket match was played at the venue in Karachi was in February 2009, when Sri Lanka toured Pakistan. That series was cut short, following an attack on the Sri Lanka cricket team in Lahore.

Cricket West Indies (CWI) offered an extra pay incentive to players to tour Pakistan. With only three days left before the tour started, the West Indies named a weakened squad to tour Pakistan. Jason Mohammed was named as captain of the West Indies, as the regular T20I captain, Carlos Brathwaite did not travel because of security concerns. Along with Brathwaite, Jason Holder, Chris Gayle and Devendra Bishoo did not make themselves available, also because of security concerns.

== Squads ==
Pakistan	West Indies
Sarfaraz Ahmed (c, wk); Shaheen Afridi; Asif Ali; Hasan Ali; Rahat Ali; Babar Azam; Mohammad Amir; Faheem Ashraf; Shadab Khan; Usman Khan; Shoaib Malik; Mohammad Nawaz; Ahmed Shehzad; Hussain Talat; Fakhar Zaman	Jason Mohammed (c); Samuel Badree; Rayad Emrit; Andre Fletcher; Andre McCarthy; Keemo Paul; Veerasammy Permaul; Rovman Powell; Denesh Ramdin (wk); Marlon Samuels; Odean Smith; Chadwick Walton; Kesrick Williams

Veerasammy Permaul injured himself during the first match and was ruled out of the West Indies squad for the remaining two fixtures. No replacement was named to replace him.

== T20I series ==
=== 1st T20I ===
1 April 2018
20:00 (N)
Scorecard

Pakistan; 203/5 (20 overs)	v	West Indies; 60 (13.4 overs)
Hussain Talat 41 (37); Keemo Paul 1/26 (4 overs)		Marlon Samuels 18 (19); Mohammad Amir 2/3 (2 overs)

Pakistan won by 143 runs
National Stadium, Karachi
Umpires: Ahsan Raza (Pak) and Shozab Raza (Pak)
Player of the match: Hussain Talat (Pak)

- West Indies won the toss and elected to field.
- Asif Ali, Hussain Talat (Pak), Keemo Paul and Veerasammy Permaul (WI) all made their T20I debuts.
- Jason Mohammed captained the West Indies for the first time in T20Is.
- This was the West Indies lowest total in T20Is.
- This was Pakistan's biggest win, in terms of runs, in T20Is.
- The West Indies loss was the largest margin of defeat between two Full Member sides in T20Is.

=== 2nd T20I ===
2 April 2018
19:30 (N)
Scorecard

Pakistan; 205/3 (20 overs)	v	West Indies; 123 (19.2 overs)
Babar Azam 97* (58); Odean Smith 1/40 (4 overs)		Chadwick Walton 40 (29); Mohammad Amir 3/22 (4 overs)

Pakistan won by 82 runs
National Stadium, Karachi
Umpires: Shozab Raza (Pak) and Ahmed Shahab (Pak)
Player of the match: Babar Azam (Pak)

- Pakistan won the toss and elected to bat.
- Odean Smith (WI) made his T20I debut.
- This was Pakistan's highest score in T20Is.

=== 3rd T20I ===
3 April 2018
19:30 (N)
Scorecard

West Indies; 153/6 (20 overs)	v	Pakistan; 154/2 (16.5 overs)
Andre Fletcher 52 (43); Shadab Khan 2/27 (4 overs)		Babar Azam 51 (40); Rayad Emrit 1/24 (4 overs)

Pakistan won by 8 wickets
National Stadium, Karachi
Umpires: Aleem Dar (Pak) and Ahsan Raza (Pak)
Player of the match: Fakhar Zaman (Pak)

- West Indies won the toss and elected to bat.
- Shaheen Afridi (Pak) and Andre McCarthy (WI) both made their T20I debuts.
