= West Indian cricket team against Afghanistan in India in 2019–20 =

International cricket tour

Afghan cricket team against West Indies in 2019–20
| | Afghanistan | West Indies |
- Dates: 4 November – 1 December 2019
| Captains | Rashid Khan | Jason Holder (Tests); Kieron Pollard (ODIs & T20Is) |

Test series
- Result: West Indies won the 1-match series 1–0
| Most runs | Javed Ahmadi (101) | Shamarh Brooks (111) |
| Most wickets | Amir Hamza (6) | Rahkeem Cornwall (10) |

One Day International series
- Results: West Indies won the 3-match series 3–0
| Most runs | Asghar Afghan (124) | Shai Hope (229) |
| Most wickets | Mujeeb Ur Rahman (5) | Roston Chase (6) |
- Player of the series: Roston Chase (WI)

Twenty20 International series
- Results: Afghanistan won the 3-match series 2–1
| Most runs | Rahmanullah Gurbaz (94) | Evin Lewis (106) |
| Most wickets | Karim Janat (6) | Kesrick Williams (8) |
- Player of the series: Karim Janat (Afg)

The Afghanistan cricket team played the West Indies cricket team in India in November and December 2019 to play one Test, three One Day Internationals (ODIs) and three Twenty20 International (T20I) matches. It was the first Test match that Afghanistan played against the West Indies. The two teams had played each other ten times before, with the majority of matches in the Caribbean, with this being Afghanistan's fourth Test match. All the matches were played at the Ekana International Cricket Stadium in Lucknow.

Following the 2019 Cricket World Cup, where Afghanistan lost all of their matches, Rashid Khan was named as the new captain of the Afghanistan cricket team across all three formats. In September 2019, Kieron Pollard was named as the captain of the West Indies' team for the ODIs and T20Is, taking over the roles from Jason Holder. Holder was retained as the Test captain of the team. Nitin Menon was one of the on-field umpires for the Test match, becoming the 62nd Indian to umpire at this level.

The West Indies won the first two ODIs to take an unassailable lead in the series, and secured their first ODI series win since beating Bangladesh 3–0 in August 2014. The West Indies won the final ODI by five wickets, winning the series 3–0, which was also their first whitewash since the Bangladesh series. Afghanistan won the T20I series 2–1. It was the second time that Afghanistan had won a T20I series against a team in the top ten of the ICC T20I Championship rankings, after whitewashing Bangladesh 3–0 in June 2018. The West Indies won the one-off Test match by nine wickets, with the game finishing early on the third day.

== Squads ==
| Test | | ODIs | | T20Is | |
| Afghanistan | West Indies | Afghanistan | West Indies | Afghanistan | West Indies |
|---|---|---|---|---|---|
| Rashid Khan (c); Asghar Afghan; Qais Ahmad; Javed Ahmadi; Yamin Ahmadzai; Ikram Alikhil (wk); Amir Hamza; Ihsanullah; Nasir Jamal; Karim Janat; Zahir Khan; Nijat Masood; Rahmat Shah; Ibrahim Zadran; Afsar Zazai | Jason Holder (c); Sunil Ambris; Kraigg Brathwaite; Shamarh Brooks; John Campbell; Roston Chase; Rahkeem Cornwall; Shane Dowrich (wk); Shimron Hetmyer; Shai Hope (wk); Alzarri Joseph; Keemo Paul; Kemar Roach; Jomel Warrican | Rashid Khan (c); Asghar Afghan; Javed Ahmadi; Yamin Ahmadzai; Ikram Alikhil; Sharafuddin Ashraf; Karim Janat; Mohammad Nabi; Gulbadin Naib; Rahmat Shah; Naveen-ul-Haq; Mujeeb Ur Rahman; Afsar Zazai; Hazratullah Zazai; Ibrahim Zadran; Najibullah Zadran | Kieron Pollard (c); Sunil Ambris; Roston Chase; Sheldon Cottrell; Shimron Hetmyer; Jason Holder; Shai Hope; Alzarri Joseph; Brandon King; Evin Lewis; Keemo Paul; Khary Pierre; Nicholas Pooran; Romario Shepherd; Hayden Walsh Jr. | Rashid Khan (c); Asghar Afghan; Fareed Ahmad; Javed Ahmadi; Yamin Ahmadzai; Sharafuddin Ashraf; Rahmanullah Gurbaz; Karim Janat; Mohammad Nabi; Gulbadin Naib; Sayed Shirzad; Naveen-ul-Haq; Mujeeb Ur Rahman; Ibrahim Zadran; Hazratullah Zazai; Najibullah Zadran | Kieron Pollard (c); Fabian Allen; Sheldon Cottrell; Shimron Hetmyer; Jason Holder; Shai Hope; Alzarri Joseph; Brandon King; Evin Lewis; Keemo Paul; Khary Pierre; ~~Nicholas Pooran~~; Denesh Ramdin; Sherfane Rutherford; Lendl Simmons; Hayden Walsh Jr.; Kesrick Williams |

West Indies cricketer Nicholas Pooran was found guilty of ball tampering during the third ODI match. Pooran admitted the charge, and was banned for four T20I matches. Shai Hope was added to the West Indies' T20I squad for the final match, as cover for Denesh Ramdin who was injured.

== Tour matches ==
=== 50 over match: Afghanistan XI vs West Indies ===
4 November 2019
14:00 (D/N)
Scorecard

| West Indies; 156 (38.5 overs) | v | Afghanistan XI; 160/6 (34.5 overs) |
| Roston Chase 41 (52); Naveen-ul-Haq 3/22 (7 overs) | | Rahmat Shah 47 (76); Romario Shepherd 3/16 (6 overs) |

Afghanistan XI won by 4 wickets
Ekana International Cricket Stadium, Lucknow
Umpires: Ahmed Shah Durrani (Afg) and Bismillah Jan Shinwari (Afg)

- West Indies won the toss and elected to bat.

=== Four-day match: Afghanistan XI vs West Indies ===
20–23 November 2019
Scorecard

| West Indies | v | Afghanistan XI |
| 168 (59.3 overs); Kraigg Brathwaite 46 (135); Amir Hamza 4/34 (23.3 overs) | | 158 (67.1 overs); Javed Ahmadi 56 (120); Jomel Warrican 5/38 (23.1 overs) |
| 297 (75.2 overs); Sunil Ambris 66 (69); Amir Hamza 4/91 (29 overs) | | 182/3 (54 overs); Ihsanullah 84* (149); Alzarri Joseph 2/37 (11 overs) |

Match drawn
Ekana International Cricket Stadium, Lucknow
Umpires: Ahmed Shah Pakteen (Afg) and Izatullah Safi (Afg)

- West Indies won the toss and elected to bat.

== ODI series ==
=== 1st ODI ===
6 November 2019
14:00 (D/N)
Scorecard

| Afghanistan; 194 (45.2 overs) | v | West Indies; 197/3 (46.3 overs) |
| Rahmat Shah 61 (80); Jason Holder 2/21 (10 overs) | | Roston Chase 94 (115); Mujeeb Ur Rahman 2/33 (10 overs) |

West Indies won by 7 wickets
Ekana International Cricket Stadium, Lucknow
Umpires: Paul Reiffel (Aus) and Bismillah Jan Shinwari (Afg)
Player of the match: Roston Chase (WI)

- West Indies won the toss and elected to field.
- Romario Shepherd (WI) made his ODI debut.
- Hayden Walsh Jr. also made his ODI debut for the West Indies after previously playing one ODI for the United States, becoming the 14th cricketer to represent two international teams in ODIs.
- This was the first ODI match to be played at this ground.

=== 2nd ODI ===
9 November 2019
14:00 (D/N)
Scorecard

| West Indies; 247/9 (50 overs) | v | Afghanistan; 200 (45.4 overs) |
| Nicholas Pooran 67 (50); Naveen-ul-Haq 3/60 (9 overs) | | Najibullah Zadran 56 (66); Sheldon Cottrell 3/29 (9 overs) |

West Indies won by 47 runs
Ekana International Cricket Stadium, Lucknow
Umpires: Ahmed Shah Pakteen (Afg) and Izatullah Safi (Afg)
Player of the match: Nicholas Pooran (WI)

- Afghanistan won the toss and elected to field.

=== 3rd ODI ===
11 November 2019
14:00 (D/N)
Scorecard

| Afghanistan; 249/7 (50 overs) | v | West Indies; 253/5 (48.4 overs) |
| Asghar Afghan 86 (85); Keemo Paul 3/44 (10 overs) | | Shai Hope 109* (145); Mujeeb Ur Rahman 2/49 (10 overs) |

West Indies won by 5 wickets
Ekana International Cricket Stadium, Lucknow
Umpires: Ahmed Shah Durrani (Afg) and Bismillah Jan Shinwari (Afg)
Player of the match: Shai Hope (WI)

- West Indies won the toss and elected to field.
- Ibrahim Zadran (Afg) and Brandon King (WI) both made their ODI debuts.

== T20I series ==
=== 1st T20I ===
14 November 2019
19:00 (N)
Scorecard

| West Indies; 164/5 (20 overs) | v | Afghanistan; 134/9 (20 overs) |
| Evin Lewis 68 (41); Gulbadin Naib 2/24 (4 overs) | | Najibullah Zadran 27 (22); Kesrick Williams 3/17 (4 overs) |

West Indies won by 30 runs
Ekana International Cricket Stadium, Lucknow
Umpires: Ahmed Shah Durrani (Afg) and Ahmed Shah Pakteen (Afg)
Player of the match: Kieron Pollard (WI)

- Afghanistan won the toss and elected to field.
- Ibrahim Zadran (Afg) and Brandon King (WI) both made their T20I debuts.
- Hayden Walsh Jr. also made his T20I debut for the West Indies after previously playing eight T20Is for the United States, becoming the ninth cricketer to represent two international teams in T20Is.
- Kieron Pollard captained the West Indies for the first time in T20Is.

=== 2nd T20I ===
16 November 2019
19:00 (N)
Scorecard

| Afghanistan; 147/7 (20 overs) | v | West Indies; 106/8 (20 overs) |
| Hazratullah Zazai 26 (15); Kesrick Williams 3/23 (4 overs) | | Denesh Ramdin 24* (27); Karim Janat 5/11 (4 overs) |

Afghanistan won by 41 runs
Ekana International Cricket Stadium, Lucknow
Umpires: Ahmed Shah Durrani (Afg) and Izatullah Safi (Afg)
Player of the match: Karim Janat (Afg)

- Afghanistan won the toss and elected to bat.
- Karim Janat (Afg) took his first five-wicket haul in T20Is.

=== 3rd T20I ===
17 November 2019
19:00 (N)
Scorecard

| Afghanistan; 156/8 (20 overs) | v | West Indies; 127/7 (20 overs) |
| Rahmanullah Gurbaz 79 (52); Keemo Paul 2/26 (3 overs) | | Shai Hope 52 (46); Naveen-ul-Haq 3/24 (4 overs) |

Afghanistan won by 29 runs
Ekana International Cricket Stadium, Lucknow
Umpires: Ahmed Shah Pakteen (Afg) and Izatullah Safi (Afg)
Player of the match: Rahmanullah Gurbaz (Afg)

- Afghanistan won the toss and elected to bat.

== Only Test ==
27 November–1 December 2019 (Note: While five days of play were scheduled for the one-off Test, it result in three days.)
Scorecard

| Afghanistan | v | West Indies |
| 187 (68.3 overs); Javed Ahmadi 39 (81); Rahkeem Cornwall 7/75 (25.3 overs) | | 277 (83.3 overs); Shamarh Brooks 111 (214); Amir Hamza 5/74 (28.3 overs) |
| 120 (43.1 overs); Javed Ahmadi 62 (93); Roston Chase 3/10 (3 overs) | | 33/1 (6.2 overs); John Campbell 19* (16); Amir Hamza 1/5 (2.2 overs) |

West Indies won by 9 wickets
Ekana International Cricket Stadium, Lucknow
Umpires: Nitin Menon (Ind) and Paul Reiffel (Aus)
Player of the match: Rahkeem Cornwall (WI)

- West Indies won the toss and elected to field.
- Amir Hamza and Nasir Jamal (Afg) both made their Test debuts.
- This was the first Test match to be played at this ground.
- Rahkeem Cornwall (WI) took his first five-wicket haul in Tests.
- Shamarh Brooks (WI) scored his first century in Tests.
- Amir Hamza became the first bowler for Afghanistan to take a five-wicket haul on debut in Tests.
