= 2020 Caribbean Premier League =

Eighth season of the Caribbean Premier League

- Dates: 18 August – 10 September 2020
- Administrator: CPL Limited
- Cricket format: Twenty20
- Tournament format(s): Group stage and knockout
- Host: Trinidad and Tobago
- Champions: Trinbago Knight Riders (4th title)
- Runners-up: St Lucia Zouks
- Participants: 6
- Matches: 33
- Player of the series: Kieron Pollard (Trinbago Knight Riders)
- Most runs: Lendl Simmons (Trinbago Knight Riders) (356)
- Most wickets: Scott Kuggeleijn (St Lucia Zouks) (17)
- Official website: cplt20.com

The 2020 Caribbean Premier League (CPLT20) or for sponsorship reasons, Hero CPL 2020 was the eighth season of the Caribbean Premier League, the domestic Twenty20 cricket league played in the West Indies. All matches were played in Trinidad and Tobago. The tournament started on 18 August and ended on 10 September 2020. On 10 July 2020, the local government gave its approval for the tournament to go ahead, with all the matches taking place at two venues behind closed doors. The full schedule for the tournament was confirmed on 27 July 2020. On 6 August 2020, an official press release stated that all players, officials and administrators involved in the league had tested negative on arrival ahead of a two weeks quarantine period.

Unlike the previous edition of the tournament, the playoffs had two semi-finals and a final, and not the eliminator matches, which gave teams two chances to reach the final. The Trinbago Knight Riders were the first team to qualify for the playoffs, and were joined by the St Lucia Zouks. The Guyana Amazon Warriors became the third team to reach the playoffs, after beating the St Lucia Zouks by seven wickets. On 3 September 2020, the Guyana Amazon Warriors beat the Barbados Tridents by six wickets. The result meant that the Barbados Tridents were eliminated from the tournament, with the Jamaica Tallawahs taking the fourth and final place in the playoffs. The Trinbago Knight Riders finished top of the group stage, winning all ten of their matches.

In the first semi-final, the Trinbago Knight Riders beat the Jamaica Tallawahs by nine wickets to advance to the final of the tournament. The St Lucia Zouks won their semi-final by 10 wickets, after the Guyana Amazon Warriors were bowled out for 55 runs, the second-lowest team total in the CPL. In the final, the Trinbago Knight Riders beat the St Lucia Zouks by eight wickets to win their fourth CPL title.

== COVID-19 safety measures ==
As per the agreement between the CPL and the Trinidad and Tobago government, all overseas players, team personnel, and other tournament personnel were required to self-isolate for two weeks before entering the country and two weeks after. All overseas players and personnel will be tested for COVID-19 before departure, 7 days after arrival, and 14 days after arrival. All overseas players and personnel have to enter Trinidad and Tobago no later than two weeks before the start of the tournament. Due to Trinidad and Tobago's lockdown rules, individuals may only enter the country on charter flights. The CPL organized a number of charter flights from various locations around the world to bring players to Trinidad and Tobago. Following their arrival, all overseas players and personnel will be staying in a bubble at the Hilton Hotel in Port-of-Spain and will only leave for CPL matches. Trinidad-based players and staff will be entering the bubble the week of 10 August following mandatory testing.

The St. Lucia Zouks and the Trinbago Knight Riders were the first teams allowed to start training, being able to do so from 11 August. On 12 August 2020, Ramnaresh Sarwan, the Jamaica Tallawahs assistant coach, left the bio-secure bubble for personal reasons.

== Squads ==
The following emerging and retained players were selected for the tournament, with the full squads named on 6 July 2020. At the age of 48, Pravin Tambe became the first Indian cricketer to get a contract in the Caribbean Premier League. Wahab Riaz (Tridents), Shoaib Malik (Amazon Warriors), and Shadab Khan (Amazon Warriors) were named in Pakistan's squad for their tour of England and therefore missed the CPL. Chris Gayle opted out of the CPL for personal reasons.

The COVID-19 pandemic and related travel restrictions resulted in some last minute squad changes. Imran Tahir of the Amazon Warriors was the only South African player to take part in the tournament, after the other five South African cricketers (Rassie van der Dussen (Patriots), Tabraiz Shamsi (Tallawahs), Anrich Nortje (Zouks), Rilee Rossouw (Zouks), Colin Ingram (Zouks)) failed to confirm travel arrangements in due time. Van der Dussen was replaced by Nick Kelly. Alex Hales and Harry Gurney, both of whom were in the Tridents' squad, withdrew from the tournament. Fabian Allen, who was playing for the Patriots, was ruled out of the tournament after missing his flight. The Patriots will not be naming a replacement for Allen. Dennis Bulli, who was in the Patriots' squad, withdrew from the tournament following a positive COVID-19 test and was replaced by Imran Khan. Afghans Qais Ahmad (Amazon Warriors), Rahmanullah Gurbaz (Tridents) and Noor Ahmad (Zouks) withdrew due to visa issues. Marcus Stoinis (Tridents) and Sunny Sohal (Patriots) withdrew due to COVID-19 concerns. The Tallawahs withdrew Andre McCarthy and Jeavor Royal because they came in contact with a player who tested positive for COVID-19. Corey Anderson (Tridents), Mitchell Santner (Tridents), Shamarh Brooks (Tridents), Keon Harding (Tridents), Kissoondath Magram (Amazon Warriors), Mujeeb Ur Rahman (Tallawahs), Jermaine Blackwood (Tallawahs), Ramaal Lewis (Tallawahs), Jahmar Hamilton (Patriots), Roston Chase (Zouks), Zahir Khan (Zouks), Scott Kuggeleijn (Zouks), and Najibullah Zadran (Zouks) were brought in as replacement players. Cricket West Indies confirmed the revised squads for the tournament on 18 August 2020.

Barbados Tridents	Guyana Amazon Warriors	Jamaica Tallawahs	St Kitts & Nevis Patriots	St Lucia Zouks	Trinbago Knight Riders
Jason Holder (c); Nyeem Young; Johnson Charles; Shai Hope; Hayden Walsh Jr.; Ashley Nurse; Jonathan Carter; Raymon Reifer; Justin Greaves; ~~Wahab Riaz~~; Rashid Khan; ~~Rahmanullah Gurbaz~~; ~~Marcus Stoinis~~; ~~Harry Gurney~~; ~~Alex Hales~~; Kyle Mayers; Joshua Bishop; Shayan Jahangir; Corey Anderson; Mitchell Santner; Shamarh Brooks; Keon Harding	Chris Green (c); Kevin Sinclair; Nicholas Pooran; Shimron Hetmyer; Brandon King; Keemo Paul; Sherfane Rutherford; Romario Shepherd; Chandrapaul Hemraj; Odean Smith; Anthony Bramble; ~~Shoaib Malik~~; ~~Shadab Khan~~; ~~Qais Ahmad~~; Naveen-ul-Haq; Imran Tahir; Ross Taylor; Ashmead Nedd; Jasdeep Singh; Kissoondath Magram	Rovman Powell (c); Andre Russell; Oshane Thomas; Chadwick Walton; ~~Tabraiz Shamsi~~; Glenn Phillips; Sandeep Lamichhane; Carlos Brathwaite; Asif Ali; Fidel Edwards; Preston McSween; ~~Andre McCarthy~~; Nicholas Kirton; ~~Jeavor Royal~~; Nkrumah Bonner; Veerasammy Permaul; Ryan Persaud; Jermaine Blackwood; Mujeeb Ur Rahman; Ramaal Lewis	Rayad Emrit (c); Dominic Drakes; Evin Lewis; ~~Fabian Allen~~; Sheldon Cottrell; Denesh Ramdin; Alzarri Joseph; Chris Lynn; ~~Rassie van der Dussen~~; Ben Dunk; Sohail Tanvir; Ish Sodhi; ~~Dennis Bulli~~; Joshua Da Silva; Colin Archibald; Jon-Russ Jaggesar; ~~Sunny Sohal~~; Nick Kelly; Imran Khan; Jahmar Hamilton; Kieran Powell	Daren Sammy (c); Kimani Melius; ~~Chris Gayle~~; Andre Fletcher; Kesrick Williams; Obed McCoy; Rahkeem Cornwall; Kavem Hodge; ~~Rilee Rossouw~~; ~~Anrich Nortje~~; Mohammad Nabi; ~~Colin Ingram~~; Chemar Holder; Mark Deyal; ~~Noor Ahmad~~; Leniko Boucher; Javelle Glen; Saad Bin Zafar; Najibullah Zadran; Scott Kuggeleijn; ~~Jonathan Wells~~; Roston Chase; Zahir Khan	Kieron Pollard (c); Dwayne Bravo; Sunil Narine; Colin Munro; Fawad Ahmed; Darren Bravo; Lendl Simmons; Khary Pierre; Tim Seifert; Sikandar Raza; Anderson Phillip; Pravin Tambe; Jayden Seales; Amir Jangoo; Tion Webster; Akeal Hosein; Ali Khan

== Venues ==
The Brian Lara Cricket Academy hosted the first ten and the last ten league matches, along with all the matches in the playoffs. The remaining fixtures took place at Queen's Park Oval.

Tarouba	2020 Caribbean Premier League is located in Trinidad and Tobago	Port of Spain
Brian Lara Cricket Academy	2020 Caribbean Premier League is located in Trinidad and Tobago	Queen's Park Oval
Capacity: 15,000	2020 Caribbean Premier League is located in Trinidad and Tobago	Capacity: 20,000

== Points table ==
Pos	Team	Pld	W	L	NR	Pts	NRR
1	Trinbago Knight Riders	10	10	0	0	20	1.294
2	Guyana Amazon Warriors	10	6	4	0	12	0.600
3	St Lucia Zouks	10	6	4	0	12	−0.021
4	Jamaica Tallawahs	10	3	6	1	7	−0.245
5	Barbados Tridents	10	3	7	0	6	−0.253
6	St Kitts & Nevis Patriots	10	1	8	1	3	−1.498

- advanced to the Playoffs

== League stage ==
18 August 2020
10:00
Scorecard

Guyana Amazon Warriors; 144/5 (17 overs)	v	Trinbago Knight Riders; 147/6 (16.4 overs)
Shimron Hetmyer 63* (44); Sunil Narine 2/19 (4 overs)		Sunil Narine 50 (28); Naveen-ul-Haq 2/21 (3.4 overs)

Trinbago Knight Riders won by 4 wickets
Brian Lara Cricket Academy, Tarouba
Umpires: Deighton Butler (WI) and Leslie Reifer (WI)
Player of the match: Sunil Narine (Trinbago Knight Riders)

- Trinbago Knight Riders won the toss and elected to field.
- The match was reduced to 17 overs per side due to rain.
- Jayden Seales (Trinbago Knight Riders) made his T20 debut.

18 August 2020
17:30 (D/N)
Scorecard

Barbados Tridents; 153/9 (20 overs)	v	St Kitts & Nevis Patriots; 147/5 (20 overs)
Jason Holder 38 (22); Sheldon Cottrell 2/16 (4 overs); Rayad Emrit 2/16 (4 overs)		Joshua Da Silva 41* (41); Mitchell Santner 2/18 (4 overs)

Barbados Tridents won by 6 runs
Brian Lara Cricket Academy, Tarouba
Umpires: Gregory Brathwaite (WI) and Nigel Duguid (WI)
Player of the match: Mitchell Santner (Barbados Tridents)

- St Kitts & Nevis Patriots won the toss and elected to field.
- Joshua Da Silva (St Kitts & Nevis Patriots) made his T20 debut.

19 August 2020
10:00
Scorecard

St Lucia Zouks; 158/7 (20 overs)	v	Jamaica Tallawahs; 160/5 (18.5 overs)
Roston Chase 52 (42); Mujeeb Ur Rahman 2/25 (4 overs)		Asif Ali 47* (27); Kesrick Williams 2/32 (4 overs)

Jamaica Tallawahs won by 5 wickets
Brian Lara Cricket Academy, Tarouba
Umpires: Leslie Reifer (WI) and Joel Wilson (WI)
Player of the match: Asif Ali (Jamaica Tallawahs)

- Jamaica Tallawahs won the toss and elected to field.

19 August 2020
17:30 (D/N)
Scorecard

St Kitts & Nevis Patriots; 127/8 (20 overs)	v	Guyana Amazon Warriors; 131/7 (17 overs)
Evin Lewis 30 (18); Keemo Paul 4/19 (4 overs)		Shimron Hetmyer 71 (44); Rayad Emrit 3/31 (4 overs)

Guyana Amazon Warriors won by 3 wickets
Brian Lara Cricket Academy, Tarouba
Umpires: Zahid Bassarath (WI) and Nigel Duguid (WI)
Player of the match: Keemo Paul (Guyana Amazon Warriors)

- Guyana Amazon Warriors won the toss and elected to field.

20 August 2020
10:00
Scorecard

Barbados Tridents; 131/7 (18.1 overs)	v	St Lucia Zouks; 50/3 (4.1 overs)
Johnson Charles 35 (19); Roston Chase 2/8 (2 overs)		Andre Fletcher 16* (7); Rashid Khan 2/24 (2 overs)

St Lucia Zouks won by 7 wickets (DLS method)
Brian Lara Cricket Academy, Tarouba
Umpires: Deighton Butler (WI) and Joel Wilson (WI)
Player of the match: Mohammad Nabi (St Lucia Zouks)

- Barbados Tridents won the toss and elected to bat.
- Rain stopped play during Barbados Tridents' innings. St Lucia Zouks were set a revised target of 47 runs from 5 overs.
- Rashid Khan (Barbados Tridents), at the age of 21 years and 335 days, became the youngest bowler to take 300 wickets in T20 cricket.
- Rashid Khan also became the fastest to take 300 wickets in T20 cricket, doing so in 213 matches.

20 August 2020
17:30 (D/N)
Scorecard

Jamaica Tallawahs; 135/8 (20 overs)	v	Trinbago Knight Riders; 136/3 (18.1 overs)
Glenn Phillips 58 (42); Jayden Seales 2/21 (3 overs)		Sunil Narine 53 (38); Mujeeb Ur Rahman 1/13 (4 overs)

Trinbago Knight Riders won by 7 wickets
Brian Lara Cricket Academy, Tarouba
Umpires: Zahid Bassarath (WI) and Gregory Brathwaite (WI)
Player of the match: Sunil Narine (Trinbago Knight Riders)

- Trinbago Knight Riders won the toss and elected to field.

22 August 2020
10:00
Scorecard

St Lucia Zouks; 172/6 (20 overs)	v	St Kitts & Nevis Patriots; 162/8 (20 overs)
Andre Fletcher 46 (33); Jon-Russ Jaggesar 2/29 (4 overs)		Denesh Ramdin 46 (35); Scott Kuggeleijn 4/33 (4 overs)

St Lucia Zouks won by 10 runs
Brian Lara Cricket Academy, Tarouba
Umpires: Deighton Butler (WI) and Leslie Reifer (WI)
Player of the match: Mohammad Nabi (St Lucia Zouks)

- St Kitts & Nevis Patriots won the toss and elected to field.

22 August 2020
14:15
Scorecard

Guyana Amazon Warriors; 118 (19.1 overs)	v	Jamaica Tallawahs; 104/7 (20 overs)
Brandon King 29 (19); Carlos Brathwaite 3/14 (3.1 overs)		Andre Russell 52* (37); Chris Green 2/10 (3 overs)

Guyana Amazon Warriors won by 14 runs
Brian Lara Cricket Academy, Tarouba
Umpires: Gregory Brathwaite (WI) and Nigel Duguid (WI)
Player of the match: Naveen-ul-Haq (Guyana Amazon Warriors)

- Jamaica Tallawahs won the toss and elected to field.
- Ashmead Nedd (Guyana Amazon Warriors) made his T20 debut.
- Guyana Amazon Warriors defended the lowest total in a match in the CPL.

23 August 2020
10:00
Scorecard

Trinbago Knight Riders; 185/3 (20 overs)	v	Barbados Tridents; 166/6 (20 overs)
Darren Bravo 54* (36); Ashley Nurse 1/20 (4 overs)		Johnson Charles 52 (33); Fawad Ahmed 1/14 (3 overs)

Trinbago Knight Riders won by 19 runs
Brian Lara Cricket Academy, Tarouba
Umpires: Leslie Reifer (WI) and Joel Wilson (WI)
Player of the match: Colin Munro (Trinbago Knight Riders)

- Barbados Tridents won the toss and elected to field.

23 August 2020
14:15
Scorecard

St Lucia Zouks; 144/7 (20 overs)	v	Guyana Amazon Warriors; 134/8 (20 overs)
Roston Chase 66 (51); Imran Tahir 3/22 (4 overs)		Nicholas Pooran 68 (49); Scott Kuggeleijn 3/24 (4 overs)

St Lucia Zouks won by 10 runs
Brian Lara Cricket Academy, Tarouba
Umpires: Zahid Bassarath (WI) and Nigel Duguid (WI)
Player of the match: Roston Chase (St Lucia Zouks)

- St Lucia Zouks won the toss and elected to bat.
- Kimani Melius (St Lucia Zouks) made his T20 debut.

25 August 2020
10:00
Scorecard

Barbados Tridents; 151/7 (20 overs)	v	St Kitts & Nevis Patriots; 152/4 (19.3 overs)
Corey Anderson 31 (19); Jon-Russ Jaggesar 2/17 (4 overs)		Evin Lewis 89 (60); Kyle Mayers 2/14 (2 overs)

St Kitts & Nevis Patriots won by 6 wickets
Queen's Park Oval, Port of Spain
Umpires: Zahid Bassarath (WI) and Gregory Brathwaite (WI)
Player of the match: Evin Lewis (St Kitts & Nevis Patriots)

- St Kitts & Nevis Patriots won the toss and elected to field.
- Nyeem Young (Barbados Tridents) made his T20 debut.

25 August 2020
17:30 (D/N)
Scorecard

Guyana Amazon Warriors; 108/9 (20 overs)	v	Jamaica Tallawahs; 113/5 (18 overs)
Ross Taylor 23 (22); Mujeeb Ur Rahman 3/11 (4 overs)		Nkrumah Bonner 30* (32); Naveen-ul-Haq 2/35 (4 overs)

Jamaica Tallawahs won by 5 wickets
Queen's Park Oval, Port of Spain
Umpires: Deighton Butler (WI) and Joel Wilson (WI)
Player of the match: Mujeeb Ur Rahman (Jamaica Tallawahs)

- Jamaica Tallawahs won the toss and elected to field.

26 August 2020
10:00
Scorecard

St Lucia Zouks; 111/6 (17.1 overs)	v	Trinbago Knight Riders; 72/4 (8 overs)
Mohammad Nabi 30* (22); Dwayne Bravo 2/7 (3 overs)		Darren Bravo 23* (13); Kesrick Williams 2/17 (2 overs)

Trinbago Knight Riders won by 6 wickets (DLS method)
Queen's Park Oval, Port of Spain
Umpires: Gregory Brathwaite (WI) and Nigel Duguid (WI)
Player of the match: Dwayne Bravo (Trinbago Knight Riders)

- Trinbago Knight Riders won the toss and elected to field.
- Rain stopped play during St Lucia Zouks' innings. Trinbago Knight Riders were set a revised target of 72 runs from 9 overs.
- Pravin Tambe (Trinbago Knight Riders) became the first Indian cricketer to play in the CPL.
- Dwayne Bravo (Trinbago Knight Riders) became the first bowler to take 500 wickets in T20 cricket, and the first bowler to take 100 wickets in the CPL.

26 August 2020
17:30 (D/N)
Scorecard

Barbados Tridents; 148/7 (20 overs)	v	Jamaica Tallawahs; 112/9 (20 overs)
Kyle Mayers 85 (59); Mujeeb Ur Rahman 3/14 (4 overs)		Nkrumah Bonner 31 (28); Mitchell Santner 2/10 (4 overs)

Barbados Tridents won by 36 runs
Queen's Park Oval, Port of Spain
Umpires: Deighton Butler (WI) and Leslie Reifer (WI)
Player of the match: Kyle Mayers (Barbados Tridents)

- Jamaica Tallawahs won the toss and elected to field.

27 August 2020
10:00
Scorecard

St Kitts & Nevis Patriots; 110/9 (20 overs)	v	St Lucia Zouks; 111/4 (14.4 overs)
Ben Dunk 33 (37); Mohammad Nabi 5/15 (4 overs)		Najibullah Zadran 33 (24); Imran Khan 3/23 (4 overs)

St Lucia Zouks won by 6 wickets
Queen's Park Oval, Port of Spain
Umpires: Zahid Bassarath (WI) and Nigel Duguid (WI)
Player of the match: Mohammad Nabi (St Lucia Zouks)

- St Lucia Zouks won the toss and elected to field.
- Mohammad Nabi (St Lucia Zouks) took his first five-wicket haul in a T20 match.

27 August 2020
17:30 (D/N)
Scorecard

Guyana Amazon Warriors; 112/7 (20 overs)	v	Trinbago Knight Riders; 115/3 (18.2 overs)
Keemo Paul 28* (26); Khary Pierre 3/18 (4 overs)		Tim Seifert 39* (30); Imran Tahir 2/25 (4 overs)

Trinbago Knight Riders won by 7 wickets
Queen's Park Oval, Port of Spain
Umpires: Leslie Reifer (WI) and Joel Wilson (WI)
Player of the match: Khary Pierre (Trinbago Knight Riders)

- Trinbago Knight Riders won the toss and elected to field.

29 August 2020
10:00
Scorecard

Barbados Tridents; 148/7 (20 overs)	v	Trinbago Knight Riders; 149/8 (19.5 overs)
Johnson Charles 47 (37); Sikandar Raza 2/11 (1 over)		Kieron Pollard 72 (28); Jason Holder 2/27 (4 overs)

Trinbago Knight Riders won by 2 wickets
Queen's Park Oval, Port of Spain
Umpires: Zahid Bassarath (WI) and Gregory Brathwaite (WI)
Player of the match: Kieron Pollard (Trinbago Knight Riders)

- Trinbago Knight Riders won the toss and elected to field.

29 August 2020
14:15
Scorecard

Jamaica Tallawahs; 147/6 (20 overs)	v	St Kitts & Nevis Patriots; 110 (19.4 overs)
Glenn Phillips 79* (61); Rayad Emrit 3/32 (4 overs)		Evin Lewis 21 (16); Carlos Brathwaite 3/11 (3.4 overs)

Jamaica Tallawahs won by 37 runs
Queen's Park Oval, Port of Spain
Umpires: Deighton Butler (WI) and Joel Wilson (WI)
Player of the match: Glenn Phillips (Jamaica Tallawahs)

- Jamaica Tallawahs won the toss and elected to bat.

30 August 2020
10:00
Scorecard

St Lucia Zouks; 92 (18 overs)	v	Barbados Tridents; 89/7 (20 overs)
Najibullah Zadran 22 (31); Hayden Walsh Jr. 3/19 (4 overs)		Johnson Charles 39 (42); Javelle Glen 2/11 (3 overs)

St Lucia Zouks won by 3 runs
Queen's Park Oval, Port of Spain
Umpires: Gregory Brathwaite (WI) and Nigel Duguid (WI)
Player of the match: Javelle Glen (St Lucia Zouks)

- Barbados Tridents won the toss and elected to field.
- St Lucia Zouks set a new record for defending the lowest total in a match in the CPL.

30 August 2020
14:15
Scorecard

St Kitts & Nevis Patriots; 150/5 (20 overs)	v	Guyana Amazon Warriors; 153/3 (17.3 overs)
Joshua Da Silva 59 (46); Chris Green 2/31 (4 overs)		Nicholas Pooran 100* (45); Jon-Russ Jaggesar 2/33 (4 overs)

Guyana Amazon Warriors won by 7 wickets
Queen's Park Oval, Port of Spain
Umpires: Deighton Butler (WI) and Leslie Reifer (WI)
Player of the match: Nicholas Pooran (Guyana Amazon Warriors)

- Guyana Amazon Warriors won the toss and elected to field.
- Kevin Sinclair (Guyana Amazon Warriors) made his T20 debut.
- Nicholas Pooran (Guyana Amazon Warriors) scored his first century in a T20 match.

1 September 2020
10:00
Scorecard

Trinbago Knight Riders; 184/4 (20 overs)	v	Jamaica Tallawahs; 165/6 (20 overs)
Colin Munro 65 (54); Carlos Brathwaite 2/36 (4 overs)		Andre Russell 50* (23); Fawad Ahmed 2/21 (3 overs)

Trinbago Knight Riders won by 19 runs
Brian Lara Cricket Academy, Tarouba
Umpires: Zahid Bassarath (WI) and Nigel Duguid (WI)
Player of the match: Colin Munro (Trinbago Knight Riders)

- Jamaica Tallawahs won the toss and elected to field.

1 September 2020
17:30 (D/N)
Scorecard

Barbados Tridents; 92 (20 overs)	v	Guyana Amazon Warriors; 93/2 (16.4 overs)
Mitchell Santner 36 (27); Naveen-ul-Haq 4/14 (4 overs)		Brandon King 51* (49); Hayden Walsh Jr. 1/9 (2 overs)

Guyana Amazon Warriors won by 8 wickets
Brian Lara Cricket Academy, Tarouba
Umpires: Leslie Reifer (WI) and Joel Wilson (WI)
Player of the match: Naveen-ul-Haq (Guyana Amazon Warriors)

- Barbados Tridents won the toss and elected to bat.
- Kissoondath Magram (Guyana Amazon Warriors) made his T20 debut.

2 September 2020
10:00
Scorecard

Trinbago Knight Riders; 174/4 (20 overs)	v	St Kitts & Nevis Patriots; 115/7 (20 overs)
Lendl Simmons 96 (63); Dominic Drakes 2/35 (4 overs)		Chris Lynn 34 (46); Sikandar Raza 3/15 (3 overs)

Trinbago Knight Riders won by 59 runs
Brian Lara Cricket Academy, Tarouba
Umpires: Deighton Butler (WI) and Joel Wilson (WI)
Player of the match: Lendl Simmons (Trinbago Knight Riders)

- St Kitts & Nevis Patriots won the toss and elected to field.
- Amir Jangoo (Trinbago Knight Riders) made his T20 debut.

2 September 2020
17:30 (D/N)
Scorecard

St Lucia Zouks; 109/7 (20 overs)	v	Guyana Amazon Warriors; 110/3 (13.5 overs)
Javelle Glen 23* (22); Naveen-ul-Haq 2/24 (4 overs)		Shimron Hetmyer 56* (36); Javelle Glen 1/9 (1 over)

Guyana Amazon Warriors won by 7 wickets
Brian Lara Cricket Academy, Tarouba
Umpires: Zahid Bassarath (WI) and Gregory Brathwaite (WI)
Player of the match: Shimron Hetmyer (Guyana Amazon Warriors)

- Guyana Amazon Warriors won the toss and elected to field.

3 September 2020
10:00
Scorecard

St Kitts & Nevis Patriots; 46/0 (5.4 overs)	v	Jamaica Tallawahs
Chris Lynn 23* (15)

No result
Brian Lara Cricket Academy, Tarouba
Umpires: Deighton Butler (WI) and Leslie Reifer (WI)

- Jamaica Tallawahs won the toss and elected to field.
- No further play was possible due to rain.
- Colin Archibald (St Kitts & Nevis Patriots) made his T20 debut.

3 September 2020
17:30 (D/N)
Scorecard

Barbados Tridents; 89/9 (20 overs)	v	Guyana Amazon Warriors; 90/4 (14.2 overs)
Nyeem Young 18 (17); Imran Tahir 3/12 (4 overs)		Shimron Hetmyer 32* (33); Jason Holder 2/10 (4 overs)

Guyana Amazon Warriors won by 6 wickets
Brian Lara Cricket Academy, Tarouba
Umpires: Gregory Brathwaite (WI) and Nigel Duguid (WI)
Player of the match: Romario Shepherd (Guyana Amazon Warriors)

- Guyanana Amazon Warriors won the toss and elected to field.

5 September 2020
10:00
Scorecard

Trinbago Knight Riders; 175/5 (20 overs)	v	St Lucia Zouks; 152/7 (20 overs)
Darren Bravo 50 (42); Scott Kuggeleijn 2/35 (4 overs)		Andre Fletcher 42 (27); Kieron Pollard 3/35 (4 overs)

Trinbago Knight Riders won by 23 runs
Brian Lara Cricket Academy, Tarouba
Umpires: Leslie Reifer (WI) and Joel Wilson (WI)
Player of the match: Kieron Pollard (Trinbago Knight Riders)

- St Lucia Zouks won the toss and elected to field.

5 September 2020
14:15
Scorecard

Jamaica Tallawahs; 161/4 (20 overs)	v	Barbados Tridents; 165/3 (18.2 overs)
Jermaine Blackwood 74 (59); Joshua Bishop 1/30 (4 overs)		Jason Holder 69 (42); Sandeep Lamichhane 1/26 (4 overs)

Barbados Tridents won by 7 wickets
Brian Lara Cricket Academy, Tarouba
Umpires: Zahid Bassarath (WI) and Nigel Duguid (WI)
Player of the match: Jason Holder (Barbados Tridents)

- Jamaica Tallawahs won the toss and elected to bat.
- Keon Harding, Shayan Jahangir (Barbados Tridents) and Preston McSween (Jamaica Tallawahs) all made their T20 debuts.

6 September 2020
10:00
Scorecard

St Kitts & Nevis Patriots; 77 (18.2 overs)	v	Trinbago Knight Riders; 78/1 (11.3 overs)
Denesh Ramdin 19 (18); Fawad Ahmed 4/21 (4 overs)		Tion Webster 41* (33); Rayad Emrit 1/14 (3 overs)

Trinbago Knight Riders won by 9 wickets
Brian Lara Cricket Academy, Tarouba
Umpires: Deighton Butler (WI) and Joel Wilson (WI)
Player of the match: Fawad Ahmed (Trinbago Knight Riders)

- St Kitts & Nevis Patriots won the toss and elected to field.

6 September 2020
14:15
Scorecard

St Lucia Zouks; 145/6 (20 overs)	v	Jamaica Tallawahs; 134/9 (20 overs)
Najibullah Zadran 35 (25); Mujeeb Ur Rahman 2/28 (4 overs)		Glenn Phillips 49 (36); Javelle Glen 3/16 (4 overs)

St Lucia Zouks won by 11 runs
Brian Lara Cricket Academy, Tarouba
Umpires: Zahid Bassarath (WI) and Gregory Brathwaite (WI)
Player of the match: Zahir Khan (St Lucia Zouks)

- St Lucia Zouks won the toss and elected to bat.

== Playoffs ==
Semi-finals
1	Trinbago Knight Riders	111/1 (15 overs)
4	Jamaica Tallawahs	107/7 (20 overs)
2	Guyana Amazon Warriors	55 (13.4 overs)
3	St Lucia Zouks	56/0 (4.3 overs)

Final
1	Trinbago Knight Riders	157/2 (18.1 overs)
3	St Lucia Zouks	154 (19.1 overs)

=== Semi final 1 ===
8 September 2020
10:00
Scorecard

Jamaica Tallawahs; 107/7 (20 overs)	v	Trinbago Knight Riders; 111/1 (15 overs)
Nkrumah Bonner 41 (42); Akeal Hosein 3/14 (4 overs)		Lendl Simmons 54* (44); Mujeeb Ur Rahman 1/18 (3 overs)

Trinbago Knight Riders won by 9 wickets
Brian Lara Cricket Academy, Tarouba
Umpires: Deighton Butler (WI) and Nigel Duguid (WI)
Player of the match: Akeal Hosein (Trinbago Knight Riders)

- Trinbago Knight Riders won the toss and elected to field.

=== Semi final 2 ===
8 September 2020
17:30 (D/N)
Scorecard

Guyana Amazon Warriors; 55 (13.4 overs)	v	St Lucia Zouks; 56/0 (4.3 overs)
Chandrapaul Hemraj 25 (26); Mark Deyal 2/2 (1 over)		Rahkeem Cornwall 32* (17)

St Lucia Zouks won by 10 wickets
Brian Lara Cricket Academy, Tarouba
Umpires: Gregory Brathwaite (WI) and Leslie Reifer (WI)
Player of the match: Mark Deyal (St Lucia Zouks)

- St Lucia Zouks won the toss and elected to field.

=== Final ===
10 September 2020
10:00
Scorecard

St Lucia Zouks; 154 (19.1 overs)	v	Trinbago Knight Riders; 157/2 (18.1 overs)
Andre Fletcher 39 (27); Kieron Pollard 4/30 (4 overs)		Lendl Simmons 84* (49); Roston Chase 1/13 (4 overs)

Trinbago Knight Riders won by 8 wickets
Brian Lara Cricket Academy, Tarouba
Umpires: Gregory Brathwaite (WI) and Deighton Butler (WI)
Player of the match: Lendl Simmons (Trinbago Knight Riders)

- Trinbago Knight Riders won the toss and elected to field.

== Statistics ==
=== Most runs ===
Player	Team	Matches	Runs	High score
Lendl Simmons	Trinbago Knight Riders	11	356	96
Glenn Phillips	Jamaica Tallawahs	11	316	79 not out
Darren Bravo	Trinbago Knight Riders	12	297	58 not out
Shimron Hetmyer	Guyana Amazon Warriors	11	267	71
Nicholas Pooran	Guyana Amazon Warriors	11	245	100 not out

- Source: Cricinfo

=== Most wickets ===
Player	Team	Matches	Wickets	Best bowling
Scott Kuggeleijn	St Lucia Zouks	11	17	4/33
Mujeeb Ur Rahman	Jamaica Tallawahs	11	16	3/11
Imran Tahir	Guyana Amazon Warriors	11	15	3/12
Fawad Ahmed	Trinbago Knight Riders	11	13	4/21
Kesrick Williams	St Lucia Zouks	12	13	2/12

- Source: Cricinfo
