= Afghan cricket team in the West Indies in 2017 =

International cricket tour

	West Indies	Afghanistan
- Dates: 30 May – 14 June 2017
Captains	Carlos Brathwaite (T20Is); Jason Holder (ODIs)	Asghar Stanikzai

One Day International series
- Results: 3-match series drawn 1–1
Most runs	Shai Hope (83)	Gulbadin Naib (92)
Most wickets	Ashley Nurse (4)	Rashid Khan (10)

Twenty20 International series
- Results: West Indies won the 3-match series 3–0
Most runs	Marlon Samuels (146)	Mohammad Nabi (48)
Most wickets	Kesrick Williams (8)	Shapoor Zadran (3)
- Player of the series: Marlon Samuels (WI)

The Afghanistan cricket team toured the West Indies in June 2017 to play three One Day Internationals (ODIs), three Twenty20 Internationals (T20Is) and a tour match. It was Afghanistan's second bilateral tour against a full member nation after Zimbabwe. Originally the tour was going to consist of five ODIs and three T20Is. The West Indies won the T20I series 3–0. The ODI series was drawn 1–1 after the final match was washed out with no result.

== Squads ==
ODIs		T20Is	
West Indies	Afghanistan	West Indies	Afghanistan
Jason Holder (c); Devendra Bishoo; Jonathan Carter; Roston Chase; Miguel Cummins; Shannon Gabriel; Shai Hope; Alzarri Joseph; Evin Lewis; Jason Mohammed; Ashley Nurse; Kieran Powell; Rovman Powell	Asghar Stanikzai (c); Farid Ahmad; Javed Ahmadi; Usman Ghani; Amir Hamza; Nasir Jamal; Rashid Khan; Mohammad Nabi; Gulbadin Naib; Shafiqullah Shafaq; Samiullah Shinwari; Dawlat Zadran; Noor Ali Zadran; Shapoor Zadran; Afsar Zazai; Rahmat Shah Zurmatai	Carlos Brathwaite (c); Samuel Badree; Ronsford Beaton; Evin Lewis; Jason Mohammed; Sunil Narine; Kieron Pollard; Rovman Powell; Marlon Samuels; Lendl Simmons; Jerome Taylor; Chadwick Walton; Kesrick Williams	Asghar Stanikzai (c); Farid Ahmad; Javed Ahmadi; Usman Ghani; Amir Hamza; Karim Janat; Rashid Khan; Mohammad Nabi; Gulbadin Naib; Samiullah Shinwari; Shafiqullah Shafaq; Dawlat Zadran; Najibullah Zadran; Noor Ali Zadran; Shapoor Zadran

== Tour match ==
30 May 2017 (D/N)
Scorecard

Afghanistan; 115/9 (20 overs)	v	West Indies Cricket Board President's XI; 103/9 (20 overs)
Usman Ghani 33 (34); Miguel Cummins 3/19 (4 overs)		Johnson Charles 53 (44); Rashid Khan 3/11 (4 overs)

Afghanistan won by 12 runs
Warner Park, Basseterre
Umpires: Gregory Brathwaite (WI) and Nigel Duguid (WI)

- Afghanistan won the toss and elected to bat.

== T20I series ==
=== 1st T20I ===
2 June 2017 (D/N)
Scorecard

Afghanistan; 110 (20 overs)	v	West Indies; 114/4 (16.3 overs)
Rashid Khan 33 (27); Sunil Narine 3/11 (4 overs)		Marlon Samuels 35 (36); Shapoor Zadran 2/30 (3.3 overs)

West Indies won by 6 wickets
Warner Park, Basseterre
Umpires: Gregory Brathwaite (WI) and Nigel Duguid (WI)
Player of the match: Sunil Narine (WI)

- Afghanistan won the toss and elected to bat.
- This result ended Afghanistan's eleven match winning streak, a T20I record.

=== 2nd T20I ===
3 June 2017 (D/N)
Scorecard

West Indies; 112/3 (15 overs)	v	Afghanistan; 93 (13.3 overs)
Chadwick Walton 29 (17); Gulbadin Naib 1/10 (2 overs)		Karim Janat 20 (15); Kesrick Williams 3/11 (2.3 overs)

West Indies won by 29 runs (DLS method)
Warner Park, Basseterre
Umpires: Gregory Brathwaite (WI) and Joel Wilson (WI)
Player of the match: Kesrick Williams (WI)

- West Indies won the toss and elected to bat.
- The match was reduced to 15 overs per side due to rain with Afghanistan set a revised target of 123 runs.

=== 3rd T20I ===
5 June 2017 (D/N)
Scorecard

Afghanistan; 146/6 (20 overs)	v	West Indies; 147/3 (19.2 overs)
Mohammad Nabi 38 (30); Kesrick Williams 3/34 (4 overs)		Marlon Samuels 89* (66); Rashid Khan 1/22 (4 overs)

West Indies won by 7 wickets
Warner Park, Basseterre
Umpires: Leslie Reifer (WI) and Joel Wilson (WI)
Player of the match: Marlon Samuels (WI)

- Afghanistan won the toss and elected to bat.

== ODI series ==
=== 1st ODI ===
9 June 2017 (D/N)
Scorecard

Afghanistan; 212/6 (50 overs)	v	West Indies; 149 (44.4 overs)
Javed Ahmadi 81 (102); Ashley Nurse 2/34 (10 overs)		Shai Hope 35 (63); Rashid Khan 7/18 (8.4 overs)

Afghanistan won by 63 runs
Daren Sammy Cricket Ground, Gros Islet
Umpires: Chettithody Shamshuddin (Ind) and Joel Wilson (WI)
Player of the match: Rashid Khan (Afg)

- Afghanistan won the toss and elected to bat.
- Roston Chase (WI) made his ODI debut.
- Rashid Khan (Afg) recorded the fourth-best bowling figures in ODIs.
- This was the first win by Afghanistan against the West Indies and their first win against a Test team other than Bangladesh or Zimbabwe in ODIs.

=== 2nd ODI ===
11 June 2017 (D/N)
Scorecard

Afghanistan; 135 (37.3 overs)	v	West Indies; 138/6 (39.2 overs)
Gulbadin Naib 51 (73); Alzarri Joseph 2/15 (6 overs)		Shai Hope 48* (77); Rashid Khan 3/26 (10 overs)

West Indies won by 4 wickets
Daren Sammy Cricket Ground, Gros Islet
Umpires: Nigel Duguid (WI) and Chettithody Shamshuddin (Ind)
Player of the match: Shai Hope (WI)

- Afghanistan won the toss and elected to bat.

=== 3rd ODI ===
14 June 2017 (D/N)
Scorecard

Afghanistan	v	West Indies

No result
Daren Sammy Cricket Ground, Gros Islet
Umpires: Leslie Reifer (WI) and Chettithody Shamshuddin (Ind)

- Afghanistan won the toss and elected to bat.
- Rain reduced the match initially to 43 overs per side but it continued after the toss, with no play possible.
- Leslie Reifer (WI) stood in his first ODI match as an umpire.
