= Kissoondath Magram =

West Indian cricketer

Personal information
- Full name: Kissoondath Magram

Career statistics
Competition	FC	T20
Matches	1	1
Runs scored	4	-
Batting average	-	-
100s/50s	0/0	-/-
Top score	4*	-
Balls bowled	142	6
Wickets	3	0
Bowling average	30.66	-
5 wickets in innings	0	0
10 wickets in match	0	0
Best bowling	2/56	0/12
Catches/stumpings	0/–	0/–
- Source: Cricinfo, 10 October 2021

Kissoondath Magram is a West Indian cricketer. He made his first-class debut on 16 January 2020, for Trinidad and Tobago in the 2019–20 West Indies Championship. In August 2020, he was added to the Guyana Amazon Warriors' squad for the 2020 Caribbean Premier League (CPL). He made his Twenty20 debut on 1 September 2020, for the Guyana Amazon Warriors in the 2020 CPL.
