= Saxacalli =

- Village
- Location in Guyana
- Coordinates: 6°35′N 58°37′W
- Country: Guyana
- Region: Essequibo Islands-West Demerara

Population (2012)
  - Total: 105

Saxacalli (also Saxakalli), located on the west bank of the Essequibo River some 25 miles (40 km) south of Parika at 6°35′N 58°37′W. The village was originally an Arawak community, and has existed since the late 17th century.

Its population of about 105 people as of 2012.

Saxacalli is an Arawak word for Kingfisher. Near the village is the Saxacalli Rainforest Centre (SRC), one of the first private nature reserves.

== See also ==
- Bartica, Guyana
