= Keemo Paul =

West Indian cricketer (born 1998)

Personal information
- Full name: Keemo Mandela Angus Paul
- Born: 21 February 1998 (age 28); Saxacalli, Guyana
- Batting: Right-handed
- Bowling: Right-arm fast-medium
- Role: All-rounder

International information
- National side: West Indies (2018-present)
- Test debut (cap 315): 12 July 2018 v Bangladesh
- Last Test: 9 February 2019 v England
- ODI debut (cap 184): 15 March 2018 v Afghanistan
- Last ODI: 5 July 2023 v Oman
- T20I debut (cap 71): 1 April 2018 v Pakistan
- Last T20I: 7 August 2022 v India

Domestic team information
- Years: Team
- 2016–present: Guyana
- 2017–2020,2022–present: Guyana Amazon Warriors
- 2019: Delhi Capitals
- 2020/21: Hobart Hurricanes
- 2021–2022: Colombo Stars
- 2021: Saint Lucia Kings
- 2023–2024: Durban's Super Giants
- 2024: Seattle Orcas
- 2024: Sharjah Warriorz

Career statistics
Competition	Test	ODI	T20I	FC
Matches	3	30	23	31
Runs scored	96	320	187	1072
Batting average	16.0	21.33	20.77	23.82
100s/50s	0/0	0/0	0/0	1/4
Top score	47	46*	29	107
Balls bowled	342	1253	462	4405
Wickets	6	34	25	118
Bowling average	31.5	36.41	28.00	20.05
5 wickets in innings	0	0	1	4
10 wickets in match	0	0	0	1
Best bowling	2/25	3/34	5/15	6/28
Catches/stumpings	2/0	15/0	3/0	19/0
- Source: ESPNcricinfo, 7 April 2025

Keemo Mandela Angus Paul (born 21 February 1998) is a Guyanese cricket right-handed batter and right-arm fast-medium bowler who plays for the West Indies and Guyana, as well as the Caribbean Premier League team Guyana Amazon Warriors. He made his senior international debut for the West Indies in 2018. In August 2019, Cricket West Indies named him as the T20 Player of the Year.

== Early life ==
Paul was born and raised in Saxacalli, a small fishing village on the Essequibo river.

== Domestic and T20 career ==
He made his List A debut on 16 January 2015 in the 2014–15 Regional Super50 tournament.

In December 2015, Paul was named in the West Indies squad for the 2016 Under-19 Cricket World Cup. During the tournament, Paul attracted some controversy when he mankaded a batsman in the last over of the final group match between the West Indies and Zimbabwe. The West Indies won the match and consequently finished second in their group, qualifying for the quarter-finals and eventually going on to win the tournament. He took 7 wickets throughout the competition, including 2 in the final against India, as well as averaging more than 40 with the bat for the tournament.

He made his first-class debut for Guyana in the 2016–17 Regional Four Day Competition on 18 March 2017. He made his Twenty20 debut for Guyana Amazon Warriors in the 2017 Caribbean Premier League on 5 August 2017. In October 2017, he scored his maiden century in first-class cricket, batting for Guyana against Jamaica in the 2017–18 Regional Four Day Competition.

In June 2018, he was named the Emerging Cricketer of the Year at the annual Cricket West Indies' Awards. In October 2018, Cricket West Indies (CWI) awarded him a development contract for the 2018–19 season.

In December 2018, he was bought by the Delhi Capitals in the player auction for the 2019 Indian Premier League. In June 2019, he was selected to play for the Montreal Tigers franchise team in the 2019 Global T20 Canada tournament. In July 2020, he was named in the Guyana Amazon Warriors squad for the 2020 Caribbean Premier League.

On 18 August 2026, Paul registered his highest T20 score, smashing 65 runs off 36 balls while batting for the Jamaica Kingsmen against the Antigua and Barbuda Falcons during the CPL.He won player of the match as the Kingsmen won by 51 runs.

== International career ==
On 9 March 2018, Paul was added to the West Indies squad for the 2018 Cricket World Cup Qualifier tournament, after Sheldon Cottrell suffered an injury. He made his One Day International (ODI) debut for the West Indies against Afghanistan in the World Cup Qualifier on 15 March 2018.

In March 2018, he was named in the West Indies squad for their Twenty20 International (T20I) series against Pakistan. He made his T20I debut for the West Indies against Pakistan on 1 April 2018.

In July 2018, he was named in the West Indies Test squad for the series against Bangladesh. He made his Test debut for the West Indies on 12 July 2018. In December 2018, in the third and final T20I against Bangladesh, Paul took his first five-wicket haul in T20Is.

In May 2019, Cricket West Indies (CWI) named him as one of ten reserve players in the West Indies' squad for the 2019 Cricket World Cup.
