= Odean Smith =

Jamaican cricketer (born 1996)

Personal information
- Full name: Odean Fabian Smith
- Born: 1 November 1996 (age 30); St. Elizabeth, Jamaica
- Batting: Right-handed
- Bowling: Right arm fast-medium
- Role: Bowling all-rounder

International information
- National side: West Indies (2018-2023)
- ODI debut (cap 209): 8 January 2022 v Ireland
- Last ODI: 6 June 2023 v UAE
- T20I debut (cap 73): 2 April 2018 v Pakistan
- Last T20I: 12 August 2023 v India

Domestic team information
- Years: Team
- 2017–present: Jamaica (squad no. 15)
- 2018/19: Trinidad and Tobago
- 2017: Jamaica Tallawahs
- 2018: St Lucia Zouks
- 2019–2023: Guyana Amazon Warriors (squad no. 15)
- 2022: Punjab Kings (squad no. 15)
- 2023: Gujarat Titans
- 2023: Quetta Gladiators (squad no. 58)
- 2024: St Kitts & Nevis Patriots
- 2025: Hobart Hurricanes
- 2025: Antigua & Barbuda Falcons

Career statistics
Competition	ODI	T20I	FC	LA
Matches	9	27	24	57
Runs scored	199	193	865	948
Batting average	28.42	14.84	21.62	28.72
100s/50s	0/0	0/0	0/5	0/3
Top score	46	27*	73	68*
Balls bowled	283	450	2,463	1,896
Wickets	10	27	50	64
Bowling average	26.10	28.59	33.54	28.46
5 wickets in innings	0	0	1	1
10 wickets in match	0	0	0	0
Best bowling	2/26	3/29	5/68	5/65
Catches/stumpings	1/0	12/0	19/0	24/0
- Source: Cricinfo, 9 July 2026

Odean Fabian Smith (born 1 November 1996) is a Jamaican cricketer. He made his international debut for the West Indies cricket team in April 2018.

== Domestic and T20 franchise career ==
Smith made his List A debut on 16 January 2015 in the 2014–15 Regional Super50 tournament. He made his Twenty20 debut for Jamaica Tallawahs in the 2017 Caribbean Premier League on 8 August 2017. He made his first-class debut for Jamaica in the 2017–18 Regional Four Day Competition on 7 December 2017.

In May 2018, Smith was selected to play for the Trinidad and Tobago national cricket team in the Professional Cricket League draft, ahead of the 2018–19 season. In November 2019, he was named in Trinidad and Tobago's squad for the 2019–20 Regional Super50 tournament.

In June 2020, Smith was selected by Jamaica, in the players' draft hosted by Cricket West Indies ahead of the 2020–21 domestic season. In July 2020, he was named in the Guyana Amazon Warriors squad for the 2020 Caribbean Premier League.

In November 2021, Smith was selected to play for the Dambulla Giants following the players' draft for the 2021 Lanka Premier League. In February 2022, he was bought by the Punjab Kings in the auction for the 2022 Indian Premier League tournament. He is bought by Gujarat Titans to play in the IPL 2023 season for INR. 50 Lakh in the IPL auction held on 23 December 2022.

== International career ==
In December 2015, Smith was named in the West Indies’ squad for the 2016 Under-19 Cricket World Cup.

In March 2018, Smith was named in the West Indies squad for their Twenty20 International (T20I) series against Pakistan. He made his T20I debut for the West Indies against Pakistan on 2 April 2018.

In November 2021, Smith was named in the West Indies' One Day International (ODI) and Twenty20 International (T20I) squads for their series against Pakistan. In December 2021, he was named in the West Indies' ODI squad for their series against Ireland. He made his ODI debut on 8 January 2022, for the West Indies against Ireland.
