= Brandon King (cricketer) =

West Indian cricketer (born 1994)

Personal information
- Full name: Brandon Alexander King
- Born: 16 December 1994 (age 31); Kingston, Jamaica
- Batting: Right-handed
- Role: Top-order batter

International information
- National side: West Indies (2019–present)
- Test debut (cap 343): 25 June 2025 v Australia
- Last Test: 3 July 2026 v Sri Lanka
- ODI debut (cap 195): 11 November 2019 v Afghanistan
- Last ODI: 23 October 2025 v Bangladesh
- T20I debut (cap 81): 14 November 2019 v Afghanistan
- Last T20I: 14 June 2026 v Sri Lanka

Domestic team information
- Years: Team
- 2015–present: Jamaica
- 2017–2018: St Kitts & Nevis Patriots
- 2019–2021: Guyana Amazon Warriors
- 2021: Islamabad United
- 2022–2023: Jamaica Tallawahs
- 2023: Abu Dhabi Knight Riders
- 2023: Rangpur Riders
- 2024: Antigua & Barbuda Falcons
- 2025: Durban's Super Giants
- 2025-present: Barbados Royals

Career statistics
Competition	Test	ODI	T20I	FC
Matches	8	58	87	51
Runs scored	431	1,530	2,028	3,085
Batting average	30.78	27.32	25.35	33.90
100s/50s	0/4	3/8	0/14	3/24
Top score	75	112	85*	194
Balls bowled	0	0	0	65
Wickets	0	0	0	1
Bowling average	–	–	–	38.00
5 wickets in innings	0	0	0	0
10 wickets in match	0	–	–	0
Best bowling	–	–	–	1/4
Catches/stumpings	6/–	21/–	34/–	40/–
- Source: Cricinfo, 9 July 2026

Brandon Alexander King (born 16 December 1994) is a Jamaican cricketer. He was part of the West Indies' squad for the 2014 ICC Under-19 Cricket World Cup. He made his international debut for the West Indies cricket team in November 2019.

== Domestic career ==
King plays for Jamaica in domestic cricket, debuting in first-class cricket in the 2014-15 Regional Four Day Competition, and List A cricket in the 2015-16 Regional Super50. He was selected in the 9th round of the 2017 CPL player draft by the St Kitts & Nevis Patriots. He made his Twenty20 debut for St Kitts & Nevis Patriots in the 2017 Caribbean Premier League on 5 August 2017.

In June 2018, King was named in the Cricket West Indies B Team squad for the inaugural edition of the Global T20 Canada tournament.

King hit 132 not out, the highest innings in CPL history, consisting of 10 fours and 11 sixes in a 72-ball knock against Barbados Tridents at Providence on 6 October 2019 as Guyana Amazon Warriors qualified for the final of the 2019 Caribbean Premier League. In July 2020, he was named in the Guyana Amazon Warriors squad for the 2020 Caribbean Premier League. On 1 September 2020, King scored his 1,000th run in Twenty20 cricket.

== International career ==
In October 2019, King was named in the West Indies' One Day International (ODI) and Twenty20 International (T20I) squads for their series against Afghanistan in India. He made his ODI debut for the West Indies, against Afghanistan, on 11 November 2019. He made his T20I debut for the West Indies, also against Afghanistan, on 14 November 2019.

In May 2024, he was named in the West Indies squad for the 2024 ICC Men's T20 World Cup tournament.
