= Kesrick Williams =

West Indian cricketer (born 1990)

Personal information
- Full name: Kesrick Omari Kenal Williams
- Born: 8 January 1990 (age 36); Spring Village, Saint Vincent and the Grenadines
- Batting: Right-handed
- Bowling: Right-arm fast-medium
- Role: Bowler

International information
- National side: West Indies (2016–2020)
- ODI debut (cap 180): 30 June 2017 v India
- Last ODI: 10 March 2018 v Ireland
- T20I debut (cap 65): 27 September 2016 v Pakistan
- Last T20I: 27 November 2020 v New Zealand

Domestic team information
- Years: Team
- 2011: Windward Islands
- 2013–2014: Combined Campuses
- 2016–2017: Jamaica Tallawahs
- 2016-2017: Rajshahi Kings
- 2018-present: St Lucia Zouks
- 2019/20: Chattogram Challengers
- 2021: Pokhara Rhinos
- 2022: Sylhet Sunrisers

Career statistics
Competition	ODI	T20I	LA	T20
Matches	8	26	27	109
Runs scored	19	19	34	85
Batting average	19.00	6.33	3.40	7.08
100s/50s	0/0	0/0	0/0	0/0
Top score	16*	13*	16*	18*
Balls bowled	330	551	1,041	2,180
Wickets	9	41	34	140
Bowling average	32.55	19.63	30.97	22.51
5 wickets in innings	0	0	0	0
10 wickets in match	0	0	0	0
Best bowling	4/43	4/28	4/43	4/11
Catches/stumpings	0/–	8/–	4/–	26/–
- Source: ESPNcricinfo, 1 August 2022

Kesrick Omari Kenal Williams (born 8 January 1990) is a Vincentian cricketer who has played for several teams in West Indian domestic cricket. He made his first-class debut in 2011, for the Windward Islands, and later appeared for the Combined Campuses, but rose to prominence only in 2016, when he was the leading wicket-taker for the Jamaica Tallawahs in the 2016 Caribbean Premier League.

== Domestic and T20 franchise career ==
Williams was born in Spring Village, Saint Vincent and the Grenadines. He made his first-class debut for the Windward Islands in March 2011, playing against the England Lions in the 2010–11 Regional Four Day Competition. For the 2012–13 season, Williams switched to the Combined Campuses and Colleges, going on to play in the final of the 2012–13 Regional Super50 (a limited-overs competition). However, he made only irregular appearances for the team during the 2013–14 season, and subsequently did not return to top-level West Indian domestic cricket until 2016, when he was selected in the Jamaica Tallawahs squad for the 2016 Caribbean Premier League season. In that tournament, Williams played in all thirteen of his team's matches, and took 17 wickets, the most for his team and the third-most overall (behind Dwayne Bravo and Sohail Tanvir). His best performance was 4/37 against the Guyana Amazon Warriors, while he also took 3/19 against the St Kitts and Nevis Patriots and 2/12 in the Tallawahs' victory over the Amazon Warriors in the final.

On 3 June 2018, he was selected to play for the Toronto Nationals in the players' draft for the inaugural edition of the Global T20 Canada tournament. In November 2019, he was selected to play for the Chattogram Challengers in the 2019–20 Bangladesh Premier League. In July 2020, he was named in the St Lucia Zouks squad for the 2020 Caribbean Premier League.

== International career ==
In September 2016, Williams was named in the West Indies' Twenty20 International (T20I) squad for its series against Pakistan in the UAE. He was a late replacement for Andre Russell. He made his T20I debut for the West Indies against Pakistan on 27 September 2016.

In June 2017, he was added to the West Indies One Day International (ODI) squad, ahead of the third match against India. He made his ODI debut for the West Indies against India on 30 June 2017. he also was one of two Vincentian cricket players to make their international debut for the West Indies later joined by Obed McCoy
