= 2022–23 West Indies Championship =

Cricket tournament

- Dates: 31 January 2023 – 1 April 2023
- Administrator: CWI
- Cricket format: First-class
- Tournament format: Round-robin
- Champions: Guyana (12th title)
- Participants: 6
- Matches: 15
- Most runs: (British Windward Islands) Alick Athanaze (647)
- Most wickets: (British Leeward Islands) Rahkeem Cornwall (35)

The 2022–23 West Indies Championship was the 55th edition of the Regional Four Day Competition, the domestic first-class cricket competition for the countries of the Cricket West Indies (CWI). It began from 1 February and finished on 1 April 2023. Six teams contested the tournament – Barbados Pride, Guyana Harpy Eagles, Jamaica Scorpions, the Leeward Islands Hurricanes, Trinidad and Tobago Red Force, and the Windward Islands Volcanoes. The series was followed by the Headley Weekes Tri-Series. The first two rounds of fixtures took place in February 2022, followed by a break until 15 March 2022. Barbados were the defending champions.

On the last day of the fifth and final round of matches, Guyana won the tournament and claimed their 12th title.

== Points table ==
Team	Pld	W	L	D	T	Pts
Guyana	5	4	0	1	0	84
Windward Islands	5	3	0	2	0	74.2
Barbados	5	2	3	0	0	55.6
Trinidad and Tobago	5	1	2	2	0	49.4
Leeward Islands	5	1	2	2	0	46.2
Jamaica	5	0	4	1	0	25.6

Champions

== Fixtures ==
=== Round 1 ===
31 January–3 February 2023
Scorecard

Windward Islands	v	Trinidad and Tobago
243 (63.1 overs); Tevyn Walcott 87* (100); Bryan Charles 4/46 (17.1 overs)		315 (92.1 overs); Amir Jangoo 86 (143); Ryan John 5/18 (14.1 overs)
425/5d (113.4 overs); Kimani Melius 192 (269); Bryan Charles 2/92 (24 overs)		225/7 (83 overs); Jason Mohammed 79* (201); Ryan John 3/27 (15 overs)

Match Drawn
Grenada National Stadium, Grenada
Umpires: Gregory Brathwaite and Nigel Duguid
Player of the match: Ryan John (Windward Islands)

- Trinidad and Tobago won the toss and elected to field.
- Vikash Mohan (Trinidad and Tobago) made his first-class debut.
- Points: Trinidad and Tobago 10.2, Windward Islands 8.4.

1–4 February 2023
Scorecard

Guyana	v	Barbados
371 (121.1 overs); Matthew Nandu 126 (337); Jair McAllister 3/43 (18.1 overs)		220 (91.2 overs); Shayne Moseley 65 (107); Veerasammy Permaul 4/53 (26.2 overs)
126/9d (44.1 overs); Veerasammy Permaul 33 (49); Akeem Jordan 3/32 (15 overs)		94 (36 overs); Jonathan Drakes 36 (99); Nial Smith 5/31 (10 overs)

Guyana won by 183 runs
Sir Vivian Richards Stadium, Antigua
Umpires: Patrick Gustard and Carl Tuckett
Player of the match: Veerasammy Permaul (Guyana)

- Barbados won the toss and elected to field.
- Shamar Joseph, Matthew Nandu, Kemol Savory (Guyana), Jonathan Drakes, Zachary McCaskie and Jair McAllister (Barbados) all made their first-class debuts.
- Points: Guyana 20, Barbados 4.8.

1–4 February 2023
Scorecard

Leeward Islands	v	Jamaica
260 (118.3 overs); Jeremiah Louis 78* (170); Marquino Mindley 3/28 (19.3 overs)		234 (82.4 overs); Leroy Lugg 79 (83); Rahkeem Cornwall 5/54 (28 overs)
241 (73.5 overs); Rahkeem Cornwall 85 (95); Jamie Merchant 4/43 (20.5 overs)		200/9 (82 overs); Abhijai Mansingh 62* (208); Rahkeem Cornwall 5/41 (31 overs)

Match drawn
Coolidge Cricket Ground, Antigua
Umpires: Zahid Bassarath and Deighton Butler
Player of the match: Rahkeem Cornwall (Leeward Islands)

- Leeward Islands won the toss and elected to bat.
- Abhijai Mansingh (Jamaica) made his first-class debut.
- Player Replacement: Abhijai Mansingh for Alwyn Williams (Jamaica).
- Points: Leeward Islands 7.4, Jamaica 6.2.

=== Round 2 ===
8–11 February 2023
Scorecard

Windward Islands	v	Guyana
294 (80.5 overs); Alick Athanaze 141 (220); Veerasammy Permaul 4/70 (22.5 overs)		169 (63.1 overs); Veerasammy Permaul 53 (92); Justin Greaves 5/24 (18 overs)
168 (56.3 overs); Justin Greaves 27 (61); Shamar Joseph 5/41 (12 overs)		250/9 (91 overs); Matthew Nandu 60 (123); Preston McSween 3/58 (21 overs)

Match drawn
National Cricket Stadium, Grenada
Umpires: Jonathan Blades and Gregory Brathwaite
Player of the match: Justin Greaves (Windward Islands)

- Windward Islands won the toss and elected to bat.
- Concussion Substitute: Akshaya Persaud for Chandrapaul Hemraj (Guyana).
- Points: Windward Islands 11, Guyana 8.6.

8–11 February 2023
Scorecard

Trinidad and Tobago	v	Leeward Islands
418/9d (126.5 overs); Darren Bravo 100 (229); Jeremiah Louis 3/78 (29 overs)		302 (100.1 overs); Keacy Carty 95 (205); Bryan Charles 4/84 (29.1 overs)
183/5d (43.4 overs); Darren Bravo 100* (153); Kofi James 3/39 (9.4 overs)		72/1 (23 overs); Montcin Hodge 33* (83); Tion Webster 1/11 (4.3 overs)

Match drawn
Sir Vivian Richards Stadium, Antigua
Umpires: Patrick Gustard and Christopher Taylor
Player of the match: Darren Bravo (Trinidad and Tobago)

- Trinidad and Tobago won the toss and elected to bat.
- Points: Trinidad and Tobago 10.4, Leeward Islands 10.

8–10 February 2023
Scorecard

Jamaica	v	Barbados
140 (54.5 overs); Jamie Merchant 35 (23); Shamar Springer 3/11 (9.5 overs)		215 (69.5 overs); Shayne Moseley 82 (149); Patrick Harty 4/23 (12.5 overs)
151 (45.5 overs); Kirk McKenzie 56 (78); Akeem Jordan 4/65 (17 overs)		78/4 (29.2 overs); Zachary McCaskie 26 (76); Patrick Harty 3/26 (9.2 overs)

Barbados won by 6 wickets
Coolidge Cricket Ground, Antigua
Umpires: Deighton Butler and Carl Tuckett
Player of the match: Akeem Jordan (Barbados)

- Jamaica won the toss and elected to bat.
- Tevin Gilzene, Ojay Shields (Jamaica) and Kevin Wickham (Barbados) all made their first-class debuts.
- Points: Barbados 18.2, Jamaica 3.8.

=== Round 3 ===
15–18 March 2023
Scorecard

Guyana	v	Trinidad and Tobago
324 (86.3 overs); Kevin Sinclair 69 (96); Imran Khan 4/86 (20.3 overs)		160 (52 overs); Jason Mohammed 50 (101); Ronsford Beaton 4/31 (13 overs)
247/6d (83 overs); Kemol Savory 101* (222); Darren Bravo 2/23 (9 overs)		268 (97.5 overs); Darren Bravo 95 (170); Veerasammy Permaul 3/58 (32 overs)

Guyana won by 143 runs
Brian Lara Cricket Academy, Trinidad
Umpires: Leslie Reifer and Chris Wright
Player of the match: Kemol Savory (Guyana)

- Trinidad and Tobago won the toss and elected to field.
- Kevlon Anderson (Guyana) and Justin Manick (Trinidad and Tobago) both made their first-class debuts.
- Points: Guyana 20.4, Trinidad and Tobago 4.2.

15–18 March 2023
Scorecard

Windward Islands	v	Jamaica
217 (60.3 overs); Alick Athanaze 81 (111); Derval Green 5/30 (11 overs)		101 (28.3 overs); Derval Green 33 (37); Justin Greaves 6/34 (10.3 overs)
298 (78.5 overs); Alick Athanaze 97 (100); Patrick Harty 3/62 (19 overs)		233 (99.1 overs); Aldane Thomas 55 (102); Shermon Lewis 5/22 (14.1 overs)

Windward Islands won by 181 runs
Providence Stadium, Guyana
Umpires: Ryan Banwarie and Shannon Crawford
Player of the match: Alick Athanaze (Windward Islands)

- Windward Islands won the toss and elected to bat.
- Johann Jeremiah (Windward Islands) made his first-class debut.
- Points: Windward Islands 18.4, Jamaica 5.4.

15–18 March 2023
Scorecard

Barbados	v	Leeward Islands
322 (91.5 overs); Shane Dowrich 124* (201); Rahkeem Cornwall 6/50 (24 overs)		154 (42 overs); Jahmar Hamilton 30 (35); Dominic Drakes 3/38 (13 overs)
78 (23.2 overs); Zachary McCaskie 29 (41); Rahkeem Cornwall 5/19 (7.2 overs)		247/8 (49.2 overs); Kieran Powell 104 (109); Chaim Holder 3/38 (11 overs)

Leeward Islands won by 2 wickets
Queen's Park Oval, Trinidad
Umpires: Zahid Bassarath and Patrick Gustard
Player of the match: Rahkeem Cornwall (Leeward Islands)

- Barbados won the toss and elected to bat.
- Points: Leeward Islands 16.8, Barbados 8.2.

=== Round 4 ===
22–25 March 2023
Scorecard

Trinidad and Tobago	v	Barbados
203 (75.3 overs); Jason Mohammed 55 (141); Chaim Holder 5/71 (18.3 overs)		271 (85 overs); Zachary McCaskie 92 (197); Imran Khan 4/86 (25 overs)
185 (80 overs); Darren Bravo 36 (79); Chaim Holder 4/63 (27 overs)		118/3 (37.4 overs); Zachary McCaskie 55* (90); Bryan Charles 3/34 (16.4 overs)

Barbados won by 7 wickets
Queen's Park Oval, Trinidad
Umpires: Patrick Gustard and Chris Wright
Player of the match: Zachary McCaskie (Barbados)

- Trinidad and Tobago won the toss and elected to bat.
- Rashawn Worrell (Barbados) made his first-class debut.
- Barbados 18.8, Trinidad and Tobago 3.8.

22–25 March 2023
Scorecard

Guyana	v	Jamaica
278 (88.1 overs); Leon Johnson 150* (254); Marquino Mindley 3/34 (14.1 overs)		115 (35.5 overs); Derval Green 42 (89); Nial Smith 5/39 (7.5 overs)
294/7d (92.4 overs); Tevin Imlach 136* (217); Marquino Mindley 6/54 (16 overs)		229 (66.2 overs); Tevin Gilzene 85 (141); Kevin Sinclair 4/37 (18.2 overs)

Guyana won by 228 runs
Providence Stadium, Guyana
Umpires: Shannon Crawford and Nigel Duguid
Player of the match: Marquino Mindley (Jamaica)

- Jamaica won the toss and elected to field.
- Guyana 19.2, Jamaica 5.8.

22–25 March 2023
Scorecard

Leeward Islands	v	Windward Islands
382/9d (121.5 overs); Kofi James 107 (248); Shermon Lewis 3/76 (21.5 overs)		353 (95 overs); Kavem Hodge 137 (253); Jeremiah Louis 4/46 (21 overs)
144 (55 overs); Montcin Hodge 59 (133); Preston McSween 5/39 (13 overs)		174/4 (38 overs); Sunil Ambris 40* (49); Rahkeem Cornwall 2/53 (13 overs)

Windward Islands won by 6 wickets
Brian Lara Cricket Academy, Trinidad
Umpires: Danesh Ramdhanie and Leslie Reifer
Player of the match: Preston McSween (Windward Islands)

- Leeward Islands won the toss and elected to bat.
- Karima Gore and Javier Spencer (Leeward Islands) both made their first-class debuts.
- Points: Windward Islands 20.2, Leeward Islands 7.2.

=== Round 5 ===
29 March–01 April 2023
Scorecard

Trinidad and Tobago	v	Jamaica
302 (86.5 overs); Terrance Hinds 94 (121); Derval Green 3/56 (15 overs)		125 (29.4 overs); Derval Green 39 (47); Tion Webster 5/36 (9.4 overs)
102/1 (24.3 overs); Vikash Mohan 44 * (66); Jermaine Blackwood 1/16 (3 overs)		275 (70.5 overs) (f/o); Jermaine Blackwood 68 (137); Imran Khan 4/47 (17.5 overs)

Trinidad and Tobago won by 9 wickets.
Brian Lara Cricket Academy, Trinidad
Umpires: Leslie Reifer and Gregory Brathwaite
Player of the match: Terrance Hinds (Trinidad and Tobago)

- Trinidad and Tobago won the toss and elected to bat.
- Brad Barnes, Carlos Brown, Jeavor Royal (Jamaica) and Kamil Pooran (Trinidad and Tobago) all made their first-class debuts.
- Points: Trinidad and Tobago 20.8, Jamaica 4.4.

29 March–01 April 2023
Scorecard

Guyana	v	Leeward Islands
122 (44.1 overs); Matthew Nandu 22 (36); Rahkeem Cornwall 4/27 (17 overs)		247 (92.1 overs); Jahmar Hamilton 58 (131); Nial Smith 4/33 (12.1 overs)
267 (79 overs); Kemol Savory 66* (157); Rahkeem Cornwall 4/58 (22 overs)		125 (45.5 overs); Kieran Powell 61 (105); Kevin Sinclair 6/33 (16.5 overs)

Guyana won by 17 runs.
Providence Stadium, Guyana
Umpires: Nigel Duguid and Ryan Banwarie
Player of the match: Kevin Sinclair (Guyana)

- Guyana won the toss and elected to bat first.
- Larry Audain (Leeward Islands) made his first-class debut.
- Points: Guyana 15.8, Leeward Islands 4.8.

29 March–01 April 2023
Scorecard

Windward Islands	v	Barbados
237 (66.5 overs); Alick Athanaze 59 (113); Akeem Jordan 5/44 (16 overs)		227 (90.4 overs); Shayne Moseley 112 (184); Larry Edward 6/43 (29.4 overs)
225 (73.2 overs); Sunil Ambris 79 (141); Jomel Warrican 4/58 (27.1 overs)		114 (47 overs); Jonathan Drakes 35 (82); Kenneth Dember 5/26 (13 overs)

Windward Islands won by 121 runs.
Queen's Park Oval, Trinidad
Umpires: Danesh Ramdhanie and Zahid Bassarath
Player of the match: Larry Edward (Windward Islands)

- Windward Islands won the toss and elected to bat first.
- Points: Windward Islands 16.2, Barbados 5.6.
