= 2021–22 West Indies Championship =

Cricket tournament

- Dates: 9 February 2022 – 4 June 2022
- Administrator(s): CWI
- Cricket format: First-class (four-day)
- Tournament format(s): round-robin
- Champions: Barbados (22nd title)
- Participants: 6
- Matches: 15
- Most runs: Kraigg Brathwaite (584)
- Most wickets: Rahkeem Cornwall (23)

The 2021–22 West Indies Championship was the 55th edition of the Regional Four Day Competition, the domestic first-class cricket competition for the countries of the Cricket West Indies (CWI), which started on 9 February 2022. Six teams contested the tournament – Barbados, Guyana, Jamaica, the Leeward Islands, Trinidad and Tobago, and the Windward Islands. The series was played for the Headley–Weekes Trophy, named after George Headley and Sir Everton Weekes. Barbados were the defending champions.

The last domestic first-class matches played in the West Indies took place in March 2020, during the 2019–20 West Indies Championship. The final two rounds of that tournament were cancelled due to the COVID-19 pandemic. There was also no tournament in 2020–21 because of the pandemic. The first two rounds of fixtures took place in February 2022, followed by a break for the Test match series between the West Indies and England, with CWI announcing the fixtures for the final three rounds of matches in late March 2022.

On the last day of the fifth and final round of matches, Barbados won the tournament to retain their title.

== Points table ==
Team	Pld	W	L	T	D	Pts	Qualification
Barbados	5	3	1	0	1	76.2	Champions
Leeward Islands	5	3	1	0	1	72.6	
Guyana	5	2	1	0	2	61.8	
Trinidad and Tobago	5	2	2	0	1	54.2	
Jamaica	5	1	2	0	2	43.8	
Windward Islands	5	0	4	0	1	26.8	

== Fixtures ==
=== Round 1 ===
9–12 February 2022
Scorecard

Leeward Islands	v	Barbados
172/9d (53.3 overs); Devon Thomas 58 (77); Keon Harding 4/42 (11.3 overs)		324 (113.2 overs); Shamar Springer 91 (181); Rahkeem Cornwall 4/99 (33 overs)
346 (109.2 overs); Devon Thomas 112 (140); Ramon Simmonds 4/64 (21 overs)		195/6 (54.2 overs); Jonathan Carter 71* (131); Jeremiah Louis 4/50 (14 overs)

Barbados won by 4 wickets
Kensington Oval, Bridgetown
Umpires: Gregory Brathwaite and Jonathan Blades

- Barbados won the toss and elected to field.
- Ramon Simmonds (Barbados) made his first-class debut.

9–12 February 2022
Scorecard

Jamaica	v	Trinidad and Tobago
141 (51.4 overs); Jermaine Blackwood 44 (72); Bryan Charles 6/48 (20.4 overs)		273 (114.3 overs); Yannic Cariah 72 (223); Marquino Mindley 5/70 (28.3 overs)
212 (61.5 overs); John Campbell 45 (66); Anderson Phillip 5/82 (15 overs)		81/7 (34.4 overs); Keagan Simmons 38 (82); Jamie Merchant 3/18 (10.4 overs)

Trinidad and Tobago won by 3 wickets
Brian Lara Cricket Academy, Tarouba
Umpires: Danesh Ramdhanie and Zahid Bassarath

- Jamaica won the toss and elected to bat.
- Leroy Lugg (Jamaica) made his first-class debut.

9–12 February 2022
Scorecard

Windward Islands	v	Guyana
339 (106.2 overs); Preston McSween 86 (103); Gudakesh Motie 4/62 (26.2 overs)		327 (97.3 overs); Vishaul Singh 93 (221); Kenneth Dember 4/36 (14.3 overs)
190 (63.1 overs); Alick Athanaze 58 (63); Veerasammy Permaul 5/53 (24.1 overs)		203/9 (69.3 overs); Chandrapaul Hemraj 60 (72); Kenneth Dember 5/80 (29.3 overs)

Guyana won by 1 wicket
Queen's Park Oval, Port of Spain
Umpires: Joel Wilson and Nigel Duguid

- Windward Islands won the toss and elected to bat.
- Teddy Bishop (Windward Islands) made his first-class debut.

=== Round 2 ===
15–18 February 2022
Scorecard

Jamaica	v	Barbados
328 (95.4 overs); John Campbell 127 (228); Raymon Reifer 6/23 (13.4 overs)		521/8d (149 overs); Kraigg Brathwaite 276 (407); Patrick Harty 5/111 (35 overs)
233 (86 overs); Jermaine Blackwood 61 (132); Jomel Warrican 6/78 (30 overs)		42 (9.4 overs); Shayne Moseley 34* (35)

Barbados won by 10 wickets
Kensington Oval, Bridgetown
Umpires: Gregory Brathwaite and Jonathan Blades

- Jamaica won the toss and elected to bat.
- Kraigg Brathwaite (Barbados) scored his 25th century in first-class cricket.

15–18 February 2022
Scorecard

Guyana	v	Leeward Islands
116 (34.3 overs); Anthony Bramble 38 (39); Daniel Doram 3/16 (6 overs)		438/7d (146 overs); Terrence Warde 78* (168); Nial Smith 3/100 (26 overs)
265 (50.1 overs); Anthony Bramble 58 (70); Alzarri Joseph 5/94 (15 overs)

Leeward Islands won by an innings and 57 runs
Queen's Park Oval, Port of Spain
Umpires: Joel Wilson and Nigel Duguid

- Guyana won the toss and elected to bat.
- Kofi James (Leeward Islands) made his first-class debut.

15–18 February 2022
Scorecard

Trinidad and Tobago	v	Windward Islands
326 (116 overs); Joshua Da Silva 73 (139); Shermon Lewis 5/43 (21 overs)		98 (44 overs); Alick Athanaze 33 (53); Anderson Phillip 4/32 (11 overs)
		186 (63 overs) (f/o); Denis Smith 65 (143); Imran Khan 4/38 (17 overs)

Trinidad and Tobago won by an innings and 43 runs
Brian Lara Cricket Academy, Tarouba
Umpires: Danesh Ramdhanie and Zahid Bassarath

- Windward Islands won the toss and elected to field.

=== Round 3 ===
18–21 May 2022
Scorecard

Guyana	v	Barbados
490/7d (157.4 overs); Tagenarine Chanderpaul 140* (434); Akeem Jordan 3/108 (30 overs)		266 (84.4 overs); Shai Hope 119 (200); Veerasammy Permaul 4/81 (22.4 overs)
71/5 (12 overs); Tagenarine Chanderpaul 23* (10); Akeem Jordan 4/31 (6 overs)		291 (93.5 overs) (f/o); Kraigg Brathwaite 111 (242); Keemo Paul 4/90 (26 overs)

Guyana won by 5 wickets
Queen's Park Oval, Port of Spain
Umpires: Carl Tuckett and Patrick Gustard

- Guyana won the toss and elected to bat.
- Akeem Jordan (Barbados) and Demetri Cameron (Guyana) both made their first-class debuts.
- Gudakesh Motie (Guyana) scored his maiden century in first-class cricket.

18–21 May 2022
Scorecard

Leeward Islands	v	Trinidad and Tobago
357 (95.5 overs); Kieran Powell 139 (210); Jayden Seales 5/49 (16.5 overs)		140 (58 overs); Joshua Da Silva 65 (115); Colin Archibald 4/27 (12 overs)
241/7d (47.1 overs); Devon Thomas 84 (53); Yannic Cariah 3/33 (4 overs)		271 (80.2 overs); Yannic Cariah 100 (180); Rahkeem Cornwall 4/50 (23 overs)

Leeward Islands won by 187 runs
Diego Martin Sporting Complex, Trinidad and Tobago
Umpires: Deighton Butler and Jonathan Blades

- Leeward Islands won the toss and elected to bat.

18–21 May 2022
Scorecard

Windward Islands	v	Jamaica
137 (51.1 overs); Keron Cottoy 50 (109); Marquino Mindley 5/20 (12 overs)		346 (87 overs); Brandon King 119* (154); Preston McSween 4/96 (25 overs)
195 (74.2 overs); Kavem Hodge 63 (147); Derval Green 5/46 (18.2 overs)

Jamaica won by an innings and 14 runs
Brian Lara Cricket Academy, Tarouba
Umpires: Danesh Ramdhanie and Zahid Bassarath

- Ackeem Auguste (Windward Islands) made his first-class debut.
- Jamie Merchant (Jamaica) took his maiden five-wicket haul in first-class cricket.

=== Round 4 ===
25–28 May 2022
Scorecard

Trinidad and Tobago	v	Barbados
133 (54.2 overs); Imran Khan 29 (49); Jomel Warrican 3/21 (8.2 overs)		294 (91.5 overs); Raymon Reifer 79 (161); Terrance Hinds 5/32 (14.5 overs)
139 (53.2 overs); Yannic Cariah 35* (87); Roston Chase 3/26 (12 overs)

Barbados won by an innings and 22 runs
Brian Lara Cricket Academy, Tarouba
Umpires: Danesh Ramdhanie and Zahid Bassarath

- Trinidad and Tobago won the toss and elected to bat.
- Terrance Hinds (Trinidad and Tobago) took his maiden five-wicket haul in first-class cricket.

25–28 May 2022
Scorecard

Leeward Islands	v	Windward Islands
333 (95.5 overs); Colin Archibald 106* (109); Preston McSween 5/92 (27.5 overs)		173 (55 overs); Keron Cottoy 73* (97); Rahkeem Cornwall 5/61 (22 overs)
252/8d (60.5 overs); Devon Thomas 51 (45); Kenneth Dember 3/62 (19 overs)		184 (69.3 overs); Kimani Melius 51 (58); Rahkeem Cornwall 6/45 (28 overs)

Leeward Islands won by 228 runs
Queen's Park Oval, Port of Spain
Umpires: Jonathan Blades and Patrick Gustard

- Leeward Islands won the toss and elected to bat.
- Darius Martin (Windward Islands) made his first-class debut.
- Colin Archibald (Leeward Islands) scored his maiden century in first-class cricket.

25–28 May 2022
Scorecard

Jamaica	v	Guyana
393 (109.3 overs); Jermaine Blackwood 114 (261); Veerasammy Permaul 3/96 (36.3 overs)		584/7d (157 overs); Tagenarine Chanderpaul 184 (425); Nicholson Gordon 4/122 (25 overs)
271/6 (80 overs); John Campbell 98 (155); Veerasammy Permaul 3/61 (28 overs)

Match drawn
Diego Martin Sporting Complex, Trinidad and Tobago
Umpires: Carl Tuckett and Deighton Butler
Player of the match: Tagenarine Chanderpaul (Guyana)

- Jamaica won the toss and elected to bat.
- Aldane Thomas (Jamaica) scored his maiden century in first-class cricket.

=== Round 5 ===
1–4 June 2022
Scorecard

Windward Islands	v	Barbados
203 (62 overs); Teddy Bishop 44 (61); Ramon Simmonds 3/25 (10 overs)		285/6 (80 overs); Kraigg Brathwaite 109 (219); Larry Edwards 2/27 (14 overs)

Match drawn
Diego Martin Sporting Complex, Trinidad and Tobago
Umpires: Carl Tuckett and Patrick Gustard

- Windward Islands won the toss and elected to bat.
- No play was possible on days 2 and 3 due to rain.

1–4 June 2022
Scorecard

Trinidad and Tobago	v	Guyana
218 (94.2 overs); Jeremy Solozano 72 (252); Keemo Paul 6/50 (19.2 overs)		331 (83.3 overs); Tevin Imlach 76 (173); Bryan Charles 3/56 (18 overs)
25/1 (11 overs); Keagan Simmons 13* (38); Keemo Paul 1/10 (5 overs)

Match drawn
Queen's Park Oval, Port of Spain
Umpires: Deighton Butler and Jonathan Blades

- Trinidad and Tobago won the toss and elected to bat.
- No play was possible on day 2 due to rain.
- Only 20.4 overs were bowled on day 3 due to rain.

1–4 June 2022
Scorecard

Jamaica	v	Leeward Islands
302 (80 overs); Paul Palmer 144* (233); Sheeno Berridge 2/29 (12 overs)		4/0 (3 overs); Montcin Hodge 2* (9)

Match drawn
Brian Lara Cricket Academy, Tarouba
Umpires: Danesh Ramdhanie and Zahid Bassarath

- Leeward Islands won the toss and elected to field.
- No play was possible on days 2 and 4 due to rain.
- Only 3 overs were bowled on day 3 due to rain.
- Kirk McKenzie (Jamaica) made his first-class debut.
