= 2019–20 West Indies Championship =

Cricket tournament

- Dates: 9 January – 5 April 2020
- Administrator: CWI
- Cricket format: First-class (four-day)
- Tournament format: Double round-robin
- Champions: Barbados (21st title)
- Participants: 6
- Matches: 30
- Most runs: Jermaine Blackwood (768)
- Most wickets: Veerasammy Permaul (50)

The 2019–20 West Indies Championship was the 54th edition of the Regional Four Day Competition, the domestic first-class cricket competition for the countries of the Cricket West Indies (CWI). The previous edition of the tournament was known as the Regional Four Day Competition before being rebranded by CWI. The competition started on 9 January 2020 and was scheduled to conclude on 5 April 2020. Six teams contested the tournament – Barbados, Guyana, Jamaica, the Leeward Islands, Trinidad and Tobago, and the Windward Islands. Guyana were the defending champions.

On 13 March 2020, Cricket West Indies suspended the tournament, for a minimum of 30 days, due to the COVID-19 pandemic. On 24 March 2020, Cricket West Indies cancelled the final two rounds of fixtures, and named Barbados as the tournament winners, after they finished top of the group.

== Points table ==
Team	Pld	W	L	D	T	Pts
Barbados	8	6	2	0	0	134.8
Trinidad and Tobago	8	3	2	3	0	94.6
Jamaica	8	3	3	2	0	91.8
Guyana	8	3	3	2	0	91.8
Windward Islands	8	2	3	3	0	78.0
Leeward Islands	8	1	5	2	0	52.8

Champions

== Fixtures ==
=== Round 1 ===
9–12 January 2020
Scorecard

Guyana	v	Leeward Islands
388 (132.2 overs); Christopher Barnwell 82 (106); Damion Jacobs 4/89 (29 overs)		154 (47.2 overs); Jahmar Hamilton 52 (49); Nial Smith 6/55 (16 overs)
24/0 (3.4 overs); Tagenarine Chanderpaul 14* (11)		254 (92 overs) (f/o); Kieran Powell 99 (131); Raymon Reifer 3/55 (15 overs)

Guyana won by 10 wickets
Sir Vivian Richards Stadium, Antigua
Umpires: Verdayne Smith and Carl Tuckett
Player of the match: Nial Smith (Guyana)

- Guyana won the toss and elected to bat.
- Colin Archibald (Leeward Islands) and Nial Smith (Guyana) both made their first-class debuts.

9–12 January 2020
Scorecard

Trinidad and Tobago	v	Jamaica
460/4d (151 overs); Joshua Da Silva 113* (211); Derval Green 2/97 (30 overs)		278 (84 overs); Rovman Powell 71 (91); Akeal Hosein 4/58 (25 overs)
		300/8 (106 overs) (f/o); Paul Palmer 116* (216); Akeal Hosein 3/65 (35 overs)

Match drawn
Brian Lara Cricket Academy, Tarouba
Umpires: Shannon Crawford and Danesh Ramdhanie
Player of the match: Paul Palmer (Jamaica)

- Trinidad and Tobago won the toss and elected to bat.
- Keagan Simmons, Terrance Hinds (Trinidad and Tobago) and Patrick Harty (Jamaica) all made their first-class debuts.
- Joshua Da Silva (Trinidad and Tobago) scored his maiden century in first-class cricket.

9–12 January 2020
Scorecard

Barbados	v	Windward Islands
233 (75.5 overs); Kyle Mayers 106 (121); Keron Cottoy 3/41 (10.5 overs)		234 (103.1 overs); Emmanuel Stewart 50 (175); Jomel Warrican 4/40 (27 overs)
269 (85.3 overs); Kraigg Brathwaite 72 (133); Shane Shillingford 7/105 (31.3 overs)		269/7 (88.4 overs); Desron Maloney 83 (197); Jomel Warrican 3/68 (31 overs)

Windward Islands won by 3 wickets
Arnos Vale Ground, Kingstown
Umpires: Deighton Butler and Zahid Bassarath
Player of the match: Shane Shillingford (Windward Islands)

- Windward Islands won the toss and elected to field.
- Desron Maloney (Windward Islands) made his first-class debut.
- Kyle Mayers (Barbados) scored his maiden century in first-class cricket.

=== Round 2 ===
16–19 January 2020
Scorecard

Windward Islands	v	Jamaica
387 (113.3 overs); Kavem Hodge 88 (171); Patrick Harty 3/65 (19.3 overs)		220 (69.2 overs); Derval Green 62 (88); Preston McSween 3/41 (15.2 overs)
155/5 (39.3 overs); Devon Smith 47 (64); Derval Green 3/30 (12 overs)		404/8d (119.1 overs) (f/o); John Campbell 101 (157); Shermon Lewis 3/62 (19 overs)

Match drawn
Sabina Park, Kingston
Umpires: Chris Wright and Carl Tuckett
Player of the match: Derval Green (Jamaica)

- Jamaica won the toss and elected to field.

16–19 January 2020
Scorecard

Guyana	v	Barbados
209 (89.1 overs); Tagenarine Chanderpaul 66* (280); Kemar Roach 4/28 (19 overs)		389 (122.2 overs); Kyle Mayers 75 (100); Keon Joseph 4/75 (22.2 overs)
258 (74.1 overs); Vishaul Singh 79 (168); Keon Harding 4/77 (16 overs)		79/3 (16.4 overs); Shamarh Brooks 44* (54); Veerasammy Permaul 2/11 (4 overs)

Barbados won by 7 wickets
Kensington Oval, Bridgetown
Umpires: Christopher Taylor and Danesh Ramdhanie
Player of the match: Jonathan Carter (Barbados)

- Barbados won the toss and elected to field.
- Kevin Sinclair (Guyana) made his first-class debut.

16–19 January 2020
Scorecard

Leeward Islands	v	Trinidad and Tobago
186 (49 overs); Jahmar Hamilton 55 (78); Odean Smith 4/51 (12 overs)		552/9d (140.4 overs); Darren Bravo 133 (227); Sheeno Berridge 3/94 (28 overs)
198 (64.4 overs); Alzarri Joseph 47* (54); Akeal Hosein 6/62 (25.4 overs)

Trinidad and Tobago won by an innings and 168 runs
Brian Lara Cricket Academy, Tarouba
Umpires: Verdayne Smith and Zahid Bassarath
Player of the match: Akeal Hosein (Trinidad and Tobago)

- Leeward Islands won the toss and elected to bat.
- Kissoondath Magram (Trinidad and Tobago) made his first-class debut.
- Terrance Hinds (Trinidad and Tobago) scored his maiden century in first-class cricket.

=== Round 3 ===
23–26 January 2020
Scorecard

Guyana	v	Trinidad and Tobago
323 (111.3 overs); Anthony Bramble 91 (77); Bryan Charles 5/87 (27 overs)		98 (41 overs); Jeremy Solozano 27 (80); Nial Smith 5/12 (8 overs)
177/5d (64 overs); Chandrapaul Hemraj 54 (92); Yannick Ottley 2/8 (5 overs)		183 (61.2 overs); Jeremy Solozano 34 (72); Veerasammy Permaul 4/42 (18.2 overs)

Guyana won by 219 runs
Guyana National Stadium, Guyana
Umpires: Shannon Crawford and Carl Tuckett
Player of the match: Veerasammy Permaul (Guyana)

- Guyana won the toss and elected to bat.

23–26 January 2020
Scorecard

Barbados	v	Jamaica
219 (66.5 overs); Shayne Moseley 64 (127); Marquino Mindley 4/31 (13 overs)		138 (44.3 overs); Denis Smith 35 (96); Chemar Holder 5/45 (16 overs)
206 (65 overs); Shane Dowrich 73 (118); Nicholson Gordon 6/45 (15 overs)		168 (47.3 overs); Nkrumah Bonner 39* (103); Chemar Holder 6/47 (14.3 overs)

Barbados won by 119 runs
Sabina Park, Kingston
Umpires: Christopher Taylor and Zahid Bassarath
Player of the match: Chemar Holder (Barbados)

- Jamaica won the toss and elected to field.

23–26 January 2020
Scorecard

Windward Islands	v	Leeward Islands
138 (68.4 overs); Devon Smith 49 (194); Alzarri Joseph 5/41 (23.4 overs)		354/8d (88.2 overs); Kieran Powell 69 (119); Shermon Lewis 3/80 (18 overs)
51 (33 overs); Emmanuel Stewart 11 (29); Sheeno Berridge 5/22 (10 overs)

Leeward Islands won by an innings and 165 runs
Daren Sammy Cricket Ground, Gros Islet
Umpires: Chris Wright and Deighton Butler
Player of the match: Alzarri Joseph (Leeward Islands)

- Leeward Islands won the toss and elected to field.
- No play was possible on day 1.

=== Round 4 ===
6–9 February 2020
Scorecard

Guyana	v	Jamaica
187 (79.5 overs); Jermaine Blackwood 81 (185); Veerasammy Permaul 4/39 (22.5 overs)		190 (83.1 overs); Chandrapaul Hemraj 38 (67); Patrick Harty 3/30 (14 overs)
184 (62 overs); Nkrumah Bonner 57* (123); Veerasammy Permaul 6/50 (26 overs)		174 (59.4 overs); Anthony Bramble 32 (31); Pete Salmon 7/57 (25 overs)

Jamaica won by 7 runs
Guyana National Stadium, Guyana
Umpires: Deighton Butler and Zahid Bassarath
Player of the match: Pete Salmon (Jamaica)

- Jamaica won the toss and elected to bat.
- Pete Salmon (Jamaica) made his first-class debut and took his first five-wicket haul.

6–9 February 2020
Scorecard

Trinidad and Tobago	v	Windward Islands
373/9d (113.5 overs); Jason Mohammed 119 (215); Shane Shillingford 3/63 (22 overs)		293/8 (107.4 overs); Andre Fletcher 88 (218); Akeal Hosein 4/61 (35 overs)

Match drawn
Windsor Park, Roseau
Umpires: Christopher Taylor and Jonathan Blades
Player of the match: Jason Mohammed (Trinidad and Tobago)

- Windward Islands won the toss and elected to field.
- No play was possible on day 3.
- Yannick Ottley (Trinidad and Tobago) scored his maiden century in first-class cricket.
- Jason Mohammed (Trinidad and Tobago) scored his tenth century in first-class cricket.

7–10 February 2020
Scorecard

Leeward Islands	v	Barbados
181 (54 overs); Kieran Powell 76 (143); Camarie Boyce 5/65 (16 overs)		398 (119.4 overs); Shamarh Brooks 116 (189); Rahkeem Cornwall 4/104 (37 overs)
136 (46.3 overs); Colin Archibald 53 (32); Chemar Holder 3/33 (10 overs)

Barbados won by an innings and 81 runs
Warner Park, Basseterre
Umpires: Patrick Gustard and Lyndon Rajkumar
Player of the match: Camarie Boyce (Barbados)

- Barbados won the toss and elected to field.
- The start of the match was moved back by a day, following a break-in at the ground.
- Camarie Boyce (Barbados) made his first-class debut, and took a five-wicket haul in the first innings.

=== Round 5 ===
13–16 February 2020
Scorecard

Leeward Islands	v	Jamaica
227 (99.4 overs); Terrence Warde 65* (174); Patrick Harty 4/43 (26 overs)		385 (112.4 overs); Jermaine Blackwood 98 (154); Rahkeem Cornwall 4/130 (44 overs)
294 (114.4 overs); Terrence Warde 74 (179); Nicholson Gordon 5/97 (24 overs)		137/5 (17.4 overs); Nkrumah Bonner 66* (47); Rahkeem Cornwall 3/58 (9 overs)

Jamaica won by 5 wickets
Trelawny Stadium, Jamaica
Umpires: Verdayne Smith and Deighton Butler
Player of the match: Nicholson Gordon (Jamaica)

- Leeward Islands won the toss and elected to bat.
- Nino Henry (Leeward Islands) made his first-class debut.

13–16 February 2020
Scorecard

Barbados	v	Trinidad and Tobago
209 (60 overs); Kevin Stoute 52 (85); Uthman Muhammad 3/47 (11 overs)		175 (56.3 overs); Jeremy Solozano 50 (84); Keon Harding 5/57 (17.3 overs)
342/5d (103.3 overs); Shayne Moseley 155* (314); Akeal Hosein 2/66 (22 overs)		77 (32.2 overs); Joshua Da Silva 23 (43); Keon Harding 5/19 (10.2 overs)

Barbados won by 299 runs
Kensington Oval, Bridgetown
Umpires: Patrick Gustard and Jonathan Blades
Player of the match: Shayne Moseley (Barbados)

- Trinidad and Tobago won the toss and elected to field.

13–16 February 2020
Scorecard

Windward Islands	v	Guyana
318 (108.5 overs); Keron Cottoy 56 (85); Veerasammy Permaul 4/59 (33.5 overs)		426 (118.5 overs); Leon Johnson 189* (357); Preston McSween 5/102 (27 overs)
273/1 (82 overs); Devon Smith 147* (261); Raymon Reifer 1/50 (13 overs)

Match drawn
Grenada National Stadium, Grenada
Umpires: Chris Wright and Zahid Bassarath
Player of the match: Leon Johnson (Guyana)

- Guyana won the toss and elected to field.
- Leon Johnson (Guyana) scored his 6,000 run in first-class cricket.
- Preston McSween (Windward Islands) took his first five-wicket haul in first-class cricket.

=== Round 6 ===
27 February–1 March 2020
Scorecard

Barbados	v	Windward Islands
417 (98.4 overs); Kyle Mayers 140 (161); Josh Thomas 3/83 (17 overs)		258 (62.3 overs); Kavem Hodge 53 (62); Chemar Holder 5/73 (16 overs)
239/4d (56 overs); Kyle Mayers 62* (43); Kavem Hodge 2/44 (12 overs)		271 (67 overs); Keron Cottoy 103* (114); Kemar Roach 6/84 (19 overs)

Barbados won by 127 runs
Kensington Oval, Bridgetown
Umpires: Jonathan Blades and Ryan Banwarie
Player of the match: Kyle Mayers (Barbados)

- Windward Islands won the toss and elected to field.
- Ryan John (Windward Islands) made his first-class debut.
- Keron Cottoy (Windward Islands) scored his maiden century in first-class cricket.

27 February–1 March 2020
Scorecard

Trinidad and Tobago	v	Leeward Islands
287 (102.4 overs); Terrance Hinds 89* (111); Jeremiah Louis 3/62 (24 overs)		251 (115 overs); Amir Jangoo 90 (238); Imran Khan 4/67 (32 overs)
155 (69.3 overs); Joshua Da Silva 79* (168); Rahkeem Cornwall 8/51 (29.3 overs)		183/9 (66 overs); Rahkeem Cornwall 48 (44); Akeal Hosein 4/40 (23 overs)

Match drawn
Warner Park, Basseterre
Umpires: Nigel Duguid and Verdayne Smith
Player of the match: Rahkeem Cornwall (Leeward Islands)

- Leeward Islands won the toss and elected to field.

27 February–1 March 2020
Scorecard

Jamaica	v	Guyana
216 (80.4 overs); Jermaine Blackwood 59 (134); Veerasammy Permaul 7/59 (30.4 overs)		304 (103.2 overs); Vishaul Singh 93 (173); Marquino Mindley 3/68 (23.2 overs)
111 (40.4 overs); John Campbell 66 (77); Veerasammy Permaul 8/18 (11.4 overs)		24/3 (8.4 overs); Kevin Sinclair 9 (15); Jamie Merchant 3/8 (4.4 overs)

Guyana won by 7 wickets
Trelawny Stadium, Jamaica
Umpires: Leslie Reifer and Chris Wright
Player of the match: Veerasammy Permaul (Guyana)

- Guyana won the toss and elected to field.
- Veerasammy Permaul (Guyana) took the second-best match figures in a domestic first-class match in the West Indies since 1966.

=== Round 7 ===
5–8 March 2020
Scorecard

Guyana	v	Leeward Islands
261 (107.5 overs); Vishaul Singh 90 (231); Jeremiah Louis 4/49 (24 overs)		378 (149 overs); Montcin Hodge 98 (371); Veerasammy Permaul 4/102 (45 overs)
228/8d (76 overs); Anthony Bramble 69 (105); Keacy Carty 3/30 (12 overs)		33/1 (12 overs); Kieran Powell 12* (30); Nial Smith 1/12 (6 overs)

Match drawn
Guyana National Stadium, Guyana
Umpires: Nigel Duguid and Christopher Taylor
Player of the match: Rahkeem Cornwall (Leeward Islands)

- Guyana won the toss and elected to bat.
- Ross Powell (Leeward Islands) made his first-class debut.

5–8 March 2020
Scorecard

Trinidad and Tobago	v	Barbados
239 (86.4 overs); Joshua Da Silva 77 (172); Chemar Holder 4/68 (23.4 overs)		260 (67.2 overs); Shane Dowrich 96 (157); Anderson Phillip 6/59 (18.2 overs)
350 (95.1 overs); Jason Mohammed 115* (224); Ashley Nurse 4/72 (24 overs)		182 (49.2 overs); Kyle Mayers 40 (45); Uthman Muhammad 4/28 (8.2 overs)

Trinidad and Tobago won by 147 runs
Brian Lara Cricket Academy, Tarouba
Umpires: Danesh Ramdhanie and Carl Tuckett
Player of the match: Anderson Phillip (Trinidad and Tobago)

- Trinidad and Tobago won the toss and elected to bat.
- Cephas Cooper (Trinidad and Tobago) made his first-class debut.

5–8 March 2020
Scorecard

Jamaica	v	Windward Islands
381 (127.2 overs); Nkrumah Bonner 135 (244); Preston McSween 6/64 (25 overs)		217 (84.2 overs); Devon Smith 72 (173); Marquino Mindley 4/48 (18 overs)
60 (24 overs); Jamie Merchant 19 (20); Ryan John 4/26 (10 overs)		225/8 (71.5 overs); Andre Fletcher 71 (141); Jamie Merchant 2/39 (18 overs)

Windward Islands won by 2 wickets
National Cricket Stadium, Grenada
Umpires: Leslie Reifer and Jonathan Blades
Player of the match: Preston McSween (Windward Islands)

- Jamaica won the toss and elected to bat.

=== Round 8 ===
12–15 March 2020
Scorecard

Leeward Islands	v	Jamaica
260 (72.2 overs); Alzarri Joseph 89 (92); Marquino Mindley 5/65 (22 overs)		561/9d (132.1 overs); Jermaine Blackwood 248 (332); Alzarri Joseph 3/130 (35.1)
183 (67.1 overs); Montcin Hodge 61 (183); Derval Green 5/75 (22.1 overs)

Jamaica won by an innings and 118 runs
Sir Vivian Richards Stadium, Antigua
Umpires: Leslie Reifer and Danesh Ramdhanie
Player of the match: Jermaine Blackwood (Jamaica)

- Jamaica won the toss and elected to field.
- Jermaine Blackwood (Jamaica) scored his maiden double century in first-class cricket.

12–15 March 2020
Scorecard

Trinidad and Tobago	v	Windward Islands
409 (109.1 overs); Jyd Goolie 128 (206); Preston McSween 5/60 (25 overs)		173 (51.2 overs); Devon Smith 67 (117); Anderson Phillip 4/53 (13.2 overs)
		152 (43.2 overs) (f/o); Keron Cottoy 35 (68); Anderson Phillip 6/19 (9.2 overs)

Trinidad and Tobago won by an innings and 84 runs
Brian Lara Cricket Academy, Tarouba
Umpires: Patrick Gustard and Lyndon Rajkumar
Player of the match: Anderson Phillip (Trinidad and Tobago)

- Trinidad and Tobago won the toss and elected to bat.
- Jyd Goolie (Trinidad and Tobago) scored his maiden century in first-class cricket.

12–15 March 2020
Scorecard

Barbados	v	Guyana
174 (74.1 overs); Kraigg Brathwaite 48 (171); Keemo Paul 3/62 (17 overs)		55 (28.1 overs); Shimron Hetmyer 14 (55); Kemar Roach 5/20 (13.1 overs)
210 (66.3 overs); Kraigg Brathwaite 84 (180); Keemo Paul 4/52 (12.3 overs)		94 (24 overs); Keemo Paul 36 (22); Kemar Roach 4/36 (9 overs)

Barbados won by 235 runs
Guyana National Stadium, Guyana
Umpires: Nigel Duguid and Deighton Butler
Player of the match: Kemar Roach (Barbados)

- Barbados won the toss and elected to bat.

=== Round 9 ===
26–29 March 2020
Scorecard

Leeward Islands	v	Windward Islands

Match cancelled without a ball bowled

26–29 March 2020
Scorecard

Trinidad and Tobago	v	Guyana

Match cancelled without a ball bowled

26–29 March 2020
Scorecard

Barbados	v	Jamaica

Match cancelled without a ball bowled

=== Round 10 ===
2–5 April 2020
Scorecard

Guyana	v	Windward Islands

Match cancelled without a ball bowled

2–5 April 2020
Scorecard

Barbados	v	Leeward Islands

Match cancelled without a ball bowled

2–5 April 2020
Scorecard

Jamaica	v	Trinidad and Tobago

Match cancelled without a ball bowled
