= West Indian cricket team in New Zealand in 2020–21 =

International cricket tour

| | New Zealand | West Indies |
- Dates: 27 November – 15 December 2020
| Captains | Kane Williamson (Tests) (Note: Tom Latham captained New Zealand for the second Test.); Tim Southee (T20Is) (Note: Mitchell Santner captained New Zealand for the third T20I.) | Jason Holder (Tests); Kieron Pollard (T20Is) |

Test series
- Result: New Zealand won the 2-match series 2–0
| Most runs | Kane Williamson (251) | Jermaine Blackwood (216) |
| Most wickets | Tim Southee (12) | Shannon Gabriel (6) |
- Player of the series: Kyle Jamieson (NZ)

Twenty20 International series
- Results: New Zealand won the 3-match series 2–0
| Most runs | Glenn Phillips (130) | Kieron Pollard (103) |
| Most wickets | Lockie Ferguson (7) | Oshane Thomas (3) |
- Player of the series: Lockie Ferguson (NZ)

The West Indies cricket team toured New Zealand in November and December 2020 to play two Tests and three Twenty20 International (T20I) matches. The Test series formed part of the inaugural 2019–2021 ICC World Test Championship. In August 2020, New Zealand Cricket had confirmed that the tour was going ahead, and were working with their government to comply with biosecurity during the COVID-19 pandemic. On 29 September 2020, New Zealand Cricket confirmed the schedule for the tour.

It was the first live home cricket coverage for the New Zealand broadcaster Spark Sport, after they won the New Zealand Cricket broadcast rights against the previous broadcasters Sky Sport.

New Zealand won the first two T20I matches to take an unassailable lead in the series. The third and final match was abandoned after 2.2 overs of play due to rain, with New Zealand winning the series 2–0. New Zealand won the first Test match by an innings and 134 runs, with their captain Kane Williamson scoring 251 runs in the first innings. New Zealand also won the second Test match to take the series 2–0, and extend their unbeaten run at home in Test cricket to fifteen matches.

== Squads ==
| Tests | | T20Is | |
| New Zealand | West Indies | New Zealand | West Indies |
|---|---|---|---|
| Kane Williamson (c); Tom Blundell (wk); Trent Boult; Devon Conway; ~~Colin de Grandhomme~~; Kyle Jamieson; Daryl Mitchell; Tom Latham; Henry Nicholls; Ajaz Patel; Mitchell Santner; Tim Southee; Ross Taylor; Neil Wagner; BJ Watling (wk); Will Young | Jason Holder (c); Roston Chase (vc); Jermaine Blackwood; Kraigg Brathwaite; Darren Bravo; Shamarh Brooks; John Campbell; Rahkeem Cornwall; Joshua Da Silva (wk); Shane Dowrich (wk); Shannon Gabriel; Shimron Hetmyer; Chemar Holder; Alzarri Joseph; Keemo Paul; Kemar Roach | Tim Southee (c); Hamish Bennett; Doug Bracewell; Mark Chapman; Devon Conway; Lockie Ferguson; Martin Guptill; Kyle Jamieson; Scott Kuggeleijn; Daryl Mitchell; James Neesham; Glenn Phillips; Mitchell Santner; Tim Seifert (wk); Ish Sodhi; Ross Taylor | Kieron Pollard (c); Nicholas Pooran (vc, wk); Fabian Allen; ~~Dwayne Bravo~~; Sheldon Cottrell; Andre Fletcher; Shimron Hetmyer; Brandon King; Kyle Mayers; Rovman Powell; Keemo Paul; Romario Shepherd; Oshane Thomas; Hayden Walsh Jr.; Kesrick Williams |

Nkrumah Bonner, Joshua Da Silva, Preston McSween, Shayne Moseley, Raymon Reifer and Jayden Seales were also named as reserves for the West Indies' Test squad. On 17 October 2020, Dwayne Bravo suffered an injury during the 2020 Indian Premier League, and was ruled out of the West Indies' squad. Romario Shepherd was named as Bravo's replacement. On 28 October 2020, the squad departed from Barbados for the tour. The squad arrived in New Zealand on 30 October 2020, after a 54-hour journey. In November 2020, Roston Chase was named as the vice-captain of the West Indies' Test side, with Nicholas Pooran retaining his vice-captaincy role for the T20I matches.

Tim Southee was named the captain of New Zealand's T20I squad for the first two matches. Southee, along with Kyle Jamieson and Ross Taylor were not included for the third T20I match to prepare for the Test series, with Doug Bracewell, Mark Chapman and Scott Kuggeleijn added to New Zealand's squad for the third T20I.

On 25 November 2020, Colin de Grandhomme was ruled out of the Test series due to an injury, with Daryl Mitchell named as Grandhomme's replacement. Mitchell Santner was added to New Zealand's squad for the first Test, as cover for Ajaz Patel. Santner was also named as captain of New Zealand's squad for the third T20I, taking over from Tim Southee who was rested for the Test series. Ahead of the Test series, Devon Conway was added to New Zealand's squad, covering for BJ Watling who suffered a hamstring injury. Watling was later ruled out of the first Test due to his injury, with Tom Blundell named as the team's wicket-keeper for the match.

Ahead of the second Test match, Shane Dowrich and Kemar Roach both left the West Indies' squad for personal reasons. Joshua Da Silva was added to the squad, as a replacement wicket-keeper for Dowrich. On 10 December 2020, it was announced that Kane Williamson would miss the second Test, due to the birth of his first child, with Tom Latham named as captain of the New Zealand team.

== Practice matches ==
The West Indies played two practice matches against the New Zealand A team in November in Queenstown. The West Indies A team also played two matches against the New Zealand A team in December 2020; one in Mount Maunganui, and the other match in Nelson. Both fixtures were unofficial Test matches, with first-class status.

20–22 November 2020
Scorecard

| New Zealand A | v | West Indies |
| 308/3d (79 overs); Rachin Ravindra 112 (187); Raymon Reifer 1/29 (7 overs) | | 366 (116 overs); Darren Bravo 135 (214); Jacob Duffy 3/49 (19 overs) |
| 124/1 (45.2 overs); Will Young 64* (147); Shannon Gabriel 1/23 (9 overs) |

Match drawn
John Davies Oval, Queenstown
Umpires: Chris Brown (NZ) and Wayne Knights (NZ)

- New Zealand A won the toss and elected to bat.

26–29 November 2020
Scorecard

| West Indies | v | New Zealand A |
| 571 (162.1 overs); Kraigg Brathwaite 246 (400); Cole McConchie 3/130 (36.1 overs) | | 440/8d (149 overs); Will Young 133 (270); Chemar Holder 3/100 (28 overs) |

Match drawn
John Davies Oval, Queenstown
Umpires: Billy Bowden (NZ) and Derek Walker (NZ)

- West Indies won the toss and elected to bat.

3–6 December 2020
Scorecard

| West Indies A (Cricket West Indies) | v | New Zealand A |
| 322 (82.1 overs); Romario Shepherd 133 (154); Jacob Duffy 4/47 (18.1 overs) | | 574 (152.5 overs); Glenn Phillips 136 (184); Hayden Walsh Jr. 3/108 (24 over) |
| 109 (36 overs); Nicholas Pooran 35 (61); Scott Kuggeleijn 3/18 (8 overs) |

New Zealand A won by an innings and 143 runs
Bay Oval, Mount Maunganui
Umpires: John Dempsey (NZ) and Tim Parlane (NZ)

- New Zealand A won the toss and elected to field.

11–14 December 2020
Scorecard

| New Zealand A | v | (Cricket West Indies) West Indies A |
| 481/7d (134.3 overs); Rachin Ravindra 144* (174); Rahkeem Cornwall 3/91 (37.5 overs) | | 298 (88.3 overs); Shayne Moseley 110 (267); Doug Bracewell 6/42 (15 overs) |
| 174/7d (27.5 overs); Mark Chapman 40 (45); Rahkeem Cornwall 3/37 (10 overs) | | 256 (69.3 overs); Nicholas Pooran 69 (63); Rachin Ravindra 6/89 (19.3 overs) |

New Zealand A won by 101 runs
Saxton Oval, Nelson
Umpires: John Dempsey (NZ) and Garth Stirrat (NZ)

- New Zealand A won the toss and elected to bat.
- Jayden Seales (West Indies A) made his first-class debut.

== T20I series ==
=== 1st T20I ===
27 November 2020
19:00 (N)
Scorecard

| West Indies; 180/7 (16 overs) | v | New Zealand; 179/5 (15.2 overs) |
| Kieron Pollard 75* (37); Lockie Ferguson 5/21 (4 overs) | | James Neesham 48* (24); Oshane Thomas 2/23 (3 overs) |

New Zealand won by 5 wickets (DLS method)
Eden Park, Auckland
Umpires: Chris Brown (NZ) and Wayne Knights (NZ)
Player of the match: Lockie Ferguson (NZ)

- New Zealand won the toss and elected to field.
- New Zealand were set a revised target of 176 runs from 16 overs due to rain.
- Devon Conway and Kyle Jamieson (NZ) both made their T20I debuts.
- Lockie Ferguson (NZ) took his first five-wicket haul in T20Is.

=== 2nd T20I ===
29 November 2020
14:00
Scorecard

| New Zealand; 238/3 (20 overs) | v | West Indies; 166/9 (20 overs) |
| Glenn Phillips 108 (51); Kieron Pollard 1/33 (3 overs) | | Kieron Pollard 28 (15); Kyle Jamieson 2/15 (4 overs) |

New Zealand won by 72 runs
Bay Oval, Mount Maunganui
Umpires: Chris Brown (NZ) and Shaun Haig (NZ)
Player of the match: Glenn Phillips (NZ)

- West Indies won the toss and elected to field.
- Kyle Mayers (WI) made his T20I debut.
- Glenn Phillips (NZ) scored his first century in T20Is.
- Glenn Phillips also scored the fastest century by a New Zealand batsman in T20Is (46 balls).

=== 3rd T20I ===
30 November 2020
19:00 (N)
Scorecard

| West Indies; 25/1 (2.2 overs) | v | New Zealand |
| Brandon King 11 (7); Lockie Ferguson 1/13 (1 over) |

No result
Bay Oval, Mount Maunganui
Umpires: Shaun Haig (NZ) and Wayne Knights (NZ)

- New Zealand won the toss and elected to field.
- Rain during the West Indies' innings prevented any further play.
- Mitchell Santner captained New Zealand for the first time in T20Is.

== Test series ==
=== 1st Test ===
3–7 December 2020 (Note: While five days of play were scheduled for each Test, both Tests reached a result in four days.)
Scorecard

| New Zealand | v | West Indies |
| 519/7d (145 overs); Kane Williamson 251 (412); Shannon Gabriel 3/89 (25 overs) | | 138 (64 overs); John Campbell 26 (73); Tim Southee 4/35 (19 overs) |
| | | 247 (58.5 overs) (f/o); Jermaine Blackwood 104 (141); Neil Wagner 4/66 (13.5 overs) |

New Zealand won by an innings and 134 runs
Seddon Park, Hamilton
Umpires: Chris Gaffaney (NZ) and Wayne Knights (NZ)
Player of the match: Kane Williamson (NZ)

- West Indies won the toss and elected to field.
- No play was possible before lunch on day 1 due to rain.
- Will Young (NZ) made his Test debut.
- In terms of an innings victory, this was New Zealand's biggest win against the West Indies in Tests.
- World Test Championship points: New Zealand 60, West Indies 0.

=== 2nd Test ===
11–15 December 2020
Scorecard

| New Zealand | v | West Indies |
| 460 (114 overs); Henry Nicholls 174 (280); Shannon Gabriel 3/93 (26 overs) | | 131 (56.4 overs); Jermaine Blackwood 69 (92); Tim Southee 5/32 (17.4 overs) |
| | | 317 (79.1 overs) (f/o); John Campbell 68 (109); Neil Wagner 3/54 (17.1 overs) |

New Zealand won by an innings and 12 runs
Basin Reserve, Wellington
Umpires: Chris Brown (NZ) and Chris Gaffaney (NZ)
Player of the match: Henry Nicholls (NZ)

- West Indies won the toss and elected to field.
- Joshua Da Silva and Chemar Holder (WI) both made their Test debuts.
- Neil Wagner (NZ) and Shannon Gabriel (WI) both played in their 50th Test.
- World Test Championship points: New Zealand 60, West Indies 0.
