= English cricket team in the West Indies in 2021–22 =

International cricket tour

	West Indies	England
- Dates: 22 January – 28 March 2022
Captains	Kraigg Brathwaite (Tests); Kieron Pollard (T20Is)	Joe Root (Tests) Eoin Morgan (Note: Moeen Ali captained England for the third, fourth and fifth T20Is.) (T20Is)

Test series
- Result: West Indies won the 3-match series 1–0
Most runs	Kraigg Brathwaite (341)	Joe Root (289)
Most wickets	Kemar Roach (11); Jayden Seales (11)	Jack Leach (11)
- Player of the series: Kraigg Brathwaite (WI)

Twenty20 International series
- Results: West Indies won the 5-match series 3–2
Most runs	Nicholas Pooran (164)	Jason Roy (130)
Most wickets	Jason Holder (15)	Adil Rashid (7)
- Player of the series: Jason Holder (WI)

The England cricket team toured the West Indies in January to play five Twenty20 International (T20I) matches. The England team also returned to the Caribbean in March to play three Test matches. The Test series was the first time that the teams played for the Richards–Botham Trophy. The Test series formed part of the 2021–2023 ICC World Test Championship. In October 2021, the schedule for the tour was confirmed, with the T20I matches taking place in January 2022, and the Test matches taking place in March 2022. Despite England losing The Ashes 4–0 in January 2022, Joe Root remained as England's Test captain.

Prior to the third T20I, England's captain Eoin Morgan ruled himself out of the match after feeling pain in his right quad during the warm-up session. Morgan was later ruled out of the rest of the T20I series, with Moeen Ali leading the team in his absence. The West Indies won the first T20I by nine wickets, with England winning the second match by one run. Rovman Powell scored his first century in a T20I match, as the West Indies won the third T20I by 20 runs. With an all-round performance from Moeen Ali, England won the fourth match by 34 runs to level the series 2–2. thanks to a five-wicket haul and a hat-trick from Jason Holder, the West Indies won the final match by 17 runs to win the series 3–2.

The first Test match ended in a draw. England had set the West Indies a target of 286 runs from 71 overs, with England only managing to take four wickets. The second Test was also drawn, with both captains scoring centuries. The West Indies won the third Test by ten wickets, to take the series 1–0. The defeat on the back of losing the Ashes series 4–0 called into question Root's captaincy, with several ex-England Test captains calling for Root to step down. On 15 April 2022, Root resigned as the captain of England's Test side with immediate effect. Root said it has been an honour to captain the side but how much of a toll it has taken on him.

== Squads ==
Tests		T20Is	
West Indies	England	West Indies	England
Kraigg Brathwaite (c); Jermaine Blackwood (vc); Nkrumah Bonner; Shamarh Brooks; John Campbell; Joshua Da Silva (wk); Jason Holder; Alzarri Joseph; Kyle Mayers; Veerasammy Permaul; Anderson Phillip; Kemar Roach; Jayden Seales	Joe Root (c); Jonny Bairstow; Zak Crawley; Matthew Fisher; Ben Foakes (wk); Dan Lawrence; Jack Leach; Alex Lees; Saqib Mahmood; Craig Overton; Matt Parkinson; Ollie Pope; Ollie Robinson; Ben Stokes; Chris Woakes; Mark Wood	Kieron Pollard (c); Nicholas Pooran (vc); Fabian Allen; Darren Bravo; Roston Chase; Sheldon Cottrell; Dominic Drakes; Shai Hope; Akeal Hosein; Jason Holder; Brandon King; Kyle Mayers; Rovman Powell; Romario Shepherd; Odean Smith; Hayden Walsh Jr.	Eoin Morgan (c); Moeen Ali (vc); Tom Banton; Sam Billings; Harry Brook; Liam Dawson; George Garton; Chris Jordan; Liam Livingstone; Saqib Mahmood; Tymal Mills; David Payne; Adil Rashid; Jason Roy; Phil Salt; Reece Topley; James Vince

Cricket West Indies named Jayden Seales, Alzarri Joseph and Devon Thomas named as reserves in their T20I squad. Harry Brook was added to England's T20I squad as cover for Sam Billings, after he was called up for the fifth Ashes Test in Hobart. On 8 February 2022, England named their Test squad for the tour, with James Anderson and Stuart Broad both left out. Jofra Archer and Olly Stone both joined up with England's Test squad, training alongside the team after recovering from injuries. On 6 March 2022, England named their twelve-man squad for the first Test, with Ollie Robinson ruled out of the match after suffering a back injury during the warm-up game. England's Mark Wood suffered an elbow injury in the first Test and was ruled out of the rest of the series.

== Tour matches ==
19 January 2022
16:00 (D/N)
Scorecard

England XI; 231/4 (20 overs)	v	Barbados Cricket Association President's XI; 137 (20 overs)
Jason Roy 115 (47); Ashley Nurse 2/20 (4 overs)		Shamar Springer 36 (23); Tymal Mills 3/25 (4 overs)

England XI won by 94 runs
Kensington Oval, Barbados
Umpires: Gregory Brathwaite (WI) and Patrick Gustard (WI)

- England XI won the toss and elected to bat.

1–4 March 2022
Scorecard

England XI	v	West Indies President's XI
466/6d (145 overs); Jonny Bairstow 106* (158); Bryan Charles 3/143 (48 overs)		264 (96.1 overs); Raymon Reifer 106 (182); Jack Leach 4/62 (28 overs)
164/4d (39 overs); Dan Lawrence 48 (41); Raymon Reifer 1/18 (4 overs)		123/7 (52.1 overs); Keacy Carty 49 (96); Craig Overton 2/12 (8 overs)

Match drawn
Coolidge Cricket Ground, Antigua
Umpires: Gregory Brathwaite (WI) and Nigel Duguid (WI)

- England XI won the toss and elected to bat.

== T20I series ==
=== 1st T20I ===
22 January 2022
16:00 (D/N)
Scorecard

England; 103 (19.4 overs)	v	West Indies; 104/1 (17.1 overs)
Chris Jordan 28 (23); Jason Holder 4/7 (3.4 overs)		Brandon King 52* (49); Adil Rashid 1/21 (4 overs)

West Indies won by 9 wickets
Kensington Oval, Barbados
Umpires: Gregory Brathwaite (WI) and Joel Wilson (WI)
Player of the match: Jason Holder (WI)

- West Indies won the toss and elected to field.

=== 2nd T20I ===
23 January 2022
16:00 (D/N)
Scorecard

England; 171/8 (20 overs)	v	West Indies; 170/8 (20 overs)
Jason Roy 45 (31); Jason Holder 2/25 (4 overs)		Akeal Hosein 44* (16); Moeen Ali 3/24 (4 overs)

England won by 1 run
Kensington Oval, Barbados
Umpires: Nigel Duguid (WI) and Joel Wilson (WI)
Player of the match: Moeen Ali (Eng)

- West Indies won the toss and elected to field.

=== 3rd T20I ===
26 January 2022
16:00 (D/N)
Scorecard

West Indies; 224/5 (20 overs)	v	England; 204/9 (20 overs)
Rovman Powell 107 (53); Adil Rashid 1/25 (4 overs)		Tom Banton 73 (39); Romario Shepherd 3/59 (4 overs)

West Indies won by 20 runs
Kensington Oval, Barbados
Umpires: Gregory Brathwaite (WI) and Leslie Reifer (WI)
Player of the match: Rovman Powell (WI)

- England won the toss and elected to field.
- Harry Brook, George Garton and Phil Salt (Eng) all made their T20I debuts.
- Rovman Powell (WI) scored his first century in T20Is.

=== 4th T20I ===
29 January 2022
16:00 (D/N)
Scorecard

England; 193/6 (20 overs)	v	West Indies; 159/5 (20 overs)
Moeen Ali 63 (28); Jason Holder 3/44 (4 overs)		Kyle Mayers 40 (23); Moeen Ali 2/28 (4 overs)

England won by 34 runs
Kensington Oval, Barbados
Umpires: Patrick Gustard (WI) and Leslie Reifer (WI)
Player of the match: Moeen Ali (Eng)

- West Indies won the toss and elected to field.

=== 5th T20I ===
30 January 2022
16:00 (D/N)
Scorecard

West Indies; 179/4 (20 overs)	v	England; 162 (19.5 overs)
Kieron Pollard 41* (25); Liam Livingstone 2/17 (3 overs)		James Vince 55 (35); Jason Holder 5/27 (2.5 overs)

West Indies won by 17 runs
Kensington Oval, Barbados
Umpires: Gregory Brathwaite (WI) and Nigel Duguid (WI)
Player of the match: Jason Holder (WI)

- West Indies won the toss and elected to bat.
- Jason Holder (WI) took his first five-wicket haul in T20Is.
- Jason Holder became the first bowler for West Indies to take a hat-trick in T20Is. He also became the fourth bowler to take four wickets in four balls in T20Is.

== Test series ==
=== 1st Test ===
8–12 March 2022
Scorecard

England	v	West Indies
311 (100.3 overs); Jonny Bairstow 140 (259); Jayden Seales 4/79 (22 overs)		375 (157.3 overs); Nkrumah Bonner 123 (355); Ben Stokes 2/42 (28 overs)
349/6d (88.2 overs); Zak Crawley 121 (216); Alzarri Joseph 3/78 (23.2 overs)		147/4 (70.1 overs); Nkrumah Bonner 38* (138); Jack Leach 3/57 (30.1 overs)

Match drawn
Sir Vivian Richards Stadium, Antigua
Umpires: Gregory Brathwaite (WI) and Joel Wilson (WI)
Player of the match: Nkrumah Bonner (WI)

- England won the toss and elected to bat.
- Alex Lees (Eng) made his Test debut.
- World Test Championship points: England 4, West Indies 2. (Note: West Indies were deducted two WTC points for a slow over-rate while bowling.)

England won the toss and Joe Root chose to bat. Despite playing some impressive shots, both Alex Lees and Zak Crawley were sent packing early on for 4 and 8, respectively. Joe Root went next, being dismissed for 13 runs as Kemar Roach would bag his second wicket. Dan Lawrence was then dismissed for 20, as England were left stranding at 48–4. Ben Stokes would then be joined by Jonny Bairstow, as they would notch up a 67-run stand. However, Jayden Seales would get his 2nd wicket, dismissing Stokes for 36 runs. Ben Foakes would then join Bairstow on the crease. Bairstow would go on to notch his 8th century. The partnership was finally broken at 214, when Holder would dismiss Foakes for 46 runs. Chris Woakes would then join Bairstow on the crease, as they would notch a 71-run stand. Seales would notch his 3rd wicket when he would dismiss Woakes for 28 runs. He would get his 4th wicket by dismissing Craig Overton for a duck. Alzarri Joseph would get his 1st wicket after dismissing Mark Wood for 1 run. England were finally dismissed for 311, after Joseph would dismiss Bairstow for 140 runs.

Kraigg Braithwaite and John Campbell would open the West Indian innings. They would dominate the English bowling attack and notch up an 85-run opening stand. Craig Overton would finally achieve a breakthrough, when he would dismiss Campbell for 35 runs. Braithwaite would continue the attack as he would notch up his fifty, until he was dismissed for 55 runs. Shamarh Brooks would then be dismissed for 18 runs. After Jermaine Blackwood was dismissed for 11 runs, West Indies was at 127–4. Jason Holder would then join Nkrumah Bonner on the crease, as they would notch a 79-run stand, before Holder was dismissed for 45 runs. Bonner would however go on to notch his 1st century. Joshua Da Silva would join Bonner for a 73-run stand, before being dismissed for 32 runs. Alzarri Joseph would soon follow after being dismissed for a mere 2 runs. Kemar Roach would then maintain a stable partnership with Brooks, as they would overtake England's score. Roach was run out for 15 runs, as West Indies were 326–8. Veerasammy Permaul would join Bonner to stich a 46-run stand, until Dan Lawrence would take his only wicket of the match to finally dismiss Bonner for 123 runs. Jayden Seales was dismissed for a duck, as West Indies were all out for 375 runs, with Permaul not out on 26 runs.

With England trailing by 64 runs, they would not start well as Alex Lees was dismissed for 6 runs by Kemar Roach as England were 24–1. However, Joe Root would come to the crease, as both Root and Zak Crawley would dominate the West Indian bowlers, notching up a 201-run stand. Zak Crawley would score his 2nd century, before being dismissed for 121 runs by Jason Holder. Dan Lawrence would join Root, as they would stich a 70-run stand. Root would go on to notch his 24th century. Lawrence was dismissed by Alzarri Joseph for 37 runs, as England would be at 295. Joe Root would follow next as Joseph would dismiss him for 109. England would start losing wickets in succession, as Ben Stokes was dismissed for 13 by Kemar Roach. Joseph would bag his 3rd wicket, by dismissing Ben Foakes for 1, as England would be 314–6. Jonny Bairstow and Chris Woakes would continue the resistance before Root would declare for 349, as Bairstow and Woakes were not out on 15 and 18, respectively.

With a target of 286 runs, Braithwaite and Campbell would open the innings and would dominate until both Braithwaite and Campbell were dismissed on 33 and 22, respectively. With the score at 59, West Indies would struggle as Brooks was dismissed by Jack Leach for 3. Leach would dismiss Blackwood for 2 to bag his 3rd wicket, as West Indies were 67–4. Bonner and Holder would then maintain an unbeatable 80-run stand as West Indies were at 147–4, when the match would end in a draw.

=== 2nd Test ===
16–20 March 2022
Scorecard

England	v	West Indies
507/9d (150.5 overs); Joe Root 153 (316); Veerasammy Permaul 3/126 (35.5 overs)		411 (187.5 overs); Kraigg Brathwaite 160 (489); Jack Leach 3/118 (69.5 overs)
185/6d (39.5 overs); Dan Lawrence 41 (39); Veerasammy Permaul 2/29 (10 overs)		135/5 (65 overs); Kraigg Brathwaite 56* (184); Jack Leach 3/36 (25 overs)

Match drawn
Kensington Oval, Barbados
Umpires: Nigel Duguid (WI) and Joel Wilson (WI)
Player of the match: Kraigg Brathwaite (WI)

- England won the toss and elected to bat.
- Matthew Fisher and Saqib Mahmood (Eng) both made their Test debuts.
- Joe Root (Eng) scored his 25th century in Tests.
- Ben Stokes (Eng) scored his 5,000th run in Tests.
- Kraigg Brathwaite (WI) scored his 10th century in Tests.
- World Test Championship points: West Indies 4, England 4.

=== 3rd Test ===
24–28 March 2022 (Note: While five days of play were scheduled for each Test, the third Test reached a result in four days.)
Scorecard

England	v	West Indies
204 (89.4 overs); Saqib Mahmood 49 (118); Jayden Seales 3/40 (17 overs)		297 (116.3 overs); Joshua Da Silva 100* (257); Chris Woakes 3/59 (25 overs)
120 (64.2 overs); Alex Lees 31 (132); Kyle Mayers 5/18 (17 overs)		28/0 (4.5 overs); Kraigg Brathwaite 20* (21)

West Indies won by 10 wickets
National Cricket Stadium, Grenada
Umpires: Gregory Brathwaite (WI) and Joel Wilson (WI)
Player of the match: Joshua Da Silva (WI)

- West Indies won the toss and elected to field.
- World Test Championship points: West Indies 12, England 0.
