= West Indian cricket team in England in 2020 =

International cricket tour

	England	West Indies
- Dates: 8 – 28 July 2020
Captains	Joe Root (Note: Ben Stokes captained England in the first Test.)	Jason Holder

Test series
- Result: England won the 3-match series 2–1
Most runs	Ben Stokes (363)	Jermaine Blackwood (211)
Most wickets	Stuart Broad (16)	Shannon Gabriel (11)
- Player of the series: Stuart Broad (Eng) and Roston Chase (WI)

The West Indies cricket team toured England to play three Test matches in 2020. The team were originally scheduled to tour the country in May and June 2020. However, the series was initially postponed due to the COVID-19 pandemic. Cricket West Indies stated that they would do everything they could to help accommodate the fixtures, including moving them back or even hosting them in the West Indies. A revised tour schedule was proposed on 25 May 2020 and confirmed on 2 June: this saw the series go ahead in July, with the matches all played behind closed doors. The Test series formed part of the inaugural 2019–2021 ICC World Test Championship.

The series was played for the Wisden Trophy. Ahead of the third Test, the England and Wales Cricket Board (ECB) and Cricket West Indies (CWI) agreed to retire the trophy following the conclusion of the series. It was replaced with the Richards–Botham Trophy, in honour of Sir Viv Richards and Sir Ian Botham.

On the morning of the fifth and final day of the third Test, England's Stuart Broad became the seventh bowler to take 500 wickets in Test cricket, when he dismissed Kraigg Brathwaite. Broad was the fourth fast bowler, and second bowler for England after James Anderson, to reach the milestone. England lost the first Test, but won the remaining two matches, to win the series 2–1, and regain the Wisden Trophy. It was the first time since 1888 that England had won a three-match Test series at home after losing the opening match.

The West Indies' tour was a major financial boost to English cricket during the pandemic, allowing the ECB to "keep the lights on", according to CEO Tom Harrison. To reciprocate the agreement, England expanded its Test tour of the West Indies in 2021–22 and toured again in white-ball cricket in 2023–24 and 2024–25.

== Background ==
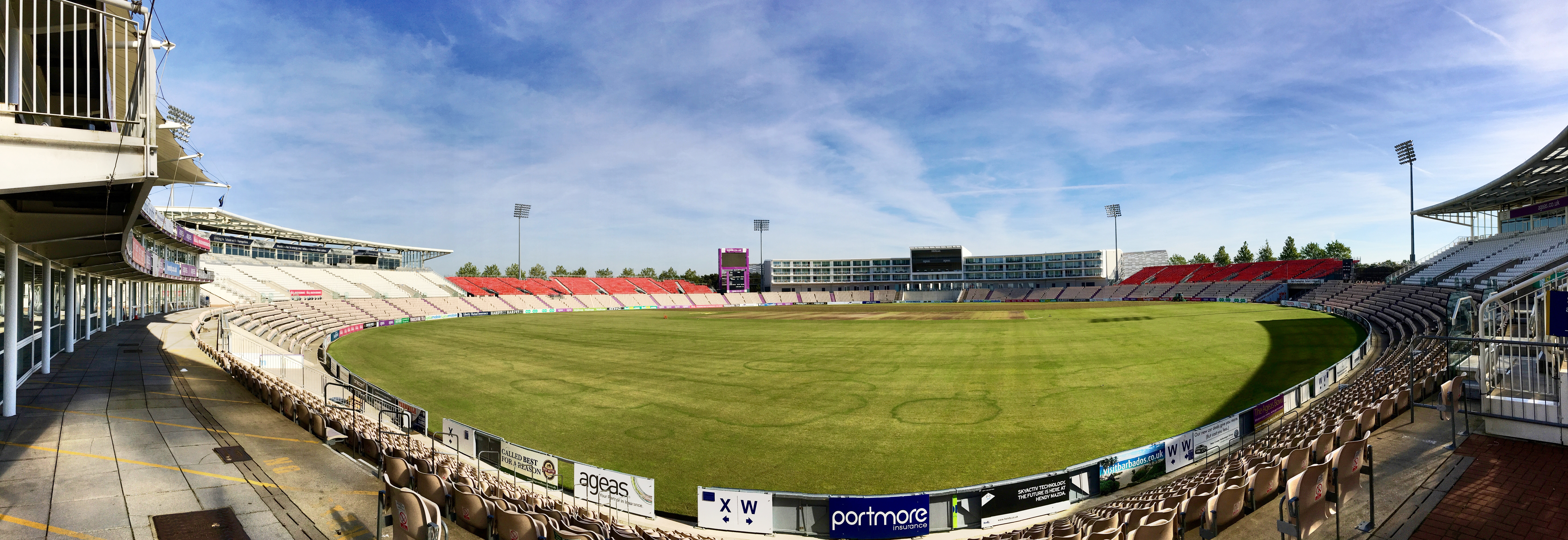
The Rose Bowl in Southampton hosted the first Test

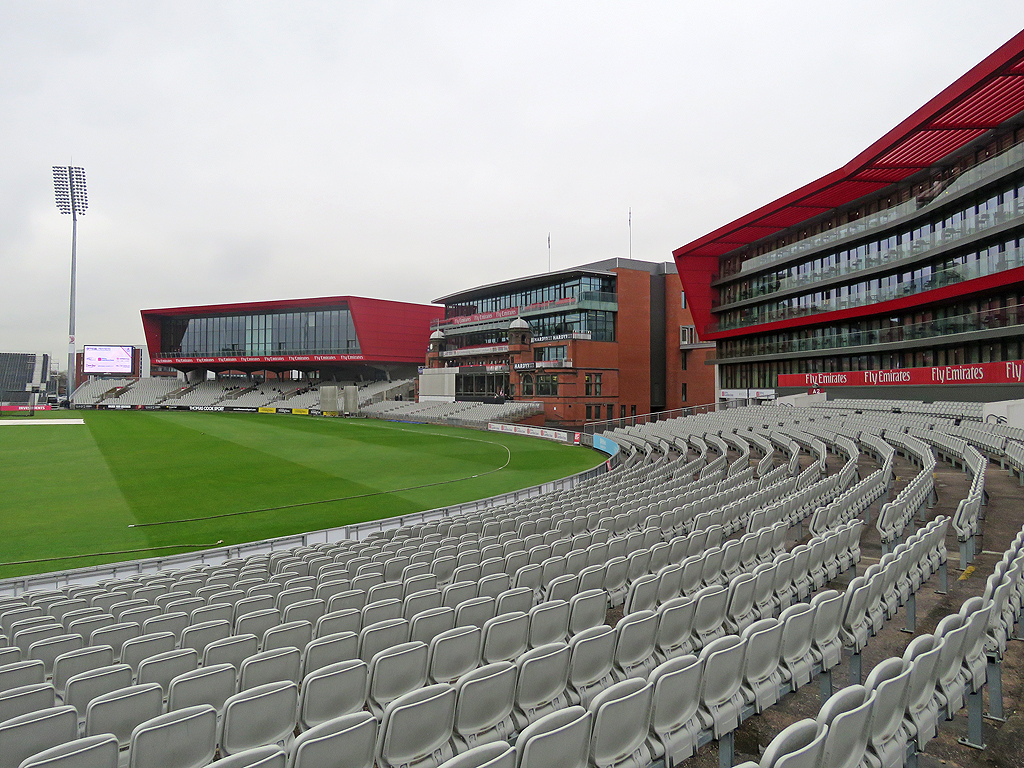
Old Trafford held both the second and third Tests. The hotel building is on the right of the photo

The England and Wales Cricket Board (ECB) announced that no professional matches would take place before 28 May 2020 due to the pandemic. In April 2020, Ashley Giles, the director of cricket, said that hosting the Test matches in June was looking "less and less likely", but that "everything is on the table" with regards to England's schedule in 2020. On 24 April 2020, the ECB confirmed that no professional cricket would be played in England before 1 July 2020, with the tour being postponed. After the tour was postponed, both cricket boards were involved in "positive" talks about rescheduling the series. This included the possibility of the visiting West Indies team going into isolation for 14 days, and the first Test match starting on 8 July 2020. The ECB were also looking at hosting the Test matches in bio-secure environments, with Old Trafford in Manchester and the Rose Bowl in Southampton being possible venues, due to their hotel facilities.

On 13 May 2020, Johnny Grave, the chief executive of Cricket West Indies, said that he was hopeful that the tour would go ahead, but that players would be "very nervous" about travelling. The next day, the ECB confirmed that England players would return to training in the following week. Grave also confirmed that thirty players had been identified for preparation for the tour, with the West Indies' Test captain Jason Holder saying that no one would be forced to travel, with safety being the priority. In late May 2020, a revised schedule was issued, with the final Test match taking place at Old Trafford in late July 2020. Grave also revealed details of a tentative tour itinerary, with the first Test starting on 8 July 2020 at the Rose Bowl in Southampton. The same week, the UK government published updated guidance on the resumption of training for elite sports. The West Indies also resumed training, with small groups taking part in on-field sessions at the Kensington Oval in Barbados. Cricket West Indies gave its approval "in principle" of touring England. On 2 June 2020, the ECB confirmed the dates and venues for the three-match series.

On 29 May 2020, the ECB named a 55-man group of players to begin training ahead of international fixtures starting in England. On 17 June 2020, this was trimmed down to a 30-man squad to prepare behind closed doors for the Test matches. England and the West Indies played intra-squad warm-up matches in Southampton and Manchester respectively prior to the Test series. On 3 June 2020, Cricket West Indies named a 14-man squad, along with eleven reserve players for the Test series. Darren Bravo, Shimron Hetmyer and Keemo Paul decided against travelling to England, due to coronavirus fears, and the length of time they could be away from their families. On 8 June 2020, the squad flew out from Antigua, arriving at Manchester Airport the following morning. After arrival, Jason Holder said that the players feel safe and that people "were crying out for cricket".

In June 2020, the International Cricket Council (ICC) made several interim changes to the Playing Conditions due to the pandemic. A substitute could be used for any player showing symptoms of COVID-19, but only in a Test match. Players were banned from using saliva to shine the ball, with five penalty runs being awarded to the opposition for repeated transgressions. The requirement to use neutral match officials was temporarily lifted, along with an increase to the number of DRS reviews a team can use, due to having less experienced umpires in a match. Michael Gough, Richard Illingworth and Richard Kettleborough were named as the on-field umpires for the Test matches, with Alex Wharf named as the fourth umpire. The last English umpire to stand in a home Test match was Peter Willey in the fifth Ashes Test in August 2001. The last time two English umpires stood in the same Test match in England was for the sixth Ashes Test in August 1993, when Mervyn Kitchen and Barrie Meyer were the on-field umpires.

== Squads ==
Tests
England	West Indies
Joe Root (c); Ben Stokes (vc); James Anderson; Jofra Archer; Dom Bess; Stuart Broad; Rory Burns; Jos Buttler (wk); Zak Crawley; Sam Curran; Joe Denly; Ollie Pope; Ollie Robinson; Dom Sibley; Chris Woakes; Mark Wood	Jason Holder (c); Kraigg Brathwaite (vc); Jermaine Blackwood; Nkrumah Bonner; Shamarh Brooks; John Campbell; Roston Chase; Rahkeem Cornwall; Shane Dowrich (wk); Shannon Gabriel; Chemar Holder; Shai Hope; Alzarri Joseph; Raymon Reifer; Kemar Roach

Cricket West Indies also named Sunil Ambris, Joshua Da Silva, Shannon Gabriel, Keon Harding, Kyle Mayers, Preston McSween, Marquino Mindley, Shayne Moseley, Anderson Phillip, Oshane Thomas and Jomel Warrican as reserve players for the Test series. Following the conclusion of their practice matches, Shannon Gabriel was added to the West Indies' Test squad.

England captain Joe Root missed the first Test match to be at the birth of his second child, with Ben Stokes captaining England in his absence. Prior to being named captain, Stokes had never led a side in a first-class, List A or Twenty20 cricket match. On 4 July 2020, England named a thirteen-man squad for the first Test with James Bracey, Sam Curran, Ben Foakes, Dan Lawrence, Jack Leach, Saqib Mahmood, Craig Overton, Ollie Robinson and Olly Stone also named as reserve players. Some of the cricketers not selected for the Test matches from the initial 30-man squad began preparing for the One Day International (ODI) matches against Ireland.

Joe Root returned to the squad for the second Test, with James Anderson and Mark Wood both being rested. Sam Curran and Ollie Robinson were named in England's squad for the second Test, with Robinson getting his maiden call-up to the senior team. On the morning of the second Test, Jofra Archer was dropped from England's squad for the fixture, after he breached biosecurity protocols. As a result, he was placed in isolation for five days, fined, and given a written warning by the ECB.

== Practice matches ==
The West Indies were due to play three tour matches, one each against England Lions, Worcestershire, and Northamptonshire. However, the tour matches were cancelled due to the COVID-19 pandemic. Instead, the 25-man touring squad played two intra-squad matches, serving as preparation. The squad was split into two teams, with one team being captained by Kraigg Brathwaite and the other being captained by Jason Holder. The teams were named after their respective captains. Initially, the second match was to have first-class status. However, the plan for this was changed after no play was possible on the first day of the fixture, allowing the West Indies to utilise all 25 players in their squad.

England also played an intra-squad match as warm-up, which started on 1 July 2020 at the Rose Bowl. England's squad was also split into two teams, with Ben Stokes captaining one side, and Jos Buttler captaining the other.

23–25 June 2020
Scorecard

Brathwaite XI	v	Holder XI
275 (79 overs); Kraigg Brathwaite 84 (162); Alzarri Joseph 4/60 (16 overs)		193 (51.1 overs); Sunil Ambris 52 (70); Raymon Reifer 5/60 (13 overs)
231/4d (51 overs); Shamarh Brooks 66* (99); Alzarri Joseph 2/17 (6 overs)		149/3 (44 overs); Shayne Moseley 83* (142); Oshane Thomas 1/8 (4 overs)

Match drawn
Old Trafford, Manchester
Umpires: Michael Gough (Eng) and Alex Wharf (Eng)

- Holder XI won the toss and elected to field.

29 June–2 July 2020
Scorecard

Holder XI	v	Brathwaite XI
272 (76.5 overs); Joshua Da Silva 133* (248); Preston McSween 3/28 (10.5 overs)		178 (34 overs); Kyle Mayers 74* (56); Shannon Gabriel 4/42 (8 overs)
171/4 (51 overs); Joshua Da Silva 56* (83); Anderson Phillip 2/20 (5 overs)

Match drawn
Old Trafford, Manchester
Umpires: Michael Gough (Eng) and Alex Wharf (Eng)

- Holder XI won the toss and elected to bat.
- No play was possible on day 1 due to rain.

1–3 July 2020
Scorecard

Team Buttler	v	Team Stokes
287/5d (90 overs); James Bracey 85 (194); Craig Overton 2/32 (14 overs)		233 (87.5 overs); Zak Crawley 43 (77); Ollie Robinson 2/7 (9 overs)
200/6d (41.4 overs); Ollie Pope 55* (66); Jack Leach 3/82 (13.4 overs)		157/4 (30.2 overs); Jonny Bairstow 39 (47); Matt Parkinson 2/47 (7 overs)

Match drawn
Rose Bowl, Southampton
Umpires: Richard Illingworth (Eng) and Richard Kettleborough (Eng)

- Team Stokes won the toss and elected to field.

== Test series ==
=== 1st Test ===
8–12 July 2020
Scorecard

England	v	West Indies
204 (67.3 overs); Ben Stokes 43 (97); Jason Holder 6/42 (20 overs)		318 (102 overs); Kraigg Brathwaite 65 (125); Ben Stokes 4/49 (14 overs)
313 (111.2 overs); Zak Crawley 76 (127); Shannon Gabriel 5/75 (21.2 overs)		200/6 (64.2 overs); Jermaine Blackwood 95 (154); Jofra Archer 3/45 (17 overs)

West Indies won by 4 wickets
Rose Bowl, Southampton
Umpires: Richard Illingworth (Eng) and Richard Kettleborough (Eng)
Player of the match: Shannon Gabriel (WI)

- England won the toss and elected to bat.
- Only 17.4 overs of play was possible on day 1 due to rain. 26.3 overs of play were lost on day 2 due to bad light.
- Ben Stokes captained England for the first time in Tests.
- Ben Stokes (Eng) became the sixth cricketer to score 4,000 runs and take 150 wickets in Tests.
- World Test Championship points: West Indies 40, England 0.

=== 2nd Test ===
16–20 July 2020
Scorecard

England	v	West Indies
469/9d (162 overs); Ben Stokes 176 (356); Roston Chase 5/172 (44 overs)		287 (99 overs); Kraigg Brathwaite 75 (165); Chris Woakes 3/42 (21 overs)
129/3d (19 overs); Ben Stokes 78* (57); Kemar Roach 2/37 (6 overs)		198 (70.1 overs); Shamarh Brooks 62 (136); Stuart Broad 3/42 (15 overs)

England won by 113 runs
Old Trafford, Manchester
Umpires: Michael Gough (Eng) and Richard Illingworth (Eng)
Player of the match: Ben Stokes (Eng)

- West Indies won the toss and elected to field.
- No play was possible on day 3 due to rain.
- Ben Stokes (Eng) scored his 10th century in Tests.
- Chris Woakes (Eng) took his 100th wicket in Tests.
- This was England's 50th win against the West Indies in Tests.
- World Test Championship points: England 40, West Indies 0.

=== 3rd Test ===
24–28 July 2020
Scorecard

England	v	West Indies
369 (111.5 overs); Ollie Pope 91 (150); Kemar Roach 4/72 (25.4 overs)		197 (65 overs); Jason Holder 46 (82); Stuart Broad 6/31 (14 overs)
226/2d (58 overs); Rory Burns 90 (163); Jason Holder 1/24 (9 overs)		129 (37.1 overs); Shai Hope 31 (38); Chris Woakes 5/50 (11 overs)

England won by 269 runs
Old Trafford, Manchester
Umpires: Michael Gough (Eng) and Richard Kettleborough (Eng)
Player of the match: Stuart Broad (Eng)

- West Indies won the toss and elected to field.
- No play was possible on day 4 due to rain.
- Kemar Roach (WI) took his 200th wicket in Tests.
- Stuart Broad (Eng) took his 500th wicket in Tests.
- World Test Championship points: England 40, West Indies 0.
