= Shirley Clarke (cricketer) =

Barbadian cricketer (born 1977)

Personal information
- Born: 21 January 1977 (age 49); Saint James, Barbados
- Relatives: Kyle Mayers (son)
- Source: Cricinfo, 13 November 2020

Shirley Clarke (born 21 January 1977) is a Barbadian cricketer. He played in twelve first-class and five List A matches for Barbados, and Combined Campuses and Colleges from 1999 to 2008.

He is a Level 3 coach and coached his son Kyle Mayers.

== See also ==
- List of Barbadian representative cricketers
