= Kyle Mayers =

West Indian cricketer

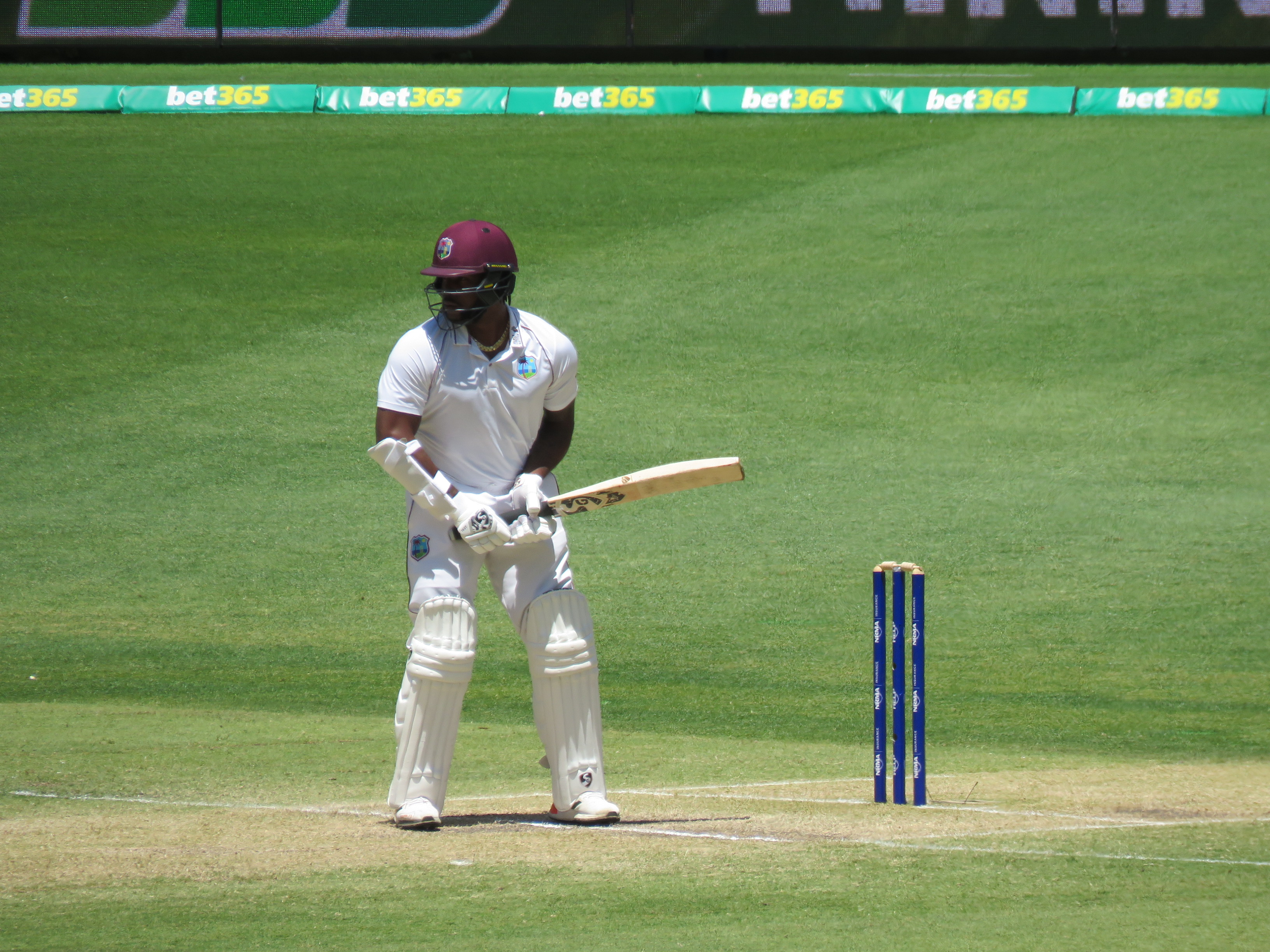
- Mayers batting in 2022

Personal information
- Full name: Kyle Rico Mayers
- Born: 8 September 1992 (age 34); Bridgetown, Barbados
- Batting: Left-handed
- Bowling: Right-arm medium
- Role: Batting all-rounder
- Relatives: Shirley Clarke (father)

International information
- National side: West Indies (2020–present)
- Test debut (cap 380): 4 February 2021 v Bangladesh
- Last Test: 8 March 2023 v South Africa
- ODI debut (cap 202): 20 January 2021 v Bangladesh
- Last ODI: 1 August 2023 v India
- T20I debut (cap 84): 29 November 2020 v New Zealand
- Last T20I: 30 September 2025 v Nepal

Domestic team information
- Years: Team
- 2011/12–2014/15: Combined Campuses and Colleges
- 2012/13, 2019/20–present: Barbados
- 2013–2014: Barbados Tridents
- 2015–2017: St Lucia Zouks
- 2015/16–2018/19: Windward Islands
- 2017–2020: Barbados Tridents
- 2021: Warwickshire
- 2022/23–2023/24: Durban's Super Giants
- 2023: Lucknow Super Giants
- 2024: Fortune Barishal
- 2024–present: St Kitts & Nevis Patriots
- 2024/25: Abu Dhabi Knight Riders
- 2025: Islamabad United
- 2025: Seattle Orcas
- 2025/26: Gulf Giants
- 2025/26: Rangpur Riders

Career statistics
Competition	Test	ODI	T20I	FC
Matches	18	28	41	53
Runs scored	949	660	773	2581
Batting average	32.72	25.38	20.89	30.72
100s/50s	2/2	2/2	0/3	4/15
Top score	210*	120	73	210*
Balls bowled	1524	686	120	5167
Wickets	34	14	2	107
Bowling average	18.29	45.14	95.50	21.48
5 wickets in innings	1	0	0	4
10 wickets in match	0	–	–	0
Best bowling	5/18	2/30	2/26	6/29
Catches/stumpings	10/–	10/–	17/–	34/–
- Source: ESPNcricinfo, 31 December 2025

Kyle Rico Mayers (born 8 September 1992) is a Barbadian cricketer. He plays international cricket for West Indies cricket team in all formats. He was also in the West Indies under-19 squad for the 2012 ICC Under-19 Cricket World Cup. In February 2021, on his Test debut, Mayers scored 210 not out.

He is the son of Shirley Clarke, who also played first-class cricket.

== Career ==
In October 2019, Mayers was selected to play for Barbados in the 2019–20 Regional Super50 tournament. In November 2019, he traveled to Ft Lauderdale, Florida to participate in the US Open. He represented the Paramveer Tigers along with other international likes of Kjorn Ottley, Ian Cockbain, Max Waller, Delray Rawlins, Alex Blake, Elmore Hutchinson, Ravi Timbawala, Timil Patel, Japen Patel and many more. In January 2020, on the opening day of the 2019–20 West Indies Championship, Mayers scored his maiden century in first-class cricket.

In June 2020, Mayers was named as one of eleven reserve players in the West Indies' Test squad, for their series against England. The Test series was originally scheduled to start in May 2020, but was moved back to July 2020 due to the COVID-19 pandemic.

In July 2020, Mayers was named in the Barbados Tridents squad for the 2020 Caribbean Premier League. In October 2020, Mayers was also named in the West Indies' Twenty20 International (T20I) squad for their series against New Zealand. He made his T20I debut for the West Indies on 29 November 2020, against New Zealand.

In December 2020, Mayers was named in the West Indies' Test and One Day International (ODI) squads for their series against Bangladesh. He made his ODI debut for the West Indies, against Bangladesh, on 20 January 2021. He made his Test debut for the West Indies, also against Bangladesh, on 3 February 2021. On his debut, Mayers scored a century to become the 14th batsman for the West Indies to score a century on debut in Test cricket. He finished his innings on 210 not out, becoming the sixth batsman to score a double century on his Test debut, guiding the West Indies to a successful chase of 395, the fifth largest in test history. In May 2021, Mayers was awarded with a maiden red-ball central contract from Cricket West Indies.

In February 2022, Mayers was bought by the Lucknow Super Giants in the auction for the 2022 Indian Premier League tournament.

On 27 March 2022, Mayers took his first Test match five-wicket haul against England, in the second innings of the third test of England's tour of West Indies in St. George's. He finished with figures of five for eighteen and with seven wickets in the match. On 4 June 2022, in the third and final match of the series against the Netherlands, Mayers scored his first century in ODI cricket, with 120 runs. He then went on to score another ODI Century this time against New Zealand scoring 105.

Mayers made his IPL debut for Lucknow Super Giants against Delhi Capitals on 1 April 2023, scoring 73 off 38 balls, also bowling a single over.
