= Camarie Boyce =

West Indian cricketer (born 1999)

Personal information
- Full name: Camarie Boyce
- Born: 15 October 1999 (age 27); Barbados
- Source: Cricinfo, 8 November 2019

Camarie Boyce (born 15 October 1999) is a Barbadian cricketer. He made his List A debut on 7 November 2019, for the West Indies Emerging Team in the 2019–20 Regional Super50 tournament. He made his first-class debut on 7 February 2020, for Barbados in the 2019–20 West Indies Championship, taking a five-wicket haul in the first innings.
