= Colin Archibald =

West Indian cricketer (born 1996)

Personal information
- Born: 20 October 1996 (age 30); Nevis

Career statistics
Competition	FC	LA	T20
Matches	3	5	3
Runs scored	90	62	2
Batting average	15.00	15.50	1.00
100s/50s	0/1	0/0	0/0
Top score	53	32*	2
Balls bowled	372	138	25
Wickets	5	3	0
Bowling average	41.00	43.33	-
5 wickets in innings	0	0	0
10 wickets in match	0	0	0
Best bowling	2/70	3/36	-/-
Catches/stumpings	0/–	1/–	0/–
- Source: Cricinfo, 8 October 2021

Colin Archibald (born 20 October 1996) is a Nevisian professional cricketer. He made his List A debut on 15 November 2019, for the Leeward Islands in the 2019–20 Regional Super50 tournament. He made his first-class debut on 9 January 2020, for the Leeward Islands in the 2019–20 West Indies Championship.

In July 2020, he was a member of the St Kitts & Nevis Patriots squad for the 2020 Caribbean Premier League (CPL). He made his Twenty20 debut on 3 September 2020, for the St Kitts & Nevis Patriots in the 2020 CPL.

In May 2022, in the fourth round of the 2021–22 West Indies Championship, Archibald scored his maiden century in first-class cricket.
