= Ollie Robinson =

English cricketer (born 1993)

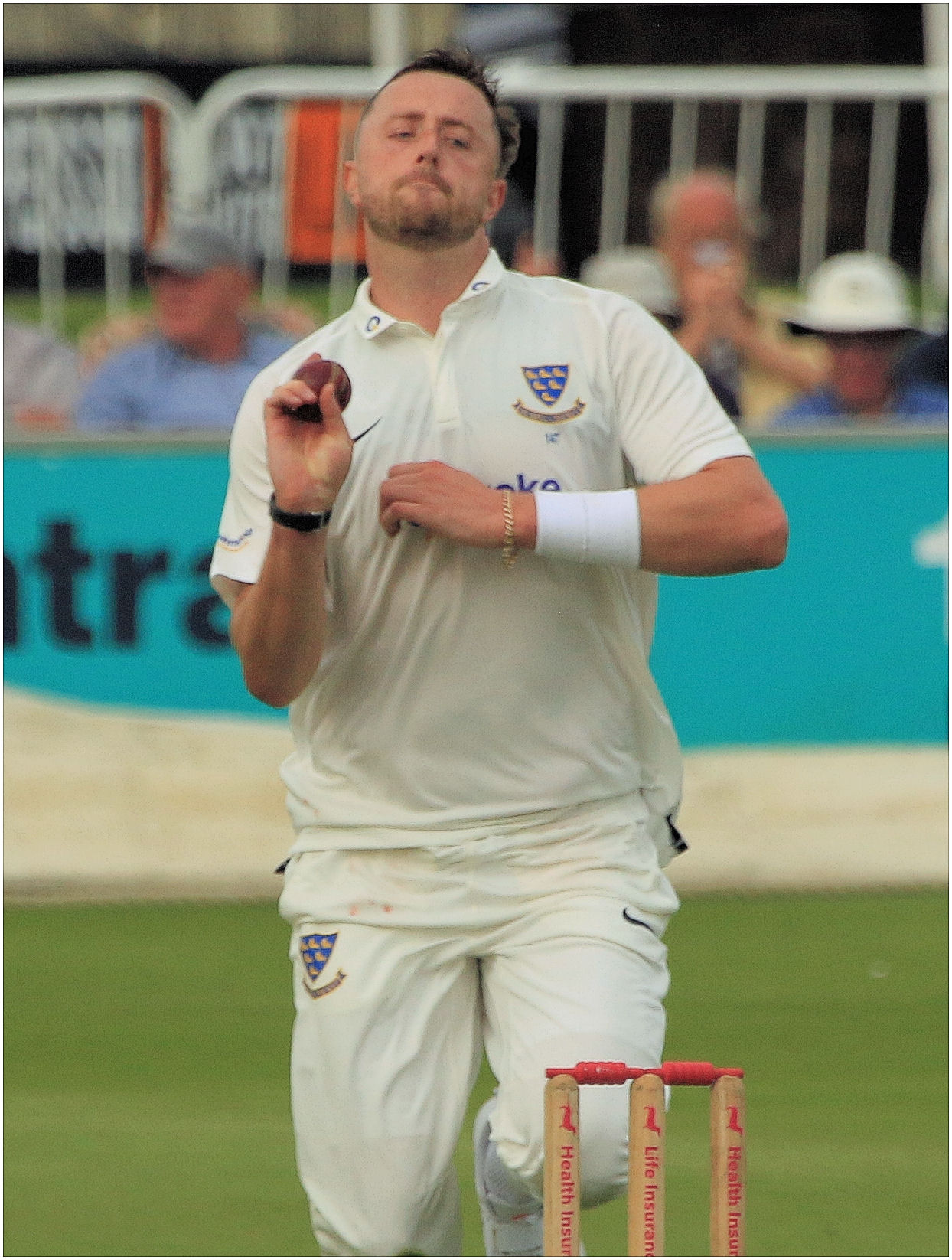
- Robinson in May 2024

Personal information
- Full name: Oliver Edward Robinson
- Born: 1 December 1993 (age 32); Margate, Kent, England
- Nickname: Robbo
- Height: 6 ft 5 in (1.96 m)
- Batting: Right-handed
- Bowling: Right-arm medium-fast
- Role: Bowler

International information
- National side: England (2021–present)
- Test debut (cap 699): 2 June 2021 v New Zealand
- Last Test: 9 September 2026 v Pakistan

Domestic team information
- Years: Team
- 2013–2014: Yorkshire
- 2014: Hampshire
- 2015–present: Sussex (squad no. 25)
- 2024: Trent Rockets

Career statistics
Competition	Test	FC	LA	T20
Matches	24	122	20	77
Runs scored	498	2,904	149	231
Batting average	14.64	20.59	14.90	10.50
100s/50s	0/2	2/9	0/0	0/0
Top score	58	110	30	31
Balls bowled	4,479	22,586	912	1,464
Wickets	104	520	25	72
Bowling average	19.25	21.09	34.88	28.79
5 wickets in innings	5	28	0	0
10 wickets in match	0	7	0	0
Best bowling	5/39	9/78	3/31	4/15
Catches/stumpings	8/–	41/–	8/–	33/–
- Source: ESPNcricinfo, 12 September 2026

Oliver Edward Robinson (born 1 December 1993) is an English professional cricketer. In domestic cricket, he plays for Sussex as a right-arm medium-pace bowler, having previously played for Yorkshire and Hampshire. He made his Test debut for England in 2021, and played 23 matches. He most recently played for England against New Zealand in 2026, making a comeback to test cricket after a long break. Robinson holds the record for the most expensive over ever bowled in the English County Championship, conceding 43 against Leicestershire in June 2024.

== Domestic career ==
Robinson began his career playing for Margate Cricket Club Kent Second XI. After one match of the 2013 season, he left Kent for Leicestershire before playing for Yorkshire Second XI. He finished the 2013 season with 59 wickets and 1,282 runs in Second XI cricket, and made his first-team List A debut for Yorkshire in July 2013 against Leicestershire. In October 2013, Robinson signed a professional contract with Yorkshire.

After making seven T20 Blast appearances for Yorkshire during the 2014 season Robinson was sacked by Yorkshire in July for unprofessional actions, mostly related to poor timekeeping. Later in the 2014 season Robinson made one List A appearance for Hampshire.

In April 2015, Sussex signed Robinson on a short-term deal, after an injury crisis with bowlers Tymal Mills, James Anyon and Lewis Hatchett all unavailable. Robinson had played a Second XI match for Sussex and was named in the squad for a County Championship match the next day against Durham where he made his first-class debut. In the match Robinson, batting at number nine, scored a century in a Sussex record-breaking tenth-wicket partnership with Matt Hobden of 164. In doing so, he became the first Sussex player in 95 years to score a century on their County Championship debut. (Note: Ollie Rayner scored a century on debut in a tour match against Sri Lanka in 2006.) Robinson took his first five-wicket haul in May 2015 against Warwickshire. In the 2015 season, Robinson took 46 Championship wickets at an average of 24.71, and was nominated for the LV= Breakthrough Player Award and won the Sussex Young Player of the Year award. In October 2015, Robinson signed a new three-year contract with Sussex.

In April 2021, Robinson was named Sussex vice-captain in County Championship matches. That month, he took 9 wickets for 78 runs in a County Championship match against Glamorgan; it was the best bowling figures by an Englishman since 2016.

On 10 June 2021, Robinson announced that he was taking a "short break from the game", with Sussex saying that he would be unavailable for their first two games of the 2021 t20 Blast. In July 2021, Robinson was signed by the Manchester Originals for the 2021 season of The Hundred, as a replacement for Harry Gurney. In April 2022, he was bought by the Manchester Originals for the 2022 season of The Hundred.

Playing for Sussex against Leicestershire on 26 June 2024, Robinson conceded 43 runs off one over in what was the most expensive over in the history of the County Championship.

In January 2026, Robinson was named as captain of Sussex red-ball team for that year's County Championship season.

== International career ==
On 29 May 2020, Robinson was named in a 55-man group of players to begin training ahead of international fixtures starting in England following the COVID-19 pandemic. On 17 June 2020, he was included in England's 30-man squad to start training behind closed doors for the Test series against the West Indies. On 4 July 2020, Robinson was named as one of the nine reserve players for the first Test match of the series. He was then named in England's squad for the second Test match of the series, his maiden call-up to the senior team. On 12 August 2020, he was also named in England's squad for the second Test against Pakistan.

In December 2020, Robinson was named as one of seven reserve players in England's Test squad for their series against Sri Lanka. In January 2021, he was also named as a reserve player in England's Test squad for their series against India.

In May 2021, Robinson was included in England's Test squad for their series against New Zealand. He made his Test debut on 2 June 2021, for England against New Zealand. His first Test international wicket was Tom Latham. On the day of his international Test debut, Robinson apologised for making racist and sexist tweets in 2012 and 2013. The England and Wales Cricket Board (ECB) launched an investigation, on 3 June 2021, to consider whether Robinson should be sanctioned for the tweets. On 6 June 2021, Robinson was removed from the England squad for the second Test match of the series, and suspended from all formats of international cricket by the ECB. Oliver Dowden, the Secretary of State for Digital, Culture, Media and Sport, described the ECB sanctions as "over the top". He asked the ECB to reconsider the suspension, saying: "They are also a decade old and written by a teenager". Later, British Prime Minister Boris Johnson stated that he agreed with Dowden. On 3 July 2021, Robinson was cleared to return to cricket, following a hearing by the Cricket Discipline Commission. Later the same month, Robinson was named in England's Test squad for their series against India. In the first match, Robinson took his first five-wicket haul in Test cricket, with 5/85. Robinson was England's leading wicket taker in the summer (28 wickets with an average of 19.60); he was named as one of Wisden's five cricketers of the year in April 2022.

Robinson returned to the England Test team in June 2026 against New Zealand at Lord's, taking three wickets in his first over and recording career-best first-innings figures of 5/39. He was named Player of the Match after finishing with match figures of 7/77 in England’s victory. He was ruled out of the second test with a knee injury.

In August 2026, during the first Test against Pakistan, Robinson recorded his best ever Test match bowling figures of 8/80 across both innings, as he won player of the match.

Having taken 28 wickets in four Tests at an average of 9.30, he was named the 2026 Cricket Media Club England Player of the Year.

== Personal life ==
Robinson was educated at The King's School, Canterbury. His stepfather is Lancashire Director of Cricket Paul Farbrace He married Mia Baker, a sports and fashion influencer, on 10 October 2025. The couple's first child Eva was born in August 2026; Robinson also has one child from a previous relationship.
