= Terrance Hinds =

Trinidadian cricketer (born 1992)

Personal information
- Full name: Terrance Hinds
- Born: 23 January 1992 (age 34); Trinidad
- Batting: Right-handed
- Bowling: Right-arm medium-fast
- Role: Bowler

International information
- National side: West Indies (2024)
- T20I debut (cap 98): 10 November 2024 v England
- Last T20I: 14 November 2024 v England

Domestic team information
- Years: Team
- 2018–present: Trinbago Knight Riders (squad no. 64)
- 2020–present: Trinidad and Tobago (squad no. 64)
- 2024: Surrey Jaguars
- 2025: Abu Dhabi Knight Riders

Career statistics
| Competition | T20I | FC | LA | T20 |
|---|---|---|---|---|
| Matches | 2 | 21 | 19 | 18 |
| Runs scored | 5 | 844 | 150 | 38 |
| Batting average | – | 38.36 | 25.00 | 12.66 |
| 100s/50s | 0/0 | 1/6 | 0/0 | 0/0 |
| Top score | 5* | 102* | 26* | 14* |
| Balls bowled | 26 | 2132 | 615 | 285 |
| Wickets | 1 | 30 | 21 | 13 |
| Bowling average | 54.00 | 40.86 | 28.95 | 35.53 |
| 5 wickets in innings | 0 | 1 | 0 | 0 |
| 10 wickets in match | 0 | 0 | 0 | 0 |
| Best bowling | 1/30 | 5/32 | 4/15 | 3/17 |
| Catches/stumpings | 0/– | 7/– | 2/– | 0/– |
- Source: Cricinfo, 2 April 2025

Terrance Hinds (born 1992) is a Trinidadian cricketer. He made his Twenty20 debut for Trinbago Knight Riders in the 2018 Caribbean Premier League on 7 September 2018. He made his first-class debut on 9 January 2020, for Trinidad and Tobago in the first round of the 2019–20 West Indies Championship. In the next round of matches, he scored his maiden century in first-class cricket, with an unbeaten 102 runs.

In May 2022, in round four of the 2021–22 West Indies Championship, Hinds took his maiden five-wicket haul in first-class cricket, with 5/32 against Barbados.
