= Leroy Lugg =

Jamaican cricketer

Personal information
- Full name: Leroy St Aubin Lugg
- Born: 5 August 1996 (age 30)
- Batting: Right-handed

Domestic team information
- Years: Team
- 2021/22: Jamaica

Career statistics
Competition	First-class
Matches	4
Runs scored	173
Batting average	24.71
100s/50s	0/1
Top score	67
Catches/stumpings	0/–
- Source: Cricinfo, 1 August 2022

Leroy St Aubin Lugg (born 5 August 1996) is a Jamaican first-class cricketer.

Lugg was born at Kingston in August 1996. He played for the West Indies under-19 cricket team in 2013, making six Youth One Day International appearances during the series. In the opening match, Lugg scored 69 runs, but was disappointed with his performance, considering himself to have not been timing the ball well during his innings. In 2022, he was one of three debutants included in the Jamaica squad for their first two 2021–22 West Indies Championship matches, with Lugg making his debut in first-class cricket against Trinidad and Tobago. He made his Twenty20 debut on 1 September 2022, for Saint Lucia Kings in the 2022 Caribbean Premier League.
