= Ryan John =

West Indian cricketer (born 1997)

Personal information
- Full name: Ryan Daniel John
- Born: 25 September 1997 (age 29); Grenada
- Batting: Right-handed
- Bowling: Right-arm medium-fast
- Role: All-rounder

Domestic team information
- Years: Team
- 2017/18–present: Windward Islands
- 2024: St Kitts & Nevis Patriots

Career statistics
Competition	FC	LA
Matches	10	21
Runs scored	309	215
Batting average	19.31	11.31
100s/50s	0/1	0/0
Top score	51*	44
Balls bowled	1525	690
Wickets	26	22
Bowling average	29.30	31.27
5 wickets in innings	1	0
10 wickets in match	0	0
Best bowling	5/18	4/57
Catches/stumpings	5/–	7/–
- Source: Cricinfo, 8 February 2024

Ryan Daniel John (born 25 September 1997) is a West Indian cricketer. He made his List A debut for the Windward Islands in the 2017–18 Regional Super50 on 11 February 2018. Prior to his List A debut, he was named in the West Indies' squad for the 2016 Under-19 Cricket World Cup. In October 2019, he was named in the Windward Islands' squad for the 2019–20 Regional Super50 tournament. He made his first-class debut on 27 February 2020, for the Windward Islands in the 2019–20 West Indies Championship.
