= Rahkeem Cornwall =

West Indian cricketer

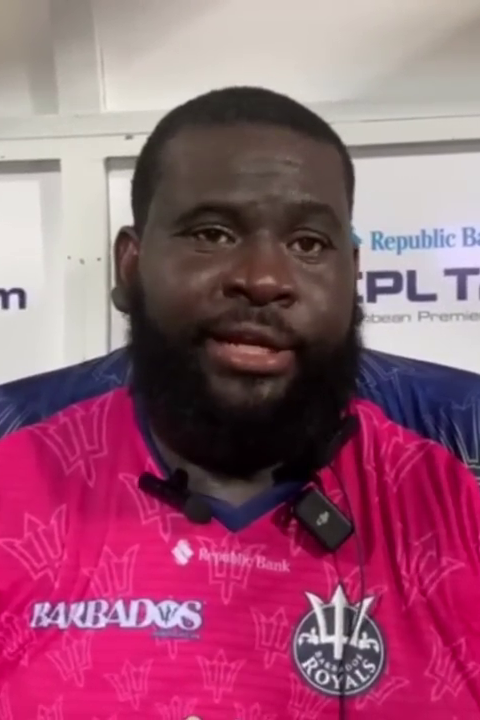

Personal information
- Full name: Rahkeem Rashawn Shane Cornwall
- Born: 1 February 1993 (age 33); Antigua, Antigua and Barbuda
- Nickname: Jimbo
- Height: 198 cm (6 ft 6 in)
- Batting: Right-handed
- Bowling: Right-arm off break
- Role: All-rounder

International information
- National side: West Indies
- Test debut (cap 319): 30 August 2019 v India
- Last Test: 12 July 2023 v India

Domestic team information
- Years: Team
- 2011–present: Leeward Islands
- 2013–2014: Antigua Hawksbills
- 2017–2021: Saint Lucia Zouks / Kings
- 2022–2024: Barbados Royals
- 2025: Sylhet Strikers
- 2025: Antigua & Barbuda Falcons

Career statistics
Competition	Test	FC	LA	T20
Matches	10	98	72	95
Runs scored	261	3,389	1,702	1,473
Batting average	18.64	22.44	29.85	18.18
100s/50s	0/2	1/19	4/6	1/5
Top score	73	101*	132*	102*
Balls bowled	2761	23,039	3,376	1,023
Wickets	35	452	95	49
Bowling average	37.60	24.00	23.08	27.04
5 wickets in innings	2	28	2	1
10 wickets in match	1	7	0	0
Best bowling	7/75	8/51	6/20	5/16
Catches/stumpings	15/–	91/–	29/–	7/–
- Source: Cricinfo, 8 July 2026

Rahkeem Rashawn Shane Cornwall (born 1 February 1993) is an Antiguan cricketer. A right-arm off-break bowler, Cornwall has played for Leeward Islands cricket team and featured in the line-up for the Antigua Hawksbills and the Barbados Royals in the Caribbean Premier League. In August 2019, Cricket West Indies named him as the Championship Player of the Year. Later the same month, he made his international debut for the West Indies cricket team. He also set the record for the heaviest cricketer to play Test cricket, weighing more than 140 kg (22 stone). For the Leewards Islands, he is their second highest wicket-taker in both First Class and List A cricket, while only Kieran Powell has scored more than his four List A hundreds for the team.

== Career ==
In July 2016, he was chosen for the West Indies Cricket Board President's XI to face the touring Indian Team; he top-scored in his team's first innings with 41, before taking 5 wickets in India's innings. For the same team in 2017, he faced the touring England team; he scored an important 59 runs in a partnership of 123, helping his team recover from 55–5 to 233. He then took 1 wicket in an economical bowling spell in the narrow loss. He once again played for the Cricket Board President's XI against Pakistan in a warm-up game during their 2017 tour. In October 2016, he was selected for the West Indies A tour of Sri Lanka, taking part in all three unofficial Test matches; while disappointing with the bat, he went on to take a series-high 23 wickets at an average of below 20. In a Regional Four Day Competition game versus Guyana in April 2017, he captained the Leeward Islands in the absence of Kieran Powell, who had been recalled to the West Indies Test team. He finished the competition as the joint third-highest wicket-taker, with the most for his team. Cornwall spent several months playing in England, during which time he played for Thames Ditton CC and was used as a lethal bowler and occasionally damaging batsman.

In 2017, he was selected by the St Lucia Stars in the CPL Draft for the upcoming season. In a disappointing season for the team, Cornwall was one of the more promising members of the squad; he finished the tournament with the second-best batting average in the team, as well being one of its more economical bowlers. His best performance came in a loss to the Barbados Tridents; having been promoted up the order to open, Cornwall reached his 50 off 26 balls (his first in T20 cricket), giving the Stars hope of chasing their target of 196. However, he retired hurt on 78 after being hit in the stomach by a bouncer from Kieron Pollard with 47 runs needed from 3 overs. This decision was not well received by Pollard, and St Lucia went on to lose the match.

He was the leading wicket-taker for the Leeward Islands in the 2018–19 Regional Super50 tournament, with fourteen dismissals in eight matches. He was then the top wicket-taker in the 2018–19 Regional Four Day competition, taking 54 wickets, despite only playing nine matches; these performances helped his team to 3rd place in the table. However, a controversial declaration by Cornwall, who was stand-in captain for the last game of the season, in an attempt to stop their opponents, Barbados, from finishing second, backfired spectacularly.

In August 2019, he was named in the West Indies' Test squad for their series against India. He made his Test debut for the West Indies, against India, on 30 August 2019. At 140 kg (308 lbs/22 st), he is the heaviest man to play Test cricket, though no accurate record exists of the weight of W.G.Grace in 1899, the year of his retirement.

In October 2019, he was named in the Leeward Islands' squad for the 2019–20 Regional Super50 tournament. The following month, in the one-off Test match against Afghanistan, Cornwall took his first five-wicket haul in Test cricket.

In June 2020, Cornwall was named in the West Indies' Test squad, for their series against England. The Test series was originally scheduled to start in May 2020, but was moved back to July 2020 due to the COVID-19 pandemic.

In July 2020, he was named in the St Lucia Zouks squad for the 2020 Caribbean Premier League. In June 2021, he was selected to take part in the Minor League Cricket tournament in the United States following the players' draft. He was the highest wicket-taker with 35 wickets in the 2022–23 West Indies Championship.
