= Keon Harding =

West Indian cricketer (born 1996)

Personal information
- Full name: Keon Jovani Harding
- Born: 1 November 1996 (age 30)
- Batting: Right-handed
- Bowling: Right-arm medium-fast
- Role: Bowler

International information
- National side: West Indies
- Only ODI (cap 205): 25 January 2021 v Bangladesh

Domestic team information
- Years: Team
- 2017-present: Combined Campuses and Colleges
- 2017-present: Barbados

Career statistics
Competition	FC	LA	T20
Matches	17	22	1
Runs scored	198	99	–
Batting average	10.42	11.00	–
100s/50s	0/0	0/0	–
Top score	27*	18*	–
Balls bowled	2,155	988	6
Wickets	54	35	0
Bowling average	25.11	24.42	-
5 wickets in innings	4	0	–
10 wickets in match	0	0	–
Best bowling	5/19	4/35	–
Catches/stumpings	8/–	11/–	1/–
- Source: ESPNcricinfo, 9 October 2021

Keon Harding (born 1 November 1996) is a Barbadian cricketer. He made his international debut for the West Indies cricket team in January 2021.

== Career ==
He made his List A debut for Combined Campuses and Colleges in the 2016–17 Regional Super50 on 24 January 2017. He made his first-class debut for Barbados in the 2016–17 Regional Four Day Competition on 23 March 2017. In October 2019, he was named in the West Indies Emerging Team for the 2019–20 Regional Super50 tournament.

In June 2020, Harding was named as one of eleven reserve players in the West Indies' Test squad, for their series against England. The Test series was originally scheduled to start in May 2020, but was moved back to July 2020 due to the COVID-19 pandemic. He made his Twenty20 debut on 5 September 2020, for the Barbados Tridents in the 2020 Caribbean Premier League.

In January 2021, Harding was added to the West Indies' One Day International (ODI) squad for their series against Bangladesh. He made his ODI debut for the West Indies, against Bangladesh, on 25 January 2021.
