= Patrick Harty =

West Indian cricketer (born 1991)

Personal information
- Full name: Patrick Marlon Harty
- Born: 29 January 1991 (age 35)

Career statistics
Competition	FC	LA
Matches	8	1
Runs scored	13	–
Batting average	2.16	–
100s/50s	0/0	–
Top score	7	–
Balls bowled	1,517	42
Wickets	22	1
Bowling average	32.22	28.00
5 wickets in innings	0	0
10 wickets in match	0	0
Best bowling	4/43	1/28
Catches/stumpings	1/–	1/–
- Source: Cricinfo, 10 January 2021

Patrick Harty (born 29 January 1991) is a West Indian cricketer. He made his first-class debut on 9 January 2020, for Jamaica in the 2019–20 West Indies Championship.
