= Nial Smith =

West Indian cricketer (born 1995)

Personal information
- Full name: Nial Smith
- Born: 22 October 1995 (age 31); Guyana
- Batting: Right handed
- Bowling: Right arm medium
- Role: Bowler

Domestic team information
- Years: Team
- 2019-present: Guyana
- 2021: Guyana Amazon Warriors (squad no. 46)

Career statistics
Competition	FC	LA	T20
Matches	7	7	2
Runs scored	47	2	-
Batting average	5.87	0.66	-
100s/50s	0/0	0/0	-/-
Top score	17	1*	-
Balls bowled	1,008	294	24
Wickets	20	9	0
Bowling average	29.30	22.22	-
5 wickets in innings	2	0	0
10 wickets in match	0	0	0
Best bowling	6/55	3/47	-/-
Catches/stumpings	3/–	0/–	0/–
- Source: Cricinfo, 21 January 2022

Nial Smith (born 22 October 1995) is a Guyanese cricketer. He made his List A debut on 11 November 2019, for Guyana in the 2019–20 Regional Super50 tournament. He made his first-class debut on 9 January 2020, for Guyana in the 2019–20 West Indies Championship. He made his Twenty20 debut on 28 August 2021, for the Guyana Amazon Warriors in the 2021 Caribbean Premier League.
