= Jamie Merchant =

Jamaican cricketer (born 1989)

Personal information
- Full name: Jamie Howinton Merchant
- Born: 13 July 1989 (age 37); Jamaica
- Batting: Right handed
- Bowling: Right arm offbreak

Career statistics
| Competition | FC | LA | T20 |
|---|---|---|---|
| Matches | 15 | 14 | 1 |
| Runs scored | 519 | 168 | 0 |
| Batting average | 23.59 | 16.80 | 0.00 |
| 100s/50s | 0/3 | 0/0 | 0/0 |
| Top score | 58 | 38 | 0 |
| Balls bowled | 2,698 | 642 | 18 |
| Wickets | 42 | 12 | 1 |
| Bowling average | 28.69 | 35.91 | 14.00 |
| 5 wickets in innings | 1 | 0 | 0 |
| 10 wickets in match | 0 | 0 | 0 |
| Best bowling | 5/72 | 4/35 | 1/14 |
| Catches/stumpings | 5/– | 5/– | 0/– |
- Source: Cricinfo, 5 August 2022

Jamie Merchant (born 13 July 1989) is a Jamaican cricketer. He made his List A debut for Jamaica in the 2018–19 Regional Super50 tournament on 12 October 2018. In October 2019, he was named in Jamaica's squad for the 2019–20 Regional Super50 tournament. In May 2022, in round three of the 2021–22 West Indies Championship, Merchant took his maiden five-wicket haul in first-class cricket, with 5/72 against the Windward Islands.
