= Preston McSween =

Grenadian cricketer

Personal information
- Full name: Preston Anthony Shaine McSween
- Born: 15 August 1995 (age 31); St Andrew's, Grenada
- Batting: Right-handed
- Bowling: Left-arm fast-medium

Domestic team information
- Years: Team
- 2016/17: Barbados
- 2019/20–: Windward Islands
- 2020: Jamaica Tallawahs
- 2022: St Lucia Kings

Career statistics
Competition	FC	LA	T20
Matches	18	13	2
Runs scored	295	82	–
Batting average	12.82	11.71	–
100s/50s	0/1	0/0	–
Top score	86	22	–
Balls bowled	3,041	594	24
Wickets	60	11	1
Bowling average	26.51	46.72	53.00
5 wickets in innings	5	0	0
10 wickets in match	0	0	0
Best bowling	6/64	2/46	1/39
Catches/stumpings	4/–	2/–	0/–
- Source: Cricinfo, 14 August 2024

Preston McSween (born 15 August 1995) is a Grenadian cricketer. He made his first-class debut for Barbados in the 2016–17 Regional Four Day Competition on 7 April 2017. In February 2020, in the 2019–20 West Indies Championship, he took his first five-wicket haul in first-class cricket.

In June 2020, McSween was named as one of eleven reserve players in the West Indies' Test squad, for their series against England. The Test series was originally scheduled to start in May 2020, but was moved back to July 2020 due to the COVID-19 pandemic.

In July 2020, he was named in the Jamaica Tallawahs squad for the 2020 Caribbean Premier League (CPL). He made his Twenty20 debut on 5 September 2020, for the Jamaica Tallawahs in the 2020 CPL. He made his List A debut on 7 February 2021, for the Windward Islands, in the 2020–21 Super50 Cup.
