= Veerasammy Permaul =

Guyanese cricketer

Personal information
- Born: 11 August 1989 (age 37); Albion, Guyana
- Batting: Right-handed
- Bowling: Slow left-arm orthodox
- Role: Bowler

International information
- National side: West Indies (2012–2022)
- Test debut (cap 293): 13 November 2012 v Bangladesh
- Last Test: 16 March 2022 v England
- ODI debut (cap 165): 5 December 2012 v Bangladesh
- Last ODI: 11 April 2017 v Pakistan
- ODI shirt no.: 94
- Only T20I (cap 72): 1 April 2018 v Pakistan
- T20I shirt no.: 94

Domestic team information
- Years: Team
- 2006–present: Guyana
- 2013–2019/2026: Guyana Amazon Warriors
- 2020–2021: Jamaica Tallawahs (squad no. 94)
- 2024: St Kitts and Nevis Patriots

Career statistics
Competition	Test	ODI	T20I	FC
Matches	9	7	1	151
Runs scored	145	19	0	2726
Batting average	13.18	6.33	–	15.06
100s/50s	0/0	0/0	0/0	0/7
Top score	26*	10	–	90*
Balls bowled	2114	331	3	34183
Wickets	31	8	0	668
Bowling average	38.16	33.87	–	20.88
5 wickets in innings	1	0	0	34
10 wickets in match	0	0	0	7
Best bowling	5/35	3/40	–	8/18
Catches/stumpings	4/–	1/–	0/–	78/–
- Source: CricInfo, 20 April 2025

Veerasammy Permaul (born 11 August 1989) is a Guyanese cricketer. He's featured as a left arm orthodox spinner for both Guyana and the West Indies cricket team. Permaul is also the leading wicket-taker in West Indian First-Class cricketing tournaments.

== Career ==
From Berbice, Permaul has played his club cricket with Community Centre Cricket Club since 2002. He made his first-class cricket debut for Guyana in the Regional Four Day Competition in 2006/07. In 2012 he captained the West Indies A team in a series at home against India A.

After being released at the end of the 2016 Caribbean Premier League season, he was reselected by the Guyana Amazon Warriors for the 2017 edition; he was picked in the 9th round of the draft.

In March 2017, he was named in the West Indies squad for the Twenty20 International (T20I) series against Pakistan.

In December 2017, he took his 25th five-wicket haul in first-class cricket, bowling for Guyana against the Leeward Islands in the 2017–18 Regional Four Day Competition. He finished the tournament as the leading wicket-taker, with 50 dismissals from 10 matches.

In March 2018, he was named in the West Indies squad for their Twenty20 International (T20I) series against Pakistan. He made his T20I debut for the West Indies against Pakistan on 1 April 2018. However, he injured himself during the match and was ruled out of the West Indies squad for the remaining two fixtures.

In October 2019, he was named in Guyana's squad for the 2019–20 Regional Super50 tournament. In February 2020, in the 2019–20 West Indies Championship fixture against Jamaica, Permaul took 15 wickets for 77 runs in the match. These were the second-best match figures in a domestic first-class match in the West Indies since 1966. He was the leading wicket-taker in the tournament, with fifty dismissals in eight matches.

In July 2020, he was named in the Jamaica Tallawahs squad for the 2020 Caribbean Premier League.
