= Jermaine Blackwood =

Jamaican cricketer

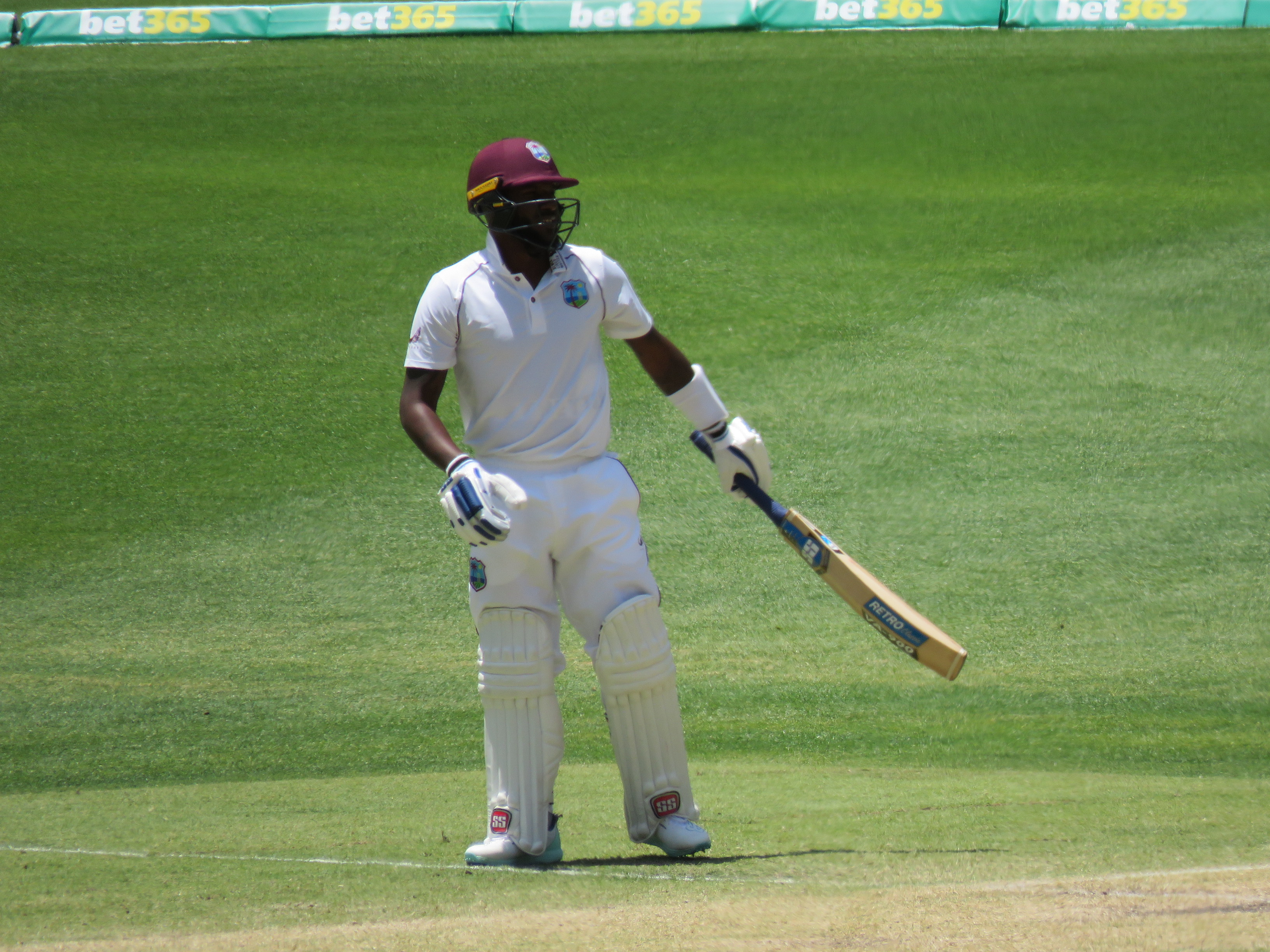
- Blackwood batting against Australia in December 2022

Personal information
- Born: 20 November 1991 (age 34); Jamaica
- Batting: Right-handed
- Bowling: Right arm off-break
- Role: Middle-order batter

International information
- National side: West Indies (2014–2023)
- Test debut (cap 298): 16 June 2014 v New Zealand
- Last Test: 8 March 2023 v South Africa
- ODI debut (cap 170): 4 November 2015 v Sri Lanka
- Last ODI: 17 August 2022 v New Zealand

Domestic team information
- Years: Team
- 2012–present: Jamaica
- 2013–2020: Jamaica Tallawahs
- 2022: Guyana Amazon Warriors

Career statistics
Competition	Test	ODI	FC	LA
Matches	56	3	137	69
Runs scored	2898	23	7910	1614
Batting average	30.18	11.5	32.82	26.03
100s/50s	3/18	0/0	8/52	3/7
Top score	112*	12*	248	119
Balls bowled	454	18	1708	90
Wickets	4	0	20	1
Bowling average	66.00	–	47.45	81.00
5 wickets in innings	0	–	0	0
10 wickets in match	0	–	0	0
Best bowling	2/14	–	3/39	1/38
Catches/stumpings	45/–	2/–	135/–	27/–
- Source: Cricinfo, 7 January 2024

Jermaine Blackwood (born 20 November 1991) is a Jamaican cricketer. He made his Test cricket debut for the West Indies against New Zealand in June 2014. He made his One Day International debut for the West Indies against Sri Lanka on 4 November 2015. He is vice-captain of West Indies test team.

Blackwood scored his maiden Test century in the first Test of England's 2015 tour, however, England went on to win the match. Blackwood then steered his team to victory in the third Test at Barbados hitting 53 not out with the winning runs coming off the bowling of Moeen Ali. The West Indies won by 5 wickets to draw the series 1–1.

In September 2019, in the second innings of the second Test against India, Blackwood replaced Darren Bravo as a concussion substitute in the West Indies' squad.

In October 2019, he was named in Jamaica's squad for the 2019–20 Regional Super50 tournament. In March 2020, in round eight of the 2019–20 West Indies Championship, Blackwood scored his maiden double century in first-class cricket, with 248 runs against the Leeward Islands. He was the leading run-scorer in the tournament, with 768 runs in eight matches.

In June 2020, Blackwood was named in the West Indies' Test squad, for their series against England. The Test series was originally scheduled to start in May 2020, but was moved back to July 2020 due to the COVID-19 pandemic. In the first Test of the series, at Southampton, Blackwood top-scored with a match winning 95, helping his team to win the match by four wickets.

In November 2020, Blackwood was named in West Indies's test squad against New Zealand. In the first test against New Zealand, he scored 104 and shared a 155 run stand with Alzarri Joseph, but could not help the West Indies to win the Test.
