= Nigel Duguid =

Cricket umpire

- Born: 25 November 1969 (age 56); Georgetown, Guyana
Nigel Duguid
Personal information
- Full name: Nigel Duguid
- Role: Umpire
Umpiring information
- Tests umpired: 1 (2022)
- ODIs umpired: 15 (2017–2023)
- T20Is umpired: 46 (2014–2024)
- WODIs umpired: 9 (2013–2022)
- WT20Is umpired: 17 (2011–2022)
- Source: Cricinfo, 19 August 2022

Nigel Duguid (born 25 November 1969) is a Guyanese cricket umpire. He made his Twenty20 International (T20I) umpiring debut in a match between the West Indies and Ireland on 21 February 2014. He officiated in his first One Day International (ODI) match between the West Indies and England on 5 March 2017.

He was one of the seventeen on-field umpires for the 2018 Under-19 Cricket World Cup. In January 2020, he was named as one of the sixteen umpires for the 2020 Under-19 Cricket World Cup tournament in South Africa.

Duguid made his debut as an on-field umpire in a Test match on 16 March 2022, in the second Test between the West Indies and England.

== See also ==
- List of Test cricket umpires
- List of One Day International cricket umpires
- List of Twenty20 International cricket umpires
