= Kieran Powell =

West Indian cricketer

Personal information
- Full name: Kieran Omar Akeem Powell
- Born: 6 March 1990 (age 36); Charlestown, Saint Kitts and Nevis
- Height: 6 ft 3 in (1.91 m)
- Batting: Left-handed
- Bowling: Right-arm medium; Right-arm off spin
- Role: Opening batsman

International information
- National side: West Indies
- Test debut (cap 292): 6 July 2011 v India
- Last Test: 20 August 2021 v Pakistan
- ODI debut (cap 152): 31 July 2009 v Bangladesh
- Last ODI: 9 December 2018 v Bangladesh
- ODI shirt no.: 23 (prev. 73)

Domestic team information
- Years: Team
- 2008–present: Leeward Islands
- 2013: Antigua Hawksbills (CPL)
- 2015–2016: Tamil Union
- 2017: St Kitts & Nevis Patriots (CPL)

Career statistics
Competition	Test	ODI	T20I
Matches	44	46	1
Runs scored	2,113	1,005	12
Batting average	25.76	22.84	12.00
100s/50s	3/7	0/9	0/0
Top score	134	83	12
Catches/stumpings	31/–	14/–	1/–
- Source: ESPNCricinfo, 24 August 2021

Kieran Omar Akeem Powell (born 6 March 1990) is a Nevisian sportsman who has played international cricket for the West Indies. He is a left-handed opening batsman.

Having represented the West Indies under-19s at the 2008 Under-19 World Cup, Powell made his first-class debut for the Leeward Islands in March 2008. He was selected to make his One Day International (ODI) debut for the West Indies in 2009, against Bangladesh, and made his Test debut just under two years later, against India. Powell scored his first Test century in July 2012, against New Zealand, and later in the year made centuries in both innings of a Test against Bangladesh, becoming one of the youngest to do so.

Powell was dropped from the West Indies team in June 2014, midway through a series against New Zealand. In December 2015, he announced that he would be attempting to switch from professional cricket to professional baseball, pursuing a contract with a Major League Baseball team. This switch did not come to fruition and in March 2017 Powell was recalled to the West Indies team.

== Early career ==
Powell was born in Charlestown, the largest town on the island of Nevis (one of the two constituent islands of Saint Kitts and Nevis). His father, Carlisle Powell, a former government minister, is one of Mel B's cousins. He lived in England from the ages of 14 to 16, where he attended Millfield School, an independent school in Somerset. While attending the school he played for their cricket team, and opened the batting with future England batsman Craig Kieswetter.

Having already played for the Leeward Islands at under-15 and under-19 level, Powell was chosen to represent his home island of Nevis in the inaugural Stanford 20/20 competition. On 14 July 2006, the 16-year-old Powell made his Twenty20 debut in the first round match against St Kitts, batting at number 3 and scored 26 runs from 16 deliveries as Nevis chased down the total. Powell was moved up to open the innings in the quarter-final match against Antigua and Barbuda, and scored 21 off 9 balls, setting a fast scoring pace to the innings which eventually totalled the highest of the tournament. In the semi-final against Trinidad and Tobago he was dismissed for a duck as the team was defeated by 74 runs.

Powell made his first List A appearances for the West Indies Under-19 in the 2007–08 KFC Cup. The team was playing in the competition as part of their preparation for the 2008 U/19 Cricket World Cup. Powell made his debut on 17 October 2007 against Barbados; it was a poor match for the under-19 team as they were dismissed for a record low total of 18, opening the batting Powell scored one run. Powell was dropped for the second group match but returned for the third and scored 2. In February 2008 the Under-19s made a short tour of Bangladesh in the lead up to the World Cup, Powell played in all three one-day matches against the home team scoring 44 runs from three innings.

Powell's form improved in the World Cup itself as he scored 253 runs at an average of 42.16, including three half-centuries. He was second highest scorer in the tournament behind India's Tanmay Srivastava. Cricket writer George Binoy wrote: "the way he took a step down to the fast bowlers and lofted them straight reminded one of Chris Gayle".

Powell finished the 2007–08 season by making his first-class debut for the Leeward Islands against Combined Campuses and Colleges in March 2008, he scored 85 in the first innings and 99 in the second, in the process winning the Man of the match award. Powell was a regular for the Leeward Islands in the 2008–09 WICB Cup, playing in all five group matches he scored 79 runs at 15.80. In July 2009 the West Indies players were in a dispute with the West Indies Cricket Board (WICB), so an understrength team took to the field. Amongst the players was Powell, one of several players who would make their international debut during the tour. On 31 July he played his maiden One Day International squad to face Bangladesh. Opening the batting with Andre Fletcher, Powell was dismissed from the first ball of the match, dismissed leg before wicket by Mahbubul Alam as the West Indies lost all three matches in the ODI series.

With the contract dispute still unresolved, the West Indies took their weakened squad to the Champions Trophy in September. Powell played a single match during the tournament, making five runs before he was out. He would not play another ODI for two years. When the players' dispute with the WICB was resolved in November, Powell was one of several players who were replaced by more experienced cricketers.

== International breakthrough ==
After his first taste of international cricket, Powell returned to play for the Leeward Islands but periodically represented West Indies A. His progress was hindered by an injury in 2011, but in July that year (two years after he was first called into the West Indies squad) Powell was selected to replace batsman Ramnaresh Sarwan for the third Test against India. At the time Powell averaged 38.91 from 23 first-class matches. Chris Gayle, who regularly opened the batting for the West Indies, was not playing at the time due to a dispute with the WICB, so on debut Powell joined Adrian Barath (who made his Test debut in 2011 and was similarly inexperienced) to open the West Indies innings. Powell managed scores of 3 and 4 while the match ended in a draw.

In October 2018, Cricket West Indies (CWI) awarded him a red-ball contract for the 2018–19 season.

== Switch to baseball ==
In December 2015, it was reported that Powell had been training in Florida in an attempt to make a career change from cricket to baseball and in hopes of making it in Major League Baseball. In January 2016, Powell worked out for the MLB's Milwaukee Brewers and New York Mets.

== Coaching career ==
In July 2019, he was appointed as the batting coach of the United States national cricket team on a short-term basis.
