= 2023 Caribbean Premier League =

Eleventh season of the Caribbean Premier League

- Dates: 16 August – 24 September 2023
- Administrator: CPL Limited
- Cricket format: Twenty20
- Tournament format(s): Round-robin and playoffs
- Hosts: Various: Barbados; Guyana; Saint Kitts and Nevis; Saint Lucia; Trinidad and Tobago
- Champions: Guyana Amazon Warriors (1st title)
- Runners-up: Trinbago Knight Riders
- Participants: 6
- Matches: 34
- Player of the series: Shai Hope (Guyana Amazon Warriors)
- Most runs: Shai Hope (481) (Guyana Amazon Warriors)
- Most wickets: Dwaine Pretorius (20) (Guyana Amazon Warriors)
- Official website: cplt20.com

The 2023 Caribbean Premier League (CPLT20) or for sponsorship reasons, Republic Bank CPL 2023 was the eleventh season of the Caribbean Premier League, the domestic Twenty20 cricket league that was played in the West Indies. The tournament was played from 16 August with final on 24 September 2023. The matches were played across five countries in the Caribbean: Trinidad and Tobago, Saint Kitts and Nevis, Guyana, Barbados, and Saint Lucia. The fixtures for the tournament were confirmed in April 2023. Jamaica Tallawahs were the defending champions.

In the final, Guyana Amazon Warriors defeated Trinbago Knight Riders by 9 wickets to win their first title.

== Teams ==
| Team | Captain | Coach |
|---|---|---|
| Barbados Royals | Rovman Powell | Trevor Penney |
| Guyana Amazon Warriors | Imran Tahir | Lance Klusener |
| Jamaica Tallawahs | Brandon King | Shivnarine Chanderpaul |
| St Kitts & Nevis Patriots | Evin Lewis | Simon Helmot |
| Saint Lucia Kings | Sikandar Raza | Daren Sammy |
| Trinbago Knight Riders | Kieron Pollard | Phil Simmons |

== Squads ==
The following players were retained or signed by their respective teams for the tournament.

| Barbados Royals | Guyana Amazon Warriors | Jamaica Tallawahs | St Kitts & Nevis Patriots | Saint Lucia Kings | Trinbago Knight Riders |
|---|---|---|---|---|---|
| Rovman Powell (c); Jason Holder; Kyle Mayers; ~~Maheesh Theekshana~~; Qais Ahmed; ~~Rassie van der Dussen~~; Laurie Evans; Alick Athanaze; Obed McCoy; Kevin Wickham; Roelof van der Merwe; Akeem Jordan; Rahkeem Cornwall; Donovan Ferreira; Justin Greaves; Joshua Bishop; Nyeem Young; Rivaldo Clarke; Ramon Simmonds | Imran Tahir (c); Shimron Hetmyer; ~~Rahmanullah Gurbaz~~; Mohammad Haris; Odean Smith; Romario Shepherd; Azam Khan; Shai Hope; Saim Ayub; Gudakesh Motie; Dwaine Pretorius; Kevin Sinclair; Keemo Paul; Chandrapaul Hemraj; Ronsford Beaton; Kevlon Anderson; Shamar Joseph; Matthew Nandu; Junior Sinclair | Brandon King (c); Imad Wasim; Fabian Allen; Alex Hales; Mohammad Amir; Naveen ul Haq; Chris Green; Ben Cutting; Jermaine Blackwood; Shamarh Brooks; Hayden Walsh Jr.; Raymon Reifer; Amir Jangoo; Steven Taylor; Shamar Springer; Nicholson Gordon; Kirk McKenzie; Joshua James | Evin Lewis (c); Tristan Stubbs; Andre Fletcher; Sherfane Rutherford; Dominic Drakes; Sheldon Cottrell; George Linde; Yannic Cariah; Oshane Thomas; Corbin Bosch; Dewald Brevis; Jyd Goolie; Izharulhaq Naveed; Kofi James; Joshua Da Silva; Ashmead Nedd; Johann Layne; Ambati Rayudu; Blessing Muzarabani | Faf du Plessis (c); Johnson Charles; Dasun Shanaka; Alzarri Joseph; Roston Chase; Jair McAllister; Sikandar Raza; Peter Hatzoglou; Bhanuka Rajapaksa; Roshon Primus; Jeavor Royal; Shadrack Descarte; Khary Pierre; Leonardo Julien; Matthew Forde; Kimani Melius; McKenny Clarke; Chris Sole; Sean Williams | Kieron Pollard (c); Andre Russell; Sunil Narine; Nicholas Pooran; ~~Rilee Rossouw~~; Lorcan Tucker; Tim David; Akeal Hosein; Dwayne Bravo; Martin Guptill; Noor Ahmad; Tom Curran; ~~Matheesha Pathirana~~; Jayden Seales; Mark Deyal; Chadwick Walton; Terrance Hinds; Kadeem Alleyne; Jaden Carmichael; Waqar Salamkhiel |

== Points table ==
| Pos | Team | Pld | W | L | NR | Pts | NRR |
|---|---|---|---|---|---|---|---|
| 1 | Guyana Amazon Warriors (C) | 10 | 8 | 1 | 1 | 17 | 1.725 |
| 2 | Trinbago Knight Riders (R) | 10 | 6 | 3 | 1 | 13 | 0.903 |
| 3 | Saint Lucia Kings | 10 | 4 | 4 | 2 | 10 | 0.471 |
| 4 | Jamaica Tallawahs | 10 | 4 | 5 | 1 | 9 | 0.788 |
| 5 | Barbados Royals | 10 | 3 | 6 | 1 | 7 | −2.050 |
| 6 | St Kitts & Nevis Patriots | 10 | 1 | 7 | 2 | 4 | −2.020 |

Source: CricInfo
(C) Champions; (R) Runners-up
- The top four teams will advance to the Playoffs
- advance to the Qualifier 1
- advance to the Eliminator

== League stage ==
=== Phase 1 (Saint Lucia) ===
16 August 2023
19:00 (N)
Scorecard

| Jamaica Tallawahs; 187 (20 overs) | v | Saint Lucia Kings; 176/8 (20 Overs) |
| Brandon King 81 (53); Roston Chase 3/39 (4 overs) | | Roston Chase 53 (31); Imad Wasim 3/27 (4 overs) |

Jamaica Tallawahs won by 11 runs
Daren Sammy Cricket Ground, Gros Islet
Umpires: Gregory Brathwaite (WI) and Patrick Gustard (WI)
Player of the match: Brandon King (Jamaica Tallawahs)

- Saint Lucia Kings won the toss and elected to field.

17 August 2023
19:00 (N)
Scorecard

| Saint Lucia Kings; 201/6 (20 overs) | v | Barbados Royals; 147 (20 Overs) |
| Sean Williams 47 (30); Jason Holder 4/38 (4 overs) | | Nyeem Young 48 (39); Matthew Forde 3/12 (3 overs) |

St Lucia Kings won by 54 runs
Daren Sammy Cricket Ground, Gros Islet
Umpires: Nigel Duguid (WI) and Leslie Reifer (WI)
Player of the match: Matthew Forde (St Lucia Kings)

- Saint Lucia Kings won the toss and elected to bat.
- Kevin Wickham (Barbados Royals) and Shadrack Descarte (Saint Lucia Kings) both made their T20 debuts.

19 August 2023
10:00
Scorecard

| Trinbago Knight Riders; 19/1 (3 overs) | v | St Kitts & Nevis Patriots |
| Martin Guptill 11 (15); Sheldon Cottrell 1/10 (2 overs) |

No result
Daren Sammy Cricket Ground, Gros Islet
Umpires: Patrick Gustard (WI) and Carl Tuckett (WI)

- St Kitts & Nevis Patriots won the toss and elected to field.
- No further play was possible due to rain.

19 August 2023
19:00 (N)
Scorecard

| Guyana Amazon Warriors; 56/2 (5 overs) | v | Saint Lucia Kings |
| Saim Ayub 24* (16); Jair McAllister 1/7 (1 over) |

No result
Daren Sammy Cricket Ground, Gros Islet
Umpires: Leslie Reifer (WI) and Chris Wright (WI)

- Saint Lucia Kings won the toss and elected to field.
- No further play was possible due to rain.

20 August 2023
10:00
Scorecard

| Jamaica Tallawahs | v | Barbados Royals |

Match abandoned
Daren Sammy Cricket Ground, Gros Islet
Umpires: Zahid Bassarath (WI) and Gregory Brathwaite (WI)

- No toss.
- No play was possible due to rain.

20 August 2023
19:00 (N)
Scorecard

| Saint Lucia Kings | v | St Kitts and Nevis Patriots |

Match abandoned
Daren Sammy Cricket Ground, Gros Islet
Umpires: Deighton Butler (WI) and Nigel Duguid (WI)

- No toss.
- No play was possible due to rain.

=== Phase 2 (Saint Kitts) ===
23 August 2023
19:00 (N)
Scorecard

| St Kitts and Nevis Patriots; 156/9 (20 overs) | v | Jamaica Tallawahs; 157/2 (16.3 overs) |
| Joshua Da Silva 36 (32); Salman Irshad 4/27 (4 Overs) | | Brandon King 67 (33); Oshane Thomas 1/25 (4 Overs) |

Jamaica Tallawahs won by 8 wickets
Warner Park Stadium, Saint Kitts
Umpires: Deighton Butler (WI) and Chris Wright (WI)
Player of the match: Salman Irshad (Jamaica Tallawahs)

- Jamaica Tallawahs won the toss and elected to field.

24 August 2023
19:00 (N)
Scorecard

| Guyana Amazon Warriors; 197/7 (20 overs) | v | St Kitts and Nevis Patriots; 132 (16.5 overs) |
| Shai Hope 54 (32); Oshane Thomas 3/38 (4 overs) | | Evin Lewis 48 (24); Gudakesh Motie 4/29 (4 overs) |

Guyana Amazon Warriors won by 65 runs
Warner Park Stadium, Saint Kitts
Umpires: Zahid Bassarath (WI) and Carl Tuckett (WI)
Player of the match: Gudakesh Motie (Guyana Amazon Warriors)

- St Kitts and Nevis Patriots won the toss and elected to field.
- Kofi James (St Kitts and Nevis Patriots) made his T20 debut.

26 August 2023
10:00
Scorecard

| Saint Lucia Kings; 167/5 (20 overs) | v | Trinbago Knight Riders; 113 (14.5 overs) |
| Faf du Plessis 57 (36); Andre Russell 2/28 (3 overs) | | Kieron Pollard 34 (15); Khary Pierre 4/20 (3.5 overs) |

Saint Lucia Kings won by 54 runs
Warner Park Stadium, Saint Kitts
Umpires: Leslie Reifer (WI) and Christopher Wright (Eng)
Player of the match: Sikandar Raza (Saint Lucia Kings)

- Trinbago Knight Riders won the toss and elected to field.
- McKenny Clarke (Saint Lucia Kings) made his T20 debut.

26 August 2023
19:00 (N)
Scorecard

| St Kitts and Nevis Patriots; 197/6 (20 overs) | v | Barbados Royals; 200/4 (18.3 overs) |
| Andre Fletcher 51 (38); Qais Ahmad 2/16 (4 overs) | | Rovman Powell 67* (29); Dominic Drakes 2/37 (3 overs) |

Barbados Royals won by 6 wickets
Warner Park Stadium, Saint Kitts
Umpires: Patrick Gustard (WI) and Carl Tuckett (WI)
Player of the match: Qais Ahmad (Barbados Royals)

- Barbados Royals won the toss and elected to field.
- Alick Athanaze (Barbados Royals) and Jyd Goolie (St Kitts and Nevis Patriots) both made their T20 debuts.

27 August 2023
10:00
Scorecard

| Guyana Amazon Warriors; 210/7 (20 overs) | v | Jamaica Tallawahs; 176 (18.4 overs) |
| Shimron Hetmyer 60 (45); Mohammad Amir 3/33 (4 overs) | | Imad Wasim 63 (36); Romario Shepherd 3/7 (3 overs) |

Guyana Amazon Warriors won by 34 runs
Warner Park Stadium, Saint Kitts
Umpires: Deighton Butler (WI) and Nigel Duguid (WI)
Player of the match: Romario Shepherd (Guyana Amazon Warriors)

- Jamaica Tallawahs won the toss and elected to field.

27 August 2023
19:00 (N)
Scorecard

| St Kitts and Nevis Patriots; 178/5 (20 overs) | v | Trinbago Knight Riders; 180/4 (17.1 overs) |
| Sherfane Rutherford 62* (38); Sunil Narine 3/24 (4 overs) | | Nicholas Pooran 61 (32); Corbin Bosch 3/22 (3 overs) |

Trinbago Knight Riders won by 6 wickets
Warner Park Stadium, Saint Kitts
Umpires: Zahid Bassarath (WI) and Gregory Brathwaite (WI)
Player of the match: Nicholas Pooran (Trinbago Knight Riders)

- Trinbago Knight Riders won the toss and elected to field.

=== Phase 3 (Barbados) ===
30 August 2023
19:00 (N)
Scorecard

| Trinbago Knight Riders; 194/5 (20 overs) | v | Barbados Royals; 61 (12.1 overs) |
| Martin Guptill 100* (58); Jason Holder 2/39 (4 overs) | | Jason Holder 14 (15); Waqar Salamkheil 4/14 (3.1 overs) |

Trinbago Knight Riders won by 133 runs
Kensington Oval, Bridgetown
Umpires: Zahid Bassarath (WI) and Patrick Gustard (WI)
Player of the match: Martin Guptill (Trinbago Knight Riders)

- Barbados Royals won the toss and elected to field.

31 August 2023
19:00 (N)
Scorecard

| Jamaica Tallawahs; 160/7 (20 overs) | v | Barbados Royals; 161/4 (19 overs) |
| Shamarh Brooks 78 (41); Jason Holder 2/19 (4 overs) | | Alick Athanaze 76 (48); Chris Green 2/21 (4 overs) |

Barbados Royals won by 6 wickets
Kensington Oval, Bridgetown
Umpires: Deighton Butler (WI) and Leslie Reifer (WI)
Player of the match: Alick Athanaze (Barbados Royals)

- Barbados Royals won the toss and elected to field.

2 September 2023
10:00
Scorecard

| Guyana Amazon Warriors; 186/6 (20 overs) | v | St Kitts & Nevis Patriots; 88 (17.1 overs) |
| Keemo Paul 41* (31); Oshane Thomas 3/26 (3 overs) | | Corbin Bosch 27 (27); Dwaine Pretorius 3/17 (3 overs) |

Guyana Amazon Warriors won by 98 runs
Kensington Oval, Bridgetown
Umpires: Gregory Brathwaite (WI) and Carl Tuckett (WI)
Player of the match: Dwaine Pretorius (Guyana Amazon Warriors)

- St Kitts and Nevis Patriots won the toss and elected to field.
- Johann Layne (St Kitts and Nevis Patriots) made his T20 debut.

2 September 2023
20:00 (N)
Scorecard

| Saint Lucia Kings; 195/6 (20 overs) | v | Barbados Royals; 105 (17.3 overs) |
| Johnson Charles 78 (52); Roelof van der Merwe 3/40 (4 overs) | | Nyeem Young 20 (31); Alzarri Joseph 3/7 (2.3 overs) |

Saint Lucia Kings won by 90 runs
Kensington Oval, Bridgetown
Umpires: Nigel Duguid (WI) and Chris Wright (WI)
Player of the match: Johnson Charles (Saint Lucia Kings)

- Barbados Royals won the toss and elected to field.

3 September 2023
10:00
Scorecard

| Trinbago Knight Riders; 142/8 (20 overs) | v | Jamaica Tallawahs; 140/7 (20 overs) |
| Kieron Pollard 33 (27); Mohammad Amir 3/20 (4 overs) | | Brandon King 36 (25); Andre Russell 3/34 (4 overs) |

Trinbago Knight Riders won by 2 runs
Kensington Oval, Bridgetown
Umpires: Zahid Bassarath (WI) and Patrick Gustard (WI)
Player of the match: Waqar Salamkheil (Trinbago Knight Riders)

- Jamaica Tallawahs won the toss and elected to field.
- Kelvin Pitman (Jamaica Tallawahs) made his T20 debut.

3 September 2023
20:00 (N)
Scorecard

| St Kitts and Nevis Patriots; 220/4 (20 overs) | v | Barbados Royals; 223/2 (18.1 overs) |
| Sherfane Rutherford 65* (27); Rahkeem Cornwall 2/27 (3 overs) | | Rahkeem Cornwall 102* (48); Corbin Bosch 1/29 (3 overs) |

Barbados Royals won by 8 wickets
Kensington Oval, Bridgetown
Umpires: Deighton Butler (WI) and Leslie Reifer (WI)
Player of the match: Rahkeem Cornwall (Barbados Royals)

- St Kitts and Nevis Patriots won the toss and elected to bat.

=== Phase 4 (Trinidad) ===
5 September 2023
19:00 (N)
Scorecard

| Trinbago Knight Riders; 172/8 (20 overs) | v | Guyana Amazon Warriors; 175/4 (19.1 overs) |
| Akeal Hosein 44* (35); Odean Smith 3/31 (4 overs) | | Saim Ayub 62 (43); Andre Russell 2/29 (3.1 overs) |

Guyana Amazon Warriors won by 6 wickets
Queen's Park Oval, Port of Spain
Umpires: Nigel Duguid (WI) and Chris Wright (WI)
Player of the match: Saim Ayub (Guyana Amazon Warriors)

- Guyana Amazon Warriors won the toss and elected to field.

6 September 2023
19:00 (N)
Scorecard

| Trinbago Knight Riders; 208/6 (20 overs) | v | Barbados Royals; 166/7 (20 overs) |
| Nicholas Pooran 102* (53); Jason Holder 2/39 (4 overs) | | Kyle Mayers 70 (45); Waqar Salamkheil 2/18 (4 overs) |

Trinbago Knight Riders won by 42 runs
Queen's Park Oval, Port of Spain
Umpires: Gregory Brathwaite (WI) and Carl Tuckett (WI)
Player of the match: Nicholas Pooran (Trinbago Knight Riders)

- Barbados Royals won the toss and elected to field.

9 September 2023
10:00
Scorecard

| Saint Lucia Kings; 149/7 (20 overs) | v | St Kitts and Nevis Patriots; 150/6 (19.5 overs) |
| Shadrack Descarte 43 (31); Ashmead Nedd 2/14 (4 overs) | | Andre Fletcher 93* (64); Khary Pierre 2/18 (4 overs) |

St Kitts and Nevis Patriots won by 4 wickets
Brian Lara Cricket Academy, San Fernando
Umpires: Deighton Butler (WI) and Nigel Duguid (WI)
Player of the match: Andre Fletcher (St Kitts and Nevis Patriots)

- St Kitts and Nevis Patriots won the toss and elected to field.

9 September 2023
20:00 (N)
Scorecard

| Jamaica Tallawahs; 154/8 (20 overs) | v | Trinbago Knight Riders; 155/3 (17.2 overs) |
| Imad Wasim 62 (33); Ali Khan 3/27 (3 overs) | | Nicholas Pooran 54 (35); Imad Wasim 2/28 (3 overs) |

Trinbago Knight Riders won by 7 wickets
Brian Lara Cricket Academy, San Fernando
Umpires: Zahid Bassarath (WI) and Patrick Gustard (WI)
Player of the match: Sunil Narine (Trinbago Knight Riders)

- Trinbago Knight Riders won the toss and elected to field.

10 September 2023
10:00
Scorecard

| Guyana Amazon Warriors; 181/9 (20 overs) | v | Barbados Royals; 178/8 (20 overs) |
| Saim Ayub 58 (35); Carlos Brathwaite 4/27 (4 overs) | | Laurie Evans 44 (27); Dwaine Pretorius 2/24 (4 overs) |

Guyana Amazon Warriors won by 3 runs
Brian Lara Cricket Academy, San Fernando
Umpires: Leslie Reifer (WI) and Chris Wright (WI)
Player of the match: Saim Ayub (Guyana Amazon Warriors)

- Guyana Amazon Warriors won the toss and elected to bat.

10 September 2023
20:00 (N)
Scorecard

| Saint Lucia Kings; 167/3 (20 overs) | v | Trinbago Knight Riders; 169/3 (18.5 overs) |
| Colin Munro 72* (51); Waqar Salamkheil 1/23 (4 overs); Jayden Seales 1/23 (3 overs) | | Mark Deyal 57 (45); Alzarri Joseph 2/42 (3.5 overs) |

Trinbago Knight Riders won by 7 wickets
Brian Lara Cricket Academy, San Fernando
Umpires: Gregory Brathwaite (WI) and Carl Tuckett (WI)
Player of the match: Mark Deyal (Trinbago Knight Riders)

- Trinbago Knight Riders won the toss and elected to field.

=== Phase 5 (Guyana) ===
13 September 2023
19:00 (N)
Scorecard

| Jamaica Tallawahs; 152/5 (20 overs) | v | Guyana Amazon Warriors; 155/3 (18.3 overs) |
| Brandon King 52 (32); Dwaine Pretorius 2/33 (4 overs) | | Saim Ayub 85 (53); Shamar Springer 1/23 (4 overs) |

Guyana Amazon Warriors won by 7 wickets
Providence Stadium, Guyana
Umpires: Zahid Bassarath (WI) and Patrick Gustard (WI)
Player of the match: Saim Ayub (Guyana Amazon Warriors)

- Guyana Amazon Warriors won the toss and elected to field.

14 September 2023
19:00 (N)
Scorecard

| Guyana Amazon Warriors; 167/5 (20 overs) | v | Saint Lucia Kings; 170/3 (17.3 overs) |
| Azam Khan 40 (25); Alzarri Joseph 2/31 (4 overs) | | Bhanuka Rajapaksa 86 (49); Romario Shepherd 1/15 (2 overs) |

Saint Lucia Kings won by 7 wickets
Providence Stadium, Guyana
Umpires: Deighton Butler (WI) and Leslie Reifer (WI)
Player of the match: Bhanuka Rajapaksa (Saint Lucia Kings)

- Guyana Amazon Warriors won the toss and elected to bat.

16 September 2023
10:00
Scorecard

| Jamaica Tallawahs; 178/7 (20 overs) | v | St Kitts and Nevis Patriots; 119 (17.3 overs) |
| Shamar Springer 38 (27); Ashmead Nedd 2/25 (3 overs) | | Yannic Cariah 65 (40); Mohammad Amir 4/19 (3.3 overs) |

Jamaica Tallawahs won by 59 runs
Providence Stadium, Guyana
Umpires: Gregory Brathwaite (WI) and Patrick Gustard (WI)
Player of the match: Shamar Springer (Jamaica Tallawahs)

- Jamaica Tallawahs won the toss and elected to bat.

16 September 2023
19:00 (N)
Scorecard

| Trinbago Knight Riders; 176/8 (20 overs) | v | Guyana Amazon Warriors; 177/4 (18.2 overs) |
| Keacy Carty 83 (49); Imran Tahir 3/12 (4 overs) | | Shai Hope 54* (37); Mark Deyal 1/21 (2 overs) |

Guyana Amazon Warriors won by 6 wickets
Providence Stadium, Guyana
Umpires: Nigel Duguid (WI) and Leslie Reifer (WI)
Player of the match: Imran Tahir (Guyana Amazon Warriors)

- Guyana Amazon Warriors won the toss and elected to field.

17 September 2023
10:00
Scorecard

| Jamaica Tallawahs; 201/5 (20 overs) | v | Saint Lucia Kings; 79 (15 overs) |
| Alex Hales 119* (57); Roston Chase 2/33 (3 overs) | | Bhanuka Rajapaksa 22 (15); Chris Green 4/15 (4 overs) |

Jamaica Tallawahs won by 122 runs
Providence Stadium, Guyana
Umpires: Patrick Gustard (WI) and Carl Tuckett (WI)
Player of the match: Alex Hales (Jamaica Tallawahs)

- Saint Lucia Kings won the toss and elected to field.

17 September 2023
19:00 (N)
Scorecard

| Guyana Amazon Warriors; 226/7 (20 overs) | v | Barbados Royals; 138/6 (20 overs) |
| Shai Hope 106 (44); Obed McCoy 2/36 (4 overs) | | Rivaldo Clarke 54* (43); Imran Tahir 3/23 (4 overs) |

Guyana Amazon Warriors won by 88 runs
Providence Stadium, Guyana
Umpires: Nigel Duguid (WI) and Chris Wright (WI)
Player of the match: Shai Hope (Guyana Amazon Warriors)

- Barbados Royals won the toss and elected to field.

== Playoffs ==
Qualifier 1 and Eliminator
19 September 2023 — Guyana
1 | Guyana Amazon Warriors | 166/7 (20 overs)
2 | Trinbago Knight Riders | 167/3 (18.1 overs)
20 September 2023 — Guyana
3 | Saint Lucia Kings | 125/9 (20 overs)
4 | Jamaica Tallawahs | 126/5 (17.2 overs)

Qualifier 2
22 September 2023 — Guyana
1 | Guyana Amazon Warriors | 182/6 (20 overs)
4 | Jamaica Tallawahs | 101 (15.2 overs)

Final
24 September 2023 — Guyana
2 | Trinbago Knight Riders | 94 (18.1 overs)
1 | Guyana Amazon Warriors | 99/1 (14 overs)

=== Eliminator ===
19 September 2023
19:00 (N)
Scorecard

| Saint Lucia Kings; 125/9 (20 overs) | v | Jamaica Tallawahs; 126/5 (17.2 overs) |
| Roston Chase 40 (36); Fabian Allen 4/25 (4 overs) | | Brandon King 30 (19); Matthew Forde 4/23 (4 overs) |

Jamaica Tallawahs won by 5 wickets
Providence Stadium, Guyana
Umpires: Gregory Brathwaite (WI) and Patrick Gustard (WI)
Player of the match: Fabian Allen (Jamaica Tallawahs)

- Jamaica Tallawahs won the toss and elected to field.

=== Qualifier 1 ===
20 September 2023
19:00 (N)
Scorecard

| Guyana Amazon Warriors; 166/7 (20 overs) | v | Trinbago Knight Riders; 167/3 (18.1 overs) |
| Saim Ayub 49 (39); Waqar Salamkheil 2/28 (4 overs) | | Chadwick Walton 80* (57); Dwaine Pretorius 2/36 (4 overs) |

Trinbago Knight Riders won by 7 wickets
Providence Stadium, Guyana
Umpires: Deighton Butler (WI) and Nigel Duguid (WI)
Player of the match: Chadwick Walton (Trinbago Knight Riders)

- Trinbago Knight Riders won the toss and elected to field.

=== Qualifier 2 ===
22 September 2023
19:00 (N)
Scorecard

| Guyana Amazon Warriors; 182/6 (20 overs) | v | Jamaica Tallawahs; 101 (15.2 overs) |
| Azam Khan 54 (27); Nicholson Gordon 2/27 (4 overs) | | Imad Wasim 43* (33); Imran Tahir 3/7 (2.2 overs) |

Guyana Amazon Warriors won by 81 runs
Providence Stadium, Guyana
Umpires: Gregory Brathwaite (WI) and Chris Wright (WI)
Player of the match: Dwaine Pretorius (Guyana Amazon Warriors)

- Jamaica Tallawahs won the toss and elected to field.

=== Final ===
24 September 2023
19:00 (N)
Scorecard

| Trinbago Knight Riders; 94 (18.1 overs) | v | Guyana Amazon Warriors; 99/1 (14 overs) |
| Keacy Carty 38 (45); Dwaine Pretorius 4/26 (4 overs) | | Saim Ayub 52* (41); Akeal Hosein 1/21 (4 overs) |

Guyana Amazon Warriors won by 9 wickets
Providence Stadium, Guyana
Umpires: Deighton Butler (WI) and Patrick Gustard (WI)
Player of the match: Dwaine Pretorius (Guyana Amazon Warriors)

- Guyana Amazon Warriors won the toss and elected to field.

== Statistics ==
=== Most runs ===
- Source: ESPNCricinfo

| Player | Team | Matches | Runs | High Score |
|---|---|---|---|---|
| Shai Hope | Guyana Amazon Warriors | 13 | 481 | 106 |
| Saim Ayub | Guyana Amazon Warriors | 13 | 478 | 85 |
| Imad Wasim | Jamaica Tallawahs | 11 | 313 | 63 |
| Nicholas Pooran | Trinbago Knight Riders | 11 | 291 | 102* |
| Brandon King | Jamaica Tallawahs | 10 | 288 | 81 |

=== Most wickets ===
- Source: ESPNCricinfo

| Player | Team | Matches | Wickets | Best bowling |
|---|---|---|---|---|
| Dwaine Pretorius | Guyana Amazon Warriors | 13 | 20 | 4/26 |
| Imran Tahir | Guyana Amazon Warriors | 13 | 18 | 3/7 |
| Imad Wasim | Jamaica Tallawahs | 10 | 16 | 4/19 |
| Jason Holder | Barbados Royals | 9 | 16 | 4/38 |
| Mohammad Amir | Jamaica Tallawahs | 11 | 15 | 4/15 |
