= West Indian cricket team in Bangladesh in 2025–26 =

International cricket tour

	Bangladesh	West Indies
- Dates: 18 – 31 October 2025
Captains	Mehidy Hasan Miraz (ODIs); Litton Das (T20Is)	Shai Hope

One Day International series
- Results: Bangladesh won the 3-match series 2–1
Most runs	Soumya Sarkar (140)	Shai Hope (72)
Most wickets	Rishad Hossain (12)	Akeal Hosein (6)
- Player of the series: Rishad Hossain (Ban)

Twenty20 International series
- Results: West Indies won the 3-match series 3–0
Most runs	Tanzid Hasan (165)	Shai Hope (101)
Most wickets	Rishad Hossain (6)	Jason Holder (7); Romario Shepherd (7)
- Player of the series: Romario Shepherd (WI)

The West Indies cricket team toured Bangladesh in October 2025 to play the Bangladesh cricket team. The tour consisted of three One Day International (ODI) and three Twenty20 International (T20I) matches. In September 2025, the Bangladesh Cricket Board (BCB) confirmed the fixtures for the tour, as a part of the 2025–26 home international season.

== Squads ==
Bangladesh		West Indies	
ODIs	T20Is	ODIs	T20Is
Mehidy Hasan Miraz (c); Nasum Ahmed (Note: In squad for second and third ODI only.); Taskin Ahmed; Jaker Ali (wk); Mahidul Islam Ankon (wk); Nurul Hasan (wk); Tanzid Hasan; Saif Hassan; Rishad Hossain; Shamim Hossain; Towhid Hridoy; Tanvir Islam; Hasan Mahmud; Mustafizur Rahman; Soumya Sarkar; Tanzim Hasan Sakib; Najmul Hossain Shanto	Litton Das (c, wk); Nasum Ahmed; Taskin Ahmed; Jaker Ali; Parvez Hossain Emon; Mahedi Hasan; Nurul Hasan (wk); Tanzid Hasan; Saif Hassan; Rishad Hossain; Shamim Hossain; Towhid Hridoy; Shoriful Islam; Mustafizur Rahman; Tanzim Hasan Sakib	Shai Hope (c, wk); Alick Athanaze; Ackeem Auguste; ~~Jediah Blades~~; Keacy Carty; Roston Chase; Justin Greaves; Akeal Hosein; Amir Jangoo (wk); ~~Shamar Joseph~~; Brandon King; Gudakesh Motie; Khary Pierre; Sherfane Rutherford; Jayden Seales; Romario Shepherd; Ramon Simmonds	Shai Hope (c, wk); Alick Athanaze; Ackeem Auguste; Roston Chase; Jason Holder; Akeal Hosein; Amir Jangoo (wk); Shamar Joseph; Brandon King; Gudakesh Motie; Rovman Powell; Sherfane Rutherford; Jayden Seales; Romario Shepherd; Ramon Simmonds

On 19 October, Bangladesh Cricket Board (BCB) added Nasum Ahmed to the ODI squad.

On 20 October, Shamar Joseph (discomfort in his shoulder) and Jediah Blades (stress fracture of the lower back) were ruled out of the ODI series. They were replaced by Akeal Hosein and Ramon Simmonds.

== ODI series ==
=== 1st ODI ===
18 October 2025
13:30 (D/N)
Scorecard

Bangladesh; 207 (49.4 overs)	v	West Indies; 133 (39 overs)
Tawhid Hridoy 51 (90); Jayden Seales 3/48 (7 overs)		Brandon King 44 (60); Rishad Hossain 6/35 (9 overs)

Bangladesh won by 74 runs
Sher-e-Bangla National Cricket Stadium, Dhaka
Umpires: Jayaraman Madanagopal (Ind) and Gazi Sohel (Ban)
Player of the match: Rishad Hossain (Ban)

- West Indies won the toss and elected to field.
- Mahidul Islam Ankon (Ban) made his ODI debut.
- Rishad Hossain (Ban) took his maiden five-wicket haul in ODIs.

=== 2nd ODI ===
21 October 2025
13:30 (D/N)
Scorecard

Bangladesh; 213/7 (50 overs)	v	West Indies; 213/9 (50 overs)
Soumya Sarkar 45 (89); Gudakesh Motie 3/65 (10 overs)		Shai Hope 53* (67); Rishad Hossain 3/42 (10 overs)

Match tied
(West Indies won the Super Over)
Sher-e-Bangla National Cricket Stadium, Dhaka
Umpires: Tanvir Ahmed (Ban) and Chris Gaffaney (NZ)
Player of the match: Shai Hope (WI)

- Bangladesh won the toss and elected to bat.
- Ackeem Auguste (WI) made his ODI debut.
- During Bangladesh's innings, all the 50 overs were bowled by the West Indian spinners, the first time in the history of ODIs.
- This was the first ever tied match featuring Bangladesh in their history of 814 international matches.
- Super Over: West Indies 10/1, Bangladesh 9/1

=== 3rd ODI ===
23 October 2025
13:30 (D/N)
Scorecard

Bangladesh; 296/8 (50 overs)	v	West Indies; 117 (30.1 overs)
Soumya Sarkar 91 (86); Akeal Hosein 4/41 (10 overs)		Akeal Hosein 27 (15); Nasum Ahmed 3/11 (6 overs)

Bangladesh won by 179 runs
Sher-e-Bangla National Cricket Stadium, Dhaka
Umpires: Jayaraman Madanagopal (Ind) and Masudur Rahman (Ban)
Player of the match: Soumya Sarkar (Ban)

- Bangladesh won the toss and elected to bat.

== T20I series ==
=== 1st T20I ===
27 October 2025
18:00 (N)
Scorecard

West Indies; 165/3 (20 overs)	v	Bangladesh; 149 (19.4 overs)
Shai Hope 46* (28); Taskin Ahmed 2/36 (4 overs)		Tanzim Hasan Sakib 33 (27); Jason Holder 3/31 (4 overs)

West Indies won by 16 runs
Bir Shrestho Flight Lieutenant Matiur Rahman Cricket Stadium, Chittagong
Umpires: Morshed Ali Khan (Ban) and Gazi Sohel (Ban)
Player of the match: Rovman Powell (WI)

- West Indies won the toss and elected to bat.
- Rovman Powell (WI) played in his 100th T20I match.

=== 2nd T20I ===
29 October 2025
18:00 (N)
Scorecard

West Indies; 149/9 (20 overs)	v	Bangladesh; 135/8 (20 overs)
Shai Hope 55 (36); Mustafizur Rahman 3/21 (4 overs)		Tanzid Hasan 61 (48); Akeal Hosein 3/22 (4 overs)

West Indies won by 14 runs
Bir Shrestho Flight Lieutenant Matiur Rahman Cricket Stadium, Chittagong
Umpires: Morshed Ali Khan (Ban) and Sharfuddoula (Ban)
Player of the match: Romario Shepherd (WI)

- West Indies won the toss and elected to bat.

=== 3rd T20I ===
31 October 2025
18:00 (N)
Scorecard

Bangladesh; 151 (20 overs)	v	West Indies; 152/5 (16.5 overs)
Tanzid Hasan 89 (62); Romario Shepherd 3/36 (4 overs)		Ackeem Auguste 50 (25); Rishad Hossain 3/43 (4 overs)

West Indies won by 5 wickets
Bir Shrestho Flight Lieutenant Matiur Rahman Cricket Stadium, Chittagong
Umpires: Masudur Rahman (Ban) and Sharfuddoula (Ban)
Player of the match: Roston Chase (WI)

- Bangladesh won the toss and elected to bat.
- Romario Shepherd (WI) took his first hat-trick in T20Is.
