= West Indian cricket team in Bangladesh in 2026–27 =

International cricket tour

	Bangladesh	West Indies
- Dates: 22 October – 9 November 2026
Captains	Najmul Hossain Shanto	Roston Chase

Test series
- Result: West Indies won the 2-match series 1–0
Most runs	Tawhid Hridoy (366)	Kavem Hodge (181)
Most wickets	Hasan Mahmud (8)	Jomel Warrican (16)
- Player of the series: Jomel Warrican (WI)

The West Indies cricket team toured Bangladesh in October and November 2026 to play two Test matches against the Bangladesh cricket team. The series formed part of the 2025–2027 World Test Championship cycle. In August 2026, the Bangladesh Cricket Board (BCB) announced the fixtures for the tour.

== Squads ==
Bangladesh	West Indies
Najmul Hossain Shanto (c); Taskin Ahmed; Jaker Ali (wk); Litton Das (wk); Mominul Haque; Amite Hasan (wk); Nayeem Hasan; Tanzid Hasan; Ebadot Hossain; Tawhid Hridoy; Shadman Islam; Shoriful Islam; Taijul Islam; Hasan Mahmud; Mehidy Hasan Miraz; Mushfiqur Rahim	Roston Chase (c); Jomel Warrican (vc); Joshua Bishop; John Campbell; Tagenarine Chanderpaul; Joshua Da Silva (wk); Justin Greaves; Kavem Hodge; Amir Jangoo; Shamar Joseph; Brandon King; Keemo Paul; Kemar Roach; Jayden Seales; Kevin Wickham

On 31 October, Mominul Haque was ruled out of 2nd Test due to head injury and was replaced by Amite Hasan.

== Tour match ==
22–23 October 2026
Scorecard

BCB XI	v	West Indies
371/7d (90 overs); Kalam Siddiki 135 (184); Kavem Hodge 2/34 (6 overs)		336/6 (80 overs); Kevin Wickham 67* (107); Md Hossain 4/55 (12.2 overs)

Match drawn
Bashundhara Sports City Cricket Ground, Dhaka
Umpires: Sajidul Islam (Ban) and Morshed Ali Khan (Ban)

- West Indies won the toss and elected to field.

== Test series ==
=== 1st Test ===
28–31 October 2026 (Note: While five days of play were scheduled for this Test, the test reached a result in four days.)
Scorecard

Bangladesh	v	West Indies
272 (97.4 overs); Shadman Islam 105 (234); Jomel Warrican 5/53 (23.4 overs)		245 (82.5 overs); Tagenarine Chanderpaul 56 (184); Nayeem Hasan 4/33 (10.5 overs)
142 (38.4 overs); Nayeem Hasan 52 (91); Roston Chase 5/36 (15.4 overs)		170/2 (35.1 overs); Brandon King 81* (115); Hasan Mahmud 1/14 (3 overs)

West Indies won by 8 wickets
Sher-e-Bangla National Cricket Stadium, Dhaka
Umpires: Nitin Menon (Ind) and Sam Nogajski (Aus)
Player of the match: Jomel Warrican (WI)

- Bangladesh won the toss and elected to bat.
- Joshua Bishop (WI) made his Test debut.
- World Test Championship points: West Indies 12, Bangladesh 0

=== 2nd Test ===
5–9 November 2026
Scorecard

West Indies	v	Bangladesh
356 (106.4 overs); Amir Jangoo 133 (212); Hasan Mahmud 6/90 (24 overs)		386 (111.5 overs); Tawhid Hridoy 242* (359); Jomel Warrican 4/104 (41 overs)
398/6d (93 overs); Kavem Hodge 142 (194); Nayeem Hasan 2/72 (15 overs)		184/4 (59 overs); Tawhid Hridoy 82 (140); Jomel Warrican 3/44 (18 overs)

Match drawn
Sylhet International Cricket Stadium, Sylhet
Umpires: Nitin Menon (Ind) and Asif Yaqoob (Pak)
Player of the match: Tawhid Hridoy (Ban)

- West Indies won the toss and elected to bat.
- Kevin Wickham (WI) made his Test debut..
- Tawhid Hridoy (Ban) scored his maiden century and double century in Tests. He also recorded the highest individual score in Tests for Bangladesh, breaking Mushfiqur Rahim's record of 219. He has also hit 11 sixes in the innings and scored 158 runs from boundaries, the most by any Bangaladeshi batter in a test match. He also became the first Bangladeshi batter to score 300+ runs in a match.
- Kavem Hodge (WI) scored his 1,000th run in Tests.
- Mushfiqur Rahim scored his 7,000th run in Tests, thus becoming the first Bangladeshi batter to achieve this record.
- Jomel Warrican (WI) took his 100th wicket in Tests.
- World Test Championship points: Bangladesh 4, West Indies 4
