= 2022 Caribbean Premier League =

Tenth season of the Caribbean Premier League

- Dates: 31 August – 30 September 2022
- Administrator(s): CPL Limited
- Cricket format: Twenty20
- Tournament format(s): Group stage and knockout
- Host(s): Various: Guyana; Saint Kitts and Nevis; Saint Lucia; Trinidad and Tobago
- Champions: Jamaica Tallawahs (3rd title)
- Runners-up: Barbados Royals
- Participants: 6
- Matches: 34
- Player of the series: Brandon King (Jamaica Tallawahs)
- Most runs: Brandon King (Jamaica Tallawahs) (422)
- Most wickets: Alzarri Joseph (Saint Lucia Kings) (18)
- Official website: cplt20.com

The 2022 Caribbean Premier League (CPLT20) or CPL 10 or for sponsorship reasons, Hero CPL 2022 was the tenth season of the Caribbean Premier League, the domestic Twenty20 cricket league that was played in the West Indies. The tournament was held from 31 August, with the final played on 30 September 2022. A women's tournament was also held concurrent with the men's tournament. Saint Kitts and Nevis was named as one of the hosts, with Guyana hosting the playoffs. St Kitts & Nevis Patriots were the defending champions. In June 2022, A modified T10 tournament, called The 6ixty, between the six teams were announced to be scheduled to place between 24 and 28 August 2022 right before the actual tournament.

== Squads ==
The following players were retained or signed by their respective teams for the tournament.

Barbados Royals	Guyana Amazon Warriors	Jamaica Tallawahs	St Kitts & Nevis Patriots	Saint Lucia Kings	Trinbago Knight Riders
Kyle Mayers (c); Jason Holder; Obed McCoy; Hayden Walsh Jr.; Devon Thomas; Oshane Thomas; Nyeem Young; Quinton de Kock; Mujeeb Ur Rahman; Azam Khan; Corbin Bosch; Rahkeem Cornwall; Joshua Bishop; Justin Greaves; Teddy Bishop; Ramon Simmonds; Harry Tector; Najibullah Zadran; David Miller	Shimron Hetmyer (c); Odean Smith; Romario Shepherd; Chandrapaul Hemraj; Keemo Paul; Gudakesh Motie; Imran Tahir; Colin Ingram; Paul Stirling; Jermaine Blackwood; Veerasammy Permaul; Shai Hope; Ronsford Beaton; Matthew Nandu; Junior Sinclair; Shakib Al Hasan; Rahmanullah Gurbaz; Tabraiz Shamsi; Heinrich Klaasen	Rovman Powell (c); Fabian Allen; Brandon King; Kennar Lewis; Shamarh Brooks; Imad Wasim; Mohammad Amir; Migael Pretorius; Chris Green; Raymon Reifer; Jamie Merchant; Amir Jangoo; Shamar Springer; Nicholson Gordon; Kirk McKenzie; Joshua James; Mohammad Nabi; ~~Sandeep Lamichhane~~	Dwayne Bravo (c); Evin Lewis; Andre Fletcher; Darren Bravo; Sherfane Rutherford; Sheldon Cottrell; Dominic Drakes; Dwaine Pretorius; Dewald Brevis; Joshua Da Silva; Jon-Russ Jaggesar; Keacy Carty; Kelvin Pitman; Jaden Carmichael; Duan Jansen; Akila Dananjaya; Rashid Khan; Kevin Sinclair; Jeremiah Louis; ~~Wanindu Hasaranga~~; ~~Izharulhaq Naveed~~; ~~Qasim Akram~~	Faf du Plessis (c); Roston Chase; Johnson Charles; Kesrick Williams; Alzarri Joseph; Mark Deyal; Jeavor Royal; David Wiese; Scott Kuggeleijn; Matthew Forde; Leroy Lugg; Preston McSween; Larry Edwards; Ackeem Auguste; Rivaldo Clarke; Roshon Primus; Niroshan Dickwella; Adam Hose; Tim David	Kieron Pollard (c); Andre Russell; Sunil Narine; Nicholas Pooran; Akeal Hosein; Tion Webster; Colin Munro; Tim Seifert; Seekkuge Prasanna; Khary Pierre; Anderson Phillip; Terrance Hinds; Leonardo Julien; Shaaron Lewis; Daryn Dupavillon; Ravi Rampaul; Samit Patel; Jayden Seales; ~~Ali Khan~~; ~~Maheesh Theekshana~~

== Points table ==
Pos	Team	Pld	W	L	NR	Pts	NRR
1	Barbados Royals (R)	10	8	2	0	16	1.103
2	Guyana Amazon Warriors	10	5	4	1	11	0.283
3	Saint Lucia Kings	10	4	5	1	9	0.314
4	Jamaica Tallawahs (C)	10	4	5	1	9	0.279
5	St Kitts & Nevis Patriots	10	3	5	2	8	−1.184
6	Trinbago Knight Riders	10	3	6	1	7	−0.893

- Top four teams advance to the Playoffs
- advanced to the Qualifier 1
- advanced to the Eliminator

== League stage ==
31 August 2022
19:00 (N)
Scorecard

Jamaica Tallawahs; 183/2 (20 overs)	v	St Kitts & Nevis Patriots (H); 136/8 (20 overs)
Brandon King 89 (57); Jaden Carmichael 1/22 (3 overs)		Sherfane Rutherford 33 (22); Nicholson Gordon 3/32 (4 overs)

Jamaica Tallawahs won by 47 runs
Warner Park Sporting Complex, Basseterre
Umpires: Gregory Brathwaite (WI) and Patrick Gustard (WI)
Player of the match: Brandon King (Jamaica Tallawahs)

- St Kitts & Nevis Patriots won the toss and elected to field.
- Jaden Carmichael (St Kitts & Nevis Patriots) and Nicholson Gordon (Jamaica Tallawahs) both made their T20 debuts.

1 September 2022
10:00
Scorecard

Saint Lucia Kings; 143/9 (20 overs)	v	Trinbago Knight Riders; 148/7 (19.2 overs)
Roshon Primus 38 (25); Akeal Hosein 4/13 (4 overs)		Tion Webster 58 (45); Alzarri Joseph 4/17 (4 overs)

Trinbago Knight Riders won by 3 wickets
Warner Park Sporting Complex, Basseterre
Umpires: Nigel Duguid (WI) and Leslie Reifer (WI)
Player of the match: Akeal Hosein (Trinbago Knight Riders)

- Trinbago Knight Riders won the toss and elected to field.
- Ackeem Auguste, Matthew Forde, Leroy Lugg (Saint Lucia Kings) and Shaaron Lewis (Trinbago Knight Riders) all made their T20 debuts.

1 September 2022
19:00 (N)
Scorecard

(H) St Kitts & Nevis Patriots; 149/8 (17 overs)	v	Barbados Royals; 150/3 (15.1 overs)
Andre Fletcher 81 (55); Jason Holder 2/21 (3 overs)		Kyle Mayers 73 (46); Dwayne Bravo 2/33 (4 overs)

Barbados Royals won by 7 wickets
Warner Park Sporting Complex, Basseterre
Umpires: Zahid Bassarath (WI) and Jonathan Blades (WI)
Player of the match: Corbin Bosch (Barbados Royals)

- Barbados Royals won the toss and elected to field.
- The match was reduced to 17 overs per side due to rain.
- Ramon Simmonds (Barbados Royals) made his T20 debut.

3 September 2022
10:00
Scorecard

Guyana Amazon Warriors; 142/6 (20 overs)	v	Jamaica Tallawahs; 143/6 (19.2 overs)
Shimron Hetmyer 39 (45); Mohammad Amir 3/22 (4 overs)		Rovman Powell 44* (38); Gudakesh Motie 2/10 (4 overs)

Jamaica Tallawahs won by 4 wickets
Warner Park Sporting Complex, Basseterre
Umpires: Deighton Butler (WI) and Verdayne Smith (WI)
Player of the match: Mohammad Amir (Jamaica Tallawahs)

- Jamaica Tallawahs won the toss and elected to field.

3 September 2022
19:00 (N)
Scorecard

Trinbago Knight Riders	v	St Kitts & Nevis Patriots (H)

No result
Warner Park Sporting Complex, Basseterre
Umpires: Jonathan Blades (WI) and Patrick Gustard (WI)

- St Kitts & Nevis Patriots won the toss and elected to field.
- No play was possible due to rain.

4 September 2022
10:00
Scorecard

Barbados Royals; 162/7 (20 overs)	v	Saint Lucia Kings; 91/4 (9 overs)
Kyle Mayers 36 (23); Mark Deyal 2/15 (4 overs)		Faf du Plessis 47* (20); Kyle Mayers 4/4 (2 overs)

Barbados Royals won by 11 runs (DLS method)
Warner Park Sporting Complex, Basseterre
Umpires: Leslie Reifer (WI) and Verdayne Smith (WI)
Player of the match: Kyle Mayers (Barbados Royals)

- Saint Lucia Kings won the toss and elected to field.
- Saint Lucia Kings were set a revised target of 103 runs from 9 overs due to rain.

4 September 2022
19:00 (N)
Scorecard

(H) St Kitts & Nevis Patriots	v	Guyana Amazon Warriors

Match abandoned
Warner Park Sporting Complex, Basseterre
Umpires: Zahid Bassarath (WI) and Gregory Brathwaite (WI)

- No toss.
- No play was possible due to rain.

7 September 2022
10:00
Scorecard

Barbados Royals; 194/4 (20 overs)	v	Trinbago Knight Riders; 51/7 (8 overs)
David Miller 60 (36); Sunil Narine 1/23 (4 overs)		Colin Munro 12 (7); Devon Thomas 2/4 (1 over)

Barbados Royals won by 80 runs (DLS method)
Daren Sammy Cricket Ground, Gros Islet
Umpires: Deighton Butler (WI) and Nigel Duguid (WI)
Player of the match: David Miller (Barbados Royals)

- Trinbago Knight Riders won the toss and elected to field.
- No further play was possible due to rain.

7 September 2022
19:00 (N)
Scorecard

Jamaica Tallawahs; 163/8 (20 overs)	v	Saint Lucia Kings (H); 164/8 (19.5 overs)
Raymon Reifer 62 (41); Scott Kuggeleijn 3/44 (4 overs)		Johnson Charles 62 (39); Mohammad Amir 3/25 (4 overs)

Saint Lucia Kings won by 2 wickets
Daren Sammy Cricket Ground, Gros Islet
Umpires: Gregory Brathwaite (WI) and Patrick Gustard (WI)
Player of the match: Johnson Charles (Saint Lucia Kings)

- Saint Lucia Kings won the toss and elected to field.

8 September 2022
10:00
Scorecard

Guyana Amazon Warriors; 162/6 (20 overs)	v	St Kitts & Nevis Patriots; 163/6 (19.4 overs)
Shimron Hetmyer 46 (21); Akila Dananjaya 2/28 (4 overs)		Andre Fletcher 41 (38); Odean Smith 2/10 (2 overs)

St Kitts & Nevis Patriots won by 4 wickets
Daren Sammy Cricket Ground, Gros Islet
Umpires: Nigel Duguid (WI) and Leslie Reifer (WI)
Player of the match: Duan Jansen (St Kitts & Nevis Patriots)

- Guyana Amazon Warriors won the toss and elected to bat.

8 September 2022
19:00 (N)
Scorecard

(H) Saint Lucia Kings; 169/6 (20 overs)	v	Barbados Royals; 175/4 (18.3 overs)
Tim David 40 (23); Hayden Walsh Jr. 2/19 (4 overs)		Corbin Bosch 81 (50); Alzarri Joseph 3/32 (4 overs)

Barbados Royals won by 6 wickets
Daren Sammy Cricket Ground, Gros Islet
Umpires: Zahid Bassarath (WI) and Jonathan Blades (WI)
Player of the match: Corbin Bosch (Barbados Royals)

- Barbados Royals won the toss and elected to field.

10 September 2022
10:00
Scorecard

Jamaica Tallawahs; 153/7 (20 overs)	v	Trinbago Knight Riders; 119/8 (20 overs)
Rovman Powell 67 (49); Ravi Rampaul 3/40 (4 overs)		Colin Munro 29 (30); Mohammad Amir 2/15 (4 overs)

Jamaica Tallawahs won by 34 runs
Daren Sammy Cricket Ground, Gros Islet
Umpires: Deighton Butler (WI) and Verdayne Smith (WI)
Player of the match: Imad Wasim (Jamaica Tallawahs)

- Trinbago Knight Riders won the toss and elected to field.

10 September 2022
19:00 (N)
Scorecard

(H) Saint Lucia Kings; 161/7 (20 overs)	v	Guyana Amazon Warriors; 162/4 (18.2 overs)
Johnson Charles 87* (59); Tabraiz Shamsi 2/14 (4 overs)		Heinrich Klaasen 61* (46); Jeavor Royal 2/17 (3 overs)

Guyana Amazon Warriors won by 6 wickets
Daren Sammy Cricket Ground, Gros Islet
Umpires: Jonathan Blades (WI) and Patrick Gustard (WI)
Player of the match: Heinrich Klaasen (Guyana Amazon Warriors)

- Guyana Amazon Warriors won the toss and elected to field.

11 September 2022
10:00
Scorecard

Jamaica Tallawahs; 156/8 (20 overs)	v	Barbados Royals; 157/2 (19.5 overs)
Rovman Powell 52 (31); Obed McCoy 3/24 (4 overs)		Quinton de Kock 64* (53); Chris Green 1/24 (4 overs)

Barbados Royals won by 8 wickets
Daren Sammy Cricket Ground, Gros Islet
Umpires: Leslie Reifer (WI) and Verdayne Smith (WI)
Player of the match: Obed McCoy (Barbados Royals)

- Barbados Royals won the toss and elected to field.

11 September 2022
19:00 (N)
Scorecard

(H) Saint Lucia Kings; 161/9 (20 overs)	v	St Kitts & Nevis Patriots; 100 (19 overs)
Faf du Plessis 60 (35); Dwaine Pretorius 3/37 (4 overs)		Evin Lewis 24 (9); David Wiese 3/17 (4 overs)

Saint Lucia Kings won by 61 runs
Daren Sammy Cricket Ground, Gros Islet
Umpires: Zahid Bassarath (WI) and Gregory Brathwaite (WI)
Player of the match: Matthew Forde (St Kitts & Nevis Patriots)

- St Kitts & Nevis Patriots won the toss and elected to field.
- Larry Edwards (Saint Lucia Kings) made his T20 debut.

13 September 2022
19:00 (N)
Scorecard

(H) Trinbago Knight Riders; 132 (20 overs)	v	Barbados Royals; 133/2 (16 overs)
Nicholas Pooran 52 (43); Mujeeb Ur Rahman 3/17 (4 overs)		Kyle Mayers 79 (36); Daryn Dupavillon 2/30 (4 overs)

Barbados Royals won by 8 wickets
Queen's Park Oval, Port of Spain
Umpires: Deighton Butler (WI) and Nigel Duguid (WI)
Player of the match: Kyle Mayers (Barbados Royals)

- Barbados Royals won the toss and elected to field.

14 September 2022
10:00
Scorecard

Jamaica Tallawahs; 139/5 (20 overs)	v	St Kitts & Nevis Patriots; 113/2 (12.3 overs)
Raymon Reifer 40* (26); Rashid Khan 1/8 (4 overs)		Andre Fletcher 45* (38); Fabian Allen 1/19 (2 overs)

St Kitts & Nevis Patriots won by 8 wickets (DLS method)
Queen's Park Oval, Port of Spain
Umpires: Gregory Brathwaite (WI) and Patrick Gustard (WI)
Player of the match: Rashid Khan (St Kitts & Nevis Patriots)

- St Kitts & Nevis Patriots won the toss and elected to field.
- St Kitts & Nevis Patriots were set a revised target of 113 runs from 15 overs due to rain.

14 September 2022
19:00 (N)
Scorecard

(H) Trinbago Knight Riders; 150/8 (20 overs)	v	Guyana Amazon Warriors; 124 (17.5 overs)
Colin Munro 42 (37); Tabraiz Shamsi 4/36 (4 overs)		Chandrapaul Hemraj 28 (17); Andre Russell 3/16 (2.5 overs)

Trinbago Knight Riders won by 26 runs
Queen's Park Oval, Port of Spain
Umpires: Nigel Duguid (WI) and Leslie Reifer (WI)
Player of the match: Sunil Narine (Trinbago Knight Riders)

- Guyana Amazon Warriors won the toss and elected to field.
- Junior Sinclair (Guyana Amazon Warriors) made his T20 debut.

15 September 2022
10:00
Scorecard

Barbados Royals; 146/6 (20 overs)	v	Jamaica Tallawahs; 126/5 (17 overs)
Quinton de Kock 74 (43); Imad Wasim 3/14 (3 overs)		Brandon King 46 (33); Jason Holder 3/33 (4 overs)

Jamaica Tallawahs won by 6 runs (DLS method)
Queen's Park Oval, Port of Spain
Umpires: Zahid Bassarath (WI) and Jonathan Blades (WI)
Player of the match: Imad Wasim (Jamaica Tallawahs)

- Jamaica Tallawahs won the toss and elected to field.
- Jamaica Tallawahs were set a revised target of 121 runs from 17 overs due to rain.

17 September 2022
10:00
Scorecard

Saint Lucia Kings; 189/7 (20 overs)	v	St Kitts & Nevis Patriots; 140 (20 overs)
Johnson Charles 61 (41); Dwayne Bravo 2/26 (4 overs)		Dewald Brevis 32 (19); David Wiese 3/8 (4 overs)

Saint Lucia Kings won by 49 runs
Brian Lara Cricket Academy, Tarouba
Umpires: Jonathan Blades (WI) and Patrick Gustard (WI)
Player of the match: David Wiese (Saint Lucia Kings)

- St Kitts & Nevis Patriots won the toss and elected to field.

17 September 2022
19:00 (N)
Scorecard

Jamaica Tallawahs; 116/7 (20 overs)	v	Trinbago Knight Riders (H); 119/6 (19.1 overs)
Fabian Allen 50 (35); Ravi Rampaul 4/19 (4 overs)		Colin Munro 40 (28); Mohammad Amir 2/15 (4 overs)

Trinbago Knight Riders won by 4 wickets
Brian Lara Cricket Academy, Tarouba
Umpires: Deighton Butler (WI) and Verdayne Smith (WI)
Player of the match: Ravi Rampaul (Trinbago Knight Riders)

- Jamaica Tallawahs won the toss and elected to bat.

18 September 2022
10:00
Scorecard

Barbados Royals; 107/6 (16 overs)	v	Guyana Amazon Warriors; 81/9 (16 overs)
Jason Holder 40* (33); Chandrapaul Hemraj 3/15 (3 overs)		Odean Smith 15 (6); Rahkeem Cornwall 2/12 (3 overs)

Barbados Royals won by 29 runs (DLS method)
Brian Lara Cricket Academy, Tarouba
Umpires: Zahid Bassarath (WI) and Gregory Brathwaite (WI)
Player of the match: Jason Holder (Barbados Royals)

- Guyana Amazon Warriors won the toss and elected to field.
- Rain stopped play during Barbados Royals innings. Guyana Amazon Warriors were set a revised target of 111 runs from 16 overs.

18 September 2022
19:00 (N)
Scorecard

Saint Lucia Kings; 147/6 (20 overs)	v	Trinbago Knight Riders (H); 146/6 (20 overs)
Johnson Charles 54 (46); Ravi Rampaul 2/10 (2 overs)		Tim Seifert 44 (44); Roston Chase 3/17 (4 overs)

Saint Lucia Kings won by 1 run
Brian Lara Cricket Academy, Tarouba
Umpires: Leslie Reifer (WI) and Verdayne Smith (WI)
Player of the match: Roston Chase (Saint Lucia Kings)

- Trinbago Knight Riders won the toss and elected to field.

21 September 2022
10:00
Scorecard

Barbados Royals; 156/3 (20 overs)	v	St Kitts & Nevis Patriots; 120 (19.3 overs)
Azam Khan 64 (42); Akila Dananjaya 1/25 (3 overs)		Evin Lewis 41 (36); Nyeem Young 3/5 (2.3 overs)

Barbados Royals won by 36 runs
Providence Stadium, Providence
Umpires: Deighton Butler (WI) and Nigel Duguid (WI)
Player of the match: Azam Khan (Barbados Royals)

- St Kitts & Nevis Patriots won the toss and elected to field.
- Keacy Carty (St Kitts & Nevis Patriots) made his T20 debut.

21 September 2022
19:00 (N)
Scorecard

(H) Guyana Amazon Warriors; 178/8 (20 overs)	v	Jamaica Tallawahs; 166 (19.5 overs)
Shai Hope 60 (45); Mohammad Nabi 3/12 (2 overs)		Brandon King 104 (66); Imran Tahir 2/17 (4 overs)

Guyana Amazon Warriors won by 12 runs
Providence Stadium, Providence
Umpires: Gregory Brathwaite (WI) and Patrick Gustard (WI)
Player of the match: Odean Smith (Guyana Amazon Warriors)

- Jamaica Tallawahs won the toss and elected to field.

22 September 2022
10:00
Scorecard

St Kitts & Nevis Patriots; 163/6 (20 overs)	v	Trinbago Knight Riders; 156/7 (20 overs)
Sherfane Rutherford 78 (50); Daryn Dupavillon 3/38 (4 overs)		Tim Seifert 59 (47); Sheldon Cottrell 3/33 (4 overs)

St Kitts & Nevis Patriots won by 7 runs
Providence Stadium, Providence
Umpires: Nigel Duguid (WI) and Leslie Reifer (WI)
Player of the match: Sherfane Rutherford (St Kitts & Nevis Patriots)

- St Kitts & Nevis Patriots won the toss and elected to bat.

22 September 2022
19:00 (N)
Scorecard

Saint Lucia Kings; 194/5 (20 overs)	v	Guyana Amazon Warriors (H); 195/4 (19.2 overs)
Faf du Plessis 103 (59); Shakib Al Hasan 2/33 (4 overs)		Shai Hope 59* (30); Mark Deyal 2/32 (4 overs)

Guyana Amazon Warriors won by 6 wickets
Providence Stadium, Providence
Umpires: Zahid Bassarath (WI) and Jonathan Blades (WI)
Player of the match: Shai Hope (Guyana Amazon Warriors)

- Saint Lucia Kings won the toss and elected to bat.

24 September 2022
19:00 (N)
Scorecard

(H) Guyana Amazon Warriors; 173/6 (20 overs)	v	Trinbago Knight Riders; 136 (20 overs)
Rahmanullah Gurbaz 60 (42); Sunil Narine 2/23 (4 overs)		Samit Patel 34 (27); Shakib Al Hasan 3/20 (4 overs)

Guyana Amazon Warriors won by 37 runs
Providence Stadium, Providence
Umpires: Deighton Butler (WI) and Verdayne Smith (WI)
Player of the match: Shakib Al Hasan (Guyana Amazon Warriors)

- Trinbago Knight Riders won the toss and elected to field.

25 September 2022
10:00
Scorecard

Saint Lucia Kings	v	Jamaica Tallawahs

No result
Providence Stadium, Providence
Umpires: Gregory Brathwaite (WI) and Patrick Gustard (WI)

- Jamaica Tallawahs won the toss and elected to field.
- No play was possible due to rain.
- Rivaldo Clarke (Saint Lucia Kings) made his T20 debut.

25 September 2022
19:00 (N)
Scorecard

Barbados Royals; 125 (17.3 overs)	v	Guyana Amazon Warriors (H); 126/5 (14.3 overs)
Jason Holder 42 (39); Romario Shepherd 3/14 (3 overs)		Shakib Al Hasan 53 (30); Obed McCoy 2/22 (3.3 overs)

Guyana Amazon Warriors won by 5 wickets
Providence Stadium, Providence
Umpires: Nigel Duguid (WI) and Leslie Reifer (WI)
Player of the match: Shakib Al Hasan (Guyana Amazon Warriors)

- Guyana Amazon Warriors won the toss and elected to field.

== Playoffs ==
Qualifier 1/Eliminator
1	Barbados Royals	195/5 (20 overs)
2	Guyana Amazon Warriors	108 (17.4 overs)
3	Saint Lucia Kings	115 (18 overs)
4	Jamaica Tallawahs	148/8 (20 overs)

Qualifier 2
2	Guyana Amazon Warriors	189/8 (20 overs)
4	Jamaica Tallawahs	226/4 (20 overs)

Final
1	Barbados Royals	161/7 (20 overs)
4	Jamaica Tallawahs	162/2 (16.1 overs)

=== Qualifier 1 ===
27 September 2022
10:00
Scorecard

Barbados Royals; 195/5 (20 overs)	v	Guyana Amazon Warriors; 108 (17.4 overs)
Rahkeem Cornwall 91 (54); Romario Shepherd 2/29 (4 overs)		Shimron Hetmyer 37 (29); Ramon Simmonds 3/17 (3 overs)

Barbados Royals won by 87 runs
Providence Stadium, Providence
Umpires: Zahid Bassarath (WI) and Nigel Duguid (WI)
Player of the match: Rahkeem Cornwall (Barbados Royals)

- Guyana Amazon Warriors won the toss and elected to field.

=== Eliminator ===
27 September 2022
19:00 (N)
Scorecard

Jamaica Tallawahs; 148/8 (20 overs)	v	Saint Lucia Kings; 115 (18 overs)
Shamarh Brooks 47 (31); David Wiese 3/19 (3 overs)		Faf du Plessis 41 (26); Mohammad Nabi 3/10 (4 overs)

Jamaica Tallawahs won by 33 runs
Providence Stadium, Providence
Umpires: Jonathan Blades (WI) and Verdayne Smith (WI)
Player of the match: Mohammad Nabi (Jamaica Tallawahs)

- Saint Lucia Kings won the toss and elected to field.

=== Qualifier 2 ===
28 September 2022
19:00 (N)
Scorecard

Jamaica Tallawahs; 226/4 (20 overs)	v	Guyana Amazon Warriors; 189/8 (20 overs)
Shamarh Brooks 109* (52); Romario Shepherd 2/43 (4 overs)		Keemo Paul 56 (37); Imad Wasim 2/25 (4 overs)

Jamaica Tallawahs won by 37 runs
Providence Stadium, Providence
Umpires: Deighton Butler (WI) and Patrick Gustard (WI)
Player of the match: Shamarh Brooks (Jamaica Tallawahs)

- Guyana Amazon Warriors won the toss and elected to field.

=== Final ===
30 September 2022
19:00 (N)
Scorecard

Barbados Royals; 161/7 (20 overs)	v	Jamaica Tallawahs; 162/2 (16.1 overs)
Azam Khan 51 (40); Fabian Allen 3/24 (4 overs)		Brandon King 83* (50); Kyle Mayers 1/14 (2 overs)

Jamaica Tallawahs won by 8 wickets
Providence Stadium, Providence
Umpires: Zahid Bassarath (WI) and Deighton Butler (WI)
Player of the match: Fabian Allen (Jamaica Tallawahs)

- Barbados Royals won the toss and elected to bat.

== Statistics ==
=== Most runs ===
Player	Team	Matches	Runs	High score
Brandon King	Jamaica Tallawahs	13	422	104
Kyle Mayers	Barbados Royals	12	366	79
Johnson Charles	Saint Lucia Kings	9	345	87 not out
Faf du Plessis	Saint Lucia Kings	10	332	103
Shimron Hetmyer	Guyana Amazon Warriors	11	281	46

- Source: ESPN Cricinfo

=== Most wickets ===
Player	Team	Matches	Wickets	Best bowling
Alzarri Joseph	Saint Lucia Kings	11	18	4/17
Jason Holder	Barbados Royals	12	17	3/33
Imad Wasim	Jamaica Tallawahs	13	17	3/14
Mohammad Amir	Jamaica Tallawahs	12	16	3/22
Obed McCoy	Barbados Royals	11	15	3/24

- Source: ESPN Cricinfo
