= Mikyle Louis =

Kittitian cricketer (born 2000)

Personal information
- Born: 19 August 2000 (age 26); St. Kitts and Nevis
- Batting: Right-handed
- Bowling: Right-arm leg break
- Role: Opening batter
- Relatives: Jeremiah Louis (brother)

International information
- National side: West Indies (2024-present)
- Test debut (cap 339): 10 July 2024 v England
- Last Test: 12 July 2025 v Australia

Domestic team information
- Years: Team
- 2024–present: Leeward Islands
- 2024–present: St Kitts and Nevis Patriots

Career statistics
Competition	Test	FC	LA	T20
Matches	10	24	9	9
Runs scored	369	1,571	153	201
Batting average	18.45	33.42	21.85	28.71
100s/50s	0/2	4/10	0/2	0/2
Top score	97	130	57	63
Balls bowled	–	6	104	–
Wickets	–	0	3	–
Bowling average	–	–	24.33	–
5 wickets in innings	–	0	0	–
10 wickets in match	–	0	0	–
Best bowling	–	–	2/45	–
Catches/stumpings	3/–	17/–	3/–	2/–
- Source: ESPNcricinfo, 15 July 2025

Mikyle Louis (born 19 August 2000) is a Kittitian cricketer who currently plays for the West Indies as an opening batsman.

He made his List A debut for the West Indies Under-19s in the 2016–17 Regional Super50 on 31 January 2017. In February 2024, he made his first class debut in for the Leeward Islands.

In June 2024, Louis was named in the West Indian test squad for their tour of England in 2024. In the first Test, he became the first Kittian to play for the West Indies.
