= Kavem Hodge =

West Indian cricketer

Personal information
- Full name: Kavem Ajoel Rakem Hodge
- Born: 21 February 1993 (age 33); Roseau, Dominica
- Batting: Right-handed
- Bowling: Slow left-arm orthodox
- Role: All-rounder

International information
- National side: West Indies (2023–present)
- Test debut (cap 336): 17 January 2024 v Australia
- Last Test: 5 November 2026 v Bangladesh
- ODI debut (cap 217): 4 June 2023 v United Arab Emirates
- Last ODI: 2 February 2024 v Australia

Domestic team information
- Years: Team
- 2012–present: Windward Islands
- 2014–2015: Combined Campuses
- 2018–2020: St Lucia Zouks

Career statistics
Competition	Test	ODI	FC	LA
Matches	19	4	90	63
Runs scored	1,070	37	4,672	1,551
Batting average	31.47	12.33	29.94	28.20
100s/50s	3/4	0/0	9/23	2/6
Top score	142	26	158*	123
Balls bowled	420	108	5,862	2,593
Wickets	6	2	74	63
Bowling average	54.66	56.50	39.16	28.90
5 wickets in innings	0	0	1	0
10 wickets in match	0	0	0	0
Best bowling	2/44	2/44	6/68	4/15
Catches/stumpings	17/–	0/–	92/–	18/–
- Source: Cricinfo, 12 November 2026

Kavem Ajoel Rakem Hodge (born 21 February 1993) is a Dominican cricketer who has played for both the Windward Islands and the Combined Campuses and Colleges in West Indian domestic cricket.

== Career ==
Hodge was born in Dominica's capital, Roseau, but was raised in Antrizle, a small village on the island's east coast. After captaining the Windward Islands under-19s at regional tournaments, he played for the West Indies under-19s at the 2012 Under-19 World Cup in Australia. Hodge had made his first-class debut for the Windwards earlier in the year, when he played against the Leeward Islands in the 2011–12 Regional Four Day Competition. For the 2013–14 season, he switched to the Combined Campuses, qualifying by virtue of being a student at the University of the West Indies. He also signed with the St Lucia Zouks for the inaugural Caribbean Premier League (CPL) season, but did not play a game.

In June 2018, he was named in the Cricket West Indies B Team squad for the inaugural edition of the Global T20 Canada tournament. He made his Twenty20 debut for St Lucia Stars in the 2018 Caribbean Premier League on 11 August 2018. He was the leading run-scorer for the Windward Islands in the 2018–19 Regional Super50 tournament, with 179 runs in eight matches.

In October 2019, he was named in the Windward Islands' squad for the 2019–20 Regional Super50 tournament. He was the leading run-scorer for the Windward Islands in the tournament, with 341 runs in seven matches. In July 2020, he was named in the St Lucia Zouks squad for the 2020 Caribbean Premier League.

In December 2020, Hodge was named in the West Indies' Test squad for their series against Bangladesh.

In May 2023, he was named in West Indies One Day International (ODI) squad for the series against United Arab Emirates. He made his ODI debut in the first ODI of the series, on 4 June 2023, becoming the second Dominican cricketer to make their One Day International debut for the West Indies after Alick Athanaze.

In December 2023, he was selected in West Indies squad for the Test series against Australia. He made his Test match debut on 17 January at the Adelaide Oval.

Hodge scored his maiden Test century against England at Trent Bridge in July 2024, making 120 off 171 balls.

Hodge hit his highest Test score, scoring 142 runs off 194 balls, during the 2nd Test against Bangladesh in November 2026.

== List of Test centuries ==
List of Test centuries scored by Kavem Hodge
No.	Score	Opponent	Venue	Date	Result	Refs
1	120	England	Trent Bridge, West Bridgford	18–21 July 2024	Lost	
2	123*	New Zealand	Bay Oval, Mount Maunganui	18–22 December 2025	Lost	
3	142	Bangladesh	Sylhet International Cricket Stadium, Sylhet	5–9 November 2026	Drawn	
