= St Kitts & Nevis Patriots =

Cricket franchise

- Official logo of the St Kitts & Nevis Patriots

Personnel
- Captain: Jason Holder
- Coach: Simon Helmot
- Overseas players: Dasun Shanaka; Nikhil Chaudhary; Wanindu Hasaranga; Naseem Shah; Waqar Salamkheil
- Owner: Mahesh Ramani

Team information
- Founded: 2015; 11 years ago
- Home ground: Warner Park Sporting Complex, Basseterre
- Capacity: 10,000

History
- CPL wins: 1 (2021)
- 6ixty wins: 1 (2022)
- Official website: sknpatriots.com
T20I kit

The St Kitts & Nevis Patriots are a Caribbean Premier League (CPL) cricket franchise based in Saint Kitts and Nevis that participated in the competition for the first time in 2015. The team plays its home games at Warner Park, Basseterre, located on Saint Kitts, and, like the league's other franchises, draws the majority of its players from West Indian domestic teams.

== History ==
The league's first expansion team, the new franchise was announced on 27th January 2015, supported by the Saint Kitts & Nevis government as well as the local business community. During the 2014 CPL tournament, Warner Park hosted nine matches, played over 10 days in August and accompanied by several carnivals and other entertainments. The venue hosted the final six group-stage matches, and then the finals series, comprising two semi-finals and the final between Barbados Tridents and the Guyana Amazon Warriors.

The Saint Kitts and Nevis franchise effectively replaced the Antigua Hawksbills franchise (based in Antigua and Barbuda), although it was intended that the Hawksbills franchise would be revived at a later date, with the CPL consequently featuring seven teams rather than six. The Hawksbills were primarily removed from the competition in order to make scheduling easier, though their poor results and lack of a private owner also contributed to their removal. Saint Kitts and Nevis nominated four previous Hawksbills players – Justin Athanaze, Carlos Brathwaite, Orlando Peters, and Devon Thomas – as their "retained players" prior to the 2015 CPL Draft. South African Eric Simons, formerly senior coach of the Delhi Daredevils in the Indian Premier League (IPL), was confirmed as the franchise's inaugural coach in early February 2015. Simons was tasked with building the team's coaching structure ahead of its inaugural 2015 CPL season.

== Current squad ==
- Players with international caps are listed in **bold**.

As of 28 July 2026

No.	Name	Nationality	Birth date	Batting style	Bowling style	Year signed	Notes
Batsmen
—N/a	**Alick Athanaze**	Dominica	7 December 1998 (age 27)	Left-handed	Right-arm off break	2025	
—N/a	**Navin Bidaisee**	Trinidad and Tobago	24 March 2000 (age 26)	Left-handed	Right-arm off break	2025	
	Kevin Wickham	Barbados	19 March 2003 (age 23)	Right-handed	Right-arm Off Spin	2026	
—N/a	**Mikyle Louis**	Saint Kitts and Nevis	19 August 2000 (age 26)	Right-handed	Right-arm leg break	2024	
All-rounders
7	**Dasun Shanaka**	Sri Lanka	9 September 1991 (age 34)	Right-handed	Right-arm medium	2026	Overseas
98	**Jason Holder**	Barbados	5 November 1991 (age 34)	Right-handed	Right arm medium fast	2025	**Captain**
71	**Kyle Mayers**	Barbados	8 September 1992 (age 33)	Left-handed	Right-arm medium	2024	
4	**Nikhil Chaudhary**	Australia	4 May 1996 (age 30)	Right-handed	Right-arm off spin	2026	Overseas
49	**Wanindu Hasaranga**	Sri Lanka	29 July 1997 (age 29)	Right-handed	Right-arm leg-break	2026	Overseas
Wicket-keepers
72	**Andre Fletcher**	Grenada	28 November 1987 (age 38)	Right-handed		2022	
25	**Johnson Charles**	Saint Lucia	14 January 1989 (age 37)	Right-handed		2026	
Bowlers
—N/a	**Obed McCoy**	Saint Vincent and the Grenadines	4 January 1997 (age 29)	Left-handed	Left-arm fast-medium	2026	
—N/a	Jeremiah Louis	Saint Kitts and Nevis	12 March 1996 (age 30)	Right-handed	Right-arm medium-fast	2024	
—N/a	Micah McKenzie	Antigua and Barbuda	18 January 2007 (age 19)	Right-handed	Right-arm leg spin	2026	
—N/a	Ashmead Nedd	Guyana	10 January 2001 (age 25)	Right-handed	Left-arm orthodox	2025	
6	**Waqar Salamkheil**	Afghanistan	2 October 2001 (age 24)	Right-handed	Left-arm unorthodox spin	2025	Overseas
77	**Naseem Shah**	Pakistan	15 February 2003 (age 23)	Right-handed	Right-arm fast	2025	Overseas

- Source:St Kitts & Nevis Patriots Players

== Statistical summary ==
As of 30 August 2023

Year	Played	Wins	Losses	Tied	NR	Win %	Position
2015	10	4	6	0	0	40%	6/6
2016	10	2	8	0	0	20%	6/6
2017	12	7	4	0	1	58.33%	2/6
2018	12	6	5	0	1	50%	3/6
2019	11	5	6	0	0	45.45%	4/6
2020	10	1	8	0	1	10%	6/6
2021	12	8	4	0	0	66.67%	1/6
2022	10	3	5	0	2	30%	5/6
2023	10	1	7	0	2	10%	6/6
Total	97	37	53	0	7	38.14%	

- Source: ESPNcricinfo
- Abandoned matches are counted as NR (no result)
- Win or loss by super over or boundary count are counted as tied.
- Tied+Win - Counted as a win and Tied+Loss - Counted as a loss.
- NR indicates no result.

== Administration and support staff ==
Position	Name
Head coach	Malolan Rangarajan

== Statistics ==
As of 18 April 2024

=== Most runs ===
Player	Seasons	Runs
Evin Lewis	2015–present	1,702
Devon Thomas	2015–2019, 2021	924
Chris Gayle	2017–2018, 2021	730
Carlos Brathwaite	2015–2019	502
Fabian Allen	2017–2019, 2021	436
Source: ESPNcricinfo

=== Most wickets ===
Player	Seasons	Wickets
Sheldon Cottrell	2015–present	61
Carlos Brathwaite	2015–2019	36
Tabraiz Shamsi	2015–2018	33
Rayad Emrit	2019–2020	23
Alzarri Joseph	2016–2020	21
Source: ESPNcricinfo

== Seasons ==
=== Caribbean Premier League ===
Year	League standing	Season standing
2015	6th out of 6	League stage
2016	6th out of 6	League stage
2017	2nd out of 6	Runners-up
2018	4th out of 6	Qualifier
2019	3rd out of 6	Eliminator
2020	6th out of 6	League stage
2021	3rd out of 6	Champion
2022	5th out of 6	League stage
2023	6th out of 6	League stage
2024	6th out of 6	League stage

=== The 6ixty ===
Season	League standing	Final position
2022	4th out of 6	Champions

== See also ==
- Leeward Islands cricket team
