= Super Over =

Tie-breaking method used in cricket

Super Over, also known as a one-over eliminator or a one over per side eliminator, is a tie-breaking method used in limited-overs cricket matches similar to overtime in most other sports and extra innings in baseball. If a match ends in a "tie", it proceeds to a Super Over, in which each team plays a single additional over of six balls to determine the winner. The team scoring the most runs in that over is declared the winner.

Following a rule change in October 2019 for knockout and bilateral series matches, if a Super Over ends in a tie, another Super Over is played similar to baseball and overtime in some sports.

== History ==
A Super Over was first used in 2008 in Twenty20 cricket, replacing the bowl-out method previously used to break a tie. The Super Over was introduced into One Day International (ODI) cricket at the 2011 Cricket World Cup, but it was not required.

For the following World Cup, a Super Over would be used only to decide the final in the event of a tie. Ties in other knockout-stage matches reverted to the previous rule, where the team with the better group-stage performance would advance. In 2017, the ICC introduced the Super Over for the knockout stages of that year's Women's Cricket World Cup and Champions Trophy.

The 2019 Cricket World Cup Final marked the first-ever ODI to be decided by a Super Over. After the two teams tied on runs in their Super Over, England was declared the winner over New Zealand through the controversial boundary count-back rule, which has since been replaced with the current rules.

The first "double" Super Over was played in the 2020 Indian Premier League T20 Match between Mumbai Indians and Punjab Kings. The first "double" Super Over in an international match was between Afghanistan and India in 2024.

The first "triple" Super Over was played during the 2025 Scotland T20I Tri-Nation Series in a match between Nepal and the Netherlands on 16 June 2025.

=== Previous iterations and changes ===
If the teams have played a Super Over and it also ends in a tie, the original rules stated that the winner would be determined by one of the following methods:

- The total number of boundaries scored throughout the match and Super Over.
- The total number of boundaries scored throughout the match, excluding the Super Over.
- A boundary count-back conducted from the last ball of the Super Over.

In the boundary count-back method, if both teams had scored the same number of boundaries, the final ball of the Super Over would be ignored, and the boundary count would be reassessed. If the teams remained tied, the second-to-last ball would also be excluded, and the process would continue until one team was ahead.

If the Duckworth–Lewis method had been used during the match, the Super Over would immediately be decided by the count-back criterion.

Previously, if a Super Over ended in a tie, the winner was first determined by the number of boundary sixes hit by each team across both innings. If still tied, the number of sixes hit in the main match was used as the deciding factor.

After the tied Super Over in the 2019 Cricket World Cup Final, which England won on boundary count, the ICC was criticised by many former cricketers and numerous fans for the use of such a controversial tie-breaker.

In October 2019, the ICC amended the rule:

- If a Super Over is tied in the group stage of a tournament, the match will be declared a tie.
- In knockout matches, the Super Over will be repeated until a winner is determined.
- In any bilateral series match, the Super Over will also be repeated until one team wins.

Each consecutive Super Over must take place five minutes after the previous one. The team that batted second in the previous Super Over will bat first in the next. Any batter dismissed in a previous Super Over is ineligible to bat again.

== Rules ==
The International Cricket Council (ICC) states the official rules for Super Overs in the Standard Twenty20 International Match Playing Conditions, which have been in effect since 1 October 2012.

Each team selects three batters, and the team's Super Over innings ends if two of their batters are out. The team that batted second in the main match bats first in the Super Over, while the bowling team chooses the end to bowl from. If the Super Over is tied, it is repeated until a winner is determined, although some tournaments may instead conclude the match as a tie. Each consecutive Super Over must take place five minutes after the previous one. The team that batted last in the previous Super Over will bat first in the next, and any batter dismissed in a previous Super Over is ineligible to bat again.

=== Variations ===
In the 2014–15 season, the Big Bash League introduced a variation of the rules, allowing each team to use all ten wickets in their Super Over innings.

=== Scoring ===
A Super Over is not considered part of the main match; therefore, the runs scored and wickets taken during it are not added to a player's career statistics.

=== Example ===
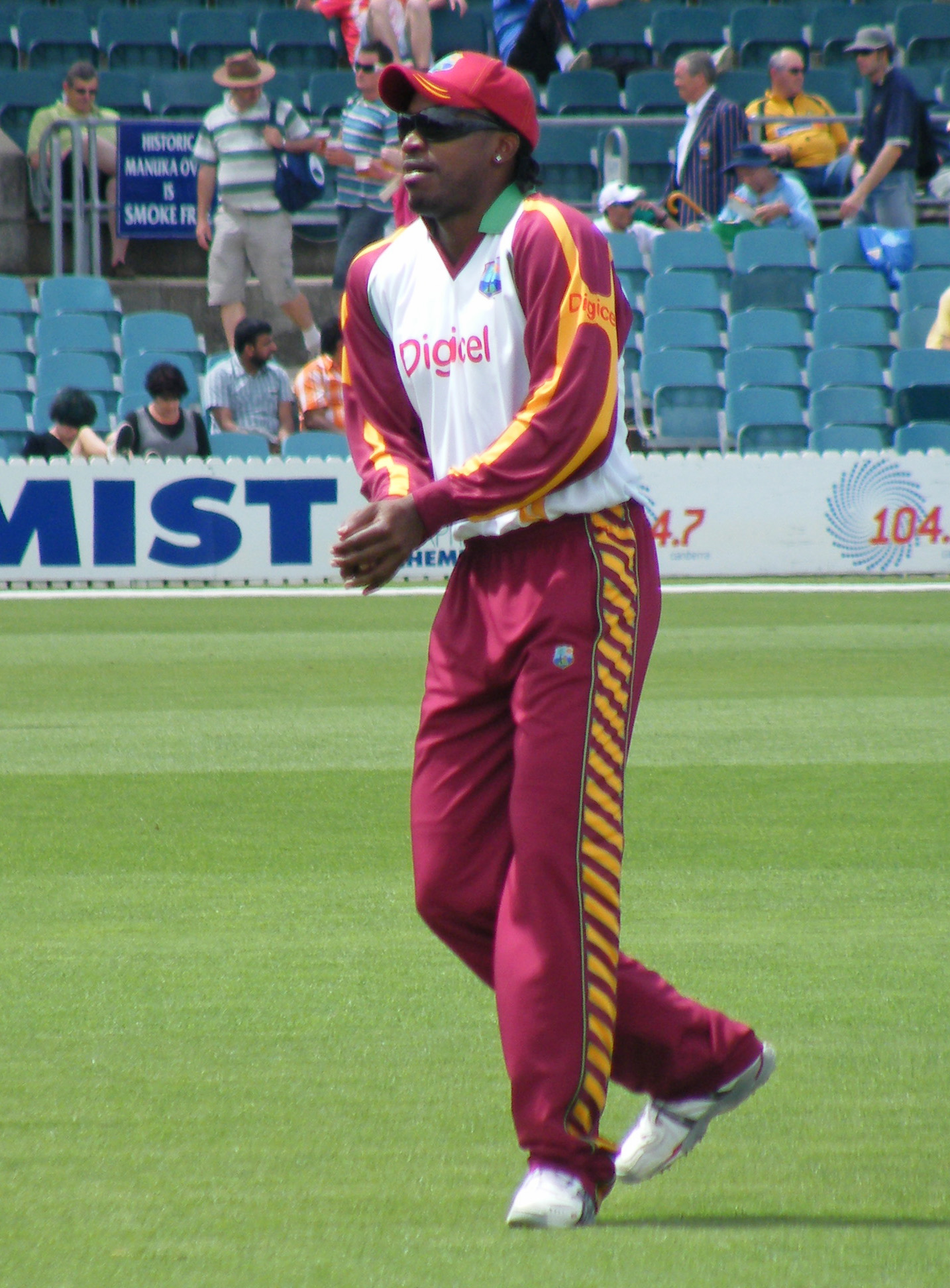
Chris Gayle scored 25 runs in the first Super Over

The first-ever Super Over was used in a tied Twenty20 match between the West Indies and New Zealand on 26 December 2008. The West Indies scored 25/1 in their Super Over, while New Zealand replied with 15/2.

The Twenty20 match between New Zealand and the West Indies on 26 December 2008 ended in a tie after both teams completed their 20 overs.

- Daniel Vettori was the "nominated bowler" for New Zealand.
- Chris Gayle and Xavier Marshall opened the "mini-innings".
- Marshall was run out without facing a ball, and Shivnarine Chanderpaul similarly remained at the non-striker's end.
- Gayle hit 25 runs off the 6 balls he faced.

The West Indies scored 25/1 from six balls in their Super Over.

- Sulieman Benn was the nominated bowler for the West Indies.
- New Zealand opener Jacob Oram was caught on Benn's third "Super Over" delivery.
- The third man in Ross Taylor hit a six but was then clean-bowled on the next ball. Oram's "Super Over" opening partner Brendon McCullum did not face a delivery.

New Zealand scored 15/2 (all out) from five balls in their Super Over.

The West Indies thus won the Super Over.

== Views on use ==
The Super Over is often used in the group stage of Twenty20 tournaments. Journalist Sambit Bal described this use as unnecessary outside of knockout stages, arguing that a tie is a satisfactory result for both teams and in terms of entertainment value. Former New Zealand coach Mike Hesson also criticised the practice after his team lost two matches by Super Overs in the Super Eight group stage of the 2012 ICC World Twenty20. After New Zealand's loss to England in the 2019 Cricket World Cup Final via a Super Over, New Zealand coach Gary Stead suggested that the ICC should have considered awarding the championship jointly to both teams rather than using a tiebreaker.

== International matches decided by a Super Over ==
=== Men's One Day International ===
Date	Venue	Winner	Score	Loser	Score	ODI	Ref
14 July 2019	Lord's, London, England	England	15/0^{†}	New Zealand	15/1	World Cup Final	
3 November 2020	Rawalpindi Cricket Stadium, Rawalpindi, Pakistan	Zimbabwe	3/0	Pakistan	2/2	3rd	
26 June 2023	Takashinga Cricket Club, Harare, Zimbabwe	Netherlands	30/0	West Indies	8/2	CWC Qualifier	
9 March 2025	Wanderers Cricket Ground, Windhoek, Namibia	Canada	7/0	Namibia	3/2	CWC League 2	
21 May 2025	Broward County Stadium, Lauderhill, United States	Oman	14/0	United States	13/0	CWC League 2	
21 October 2025	Sher-e-Bangla National Cricket Stadium, Dhaka, Bangladesh	West Indies	10/1	Bangladesh	9/1	2nd	

^{†} England won due to having more boundaries in the match (26–17).

=== Men's Twenty20 International ===
Date	Venue	Winner	Score	Loser	Score	T20I	Ref
26 December 2008	Eden Park, Auckland, New Zealand	West Indies	25/1	New Zealand	15/2	1st	
28 February 2010	Lancaster Park, Christchurch, New Zealand	New Zealand	9/0	Australia	6/1	2nd	
7 September 2012	Dubai International Cricket Stadium, Dubai, United Arab Emirates	Pakistan	12/0	Australia	11/1	2nd	
27 September 2012	Pallekele International Cricket Stadium, Kandy, Sri Lanka	Sri Lanka	13/1	New Zealand	7/1	World T20	
1 October 2012	Pallekele International Cricket Stadium, Kandy, Sri Lanka	West Indies	18/0	New Zealand	17/0	World T20	
30 November 2015	Sharjah Cricket Stadium, Sharjah, United Arab Emirates	England	4/0	Pakistan	3/1	3rd	
22 January 2019	Oman Cricket Academy Ground, Muscat, Oman	Qatar	6/0	Kuwait	5/1	Western Region T20	
19 March 2019	Newlands Cricket Ground, Cape Town, South Africa	South Africa	14/0	Sri Lanka	5/0	1st	
31 May 2019	College Field, Saint Peter Port, Guernsey	Jersey	15/0	Guernsey	14/1	1st	
25 June 2019	Hazelaarweg Stadion, Rotterdam, Netherlands	Zimbabwe	18/0	Netherlands	9/1	2nd	
5 July 2019	West End Park International Cricket Stadium, Doha, Qatar	Qatar	14 runs	Kuwait	12 runs	2nd	
10 November 2019	Eden Park, Auckland, New Zealand	England	17/0	New Zealand	8/1	5th	
29 January 2020	Seddon Park, Hamilton, New Zealand	India	20/0	New Zealand	17/0	3rd	
31 January 2020	Wellington Regional Stadium, Wellington, New Zealand	India	16/1	New Zealand	13/1	4th	
10 March 2020	Shaheed Vijay Singh Pathik Sports Complex, Greater Noida, India	Ireland	12/1	Afghanistan	8/1	3rd	
10 November 2021	Coolidge Cricket Ground, Osbourn, Antigua and Barbuda	United States	22/1	Canada	14/0	T20 World Cup Qualifier	
13 February 2022	Sydney Cricket Ground, Sydney, Australia	Australia	9/0	Sri Lanka	5/1	2nd	
2 April 2023	Eden Park, Auckland, New Zealand	Sri Lanka	12/0	New Zealand	8/2	1st	
17 January 2024	M. Chinnaswamy Stadium, Bengaluru, India	India	16/0	Afghanistan	16/1	3rd	
17 January 2024	M. Chinnaswamy Stadium, Bengaluru, India	India	11/2	Afghanistan	1/2	3rd	
2 June 2024	Kensington Oval, Bridgetown, Barbados	Namibia	21/0	Oman	10/1	T20 World Cup	
6 June 2024	Grand Prairie Stadium, Dallas, United States	United States	18/1	Pakistan	13/1	T20 World Cup	
30 July 2024	Pallekele International Cricket Stadium, Pallekele, Sri Lanka	India	4/0	Sri Lanka	2/2	3rd	
20 October 2024	Grand Prairie Stadium, Dallas, United States	Nepal	3/0	United States	2/2	2nd	
14 March 2025	Bayuemas Oval, Pandamaran, Malaysia	Hong Kong	1/0	Bahrain	0/2	Malaysia Tri-Nation Series	
16 June 2025	Titwood, Glasgow, Scotland	Netherlands	19/0	Nepal	19/1	Scotland Tri-Nation Series	
16 June 2025	Titwood, Glasgow, Scotland	Netherlands	17/1	Nepal	17/0	Scotland Tri-Nation Series	
16 June 2025	Titwood, Glasgow, Scotland	Netherlands	6/0	Nepal	0/2	Scotland Tri-Nation Series	
23 July 2025	West End Park International Cricket Stadium, Doha, Qatar	Saudi Arabia	17/0	Qatar	14/0	5th	
13 September 2025	Malkerns Country Club Oval, Malkerns, Eswatini	Eswatini	14/0	Mozambique	13/0	4th	
26 September 2025	Dubai International Cricket Stadium, Dubai, UAE	India	3/0	Sri Lanka	2/2	Asia Cup	
11 February 2026	Narendra Modi Stadium, Ahmedabad, India	South Africa	17/1	Afghanistan	17/0	T20 World Cup	
11 February 2026	Narendra Modi Stadium, Ahmedabad, India	South Africa	23/0	Afghanistan	19/2	T20 World Cup	
28 February 2026	Terdthai Cricket Ground, Bangkok, Thailand	Bahrain	15/1	Japan	10/2	2026 Thailand Open Quadrangular Series	

=== Women's One-Day International ===
Date	Venue	Winner	Score	Loser	Score	ODI	Ref
19 September 2021	Sir Vivian Richards Stadium, Antigua, Antigua and Barbuda	West Indies	10/1	South Africa	6/0	5th	
31 January 2022	Wanderers Stadium, Johannesburg, South Africa	West Indies	25/0	South Africa	17/1	2nd	
7 November 2023	Sher-e-Bangla National Cricket Stadium, Dhaka, Bangladesh	Bangladesh	10/1	Pakistan	7/2	2nd	
18 December 2023	Hagley Oval, Christchurch, New Zealand	Pakistan	11/0	New Zealand	8/2	3rd	

=== Women's Twenty20 International ===
Date	Venue	Winner	Score	Loser	Score	T20I	Ref
1 February 2020	Manuka Oval, Canberra, Australia	England	12/0	Australia	9/0	2nd	
11 December 2022	DY Patil Sports Academy, Mumbai, India	India	20/1	Australia	16/1	2nd	
14 March 2025	N'Du Stadium, Nouméa, New Caledonia	Fiji	8/0	France	8/0	Series	
14 March 2025	N'Du Stadium, Nouméa, New Caledonia	Fiji	5/0	France	4/1	Series	

== See also ==
- Bowl-out (cricket)
- Penalty shoot-out (association football)
- Extra innings (baseball)
- Tied Test
