= West Indian cricket team in England in 2024 =

International cricket tour

	England	West Indies
- Dates: 10 July – 30 July 2024
Captains	Ben Stokes	Kraigg Brathwaite

Test series
- Result: England won the 3-match series 3–0
Most runs	Joe Root (291)	Kavem Hodge (216)
Most wickets	Gus Atkinson (22)	Jayden Seales (13)
- Player of the series: Gus Atkinson (Eng)

The West Indies cricket team toured England in July 2024 to play three Test matches against England. The teams contested the Richards-Botham Trophy and formed a part of the 2023–2025 ICC World Test Championship. In July 2023, the England and Wales Cricket Board (ECB) confirmed the fixtures, as a part of the 2024 home schedule.

England won the series 3–0.

== Squads ==
England	West Indies
Ben Stokes (c); Ollie Pope (vc); James Anderson; Gus Atkinson; Shoaib Bashir; Harry Brook; Zak Crawley; Ben Duckett; Dan Lawrence; Dillon Pennington; Matthew Potts; Joe Root; Jamie Smith (wk); Chris Woakes; Mark Wood	Kraigg Brathwaite (c); Alzarri Joseph (vc); Alick Athanaze; Joshua Da Silva (wk); Jason Holder; Kavem Hodge; Tevin Imlach; Akeem Jordan; Shamar Joseph; ~~Jeremiah Louis~~; Mikyle Louis; Zachary McCaskie; Kirk McKenzie; Gudakesh Motie; ~~Kemar Roach~~; Jayden Seales; Kevin Sinclair

On 27 June 2024, Kemar Roach was ruled out of the series with a knee injury; Jeremiah Louis was named as his replacement. On 24 July 2024, Jeremiah Louis was ruled out of the series with a hamstring injury, Akeem Jordan was named as his replacement.

England's James Anderson was named for the first Test match only, after which he retired from Test cricket. On 13 July 2024, Mark Wood was added to the England squad for the second Test.

== Tour match ==
=== 3-day warm-up match ===
3–5 July 2024
Scorecard

West Indies	v	County Select XI
339 (72.1 overs); Kavem Hodge 112 (128); Farhan Ahmed 4/48 (12 overs)		373/4d (85 overs); Will Luxton 112* (130); Kavem Hodge 1/20 (4 overs)
196/5d (44 overs); Alick Athanaze 66* (99); Sonny Baker 2/49 (8 overs)		30/2 (10.3 overs); Hamza Shaikh 17* (28); Jeremiah Louis 1/5 (3 overs)

Match drawn
County Cricket Ground, Beckenham
Umpires: Hassan Adnan (Eng) and Chris Watts (Eng)

- West Indies won the toss and elected to bat.

== Test series ==
=== 1st Test ===
10–12 July 2024
Scorecard

West Indies	v	England
121 (41.4 overs); Mikyle Louis 27 (58); Gus Atkinson 7/45 (12 overs)		371 (90 overs); Zak Crawley 76 (89); Jayden Seales 4/77 (20 overs)
136 (47 overs); Gudakesh Motie 31* (35); Gus Atkinson 5/61 (14 overs)

England won by an innings and 114 runs
Lord's, London
Umpires: Nitin Menon (Ind) and Rod Tucker (Aus)
Player of the match: Gus Atkinson (Eng)

- England won the toss and elected to field.
- Gus Atkinson, Jamie Smith (Eng) and Mikyle Louis (WI) all made their Test debuts.
- James Anderson (Eng) played in his last Test match.
- Chris Woakes (Eng) took his 150th wicket in Tests.
- Gus Atkinson (Eng) became the twelfth player to take two five-wicket hauls on his Test debut, and also registered the second-best bowling figures on Test debut by an English cricketer.
- Ben Stokes (Eng) took his 200th wicket in Tests.
- World Test Championship points: England 12, West Indies 0

=== 2nd Test ===
18–21 July 2024
Scorecard

England	v	West Indies
416 (88.3 overs); Ollie Pope 121 (167); Alzarri Joseph 3/98 (15.3 overs)		457 (111.5 overs); Kavem Hodge 120 (171); Chris Woakes 4/84 (28 overs)
425 (92.2 overs); Joe Root 122 (178); Jayden Seales 4/97 (22.2 overs)		143 (36.1 overs); Kraigg Brathwaite 47 (48); Shoaib Bashir 5/41 (11.1 overs)

England won by 241 runs
Trent Bridge, Nottingham
Umpires: Adrian Holdstock (SA) and Rod Tucker (Aus)
Player of the match: Ollie Pope (Eng)

- West Indies won the toss and elected to field.
- Kavem Hodge (WI) scored his first century in Tests.
- This was the first time England had scored 400 runs in both innings of a Test match.
- World Test Championship points: England 12, West Indies 0

=== 3rd Test ===
26–28 July 2024
Scorecard

West Indies	v	England
282 (75.1 overs); Kraigg Brathwaite 61 (86); Gus Atkinson 4/67 (20 overs)		376 (75.4 overs); Jamie Smith 95 (109); Alzarri Joseph 4/122 (17.4 overs)
175 (52 overs); Mikyle Louis 57 (95); Mark Wood 5/40 (14 overs)		87/0 (7.2 overs); Ben Stokes 57* (28)

England won by 10 wickets
Edgbaston, Birmingham
Umpires: Adrian Holdstock (SA) and Nitin Menon (Ind)
Player of the match: Mark Wood (Eng)

- West Indies won the toss and elected to bat.
- Jayden Seales (WI) took his 50th wicket in Tests.
- Joe Root (Eng) scored his 12,000th run in Tests.
- Alzarri Joseph (WI) took his 100th wicket in Tests.
- Ben Stokes scored the fastest half-century for England in Tests.
- World Test Championship points: England 12, West Indies 0
