= Ramon Simmonds =

Barbadian cricketer

Personal information
- Full name: Ramon Romario Simmonds
- Born: 16 October 2001 (age 25); Barbados
- Bowling: Left-arm fast medium
- Role: Bowler

International information
- National side: West Indies (2025–present)
- T20I debut (cap 107): 27 September 2025 v Nepal
- Last T20I: 30 September 2025 v Nepal

Domestic team information
- Years: Team
- 2022–present: Barbados
- 2022–present: Barbados Royals
- 2023: Paarl Royals
- 2023: West Indies Academy

Career statistics
Competition	T20I	FC	LA	T20
Matches	2	12	4	24
Runs scored	0	55	0	30
Batting average	–	11.00	–	–
100s/50s	0/0	0/0	0/0	0/0
Top score	–	15*	0*	13*
Balls bowled	30	1387	177	438
Wickets	4	38	7	27
Bowling average	10.00	19.89	25.85	22.55
5 wickets in innings	0	1	0	0
10 wickets in match	–	0	–	–
Best bowling	4/15	6/27	4/39	4/15
Catches/stumpings	0/–	6/–	1/–	3/-
- Source: ESPNcricinfo, 30 December 2025

Ramon Romario Simmonds (born 16 October 2001) is a Barbadian cricketer, who is a left-arm fast medium bowler. He plays for Barbados cricket team in West Indian domestic cricket, having previously represented the West Indies under-19 cricket team.

== Early career ==
Simmonds played for Barbados under-17 team in the 2018 West Indies Cricket Board Under-17 Tournament, which was held in July 2018. In November 2019, he was named in West Indies' squad for the 2020 Under-19 Cricket World Cup. He made his under-19 debut on 10 December 2019, against Sri Lanka in the 2019–20 West Indies Under-19 Tri-Nation Series.

In December 2020, he was selected to play for Everton Weekes Centre Of Excellence A Team in the 2020–21 BCA Super Cup 50 Over. In July 2022, he was named in the inaugural batch of the CWI Emerging Players Academy for high-performance training and development sessions.

== Domestic career ==
=== Local cricket ===
Simmonds was part of the Barbados' squad that won the 2021–22 West Indies Championship. He made his first-class debut for Barbados on 9 February 2022, against the Leeward Islands. He took a wicket in the first innings and a four-wicket haul in the second innings on his debut match, helping Barbados to win the match by six wickets. He impressed in his debut first-class season picking up 12 wickets from 4 matches, and finished as the second highest wicket-taker for Barbados. In October 2022, he was selected to play for Barbados in the 2022–23 Super50 Cup. He made his List A debut on 1 November 2022, against West Indies Academy, and took four wickets conceding 39 runs. In April 2023, he was named in West Indies Academy's squad for the inaugural 2023 Headley Weekes Tri-Series.

=== Franchise career ===
In July 2022, Simmonds was named in Barbados Royals' squad for the 2022 season of The 6ixty, a T10 cricket tournament. In August 2022, Simmonds was signed by the Barbados Royals to play for them in the 2022 Caribbean Premier League. He made his Twenty20 debut for Barbados Royals on 1 September 2022, against St Kitts and Nevis Patriots. On 27 September 2022, he grabbed three wickets for 17 runs leading Barbados Royals to win the Qualifier 1 by 87 runs and progress to the final. He claimed seven wickets from eight matches, and won the Emerging Player of the Tournament award. He impressed the management with his bowling variations including execution of slower balls and yorkers and courage to bowl the difficult overs. He was named in the 2022 Hero CPL Team of the Tournament, as a result of his performances throughout the tournament.

In September 2022, he was bought by Paarl Royals at a price of US$ 9,862 to play for them in the inaugural season of the SA20.
