= Nicholson Gordon =

Jamaican cricketer

Personal information
- Full name: Nicholson Anthony Gordon
- Born: 22 October 1991 (age 35); Westmoreland Parish, Jamaica
- Batting: Right-handed
- Bowling: Right-arm fast-medium

Domestic team information
- Years: Team
- 2016: Jamaica

Career statistics
Competition	FC	LA	T20
Matches	15	18	16
Runs scored	1107	569	376
Batting average	25.15	25.86	28.92
100s/50s	0/0	0/0	0/0
Top score	22*	24*	5*
Balls bowled	1997	580	246
Wickets	44	22	13
Bowling average	6.75	11.0	2.5
5 wickets in innings	3	0	0
10 wickets in match	0	0	0
Best bowling	7/70	3/21	3/32
Catches/stumpings	7/0	6/0	4/0
- Source: , 7 January 2024

Nicholson Anthony Gordon (born 22 October 1991) is a Jamaican cricketer who made his debut for the Jamaican national side in January 2016. He is a right-arm fast bowler.

Gordon was born in Westmoreland Parish. He made his List A debut in October 2009, playing a single match for the West Indies under-19s in the 2009–10 WICB President's Cup. The following year, Gordon represented the team at the 2010 Under-19 World Cup in New Zealand. He appeared in four of his team's matches, including the semi-final loss to Pakistan, but failed to take a wicket at the tournament. Gordon made his senior debut for Jamaica in the 2015–16 Regional Super50 tournament, against ICC Americas. He took 2/17 on debut, and played another two games before being dropped. Later in the season, Gordon also made his first-class debut, playing matches against Barbados and the Windward Islands in the 2015–16 Regional Four Day Competition.

In October 2019, he was named in Jamaica's squad for the 2019–20 Regional Super50 tournament. He made his Twenty20 debut on 31 August 2022, for Jamaica Tallawahs in the 2022 Caribbean Premier League.
