= Towhid Hridoy =

Bangladeshi cricketer (born 2000)

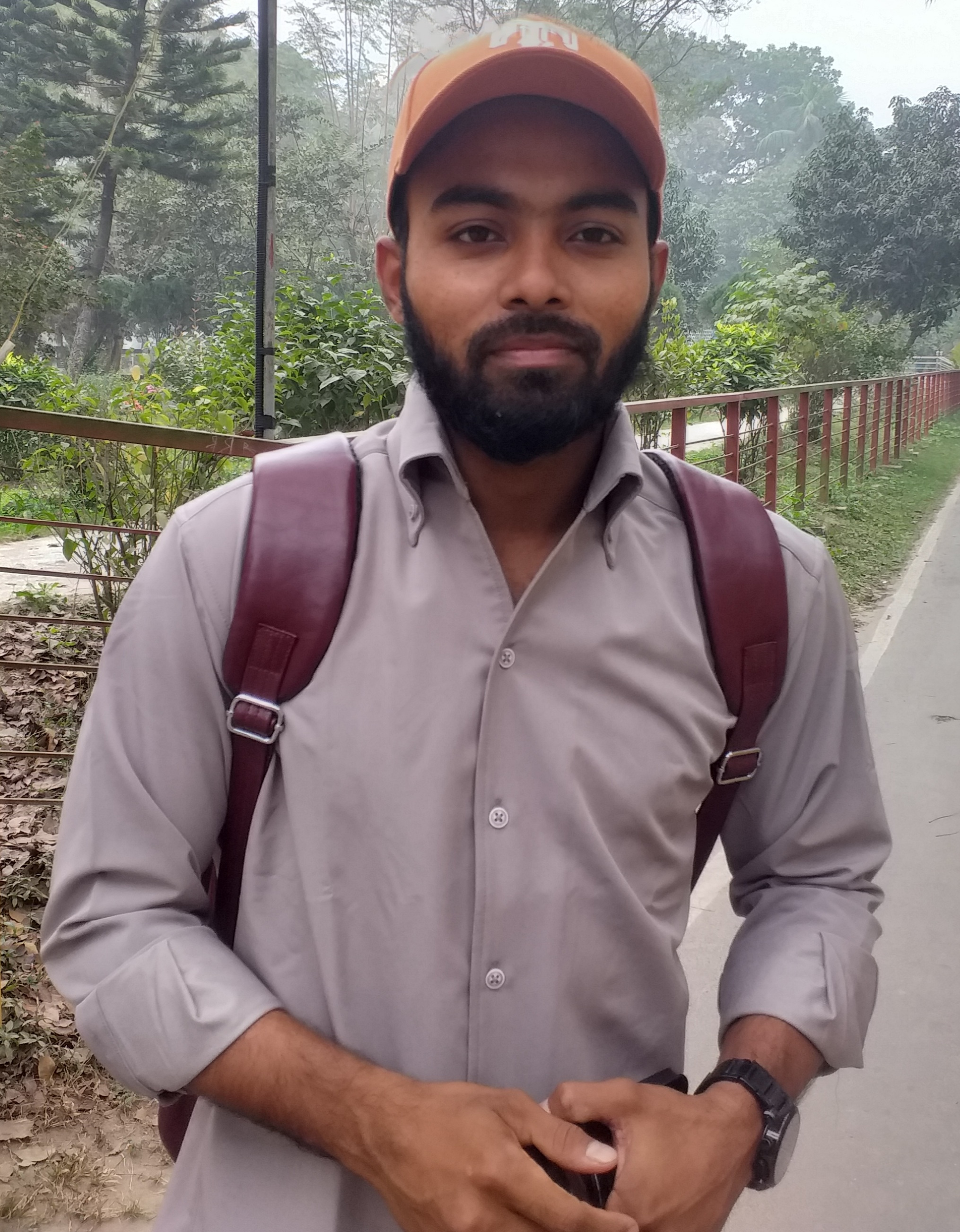
- Hridoy in 2025

Personal information
- Full name: Mohammad Towhid Hridoy
- Born: 4 December 2000 (age 25); Bogra, Rajshahi
- Height: 5 ft 9 in (175 cm)
- Batting: Right-handed
- Bowling: Right-arm offbreak
- Role: Middle-Order Batter

International information
- National side: Bangladesh (2023–present)
- Test debut (cap 110): 28 June 2026 v Zimbabwe
- Last Test: 5 November 2026 v West Indies
- ODI debut (cap 140): 18 March 2023 v Ireland
- Last ODI: 21 October 2026 v Afghanistan
- ODI shirt no.: 77
- T20I debut (cap 78): 9 March 2023 v England
- Last T20I: 3 October 2026 v Sri Lanka
- T20I shirt no.: 77

Domestic team information
- Years: Team
- 2017 - present: Rajshahi Division cricket team
- 2017/18: Shinepukur Cricket Club
- 2019: Sylhet Sixers
- 2022, 2025: Fortune Barishal
- 2023: Sylhet Strikers
- 2023, 2026-present: Dhanmondi Sports Club cricket team
- 2023: Jaffna Kings
- 2024: Comilla Victorians
- 2024: Abahani Limited cricket team
- 2024: Dambulla Sixers
- 2025: Mohammedan Sporting Club cricket team
- 2026: Rangpur Riders

Career statistics
Competition	Test	ODI	T20I	FC
Matches	3	58	67	20
Runs scored	378	1,711	1,462	1,711
Batting average	75.60	37.19	28.66	63.37
100s/50s	1/1	1/14	0/7	5/5
Top score	242*	100	83*	350*
Catches/stumpings	1/–	18/–	24/–	14/–
Medal record
Men's Cricket
Representing Bangladesh
ICC U-19 World Cup
Winner	2020 South Africa
- Source: Cricinfo, 11 November 2026

Mohammad Towhid Hridoy (Bengali: তাওহীদ হৃদয়; born 4 December 2000) is a Bangladeshi cricketer. He made his first-class debut for Rajshahi Division in the 2017–18 National Cricket League on 13 October 2017.

In December 2017, he was named in Bangladesh's squad for the 2018 Under-19 Cricket World Cup. He made his List A debut for Shinepukur Cricket Club in the 2017–18 Dhaka Premier Division Cricket League on 5 February 2018.

In October 2018, he was named in the Sylhet Sixers squad, following the draft for the 2018–19 Bangladesh Premier League. He made his Twenty20 debut for Sylhet Sixers in the 2018–19 Bangladesh Premier League on 6 January 2019. In December 2019, he was named as the vice-captain of Bangladesh's squad for the 2020 Under-19 Cricket World Cup. In February 2021, he was selected in the Bangladesh Emerging squad for their home series against the Ireland Wolves.

In December 2021, during the 2021–22 Bangladesh Cricket League, Hridoy scored his maiden double century in first-class cricket, scoring 217 runs.

In March 2023, Hridoy scored run 92 off 85 ball is the highest individual innings on ODI debut by a Bangladeshi batsman.

On 2 September 2026, Hridoy broke the record for the highest first class score by a Bangladeshi batter, scoring 350* for the Bangladesh A cricket team against the South Africa A team in an unofficial test.

== International career ==
=== 2023-2024 ===
In February 2023, he was named in Bangladesh's One Day International (ODI) squad for their series against England. In March 2023, he was named in Twenty20 International (T20I) squad for the same series. He made his T20I, debut in the first T20I of the series, on 9 March 2023. He made his ODI debut against Ireland, on 18 March 2023. Hridoy went on to score 92 runs, which was the highest individual score by a Bangladeshi player on his ODI debut.

Furthermore, in the series against Afghanistan later on, Hridoy played a match-winning knock of 47 not out in the first T20 in a tense game where Bangladesh won on the penultimate ball.

=== 2024-2025 ===
In May 2024, he was named in Bangladesh's squad for the 2024 ICC Men's T20 World Cup tournament.

=== 2025-2026 ===
In January 2025, he was named in Bangladesh's squad for the 2025 ICC Champions Trophy. In February 2025, Hridoy completed his maiden ODI century by scoring 100(118) in Bangladesh's opening match of the Champions Trophy against India. He subsequently became the first Bangladeshi player to score a century against India in an ICC tournament. Towhid Hridoy made his maiden test debut on 28 June 2026 against Zimbabwe.

=== 2026-2027 ===
On 7 November 2026, during the 2nd Test of The West Indies Tour of Bangladesh as part of the ICC World Test Championship 2025-2027 Hridoy reached his maiden test half-century, his maiden test century, his maiden test double century, and broke the record for the highest ever individual score for a Bangladeshi in tests, registering a unbeaten 242* off 359 balls against West Indies, rescuing Bangladesh's innings to 386 from 51-3 and 184-7.

== Franchise Cricket ==
Hridoy was a player for Fortune Barishal in the 2022 BPL. In the next season, he played for Sylhet Strikers scoring consistently and amassing 403 runs in total with 5 half-centuries to his name.

In 2023, Hridoy was brought in Jaffna Kings in Lanka Premier League where in his maiden match he scored 54 off just 39 balls.

In February 2024, Hridoy achieved his maiden T20 century against Durdanto Dhaka while playing for the Comilla Victorians in the BPL. He scored 108*(57) to help his team chase a target of 176.

In 2024, Hridoy continued his franchise career by playing for Comilla Victorians in the BPL, where he scored 312 runs with a strike rate of 127.

He has also expressed interest in participating in future international franchise tournaments like the Caribbean Premier League (CPL) and the Global T20 Canada.
