= Overseas =

Overseas may refer to:

- Diaspora, a scattered population whose origin lies in a separate locale
- Expatriate, a person residing in a country other than their native country
- Outremer or Crusader states, four Roman Catholic polities
- Overseas collectivity, an administrative division of France
- Overseas constituency, an electoral district outside of a nation-state's borders
- Overseas countries and territories, territories dependent on an EU member state
- Overseas country of France, a designation for French Polynesia
- Overseas department and region, a department of overseas France
- Overseas France, the French-administered territories outside Europe
- Overseas province, a non-continental holding of Portugal
- Overseas territory, a separated dependent or constituent part of a country
- Overseas regiments of Venice, oversea infantry (oltremarini/oltramarini) naval infantry units of the Venetian republic recruited in Dalmatia

== As title in popular culture ==
- Overseas (album), a 1957 album by pianist Tommy Flanagan and his trio
- Overseas (band), an American indie rock band
- "Overseas", a 2018 song by American rappers Desiigner and Lil Pump
- "Overseas" (Tee Grizzley song), a 2019 song from Scriptures by American rapper Tee Grizzley
- "Overseas", a 2021 song from Home Alone 2 by British rap collective D-Block Europe featuring Central Cee
- Overseas RUFC, a Maltese rugby club
- "Overseas", a 2016 song by rappers Smoke Dawg and Skepta
- "Overseas" (Ken Carson song), a 2024 song by Ken Carson
