= Ashmead Nedd =

West Indian cricketer

Personal information
- Full name: Ashmead Romano Nedd
- Born: 10 January 2001 (age 25); Guyana
- Batting: Right-handed
- Bowling: Slow left-arm orthodox
- Role: Bowler

Domestic team information
- Years: Team
- 2020–2021: Guyana Amazon Warriors (squad no. 41)
- 2020/21: Leeward Islands
- 2023–: St Kitts and Nevis Patriots
- 2024/25: Guyana

Career statistics
Competition	FC	LA	T20
Matches	12	31	15
Runs scored	155	77	9
Batting average	11.07	8.55	3.00
100s/50s	0/0	0/0	0/0
Top score	30	19	5
Balls bowled	2,807	1,437	305
Wickets	41	39	13
Bowling average	27.56	23.23	26.53
5 wickets in innings	2	0	0
10 wickets in match	0	0	0
Best bowling	6/78	4/29	4/25
Catches/stumpings	7/–	6/–	3/–
- Source: Cricinfo, 11 May 2025

Ashmead Romano Nedd (born 10 January 2001) is a Guyanese cricketer. He is a slow left-arm orthodox bowler.

== Career ==
He made his List A debut on 9 November 2019, for the West Indies Emerging Team in the 2019–20 Regional Super50 tournament. Prior to his List A debut, he was named in the West Indies' squad for the 2018 Under-19 Cricket World Cup. In November 2019, he was named in the West Indies' squad for the 2020 Under-19 Cricket World Cup. He was the leading wicket-taker for the West Indies in the tournament, with eleven dismissals in six matches.

In June 2020, Nedd was selected by the Leeward Islands, in the players' draft hosted by Cricket West Indies ahead of the 2020–21 domestic season. In July 2020, he was named in the Guyana Amazon Warriors squad for the 2020 Caribbean Premier League (CPL). He made his Twenty20 debut on 22 August 2020, for the Guyana Amazon Warriors in the 2020 CPL.

In April 2023, Nedd was named in West Indies Academy's squad for the 2023 Headley Weekes Tri-Series. He made his first-class debut for West Indies Academy on 19 April 2023, against Team Headley.
