= Kevin Wickham (cricketer) =

West Indian cricketer

Personal information
- Full name: Kevin Omar Wickham
- Born: 19 March 2003 (age 23); Barbados
- Batting: Right-handed
- Bowling: Right-arm off-break
- Role: Top order batter

Domestic team information
- Years: Team
- 2022–present: West Indies Academy
- 2023–present: Barbados
- 2023–2024: Barbados Royals
- 2025: Antigua and Barbuda Falcons
- 2026–present: St Kitts and Nevis Patriots

Career statistics
Competition	FC	LA	T20
Matches	21	29	7
Runs scored	1079	714	84
Batting average	34.80	31.04	14.00
100s/50s	3/4	1/2	0/0
Top score	139	118	26
Balls bowled	343	604	0
Wickets	5	15	0
Bowling average	44.00	34.20	–
5 wickets in innings	0	0	0
10 wickets in match	0	0	0
Best bowling	2/26	3/42	–
Catches/stumpings	12/–	14/–	1/–
- Source: ESPNcricinfo, 31 December 2025

Kevin Omar Wickham (born 19 March 2003) is a Barbadian cricketer, who is a right-handed top order batsman. He plays for Barbados national cricket team, having previously represented the West Indies under-19 cricket team.

== Early career ==
In January 2022, Wickham was named in the West Indies' squad as a replacement player for the 2022 Under-19 Men's Cricket World Cup. He received training at the West Indies Academy prior to his regional cricket debut. In July 2022, he was also selected for the CWI Emerging Players' Academy.

== Domestic career ==
He made his List A debut for West Indies Academy on 29 October 2022, against Leeward Islands in the 2022–23 Super50 Cup. In January 2023, he was selected to play for Barbados Pride in the 2022–23 West Indies Championship. He made his first-class debut for Barbados on 8 February 2023, against Jamaica. In April 2023, he was named in West Indies Academy's squad for the inaugural 2023 Headley Weekes Tri-Series. On 28 April 2023, he scored his maiden century in first-class cricket, against Team Weekes. In August 2023, he was picked by Barbados Royals following the players' draft to play for them in the 2023 Caribbean Premier League. He made his Twenty20 debut on 17 August 2023, against Saint Lucia Kings.

== International career ==
In November 2023, Wickham was named in West Indies Academy's squad for their first-class and List A series against Emerging Ireland. During the third innings of the second first-class match, he remained unbeaten scoring 105 runs, leading CWI Academy to a massive win over Emerging Ireland by 432 runs.
