= Jeremiah Louis =

Kittitian cricketer (born 1996)

Personal information
- Full name: Jeremiah Stevenson Louis
- Born: 12 March 1996 (age 30); Saint Kitts
- Nickname: Stingers
- Batting: Right-handed
- Bowling: Right-arm fast
- Relatives: Mikyle Louis (brother)

Domestic team information
- Years: Team
- 2014–present: Leeward Islands
- 2017-present: St Kitts & Nevis Patriots (squad no. 18)

Career statistics
Competition	FC	LA	T20
Matches	57	29	6
Runs scored	1,581	248	11
Batting average	23.25	17.71	–
100s/50s	0/4	0/0	0/0
Top score	78*	41*	11*
Balls bowled	7,529	851	72
Wickets	151	25	3
Bowling average	25.43	33.00	38.66
5 wickets in innings	2	1	0
10 wickets in match	0	0	0
Best bowling	6/69	5/33	2/42
Catches/stumpings	34/–	9/–	1/–
- Source: ESPNcricinfo, 20 April 2024

Jeremiah Stevenson Louis (born 12 March 1996) is a Kittitian cricketer who has played for the Leeward Islands in West Indian domestic cricket.

Louis made his senior debut for the Leewards during the 2014–15 Regional Four Day Competition, against Trinidad and Tobago. A right-arm medium-fast bowler, his List A debut came later in the season, against Jamaica. Louis's best bowling performance to date came in a four-day game against the Windward Islands, when he took 3/29.

In the player draft for the 2017 CPL, Louis was selected by the St Kitts & Nevis Patriots.

In November 2017, he took his maiden five-wicket haul in first-class cricket, bowling for the Leeward Islands against Barbados in the 2017–18 Regional Four Day Competition.

In June 2018, he was named in the Cricket West Indies B Team squad for the inaugural edition of the Global T20 Canada tournament.

In June 2024, Louis was named in the West Indian test squad for their tour of England, alongside his brother Mikyle, as an injury replacement for Kemar Roach.
